= 2024 Chinese FA Cup =

CFA Cup
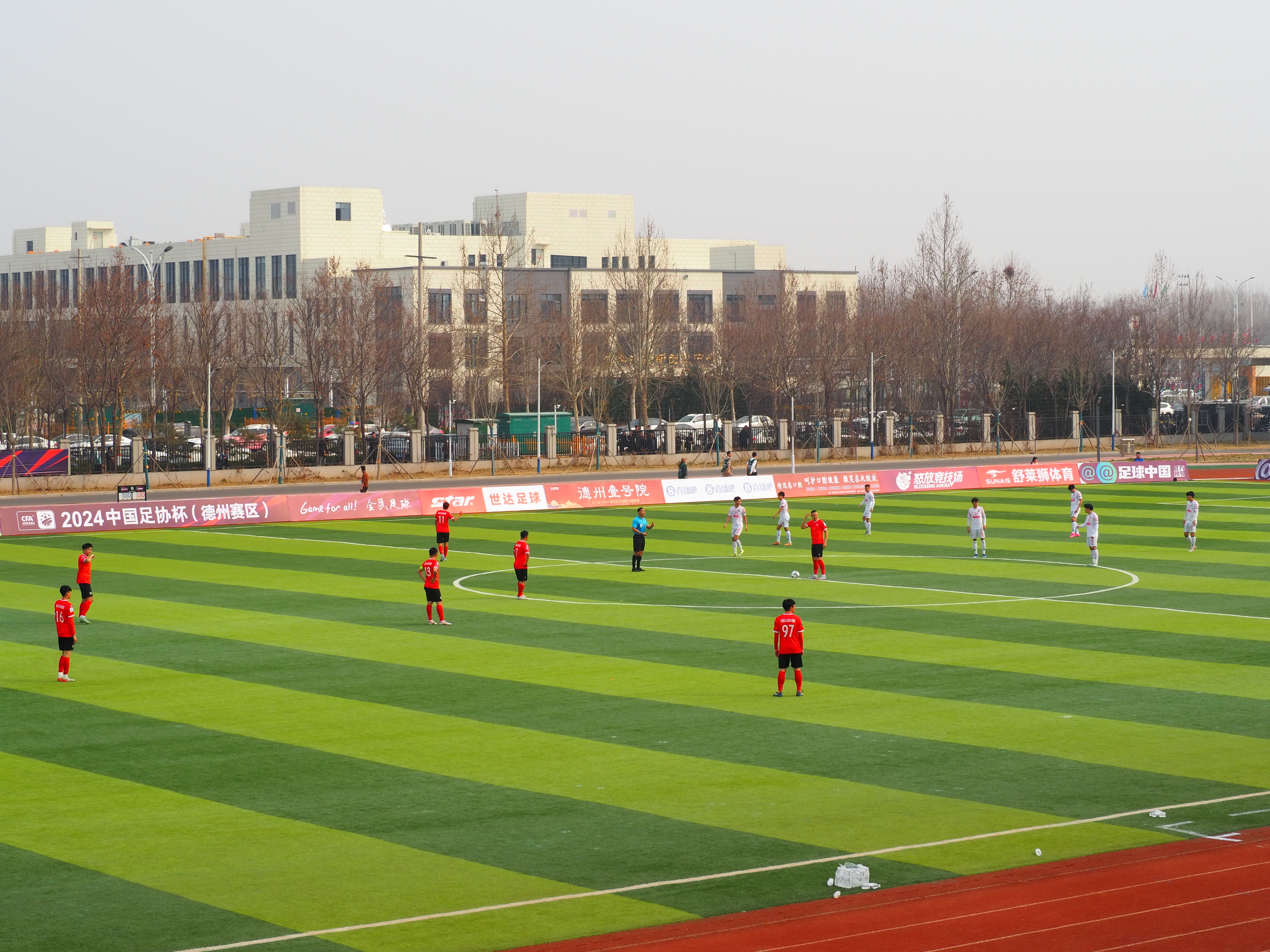
- Dezhou Haishan taking on Guangdong Red Treasure in a first round tie, 16 March 2024

Tournament details
- Country: China
- Dates: 15 January – 23 November 2024
- Teams: 80

Final positions
- Champions: Shanghai Port (1st title)
- Runners-up: Shandong Taishan
- AFC Champions League Elite: Shanghai Port

The 2024 Chinese Football Association Cup (Chinese: 2024中国足球协会杯) was the 26th edition of the Chinese FA Cup. The winner qualified to the 2025–26 AFC Champions League Elite.

The defending champions were Chinese Super League side Shanghai Shenhua. They were unable to defend their title after losing to local rivals Shanghai Port in the semi-finals.

Shanghai Port won their 1st ever Chinese FA Cup after beating Shandong Taishan 3–1 in the final.

== Schedule ==
Round	Draw date	Match dates	Clubs remaining	Clubs involved	Winners from previous round	New entries this round	New entries notes
First round	23 February 2024	15–17 March 2024	80	32	none	32	16 winners from qualifying round 12 2024 Chinese Champions League teams 2 amateur teams 2 2024 China League Two teams
Second round	23 February 2024	19–21 April 2024	64	32	16	16	16 2024 China League Two teams
Third round	23 February 2024	15–19 May 2024	48	32	16	16	16 2024 China League One teams
Fourth round	23 February 2024	19–23 June 2024	32	32	16	16	16 2024 Chinese Super League teams
Fifth round	25 June 2024	16–17 July 2024	16	16	16	none	
Quarter-finals	25 June 2024	20–22 August 2024	8	8	8	none	
Semi-finals	25 June 2024	24–26 September 2024	4	4	4	none	
Final	25 June 2024	23 November 2024	2	2	2	none	

== Qualifying round ==
Between 15 January 2024 and 23 January 2024, 18 teams contested in the qualifying round, with all matches being hosted at the Zhuhai Suoka Sports Training Base.

=== Group A ===
Pos	Team	Pld	W	D	L	GF	GA	GD	Pts	Qualification	SSS	QEB	QXN	QEU	CCX	NNJ
1	Shanghai Shenshui	5	4	0	1	14	2	+12	12	Qualification for First round	—			2–0		
2	Qujing EB	5	3	1	1	14	3	+11	10 (Note: Tied on head-to-head points, goal difference, and goals scored. Goal difference in all matches: Qujing EB +11, Qianxinan Xufengtang +7.)	Qualification for First round	1–0	—		3–1		9–0
3	Qianxinan Xufengtang	5	3	1	1	13	6	+7	10	Qualification for First round	1–3	1–1	—	2–1		4–0
4	Qingdao Elite United	5	1	1	3	6	9	−3	4 (Note: Tied on head-to-head points, goal difference, and goals scored. Goal difference in all matches: Qingdao Elite United −3, Changchun Xidu −5.)	Qualification for First round				—		
5	Changchun Xidu	5	1	1	3	4	9	−5	4	Qualification for First round	0–1	1–0	1–5	1–1	—	1–2
6	Nanning Juding (Note: Tied on points with Group C Shanxi Xiangyu. Goal difference in all matches: Shanxi Xiangyu −18, Nanning Juding −22.)	5	1	0	4	3	25	−22	3	Participation in First round	0–8			1–3		—

Updated to match(es) played on 23 January 2024. Source: CFA Cup
Rules for classification: 1) Points; 2) Head-to-head points; 3) Head-to-head goal difference; 4) Head-to-head goals scored; 5) Goal difference; 6) Goals scored; 7) Disciplinary points (yellow card = 1 point, red card as a result of two yellow cards = 3 points, direct red card = 3 points, yellow card followed by direct red card = 4 points); 8) Drawing of lots.

=== Group B ===
Pos	Team	Pld	W	D	L	GF	GA	GD	Pts	Qualification	SFL	HZQ	DZH	CQC	SZJ	LZH
1	Shanghai MHI KLions	5	5	0	0	16	0	+16	15	Qualification for First round	—	3–0	1–0	3–0	4–0	3–0
2	Hangzhou Qiantang	5	4	0	1	13	3	+10	12	Qualification for First round		—	2–0	2–0	3–0	6–0
3	Dezhou Haishan	5	3	0	2	10	7	+3	9	Qualification for First round			—	4–2	2–0	4–0
4	Chongqing Chunlei	5	2	0	3	7	9	−2	6	Qualification for First round				—		
5	Shenzhen Jixiang	5	1	0	4	2	12	−10	3	Qualification for First round				0–2	—	2–1
6	Lanzhou Hailu	5	0	0	5	1	18	−17	0	Participation in First round				0–3		—

Updated to match(es) played on 23 January 2024. Source: CFA Cup
Rules for classification: 1) Points; 2) Head-to-head points; 3) Head-to-head goal difference; 4) Head-to-head goals scored; 5) Goal difference; 6) Goals scored; 7) Disciplinary points (yellow card = 1 point, red card as a result of two yellow cards = 3 points, direct red card = 3 points, yellow card followed by direct red card = 4 points); 8) Drawing of lots.

=== Group C ===
Pos	Team	Pld	W	D	L	GF	GA	GD	Pts	Qualification	NBS	SHS	XLT	GNU	GXB	SXX
1	Ningbo Shoufa	5	5	0	0	27	2	+25	15	Qualification for First round	—	2–1	4–1	7–0		
2	Shanghai Second	5	4	0	1	17	3	+14	12	Qualification for First round		—				
3	Xiamen Lujian Tiancheng	5	3	0	2	24	7	+17	9	Qualification for First round		1–3	—	6–0		
4	Gannan 92 United Team	5	1	0	4	3	19	−16	3 (Note: Tied on head-to-head points. Head-to-head goal difference: Gannan 92 United Team +1, Guangxi Bushan +0, Shanxi Xiangyu −1.)	Qualification for First round		0–4		—		
5	Guangxi Bushan	5	1	0	4	3	25	−22	3	Qualification for First round	0–7	0–8	0–7	2–1	—	
6	Shanxi Xiangyu (Note: Tied on points with Group A Nanning Juding. Goal difference in all matches: Shanxi Xiangyu −18, Nanning Juding −22.)	5	1	0	4	2	20	−18	3	Qualification for First round	0–7	0–1	0–9	0–2	2–1	—

Updated to match(es) played on 23 January 2024. Source: CFA Cup
Rules for classification: 1) Points; 2) Head-to-head points; 3) Head-to-head goal difference; 4) Head-to-head goals scored; 5) Goal difference; 6) Goals scored; 7) Disciplinary points (yellow card = 1 point, red card as a result of two yellow cards = 3 points, direct red card = 3 points, yellow card followed by direct red card = 4 points); 8) Drawing of lots.

== First round ==
The draw for the first round was made on 23 February 2024 by Yu Hanchao and Wang Shenchao. The exact fixtures were announced on 8 March 2024, with Guangxi Bushan hosting the opening ceremony for the tournament. The ties took place between 15 and 17 March 2024. The round included Dezhou Haishan, Hangzhou Qiantang, Nanning Juding, Ningbo Shoufa, Qingdao Elite United, and Qingdao Kunpeng the lowest-ranked teams remaining in the competition.

Number of teams per tier still in competition
Chinese Super League (Note: Chinese Super League teams will join the competition in the fourth round.)	China League One (Note: China League One teams joined the competition in the third round.)	China League Two (Note: China League Two teams joined the competition in the second round (with the exceptions of Dalian K'un City and Xi'an Chongde Ronghai, who joined in the first round).)	Chinese Champions League	Amateur	Total
16 / 16	16 / 16	18 / 18	24 / 24	6 / 6	80 / 80

15 March 2024	Shanghai Shenshui (4)	3–0	Shanghai Tongji (4)	Shanghai
14:00 UTC+8	Zhang Sheng 7'; Hu Shengdi 24'; Yang Yuhui 69'	Report		Stadium: Shanghai United Football Base Field 2 Attendance: 0 Referee: Zhang Yi

15 March 2024	Shanxi Xiangyu (4)	4–1	Qingdao Kunpeng (A)	Jinzhong
14:00 UTC+8	Sun Qi 48', 89'; Zhang Junye 69'; Song Haocong 80'	Report	87' Wang Long	Stadium: Shanxi Vocational University of Engineering Science and Technology Stadium; Attendance: 358; Referee: Shan Dan'ao

15 March 2024	Hangzhou Qiantang (A)	3–0	Ningxia Fangzhong (4)	Hangzhou
15:00 UTC+8	Shao Renzhe 7'; Zhang Zhuo'ao 83'; Jin Yihang 86'	Report		Stadium: Linping Sports Centre Stadium; Attendance: 102; Referee: Wang Minjie

15 March 2024	Qianxinan Xufengtang (4)	3–0	Wuhan Xiaoma (4)	Xingyi
15:30 UTC+8	Shen Haodi 15'; Song Hanchuan 40' (pen.); Li Jiachen 45+2'	Report		Stadium: Qianxinan Prefecture Yilong Baseball Sports Park Football Stadium; Attendance: 1,355; Referee: Zhang Haoheng

15 March 2024	Guangxi Bushan (4)	2–0	Pingluo Hengli (4)	Guigang
19:30 UTC+8	Liu Xin 60'; Gao Zilong 82'	Report		Stadium: Guigang Sports Centre Stadium; Attendance: 21,398; Referee: Xu Qiangqiang

16 March 2024	Ningbo Shoufa (A)	0–2	Jiangsu Landhouse Dong Victory (4)	Ningbo
14:00 UTC+8			65' Hamit Shepket; 68' (o.g.) Wang Qi	Stadium: Ningbo Sports Center; Attendance: 2,362; Referee: Mu Fupeng

16 March 2024	Shanghai MHI KLions (4)	5–0	Quanzhou Qinggong (4)	Shanghai
14:30 UTC+8	Shen Jiahao 11', 66'; Li Haowen 48'; Xu Ning 85', 87'	Report		Stadium: East China University of Science and Technology Stadium; Attendance: 369; Referee: Jiao Zi

16 March 2024	Xiamen Lujian Tiancheng (4)	2–4	Xi'an Chongde Ronghai (3)	Xiamen
15:00 UTC+8	Yang Deliang 57', 86'	Report	22' Gong Zheng; 40' Luo Heng; 75' Li Jinqing; 90+5' He Zhitao	Stadium: Haicang Sports Centre Stadium; Attendance: 307; Referee: Geng Maoxiang

16 March 2024	Dezhou Haishan (A)	4–2	Guangdong Red Treasure (4)	Dezhou
15:00 UTC+8	Gao Xiang 28', 73'; Liu Hangcheng 38', 68'	Report	13' Li Weijie; 48' Li Lingfeng	Stadium: Dezhou Advanced Normal School Football Field; Attendance: 2,300; Referee: Guo Xiang

16 March 2024	Qujing EB (4)	0–0 (7–6 p)	Xi'an Yilian (4)	Qujing
15:30 UTC+8		Report		Stadium: Qujing Cultural and Sports Park Stadium; Attendance: 8,688; Referee: Liu Xindong
	Penalties
	Yang Junjie (penalty scored); Li Zhenqin (penalty scored); Shen Jixing (penalty missed); Zhang Hongyu (penalty scored); He Yingzhen (penalty scored); Su Yaqi (penalty scored); He Yuchen (penalty scored); Zhang Hongyu (penalty scored)		(penalty scored) Cheng Peng; (penalty scored) He Shuang; (penalty scored) Cui Jing; (penalty missed) Wen Kejie; (penalty scored) Fang Wensheng; (penalty scored) Lei Yutian; (penalty scored) Xiang Ben; (penalty missed) Bai Xuyao

16 March 2024	Shenzhen Jixiang (4)	3–0	Inner Mongolia Caoshangfei (4)	Shenzhen
15:30 UTC+8	Liu Zhilu 47'; Deng Jiaxing 56'; Ling Sihao 75'	Report		Stadium: Bao'an Stadium Outer Field; Attendance: 278; Referee: Wang Haidong

16 March 2024	Gannan 92 United Team (4)	1–2	Changle Jingangtui (4)	Linxia
15:30 UTC+8	Tsering Samdub 90+7'	Report	18' Ren Zhihao; 38' (pen.) Zheng Jinwen	Stadium: Linxia Olympic Sports Centre Stadium; Attendance: 1,810; Referee: Liu Chentao

16 March 2024	Changchun Xidu (4)	0–0 (5–4 p)	Lanzhou Hailu (4)	Guigang
19:00 UTC+8		Report		Stadium: Jiuling Lake Football Training Centre Field 1 Attendance: 10; Referee: Lin Zhaohao
	Penalties
	Wang Tong (penalty scored); Alper Jurat (penalty scored); Bebet Murat (penalty scored); Wang Zihao (penalty scored); Hou Zhe (penalty scored)		(penalty scored) Zhang Yibo; (penalty scored) Guo Yunxiao; (penalty scored) He Haizheng; (penalty scored) Luo Chengbin; (penalty missed) Chen Xiaolin
Note: Due to unfavourable weather conditions in Changchun, Jilin, and surrounding areas, the match was originally scheduled to be played at a neutral ground in Dongxing, Guangxi. However, on 15 March, the match was moved to take place in Guigang, Guangxi.

17 March 2024	Shanghai Second (4)	7–0	Nanning Juding (A)	Shanghai
14:00 UTC+8	Zhang Yi 12' (pen.), 24'; Fan Qunxiao 19'; Xu Yongle 33'; Huang Haijian 49' (o.g.); Zhu Jun 59'; Xiao Yangyang 61'	Report		Stadium: Jinshan Sports Centre Outer Field; Attendance: 367; Referee: Cui Tingbin

17 March 2024	Qingdao Elite United (A)	2–0	Shanxi Longchengren (4)	Qingdao
14:30 UTC+8	Li Zheng 35'; Zhou Yang 57'	Report		Stadium: Qingdao Jimo Chuangzhi New Area Sports Center Stadium; Attendance: 5,226; Referee: Li Wei

17 March 2024	Chongqing Chunlei (4)	2–5	Dalian K'un City (3)	Chongqing
15:30 UTC+8	Yang Lei 42'; Tan Liwei 61' (pen.)	Report	10' Geng Xiaoshun; 16' Han Xu; 29' Ge Yuxiang; 56' Liu Jiaxin; 85' Li Xudong	Stadium: Longxing Football Stadium Outer Field; Attendance: 468; Referee: Wu Kai

== Second round ==
The draw for the second round was made on 23 February 2024 by Yu Hanchao and Wang Shenchao. The exact fixtures were announced on 2 April 2024. The ties will take place between 19 and 21 April 2024. The round included Dezhou Haishan, Hangzhou Qiantang, and Qingdao Elite United, the lowest-ranked teams remaining in the competition.

Number of teams per tier still in competition
Chinese Super League	China League One	China League Two	Chinese Champions League	Amateur	Total
16 / 16	16 / 16	18 / 18	11 / 24	3 / 6	64 / 80

19 April 2024	Hangzhou Qiantang (A)	1–0	Nantong Haimen Codion (3)	Hangzhou
14:00 UTC+8	Shao Renzhe 17'	Report		Stadium: Linping Sports Centre Stadium; Attendance: 110; Referee: Zhang Shuo

20 April 2024	Jiangsu Landhouse Dong Victory (4)	1–1 (3–4 p)	Langfang Glory City (3)	Nanjing
14:00 UTC+8	Yang Lei 50'	Report	35' Wu Yufan	Stadium: Nanjing Olympic Sports Centre; Attendance: 876; Referee: Xue Xiangsheng
	Penalties
	Tang Miao (penalty scored); Ma Jun (penalty scored); Zhang Zijian (penalty missed); Li Shizhou (penalty scored); Li Hanlin (penalty missed)		(penalty scored) Luan Haodong; (penalty scored) Wu Yufan; (penalty scored) Wei Chaolun; (penalty scored) Sun Zhonghao

20 April 2024	Shanghai MHI KLions (4)	2–0	Jiangxi Dark Horse Junior (3)	Shanghai
14:00 UTC+8	Xu Qi 3'; Li Haowen 79'	Report		Stadium: East China University of Science and Technology Stadium; Attendance: 305; Referee: Yin Zhikai

20 April 2024	Shanghai Second (4)	1–1 (2–3 p)	Ganzhou Ruishi (3)	Shanghai
14:00 UTC+8	Tian Hubo 4'	Report	90+4' Huo Liang	Stadium: Jinshan Sports Centre Outer Field; Attendance: 106; Referee: Zhang Xianda
	Penalties
	Chen Shenji (penalty missed); Zhou Jun (penalty missed); Li Haifeng (penalty missed); Dai Lin (penalty scored); Yan Jiahao (penalty scored)		(penalty scored) Chen Guokang; (penalty missed) Chen Rong; (penalty missed) Chen Zewen; (penalty scored) Gan Xianhao; (penalty scored) Zhang Chenlong

20 April 2024	Shanxi Xiangyu (4)	1–4	Beijing IT (3)	Changzhi
14:30 UTC+8	Li Chuanjie 90'	Report	4' Chen Boyi; 41' (pen.) Xiong Zhiwei; 64', 67' Cui Hao	Stadium: Changzhi Tunliu Sports Center; Attendance: 666; Referee: Liu Xin

20 April 2024	Dalian K'un City (3)	3–2	Quanzhou Yassin (3)	Dalian
15:00 UTC+8	Feruk Ablimit 14'; Cong Zhen 73'; Mirzat Ali 81'	Report	41' Li Yalun; 90+5' Ying Weijie	Stadium: Dalian Football Youth Training Center; Attendance: 423; Referee: Ren Dexin

20 April 2024	Qianxinan Xufengtang (4)	1–4	Shenzhen Juniors (3)	Xingyi
15:00 UTC+8	Wang Hao 58'	Report	30' Lu Jingsen; 45+1' Chen Weiqi; 45+3' Zheng Zhiming; 90+4' Chen Junhan	Stadium: Qianxinan Prefecture Yilong Baseball Sports Park Football Stadium; Attendance: 4,353; Referee: Liu Xiao

20 April 2024	Dezhou Haishan (A)	1–3	Tai'an Tiankuang (3)	Dezhou
15:00 UTC+8	Li Jiaxing 16'	Report	33' Zhou Zi'ang; 68' He Linli; 90' Shi Ming	Stadium: Dezhou Advanced Normal School Football Field; Attendance: 3,317; Referee: Wang Minjie

20 April 2024	Changchun Xidu (4)	0–5	Shaanxi Union (3)	Changchun
15:00 UTC+8		Report	3', 76' Wen Shuo; 45+3', 83', 90+2' Ma Xiaolei	Stadium: Changchun Yatai Jingyue Training Ground Main Field; Attendance: 556; Referee: Wang Yang

20 April 2024	Xi'an Chongde Ronghai (3)	0–4	Guangdong GZ-Power (3)	Xi'an
15:30 UTC+8		Report	4' Wu Xingyu; 24' (pen.) Liu Chaoyang; 87' Tang Tianyi; 88' Lin Huahuan	Stadium: Xi'an Olympic Sports Center; Attendance: 158; Referee: Li Wei
Note: The match, originally scheduled to take place at the Xi'an Physical Education University Huyi Campus Football Field, was moved to the Xi'an Olympic Sports Center due to issues with the stadium.

20 April 2024	Shenzhen Jixiang (4)	3–1	Guangxi Lanhang (3)	Shenzhen
15:30 UTC+8	Deng Jiaxing 57'; Abliz Memet 67'; Chen Junnan 87'	Report	13' An Yongjian	Stadium: Shenzhen Youth Football Training Center Field 1 Attendance: 426; Referee: Cai Xiaochun

20 April 2024	Guangxi Bushan (4)	0–1	Rizhao Yuqi (3)	Guigang
19:30 UTC+8		Report	86' Bai Tianci	Stadium: Guigang Sports Centre Stadium; Attendance: 20,778; Referee: Chen Sijian

21 April 2024	Qingdao Elite United (A)	0–0 (4–3 p)	Hubei Istar (3)	Qingdao
14:30 UTC+8		Report		Stadium: Qingdao Jimo Chuangzhi New Area Sports Center Stadium; Attendance: 3,833; Referee: Xie Chenyao
	Penalties
	Xu Hailiang (penalty scored); Yang Jin (penalty missed); Chen Weilu (penalty scored); Liu Qing (penalty scored); Qi Yabin (penalty scored)		(penalty scored) Wang Zheng; (penalty scored) Wei Suowei; (penalty scored) Wei Zixian; (penalty missed) Xia Zihao; (penalty missed) Sun Kangbo

21 April 2024	Changle Jingangtui (4)	0–4	Hunan Billows (3)	Fuzhou
14:30 UTC+8		Report	45+4' Liu Peilin; 61' Qeyser Tursun; 71' Yu Haozhen; 89' Kamiran Halimurat	Stadium: Tianjin University-National University of Singapore Joint Institute in Fuzhou Football Field; Attendance: 65; Referee: Wang Feiqiang

21 April 2024	Shanghai Shenshui (4)	1–1 (2–4 p)	Haikou Mingcheng (3)	Shanghai
15:00 UTC+8	Wu Yueyang 78'	Report	10' Tan Jiaye	Stadium: Shanghai United Football Base Field 3 Attendance: 287; Referee: Liang Ming
	Penalties
	Tang Jiaqi (penalty scored); Jin Chenchen (penalty missed); Xi Sunbin (penalty missed); Zhou Tianyu (penalty scored)		(penalty scored) Zhang Zili; (penalty scored) Tang Wenxuan; (penalty scored) He Xinjie; (penalty missed) Jiang Weilang; (penalty scored) Tan Jiaye

21 April 2024	Qujing EB (4)	1–5	Guangxi Hengchen (3)	Qujing
15:30 UTC+8	Li Chi 64'	Report	54' Guo Zicheng; 69' Liu Yelong; 71' Enqer Erkin; 74', 87' Huang Chuang	Stadium: Qujing Cultural and Sports Park Stadium; Attendance: 21,860; Referee: Zheng Shenfei

== Third round ==
The draw for the third round was made on 23 February 2024 by Zhao Lina and Ningbo Shoufa head coach Rong Bocheng. The ties took place between 15 and 19 May 2024. The round included Hangzhou Qiantang and Qingdao Elite United, the lowest-ranked teams remaining in the competition.

Number of teams per tier still in competition
Chinese Super League	China League One	China League Two	Chinese Champions League	Amateur	Total
16 / 16	16 / 16	12 / 18	2 / 24	2 / 6	48 / 80

15 May 2024	Shanghai MHI KLions (4)	1–1 (5–4 p)	Yanbian Longding (2)	Shanghai
14:00 UTC+8	Wang Jun 66'	Report	29' Li Long	Stadium: East China University of Science and Technology Stadium; Attendance: 337; Referee: Li Pengda
	Penalties
	Xu Qi (penalty scored); Wang Jun (penalty missed); Wu Haitian (penalty scored); Li Haowen (penalty scored); Xu Ning (penalty missed); Mu Jiaxin (penalty scored); Wang Dong (penalty scored)		(penalty missed) Jin Taiyan; (penalty missed) Wang Bohao; (penalty scored) Li Qiang; (penalty scored) Li Shibin; (penalty scored) Xuan Zhijian; (penalty scored) Liu Bo; (penalty missed) Khedrup

17 May 2024	Shenzhen Juniors (3)	1–2	Qingdao Red Lions (2)	Shenzhen
15:30 UTC+8	Mai Sijing 90+2'	Report	51' Chen Jiaqi; 78' (o.g.) Li Bin	Stadium: Longhua Cultural and Sports Center; Attendance: 164; Referee: Dan Ning

17 May 2024	Tai'an Tiankuang (3)	0–3	Foshan Nanshi (2)	Tai'an
15:30 UTC+8		Report	17' Huang Chuqi; 58', 76' Li Jiaheng	Stadium: Taishan Stadium; Attendance: 765; Referee: Su Zihao

17 May 2024	Haikou Mingcheng (3)	1–4	Jiangxi Lushan (2)	Haikou
17:00 UTC+8	Xu Jiashi 29'		11', 76' Zhu Mingxin; 45+3', 86' Qaharman	Stadium: Haikou Mission Hills Football Training Base Stadium; Attendance: 106; Referee: Xiong Xing

17 May 2024	Dalian K'un City (3)	0–2	Yunnan Yukun (2)	Dalian
19:00 UTC+8		Report	69', 90' Liu Yuhao	Stadium: Jinzhou Stadium; Attendance: 1,211; Referee: Han Lei

17 May 2024	Rizhao Yuqi (3)	2–0	Shanghai Jiading Huilong (2)	Rizhao
19:30 UTC+8	Ying Yuxiao 31'; Pan Yuchen 87'	Report		Stadium: Rizhao International Football Center; Attendance: 1,879; Referee: Li Peng

18 May 2024	Langfang Glory City (3)	1–1 (4–2 p)	Heilongjiang Ice City (2)	Langfang
15:30 UTC+8	Chen Yanpu 86'	Report	47' Liang Peiwen	Stadium: Langfang Stadium; Attendance: 1,421; Referee: Meng Xiangkun
	Penalties
	Luan Haodong (penalty scored); Wei Chaolun (penalty scored); An Shuo (penalty scored); Chen Yanpu (penalty scored)		(penalty missed) Zhao Chengle; (penalty scored) Zhang Yujie; (penalty scored) Zhang Zimin; (penalty missed) Zhou Pinxi

18 May 2024	Shenzhen Jixiang (4)	0–1	Nanjing City (2)	Shenzhen
15:30 UTC+8		Report	15' Jiang Shichao	Stadium: Shenzhen Football Association Guangming Training Base Field 1 Attendance: 498; Referee: Liu Xindong

18 May 2024	Guangdong GZ-Power (3)	0–1	Wuxi Wugo (2)	Guangzhou
17:00 UTC+8		Report	60' Song Xintao	Stadium: Huangpu Sports Center; Attendance: 509; Referee: Wang Xiao

18 May 2024	Shaanxi Union (3)	1–1 (7–6 p)	Guangzhou (2)	Weinan
17:00 UTC+8	Li Rui 71'	Report	23' Eysajan	Stadium: Weinan Sports Center Stadium; Attendance: 23,519; Referee: Yan Xu
	Penalties
	Pang Zhiquan (penalty missed); Ma Xiaolei (penalty scored); Li Rui (penalty scored); Yang Ruiqi (penalty scored); Wang Weipu (penalty scored); Xie Zhiwei (penalty scored); Xu Wu (penalty scored); Zhao Shuhao (penalty scored)		(penalty scored) Hou Yu; (penalty missed) Wang Wenxuan; (penalty scored) Abduwahap; (penalty scored) Yang Dejiang; (penalty scored) Wang Shilong; (penalty scored) Islam; (penalty scored) Liao Jintao; (penalty missed) Xu Bin

18 May 2024	Hunan Billows (3)	0–3	Shijiazhuang Gongfu (2)	Loudi
17:30 UTC+8		Report	57' Wang Song; 66' Gui Hong; 74' Bu Xin	Stadium: Loudi Sports Center; Attendance: 12,526; Referee: Li Wei

19 May 2024	Qingdao Elite United (A)	1–2	Suzhou Dongwu (2)	Qingdao
14:30 UTC+8	Chen Weilu 20'	Report	18' Liang Weipeng; 69' Deng Yubiao	Stadium: Qingdao Jimo Chuangzhi New Area Sports Center Stadium; Attendance: 2,086; Referee: Gu Zhongchao

19 May 2024	Beijing IT (3)	0–1	Guangxi Pingguo Haliao (2)	Beijing
15:30 UTC+8		Report	11' Zhang Huajun	Stadium: BIT Eastern Athletic Field; Attendance: 289; Referee: Mu Yuchen

19 May 2024	Ganzhou Ruishi (3)	2–2 (3–1 p)	Liaoning Tieren (2)	Dingnan
15:30 UTC+8	Yang Pengju 56'; Zhou Ziheng 90+2'	Report	25', 40' Zhang Jiaming	Stadium: Dingnan Youth Football Training Center; Attendance: 327; Referee: Jiang Ning
	Penalties
	Chen Rong (penalty scored); Chen Guokang (penalty missed); Zhou Ziheng (penalty scored); Gan Xianhao (penalty scored)		(penalty scored) Gui Zihan; (penalty missed) Zhang Jiaming; (penalty scored) Wang Tianci; (penalty scored) Wang Qihong

19 May 2024	Guangxi Hengchen (3)	2–1	Dalian Yingbo (2)	Nanning
17:00 UTC+8	Zhang Xiao 47'; Guo Zicheng 57'	Report	15' Yan Peng	Stadium: Nanning Sports School Wuhe Campus Football Field; Attendance: 966; Referee: Wu Can

19 May 2024	Hangzhou Qiantang (A)	1–2	Chongqing Tonglianglong (2)	Hangzhou
19:30 UTC+8	Shao Renzhe 26'	Report	71' Sun Xipeng; 90+8' Wang Weicheng	Stadium: Linping Sports Centre Stadium; Attendance: 1,158; Referee: Geng Maoxiang

== Fourth round ==
The draw for the fourth round was made on 23 February 2024 by Zhao Lina and Ningbo Shoufa head coach Rong Bocheng. The ties will take place between 19 and 23 June 2024. The round included Shanghai MHI KLions, the lowest-ranked team remaining in the competition.

Number of teams per tier still in competition
Chinese Super League	China League One	China League Two	Chinese Champions League	Amateur	Total
16 / 16	10 / 16	5 / 18	1 / 24	0 / 6	32 / 80

19 June 2024	Langfang Glory City (3)	0–0 (3–5 p)	Qingdao Hainiu (1)	Langfang
16:00 UTC+8				Stadium: Langfang Stadium; Referee: He Xin

19 June 2024	Ganzhou Ruishi (3)	1–3	Nantong Zhiyun (1)	Dingnan
16:00 UTC+8				Stadium: Dingnan Youth Football Training Center; Referee: Geng Maoxiang

21 June 2024	Shanghai MHI KLions (4)	1–1 (3–4 p)	Chengdu Rongcheng (1)	Shanghai
16:00 UTC+8				Stadium: Shanghai Stadium

21 June 2024	Guangxi Hengchen (3)	0–2	Shanghai Port (1)	Nanning
17:00 UTC+8				Stadium: Nanning Sports School Wuhe Campus Football Field

21 June 2024	Shaanxi Union (3)	2–2 (2–3 p)	Changchun Yatai (1)	Weinan
17:00 UTC+8				Stadium: Weinan Sports Center Stadium

21 June 2024	Wuxi Wugo (2)	1–0	Meizhou Hakka (1)	Jiangyin
19:30 UTC+8				Stadium: Jiangyin Stadium

21 June 2024	Rizhao Yuqi (3)	0–1	Henan (1)	Rizhao
19:30 UTC+8				Stadium: Rizhao International Football Center

21 June 2024	Yunnan Yukun (2)	1–1 (3–5 p)	Tianjin Jinmen Tiger (1)	Yuxi
19:30 UTC+8				Stadium: Yuxi Plateau Sports Center Stadium

21 June 2024	Foshan Nanshi (2)	0–1	Shanghai Shenhua (1)	Foshan
19:30 UTC+8				Stadium: Nanhai Sports Center

21 June 2024	Guangxi Pingguo Haliao (2)	4–3	Wuhan Three Towns (1)	Pingguo
20:00 UTC+8				Stadium: Pingguo Stadium

22 June 2024	Jiangxi Lushan (2)	0–3	Zhejiang (1)	Ruichang
18:30 UTC+8				Stadium: Ruichang Sports Park Stadium

22 June 2024	Chongqing Tonglianglong (2)	3–6	Shandong Taishan (1)	Chongqing
19:30 UTC+8				Stadium: Tongliang Long Stadium

22 June 2024	Qingdao Red Lions (2)	0–2	Shenzhen Peng City (1)	Qingdao
19:30 UTC+8				Stadium: Guzhenkou University City Sports Center

22 June 2024	Suzhou Dongwu (2)	0–4	Beijing Guoan (1)	Suzhou
19:30 UTC+8				Stadium: Suzhou Olympic Sports Centre

22 June 2024	Shijiazhuang Gongfu (2)	2–2 (3–4 p)	Qingdao West Coast (1)	Shijiazhuang
19:30 UTC+8				Stadium: Yutong International Sports Center

23 June 2024	Nanjing City (2)	1–0	Cangzhou Mighty Lions (1)	Nanjing
19:30 UTC+8				Stadium: Wutaishan Stadium

== Fifth round ==
The draw for the fifth round was made on 25 June 2024 by Sun Jihai and Xu Yunlong. The round included Guangxi Pingguo Haliao, Nanjing City and Wuxi Wugo, the lowest-ranked teams remaining in the competition.

Number of teams per tier still in competition
Chinese Super League	China League One	China League Two	Chinese Champions League	Amateur	Total
13 / 16	3 / 16	0 / 18	0 / 24	0 / 6	16 / 80

16 July 2024	Chengdu Rongcheng (1)	2–0	Nantong Zhiyun (1)	Chengdu
19:35 UTC+8	Yan Dinghao 45+1'; Felipe 81'	Report		Stadium: Phoenix Hill Football Stadium; Referee: Ma Yunkun

17 July 2024	Qingdao West Coast (1)	0–4	Shandong Taishan (1)	Qingdao
18:00 UTC+8		Report	Chen Pu 32', 78'; Liu Pujin 50' (o.g.); Cryzan 86'	Stadium: Qingdao West Coast University City Sports Center; Referee: Zhang Lei

17 July 2024	Henan (1)	1–0	Guangxi Pingguo Haliao (2)	Zhengzhou
19:00 UTC+8	Huang Zichang 52'	Report		Stadium: Hanghai Stadium; Referee: Sun Shengyu

17 July 2024	Wuxi Wugo (2)	1–3	Beijing Guoan (1)	Jiangyin
19:30 UTC+8	Zhu Haiwei 71'	Report	Yang Liyu 11'; Abreu 86'; Zhang Yuning 90'	Stadium: Jiangyin Stadium; Referee: Shan Dan'ao

17 July 2024	Tianjin Jinmen Tiger (1)	4–3 (a.e.t.)	Changchun Yatai (1)	Tianjin
19:30 UTC+8	Xie Weijun 59'; Compagno 86', 113' (pen.); Guo Hao 93'	Report	Liu Yun 65' (pen.); Dilyimit Tudi 67'; Berić 100'	Stadium: TEDA Soccer Stadium; Referee: Dai Yige

17 July 2024	Zhejiang (1)	1–2	Shanghai Port (1)	Hangzhou
19:35 UTC+8	Lucas 76'	Report	Li Shenglong 59'; Vargas 65'	Stadium: Xiaoshan Sports Center; Referee: Liu Wei

17 July 2024	Shenzhen Peng City (1)	0–0 (a.e.t.) (3–5 p)	Shanghai Shenhua (1)	Shenzhen
20:00 UTC+8		Report		Stadium: Bao'an Stadium; Referee: Mu Yuchen

17 July 2024	Qingdao Hainiu (1)	0–2	Nanjing City (2)	Qingdao
20:00 UTC+8		Report	Ogbu 32', 45'	Stadium: Qingdao Youth Football Stadium; Referee: Liu Zhao

== Quarter-finals ==
The draw for the quarter-finals was made on 25 June 2024 by Sun Jihai and Xu Liang. The round included Nanjing City, the lowest-ranked team remaining in the competition.

Number of teams per tier still in competition
Chinese Super League	China League One	China League Two	Chinese Champions League	Amateur	Total
7 / 16	1 / 16	0 / 18	0 / 24	0 / 6	8 / 80

21 August 2024	Shandong Taishan (1)	3–1	Henan (1)	Jinan
19:35 UTC+8				Stadium: Jinan Olympic Sports Center Stadium

21 August 2024	Nanjing City (2)	1–2	Chengdu Rongcheng (1)	Nanjing
19:35 UTC+8				Stadium: Wutaishan Stadium

22 August 2024	Shanghai Shenhua (1)	2–1	Beijing Guoan (1)	Shanghai
19:35 UTC+8				Stadium: Shanghai Stadium

22 August 2024	Shanghai Port (1)	3–0	Tianjin Jinmen Tiger (1)	Shanghai
19:35 UTC+8				Stadium: Pudong Football Stadium

== Semi-finals ==
The draw for the semi-finals was made on 25 June 2024 by Sun Jihai and Xu Liang.

Number of teams per tier still in competition
Chinese Super League	China League One	China League Two	Chinese Champions League	Amateur	Total
4 / 16	0 / 16	0 / 18	0 / 24	0 / 6	4 / 80

24 September 2024	Shandong Taishan (1)	1–0	Chengdu Rongcheng (1)	Jinan
19:35 UTC+8				Stadium: Jinan Olympic Sports Center Stadium; Referee: Li Haixin

25 September 2024	Shanghai Port (1)	3–2	Shanghai Shenhua (1)	Shanghai
19:35 UTC+8				Stadium: Pudong Football Stadium

== Final ==
A draw for the final was made on 25 June 2024 by Sun Jihai and Xu Liang, to determine the "home" team for administrative purposes.

23 November 2024
18:30 UTC+8

Shandong Taishan (1)	1–3	Shanghai Port (1)

Wenzhou Olympic Sports Center Stadium, Wenzhou
Referee: Ma Ning

== Top scorers ==
Rank	Player	Team	Goals
1	(China) Wu Lei	Shanghai Port	3
