= 2021 Chinese FA Cup =

CFA Cup

Tournament details
- Country: China
- Dates: 1 July 2021 – 9 January 2022
- Teams: 59

Final positions
- Champions: Shandong Taishan (7th title)
- Runners-up: Shanghai Port
- AFC Champions League: Shandong Taishan

Tournament statistics
- Matches played: 64
- Goals scored: 193 (3.02 per match)

The 2021 Chinese Football Association Cup, officially known as the Yanjing Beer 2021 Chinese FA Cup (Chinese: 燕京啤酒2021中国足球协会杯) for sponsorship reasons, was the 23rd edition of the Chinese FA Cup.

The defending champions were Chinese Super League side Shandong Taishan. They retained the trophy, beating Shanghai Port 1–0 in the final.

== Schedule ==
Round	Draw date	Match dates	Clubs remaining	Clubs involved	Winners from previous round	New entries this round	New Entries Notes
First round	20 July 2021	31 July–1 August 2021	59	24	none	24	24 teams from 2021 China League Two
Second round	20 July 2021	3–4 August 2021	47	12	12	none	
Third round	20 July 2021	18–20 August 2021	41	18	none	18	18 teams from 2021 China League One
Fourth round	29 September 2021	13–14 October 2021	32	32	6+9	17	16 teams from 2021 Chinese Super League; 1 team from 2021 Chinese Champions League
Fifth round	29 September 2021	18–19 October 2021	16	16	16	none	
Quarter-finals	29 September 2021	First Leg: 23–24 October 2021; Second Leg: 28–29 October 2021	8	8	8	none	
Semi-finals	29 September 2021	First Leg: 2–3 November 2021; Second Leg: 6–7 November 2021	4	4	4	none	
Final	29 September 2021	9 January 2022	2	2	2	none	

== First round ==
The draw for the first round was held on 20 July 2021. The winners of the first round advanced to the second round.

31 July 2021	Hebei Kungfu (3)	1–1 (6–5 p)	Shaoxing Keqiao Yuejia (3)	Duyun International Football Town Field 1, Duyun
15:30 UTC+8		Report		Attendance: 0 (Note: The match was played behind closed doors due to the COVID-19 pandemic.)

31 July 2021	Xi'an Wolves (3)	4–1	Shanxi Longjin (3)	Duyun International Football Town Field 12, Duyun
15:30 UTC+8		Report		Attendance: 0

31 July 2021	Qingdao Hainiu (3)	1–3	Shaanxi Warriors Beyond (3)	Yancheng Yufeng Football Training Base Field 1, Yancheng
15:30 UTC+8		Report		Attendance: 0

31 July 2021	Kunming Zheng He Shipman (3)	5–2	Dongguan United (3)	Yancheng Yufeng Football Training Base Field 3, Yancheng
15:30 UTC+8		Report		Attendance: 0

31 July 2021	Hunan Billows (3)	0–4	Sichuan Minzu (3)	Luxi Plateau Football Training Base Field 3, Luxi
15:30 UTC+8		Report		Attendance: 0

31 July 2021	Yanbian Longding (3)	1–3	Shanghai Jiading Huilong (3)	Luxi Plateau Football Training Base Field 7, Luxi
15:30 UTC+8		Report		Attendance: 0

1 August 2021	Inner Mongolia Caoshangfei (3)	1–1 (2–3 p)	Guangxi Pingguo Haliao (3)	Duyun International Football Town Field 1, Duyun
15:30 UTC+8		Report		Attendance: 0

1 August 2021	Hubei Istar (3)	2–4	Dandong Tengyue (3)	Duyun International Football Town Field 12, Duyun
15:30 UTC+8		Report		Attendance: 0

1 August 2021	China U-20 (3)	6–0	Hebei Zhuoao (3)	Yancheng Yufeng Football Training Base Field 1, Yancheng
15:30 UTC+8		Report		Attendance: 0

1 August 2021	Yichun Grand Tiger (3)	1–4	Wuxi Wugou (3)	Yancheng Yufeng Football Training Base Field 3, Yancheng
15:30 UTC+8		Report		Attendance: 0

1 August 2021	Qingdao Youth Island (3)	1–0	Quanzhou Yassin (3)	Luxi Plateau Football Training Base Field 3, Luxi
15:30 UTC+8		Report		Attendance: 0

1 August 2021	Xiamen Egret Island (3)	3–0	Qingdao Red Lions (3)	Luxi Plateau Football Training Base Field 7, Luxi
15:30 UTC+8		Report		Attendance: 0

== Second round ==
The draw for the second round was held on 20 July 2021. The winners of the second round advanced to the third round.

3 August 2021	Hebei Kungfu (3)	2–5	Xi'an Wolves (3)	Duyun International Football Town Field 1, Duyun
15:30 UTC+8		Report		Attendance: 0

3 August 2021	Shaanxi Warriors Beyond (3)	4–1	Kunming Zheng He Shipman (3)	Dafeng Olympic Sports Centre, Yancheng
15:30 UTC+8		Report		Attendance: 0

3 August 2021	Sichuan Minzu (3)	2–0	Shanghai Jiading Huilong (3)	Luxi Plateau Football Training Base Field 3, Luxi
15:30 UTC+8		Report		Attendance: 0

4 August 2021	Guangxi Pingguo Haliao (3)	1–1 (2–4 p)	Dandong Tengyue (3)	Qiannan Nationwide Fitness Centre Stadium, Duyun
15:30 UTC+8		Report		Attendance: 0

4 August 2021	China U-20 (3)	2–0	Wuxi Wugou (3)	Dafeng Olympic Sports Centre, Yancheng
15:30 UTC+8		Report		Attendance: 0

4 August 2021	Qingdao Youth Island (3)	3–0	Xiamen Egret Island (3)	Luxi Plateau Football Training Base Field 3, Luxi
15:30 UTC+8		Report		Attendance: 0

== Third round ==
The draw for the third round was held on 20 July 2021. The winners of the third round advanced to the fourth round.

18 August 2021	Zhejiang (2)	0–0 (3–1 p)	Beijing BIT (2)	Hengbei Football Town Field 9, Meizhou
17:00 UTC+8		Report		Attendance: 0 Referee: Ma Teng

19 August 2021	Nantong Zhiyun (2)	3–0; Awarded	Heilongjiang Ice City (2)	Hengbei Football Town Field 9, Meizhou
17:00 UTC+8		Report	Zhao Chengle 13'; Liu Xinyu 15'; Bai Zijian 20', 62'; Pan Chaoran 38' (pen.); Fan Bojian 51'	Attendance: 0 Referee: Zhu Wenbin

19 August 2021	Meizhou Hakka (2)	0–1	Beijing BSU (2)	Wuhua County Olympic Sports Centre, Meizhou
19:35 UTC+8		Report	Wang Weibo 66'	Attendance: 0 Referee: Liu Chentao

19 August 2021	Suzhou Dongwu (2)	0–1	Chengdu Rongcheng (2)	Dalian Youth Football Training Base Main Stadium, Dalian
19:35 UTC+8		Report	Naldinho 74' (pen.)	Attendance: 0 Referee: Wu Liying

19 August 2021	Jiangxi Beidamen (2)	0–2	Wuhan Three Towns (2)	Tazi Lake Football Base Field 1, Wuhan
20:00 UTC+8		Report	Marcão 5'; Zhou Heng 80' (pen.)	Attendance: 0 Referee: Li Pengda

20 August 2021	Xinjiang Tianshan Leopard (2)	1–4	Zibo Cuju (2)	Dalian Youth Football Training Base Main Stadium, Dalian
15:00 UTC+8	Abdulla Abduwal 57'	Report	Wang Chengkuai 3', 42' (pen.); Lü Pin 78'; Liu Ziming 82'	Attendance: 0 Referee: Ren Tong

20 August 2021	Shaanxi Chang'an Athletic (2)	1–0	Guizhou (2)	Tazi Lake Football Base Field 3, Wuhan
17:30 UTC+8	Ma Junliang 85'	Report		Attendance: 0 Referee: Gao Peng

20 August 2021	Kunshan (2)	4–1	Liaoning Shenyang Urban (2)	Dalian Youth Football Training Base Main Stadium, Dalian
19:35 UTC+8	Liu Yuhao 18'; Gu Wenxiang 34'; Xiao Taotao 57' (pen.); Wang Xijie 66'	Report	Gui Zihan 55'	Attendance: 0 Referee: Gan Shuran

20 August 2021	Sichuan Jiuniu (2)	2–1	Nanjing City (2)	Tazi Lake Football Base Field 1, Wuhan
20:00 UTC+8	Wang Qi 66'; Xia Dalong 85'	Report	Huang Peng 56'	Attendance: 0 Referee: He Xin

== Fourth round ==
32 teams qualified to this round. The draw for the fourth round was held on 29 September 2021.

13 October 2021	Shenzhen (1)	7–0	Shaanxi Warriors Beyond (3)	Changchun Yatai Jingyue Football Training Base Main Stadium, Changchun
14:30 UTC+8	Wang Yongpo 5', 22' (pen.); Zhou Xin 9'; Sun Ke 28', 63'; Gao Lin 45+2'; Xu Haofeng 51'	Report		Attendance: 0 Referee: Cui Yong

13 October 2021	Guangzhou (1)	0–1	Qingdao Youth Island (3)	Shandong Provincial Stadium, Jinan
15:30 UTC+8		Report	Song Bo 37' (pen.)	Attendance: 0 Referee: Han Lei

13 October 2021	Tianjin Jinmen Tiger (1)	3–0	Beijing BSU (2)	Dalian Sports Centre Stadium Outer Field 3, Dalian
15:30 UTC+8	Su Yuanjie 8', 11'; Cruz 82' (pen.)	Report		Attendance: 0 Referee: Liu Wei

13 October 2021	Chongqing Liangjiang Athletic (1)	2–0	Wuhan Three Towns (2)	Hengbei Football Town Field 9, Meizhou
16:00 UTC+8	Yin Congyao 78' (pen.); Wen Tianpeng 84'	Report		Attendance: 0 Referee: Ma Yunkun

13 October 2021	Changchun Yatai (1)	4–0	Zhejiang (2)	Changchun Stadium, Changchun
18:00 UTC+8	Tan Long 21', 72'; Erik 49'; Dilyimit Tudi 77'	Report		Attendance: 0 Referee: Liu Zhao

13 October 2021	Shandong Taishan (1)	1–0	Nantong Zhiyun (2)	Jinan Olympic Sports Center Stadium, Jinan
19:30 UTC+8	Fellaini 67'	Report		Attendance: 0 Referee: Ding Chao

13 October 2021	Meixian Qiuxiang (4)	1–5	Henan Songshan Longmen (1)	Wuhua County Olympic Sports Centre, Meizhou
19:30 UTC+8	Cao Jinlong 9'	Report	Han Dong 12', 67'; Dilmurat Mawlanyaz 65'; Ma Xingyu 78'; Feng Boxuan 82'	Attendance: 0 Referee: Liu Xinyu

13 October 2021	Dalian Pro (1)	2–1	China U-20 (3)	Dalian Youth Football Training Base Main Stadium, Dalian
19:30 UTC+8	Lin Liangming 15'; Wang Jinxian 88'	Report	Jia Feifan 13'	Attendance: 0 Referee: Ma Li

14 October 2021	Cangzhou Mighty Lions (1)	5–1	Zibo Cuju (2)	Changchun Yatai Jingyue Football Training Base Main Stadium, Changchun
14:30 UTC+8	Maritu 1', 55', 63', 73'; Bughrahan Skandar 57'	Report	Nan Yunqi 56'	Attendance: 0 Referee: Shi Zhenlu

14 October 2021	Wuhan (1)	7–0	Dandong Tengyue (3)	Shandong Provincial Stadium, Jinan
15:30 UTC+8	Dong Xuesheng 10', 81'; Huang Zichang 18', 25'; Zhao Honglüe 62'; Liu Yun 73'; Liu Junxian 85'	Report		Attendance: 0 Referee: Wang Minjie

14 October 2021	Hebei (1)	0–1	Shaanxi Chang'an Athletic (2)	Dalian Sports Centre Stadium Outer Field 3, Dalian
15:30 UTC+8		Report	Onuegbu 12'	Attendance: 0 Referee: Cui Yueqiang

14 October 2021	Guangzhou City (1)	1–1 (4–5 p)	Chengdu Rongcheng (2)	Hengbei Football Town Field 9, Meizhou
16:00 UTC+8	Leonço 50'	Report	Min Junlin 40'	Attendance: 0 Referee: Dai Yige
	Penalties
	Huang Zhengyu (penalty missed); Cardona (penalty scored); Han Pengfei (penalty scored); Li Tixiang (penalty scored); Fan Yunlong (penalty scored); Tan Chun Lok (penalty missed)		(penalty scored) Xiang Baixu; (penalty scored) Min Junlin; (penalty scored) Gan Chao; (penalty scored) Hu Mingtian; (penalty missed) Wang Hanlin; (penalty scored) Zhang Yan

14 October 2021	Shanghai Shenhua (1)	3–0	Sichuan Minzu (3)	Changchun Stadium, Changchun
18:00 UTC+8	Yang Xu 14'; Yu Hanchao 88' (pen.); Sun Shilin 89'	Report		Attendance: 0 Referee: Niu Minghui

14 October 2021	Qingdao (1)	3–2	Kunshan (2)	Jinan Olympic Sports Center Stadium, Jinan
19:30 UTC+8	Zhu Jianrong 29', 44', 81' (pen.)	Report	Zhang Chenglin 45+5'; Hildeberto 72'	Attendance: 0 Referee: Hei Xiaohu

14 October 2021	Beijing Guoan (1)	1–1 (2–3 p)	Sichuan Jiuniu (2)	Wuhua County Olympic Sports Centre, Meizhou
19:30 UTC+8	Wang Ziming 28'	Report	Zhang Jiaqi 45+2'	Attendance: 0 Referee: Qiu Zhaojun
	Penalties
	Wang Ziming (penalty missed); Gao Tianyi (penalty scored); Jin Taiyan (penalty scored); Liu Huan (penalty missed); Yang Fan (penalty missed)		(penalty scored) Wang Qi; (penalty scored) Zheng Shengxiong; (penalty missed) Xiao Kun; (penalty scored) Wei Jingzong

14 October 2021	Shanghai Port (1)	1–0	Xi'an Wolves (3)	Dalian Youth Football Training Base Main Stadium, Dalian
19:30 UTC+8	Li Shenyuan 90+5'	Report		Attendance: 0 Referee: Chen Jindong

== Fifth round ==
The draw for the fifth round was held on 29 September 2021.

18 October 2021	Changchun Yatai (1)	0–2	Shanghai Shenhua (1)	Changchun Stadium, Changchun
15:00 UTC+8		Report	Moreno 19'; Doumbouya 90+3'	Attendance: 4,200; Referee: Liu Wei

18 October 2021	Dalian Pro (1)	2–0	Tianjin Jinmen Tiger (1)	Dalian Youth Football Training Base Main Stadium, Dalian
15:30 UTC+8	Tao Qianglong 54'; Wu Wei 67'	Report		Attendance: 0 Referee: Ma Li

18 October 2021	Shandong Taishan (1)	3–0	Qingdao Youth Island (3)	Jinan Olympic Sports Center Stadium, Jinan
19:30 UTC+8	Zheng Zheng 15'; Cheng Yuan 83'; Tian Xin 84'	Report		Attendance: 0 Referee: Hei Xiaohu

18 October 2021	Henan Songshan Longmen (1)	2–0	Chongqing Liangjiang Athletic (1)	Wuhua County Stadium, Meizhou
19:30 UTC+8	Karanga 13'; Zhong Jinbao 69'	Report		Attendance: 0 Referee: Dai Yige

19 October 2021	Cangzhou Mighty Lions (1)	1–3	Shenzhen (1)	Changchun Yatai Jingyue Football Training Base Main Stadium, Changchun
15:00 UTC+8	Senghor 34'	Report	Wang Yongpo 19'; Kardec 26'; Sun Ke 90'	Attendance: 0 Referee: Shi Zhenlu

19 October 2021	Wuhan (1)	4–0	Qingdao (1)	Jinan Olympic Sports Center Stadium, Jinan
15:30 UTC+8	Fang Hao 46'; Zhao Honglüe 55'; Liu Yun 58'; Liu Junxian 72'	Report		Attendance: 0 Referee: Tang Shunqi

19 October 2021	Shaanxi Chang'an Athletic (2)	1–2	Shanghai Port (1)	Dalian Youth Football Training Base Main Stadium, Dalian
15:30 UTC+8	Tambe 55'	Report	Paulinho 16'; Lü Wenjun 78' (pen.)	Attendance: 0 Referee: Liu Zhao

19 October 2021	Chengdu Rongcheng (2)	1–2	Sichuan Jiuniu (2)	Wuhua County Olympic Sports Centre, Meizhou
19:30 UTC+8	Gan Chao 62' (pen.)	Report	Xia Dalong 22'; Wang Qi 46'	Attendance: 0 Referee: Ma Yunkun

== Quarter-finals ==
The draw for the quarter-finals was held on 29 September 2021.

=== First leg ===
23 October 2021	Shandong Taishan (1)	2–0	Wuhan (1)	Jinzhou Stadium, Dalian
15:30 UTC+8	Tian Xin 61'; Song Long 74'	Report		Attendance: 0 Referee: Yu Bo

23 October 2021	Henan Songshan Longmen (1)	1–1	Sichuan Jiuniu (2)	Dalian Youth Football Training Base Main Stadium, Dalian
19:30 UTC+8	Ivo 30'	Report	Nan Xiaoheng 33'	Attendance: 0 Referee: Jia Zhiliang

24 October 2021	Shanghai Shenhua (1)	1–0	Shenzhen (1)	Jinzhou Stadium, Dalian
15:30 UTC+8	Yu Hanchao 41'	Report		Attendance: 0 Referee: Guan Xing

24 October 2021	Dalian Pro (1)	0–3	Shanghai Port (1)	Dalian Youth Football Training Base Main Stadium, Dalian
19:30 UTC+8		Report	Lü Wenjun 26' (pen.); Li Shenyuan 55'; Liu Zhurun 81'	Attendance: 0 Referee: Dai Yige

=== Second leg ===
28 October 2021	Wuhan (1)	0–1 (0–3 agg.)	Shandong Taishan (1)	Jinzhou Stadium, Dalian
15:30 UTC+8		Report	Delgado 64'	Attendance: 0 Referee: Liu Wei

28 October 2021	Sichuan Jiuniu (2)	0–0 (1–1 agg.) (5–6 p)	Henan Songshan Longmen (1)	Dalian Sports Centre Stadium, Dalian
19:30 UTC+8		Report		Attendance: 0 Referee: Guan Xing
	Penalties
	Wei Jingzong (penalty scored); Nan Song (penalty scored); Xiao Kun (penalty scored); Liu Jing (penalty scored); Ruan Jun (penalty missed); Xia Dalong (penalty scored); Vidić (penalty missed)		(penalty scored) Dourado; (penalty scored) Turay; (penalty scored) Ma Xingyu; (penalty missed) Chen Pu; (penalty scored) Feng Boxuan; (penalty scored) Chen Hao; (penalty scored) Yang Guoyuan

29 October 2021	Shenzhen (1)	0–0 (0–1 agg.)	Shanghai Shenhua (1)	Jinzhou Stadium, Dalian
15:30 UTC+8		Report		Attendance: 0 Referee: Zhang Lei

29 October 2021	Shanghai Port (1)	0–0 (3–0 agg.)	Dalian Pro (1)	Dalian Sports Centre Stadium, Dalian
19:30 UTC+8		Report		Attendance: 0 Referee: Jia Zhiliang

== Semi-finals ==
The draw for the semi-finals was held on 29 September 2021.

=== First leg ===
2 November 2021	Shandong Taishan (1)	1–0	Henan Songshan Longmen (1)	Dalian Youth Football Training Base Main Stadium, Dalian
15:30 UTC+8	Delgado 75'	Report		Attendance: 0 Referee: Liu Wei

3 November 2021	Shanghai Shenhua (1)	1–5	Shanghai Port (1)	Dalian Sports Centre Stadium, Dalian
15:30 UTC+8	Moreno 35'	Report	Lü Wenjun 8'; Yang Shiyuan 15'; He Guan 24'; Paulinho 59'; Liu Zhurun 85'	Attendance: 0 Referee: Guan Xing

=== Second leg ===
6 November 2021	Henan Songshan Longmen (1)	2–4 (2–5 agg.)	Shandong Taishan (1)	Dalian Sports Centre Stadium, Dalian
15:30 UTC+8	Ma Xingyu 38'; Dourado 90'	Report	Liu Yang 30', 79'; Delgado 62', 63'	Attendance: 0 Referee: Shi Zhenlu

7 November 2021	Shanghai Port (1)	1–1 (6-2 agg.)	Shanghai Shenhua (1)	Dalian Sports Centre Stadium, Dalian
15:30 UTC+8	Liu Zhurun 55'	Report	Zhao Mingjian 90+1'	Attendance: 0 Referee: Zhang Lei

== Final ==
The final was played on 9 January 2022 in Chengdu.

9 January 2022
19:30 UTC+8

Shandong Taishan (1)	1–0	Shanghai Port (1)
Jadson 82'	Report

Fenghuangshan Football Stadium, Chengdu
Attendance: 0
Referee: Wang Zhe

GK	14	(China) Wang Dalei
CB	4	(Brazil) Jadson
CB	27	(China) Shi Ke
CB	5	(China) Zheng Zheng
RWB	8	(China) Xu Xin		(substituted off) 63'
LWB	28	(South Korea) Son Jun-ho	(yellow card) 38'
RM	37	(China) Ji Xiang
CM	25	(Belgium) Marouane Fellaini (c)
CM	10	(Brazil) Moisés
LM	11	(China) Liu Yang		(substituted off) 63'
CF	7	(China) Guo Tianyu		(substituted off) 88'
Substitutes:
GK	1	(China) Li Guanxi
GK	18	(China) Han Rongze
DF	6	(China) Wang Tong
DF	15	(China) Qi Tianyu		(substituted on) 63'
DF	20	(China) Chen Zhechao
DF	31	(China) Zhao Jianfei
DF	35	(China) Dai Lin
DF	39	(China) Song Long
MF	19	(China) Pedro Delgado
MF	33	(China) Jin Jingdao		(substituted on) 63'
MF	36	(China) Duan Liuyu		(substituted on) 88'
FW	21	(China) Liu Binbin
Manager:
(China) Hao Wei

GK	1	(China) Yan Junling
CB	25	(China) Mirahmetjan Muzepper	(substituted off) 69'
CB	28	(China) He Guan	(substituted off) 90'
CB	4	(China) Wang Shenchao
RM	15	(China) Li Shenyuan
CM	16	(China) Zhang Huachen	(substituted off) 69'
CM	19	(Australia) Aaron Mooy
LM	21	(China) Yu Hai	(substituted off) 26'
RF	8	(Brazil) Oscar (c)
CF	39	(China) Hu Jinghang
LF	11	(China) Lü Wenjun
Substitutes:
GK	12	(China) Chen Wei
GK	22	(China) Du Jia
DF	2	(China) Li Ang	(substituted on) 26'
DF	23	(China) Fu Huan
DF	27	(China) Zhang Wei
MF	6	(China) Cai Huikang
MF	18	(China) Zhang Yi
MF	20	(China) Yang Shiyuan	(substituted on) 69'
MF	26	(China) Chen Chunxin
MF	36	(China) Ablahan Haliq
FW	14	(China) Li Shenglong	(substituted on) 90'
FW	33	(China) Liu Zhurun	(substituted on) 69'
Manager:
(Croatia) Ivan Leko

Assistant referees:
Wang Dexin
Shi Xiang
Fourth official:
Zhang Lei
Video assistant referee:
Shi Zhenlu
Assistant video assistant referees:
Tang Shunqi
