= 2022 Chinese FA Cup =

CFA Cup

Tournament details
- Country: China
- Dates: 20 August 2022 – 15 January 2023
- Teams: 41

Final positions
- Champions: Shandong Taishan (8th title)
- Runners-up: Zhejiang
- AFC Champions League: Shandong Taishan

Tournament statistics
- Matches played: 44
- Goals scored: 155 (3.52 per match)
- Top goal scorer(s): (Nigeria) Chisom Egbuchulam (5 goals)

Awards
- Best player: (Brazil) Moisés (Shandong Taishan)

The 2022 Chinese Football Association Cup, officially known as the Yanjing Beer 2022 Chinese FA Cup (Chinese: 燕京啤酒2022中国足球协会杯) for sponsorship reasons, was the 24th edition of the Chinese FA Cup.

The defending champions are Chinese Super League side Shandong Taishan. They retained the trophy, beating Zhejiang 2–1 in the final.

== Schedule ==
Round	Draw date	Match dates	Clubs remaining	Clubs involved	Winners from previous round	New entries this round	New Entries Notes
First round	15 August 2022	20–22 August 2022	41	18	none	18	18 teams from 2022 China League One
Second round	5 September 2022	16–18 November 2022	32	32	9	23	18 teams from 2022 Chinese Super League; Top 3 teams from 2022 China League Two; Top 2 existing non-promoted teams from 2021 Chinese Champions League
Third round	5 September 2022	17–19 December 2022	16	16	16	none	
Quarter-finals	5 September 2022	First Leg: 4–5 January 2023; Second Leg: 7–8 January 2023	8	8	8	none	
Semi-finals	5 September 2022	11 January 2023	4	4	4	none	
Final	5 September 2022	15 January 2023	2	2	2	none	

== First round ==
The draw for the first round was held on 15 August 2022.

20 August 2022	Suzhou Dongwu (2)	2–0	Beijing BIT (2)	Dalian Sports Centre Stadium Field No.3, Dalian
15:30 UTC+8	Qeyser Adiljan 16', 54'	Report		Referee: Ren Tong

20 August 2022	Zibo Cuju (2)	3–1	Shanghai Jiading Huilong (2)	Dalian Youth Football Training Base Main Stadium, Dalian
19:30 UTC+8	Zhang Yuanshu 1' (pen.); Wang Hansheng 49'; Yan Yiming 90+3'	Report	Alex 57'	Referee: Dan Ning

21 August 2022	Heilongjiang Ice City (2)	2–2 (7–8 p)	Qingdao Hainiu (2)	Dalian Sports Centre Stadium Field No.3, Dalian
15:30 UTC+8	Etti 29', 41'	Report	Cao Sheng 12'; Chen Jiaqi 66'	Referee: Wang Zhe

21 August 2022	Nantong Zhiyun (2)	0–2	Shijiazhuang Gongfu (2)	Tangshan Nanhu City Football Training Base Field No.1, Tangshan
15:30 UTC+8		Report	Liu Tianyang 24'; Leonardo 67'	Referee: Wan Tao

21 August 2022	Kunshan (2)	4–2	Liaoning Shenyang Urban (2)	Tangshan Nanhu City Football Training Base Field No.3, Tangshan
15:30 UTC+8	Gong Qiule 33'; Abduwahap Aniwar 36', 55' (pen.); Wu Yufan 62'	Report	Yu Shang 17'; Min Yinhan 42'	Referee: Liu Chentao

21 August 2022	Shaanxi Chang'an Athletic (2)	0–1	Guangxi Pingguo Haliao (2)	Jiangning Football Training Base Field No.2, Nanjing
16:00 UTC+8		Report	Li Boxi 41'	Referee: Qin Xiaohan

21 August 2022	Sichuan Jiuniu (2)	4–2	Beijing BSU (2)	Jiangning Football Training Base Stadium, Nanjing
16:00 UTC+8	Xia Dalong 30', 45+1'; Ma Canjie 60'; Zhou Dadi 73'	Report	Wang Jinze 7' (pen.); Wang Haochen 49'	Referee: Cui Yong

22 August 2022	Jiangxi Beidamen (2)	4–3	Xinjiang Tianshan Leopard (2)	Tangshan Nanhu City Football Training Base Field No.1, Tangshan
15:30 UTC+8		Report		Referee: Mu Fupeng

22 August 2022	Nanjing City (2)	0–0 (4–2 p)	Qingdao Youth Island (2)	Jiangning Football Training Base Stadium, Nanjing
16:00 UTC+8		Report		Referee: Wang Xiao

== Second round ==
The draw for the second round was held on 5 September 2022.

16 November 2022	Jiangxi Beidamen (2)	0–5	Shanghai Shenhua (1)	Dalian Sports Centre Stadium Field No.3, Dalian
14:00 UTC+8		Report

16 November 2022	Shijiazhuang Gongfu (2)	2–6	Meizhou Hakka (1)	Jiangning Football Training Base Field No.2, Nanjing
14:00 UTC+8		Report

16 November 2022	Jinan Xingzhou (3)	1–0	Changchun Yatai (1)	Jiangning Football Training Base Stadium, Nanjing
14:00 UTC+8		Report

16 November 2022	Sichuan Jiuniu (2)	2–4	Guangzhou (1)	Dalian Youth Football Training Base Main Stadium, Dalian
14:30 UTC+8		Report

16 November 2022	Xi'an Ronghai (4)	0–1	Guangzhou City (1)	Hengbei Football Town Field No.9, Meizhou
15:00 UTC+8		Report

16 November 2022	Chengdu Rongcheng (1)	3–0	Hebei (1)	Shuangliu Sports Centre, Chengdu
15:30 UTC+8		Report

17 November 2022	Qingdao Hainiu (2)	0–2	Shandong Taishan (1)	Tangshan Nanhu City Football Training Base Field No.1, Tangshan
14:00 UTC+8		Report

17 November 2022	Dandong Tengyue (3)	1–5	Wuhan Three Towns (1)	Jiangning Football Training Base Stadium, Nanjing
14:00 UTC+8		Report

17 November 2022	Kunshan (2)	0–4	Tianjin Jinmen Tiger (1)	Dalian Youth Football Training Base Main Stadium, Dalian
14:00 UTC+8		Report

17 November 2022	Yanbian Longding (3)	1–5	Cangzhou Mighty Lions (1)	Jiangning Football Training Base Field No.2, Nanjing
14:00 UTC+8		Report

17 November 2022	Guangxi Pingguo Haliao (2)	1–4	Henan Songshan Longmen (1)	Tangshan Nanhu City Football Training Base Field No.3, Tangshan
14:00 UTC+8		Report

17 November 2022	Zibo Cuju (2)	1–0	Shenzhen (1)	Dalian Sports Centre Stadium Field No.3, Dalian
14:30 UTC+8		Report

17 November 2022	Beijing Guoan (1)	2–2 (3–5 p)	Jingchuan Wenhui (4)	Rizhao International Football Center, Rizhao
15:30 UTC+8	Liu Guobo 35'; Cao Yongjing 54' (pen.)	Report	Du Zexin 4'; Liu Jianxin 70'
	Penalties
	Wang Ziming (penalty scored); Chen Yanpu (penalty scored); Gao Tianyi (penalty scored); Jin Taiyan (penalty missed)		(penalty scored) Cui Tonghui; (penalty scored) Ilaldin Abdugheni; (penalty scored) Li Jiajun; (penalty scored) Liu Jianxin; (penalty scored) Ma Dongnan

18 November 2022	Nanjing City (2)	0–5	Shanghai Port (1)	Jiangning Football Training Base Stadium, Nanjing
14:00 UTC+8		Report

18 November 2022	Suzhou Dongwu (2)	2–2 (7–6 p)	Wuhan Yangtze River (1)	Dalian Youth Football Training Base Main Stadium, Dalian
14:00 UTC+8		Report

18 November 2022	Dalian Pro (1)	0–1	Zhejiang (1)	Dalian Sports Centre Stadium, Dalian
15:30 UTC+8		Report

== Third round ==
17 December 2022	Shandong Taishan (1)	3–0; Awarded	Zibo Cuju (2)	Jinjiang Sports Center Stadium, Jinjiang
14:30 UTC+8		Report

18 December 2022	Jingchuan Wenhui (4)	2–3	Jinan Xingzhou (3)	Jiangning Football Training Base Stadium, Nanjing
14:00 UTC+8		Report		Referee: Zhang Long

18 December 2022	Wuhan Three Towns (1)	3–0; Awarded	Tianjin Jinmen Tiger (1)	Wuhan Sports Center, Wuhan
15:30 UTC+8		Report

18 December 2022	Cangzhou Mighty Lions (1)	3–1	Guangzhou (1)	Haikou Mission Hills Football Training Base Stadium, Haikou
16:00 UTC+8		Report		Referee: Liu Zhao

19 December 2022	Zhejiang (1)	3–0	Guangzhou City (1)	Huzhou Olympic Sports Centre, Huzhou
15:00 UTC+8		Report		Referee: Zhang Lei

19 December 2022	Shanghai Port (1)	3–0; Awarded	Suzhou Dongwu (2)	Jinjiang Football Training Center Stadium, Jinjiang
15:30 UTC+8		Report

19 December 2022	Chengdu Rongcheng (1)	3–0	Meizhou Hakka (1)	Shuangliu Sports Centre, Chengdu
15:30 UTC+8		Report		Referee: Niu Minghui

19 December 2022	Henan Songshan Longmen (1)	0–3; Awarded	Shanghai Shenhua (1)	Haikou Mission Hills Football Training Base Stadium, Haikou
18:00 UTC+8		Report

== Quarter-finals ==
=== First leg ===
4 January 2023	Shandong Taishan (1)	3–1	Wuhan Three Towns (1)	Suzhou Sports Center, Suzhou
14:00 UTC+8	Song Long 42'; Liu Yang 56'; Liu Binbin 86'	Report	Tao Qianglong 4'	Referee: Wang Zhe

4 January 2023	Shanghai Shenhua (1)	5–1	Cangzhou Mighty Lions (1)	Suzhou Olympic Sports Centre, Suzhou
16:30 UTC+8	Ren Shizhe 25' (o.g.); Eddy Francis 45+2'; Fei Ernanduo 56'; Zhou Junchen 63'; Xu Yougang 79'	Report	Luo Jing 69'	Referee: Xing Qi

5 January 2023	Shanghai Port (1)	4–0	Chengdu Rongcheng (1)	Suzhou Sports Center, Suzhou
14:00 UTC+8	Wang Shenchao 31'; Lü Wenjun 54'; Kallon 74'; Wu Lei 90+4'	Report		Referee: Wang Jing

5 January 2023	Zhejiang (1)	3–0	Jinan Xingzhou (3)	Suzhou Olympic Sports Centre, Suzhou
16:30 UTC+8	Gao Di 28'; Yao Junsheng 67'; Wang Dongsheng 90+2'	Report		Referee: Zhang Lei

=== Second leg ===
7 January 2023	Cangzhou Mighty Lions (1)	0–2 (1–7 agg.)	Shanghai Shenhua (1)	Suzhou Sports Center, Suzhou
14:00 UTC+8		Report	Fei Ernanduo 31'; Yang Zexiang 90+2'	Referee: Zhang Xiaochen

7 January 2023	Wuhan Three Towns (1)	0–3 (1–6 agg.)	Shandong Taishan (1)	Suzhou Olympic Sports Centre, Suzhou
16:30 UTC+8		Report	Moisés 30' (pen.), 55'; Son Jun-ho 43'	Referee: Yu Bo

8 January 2023	Jinan Xingzhou (3)	1–2 (1–5 agg.)	Zhejiang (1)	Suzhou Sports Center, Suzhou
14:00 UTC+8	Tan Tiancheng 70'	Report	Gao Di 4', 47'	Referee: Wan Tao

8 January 2023	Chengdu Rongcheng (1)	0–4 (0–8 agg.)	Shanghai Port (1)	Suzhou Olympic Sports Centre, Suzhou
16:30 UTC+8		Report	Wu Lei 43'; Liu Zhurun 83'; Oscar 90+1'; Ablahan Haliq 90+3'	Referee: Liu Wei

== Semi-finals ==
11 January 2023	Shanghai Shenhua (1)	0–2	Shandong Taishan (1)	Suzhou Sports Center, Suzhou
14:00 UTC+8		Report	Song Long 77'; Moisés 84' (pen.)	Referee: Shi Zhenlu

11 January 2023	Zhejiang (1)	0–0 (5–3 p)	Shanghai Port (1)	Suzhou Olympic Sports Centre, Suzhou
16:30 UTC+8		Report		Referee: Wang Zhe
	Penalties
	Andrijašević (penalty scored); Lucas (penalty scored); Yao Junsheng (penalty scored); Gao Di (penalty scored); Mushekwi (penalty scored)		(penalty missed) Lü Wenjun; (penalty scored) Wu Lei; (penalty scored) Vargas; (penalty scored) Zhang Linpeng

== Final ==
15 January 2023
15:30 UTC+8

Zhejiang (1)	1–2	Shandong Taishan (1)
Gu Bin 36'	Report	Chen Pu 53'; Zhang Jiaqi 88' (o.g.)

Suzhou Olympic Sports Centre, Suzhou
Attendance: 21,079
Referee: Li Haixin

GK	33	(China) Zhao Bo
CB	36	(Brazil) Lucas
CB	29	(China) Zhang Jiaqi	(substituted off) 90'
CB	2	(Hong Kong) Leung Nok Hang
RWB	28	(China) Yue Xin
LWB	19	(China) Dong Yu
CM	31	(China) Gu Bin	(substituted off) 82'
CM	11	(Croatia) Franko Andrijašević (c)
CM	6	(China) Yao Junsheng	(substituted off) 90'
CF	7	(Cameroon) Donovan Ewolo
CF	30	(Zimbabwe) Nyasha Mushekwi
Substitutes:
GK	1	(China) Gu Chao
GK	12	(China) Lai Jinfeng
DF	3	(China) Wang Yang
DF	4	(China) Sun Zheng'ao	(substituted on) 90'
DF	17	(China) Long Wei
MF	8	(China) Zhong Haoran
MF	18	(China) Ablikim Abdusalam	(substituted on) 90'
MF	20	(China) Wang Dongsheng
MF	26	(China) Gao Tianyu
MF	27	(China) Zheng Xuejian
FW	9	(China) Gao Di	(substituted on) 82'
FW	13	(China) Li Yalun
Manager:
(Spain) Jordi Vinyals

GK	14	(China) Wang Dalei
RB	6	(China) Wang Tong	(substituted off) 46'
CB	27	(China) Shi Ke
CB	5	(China) Zheng Zheng (c)
LB	39	(China) Song Long
RM	13	(China) Zhang Chi	(substituted off) 76'
CM	37	(China) Ji Xiang	(substituted off) 60'
CM	28	(South Korea) Son Jun-ho
LM	29	(China) Chen Pu
CF	10	(Brazil) Moisés
CF	11	(China) Liu Yang	(substituted off) 76'
Substitutes:
GK	18	(China) Han Rongze
DF	4	(Brazil) Jadson
DF	15	(China) Qi Tianyu	(substituted on) 76'
DF	16	(China) Li Hailong	(substituted on) 76'
DF	30	(China) Abdurasul Abudulam
DF	31	(China) Zhao Jianfei
DF	35	(China) Dai Lin
MF	17	(China) Wu Xinghan	(substituted on) 46'
MF	33	(China) Jin Jingdao	(substituted on) 60'
MF	34	(China) Huang Cong
MF	36	(China) Duan Liuyu
FW	32	(China) Tian Xin
Manager:
(China) Hao Wei

Assistant referees:
Cao Yi
Shi Xiang
Fourth official:
Wang Zhe
Video assistant referee:
Shi Zhenlu
Assistant video assistant referees:
Zhang Lei
