= Gu Bin =

Chinese footballer

Gu Bin 顾斌
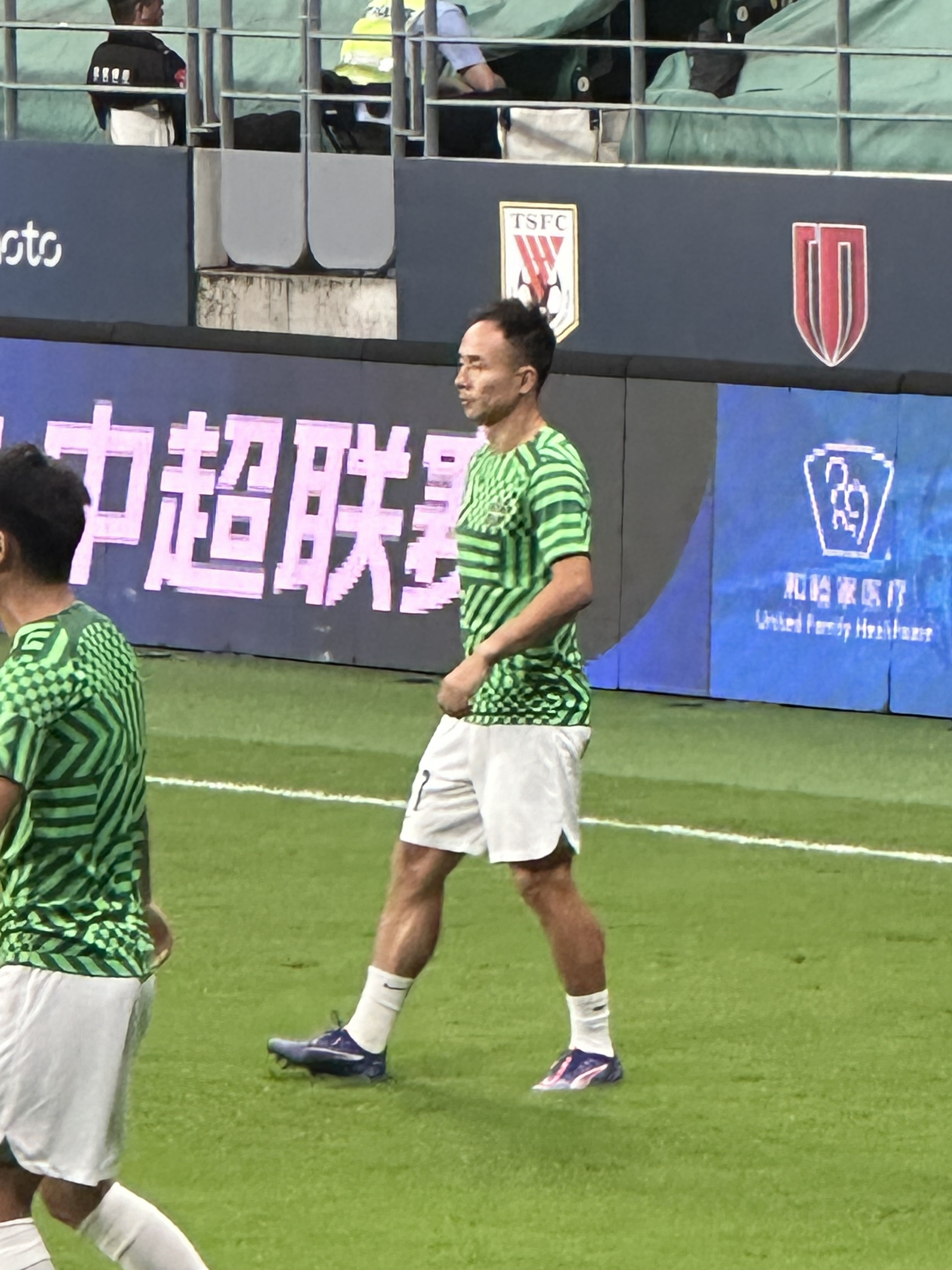
- Gu in August 2024

Personal information
- Full name: Gu Bin
- Date of birth: 10 November 1991 (age 35)
- Place of birth: Shanghai, China
- Height: 1.73 m (5 ft 8 in)
- Positions: Central midfielder; left winger

Senior career*
Years	Team	Apps	(Gls)
2009–2014	Shanghai Shenhua	4	(0)
2011	→ Sūduva (loan)	11	(0)
2013	→ Chongqing FC (loan)	16	(0)
2016–2018	Shanghai Shenxin	82	(11)
2019–2024	Zhejiang FC	120	(6)
2025	Eastern	11	(0)
2025–2026	Eastern District	13	(1)
- * Club domestic league appearances and goals as of 16 May 2026

Gu Bin (Chinese: 顾斌; born 10 November 1991 in Shanghai) is a Chinese former professional footballer who played as a central midfielder or a left winger.

== Early life ==
Gu Bin was born on 10 November 1991 into a family in Shanghai. When he was 2 years old, his parents divorced and his mother left the family. His father would die of lung cancer when he was 14, and he would be subsequently taken care of by his uncle and aunt. He received his preliminary education in the Fourth Preliminary School of Pingliang Road, a school famous for national footballers, but his family was too poor to afford a pair of football boots, let alone the costs of professional training after the preliminary school. His uncle tried to seek help from the Genbao Football Base, but before he could introduce Gu Bin, the academy refused him by claiming that all the youths in his age group in Shanghai had already been selected. Fortunately for Gu in 2008, Shanghai Shenhua took exception to him and offered him a professional contract.

== Club career ==
At Shanghai Shenhua, Gu's skills and hard-work would impress the coaching staff, while his teammates nicknamed him as "Junior Hidetoshi Nakata". Su Maozhen, the coach and former Chinese international footballer would view Gu Bin as a talented and promising young player who is fast, agile in dribbling and gifted with a left foot that can always break through opponent's defences. With these praises from the coaching staff it would see Gu Bin promoted to the senior team in the 2009 league season. This was followed by selection to the Chinese U19 national team before being sent to Atletico de Madrid to train with the reserve team and study Spanish football in 2010.

In July 2011, Gu was loaned to A Lyga side FK Sūduva until 31 December. On 14 July 2011, Gu made his debut for FK Sūduva in the last group match of the 2011–12 UEFA Europa League against IF Elfsborg. This would be followed by his league debut on 24 July 2011 against FK Šiauliai in a 1–0 defeat. After his loan move Gu would return to Shenhua and the interim Head coach Florent Ibengé would hand him his debut on 28 April 2012 in a league game against Shandong Luneng, which ended in a 0–0 draw. In 2013, Gu would move to China League One side Chongqing F.C. on a one-year loan deal to gain more playing time. When he returned to Shenhua he was unused throughout the whole of the 2014 Chinese Super League campaign and was subsequently released at the end of the season.

Gu would join second-tier club Shanghai Shenxin at the beginning of the 2016 league season on a free transfer and would go on to make his debut in a league game on 13 March 2016 against Dalian Transcendence F.C. that ended in a 3–1 defeat. On 2 February 2019, Gu transferred to fellow League One side Zhejiang Greentown. He would make his debut in a league game on 10 March 2019 against Qingdao Huanghai in a 2–1 defeat. He would then play a vital part as the club gained promotion to the top tier at the end of the 2021 campaign. On 15 January 2023, Gu opened the scoring against Shandong Taishan in the 2022 Chinese FA Cup final, however Shandong came from behind to win the game 2–1.

On 17 January 2025, Gu departed Zhejiang FC after six years and joined Hong Kong Premier League club Eastern.

On 23 July 2025, Gu joined Eastern District.

== Career statistics ==
As of match played 14 March 2026.

Appearances and goals by club, season and competition
Club	Season	League			National Cup		League Cup		Continental		Other		Total	
Club	Season	Division	Apps	Goals	Apps	Goals	Apps	Goals	Apps	Goals	Apps	Goals	Apps	Goals
Shanghai Shenhua	2009	Chinese Super League	0	0	-		-		0	0	-		0	0
Shanghai Shenhua	2010	Chinese Super League	0	0	-		-		-		-		0	0
Shanghai Shenhua	2012	Chinese Super League	4	0	0	0	-		-		-		4	0
Shanghai Shenhua	2014	Chinese Super League	0	0	0	0	-		-		-		0	0
Shanghai Shenhua	Total		4	0	0	0	0	0	0	0	0	0	4	0
FK Sūduva (loan)	2011	A Lyga	11	0	0	0	0	0	2	0	-		13	0
Chongqing F.C. (loan)	2013	China League One	16	0	1	0	-		-		-		17	0
Shanghai Shenxin	2016	China League One	29	3	1	0	-		-		-		30	3
Shanghai Shenxin	2017	China League One	28	6	2	0	-		-		-		30	6
Shanghai Shenxin	2018	China League One	25	2	2	0	-		-		-		27	2
Shanghai Shenxin	Total		82	11	5	0	0	0	0	0	0	0	87	11
Zhejiang FC	2019	China League One	18	1	1	0	-		-		-		19	1
Zhejiang FC	2020	China League One	10	1	0	0	-		-		0 (Note: Appearances in Promotion/Relegation Play-offs)	0	10	1
Zhejiang FC	2021	China League One	31	3	0	0	-		-		2	0	33	3
Zhejiang FC	2022	Chinese Super League	25	0	4	1	-		-		-		29	1
Zhejiang FC	2023	Chinese Super League	23	0	1	0	-		4 (Note: Three appearances in 2023–24 AFC Champions League, one appearance in qualification)	0	-		28	0
Zhejiang FC	2024	Chinese Super League	11	1	1	0	-		5 (Note: Appearances in 2024–25 AFC Champions League Two)	0	-		17	1
Zhejiang FC	Total		118	6	7	1	0	0	9	0	2	0	136	7
Eastern	2024–25	Hong Kong Premier League	11	0	1	0	0	0	-		1 (Note: Appearances in Hong Kong Sapling Cup)	0	12	0
Eastern District	2025–26	Hong Kong Premier League	10	1	1	0	2	0	-		1 (Note: Appearances in Hong Kong Senior Shield)	0	14	1
Career total			252	18	15	1	2	0	11	0	4	0	284	19

== Honour ==
Eastern

- Hong Kong FA Cup: 2024–25
