= Liu Zhurun =

Chinese association football player

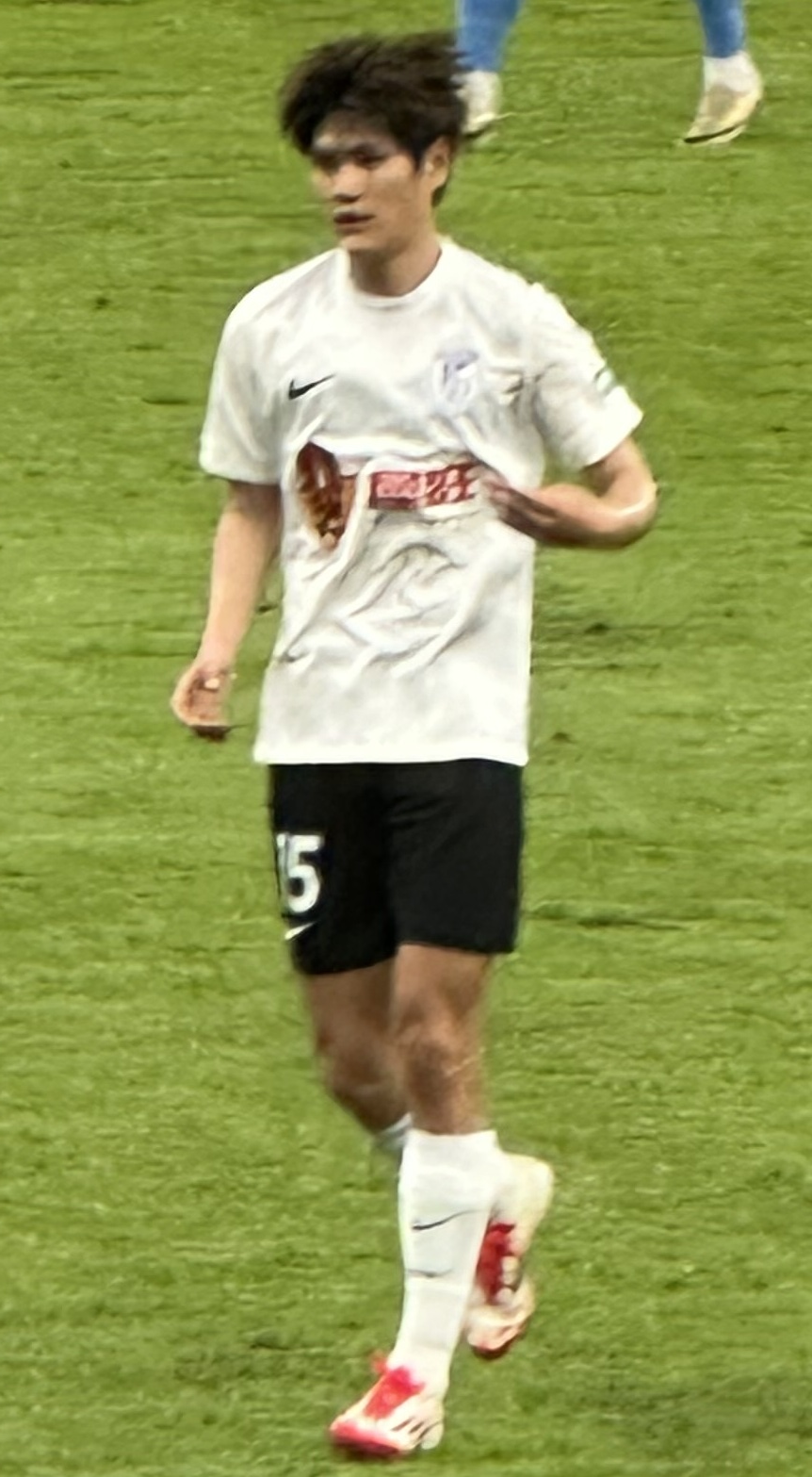
- Liu Zhurun in April 2025

Personal information
- Date of birth: 6 October 2001 (age 25)
- Place of birth: Fuyang, Anhui, China
- Height: 1.83 m (6 ft 0 in)
- Position: Forward

Team information
- Current team: Shanghai Port
- Number: 33

Youth career
- –2020: Shanghai SIPG

Senior career*
Years	Team	Apps	(Gls)
2020–	Shanghai Port	62	(7)
2025	→ Dalian Yingbo (loan)	24	(5)

International career^{‡}
2018	China U16	2	(0)
2022–2024	China U23	5	(0)
2022–	China	2	(0)
Medal record
Representing China
Men's football
EAFF Championship
Bronze medal – third place	2022 Japan	Team
- * Club domestic league appearances and goals as of 19 November 2026 ‡ National team caps and goals as of 27 July 2022

Liu Zhurun (Chinese: 刘祝润; born 6 October 2001) is a Chinese professional footballer currently playing as a forward for Chinese Super League club Shanghai Port, and the China national team.

== Club career ==
Liu made his professional debut on 4 December 2020 in a 2-0 defeat against Jeonbuk Hyundai Motors in the 2020 AFC Champions League group stage. On 11 May 2021, Liu made his Chinese Super League debut in a 0-0 draw against Changchun Yatai. He scored his first goal for the club on 24 October 2021 in a 3-0 win against Dalian Professional in the first leg of the 2021 Chinese FA Cup quarter-final, and he finished the 2021 season with 5 goals, 2 of them in the league and 3 in the Chinese FA Cup.

== International career ==
On 20 July 2022, Liu made his international debut in a 3-0 defeat against South Korea in the 2022 EAFF E-1 Football Championship, as the Chinese FA decided to field the U-23 national team for this senior competition.

== Career statistics ==
=== Club ===
As of match played 1 March 2026.

Appearances and goals by club, season and competition
Club	Season	League			Cup		Continental		Other		Total	
Club	Season	Division	Apps	Goals	Apps	Goals	Apps	Goals	Apps	Goals	Apps	Goals
Shanghai Port	2020	Chinese Super League	0	0	0	0	1	0	–		1	0
Shanghai Port	2021	Chinese Super League	10	2	7	3	0	0	–		17	5
Shanghai Port	2022	Chinese Super League	17	2	3	1	–		–		20	3
Shanghai Port	2023	Chinese Super League	1	0	0	0	0	0	–		1	0
Shanghai Port	2024	Chinese Super League	8	0	2	0	1	0	0	0	11	0
Shanghai Port	2026	Chinese Super League	0	0	0	0	2	0	1	0	3	0
Shanghai Port	Total		36	4	12	4	4	0	1	0	53	8
Dalian Yingbo (loan)	2025	Chinese Super League	24	5	1	0	–		–		25	5
Career total			60	9	13	4	4	0	1	0	78	13

== Honours ==
Shanghai Port

- Chinese Super League: 2023, 2024
- Chinese FA Cup: 2024
