= Jadson (footballer, born November 1991) =

Brazilian footballer

Personal information
- Full name: Jadson Cristiano Silva de Morais
- Date of birth: 5 November 1991 (age 35)
- Place of birth: Rio de Janeiro, Brazil
- Height: 1.89 m (6 ft 2 in)
- Position: Centre-back

Senior career*
Years	Team	Apps	(Gls)
2014	America	13	(2)
2015	Bonsucesso	15	(0)
2015–2022	Portimonense	112	(13)
2020–2021	→ Vasco da Gama (loan)	5	(0)
2021	→ Wuhan Three Towns (loan)	7	(0)
2021	→ Shandong Taishan (loan)	9	(3)
2022–2024	Shandong Taishan	56	(9)
- * Club domestic league appearances and goals as of 20 April 2024

Jadson Cristiano Silva de Morais (born 5 November 1991), known as Jadson, is a Brazilian professional footballer who plays as a centre-back.

== Club career ==
=== Early career ===
Jadson played for Brazilian side America before joining Campeonato Carioca club Bonsucesso, where he made his debut for them in a league game on 31 January 2015 against Resende that ended in a 1-0 defeat.

=== Portimonense ===
After a season, Jadson joined Portuguese second tier club Portimonense where he integrated himself into the team before going on to win the 2016–17 LigaPro division title and promotion to the top tier with them.

His first season within the top tier of Portuguese initially saw him struggle to gain much playing time; however the following season he established himself as part of the team's defence as he helped keep the club within the division. Jadson was part of the team that finished in the relegation zone at the end of the 2019–20 Primeira Liga season; however they were given a reprieve after Vitória de Setúbal failed to gain a licence for the next season and were administratively relegated to the third-tier Campeonato de Portugal.

==== Loan to Vasco da Gama ====
Jadson returned to Brazil to join top tier club Vasco da Gama on loan.

==== Loan to Wuhan Three Towns ====
This was followed by another loan period, to China to join second tier club Wuhan Three Towns on 26 February 2021.

==== Loan to Shandong Taishan ====
After seven games, in which Wuhan took the lead in the division, Jadson returned to Portimonense who loaned him out to top tier Chinese club Shandong Taishan on 27 July 2021 for the remainder of the 2021 season. Jadson gained his first league title with the club when he was part of the team that won the 2021 Chinese Super League title.

=== Shandong Taishan ===
In the following season Jadson's move was made permanent and he was part of the team winning the 2022 Chinese FA Cup the next season. On 20 February 2024 during the 2023–24 AFC Champions League Round of 16 fixture against Japanese side Kawasaki Frontale, Jadson scored a last minute winner in the 90+7 minute injury time which put Shandong Taishan to qualified to the quarter-finals on a 6–5 aggregate.

On 23 January 2025, Jadson announced his departure of the club after the 2024 season.

== Career statistics ==
As of match played 30 June 2024.

Appearances and goals by club, season and competition
Club	Season	League			State League		Cup		League Cup		Continental		Other		Total	
Club	Season	Division	Apps	Goals	Apps	Goals	Apps	Goals	Apps	Goals	Apps	Goals	Apps	Goals	Apps	Goals
America	2014	—			13 (Note: Appearances in the Campeonato Carioca Série A2)	2	0	0	—		—		0	0	13	2
Bonsucesso	2015	—			15 (Note: Appearances in the Campeonato Carioca)	0	0	0	—		—		0	0	15	0
Portimonense	2015–16	LigaPro	35	6	—		1	0	4	0	—		—		40	6
Portimonense	2016–17	LigaPro	22	2	—		0	0	1	0	—		—		23	2
Portimonense	2017–18	Primeira Liga	3	0	—		1	0	1	1	—		—		5	1
Portimonense	2018–19	Primeira Liga	21	2	—		0	0	0	0	—		—		21	2
Portimonense	2019–20	Primeira Liga	31	3	—		0	0	2	0	—		—		33	3
Portimonense	2020–21	Primeira Liga	0	0	—		0	0	0	0	—		—		0	0
Portimonense	Total		112	13	—		2	0	8	1	—		—		122	14
Vasco da Gama (Loan)	2020	Série A	5	0	0	0	0	0	—		0	0	—		5	0
Wuhan Three Towns (Loan)	2021	China League One	7	0	—		0	0	—		—		—		7	0
Shandong Taishan (Loan)	2021	Chinese Super League	9	3	—		5	1	—		—		—		14	4
Shandong Taishan	2022	Chinese Super League	19	1	—		1	0	—		0	0	—		20	1
Shandong Taishan	2023	Chinese Super League	17	3	—		3	1	—		8	2	1 (Note: Appearances in the Chinese Super Cup)	0	29	6
Shandong Taishan	2024	Chinese Super League	10	2	—		1	1	—		2	0	—		13	3
Shandong Taishan	Total		55	9	—		10	3	—		10	2	1	0	76	14
Career total			179	22	28	2	12	3	8	1	10	2	1	0	238	30

== Honours ==
Portimonense

- LigaPro: 2016–17

Wuhan Three Towns

- China League One: 2021

Shandong Luneng

- Chinese FA Cup Best player: 2021
- Chinese Super League: 2021
- Chinese FA Cup: 2021, 2022.
