= Zhao Jianfei =

Chinese association football player

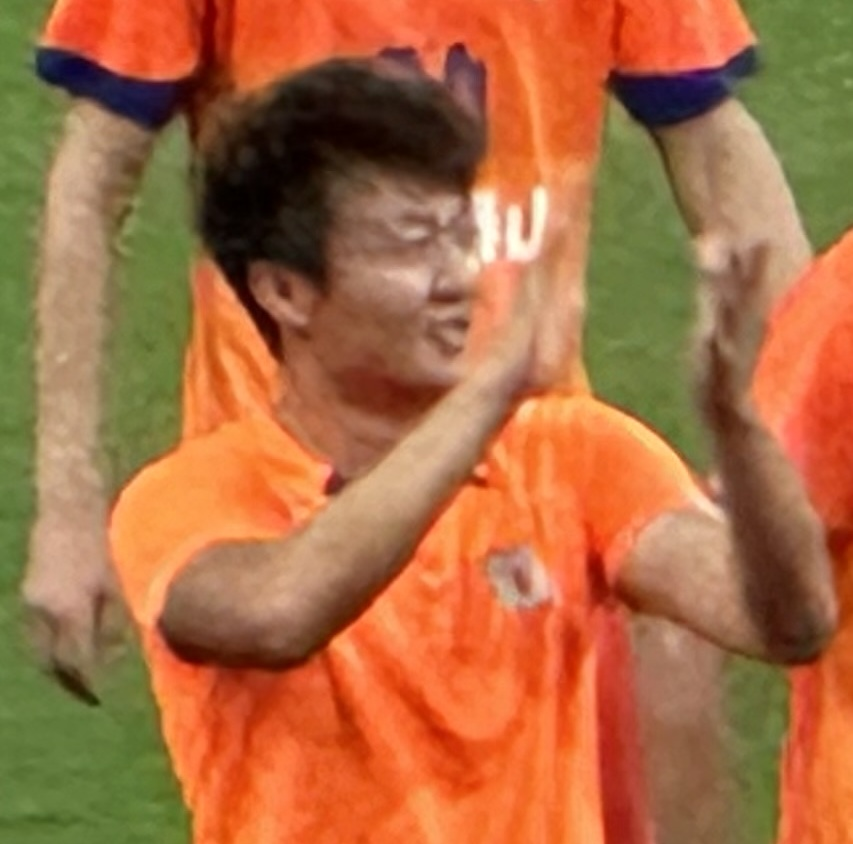
- Zhao Jianfei in August 2024

Personal information
- Date of birth: 21 January 1999 (age 27)
- Place of birth: Pingdingshan, Henan, China
- Height: 1.84 m (6 ft 0 in)
- Position: Defender

Team information
- Current team: Shenzhen Peng City (on loan from Shandong Taishan)
- Number: 25

Youth career
- 2017: Shandong Luneng

Senior career*
Years	Team	Apps	(Gls)
2018–	Shandong Taishan	35	(0)
2020	→ Shijiazhuang Ever Bright (loan)	4	(0)
2026–	→ Shenzhen Peng City (loan)	7	(0)

International career^{‡}
2019–2021	China U23	1	(0)
- * Club domestic league appearances and goals as of 22 November 2026 ‡ National team caps and goals as of 31 December 2019

Zhao Jianfei (simplified Chinese: 赵剑非; traditional Chinese: 趙劍非; pinyin: Zhào Jiànfēi; born 21 January 1999) is a Chinese footballer currently playing as a defender for Chinese Super League club Shenzhen Peng City, on loan from Shandong Taishan.

== Club career ==
Zhao Jianfei would play for the Shandong Luneng (now renamed Shandong Taishan) youth team and the various age groups for the Chinese national team. At the start of the 2018 Chinese Super League he was officially promoted to the Shandong senior team. He would eventually go on to make his debut in a league game on 14 April 2019 against Dalian Yifang in 1-0 defeat. While on duty with the Chinese U23 team at the 2020 AFC U-23 Championship during a press conference Zhao claimed that his monthly contract was 20,000 Yuan at Shandong.

On 30 September 2020, he was loaned out to fellow top tier club Shijiazhuang Ever Bright for the remainder of the 2020 Chinese Super League season. On his return to Shandong he would be used as a squad player within the team and would gain his first league title with the club when he was part of the team that won the 2021 Chinese Super League title. This would be followed up by him winning the 2022 Chinese FA Cup with them the next season.

On 11 July 2026, Zhao was loaned to Chinese Super League club Shenzhen Peng City for the rest of 2026 season.

== Career statistics ==
As of 14 March 2024.

Club	Season	League			Cup		Continental		Other		Total	
Club	Season	Division	Apps	Goals	Apps	Goals	Apps	Goals	Apps	Goals	Apps	Goals
Shandong Luneng/ Shandong Taishan	2018	Chinese Super League	0	0	0	0	–		–		0	0
Shandong Luneng/ Shandong Taishan	2019	Chinese Super League	7	0	1	0	0 (Note: Appearances in AFC Champions League)	0	–		8	0
Shandong Luneng/ Shandong Taishan	2020	Chinese Super League	2	0	1	0	–		–		3	0
Shandong Luneng/ Shandong Taishan	2021	Chinese Super League	0	0	3	0	–		–		3	0
Shandong Luneng/ Shandong Taishan	2022	Chinese Super League	5	0	2	0	0	0	–		7	0
Shandong Luneng/ Shandong Taishan	2023	Chinese Super League	2	0	3	0	2	0	0 (Note: Appearances in Chinese FA Super Cup)	0	7	0
Shandong Luneng/ Shandong Taishan	2024	Chinese Super League	4	0	0	0	0	0	–		4	0
Shandong Luneng/ Shandong Taishan	Total		20	0	10	0	2	0	0	0	32	0
Shijiazhuang Ever Bright (loan)	2020	Chinese Super League	4	0	0	0	–		–		4	0
Career total			24	0	10	0	2	0	0	0	36	0

== Honours ==
=== Club ===
Shandong Luneng/ Shandong Taishan

- Chinese Super League: 2021
- Chinese FA Cup: 2020, 2021, 2022.
