= Wang Haochen =

Chinese association football player

Personal information
- Date of birth: 22 January 1999 (age 27)
- Position: Midfielder

Team information
- Current team: Beijing BSU
- Number: 22

Youth career
- Atlético Madrid
- Josep María Gené

Senior career*
Years	Team	Apps	(Gls)
2018	Olimpic Can Fatjó	3	(0)
2019	Granollers	5	(0)
2020	Hebei Zhuoao	5	(0)
2021–	Beijing BSU	5	(0)
- * Club domestic league appearances and goals as of 14:01, 25 July 2021 (UTC)

Wang Haochen (Chinese: 王昊晨; born 22 January 1999) is a Chinese footballer currently playing as a midfielder for Beijing BSU.

== Career statistics ==
=== Club ===
As of 31 May 2023.

Club	Season	League			Cup		Other		Total	
Club	Season	Division	Apps	Goals	Apps	Goals	Apps	Goals	Apps	Goals
Olimpic Can Fatjó	2018–19	Segona Catalana	3	0	0	0	–		3	0
Granollers	2018–19	Tercera División	5	0	0	0	–		5	0
Hebei Zhuoao	2020	China League Two	5	0	0	0	–		5	0
Beijing BSU	2021	China League One	9	1	2	0	–		11	1
Beijing BSU	2022	China League One	33	4	1	1	–		34	5
Beijing BSU	Total		42	5	3	1	0	0	45	6
Shijiazhuang Gongfu	2023	China League One	1	0	1	0	–		2	0
Career total			56	4	4	1	0	0	60	6
