= Li Shenyuan =

Chinese association football player

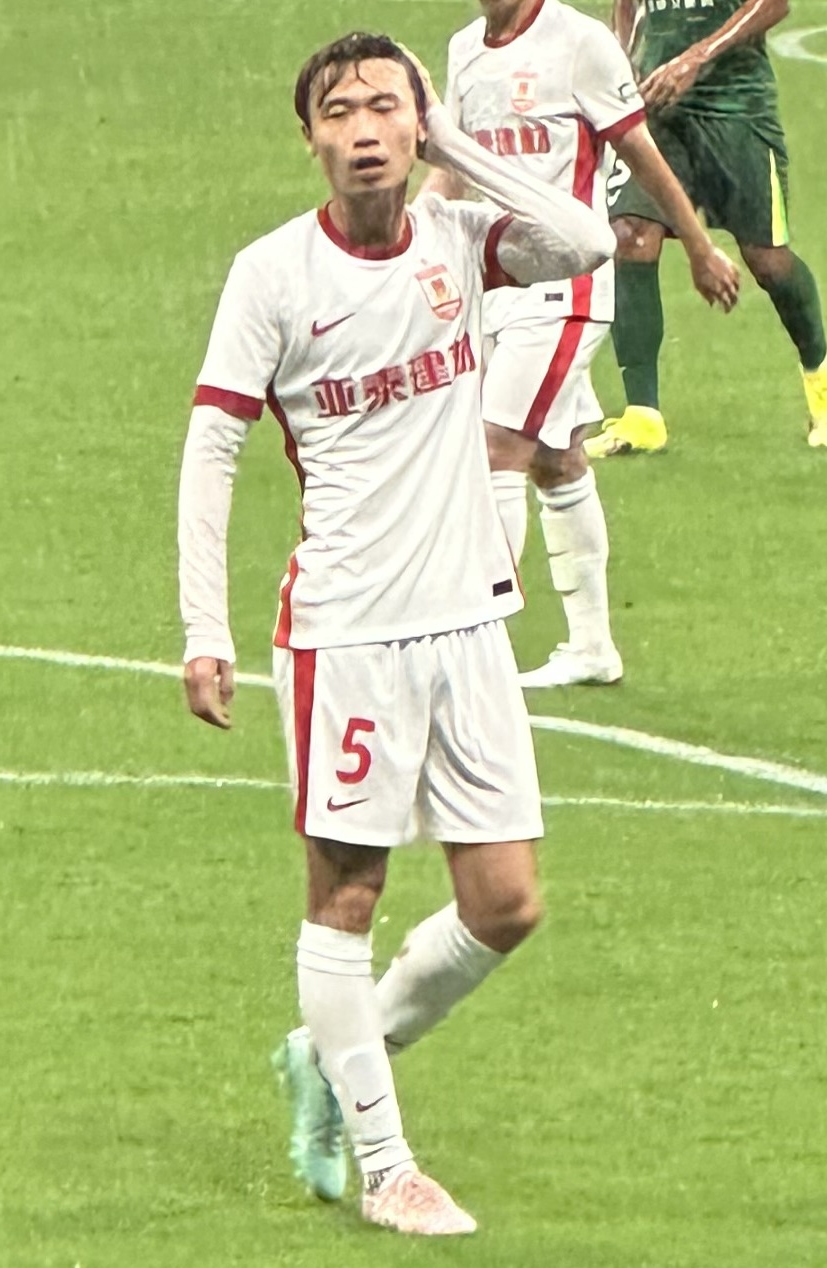
- Li Shenyuan in June 2025

Personal information
- Date of birth: 2 October 1997 (age 29)
- Place of birth: Chaohu, Anhui, China
- Height: 1.80 m (5 ft 11 in)
- Position: Right-back

Team information
- Current team: Wuhan Three Towns
- Number: 5

Youth career
- –2020: Changchun Yatai

Senior career*
Years	Team	Apps	(Gls)
2020–2024	Shanghai Port	42	(2)
2020	→ Inner Mongolia Zhongyou (loan)	14	(0)
2024	→ Changchun Yatai (loan)	25	(0)
2025	Changchun Yatai	20	(0)
2026–	Wuhan Three Towns	11	(0)

International career^{‡}
2018	China U21	2	(0)
- * Club domestic league appearances and goals as of 22 November ‡ National team caps and goals as of 14:01, 17 May 2021 (UTC)

Li Shenyuan (Chinese: 李申圆; born 2 October 1997) is a Chinese footballer currently playing as a right-back for Wuhan Three Towns.

== Club career ==
Li Shenyuan would play for the Shanghai Port youth team before being sent to second tier football club Inner Mongolia Zhongyou on 29 July 2020 on loan. He would go on to make his professional debut on 13 September 2020 for Inner Mongolia Zhongyou in a league game against Beijing BSU in a 1-0 defeat. On his return to Shanghai Port he was immediately promoted to the senior team where he would make his debut on 26 November 2020 in the Chinese FA Cup against Changchun Yatai in a 4-0 defeat.

On 31 December 2024, Li was released by Shanghai Port after his contract was expired.

On 26 January 2026, Li joined Chinese Super League club Wuhan Three Towns.

== Career statistics ==
As of 31 December 2024.

Club	Season	League			National Cup		Continental		Other		Total	
Club	Season	Division	Apps	Goals	Apps	Goals	Apps	Goals	Apps	Goals	Apps	Goals
Shanghai Port	2020	Chinese Super League	0	0	1	0	0	0	–		1	0
Shanghai Port	2021	Chinese Super League	16	2	6	2	0	0	–		22	4
Shanghai Port	2022	Chinese Super League	22	0	2	0	–		–		24	0
Shanghai Port	2023	Chinese Super League	4	0	2	0	0	0	–		6	0
Shanghai Port	Total		42	2	11	2	0	0	0	0	53	4
Inner Mongolia Zhongyou (loan)	2020	China League One	14	0	0	0	–		–		14	0
Changchun Yatai (loan)	2024	Chinese Super League	25	0	2	0	–		–		27	0
Career total			81	2	13	2	0	0	0	0	94	4

== Honours ==
Shanghai Port

- Chinese Super League: 2023
