= Wang Hanlin =

Chinese footballer

Wang Hanlin 王翰林
Personal information
- Date of birth: November 11, 1989 (age 37)
- Place of birth: Dalian, Liaoning, China
- Height: 1.78 m (5 ft 10 in)
- Position: Defender

Team information
- Current team: Chengdu Rongcheng
- Number: 28

Senior career*
Years	Team	Apps	(Gls)
2010–2014	Chengdu Tiancheng	28	(0)
2016–2017	Jiangxi Liansheng	33	(0)
2018–	Chengdu Rongcheng	14	(0)
- * Club domestic league appearances and goals as of 8 January 2023

Wang Hanlin (Chinese: 王翰林; born 11 November 1989 in Dalian, Liaoning) is a Chinese footballer who currently plays as a defender for Chengdu Rongcheng.

== Club career ==
In 2010, Wang Hanlin started his professional footballer career with Chengdu Tiancheng in the China League One. He would eventually make his top tier league debut for Chengdu on 6 July 2011 in a game against Guangzhou Evergrande, coming on as a substitute for Zhang Li in the 79th minute, in a game that ended in a 4-0 defeat. Unfortunately he would be part of the team that was relegated at the end of the season, however he would go on to establish himself as a regular within the team until 5 January 2015 when the club dissolved due to financial arrears.

In March 2016, Wang signed for China League Two side Jiangxi Liansheng. He would play for two seasons until he joined Chengdu Better City (now renamed as Chengdu Rongcheng) as they participated in the 2018 Chinese Champions League. He would go on to win promotion with the club as they came runners-up at the end of the 2019 China League Two season. He would be a regular within the team as he aided them to a meteoric rise through the divisions as the club gained promotion to the top tier at the end of the 2021 league campaign.

== Career statistics ==
Statistics accurate as of match played 8 January 2023.

Appearances and goals by club, season and competition
Club	Season	League			National Cup		Continental		Other		Total	
Club	Season	Division	Apps	Goals	Apps	Goals	Apps	Goals	Apps	Goals	Apps	Goals
Chengdu Tiancheng	2010	China League One	1	0	-		-		-		1	0
Chengdu Tiancheng	2011	Chinese Super League	1	0	0	0	-		-		1	0
Chengdu Tiancheng	2012	China League One	3	0	2	0	-		-		5	0
Chengdu Tiancheng	2013	China League One	13	0	1	0	-		-		14	0
Chengdu Tiancheng	2014	China League One	10	0	1	1	-		-		11	1
Chengdu Tiancheng	Total		28	0	4	1	0	0	0	0	32	1
Jiangxi Liansheng	2016	China League Two	16	0	1	0	-		-		17	0
Jiangxi Liansheng	2017	China League Two	17	0	2	0	-		-		19	0
Jiangxi Liansheng	Total		33	0	3	0	0	0	0	0	36	0
Chengdu Rongcheng	2018	Chinese Champions League	-		-		-		-		-	-
Chengdu Rongcheng	2019	China League Two	1	0	0	0	-		-		1	0
Chengdu Rongcheng	2020	China League One	4	0	1	0	-		-		5	0
Chengdu Rongcheng	2021	China League One	8	0	3	0	-		0 (Note: Appearance(s) in CSL Relegation play-offs)	0	11	0
Chengdu Rongcheng	2022	Chinese Super League	1	0	3	0	-		-		4	0
Chengdu Rongcheng	Total		14	0	7	0	0	0	0	0	21	0
Career total			75	0	14	1	0	0	0	0	89	1
