= Bebet Murat =

Chinese association football player

Personal information
- Date of birth: 25 November 1999 (age 26)
- Height: 1.78 m (5 ft 10 in)
- Position: Midfielder

Team information
- Current team: Xinjiang Tianshan Leopard
- Number: 22

Senior career*
Years	Team	Apps	(Gls)
2018–2023	Xinjiang Tianshan Leopard	47	(0)
- * Club domestic league appearances and goals as of 14:01, 9 August 2021 (UTC)

Bebet Murat (Chinese: 拜拜提·木拉提; born 25 November 1999) is a Chinese footballer most recently as a midfielder for Xinjiang Tianshan Leopard.

== Career statistics ==
=== Club ===
As of 17 August 2021.

Club	Season	League			Cup		Other		Total	
Club	Season	Division	Apps	Goals	Apps	Goals	Apps	Goals	Apps	Goals
Xinjiang Tianshan Leopard	2018	China League One	0	0	1 (Note: Appearances in the Chinese FA Cup)	0	0	0	1	0
Xinjiang Tianshan Leopard	2019	China League One	26	0	0	0	0	0	26	0
Xinjiang Tianshan Leopard	2020	China League One	14	0	0	0	2 (Note: Appearances in the China League One playoffs)	0	16	0
Xinjiang Tianshan Leopard	2021	China League One	7	0	0	0	0	0	7	0
Career total			47	0	1	0	2	0	50	0
