= Deng Jiaxing =

Chinese association football player

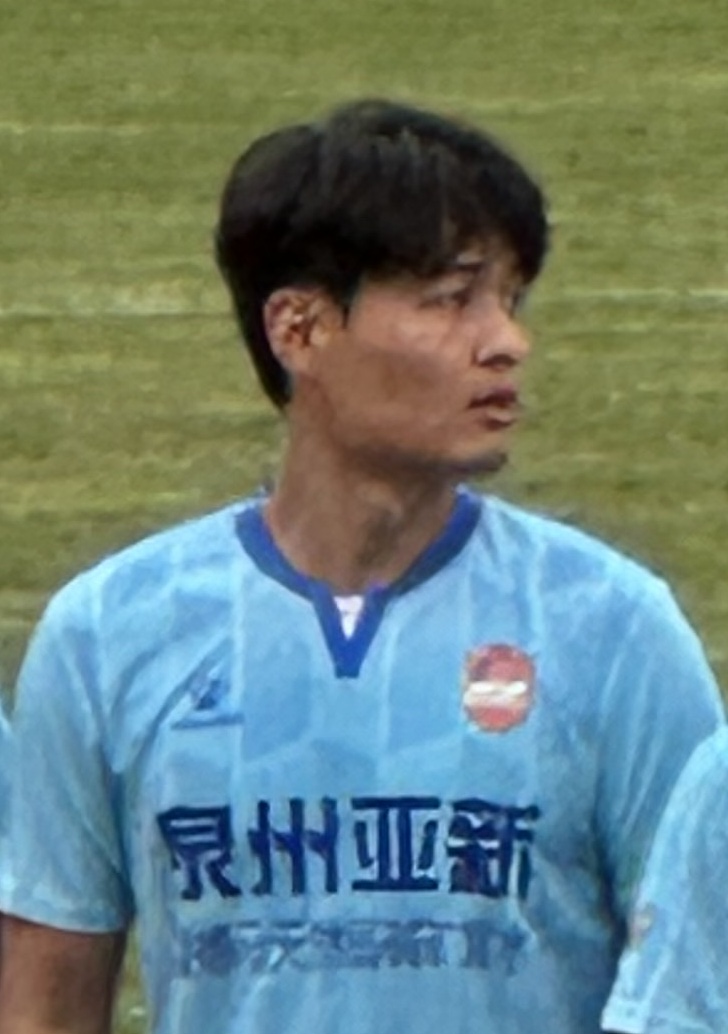
- Deng Jiaxing in August 2024

Personal information
- Date of birth: 19 October 2000 (age 26)
- Height: 1.83 m (6 ft 0 in)
- Position: Forward

Team information
- Current team: Jiangxi Beidamen
- Number: 13

Youth career
- –2021: Chongqing Liangjiang Athletic

Senior career*
Years	Team	Apps	(Gls)
2021	Chongqing Liangjiang Athletic	4	(0)
2022–	Jiangxi Beidamen	0	(0)
- * Club domestic league appearances and goals as of 08:01, 27 April 2022 (UTC)

Deng Jiaxing (Chinese: 邓佳星; born 19 October 2000) is a Chinese footballer currently playing as a forward for Jiangxi Beidamen.

== Career statistics ==
=== Club ===
As of 7 December 2022.

Club	Season	League			National Cup		Continental		Other		Total	
Club	Season	Division	Apps	Goals	Apps	Goals	Apps	Goals	Apps	Goals	Apps	Goals
Chongqing Liangjiang Athletic	2021	Chinese Super League	4	0	0	0	–		–		4	0
Jiangxi Beidamen	2022	China League One	24	0	2	1	–		–		26	1
Career total			28	0	2	1	0	0	0	0	30	1
