= Chen Guokang =

Chinese association football player

Personal information
- Date of birth: 23 January 1999 (age 27)
- Place of birth: Leizhou, Guangdong, China
- Height: 1.75 m (5 ft 9 in)
- Position: Midfielder

Team information
- Current team: Wuxi Wugo
- Number: 38

Youth career
- 2014–2020: Guangzhou Evergrande

Senior career*
Years	Team	Apps	(Gls)
2020–2024	Meizhou Hakka	61	(8)
2023	→ Guangzhou FC (loan)	6	(0)
2024	→ Ganzhou Ruishi (loan)	23	(2)
2025–2026	Foshan Nanshi	22	(0)
2026–	Wuxi Wugo	0	(0)

International career^{‡}
2017–2019	China U19	5	(2)
2022–2023	China U22	3	(0)
2022–	China	3	(0)
Medal record
Representing China
Men's football
EAFF Championship
Bronze medal – third place	2022 Japan	Team
- * Club domestic league appearances and goals as of 31 December 2022 ‡ National team caps and goals as of 27 July 2022

Chen Guokang (simplified Chinese: 陈国抗; traditional Chinese: 陳國抗; pinyin: Chén Guókàng; born 23 January 1999) is a Chinese professional footballer currently playing as a midfielder for China League One club Wuxi Wugo.

== Club career ==
Chen Guokang joined the Guangzhou Evergrande youth team in 2014 as a midfielder, before being selected for Chinese youth teams, where he was shifted into a full-back. On 20 April 2020, Chen joined second tier football club Meizhou Hakka. He would make his debut on 13 September 2020 in a league game against Liaoning Shenyang Urban in a 2-0 victory, where the Head coach Marcelo Rospide pushed Chen back into midfield. Playing as an attacking midfielder, Chen would soon go on to score his first goal against Jiangxi Liansheng on 20 September 2020 in a league game that ended in a 4-0 victory. The following season would see Chen go on to establish himself as a vital member of the team that gained promotion to the top tier after coming second within the division at the end of the 2021 China League One campaign.

On 15 July 2026, Chen transferred to China League One club Wuxi Wugo.

== International career ==
On 20 July 2022, Chen made his international debut in a 3-0 defeat against South Korea in the 2022 EAFF E-1 Football Championship, as the Chinese FA decided to field the U-23 national team for this senior competition.

== Career statistics ==
As of match played 31 December 2025.

Appearances and goals by club, season and competition
Club	Season	League			National Cup		Continental		Other		Total	
Club	Season	Division	Apps	Goals	Apps	Goals	Apps	Goals	Apps	Goals	Apps	Goals
Meizhou Hakka	2020	China League One	15	2	1	0	–		–		16	2
Meizhou Hakka	2021	China League One	28	3	1	0	–		–		29	3
Meizhou Hakka	2022	Chinese Super League	18	3	2	0	–		–		20	3
Meizhou Hakka	2023	Chinese Super League	5	0	2	0	–		–		7	0
Meizhou Hakka	Total		66	8	6	0	0	0	0	0	72	8
Guangzhou FC (loan)	2023	China League One	6	0	–		–		–		6	0
Ganzhou Ruishi (loan)	2024	China League Two	23	2	3	0	–		–		26	2
Foshan Nanshi	2025	China League One	22	0	1	0	–		–		23	0
Career total			117	10	10	0	0	0	0	0	127	10
