= Shao Renzhe =

Chinese association football player

Personal information
- Date of birth: 13 April 1999 (age 27)
- Height: 1.81 m (5 ft 11 in)
- Position: Forward

Team information
- Current team: Huzhou Changxing Jintown
- Number: 29

Youth career
- –2019: Zhejiang Professional

Senior career*
Years	Team	Apps	(Gls)
2019–2021	Zhejiang Professional	12	(1)
2019	→ Fujian Tianxin (loan)	18	(0)
2022	Nanjing City	0	(0)
2022–2023	Fuzhou Hengxing		
2023–2024	Hangzhou Qiantang		
2024	Guangzhou Dandelion		
2025	Shenzhen Jixiang		
2025–2026	Hangzhou Linping Wuyue	5	(0)
2026–	Huzhou Changxing Jintown	0	(0)
- * Club domestic league appearances and goals as of 12:26, 19 March 2026 (UTC)

Shao Renzhe (Chinese: 邵仁哲; born 13 April 1999) is a Chinese footballer currently playing as a forward for Huzhou Changxing Jintown.

== Club career ==
Shao Renzhe would play for the Zhejiang youth team before being promoted to the senior team. He would soon be loaned out to third club Fujian Tianxin on 2 March 2019. On his return he would make his debut for Zhejiang in the 2020 Chinese FA Cup on 29 November 2020 against Shandong Luneng Taishan in a 2-0 defeat. He would gradually start to establish himself as a regular within the team as the club gained promotion to the top tier at the end of the 2021 campaign. On 30 April 2022, Shao would transfer to second tier club Nanjing City.

== Career statistics ==
As of 25 July 2021.

Club	Season	League			Cup		Continental		Other		Total	
Club	Season	Division	Apps	Goals	Apps	Goals	Apps	Goals	Apps	Goals	Apps	Goals
Zhejiang Professional	2019	China League One	0	0	0	0	–		–		0	0
Zhejiang Professional	2020	China League One	0	0	1	0	–		0 (Note: Appearance(s) in CSL Relegation play-offs)	0	1	0
Zhejiang Professional	2021	China League One	12	1	2	0	–		0	0	14	1
Zhejiang Professional	Total		12	1	3	0	0	0	0	0	15	1
Fujian Tianxin (loan)	2019	China League Two	19	0	0	0	–		2 (Note: Appearances in the China League Two playoffs)	0	21	0
Nanjing City	2022	China League One	0	0	0	0	–		–		0	0
Career total			31	1	3	0	0	0	2	0	36	1
