= Wang Qi (footballer, born October 1993) =

Chinese association football player

Personal information
- Date of birth: 17 October 1993 (age 33)
- Place of birth: Chengdu, Sichuan, China
- Height: 1.70 m (5 ft 7 in)
- Position: Midfielder

Team information
- Current team: Shenzhen Peng City
- Number: 17

Youth career
- –2012: Sichuan FC
- 2013: Tianjin TEDA
- 2014: Sichuan Leaders

Senior career*
Years	Team	Apps	(Gls)
2016–2020	Sichuan Longfor	55	(2)
2020	Sichuan Huakun		
2020–	Shenzhen Peng City	17	(2)
- * Club domestic league appearances and goals as of 14:01, 26 July 2021 (UTC)

Wang Qi (Chinese: 王琪; born 17 October 1993) is a Chinese footballer playing as a midfielder for Shenzhen Peng City.

== Career statistics ==
=== Club ===
As of 26 July 2021.

Club	Season	League			Cup		Continental		Other		Total	
Club	Season	Division	Apps	Goals	Apps	Goals	Apps	Goals	Apps	Goals	Apps	Goals
Sichuan Longfor	2016	China League Two	6	0	0	0	–		1 (Note: Appearances in the China League Two playoffs)	0	7	0
Sichuan Longfor	2017	China League Two	12	0	1 (Note: Appearances in the Chinese FA Cup)	0	–		2	0	15	0
Sichuan Longfor	2018	China League Two	24	2	3	0	–		1	0	28	2
Sichuan Longfor	2019	China League One	13	0	1	0	–		2	1	16	1
Sichuan Longfor	Total		55	2	5	0	0	0	6	1	66	3
Sichuan Jiuniu	2020	China League One	5	1	0	0	–		0	0	5	1
Sichuan Jiuniu	2021	China League One	12	1	0	0	–		0	0	12	1
Sichuan Jiuniu	Total		17	2	0	0	0	0	0	0	17	2
Career total			72	4	5	0	0	0	6	1	83	5
