= Wang Yang (footballer, born 1993) =

Chinese footballer

Wang Yang (Chen Xiaohan) 王瑒 (陈晓寒)
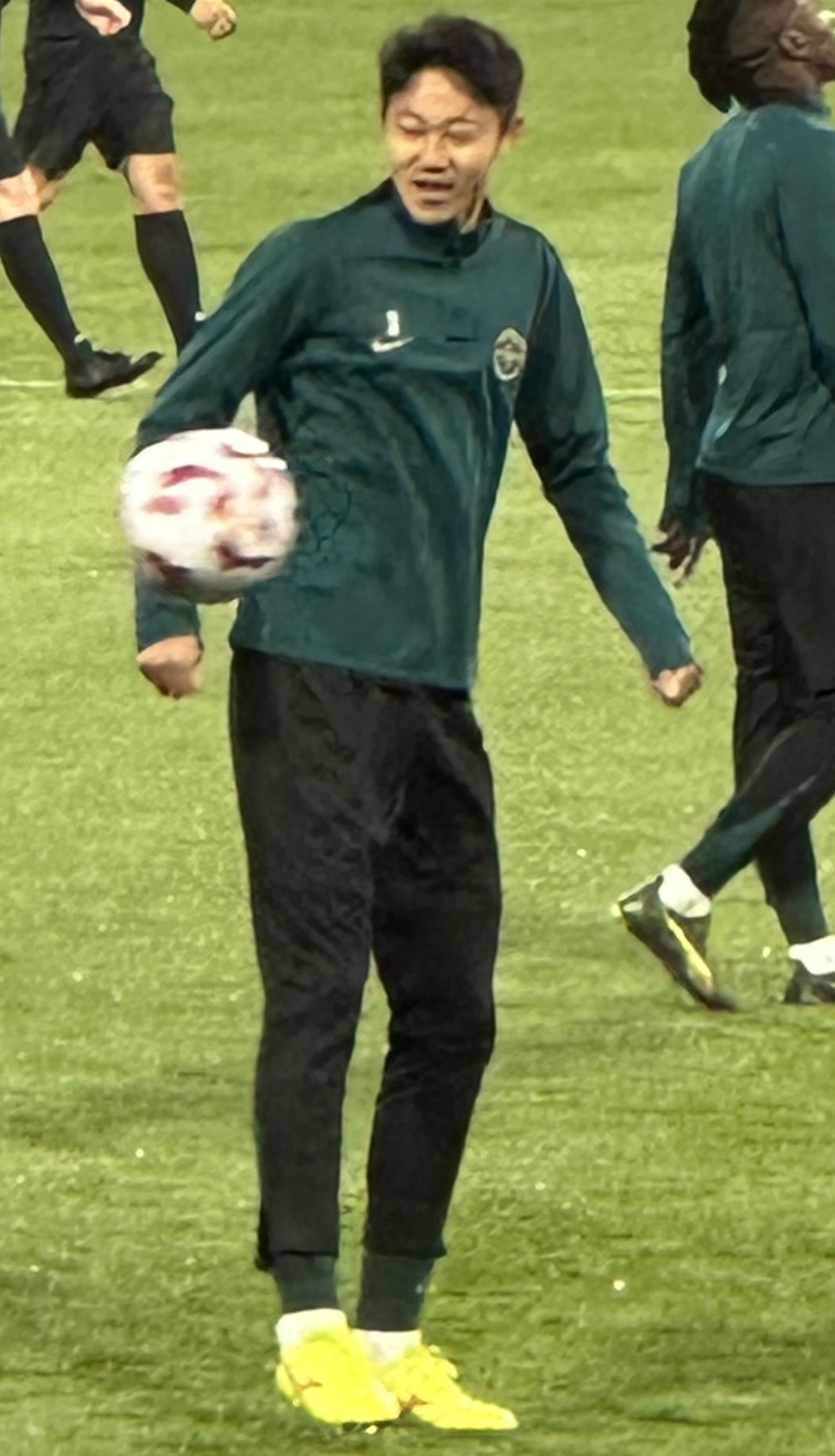
- Wang Yang in April 2025

Personal information
- Full name: Wang Yang
- Date of birth: 23 January 1993 (age 33)
- Place of birth: Baoding, Hebei, China
- Height: 1.87 m (6 ft 1 1/2 in)
- Position: Defender

Team information
- Current team: Zhejiang FC
- Number: 3

Youth career
- Hangzhou Greentown

Senior career*
Years	Team	Apps	(Gls)
2014–	Zhejiang FC	135	(6)
2015	→ Baotou Nanjiao (loan)	13	(0)
- * Club domestic league appearances and goals as of 19 November 2026

Wang Yang (Chinese: 王瑒; born 23 January 1993), former name Chen Xiaohan (Chinese: 陈晓寒), is a Chinese footballer who plays as a defender for Zhejiang FC.

== Club career ==
In 2014, Wang Yang (Chen Xiaohan) started his professional footballer career with Hangzhou Greentown in the Chinese Super League. On 2 November 2014, Wang made his debut for Hangzhou Greentown in the 2014 Chinese Super League against Changchun Yatai, coming on as a substitute for Zang Yifeng in the 90th minute. In March 2015, Wang was loaned to China League Two side Baotou Nanjiao until 31 December 2015. On his return to his parent club now renamed Zhejiang Professional, he start to establish himself as a regular within the team as the club gained promotion to the top tier at the end of the 2021 campaign.

== Career statistics ==
As of match played 31 December 2025

Appearances and goals by club, season and competition
Club	Season	League			National Cup		Continental		Other		Total	
Club	Season	Division	Apps	Goals	Apps	Goals	Apps	Goals	Apps	Goals	Apps	Goals
Hangzhou Greentown/ Zhejiang Greentown/ Zhejiang FC	2014	Chinese Super League	1	0	0	0	-		-		1	0
Hangzhou Greentown/ Zhejiang Greentown/ Zhejiang FC	2016	Chinese Super League	1	0	2	0	-		-		3	0
Hangzhou Greentown/ Zhejiang Greentown/ Zhejiang FC	2017	China League One	7	0	2	0	-		-		9	0
Hangzhou Greentown/ Zhejiang Greentown/ Zhejiang FC	2018	China League One	29	2	0	0	-		-		29	0
Hangzhou Greentown/ Zhejiang Greentown/ Zhejiang FC	2019	China League One	27	1	0	0	-		-		27	1
Hangzhou Greentown/ Zhejiang Greentown/ Zhejiang FC	2020	China League One	7	0	1	0	-		0 (Note: Appearances in Promotion/Relegation Play-offs)	0	8	0
Hangzhou Greentown/ Zhejiang Greentown/ Zhejiang FC	2021	China League One	25	2	0	0	-		2	0	27	0
Hangzhou Greentown/ Zhejiang Greentown/ Zhejiang FC	2022	Chinese Super League	9	0	1	0	-		-		10	0
Hangzhou Greentown/ Zhejiang Greentown/ Zhejiang FC	2023	Chinese Super League	9	0	2	0	4	0	-		15	0
Hangzhou Greentown/ Zhejiang Greentown/ Zhejiang FC	2024	Chinese Super League	10	1	1	0	5	0	-		16	1
Hangzhou Greentown/ Zhejiang Greentown/ Zhejiang FC	2025	Chinese Super League	4	0	1	0	-		-		5	0
Hangzhou Greentown/ Zhejiang Greentown/ Zhejiang FC	Total		129	6	10	0	9	0	2	0	150	6
Baotou Nanjiao (loan)	2015	China League Two	13	0	2	0	-		-		15	0
Career total			142	6	12	0	9	0	2	0	165	6
