= Zhou Pinxi =

Chinese footballer

Personal information
- Date of birth: 23 April 2001 (age 25)
- Place of birth: Kunming, Yunnan, China
- Height: 1.78 m (5 ft 10 in)
- Positions: Midfielder; left-back

Team information
- Current team: Wuxi Wugo
- Number: 16

Youth career
- –2020: Guangzhou Evergrande

Senior career*
Years	Team	Apps	(Gls)
2020–2022	Guangzhou FC	0	(0)
2020	→ Inner Mongolia Caoshangfei (loan)	7	(1)
2022	→ Jiangxi Dark Horse Junior (loan)	15	(0)
2023	Jiangxi Dark Horse Junior	18	(0)
2024–2025	Jiangxi Dingnan United	34	(1)
2026–	Wuxi Wugo	0	(0)
- * Club domestic league appearances and goals as of 14:01, 6 May 2024 (UTC)

Zhou Pinxi (Chinese: 周品希; born 23 April 2001) is a Chinese footballer who plays as a midfielder or left-back for Wuxi Wugo.

== Club career ==
Zhou Pinxi played for the Guangzhou Evergrande youth team before being sent on loan to third-tier club Inner Mongolia Caoshangfei for the 2020 China League Two campaign. On his return to Guangzhou he made his debut for the club on 3 July 2021 in an AFC Champions League game against Kitchee in a 1–0 defeat. This was to be his only appearance for the club before being loaned out again, this time to third-tier club Jiangxi Dark Horse Junior. After his loan period ended he made his move permanent on 18 April 2023.

On 26 February 2024, Zhou signed for second-tier club Heilongjiang Ice City. He made his debut for the club in a league game on 9 March 2024 against his former club Guangzhou, in a 1–0 victory. This was followed by his first goal for the team in a league game against Chongqing Tonglianglong in a 1–1 draw.

== Career statistics ==
As of 6 May 2024.

Club	Season	League			Cup		Continental		Other		Total	
Club	Season	Division	Apps	Goals	Apps	Goals	Apps	Goals	Apps	Goals	Apps	Goals
Guangzhou FC	2020	Chinese Super League	0	0	0	0	0	0	–		0	0
Guangzhou FC	2021	Chinese Super League	0	0	0	0	1 (Note: Appearances in the AFC Champions League)	0	–		1	0
Guangzhou FC	Total		0	0	0	0	1	0	0	0	1	0
Inner Mongolia Caoshangfei (loan)	2020	China League Two	7	1	0	0	–		–		7	1
Jiangxi Dark Horse Junior (loan)	2022	China League Two	15	0	–		–		–		15	0
Jiangxi Dark Horse Junior	2023	China League Two	18	0	1	0	–		–		19	0
Heilongjiang Ice City	2024	China League One	8	1	0	0	–		–		8	1
Career total			48	2	1	0	1	0	0	0	50	2
