= Abdulla Abduwal =

Chinese association football player

Personal information
- Date of birth: 8 September 1999 (age 27)
- Place of birth: Kashgar, Xinjiang, China
- Height: 1.78 m (5 ft 10 in)
- Position: Forward

Team information
- Current team: Xinjiang Tianshan Leopard
- Number: 7

Senior career*
Years	Team	Apps	(Gls)
2020–2023	Xinjiang Tianshan Leopard	18	(2)
- * Club domestic league appearances and goals as of 14:01, 9 August 2021 (UTC)

Abdulla Abduwal (Chinese: 阿卜杜拉·阿卜杜外力; born 8 September 1999) is a Chinese footballer most recently as a forward for Xinjiang Tianshan Leopard.

== Career statistics ==
=== Club ===
As of 9 August 2021.

Club	Season	League			Cup		Other		Total	
Club	Season	Division	Apps	Goals	Apps	Goals	Apps	Goals	Apps	Goals
Xinjiang Tianshan Leopard	2020	China League One	11	2	0	0	0	0	11	2
Xinjiang Tianshan Leopard	2021	China League One	7	0	0	0	0	0	7	0
Career total			18	2	0	0	0	0	18	2
