= Wu Yufan =

Chinese association football player

Personal information
- Date of birth: 3 November 1994 (age 32)
- Place of birth: Fujian, Xiamen
- Height: 1.83 m (6 ft 0 in)
- Position: Forward

Youth career
- 2016–2017: Hebei China Fortune

Senior career*
Years	Team	Apps	(Gls)
2017	Qingdao Jonoon	11	(3)
2018–2020	Suzhou Dongwu	56	(20)
2020–2022	Kunshan FC	35	(3)
2023	Shanghai Jiading Huilong	20	(0)
2024	Langfang Glory City	22	(2)
- * Club domestic league appearances and goals as of 14:01, 25 December 2022 (UTC)

Wu Yufan (Chinese: 吴宇帆; born 3 November 1994) is a Chinese footballer who plays as a forward.

== Club career ==
Wu Yufan would play for the Hebei China Fortune reserve team before leaving to join third tier club Qingdao Jonoon in the 2017 China League Two campaign. After a season he moved to third tier club Suzhou Dongwu on 9 March 2018 and was part of the team that gained promotion to the second tier at the end of the 2019 China League Two campaign. On 22 July 2020 he would join second tier club Kunshan. He would go on to establish himself as regular within the team and was part of the squad that won the division and promotion to the top tier at the end of the 2022 China League One campaign.

== Career statistics ==
As of 25 December 2022.

Club	Season	League			Cup		Continental		Other		Total	
Club	Season	Division	Apps	Goals	Apps	Goals	Apps	Goals	Apps	Goals	Apps	Goals
Qingdao Jonoon	2017	China League Two	11	3	0	0	-		-		11	3
Suzhou Dongwu	2018	China League Two	23	7	3	2	-		-		26	9
Suzhou Dongwu	2019	China League Two	33	13	1	0	-		-		34	13
Suzhou Dongwu	Total		56	20	4	2	0	0	0	0	60	22
Kunshan FC	2020	China League One	11	2	2	0	-		-		13	2
Kunshan FC	2021	China League One	21	1	1	0	-		-		22	0
Kunshan FC	2022	China League One	3	0	2	1	-		-		5	1
Kunshan FC	Total		35	3	5	1	0	0	0	0	40	4
Career total			102	25	6	2	0	0	0	0	108	27

== Honours ==
=== Club ===
Kunshan FC

- China League One: 2022
