= Chen Pu =

Chinese footballer (born 1997)

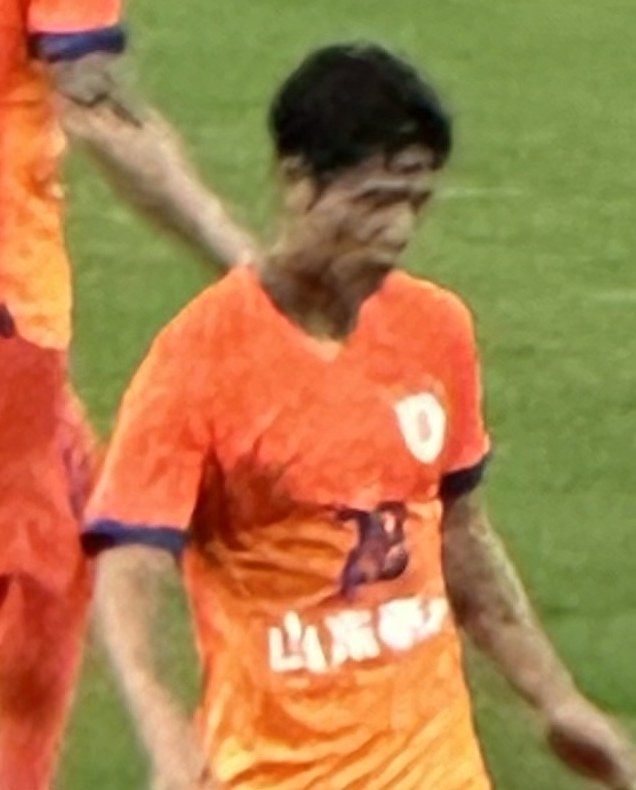
- Chen Pu in August 2024

Personal information
- Date of birth: 15 January 1997 (age 29)
- Place of birth: Chongqing, Sichuan, China
- Height: 1.77 m (5 ft 10 in)
- Position: Left winger

Team information
- Current team: Shandong Taishan
- Number: 29

Youth career
- –2018: Shandong Luneng
- 2015: → Desportivo Brasil (loan)

Senior career*
Years	Team	Apps	(Gls)
2018–2019	→ Desportivo Brasil (loan)	0	(0)
2019–	Shandong Taishan	121	(18)
2020	→ Shijiazhuang Ever Bright (loan)	13	(2)
2021	→ Henan Songshan Longmen (loan)	20	(2)

International career^{‡}
2017	China U19	1	(0)
2020	China U23	2	(0)
2023–	China	11	(0)
- * Club domestic league appearances and goals as of 19 November 2026 ‡ National team caps and goals as of 26 November 2023

Chen Pu (simplified Chinese: 陈蒲; traditional Chinese: 陳蒲; pinyin: Chén Pú; born 15 January 1997) is a Chinese professional footballer currently playing as a left winger for Chinese Super League club Shandong Taishan and the China national team.

== Club career ==
Chen Pu would play for the Shandong Luneng youth team (now renamed Shandong Taishan F.C.) and was sent on loan to Brazilian football club Desportivo Brasil to continue his football development. At Desportivo Brasil he would make his senior debut in a Copa Paulista game on 25 August 2018 against Red Bull Brasil in a match that ended in a 2–2 draw. When he returned to China with Shandong he was promoted to their senior team and he would make his debut for the club on 10 August 2019 in a league game against Hebei China Fortune F.C. in a 3–0 victory.

Chen was loaned out to fellow Chinese Super League clubs Shijiazhuang Ever Bright and Henan Songshan Longmen for the 2020 and 2021 season respectively. He returned to Shandong's first team for the 2022 season, scoring his first goal for the club on 6 July 2022, a 87-minute late winner in a 2–1 win against Changchun Yatai. On 15 January 2023, Chen scored the equalizer against Zhejiang Pro in the 2022 Chinese FA Cup final, and Shandong came from behind to win the game 2–1. It was the first major trophy in Chen's career and Shandong achieved an unprecedented 3 successive titles in this competition.

== International career ==
On 23 March 2023, Chen made his international debut for China in a 0–0 away draw against New Zealand.

On 12 December 2023, Chen was named in China's squad for the 2023 AFC Asian Cup in Qatar.

== Career statistics ==
As of match played 31 December 2025.

Club	Season	League			State League		Cup		Continental		Other		Total	
Club	Season	Division	Apps	Goals	Apps	Goals	Apps	Goals	Apps	Goals	Apps	Goals	Apps	Goals
Desportivo Brasil (loan)	2018	–			0	0	0	0	–		6 (Note: Appearances in the Copa Paulista)	0	6	0
Desportivo Brasil (loan)	2019	–			6 (Note: Appearances in the Campeonato Paulista Série A3)	0	0	0	–		0	0	6	0
Desportivo Brasil (loan)	Total		0	0	6	0	0	0	0	0	6	0	12	0
Shandong Luneng/ Shandong Taishan	2019	Chinese Super League	1	0	–		0	0	0	0	–		1	0
Shandong Luneng/ Shandong Taishan	2022	Chinese Super League	28	8	–		5	2	0	0	–		33	10
Shandong Luneng/ Shandong Taishan	2023	Chinese Super League	28	5	–		4	2	5	0	1 (Note: Appearances in Chinese FA Super Cup)	0	38	7
Shandong Luneng/ Shandong Taishan	2024	Chinese Super League	24	2	–		3	2	8	2	–		35	6
Shandong Luneng/ Shandong Taishan	2025	Chinese Super League	16	1	–		2	1	1	0	–		19	2
Shandong Luneng/ Shandong Taishan	Total		97	16	0	0	14	7	14	2	1	0	126	25
Shijiazhuang Ever Bright (loan)	2020	Chinese Super League	13	2	–		1	0	–		–		14	2
Henan Songshan Longmen (loan)	2021	Chinese Super League	20	2	–		4	0	–		–		24	2
Career total			130	20	6	0	19	7	14	2	7	0	176	29

== Honours ==
Shandong Taishan

- Chinese FA Cup: 2022
