= Liu Yuhao =

Chinese footballer (born 1994)

Liu Yuhao 刘宇豪
Personal information
- Date of birth: 14 May 1994 (age 32)
- Place of birth: Benxi, Liaoning, China
- Height: 1.84 m (6 ft 0 in)
- Position: Forward

Youth career
- Changchun Yatai

Senior career*
Years	Team	Apps	(Gls)
2013–2015	Mafra	6	(0)
2014	→ Vila F. Rosário (loan)	8	(0)
2015–2016	Loures	4	(0)
2016	→ Eléctrico (loan)	7	(0)
2016–2017	Tourizense	11	(1)
2017–2020	Cova da Piedade	42	(0)
2018	→ Stumbras (loan)	2	(0)
2021–2022	Kunshan FC	39	(10)
2023–2024	Yunnan Yukun	39	(10)
- * Club domestic league appearances and goals as of 26 December 2022

Liu Yuhao (Chinese: 刘宇豪; pinyin: Liú Yǔháo; born 14 May 1994) is a Chinese retired footballer who played as a forward.

== Career ==
Liu Yuhao would move abroad to Portugal where he joined third tier club Mafra before being loaned out to Vila F. Rosário. After playing for Loures, Eléctrico and Tourizense in the third tier, second tier LigaPro side Cova da Piedade took him into the club on 1 February 2017. Although he initially failed to establish himself with the first team due to injury, his contract was renewed with the club in July 2017. After this, on 23 July 2017 he made his debut for the club in the first round of 2017–18 Taça da Liga which Cova da Piedade beat Nacional 3–2. He made his LigaPro debut on 6 August 2017 in a 2–1 home defeat against Santa Clara, coming on as a substitute for Robson in the 77th minute.

On 3 July 2018, Liu was loaned to Lithuanian A Lyga side Stumbras for the rest of the season. He made his debut for Stumbras on the same day in a 2–0 home win against Palanga. On 13 July 2018, Liu played 33 minutes at Stumbras's UEFA Europa League debut in the first qualifying round of 2018–19 UEFA Europa League against Apollon Limassol.

On 29 July 2021, Liu would return to China to join second tier second tier club Kunshan FC on a free transfer. He would make his debut in a league game on 1 August 2021 against Xinjiang Tianshan Leopard in a 1-0 victory. This would be followed by his first goal for the club in a league game on 16 August 2021 against Suzhou Dongwu in a 4–1 victory. He would go on to establish himself as regular within the team that won the division and promotion to the top tier at the end of the 2022 China League One campaign.

== Career statistics ==
As of 26 December 2022

Appearances and goals by club, season and competition
Club	Season	League			National cup		League cup		Continental		Total	
Club	Season	Division	Apps	Goals	Apps	Goals	Apps	Goals	Apps	Goals	Apps	Goals
Vila F. Rosário (Loan)	2013–14	Lisbon FA Pró-National Division	8	0	–		–		–		8	0
Mafra	2014–15	Campeonato de Portugal	6	0	0	0	–		–		6	0
Loures	2015–16	Campeonato de Portugal	4	0	1	0	–		–		5	0
Eléctrico (loan)	2015–16	Campeonato de Portugal	7	0	0	0	–		–		7	0
Tourizense	2016–17	Campeonato de Portugal	11	1	1	0	–		–		12	1
Cova da Piedade	2016–17	LigaPro	0	0	0	0	0	0	–		0	0
Cova da Piedade	2017–18	LigaPro	23	0	1	0	1	0	–		25	0
Cova da Piedade	2018–19	LigaPro	11	0	3	0	0	0	–		14	0
Cova da Piedade	2019–20	LigaPro	8	0	1	0	0	0	–		9	0
Cova da Piedade	Total		42	0	5	0	1	0	0	0	48	0
Stumbras (Loan)	2018	A Lyga	2	0	0	0	0	0	2	0	4	0
Kunshan FC	2021	China League One	19	5	2	1	–		–		21	6
Kunshan FC	2022	China League One	20	5	2	0	–		–		22	5
Kunshan FC	Total		39	10	4	1	0	0	0	0	43	11
Career total			119	11	11	1	1	0	2	0	133	12

== Honours ==
Mafra

- Campeonato de Portugal: 2014–15

Kunshan FC

- China League One: 2022
