= 2018 Chinese FA Cup =

2018 The Chinese Football Association Cup
CFA Cup

Tournament details
- Country: China
- Dates: 11 November 2017–30 November 2018
- Teams: 64

Final positions
- Champions: Beijing Sinobo Guoan (4th title)
- Runners-up: Shandong Luneng Taishan
- AFC Champions League: Beijing Sinobo Guoan

Tournament statistics
- Matches played: 78
- Goals scored: 210 (2.69 per match)
- Top goal scorer: (Spain) Jonathan Viera (5 goals)

Awards
- Best player: (China) Zhang Xizhe

Yanjing Beer 2018 Chinese FA Cup (Chinese: 燕京啤酒2018中国足球协会杯) was the 20th edition of the Chinese FA Cup. On 29 December 2017, Yanjing Beer extended their sponsorship contract for another four years (2018–2021).

== Schedule ==
The schedule was as follows.

Round	Dates	Clubs remaining	Clubs involved	Winners from previous round	New entries this round	New Entries Notes
Preliminary round	11–18 November 2017	92	16	none	16	
Qualifying round	30 December 2017 – 7 January 2018	84	24	8	16	
First round	17–18 March	72	16	8	8	last 8 teams from the 2018 China League Two and last 8 teams from the qualifying round
Second round	24–25 March	64	32	8	24	top 20 teams from the 2018 China League Two and top 4 teams from the qualifying round
Third round	10–12 April	48	32	16	16	16 2018 China League One teams
Fourth Round	24–25 April	32	32	16	16	16 2018 Chinese Super League teams
Fifth Round	1–2 May	16	16	16	none	
Quarter-finals	First leg 9 June and 7–8 July; Second leg 24–25 July	8	8	8	none	
Semi-finals	First leg 21–23 August; Second leg 25–27 September	4	4	4	none	
Final	First leg 24–25 November; Second leg 1–2 December	2	2	2	none	

== Home Advantage Decision ==
According to Chinese FA Cup Procedure, in each round, home team advantages are decided as follows.

Rounds	Rules
First round	According to FA Cup draw.
Second round	According to FA Cup draw.
Third round	The team in lower tier in 2018 season decides whether they play at home.
Fourth round	The team in lower tier in 2018 season decides whether they play at home.
Fifth round	Teams in different tiers: The team in lower tier in 2018 season decides whether they play at home. Teams in the same tier: The team ranked higher in 2017 season decides whether they play at home.
Quarter-finals	Teams in different tiers: The team in higher tier in 2018 season will hold the 1st leg and the other team hold the 2nd leg. Teams in the same tier: The team ranked lower in 2017 season will hold the 1st leg and the other team hold the 2nd leg.
Semi-finals	Teams in different tiers: The team in higher tier in 2018 season will hold the 1st leg and the other team hold the 2nd leg. Teams in the same tier: The team ranked lower in 2017 season will hold the 1st leg and the other team hold the 2nd leg.
Final	Teams in different tiers: The team in higher tier in 2018 season will hold the 1st leg and the other team hold the 2nd leg. Teams in the same tier: The team ranked lower in 2017 season will hold the 1st leg and the other team hold the 2nd leg.

== Qualifying rounds ==
=== Association ranking ===
For the 2018 Chinese FA Cup preliminary round, the local football associations are allocated places according to the total number of FA Cup matches of all amateur clubs associated to local FAs from 2011 to 2016. Shanghai Jiading Boji, who advanced to the third round of 2017 Chinese FA Cup, and the champions and the runners-up of 2017 "I Love Football" Chinese Football Nongovernmental Championships would join the qualifying round directly.

Rank	Association	Points	Teams
1	Dalian FA	12	3
2	Guangdong FA	10	3
3	Qingdao FA	8	2
3	Jiangsu FA	8	2
3	Zhejiang FA	8	2
6	Wuhan FA	6	2
7	Shenyang FA	5	2
7	Shandong FA	5	2
7	Shanghai FA	5	2
10	Guangxi FA	3	2
11	Changchun FA	2	2

Rank	Association	Points	Teams
11	Shanxi FA	2	2
11	Nanjing FA	2	2
14	Hebei FA	1	2
14	Henan FA	1	2
14	Nei Mongol FA	1	2
14	Xi'an FA	1	2
14	Hubei FA	1	2
19	Heilongjiang FA	0	1
19	Jilin FA	0	1
19	Liaoning FA	0	1
19	Yanbian FA	0	1

Rank	Association	Points	Teams
19	Beijing FA	0	1
19	Tianjin FA	0	1
19	Gansu FA	0	1
19	Ningxia FA	0	1
19	Qinghai FA	0	1
19	Shaanxi FA	0	1
19	Xinjiang FA	0	1
19	Chengdu FA	0	1
19	Guangzhou FA	0	1
19	Hunan FA	0	1
19	Shenzhen FA	0	1

Rank	Association	Points	Teams
19	Hainan FA	0	1
19	Anhui FA	0	1
19	Jiangxi FA	0	1
19	Fujian FA	0	1
19	Xiamen FA	0	1
19	Chongqing FA	0	1
19	Guizhou FA	0	1
19	Yunnan FA	0	1
19	Sichuan FA	0	1
19	Tibet FA	0	1
19	Kunming FA	0	1

=== Preliminary round ===
29 teams registered to participate in the qualifying rounds of the 2018 Chinese FA Cup. Teams ranked 9–13 in the north group and Teams ranked 6–17 in the south group participated in this round.

==== North Group ====
11 November 2017	Baotou Fanmeng (A)	5–0	Yuncheng Old Fellows (A)	Baotou Olympic Sports Centre Stadium, Baotou
15:00

12 November 2017	Qingdao Kunpeng (A)	4–0	Chifeng Hongshan Shire (A)	Qingdao Tiantai Stadium, Qingdao
14:30

==== South Group ====
11 November 2017	Ningbo Yinbo (A)	2–0	Nanjing Genimous 1Fusion (A)	Ningbo Fubang Stadium, Ningbo
14:00

11 November 2017	Hunan Sports Lottery (A)	5–3	Guiyang Hongrun (A)	Changsha Yanghu Wetland Soccer Park, Changsha
15:00

12 November 2017	Nanjing Shaye (A)	5–0	Wuhan Dongfeng Honda (A)	Hohai University Stadium, Nanjing
14:30

12 November 2017	Hainan Dingli Flying Tiger (A)	2–1	Xiamen Nanxun (A)	Wanning Middle School Attached to Beijing Normal University Field, Wanning
15:00

12 November 2017	Chongqing High Wave (A)	2–0	Suzhou Zhongyuan (A)	Chayuan Shengdi Football Park, Chongqing
15:00	Liu Bochao; Wang Guoxi

18 November 2017	Nanchang Teneng (A)	0–2	Guangzhou Haoxin (A)	Nanchang International Sports Center, Nanchang
15:00

=== Qualifying round ===
Teams ranked 1–8 in the north group, teams ranked 1–5 in the south group, 8 preliminary round winners, Shanghai Huajiao and Hangzhou Wuyue Qiantang, the champions and the runners-up of 2017 "I Love Football" Chinese Football Nongovernmental Championships and Shanghai Jiading Boji, who advanced to the third round of 2017 Chinese FA Cup will participate in this round. Hangzhou Wuyue Qiantang, already qualified as top five teams in the south group, left a vacancy which was filled by Nanchang Teneng. Shenyang West Winner, already qualified as top eight teams in the north group, withdrew and replaced by Chifeng Hongshan Shire.

==== Format ====
Format of qualifying round was a variation of Double-elimination tournament with three rounds as follows.

- Round 1: Team 1 VS Team 2; Team 3 VS Team 4
- Round 2: Winners from the Round 1 would compete against each other and the winner would qualify and be ranked the 1st; Losers from the Round 1 would compete against each other and the loser would be eliminated and ranked the 4th.
- Round 3: The remaining two teams would compete against each other and the winner would qualify and be ranked the 2nd while the loser would be eliminated and ranked the 3rd.

==== Group A ====
First round
1	Dalian Tongshun	1(6)
4	Guangzhou Haoxin	1(7)
Winner's bracket
3	Liuzhou Ranko	4
2	Hunan Sports Lottery	3
Dalian Tongshun	2
Hunan Sports Lottery	0
Loser's bracket

Semi-finals
Guangzhou Haoxin (Q)	3
Liuzhou Ranko	1
Liuzhou Ranko	0
Dalian Tongshun (Q)	5

30 December 2017	Dalian Tongshun (A)	1–1 (6–7 p)	Guangzhou Haoxin (A)	Yudong Football Training Base Field 1, Haikou
10:00	Yu Xiang	Report	Li Jiayi 60'	Referee: Ma Yunkun
	Penalties
	He Zehao (penalty scored); Liu Peng (penalty scored); Zhang Zhibin (penalty scored); Zhang Qing (penalty scored); Qi Hang (penalty scored); Yang Dong (penalty scored); Liang Shuai (penalty missed)		(penalty scored) Zhang Yunlong; (penalty scored) Li Qiang; (penalty scored) Chen Junjie; (penalty scored) Li Jiayi; (penalty scored) Zhang Yongrui; (penalty scored) Wei Huiping; (penalty scored) Xu Guanbin

30 December 2017	Liuzhou Ranko (A)	4–3	Hunan Sports Lottery (A)	Yudong Football Training Base Field 1, Haikou
15:00	Wei Xinkuan 6', 33'; Sun Junhao 50'; Xue Yuzhen 59'	Report	Zhu Xiuyuan , 75'; Tang Yuxuan 64'	Referee: Ren Tong

31 December 2017	Dalian Tongshun (A)	2–0	Hunan Sports Lottery (A)	Yudong Football Training Base Field 1, Haikou
10:00	Liu Peng 53'; Liu Xin 64' (o.g.)	Report		Referee: Xu Qiangqiang

31 December 2017	Guangzhou Haoxin (A)	3–1	Liuzhou Ranko (A)	Yudong Football Training Base Field 1, Haikou
15:00	Chen Junjie 4'; Diao Binbin 22'; Li Jiayi 48'	Report	Xue Yuzhen 59'	Referee: Dai Yige

1 January 2018	Dalian Tongshun (A)	5–0	Liuzhou Ranko (A)	Yudong Football Training Base Field 1, Haikou
15:00	Wang Bin 10'; He Zehao 55', 63'; Zhang Zhibin 72'; Liu Xingyong	Report		Referee: Liang Caiwei

==== Group B ====
First round
1	Wuhan Chufeng Heli	4
4	Nanjing Shaye	1
Winner's bracket
3	Shenyang City Public	2
2	Baotou Fanmeng	3
Nanjing Shaye	1
Shenyang City Public	0
Loser's bracket

Semi-finals
Wuhan Chufeng Heli (Q)	5
Baotou Fanmeng	1
Baotou Fanmeng	0
Nanjing Shaye (Q)	5

30 December 2017	Wuhan Chufeng Heli (A)	4–1	Nanjing Shaye (A)	Yudong Football Training Base Field 2, Haikou
10:00	Qi Chongxi 9'; Pan Chi 15'; Zhu Wei 33'; Guo Yuantong 50'	Report	Yu Zengpin 90+1'	Referee: Yan Lifu

30 December 2017	Shenyang City Public (A)	2–3	Baotou Fanmeng (A)	Yudong Football Training Base Field 2, Haikou
15:00	Tao Junfeng 62', 64'	Report	Hu Hengwei 70'; Zhan Keqiang 76' (pen.), 80'	Referee: Liu Chentao

31 December 2017	Nanjing Shaye (A)	1–0	Shenyang City Public (A)	Yudong Football Training Base Field 2, Haikou
10:00	Zhao Zeyu 8'	Report		Referee: Sun Shengyu

31 December 2017	Wuhan Chufeng Heli (A)	5–1	Baotou Fanmeng (A)	Yudong Football Training Base Field 2, Haikou
15:00	Zhang Minjie 12'; Deng Sheng 15'; Guo Yuantong 20'; Qi Chongxi 53'; Li Yi 72'	Report	Pan Hao 70'	Referee: Liu Wei

1 January 2018	Nanjing Shaye (A)	5–0	Baotou Fanmeng (A)	Yudong Football Training Base Field 2, Haikou
15:00	Jiang Peng 39'; Cao Yiwen 54', 69'; Yu Zengpin 66', 75'	Report		Referee: Yang Kaizi

==== Group C ====
First round
1	Changzhou Tianshan	1
4	Nanchang Teneng	0
Winner's bracket
3	Qingdao Elite United	0
2	Ningbo Yinbo	3
Nanchang Teneng	1(3)
Qingdao Elite United	1(1)
Loser's bracket

Semi-finals
Changzhou Tianshan	0
Ningbo Yinbo (Q)	4
Changzhou Tianshan (Q)	5
Nanchang Teneng	0

30 December 2017	Changzhou Tianshan (A)	1–0	Nanchang Teneng (A)	Hainan Sport School Stadium, Haikou
10:00	Xu Rui 21'	Report		Referee: Ma Teng

30 December 2017	Qingdao Elite United (A)	0–3	Ningbo Yinbo (A)	Hainan Sport School Stadium, Haikou
15:00		Report	Wang Xinpeng 19' (o.g.); Zeng Yan 69'; Li Yongkui 81'	Referee: Xiao Nan

31 December 2017	Nanchang Teneng (A)	1–1 (3–1 p)	Qingdao Elite United (A)	Hainan Sport School Stadium, Haikou
10:00	Sun Bin 52'	Report	Wang Lei 19' (pen.)	Referee: He Xiaochun
	Penalties
	Cai Enhuai (penalty scored); Yang Weinan (penalty scored); Zou Yaojian (penalty scored)		(penalty scored) Gao Yang; (penalty missed) Wang Xinpeng; (penalty missed) Zhang Peng; (penalty missed) Zhang Baoliang

31 December 2017	Changzhou Tianshan (A)	0–4	Ningbo Yinbo (A)	Hainan Sport School Stadium, Haikou
15:00		Report	Zeng Yan 40', 61'; Song Yiyang 73'; Li Zheng 90'	Referee: Jia Zhiliang

1 January 2018	Nanchang Teneng (A)	0–5	Changzhou Tianshan (A)	Hainan Sport School Stadium, Haikou
15:00		Report	Hu Mingpeng 5'; Zhu Feixiang 43'; Xu Junjie 45+1' (pen.); Xu Rui 47', 86'	Referee: Qiu Zhaojun

==== Group D ====
First round
1	Hubei Huachuang	0(3)
4	Chongqing High Wave	0(0)
Winner's bracket
3	Dalianwan Qianguan	1(5)
2	Qingdao Kunpeng	1(3)
Chongqing High Wave	4
Qingdao Kunpeng	5
Loser's bracket

Semi-finals
Hubei Huachuang	0
Dalianwan Qianguan (Q)	2
Hubei Huachuang	1
Qingdao Kunpeng (Q)	2

5 January 2018	Hubei Huachuang (A)	0–0 (3–0 p)	Chongqing High Wave (A)	Yudong Football Training Base Field 1, Haikou
10:00		Report		Referee: Peng Bo
	Penalties
	Chen Lulong (penalty scored); Liu Jie (penalty scored); An Bing (penalty scored)		(penalty missed) Zhang Xin; (penalty missed) Gao Zhijun; (penalty missed) Li Mingxing

5 January 2018	Dalianwan Qianguan (A)	1–1 (5–3 p)	Qingdao Kunpeng (A)	Yudong Football Training Base Field 1, Haikou
15:00	Li Jisheng 62'	Report	Ma Lin 33'	Referee: Niu Minghui

6 January 2018	Chongqing High Wave (A)	4–5	Qingdao Kunpeng (A)	Yudong Football Training Base Field 1, Haikou
10:00				Referee: Zhang Xiaochen

6 January 2018	Hubei Huachuang (A)	0–2	Dalianwan Qianguan (A)	Yudong Football Training Base Field 1, Haikou
15:00			Jia Chao 9'; Zang Yongji 80'	Referee: Huang Yi

7 January 2018	Qingdao Kunpeng (A)	2–1	Hubei Huachuang (A)	Yudong Football Training Base Field 1, Haikou
15:00	Sun Kai 67', 83'	Report	Chen Lulong 33'	Referee: Ding Chao

==== Group E ====
First round
1	Hainan Dingli Flying Tiger	3(4)
4	Chifeng Hongshan Shire	3(3)
Winner's bracket
3	Shanghai Jiading Boji	9
2	Changzhi Popeye	2
Chifeng Hongshan Shire	4
Changzhi Popeye	0
Loser's bracket

Semi-finals
Hainan Dingli Flying Tiger	1
Shanghai Jiading Boji (Q)	6
Hainan Dingli Flying Tiger	0
Chifeng Hongshan Shire (Q)	1

5 January 2018	Hainan Dingli Flying Tiger (A)	3–3 (4–3 p)	Chifeng Hongshan Shire (A)	Yudong Football Training Base Field 2, Haikou
10:00	Li Tianyu 21', 65'; Wang Cunde 82'	Report	Bai Fan 16'; Leng Bing 77'; Xia Wenshuai 85'	Referee: Su Zihao
	Penalties
	Yang Tishan (penalty missed); Wang Cunde (penalty scored); Yang Zuliang (penalty scored) (penalty scored) (penalty scored)		(penalty missed) Liu Peng; (penalty scored) Wang Ruijie; (penalty scored) Leng Bing; (penalty scored) Zhou Guoqing; (penalty missed) Gao Yong

5 January 2018	Shanghai Jiading Boji (A)	9–2	Changzhi Popeye (A)	Yudong Football Training Base Field 2, Haikou
15:00	Wang Zi 10', 16', 20' (pen.); Xu Bin 21', 31', 42'; He Yuqing 39'; Sun Yue 53'; Xi Sunbin 59'	Report	Ji Chenguang 14'; Li Menglong 61'	Referee: Ning Zhaobing

6 January 2018	Chifeng Hongshan Shire (A)	4–0	Changzhi Popeye (A)	Yudong Football Training Base Field 2, Haikou
10:00	Xu Longbo 31', 76'; Bai Fan 54'; Zhou Jianming 79'			Referee: Wang Wei

6 January 2018	Hainan Dingli Flying Tiger (A)	1–6	Shanghai Jiading Boji (A)	Yudong Football Training Base Field 2, Haikou
15:00	Ye Guodong 41'		Sun Yue 3', 17'; Zheng Bin 62', 89'; Xi Sunbin 82'; Sun Yao 90+4'	Referee: Zhen Wei

7 January 2018	Chifeng Hongshan Shire (A)	1–0	Hainan Dingli Flying Tiger (A)	Yudong Football Training Base Field 2, Haikou
15:00	Bai Fan 17'	Report

==== Group F ====
First round
1	Jinan Dayou	1
4	Dalian Ruiheng	2
Winner's bracket
3	Hangzhou Wuyue Qiantang	2
2	Shanghai Huajiao	1
Jinan Dayou	1
Shanghai Huajiao	0
Loser's bracket

Semi-finals
Dalian Ruiheng	1(2)
Hangzhou Wuyue Qiantang (Q)	1(4)
Dalian Ruiheng	0
Jinan Dayou (Q)	3

5 January 2018	Jinan Dayou (A)	1–2	Dalian Ruiheng (A)	Hainan Sport School Stadium, Haikou
10:00	Wang Guangyu 90+2'	Report	Wang Shuo 11'; Li Peng 23'	Referee: Zhang Chao

5 January 2018	Hangzhou Wuyue Qiantang (A)	2–1	Shanghai Huajiao (A)	Hainan Sport School Stadium, Haikou
15:00	Qin Qiang 45+2'; Deng Tao 68'	Report	Wang Zhewei 35'	Referee: He Xin

6 January 2018	Jinan Dayou (A)	1–0	Shanghai Huajiao (A)	Hainan Sport School Stadium, Haikou
10:00	Tian Xin 27'			Referee: Wu Kai

6 January 2018	Dalian Ruiheng (A)	1–1 (2–4 p)	Hangzhou Wuyue Qiantang (A)	Hainan Sport School Stadium, Haikou
15:00	Liu Zhuang 90+1'		Wang Yongxin 37'	Referee: Wang Wei
	Penalties
	Wang Shuo (penalty scored); Liu Zhiqiang (penalty missed); Liu Zhuang (penalty scored); Li Peng (penalty missed)		(penalty scored) Wang Fei; (penalty scored) Bao Wei; (penalty scored) Du Shaobin; (penalty missed) Wang Yongxin; (penalty scored) Zhang Xian

7 January 2018	Jinan Dayou (A)	3–0	Dalian Ruiheng (A)	Hainan Sport School Stadium, Haikou
15:00	Tian Xin 8'; Wang Guangyu 25'; Yu Fei 63'	Report

== First round ==
Shenzhen Pengcheng and Sichuan Jiuniu replaced Qiqihaer Zhongjian Bituminous Concrete and Lhasa Urban Construction Investment who withdrew from 2018 China League Two in the original draw.

17 March 2018	Jinan Dayou (A)	2–3	Yanbian Beiguo (3)	Shandong Provincial Stadium, Jinan
14:30	Xia Shicong 17', 29'		Xu Bo 60', 90'; Song Jian 81'	Referee: Yan Xu

17 March 2018	Qingdao Kunpeng (A)	2–3	Shenyang Dongjin (3)	Qingdao Sino - German Ecopark Football Base, Qingdao
15:00	A Xu 9'; Dong Xiao 32'		Yu Zhen 16', 55'; Xia Deqiang 81'	Referee: Li Pengda

17 March 2018	Anhui Hefei Guiguan (3)	2–1	Hangzhou Wuyue Qiantang (A)	Anqing Sports Centre, Anqing
15:00	Zhang Tianhan 43'; Chen Zewen 54'		Wang Fei 37'	Referee: Ding Chao

17 March 2018	Nanjing Shaye (A)	1–0	Dalianwan Qianguan (A)	Youth Olympic Games Sport Park Stadium, Nanjing
15:00	Yuan Zheng 46'			Attendance: 302; Referee: Han Lei

17 March 2018	Changzhou Tianshan (A)	1–2	Hainan Boying (3)	Changzhou Olympic Sports Centre, Changzhou
19:35	Yu Zhicheng 1'		Liu Haidong 5'; Hu Yangyang 34'	Referee: Bai Bin

18 March 2018	Zhenjiang Huasa (3)	3–1	Chifeng Hongshan Shire (A)	Zhenjiang Sports and Exhibition Center, Zhenjiang
15:00	Guo Ziyin 27', 45'; Luo Jiacheng 69'		Guo Guangsen 62'	Referee: Xiang Yao

18 March 2018	Shenzhen Pengcheng (3)	0–1	Sichuan Jiuniu (3)	Xixiang Sports Center, Shenzhen
15:00			Ruan Jun 70'	Referee: Zhang Lu

18 March 2018	Zibo Sunday (3)	3–0	Dalian Tongshun (A)	Qidu Cultural Sports City, Zibo
15:30	Shen Tong 20'; Feng Yang 48'; Liu Mengyang 54'			Referee: Wu Kai

== Second round ==
Baotou Nanjiao and Fujian Tianxin replaced Chengdu Qbao and Shanghai JuJu Sports who withdrew from 2018 China League Two in the original draw.

24 March 2018	Wuhan Chufeng Heli (A)	1–0	Zhenjiang Huasa (3)	Tazi Lake Sports Centre, Wuhan
15:00	Huang Lei 79' (pen.)			Referee: Yang Kaizi

24 March 2018	Hunan Billows (3)	2–1	Shenzhen Ledman (3)	Yiyang Stadium, Yiyang
15:00	Zhuang Jiajie 87', 88'		Hu Weiwei 69'	Referee: Liu Xindong

24 March 2018	Nantong Zhiyun (3)	4–0	Fujian Tianxin (3)	Rugao Olympic Sports Center, Nantong
15:00	Ji Jun 11'; Hu Ming 31'; 35' (o.g.); Ren Xinlong 83'			Referee: Li Peng

24 March 2018	Anhui Hefei Guiguan (3)	1–0	Nanjing Shaye (A)	Anqing Sports Centre, Anqing
15:00	Tang Ge 45'			Referee: Yan Xu

24 March 2018	Suzhou Dongwu (3)	3–0	Shenyang Dongjin (3)	Changshu Stadium, Changshu
15:30	Wu Yufan 12', 45'; Zheng Yi 24'			Referee: Xiang Yao

24 March 2018	Hainan Boying (3)	2–0	Jiangxi Liansheng (3)	Hainan Sport School Stadium, Haikou
16:00	Liu Haidong 29', 50' (pen.)			Referee: Gan Shuran

24 March 2018	Baoding Yingli ETS (3)	10–1	Yunnan Flying Tigers (3)	Hebei University Stadium, Baoding
16:00	Hou Zhe 3', 5', 64', 85'; Wang Hanbing 6'; Di You 44', 71' (pen.); Yang Hao 57'; Wang Xinyu 74'; Cong Minhang 90'		He Yaqi 33'	Referee: Wu Kai

25 March 2018	Shenyang Urban (3)	2–2 (4–3 p)	Baotou Nanjiao (3)	Shenyang Urban Construction University Stadium, Shenyang
14:00	Yang Jian 37'; Zhang Xingbo 89'		Almjan Abdugheni 6', 80'	Referee: Hao Pengbo

25 March 2018	Qingdao Jonoon (3)	3–0	Guangzhou Haoxin (A)	Jimo Powerise District Sports Center, Qingdao
14:00	Li Kai 18'; Zhang Huanan 72', 88'			Referee: Zhuang Chunxiang

25 March 2018	Ningbo Yinbo (A)	1–2	Yanbian Beiguo (3)	Ningbo Fubang Stadium, Ningbo
14:00	Chen Lie 10'		Zheng Yongjie 51', 60'	Referee: Geng Maoxiang

25 March 2018	Dalian Boyoung (3)	1–0	Beijing BIT (3)	Jinzhou Stadium, Dalian
14:30	Xu Xin 37'			Referee: Deng Peng

25 March 2018	Shanghai Sunfun (3)	1–4	Jilin Baijia (3)	Kangqiao Football Base, Shanghai
14:30	Pan Jiyuan 39'		Li Xin 7', 9'; Li Xun 32'; Li Yuankun 64'	Referee: Li Pengda

25 March 2018	Shaanxi Chang'an Athletic (3)	1–1 (4–2 p)	Hebei Elite (3)	Shaanxi Province Stadium, Xi'an
15:00	Yang He 48'		Luo Heng 29'	Referee: Chen Dong
	Penalties
	Yan Feng (penalty scored); Wang Erzhuo (penalty scored); Zou You (penalty scored); Du Junpeng (penalty scored)		(penalty scored) Cui Hao; (penalty scored) Luo Heng; (penalty missed) Shi Jun; (penalty missed) Yuan Ye

25 March 2018	Sichuan Longfor (3)	1–1 (4–3 p)	Jiangsu Yancheng Dingli (3)	Dujiangyan Phoenix Stadium, Dujiangyan
16:00	Zhang Zhichao 56'		Xue Chen 60'	Referee: Liu Xinyu

25 March 2018	Sichuan Jiuniu (3)	1–1 (3–0 p)	Zibo Sunday (3)	Nanhu Sports Center, Zigong
16:00	Wu Weijian 4'		Li Zhuangfei 49'	Referee: Han Lei

25 March 2018	Shanghai Jiading Boji (A)	1–3	Yinchuan Helanshan (3)	Jiading Stadium, Shanghai
19:30	Xu Bin 17'		Ötkür Hesen 46'; Song Bo 68'; Chen Bo 78'	Referee: Li Haixin

Notes

1. Jilin Baijia was given home advantage according to the rules, but the match was later switched to be hosted by Shanghai Sunfun.

== Third round ==
10 April 2018	Dalian Boyoung (3)	1–1 (3–0 p)	Zhejiang Yiteng (2)	Jinzhou Stadium, Dalian
15:00	Wang Xin 41'		Wei Jiawei 49'	Attendance: 363; Referee: Liu Di

10 April 2018	Shenyang Urban (3)	1–1 (4–3 p)	Yanbian Funde (2)	Shenyang Urban Construction University Stadium, Shenyang
15:00	Wu Dingmao 25'		Cui Ren 45'	Attendance: 1,648; Referee: Shan Dan'ao

10 April 2018	Hunan Billows (3)	1–3	Shanghai Shenxin (2)	Yiyang Stadium, Yiyang
15:00	Liu Shuai 66'		Wang Jingbin 2'; Pan Chaoran 45'; Xu Junmin 67'	Attendance: 421; Referee: Gan Shuran

10 April 2018	Qingdao Jonoon (3)	0–1	Heilongjiang Lava Spring (2)	Jimo Powerise District Sports Center, Qingdao
15:00			Tan Liwei 58'	Attendance: 261; Referee: Ning Zhaobing

10 April 2018	Baoding Yingli ETS (3)	0–1	Liaoning F.C. (2)	Hebei University Stadium, Baoding
15:00			Wang Hao 54'	Attendance: 1,101; Referee: Chen Chao

10 April 2018	Wuhan Zall (2)	2–0	Jilin Baijia (3)	Tazi Lake Sports Centre, Wuhan
15:30	Huang Xiyang 45'; Liu Yun 52'			Attendance: 0 Referee: Liu Xinyu

10 April 2018	Suzhou Dongwu (3)	2–1	Shenzhen FC (2)	Changshu Stadium, Changshu
15:30	Liu Huan 35'; Bian Jun 44'		Wang Tong 13'	Attendance: 258; Referee: Yan Xu

10 April 2018	Sichuan Jiuniu (3)	3–1	Dalian Transcendence (2)	Nanhu Sports Center, Zigong
16:00	Zhao Jun 46'; Li Endian 53'; Ruan Jun 57'		Wang Xiaoxing 30'	Attendance: 3,613; Referee: Liu Xindong

11 April 2018	Yanbian Beiguo (3)	1–0	Meizhou Meixian Techand (2)	Hunchun People's Stadium, Hunchun
15:00	Song Jian 85'			Attendance: 689; Referee: Geng Maoxiang

11 April 2018	Yinchuan Helanshan (3)	1–0	Beijing Enterprises (2)	Helan Mountain Stadium, Yinchuan
15:30	Song Bo 13'			Attendance: 3,847; Referee: Xu Qiangqiang

11 April 2018	Sichuan Longfor (3)	3–0	Qingdao Huanghai (2)	Dujiangyan Phoenix Stadium, Dujiangyan
16:00	Qu Cheng 68', 81'; Shang Yin 74'			Attendance: 1,046; Referee: Zhu Wenbin

11 April 2018	Hainan Boying (3)	0–0 (3–1 p)	Meizhou Hakka (2)	Hainan Sport School Stadium, Haikou
16:00				Attendance: 1,220; Referee: Ding Chao

11 April 2018	Shaanxi Chang'an Athletic (3)	1–0	Zhejiang Greentown (2)	Shaanxi Province Stadium, Xi'an
19:30	Du Junpeng 33'			Attendance: 22,869; Referee: Niu Minghui

11 April 2018	Nantong Zhiyun (3)	1–0	Nei Mongol Zhongyou (2)	Rugao Olympic Sports Center, Nantong
19:35	Ji Jun 49'			Attendance: 11,806; Referee: Hao Pengbo

11 April 2018	Anhui Hefei Guiguan (3)	1–0	Xinjiang Tianshan Leopard (2)	Anqing Sports Centre, Anqing
19:35	Qiu Shi 77'			Attendance: 485; Referee: Zhuang Chunxiang

12 April 2018	Wuhan Chufeng Heli (A)	1–1 (3–0 p)	Shijiazhuang Ever Bright (2)	Xinhua Road Sports Center, Wuhan
15:00	Huang Lei 85' (pen.)		Yang Yiming 33'	Attendance: 236; Referee: Huang Yi

Notes

1. Jilin Baijia was given home advantage according to the rules, but the match was later switched to be hosted by Wuhan Zall.

== Fourth round ==
24 April 2018	Wuhan Chufeng Heli (A)	0–2	Guangzhou R&F (1)	Xinhua Road Sports Center, Wuhan
15:00			Lu Lin 45'; Xiao Zhi 88'	Attendance: 216; Referee: Tang Kun

24 April 2018	Dalian Boyoung (3)	0–3	Tianjin Quanjian (1)	Jinzhou Stadium, Dalian
15:30			Su Yuanjie 2', 17'; Pei Shuai 89'	Attendance: 800; Referee: He Xin

24 April 2018	Shenyang Urban (3)	2–1	Henan Jianye (1)	Shenyang Urban Construction University Stadium, Shenyang
15:30	Li Zhibin 14', 45'		Du Changjie 76'	Attendance: 2,628; Referee: Xu Qiangqiang

24 April 2018	Liaoning F.C. (2)	1–4	Dalian Yifang (1)	Tiexi New District Sports Center, Shenyang
15:30	Yang Shuai 36'		Sun Guowen 13'; Liu Yingchen 29'; Zhao Xuebin 32' (pen.); Zhang Hui 82'	Attendance: 1,527; Referee: Yang Kaizi

24 April 2018	Sichuan Jiuniu (3)	1–1 (4–3 p)	Changchun Yatai (1)	Nanhu Sports Center, Zigong
16:00	Xiao Yufeng 43' (o.g.)		Tan Tiancheng 60' (pen.)	Attendance: 4,832; Referee: Qin Xiaohan
	Penalties
	Yang Xinxin (penalty scored); Shan Xialu (penalty missed); Zhao Jun (penalty missed); Hao Shuang (penalty scored); Ruan Jun (penalty scored); He Shuang (penalty scored)		(penalty missed) Tan Tiancheng; (penalty scored) Zhou Dadi; (penalty scored) Yan Zhiyu; (penalty scored) Cao Ziheng; (penalty missed) Wu Yake; (penalty missed) Han Zilong

24 April 2018	Suzhou Dongwu (3)	0–4	Hebei China Fortune (1)	Changshu Stadium, Changshu
19:30			Luo Senwen 2'; Ren Hang 18'; Zhang Chengdong 30'; Wang Qiuming 70'	Attendance: 1,580; Referee: Gao Peng

25 April 2018	Yanbian Beiguo (3)	0–6	Shandong Luneng Taishan (1)	Hunchun People's Stadium, Hunchun
14:00			Cheng Yuan 30', 68', 80'; Li Songyi 39', 78'; Qi Tianyu 63'	Attendance: 8,123; Referee: Huang Yi

25 April 2018	Hainan Boying (3)	2–2 (3–5 p)	Beijing Renhe (1)	Hainan Sport School Stadium, Haikou
15:30	Zhou Shichao 3'; Zhang Kaiming 90+2'		Wang Chu 43', 76'	Attendance: 1,561; Referee: Dai Yige
	Penalties
	Liu Haidong (penalty scored); Zhang Kaiming (penalty missed); Zhang Ao (penalty scored); Hu Yangyang (penalty scored)		(penalty scored) Chen Jie; (penalty scored) Cao Yongjing; (penalty scored) Wang Chu; (penalty scored) Nizamdin Ependi; (penalty scored) Luo Xin

25 April 2018	Wuhan Zall (2)	2–2 (5–6 p)	Tianjin Teda (1)	Tazi Lake Sports Centre, Wuhan
15:30	Ai Zhibo 33'; Song Zhiwei 48'		Mao Haoyu 63'; Johnathan 66'	Attendance: 517; Referee: Niu Minghui
	Penalties
	Huang Xiyang (penalty scored); Song Zhiwei (penalty scored); Ni Bo (penalty scored); Zhou Tong (penalty scored); Kang Zhenjie (penalty scored); Li Zhichao (penalty missed)		(penalty scored) Johnathan; (penalty scored) Bastians; (penalty scored) Yang Fan; (penalty scored) Qiu Tianyi; (penalty scored) Li Yuanyi; (penalty scored) Tan Wangsong

25 April 2018	Heilongjiang Lava Spring (2)	1–2	Guizhou Hengfeng (1)	Harbin ICE Center Stadium, Harbin
15:30	Gueye 66'		Tang Xin 10'; Zhang Yuan 83'	Attendance: 6,878; Referee: Xing Qi

25 April 2018	Shanghai Shenxin (2)	0–1	Beijing Sinobo Guoan (1)	Jinshan Sports Centre, Shanghai
18:00			Soriano 87'	Attendance: 6,530; Referee: Liu Wei

25 April 2018	Sichuan Longfor (3)	0–1	Jiangsu Suning (1)	Dujiangyan Phoenix Stadium, Dujiangyan
19:35			Chen Shaoqin 90' (o.g.)	Attendance: 6,876; Referee: Zhang Chao

25 April 2018	Yinchuan Helanshan (3)	0–1	Guangzhou Evergrande Taobao (1)	Helan Mountain Stadium, Yinchuan
19:35			Zhang Wenzhao 25'	Attendance: 26,723; Referee: Zhang Xiaochen

25 April 2018	Nantong Zhiyun (3)	3–2	Shanghai Greenland Shenhua (1)	Rugao Olympic Sports Center, Nantong
19:35	Eddy Francis 58' (o.g.); Hu Ming 62'; Ji Jun 85'		Gao Di 11'; Wang Yun 31' (pen.)	Attendance: 13,806; Referee: Shan Dan'ao

25 April 2018	Anhui Hefei Guiguan (3)	0–2	Chongqing Dangdai Lifan (1)	Anqing Sports Centre, Anqing
19:35			Sui Donglu 73'; Feng Jing 90+2'	Attendance: 1,387; Referee: Sun Lei

25 April 2018	Shaanxi Chang'an Athletic (3)	0–1	Shanghai SIPG (1)	Shaanxi Province Stadium, Xi'an
20:00			Wu Lei 36'	Attendance: 39,636; Referee: Maimaitijiang

== Fifth round ==
1 May 2018	Tianjin Quanjian (1)	2–2 (7–8 p)	Jiangsu Suning (1)	Haihe Educational Football Stadium, Tianjin
19:35	Mi Haolun 89'; Witsel 90+3'		Teixeira 54', 68' (pen.)	Attendance: 10,062; Referee: Shi Zhenlu
	Penalties
	Modeste (penalty missed); Wang Yongpo (penalty scored); Zhao Xuri (penalty scored); Kwon Kyung-won (penalty scored); Witsel (penalty scored); Wang Xiaolong (penalty scored); Mi Haolun (penalty scored); Sun Ke (penalty scored); Chu Jinzhao (penalty missed)		(penalty scored) Teixeira; (penalty scored) Li Ang; (penalty scored) Gao Tianyi; (penalty scored) Ji Xiang; (penalty missed) Paletta; (penalty scored) Yang Xiaotian; (penalty scored) Tian Yinong; (penalty scored) Zhang Xiaobin; (penalty scored) Huang Zichang

2 May 2018	Shenyang Urban (3)	1–2	Guangzhou R&F (1)	Shenyang Urban Construction University Stadium, Shenyang
15:00	Xu Bo 12'		Zhang Jiaqi 45+3'; Lu Lin 59'	Attendance: 869; Referee: Hei Xiaohu

2 May 2018	Hebei China Fortune (1)	2–3	Shandong Luneng Taishan (1)	Langfang Stadium, Langfang
16:00	Mascherano 78'; Hernanes 81' (pen.)		Gil 28'; Cissé 82', 86'	Attendance: 5,323; Referee: Ma Ning

2 May 2018	Shanghai SIPG (1)	0–0 (4–3 p)	Beijing Renhe (1)	Shanghai Stadium, Shanghai
19:30				Attendance: 17,575; Referee: Jin Jingyuan
	Penalties
	Elkeson (penalty scored); Lü Wenjun (penalty missed); Hulk (penalty scored); Wu Lei (penalty scored); Shi Ke (penalty scored)		(penalty scored) Moukandjo; (penalty scored) Nizamdin; (penalty missed) Chen Jie; (penalty scored) Ivo; (penalty missed) Fernández

2 May 2018	Nantong Zhiyun (3)	1–1 (7–8 p)	Sichuan Jiuniu (3)	Rugao Olympic Sports Center, Nantong
19:35	Zhu Zhengrong 70'		Cao Yiyao 28'	Attendance: 11,805; Referee: Liu Lin
	Penalties
	Zhu Zhengrong (penalty scored); Ji Jun (penalty scored); Yu Jianfeng (penalty scored); Hu Ming (penalty scored); Wang Kai (penalty missed); Qian Changjie (penalty scored); Song Yue (penalty scored); Nan Yunqi (penalty scored); Wang Yongxin (penalty missed)		(penalty scored) Yang Xinxin; (penalty scored) Hao Shuang; (penalty scored) He Shuang; (penalty scored) Zhao Jun; (penalty missed) Wu Weijian; (penalty scored) Shan Xialu; (penalty scored) Cao Yiyao; (penalty scored) Zheng Yu; (penalty scored) Li Endian

2 May 2018	Chongqing Dangdai Lifan (1)	0–1	Dalian Yifang (1)	Chongqing Olympic Sports Center, Chongqing
19:35			Sun Bo 90+2'	Attendance: 10,856; Referee: Wang Di

2 May 2018	Guangzhou Evergrande Taobao (1)	2–2 (1–4 p)	Guizhou Hengfeng (1)	Tianhe Stadium, Guangzhou
19:50 (Note: The match, originally scheduled for 19:35 local time, was delayed 15 minutes due to thunderstorm.)	Tang Shi 22'; Alan 53' (pen.)		Zheng Kaimu 44'; Liang Xueming 87'	Attendance: 18,739; Referee: Guan Xing
	Penalties
	Alan (penalty missed); Deng Yubiao (penalty scored); Deng Hanwen (penalty missed)		(penalty scored) Chery; (penalty scored) Li Yingjian; (penalty scored) Min Junlin; (penalty scored) Zhu Zhengyu

2 May 2018	Beijing Sinobo Guoan (1)	1–0	Tianjin Teda (1)	Workers' Stadium, Beijing
20:00	Soriano 68'			Attendance: 32,017; Referee: Wang Jing

== Bracket (quarter-finals onwards) ==
Quarter-finals
Jiangsu Suning (1)	0	2	2
Guangzhou R&F (1)	0	3	3
Shanghai SIPG (1)	1	2	3 (4)
Beijing Sinobo Guoan (1) (p)	2	1	3 (5)
Guizhou Hengfeng (1)	0	0	0
Shandong Luneng Taishan (1)	0	3	3
Sichuan Jiuniu (3)	0	0	0
Dalian Yifang (1)	3	2	5

Semi-finals
Guangzhou R&F (1)	1	0	1
Beijing Sinobo Guoan (1)	5	3	8
Shandong Luneng Taishan (1)	1	3	4
Dalian Yifang (1)	0	0	0

Final
Beijing Sinobo Guoan (1)	1	2	3
Shandong Luneng Taishan (1)	1	2	3

== Quarter-finals ==
=== First leg ===
9 June 2018	Beijing Sinobo Guoan (1)	2–1	Shanghai SIPG (1)	Workers' Stadium, Beijing
19:35	Viera 14'; Soriano 63' (pen.)		Hulk 34'	Attendance: 40,769; Referee: Ko Hyung-jin (South Korea)

7 July 2018	Dalian Yifang (1)	3–0	Sichuan Jiuniu (3)	Dalian Sports Center Stadium, Dalian
19:35	Zhu Ting 44'; Wang Jiong 52' (o.g.); Zhao Xuebin 80'			Attendance: 10,208; Referee: Ai Kun

8 July 2018	Jiangsu Suning (1)	0–0	Guangzhou R&F (1)	Nanjing Olympic Sports Centre, Nanjing
19:00				Attendance: 29,416; Referee: Wang Jing

8 July 2018	Guizhou Hengfeng (1)	0–0	Shandong Luneng Taishan (1)	Guiyang Olympic Sports Center, Guiyang
19:35				Attendance: 12,627; Referee: Shen Yinhao

=== Second leg ===
24 July 2018	Sichuan Jiuniu (3)	0–2	Dalian Yifang (1)	Chengdu Longquanyi Football Stadium, Chengdu
19:35			Qin Sheng 41' (pen.); Cui Ming'an 52'	Attendance: 9,116; Referee: Fu Ming

Dalian Yifang won 5–0 on aggregate.

25 July 2018	Shandong Luneng Taishan (1)	3–0	Guizhou Hengfeng (1)	Jinan Olympic Sports Center Stadium, Jinan
18:00	Liu Junshuai 19'; Gil 59'; Zhang Chi 90+2'			Attendance: 20,128; Referee: Ma Ning

Shandong Luneng Taishan won 3–0 on aggregate.

25 July 2018	Shanghai SIPG (1)	2–1 (a.e.t.) (4–5 p)	Beijing Sinobo Guoan (1)	Shanghai Stadium, Shanghai
19:35	Yu Hai 18'; Cai Huikang 39'		Viera 90+4'	Attendance: 21,813; Referee: Kim Hee-gon (South Korea)
	Penalties
	Elkeson (penalty missed); Lü Wenjun (penalty scored); Oscar (penalty scored); Wang Shenchao (penalty scored); Wu Lei (penalty scored)		(penalty scored) Soriano; (penalty scored) Viera; (penalty scored) Zhang Xizhe; (penalty scored) Wei Shihao; (penalty scored) Augusto

3–3 on aggregate. Beijing Sinobo Guoan won 5–4 on penalties.

25 July 2018	Guangzhou R&F (1)	3–2	Jiangsu Suning (1)	Yuexiushan Stadium, Guangzhou
20:00	Zhang Chenlong 21'; Zahavi 42', 90+7' (pen.)		Ji Xiang 18'; Xie Pengfei 55'	Attendance: 9,386; Referee: Shi Zhenlu

Guangzhou R&F won 3–2 on aggregate.

== Semi-finals ==
=== First leg ===
21 August 2018	Dalian Yifang (1)	0–1	Shandong Luneng Taishan (1)	Dalian Sports Center Stadium, Dalian
19:35			Jin Jingdao 14'	Attendance: 13,829; Referee: Gu Chunhan

22 August 2018	Beijing Sinobo Guoan (1)	5–1	Guangzhou R&F (1)	Workers' Stadium, Beijing
19:35	Bakambu 14', 90+1'; Viera 48', 56'; Zhang Xizhe 82'		Lu Lin 25'	Attendance: 30,619; Referee: Ma Ning

=== Second leg ===
25 September 2018	Shandong Luneng Taishan (1)	3–0	Dalian Yifang (1)	Jinan Olympic Sports Center Stadium, Jinan
18:30	Liu Yang 48'; Jin Jingdao 52'; Tardelli 65' (pen.)			Attendance: 15,369; Referee: Milorad Mažić (Serbia)

Shandong Luneng Taishan won 4–0 on aggregate.

26 September 2018	Guangzhou R&F (1)	0–3	Beijing Sinobo Guoan (1)	Yuexiushan Stadium, Guangzhou
19:35			Bakambu 17'; Wei Shihao 85', 88'	Attendance: 7,808; Referee: Chae Sang-hyeop (South Korea)

Beijing Sinobo Guoan won 8–1 on aggregate.

== Final ==
=== First leg ===
25 November 2018
19:35

Beijing Sinobo Guoan (1)	1–1	Shandong Luneng Taishan (1)
Bakambu 51' (pen.)		Tardelli 31' (pen.)

Workers' Stadium, Beijing
Attendance: 48,856
Referee: Mark Clattenburg (England)

GK	1	(China) Hou Sen
RB	28	(China) Jiang Tao
CB	3	(China) Yu Yang
CB	19	(China) Yu Dabao (c)
LB	4	(China) Li Lei
CM	5	(Brazil) Renato Augusto		(substituted off) 90+1'
CM	6	(China) Chi Zhongguo
CM	8	(China) Piao Cheng
AM	23	(Spain) Jonathan Viera	(yellow card) 90+4'
AM	10	(China) Zhang Xizhe
CF	17	(Democratic Republic of the Congo) Cédric Bakambu
Substitutes:
GK	25	(China) Guo Quanbo
DF	15	(China) Liu Huan
DF	18	(China) Jin Taiyan
DF	24	(China) Zhang Yu
DF	30	(China) Lei Tenglong		(substituted on) 90+1'
MF	26	(China) Lü Peng
FW	7	(China) Wei Shihao
Manager:
(Germany) Roger Schmidt

GK	20	(China) Han Rongze
RB	35	(China) Dai Lin
CB	4	(Brazil) Gil
CB	6	(China) Wang Tong
LB	5	(China) Zheng Zheng
RM	17	(China) Wu Xinghan	(yellow card) 40'	(substituted off) 54'
CM	22	(China) Hao Junmin (c)
CM	33	(China) Jin Jingdao
LM	13	(China) Zhang Chi
CF	19	(Italy) Graziano Pellè	(yellow card) 45'
CF	9	(Brazil) Diego Tardelli		(substituted off) 84'
Substitutes:
GK	1	(China) Liu Zhenli
DF	3	(China) Liu Junshuai
DF	11	(China) Liu Yang	(yellow card) 76'	(substituted on) 54'
MF	7	(China) Cui Peng
MF	16	(China) Zhou Haibin		(substituted on) 84'
MF	23	(China) Song Long
FW	29	(China) Cheng Yuan
Manager:
(China) Li Xiaopeng

Assistant referees:
Abdukhamidullo Rasulov (Uzbekistan)
Jakhongir Saidov (Uzbekistan)
Fourth official:
Li Haixin (Guangzhou FA)
Video assistant referee:
Gu Chunhan (Wuhan FA)
Assistant video assistant referees:
Zhang Long (Xi'an FA)

=== Second leg ===
30 November 2018
19:35

Shandong Luneng Taishan (1)	2–2	Beijing Sinobo Guoan (1)
Gil 31'; Tardelli 89'		Viera 16'; Zhang Xizhe 81'

Jinan Olympic Sports Center Stadium, Jinan
Attendance: 45,666
Referee: Matthew Conger (New Zealand)

GK	20	(China) Han Rongze
RB	35	(China) Dai Lin	(yellow card) 62' (yellow-red card) 90+5'
CB	4	(Brazil) Gil
CB	6	(China) Wang Tong
LB	5	(China) Zheng Zheng	(yellow card) 56'
RM	17	(China) Wu Xinghan		(substituted off) 29'
CM	22	(China) Hao Junmin (c)
CM	33	(China) Jin Jingdao		(substituted off) 84'
LM	13	(China) Zhang Chi		(substituted off) 65'
CF	19	(Italy) Graziano Pellè
CF	9	(Brazil) Diego Tardelli	(yellow card) 57'
Substitutes:
GK	1	(China) Liu Zhenli
DF	3	(China) Liu Junshuai		(substituted on) 84'
DF	11	(China) Liu Yang		(substituted on) 65'
MF	7	(China) Cui Peng	(yellow card) 71'	(substituted on) 29'
MF	16	(China) Zhou Haibin
MF	23	(China) Song Long
FW	29	(China) Cheng Yuan
Manager:
(China) Li Xiaopeng

GK	1	(China) Hou Sen
RB	28	(China) Jiang Tao
CB	3	(China) Yu Yang	(yellow card) 64'
CB	19	(China) Yu Dabao (c)	(yellow card) 38'
LB	4	(China) Li Lei
CM	5	(Brazil) Renato Augusto
CM	6	(China) Chi Zhongguo		(substituted off) 90+4'
CM	8	(China) Piao Cheng		(substituted off) 90+6'
AM	23	(Spain) Jonathan Viera	(yellow card) 90+3'
AM	10	(China) Zhang Xizhe		(substituted off) 87'
CF	17	(Democratic Republic of the Congo) Cédric Bakambu
Substitutes:
GK	25	(China) Guo Quanbo
DF	15	(China) Liu Huan
DF	18	(China) Jin Taiyan
DF	24	(China) Zhang Yu		(substituted on) 90+4'
DF	30	(China) Lei Tenglong		(substituted on) 87'
MF	26	(China) Lü Peng		(substituted on) 90+6'
FW	7	(China) Wei Shihao
Manager:
(Germany) Roger Schmidt

Assistant referees:
Tevita Makasini (Tonga)
Mark Rule (New Zealand)
Fourth official:
Jin Jingyuan (Chongqing FA)
Video assistant referee:
Ma Ning (Jiangsu FA)
Assistant video assistant referees:
Wang Di (Shanghai FA)

3–3 on aggregate. Beijing Sinobo Guoan won on away goals.

== Awards ==
- Top Scorer: (Spain) Jonathan Viera (Beijing Sinobo Guoan) (5 goals)
- Most Valuable Player: (China) Zhang Xizhe (Beijing Sinobo Guoan)
- Fair Play Award: Sichuan Jiuniu
- Dark Horse Award: Shenyang Urban

=== Most Valuable Player of The Round ===
Round	MVP	Club	Ref.
1	(China) Xia Shicong	Jinan Dayou	
2	(China) Song Zhenyu	Shaanxi Chang'an Athletic	
3	(China) Wang Jingbin	Shanghai Shenxin	
4	(China) Zhang Wenzhao	Guangzhou Evergrande Taobao	
5	(China) Yan Junling	Shanghai SIPG	
QF	(Spain) Jonathan Viera	Beijing Sinobo Guoan	
