= 2018 Chinese FA Cup final =

Association football match in 2018

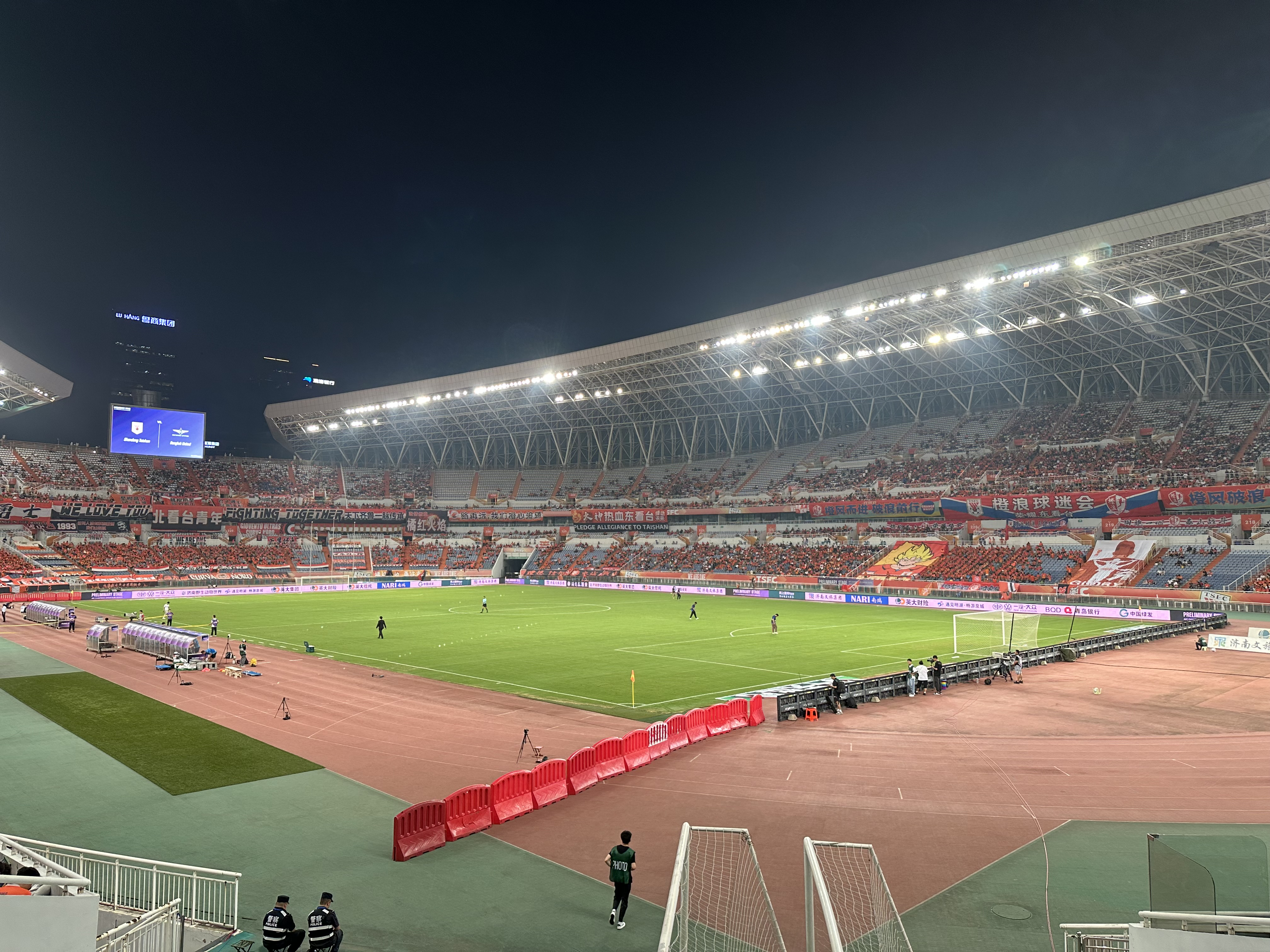
- The second leg took place at the Jinan Olympic Sports Center Stadium
- Event: 2018 Chinese FA Cup
Beijing Sinobo Guoan	Shandong Luneng Taishan
3	3
- on aggregate Beijing Sinobo Guoan won on away goals

First leg
Beijing Sinobo Guoan	Shandong Luneng Taishan
1	1
- Date: 25 November 2018
- Venue: Workers' Stadium, Beijing
- Referee: Mark Clattenburg (England)
- Attendance: 48,856

Second leg
Shandong Luneng Taishan	Beijing Sinobo Guoan
2	2
- Date: 30 November 2018
- Venue: Jinan Olympic Sports Center Stadium, Jinan
- Referee: Matthew Conger (New Zealand)
- Attendance: 45,666

The 2018 Chinese FA Cup final was the final of the 2018 Chinese FA Cup, the 20th edition of the national football cup of China, the Chinese FA Cup. It was contested between Chinese Super League clubs Beijing Sinobo Guoan and Shandong Luneng Taishan.

The final was contested in two-legged home-and-away format with the away goals rule. The first leg was hosted by Beijing Sinobo Guoan in Beijing at the Workers' Stadium on 25 November 2018, while the second leg was hosted by Shandong Luneng Taishan in Jinan at the Jinan Olympic Sports Center Stadium on 30 November 2018.

In the first leg, Beijing Sinobo Guoan drew with Shandong Luneng Taishan 1–1 in front of 48,856 spectators, with a penalty scored each from Diego Tardelli for Shandong and Cédric Bakambu for Beijing. With 45,666 in attendance in the second leg, the match was level at 1–1 after goals from Beijing's Jonathan Viera and Shandong's Gil by half-time. In the second half, Beijing scored a crucial away goal through Zhang Xizhe. Although Diego Tardelli scored one late in the match, the full-time score stood at 2–2, and Beijing Sinobo Guoan won the final on away goals, marking the club's first Chinese FA Cup title in fifteen years and fifth in its history. Through this cup triumph, Beijing Sinobo Guoan qualified for the group stage of the 2019 AFC Champions League, as well as the 2019 Chinese FA Super Cup.

== Venues ==
The first leg was played at the Workers' Stadium, the traditional home ground of Beijing Sinobo Guoan. In the second leg, the match was played at the Jinan Olympic Sports Center Stadium in Jinan, Shandong, the traditional home ground of Shandong Luneng Taishan.

== Route to the final ==
Beijing Sinobo Guoan				Round	Shandong Luneng Taishan			
Opponent	Result			Round	Opponent	Result		
Shanghai Shenxin	1–0 (A)			Fourth round	Yanbian Beiguo	6–0 (A)		
Tianjin TEDA	1–0 (H)			Fifth round	Hebei China Fortune	3–2 (A)		
Opponent	Agg.	1st leg	2nd leg	Round	Opponent	Agg.	1st leg	2nd leg
Shanghai SIPG	3–3 (5–4 p)	2–1 (H)	1–2 (a.e.t.) (A)	Quarter-finals	Guizhou Hengfeng	3–0	0–0 (A)	3–0 (H)
Guangzhou R&F	8–1	5–1 (H)	3–0 (A)	Semi-finals	Dalian Yifang	4–0	1–0 (A)	3–0 (H)
Note: In all results above, the score of the finalist is given first (H: home; A: away).

=== Beijing Sinobo Guoan ===
On 25 April, Beijing Sinobo Guoan began its Chinese FA Cup run with a 1–0 away victory over China League One side Shanghai Shenxin in the fourth round. In the 87th minute, forward Jonathan Soriano scored the only goal in the match to take Guoan through to the next round. In the fifth round, Beijing Sinobo Guoan hosted Chinese Super League outfit Tianjin TEDA on 2 May. Jonathan Soriano scored in the 68th minute in an eventual 1–0 win.

In the quarter-finals, Beijing Sinobo Guoan faced Shanghai SIPG in a two-legged tie. In the first leg on 9 June, Beijing Sinobo Guoan beat Shanghai SIPG 2–1 at home. Jonathan Viera opened the scoring for Beijing, and Hulk equalised for Shanghai SIPG in the 34th minute. In the 63rd minute, it took a penalty from Jonathan Soriano to retake the lead for Beijing Sinobo Guoan. With the disadvantage going into the second leg played on 25 July, Yu Hai and Cai Huikang scored two first-half goals to go ahead on aggregate for Shanghai SIPG. However, in the fourth minute of second-half added time, Jonathan Viera scored from a direct free-kick on the edge of the penalty area to take the match into extra-time. With extra-time goalless, the match went into a penalty shoot-out. Renato Augusto scored the winning penalty to take Beijing Sinobo Guoan into the semi-finals.

In the semi-finals, Beijing Sinobo Guoan played against Guangzhou R&F over two legs. On 22 August, Beijing enjoyed a 5–1 thrashing of Guangzhou R&F at home in the first leg. Cédric Bakambu scored first for Beijing, while Lu Lin equalised for Guangzhou R&F before half-time. In the second half, two goals for Beijing from Jonathan Viera, a goal from Zhang Xizhe, and a second goal from Cédric Bakambu put the game to bed. In the second leg on 26 September, a goal from Cédric Bakambu and two late goals from substitute Wei Shihao secured a 3–0 result for Beijing Sinobo Guoan away from home to progress into the final.

=== Shandong Luneng Taishan ===
On 25 April, Shandong Luneng Taishan entered the competition to visit China League Two side Yanbian Beiguo in the fourth round. A hat-trick from Cheng Yuan, two goals from Li Songyi, and a goal from Qi Tianyu sealed a 6–0 away victory for Shandong Luneng. On 2 May, Shandong Luneng Taishan beat Chinese Super League club Hebei China Fortune 3–2 away from home. Gil scored the opener for Shandong, and while a goal each from Javier Mascherano and Hernanes briefly put Hebei China Fortune in front, a late brace from Papiss Cissé sealed Shandong's place in the quarter-finals.

Shandong Luneng Taishan lined up against Chinese Super League club Guizhou Hengfeng in the quarter-finals. In the away first leg, Shandong Luneng Taishan held a goalless 0–0 draw for ninety minutes on 8 July. At home in the second leg on 25 July, a goal each from Liu Junshuai, Gil, and Zhang Chi for Shandong secured a 3–0 victory to send the club into the semi-finals.

On 21 August, Shandong Luneng Taishan took on Dalian Yifang in the first leg away from home. A 14th-minute goal from Jin Jingdao gave Shandong Luneng an advantage going into the second leg. In the home second leg on 25 September, three second-half goals for Shandong from Liu Yang, Jin Jingdao, and Diego Tardelli, respectively, booked Shandong's place in the final.

== Match ==
=== First leg ===
==== Details ====
25 November 2018
19:35 CST

Beijing Sinobo Guoan	1–1	Shandong Luneng Taishan
Bakambu 51' (pen.)	Report	Tardelli 31' (pen.)

Workers' Stadium, Beijing
Attendance: 48,856
Referee: Mark Clattenburg (England)

Beijing Sinobo Guoan	Shandong Luneng Taishan

GK	1	(China) Hou Sen
RB	28	(China) Jiang Tao
CB	3	(China) Yu Yang
CB	19	(China) Yu Dabao
LB	4	(China) Li Lei
CM	5	(Brazil) Renato Augusto	(substituted off) 90+1'
CM	6	(China) Chi Zhongguo
CM	22	(China) Piao Cheng
AM	23	(Spain) Jonathan Viera
AM	10	(China) Zhang Xizhe
CF	17	(Democratic Republic of the Congo) Cédric Bakambu
Substitutes:
GK	25	(China) Guo Quanbo
GK	15	(China) Liu Huan
DF	18	(China) Jin Taiyan
DF	24	(China) Zhang Yu
DF	30	(China) Lei Tenglong	(substituted on) 90+1'
MF	26	(China) Lü Peng
FW	7	(China) Wei Shihao
Manager:
(Germany) Roger Schmidt

GK	20	(China) Han Rongze
RB	35	(China) Dai Lin
CB	4	(Brazil) Gil
CB	6	(China) Wang Tong
LB	5	(China) Zheng Zheng
RM	17	(China) Wu Xinghan	(yellow card) 40'	(substituted off) 54'
CM	22	(China) Hao Junmin
CM	33	(China) Jin Jingdao
LM	13	(China) Zhang Chi
CF	19	(Italy) Graziano Pellè	(yellow card) 45'
CF	9	(Brazil) Diego Tardelli		(substituted off) 84'
Substitutes:
GK	1	(China) Liu Zhenli
DF	3	(China) Liu Junshuai
DF	11	(China) Liu Yang	(yellow card) 76'	(substituted on) 54'
MF	7	(China) Cui Peng
MF	16	(China) Zhou Haibin		(substituted on) 84'
MF	23	(China) Song Long
FW	29	(China) Cheng Yuan
Manager:
(China) Li Xiaopeng

Assistant referees:
Abdukhamidullo Rasulov (Uzbekistan)
Jakhongir Saidov (Uzbekistan)
Fourth official:
Li Haixin (Guangzhou FA)
Video assistant referee:
Gu Chunhan (Wuhan FA)
Assistant video assistant referees:
Zhang Long (Xi'an FA)

=== Second leg ===
==== Details ====
30 November 2018
19:35 CST

Shandong Luneng Taishan	2–2	Beijing Sinobo Guoan
Gil 31'; Tardelli 89'	Report	Viera 16'; Zhang Xizhe 81'

Jinan Olympic Sports Center Stadium, Jinan
Attendance: 45,666
Referee: Matthew Conger (New Zealand)

Shandong Luneng Taishan	Beijing Sinobo Guoan

GK	20	(China) Han Rongze
RB	35	(China) Dai Lin	(yellow card) 60' (yellow-red card) 90+5'
CB	4	(Brazil) Gil
CB	6	(China) Wang Tong
LB	5	(China) Zheng Zheng	(yellow card) 56'
RM	17	(China) Wu Xinghan		(substituted off) 29'
CM	22	(China) Hao Junmin
CM	33	(China) Jin Jingdao		(substituted off) 84'
LM	13	(China) Zhang Chi		(substituted off) 65'
CF	19	(Italy) Graziano Pellè
CF	9	(Brazil) Diego Tardelli	(yellow card) 57'
Substitutes:
GK	1	(China) Liu Zhenli
DF	3	(China) Liu Junshuai		(substituted on) 84'
DF	11	(China) Liu Yang		(substituted on) 65'
MF	7	(China) Cui Peng	(yellow card) 71'	(substituted on) 29'
MF	16	(China) Zhou Haibin
MF	23	(China) Song Long
FW	29	(China) Cheng Yuan
Manager:
(China) Li Xiaopeng

GK	1	(China) Hou Sen
RB	28	(China) Jiang Tao
CB	3	(China) Yu Yang	(yellow card) 64'
CB	19	(China) Yu Dabao	(yellow card) 38'
LB	4	(China) Li Lei
CM	5	(Brazil) Renato Augusto
CM	6	(China) Chi Zhongguo		(substituted off) 90+4'
CM	22	(China) Piao Cheng		(substituted off) 90+6'
AM	23	(Spain) Jonathan Viera	(yellow card) 90+3'
AM	10	(China) Zhang Xizhe		(substituted off) 87'
CF	17	(Democratic Republic of the Congo) Cédric Bakambu
Substitutes:
GK	25	(China) Guo Quanbo
GK	15	(China) Liu Huan
DF	18	(China) Jin Taiyan
DF	24	(China) Zhang Yu		(substituted on) 90+4'
DF	30	(China) Lei Tenglong		(substituted on) 87'
MF	26	(China) Lü Peng		(substituted on) 90+6'
FW	7	(China) Wei Shihao
Manager:
(Germany) Roger Schmidt

Assistant referees:
Tevita Makasini (Tonga)
Mark Rule (New Zealand)
Fourth official:
Jin Jingyuan (Chongqing FA)
Video assistant referee:
Ma Ning (Jiangsu FA)
Assistant video assistant referees:
Wang Di (Shanghai FA)
