= Zhang Kaiming =

Chinese association football player

Personal information
- Date of birth: 17 May 1990 (age 36)
- Height: 1.85 m (6 ft 1 in)
- Position: Defender

Team information
- Current team: Dalian Zhixing

Senior career*
Years	Team	Apps	(Gls)
2015	Jiangxi Beidamen	27	(1)
2016–2018	Hainan Boying	57	(8)
2019–2022	Jiangxi Beidamen	55	(3)
2022–	Dalian Zhixing		
- * Club domestic league appearances and goals as of 14:01, 9 April 2022 (UTC)

Zhang Kaiming (Chinese: 张凯铭; born 17 May 1990) is a Chinese footballer currently playing as a defender for Dalian Zhixing.

== Career statistics ==
=== Club ===
As of 24 August 2021.

Club	Season	League			Cup		Other		Total	
Club	Season	Division	Apps	Goals	Apps	Goals	Apps	Goals	Apps	Goals
Jiangxi Beidamen	2015	China League One	27	1	2 (Note: Appearances in the Chinese FA Cup)	0	0	0	29	1
Hainan Boying	2016	China League Two	16	3	3	0	2 (Note: Appearances in the China League Two playoffs)	1	21	4
Hainan Boying	2017	China League Two	18	3	0	0	2	0	20	3
Hainan Boying	2018	China League Two	23	2	2	1	2	0	27	3
Hainan Boying	Total		57	8	5	1	6	1	68	10
Jiangxi Beidamen	2019	China League Two	27	2	0	0	4	0	31	2
Jiangxi Beidamen	2020	China League One	10	1	0	0	1 (Note: Appearances in the China League One relegation playoffs)	0	11	1
Jiangxi Beidamen	2021	China League One	4	0	0	0	0	0	4	0
Jiangxi Beidamen	Total		41	3	0	0	5	0	46	3
Career total			125	12	5	1	11	1	141	14
