= Hu Yangyang =

Chinese association football player

Personal information
- Date of birth: 18 October 1995 (age 31)
- Place of birth: Meizhou, Guangdong, China
- Height: 1.76 m (5 ft 9 in)
- Position: Forward

Senior career*
Years	Team	Apps	(Gls)
2014–2018	Guangzhou Evergrande	0	(0)
2018	Hainan Boying	19	(1)
- * Club domestic league appearances and goals as of 14:01, 1 February 2020 (UTC)

Hu Yangyang (Chinese: 胡扬扬; born 18 October 1995) is a Chinese footballer.

== Career statistics ==
=== Club ===
As of 1 February 2020.

Club	Season	League			Cup		Continental		Other		Total	
Club	Season	Division	Apps	Goals	Apps	Goals	Apps	Goals	Apps	Goals	Apps	Goals
Guangzhou Evergrande	2014	Chinese Super League	0	0	0	0	–		1 (Note: Appearances in the Chinese FA Super Cup)	0	1	0
Guangzhou Evergrande	2015	Chinese Super League	0	0	0	0	–		0	0	0	0
Guangzhou Evergrande	2016	Chinese Super League	0	0	0	0	–		0	0	0	0
Guangzhou Evergrande	2017	Chinese Super League	0	0	0	0	–		0	0	0	0
Guangzhou Evergrande	2018	Chinese Super League	0	0	0	0	–		0	0	0	0
Guangzhou Evergrande	Total		0	0	0	0	0	0	1	0	1	0
Hainan Boying	2018	China League Two	19	1	2 (Note: Appearances in the Chinese FA Cup)	0	–		0	0	21	1
Career total			19	1	2	0	0	0	1	0	22	1
