= Liu Yang (footballer, born 1995) =

Chinese footballer

Liu Yang 刘洋
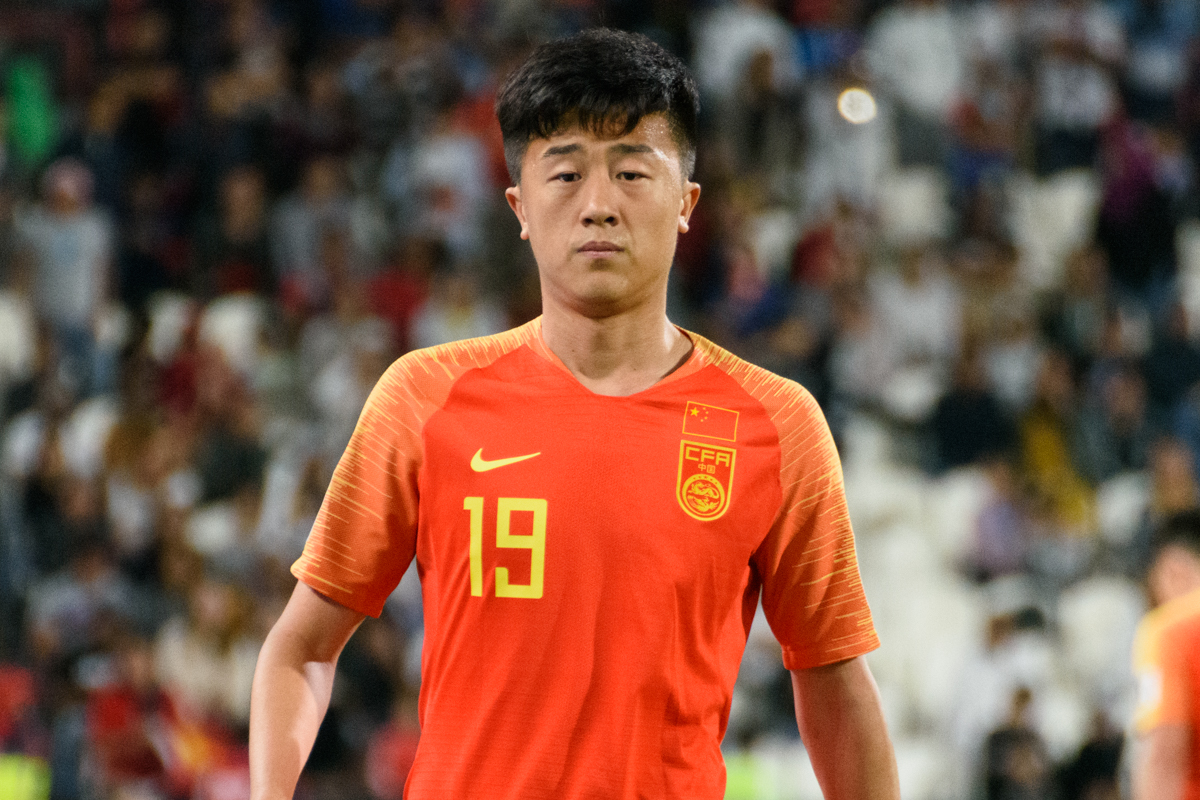
- Liu in 2019

Personal information
- Date of birth: 17 June 1995 (age 31)
- Place of birth: Qingdao, Shandong, China
- Height: 1.84 m (6 ft 0 in)
- Positions: Left-back; left winger

Team information
- Current team: Shandong Taishan
- Number: 11

Youth career
- 2010–2015: Shandong Luneng

Senior career*
Years	Team	Apps	(Gls)
2014–2015	Sintrense	2	(0)
2015	Cova da Piedade	1	(0)
2015–2016	Oriental Dragon	0	(0)
2015–2016	→ Cova da Piedade (loan)	6	(0)
2016–	Shandong Taishan	212	(9)

International career^{‡}
2017–2018	China U23	14	(1)
2018–	China	42	(0)
2023	China U23 (wildcard)	5	(0)
- * Club domestic league appearances and goals as of 19 November 2026 ‡ National team caps and goals as of 6 January 2024

Liu Yang (Chinese: 刘洋; pinyin: Liú Yáng; born 17 June 1995) is a Chinese professional footballer who currently plays as a left-back or left winger for Chinese Super League club Shandong Taishan and the China national team.

== Club career ==
In 2010, Liu joined Chinese Super League side Shandong Luneng Taishan's youth academy (now renamed Shandong Taishan), where he shifted his position from forward to central-back. He was sent to Portugal for further training in 2014. He joined Campeonato de Portugal side Sintrense in the summer of 2014. On 12 October 2014, he made his senior debut in a 2–1 away win against Sacavenense, coming on as a substitute for Romário in the 72nd minute. Liu moved to another Campeonato de Portugal club Cova da Piedade on 1 February 2015. He made his debut for Cova da Piedade on 24 May 2015 in a 3–1 away win over Sacavenense. Liu played six match for the club in the 2015–16 season as Cova da Piedade finish the first place of the league and won promotion to the second tier.

Liu returned to Shandong Luneng and was promoted to the first team squad by manager Felix Magath in July 2016. He played as a left-back under Magath. On 22 October 2016, he made his debut for Shandong in a 4–1 away defeat against Shanghai SIPG, coming on for Song Long in the 70th minute. In the 2018 season, Liu mainly played as a left winger under manager Li Xiaopeng. On 25 September 2018, he scored his first senior goal in a 3–0 home win against Dalian Yifang in the 2018 Chinese FA Cup semi-finals. He scored his first league goal against Changchun Yatai on 2 November 2018, which ensured Shandong's 2–0 victory and sealed a seat for 2019 AFC Champions League.

In January 2019, Liu extended his contract with the club until the end of the 2023 season. He would repay the club with this contract by establishing himself as a vital member within the team that won the 2020 Chinese FA Cup against Jiangsu Suning F.C. in a 2–0 victory. A consistent versatile regular within the team, he would gain his first league title with the club when he was part of the team that won the 2021 Chinese Super League title. This would be followed up by him winning the 2022 Chinese FA Cup with them the next season.

== International career ==
Liu received his first call up for the China national football team by manager Marcello Lippi for the training camp of 2019 AFC Asian Cup. On 24 December 2018, he made his international senior debut in a 2–1 defeat against Iraq. He was named in the final 23-man squad, and played all five matches for China in the tournament.

Liu was named in China's squad for the 2023 AFC Asian Cup in Qatar and started the team's opening match against Tajikistan on 13 January 2024.

== Career statistics ==
=== Club ===
As of match played 19 November 2026

Appearances and goals by club, season and competition
Club	Season	League			National cup		Continental		Other		Total	
Club	Season	Division	Apps	Goals	Apps	Goals	Apps	Goals	Apps	Goals	Apps	Goals
Sintrense	2014–15	Campeonato de Portugal	2	0	0	0	–		–		2	0
Cova da Piedade	2014–15	Campeonato de Portugal	1	0	0	0	–		–		1	0
Cova da Piedade (loan)	2015–16	Campeonato de Portugal	6	0	0	0	–		–		6	0
Shandong Luneng/ Shandong Taishan	2016	Chinese Super League	1	0	0	0	0	0	–		1	0
Shandong Luneng/ Shandong Taishan	2017	Chinese Super League	6	0	0	0	–		–		6	0
Shandong Luneng/ Shandong Taishan	2018	Chinese Super League	14	1	5	1	–		–		19	2
Shandong Luneng/ Shandong Taishan	2019	Chinese Super League	25	0	4	0	6	0	–		35	0
Shandong Luneng/ Shandong Taishan	2020	Chinese Super League	14	0	5	1	–		–		19	1
Shandong Luneng/ Shandong Taishan	2021	Chinese Super League	18	1	7	2	–		–		25	3
Shandong Luneng/ Shandong Taishan	2022	Chinese Super League	29	2	4	2	0	0	–		33	4
Shandong Luneng/ Shandong Taishan	2023	Chinese Super League	24	0	2	0	8	0	1 (Note: Appearances in Chinese FA Super Cup)	0	35	0
Shandong Luneng/ Shandong Taishan	2024	Chinese Super League	25	1	3	0	7	0	–		35	1
Shandong Luneng/ Shandong Taishan	2026	Chinese Super League	29	2	2	1	–		–		31	3
Shandong Luneng/ Shandong Taishan	2025	Chinese Super League	27	2	2	1	–		–		31	3
Shandong Luneng/ Shandong Taishan	Total		212	9	34	8	21	0	1	0	268	17
Career total			221	9	34	8	21	0	1	0	277	17

=== International ===
Appearances and goals by national team and year
National team	Year	Apps	Goals
China	2018	2	0
China	2019	9	0
China	2020	0	0
China	2021	0	0
China	2022	3	0
China	2023	8	0
China	2024	10	0
China	2025	0	0
China	2026	10	0
Total		42	0

== Honours ==
Cova da Piedade

- Campeonato de Portugal: 2015–16

Shandong Luneng, Shandong Taishan

- Chinese Super League: 2021
- Chinese FA Cup: 2020, 2021, 2022
