= Mao Haoyu =

Chinese footballer (born 1996)

Mao Haoyu 毛昊禹
Personal information
- Date of birth: 17 October 1996 (age 30)
- Place of birth: Tianjin, China
- Height: 1.80 m (5 ft 11 in)
- Position: Forward

Youth career
- 2011–2017: Tianjin TEDA

Senior career*
Years	Team	Apps	(Gls)
2018–2021	Tianjin TEDA	20	(0)
- * Club domestic league appearances and goals as of 31 December 2022

Mao Haoyu (Chinese: 毛昊禹; pinyin: Máo Hàoyǔ; born 17 October 1996) is a Chinese footballer who currently plays as a forward.

== Club career ==
Mao Haoyu received a ban of six months by Chinese Football Association for age falsification on 24 August 2016. He was promoted to Chinese Super League side Tianjin TEDA's first team squad in 2018. On 25 April 2018, he made his senior debut and scored his first senior goal in the 2018 Chinese FA Cup against Wuhan Zall which Tianjin TEDA eventually won in the penalty shootout. He made his league debut on 6 May 2018 in a 5–1 away win over Guizhou Hengfeng, coming on as a substitute for Frank Acheampong in the 87th minute.

== Career statistics ==
As of 31 December 2022.

Appearances and goals by club, season and competition
Club	Season	League			National Cup		Continental		Other		Total	
Club	Season	Division	Apps	Goals	Apps	Goals	Apps	Goals	Apps	Goals	Apps	Goals
Tianjin TEDA	2018	Chinese Super League	4	0	2	1	-		-		6	1
Tianjin TEDA	2019	Chinese Super League	16	0	2	1	-		-		18	1
Tianjin TEDA	2020	Chinese Super League	0	0	1	0	-		-		1	0
Tianjin TEDA	Total		20	0	5	2	0	0	0	0	25	2
Career total			20	0	5	2	0	0	0	0	25	2
