= Zhang Ao (footballer) =

Chinese footballer

Zhang Ao 张奥
Personal information
- Date of birth: 16 January 1991 (age 35)
- Place of birth: Taiyuan, Shanxi, China
- Height: 1.80 m (5 ft 11 in)
- Position: Defender

Team information
- Current team: Shanxi Chongde Ronghai
- Number: 23

Youth career
- Changsha Ginde

Senior career*
Years	Team	Apps	(Gls)
2010–2014	Guangzhou R&F	17	(0)
2015–2017	Hebei China Fortune	0	(0)
2018	Hainan Boying	23	(1)
2019–2021	Xinjiang Tianshan Leopard	26	(1)
2022-2023	Guangxi Lanhang	22	(1)
2025-	Shanxi Chongde Ronghai	15	(0)
- * Club domestic league appearances and goals as of 31 December 2020

Zhang Ao (Chinese: 张奥; pinyin: Zhāng Ào; born 16 January 1991) is a Chinese football player who currently plays for China League Two side Shanxi Chongde Ronghai.

== Club career ==
Zhang joined Changsha Ginde youth team system in the early year and was promoted to first team squad in 2010. He made his senior debut on 24 July 2010, in a 4–1 away defeat against Shandong Luneng Taishan. He played four matches in the 2010 league season, as Changsha Ginde finished the bottom of the league and relegation to China League One. In February 2011, the club moved to Shenzhen as the club's name changed into Shenzhen Phoenix, Zhang chose to stay in the club. The club were then bought by Chinese property developers Guangzhou R&F and moved to Guangzhou in June 2011 and won promotion back to the Super League at the first attempt. Zhang made 11 league appearances in the season.

On 2 March 2018, Zhang transferred to China League Two side Hainan Boying. The next season he joined second tier football club Xinjiang Tianshan Leopard and would go on to make his debut on 9 March 2019 in a league game against Guangdong South China Tiger F.C. that ended in a 2–0 defeat. This would be followed by his first goal for the club in a league game on 27 July 2019 against Nantong Zhiyun in a 2–2 draw.

== Career statistics ==
Statistics accurate as of match played 31 December 2020.

Appearances and goals by club, season and competition
Club	Season	League			National Cup		Continental		Other		Total	
Club	Season	Division	Apps	Goals	Apps	Goals	Apps	Goals	Apps	Goals	Apps	Goals
Guangzhou R&F	2010	Chinese Super League	4	0	-		-		-		4	0
Guangzhou R&F	2011	China League One	11	0	2	0	-		-		13	0
Guangzhou R&F	2012	Chinese Super League	1	0	0	0	-		-		1	0
Guangzhou R&F	2013	Chinese Super League	0	0	0	0	-		-		0	0
Guangzhou R&F	2014	Chinese Super League	1	0	0	0	-		-		1	0
Guangzhou R&F	Total		17	0	2	0	0	0	0	0	19	0
Hebei China Fortune	2015	China League One	0	0	0	0	-		-		0	0
Hainan Boying	2018	China League Two	23	1	2	0	-		-		25	1
Xinjiang Tianshan Leopard	2019	China League One	20	1	1	0	-		-		21	1
Xinjiang Tianshan Leopard	2020	China League One	6	0	-		-		2 (Note: Appearances in China League One Relegation play-offs)	0	8	0
Xinjiang Tianshan Leopard	Total		26	1	1	0	0	0	2	0	29	1
Career Total			66	2	5	0	0	0	2	0	73	2
