= Liu Junshuai =

Chinese footballer (born 1995)

Liu Junshuai 刘军帅
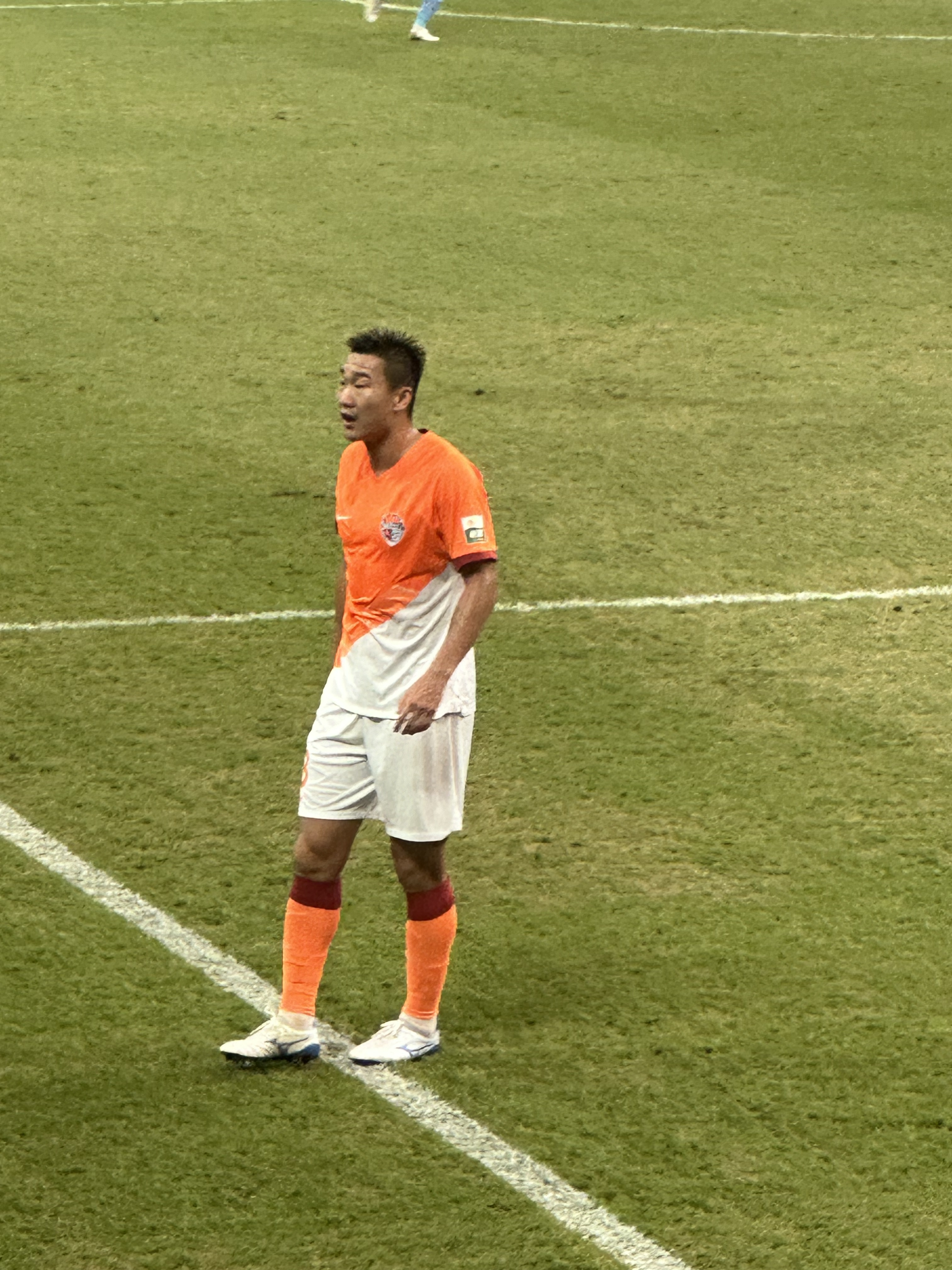
- Liu in 2024

Personal information
- Date of birth: 10 January 1995 (age 31)
- Place of birth: Qingdao, Shandong, China
- Height: 1.85 m (6 ft 1 in)
- Position: Defender

Team information
- Current team: Qingdao Hainiu
- Number: 3

Youth career
- Qingdao Jonoon
- 2011–2012: Fátima
- 2012–2013: Alverca
- 2013–2014: Real Massamá

Senior career*
Years	Team	Apps	(Gls)
2014–2015	Atlético Cacém	22	(1)
2015–2017	Torreense	23	(3)
2016	→ Jiangsu Suning (loan)	0	(0)
2017–2022	Shandong Luneng	69	(2)
2022	→ Qingdao Hainiu (loan)	31	(6)
2023–	Qingdao Hainiu	94	(4)

International career^{‡}
2014	China U20	10	(0)
2016–2017	China U23	20	(1)
- * Club domestic league appearances and goals as of 22 November 2026 ‡ National team caps and goals as of 12 November 2017

Liu Junshuai (simplified Chinese: 刘军帅; traditional Chinese: 劉軍帥; pinyin: Liú Jūnshuài; born 10 January 1995) is a Chinese professional footballer who plays for Chinese Super League club Qingdao Hainiu.

== Club career ==
Liu Junshuai went to Portugal for further training as a part of the Chinese Football Association's Project in 2011. He played for Fátima, Alverca and Real Massamá's youth academy between 2011 and 2014. He made his senior debut with Portuguese District Championships club Atlético Cacém in the 2014–15 season. Liu moved to Campeonato de Portugal side União Torreense in July 2015.

On 15 July 2016, Liu was loaned to Chinese Super League side Jiangsu Suning along with Yang Ailong. He played for Jiangsu Suning's reserve team in the 2016 season.

=== Shandong Luneng ===
Liu transferred to fellow Chinese Super League side Shandong Luneng on 5 February 2017. He made his debut for Shandong on 7 April 2017 in a 2–1 away defeat against Shanghai SIPG. On 25 July 2018, he scored his first goal for the club in a 3–0 home win over Guizhou Hengfeng in the quarter-finals of 2018 Chinese FA Cup. He would go on to establish himself as a regular within the team and would go on to be part of the squad that won the 2020 Chinese FA Cup.

=== Qingdao Hainiu ===
On 29 April 2022, he transferred on loan to second tier club Qingdao Hainiu. He would go on to make his debut in a league game on 9 June 2022 against Shaanxi Chang'an Athletic in a 1-1 draw. He would go on to establish himself as regular within the team that gained promotion to the top tier at the end of the 2022 China League One campaign.

== Career statistics ==
As of match played 23 July 2025

Appearances and goals by club, season and competition
Club	Season	League			National cup		Continental		Other		Total	
Club	Season	Division	Apps	Goals	Apps	Goals	Apps	Goals	Apps	Goals	Apps	Goals
Atlético Cacém	2014–15	Lisbon FA Pró-National Division	22	1	–		–		–		22	1
União Torreense	2015–16	Campeonato de Portugal	23	3	1	0	–		–		24	3
Shandong Luneng Taishan	2017	Chinese Super League	12	0	1	0	–		–		13	0
Shandong Luneng Taishan	2018	Chinese Super League	25	2	6	1	–		–		31	3
Shandong Luneng Taishan	2019	Chinese Super League	19	0	4	0	4	2	–		27	2
Shandong Luneng Taishan	2020	Chinese Super League	13	0	2	0	–		–		15	0
Shandong Luneng Taishan	2021	Chinese Super League	0	0	1	0	–		–		1	0
Shandong Luneng Taishan	Total		69	2	14	1	4	2	0	0	87	5
Qingdao Hainiu (loan)	2022	China League One	31	6	0	0	–		–		31	6
Qingdao Hainiu	2023	Chinese Super League	25	1	3	0	–		–		28	1
Qingdao Hainiu	2024	Chinese Super League	25	1	2	0	–		–		27	1
Qingdao Hainiu	2025	Chinese Super League	15	1	3	0	–		–		18	1
Qingdao Hainiu	Total		65	3	8	0	0	0	0	0	73	3
Career total			210	15	23	1	4	2	0	0	237	18

== Honours ==
Shandong Luneng

- Chinese Super League: 2021
- Chinese FA Cup: 2020, 2021
