= Liu Peng (footballer) =

Chinese association football player

Personal information
- Date of birth: 17 October 1989 (age 37)
- Place of birth: Tianjin, China
- Height: 1.92 m (6 ft 4 in)
- Position: Goalkeeper

Team information
- Current team: Heilongjiang Ice City

Youth career
- Tianjin TEDA

Senior career*
Years	Team	Apps	(Gls)
2010	Tianjin TEDA	0	(0)
2011–2013	Shenyang Dongjin	31	(0)
2014–2019	Qingdao Huanghai	84	(0)
2019–2020	Beijing Renhe	0	(0)
2020	→ Heilongjiang Lava Spring (loan)	0	(0)
2021–2022	Shanghai Jiading Huilong F.C.	21	(0)
2022-	Heilongjiang Ice City	0	(0)
- * Club domestic league appearances and goals as of 14:01, 25 April 2022 (UTC)

Liu Peng (simplified Chinese: 刘鹏; traditional Chinese: 劉鵬; pinyin: Liú Péng; born 17 October 1989) is a Chinese footballer currently playing as a goalkeeper for Heilongjiang Ice City

== Club career ==
Liu Peng would play for the Tianjin TEDA youth team before being promoted to the senior team at the beginning of the 2010 Chinese Super League season. He would move to second tier club Shenyang Dongjin. Throughout the 2014 China League One season he joined Qingdao Huanghai on a free transfer. He would spend five seasons at Qingdao where he established himself as regular within the team. At the beginning of the 2019 league season he would join top tier club Beijing Renhe and would make his debut in a Chinese FA Cup game on 29 May 2019 that ended in a 5-0 defeat.

== Career statistics ==
As of 31 December 2020.

Appearances and goals by club, season and competition
Club	Season	League			National Cup		Continental		Other		Total	
Club	Season	Division	Apps	Goals	Apps	Goals	Apps	Goals	Apps	Goals	Apps	Goals
Tianjin TEDA	2010	Chinese Super League	0	0	0	0	-		-		0	0
Shenyang Dongjin	2011	China League One	5	0	1	0	-		-		6	0
Shenyang Dongjin	2012	China League One	20	0	0	0	-		-		20	0
Shenyang Dongjin	2013	China League Two	6	0	0	0	-		-		6	0
Shenyang Dongjin	Total		31	0	1	0	0	0	0	0	32	0
Qingdao Huanghai	2014	China League One	1	0	0	0	-		-		1	0
Qingdao Huanghai	2015	China League One	26	0	0	0	-		-		26	0
Qingdao Huanghai	2016	China League One	26	0	0	0	-		-		26	0
Qingdao Huanghai	2017	China League One	28	0	0	0	-		-		28	0
Qingdao Huanghai	2018	China League One	4	0	0	0	-		-		4	0
Qingdao Huanghai	Total		85	0	0	0	0	0	0	0	85	0
Beijing Renhe	2019	Chinese Super League	0	0	1	0	-		-		1	0
Heilongjiang Lava Spring (loan)	2020	China League One	0	0	-		-		0 (Note: Appearances in China League One relegation play-offs)	0	0	0
Career total			116	0	2	0	0	0	0	0	118	0
