= Ruan Jun =

Chinese association football player

Personal information
- Date of birth: 29 June 1997 (age 29)
- Place of birth: Mianyang, Sichuan, China
- Height: 1.75 m (5 ft 9 in)
- Position: Forward

Youth career
- –2016: Sichuan Youth

Senior career*
Years	Team	Apps	(Gls)
2016–2021	Sichuan Jiuniu	74	(22)
2022	Tai'an Tiankuang	11	(1)
2023	Dongguan United	29	(8)
2024	Yunnan Yukun	2	(0)
2024–2025	Shaanxi Union	20	(1)
2025	→ Foshan Nanshi (loan)	9	(0)
Total		143	(31)
- * Club domestic league appearances and goals as of 20 October 2024

Ruan Jun (Chinese: 阮君; born 29 June 1997) was a Chinese footballer who played as a forward.

== Club Career ==
On 29 January 2026, the Chinese Football Association announced that Ruan was banned from football-related activities in China for life for involving in match-fixing.

== Career statistics ==
=== Club ===
Appearances and goals by club, season and competition
Club	Season	League			Cup		Continental		Other		Total	
Club	Season	Division	Apps	Goals	Apps	Goals	Apps	Goals	Apps	Goals	Apps	Goals
Sichuan Jiuniu	2016	CFA Amateur League	–		3 (Note: Appearances in the Chinese FA Cup)	2	–		0	0	3	2
Sichuan Jiuniu	2017	CFA Amateur League	–		0	0	–		0	0	0	0
Sichuan Jiuniu	2018	China League Two	21	7	7	2	–		0	0	28	9
Sichuan Jiuniu	2019	China League Two	25	11	1	0	–		2 (Note: Appearances in the China League Two playoffs)	1	28	12
Sichuan Jiuniu	2020	China League One	5	0	–		–		–		5	0
Sichuan Jiuniu	2021	China League One	21	3	4	0	–		–		25	3
Sichuan Jiuniu	Total		72	21	15	4	0	0	2	1	89	26
Tai'an Tiankuang	2022	China League Two	11	1	–		–		–		11	1
Dongguan United	2023	China League One	29	8	2	1	–		–		31	9
Yunnan Yukun	2024	China League One	2	0	1	0	–		–		3	0
Shaanxi Union	2024	China League Two	14	1	–		–		–		14	1
Shaanxi Union	2025	China League One	6	0	2	0	–		–		8	0
Shaanxi Union	Total		20	1	2	0	0	0	0	0	22	1
Foshan Nanshi (loan)	2025	China League One	9	0	–		–		–		9	0
Career total			143	31	20	5	0	0	2	1	165	37
