= 1995 Chinese FA Cup =

1995 China Football Association Cup
CFA Cup

Tournament details
- Country: China
- Teams: 16

Final positions
- Champions: Jinan Taishan (1st title)
- Runners-up: Shanghai Shenhua
- Asian Cup Winners' Cup: Jinan Taishan (withdrawal)

Tournament statistics
- Matches played: 29
- Goals scored: 85 (2.93 per match)
- Top goal scorer(s): (China) Tang Xiaocheng (6 goals)

The PHILIPS 1995 China FA Cup (Chinese: 1995飞利浦中国足球协会杯) was the inaugural edition of Chinese FA Cup after professional football league was established in China. The cup title sponsor was Philips.

== Results ==
=== First round ===
==== First leg ====
| 25 June | Foshan | 2–2 | Dalian Wanda | New Plaza Stadium, Foshan |

| 25 June | Guangzhou Matsunichi | 4–2 | Guangzhou Apollo | Guangdong Provincial People's Stadium, Guangzhou |

| 25 June | Tianjin | 1–2 | Shanghai Shenhua | Minyuan Stadium, Tianjin |

| 25 June | Qingdao Hainiu | 0–1 | Liaoning | Qingdao First Stadium, Qingdao |

| 25 June | Jiangsu Maint | 2–1 | Jinan Taishan | Wutaishan Stadium, Nanjing |

| 25 June | Shenyang Huayang | 1–2 | Sichuan Quanxing | Wulihe Stadium, Shenyang |

| 25 June | Yanbian Hyundai | 0–2 | Guangdong Hongyuan | Changchun Stadium, Changchun |

| 25 June | Bayi | 0–1 | Beijing Guoan | Xi'an People's Stadium, Xi'an |

==== Second leg ====
| 2 July | Dalian Wanda | 4–1 (6–3 agg.) | Foshan | Dalian People's Stadium, Dalian |

| 2 July | Guangzhou Apollo | 1–0 (3–4 agg.) | Guangzhou Matsunichi | Yuexiushan Stadium, Guangzhou |

| 2 July | Shanghai Shenhua | 3–1 (5–2 agg.) | Tianjin | Hongkou Stadium, Shanghai |

| 2 July | Liaoning | 3– 0 (4–2 agg.) | Qingdao Hainiu | Wulihe Stadium, Shenyang |

| 2 July | Jinan Taishan | 2–0 (3–2 agg.) | Jiangsu Maint | Shandong Provincial Stadium, Jinan |

| 2 July | Sichuan Quanxing | 3–0 (5–1 agg.) | Shenyang Huayang | Chengdu Sports Centre, Chengdu |

| 2 July | Guangdong Hongyuan | 2–1 (4–1 agg.) | Yanbian Hyundai | Dongguan Stadium, Dongguan |

| 2 July | Beijing Guoan | 4–0 (5–0 agg.) | Bayi | Xiannongtan Stadium, Beijing |

=== Second round ===
==== First leg ====
| 9 July | Dalian Wanda | 0–1 | Beijing Guoan | Dalian People's Stadium, Dalian |

| 9 July | Guangzhou Matsunichi | 2–0 | Guangdong Hongyuan | Guangdong Provincial People's Stadium, Guangzhou |

| 9 July | Shanghai Shenhua | 2–1 | Sichuan Quanxing | Hongkou Stadium, Shanghai |

| 9 July | Liaoning | 4–1 | Jinan Taishan | Wulihe Stadium, Shenyang |

==== Second leg ====
| 16 July | Beijing Guoan | 1–0 (2–0 agg.) | Dalian Wanda | Xiannongtan Stadium, Beijing |

| 16 July | Guangdong Hongyuan | 5–2 (5–4 agg.) | Guangzhou Matsunichi | Dongguan Stadium, Dongguan |

| 16 July | Sichuan Quanxing | 1–0 (a.e.t.) (2–2 agg.) (3–4 p) | Shanghai Shenhua | Chengdu Sports Centre, Chengdu |

| 16 July | Jinan Taishan | 4–0 (5–4 agg.) | Liaoning | Shandong Provincial Stadium, Jinan |

=== Semi-finals ===
==== First leg ====
| 23 July | Beijing Guoan | 2–1 | Jinan Taishan | Xiannongtan Stadium, Beijing |

| 23 July | Guangdong Hongyuan | 1–2 | Shanghai Shenhua | Dongguan Stadium, Dongguan |

==== Second leg ====
| 30 July | Jinan Taishan | 2–1 (a.e.t.) (3–3 agg.) (5–4 p) | Beijing Guoan | Shandong Provincial Stadium, Jinan |

| 30 July | Shanghai Shenhua | 0–0 (2–1 agg.) | Guangdong Hongyuan | Hongkou Stadium, Shanghai |

=== Final ===
| 26 November | Jinan Taishan | 2–0 | Shanghai Shenhua | Wutaishan Stadium, Nanjing |
| 16:00 | Tang Xiaocheng 4'; Li Xiaopeng 28' | | | Referee: Yu Jingren |
