= Lü Peng (footballer) =

Chinese footballer

Lü Peng 吕鹏
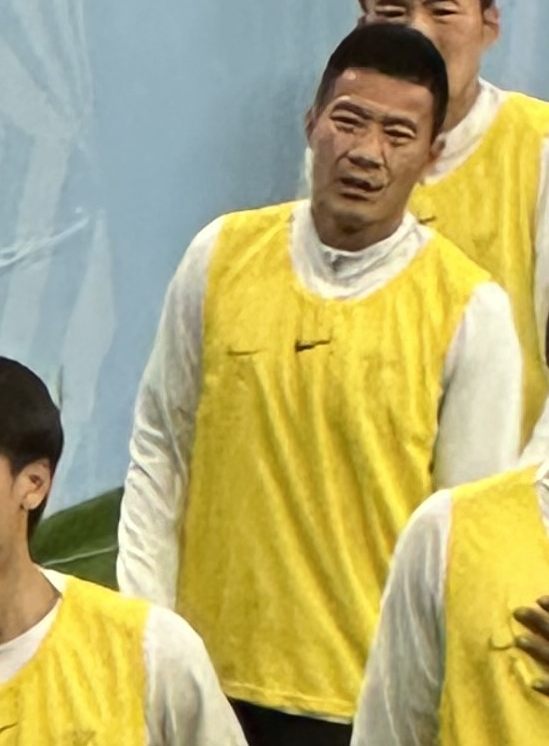
- Lü Peng in April 2025

Personal information
- Full name: Lü Peng
- Date of birth: 28 October 1989 (age 37)
- Place of birth: Dalian, Liaoning, China
- Height: 1.82 m (5 ft 11 1/2 in)
- Position: Midfielder

Team information
- Current team: Dalian Yingbo
- Number: 21

Youth career
- Dalian Shide

Senior career*
Years	Team	Apps	(Gls)
2008	Dalian Shide Siwu Singapore	14	(3)
2008–2012	Dalian Shide	117	(0)
2013–2014	Dalian Aerbin	37	(0)
2015–2016	Beijing Enterprises	58	(1)
2017–2020	Beijing Guoan	34	(0)
2021	Qingdao FC	22	(0)
2022–2023	Dalian Pro	57	(2)
2024–	Dalian Yingbo	70	(0)

International career^{‡}
2010	China U23		
2011–2012	China	9	(0)
- * Club domestic league appearances and goals as of 18 November 2026 ‡ National team caps and goals as of 2 November 2014

Lü Peng (Chinese: 吕鹏; Chinese: 呂鵬; pinyin: Lǚ Péng; born 28 October 1989) is a Chinese professional footballer who plays as midfielder for Dalian Yingbo.

== Club career ==
At the beginning of the 2008 season, Lü would break into the senior team of Dalian Shide after graduating from their youth team. He would make his debut senior appearance for Dalian with his youth teammate Yang Boyu on 25 June 2008 against Liaoning FC in a 2–1 win. As a promising midfielder, Lü would play in several more games for Dalian during the season and was one of the few bright aspects in a disappointing season for the club which saw Dalian flirt with relegation. After surviving relegation, the club would introduce Xu Hong as their new club manager and he would over overhaul the entire squad with many of youngsters that were tried out in the previous season, being one these youngsters Lü gained significant playing time and would aid Dalian to an eighth-place finish at the end of the 2009 season. The next season would see teammate and Chinese international Zhao Xuri move to Shaanxi Renhe, which allowed Lü to be permanently promoted as the club's first choice starter in midfield.

At the beginning of the 2013 season, Dalian Shide were taken over by their top tier rivals Dalian Aerbin and Lü would be part of the squad that transferred to the newly enlarged Dalian Aerbin squad. Unfortunately for him, the merger saw his new club exceed the Chinese Football Association's rules on their quota of how many transfers each club was allowed to have, which saw Lü dropped to the club's reserve's until after the summer transfer window opened and he eventually made his debut for the club on 6 July 2013 in a league game against Shandong Luneng that ended in a 1–1 draw. The following season would see him be part of the team that was relegated at the end of the 2014 Chinese Super League campaign.

On 30 January 2015, Lü transferred to China League One side Beijing Enterprises. He would revive his career and he would go on to establish himself as integral member of the team. After two seasons he moved to Chinese Super League side Beijing Guoan on 19 January 2017. He would make his debut for them in a league game on 29 April 2017 against Liaoning F.C. in a game that ended in a 4-2 victory. The following season he would establish himself as a regular within the team and help the club to go on to the win the 2018 Chinese FA Cup against Shandong Luneng. After four seasons he would join fellow top tier club Qingdao on 24 March 2021. He would be part of the team that was relegated at the end of the 2021 Chinese Super League campaign. The club would be subsequently dissolved due to financial difficulties on 13 April 2022.

On 21 April 2022 he joined top tier club Dalian Professional for the start of the 2022 Chinese Super League season. He made his debut in a league game on 4 June 2022 against Henan Songshan Longmen in a match that ended in a 2-2 draw. He would go on to establish himself as a vital member of the team and score his first goal for the club in a league game on 13 November 2022 against Guangzhou F.C. in a 1-1 draw.

== International career ==
Lü was called up to the Chinese national team by the Chinese Head coach Gao Hongbo and played against Costa Rica on 26 March 2011 where he would start the game and help guide the team to a 2–2 draw.

== Career statistics ==
=== Club statistics ===
As of match plyaed 31 December 2025.

Appearances and goals by club, season and competition
Club	Season	League			National Cup		League Cup		Continental		Other		Total	
Club	Season	Division	Apps	Goals	Apps	Goals	Apps	Goals	Apps	Goals	Apps	Goals	Apps	Goals
Dalian Shide Siwu	2008	S.League	14	3	1	0	1	0	-		-		16	3
Dalian Shide	2008	Chinese Super League	12	0	-		-		-		-		12	0
Dalian Shide	2009	Chinese Super League	18	0	-		-		-		-		18	0
Dalian Shide	2010	Chinese Super League	28	0	-		-		-		-		28	0
Dalian Shide	2011	Chinese Super League	29	0	0	0	-		-		-		29	0
Dalian Shide	2012	Chinese Super League	29	0	1	1	-		-		-		30	0
Dalian Shide	Total		117	0	1	1	0	0	0	0	0	0	118	1
Dalian Aerbin	2013	Chinese Super League	15	0	4	0	-		-		-		19	0
Dalian Aerbin	2014	Chinese Super League	22	0	0	0	-		-		-		22	0
Dalian Aerbin	Total		37	0	4	0	0	0	0	0	0	0	41	0
Beijing Enterprises	2015	China League One	29	0	3	0	-		-		-		32	0
Beijing Enterprises	2016	China League One	29	1	1	0	-		-		-		30	1
Beijing Enterprises	Total		58	1	4	0	0	0	0	0	0	0	62	1
Beijing Guoan	2017	Chinese Super League	10	0	0	0	-		-		-		10	0
Beijing Guoan	2018	Chinese Super League	6	0	3	0	-		-		-		9	0
Beijing Guoan	2019	Chinese Super League	11	0	3	0	-		3	0	1 (Note: Appearance in Chinese FA Super Cup)	0	18	0
Beijing Guoan	2020	Chinese Super League	7	0	1	0	-		5	0	-		13	0
Beijing Guoan	Total		34	0	7	0	0	0	8	0	1	0	50	0
Qingdao FC	2021	Chinese Super League	20	0	2	0	-		-		2 (Note: Appearance in Promotion/Relegation Play-offs)	0	24	0
Dalian Professional	2022	Chinese Super League	30	2	1	0	-		-		-		31	2
Dalian Professional	2023	Chinese Super League	27	0	2	0	-		-		-		29	0
Dalian Professional	Total		57	2	3	0	0	0	0	0	0	0	60	2
Dalian Yingbo	2024	China League One	30	0	1	0	-		-		-		31	0
Dalian Yingbo	2025	Chinese Super League	27	0	1	0	-		-		-		28	0
Dalian Yingbo	Total		57	0	2	0	0	0	0	0	0	0	59	0
Career total			393	6	24	1	1	0	8	0	3	0	429	7

=== International statistics ===
National team
Year	Apps	Goals
2011	2	0
2012	7	0
Total	9	0

== Honours ==
=== Club ===
Beijing Guoan

- Chinese FA Cup: 2018

Dalian Yingbo

- Chinese Super League: 2026
