= Cheng Yuan =

Chinese footballer

Cheng Yuan 成源
Personal information
- Full name: Cheng Yuan
- Date of birth: 8 October 1993 (age 33)
- Place of birth: Jinan, Shandong, China
- Height: 1.83 m (6 ft 0 in)
- Position: Forward

Youth career
- 2007–2013: Shandong Luneng

Senior career*
| Years | Team | Apps | (Gls) |
| 2011–2012 | Shandong Youth | 32 | (9) |
| 2013–2014 | → Covilhã (loan) | 3 | (0) |
| 2014–2021 | Shandong Luneng | 12 | (0) |
| 2019 | → Zibo Cuju (loan) | 11 | (9) |
| 2020 | → Taizhou Yuanda (loan) | 11 | (2) |
| 2022 | Jinan Xingzhou | 8 | (3) |
- * Club domestic league appearances and goals as of 29 April 2022

Cheng Yuan (Chinese: 成源; pinyin: Chéng Yuán; born 8 October 1993) is a Chinese former footballer.

== Club career ==
Cheng Yuan began his football career in 2011 when he was promoted to Shandong Youth's squad for the 2011 China League Two campaign. He spent two season in Shandong Youth, scoring nines goals in thirty-two appearances. In September 2013, he was loaned to Segunda Liga side S.C. Covilhã until the end of 2013/14 season. On 23 October 2013, he made his debut for Covilhã in a league match against Sporting CP B where he coming on as a substitute for Tiago Lopes in the 86th minute.

Cheng returned to Shandong and was promoted to first team squad by Cuca in the summer of 2014. On 13 May 2015, he made his debut for Shandong in a 2015 Chinese FA Cup against amateur team Wuhan New Era, coming on as a substitute for Zheng Zheng in the 65th minute. He made his Chinese Super League debut on 20 June 2015 in a 2–1 home defeat against Guangzhou Evergrande, coming on for Zheng Zheng in the 82nd minute. Although failing to establish himself within the senior team, Cheng was the highest goalscorer with a new record of 23 goals in the 2015 Chinese Super League reserve league. He was demoted to the reserve squad in July 2016 after Felix Magath became the manager of the club. He defended the title of highest goalscorer in the 2016 Chinese Super League reserve league with 20 goals. On 2 May 2017, he scored his first and second goal for the club in the 2017 Chinese FA Cup as Shandong Luneng beat China League Two club Jilin Baijia 4–1. He won the top goalscorer of Chinese Super League reserve league for the third time in 2017, scoring 24 goals in the season.

On 29 January 2026, Cheng was given a lifetime ban for match-fixing by the Chinese Football Association.

== Career statistics ==
As of 31 December 2020.

Appearances and goals by club, season and competition
| Club | Season | League | | | National Cup | | League Cup | | Continental | | Total | |
| Club | Season | Division | Apps | Goals | Apps | Goals | Apps | Goals | Apps | Goals | Apps | Goals |
|---|---|---|---|---|---|---|---|---|---|---|---|---|
| Shandong Youth | 2011 | China League Two | 11 | 2 | - | | - | | - | | 11 | 2 |
| Shandong Youth | 2012 | China League Two | 21 | 7 | 1 | 0 | - | | - | | 22 | 7 |
| Shandong Youth | Total | | 32 | 9 | 1 | 0 | 0 | 0 | 0 | 0 | 33 | 9 |
| Covilhã (loan) | 2013/14 | Segunda Liga | 3 | 0 | 0 | 0 | 1 | 0 | - | | 4 | 0 |
| Shandong Luneng | 2014 | Chinese Super League | 0 | 0 | 0 | 0 | - | | 0 | 0 | 0 | 0 |
| Shandong Luneng | 2015 | Chinese Super League | 1 | 0 | 2 | 0 | - | | 0 | 0 | 3 | 0 |
| Shandong Luneng | 2016 | Chinese Super League | 2 | 0 | 1 | 0 | - | | 2 | 0 | 5 | 0 |
| Shandong Luneng | 2017 | Chinese Super League | 5 | 0 | 1 | 2 | - | | - | | 6 | 2 |
| Shandong Luneng | 2018 | Chinese Super League | 4 | 0 | 2 | 3 | - | | - | | 6 | 3 |
| Shandong Luneng | 2019 | Chinese Super League | 1 | 0 | 1 | 0 | - | | 0 | 0 | 2 | 0 |
| Shandong Luneng | Total | | 13 | 0 | 7 | 5 | 0 | 0 | 2 | 0 | 22 | 5 |
| Zibo Cuju (loan) | 2019 | China League Two | 11 | 9 | 0 | 0 | - | | - | | 11 | 9 |
| Taizhou Yuanda (loan) | 2020 | China League One | 11 | 2 | 0 | 0 | - | | - | | 11 | 2 |
| Career total | | | 70 | 20 | 8 | 5 | 1 | 0 | 2 | 0 | 81 | 25 |

== Honours ==
=== Club ===
Shandong Luneng

- Chinese Super League: 2021
- Chinese FA Cup: 2021
- Chinese FA Super Cup: 2015
