= Cui Peng (footballer) =

Chinese footballer

Cui Peng 崔鹏
Personal information
- Full name: Cui Peng
- Date of birth: 31 May 1987 (age 39)
- Place of birth: Dalian, Liaoning, China
- Height: 1.78 m (5 ft 10 in)
- Position: Midfielder

Youth career
- 1999–2004: Shandong Luneng

Senior career*
Years	Team	Apps	(Gls)
2004–2015	Shandong Luneng	151	(10)
2014	→ Chengdu Tiancheng (loan)	15	(2)
2016	Shijiazhuang Ever Bright	12	(0)
2017–2019	Shandong Luneng	21	(0)
2020–2022	Kunshan FC	26	(2)

International career^{‡}
2005–2007	China U20		
2007–2008	China U23		
2006–2013	China	7	(0)

Managerial career
- 2022–2023: Shandong Taishan (assistant)
- 2023: Shandong Taishan U21 (assistant)
- 2024–: Shandong Taishan U17
Medal record
Representing China
Men's football
EAFF Championship
Silver medal – second place	2013 South Korea	Team
East Asian Games
Gold medal – first place	2001 Macau	Football
- * Club domestic league appearances and goals as of 1 June 2022 ‡ National team caps and goals as of 1 November 2014

Cui Peng (simplified Chinese: 崔鹏; traditional Chinese: 崔鵬; pinyin: Cuī Péng; born 31 May 1987) is a Chinese football coach and former international footballer who played as a midfielder.

== Club career ==
Cui Peng started his football career with Shandong Luneng in 2005 when he earned his first senior team appearance on 9 March 2005 in an AFC Champions League game against Yokohama Marinos. After several further appearances with the team, he would score his first goal for Shandong against Al-Ittihad in the second leg of a 2005 AFC Champions League game where he scored the second goal with a volley from 30 meters however Shandong lost the game 7–2. By the 2006 season, Cui had established himself as Shandong's first choice right midfielder and would help them win the league title and the Chinese FA Cup. On 8 July 2014, Cui was loaned out to China League One side Chengdu Tiancheng until 31 December 2014.

On 19 December 2015, Cui transferred to fellow Chinese Super League side Shijiazhuang Ever Bright. He would make his debut on 13 March 2016 in a league game against Hangzhou Greentown that ended in a 1-0 victory. Unfortunately he would sustain an injury during the season, and he was unable to aid the club from avoiding relegation, which saw him allowed to return to Shandong on 7 July 2017. On his return to Shandong he was often used as squad player for three seasons before he was allowed to leave on a free transfer to second tier club Kunshan.

== International career ==
Cui would be called up to the senior team to make his debut in a friendly against Thailand on 10 August 2006 in a 4–0 win. While he was called up by the national team for training in 2007, he did not make the squad for the 2007 AFC Asian Cup. Cui was young enough to participate in the 2008 Summer Olympics and was part of the Chinese under-23 national team squad that took part in the tournament, where he played in all three group games.

== Career statistics ==
As of 1 June 2022.

Appearances and goals by club, season and competition
Club	Season	League			National Cup		League Cup		Continental		Total	
Club	Season	Division	Apps	Goals	Apps	Goals	Apps	Goals	Apps	Goals	Apps	Goals
Shandong Luneng	2004	Chinese Super League	0	0	0	0		0	-		0	0
Shandong Luneng	2005	Chinese Super League	10	1	4	1		0	1	1	15	3
Shandong Luneng	2006	Chinese Super League	19	1	5	0	-		-		24	1
Shandong Luneng	2007	Chinese Super League	27	5	-		-		6	0	33	5
Shandong Luneng	2008	Chinese Super League	18	1	-		-		-		18	1
Shandong Luneng	2009	Chinese Super League	24	0	-		-		5	0	29	0
Shandong Luneng	2010	Chinese Super League	19	0	-		-		4	0	23	0
Shandong Luneng	2011	Chinese Super League	7	0	0	0	-		5	0	12	0
Shandong Luneng	2012	Chinese Super League	8	0	3	0	-		-		11	0
Shandong Luneng	2013	Chinese Super League	19	2	1	0	-		-		20	2
Shandong Luneng	2014	Chinese Super League	0	0	0	0	-		3	0	3	0
Shandong Luneng	2015	Chinese Super League	0	0	0	0	-		0	0	0	0
Shandong Luneng	Total		151	10	13	1	0	0	24	1	181	11
Chengdu Tiancheng (Loan)	2014	China League One	15	2	0	0	-		-		15	2
Shijiazhuang Ever Bright	2016	Chinese Super League	12	0	1	0	-		-		13	0
Shandong Luneng	2017	Chinese Super League	0	0	0	0	-		-		0	0
Shandong Luneng	2018	Chinese Super League	16	0	4	0	-		-		20	0
Shandong Luneng	2019	Chinese Super League	5	0	2	0	-		4	0	11	0
Shandong Luneng	Total		21	0	6	0	0	0	4	0	31	0
Kunshan FC	2020	China League One	13	1	2	0	-		-		15	1
Kunshan FC	2021	China League One	13	1	0	0	-		-		13	1
Kunshan FC	Total		26	2	2	0	0	0	0	0	28	2
Career total			225	14	20	1	0	0	28	1	275	16

== Honours ==
Shandong Luneng

- Chinese Super League: 2006, 2008, 2010
- Chinese FA Cup: 2006, 2014
