= Anqing Sports Centre =

Sports venue in Anqing, China

- 安庆体育中心
- Location in China
- Location: Yixiu District, Anqing, Anhui, China
- Coordinates: 30.5443°N 117.1099°E
- Capacity: 40,000

The Anqing Sports Centre (Chinese: 安庆体育中心) is a sports venue in Yixiu District, Anqing, Anhui, China. It comprises a multi-purpose stadium named Anqing Sports Centre Stadium with a seating capacity of 40,000, a 2000-seat natatorium, and a sports school. It was the main venue of the 13th Anhui Provincial Games in 2014.
