= Yu Xiang =

Chinese water polo player

Personal information
- Nationality: Chinese
- Born: 9 April 1962 (age 64)

Sport
- Sport: Water polo

Yu Xiang (born 9 April 1962) is a Chinese water polo player. He competed in the men's tournament at the 1988 Summer Olympics.
