= Song Long =

Chinese footballer (born 1989)

Song Long 宋龙
Personal information
- Full name: Song Long
- Date of birth: 20 August 1989 (age 37)
- Place of birth: Qingdao, Shandong, China
- Height: 1.82 m (5 ft 11 1/2 in)
- Positions: Left-back; midfielder

Team information
- Current team: Qingdao Hainiu
- Number: 23

Youth career
- Dalian Shide

Senior career*
Years	Team	Apps	(Gls)
2010–2016	Qingdao Jonoon	117	(4)
2016–2025	Shandong Taishan	83	(2)
2024–2025	→ Qingdao Hainiu (loan)	39	(0)
2026–	Qingdao Hainiu	18	(0)
- * Club domestic league appearances and goals as of 22 November 2026

Song Long (Chinese: 宋龙; pinyin: Sòng Lóng; born 20 August 1989 in Qingdao, Shandong) is a Chinese footballer who currently plays as a left-back or midfielder for Qingdao Hainiu in the Chinese Super League.

== Club career ==
Song joined Qingdao Jonoon from Dalian Shide in 2010. On 17 April 2010, he made his senior debut in a 2010 Chinese Super League match which Qingdao Jonoon tied with Liaoning Whowin 3–3. After the game he would go on to establish himself as regular within the team, however by the 2013 Chinese Super League season he would be part of the squad that was relegated at the end of the campaign. He remained with the club and he scored his first senior goal on 19 July 2014 in a 3–0 victory against Hebei Zhongji.

On 14 July 2016, Song transferred to Chinese Super League side Shandong Luneng. He made his debut for Shandong in a 4–1 away victory against Hangzhou Greentown. He would go on to establish himself as a regular within the team and was part of the squad that won the 2020 Chinese FA Cup against Jiangsu Suning in a 2–0 victory. A consistent versatile regular within the team, he would gain his first league title with the club when he was part of the team that won the 2021 Chinese Super League title. This would be followed up by him winning the 2022 Chinese FA Cup with them the next season.

After two years loan period, Song left Shandong Taishan and transferred to Qingdao Hainiu on 17 February 2026.

== Career statistics ==
Statistics accurate as of match played 31 January 2023.

Appearances and goals by club, season and competition
Club	Season	League			National Cup		Continental		Other		Total	
Club	Season	Division	Apps	Goals	Apps	Goals	Apps	Goals	Apps	Goals	Apps	Goals
Qingdao Jonoon	2010	Chinese Super League	21	0	-		-		-		21	0
Qingdao Jonoon	2011	Chinese Super League	2	0	0	0	-		-		2	0
Qingdao Jonoon	2012	Chinese Super League	17	0	1	0	-		-		18	0
Qingdao Jonoon	2013	Chinese Super League	18	0	3	0	-		-		21	0
Qingdao Jonoon	2014	China League One	20	2	1	0	-		-		21	2
Qingdao Jonoon	2015	China League One	23	1	2	0	-		-		25	1
Qingdao Jonoon	2016	China League One	16	1	0	0	-		-		16	0
Qingdao Jonoon	Total		117	4	7	0	0	0	0	0	124	4
Shandong Luneng/ Shandong Taishan	2016	Chinese Super League	9	0	0	0	2	0	-		11	0
Shandong Luneng/ Shandong Taishan	2017	Chinese Super League	9	0	4	0	-		-		13	0
Shandong Luneng/ Shandong Taishan	2018	Chinese Super League	6	0	3	0	-		-		9	0
Shandong Luneng/ Shandong Taishan	2019	Chinese Super League	7	0	3	0	2	0	-		12	0
Shandong Luneng/ Shandong Taishan	2020	Chinese Super League	10	0	4	0	-		-		14	0
Shandong Luneng/ Shandong Taishan	2021	Chinese Super League	18	0	6	1	-		-		24	1
Shandong Luneng/ Shandong Taishan	2022	Chinese Super League	19	1	5	2	0	0	-		24	3
Shandong Luneng/ Shandong Taishan	Total		78	1	25	3	4	0	0	0	107	4
Total			195	5	32	3	4	0	0	0	231	8

== Honours ==
=== Club ===
Shandong Luneng/ Shandong Taishan

- Chinese Super League: 2021
- Chinese FA Cup: 2020, 2021, 2022.
