= Liu Zhenli (footballer) =

Chinese footballer

Liu Zhenli 刘震理
Personal information
- Date of birth: June 26, 1985 (age 41)
- Place of birth: Qingdao, Shandong, China
- Height: 1.94 m (6 ft 4 in)
- Position: Goalkeeper

Team information
- Current team: Qingdao Hainiu (goalkeeping coach)

Senior career*
Years	Team	Apps	(Gls)
2004–2015	Qingdao Jonoon	195	(0)
2016–2019	Shandong Luneng	0	(0)
2020–2021	Qingdao FC	26	(0)
2022	Qingdao Youth Island	23	(0)
2023–2024	Qingdao Hainiu	0	(0)

International career
2008	China U23	1	(0)

Managerial career
- 2025–: Qingdao Hainiu (goalkeeping)
- * Club domestic league appearances and goals as of 25 April 2022

Liu Zhenli (simplified Chinese: 刘震理; traditional Chinese: 劉震理; pinyin: Liú Zhènlǐ; born June 26, 1985, in Qingdao, Shandong) is a Chinese football coach and former football goalkeeper. Internationally, he played for the Chinese U-23 team and made the squad that took part in the 2008 Summer Olympics.

== Club career ==
Liu Zhenli started his professional football career at the beginning of the 2004 Chinese Super League season after graduating from the youth team. The following season, he would play understudy to Li Shuai who was injured near the end of the season, which allowed Liu to make his league debut on October 22, 2005, against Tianjin Teda F.C. in a 2–0 defeat. The following season, he would fight for the goalkeeping position with Li Shuai before eventually cementing himself as the first choice goalkeeper at the club in the beginning of the 2007 Chinese Super League season.

On 7 January 2016, Liu transferred to Chinese Super League side Shandong Luneng.

On 18 January 2025, Liu was retired from professional football and became the goalkeeping coach of Qingdao Hainiu.

== International career ==
His impressive performances at the end of the 2007 season saw him called into the Football at the 2008 Summer Olympics – Men's tournament squad where he was second choice goalkeeper. At the tournament he played in the final group game against Brazil which China lost 3–0 as they were knocked out in the group stages.

== Career statistics ==
As of 20 November 2022.

Appearances and goals by club, season and competition
Club	Season	League			National Cup		League Cup		Continental		Total	
Club	Season	Division	Apps	Goals	Apps	Goals	Apps	Goals	Apps	Goals	Apps	Goals
Qingdao Jonoon	2004	Chinese Super League	0	0		0		0	-		0	0
Qingdao Jonoon	2005	Chinese Super League	3	0		0		0	-		3	0
Qingdao Jonoon	2006	Chinese Super League	15	0		0	-		-		15	0
Qingdao Jonoon	2007	Chinese Super League	28	0	-		-		-		28	0
Qingdao Jonoon	2008	Chinese Super League	24	0	-		-		-		24	0
Qingdao Jonoon	2009	Chinese Super League	26	0	-		-		-		26	0
Qingdao Jonoon	2010	Chinese Super League	13	0	-		-		-		13	0
Qingdao Jonoon	2011	Chinese Super League	12	0	0	0	-		-		12	0
Qingdao Jonoon	2012	Chinese Super League	14	0	0	0	-		-		14	0
Qingdao Jonoon	2013	Chinese Super League	11	0	0	0	-		-		11	0
Qingdao Jonoon	2014	China League One	26	0	3	0	-		-		29	0
Qingdao Jonoon	2015	China League One	23	0	0	0	-		-		23	0
Qingdao Jonoon	Total		195	0	3	0	0	0	0	0	198	0
Shandong Luneng	2016	Chinese Super League	0	0	0	0	-		0	0	0	0
Shandong Luneng	2017	Chinese Super League	0	0	1	0	-		-		1	0
Shandong Luneng	2018	Chinese Super League	0	0	0	0	-		-		0	0
Shandong Luneng	2019	Chinese Super League	0	0	0	0	-		0	0	0	0
Shandong Luneng	Total		0	0	1	0	0	0	0	0	1	0
Qingdao Huanghai/ Qingdao	2020	Chinese Super League	15	0	0	0	-		-		15	0
Qingdao Huanghai/ Qingdao	2021	Chinese Super League	11	0	0	0	-		-		11	0
Qingdao Huanghai/ Qingdao	Total		26	0	0	0	0	0	0	0	26	0
Qingdao Youth Island	2022	China League One	23	0	0	0	-		-		23	0
Qingdao Hainiu	2023	Chinese Super League	0	0	0	0	-		-		0	0
Career total			244	0	4	0	0	0	0	0	248	0
