= Jinan Olympic Sports Center Stadium =

Multi-use stadium in Jinan, Shandong, China

- Xiliu
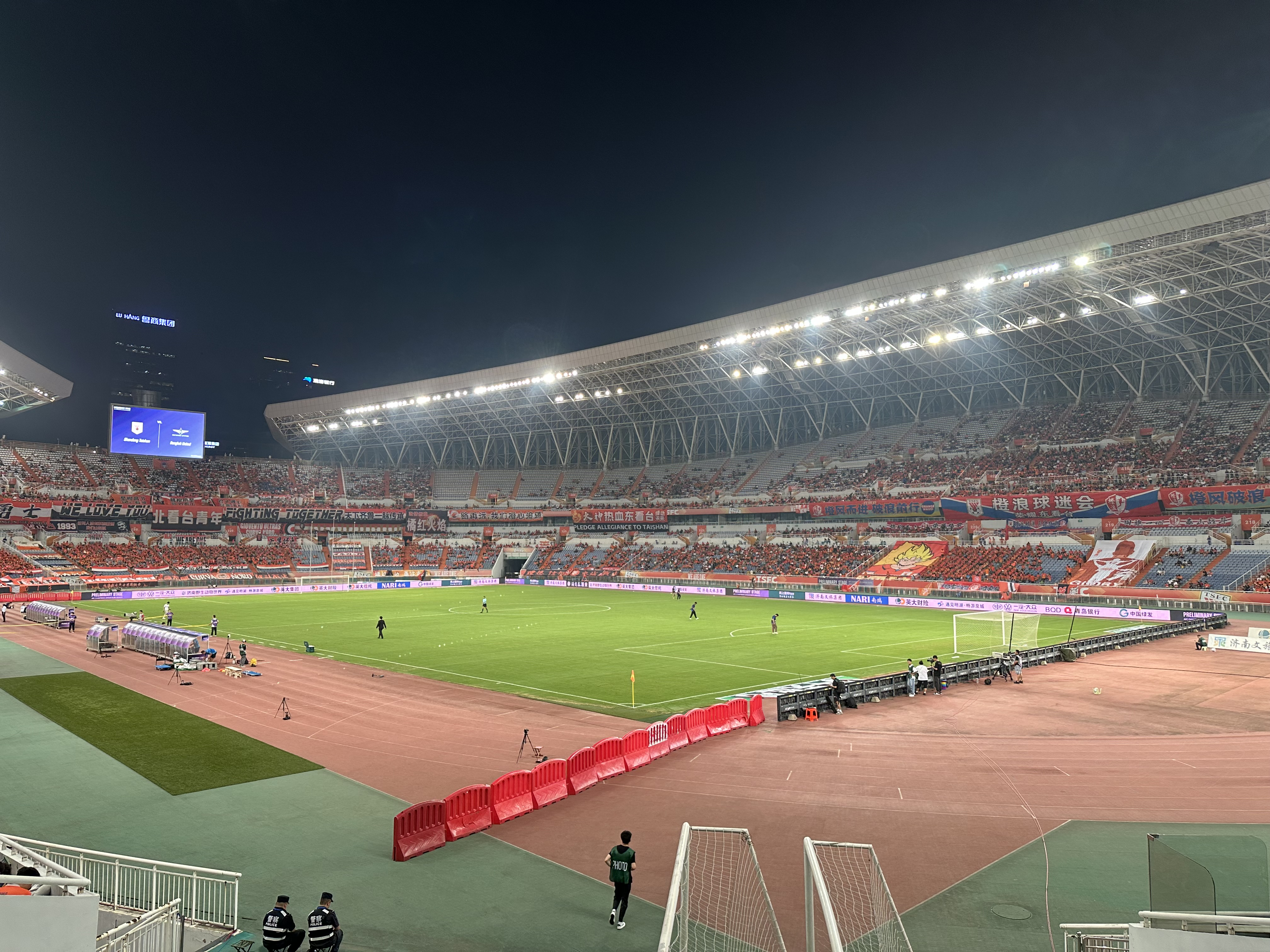
- Interactive map of Jinan Olympic Sports Center Stadium
- Location: Jinan Olympic Sports Center, Jinan, China
- Coordinates: 36.656646°N 117.110052°E
- Owner: Shandong Government
- Capacity: 56,808
- Surface: Grass
- Record attendance: 48,397 (Shandong Taishan vs Beijing Guoan, 9 March 2024)
- Public transit: 3 at Olympic Center

Construction
- Groundbreaking: 28 May 2006
- Opened: 2009
- Cost: ¥ 2.5 billion

Tenant
- Shandong Taishan (2013–present)

The Jinan Olympic Sports Center Stadium (Simplified Chinese: 济南奥林匹克体育中心), a.k.a. the Xiliu (Chinese: 西柳; lit. 'West Willow') is a multi-use stadium in the Jinan Olympic Sports Center in Jinan, China. The stadium was the main venue for the 2009 National Games of China in October 2009 and was used for the opening ceremony, football matches and athletics events. The stadium has a capacity for 56,808 spectators with a construction area of 131,000 square metres and was opened in April 2009.

Preceded by Nanjing Olympic Sports Center; Nanjing	National Games of PRC; Opening and Closing Ceremonies; 2009	Succeeded by Shenyang Olympic Sports Center; Shenyang
