= Hainan Boying F.C. =

Chinese football club

Hainan Boying Hǎinán Bóyíng 海南博盈
- Founded: 2015; 10 years ago
- Dissolved: 28 February 2019; 6 years ago
- Ground: Hainan Sport School Stadium, Haikou
- Capacity: 10,000
- 2018: League Two, 16th

Hainan Boying Football Club was an association football club from Haikou, China, that most recently played in China League Two.

== History ==
Hainan Seamen was founded in 2015 and are among the most successful amateur football clubs in the country. In the same year, they won their local league championship and finished up as runners-up in 2015 China Amateur Football League, gaining promotion to China League Two.

Since 2016, they have been members of the China League Two. Also that year, they changed their name to Hainan Boying & Seamen.

In January 2017, they changed their name again, to Hainan Boying. In Season 2018, it was ranked 16th, which was its best result but could not make it enter the elimination squad of the South District; the club was in financial difficulty and failed to find a new operator and was finally disqualified for the new season on 28 February 2019 for wage arrears.

== Name history ==
- 2015: Hainan Seamen F.C. 海南海汉
- 2016: Hainan Boying & Seamen F.C. 海南博盈海汉
- 2017–2019: Hainan Boying F.C. 海南博盈

== Managerial history ==
- (China) Li Xiao (2015–2016)
- (China) Mai Chao (2017)
- (Portugal) Pedro Rodrigues (2017)
- (China) Zhang Bing (2018)
- (China) Guo Yijun (caretaker) (2018)

== Results ==
All-time league rankings

As of the end of 2018 season.

Year	Div	Pld	W	D	L	GF	GA	GD	Pts	Pos.	FA Cup	Super Cup	AFC	Att./G	Stadium
2015	4									RU	DNQ	DNQ	DNQ		
2016	3	20	6	5	9	20	25	−5	23	17	R3	DNQ	DNQ	1,456	Hainan Sport School Stadium
2017	3	24	6	3	15	15	33	−18	21	22	R1	DNQ	DNQ	975	Hainan Sport School Stadium
2018	3	28	8	9	11	23	32	−9	33	16	R4	DNQ	DNQ	979	Hainan Sport School Stadium

Key

	China top division
	China second division
	China third division
	China fourth division
W	Winners
RU	Runners-up
3	Third place
	Relegated

- Pld = Played
- W = Games won
- D = Games drawn
- L = Games lost
- F = Goals for
- A = Goals against
- Pts = Points
- Pos = Final position
- DNQ = Did not qualify
- DNE = Did not enter
- NH = Not Held
- – = Does Not Exist
- R1 = Round 1
- R2 = Round 2
- R3 = Round 3
- R4 = Round 4
- F = Final
- SF = Semi-finals
- QF = Quarter-finals
- R16 = Round of 16
- Group = Group stage
- GS2 = Second Group stage
- QR1 = First Qualifying Round
- QR2 = Second Qualifying Round
- QR3 = Third Qualifying Round
