= Chinese FA Cup =

- Founded: 1956; 70 years ago (as Chinese National Football Championship); 1995; 31 years ago (current format)
- Region: China
- Domestic cup: Chinese FA Super Cup
- International cup: AFC Champions League Elite
- Current champions: Beijing Guoan (6th title)
- Most championships: Shandong Taishan (8 titles)
- Website: cfacup.com
- 2026 Chinese FA Cup

The Chinese FA Cup (Chinese: 中国足协杯, abbreviated as CFA Cup) is the national knockout cup competition in China organized by the Chinese Football Association. The current holders are Beijing Guoan, having beaten Henan in 2025 for their sixth title.

== History ==
The competition started as the Chinese National Football Championship (Chinese: 全国足球锦标赛) in 1956. It was reorganized after the Cultural Revolution and used the name Chinese FA Cup for the first time in 1984. It was scrapped for the 6th National Games of China in 1987, and was reorganized again as the Chinese National Cup Winners' Cup (Chinese: 全国足球优胜者杯赛) between 1990 and 1992 as the qualifiers for the Asian Cup Winners' Cup.

The current format of the FA Cup began in the 1995 season following the establishment of the professional football league in China. The cup was temporary scrapped in 2007 due to the Chinese Football Association's strategy for the 2008 Summer Olympics, and returned in 2011.

== Cup results ==
=== Non-professional period ===
Season	Winners	Score	Runners-up
1956	Shanghai	3–0	Tianjin
1960	Tianjin	1–0	Guangdong
1984	Liaoning	5–0	Guangdong
1985	Beijing	4–1	Guangdong
1986	Liaoning	1–0	Beijing
1990	Bayi	1–1 (3–0 p)	Dalian
1991	Shanghai	1–0	Guangzhou Baiyun
1992	Dalian	1–1 (4–2 p)	Guangdong

=== Professional period ===
Year	Winners	Score	Runners-up	Venue	Attendance
1995	Jinan Taishan	2–0	Shanghai Shenhua	Wutaishan Stadium, Nanjing	20,000
1996	Beijing Guoan	4–1	Jinan Taishan Jiangjun	Workers Stadium, Beijing	60,000
1997	Beijing Guoan	2–1	Shanghai Shenhua	Workers Stadium, Beijing	60,000
1998	Shanghai Shenhua	2–1	Liaoning	Jinzhou Stadium, Dalian	
1998	Shanghai Shenhua	2–1	Liaoning	Shanghai Stadium, Shanghai	
1998	Shanghai Shenhua won 4–2 on aggregate.				
1999	Shandong Luneng Taishan	1–1	Dalian Wanda Shide	Jinzhou Stadium, Dalian	
1999	Shandong Luneng Taishan	3–2	Dalian Wanda Shide	Shandong Provincial Stadium, Jinan	
1999	Shandong Luneng Taishan won 4–3 on aggregate.				
2000	Chongqing Longxin	0–1	Beijing Guoan	Workers Stadium, Beijing	
2000	Chongqing Longxin	4–1	Beijing Guoan	Datianwan Stadium, Chongqing	
2000	Chongqing Longxin won 4–2 on aggregate.				
2001	Dalian Shide	1–0	Beijing Guoan	Workers Stadium, Beijing	8,000
2001	Dalian Shide	2–1	Beijing Guoan	Dalian People's Stadium, Dalian	25,000
2001	Dalian Shide won 3–1 on aggregate.				
2002	Qingdao Hademen	1–3	Liaoning	Wulihe Stadium, Shenyang	31,000
2002	Qingdao Hademen	2–0	Liaoning	Yizhong Stadium, Qingdao	30,000
2002	Qingdao Hademen won 3–3 on away goals.				
2003	Beijing Guoan	3–0	Dalian Shide	Wulihe Stadium, Shenyang	
2004	Shandong Luneng Taishan	2–1	Sichuan First City	Helong Stadium, Changsha	20,000
2005	Dalian Shide	1–0	Shandong Luneng Taishan	TEDA Football Stadium, Tianjin	
2006	Shandong Luneng Taishan	2–0	Dalian Shide	Helong Stadium, Changsha	
2011	Tianjin TEDA	2–1	Shandong Luneng Taishan	Hefei Olympic Sports Center, Hefei	19,813
2012	Guangzhou Evergrande	1–1	Guizhou Renhe	Guiyang Olympic Sports Center, Guiyang	45,210
2012	Guangzhou Evergrande	4–2	Guizhou Renhe	Tianhe Stadium, Guangzhou	39,989
2012	Guangzhou Evergrande won 5–3 on aggregate.				
2013	Guizhou Renhe	2–0	Guangzhou Evergrande	Guiyang Olympic Sports Center, Guiyang	47,893
2013	Guizhou Renhe	1–2	Guangzhou Evergrande	Tianhe Stadium, Guangzhou	46,898
2013	Guizhou Renhe won 3–2 on aggregate.				
2014	Shandong Luneng Taishan	4–2	Jiangsu Guoxin Sainty	Luneng Stadium, Jinan	31,427
2014	Shandong Luneng Taishan	1–2	Jiangsu Guoxin Sainty	Nanjing Olympic Sports Center, Nanjing	51,262
2014	Shandong Luneng Taishan won 5–4 on aggregate.				
2015	Jiangsu Guoxin Sainty	0–0	Shanghai Greenland Shenhua	Nanjing Olympic Sports Center, Nanjing	53,166
2015	Jiangsu Guoxin Sainty	1–0 (a.e.t.)	Shanghai Greenland Shenhua	Hongkou Football Stadium, Shanghai	25,332
2015	Jiangsu Guoxin Sainty won 1–0 on aggregate.				
2016	Guangzhou Evergrande	1–1	Jiangsu Suning	Tianhe Stadium, Guangzhou	48,562
2016	Guangzhou Evergrande	2–2	Jiangsu Suning	Nanjing Olympic Sports Center, Nanjing	58,331
2016	Guangzhou Evergrande Taobao won 3–3 on away goals.				
2017	Shanghai Greenland Shenhua	1–0	Shanghai SIPG	Hongkou Football Stadium, Shanghai	24,319
2017	Shanghai Greenland Shenhua	2–3	Shanghai SIPG	Shanghai Stadium, Shanghai	39,552
2017	Shanghai Greenland Shenhua won 3–3 on away goals.				
2018	Beijing Sinobo Guoan	1–1	Shandong Luneng Taishan	Workers Stadium, Beijing	48,856
2018	Beijing Sinobo Guoan	2–2	Shandong Luneng Taishan	Luneng Stadium, Jinan	45,666
2018	Beijing Sinobo Guoan won 3–3 on away goals.				
2019	Shandong Luneng Taishan	1–0	Shanghai Greenland Shenhua	Jinan Olympic Sports Center Stadium, Jinan	44,177
2019	Shanghai Greenland Shenhua	3–0	Shandong Luneng Taishan	Hongkou Football Stadium, Shanghai	
2019	Shanghai Greenland Shenhua won 3–1 on aggregate.				
2020	Shandong Luneng Taishan	2–0	Jiangsu Suning	Suzhou Olympic Sports Centre, Suzhou	7,829
2021	Shandong Taishan	1–0	Shanghai Port	Phoenix Hill Sports Park Football Stadium, Chengdu	0
2022	Shandong Taishan	2–1	Zhejiang	Suzhou Olympic Sports Centre, Suzhou	21,079
2023	Shanghai Shenhua	1–0	Shandong Taishan	Suzhou Olympic Sports Centre, Suzhou	31,467
2024	Shanghai Port	3–1	Shandong Taishan	Wenzhou Olympic Sports Center Stadium, Wenzhou	32,022
2025	Beijing Guoan	3–0	Henan	Suzhou Olympic Sports Centre, Suzhou	40,558
2026				Suzhou Olympic Sports Centre, Suzhou	

== Results by team ==
Italics indicates years in the non-professional period.

Rank	Club	Winners	Runners-up
1	Shandong Taishan	8 (1995, 1999, 2004, 2006, 2014, 2020, 2021, 2022)	7 (1996, 2005, 2011, 2018, 2019, 2023, 2024)
2	Shanghai Shenhua	6 (1956, 1991, 1998, 2017, 2019, 2023)	3 (1995, 1997, 2015)
2	Beijing Guoan	6 (1985, 1996, 1997, 2003, 2018, 2025)	3 (1986, 2000, 2001)
4	Dalian Shide	3 (1992, 2001, 2005)	4 (1990, 1999, 2003, 2006)
5	Liaoning	2 (1984, 1986)	2 (1998, 2002)
5	Guangzhou	2 (2012, 2016)	2 (1991, 2013)
7	Tianjin Jinmen Tiger	2 (1960, 2011)	1 (1956)
8	Jiangsu	1 (2015)	3 (2014, 2016, 2020)
9	Shanghai Port	1 (2024)	2 (2017, 2021)
10	Beijing Renhe	1 (2013)	1 (2012)
11	Bayi	1 (1990)	0
11	Chongqing Liangjiang Athletic	1 (2000)	0
11	Qingdao Hainiu	1 (2002)	0
14	Guangdong	0	4 (1960, 1984, 1985, 1992)
15	Sichuan First City	0	1 (2004)
15	Zhejiang	0	1 (2022)
15	Henan	0	1 (2025)

== Awards ==
=== Top goalscorer(s) ===
Season	Top scorer	Club	Goals
1995	(China) Tang Xiaocheng	Jinan Taishan	6
1996	(China) Hu Yunfeng	Bayi	5
1996	(China) Li Bing	Guangdong Winnerway	5
1996	(China) Song Yuming	Jinan Taishan	5
1997	(Spain) Andrés Olivas	Beijing Guoan	4
1997	(Paraguay) Casiano Delvalle	Beijing Guoan	4
1997	(China) Nan Fang	Beijing Guoan	4
1997	(Denmark) Riffi Haddaoui	Guangzhou Apollo	4
1998	(China) Wang Tao	Dalian Wanda	7
1998	(China) Zhang Yuning	Liaoning F.C.	7
1999	(South Africa) Mark Williams	Chongqing Huandao	6
2000	(Bulgaria) Milen Georgiev	Chongqing Longxin	7
2001	(Brazil) Orlando	Dalian Shide	7
2002	(Colombia) John Jairo Tréllez	Zhejiang Greentown	4
2002	(China) Li Jinyu	Liaoning F.C.	4
2002	(Brazil) Marcos	Shenzhen Ping'an	4
2003	(Ukraine) Serhiy Nahornyak	Shandong Luneng Taishan	5
2004	(Sweden) Daniel Nannskog	Sichuan Guancheng	9
2005	(China) Zou Jie	Dalian Shide	7
2006	(China) Han Peng	Shandong Luneng Taishan	5
2011	(Brazil) Muriqui	Guangzhou Evergrande	4
2012	(Spain) Rafa Jordà	Guizhou Renhe	6
2013	(Nigeria) Peter Utaka	Beijing Guoan	4
2014	(China) Xiao Zhi	Henan Jianye	5
2015	(Senegal) Demba Ba	Shanghai Greenland Shenhua	6
2016	(Nigeria) Obafemi Martins	Shanghai Greenland Shenhua	6
2016	(Israel) Eran Zahavi	Guangzhou R&F	6
2016	(Brazil) Alex Teixeira	Jiangsu Suning	6
2017	(Nigeria) Obafemi Martins	Shanghai Greenland Shenhua	6
2018	(Spain) Jonathan Viera	Beijing Sinobo Guoan	5

=== Most Valuable Player ===
Season	Player	Club
1995	(China) Fan Zhiyi	Shanghai Shenhua
1996	(China) Su Maozhen	Jinan Taishan
1997	(China) Shen Si	Shanghai Shenhua
1998	(China) Hao Haidong	Dalian Wanda
1999	(China) Su Maozhen	Shandong Luneng Taishan
2000	(China) Wang Tao	Beijing Guoan
2011	(China) Yu Dabao	Tianjin Teda
2012	(Paraguay) Lucas Barrios	Guangzhou Evergrande
2013	(Argentina) Darío Conca	Guangzhou Evergrande
2014	(Australia) Ryan McGowan	Shandong Luneng Taishan
2015	(Senegal) Demba Ba	Shanghai Greenland Shenhua
2016	(Colombia) Roger Martínez	Jiangsu Suning
2017	(China) Cao Yunding	Shanghai Greenland Shenhua
2018	(China) Zhang Xizhe	Beijing Sinobo Guoan

=== Best Coach ===
Season	Coach	Club
2012	(Italy) Marcello Lippi	Guangzhou Evergrande
2013	(China) Gong Lei	Guizhou Renhe
2014	(China) Gao Hongbo	Jiangsu Sainty
2015	(Romania) Dan Petrescu	Jiangsu Guoxin-Sainty
2016	(Brazil) Luiz Felipe Scolari	Guangzhou Evergrande Taobao
2017	No award	
2018	No award	

=== Fair Play Award ===
Season	Club
2011	Shandong Luneng Taishan
2012	Shandong Luneng Taishan
2013	Guizhou Renhe
2014	Qingdao Hainiu
2015	Xinjiang Tianshan Leopard
2016	Guangzhou R&F
2017	Shanghai Shenxin
2018	Sichuan Jiuniu

=== Dark Horse Award ===
Season	Club
1995	Guangzhou Matsunichi
1996	Shanghai Pudong
1997	Shanghai Yuyuan
1998	Liaoning FC
1999	Yunnan Hongta
2000	Wuhan Hongtao K
2014	Wuhan Hongxing
2015	Xinjiang Tianshan Leopard
2016	Tianjin Quanjian
2017	Shanghai Shenxin
2018	Shenyang Urban

== Sponsors ==
Sponsorships
Season	Sponsor	Annual value	Official name
1995–2000	Philips		Philips China FA Cup
2001	Mexin Doors	¥10 million	Mexin Doors China FA Cup
2002	Fujifilm	¥7 million	Fujifilm China FA Cup
2003	Blue Ribbon Beer	¥8 million	Blue Ribbon Beer China FA Cup
2004	Blue Ribbon Beer	¥4.5 million	Blue Ribbon Beer China FA Cup
2005–2006	No sponsor		
2011–2013	Toshiba	¥10 million	Toshiba CFA Cup
2014–2022	Yanjing Beer	¥20 million	Yanjing Beer CFA Cup

== See also ==
- Football in China
- List of Chinese football champions
