= 2019 Lunar New Year Cup =

2019 Lunar New Year Cup 豬年賀歲盃
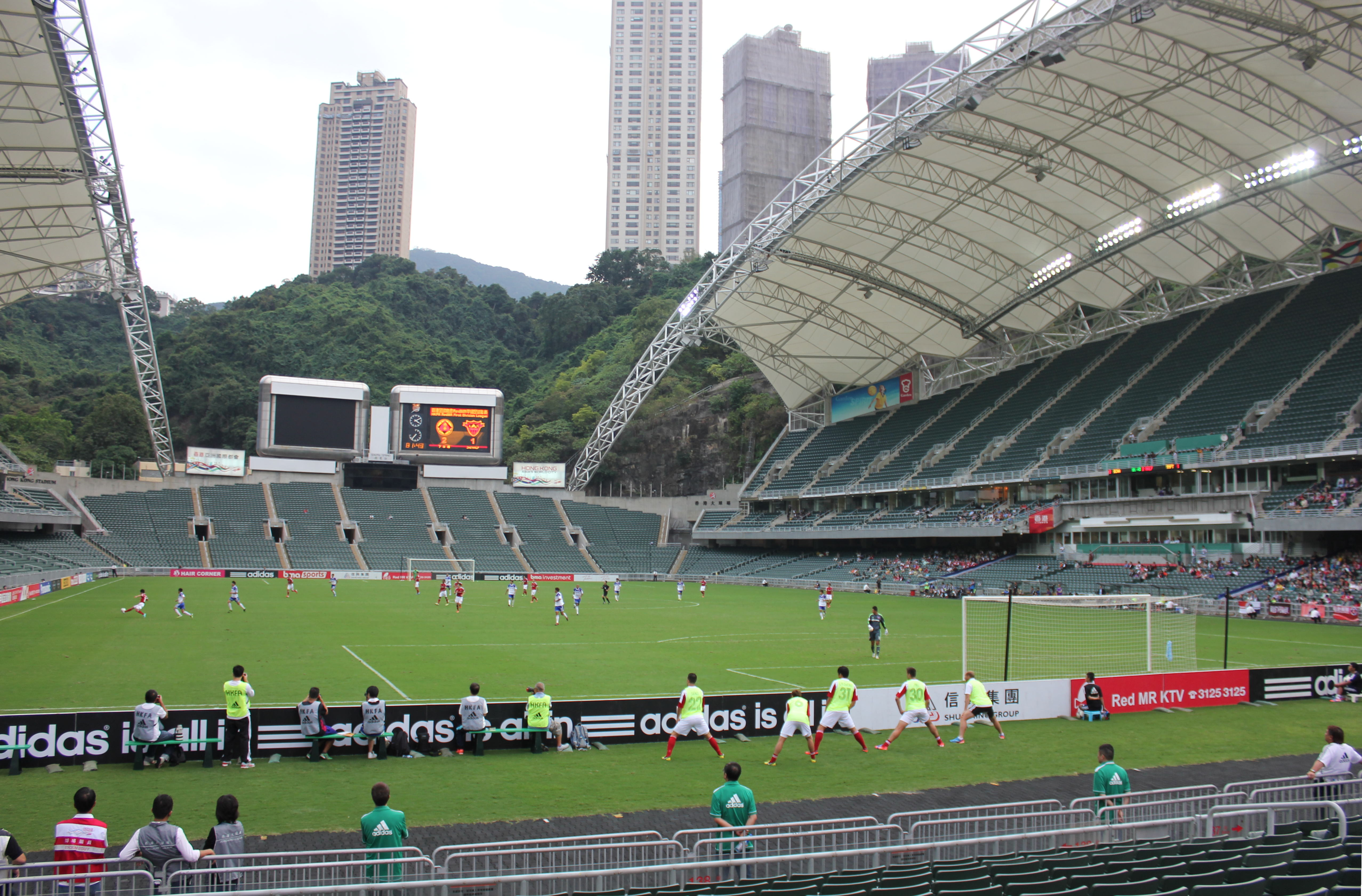
- The Hong Kong Stadium hosted the tournament

Tournament details
- Dates: 19–21 February 2019
- Teams: 4 (from 2 confederations)

Final positions
- Champions: (China) Shandong Luneng (1st title)
- Runners-up: (Japan) Sagan Tosu

Tournament statistics
- Matches played: 4

The 93rd 2019 Lunar New Year Cup (Chinese: 豬年賀歲盃; literally: "Year of the Pig Celebrate New Year Cup") was the annual edition of the Lunar New Year Cup, held in Hong Kong to celebrate the Lunar New Year in early February 2019. This year, four teams were invited to participate, playing two games each in a knockout tournament.

== Format ==
The two semi-finals for the four participating teams were held on the first day of the Lunar New Year of Pig (5 February 2019). The winning teams entered the final and the losing teams play the third-place playoff (Both matches on the third day of the Lunar New Year, i.e. 7 February.) Draw in the semi-finals and third-place playoff were settled by penalty shootout directly, that means no extra time would be played. For the final, a thirty-minute extra time would be played after a draw. A further draw would lead to the penalty shootout.

== Teams ==
Four teams were invited to participate:

- (Hong Kong) HK LNY Selection Team (hosts)
- (Japan) Sagan Tosu
- (New Zealand) Auckland City
- (China) Shandong Luneng

== Squads ==
=== HK LNY Selection Team ===
Manager: (England) Kevin Bond：

No.	Pos.	Player	Date of birth (age)	Caps	Club
1	GK	(Hong Kong) Leung Hing Kit	22 October 1989 (aged 29)		(Hong Kong) Pegasus
36	GK	(China) Zhang Chunhui	13 March 1983 (aged 35)		(Hong Kong) Pegasus
14	DF	(England) Jack Sealy	4 May 1987 (aged 31)		(Hong Kong) Pegasus
16	DF	(Hong Kong) Law Hiu Chung	10 June 1995 (aged 23)		(Hong Kong) Pegasus
19	DF	(Bulgaria) Rosen Kolev	4 July 1990 (aged 28)		(Hong Kong) Pegasus
21	DF	(Hong Kong) Cheung Chi Yung	30 June 1989 (aged 29)		(Hong Kong) Pegasus
3	DF	(Brazil) David Lazari	30 April 1989 (aged 29)		(Hong Kong) Pegasus
6	DF	(Hong Kong) Leung Nok Hang	14 November 1994 (aged 24)		(Hong Kong) R&F
12	DF	(Hong Kong) Lo Kwan Yee	9 October 1984 (aged 34)		(Hong Kong) R&F
24	DF	(Hong Kong) Fong Pak Lun	14 April 1993 (aged 25)		(Hong Kong) Lee Man
5	DF	(Spain) Fran González	1 February 1989 (aged 30)		(Hong Kong) Lee Man
20	MF	(Brazil) Juninho	11 December 1990 (aged 28)		(Hong Kong) Pegasus
8	MF	(Cameroon) Mahama Awal	10 June 1991 (aged 27)		(Hong Kong) Pegasus
15	MF	(Japan) Shu Sasaki	12 February 1991 (aged 27)		(Hong Kong) Pegasus
13	MF	(Hong Kong) Wong Chun Ho	31 May 1990 (aged 28)		(Hong Kong) Pegasus
22	MF	(Hong Kong) Wu Chun Ming	21 November 1997 (aged 21)		(Hong Kong) Pegasus
17	MF	(Brazil) Fernando	14 November 1986 (aged 32)		(Hong Kong) Kitchee
18	MF	(Spain) Jordi Tarrés	16 March 1981 (aged 37)		(Hong Kong) Kitchee
11	MF	(Hong Kong) Cheng Siu Kwan	13 January 1997 (aged 22)		(Hong Kong) Lee Man
4	MF	(Brazil) Cleiton	9 December 1986 (aged 32)		(Hong Kong) Yuen Long
2	MF	(Spain) Marcos Gondra	1 January 1987 (aged 32)		(Hong Kong) Dreams FC
9	FW	(Australia) Travis Major	18 February 1990 (aged 28)		(Hong Kong) Pegasus
7	FW	(Hong Kong) Chan Siu Ki	14 July 1985 (aged 33)		(Hong Kong) Pegasus
10	FW	(Hong Kong) Yuen Chun Sing	16 February 1993 (aged 25)		(Hong Kong) Pegasus
23	FW	(Brazil) Souza	7 September 1989 (aged 29)		(Hong Kong) Southern
25	FW	(Brazil) Jean Moser	23 June 1993 (aged 25)		(Hong Kong) Yuen Long

=== Sagan Tosu ===
Manager: (Spain) Lluís Carreras

Note: Flags indicate national team as defined under FIFA eligibility rules; some limited exceptions apply. Players may hold more than one non-FIFA nationality.

No.	Pos.	Nation	Player
1	GK	JPN	Takuo Ōkubo
2	DF	JPN	Hiromu Mitsumaru
3	DF	JPN	Yuji Takahashi
4	MF	JPN	Riki Harakawa
5	DF	CRO	Nino Galović
6	MF	JPN	Akito Fukuta
7	MF	ESP	Isaac Cuenca
9	FW	ESP	Fernando Torres
11	FW	JPN	Yohei Toyoda
13	DF	JPN	Yuzo Kobayashi
14	MF	JPN	Yoshiki Takahashi
16	MF	JPN	Yatsunori Shimaya
18	GK	JPN	Yohei Takaoka
19	FW	KOR	Cho Dong-geon
21	GK	KOR	Kim Min-ho

No.	Pos.	Nation	Player
22	MF	JPN	Teruki Hara
24	DF	JPN	Kazuki Anzai
25	MF	KOR	An Yong-woo
26	MF	JPN	Ryoya Ito
28	MF	JPN	Hiroto Ishikawa
29	MF	JPN	Hiroyuki Taniguchi
30	MF	JPN	Yuta Higuchi
32	FW	COL	Víctor Ibarbo
33	FW	JPN	Kaisei Ishii
35	DF	JPN	Masato Fujita
36	MF	JPN	Hideto Takahashi
40	FW	JPN	Yuji Ono
41	MF	JPN	Daiki Matsuoka
42	GK	JPN	Yosei Itahashi
44	MF	JPN	Mu Kanazaki

=== Auckland City ===
Manager: (Spain) Ramon Tribulietx

Note: Flags indicate national team as defined under FIFA eligibility rules; some limited exceptions apply. Players may hold more than one non-FIFA nationality.

No.	Pos.	Nation	Player
1	GK	ESP	Eñaut Zubikarai
2	DF	NZL	Hayden McHenery
3	DF	JPN	Takuya Iwata
4	DF	CRO	Mario Bilen
5	DF	ESP	Ángel Berlanga (captain)
6	DF	VAN	Brian Kaltack
7	MF	NZL	Cameron Howieson
8	MF	ESP	Albert Riera
9	FW	ESP	Javier López Iglesias
10	MF	SOL	Micah Lea'alafa
11	MF	MEX	Fabrizio Tavano
12	FW	NZL	Dylan Manickum

No.	Pos.	Nation	Player
13	FW	SWE	Patrick Lundemo
14	MF	NZL	Jordan Vale
15	MF	NZL	Dan Morgan
16	FW	NZL	Yousif Ali Al-Khalisy
17	MF	NZL	Reid Drake
18	GK	NZL	Ruben Parker
19	FW	PNG	David Browne
20	MF	NZL	Te Atawhai Hudson-Wihongi
21	FW	COK	Maro Bonsu-Maro
22	MF	COL	Omar Guardiola
23	DF	NZL	Alfie Rogers
24	GK	NZL	Cameron Brown

=== Shandong Luneng Taishan F.C. ===
Manager: (China) Li Xiaopeng

Note: Flags indicate national team as defined under FIFA eligibility rules; some limited exceptions apply. Players may hold more than one non-FIFA nationality.

No.	Pos.	Nation	Player
1	GK	CHN	Liu Zhenli
2	DF	CHN	Li Songyi
3	DF	CHN	Liu Junshuai
4	DF	BRA	Gil
5	DF	CHN	Zheng Zheng
6	DF	CHN	Wang Tong
7	MF	CHN	Cui Peng
11	DF	CHN	Liu Yang
13	MF	CHN	Zhang Chi
14	GK	CHN	Wang Dalei
15	MF	CHN	Li Wei
16	MF	CHN	Zhou Haibin
17	FW	CHN	Wu Xinghan
19	FW	ITA	Graziano Pellè
20	GK	CHN	Han Rongze

No.	Pos.	Nation	Player
21	MF	CHN	Liu Binbin
22	MF	CHN	Hao Junmin
23	MF	CHN	Song Long
24	DF	CHN	Qi Tianyu
27	MF	CHN	Cao Sheng
28	MF	CHN	Yao Junsheng
29	FW	CHN	Cheng Yuan
30	DF	CHN	Chen Zhechao
32	FW	BRA	Róger Guedes (on loan from Palmeiras)
33	MF	CHN	Jin Jingdao
34	DF	CHN	Li Hailong
35	DF	CHN	Dai Lin
45	MF	CHN	Tian Xin
47	DF	CHN	Zhao Jianfei
53	MF	CHN	Duan Liuyu

== Fixtures and results ==
All times are local, HKT (UTC+8).

Semi-finals
6 January
(Hong Kong) HK LNY Selection Team	1 (2)
(Japan) Sagan Tosu (pen.)	1 (4)
6 January
(China) Shandong Luneng	2
(New Zealand) Auckland City	1

Final
8 January
(Japan) Sagan Tosu	1
(China) Shandong Luneng	3
Third place
8 January
(Hong Kong) HK LNY Selection Team	1
(New Zealand) Auckland City	0

=== Semi-finals ===
6 January 2019
16:00

Shandong Luneng (China)	2–1	(New Zealand) Auckland City
Róger Guedes 57', 88'	Report	Micah Lea'alafa 46'

Hong Kong Stadium, Hong Kong
Attendance: 14,502
Referee: Ng Chiu Kok

6 January 2019
18:15

HK LNY Selection Team (Hong Kong)	1–1	(Japan) Sagan Tosu
Juninho 76'	Report	Fernando Torres 39'
Penalties
Marcos Gondra (penalty scored); Lo Kwan Yee (penalty scored); David Lazari (penalty missed); Souza (penalty missed)	2–4	(penalty scored) Ryoya Ito; (penalty scored) Riki Harakawa; (penalty scored) Kazuki Anzai; (penalty scored) Masato Fujita

Hong Kong Stadium, Hong Kong
Attendance: 14,502
Referee: Tam Ping Wun

=== Third place play-off ===
8 January 2019
16:00

HK LNY Selection Team (Hong Kong)	1–0	(New Zealand) Auckland City
Mahama Awal 41'	Report	Fabrizio Tavano (penalty missed)

Hong Kong Stadium, Hong Kong
Attendance: 21,643
Referee: Ho Wai Sing

=== Final ===
8 January 2019
18:15

Sagan Tosu (Japan)	1–3	(China) Shandong Luneng
Fernando Torres 59'	Report	Gil 3'; Graziano Pellè 50'; Pedro Delgado 81'

Hong Kong Stadium, Hong Kong
Attendance: 21,643
Referee: Liu Kwok Man

2019 Lunar New Year Champions

Shandong Luneng
First time

== See also ==
- Hong Kong Football Association
- Hong Kong Premier League
