= 2019 Shandong Luneng Taishan F.C. season =

Shandong Luneng Taishan
2019 season
- Manager: Li Xiaopeng
- Stadium: Jinan Olympic Sports Center Stadium
- Super League: 5th
- FA Cup: Runners-up
- AFC Champions League: Round of 16
- Top goalscorer: League: Graziano Pellè (17); All: Graziano Pellè (27)

The 2019 Shandong Luneng Taishan F.C. season was Shandong Luneng Taishan's 16th consecutive season in the Chinese Super League, since the competition started with the 2004 season, and 26th consecutive season in the top flight of Chinese football overall. Shandong Luneng Taishan competed in the Chinese Super League, Chinese FA Cup and AFC Champions League.

== Squad ==
=== First team squad ===
As of 1 March 2019

Note: Flags indicate national team as defined under FIFA eligibility rules; some limited exceptions apply. Players may hold more than one non-FIFA nationality.

No.	Pos.	Nation	Player
1	GK	CHN	Liu Zhenli
3	DF	CHN	Liu Junshuai
4	DF	BRA	Gil
5	DF	CHN	Zheng Zheng
6	DF	CHN	Wang Tong
7	MF	CHN	Cui Peng
9	FW	ITA	Graziano Pellè
11	DF	CHN	Liu Yang
13	MF	CHN	Zhang Chi
14	GK	CHN	Wang Dalei
16	DF	CHN	Li Hailong
17	FW	CHN	Wu Xinghan
18	MF	CHN	Zhou Haibin
20	GK	CHN	Han Rongze
21	MF	CHN	Liu Binbin

No.	Pos.	Nation	Player
22	MF	CHN	Hao Junmin (Captain)
23	FW	BRA	Róger Guedes
24	DF	CHN	Qi Tianyu
25	MF	BEL	Marouane Fellaini
28	MF	CHN	Chen Kerui
29	FW	CHN	Cheng Yuan
31	DF	CHN	Zhao Jianfei
32	MF	CHN	Tian Xin
33	MF	CHN	Jin Jingdao
34	MF	CHN	Huang Cong
35	DF	CHN	Dai Lin
36	MF	CHN	Duan Liuyu
38	FW	CHN	Liu Chaoyang
39	MF	CHN	Song Long
40	GK	CHN	Li Guanxi

=== Reserve squad ===
As of 16 July 2018

Note: Flags indicate national team as defined under FIFA eligibility rules; some limited exceptions apply. Players may hold more than one non-FIFA nationality.

No.	Pos.	Nation	Player
2	DF	CHN	Li Songyi
15	MF	CHN	Li Wei
19	FW	CHN	Song Wenjie
27	MF	CHN	Cao Sheng
30	DF	CHN	Chen Zhechao
41	MF	CHN	Zhang Chen
44	MF	CHN	Cheng Pu
46	MF	CHN	Hao Haiyi
48	DF	CHN	Yu Chenglei
49	DF	CHN	Zhang Dapeng
50	MF	CHN	Abdursul Abudulam
55	MF	CHN	Zhou Zehao
56	MF	CHN	Zeng Yuming
58	DF	CHN	Zhou Shun
59	MF	CHN	Ma Shuai

No.	Pos.	Nation	Player
60	DF	CHN	Wang Ruiqi
61	MF	CHN	Zhang Yuanshu
—	DF	CHN	Gao Xin
—	DF	CHN	Chen Guoliang
—	DF	CHN	Liao Lei
—	DF	CHN	Wu Lei
—	MF	CHN	Liu Li
—	MF	CHN	Yang Yilin
—	MF	CHN	Xu Anbang
—	MF	CHN	Sun Rui
—	MF	CHN	Sun Yi
—	MF	POR	Pedro Delgado
—	MF	CHN	Luo Andong
—	FW	CHN	Ji Shengpan

== Squad statistics ==
=== Appearances and goals ===
As of 1 March 2019

No.	Pos	Nat	Player	Total		Super League		FA Cup		AFC Champions League	
No.	Pos	Nat	Player	Apps	Goals	Apps	Goals	Apps	Goals	Apps	Goals
1	GK	(China) CHN	Liu Zhenli	0	0	0	0	0	0	0	0
3	DF	(China) CHN	Liu Junshuai	2	1	1	0	0	0	1	1
4	DF	(Brazil) BRA	Gil	2	0	1	0	0	0	1	0
5	DF	(China) CHN	Zheng Zheng	0	0	0	0	0	0	0	0
6	DF	(China) CHN	Wang Tong	2	0	1	0	0	0	1	0
7	MF	(China) CHN	Cui Peng	1	0	0	0	0	0	1	0
9	FW	(Italy) ITA	Graziano Pellè	2	1	1	0	0	0	1	1
11	DF	(China) CHN	Liu Yang	1	0	1	0	0	0	0	0
13	MF	(China) CHN	Zhang Chi	2	0	1	0	0	0	1	0
14	GK	(China) CHN	Wang Dalei	2	0	1	0	0	0	1	0
16	DF	(China) CHN	Li Hailong	0	0	0	0	0	0	0	0
17	FW	(China) CHN	Wu Xinghan	2	0	1	0	0	0	1	0
18	MF	(China) CHN	Zhou Haibin	1	1	0	0	0	0	1	1
20	GK	(China) CHN	Han Rongze	0	0	0	0	0	0	0	0
21	MF	(China) CHN	Liu Binbin	1	1	0	0	0	0	1	1
22	MF	(China) CHN	Hao Junmin	2	0	1	0	0	0	1	0
23	FW	(Brazil) BRA	Róger Guedes	1	0	0	0	0	0	1	0
24	DF	(China) CHN	Qi Tianyu	0	0	0	0	0	0	0	0
25	MF	(Belgium) BEL	Marouane Fellaini	1	1	1	1	0	0	0	0
28	MF	(China) CHN	Chen Kerui	0	0	0	0	0	0	0	0
29	FW	(China) CHN	Cheng Yuan	0	0	0	0	0	0	0	0
31	DF	(China) CHN	Zhao Jianfei	0	0	0	0	0	0	0	0
32	MF	(China) CHN	Tian Xin	0	0	0	0	0	0	0	0
33	MF	(China) CHN	Jin Jingdao	2	0	1	0	0	0	1	0
34	MF	(China) CHN	Huang Cong	0	0	0	0	0	0	0	0
35	DF	(China) CHN	Dai Lin	2	0	1	0	0	0	1	0
36	MF	(China) CHN	Duan Liuyu	1	0	1	0	0	0	0	0
38	FW	(China) CHN	Liu Chaoyang	1	0	1	0	0	0	0	0
39	MF	(China) CHN	Song Long	0	0	0	0	0	0	0	0
40	GK	(China) CHN	Li Guanxi	0	0	0	0	0	0	0	0
Players transferred out during the season

=== Disciplinary record ===
As of match played unknown

No.	Pos	Nat	Player	Super League			FA Cup			FA Super Cup			AFC Champions League			Total		
No.	Pos	Nat	Player	Yellow card	Second yellow card	Red card	Yellow card	Second yellow card	Red card	Yellow card	Second yellow card	Red card	Yellow card	Second yellow card	Red card	Yellow card	Second yellow card	Red card
				0	0	0	0	0	0	0	0	0	0	0	0	0	0	0
Total				0	0	0	0	0	0	0	0	0	0	0	0	0	0	0

== Friendlies ==
=== Pre-season ===
5 February 2019 2019 Lunar New Year Cup	Shandong Luneng (China)	2–1	(New Zealand) Auckland City	Hong Kong
16:00 UTC+8	Róger Guedes 57', 88'	Report	Micah Lea'alafa 46'	Stadium: Hong Kong Stadium; Attendance: 14,502; Referee: Ng Chiu Kok

7 February 2019 2019 Lunar New Year Cup	Sagan Tosu (Japan)	1–3	(China) Shandong Luneng	Hong Kong
18:15 UTC+8	Fernando Torres 59'	Report	Gil 3'; Graziano Pellè 50'; Pedro Delgado 81'	Stadium: Hong Kong Stadium; Attendance: 21,643; Referee: Liu Kwok Man

== Competitions ==
=== Chinese Super League ===
==== Table ====
Pos	Team	Pld	W	D	L	GF	GA	GD	Pts	Qualification or relegation
3	Shanghai SIPG	30	20	6	4	62	26	+36	66	Qualification for AFC Champions League play-off round
4	Jiangsu Suning	30	15	8	7	60	41	+19	53	
5	Shandong Luneng Taishan	30	15	6	9	55	35	+20	51	
6	Wuhan Zall	30	12	8	10	41	41	0	44	
7	Tianjin TEDA	30	12	5	13	43	45	−2	41 (Note: Head-to-head results: Henan Jianye 2–3 Tianjin TEDA, Tianjin TEDA 2–0 Henan Jianye.)	

Source: CSL
Rules for classification:
- During season: 1) Points; 2) Goal difference; 3) Goals scored.
- After season: 1) Points; 2) Head-to-head points; 3) Head-to-head goal difference; 4) Head-to-head goals scored; 5) Scores of the weight ratio of the reserve league and youth leagues.
  Notes:

==== Results summary ====
Overall								Home						Away					
Pld	W	D	L	GF	GA	GD	Pts	W	D	L	GF	GA	GD	W	D	L	GF	GA	GD
27	13	6	8	48	31	+17	45	8	3	2	24	12	+12	5	3	6	24	19	+5

Last updated: 27 October 2019.
Source: League table

==== Results by round ====
Round	1	2	3	4	5	6	7	8	9	10	11	12	13	14	15	16	17	18	19	20	21	22	23	24	25	26	27	28	29	30
Ground	H	H	A	A	H	A	H	H	A	A	H	H	A	A	H	A	A	H	H	A	H	A	A	H	H	A	A	H	H	A
Result	W	D	W	D	L	L	W	W	L	W	W	D	D	L	W	W	L	W	W	L	L	W	L	W	D	W	D			
Position	6	5	4	4	6	7	5	4	5	4	4	4	4	4	4	4	4	4	4	4	4	4	4	4	4	4	4			

Updated to match(es) played on 27 October 2019. Source: Competitive matches
A = Away; H = Home; W = Win; D = Draw; L = Loss

==== Matches ====
All times are local (UTC+8).

1 March 2019 1	Shandong Luneng Taishan	1–0	Beijing Renhe	Jinan
18:00	Fellaini 50'	Report (CSL); Report (Sina Sports)		Stadium: Jinan Olympic Sports Center Stadium; Attendance: 20,107

9 March 2019 2	Shandong Luneng Taishan	2–2	Henan Jianye	Jinan
19:30 UTC+8	Róger Guedes 29' 53'	Summary	Bassogog 25'; Ivo (yellow card) 75' (goal) 81' (pen.); Wu Yan (yellow card) 90+6'	Stadium: Jinan Olympic Sports Center Stadium; Attendance: 25,066; Referee: Fu Ming

31 March 2019 3	Tianjin Tianhai	2–4	Shandong Luneng Taishan	Tianjin
16:30	Zheng Dalun 36'; Zhang Cheng (yellow card) 44'; Yang Xu 90+1'	Summary	Wu Xinghan 7'; Li Hailong (yellow card) 51'; Pellè 61' (pen.); Zhou Haibin 64'; Zhang Chi 68'; Dai Lin (yellow card) 74'	Stadium: Tianjin Olympic Center Stadium; Attendance: 31,317; Referee: (England) Mark Clattenburg

5 April 2019 4	Shenzhen F.C.	1–1	Shandong Luneng Taishan	Shenzhen
20:35	Lü Haidong (yellow card) 19'; Selnæs 49'	Report	Liu Yang (yellow card) 31'; Pellè 61'	Stadium: Shenzhen Universiade Sports Centre; Attendance: 20,198; Referee: (China) Wang Zhe

14 April 2019 5	Shandong Luneng Taishan	0–1	Dalian Yifang	Jinan
18:30 UTC+8		Report	Carrasco (yellow card) 15'; Mushekwi 44'; Zhu Xiaogang (yellow card) 52'; Li Shuai (yellow card) 56' (yellow-red card) 76'; He Yupeng (yellow card) 90+5'	Stadium: Jinan Olympic Sports Center Stadium; Attendance: 22,175; Referee: (China) Ma Ning (referee)

19 April 2019 6	Guangzhou Evergrande Taobao	2–1	Shandong Luneng Taishan	Guangzhou
20:35	Talisca 19' 90+5'; Zhang Xiuwei (yellow card) 59'	Report	Pellè 44'; Chen Kerui (yellow card) 61'; Fellaini (yellow card) 68'	Stadium: Tianhe Stadium; Attendance: 43,986; Referee: (Serbia) Milorad Mažić

28 April 2019 7	Shandong Luneng Taishan	3–0	Wuhan Zall	Jinan
19:35	Pellè 7' 43' 90'; Dai Lin (yellow card) 69'	Report		Stadium: Jinan Olympic Sports Center Stadium; Attendance: 15,316; Referee: (China) Wang Zhe

4 May 2019 8	Shandong Luneng Taishan	2–0	Hebei China Fortune	Jinan
20:35	Pellè 12' 23' (pen.)	Report		Stadium: Jinan Olympic Sports Center Stadium; Attendance: 20,135; Referee: (China) Huang Yejun

12 May 2019 9	Shanghai SIPG	2–1	Shandong Luneng Taishan	Shanghai
20:35	Wei Zhen (yellow card) 70' (yellow-red card) 71'; Elkeson 74'; Zhang Wei (yellow card) 78'; Hulk 90+11' (pen.) (yellow card) 90+11'	Report	Róger Guedes 1'; Chen Kerui (yellow card) 37'; Hao Junmin (yellow card) 90+2'; Gil (yellow card) 90+9'	Stadium: Shanghai Stadium; Attendance: 22,093; Referee: (Serbia) Milorad Mažić

17 May 2019 10	Shanghai Greenland Shenhua	1–3	Shandong Luneng Taishan	Shanghai
21:00	Moreno 23'; N'Doumbou (yellow card) 54'	Report	Pellè 15'; Gil 58'; Fellaini 75'	Stadium: Hongkou Football Stadium; Attendance: 20,746; Referee: (England) Mark Clattenburg

26 May 2019 11	Shandong Luneng Taishan	3–1	Guangzhou R&F	Jinan
20:35 UTC+8	Fellaini 33'; Gil 61'; Hao Junmin 67'	Report	Zahavi 55'	Stadium: Jinan Olympic Sports Center Stadium; Attendance: 20,520; Referee: (Australia) Kurt Ams

1 June 2019 12	Shandong Luneng Taishan	1–1	Jiangsu Suning	Jinan
20:35	Qi Tianyu (yellow card) 34'; Pellè 65' (pen.) (yellow card) 90+4'; Song Long (yellow card) 67'; Zhou Haibin (yellow card) 68'; Wang Dalei (yellow card) 90+3'	Report	Ye Chongqiu (yellow card) 36'; Li Ang (yellow card) 61'; Éder (yellow card) 61' (goal) 81'; Feng Boyuan (yellow card) 90+2'; Alex Teixeira (yellow card) 90+3'	Stadium: Jinan Olympic Sports Center Stadium; Attendance: 26,384; Referee: (New Zealand) Matthew Conger

14 June 2019 13	Chongqing Siwei	1–1	Shandong Luneng Taishan	Chongqing
20:35 UTC+8	Dilmurat Mawlanyaz (yellow card) 56'; Alan Kardec 68'	Report	Zhang Chi (yellow card) 38'; Wu Xinghan (yellow card) 75'; Róger Guedes (yellow card) 90+8'; Pellè 90+10' (pen.)	Stadium: Chongqing Olympic Sports Center; Attendance: 32,186; Referee: (China) Ma Ning (referee)

22 June 2019 14	Tianjin Teda	2–1	Shandong Luneng Taishan	Tianjin
20:35	Wagner 15' 67'; Tan Wangsong (red card) 71'	Report	Liu Junshuai (yellow card) 58'; Fellaini (red card) 79'; Róger Guedes 90+6'	Stadium: Tianjin Olympic Center Stadium; Attendance: 28,438; Referee: (China) Li Haixin

30 June 2019 15	Shandong Luneng Taishan	2–0	Beijing Sinobo Guoan	Jinan
20:35	Cui Peng (yellow card) 13'; Pedro Delgado (yellow card) 17'; Róger Guedes 28' 30'; Wang Dalei (yellow card) 90+2'	Report		Stadium: Jinan Olympic Sports Center Stadium; Attendance: 38,219; Referee: (England) Mark Clattenburg

7 July 2019 16	Beijing Renhe	0–2	Shandong Luneng Taishan	Beijing
20:35	Cao Yongjing (yellow card) 76'	Report	Pedro Delgado (yellow card) 49'; Pellè 64'; Dai Lin (yellow card) 78' (yellow-red card) 83'; Róger Guedes 87'	Stadium: Beijing Fengtai Stadium; Attendance: 8,965; Referee: (China) Ma Ning (referee)

12 July 2019 17	Henan Jianye	3–2	Shandong Luneng Taishan	Zhengzhou
20:35 UTC+8	Fernando Karanga 18'; Ohandza 36'; Ivo 73'	Report	Song Long (yellow card) 47'; Duan Liuyu 66'; Liu Binbin 77'	Stadium: Zhengzhou Hanghai Stadium; Attendance: 21,765; Referee: (Bahrain) Nawaf Shukralla

17 July 2019 18	Shandong Luneng Taishan	2–1	Tianjin Tianhai	Jinan
20:35	Pellè 36'; Liu Binbin 45+2'	Report	Alan 90+2'	Stadium: Jinan Olympic Sports Center Stadium; Attendance: 17,426; Referee: (Serbia) Milorad Mažić

21 July 2019 19	Shandong Luneng Taishan	3–0	Shenzhen F.C.	Jinan
20:35	Selnæs 16' (o.g.); Fellaini 24'; Pellè 52'	Report	Wang Xinbo (yellow card) 14'; Liu Yiming (yellow card) 69'; Ge Zhen (yellow card) 90+1'	Stadium: Jinan Olympic Sports Center Stadium; Attendance: 18,235; Referee: (China) Huang Yejun

27 July 2019 20	Dalian Yifang	1–0	Shandong Luneng Taishan	Dalian
20:35 UTC+8	Boateng 20'; Wang Yaopeng (yellow card) 37'; Carrasco (yellow card) 63'	Report	Dai Lin (yellow card) 14'	Stadium: Dalian Sports Center Stadium; Attendance: 52,109; Referee: (China) Wang Zhe

3 August 2019 21	Shandong Luneng Taishan	0–3	Guangzhou Evergrande Taobao	Jinan
20:35	Pellè (yellow card) 90+3'	Report	Wei Shihao 52'; Elkeson 55'; Paulinho (yellow card) 64' (goal) 89'	Stadium: Jinan Olympic Sports Center Stadium; Attendance: 40,117; Referee: (Japan) Yusuke Araki

10 August 2019 22	Hebei China Fortune	0–3	Shandong Luneng Taishan	Langfang
20:35	Mascherano (yellow card) 11'	Report	Zheng Zheng (yellow card) 29'; Duan Liuyu 72'; Róger Guedes 76'; Fellaini 87'	Stadium: Langfang Stadium; Attendance: 21,326; Referee: (England) Mark Clattenburg

=== Chinese FA Cup ===
1 May 2019 Fourth Round	Shandong Luneng	2 – 1	Zhejiang Greentown	Jinan
16:30	Jin Jingdao 90+3'; Tian Xin 90+4'	Summary	Tan Yang 2'; Zhong Haoran (yellow card) 78'; Tong Lei (yellow card) 83'	Stadium: Jinan Olympic Sports Center Stadium; Referee: Huang Yi

29 May 2019 Last 16	Jiangsu Suning	0 – 1	Shandong Luneng	Nanjing
20:35		Report	Liu Binbin (yellow card) 68'; Pellè 81'; Róger Guedes (yellow card) 90+4'	Stadium: Nanjing Olympic Sports Centre; Attendance: 20,618; Referee: (England) Mark Clattenburg

24 July 2019 Quarter Final	Shandong Luneng	2 – 1 (a.e.t.)	Beijing Sinobo Guoan	Jinan
19:00	Róger Guedes 45+2'; Liu Junshuai (yellow card) 52'; Pellè 97'; Dai Lin (yellow card) 105'	Report	Lü Peng (yellow card) 60'; Bakambu 64'	Stadium: Jinan Olympic Sports Center Stadium; Attendance: 34,926; Referee: (Serbia) Milorad Mažić

19 August 2019 Semi Final	Shanghai SIPG	v	Shandong Luneng	Shanghai
				Stadium: Shanghai Stadium

=== AFC Champions League ===
==== Qualifying play-offs ====
19 February 2019 Play-off round	Shandong Luneng (China)	4–1	(Vietnam) Hà Nội	Jinan
15:30 UTC+8	Liu Junshuai 65'; Pellè 73'; Liu Binbin 86'; Zhou Haibin 90+2'	Live Report; Stats Report	Nguyễn Văn Quyết 39'	Stadium: Jinan Olympic Sports Center Stadium; Referee: Valentin Kovalenko (Uzbekistan)

==== Group stage ====
Pos	Team	Pld	W	D	L	GF	GA	GD	Pts	Qualification	SDL	KAS	GYE	JDT
1	(China) Shandong Luneng	6	3	2	1	10	8	+2	11	Advance to knockout stage	—	2–2	2–1	2–1
2	(Japan) Kashima Antlers	6	3	1	2	9	8	+1	10	Advance to knockout stage	2–1	—	0–1	2–1
3	(South Korea) Gyeongnam FC	6	2	2	2	9	8	+1	8		2–2	2–3	—	2–0
4	(Malaysia) Johor Darul Ta'zim	6	1	1	4	4	8	−4	4		0–1	1–0	1–1	—

Source: AFC
Rules for classification: Group stage tiebreakers

5 March 2019 Marchday 1	Gyeongnam FC (South Korea)	2–2	(China) Shandong Luneng
19:30 UTC+9	Woo Joo-sung 60'; Kim Seung-jun 68'		Pellè 21', 77'

12 March 2019 2	(China) Shandong Luneng Taishan	2–2	(Japan) Kashima Antlers	Jinan
15:30	Pellè 20' (pen.) (yellow card) 24' (goal) 41'	Report	Ito 10' 14'; Machida (yellow card) 89'	Stadium: Jinan Olympic Sports Center Stadium; Attendance: 12,185; Referee: (Iran) Mooud Bonyadifar

9 April 2019 3	(China) Shandong Luneng Taishan	2–1	(Malaysia) Johor Darul Ta'zim	Jinan
20:30	Fellaini 30'; Dai Lin (yellow card) 35'; Pellè 39' (pen.); Zheng Zheng (yellow card) 90+4'	Report	Aidil Zafuan (yellow card) 45'; Safawi Rasid 59'	Stadium: Jinan Olympic Sports Center Stadium; Attendance: 11,602; Referee: (Jordan) Adham Makhadmeh

24 April 2019 4	(Malaysia) Johor Darul Ta'zim	0–1	(China) Shandong Luneng Taishan	Johor Bahru
21:45	Diogo (yellow card) 30'	Report	Wang Tong (yellow card) 14'; Pellè 22'; Liu Yang (yellow card) 42'	Stadium: Tan Sri Dato' Haji Hassan Yunos Stadium; Attendance: 13,960; Referee: (Qatar) Khamis Al-Marri

8 May 2019 5	(China) Shandong Luneng Taishan	2–1	Gyeongnam FC (South Korea)	Jinan
20:30	Fellaini (yellow card) 45+2' (goal) 87'; Hao Junmin 64'; Wang Dalei (yellow card) 90+4'	Report	Kim Seung-jun 43'; Jo Jae-cheol (yellow card) 68'	Stadium: Jinan Olympic Sports Center Stadium; Attendance: 17,203; Referee: (Saudi Arabia) Turki Al-Khudhayr

22 May 2019 6	(Japan) Kashima Antlers	2–1	(China) Shandong Luneng Taishan	Kashima
19:00	Ito 68' 70'	Report	Fellaini 11'; Qi Tianyu (yellow card) 16'	Stadium: Kashima Soccer Stadium; Attendance: 8,836; Referee: (Qatar) Khamis Al-Kuwari

==== Round of 16 ====
18 June 2019 Round of 16 First Leg	(China) Guangzhou Evergrande Taobao	2–1	(China) Shandong Luneng Taishan	Guangzhou
21:00	Wei Shihao 35'; Zheng Zheng 80' (o.g.); Gao Zhunyi (yellow card) 89'	Report	Zhang Chi 66'	Stadium: Tianhe Stadium; Attendance: 38,900; Referee: (Sri Lanka) Hettikamkanamge Perera

25 June 2019 Round of 16 Second Leg	(China) Shandong Luneng Taishan	3–2 (4–4 agg.) (5–6 p)	(China) Guangzhou Evergrande Taobao	Jinan
20:30	Zhou Haibin 62'; Fellaini 70'; Jin Jingdao (yellow card) 90+1'; Liu Junshuai 93'; Dai Lin (yellow card) 101'; Liu Yang (yellow card) 109'	Report	Paulinho 13' 103'; Gao Lin (yellow card) 112'	Stadium: Jinan Olympic Sports Center Stadium; Attendance: 35,148; Referee: (Uzbekistan) Valentin Kovalenko
