= Marouane Fellaini =

Belgian footballer (born 1987)

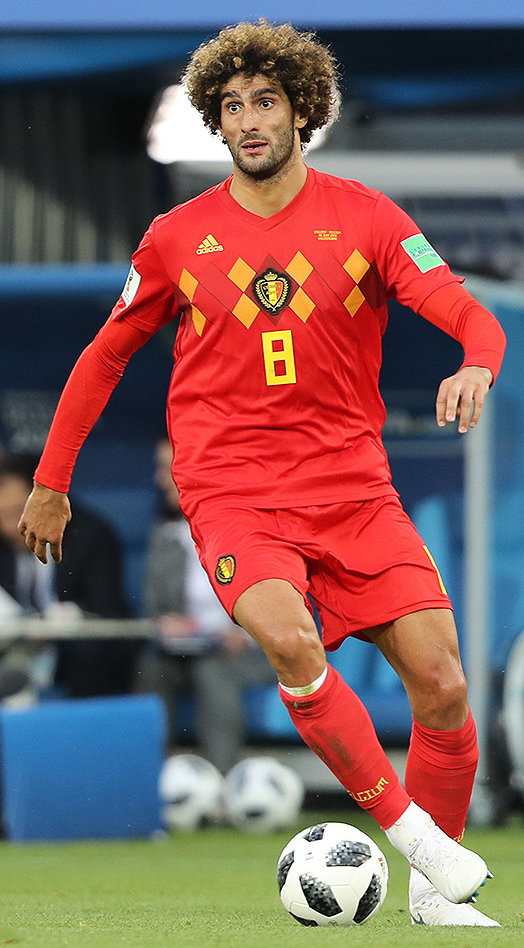
- Fellaini playing for Belgium at the 2018 FIFA World Cup

Personal information
- Full name: Marouane Fellaini-Bakkioui
- Date of birth: 22 November 1987 (age 38)
- Place of birth: Etterbeek, Brussels, Belgium
- Height: 1.94 m (6 ft 4 in)
- Position: Midfielder

Youth career
- 1994–1997: Anderlecht
- 1997–2000: Mons
- 2000–2002: R. Francs Borains
- 2002–2004: Sporting Charleroi
- 2004–2006: Standard Liège

Senior career*
Years	Team	Apps	(Gls)
2006–2008	Standard Liège	64	(9)
2008–2013	Everton	141	(25)
2013–2019	Manchester United	119	(12)
2019–2023	Shandong Taishan	108	(39)
Total		432	(85)

International career
2004–2005	Belgium U18	3	(0)
2006	Belgium U19	6	(1)
2006	Morocco U20	1	(0)
2006–2007	Belgium U21	7	(0)
2007–2018	Belgium	87	(18)
Medal record
Men's football
Representing Belgium
FIFA World Cup
Third place	2018 Russia
- * Club domestic league appearances and goals

Marouane Fellaini-Bakkioui (born 22 November 1987) is a Belgian former professional footballer who played as a midfielder.

Born in Etterbeek to Moroccan parents, Fellaini played youth football for Anderlecht, R.A.E.C. Mons, Royal Francs Borains and Charleroi before joining Standard Liège. After winning the Belgian Pro League and the Ebony Shoe as a Liège player, he moved to England to join Everton.

At Everton, Fellaini was the club's Young Player of the Season for 2008–09, when the club were losing finalists in the FA Cup. After five years at Everton, he transferred to Manchester United in a deal worth £27.5 million in September 2013. Fellaini spent over five years at Manchester United, helping the club win four trophies including the FA Cup, EFL Cup and UEFA Europa League. After more than a decade in England in total, Fellaini joined Chinese Super League club Shandong Taishan in February 2019.

A full international for the Belgium national team from 2007 until his international retirement in March 2019, Fellaini amassed 87 caps and 18 goals for Belgium. He played for the team at the 2008 Olympics, the 2014 World Cup, Euro 2016, and the 2018 World Cup, helping Belgium to third place in the latter tournament.

== Early life ==
Fellaini was born to Moroccan parents from Tangier and brought up in Brussels. His father, Abdellatif, was a former goalkeeper for Raja Casablanca and Hassania Agadir who signed for Racing Mechelen but was unable to play as his former Moroccan club refused to release his paperwork. Instead of returning home, he opted to become a bus driver for STIB. He would later take early retirement to oversee his son's career. Fellaini is Muslim.

== Club career ==
=== Early career ===
Born in Etterbeek, Brussels, Fellaini began playing football at the age of 7 for Anderlecht. He also competed in athletics, with the 10,000 metres being his preferred event. As a child he would run to school while his classmates used to make their daily journey by bus or car. However, Fellaini's father Abdellatif, who was a professional footballer himself, guided his son towards football. In his first season at Anderlecht's Academy, he scored 26 goals and in his second he scored 37. He was at Anderlecht's academy until the age of 10 when he joined Mons, due to his father getting a new job in the city. Three years later, he joined R. Francs Borains before leaving the club when he signed for Sporting Charleroi. At 17, he signed his first permanent contract with Standard Liège. Between 2006 and 2008, he made 84 appearances for the club, scoring 11 times. He is known for his heading ability and stamina, which made him one of the best box-to-box midfielders in the Belgian First Division and resulted in him winning the Ebony Shoe in 2008, an award given to the best player of the season of African descent.

=== Everton ===
After rejecting the advances of Manchester United and following reported interest from Aston Villa, Real Madrid, Tottenham Hotspur and Bayern Munich, Fellaini signed for Everton in September 2008 on a five-year deal from Standard Liège for an initial transfer fee of £15 million (at the time a record for a Belgian player and club record for Everton). He made his Everton debut in a 3–2 away victory at Stoke City on 14 September 2008, and scored his first goal for the team against Newcastle United in a 2–2 home draw on 5 October 2008. Fellaini went on to score 9 goals in his first season. During his debut season he was booked 10 times in his first 17 games and avoided a lengthy suspension by attending a personal hearing with England's chief referee, Keith Hackett, where he vowed to improve his behaviour. He picked up three further bookings in 16 games following the meeting, his total the highest of all Premier League players that season. At the end of the 2008–09 season he was named Everton's Young Player of the Season.

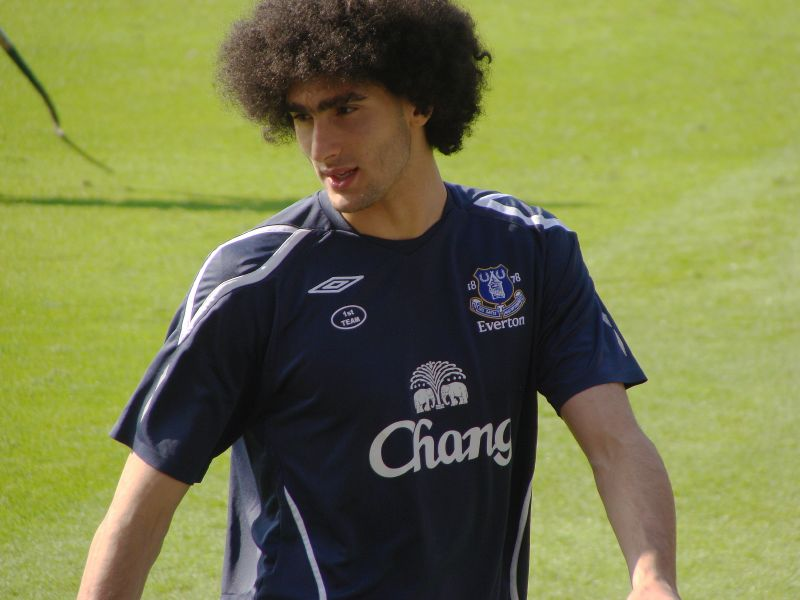
Fellaini warming up before a match against Fulham in 2009

In England he has become well known for his large afro hairstyle, becoming a fan favourite with Everton fans regularly sporting Afro wigs as a homage to Fellaini. Fellaini was deployed as a second striker during the 2008–09 season, when Everton had all of their forwards out injured, usually playing behind another midfielder being used as an attacker, Tim Cahill. Later Fellaini reverted to play in his least favourite defensive midfield area. His performances in late 2009 and early 2010 became so impressive that David Moyes labelled him "as good as anyone in the league", and he re-iterated this after Fellaini won Man of the Match against Manchester City on 16 January. Fellaini was stretchered off in the 34th minute of the Merseyside derby on 6 February after a two-footed tackle by Sotirios Kyrgiakos, ruling him out for the rest of the 2009–10 season. Kyrgiakos was sent off as a result of Fellaini's injury.

Fellaini suffered an ACL injury in an FA Cup replay victory against Chelsea in February 2011 and although he was able to play in a 2–0 win against Sunderland a week later, the injury caused him to miss the remainder of the 2010–11 season. He did not play a competitive match until August 2011, when he appeared as a substitute in a 1–0 loss to Queens Park Rangers at Goodison Park and played the full match in the very next fixture, as Everton beat Sheffield United 3–1 in the League Cup. In November 2011, he signed a new five-year contract with the club. He finished the season having won the most tackles, aerial duels and made more passes than anyone else at the club. He won the second highest number of tackles in the league and won possession of the ball 190 times, the most out of any player.

In the opening game of the 2012–13 Premier League season against Manchester United, Fellaini received plaudits for his outstanding performance, as he scored the only goal in a 1–0 victory. He continued the season in great form with goals against Arsenal, Manchester City, Sunderland and Fulham amongst others. Fellaini was subsequently awarded Premier League Player of the Month for November 2012.

Fellaini was banned for three matches by the Football Association on 17 December 2012 after headbutting Ryan Shawcross during a game against Stoke City, an incident missed by the match officials at the time. The same month he was ranked as number 60 in "The 100 Best Footballers in the World" by The Guardian.

=== Manchester United ===
==== 2013–14 season ====
On 2 September 2013, Fellaini signed a four-year contract, with the option of extension of another season, reuniting with former manager David Moyes at Manchester United in a £27.5 million, deadline day deal, despite the fact that he had a lower buyout clause earlier in the transfer window. He made his debut for the club on 14 September, in a 2–0 home win against Crystal Palace, coming on as a 62nd-minute substitute for Anderson. He made his full debut on 17 September, starting in a 4–2 win against Bayer Leverkusen in the UEFA Champions League. On 5 November, Fellaini received his first red card for Manchester United in a match against Real Sociedad in the group stage of the Champions League.

In April 2014, Fellaini was named as one of the "10 Worst Buys of the Premier League season" by The Daily Telegraph. He made only fifteen league starts throughout the season, in contrast to thirty one starts he made in the previous season while at Everton.

==== 2014–15 season ====
In his first pre-season game of 2014–15, Fellaini came off the substitutes bench to score his first Manchester United goal in injury time, giving the club a 2–1 win over Valencia in Louis van Gaal's first game at Old Trafford as manager.

On 20 October 2014, he scored his first competitive goal for Manchester United in a 2–2 draw in the Premier League against West Bromwich Albion two minutes after coming on as a half time substitute. He was given his first start of the season by Van Gaal in the following match against Chelsea, and helped United earn a point against the league leaders. Fellaini covered 12.17 kilometres in the match, the most by any United player, and made 70 high-intensity runs, more than anyone else on the pitch. During second half stoppage time, he contributed to United's goal when his header was saved by Thibaut Courtois and ultimately rebounded in by Robin van Persie. On 2 December, Fellaini scored his first competitive home goal for Manchester United in a 2–1 defeat of Stoke City.

Fellaini's third goal of the season came in a 2–0 away win at Queens Park Rangers on 17 January 2015. On 15 March 2015, he scored his fourth goal of the season and assisted the second goal for Michael Carrick in a home game against Tottenham in which United won 3–0 and he was voted Man of the Match. On 12 April, he scored the second goal for Manchester United in a 4–2 win in the Manchester derby. On 9 May, he scored the winner, his seventh of the season, for Manchester United in a 2–1 win over Crystal Palace. On 24 May, Fellaini was sent off in Manchester United's final Premier League fixture of the season, a 0–0 draw with Hull City at the KC Stadium, 18 minutes after appearing as a substitute.

==== 2015–16 season ====
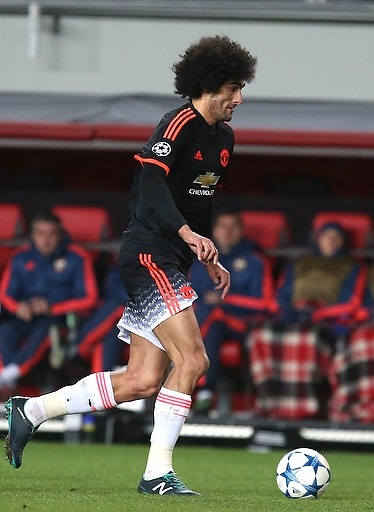
Fellaini during the 2015–16 season

On 18 August, his first match for the club in the 2015–16 season, Fellaini scored the third goal in a 3–1 home victory over Club Brugge in the first leg of the Champions League play-offs. On 25 August 2015, Louis van Gaal stated that Fellaini would feature more as a striker. After struggling to establish himself as a striker in the next few games, he admitted in an interview with Bleacher Report: "When the manager asks me to play somewhere, I play there. But my best position is midfield."

Fellaini scored the first goal in a 2–1 win against Everton in the FA Cup semi-final at Wembley Stadium on 23 April 2016. On 5 May, Fellaini was handed a 3-match suspension by the FA for throwing an elbow at Leicester City's Robert Huth. Huth was handed the same punishment for tugging at Fellaini's hair during the altercation. He played the full 120 minutes as Manchester United beat Crystal Palace 2–1 in extra time in the 2016 FA Cup final. He also assisted Juan Mata's equaliser in the final.

==== 2016–17 season ====
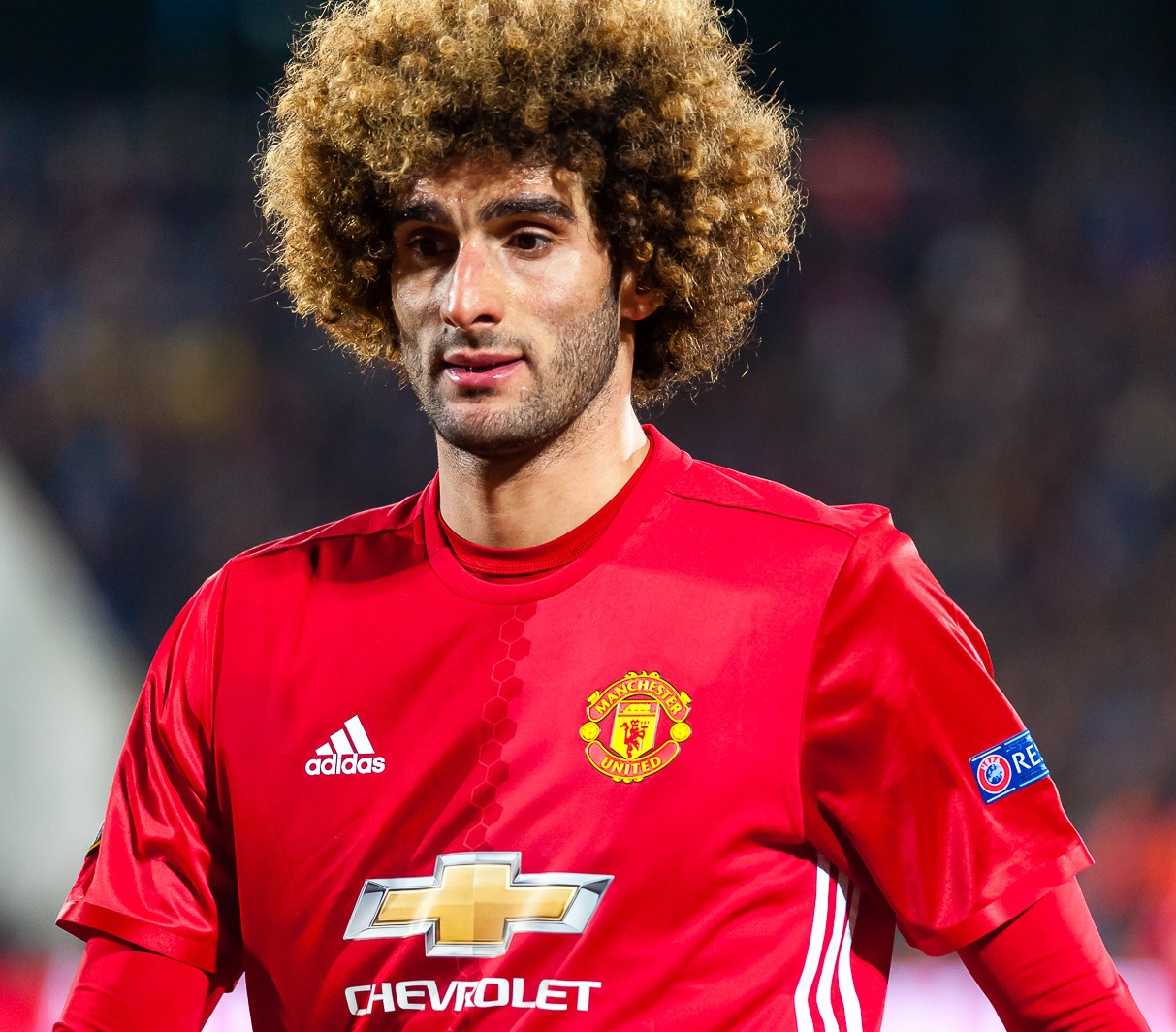
Fellaini with United in 2017

On 7 August 2016, Fellaini played the full 90 minutes in United's 2–1 Community Shield victory over Leicester City. On 4 December, he made his 100th appearance for United against his former club Everton and conceded a penalty just a few minutes after coming on as an 85th-minute substitute. Leighton Baines successfully converted the spot kick in the 89th minute to secure a late equaliser for the Toffees in a match that finished 1–1. Due to José Mourinho's preference for Ander Herrera alongside Paul Pogba in central midfield, Fellaini's appearances for Manchester United had become limited to coming off the bench; however, on 11 January – the day after he scored the second goal in Manchester United's 2–0 win over Hull City in the first leg of their 2016–17 EFL Cup semi-final – Manchester United activated a one-year extension clause in Fellaini's contract, keeping him at the club until the end of the 2017–18 season. The Belgian featured for the entirety of United's 2017 UEFA Europa League Final victory against Dutch club Ajax.

==== 2017–18 season ====
Fellaini's first goal of the 2017–18 season came against Leicester City, in a 2–0 win on 26 August 2017. He then scored a header against Basel, helping United win the Champions League group stage game 3–0 on 12 September. On 30 September, Fellaini scored a brace in a 4–0 win against Crystal Palace, upping his goal tally to four goals in eight games. After the win, José Mourinho praised his performances, saying "He had to be a strong character. He is a fighter, a guy with lots of pride and I am really pleased I helped him reach this level and change the perception the fans have now. I'm really happy for him." He signed a new two-year contract at the end of the campaign.

==== 2018–19 season ====
Fellaini made 19 appearances for Manchester United in the first half of the 2018–19 season, scoring 90th-minute goals against both Derby County in the EFL Cup and Young Boys in the UEFA Champions League. However, after the dismissal of head coach José Mourinho, Fellaini found opportunities limited and he played in just two of nine possible matches under caretaker manager Ole Gunnar Solskjær, both as a substitute.

=== Shandong Taishan ===
At the end of January 2019, Fellaini agreed a contract with Chinese club Shandong Luneng and was officially transferred on 1 February 2019, concluding his five-and-a-half year spell with Manchester United.

He played in this club for five years. On 3 November 2023, Fellaini announced that he would leave the club at the end of the season. He played his last match for the club at the 2023 Chinese FA Cup final against Shanghai Shenhua.

=== Retirement ===
On 3 February 2024, Fellaini announced his retirement from professional football.

== International career ==
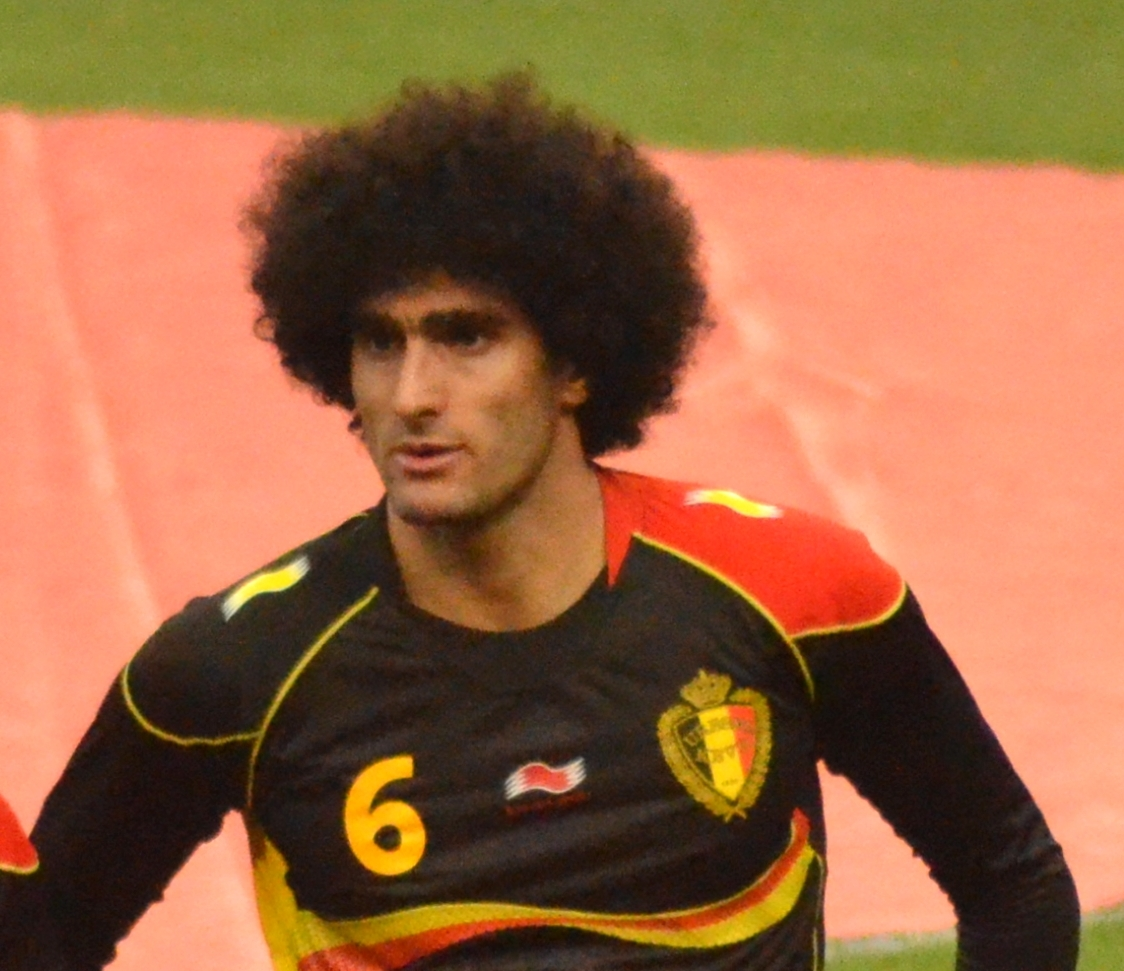
Fellaini before an international friendly against the United States in 2013

Fellaini was eligible to play for either Belgium or Morocco. He chose to represent Belgium, from youth level upwards. He represented the under-23 team at the 2008 Olympics, when they finished in fourth place, losing to Brazil in the bronze medal match. His senior team debut was made in February 2007, and his first goal for the senior team came in a 2–1 defeat against Portugal a UEFA Euro 2008 qualification match.

Fellaini made seven appearances in Belgium's 2014 FIFA World Cup qualification campaign, scoring once, as Belgium reached the finals for the first time since 2002. On 4 June 2014, Fellaini was selected as part of Belgium's 23-man squad for the 2014 World Cup. On 17 June, in Belgium's opening match against Algeria, Fellaini came on as a second-half substitute and scored the Red Devils' equalising goal in a 2–1 win. He was then named in the starting line-up for the second match against Russia on 22 June and went on to play every minute of les Diables Rouges' run to the quarter-finals, where they were defeated 1–0 by Argentina in Brasília.

During qualification for UEFA Euro 2016, Fellaini scored two goals in Belgium's 5–0 defeat of Cyprus and the winner in a 1–0 away victory in Israel. Following these goals, on 7 June 2015, he reached five in his last three internationals by scoring the opening two goals in a 4–3 friendly win over France at the Stade de France. On 3 September 2015, he scored his sixth goal in four international appearances against Bosnia and Herzegovina.

At the 2018 FIFA World Cup in Russia, Fellaini scored the equalising goal after Japan had gone 2–0 up in a round of 16 match that saw Belgium win 3–2. On 7 March 2019, Fellaini announced his retirement from international football. He earned a total of 87 caps and scored 18 goals for Belgium between 2007 and 2018.

== Style of play ==
A versatile player, Fellaini was capable of playing in several positions. He often played in a defensive midfield role, or in the centre as a box-to-box midfielder, but was also capable of playing in a more advanced creative role as playmaker, or even as second striker or centre-forward during his time under David Moyes at Everton; he was also deployed as a centre-back or out wide in his youth. Fellaini was known for his tackling and work-rate, despite his lack of pace; he was also known for his eye for goal from midfield and ability to get forward, and was able to shoot and pass well with either foot, despite often favouring simple solutions when in possession. While not the most naturally technically gifted player, he was also known for his hold-up play and ability to control the ball well with his chest. Due to his height and physique, he was known in particular for his ability in the air and penchant for scoring headers, which led manager Louis van Gaal to deploy him as a deep-lying target man, or even as a striker up-front, in a 4–3–3 formation on occasion during their time together at Manchester United, which suited the team's long ball tactics.

== Career statistics ==
=== Club ===
Appearances and goals by club, season and competition
Club	Season	League			National cup (Note: Includes Belgian Cup, FA Cup, Chinese FA Cup)		League cup (Note: Includes Football League/EFL Cup)		Continental		Other		Total	
Club	Season	Division	Apps	Goals	Apps	Goals	Apps	Goals	Apps	Goals	Apps	Goals	Apps	Goals
Standard Liège	2006–07	Belgian First Division	30	3	7	1	—		3 (Note: Two appearances in UEFA Champions League, one appearance in UEFA Cup)	0	—		40	4
Standard Liège	2007–08	Belgian First Division	31	6	5	1	—		3 (Note: Appearances in UEFA Cup)	0	—		39	7
Standard Liège	2008–09	Belgian First Division	3	0	0	0	—		2 (Note: Appearances in UEFA Champions League)	0	—		5	0
Standard Liège	Total		64	9	12	2	—		8	0	—		84	11
Everton	2008–09	Premier League	30	8	4	1	1	0	—		—		35	9
Everton	2009–10	Premier League	23	2	2	0	2	0	7 (Note: Appearances in UEFA Europa League)	1	—		34	3
Everton	2010–11	Premier League	20	1	3	1	2	1	—		—		25	3
Everton	2011–12	Premier League	34	3	6	1	3	1	—		—		43	5
Everton	2012–13	Premier League	31	11	4	1	1	0	—		—		36	12
Everton	2013–14	Premier League	3	0	—		1	1	—		—		4	1
Everton	Total		141	25	19	4	10	3	7	1	—		177	33
Manchester United	2013–14	Premier League	16	0	0	0	—		5	0	—		21	0
Manchester United	2014–15	Premier League	27	6	4	1	0	0	—		—		31	7
Manchester United	2015–16	Premier League	18	1	6	2	2	0	8 (Note: Six appearances and one goal in UEFA Champions League, two appearances in UEFA Europa League)	1	—		34	4
Manchester United	2016–17	Premier League	28	1	3	1	4	1	11	1	1 (Note: Appearance in FA Community Shield)	0	47	4
Manchester United	2017–18	Premier League	16	4	3	0	0	0	3	1	1 (Note: Appearance in UEFA Super Cup)	0	23	5
Manchester United	2018–19	Premier League	14	0	1	0	1	1	5	1	—		21	2
Manchester United	Total		119	12	17	4	7	2	32	4	2	0	177	22
Shandong Taishan	2019	Chinese Super League	22	7	4	1	—		8 (Note: Appearances in AFC Champions League)	4	—		34	12
Shandong Taishan	2020	Chinese Super League	12	4	5	3	—		—		6 (Note: Appearances in Chinese Super League championship play-offs)	1	23	8
Shandong Taishan	2021	Chinese Super League	20	10	3	1	—		—		—		23	11
Shandong Taishan	2022	Chinese Super League	28	7	0	0	—		0	0	—		28	7
Shandong Taishan	2023	Chinese Super League	26	11	3	1	—		3 (Note: Appearances in AFC Champions League Elite)	1	1 (Note: Appearance in Chinese FA Super Cup)	0	33	13
Shandong Taishan	Total		108	39	15	6	—		11	5	7	1	141	51
Career total			432	85	63	16	17	5	58	10	9	1	579	117

=== International ===
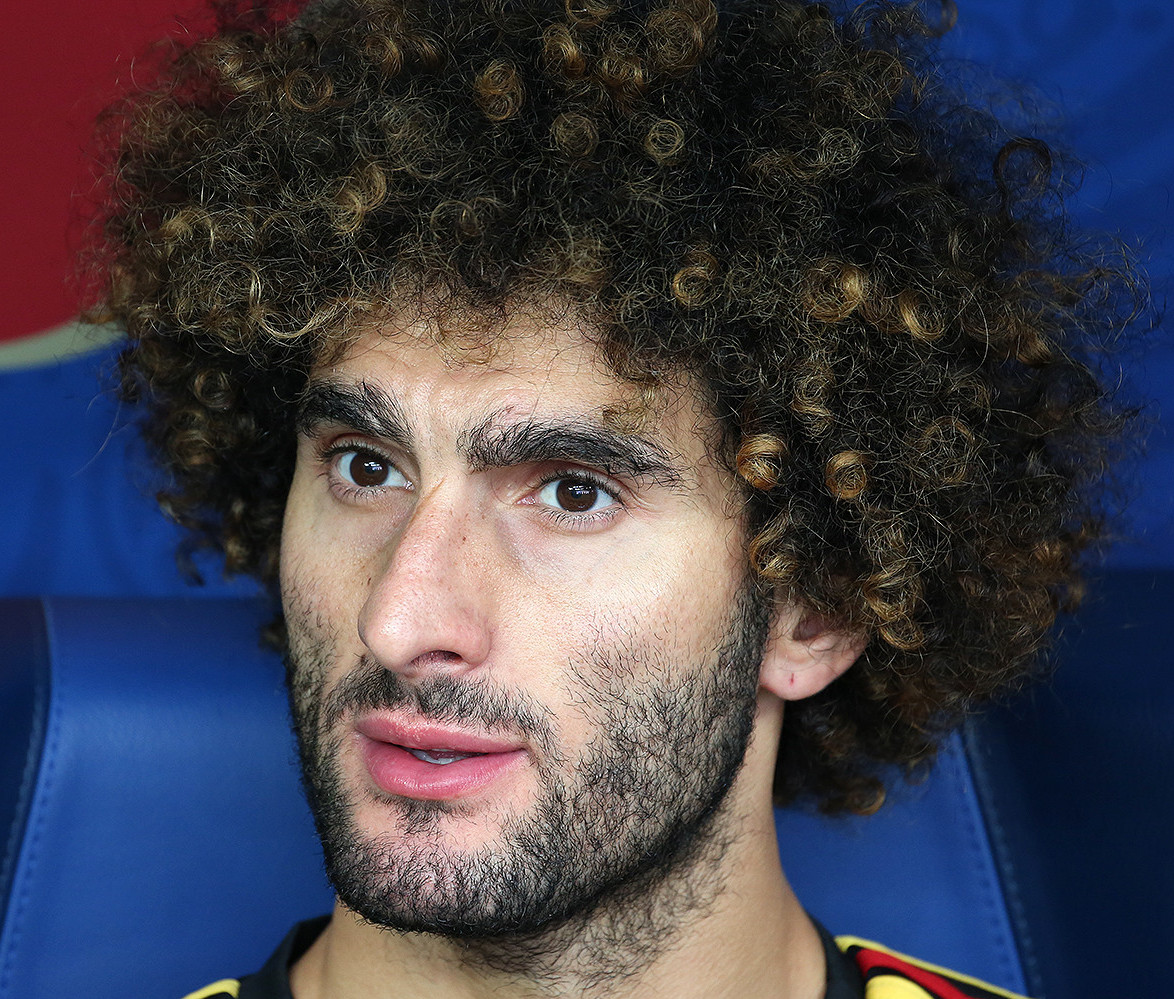
Fellaini with Belgium at the 2018 FIFA World Cup

Appearances and goals by national team and year
National team	Year	Apps	Goals
Belgium	2007	8	1
Belgium	2008	6	1
Belgium	2009	7	1
Belgium	2010	5	1
Belgium	2011	6	1
Belgium	2012	6	0
Belgium	2013	9	2
Belgium	2014	13	2
Belgium	2015	6	6
Belgium	2016	9	0
Belgium	2017	5	1
Belgium	2018	7	2
Total		87	18

Scores and results list Belgium's goal tally first, score column indicates score after each Fellaini goal.

List of international goals scored by Marouane Fellaini
No.	Date	Venue	Opponent	Score	Result	Competition	Ref.
1	2 June 2007	King Baudouin Stadium, Brussels, Belgium	Portugal	1–1	1–2	UEFA Euro 2008 qualification	
2	11 October 2008	King Baudouin Stadium, Brussels, Belgium	Armenia	2–0	2–0	2010 FIFA World Cup qualification	
3	14 November 2009	Jules Ottenstadion, Ghent, Belgium	Hungary	1–0	3–0	Friendly	
4	12 October 2010	King Baudouin Stadium, Brussels, Belgium	Austria	2–2	4–4	UEFA Euro 2012 qualification	
5	11 October 2011	Esprit Arena, Düsseldorf, Germany	Germany	1–3	1–3	UEFA Euro 2012 qualification	
6	29 May 2013	FirstEnergy Stadium, Cleveland, United States	United States	4–1	4–2	Friendly	
7	7 June 2013	King Baudouin Stadium, Brussels, Belgium	Serbia	2–0	2–1	2014 FIFA World Cup qualification	
8	5 March 2014	King Baudouin Stadium, Brussels, Belgium	Ivory Coast	1–0	2–2	Friendly	
9	17 June 2014	Mineirão, Belo Horizonte, Brazil	Algeria	1–1	2–1	2014 FIFA World Cup	
10	28 March 2015	King Baudouin Stadium, Brussels, Belgium	Cyprus	1–0	5–0	UEFA Euro 2016 qualification	
11	28 March 2015	King Baudouin Stadium, Brussels, Belgium	Cyprus	3–0	5–0	UEFA Euro 2016 qualification	
12	31 March 2015	Teddy Stadium, Jerusalem, Israel	Israel	1–0	1–0	UEFA Euro 2016 qualification	
13	7 June 2015	Stade de France, Saint-Denis, France	France	1–0	4–3	Friendly	
14	7 June 2015	Stade de France, Saint-Denis, France	France	2–0	4–3	Friendly	
15	3 September 2015	King Baudouin Stadium, Brussels, Belgium	Bosnia and Herzegovina	1–1	3–1	UEFA Euro 2016 qualification	
16	5 June 2017	King Baudouin Stadium, Brussels, Belgium	Czech Republic	1–0	2–1	Friendly	
17	6 June 2018	King Baudouin Stadium, Brussels, Belgium	Egypt	3–0	3–0	Friendly	
18	2 July 2018	Rostov Arena, Rostov-on-Don, Russia	Japan	2–2	3–2	2018 FIFA World Cup	

Notes

1. Fellaini caps against Romania on 14 November 2012, against Luxembourg on 26 May 2014 and against Czech Republic (included his one goal) on 5 June 2017 were counted by RBFA but not officially recognised by FIFA due to an excessive number of substitutions according to the Laws of the Game.

== Honours ==
Standard Liège

- Belgian First Division: 2007–08

Everton

- FA Cup runner up: 2008–09

Manchester United

- FA Cup: 2015–16; runner-up: 2017–18
- EFL Cup: 2016–17
- FA Community Shield: 2016
- UEFA Europa League: 2016–17

Shandong Taishan

- Chinese Super League: 2021
- Chinese FA Cup: 2020, 2021, 2022; runner-up: 2023

Belgium

- FIFA World Cup third place: 2018

Individual

- Best Belgian Player Abroad: 2008
- Belgian Bronze Shoe: 2008
- Ebony Shoe: 2008
- Everton Young Player of the Season: 2008–09
- Premier League Player of the Month: November 2012
- Belgian Lion Award Best Player Abroad: 2016, 2017, 2018, 2019, 2020
- Chinese Super League Team of the Year: 2021
- DH The Best Standard Liège Team Ever: 2020
