= Ryoya Ito =

Japanese footballer

Ryoya Ito 伊藤 遼哉
Personal information
- Full name: Ryoya Ito
- Date of birth: May 2, 1998 (age 28)
- Place of birth: Tokyo, Japan
- Height: 1.80 m (5 ft 11 in)
- Position: Attacking midfielder

Youth career
- 2010–2011: FC Zürich
- 2011–2012: Grasshopper Club Zürich
- 2012–2014: FC Bayern Munich
- 2014–2016: FC Schalke 04
- 2016–2017: Fortuna Düsseldorf

Senior career*
Years	Team	Apps	(Gls)
2018–2019	Sagan Tosu	0	(0)
2019	SSV Jeddeloh	8	(2)
2020	TSV 1880 Wasserburg	0	(0)
2020–2021	Sportfreunde Lotte	14	(1)
2021–2022	SV Lippstadt 08	8	(0)
- * Club domestic league appearances and goals as of 14 May 2022

Ryoya Ito (伊藤 遼哉, Itō Ryōya; born May 2, 1998) is a Japanese football player who plays for EFL championship club Blackburn Rovers.

== Playing career ==
Ito was born in Tokyo on May 2, 1998. He joined J1 League club Sagan Tosu in 2018.

Ito joined J.League club after developing in the youth academies of famous clubs like Bayern Munich, FC Schalke 04, Fortuna Düsseldorf and Grasshopper Club Zürich across his teenage years.

He was noted for being pursued by three countries who he was eligible to represent at under-age level, Australia, Japan and Germany.

In 2018, he joined J.League side Sagan Tosu on a two-year contract. In June 2019, he decided to leave the club in favour of returning to Europe. “This decision was not easy, but I would like to try the overseas challenge one more time. I want to apply what I have learned at Tosu and do my very best from here on,” he said.

He was signed by German club SSV Jeddeloh, where he scored two goals in his first six games, playing a key role as the club avoided relegation from the Regionalliga.

== Career statistics ==
Last update: 27 February 2019

Club performance			League		Cup		League Cup		Total	
Season	Club	League	Apps	Goals	Apps	Goals	Apps	Goals	Apps	Goals
Japan			League		Emperor's Cup		League Cup		Total	
2018	Sagan Tosu	J1 League	0	0	0	0	1	0	1	0
Career total			0	0	0	0	1	0	1	0
