= Róger Guedes =

Brazilian association football player

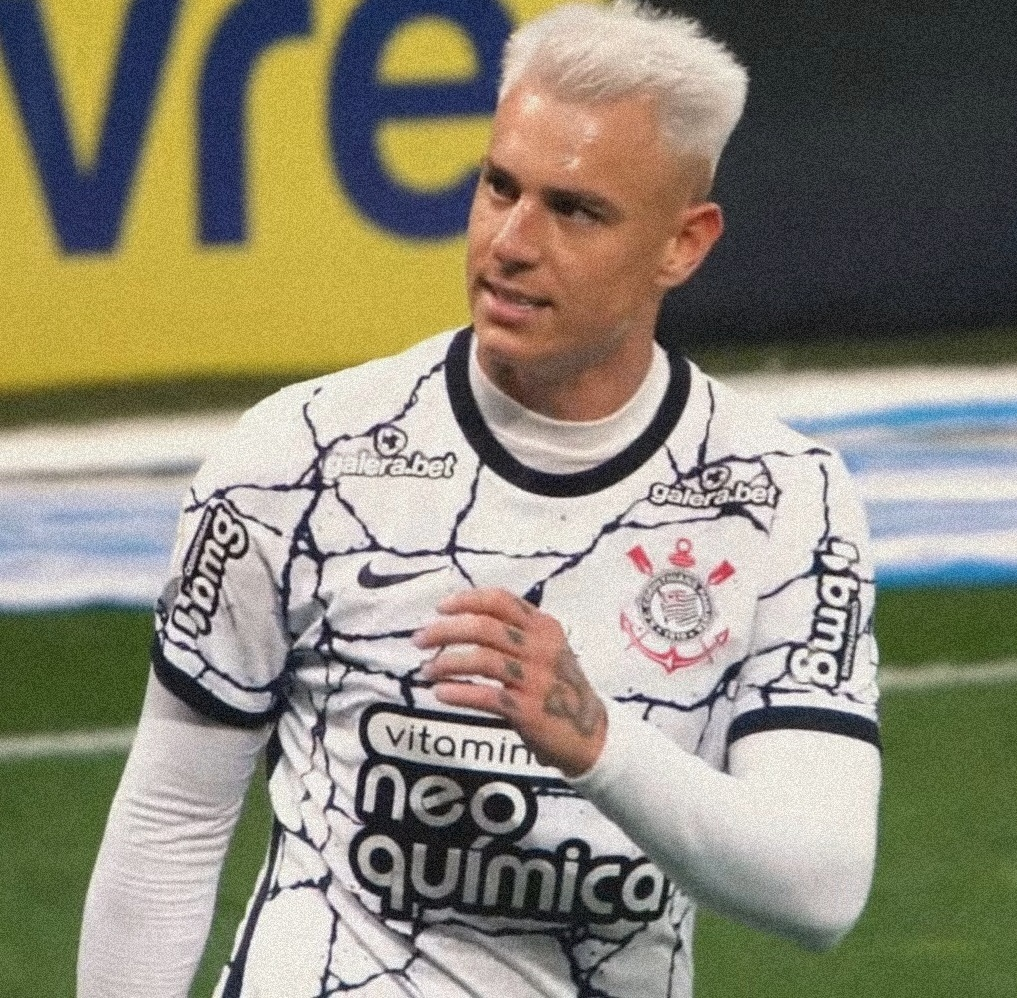
- Guedes with Corinthians in 2021

Personal information
- Full name: Róger Krug Guedes
- Date of birth: 2 October 1996 (age 30)
- Place of birth: Ibirubá, Brazil
- Height: 1.82 m (6 ft 0 in)
- Positions: Second striker; attacking midfielder

Team information
- Current team: Al-Rayyan
- Number: 10

Youth career
- 2006–2010: Grêmio
- 2011–2014: Criciúma

Senior career*
Years	Team	Apps	(Gls)
2014–2016	Criciúma	57	(8)
2016–2018	Palmeiras	71	(12)
2018	→ Atlético Mineiro (loan)	20	(11)
2018–2021	Shandong Luneng	41	(20)
2021–2023	Corinthians	97	(36)
2023–	Al-Rayyan	74	(66)
- * Club domestic league appearances and goals as of 31 October 2026

Róger Krug Guedes (born 2 October 1996) is a Brazilian professional footballer who plays as a second striker or attacking midfielder for Qatar Stars League club Al-Rayyan.

== Club career ==
=== Criciúma ===
Born in Ibirubá, Rio Grande do Sul, Guedes started his career with Grêmio's youth setup, but was released in 2011. He moved to Criciúma shortly after, and finished his formation with the club. Guedes made his first team debut on 23 November 2014, coming on as a half-time substitute in a 1–1 away draw against Flamengo in Série A; he also assisted Cléber Santana for the equalising goal. His first senior goal came on 6 December, as he scored the equalizer in a 2–1 loss at Corinthians.

Guedes was promoted to the main squad ahead of the 2015 campaign, with his side now in the Série B.

=== Palmeiras ===
On 5 April 2016, Guedes signed a five-year contract with Palmeiras in the top tier; Verdão paid R$ 2.5 million for 25% of his federative rights. He made his debut for the club 14 days later, replacing Alecsandro in a 2–0 Campeonato Paulista home win against São Bernardo FC. Guedes scored during his top tier debut for the club on 14 May, netting the first in a 4–0 home routing of Atlético Paranaense. He scored four goals in 31 appearances during the season, as his side was crowned champions. On 31 January 2017, Guedes renewed his contract with Palmeiras, receiving a pay rise to upgrade his release clause.

In 2017, a video emerged of a Palmeiras training session where Guedes is seen taking part in a fitness session on a practice pitch from afar. His teammates would proceed to chase him off the pitch before pinning him to the ground and tying him up with wire with coaching staff and manager Cuca looking on. According to Guedes, this was not the first time he was physically harassed by Palmeiras players and that the justification for such cruelty was to toughen him up for big games.

On 27 December 2017, Guedes joined Atlético Mineiro on a season-long loan swap deal involving him and Marcos Rocha.

=== Shandong Luneng Taishan ===
On 13 July 2018, Guedes was loaned to Chinese Super League side Shandong Luneng Taishan for one year with an obligation to buy for €9.6 million. He made his debut for the club on 28 July in a 1–1 draw with Jiangsu Suning. After the loan move was made permanent, he would establish himself as a vital member of the team, being part of the team that won the 2020 Chinese FA Cup against Jiangsu in a 2–0 victory.

=== Corinthians ===
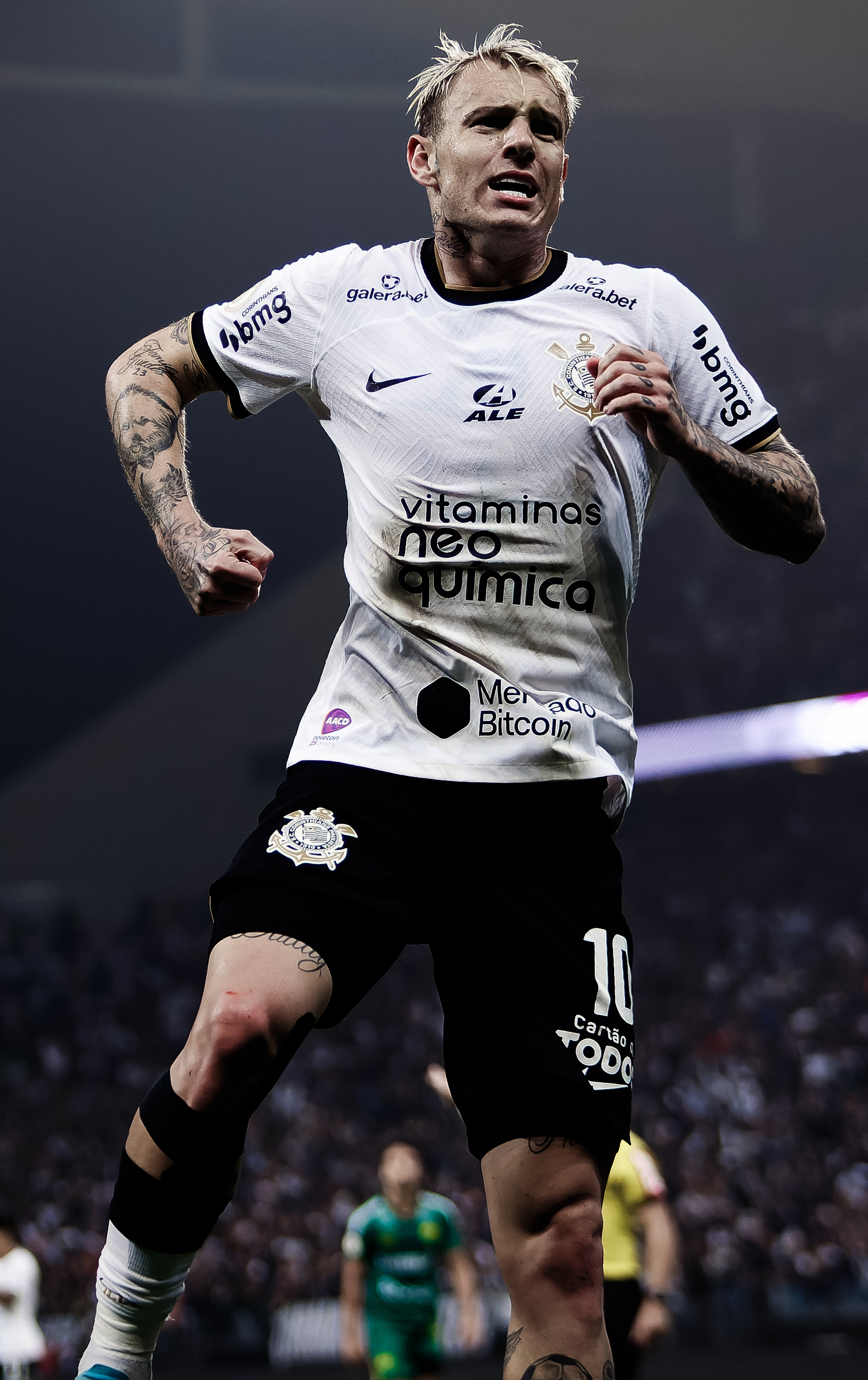
Guedes celebrating a goal for Corinthians in 2022

On 27 August 2021, Guedes signed with Brazilian club Corinthians, after rescinding with Shandong. Uniquely, he wore the number 123 jersey in his first season, because the number 23 (which he usually wears in honour of his son's birthday) was already taken by Fagner. A month later, on 26 September, he scored both goals in a 2–1 victory in the Paulista Derby against his former club Palmeiras.

After that, Guedes wore the number 9 jersey for the most part of 2022 season, later changing his jersey to number 10 when Willian rescinded his contract with Corinthians.

=== Al-Rayyan ===
On 9 August 2023, Guedes signed with Qatar Stars League side Al-Rayyan.

He scored his first goal for the club on his debut against Al Markhiya in a 1–0 away victory on 17 August 2023. A week later on 25 August, Guedes assisted Rodrigo’s goal in a 1–0 home victory against Qatar SC. In his first season with the club, he managed to get 19 goals and 5 assists. In the 24/25 season, He scored 21 goals in 22 appearances, Winning the Mansour Muftah award for being the top goal-scorer in the league. He also scored a penalty at the 2025 Amir Cup final in the 49th minute.

== Career statistics ==
As of match played 4 November 2026

Club	Season	League			State league (Note: Includes Campeonato Catarinense, Campeonato Paulista, Campeonato Mineiro)		National cup (Note: Includes Copa do Brasil, Chinese FA Cup, Amir of Qatar Cup)		League cup (Note: Includes QSL Cup)		Continental		Other		Total	
Club	Season	Division	Apps	Goals	Apps	Goals	Apps	Goals	Apps	Goals	Apps	Goals	Apps	Goals	Apps	Goals
Criciúma	2014	Série A	3	1	0	0	0	0	—		—		—		3	1
Criciúma	2015	Série B	21	2	19	2	2	0	—		—		—		42	4
Criciúma	2016	Série B	0	0	14	3	0	0	—		—		3 (Note: Appearances in Primeira Liga)	0	17	3
Criciúma	Total		24	3	33	5	2	0	—		—		3	0	62	8
Palmeiras	2016	Série A	31	4	2	0	1	0	—		—		—		34	4
Palmeiras	2017	Série A	26	4	12	4	4	0	—		7 (Note: Appearances in Copa Libertadores)	0	—		49	8
Palmeiras	Total		57	8	14	4	5	0	—		7	0	—		83	12
Atlético Mineiro (loan)	2018	Série A	12	9	8	2	8	2	—		—		—		28	13
Shandong Luneng	2018	Chinese Super League	9	2	—		1	0	—		—		—		10	2
Shandong Luneng	2019	Chinese Super League	21	12	—		4	1	—		1 (Note: Appearance in AFC Champions League)	0	—		26	13
Shandong Luneng	2020	Chinese Super League	11	6	—		6	6	—		—		—		17	12
Shandong Luneng	Total		41	20	—		11	7	—		1	0	—		53	27
Corinthians	2021	Série A	19	7	—		—		—		—		—		19	7
Corinthians	2022	Série A	36	10	14	4	8	1	—		8	0	—		66	15
Corinthians	2023	Série A	15	7	13	8	7	3	—		6 (Note: Five appearances and three goals in Copa Libertadores, one appearance in Copa Sudamericana)	3	—		41	21
Corinthians	Total		70	24	27	12	15	4	—		14	3	—		126	43
Al-Rayyan	2023–24	Qatar Stars League	22	19	—		2	3	2	0	—		2 (Note: Appearances in Qatar Cup)	0	28	22
Al-Rayyan	2024–25	Qatar Stars League	22	21	—		4	5	4	1	10 (Note: Appearances in AFC Champions League Elite)	4	1 (Note: Appearance in UAE–Qatar Super Cup Series)	1	41	32
Al-Rayyan	2025–26	Qatar Stars League	22	21	—		2	1	7	9	—		7 (Note: Appearances in AGCFF Gulf Club Champions League)	5	38	36
Al-Rayyan	2026–27	Qatar Stars League	8	5	—		0	0	1	1	4 (Note: Appearance in AFC Champions League Two)	2	1	2	14	10
Al-Rayyan	Total		74	66	—		8	9	14	11	14	6	11	8	121	100
Career total			278	130	82	23	49	22	14	11	36	9	14	8	473	203

== Honours ==
Palmeiras

- Campeonato Brasileiro Série A: 2016

Shandong Luneng

- Chinese FA Cup: 2020

Al-Rayyan

- QSL Cup: 2025–26
- AGCFF Gulf Club Champions League: 2025–26
- Amir of Qatar Cup runner-up: 2025

Individual

- Qatar Stars League Team of the Year: 2023–24
- Qatar Stars League Top goalscorer: 2024–25, 2025–26
- AGCFF Gulf Club Champions League Best Player: 2025–26
