= Gil (footballer, born June 1987) =

Brazilian footballer

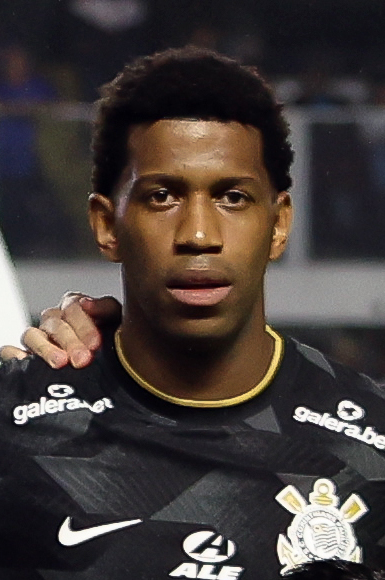
- Gil with Corinthians in July 2022

Personal information
- Full name: Carlos Gilberto Nascimento Silva
- Date of birth: 12 June 1987 (age 39)
- Place of birth: Campos dos Goytacazes, Brazil
- Height: 1.93 m (6 ft 4 in)
- Position: Centre-back

Youth career
- 2001–2004: Rio Branco-RJ
- 2004–2006: Americano

Senior career*
Years	Team	Apps	(Gls)
2007–2008	Americano	15	(2)
2007	→ Jaguaré (loan)	0	(0)
2008	→ Atlético Goianiense (loan)	27	(5)
2008–2009	Atlético Goianiense	31	(1)
2009–2011	Cruzeiro	80	(3)
2011–2012	Valenciennes	40	(2)
2011	Valenciennes II	2	(1)
2013–2016	Corinthians	146	(7)
2016–2019	Shandong Luneng	101	(8)
2019–2023	Corinthians	206	(9)
2024–2025	Santos	65	(1)

International career^{‡}
2014–2017	Brazil	11	(0)
- * Club domestic league appearances and goals as of 15:46, 11 August 2025 (UTC) ‡ National team caps and goals as of 13 June 2018

Carlos Gilberto Nascimento Silva (born 12 June 1987), commonly known as Gil (Portuguese pronunciation: [ʒiw]), is a Brazilian former professional footballer who played as a centre-back.

== Club career ==
=== Early career ===
Born in Campos dos Goytacazes, Rio de Janeiro, Gil began his career with hometown side Rio Branco-RJ. In 2004, aged 17, he moved to Americano; after arriving as a defensive midfielder, he was converted into a centre-back by head coach Paulo Marcos.

After making his first team debut for Americano during the 2007 Campeonato Carioca, Gil spent a trial period at Vasco da Gama before being loaned out to Série C side Jaguaré in April of that year; at the club, he was known as Gilberto Balói. Despite not featuring in any league matches during their first stage elimination, he won the Copa Espírito Santo with the side as a starter.

Back to Americano for the 2008 season, Gil established himself as a first-choice at the club as they reached the Copa Rio finals. In June 2008, he was loaned to fellow third division side Atlético Goianiense for the remainder of the year.

A regular starter at Dragão, Gil was bought outright by the club ahead of the 2009 campaign, and was a target of Flamengo, Fluminense and Cruzeiro.

=== Cruzeiro ===
On 1 August 2009, Gil was announced at Cruzeiro. He made his club – and Série A – debut four days later, starting in a 2–0 home loss to Atlético Paranaense.

Gil started the 2010 season as a backup to Leonardo Silva and Caçapa, but soon overtook the latter. He scored his first goal for the club on 20 February of that year, netting the opener in a 3–1 away win over rivals Atlético Mineiro.

=== Valenciennes ===
In August 2011, Gil moved abroad for the first time in his career, after agreeing to a three-year deal with French Ligue 1 side Valenciennes, for a rumoured fee of € 3 million. He made his debut abroad late in the month, starting in a 3–2 away loss to Dijon, for the season's Coupe de la Ligue.

=== Corinthians ===
On 1 January 2013, Valenciennes reportedly accepted an €3.5 million offer from Corinthians, and was presented at his new club fifteen days later. He made his debut for the club on 23 January, starting in a 1–0 Campeonato Paulista home loss to Ponte Preta.

An immediate first-choice, Gil only scored his first goal for Timão on 26 February 2014, netting his side's third in a 3–0 home win over Comercial-SP. On 31 July 2014, he signed a new three-year contract with the club.

On 22 September 2015, still a key unit, Gil renewed his link with Corinthians until 2019.

=== Shandong Luneng ===
On 21 January 2016, Gil moved to Chinese club Shandong Luneng on a four-year contract, earning a rumoured monthly wage of US$ 400,000. A regular starter, he left the club on a mutual agreement on 30 June 2019, to return to his former club.

=== Corinthians return ===
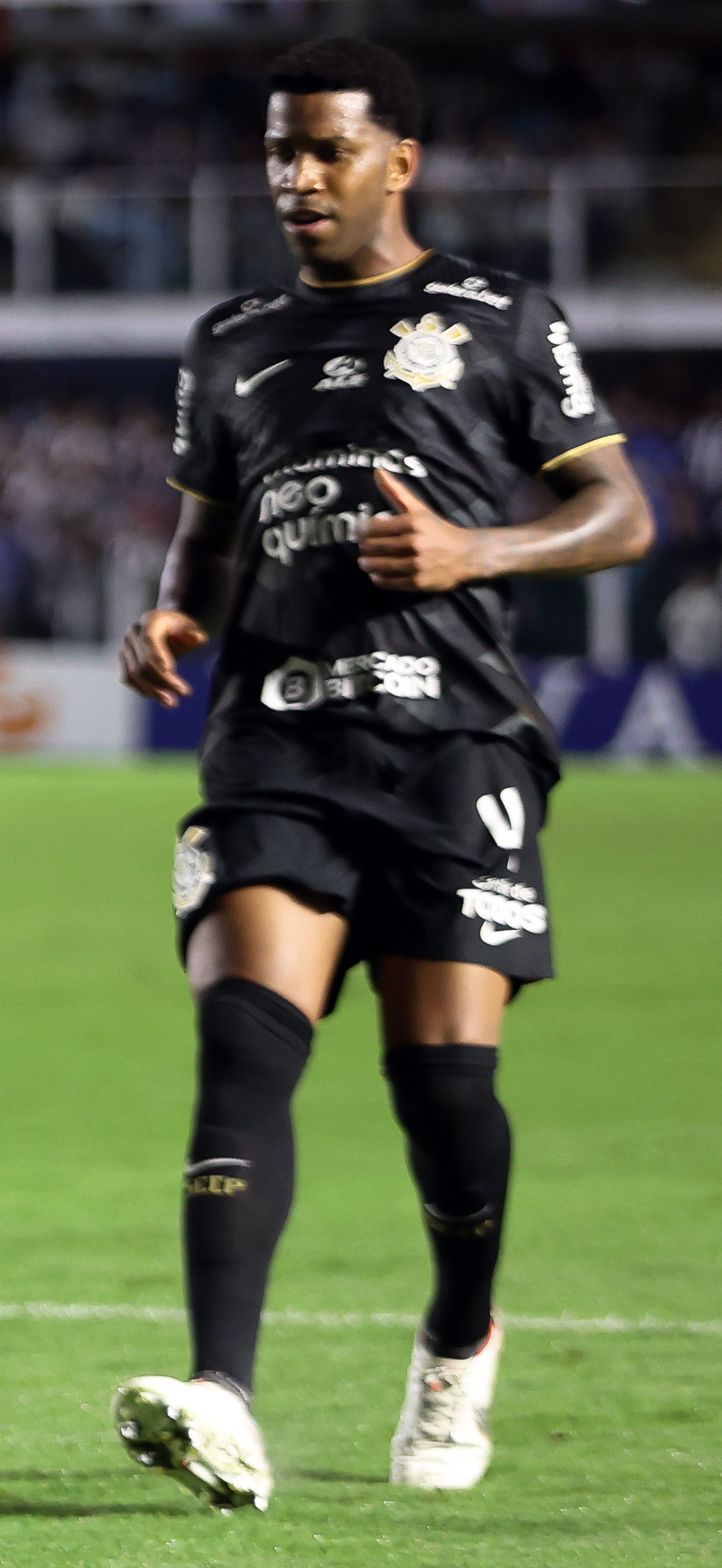
Gil with Corinthians in 2022

On 3 July 2019, Gil was announced back at Corinthians on a contract until the end of the year. The following 9 January, his link was extended until the end of 2022.

On 26 January 2022, still a first-choice, 34-year-old Gil renewed his contract with Corinthians for a further year. On 14 December 2023, he left the club after his contract was due to expire; he amassed 444 matches for Timão, scoring 19 goals.

=== Santos ===
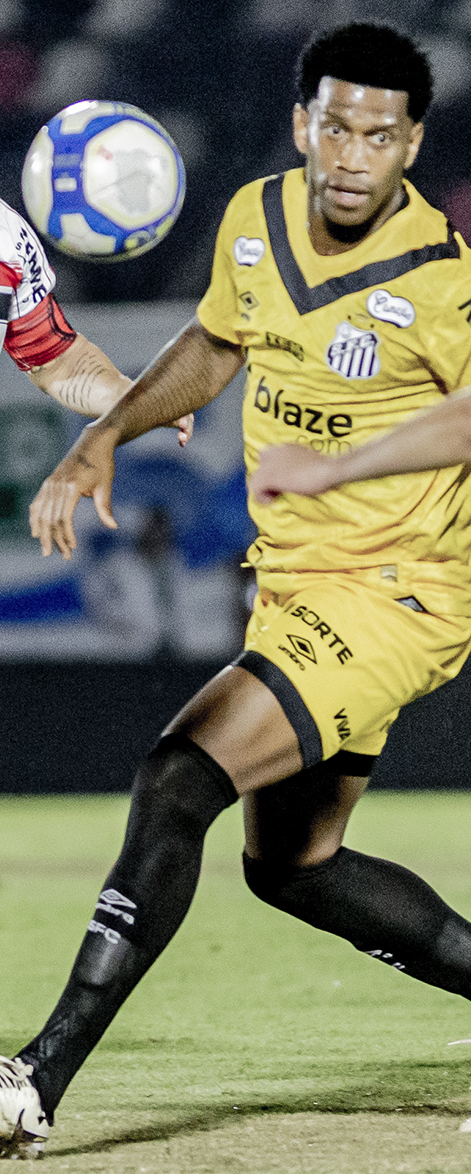
Gil in action for Santos in 2024

On 27 December 2023, Gil was announced at Santos on a one-year contract. He made his debut for the club the following 20 January, starting in a 1–0 away win over Botafogo-SP.

Gil scored his first goal for Peixe on 15 May 2024, netting the opener in a 2–1 away win over Ponte Preta. Despite being a regular starter in his first season, he lost his starting spot in his second, and rescinded his contract on 3 September 2025.

== International career ==
On 19 August 2014, Gil was called up to play for the Brazil national team by new manager Dunga for two friendlies against Colombia and Ecuador. He made his full international debut on 10 September, coming on as a late substitute for Danilo in a 1–0 win over the latter at the MetLife Stadium in East Rutherford, New Jersey.

Gil was also called up to the 2014 Superclásico de las Américas, coming on in the stoppage time for David Luiz as Brazil beat Argentina 2–0. He was placed in the standby list for the 2015 Copa América.

In May 2016, Gil was included in Dunga's 23-man squad for the Copa América Centenario. He featured in all three matches of Brazil's group stage exit.

In June 2017, after nearly a year away from international duties, Gil was recalled to the national team by Tite, who included the defender on his list for the first time. He made his return to the national team after nearly a full year in the 2017 Superclásico de las Américas, which ended in a 1–0 defeat to Argentina.

== Career statistics ==
=== Club ===
As of 11 August 2025.

Club	Season	League			State League		National Cup		Continental		Other		Total	
Club	Season	Division	Apps	Goals	Apps	Goals	Apps	Goals	Apps	Goals	Apps	Goals	Apps	Goals
Americano	2007	Carioca	—		8	0	0	0	—		—		8	0
Americano	2008	Carioca	—		15	2	—		—		11 (Note: Appearance(s) in Copa Rio)	0	28	2
Americano	Total		—		23	2	—		—		11	0	34	2
Jaguaré (loan)	2007	Série C	0	0	—		—		—		12 (Note: Appearance(s) in Copa Espírito Santo)	1	12	1
Atlético Goianiense	2008	Série C	27	5	—		—		—		—		27	5
Atlético Goianiense	2009	Série B	12	1	19	0	—		—		—		31	1
Atlético Goianiense	Total		39	6	19	0	—		—		—		58	6
Cruzeiro	2009	Série A	19	0	—		—		—		—		19	0
Cruzeiro	2010	Série A	24	1	9	1	—		10 (Note: Appearance(s) in Copa Libertadores)	0	—		43	2
Cruzeiro	2011	Série A	15	0	13	2	—		8	0	—		36	2
Cruzeiro	Total		58	1	22	2	—		18	0	—		98	4
Valenciennes	2011–12	Ligue 1	25	1	—		2	0	—		1 (Note: Appearance(s) in Coupe de la Ligue)	0	28	1
Valenciennes	2012–13	Ligue 1	15	1	—		0	0	—		0	0	15	1
Valenciennes	Total		40	2	—		2	0	—		1	0	43	2
Valenciennes II	2011–12	Championnat de France Amateur	2	1	—		—		—		—		2	1
Corinthians	2013	Série A	36	0	20	0	4	0	8	0	2 (Note: Appearance(s) in Recopa Sudamericana)	0	70	0
Corinthians	2014	Série A	34	4	14	1	6	0	—		—		54	5
Corinthians	2015	Série A	34	2	8	0	2	0	10	0	—		54	2
Corinthians	Total		104	6	42	1	12	0	18	0	2	0	178	7
Shandong Luneng	2016	Chinese Super League	27	0	—		2	0	10 (Note: Appearance(s) in AFC Champions League)	0	—		39	0
Shandong Luneng	2017	Chinese Super League	29	3	—		3	0	—		—		32	3
Shandong Luneng	2018	Chinese Super League	30	3	—		7	3	—		—		37	6
Shandong Luneng	2019	Chinese Super League	15	2	—		2	0	9	0	—		26	2
Shandong Luneng	Total		101	8	—		14	3	19	0	—		134	11
Corinthians	2019	Série A	29	1	—		—		6 (Note: Appearance(s) in Copa Sudamericana)	0	—		35	1
Corinthians	2020	Série A	36	2	15	2	2	0	2	0	—		55	4
Corinthians	2021	Série A	37	0	10	0	4	0	5	1	—		56	1
Corinthians	2022	Série A	25	0	12	1	8	1	6	0	—		51	2
Corinthians	2023	Série A	32	2	10	1	8	0	11 (Note: Five appearances in Copa Libertadores, six appearances and one goal in Copa Sudamericana)	1	—		61	4
Corinthians	Total		159	5	47	4	22	1	30	2	—		266	11
Santos	2024	Série B	34	1	16	0	—		—		—		50	1
Santos	2025	Série A	8	0	7	0	1	0	—		—		16	0
Santos	Total		42	1	23	0	1	0	—		—		66	1
Career total			545	30	176	9	51	4	85	2	26	1	883	46

=== International ===
As of 17 October 2018

Appearances and goals by national team and year
National team	Year	Apps	Goals
Brazil	2014	3	0
Brazil	2015	2	0
Brazil	2016	5	0
Brazil	2017	1	0
Total		11	0

== Honours ==
Jaguaré

- Copa Espírito Santo: 2007

Atlético Goianiense

- Campeonato Brasileiro Série C: 2008

Cruzeiro

- Campeonato Mineiro: 2009

Corinthians

- Campeonato Paulista: 2013
- Recopa Sudamericana: 2013
- Campeonato Brasileiro Série A: 2015

Santos

- Campeonato Brasileiro Série B: 2024

Brazil

- Superclásico de las Américas: 2014

=== Individual ===
- Best Centre-back in Brazil: 2015
- Campeonato Brasileiro Série A Team of the Year: 2014, 2015
- Campeonato Paulista Team of the Year: 2015
