= Graziano Pellè =

Italian footballer (born 1985)

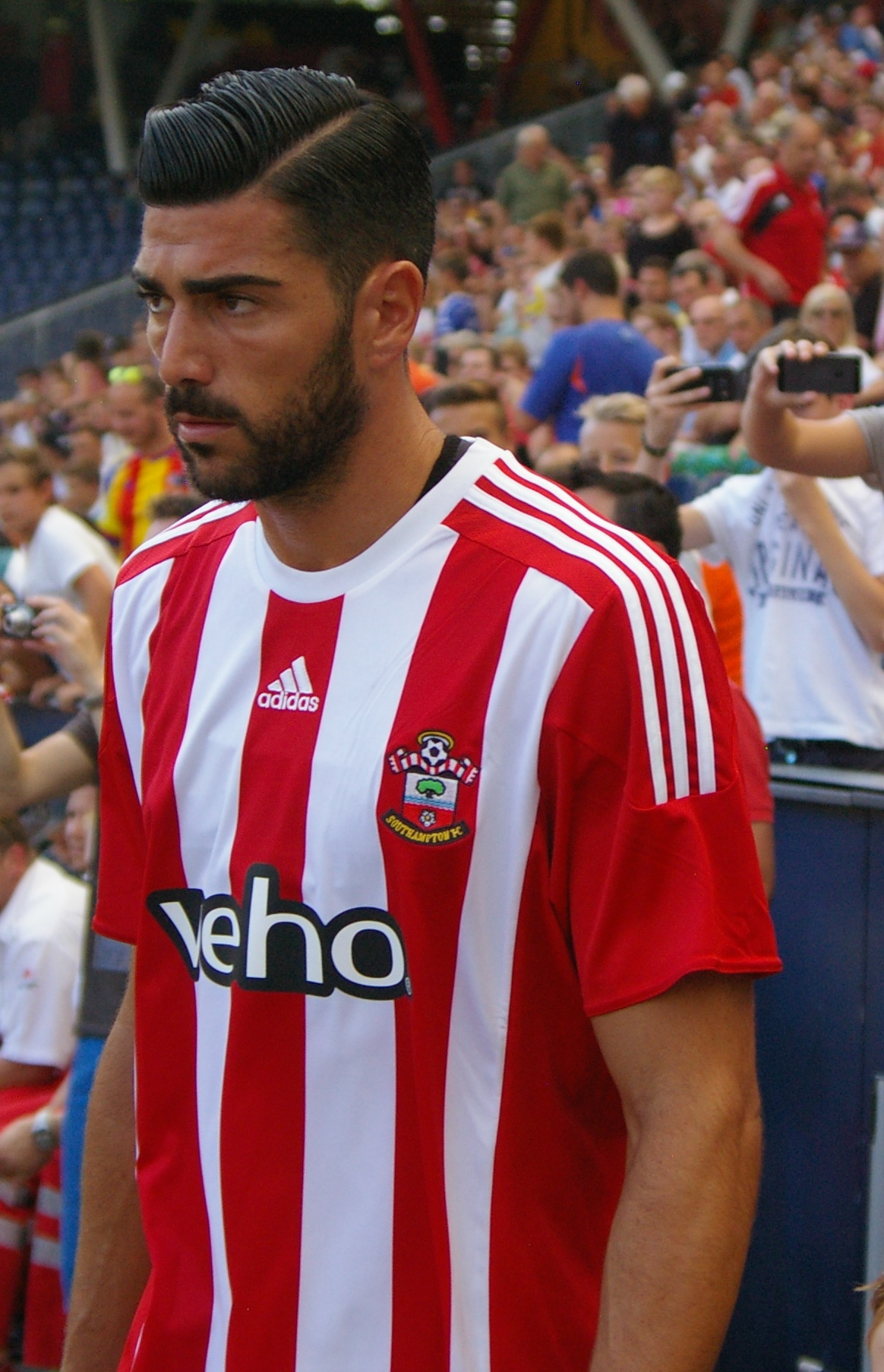
- Pellè with Southampton in 2015

Personal information
- Full name: Graziano Pellè
- Date of birth: 15 July 1985 (age 41)
- Place of birth: San Cesario di Lecce, Italy
- Height: 1.94 m (6 ft 4 in)
- Position: Striker

Youth career
- 2001–2004: Lecce

Senior career*
Years	Team	Apps	(Gls)
2004–2007	Lecce	12	(0)
2005	→ Catania (loan)	15	(0)
2006	→ Crotone (loan)	17	(6)
2006–2007	→ Cesena (loan)	38	(10)
2007–2011	AZ	78	(14)
2011–2013	Parma	12	(1)
2012	→ Sampdoria (loan)	16	(4)
2012–2013	→ Feyenoord (loan)	29	(27)
2013–2014	Feyenoord	28	(23)
2014–2016	Southampton	68	(23)
2016–2020	Shandong Luneng	106	(52)
2021	Parma	14	(2)
Total		433	(162)

International career
2004–2005	Italy U20	10	(7)
2005–2007	Italy U21	11	(0)
2008	Italy Olympic	5	(0)
2014–2016	Italy	20	(9)
- * Club domestic league appearances and goals

Graziano Pellè (Italian pronunciation: [ɡratˈtsjaːno pelˈlɛ]; born 15 July 1985) is an Italian former professional footballer who played as a striker.

Pellè began his career at local Serie A club Lecce, and was loaned to three lower-division sides before moving to the Dutch club AZ in 2007. He won the Eredivisie title in his second of four seasons at the club. After brief spells back in Italy with Parma and Sampdoria, he returned to the Dutch top flight, where his consistent scoring for Feyenoord earned Pellè an £8 million transfer to Southampton in July 2014. In July 2016, after two seasons in the Premier League, Pellè moved to Shandong Luneng for an estimated transfer fee of £12 million. He returned to Parma in February 2021.

Pellè represented Italy at under-20 and under-21 level. He also played for the nation's Olympic team in 2008, but was not selected for the tournament. He scored on his senior international debut in 2014 and was part of the Italian squad at UEFA Euro 2016, where he scored two goals before being eliminated in the quarter-final.

== Club career ==
=== Lecce ===
Born in San Cesario di Lecce, Province of Lecce, Pellè is from Monteroni di Lecce. He could have chosen ballroom dancing as his profession after becoming national under-12s champion in partnership with his sister Fabiana. He started playing for local club Lecce's youth teams; his father Roberto was a striker for Lecce in Serie C. Graziano won two Campionato Primavera titles and the 2002 Coppa Italia Primavera. He made his Serie A debut on 11 January 2004 in a 1–2 home defeat against Bologna, making a total of two appearances in the season.

In January 2005, Pellè was loaned out to Catania in Serie B, being regularly used but failing to find the net. In the summer, he participated in the 2005 FIFA World Youth Championship with the under-20 team, scoring four goals in an eventual quarter-final exit, and returned to Lecce for the 2005–06 campaign, only to be loaned again in the winter transfer window, again to the second division, now to Crotone.

In 2006–07 Pellè was yet again loaned to a level two club, this time to Cesena, where he had a breakthrough year with ten goals.

=== AZ ===
In July 2007, Pellè left Lecce and signed for Eredivisie outfit AZ. He stated in an interview that he had a choice of staying at Lecce, who would loan him to Palermo, but chose the Alkmaar club instead because of its willingness to give chances to young players. His debut season, however, was largely unfruitful, as he struggled to replace PSV-bound Danny Koevermans, and finished his first season with just 3 goals in 27 games (16 starts).

On 28 December 2008, Pellè scored the winning goal in a 1–0 win against NEC. In February of the following year, he netted twice in a 3–0 home success over Groningen, but was overall sparingly used by the North Holland side over the course of four Eredivisie seasons, being released in June 2011.

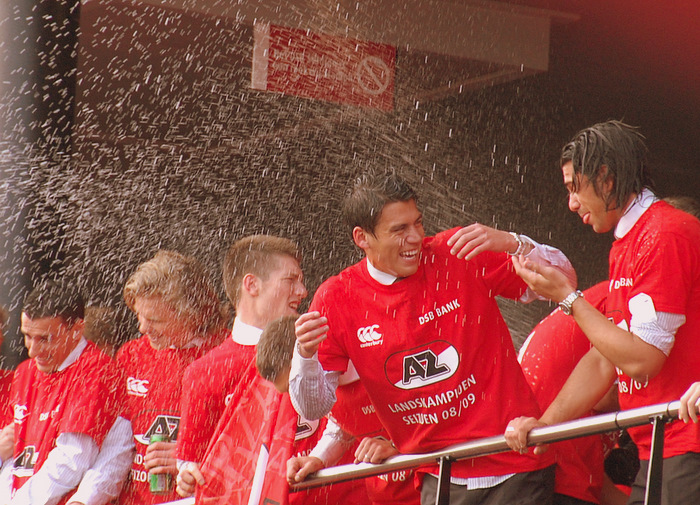
Pellè (far left) among the AZ players celebrating their Eredivisie win in 2009

=== Parma ===
In early July 2011, Parma confirmed through its official website that Pellè had signed a multi-year contract with the club. He scored one goal during his time at Parma, netting its second goal in a come-from-behind 3–3 draw with his former club Lecce on 18 December 2011; this was his first goal in Serie A. On 31 January 2012, Pellè joined Sampdoria on loan in the second division, scoring 4 goals in 16 appearances for the club to help it earn promotion back to Serie A for 2012–13.

=== Feyenoord ===
For the 2012–13 season, still owned by Parma, Pellè returned to the Netherlands, joining Feyenoord to become the first Italian to play for the club. He scored 11 goals in his first ten games, including a last-minute strike in a 2–2 home draw against Ajax and both goals in a 2–0 success over RKC Waalwijk, also at De Kuip. On 23 December, he scored twice more as Feyenoord beat Groningen 2–1 in the last game of the Eredivisie season before the winter break.

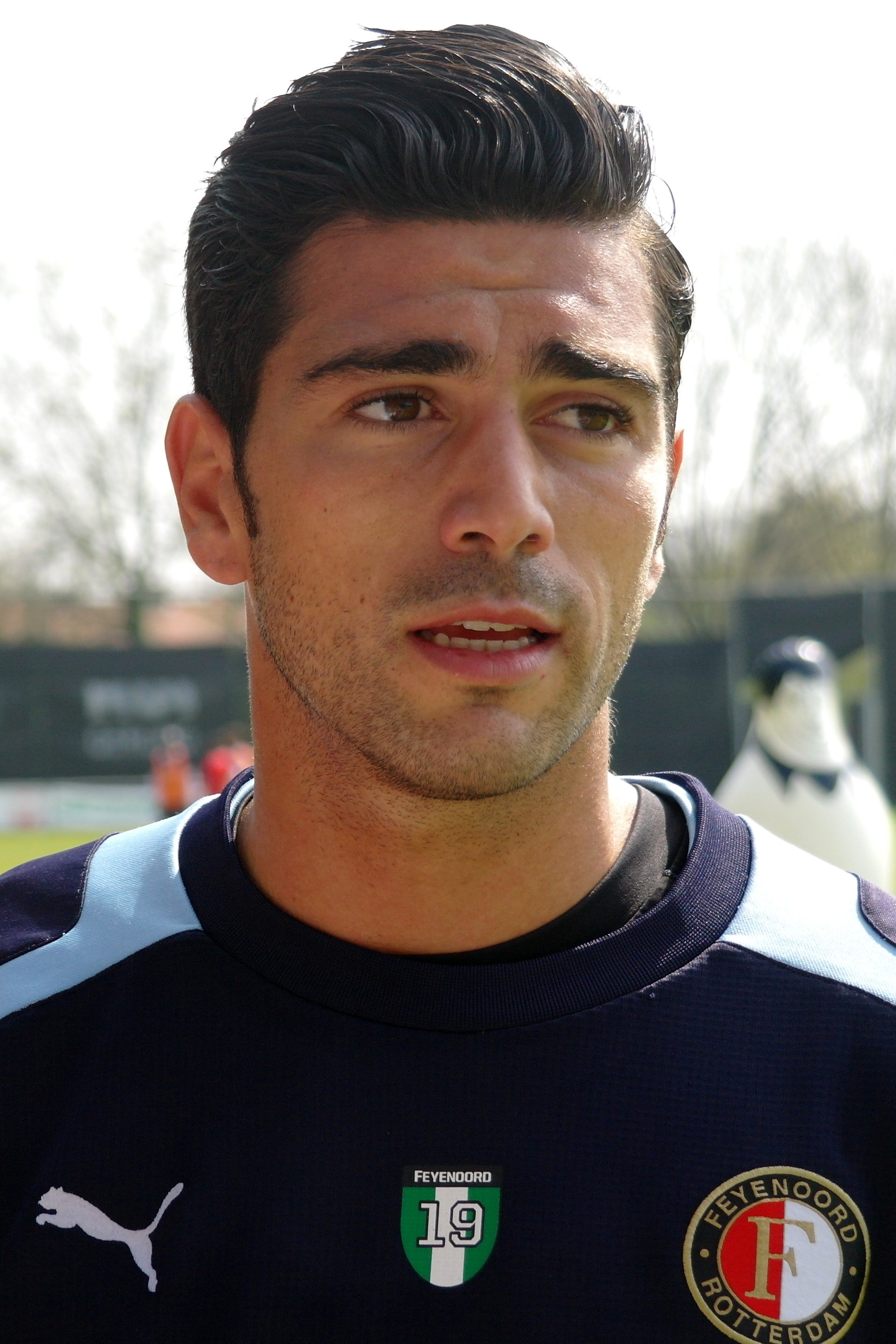
Pellè in training with Feyenoord in 2013

On 5 January 2013, Pellè signed a four-year contract with the Rotterdam club, to be effective 1 July. His first goal since securing a permanent move to Feyenoord came on 30 January, scoring on a pass from Jean-Paul Boëtius as Feyenoord eventually fell to a 2–1 defeat to PSV. On 28 April, he scored a first-half brace as Feyenoord notched a 6–0 victory over Heracles. At the end of the campaign, he had netted 27 league goals, ranking second in the domestic charts and also surpassing the recent records of Italian scorers in a foreign league – Luca Toni (Bayern Munich) and Christian Vieri (Atlético Madrid) – in the process.

Pellè was also famous for his "retro" haircut among Feyenoord fans. In home games, many fans showed the same haircut as Pellè and there are still some tutorials on YouTube that teach how to arrange his hairstyle.

Pellè netted all three goals for Feyenoord on 25 August 2013, notching a 3–1 win over NAC Breda, and securing the club's first points of the new Eredivisie season. He opened the scoring for Feyenoord in the seventh minute of their UEFA Europa League second leg play-off match against Kuban Krasnodar to bring the sides level at 1–1 on aggregate, but the Dutch side conceded twice and fell to a 3–1 aggregate defeat. He scored another hat-trick for Feyenoord on 29 September 2013, scoring with each foot and from the penalty spot as the Rotterdam side defeated ADO Den Haag 4–2. He scored twice more on 1 December, netting in either half as Feyenoord defeated rivals PSV 3–1.

On 8 February 2014, Pellè scored twice and also missed a penalty as Feyenoord came from a goal down to defeat NEC 5–1. On 2 March, he opened the scoring with a header from a Bruno Martins Indi cross, but retrospectively received a red card for an elbow to the face of Joël Veltman and a four-match ban as Feyenoord fell 2–1 to rivals Ajax. After sitting out the ban, Pellè returned to the team on 6 April and scored a brace in Feyenoord's 2–0 win over RKC Waalwijk. His 15th and last league goal for Feyenoord came on 27 April, nodding in a Ruud Vormer corner as Feyenoord defeated Cambuur 5–1.

=== Southampton ===
==== 2014–15 season ====
Pellè signed a three-year deal for £8 million with Premier League side Southampton in July 2014, reuniting him with his former AZ and Feyenoord coach Ronald Koeman. Pellè made his competitive debut for the club on 17 August in its first game of the new league season, playing the full 90 minutes of a 2–1 defeat at Liverpool. On 26 August, he scored his first competitive goal for the club in a 2–0 victory over Millwall in the Second Round of the League Cup. His first league goal for the club came four days later in a 3–1 away win over West Ham United. He scored twice more in Southampton's next match, a 4–0 home win over Newcastle United on 13 September, to secure its second league win in as many games. On 27 September, Pellè won a match for Southampton against Queens Park Rangers with an overhead kick, which was later deemed "world class" by opposing manager Harry Redknapp.

Pellè won the Premier League Player of the Month award for September, with Koeman named the Manager of the Month, and he followed this up with two goals in an 8–0 victory over Sunderland on 18 October. He scored another brace in a League Cup victory over Stoke City on 29 October, helping his side reach the quarter-finals of the competition for the first time in ten years. These were his 8th and 9th goals in his last 12 games.

On 11 April 2015, Pellè scored his first Premier League goal of the year in a 2–0 win over Hull City at St. Mary's Stadium, ending a run of 15 league matches without scoring. Two weeks later, in a 2–2 draw against Tottenham Hotspur, Pellè scored both goals for his team; a strike after overpowering Ben Davies, and a header from a cross by Shane Long.

==== 2015–16 season ====
Pellè scored Southampton's first goal in a European competition since 2003 when he opened a 3–0 Europa League third qualifying round home leg win over Vitesse on 30 July 2015. A week later, it took him four minutes to open a 2–0 win in the away leg. In Southampton's first match of the league season, away to Newcastle, he headed in right-back Cédric's cross to open a 2–2 draw. He scored twice against Manchester United on 20 September, albeit in a 2–3 home loss. Pellè then scored his fifth of the season against Chelsea in a 3–1 win at Stamford Bridge, scoring Southampton's third goal of the match from a tight angle.

=== Shandong Luneng ===
Pellè left Southampton for Chinese club Shandong Luneng on 11 July 2016, for an estimated fee of £12 million. He became the world's seventh-highest paid footballer, earning £350,000 per week. Pellè made his debut for the club in a 1–1 draw with Liaoning Whowin on 16 July 2016. Four days later, he scored his first goal in a 4–1 victory over Hangzhou Greentown.

=== Return to Parma ===
On 5 February 2021, Pellè agreed to a return to Parma on a six-month deal. On 19 March, almost 10 years since his last goal in Serie A, Pellé scored with an overhead kick in Parma's match against Genoa.

== International career ==
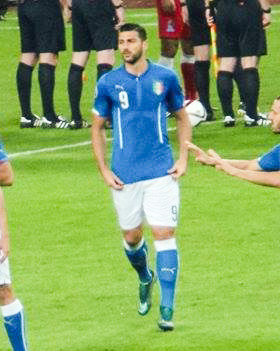
Pellè playing for Italy against Azerbaijan in 2015.

Pellè scored four goals for Italy under-20 at the 2005 FIFA World Youth Championship in the Netherlands, including a brace in their 4–1 group stage win over Canada. He also netted an extra-time equaliser for a 2–2 draw with Morocco in the quarter-finals, and converted in the penalty shootout which his team lost nonetheless.

After a successful loan spell with Cesena, Pellè earned a call-up to the Italian under-21 side at the 2007 UEFA European Under-21 Football Championship, where he collected three appearances, all as a substitute. In the fifth-place playoff match against Portugal, he scored the first penalty kick in the shootout win, with a Panenka-style penalty. The win secured Italy the final European spot at the 2008 Olympic Games in Beijing. He was part of the preparation for the tournament but was ultimately not selected to the final 22-man squad for the Olympics.

On 4 October 2014, Pellè received his first call up to the Italy senior side for the Azzurri's UEFA Euro 2016 qualifying matches against Azerbaijan and Malta. He made his debut as a starter away to Malta on 13 October 2014, scoring the only goal of the game from close range after a corner in the 29th minute. He netted a second goal in the 29th minute on his third appearance on 31 March 2015, heading Italy into the lead in a 1–1 friendly draw against England at Juventus Stadium in Turin. On 3 September 2015, he finished Antonio Candreva's cross for the only goal of the home qualifier against Malta in Florence. He scored the match-winning goal in Italy's 2–1 home win over Norway on 13 October, which allowed Italy to top their Euro 2016 qualifying group and extended their unbeaten run in European qualifying to 50 matches; Pellè was also Italy's top scorer during the qualifying campaign, with three goals.

On 31 May 2016, Pellè was included in Italy manager Antonio Conte's 23-man squad for Euro 2016. In Italy's opening game, on 13 June against Europe's top-ranked team Belgium in Lyon, Pellè played the full match and volleyed a strike into the back of the net in added time for a 2–0 win. In the round of 16 at Stade de France in Paris on 27 June, he struck a volley in the 91st minute to give the Azzurri a 2–0 win over defending champions Spain. On 2 July, he missed a penalty in a 6–5 shoot-out defeat to defending World Cup champions Germany in the tournament quarter-finals. In the events after the match, Pellè issued an apology to the fans of the national team stating, "Does my European Championship remain positive? I couldn't care less right now, I am just sad and want to apologise to all Italians. If I had scored that penalty, I'd have become a phenomenon, but instead... I arrived here as a nobody and I leave as a nobody." He also denied provoking Germany goalkeeper Manuel Neuer by making the "chip" gesture.

Although moving his football career to China over the summer, new coach Gian Piero Ventura called Pellè back for international duty for a friendly against France and a 2018 FIFA World Cup qualifier against Israel on 1 and 5 September 2016, scoring in both matches, as Italy suffered a 3–1 home defeat to France but defeated Israel away, 3–1. He was called again for World Cup qualifying matches against Spain and Macedonia on 6 and 9 October, however he was later excluded from the Macedonia match after being substituted in the 59th minute during the Spain game and refusing to shake the hand of coach Ventura.

== Style of play ==
Described as a traditional "target-man" with an eye for goal, Pellè is a large, strong and hard-working striker who excels in the air due to his height and physical attributes. As a centre-forward, he is known for his powerful and accurate finishing ability with his head and feet, as well as his accurate volleys and penalty-kick taking; he is also capable of using his strength and solid first touch to hold up the ball with his back to goal, and either link-up with other players or create chances for teammates. Labelled as a "late bloomer" by sportswriter James Horncastle, Pellè's playing style and characteristics have led him to be compared to compatriot Luca Toni in the Italian media. Pellè has also drawn praise in the media for his work-rate off the ball, and has been described as a mobile forward, who chases down and presses his opponents.

== Personal life ==
In the summer of 2022, he married Hungarian fashion model Viktória Varga, his partner for several years. On 3 December 2024, the couple separated after two years of marriage and a 12-year relationship.

== Career statistics ==
=== Club ===
Appearances and goals by club, season and competition
Club	Season	League			Cup (Note: Includes cup competitions such as Coppa Italia, KNVB Cup, FA Cup and Chinese FA Cup)		League Cup		Continental		Total	
Club	Season	Division	Apps	Goals	Apps	Goals	Apps	Goals	Apps	Goals	Apps	Goals
Lecce	2003–04	Serie A	2	0	0	0	—		—		2	0
Lecce	2005–06	Serie A	10	0	1	0	—		—		11	0
Lecce	Total		12	0	1	0	—		—		13	0
Catania (loan)	2004–05	Serie B	15	0	0	0	—		—		15	0
Crotone (loan)	2005–06	Serie B	17	6	—		—		—		17	6
Cesena (loan)	2006–07	Serie B	38	10	2	1	—		—		40	11
AZ	2007–08	Eredivisie	27	3	1	0	—		4 (Note: All appearances in UEFA Cup)	1	32	4
AZ	2008–09	Eredivisie	20	3	3	1	—		—		23	4
AZ	2009–10	Eredivisie	13	2	1	0	—		5 (Note: All appearances in UEFA Champions League)	0	19	2
AZ	2010–11	Eredivisie	18	6	2	0	—		0	0	20	6
AZ	Total		78	14	7	1	—		9	1	94	16
Parma	2011–12	Serie A	11	1	2	1	—		—		13	2
Parma	2012–13	Serie A	1	0	0	0	—		—		1	0
Parma	Total		12	1	2	1	—		—		14	2
Sampdoria (loan)	2011–12	Serie B	16	4	0	0	—		—		16	4
Feyenoord (loan)	2012–13	Eredivisie	29	27	4	2	—		—		33	29
Feyenoord	2013–14	Eredivisie	28	23	3	2	—		2 (Note: All appearances in Europa League)	1	33	26
Feyenoord	Total		57	50	7	4	—		2	1	66	55
Southampton	2014–15	Premier League	38	12	3	1	3	3	—		44	16
Southampton	2015–16	Premier League	30	11	0	0	2	1	4 (Note: All appearances in UEFA Europa League)	2	37	14
Southampton	Total		68	23	3	1	5	4	4	2	81	30
Shandong Luneng	2016	Chinese Super League	13	5	0	0	—		2 (Note: All appearances in AFC Champions League)	0	15	5
Shandong Luneng	2017	Chinese Super League	24	6	2	0	—		—		26	6
Shandong Luneng	2018	Chinese Super League	26	16	6	0	—		—		32	16
Shandong Luneng	2019	Chinese Super League	25	17	5	3	—		8	7	40	27
Shandong Luneng	2020	Chinese Super League	18	8	4	1	—		—		22	9
Shandong Luneng	Total		106	52	17	4	—		10	7	133	63
Parma	2020–21	Serie A	13	1	0	0	—		—		13	1
Career total			432	161	39	11	5	4	27	11	500	188

=== International ===
Appearances and goals by national team and year
National team	Year	Apps	Goals
Italy
Italy	2014	2	1
Italy	2015	8	3
Italy	2016	10	5
Total		20	9

=== International goals ===
Italy score listed first, score column indicates score after each Pellè goal.

International goals by date, venue, opponent, score, result and competition
No.	Date	Venue	Opponent	Score	Result	Competition
1	13 October 2014	Ta' Qali National Stadium, Mdina, Malta	Malta	1–0	1–0	UEFA Euro 2016 qualifying
2	31 March 2015	Juventus Stadium, Turin, Italy	England	1–0	1–1	Friendly
3	3 September 2015	Stadio Artemio Franchi, Florence, Italy	Malta	1–0	1–0	UEFA Euro 2016 qualifying
4	13 October 2015	Stadio Olimpico, Rome, Italy	Norway	2–1	2–1	UEFA Euro 2016 qualifying
5	29 May 2016	Ta' Qali National Stadium, Mdina, Malta	Scotland	1–0	1–0	Friendly
6	13 June 2016	Parc Olympique Lyonnais, Lyon, France	Belgium	2–0	2–0	UEFA Euro 2016
7	27 June 2016	Stade de France, Saint-Denis, France	Spain	2–0	2–0	UEFA Euro 2016
8	1 September 2016	Stadio San Nicola, Bari, Italy	France	1–1	1–3	Friendly
9	5 September 2016	Sammy Ofer Stadium, Haifa, Israel	Israel	1–0	3–1	2018 FIFA World Cup qualification

== Honours ==
AZ

- Eredivisie: 2008–09

Shandong Luneng Taishan

- Chinese FA Cup: 2020

Italy U21

- Toulon Tournament: 2008

Individual

- Voetbal International Player of the Year: 2012–13
- Premier League Player of the Month: September 2014
- Chinese Super League Team of the Year: 2019
