= Tian Xin =

Chinese association football player

Personal information
- Date of birth: 29 March 1998 (age 28)
- Place of birth: Ürümqi, Xinjiang, China
- Height: 1.76 m (5 ft 9 in)
- Position: Midfielder

Senior career*
Years	Team	Apps	(Gls)
2018–2024	Shandong Taishan	21	(0)
2023	→ Tai'an Tiankuang(loan)	13	(2)
2025	Tai'an Tiankuang	10	(2)

International career
2020	China U23	2	(0)
- * Club domestic league appearances and goals as of 17:14, 31 January 2023 (UTC)

Tian Xin (Chinese: 田鑫; pinyin: Tián Xīn; born 29 March 1998) is a Chinese footballer currently playing as a midfielder.

== Club career ==
Tian Xin was promoted to the senior team of Shandong Luneng within the 2018 Chinese Super League season, but he would have to wait until 9 March 2019 to make his debut, which was in a league game against Henan Jianye that ended in a 2-2 draw. This would be followed by his first goal for the club on 1 May 2019 in a Chinese FA Cup game against Zhejiang Energy Greentown that ended in a 2-1 victory.

Tian Xin would be used as a squad player within the team and would gain his first Chinese FA Cup by winning the 2020 Chinese FA Cup against Jiangsu Suning in a 2-0 victory. This would be followed by his first league title with the club when he was part of the team that won the 2021 Chinese Super League title. Another Chinese FA Cup would be followed up by him winning the 2022 Chinese FA Cup with them.

In March 2025, Tian joined China League Two club Tai'an Tiankuang.

== Career statistics ==
As of 31 January 2023.

Club	Season	League			Cup		Continental		Other		Total	
Club	Season	Division	Apps	Goals	Apps	Goals	Apps	Goals	Apps	Goals	Apps	Goals
Shandong Luneng/ Shandong Taishan	2018	Chinese Super League	0	0	0	0	–		–		0	0
Shandong Luneng/ Shandong Taishan	2019	Chinese Super League	7	0	1	1	0	0	–		8	1
Shandong Luneng/ Shandong Taishan	2020	Chinese Super League	1	0	1	0	–		–		2	0
Shandong Luneng/ Shandong Taishan	2021	Chinese Super League	4	0	6	2	-		-		10	2
Shandong Luneng/ Shandong Taishan	2022	Chinese Super League	3	0	0	0	0	0	-		3	0
Shandong Luneng/ Shandong Taishan	Total		15	0	8	3	0	0	0	0	23	3
Career total			15	0	8	3	0	0	0	0	23	3

== Honours ==
=== Club ===
Shandong Luneng/ Shandong Taishan

- Chinese Super League: 2021.
- Chinese FA Cup: 2020, 2021, 2022.
