= Li Hailong =

Chinese footballer

Li Hailong 李海龙
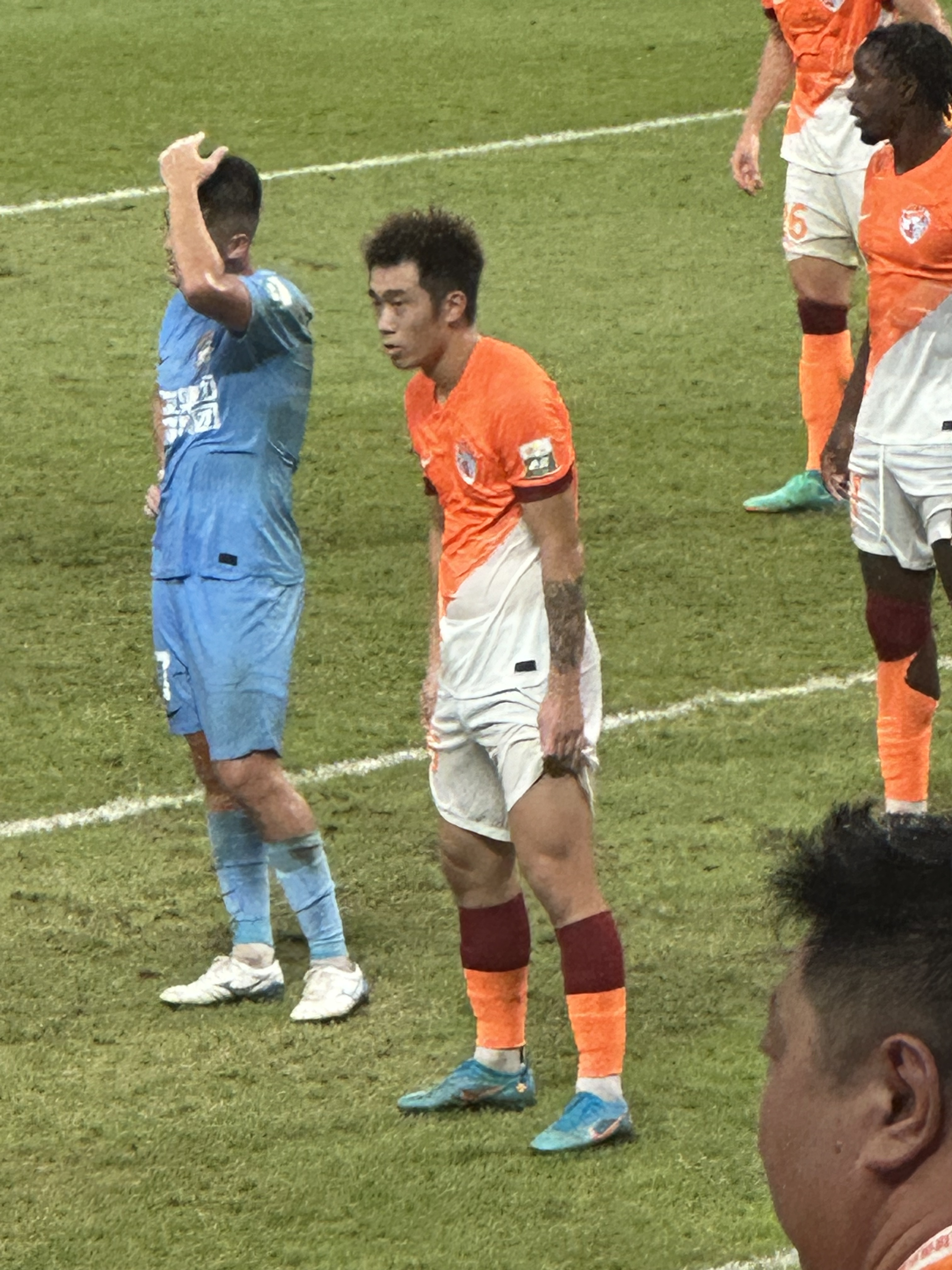
- Li in 2024

Personal information
- Date of birth: 2 August 1996 (age 30)
- Place of birth: Linyi, Shandong, China
- Height: 1.81 m (5 ft 11 in)
- Position: Defender

Team information
- Current team: Qingdao Hainiu
- Number: 16

Youth career
- Shandong Luneng
- 2014–2015: → Sacavenense (loan)

Senior career*
Years	Team	Apps	(Gls)
2014–2015	Sacavenense	2	(0)
2016	Torreense	5	(0)
2016–2023	Shandong Taishan	46	(1)
2024–	Qingdao Hainiu	44	(0)

International career^{‡}
2017–2018	China U-23	10	(0)
- * Club domestic league appearances and goals as of 22 November 2026 ‡ National team caps and goals as of 19 August 2018

Li Hailong (Chinese: 李海龙; pinyin: Lǐ Hǎilóng; born 2 August 1996) is a Chinese professional footballer who plays as a defender for Qingdao Hainiu in the Chinese Super League.

== Club career ==
Li Hailong was sent to Portugal for further training by Chinese Super League side Shandong Luneng (now renamed Shandong Taishan) in 2014. He joined Campeonato de Portugal side Sacavenense in the summer of 2014 and played in both senior team and U-19 team. On 12 February 2015, he made his senior debut in a 3–1 home win against Pinhalnovense. Li moved to another Campeonato de Portugal club Torreense in January 2016. He made his debut for Torreense on 21 February 2016 in a 0–0 draw against Eléctrico, coming on as a substitute for Yang Ailong in the 65th minute.

Li returned to Shandong Luneng and was promoted to the first team squad by Felix Magath in July 2016. On 24 July 2016, he made his debut for Shandong in a 1–0 home defeat against Shanghai Shenhua, coming on for Qi Tianyu in the 62nd minute. He would be used as a consistent squad player within the team and would gain his first league title with the club when he was part of the team that won the 2021 Chinese Super League title. This would be followed up by him winning the 2022 Chinese FA Cup with them the next season.

== Career statistics ==
As of match played 1 January 2026

Appearances and goals by club, season and competition
Club	Season	League			National cup		Continental		Other		Total	
Club	Season	Division	Apps	Goals	Apps	Goals	Apps	Goals	Apps	Goals	Apps	Goals
Sacavenense	2014–15	Campeonato de Portugal	2	0	0	0	–		–		2	0
Torreense	2015–16	Campeonato de Portugal	5	0	0	0	–		–		5	0
Shandong Luneng/ Shandong Taishan	2016	Chinese Super League	1	0	0	0	0	0	–		1	0
Shandong Luneng/ Shandong Taishan	2017	Chinese Super League	9	0	0	0	–		–		9	0
Shandong Luneng/ Shandong Taishan	2018	Chinese Super League	5	0	1	0	–		–		6	0
Shandong Luneng/ Shandong Taishan	2019	Chinese Super League	4	0	0	0	0	0	–		4	0
Shandong Luneng/ Shandong Taishan	2020	Chinese Super League	1	0	2	0	–		–		3	0
Shandong Luneng/ Shandong Taishan	2021	Chinese Super League	2	0	1	0	–		–		3	0
Shandong Luneng/ Shandong Taishan	2022	Chinese Super League	14	1	2	0	0	0	–		16	1
Shandong Luneng/ Shandong Taishan	2023	Chinese Super League	10	0	0	0	4 (Note: Appearances in 2023–24 AFC Champions League)	0	–		14	0
Shandong Luneng/ Shandong Taishan	Total		46	1	6	0	4	0	0	0	56	1
Qingdao Hainiu	2024	Chinese Super League	22	0	2	0	–		–		24	0
Qingdao Hainiu	2025	Chinese Super League	6	0	0	0	–		–		6	0
Qingdao Hainiu	Total		28	0	2	0	0	0	0	0	30	0
Career total			81	1	8	0	4	0	0	0	91	1

== Honours ==
Shandong Luneng, Shandong Taishan

- Chinese Super League: 2021
- Chinese FA Cup: 2020, 2021, 2022.
