= Dai Lin =

Chinese footballer

Dai Lin 戴琳
Personal information
- Full name: Dai Lin
- Date of birth: 28 November 1987 (age 38)
- Place of birth: Dalian, Liaoning, China
- Height: 1.91 m (6 ft 3 in)
- Position: Centre-back

Youth career
- 2003–2004: Dalian Yiteng
- 2004–2005: Liaoning FC

Senior career*
Years	Team	Apps	(Gls)
2005–2008	Liaoning FC	72	(1)
2009	Slavija Sarajevo	0	(0)
2009–2013	Shanghai Shenhua	110	(4)
2014–2022	Shandong Taishan	142	(5)
2023	Jinan Xingzhou	12	(0)

International career^{‡}
2007–2008	China U23	7	(0)
2010–2014	China	2	(0)
- * Club domestic league appearances and goals as of 31 January 2023 ‡ National team caps and goals as of 22 March 2015

Dai Lin (Chinese: 戴琳; pinyin: Dài Lín; Mandarin pronunciation: [tâɪ lǐn]; born 28 November 1987) is a Chinese former footballer who played as a centre-back.

== Club career ==
Dai Lin started his football career with Liaoning FC in 2005 and made his debut against Changsha Ginde on 14 April 2005 in a 2–0 win. As a versatile player, Dai quickly established himself within the team throughout the 2005 league season and scored his first goal against Tianjin Teda on 16 July 2005 in a 1–0 win. He remained with the team for several further seasons when he helped Liaoning to several midtable positions until the 2008 season which saw Liaoning relegated after a disappointing season when they were relegated on the last day of the season. Despite this setback, Dai still attracted the interests from Bosnian Premier League side FK Slavija while his transfer listed price stood at £356,212. After deciding not to renew his contract with Liaoning, it was believed that he would train with FK Slavija for the start of the new season while the transfer went through. He went back to China to sign with top tier side Shanghai Shenhua halfway through the 2009 season after only two months with FK Slavija at a very surprising cut-price deal that saw him go for just £44,000.

Dai was quickly inserted into the team and would make his debut in a league game on 2 August 2009 against Jiangsu Sainty where he came on as a substitute for Aleksander Rodić in a 2–2 draw. After that game, he would quickly go on to become a regular member of the team and score his first goal for the club against Tianjin Teda in a league game on 20 September 2009 in a 4–0 victory; however, his poor disciplinary record saw him limited to only twelve games throughout the season. The following season Dai would show more maturity in defence and become a vital member within the team throughout the 2010 league season. This then saw the new manager Xi Zhikang name Dai as the club's new captain at the beginning of the 2011 league season. As the campaign went on, Shanghai would struggle within the league and Dai's performances would come into question after a 2–0 defeat to Shenzhen Ruby on 31 July 2011 when it was discovered that he was having relationship problems. This would eventually see him stripped of the captaincy when Jean Tigana arrived at the club at the beginning of the 2012 league season.

On 1 January 2014, Dai transferred to fellow Chinese Super League side Shandong Luneng (now known as Shandong Taishan). He made his debut for the club in a 1–0 win against Harbin Yiteng on 7 March 2014. He would go on to establish himself as an integral member within the team and was part of the squads that won the 2014 Chinese FA Cup and 2020 Chinese FA Cup, both against Jiangsu Suning F.C. He would go on to be used as a squad player within the team and would gain his first league title with the club when he was part of the team that won the 2021 Chinese Super League title. This would be followed up by him winning the 2022 Chinese FA Cup with them the next season.

On 13 November 2024, Dai announced his retirement from professional football through his social media account.

== International career ==
After gaining considerable playing time with Liaoning FC, Dai would soon be included into the Chinese under-23 national team and would take part in the 2007 Lunar New Year Cup and the 2007 Toulon Tournament where he twice saw his side lose in the final. He would eventually be called up to the China national football team once he became an integral member of the Shanghai Shenhua's defence and go on to make his debut against Latvia on 11 November 2010 where he came on as a substitute in a 1–0 victory.

== Career statistics ==
As of 31 January 2023.

Appearances and goals by club, season and competition
Club	Season	League			National Cup		League Cup		Continental		Other		Total	
Club	Season	Division	Apps	Goals	Apps	Goals	Apps	Goals	Apps	Goals	Apps	Goals	Apps	Goals
Liaoning	2005	Chinese Super League	23	1	3	0	4	0	-		-		30	1
Liaoning	2006	Chinese Super League	19	0	1	0	-		-		-		20	0
Liaoning	2007	Chinese Super League	10	0	-		-		-		-		10	0
Liaoning	2008	Chinese Super League	20	0	-		-		-		-		20	0
Liaoning	Total		72	1	4	0	4	0	0	0	0	0	80	1
Slavija Sarajevo	2008-09	Premier League	0	0	0	0	-		0	0	-		0	0
Shanghai Shenhua	2009	Chinese Super League	12	1	-		-		0	0	-		12	1
Shanghai Shenhua	2010	Chinese Super League	23	1	-		-		-		-		23	1
Shanghai Shenhua	2011	Chinese Super League	23	1	2	0	-		5	0	-		30	1
Shanghai Shenhua	2012	Chinese Super League	23	1	2	0	-		-		-		25	1
Shanghai Shenhua	2013	Chinese Super League	29	0	0	0	-		-		-		29	0
Shanghai Shenhua	Total		110	4	4	0	0	0	5	0	0	0	119	4
Shandong Luneng/ Shandong Taishan	2014	Chinese Super League	27	1	3	0	-		4	0	-		34	1
Shandong Luneng/ Shandong Taishan	2015	Chinese Super League	14	0	2	0	-		5	0	1 (Note: Appearances in Chinese FA Super Cup)	0	22	0
Shandong Luneng/ Shandong Taishan	2016	Chinese Super League	21	2	1	0	-		12	0	-		34	2
Shandong Luneng/ Shandong Taishan	2017	Chinese Super League	28	0	4	0	-		-		-		32	0
Shandong Luneng/ Shandong Taishan	2018	Chinese Super League	24	0	6	0	-		-		-		30	0
Shandong Luneng/ Shandong Taishan	2019	Chinese Super League	20	1	3	0	-		8	0	-		31	1
Shandong Luneng/ Shandong Taishan	2020	Chinese Super League	3	0	4	0	-		-		-		7	0
Shandong Luneng/ Shandong Taishan	2021	Chinese Super League	1	1	4	0	-		-		-		5	1
Shandong Luneng/ Shandong Taishan	2022	Chinese Super League	4	0	0	0	-		0	0	-		4	0
Shandong Luneng/ Shandong Taishan	Total		142	5	27	0	0	0	29	0	1	0	199	5
Career total			324	10	35	0	4	0	34	0	1	0	398	10

== Honours ==
=== Club ===
Shandong Luneng/ Shandong Taishan

- Chinese Super League: 2021
- Chinese FA Cup: 2014, 2020, 2021, 2022.
- Chinese FA Super Cup: 2015
