= 2011 Toulon Tournament squads =

Below are the squads for the 2011 Toulon Tournament. Each team had to submit 20 players.

Players marked in bold have been capped at full International level.

== Group A ==
=== Colombia ===
Head coach: Eduardo Lara Lozano

No.	Pos.	Player	Date of birth (age)	Caps	Goals	Club
1	GK	Cristian Bonilla	2 June 1993 (aged 17)	0	0	(Colombian Football Federation) Boyacá Chicó
2	DF	Luciano Ospina	18 February 1991 (aged 20)	0	0	(Argentine Football Association) Huracán
3	DF	**Pedro Franco**	23 April 1991 (aged 20)	0	0	(Colombian Football Federation) Millonarios
4	DF	**Santiago Arias**	13 January 1992 (aged 19)	0	0	(Colombian Football Federation) La Equidad
5	MF	Héctor Quiñones	13 March 1992 (aged 19)	0	0	(Colombian Football Federation) Deportivo Cali
6	MF	Dídier Moreno	15 September 1991 (aged 19)	0	0	(Colombian Football Federation) Club Santa Fe
7	FW	Andrés Escobar	14 May 1991 (aged 20)	8	1	(Colombian Football Federation) Deportivo Cali
8	MF	**Edwin Cardona**	8 December 1992 (aged 18)	0	0	(Colombian Football Federation) Atlético Nacional
9	FW	**Luis Muriel**	16 April 1991 (aged 20)	0	0	(Italian Football Federation) Udinese
10	FW	**James Rodríguez**	12 June 1991 (aged 19)	0	0	(Portuguese Football Federation) Porto
11	FW	**Duván Zapata**	4 January 1991 (aged 20)	0	0	(Colombian Football Federation) América de Cali
12	GK	Andrés Mosquera	10 September 1992 (aged 18)	0	0	(Colombian Football Federation) Bogotá
13	MF	Juan David Cabezas	27 February 1991 (aged 20)	0	0	(Colombian Football Federation) Deportivo Cali
14	DF	Juan David Díaz	10 October 1992 (aged 18)	0	0	(Colombian Football Federation) Deportivo Pasto
15	MF	**Yerson Candelo**	24 February 1992 (aged 19)	0	0	(Colombian Football Federation) Deportivo Cali
16	DF	**Stefan Medina**	16 June 1991 (aged 19)	0	0	(Colombian Football Federation) Atlético Nacional
17	MF	Jonny Mosquera	17 February 1991 (aged 20)	0	0	(Colombian Football Federation) Envigado
18	DF	**Jeison Murillo**	25 May 1992 (aged 19)	0	0	(Royal Spanish Football Federation) Granada
19	DF	Sebastián Viáfara	2 April 1991 (aged 20)	0	0	(Colombian Football Federation) Deportes Quindío
20	FW	José Adolfo Valencia	18 December 1991 (aged 19)	0	0	(Colombian Football Federation) Club Santa Fe

=== Ivory Coast ===
Head coach: (Denmark) Jacobus Adriaanse

No.	Pos.	Player	Date of birth (age)	Caps	Goals	Club
1	GK	Ullrich N'Drin Edan	19 October 1992 (aged 18)	0	0	(Ivorian Football Federation) AFAD
2	DF	Saoualio Bakayoko	18 May 1991 (aged 20)	0	0	(French Football Federation) Châteauroux
3	FW	Ibrahim Sissoko	29 November 1991 (aged 19)	0	0	(Portuguese Football Federation) Académica de Coimbra
4	DF	Roméo Ouraga	28 October 1991 (aged 19)	0	0	(Royal Belgian Football Association) La Gantoise
5	DF	Samuel Yohou	6 August 1991 (aged 19)	0	0	(French Football Federation) Strasbourg
6	DF	Alassane Kone	25 September 1991 (aged 19)	0	0	(Royal Belgian Football Association) Standard Liège
7	MF	Drissa Traoré	25 March 1992 (aged 19)	0	0	(French Football Federation) Le Havre
8	MF	Ousmana Traoré	8 September 1990 (aged 20)	0	0	(Moldovan Football Federation) Viitorul Constanța
9	FW	Armand Gnanduillet	30 November 1991 (aged 19)	0	0	(French Football Federation) Le Havre
10	MF	Tiama Stevens Taki	20 December 1991 (aged 19)	0	0	(Hellenic Football Federation) Pierikos
11	FW	Christian Katche	12 November 1993 (aged 17)	0	0	(French Football Federation) Olympique Saint-Quentin
12	DF	Ghislain Guessan	15 September 1992 (aged 18)	0	0	(French Football Federation) Nantes
13	DF	Yannick Guede Zadje	9 February 1993 (aged 18)	0	0	(Italian Football Federation) Genoa
14	DF	Zahui-Zipkey Orome	19 January 1992 (aged 19)	0	0	(The Football Association) Croydon Athletic
15	DF	Kévin Boli	21 June 1991 (aged 19)	0	0	(French Football Federation) Sedan
16	GK	Vauvenargues Kehi	7 August 1992 (aged 18)	0	0	(French Football Federation) Strasbourg
17	MF	Ogou Edmond Akichi	24 April 1990 (aged 21)	0	0	(French Football Federation) Auxerre
18	FW	Freddy Drogba	22 February 1992 (aged 19)	0	0	(French Football Federation) Lens
19	MF	Alexandre N'Gadi Kakou	28 November 1990 (aged 20)	0	0	(French Football Federation) Toulouse

=== Italy ===
Head coach: Ciro Ferrara

No.	Pos.	Player	Date of birth (age)	Caps	Goals	Club
1	GK	Sergio Viotti	4 March 1990 (aged 21)	0	0	(Italian Football Federation) Triestina
2	DF	**Davide Santon**	1 February 1991 (aged 20)	0	0	(Italian Football Federation) Inter Milan
3	DF	Alessandro Crescenzi	25 September 1991 (aged 19)	0	0	(Italian Football Federation) Roma
4	MF	Fausto Rossi	2 December 1990 (aged 20)	0	0	(Italian Football Federation) Vicenza
5	DF	Daniele Mori	28 June 1990 (aged 20)	0	0	(Italian Football Federation) Empoli
6	DF	Luca Caldirola	1 February 1991 (aged 20)	0	0	(Italian Football Federation) Inter Milan
7	MF	Marco D'Alessandro	17 February 1991 (aged 20)	0	0	(Italian Football Federation) Roma
8	MF	Luca Marrone	28 March 1990 (aged 21)	0	0	(Italian Football Federation) Juventus
9	FW	Alberto Paloschi	4 January 1990 (aged 21)	0	0	(Italian Football Federation) Genoa
10	FW	**Diego Fabbrini**	31 July 1990 (aged 20)	0	0	(Italian Football Federation) Empoli
11	FW	**Mattia Destro**	20 March 1991 (aged 20)	0	0	(Italian Football Federation) Inter Milan
12	GK	Marco Silvestri	2 March 1991 (aged 20)	0	0	(Italian Football Federation) Chievo
13	DF	Giulio Donati	5 February 1990 (aged 21)	0	0	(Italian Football Federation) Inter Milan
14	DF	Marco Capuano	14 October 1991 (aged 19)	0	0	(Italian Football Federation) Pescara
15	MF	Gianvito Misuraca	2 April 1990 (aged 21)	0	0	(Italian Football Federation) Vicenza
16	FW	**Fabio Borini**	29 March 1991 (aged 20)	0	0	(Italian Football Federation) Parma
17	MF	**Roberto Soriano**	8 February 1991 (aged 20)	0	0	(Italian Football Federation) Sampdoria
18	MF	Riccardo Saponara	21 December 1991 (aged 19)	0	0	(Italian Football Federation) Empoli
19	FW	**Manolo Gabbiadini**	26 November 1991 (aged 19)	0	0	(Italian Football Federation) Cittadella
20	GK	Andrea Caroppo	18 July 1990 (aged 20)	0	0	(Italian Football Federation) Verona

=== Portugal ===
Head coach: Ilídio Vale

No.	Pos.	Player	Date of birth (age)	Caps	Goals	Club
1	GK	**Cláudio Ramos**	16 November 1991 (aged 19)	2	0	(Portuguese Football Federation) Amarante
2	MF	**Pelé**	29 September 1991 (aged 19)	3	1	(Portuguese Football Federation) Belenenses
3	DF	Aníbal Capela	8 May 1991 (aged 20)	1	0	(Portuguese Football Federation) Vizela
4	DF	Nuno Reis	31 January 1991 (aged 20)	3	0	(Royal Belgian Football Association) Cercle Brugge
5	DF	Roderick	30 March 1991 (aged 20)	3	0	(Portuguese Football Federation) Benfica
6	MF	Júlio Alves	26 June 1991 (aged 19)	2	0	(Portuguese Football Federation) Rio Ave
7	FW	**Nélson Oliveira**	8 August 1991 (aged 19)	3	2	(Portuguese Football Federation) Paços de Ferreira
8	DF	**Cédric**	31 August 1991 (aged 19)	2	0	(Portuguese Football Federation) Sporting CP
9	FW	**Amido Baldé**	16 May 1991 (aged 20)	1	0	(Royal Spanish Football Federation) Badajoz
10	MF	**Saná**	29 December 1991 (aged 19)	2	0	(Swiss Football Association) Servette
11	FW	Rui Caetano	20 April 1991 (aged 20)	0	0	(Portuguese Football Federation) Paços de Ferreira
12	GK	Mika	8 March 1991 (aged 20)	1	0	(Portuguese Football Federation) União de Leiria
13	DF	Rodolfo Lourenço	15 July 1991 (aged 19)	0	0	(Portuguese Football Federation) Tourizense
14	FW	Alex	27 August 1991 (aged 19)	3	0	(Portuguese Football Federation) Santa Clara
15	MF	**Danilo Pereira**	9 September 1991 (aged 19)	3	0	(Hellenic Football Federation) Aris
16	DF	**Mário Rui**	27 May 1991 (aged 20)	3	0	(Portuguese Football Federation) Fátima
17	MF	**Sérgio Oliveira**	2 June 1992 (aged 18)	3	1	(Portuguese Football Federation) Beira-Mar
18	FW	Rúben Brígido	23 June 1991 (aged 19)	2	0	(Portuguese Football Federation) União Leiria
19	DF	Paulo Grilo	19 August 1991 (aged 19)	2	0	(Portuguese Football Federation) Académica
20	MF	Thierry Moutinho	28 February 1991 (aged 20)	0	0	(Swiss Football Association) Servette

== Group B ==
=== China ===
Head coach: Su Maozhen

No.	Pos.	Player	Date of birth (age)	Caps	Goals	Club
1	GK	Han Rongze	15 January 1993 (aged 18)	0	0	(Chinese Football Association) Shandong Youth
2	DF	Chu Jinzhao	11 January 1993 (aged 18)	0	0	(Chinese Football Association) Tianjin Teda
3	DF	**Pei Shuai**	14 January 1993 (aged 18)	0	0	(Chinese Football Association) Changchun Yatai
4	DF	Hasan Otkur	10 April 1993 (aged 18)	0	0	(Chinese Football Association) Shandong Youth
5	DF	Li Songyi	27 January 1993 (aged 18)	0	0	(Chinese Football Association) Shandong Youth
6	DF	**Shi Ke**	8 January 1993 (aged 18)	0	0	(Chinese Football Association) Zhejiang Youth
7	MF	**Feng Gang**	6 March 1993 (aged 18)	0	0	(Chinese Football Association) Zhejiang Youth
8	MF	**Liu Binbin**	16 June 1993 (aged 17)	0	0	(French Football Federation) Metz
9	FW	Chen Hao	28 January 1993 (aged 18)	0	0	(Chinese Football Association) Shandong Youth
10	FW	**Wu Xinghan**	24 February 1993 (aged 18)	0	0	(Chinese Football Association) Shandong Youth
11	MF	Guo Yi	29 January 1993 (aged 18)	0	0	(Portuguese Football Federation) Boavista
12	GK	Gao Sheng	8 February 1993 (aged 18)	0	0	(Chinese Football Association) Zhejiang Youth
13	DF	Gong Liangxuan	21 May 1993 (aged 18)	0	0	(Chinese Football Association) Guangzhou Youth
14	MF	Chen Kai	20 January 1993 (aged 18)	0	0	(Chinese Football Association) Chengdu Blades
15	MF	Luo Senwen	6 January 1993 (aged 18)	0	0	(Chinese Football Association) Shandong Youth
16	MF	Zhang Qi	19 March 1993 (aged 18)	0	0	(French Football Federation) Metz
17	MF	Li Fang	27 January 1993 (aged 18)	0	0	(Chinese Football Association) Sichuan F.C.
18	MF	**Xie Pengfei**	29 June 1993 (aged 17)	0	0	(French Football Federation) Metz
19	FW	Teng Shuai	10 February 1993 (aged 18)	0	0	(Chinese Football Association) Jiangsu Youth
20	DF	Wang Meng	16 March 1993 (aged 18)	0	0	(Chinese Football Association) Jiangsu Youth

=== France ===
Head coach: Pierre Mankowski

No.	Pos.	Player	Date of birth (age)	Caps	Goals	Club
1	GK	Franck L'Hostis	4 March 1990 (aged 21)	0	0	(French Football Federation) Monaco
2	DF	Frédéric Duplus	7 April 1990 (aged 21)	0	0	(French Football Federation) Vannes
3	MF	**Florentin Pogba**	19 August 1990 (aged 20)	0	0	(French Football Federation) Sedan
4	DF	**Kalidou Koulibaly**	20 June 1991 (aged 19)	0	0	(French Football Federation) Metz
5	DF	Matthieu Saunier	7 February 1990 (aged 21)	0	0	(French Football Federation) Troyes
6	DF	Loïc Damour	8 January 1991 (aged 20)	0	0	(French Football Federation) Strasbourg
7	FW	Damien Le Tallec	19 April 1990 (aged 21)	0	0	(German Football Association) Borussia Dortmund
8	FW	Steeven Joseph-Monrose	20 July 1990 (aged 20)	0	0	(French Football Federation) Lens
9	FW	Yannis Tafer	11 February 1991 (aged 20)	0	0	(French Football Federation) Toulouse
10	MF	Nicolas Benezet	24 February 1991 (aged 20)	0	0	(French Football Federation) Nîmes
11	MF	Yoann Court	4 March 1990 (aged 21)	0	0	(French Football Federation) Sedan
12	MF	Adrien Trebel	3 March 1991 (aged 20)	0	0	(French Football Federation) Nantes
13	FW	Maxime Bourgeois	3 February 1991 (aged 20)	0	0	(French Football Federation) Auxerre
14	MF	Anthony Knockaert	20 November 1991 (aged 19)	0	0	(French Football Federation) Guingamp
15	DF	Nicolas Isimat-Mirin	15 November 1991 (aged 19)	0	0	(French Football Federation) Valenciennes
16	GK	Mathieu Gorgelin	8 May 1990 (aged 21)	0	0	(French Football Federation) Lyon
17	DF	**Loïc Nego**	15 January 1991 (aged 20)	0	0	(French Football Federation) Nantes
18	MF	Fabien Jarsalé	20 August 1990 (aged 20)	0	0	(French Football Federation) Vannes
19	FW	**Andy Delort**	9 October 1991 (aged 19)	0	0	(French Football Federation) Ajaccio
20	MF	Abdoul Sissoko	20 March 1990 (aged 21)	0	0	(French Football Federation) Troyes

=== Hungary ===
Head coach: Antal Róth

No.	Pos.	Player	Date of birth (age)	Caps	Goals	Club
1	GK	**Péter Gulácsi**	6 May 1990 (aged 21)	0	0	(The Football Association) Liverpool
2	DF	Dávid Kálnoki-Kis	6 August 1991 (aged 19)	0	0	(Hungarian Football Federation) MTK Budapest
3	DF	Dániel Sváb	2 September 1990 (aged 20)	0	0	(Hungarian Football Federation) Ferencváros
4	DF	Zsolt Szokol	16 March 1990 (aged 21)	0	0	(Hungarian Football Federation) Újpest
5	MF	Tamás Egerszegi	30 April 1991 (aged 20)	0	0	(Hungarian Football Federation) Újpest
6	DF	Róbert Litauszki	15 March 1990 (aged 21)	0	0	(Hungarian Football Federation) Újpest
7	FW	Ádám Balajti	30 April 1991 (aged 20)	0	0	(Hungarian Football Federation) Újpest
8	MF	Tamás Tajthy	29 August 1991 (aged 19)	0	0	(Hungarian Football Federation) Újpest
9	FW	**Márkó Futács**	30 April 1991 (aged 20)	0	0	(German Football Association) FC Ingolstadt
10	MF	**Balázs Balogh**	30 April 1991 (aged 20)	0	0	(Hungarian Football Federation) Újpest
11	MF	**Ádám Bódi**	14 October 1990 (aged 20)	0	0	(Hungarian Football Federation) Debrecen
12	GK	**Balázs Megyeri**	31 March 1990 (aged 21)	0	0	(Hellenic Football Federation) Olympiacos
13	MF	**Krisztián Simon**	10 June 1991 (aged 19)	0	0	(Royal Dutch Football Association) Feyenoord
14	DF	**Tamás Kádár**	14 March 1990 (aged 21)	0	0	(The Football Association) Newcastle United
15	MF	Máté Kiss	30 April 1991 (aged 20)	0	0	(Hungarian Football Federation) Győri ETO
16	MF	**Ádám Simon**	30 March 1990 (aged 21)	0	0	(Hungarian Football Federation) Szombathelyi Haladás
17	MF	András Gosztonyi	30 April 1991 (aged 20)	0	0	(Hungarian Football Federation) Videoton
18	DF	**Attila Fiola**	17 February 1990 (aged 21)	0	0	(Hungarian Football Federation) Paksi
19	FW	**Márton Eppel**	10 November 1991 (aged 19)	0	0	(Hungarian Football Federation) MTK Budapest
20	DF	Máté Katona	16 February 1990 (aged 21)	0	0	(Hungarian Football Federation) Vasas

=== Mexico ===
Head coach: Juan Carlos Chávez

No.	Pos.	Player	Date of birth (age)	Caps	Goals	Club
1	GK	Antonio Rodríguez	4 July 1992 (aged 18)			(Mexican Football Federation) Guadalajara
2	DF	Kristian Álvarez	20 April 1992 (aged 19)			(Mexican Football Federation) Guadalajara
3	DF	Alexis Loera	9 February 1991 (aged 20)			(Mexican Football Federation) Atlas
4	DF	**Néstor Araujo**	29 August 1991 (aged 19)			(Mexican Football Federation) Cruz Azul
5	MF	Diego de Buen	3 July 1991 (aged 19)			(Mexican Football Federation) UNAM
6	MF	Marvin Piñón	12 June 1991 (aged 19)			(Mexican Football Federation) Monterrey
7	MF	Saúl Villalobos	26 June 1991 (aged 19)			(Mexican Football Federation) Atlas
8	MF	Carlos Orrantía	1 February 1991 (aged 20)			(Mexican Football Federation) UNAM
9	FW	Taufic Guarch	4 October 1991 (aged 19)			(Mexican Football Federation) Estudiantes Tecos
10	FW	**Érick Torres**	19 January 1993 (aged 18)			(Mexican Football Federation) Guadalajara
11	MF	Ulises Dávila	13 April 1991 (aged 20)			(Mexican Football Federation) Guadalajara
12	GK	Carlos López	21 March 1991 (aged 20)			(Argentine Football Association) Talleres de Córdoba
13	FW	Lugiani Gallardo	20 April 1991 (aged 20)			(Mexican Football Federation) América
14	MF	**Jorge Enríquez**	8 January 1991 (aged 20)			(Mexican Football Federation) Guadalajara
15	DF	César Ibáñez	1 April 1992 (aged 19)			(Mexican Football Federation) Atlas
16	DF	Jorge Valencia	6 April 1991 (aged 20)			(Mexican Football Federation) Tigres UANL
17	FW	**Alan Pulido**	8 March 1991 (aged 20)			(Mexican Football Federation) Tigres UANL
18	DF	**Diego Reyes**	19 September 1992 (aged 18)			(Mexican Football Federation) América
19	FW	Édson Rivera	4 November 1991 (aged 19)			(Mexican Football Federation) Atlas
20	FW	David Izazola	23 October 1991 (aged 19)			(Mexican Football Federation) UNAM
