= 2020 Chinese FA Cup =

CFA Cup

Tournament details
- Country: China
- Dates: 18 September – 19 December
- Teams: 24

Final positions
- Champions: Shandong Luneng Taishan (6th title)
- Runners-up: Jiangsu Suning
- AFC Champions League: Shandong Luneng Taishan

Tournament statistics
- Matches played: 25
- Goals scored: 76 (3.04 per match)

The 2020 Chinese Football Association Cup, officially known as the Yanjing Beer 2020 Chinese FA Cup (Chinese: 燕京啤酒2020中国足球协会杯) for sponsorship reasons, was the 22nd edition of the Chinese FA Cup. It was postponed following the COVID-19 pandemic in mainland China. On 2 September 2020, Chinese Football Association announced that Chinese FA Cup would resume on 18 September 2020.

The defending champions, Chinese Super League side Shanghai Greenland Shenhua, were eliminated by Guangzhou R&F in the first round on 18 September.

== Schedule ==
The schedule is as follows.

Round	Draw date	Match dates	Clubs remaining	Clubs involved	Winners from previous round	New entries this round	New Entries Notes
First round	2 September	18–19 September	24	16	–	16	16 2020 Chinese Super League teams
Second round	30 October	26–29 November	16	16	8	8	2020 China League One top 8 teams
Quarter-finals	30 October	1–2 December	8	8	8	none	
Semi-finals	30 October	First Leg 5–6 December; Second Leg 12–13 December	4	4	4	none	
Final	30 October	19 December	2	2	2	none	

== First round ==
The draw for the first round took place on 2 September 2020.

18 September 2020	Jiangsu Suning (1)	2–0	Shenzhen (1)	Jinzhou Stadium, Dalian
15:30 UTC+8	Santini 31'; Li Ang 73'			Attendance: 0 Referee: Wang Di

18 September 2020	Shanghai Greenland Shenhua (1)	1–1 (3–5 p)	Guangzhou R&F (1)	Dalian Sports Center, Dalian
18:00 UTC+8	Yang Xu 47' (pen.)		Zhang Gong 81'	Attendance: 0 Referee: Niu Minghui
	Penalties
	N'Doumbou (penalty missed); Peng Xinli (penalty scored); Zhu Chenjie (penalty scored); Jiang Shenglong (penalty scored)		(penalty scored) Saba; (penalty scored) Lu Lin; (penalty scored) Huang Zhengyu; (penalty scored) Zhang Gong; (penalty scored) Tang Miao

18 September 2020	Guangzhou Evergrande Taobao (1)	2–0	Henan Jianye (1)	Dalian Youth Football Training Base Main Stadium, Dalian
19:35 UTC+8	Tan Kaiyuan 32'; Aloísio 64'			Attendance: 0 Referee: Tang Shunqi

18 September 2020	Shandong Luneng Taishan (1)	4–0	Dalian Pro (1)	Jinzhou Stadium, Dalian
20:00 UTC+8	Chen Kerui 8'; Róger Guedes 56'; Guo Tianyu 61'; Liu Yang 75'			Attendance: 0 Referee: Ma Li

19 September 2020	Tianjin TEDA (1)	2–0	Shijiazhuang Ever Bright (1)	Kunshan Sports Centre Stadium, Kunshan
15:30 UTC+8	Xiao Zhi 27' (pen.); Piao Taoyu 64'			Attendance: 0 Referee: Shen Yinhao

19 September 2020	Wuhan Zall (1)	1–1 (4–3 p)	Hebei China Fortune (1)	Suzhou Olympic Sports Centre, Suzhou
18:00 UTC+8	Zhao Yuhao 72' (o.g.)		Turay 44'	Attendance: 0 Referee: Xia Jun
	Penalties
	Yao Hanlin (penalty scored); Hu Jinghang (penalty scored); Cong Zhen (penalty scored); Chen Ao (penalty missed); Zhou Tong (penalty scored)		(penalty missed) Paulinho; (penalty scored) Gao Huaze; (penalty scored) Feng Gang; (penalty scored) Liao Wei; (penalty missed) Luo Senwen

19 September 2020	Beijing Sinobo Guoan (1)	2–1	Qingdao Huanghai (1)	Suzhou Sports Center, Suzhou
19:35 UTC+8	Alan 45+2' (pen.), 69'		Cléo 31' (pen.)	Attendance: 0 Referee: Ma Ning

19 September 2020	Shanghai SIPG (1)	3–2	Chongqing Dangdai Lifan (1)	Kunshan Sports Centre Stadium, Kunshan
20:00 UTC+8	Oscar 34'; Yu Hai 45+1'; Li Shenglong 74'		Marcinho 52'; Dong Honglin 54'	Attendance: 0 Referee: Huang Yi

== Second round ==
The draw for the second round took place on 30 October 2020. The eight CSL clubs which advanced to this round face the top eight clubs of the 2020 China League One.

26 November 2020	Shanghai SIPG (1)	0–4	Changchun Yatai (2)	Suzhou Olympic Sports Centre, Suzhou
15:35 UTC+8			Yang Chaosheng 30'; Tan Long 40'; Serginho 56'; Memet-Raim Memet-Ali 75'	Referee: Huang Yi

26 November 2020	Kunshan (2)	3–0	Guangzhou Evergrande Taobao (1)	Kunshan Sports Centre Stadium, Kunshan
19:35 UTC+8	Adeniji 7'; Tu Dongxu 20'; Pereira 60'			Referee: Wan Tao

27 November 2020	Tianjin TEDA (1)	1–0	Guizhou Hengfeng (2)	Kunshan Sports Centre Stadium, Kunshan
15:35 UTC+8	Zheng Kaimu 79'			Referee: Jia Zhiliang

27 November 2020	Jiangsu Suning (1)	7–2	Meizhou Hakka (2)	Suzhou Olympic Sports Centre, Suzhou
19:35 UTC+8	Zhang Cheng 20', 58'; Xie Pengfei 32', 41'; Feng Boyuan 63'; Li Ang 77'; Zhang Lingfeng 89'		Shi Liang 54'; Guo Yi 85'	Referee: Dai Yige

28 November 2020	Wuhan Zall (1)	2–0	Taizhou Yuanda (2)	Changzhou Olympic Sports Centre, Changzhou
14:30 UTC+8	Yao Hanlin 25'; Wang Dalong 90+1' (o.g.)			Referee: Zhang Lei

28 November 2020	Beijing Sinobo Guoan (1)	1–0	Chengdu Better City (2)	Changzhou Olympic Sports Centre, Changzhou
19:35 UTC+8	Xie Longfei 8'			Referee: Ma Ning

29 November 2020	Guangzhou R&F (1)	6–1	Suzhou Dongwu (2)	Jiangyin Stadium, Changzhou
15:35 UTC+8	Renatinho 25', 43'; Zivkovic 31', 54'; Song Wenjie 50', 68'		Tang Chuang 90+1'	Referee: He Kai

29 November 2020	Shandong Luneng Taishan (1)	2–0	Zhejiang Energy Greentown (2)	Changzhou Olympic Sports Centre, Changzhou
19:35 UTC+8	Fellaini 53'; Duan Liuyu 70'			Referee: Wang Jing

== Quarter-finals ==
The draw for the quarter-finals took place on 30 October 2020.

1 December 2020	Tianjin TEDA (1)	5–1	Changchun Yatai (2)	Suzhou Olympic Sports Centre, Suzhou
15:00 UTC+8	Soares 16', 40'; Qiu Tianyi 28'; Lima 66', 73'		Yang Chaosheng 77'	Referee: Wang Jing

1 December 2020	Kunshan (2)	0–2	Jiangsu Suning (1)	Kunshan Sports Centre Stadium, Kunshan
20:00 UTC+8			Wu Xi 40'; Zhang Lingfeng 87'	Referee: Jia Zhiliang

2 December 2020	Beijing Sinobo Guoan (1)	0–3	Wuhan Zall (1)	Kunshan Sports Centre Stadium, Kunshan
15:00 UTC+8			Hu Jinghang 4'; Dong Xuesheng 12'; Jiang Zilei 38'	Referee: Dai Yige

2 December 2020	Guangzhou R&F (1)	2–2 (4–5 p)	Shandong Luneng Taishan (1)	Suzhou Sports Center, Suzhou
20:00 UTC+8	Zivkovic 90+1'; Renatinho 90+2'		Róger Guedes 28', 32'	Referee: Shi Zhenlu
	Penalties
	Ye Chugui (penalty scored); Li Tixiang (penalty scored); Huang Zhengyu (penalty scored); Zivkovic (penalty scored); Tang Miao (penalty missed)		(penalty scored) Fellaini; (penalty scored) Moisés; (penalty scored) Zheng Zheng; (penalty scored) Chen Kerui; (penalty scored) Liu Yang

== Semi-finals ==
The draw for the semi-finals took place on 30 October 2020.

=== 1st leg ===
5 December 2020	Jiangsu Suning (1)	1–1	Tianjin TEDA (1)	Suzhou Olympic Sports Centre, Suzhou
19:35 UTC+8	Liu Yang 73' (o.g.)		Acheampong 49'	Referee: Wan Tao

6 December 2020	Wuhan Zall (1)	0–5	Shandong Luneng Taishan (1)	Suzhou Sports Center, Suzhou
20:00 UTC+8			Moisés 5'; Róger Guedes 14', 27', 67' (pen.); Fellaini 71'	Referee: Li Haixin

=== 2nd leg ===
12 December 2020	Tianjin TEDA (1)	0–0 (2–4 p)	Jiangsu Suning (1)	Suzhou Sports Center, Suzhou
15:00 UTC+8				Referee: Xing Qi
	Penalties
	Soares (penalty scored); Su Yuanjie (penalty missed); Song Yue (penalty scored); Liu Yang (penalty missed)		(penalty scored) Ji Xiang; (penalty missed) Tian Yinong; (penalty scored) Xie Pengfei; (penalty scored) Feng Boyuan; (penalty scored) Li Ang

1–1 on aggregate. Jiangsu Suning won 4–2 on penalties.

13 December 2020	Shandong Luneng Taishan (1)	1–0	Wuhan Zall (1)	Suzhou Olympic Sports Centre, Suzhou
15:00 UTC+8	Fellaini 72'			Referee: Zhang Lei

Shandong Luneng Taishan won 6–0 on aggregate.

== Final ==
The draw for the final took place on 30 October 2020.

19 December 2020
15:00 UTC+8

Jiangsu Suning (1)	0–2	Shandong Luneng Taishan (1)
	Match report	Wang Tong 49'; Graziano Pellè 77'

Suzhou Olympic Sports Centre, Suzhou
Referee: Shi Zhenlu

GK	1	(China) Gu Chao
RB	20	(China) Abduhamit Abdugheni
CB	30	(China) Ye Chongqiu		(substituted off) 60'
CB	27	(China) Yang Boyu
LB	2	(China) Li Ang
RM	24	(China) Ji Xiang (c)
CM	3	(China) Tian Yinong
CM	12	(China) Zhang Xiaobin		(substituted off) 90+2'
LM	11	(China) Xie Pengfei		(substituted off) 60'
CF	32	(China) Huang Zichang
CF	7	(China) Luo Jing	(yellow card) 71'
Substitutes:
GK	19	(China) Zhang Yan
GK	35	(China) Huang Zihao
GK	42	(China) Qi Yuxi
DF	37	(China) Zhu Jiahao
MF	16	(China) Gao Tianyi
MF	18	(China) Zhang Lingfeng		(substituted on) 60'
MF	22	(China) Wu Xi
MF	31	(China) Xie Xiaofan
MF	38	(China) Xie Zhiwei		(substituted on) 90+2'
MF	41	(China) Li Jiawei
FW	8	(China) Feng Boyuan		(substituted on) 60'
Manager:
(Romania) Cosmin Olăroiu

GK	18	(China) Han Rongze
RB	6	(China) Wang Tong	(substituted off) 79'
CB	35	(China) Dai Lin	(substituted off) 79'
CB	5	(China) Zheng Zheng
LB	39	(China) Song Long
CM	22	(China) Hao Junmin (c)	(substituted off) 46'
CM	25	(Belgium) Marouane Fellaini
RM	36	(China) Duan Liuyu
AM	10	(Brazil) Moisés
LM	23	(Brazil) Róger Guedes
CF	9	(Italy) Graziano Pellè
Substitutes:
GK	1	(China) Li Guanxi
GK	14	(China) Wang Dalei
DF	3	(China) Liu Junshuai
DF	4	(Hungary) Tamás Kádár
DF	11	(China) Liu Yang	(substituted on) 79'
DF	15	(China) Qi Tianyu
MF	17	(China) Wu Xinghan	(substituted on) 46'
MF	21	(China) Liu Binbin
MF	28	(China) Chen Kerui	(substituted on) 79'
MF	34	(China) Huang Cong
FW	7	(China) Guo Tianyu
FW	32	(China) Tian Xin
Manager:
(China) Hao Wei

Assistant referees:
Song Xiangyun
Wang Dexin
Fourth official:
Wang Jing
Video assistant referee:
Zhang Lei
Assistant video assistant referees:
Yang Delin
