= Qi Tianyu =

Chinese footballer

Qi Tianyu 齐天羽
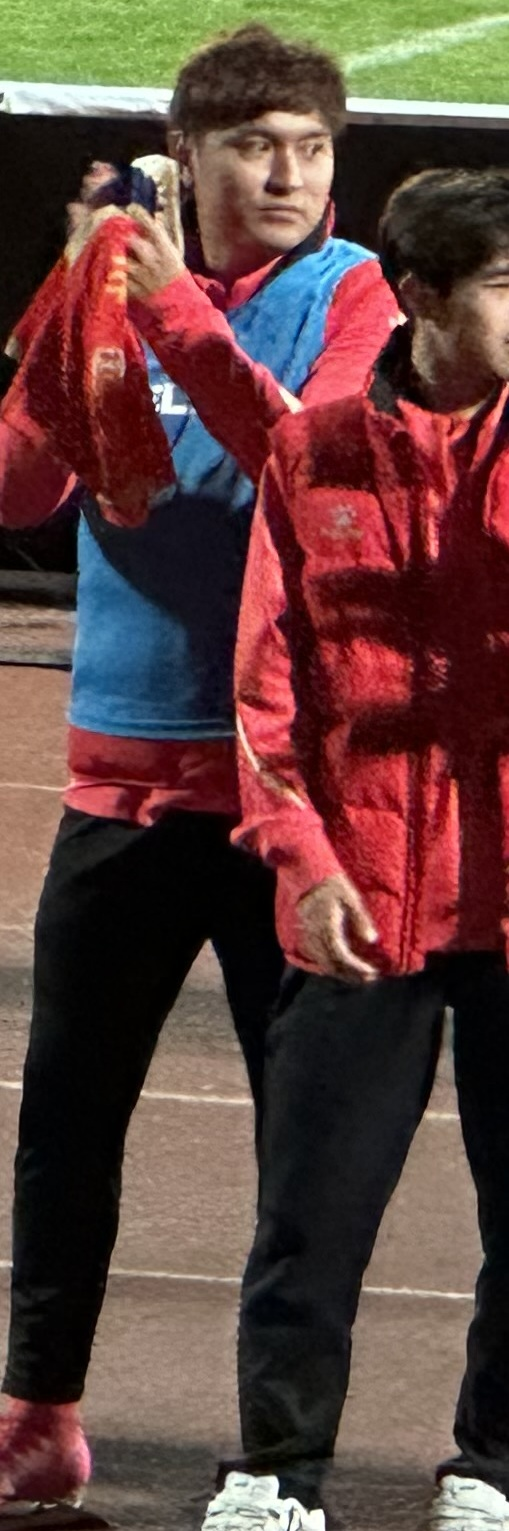
- Qi Tianyu in May 2025

Personal information
- Full name: Qi Tianyu
- Date of birth: 22 January 1993 (age 33)
- Place of birth: Jinan, Shandong, China
- Height: 1.82 m (5 ft 11 1/2 in)
- Position: Midfielder

Youth career
- Shandong Luneng

Senior career*
Years	Team	Apps	(Gls)
2011	Shandong Youth	16	(2)
2012–2025	Shandong Taishan	46	(2)
2023	→ Jinan Xingzhou (loan)	11	(0)
2024	→ Tai'an Tiankuang (loan)	21	(2)
2025	→ Shanghai Jiading Huilong (loan)	7	(0)

International career
2013	China U22		
- * Club domestic league appearances and goals as of 11 June 2024

Qi Tianyu (Chinese: 齐天羽; pinyin: Qí Tiānyǔ; born 22 January 1993) is a Chinese footballer who currently plays as a midfielder.

== Club career ==
After playing in the youth squad of Shandong Luneng Taishan, Qi started his professional football career in 2011. He played for Shandong Youth in the China League Two and scored 2 goals in 16 appearances in the season. Qi was promoted to Shandong Luneng's first team squad by Henk ten Cate in 2012. In August 2013, he was loaned to Campeonato de Portugal side Casa Pia for one season. However, he didn't register to play for Casa Pia due to injury. On 22 April 2015, he made his debut for the club in the 2015 AFC Champions League against Becamex Bình Dương with a 3–1 victory, coming on as a substitution for Liu Binbin in the 84th minute. He made his Super League debut in the first match after Felix Magath took charge of the team on 19 June 2016, in a 0–0 draw against Shanghai SIPG. He became a regular starter and made 11 league appearances in the 2016 season.

In January 2019, Qi extended his contract with the club until the end of the 2021 season. He would go on to establish himself as a squad regular within the team that won the 2020 Chinese FA Cup against Jiangsu Suning in a 2-0 victory. A consistent versatile regular within the team, he would gain his first league title with the club when he was part of the team that won the 2021 Chinese Super League title. This would be followed up by him winning the 2022 Chinese FA Cup with them the next season.

== Career statistics ==
Statistics accurate as of match played 11 June 2024.

Appearances and goals by club, season and competition
Club	Season	League			National Cup		Continental		Other		Total	
Club	Season	Division	Apps	Goals	Apps	Goals	Apps	Goals	Apps	Goals	Apps	Goals
Shandong Youth	2011	China League Two	16	2	-		-		-		16	2
Shandong Luneng/ Shandong Taishan	2012	Chinese Super League	0	0	0	0	-		-		0	0
Shandong Luneng/ Shandong Taishan	2013	Chinese Super League	0	0	0	0	-		-		0	0
Shandong Luneng/ Shandong Taishan	2014	Chinese Super League	0	0	0	0	0	0	-		0	0
Shandong Luneng/ Shandong Taishan	2015	Chinese Super League	0	0	1	0	1	0	0 (Note: Appearances in Chinese FA Super Cup)	0	2	0
Shandong Luneng/ Shandong Taishan	2016	Chinese Super League	11	0	1	0	3	0	-		14	0
Shandong Luneng/ Shandong Taishan	2017	Chinese Super League	6	0	0	0	-		-		6	0
Shandong Luneng/ Shandong Taishan	2018	Chinese Super League	1	0	1	1	-		-		2	1
Shandong Luneng/ Shandong Taishan	2019	Chinese Super League	4	0	2	0	1	0	-		7	0
Shandong Luneng/ Shandong Taishan	2020	Chinese Super League	3	0	3	0	-		-		6	0
Shandong Luneng/ Shandong Taishan	2021	Chinese Super League	12	1	3	0	-		-		15	1
Shandong Luneng/ Shandong Taishan	2022	Chinese Super League	9	1	3	0	0	0	-		12	1
Shandong Luneng/ Shandong Taishan	2023	Chinese Super League	0	0	0	0	0	0	0	0	0	0
Shandong Luneng/ Shandong Taishan	2024	Chinese Super League	0	0	0	0	0	0	-		0	0
Shandong Luneng/ Shandong Taishan	Total		46	2	14	1	5	0	0	0	65	3
Jinan Xingzhou (loan)	2023	China League One	11	0	0	0	-		-		11	0
Tai'an Tiankuang (loan)	2024	China League Two	11	0	2	0	-		-		13	0
Total			84	4	16	1	5	0	0	0	105	5

== Honours ==
=== Club ===
Shandong Luneng/ Shandong Taishan

- Chinese Super League: 2021
- Chinese FA Cup: 2014, 2020, 2021, 2022.
- Chinese FA Super Cup: 2015
