= Guo Tianyu =

Chinese footballer

Guo Tianyu 郭田雨
Personal information
- Full name: Guo Tianyu
- Date of birth: 5 March 1999 (age 27)
- Place of birth: Jinan, Shandong, China
- Height: 1.92 m (6 ft 3 1/2 in)
- Position: Forward

Youth career
- 2011–2015: Shandong Taishan
- 2014–2015: → Oriental Dragon (loan)

Senior career*
Years	Team	Apps	(Gls)
2016–2023	Shandong Taishan	56	(17)
2019	→ Wuhan Zall (loan)	15	(0)
2022	→ Vizela (loan)	3	(0)
2024–2025	Chiangrai United	15	(0)

International career^{‡}
2013–2014	China U17	12	(0)
2016–2018	China U20	29	(6)
- * Club domestic league appearances and goals as of 4 November 2024 ‡ National team caps and goals as of 26 October 2018

Guo Tianyu (Chinese: 郭田雨; pinyin: Guō Tiányǔ; born 5 March 1999) is a Chinese professional footballer who plays as a forward.

In September 2024, he was given a lifetime ban from football-related activities in China over allegations of match-fixing and other forms of corruption.

== Club career ==
=== Shandong Taishan ===
Guo joined Chinese Super League side Shandong Luneng Taishan's (now renamed Shandong Taishan) youth academy in May 2011. He was promoted to the first team squad by head coach Mano Menezes in 2016. He made his senior debut in the fourth round of the 2016 Chinese FA Cup on 29 June 2016 with a 1–0 away defeat against Shanghai Shenhua, coming on as a substitution for Wu Xinghan in the 83rd minute. On 4 March 2017, he made his league debut in a 2–0 home win against Tianjin Teda, coming on for Wang Tong in the stoppage time.

Guo would return to Shandong Taishan after his loan spell at Wuhan Zall and go on to score his first goal for the club in a league game on 9 August 2020 against Guangzhou Evergrande where he scored the winning goal in a 1–0 victory. Guo would go on to establish himself as a regular within the team and was part of the squad that won the 2020 Chinese FA Cup against Jiangsu Suning in a 2–0 victory. He scored 10 goals in the 2021 Chinese Super League season, became an integral part of the Taishan team that won the Chinese Super League and Chinese FA Cup domestic double, their first league title in 11 years.

==== Wuhan Zall (loan) ====
In February 2019, Guo was loaned to newly promoted Wuhan Zall for the 2019 season. He would make his debut for them in a league game against Beijing Guoan on 1 March 2019 that ended in a 1–0 defeat.

==== Vizela (loan) ====
On 27 January 2022, Guo was loaned to Primeira Liga club Vizela until 30 June 2022. He made 3 league appearances during his time in Portugal, before returning to Taishan's first team squad in August 2022. On his return, he would establish himself as a regular member of the team once more and added the 2022 Chinese FA Cup towards his trophy collection with them.

=== Chiangrai United ===
On 8 August 2024, Guo joined Thai League 1 club Chiangrai United. He made his debut for the club on 25 August in a 5–0 loss to Buriram United.

On 10 September 2024, Chinese Football Association announced that Guo was banned from football-related activities in China for life for involving in match-fixing.

== Career statistics ==
Statistics accurate as of match played 31 January 2023.

Appearances and goals by club, season and competition
Club	Season	League			National Cup		Continental		Other		Total	
Club	Season	Division	Apps	Goals	Apps	Goals	Apps	Goals	Apps	Goals	Apps	Goals
Shandong Luneng/ Shandong Taishan	2016	Chinese Super League	0	0	1	0	-		-		1	0
Shandong Luneng/ Shandong Taishan	2017	Chinese Super League	2	0	0	0	-		-		2	0
Shandong Luneng/ Shandong Taishan	2018	Chinese Super League	0	0	0	0	-		-		0	0
Shandong Luneng/ Shandong Taishan	2020	Chinese Super League	16	4	5	1	-		-		21	5
Shandong Luneng/ Shandong Taishan	2021	Chinese Super League	22	10	1	0	-		-		23	10
Shandong Luneng/ Shandong Taishan	2022	Chinese Super League	16	3	2	0	0	0	-		18	3
Shandong Luneng/ Shandong Taishan	Total		56	17	9	1	0	0	0	0	65	18
Wuhan Zall (loan)	2019	Chinese Super League	15	0	1	0	-		-		16	0
Vizela (loan)	2021–22	Primeira Liga	3	0	0	0	-		-		3	0
Career total			74	17	9	1	0	0	0	0	83	18

== Honours ==
=== Club ===
Shandong Luneng/ Shandong Taishan

- Chinese Super League: 2021.
- Chinese FA Cup: 2020, 2021, 2022.

=== Individual ===
- Chinese Super League Domestic Golden Boot winner: 2021
