= Chen Kerui =

Chinese association football player

Personal information
- Date of birth: 9 March 1996 (age 30)
- Place of birth: Chongqing, Sichuan, China
- Height: 1.83 m (6 ft 0 in)
- Position: Midfielder

Team information
- Current team: Lanzhou Longyuan Athletic
- Number: 39

Youth career
- –2013: Shandong FA
- 2013–2014: Shandong Luneng Taishan
- 2014–2015: Belenenses

Senior career*
Years	Team	Apps	(Gls)
2012	Shandong Youth	0	(0)
2015–2016	→ Pinhalnovense (loan)	19	(0)
2016–2022	Shandong Taishan	13	(0)
2017	→ Baoding Yingli ETS (loan)	12	(0)
2018	→ Meizhou Hakka (loan)	28	(2)
2021	→ Tianjin Jinmen Tiger (loan)	16	(0)
2023–2024	Chongqing Tonglianglong	12	(0)
2024–	Lanzhou Longyuan Athletic	56	(1)

International career^{‡}
2012	China U-16	1	(0)
2014	China U-19	2	(0)
- * Club domestic league appearances and goals as of 13:14, 29 July 2026 (UTC) ‡ National team caps and goals as of 13:14, 8 December 2019 (UTC)

Chen Kerui (Chinese: 陈科睿; pinyin: Chén Kēruì; born 9 March 1996) is a Chinese footballer who currently plays as a midfielder for Lanzhou Longyuan Athletic.

== Club career ==
Chen Kerui would play for the Shandong Luneng Taishan (now known as Shandong Taishan) youth team and even be included to the reserve squad called Shandong Youth, who were allowed to take part in the Chinese football pyramid. He would go abroad to Portugal where he made his senior debut for Pinhalnovense on 23 August 2015 in a league game against Lusitano VRSA in a 2-0 defeat. He would return to Shandong where he was soon loaned out to second-tier football club Baoding Yingli ETS in the 2017 China League One season. He would make his debut for them in a league game on 8 July 2017 against Shijiazhuang Ever Bright in a game that ended in a 2-1 defeat. After his loan ended with Baoding he was loaned out once again to Meizhou Hakka for the 2018 China League One season where he made his first appearance for the club in a league game on 10 March 2018 against Shijiazhuang Ever Bright in a 2-1 defeat. This was followed by his first goal on 8 April 2018 in a league game against Nei Mongol Zhongyou in a 3-1 victory.

Chen would return to Shandong for the 2019 Chinese Super League season where he made his debut for the club on 31 March 2019 in a league game against Tianjin Tianhai in a 4-2 victory. On 18 September 2020 he would score his first goal for the club in a Chinese FA Cup game against Dalian Pro that ended in a 4-0 victory. To gain more playing time he would be loaned out to top tier Chinese club Tianjin Jinmen Tiger, where he would make his debut in a league game against Shanghai Port on 22 April 2021 in a 6-1 defeat.

In June 2024, Chen transferred to China League Two club Rizhao Yuqi, the club relocated to Lanzhou and renamed as Lanzhou Longyuan Athletic in 2025.

== Career statistics ==
As of 29 July 2026.

Club	Season	League			Cup		Continental		Other		Total	
Club	Season	Division	Apps	Goals	Apps	Goals	Apps	Goals	Apps	Goals	Apps	Goals
Shandong Youth	2012	China League Two	0	0	-		-		-		0	0
Pinhalnovense (loan)	2015–16	Campeonato de Portugal	19	0	2	0	–		–		21	0
Shandong Luneng Taishan/ Shandong Taishan	2016	Chinese Super League	0	0	0	0	0	0	–		0	0
Shandong Luneng Taishan/ Shandong Taishan	2019	Chinese Super League	10	0	1	0	0	0	–		11	0
Shandong Luneng Taishan/ Shandong Taishan	2020	Chinese Super League	3	0	4	1	–		–		7	1
Shandong Luneng Taishan/ Shandong Taishan	2022	Chinese Super League	0	0	0	0	0	0	–		0	0
Shandong Luneng Taishan/ Shandong Taishan	Total		13	0	5	1	0	0	0	0	18	1
Baoding Yingli ETS (loan)	2017	China League One	12	0	0	0	–		–		12	0
Meizhou Hakka (loan)	2018	China League One	28	2	1	0	–		–		29	2
Tianjin Jinmen Tiger (loan)	2021	Chinese Super League	16	0	1	0	–		–		17	0
Chongqing Tonglianglong	2023	China League Two	11	0	5	0	–		–		16	0
Chongqing Tonglianglong	2024	China League One	1	0	1	0	–		–		2	0
Chongqing Tonglianglong	Total		12	0	6	0	0	0	0	0	18	0
Rizhao Yuqi/ Lanzhou Longyuan Athletic	2024	China League Two	15	0	1	0	–		–		16	0
Rizhao Yuqi/ Lanzhou Longyuan Athletic	2025	China League Two	25	0	2	0	–		–		27	0
Rizhao Yuqi/ Lanzhou Longyuan Athletic	2026	China League Two	16	1	2	0	–		–		18	1
Rizhao Yuqi/ Lanzhou Longyuan Athletic	Total		56	1	5	0	0	0	0	0	61	1
Career total			156	3	20	1	0	0	0	0	176	4

== Honours ==
=== Club ===
Shandong Luneng Taishan/ Shandong Taishan

- Chinese FA Cup: 2020
