= Wu Xinghan =

Chinese footballer

Wu Xinghan 吴兴涵
Personal information
- Full name: Wu Xinghan
- Date of birth: 24 February 1993 (age 33)
- Place of birth: Tianjin, China
- Height: 1.83 m (6 ft 0 in)
- Position: Left winger

Team information
- Current team: Tianjin Jinmen Tiger (on loan from Shandong Taishan)
- Number: 17

Youth career
- 2005–2011: Shandong Luneng

Senior career*
Years	Team	Apps	(Gls)
2011	Shandong Youth	13	(8)
2012–	Shandong Taishan	208	(21)
2023	→ Nanjing City (loan)	12	(1)
2026–	→ Tianjin Jinmen Tiger (loan)	20	(1)

International career^{‡}
2011–2013	China U-19	10	(3)
2013–2016	China U-23	24	(6)
2021–	China	6	(1)
- * Club domestic league appearances and goals as of 22 November 2026 ‡ National team caps and goals as of 15 November 2021

Wu Xinghan (simplified Chinese: 吴兴涵; traditional Chinese: 吳興涵; pinyin: Wú Xìnghán; born Liu Peng on 24 February 1991) is a Chinese footballer who currently plays for Tianjin Jinmen Tiger, on loan from Shandong Taishan as a right-footed left winger in the Chinese Super League.

== Club career ==
Wu Xinghan started his football career when he joined Shandong Luneng's youth academy in 2005. He played for third-tier side Shandong Youth in 2011, scoring eight goals in 13 appearances that season. With his first goal for the club scored on 21 May 2011 in a 2-0 win against Hebei Zhongji. Wu was promoted to Shandong Luneng's first team (now renamed Shandong Taishan) by then manager Henk ten Cate in the 2012 season. He made his debut for the club on 24 March 2012 in a 3-3 draw against Dalian Aerbin, coming on as a substitute for Liu Binbin.

Wu would cement his place as a regular in the team's midfield during the 2012 season and even after the departure of Henk ten Cate, he continued to be a regular squad player that would aid the club by winning the 2014 Chinese FA Cup with them. A consistent regular within the team, he would gain his second Chinese FA Cup by winning the 2020 Chinese FA Cup against Jiangsu Suning in a 2-0 victory. This would be followed by his first league title with the club when he was part of the team that won the 2021 Chinese Super League title. Another Chinese FA Cup would be followed up by him winning the 2022 Chinese FA Cup with them.

On 27 February 2026, Wu was loaned to Tianjin Jinmen Tiger for the 2026 season.

== International career ==
Wu was first called up to the Chinese under-20 national team by Su Maozhen in December 2010. He scored four goals in three appearances during 2012 AFC U-19 Championship qualification as the team qualified for the 2012 AFC U-19 Championship.

He made his debut for China national football team on 30 May 2021 in a World Cup qualifier against Guam.

== Career statistics ==
=== Club ===
As of match played 31 December 2024.

Appearances and goals by club, season and competition
Club	Season	League			National Cup		Continental		Other		Total	
Club	Season	Division	Apps	Goals	Apps	Goals	Apps	Goals	Apps	Goals	Apps	Goals
Shandong Youth	2011	China League Two	13	8	-		-		-		13	8
Shandong Luneng/ Shandong Taishan	2012	Chinese Super League	21	1	3	0	-		-		23	1
Shandong Luneng/ Shandong Taishan	2013	Chinese Super League	3	2	0	0	-		-		3	2
Shandong Luneng/ Shandong Taishan	2014	Chinese Super League	10	0	3	0	4	0	-		17	0
Shandong Luneng/ Shandong Taishan	2015	Chinese Super League	11	0	5	0	3	0	0 (Note: Appearances in Chinese FA Super Cup)	0	19	0
Shandong Luneng/ Shandong Taishan	2016	Chinese Super League	22	2	2	0	7	0	-		31	2
Shandong Luneng/ Shandong Taishan	2017	Chinese Super League	28	3	4	0	-		-		32	3
Shandong Luneng/ Shandong Taishan	2018	Chinese Super League	26	4	7	0	-		-		33	4
Shandong Luneng/ Shandong Taishan	2019	Chinese Super League	17	1	3	0	7	0	-		27	1
Shandong Luneng/ Shandong Taishan	2020	Chinese Super League	17	1	6	0	-		-		23	1
Shandong Luneng/ Shandong Taishan	2021	Chinese Super League	14	3	0	0	-		-		14	3
Shandong Luneng/ Shandong Taishan	2022	Chinese Super League	11	4	4	0	0	0	-		15	4
Shandong Luneng/ Shandong Taishan	2024	Chinese Super League	18	0	3	0	5	0	-		26	0
Shandong Luneng/ Shandong Taishan	Total		198	21	40	0	26	0	0	0	264	21
Nanjing City (loan)	2023	China League One	12	1	-		-		-		12	1
Total			223	30	40	0	26	0	0	0	289	30

=== International ===
National team
Year	Apps	Goals
2021	6	1
Total	6	1

Scores and results list China's goal tally first.

No	Date	Venue	Opponent	Score	Result	Competition
1.	7 June 2021	Sharjah Stadium, Sharjah, United Arab Emirates	Philippines	2–0	2–0	2022 FIFA World Cup qualification

== Honours ==
=== Club ===
Shandong Luneng/ Shandong Taishan

- Chinese Super League: 2021.
- Chinese FA Cup: 2014, 2020, 2021, 2022.
- Chinese FA Super Cup: 2015.
