= Han Rongze =

Chinese footballer (born 1993)

Han Rongze 韩镕泽
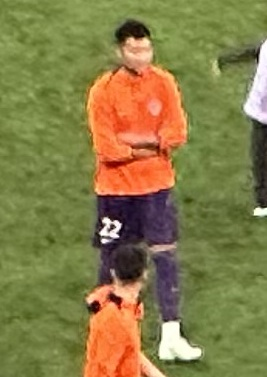
- Han Rongze in May 2025

Personal information
- Full name: Han Rongze
- Date of birth: 15 January 1993 (age 33)
- Place of birth: Shenyang, Liaoning, China
- Height: 1.90 m (6 ft 3 in)
- Position: Goalkeeper

Team information
- Current team: Liaoning Tieren
- Number: 21

Youth career
- Shandong Luneng

Senior career*
Years	Team	Apps	(Gls)
2011	Shandong Youth	12	(0)
2012–2024	Shandong Taishan	37	(0)
2024	→ Cangzhou Mighty Lions (loan)	7	(0)
2025	Qingdao Hainiu	14	(0)
2026–	Liaoning Tieren	9	(0)
- * Club domestic league appearances and goals as of 1 May 2026

Han Rongze (Chinese: 韩镕泽; pinyin: Hán Róngzé; born 15 January 1993) is a Chinese footballer who plays as a goalkeeper for Liaoning Tieren in the Chinese Super League.

== Club career ==
After playing in the youth squad of Shandong Luneng Taishan, Han started his professional football career in 2011. He played for Shandong Youth in the China League Two and made 12 appearances in the season. Han was promoted to Shandong Luneng's first team squad by Henk ten Cate in 2012. He played as a backup for Geng Xiaofeng and then later for Wang Dalei. On 7 May 2014, he was warned by the Chinese Football Association due to a positive sample test for Clenbuterol, which result by mistaking meat with Clenbuterol.

Han finally made his debut for Shandong Luneng on 29 April 2016, in a 3–2 home defeat against Guangzhou R&F. He would go on to establish himself as the first choice goalkeeper within the team 2020 Chinese Super League season and would start within the 2020 Chinese FA Cup final against Jiangsu Suning in a 2–0 victory. The following season would see Wang Dalei reclaim the first choice goalkeeping position as the club won the 2021 Chinese Super League title. While the next season saw Han named as a substitute in the final as the club won the 2022 Chinese FA Cup.

On 15 January 2025, Han joined Chinese Super League club Qingdao Hainiu as free agent.

On 28 December 2025, Han joined Chinese Super League club Liaoning Tieren in 2026 season.

== Career statistics ==
As of match played 1 May 2026

Appearances and goals by club, season and competition
Club	Season	League			National Cup		Continental		Other		Total	
Club	Season	Division	Apps	Goals	Apps	Goals	Apps	Goals	Apps	Goals	Apps	Goals
Shandong Youth	2011	China League Two	12	0	–		–		–		12	0
Shandong Luneng/ Shandong Taishan	2012	Chinese Super League	0	0	0	0	–		–		0	0
Shandong Luneng/ Shandong Taishan	2013	Chinese Super League	0	0	0	0	–		–		0	0
Shandong Luneng/ Shandong Taishan	2014	Chinese Super League	0	0	0	0	0 (Note: Appearances in AFC Champions League)	0	–		0	0
Shandong Luneng/ Shandong Taishan	2015	Chinese Super League	0	0	0	0	0	0	0 (Note: Appearances in Chinese FA Super Cup)	0	0	0
Shandong Luneng/ Shandong Taishan	2016	Chinese Super League	1	0	1	0	1	0	–		3	0
Shandong Luneng/ Shandong Taishan	2017	Chinese Super League	0	0	1	0	–		–		1	0
Shandong Luneng/ Shandong Taishan	2018	Chinese Super League	9	0	4	0	–		–		13	0
Shandong Luneng/ Shandong Taishan	2019	Chinese Super League	4	0	1	0	2	0	–		7	0
Shandong Luneng/ Shandong Taishan	2020	Chinese Super League	15	0	4	0	–		–		19	0
Shandong Luneng/ Shandong Taishan	2021	Chinese Super League	2	0	6	0	–		–		8	0
Shandong Luneng/ Shandong Taishan	2022	Chinese Super League	3	0	0	0	0	0	–		3	0
Shandong Luneng/ Shandong Taishan	2023	Chinese Super League	2	0	2	0	1	0	1	0	6	0
Shandong Luneng/ Shandong Taishan	2024	Chinese Super League	1	0	0	0	0 (Note: Appearances in AFC Champions League Elite)	0	–		1	0
Shandong Luneng/ Shandong Taishan	Total		37	0	19	0	4	0	1	0	61	0
Cangzhou Mighty Lions (loan)	2024	Chinese Super League	7	0	0	0	–		–		7	0
Qingdao Hainiu	2025	Chinese Super League	14	0	2	0	–		–		16	0
Liaoning Tieren	2026	Chinese Super League	9	0	0	0	–		–		9	0
Total			79	0	21	0	4	0	1	0	105	0

== Honours ==
Individual

- Chinese Super League: 2021
- Chinese FA Cup: 2014, 2020, 2021, 2022.
- Chinese FA Super Cup: 2015
