= Huang Cong (footballer, born 1997) =

Chinese association football player

Personal information
- Date of birth: 6 January 1997 (age 29)
- Place of birth: Wuhan, Hubei, China
- Height: 1.82 m (6 ft 0 in)
- Position: Midfielder

Youth career
- 2013–2015: Wuhan FA
- 2015: Dragon Force Porto
- 2015–2016: Gondomar
- 2016: → AS Trenčín (loan)
- 2016–2017: AS Trenčín
- 2017–2018: Leixões
- 2018–2019: Gondomar

Senior career*
| Years | Team | Apps | (Gls) |
| 2016–2017 | AS Trenčín | 0 | (0) |
| 2018–2019 | Gondomar B | 9 | (2) |
| 2019–2023 | Shandong Taishan | 3 | (0) |

International career^{‡}
| 2018 | China U19 | 1 | (0) |
| 2019 | China U23 | 2 | (0) |
- * Club domestic league appearances and goals as of 13:14, 31 January 2023 (UTC) ‡ National team caps and goals as of 13:14, 31 December 2019 (UTC)

Huang Cong (simplified Chinese: 黄聪; traditional Chinese: 黃聰; pinyin: Huáng Cōng; born 6 January 1997) is a Chinese footballer plays as a midfielder.

== Club career ==
Huang Cong would go abroad to further his football development and joined Slovak club AS Trenčín where he would be included in their senior team for the 2016–17 Slovak First Football League season. A move to Portugal would see him play for the Gondomar youth team and then Gondomar B, their reserve team allowed to participate within the Portuguese football pyramid. He would make his debut for them in a league game on 26 August 2018 against Baião in a 1-1 draw.

On 28 February 2019, Huang would return to China to play for top tier club Shandong Luneng (now renamed Shandong Taishan) for the 2019 Chinese Super League campaign. He would make his debut for the club in a Chinese FA Cup game on 1 May 2019 against Zhejiang Energy Greentown F.C. that ended in a 2-1 victory. This would be followed by his first league appearance on 17 October 2020 against Beijing Guoan in a 2-2 draw. He would go on to be a squad player within the team as the club won the 2020 Chinese FA Cup. He would gradually establish himself as a squad regular within the club and was part of the squad that won the 2021 Chinese Super League title.

== Career statistics ==
As of 31 January 2023.

| Club | Season | League | | | Cup | | Continental | | Other | | Total | |
| Club | Season | Division | Apps | Goals | Apps | Goals | Apps | Goals | Apps | Goals | Apps | Goals |
|---|---|---|---|---|---|---|---|---|---|---|---|---|
| AS Trenčín | 2016–17 | Slovak First Football League | 0 | 0 | 0 | 0 | 0 | 0 | - | | 0 | 0 |
| Gondomar B | 2018–19 | Elite Série 2 AF Porto | 9 | 2 | 0 | 0 | - | | - | | 9 | 2 |
| Shandong Luneng/ Shandong Taishan | 2019 | Chinese Super League | 0 | 0 | 1 | 0 | 0 | 0 | - | | 1 | 0 |
| Shandong Luneng/ Shandong Taishan | 2020 | Chinese Super League | 1 | 0 | 3 | 0 | - | | - | | 4 | 0 |
| Shandong Luneng/ Shandong Taishan | 2021 | Chinese Super League | 1 | 0 | 3 | 0 | - | | - | | 4 | 0 |
| Shandong Luneng/ Shandong Taishan | 2022 | Chinese Super League | 1 | 0 | 2 | 0 | 0 | 0 | - | | 3 | 0 |
| Shandong Luneng/ Shandong Taishan | Total | | 3 | 0 | 9 | 0 | 0 | 0 | 0 | 0 | 12 | 0 |
| Career total | | | 12 | 2 | 9 | 0 | 0 | 0 | 0 | 0 | 21 | 2 |

== Honours ==
=== Club ===
Shandong Luneng/ Shandong Taishan

- Chinese Super League: 2021
- Chinese FA Cup: 2020, 2021, 2022.
