= Wang Tong (footballer, born 1993) =

Chinese footballer

Wang Tong 王彤
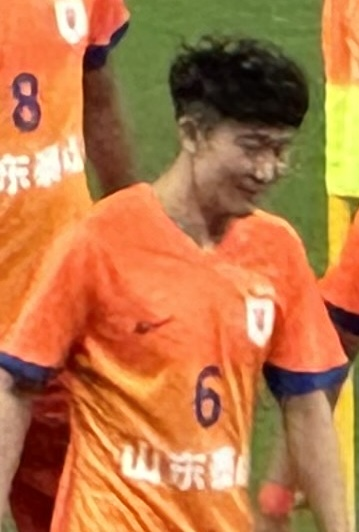
- Wang Tong in August 2024

Personal information
- Full name: Wang Tong
- Date of birth: 12 February 1993 (age 33)
- Place of birth: Shenyang, Liaoning, China
- Height: 1.81 m (5 ft 11 in)
- Position: Defender

Team information
- Current team: Shandong Taishan
- Number: 6

Youth career
- 2004–2009: Shandong Luneng

Senior career*
Years	Team	Apps	(Gls)
2010–	Shandong Taishan	275	(2)

International career^{‡}
2012–2014	China U-19	11	(0)
2013–2016	China U-23	22	(0)
2015–	China	3	(0)
Medal record
Representing China
Men's football
EAFF Championship
Silver medal – second place	2015 China	Team
- * Club domestic league appearances and goals as of 19 November 2026 ‡ National team caps and goals as of 31 December 2019

Wang Tong (Chinese: 王彤; pinyin: Wáng Tóng; Mandarin pronunciation: [wǎŋ.tʰʊ̌ŋ]; born 12 February 1993) is a Chinese footballer who currently plays for Shandong Taishan in the Chinese Super League.

== Club career ==
Wang Tong started his football career playing with Shandong Luneng's youth academy where he impressed then manager Branko Ivanković during many training sessions. He was then included into the first team when he made his debut for the club on 31 October 2010 in a 2-0 win against Changsha Ginde. While he would have limited playing time throughout the season he was part of the squad that won the 2010 Chinese Super League title. Wang cemented his place as a regular in the team's backline during the 2012 season and he continued to be a starter for the club in the 2013 season. The following season he would aid the club by winning the 2014 Chinese FA Cup with them. A consistent regular within the team, he would gain his second league title with the club when he was part of the team that won the 2021 Chinese Super League title.

== International career ==
Wang made his debut for the Chinese national team on 5 August 2015 in a 2-0 win against North Korea.

== Career statistics ==
=== Club statistics ===
As of 31 January 2023.

Appearances and goals by club, season and competition
Club	Season	League			National Cup		Continental		Other		Total	
Club	Season	Division	Apps	Goals	Apps	Goals	Apps	Goals	Apps	Goals	Apps	Goals
Shandong Luneng/ Shandong Taishan	2010	Chinese Super League	2	0	-		-		-		2	0
Shandong Luneng/ Shandong Taishan	2011	Chinese Super League	5	0	1	0	5	0	-		11	0
Shandong Luneng/ Shandong Taishan	2012	Chinese Super League	26	1	3	0	-		-		29	1
Shandong Luneng/ Shandong Taishan	2013	Chinese Super League	27	0	0	0	-		-		27	0
Shandong Luneng/ Shandong Taishan	2014	Chinese Super League	13	0	3	1	4	0	-		20	1
Shandong Luneng/ Shandong Taishan	2015	Chinese Super League	19	0	3	0	3	1	0 (Note: Appearances in Chinese FA Super Cup)	0	25	1
Shandong Luneng/ Shandong Taishan	2016	Chinese Super League	16	0	1	0	4	0	-		21	0
Shandong Luneng/ Shandong Taishan	2017	Chinese Super League	26	0	4	0	-		-		30	0
Shandong Luneng/ Shandong Taishan	2018	Chinese Super League	26	0	6	0	-		-		32	0
Shandong Luneng/ Shandong Taishan	2019	Chinese Super League	23	0	4	0	9	0	-		36	0
Shandong Luneng/ Shandong Taishan	2020	Chinese Super League	14	1	6	1	-		-		20	2
Shandong Luneng/ Shandong Taishan	2021	Chinese Super League	11	0	4	0	-		-		15	0
Shandong Luneng/ Shandong Taishan	2022	Chinese Super League	17	0	4	0	0	0	-		21	0
Shandong Luneng/ Shandong Taishan	Total		225	2	39	2	25	1	0	0	289	5
Career total			225	2	39	2	25	1	0	0	289	5

=== International statistics ===
National team
Year	Apps	Goals
2015	1	0
2016	0	0
2017	0	0
2018	2	0
Total	3	0

== Honours ==
=== Club ===
Shandong Luneng/ Shandong Taishan

- Chinese Super League: 2010, 2021
- Chinese FA Cup: 2014, 2020, 2021, 2022
- Chinese FA Super Cup: 2015
