= Memet-Raim Memet-Ali =

Chinese association football player

Personal information
- Date of birth: 1 September 2000 (age 26)
- Place of birth: China
- Height: 1.74 m (5 ft 9 in)
- Position: Forward

Team information
- Current team: Changchun Yatai
- Number: 18

Youth career
- –2020: Changchun Yatai

Senior career*
Years	Team	Apps	(Gls)
2020–	Changchun Yatai	0	(0)
- * Club domestic league appearances and goals as of 14:01, 31 December 2022 (UTC)

Memet-Raim Memet-Ali (Chinese: 麦麦提热依木·麦麦提艾力; born 1 September 2000) is a Chinese footballer currently playing as a forward for Changchun Yatai.

== Club career ==
Memet-Raim Memet-Ali would play for the Changchun Yatai's youth team before being promoted to the first team squad in 2020. He made his debut for Changchun on 26 November 2020 in a Chinese FA Cup game against Shanghai SIPG in a 4–0 victory, where he also scored his first goal for the club.

== Career statistics ==
As of 31 December 2022.

Club	Season	League			Cup		Continental		Other		Total	
Club	Season	Division	Apps	Goals	Apps	Goals	Apps	Goals	Apps	Goals	Apps	Goals
Changchun Yatai	2020	China League One	0	0	2	1	–		–		2	1
Changchun Yatai	2021	Chinese Super League	0	0	0	0	–		–		0	0
Changchun Yatai	2022	Chinese Super League	0	0	0	0	–		–		0	0
Career total			0	0	2	1	0	0	0	0	2	1
