= Duan Liuyu =

Chinese association football player

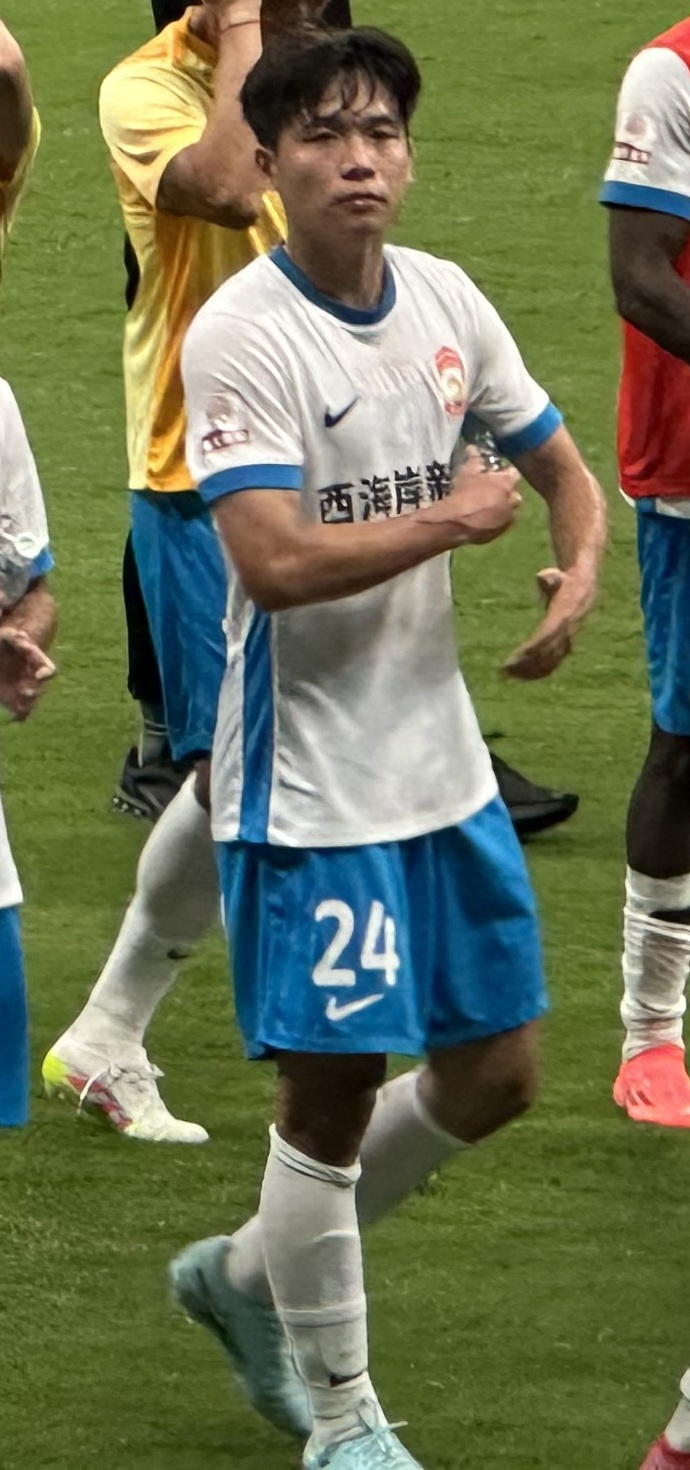

Personal information
- Full name: Duan Liuyu in June 2025
- Date of birth: 24 July 1998 (age 28)
- Place of birth: Chengdu, Sichuan, China
- Height: 1.73 m (5 ft 8 in)
- Positions: Midfielder; right winger

Team information
- Current team: Yunnan Yukun
- Number: 22

Youth career
- 2015–2018: Shandong Taishan
- 2015–2017: → São Paulo (youth loan)

Senior career*
Years	Team	Apps	(Gls)
2018–2026	Shandong Taishan	73	(8)
2023	→ Wuhan Three Towns (loan)	10	(1)
2024–2025	→ Qingdao West Coast (loan)	50	(7)
2026–	Yunnan Yukun	7	(0)

International career
2014	China U16	3	(1)
2019–2020	China U23	4	(1)
- * Club domestic league appearances and goals as of 19 November 2026

Duan Liuyu (simplified Chinese: 段刘愚; traditional Chinese: 段劉愚; pinyin: Duàn Liúyú; born 24 July 1998) is a Chinese footballer currently playing as a midfielder or left-footed right winger for Yunnan Yukun.

== Early life ==
Duan Liuyu started to play football at the age of five and soon joined organised football classes setup by the Shenzhen Football Association before he was admitted to Cuiyuan Middle School (翠园中学) as a football special student in 2010. In 2013, Duan was selected to participate in the China U-16 national team to play in the 2014 AFC U-16 Championship. After the tournament it was discovered that Duan required glasses and was in the honours class within school, he would soon receive the nick name "Glasses striker" by the Chinese media. Duan Liuyu would graduate from Cuiyuan High School (翠园中学高中部) in Luohu District, Shenzhen in 2015.

== Club career ==
On 19 January 2015, Duan Liuyu joined Shandong Taishan as a youth player for a record transfer fee of 1 million RMB, at the time the highest ever paid to a Chinese youth player. Right after the contract signing, Duan Liuyu was sent to São Paulo FC youth training camp for a two year training program. On 15 July 2018, Shandong Taishan announced that they had promoted Duan Liuyu to the first team's roaster. On 1 March 2019 in the first league game for Shandong in the 2019 Chinese Super League season, Duan Liuyu would make his professional football debut against Beijing Renhe in a 1-0 victory.

After making his debut Duan Liuyu would immediately establish himself into the team and scored his first goal in the Chinese Super League in a 3–2 defeat against Henan Jianye on 12 July 2019. A consistent regular within the team, he would gain his first Chinese FA Cup by winning the 2020 Chinese FA Cup against Jiangsu Suning F.C. in a 2-0 victory. This would be followed by his first league title with the club when he was part of the team that won the 2021 Chinese Super League title. Another Chinese FA Cup would be followed up by him winning the 2022 Chinese FA Cup with them.

On 21 July 2026, Duan transferred to Chinese Super League side Yunnan Yukun.

== Career statistics ==
As of 31 January 2023.

Club	Season	League			National Cup		Continental		Other		Total	
Club	Season	Division	Apps	Goals	Apps	Goals	Apps	Goals	Apps	Goals	Apps	Goals
Shandong Taishan	2018	Chinese Super League	0	0	0	0	-		-		0	0
Shandong Taishan	2019	Chinese Super League	19	2	4	0	0	0	-		23	2
Shandong Taishan	2020	Chinese Super League	20	3	5	1	-		-		25	4
Shandong Taishan	2021	Chinese Super League	15	3	7	0	-		-		22	3
Shandong Taishan	2022	Chinese Super League	10	0	3	0	0	0	-		13	0
Shandong Taishan	Total		64	8	19	1	0	0	0	0	83	9
Career total			64	8	19	1	0	0	0	0	83	9

== Honours ==
=== Club ===
Shandong Taishan

- Chinese Super League: 2021.
- Chinese FA Cup: 2020, 2021, 2022.
