= Paulinho (footballer, born 1994) =

Brazilian footballer

Personal information
- Full name: Paulo Henrique Soares dos Santos
- Date of birth: 10 July 1994 (age 32)
- Place of birth: Ceilândia, DF, Brazil
- Height: 1.69 m (5 ft 7 in)
- Position: Winger

Youth career
- 2008–2012: Bahia

Senior career*
Years	Team	Apps	(Gls)
2012	Bahia	0	(0)
2012–2013	Córdoba	6	(0)
2013–2014	Cádiz	1	(0)
2014	Eldense	10	(0)
2015	Beira-Mar	17	(0)
2015–2016	Santa Clara	0	(0)
2016	Farense	16	(2)
2016–2020	Portimonense	87	(17)
2018	→ Porto (loan)	3	(0)
2018	→ Porto B (loan)	1	(0)
2020–2021	Hebei China Fortune	19	(0)
2021–2023	Shanghai Port	50	(8)
2023–2025	Al Bataeh	32	(5)
2026	Al-Orobah		
2026–	Buriram United		
- * Club domestic league appearances and goals as of 8 July 2026

Paulo Henrique Soares dos Santos (born 10 July 1994), simply known as Paulinho, is a Brazilian professional footballer who current plays as a winger.

== Career ==
Born in Ceilândia, Distrito Federal, Paulinho finished his formation with EC Bahia, and appeared on the bench on 11 March 2012, against Juazeiro SC. In December, his rights were sold to a group of investors, which arranged trials to various clubs, including Real Madrid.

On 22 January 2013, Paulinho signed an 18-month contract with Córdoba CF. On 24 March, he played his first match as a professional, in a 4–0 defeat against Real Madrid Castilla.

In July, Paulinho rescinded his contract with the Andalusians, and remained nearly seven months without a club before joining Cádiz CF in Segunda División B. On 25 August 2014, after appearing rarely, he moved to fellow league team CD Eldense.

On 28 January 2015 Paulinho switched teams and countries again, joining Segunda Liga's S.C. Beira-Mar.

In January 2016, Paulinho joined Farense.

On 27 May 2016, Paulinho joined Portimonense on a two-year deal.

On 21 January 2018, Paulinho joined FC Porto on loan for the remainder of the season, in a deal that included a buyout option. Porto activated his buyout option. after, sold him back to Portimonense.

On 9 January 2020, Paulinho joined Chinese Super League side Hebei China Fortune.

On 27 July 2021, Paulinho joined Shanghai Port.

On 13 August 2023, Paulinho joined Al Bataeh.

== Career statistics ==
As of match played 31 January 2023

Appearances and goals by club, season and competition
Club	Season	League			National cup		League cup		Continental		Other		Total	
Club	Season	Division	Apps	Goals	Apps	Goals	Apps	Goals	Apps	Goals	Apps	Goals	Apps	Goals
Bahia	2012	Série A	0	0	0	0	–		0	0	0 (Note: Appearances in Campeonato Baiano)	0	0	0
Córdoba	2012–13	Segunda División	6	0	0	0	–		–		–		6	0
Cádiz	2013–14	Segunda División B	1	0	–		–		–		–		1	0
Eldense	2014–15	Segunda División B	10	0	2	0	–		–		–		12	0
Beira-Mar	2014–15	Segunda Liga	17	0	0	0	0	0	–		–		17	0
Farense	2015–16	LigaPro	16	2	0	0	0	0	–		–		16	2
Portimonense	2016–17	LigaPro	38	9	0	0	1	0	–		–		39	9
Portimonense	2017–18	Primeira Liga	19	2	1	0	2	1	–		–		22	3
Portimonense	2018–19	Primeira Liga	28	6	0	0	0	0	–		–		28	6
Portimonense	2019–20	Primeira Liga	2	0	0	0	2	1	–		–		4	1
Portimonense	Total		87	17	1	0	5	2	0	0	0	0	93	19
Porto (loan)	2017–18	Primeira Liga	3	0	0	0	0	0	0	0	–		3	0
Porto B (loan)	2017–18	LigaPro	1	0	–		–		–		–		1	0
Hebei China Fortune	2020	Chinese Super League	12	0	1	0	–		–		–		13	0
Hebei China Fortune	2021	Chinese Super League	7	0	0	0	–		–		–		7	0
Hebei China Fortune	Total		19	0	1	0	0	0	0	0	0	0	20	0
Shanghai Port	2021	Chinese Super League	9	2	5	2	–		–		–		14	4
Shanghai Port	2022	Chinese Super League	28	3	2	1	–		–		–		30	4
Shanghai Port	Total		37	5	7	3	0	0	0	0	0	0	44	8
Career total			197	24	11	3	5	2	0	0	0	0	213	29
