= Chen Kai =

Chinese association football player

Personal information
- Date of birth: 20 January 1993 (age 33)
- Place of birth: Guiyang, Guizhou, China
- Height: 1.73 m (5 ft 8 in)
- Position: Defender

Youth career
- Metz

Senior career*
Years	Team	Apps	(Gls)
- Chengdu Tiancheng
2016–2017	Nantong Zhiyun	4	(0)

International career
- China U19
- * Club domestic league appearances and goals

Chen Kai (Chinese: 陈凯; born 20 January 1993) is a Chinese former footballer.

== Club career ==
Having started his career in France with Metz, Chen returned to China to forge a career in the lower leagues.

== Career statistics ==
=== Club ===
As of 8 February 2022.

Club	Season	League			Cup		Other		Total	
Club	Season	Division	Apps	Goals	Apps	Goals	Apps	Goals	Apps	Goals
Chengdu Tiancheng	2013	China League One	–		1 (Note: Appearances in the Chinese FA Cup)	0	0	0	1	0
Chengdu Tiancheng	2014	China League One	13	0	0	0	0	0	13	0
Chengdu Tiancheng	Total		13	0	1	0	0	0	14	0
Nantong Zhiyun	2016	China League Two	0	0	0	0	0	0	0	0
Nantong Zhiyun	2017	China League Two	4	0	0	0	0	0	4	0
Nantong Zhiyun	Total		4	0	0	0	0	0	4	0
Career total			17	0	1	0	0	0	18	0
