= Li Fang (footballer) =

Chinese footballer

Personal information
- Date of birth: 27 January 1993 (age 33)
- Place of birth: Guangyuan, Sichuan, China
- Height: 1.75 m (5 ft 9 in)
- Positions: Right-back; forward

Youth career
- 2004–2006: Mingyu Football School
- 2006–2008: Tianjin Teda
- 2008–2010: Sichuan Youth
- 2011–2012: Pombal

Senior career*
Years	Team	Apps	(Gls)
2011	Sichuan FC	14	(3)
2012	Pombal	3	(0)
2012	Sichuan FC	2	(1)
2012–2013	Sporting Covilhã	1	(0)
2014	Chengdu Tiancheng	3	(0)
2016–2019	Chongqing Lifan	9	(0)

International career
2010	China U17		
2011	China U20		
2013–2014	China U22		
- * Club domestic league appearances and goals as of 31 December 2019

Li Fang (Chinese: 李放; pinyin: Lǐ Fàng; born 27 January 1993) is a Chinese footballer.

== Career ==
In 2011, Li started his senior football career with China League Two club Sichuan FC as a forward. He moved to Terceira Divisão side Pombal in December 2011 and played three matches for Pombal in the 2011-12 season. Li returned to Sichuan in June 2012 and then transferred to Segunda Liga side Sporting Covilhã in August 2012. On 28 November 2012, he made his debut for Covilhã in a league match against União da Madeira where he coming on as a substitute for Hugo Moreira in the 86th minute. He left Covilhã at the end of 2012/13 league season.

In February 2014, Li transferred to China League One side Chengdu Tiancheng. He made his debut for Chengdu on 27 July 2014 in a 2–1 home defeat against Qingdao Hainiu, coming on as a substitute for Gao Xiang in the 82nd minute. At Chengdu he would play in midfield and defence, however none of these changes would help in seeing the club avoid relegation at the end of the season, which saw Li become an unattached player in 2015 after Chengdu dissolved due to the downgrade.

Li joined China Super League side Chongqing Lifan in the 2016 season. He made his debut in a 2016 Chinese FA Cup match against Tianjin Quanjian with a 4–0 away defeat, coming on for Yang Yun in the 70th minute.

== Career statistics ==
As of match played 31 December 2019

Appearances and goals by club, season and competition
Club	Season	League			National cup		League cup		Continental		Total	
Club	Season	Division	Apps	Goals	Apps	Goals	Apps	Goals	Apps	Goals	Apps	Goals
Sichuan FC	2011	China League Two	14	3	–		–		–		14	3
Pombal	2011–12	Terceira Divisão	3	0	0	0	–		–		3	0
Sichuan FC	2012	China League Two	2	1	–		–		–		2	1
Sporting Covilhã	2012–13	Segunda Liga	1	0	0	0	0	0	–		1	0
Chengdu Tiancheng	2014	China League One	3	0	0	0	–		–		3	0
Chongqing Lifan	2016	Chinese Super League	0	0	1	0	–		–		1	0
Chongqing Lifan	2017	Chinese Super League	0	0	1	0	–		–		1	0
Chongqing Lifan	2018	Chinese Super League	8	0	1	0	–		–		9	0
Chongqing Lifan	2019	Chinese Super League	1	0	1	0	–		–		2	0
Chongqing Lifan	Total		9	0	4	0	0	0	0	0	13	0
Career total			32	4	4	0	0	0	0	0	36	4
