= Feng Boyuan =

Chinese footballer (born 1995)

Feng Boyuan 冯伯元
Personal information
- Date of birth: 18 January 1995 (age 31)
- Place of birth: Nanjing, Jiangsu, China
- Height: 1.88 m (6 ft 2 in)
- Position: Forward

Team information
- Current team: Shaanxi Union
- Number: 17

Youth career
- Beijing Guoan
- 2013–2015: Liaoning FC

Senior career*
Years	Team	Apps	(Gls)
2016–2018	Liaoning FC	13	(1)
2017	→ NK Rudeš (loan)	4	(0)
2019–2020	Jiangsu Suning	9	(0)
2021–2022	Kunshan FC	54	(21)
2023–2024	Henan FC	37	(4)
2025	Qingdao Hainiu	15	(1)
2026–	Shaanxi Union	0	(0)

International career^{‡}
2017–2018	China U23	9	(1)
- * Club domestic league appearances and goals as of 25 December 2025 ‡ National team caps and goals as of 24 August 2018

Feng Boyuan (Chinese: 冯伯元; born 18 January 1995 in Nanjing) is a Chinese football player who currently plays as a forward for Shaanxi Union.

== Club career ==
Feng Boyuan started his professional football career in 2016 when he was promoted to Liaoning FC's first squad. He made his senior debut and scored his first goal on 11 May 2016 in a 3–1 win against Chengdu Qbao in the 2016 Chinese FA Cup. On 21 May 2016, he made his Super League debut in a 3–0 home loss against Guangzhou Evergrande. On 31 August 2017, Feng was loaned to Croatian First Football League side NK Rudeš. He made his league debut in a 1–0 win to NK Istra. On 11 October 2017, he scored a hat-trick in a 10–0 win against NK Mladost Buzin in the Zagreb's Cup. Feng returned to Liaoning who were newly relegated to the China League One for the 2018 season. On 10 March 2018, he scored his first league goal in a 2–0 home win over Xinjiang Tianshan Leopard. On 12 April 2018, he was handed a 5-match suspension by the CFA for abusing the fans during a league match against Qingdao Huanghai.

On 15 February 2019, Feng transferred to Super League side Jiangsu Suning, signing a four-year contract. He would go on to make his debut in a league game on 9 March 2019 against Shanghai SIPG in a 3-2 defeat. Utilized as a squad player he was part of the team that won the 2020 Chinese Super League title. Unfortunately the clubs parent company Suning Holdings Group were in financial difficulties and dissolved the team on 28 February 2021. On 9 April 2021 he would be free to join second tier club Kunshan FC. He would go on to make his debut in a league game on 25 April 2021 against Beijing BSU in a game that ended in a 2-2 draw. This would be followed by his first goal for the club in a league game on 15 May 2021 against Jiangxi Beidamen in a 6-0 victory. He would go on to establish himself as regular within the team and was part of the squad that won the division and promotion to the top tier at the end of the 2022 China League One campaign.

On 14 January 2025, Feng joined Chinese Super League club Qingdao Hainiu as free agent.

On 3 February 2026, Feng joined China League One club Shaanxi Union.

== Career statistics ==
Statistics accurate as of match played 25 December 2025.

Appearances and goals by club, season and competition
Club	Season	League			National Cup		League Cup		Continental		Total	
Club	Season	Division	Apps	Goals	Apps	Goals	Apps	Goals	Apps	Goals	Apps	Goals
Liaoning FC	2016	Chinese Super League	1	0	2	1	-		-		3	1
Liaoning FC	2017	Chinese Super League	4	0	1	0	-		-		5	0
Liaoning FC	2018	China League One	8	1	1	0	-		-		9	1
Liaoning FC	Total		13	1	4	1	0	0	0	0	17	2
NK_Rudeš (loan)	2017–18	Croatian First Football League	4	0	3	0	2 (Note: Appearances in Zagreb's Cup)	3	-		9	3
Jiangsu Suning	2019	Chinese Super League	8	0	2	1	-		-		10	1
Jiangsu Suning	2020	Chinese Super League	1	0	5	1	-		-		6	1
Jiangsu Suning	Total		9	0	7	2	0	0	0	0	16	2
Kunshan FC	2021	China League One	27	9	1	0	-		-		28	9
Kunshan FC	2022	China League One	27	15	1	0	-		-		28	15
Kunshan FC	Total		54	21	2	0	0	0	0	0	56	21
Henan FC	2023	Chinese Super League	20	3	0	0	-		-		20	3
Henan FC	2024	Chinese Super League	17	1	2	0	-		-		19	1
Henan FC	Total		37	4	2	0	0	0	0	0	39	4
Qingdao Hainiu	2025	Chinese Super League	15	1	2	0	-		-		17	1
Career total			132	27	20	3	2	3	0	0	154	33

== Honours ==
=== Club ===
Jiangsu Suning

- Chinese Super League: 2020

Kunshan FC

- China League One: 2022
