= Luo Senwen =

Chinese footballer (born 1993)

Luo Senwen 罗森文
Personal information
- Date of birth: 16 January 1993 (age 33)
- Place of birth: Chongqing, Sichuan, China
- Height: 1.86 m (6 ft 1 in)
- Position: Midfielder

Team information
- Current team: Qingdao Hainiu
- Number: 31

Youth career
- Luneng Taishan Football School

Senior career*
Years	Team	Apps	(Gls)
2011	→ Shandong Youth (loan)	13	(2)
2012–2015	Shandong Luneng Taishan	6	(0)
2014	→ Chengdu Tiancheng (loan)	8	(1)
2015	→ Hebei China Fortune (loan)	28	(4)
2016–2021	Hebei FC	84	(3)
2019	→ Chongqing Dangdai Lifan (loan)	7	(0)
2021	→ Wuhan Three Towns (loan)	32	(8)
2022–2024	Wuhan Three Towns	70	(0)
2025–	Qingdao Hainiu	43	(1)

International career
2010–2012	China U-20	15	(4)
	China U-23	11	(3)
- * Club domestic league appearances and goals as of 22 November 2026

Luo Senwen (simplified Chinese: 罗森文; traditional Chinese: 羅森文; pinyin: Luó Sēnwén; born 16 January 1993) is a Chinese football player who currently plays as a midfielder for Qingdao Hainiu in the Chinese Super League.

== Club career ==
After playing in the youth squad of Shandong Luneng Taishan, Luo started his professional football career in 2011. He played for Shandong Youth (Shandong Luneng youth team) in the China League Two and scored 2 goals in 13 appearances in the season. On 13 August, he scored his first league goal in a 4–0 home victory against Qingdao QUST. Luo was promoted to Shandong Luneng's first team squad by Henk ten Cate in 2012. He made his debut for Shandong on 1 August 2013 in a 2–0 home win against Guangzhou R&F, coming on as a substitute for Wang Yongpo in the 76th minute. Luo failed to establish with the club and was loaned to China League One side Chengdu Tiancheng for half season in July 2015.

On 14 February 2015, Luo was loaned to China League One side Hebei China Fortune for the 2015 season. He made a permanent transfer to Hebei China Fortune on 31 December 2015 after the club won promotion to the Chinese Super League. He would go on to play a vital part as the club were able to finish seventh and remain within the top tier. After several seasons within the club he would see his playing time diminish and on 29 July 2019 he was loaned out to another top-tier club and his personal hometown team of Chongqing Dangdai Lifan.

On 11 April 2021 he would be loaned out to second-tier club Wuhan Three Towns for the 2021 China League One campaign. The move would turn out to be a big successes and he would go on to establish himself as a vital member of the team and help aid the club to win the league title and gain promotion as the club entered the top tier for the first time in their history. The following campaign Wuhan would make the move permanent and he would be part of the squad that won the 2022 Chinese Super League title for the first time in the clubs history.

On 13 January 2025, Luo joined the Chinese Super League club Qingdao Hainiu as free agent.

== International career ==
Luo received his first called up for China U-20's squad by Su Maozhen in December 2010. He continued to play for U-20s in the 2011 Toulon Tournament and 2011 Weifang Cup. He made 2 appearances in the 2012 AFC U-19 Championship qualification as China U-20 qualified into the 2012 AFC U-19 Championship.

== Career statistics ==
Statistics accurate as of match played 31 January 2023.

Appearances and goals by club, season and competition
Club	Season	League			National Cup		Continental		Other		Total	
Club	Season	Division	Apps	Goals	Apps	Goals	Apps	Goals	Apps	Goals	Apps	Goals
Shandong Youth (loan)	2011	China League Two	13	2	-		-		-		13	2
Shandong Luneng Taishan	2012	Chinese Super League	0	0	0	0	-		-		0	0
Shandong Luneng Taishan	2013	Chinese Super League	6	0	0	0	-		-		6	0
Shandong Luneng Taishan	2014	Chinese Super League	0	0	0	0	1	0	-		1	0
Shandong Luneng Taishan	Total		6	0	0	0	1	0	0	0	7	0
Chengdu Tiancheng (loan)	2014	China League One	8	1	0	0	-		-		8	1
Hebei China Fortune (loan)	2015	China League One	28	4	0	0	-		-		28	4
Hebei China Fortune	2016	Chinese Super League	26	2	2	0	-		-		28	2
Hebei China Fortune	2017	Chinese Super League	19	0	2	0	-		-		21	0
Hebei China Fortune	2018	Chinese Super League	17	1	1	1	-		-		18	2
Hebei China Fortune	2019	Chinese Super League	9	0	1	0	-		-		10	0
Hebei China Fortune	2020	Chinese Super League	13	0	1	0	-		-		14	0
Hebei China Fortune	Total		84	3	7	1	0	0	0	0	91	4
Chongqing Dangdai Lifan (loan)	2019	Chinese Super League	7	0	0	0	-		-		7	0
Wuhan Three Towns (loan)	2021	China League One	32	8	0	0	-		-		32	8
Wuhan Three Towns	2022	Chinese Super League	19	0	3	0	-		-		22	0
Career total			197	18	10	1	1	0	0	0	208	19

== Honours ==
Wuhan Three Towns

- Chinese Super League: 2022
- China League One: 2021
- Chinese FA Super Cup: 2023
