= Liu Binbin =

Chinese footballer

Liu Binbin 刘彬彬
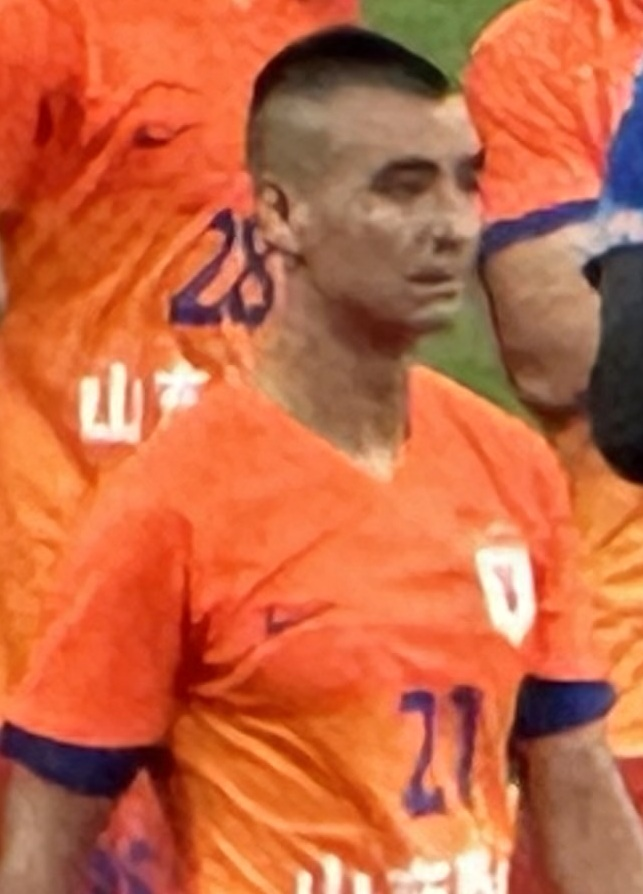
- Liu Binbin in August 2024

Personal information
- Full name: Liu Binbin
- Date of birth: 16 June 1993 (age 33)
- Place of birth: Meixian, Guangdong, China
- Height: 1.77 m (5 ft 9 1/2 in)
- Position: Left winger

Team information
- Current team: Wuhan Three Towns (on loan from Shandong Taishan)
- Number: 33

Youth career
- 2005–2011: Shandong Luneng
- 2010–2011: → FC Metz (loan)

Senior career*
Years	Team	Apps	(Gls)
2011	Shandong Youth	5	(1)
2012–	Shandong Taishan	248	(25)
2026–	→ Wuhan Three Towns (loan)	5	(0)

International career^{‡}
2011–2013	China U-19	11	(3)
2013–2016	China U-23	9	(1)
2014–	China	21	(1)
Medal record
Representing China
Men's football
EAFF Championship
Silver medal – second place	2015 China	Team
- * Club domestic league appearances and goals as of 22 November 2026 ‡ National team caps and goals as of 6 January 2024

Liu Binbin (simplified Chinese: 刘彬彬; traditional Chinese: 劉彬彬; pinyin: Liú Bīnbīn; born 16 June 1993) is a Chinese professional footballer who currently plays as a right-footed left winger for Chinese Super League club Wuhan Three Towns, on loan from Shandong Taishan and the China national team.

== Club career ==
Liu Binbin started his football career when he joined Shandong Luneng's (now known as Shandong Taishan) youth academy in 2005 and was described as a potentially hot prospect for the future. He was loaned out to Ligue 2 club FC Metz along with Xie Pengfei for youth training in 2010. During the 2011 season, Liu returned to Shandong and was then sent out to China League Two side Shandong Youth. He scored his first goal for Shandong Youth on 3 July 2011 in a 4-0 win against Qinghai Youth. Liu was then promoted to the club's first team by Henk ten Cate during the 2012 season. He made his debut for the club on 10 March 2012 in a 2-1 loss against Guizhou Renhe.

The following season he would score his first goal for the club on 17 August 2013, in a league game against Liaoning Whowin in a 2-1 victory. He would go on to establish himself a vital member in the teams and would aid the club by winning the 2014 Chinese FA Cup with them. A consistent regular within the team, he would gain his second Chinese FA Cup by winning the 2020 Chinese FA Cup against Jiangsu Suning F.C. in a 2-0 victory. This would be followed by his first league title with the club when he was part of the team that won the 2021 Chinese Super League title. Another Chinese FA Cup would be followed up by him winning the 2022 Chinese FA Cup with them.

== International career ==
Liu was first called up to the Chinese under-20 national team by Su Maozhen in June 2010 and played for the under-20 national team at the 2010 AFC U-19 Championship. He continued to be called up to the under-20 side by Jan Olde Riekerink who took charge the team in 2011 and played in the 2011 Toulon Tournament. Liu scored one goal in three appearances during 2012 AFC U-19 Championship qualification as his team qualified for the 2012 AFC U-19 Championship. Liu made his debut for the Chinese national team on 13 December 2014 in a 4–0 win against Kyrgyzstan; however, the match was not recognised as an international "A" match by FIFA. He made his official debut on 21 December 2014 in a 0-0 draw against Palestine.

Liu was a member of China's squad for the 2015 AFC Asian Cup, making one appearance as an 81st minute substitute for Zhang Cheng in a 2–1 win over Uzbekistan at the group stage.

On 12 December 2023, Liu was named in China's squad for the 2023 AFC Asian Cup in Qatar.

On 25 June 2026, Liu was loaned to Chinese Super League side Wuhan Three Towns for the rest of 2026 season.

== Career statistics ==
=== Club statistics ===
As of 31 January 2023.

Appearances and goals by club, season and competition
Club	Season	League			National Cup		Continental		Other		Total	
Club	Season	Division	Apps	Goals	Apps	Goals	Apps	Goals	Apps	Goals	Apps	Goals
Shandong Youth	2011	China League Two	5	1	-		-		-		5	1
Shandong Luneng/ Shandong Taishan	2012	Chinese Super League	11	0	0	0	-		-		11	0
Shandong Luneng/ Shandong Taishan	2013	Chinese Super League	13	1	1	0	-		-		14	1
Shandong Luneng/ Shandong Taishan	2014	Chinese Super League	29	5	7	2	4	1	-		40	8
Shandong Luneng/ Shandong Taishan	2015	Chinese Super League	22	4	3	0	6	0	1 (Note: Appearances in Chinese FA Super Cup)	0	32	4
Shandong Luneng/ Shandong Taishan	2016	Chinese Super League	20	3	1	1	10	0	-		31	4
Shandong Luneng/ Shandong Taishan	2017	Chinese Super League	25	1	1	0	-		-		26	1
Shandong Luneng/ Shandong Taishan	2018	Chinese Super League	9	0	1	0	-		-		10	0
Shandong Luneng/ Shandong Taishan	2019	Chinese Super League	17	5	5	0	5	1	-		27	6
Shandong Luneng/ Shandong Taishan	2020	Chinese Super League	13	1	3	0	-		-		16	1
Shandong Luneng/ Shandong Taishan	2021	Chinese Super League	19	0	0	0	-		-		19	0
Shandong Luneng/ Shandong Taishan	2022	Chinese Super League	22	2	2	1	0	0	-		24	3
Shandong Luneng/ Shandong Taishan	Total		200	22	24	4	25	2	1	0	250	28
Total			205	23	24	4	25	2	1	0	255	29

=== International statistics ===
National team
Year	Apps	Goals
2014	1	0
2015	3	0
2016	0	0
2017	0	0
2018	0	0
2019	0	0
2020	0	0
2021	4	1
2022	3	0
2023	6	0
2024	4	0
Total	21	1

Scores and results list China's goal tally first.

No	Date	Venue	Opponent	Score	Result	Competition
1.	11 June 2021	Sharjah Stadium, Sharjah	Maldives	1–0	5–0	2022 FIFA World Cup qualification

== Honours ==
Shandong Luneng/Shandong Taishan

- Chinese Super League: 2021.
- Chinese FA Cup: 2014, 2020, 2021, 2022.
- Chinese FA Super Cup: 2015

Individual

- Chinese Football Association Young Player of the Year: 2014
