= 2021 Chinese Super League =

Chinese Super League
- Season: 2021
- Dates: 20 April – 15 August (Regular season); 12 December 2021 – 4 January 2022 (Championship and Relegation stage); 7–12 January 2022 (Promotion–relegation play-off)
- Champions: Shandong Taishan; 4th CSL title 5th Chinese title
- AFC Champions League: Shandong Taishan; Shanghai Port; Guangzhou; Changchun Yatai
- Matches: 176
- Goals: 447 (2.54 per match)
- Top goalscorer: Júnior Negrão (14 goals)
- Biggest home win: Guangzhou 5–0 Qingdao (11 August 2021); Shanghai Port 5–0 Tianjin Jinmen Tiger (15 August 2021); Guangzhou City 5–0 Beijing Guoan (19 December 2021)
- Biggest away win: Qingdao 0–6 Guangzhou (21 July 2021)
- Highest scoring: Tianjin Jinmen Tiger 1–6 Shanghai Port (22 April 2021); Guangzhou 5–2 Cangzhou Mighty Lions (2 August 2021); Qingdao 2–5 Wuhan (15 December 2021)
- Longest winning run: 10 matches Shandong Taishan
- Longest unbeaten run: 13 matches Shandong Taishan
- Longest winless run: 12 matches Wuhan
- Longest losing run: 11 matches Qingdao
- Highest attendance: 28,252; Guangzhou 2–0 Shenzhen (2 May 2021)
- Lowest attendance: 335; Cangzhou Mighty Lions 0–0; Henan Songshan Longmen (27 April 2021)
- Total attendance: 111,732
- Average attendance: 4,656

The 2021 Chinese Super League, officially known as the 2021 Ping An Chinese Football Association Super League (Chinese: 2021中国平安中国足球协会超级联赛) for sponsorship reasons, was the 18th season since the establishment of the Chinese Super League. The league title sponsor is Ping An Insurance.

Jiangsu were the defending champions, but they folded on 28 February 2021, and were disqualified by the Chinese Football Association on 29 March 2021.

== Club changes ==
Clubs promoted from 2020 China League One

- Changchun Yatai

Dissolved entries

- ~~Jiangsu (Jiangsu Suning)~~

Changchun Yatai returns to the division after a 2-year absence. Cangzhou Mighty Lions were reprieved from relegation after finishing bottom in the previous season due to the dissolution of Jiangsu.

=== Name changes ===
In December 2020, the CFA issued a policy to "neutralize" the names of all professional football clubs. Club names cannot contain any term of a sponsorship or commercial nature, and non-Chinese characters cannot be used. Most Chinese football clubs had to be renamed. There were some debates as to whether or not some long-existing club names, for example, "Shandong Taishan" and "Beijing Guoan", were acceptable. After Henan Jianye was renamed to "Henan Luoyang Longmen", club fans protested in front of the club stadium. Some clubs, including the 2020 Chinese Super League winner Jiangsu, China League One team Beijing Chengfeng and China League Two team Yancheng Luzhiying, dissolved subsequent to their renaming.

| Current name | Previous name | Date changed | Ref. |
|---|---|---|---|
| Guangzhou City | Guangzhou R&F | December 2020 | |
| Guangzhou | Guangzhou Evergrande Taobao | January 2021 | |
| Shandong Taishan | Shandong Luneng Taishan | January 2021 | |
| Shanghai Port | Shanghai SIPG | January 2021 | |
| Cangzhou Mighty Lions (Note: moved from Shijiazhuang to Cangzhou.) | Shijiazhuang Ever Bright | January 2021 | |
| Tianjin Jinmen Tiger | Tianjin TEDA | January 2021 | |
| Qingdao | Qingdao Huanghai | February 2021 | |
| Shanghai Shenhua | Shanghai Greenland Shenhua | February 2021 | |
| Hebei | Hebei China Fortune | February 2021 | |
| Wuhan | Wuhan Zall | February 2021 | |
| Henan Songshan Longmen | Henan Jianye | February 2021 | |
| Chongqing Liangjiang Athletic | Chongqing Dangdai Lifan | March 2021 | |
| Beijing Guoan | Beijing Sinobo Guoan | March 2021 | |
| Jiangsu | Jiangsu Suning | February 2021 (Note: Club dissolved four weeks later on 28 February 2021.) | |

== Rule changes ==
The CFA imposed a salary cap on the Super League in December 2020, taking effect with the 2021 season. Each club's total player wages are capped at ¥600 million, with a separate limit of €10 million for foreign players. Individual player salaries are also capped, at ¥5 million before tax for Chinese players, and €3 million for foreign players.

== Clubs ==
=== Personnel and stadiums ===
| Team | Head coach | City | Stadium | Capacity | 2020 season |
|---|---|---|---|---|---|
| Guangzhou | (China) Zheng Zhi (player/manager) | Guangzhou | Tianhe Stadium | 54,856 | 2nd |
| Beijing Guoan | (Croatia) Slaven Bilić | Beijing | Workers' Stadium | 66,161 | 3rd |
| Shanghai Port | (Croatia) Ivan Leko | Shanghai | Yuanshen Sports Centre Stadium | 16,000 | 4th |
| Shandong Taishan | (China) Hao Wei | Jinan | Jinan Olympic Sports Center Stadium | 56,808 | 5th |
| Chongqing Liangjiang Athletic | (South Korea) Chang Woe-ryong | Chongqing | Chongqing Olympic Sports Center | 58,680 | 6th |
| Shanghai Shenhua | (China) Mao Yijun (caretaker) | Shanghai | Hongkou Football Stadium | 33,060 | 7th |
| Hebei | (South Korea) Kim Jong-boo | Langfang | Langfang Stadium | 30,040 | 8th |
| Henan Songshan Longmen | (Spain) Antonio Gómez-Carreño Escalona (caretaker) | Zhengzhou | Hanghai Stadium | 29,860 | 9th |
| Tianjin Jinmen Tiger | (China) Yu Genwei | Tianjin | Tianjin Olympic Centre | 54,696 | 10th |
| Guangzhou City | (Netherlands) Jean-Paul van Gastel | Guangzhou | Yuexiushan Stadium | 18,000 | 11th |
| Dalian Pro | (Spain) José González | Dalian | Dalian Sports Centre Stadium | 60,832 | 12th |
| Shenzhen | (China) Zhang Xiaorui (caretaker) | Shenzhen | Shenzhen Universiade Sports Centre | 60,334 | 13th |
| Qingdao | (China) Yang Weijian (caretaker) | Qingdao | Conson Stadium | 45,000 | 14th |
| Wuhan | (China) Li Jinyu | Wuhan | Wuhan Five Rings Sports Center | 30,000 | 15th (Relegation play-offs winner) |
| Changchun Yatai | (China) Chen Yang | Changchun | Changchun Stadium | 41,638 | CL1, 1st |
| Cangzhou Mighty Lions | (Serbia) Svetozar Šapurić | Cangzhou | Cangzhou Stadium | 31,836 | 16th |

=== Locations ===
Location of teams in 2021 Chinese Super League

=== Managerial changes ===
| Team | Outgoing manager | Manner of departure | Date of vacancy | Position in table | Incoming manager | Date of appointment |
|---|---|---|---|---|---|---|
| Guangzhou City | (Netherlands) Giovanni van Bronckhorst | Mutual consent | 3 December 2020 | Pre-season | (Netherlands) Jean-Paul van Gastel | 22 February 2021 |
| Wuhan | (China) Pang Li (caretaker) | End of caretaker spell | 27 December 2020 | Pre-season | (China) Li Xiaopeng | 27 December 2020 |
| Shanghai Port | (Portugal) Vítor Pereira | Mutual consent | 31 December 2020 | Pre-season | (Croatia) Ivan Leko | 1 January 2021 |
| Beijing Guoan | (France) Bruno Génésio | Mutual consent | 6 January 2021 | Pre-season | (Croatia) Slaven Bilić | 6 January 2021 |
| Dalian Pro | (Spain) Rafael Benítez | Mutual consent | 23 January 2021 | Pre-season | (Spain) José González | 18 April 2021 |
| Hebei | (China) Xie Feng | Mutual consent | 28 March 2021 | Pre-season | (South Korea) Kim Jong-boo | 28 March 2021 |
| Tianjin Jinmen Tiger | (China) Wang Baoshan | Mutual consent | 31 March 2021 | Pre-season | (China) Yu Genwei | 31 March 2021 |
| Shenzhen | (Netherlands) Jordi Cruyff | Signed by Barcelona | 3 June 2021 | 7th | (Spain) José Carlos Granero | 3 June 2021 |
| Shanghai Shenhua | (South Korea) Choi Kang-hee | Resigned | 7 August 2021 | 9th | (China) Mao Yijun (caretaker) | 7 August 2021 |
| Cangzhou Mighty Lions | (Iran) Afshin Ghotbi | Mutual consent | 6 September 2021 | 13th | (China) Liu Yan (caretaker) | 6 September 2021 |
| Guangzhou | (Italy) Fabio Cannavaro | Mutual consent | 28 September 2021 | 2nd | (China) Zheng Zhi (player/manager) | 7 December 2021 |
| Henan Songshan Longmen | (Spain) Javier Pereira | Mutual consent | 7 October 2021 | 10th | (Spain) Antonio Gómez-Carreño Escalona (caretaker) | 7 October 2021 |
| Cangzhou Mighty Lions | (China) Liu Yan (caretaker) | End of caretaker spell | 5 November 2021 | 13th | (Serbia) Svetozar Šapurić | 5 November 2021 |
| Wuhan | (China) Li Xiaopeng | Signed by China | 3 December 2021 | 11th | (China) Li Jinyu | 4 December 2021 |
| Qingdao | (China) Wu Jingui | Resigned | 13 December 2021 | 16th | (China) Yang Weijian (caretaker) | 13 December 2021 |
| Shenzhen | (Spain) José Carlos Granero | End of contract | 31 December 2021 | 5th | (China) Zhang Xiaorui (caretaker) | 31 December 2021 |

=== Foreign players ===
- Players name in **bold** indicates the players that were registered during the mid-season transfer window.
- Players name in ITALICS indicates the players that left their respective clubs during the mid-season transfer window.

| Team | Player 1 | Player 2 | Player 3 | Player 4 | Player 5 | Naturalized players | Hong Kong/Macau/ Taiwan Players^{1} | Former players |
|---|---|---|---|---|---|---|---|---|
| Beijing Guoan | (Brazil) **Anderson Silva** | | | | | (England) → (China) Nico Yennaris^{2} (Norway) → (China) John Hou Sæter^{2} | | (Brazil) Fernando (Brazil) Lucas Souza (Brazil) Renato Augusto (Democratic Republic of the Congo) Cédric Bakambu (South Korea) Kim Min-jae (Spain) Jonathan Viera |
| Cangzhou Mighty Lions | (Democratic Republic of the Congo) **Oscar Maritu** | (Senegal) André Senghor | (Zambia) Stoppila Sunzu | | | | | (Brazil) Muriqui (Norway) Adama Diomande (Uzbekistan) Odil Ahmedov |
| Changchun Yatai | (Brazil) Erik | (Brazil) Júnior Negrão | (Brazil) Serginho | (Denmark) Jores Okore | | | (Chinese Taipei) Chen Po-liang | (Brazil) **Lucas Souza** (Netherlands) Richairo Živković (Nigeria) Aaron Samuel Olanare |
| Chongqing Liangjiang Athletic | (Brazil) Fernandinho | (Ecuador) Miller Bolaños | (Uzbekistan) Dostonbek Tursunov | | | | | (Brazil) Marcelo Cirino (Brazil) Marcinho |
| Dalian Pro | (Ghana) Emmanuel Boateng | (Sweden) Marcus Danielson | (Sweden) Sam Larsson | | | | | (Brazil) Jailson (Venezuela) **Salomón Rondón** |
| Guangzhou | | | | | | (England) → (China) Tyias Browning^{2} | | (Brazil) → (China) Alan (Brazil) → (China) Aloísio (Brazil) → (China) Elkeson (Brazil) Fernandinho (Brazil) Paulinho (Brazil) Ricardo Goulart (Brazil) Talisca |
| Guangzhou City | (Belgium) Mousa Dembélé | (Brazil) Guilherme | (Brazil) Tiago Leonço | (Colombia) Jown Cardona | | | (Hong Kong) Tan Chun Lok | (Sweden) Gustav Svensson |
| Hebei | (Bosnia and Herzegovina) Samir Memišević | (Brazil) **Leonardo** | (Norway) Ole Selnæs | (Portugal) **João Silva** | | | | (Brazil) Marcão (Brazil) Paulinho (Portugal) → (China) Chen Jiayu^{2} |
| Henan Songshan Longmen | (Bosnia and Herzegovina) Toni Šunjić | (Brazil) Fernando Karanga | (Brazil) Henrique Dourado | (Brazil) Ivo | (Sierra Leone) Mohamed Buya Turay | | (Chinese Taipei) Tim Chow | |
| Qingdao | (Croatia) Dejan Radonjić | (France) Romain Alessandrini | (Ghana) **Emmanuel Agyemang-Badu** | (Serbia) Jagoš Vuković | | | | (Norway) Fredrik Ulvestad (Slovenia) Denis Popović |
| Shandong Taishan | (Belgium) Marouane Fellaini | (Brazil) **Jadson** | (Brazil) Moisés | (South Korea) Son Jun-ho | | (Portugal) → (China) Pedro Delgado | | (Brazil) Leonardo (Brazil) Róger Guedes |
| Shanghai Port | (Australia) Aaron Mooy | (Brazil) Oscar | (Brazil) **Paulinho** | (Brazil) Ricardo Lopes | (Croatia) **Ante Majstorović** | | | (Austria) Marko Arnautović |
| Shanghai Shenhua | (Cameroon) Christian Bassogog | (Colombia) Giovanni Moreno | (Croatia) Matej Jonjić | (Guinea) **Lonsana Doumbouya** | (Poland) Adrian Mierzejewski | (Gabon) → (China) Alexander N'Doumbou^{2} (Italy) → (China) Denny Wang^{2} | | (South Korea) Kim Shin-wook |
| Shenzhen | (Brazil) Alan Kardec | (Colombia) Juan Fernando Quintero | (Ghana) Frank Acheampong | (Ghana) Mubarak Wakaso | (Iran) Morteza Pouraliganji | | (Hong Kong) Dai Wai Tsun | |
| Tianjin Jinmen Tiger | (Brazil) **Magno Cruz** | (France) Jules Iloki | (Hungary) Tamás Kádár | (Netherlands) **Marko Vejinović** | | | | |
| Wuhan | (Brazil) **Anderson Lopes** | (Brazil) **Rafael Silva** | | | | | | (Brazil) Léo Baptistão (Cameroon) Stéphane Mbia (Ivory Coast) Jean Evrard Kouassi (Martinique) Yoann Arquin (Portugal) Daniel Carriço |

- **^1** For Hong Kong, Macau, or Taiwanese players, if they are non-naturalized and were registered as professional footballers in Hong Kong's, Macau's, or Chinese Taipei's football association for the first time, they are recognized as native players. Otherwise they are recognized as foreign players.
- **^2** Naturalized players whose parents or grandparents were born in Mainland China, thus are regarded as local players.

== Neutral grounds for 2021 season ==
=== Guangzhou stadia ===
- Tianhe Stadium
- Yuexiushan Stadium
- Guangzhou Higher Education Mega Center Central Stadium
- Huadu Stadium

=== Suzhou stadia ===
- Kunshan Sports Centre Stadium
- Suzhou Olympic Sports Centre
- Suzhou Olympic Sports Centre Outer Field
- Suzhou Sports Center
- Jiangyin Sports Centre

== Regular season ==
=== Group A (Guangzhou stadia) ===
==== League table ====
| Pos | Team | Pld | W | D | L | GF | GA | GD | Pts | Qualification or relegation |
|---|---|---|---|---|---|---|---|---|---|---|
| 1 | Shandong Taishan | 14 | 10 | 3 | 1 | 30 | 10 | +20 | 33 | Qualification for Championship stage |
| 2 | Guangzhou | 14 | 9 | 3 | 2 | 39 | 14 | +25 | 30 | Qualification for Championship stage |
| 3 | Shenzhen | 14 | 7 | 3 | 4 | 24 | 18 | +6 | 24 | Qualification for Championship stage |
| 4 | Guangzhou City | 14 | 5 | 6 | 3 | 21 | 21 | 0 | 21 | Qualification for Championship stage |
| 5 | Henan Songshan Longmen | 14 | 4 | 6 | 4 | 13 | 14 | −1 | 18 | Qualification for Relegation stage |
| 6 | Chongqing Liangjiang Athletic | 14 | 3 | 2 | 9 | 16 | 28 | −12 | 11 | Qualification for Relegation stage |
| 7 | Cangzhou Mighty Lions | 14 | 2 | 4 | 8 | 13 | 23 | −10 | 10 | Qualification for Relegation stage |
| 8 | Qingdao | 14 | 2 | 1 | 11 | 6 | 34 | −28 | 7 | Qualification for Relegation stage |

Source: CSL, Soccerway
Rules for classification:
- During season: 1) Points; 2) Goal difference; 3) Goals scored.
- After season: 1) Points; 2) Head-to-head points; 3) Head-to-head goal difference; 4) Head-to-head goals scored; 5) Scores of the weight ratio of the reserve league and youth leagues.

==== Results ====
| Home \ Away | CZL | CQL | GZH | GZC | HSL | QDA | SDT | SZH |
|---|---|---|---|---|---|---|---|---|
| Cangzhou Mighty Lions | — | 1–1 | 0–2 | 0–2 | 0–0 | 2–0 | 0–2 | 2–1 |
| Chongqing Liangjiang Athletic | 2–2 | — | 1–5 | 4–0 | 3–2 | 1–0 | 0–2 | 0–3 |
| Guangzhou | 5–2 | 3–1 | — | 2–2 | 2–0 | 5–0 | 2–1 | 2–0 |
| Guangzhou City | 0–0 | 3–1 | 3–3 | — | 1–1 | 4–2 | 1–3 | 2–4 |
| Henan Songshan Longmen | 2–1 | 1–0 | 1–1 | 1–1 | — | 2–0 | 1–1 | 1–2 |
| Qingdao | 2–1 | 1–0 | 0–6 | 0–1 | 0–1 | — | 0–5 | 1–4 |
| Shandong Taishan | 2–1 | 3–1 | 1–0 | 0–0 | 2–0 | 2–0 | — | 4–2 |
| Shenzhen | 2–1 | 2–1 | 2–1 | 0–1 | 0–0 | 0–0 | 2–2 | — |

Source: CSL
Legend: Blue = home team win; Yellow = draw; Red = away team win.
For upcoming matches, an "a" indicates there is an article about the rivalry between the two participants.

==== Positions by round ====
To preserve chronological evolvements, any postponed matches are not included to the round at which they were originally scheduled, but added to the full round they were played immediately afterwards. For example, if a match is scheduled for round 7, but then played between rounds 8 and 9, it will be added to the standings for round 8.

| Team ╲ Round | 1 | 2 | 3 | 4 | 5 | 6 | 7 | 8 | 9 | 10 | 11 | 12 | 13 | 14 |
|---|---|---|---|---|---|---|---|---|---|---|---|---|---|---|
| Shandong Taishan | 1 | 1 | 2 | 1 | 1 | 1 | 1 | 1 | 3 | 1 | 1 | 1 | 1 | 1 |
| Guangzhou | 4 | 5 | 3 | 2 | 2 | 2 | 2 | 2 | 1 | 3 | 2 | 2 | 2 | 2 |
| Shenzhen | 2 | 3 | 5 | 4 | 4 | 3 | 3 | 3 | 2 | 2 | 3 | 3 | 3 | 3 |
| Guangzhou City | 4 | 2 | 1 | 3 | 3 | 4 | 4 | 4 | 5 | 4 | 4 | 4 | 4 | 4 |
| Henan Songshan Longmen | 6 | 6 | 7 | 7 | 7 | 6 | 5 | 5 | 4 | 5 | 5 | 5 | 5 | 5 |
| Chongqing Liangjiang Athletic | 8 | 8 | 8 | 6 | 6 | 7 | 7 | 8 | 6 | 6 | 6 | 6 | 6 | 6 |
| Cangzhou Mighty Lions | 6 | 6 | 6 | 8 | 8 | 8 | 8 | 7 | 8 | 7 | 7 | 7 | 7 | 7 |
| Qingdao | 2 | 3 | 4 | 5 | 5 | 5 | 6 | 6 | 7 | 8 | 8 | 8 | 8 | 8 |

| Qualification to Championship stage |
| Qualification to Relegation stage |

Source: CSL, Soccerway

==== Results by match played ====
| Team ╲ Round | 1 | 2 | 3 | 4 | 5 | 6 | 7 | 8 | 9 | 10 | 11 | 12 | 13 | 14 |
|---|---|---|---|---|---|---|---|---|---|---|---|---|---|---|
| Cangzhou Mighty Lions | L | D | D | L | D | L | L | W | L | D | L | L | W | L |
| Chongqing Liangjiang Athletic | L | L | D | W | L | L | L | L | W | D | L | W | L | L |
| Guangzhou | D | L | W | W | D | W | W | D | W | L | W | W | W | W |
| Guangzhou City | D | W | W | L | D | D | D | D | L | W | W | W | L | D |
| Henan Songshan Longmen | L | D | D | L | D | W | D | D | W | L | W | L | W | D |
| Qingdao | W | D | L | L | W | L | L | L | L | L | L | L | L | L |
| Shandong Taishan | W | W | D | W | D | D | W | W | L | W | W | W | W | W |
| Shenzhen | W | D | L | W | D | W | W | D | W | W | L | L | L | W |

Source: CSL, Soccerway
W = Win; D = Draw; L = Loss

=== Group B (Suzhou stadia) ===
==== League table ====
| Pos | Team | Pld | W | D | L | GF | GA | GD | Pts | Qualification or relegation |
|---|---|---|---|---|---|---|---|---|---|---|
| 1 | Changchun Yatai | 14 | 8 | 4 | 2 | 23 | 11 | +12 | 28 (Note: Head-to-head results: Changchun Yatai 2–1 Shanghai Port, Shanghai Port 0–0 Changchun Yatai.) | Qualification for Championship stage |
| 2 | Shanghai Port | 14 | 8 | 4 | 2 | 30 | 7 | +23 | 28 | Qualification for Championship stage |
| 3 | Beijing Guoan | 14 | 7 | 3 | 4 | 19 | 16 | +3 | 24 | Qualification for Championship stage |
| 4 | Hebei | 14 | 6 | 5 | 3 | 12 | 11 | +1 | 23 | Qualification for Championship stage |
| 5 | Shanghai Shenhua | 14 | 6 | 4 | 4 | 21 | 17 | +4 | 22 | Qualification for Relegation stage |
| 6 | Wuhan | 14 | 1 | 8 | 5 | 11 | 19 | −8 | 11 | Qualification for Relegation stage |
| 7 | Tianjin Jinmen Tiger | 14 | 2 | 3 | 9 | 11 | 29 | −18 | 9 | Qualification for Relegation stage |
| 8 | Dalian Pro | 14 | 2 | 1 | 11 | 12 | 29 | −17 | 7 | Qualification for Relegation stage |

Source: CSL, Soccerway
Rules for classification:
- During season: 1) Points; 2) Goal difference; 3) Goals scored.
- After season: 1) Points; 2) Head-to-head points; 3) Head-to-head goal difference; 4) Head-to-head goals scored; 5) Scores of the weight ratio of the reserve league and youth leagues.
  Notes:

==== Results ====
| Home \ Away | BJG | CCY | DLP | HEB | SHP | SHS | TJT | WUH |
|---|---|---|---|---|---|---|---|---|
| Beijing Guoan | — | 2–1 | 2–0 | 2–1 | 1–1 | 4–2 | 0–0 | 2–1 |
| Changchun Yatai | 2–0 | — | 3–1 | 3–0 | 2–1 | 1–0 | 0–0 | 0–0 |
| Dalian Pro | 0–1 | 1–2 | — | 0–1 | 0–5 | 2–4 | 1–0 | 1–1 |
| Hebei | 0–0 | 2–1 | 1–0 | — | 1–0 | 1–1 | 2–1 | 1–1 |
| Shanghai Port | 3–1 | 0–0 | 3–0 | 1–0 | — | 1–0 | 5–0 | 3–0 |
| Shanghai Shenhua | 2–1 | 1–2 | 3–2 | 0–0 | 1–1 | — | 1–0 | 0–0 |
| Tianjin Jinmen Tiger | 3–1 | 1–4 | 1–3 | 0–1 | 1–6 | 1–3 | — | 2–1 |
| Wuhan | 0–2 | 2–2 | 2–1 | 1–1 | 0–0 | 1–3 | 1–1 | — |

Source: CSL
Legend: Blue = home team win; Yellow = draw; Red = away team win.
For upcoming matches, an "a" indicates there is an article about the rivalry between the two participants.

==== Positions by round ====
To preserve chronological evolvements, any postponed matches are not included to the round at which they were originally scheduled, but added to the full round they were played immediately afterwards. For example, if a match is scheduled for round 7, but then played between rounds 8 and 9, it will be added to the standings for round 8.

| Team ╲ Round | 1 | 2 | 3 | 4 | 5 | 6 | 7 | 8 | 9 | 10 | 11 | 12 | 13 | 14 |
|---|---|---|---|---|---|---|---|---|---|---|---|---|---|---|
| Changchun Yatai | 2 | 3 | 4 | 5 | 3 | 5 | 3 | 2 | 3 | 2 | 2 | 2 | 2 | 1 |
| Shanghai Port | 1 | 1 | 1 | 1 | 1 | 1 | 1 | 1 | 1 | 1 | 1 | 1 | 1 | 2 |
| Beijing Guoan | 6 | 8 | 5 | 4 | 2 | 4 | 5 | 5 | 5 | 4 | 4 | 5 | 5 | 3 |
| Hebei | 4 | 3 | 3 | 3 | 5 | 3 | 4 | 4 | 2 | 3 | 3 | 4 | 4 | 4 |
| Shanghai Shenhua | 2 | 2 | 2 | 2 | 4 | 2 | 2 | 3 | 4 | 5 | 5 | 3 | 3 | 5 |
| Wuhan | 4 | 5 | 6 | 7 | 8 | 7 | 7 | 6 | 6 | 7 | 6 | 7 | 6 | 6 |
| Tianjin Jinmen Tiger | 8 | 6 | 7 | 8 | 6 | 6 | 6 | 7 | 7 | 8 | 8 | 6 | 7 | 7 |
| Dalian Pro | 6 | 7 | 8 | 6 | 7 | 8 | 8 | 8 | 8 | 6 | 7 | 8 | 8 | 8 |

| Qualification to Championship stage |
| Qualification to Relegation stage |

Source: CSL, Soccerway

==== Results by match played ====
| Team ╲ Round | 1 | 2 | 3 | 4 | 5 | 6 | 7 | 8 | 9 | 10 | 11 | 12 | 13 | 14 |
|---|---|---|---|---|---|---|---|---|---|---|---|---|---|---|
| Beijing Guoan | L | L | W | W | W | D | L | W | D | W | W | D | L | W |
| Changchun Yatai | W | D | D | D | W | L | W | W | W | D | W | W | W | L |
| Dalian Pro | L | L | L | W | L | L | D | L | L | L | W | L | L | L |
| Hebei | D | W | W | D | L | W | L | D | W | W | D | D | L | W |
| Shanghai Port | W | W | D | D | W | D | W | W | D | W | L | W | W | L |
| Shanghai Shenhua | W | W | D | D | L | W | W | L | D | L | D | L | W | W |
| Tianjin Jinmen Tiger | L | D | L | L | W | D | L | L | L | L | L | D | W | L |
| Wuhan | D | L | D | L | L | D | D | D | D | D | L | D | L | W |

Source: CSL, Soccerway
W = Win; D = Draw; L = Loss

== Championship stage ==
=== League table ===
| Pos | Team | Pld | W | D | L | GF | GA | GD | Pts | Qualification |
|---|---|---|---|---|---|---|---|---|---|---|
| 1 | Shandong Taishan (C) | 22 | 15 | 6 | 1 | 47 | 16 | +31 | 51 | Qualification for AFC Champions League group stage |
| 2 | Shanghai Port | 22 | 13 | 6 | 3 | 42 | 14 | +28 | 45 | Qualification for AFC Champions League group stage |
| 3 | Guangzhou | 22 | 13 | 5 | 4 | 47 | 17 | +30 | 44 | Qualification for AFC Champions League group stage |
| 4 | Changchun Yatai | 22 | 11 | 6 | 5 | 31 | 20 | +11 | 39 | |
| 5 | Beijing Guoan | 22 | 9 | 6 | 7 | 26 | 28 | −2 | 33 | |
| 6 | Shenzhen | 22 | 9 | 5 | 8 | 33 | 29 | +4 | 32 | |
| 7 | Guangzhou City | 22 | 7 | 8 | 7 | 32 | 31 | +1 | 29 | |
| 8 | Hebei | 22 | 6 | 7 | 9 | 15 | 28 | −13 | 25 | |

Source: Soccerway
Rules for classification:
- During season: 1) Points; 2) Goal difference; 3) Goals scored.
- After season: 1) Points; 2) Head-to-head points; 3) Head-to-head goal difference; 4) Head-to-head goals scored; 5) Scores of the weight ratio of the reserve league and youth leagues.
  (C) Champions

=== Results ===
| Home \ Away | BJG | CCY | GZH | GZC | HEB | SDT | SHP | SZH |
|---|---|---|---|---|---|---|---|---|
| Beijing Guoan | | | 1–0 | 1–1 | | 1–1 | | 2–2 |
| Changchun Yatai | | | 0–2 | 2–1 | | 1–1 | | 1–1 |
| Guangzhou | 1–0 | 2–0 | | | 1–1 | | 0–0 | |
| Guangzhou City | 5–0 | 0–2 | | | 2–1 | | 1–2 | |
| Hebei | | | 0–2 | 1–1 | | 0–5 | | 0–1 |
| Shandong Taishan | 2–1 | 2–1 | | | 2–0 | | 2–2 | |
| Shanghai Port | | | 1–0 | 1–0 | | 0–2 | | 3–1 |
| Shenzhen | 0–1 | 0–1 | | | 3–0 | | 1–3 | |

Source: Soccerway
Legend: Blue = home team win; Yellow = draw; Red = away team win.
For upcoming matches, an "a" indicates there is an article about the rivalry between the two participants.

=== Positions by round ===
To preserve chronological evolvements, any postponed matches are not included to the round at which they were originally scheduled, but added to the full round they were played immediately afterwards. For example, if a match is scheduled for round 7, but then played between rounds 8 and 9, it will be added to the standings for round 8.

| Team ╲ Round | 15 | 16 | 17 | 18 | 19 | 20 | 21 | 22 |
|---|---|---|---|---|---|---|---|---|
| Shandong Taishan | 1 | 1 | 1 | 1 | 1 | 1 | 1 | 1 |
| Shanghai Port | 2 | 2 | 3 | 3 | 3 | 3 | 3 | 2 |
| Guangzhou | 4 | 4 | 2 | 2 | 2 | 2 | 2 | 3 |
| Changchun Yatai | 3 | 3 | 4 | 4 | 4 | 4 | 4 | 4 |
| Beijing Guoan | 5 | 5 | 6 | 6 | 6 | 6 | 6 | 5 |
| Shenzhen | 6 | 6 | 5 | 5 | 5 | 5 | 5 | 6 |
| Guangzhou City | 8 | 8 | 7 | 7 | 7 | 7 | 7 | 7 |
| Hebei | 7 | 7 | 8 | 8 | 8 | 8 | 8 | 8 |

| Leader and qualification to AFC Champions League group stage |
| Qualification to AFC Champions League Group stage |
| Qualification to AFC Champions League play-off round |

Source: Soccerway

=== Results by match played ===
| Team ╲ Round | 15 | 16 | 17 | 18 | 19 | 20 | 21 | 22 |
|---|---|---|---|---|---|---|---|---|
| Beijing Guoan | W | L | L | D | L | D | D | W |
| Changchun Yatai | W | D | L | L | W | W | L | D |
| Guangzhou | L | D | W | D | W | W | W | L |
| Guangzhou City | L | L | W | D | L | L | D | W |
| Hebei | L | D | L | D | L | L | L | L |
| Shandong Taishan | W | W | W | W | W | D | D | D |
| Shanghai Port | W | W | L | D | W | W | D | W |
| Shenzhen | L | D | W | D | L | L | W | L |

Source: Soccerway
W = Win; D = Draw; L = Loss

== Relegation stage ==
=== League table ===
| Pos | Team | Pld | W | D | L | GF | GA | GD | Pts | Qualification or relegation |
|---|---|---|---|---|---|---|---|---|---|---|
| 9 | Shanghai Shenhua | 22 | 10 | 7 | 5 | 34 | 22 | +12 | 37 | |
| 10 | Henan Songshan Longmen | 22 | 7 | 9 | 6 | 19 | 20 | −1 | 30 | |
| 11 | Cangzhou Mighty Lions | 22 | 6 | 6 | 10 | 25 | 32 | −7 | 24 | |
| 12 | Tianjin Jinmen Tiger | 22 | 5 | 6 | 11 | 18 | 35 | −17 | 21 | |
| 13 | Chongqing Liangjiang Athletic (R, D) | 22 | 5 | 5 | 12 | 21 | 36 | −15 | 20 (Note: Chongqing Liangjiang Athletic finished ahead of Wuhan on head-to-head points: Chongqing Liangjiang Athletic 0–0 Wuhan, Wuhan 1–2 Chongqing Liangjiang Athletic.) | Dissolved after season |
| 14 | Wuhan | 22 | 3 | 11 | 8 | 23 | 30 | −7 | 20 | |
| 15 | Dalian Pro (T) | 22 | 6 | 1 | 15 | 21 | 37 | −16 | 19 | Qualification for relegation play-offs |
| 16 | Qingdao (R, D) | 22 | 3 | 2 | 17 | 13 | 52 | −39 | 11 | Dissolved after season |

Source: Soccerway
Rules for classification:
- During season: 1) Points; 2) Goal difference; 3) Goals scored.
- After season: 1) Points; 2) Head-to-head points; 3) Head-to-head goal difference; 4) Head-to-head goals scored; 5) Scores of the weight ratio of the reserve league and youth leagues.
  (D) Disqualified; (R) Relegated; (T) Qualified, but not yet for the particular phase indicated
  Notes:

=== Results ===
| Home \ Away | CZL | CQL | DLP | HSL | QDA | SHS | TJT | WUH |
|---|---|---|---|---|---|---|---|---|
| Cangzhou Mighty Lions | | | 2–0 | | | 1–1 | 2–1 | 2–0 |
| Chongqing Liangjiang Athletic | | | 0–1 | | | 0–0 | 0–1 | 0–0 |
| Dalian Pro | 1–2 | 0–1 | | 1–0 | 4–1 | | | |
| Henan Songshan Longmen | | | 1–0 | | | 2–0 | 1–1 | 1–0 |
| Qingdao | | | 1–2 | | | 0–1 | 0–1 | 2–5 |
| Shanghai Shenhua | 1–1 | 4–1 | | 3–0 | 3–0 | | | |
| Tianjin Jinmen Tiger | 1–0 | 1–1 | | 0–0 | 1–2 | | | |
| Wuhan | 4–2 | 1–2 | | 1–1 | 1–1 | | | |

Source: Soccerway
Legend: Blue = home team win; Yellow = draw; Red = away team win.
For upcoming matches, an "a" indicates there is an article about the rivalry between the two participants.

=== Positions by round ===
To preserve chronological evolvements, any postponed matches are not included to the round at which they were originally scheduled, but added to the full round they were played immediately afterwards. For example, if a match is scheduled for round 7, but then played between rounds 8 and 9, it will be added to the standings for round 8.

| Team ╲ Round | 15 | 16 | 17 | 18 | 19 | 20 | 21 | 22 |
|---|---|---|---|---|---|---|---|---|
| Shanghai Shenhua | 9 | 9 | 9 | 9 | 9 | 9 | 9 | 9 |
| Henan Songshan Longmen | 10 | 10 | 10 | 10 | 10 | 10 | 10 | 10 |
| Cangzhou Mighty Lions | 13 | 14 | 12 | 12 | 11 | 11 | 11 | 11 |
| Tianjin Jinmen Tiger | 15 | 15 | 15 | 15 | 14 | 15 | 13 | 12 |
| Chongqing Liangjiang Athletic | 12 | 13 | 14 | 14 | 15 | 13 | 14 | 13 |
| Wuhan | 11 | 11 | 11 | 11 | 12 | 12 | 12 | 14 |
| Dalian Pro | 14 | 12 | 13 | 13 | 13 | 14 | 15 | 15 |
| Qingdao | 16 | 16 | 16 | 16 | 16 | 16 | 16 | 16 |

| Qualification for relegation play-offs |

Source: Soccerway

=== Results by match played ===
| Team ╲ Round | 15 | 16 | 17 | 18 | 19 | 20 | 21 | 22 |
|---|---|---|---|---|---|---|---|---|
| Cangzhou Mighty Lions | L | D | W | W | W | D | W | L |
| Chongqing Liangjiang Athletic | D | L | L | D | L | W | D | W |
| Dalian Pro | W | W | L | W | L | L | L | W |
| Henan Songshan Longmen | L | D | D | W | W | D | W | L |
| Qingdao | L | L | W | L | L | D | L | L |
| Shanghai Shenhua | W | D | W | L | W | D | D | W |
| Tianjin Jinmen Tiger | D | D | L | L | W | D | W | W |
| Wuhan | W | W | D | D | L | D | L | L |

Source: Soccerway
W = Win; D = Draw; L = Loss

== Relegation play-offs ==
=== Overview ===
| Team 1 | Agg. | Team 2 | 1st leg | 2nd leg |
|---|---|---|---|---|
| Chengdu Rongcheng | 2–1 | Dalian Pro | 1–1 | 1–0 |
| Qingdao | 0–1 | Zhejiang | 0–1 | 0–0 |

=== Matches ===
8 January 2022
15:30 UTC+8

| Chengdu Rongcheng | 1–1 | Dalian Pro |
|---|---|---|
| Felipe 81' (pen.) | Report | Sun Guowen 42' |

Jiangyin Stadium, Suzhou
Attendance: 0 (Note: The match was played behind closed doors due to the COVID-19 pandemic.)
Referee: Li Haixin
12 January 2022
15:30 UTC+8

| Dalian Pro | 0–1 | Chengdu Rongcheng |
|---|---|---|
| | Report | Rômulo 72' |

Jiangyin Stadium, Suzhou
Attendance: 0
Referee: Wang Zhe

Chengdu Rongcheng won 2–1 on aggregate.

Chengdu Rongcheng were promoted to the Chinese Super League: Dailan Pro were to be directly relegated to the 2022 Chinese League One, but were repreived after Chongqing Liangjiang Athletic and Qingdao both folded.

8 January 2022
15:30 UTC+8

| Qingdao | 0–1 | Zhejiang |
|---|---|---|
| | Report | Andrijašević 30' |

Suzhou Olympic Sports Centre, Suzhou
Attendance: 0
Referee: Ma Li
12 January 2022
15:30 UTC+8

| Zhejiang | 0–0 | Qingdao |
|---|---|---|
| | Report |

Suzhou Olympic Sports Centre, Suzhou
Attendance: 0
Referee: Shi Zhenlu

Zhejiang won 1–0 on aggregate.

Zhejiang were promoted to the Chinese Super League: Qingdao were to be directly relegated to the 2022 Chinese League One, but Qingdao folded.

== Statistics ==
=== Top scorers ===
As of 4 January 2022

| Rank | Player | Club | Goals |
|---|---|---|---|
| 1 | (Brazil) Júnior Negrão | Changchun Yatai | 14 |
| 2 | (Brazil) Alan Kardec | Shenzhen | 11 |
| 2 | (China) Elkeson | Guangzhou | 11 |
| 4 | (Belgium) Marouane Fellaini | Shandong Taishan | 10 |
| 4 | (China) Guo Tianyu | Shandong Taishan | 10 |
| 4 | (China) Zhang Yuning | Beijing Guoan | 10 |
| 7 | (Brazil) Henrique Dourado | Henan Songshan Longmen | 8 |
| 8 | (Brazil) Anderson Lopes | Wuhan | 7 |
| 8 | (Brazil) Erik | Changchun Yatai | 7 |
| 8 | (Brazil) Ricardo Goulart | Guangzhou | 7 |
| 8 | (Brazil) Tiago Leonço | Guangzhou City | 7 |
| 8 | (China) Lü Wenjun | Shanghai Port | 7 |
| 8 | (Colombia) Jown Cardona | Guangzhou City | 7 |
| 8 | (Democratic Republic of the Congo) Oscar Maritu | Cangzhou Mighty Lions | 7 |

=== Top assists ===
As of 4 January 2022

| Rank | Player | Club | Assists |
|---|---|---|---|
| 1 | (Brazil) Oscar | Shanghai Port | 11 |
| 2 | (Colombia) Juan Fernando Quintero | Shenzhen | 7 |
| 3 | (China) Yan Dinghao | Guangzhou | 6 |
| 3 | (South Korea) Son Jun-ho | Shandong Taishan | 6 |
| 5 | (Brazil) Guilherme | Guangzhou City | 5 |
| 5 | (China) Alan | Guangzhou | 5 |
| 5 | (China) Deng Hanwen | Guangzhou | 5 |
| 5 | (China) Liu Binbin | Shandong Taishan | 5 |
| 9 | (Brazil) Paulinho | Hebei / Shanghai Port | 4 |
| 9 | (Cameroon) Christian Bassogog | Shanghai Shenhua | 4 |
| 9 | (China) Gao Tianyi | Beijing Guoan | 4 |
| 9 | (China) Huang Xiyang | Chongqing Liangjiang Athletic | 4 |
| 9 | (China) Qi Tianyu | Shandong Taishan | 4 |
| 9 | (China) Tan Long | Changchun Yatai | 4 |
| 9 | (China) Xie Pengfei | Cangzhou Mighty Lions | 4 |

=== Hat-tricks ===
| Player | Club | Against | Result | Date | Source |
|---|---|---|---|---|---|
| (Austria) Marko Arnautović | Shanghai Port | Tianjin Jinmen Tiger | 6–1 (A) | 22 April 2021 | |
| (Brazil) Ricardo Goulart | Guangzhou | Cangzhou Mighty Lions | 5–2 (H) | 2 August 2021 | |
| (China) Elkeson | Guangzhou | Qingdao | 5–0 (H) | 11 August 2021 | |

Notes

- (H) – Home team
- (A) – Away team

== Awards ==
=== Players of the Round ===
The following players were named the Players of the Round.

| Round | Player | Club | Reference |
|---|---|---|---|
| 1 | (Colombia) Giovanni Moreno | Shanghai Shenhua | |
| 2 | (Belgium) Marouane Fellaini | Shandong Taishan | |
| 3 | (China) Zhang Xizhe | Beijing Guoan | |
| 4 | (China) Tyias Browning | Guangzhou | |
| 5 | Vacant | Vacant | |
| 6 | (China) Zhao Mingjian | Shanghai Shenhua | |
| 7 | (China) Tan Long | Changchun Yatai | |
| 8 | (China) Zhang Yuning | Beijing Guoan | |
| 9 | (China) Yang Liyu | Guangzhou | |
| 10 | (China) Guo Tianyu | Shandong Taishan | |
| 11 | (China) Duan Liuyu | Shandong Taishan | |
| 12 | (Belgium) Marouane Fellaini | Shandong Taishan | |
| 13 | (China) Shi Yan | Tianjin Jinmen Tiger | |
| 14 | (China) Guo Tianyu | Shandong Taishan | |
| 15 | (Brazil) Oscar | Shanghai Port | |
| 16 | (South Korea) Son Jun-ho | Shandong Taishan | |
| 17 | (South Korea) Son Jun-ho | Shandong Taishan | |
| 18 | (Brazil) Henrique Dourado | Henan Songshan Longmen | |
| 19 | (Belgium) Marouane Fellaini | Shandong Taishan | |
| 20 | (China) Tan Kaiyuan | Guangzhou | |
| 21 | (China) Zheng Zhi | Guangzhou | |
| 22 | (China) Xie Weijun | Tianjin Jinmen Tiger | |

=== Annual awards ===
| Award | Winner | Club | Ref. |
|---|---|---|---|
| Chinese Super League Top Scorer | (Brazil) Júnior Negrão | Changchun Yatai F.C. | |

=== Chinese football awards ===
| Award | Winner | Club | Ref. |
|---|---|---|---|
| Chinese Golden Ball | (China) Wu Lei | RCD Espanyol | |
| Chinese Women's Golden Ball | (China) Wang Shuang | Wuhan Jianghan University | |
| Chinese Golden Boy | (China) Zhu Chenjie | Shanghai Shenhua F.C. | |
| Chinese Golden Coach | (China) Hao Wei | Shandong Taishan F.C. | |

Team of the Year
| Goalkeeper | (China) Han Jiaqi (Guangzhou City) | | | |
| Defenders | (China) Yu Hai (Shanghai Port) | | (China) Jiang Guangtai (Guangzhou) | (China) Zheng Zheng (Shandong Taishan) |
| Midfielders | (South Korea) Son Jun-ho (Shandong Taishan) | (Brazil) Oscar (Shanghai Port) | (Belgium) Marouane Fellaini (Shandong Taishan) | (China) Xu Xin (Shandong Taishan) |
| Forwards | (China) Zhang Yuning (Beijing Guoan) | | (China) Guo Tianyu (Shandong Taishan) | (Brazil) Júnior Negrão (Changchun Yatai) |

== League attendance ==
Attendance
| Round | Total | Matches opened to spectators | Avg. Per Game |
|---|---|---|---|
| Round 1 | 42,699 | 4 | 5,337 |
| Round 2 | 17,294 | 7 | 2,162 |
| Round 3 | 51,739 | 6 | 6,467 |
| Round 4 | | | |
| Round 5 | | | |
| Round 6 | | | |
| Round 7 | | | |
| Round 8 | | | |
| Round 9 | | | |
| Round 10 | | | |
| Round 11 | | | |
| Round 12 | | | |
| Round 13 | | | |
| Round 14 | | | |
| Round 15 | | | |
| Round 16 | | | |
| Round 17 | | | |
| Round 18 | | | |
| Round 19 | | | |
| Round 20 | | | |
| Round 21 | | | |
| Round 22 | | | |
| Total | 111,732 | 17 | 4,656 |
