= Shandong Province Youth Football Team =

Chinese football club

Shandong Province Youth Football Team (Simplified Chinese: 山东省青年足球队) is a Chinese football club based in Weifang. The club plays in the China League Two.

== History ==
This club founded in 2011, based on Shandong Luneng Taishan football school, Weifang. In the 2011 China League Two, this team placed 3rd in the North and played quarter-final in the play-off round, lost to Chongqing F.C.

== Results and Managers ==
Season	Division	Teams	Position	Play	Win	Draw	Lose	GF	GA	GD	Manager
2011	League Two	19	Quarter-final	16	10	1	5	32	16	+16	(China) Hu Yijun
2012	League Two	26	10th, North Group	24	6	4	14	32	43	−11	
