= 2017 Guangzhou Evergrande Taobao F.C. season =

Guangzhou Evergrande Taobao 2017
- Chairman: Li Yimeng
- Manager: Luiz Felipe Scolari
- Stadium: Tianhe Stadium
- Super League: 1st
- FA Cup: Semi-finals
- FA Super Cup: Champions
- AFC Champions League: Quarter-finals
- Top goalscorer: League: Ricardo Goulart (20 goals); All: Ricardo Goulart (27 goals)
- Highest home attendance: 49,736 vs Guizhou Zhicheng; 22 October 2017 (Super League)
- Lowest home attendance: 34,507 vs Hebei China Fortune; 21 June 2017 (FA Cup)
- Average home league attendance: league: 45,587 all: 43,688
Home colours	Away colours

The 2017 Guangzhou Evergrande Taobao season was the 64th year in Guangzhou Evergrande's existence and its 50th season in the Chinese football league, also its 28th season in the top flight. Guangzhou Evergrande won their seventh consecutive title of the league.

== Coaching staff ==
Position	Name
Head coach	(Brazil) Luiz Felipe Scolari
Assistant coaches	(Brazil) Paulo Turra (Brazil) Flávio Murtosa (China) Fu Bo (from 27 March 2017)
Goalkeeping coach	(Brazil) Carlos Pracidelli
Fitness coach	(Brazil) Darlan Schneider (Brazil) Rudy Pracidelli
Physiotherapist	(Brazil) Feliciano Fontoura
Team doctor	(Brazil) Gustavo Emilio Arcos Campos
Reserve team coach	(China) Chang Weiwei
Reserve team assistant coach	(China) Li Kun (China) Liu Zhiyu
Reserve team goalkeeping coach	(China) Wang Weiman
Reserve team Physiotherapist	(China) Wan Bingfeng
Academy director / U-17 team coach	(Germany) Marco Pezzaiuoli

== Transfers ==
=== In ===
==== Winter ====
Squad number	Position	Player	Age	Moving from	Type	Transfer fee	Date	Source
21	DF	(China) Zhang Chenglin	29	(China) Beijing Renhe	Transfer	Undisclosed	29 November 2016	
23	DF	(South Korea) Kim Hyung-il	32	(South Korea) Jeonbuk Hyundai Motors	Transfer	Free	24 December 2016	
	DF	(China) Yi Teng	26	(China) Beijing Renhe	Loan return		29 December 2016	
	DF	(China) Gong Liangxuan	23	(China) Sichuan Longfor	Loan return		1 January 2017	
	MF	(China) Hu Bowen	22	(China) Shenyang Urban	Loan return		1 January 2017	
	MF	(China) Li Yuanyi	23	(China) Tianjin Teda	Loan return		1 January 2017	
	FW	(China) Liang Xueming	21	(China) Guizhou Hengfeng Zhicheng	Loan return		1 January 2017	
	DF	(China) Liu Hao	20	(China) Guizhou Hengfeng Zhicheng	Loan return		1 January 2017	
51	GK	(China) Liu Weiguo	24	(China) Liaoning Whowin	Loan return		1 January 2017	
	MF	(China) Peng Xinli	25	(China) Chongqing Lifan	Loan return		1 January 2017	
	FW	(China) Shewket Yalqun	23	(China) Xinjiang Tianshan Leopard	Loan return		1 January 2017	
24	MF	(China) Wang Junhui	21	(China) Wuhan Zall	Loan return		1 January 2017	
42	MF	(China) Wang Rui	23	(China) Wuhan Zall	Loan return		1 January 2017	
	FW	(China) Yang Chaosheng	23	(China) Wuhan Zall	Loan return		1 January 2017	
	MF	(China) Zhang Jiaqi	25	(China) Qingdao Huanghai	Loan return		1 January 2017	
48	MF	(China) Zheng Jie	21	(China) Yunnan Lijiang	Loan return		1 January 2017	
26	FW	(China) Wang Jingbin	21	(Japan) Fagiano Okayama	Loan return		2 January 2017	

==== Summer ====
Squad number	Position	Player	Age	Moving from	Type	Transfer fee	Date	Source
	DF	(China) Yang Zhaohui	19	(Portugal) Vizela	Loan returned	–	30 June 2017	
30	FW	(Brazil) Muriqui	31	(Brazil) Vasco da Gama	Transfer	Free	12 July 2017	
34	MF	(China) Feng Boxuan	20	(Portugal) Torreense	Transfer	Undisclosed	14 July 2017	
36	FW	(China) Deng Yubiao	20	(Portugal) Oriental Dragon	Transfer	Undisclosed	14 July 2017	
	MF	(China) Wu Xiang	20	(Portugal) Oriental Dragon	Transfer	Undisclosed	14 July 2017	

=== Out ===
==== Winter ====
Squad number	Position	Player	Age	Moving to	Type	Transfer fee	Date	Source
	DF	(China) Yi Teng	26	(China) Guangzhou R&F	Transfer	Free (part of Liu Dianzuo's transfer deal)	29 December 2016	
	FW	(China) Shewket Yalqun	23	(China) Xinjiang Tianshan Leopard	Loan	Undisclosed	1 January 2017	
60	MF	(China) Zhang Jiaqi	25	(China) Shenzhen FC	Loan	Undisclosed	23 January 2017	
1	GK	(China) Dong Chunyu	25	(China) Beijing Enterprises	Transfer	Free	7 February 2017	
18	MF	(China) Li Yuanyi	23	(China) Tianjin Teda	Transfer	¥20 million	17 February 2017	
23	DF	(China) Han Pengfei	23	(China) Guizhou Hengfeng Zhicheng	Loan	Undisclosed	24 February 2017	
24	FW	(China) Liang Xueming	21	(China) Guizhou Hengfeng Zhicheng	Transfer	Undisclosed	24 February 2017	
44	DF	(China) Liu Hao	21	(China) Guizhou Hengfeng Zhicheng	Loan	Undisclosed	24 February 2017	
49	MF	(China) Tan Jiajun	23	(China) Meizhou Hakka	Transfer	Free	24 February 2017	
56	MF	(China) Guo Jing	20	(China) Meizhou Hakka	Loan	Undisclosed	24 February 2017	
	MF	(China) Peng Xinli	25	(China) Chongqing Dangdai Lifan	Transfer	Free	28 February 2017	
38	MF	(China) Ju Feng	22	(Japan) Ehime FC	Loan	Undisclosed	9 March 2017	
63	DF	(China) Liu Haidong	22	(China) Heilongjiang Lava Spring	Transfer	Undisclosed	13 March 2017	
	DF	(China) Gong Liangxuan	23	(China) Chengdu Qbao	Loan	Undisclosed	15 March 2017	
36	DF	(China) Hu Ruibao	20	(Denmark) Vejle Boldklub	Transfer	Free (in dispute)	22 March 2017	

==== Summer ====
Squad number	Position	Player	Age	Moving to	Type	Transfer fee	Date	Source
51	GK	(China) Liu Weiguo	25	(China) Yinchuan Helanshan	Loan	Free	23 June 2017	
23	DF	(South Korea) Kim Hyung-il	33	(South Korea) Bucheon FC 1995	Transfer	Free	29 June 2017	
40	GK	(China) Liu Shibo	20	(China) Nei Mongol Zhongyou	Loan	Free	14 July 2017	
8	MF	(Brazil) Paulinho	29	(Spain) FC Barcelona	Transfer	€40 million	14 August 2017	
	DF	(China) Imran Kurban	18	(Czech Republic) FK Mohelnice	Loan	Undisclosed	September 2017	

== Pre-season and friendlies ==
=== Training matches ===
Date	Opponents	H / A	Result	Scorers
2017-01-18	(Portugal) Real Massamá	N	3–1	Ricardo Goulart (2), Wen Jiabao
2017-01-24	(Portugal) Portimonense	N	4–3	Alan (32', 51'), Ricardo Goulart (25'), Zhang Wenzhao (68') / Ewerton (36', 39'), Fabrício (86')
2017-02-04	(Japan) JEF United Chiba	N	2–2	Paulinho (25'), Ricardo Goulart (31') / Machida (3'), Kiyotake (38')
2017-02-07	(Japan) Nagoya Grampus	N	6–1	Gao Lin, Paulinho, Alan, Zhang Wenzhao, Rong Hao, Liao Lisheng / Satō
2017-02-10	(South Korea) Jeonnam Dragons	N	2–0	Ricardo Goulart (44'), Alan (50')
2017-02-16	(China) Nei Mongol Zhongyou	H	5–3	Alan (2), Zhang Linpeng, Zhang Wenzhao, Yu Hanchao / Dorielton (2), Senghor
2017-03-25	(China) Meizhou Hakka	H	2–2	

=== Qiannan Cross-year Cup ===
31 December 2016 Semi-final	Guangzhou Evergrande Taobao	4–0	Yanbian Funde	Duyun
13:00 UTC+8	Gong Liangxuan 26'; Li Geng 51' (pen.); Ye Guochen 60', 65'			Stadium: Qiannan Nationwide Fitness Centre Stadium

2 January 2017 Final	Guangzhou Evergrande Taobao	0–0 (4–3 p)	Liaoning Whowin	Duyun
15:00 UTC+8				Stadium: Qiannan Nationwide Fitness Centre Stadium
	Penalties
	Li Geng (penalty missed); Li Zhongyi (penalty scored); Gong Liangxuan (penalty scored); Liu Haidong (penalty scored); Zhang Jiaqi (penalty scored)		(penalty scored) Ruan Zhexiang; (penalty scored) Chen Jingfan; (penalty scored) Zhou Sinan; (penalty missed) Chen Fubang; (penalty missed) Ma Haoran

== Competitions ==
Win Draw Loss

=== Chinese Super League ===
==== Table ====
Pos	Team	Pld	W	D	L	GF	GA	GD	Pts	Qualification or relegation
1	Guangzhou Evergrande Taobao (C)	30	20	4	6	69	42	+27	64	Qualification to Champions League group stage
2	Shanghai SIPG	30	17	7	6	72	39	+33	58	Qualification to Champions League play-off round
3	Tianjin Quanjian	30	15	9	6	46	33	+13	54	Qualification to Champions League play-off round
4	Hebei China Fortune	30	15	7	8	55	38	+17	52	
5	Guangzhou R&F	30	15	7	8	59	46	+13	52	

Source: League table
Rules for classification: 1) Points; 2) Head-to-head points; 3) Head-to-head goal difference; 4) Head-to-head goals scored; 5) Reserve league points; 6) Goal difference; 7) Goals scored; 8) Disciplinary points (1 point for each yellow card, 3 points for each red card); 9) Draw
(C) Champions

==== Results by round ====
Round	1	2	3	4	5	6	7	8	9	10	11	12	13	14	15	16	17	18	19	20	21	22	23	24	25	26	27	28	29	30
Ground	H	A	H	H	A	H	A	H	A	H	H	A	A	H	A	A	H	A	A	H	A	H	A	H	A	A	H	H	A	H
Result	W	L	W	D	W	W	W	W	W	W	W	W	W	W	L	L	W	D	L	W	W	W	W	W	D	D	W	W	L	L
Position	5	5	3	5	3	3	1	1	1	1	1	1	1	1	1	1	1	1	1	1	1	1	1	1	1	1	1	1	1	1

Updated to match(es) played on 4 November 2017. Source: Chinese Super League Table (in Chinese)
A = Away; H = Home; W = Win; D = Draw; L = Loss

==== Results summary ====
Overall								Home						Away					
Pld	W	D	L	GF	GA	GD	Pts	W	D	L	GF	GA	GD	W	D	L	GF	GA	GD
30	20	4	6	69	42	+27	64	13	1	1	38	18	+20	7	3	5	31	24	+7

Last updated: 4 November 2017.
Source: Competitive Matches

==== Matches ====
5 March 2017 1	Guangzhou Evergrande Taobao	2–1	Beijing Sinobo Guoan	Guangzhou
19:35 UTC+8	Wang Shangyuan (yellow card) 17'; Paulinho 19'; Zheng Zhi (yellow card) 27'; Huang Bowen (yellow card) 40'; Gao Lin (yellow card) 75'; Zheng Zhi (yellow card) 80' (yellow-red card); Alan (yellow card) 85'; Paulinho 87'; Feng Xiaoting (yellow card) 90+3'; Zheng Long (yellow card) 90+4'		Yu Yang (yellow card) 28'; Yilmaz 38' (pen.); Li Lei (yellow card) 51'; Yilmaz (yellow card) 58'; Zhao Hejing (red card) 67'; Jin Pengxiang (yellow card) 77'; Jiang Tao (yellow card) 90+4'	Stadium: Tianhe Stadium; Attendance: 47,998; Referee: He Xiaohu; Assistant referees: Shi Xiang, Ma Ji; Fourth official: Gu Chunhan

10 March 2017 2	Shandong Luneng Taishan	2–1	Guangzhou Evergrande Taobao	Jinan
19:35 UTC+8	Gil 55'; Li Songyi (yellow card) 59'; Tardelli 76'; Tardelli (yellow card) 89'		Huang Bowen 6'; Huang Bowen (yellow card) 38'; Feng Xiaoting (yellow card) 41'	Stadium: Jinan Olympic Sports Center Stadium; Attendance: 37,012; Referee: Zhao Zhizhi; Assistant referees: Cao Yi, Song Xiangyun; Fourth official: Wang Zhe

1 April 2017 3	Guangzhou Evergrande Taobao	3–2	Shanghai SIPG	Guangzhou
19:35 UTC+8	Yu Hanchao 12'; Mei Fang (yellow card) 18'; Alan 24'; Xu Xin (yellow card) 55'; Goulart 80' (pen.); Huang Bowen (yellow card) 86'		Elkeson 53'; Wang Shenchao (yellow card) 64'; Hulk 70'; Shi Ke (yellow card) 79'	Stadium: Tianhe Stadium; Attendance: 48,851; Referee: Fu Ming; Assistant referees: Liu Guiqing, Xu Xianghui; Fourth official: Wang Jing

8 April 2017 4	Guangzhou Evergrande Taobao	2–2	Guangzhou R&F	Guangzhou
19:35 UTC+8	Alan 9'; Mei Fang (yellow card) 20'; Zheng Zhi (yellow card) 62'; Huang Bowen (yellow card) 79'; Gao Lin 90+1'; Zhang Linpeng (yellow card) 90+3'		Zahavi 42' (pen.); Renaltinho 64'; Chen Zhizhao (yellow card) 72'	Stadium: Tianhe Stadium; Attendance: 47,811; Referee: Wang Di; Assistant referees: Ma Ji, Zhang Cheng; Fourth official: Shen Yinhao

16 April 2017 5	Tianjin Elion	0–3	Guangzhou Evergrande Taobao	Tianjin
19:35 UTC+8	Mirahmetjan (yellow card) 53'; Guo Hao (yellow card) 60'; Qiu Tianyi (yellow card) 77'; Bai Yuefeng (yellow card) 80'		Goulart 13' (pen.); Mei Fang (yellow card) 29'; Zeng Cheng (yellow card) 39'; Goulart 72'; Yu Hanchao 84'; Zheng Zhi (yellow card) 86'	Stadium: Tianjin Tuanbo Football Stadium; Attendance: 15,316; Referee: Guan Xing; Assistant referees: Liu Guiqing, Wu Huifeng; Fourth official: Fu Ming

21 April 2017 6	Guangzhou Evergrande Taobao	2–1	Liaoning Shenyang Kaixin	Guangzhou
19:35 UTC+8	Wang Shangyuan (yellow card) 66'; Wang Shangyuan (yellow card) 67' (yellow-red card); Zheng Zhi (yellow card) 71'; Gao Lin 74'; Goulart 81' (pen.); Goulart (yellow card) 83'; Gao Lin (yellow card) 85'; Zhang Linpeng (yellow card) 90+2'		Ni Yusong (yellow card) 40'; Lukimya 69' (pen.); Yang Yu (yellow card) after match	Stadium: Tianhe Stadium; Attendance: 35,693; Referee: Wang Jing; Assistant referees: Ma Ji, Lou Fangping; Fourth official: Ma Ning

29 April 2017 7	Henan Jianye	2–4	Guangzhou Evergrande Taobao	Zhengzhou
19:35 UTC+8	Gomes 17'; Dočkal (yellow card) 71'; Bassogog 90'		Goulart 11' (pen.); Gao Lin (yellow card) 37'; Goulart 39' (pen.); Zhang Linpeng 44'; Mei Fang (yellow card) 51'; Goulart 74'	Stadium: Hanghai Stadium; Attendance: 21,379; Referee: Zhang Lei; Assistant referees: Song Xiangyun, Jiang Bo; Fourth official: Kou Jianxun

5 May 2017 8	Guangzhou Evergrande Taobao	3–2	Shanghai Greenland Shenhua	Guangzhou
19:35 UTC+8	Paulinho 24'; Gao Lin (yellow card) 45+1'; Wang Shangyuan (yellow card) 45+3'; Li Jianbin 71' (o.g.); Feng Xiaoting (yellow card) 83'; Yu Hanchao 86'; Liu Jian (yellow card) 90+1'		Guarín 29'; Bai Jiajun (yellow card) 34'; Guarín (yellow card) 45+2'; Martins 45+5'; Wang Shouting (yellow card) 62'; Moreno (yellow card) 69'; Moreno (yellow card) 90+2' (yellow-red card)	Stadium: Tianhe Stadium; Attendance: 47,931; Referee: Guan Xing; Assistant referees: Ma Ji, Xu Xianghui; Fourth official: Zhao Zhizhi

14 May 2017 9	Changchun Yatai	0–1	Guangzhou Evergrande Taobao	Changchun
15:00 UTC+8	Li Guang (yellow card) 38'		Zhang Linpeng (yellow card) 49'; Zhang Linpeng 61'; Zheng Zhi (yellow card) 83'	Stadium: Development Area Stadium; Attendance: 21,560; Referee: Fu Ming; Assistant referees: Wu Huifeng, Yang Yang; Fourth official: Luo Haitao

19 May 2017 10	Guangzhou Evergrande Taobao	2–1	Jiangsu Suningyi Purchase	Guangzhou
20:00 UTC+8	Alan 12'; Li Xuepeng (yellow card) 23'; Alan 42'; Paulinho (yellow card) 73'; Li Xuepeng (yellow card) 82' (yellow-red card); Gao Lin (yellow card) 85'; Zou Zheng (yellow card) 87'		Xie Pengfei 54'; Ramires (yellow card) 57'; Martínez (yellow card) 82'; Li Ang (yellow card) 85'	Stadium: Tianhe Stadium; Attendance: 47,191; Referee: Wang Zhe; Assistant referees: Huo Weiming, Xu Xianghui; Fourth official: Ma Li

26 May 2017 11	Guangzhou Evergrande Taobao	2–0	Chongqing Dangdai Lifan	Guangzhou
18:00 UTC+8	Yu Hanchao 35'; Goulart 81'		Sui Donglu (yellow card) 29'	Stadium: Tianhe Stadium; Attendance: 36,932; Referee: Zhang Long; Assistant referees: Sun Kai, Liu Jinyu; Fourth official: He Xiaohu

3 June 2017 12	Yanbian Funde	1–3	Guangzhou Evergrande Taobao	Yanji
15:30 UTC+8	Jin Chengjun (yellow card) 5'; Chi Zhongguo (yellow card) 27'; Yoon Bit-garam 43'		Xu Xin (yellow card) 17'; Liu Jian (yellow card) 24'; Paulinho 32'; Goulart (yellow card) 59'; Goulart 74'; Mei Fang (yellow card) 80'; Gao Lin 88'; Zheng Zhi (yellow card) 90+1'	Stadium: Yanji Nationwide Fitness Centre Stadium; Attendance: 23,113; Referee: Wang Di; Assistant referees: Zhang Cheng, Zhang Qiangjing; Fourth official: Shen Yinhao

17 June 2017 13	Guizhou Hengfeng Zhicheng	0–2	Guangzhou Evergrande Taobao	Guiyang
15:30 UTC+8	Jiang Liang (yellow card) 14'; Jelavić (penalty missed) 58' (pen.)		Gao Lin 43'; Zou Zheng (yellow card) 52'; Yu Hanchao (yellow card) 56'; Xu Xin (yellow card) 61'; Goulart 70'	Stadium: Guiyang Olympic Sports Center; Attendance: 41,783; Referee: Wang Zhe; Assistant referees: Huo Weiming, Xu Xianghui; Fourth official: Ai Kun

25 June 2017 14	Guangzhou Evergrande Taobao	2–0	Hebei China Fortune	Guangzhou
19:35 UTC+8	Zhang Linpeng (yellow card) 34'; Goulart 47'; Alan 54'; Mei Fang (yellow card) 74'; Zou Zheng (yellow card) 78'		Ren Hang (yellow card) 52'; Lavezzi (yellow card) 60'; Zhao Mingjian (yellow card) 78'; Ren Hang (yellow card) 88' (yellow-red card)	Stadium: Tianhe Stadium; Attendance: 47,713; Referee: Zhang Lei; Assistant referees: Song Xiangyun, Lou Fangping; Fourth official: Kou Jianxun

2 July 2017 15	Tianjin Quanjian	4–3	Guangzhou Evergrande Taobao	Tianjin
19:35 UTC+8	Sun Ke 46'; Kwon Kyung-won 51'; Pato (yellow card) 62'; Pato 68'; Zheng Dalun (yellow card) 74'; Wang Yongpo 81'		Yu Hanchao 38'; Paulinho 72'; Wang Shangyuan (yellow card) 73'; Zou Zheng (yellow card) 80'; Paulinho 90+2'	Stadium: Haihe Educational Football Stadium; Attendance: 25,378; Referee: Shi Zhenlu; Assistant referees: Wang Dexin, Cao Yi; Fourth official: He Xiaohu

8 July 2017 16	Beijing Sinobo Guoan	2–0	Guangzhou Evergrande Taobao	Beijing
19:35 UTC+8	Soriano 1'; Lei Tenglong (yellow card) 7'; Soriano 51'; Jin Pengxiang (yellow card) 68'; Ba Dun (yellow card) 72'			Stadium: Workers Stadium; Attendance: 54,018; Referee: Ma Ning; Assistant referees: Song Xiangyu, Zhang Qiangjing; Fourth official: Xia Jun

15 July 2017 17	Guangzhou Evergrande Taobao	2–1	Shandong Luneng Taishan	Guangzhou
19:35 UTC+8	Xu Xin (yellow card) 21'; Goulart 45'; Zou Zheng 81'		Pellè (yellow card) 42'; Jin Jingdao (yellow card) 52'; Pellè 61'	Stadium: Tianhe Stadium; Attendance: 48,619; Referee: Ma Li; Assistant referees: Huo Weiming, Liu Guiqing; Fourth official: Wang Zhe

22 July 2017 18	Shanghai SIPG	2–2	Guangzhou Evergrande Taobao	Shanghai
19:35 UTC+8	Elkeson (yellow card) 45'; Wu Lei 58'; Zhang Wei (yellow card) 68'; Wu Lei 85'		Alan 52'; Yu Hanchao 70'; Feng Xiaoting (yellow card) 89'; Zou Zheng (yellow card) 90+4'	Stadium: Shanghai Stadium; Attendance: 46,717; Referee: Huang Yejun; Assistant referees: Song Xiangyun, Xu Xianghui; Fourth official: Luo Haitao

29 July 2017 19	Guangzhou R&F	4–2	Guangzhou Evergrande Taobao	Guangzhou
19:35 UTC+8	Renaltinho (yellow card) 7'; Zahavi 38'; Urso (yellow card) 45'; Renaltinho 53'; Renaltinho 66'; Zahavi 85'; Jiang Jihong (yellow card) 90+2'		Huang Bowen (yellow card) 9'; Gao Lin (yellow card) 34'; Yu Hanchao (yellow card) 45'; Yu Hanchao 52'; Gao Lin 90'	Stadium: Yuexiushan Stadium; Attendance: 12,386; Referee: Guan Xing; Assistant referees: Huo Weiming, Zhou Fei; Fourth official: Wang Zhe

5 August 2017 20	Guangzhou Evergrande Taobao	3–0	Tianjin Elion	Guangzhou
19:35 UTC+8	Liu Jian (yellow card) 32'; Zhang Linpeng (yellow card) 45'; Gao Lin 81'; Li Xuepeng (yellow card) 87'; Goulart 90'; Zhang Wenzhao 90+4'		Hwang Seok-ho (yellow card) 88'	Stadium: Tianhe Stadium; Attendance: 45,639; Referee: Zhou Gang; Assistant referees: Ma Ji, Liu Jinyu; Fourth official: Gu Chunhan

10 August 2017 21	Liaoning Shenyang Kaixin	0–3	Guangzhou Evergrande Taobao	Shenyang
19:35 UTC+8	Yang Shuai (yellow card) 25'		Paulinho 33'; Goulart 70'; Li Xuepeng (yellow card) 81'; Goulart 85'	Stadium: Tiexi New District Sports Center; Attendance: 20,037; Referee: Ai Kun; Assistant referees: Huo Weiming, Zhang Hongwei; Fourth official: Chen Xin

13 August 2017 22	Guangzhou Evergrande Taobao	2–1	Henan Jianye	Guangzhou
19:35 UTC+8	Yu Hanchao (yellow card) 41'; Goulart 51'; Alan 86'; Zheng Zhi (yellow card) 90+3'		Luo Heng (yellow card) 40'; Dočkal 90+4'	Stadium: Tianhe Stadium; Attendance: 46,537; Referee: Fu Ming; Assistant referees: Liu Guiqing, Wu Huifeng; Fourth official: Li Pan

19 August 2017 23	Shanghai Greenland Shenhua	0–3	Guangzhou Evergrande Taobao	Shanghai
19:35 UTC+8			Xu Xin (yellow card) 11'; Gao Lin (yellow card) 27'; Muriqui 37'; Goulart (yellow card) 46'; Muriqui 47'; Li Xuepeng (yellow card) 61'; Goulart 84'; Alan (yellow card) 90+2'	Stadium: Hongkou Football Stadium; Attendance: 17,970; Referee: Ma Ning; Assistant referees: Wang Dexin, Shi Xiang; Fourth official: Xia Jun

8 September 2017 24	Guangzhou Evergrande Taobao	3–1	Changchun Yatai	Guangzhou
19:35 UTC+8	Goulart 26'; Goulart 59' (pen.); Alan 66'; Li Xuepeng (yellow card) 74'		Sun Jie (yellow card) 39'; Zhang Xiaofei (yellow card) 59'; Ismailov 62'	Stadium: Tianhe Stadium; Attendance: 38,942; Referee: Wang Zhe; Assistant referees: Xu Xianghui, Yi Xueyun; Fourth official: Liu Lin

17 September 2017 25	Jiangsu Suning	2–2	Guangzhou Evergrande Taobao	Nanjing
19:35 UTC+8	Yang Boyu 34'; Ramires (yellow card) 66'; Wang Song 87'		Goulart 11'; Muriqui (yellow card) 25'; Xu Xin (yellow card) 50'; Alan 75'; Zheng Zhi (yellow card) After match	Stadium: Nanjing Olympic Sports Centre; Attendance: 49,817; Referee: Ma Li; Assistant referees: Zhang Cheng, Zhou Fei; Fourth official: Zhao Zhizhi

22 September 2017 26	Chongqing Dangdai Lifan	2–2	Guangzhou Evergrande Taobao	Chongqing
19:35 UTC+8	Jung Woo-young 16'; Fernandinho 79'		Zhang Linpeng (yellow card) 25'; Gao Lin 28'; Li Xuepeng (yellow card) 31'; Gao Lin 60'; Xu Xin (yellow card) 84'	Stadium: Chongqing Olympic Sports Center; Attendance: 43,857; Referee: Gu Chunhan; Assistant referees: Cao Yi, Yu Yue; Fourth official: Wang Jing

13 October 2017 27	Guangzhou Evergrande Taobao	4–3	Yanbian Funde	Guangzhou
19:35 UTC+8	Liu Jian 14'; Han Guanghui 58' (o.g.); Muriqui 88'; Liu Jian 90+3'		Trawally 31'; Trawally 51'; Jiang Weipeng (yellow card) 86'; Trawally 90'	Stadium: Tianhe Stadium; Attendance: 45,672; Referee: Guan Xing; Assistant referees: Huo Weiming, Xu Xianghui; Fourth official: Liu Guiqing; Goal-line assistants: Shen Yinhao, Chen Xin

22 October 2017 28	Guangzhou Evergrande Taobao	5–1	Guizhou Hengfeng Zhicheng	Guangzhou
19:35 UTC+8	Gao Lin 15'; Alan 17'; Du Wei 52' (o.g.); Yu Hanchao 77'; Muriqui 90+2'		Wang Fan 29'; Du Wei (yellow card) 45+1'; Jiang Liang (yellow card) 72'	Stadium: Tianhe Stadium; Attendance: 49,736; Referee: Fu Ming; Assistant referees: Wu Huifeng, Yang Yang; Fourth official: Wang Zhe

29 October 2017 29	Hebei China Fortune	3–0	Guangzhou Evergrande Taobao	Qinhuangdao
15:00 UTC+8	Aloísio 25'; Ding Haifeng (yellow card) 48'; Lavezzi 77'; Aloísio 84'			Stadium: Qinhuangdao Olympic Sports Center Stadium; Attendance: 22,213; Referee: Viktor Kassai (Hungary); Assistant referees: György Ring (Hungary), Vencel Tóth (Hungary); Fourth official: Wang Jing

4 November 2017 30	Guangzhou Evergrande Taobao	1–2	Tianjin Quanjian	Guangzhou
15:00 UTC+8	Gao Lin (yellow card) 7'; Feng Xiaoting 64'; Zhang Chenglin (yellow card) 72'		Modeste 18'; Witsel (yellow card) 48'; Zhang Cheng (yellow card) 54'; Sun Ke 61'	Stadium: Tianhe Stadium; Attendance: 48,536; Referee: Muhammad Taqi Aljaafari Bin Jahari (Singapore); Assistant referees: Huo Weiming, Xu Xianghui; Fourth official: Shen Yinhao

=== Chinese FA Cup ===
2 May 2017 Third round	Meizhou Meixian Techand	1–2	Guangzhou Evergrande Taobao	Meizhou
19:00 UTC+8	Yang Chen 66'		Liao Lisheng 3'; Gao Lin 45'	Stadium: Meixian Tsang Hin-chi Stadium; Attendance: 14,680; Referee: Shen Yinhao; Assistant referees: Zhou Fei, Li Ruyi; Fourth official: Huang Xiang

21 June 2017 Fourth round	Guangzhou Evergrande Taobao	1–0	Hebei China Fortune	Guangzhou
20:00 UTC+8	Zheng Long 62'; Huang Bowen (yellow card) 78'		Zhao Yuhao (yellow card) 32'; Zhao Yuhao (yellow card) 33' (yellow-red card)	Stadium: Tianhe Stadium; Attendance: 34,507; Referee: Ma Li; Assistant referees: Liu Guiqing, Wu Huifeng; Fourth official: Zhang Long

19 July 2017 Fifth round–1st leg	Guangzhou R&F	4–2	Guangzhou Evergrande Taobao	Guangzhou
20:00 UTC+8	Renatinho 9'; Zahavi 45'; Zahavi 52' (pen.); Chen Zhizhao (yellow card) 62'; Renatinho 69'; Li Tixiang (yellow card) 90+2'		Zheng Zhi 27'; Liao Lisheng (yellow card) 38'; Alan 85'	Stadium: Yuexiushan Stadium; Attendance: 12,860; Referee: Fu Ming; Assistant referees: Xu Xianghui, Yang Yang; Fourth official: Wang Zhe

1 August 2017 Fifth round–2nd leg	Guangzhou Evergrande Taobao	7–2 (9–6 agg.)	Guangzhou R&F	Guangzhou
20:00 UTC+8	Kim Young-gwon (yellow card) 5'; Muriqui 14'; Alan 23' (pen.); Liu Jian (yellow card) 28'; Muriqui 36'; Feng Xiaoting (yellow card) 45+1'; Yu Hanchao 45+3'; Xu Xin (yellow card) 48'; Gao Lin 68'; Wang Shangyuan (yellow card) 70'; Zhang Chenglin (yellow card) 73'; Zhang Chenglin 75'; Alan 82'; Zhang Wenzhao (yellow card) 87'; Li Xuepeng (yellow card) 87'		Renatinho 7' (pen.); Jiang Zhipeng (yellow card) 18'; Júnior Urso (yellow card) 26'; Chen Zhizhao (yellow card) 40'; Chen Zhizhao (yellow card) 42' (yellow-red card); Lu Lin (yellow card) 60'; Zahavi 71' (pen.)	Stadium: Tianhe Stadium; Attendance: 42,579; Referee: Ma Ning; Assistant referees: Shi Xiang, Song Xiangyun; Fourth official: Jin Jingyuan

16 August 2017 Semifinals–1st leg	Shanghai SIPG	2–1	Guangzhou Evergrande Taobao	Shanghai
19:35 UTC+8	Shi Ke (yellow card) 11'; Wu Lei (yellow card) 47'; Ahmedov 55'; Cai Huikang (yellow card) 58'; He Guan 90+1'		Liu Jian 19'; Chen Zepeng (yellow card) 42'; Alan (yellow card) 52'; Gao Lin (yellow card) 73'	Stadium: Shanghai Stadium; Attendance: 25,503; Referee: Zhao Zhizhi; Assistant referees: Huo Weiming, Xu Xianghui; Fourth official: Ma Li

30 September 2017 Semifinals–2nd leg	Guangzhou Evergrande Taobao	1–4 (2–6 agg.)	Shanghai SIPG	Guangzhou
19:35 UTC+8	Gao Lin 10'; Liao Lisheng (yellow card) 20'; Liao Lisheng (yellow card) 39' (yellow-red card); Goulart (yellow card) 51'; Xu Xin (yellow card) 66'; Alan (yellow card) 80'; Kim Young-gwon (red card) 84'		Lü Wenjun (yellow card) 2'; Oscar (yellow card) 18'; Hulk 31'; Carvalho (yellow card) 37'; Wei Shihao 45+2'; He Guan (yellow card) 52'; Oscar 79'; Oscar 81'	Stadium: Tianhe Stadium; Attendance: 48,367; Referee: Ma Ning; Assistant referees: Shi Xiang, Sun Kai; Fourth official: Liu Jinyu

=== Chinese FA Super Cup ===
25 February 2017	Guangzhou Evergrande Taobao	1–0	Jiangsu Suningyi Purchase	Chongqing
20:00 UTC+8	Alan 35'; Wang Shangyuan (yellow card) 77'; Yu Hanchao (yellow card) 78'; Li Xuepeng (yellow card) 81'		Yang Xiaotian (yellow card) 39'; Teixeira (yellow card) 78'	Stadium: Chongqing Olympic Sports Center; Attendance: 49,560; Referee: Wang Di; Assistant referees: Wang Dexin, Ma Ji; Fourth official: Ai Kun

=== AFC Champions League ===
==== Group stage ====
Pos	Team	Pld	W	D	L	GF	GA	GD	Pts	Qualification
1	(Japan) Kawasaki Frontale	6	2	4	0	8	3	+5	10 (Note: Head-to-head results: Guangzhou Evergrande 1–1 Kawasaki Frontale, Kawasaki Frontale 0–0 Guangzhou Evergrande (Kawasaki Frontale won on away goals).)	Advance to knockout stage
2	(China) Guangzhou Evergrande	6	2	4	0	18	5	+13	10	Advance to knockout stage
3	(South Korea) Suwon Samsung Bluewings	6	2	3	1	11	6	+5	9	
4	(Hong Kong) Eastern	6	0	1	5	1	24	−23	1	

Source: AFC
Rules for classification: Group stage tiebreakers
Notes:

22 February 2017 1	Guangzhou Evergrande (China)	7–0	(Hong Kong) Eastern	Guangzhou, China
20:00 UTC+8	Goulart 4' (pen.); Wang Shangyuan 22'; Alan (penalty missed) 25' (pen.); Liao Lisheng 33'; Liao Lisheng 47'; Alan 65'; Paulinho 83'; Wang Shangyuan 85'	Report; Summary	Wong Tsz Ho (red card) 3'; Wong Chi Chung (yellow card) 25'; Wong Chi Chung (yellow card) 34' (yellow-red card)	Stadium: Tianhe Stadium; Attendance: 38,631; Referee: Chris Beath (Australia); Assistant referees: Matthew Cream (Australia), Paul Cetrangolo (Australia); Fourth official: Robert Evans (Australia)

1 March 2017 2	Suwon Samsung Bluewings (South Korea)	2–2	(China) Guangzhou Evergrande	Suwon, South Korea
19:00 UTC+9	Santos 15'; Yeom Ki-hun (yellow card) 22'; Johnathan 32'	Report; Summary	Goulart 25'; Alan (yellow card) 51'; Alan 81'	Stadium: Suwon World Cup Stadium; Attendance: 9,228; Referee: Fahad Al-Mirdasi (Saudi Arabia); Assistant referees: Abdulah Al-Shalwai (Saudi Arabia), Mohammed Maki A Al-Abakry (Saudi Arabia); Fourth official: Muhammad Nazmi Nasaruddin (Malaysia)

14 March 2017 3	Guangzhou Evergrande (China)	1–1	(Japan) Kawasaki Frontale	Guangzhou, China
20:00 UTC+8	Alan 26'	Report; Summary	Taniguchi (yellow card) 16'; Kobayashi 90+4' (pen.)	Stadium: Tianhe Stadium; Attendance: 38,532; Referee: Abdulrahman Al-Jassim (Qatar); Assistant referees: Taleb Salem Al-Marri (Qatar), Saoud Ahmed Almaqaleh (Qatar); Fourth official: Nivon Robesh Gamini (Sri Lanka)

12 April 2017 4	Kawasaki Frontale (Japan)	0–0	(China) Guangzhou Evergrande	Kawasaki, Japan
19:00 UTC+9		Report; Summary	Zhang Linpeng (yellow card) 8'; Li Xuepeng (yellow card) 90+3'	Stadium: Todoroki Athletics Stadium; Attendance: 13,481; Referee: Valentin Kovalenko (Uzbekistan); Assistant referees: Serazitdinov Ruslan (Uzbekistan), Andrey Tsapenko (Uzbekistan); Fourth official: Lim Bunthoeun (Cambodia)

25 April 2017 5	Eastern (Hong Kong)	0–6	(China) Guangzhou Evergrande	Hong Kong, China
20:00 UTC+8	Tsang Kam To (yellow card) 90+1'	Report; Summary	Paulinho 8'; Mitchell 40' (o.g.); Alan 50'; Alan 71'; Paulinho 82'; Yu Hanchao 90+2'	Stadium: Mong Kok Stadium; Attendance: 5,916; Referee: Rowan Arumughan (India); Assistant referees: Sapam Kennedy (India), Arun Pillai (India); Fourth official: Coimbatore Ramaswamy Srikrishna (India)

9 May 2017 6	Guangzhou Evergrande (China)	2–2	(South Korea) Suwon Samsung Bluewings	Guangzhou, China
18:30 UTC+8	Goulart 17'; Goulart 68'; Zheng Long (yellow card) 82'	Report; Summary	Yeom Ki-hun 9'; Lee Jong-sung (yellow card) 67'; Jurman (yellow card) 70'; Kim Jong-woo 79'; Kim Jong-woo (yellow card) 82'	Stadium: Tianhe Stadium; Attendance: 38,576; Referee: Ali Sabah (Iraq); Assistant referees: Ameer Dawood Hussein (Iraq), Hayder Abdulhasan Ali Ubaydee (Iraq); Fourth official: Ahmad A'Qashah Bin Ahmad Al'Badow (Singapore)

==== Knockout stage ====
===== Round of 16 =====
23 May 2017 First leg	Guangzhou Evergrande (China)	1–0	(Japan) Kashima Antlers	Guangzhou, China
20:00 UTC+8	Paulinho 75'; Zhang Linpeng (yellow card) 87'	Report; Summary	Kanazaki (yellow card) 90+3'	Stadium: Tianhe Stadium; Attendance: 39,863; Referee: Adham Mohammad Tumah Makhadmeh (Jordan); Assistant referees: Ahmad Moannes Nadi Alroalle (Jordan), Issa Mahmoud Ahmad Alamawi (Jordan); Fourth official: Mohammad Hasan Mahmoud Arafah (Jordan)

30 May 2017 Second leg	Kashima Antlers (Japan)	2–1	(China) Guangzhou Evergrande	Kashima, Japan
19:00 UTC+9	Pedro Junior (yellow card) 12'; Pedro Junior 28'; Yamamoto (yellow card) 79'; Kanazaki 90+1'	Report; Summary	Paulinho 55'; Zheng Long (yellow card) 81'; Li Xuepeng (yellow card) 90'	Stadium: Kashima Soccer Stadium; Attendance: 11,388; Referee: Ravshan Irmatov (Uzbekistan); Assistant referees: Abdukhamidullo Rasulov (Uzbekistan), Jakhongir Saidov (Uzbekistan); Fourth official: Suhaizi Shukri (Malaysia)

2–2 on aggregate. Guangzhou Evergrande won on away goals.

===== Quarter-finals =====
22 August 2017 First leg	Shanghai SIPG (China)	4–0	(China) Guangzhou Evergrande	Shanghai, China
20:00 UTC+8	Hulk 39' (pen.); He Guan (yellow card) 41'; Wang Shenchao 45+1'; Wu Lei 62'; Wu Lei 65'; Fu Huan (yellow card) 89'	Report	Wang Shangyuan (yellow card) 79'	Stadium: Shanghai Stadium; Attendance: 36,503; Referee: Nawaf Shukralla (Bahrain); Assistant referees: Yaser Tulefat (Bahrain), Ebrahim Saleh (Bahrain); Fourth official: Ruslan Serazitdinov (Uzbekistan); Goal-line assistants: Ali Abdulnabi (Bahrain), Ilgiz Tantashev (Uzbekistan)

12 September 2017 Second leg	Guangzhou Evergrande (China)	5–1 (a.e.t.) (4–5 p)	(China) Shanghai SIPG	Guangzhou, China
20:00 UTC+8	Alan 21'; Alan 35'; Zhang Linpeng (yellow card) 78'; Goulart 83'; Goulart 90+1'; Xu Xin (yellow card) 102'; Goulart 117' (pen.)	Report	Hulk (yellow card) 31'; Zhang Wei (yellow card) 45+3'; Wang Shenchao (yellow card) 50'; Wang Jiajie (yellow card) 89'; Wang Jiajie (yellow card) 97' (yellow-red card); Hulk 111'; Wang Shenchao (yellow card) 117' (yellow-red card); Yan Junling (yellow card) Penalty shoot-out	Stadium: Tianhe Stadium; Attendance: 39,972; Referee: Alireza Faghani (Iran); Assistant referees: Reza Sokhandan (Iran), Mohammad Reza Mansouri (Iran); Fourth official: Muayad Mohammed Ali (Iraq); Goal-line assistants: Mohanad Qasim Eesee Sarray (Iraq), Ali Sabah (Iraq)
	Penalties
	Goulart (penalty missed); Alan (penalty scored); Liao Lisheng (penalty scored); Muriqui (penalty scored); Zheng Zhi (penalty scored)		(penalty scored) Hulk; (penalty scored) Oscar; (penalty scored) Wu Lei; (penalty scored) Ahmedov; (penalty scored) Yu Hai

5–5 on aggregate. Guangzhou Evergrande lost on penalty shoot-out.

== Statistics ==
As of 4 November 2017

=== Appearances and goals ===
No.	Pos.	Player	Super League			FA Cup			Champions League			Super Cup			Total		
No.	Pos.	Player	Apps.	Starts	Goals	Apps.	Starts	Goals	Apps.	Starts	Goals	Apps.	Starts	Goals	Apps.	Starts	Goals
2	MF	(China) Liao Lisheng	16	9	0	6	6	1	7	3	2	1	1	0	30	19	3
3	DF	(China) Mei Fang	13	12	0	2	1	0	4	4	0	0	0	0	19	17	0
4	MF	(China) Xu Xin	14	14	0	5	5	0	1	1	0	0	0	0	20	20	0
5	DF	(China) Zhang Linpeng	22	22	2	1	1	0	10	10	0	1	1	0	34	34	2
6	DF	(China) Feng Xiaoting	24	24	1	2	2	0	10	10	0	1	1	0	37	37	1
7	FW	(Brazil) Alan Carvalho	27	20	10	5	5	3	10	10	7	1	1	1	43	36	21
8	MF	(Brazil) Paulinho	20	20	7	0	0	0	8	8	5	1	1	0	29	29	12
10	MF	(China) Zheng Zhi	17	17	0	1	1	1	10	10	0	1	1	0	29	29	1
11	MF	(Brazil) Ricardo Goulart	29	29	20	1	1	0	10	10	7	1	1	0	41	41	27
12	DF	(China) Wang Shangyuan	17	17	0	6	3	0	5	2	2	1	1	0	29	23	2
14	DF	(China) Rong Hao	4	0	0	1	1	0	0	0	0	0	0	0	5	1	0
15	MF	(China) Zhang Wenzhao	4	0	1	3	2	0	2	0	0	0	0	0	9	2	1
16	MF	(China) Huang Bowen	21	9	1	2	2	0	6	6	0	0	0	0	29	17	1
17	DF	(China) Liu Jian	17	12	2	6	6	1	3	2	0	0	0	0	26	20	3
19	GK	(China) Zeng Cheng	29	29	0	1	1	0	10	10	0	1	1	0	41	41	0
20	MF	(China) Yu Hanchao	30	11	8	5	5	1	10	3	1	1	0	0	46	19	10
21	DF	(China) Zhang Chenglin	6	0	0	5	4	1	1	0	0	1	0	0	13	4	1
25	DF	(China) Zou Zheng	15	12	1	2	1	0	4	3	0	0	0	0	21	16	1
26	FW	(China) Wang Jingbin	4	4	0	1	1	0	0	0	0	0	0	0	5	5	0
27	MF	(China) Zheng Long	18	6	0	2	1	1	6	1	0	1	0	0	27	8	1
28	DF	(South Korea) Kim Young-gwon	4	4	0	5	3	0	2	2	0	0	0	0	11	9	0
29	FW	(China) Gao Lin	29	26	9	4	2	3	10	8	0	1	1	0	44	37	12
30	FW	(Brazil) Muriqui	8	4	4	3	2	2	2	0	0	0	0	0	13	6	6
32	GK	(China) Liu Dianzuo	1	1	0	5	5	0	0	0	0	0	0	0	6	6	0
33	MF	(China) Cai Mingmin	0	0	0	1	0	0	0	0	0	0	0	0	1	0	0
34	MF	(China) Feng Boxuan	1	1	0	1	0	0	0	0	0	0	0	0	2	1	0
35	DF	(China) Li Xuepeng	17	16	0	3	2	0	8	7	0	1	1	0	29	26	0
37	DF	(China) Chen Zepeng	3	3	0	3	3	0	0	0	0	0	0	0	6	6	0
38	DF	(China) Wen Jiabao	8	8	0	1	0	0	0	0	0	0	0	0	9	8	0
58	FW	(China) Wang Jinze	0	0	0	1	0	0	0	0	0	0	0	0	1	0	0
TOTALS					66			14			24			1			105

=== Goalscorers ===
Rank	Player	No.	Pos.	Super League	FA Cup	Champions League	Super Cup	Total
1	(Brazil) Ricardo Goulart	11	MF	20	0	7	0	27
2	(Brazil) Alan Carvalho	7	FW	10	3	7	1	21
3	(Brazil) Paulinho	8	MF	7	0	5	0	12
3	(China) Gao Lin	29	FW	9	3	0	0	12
5	(China) Yu Hanchao	20	MF	8	1	1	0	10
6	(Brazil) Muriqui	30	FW	4	2	0	0	6
7	(China) Liao Lisheng	2	MF	0	1	2	0	3
7	(China) Liu Jian	17	DF	2	1	0	0	3
9	(China) Zhang Linpeng	5	DF	2	0	0	0	2
9	(China) Wang Shangyuan	12	DF	0	0	2	0	2
11	(China) Feng Xiaoting	6	DF	1	0	0	0	1
11	(China) Zheng Zhi	10	MF	0	1	0	0	1
11	(China) Zhang Wenzhao	15	MF	1	0	0	0	1
11	(China) Huang Bowen	16	MF	1	0	0	0	1
11	(China) Zhang Chenglin	21	DF	0	1	0	0	1
11	(China) Zou Zheng	25	DF	1	0	0	0	1
11	(China) Zheng Long	27	MF	0	1	0	0	1
Own goals				3	0	1	0	4
TOTALS				69	14	25	1	109

=== Assists ===
Rank	Player	No.	Pos.	Super League	FA Cup	Champions League	Super Cup	Total
1	(Brazil) Ricardo Goulart	11	MF	10	1	3	0	14
2	(China) Yu Hanchao	20	MF	8	1	0	0	9
3	(China) Gao Lin	29	FW	5	1	2	0	8
4	(Brazil) Alan Carvalho	7	FW	4	1	2	0	7
4	(China) Li Xuepeng	35	DF	3	2	2	0	7
6	(China) Liao Lisheng	2	MF	1	3	2	0	6
7	(China) Zheng Zhi	10	MF	4	0	0	1	5
8	(China) Zhang Linpeng	5	DF	2	0	2	0	4
8	(China) Zhang Wenzhao	15	MF	2	1	1	0	4
10	(China) Xu Xin	4	MF	2	1	0	0	3
10	(Brazil) Paulinho	8	MF	3	0	0	0	3
10	(China) Huang Bowen	16	MF	3	0	0	0	3
10	(China) Zheng Long	27	MF	2	0	1	0	3
14	(China) Liu Jian	17	DF	0	0	1	0	1
14	(Brazil) Muriqui	30	FW	0	1	0	0	1
TOTALS				49	12	16	1	78

=== Disciplinary record ===
No.	Pos.	Player	Super League			FA Cup			Champions League			Super Cup			Total		
No.	Pos.	Player	Yellow card	(yellow card) (yellow-red card)	Red card	Yellow card	(yellow card) (yellow-red card)	Red card	Yellow card	(yellow card) (yellow-red card)	Red card	Yellow card	(yellow card) (yellow-red card)	Red card	Yellow card	(yellow card) (yellow-red card)	Red card
2	MF	(China) Liao Lisheng	0	0	0	1	1	0	0	0	0	0	0	0	1	1	0
3	DF	(China) Mei Fang	6	0	0	0	0	0	0	0	0	0	0	0	6	0	0
4	MF	(China) Xu Xin	7	0	0	2	0	0	1	0	0	0	0	0	10	0	0
5	DF	(China) Zhang Linpeng	6	0	0	0	0	0	3	0	0	0	0	0	9	0	0
6	DF	(China) Feng Xiaoting	4	0	0	1	0	0	0	0	0	0	0	0	5	0	0
7	FW	(Brazil) Alan Carvalho	2	0	0	2	0	0	1	0	0	0	0	0	5	0	0
8	MF	(Brazil) Paulinho	1	0	0	0	0	0	0	0	0	0	0	0	1	0	0
10	MF	(China) Zheng Zhi	7	1	0	0	0	0	0	0	0	0	0	0	7	1	0
11	MF	(Brazil) Ricardo Goulart	3	0	0	1	0	0	0	0	0	0	0	0	4	0	0
12	DF	(China) Wang Shangyuan	3	1	0	1	0	0	1	0	0	1	0	0	6	1	0
15	MF	(China) Zhang Wenzhao	0	0	0	1	0	0	0	0	0	0	0	0	1	0	0
16	MF	(China) Huang Bowen	5	0	0	1	0	0	0	0	0	0	0	0	6	0	0
17	DF	(China) Liu Jian	3	0	0	1	0	0	0	0	0	0	0	0	4	0	0
19	GK	(China) Zeng Cheng	1	0	0	0	0	0	0	0	0	0	0	0	1	0	0
20	MF	(China) Yu Hanchao	3	0	0	0	0	0	0	0	0	1	0	0	4	0	0
21	DF	(China) Zhang Chenglin	1	0	0	1	0	0	0	0	0	0	0	0	2	0	0
25	DF	(China) Zou Zheng	5	0	0	0	0	0	0	0	0	0	0	0	5	0	0
27	MF	(China) Zheng Long	1	0	0	0	0	0	2	0	0	0	0	0	3	0	0
28	DF	(South Korea) Kim Young-gwon	0	0	0	1	0	1	0	0	0	0	0	0	1	0	1
29	FW	(China) Gao Lin	8	0	0	1	0	0	0	0	0	0	0	0	9	0	0
30	FW	(Brazil) Muriqui	1	0	0	0	0	0	0	0	0	0	0	0	1	0	0
35	DF	(China) Li Xuepeng	5	1	0	1	0	0	2	0	0	1	0	0	9	1	0
37	DF	(China) Chen Zepeng	0	0	0	1	0	0	0	0	0	0	0	0	1	0	0
TOTALS			72	3	0	16	1	1	9	0	0	3	0	0	100	4	1
