= 2016 Guangzhou Evergrande Taobao F.C. season =

Guangzhou Evergrande Taobao 2016
- Chairman: Ke Peng (to 1 February 2016); Liu Yongzhuo (5 February 2016 to 13 April 2016; Li Yimeng (from 13 April 2016)
- Manager: Luiz Felipe Scolari
- Stadium: Tianhe Stadium
- Super League: 1st
- FA Cup: Champions
- FA Super Cup: Champions
- AFC Champions League: Group stage
- Top goalscorer: League: Ricardo Goulart (19); All: Ricardo Goulart (28)
- Highest home attendance: 48,956 vs Yanbian Funde; 23 October 2016 (Super League)
- Lowest home attendance: 571 vs Pohang Steelers; 24 February 2016 (Champions League) (Note: Guangzhou Evergrande played their first group stage home match behind closed doors due to breaches of the AFC Champions League Regulations.)
- Average home league attendance: league: 44,883 all: 42,056
Home colours	Away colours

The 2016 Guangzhou Evergrande Taobao season was the 63rd year in Guangzhou Evergrande's existence and was its 49th season in the Chinese football league, also its 27th season in the top flight.

Guangzhou was knocked out in the group stage of 2016 AFC Champions League for the first time but won all three domestic titles for the second time in club's history. Brazilian attacking midfielder Ricardo Goulart won Chinese Football Association Footballer of the Year as well as the golden boot of the league by scoring 19 goals. Luiz Felipe Scolari won Manager of the Year title. Seven players including Feng Xiaoting, Gao Lin, Ricardo Goulart, Kim Young-Gwon, Paulinho, Zhang Linpeng and Zeng Cheng was elected in the eleven-man squad of 2016 Chinese Super League Team of the Year.

== Transfers ==
=== In ===
==== Winter ====
Squad number	Position	Player	Age	Moving from	Type	Transfer fee	Date	Source
4	MF	(China) Xu Xin	21	(Spain) Atlético Madrid B	Transfer	€4.3 million	25 December 2015	
18	MF	(China) Li Yuanyi	22	(Portugal) Leixões	Loan returned	-	25 December 2015	
	MF	(China) Peng Xinli	24	(China) Chongqing Lifan	Loan returned	-	31 December 2015	
	FW	(China) Yang Chaosheng	22	(China) Liaoning Whowin	Loan returned	-	31 December 2015	
	DF	(China) Yi Teng	25	(China) Hangzhou Greentown	Loan returned	-	31 December 2015	
	MF	(China) Feng Renliang	27	(China) Beijing Renhe	Loan returned	-	31 December 2015	
55	DF	(China) Hu Bowen	21	(China) Qingdao Hainiu	Loan returned	-	31 December 2015	
	DF	(China) Zhang Hongnan	24	(China) Shenzhen FC	Loan returned	-	31 December 2015	
	FW	(China) Shewket Yalqun	22	(China) Xinjiang Tianshan Leopard	Loan returned	-	31 December 2015	
	MF	(Italy) Alessandro Diamanti	32	(England) Watford	Loan returned	-	13 January 2016	
23	DF	(China) Han Pengfei	22	(Portugal) Mafra	Transfer	Undisclosed	18 January 2016	
9	FW	(Colombia) Jackson Martínez	29	(Spain) Atlético Madrid	Transfer	€42 million	3 February 2016	
32	GK	(China) Liu Dianzuo	25	(China) Guangzhou R&F	Transfer	Undisclosed	12 February 2016	

==== Summer ====
Squad number	Position	Player	Age	Moving from	Type	Transfer fee	Date	Source
	MF	(Italy) Alessandro Diamanti	33	(Italy) Atalanta	Loan returned	-	1 July 2016	
15	MF	(China) Zhang Wenzhao	29	(China) Shandong Luneng Taishan	Transfer	Undisclosed	7 July 2016	
	MF	(China) Wang Junhui	21	(China) Shijiazhuang Ever Bright	Loan return	-	15 July 2016	
56	DF	(China) Guo Jing	19	(Portugal) Oriental Dragon	Transfer	Undisclosed	15 July 2016	

=== Out ===
==== Winter ====
Squad number	Position	Player	Age	Moving to	Type	Transfer fee	Date	Source
56	FW	(Brazil) Robinho	31	-	End of contract	-	31 December 2015	
	MF	(China) Feng Renliang	27	(China) Beijing Renhe	Transfer	Undisclosed	1 January 2016	
	DF	(China) Zhang Hongnan	24	(China) Shenzhen FC	Transfer	Free	1 January 2016	
	FW	(China) Shewket Yalqun	22	(China) Xinjiang Tianshan Leopard	Loan	Undisclosed	1 January 2016	
	MF	(Italy) Alessandro Diamanti	32	(Italy) Atalanta	Loan	Undisclosed	13 January 2016	
34	MF	(China) Wang Junhui	20	(China) Shijiazhuang Ever Bright	Loan	Free	16 January 2016	
22	GK	(China) Li Shuai	33	(China) Shanghai Greenland Shenhua	Transfer	Undisclosed	19 January 2016	
	DF	(China) Yi Teng	25	(China) Beijing Renhe	Loan	Undisclosed	20 January 2016	
21	MF	(China) Zhao Xuri	30	(China) Tianjin Quanjian	Transfer	Undisclosed	21 January 2016	
9	FW	(Brazil) Elkeson	26	(China) Shanghai SIPG	Transfer	¥132 million (€18.5 million)	21 January 2016	
	MF	(China) Peng Xinli	24	(China) Chongqing Lifan	Loan	Undisclosed	19 February 2016	
18	FW	(China) Dong Xuesheng	26	Hebei China Fortune	Transfer	Undisclosed	25 February 2016	
14	GK	(China) Liu Weiguo	23	(China) Liaoning Whowin	Loan	Free	26 February 2016	
	FW	(China) Yang Chaosheng	22	(China) Wuhan Zall	Loan	Undisclosed	26 February 2016	
49	MF	(China) Wang Rui	22	(China) Wuhan Zall	Loan	Undisclosed	26 February 2016	
8	MF	(Brazil) Renê Júnior	26	-	Released	-	March 2016	
41	DF	(China) Gong Liangxuan	22	(China) Sichuan Longfor	Loan	Undisclosed	March 2016	
	MF	(China) Zheng Jie	20	(China) Lijiang Jiayunhao	Loan	Undisclosed	March 2016	

==== Summer ====
Squad number	Position	Player	Age	Moving to	Type	Transfer fee	Date	Source
55	DF	(China) Hu Bowen	22	(China) Shenyang Urban	Loan	Free	21 June 2016	
24	FW	(China) Liang Xueming	20	(China) Guizhou Hengfeng Zhicheng	Loan	Free	29 June 2016	
44	DF	(China) Liu Hao	20	(China) Guizhou Hengfeng Zhicheng	Loan	Free	29 June 2016	
18	MF	(China) Li Yuanyi	22	(China) Tianjin Teda	Loan	Undisclosed	15 July 2016	
60	MF	(China) Zhang Jiaqi	24	(China) Qingdao Huanghai	Loan	Undisclosed	15 July 2016	
	MF	(China) Wang Junhui	21	(China) Wuhan Zall	Loan	Undisclosed	15 July 2016	
39	FW	(China) Wang Jingbin	21	(Japan) Fagiano Okayama	Loan	Undisclosed	29 July 2016	
	MF	(Italy) Alessandro Diamanti	33	(Italy) Palermo	Transfer	Free	29 August 2016	
46	DF	(China) Yang Zhaohui	18	(Portugal) Vizela	Loan	Free	September 2016	

== Coaching staff ==
Position	Name
Head coach	(Brazil) Luiz Felipe Scolari
Assistant coaches	(Brazil) Ivo Wortmann (Brazil) Flávio Murtosa (China) Hao Wei
Goalkeeping coach	(Brazil) Carlos Pracidelli
Fitness coach	(Brazil) Darlan Schneider (Brazil) Rudy Pracidelli
Physiotherapist	(Brazil) Feliciano Fontoura
Team doctor	(Brazil) Gustavo Emilio Arcos Campos
Reserve team coach	(China) Hao Wei
Reserve team assistant coach	(China) Chang Weiwei (China) Liu Zhiyu
Reserve team goalkeeping coach	(China) Wang Weiman
Reserve team Physiotherapist	(China) Wan Bingfeng
Academy director / U-17 team coach	(Germany) Marco Pezzaiuoli

== Pre-season and friendlies ==
=== Training matches ===
Date	Opponents	H / A	Result	Scorers
2016-02-06	(Hong Kong) South China	H	1–1	Zheng Long
2016-02-11	(United Arab Emirates) Al Shabab	A	4–1	Jackson Martínez, Alan (3)
2016-02-14	(Denmark) F.C. Copenhagen	N	1–3	Zheng Long
2016-02-16	(United Arab Emirates) Al Urooba	N	Cancelled	
2016-10-08	(Hong Kong) Lee Man Rangers	H	4–0	Alan, Jackson Martínez, Ricardo Goulart

=== FC Schalke 04 China Tour ===
7 July 2016	Guangzhou Evergrande Taobao (China)	0 – 0 (5 - 4 p)	(Germany) Schalke 04	Foshan
19:35 UTC+8	Zhang Jiaqi (yellow card) 42'		Tekpetey (yellow card) 80'	Stadium: Century Lotus Stadium; Referee: He Xiaohu; Assistant referees: Ma Ji, Ye Zhi; Fourth official: Jia Zhiliang
	Penalties
	Liu Dianzuo (penalty scored); Ju Feng (penalty scored); Han Pengfei (penalty scored); Chen Zepeng (penalty scored); Hu Ruibao (penalty scored)		(penalty scored) Naldo; (penalty scored) Geis; (penalty scored) Di Santo; (penalty scored) Riether; (penalty missed) Sam

== Competitions ==
Win Draw Loss

=== Chinese Super League ===
==== Table ====
Pos	Team	Pld	W	D	L	GF	GA	GD	Pts	Qualification or relegation
1	Guangzhou Evergrande Taobao (C)	30	19	7	4	62	19	+43	64	Qualification to Champions League group stage
2	Jiangsu Suning	30	17	6	7	53	33	+20	57	Qualification to Champions League group stage
3	Shanghai SIPG	30	14	10	6	56	32	+24	52	Qualification to Champions League play-off round
4	Shanghai Greenland Shenhua (Note: Shanghai Greenland Shenhua qualified for the 2017 AFC Champions League qualifying play-offs round as Guangzhou Evergrande Taobao and Jiangsu Suning are 2016 Chinese FA Cup finalists.)	30	12	12	6	46	31	+15	48	Qualification to Champions League play-off round
5	Beijing Guoan	30	11	10	9	34	26	+8	43	

Source: Sina Sports
Rules for classification: 1) Points; 2) Head-to-head points; 3) Head-to-head goal difference; 4) Head-to-head goals scored; 5) Reserve league points; 6) Goal difference; 7) Goals scored; 8) Disciplinary points (1 point for each yellow card, 3 points for each red card)
(C) Champions

==== Results summary ====
Overall								Home						Away					
Pld	W	D	L	GF	GA	GD	Pts	W	D	L	GF	GA	GD	W	D	L	GF	GA	GD
30	19	7	4	62	19	+43	64	10	5	0	31	7	+24	9	2	4	31	12	+19

Last updated: 30 October 2016.
Source: Competitive Matches

==== Results by round ====
Round	1	2	3	4	5	6	7	8	9	10	11	12	21	13	14	15	16	17	18	20	19	22	23	24	25	26	27	28	29	30
Ground	A	H	H	A	H	A	H	A	H	A	H	H	H	A	H	A	H	A	A	A	H	A	H	A	H	A	A	H	A	H
Result	L	W	W	W	W	W	W	W	W	W	D	D	W	D	W	W	W	W	L	W	D	L	D	W	W	D	W	D	L	W
Position	11	3	3	2	2	1	1	1	1	1	1	1	1	1	1	1	1	1	1	1	1	1	1	1	1	1	1	1	1	1

Updated to match(es) played on 30 October 2016. Source: Chinese Super League Table (in Chinese)
A = Away; H = Home; W = Win; D = Draw; L = Loss

==== Matches ====
6 March 2016 1	Chongqing Lifan	2 - 1	Guangzhou Evergrande Taobao	Chongqing
15:30 UTC+8	Fernandinho 32'; Deng Xiaofei (yellow card) 49'; Fernandinho 74'; Liu Yu (yellow card) 88'; Liu Yu (yellow card) 90' (yellow-red card)	Report	Feng Xiaoting (yellow card) 28'; Huang Bowen (yellow card) 36'; Martínez 52'; Zhang Linpeng (yellow card) 66'	Stadium: Chongqing Olympic Sports Center; Attendance: 48,855; Referee: Wang Di; Assistant referees: Zhou Fei, Deng Bo; Fourth official: Chen Gang

12 March 2016 2	Guangzhou Evergrande Taobao	3 - 0	Changchun Yatai	Guangzhou
19:35 UTC+8	Martínez 7'; Goulart 13'; Zheng Zhi (yellow card) 18'; Gao Lin 51'; Huang Bowen (yellow card) 67'	Report	He Chao (yellow card) 42'	Stadium: Tianhe Stadium; Attendance: 45,931; Referee: He Xiaohu; Assistant referees: Huo Weiming, Song Xiangyun; Fourth official: Zhang Lei

1 April 2016 3	Guangzhou Evergrande Taobao	2 - 0	Guangzhou R&F	Guangzhou
19:35 UTC+8	Paulinho 30'; Xu Xin (yellow card) 74'; Martínez 80'; Rong Hao (yellow card) 85'	Report	Giannou (yellow card) 90'	Stadium: Tianhe Stadium; Attendance: 46,993; Referee: Tan Hai; Assistant referees: Tong Yong, Lou Fangping; Fourth official: Huang Yejun

9 April 2016 4	Beijing Guoan LeEco	0 - 3	Guangzhou Evergrande Taobao	Beijing
19:35 UTC+8	Krimets (yellow card) 30'	Report	Huang Bowen (yellow card) 15'; Gao Lin 26'; Zheng Zhi (yellow card) 36'; Zhang Linpeng (yellow card) 39'; Goulart 44'; Goulart 81'	Stadium: Workers Stadium; Attendance: 53,080; Referee: Wang Di; Assistant referees: Zhou Fei, Zhang Qiangjing; Fourth official: Lin Jun

15 April 2016 5	Guangzhou Evergrande Taobao	2 - 1	Henan Jianye	Guangzhou
19:35 UTC+8	Kim Young-gwon (yellow card) 41'; Goulart 58' (pen.); Gao Lin 67'; Gao Lin (yellow card) 67'; Feng Xiaoting (yellow card) 74'; Paulinho (yellow card) 90'	Report	McGowan 18'; Gomes (yellow card) 58'; Sow (yellow card) 73'; Gu Cao (yellow card) 90+4'	Stadium: Tianhe Stadium; Attendance: 46,537; Referee: Ma Ning; Assistant referees: Zhou Guangya, Deng Bo; Fourth official: Fu Ming

24 April 2016 6	Tianjin Teda Elion	0 - 4	Guangzhou Evergrande Taobao	Tianjin
19:35 UTC+8	Li Benjian (yellow card) 23'; Bai Yuefeng (yellow card) 24'	Report	Yu Hanchao 7'; Gao Lin 30'; Gao Lin 66'; Alan 73'	Stadium: Tianjin Olympic Centre Stadium; Attendance: 20,860; Referee: Fan Qi; Assistant referees: Xu Xianghui, Zhang Hongwei; Fourth official: Xing Qi

30 April 2016 7	Guangzhou Evergrande Taobao	2 - 1	Shanghai Greenland Shenhua	Guangzhou
19:35 UTC+8	Zheng Zhi (yellow card) 14'; Alan 40'; Huang Bowen (yellow card) 45+3'; Goulart (penalty missed) 54' (pen.); Alan 71'	Report	Guarín (yellow card) 45+3'; Qin Sheng (yellow card) 52'; Moreno (yellow card) 62'; Ba 69'	Stadium: Tianhe Stadium; Attendance: 48,396; Referee: Tan Hai; Assistant referees: Tong Yong, Lou Fangping; Fourth official: Zhang Long

8 May 2016 8	Hangzhou Greentown	1 - 2	Guangzhou Evergrande Taobao	Hangzhou
19:35 UTC+8	Cao Haiqing (yellow card) 30'; Cahill (yellow card) 74'; Cahill 76' (pen.); Ge Zhen (yellow card) 84'	Report	Alan 7'; Goulart 31'; Feng Xiaoting (yellow card) 36'; Alan (yellow card) 90+4'	Stadium: Huanglong Stadium; Attendance: 22,739; Referee: Wang Jing; Assistant referees: Zhou Fei, Xu Jun; Fourth official: Zhao Zhizhi

14 May 2016 9	Guangzhou Evergrande Taobao	2 - 0	Hebei China Fortune	Guangzhou
15:30 UTC+8	Yu Hanchao 44'; Alan 48'		Gao Zhunyi (yellow card) 18'; Liao Junjian (yellow card) 70'	Stadium: Tianhe Stadium; Attendance: 48,586; Referee: Wang Zhe; Assistant referees: Cao Yi, Sun Kai; Fourth official: Fan Qi

21 May 2016 10	Liaoning Shenyang Whowin	0 - 3	Guangzhou Evergrande Taobao	Shenyang
15:30 UTC+8			Zheng Zhi 17'; Alan 36'; Goulart 46'	Stadium: Shenyang Olympic Sports Center Stadium; Attendance: 32,478; Referee: Shi Zhenlu; Assistant referees: Xu Xianghui, Zhang Hongwei; Fourth official: Fu Ming

29 May 2016 11	Guangzhou Evergrande Taobao	1 - 1	Shanghai SIPG	Guangzhou
19:35 UTC+8	Zhang Linpeng (yellow card) 31'; Goulart 63'; Feng Xiaoting (yellow card) 84'		Yu Hai (yellow card) 42'; Kouassi (yellow card) 43'; Kouassi 70'	Stadium: Tianhe Stadium; Attendance: 47,635; Referee: Huang Yejun; Assistant referees: Huo Weiming, Liu Guiqing; Fourth official: Zhao Zhizhi

11 June 2016 12	Guangzhou Evergrande Taobao	0 - 0	Shijiazhuang Ever Bright	Guangzhou
19:35 UTC+8	Gao Lin (penalty missed) 6' (pen.); Zheng Zhi (yellow card) 14'; Rong Hao (yellow card) 40'; Mei Fang (yellow card) 67'		Cho Yong-hyung (yellow card) 5'; Xu Bo (yellow card) 30'; Maurício (yellow card) 55'	Stadium: Tianhe Stadium; Attendance: 30,765; Referee: Shen Yinhao; Assistant referees: Zhou Fei, Zhang Qiangjing; Fourth official: Chen Gang

14 June 2016 21	Guangzhou Evergrande Taobao	2 - 0	Tianjin Teda Elion	Guangzhou
19:35 UTC+8	Paulinho 24'; Goulart (yellow card) 48'; Goulart 53'; Zhang Linpeng (yellow card) 74'		Pan Ximing (yellow card) 74'; Cao Yang (yellow card) 77'; Guo Hao (yellow card) 83'; Yang Qipeng (yellow card) 90+3'	Stadium: Tianhe Stadium; Attendance: 38,249; Referee: Fu Ming; Assistant referees: Shi Xiang, Zhou Guangya; Fourth official: Gu Chunhan

18 June 2016 13	Yanbian Funde	1 - 1	Guangzhou Evergrande Taobao	Yanji
15:00 UTC+8	Trawally 18'; Petković (yellow card) 29'; Cui Min (yellow card) 61'; Yoon Bit-garam (yellow card) 68'; Pei Yuwen (yellow card) 79'		Wang Shangyuan (yellow card) 67'; Gao Lin (yellow card) 81'; Kim Young-gwon (yellow card) 84'; Yu Hanchao 88'	Stadium: Yanji Nationwide Fitness Centre Stadium; Attendance: 20,480; Referee: Wang Zhe; Assistant referees: Dong Yong, Xi Fei; Fourth official: Ai Kun

24 June 2016 14	Guangzhou Evergrande Taobao	2 - 0	Jiangsu Suningyi Purchase	Guangzhou
19:35 UTC+8	Goulart 24'; Alan 28'; Liu Jian (yellow card) 80'		Gu Wenxiang (yellow card) 90+3'	Stadium: Tianhe Stadium; Attendance: 48,631; Referee: Huang Yejun; Assistant referees: Liu Guiqing, Wu Huifeng; Fourth official: Lin Jun

3 July 2016 15	Shandong Luneng Taishan	0 - 2	Guangzhou Evergrande Taobao	Jinan
19:35 UTC+8	Dai Lin (yellow card) 7'; Zhang Chi (yellow card) 57'		Mei Fang (yellow card) 28'; Alan 33'; Paulinho 51'	Stadium: Jinan Olympic Sports Center Stadium; Attendance: 20,182; Referee: Zhou Gang; Assistant referees: Huo Weiming, Xu Xianghui; Fourth official: Zhao Zhizhi

10 July 2016 16	Guangzhou Evergrande Taobao	4 - 1	Chongqing Lifan	Guangzhou
19:35 UTC+8	Alan 5'; Goulart (yellow card) 25'; Gao Lin (yellow card) 43'; Goulart 45+1'; Paulinho 47'; Goulart 76'		Gigliotti 33'; Gigliotti (yellow card) 57'; Luo Qin (yellow card) 68'	Stadium: Tianhe Stadium; Attendance: 45,398; Referee: Chen Xin; Assistant referees: Xu Jun, Deng Bo; Fourth official: Chen Gang

17 July 2016 17	Changchun Yatai	1 - 2	Guangzhou Evergrande Taobao	Changchun
19:35 UTC+8	Li Guang (yellow card) 17'; Ismailov 29'; Fan Xiaodong (yellow card) 66'; Yan Feng (yellow card) 83'; Sealy (yellow card) 87'		Chen Zepeng (yellow card) 28'; Zheng Zhi (yellow card) 33'; Wang Shangyuan (yellow card) 47'; Zheng Long 81'; Zheng Long 84'	Stadium: Development Area Stadium; Attendance: 23,417; Referee: Wang Di; Assistant referees: Zhou Fei, Zhang Qiangjing; Fourth official: Shen Yinhao

20 July 2016 18	Guangzhou R&F	2 - 1	Guangzhou Evergrande Taobao	Guangzhou
19:35 UTC+8	Jang Hyun-soo 56'; Zahavi 79'; Lu Lin (yellow card) 83'		Goulart 33'; Wang Shangyuan (yellow card) 45+1'; Zhang Wenzhao (yellow card) 90+2'	Stadium: Yuexiushan Stadium; Attendance: 14,596; Referee: Ma Ning; Assistant referees: Shi Xiang, Zhou Guangya; Fourth official: Xia Jun

30 July 2016 20	Henan Jianye	1 - 2	Guangzhou Evergrande Taobao	Zhengzhou
19:35 UTC+8	Gu Cao (yellow card) 16'; Patiño (yellow card) 47'; Yin Hongbo (yellow card) 55'; Ivo 69' (pen.); Samardžić (yellow card) 86'		Zheng Zhi (yellow card) 35'; Paulinho 42'; Goulart 45'; Zheng Zhi (yellow card) 47' (yellow-red card); Zeng Cheng (yellow card) 69'	Stadium: Zhengzhou Hanghai Stadium; Attendance: 21,377; Referee: Wang Zhe; Assistant referees: Huo Weiming, Liu Guiqing; Fourth official: Fan Qi

9 August 2016 19	Guangzhou Evergrande Taobao	0 - 0	Beijing Guoan LeEco	Guangzhou
19:35 UTC+8	Li Xuepeng (yellow card) 66'		Zhang Xinxin (yellow card) 42'; Zhao Hejing (yellow card) 54'; Zhang Xizhe (yellow card) 60'; Xu Yunlong (yellow card) 83'	Stadium: Tianhe Stadium; Attendance: 47,695; Referee: Zhou Gang; Assistant referees: Ma Ji, Cao Yi; Fourth official: Gu Chunhan

13 August 2016 22	Shanghai Greenland Shenhua	2 - 1	Guangzhou Evergrande Taobao	Shanghai
19:35 UTC+8	Martins 5'; Xiong Fei (yellow card) 28'; Martins 42'; Kim Kee-hee (yellow card) 56'; Wang Yun (yellow card) 71'; Guarín (yellow card) 72'		Gao Lin 12'; Mei Fang (yellow card) 61'; Li Xuepeng (yellow card) 69'; Huang Bowen (yellow card) 71'; Zhang Wenzhao (yellow card) 78'	Stadium: Hongkou Football Stadium; Attendance: 21,327; Referee: Ma Ning; Assistant referees: Shi Xiang, Zhou Guangya; Fourth official: Fu Ming

20 August 2016 23	Guangzhou Evergrande Taobao	0 - 0	Hangzhou Greentown	Guangzhou
19:35 UTC+8	Zheng Zhi (yellow card) 27'; Kim Young-gwon (yellow card) 48'		Dong Yu (yellow card) 76'; Zou Dehai (yellow card) 82'	Stadium: Tianhe Stadium; Attendance: 43,956; Referee: Wang Jing; Assistant referees: Cao Yi, Xi Fei; Fourth official: Wang Di

10 September 2016 24	Hebei China Fortune	0 - 3	Guangzhou Evergrande Taobao	Qinhuangdao
19:35 UTC+8	Mbia (yellow card) 12'		Huang Bowen 19'; Paulinho (yellow card) 25'; Huang Bowen (yellow card) 42'; Alan 45'; Goulart 52'	Stadium: Qinhuangdao Olympic Sports Center Stadium; Attendance: 24,631; Referee: Chen Gang; Assistant referees: Zhang Qiangjing, Deng Bo; Fourth official: Shen Yinhao

18 September 2016 25	Guangzhou Evergrande Taobao	6 - 2	Liaoning Shenyang Whowin	Guangzhou
19:35 UTC+8	Goulart 6'; Paulinho 11'; Li Xuepeng (yellow card) 23'; Zheng Long 58'; Alan 63'; Zheng Zhi (yellow card) 82'; Zheng Long 90+2'; Martínez 90+3'		Ni Yusong (yellow card) 8'; Lukimya 24' (pen.); Thwaite (yellow card) 60'; Vidošić 66'; Ni Yusong (yellow card) 82' (yellow-red card)	Stadium: Tianhe Stadium; Attendance: 42,978; Referee: Wang Zhe; Assistant referees: Liu Guiqing, Wu Huifeng; Fourth official: Huang Yejun

24 September 2016 26	Shanghai SIPG	0 - 0	Guangzhou Evergrande Taobao	Shanghai
19:35 UTC+8	Hulk (yellow card) 45+1'; Wang Shenchao (yellow card) 64'		Goulart (penalty missed) 45+3' (pen.)	Stadium: Shanghai Stadium; Attendance: 37,500; Referee: Huang Yejun; Assistant referees: Huo Weiming, Wang Dexin; Fourth official: Guan Xing

15 October 2016 27	Shijiazhuang Ever Bright	0 - 6	Guangzhou Evergrande Taobao	Shijiazhuang
19:35 UTC+8	Matheus (yellow card) 40'; Xu Bo (yellow card) 45'		Goulart (yellow card) 11'; Alan 12'; Mei Fang (yellow card) 23'; Gao Lin 27'; Paulinho 29'; Zou Zheng (yellow card) 34'; Goulart 38'; Goulart 45+1' (pen.); Alan 60'	Stadium: Yutong International Sports Center; Attendance: 25,311; Referee: Tan Hai; Assistant referees: Song Xiangyun, Yang Li; Fourth official: Wang Jing

23 October 2016 28	Guangzhou Evergrande Taobao	1 - 1	Yanbian Funde	Guangzhou
19:35 UTC+8	Zheng Zhi (yellow card) 8'; Paulinho 45+1'; Zou Zheng (yellow card) 60'		Yoon Bit-garam 88'	Stadium: Tianhe Stadium; Attendance: 48,956; Referee: Zhou Gang; Assistant referees: Zhang Cheng, Xi Fei; Fourth official: Xing Qi

26 October 2016 29	Jiangsu Suningyi Purchase	2 - 0	Guangzhou Evergrande Taobao	Nanjing
19:35 UTC+8	Sainsbury (yellow card) 21'; Martínez (yellow card) 30'; Zhou Yun (yellow card) 40'; Teixeira (yellow card) 56'; Xie Pengfei 76'; Hong Jeong-ho 88'		Mei Fang (yellow card) 47'	Stadium: Nanjing Olympic Sports Centre; Attendance: 47,955; Referee: Huang Yejun; Assistant referees: Huo Weiming, Zhou Fei; Fourth official: Fan Qi

30 October 2016 30	Guangzhou Evergrande Taobao	4 - 0	Shandong Luneng Taishan	Guangzhou
19:35 UTC+8	Goulart 12'; Liao Lisheng 22'; Alan 51' (pen.); Goulart 66'; Zhang Wenzhao (yellow card) 68'		Song Long (yellow card) 50'	Stadium: Tianhe Stadium; Attendance: 42,537; Referee: Wang Di; Assistant referees: Zhou Fei, Zhang Cheng; Fourth official: Wang Jing

=== Chinese FA Cup ===
11 May 2016 Third round	Hohhot Zhongyou	0 - 2	Guangzhou Evergrande Taobao	Hohhot
20:00 UTC+8	Yin Lu (yellow card) 31'; Luo Hao (yellow card) 45'; Jiao Zhe (yellow card) 50'; Luo Hao (yellow card) 65' (yellow-red card)		Mei Fang (yellow card) 59'; Yu Hanchao 83'; Alan 90+2'	Stadium: Hohhot City Stadium; Attendance: 31,283; Referee: Ma Li; Assistant referees: Liu Guiqing, Wu Huifeng; Fourth official: Niu Minghui

28 June 2016 Fourth round	Tianjin Teda Elion	0 - 3	Guangzhou Evergrande Taobao	Tianjin
19:35 UTC+8	Liao Bochao (yellow card) 7'; Diagne (yellow card) 58'; Fan Baiqun (yellow card) 65'; Zhou Haibin (yellow card) 76'		Alan 36'; Liu Jian 40'; Alan 61'; Goulart (yellow card) 69'	Stadium: Tianjin Olympic Centre Stadium; Attendance: 10,056; Referee: Zhao Zhizhi; Assistant referees: Yu Yue, Xi Fei; Fourth official: Zhang Lei

13 July 2016 Quarter-finals	Guangzhou Evergrande Taobao	2 - 1	Beijing Guoan LeEco	Guangzhou
20:00 UTC+8	Gao Lin 9'; Gao Lin 39'; Goulart (yellow card) 42'; Gao Lin (penalty missed) 84' (pen.); Alan (yellow card) 86'; Zheng Zhi (yellow card) 86'; Gao Lin (yellow card) 89'		Mei Fang 27' (o.g.); Zhang Xinxin (yellow card) 82'; Lei Tenglong (yellow card) 89'	Stadium: Tianhe Stadium; Attendance: 44,612; Referee: He Xiaohu; Assistant referees: Shi Xiang, Song Xiangyun; Fourth official: Liu Lin

26 July 2016 Quarter-finals	Beijing Guoan LeEco	1 - 2 (2 - 4 agg.)	Guangzhou Evergrande Taobao	Beijing
19:35 UTC+8	Lei Tenglong (yellow card) 15'; Yu Dabao 23'; Yılmaz (yellow card) 32'; Xu Yunlong (yellow card) 55'		Feng Xiaoting (yellow card) 22'; Paulinho 34'; Gao Lin 46'; Huang Bowen (yellow card) 64'; Wang Shangyuan (yellow card) 87'	Stadium: Workers Stadium; Attendance: 41,663; Referee: Wang Di; Assistant referees: Tong Yong, Lou Fangping; Fourth official: Chen Gang

17 August 2016 Semi-finals	Guangzhou Evergrande Taobao	2 - 2	Guangzhou R&F	Guangzhou
19:35 UTC+8	Goulart 27'; Gao Lin (yellow card) 43'; Goulart 89'		Xiao Zhi 21'; Renatinho (yellow card) 38'; Zahavi 51'; Zahavi (yellow card) 51'	Stadium: Tianhe Stadium; Attendance: 33,849; Referee: Ai Kun; Assistant referees: Cao Yi, Ma Ji; Fourth official: Zhang Lei

21 September 2016 Semi-finals	Guangzhou R&F	1 - 3 (3 - 5 agg.)	Guangzhou Evergrande Taobao	Guangzhou
19:35 UTC+8	Tang Miao (yellow card) 67'; Zhang Yaokun (yellow card) 81'; Zahavi 85'		Paulinho 9'; Feng Xiaoting (yellow card) 58'; Goulart 67' (pen.); Alan 70'	Stadium: Yuexiushan Stadium; Attendance: 13,989; Referee: Zhao Zhizhi; Assistant referees: Song Xiangyun, Xu Xianghui; Fourth official: Fan Qi

20 November 2016 Final	Guangzhou Evergrande Taobao	1 - 1	Jiangsu Suningyi Purchase	Guangzhou
19:35 UTC+8	Goulart 9'; Li Xuepeng (yellow card) 15'; Huang Bowen (yellow card) 23'; Mei Fang (yellow card) 85'; Zou Zheng (yellow card) 90'		Wu Xi (yellow card) 19'; Zhang Xiaobin (yellow card) 57'; Martínez (yellow card) 60'; Teixeira 64'	Stadium: Tianhe Stadium; Attendance: 48,562; Referee: Huang Yejun; Assistant referees: Song Xiangyun, Zhang Qiangjing; Fourth official: Fan Qi

27 November 2016 Final	Jiangsu Suningyi Purchase	2 - 2 (3 - 3 agg.)	Guangzhou Evergrande Taobao	Nanjing
19:00 UTC+8	Martínez 7'; Zhou Yun (yellow card) 42'; Li Ang (yellow card) 63'; Martínez 73'; Yang Xiaotian (yellow card) 90+8'		Paulinho 45+2'; Zheng Zhi (yellow card) 57'; Huang Bowen 81'	Stadium: Nanjing Olympic Sports Centre; Attendance: 58,331; Referee: Jansen Foo (Singapore); Assistant referees: Lim Kok Heng (Singapore), Ronnie Koh Min Kiat (Singapore); Fourth official: Tan Hai

=== Chinese FA Super Cup ===
27 February 2016	Guangzhou Evergrande Taobao	2 - 0	Jiangsu Suningyi Purchase	Chongqing
19:35 UTC+8	Goulart 14'; Li Xuepeng (yellow card) 38'; Goulart 39'; Huang Bowen (yellow card) 74'		Ren Hang (yellow card) 27'; Teixeira (yellow card) 90'	Stadium: Chongqing Olympic Sports Center; Attendance: 50,380; Referee: Tan Hai; Assistant referees: Huo Weiming, Cao Yi; Fourth official: Fan Qi

=== AFC Champions League ===
==== Group stage ====
Pos	Team	Pld	W	D	L	GF	GA	GD	Pts	Qualification
1	(Australia) Sydney FC	6	3	1	2	4	4	0	10	Advance to knockout stage
2	(Japan) Urawa Red Diamonds	6	2	3	1	6	4	+2	9	Advance to knockout stage
3	(China) Guangzhou Evergrande	6	2	2	2	6	5	+1	8	
4	(South Korea) Pohang Steelers	6	1	2	3	2	5	−3	5	

Source: AFC
Rules for classification: Group stage tiebreakers

24 February 2016	Guangzhou Evergrande (China)	0 - 0	(South Korea) Pohang Steelers	Guangzhou, China
19:30 UTC+8		Report; Summary		Stadium: Tianhe Stadium; Attendance: 571; Referee: Mohanad Qasim Eesee Sarray (Iraq); Assistant referees: Ameer Dawood Hussein (Iraq), Abdullah Mubarak Mohamed Al Shammakhi (Oman); Fourth official: Md Mizanur Rahman (Bangladesh)

2 March 2016	Sydney FC (Australia)	2 - 1	(China) Guangzhou Evergrande	Sydney, Australia
20:00 UTC+11	Stambolziev 18'; Ryall (yellow card) 21'; Dimitrijević 89'; Smeltz (yellow card) 90+2'	Report; Summary	Goulart (penalty missed) 22' (pen.); Calver 25' (o.g.); Paulinho (yellow card) 76'	Stadium: Sydney Football Stadium; Attendance: 18,149; Referee: Alireza Faghani (Iran); Assistant referees: Reza Sokhandan (Iran), Mohammad Reza Mansouri (Iran); Fourth official: Farhad Bin Mohamed (Singapore)

16 March 2016	Guangzhou Evergrande (China)	2 - 2	(Japan) Urawa Red Diamonds	Guangzhou, China
19:30 UTC+8	Goulart 6' (pen.); Goulart 14'; Zheng Zhi (yellow card) 84'	Report; Summary	Ljubijankić (yellow card) 5'; Muto 30'; Moriwaki (yellow card) 75'; Koroki 89'	Stadium: Tianhe Stadium; Attendance: 48,816; Referee: Mohammed Abdulla Hassan Mohamed (United Arab Emirates); Assistant referees: Mohamed Alhammadi (United Arab Emirates), Hassan Almahri(United Arab Emirates); Fourth official: Chen Hsin-chuan (Chinese Taipei)

5 April 2016	Urawa Red Diamonds (Japan)	1 - 0	(China) Guangzhou Evergrande	Saitama, Japan
19:30 UTC+9	Moriwaki (yellow card) 42'; Muto 52'	Report; Summary	Martínez (yellow card) 31'; Zhang Linpeng (yellow card) 38'; Zheng Zhi (yellow card) 44'	Stadium: Saitama Stadium 2002; Attendance: 30,282; Referee: Abdulrahman Al-Jassim (Qatar); Assistant referees: Taleb Salem Al-Marri (Qatar)，Saoud Ahmed AlMaqaleh (Qatar); Fourth official: Alongkorn Feemuechang (Thailand)

19 April 2016	Pohang Steelers (South Korea)	0 - 2	(China) Guangzhou Evergrande	Pohang, South Korea
19:30 UTC+9	Kim Jun-su (yellow card) 50'	Report; Summary	Goulart 33'; Gao Lin 47'; Paulinho (yellow card) 50'; Feng Xiaoting (yellow card) 90+2'	Stadium: Pohang Steel Yard; Attendance: 9,274; Referee: Ilgiz Tantashev (Uzbekistan); Assistant referees: Mamur Saidkasimov (Uzbekistan), Ruslan Serazitdinov (Uzbekistan); Fourth official: Sherzod Kasimov (Uzbekistan)

3 May 2016	Guangzhou Evergrande (China)	1 - 0	(Australia) Sydney FC	Guangzhou, China
18:30 UTC+8	Gao Lin 2'; Li Xuepeng (yellow card) 58'; Xu Xin (yellow card) 77'	Report; Summary	Calver (yellow card) 51'	Stadium: Tianhe Stadium; Attendance: 33,517; Referee: Nawaf Shukralla (Bahrain); Assistant referees: Yaser Tulefat (Bahrain), Ebrahim Saleh (Bahrain); Fourth official: Ammar Ebrahim Hasan Mahmood (Bahrain)

== Statistics ==
As of 27 November 2016

=== Appearances and goals ===
No.	Pos.	Player	Super League			FA Cup			Champions League			Super Cup			Total		
No.	Pos.	Player	Apps.	Starts	Goals	Apps.	Starts	Goals	Apps.	Starts	Goals	Apps.	Starts	Goals	Apps.	Starts	Goals
2	MF	(China) Liao Lisheng	15	3	1	6	3	0	1	0	0	0	0	0	22	6	1
3	DF	(China) Mei Fang	25	22	0	7	7	0	2	2	0	0	0	0	34	31	0
4	MF	(China) Xu Xin	5	0	0	1	1	0	3	2	0	0	0	0	9	3	0
5	DF	(China) Zhang Linpeng	16	16	0	7	7	0	3	3	0	1	1	0	27	27	0
6	DF	(China) Feng Xiaoting	22	22	0	5	4	0	5	5	0	1	1	0	33	32	0
7	FW	(Brazil) Alan Carvalho	27	24	14	8	6	4	0	0	0	0	0	0	35	30	18
8	MF	(Brazil) Paulinho	30	30	8	8	7	3	5	5	0	1	1	0	44	43	11
9	FW	(Colombia) Jackson Martínez	10	6	4	1	0	0	4	4	0	1	1	0	16	11	4
10	MF	(China) Zheng Zhi	26	25	1	8	7	0	5	5	0	1	1	0	40	38	1
11	MF	(Brazil) Ricardo Goulart	29	29	19	7	7	4	6	6	3	1	1	2	43	43	28
12	MF	(China) Wang Shangyuan	23	14	0	5	3	0	3	3	0	0	0	0	31	20	0
15	MF	(China) Zhang Wenzhao	6	0	0	1	0	0	0	0	0	0	0	0	7	0	0
16	MF	(China) Huang Bowen	28	24	1	7	3	1	6	5	0	1	1	0	42	33	2
17	DF	(China) Liu Jian	7	3	0	2	2	1	4	1	0	1	0	0	14	6	1
18	MF	(China) Li Yuanyi	2	0	0	0	0	0	2	0	0	0	0	0	4	0	0
19	GK	(China) Zeng Cheng	23	23	0	5	5	0	5	5	0	1	1	0	34	34	0
20	MF	(China) Yu Hanchao	19	8	3	6	4	1	6	4	0	1	1	0	32	17	4
23	DF	(China) Han Pengfei	2	1	0	1	0	0	0	0	0	0	0	0	3	1	0
25	DF	(China) Zou Zheng	4	3	0	1	1	0	0	0	0	0	0	0	5	4	0
27	MF	(China) Zheng Long	19	4	4	6	4	0	4	2	0	1	0	0	30	10	4
28	DF	(South Korea) Kim Young-gwon	15	15	0	2	2	0	4	4	0	1	1	0	22	22	0
29	FW	(China) Gao Lin	28	27	7	7	6	3	6	2	2	0	0	0	41	35	12
31	MF	(China) Zhang Aokai	1	0	0	0	0	0	0	0	0	0	0	0	1	0	0
32	GK	(China) Liu Dianzuo	7	7	0	3	3	0	1	1	0	0	0	0	11	11	0
33	DF	(China) Rong Hao	12	11	0	1	1	0	4	3	0	0	0	0	17	15	0
35	DF	(China) Li Xuepeng	12	9	0	4	4	0	5	4	0	1	1	0	22	18	0
37	DF	(China) Chen Zepeng	6	4	0	3	1	0	0	0	0	0	0	0	9	5	0
TOTALS					62			17			5			2			86

=== Goalscorers ===
Rank	Player	No.	Pos.	Super League	FA Cup	Champions League	Super Cup	Total
1	(Brazil) Ricardo Goulart	11	MF	19	4	3	2	28
2	(Brazil) Alan Carvalho	7	FW	14	4	0	0	18
3	(China) Gao Lin	29	FW	7	3	2	0	12
4	(Brazil) Paulinho	8	MF	8	3	0	0	11
5	(Colombia) Jackson Martínez	9	FW	4	0	0	0	4
5	(China) Yu Hanchao	20	MF	3	1	0	0	4
5	(China) Zheng Long	27	FW	4	0	0	0	4
8	(China) Huang Bowen	16	MF	1	1	0	0	2
9	(China) Liao Lisheng	2	MF	1	0	0	0	1
9	(China) Zheng Zhi	10	MF	1	0	0	0	1
9	(China) Liu Jian	17	DF	0	1	0	0	1
Own goals				0	0	1	0	1
TOTALS				62	17	6	2	87

=== Assists ===
Rank	Player	No.	Pos.	Super League	FA Cup	Champions League	Super Cup	Total
1	(China) Gao Lin	29	FW	11	1	1	0	13
2	(Brazil) Alan Carvalho	7	FW	9	1	0	0	10
3	(Brazil) Ricardo Goulart	11	MF	6	3	0	0	9
4	(China) Huang Bowen	16	MF	5	1	0	2	8
5	(China) Zheng Zhi	10	MF	5	1	0	0	6
6	(China) Yu Hanchao	20	MF	2	3	0	0	5
6	(China) Rong Hao	33	DF	5	0	0	0	5
8	(Brazil) Paulinho	8	MF	3	0	0	0	3
9	(Colombia) Jackson Martínez	9	FW	1	0	1	0	2
9	(China) Zheng Long	27	MF	2	0	0	0	2
9	(China) Li Xuepeng	35	DF	0	1	1	0	2
12	(China) Liao Lisheng	2	MF	0	1	0	0	1
12	(China) Xu Xin	4	MF	0	0	1	0	1
12	(China) Liu Jian	17	DF	1	0	0	0	1
Total				50	12	4	2	68

=== Disciplinary record ===
No.	Pos.	Player	Super League			FA Cup			Champions League			Super Cup			Total		
No.	Pos.	Player	Yellow card	(yellow card) (yellow-red card)	Red card	Yellow card	(yellow card) (yellow-red card)	Red card	Yellow card	(yellow card) (yellow-red card)	Red card	Yellow card	(yellow card) (yellow-red card)	Red card	Yellow card	(yellow card) (yellow-red card)	Red card
3	DF	(China) Mei Fang	5	0	0	2	0	0	0	0	0	0	0	0	7	0	0
4	MF	(China) Xu Xin	1	0	0	0	0	0	1	0	0	0	0	0	2	0	0
5	DF	(China) Zhang Linpeng	4	0	0	0	0	0	1	0	0	0	0	0	5	0	0
6	DF	(China) Feng Xiaoting	4	0	0	2	0	0	1	0	0	0	0	0	7	0	0
7	FW	(Brazil) Alan Carvalho	1	0	0	1	0	0	0	0	0	0	0	0	2	0	0
8	MF	(Brazil) Paulinho	2	0	0	0	0	0	2	0	0	0	0	0	4	0	0
9	FW	(Colombia) Jackson Martínez	0	0	0	0	0	0	1	0	0	0	0	0	1	0	0
10	MF	(China) Zheng Zhi	8	1	0	2	0	0	2	0	0	0	0	0	12	1	0
11	MF	(Brazil) Ricardo Goulart	3	0	0	2	0	0	0	0	0	0	0	0	5	0	0
12	MF	(China) Wang Shangyuan	3	0	0	1	0	0	0	0	0	0	0	0	4	0	0
15	MF	(China) Zhang Wenzhao	3	0	0	0	0	0	0	0	0	0	0	0	3	0	0
16	MF	(China) Huang Bowen	6	0	0	2	0	0	0	0	0	1	0	0	9	0	0
17	DF	(China) Liu Jian	1	0	0	0	0	0	0	0	0	0	0	0	1	0	0
19	GK	(China) Zeng Cheng	1	0	0	0	0	0	0	0	0	0	0	0	1	0	0
25	DF	(China) Zou Zheng	2	0	0	1	0	0	0	0	0	0	0	0	3	0	0
28	DF	(South Korea) Kim Young-gwon	3	0	0	0	0	0	0	0	0	0	0	0	3	0	0
29	FW	(China) Gao Lin	3	0	0	2	0	0	0	0	0	0	0	0	5	0	0
33	DF	(China) Rong Hao	2	0	0	0	0	0	0	0	0	0	0	0	2	0	0
35	DF	(China) Li Xuepeng	3	0	0	1	0	0	1	0	0	1	0	0	6	0	0
37	DF	(China) Chen Zepeng	1	0	0	0	0	0	0	0	0	0	0	0	1	0	0
TOTALS			56	1	0	16	0	0	9	0	0	2	0	0	83	1	0
