= Alan (footballer, born 1989) =

Brazilian-born Chinese footballer (born 1989)

Alan A Lan
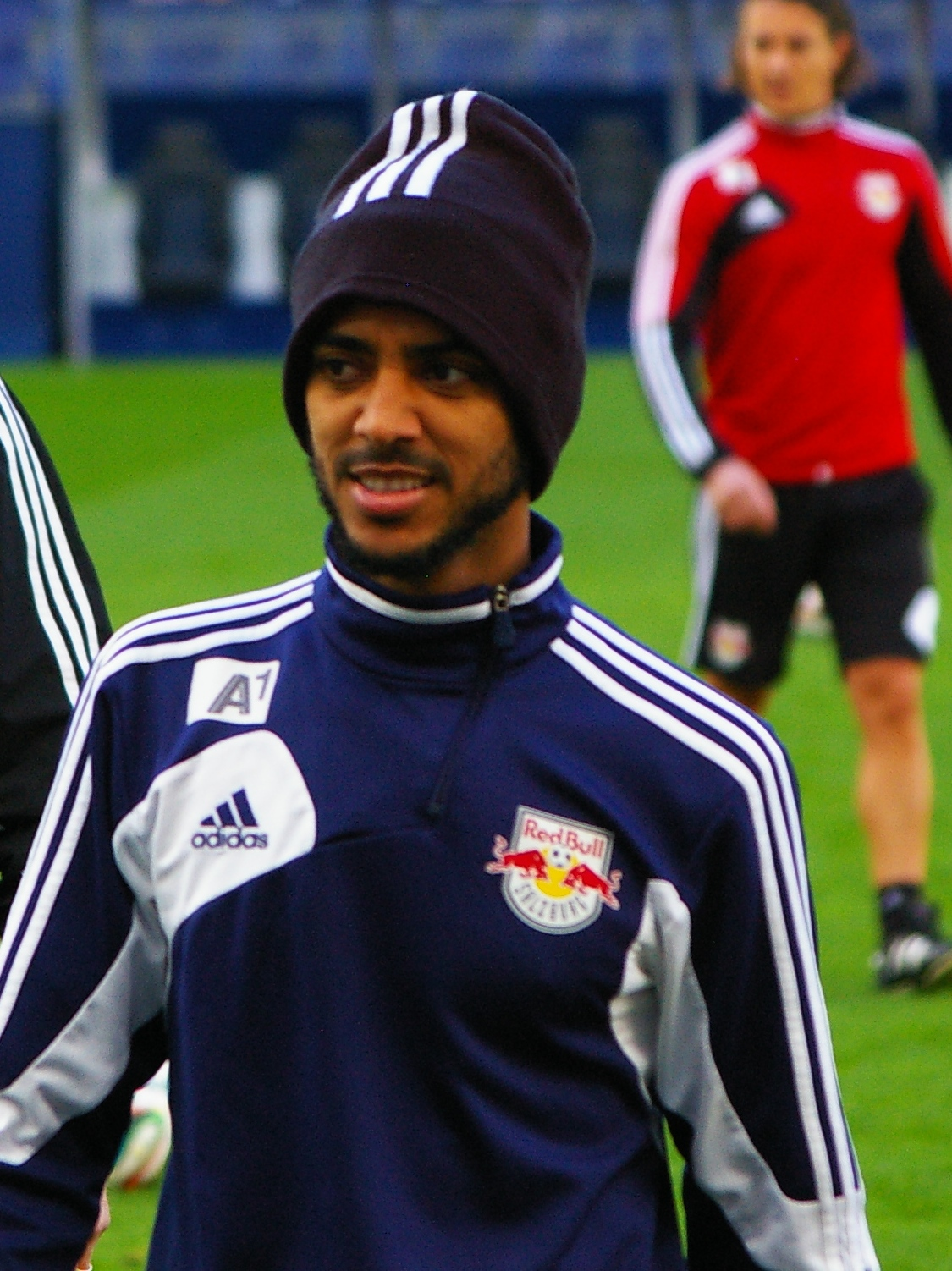
- Alan with Red Bull Salzburg in 2014

Personal information
- Full name: A Lan
- Birth name: Alan Douglas Borges de Carvalho
- Date of birth: 10 July 1989 (age 37)
- Place of birth: José Bonifácio, São Paulo, Brazil
- Height: 1.83 m (6 ft 0 in)
- Position: Forward

Youth career
- 2006–2007: Londrina
- 2007–2008: Fluminense

Senior career*
Years	Team	Apps	(Gls)
2007–2008	Londrina	6	(4)
2008–2010	Fluminense	46	(11)
2010–2015	Red Bull Salzburg	88	(59)
2015–2021	Guangzhou FC	78	(40)
2019–2020	→ Tianjin Tianhai (loan)	27	(9)
2020	→ Beijing Guoan (loan)	15	(5)
2022–2023	Fluminense	5	(2)
2024	Qingdao West Coast	25	(11)
Total		290	(141)

International career^{‡}
2009–2010	Brazil U20	5	(1)
2021–2024	China	14	(3)
- * Club domestic league appearances and goals as of 23 July 2024 ‡ National team caps and goals as of 7 September 2024

Alan
- Simplified Chinese: 阿兰
- Traditional Chinese: 阿蘭
Transcriptions
Standard Mandarin
- Hanyu Pinyin: Ā Lán

Alternative Chinese name
- Simplified Chinese: 阿兰·道格拉斯·博尔热斯·德·卡瓦略
- Traditional Chinese: 阿蘭·道格拉斯·博爾熱斯·德·卡瓦略
Transcriptions
Standard Mandarin
- Hanyu Pinyin: Ālán Dàogélāsī Bó'ěrrèsī dé Kǎwǎlüè

Alan Douglas Borges de Carvalho (born 10 July 1989), or simply Alan and pronounced in Mandarin as A Lan (Chinese: 阿兰; pinyin: Ā Lán), is a former professional footballer who played as a forward. Born in Brazil, he played for the China national team.

After spells in Brazil with Londrina and Fluminense, Alan joined Austrian club Red Bull Salzburg in 2010. There he established himself in the first team and became an intrinsic part of the squad. His playing time was limited in the 2011–12 season owing to an injury. Nevertheless, Alan scored regularly for the club, including many hat-tricks. In 2015, after playing nearly 130 matches for the Austrian side and scoring nearly 100 goals, he signed with Chinese Super League club Guangzhou Evergrande.

== Club career ==
=== Brazil ===
Born in Barbosa, São Paulo, Alan signed for Londrina, in 2007. In 2008, he was given a professional contract by Fluminense with whom he played for two seasons till 2010. He scored 11 league goals for the club and also won the 2010 Brasileiro.

=== Red Bull Salzburg ===
On 11 August 2010, Alan signed for Austrian club Red Bull Salzburg for an undisclosed fee, as a replacement for Marc Janko who headed to FC Twente. He made his debut for the club in UEFA Champions League qualifier against Hapoel Tel Aviv which his team lost 2–3. In that match he came as a 67th-minute substitute for Franz Schiemer. In his first season with the club, Alan scored a hat-trick against Sturm Graz on 16 April 2011. Alan also scored braces against Austria Wien and SC Wiener Neustadt as he ended the season with 10 league goals.

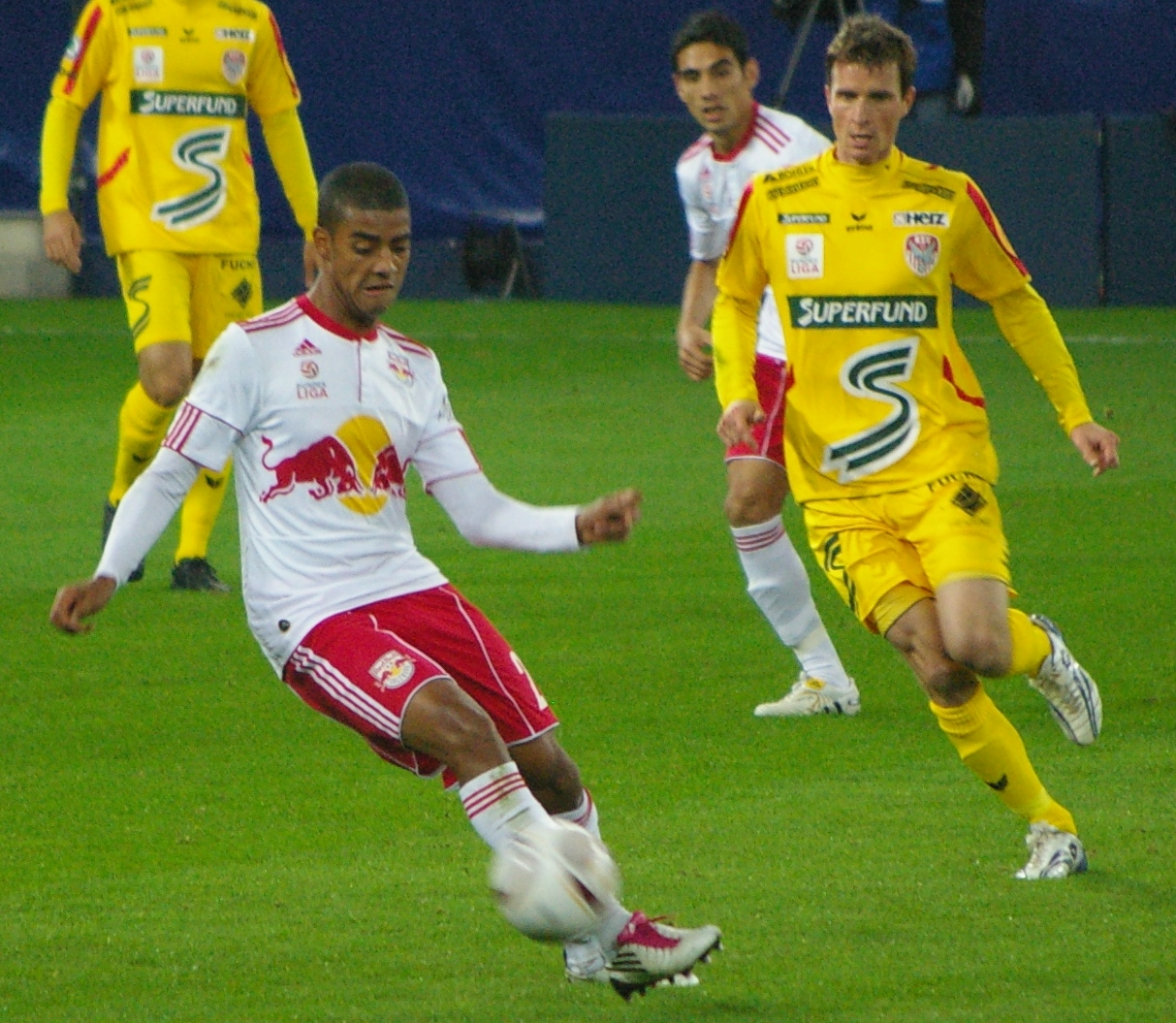
Alan in action against Kapfenberger SV in October 2010

Alan started the 2011–12 season by scoring a hat-trick against Latvian side FK Liepājas Metalurgs. His goal scoring streak continued as he scored a brace against FK Senica as well as scoring in a defeat against AC Omonia. However his playing time in his second season with the Austrian club was limited as he ruptured his cruciate ligament in a league match against Rapid Vienna on 28 August 2011 and was ruled out of action for at least six months.

Alan got back on training on 20 November 2012. He finished the 2012–13 season with 11 goals in 14 league matches and did not play in any continental match.

The 2013–14 season proved to be the most successful season so far for the Brazilian striker. On 8 February 2014, Alan scored a hat-trick against relegation threatened SV Grodig. In that match, the same feat would also be achieved by his Spanish partner Jonathan Soriano. He also received two red cards - one against SV Ried and another against FC Basel in an UEFA Europa League encounter. Alan ended the season winning the Austrian Football Bundesliga and Austrian Cup - completing a domestic double. He was the second topscorer only behind teammate Soriano.

The following season too, started well for Alan, as he scored regularly for his side. On 23 October 2014, Alan scored a hat-trick as Salzburg won 4–2 against Dinamo Zagreb in the UEFA Europa League group stage. He added another two on 27 November in a 3–1 win at Celtic Park which ensured that Salzburg became the first ever Austrian club to win in Scotland, striking in the 8th and 13th minutes. In his penultimate league match for his club, he scored a hat-trick, scoring in 52nd, 58th and 60th minute against FK Austria Wien. Despite leaving halfway through the season, with eight goals he was the joint top scorer in the season's Europa League, alongside Everton's Romelu Lukaku. This was the second consecutive time that a Red Bull player had achieved this honour, after his strike partner Soriano.

=== Guangzhou Evergrande ===
On 16 January 2015, Chinese Super League side Guangzhou Evergrande Taobao officially announced they had signed Alan from Red Bull Salzburg on a four-year contract for a transfer fee of €11.1 million. He was issued the number 7 jersey. On 14 February 2015, he made his official debut in the 2015 Chinese FA Super Cup against Shandong Luneng, coming on as a substitute for Gao Lin. On 3 March 2015, Alan suffered a cruciate ligament rupture while training before the 2015 AFC Champions League match against Western Sydney Wanderers, ruling him out for at least five months. After Paulinho and Robinho joined the club in July, Alan, who was still recovering from injury, was degraded to the reserve team squad for the second half of the season due to foreign player limit. He was named in the 23-man squad for the 2015 FIFA Club World Cup but didn't play in the tournament, while manager Luiz Felipe Scolari explained that he just recovered from injury and was not ready to play.

Alan made his return on 6 March 2016, 370 days after his injury, in a Super League match against Chongqing Lifan, coming on as a substitute for Huang Bowen. Alan scored his first goal in his fifth appearance for Guangzhou on 24 April 2016, in a 4–0 away victory against Tianjin Teda. He went on to score in the next five matches, including 2–1 win over Shanghai Greenland Shenhua, 2–1 win over Hangzhou Greentown, 2–0 win over Hebei China Fortune, 3–0 win over Liaoning during Guangzhou Evergrande's 9-league winning streak and 2–0 win against Nei Mongol Zhongyou in the CFA Cup. Alan scored 18 goals in 35 appearances as Guangzhou won the double of 2016 Chinese Super League and 2016 Chinese FA Cup.

On 22 February 2017, Alan started the season with Guangzhou Evergrande in an emphatic 7–0 home victory over Hong Kong side Eastern in the 2017 AFC Champions League. He missed a penalty in the first half but scored in the second half. On 25 February, he scored the winning goal in a 1–0 win against Jiangsu Suning in the 2017 Chinese FA Super Cup and was awarded the most valuable player of the tournament. He made 43 appearances and scored 21 goals in the 2017 season, acting an important part of Guangzhou Evergrande's winning their seventh consecutive title of the league.

Alan scored his first goal in the 2018 season on 26 February 2018 in a 4–1 victory over Shanghai Greenland Shenhua to win the 2018 Chinese FA Super Cup. He was awarded the most valuable player for the second time. On 2 March, he scored his first hat-trick in China in a 5–4 home loss to city rivals Guangzhou R&F in the first league match of the season. Alan continued his impressive performance in March, scoring eight goals in five matches until 30 March, he was sent off during a league match against Tianjin Quanjian for throwing an elbow at Liu Yiming. On 10 April, he was handed an 8-match suspension in the Super League by the CFA. On 17 April, Alan scored twice in a 3–1 win over Cerezo Osaka, which ensure Guangzhou's qualification to the Knockout stage of 2018 AFC Champions League. On 2 May, he scored a penalty at the second half but missed his penalty shootout attempt in the fifth round of 2018 Chinese FA Cup against Guizhou Hengfeng as Guangzhou eliminated from the tournament by 4–1 in the penalty shootout. Alan made his 100th cap for Guangzhou on 3 November 2018 in the league titles deciding match against Shanghai SIPG. He scored twice but Guangzhou finally lost 5–4.

==== Loan to Tianjin Tianhai ====
On 7 February 2019, Alan was loaned to fellow first-tier club Tianjin Tianhai for the 2019 season. He made his debut for the club on 1 March 2019, playing the whole match in a 3–0 away defeat against his former club Guangzhou Evergrande.

==== Loan to Beijing Guoan ====
On 29 February 2020, it was announced that Alan would be loaned to Beijing Guoan for the 2020 season. He scored his first goal for the club on 6 August 2020 against Tianjin TEDA.

=== Return to Fluminense ===
On 21 June 2022, Alan rejoined Fluminense on a two-year deal. On 18 August 2023, Alan's contract with Fluminense was terminated by mutual consent.

=== Qingdao West Coast ===
On 24 February 2024, Alan returned to China and signed a with Chinese Super League club Qingdao West Coast. On 21 February 2025, Alan left the club after the end of 2024 season.

== International career ==
Alan played three matches for the Brazil under-20 team in an unofficial tournament.

In March 2013, Alan described himself as half-Austrian and expressed his desire to play for the Austria national football team. He said "Maybe I'll play sometime for Austria." But according to FIFA rules he had to play at least five years in Austria to be able to represent the national team. However his move to Guangzhou Evergrande dented the hope of playing for Austria as he was only six months shy of five years while joining the Chinese outfit.

In 2019, Alan obtained Chinese citizenship via naturalisation, which makes him eligible to play for the China national football team.

He made his debut for China on 30 May 2021 in a World Cup qualifier against Guam, he came on as a substitute and scored twice in a 7–0 victory.

== Style of play ==
A statement by Guangzhou Evergrande described Alan as a "blade", who is physically very strong and make wise use of opportunities. He has also been said as "strong, energetic, skilled" and a player with good control of the ball. Alan is equally adept in his both left and right foot. He is also known for his first-time lay-offs.

== Career statistics ==
=== Club ===
As of match played 7 September 2024

Appearances and goals by club, season and competition
Club	Season	League			State League		National Cup (Note: Includes Copa do Brasil, Austrian Cup, Chinese FA Cup)		Continental		Other		Total	
Club	Season	Division	Apps	Goals	Apps	Goals	Apps	Goals	Apps	Goals	Apps	Goals	Apps	Goals
Fluminense	2008	Série A	13	1	2 (Note: Appearances in Campeonato Carioca)	3	0	0	1	0	—		16	4
Fluminense	2009	Série A	23	6	5	2	3	1	0	0	—		31	9
Fluminense	2010	Série A	10	4	14	4	4	2	10	2	—		38	12
Fluminense	Total		46	11	21	9	7	3	11	2	—		85	25
Red Bull Salzburg	2010–11	Austrian Bundesliga	24	10	—		2	0	6	0	—		32	10
Red Bull Salzburg	2011–12	Austrian Bundesliga	5	3	–		1	2	5	6	—		11	11
Red Bull Salzburg	2012–13	Austrian Bundesliga	14	11	—		0	0	0	0	—		14	11
Red Bull Salzburg	2013–14	Austrian Bundesliga	29	26	—		5	6	12	5	—		46	37
Red Bull Salzburg	2014–15	Austrian Bundesliga	16	9	—		2	7	8	8	—		26	24
Red Bull Salzburg	Total		88	59	—		10	15	31	19	—		129	93
Guangzhou Evergrande	2015	CSL	0	0	—		0	0	1	0	1 (Note: Appearances in Chinese FA Super Cup)	0	2	0
Guangzhou Evergrande	2016	CSL	27	14	—		8	4	0	0	0	0	35	18
Guangzhou Evergrande	2017	CSL	27	10	—		5	3	10	7	1	1	43	21
Guangzhou Evergrande	2018	CSL	12	13	—		1	1	8	4	1	1	22	19
Guangzhou Evergrande	2021	CSL	12	3	—		0	0	0	0	—		12	3
Guangzhou Evergrande	Total		78	40	—		14	8	19	11	3	2	114	61
Tianjin Tianhai (loan)	2019	CSL	27	9	—		0	0	—		—		27	9
Beijing Guoan (loan)	2020	CSL	15	5	—		1	2	6	4	—		22	11
Fluminense	2022	Série A	4	1	—		0	0	—		—		4	1
Fluminense	2023	Série A	1	1	6	1	1	0	3	0	—		11	2
Fluminense	Total		5	2	6	1	1	0	1	0	—		13	3
Qingdao West Coast	2024	CSL	22	11	—		0	0	0	0	—		22	11
Career total			281	137	27	10	35	28	68	36	3	2	414	213

=== International ===
China PR
Year	Apps	Goals
2021	8	3
2022	2	0
2024	4	0
Total	14	3

Scores and results list China's goal tally first.

No.	Date	Venue	Opponent	Score	Result	Competition
1.	30 May 2021	Suzhou Olympic Sports Centre, Suzhou, China	Guam	6–0	7–0	2022 FIFA World Cup qualification
2.	30 May 2021	Suzhou Olympic Sports Centre, Suzhou, China	Guam	7–0	7–0	2022 FIFA World Cup qualification
3.	11 June 2021	Sharjah Stadium, Sharjah, United Arab Emirates	Maldives	3–0	5–0	2022 FIFA World Cup qualification

== Honours ==
=== Club ===
Red Bull Salzburg

- Austrian Bundesliga: 2011–12, 2013–14
- Austrian Cup: 2011–12, 2013–14

Guangzhou Evergrande

- Chinese Super League: 2016, 2017
- Chinese FA Cup: 2016
- Chinese FA Super Cup: 2016, 2017, 2018

Fluminense

- Taça Guanabara: 2023
- Campeonato Carioca: 2023

=== Individual ===
- Austrian Cup Top goalscorer: 2013–14, 2014–15
- UEFA Europa League Top goalscorer: 2014–15
- UEFA Europa League Squad of the Season: 2014–15
- Chinese FA Super Cup Most Valuable Player (2): 2017, 2018

== See also ==
- List of Chinese naturalized footballers
