= Ruan Zhexiang =

Chinese association football player

Personal information
- Date of birth: 21 January 1997 (age 29)
- Height: 1.76 m (5 ft 9 in)
- Position: Midfielder

Team information
- Current team: Dalian LFTZ Huayi

Youth career
- –2019: Liaoning F.C.

Senior career*
Years	Team	Apps	(Gls)
2019–2020	Liaoning F.C.	13	(0)
2020–2021	Qingdao Huanghai	12	(0)
2022-	Dalian LFTZ Huayi	0	(0)
- * Club domestic league appearances and goals as of 14:01, 23 May 2022 (UTC)

Ruan Zhexiang (Chinese: 阮喆祥; born 21 January 1997) is a Chinese footballer who plays as a midfielder for Chinese club Dalian LFTZ Huayi.

== Club career ==
Ruan Zhexiang was promoted to the senior team of Liaoning F.C. within the 2019 China League One season and would make his debut in a Chinese FA Cup game on 16 April 2019 against Baoding Yingli ETS in a 1-0 victory. He would go on to establish himself as a regular within the team, however the club disbanded due to wage arrears and he was allowed to leave the team. On 29 July 2020, Ruan would join Qingdao Huanghai.

== Career statistics ==
As of 31 December 2020.

Club	Season	League			National Cup		Continental		Other		Total	
Club	Season	Division	Apps	Goals	Apps	Goals	Apps	Goals	Apps	Goals	Apps	Goals
Liaoning F.C.	2019	China League One	13	0	2	0	–		0 (Note: Appearances in China League One relegation play-offs)	0	15	0
Qingdao Huanghai	2020	Chinese Super League	3	0	0	0	–		–		3	0
Career total			16	0	2	0	0	0	0	0	18	0
