= Liu Hao (footballer) =

Chinese footballer

Liu Hao 刘浩
Personal information
- Full name: Liu Hao
- Date of birth: 15 January 1996 (age 30)
- Place of birth: Dujiangyan, Sichuan, China
- Height: 1.75 m (5 ft 9 in)
- Position: Right-back

Youth career
- 2008–2014: Hangzhou Greentown
- 2015–2016: Guangzhou Evergrande

Senior career*
| Years | Team | Apps | (Gls) |
| 2016–2017 | Guangzhou Evergrande | 0 | (0) |
| 2016–2017 | → Guizhou Hengfeng (loan) | 12 | (1) |
| 2018 | Guizhou Hengfeng | 9 | (1) |
| 2019 | Sichuan Longfor | 30 | (1) |
| 2020–2021 | Guizhou Hengfeng | 43 | (2) |
| 2022-2024 | Suzhou Dongwu | 42 | (1) |
| 2024 | Guizhou Zhucheng Athletic | 9 | (1) |
| 2025 | Guangxi Pingguo | 19 | (0) |

International career^{‡}
| 2011–2012 | China U-17 | 9 | (1) |
| 2017–2018 | China U-23 | 4 | (0) |
- * Club domestic league appearances and goals as of 27 April 2022 ‡ National team caps and goals as of 27 March 2018

Liu Hao (Chinese: 刘浩; pinyin: Liú Hào; Mandarin pronunciation: [ljǒʊ xâʊ]; born 15 January 1996) is a Chinese footballer.

== Club career ==
Liu Hao joined Hangzhou Greentown's youth academy in 2008. He transferred to Chinese Super League side Guangzhou Evergrande in January 2015.

Liu started his professional football career in June 2016 when he was loaned to China League One side Guizhou Zhicheng for six months. He made his debut for Guizhou on 3 July 2016 in a 1–0 away win against Meizhou Hakka, coming on as a substitute for Wang Fan in the 57th minute. On 31 July 2016, he scored his first senior goal in his fourth appearance for Guizhou, which ensured Guizhou's 2–0 win against Beijing Enterprises Group. Liu made ten appearances in the second half of 2016 season as Guizhou finished the runners-up of the league and won promotion to the first tier. On 24 February 2017, Guizhou Hengfeng Zhicheng extended Liu's loan deal for one season. He made his Super League debut on 22 April 2017 in a 2–0 home defeat against Shanghai Shenhua. Liu made a permanent transfer to Guizhou Hengfeng on 28 February 2018 with a three-year contract. On 20 October 2018, he scored his first Super League goal in a 3–0 home win over Dalian Yifang.

On 1 March 2019, Liu transferred to hometown club Sichuan Longfor who newly promoted to China League One.

== Career statistics ==
As of 28 October 2023.

Appearances and goals by club, season and competition
| Club | Season | League | | | National Cup | | Continental | | Other | | Total | |
| Club | Season | Division | Apps | Goals | Apps | Goals | Apps | Goals | Apps | Goals | Apps | Goals |
|---|---|---|---|---|---|---|---|---|---|---|---|---|
| Guizhou Hengfeng (Loan) | 2016 | China League One | 10 | 1 | 0 | 0 | - | | - | | 10 | 1 |
| Guizhou Hengfeng (Loan) | 2017 | Chinese Super League | 2 | 0 | 1 | 0 | - | | - | | 3 | 0 |
| Guizhou Hengfeng (Loan) | Total | | 12 | 1 | 1 | 0 | 0 | 0 | 0 | 0 | 13 | 1 |
| Guizhou Hengfeng | 2018 | Chinese Super League | 9 | 1 | 0 | 0 | - | | - | | 9 | 1 |
| Sichuan Longfor | 2019 | China League One | 30 | 1 | 1 | 0 | - | | - | | 31 | 1 |
| Guizhou Hengfeng | 2020 | China League One | 13 | 2 | 1 | 0 | - | | - | | 14 | 2 |
| Guizhou Hengfeng | 2021 | China League One | 30 | 0 | 1 | 0 | - | | - | | 31 | 0 |
| Guizhou Hengfeng | Total | | 43 | 2 | 2 | 0 | 0 | 0 | 0 | 0 | 45 | 2 |
| Suzhou Dongwu | 2022 | China League One | 24 | 0 | 2 | 0 | - | | - | | 26 | 0 |
| Suzhou Dongwu | 2023 | China League One | 18 | 1 | 2 | 0 | - | | - | | 20 | 1 |
| Suzhou Dongwu | Total | | 42 | 1 | 4 | 0 | 0 | 0 | 0 | 0 | 46 | 1 |
| Career total | | | 136 | 6 | 8 | 0 | 0 | 0 | 0 | 0 | 144 | 6 |
