= Gu Cao =

Chinese footballer

Gu Cao 顾操
Personal information
- Full name: Gu Cao
- Date of birth: 31 May 1988 (age 38)
- Place of birth: Shanghai, China
- Height: 1.82 m (5 ft 11 1/2 in)
- Position: Centre-back

Senior career*
Years	Team	Apps	(Gls)
2006–2007	Shanghai Shenhua	0	(0)
2008–2024	Henan FC	273	(1)
Medal record
Representing China
Men's football
AFC U-17 Championship
Gold medal – first place	2004 Japan	Team
- * Club domestic league appearances and goals as of 18 June 2025 ‡ National team caps and goals as of 18 June 2025

Gu Cao (Chinese: 顾操; born 31 May 1988 in Shanghai) is a Chinese former footballer who played as a centre-back for Henan FC.

== Club career ==
Gu Cao started his football career with Shanghai Shenhua in the 2006 season. In February 2008, Gu transferred to fellow Chinese Super League side Henan Jianye (now known as Henan FC) after not getting any playing time while at Shanghai. He would eventually make his league debut for the club on 7 September 2008 against Changsha Ginde. After not playing much for Henan for several seasons as the club was relegated in the 2012 season, Gu cemented his place as one of the team's starting defenders in the 2013 season as the club won the second tier league title and was subsequently promoted to the top flight.

On 18 June 2025, Gu announced his retirement for professional football.

== Career statistics ==
As of match played 31 December 2024

Appearances and goals by club, season and competition
Club	Season	League			National Cup		Continental		Other		Total	
Club	Season	Division	Apps	Goals	Apps	Goals	Apps	Goals	Apps	Goals	Apps	Goals
Shanghai Shenhua	2006	Chinese Super League	0	0	0	0	0	0	–		0	0
Shanghai Shenhua	2007	Chinese Super League	0	0	–		0	0	–		0	0
Shanghai Shenhua	Total		0	0	0	0	0	0	0	0	0	0
Henan Jianye/ Henan Songshan Longmen/ Henan FC	2008	Chinese Super League	16	0	–		–		–		16	0
Henan Jianye/ Henan Songshan Longmen/ Henan FC	2009	Chinese Super League	0	0	–		–		–		0	0
Henan Jianye/ Henan Songshan Longmen/ Henan FC	2010	Chinese Super League	10	0	–		0	0	–		10	0
Henan Jianye/ Henan Songshan Longmen/ Henan FC	2011	Chinese Super League	9	0	2	0	–		–		11	0
Henan Jianye/ Henan Songshan Longmen/ Henan FC	2012	Chinese Super League	13	0	0	0	–		–		13	0
Henan Jianye/ Henan Songshan Longmen/ Henan FC	2013	China League One	21	1	1	0	–		–		22	1
Henan Jianye/ Henan Songshan Longmen/ Henan FC	2014	Chinese Super League	24	0	3	0	–		–		27	0
Henan Jianye/ Henan Songshan Longmen/ Henan FC	2015	Chinese Super League	22	0	2	0	–		–		24	0
Henan Jianye/ Henan Songshan Longmen/ Henan FC	2016	Chinese Super League	22	0	3	0	–		–		25	0
Henan Jianye/ Henan Songshan Longmen/ Henan FC	2017	Chinese Super League	27	0	2	0	–		–		29	0
Henan Jianye/ Henan Songshan Longmen/ Henan FC	2018	Chinese Super League	29	0	0	0	–		–		29	0
Henan Jianye/ Henan Songshan Longmen/ Henan FC	2019	Chinese Super League	8	0	1	0	–		–		9	0
Henan Jianye/ Henan Songshan Longmen/ Henan FC	2020	Chinese Super League	12	0	1	0	–		–		13	0
Henan Jianye/ Henan Songshan Longmen/ Henan FC	2021	Chinese Super League	16	0	6	0	–		–		22	0
Henan Jianye/ Henan Songshan Longmen/ Henan FC	2022	Chinese Super League	10	0	1	0	–		–		11	0
Henan Jianye/ Henan Songshan Longmen/ Henan FC	2023	Chinese Super League	20	0	0	0	–		–		20	0
Henan Jianye/ Henan Songshan Longmen/ Henan FC	2024	Chinese Super League	14	0	3	0	–		–		17	0
Henan Jianye/ Henan Songshan Longmen/ Henan FC	Total		273	1	25	0	0	0	0	0	298	1
Career total			273	1	25	0	0	0	0	0	298	1

== Honours ==
=== Club ===
Henan Jianye

- China League One: 2013.
