= Wang Fan (footballer) =

Chinese footballer

Wang Fan 王帆
Personal information
- Full name: Wang Fan
- Date of birth: 8 March 1987 (age 39)
- Place of birth: Chongqing, Sichuan, China
- Height: 1.80 m (5 ft 11 in)
- Position: Midfielder

Senior career*
Years	Team	Apps	(Gls)
2007–2013	Chongqing Lifan	104	(14)
2014	Lijiang Jiayunhao	6	(1)
2015–2021	Guizhou Zhicheng	84	(6)
- * Club domestic league appearances and goals as of 31 December 2020

Wang Fan (Chinese: 王帆; born 8 March 1987), former name Fan Dongqing (Chinese: 范冬青) was a Chinese footballer.

== Club career ==
Wang Fan(Fan Dongqing) started his professional football career in 2007 when he joined Chongqing Lifan for the 2007 China League One campaign. In March 2014, Wang transferred to China League Two side Lijiang Jiayunhao.

On 13 July 2015, Wang transferred to China League One side Guizhou Zhicheng.

== Career statistics ==
Statistics accurate as of match played 31 December 2020.

Appearances and goals by club, season and competition
Club	Season	League			National Cup		Continental		Other		Total	
Club	Season	Division	Apps	Goals	Apps	Goals	Apps	Goals	Apps	Goals	Apps	Goals
Chongqing Lifan	2007	China League One	15	1	-		-		-		15	1
Chongqing Lifan	2008	China League One	20	5	-		-		-		20	5
Chongqing Lifan	2009	Chinese Super League	19	2	-		-		-		19	2
Chongqing Lifan	2010	Chinese Super League	15	2	-		-		-		15	2
Chongqing Lifan	2011	China League One	15	1	1	0	-		-		16	1
Chongqing Lifan	2012	China League One	28	3	1	0	-		-		29	3
Chongqing Lifan	2013	China League One	7	0	1	0	-		-		8	0
Chongqing Lifan	Total		104	14	3	0	0	0	0	0	107	14
Lijiang Jiayunhao	2014	China League Two	6	1	0	0	-		-		6	1
Guizhou Hengfeng	2015	China League One	11	0	0	0	-		-		11	0
Guizhou Hengfeng	2016	China League One	21	2	0	0	-		-		21	2
Guizhou Hengfeng	2017	Chinese Super League	24	3	0	0	-		-		24	3
Guizhou Hengfeng	2018	Chinese Super League	17	1	1	0	-		-		18	1
Guizhou Hengfeng	2019	China League One	4	0	1	0	-		-		5	0
Guizhou Hengfeng	2020	China League One	7	0	0	0	-		-		7	0
Guizhou Hengfeng	Total		84	6	2	0	0	0	0	0	86	6
Career total			194	21	5	0	0	0	0	0	199	21
