= Liang Xueming =

Chinese footballer (born 1995)

Liang Xueming 梁学铭
Personal information
- Full name: Liang Xueming
- Date of birth: 2 August 1995 (age 31)
- Place of birth: Panyu, Guangdong, China
- Height: 1.76 m (5 ft 9 1/2 in)
- Positions: Striker; winger

Team information
- Current team: Guangdong GZ-Power
- Number: 10

Youth career
- Tianhe Sports School
- 2012–2014: Guangzhou Evergrande

Senior career*
Years	Team	Apps	(Gls)
2015–2016	Guangzhou Evergrande	0	(0)
2016	→ Guizhou Hengfeng (loan)	10	(1)
2017–2018	Guizhou Hengfeng	32	(2)
2019	Beijing Sport University	12	(1)
2020–2022	Meizhou Hakka	56	(18)
2023–	Guangdong GZ-Power	60	(20)

International career^{‡}
2013	China U19	5	(1)
2016–2017	China U23	3	(1)
- * Club domestic league appearances and goals as of 31 December 2025 ‡ National team caps and goals as of 28 March 2017

Liang Xueming (simplified Chinese: 梁学铭; traditional Chinese: 梁學銘; pinyin: Liáng Xuémíng; born 2 August 1995) is a Chinese footballer who currently plays for Guangdong GZ-Power

== Club career ==
Liang Xueming was promoted to Guangzhou Evergrande's first team squad in 2015 season. On 13 May 2015, he made his senior debut in a 2–1 away loss against Xinjiang Tianshan Leopard in the 2015 Chinese FA Cup. He would go on to be loaned out to China League One side Guizhou Hengfeng Zhicheng for six months on 29 June 2016. He made his debut for Guizhou on 10 July 2016 in a 2–0 home win against Qingdao Huanghai, coming on as a substitute for Ilhamjan Iminjan in the 86th minute. On 17 July 2016, he scored his first senior goal and won a penalty in his second appearance for Guizhou, which ensured Guizhou's 4–1 win against Zhejiang Yiteng. Liang made ten appearances in the second half of 2016 season as Guizhou finished the runners-up of the league and won promotion to the first tier.

On 24 February 2017, Liang made a permanent transfer to Guizhou Hengfeng Zhicheng. He made his Super League debut on 3 March 2017 in a 1–1 home draw against Liaoning FC. On 24 June 2017, he scored his first Super League goal in a 2–2 away draw against Shandong Luneng Taishan. He scored his second goal of the season on 17 September 2017 in a 2–1 home win over Henan Jianye. Liang scored two goals in 21 league appearances in the 2017 season. On 2 May 2018, Liang came on substitute in the second half in the fifth round of 2018 Chinese FA Cup against his former club Guangzhou Evergrande. He missed a penalty in the 71st minute but scored the equalizer in the 87th minute as Guizhou Hengfeng eventually won the match in the penalty shootout.

Liang transferred to China League One side Beijing Sport University in February 2019. After only one season with the club he was allowed to leave for Meizhou Hakka on 24 February 2020. Making his debut in a league game on 13 September 2020 against Liaoning Shenyang Urban that ended in a 2-0 victory. After the game he would go on to establish himself as a vital member of the team that gained promotion to the top tier after coming second within the division at the end of the 2021 China League One campaign.

== Career statistics ==
As of 31 December 2025.

Club	Season	League			National Cup		Continental		Other		Total	
Club	Season	Division	Apps	Goals	Apps	Goals	Apps	Goals	Apps	Goals	Apps	Goals
Guangzhou Evergrande	2015	Chinese Super League	0	0	1	0	0	0	0 (Note: Appearances in Chinese FA Super Cup and FIFA Club World Cup)	0	1	0
Guangzhou Evergrande	2016	Chinese Super League	0	0	0	0	0	0	0 (Note: Appearances in Chinese FA Super Cup)	0	0	0
Guangzhou Evergrande	Total		0	0	1	0	0	0	0	0	0	0
Guizhou Hengfeng (Loan)	2016	China League One	10	1	0	0	-		-		10	1
Guizhou Hengfeng	2017	Chinese Super League	21	2	1	0	-		-		22	2
Guizhou Hengfeng	2018	Chinese Super League	11	0	3	1	-		-		14	1
Guizhou Hengfeng	Total		32	2	4	1	0	0	0	0	36	3
Beijing Sport University	2019	China League One	12	1	2	1	-		-		14	2
Meizhou Hakka	2020	China League One	15	3	1	0	-		-		16	3
Meizhou Hakka	2021	China League One	31	14	0	0	-		-		31	14
Meizhou Hakka	2022	Chinese Super League	10	1	2	0	-		-		12	1
Meizhou Hakka	Total		56	18	3	0	0	0	0	0	59	18
Guangdong GZ-Power	2023	CMCL	13	12	-		-		-		13	12
Guangdong GZ-Power	2024	China League Two	23	6	0	0	-		-		23	6
Guangdong GZ-Power	2025	China League One	24	2	4	0	-		-		28	2
Guangdong GZ-Power	Total		60	20	4	0	0	0	0	0	64	20
Career total			170	42	14	2	0	0	0	0	184	44

== Honours ==
=== Club ===
Guangzhou Evergrande

- AFC Champions League: 2015
- Chinese Super League: 2015
- Chinese FA Super Cup: 2016

Guangdong GZ-Power

- China League Two: 2024
- China League One: 2026
