= Chen Zepeng =

Chinese footballer (born 1996)

Chen Zepeng 陈泽鹏
Personal information
- Full name: Chen Zepeng
- Date of birth: 18 May 1996 (age 30)
- Place of birth: Huilai, Guangdong, China
- Height: 1.80 m (5 ft 11 in)
- Position: Left-back

Youth career
- 2011–2014: Guangzhou R&F
- 2015: Guangzhou Evergrande

Senior career*
Years	Team	Apps	(Gls)
2015	Guangzhou R&F	0	(0)
2016–2020	Guangzhou Evergrande	9	(0)
2019	→ Beijing Sport University (loan)	7	(0)
2021	SC Minzu	9	(0)
2022	Nanjing City	25	(0)

International career^{‡}
2013–2014	China U-20	6	(0)
2016–2017	China U-23	8	(0)
- * Club domestic league appearances and goals as of 28 April 2022 ‡ National team caps and goals as of 13 November 2017

Chen Zepeng (Chinese: 陈泽鹏; pinyin: Chén Zépéng; born 18 May 1996) is a Chinese footballer.

== Club career ==
Chen Zepeng started his football career when he was promoted to Chinese Super League side Guangzhou R&F's first team squad in 2015. He transferred to Guangzhou R&F's city rivals Guangzhou Evergrande in July 2015. He made his senior debut on 10 July 2016 in a 4-1 win against Chongqing Lifan, coming on as a substitute for Liu Jian in the 38th minute. Chen was demoted to the reserve team in 2018 season.

In February 2019, Chen was loaned to China League One side Beijing Sport University for the 2019 season.

== Career statistics ==
As of 31 December 2020.

Appearances and goals by club, season and competition
Club	Season	League			National Cup		Continental		Other		Total	
Club	Season	Division	Apps	Goals	Apps	Goals	Apps	Goals	Apps	Goals	Apps	Goals
Guangzhou R&F	2015	Chinese Super League	0	0	0	0	0	0	-		0	0
Guangzhou Evergrande	2016	Chinese Super League	6	0	3	0	0	0	0 (Note: Appearances in Chinese FA Super Cup)	0	9	0
Guangzhou Evergrande	2017	Chinese Super League	3	0	3	0	0	0	0	0	6	0
Guangzhou Evergrande	2018	Chinese Super League	0	0	0	0	0	0	0	0	0	0
Guangzhou Evergrande	Total		9	0	6	0	0	0	0	0	15	0
Beijing Sport University (loan)	2019	China League One	7	0	2	0	-		-		9	0
Career total			16	0	8	0	0	0	0	0	24	0

== Honours ==
=== Club ===
Guangzhou Evergrande

- Chinese Super League: 2016, 2017
- Chinese FA Cup: 2016
- Chinese FA Super Cup: 2017, 2018
