= Wang Di (referee) =

Chinese football referee

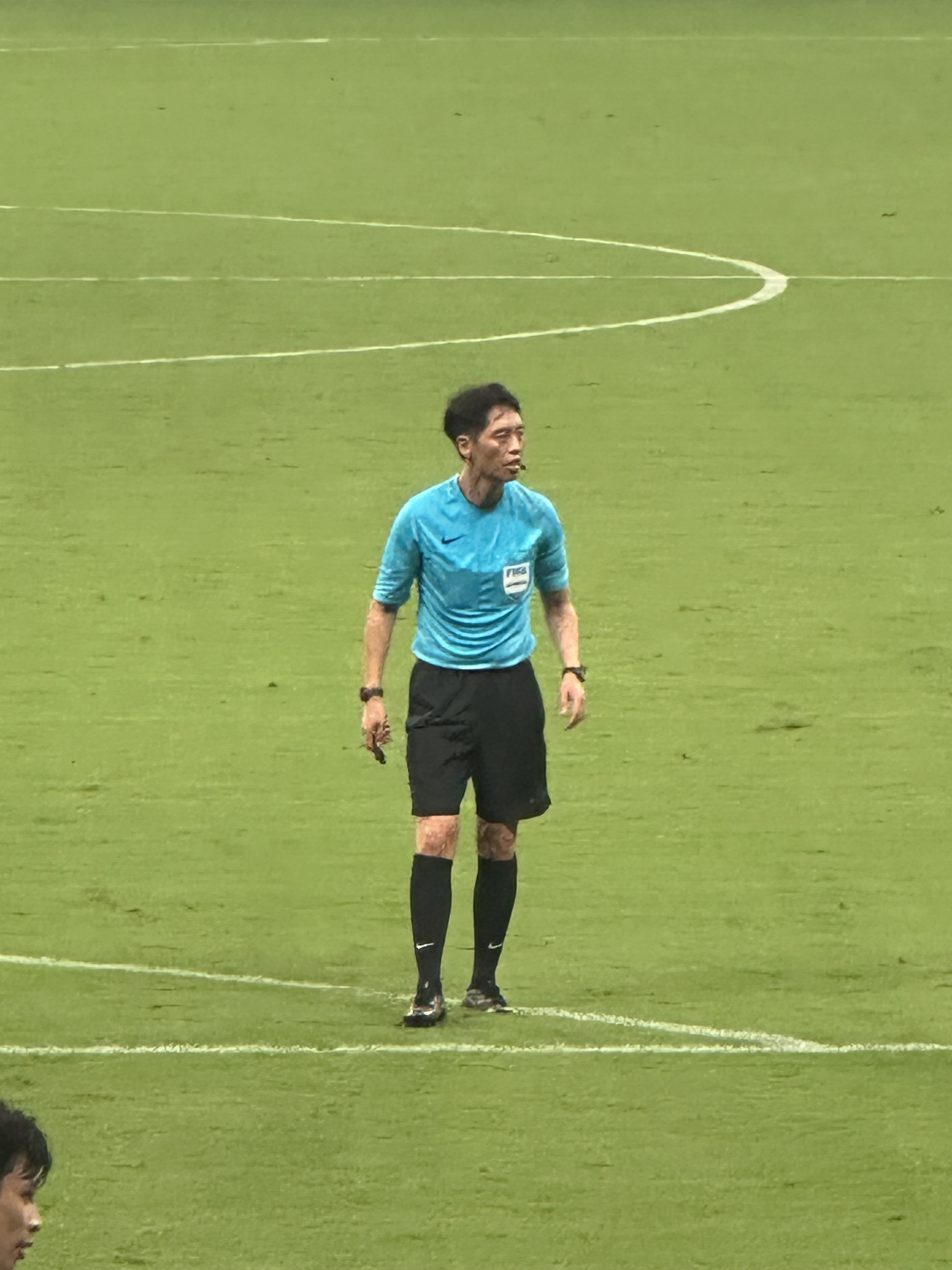
- Born: 6 April 1981 (age 45); Shanghai, China

Domestic
Years	League	Role
2010–	Chinese Super League	Referee

International
Years	League	Role
2011–2017; 2021–	FIFA listed	Referee

Wang Di (Chinese: 王迪; pinyin: Wáng Dí; Mandarin pronunciation: [wǎŋ tǐ]; born 6 April 1981) is a Chinese football referee. He has been a full international referee for FIFA from 2011 to 2017.
