= Guo Jing (footballer) =

Chinese association football player

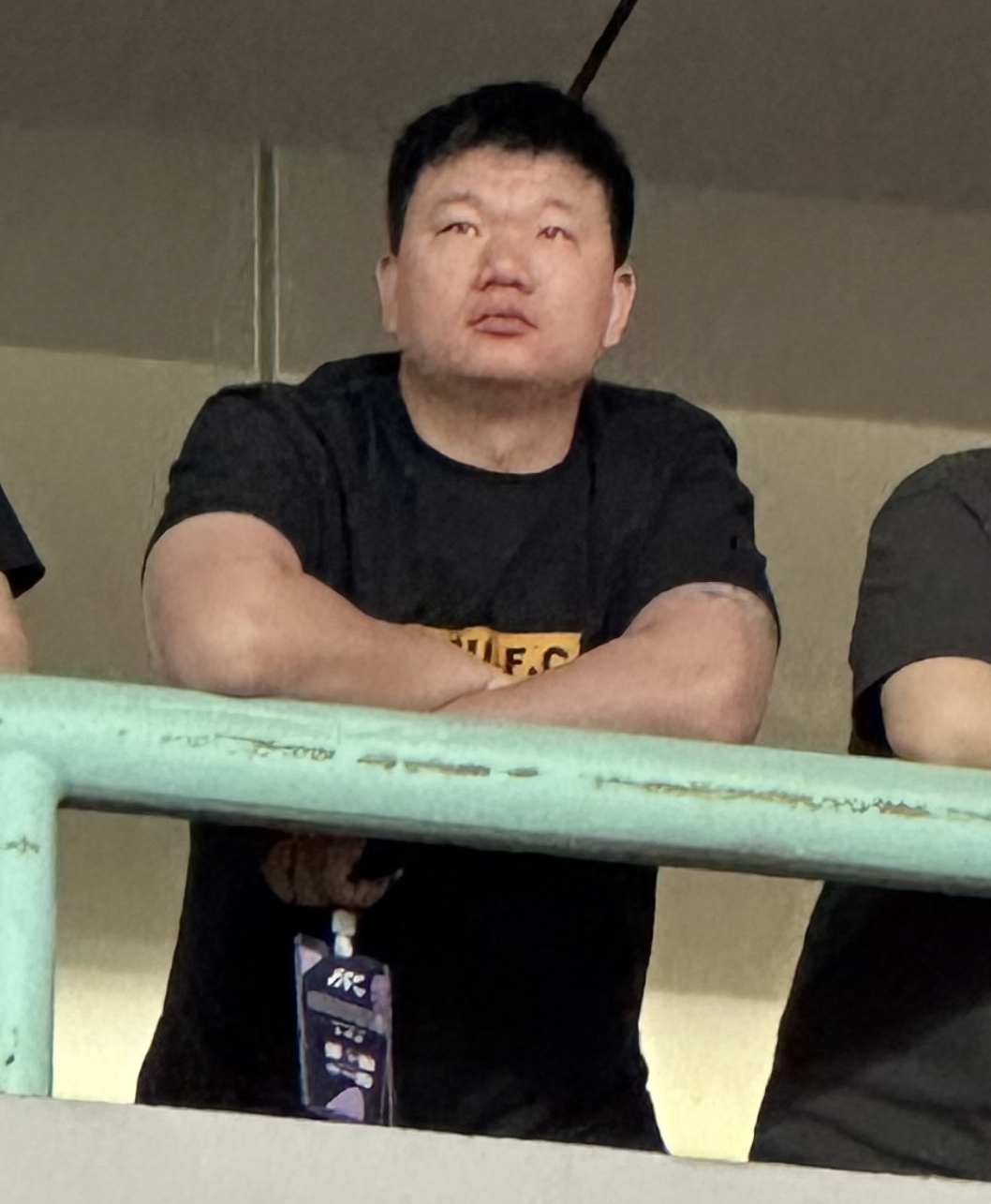
- Guo Jing in May 2025

Personal information
- Date of birth: 24 February 1997 (age 29)
- Place of birth: Putian, Fujian, China
- Height: 1.88 m (6 ft 2 in)
- Position: Defender

Youth career
- Hubei FA
- –2016: Oriental Dragon
- 2016–2017: Guangzhou Evergrande

Senior career*
Years	Team	Apps	(Gls)
2017–2021	Guangzhou Evergrande	0	(0)
2017	→ Meizhou Hakka (loan)	13	(1)
2019	→ Inner Mongolia Zhongyou (loan)	18	(0)
2020	→ Henan Jianye (loan)	3	(0)
2021	→ Suzhou Dongwu (loan)	9	(0)
2022–2023	Qingdao Youth Island	1	(0)

International career^{‡}
2018	China U20	4	(0)
2018–2019	China U22	4	(0)
- * Club domestic league appearances and goals as of 14:01, 28 December 2023 (UTC) ‡ National team caps and goals as of 14:01, 26 August 2020 (UTC)

Guo Jing (Chinese: 郭靖; born 24 February 1997) is a Chinese retired footballer who played as a defender.

== Club career ==
Guo Jing would play for the Guangzhou Evergrande youth team before he was loaned out to second tier football club Meizhou Hakka at the beginning of the 2017 league season to start his senior career. On 19 April 2017, Guo would make his senior debut against Suzhou Dongwu in a second round Chinese FA Cup match that ended in a 2-0 defeat. This was followed by his first league game for the club on 10 June 2017 against Beijing Enterprises in a 1-0 defeat. At the end of the season he would return Guangzhou and was promoted to their senior team, however after a whole season he was unable to break into the first team and was loaned out to another second tier club in Inner Mongolia Zhongyou at the beginning of the 2019 league season where he went on to make his debut for the club in a league game against Beijing Sport University in a 2-0 victory on 31 March 2019.

== Career statistics ==
As of 31 December 2020.

Club	Season	League			Cup		Continental		Other		Total	
Club	Season	Division	Apps	Goals	Apps	Goals	Apps	Goals	Apps	Goals	Apps	Goals
Guangzhou Evergrande	2017	Chinese Super League	0	0	0	0	–		–		0	0
Guangzhou Evergrande	2018	Chinese Super League	0	0	0	0	–		–		0	0
Guangzhou Evergrande	2019	Chinese Super League	0	0	0	0	–		–		0	0
Guangzhou Evergrande	2020	Chinese Super League	0	0	0	0	–		–		0	0
Guangzhou Evergrande	Total		0	0	0	0	0	0	0	0	0	0
Meizhou Hakka (loan)	2017	China League One	13	1	1 (Note: Appearances in the Chinese FA Cup)	0	–		–		14	1
Inner Mongolia Zhongyou (loan)	2019	China League One	18	0	1	0	–		–		19	0
Henan Jianye (loan)	2020	Chinese Super League	3	0	0	0	–		–		3	0
Career total			34	1	2	0	0	0	0	0	36	1
