= 2020 Guangzhou Evergrande Taobao F.C. season =

Guangzhou Evergrande Taobao
- Chairman: Gao Han (to 4 December 2020); Zheng Zhi (from 5 December 2020)
- Manager: Fabio Cannavaro
- Stadium: Tianhe Stadium
- Super League: 2nd
- FA Cup: Second round
- FA Super Cup: Cancelled
- AFC Champions League: Group stage
- Top goalscorer: League: Paulinho (12); All: Paulinho (12)
Home colours	Away colours

The 2020 Guangzhou Evergrande Taobao season is the 67th year in Guangzhou Evergrande's existence and its 53rd season in the Chinese football league, also its 31st season in the top flight.

== Transfers ==
=== In ===
==== Winter ====
Squad number	Position	Player	Age	Moving from	Type	Transfer fee	Date	Source
	FW	(China) A Lan	30	(China) Tianjin Tianhai	Loan return	-	1 January 2020	
	MF	(China) Cai Mingmin	19	(China) Kunshan	Loan return	-	1 January 2020	
	DF	(China) Chen Zepeng	23	(China) Beijing BSU	Loan return	-	1 January 2020	
	MF	(China) Deng Yubiao	22	Guangdong South China Tiger	Loan return	-	1 January 2020	
19	FW	(China) Fei Nanduo	26	Hebei China Fortune	Loan return	-	1 January 2020	
	DF	(China) Guan Haojin	24	(China) Hebei Aoli Jingying	Loan return	-	1 January 2020	
	DF	(China) Guo Jing	22	(China) Inner Mongolia Zhongyou	Loan return	-	1 January 2020	
36	MF	(China) He Chao	24	(China) Jiangsu Suning	Loan return	-	1 January 2020	
	DF	(China) Hu Ruibao	23	(China) Henan Jianye	Loan return	-	1 January 2020	
	FW	(Colombia) Jackson Martínez	33	(Portugal) Portimonense	Loan return	-	1 January 2020	
	MF	(China) Ju Feng	24	(China) Changchun Yatai	Loan return	-	1 January 2020	
	GK	(China) Li Weijie	19	(China) Shanghai Shenxin	Loan return	-	1 January 2020	
6	MF	(China) Liao Lisheng	26	(China) Tianjin Tianhai	Loan return	-	1 January 2020	
	DF	(China) Liu Ruicheng	20	(China) Xinjiang Tianshan Leopard	Loan return	-	1 January 2020	
13	GK	(China) Liu Weiguo	27	(China) Inner Mongolia Zhongyou	Loan return	-	1 January 2020	
38	DF	(China) Liu Yiming	24	(China) Shenzhen	Loan return	-	1 January 2020	
20	FW	(China) Luo Guofu	31	Guangdong South China Tiger	Loan return	-	1 January 2020	
	DF	(China) Rong Hao	32	(China) Tianjin TEDA	Loan return	-	1 January 2020	
	FW	(China) Shewket Yalqun	26	(China) Xinjiang Tianshan Leopard	Loan return	-	1 January 2020	
	FW	(China) Wang Jinze	20	(China) Inner Mongolia Zhongyou	Loan return	-	1 January 2020	
	MF	(China) Wang Junhui	24	(China) Liaoning	Loan return	-	1 January 2020	
	DF	(China) Wen Jiabao	20	(China) Tianjin Tianhai	Loan return	-	1 January 2020	
	DF	(China) Wu Yue	21	(China) Zibo Cuju	Loan return	-	1 January 2020	
	FW	(China) Xiao Taotao	22	(China) Shanghai Shenxin	Loan return	-	1 January 2020	
	FW	(China) Ye Guochen	23	(China) Wuhan Three Towns	Loan return	-	1 January 2020	
	DF	(China) Zhang Chenglin	32	(China) Tianjin Tianhai	Loan return	-	1 January 2020	
	MF	(China) Zhang Jiaqi	28	(China) Qingdao Huanghai	Loan return	-	1 January 2020	
	MF	(China) Zhang Wenzhao	32	(China) Beijing Renhe	Loan return	-	1 January 2020	

=== Out ===
==== Winter ====
Squad number	Position	Player	Age	Moving to	Type	Transfer fee	Date	Source
	FW	(Colombia) Jackson Martínez	33	(Portugal) Portimonense	End of contract	-	1 January 2020	
	DF	(China) Wen Jiabao	21	(China) Shanghai Greenland Shenhua	End of contract	-	6 January 2020	
	MF	(China) Deng Yubiao	22	(China) Shijiazhuang Ever Bright	Loan	Undisclosed	1 February 2020	
6	DF	(China) Feng Xiaoting	34	(China) Shanghai Greenland Shenhua	Loan	Free	3 February 2020	
19	GK	(China) Zeng Cheng	33	(China) Shanghai Greenland Shenhua	Loan	Free	3 February 2020	
	DF	(China) Rong Hao	32	(China) Tianjin TEDA	Loan	Undisclosed	10 February 2020	
29	FW	(China) Gao Lin	34	(China) Shenzhen	Transfer	Undisclosed	24 February 2020	

== Pre-season and friendlies ==
=== Training matches ===
Date	Opponents	H / A	Result	Scorers
2020-01-17	(United Arab Emirates) Al Dhafra	N	3–4	
2020-01-22	(China) Jiangsu Suning	N	1–3	Talisca / Teixeira (2), Luo Jing
2020-03-01	(China) Shijiazhuang Ever Bright	N	3–0	
2020-03-08	(China) Chongqing Dangdai Lifan	N	3–3	
2020-05-02	(China) Meizhou Hakka	H	5–0	Wei Shihao, Ai Kesen, Gao Late, Parmanjan (2)
2020-05-09	(China) Shenzhen Kaisa	H	4–4	Wei Shihao, Zhang Xiuwei, Gao Late, Xu Xin / Preciado (2), Dai Wai-tsun, Xu Yang
2020-05-16	(China) Shenzhen Kaisa	A	3–3	Fei Nanduo (2), Yang Liyu / Wang Yongpo, Xu Yang, Preciado (pen.)
2020-06-06	(China) Guangzhou R&F	H	2–1	Wei Shihao, Fei Nanduo / Zahavi
2020-06-13	(China) Shenzhen Kaisa	A	4–3	Wei Shihao (2), Ai Kesen, Gao Late / Preciado (3)
2020-06-20	(China) Shenzhen Kaisa	H	3–2	Wei Shihao, Tan Kaiyuan, Gao Late / Zu Pengchao, Preciado
2020-06-27	(China) Guangzhou R&F	A	0–3	/ Zahavi (2), Li Songyi
2020-07-04	(China) Guangzhou R&F	H	1–1	Wei Shihao (31') / Zahavi (35', pen.)
2020-07-07	(China) Taizhou Yuanda	H	2–1	Yang Liyu (20'), Liao Lisheng (82') / Cheng Yuan (26')
2020-07-11	Hebei China Fortune	H	1–0	Wu Shaocong
2020-07-14	(China) Guizhou Hengfeng	H	0–1	/ Wang Xuanhong (pen.)

== Competitions ==
Win Draw Loss

=== Chinese Super League ===
==== Regular season ====
===== Table =====
Pos	Team	Pld	W	D	L	GF	GA	GD	Pts	Qualification or relegation
1	Guangzhou Evergrande Taobao	14	11	1	2	31	12	+19	34	Qualification for Championship stage
2	Jiangsu Suning	14	7	5	2	23	15	+8	26	Qualification for Championship stage
3	Shandong Luneng Taishan	14	7	3	4	19	11	+8	24	Qualification for Championship stage
4	Shanghai Greenland Shenhua	14	5	6	3	16	15	+1	21	Qualification for Championship stage
5	Shenzhen Kaisa	14	5	2	7	20	20	0	17	Qualification for Relegation stage
6	Guangzhou R&F	14	4	3	7	14	28	−14	15	Qualification for Relegation stage
7	Dalian Pro	14	2	5	7	18	21	−3	11	Qualification for Relegation stage
8	Henan Jianye	14	1	3	10	14	33	−19	6	Qualification for Relegation stage

Updated to match(es) played on 27 September 2020. Source: CSL
Rules for classification:
- During season: 1) Points; 2) Goal difference; 3) Goals scored.
- After season: 1) Points; 2) Head-to-head points; 3) Head-to-head goal difference; 4) Head-to-head goals scored; 5) Scores of the weight ratio of the reserve league and youth leagues.

===== Results by round =====
Round	1	2	3	4	5	6	7	8	9	10	11	12	13	14
Result	W	W	W	L	W	W	D	W	W	W	W	W	L	W
Position	2	1	1	2	1	1	1	1	1	1	1	1	1	1

Updated to match(es) played on 27 September 2020. Source: Chinese Super League Table (in Chinese)
A = Away; H = Home; W = Win; D = Draw; L = Loss; P = Postponed

===== Matches =====
25 July 2020 1	Guangzhou Evergrande Taobao	2–0	Shanghai Greenland Shenhua	Dalian
18:15 UTC+8	Wei Shihao 7', 66'; Huang Bowen (yellow card) 20'; Liu Dianzuo (yellow card) 83'; Liao Lisheng (yellow card) 90+5'		Peng Xinli (yellow card) 29'; Wen Jiabao (yellow card) 75'; Moreno (yellow card) 86'	Stadium: Dalian Sports Center Stadium; Referee: Wang Zhe; Assistant referees: Ma Ji, Yang Yang; Fourth official: Ma Li

30 July 2020 2	Guangzhou R&F	0–5	Guangzhou Evergrande Taobao	Dalian
20:00 UTC+8	Chen Zhechao (yellow card) 29'; Tan Chun Lok (yellow card) 71'; Li Songyi (yellow card) 90+4'		Paulinho 8'; Wei Shihao 40'; Mei Fang (yellow card) 42'; Gao Zhunyi 53'; Talisca 63' (pen.); Ai Kesen 90+5'	Stadium: Jinzhou Stadium; Referee: Fu Ming; Assistant referees: Ma Ji, Yang Yang; Fourth official: Tang Shunqi

4 August 2020 3	Shenzhen Kaisa	1–3	Guangzhou Evergrande Taobao	Dalian
18:00 UTC+8	Mary 53'; Gao Lin (yellow card) 74'		Yang Liyu (yellow card) 6'; Wei Shihao 28'; Zhang Linpeng 38'; Paulinho 81'	Stadium: Dalian Professional Football Youth Training Base; Referee: Wang Jing; Assistant referees: Wu Huifeng, Huang Tao; Fourth official: Xing Qi

9 August 2020 4	Guangzhou Evergrande Taobao	0–1	Shandong Luneng Taishan	Dalian
18:00 UTC+8	Gao Zhunyi (yellow card) 61'		Guo Tianyu 60'	Stadium: Dalian Sports Center Stadium; Referee: Ma Li; Assistant referees: Zhang Cheng, Deng Bo; Fourth official: Xing Qi

14 August 2020 5	Henan Jianye	1–3	Guangzhou Evergrande Taobao	Dalian
18:00 UTC+8	Gu Cao (yellow card) 25'; Ma Xingyu (yellow card) 67'; Chen Hao (yellow card) 74'; Karanga 86'		He Chao (yellow card) 6'; Paulinho 42'; Wei Shihao (yellow card) 71' (penalty missed) 78' (pen.) 78', 84'; Zhang Xiuwei (yellow card) 90+3'	Stadium: Dalian Professional Football Youth Training Base; Referee: Wang Zhe; Assistant referees: Wu Huifeng, Xi Fei; Fourth official: Tang Shunqi

20 August 2020 6	Guangzhou Evergrande Taobao	2–1	Jiangsu Suning	Dalian
18:00 UTC+8	Zhang Linpeng (yellow card) 6' (yellow card) 38' (yellow-red card); Ai Kesen 24' (pen.); He Chao (yellow card) 36'; Mei Fang (yellow card) 60'; Park Ji-soo (yellow card) 64'; Paulinho 84'		Abduhamit (yellow card) 8'; Tian Yinong (yellow card) 12'; Éder (yellow card) 22' (goal) 54'; Zhang Xiaobin (yellow card) 45+3'; Xie Pengfei (yellow card) 50'	Stadium: Dalian Sports Center Stadium; Referee: Wang Di; Assistant referees: Zhang Cheng, Deng Bo; Fourth official: Fu Ming

25 August 2020 7	Dalian Pro	2–2	Guangzhou Evergrande Taobao	Dalian
20:00 UTC+8	Wang Yaopeng 16'; Larsson 31'; Tong Lei (yellow card) 73'		Yan Dinghao (yellow card) 21'; Mei Fang (yellow card) 52'; Paulinho 74'; Fei Nanduo 79'	Stadium: Dalian Sports Center Stadium; Referee: Fu Ming; Assistant referees: Yang Yang, Wu Huifeng; Fourth official: Guo Baolong

30 August 2020 8	Shanghai Greenland Shenhua	1–4	Guangzhou Evergrande Taobao	Dalian
20:00 UTC+8	Cao Yunding 6'; Zhu Chenjie (yellow card) 45'; Qian Jiegei (yellow card) 71'		Talisca 18'; Zheng Zhi (yellow card) 47'; Zhu Chenjie 49' (o.g.); Fei Nanduo 58'; Ai Kesen 64' (pen.)	Stadium: Dalian Professional Football Youth Training Base; Referee: Guo Baolong; Assistant referees: Ma Ji, Zhang Meilin; Fourth official: Lin Jun

4 September 2020 9	Guangzhou Evergrande Taobao	2–1	Guangzhou R&F	Dalian
20:00 UTC+8	Mei Fang (yellow card) 56'; Talisca 74'; Paulinho 90+3' (yellow card) 90+3'		Yi Teng (yellow card) 30'; Huang Zhengyu 62'	Stadium: Dalian Sports Center Stadium; Attendance: 1,500; Referee: Gu Chunhan; Assistant referees: Deng Bo, Zhang Cheng; Fourth official: Kou Jianxun

9 September 2020 10	Guangzhou Evergrande Taobao	2–0	Shenzhen Kaisa	Dalian
18:00 UTC+8	Paulinho 28'; Jiang Guangtai (yellow card) 47'; Fei Nanduo 54'; Zhang Xiuwei (yellow card) 88'		Song Ju-hun (yellow card) 88'	Stadium: Dalian Professional Football Youth Training Base; Referee: Wang Di; Assistant referees: Zhang Cheng, Deng Bo; Fourth official: Tang Shunqi

13 September 2020 11	Shandong Luneng Taishan	1–2	Guangzhou Evergrande Taobao	Dalian
20:00 UTC+8	Moisés (yellow card) 53'; Dai Lin (yellow card) 81' (yellow card) 90+6' (yellow-red card); Wu Xinghan 86'		Zheng Zhi (yellow card) 38'; Paulinho 41'; Ai Kesen 70'; Gao Zhunyi (yellow card) 78'; Luo Guofu (red card) 90+5'	Stadium: Dalian Sports Center Stadium; Attendance: 2,000; Referee: Wang Di; Assistant referees: Zhang Cheng, Deng Bo; Fourth official: Tang Shunqi

21 September 2020 12	Guangzhou Evergrande Taobao	2–1	Henan Jianye	Dalian
15:30 UTC+8	Ai Kesen 14' (pen.); Paulinho 25'; Liao Lisheng (yellow card) 68'		Ivo 29'; Karanga (penalty missed) 65' (pen.); Ma Xingyu (yellow card) 73'	Stadium: Dalian Sports Center Stadium; Attendance: 600; Referee: Wang Jing; Assistant referees: Zhang Haijun, Xi Fei; Fourth official: Zhen Wei

24 September 2020 13	Jiangsu Suning	2–1	Guangzhou Evergrande Taobao	Dalian
18:00 UTC+8	Teixeira 44' (yellow card) 89'; Éder 76'; Miranda (yellow card) 85'; Li Ang (yellow card) 90+4'		Yang Liyu (yellow card) 28'; Deng Hanwen (yellow card) 70'; Zheng Zhi (yellow card) 71'; He Chao 72' (yellow card) after match	Stadium: Jinzhou Stadium; Referee: Ma Li; Assistant referees: Xi Fei, Zhang Meilin; Fourth official: Niu Minghui

27 September 2020 14	Guangzhou Evergrande Taobao	1–0	Dalian Pro	Dalian
20:00 UTC+8	Shan Pengfei 48' (o.g.)		Li Shuai (yellow card) 89'	Stadium: Dalian Sports Center Stadium; Attendance: 1,991; Referee: Fu Ming; Assistant referees: Liu Xing, Xi Fei; Fourth official: Xing Qi

==== Championship stage ====
===== Quarter-finals =====
16 October 2020 First leg	Hebei China Fortune	1–3	Guangzhou Evergrande Taobao	Kunshan
19:35 UTC+8	Zhang Junzhe (yellow card) 35'; Yin Hongbo 38'; Bao Yaxiong (yellow card) 52'; Paulinho (yellow card) 78'		Xu Xin (yellow card) 56'; Wu Shaocong 65'; Ai Kesen 87' (pen.); Wei Shihao 90+1'	Stadium: Kunshan Sports Centre Stadium; Attendance: 1,580; Referee: Shi Zhenlu; Assistant referees: Song Xiangyun, Sun Kai; Fourth official: Xia Jun

21 October 2020 Second leg	Guangzhou Evergrande Taobao	5–0	Hebei China Fortune	Kunshan
19:35 UTC+8	Zhang Linpeng (yellow card) 11'; Talisca 27', 62'; Fei Nanduo 36', 56'; Paulinho 81'		Pan Ximing (yellow card) 40'	Stadium: Kunshan Sports Centre Stadium; Attendance: 832; Referee: Ai Kun; Assistant referees: Song Xiangyun, Yang Xi; Fourth official: Jin Jingyuan

Guangzhou Evergrande Taobao won 8–1 on aggregate.

===== Semi-finals =====
28 October 2020 First leg	Beijing Sinobo Guoan	0–0	Guangzhou Evergrande Taobao	Suzhou
19:35 UTC+8	Viera (yellow card) 39'; Jin Taiyan (yellow card) 72'		Zheng Zhi (yellow card) 4'; Yang Liyu (yellow card) 78'	Stadium: Suzhou Sports Center; Attendance: 1,785; Referee: Ko Hyung-jin (South Korea); Assistant referees: Wang Dexin, Sun Kai; Fourth official: Liu Lin

2 November 2020 Second leg	Guangzhou Evergrande Taobao	3–1	Beijing Sinobo Guoan	Suzhou
19:35 UTC+8	Wei Shihao (yellow card) 30'; Park Ji-soo (yellow card) 31'; Talisca 39' (pen.); He Chao (yellow card) 41'; Paulinho 56', 81'; Wu Shaocong (yellow card) 68'; Zhang Xiuwei (yellow card) 85'; Liu Dianzuo (yellow card) 90+1'		Li Lei (yellow card) 25'; Zhang Yuning 61'	Stadium: Suzhou Olympic Sports Centre; Attendance: 2,849; Referee: Kim Hee-gon (South Korea); Assistant referees: Cao Yi, Ma Ji; Fourth official: Xia Jun

Guangzhou Evergrande Taobao won 3–1 on aggregate.

===== Final =====
8 November 2020 First leg	Jiangsu Suning	0–0	Guangzhou Evergrande Taobao	Suzhou
19:35 UTC+8	Gao Tianyi (yellow card) 37'; Yang Boyu (yellow card) 50'; Li Ang (yellow card) 85'		Wei Shihao (yellow card) 21'; Huang Bowen (yellow card) 39'; Park Ji-soo (yellow card) 59'	Stadium: Suzhou Olympic Sports Centre; Attendance: 6,673; Referee: Shi Zhenlu; Assistant referees: Wang Dexin, Ma Ji; Fourth official: Guo Baolong

12 November 2020 Second leg	Guangzhou Evergrande Taobao	1–2	Jiangsu Suning	Suzhou
19:35 UTC+8	Talisca (yellow card) 24'; He Chao (red card) 45+1'; Park Ji-soo (yellow card) 59'; Wei Shihao 61'		Ji Xiang (yellow card) 21'; Éder 45+3' (yellow card) 49'; Teixeira 47'; Luo Jing (yellow card) 90+2'; Gu Chao (yellow card) 90+3'; Zhang Yan (yellow card) 90+6'; Abduhamit (yellow card) 90+6'; Santini (yellow card) 90+7'	Stadium: Suzhou Olympic Sports Centre; Attendance: 9,386; Referee: Ko Hyung-jin (South Korea); Assistant referees: Song Xiangyun, Cao Yi; Fourth official: Liu Wei

Guangzhou Evergrande Taobao lost 1–2 on aggregate.

=== Chinese FA Cup ===
18 September 2020 First round	Guangzhou Evergrande Taobao	2–0	Henan Jianye	Dalian
19:35 UTC+8	Tan Kaiyuan 32'; Luo Guofu 65'			Stadium: Dalian Professional Football Youth Training Base; Referee: Tang Shunqi; Assistant referees: Ma Ji, Xi Fei; Fourth official: Guo Baolong

26 November 2020 Second round	Guangzhou Evergrande Taobao	0–3	Kunshan FC	Kunshan
19:35 UTC+8	Zhao Wenzhe (yellow card) 84'		Adeniji 7'; Tu Dongxu 20'; Ruan Yang (yellow card) 39'; Pereira 60'	Stadium: Kunshan Sports Centre Stadium; Attendance: 1,196; Referee: Wan Tao; Assistant referees: Song Xiangyun, Su Xiaofei; Fourth official: Zhang Lei

=== Chinese FA Super Cup ===
	Guangzhou Evergrande Taobao	Cancelled	Shanghai Greenland Shenhua	Suzhou
--:-- UTC+8				Stadium: Suzhou Olympic Sports Centre

=== AFC Champions League ===
==== Group stage ====
Pos	Team	Pld	W	D	L	GF	GA	GD	Pts	Qualification	VIS	SUW	GZE	JDT
1	(Japan) Vissel Kobe	4	2	0	2	4	5	−1	6	Advance to knockout stage	—	0–2	0–2	~~5–1~~
2	(South Korea) Suwon Samsung Bluewings	4	1	2	1	3	2	+1	5	Advance to knockout stage	0–1	—	0–0	~~25 Nov~~
3	(China) Guangzhou Evergrande	4	1	2	1	4	4	0	5		1–3	1–1	—	~~4 Dec~~
4	(Malaysia) Johor Darul Ta'zim	0	0	0	0	0	0	0	0	Withdrew (Note: Johor Darul Ta'zim were unable to travel to Qatar to play the final four matches of the group stage due to the COVID-19 pandemic travel restrictions after they were denied permission to travel by the Malaysian government. They were considered to have withdrawn from the competition, and all previous matches played by them shall be considered "null and void" and would not be considered in determining the final group rankings.)	~~1 Dec~~	~~2–1~~	~~19 Nov~~	—

Source: AFC
Rules for classification: Tiebreakers
Notes:

19 November 2020 2	Johor Darul Ta'zim (Malaysia)	Cancelled	(China) Guangzhou Evergrande	Doha, Qatar
16:00 UTC+3				Stadium: Khalifa International Stadium

22 November 2020 1	Suwon Samsung Bluewings (South Korea)	0–0	(China) Guangzhou Evergrande	Doha, Qatar
13:00 UTC+3	Jeong Sang-bin (yellow card) 83'; Jang Ho-ik (yellow card) 90'	Report	Yang Liyu (yellow card) 48'	Stadium: Khalifa International Stadium; Referee: Chris Beath (Australia); Assistant referees: Anton Shchetinin (Australia), George Lakrindis (Australia); Fourth official: Muhammad Taqi (Singapore)

25 November 2020 3	Guangzhou Evergrande (China)	1–3	(Japan) Vissel Kobe	Doha, Qatar
13:00 UTC+3	Luo Guofu (yellow card) 41'; Furuhashi 55' (o.g.)	Report	Furuhashi 44'; Douglas 74'; Iniesta 84'	Stadium: Khalifa International Stadium; Referee: Nawaf Shukralla (Bahrain); Assistant referees: Mohamed Salman (Bahrain), Abdulla Alrowaimi (Bahrain); Fourth official: Hanna Hattab (Syria)

28 November 2020 4	Vissel Kobe (Japan)	0–2	(China) Guangzhou Evergrande	Al Wakrah, Qatar
13:00 UTC+3		Report	Park Ji-soo (yellow card) 12'; Talisca 17' (pen.); Ai Kesen 36'; Zhong Yihao (yellow card) 47'	Stadium: Al Janoub Stadium; Referee: Alireza Faghani (Iran); Assistant referees: Mohammadreza Mansouri (Iran), Mohammadreza Abolfazli (Iran); Fourth official: Mooud Bonyadifar (Iran)

1 December 2020 5	Guangzhou Evergrande (China)	1–1	(South Korea) Suwon Samsung Bluewings	Doha, Qatar
13:00 UTC+3	Zhong Yihao (yellow card) 42' (yellow card) 74' (yellow-red card); Zhang Xiuwei (yellow card) 54'; Wei Shihao (yellow card) 54' (goal) 72'	Report	Lim Sang-hyub 53'; Ko Seung-beom (yellow card) 54'	Stadium: Khalifa International Stadium; Referee: Adham Makhadmeh (Jordan); Assistant referees: Ahmad Alroalle (Jordan), Mohammad Alkalaf (Jordan); Fourth official: Mohanad Qasim Sarray (Iraq)

4 December 2020 6	Guangzhou Evergrande (China)	Cancelled	(Malaysia) Johor Darul Ta'zim	Al Wakrah, Qatar
16:00 UTC+3				Stadium: Al Janoub Stadium

== Statistics ==
As of 1 December 2020

=== Appearances and goals ===
No.	Pos.	Player	Super League			FA Cup			Champions League			Total		
No.	Pos.	Player	Apps.	Starts	Goals	Apps.	Starts	Goals	Apps.	Starts	Goals	Apps.	Starts	Goals
2	DF	(China) Jiang Guangtai	17	16	0	0	0	0	4	3	0	21	19	0
3	DF	(China) Mei Fang	10	9	0	1	1	0	4	4	0	15	14	0
5	DF	(China) Zhang Linpeng	17	17	1	0	0	0	2	2	0	19	19	1
6	MF	(China) Liao Lisheng	8	4	0	1	1	0	3	3	0	12	8	0
7	FW	(China) Wei Shihao	10	6	8	0	0	0	4	3	1	14	9	9
8	MF	(Brazil) Paulinho	20	20	12	0	0	0	0	0	0	20	20	12
9	FW	(China) Ai Kesen	19	15	6	0	0	0	4	3	1	23	18	7
10	MF	(China) Zheng Zhi	13	9	0	0	0	0	0	0	0	13	9	0
11	MF	(China) Zhang Xiuwei	11	6	0	1	1	0	3	3	0	15	10	0
12	MF	(China) Xu Xin	14	5	0	0	0	0	2	1	0	16	6	0
13	GK	(China) Liu Weiguo	1	1	0	1	1	0	0	0	0	2	2	0
14	MF	(China) Tan Kaiyuan	2	0	0	1	1	1	0	0	0	3	1	1
15	MF	(China) Yan Dinghao	11	4	0	1	1	0	1	1	0	13	6	0
16	MF	(China) Huang Bowen	8	3	0	0	0	0	2	0	0	10	3	0
17	FW	(China) Yang Liyu	18	13	0	1	0	0	4	3	0	23	16	0
19	FW	(China) Fei Nanduo	16	10	5	0	0	0	1	0	0	17	10	5
20	FW	(China) Luo Guofu	5	1	0	1	1	1	3	1	0	9	3	1
21	DF	(China) Gao Zhunyi	11	11	1	0	0	0	0	0	0	11	11	1
22	FW	(China) Parmanjan Kyum	4	0	0	1	0	0	0	0	0	5	0	0
23	DF	(South Korea) Park Ji-soo	18	18	0	1	0	0	3	3	0	22	21	0
24	DF	(China) Wang Shilong	2	0	0	1	0	0	1	0	0	4	0	0
25	DF	(China) Deng Hanwen	4	1	0	1	1	0	1	0	0	6	2	0
26	MF	(Brazil) Talisca	17	15	6	0	0	0	3	3	1	20	18	7
27	DF	(China) Wu Shaocong	9	7	1	1	1	0	2	0	0	12	8	1
28	MF	(China) Gao Late	0	0	0	0	0	0	4	2	0	4	2	0
32	GK	(China) Liu Dianzuo	19	19	0	0	0	0	4	4	0	23	23	0
33	MF	(China) Zhong Yihao	11	1	0	1	1	0	4	2	0	16	4	0
35	DF	(China) Li Xuepeng	3	0	0	0	0	0	0	0	0	3	0	0
36	MF	(China) He Chao	15	9	1	1	1	0	2	1	0	18	11	1
38	DF	(China) Liu Yiming	0	0	0	0	0	0	2	2	0	2	2	0
40	FW	(China) Li Canming	0	0	0	1	0	0	0	0	0	1	0	0
41	FW	(China) Chen Junzhou	0	0	0	1	1	0	0	0	0	1	1	0
42	DF	(China) Zhang Zhihao	0	0	0	1	1	0	0	0	0	1	1	0
43	DF	(China) Liao Jintao	0	0	0	1	1	0	0	0	0	1	1	0
45	DF	(China) Huang Guangliang	0	0	0	1	1	0	0	0	0	1	1	0
46	DF	(China) Zhao Wenzhe	0	0	0	1	1	0	0	0	0	1	1	0
48	DF	(China) Fan Ruiwei	0	0	0	1	0	0	0	0	0	1	0	0
50	GK	(China) Li Weijie	0	0	0	1	1	0	0	0	0	1	1	0
51	MF	(China) Li Jiaheng	0	0	0	1	0	0	0	0	0	1	0	0
53	MF	(China) He Xinjie	0	0	0	1	0	0	0	0	0	1	0	0
54	MF	(China) Zhang Yujie	0	0	0	1	1	0	0	0	0	1	1	0
55	MF	(China) Ruan Sai	0	0	0	1	1	0	0	0	0	1	1	0
56	DF	(China) Jiang Weilang	0	0	0	1	0	0	0	0	0	1	0	0
57	DF	(China) Wang Tianqing	0	0	0	1	1	0	0	0	0	1	1	0
58	FW	(China) Wu Junjie	0	0	0	1	1	0	0	0	0	1	1	0
60	MF	(China) Bughrahan Skandar	1	0	0	2	1	0	0	0	0	3	1	0
TOTALS					41			2			3			46

=== Goalscorers ===
Rank	Player	No.	Pos.	Super League	FA Cup	Champions League	Total
1	(Brazil) Paulinho	8	MF	12	0	0	12
2	(China) Wei Shihao	7	FW	8	0	1	9
3	(China) Ai Kesen	9	FW	6	0	1	7
3	(Brazil) Talisca	26	MF	6	0	1	7
5	(China) Fei Nanduo	19	FW	5	0	0	5
6	(China) Zhang Linpeng	5	DF	1	0	0	1
6	(China) Tan Kaiyuan	14	MF	0	1	0	1
6	(China) Luo Guofu	20	FW	0	1	0	1
6	(China) Gao Zhunyi	21	DF	1	0	0	1
6	(China) Wu Shaocong	27	DF	1	0	0	1
6	(China) He Chao	36	MF	1	0	0	1
Own goals				2	0	1	3
TOTALS				43	2	4	49

=== Disciplinary record ===
No.	Pos.	Player	Super League			FA Cup			Champions League			Total		
No.	Pos.	Player	Booked	(yellow card) (yellow-red card)	Sent off (straight red)	Booked	(yellow card) (yellow-red card)	Sent off (straight red)	Booked	(yellow card) (yellow-red card)	Sent off (straight red)	Booked	(yellow card) (yellow-red card)	Sent off (straight red)
2	DF	(China) Jiang Guangtai	1	0	0	0	0	0	0	0	0	1	0	0
3	DF	(China) Mei Fang	4	0	0	0	0	0	0	0	0	4	0	0
5	DF	(China) Zhang Linpeng	1	1	0	0	0	0	0	0	0	1	1	0
6	MF	(China) Liao Lisheng	2	0	0	0	0	0	0	0	0	2	0	0
7	FW	(China) Wei Shihao	3	0	0	0	0	0	1	0	0	4	0	0
8	MF	(Brazil) Paulinho	1	0	0	0	0	0	0	0	0	1	0	0
10	MF	(China) Zheng Zhi	4	0	0	0	0	0	0	0	0	4	0	0
11	MF	(China) Zhang Xiuwei	3	0	0	0	0	0	1	0	0	4	0	0
12	MF	(China) Xu Xin	1	0	0	0	0	0	0	0	0	1	0	0
15	MF	(China) Yan Dinghao	1	0	0	0	0	0	0	0	0	1	0	0
16	MF	(China) Huang Bowen	2	0	0	0	0	0	0	0	0	2	0	0
17	FW	(China) Yang Liyu	3	0	0	0	0	0	1	0	0	4	0	0
20	FW	(China) Luo Guofu	0	0	1	0	0	0	1	0	0	1	0	1
21	DF	(China) Gao Zhunyi	2	0	0	0	0	0	0	0	0	2	0	0
23	DF	(South Korea) Park Ji-soo	4	0	0	0	0	0	1	0	0	5	0	0
25	DF	(China) Deng Hanwen	1	0	0	0	0	0	0	0	0	1	0	0
26	MF	(Brazil) Talisca	1	0	0	0	0	0	0	0	0	1	0	0
27	DF	(China) Wu Shaocong	1	0	0	0	0	0	0	0	0	1	0	0
32	GK	(China) Liu Dianzuo	2	0	0	0	0	0	0	0	0	2	0	0
33	MF	(China) Zhong Yihao	0	0	0	0	0	0	1	1	0	1	1	0
36	MF	(China) He Chao	4	0	1	0	0	0	0	0	0	4	0	1
46	DF	(China) Zhao Wenzhe	0	0	0	1	0	0	0	0	0	1	0	0
TOTALS			41	1	2	1	0	0	6	1	0	48	2	2
