= 2019 Guangzhou Evergrande Taobao F.C. season =

Guangzhou Evergrande Taobao
- Chairman: Gao Han
- Manager: Fabio Cannavaro
- Stadium: Tianhe Stadium
- Super League: 1st
- FA Cup: Quarter-finals
- AFC Champions League: Semi-finals
- Top goalscorer: League: Paulinho (19); All: Paulinho (22)
- Highest home attendance: 49,973 vs Shanghai SIPG; 23 November 2019 (Super League)
- Lowest home attendance: 19,732 vs Beijing Renhe; 29 May 2019 (FA Cup)
- Average home league attendance: league: 45,795 all: 43,240
Home colours	Away colours

The 2019 Guangzhou Evergrande Taobao season is the 66th year in Guangzhou Evergrande's existence and its 52nd season in the Chinese football league, also its 30th season in the top flight.

== Transfers ==
=== In ===
==== Winter ====
Squad number	Position	Player	Age	Moving from	Type	Transfer fee	Date	Source
9	MF	(Brazil) Talisca	24	(Portugal) Benfica	Transfer	€ 19.2 million	26 October 2018	
	DF	(China) Liu Hao	22	(China) Guizhou Hengfeng	Transfer	Free	1 January 2019	
	DF	(China) Zhou Wenxin	21	(China) Shenzhen Pengcheng	Transfer	Free	1 January 2019	
	DF	(China) Wu Yue	20	(China) Shenzhen Pengcheng	Transfer	Free	1 January 2019	
	DF	(China) Liu Haidong	23	(China) Hainan Boying	Transfer	Free	1 January 2019	
	MF	(China) Chen Zijie	21	(China) Yinchuan Helanshan	Loan return	-	1 January 2019	
	GK	(China) Fang Zihong	20	(China) Inner Mongolia Zhongyou	Loan return	-	1 January 2019	
	DF	(China) Guan Haojin	23	(China) Yinchuan Helanshan	Loan return	-	1 January 2019	
	MF	(China) Li Geng	21	(China) Dalian Transcendence	Loan return	-	1 January 2019	
	DF	(China) Liu Ruicheng	19	(China) Inner Mongolia Zhongyou	Loan return	-	1 January 2019	
	DF	(China) Rong Hao	31	(China) Shanghai Greenland Shenhua	Loan return	-	1 January 2019	
	FW	(China) Wang Jingbin	23	(China) Shanghai Shenxin	Loan return	-	1 January 2019	
	DF	(China) Wang Shangyuan	25	(China) Henan Jianye	Loan return	-	1 January 2019	
	DF	(China) Yang Zhaohui	20	(South Korea) Busan FC	Loan return	-	1 January 2019	
	FW	(China) Ye Guochen	22	(China) Yinchuan Helanshan	Loan return	-	1 January 2019	
	MF	(China) Zhang Jiaqi	27	(China) Guangzhou R&F	Loan return	-	1 January 2019	
8	MF	(Brazil) Paulinho	30	(Spain) Barcelona	Transfer	€ 42 million	15 January 2019	
	FW	(Peru) Roberto Siucho	21	(Peru) Universitario	Transfer	$ 1 million	31 January 2019	
21	DF	(China) Gao Zhunyi	23	Hebei China Fortune	Transfer	Undisclosed	2 February 2019	
	DF	(China) Wu Shaocong	18	(Japan) Shimizu S-Pulse	Transfer	Undisclosed	2 February 2019	
7	FW	(China) Wei Shihao	23	(China) Beijing Sinobo Guoan	Transfer	Undisclosed	2 February 2019	
2	DF	(China) Liu Yiming	23	(China) Tianjin Tianhai	Transfer	Undisclosed	7 February 2019	
11	MF	(China) Zhang Xiuwei	22	(China) Tianjin Tianhai	Transfer	Undisclosed	7 February 2019	
13	MF	(China) He Chao	23	(China) Changchun Yatai	Transfer	Undisclosed	7 February 2019	
4	DF	(England) Tyias Browning	24	(England) Everton	Transfer	Undisclosed	20 February 2019	
23	DF	(South Korea) Park Ji-soo	24	(South Korea) Gyeongnam FC	Transfer	Undisclosed	20 February 2019	
15	MF	(China) Yan Dinghao	20	(Portugal) Gondomar	Loan	Undisclosed	28 February 2019	

==== Summer ====
Squad number	Position	Player	Age	Moving from	Type	Transfer fee	Date	Source
	FW	(Colombia) Jackson Martínez	32	(Portugal) Portimonense	Loan return	-	30 June 2019	
	MF	(Serbia) Nemanja Gudelj	27	(Portugal) Sporting CP	Loan return	-	30 June 2019	
18	FW	(Brazil) Elkeson	29	(China) Shanghai SIPG	Transfer	Undisclosed	9 July 2019	
27	DF	(China) Wu Shaocong	19	(Japan) Kyoto Sanga	Loan return	-	22 July 2019	
	MF	(China) Zheng Long	31	(China) Dalian Yifang	Loan return	-	31 July 2019	

=== Out ===
==== Winter ====
Squad number	Position	Player	Age	Moving to	Type	Transfer fee	Date	Source
24	MF	(Brazil) Talisca	24	(Portugal) Benfica	Loan return	-	26 October 2018	
9	MF	(Brazil) Paulinho	30	(Spain) Barcelona	Loan return	-	15 January 2019	
11	MF	(Brazil) Ricardo Goulart	27	(Brazil) Palmeiras	Loan	Undisclosed	15 January 2019	
28	DF	(South Korea) Kim Young-gwon	28	(Japan) Gamba Osaka	Transfer	Undisclosed	26 January 2019	
7	FW	(Brazil) Alan Carvalho	29	(China) Tianjin Tianhai	Loan	Free (part of Liu Yiming and Zhang Xiuwei's transfer deal)	7 February 2019	
21	DF	(China) Zhang Chenglin	32	(China) Tianjin Tianhai	Loan	Free (part of Liu Yiming and Zhang Xiuwei's transfer deal)	7 February 2019	
2	MF	(China) Liao Lisheng	25	(China) Tianjin Tianhai	Loan	Free (part of Liu Yiming and Zhang Xiuwei's transfer deal)	7 February 2019	
42	DF	(China) Wen Jiabao	20	(China) Tianjin Tianhai	Loan	Free (part of Liu Yiming and Zhang Xiuwei's transfer deal)	7 February 2019	
	FW	(China) Shewket Yalqun	26	(China) Xinjiang Tianshan Leopard	Loan	Undisclosed	22 February 2019	
27	MF	(China) Zheng Long	30	(China) Dalian Yifang	Loan	Undisclosed	26 February 2019	
	MF	(China) Dilyimit Tudi	20	(China) Xinjiang Tianshan Leopard	Transfer	Undisclosed	26 February 2019	
15	MF	(China) Zhang Wenzhao	31	(China) Beijing Renhe	Loan	Undisclosed	27 February 2019	
36	MF	(China) Deng Yubiao	21	Guangdong South China Tiger	Loan	Undisclosed	27 February 2019	
68	FW	(China) Yang Chaosheng	25	(China) Changchun Yatai	Transfer	Free (part of He Chao's transfer deal)	28 February 2019	
63	MF	(China) Ju Feng	24	(China) Changchun Yatai	Loan	Free (part of He Chao's transfer deal)	28 February 2019	
25	DF	(China) Zou Zheng	31	(China) Guangzhou R&F	Transfer	Undisclosed	28 February 2019	
12	DF	(China) Wang Shangyuan	25	(China) Henan Jianye	Transfer	Undisclosed	28 February 2019	
14	DF	(China) Rong Hao	31	(China) Tianjin TEDA	Loan	Undisclosed	28 February 2019	
	DF	(China) Liu Ruicheng	19	(China) Xinjiang Tianshan Leopard	Loan	Undisclosed	28 February 2019	
	MF	(China) Zhang Jiaqi	27	(China) Qingdao Huanghai	Loan	Undisclosed	28 February 2019	
	GK	(China) Li Zhizhao	19	(China) Qingdao Huanghai	Transfer	Undisclosed	28 February 2019	
	MF	(China) Lu Haolin	20	(China) Qingdao Huanghai	Transfer	Undisclosed	28 February 2019	
	DF	(China) Liu Hao	23	(China) Sichuan Longfor	Transfer	Undisclosed	28 February 2019	
61	GK	(China) Liu Weiguo	26	(China) Inner Mongolia Zhongyou	Loan	Undisclosed	28 February 2019	
18	DF	(China) Guo Jing	22	(China) Inner Mongolia Zhongyou	Loan	Undisclosed	28 February 2019	
58	FW	(China) Wang Jinze	19	(China) Inner Mongolia Zhongyou	Loan	Undisclosed	28 February 2019	
47	DF	(China) Chen Zepeng	22	(China) Beijing BSU	Loan	Undisclosed	28 February 2019	
	GK	(China) Li Weijie	18	(China) Shanghai Shenxin	Loan	Free	28 February 2019	
	FW	(Peru) Roberto Siucho	22	(China) Shanghai Shenxin	Loan	Free	28 February 2019	
	MF	(China) Erxat Tuhtahun	20	(China) Shenzhen	Transfer	Free	28 February 2019	
	FW	(China) Jia Bingrui	19	(China) Shenzhen	Transfer	Free	28 February 2019	
56	MF	(China) Li Zhongyi	21	(China) Zibo Cuju	Transfer	Undisclosed	1 March 2019	
	DF	(China) Wu Yue	20	(China) Zibo Cuju	Loan	Undisclosed	1 March 2019	
	GK	(China) Fang Zihong	21	(China) Chengdu Better City	Transfer	Undisclosed	1 March 2019	
	DF	(China) Gong Liangxuan	25	(China) Shenzhen Pengcheng	Transfer	Undisclosed	1 March 2019	
	FW	(China) Ye Guochen	22	(China) Wuhan Three Towns	Loan	Undisclosed	1 March 2019	
	DF	(China) Guan Haojin	23	(China) Hebei Aoli Jingying	Loan	Undisclosed	1 March 2019	
	DF	(China) Wu Shaocong	19	(Japan) Kyoto Sanga	Loan	Undisclosed	29 March 2019	

==== Summer ====
Squad number	Position	Player	Age	Moving to	Type	Transfer fee	Date	Source
	DF	(China) Ma Sheng	20	(China) Shanxi Metropolis	Transfer	Undisclosed	4 July 2019	
37	MF	(China) Cai Mingmin	18	(China) Kunshan	Loan	Undisclosed	5 July 2019	
13	MF	(China) He Chao	24	(China) Jiangsu Suning	Loan	Undisclosed	9 July 2019	
26	DF	(China) Hu Ruibao	22	(China) Henan Jianye	Loan	Undisclosed	11 July 2019	
	MF	(China) Wang Junhui	24	(China) Liaoning	Loan	Undisclosed	12 July 2019	
2	DF	(China) Liu Yiming	24	(China) Shenzhen	Loan	Undisclosed	19 July 2019	
	MF	(Serbia) Nemanja Gudelj	27	(Spain) Sevilla	Released	-	23 July 2019	
	MF	(China) Zheng Long	31	(China) Dalian Yifang	Transfer	Undisclosed	31 July 2019	
	FW	(Colombia) Jackson Martínez	32	(Portugal) Portimonense	Loan	-	16 August 2019	

== Pre-season and friendlies ==
=== Training matches ===
Date	Opponents	H / A	Result	Scorers
2019-01-25	(Slovakia) Žilina	N	0–2	/ Mihalík (20', pen.), Boženík (71')
2019-01-29	(Latvia) Riga	N	1–1	Alan (16') / Lemajić (6')
2019-02-01	(Belarus) Dynamo Brest	N	0–2	/ Fameyeh (20'), Bykov (49')
2019-02-15	(China) Henan Jianye	N	2–1	Paulinho, Talisca / Lu Yao
2019-02-22	(China) Beijing Renhe	H	3–1	Paulinho (2), Talisca / Nizamdin
2019-07-09	Philippines	H	0–0	

== Competitions ==
Win Draw Loss

=== Chinese Super League ===
==== Table ====
Pos	Team	Pld	W	D	L	GF	GA	GD	Pts	Qualification or relegation
1	Guangzhou Evergrande Taobao (C)	30	23	3	4	68	24	+44	72	Qualification for AFC Champions League group stage
2	Beijing Sinobo Guoan	30	23	1	6	60	26	+34	70	Qualification for AFC Champions League group stage
3	Shanghai SIPG	30	20	6	4	62	26	+36	66	Qualification for AFC Champions League play-off round
4	Jiangsu Suning	30	15	8	7	60	41	+19	53	
5	Shandong Luneng Taishan	30	15	6	9	55	35	+20	51	

Source: CSL
Rules for classification:
- During season: 1) Points; 2) Goal difference; 3) Goals scored.
- After season: 1) Points; 2) Head-to-head points; 3) Head-to-head goal difference; 4) Head-to-head goals scored; 5) Scores of the weight ratio of the reserve league and youth leagues.
  (C) Champions

==== Results by round ====
Round	1	2	3	4	5	6	7	8	9	10	11	12	13	14	15	16	17	18	19	20	21	23	22	24	25	26	27	28	29	30
Ground	H	H	A	H	A	H	A	H	H	A	H	A	A	H	A	A	A	H	A	H	A	A	H	A	H	A	H	H	A	H
Result	W	W	W	W	L	W	W	L	D	W	W	W	W	W	W	W	W	W	W	W	W	W	D	L	L	W	D	W	W	W
Position	2	3	3	2	3	2	2	3	3	3	3	3	2	3	2	2	2	2	1	1	1	1	1	1	1	1	1	1	1	1

Updated to match(es) played on 1 December 2019. Source: Chinese Super League Table (in Chinese)
A = Away; H = Home; W = Win; D = Draw; L = Loss; P = Postponed

==== Results summary ====
Overall								Home						Away					
Pld	W	D	L	GF	GA	GD	Pts	W	D	L	GF	GA	GD	W	D	L	GF	GA	GD
30	23	3	4	68	24	+44	72	10	3	2	28	10	+18	13	0	2	40	14	+26

Last updated: 1 December 2019.
Source: Competitive Matches

==== Matches ====
1 March 2019 1	Guangzhou Evergrande Taobao	3–0	Tianjin Tianhai	Guangzhou
19:35 UTC+8	Zhang Linpeng (yellow card) 12' (yellow-red card) 26'; Wei Shihao 23'; Fang Jingqi 36' (o.g.); Feng Xiaoting 66'		Wang Yongpo (yellow card) 70'	Stadium: Tianhe Stadium; Attendance: 47,692; Referee: Mark Clattenburg (England); Assistant referees: Xi Fei, Shen Pengxiang; Fourth official: Huang Yejun

8 March 2019 2	Guangzhou Evergrande Taobao	1–0	Tianjin TEDA	Guangzhou
19:35 UTC+8	Paulinho 18'; He Chao (yellow card) 37'; Liu Yiming (yellow card) 58'		Zhao Honglüe (yellow card) 16'; Acheampong (yellow card) 22'; Tan Wangsong (yellow card) 39'; Bastians (yellow card) 74'; Wang Zhenghao (yellow card) 87'	Stadium: Tianhe Stadium; Attendance: 28,973; Referee: Ma Ning; Assistant referees: Shi Xiang, Ma Kexi; Fourth official: Niu Minghui

30 March 2019 3	Dalian Yifang	0–1	Guangzhou Evergrande Taobao	Dalian
16:00 UTC+8	Zheng Long (yellow card) 6'		Talisca 80'; Paulinho (yellow card) 85'	Stadium: Dalian Sports Center Stadium; Attendance: 48,919; Referee: Wang Di; Assistant referees: Sun Kai, Hu Chengjun; Fourth official: He Xiaohu

6 April 2019 4	Guangzhou Evergrande Taobao	2–0	Guangzhou R&F	Guangzhou
19:35 UTC+8	Talisca 13', 61'; Zheng Zhi (yellow card) 84'			Stadium: Tianhe Stadium; Attendance: 49,531; Referee: Mark Clattenburg (England); Assistant referees: Song Xiangyun, Shen Pengxiang; Fourth official: Ai Kun

14 April 2019 5	Beijing Renhe	2–1	Guangzhou Evergrande Taobao	Beijing
15:30 UTC+8	Luo Xin (yellow card) 26'; Diop 45'; Cao Yongjing (yellow card) 88'; Chen Jie 90+2'		Paulinho (red card) 15'; Yang Liyu 28'; Talisca (yellow card) 73'	Stadium: Beijing Fengtai Stadium; Attendance: 10,137; Referee: Wang Di; Assistant referees: Shi Xiang, Yu Yue; Fourth official: Wu Liying

19 April 2019 6	Guangzhou Evergrande Taobao	2–1	Shandong Luneng Taishan	Guangzhou
19:35 UTC+8	Talisca 19', 90+5'; Zhang Xiuwei (yellow card) 59'		Pellè 44'; Chen Kerui (yellow card) 61'; Fellaini (yellow card) 68'	Stadium: Tianhe Stadium; Attendance: 43,986; Referee: Milorad Mažić (Serbia); Assistant referees: Song Xiangyun, Yang Yang; Fourth official: Shi Zhenlu

28 April 2019 7	Chongqing SWM	0–1	Guangzhou Evergrande Taobao	Chongqing
19:00 UTC+8	Luo Hao (yellow card) 61'; Feng Jing (yellow card) 62'		Talisca 45+1'	Stadium: Chongqing Olympic Sports Center; Attendance: 41,892; Referee: Zhang Lei; Assistant referees: Zhou Fei, Zhang Cheng; Fourth official: He Xiaohu

4 May 2019 8	Guangzhou Evergrande Taobao	0–1	Beijing Sinobo Guoan	Guangzhou
19:35 UTC+8			Viera 64'; Zou Dehai (yellow card) 90+5'	Stadium: Tianhe Stadium; Attendance: 45,894; Referee: Mark Clattenburg (England); Assistant referees: Wang Dexin, Hu Chengjun; Fourth official: Wu Liying

12 May 2019 9	Guangzhou Evergrande Taobao	2–2	Jiangsu Suning	Guangzhou
19:35 UTC+8	Feng Xiaoting (yellow card) 10'; Gao Lin 24'; Wei Shihao 90+2' (pen.)		Éder (yellow card) 29' (goal) 66'; Ye Chongqiu (yellow card) 38'; Xie Pengfei (yellow card) 44'; Teixeira 73'; Abduhamit (yellow card) 90+1'	Stadium: Tianhe Stadium; Attendance: 46,139; Referee: Petr Ardeleanu (Czech Republic); Assistant referees: Huo Weiming, Liu Jinyu; Fourth official: Huang Yejun

17 May 2019 10	Wuhan Zall	2–3	Guangzhou Evergrande Taobao	Wuhan
19:35 UTC+8	Kouassi 16', 90+6' (pen.)		Zheng Zhi (yellow card) 28'; Li Xuepeng (yellow card) 36'; Liu Yiming (yellow card) 44'; Zhong Yihao 52'; Talisca 64'; Paulinho 82'	Stadium: Dongxihu Sports Centre; Attendance: 23,177; Referee: Zhang Lei; Assistant referees: Sun Kai, Yu Yue; Fourth official: Guan Xing

26 May 2019 11	Guangzhou Evergrande Taobao	1–0	Shenzhen Kaisa	Guangzhou
17:30 UTC+8	Xu Xin (yellow card) 37'; Wei Shihao 56'; Liu Dianzuo (yellow card) 90+5'		Wang Peng (yellow card) 45+2'	Stadium: Tianhe Stadium; Attendance: 46,124; Referee: Mark Clattenburg (England); Assistant referees: Zhang Cheng, Yang Yang; Fourth official: Huang Yi

2 June 2019 12	Henan Jianye	2–5	Guangzhou Evergrande Taobao	Zhengzhou
19:35 UTC+8	Feng Zhuoyi (yellow card) 18'; Bassogog 72'; Chen Hao 88'		Yang Liyu 9'; Paulinho 12'; Zheng Zhi (yellow card) 45+1'; Gu Cao 51' (o.g.); Zhong Yihao 62'; Yan Dinghao 89'	Stadium: Zhengzhou Hanghai Stadium; Attendance: 21,936; Referee: Ma Ning; Assistant referees: Ma Ji, Ma Kexi; Fourth official: Kou Jianxun

14 June 2019 13	Shanghai SIPG	0–2	Guangzhou Evergrande Taobao	Shanghai
20:00 UTC+8	Yang Shiyuan (yellow card) 53'; Hulk (yellow card) after match		Paulinho 43', 90+5'; Xu Xin (yellow card) 81'	Stadium: Shanghai Stadium; Attendance: 25,227; Referee: Milorad Mažić (Serbia); Assistant referees: Song Xiangyun, Sun Kai; Fourth official: Liu Wei

22 June 2019 14	Guangzhou Evergrande Taobao	2–1	Hebei China Fortune	Guangzhou
19:35 UTC+8	Yan Dinghao 8'; Wei Shihao 60'; He Chao (yellow card) 63'		Wang Qiuming (yellow card) 22'; Zhang Junzhe (yellow card) 52'; Marcão 69'	Stadium: Tianhe Stadium; Attendance: 47,539; Referee: Zhang Lei; Assistant referees: Wang Dexin, Yu Yue; Fourth official: Fu Ming

1 July 2019 15	Shanghai Greenland Shenhua	0–3	Guangzhou Evergrande Taobao	Shanghai
19:35 UTC+8	Guarín (yellow card) 26'		Gao Zhunyi (yellow card) 8'; Yan Dinghao 12' (yellow card) 24'; Wei Shihao 37', 51'; Yang Liyu (yellow card) 75'	Stadium: Hongkou Football Stadium; Attendance: 21,688; Referee: Ma Ning; Assistant referees: Ma Ji, Xi Fei; Fourth official: Huang Yi

5 July 2019 16	Tianjin Tianhai	1–3	Guangzhou Evergrande Taobao	Tianjin
19:35 UTC+8	Yang Xu 5'		Yan Dinghao 16'; Park Ji-soo (yellow card) 33'; Gao Zhunyi (yellow card) 48'; Paulinho 68'; Liu Shibo (yellow card) 89'; Xu Xin 90+2'	Stadium: Tianjin Olympic Center; Attendance: 16,759; Referee: Milorad Mažić (Serbia); Assistant referees: Huo Weiming, Shen Pengxiang; Fourth official: Jin Jingyuan

11 July 2019 17	Tianjin TEDA	0–3	Guangzhou Evergrande Taobao	Tianjin
20:00 UTC+8	Wagner (yellow card) 55'; Yang Fan (yellow card) 78'; Guo Hao (yellow card) 90+1'		Zhang Linpeng (yellow card) 9'; Zheng Zhi (yellow card) 24'; Wei Shihao (yellow card) 30'; Yang Liyu 34'; Elkeson 65'; Yan Dinghao (yellow card) 67'; Park Ji-soo (yellow card) 76'; Xu Xin (yellow card) 83'; Paulinho (yellow card) 88' (goal) 90+4'	Stadium: Tianjin Olympic Center; Attendance: 16,918; Referee: Ai Kun; Assistant referees: Shi Xiang, Yang Yang; Fourth official: Ma Li

16 July 2019 18	Guangzhou Evergrande Taobao	4–1	Dalian Yifang	Guangzhou
20:00 UTC+8	Paulinho 27', 83', 90+1'; Li Xuepeng (yellow card) 72'; Elkeson 90+3'		Qin Sheng 11'; Boateng (yellow card) 50'; Carrasco (yellow card) 53'; Shan Pengfei (yellow card) 77'	Stadium: Tianhe Stadium; Attendance: 48,419; Referee: Nawaf Shukralla (Bahrain); Assistant referees: Cao Yi, Tang Rongdi; Fourth official: Wang Jing

20 July 2019 19	Guangzhou R&F	0–5	Guangzhou Evergrande Taobao	Guangzhou
19:35 UTC+8	Wang Peng (yellow card) 40'		Wei Shihao (penalty missed) 12' (pen.) 13'; Elkeson 42', 78' (pen.), 87'; Paulinho 51'	Stadium: Yuexiushan Stadium; Attendance: 13,516; Referee: Milorad Mažić (Serbia); Assistant referees: Wang Dexin, Hu Chengjun; Fourth official: Lin Jun

28 July 2019 20	Guangzhou Evergrande Taobao	3–0	Beijing Renhe	Guangzhou
19:35 UTC+8	Wei Shihao 2'; Paulinho 44', 49'		Zhang Chenlong (yellow card) 41'; Zhang Yufeng (yellow card) 83'	Stadium: Tianhe Stadium; Attendance: 47,935; Referee: Ma Ning; Assistant referees: Cao Yi, Huang Tao; Fourth official: Gu Chunhan

3 August 2019 21	Shandong Luneng Taishan	0–3	Guangzhou Evergrande Taobao	Jinan
19:35 UTC+8	Pellè (yellow card) 90+3'		Wei Shihao 52'; Elkeson 55'; Paulinho (yellow card) 64' (goal) 89'	Stadium: Jinan Olympic Sports Center; Attendance: 40,117; Referee: Yusuke Araki (Japan); Assistant referees: Sun Kai, Shen Pengxiang; Fourth official: Kou Jianxun

11 August 2019 23	Beijing Sinobo Guoan	1–3	Guangzhou Evergrande Taobao	Beijing
19:35 UTC+8	Zhang Yuning 17'; Augusto (yellow card) 40'; Liu Huan (yellow card) 50'; Yu Dabao (yellow card) 74'		Paulinho 10'; Deng Hanwen (yellow card) 20'; Gao Zhunyi (yellow card) 21'; Elkeson 52'; Yang Liyu 59'	Stadium: Workers' Stadium; Attendance: 57,056; Referee: Matthew Conger (New Zealand); Assistant referees: Wang Dexin, Ma Ji; Fourth official: Zhen Wei

15 August 2019 22	Guangzhou Evergrande Taobao	1–1	Chongqing SWM	Guangzhou
19:35 UTC+8	Talisca 30'; Huang Bowen (yellow card) 60'		Feng Jing 32'; Sui Weijie (yellow card) 71'; Yin Congyao (yellow card) 90+7'	Stadium: Tianhe Stadium; Attendance: 48,473; Referee: Wang Jing; Assistant referees: Sun Kai, Yu Yue; Fourth official: Zhang Lei

13 September 2019 24	Jiangsu Suning	3–1	Guangzhou Evergrande Taobao	Nanjing
19:35 UTC+8	Éder 37' (yellow card) 75'; Teixeira 69'; Tian Yinong (yellow card) 77'; Wu Xi (yellow card) 81'; Wang Song 90+8'		Deng Hanwen (yellow card) 22'; Xu Xin (yellow card) 29'; Miranda 61' (o.g.); Zhong Yihao (yellow card) 90+6'	Stadium: Nanjing Olympic Sports Centre; Attendance: 38,526; Referee: Shi Zhenlu; Assistant referees: Wang Dexin, Hu Chengjun; Fourth official: Tang Shunqi

22 September 2019 25	Guangzhou Evergrande Taobao	0–1	Wuhan Zall	Guangzhou
20:00 UTC+8			Ai Zhibo (yellow card) 40'; Liu Yun 60'; Kouassi (yellow card) 73'	Stadium: Tianhe Stadium; Attendance: 47,392; Referee: Milorad Mažić (Serbia); Assistant referees: Shi Xiang, Guo Jingtao; Fourth official: Xing Qi

18 October 2019 26	Shenzhen Kaisa	2–3	Guangzhou Evergrande Taobao	Shenzhen
19:35 UTC+8	Qiao Wei (yellow card) 10'; Gao Tianyi (yellow card) 22'; Mary 39', 90+5'; Wang Peng (yellow card) 70'		Gao Zhunyi (yellow card) 5'; Elkeson 15', 52'; Paulinho 19'; Zhang Linpeng (yellow card) 45+3'	Stadium: Shenzhen Universiade Sports Centre; Attendance: 25,381; Referee: Zhang Lei; Assistant referees: Song Xiangyun, Shen Pengxiang; Fourth official: Liu Lin

27 October 2019 27	Guangzhou Evergrande Taobao	2–2	Henan Jianye	Guangzhou
19:35 UTC+8	Zhong Yihao (yellow card) 11'; Paulinho 51' (pen.); Wei Shihao 55'; Zhang Linpeng (yellow card) 63'; Yang Liyu (yellow card) 85'		Ivo 2'; Chen Hao (yellow card) 21'; Bassogog 35'; Ke Zhao (yellow card) 47'	Stadium: Tianhe Stadium; Attendance: 39,873; Referee: Wang Jing; Assistant referees: Ma Ji, Huang Tao; Fourth official: Kou Jianxun

23 November 2019 28	Guangzhou Evergrande Taobao	2–0	Shanghai SIPG	Guangzhou
19:35 UTC+8	Zhong Yihao (yellow card) 14'; Talisca 44', 90+5' (pen.); Wei Shihao (yellow card) 67'; Zhang Xiuwei (yellow card) 76'; Mei Fang (yellow card) 90+4'; Huang Bowen (yellow card) 90+6'		Shi Ke (yellow card) 18'; Arnautović (yellow card) 76'; Lin Chuangyi (yellow card) 77'; Oscar (yellow card) 90+3'; Hulk (yellow card) 90+4'	Stadium: Tianhe Stadium; Attendance: 49,973; Referee: Viktor Kassai (Hungary); Assistant referees: György Ring (Hungary), Vencel Tóth (Hungary); Fourth official: Guo Baolong

27 November 2019 29	Hebei China Fortune	1–3	Guangzhou Evergrande Taobao	Langfang
19:35 UTC+8	Russell (yellow card) 57'; Lavezzi 81'		Talisca 12'; Paulinho 41', 58'	Stadium: Langfang Stadium; Attendance: 23,569; Referee: Milorad Mažić (Serbia); Assistant referees: Liu Jinyu, Tang Rongdi; Fourth official: Tang Shunqi

1 December 2019 30	Guangzhou Evergrande Taobao	3–0	Shanghai Greenland Shenhua	Guangzhou
15:00 UTC+8	Wei Shihao 45+3' (yellow card) 45+3'; Park Ji-soo 55'; Zhang Linpeng (yellow card) 69'; Elkeson 83'		Sun Shilin (yellow card) 34'	Stadium: Tianhe Stadium; Attendance: 48,987; Referee: Nawaf Shukralla (Bahrain); Assistant referees: Shi Xiang, Song Xiangyun; Fourth official: Liu Wei

=== Chinese FA Cup ===
1 May 2019 Fourth round	Guangzhou Evergrande Taobao	2–0	Henan Jianye	Guangzhou
19:35 UTC+8	Gao Lin 41'; Feng Boxuan 83'			Stadium: Tianhe Stadium; Attendance: 38,369; Referee: Shi Zhenlu; Assistant referees: Xi Fei, Zhao Wei; Fourth official: Ruan Hua

29 May 2019 Fifth round	Guangzhou Evergrande Taobao	5–0	Beijing Renhe	Guangzhou
19:35 UTC+8	Zhang Linpeng 4'; Yang Liyu 45'; Yan Dinghao (yellow card) 45+1'; Wei Shihao 49', 61', 67' (pen.)		Mou Pengfei (yellow card) 69'	Stadium: Tianhe Stadium; Attendance: 19,732; Referee: Shen Yinhao; Assistant referees: Sun Kai, Xi Fei; Fourth official: He Xiaohu

24 July 2019 Quarter-finals	Guangzhou Evergrande Taobao	0–2	Shanghai SIPG	Guangzhou
20:00 UTC+8	Gao Zhunyi (yellow card) 58'; Park Ji-soo (yellow card) 90+3'		Hulk 13'; Oscar 74'; Yan Junling (yellow card) 83'; Li Shenglong (yellow card) 88'	Stadium: Tianhe Stadium; Attendance: 48,791; Referee: Mark Clattenburg (England); Assistant referees: Huo Weiming, Yu Yue; Fourth official: Fu Ming

=== AFC Champions League ===
==== Group stage ====
Pos	Team	Pld	W	D	L	GF	GA	GD	Pts	Qualification	SAN	GZE	DAE	MVC
1	(Japan) Sanfrecce Hiroshima	6	5	0	1	9	4	+5	15	Advance to knockout stage	—	1–0	2–0	2–1
2	(China) Guangzhou Evergrande	6	3	1	2	9	5	+4	10	Advance to knockout stage	2–0	—	1–0	4–0
3	(South Korea) Daegu FC	6	3	0	3	10	6	+4	9		0–1	3–1	—	4–0
4	(Australia) Melbourne Victory	6	0	1	5	4	17	−13	1		1–3	1–1	1–3	—

Source: AFC
Rules for classification: Group stage tiebreakers

5 March 2019 1	Guangzhou Evergrande (China)	2–0	(Japan) Sanfrecce Hiroshima	Guangzhou, China
20:00 UTC+8	Talisca 19'; Paulinho 26'	Report	Ibayashi (yellow card) 23'; Araki (yellow card) 60'	Stadium: Tianhe Stadium; Attendance: 48,216; Referee: Abdulrahman Al-Jassim (Qatar); Assistant referees: Saoud Ahmed Almaqaleh (Qatar), Taleb Salem Al-Marri (Qatar); Fourth official: Saoud Ali Al-Adba (Qatar)

12 March 2019 2	Daegu FC (South Korea)	3–1	(China) Guangzhou Evergrande	Daegu, South Korea
19:30 UTC+9	Edgar 24', 43'; Kim Dae-won 81'	Report	Wei Shihao (yellow card) 49'; Talisca 53' (yellow card) 86'; Huang Bowen (yellow card) 74'	Stadium: DGB Daegu Bank Park; Attendance: 11,064; Referee: Khamis Al-Marri (Qatar); Assistant referees: Mohammad Jaber Dharman (Qatar), Hamed Talib Saif Al-Ghafri (Oman); Fourth official: C. R. Srikrishna (India)

10 April 2019 3	Guangzhou Evergrande (China)	4–0	(Australia) Melbourne Victory	Guangzhou, China
20:00 UTC+8	Talisca 6', 10'; He Chao (yellow card) 21'; Yang Liyu 42'; Broxham 73' (o.g.)	Report	Broxham (yellow card) 72'	Stadium: Tianhe Stadium; Attendance: 37,531; Referee: Ammar Al-Jeneibi (United Arab Emirates); Assistant referees: Ahmed Al-Rashdi (United Arab Emirates), Jasem Al-Ali (United Arab Emirates); Fourth official: Yaqoub Al-Hammadi (United Arab Emirates)

23 April 2019 4	Melbourne Victory (Australia)	1–1	(China) Guangzhou Evergrande	Melbourne, Australia
19:30 UTC+10	Ingham 26'; Roux (yellow card) 63'; Lesiotis (yellow card) 80'	Report	Huang Bowen 24'	Stadium: Melbourne Rectangular Stadium; Attendance: 10,041; Referee: Nawaf Shukralla (Bahrain); Assistant referees: Yaser Tulefat (Bahrain), Mohamed Jaafar Mohamed Salman (Bahrain); Fourth official: Ismaeel Habib Ali (Bahrain)

8 May 2019 5	Sanfrecce Hiroshima (Japan)	1–0	(China) Guangzhou Evergrande	Hiroshima, Japan
19:00 UTC+9	Sasaki 15'; Higashi (yellow card) 60'; Morishima (yellow card) 83'	Report	Park Ji-soo (yellow card) 32'; Zhang Linpeng (yellow card) 55'; Gao Lin (yellow card) 62'	Stadium: Hiroshima Big Arch; Attendance: 4,302; Referee: Alireza Faghani (Iran); Assistant referees: Mohammad Reza Mansouri (Iran), Mohammadreza Abolfazli (Iran); Fourth official: Payam Heidari (Iran)

22 May 2019 6	Guangzhou Evergrande (China)	1–0	(South Korea) Daegu FC	Guangzhou, China
18:00 UTC+8	Jeong Tae-wook 64' (o.g.); Zheng Zhi (yellow card) 81'	Report	Edgar (yellow card) 34'	Stadium: Tianhe Stadium; Attendance: 38,293; Referee: Mohammed Abdulla Hassan Mohamed (United Arab Emirates); Assistant referees: Mohamed Ahmed Al-Hammadi (United Arab Emirates), Hasan Mohamed Al-Mahri (United Arab Emirates); Fourth official: Omar Mohamed Ahmed Hassan Al-Ali (United Arab Emirates)

==== Knockout stage ====
===== Round of 16 =====
18 June 2019 First leg	Guangzhou Evergrande (China)	2–1	(China) Shandong Luneng	Guangzhou, China
20:00 UTC+8	Wei Shihao 35'; Zheng Zheng 80' (o.g.); Gao Zhunyi (yellow card) 89'	Report	Zhang Chi 66'	Stadium: Tianhe Stadium; Attendance: 38,900; Referee: Hettikamkanamge Perera (Sri Lanka); Assistant referees: Palitha Hemathunga (Sri Lanka), Sanjeewa Wellabada (Sri Lanka); Fourth official: Sivakorn Pu-udom (Thailand)

25 June 2019 Second leg	Shandong Luneng (China)	3–2 (a.e.t.) (5–6 p)	(China) Guangzhou Evergrande	Jinan, China
19:30 UTC+8	Zhou Haibin 62'; Fellaini 70'; Jin Jingdao (yellow card) 90+1'; Liu Junshuai 93'; Dai Lin (yellow card) 101'; Liu Yang (yellow card) 109'	Report	Paulinho 13', 103'; Gao Lin (yellow card) 112'	Stadium: Jinan Olympic Sports Center Stadium; Attendance: 35,148; Referee: Valentin Kovalenko (Uzbekistan); Assistant referees: Andrey Tsapenko (Uzbekistan), Timur Gaynullin (Uzbekistan); Fourth official: Ilgiz Tantashev (Uzbekistan)
	Penalties
	Jin Jingdao (penalty scored); Gil (penalty scored); Fellaini (penalty scored); Hao Junmin (penalty scored); Zhou Haibin (penalty scored); Cui Peng (penalty missed)		(penalty scored) Wei Shihao; (penalty scored) Gao Lin; (penalty scored) Yang Liyu; (penalty scored) Paulinho; (penalty scored) Zhang Linpeng; (penalty scored) Zhong Yihao

4–4 on aggregate. Guangzhou Evergrande won on penalty shoot-out.

===== Quarter-finals =====
28 August 2019 First leg	Guangzhou Evergrande (China)	0–0	(Japan) Kashima Antlers	Guangzhou, China
20:00 UTC+8	Xu Xin (yellow card) 74'	Report	Jung Seung-hyun (yellow card) 63'	Stadium: Tianhe Stadium; Attendance: 39,998; Referee: Abdulrahman Al-Jassim (Qatar); Assistant referees: Taleb Al-Marri (Qatar), Saoud Ahmed Al-Maqaleh (Qatar); Fourth official: Yousuf Al-Shamari (Qatar); Goal-line assistants: Khamis Al-Marri (Qatar), Ko Hyung-jin (South Korea)

18 September 2019 Second leg	Kashima Antlers (Japan)	1–1	(China) Guangzhou Evergrande	Kashima, Japan
19:00 UTC+9	Nagaki (yellow card) 46'; Serginho 51'; Ueda (yellow card) 87'	Report	Huang Bowen (yellow card) 9'; Zheng Zhi (yellow card) 31'; Talisca (yellow card) 34' (goal) 40'; Yang Liyu (yellow card) 42'	Stadium: Kashima Soccer Stadium; Attendance: 13,835; Referee: Ahmed Al-Kaf (Oman); Assistant referees: Abu Bakar Al-Amri (Oman), Rashid Al-Ghaithi (Oman); Fourth official: Ahmad Al-Roalle (Jordan); Goal-line assistants: Adham Makhadmeh (Jordan), Ahmed Al-Ali (Jordan)

1–1 on aggregate. Guangzhou Evergrande won on away goals.

===== Semi-finals =====
2 October 2019 First leg	Urawa Red Diamonds (Japan)	2–0	(China) Guangzhou Evergrande	Saitama, Japan
19:30 UTC+9	Fabrício 19'; Hashioka (yellow card) 59'; Sekine 75'	Report	Park Ji-soo (yellow card) 36'	Stadium: Saitama Stadium 2002; Attendance: 30,068; Referee: Chris Beath (Australia); Assistant referees: Anton Shchetinin (Australia), Ashley Beecham (Australia); Fourth official: Matthew Cream (Australia); Goal-line assistants: Nawaf Shukralla (Bahrain), Hettikamkanamge Perera (Sri Lanka)

23 October 2019 Second leg	Guangzhou Evergrande (China)	0–1	(Japan) Urawa Red Diamonds	Guangzhou, China
20:00 UTC+8	Zhang Linpeng (yellow card) 30'; Zheng Zhi (yellow card) 41'; Park Ji-soo (yellow card) 66'; Talisca (yellow card) 76'; Gao Lin (yellow card) 90+2'; Yang Liyu (yellow card) 90+4'	Report	Suzuki (yellow card) 32'; Koroki 50'; Nishikawa (yellow card) 58'	Stadium: Tianhe Stadium; Attendance: 39,999; Referee: Alireza Faghani (Iran); Assistant referees: Mohammad Reza Mansouri (Iran), Mohammadreza Abolfazli (Iran); Fourth official: Reza Sokhandan (Iran); Goal-line assistants: Adham Makhadmeh (Jordan), Ahmed Al-Ali (Jordan)

Guangzhou Evergrande lost 0–3 on aggregate.

== Statistics ==
As of 1 December 2019

=== Appearances and goals ===
No.	Pos.	Player	Super League			FA Cup			Champions League			Total		
No.	Pos.	Player	Apps.	Starts	Goals	Apps.	Starts	Goals	Apps.	Starts	Goals	Apps.	Starts	Goals
1	GK	(China) Liu Shibo	0	0	0	1	0	0	0	0	0	1	0	0
2	DF	(China) Liu Yiming	5	4	0	2	2	0	0	0	0	7	6	0
3	DF	(China) Mei Fang	6	6	0	0	0	0	2	1	0	8	7	0
4	DF	(England) Tyias Browning	4	2	0	1	1	0	8	8	0	13	11	0
5	DF	(China) Zhang Linpeng	26	26	0	2	2	1	11	10	0	39	38	1
6	DF	(China) Feng Xiaoting	16	15	1	0	0	0	4	4	0	20	19	1
7	FW	(China) Wei Shihao	25	23	11	3	2	3	9	6	1	37	31	15
8	MF	(Brazil) Paulinho	29	28	19	1	1	0	12	12	3	42	41	22
9	MF	(Brazil) Talisca	17	15	11	1	0	0	8	8	5	26	23	16
10	MF	(China) Zheng Zhi	16	9	0	1	1	0	8	7	0	25	17	0
11	MF	(China) Zhang Xiuwei	20	15	0	1	0	0	5	2	0	26	17	0
12	MF	(China) Xu Xin	18	7	1	2	1	0	3	0	0	23	8	1
13	MF	(China) He Chao	10	4	0	2	2	0	8	5	0	20	11	0
15	MF	(China) Yan Dinghao	15	9	4	2	2	0	1	0	0	18	11	4
16	MF	(China) Huang Bowen	26	21	0	2	2	0	11	9	1	39	32	1
17	FW	(China) Yang Liyu	27	27	4	2	2	1	10	8	1	39	36	6
18	FW	(Brazil) Elkeson	13	9	10	0	0	0	4	4	0	17	13	10
19	GK	(China) Zeng Cheng	4	4	0	1	1	0	6	6	0	11	11	0
20	MF	(China) Yu Hanchao	7	2	0	1	1	0	3	2	0	11	5	0
21	DF	(China) Gao Zhunyi	24	24	0	2	2	0	7	6	0	33	32	0
22	FW	(China) Tang Shi	1	0	0	2	2	0	1	0	0	4	2	0
23	DF	(South Korea) Park Ji-soo	20	18	1	2	2	0	12	12	0	34	32	1
25	DF	(China) Deng Hanwen	14	11	0	2	1	0	4	4	0	20	16	0
26	DF	(China) Hu Ruibao	0	0	0	1	1	0	1	0	0	2	1	0
27	DF	(China) Wu Shaocong	1	0	0	0	0	0	0	0	0	1	0	0
29	FW	(China) Gao Lin	17	8	1	2	2	1	9	5	0	29	15	2
30	MF	(China) Bughrahan Skandar	0	0	0	1	0	0	0	0	0	1	0	0
32	GK	(China) Liu Dianzuo	26	26	0	2	2	0	6	6	0	34	34	0
33	MF	(China) Zhong Yihao	19	5	2	1	0	0	5	1	0	25	6	2
34	MF	(China) Feng Boxuan	1	0	0	1	0	1	2	0	0	4	0	1
35	DF	(China) Li Xuepeng	13	11	0	1	1	0	7	6	0	21	18	0
36	MF	(Singapore) Jasteen Qays	0	0	0	0	0	0	0	0	0	0	0	0
TOTALS					65			7			11			83

=== Goalscorers ===
Rank	Player	No.	Pos.	Super League	FA Cup	Champions League	Total
1	(Brazil) Paulinho	8	MF	19	0	3	22
2	(Brazil) Talisca	9	MF	11	0	5	16
3	(China) Wei Shihao	7	FW	11	3	1	15
4	(Brazil) Elkeson	18	FW	10	0	0	10
5	(China) Yang Liyu	17	FW	4	1	1	6
6	(China) Yan Dinghao	15	MF	4	0	0	4
7	(China) Gao Lin	29	FW	1	1	0	2
7	(China) Zhong Yihao	33	MF	2	0	0	2
9	(China) Zhang Linpeng	5	DF	0	1	0	1
9	(China) Feng Xiaoting	6	DF	1	0	0	1
9	(China) Xu Xin	12	MF	1	0	0	1
9	(China) Huang Bowen	16	MF	0	0	1	1
9	(South Korea) Park Ji-soo	23	DF	1	0	0	1
9	(China) Feng Boxuan	34	MF	0	1	0	1
Own goals				3	0	3	6
TOTALS				68	7	14	89

=== Disciplinary record ===
No.	Pos.	Player	Super League			FA Cup			Champions League			Total		
No.	Pos.	Player	Yellow card	(yellow card) (yellow-red card)	Red card	Yellow card	(yellow card) (yellow-red card)	Red card	Yellow card	(yellow card) (yellow-red card)	Red card	Yellow card	(yellow card) (yellow-red card)	Red card
1	GK	(China) Liu Shibo	1	0	0	0	0	0	0	0	0	1	0	0
2	DF	(China) Liu Yiming	2	0	0	0	0	0	0	0	0	2	0	0
3	DF	(China) Mei Fang	1	0	0	0	0	0	0	0	0	1	0	0
5	DF	(China) Zhang Linpeng	4	1	0	0	0	0	2	0	0	6	1	0
6	DF	(China) Feng Xiaoting	1	0	0	0	0	0	0	0	0	1	0	0
7	FW	(China) Wei Shihao	3	0	0	0	0	0	1	0	0	4	0	0
8	MF	(Brazil) Paulinho	3	0	1	0	0	0	0	0	0	3	0	1
9	MF	(Brazil) Talisca	1	0	0	0	0	0	3	0	0	4	0	0
10	MF	(China) Zheng Zhi	4	0	0	0	0	0	3	0	0	7	0	0
11	MF	(China) Zhang Xiuwei	2	0	0	0	0	0	0	0	0	2	0	0
12	MF	(China) Xu Xin	4	0	0	0	0	0	1	0	0	5	0	0
13	MF	(China) He Chao	2	0	0	0	0	0	1	0	0	3	0	0
15	MF	(China) Yan Dinghao	2	0	0	1	0	0	0	0	0	3	0	0
16	MF	(China) Huang Bowen	2	0	0	0	0	0	2	0	0	4	0	0
17	FW	(China) Yang Liyu	2	0	0	0	0	0	2	0	0	4	0	0
21	DF	(China) Gao Zhunyi	4	0	0	1	0	0	1	0	0	6	0	0
23	DF	(South Korea) Park Ji-soo	2	0	0	1	0	0	3	0	0	6	0	0
25	DF	(China) Deng Hanwen	2	0	0	0	0	0	0	0	0	2	0	0
29	FW	(China) Gao Lin	0	0	0	0	0	0	3	0	0	3	0	0
32	GK	(China) Liu Dianzuo	1	0	0	0	0	0	0	0	0	1	0	0
33	MF	(China) Zhong Yihao	3	0	0	0	0	0	0	0	0	3	0	0
35	DF	(China) Li Xuepeng	2	0	0	0	0	0	0	0	0	2	0	0
36	MF	(Singapore) Jasteen Qays	0	0	0	0	0	0	0	0	0	0	0	0
TOTALS			47	1	1	3	0	0	22	0	0	72	1	1
