= Wei Shihao =

Chinese footballer (born 1995)

Wei Shihao 韦世豪
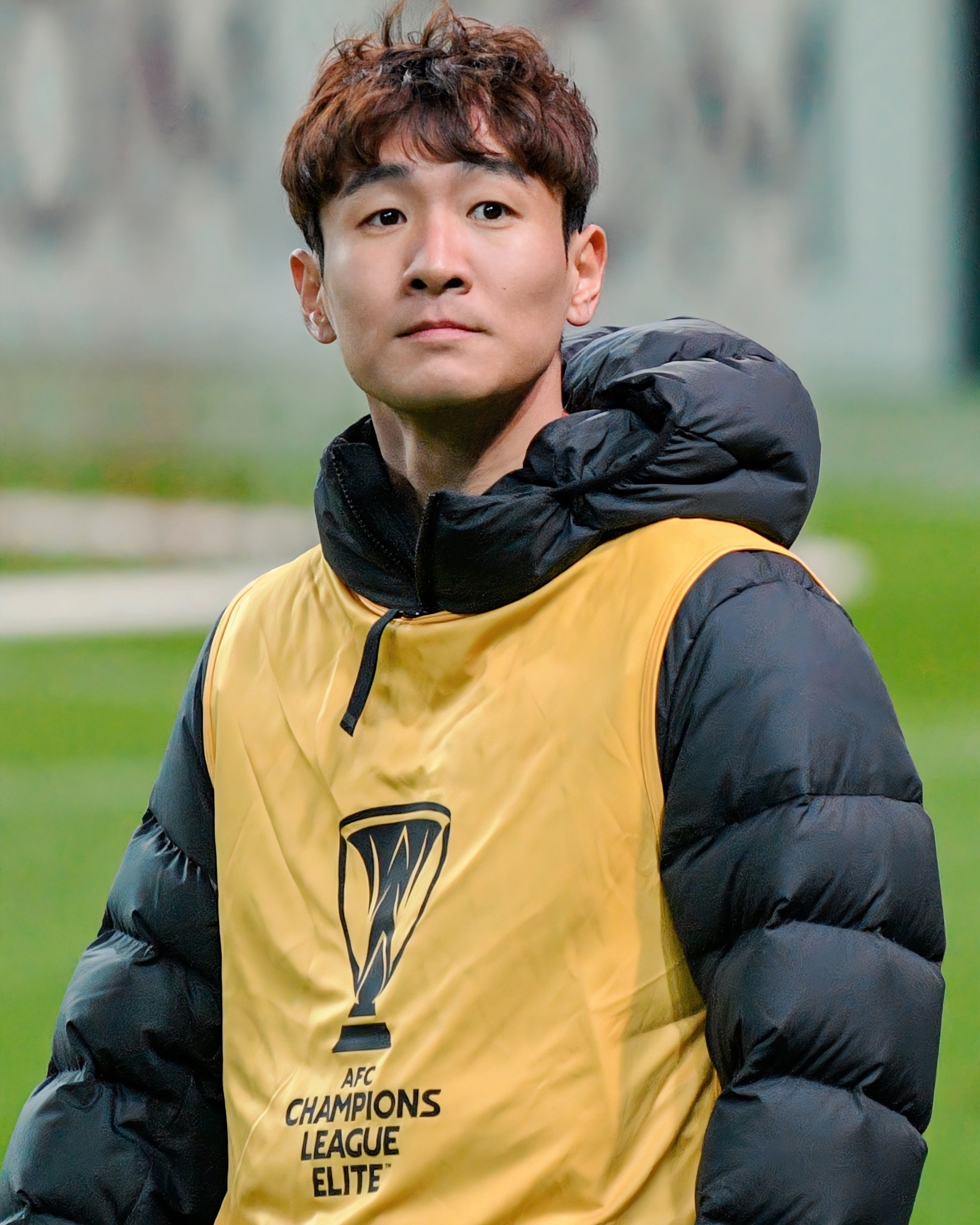
- Wei in 2025

Personal information
- Date of birth: 8 April 1995 (age 31)
- Place of birth: Bengbu, Anhui, China
- Height: 1.77 m (5 ft 10 in)
- Position: Winger

Team information
- Current team: Chengdu Rongcheng
- Number: 7

Youth career
- 2005–2013: Shandong Luneng
- 2013–2014: Boavista

Senior career*
Years	Team	Apps	(Gls)
2014–2015	Boavista	4	(0)
2015	Feirense	1	(0)
2015–2017	Leixões	18	(1)
2017	→ Shanghai SIPG (loan)	14	(3)
2018	Beijing Guoan	18	(2)
2019–2022	Guangzhou FC	80	(31)
2023	Wuhan Three Towns	19	(5)
2024–	Chengdu Rongcheng	70	(27)

International career^{‡}
2011–2013	China U16	15	(7)
2013–2014	China U19	12	(5)
2015–2018	China U23	23	(8)
2017–	China	47	(5)
Medal record
Representing China
Men's football
EAFF Championship
Bronze medal – third place	2017 Japan	Team
Bronze medal – third place	2019 South Korea	Team
Bronze medal – third place	2025 South Korea	Team
- * Club domestic league appearances and goals as of 8 November 2026 ‡ National team caps and goals as of 27 March 2026

Wei Shihao
- Simplified Chinese: 韦世豪
- Traditional Chinese: 韋世豪
Transcriptions
Standard Mandarin
- Hanyu Pinyin: Wéi Shìháo
- IPA: [wěɪ ʂî xǎʊ]

Wei Shihao (Chinese: 韦世豪; pinyin: Wéi Shìháo; born 8 April 1995) is a Chinese professional footballer who plays as a winger for Chinese Super League club Chengdu Rongcheng and the China national team.

== Club career ==
Wei Shihao started his football career when he joined Shandong Luneng's youth academy in 2005. He was deemed as a high potential player and was listed in a Bleacher Report article titled "Eight Teenagers Who Should Be on Every Big Club's Radar." In December 2012, he was recommended to Eredivisie giants Ajax for a trial along with Wang Chengkuai by former Ajax manager and youth scout Henk ten Cate, who managed for Shandong during the 2012 season. However, Shandong subsequently refused Ajax's trial request, forcing Wei to stay at the club.

In September 2013, Wei refused to sign a professional contract with Shandong and joined Segunda Divisão side Boavista's youth academy on a free transfer. He signed a new two-year contract with the club in June 2014 and was then promoted to the first team, whose application for participation in the Primeira Liga was approved. On 14 September 2014, Wei made his debut for the club in a 1–0 win against Académica de Coimbra, coming on as a substitute for Christian Pouga in the 50th minute.

On 15 July 2015, Wei transferred to Segunda Liga side Feirense. He made his debut for the club on 30 August 2015 in a 1–1 draw against Sporting Covilhã. On 31 December 2015, Wei transferred to fellow second-tier side Leixões. He made his debut for the club on 27 January 2016 in a 4–0 loss against Belenenses in the 2015-16 Taça da Liga.

=== Shanghai SIPG ===
On 25 February 2017, Wei extended his contract with the club until 30 June 2018 and was loaned to Chinese Super League side Shanghai SIPG for the 2017 season. He made his Chinese Super League debut and scored his first goal for the club on 7 April 2017 in a 2–1 home win against Shandong Luneng.

=== Beijing Guoan ===
On 7 January 2018, Wei transferred to top-tier side Beijing Guoan. He made his debut for the club on 4 March 2018 in a 3–0 away defeat at Shandong Luneng in the opening game of the 2018 Chinese Super League season, and scored his first goal for the club in a 2–1 away win at Jiangsu Suning on 11 March. On 28 July 2018, he scored a peculiar own goal in a 2–2 away draw at Shanghai Shenhua only one minute after coming on as a substitute, which was a late equalizer for the home team. On 26 September 2018, he scored twice in a 3–0 away win against Guangzhou R&F in the second leg of the Chinese FA Cup semi-final, which secured Guoan's 8–1 aggregated win and qualified for the final for the first time since 2003. He went on to win the 2018 Chinese FA Cup with Guoan on 30 November, which was the club's first major trophy in 9 years, but did not make an appearance in either leg in the final.

=== Guangzhou Evergrande ===
On 2 February 2019, Wei transferred to fellow top-tier side Guangzhou Evergrande. He would go on to establish himself as a regular within the team and go on to win the 2019 Chinese Super League title with the club. On 1 March 2019, He made his debut for the club in a 3–0 home win against Tianjin Tianhai in the opening game of the 2019 Chinese Super League season. On 18 June 2019, he scored his first AFC Champions League goal in a 2–1 home win against Shandong Luneng in the first leg of the last 16. On 1 December 2019, he won the first league title in his career with Evergrande after a 3–0 home win against Shanghai Shenhua, which was the 8th Chinese Super League title for Evergrande.

Wei was named as the captain of the team ahead of the 2022 Chinese Super League season as most senior players at the club departed in the midst of the club's financial predicament. As the team mostly consisted of academy players with no top division experience, they were relegated at the end of the season.

=== Wuhan Three Towns ===
On 4 April 2023, Wei joined fellow Chinese Super League club Wuhan Three Towns alongside Evergrande teammates Yan Dinghao and Li Yang. On 8 April 2023, he made his debut for the club and provided an assist for fellow debutant Abdul-Aziz Yakubu in a 2–0 win against Shandong Taishan in the 2023 Chinese FA Super Cup. On 23 May 2023, he scored his first goal for Three Towns in a 5–0 away win at Nantong Zhiyun.

== International career ==
Wei made his debut for the Chinese national team on 9 December 2017 in a 2–2 draw against South Korea in the 2017 EAFF E-1 Football Championship, scoring his first international goal.

Wei was a member of the Chinese squad for the 2019 AFC Asian Cup but did not make an appearance at the tournament.

On 12 December 2023, Wei was named in China's squad for the 2023 AFC Asian Cup in Qatar. On 22 January 2024, he made his debut in the competition in a 1–0 defeat against host Qatar, but could not prevent the team's elimination from the group stage.

== Career statistics ==
=== Club ===
As of 9 August 2026

Appearances and goals by club, season and competition
Club	Season	League			National cup		League cup		Continental		Other		Total	
Club	Season	Division	Apps	Goals	Apps	Goals	Apps	Goals	Apps	Goals	Apps	Goals	Apps	Goals
Boavista	2014–15	Primeira Liga	4	0	0	0	3	0	–		–		7	0
Feirense	2015–16	LigaPro	1	0	0	0	0	0	–		–		1	0
Leixões	2015–16	LigaPro	3	0	0	0	1	0	–		–		4	0
Leixões	2016–17	LigaPro	15	1	4	1	2	0	–		–		21	2
Leixões	Total		18	1	4	1	3	0	0	0	0	0	25	2
Shanghai SIPG (loan)	2017	Chinese Super League	14	3	6	1	–		1	0	–		21	4
Beijing Guoan	2018	Chinese Super League	18	2	4	2	–		–		–		22	4
Guangzhou Evergrande	2019	Chinese Super League	25	11	3	3	–		9	1	–		37	15
Guangzhou Evergrande	2020	Chinese Super League	10	8	0	0	–		4	1	–		14	9
Guangzhou Evergrande	2021	Chinese Super League	16	6	0	0	–		0	0	–		16	6
Guangzhou Evergrande	2022	Chinese Super League	29	6	0	0	–		0	0	–		29	6
Guangzhou Evergrande	Total		80	31	3	3	0	0	13	2	0	0	96	36
Wuhan Three Towns	2023	Chinese Super League	19	5	1	0	–		4	1	1 (Note: Appearances in Chinese FA Super Cup)	0	26	6
Chengdu Rongcheng	2024	Chinese Super League	21	8	3	1	–		–		–		24	9
Chengdu Rongcheng	2025	Chinese Super League	24	10	4	2	–		5	1	–		33	13
Chengdu Rongcheng	2026	Chinese Super League	25	9	2	3	–		–		–		27	12
Chengdu Rongcheng	Total		70	27	9	6	0	0	5	1	0	0	84	34
Career total			224	69	27	13	6	0	23	3	1	0	282	86

=== International ===
Appearances and goals by national team and year
National team	Year	Apps	Goals
China	2017	3	2
China	2018	5	0
China	2019	6	0
China	2020	0	0
China	2021	3	0
China	2022	2	0
China	2023	6	1
China	2024	9	1
China	2025	5	0
China	2026	8	1
Total		47	5

As of 27 March 2026

Scores and results list China's goal tally first, score column indicates score after each Wei goal.

List of international goals scored by Wei Shihao
No.	Date	Venue	Opponent	Score	Result	Competition
1	9 December 2017	Ajinomoto Stadium, Tokyo, Japan	South Korea	1–0	2–2	2017 EAFF E-1 Football Championship
2	16 December 2017	Ajinomoto Stadium, Tokyo, Japan	North Korea	1–0	1–1	2017 EAFF E-1 Football Championship
3	16 October 2023	Dalian Sports Centre Stadium, Dalian, China	Uzbekistan	1–0	1–2	Friendly
4	26 March 2024	Tianjin Olympic Centre, Tianjin, China	Singapore	1–0	4–1	2026 FIFA World Cup qualification
5	27 March 2026	Accor Stadium, Sydney, Australia	Curaçao	1–0	2–0	2026 FIFA Series

== Honours ==
Beijing Guoan

- Chinese FA Cup: 2018

Guangzhou Evergrande

- Chinese Super League: 2019

Wuhan Three Towns

- Chinese FA Super Cup: 2023

Individual

- Chinese Super League Domestic Golden Boot winner: 2019, 2020
