= Zhejiang Greentown Football School =

Private school in Zhejiang, China

- 浙江绿城足球学校
- Zhongtai, Yuhang District, Hangzhou, Zhejiang, China

Information
- Other name: Hangzhou Greentown Yuhua Taohuayuan School
- Type: Private full-time school
- Motto: Be a good person, read good books, play good football
- Established: September 2004
- Principal: Yang Jian
- Enrollment: ~400
- Affiliation: Greentown Education Group

Zhejiang Greentown Football School (simplified Chinese: 浙江绿城足球学校; traditional Chinese: 浙江綠城足球學校), also known as Hangzhou Greentown Yuhua Taohuayuan School (Chinese: 杭州绿城育华桃花源学校), is a private full-time school located in Zhongtai, Yuhang District, Hangzhou, Zhejiang, China. It was established in September 2004 by Greentown Group as a full-time private school affiliated with Greentown Education Company.

== History ==
The school was established in September 2004 and is located within the Greentown Zhongtai Football Training Base in Zhongtai Township, Yuhang District, Hangzhou. In 2004, Greentown invested 130 million yuan to build the Zhongtai Football Training Base on 216 mu of land in the western suburbs of Hangzhou; the base is equipped with nine standard training fields.

The school operates under two names: Zhejiang Greentown Football School and Hangzhou Greentown Yuhua Taohuayuan School. The school is not subordinate to Zhejiang Professional Football Club but rather to Greentown Education Group.

== Educational philosophy and curriculum ==
The school's motto is "Be a good person, read good books, play good football. The school operates under the philosophy of "culture first, football as a characteristic." Students attend six cultural classes, two football training classes, and two self-study sessions daily; children train for approximately one and a half hours per day. The school offers Japanese as an elective course.

== Enrollment and student body ==
In 2011, the school had 15 classes from primary to high school, with approximately 350 students and nearly 80 staff members. By 2015, the school had more than 390 students. As of 2019, the school maintained more than 400 students, with two-thirds belonging to the school team and one-third serving as elite players for the football club; the two groups implement a survival-of-the-fittest mechanism with regular assessments. The school has 20 full-time football coaches.

== Academic and professional outcomes ==
The school has produced nearly 400 high school graduates since its first graduating class in 2007, with over 100 becoming professional footballers and the remainder entering university. By 2021, nearly 400 graduates had entered university through cultural and football comprehensive advantages. The school offers referee and coaching courses, with some students obtaining national football referee certificates and E or D level coaching certificates during high school.

== Japanese cooperation ==
In 2012, Zhejiang Professional Football Club invited Japanese coaches to prepare for the National Games, beginning cooperation with Japanese youth training teams. In 2014, through the connection of former head coach Okada Takeshi, the club established comprehensive youth training cooperation with Japanese clubs. In February 2016, the club announced it would switch its Japanese cooperation partner to FC Imabari effective 1 March 2016, with Okada Takeshi's team responsible for training Chinese coaches and the Japanese side leading the production of youth training outlines. By 2019, the cooperation had entered its sixth year, with age groups from 2005 to 2011 trained by Japanese head coaches using the "Okada training method." In December 2023, the club renewed its strategic cooperation agreement with the Japanese youth training team.

== Notable alumni ==
Players produced by the school include Zhang Yuning, Xie Pengfei, Shi Ke, Yan Dinghao, and Tong Lei.

== Honours ==
Institutional

- AFC Three-Star Youth Academy (with Shandong Taishan)
