= Park Ji-soo (footballer) =

South Korean footballer (born 1994)

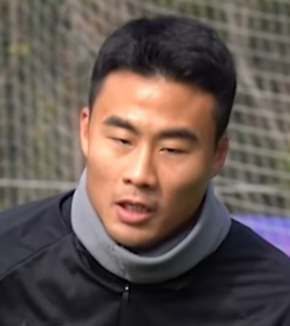
- Park in 2021

Personal information
- Full name: Park Ji-soo
- Date of birth: 13 June 1994 (age 32)
- Place of birth: Mungyeong, Gyeongbuk, South Korea
- Height: 1.87 m (6 ft 1 1/2 in)
- Position: Centre-back

Team information
- Current team: Jeonbuk Hyundai Motors
- Number: 5

Youth career
- 2010–2012: Incheon United (Note: Played for Incheon Daegun High School, which was an academy of Incheon United.)

Senior career*
| Years | Team | Apps | (Gls) |
| 2013 | Incheon United | 0 | (0) |
| 2014 | FC Uijeongbu | 20 | (1) |
| 2015–2018 | Gyeongnam FC | 129 | (6) |
| 2019–2022 | Guangzhou FC | 38 | (1) |
| 2021–2022 | → Suwon FC (loan) | 14 | (0) |
| 2021–2022 | → Gimcheon Sangmu (draft) | 37 | (2) |
| 2023 | Portimonense | 14 | (0) |
| 2023–2025 | Wuhan Three Towns | 64 | (3) |
| 2026– | Jeonbuk Hyundai Motors | 6 | (0) |

International career^{‡}
| 2009 | South Korea U17 | 2 (Note: Includes one appearance against non-national team.) | (0) |
| 2021 | South Korea U23 | 4 (Note: Appearances as an overage player in Summer Olympics) | (0) |
| 2018– | South Korea | 16 | (0) |
Medal record
Men's football
Representing South Korea
EAFF Championship
| Winner | 2019 South Korea |
| Runner-up | 2022 Japan |
- * Club domestic league appearances and goals as of 3 August 2026 ‡ National team caps and goals as of 20 June 2023

Park Ji-soo (Korean: 박지수; Hanja: 朴志洙; born 13 June 1994) is a South Korean footballer who plays as a centre back for Jeonbuk Hyundai Motors and the South Korea national team.

== Playing career ==
=== Early career ===
Park played for K League club Incheon United's youth team before he was promoted to their senior team where he signed his first professional contract at the start of the 2013 season. Throughout the season he did not make any appearances for the team and was released from the club at the end of the season. This saw Park join K3 League club FC Uijeongbu for the 2014 season before going on a practice match against K League 2 club Gyeongnam FC where he showed potential and attracted Gyeongnam.

=== Gyeongnam FC ===
In January 2015, Park officially joined Gyeongnam FC. On 22 March, he made his Gyeongnam debut in a 0–0 league draw with Ansan Police. On 5 July, he scored his first professional goal in a 1–1 league draw with Chungju Hummel. Park established himself as an integral part of the team's defence and went on to aid the club to get the 2017 K League 2 title and promotion to the K League 1. Park and Gyeongnam FC continued to be on an upward trajectory and the club surprisingly came runners-up at the 2018 K League 1.

=== Guangzhou Evergrande ===
On 20 February 2019, Park transferred to Chinese Super League side Guangzhou Evergrande. On 5 March 2019, he made his debut for the club in a 2–0 AFC Champions League win over J1 League side Sanfrecce Hiroshima. He established himself as a main defender within the team and won the 2019 Chinese Super League title.

=== Portimonense ===
On 25 January 2023, Park signed for Primeira Liga club Portimonense on a one-and-a-half-year contract. At Portimonense for half a year, he played as a main defender, participating in 14 league matches as a starter. However, he left the club after the end of the season to get a higher salary. On 15 July, Park returned to China and signed for Chinese Super League club Wuhan Three Towns.

=== Jeonbuk Hyundai Motors ===
After playing for Wuhan for two and a half years, on 3 January 2026, the club announced his departure. On 8 January, Park signed for K League 1 club Jeonbuk Hyundai Motors.

== Career statistics ==
=== Club ===
As of match played 3 August 2026

Appearances and goals by club, season and competition
| Club | Season | League | | | Cup | | Continental | | Other | | Total | |
| Club | Season | Division | Apps | Goals | Apps | Goals | Apps | Goals | Apps | Goals | Apps | Goals |
|---|---|---|---|---|---|---|---|---|---|---|---|---|
| Incheon United | 2013 | K League 1 | 0 | 0 | 0 | 0 | — | | — | | 0 | 0 |
| FC Uijeongbu | 2014 | K3 League | 20 | 1 | 0 | 0 | — | | — | | 20 | 1 |
| Gyeongnam FC | 2015 | K League 2 | 28 | 1 | 1 | 0 | — | | — | | 29 | 1 |
| Gyeongnam FC | 2016 | K League 2 | 35 | 1 | 1 | 0 | — | | — | | 36 | 1 |
| Gyeongnam FC | 2017 | K League 2 | 33 | 2 | 3 | 0 | — | | — | | 36 | 2 |
| Gyeongnam FC | 2018 | K League 1 | 33 | 2 | 0 | 0 | — | | — | | 33 | 2 |
| Gyeongnam FC | Total | | 129 | 6 | 5 | 0 | — | | — | | 134 | 6 |
| Guangzhou Evergrande | 2019 | Chinese Super League | 20 | 1 | 2 | 0 | 12 | 0 | — | | 34 | 1 |
| Guangzhou Evergrande | 2020 | Chinese Super League | 18 | 0 | 1 | 0 | 3 | 0 | — | | 22 | 0 |
| Guangzhou Evergrande | Total | | 38 | 1 | 3 | 0 | 15 | 0 | — | | 56 | 1 |
| Suwon FC (loan) | 2021 | K League 1 | 14 | 0 | 1 | 0 | — | | — | | 15 | 0 |
| Gimcheon Sangmu (draft) | 2021 | K League 2 | 7 | 1 | 1 | 0 | — | | — | | 8 | 1 |
| Gimcheon Sangmu (draft) | 2022 | K League 1 | 30 | 1 | 0 | 0 | — | | 2 (Note: Appearance in K League promotion-relegation playoffs) | 0 | 32 | 1 |
| Gimcheon Sangmu (draft) | Total | | 37 | 2 | 1 | 0 | — | | 2 | 0 | 40 | 2 |
| Portimonense | 2022–23 | Primeira Liga | 14 | 0 | 0 | 0 | — | | — | | 14 | 0 |
| Wuhan Three Towns | 2023 | Chinese Super League | 9 | 1 | 1 | 0 | 5 | 0 | — | | 15 | 1 |
| Wuhan Three Towns | 2024 | Chinese Super League | 29 | 1 | 0 | 0 | — | | — | | 29 | 1 |
| Wuhan Three Towns | 2025 | Chinese Super League | 26 | 1 | 0 | 0 | — | | — | | 26 | 1 |
| Wuhan Three Towns | Total | | 64 | 3 | 1 | 0 | 5 | 0 | — | | 70 | 3 |
| Jeonbuk Hyundai Motors | 2026 | K League 1 | 6 | 0 | 1 | 0 | 0 | 0 | — | | 7 | 0 |
| Career total | | | 322 | 13 | 12 | 0 | 20 | 0 | 2 | 0 | 356 | 13 |

=== International ===
As of 20 June 2023

Appearances and goals by national team and year
| National team | Year | Apps | Goals |
|---|---|---|---|
| South Korea | 2018 | 1 | 0 |
| South Korea | 2019 | 2 | 0 |
| South Korea | 2021 | 5 | 0 |
| South Korea | 2022 | 6 | 0 |
| South Korea | 2023 | 2 | 0 |
| Career total | | 16 | 0 |

== Honours ==
Gyeongnam FC

- K League 2: 2017

Guangzhou Evergrande

- Chinese Super League: 2019

Gimcheon Sangmu

- K League 2: 2021

Jeonbuk Hyundai Motors

- K League Super Cup: 2026

South Korea

- EAFF Championship: 2019

Individual

- K League 2 Best XI: 2017
- AFC Champions League All-Star Squad: 2019
- AFC Champions League Opta Best XI: 2019
