= Tan Kaiyuan =

Chinese footballer (born 2001)

Personal information
- Date of birth: 19 August 2001 (age 25)
- Place of birth: Qingdao, Shandong, China
- Height: 1.83 m (6 ft 0 in)
- Position: Midfielder

Team information
- Current team: Shaanxi Union
- Number: 33

Youth career
- Shandong Luneng Taishan
- 2012–2018: Evergrande Football School
- 2018–2020: Guangzhou Evergrande

Senior career*
Years	Team	Apps	(Gls)
2020–2021	Guangzhou Evergrande	12	(3)
2022–2023	Guangzhou FC	8	(0)
2023–2024	RCD Espanyol B	8	(0)
2024	Qingdao West Coast	8	(0)
2025–	Shaanxi Union	20	(2)

International career
2020	China U19		
- * Club domestic league appearances and goals as of 31 December 2025

Tan Kaiyuan (Chinese: 谭凯元; born 19 August 2001) is a Chinese footballer currently playing as a midfielder for Shaanxi Union.

== Early life ==
As a child, Tan took an interest in kung fu, before enrolling in a football class in order to keep fit. He started playing as a goalkeeper, but instead of catching the ball like most goalkeepers, he would opt to header it instead.

He studied at the Yiyang Road Primary School in Qingdao, where he found that he preferred scoring goals to saving them, and in 2012 he finished second-top scorer, and was named "Campus Football Hope Star", at a youth tournament.

== Club career ==
After noticing his son's footballing ability, Tan's father signed him up to Shandong Luneng Taishan's Luneng Football School. However, due to the lack of opportunities to showcase his talent in competitions, he moved to the Evergrande Football School in 2012. During his time in the Evergrande Football School, he was sent to Spain on a three-year study programme in 2014.

On his return to China in 2018, he was named Most Valuable Player of the Chinese under-17 league, and was promoted to the Guangzhou Evergrande senior squad from the Guangzhou Football School. He was eventually given his debut on 25 July 2020, in a 2–0 win against Shanghai Shenhua. He scored his first goal for the club in a 2–0 Chinese FA Cup win over Henan Jianye on 18 September of the same year. However, he also suffered a torn ligament injury during the game, and was side-lined for over a year.

His return to the first team for the 2021 Chinese Super League season was very successful, and despite only featuring in 179 minutes of football spread over ten games, he managed to score three goals. Following the expiration of his contract at the conclusion of the 2021 season, Tan travelled to Serbia to trial with Vojvodina as a free agent. The trial was successful, and Tan was even included in the squad photo for the season, however Guangzhou reportedly requested ¥300,000 (€43,000) for youth training compensation, which Vojvodina were unwilling to pay. He returned to China, and was welcomed back by his former club, going on to feature at the end of the 2022 Chinese Super League season.

On 3 February 2023, Tan moved to Spain to join RCD Espanyol, being assigned to their 'B' team. The club had reportedly been scouting him since 2019, and he began officially training with the reserves later the same month. On 1 April 2023, in a 3–1 Segunda Federación win over Ebro, Tan came off the bench late into the game and provided an assist for Kenneth Soler's goal - his first assist for the club.

On 19 February 2025, Tan joined newly promoted China League One club Shaanxi Union.

== International career ==
Tan has represented China at under-19 level.

== Career statistics ==
As of 31 December 2025.

Appearances and goals by club, season and competition
Club	Season	League			Cup		Continental		Other		Total	
Club	Season	Division	Apps	Goals	Apps	Goals	Apps	Goals	Apps	Goals	Apps	Goals
Guangzhou FC	2020	Chinese Super League	2	0	1 (Note: Appearances in the Chinese FA Cup)	1	0	0	0	0	3	1
Guangzhou FC	2021	Chinese Super League	10	3	1	0	—		0	0	11	3
Guangzhou FC	2022	Chinese Super League	8	0	2	1	—		0	0	10	1
Guangzhou FC	Total		20	3	4	2	0	0	0	0	24	5
RCD Espanyol B	2022–23	Segunda Federación	8	0	0	0	—		0	0	8	0
RCD Espanyol B	2023–24	Segunda Federación	0	0	0	0	—		0	0	0	0
RCD Espanyol B	Total		8	0	0	0	0	0	0	0	8	0
Qingdao West Coast	2024	Chinese Super League	8	0	2	1	—		0	0	10	1
Shaanxi Union	2025	China League One	20	2	0	0	—		0	0	20	2
Career total			56	5	6	3	0	0	0	0	62	8

== Honours ==
Guangzhou Evergrande

- Chinese FA Super Cup: 2018
