= Zhao Wenzhe =

Chinese association football player

Personal information
- Date of birth: 10 January 2001 (age 25)
- Place of birth: Henan, China
- Height: 1.84 m (6 ft 0 in)
- Position: Defender

Team information
- Current team: Wenzhou FC
- Number: 6

Youth career
- Henan Jianye
- Villarreal
- Guangzhou Evergrande

Senior career*
Years	Team	Apps	(Gls)
2020–2023	Guangzhou FC	25	(0)
2024	Jiangxi Dark Horse Junior	24	(1)
2025	Nanjing City	6	(0)
2026–	Wenzhou FC	0	(0)
- * Club domestic league appearances and goals as of 14:01, 30 January 2023 (UTC)

Zhao Wenzhe (Chinese: 赵文哲; born 10 January 2001) is a Chinese footballer currently playing as a defender for Wenzhou FC.

== Career statistics ==
=== Club ===
As of 30 January 2023.

Appearances and goals by club, season and competition
Club	Season	League			Cup		Continental		Other		Total	
Club	Season	Division	Apps	Goals	Apps	Goals	Apps	Goals	Apps	Goals	Apps	Goals
Guangzhou FC	2020	Chinese Super League	0	0	1 (Note: Appearances in the Chinese FA Cup)	0	0	0	0	0	1	0
Guangzhou FC	2021	Chinese Super League	0	0	0	0	4 (Note: Appearances in the AFC Champions League)	0	0	0	4	0
Guangzhou FC	2022	Chinese Super League	16	0	2	0	0	0	0	0	18	0
Career total			16	0	3	0	4	0	0	0	23	0
