= Liu Shibo =

Chinese footballer (born 1997)

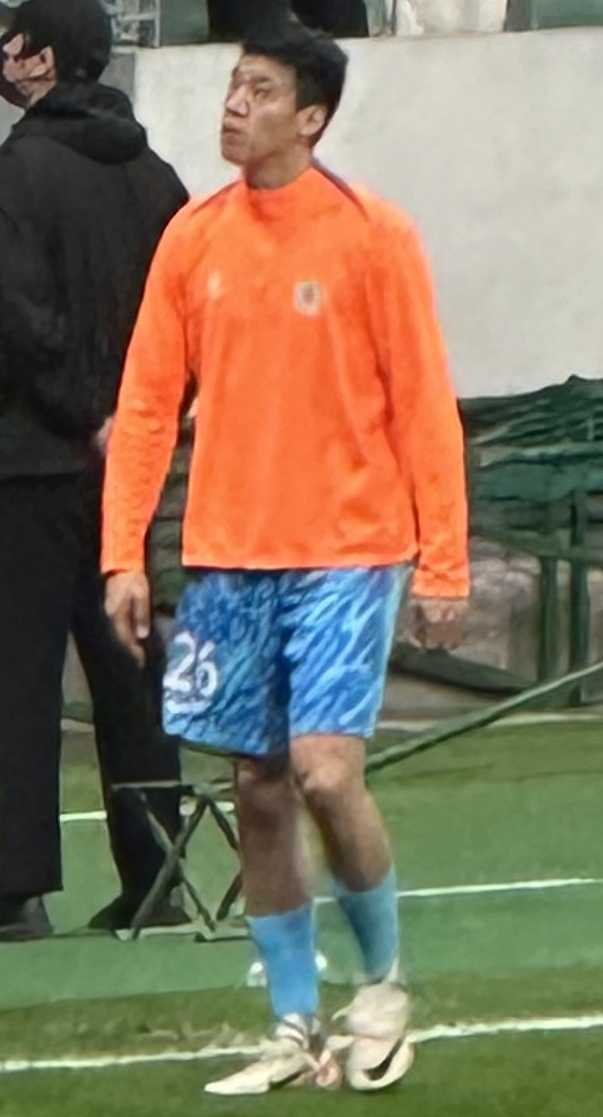
- Liu Shibo in April 2025

Personal information
- Date of birth: 20 May 1997 (age 29)
- Place of birth: Shenyang, Liaoning, China
- Height: 1.89 m (6 ft 2 in)
- Position: Goalkeeper

Team information
- Current team: Qingdao West Coast
- Number: 26

Youth career
- 2016: Guangzhou Evergrande

Senior career*
Years	Team	Apps	(Gls)
2017–2022	Guangzhou FC	16	(0)
2017	→ Nei Mongol Zhongyou (Loan)	5	(0)
2023–2025	Shandong Taishan	5	(0)
2025	→ Qingdao Red Lions (Loan)	12	(0)
2026–	Qingdao West Coast	3	(0)
- * Club domestic league appearances and goals as of 19 November 2026

Liu Shibo (simplified Chinese: 刘世博; traditional Chinese: 劉世博; pinyin: Liú Shìbó; born 20 May 1997) is a Chinese footballer who plays as a goalkeeper for Qingdao West Coast.

== Club career ==
Liu Shibo was promoted to the Guangzhou Evergrande senior team in the 2017 league season and then loaned out to second tier club Nei Mongol Zhongyou where he made his debut in a league game on 22 July 2017 against Yunnan Lijiang in a 1-1 draw. Upon his return to Guangzhou he would eventually make his debut for the club on 29 May 2019 in a Chinese FA Cup game against Beijing Renhe where he came on as a substitute for Liu Dianzuo in a 5-0 victory.

== Career statistics ==
As of 7 October 2022.

Club	Season	League			Cup		Continental		Other		Total	
Club	Season	Division	Apps	Goals	Apps	Goals	Apps	Goals	Apps	Goals	Apps	Goals
Nei Mongol Zhongyou (loan)	2017	China League One	5	0	0	0	-		-		5	0
Guangzhou Evergrande	2018	Chinese Super League	0	0	0	0	0	0	0 (Note: Appearances in Chinese FA Super Cup)	0	0	0
Guangzhou Evergrande	2019	Chinese Super League	0	0	1	0	0	0	-		1	0
Guangzhou Evergrande	2020	Chinese Super League	0	0	0	0	0	0	-		0	0
Guangzhou Evergrande	2021	Chinese Super League	2	0	0	0	0	0	-		2	0
Guangzhou Evergrande	2022	Chinese Super League	14	0	0	0	0	0	-		14	0
Guangzhou Evergrande	Total		16	0	1	0	0	0	0	0	17	0
Career total			21	0	1	0	0	0	0	0	22	0

== Honours ==
=== Club ===
Guangzhou Evergrande

- Chinese Super League: 2019
