= Zhang Xiuwei =

Chinese footballer

Zhang Xiuwei 张修维
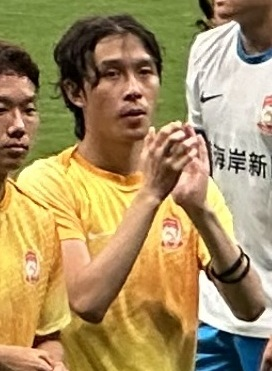
- Zhang Xiuwei in June 2025

Personal information
- Full name: Zhang Xiuwei
- Date of birth: 13 January 1996 (age 30)
- Place of birth: Dazhou, Sichuan, China
- Height: 1.74 m (5 ft 8 1/2 in)
- Position: Midfielder

Team information
- Current team: Qingdao West Coast
- Number: 8

Youth career
- 2009–2013: Chengdu Youth
- 2014–2016: Lyon

Senior career*
Years	Team	Apps	(Gls)
2014–2016	Lyon B	2	(0)
2016–2018	Tianjin Quanjian	48	(4)
2019–2022	Guangzhou FC	60	(0)
2023–	Qingdao West Coast	79	(4)

International career^{‡}
2011–2012	China U-17	14	(3)
2014–2015	China U-20	11	(1)
2016–2017	China U-23	6	(1)
2018–	China	2	(0)
- * Club domestic league appearances and goals as of 19 November 2026 ‡ National team caps and goals as of 1 December 2019

Zhang Xiuwei (simplified Chinese: 张修维; traditional Chinese: 張修維; pinyin: Zhāng Xiūwéi; born 13 March 1996) is a Chinese professional footballer who plays as a midfielder for Chinese Super League club Qingdao West Coast.

== Club career ==
Zhang Xiuwei started his football career when he joined Chengdu Youth in 2009. After an unsuccessful trial with Lille, he then joined Lyon's youth academy in April 2014, signing a two-year contract. He made his senior debut for Lyon B on 23 August 2014 in a 1–1 draw against Lyon-Duchère in the Championnat de France Amateur.

On 1 February 2016, Zhang transferred to China League One side Tianjin Quanjian. He made his debut for the club on 8 May 2016 in a 3–2 away loss against Qingdao Jonoon, coming on as a substitute for Xia Ningning in the 67th minute. He became a regular starter after Fabio Cannavaro was appointed as the manager of the club. On 4 September 2016, he scored his first senior goal in a 1–0 home win against Wuhan Zall. He then scored twice on 11 September 2016 in a 3–1 away win against Beijing Renhe. He scored three goals in 15 appearances in the 2016 season as Tianjin won the League One title and promotion to the top tier. He underwent a successful surgery for a metatarsal fracture in November 2016. On 1 April 2017, Zhang made his Super League debut in a 1–0 home win against Henan Jianye, coming on for Wang Yongpo in the 77th minute. He scored his first Super League goal on 3 June 2017 in a 2–1 away win against Shandong Luneng.

On 15 August 2017, Zhang involved in a car accident at Heping District where he hit six cars with his Porsche 991. A blood test showed that his blood alcohol content was 189.3 mg/100ml (0.1893%). He was arrested on 16 August 2017 on suspicion of driving under the influence. On 14 September 2017, Zhang, who was out on bail, was temporary banned from football by the Chinese Football Association. He was sentenced to three months' probation on 15 December 2017, missing Tianjin Quanjian's preseason training for the 2018 season. He was also revealed to have used a fake ID under the name Zhang Jixuan (born 13 March 1994) to register for a youth match in 2011. On 30 January 2018, Zhang was banned for nine months from 19 September 2017 to 18 June 2018 for age falsification.

Zhang was linked to fellow Chinese Super League side Guangzhou Evergrande to rejoin Fabio Cannavaro in February 2018. However, he eventually stayed at the club following a disagreement regarding a three-way transaction between Tianjin Quanjian, Guangzhou Evergrande and Shanghai Shenhua. Zhang eventually returned to the first team squad in July 2018. On 17 July 2018, he made his return after 341 days in a 2–1 win against Guangzhou R&F, coming on for Su Yuanjie in the 57th minute.

On 7 February 2019, Zhang transferred to fellow top-tier side Guangzhou Evergrande after Quanjian Group was accused of illegal affairs. He made his debut for the club on 1 March 2019 in a 3–0 home win against Tianjin Tianhai. He would go on to establish himself as a regular within the team and go on to win the 2019 Chinese Super League title with the club.

== International career ==
Zhang participated in the 2012 AFC U-16 Championship, 2014 AFC U-19 Championship and 2018 AFC U-23 Championship qualification. However, he failed to represent Chinese under-23 national team for the 2018 AFC U-23 Championship and 2018 Asian Games due to suspension.

In October 2018, Zhang received his first call-up to the Chinese national team by then manager Marcello Lippi. He made his international debut on 16 October 2018 in a 2–0 win against Syria, coming on for Wu Xi in the 87th minute.

== Career statistics ==
=== Club statistics ===
As of 5 November 2023

Appearances and goals by club, season and competition
Club	Season	League			National Cup		League Cup		Continental		Total	
Club	Season	Division	Apps	Goals	Apps	Goals	Apps	Goals	Apps	Goals	Apps	Goals
Lyon B	2014–15	Championnat de France Amateur	2	0	0	0	0	0	-		2	0
Lyon B	2015–16	Championnat de France Amateur	0	0	0	0	0	0	-		0	0
Lyon B	Total		2	0	0	0	0	0	0	0	2	0
Tianjin Quanjian	2016	China League One	15	3	3	0	-		-		18	3
Tianjin Quanjian	2017	Chinese Super League	17	1	3	0	-		-		20	1
Tianjin Quanjian	2018	Chinese Super League	16	0	0	0	-		1	0	17	0
Tianjin Quanjian	Total		48	4	6	0	0	0	1	0	55	4
Guangzhou Evergrande	2019	Chinese Super League	20	0	1	0	-		5	0	26	0
Guangzhou Evergrande	2020	Chinese Super League	11	0	1	0	-		3	0	15	0
Guangzhou Evergrande	2021	Chinese Super League	15	0	0	0	-		0	0	15	0
Guangzhou Evergrande	2022	Chinese Super League	14	0	0	0	-		-		14	0
Guangzhou Evergrande	Total		60	0	2	0	0	0	8	0	70	0
Qingdao West Coast	2023	China League One	11	0	1	0	-		-		12	0
Qingdao West Coast	2024	Chinese Super League	21	3	2	0	-		-		23	3
Qingdao West Coast	2025	Chinese Super League	25	1	0	0	-		-		25	1
Qingdao West Coast	Total		57	4	3	0	0	0	0	0	60	4
Career total			167	8	11	0	0	0	9	0	187	8

=== International statistics ===
National team
Year	Apps	Goals
2018	1	0
2019	1	0
Total	2	0

== Honours ==
=== Club ===
Tianjin Quanjian

- China League One: 2016

Guangzhou Evergrande

- Chinese Super League: 2019
