= Bughrahan Iskandar =

Chinese footballer (born 2000)

Bughrahan Iskandar 布格拉汗·斯坎旦尔
Personal information
- Date of birth: 11 August 2000 (age 26)
- Place of birth: Hami, Xinjiang, China
- Height: 1.78 m (5 ft 10 in)
- Position: Forward

Team information
- Current team: Shanxi Chongde Ronghai
- Number: 10

Youth career
- 2013–2019: Evergrande Football School

Senior career*
Years	Team	Apps	(Gls)
2019–2020	Guangzhou Evergrande	1	(0)
2021–2022	Cangzhou Mighty Lions	24	(1)
2023	Guangzhou FC	23	(5)
2024	Chengdu Rongcheng	0	(0)
2024	→ Hunan Billows (loan)	8	(0)
2025	Qingdao Red Lions	10	(0)
2026–	Shanxi Chongde Ronghai	0	(0)
- * Club domestic league appearances and goals as of 10:42, 20 March 2026 (UTC)

Bughrahan Iskandar (Chinese: 布格拉汗·斯坎旦尔; pinyin: Bùgélāhàn Sīkǎndàněr; Uyghur: بۇغراخان ئىسكەندەر, romanized: Bughrahan Iskender; born 11 August 2000) is a Chinese footballer currently playing as a forward for China League Two club Shanxi Chongde Ronghai.

== Club career ==
Bughrahan was promoted to the senior team of Guangzhou Evergrande within the 2019 Chinese Super League season and would make his debut in a Chinese FA Cup game on 29 May 2019 against Beijing Renhe in a 5–0 victory. He would also be part of the squad that won the 2019 Chinese Super League title that season. While he gained some more playing time at Guangzhou, he was allowed to be transferred to another top tier club in Cangzhou Mighty Lions where he made his debut in a league game on 14 May 2021 against Guangzhou City that ended in a 0–0 draw.

== Career statistics ==
As of match played 16 September 2023

Appearances and goals by club, season and competition
Club	Season	League			Cup		Continental		Other		Total	
Club	Season	Division	Apps	Goals	Apps	Goals	Apps	Goals	Apps	Goals	Apps	Goals
Guangzhou Evergrande	2019	Chinese Super League	0	0	1	0	0	0	—		1	0
Guangzhou Evergrande	2020	Chinese Super League	1	0	2	0	0	0	—		3	0
Guangzhou Evergrande	Total		1	0	3	0	0	0	0	0	4	0
Cangzhou Mighty Lions	2021	Chinese Super League	9	0	2	1	—		—		11	1
Cangzhou Mighty Lions	2022	Chinese Super League	15	1	4	0	—		—		19	1
Cangzhou Mighty Lions	Total		24	1	6	1	0	0	0	0	30	2
Guangzhou FC	2023	China League One	17	4	2	0	—		—		19	0
Career total			42	5	11	1	0	0	0	0	53	6

== Honours ==
=== Club ===
Guangzhou Evergrande

- Chinese Super League: 2019
