= He Chao (footballer) =

Chinese footballer (born 1995)

He Chao 何超
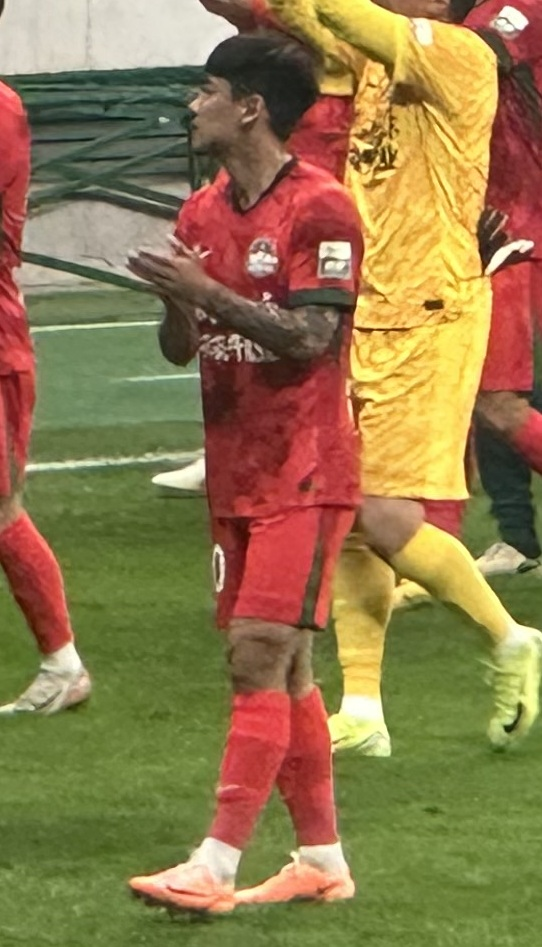
- He Chao in April 2025

Personal information
- Full name: He Chao
- Date of birth: 19 April 1995 (age 31)
- Place of birth: Liaoyang, Liaoning, China
- Height: 1.78 m (5 ft 10 in)
- Position: Midfielder

Team information
- Current team: Henan FC
- Number: 21

Youth career
- 2006–2013: Changchun Yatai
- 2011–2013: → Casa Pia (loan)

Senior career*
Years	Team	Apps	(Gls)
2014–2018	Changchun Yatai	65	(0)
2019–2021	Guangzhou FC	40	(1)
2019	→ Jiangsu Suning (loan)	10	(0)
2022–2024	Wuhan Three Towns	58	(3)
2025–	Henan FC	50	(1)

International career^{‡}
2014–2015	China U-19	8	(2)
2016–2018	China U-23	27	(1)
2017–	China	7	(0)
Medal record
Representing China
Men's football
EAFF Championship
Bronze medal – third place	2017 Japan	Team
- * Club domestic league appearances and goals as of 22 November 2026 ‡ National team caps and goals as of 27 November 2019

He Chao
- Chinese: 何超
Transcriptions
Standard Mandarin
- Hanyu Pinyin: Hé Chāo
- IPA: [xɤ̌ ʈʂʰáʊ]

He Chao (Chinese: 何超; pinyin: Hé Chāo; born 19 April 1995) is a Chinese professional footballer who plays as a midfielder for Chinese Super League club Henan FC.

== Club career ==
He Chao started his football career when he joined Changchun Yatai's youth academy in 2006. In December 2011, He went to Portugal for the Chinese Football Association's 500.com Stars Project and joined Casa Pia's youth academy. He was then promoted to Changchun's first team squad in 2014. He made his debut for the club on 12 April 2014 in a 1–0 away loss against Shanghai East Asia.

On 7 February 2019, He transferred to Chinese Super League side Guangzhou Evergrande after Changchun was relegated to the second tier. He made his debut for the club on 1 March 2019 in a 3–0 home win against Tianjin Tianhai. On 9 July 2019, He was loaned out to fellow top tier side Jiangsu Suning for the remainder of the 2019 season.

On 29 April 2022, he signed with newly promoted top tier side Wuhan Three Towns. He would go on to make his debut on 3 June 2022, in a league game against Hebei, which ended in a 4-0 victory. After the game he would go on to establish himself as a regular within the team that won the 2022 Chinese Super League title.

On 17 January 2025, He signed with another Chinese Super League club Henan FC.

== International career ==
He made his debut for the Chinese national team on 9 December 2017 in a 2–2 draw against South Korea in the 2017 EAFF E-1 Football Championship.

== Career statistics ==
=== Club statistics ===
As of 31 December 2024.

Appearances and goals by club, season and competition
Club	Season	League			National Cup		Continental		Other		Total	
Club	Season	Division	Apps	Goals	Apps	Goals	Apps	Goals	Apps	Goals	Apps	Goals
Changchun Yatai	2014	Chinese Super League	3	0	1	0	-		-		4	0
Changchun Yatai	2015	Chinese Super League	3	0	1	0	-		-		4	0
Changchun Yatai	2016	Chinese Super League	12	0	1	0	-		-		13	0
Changchun Yatai	2017	Chinese Super League	24	0	0	0	-		-		24	0
Changchun Yatai	2018	Chinese Super League	22	0	0	0	-		-		22	0
Changchun Yatai	Total		64	0	3	0	0	0	0	0	67	0
Guangzhou Evergrande	2019	Chinese Super League	10	0	2	0	8	0	-		20	0
Guangzhou Evergrande	2020	Chinese Super League	15	1	1	0	2	0	-		18	1
Guangzhou Evergrande	2021	Chinese Super League	15	0	0	0	0	0	-		15	0
Guangzhou Evergrande	Total		40	1	3	0	10	0	0	0	53	1
Jiangsu Suning (loan)	2019	Chinese Super League	10	0	0	0	-		-		10	0
Wuhan Three Towns	2022	Chinese Super League	28	1	0	0	-		-		28	1
Wuhan Three Towns	2023	Chinese Super League	22	1	2	0	4	1	1	0	29	2
Wuhan Three Towns	2024	Chinese Super League	18	0	0	0	-		-		18	0
Wuhan Three Towns	Total		68	2	2	0	4	1	1	0	75	3
Career total			182	3	8	0	14	1	1	0	205	4

=== International statistics ===
National team
Year	Apps	Goals
2017	2	0
2018	3	0
2019	2	0
Total	7	0

== Honours ==
Guangzhou Evergrande

- Chinese Super League: 2019

Wuhan Three Towns

- Chinese Super League: 2022
- Chinese FA Super Cup: 2023
