= Zhong Yihao =

Chinese footballer

Zhong Yihao 钟义浩
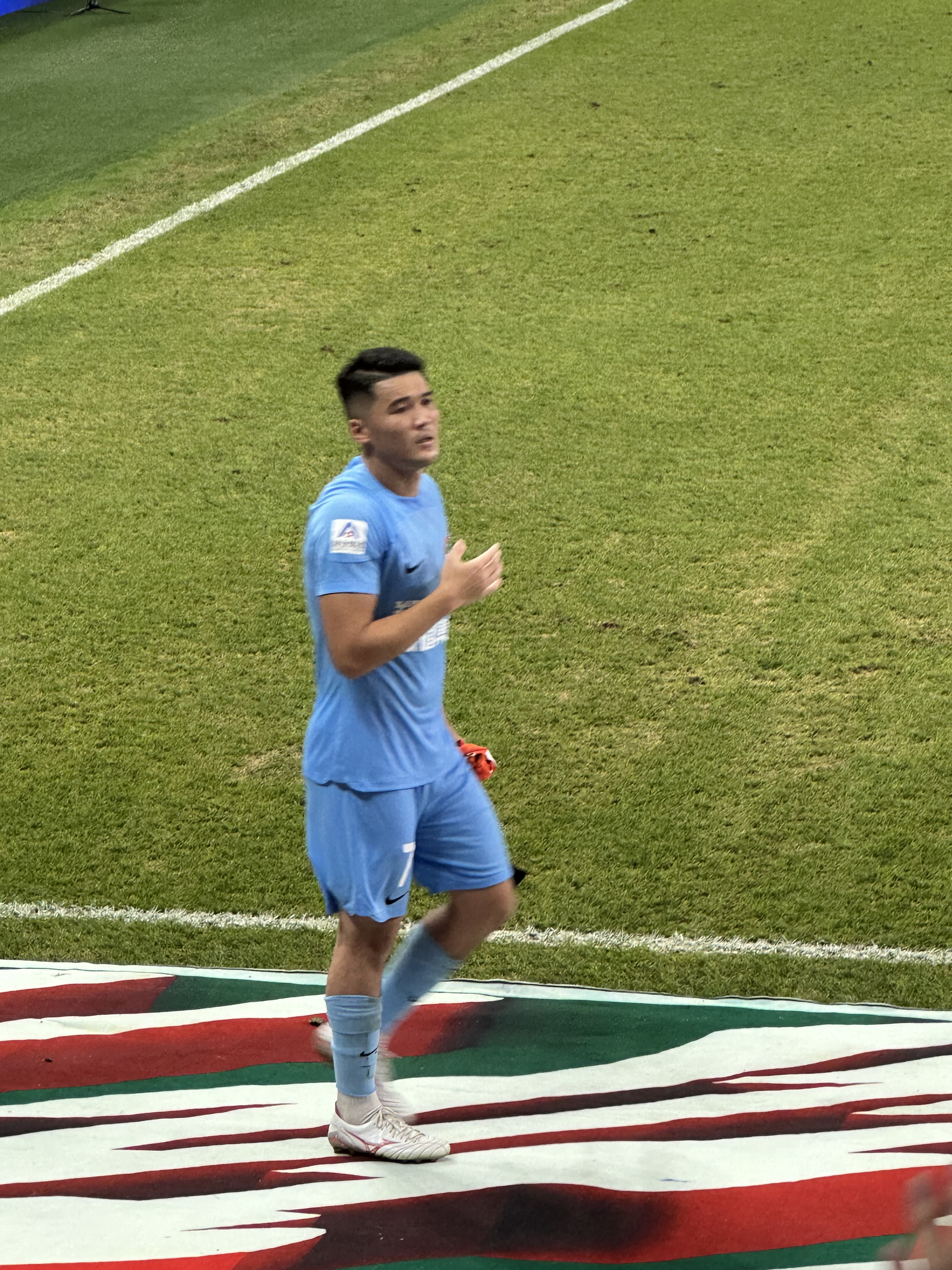
- Zhong Yihao in August 2024

Personal information
- Full name: Zhong Yihao
- Date of birth: 23 March 1996 (age 30)
- Place of birth: Qingdao, Shandong, China
- Height: 1.78 m (5 ft 10 in)
- Positions: Winger; full-back

Team information
- Current team: Henan FC
- Number: 7

Youth career
- Qingdao Jonoon

Senior career*
Years	Team	Apps	(Gls)
2015–2017	Qingdao Jonoon	68	(7)
2018–2021	Guangzhou FC	54	(2)
2022–	Henan FC	124	(18)

International career
2026–	China	2	(0)
- * Club domestic league appearances and goals as of 22 November 2026

Zhong Yihao (Chinese: 钟义浩; pinyin: Zhōng Yìhào; born 23 March 1996) is a Chinese footballer who plays for Henan FC in the Chinese Super League and the China national team.

== Club career ==
Zhong Yihao started his professional football career in 2015 when he was promoted to China League One side Qingdao Jonoon's first team squad. On 4 April 2015, he made his senior debut in a 0–0 home draw against Nei Mongol Zhongyou, coming on as a substitute for Jorge Claros in the 82nd minute. On 13 June 2015, he scored his first senior goal in a 2–1 away win over Shenzhen. Zhong scored four goals in 21 appearances and won the Youth player of the season in the 2017 China League Two season.

Zhong transferred to Chinese Super League side Guangzhou Evergrande Taobao in February 2018. On 25 April 2018, he made his debut for the club in a 1–0 away win over Yinchuan Helanshan in the 2018 Chinese FA Cup. On 2 May 2018, Zhong played in another FA Cup match against Guizhou Hengfeng where he came on for Zhang Wenzhao in the 72nd minute. On 20 May 2018, he made his Super League debut in a 2–0 away loss to Beijing Renhe, coming on as a substitute for Zhang Wenzhao in the 77th minute. On 18 July 2018, he was sent off in the stoppage time for unsporting behaviour in his second Super League appearance against Guizhou Hengfeng. He would go on to establish himself as a regular within the team and go on to win the 2019 Chinese Super League title with the club.

On 25 April 2022, he joined fellow top tier club Henan Songshan Longmen (now known as Henan) for the start of the 2022 Chinese Super League. This would be followed by his debut appearance for the club on 4 June 2022 in a league game against Dalian Professional in a 2–2 draw. After establishing himself as an integral member of the team he would score his first goal for the club on 3 July 2022, which was in a league game against Zhejiang Professional in a 1–0 victory.

== International career ==
On 24 September 2026, Zhong made his debut for the senior China national team in a friendly against the Maldives.

== Career statistics ==
As of 31 December 2025.

Appearances and goals by club, season and competition
Club	Season	League			National Cup		Continental		Other		Total	
Club	Season	Division	Apps	Goals	Apps	Goals	Apps	Goals	Apps	Goals	Apps	Goals
Qingdao Jonoon	2015	China League One	25	2	3	0	-		-		28	2
Qingdao Jonoon	2016	China League One	22	1	1	1	-		-		23	2
Qingdao Jonoon	2017	China League Two	21	4	2	1	-		-		23	5
Qingdao Jonoon	Total		68	7	6	2	0	0	0	0	74	9
Guangzhou Evergrande	2018	Chinese Super League	8	0	2	0	0	0	0 (Note: Appearances in Chinese FA Super Cup)	0	10	0
Guangzhou Evergrande	2019	Chinese Super League	19	2	1	0	5	0	-		25	2
Guangzhou Evergrande	2020	Chinese Super League	11	0	1	0	4	0	-		16	0
Guangzhou Evergrande	2021	Chinese Super League	16	0	0	0	0	0	-		16	0
Guangzhou Evergrande	Total		54	2	4	0	9	0	0	0	67	2
Henan Songshan Longmen/ Henan	2022	Chinese Super League	32	7	0	0	–		–		32	7
Henan Songshan Longmen/ Henan	2023	Chinese Super League	26	3	2	0	–		-		28	3
Henan Songshan Longmen/ Henan	2024	Chinese Super League	11	0	3	1	–		-		14	1
Henan Songshan Longmen/ Henan	2025	Chinese Super League	26	5	5	1	–		-		31	6
Henan Songshan Longmen/ Henan	Total		95	15	10	2	0	0	0	0	105	17
Career total			217	24	20	4	9	0	0	0	246	28

== Honours ==
=== Club ===
Guangzhou Evergrande

- Chinese Super League: 2019
