= Liu Yiming (footballer) =

Chinese footballer

Liu Yiming 刘奕鸣
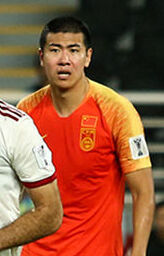

Personal information
- Full name: Liu Yiming
- Date of birth: 28 February 1995 (age 31)
- Place of birth: Shenyang, Liaoning, China
- Height: 1.90 m (6 ft 3 in)
- Position: Centre-back

Team information
- Current team: Wuhan Three Towns
- Number: 19

Youth career
- 2006–2012: Dalian Yiteng
- 2012–2014: Sporting CP

Senior career*
| Years | Team | Apps | (Gls) |
| 2013 | → Liaoning Youth (loan) | 0 | (0) |
| 2014–2016 | Sporting B | 1 | (0) |
| 2015–2016 | → Pinhalnovense (loan) | 16 | (0) |
| 2016–2018 | Tianjin Quanjian | 74 | (1) |
| 2019–2021 | Guangzhou FC | 5 | (0) |
| 2019 | → Shenzhen FC (loan) | 11 | (0) |
| 2021 | → Wuhan Three Towns (loan) | 17 | (0) |
| 2022– | Wuhan Three Towns | 89 | (2) |

International career^{‡}
| 2013–2014 | China U-19 | 13 | (1) |
| 2015–2018 | China U-23 | 22 | (1) |
| 2017– | China | 13 | (0) |
Medal record
Representing China
Men's football
EAFF Championship
| Bronze medal – third place | 2017 Japan | Team |
- * Club domestic league appearances and goals as of 22 November 2026 ‡ National team caps and goals as of 1 December 2019

Liu Yiming
- Simplified Chinese: 刘奕鸣
- Traditional Chinese: 劉奕鳴
Transcriptions
Standard Mandarin
- Hanyu Pinyin: Liú Yìmíng
- IPA: [ljǒʊ î mǐŋ]

Liu Yiming (Chinese: 刘奕鸣; pinyin: Liú Yìmíng; born 28 February 1995) is a Chinese footballer who currently plays as a centre-back for Wuhan Three Towns.

== Club career ==
Liu started his football career when he joined Dalian Yiteng's youth academy in 2006. He went on trial with Sporting CP's youth academy in 2012 and joined soon after. In March 2013, he was loaned to China League Two club Liaoning Youth. In December 2013, Liu signed a professional contract with Sporting B until 2019. He made his debut for the club in 0–0 draw against C.D. Aves, receiving two yellows and was sent off in the 43rd minute.

On 1 February 2016, Liu transferred to China League One side Tianjin Quanjian. In his debut season with the club he would go on to establish himself as a regular within the team and helped them win the division title as well as promotion to the top tier at the end of the 2016 China League One season. In the top tier for the first time with the club, he scored his first goal for them on 1 April 2017 in a 1–0 home win against Henan Jianye; however, he was sent off in the 94th minute after receiving two yellow cards. Despite his indiscretion he would play a vital part in the team that qualified for 2018 AFC Champions League, where he helped guide them to a quarter-finals where they lost to Kashima Antlers in their first attempt in the competition.

On 7 February 2019, Liu transferred to fellow Chinese Super League side Guangzhou. On 1 March 2019, he made his debut for the club in a 3–0 home win against Tianjin Tianhai. On 19 July 2019, Liu was loaned out to fellow top tier side Shenzhen for the remainder of the 2019 season. The following season he would be used even more sparingly at Guangzhou and would go on to be loaned out to second tier club Wuhan Three Towns in the 2021 China League One campaign. The move would turn out to be a big successes and he would go on to establish himself as a vital member of the team and help aid the club to win the league title and gain promotion as the club entered the top tier for the first time in their history. The following campaign Wuhan would make the move permanent and he would be part of the squad that won the 2022 Chinese Super League title.

== International career ==
Liu was called up to the Chinese national team by then manager Marcello Lippi for the first time in November 2017 for the 2017 EAFF E-1 Football Championship. He made his international debut on 9 December 2017 in a 2–2 draw against South Korea.

== Career statistics ==
=== Club ===
As of 1 January 2026.

Appearances and goals by club, season and competition
| Club | Season | League | | | National Cup | | Continental | | Other | | Total | |
| Club | Season | Division | Apps | Goals | Apps | Goals | Apps | Goals | Apps | Goals | Apps | Goals |
|---|---|---|---|---|---|---|---|---|---|---|---|---|
| Liaoning Youth (loan) | 2013 | China League Two | 0 | 0 | - | | - | | - | | 0 | 0 |
| Sporting B | 2012–13 | Segunda Liga | 0 | 0 | - | | - | | - | | 0 | 0 |
| Sporting B | 2013–14 | Segunda Liga | 1 | 0 | - | | - | | - | | 1 | 0 |
| Sporting B | 2014–15 | Segunda Liga | 0 | 0 | - | | - | | - | | 0 | 0 |
| Sporting B | Total | | 1 | 0 | 0 | 0 | 0 | 0 | 0 | 0 | 1 | 0 |
| Pinhalnovense (loan) | 2015–16 | Campeonato de Portugal | 16 | 0 | 0 | 0 | - | | - | | 16 | 0 |
| Tianjin Quanjian | 2016 | China League One | 23 | 0 | 1 | 0 | - | | - | | 24 | 0 |
| Tianjin Quanjian | 2017 | Chinese Super League | 28 | 1 | 0 | 0 | - | | - | | 28 | 1 |
| Tianjin Quanjian | 2018 | Chinese Super League | 23 | 0 | 2 | 0 | 10 | 0 | - | | 35 | 0 |
| Tianjin Quanjian | Total | | 74 | 1 | 3 | 0 | 10 | 0 | 0 | 0 | 87 | 1 |
| Guangzhou Evergrande | 2019 | Chinese Super League | 5 | 0 | 2 | 0 | 0 | 0 | - | | 7 | 0 |
| Guangzhou Evergrande | 2020 | Chinese Super League | 0 | 0 | 0 | 0 | 2 | 0 | - | | 2 | 0 |
| Guangzhou Evergrande | Total | | 5 | 0 | 2 | 0 | 2 | 0 | 0 | 0 | 9 | 0 |
| Shenzhen (loan) | 2019 | Chinese Super League | 11 | 0 | 0 | 0 | - | | - | | 11 | 0 |
| Wuhan Three Towns (loan) | 2021 | China League One | 17 | 0 | 1 | 0 | - | | - | | 18 | 0 |
| Wuhan Three Towns | 2022 | Chinese Super League | 24 | 1 | 1 | 0 | - | | - | | 25 | 1 |
| Wuhan Three Towns | 2023 | Chinese Super League | 26 | 1 | 2 | 0 | 4 | 0 | 1 (Note: Appearances in Chinese FA Super Cup) | 0 | 33 | 1 |
| Wuhan Three Towns | 2024 | Chinese Super League | 10 | 0 | 1 | 0 | - | | - | | 11 | 0 |
| Wuhan Three Towns | 2025 | Chinese Super League | 19 | 0 | 0 | 0 | - | | - | | 19 | 0 |
| Wuhan Three Towns | Total | | 79 | 2 | 4 | 0 | 4 | 0 | 1 | 0 | 88 | 2 |
| Career total | | | 203 | 3 | 10 | 0 | 16 | 0 | 1 | 0 | 230 | 3 |

=== International ===
National team
| Year | Apps | Goals |
|---|---|---|
| 2017 | 3 | 0 |
| 2018 | 7 | 0 |
| 2019 | 3 | 0 |
| Total | 13 | 0 |

== Honours ==
Tianjin Quanjian

- China League One: 2016

Guangzhou Evergrande

- Chinese Super League: 2019

Wuhan Three Towns

- Chinese Super League: 2022
- China League One: 2021
- Chinese FA Super Cup: 2023
