= Yan Dinghao =

Chinese footballer

Yan Dinghao 严鼎皓
Personal information
- Full name: Yan Dinghao
- Date of birth: 6 April 1998 (age 28)
- Place of birth: Mianyang, Sichuan, China
- Height: 1.80 m (5 ft 11 in)
- Position: Midfielder

Team information
- Current team: Liaoning Tieren
- Number: 8

Youth career
- 2012–2016: Hangzhou Greentown
- 2016–2018: Porto

Senior career*
Years	Team	Apps	(Gls)
2017–2019	Porto B	0	(0)
2018	→ Salgueiros (loan)	12	(3)
2018–2019	→ Arouca (loan)	0	(0)
2019	Gondomar	0	(0)
2019	→ Guangzhou Evergrande (loan)	8	(2)
2019–2022	Guangzhou FC	70	(5)
2023	Wuhan Three Towns	29	(1)
2024–2025	Chengdu Rongcheng	41	(3)
2026–	Liaoning Tieren	26	(1)

International career^{‡}
2014–2016	China U-16	23	(4)
2017–2018	China U-19	14	(3)
2019	China U-23	3	(0)
- * Club domestic league appearances and goals as of 22 November 2026 ‡ National team caps and goals as of 11 August 2019

Yan Dinghao (simplified Chinese: 严鼎皓; traditional Chinese: 嚴鼎皓; pinyin: Yán Dǐnghào; born 6 April 1998) is a Chinese footballer who currently plays for Chinese Super League side Liaoning Tieren.

== Club career ==
Yan Dinghao would play for the Hangzhou Greentown youth team before he joined Portuguese club Porto's youth team on 5 August 2016 with a three-year contract. He would work his way up through the youth teams and was promoted to the Porto B team, the reserve side who are allowed to participate within the Portuguese football league pyramid, however he was loaned to third tier football club Salgueiros to gain more playing time. On 7 February 2018, Yan made his senior debut in a league game for Salgueiros against Freamunde in 3-1 defeat. At the end of the season, Yan would go on to have moves with other Portuguese teams in Arouca and Gondomar before returning to China when he joined top tier club Guangzhou Evergrande on 28 February 2019, initially on a loan. On 6 April 2019, Yan would make his debut for the team in a league game against Guangzhou R&F that ended in a 2-0 victory. As the season went on he would become a regular within the team and would go on to win the 2019 Chinese Super League title with the club.

On 4 April 2023, he joined fellow top tier club Wuhan Three Towns.

On 11 January 2026, Yan joined fellow top tier club Liaoning Tieren.

== Career statistics ==
As of 6 December 2023

Club	Season	League			Cup		Continental		Other		Total	
Club	Season	Division	Apps	Goals	Apps	Goals	Apps	Goals	Apps	Goals	Apps	Goals
Porto B	2017–18	LigaPro	0	0	0	0	–		–		0	0
Salgueiros (loan)	2017–18	Campeonato de Portugal	12	3	0	0	–		–		12	3
Arouca (loan)	2018–19	LigaPro	0	0	0	0	–		–		0	0
Gondomar	2018–19	Campeonato de Portugal	0	0	0	0	–		–		0	0
Guangzhou Evergrande (loan)	2019	Chinese Super League	8	2	2	0	1 (Note: Appearances in the AFC Champions League)	0	–		11	2
Guangzhou Evergrande/ Guangzhou FC	2019	Chinese Super League	7	2	0	0	0	0	–		7	2
Guangzhou Evergrande/ Guangzhou FC	2020	Chinese Super League	11	0	1	0	1	0	–		13	0
Guangzhou Evergrande/ Guangzhou FC	2021	Chinese Super League	20	0	0	0	0	0	–		20	0
Guangzhou Evergrande/ Guangzhou FC	2022	Chinese Super League	32	3	0	0	0	0	–		32	3
Guangzhou Evergrande/ Guangzhou FC	Total		70	5	1	0	1	0	0	0	72	5
Wuhan Three Towns	2023	Chinese Super League	29	1	2	0	6	0	1 (Note: Appearances in the Chinese FA Super Cup)	0	38	1
Career total			119	11	5	0	8	0	1	0	133	11

== Honours ==
Guangzhou Evergrande

- Chinese Super League: 2019

Wuhan Three Towns

- Chinese FA Super Cup: 2023
