= 2019 Tianjin Tianhai F.C. season =

Tianjin Tianhai
2019 season
- Chairman: Shen Xiangfu
- Stadium: Tianjin Olympic Center Stadium
- FA Cup: Quarter-finals
- Highest home attendance: 31,317
- Lowest home attendance: 5,073
- Average home league attendance: 16,907

The 2019 Tianjin Tianhai F.C. season is Tianjin Tianhai's 3rd consecutive season in the Chinese Super League ever since it started back in the 2004 season and 3rd consecutive season in the top flight of Chinese football. This season Tianjin Tianhai participates in the Chinese Super League and Chinese FA Cup.

== Squad ==
=== First team squad ===
As of 1 March 2019

Note: Flags indicate national team as defined under FIFA eligibility rules; some limited exceptions apply. Players may hold more than one non-FIFA nationality.

No.	Pos.	Nation	Player
1	GK	CHN	Zhang Lu (Captain)
2	MF	CHN	Wu Wei
3	DF	CHN	Wang Jie
5	DF	CHN	Zhang Chenglin (on loan from Guangzhou Evergrande)
6	MF	CHN	Pei Shuai
7	FW	BRA	Alan (on loan from Guangzhou Evergrande)
8	MF	CHN	Yao Junsheng (on loan from Shandong Luneng)
9	FW	CHN	Yang Xu
10	FW	BRA	Alexandre Pato
11	MF	BRA	Renatinho (on loan from Guangzhou R&F)
12	DF	CHN	Yan Zihao
15	DF	CHN	Wen Jiabao (on loan from Guangzhou Evergrande)
16	MF	CHN	Zheng Dalun
17	MF	CHN	Zhang Xiaobin (on loan from Jiangsu Suning)
18	DF	CHN	Zhang Cheng

No.	Pos.	Nation	Player
19	MF	CHN	Wang Xiaolong
20	MF	CHN	Zhang Yuan
21	DF	KOR	Kwon Kyung-won
22	GK	CHN	Fang Jingqi
23	DF	CHN	Qian Yumiao
25	DF	CHN	Mi Haolun
26	MF	CHN	Liao Lisheng (on loan from Guangzhou Evergrande)
30	MF	CHN	Song Boxuan
31	DF	CHN	Wen Junjie
32	GK	CHN	Sun Qibin
33	DF	CHN	Chu Jinzhao
35	GK	CHN	Ma Zhen
38	MF	CHN	Sun Ke
39	MF	CHN	Wang Yongpo

=== Reserve squad ===
As of 16 July 2018

Note: Flags indicate national team as defined under FIFA eligibility rules; some limited exceptions apply. Players may hold more than one non-FIFA nationality.

No.	Pos.	Nation	Player
24	DF	CHN	Pan Ximing
42	DF	CHN	Bi Guangfu
43	MF	CHN	Dai Chunlei
45	MF	CHN	Sun Ze
46	DF	CHN	Yang Junshan
47	FW	CHN	Ning Zhiwei
48	DF	CHN	Li Chunsheng
49	GK	CHN	Xu Enze
50	MF	CHN	Pang Chuntao
51	DF	CHN	Lu Jiawei
52	MF	CHN	Li Qinghao

No.	Pos.	Nation	Player
53	MF	CHN	Sun Xuelong
54	DF	CHN	Xu Dongshu
55	MF	CHN	Cui Jiaqi
57	DF	CHN	Zulpikar Dolqun
58	MF	CHN	He Youzu
59	DF	CHN	Li Yu
61	DF	CHN	Li Minghao
62	MF	CHN	Liu Zhenhong
—	GK	CHN	Yang Jun
—	MF	CHN	Liu Yi
—	FW	BRA	Geuvânio

== Squad statistics ==
=== Appearances and goals ===
As of 1 March 2019

No.	Pos	Nat	Player	Total		Super League		FA Cup	
No.	Pos	Nat	Player	Apps	Goals	Apps	Goals	Apps	Goals
1	GK	(China) CHN	Zhang Lu	0	0	0	0	0	0
2	MF	(China) CHN	Wu Wei	0	0	0	0	0	0
3	DF	(China) CHN	Wang Jie	0	0	0	0	0	0
5	DF	(China) CHN	Zhang Chenglin	1	0	1	0	0	0
6	MF	(China) CHN	Pei Shuai	1	0	1	0	0	0
7	FW	(Brazil) BRA	Alan	1	0	1	0	0	0
8	MF	(China) CHN	Yao Junsheng	1	0	1	0	0	0
9	FW	(China) CHN	Yang Xu	1	0	1	0	0	0
10	FW	(Brazil) BRA	Alexandre Pato	0	0	0	0	0	0
11	MF	(Brazil) BRA	Renatinho	1	0	1	0	0	0
12	DF	(China) CHN	Yan Zihao	0	0	0	0	0	0
15	DF	(China) CHN	Wen Jiabao	0	0	0	0	0	0
16	MF	(China) CHN	Zheng Dalun	1	0	1	0	0	0
17	MF	(China) CHN	Zhang Xiaobin	1	0	1	0	0	0
18	DF	(China) CHN	Zhang Cheng	1	0	1	0	0	0
19	MF	(China) CHN	Wang Xiaolong	0	0	0	0	0	0
20	MF	(China) CHN	Zhang Yuan	0	0	0	0	0	0
21	DF	(South Korea) KOR	Kwon Kyung-won	1	0	1	0	0	0
22	GK	(China) CHN	Fang Jingqi	1	0	1	0	0	0
23	DF	(China) CHN	Qian Yumiao	0	0	0	0	0	0
25	DF	(China) CHN	Mi Haolun	1	0	1	0	0	0
26	MF	(China) CHN	Liao Lisheng	0	0	0	0	0	0
30	MF	(China) CHN	Song Boxuan	1	0	1	0	0	0
31	DF	(China) CHN	Wen Junjie	0	0	0	0	0	0
32	GK	(China) CHN	Sun Qibin	0	0	0	0	0	0
33	DF	(China) CHN	Chu Jinzhao	0	0	0	0	0	0
35	GK	(China) CHN	Ma Zhen	0	0	0	0	0	0
38	MF	(China) CHN	Sun Ke	0	0	0	0	0	0
39	MF	(China) CHN	Wang Yongpo	1	0	1	0	0	0
Players transferred out during the season

=== Disciplinary record ===
As of match played unknown

No.	Pos	Nat	Player	Super League			FA Cup			Total		
No.	Pos	Nat	Player	Yellow card	Second yellow card	Red card	Yellow card	Second yellow card	Red card	Yellow card	Second yellow card	Red card
				0	0	0	0	0	0	0	0	0
Total				0	0	0	0	0	0	0	0	0

== Competitions ==
=== Chinese Super League ===
==== Table ====
Pos	Team	Pld	W	D	L	GF	GA	GD	Pts	Qualification or relegation
12	Guangzhou R&F	30	9	5	16	54	72	−18	32	
13	Shanghai Greenland Shenhua	30	8	6	16	43	57	−14	30	Qualification for AFC Champions League group stage (Note: Shanghai Greenland Shenhua qualified for the AFC Champions League group stage as Chinese FA Cup winners.)
14	Tianjin Tianhai (D)	30	4	13	13	40	53	−13	25	Dissolved at May 2020 after season 2019
15	Shenzhen F.C.	30	4	9	17	31	57	−26	21	
16	Beijing Renhe (R)	30	3	5	22	26	65	−39	14	Relegation to China League One

Source: CSL
Rules for classification:
- During season: 1) Points; 2) Goal difference; 3) Goals scored.
- After season: 1) Points; 2) Head-to-head points; 3) Head-to-head goal difference; 4) Head-to-head goals scored; 5) Scores of the weight ratio of the reserve league and youth leagues.
  (D) Disqualified; (R) Relegated
  Notes:

==== Results summary ====
Overall								Home						Away					
Pld	W	D	L	GF	GA	GD	Pts	W	D	L	GF	GA	GD	W	D	L	GF	GA	GD
30	4	13	13	40	53	−13	25	3	8	4	25	26	−1	1	5	9	15	27	−12

Last updated: 1 December 2019.
Source: League table

==== Results by round ====
Round	1	2	3	4	5	6	7	8	9	10	11	12	13	14	15	16	17	18	19	20	21	22	23	24	25	26	27	28	29	30
Ground	A	A	H	A	H	A	H	H	A	A	A	H	H	A	H	H	H	A	A	H	A	A	H	A	H	H	H	A	H	A
Result	L	L	L	D	D	D	W	D	L	L	L	L	D	D	D	L	D	L	D	W	D	D	D	L	L	W	D	L	W	L
Position	15	15	16	15	16	16	11	12	14	14	16	16	16	16	16	16	16	16	15	14	14	15	15	15	15	14	14	14	14	14

First match(es) will be played on 1 March 2019. Source: Competitive matches
A = Away; H = Home; W = Win; D = Draw; L = Loss

==== Matches ====
All times are local (UTC+8).

1 March 2019 1	Guangzhou Evergrande Taobao	3–0	Tianjin Tianhai	Guangzhou
19:35	Wei Shihao 23'; Fang Jingqi 36' (o.g.); Feng Xiaoting 66'	Report (CSL); Report (Sina Sports)		Stadium: Tianhe Stadium; Attendance: 47,692; Referee: Mark Clattenburg (England)

10 March 2019 2	Shenzhen F.C.	2–1	Tianjin Tianhai	Shenzhen
17:30	Jin Qiang (yellow card) 46'; Preciado 90+1' (pen.); Zhang Yuan 90+4'	Report	Renatinho 3'; Pei Shuai (yellow card) 28'; Mi Haolun (red card) 88'	Stadium: Shenzhen Universiade Sports Centre; Attendance: 15,236; Referee: (Serbia) Milorad Mažić

31 March 2019 3	Tianjin Tianhai	2–4	Shandong Luneng Taishan	Tianjin
16:30 UTC+8	Zheng Dalun 36'; Zhang Cheng (yellow card) 44'; Yang Xu 90+1'	Report	Wu Xinghan 7'; Li Hailong (yellow card) 51'; Pellè 61' (pen.); Zhou Haibin 64'; Zhang Chi 68'; Dai Lin (yellow card) 74'	Stadium: Tianjin Olympic Center; Attendance: 31,317; Referee: (England) Mark Clattenburg

6 April 2019 4	Tianjin Tianhai	0–0	Hebei China Fortune	Tianjin
16:30 UTC+8		Report	Ren Hang (yellow card) 82'	Stadium: Tianjin Olympic Center; Attendance: 25,016; Referee: (China) Shen Yinhao

14 April 2019 5	Tianjin TEDA	1–1	Tianjin Tianhai	Tianjin
19:35 UTC+8	Johnathan 62' (yellow card) 90+2'; Hui Jiakang (yellow card) 90+2'	Report	Alan 38'; Zheng Dalun (yellow card) 87'; Zhang Lu (yellow card) 90+2'; Kwon Kyung-won (yellow card) 90+2'	Stadium: Tianjin Olympic Center; Attendance: 31,243; Referee: (Serbia) Milorad Mažić

19 April 2019 6	Tianjin Tianhai	0–0	Shanghai SIPG	Tianjin
20:35 UTC+8	Wang Yongpo (yellow card) 45+1'; Mi Haolun (yellow card) 59'	Report	Yu Hai (yellow card) 17'; Wei Zhen (yellow card) 67'; Hulk (yellow card) 90+4'	Stadium: Tianjin Olympic Center; Attendance: 20,314; Referee: (China) Zhang Lei (referee)

27 April 2019 7	Shanghai Greenland Shenhua	2–3	Tianjin Tianhai	Shanghai
20:35 UTC+8	Wang Wei (red card) 11'; Zhu Chenjie (yellow card) 31' (goal) 64'; Wu Yizhen 72'; Sun Shilin (yellow card) 79'; Guarín (yellow card) 90'	Report	Zhang Xiaobin (yellow card) 20'; Zheng Dalun 21' (yellow card) 56'; Kwon Kyung-won (yellow card) 41'; Mi Haolun (yellow card) 62'; Alan 69' 81'; Zhang Chenglin (yellow card) 90+9'	Stadium: Hongkou Football Stadium; Attendance: 20,714; Referee: (England) Mark Clattenburg

5 May 2019 8	Tianjin Tianhai	3–3	Chongqing Dangdai Lifan	Tianjin
20:35 UTC+8	Wang Yongpo 46' (yellow card) 80'; Alan 73' (pen.); Jiang Zhe 90' (o.g.); Wen Jiabao (red card) 90+6'	Report	Yuan Mincheng (yellow card) 10' (goal) 90+3'; Yin Congyao 33'; Feng Jing 37'; Sui Weijie (yellow card) 62'; Jiang Zhe (yellow card) 72'	Stadium: Tianjin Olympic Center; Attendance: 20,024; Referee: (China) Wang Di (referee)

12 May 2019 9	Tianjin Tianhai	1–2	Guangzhou R&F	Tianjin
16:30 UTC+8	Sun Ke 64'	Report	Zahavi 25'; Zhang Gong (yellow card) 58'; Yi Teng (yellow card) 66'; Saba 78'; Dembélé (yellow card) 82'	Stadium: Tianjin Olympic Center; Attendance: 10,400; Referee: (Australia) Jonathon Barreiro

17 May 2019 10	Beijing Sinobo Guoan	2–1	Tianjin Tianhai	Beijing
20:35 UTC+8	Yu Dabao 38'; Nico Yennaris (yellow card) 53' (goal) 72'	Report	Zheng Dalun (yellow card) 40'; Mi Haolun (yellow card) 70'; Yang Xu 89'	Stadium: Workers' Stadium; Attendance: 37,118; Referee: (Australia) Jonathon Barreiro

26 May 2019 11	Wuhan Zall	2–1	Tianjin Tianhai	Wuhan
19:35 UTC+8	Léo Baptistão 18'; Kouassi 79'	Report	Pei Shuai (yellow card) 76'; Renatinho 90+5'	Stadium: Dongxihu Sports Centre; Attendance: 15,189; Referee: (Serbia) Milorad Mažić

1 June 2019 12	Beijing Renhe	2–0	Tianjin Tianhai	Beijing
20:35 UTC+8	Zhang Cheng 16' (o.g.); Luo Xin (yellow card) 41'; Diop 69'; Wang Xuanhong (yellow card) 90+2'	Report	Wen Junjie (yellow card) 37'	Stadium: Beijing Fengtai Stadium; Attendance: 8,132; Referee: (England) Mark Clattenburg

16 June 2019 13	Tianjin Tianhai	1–1	Henan Jianye	Tianjin
20:35 UTC+8	Wang Yongpo 19'	Report	Ohandza 58'; Lu Yao (yellow card) 79'	Stadium: Tianjin Olympic Center; Attendance: 5,073; Referee: (China) Huang Yejun

23 June 2019 14	Dalian Yifang	2–2	Tianjin Tianhai	Dalian
16:30 UTC+8	Qin Sheng (yellow card) 5'; Boateng 33' 41' (pen.); Zheng Long (yellow card) 67'; He Yupeng (yellow card) 90+4'	Report	Sun Ke 8'; Yang Xu (yellow card) 40'; Boateng 62' (o.g.)	Stadium: Dalian Sports Center Stadium; Attendance: 21,099; Referee: (England) Mark Clattenburg

30 June 2019 15	Tianjin Tianhai	2–2	Jiangsu Suning	Tianjin
20:35 UTC+8	Alan 2'; Zheng Dalun (yellow card) 26'; Zhang Xiaobin (yellow card) 32'; Liao Lisheng (yellow card) 58'; Wu Wei (yellow card) 62'; Renatinho 66'; Yang Xu (yellow card) 90+5'	Report	Paletta (yellow card) 45+1'; Alex Teixeira 49' (pen.); Wu Xi (yellow card) 86'; Zhang Lingfeng 89'	Stadium: Tianjin Olympic Center; Attendance: 23,578; Referee: (China) Shen Yinhao

5 July 2019 16	Tianjin Tianhai	1–3	Guangzhou Evergrande Taobao	Tianjin
20:35 UTC+8	Yang Xu 5'	Report	Yan Dinghao 16'; Park Ji-soo (yellow card) 33'; Gao Zhunyi (yellow card) 48'; Paulinho 68'; Liu Shibo (yellow card) 89'; Xu Xin 90+2'	Stadium: Tianjin Olympic Center; Attendance: 16,759; Referee: (Serbia) Milorad Mažić

13 July 2019 17	Tianjin Tianhai	2–2	Shenzhen	Tianjin
20:35 UTC+8	Renatinho 45'; Yao Junsheng 51'	Report	Mary 31' (yellow card) 62' (goal) 79'; Qiao Wei (yellow card) 67'; Ge Zhen (yellow card) 81'; M'Bengue (yellow card) 90+4'; Guo Wei (yellow card) 90+8'	Stadium: Tianjin Olympic Center; Attendance: 16,657; Referee: (China) Ma Ning (referee)

17 July 2019 18	Shandong Luneng Taishan	2–1	Tianjin Tianhai	Jinan
20:35 UTC+8	Pellè 36'; Liu Binbin 45+2'	Report	Alan 90+2'	Stadium: Jinan Olympic Sports Center Stadium; Attendance: 17,426; Referee: (Serbia) Milorad Mažić

21 July 2019 19	Hebei China Fortune	2–2	Tianjin Tianhai	Langfang
20:35 UTC+8	Zhang Chengdong (yellow card) 41'; Dong Xuesheng 54'; Fernandinho 84'	Report	Leonardo 49'; Pei Shuai (yellow card) 89'; Renatinho 90+2'; Yang Xu (yellow card) 90+6'	Stadium: Langfang Stadium; Attendance: 16,529; Referee: (England) Mark Clattenburg

28 July 2019 20	Tianjin Tianhai	1–0	Tianjin TEDA	Tianjin
20:35 UTC+8	Zhang Chenglin (yellow card) 28'; Yao Junsheng 55' (yellow card) 82'; Zhang Cheng (yellow card) 79'; Liao Lisheng (yellow card) 88'; Wang Xiaolong (yellow card) 90+4'	Report	Rong Hao (yellow card) 3'; Yang Fan (yellow card) 60'; Johnathan (yellow card) 90'	Stadium: Tianjin Olympic Center; Attendance: 27,792; Referee: (China) Zhang Lei (referee)

3 August 2019 21	Shanghai SIPG	0–0	Tianjin Tianhai	Shanghai
21:00 UTC+8	Wang Shenchao (yellow card) 45+1' (yellow-red card) 90+6'; He Guan (yellow card) 72'	Report	Wang Xiaolong (yellow card) 20'; Liao Lisheng (yellow card) 23'; Pei Shuai (yellow card) 87'; Yao Junsheng (yellow card) 90+7'	Stadium: Shanghai Stadium; Attendance: 22,733; Referee: (China) Wang Jin

11 August 2019 22	Chongqing Dangdai Lifan	1–1	Tianjin Tianhai	Chongqing
20:35 UTC+8	Zheng Dalun 28' (o.g.); Chen Lei (yellow card) 70'	Report	Sui Weijie 2' (o.g.); Liu Yi (yellow card) 7'; Wu Wei (yellow card) 79'	Stadium: Chongqing Olympic Sports Center; Attendance: 23,536; Referee: (Serbia) Milorad Mažić

15 August 2019 23	Tianjin Tianhai	2–2	Shanghai Greenland Shenhua	Tianjin
20:35 UTC+8	Renatinho (yellow card) 21' (goal) 72' (pen.); Zhang Chenglin (yellow card) 27'; Wang Xiaolong (yellow card) 42'; Pei Shuai (yellow card) 43'; Yao Junsheng (yellow card) 44'; Yang Xu 49'; Zhang Cheng (yellow card) 90+1'	Report	Sun Kai (yellow card) 10'; Moreno 39'; Cao Yunding (yellow card) 42'; El Shaarawy (yellow card) 48' (goal) 58'	Stadium: Tianjin Olympic Center; Attendance: 11,711; Referee: (China) Gu Chunhan

14 September 2019 24	Guangzhou R&F	2–1	Tianjin Tianhai	Guangzhou
20:35 UTC+8	Zahavi 42' 90'; Yi Teng (yellow card) 45+3'; Chen Zhizhao (yellow card) 70'; Jin Pengxiang (yellow card) 82'	Report	Yang Xu 18'; Zhang Cheng (yellow card) 86'	Stadium: Yuexiushan Stadium; Attendance: 9,013; Referee: (Netherlands) Kevin Blom

22 September 2019 25	Tianjin Tianhai	0–3	Beijing Sinobo Guoan	Tianjin
18:30 UTC+8	Pei Shuai (yellow card) 77'; Zheng Dalun (yellow card) 86'	Report	John Hou Sæter 4'; Zhang Yuning 28'; Zou Dehai (yellow card) 73'; Renato Augusto 90+1'	Stadium: Tianjin Olympic Center Stadium; Attendance: 11,570; Referee: (Japan) Ryuji Sato

18 October 2019 26	Tianjin Tianhai	–	Wuhan Zall	Tianjin
20:35 UTC+8				Attendance: Tianjin Olympic Center Stadium

=== Chinese FA Cup ===
1 May 2019 Round 4	Tianjin Tianhai	2–2 (4–3 p)	Shijiazhuang Ever Bright	Tianjin
20:35	Renatinho 9'; Zhang Chenglin 38'; Wang Jie (yellow card) 75'; Song Boxuan (yellow card) 90'	Report	Muriqui 12'; Liu Xinyu 74'; Zhou Jiahao (yellow card) 89'	Stadium: Tianjin Tuanbo Football Stadium; Attendance: 6,313; Referee: Guan Xing

28 May 2019 Last 16	Tianjin Tianhai	1–0	Taizhou Yuanda	Tianjin
20:35	Yao Junsheng 75'	Report	Wu Hongyang (yellow card) 45+1'; Liu Junpeng (red card) 62'	Stadium: Tianjin Olympic Center; Attendance: 5,093; Referee: Shi Zhenlu

24 July 2019 Quarter Finals	Tianjin Tianhai	0–4	Dalian Yifang	Tianjin
19:00	Wu Wei (yellow card) 77'	Report	Boateng 26' 80' 90+1' (pen.); Sun Bo 42'; Cui Ming'an (yellow card) 55'; Zhou Ting (yellow card) 74'	Stadium: Tianjin Olympic Center; Attendance: 6,187; Referee: (China) Ma Ning (referee)
