= Chinese football transfer records =

This is a list about the most expensive transfer fees paid or received by Chinese football clubs since the professionalism in 1994.

== Highest transfer payments ==
=== All-time ranking ===
As of 8 September 2020

Chinese domestic player

Top 50 most expensive Chinese football transfers
Rank	Player	From	To	Position	Fee (€ mln)	Fee (¥ mln)	Year	Year of birth	Ref
1	(Brazil) Oscar	(England) Chelsea	(China) Shanghai SIPG	Midfielder	€70.4	¥514.6	2017	1991	
2	(Brazil) Hulk	(Russia) Zenit Saint Petersburg	(China) Shanghai SIPG	Forward	€55.8	¥410	2016	1986	
3	(Brazil) Alex Teixeira	(Ukraine) Shakhtar Donetsk	(China) Jiangsu Suning	Midfielder	€50	¥370	2016	1990	
4	(Colombia) Jackson Martínez	(Spain) Atlético Madrid	(China) Guangzhou Evergrande	Forward	€42	¥300	2016	1986	
4	(Brazil) Paulinho	(Spain) Barcelona	(China) Guangzhou Evergrande	Midfielder	€42	¥330	2019	1988	
6	(Brazil) Paulinho	(China) Guangzhou Evergrande	(Spain) Barcelona	Midfielder	€40	¥315	2017	1988	
6	(Democratic Republic of the Congo) Cédric Bakambu	(Spain) Villarreal	(China) Beijing Guoan	Forward	€40	¥315	2018	1991	
8	(France) Anthony Modeste	(Germany) 1. FC Köln	(China) Tianjin Quanjian	Forward	€29	¥220	2018	1988	
9	(Brazil) Ramires	(England) Chelsea	(China) Jiangsu Suning	Midfielder	€28	¥200	2016	1987	
10	(Belgium) Yannick Carrasco	(China) Dalian Professional	(Spain) Atlético Madrid	Midfielder	€27	¥220	2020	1993	
11	(Austria) Marko Arnautović	(England) West Ham United	(China) Shanghai SIPG	Forward	€25	¥190	2019	1989	
12	(Nigeria) Odion Ighalo	(England) Watford	(China) Changchun Yatai	Forward	€23.3	¥170	2017	1989	
13	(China) Zhang Chengdong	(China) Beijing Guoan	Hebei China Fortune	Forward	€20.44	¥150	2017	1989	
14	(Slovakia) Marek Hamšík	(Italy) Napoli	(China) Dalian Yifang	Forward	€20	¥150	2019	1987	
14	(Belgium) Axel Witsel	(Russia) Zenit Saint Petersburg	(China) Tianjin Quanjian	Midfielder	€20	¥145	2017	1989	
14	(Belgium) Axel Witsel	(China) Tianjin Quanjian	(Germany) Borussia Dortmund	Midfielder	€20	¥160	2018	1989	
17	(Brazil) Talisca	(Portugal) Benfica	(China) Guangzhou Evergrande	Forward	€19.2	¥150	2018	1994	
18	(Brazil) Elkeson	(China) Guangzhou Evergrande	(China) Shanghai SIPG	Forward	€18.5	¥130	2016	1989	
19	(Venezuela) Salomón Rondón	(England) West Bromwich Albion	(China) Dalian Yifang	Forward	€18.27	¥140	2019	1989	
20	(Ivory Coast) Gervinho	(Italy) Roma	Hebei China Fortune	Forward	€18	¥130	2016	1987	
20	(Brazil) Alexandre Pato	(Spain) Villarreal	(China) Tianjin Quanjian	Forward	€18	¥130	2017	1989	
22	(China) Zhao Yuhao	(China) Hangzhou Greentown	Hebei China Fortune	Defender	€17.8	¥130	2017	1993	
23	(Italy) Stephan El Shaarawy	(Italy) Roma	(China) Shanghai Shenhua	Forward	€16	¥120	2019	1992	
24	(Italy) Graziano Pellè	(England) Southampton	(China) Shandong Luneng	Forward	€15.25	¥110	2016	1985	
25	(Brazil) Ricardo Goulart	(Brazil) Cruzeiro	(China) Guangzhou Evergrande	Forward	€15	¥110	2015	1991	
25	(Spain) Jonathan Soriano	(Austria) Red Bull Salzburg	(China) Beijing Guoan	Forward	€15	¥110	2017	1985	
27	(Colombia) Roger Martínez	(China) Jiangsu Suning	(Spain) Villarreal	Forward	€14.9	¥115	2016	1994	
28	(Brazil) Paulinho	(England) Tottenham Hotspur	(China) Guangzhou Evergrande	Midfielder	€14	¥95	2015	1988	
29	(Senegal) Demba Ba	(Turkey) Beşiktaş	(China) Shanghai Shenhua	Forward	€13	¥90	2015	1985	
29	(Colombia) Fredy Guarín	(Italy) Inter Milan	(China) Shanghai Shenhua	Forward	€13	¥90	2016	1986	
31	(China) Wang Yongpo	(China) Shandong Luneng	(China) Tianjin Quanjian	Midfielder	€12.44	¥90	2017	1987	
32	(Colombia) Adrián Ramos	(Germany) Borussia Dortmund	(China) Chongqing Lifan	Forward	€12	¥90	2017	1986	
32	(Brazil) Vágner Love	(Russia) CSKA Moscow	(China) Shandong Luneng	Forward	€12	¥100	2013	1984	
32	(Nigeria) Brown Ideye	(Greece) Olympiacos	(China) Tianjin Teda	Forward	€12	¥90	2017	1988	
35	(Nigeria) Anthony Ujah	(Germany) Werder Bremen	(China) Liaoning Whowin	Forward	€11.5	¥85	2016	1990	
35	(China) Cui Min	(China) Yanbian Funde	(China) Shenzhen	Defender	€11.5	¥85	2017	1989	
37	(Brazil) Alan Carvalho	(Austria) Red Bull Salzburg	(China) Guangzhou Evergrande	Forward	€11.1	¥80	2015	1989	
38	(Spain) Jonathan Viera	(Spain) Las Palmas	(China) Beijing Guoan	Midfielder	€11	¥85	2018	1989	
38	(Brazil) Geuvânio	(Brazil) Santos	(China) Tianjin Quanjian	Forward	€11	¥80	2016	1992	
40	(China) Zhao Mingjian	(China) Shandong Luneng	Hebei China Fortune	Defender	€10.95	¥80	2017	1987	
41	(China) Jin Yangyang	(China) Guangzhou R&F	Hebei China Fortune	Defender	€10.83	¥80	2016	1993	
42	(China) Ren Hang	(China) Jiangsu Suning R&F	Hebei China Fortune	Defender	€10.75	¥80	2017	1989	
43	(Belgium) Yannick Carrasco	(Spain) Atlético Madrid	(China) Dalian Yifang	Midfielder	€10.5	¥80	2018	1993	
43	(Argentina) Carlos Tevez	(Argentina) Boca Juniors	(China) Shanghai Shenhua	Forward	€10.5	¥75	2017	1984	
43	(South Korea) Kwon Kyung-won	(United Arab Emirates) Al-Ahli Dubai	(China) Tianjin Quanjian	Defender	€10.5	¥75	2017	1992	
46	(China) Zhang Wenzhao	(China) Shandong Luneng	(China) Guangzhou Evergrande	Forward	€10.4	¥75	2016	1987	
47	(China) Bi Jinhao	(China) Henan Jianye	(China) Shanghai Shenhua	Forward	€9.98	¥70	2016	1991	
48	(China) Zhang Lu	(China) Liaoning Whowin	(China) Tianjin Quanjian	Goalkeeper	€9.8	¥70	2016	1987	
49	(China) Zhang Chenglin	(China) Beijing Renhe	(China) Guangzhou Evergrande	Defender	€9.65	¥70	2017	1987	
50	(Brazil) Fernando	(Russia) Spartak Moscow	(China) Beijing Guoan	Midfielder	€9.6	¥75	2020	1992	

=== Youth domestic players ===
As of 1 March 2020

U-23 player
U-21 player
U-19 player

Top 10 most expensive Chinese youth football transfers
Rank	Player	From	To	Position	Fee (€ mln)	Fee (¥ mln)	Year	Age	Ref
1	(China) Liu Junshuai	(Portugal) União Torreense	(China) Shandong Luneng	Defender	€4.5	¥33	2017	22	
2	(China) Xu Xin	(Spain) Atlético Madrid B	(China) Guangzhou Evergrande	Midfielder	€4.3	¥30	2016	22	
3	(China) Xie Pengfei	(China) Hangzhou Greentown	(China) Jiangsu Suning	Forward	€4.07	¥30	2016	23	
4	(China) Han Pengfei	(Portugal) Mafra	(China) Guangzhou Evergrande	Defender	€4	¥30	2016	23	
4	(China) Huang Jiajun	(Portugal) Oriental Dragon	(China) Jiangsu Suning	Defender	€4	¥30	2017	22	
6	(China) Huang Bowen	(China) Shanghai Shenhua	(China) Wuhan Zall	Defender	€3.4	¥25	2017	21	
7	(China) Tao Qianglong	Hebei China Fortune	(China) Dalian Pro	Midfielder	€2.61	¥20	2020	19	
8	(China) Zhang Xiuwei	(China) Tianjin Tianhai	(China) Guangzhou Evergrande	Midfielder	€2.6	¥20	2019	23	
8	(China) Shi Ke	(China) Hangzhou Greentown	(China) Shanghai SIPG	Defender	€2.6	¥20	2015	22	
10	(China) Wen Junjie	(China) Hangzhou Greentown	(China) Tianjin Quanjian	Defender	€2.55	¥20	2018	21	

=== Goalkeepers ===
As of 1 March 2020

Top 5 most expensive Chinese goalkeeper transfers
Rank	Player	From	To	Fee (€ mln)	Fee (¥ mln)	Year	Year of birth	Ref
1	(China) Zhang Lu	(China) Liaoning Whowin	(China) Tianjin Quanjian	€9.8	¥70	2016	1987	
2	(China) Gu Chao	(China) Hangzhou Greentown	(China) Jiangsu Suning	€7.05	¥50	2016	1989	
3	(China) Liu Dianzuo	(China) Guangzhou R&F	(China) Guangzhou Evergrande Taobao	€6.7	¥50	2016	1990	
4	(China) Wang Dalei	(China) Shanghai Shenhua	(China) Shandong Luneng	€3.5	¥30	2014	1989	
5	(China) Liu Dianzuo	(China) Shanghai Shenxin	(China) Guangzhou R&F	€2.8	¥20	2015	1990	
