= 2011 in Chinese football =

Football in China
- Season: 2011

== National teams competitions ==
=== Men's senior team ===
==== 2011 AFC Asian Cup ====
Team	Pld	W	D	L	GF	GA	GD	Pts
Uzbekistan	3	2	1	0	6	3	+3	7
Qatar	3	2	0	1	5	2	+3	6
China	3	1	1	1	4	4	0	4
Kuwait	3	0	0	3	1	7	−6	0

8 January Group A	China	2–0	Kuwait	Doha, Qatar
16:15 UTC+3	Zhang Linpeng 58'; Deng Zhuoxiang 67'	Report		Stadium: Al Gharafa Stadium; Attendance: 7,423; Referee: Benjamin Williams (Australia); Assistant referees: Benjamin Wilson (Australia); Hakan Anaz (Australia); Fourth official: Alireza Faghani (Iran)

12 January Group A	Qatar	2–0	China	Doha, Qatar
19:15 UTC+3	Ahmed 27', 45+1'	Report		Stadium: Khalifa International Stadium; Attendance: 30,778; Referee: Kim Dong-Jin (South Korea)

16 January Group A	China	2–2	Uzbekistan	Doha, Qatar
19:15 UTC+3	Yu Hai 6'; Hao Junmin 56'	Report	Ahmedov 30'; Geynrikh 47'	Stadium: Al Gharafa Stadium; Attendance: 3,529; Referee: Abdullah Al Hilali (Oman)

==== 2014 FIFA World Cup qualification ====
===== Second round =====
23 July	China	7–2	Laos	Kunming, China PR
15:00 UTC+8	Yang Xu 45+2', 54', 73'; Chen Tao 52', 88'; Hao Junmin 82', 90+1' (pen.)	Report	Vongchiengkham 5'; Phaphouvanin 31'	Stadium: Tuodong Stadium; Attendance: 13,500; Referee: Strebre Delovski (Australia)

28 July	Laos	1–6	China	Vientiane, Laos
18:00 UTC+7	Phapouvanin 47'	Report	Qu Bo 24'; Yu Hanchao 36', 88'; Deng Zhuoxiang 67', 83'; Yang Xu 90+2'	Stadium: New Laos National Stadium; Attendance: 13,000; Referee: Tayeb Shamsuzzaman (Bangladesh)

===== Third round =====
2 September	China	2–1	Singapore	Kunming, China PR
20:00 UTC+8	Zheng Zhi 69' (pen.); Yu Hai 73'	Report	Đurić 33'	Stadium: Tuodong Stadium; Attendance: 17,000; Referee: Andre El Haddad (Lebanon)

6 September	Jordan	2–1	China	Amman, Jordan
19:00 UTC+3	Abdul-Rahman 49'; Amer Deeb 55'	Report	Hao Junmin 57'	Stadium: Amman International Stadium; Attendance: 19,000; Referee: Ravshan Irmatov (Uzbekistan)

11 October	China	0–1	Iraq	Shenzhen, China PR
20:15 UTC+8		Report	Mahmoud 45'	Stadium: Shenzhen Stadium; Attendance: 25,021; Referee: Saeid Mozaffari (Iran)

11 November	Iraq	v	China

15 November	Singapore	v	China	Singapore
19:30 UTC+8				Stadium: Jalan Besar Stadium

==== Friendly matches ====
2 January	China	3–2	Iraq	Doha, Qatar
16:15 UTC+3	Hao Junmin 4'; Zhao Peng 48'; Deng Zhuoxiang 76'		Younis 18', 45+1'	Stadium: Qatar SC Stadium; Attendance: Closed Game

25 March	China	1–1	New Zealand	Wuhan, China PR
19:35 UTC+8	Boyens 2' (o.g.)		McGlinchey 54'	Stadium: Wuhan Sports Center Stadium; Referee: Toma Maasaki (Japan)

26 March	Costa Rica	2–2	China	San José, Costa Rica
20:30 UTC-6	Saborío 38'; Brenes 44'		Gao Lin 47', 90+2'	Stadium: Estadio Nacional de Costa Rica; Attendance: 35,000; Referee: Roberto Moreno Salazar (Panama)

29 March	China	3–0	Honduras	Wuhan, China PR
19:30 UTC+8	Huang Bowen 17'; Yang Xu 37', 86'			Stadium: Wuhan Sports Center Stadium; Referee: Toma Maasaki (Japan)

5 June	China	1–0	Uzbekistan	Kunming, China PR
19:35 UTC+8	Gao Lin 61'			Stadium: Tuodong Stadium; Attendance: 13,500; Referee: Ko Hyung-Jin (South Korea)

8 June	China	2–0	North Korea	Guiyang, China PR
19:35 UTC+8	Deng Zhuoxiang 37'; Gao Lin 39'			Stadium: Guiyang Olympic Sports Center; Attendance: 30,000; Referee: Jumpei Iida (Japan)

10 August	China	1–0	Jamaica	Hefei, China PR
19:35 UTC+8	Zhao Peng 10'			Stadium: Hefei Olympic Sports Center; Referee: Lee Min-Hu (South Korea)

6 September	China	2–1	United Arab Emirates	Shenzhen, China PR
19:45 UTC+8	Sun Xiang 5'; Gao Lin 15'		Al Marzouqi 85'	Stadium: New Shenzhen Stadium; Attendance: 18,652; Referee: Sukhbir Singh (Singapore)

=== Women's senior team ===
==== Four Nations Tournament in China ====
21 January	China	2–3	Canada	Chongqing, China PR
18:35 UTC+8	You Jia 19', 36'		Tancredi 56'; Sinclair 80', 90+3'	Stadium: Yongchuan Sports Center

23 January	China	2–1	Sweden	Chongqing, China PR
16:00 UTC+8	Nilsson 33' (o.g.); You Jia 61'		Öqvist 15'	Stadium: Yongchuan Sports Center

25 January	China	0–2	United States	Chongqing, China PR
18:35 UTC+8			Lloyd 31'; Rodriguez 67'	Stadium: Yongchuan Sports Center

==== 2011 Algarve Cup ====
Team	Pld	W	D	L	GF	GA	GD	Pts
Iceland	3	3	0	0	5	2	+3	9
Sweden	3	2	0	1	5	3	+2	6
Denmark	3	1	0	2	2	4	−2	3
China	3	0	0	3	1	4	−3	0

2 March Group B	China	0–1	Denmark	Ferreiras, Portugal
15:00 UTC+0			Nielsen 1'	Stadium: Desportivo da Nora Park

4 March Group B	China	1–2	Iceland	Albufeira, Portugal
15:00 UTC+0	Ma Jun 21'		M. Viðarsdóttir 27', 50'	Stadium: Municipal Stadium

7 March Group B	China	0–1	Sweden	Olhão, Portugal
15:00 UTC+0			Schelin 62'	Stadium: José Arcanjo Stadium

9 March 7th Place playoff	China	2–1	Wales	Albufeira, Portugal
11:00 UTC+0	You Jia 4'; Gu Yasha 54'		Lander 59'	Stadium: Municipal Stadium

==== 2012 Summer Olympics qualification ====
Key to colours in group tables
Top two teams qualify for the 2012 Summer Olympics

Team	Pld	W	D	L	GF	GA	GD	Pts
Japan	5	4	1	0	8	2	6	13
North Korea	5	3	2	0	10	3	7	11
Australia	5	3	0	2	8	4	4	9
China	5	1	2	2	2	2	0	5
South Korea	5	1	1	3	7	7	0	4
Thailand	5	0	0	5	1	18	−17	0

1 September 1	China	0–0	South Korea	Jinan, China PR
19:00 UTC+8		Report		Stadium: Jinan Olympic Sports Center; Attendance: 8,000; Referee: Albon Teodora (Romania)

3 September 2	China	0–0	North Korea	Jinan, China PR
19:00 UTC+8		Report		Stadium: Shandong Provincial Stadium; Attendance: 10,000; Referee: Kateryna Monzul (Ukraine)

5 September 3	China	2–0	Thailand	Jinan, China PR
19:00 UTC+8	You Jia 40'; Xu Yuan 80'	report		Stadium: Shandong Provincial Stadium; Attendance: 7,160; Referee: Mai Hoàng Trang (Vietnam)

8 September 4	China	0–1	Australia	Jinan, China PR
19:00 UTC+8		report	Emily Louise Van-Egmond 61'	Stadium: Jinan Olympic Sports Center; Attendance: 10,167; Referee: Kirsi Katja Maria Heikkinen (Finland)

11 September 5	China	0–1	Japan	Jinan, China PR
19:00 UTC+8		report	Tanaka Asuna 57'	Stadium: Jinan Olympic Sports Center; Attendance: 7,890; Referee: Silvia Tea Spinelli (Italy)

==== Friendly matches ====
17 April	China	0–1	North Korea	Qingdao, China PR
15:00 UTC+8			Ra Un-Sim 42'	Stadium: Tiantai Stadium

20 May	China	1–0	New Zealand	Weifang, China PR
20:00 UTC+8	You Jia 40'			Stadium: Weifang Sports Center Stadium

22 July	China	2–0	Russia	Changchun, China PR
17:00 UTC+8	Xu Yuan 12'; Qu Shanshan 85'			Stadium: Nanling Stadium

26 July	China	2–2	Russia	Changchun, China PR
15:30 UTC+8	Xu Yuan 2'; You Jia 10'		32'; Wu Min 67' (o.g.)	Stadium: Nanling Stadium

22 August	China	1–1	Netherlands	Hohhot, China PR
19:35 UTC+8	Ma Jun 45'		van de Donk 21'	Stadium: Hohhot Stadium

24 August	China	0–1	Netherlands	Hohhot, China PR
19:30 UTC+8			22'	Stadium: Hohhot Stadium

=== Men's U-23 team ===
==== 2012 Summer Olympics qualification ====
===== Preliminary Round 2 =====
19 June	China	0–1	Oman	Shanghai, China PR
20:00 UTC+8		Report	Al-Hadhri 4'	Stadium: Hongkou Stadium; Attendance: 13,500; Referee: Ben Williams (Australia)

23 June	Oman	3–1	China	Seeb, Oman
18:15 UTC+4	Al-Hadhri 94', 119'; Al Qasmi 114'		Wu Xi 69'	Stadium: Seeb Stadium

==== Friendly matches ====
16 January	Egypt	0–0	China	Cairo, Egypt
19:00 UTC+2

19 January	Kenya	0–2	China	Cairo, Egypt
UTC+2			Zhang Yuan; Lü Wenjun

27 March	South Korea	1–0	China	Ulsan, Korea Republic
15:00 UTC+9	Kim Dong-Sub 14'			Stadium: Ulsan Munsu Football Stadium

3 June	China	1–2	North Korea	Shanghai, China PR
21:00 UTC+8	Li Kai 58'		Ri Jin-Hyok 37'; Kye Song-Hyok 43'	Stadium: Shanghai Stadium; Referee: Tan Hai (China)

6 June	China	0–0	Saudi Arabia	Shanghai, China PR
19:35 UTC+8				Stadium: Hongkou Stadium; Referee: Wang Di (China)

=== Men's U-20 team ===
==== Valentin Granatkin Cup ====
Team	Pld	W	D	L	GF	GA	GD	Pts
China	3	2	0	1	6	2	+4	6
Ukraine	3	1	1	1	4	3	+1	4
Belarus	3	1	1	1	2	4	−2	4
Azerbaijan	3	0	2	1	1	4	−3	2

3 January Group B	China	1–2	Belarus	St. Petersburg, Russia
16:00 UTC+3	Wu Xinghan 11'	Report	Siarhei 9', 47'	Stadium: Petersburg Sports and Concert Complex; Attendance: 1,500; Referee: Kostevich; Assistant referees: Kichimasov; Shimarygin

5 January Group B	China	2–0	Ukraine	St. Petersburg, Russia
12:00 UTC+3	Chen Hao 45'; Wu Xinghan 55'	Report		Stadium: Petersburg Sports and Concert Complex; Attendance: 300; Referee: Kostevich; Assistant referees: Kichimasov; Shimarygin

7 January Group B	China	3–0	Azerbaijan	St. Petersburg, Russia
12:00 UTC+3	Wu Ti 45'; Lin Chuangyi 55'; Chen Hao 61'	Report		Stadium: Petersburg Sports and Concert Complex; Attendance: 500; Referee: Kostevich; Assistant referees: Anoshin; Grechishkin

9 January Final	China	0–2	Finland	St. Petersburg, Russia
17:00 UTC+3		Report	Paananen 84', 88'	Stadium: Petersburg Sports and Concert Complex; Attendance: 4,500; Referee: Shadyhanov; Assistant referees: Abusuev; Milyuchenko

==== 2011 Toulon Tournament ====
Group B

Team	Pld	W	D	L	GF	GA	GD	Pts
France	3	2	1	0	9	2	+7	7
Mexico	3	2	0	1	5	5	0	6
Hungary	3	1	1	1	4	3	+1	4
China	3	0	0	3	1	9	−8	0

2 June Group B	China	0–3	Hungary	Hyères, France
16:45 CEST		Report	Katona 42'; Futács 53'; Eppel 80+1'	Stadium: Stade Perruc; Referee: Andrea De Marco (Italy)

4 June Group B	France	4–0	China	Nice, France
18:30 CEST	Joseph-Monrose 21', 39'; Benezet 64'; Jarsalé 70'	Report		Stadium: Stade du Ray; Referee: Imer Machado (Colombia)

6 June Group B	China	1–2	Mexico	La Seyne, France
18:00 CEST	Pei Shuai 10'	Report	Izazola 40' (pen.); Reyes 65'	Stadium: Stade Marquet; Referee: Imer Machado (Colombia)

==== 2011 Weifang Cup ====
31 July Group stage	China	3–1	(Spain) Villarreal CF Youth	Weifang, China PR
16:00 (UTC+8)	Pei Shuai 27'; Wang Shangyuan 32', 38'		Chu Jinzhao 72' (o.g.)	Stadium: Weifang Olympic Park

1 August Group stage	China	2–3	(Mexico) C.D. Guadalajara Youth	Weifang, China PR
16:00 (UTC+8)	Zhuang Jiajie 39'; Ruan yang		22'; 57'; 88'

3 August Group stage	China	2–1	(South Korea) R.O.Korea Union	Weifang, China PR
9:00 (UTC+8)	Wang Shangyuan 20'; Pei Shuai 67'		Woo Eui-Seong 14'

4 August Semifinals	China	2–1	(Portugal) S.L. Benfica Youth	Weifang, China PR
16:00 (UTC+8)	Zhuang Jiajie 34' (pen.); Jin Bo 40'		Lopes 72'	Referee: Wang Litao

6 August final	China	1–3	(Mexico) C.D. Guadalajara Youth	Weifang, China PR
16:00 (UTC+8)	Shi Ke 9'		26'; Ortiz 66' (pen.); Zavala 78'	Stadium: Weifang Olympic Park

==== 2012 AFC U-19 Championship qualification ====
Group F

Team	Pld	W	D	L	GF	GA	GD	Pts
Australia	0	0	0	0	0	0	0	0
China	0	0	0	0	0	0	0	0
Indonesia	0	0	0	0	0	0	0	0
Singapore	0	0	0	0	0	0	0	0
Macau	0	0	0	0	0	0	0	0

31 October	China	v	Indonesia

4 November	China	v	Singapore

6 November	China	v	Macau

8 November	China	v	Australia

==== Friendly matches ====
May	North Korea	2–1	China	Pyongyang, DPR Korea
UTC+9

17 May	China	1–3	North Korea	Weifang, China PR
16:00 UTC+8	Wu Xinghan 90' (pen.)		42'; 55'; 77'

=== Men's U-17 team ===
==== AEGON Future Cup ====
23 April Group B	China	2–3	(United States) D.C. United U17	Amsterdam, Netherlands
13:00

23 April Group B	China	0–4	(Germany) FC Bayern Munich U17	Amsterdam, Netherlands
16:00

24 April Group B	China	0–2	(Belgium) RSC Anderlecht U17	Amsterdam, Netherlands
10:00

25 April 7th Place playoff	China	1–2	(Scotland) Celtic F.C. U17	Amsterdam, Netherlands
10:00

==== 2012 AFC U-16 Championship qualification ====
Group E

Team	Pld	W	D	L	GF	GA	GD	Pts
North Korea	0	0	0	0	0	0	0	0
China	0	0	0	0	0	0	0	0
Timor-Leste	0	0	0	0	0	0	0	0
Singapore	0	0	0	0	0	0	0	0
Malaysia	0	0	0	0	0	0	0	0
Macau	0	0	0	0	0	0	0	0

8 September	China	v	Malaysia	Pyongyang, North Korea
15:30 (UTC+9)				Stadium: Yanggakdo Stadium

10 September	China	v	Singapore	Pyongyang, North Korea
13:00(UTC+9)				Stadium: Kim Il-sung Stadium

13 September	China	v	Macau	Pyongyang, North Korea
15:30(UTC+9)				Stadium: Yanggakdo Stadium

15 September	China	v	Timor-Leste	Pyongyang, North Korea
13:00(UTC+9)				Stadium: Kim Il-sung Stadium

18 September	North Korea	v	China	Pyongyang, North Korea
17:00(UTC+9)				Stadium: Kim Il-sung Stadium

=== Women's U-20 team ===
==== International tournament in Russia ====
6 March Group	China	5–0	Belarus	Sochi, Russia

8 March Group	China	3–1	Ukraine	Sochi, Russia

10 March Group	China	4–0	Turkey	Sochi, Russia

12 March Quarter finals	China	4–0	Russia	Sochi, Russia

14 March Semi finals	China	0–1	Japan	Sochi, Russia

==== 2011 AFC U-19 Women's Championship ====
Team	Pld	W	D	L	GF	GA	GD	Pts
Australia	0	0	0	0	0	0	0	0
China	0	0	0	0	0	0	0	0
North Korea	0	0	0	0	0	0	0	0
Japan	0	0	0	0	0	0	0	0
South Korea	0	0	0	0	0	0	0	0
Vietnam	0	0	0	0	0	0	0	0

6 October	China	v	Japan	Ho Chi Minh City, Vietnam
16:00 UTC+7				Stadium: Thanh Long Sports Centre

8 October	Vietnam	v	China	Ho Chi Minh City, Vietnam
19:00 UTC+7				Stadium: Thong Nhat Stadium

10 October	China	v	South Korea	Ho Chi Minh City, Vietnam
16:00 UTC+7				Stadium: Thanh Long Sports Centre

13 October	China	v	Australia	Ho Chi Minh City, Vietnam
16:00 UTC+7				Stadium: Thong Nhat Stadium

16 October	China	v	North Korea	Ho Chi Minh City, Vietnam
16:00 UTC+7				Stadium: Thong Nhat Stadium

=== Women's U-17 team ===
==== 2011 AFC U-16 Women's Championship ====
Team	Pld	W	D	L	GF	GA	GD	Pts
Australia	0	0	0	0	0	0	0	0
China	0	0	0	0	0	0	0	0
North Korea	0	0	0	0	0	0	0	0
Japan	0	0	0	0	0	0	0	0
South Korea	0	0	0	0	0	0	0	0
Thailand	0	0	0	0	0	0	0	0
