= 2017 Tianjin Quanjian F.C. season =

Tianjin Quanjian
- Chairman: Shu Yuhui (束昱辉)
- Manager: Fabio Cannavaro
- Stadium: Haihe Educational Football Stadium
- Super League: 3rd
- FA Cup: Quarter-finals

Tianjin Quanjian F.C. is a professional Chinese football club that currently participates in the Chinese Super League division under licence from the Chinese Football Association (CFA). The team is based in Tianjin and their home stadium is the Haihe Educational Football Stadium that has a seating capacity of 30,000. Their current owners are Quanjian Nature Medicine who officially took over the club on 7 July 2015.

== Transfers ==
=== In ===
==== Winter ====
Squad number	Position	Player	Age	Moving from	Type	Transfer fee	Date	Source
28	MF	(Belgium) Axel Witsel	28	(Russia) Zenit Saint Petersburg	Transfer	Undisclosed	3 January 2017	

=== Out ===
==== Winter ====
Squad number	Position	Player	Age	Moving to	Type	Transfer fee	Date	Source

== Pre-season and friendlies ==
=== Training matches ===
Date	Opponents	H / A	Result	Scorers

== Competitions ==
Win Draw Loss

=== Chinese Super League ===
==== Table ====
Pos	Team	Pld	W	D	L	GF	GA	GD	Pts	Qualification or relegation
1	Guangzhou Evergrande Taobao (C)	30	20	4	6	69	42	+27	64	Qualification to Champions League group stage
2	Shanghai SIPG	30	17	7	6	72	39	+33	58	Qualification to Champions League play-off round
3	Tianjin Quanjian	30	15	9	6	46	33	+13	54	Qualification to Champions League play-off round
4	Hebei China Fortune	30	15	7	8	55	38	+17	52	
5	Guangzhou R&F	30	15	7	8	59	46	+13	52	

Source: League table
Rules for classification: 1) Points; 2) Head-to-head points; 3) Head-to-head goal difference; 4) Head-to-head goals scored; 5) Reserve league points; 6) Goal difference; 7) Goals scored; 8) Disciplinary points (1 point for each yellow card, 3 points for each red card); 9) Draw
(C) Champions

==== Results by round ====
Round	1	2	3	4	5	6	7	8	9	10	11	12	13	14	15	16	17	18	19	20	21	22	23	24	25	26	27	28	29	30
Ground	A	A	H	H	H	A	H	H	A	A	H	A	A	A	H	H	H	A	A	A	H	A	A	H	H	A	H	H	H	A
Result	L	D	W	W	D	D	D	L	L	W	W	W	L	W	W	W	W	D	W	D	D	L	D	W	W	L	D	W	W	W
Position	14	12	10	7	7	8	9	9	10	7	6	6	6	6	5	5	3	4	4	4	3	4	5	5	4	4	4	4	4	3

Updated to match(es) played on 4 November 2017. Source: Chinese Super League Table (in Chinese)
A = Away; H = Home; W = Win; D = Draw; L = Loss

==== Results summary ====
Overall								Home						Away					
Pld	W	D	L	GF	GA	GD	Pts	W	D	L	GF	GA	GD	W	D	L	GF	GA	GD
30	15	9	6	46	33	+13	54	10	4	1	31	16	+15	5	5	5	15	17	−2

Last updated: 4 November 2017.
Source: Competitive Matches

=== Chinese FA Cup ===
3 May 2017 3	Dalian Yifang	0 - 2	Tianjin Quanjian	Dalian
15:30 (UTC+8)			Moraes 52', 77'	Stadium: Dalian Sports Center Stadium; Attendance: 2,621; Referee: Ma Li

21 June 2017 4	Heilongjiang Lava Spring	1 - 2	Tianjin Quanjian	Harbin
15:30 (UTC+8)	Pan Yuchen 90+1'		Su Yuanjie 40'; Wang Yongpo 76'	Stadium: Harbin International Convention Exhibition and Sports Center; Attendance: 12,456; Referee: Dong Kun

19 July 2017 Quarter-finals 1st Leg	Tianjin Quanjian	3 - 0	Shanghai SIPG	Tianjin
18:00 (UTC+8)	Wang Xiaolong 31'; Pato 73', 87'			Stadium: Haihe Educational Football Stadium; Attendance: 25,100; Referee: Ai Kun

3 August 2017 Quarter-finals 2nd Leg	Shanghai SIPG	4 - 0	Tianjin Quanjian	Shanghai
19:35 (UTC+8)	Hulk 6', 45+1' (pen.); Oscar 53'; Zheng Zhiyun 70'			Stadium: Shanghai Stadium; Attendance: 25,503; Referee: Fu Ming
