= Yang Zhaohui (footballer, born 1998) =

Chinese association football player

Personal information
- Date of birth: 29 May 1998 (age 28)
- Place of birth: Tianjin, China
- Height: 1.88 m (6 ft 2 in)
- Position: Defender

Youth career
- Guangzhou Evergrande
- 2016–2017: → Vizela (youth loan)
- 2017: → Tianjin Tianhai (youth loan)

Senior career*
Years	Team	Apps	(Gls)
2018–2022	Guangzhou FC	0	(0)
2018	→ Busan FC (loan)	12	(0)
2020	→ Beijing Chengfeng (loan)	6	(0)
2021	→ Suzhou Dongwu (loan)	20	(0)
2022	Chongqing Liangjiang Athletic	0	(0)
2022–2023	Nanjing City	25	(0)
2023	Shanghai Jiading Huilong	7	(0)
2024	Nanjing City	0	(0)
2024	Tai'an Tiankuang	22	(0)
2025	Shijiazhuang Gongfu	0	(0)
- * Club domestic league appearances and goals as of 17:14, 16 February 2023 (UTC)

Yang Zhaohui (Chinese: 杨朝辉; born 29 May 1998) is a Chinese footballer currently playing as a defender.

== Club career ==
In 2016, while playing for Guangzhou Evergrande, he was invited to trial with Dutch side SC Heerenveen alongside compatriot Qian Yumiao. However, neither player was signed by Heerenveen, and they both moved to Portugal to sign for Vizela, with Yang joining on loan. On his return to Guangzhou, he was loaned out again, this time to fellow Chinese club Tianjin Tianhai. He was loaned to K3 League side Busan in 2018, where he made twelve league appearances.

In 2019 he was linked with a loan move to Hong Kong Premier League side Kitchee, but despite spending time training with the Hong Kong club, this move failed to materialise. The following year, he was loaned to China League One side Beijing Chengfeng. He was loaned to Suzhou Dongwu in 2021, and was suspended for three games after kicking an opposition player during a China League One fixture.

He left Guangzhou permanently in April 2022, joining fellow Chinese Super League side Chongqing Liangjiang Athletic. However, this stay did not last long, and in June of the same year, he joined Nanjing City, following the dissolution of Chongqing Liangjiang Athletic.

== Career statistics ==
=== Club ===
As of 16 February 2023.

Appearances and goals by club, season and competition
Club	Season	League			Cup		Other		Total	
Club	Season	Division	Apps	Goals	Apps	Goals	Apps	Goals	Apps	Goals
Guangzhou FC	2018	Chinese Super League	0	0	0	0	0	0	0	0
Guangzhou FC	2019	Chinese Super League	0	0	0	0	0	0	0	0
Guangzhou FC	2020	Chinese Super League	0	0	0	0	0	0	0	0
Guangzhou FC	2021	Chinese Super League	0	0	0	0	0	0	0	0
Guangzhou FC	2022	Chinese Super League	0	0	0	0	0	0	0	0
Guangzhou FC	Total		0	0	0	0	0	0	0	0
Busan (loan)	2018	K3 League Basic	12	0	0	0	0	0	12	0
Beijing Chengfeng (loan)	2020	China League One	6	0	0	0	0	0	0	0
Suzhou Dongwu (loan)	2021	China League One	20	0	1 (Note: Appearances in the Chinese FA Cup)	0	0	0	21	0
Chongqing Liangjiang Athletic	2022	Chinese Super League	0	0	0	0	0	0	0	0
Nanjing City	2022	China League One	22	0	1	0	0	0	23	0
Career total			2	0	2	0	0	0	4	0
