= Chu Jinzhao =

Chinese footballer

Personal information
- Full name: Chu Jinzhao
- Date of birth: 11 January 1993 (age 33)
- Place of birth: Tianjin, China
- Height: 1.82 m (5 ft 11 1/2 in)
- Position: Defender

Youth career
- Tianjin Teda
- 2011–2012: → Varzim (loan)
- 2012–2013: → Oeiras (loan)

Senior career*
Years	Team	Apps	(Gls)
2014	Tianjin Teda	0	(0)
2014	→ Yinchuan Helanshan (loan)	7	(0)
2015–2019	Tianjin Quanjian	19	(0)
2020	Chengdu Better City	9	(0)
2021–2022	Nanjing City	40	(1)
2023	Guangxi Pingguo Haliao	1	(0)
Total		76	(1)
- * Club domestic league appearances and goals as of 31 December 2022

Chu Jinzhao (simplified Chinese: 储今朝; traditional Chinese: 儲今朝; pinyin: Chǔ Jīnzhāo; born 11 January 1993) is a Chinese former professional footballer.

On 10 September 2024, Chinese Football Association announced that Chu was banned from football-related activities for lifetime for involving in match-fixing.

== Club career ==
Chu Jinzhao was promoted to Chinese Super League side Tianjin Teda in 2014 after two years training with Portuguese side Varzim and Oeiras. He was loaned to China League Two side Yinchuan Helanshan for half season in the summer of 2014. In February 2015, Chu transferred to China League One side Tianjin Songjiang along with Su Yuanjie. He made his debut for the club on 11 April 2015 in a 1–1 home draw against Qingdao Jonoon. He made six league appearances in the 2016 season after Quanjian Nature Medicine took over the club and won the title of the league. Chu made his Super League debut on 15 April 2017 in a 1–1 home draw against Shanghai SIPG, coming on for Zheng Dalun in the 80th minute.

== Career statistics ==
As of 31 December 2023.

Appearances and goals by club, season and competition
Club	Season	League			National Cup		Continental		Other		Total	
Club	Season	Division	Apps	Goals	Apps	Goals	Apps	Goals	Apps	Goals	Apps	Goals
Tianjin Teda	2014	Chinese Super League	0	0	0	0	-		-		0	0
Yinchuan Helanshan (loan)	2014	China League Two	7	0	0	0	-		-		7	0
Tianjin Quanjian/ Tianjin Tianhai	2015	China League One	5	0	1	0	-		-		6	0
Tianjin Quanjian/ Tianjin Tianhai	2016	China League One	6	0	3	0	-		-		9	0
Tianjin Quanjian/ Tianjin Tianhai	2017	Chinese Super League	3	0	2	0	-		-		5	0
Tianjin Quanjian/ Tianjin Tianhai	2018	Chinese Super League	4	0	2	0	1	0	-		7	0
Tianjin Quanjian/ Tianjin Tianhai	2019	Chinese Super League	1	0	1	0	-		-		2	0
Tianjin Quanjian/ Tianjin Tianhai	Total		19	0	9	0	1	0	0	0	29	0
Chengdu Better City	2020	China League One	9	0	1	0	-		-		10	0
Nanjing City	2021	China League One	21	1	0	0	-		-		21	1
Nanjing City	2022	China League One	19	0	0	0	-		-		19	0
Nanjing City	Total		40	1	0	0	0	0	0	0	40	1
Guangxi Pingguo Haliao	2023	China League One	1	0	0	0	-		-		1	0
Career total			76	1	10	0	1	0	0	0	87	1

== Honours ==
=== Club ===
Tianjin Quanjian F.C.

- China League One: 2016
