= Qian Yumiao =

Chinese footballer (born 1998)

Qian Yumiao 钱宇淼
Personal information
- Date of birth: 7 February 1998 (age 28)
- Place of birth: Jingmen, Hubei, China
- Height: 1.81 m (5 ft 11 1/2 in)
- Positions: Right-back; midfielder

Team information
- Current team: Foshan Nanshi
- Number: 2

Youth career
- Hubei Youth
- 2013–2016: Wuhan Zall
- 2016–2017: Vizela

Senior career*
Years	Team	Apps	(Gls)
2017–2019	Tianjin Quanjian	6	(0)
2020–2025	Tianjin Jinmen Tiger	54	(1)
2026–	Foshan Nanshi	0	(0)
- * Club domestic league appearances and goals as of 26 August 2025

Qian Yumiao (simplified Chinese: 钱宇淼; traditional Chinese: 錢宇淼; pinyin: Qián Yǔmiǎo; born 7 February 1998) is a Chinese footballer who currently plays for China League One side Foshan Nanshi.

== Club career ==
Qian Yumiao joined Wuhan Zall's youth academy in 2013. In August 2016, he had a brief trial with Eredivisie side SC Heerenveen along with Yang Zhaohui. Failing to pass the trial, they moved to Portugal and joined Vizela's U19s in September 2016. Qian transferred to Chinese Super League side Tianjin Quanjian in July 2017. On 29 October 2017, he made his senior debut in a 4–1 home win against Liaoning FC, coming on for Zhang Cheng in the 73rd minute when Tianjin was leading 4–1.

On 16 July 2020, Qian transferred to fellow Chinese Super League side Tianjin TEDA (later renamed as Tianjin Jinmen Tiger). On 27 July 2020, he made his debut in a league game against Shanghai SIPG in a 3-1 defeat. He would go on to establish himself as a regular within the team and go on to score his first goal for the club in a league game on 14 December 2022 against Wuhan Yangtze River F.C. in a 3-0 victory.

== Career statistics ==
As of match played 21 June 2025.

Appearances and goals by club, season and competition
Club	Season	League			National Cup		Continental		Other		Total	
Club	Season	Division	Apps	Goals	Apps	Goals	Apps	Goals	Apps	Goals	Apps	Goals
Tianjin Quanjian	2017	Chinese Super League	1	0	0	0	-		-		1	0
Tianjin Quanjian	2018	Chinese Super League	0	0	0	0	0	0	-		0	0
Tianjin Quanjian	2019	Chinese Super League	5	0	2	0	-		-		7	0
Tianjin Quanjian	Total		6	0	2	0	0	0	0	0	8	0
Tianjin TEDA/ Tianjin Jinmen Tiger	2020	Chinese Super League	11	0	4	0	-		-		15	0
Tianjin TEDA/ Tianjin Jinmen Tiger	2021	Chinese Super League	17	0	2	0	-		-		19	0
Tianjin TEDA/ Tianjin Jinmen Tiger	2022	Chinese Super League	3	1	1	0	-		-		4	1
Tianjin TEDA/ Tianjin Jinmen Tiger	2023	Chinese Super League	12	0	3	0	-		-		15	0
Tianjin TEDA/ Tianjin Jinmen Tiger	2024	Chinese Super League	10	0	3	0	-		-		13	0
Tianjin TEDA/ Tianjin Jinmen Tiger	2025	Chinese Super League	1	0	2	0	-		-		3	0
Tianjin TEDA/ Tianjin Jinmen Tiger	Total		54	1	15	0	0	0	0	0	69	1
Career total			60	1	17	0	0	0	0	0	77	1
