= Yan Zihao =

Chinese association football player

Personal information
- Date of birth: 18 January 1995 (age 31)
- Place of birth: Wuhan, Hubei, China
- Height: 1.78 m (5 ft 10 in)
- Positions: Left-back; left winger

Youth career
- Oliveirense
- –2012: Sacavenense
- 2013–2015: Sporting CP

Senior career*
Years	Team	Apps	(Gls)
2015	Cova da Piedade	9	(3)
2015–2016	Oriental Dragon	0	(0)
2015–2016	→ Torreense (loan)	7	(0)
2016–2019	Tianjin Quanjian	13	(0)
2018	→ Jiangsu Yancheng (loan)	4	(0)
2020–2021	Qingdao FC	10	(0)
2021–2024	Cangzhou Mighty Lions	40	(1)
2025	Guangdong GZ-Power	10	(1)

International career^{‡}
2014	China U-20	1	(0)
- * Club domestic league appearances and goals as of 27 April 2025 ‡ National team caps and goals as of 14:01, 6 December 2019 (UTC)

Yan Zihao (Chinese: 晏紫豪; pinyin: Yàn Zǐháo; born 18 January 1995) is a Chinese footballer who played most recently as a left-back or left winger.

== Club career ==
Yan Zihao was selected to go to football training camps held in Portugal to help in his youth development, in a scheme that was sponsored by the Chinese Football Association. His time in Portugal would see him join the senior teams of lower league sides Cova da Piedade and Torreense. On 1 February 2016, Yan would return to China with second-tier football club Tianjin Quanjian for the start of the 2016 China League One season. He would make his debut on 8 May 2016 in a league game against Qingdao Jonoon in a 3–2 victory where he came on as a substitute for Wang Jie. After the game he would start to become a regular within the team and help them win the division title and promotion to the top tier. The following season saw the club bring in experienced left-back Mi Haolun, which saw Yan lose his place within the team and he was loaned out to third-tier club Jiangsu Yancheng in the 2018 league season.

On 15 July 2020 Tianjin was dissolved due the owners financial irregularities. Yan would be free to join top-tier club Qingdao Huanghai on a free transfer on 8 April 2021. He would make his debut in a league game on 25 July 2021 against Wuhan Zall in a 2–0 defeat. After establishing himself as squad player he would leave the club to join another top-tier club in Cangzhou Mighty Lions on 8 April 2021. Yan would make his debut for the club in a league game on 27 April 2021 against Henan Songshan Longmen F.C. in a 0–0 draw.

== Career statistics ==
As of 27 April 2025.

Club	Season	League			Cup		Continental		Other		Total	
Club	Season	Division	Apps	Goals	Apps	Goals	Apps	Goals	Apps	Goals	Apps	Goals
Cova da Piedade	2014–15	Campeonato Nacional de Seniores	9	3	0	0	–		–		9	3
Torreense (loan)	2015–16	Campeonato de Portugal	7	0	0	0	–		–		7	0
Tianjin Quanjian	2016	China League One	12	0	0	0	–		–		12	0
Tianjin Quanjian	2017	Chinese Super League	0	0	0	0	–		–		0	0
Tianjin Quanjian	2019	Chinese Super League	1	0	2	0	–		–		3	0
Tianjin Quanjian	Total		13	0	2	0	0	0	0	0	15	0
Jiangsu Yancheng (loan)	2018	China League Two	9	0	0	0	–		–		9	0
Qingdao Huanghai	2020	Chinese Super League	10	0	1	0	–		–		11	0
Cangzhou Mighty Lions	2021	Chinese Super League	15	1	0	0	–		–		15	1
Cangzhou Mighty Lions	2022	Chinese Super League	1	0	2	0	–		–		3	0
Cangzhou Mighty Lions	2023	Chinese Super League	15	0	1	0	–		–		16	0
Cangzhou Mighty Lions	2024	Chinese Super League	9	0	1	0	–		–		10	0
Cangzhou Mighty Lions	Total		40	1	4	0	0	0	0	0	44	1
Guangdong GZ-Power	2025	China League One	1	0	1	0	–		–		2	0
Career total			89	4	8	0	0	0	0	0	97	4

== Honours ==
=== Club ===
Tianjin Quanjian F.C.

- China League One: 2016
