= Wen Jiabao (footballer) =

Chinese footballer

Wen Jiabao 温家宝
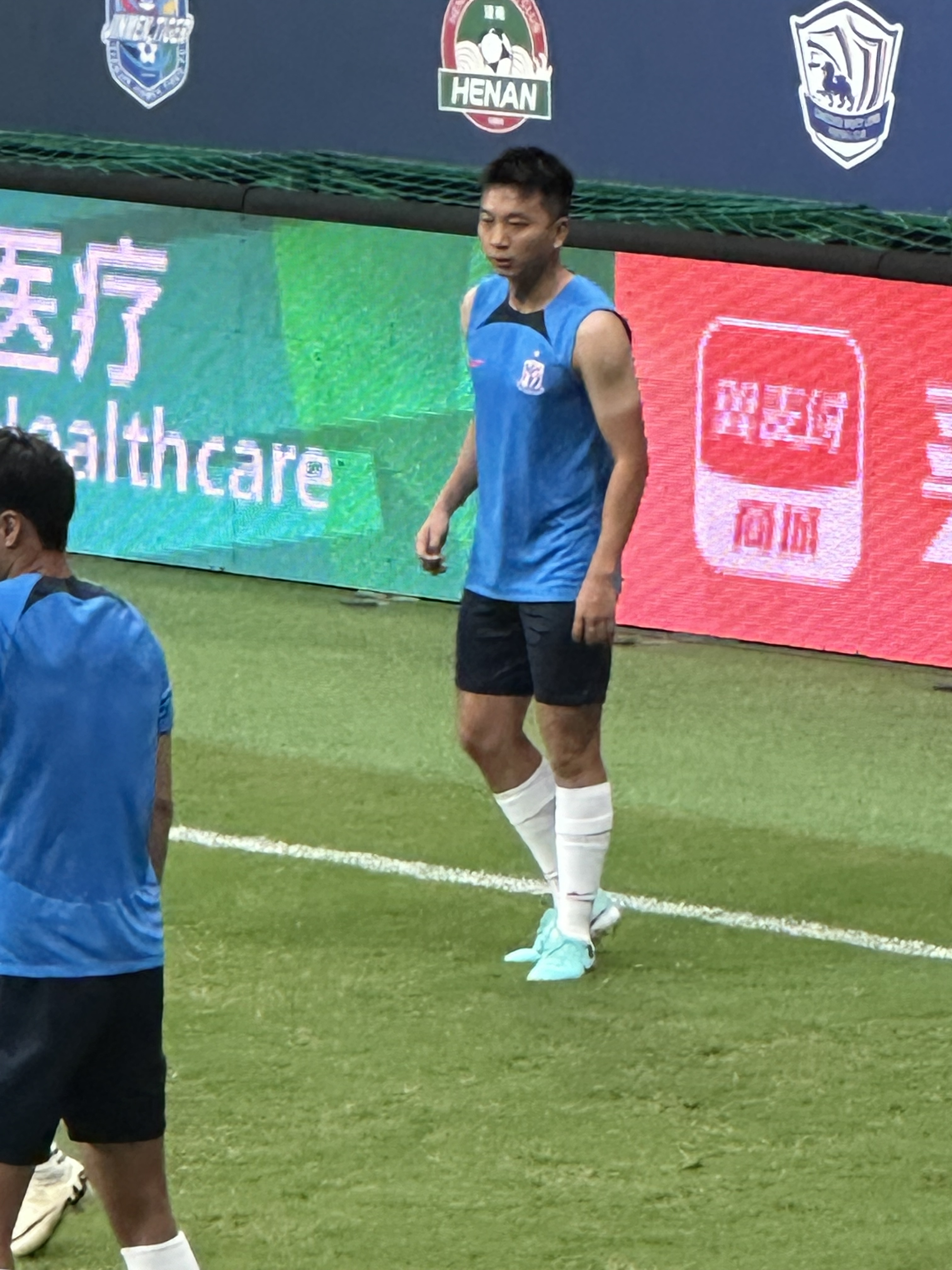
- Wen Jiabao in August 2024

Personal information
- Full name: Wen Jiabao
- Date of birth: 2 January 1999 (age 27)
- Place of birth: Liaoyang, Liaoning, China
- Height: 1.77 m (5 ft 9 1/2 in)
- Positions: Left-back; left winger

Team information
- Current team: Dalian Yingbo
- Number: 15

Youth career
- 2009–2015: Dalian Aerbin
- 2016: Guangzhou Evergrande Taobao

Senior career*
Years	Team	Apps	(Gls)
2017–2019	Guangzhou Evergrande	8	(0)
2019	→ Tianjin Tianhai (loan)	10	(0)
2020–2024	Shanghai Shenhua	56	(0)
2025–	Dalian Yingbo	26	(0)

International career^{‡}
2015	China U17	3	(0)
2018	China U20	11	(0)
2018–2023	China U23	6	(0)
2022–	China	3	(0)
Medal record
Representing China
Men's football
EAFF Championship
Bronze medal – third place	2022 Japan	Team
- * Club domestic league appearances and goals as of 19 November 2026 ‡ National team caps and goals as of 27 July 2022

Wen Jiabao (Chinese: 温家宝; pinyin: Wēn Jiābǎo; Mandarin pronunciation: [wə́n tɕjá pàʊ]; born 2 January 1999) is a Chinese professional footballer who plays for Chinese football club Dalian Yingbo.

== Club career ==
Wen Jiabao joined Chinese Super League club Guangzhou Evergrande from Dalian Aerbin on 29 January 2016 on a free transfer. On 30 August 2016, Dalian Aerbin (now known as Dalian Yifang) would claim that they still had a valid contract with Wen Jiabao and that Guangzhou Evergrande acted fraudulently. The contract dispute would be settled and Wen was promoted to Guangzhou Evergrande's first team squad in time for the start of the 2017 Chinese Super League season. He made his senior debut on 8 August 2017 in a 2–2 home draw against city rivals Guangzhou R&F as the benefactor of the new rule of the league that at least one Under-23 player must be in the starting line-up. He was substituted off by Zheng Long in the 20th minute. After playing several further games Wen was demoted to the reserve squad in the 2018 season.

On 7 February 2019, Wen was loaned to fellow first-tier club Tianjin Tianhai for the 2019 season. He would go on to make his debut for the club on 31 March 2019 against Shandong Luneng Taishan F.C. in a league game that ended in a 4–2 defeat. The following season Wen would join another top-tier club in Shanghai Shenhua on 6 January 2020 on a permanent basis. He would make his debut against his old club Guangzhou Evergrande on 25 July 2020 in a league game that ended in a 2–0 defeat.

On 31 December 2024, Shanghai Shenhua announced that Wen is released as free agent.

On 11 January 2025, Wen joined Chinese football club Dalian Yingbo.

== International career ==
On 20 July 2022, Wen made his international debut in a 3–0 defeat against South Korea in the 2022 EAFF E-1 Football Championship, as the Chinese FA decided to field the U-23 national team for this senior competition.

== Career statistics ==
As of 1 January 2026.

Appearances and goals by club, season and competition
Club	Season	League			National Cup		Continental		Other		Total	
Club	Season	Division	Apps	Goals	Apps	Goals	Apps	Goals	Apps	Goals	Apps	Goals
Guangzhou Evergrande	2017	Chinese Super League	8	0	1	0	0	0	0 (Note: Appearances in Chinese FA Super Cup)	0	9	0
Guangzhou Evergrande	2018	Chinese Super League	0	0	0	0	0	0	0	0	0	0
Guangzhou Evergrande	Total		8	0	1	0	0	0	0	0	9	0
Tianjin Tianhai (loan)	2019	Chinese Super League	10	0	2	0	-		-		12	0
Shanghai Shenhua	2020	Chinese Super League	20	0	1	0	4	0	-		25	0
Shanghai Shenhua	2021	Chinese Super League	16	0	5	0	-		-		21	0
Shanghai Shenhua	2022	Chinese Super League	15	0	1	0	-		-		16	0
Shanghai Shenhua	2023	Chinese Super League	5	0	0	0	-		-		5	0
Shanghai Shenhua	2024	Chinese Super League	0	0	0	0	0	0	0	0	0	0
Shanghai Shenhua	Total		56	0	7	0	4	0	0	0	67	0
Dalian Yingbo	2025	Chinese Super League	23	0	1	0	-		-		24	0
Career total			97	0	11	0	4	0	0	0	112	0

== Honours ==
Guangzhou Evergrande

- Chinese Super League: 2017

Shanghai Shenhua

- Chinese FA Cup: 2023

Dalian Yingbo

- Chinese Super League: 2026
