= Yao Junsheng =

Chinese footballer

Yao Junsheng 姚均晟
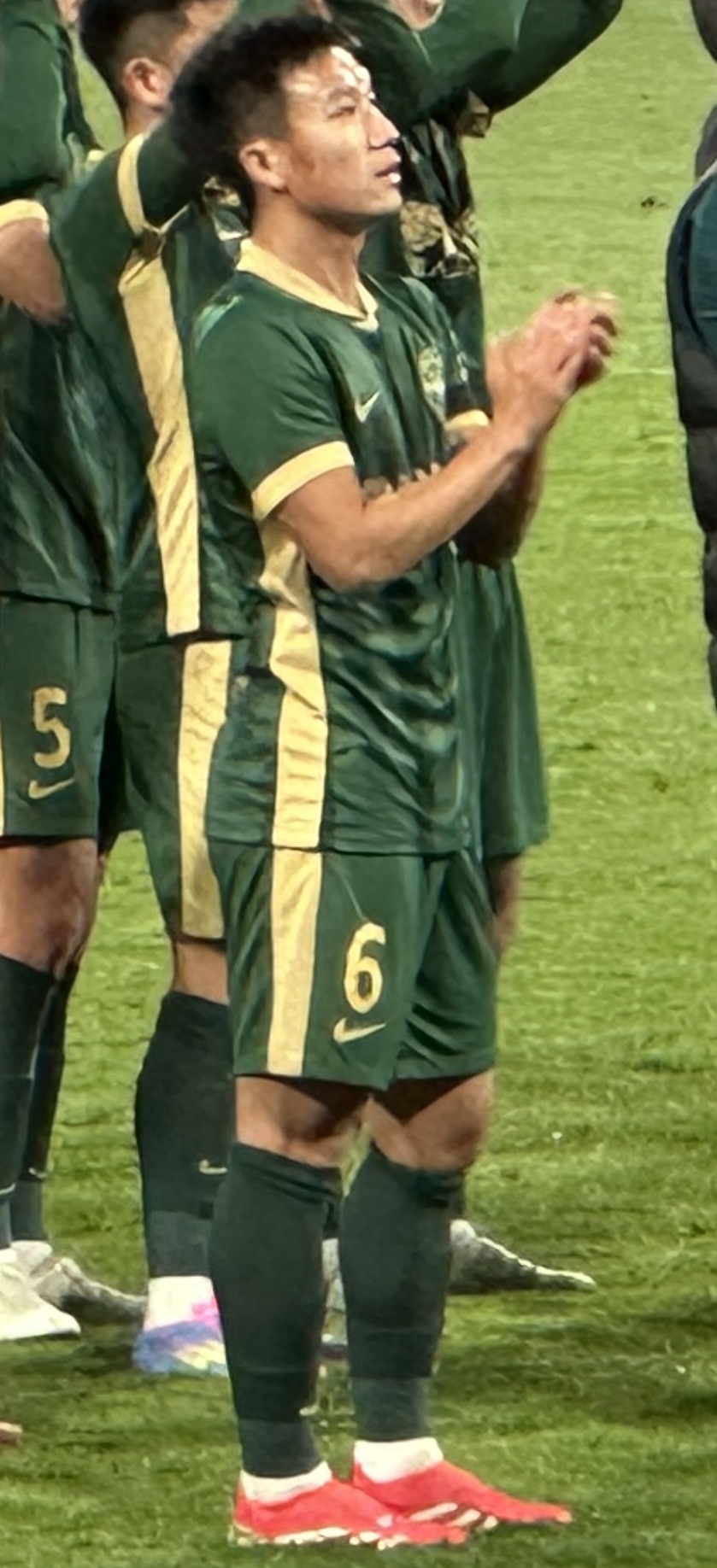
- Yao Junsheng in April 2025

Personal information
- Full name: Yao Junsheng
- Date of birth: 29 October 1995 (age 31)
- Place of birth: Wenzhou, Zhejiang, China
- Height: 1.72 m (5 ft 7 1/2 in)
- Position: Midfielder

Team information
- Current team: Shenzhen Peng City
- Number: 6

Youth career
- 2006–2016: Shandong Luneng

Senior career*
Years	Team	Apps	(Gls)
2014	→ Sintrense (loan)	0	(0)
2015	→ Real Massamá (loan)	5	(0)
2016	→ Pinhalnovense (loan)	4	(0)
2016–2020	Shandong Luneng	16	(0)
2017	→ Meizhou Hakka (loan)	26	(5)
2019	→ Tianjin Tianhai (loan)	20	(2)
2020	→ Zhejiang Energy Greentown (loan)	5	(1)
2021–2025	Zhejiang FC	104	(9)
2026–	Shenzhen Peng City	25	(1)

International career^{‡}
2014	China U-19	5	(0)
2016–2018	China U-23	28	(12)
2019–	China	1	(0)
- * Club domestic league appearances and goals as of 22 November 2026 ‡ National team caps and goals as of 22:04, 10 September 2019 (UTC)

Yao Junsheng (Chinese: 姚均晟; pinyin: Yáo Jūnshèng; born 29 October 1995) is a Chinese professional footballer who currently plays as a left-footed midfielder for Shenzhen Peng City.

== Club career ==
Yao Junsheng joined Shandong Luneng Taishan's youth academy in 2006. He went to Portugal for further training in January 2014, and played for Sintrense, Real Massamá and Pinhalnovense between 2014 and 2016.

Yao was promoted to Shandong Luneng's first team squad by Felix Magath in July 2016. He was loaned to China League One side Meizhou Hakka for one season in February 2017. He made his debut for Meizhou on 11 March 2017 in a 2–0 home loss against Dalian Yifang. On 2 July 2017, Yao scored his first senior goal by penalty in a 1–1 away draw against Dalian Yifang. He scored five goals in 26 appearances in the 2017 season, which ensured Meizhou Hakka's stay in the second tier for another season.

Yao returned to Shandong Luneng in the 2018 season. On 4 March 2018, he made his Chinese Super League debut in a 3–0 home win over Beijing Sinobo Guoan. On 13 February 2019, Yao was loaned to fellow first-tier club Tianjin Tianhai for the 2019 season.

The following season he was loaned out again, this time to second-tier club Zhejiang Energy Greentown where he made his debut in a league game on 24 October 2020 against Kunshan in a 2–0 victory. The club would miss out on promotion through the play-offs, however On 17 March 2021, Yao joined the China League One club on a permanent basis as they renamed themselves Zhejiang Professional. He would go on to establish himself as a vital member of the team as they gained promotion to the top tier at the end of the 2021 China League One season through a play-off victory against Qingdao.

On 4 January 2026, Yao joined Chinese Super League club Shenzhen Peng City.

== International career ==
Yao made his debut for the Chinese national team on 10 September 2019 in a 5–0 win against the Maldives, coming on as a substitute for Hao Junmin in the 80th minute.

== Career statistics ==
=== Club statistics ===
As of 31 January 2023.

Appearances and goals by club, season and competition
Club	Season	League			National Cup		Continental		Other		Total	
Club	Season	Division	Apps	Goals	Apps	Goals	Apps	Goals	Apps	Goals	Apps	Goals
Sintrense (loan)	2014–15	Campeonato de Portugal	0	0	0	0	-		-		0	0
Real Massamá (loan)	2014–15	Lisbon FA Pró-National Division	5	0	2 (Note: Appearances in Taça da A.F.Lisboa)	0	-		-		7	0
Real Massamá (loan)	2015–16	Campeonato de Portugal	0	0	0	0	-		-		0	0
Real Massamá (loan)	Total		5	0	2	0	0	0	0	0	7	0
Pinhalnovense (loan)	2015–16	Campeonato de Portugal	4	0	0	0	-		-		4	0
Shandong Luneng Taishan	2016	Chinese Super League	0	0	0	0	-		-		0	0
Shandong Luneng Taishan	2018	Chinese Super League	15	0	4	0	-		-		19	0
Shandong Luneng Taishan	2020	Chinese Super League	1	0	0	0	-		-		1	0
Shandong Luneng Taishan	Total		16	0	4	0	0	0	0	0	20	0
Meizhou Hakka (loan)	2017	China League One	26	5	0	0	-		-		26	5
Tianjin Tianhai (loan)	2019	Chinese Super League	20	2	2	1	-		-		22	3
Zhejiang Energy Greentown (loan)	2020	China League One	5	1	0	0	-		2 (Note: Appearances in Promotion/Relegation Play-offs)	0	7	1
Zhejiang FC	2021	China League One	28	4	0	0	-		0	0	28	4
Zhejiang FC	2022	Chinese Super League	21	1	6	2	-		-		27	3
Zhejiang FC	Total		49	5	6	2	0	0	0	0	55	7
Career total			125	13	14	3	0	0	2	0	141	16

=== International statistics ===
National team
Year	Apps	Goals
2019	1	0
Total	1	0
