= Zheng Dalun =

Chinese footballer

Zheng Dalun 郑达伦
Personal information
- Date of birth: 11 February 1994 (age 32)
- Place of birth: Anshan, Liaoning, China
- Height: 1.70 m (5 ft 7 in)
- Positions: Winger; full-back; forward

Team information
- Current team: Henan FC
- Number: 29

Youth career
- 2006–2012: Shanghai Dongya

Senior career*
Years	Team	Apps	(Gls)
2011–2012	Shanghai Zobon (loan)	?	(?)
2013–2015	Shanghai Dongya	7	(1)
2015	→ Tianjin Songjiang (loan)	10	(0)
2016–2019	Tianjin Quanjian	96	(9)
2020–2023	Shenzhen FC	46	(1)
2024	Cangzhou Mighty Lions	29	(0)
2025–	Henan FC	26	(0)

International career
2009–2010	China U-17		
2011–2012	China U-20		
- * Club domestic league appearances and goals as of 22 November 2026

Zheng Dalun (Chinese: 郑达伦; pinyin: Zhèng Dálún; born 11 February 1994) is a Chinese football player who currently plays for Chinese Super League side Henan FC.

== Club career ==
Zheng started his professional football career in 2011 when he was loaned to Shanghai Zobon's squad for the 2011 China League Two campaign. He returned to his parent club Shanghai Dongya who were recently promoted to the Chinese Super League in 2013. On 21 May 2013, he made his debut for Shanghai Dongya in the third round of 2013 Chinese FA Cup which Shanghai Dongya played against Chongqing Lifan. Zheng missed his penalty in the first round of the penalty shootout, however, Shanghai eventually beat Chongqing 6–5 and advanced to the next round. On 27 September 2013, he made his Super League debut in a 6–1 home victory against Qingdao Jonoon, coming on as a substitute for Luis Cabezas in the 80th minute. He scored his first goal for Shanghai East Asia 5 minutes later in the match.

On 9 July 2015, Zheng was loaned to China League One side Tianjin Songjiang until 31 December 2015. He made a permanent transfer to Tianjin Quanjian on 11 February 2016 after Quanjian Nature Medicine took over the club. He would be an integral member of the team that won the 2016 China League One division title. With significant investment from the owners Tianjin would go on to qualify for the 2018 AFC Champions League. Unfortunately the club was dissolved at the end of the 2019 Chinese Super League season due the owners financial irregularities. On 24 February 2020 he would join fellow top tier club Shenzhen. He would make his debut in a league game on 26 July 2020 against Guangzhou R&F in a 3-0 victory.

== Career statistics ==
Statistics accurate as of match played 31 December 2025.

Appearances and goals by club, season and competition
Club	Season	League			National Cup		Continental		Other		Total	
Club	Season	Division	Apps	Goals	Apps	Goals	Apps	Goals	Apps	Goals	Apps	Goals
Shanghai Zobon (loan)	2011	China League Two			-		-		-			
Shanghai Zobon (loan)	2012	China League Two			0	0	-		-			
Shanghai Zobon (loan)	Total				0	0	0	0	0	0		
Shanghai Dongya	2013	Chinese Super League	4	1	2	0	-		-		6	1
Shanghai Dongya	2014	Chinese Super League	3	0	1	0	-		-		4	0
Shanghai Dongya	2015	Chinese Super League	0	0	1	0	-		-		1	0
Shanghai Dongya	Total		7	1	4	0	0	0	0	0	11	1
Tianjin Quanjian (loan)	2015	China League One	10	0	0	0	-		-		10	0
Tianjin Quanjian	2016	China League One	22	0	5	2	-		-		27	2
Tianjin Quanjian	2017	Chinese Super League	27	6	4	0	-		-		31	6
Tianjin Quanjian	2018	Chinese Super League	20	1	0	0	8	0	-		28	1
Tianjin Quanjian	2019	Chinese Super League	27	2	0	0	-		-		27	2
Tianjin Quanjian	Total		96	9	9	2	8	0	0	0	113	11
Shenzhen FC	2020	Chinese Super League	13	0	1	0	-		-		14	0
Shenzhen FC	2021	Chinese Super League	16	1	1	0	-		-		17	1
Shenzhen FC	2022	Chinese Super League	17	0	0	0	-		-		17	0
Shenzhen FC	2023	Chinese Super League	21	0	0	0	-		-		21	0
Shenzhen FC	Total		67	1	2	0	0	0	0	0	69	1
Cangzhou Mighty Lions	2024	Chinese Super League	29	0	0	0	-		-		29	0
Henan FC	2025	Chinese Super League	12	0	2	0	-		-		14	0
Career total			221	11	17	2	8	0	0	0	246	13

== Honours ==
=== Club ===
Tianjin Quanjian F.C.

- China League One: 2016.
