= Su Yuanjie =

Chinese footballer

Su Yuanjie 苏缘杰
Personal information
- Full name: Su Yuanjie
- Date of birth: 14 April 1995 (age 31)
- Place of birth: Jinan, Shandong, China
- Height: 1.78 m (5 ft 10 in)
- Positions: Midfielder; full-back

Team information
- Current team: Shenzhen Juniors
- Number: 15

Youth career
- Tianjin TEDA
- 2013–2014: Paços de Ferreira

Senior career*
Years	Team	Apps	(Gls)
2015–2018	Tianjin Quanjian	54	(4)
2019–2025	Tianjin Jinmen Tiger	108	(2)
2026–	Shenzhen Juniors	0	(0)
- * Club domestic league appearances and goals as of 26 August 2025

Su Yuanjie (simplified Chinese: 苏缘杰; traditional Chinese: 蘇緣傑; pinyin: Sū Yuánjié; born 14 April 1995) is a Chinese footballer who currently plays for Shenzhen Juniors in the China League One.

== Club career ==
Su Yuanjie started his professional football career in 2015 when he joined China League One side Tianjin Tianhai. On 14 March 2015, he made his senior debut in a 2–0 away loss against Beijing Enterprises, coming on for Liu Qing in the 56th minute. On 12 July 2015, Su scored his first senior goal in a 3–1 home victory over Wuhan Zall. He scored his second goal of the season on 25 July 2015 in a 2–0 away win over Qingdao Jonoon. Su became a substitute player in the 2016 season after Quanjian Nature Medicine took over the club. He made three league appearances as Tianjin Tianhai won the title and promoted to the Chinese Super League. He made his Super League debut on 4 March 2017 in a 2–0 away loss to Guangzhou R&F, coming on for Zhao Xuri in the 80th minute. On 20 May 2018, Su scored his first goal in the Super League and assisted Alexandre Pato's winning goal in a 2–1 home win against Shanghai Greenland Shenhua.

Su transferred back to fellow Super League side Tianjin TEDA (later renamed as Tianjin Jinmen Tiger) on 27 February 2019. He would make his debut on 30 April 2019 in a Chinese FA Cup game against Zibo Cuju in a 4-1 victory. He would gradually start to establish himself as a regular within the team and go on to score his first goal for the club, which was in a Chinese FA Cup game on 13 October 2021 against Beijing Sport University in a 3-0 victory.

On 20 January 2026, Su joined to China League One club Shenzhen Juniors.

== Career statistics ==
As of match played on 4 June 2023.

Appearances and goals by club, season and competition
Club	Season	League			National Cup		Continental		Other		Total	
Club	Season	Division	Apps	Goals	Apps	Goals	Apps	Goals	Apps	Goals	Apps	Goals
Tianjin Quanjian	2015	China League One	25	2	1	0	-		-		26	2
Tianjin Quanjian	2016	China League One	3	0	4	0	-		-		7	0
Tianjin Quanjian	2017	Chinese Super League	9	0	2	1	-		-		11	1
Tianjin Quanjian	2018	Chinese Super League	17	2	1	2	7	0	-		25	4
Tianjin Quanjian	Total		54	4	8	3	7	0	0	0	69	7
Tianjin TEDA/ Tianjin Jinmen Tiger	2019	Chinese Super league	1	0	2	0	-		-		3	0
Tianjin TEDA/ Tianjin Jinmen Tiger	2020	Chinese Super league	10	0	3	0	-		-		13	0
Tianjin TEDA/ Tianjin Jinmen Tiger	2021	Chinese Super league	18	0	2	2	-		-		20	2
Tianjin TEDA/ Tianjin Jinmen Tiger	2022	Chinese Super league	26	2	1	0	-		-		27	2
Tianjin TEDA/ Tianjin Jinmen Tiger	2023	Chinese Super league	11	0	0	0	-		-		11	0
Tianjin TEDA/ Tianjin Jinmen Tiger	Total		66	2	8	2	0	0	0	0	74	4
Career total			120	6	16	5	7	0	0	0	143	11

== Honours ==
=== Club ===
Tianjin Quanjian

- China League One: 2016
