= Wen Junjie =

Chinese footballer

Wen Junjie 文俊杰
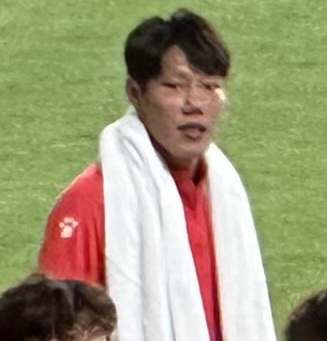
- Wen Junjie in May 2025

Personal information
- Date of birth: 16 April 1997 (age 29)
- Place of birth: Changsha, Hunan, China
- Height: 1.84 m (6 ft 1/2 in)
- Positions: Defender; midfielder

Team information
- Current team: Shaanxi Union (on loan from Foshan Nanshi)
- Number: 2

Youth career
- 2011–2013: Beijing Sangao
- 2014–2017: Hangzhou Greentown

Senior career*
| Years | Team | Apps | (Gls) |
| 2017 | Hangzhou Greentown | 3 | (0) |
| 2018–2019 | Tianjin Quanjian | 7 | (0) |
| 2019–2020 | Cangzhou Mighty Lions | 0 | (0) |
| 2021–2023 | Meizhou Hakka | 15 | (0) |
| 2024 | Foshan Nanshi | 27 | (0) |
| 2025 | Suzhou Dongwu | 12 | (0) |
| 2026– | Foshan Nanshi | 11 | (0) |
| 2026– | → Shaanxi Union (loan) | 0 | (0) |

International career
| 2015 | China U18 | 1 | (0) |
- * Club domestic league appearances and goals as of 3 March 2026

Wen Junjie (Chinese: 文俊杰; born 16 April 1997) is a Chinese professional footballer who currently plays as a defender or midfielder for China League One side Shaanxi Union, on loan from Foshan Nanshi.

== Club career ==
Wen Junjie was promoted to China League One side Hangzhou Greentown's first team squad in June 2017. On 24 June 2017, he made his debut for Hangzhou Greentown against Beijing Renhe in a 2–1 defeat. He went on to make three appearances for the club in all competitions in the 2017 season.

On 26 February 2018, Wen transferred to Chinese Super League side Tianjin Quanjian. On 18 April 2018, he made his debut for the club in a 3–2 away win against Kashiwa Reysol, coming on as a substitute for Pei Shuai in the 95th minute. After making his debut he would struggle to establish himself within the squad and was dropped to the reserves before being allowed to leave the club.

On 6 April 2021 he joined second-tier football club Meizhou Hakka as a free agent. He would make his debut in a league game on 3 September 2021 against Nanjing City in a 2–1 victory. He would be a squad player of the team that gained promotion to the top tier after coming second within the division at the end of the 2021 China League One campaign.

On 9 July 2026, Wen was loaned out to China League One side Shaanxi Union for the rest of 2026 season.

== Career statistics ==
As of match played 31 December 2025.

Appearances and goals by club, season and competition
| Club | Season | League | | | National Cup | | Continental | | Other | | Total | |
| Club | Season | Division | Apps | Goals | Apps | Goals | Apps | Goals | Apps | Goals | Apps | Goals |
|---|---|---|---|---|---|---|---|---|---|---|---|---|
| Hangzhou Greentown | 2017 | China League One | 3 | 0 | 1 | 0 | - | | - | | 4 | 0 |
| Tianjin Quanjian | 2018 | Chinese Super League | 0 | 0 | 1 | 0 | 1 | 0 | - | | 2 | 0 |
| Tianjin Quanjian | 2019 | Chinese Super League | 7 | 0 | 1 | 0 | - | | - | | 8 | 0 |
| Tianjin Quanjian | Total | | 7 | 0 | 2 | 0 | 1 | 0 | 0 | 0 | 10 | 0 |
| Meizhou Hakka | 2021 | China League One | 5 | 0 | 1 | 0 | - | | - | | 6 | 0 |
| Meizhou Hakka | 2022 | Chinese Super League | 5 | 0 | 1 | 0 | - | | - | | 6 | 0 |
| Meizhou Hakka | 2023 | Chinese Super League | 5 | 0 | 2 | 0 | - | | - | | 7 | 0 |
| Meizhou Hakka | Total | | 15 | 0 | 4 | 0 | 0 | 0 | 0 | 0 | 19 | 0 |
| Foshan Nanshi | 2024 | China League One | 27 | 0 | 2 | 0 | - | | - | | 29 | 0 |
| Suzhou Dongwu | 2025 | China League One | 12 | 0 | 1 | 0 | - | | - | | 13 | 0 |
| Foshan Nanshi | 2026 | China League One | 0 | 0 | 0 | 0 | - | | - | | 0 | 0 |
| Career total | | | 64 | 0 | 10 | 0 | 1 | 0 | 0 | 0 | 75 | 0 |
