= Liu Yi (footballer, born 1997) =

Chinese footballer

Liu Yi 刘逸
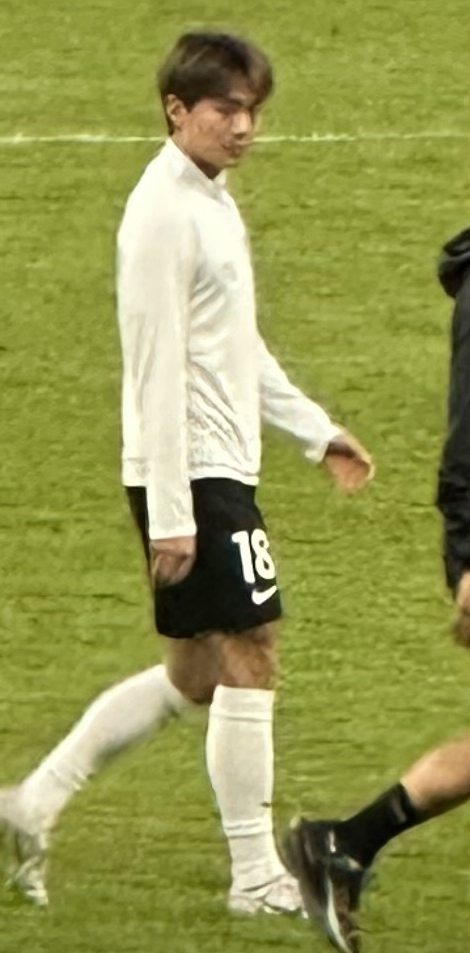
- Liu Yi in April 2025

Personal information
- Date of birth: 26 January 1997 (age 29)
- Place of birth: Guiyang, Guizhou, China
- Height: 1.76 m (5 ft 9 1/2 in)
- Position: Midfielder

Team information
- Current team: Dalian Yingbo B
- Number: 45

Youth career
- 2008–2016: Hangzhou Greentown

Senior career*
Years	Team	Apps	(Gls)
2017	Hangzhou Greentown	8	(0)
2018–2019	Tianjin Quanjian	14	(0)
2020–2022	Kunshan FC	53	(2)
2023–2024	Yunnan Yukun	42	(0)
2025–	Dalian Yingbo	3	(0)
2026–	→ Dalian Yingbo B (loan)	0	(0)

International career^{‡}
2018	China U-23	5	(0)
- * Club domestic league appearances and goals as of 26 August 2025 ‡ National team caps and goals as of 5 June 2018

Liu Yi (Chinese: 刘逸; pinyin: Liú Yì; born 26 January 1997) is a Chinese footballer who currently plays as a midfielder for Dalian Yingbo B.

== Club career ==
Liu Yi was promoted to China League One side Hangzhou Greentown's first team squad in 2017. He made his senior debut on 12 March 2017, playing the whole match in a 3–2 home win over Nei Mongol Zhongyou. He went on to make ten appearances for the club in all competitions in the 2017 season.

Liu received trial with Chinese Super League side Tianjin Quanjian in December 2017 and made an official transfer on 26 February 2018. On 2 March 2018, he made his debut for the club in a 4–0 away win against Henan Jianye, coming on as a substitute for Wang Yongpo in the 76th minute.

Liu joined second tier club Kunshan FC on 4 August 2020. He would go on to make his debut in a league game on 13 September 2020 against Sichuan Jiuniu in a 2-0 victory. This would be followed by his first goal for the club in a league game on 4 October 2020 against Nantong Zhiyun in a 1-0 victory. He would go on to establish himself as regular within the team and was part of the squad that won the division and promotion to the top tier at the end of the 2022 China League One campaign.

On 13 January 2025, Liu joined the Chinese Super League club Dalian Young Boy.

== Career statistics ==
As of 25 December 2022.

Appearances and goals by club, season and competition
Club	Season	League			National Cup		Continental		Other		Total	
Club	Season	Division	Apps	Goals	Apps	Goals	Apps	Goals	Apps	Goals	Apps	Goals
Hangzhou Greentown	2017	China League One	8	0	2	0	-		-		10	0
Tianjin Quanjian	2018	Chinese Super League	11	0	1	0	0	0	-		12	0
Tianjin Quanjian	2019	Chinese Super League	3	0	1	0	-		-		4	0
Tianjin Quanjian	Total		14	0	2	0	0	0	0	0	16	0
Kunshan FC	2020	China League One	14	1	2	0	-		-		16	1
Kunshan FC	2021	China League One	19	0	2	0	-		-		21	0
Kunshan FC	2022	China League One	20	1	0	0	-		-		20	1
Kunshan FC	Total		53	2	4	0	0	0	0	0	57	2
Career total			75	2	6	0	0	0	0	0	81	2

== Honours ==
=== Club ===
Kunshan FC

- China League One: 2022
