= Zhang Cheng (footballer) =

Chinese footballer

Zhang Cheng 张诚
Personal information
- Full name: Zhang Cheng
- Date of birth: 28 June 1989 (age 37)
- Place of birth: Tianjin, China
- Height: 1.79 m (5 ft 10 1/2 in)
- Position: Defender

Youth career
- Hedong Sports School

Senior career*
Years	Team	Apps	(Gls)
2008–2019	Tianjin Quanjian	245	(7)
2020	Jiangsu Suning	7	(0)
2021	Suzhou Dongwu	25	(3)
2022	Tianjin Fusheng		
2023	Xi'an Chongde Ronghai		
- * Club domestic league appearances and goals as of 29 April 2022

Zhang Cheng (simplified Chinese: 张诚; traditional Chinese: 張誠; pinyin: Zhāng Chéng; born 28 June 1989) is a Chinese professional footballer.

== Club career ==
Zhang Cheng joined China League Two side Tianjin Songjiang in 2008 after failing his trial at Tianjin TEDA and Tianjin Huochetou. He kept his start position in the 2016 season when Quanjian Nature Medicine took over the club. He made 27 league appearances and scored two goals as Tianjin Quanjian won the title and promoted to the Chinese Super League. He made his Super League debut on 4 March 2017 in a 2–0 away loss against Guangzhou R&F.

At thee beginning of the 2020 Chinese Super League, Zhang was allowed to join Jiangsu Suning and would go on to make his debut in a league game against Henan Jianye on 26 July 2020 in a 4-3 victory. In his debut season he would be a squad player as the team would win the title for the first time within their history.

== Career statistics ==
As of 31 December 2020.

Appearances and goals by club, season and competition
Club	Season	League			National Cup		Continental		Other		Total	
Club	Season	Division	Apps	Goals	Apps	Goals	Apps	Goals	Apps	Goals	Apps	Goals
Tianjin Quanjian	2008	China League Two	2	0	-		-		-		2	0
Tianjin Quanjian	2009	China League Two	14	0	-		-		-		14	0
Tianjin Quanjian	2010	China League Two	17	1	-		-		-		17	1
Tianjin Quanjian	2011	China League One	16	1	2	0	-		-		18	1
Tianjin Quanjian	2012	China League One	22	2	1	0	-		-		23	2
Tianjin Quanjian	2013	China League One	17	0	1	0	-		-		18	0
Tianjin Quanjian	2014	China League One	26	2	1	0	-		-		27	2
Tianjin Quanjian	2015	China League One	19	1	1	0	-		-		20	1
Tianjin Quanjian	2016	China League One	27	0	2	0	-		-		29	0
Tianjin Quanjian	2017	Chinese Super League	29	0	3	0	-		-		32	0
Tianjin Quanjian	2018	Chinese Super League	28	0	0	0	10	2	-		38	2
Tianjin Quanjian	2019	Chinese Super League	28	0	1	0	-		-		29	0
Tianjin Quanjian	Total		245	7	12	0	10	2	0	0	267	9
Jiangsu Suning	2020	Chinese Super League	7	0	4	2	-		-		11	2
Career total			252	7	16	2	10	2	0	0	278	11

== Honours ==
=== Club ===
Tianjin Quanjian

- China League One: 2016

Jiangsu Suning

- Chinese Super League: 2020
