= Wang Jie (footballer, born 1989) =

Chinese footballer

Wang Jie 王杰
Personal information
- Full name: Wang Jie
- Date of birth: 14 January 1989 (age 37)
- Place of birth: Nantong, Jiangsu, China
- Height: 1.84 m (6 ft 1/2 in)
- Positions: Defensive midfielder; centre-back

Team information
- Current team: Nantong Zhiyun
- Number: 3

Youth career
- Jiangsu Sainty

Senior career*
Years	Team	Apps	(Gls)
2010–2013	Jiangsu Sainty	0	(0)
2013	Shenzhen Fengpeng	6	(0)
2014–2019	Tianjin Tianhai	114	(2)
2020–2021	Changchun Yatai	5	(0)
2022-	Nantong Zhiyun	28	(1)
- * Club domestic league appearances and goals as of 31 December 2022

Wang Jie (simplified Chinese: 王杰; traditional Chinese: 王傑; pinyin: Wáng Jié; born 14 January 1989) is a Chinese footballer who currently plays as a defensive midfielder or centre-back for Nantong Zhiyun.

== Club career ==
Wang Jie started his professional football career in 2010 when he was promoted to Chinese Super League side Jiangsu Sainty's first squad. He failed to establish himself within the team and transferred to China League Two side Shenzhen Fengpeng in July 2013. In January 2014, Wang moved to China League One side Tianjin Songjiang on a free transfer.

At Tianjin he scored his first senior goal on 4 May 2014 in a 2–1 home victory against Yanbian FC. Wang kept his starting position in the 2016 season when Quanjian Nature Medicine took over the club. He made 27 league appearances as Tianjin Quanjian won the title and promoted to the Chinese Super League. He made his Super League debut on 4 March 2017 in a 2–0 away loss against Guangzhou R&F. On 8 April 2018, Wang scored the winner as well as his first goal in the Super League in a 1–0 away win over Guizhou Hengfeng. On 15 May 2018, he scored the equalizer in the second leg of round of 16 of 2018 AFC Champions League against Guangzhou Evergrande as Tianjin Quanjian advanced to the quarter-finals on away goals. Unfortunately this would be the highlight of his time at the club because the owners would face financial difficulties and at the end of the 2019 Chinese Super League season, dissolved the club.

On 1 July 2020, Wang joined second tier club Changchun Yatai. He would go on to be part of the team that gained promotion to the top tier and won the 2020 China League One division title. The following season he would struggle to gain any playing time and on 26 April 2022 he would return to Jiangsu to join second tier club Nantong Zhiyun. He would go on to make his debut for them in a league game on 8 June 2022 against Suzhou Dongwu in a 1-0 victory. He would go on to establish himself within the team and helped the club gain promotion to the top tier at the end of the 2022 China League One season.

== Career statistics ==
As of 31 December 2022.

Appearances and goals by club, season and competition
Club	Season	League			National Cup		Continental		Other		Total	
Club	Season	Division	Apps	Goals	Apps	Goals	Apps	Goals	Apps	Goals	Apps	Goals
Jiangsu Sainty	2010	Chinese Super League	0	0	-		-		-		0	0
Jiangsu Sainty	2011	Chinese Super League	0	0	0	0	-		-		0	0
Jiangsu Sainty	2012	Chinese Super League	0	0	0	0	-		-		0	0
Jiangsu Sainty	2013	Chinese Super League	0	0	0	0	0	0	-		0	0
Jiangsu Sainty	Total		0	0	0	0	0	0	0	0	0	0
Shenzhen Fengpeng	2013	China League Two	6	0	0	0	-		-		6	0
Tianjin Songjiang/ Tianjin Quanjian/ Tianjin Tianhai	2014	China League One	22	1	2	0	-		-		24	1
Tianjin Songjiang/ Tianjin Quanjian/ Tianjin Tianhai	2015	China League One	26	0	1	0	-		-		27	0
Tianjin Songjiang/ Tianjin Quanjian/ Tianjin Tianhai	2016	China League One	27	0	1	0	-		-		28	0
Tianjin Songjiang/ Tianjin Quanjian/ Tianjin Tianhai	2017	Chinese Super League	16	0	3	0	-		-		19	0
Tianjin Songjiang/ Tianjin Quanjian/ Tianjin Tianhai	2018	Chinese Super League	20	1	1	0	7	1	-		28	2
Tianjin Songjiang/ Tianjin Quanjian/ Tianjin Tianhai	2019	Chinese Super League	3	0	1	0	-		-		4	0
Tianjin Songjiang/ Tianjin Quanjian/ Tianjin Tianhai	Total		114	2	9	0	7	1	0	0	130	3
Changchun Yatai	2020	China League One	5	0	0	0	-		-		5	0
Changchun Yatai	2021	Chinese Super League	0	0	0	0	-		-		0	0
Changchun Yatai	Total		5	0	0	0	0	0	0	0	0	0
Nantong Zhiyun	2022	China League One	28	1	0	0	-		-		28	1
Career total			153	3	9	0	7	1	0	0	169	4

== Honours ==
=== Club ===
Tianjin Quanjian F.C.

- China League One: 2016

Changchun Yatai

- China League One: 2020
