= Han Jinming =

Chinese footballer and coach

Personal information
- Date of birth: 28 February 1969 (age 57)
- Place of birth: Tianjin, China
- Position: Midfielder

Youth career
- Tianjin

Senior career*
| Years | Team | Apps | (Gls) |
| 1987–1989 | Tianjin II | | |
| 1990 | China Olympic XI | 14 | (1) |
| 1991–1996 | Tianjin Sumsang | 36 | (4) |
| 1997–1998 | Qianwei Huandao | 36 | (1) |
| 1999 | Tianjin Teda | 6 | (0) |
| 2000 | Yunnan Hongta | 0 | (0) |

International career
| 1993–1996 | China | 4 | (0) |

Managerial career
- 2007: Hohhot Binhai
- 2010–2012: Tianjin Songjiang F.C. (Assist)
- * Club domestic league appearances and goals

Han Jinming (Chinese: 韩金铭; born 28 February 1969) is a Chinese football coach and a former international midfielder who played for China in the 1996 Asian Cup. While in his club career his representation of Tianjin Sumsang saw him captain the team from 1993 until 1996 before leaving for Qianwei Huandao and Yunnan Hongta where he was forced to retire due to serious injury in 2000.

== Playing career ==
Han Jinming started his career in 1987 playing for the Tianjin youth team who were allowed to take part in the Chinese league pyramid. He was soon called up to the Chinese under-23 team who were also allowed to take part in the 1990 Chinese league pyramid. Upon his return he was promoted to the senior team of Tianjin where he became their captain in 1993 as well as breaking into the senior Chinese national team, whom he represented at the 1996 Asian Cup. After the tournament Han joined Qianwei Huandao and Yunnan Hongta before returning to Tianjin for a brief period before he had to retire due to injury.

== Management career ==
After he retired in 2000 Han immediately moved into youth management in Tianshui, Gansu where he impressed the Chinese Football Association who offered him a job as a scout and training lecturer for them. In 2007 Han received his first management job at Hohhot Binhai, however this only lasted for one season.
