= Hedong Sports Centre =

Sports venue in Tianjin, China

Coordinates: 39°06′47″N 117°14′02″E

Hedong Sports Centre (Simplified Chinese: 河东体育中心) is a multi-use stadium in Tianjin, China. It is currently used mostly for soccer matches. The stadium holds 12,000 people.
