= Zhuang Jiajie =

Chinese footballer

Zhuang Jiajie 庄佳杰
Personal information
- Full name: Zhuang Jiajie
- Date of birth: 5 September 1993 (age 33)
- Place of birth: Lufeng, Guangdong, China
- Height: 1.75 m (5 ft 9 in)
- Positions: Attacking midfielder; forward

Youth career
- Shenzhen Yantian Sports School
- 2006–2012: Hangzhou Greentown
- 2011–2012: → FC Dallas (loan)

Senior career*
Years	Team	Apps	(Gls)
2011	Wenzhou Provenza	7	(1)
2013–2017	Hangzhou Greentown	7	(0)
2018–2020	Hunan Billows	27	(12)
2019	→ Qingdao Huanghai (loan)	4	(0)
2020	Zibo Cuju	6	(0)
2021	Xinjiang Tianshan Leopard	29	(6)
2022	Hubei Istar	4	(1)
2022–2023	Guangxi Lanhang	5	(1)
2024	Shenzhen Juniors	8	(1)
2024	Ganzhou Ruishi	12	(4)
2025	Tai'an Tiankuang	10	(1)

International career
2010	China U-17		
2010–2011	China U-20		
- * Club domestic league appearances and goals as of 6 May 2022

Zhuang Jiajie (Chinese: 庄佳杰; pinyin: Zhuāng Jiājié; born 5 September 1993) is a Chinese footballer who plays as a left-footed attacking midfielder or forward.

== Club career ==
Zhuang joined Hangzhou Greentown youth team system from Shenzhen Yantian Sports School in 2006. In 2011, he was loan to China League Two side Wenzhou Provenza for one year and scored his first league goal in a 3–1 away defeat against Hubei CTGU Kangtian on 25 June. He was sent to Major League Soccer club FC Dallas one year for further training on 17 August 2011. Zhuang returned to Hangzhou Greentown and joined the club's reserved team in July 2012. He was promoted to first team squad by Takeshi Okada in 2013 and could not make any appearance in the 2013 season. On 18 May 2014, he made his Chinese Super League debut in a 4–1 home defeat against Guangzhou Evergrande. Zhuang was demoted to the Greentown reserved team in the 2017 season.

On 9 March 2018, Zhuang transferred to China League Two side Hunan Billows. He scored 12 goals in 27 appearances for the club in the 2018 season.

Zhuang signed a contract with China League One side Qingdao Huanghai in February 2019.

== International career ==
Zhuang was first called up into China U-17's squad in March 2010, and received his first called up for China U-20 by Su Maozhen in December 2010. He played for China U-20 in the 2011 Toulon Tournament and 2011 Weifang Cup. He scored 1 goals in 3 appearances in 2012 AFC U-19 Championship qualification as China U-20 managed to qualify into the 2012 AFC U-19 Championship in November 2011.

== Career statistics ==
As of 7 September 2021.

Appearances and goals by club, season and competition
Club	Season	League			National Cup		Continental		Other		Total	
Club	Season	Division	Apps	Goals	Apps	Goals	Apps	Goals	Apps	Goals	Apps	Goals
Wenzhou Provenza (loan)	2011	China League Two	7	1	-		-		-		7	1
Hangzhou Greentown	2013	Chinese Super League	0	0	0	0	-		-		0	0
Hangzhou Greentown	2014	Chinese Super League	2	0	2	0	-		-		4	0
Hangzhou Greentown	2015	Chinese Super League	0	0	0	0	-		-		0	0
Hangzhou Greentown	2016	Chinese Super League	5	0	2	0	-		-		7	0
Hangzhou Greentown	Total		7	0	4	0	0	0	0	0	11	0
Hunan Billows	2018	China League Two	27	12	2	2	-		-		29	14
Qingdao Huanghai (loan)	2019	China League One	4	0	0	0	-		-		4	0
Zibo Cuju	2020	China League Two	6	0	-		-		-		6	0
Xinjiang Tianshan Leopard	2021	China League One	15	1	0	0	-		-		15	1
Career total			66	14	6	2	0	0	0	0	72	16

== Honours ==
=== Club ===
Qingdao Huanghai

- China League One: 2019
