= Busan FC =

2017–2018 South Korean football club

Busan FC 부산 FC
- Full name: Busan Football Club
- Founded: 2017; 8 years ago
- Dissolved: 2018; 7 years ago
- Ground: Busan Asiad Stadium
- League: K3 League Basic
- 2018: 3rd
- Website: http://busanfc.org
Home colours	Away colours

Busan Football Club (Korean: 부산 FC) was a South Korean football club based in Busan. The club was a member of the K3 League Basic, an semi-professional league football in South Korea, from the 2017 season to 2018 season.

== Players ==
2019 Season Players
Player name	Position	Date of birth (age)
Sang-Min Ku	Goalkeeper	31 October 1991 (27)
Hyeong-keun Kim	Goalkeeper	6 January 1994 (25)
Jeong-ho Kim	Goalkeeper	7 April 1998 (21)
Kyeong-min Park	Defender	2 August 1999 (19)
Aleksandar Susnjar	Centre-Back	19 August 1995 (23)
Ho-jeong Jeong	Centre-Back	13 December 1993 (25)
Jin-yeong Kwon	Centre-Back	23 October 1991 (27)
Cheong-ung Lee	Centre-Back	15 March 1992 (26)
Haeng-seok No	Centre-Back	17 November 1988 (30)
Myeong-jun Kim	Centre-Back	13 May 1994 (24)
Ho-yeong Park	Centre-Back	7 April 1999 (20)
Jun-ho Hwang	Centre-Back	4 May 1998 (20)
Chi-uh Kim	Left-Back	11 November 1983 (23)
Mun-hwan Kim	Right-Back	1 August 1995 (23)
Jun-kang Park	Right-Back	6 June 1991 (27)
Jong-min Lee	Right-Back	1 September 1983 (35)
Sang-jun Lee	Right-back	14 October 1999 (19)
Jong-cheol Kim	Midfielder	24 February 1997 (22)
Jong-uh Park	Defensive Midfield	10 March 1989 (30)
Jun-kyu Han	Defensive Midfield	10 February 1996 (23)
Hu-kwon Lee	Central midfield	30 October 1990 (28)
Yong-deok Seo	Right Midfield	10 September 1989 (29)
Sang-un Han	Attacking Midfield	3 May 1986 (32)
Romulo	Attacking Midfield	27 October 1995 (23)
Chang-ryeol Shin	Forward	22 July 1996 (22)
Yong-hyeon Kwon	Right Winger	23 October 1991 (27)
Dong-jun Lee	Right Winger	1 February 1997 (22)
Jin-kyu Kim	Right Winger	24 February 1997 (22)
Jeong-hyeob Lee	Centre-Forward	24 June 1991 (27)
Diego Mauricio	Centre-Forward	25 June 1991 (27)
Soma Novothny	Centre-Forward	16 June 1994 (24)
Ji-ho Han	Centre-Forward	15 December 1998 (30)
Seong-min	Centre-Forward	2 May 1989 (29)
Seung-in Choi	Centre-Forward	5 March 1991 (28)

== Honours ==
=== Season-by-season records ===
Season	Teams	Tier	Placement	Pld	W	D	L	GF	GA	GD	Pts	League Cup	FA Cup	Manager
2017	9	K3 Basic	7th	16	6	3	7	34	35	-1	21	–	–	
2018	11	K3 Basic	3rd	20	12	4	4	46	17	+29	40	–	–	Kim Jong-mun

== See also ==
- List of football clubs in South Korea
