= Kwon Kyung-won =

South Korean footballer (born 1992)

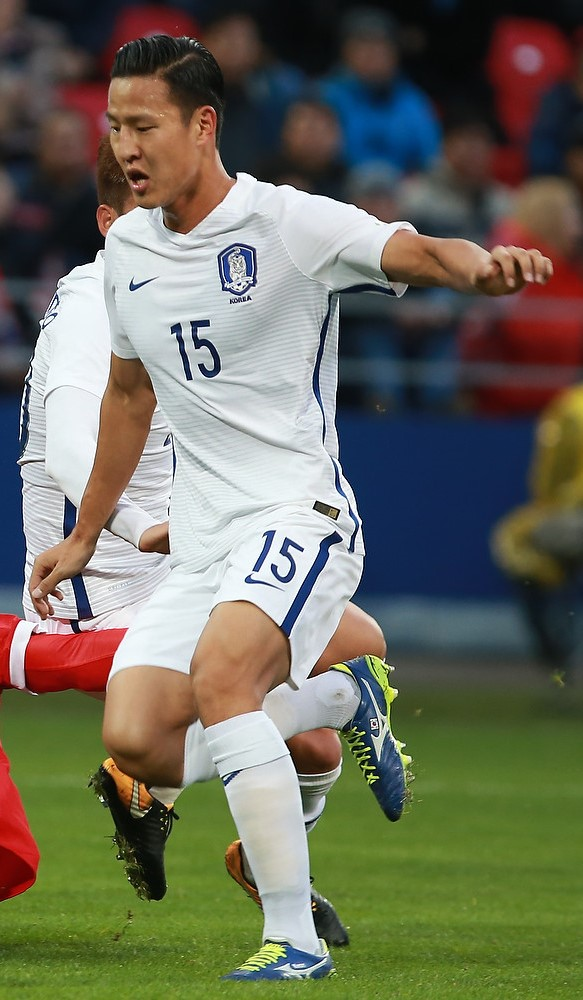
- Kyung-won with South Korea in 2017

Personal information
- Full name: Kwon Kyung-won
- Date of birth: 31 January 1992 (age 34)
- Place of birth: Seoul, South Korea
- Height: 1.88 m (6 ft 2 in)
- Positions: Centre back; defensive midfielder

Team information
- Current team: FC Anyang
- Number: 21

Youth career
- 2007–2010: Jeonju Youngsaeng High School (Youth)

College career
Years	Team	Apps	(Gls)
2010–2013	Dong-a University		

Senior career*
Years	Team	Apps	(Gls)
2013–2014	Jeonbuk Hyundai Motors	25	(0)
2015–2017	Shabab Al Ahli	45	(4)
2017–2021	Tianjin Tianhai	62	(1)
2019	→ Jeonbuk Hyundai Motors (loan)	13	(2)
2020–2021	→ Gimcheon Sangmu (draft)	23	(1)
2021	Seongnam FC	18	(1)
2022–2023	Gamba Osaka	36	(3)
2024	Suwon FC	21	(1)
2024–2025	Khor Fakkan	22	(1)
2025–	FC Anyang	23	(0)

International career^{‡}
2013–2014	South Korea U23	4	(0)
2017–	South Korea	35	(2)
Medal record
Men's football
Representing South Korea
EAFF Championship
Winner	2017 Japan	Team
Winner	2019 South Korea	Team
Runner-up	2022 Japan	Team
- * Club domestic league appearances and goals as of 13 May 2026 ‡ National team caps and goals as of 5 June 2025

- Kwon Kyung-won
- Hangul: 권경원
- Hanja: 權敬原
- RR: Gwon Gyeongwon
- MR: Kwŏn Kyŏngwŏn

Kwon Kyung-won (Korean: 권경원; born 31 January 1992) is a South Korean professional footballer who plays as a left-footed centre back or a defensive midfielder for K League 1 club FC Anyang and the South Korea national team.

== Club career ==
He was selected by Jeonbuk Hyundai Motors in the 2010 K-League draft and entered Dong-a University. He joined Jeonbuk before the 2013 season started.

In February 2015, Kwon signed for Al Ahli Dubai on a three-year contract making him the club's designated Asian player.

In January 2017, Kwon signed for Tianjin Tianhai on a five-year contract making him the club's designated Asian player.

On 3 July 2019, Kwon joined Jeonbuk Hyundai Motors on a loan deal until the end of 2019 seaseon.

On 1 January 2022, Kwon signed for J1 League club Gamba Osaka.

== International career ==
In May 2018 he was named in South Korea's preliminary 28 man squad for the 2018 FIFA World Cup in Russia. However, he did not make the final 23.

== Career statistics ==
=== Club ===
As of match played 13 May 2026.

Appearances and goals by club, season and competition
Club	Season	League			National Cup (Note: Includes Korean FA Cup, UAE President's Cup, Chinese FA Cup, Emperor's Cup)		League Cup (Note: Includes UAE League Cup, J.League Cup)		Continental		Other		Total	
Club	Season	Division	Apps	Goals	Apps	Goals	Apps	Goals	Apps	Goals	Apps	Goals	Apps	Goals
Jeonbuk Hyundai Motors	2013	K League 1	20	0	1	0	—		4 (Note: Appearances in AFC Champions League)	0	—		25	0
Jeonbuk Hyundai Motors	2014	K League 1	5	0	3	0	—		1	0	—		9	0
Jeonbuk Hyundai Motors	Total		25	0	4	0	—		5	0	—		34	0
Shabab Al Ahli	2014–15	UAE Pro League	11	1	2	0	—		14	1	1 (Note: Appearance in UAE Super Cup)	0	28	2
Shabab Al Ahli	2015–16	UAE Pro League	23	2	2	0	3	0	—		—		28	2
Shabab Al Ahli	2016–17	UAE Pro League	11	1	1	0	6	0	—		1	0	19	1
Shabab Al Ahli	Total		45	4	5	0	9	0	14	1	2	0	75	5
Tianjin Quanjian/ Tianjin Tianhai	2017	Chinese Super League	21	1	2	0	—		—		—		23	1
Tianjin Quanjian/ Tianjin Tianhai	2018	Chinese Super League	26	0	1	0	—		11	0	—		38	0
Tianjin Quanjian/ Tianjin Tianhai	2019	Chinese Super League	15	0	0	0	—		—		—		15	0
Tianjin Quanjian/ Tianjin Tianhai	Total		62	1	3	0	—		11	0	—		76	1
Jeonbuk Hyundai Motors (loan)	2019	K League 1	13	2	—		—		—		—		13	2
Gimcheon Sangmu (draft)	2020	K League 1	23	1	0	0	—		—		—		23	1
Gimcheon Sangmu (draft)	2021	K League 2	0	0	0	0	—		—		—		0	0
Gimcheon Sangmu (draft)	Total		23	1	0	0	—		—		—		23	1
Seongnam FC	2021	K League 1	18	1	0	0	—		—		—		18	1
Gamba Osaka	2022	J1 League	16	2	0	0	3	0	—		—		19	2
Gamba Osaka	2023	J1 League	20	1	1	0	2	0	—		—		23	1
Gamba Osaka	Total		36	3	1	0	5	0	—		—		42	3
Suwon FC	2024	K League 1	21	1	0	0	—		—		—		21	1
Khor Fakkan	2024–25	UAE Pro League	22	1	1	0	1	0	—		—		24	1
FC Anyang	2025	K League 1	12	0	—		—		—		—		12	0
FC Anyang	2026	K League 1	11	0	0	0	—		—		—		11	0
FC Anyang	Total		23	0	0	0	0	0	—		—		23	0
Total			288	14	14	0	15	0	30	1	2	0	349	15

=== International ===
As of match played 5 June 2025

Appearances and goals by national team and year
National team	Year	Apps	Goals
South Korea	2017	4	1
South Korea	2018	3	0
South Korea	2019	7	0
South Korea	2021	2	1
South Korea	2022	12	0
South Korea	2024	2	0
South Korea	2025	3	0
Career total		35	2

Results list South Korea's goal tally first.

#	Date	Venue	Opponent	Score	Result	Competition
1.	7 October 2017	VEB Arena, Moscow, Russia	Russia	1–4	2–4	Friendly
2.	14 November 2020	Stadion Wiener Neustadt, Wiener Neustadt, Austria	Mexico	2–3	2–3	Friendly

== Honours ==
Al-Ahli

- UAE Pro League: 2015–16
- UAE League Cup: 2016–17
- UAE Super Cup: 2014, 2016

Jeonbuk Hyundai Motors

- K League 1: 2014, 2019

South Korea

- EAFF Championship: 2017, 2019

Individual

- AFC Champions League Dream Team: 2015
- UAE Pro League Dream Team: 2015–16
- K League 1 Best XI: 2020
