= Zhang Lu (goalkeeper) =

Chinese footballer

Zhang Lu 张鹭
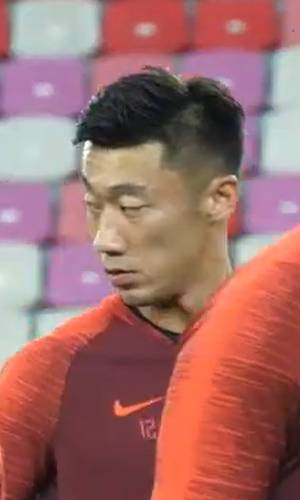
- Zhang Lu in September 2019

Personal information
- Full name: Zhang Lu
- Date of birth: 6 September 1987 (age 39)
- Place of birth: Tianjin, China
- Height: 1.92 m (6 ft 3 1/2 in)
- Position: Goalkeeper

Youth career
- 2002–2003: Tianjin Locomotive
- 2004: Liaoning Whowin

Senior career*
Years	Team	Apps	(Gls)
2005–2015	Liaoning Whowin	231	(0)
2016–2019	Tianjin Quanjian	112	(0)
2020–2022	Shenzhen FC	40	(0)
Total		383	(0)
- * Club domestic league appearances and goals

Zhang Lu (Chinese: 张鹭; pinyin: Zhāng Lù; Mandarin pronunciation: [ʈʂáŋ.lû]; born 6 September 1987 in Tianjin) is a Chinese former footballer.

== Club career ==
Zhang Lu started his football career with Liaoning Whowin in 2005 after graduating from their youth team. Despite his age, he had quickly established himself within the Liaoning squad in his debut season. However while he had firmly established himself as the first choice goalkeeper, by the 2008 league season, he saw them relegated to the second tier. Despite this setback, Zhang remained with Liaoning and helped the team win the second division title as well as promotion back to the top tier after only one season.

On 12 January 2016, Zhang transferred to his hometown club Tianjin Quanjian in the China League One. In his first season with the club he would go on to establish himself as their first-choice goalkeeper and win the division title along with promotion to the Chinese Super League. He would establish himself as a vital member of the team and aided them to their highest ever position of third and qualification to the AFC Champions League for the first time in their history.

On 18 September 2019, Zhang has inspected by Traffic Police. A blood test showed that his blood alcohol content was 253.3 mg/100ml (0.2533%). He was detained on 21 September on suspicion of driving under the influence. Chinese Football Association also decided to cancel Zhang's training and competition qualifications for the National Team. He was sentenced to four months' probation on 26 September 2019.

In July 2020, Zhang was one of eight former Tianjin Tianhai players to sign with Shenzhen FC. He would make his debut for Shenzhen in a league game on 28 October 2020 against Shijiazhuang Ever Bright that ended in a 1–0 victory.

On 29 January 2026, Zhang was given a lifetime ban for match-fixing by the Chinese Football Association.

== International career ==
Zhang was included in the preliminary squad to take part in the 2008 Summer Olympics, however he was the third choice keeper and did not make the final eighteen man final squad. While he had limited time with the youth team, he would still go on to make his senior debut for the China national football team in a friendly against Portugal on 3 March 2010 in a 2–0 defeat, however the game was not recognised by FIFA.

== Personal life ==
Zhang was married to Chen Mi (陈密), an anchor of Liaoning Television, on 9 November 2013.

== Career statistics ==
Statistics accurate as of match played 31 December 2022.

Appearances and goals by club, season and competition
Club	Season	League			National Cup		League Cup		Continental		Total	
Club	Season	Division	Apps	Goals	Apps	Goals	Apps	Goals	Apps	Goals	Apps	Goals
Liaoning Whowin	2004	Chinese Super League	0	0	0	0	0	0	-		0	0
Liaoning Whowin	2005	Chinese Super League	5	0	1	0	1	0	-		7	0
Liaoning Whowin	2006	Chinese Super League	17	0	1	0	-		-		18	0
Liaoning Whowin	2007	Chinese Super League	20	0	-		-		-		20	0
Liaoning Whowin	2008	Chinese Super League	19	0	-		-		-		19	0
Liaoning Whowin	2009	China League One	24	0	-		-		-		24	0
Liaoning Whowin	2010	Chinese Super League	25	0	-		-		-		25	0
Liaoning Whowin	2011	Chinese Super League	21	0	2	0	-		-		23	0
Liaoning Whowin	2012	Chinese Super League	30	0	4	0	-		-		34	0
Liaoning Whowin	2013	Chinese Super League	15	0	1	0	-		-		16	0
Liaoning Whowin	2014	Chinese Super League	29	0	1	0	-		-		30	0
Liaoning Whowin	2015	Chinese Super League	26	0	0	0	-		-		26	0
Liaoning Whowin	Total		231	0	10	0	1	0	0	0	242	0
Tianjin Quanjian	2016	China League One	30	0	2	0	-		-		32	0
Tianjin Quanjian	2017	Chinese Super League	30	0	2	0	-		-		32	0
Tianjin Quanjian	2018	Chinese Super League	30	0	0	0	-		10	0	40	0
Tianjin Quanjian	2019	Chinese Super League	22	0	1	0	-		-		23	0
Tianjin Quanjian	Total		112	0	5	0	0	0	10	0	127	0
Shenzhen FC	2020	Chinese Super League	4	0	0	0	-		-		4	0
Shenzhen FC	2021	Chinese Super League	22	0	3	0	-		-		25	0
Shenzhen FC	2022	Chinese Super League	14	0	0	0	-		-		14	0
Shenzhen FC	Total		40	0	3	0	0	0	0	0	43	0
Career total			383	0	18	0	1	0	10	0	412	0

== Honours ==
=== Club ===
Liaoning Whowin

- China League One: 2009

Tianjin Quanjian

- China League One: 2016
