= Pei Shuai =

Chinese footballer (born 1993)

Pei Shuai 裴帅
Personal information
- Date of birth: 14 January 1993 (age 33)
- Place of birth: Shenyang, Liaoning, China
- Height: 1.85 m (6 ft 1 in)
- Position: Midfielder

Youth career
- 2007–2010: Changchun Yatai

Senior career*
Years	Team	Apps	(Gls)
2011–2017	Changchun Yatai	136	(6)
2017–2019	Tianjin Tianhai	48	(0)
2020–2023	Shenzhen FC	65	(4)
2024	Qingdao West Coast	3	(0)
2024	Shaanxi Union	9	(3)

International career^{‡}
2010	China U17		
2011–2012	China U19		
2017	China	1	(0)
- * Club domestic league appearances and goals as of 31 December 2022 ‡ National team caps and goals as of 14 January 2017

Pei Shuai
- Simplified Chinese: 裴帅
- Traditional Chinese: 裴帥
Transcriptions
Standard Mandarin
- Hanyu Pinyin: Péi Shuài
- IPA: [pʰěɪ ʂwâɪ]

Pei Shuai (Chinese: 裴帅; pinyin: Péi Shuài; born 14 January 1993) is a Chinese professional footballer who plays as midfielder

== Club career ==
Pei joined Changchun Yatai at the age of 14 in 2007. He was promoted to Changchun Yatai's first team squad by head coach Shen Xiangfu in 2011. His impressive performance in the reserve team league earned him a chance to play for the first team. Pei made his senior debut for Yatai on 11 May 2011, in a Chinese FA Cup second round fixture against Tianjin Runyulong, which Yatai won 4-0, and Pei assisted the third goal for Wang Dong in the match. He made his Chinese Super League debut as a substitute in a 1–0 away defeat against Jiangsu Sainty 4 days later. On 18 September 2011, he scored his first senior goal for Changchun in a 2–1 home victory over Guangzhou Evergrande. He scored the winning goal of the match in 84th minute, which ended Guangzhou's 44-league-match unbeaten run.

On 1 July 2017, Pei transferred to fellow Super League side Tianjin Quanjian. He made his debut for the club one day later in a 4–3 home win against Guangzhou Evergrande, coming on as a substitute for Wang Yongpo in the 89th minute. On 24 April 2018, he scored his first goal for the club in a 3–0 away win over Dalian Boyoung in the 2018 Chinese FA Cup.

On 24 February 2020, Pei joined Chinese Super League club Shenzhen F.C. He made his debut for Shenzhen on 26 July 2020, in the opening league game of the delayed 2020 season, a 3-0 win over Guangzhou R&F.

== International career ==
On 14 January 2017, Pei made his debut for China national team in the third-place playoff of 2017 China Cup against Croatia.

== Career statistics ==
Statistics accurate as of match played 31 December 2022.

Appearances and goals by club, season and competition
Club	Season	League			National Cup		Continental		Other		Total	
Club	Season	Division	Apps	Goals	Apps	Goals	Apps	Goals	Apps	Goals	Apps	Goals
Changchun Yatai	2011	Chinese Super League	19	1	2	0	-		-		21	1
Changchun Yatai	2012	Chinese Super League	20	1	2	0	-		-		22	1
Changchun Yatai	2013	Chinese Super League	18	0	1	0	-		-		19	0
Changchun Yatai	2014	Chinese Super League	20	0	1	0	-		-		21	0
Changchun Yatai	2015	Chinese Super League	26	2	0	0	-		-		26	2
Changchun Yatai	2016	Chinese Super League	24	2	0	0	-		-		24	2
Changchun Yatai	2017	Chinese Super League	9	0	0	0	-		-		9	0
Changchun Yatai	Total		136	6	6	0	0	0	0	0	142	6
Tianjin Tianhai	2017	Chinese Super League	11	0	2	0	-		-		13	0
Tianjin Tianhai	2018	Chinese Super League	16	0	2	1	6	0	-		24	1
Tianjin Tianhai	2019	Chinese Super League	21	0	1	0	-		-		22	0
Tianjin Tianhai	Total		48	0	5	1	6	0	0	0	59	1
Shenzhen F.C.	2020	Chinese Super League	16	0	0	0	-		-		16	0
Shenzhen F.C.	2021	Chinese Super League	10	1	4	0	-		-		14	1
Shenzhen F.C.	2022	Chinese Super League	16	2	1	0	-		-		17	2
Shenzhen F.C.	Total		42	3	5	0	0	0	0	0	47	1
Career total			226	9	16	1	6	0	0	0	248	10
