= Quanjian Group =

Chinese herbal medicine company

Quanjian Group Co., Ltd. (Chinese: 权健集团有限公司) is a Chinese herbal medicine company based in Tianjin. The group is the parent company of Quanjian Nature Medicine Technology Development Co., Ltd. (Chinese: 权健自然医学科技发展有限公司) for about 75.36% stake.

In January 2019, law enforcement from Tianjin, arrested the owner of Quanjian Group as well as other people, accusing them for illegal multi-level marketing (multi-level marketing is illegal in Mainland China, but direct selling is not) and false advertisement on the product of Quanjian.

== Football ==
The group was the ultimate parent company of Tianjin Quanjian F.C., which was a wholly owned subsidiary of Quanjian Nature Medicine. The Chinese Football Association also rejected Jiangsu Fengdong Thermal Technology, a listed associate company of Quanjian Group, to sponsor Jiangsu Yancheng Dingli F.C. in January 2016.

Quanjian Group is the parent company of Dalian Quanjian F.C., which the group owned 80% stake of the women football club.
