= Tianjin Tianhai F.C. =

Chinese football club

Tianjin Tianhai Tiānjīn Tiānhǎi 天津天海
- Full name: Tianjin Tianhai Football Club 天津天海足球俱乐部
- Founded: 6 June 2006; 20 years ago (as Hohhot Binhai F.C.)
- Dissolved: 12 May 2019; 7 years ago
- Ground: Tianjin Olympic Center Stadium
- Capacity: 60,000
- 2019: Super League, 14th
Home colours	Away colours

Tianjin Tianhai F.C. (Chinese: 天津天海足球俱乐部; pinyin: Tiānjīn Tiānhǎi Zúqiú Jùlèbù; Mandarin pronunciation: [tʰjɛ́n.tɕín.tʰjɛ́n.xàɪ]) was a Chinese football club. The team was based in Tianjin.

== History ==
=== 2006-2010: Formation and League Two ===
On June 6, 2006, the Tianjin Binhai Holdings Limited company would form a new football team based in Hohhot called Hohhot Binhai and would name former Chinese international player Han Jinming as their manager. They would move into the Hohhot People's Stadium while taking part at the bottom of the Chinese pyramid within the third tier at the start of the 2007 league season. By May 5, 2007, Tianjin Songjiang Sports Culture Industry Co. Ltd would take a controlling interest within the club and hired another former Chinese international player in Hao Haidong to be the club's general manager. When the club finished in a disappointing fifth within the group stages of the division it was decided that the club needed significant restructuring, which saw Hao Haidong named as chairman, Han Jinming moved to General management, Zhang Xiaorui was named as the new manager and lastly the entire team was moved to Tianjin to play within the Hedong Sports Centre. While under Zhang Xiaorui's reign results gradually improved, however while the club were constant play-off contenders they could not gain promotion and he was soon replaced by the Belgium Patrick De Wilde who guided the club to a runners-up spot and promotion at the end of the 2010 league season.

=== 2011-2016: League One ===
By the 2011 season the club had already moved into the 60,000 seater Tianjin Olympic Center Stadium, however despite their grand settings the team would struggle within the division and narrowly avoided relegation at the end of the season. This saw Patrick De Wilde exit soon after and the club decided to promote his assistant as well as Hao Haidong's cousin Hao Haitao into the management chair. In the 2012 league season Hao Haitao would actually guide the club to their best ever finish of sixth within the league, however at the end of the campaign Li Weiqi (李微奇) took over Hao Haidong's position as chairman and Hao Haitao followed his cousin in leaving the club. At the start of the 2013 league season Pei Encai was brought in as Head coach, however he left the team four games before the end of the season due to the death of his mother, which saw Zhang Xiaorui return to the club as a caretaker manager. Italian Gianni Bortoletto was brought in at the beginning of the 2014 league season, initially as a technical director before accepting the Head coach position but after a series of disappointing results he was fired on 14 June 2014. On 23 June 2014 Portuguese manager Manuel Cajuda came in for the remainder of the season. The club would once again start the following season with a new manager when Croatian coach Dražen Besek joined the team 15 December 2014. After a series of defeats, Besek was replaced by another Croatian in Goran Tomić who joined the management on 12 May 2015.

On 7 July 2015 Quanjian Nature Medicine officially took over the club. This would be their second foray into Chinese football after their sponsorship of Tianjin Teda F.C. abruptly came to an end on 30 June 2015 after a public dispute occurred on who had control over the club's player transfers, particularly in the attempted signing of the Chinese international player Sun Ke. At the start of the 2016 season the club would go through a complete overhaul, they would redesign a new badge that reflected Quanjian Nature Medicine's own logo, change the club's colours to a light blue, bring in experienced Brazilian coach Vanderlei Luxemburgo along with international players in Luís Fabiano, Jádson Rodrigues da Silva, Zhao Xuri and the player the owners originally attempted to sign, Sun Ke. On 22 October 2016, under the guidance of Fabio Cannavaro, Tianjin Quanjian defeated Meizhou Hakka 3–0 to win the 2016 China League One title and gain promotion to the 2017 Chinese Super League.

=== 2017-2019: Super League Era ===
At the start of the 2017 Chinese Super League season the owners once again decided to change the team's home colours from a light blue to an all red uniform. After signing a world-class midfielder in Axel Witsel, the club cruised to third place in the 2017 season and advance to the 2018 AFC Champions League, qualifying to the continental tournament for the first time.

Quanjian Group was accused of illegal multi-level marketing and false advertisement in December 2018. After the arrest of club leader and Quanjian Group owner Shu Yuhui, the club asked the local FA to take over operations and changed its name to Tianjin Tianhai in January 2019.

On 12 May 2020, Tianjin Tianhai announced that the club was dissolved. This disbandment saved Shenzhen Kaisa from being relegated to the 2020 China League One.

== Name history ==
- 2006–2007 Hohhot Binhai F.C. 呼和浩特滨海
- 2008–2015 Tianjin Songjiang F.C. 天津松江
- 2015–2018 Tianjin Quanjian F.C. 天津权健
- 2019–2020 Tianjin Tianhai F.C. 天津天海

== Kit evolution ==
2006	2009	2016	2017

== Managerial history ==
- (China) Han Jinming (2007)
- (China) Zhang Xiaorui (2008–09)
- (China) Hao Haidong (caretaker) (2010)
- (Belgium) Patrick de Wilde (2010–11)
- (China) Hao Haitao (2012)
- (China) Pei Encai (2013)
- (China) Zhang Xiaorui (caretaker) (2013)
- (Italy) Gianni Bortoletto (2014)
- (Portugal) Manuel Cajuda (2014)
- (Croatia) Dražen Besek (2014–2015)
- (China) Sun Jianjun (caretaker) (2015)
- (Croatia) Goran Tomić (2015)
- (Brazil) Vanderlei Luxemburgo (2015–2016)
- (Italy) Fabio Cannavaro (2016–2017)
- (Portugal) Paulo Sousa (2017–2018)
- (China) Shen Xiangfu (caretaker) (2018)
- (South Korea) Park Choong-kyun (2018)
- (South Korea) Choi Kang-hee (2018–2019)
- (China) Shen Xiangfu (2019)
- (South Korea) Park Choong-kyun (2019)
- (China) Li Weifeng (2019)

== Honours ==
- China League One (tier-II)
  - Champions (1): 2016

== Results ==
=== All-time league rankings ===
- As of the end of 2019 season.

Year	Tier	Pld	W	D	L	GF	GA	GD	Pts	Pos	FA Cup	Super Cup	Asia	Att./G	Stadium
2007	3	14	4	6	4	19	19	0	18	5 ^{1}	NH	DNQ	DNQ		Hohhot People's Stadium
2008	3	18	12	2	4	36	14	22	29^{2}	5	NH	DNQ	DNQ		Hedong Sports Centre
2009	3	14	4	7	3	18	15	3	18^{2}	9	NH	DNQ	DNQ		Shuidi Outer Stadium
2010	3	19	11	5	3	32	12	20	35^{2}	RU	NH	DNQ	DNQ		Tianjin Olympic Center Stadium
2011	2	26	5	10	11	23	31	−8	25	12	R1	DNQ	DNQ		Tianjin Olympic Center Stadium
2012	2	30	12	9	9	27	24	3	45	6	R2	DNQ	DNQ	2,998	Tianjin Tuanbo Football Stadium
2013	2	30	8	11	11	31	36	−5	35	10	R3	DNQ	DNQ	2,247	Tianjin Tuanbo Football Stadium
2014	2	30	12	7	11	39	33	6	43	7	R3	DNQ	DNQ	2,511	Tianjin Tuanbo Football Stadium
2015	2	30	9	9	12	28	33	−5	36	9	R3	DNQ	DNQ	7,369	Tianjin Tuanbo Football Stadium
2016	2	30	18	5	7	61	27	34	59	W	QF	DNQ	DNQ	12,165	Haihe Educational Football Stadium
2017	1	30	15	9	6	46	33	13	54	3	QF	DNQ	DNQ	24,877	Haihe Educational Football Stadium
2018	1	30	9	9	12	41	48	−7	36	9	R16	DNQ	QF	19,695	Haihe Educational Football Stadium
2019	1	30	4	13	13	40	53	-13	25	14	QF	DNQ	DNQ	16,907	Tianjin Olympic Center Stadium

- ^Note 1: In North League ^Note 2: In group stage.

Key

- China top division
- China second division
- China third division
- Champions
- Runners-up
- Third place
- Relegated
- Pld = Played
- W = Games won
- D = Games drawn
- L = Games lost
- F = Goals for
- A = Goals against
- Pts = Points
- Pos = Final position
- DNQ = Did not qualify
- DNE = Did not enter
- NH = Not Held
- - = Does Not Exist
- R1 = Round 1
- R2 = Round 2
- R3 = Round 3
- R4 = Round 4
- F = Final
- SF = Semi-finals
- QF = Quarter-finals
- R16 = Round of 16
- Group = Group stage
- GS2 = Second Group stage
- QR1 = First Qualifying Round
- QR2 = Second Qualifying Round
- QR3 = Third Qualifying Round

=== Continental results ===
Season	Competition	Round	Opposition	Home	Away	Rank /Agg.
2018	AFC Champions League	Group stage	(Hong Kong) Kitchee	3–0	1–0	2nd
2018	AFC Champions League	Group stage	(Japan) Kashiwa Reysol	3–2	1–1	2nd
2018	AFC Champions League	Group stage	(South Korea) Jeonbuk Hyundai Motors	4–2	3–6	2nd
2018	AFC Champions League	Round of 16	(China) Guangzhou Evergrande	0–0	2–2	2–2 (a)
2018	AFC Champions League	Quarter-finals	(Japan) Kashima Antlers	0–3	0–2	0–5

== Notable players ==
Had international caps for their respective countries.

Europe
Belgium

- (Belgium) Axel Witsel (2017–2018)

Estonia

- (Estonia) Taavi Rähn (2011–2012)

Slovenia

- (Slovenia) Aleksandar Rodić (2011–2012)

South America
Brazil

- (Brazil) Jádson (2016)
- (Brazil) Luís Fabiano (2016)
- (Brazil) Alexandre Pato (2017–2019)

Asia
China

- (China) Zhang Xiaorui (2008)
- (China) Huang Yong (2009–2010)
- (China) Yang Jun (2015–2018)
- (China) Zhang Shuo (2015–2017)
- (China) Sun Ke (2016–2020)
- (China) Zhao Xuri (2016–2018)
- (China) Zhang Lu (2016–2020)

Hong Kong

- (Hong Kong) Ng Wai Chiu (2013–2016)
- (Hong Kong) Jean-Jacques Kilama (2016–2017)

South Korea

- (South Korea) Kwon Kyung-won (2017–2020)
