= 2018 Guangzhou Evergrande Taobao F.C. season =

Guangzhou Evergrande Taobao 2018
- Chairman: Gao Han
- Manager: Fabio Cannavaro
- Stadium: Tianhe Stadium
- Super League: 2nd
- FA Cup: Fifth Round
- FA Super Cup: Winners
- AFC Champions League: Round of 16
- Top goalscorer: League: Talisca (16 goals); All: Ricardo Goulart (21 goals)
- Highest home attendance: 49,967 vs Shanghai SIPG; 3 November 2018 (Super League)
- Lowest home attendance: 18,739 vs Guizhou Hengfeng; 2 May 2018 (FA Cup)
- Average home league attendance: league: 47,002 all: 43,934
Home colours	Away colours

The 2018 Guangzhou Evergrande Taobao season is the 65th year in Guangzhou Evergrande's existence and its 51st season in the Chinese football league, also its 29th season in the top flight. The club appointed Italian manager Fabio Cannavaro as manager for the second time on 9 November 2017 after Luiz Felipe Scolari refused to extend his contract. The chairman of the club was changed to Gao Han by owner Evergrande Group on the same day.

== Transfers ==
=== In ===
==== Winter ====
Squad number	Position	Player	Age	Moving from	Type	Transfer fee	Date	Source
17	FW	(China) Yang Liyu	20	(Portugal) Gondomar	Transfer	Undisclosed	24 December 2017	
22	MF	(China) Tang Shi	22	(China) Meizhou Hakka	Transfer	Undisclosed	24 December 2017	
23	DF	(China) Deng Hanwen	22	(China) Beijing Renhe	Transfer	Undisclosed	24 December 2017	
	MF	(China) Ju Feng	22	(Japan) Ehime FC	Loan return	-	25 December 2017	
	FW	(China) Shewket Yalqun	24	(China) Xinjiang Tianshan Leopard	Loan return	-	1 January 2018	
18	MF	(China) Guo Jing	20	(China) Meizhou Hakka	Loan return	-	1 January 2018	
	MF	(China) Xu Li'ao	22	(Bulgaria) OFC Pomorie	Loan return	-	1 January 2018	
	MF	(China) Zhang Jiaqi	26	(China) Shenzhen	Loan return	-	1 January 2018	
	DF	(China) Gong Liangxuan	24	(China) Chengdu Qbao	Loan return	-	1 January 2018	
	DF	(China) Han Pengfei	24	(China) Guizhou Hengfeng	Loan return	-	1 January 2018	
	DF	(China) Liu Haidong	22	(China) Heilongjiang Lava Spring	Loan return	-	1 January 2018	
	DF	(China) Liu Hao	21	(China) Guizhou Hengfeng	Loan return	-	1 January 2018	
	GK	(China) Liu Weiguo	25	(China) Yinchuan Helanshan	Loan return	-	1 January 2018	
40	GK	(China) Liu Shibo	20	(China) Nei Mongol Zhongyou	Loan return	-	1 January 2018	
30	DF	(China) Hu Ruibao	21	(Denmark) Vejle Boldklub	Transfer	Free	16 January 2018	
8	MF	(Serbia) Nemanja Gudelj	26	(China) Tianjin TEDA	Transfer	Undisclosed	28 January 2018	
33	MF	(China) Zhong Yihao	21	(China) Qingdao Jonoon	Transfer	Undisclosed	28 February 2018	
54	DF	(China) Lü Zheng	28	(China) Shenzhen	Transfer	Undisclosed	28 February 2018	

==== Summer ====
Squad number	Position	Player	Age	Moving from	Type	Transfer fee	Date	Source
24	MF	(Brazil) Talisca	24	(Portugal) Benfica	Loan	€ 5.8 millions	8 June 2018	
	DF	(China) Imran Kurban	19	(Czech Republic) FK Mohelnice	Loan return	-	30 June 2018	
	MF	(China) Zheng Jie	22	(France) AJ Auxerre	Loan return	-	30 June 2018	
9	MF	(Brazil) Paulinho	29	(Spain) Barcelona	Loan	€ 5.5 millions	8 July 2018	

=== Out ===
==== Winter ====
Squad number	Position	Player	Age	Moving to	Type	Transfer fee	Date	Source
30	FW	(Brazil) Muriqui	31	-	End of contract	-	30 November 2017	
17	DF	(China) Liu Jian	33	(China) Beijing Renhe	Transfer	Free (part of Deng Hanwen's transfer deal)	28 December 2017	
9	FW	(Colombia) Jackson Martínez	31	-	Released	-	31 January 2018	
48	MF	(China) Zheng Jie	22	(France) AJ Auxerre	Loan	Undisclosed	31 January 2018	
	DF	(China) Yang Zhaohui	19	(South Korea) Busan FC	Loan	Undisclosed	7 February 2018	
26	FW	(China) Wang Jingbin	22	(China) Shanghai Shenxin	Loan	Undisclosed	25 February 2018	
	MF	(China) Zhang Jiaqi	26	(China) Guangzhou R&F	Loan	Undisclosed	25 February 2018	
13	GK	(China) Fang Jingqi	25	(China) Meizhou Meixian Techand	Transfer	Undisclosed	28 February 2018	
	GK	(China) Fang Zihong	20	(China) Nei Mongol Zhongyou	Loan	Undisclosed	28 February 2018	
	DF	(China) Han Pengfei	24	(China) Guizhou Hengfeng	Transfer	Undisclosed	28 February 2018	
	MF	(China) Huang Yuanqiang	20	(China) Meizhou Meixian Techand	Transfer	Undisclosed	28 February 2018	
45	MF	(China) Li Geng	20	(China) Dalian Transcendence	Loan	Undisclosed	28 February 2018	
	DF	(China) Lin Jianwei	21	(China) Qingdao Huanghai	Transfer	Undisclosed	28 February 2018	
	DF	(China) Liu Hao	22	(China) Guizhou Hengfeng	Transfer	Undisclosed	28 February 2018	
	DF	(China) Liu Ruicheng	18	(China) Nei Mongol Zhongyou	Loan	Undisclosed	28 February 2018	
14	DF	(China) Rong Hao	30	(China) Shanghai Greenland Shenhua	Loan	Undisclosed	28 February 2018	
	MF	(China) Wu Xiaotian	20	(China) Shijiazhuang Ever Bright	Transfer	Undisclosed	28 February 2018	
	FW	(China) Xie Weijun	20	(China) Tianjin TEDA	Transfer	Undisclosed	28 February 2018	
	MF	(China) Hu Yangyang	22	(China) Hainan Boying	Transfer	Free	3 March 2018	
	DF	(China) Liu Haidong	23	(China) Hainan Boying	Transfer	Undisclosed	9 March 2018	
	MF	(China) Chen Zijie	21	(China) Yinchuan Helanshan	Loan	Undisclosed	10 March 2018	
52	DF	(China) Guan Haojin	22	(China) Yinchuan Helanshan	Loan	Undisclosed	10 March 2018	
53	FW	(China) Ye Guochen	21	(China) Yinchuan Helanshan	Loan	Undisclosed	10 March 2018	
18	MF	(China) Yang Xin	24	(China) Jiangxi Liansheng	Transfer	Undisclosed	11 March 2018	
	MF	(China) Luo Jiacheng	23	(China) Zhenjiang Huasa	Transfer	Undisclosed	13 March 2018	
	MF	(China) Gan Tiancheng	23	(China) Shenzhen Ledman	Transfer	Undisclosed	15 March 2018	
42	MF	(China) Wang Rui	24	(China) Shenzhen Ledman	Transfer	Undisclosed	15 March 2018	
47	DF	(China) Wu Yue	19	(China) Shenzhen Pengcheng	Transfer	Undisclosed	March 2018	
54	DF	(China) Zhou Wenxin	20	(China) Shenzhen Pengcheng	Transfer	Undisclosed	March 2018	
55	MF	(China) Guo Tao	19	(China) Shenzhen Pengcheng	Transfer	Undisclosed	March 2018	

==== Summer ====
Squad number	Position	Player	Age	Moving to	Type	Transfer fee	Date	Source
12	DF	(China) Wang Shangyuan	25	(China) Henan Jianye	Loan	Free	30 June 2018	
	MF	(China) Xu Li'ao	23	(China) Zibo Sunday	Loan	Undisclosed	July 2018	
	FW	(China) Zeng Qingshen	21	(Denmark) Vejle Boldklub	Transfer	Free	17 July 2018	
	MF	(China) Zhang Aokai	18	(Spain) Espanyol	Transfer	Undisclosed	19 July 2018	
	GK	(China) Zhao Tianci	23	(Japan) YSCC Yokohama	Transfer	Free	18 August 2018	
8	MF	(Serbia) Nemanja Gudelj	26	(Portugal) Sporting CP	Loan	Undisclosed	23 August 2018	

== Pre-season and friendlies ==
=== Training matches ===
Date	Opponents	H / A	Result	Scorers
2018-01-14	(Belgium) Eupen	N	0–2	/ Lotiès (17'), Leye (75')
2018-01-22	(Denmark) Brøndby IF	N	3–3	Alan (3', 37'), Yu Hanchao (7') / Wilczek (12'), Tibbling (20'), Mensah (66')
2018-02-03	(Denmark) FC Midtjylland	N	2–1	Alan (37'), Yang Liyu (84') / Kairinen (76')
2018-02-09	(South Korea) Gangwon FC	H	3–3	Goulart, Gao Lin, Zheng Long / Đerić (2), Kim Seung-yong
2018-06-23	(China) Jiangsu Suning	N	4–0	Alan (2), Huang Bowen, Gao Lin
2018-07-01	(Czech Republic) Fastav Zlín	N	1–1	Gao Lin (50'-pen.) / Železník (5')
2018-07-04	(Romania) Sepsi Sfântu Gheorghe	N	2–1	Alan (11', 20') / Hadnagy (86')
2018-07-07	(Russia) Orenburg	N	3–2	Yu Hanchao (60'), Gudelj (62'), Talisca (90+1') / Popović (8', 14'-pen.)

=== The Dubai International Cup 2018 ===
25 January 2018	Guangzhou Evergrande Taobao (China)	0–0	(Denmark) Copenhagen	Dubai
15:30 UTC+4		Report		Stadium: Maktoum bin Rashid Al Maktoum Stadium; Referee: Ali Hassan Kareem (United Arab Emirates)

28 January 2018	Guangzhou Evergrande Taobao (China)	1–4	(Russia) Zenit Saint Petersburg	Dubai
19:00 UTC+4	Gao Lin 86'	Report	Driussi 28'; Kokorin 30'; Zabolotny 57'; Terentyev 84'	Stadium: Maktoum bin Rashid Al Maktoum Stadium; Referee: Yahya Al Mulla (United Arab Emirates)

31 January 2018	Guangzhou Evergrande Taobao (China)	1–5	(Czech Republic) Slavia Prague	Dubai
19:00 UTC+4	Alan 84' (pen.)	Report	Bořil 2', 45'; Zmrhal 43'; Necid 51'; Souček 60'	Stadium: Maktoum bin Rashid Al Maktoum Stadium; Referee: Zayed Al Awlaqi (United Arab Emirates)

== Competitions ==
Win Draw Loss

=== Chinese Super League ===
==== Table ====
Pos	Team	Pld	W	D	L	GF	GA	GD	Pts	Qualification or relegation
1	Shanghai SIPG (C)	30	21	5	4	77	33	+44	68	Qualification to Champions League group stage
2	Guangzhou Evergrande Taobao	30	20	3	7	82	36	+46	63	Qualification to Champions League group stage
3	Shandong Luneng Taishan	30	17	7	6	57	39	+18	58	Qualification to Champions League play-off round
4	Beijing Sinobo Guoan (Note: Beijing Sinobo Guoan qualified for the 2019 AFC Champions League group stage as 2018 Chinese FA Cup winners.)	30	15	8	7	64	45	+19	53	Qualification to Champions League group stage
5	Jiangsu Suning	30	13	9	8	48	33	+15	48	

Source: League table
Rules for classification: 1) Points; 2) Head-to-head points; 3) Head-to-head goal difference; 4) Head-to-head goals scored; 5) Reserve league points; 6) U19 Elite league points; 7) Goal difference; 8) Goals scored; 9) Disciplinary points (1 point for each yellow card, 3 points for each red card); 10) Draw
(C) Champions

==== Results by round ====
Round	1	2	3	4	5	6	7	8	9	10	11	12	13	14	15	16	17	18	19	20	21	22	23	24	25	26	27	28	29	30
Ground	H	H	H	A	H	A	A	H	A	H	A	H	A	H	A	A	A	A	H	A	H	H	A	H	A	H	A	H	A	H
Result	L	W	W	W	W	D	D	W	L	D	L	W	L	W	W	W	L	W	W	W	W	W	W	W	W	W	W	L	L	W
Position	11	5	3	2	2	2	3	3	4	5	5	4	4	4	4	4	4	4	4	3	3	2	2	2	2	2	2	2	2	2

Updated to match(es) played on 11 November 2018. Source: Chinese Super League Table (in Chinese)
A = Away; H = Home; W = Win; D = Draw; L = Loss; P = Postponed

==== Results summary ====
Overall								Home						Away					
Pld	W	D	L	GF	GA	GD	Pts	W	D	L	GF	GA	GD	W	D	L	GF	GA	GD
30	20	3	7	82	36	+46	63	12	1	2	49	15	+34	8	2	5	33	21	+12

Last updated: 11 November 2018.
Source: Competitive Matches

==== Matches ====
2 March 2018 1	Guangzhou Evergrande Taobao	4–5	Guangzhou R&F	Guangzhou
19:35 UTC+8	Alan 13', 39', 45'; Huang Bowen (yellow card) 42'; Goulart 69' (pen.); Hu Ruibao (yellow card) 89'	Report	Zahavi 2', 10', 49'; Urso 65' (yellow card) 90+7'; Ding Haifeng (yellow card) 71'; Xiao Zhi 75'	Stadium: Tianhe Stadium; Attendance: 47,839; Referee: Fu Ming; Assistant referees: Zhang Cheng, Zhang Qiangjing; Fourth official: Ma Li

9 March 2018 2	Guangzhou Evergrande Taobao	5–0	Changchun Yatai	Guangzhou
19:35 UTC+8	Gao Lin 50'; Zhang Chenglin (yellow card) 54'; Goulart 60', 66'; Deng Hanwen (yellow card) 75'; Alan 80', 84'	Report	Jiang Zhe (yellow card) 31'; Zhang Li (yellow card) 37'	Stadium: Tianhe Stadium; Attendance: 47,693; Referee: Zhao Zhizhi; Assistant referees: Xu Xianghui, Yang Yang; Fourth official: Lin Jun

18 March 2018 3	Guangzhou Evergrande Taobao	1–0	Henan Jianye	Guangzhou
19:35 UTC+8	Goulart (penalty missed) 8' (pen.); Alan 27'	Report	Wu Yan (yellow card) 7'; Cala (yellow card) 85'	Stadium: Tianhe Stadium; Attendance: 48,241; Referee: Ma Ning; Assistant referees: Shi Xiang, Huang Tao; Fourth official: Zhang Long

30 March 2018 4	Tianjin Quanjian	0–1	Guangzhou Evergrande Taobao	Tianjin
19:35 UTC+8		Report	Goulart (penalty missed) 15' (pen.); Li Xuepeng (yellow card) 33'; Alan (red card) 51'; Gao Lin 55'; Zeng Cheng (yellow card) 76'; Zheng Zhi (yellow card) 90+2'; Yang Liyu (yellow card) 90+5'	Stadium: Haihe Educational Football Stadium; Attendance: 23,099; Referee: Shi Zhenlu; Assistant referees: Cao Yi, Yu Yue; Fourth official: Kou Jianxun

8 April 2018 5	Guangzhou Evergrande Taobao	1–0	Shandong Luneng Taishan	Guangzhou
19:35 UTC+8	Gao Lin 4' (yellow card) 89'; Li Xuepeng (yellow card) 40'; Yang Liyu (yellow card) 85'	Report	Dai Lin (yellow card) 11'; Liu Junshuai (yellow card) 86'	Stadium: Tianhe Stadium; Attendance: 47,942; Referee: Wang Zhe; Assistant referees: Huo Weiming, Yang Yang; Fourth official: Niu Minghui

13 April 2018 6	Shanghai Greenland Shenhua	2–2	Guangzhou Evergrande Taobao	Shanghai
18:00 UTC+8	Li Peng (yellow card) 41'; Bai Jiajun (yellow card) 45+1'; Zhu Jianrong 58'; Xu Yougang 72'	Report	Zou Zheng (yellow card) 19'; Goulart 66'; Gudelj 68' (yellow card) 79'; Yu Hanchao (yellow card) 77'	Stadium: Hongkou Football Stadium; Attendance: 22,303; Referee: Kim Dong-jin (South Korea); Assistant referees: Sun Kai, Liu Jinyu; Fourth official: Lin Jun

22 April 2018 7	Beijing Sinobo Guoan	2–2	Guangzhou Evergrande Taobao	Beijing
19:35 UTC+8	Augusto (yellow card) 17' (goal) 90' (pen.); Viera (yellow card) 20'; Wei Shihao (yellow card) 82'; Jiang Tao (yellow card) 83'; Bakambu 90+1'	Report	Deng Hanwen (yellow card) 9' (yellow-red card) 89'; Gudelj 68'; Yu Hanchao 73'; Gao Lin (yellow card) 79'	Stadium: Workers Stadium; Attendance: 56,211; Referee: Ma Ning; Assistant referees: Cao Yi, Shi Xiang; Fourth official: Wu Liying

28 April 2018 8	Guangzhou Evergrande Taobao	1–0	Jiangsu Suningyi Purchase	Guangzhou
19:35 UTC+8	Yu Hanchao 90+1' (yellow card) 90+1'	Report	Ji Xiang (yellow card) 84'; Tian Yinong (yellow card) 86'	Stadium: Tianhe Stadium; Attendance: 47,492; Referee: Marco Guida (Italy); Assistant referees: Ma Ji, Zhang Cheng; Fourth official: Jin Jingyuan

5 May 2018 9	Dalian Yifang	3–0	Guangzhou Evergrande Taobao	Dalian
15:00 UTC+8	Mushekwi 24'; Carrasco 43' (pen.); Yu Zhen (yellow card) 81'; Wang Jinxian 87'; Sun Bo (yellow card) 90+5'	Report	Tang Shi (yellow card) 40'	Stadium: Dalian Sports Center Stadium; Attendance: 41,096; Referee: Zhao Zhizhi; Assistant referees: Sun Kai, Hu Chengjun; Fourth official: Wang Zhe

12 May 2018 10	Guangzhou Evergrande Taobao	2–2	Hebei China Fortune	Guangzhou
19:35 UTC+8	Goulart 18', 62'; Zhang Linpeng (yellow card) 90+1'	Report	Lavezzi 24'; Hernanes (yellow card) 26' (goal) 32'; Luo Senwen (yellow card) 64'; Mascherano (yellow card) 67'	Stadium: Tianhe Stadium; Attendance: 47,751; Referee: Shi Zhenlu; Assistant referees: Yu Yue, Zhang Hongwei; Fourth official: He Xiaohu

20 May 2018 11	Beijing Renhe	2–0	Guangzhou Evergrande Taobao	Beijing
15:30 UTC+8	Moukandjo 9'; Fernández 15' (red card) 90+2'; Liu Jian (yellow card) 73'	Report	Zheng Zhi (yellow card) 45'; Yu Hanchao (yellow card) 90+2'	Stadium: Beijing Fengtai Stadium; Attendance: 19,387; Referee: Lin Jun; Assistant referees: Cao Yi, Ma Ji; Fourth official: Shen Yinhao

18 July 2018 12	Guangzhou Evergrande Taobao	4–0	Guizhou Hengfeng	Guangzhou
19:35 UTC+8	Gao Lin 8'; Talisca 29', 62', 79'; Zhong Yihao (red card) 90+2'	Report	Zheng Kaimu (yellow card) 58'	Stadium: Tianhe Stadium; Attendance: 47,982; Referee: Wang Zhe; Assistant referees: Sun Kai, Liu Jinyu; Fourth official: Zhang Long

29 July 2018 14	Guangzhou Evergrande Taobao	5–0	Chongqing SWM	Guangzhou
19:35 UTC+8	Deng Hanwen 2' (yellow card) 49'; Gao Lin 40'; Paulinho 64'; Talisca 70', 85'	Report	Peng Xinli (yellow card) 16'	Stadium: Tianhe Stadium; Attendance: 48,579; Referee: Wang Di; Assistant referees: Zhang Qiangjin, Deng Bo; Fourth official: Huang Yi

2 August 2018 15	Tianjin TEDA	0–3	Guangzhou Evergrande Taobao	Tianjin
19:35 UTC+8	Guo Hao (yellow card) 82'	Report	Li Xuepeng (yellow card) 22'; Paulinho 42', 44'; Talisca (yellow card) 74'; Goulart 90+1'; Zheng Long (yellow card) 90+2'	Stadium: Tianjin Olympic Center Stadium; Attendance: 15,837; Referee: Fu Ming; Assistant referees: Zhang Cheng, Zhang Hongwei; Fourth official: Kou Jianxun

5 August 2018 16	Guangzhou R&F	2–4	Guangzhou Evergrande Taobao	Guangzhou
19:35 UTC+8	Renatinho 24'; Zahavi (yellow card) 80' (goal) 90+1' (pen.)	Report	Talisca 27'; Mei Fang (yellow card) 37'; Paulinho 48', 88'; Zhang Linpeng (yellow card) 58'; Zheng Zhi (yellow card) 61'; Goulart 65' (yellow card) 68'	Stadium: Yuexiushan Stadium; Attendance: 12,996; Referee: Ma Ning; Assistant referees: Cao Yi, Yu Yue; Fourth official: Xia Jun

11 August 2018 17	Changchun Yatai	3–2	Guangzhou Evergrande Taobao	Changchun
18:00 UTC+8	Yu Rui 17'; Tan Long (yellow card) 71' (goal) 84', 90'; Pejčinović (yellow card) 89'	Report	Yang Liyu 28'; Mei Fang (yellow card) 30'; Goulart 43'; Feng Xiaoting (yellow card) 79'	Stadium: Changchun Stadium; Attendance: 27,682; Referee: Shen Yinhao; Assistant referees: Zhou Fei, Xi Fei; Fourth official: Huang Yi

15 August 2018 18	Henan Jianye	0–5	Guangzhou Evergrande Taobao	Zhengzhou
20:00 UTC+8	Vaz Tê (yellow card) 31'; Gu Cao (yellow card) 70'	Report	Feng Xiaoting (yellow card) 26'; Talisca 29'; Mei Fang (yellow card) 52'; Gao Lin 58', 90+1'; Goulart 65', 85'	Stadium: Hanghai Stadium; Attendance: 21,899; Referee: Fu Ming; Assistant referees: Ma Ji, Shen Pengxiang; Fourth official: He Xiaohu

19 August 2018 19	Guangzhou Evergrande Taobao	5–0	Tianjin Quanjian	Guangzhou
19:35 UTC+8	Paulinho 15', 57'; Huang Bowen (yellow card) 29'; Goulart 52'; Talisca 74', 90'; Zhang Chenglin (yellow card) 80'	Report	Sun Ke (yellow card) 42'; Liu Yue (yellow card) 82'; Wang Xiaolong (yellow card) 84'	Stadium: Tianhe Stadium; Attendance: 48,527; Referee: Shen Yinhao; Assistant referees: Cao Yi, Yi Xueyun; Fourth official: Ma Li

25 August 2018 20	Shandong Luneng Taishan	1–4	Guangzhou Evergrande Taobao	Jinan
19:35 UTC+8	Dai Lin (yellow card) 35'; Pellè 73'		Talisca 6', 42'; Gao Lin (yellow card) 41'; Goulart 58'; Mei Fang (yellow card) 63'; Zheng Zhi (yellow card) 63'; Paulinho 74'	Stadium: Jinan Olympic Sports Center Stadium; Attendance: 42,035; Referee: Kim Hee-gon (South Korea); Assistant referees: Zhang Cheng, Liu Jinyu; Fourth official: Guan Xing

2 September 2018 21	Guangzhou Evergrande Taobao	2–1	Shanghai Greenland Shenhua	Guangzhou
19:35 UTC+8	Yu Hanchao (yellow card) 22'; Talisca (yellow card) 43'; Li Xuepeng (yellow card) 52'; Gao Lin 58'; Yang Liyu 90+1' (yellow card) 90+1'		Moreno (yellow card) 24'; Guarín 53' (pen.); Li Peng (yellow card) 76'; Li Shuai (yellow card) 77'	Stadium: Tianhe Stadium; Attendance: 46,793; Referee: Ravshan Irmatov (Uzbekistan); Assistant referees: Abdukhamidullo Rasulov (Uzbekistan), Sanjar Shoyusupov (Uzbekistan); Fourth official: Jin Jingyuan

14 September 2018 22	Guangzhou Evergrande Taobao	1–0	Beijing Sinobo Guoan	Guangzhou
19:35 UTC+8	Zhang Linpeng (yellow card) 7'; Zheng Zhi (yellow card) 51'; Paulinho (yellow card) 61'; Feng Xiaoting (yellow card) 81'; Talisca 90+1' (yellow card) 90+6'; Zeng Cheng (yellow card) 90+5'		Bakambu (yellow card) 41'; Viera (yellow card) 54'; Augusto (penalty missed) 61' (pen.) (yellow card) 73'	Stadium: Tianhe Stadium; Attendance: 49,736; Referee: Kim Dae-yong (South Korea); Assistant referees: Cao Yi, Song Xiangyun; Fourth official: Tang Shunqi

18 September 2018 (Note: Match was postponed from 21 July to 18 September due to the arrival of Severe Tropical Storm Ampil.) 13	Shanghai SIPG	2–1	Guangzhou Evergrande Taobao	Shanghai
19:35 UTC+8	Wu Lei 1'; Elkeson 72'; Wang Shenchao (yellow card) 85'; Yan Junling (yellow card) 90+2'	Report	Gao Lin (yellow card) 39'; Paulinho 56'; Yang Liyu (yellow card) 80'; Huang Bowen (yellow card) 87'	Stadium: Shanghai Stadium; Attendance: 25,139; Referee: Viktor Kassai (Hungary); Assistant referees: György Ring (Hungary), Vencel Tóth (Hungary); Fourth official: Wang Jing

22 September 2018 23	Jiangsu Suningyi Purchase	2–3	Guangzhou Evergrande Taobao	Nanjing
19:35 UTC+8	Éder 1'; Li Ang 8'; Gu Chao (yellow card) 39'; Gao Tianyi (yellow card) 57'; Wu Xi (yellow card) 61'; Tian Yinong (yellow card) 68'		Mei Fang (yellow card) 7'; Zheng Zhi (yellow card) 61'; Paulinho 63'; Talisca 73', 79'; Yu Hanchao (yellow card) 88'	Stadium: Nanjing Olympic Sports Centre; Attendance: 50,973; Referee: Chae Sang-hyeop (South Korea); Assistant referees: Song Xiangyun, Sun Kai; Fourth official: Lin Jun

29 September 2018 24	Guangzhou Evergrande Taobao	3–0	Dalian Yifang	Guangzhou
19:35 UTC+8	Alan 5' (pen.); Gao Lin 65'; Feng Xiaoting 69'			Stadium: Tianhe Stadium; Attendance: 46,392; Referee: Shi Zhenlu; Assistant referees: Cao Yi, Liu Jinyu; Fourth official: Wang Jing

6 October 2018 25	Hebei China Fortune	0–3	Guangzhou Evergrande Taobao	Langfang
19:35 UTC+8	Jin Yangyang (yellow card) 90+4'		Gao Lin 2'; Zeng Cheng (yellow card) 28'; Deng Hanwen (yellow card) 36'; Alan 59'; Yu Hanchao 62'; Talisca (yellow card) 86'; Feng Xiaoting (yellow card) 90+1'	Stadium: Langfang Stadium; Attendance: 22,346; Referee: Zhang Lei; Assistant referees: Huo Weiming, Yi Xueyun; Fourth official: Huang Yi

20 October 2018 26	Guangzhou Evergrande Taobao	6–1	Beijing Renhe	Guangzhou
19:35 UTC+8	Zheng Long 5', 63'; Rao Weihui 18' (o.g.); Yu Hanchao 59'; Paulinho 69'; Alan (penalty missed) 78' (pen.) 80'; Zhang Linpeng (yellow card) 89'; Huang Bowen (yellow card) 90+4'		Luo Xin (yellow card) 36'; Rao Weihui (yellow card) 71'; Wan Houliang (yellow card) 77'; Moukandjo (penalty missed) 89' (pen.); Wan Houliang 90'	Stadium: Tianhe Stadium; Attendance: 47,295; Referee: Matthew Conger (New Zealand); Assistant referees: Cao Yi, Shen Pengxiang; Fourth official: Tang Shunqi

28 October 2018 27	Guizhou Hengfeng	0–3	Guangzhou Evergrande Taobao	Guiyang
15:30 UTC+8			Zhang Chenglin 36'; Deng Hanwen (yellow card) 39'; Yu Hanchao 52'; Alan (yellow card) 62'; Talisca 73'	Stadium: Guiyang Olympic Sports Center; Attendance: 18,939; Referee: Ma Ning; Assistant referees: Huo Weiming, Huang Tao; Fourth official: Huang Yi

3 November 2018 28	Guangzhou Evergrande Taobao	4–5	Shanghai SIPG	Guangzhou
19:35 UTC+8	Paulinho 30', 45+3'; Alan 43', 90+4' (pen.); Zhang Chenglin (yellow card) 45'; Zheng Zhi (yellow card) 48'; Talisca (yellow card) 78'; Gao Lin (yellow card) 88'		Lü Wenjun 14'; Cai Huikang (yellow card) 32', (goal) 40'; Wu Lei 50'; Zhang Chenglin 79' (o.g.); Hulk 89' (pen.); Ahmedov (yellow card) 90+3'	Stadium: Tianhe Stadium; Attendance: 49,967; Referee: Bastian Dankert (Germany); Assistant referees: René Rohde (Germany), Song Xiangyun; Fourth official: Ma Li

7 November 2018 29	Chongqing SWM	2–0	Guangzhou Evergrande Taobao	Chongqing
19:35 UTC+8	Sebá 31'; Kardec (yellow card) 34'; Li Fang (yellow card) 48'; Peng Xinli (yellow card) 68'; Sui Weijie (yellow card) 71'; Fernandinho 84'		Feng Xiaoting (yellow card) 34' (yellow-red card) 80'; Zheng Long (yellow card) 45'; Xu Xin (yellow card) 52'; Alan (yellow card) 75'	Stadium: Chongqing Olympic Sports Center; Attendance: 33,680; Referee: Pavel Královec (Czech Republic); Assistant referees: Ma Ji, Liu Jinyu; Fourth official: Liu Wei

11 November 2018 30	Guangzhou Evergrande Taobao	5–1	Tianjin TEDA	Guangzhou
15:00 UTC+8	Talisca 38'; Deng Hanwen (red card) 45+1'; Zhang Linpeng (yellow card) 47'; Alan 56', 80'; Zheng Long 84'; Wang Jinze 90+2'		Johnathan 7'; Cao Yang (yellow card) 70'; Guo Hao (yellow card) 84'	Stadium: Tianhe Stadium; Attendance: 32,796; Referee: Jarred Gillett (Australia); Assistant referees: Ashley Beecham (Australia), Anton Shchetinin (Australia); Fourth official: Ma Li

=== Chinese FA Cup ===
25 April 2018 Fourth round	Ningxia Mountain & Sea	0–1	Guangzhou Evergrande Taobao	Yinchuan
19:35 UTC+8			Zhang Wenzhao 26'; Feng Boxuan (yellow card) 42'	Stadium: Helan Mountain Stadium; Attendance: 26,723; Referee: Zhang Xiaochen; Assistant referees: Meng Xiangkun, Wang Wei; Fourth official: Ning Zhaobing

2 May 2018 Fifth round	Guangzhou Evergrande Taobao	2–2 (1–4 p)	Guizhou Hengfeng	Guangzhou
19:50 UTC+8 (Note: Match was postponed from 19:35 to 19:50 due to thunderstorm.)	Tang Shi 23'; Zhang Chenglin (yellow card) 45'; Alan 54' (pen.); Yang Liyu (yellow card) 56'; Hu Ruibao (yellow card) 70'		Jiang Liang (yellow card) 3'; Li Yingjian (yellow card) 22'; Zheng Kaimu 42'; Liang Xueming (penalty missed) 71' (pen.); Liang Xueming 87'; Liang Xueming (yellow card) 87'	Stadium: Tianhe Stadium; Attendance: 18,739; Referee: Guan Xing; Assistant referees: Huo Weiming, Xu Xianghui; Fourth official: Niu Minghui
	Penalties
	Alan (penalty missed); Deng Yubiao (penalty scored); Deng Hanwen (penalty missed)		(penalty scored) Chery; (penalty scored) Li Yingjian; (penalty scored) Min Junlin; (penalty scored) Zhu Zhengyu

=== Chinese FA Super Cup ===
26 February 2018	Guangzhou Evergrande Taobao	4–1	Shanghai Greenland Shenhua	Shanghai
19:35 UTC+8	Deng Hanwen (yellow card) 23'; Huang Bowen 26'; Alan 43'; Yu Hanchao (yellow card) 45'; Gao Lin 65'; Goulart (yellow card) 85'; Goulart 90+2' (pen.)		Guarín 36'; Li Yunqiu (yellow card) 47'	Stadium: Hongkou Football Stadium; Attendance: 23,998; Referee: Fu Ming; Assistant referees: Huo Weiming, Cao Yi; Fourth official: Guan Xing

=== AFC Champions League ===
==== Group stage ====
Pos	Team	Pld	W	D	L	GF	GA	GD	Pts	Qualification
1	(China) Guangzhou Evergrande	6	3	3	0	12	6	+6	12	Advance to knockout stage
2	(Thailand) Buriram United	6	2	3	1	7	6	+1	9	Advance to knockout stage
3	(Japan) Cerezo Osaka	6	2	2	2	6	8	−2	8	
4	(South Korea) Jeju United	6	1	0	5	6	11	−5	3	

Source: AFC
Rules for classification: Group stage tiebreakers

14 February 2018 1	Guangzhou Evergrande (China)	1–1	(Thailand) Buriram United	Guangzhou, China
17:00 UTC+8	Goulart 16'; Liao Lisheng (yellow card) 63'; Wang Shangyuan (yellow card) 88'	Report	Edgar 57'; Diogo (yellow card) 77'; Pravinwat (yellow card) 90+3'	Stadium: Tianhe Stadium; Attendance: 28,893; Referee: Ravshan Irmatov (Uzbekistan)

21 February 2018 2	Cerezo Osaka (Japan)	0–0	(China) Guangzhou Evergrande	Osaka, Japan
19:00 UTC+9	Yamashita (yellow card) 52'	Report	Goulart (yellow card) 35'; Gao Lin (yellow card) 52'; Liao Lisheng (yellow card) 65'	Stadium: Yanmar Stadium Nagai; Attendance: 9,885; Referee: Ammar Al-Jeneibi (United Arab Emirates)

6 March 2018 3	Guangzhou Evergrande (China)	5–3	(South Korea) Jeju United	Guangzhou, China
20:00 UTC+8	Zheng Zhi (yellow card) 34'; Alan 45+4'; Goulart 52'; Goulart 57' (pen.); Gudelj (yellow card) 60'; Goulart 86'; Wang Shangyuan (yellow card) 90'; Goulart 90+2'	Report	Jin Seong-wook 20'; Cruz 29'; Kim Won-il (yellow card) 62'; Jin Seong-wook (yellow card) 90+1'; Lee Chan-dong (yellow card) 90+2'; Lee Chang-min 90+3'	Stadium: Tianhe Stadium; Attendance: 37,693; Referee: Peter Green (Australia)

14 March 2018 4	Jeju United (South Korea)	0–2	(China) Guangzhou Evergrande	Seogwipo, South Korea
19:00 UTC+9	Lee Dong-soo (yellow card) 47'; Kim Won-il (yellow card) 75'; Kim Won-il (yellow card) 90+4' (yellow-red card)	Report	Gudelj 27'; Alan 37'; Gao Lin (yellow card) 61'; Gudelj (yellow card) 83'	Stadium: Jeju World Cup Stadium; Attendance: 4,035; Referee: Muhammad Taqi (Singapore)

3 April 2018 5	Buriram United (Thailand)	1–1	(China) Guangzhou Evergrande	Buriram, Thailand
18:00 UTC+7	Yoo Jun-soo 90+2'	Report	Zheng Long 20'; Zheng Zhi (yellow card) 32'; Huang Bowen (yellow card) 51'	Stadium: Chang Arena; Attendance: 10,533; Referee: Mohammed Abdulla Hassan Mohamed (United Arab Emirates)

17 April 2018 6	Guangzhou Evergrande (China)	3–1	(Japan) Cerezo Osaka	Guangzhou, China
19:00 UTC+8	Huang Bowen 6'; Alan 57'; Alan 86'	Report	Fukumitsu 10'; Funaki (yellow card) 36'; Sakemoto (yellow card) 50'	Stadium: Tianhe Stadium; Attendance: 39,692; Referee: Nawaf Shukralla (Bahrain)

==== Knockout stage ====
===== Round of 16 =====
8 May 2018 First leg	Tianjin Quanjian (China)	0–0	(China) Guangzhou Evergrande	Tianjin, China
19:30 UTC+8	Modeste (yellow card) 13'; Mi Haolun (yellow card) 39'; Liu Yiming (yellow card) 52'; Wang Jie (yellow card) 65'	Report	Kim Young-gwon (yellow card) 50'; Yu Hanchao (yellow card) 64'	Stadium: Tianjin Olympic Center Stadium; Attendance: 23,508; Referee: Valentin Kovalenko (Uzbekistan)

15 May 2018 Second leg	Guangzhou Evergrande (China)	2–2	(China) Tianjin Quanjian	Guangzhou, China
20:00 UTC+8	Goulart 17'; Zheng Zhi (yellow card) 27'; Zhang Linpeng (yellow card) 45+1'; Goulart 48'; Huang Bowen (yellow card) 51'	Report	Pato 19'; Wang Jie 52'; Zhang Cheng (yellow card) 60'	Stadium: Tianhe Stadium; Attendance: 48,632; Referee: Abdulrahman Al-Jassim (Qatar)

2–2 on aggregate. Guangzhou lost on away goals.

== Statistics ==
As of 11 November 2018

=== Appearances and goals ===
No.	Pos.	Player	Super League			FA Cup			Champions League			Super Cup			Total		
No.	Pos.	Player	Apps.	Starts	Goals	Apps.	Starts	Goals	Apps.	Starts	Goals	Apps.	Starts	Goals	Apps.	Starts	Goals
2	MF	(China) Liao Lisheng	11	3	0	0	0	0	5	2	0	0	0	0	16	5	0
3	DF	(China) Mei Fang	10	10	0	0	0	0	0	0	0	0	0	0	10	10	0
4	MF	(China) Xu Xin	7	1	0	2	2	0	1	0	0	1	0	0	11	3	0
5	DF	(China) Zhang Linpeng	26	26	0	0	0	0	8	8	0	1	1	0	35	35	0
6	DF	(China) Feng Xiaoting	26	26	1	0	0	0	7	6	0	1	1	0	34	33	1
7	FW	(Brazil) Alan Carvalho	12	11	13	1	1	1	8	8	4	1	1	1	22	21	19
8	MF	(Serbia) Nemanja Gudelj	11	11	2	0	0	0	6	6	1	1	1	0	18	18	3
9	MF	(Brazil) Paulinho	19	19	13	0	0	0	0	0	0	0	0	0	19	19	13
10	MF	(China) Zheng Zhi	17	17	0	0	0	0	4	4	0	0	0	0	21	21	0
11	MF	(Brazil) Ricardo Goulart	19	19	13	0	0	0	8	8	7	1	1	1	28	28	21
12	DF	(China) Wang Shangyuan	1	0	0	2	2	0	3	0	0	0	0	0	6	2	0
15	MF	(China) Zhang Wenzhao	9	4	0	2	2	1	4	0	0	0	0	0	15	6	1
16	MF	(China) Huang Bowen	20	12	0	0	0	0	7	5	1	1	1	1	28	18	2
17	FW	(China) Yang Liyu	18	6	2	2	2	0	2	0	0	1	0	0	23	8	2
19	GK	(China) Zeng Cheng	27	27	0	0	0	0	6	6	0	0	0	0	33	33	0
20	MF	(China) Yu Hanchao	26	24	5	0	0	0	8	5	0	1	1	0	35	30	5
21	DF	(China) Zhang Chenglin	11	6	1	2	2	0	1	1	0	0	0	0	14	9	1
22	MF	(China) Tang Shi	5	2	0	2	2	1	0	0	0	0	0	0	7	4	1
23	DF	(China) Deng Hanwen	21	17	1	2	0	0	1	1	0	1	1	0	25	19	1
24	MF	(Brazil) Talisca	18	18	16	0	0	0	0	0	0	0	0	0	18	18	16
25	DF	(China) Zou Zheng	8	4	0	2	2	0	0	0	0	0	0	0	10	6	0
27	MF	(China) Zheng Long	12	5	3	1	0	0	5	3	1	0	0	0	18	8	4
28	DF	(South Korea) Kim Young-gwon	5	5	0	0	0	0	8	8	0	0	0	0	13	13	0
29	FW	(China) Gao Lin	28	22	10	0	0	0	7	7	0	1	1	1	36	30	11
30	DF	(China) Hu Ruibao	1	0	0	2	2	0	0	0	0	0	0	0	3	2	0
32	GK	(China) Liu Dianzuo	3	3	0	2	2	0	2	2	0	1	1	0	8	8	0
33	MF	(China) Zhong Yihao	9	5	0	2	1	0	0	0	0	0	0	0	11	6	0
34	MF	(China) Feng Boxuan	6	1	0	2	2	0	0	0	0	1	0	0	9	3	0
35	DF	(China) Li Xuepeng	27	26	0	0	0	0	8	8	0	1	1	0	36	35	0
36	MF	(China) Deng Yubiao	4	0	0	2	0	0	0	0	0	0	0	0	6	0	0
58	FW	(China) Wang Jinze	1	0	1	0	0	0	0	0	0	0	0	0	1	0	1
TOTALS					81			3			14			4			102

=== Goalscorers ===
Rank	Player	No.	Pos.	Super League	FA Cup	Champions League	Super Cup	Total
1	(Brazil) Ricardo Goulart	11	MF	13	0	7	1	21
2	(Brazil) Alan Carvalho	7	FW	13	1	4	1	19
3	(Brazil) Talisca	24	MF	16	0	0	0	16
4	(Brazil) Paulinho	9	MF	13	0	0	0	13
5	(China) Gao Lin	29	FW	10	0	0	1	11
6	(China) Yu Hanchao	20	MF	5	0	0	0	5
7	(China) Zheng Long	27	MF	3	0	1	0	4
8	(Serbia) Nemanja Gudelj	8	MF	2	0	1	0	3
9	(China) Huang Bowen	16	MF	0	0	1	1	2
9	(China) Yang Liyu	17	FW	2	0	0	0	2
11	(China) Feng Xiaoting	6	DF	1	0	0	0	1
11	(China) Zhang Wenzhao	15	MF	0	1	0	0	1
11	(China) Zhang Chenglin	21	DF	1	0	0	0	1
11	(China) Tang Shi	22	MF	0	1	0	0	1
11	(China) Deng Hanwen	23	DF	1	0	0	0	1
11	(China) Wang Jinze	58	FW	1	0	0	0	1
TOTALS				81	3	14	4	102

=== Disciplinary record ===
No.	Pos.	Player	Super League			FA Cup			Champions League			Super Cup			Total		
No.	Pos.	Player	Booked	(yellow card) (yellow-red card)	Sent off (straight red)	Booked	(yellow card) (yellow-red card)	Sent off (straight red)	Booked	(yellow card) (yellow-red card)	Sent off (straight red)	Booked	(yellow card) (yellow-red card)	Sent off (straight red)	Booked	(yellow card) (yellow-red card)	Sent off (straight red)
2	MF	(China) Liao Lisheng	0	0	0	0	0	0	2	0	0	0	0	0	2	0	0
3	DF	(China) Mei Fang	5	0	0	0	0	0	0	0	0	0	0	0	5	0	0
4	MF	(China) Xu Xin	1	0	0	0	0	0	0	0	0	0	0	0	1	0	0
5	DF	(China) Zhang Linpeng	5	0	0	0	0	0	1	0	0	0	0	0	6	0	0
6	DF	(China) Feng Xiaoting	4	1	0	0	0	0	0	0	0	0	0	0	4	1	0
7	FW	(Brazil) Alan Carvalho	2	0	1	0	0	0	0	0	0	0	0	0	2	0	1
8	MF	(Serbia) Nemanja Gudelj	1	0	0	0	0	0	2	0	0	0	0	0	3	0	0
9	MF	(Brazil) Paulinho	1	0	0	0	0	0	0	0	0	0	0	0	1	0	0
10	MF	(China) Zheng Zhi	7	0	0	0	0	0	3	0	0	0	0	0	10	0	0
11	MF	(Brazil) Ricardo Goulart	1	0	0	0	0	0	1	0	0	1	0	0	3	0	0
12	DF	(China) Wang Shangyuan	0	0	0	0	0	0	2	0	0	0	0	0	2	0	0
16	MF	(China) Huang Bowen	4	0	0	0	0	0	2	0	0	0	0	0	6	0	0
17	FW	(China) Yang Liyu	4	0	0	1	0	0	0	0	0	0	0	0	5	0	0
19	GK	(China) Zeng Cheng	3	0	0	0	0	0	0	0	0	0	0	0	3	0	0
20	MF	(China) Yu Hanchao	5	0	0	0	0	0	1	0	0	1	0	0	7	0	0
21	DF	(China) Zhang Chenglin	3	0	0	1	0	0	0	0	0	0	0	0	4	0	0
22	MF	(China) Tang Shi	1	0	0	0	0	0	0	0	0	0	0	0	1	0	0
23	DF	(China) Deng Hanwen	4	1	1	0	0	0	0	0	0	1	0	0	5	1	1
24	MF	(Brazil) Talisca	5	0	0	0	0	0	0	0	0	0	0	0	5	0	0
25	DF	(China) Zou Zheng	1	0	0	0	0	0	0	0	0	0	0	0	1	0	0
27	MF	(China) Zheng Long	2	0	0	0	0	0	0	0	0	0	0	0	2	0	0
28	DF	(South Korea) Kim Young-gwon	0	0	0	0	0	0	1	0	0	0	0	0	1	0	0
29	FW	(China) Gao Lin	5	0	0	0	0	0	2	0	0	0	0	0	7	0	0
30	DF	(China) Hu Ruibao	1	0	0	1	0	0	0	0	0	0	0	0	2	0	0
33	MF	(China) Zhong Yihao	0	0	1	0	0	0	0	0	0	0	0	0	0	0	1
34	MF	(China) Feng Boxuan	0	0	0	1	0	0	0	0	0	0	0	0	1	0	0
35	DF	(China) Li Xuepeng	4	0	0	0	0	0	0	0	0	0	0	0	4	0	0
TOTALS			69	2	3	4	0	0	17	0	0	3	0	0	93	2	3
