= Hu Ruibao =

Chinese footballer

Hu Ruibao 胡睿宝
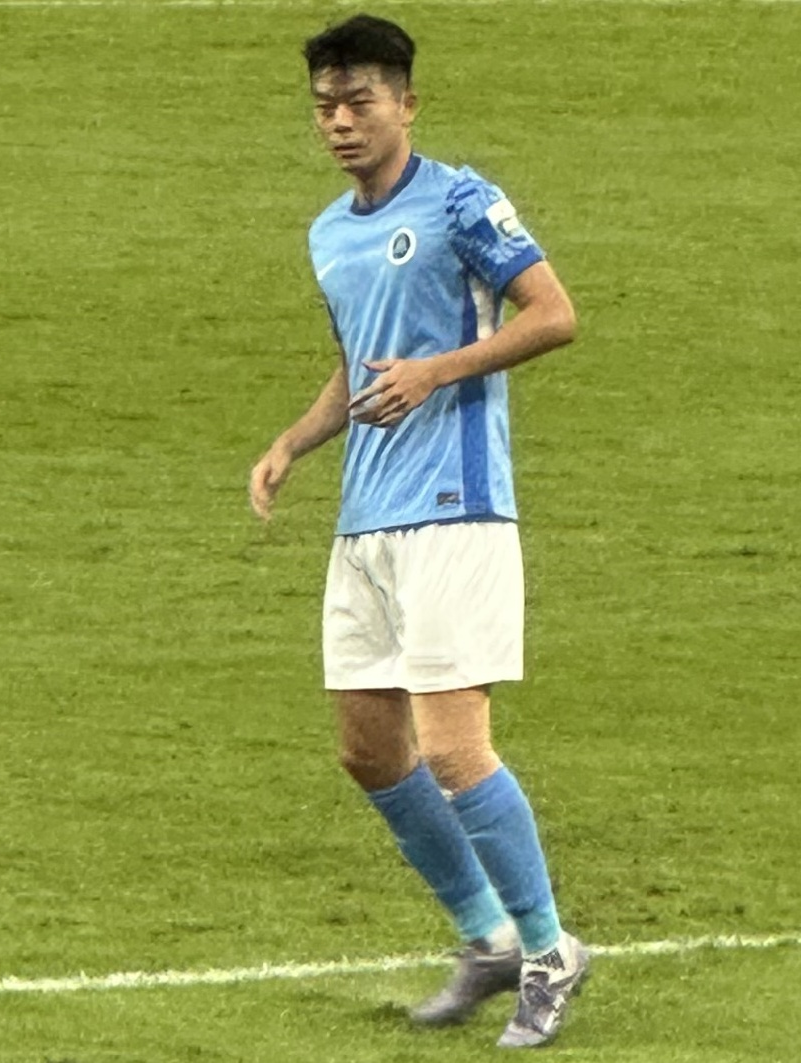
- Hu Ruibao in April 2025

Personal information
- Full name: Hu Ruibao
- Date of birth: 17 October 1996 (age 30)
- Place of birth: Baoji, Shaanxi, China
- Height: 1.86 m (6 ft 1 in)
- Positions: Centre-back; left-back

Team information
- Current team: Yunnan Yukun (on loan from Shenzhen Peng City)
- Number: 2

Youth career
- 2008–2013: Shanghai Luckystar
- 2013–2016: Guangzhou Evergrande

Senior career*
Years	Team	Apps	(Gls)
2016–2017	Guangzhou Evergrande	0	(0)
2017–2018	Vejle Boldklub	0	(0)
2017–2018	→ Darmstadt 98 (loan)	0	(0)
2018–2020	Guangzhou Evergrande	1	(0)
2019	→ Henan Jianye (loan)	10	(0)
2021	Guangzhou City	14	(0)
2022–2024	Chengdu Rongcheng	57	(4)
2024–	Shenzhen Peng City	44	(1)
2026–	→ Yunnan Yukun (loan)	6	(0)

International career^{‡}
2017–2018	China U23	6	(0)
- * Club domestic league appearances and goals as of 19 November 2026 ‡ National team caps and goals as of 5 August 2018

Hu Ruibao (Chinese: 胡睿宝; pinyin: Hú Ruìbǎo; born 17 October 1996) is a Chinese footballer who currently plays for Yunnan Yukun, on loan from Shenzhen Peng City in the Chinese Super League.

== Club career ==
Hu Ruibao joined Shanghai Luckystar football academy in 2008 and transferred to Chinese Super League side Guangzhou Evergrande in December 2013. On 2 April 2015, he received a ban of three months by the Chinese Football Association for age falsification which he used a fake ID Hu Bao (Chinese: 胡宝; born 5 January 1998) to register in the youth league between 2008 and 2014. Hu was promoted to Guangzhou Evergrande's first team squad by Luiz Felipe Scolari in the summer of 2016. He played as an unused substitute for five times in the 2016 season.

In November 2016, Hu received trial with Premier League side Manchester City. Guangzhou Evergrande refused Hu moving aboard and declared that he was under contract with the club, while Hu and his agent retorted that Guangzhou must let Hu join European Top-5 League clubs free according to the contract. Hu claimed that his trial at Manchester City was successful, he would strive for a regular starter of Manchester City in five years. Hu joined Danish club Vejle Boldklub in February 2017. Guangzhou submitted a claim to FIFA Dispute Resolution Chamber (DRC) for the ownership of Hu Ruibao on 27 February 2017. Hu received an interim transfer certificate to join Vejle Boldklub in March 2017.

Hu was loaned to 2. Bundesliga side Darmstadt 98, who newly relegated from Bundesliga, for one season on 7 August 2017. Without playing any competitive match for the club, he was linked with Chinese Super League club Tianjin TEDA in December 2017. On 3 January 2018, Darmstadt 98 officially terminated his loan deal in advance.

Hu returned to Guangzhou Evergrande in January 2018. On 2 March 2018, he made his senior debut in a 5–4 home defeat against city rival Guangzhou R&F, coming on as a substitute for Deng Hanwen in the half time. To gain more playing time he would go on to be loaned out to fellow top tier club Henan Jianye on 8 July 2019. He would go on to make his debut for them in a league game on 16 July 2019 against Shanghai Shenhua in a 3-2 defeat. On his return to Guangzhou he would struggle to establish himself within the team and after being dropped to the reserves he was allowed to join top tier club Guangzhou City on 14 March 2021 on a one-year contract.

On 26 April 2022, Hu joined newly promoted club Chengdu Rongcheng for the start of the 2022 Chinese Super League season. He would go on to make his debut in a league game on 8 June 2022 against Beijing Guoan in a 3-2 defeat. This was followed by his first goal, which was in a league game on 26 June 2022 against Shenzhen in a 2-2 draw.

On 16 July 2026, Hu was loan out to Chinese Super League side Yunnan Yukun for the rest of 2026 season.

== Career statistics ==
As of match played 31 October 2025.

Appearances and goals by club, season and competition
Club	Season	League			National Cup		Continental		Other		Total	
Club	Season	Division	Apps	Goals	Apps	Goals	Apps	Goals	Apps	Goals	Apps	Goals
Guangzhou Evergrande Taobao	2016	Chinese Super League	0	0	0	0	0	0	–		0	0
Vejle Boldklub	2016–17	Danish 1st Division	0	0	0	0	–		–		0	0
SV Darmstadt 98 (loan)	2017–18	2. Bundesliga	0	0	0	0	–		–		0	0
Guangzhou Evergrande Taobao	2018	Chinese Super League	1	0	2	0	0	0	0 (Note: Appearances in Chinese FA Super Cup)	0	3	0
Guangzhou Evergrande Taobao	2019	Chinese Super League	0	0	1	0	1	0	–		2	0
Guangzhou Evergrande Taobao	Total		1	0	3	0	1	0	0	0	5	0
Henan Jianye (loan)	2019	Chinese Super League	10	0	0	0	–		–		10	0
Guangzhou City	2021	Chinese Super League	14	0	0	0	–		–		14	0
Chengdu Rongcheng	2022	Chinese Super League	25	2	0	0	–		–		25	2
Chengdu Rongcheng	2023	Chinese Super League	22	2	1	0	–		–		23	2
Chengdu Rongcheng	2024	Chinese Super League	10	0	0	0	–		–		10	0
Chengdu Rongcheng	Total		57	4	1	0	0	0	0	0	58	4
Shenzhen Peng City	2024	Chinese Super League	7	0	0	0	–		–		7	0
Shenzhen Peng City	2025	Chinese Super League	21	0	0	0	–		–		21	0
Shenzhen Peng City	Total		28	0	0	0	0	0	0	0	28	0
Career total			110	4	4	0	1	0	0	0	115	4

== Honours ==
=== Club ===
Guangzhou Evergrande

- Chinese Super League: 2016, 2019
- Chinese FA Cup: 2016
- Chinese FA Super Cup: 2018
