= 2021 Guangzhou F.C. season =

Guangzhou
- Chairman: Gao Han
- Manager: Fabio Cannavaro
- Stadium: Tianhe Stadium
- Super League: 3rd
- FA Cup: Fourth Round
- AFC Champions League: Group stage
- Top goalscorer: League: Ai Kesen (11); All: Ai Kesen (11)

The 2021 Guangzhou season is the 68th year in Guangzhou's existence and its 54th season in the Chinese football league, also its 32nd season in the top flight.

== Transfers ==
=== Out ===
Squad number	Position	Player	Age	Moving to	Type	Transfer fee	Date	Source
8	MF	(Brazil) Paulinho	31	(Saudi Arabia) Al Ahli Saudi FC			21 June 2021	

== Statistics ==
As of 9 May 2021

=== Appearances and goals ===
No.	Pos.	Player	Super League			FA Cup			Champions League			Total		
No.	Pos.	Player	Apps.	Starts	Goals	Apps.	Starts	Goals	Apps.	Starts	Goals	Apps.	Starts	Goals
2	DF	(China) Jiang Guangtai	4	4	0	0	0	0	0	0	0	4	4	0
3	DF	(China) Mei Fang	3	1	0	0	0	0	0	0	0	3	1	0
5	DF	(China) Zhang Linpeng	2	2	0	0	0	0	0	0	0	2	2	0
6	MF	(China) Liao Lisheng	4	4	0	0	0	0	0	0	0	4	4	0
7	FW	(China) Wei Shihao	3	1	0	0	0	0	0	0	0	3	1	0
9	FW	(China) Ai Kesen	4	3	1	0	0	0	0	0	0	4	3	1
10	MF	(China) Zheng Zhi	4	4	0	0	0	0	0	0	0	4	4	0
11	MF	(China) Gao Late	4	3	0	0	0	0	0	0	0	4	3	0
15	MF	(China) Yan Dinghao	4	4	0	0	0	0	0	0	0	4	4	0
16	MF	(China) Huang Bowen	4	0	0	0	0	0	0	0	0	4	0	0
17	FW	(China) Yang Liyu	3	2	1	0	0	0	0	0	0	3	2	1
18	FW	(China) A Lan	4	3	1	0	0	0	0	0	0	4	3	1
19	FW	(China) Fei Nanduo	1	0	0	0	0	0	0	0	0	1	0	0
21	DF	(China) Gao Zhunyi	4	4	1	0	0	0	0	0	0	4	4	1
22	MF	(China) Zhang Xiuwei	2	0	0	0	0	0	0	0	0	2	0	0
25	DF	(China) Deng Hanwen	3	3	0	0	0	0	0	0	0	3	3	0
27	DF	(China) Wu Shaocong	3	2	1	0	0	0	0	0	0	3	2	1
30	MF	(China) Yang Dejiang	1	0	0	0	0	0	0	0	0	1	0	0
32	GK	(China) Liu Dianzuo	4	4	0	0	0	0	0	0	0	4	4	0
33	MF	(China) Zhong Yihao	1	0	0	0	0	0	0	0	0	1	0	0
36	MF	(China) He Chao	1	0	0	0	0	0	0	0	0	1	0	0
TOTALS					5			0			0			5
