= Tang Shi (footballer) =

Chinese footballer

Tang Shi 唐诗
Personal information
- Date of birth: 24 January 1995 (age 31)
- Place of birth: Wuhan, Hubei, China
- Height: 1.76 m (5 ft 9 in)
- Position: Left winger

Team information
- Current team: Jiangxi Dingnan United
- Number: 10

Youth career
- 2006–2008: Wuhan Optics Valley
- 2009–2014: Shandong Luneng
- 2014–2015: Botafogo
- 2015: → Real Madrid (loan)

Senior career*
Years	Team	Apps	(Gls)
2015–2016	Gondomar	30	(12)
2016–2017	Meizhou Hakka	0	(0)
2016–2017	→ Paços de Ferreira (loan)	0	(0)
2017	→ Beijing Guoan (loan)	14	(0)
2018–2022	Guangzhou FC	6	(0)
2020	→ Beijing BSU (loan)	12	(1)
2021	→ Meizhou Hakka (loan)	9	(0)
2023–	Jiangxi Dingnan United	68	(10)

International career^{‡}
2011–2013	China U16	6	(2)
2013–2014	China U19	13	(4)
2016–2018	China U22	24	(4)
- * Club domestic league appearances and goals as of 1 March 2026 ‡ National team caps and goals as of 24 August 2018

Tang Shi (simplified Chinese: 唐诗; traditional Chinese: 唐詩; pinyin: Táng Shī; born 24 January 1995) is a Chinese professional footballer who plays as a left winger for Jiangxi Dingnan United.

== Club career ==
Tang Shi started his football career with Wuhan Optics Valley and joined Shandong Luneng's youth academy in 2009 after Wuhan's disbandment. He refused to sign a professional contract with Shandong and transferred to Série A side Botafogo's youth academy in May 2014. He was then given a trial with Real Madrid Castilla thanks to a youth training partnership between the two clubs; however, he remained at Botafogo's youth academy after the trial.

On 29 July 2015, Tang transferred to Campeonato de Portugal side Gondomar. He made his debut for the club on 23 August 2015 in a 3–0 win against Vila Real. He made thirty appearances and scored twelve goals for the club in the 2015-16 season. On 1 July 2016, Tang was loaned to Primeira Liga side Paços de Ferreira after signing with China League One side Meizhou Hakka. He made his debut for the club on 25 October 2016 in a 4–0 win against C.D. Nacional in the 2016-17 Taça da Liga.

After playing just two cup matches for Paços de Ferreira, Tang terminated his contract and was loaned to Chinese Super League side Beijing Guoan for one season in February 2017. On 5 March 2017, he made his debut for the club in the first match of the season in a 2–1 away loss against Guangzhou Evergrande. He was a regular starter at the beginning of season as the benefactor of the new rule of the league that at least one Under-23 player must be in the starting line-up. However, his playing time was on the decline during the season, and he eventually lost his position to Ba Dun after manager José González was sacked by the club in June 2017. Tang played 14 league matches for the club in the 2017 season.

On 24 December 2017, Tang transferred to top tier side Guangzhou Evergrande. He made his debut on 18 March 2018 in a 1–0 home win over Henan Jianye, coming on for Yu Hanchao in the 79th minute. He scored his first goal for the club on 2 May 2018, netting the opener in the 23rd minute in the 2018 Chinese FA Cup against Guizhou Hengfeng which Guangzhou eventually lost in the penalty shoot-out. Often used very sparingly, he would be loaned out to second tier club Beijing BSU on 11 September 2020 and another second tier club, Meizhou Hakka on 9 April 2021.

== Career statistics ==
As of 31 December 2025.

Appearances and goals by club, season and competition
Club	Season	League			National cup		League cup		Continental		Other		Total	
Club	Season	Division	Apps	Goals	Apps	Goals	Apps	Goals	Apps	Goals	Apps	Goals	Apps	Goals
Gondomar	2015–16	Campeonato de Portugal	30	12	3	1	–		–		–		33	13
Paços de Ferreira (loan)	2016–17	Primeira Liga	0	0	0	0	2	0	–		–		2	0
Beijing Guoan (loan)	2017	Chinese Super League	14	0	1	0	–		–		–		15	0
Guangzhou Evergrande	2018	Chinese Super League	5	0	2	1	–		0	0	0 (Note: Appearances in Chinese FA Super Cup)	0	7	1
Guangzhou Evergrande	2019	Chinese Super League	1	0	2	0	–		1	0	–		4	0
Guangzhou Evergrande	Total		6	0	4	1	0	0	1	0	0	0	11	1
Beijing BSU (loan)	2020	China League One	12	1	0	0	–		–		–		12	1
Meizhou Hakka (loan)	2021	China League One	9	0	1	0	–		–		–		10	0
Jiangxi Dingnan United	2023	China League One	23	3	1	1	–		–		–		24	4
Jiangxi Dingnan United	2024	China League One	15	2	0	0	–		–		–		15	2
Jiangxi Dingnan United	2025	China League One	30	5	0	0	–		–		–		30	5
Jiangxi Dingnan United	Total		68	10	1	1	0	0	0	0	0	0	69	11
Career total			139	23	10	3	2	0	1	0	0	0	152	26

== Honours ==
Guangzhou Evergrande

- Chinese Super League: 2019
- Chinese FA Super Cup: 2018
