= Feng Boxuan =

Chinese footballer (born 1997)

Feng Boxuan 冯博轩
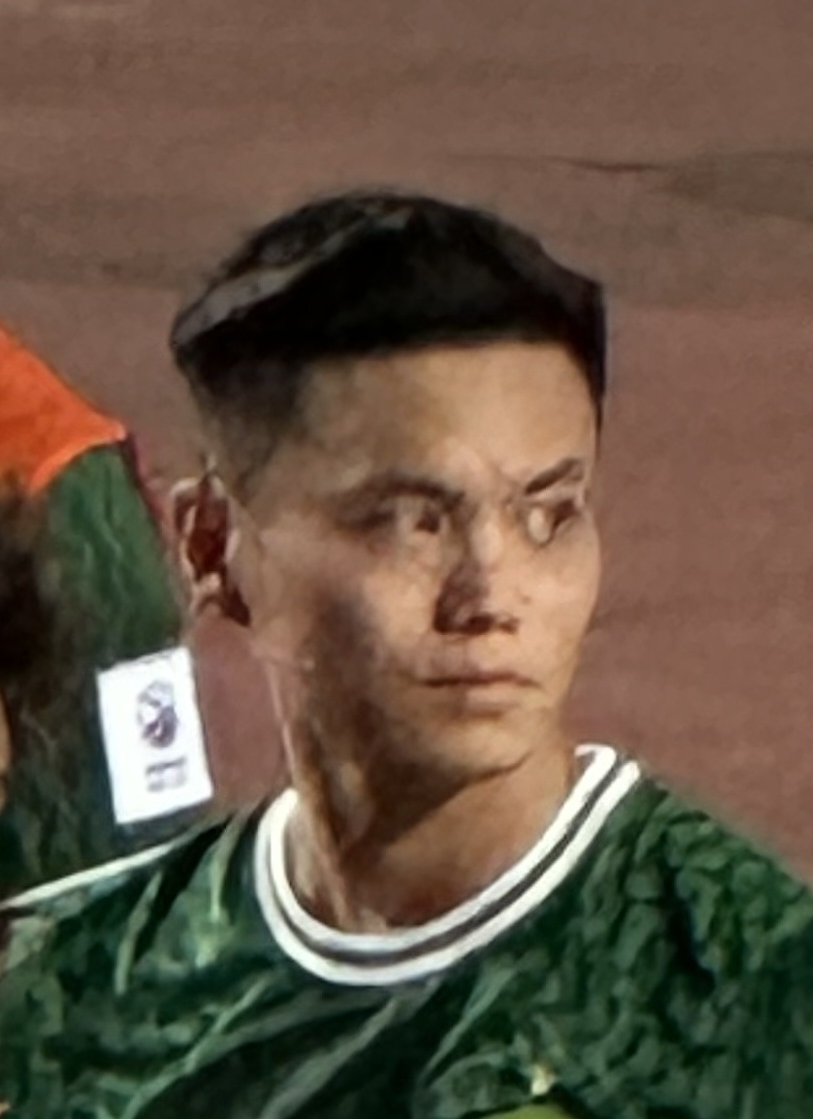
- Feng in 2024

Personal information
- Date of birth: 18 March 1997 (age 29)
- Place of birth: Wuhan, Hubei, China
- Height: 1.77 m (5 ft 10 in)
- Positions: Right-back; midfielder

Team information
- Current team: Dalian Yingbo
- Number: 12

Youth career
- 2010–2013: Hubei Youth
- 2013–2015: Oriental Dragon
- 2015: Torreense

Senior career*
Years	Team	Apps	(Gls)
2015–2017	Torreense	26	(4)
2017–2021	Guangzhou FC	8	(0)
2020	→ Henan Jianye (loan)	18	(2)
2021	→ Henan Songshan Longmen (loan)	16	(0)
2022	Henan Songshan Longmen	28	(1)
2023–2026	Beijing Guoan	40	(1)
2026–	Dalian Yingbo	13	(0)

International career^{‡}
2015–2016	China U19	22	(1)
2018–2020	China U23	9	(0)
- * Club domestic league appearances and goals as of 19 November 2026 ‡ National team caps and goals as of 19 November 2018

Feng Boxuan (Chinese: 冯博轩; pinyin: Féng Bóxuān; Mandarin pronunciation: [fə̌ŋ pwǒ ɕɥɛ́n]; born 18 March 1997) is a Chinese professional footballer who plays for Chinese Super League club Dalian Yingbo.

== Club career ==
Feng moved abroad in 2013 and joined Portuguese side Oriental Dragon, who was founded by the capital of China. He signed for Campeonato de Portugal side Torreense in October 2015 and was promoted to their first team in December 2015. He made his senior debut on 6 December 2015 in a 1–0 away defeat against Real, coming on as a substitute for Liu Junshuai in the 76th minute. On 20 December 2015, he scored his first senior goal in his third appearances for the club against Sacavenense, which Torreense won 2–0. He scored another goal of the season on 10 January 2016 in a 3–0 home win against Coruchense. Feng made 14 league appearances for Torreense in his second season with the club. On 13 November 2016, he scored his first goal of the season in a 1–0 away win against Vilafranquense. His second goal came on 27 November 2016 in a 4–1 home win against Angrense.

Feng transferred to Chinese Super League side Guangzhou Evergrande in July 2017. On 19 July 2017, he made his debut for the club in a 4–2 defeat against Guangzhou R&F at Yuexiushan Stadium in the first leg of the 2017 Chinese FA Cup fifth round, coming on as a substitute for Yu Hanchao in the 73rd minute. On 10 August 2017, he made his Super League debut in a 3–0 away win against Liaoning FC as the benefit of the new rule of the league that at least one Under-23 player must be in the starting line-up and was substituted off by Yu Hanchao in the 22nd minute. He would go on to establish himself as a squad player within the team as the club won the 2019 Chinese Super League.

On 20 July 2020, Feng joined Henan Jianye (re-named as Henan Songshan Longmen in 2021) on loan for the 2020 Chinese Super League season. He would make his debut for the club on 26 July 2020 in a league game against Jiangsu Suning in a 4–3 defeat. This would be followed by his first goal for the club, which was in a league game on 5 August 2020 against Guangzhou R&F in a 1–1 draw. For the following season he would return to Henan for another loan period on 8 April 2021. He would once again establish himself as regular within the team and on 28 April 2022, he joined Henan on a permanent deal.

On 30 March 2023, Feng joined Chinese Super League club Beijing Guoan.

On 3 July 2026, Feng transferred to Chinese Super League club Dalian Yingbo.

== Career statistics ==
As of match played 31 December 2025

Appearances and goals by club, season and competition
Club	Season	League			National cup		Continental		Other		Total	
Club	Season	Division	Apps	Goals	Apps	Goals	Apps	Goals	Apps	Goals	Apps	Goals
União Torreense	2015–16	Campeonato de Portugal	12	2	0	0	–		–		12	2
União Torreense	2016–17	Campeonato de Portugal	14	2	3	0	–		–		17	2
União Torreense	Total		26	4	3	0	0	0	0	0	29	4
Guangzhou Evergrande	2017	Chinese Super League	0	0	1	0	0	0	0 (Note: Appearances in Chinese FA Super Cup)	0	1	0
Guangzhou Evergrande	2018	Chinese Super League	5	0	2	0	0	0	1	0	8	0
Guangzhou Evergrande	2019	Chinese Super League	1	0	1	1	2	0	–		4	1
Guangzhou Evergrande	Total		6	0	4	1	2	0	1	0	13	1
Henan Jianye (loan)	2020	Chinese Super League	18	2	0	0	–		–		18	2
Henan Songshan Longmen (loan)	2021	Chinese Super League	16	0	5	1	–		–		21	1
Henan Songshan Longmen	2022	Chinese Super League	28	1	0	0	–		–		28	1
Henan Songshan Longmen	Total		44	1	5	1	0	0	0	0	49	2
Beijing Guoan	2023	Chinese Super League	15	1	2	0	–		–		17	1
Beijing Guoan	2024	Chinese Super League	15	0	2	0	–		–		17	0
Beijing Guoan	2025	Chinese Super League	8	0	3	0	3	0	–		14	0
Beijing Guoan	Total		38	1	7	0	3	0	0	0	48	1
Career total			132	8	19	2	5	0	1	0	157	10

== Honours ==
Guangzhou Evergrande

- Chinese Super League: 2017, 2019
- Chinese FA Super Cup: 2018

Beijing Guoan

- Chinese FA Cup: 2025
- Chinese FA Super Cup: 2026

Dalian Yingbo

- Chinese Super League: 2026
