= Ricardo Goulart =

Brazilian footballer (born 1991)

Personal information
- Full name: Ricardo Goulart Pereira
- Date of birth: 5 June 1991 (age 35)
- Place of birth: São José dos Campos, Brazil
- Height: 1.80 m (5 ft 11 in)
- Position: Attacking midfielder

Youth career
- 1998–2005: Moreira's Sport
- 2006–2009: Santo André

Senior career*
Years	Team	Apps	(Gls)
2009–2011	Santo André	34	(6)
2010–2011	→ Internacional (loan)	17	(5)
2012	Goiás	55	(21)
2013–2014	Cruzeiro	79	(29)
2015–2021	Guangzhou FC	117	(78)
2019	→ Palmeiras (loan)	9	(3)
2020	→ Hebei China Fortune (loan)	18	(4)
2022	Santos	20	(3)
2022–2023	Bahia	22	(5)
Total		371	(154)

International career
2014	Brazil	1	(0)
- * Club domestic league appearances and goals

Ricardo Goulart
- Chinese: 高拉特
Transcriptions
Standard Mandarin
- Hanyu Pinyin: Gāo Lātè

Alternative Chinese name
- Chinese: 里卡多·高拉特
Transcriptions
Standard Mandarin
- Hanyu Pinyin: Lǐkǎduō Gāolātè

Ricardo Goulart Pereira (Brazilian Portuguese: [ʁiˈkaʁdu ɡuˈlaʁ]; born 5 June 1991), known as Ricardo Goulart, is a Brazilian former footballer who played as an attacking midfielder.

Goulart started his career with Santo André in 2009, and remained at the club until 2011, with a loan to Internacional. He played the 2012 season Goiás in the second tier, before joining Cruzeiro the following year.

At Cruzeiro, Goulart cemented a place in the first team, and during his two-year stint, he made a total of 99 appearances and scored 34 times, winning the 2014 Brasileiro with the club. His personal awards include the 2014 Bola de Ouro, besides featuring in the team of the season. In 2015, he entered Asian football by signing for Chinese club Guangzhou Evergrande, where he won the Chinese Super League and AFC Champions League in his first season.

Goulart made his international debut for the Brazil national football team against Colombia in 2014.

== Club career ==
=== Santo André ===
Born in São José dos Campos, São Paulo, Goulart joined Santo André's youth setup in 2006, after failed trials at São Paulo, São Caetano, Taubaté and Paulista. In the 2009 season, after being the under-20's top scorer in the Copa São Paulo de Futebol Júnior, he was then promoted to the first team.

Goulart made his first team debut for Ramalhão on 25 February 2009, coming on as a second-half substitute and scoring the equalizer in a 2–1 Campeonato Paulista home win over Ituano. He scored four times in 12 appearances in the competition, as the club finished sixth.

Goulart made his Série A debut on 24 May 2009, replacing Antônio Flávio in a 1–2 home loss against Flamengo. He scored his first goal in the category on 25 July, but in a 2–3 loss at Grêmio, and featured sparingly in the league as his side suffered relegation.

==== Loan to Internacional ====
On 19 May 2010, Goulart was loaned to Internacional for one year, and was initially assigned to the B-team.

After winning the 2010 Copa FGF with the B's, Goulart was included in the main squad ahead of the 2011 campaign, and started the season as a starter. However, after the arrival of Dorival Júnior as manager, he lost space in the main squad and returned to his parent club when his loan expired in December 2011; Santo André also refused to keep him, and he was subsequently released.

=== Goiás ===
On 28 December 2011, Goulart agreed to a contract with Série B Goiás for the ensuing campaign. He made his debut for the club on 22 January, starting in a 5–0 Campeonato Goiano home routing of Aparecidense, and scored his first goal three days later in a 4–2 win at Morrinhos.

An immediate starter, Goulart won the 2012 Campeonato Goiano and the 2012 Série B with the side, scoring 25 goals overall and providing 14 assists as the club returned to the top tier. He notably scored three braces in the campaign, against Goianésia (2–1 home win), Ipatinga (6–0 away win) and Guaratinguetá (3–0 away win).

=== Cruzeiro ===
On 5 January 2013, Goulart was announced at Cruzeiro in the top tier. He made his debut for the club on 3 February, starting in a 2–1 Campeonato Mineiro home win over rivals Atlético Mineiro, and scored his first goal on 24 March in a 2–1 home win over Caldense.

Goulart was the league top scorer of Cruzeiro in his first season (along with Borges), scoring 10 goals as the club lifted the trophy. In August 2014, after winning the 2014 Mineiro, he was targeted by French club Monaco, but the offer was refused by Cruzeiro.

In the 2014 Copa Libertadores, Goulart was again the club's top goalscorer (along with Bruno Rodrigo), scoring four goals (including a hat-trick in a 5–1 home routing of Universidad de Chile) as his side was knocked out in the quarterfinals. In the year's Série A, he scored 15 goals and was the club's top goalscorer as they lifted a second consecutive league title. He was also named in the team of the season by CBF, and won the Bola de Ouro and Bola de Prata awards by Placar.

=== Guangzhou Evergrande ===
==== First seasons ====
In early January 2015, Goulart was linked to a move away from Cruzeiro to China and Mexico. On 13 January, he signed for Chinese Super League club Guangzhou Evergrande for € 15 million, on a four-year contract, being handed the no 11 jersey. It was the highest transfer fee paid by a Chinese club.

Goulart made his debut on 14 February 2015, replacing countryman Renê Júnior in a match against Shandong Luneng in Chinese Super Cup. He scored his first goal for his club on 25 February, in an AFC Champions League match against FC Seoul. He then scored a hat-trick in the same competition, against the defending champions Western Sydney Wanderers on 4 March. For his performance he was praised by manager Fabio Cannavaro who said "Goulart is undoubtedly a great player. As an individual player or as a team player he is helping us significantly".

Goulart's goal scoring form continued, as he again found the net by scoring a brace against Japanese club Kashima Antlers on 18 March 2015. In the league, he scored 19 goals as the club won their fifth title in a row.

On 22 February 2016, Goulart extended his contract with Guangzhou Evergrande to 31 January 2020. He again scored 19 league goals in that year, as the club won their sixth consecutive title. In 2017, he scored a career-best 20 goals, with Guangzhou winning another title.

==== Loan to Palmeiras and return ====
On 15 January 2019, Goulart moved to Palmeiras on a one-year deal, with a buyout clause. On 23 May, after struggling with injuries and only 12 matches, his loan was cut short and he returned to his parent club.

Goulart struggled with knee injuries for the remainder of the 2019 season, and did not play a single minute as the club had four foreign players registered.

==== Loan to Hebei China Fortune ====
On 19 July 2020, Goulart joined Hebei China Fortune on loan for the remainder of the year. He contributed with 18 appearances for the side, as they were knocked out of the league by his parent club.

==== 2021 season ====
Back to Guangzhou for the 2021 campaign, Goulart featured sparingly before terminating his contract in November 2021 in a mutual consent. It was reported that due to the financial difficulties of the club, the club failed to pay his wage.

=== Santos ===
On 11 January 2022, free agent Goulart was announced at Santos back in his home country, after agreeing to a two-year contract. He made his debut for the club on 2 February, starting in a 2–1 away win over rivals Corinthians.

Goulart scored his first goal for Peixe on 13 February 2022, netting the winner in a 2–1 home success over Ituano. However, he struggled to establish himself as a regular starter, and terminated his contract with the club on 12 July.

=== Bahia ===
On 2 August 2022, Goulart joined Bahia.

=== Retirement ===
At a press conference on 24 April 2023, Goulart announced his retirement from football at the age of 31.

== International career ==
On 19 August 2014, Goulart was called up to the Brazil national team for two matches against Colombia and Ecuador by new manager Dunga. After being an unused substitute against the former, he made his full international debut on 9 September, in a 1–0 victory against the latter.

Having only played a friendly match for Brazil, Goulart was subsequently naturalized as a Chinese citizen, being one of the six football players at the time who had no Chinese ancestry to have been naturalized as Chinese citizens, with another notable player being Elkeson, another former Brazilian. However, it became unclear whether he would be able to represent the national team, as he did not complete the five-year residency rules after leaving the country between October 2018 and May 2019.

== Style of play ==
Goulart plays primarily as an attacking midfielder and is also capable of playing as forward through the centre or as a winger on either flank. He has also been noted for his ball striking and attacking runs into the area

== Personal life ==
In 2009, Goulart married Diane. His brother Juninho is also a footballer, best known for his tenure with MLS club LA Galaxy.

Goulart became a naturalised Chinese citizen on 17 July 2019. After leaving Guangzhou in November 2021, Chinese media reported that he gave up on his Chinese nationality as he returned to Brazil, but he was still registered as a foreigner in the 2022 season, as he did not start the documentation process to get back his Brazilian nationality.

== Career statistics ==
=== Club ===
As of 2 April 2023.

Appearances and goals by club, season and competition
Club	Season	League			State league (Note: Includes Campeonato Paulista, Campeonato Gaúcho, Campeonato Mineiro, Campeonato Goiano, Campeonato Baiano)		National cup (Note: Includes Copa do Brasil, Chinese FA Cup)		Continental		Other		Total	
Club	Season	Division	Apps	Goals	Apps	Goals	Apps	Goals	Apps	Goals	Apps	Goals	Apps	Goals
Santo André	2009	Série A	14	1	12	4	—		—		—		26	5
Santo André	2010	Série A	0	0	8	1	—		—		—		8	1
Santo André	Total		14	1	20	5	—		—		—		34	6
Internacional (loan)	2010	Série A	0	0	—		—		—		13 (Note: Appearances in Copa FGF)	6	13	6
Internacional (loan)	2011	Série A	10	1	7	4	—		1 (Note: Appearances in Copa Libertadores)	0	—		18	5
Internacional (loan)	Total		10	1	7	4	—		1	0	13	6	31	11
Goiás	2012	Série B	34	12	21	9	8	4	—		—		63	25
Cruzeiro	2013	Série A	33	10	10	3	6	1	—		—		49	14
Cruzeiro	2014	Série A	26	15	10	1	5	0	9	4	—		50	20
Cruzeiro	Total		59	25	20	4	11	1	9	4	—		99	34
Guangzhou Evergrande	2015	Chinese Super League	27	19	—		0	0	14 (Note: Appearances in AFC Champions League)	8	4 (Note: One appearance in Chinese Super Cup, three appearances in FIFA Club World Cup)	0	45	27
Guangzhou Evergrande	2016	Chinese Super League	29	19	—		7	4	6	3	1 (Note: Appearance in Chinese Super Cup)	2	43	28
Guangzhou Evergrande	2017	Chinese Super League	29	20	—		1	0	10	7	1	0	41	27
Guangzhou Evergrande	2018	Chinese Super League	19	13	—		0	0	8	7	1	1	28	21
Guangzhou Evergrande	2020	Chinese Super League	0	0	—		0	0	4	0	—		4	0
Guangzhou Evergrande	2021	Chinese Super League	13	7	—		0	0	0	0	—		13	7
Guangzhou Evergrande	Total		117	78	—		8	4	42	25	7	3	174	110
Palmeiras (loan)	2019	Série A	1	0	8	3	0	0	3	1	—		12	4
Hebei China Fortune (loan)	2020	Chinese Super League	18	4	—		0	0	—		—		18	4
Santos	2022	Série A	11	0	9	3	4	1	6 (Note: Appearances in Copa Sudamericana)	0	—		30	4
Bahia	2022	Série B	16	2	—		—		—		—		16	2
Bahia	2023	Série A	0	0	10	3	1	0	—		5 (Note: Appearances in Copa do Nordeste)	0	16	3
Bahia	Total		16	2	10	3	1	0	—		5	0	32	5
Career total			280	123	95	31	32	10	61	30	25	9	493	203

=== International ===
As of 6 January 2022

Brazil
Year	Apps	Goals
2014	1	0
Total	1	0

== Honours ==
=== Club ===
Internacional

- Copa FGF: 2010

Cruzeiro

- Campeonato Brasileiro Série A: 2013, 2014

Guangzhou Evergrande

- AFC Champions League: 2015
- Chinese Super League: 2015, 2016, 2017
- Chinese FA Cup: 2016
- Chinese FA Super Cup: 2016, 2017, 2018

Bahia

- Campeonato Baiano: 2023

=== Individual ===
- Bola de Ouro: 2014
- Bola de Prata: 2014
- Campeonato Brasileiro Série A Team of the Year: 2014
- Troféu Mesa Redonda Best Player: 2014
- Chinese Football Association Footballer of the Year: 2015, 2016
- Chinese Super League Team of the Year: 2015, 2016, 2017
- AFC Champions League Top Scorer: 2015
- AFC Champions League Most Valuable Player: 2015
- AFC Foreign Player of the Year: 2015
- Chinese FA Super Cup Most Valuable player: 2016
- Chinese Super League Golden Boot winner: 2016

== See also ==
- List of Chinese naturalized footballers
