= Deng Yubiao =

Chinese footballer

Deng Yubiao 邓宇彪
Personal information
- Date of birth: 8 June 1997 (age 29)
- Place of birth: Haifeng, Guangdong, China
- Height: 1.81 m (5 ft 11 in)
- Position: Midfielder

Team information
- Current team: Nantong Zhiyun
- Number: 26

Youth career
- Guangdong Sports School
- 2013–2015: Oriental Dragon
- 2015–2016: Torreense

Senior career*
Years	Team	Apps	(Gls)
2016–2017	Pinhalnovense	5	(0)
2017–2021	Guangzhou FC	4	(0)
2019	→ Guangdong South China Tiger (loan)	25	(0)
2020	→ Shijiazhuang Ever Bright (loan)	3	(0)
2021	→ Suzhou Dongwu (loan)	29	(0)
2022	Chongqing Liangjiang	0	(0)
2022	Nanjing City	28	(1)
2023	Guangzhou E-Power		
2024–2025	Suzhou Dongwu	36	(0)
2025	Meizhou Hakka	7	(0)
2026–	Nantong Zhiyun	0	(0)

International career^{‡}
2015–2016	China U19	13	(0)
2018	China U22	6	(1)
- * Club domestic league appearances and goals as of 28 August 2025 ‡ National team caps and goals as of 4 September 2018

Deng Yubiao (Chinese: 邓宇彪; pinyin: Dèng Yǔbiāo; born 8 June 1997) is a Chinese footballer who plays as a midfielder for Nantong Zhiyun.

== Club career ==
Deng Yubiao moved aboard in 2013 and joined Portuguese side Oriental Dragon, who was founded by capital of China. He joined Campeonato de Portugal side Pinhalnovense in July 2016. On 28 August 2016, he made his senior debut in a 1–0 home win against Farense, coming on for Luís Leite in the injury time.

Deng transferred to Chinese Super League side Guangzhou Evergrande Taobao in July 2017. He made his debut for the club on 18 March 2018 in a 1–0 home win over Henan Jianye, coming on as a substitute for Alan Carvalho in the 85th minute.

On 27 February 2019, Deng was loaned to China League One side Guangdong South China Tiger for the 2019 season.

On 22 February 2026, Deng joined China League One side Nantong Zhiyun.

== Career statistics ==
As of 31 December 2020.

Appearances and goals by club, season and competition
Club	Season	League			National Cup		Continental		Other		Total	
Club	Season	Division	Apps	Goals	Apps	Goals	Apps	Goals	Apps	Goals	Apps	Goals
Pinhalnovense	2016–17	Campeonato de Portugal	5	0	2	0	-		-		7	0
Guangzhou Evergrande	2017	Chinese Super League	0	0	0	0	0	0	0 (Note: Appearances in Chinese FA Super Cup)	0	0	0
Guangzhou Evergrande	2018	Chinese Super League	4	0	2	0	0	0	0	0	6	0
Guangzhou Evergrande	Total		4	0	2	0	0	0	0	0	6	0
Guangdong South China Tiger (loan)	2019	China League One	25	0	0	0	-		-		25	0
Shijiazhuang Ever Bright (loan)	2020	Chinese Super League	3	0	1	0	-		-		4	0
Career total			37	0	5	0	0	0	0	0	42	0

== Honours ==
Guangzhou Evergrande

- Chinese Super League: 2017
- Chinese FA Super Cup: 2018
