= Xu Xin (footballer) =

Chinese footballer (born 1994)

Xu Xin 徐新
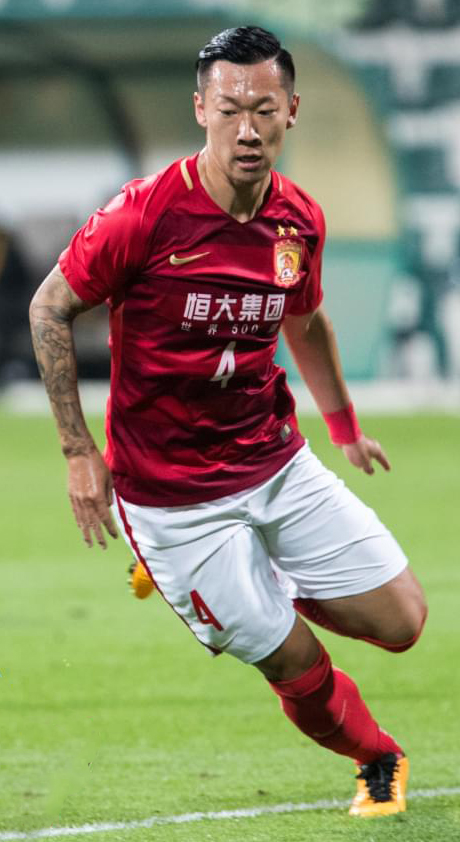
- Xin playing for Guangzhou Evergrande in 2018

Personal information
- Date of birth: 19 April 1994 (age 32)
- Place of birth: Shenyang, Liaoning, China
- Height: 1.79 m (5 ft 10 in)
- Position: Defensive midfielder

Team information
- Current team: Yunnan Yukun
- Number: 8

Youth career
- 2006–2010: Tianjin Teda
- 2010: Shanghai Shenhua
- 2010–2013: Atlético Madrid

Senior career*
Years	Team	Apps	(Gls)
2013–2015	Atlético Madrid B	8	(1)
2013–2015	Atlético Madrid C	50	(1)
2016–2020	Guangzhou Evergrande	58	(1)
2021	Shandong Taishan	21	(3)
2022–2025	Shanghai Port	76	(3)
2026–	Yunnan Yukun	24	(1)

International career^{‡}
2009–2011	China U-16	10	(5)
2011–2012	China U-19	13	(2)
2013–2015	China U-23	18	(6)
2021–	China	16	(1)
Medal record
Representing China
Men's football
EAFF Championship
Bronze medal – third place	2025 South Korea	Team
- * Club domestic league appearances and goals as of 19 November 2026 ‡ National team caps and goals as of 26 January 2024

Xu Xin (Chinese: 徐新; pinyin: Xú Xīn; Mandarin pronunciation: [ɕy̌ ɕín]; born 19 April 1994) is a Chinese professional footballer who currently plays as a defensive midfielder for Yunnan Yukun and China national team.

== Club career ==
=== Youth ===
Xu started his football career when he joined Tianjin Teda's youth academy in 2006. After switching to Shanghai Shenhua's youth academy, he then transferred to La Liga side Atlético Madrid's youth academy in 2010. On 11 May 2013, Xu was promoted to Atlético Madrid B's squad and made his debut for the club on 12 May 2013 in a 1–0 loss against CD Marino, coming on as a substitute for Vicente Romero in the 66th minute. He made his debut for Atlético Madrid C on 25 August 2013 in a 2–2 draw against AD Parla, coming on as a substitute for Samuel Villa in the 71st minute.

=== Guanzhou Evergrande ===
On 25 December 2015, Xu transferred to Chinese Super League side Guangzhou Evergrande for a fee of €4.3 million. He made his debut for the club on 1 April 2016 in a 2–0 win against Guangzhou R&F, coming on as a substitute for Huang Bowen in the 71st minute. On 1 April 2017, Xu suffered a ligament rupture in his left ankle in a 3–2 win against Shanghai SIPG. In July 2018, Xu was reportedly about to be loaned to China League One side Wuhan Zall for a half season. However, the deal couldn't be completed due to Guangzhou Evergrande and Wuhan Zall falling out over a dispute about Yang Chaosheng.

=== Shandong Taishan ===
On 12 April 2021, Xu joined fellow Chinese Super League club Shandong Taishan. He helped Shandong win the club's first Chinese Super League title in 11 years in his debut season, which was his personal 4th league title. On 9 January 2022, he started in a 1-0 win against Shanghai Port in the 2021 Chinese FA Cup final, completing a domestic double.

=== Shanghai Port ===
After only one season, Xu would join fellow top tier club Shanghai Port on 18 April 2022. He would make his debut for the club in a league game on 4 June 2022 against Wuhan Yangtze River in a 1–0 defeat, where he also received his first red card in his career. He would later on go on to redeem himself when he scored his first goal for the club on 25 June 2022 in a league game against Wuhan Yangtze River once more in a 2–1 victory.

On 29 October 2023, Xu won his fifth league title and first one with Shanghai Port after a 1–1 home draw against direct competitor and his former club Shandong Taishan. He became only the second player in history to win the Chinese Super League with 3 different clubs after former Evergrande teammate Zheng Zhi.

On 31 December 2025, Xu announced his departure after the 2025 season.

On 5 January 2026, Xu joined Chinese Super League club Yunnan Yukun.

== International career ==
On 11 November 2021, Xu made his international debut in a 1–1 draw against Oman in the third round of 2022 FIFA World Cup qualification. On 1 February 2022, he scored his first international goal in a 3–1 defeat against Vietnam in the same phase.

On 21 December 2023, Xu was named in China's squad for the 2023 AFC Asian Cup as replacement for Nico Yennaris. He came on as a 58th minute substitute in the team's opening match against Tajikistan on 13 January 2024.

== Career statistics ==
=== Club ===
As of 1 March 2026

Appearances and goals by club, season and competition
Club	Season	League			National cup		Continental		Other		Total	
Club	Season	Division	Apps	Goals	Apps	Goals	Apps	Goals	Apps	Goals	Apps	Goals
Atlético Madrid B	2012-13	Segunda División B	1	0	–		–		–		1	0
Atlético Madrid B	2013-14	Segunda División B	1	0	–		–		–		1	0
Atlético Madrid B	2015-16	Tercera División	6	1	–		–		–		6	1
Atlético Madrid B	Total		8	1	0	0	0	0	0	0	8	1
Atlético Madrid C	2013-14	Tercera División	23	0	–		–		–		23	0
Atlético Madrid C	2014-15	Tercera División	27	1	–		–		–		27	1
Atlético Madrid C	Total		50	1	0	0	0	0	0	0	50	1
Guangzhou Evergrande	2016	Chinese Super League	5	0	1	0	3	0	0 (Note: Appearances in Chinese FA Super Cup)	0	9	0
Guangzhou Evergrande	2017	Chinese Super League	14	0	5	0	1	0	0	0	20	0
Guangzhou Evergrande	2018	Chinese Super League	7	0	2	0	1	0	1	0	11	0
Guangzhou Evergrande	2019	Chinese Super League	18	1	2	0	3	0	–		23	1
Guangzhou Evergrande	2020	Chinese Super League	14	0	0	0	2	0	–		16	0
Guangzhou Evergrande	Total		58	1	10	0	10	0	1	0	79	1
Shandong Taishan	2021	Chinese Super League	21	3	1	0	–		–		22	3
Shanghai Port	2022	Chinese Super League	13	1	4	0	–		–		17	1
Shanghai Port	2023	Chinese Super League	23	0	1	0	1	0	–		25	0
Shanghai Port	2024	Chinese Super League	25	1	5	0	9	0	1	0	40	1
Shanghai Port	2025	Chinese Super League	16	1	1	0	2	0	0	0	19	1
Shanghai Port	Total		77	3	11	0	12	0	1	0	101	3
Career total			214	9	22	0	22	0	2	0	260	9

=== International ===
Appearances and goals by national team and year
National team	Year	Apps	Goals
China	2021	2	0
China	2022	4	1
China	2023	7	0
China	2024	3	0
Total		16	1

Scores and results list China's goal tally first, score column indicates score after each Xu goal.

List of international goals scored by Xu Xin
No.	Date	Venue	Opponent	Score	Result	Competition
1	1 February 2022	Mỹ Đình National Stadium, Hanoi, Vietnam	Vietnam	1–3	1–3	2022 FIFA World Cup qualification

== Honours ==
Guangzhou Evergrande

- Chinese Super League: 2016, 2017, 2019
- Chinese FA Cup: 2016
- Chinese FA Super Cup: 2016, 2017, 2018

Shandong Taishan

- Chinese Super League: 2021
- Chinese FA Cup: 2021

Shanghai Port

- Chinese Super League: 2023, 2024, 2025
- Chinese FA Cup: 2024
