= Nemanja Gudelj =

Serbian footballer (born 1991)

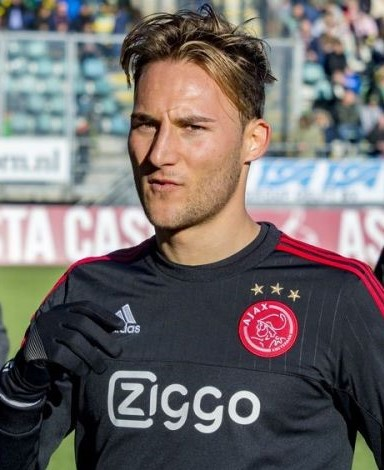
- Gudelj with Ajax in 2016

Personal information
- Full name: Nemanja Gudelj
- Date of birth: 16 November 1991 (age 35)
- Place of birth: Belgrade, SR Serbia, SFR Yugoslavia
- Height: 1.87 m (6 ft 2 in)
- Positions: Defensive midfielder; centre-back

Team information
- Current team: Getafe
- Number: 8

Youth career
- 1998–2001: BSV Boeimeer
- 2001–2009: NAC

Senior career*
Years	Team	Apps	(Gls)
2009–2013	NAC	79	(8)
2013–2015	AZ	61	(16)
2015–2017	Ajax	40	(6)
2017	Tianjin Teda	19	(1)
2018–2019	Guangzhou Evergrande	11	(2)
2018–2019	→ Sporting CP (loan)	27	(1)
2019–2026	Sevilla	196	(7)
2026–	Getafe	9	(0)

International career^{‡}
2010–2012	Serbia U21	15	(2)
2014–	Serbia	79	(1)
- * Club domestic league appearances and goals as of 23:24, 8 November 2026 (UTC) ‡ National team caps and goals as of 4 October 2026

Nemanja Gudelj (Serbian Cyrillic: Немања Гудељ; born 16 November 1991) is a Serbian professional footballer who plays as a defensive midfielder or centre-back for La Liga club Getafe and the Serbia national team.

== Club career ==
=== NAC Breda ===
Gudelj signed his first professional contract with NAC Breda in July 2009 but failed to make an official appearance in his debut season despite being named on the bench several times.

=== AZ ===
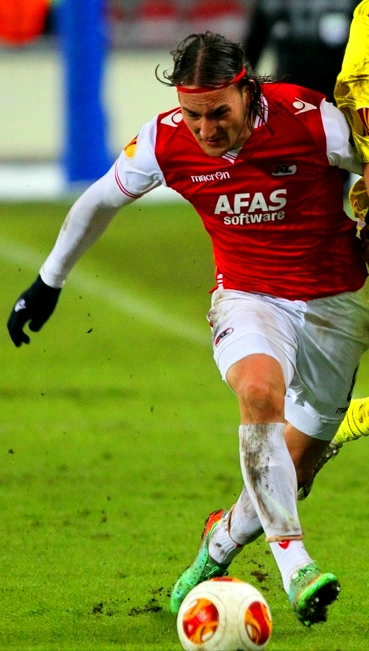
Gudelj playing for AZ in 2014

In the summer of 2013 Gudelj transferred to AZ Alkmaar for a fee of around €3 million, sold by his father who was manager at NAC, signing a four-year contract.

He received interest from Portuguese club Porto.

=== Ajax ===
On 6 May 2015, it was announced that Gudelj would join AFC Ajax starting from the 2015–16 season. Along with him, his younger brother Dragiša would move to Ajax youth team and his father Nebojša would become a scout for the club focusing primarily on scouting players from the Balkans and Serbia. On 5 November 2016, Gudelj was removed from the first team selection after stating he couldn't be motivated when not starting.

=== Tianjin TEDA ===
On 5 January 2017, Ajax announced Gudelj would transfer to Tianjin TEDA on 25 January 2017 for a sum rumoured to be around €5.5 million.

=== Guangzhou Evergrande Taobao ===
On 28 January 2018, Guangzhou Evergrande Taobao announced that Gudelj was transferred from Tianjin TEDA and signed a 2-year contract. The transfer fee was not announced. He made his debut for Guangzhou on 21 February 2018 in a 0–0 away draw against Cerezo Osaka in the second group stage match of 2018 AFC Champions League. On 14 March, he scored his first goal for the club in the fourth group stage match of the AFC Champions League against Jeju United, which ensured Guangzhou Evergrande's 2–0 away win. Gudelj was excluded from first team squad in July 2018 due to the limitation of the number of foreign players.

==== Sporting CP (loan) ====
On 23 August 2018, Gudelj was loaned to Primeira Liga side Sporting CP for the 2018–19 season. The contract at will extend for four years as a Sporting CP player. The actual loan contract expires in the end of the season so he would move as a free player .

=== Sevilla ===
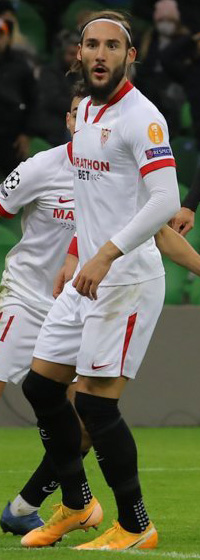
Gudelj playing for Sevilla in 2020

On 23 July 2019, Gudelj signed with Spanish La Liga side Sevilla. In July 2020, he tested positive for COVID-19. He scored his first goal for the club in a 1–0 away victory over Mallorca o 15 October 2022. A year later, on 3 October, he netted his first UEFA Champions League goal in a 2–2 away draw with PSV Eindhoven.

Following the retirement of Jesús Navas in December 2024, Gudelj succeeded him as Sevilla's club captain. Gudelj left Sevilla at the end of the 2025–26 season after seven years at the club. He made 261 official appearances, becoming the club's fifth-most capped foreign player, and won two UEFA Europa League titles, in 2019–20 and 2022–23.

=== Getafe ===
On 30 August 2026, Gudelj signed for fellow La Liga side Getafe.

== International career ==
Having represented Serbia at the U19 and U21 levels, Gudelj debuted for the senior squad on 5 March 2014 in a 2–1 away victory against the Republic of Ireland in a friendly match after coming on as a last minute substitute for Antonio Rukavina. He scored his first goal the same year on 18 November in a 2–0 away friendly victory against Greece.

In November 2022, Gudelj was selected in Serbia's squad for the 2022 FIFA World Cup. He played in group stage matches against Brazil and Switzerland. Serbia finished fourth in the group.

Gudelj was part of the Serbia squad for UEFA Euro 2024 and started the team's opening match of the tournament against England, playing the first half of the 1–0 loss before being replaced by Ivan Ilić. He also played in a group stage match against Denmark, where Serbia finished fourth in the group.

== Personal life ==
Gudelj is the son of former player Nebojša Gudelj and the older brother of Dragiša Gudelj.

In August 2023, Gudelj married his girlfriend Anastasija Ražnatović, the daughter of Ceca and Arkan, in a secret ceremony at Rajinovac.

== Career statistics ==
=== Club ===
As of match played 8 November 2026

Appearances and goals by club, season and competition
Club	Season	League			National cup (Note: Includes KNVB Cup, Chinese FA Cup, Taça de Portugal, Copa del Rey)		League cup (Note: Includes Taça da Liga)		Continental		Other		Total	
Club	Season	Division	Apps	Goals	Apps	Goals	Apps	Goals	Apps	Goals	Apps	Goals	Apps	Goals
NAC Breda	2009–10	Eredivisie	0	0	0	0	—		0	0	—		0	0
NAC Breda	2010–11	Eredivisie	29	2	4	0	—		—		—		33	2
NAC Breda	2011–12	Eredivisie	16	1	1	0	—		—		—		17	1
NAC Breda	2012–13	Eredivisie	34	5	3	0	—		—		—		37	5
NAC Breda	Total		79	8	8	0	—		0	0	—		87	8
AZ	2013–14	Eredivisie	29	5	5	0	—		14 (Note: Appearances in UEFA Europa League)	1	5 (Note: One appearance in Johan Cruyff Shield, four appearances and one goal in Eredivisie Europa League play-offs)	1	53	7
AZ	2014–15	Eredivisie	32	11	4	1	—		—		—		36	12
AZ	Total		61	16	9	1	—		14	1	5	1	89	19
Ajax	2015–16	Eredivisie	34	4	2	0	—		10 (Note: Two appearances and one goal in UEFA Champions League, eight appearances in UEFA Europa League)	1	—		46	5
Ajax	2016–17	Eredivisie	6	2	0	0	—		7 (Note: Three appearances in UEFA Champions League, four appearances in UEFA Europa League)	0	—		13	2
Ajax	Total		40	6	2	0	—		17	1	—		59	7
Tianjin TEDA	2017	Chinese Super League	19	1	1	0	—		—		—		20	1
Guangzhou Evergrande	2018	Chinese Super League	11	2	0	0	—		6 (Note: Appearances in AFC Champions League)	1	1 (Note: Appearance in Chinese FA Super Cup)	0	18	3
Sporting CP (loan)	2018–19	Primeira Liga	27	1	7	0	4	0	5	0	—		43	1
Sevilla	2019–20	La Liga	24	0	4	0	—		10	0	—		38	0
Sevilla	2020–21	La Liga	30	0	6	0	—		7 (Note: Appearances in UEFA Champions League)	0	1 (Note: Appearance in UEFA Super Cup)	0	44	0
Sevilla	2021–22	La Liga	21	0	4	0	—		3	0	—		28	0
Sevilla	2022–23	La Liga	34	3	5	0	—		14 (Note: Six appearances in UEFA Champions League, eight appearances and one goal in UEFA Europa League)	1	—		53	4
Sevilla	2023–24	La Liga	22	1	1	0	—		6	2	1	0	30	3
Sevilla	2024–25	La Liga	31	1	0	0	—		—		—		31	1
Sevilla	2025–26	La Liga	34	2	3	0	—		—		—		37	2
Sevilla	Total		196	7	23	0	—		40	3	2	0	261	10
Getafe	2026–27	La Liga	9	0	0	0	—		—		—		9	0
Career total			442	41	50	1	4	0	82	6	8	1	586	49

=== International ===
As of match played 4 October 2026

Appearances and goals by national team and year
National team	Year	Apps	Goals
Serbia	2014	9	1
Serbia	2015	2	0
Serbia	2016	5	0
Serbia	2017	6	0
Serbia	2018	0	0
Serbia	2019	3	0
Serbia	2020	8	0
Serbia	2021	11	0
Serbia	2022	7	0
Serbia	2023	9	0
Serbia	2024	6	0
Serbia	2025	8	0
Serbia	2026	5	0
Total		79	1

Scores and results list Serbia's goal tally first, score column indicates score after each Gudelj goal.

List of international goals scored by Nemanja Gudelj
No.	Date	Venue	Opponent	Score	Result	Competition
1	18 November 2014	Perivolia Municipal Stadium, Chania, Greece	Greece	2–0	2–0	Friendly

== Honours ==
Guangzhou Evergrande Taobao

- Chinese FA Super Cup: 2018

Sporting CP

- Taça de Portugal: 2018–19
- Taça da Liga: 2018–19

Sevilla

- UEFA Europa League: 2019–20, 2022–23
