= Zhang Chenglin =

Chinese footballer (born 1987)

Zhang Chenglin 张成林
Personal information
- Full name: Zhang Chenglin[张成林]
- Date of birth: 20 January 1987 (age 39)
- Place of birth: Guzhen, Anhui, China
- Height: 1.83 m (6 ft 0 in)
- Position: Defender

Youth career
- 2000–2001: Genbao Football Academy
- 2001–2004: Shenyang Ginde

Senior career*
| Years | Team | Apps | (Gls) |
| 2005–2010 | Changsha Ginde | 75 | (5) |
| 2011–2016 | Beijing Renhe | 148 | (17) |
| 2017–2022 | Guangzhou FC | 24 | (1) |
| 2019 | → Tianjin Tianhai (loan) | 15 | (2) |
| 2020 | → Wuhan Zall (loan) | 17 | (1) |
| 2021 | → Kunshan FC (loan) | 30 | (2) |

International career
| 2010–2011 | China | 2 | (0) |

Managerial career
- 2022–2023: Guangzhou FC (titness)
- * Club domestic league appearances and goals as of 23 April 2023

Zhang Chenglin (Chinese: 张成林; pinyin: Zhāng Chénglín; Mandarin pronunciation: [ʈʂáŋ ʈʂʰə̌ŋ lǐn]; born 20 January 1987) is a Chinese former professional footballer who played as a defender.

== Club career ==
Zhang Chenglin started his football career with Shenyang Ginde when he first played in a league game against Liaoning FC on 14 August 2005 in a 1–1 draw. He would often be used as a versatile substitute for the next several seasons and was part of the squad that moved to Changsha while the club renamed themselves Changsha Ginde. It wasn't until the arrival of Zhu Bo as the club's manager before Zhang started to become a more regular starter for the club and he went on to score his first league goal against Guangzhou Pharmaceutical on 3 July 2009 in a 4–2 win. By the 2010 league season, Zhang would start to settle within the team's central defense by the newly appointed manager Miodrag Ješić and would even start to produce a steady partnership with Wang Qiang. However, this was little too late for the club and the team were relegated at the end of season.

Zhang then transferred to top-tier side Shaanxi Chanba in December 2010 with his younger brother Zhang Chengxiang. He would go on to make his league debut for the club on 10 April 2011 against Shenzhen Ruby as a substitute for Li Chunyu in a 1–0 victory. After the game, he would then become a vital member within the team's defence and eventually go on to score his first goal for the club in a league game against Nanchang Hengyuan on 23 October 2011 in a 3–1 defeat. At the beginning of the 2012 season, Zhang followed the club when it decided to move to Guizhou and rename themselves Guizhou Renhe.

Zhang transferred to Chinese Super League side Guangzhou Evergrande on 29 November 2016. He made his debut on 10 March 2017 in a 2–1 away loss against Shandong Luneng Taishan, coming on as a substitute for Chen Zepeng in the 85th minute. On 1 August 2017, he scored his first goal for the club in the second leg of 2017 Chinese FA Cup fifth round against city rival Guangzhou R&F, which Guangzhou Evergrande won 7–2. On 28 October 2018, he scored his first league goal for Guangzhou in a 3–0 away win over Guizhou Hengfeng.

On 7 February 2019, Zhang was loaned to fellow first-tier club Tianjin Tianhai for the 2019 season. On 1 March 2019, he made his debut for the club in a 3–0 away defeat against his former club Guangzhou Evergrande.

== International career ==
On 12 October 2010, Zhang made his debut for the Chinese national team when the national team manager Gao Hongbo called him up for a friendly against Uruguay, which Zhang came on as a substitute for Yang Hao in a 4–0 defeat.

== Career statistics ==
As of 13 December 2021

Appearances and goals by club, season and competition
| Club | Season | League | | | National cup | | Continental | | Other | | Total | |
| Club | Season | Division | Apps | Goals | Apps | Goals | Apps | Goals | Apps | Goals | Apps | Goals |
|---|---|---|---|---|---|---|---|---|---|---|---|---|
| Changsha Ginde | 2005 | Chinese Super League | 9 | 0 | ? | 0 | — | | — | | 9 | 0 |
| Changsha Ginde | 2006 | Chinese Super League | 11 | 0 | ? | 0 | — | | — | | 11 | 0 |
| Changsha Ginde | 2007 | Chinese Super League | 4 | 0 | — | | — | | — | | 4 | 0 |
| Changsha Ginde | 2008 | Chinese Super League | 5 | 1 | — | | — | | — | | 5 | 1 |
| Changsha Ginde | 2009 | Chinese Super League | 19 | 1 | — | | — | | — | | 19 | 1 |
| Changsha Ginde | 2010 | Chinese Super League | 27 | 3 | — | | — | | — | | 27 | 3 |
| Changsha Ginde | Total | | 75 | 5 | 0 | 0 | 0 | 0 | 0 | 0 | 75 | 5 |
| Beijing Renhe | 2011 | Chinese Super League | 24 | 1 | 2 | 0 | — | | — | | 26 | 1 |
| Beijing Renhe | 2012 | Chinese Super League | 29 | 4 | 6 | 1 | — | | — | | 35 | 5 |
| Beijing Renhe | 2013 | Chinese Super League | 26 | 5 | 5 | 0 | 5 | 1 | — | | 36 | 6 |
| Beijing Renhe | 2014 | Chinese Super League | 26 | 3 | 2 | 0 | 5 | 0 | 1 (Note: Appearance(s) in Chinese FA Super Cup) | 0 | 34 | 3 |
| Beijing Renhe | 2015 | Chinese Super League | 29 | 4 | 2 | 0 | — | | — | | 31 | 4 |
| Beijing Renhe | 2016 | Chinese League One | 14 | 1 | 0 | 0 | — | | — | | 14 | 1 |
| Beijing Renhe | Total | | 148 | 18 | 17 | 1 | 10 | 1 | 1 | 0 | 176 | 20 |
| Guangzhou Evergrande | 2017 | Chinese Super League | 6 | 0 | 5 | 1 | 1 | 0 | 1 | 0 | 13 | 1 |
| Guangzhou Evergrande | 2018 | Chinese Super League | 11 | 1 | 2 | 0 | 1 | 0 | 0 | 0 | 14 | 1 |
| Guangzhou Evergrande | Total | | 17 | 1 | 7 | 1 | 2 | 0 | 1 | 0 | 27 | 2 |
| Tianjin Tianhai (loan) | 2019 | Chinese Super League | 15 | 2 | 2 | 0 | — | | — | | 17 | 2 |
| Wuhan Zall (loan) | 2020 | Chinese Super League | 17 | 1 | 3 | 0 | — | | 1 (Note: Appearance(s) in CSL Relegation play-offs) | 0 | 21 | 1 |
| Kunshan F.C. (loan) | 2021 | China League One | 30 | 2 | 1 | 1 | — | | — | | 31 | 3 |
| Career total | | | 302 | 29 | 30 | 3 | 12 | 1 | 3 | 0 | 347 | 33 |

== Honours ==
Beijing Renhe

- Chinese FA Cup: 2013
- Chinese FA Super Cup: 2014

Guangzhou Evergrande

- Chinese Super League: 2017
- Chinese FA Super Cup: 2018

== Personal life ==
Zhang's younger brother Zhang Chengxiang, also a professional footballer, has played with him at Changsha Ginde (2007–2010) and Guizhou Renhe (2011–2014).
