= Li Xuepeng =

Chinese footballer

Li Xuepeng 李学鹏
Personal information
- Full name: Li Xuepeng
- Date of birth: 18 September 1988 (age 38)
- Place of birth: Dalian, Liaoning, China
- Height: 1.84 m (6 ft 0 in)
- Position: Left-back

Youth career
- 2004–2007: Dalian Shide

Senior career*
Years	Team	Apps	(Gls)
2007–2012	Dalian Shide	98	(3)
2007–2008	→ Citizen (loan)	1	(0)
2013–2014	Dalian Aerbin	34	(1)
2014–2022	Guangzhou FC	106	(0)
2023	Guangxi Pingguo Haliao	12	(0)
2025	Wenzhou FC	0	(0)

International career^{‡}
2010–2018	China	32	(0)
Medal record
Representing China
Men's football
EAFF Championship
Silver medal – second place	2013 South Korea	Team
Bronze medal – third place	2017 Japan	Team
AFC U-17 Championship
Gold medal – first place	2004 Japan	Team
- * Club domestic league appearances and goals as of 9 September 2022 ‡ National team caps and goals as of 20 July 2019

Li Xuepeng
- Simplified Chinese: 李学鹏
- Traditional Chinese: 李學鵬
Transcriptions
Standard Mandarin
- Hanyu Pinyin: Lǐ Xuépéng
- IPA: [lì ɕɥě pʰə̌ŋ]

Li Xuepeng (Chinese: 李学鹏; pinyin: Lǐ Xuépéng; born 18 September 1988) is a Chinese footballer who plays as a left back.

== Club career ==
Li Xuepeng started his football career when he was promoted to Dalian Shide's first team in the 2007 season. He made his debut for the club on 9 August 2007 in a 2–1 win against Qingdao Jonoon. Li scored his first goal for the club on 4 November 2007 in a 1–1 draw against Hangzhou Greentown. This led to a loan to First Division League side Citizen during the end of the 2007 season, making his debut for the club 2 December 2007 in a 3–0 loss against Happy Valley. Li would return to Dalian at the start of the 2008 season and play a significantly larger role at Dalian in a very disappointing season which saw the club flirt with relegation. At the start of the 2009 season, he would become a vital member of the squad due to his versatility to play in either the midfield or the defense, aiding Dalian to a midtable finish. Li lost his starting role for the club in the 2012 season and only played in three matches the entire season. In January 2013, Li transferred to Dalian Aerbin after Dalian Shide dissolved in the offseason.

On 10 June 2014, Li transferred to fellow Chinese Super League side Guangzhou Evergrande along with his teammate Yu Hanchao. He made his debut for the club on 27 July 2014 in a 1–0 win against Henan Jianye, coming on as a substitute for Liu Jian in the 70th minute. He was excluded from Guangzhou's squad after 23 June 2016 when manager Luiz Felipe Scolari stated that he would never use Li again during a press conference. This led to speculation that Li was looking for a transfer away from Guangzhou by the Chinese media. After several weeks, Li made his return to the first team on 9 August 2016 in a 0–0 draw against Beijing Guoan after reconciliation with Scolari.

On 28 December 2024, Li held the retirement game with his former teammates Feng Xiaoting and Rong Hao in Shandong Linyi Olympic Park.

In March 2025, Li was back to professional football by joining a China League Two club Wenzhou FC.

== International career ==
Li made his debut for the Chinese national team on 4 June 2010 in a 1–0 win against France, coming on as a substitute for Du Wei. He would then be called up to the squad that participated in the 2011 AFC Asian Cup where he played in a 2–2 draw against Uzbekistan.

== Personal life ==
Li Xuepeng is the son of former Chinese footballer Li Xicai.

== Career statistics ==
=== Club statistics ===
As of 9 September 2022.

Appearances and goals by club, season and competition
Club	Season	League			National Cup		League Cup		Continental		Other		Total	
Club	Season	Division	Apps	Goals	Apps	Goals	Apps	Goals	Apps	Goals	Apps	Goals	Apps	Goals
Dalian Shide	2007	Chinese Super League	5	1	-		-		-		-		5	1
Dalian Shide	2008	Chinese Super League	24	2	-		-		-		-		24	2
Dalian Shide	2009	Chinese Super League	23	0	-		-		-		-		23	0
Dalian Shide	2010	Chinese Super League	24	0	-		-		-		-		24	0
Dalian Shide	2011	Chinese Super League	19	0	0	0	-		-		-		19	0
Dalian Shide	2012	Chinese Super League	3	0	0	0	-		-		-		3	0
Dalian Shide	Total		98	3	0	0	0	0	0	0	0	0	98	3
Citizen (loan)	2007-08	First Division League	1	0	0	0	0	0	-		-		1	0
Dalian Aerbin	2013	Chinese Super League	23	1	4	0	-		-		-		27	1
Dalian Aerbin	2014	Chinese Super League	11	0	0	0	-		-		-		11	0
Dalian Aerbin	Total		34	1	4	0	0	0	0	0	0	0	38	1
Guangzhou Evergrande	2014	Chinese Super League	6	0	0	0	-		1	0	-		7	0
Guangzhou Evergrande	2015	Chinese Super League	13	0	0	0	-		8	0	3 (Note: One appearance in Chinese FA Super Cup, Two appearances in FIFA Club World Cup)	0	24	0
Guangzhou Evergrande	2016	Chinese Super League	12	0	4	0	-		5	0	1 (Note: Appearances in Chinese FA Super Cup)	0	22	0
Guangzhou Evergrande	2017	Chinese Super League	17	0	3	0	-		8	0	1	0	29	0
Guangzhou Evergrande	2018	Chinese Super League	27	0	0	0	-		8	0	1	0	36	0
Guangzhou Evergrande	2019	Chinese Super League	13	0	1	0	-		7	0	-		21	0
Guangzhou Evergrande	2020	Chinese Super League	3	0	0	0	-		0	0	-		3	0
Guangzhou Evergrande	2021	Chinese Super League	10	0	0	0	-		0	0	-		10	0
Guangzhou Evergrande	2022	Chinese Super League	5	0	0	0	-		0	0	-		5	0
Guangzhou Evergrande	Total		106	0	8	0	0	0	37	0	6	0	157	0
Career total			239	4	12	0	0	0	37	0	6	0	294	4

=== International statistics ===
National team
Year	Apps	Goals
2010	3	0
2011	6	0
2012	0	0
2013	3	0
2014	5	0
2015	0	0
2016	5	0
2017	5	0
2018	5	0
Total	32	0

== Honours ==
Guangzhou Evergrande

- Chinese Super League: 2014, 2015, 2016, 2017, 2019
- AFC Champions League: 2015
- Chinese FA Cup: 2016
- Chinese FA Super Cup: 2016, 2017, 2018

Individual

- Chinese Super League Team of the Year: 2018
