= Deng Hanwen =

Chinese footballer (born 1995)

Deng Hanwen 邓涵文
Personal information
- Full name: Deng Hanwen
- Date of birth: 8 January 1995 (age 31)
- Place of birth: Chongqing, Sichuan, China
- Height: 1.78 m (5 ft 10 in)
- Position: Right-back

Team information
- Current team: Yunnan Yukun
- Number: 25

Youth career
- 2009–2013: Guizhou Renhe
- 2011–2012: → Alverca (loan)
- 2013: → Real Massamá (loan)

Senior career*
Years	Team	Apps	(Gls)
2014–2016	Nei Mongol Zhongyou	68	(2)
2017	Beijing Renhe	25	(1)
2018–2021	Guangzhou FC	58	(3)
2022–2025	Wuhan Three Towns	101	(8)
2026–	Yunnan Yukun	13	(1)

International career^{‡}
2013–2014	China U-19	7	(0)
2016–2018	China U-23	21	(1)
2017–	China	15	(2)
Medal record
Representing China
Men's football
EAFF Championship
Bronze medal – third place	2017 Japan	Team
- * Club domestic league appearances and goals as of 19 November 2026 ‡ National team caps and goals as of 26 November 2023

Deng Hanwen
- Simplified Chinese: 邓涵文
- Traditional Chinese: 鄧涵文
Transcriptions
Standard Mandarin
- Hanyu Pinyin: Dèng Hánwén
- IPA: [tə̂ŋ xǎn wə̌n]

Deng Hanwen (Chinese: 邓涵文; pinyin: Dèng Hánwén; born 8 January 1995) is a Chinese footballer who plays as a right-back for Yunnan Yukun.

== Club career ==
Deng Hanwen started his football career when he joined Guizhou Renhe's youth academy in 2009. He was then loaned out to Alverca and Real Massamá for youth training as part of the Chinese Football Association's 500.com Stars Project between 2011 and 2013. He returned to China in 2013 for the 2013 National Games of China.

Deng transferred to China League Two side Taiyuan Zhongyou in the 2014 season. On 27 September 2014, he scored his first senior goal in a 1–1 away draw against Lijiang Jiayunhao in the 2014 China League Two play-offs. He scored one goal in 15 appearances as the club finished as runners-up and was promoted to the second tier, where the club changed its name to Nei Mongol Zhongyou. On 7 May 2016, he scored his first goal in the China League One in a 3–2 home win against Meizhou Hakka. After his promising performances in the 2016 season, Deng became the first national team player in club history when he was called up to the Chinese national team in December 2016.

Deng was linked with his hometown club Chongqing Lifan before the 2017 season; however, he eventually returned to fellow second tier side Beijing Renhe on 28 February 2017. He made his debut for the club on 11 March 2017 in a 2–2 home draw against Shanghai Shenxin. On 8 October 2017, he scored his first goal for the club in a 2–0 home win against Xinjiang Tianshan Leopard, sealing the club's promotion back to the top tier. During the 2017 season, Deng made 25 appearances and scored once in all competitions.

On 24 December 2017, Deng transferred to Chinese Super League side Guangzhou Evergrande. He made his debut for the club on 26 February 2018 in a 4–1 win against Shanghai Shenhua in the 2018 Chinese FA Super Cup. On 2 March 2018, he made his Super League debut in a 5–4 home loss against Guangzhou R&F. On 2 May 2018, in the fifth round of 2018 Chinese FA Cup against Guizhou Hengfeng, Deng failed to convert his kick in the penalty shootout, having his shot saved by Su Boyang as Guangzhou lost 4–1 in the penalty shootout. On 29 July 2018, Deng scored his first goal for the club in a 5–0 home win against Chongqing Lifan.

On 29 April 2022, he signed with newly promoted top tier side Wuhan Three Towns. He would go on to make his debut on 3 June 2022, in a league game against Hebei FC, which ended in a 4-0 victory. After the game he would go on to establish himself as a regular within the team that won the 2022 Chinese Super League title.On 5 December 2025, Deng updated his social media, formally bidding farewell to the club that he has played for over the past four years.

On 5 January 2026, Deng joined Yunnan Yukun.

== International career ==
Deng was called up to the Chinese national team for the first time by then manager Marcello Lippi in December 2016 for the 2017 China Cup. He made his international debut on 10 January 2017 in a 2–0 loss against Iceland during the China Cup. He assisted Wang Jingbin's late equalizer on 14 January 2016 in the third-place playoff against Croatia, which China won 5–4 in the penalty shootout. He scored his first and second goal for China on 7 June 2017 in an 8–1 win against the Philippines.

== Career statistics ==
=== Club ===
As of match played 31 December 2025

Appearances and goals by club, season and competition
Club	Season	League			National Cup		Continental		Other		Total	
Club	Season	Division	Apps	Goals	Apps	Goals	Apps	Goals	Apps	Goals	Apps	Goals
Nei Mongol Zhongyou	2014	China League Two	15	1	-		-		-		15	1
Nei Mongol Zhongyou	2015	China League One	27	0	2	0	-		-		29	0
Nei Mongol Zhongyou	2016	China League One	26	1	2	0	-		-		28	1
Nei Mongol Zhongyou	Total		68	2	4	0	0	0	0	0	72	2
Beijing Renhe	2017	China League One	25	1	0	0	-		-		25	1
Guangzhou Evergrande	2018	Chinese Super League	21	1	2	0	1	0	1 (Note: Appearances in Chinese FA Super Cup)	0	25	1
Guangzhou Evergrande	2019	Chinese Super League	14	0	2	0	4	0	-		20	0
Guangzhou Evergrande	2020	Chinese Super League	4	0	1	0	1	0	-		6	0
Guangzhou Evergrande	2021	Chinese Super League	19	2	0	0	0	0	-		19	2
Guangzhou Evergrande	Total		58	3	5	0	6	0	1	0	70	3
Wuhan Three Towns	2022	Chinese Super League	29	3	0	0	-		-		29	3
Wuhan Three Towns	2023	Chinese Super League	23	2	1	0	6	0	1	0	31	2
Wuhan Three Towns	2024	Chinese Super League	25	2	1	0	-		-		26	2
Wuhan Three Towns	2025	Chinese Super League	24	1	0	0	-		-		24	1
Wuhan Three Towns	Total		101	8	2	0	6	0	1	0	110	8
Career total			252	14	11	0	12	0	2	0	277	14

=== International ===
National team
Year	Apps	Goals
2017	7	2
2018	4	0
2019	0	0
2020	0	0
2021	0	0
2022	1	0
2023	3	0
Total	15	2

Scores and results list China's goal tally first.

No	Date	Venue	Opponent	Score	Result	Competition
1.	7 June 2017	Tianhe Stadium, Guangzhou, China	Philippines	7–1	8–1	Friendly international
2.	7 June 2017	Tianhe Stadium, Guangzhou, China	Philippines	8–1	8–1	Friendly international

== Honours ==
Guangzhou Evergrande

- Chinese Super League: 2019
- Chinese FA Super Cup: 2018

Wuhan Three Towns

- Chinese Super League: 2022
- Chinese FA Super Cup: 2023
