= Yu Hanchao =

Chinese footballer

Yu Hanchao 于汉超
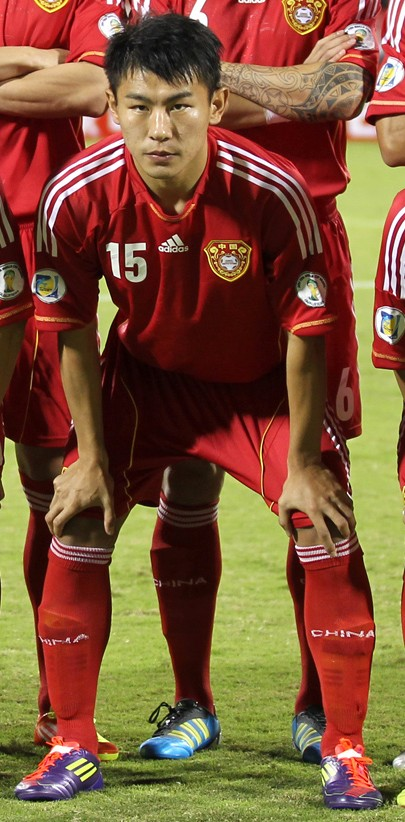

Personal information
- Full name: Yu Hanchao
- Date of birth: 25 February 1987 (age 39)
- Place of birth: Dalian, Liaoning, China
- Height: 1.78 m (5 ft 10 in)
- Position: Left winger

Team information
- Current team: Shanghai Shenhua (assistant coach)

Youth career
- 2001–2002: Dalian Yiteng
- 2003–2004: Liaoning Whowin

Senior career*
Years	Team	Apps	(Gls)
2005–2012	Liaoning Whowin	160	(33)
2013–2014	Dalian Aerbin	34	(8)
2014–2019	Guangzhou Evergrande	115	(26)
2020–2025	Shanghai Shenhua	124	(25)

International career^{‡}
2009–2019	China	59	(9)

Managerial career
- 2026–: China (assistant)
- 2026–: Shanghai Shenhua (assistant)
- * Club domestic league appearances and goals as of 26 November 2025 ‡ National team caps and goals as of 4 May 2019

Yu Hanchao
- Simplified Chinese: 于汉超
- Traditional Chinese: 于漢超
Transcriptions
Standard Mandarin
- Hanyu Pinyin: Yú Hànchāo
- IPA: [y̌ xân ʈʂʰáʊ]

Yu Hanchao (Chinese: 于汉超; pinyin: Yú Hànchāo; born 25 February 1987) is a Chinese football coach and former professional footballer who played as a right-footed left winger.

== Club career ==
=== Liaoning Whowin ===
Yu Hanchao started his football career with Liaoning Whowin in 2005 after making his debut on 22 May 2005 in a 0-0 draw against Inter Shanghai. By the end of the 2005 season, he played in 13 league games and scored his first goal on 5 November 2005 in a 4-1 loss against Shandong Luneng. The next season would see Yu establish himself further by playing in thirteen more games; however, it wasn't until the 2008 league season when he would cement his position as a regular within the squad. While he my have established himself within the team, he was unable to replicate his performances that saw him break into the squad and Liaoning were relegated at the end of the 2008 league season. Despite this setback, Yu would remain with the club and helped them back into the top tier when he won the second division title with the team. Liaoning ranked 3rd in the 2011 Chinese Super League under a limited budget and Yu won the division's domestic top goalscorer with 12 goals. Before the 2013 season started, Yu transferred to Dalian Aerbin for a then record-breaking domestic transfer fee.

=== Guangzhou Evergrande ===
On 10 June 2014, Yu transferred to fellow Chinese Super League club Guangzhou Evergrande along with his teammate Li Xuepeng. He made his debut for the club on 10 July 2014 in a 2-1 win against Shanghai Shenhua. On 9 August 2016, Yu was kneed in the back by Egor Krimets and had to be removed from the pitch on a stretcher in a 0-0 draw against Beijing Guoan. Hospital scans revealed that he had suffered a fractured vertebrae in his spine, ruling him out for three months. He made his return on 20 November 2016 in a 1-1 draw against Jiangsu Suning in the first leg of 2016 Chinese FA Cup final, coming on for Huang Bowen in the 69th minute.

On 14 April 2020, Yu was released by Guangzhou Evergrande Taobao after he violated the club rules for altering the number plate of his vehicle and was detained for 15 days.

=== Shanghai Shenhua ===
On 18 July 2020, Yu joined fellow Chinese Super League club Shanghai Shenhua on a free transfer. He made his debut for Shenhua on 25 July 2020 in a 2-0 defeat against his former club Guangzhou Evergrande in the opening league game of the 2020 season, which Shenhua lost 2-0. He scored his first goal for Shenhua on 27 October 2020 in a 3-1 win against Chongqing Dangdai Lifan.

On 28 July 2021, Yu missed a 94th-minute penalty against Wuhan FC, which could have won them the game that finished 0-0.

On 25 November 2023, Yu scored the winning goal in a 1-0 win against 3-time defending champions Shandong Taishan in the 2023 Chinese FA Cup final, it was his first major trophy with Shenhua and the club's 4th FA Cup win in history.

On 27 November 2025, after the Champions League Elite game, Shenhua head coach Slutsky announced that the game against Vissel Kobe would be Yu's final appearance of his career, he will be the coaching team member of the club's first team next year.

== International career ==
Yu was first called up to the Chinese national team in 2009 by then manager Gao Hongbo. He made his international debut on 29 May 2009 in a 1-1 draw against Germany, coming on as a substitute for Jiang Ning. On 26 June 2010, Yu scored his first two international goals in a 4-0 home win against Tajikistan in an international friendly.

== Career statistics ==
=== Club statistics ===
As of 26 November 2025

Appearances and goals by club, season and competition
Club	Season	League			National Cup		League Cup		Continental		Other		Total	
Club	Season	Division	Apps	Goals	Apps	Goals	Apps	Goals	Apps	Goals	Apps	Goals	Apps	Goals
Liaoning Whowin	2005	Chinese Super League	14	1	0	0	3	0	-		-		17	1
Liaoning Whowin	2006	Chinese Super League	13	0	1	0	-		-		-		14	0
Liaoning Whowin	2007	Chinese Super League	12	1	-		-		-		-		12	1
Liaoning Whowin	2008	Chinese Super League	26	0	-		-		-		-		26	0
Liaoning Whowin	2009	China League One	22	5	-		-		-		-		22	5
Liaoning Whowin	2010	Chinese Super League	25	7	-		-		-		-		25	7
Liaoning Whowin	2011	Chinese Super League	29	12	0	0	-		-		-		29	12
Liaoning Whowin	2012	Chinese Super League	19	7	4	2	-		-		-		23	9
Liaoning Whowin	Total		160	33	5	2	3	0	0	0	0	0	168	35
Dalian Aerbin	2013	Chinese Super League	20	3	2	0	-		-		-		22	3
Dalian Aerbin	2014	Chinese Super League	14	5	0	0	-		-		-		14	5
Dalian Aerbin	Total		34	8	2	0	0	0	0	0	0	0	36	8
Guangzhou Evergrande	2014	Chinese Super League	11	3	2	1	-		2	0	-		15	4
Guangzhou Evergrande	2015	Chinese Super League	23	7	0	0	-		12	0	4 (Note: One appearance in Chinese FA Super Cup, Three appearances in FIFA Club World Cup)	0	39	7
Guangzhou Evergrande	2016	Chinese Super League	19	3	6	1	-		6	0	1 (Note: Appearances in Chinese FA Super Cup)	0	32	4
Guangzhou Evergrande	2017	Chinese Super League	30	8	5	1	-		10	1	1	0	46	10
Guangzhou Evergrande	2018	Chinese Super League	26	5	0	0	-		8	0	1	0	35	5
Guangzhou Evergrande	2019	Chinese Super League	6	0	1	0	-		3	0	-		10	0
Guangzhou Evergrande	Total		115	26	14	3	0	0	41	1	7	0	177	30
Shanghai Shenhua	2020	Chinese Super League	16	1	0	0	-		6	3	-		22	4
Shanghai Shenhua	2021	Chinese Super League	19	2	6	2	-		-		-		25	4
Shanghai Shenhua	2022	Chinese Super League	17	5	0	0	-		-		-		17	5
Shanghai Shenhua	2023	Chinese Super League	27	6	5	3	-		-		-		32	9
Shanghai Shenhua	2024	Chinese Super League	25	5	3	0	-		8	1	1	0	37	6
Shanghai Shenhua	2025	Chinese Super League	20	6	3	2	-		3	0	1	1	27	9
Shanghai Shenhua	Total		124	25	17	7	0	0	17	4	2	1	160	37
Career total			433	92	38	12	3	0	58	5	9	1	541	110

=== International statistics ===
National team
Year	Apps	Goals
2009	3	0
2010	5	2
2011	9	2
2012	4	0
2013	5	0
2014	9	2
2015	8	2
2016	2	0
2017	5	1
2018	7	0
2019	2	0
Total	59	9

=== International goals ===
As of 7 June 2017
Scores and results list China's goal tally first.

No	Date	Venue	Opponent	Score	Result	Competition
1.	26 June 2010	Kunming Tuodong Sports Center, Kunming, China	Tajikistan	2–0	4–0	Friendly
2.	26 June 2010	Kunming Tuodong Sports Center, Kunming, China	Tajikistan	4–0	4–0	Friendly
3.	28 July 2011	New Laos National Stadium, Vientiane, Laos	Laos	2–0	6–1	2014 FIFA World Cup qualifier
4.	28 July 2011	New Laos National Stadium, Vientiane, Laos	Laos	5–1	6–1	2014 FIFA World Cup qualifier
5.	18 June 2014	Olympic Stadium, Shenyang, China	North Macedonia	1–0	2–0	Friendly
6.	4 September 2014	Anshan Sports Centre Stadium, Anshan, China	Kuwait	2–1	3–1	Friendly
7.	12 November 2015	Helong Stadium, Changsha, China	Bhutan	5–0	12–0	2018 FIFA World Cup qualifier
8.	12 November 2015	Helong Stadium, Changsha, China	Bhutan	10–0	12–0	2018 FIFA World Cup qualifier
9.	7 June 2017	Tianhe Stadium, Guangzhou, China	Philippines	3–1	8–1	Friendly

== Honours ==
Liaoning

- China League One: 2009

Guangzhou Evergrande

- Chinese Super League: 2014, 2015, 2016, 2017, 2019
- Chinese FA Cup: 2016
- Chinese FA Super Cup: 2016, 2017, 2018
- AFC Champions League: 2015

Shanghai Shenhua

- Chinese FA Cup: 2023
- Chinese FA Super Cup: 2024, 2025

Individual

- Chinese Super League Domestic Golden Boot winner: 2011
