= Huang Bowen =

Chinese footballer (born 1987)

Huang Bowen 黄博文
Personal information
- Date of birth: 13 July 1987 (age 39)
- Place of birth: Changsha, Hunan, China
- Height: 1.77 m (5 ft 10 in)
- Position: Midfielder

Team information
- Current team: Qingdao West Coast (assistant coach)

Youth career
- 2002–2003: Beijing Guoan

Senior career*
Years	Team	Apps	(Gls)
2004–2010	Beijing Guoan	103	(14)
2011–2012	Jeonbuk Hyundai Motors	29	(3)
2012–2022	Guangzhou FC	202	(9)
Total		334	(26)

International career
2008–2018	China	44	(3)

Managerial career
- 2022–2023: Guangzhou FC (assistant)
- 2025–2026: China U22 (assistant)
- 2026–: Qingdao West Coast (assistant)
Medal record
Representing China
Men's football
EAFF Championship
Gold medal – first place	2010 Japan	Team
Silver medal – second place	2013 South Korea	Team
- * Club domestic league appearances and goals

Huang Bowen
- Simplified Chinese: 黄博文
- Traditional Chinese: 黃博文
Transcriptions
Standard Mandarin
- Hanyu Pinyin: Huáng Bówén
- IPA: [xwǎŋ pwǒ wə̌n] (Note: In quick speech, [xwǎm-].)

Huang Bowen (Chinese: 黄博文; pinyin: Huáng Bówén; born 13 July 1987) is a Chinese football coach and former professional footballer who played as a midfielder.

== Club career ==
Huang Bowen started his football career with Beijing Guoan when he was promoted to the club's first team in the 2004 season. As a promising youngster, he made his debut for the club on 26 May 2004 in a 4–1 win against Shenyang Ginde that also saw Huang score his first goal, at the age of 16 years and 317 days, he held the record as the youngest ever goalscorer in top tier Chinese football for nearly 19 years, until it being broken by Shahsat Hujahmat in April 2023. By the end of his debut season, he'd played in six league games. Although these were often as a substitute, he would gradually start to establish himself within the senior team. In the subsequent seasons, he continued to make substitute appearances and gradually established himself as a regular for the club. It wasn't until the 2007 season that Huang started to establish himself as an integral member of the Beijing squad, helping them finish as runners-up in the league.

On 10 February 2011, Huang transferred to K-League side Jeonbuk Hyundai Motors. He made his debut for the club on 6 March 2011 in a 1–0 loss against Chunnam Dragons. This was followed by his first goal for the club in an AFC Champions League game on 6 March 2011 in a 4–0 win against Arema FC.

On 7 July 2012, Huang transferred to Chinese Super League side Guangzhou Evergrande. He was a vital part of Guangzhou's winning run in the 2013 AFC Champions League as the club became only the second Chinese side to win a continental title. On 13 August 2017, Huang suffered a lumbar fracture during a league match against Henan Jianye when he was knocked off balance by Ricardo Vaz Tê, which ruled him out for the rest of the season.

On 25 April 2023, Huang announced his retirement from professional football. In a heartfelt statement posted on social media, he thanked every club he has played for during his career and apologized to Beijing Guoan fans for not rejoining the club as promised when returning from South Korea.

=== Coaching career ===
On 16 February 2026, Huang was named as the assistant coach of Qingdao West Coast.

== International career ==
Huang made his debut for the Chinese national team on 25 May 2008 in a 2–0 win against Jordan. Despite his age and inexperience, then manager Vladimir Petrović let Huang play in a crucial 2010 FIFA World Cup qualification game with only one cap to his name in a 1–0 loss against Qatar, essentially knocking China out of qualification. While he did not take part any further in the remaining qualification games, he returned to the national team when he took part at the 2011 AFC Asian Cup qualification under caretaker Yin Tiesheng.

On 29 March 2016, Huang opened the scoring in a 2–0 home win against Qatar in the last game of the second round of the 2018 FIFA World Cup qualification (AFC). The goal was widely regarded as an iconic moment in Huang's career as well as Chinese football history, as the win saw China reach the final round of World Cup qualifying stages for the first time since 2001.

== Career statistics ==
=== Club ===
As of 4 November 2023

Appearances and goals by club, season and competition
Club	Season	League			National cup		League cup		Continental		Other		Total	
Club	Season	Division	Apps	Goals	Apps	Goals	Apps	Goals	Apps	Goals	Apps	Goals	Apps	Goals
Beijing Guoan	2004	Chinese Super League	6	1	0	0	0	0	–		–		6	1
Beijing Guoan	2005	Chinese Super League	5	0	3	0	4	0	–		–		12	0
Beijing Guoan	2006	Chinese Super League	5	1	1	0	–		–		–		6	1
Beijing Guoan	2007	Chinese Super League	22	1	–		–		–		–		22	1
Beijing Guoan	2008	Chinese Super League	29	7	–		–		6	0	–		35	7
Beijing Guoan	2009	Chinese Super League	17	3	–		–		4	0	–		21	3
Beijing Guoan	2010	Chinese Super League	19	1	–		–		7	0	–		26	1
Beijing Guoan	Total		103	14	4	0	4	0	17	0	0	0	128	14
Jeonbuk Hyundai Motors	2011	K-League	20	2	1	0	0	0	5	1	–		26	3
Jeonbuk Hyundai Motors	2012	K-League	9	1	0	0	0	0	3	1	–		12	2
Jeonbuk Hyundai Motors	Total		29	3	1	0	0	0	8	2	0	0	38	5
Guangzhou Evergrande	2012	Chinese Super League	9	1	3	0	–		1	1	–		13	2
Guangzhou Evergrande	2013	Chinese Super League	25	4	4	1	–		12	0	4 (Note: One appearance in Chinese FA Super Cup, three appearances in FIFA Club World Cup)	0	45	5
Guangzhou Evergrande	2014	Chinese Super League	27	1	1	0	–		10	1	0 (Note: Appearances in Chinese FA Super Cup)	0	38	2
Guangzhou Evergrande	2015	Chinese Super League	28	1	0	0	–		13	3	4	0	45	4
Guangzhou Evergrande	2016	Chinese Super League	28	1	7	1	–		6	0	1	0	42	2
Guangzhou Evergrande	2017	Chinese Super League	21	1	2	0	–		6	0	0	0	29	1
Guangzhou Evergrande	2018	Chinese Super League	20	0	0	0	–		7	1	1	1	28	2
Guangzhou Evergrande	2019	Chinese Super League	25	0	2	0	–		11	1	–		38	1
Guangzhou Evergrande	2020	Chinese Super League	8	0	0	0	–		2	0	–		10	0
Guangzhou Evergrande	2021	Chinese Super League	5	0	0	0	–		0	0	–		5	0
Guangzhou Evergrande	2022	Chinese Super League	6	0	0	0	–		0	0	–		6	0
Guangzhou Evergrande	Total		202	9	19	2	0	0	68	7	10	1	300	19
Career total			334	26	24	2	4	0	93	9	10	1	465	38

=== International ===
Appearances and goals by national team and year
National team	Year	Apps	Goals
China	2008	5	0
China	2009	7	1
China	2010	3	0
China	2011	9	1
China	2012	0	0
China	2013	4	0
China	2014	1	0
China	2015	2	0
China	2016	9	1
China	2017	3	0
China	2018	1	0
Total		44	3

As of 29 March 2016
Scores and results list China's goal tally first, score column indicates score after each Zhang goal.

List of international goals scored by Zhang Linpeng
No.	Date	Venue	Opponent	Score	Result	Competition
1	9 January 2009	Azadi Stadium, Tehran, Iran	Iran	1–2	1–3	Friendly
2	29 March 2011	Wuhan Sports Center Stadium, Wuhan, China	Honduras	1–0	3–0	Friendly
3	29 March 2016	Shaanxi Province Stadium, Xi'an, China	Qatar	1–0	2–0	2018 FIFA World Cup qualification

== Honours ==
Beijing Guoan

- Chinese Super League: 2009

Jeonbuk Hyundai Motors

- K-League: 2011

Guangzhou Evergrande

- Chinese Super League: 2012, 2013, 2014, 2015, 2016, 2017, 2019
- AFC Champions League: 2013, 2015
- Chinese FA Cup: 2012, 2016
- Chinese FA Super Cup: 2016, 2017, 2018

China

- East Asian Football Championship: 2010

Individual

- Chinese Football Association Young Player of the Year: 2008
- Chinese Super League Team of the Year: 2015
- AFC Champions League Dream Team: 2015
