= 2018 Chinese FA Super Cup =

Guangzhou Evergrande	Shanghai Shenhua
4	1
- Date: 26 February 2018
- Venue: Hongkou Football Stadium, Shanghai
- Man of the Match: (Brazil) Alan Carvalho
- Referee: Fu Ming
- Attendance: 23,998
- Weather: Clear / 9°C / 68% humidity

Weshare Wealth 2018 Chinese FA Super Cup (Chinese: 掌众财富2018中国足球协会超级杯) was the 16th Chinese FA Super Cup, an annual football match contested by the winners of the previous season's Chinese Super League and FA Cup competitions. It was held at Hongkou Football Stadium on 26 February 2018. The match was played between Guangzhou Evergrande Taobao, champions of the 2017 Chinese Super League, and Shanghai Greenland Shenhua, the winner of the 2017 Chinese FA Cup. Policy of foreign players and U-23 domestic players was executed for the first time in the tournament. At most three foreign players can play in the match while at least one domestic player who is under the age of 23 (born on or after 1 January 1995) must be in the starting eleven; The total number of foreign players must be no more than the total number of U-23 domestic players in the match.

Guangzhou Evergrande Taobao won the match 4–1 with goals from Huang Bowen, Alan Carvalho, Gao Lin and Ricardo Goulart, either side of a goal from Shenhua midfielder Fredy Guarín. This was Guangzhou Evergrande's fourth Chinese FA Super Cup title, breaking a tie with Shanghai Shenhua and Dalian Shide which had stood since Guangzhou Evergrande won their third title last year.

== Match ==
=== Details ===
26 February 2018
19:35

Guangzhou Evergrande Taobao	4–1	Shanghai Greenland Shenhua
Huang Bowen 26'; Alan 43'; Gao Lin 65'; Goulart 90+2' (pen.)	Report	Guarín 36'

Hongkou Football Stadium, Shanghai
Attendance: 23,998
Referee: Fu Ming (Beijing)

Guangzhou	Shanghai

GK	32	(China) Liu Dianzuo
RB	23	(China) Deng Hanwen (U-23)	(yellow card) 23'
CB	5	(China) Zhang Linpeng
CB	6	(China) Feng Xiaoting
LB	35	(China) Li Xuepeng
DM	8	(Serbia) Nemanja Gudelj
DM	16	(China) Huang Bowen		(substituted off) 74'
AM	11	(Brazil) Ricardo Goulart	(yellow card) 85'
RW	29	(China) Gao Lin (c)		(substituted off) 89'
LW	20	(China) Yu Hanchao	(yellow card) 45'	(substituted off) 68'
ST	7	(Brazil) Alan Carvalho
Substitutes:
GK	40	(China) Liu Shibo (U-23)
DF	21	(China) Zhang Chenglin
MF	4	(China) Xu Xin		(substituted on) 74'
MF	10	(China) Zheng Zhi
MF	15	(China) Zhang Wenzhao
MF	34	(China) Feng Boxuan (U-23)		(substituted on) 89'
FW	17	(China) Yang Liyu (U-23)		(substituted on) 68'
Manager:
(Italy) Fabio Cannavaro

GK	27	(China) Li Shuai
RB	16	(China) Li Yunqiu	(yellow card) 47'
CB	3	(China) Li Jianbin		(substituted off) 28'
CB	34	(China) Bi Jinhao		(substituted off) 46'
LB	32	(China) Aidi
RM	39	(China) Cong Zhen (U-23)
DM	26	(China) Qin Sheng
DM	13	(Colombia) Fredy Guarín		(substituted off) 76'
LM	7	(China) Mao Jianqing
AM	10	(Colombia) Giovanni Moreno (c)
ST	17	(Nigeria) Obafemi Martins
Substitutes:
GK	22	(China) Qiu Shengjiong
DF	19	(China) Li Xiaoming (U-23)		(substituted on) 46'
DF	25	(China) Wang Lin
DF	30	(China) Tao Jin
MF	8	(China) Zhang Lu		(substituted on) 28'
MF	36	(China) Liu Ruofan (U-23)		(substituted on) 76'
MF	37	(China) Sun Shilin
Manager:
(China) Wu Jingui

Man of the Match:
(Brazil) Alan Carvalho (Guangzhou Evergrande Taobao)
Assistant referees:
Huo Weiming (Beijing)
Cao Yi (Henan)
Fourth official:
Guan Xing (Beijing)

Match rules

- 90 minutes.
- Penalty shoot-out if scores level.
- Seven named substitutes.
- Maximum of three substitutions.
- Maximum of three foreign players on the pitch.
- At least one domestic U-23 player in the starting eleven.
- Total number of foreign players appeared must be no more than U-23 domestic players.

Chinese FA Super Cup
2018 Winners
Guangzhou Evergrande Taobao
Fourth title

=== Statistics ===
Statistic	Guangzhou Evergrande	Shanghai Shenhua
Goals scored	4	1
Possession	51%	49%
Shots	22	11
Shots on target	9	3
Passes / Pass completed	344 / 77%	305 / 67%
Corner kicks	8	5
Free kicks	16	24
Fouls	21	11
Offsides	3	6
Yellow cards	3	1
Red cards	0	0
Actual playing time	40:34	

== See also ==
- 2017 Chinese Super League
- 2017 Chinese FA Cup
