= 2014 Chinese FA Cup =

2014 Chinese Football Association Cup
CFA Cup

Tournament details
- Country: China
- Teams: 64

Final positions
- Champions: Shandong Luneng Taishan (5th title)
- Runners-up: Jiangsu Guoxin-Sainty
- AFC Champions League: Shandong Luneng Taishan

Tournament statistics
- Matches played: 66
- Goals scored: 178 (2.7 per match)
- Top goal scorer(s): (China) Xiao Zhi (5 goals)

Awards
- Best player: (Australia) Ryan McGowan

The Yanjing Beer 2014 Chinese FA Cup (Chinese: 燕京啤酒2014中国足球协会杯) was the 16th edition of Chinese FA Cup.

The cup title sponsor is Beijing Yanjing Brewery.

== Schedule ==
Round	Date	Matches	Clubs	New entries this round
Qualifying round	21–23 February 2014	18	14 → 8	14 Local amateur teams (selected by local FA)
First round	22–23 March 2014; 29–31 March 2014	16	8+12+12 → 16	12 China League Two teams (sign up and selected by FA); 12 2013 China Amateur Football League top 12 teams
Second round	15–16 April 2014	16	16+16 → 16	16 China League One teams
Third round	13–16 July 2014	16	16+16 → 16	16 Chinese Super League teams
Fourth round	23–24 July 2014	8	16 → 8	
Quarter-finals	6 August 2014	4	8 → 4	
Semi-finals	1 October 2014; 22–23 October 2014	4	4 → 2	
Final	9 November 2014; 22 November 2014	2	2 → 1	

== Qualifying rounds ==
=== Group A ===
Team	Pld	W	D	L	GF	GA	GD	Pts
Baotou Nanjiao	2	2	0	0	5	2	+3	6
Nanjing Cunin	2	1	0	1	5	3	+2	3
Guilin Tianlong	2	0	0	2	2	7	−5	0

21 February	Nanjing Cunin (A)	1 – 2	Baotou Nanjiao (A)	Mingjiang Training Base, Qingyuan
9:30

22 February	Guilin Tianlong (A)	1 – 4	Nanjing Cunin (A)	Mingjiang Training Base, Qingyuan
9:30

23 February	Guilin Tianlong (A)	1 – 3	Baotou Nanjiao (A)	Mingjiang Training Base, Qingyuan
9:30

=== Group B ===
Team	Pld	W	D	L	GF	GA	GD	Pts
Shenyang Wit	2	2	0	0	4	2	+2	6
Guangzhou Haoxin	2	1	0	1	3	3	0	3
Chengdu Hi-Tech Zhonghe United	2	0	0	2	2	4	−2	0

21 February	Shenyang Wit (A)	2 – 1	Guangzhou Haoxin (A)	Mingjiang Training Base, Qingyuan
14:30

22 February	Chengdu Hi-Tech Zhonghe United (A)	1 – 2	Guangzhou Haoxin (A)	Mingjiang Training Base, Qingyuan
14:30

23 February	Chengdu Hi-Tech Zhonghe United (A)	1 – 2	Shenyang Wit (A)	Mingjiang Training Base, Qingyuan
14:30

=== Group C ===
Team	Pld	W	D	L	GF	GA	GD	Pts
Dalian Longjuanfeng	3	2	1	0	3	0	+3	7
Zhaoqing Hengtai	3	2	0	1	9	3	+6	6
Xi'an Cailun	3	0	2	1	2	5	−3	2
Ningbo Yinbo	3	0	1	2	2	8	−6	1

21 February	Dalian Longjuanfeng (A)	1 – 0	Zhaoqing Hengtai (A)	Mingjiang Training Base, Qingyuan
9:30

21 February	Ningbo Yinbo (A)	1 – 1	Xi'an Cailun (A)	Mingjiang Training Base, Qingyuan
9:30

22 February	Dalian Longjuanfeng (A)	0 – 0	Xi'an Cailun (A)	Mingjiang Training Base, Qingyuan
9:30

22 February	Ningbo Yinbo (A)	1 – 5	Zhaoqing Hengtai (A)	Mingjiang Training Base, Qingyuan
9:30

23 February	Dalian Longjuanfeng (A)	2 – 0	Ningbo Yinbo (A)	Mingjiang Training Base, Qingyuan
9:30

23 February	Xi'an Cailun (A)	1 – 4	Zhaoqing Hengtai (A)	Mingjiang Training Base, Qingyuan
9:30

=== Group D ===
Team	Pld	W	D	L	GF	GA	GD	Pts
Qingdao Huanghai Zhiyao	3	3	0	0	15	2	+13	9
Dalianwan Qianguan	3	1	1	1	11	3	+8	4
Yangjiang Haiyuan	3	1	1	1	7	5	+2	4
Guigang Haoyu	3	0	0	3	0	23	−23	0

21 February	Guigang Haoyu (A)	0 – 5	Yangjiang Haiyuan (A)	Mingjiang Training Base, Qingyuan
14:30

21 February	Dalianwan Qianguan (A)	1 – 2	Qingdao Huanghai Zhiyao (A)	Mingjiang Training Base, Qingyuan
14:30

22 February	Guigang Haoyu (A)	0 – 9	Qingdao Huanghai Zhiyao (A)	Mingjiang Training Base, Qingyuan
14:30

22 February	Yangjiang Haiyuan (A)	1 – 1	Dalianwan Qianguan (A)	Mingjiang Training Base, Qingyuan
14:30

23 February	Guigang Haoyu (A)	0 – 9	Dalianwan Qianguan (A)	Mingjiang Training Base, Qingyuan
14:30

23 February	Qingdao Huanghai Zhiyao (A)	4 – 1	Yangjiang Haiyuan (A)	Mingjiang Training Base, Qingyuan
14:30

== First round ==
22 March	Shenyang Riverside Garden (A)	2 – 1	Henan Orient Classic (A)	Shenyang
14:00	Zhang Yue 22'; Jin Xianghao 35'		Yue Yang 84' (pen.)	Stadium: Tiexi Stadium

22 March	Dalianwan Qianguan (A)	3 – 1	Nanjing Cunin (A)	Dalian
15:00	Zhao Chen 5'; Wang Tong 13' (pen.); Xia Li 90'		Li Hao 21'	Stadium: Jinzhou Stadium; Attendance: 5,500

22 March	Zhaoqing Hengtai (A)	4 – 0	Guangzhou Haoxin (A)	Zhaoqing
15:00	Wu Haiqing 7' (pen.); Lin Zhaoming 21', 49', 87'			Stadium: Zhaoqing Sports Center; Attendance: 2,382

23 March	Shenyang Wit (A)	0 – 1	Wuhan Hongxing (A)	Shenyang
14:00			Chen Hao 11'	Stadium: Shenyang Urban Construction College Stadium

23 March	Dalian Longjuanfeng (A)	1 – 1 (0 – 2 p)	Hangzhou Zhipu (A)	Dalian
15:00	Li Yuankun 82'		Wang Xin 9'	Stadium: Jinzhou Stadium
	Penalties
	Penalty missed		Penalty missed Penalty scored

29 March	Shenyang Dongjin (3)	1 – 0	Hubei Huachuang (A)	Shenyang
14:30	Chen Chengye ?'			Stadium: Shenyang Urban Construction Colloge Stadium

29 March	Baotou Nanjiao (A)	1 – 3	Guizhou Zhicheng (3)	Baotou
15:00	Wang Yewen 23'		Pang Zhiquan 46', 54'; Liu Teng 77'	Stadium: Baotou Olympic Sports Center; Attendance: 22,342

29 March	Meixian Juncheng Hakka (3)	2 – 0	Wuhan Dongfeng Honda (A)	Meizhou
15:00	Luo Tian 9'; Li Zhengyu 61'			Stadium: Meixian Tsang Hin-chi Stadium; Attendance: 4,832

29 March	Dalian Taian Old Brothers (A)	0 – 1	Suzhou Jinfu (A)	Dalian
15:00			Pan Dongdong 85'	Stadium: Jinzhou Stadium

29 March	Yinchuan Helanshan (3)	1 – 2	Qingdao Kunpeng (A)	Yinchuan
15:30	Men Yang 20' (pen.)		Tian Yong ?', 87'	Stadium: Lanshan Park

30 March	Dalian Transcendence (3)	3 – 0	Guangxi Liuzhou Liuyue (A)	Dalian
15:00	Su Di 65'; Wang Renlong 72'; Du Wenxiang 77'			Stadium: Jinzhou Stadium

30 March	Qingdao Huanghai Zhiyao (A)	0 – 1	Sichuan Leaders (3)	Qingdao
15:00			Du Jinlong 35'	Stadium: Tiantai Stadium

30 March	Lijiang Jiayunhao (3)	2 – 0	Hebei Elite (A)	Lijiang
15:00	Huang Da 53'; Wen Shuo 54'			Stadium: Lijiang Sports Development Center

30 March	Jiangxi Liansheng (3)	3 – 0	Shandong Tengding (3)	Nanchang
15:00	?'; Wang Yunlong ?'; Li Gang ?'			Stadium: Jiangxi Olympic Sports Center

30 March	Tianjin Huochetou (3)	1 – 1 (4 – 3 p)	Zibo Sunday (A)	Tianjin
15:00	?'		Fang Genxie ?'	Stadium: Tianjin Huochetou Stadium

31 March	Shanghai Jiading Boo King (A)	0 – 1	Meizhou Kejia (3)	Shanghai
15:00			Shi Liang 40'	Stadium: Jiading Stadium; Attendance: 864

== Second round ==
15 April	Dalianwan Qianguan (A)	2 – 3	Qingdao Hainiu (2)	Dalian
14:00	Xia Deqiang 18', 74' (pen.)		Liu Qing 7', 39', 65' (pen.)	Stadium: Jinzhou Stadium; Referee: Li Haihe

15 April	Shenyang Dongjin (3)	0 – 4	Beijing Institute of Technology (2)	Shenyang
14:30			Wang Wei 15'; Hu Ming 20', 51'; Lu Bin 32'	Stadium: Shenyang Urban Construction Colloge Stadium; Referee: Shi Zhenlu

15 April	Qingdao Kunpeng (A)	0 – 2	Guangdong Sunray Cave (2)	Qingdao
15:00			Liu Tao 60'; Cui Ning 90'	Stadium: Hongcheng Stadium; Referee: Guo Hao

15 April	Zhaoqing Hengtai (A)	0 – 0 (2 – 4 p)	Hunan Billows (2)	Zhaoqing
15:00				Stadium: Zhaoqing Sports Center; Attendance: 2,138; Referee: Dai Yige
	Penalties
	Penalty scored Penalty missed		(penalty scored) Mao Jiakang; (penalty scored) Liu Shuai; (penalty scored) Liu Xinyu; (penalty scored) Liu Bo

15 April	Suzhou Jinfu (A)	2 – 2 (4 – 3 p)	Beijing Baxy (2)	Kunshan
15:00	Song Yue 23' (pen.); Sun Hong 57'		Jin Hui 46', 89'	Stadium: Kunshan Sports Center; Referee: Yang Nan
	Penalties
	Penalty missed Penalty scored		Penalty scored Penalty missed

15 April	Dalian Transcendence (3)	1 – 1 (3 – 4 p)	Tianjin Songjiang (2)	Dalian
19:00	Han Jiabao 23' (pen.)		Wu Lei 45' (pen.)	Stadium: Jiuzhou Stadium; Referee: Zhang Miao
	Penalties
	Penalty missed Penalty scored		Penalty scored

16 April	Shenyang Riverside Garden (A)	0 – 6	Shenyang Zhongze (2)	Shenyang
14:30			Liu Le 7'; Tian Yinong 40'; Guo Zihao 55'; Yang Zi 65', 68'; Hao Yonghe ?'	Stadium: Shenyang Urban Construction Colloge Stadium; Referee: Sun Lei

16 April	Guizhou Zhicheng (3)	2 – 0	Hebei Zhongji (2)	Guiyang
15:00	Yang Jian 9' (pen.); Li Yingjian ?'			Stadium: Guiyang Olympic Sports Center; Referee: He Xiaohu

16 April	Wuhan Hongxing (A)	1 – 0	Wuhan Zall (2)	Wuhan
15:00	Chen Hao 50' (pen.)			Stadium: Hankou Cultural Sports Centre; Referee: Liu Lin

16 April	Sichuan Leaders (3)	0 – 3	Qingdao Jonoon (2)	Dujiangyan
15:00			Zhu Jianrong 16', 63'; Zhu Shiyu 43'	Stadium: Dujiangyan Stadium; Referee: Zhang Long

16 April	Lijiang Jiayunhao (3)	2 – 1	Chengdu Tiancheng (2)	Lijiang
15:00	Gao Furong 22'; Zhang Shuang ?'		Wang Hanlin 90' (pen.)	Stadium: Lijiang Sports Development Center; Referee: Jia Zhiliang

16 April	Jiangxi Liansheng (3)	0 – 1	Yanbian Baekdu (2)	Nanchang
15:00			Li Haojie 38'	Stadium: Jiangxi Olympic Sports Center; Referee: Ma Ye

16 April	Tianjin Huochetou (3)	0 – 2	Chongqing Lifan (2)	Tianjin
15:00			Luo Xin 12'; Cheng Mouyi 20'	Stadium: Tianjin Huochetou Stadium

16 April	Meizhou Kejia (3)	4 – 0	Shijiazhuang Yongchang (2)	Wuhua
15:30	Sun Yifan 18'; Pan Jia 41' (pen.); 57' (o.g.); Jiang Zhongxiao 81'			Stadium: Wuhua Stadium; Referee: Shen Yinhao

16 April	Meixian Juncheng Hakka (3)	1 – 1 (2 – 4 p)	Shenzhen Neo Capital Ruby (2)	Meizhou
19:30	Li Zhengyu 65'		Yu Le 60'	Stadium: Meixian Tsang Hin-chi Stadium; Attendance: 8,232; Referee: Chen Xin
	Penalties
	Penalty scored Penalty missed		Penalty scored Penalty missed

16 April	Hangzhou Zhipu (A)	3 – 2	Xinjiang Tianshan Leopard (2)	Hangzhou
19:30	Zhang Weijun 21'; Wang Xin 47', 65'		Liu Shun 6'; Qi Yunfei 80'	Stadium: Jianggan Sports Center; Referee: Li Haixin

== Third round ==
13 July	Guizhou Zhicheng (3)	1 – 3	Guangzhou R&F (1)	Liupanshui
20:00	Li Yingjian 75'		Xu Bo 41'; Zhang Shuo 45'; Zhu Baojie 57'	Stadium: Liangdu Sports Center; Attendance: 17,503; Referee: He Xiaohu

15 July	Beijing Institute of Technology (2)	2 – 2 (4 – 5 p)	Hangzhou Greentown (1)	Beijing
15:00	Li Xiang 30'; Meng Yang 72'		Ruan Yang 15'; Yi Baidi 58'	Stadium: BIT Eastern Athletic Field; Attendance: 2,010; Referee: Liu Lin
	Penalties
	Meng Yang (penalty scored); Nazario (penalty missed); Li Xiang (penalty scored); Li Xiangbin (penalty scored); Han Guanghui (penalty scored)		(penalty scored) Shi Ke; (penalty scored) Zhuang Jiajie; (penalty scored) Luo Jing; (penalty scored) Dong Yu; (penalty scored) Zhao Yuhao

15 July	Yanbian Baekdu (2)	2 – 0	Dalian Aerbin (1)	Yanji
15:30	Roland 19' (pen.), 77'			Stadium: Yanji Nationwide Fitness Centre Stadium; Attendance: 2,337; Referee: Wang Zhe

15 July	Shenzhen Neo Capital Ruby (2)	0 – 5	Shandong Luneng Taishan (1)	Shenzhen
16:00			Zhang Wenzhao 2'; Aloísio 30'; Liu Binbin 69'; Lü Zheng 75', 88'	Stadium: Bao'an Stadium; Attendance: 3,320; Referee: Zhou Gang

15 July	Meizhou Kejia (3)	1 – 2	Shanghai Shenxin (1)	Wuhua
16:00	Peng Xinli 5'		Liu Junnan 10'; Zou Zhongting 14'	Stadium: Wuhua Stadium; Attendance: 5,108; Referee: Xia Jun

15 July	Shenyang Zhongze (2)	0 – 1	Beijing Guoan (1)	Shenyang
19:30			Batalla 34'	Stadium: Tiexi New District Sports Center; Attendance: 2,060; Referee: Shi Zhenlu

15 July	Chongqing Lifan (2)	0 – 3	Shanghai Greenland Shenhua (1)	Chongqing
19:30			Viatri 66', 70'; Gao Di 86'	Stadium: Fuling Stadium; Attendance: 8,118; Referee: Wang Jin

15 July	Qingdao Hainiu (2)	4 – 1	Tianjin Teda (1)	Qingdao
19:30	Herman 9' (pen.); Wang Xuanhong 31'; Qu Bo 56'; Voskoboinikov 90+3'		Valencia 82'	Stadium: Guoxin Stadium; Attendance: 5,782; Referee: Li Haihe

15 July	Hunan Billows (2)	1 – 2	Jiangsu Guoxin-Sainty (1)	Yiyang
19:30	Damjanović 52'		Sun Ke 35'; Deng Zhuoxiang 45'	Stadium: Yiyang Stadium; Attendance: 1,432; Referee: Xing Qi

15 July	Tianjin Songjiang (2)	0 – 2	Guizhou Renhe (1)	Tianjin
19:30			Yang Yihu 39'; Misimović 70'	Stadium: Tuanbo Football Stadium; Attendance: 1,028; Referee: Zhang Miao

15 July	Guangzhou Evergrande (1)	1 – 0	Guangdong Sunray Cave (2)	Guangzhou
20:00	Yu Hanchao 68'			Stadium: Tianhe Stadium; Attendance: 37,641; Referee: Wang Jing

16 July	Qingdao Jonoon (2)	3 – 2	Changchun Yatai (1)	Qingdao
15:30	Quan Lei 32'; Wang Wei 47'; Dănălache 70'		Jiang Zhe 85'; Yan Shipeng 89'	Stadium: Tiantai Stadium; Attendance: 2,113; Referee: Guo Hao

16 July	Lijiang Jiayunhao (3)	0 – 0 (5 - 3 p)	Harbin Yiteng (1)	Lijiang
16:00				Stadium: Lijiang Sports Development Center
	Penalties
	Wang Fan (penalty scored); Wang Kun (penalty scored); Hui Ge (penalty scored); Shi Yong (penalty scored); Ha Zhaotong (penalty scored)		(penalty scored) (penalty scored) (penalty scored); (penalty missed) Li Jiahe

16 July	Wuhan Hongxing (A)	0 – 0 (4 - 3 p)	Shanghai East Asia (1)	Wuhan
16:30				Stadium: Hankou Cultural Sports Centre; Attendance: 7,133; Referee: Lin Jun
	Penalties
	Hu Hao (penalty scored); Chen Hao (penalty missed); Huang Lei (penalty scored); Hu Xi (penalty scored); Rao Yao (penalty scored)		(penalty scored) Lin Chuangyi; (penalty missed) Zhang Yi; (penalty scored) Wang Jiajie; (penalty missed) Li Shenglong; (penalty scored) Li Haowen

16 July	Suzhou Jinfu (A)	0 – 0 (4 - 2 p)	Liaoning Whowin (1)	Kunshan
19:00				Stadium: Kunshan Sports Center; Attendance: 3,000; Referee: Zhang Cheng
	Penalties
	Wu Hongyang (penalty scored); Sun Hong (penalty scored); Gu Xiaowei (penalty scored); Yu Zengpin (penalty scored)		(penalty scored) Zhao Junzhe; (penalty missed) Wang Liang; (penalty missed) Zhang Ye; (penalty scored) Zhang Lu

16 July	Hangzhou Zhipu (A)	0 – 4	Henan Jianye (1)	Hangzhou
19:35			Xiao Zhi 15', 62', 75'; Zhang Lu 30'	Stadium: Yellow Dragon Sports Center; Attendance: 1,081; Referee: Tang Kun

== Fourth round ==
23 July	Qingdao Jonoon (2)	0 – 0 (4 – 3 p)	Hangzhou Greentown (1)	Qingdao
15:30				Stadium: Tiantai Stadium; Attendance: 1,688; Referee: Xu Fuxin
	Penalties
	Dănălache (penalty scored); Castillo (penalty missed); Mao Jianqing (penalty scored); Liu Zhenli (penalty scored); Song Wenjie (penalty scored)		(penalty missed) Zhao Yuhao; (penalty scored) Zhuang Jiajie; (penalty scored) Luo Jing; (penalty scored) Chen Zhongliu; (penalty missed) Feng Gang

23 July	Yanbian Baekdu (2)	1 – 2	Shanghai Greenland Shenhua (1)	Yanji
15:30	Li Chenglin 65'		Moreno 25'; Wang Fei 71'	Stadium: Yanji Nationwide Fitness Centre Stadium; Attendance: 3,451; Referee: Fan Qi

23 July	Lijiang Jiayunhao (3)	1 – 2	Jiangsu Guoxin-Sainty (1)	Lijiang
16:00	Wang Xiaolong 89'		Tao Yuan 23'; Sun Ke 59'	Stadium: Lijiang Sports Development Center; Attendance: 8,346; Referee: Zhang Long

23 July	Guizhou Moutai (1)	0 – 3	Beijing Guoan (1)	Guiyang
19:30			Damjanović 26'; Shao Jiayi 50'; Zhang Xizhe 68' (pen.)	Stadium: Guiyang Olympic Sports Center; Attendance: 8,671; Referee: Fu Ming

23 July	Guangzhou R&F (1)	0 – 1	Shandong Luneng Taishan (1)	Guangzhou
20:00			Aloísio 60'	Stadium: Yuexiushan Stadium; Attendance: 8,973; Referee: Wang Zhe

24 July	Wuhan Hongxing (A)	2 – 2 (5 – 6 p)	Qingdao Hainiu (2)	Wuhan
16:05	Chen Hao 53'; Huang Lei 63'		Shewket Yalqun 7'; Ma Long 18'	Stadium: Hankou Cultural Sports Centre; Attendance: 6,135; Referee: Xia Jun
	Penalties
	Chen Hao (penalty scored); Huang Lei (penalty scored); Hu Hao (penalty scored); Deng Sheng (penalty scored); Rao Yao (penalty scored); Li Dongxu (penalty missed)		(penalty scored) Qu Bo; (penalty scored) Ma Long; (penalty scored) Zhang Hongnan; (penalty scored) Liu Qing; (penalty scored) Wang Jian; (penalty scored) Chen Long

24 July	Suzhou Jinfu (A)	1 – 2	Shanghai Shenxin (1)	Kunshan
19:30	Yu Zengpin 44'		Yang Jiawei 71'; Wang Yun 75'	Stadium: Kunshan Sports Center; Attendance: 5,500; Referee: Zhou Gang

24 July	Henan Jianye (1)	2 – 1	Guangzhou Evergrande (1)	Zhengzhou
20:00	Xiao Zhi 75', 89'		Gilardino 23'	Stadium: Hanghai Stadium; Attendance: 17,357; Referee: Guo Hao

== Fifth Round ==
6 August	Qingdao Jonoon (2)	1 – 2	Jiangsu Guoxin-Sainty (1)	Qingdao
15:30	Wang Wei 17'		Elias 36' (pen.); Li Ang 42'	Stadium: Tiantai Stadium; Attendance: 3,781; Referee: Shi Zhenlu

6 August	Beijing Guoan (1)	1 – 1 (3 – 5 p)	Shandong Luneng Taishan (1)	Beijing
19:30	Fejzullahu 34'		Aloísio 75'	Stadium: Workers Stadium; Attendance: 43,878; Referee: Wang Jin
	Penalties
	Zhang Xizhe (penalty scored); Matić (penalty scored); Shao Jiayi (penalty scored); Xu Yunlong (penalty missed)		(penalty scored) Aloísio; (penalty scored) Júnior Urso; (penalty scored) McGowan; (penalty scored) Zhang Wenzhao; (penalty scored) Vágner Love

6 August	Qingdao Hainiu (2)	1 – 1 (5 – 4 p)	Henan Jianye (1)	Qingdao
19:30	Wang Xuanhong 31'		Zhang Li 54'	Stadium: Guoxin Stadium; Attendance: 5,677; Referee: Li Jun
	Penalties
	Herman (penalty scored); Qu Bo (penalty scored); Ma Long (penalty scored); Chen Long (penalty scored); Wang Jian (penalty scored)		(penalty missed) Huang Xiyang; (penalty scored) Yin Hongbo; (penalty scored) Abduwali Ablet; (penalty scored) Lee Ji-Nam; (penalty scored) Sankoh

6 August	Shanghai Greenland Shenhua (1)	4 – 2	Shanghai Shenxin (1)	Shanghai
19:45	Moreno 35', 81'; Henrique 50', 60'		Utaka 7', 66'	Stadium: Hongkou Football Stadium; Attendance: 11,753; Referee: Wang Zhe

== Semifinal ==
=== 1st leg ===
1 October	Shandong Luneng Taishan (1)	3 – 0	Qingdao Hainiu (2)	Jinan
19:30	Liu Binbin 11'; Aloísio 47'; Han Peng 90+3'			Stadium: Jinan Olympic Sports Center Stadium; Attendance: 23,678; Referee: Tan Hai

1 October	Shanghai Greenland Shenhua (1)	0 – 2	Jiangsu Guoxin-Sainty (1)	Shanghai
19:45			Wu Xi 40'; Sun Ke 41'	Stadium: Hongkou Football Stadium; Attendance: 16,258; Referee: Wang Jin

=== 2nd leg ===
22 October	Qingdao Hainiu (2)	0 – 3	Shandong Luneng Taishan (1)	Qingdao
19:00			Vagner Love 51'; Zhang Wenzhao 89', 90+3'	Stadium: Guoxin Stadium; Attendance: 11,289; Referee: Guo Hao

Shandong Luneng Taishan won 6–0 on aggregate.

23 October	Jiangsu Guoxin-Sainty (1)	3 – 0	Shanghai Greenland Shenhua (1)	Nanjing
19:35	Sun Ke 58'; Wu Xi 84'; Toloza 90'			Stadium: Nanjing Olympic Sports Center; Attendance: 32,643; Referee: Shi Zhenlu

Jiangsu Guoxin-Sainty won 5–0 on aggregate.

== Final ==
November 9
15:35

Shandong Luneng Taishan (1)	4 – 2	Jiangsu Guoxin-Sainty (1)
Vagner Love 27', 61' (pen.), 70' (pen.); Júnior Urso 53'		Ji Xiang 14'; Wu Xi 73'

Jinan Olympic Sports Center Stadium, Jinan
Attendance: 31,427
Referee: Shaun Evans (Australia)

Shandong Luneng Taishan	Jiangsu Guoxin-Sainty

Shandong:
GK	25	(China) Wang Dalei (c)
RB	19	(China) Zhang Chi
CB	4	(Australia) Ryan McGowan
CB	6	(China) Zhao Mingjian
LB	16	(China) Zheng Zheng
DM	15	(Brazil) Júnior Urso	(yellow card) 85'
DM	23	(China) Li Wei
AM	30	(Argentina) Walter Montillo
LW	21	(China) Liu Binbin		(substituted off) 90'
RW	13	(China) Zhang Wenzhao		(substituted off) 83'
CF	10	(Brazil) Vágner Love		(substituted off) 87'
Substitutes:
GK	1	(China) Yang Cheng
DF	11	(China) Wang Tong
MF	8	(China) Wang Yongpo
MF	17	(China) Wu Xinghan
MF	28	(China) Hao Junmin		(substituted on) 83'
FW	9	(China) Han Peng		(substituted on) 90'
FW	31	(Brazil) Aloísio		(substituted on) 87'
Coach:
(Brazil) Cuca

Jiangsu:
GK	1	(China) Deng Xiaofei
CB	2	(China) Li Ang
CB	3	(Brazil) Eleílson	(yellow card) 58'
CB	6	(Lebanon) Roda Antar (c)
LWB	23	(China) Ren Hang	(yellow card) 60'
RWB	24	(China) Ji Xiang	(yellow card) 37'
DM	37	(China) Yang Hao
AM	22	(China) Wu Xi	(yellow card) 68'
LW	28	(China) Yang Xiaotian	(yellow card) 90+1'
RW	20	(China) Sun Ke		(substituted off) 82'
CF	11	(Brazil) Elias		(substituted off) 72'
Substitutes:
GK	26	(China) Guan Zhen
DF	5	(China) Zhou Yun
DF	30	(South Korea) Yoon Sin-Young
MF	8	(China) Liu Jianye		(substituted on) 82'
MF	12	(China) Zhang Xiaobin
MF	16	(China) Deng Zhuoxiang
FW	40	(Colombia) Edinson Toloza		(substituted on) 72'
Coach:
(China) Gao Hongbo

Assistant referees:
Huo Weiming
Mu Yuxin
Fourth official:
Tan Hai

November 22
15:00

Jiangsu Guoxin-Sainty (1)	2 – 1	Shandong Luneng Taishan (1)
Antar 12'; Eleílson 60'		McGowan 90+5'

Nanjing Olympic Sports Center, Nanjing
Attendance: 51,262
Referee: Alan Milliner (Australia)

Jiangsu Guoxin-Sainty	Shandong Luneng Taishan

Jiangsu:
GK	1	(China) Deng Xiaofei
RB	24	(China) Ji Xiang
CB	2	(China) Li Ang	(yellow card) 25'
CB	30	(South Korea) Yoon Sin-Young
LB	23	(China) Ren Hang
DM	8	(China) Liu Jianye (c)	(yellow card) 19'	(substituted off) 64'
DM	37	(China) Yang Hao		(substituted off) 77'
AM	6	(Lebanon) Roda Antar
LW	28	(China) Yang Xiaotian
RW	20	(China) Sun Ke	(yellow card) 37' (yellow-red card) 90+3'
CF	3	(Brazil) Eleílson
Substitutes:
GK	26	(China) Guan Zhen
MF	9	(China) Lu Bofei
MF	12	(China) Zhang Xiaobin
MF	13	(China) Tao Yuan		(substituted on) 77'
MF	16	(China) Deng Zhuoxiang
FW	11	(Brazil) Elias		(substituted on) 64'
FW	40	(Colombia) Edinson Toloza
Coach:
(China) Gao Hongbo

Shandong:
GK	25	(China) Wang Dalei (c)
RB	19	(China) Zhang Chi
CB	4	(Australia) Ryan McGowan
CB	6	(China) Zhao Mingjian
LB	16	(China) Zheng Zheng	(yellow card) 49'
DM	15	(Brazil) Júnior Urso	(yellow card) 74'	(substituted off) 78'
DM	23	(China) Li Wei		(substituted off) 61'
AM	30	(Argentina) Walter Montillo
LW	21	(China) Liu Binbin
RW	28	(China) Hao Junmin		(substituted off) 46'
CF	10	(Brazil) Vágner Love
Substitutes:
GK	1	(China) Yang Cheng
DF	5	(China) Wang Qiang
MF	8	(China) Wang Yongpo
MF	13	(China) Zhang Wenzhao		(substituted on) 46'
MF	33	(China) Jin Jingdao
FW	9	(China) Han Peng		(substituted on) 61'
FW	31	(Brazil) Aloísio		(substituted on) 78'
Coach:
(Brazil) Cuca

Assistant referees:
A Lamusi
Wang Dexin
Fourth official:
Wang Zhe

Shandong Luneng Taishan won 5–4 on aggregate.

== Awards ==
- Top Scorer: (China) Xiao Zhi (Henan Jianye) (5 goals)
- Most Valuable Player: (Australia) Ryan McGowan (Shandong Luneng Taishan)
- Best Coach: (Romania) Dan Petrescu
- Fair Play Award: Qingdao Hainiu
- Dark Horse Award: Wuhan Hongxing

== Top scorers ==
Rank	Player	Club	Goals
1	(China) Xiao Zhi	Henan Jianye	5
2	(Brazil) Aloísio	Shandong Luneng Taishan	4
2	(China) Sun Ke	Jiangsu Guoxin-Sainty	4
2	(Brazil) Vágner Love	Shandong Luneng Taishan	4
5	(China) Liu Qing	Qingdao Hainiu	3
5	(China) Wang Xin	Hangzhou Zhipu	3
5	(China) Lin Zhaoming	Zhaoqing Hengtai	3
5	(China) Chen Hao	Wuhan Hongxing	3
5	(China) Zhang Wenzhao	Shandong Luneng Taishan	3
5	(Colombia) Giovanni Moreno	SShanghai Greenland Shenhua	3
5	(China) Wu Xi	Jiangsu Guoxin-Sainty	3
