= Zhang Chi (footballer) =

Chinese footballer

Zhang Chi 张弛
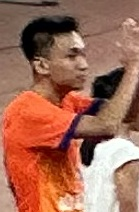
- Zhang Chi in August 2024

Personal information
- Full name: Zhang Chi
- Date of birth: July 8, 1987 (age 39)
- Place of birth: Jinan, Shandong, China
- Height: 1.82 m (6 ft 0 in)
- Positions: Midfielder; right-back

Youth career
- 1999–2007: Shandong Luneng

Senior career*
Years	Team	Apps	(Gls)
2008–2025	Shandong Taishan	175	(7)
2025	→ Qingdao Hainiu (loan)	8	(0)
Total		183	(7)
- * Club domestic league appearances and goals

Zhang Chi (simplified Chinese: 张弛; traditional Chinese: 張弛; pinyin: Zhāng Chí; born 8 July 1987 in Jinan, Shandong) is a Chinese retired footballer who mainly played as a midfielder or right-back for Shandong Taishan.

== Club career ==
Zhang Chi is a graduate of the Shandong Luneng under-19 youth team before he received his promotion to the senior team in 2008, however despite not playing a game throughout the season, he was included in the squad that won the league title. Zhang Chi wouldn't go on to make his debut for Shandong until July 19, 2010, when he came on as a substitute in a league game against Nanchang Hengyuan in a 1–0 victory. This would be followed by his first start for the team on July 28, 2010, in a league game against Shanghai Shenhua, which Shandong won 2–1. These performances would impress the Head coach Branko Ivanković and he would start to establish himself as a regular within the team that went on to win the 2010 Chinese Super League title.

Zhang Chi's progression as a player would be halted when on April 1, 2011, in a league game against Chengdu Blades he would break his left ankle in a collision with Chengdu player Li Gang. That injury would see Zhang Chi miss out on three years of football before he was able to make his comeback and make his return to the field on May 22, 2014, in a league game against Guangzhou R&F that Shandong won 3–1. He would gradually establish himself as a regular once more within the team and go on gain his third league title with the club when he was part of the team that won the 2021 Chinese Super League title.

On 21 July 2025, Zhang was loaned out to Qingdao Hainiu.

After the 2025 season, Zhang officially retired from professional football on 14 March 2026.

== Career statistics ==
As of 22 November 2025.

Appearances and goals by club, season and competition
Club	Season	League			National Cup		Continental		Other		Total	
Club	Season	Division	Apps	Goals	Apps	Goals	Apps	Goals	Apps	Goals	Apps	Goals
Shandong Luneng/ Shandong Taishan	2008	Chinese Super League	0	0	-		-		-		0	0
Shandong Luneng/ Shandong Taishan	2009	Chinese Super League	0	0	-		0	0	-		0	0
Shandong Luneng/ Shandong Taishan	2010	Chinese Super League	13	0	-		0	0	-		13	0
Shandong Luneng/ Shandong Taishan	2011	Chinese Super League	1	0	0	0	2	0	-		3	0
Shandong Luneng/ Shandong Taishan	2012	Chinese Super League	0	0	0	0	-		-		0	0
Shandong Luneng/ Shandong Taishan	2013	Chinese Super League	0	0	0	0	-		-		0	0
Shandong Luneng/ Shandong Taishan	2014	Chinese Super League	6	0	3	0	0	0	-		9	0
Shandong Luneng/ Shandong Taishan	2015	Chinese Super League	17	0	1	1	5	0	0 (Note: Appearances in Chinese FA Super Cup)	0	23	1
Shandong Luneng/ Shandong Taishan	2016	Chinese Super League	19	0	0	0	6	0	-		25	0
Shandong Luneng/ Shandong Taishan	2017	Chinese Super League	19	3	4	0	-		-		23	3
Shandong Luneng/ Shandong Taishan	2018	Chinese Super League	23	1	7	1	-		-		30	2
Shandong Luneng/ Shandong Taishan	2019	Chinese Super League	25	2	5	1	9	1	-		39	4
Shandong Luneng/ Shandong Taishan	2020	Chinese Super League	16	0	0	0	-		-		16	0
Shandong Luneng/ Shandong Taishan	2021	Chinese Super League	2	0	0	0	-		-		2	0
Shandong Luneng/ Shandong Taishan	2022	Chinese Super League	7	0	5	0	0	0	-		8	0
Shandong Luneng/ Shandong Taishan	2023	Chinese Super League	12	1	3	0	2	0	-		17	1
Shandong Luneng/ Shandong Taishan	2024	Chinese Super League	10	0	3	0	2	0	-		15	0
Shandong Luneng/ Shandong Taishan	2025	Chinese Super League	5	0	1	0	0	0	-		6	0
Shandong Luneng/ Shandong Taishan	Total		175	7	32	3	26	1	0	0	233	11
Qingdao Hainiu (loan)	2025	Chinese Super League	8	0	1	0	-		-		9	0
Career total			183	7	33	3	26	1	0	0	242	11

== Honours ==
=== Club ===
Shandong Luneng/ Shandong Taishan

- Chinese Super League: 2008, 2010, 2021.
- Chinese FA Cup: 2014, 2020, 2021, 2022.
- Chinese FA Super Cup: 2015
