= Wang Dalei =

Chinese footballer (1989)

Wang Dalei 王大雷
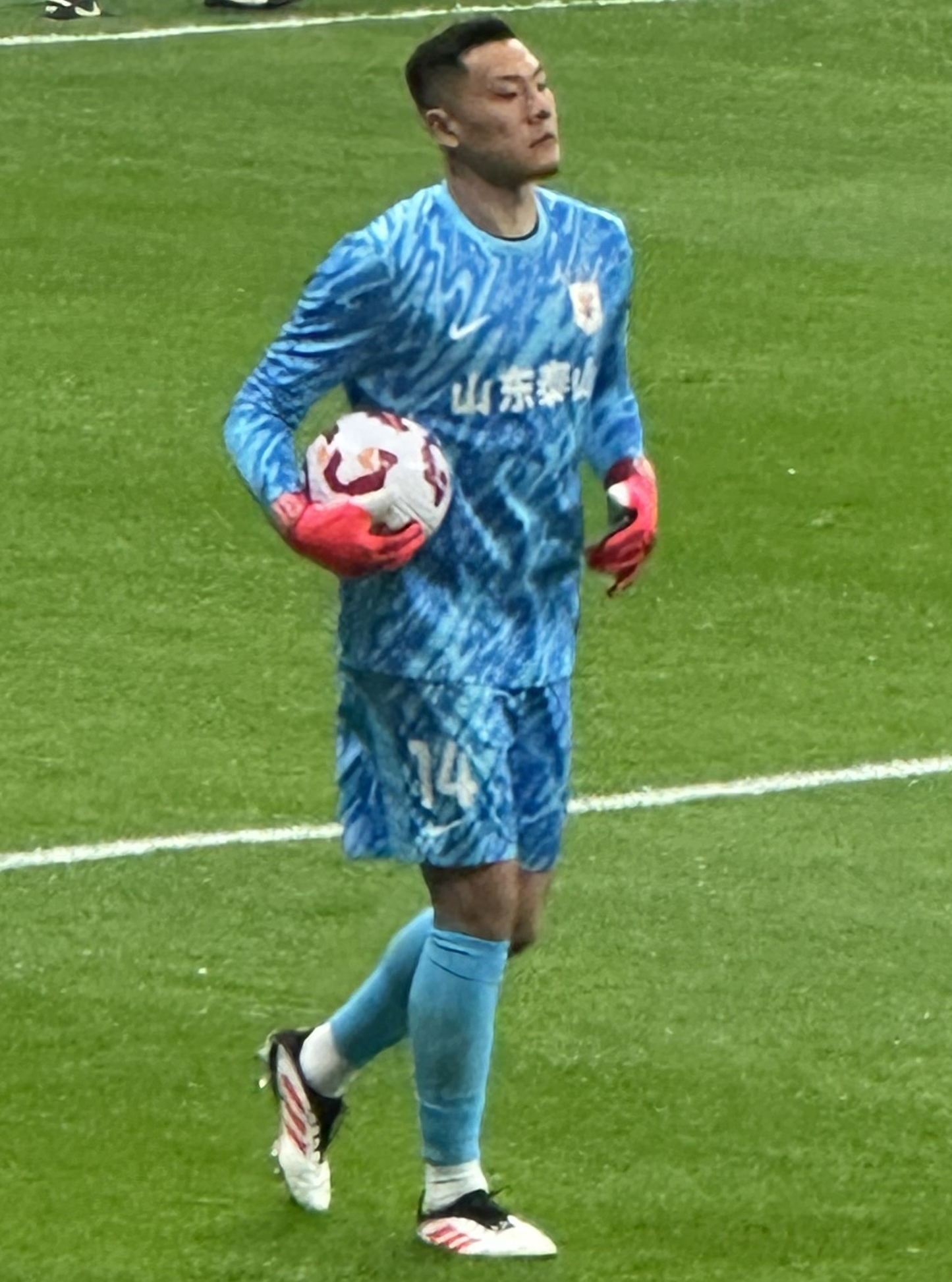
- Wang with Shandong Taishan in April 2025

Personal information
- Full name: Wang Dalei
- Date of birth: 10 January 1989 (age 37)
- Place of birth: Dalian, Liaoning, China
- Height: 1.87 m (6 ft 2 in)
- Position: Goalkeeper

Team information
- Current team: Shandong Taishan
- Number: 14

Youth career
- 2003–2005: Dalian Tielu

Senior career*
Years	Team	Apps	(Gls)
2006	Shanghai United	21	(0)
2007–2013	Shanghai Shenhua	141	(0)
2014–	Shandong Taishan	312	(0)

International career^{‡}
2004–2005	China U17		
2006–2011	China U23		
2012–	China	43	(0)
Medal record
Representing China
Men's football
EAFF Championship
Runner-up	2015 China	Team
Third place	2017 Japan	Team
AFC U-17 Championship
Winner	2004 Japan
- * Club domestic league appearances and goals as of 19 November 2026 ‡ National team caps and goals as of 10 June 2025

Wang Dalei
- Chinese: 王大雷
Transcriptions
Standard Mandarin
- Hanyu Pinyin: Wáng Dàléi
- IPA: [wǎŋ tâ lěɪ]

Wang Dalei (Chinese: 王大雷; pinyin: Wáng Dàléi, born 10 January 1989) is a Chinese professional footballer who currently plays for Chinese Super League club Shandong Taishan and the China national team.

== Club career ==
=== Shanghai United ===
Despite being only seventeen years old, Wang started his football career with Shanghai United, making his debut on 11 March 2006 in a 1–1 draw against Inter Xian which made him the youngest professional goalkeeper in Chinese football history. He quickly made an impact within the team by establishing himself as their first-choice goalkeeper. This saw Serie A club Internazionale interested within and invited him to train with them during the summer break. Wang returned to Shanghai where he continued to be the club's starting goalkeeper, making 22 appearances in his debut season at the end of the 2006 season and winning the Chinese Football Association Young Player of the Year award.

=== Shanghai Shenhua ===
The following season saw Shanghai United merged with Shanghai Shenhua, leading to Wang having to fight for his position as the first choice goalkeeper for the significantly larger squad. Nevertheless, at the end of the 2007 season, Premier League club Manchester City decided to give him a trial along with several other Shanghai players.

Although nothing came out of the trial, Wang's form significantly improved after a disappointing 2007 season. He established himself as the starting goalkeeper the following season, where he saw the club almost miss out on the league title. During the league break, Wang had another trial, this time with Eredivisie side PSV Eindhoven. However, as a result, he missed out on the club's preseason and lost starting role to Qiu Shengjiong. With the appointment of then-coach Miroslav Blažević in the 2010 season, Wang was placed as the club's first choice goalkeeper again. Moreover, his commitments to the Chinese under-23 national team saw him miss much of the season.

=== Shandong Taishan ===
On 1 January 2014, Wang transferred to fellow Chinese Super League club Shandong Luneng. On 25 February, he made his debut for the club in a 1–1 home draw against Buriram United in the 2014 AFC Champions League group stage. Wang won the 2014 Chinese FA Cup with Shandong and was awarded with the Chinese Football Association Goalkeeper of The Year award in November 2014. He was part of the club that won the 2021 Chinese Super League title.

== International career ==
=== Youth ===
Wang was part of the Chinese under-17 national team that won the 2004 AFC U-17 Championship. He also appeared several times for the Chinese under-23 national team in preparation for the 2008 Summer Olympics. Despite this, Wang was dropped from the final squad because he was temporarily replaced as first team goalkeeper at his club by Qiu Shengjiong due to missing pre-season. However, Wang earned his place back into the team in time for the 2010 Asian Games. Unfortunately, after negative fan reaction to a 3-0 loss to Japan by the Chinese under-23 national team, he posted on his microblog: "It would be flattery to call you, fans. You're just a bunch of dogs. You bunch of morons are the main reason why Chinese football can't make progress. You throw in stones after a man has fallen into a well." His comments would see him suspended from the team despite making an apology.

=== Senior ===
Wang received his first call-up to the Chinese national team in May 2006 for a friendly matches against Switzerland and France. Six years later, on 6 September 2012, he made his debut for the national in a 1–0 loss against Sweden and was named man of the match after an impressive performance.

Wang was China's first choice goalkeeper for the 2015 AFC Asian Cup, where China reached the quarter-finals, losing against hosts and eventual winners Australia in Brisbane. In the opening group stage match against Saudi Arabia on 10 January 2015, his 26th birthday, Wang saved a penalty when the score was still goalless. China eventually scored a late winner and won the match.

Wang was also a member of the Chinese squad for the 2019 and 2023 AFC Asian Cups.

== Career statistics ==
=== Club statistics ===
As of 19 November 2026

Appearances and goals by club, season and competition
Club	Season	League			National Cup		Continental		Other		Total	
Club	Season	Division	Apps	Goals	Apps	Goals	Apps	Goals	Apps	Goals	Apps	Goals
Shanghai United	2006	Chinese Super League	21	0	1	0	-		-		22	0
Shanghai Shenhua	2007	Chinese Super League	12	0	-		4	0	3 (Note: Appearances in A3 Champions Cup)	0	19	0
Shanghai Shenhua	2008	Chinese Super League	22	0	-		-		-		22	0
Shanghai Shenhua	2009	Chinese Super League	14	0	-		0	0	-		14	0
Shanghai Shenhua	2010	Chinese Super League	15	0	-		-		-		15	0
Shanghai Shenhua	2011	Chinese Super League	21	0	0	0	3	0	-		24	0
Shanghai Shenhua	2012	Chinese Super League	29	0	2	0	-		-		31	0
Shanghai Shenhua	2013	Chinese Super League	28	0	0	0	-		-		28	0
Shanghai Shenhua	Total		141	0	2	0	7	0	3	0	153	0
Shandong Taishan	2014	Chinese Super League	29	0	6	0	6	0	-		41	0
Shandong Taishan	2015	Chinese Super League	30	0	4	0	6	0	1 (Note: Appearances in Chinese FA Super Cup)	0	41	0
Shandong Taishan	2016	Chinese Super League	29	0	1	0	11	0	-		41	0
Shandong Taishan	2017	Chinese Super League	30	0	2	0	-		-		32	0
Shandong Taishan	2018	Chinese Super League	21	0	4	0	-		-		25	0
Shandong Taishan	2019	Chinese Super League	26	0	5	0	7	0	-		38	0
Shandong Taishan	2020	Chinese Super League	5	0	2	0	-		-		7	0
Shandong Taishan	2021	Chinese Super League	20	0	1	0	-		-		21	0
Shandong Taishan	2022	Chinese Super League	27	0	4	0	0	0	-		32	0
Shandong Taishan	2023	Chinese Super League	28	0	3	0	9 (Note: Appearances in 2023–24 AFC Champions League)	0	-		40	0
Shandong Taishan	2024	Chinese Super League	23	0	3	0	8 (Note: Seven appearances in 2024–25 AFC Champions League, one appearance in qualification)	0	-		34	0
Shandong Taishan	2025	Chinese Super League	24	0	2	0	-		-		26	0
Shandong Taishan	2026	Chinese Super League	20	0	1	0	-		-		21	0
Shandong Taishan	Total		312	0	38	0	47	0	1	0	398	0
Career total			474	0	41	0	54	0	4	0	573	0

=== International statistics ===
National team
Year	Apps	Goals
2012	2	0
2013	2	0
2014	6	0
2015	13	0
2016	1	0
2017	3	0
2018	0	0
2019	1	0
2023	2	0
2024	9	0
2025	4	0
Total	41	0

== Honours ==
Shanghai Shenhua

- A3 Champions Cup: 2007

Shandong Taishan

- Chinese Super League: 2021
- Chinese FA Cup: 2014, 2020, 2021, 2022
- Chinese FA Super Cup: 2015

China U17

- AFC U-17 Championship: 2004

Individual

- AFC U-17 Championship Most Valuable Player: 2004
- Chinese Football Association Young Player of the Year: 2006
- Chinese Football Association Goalkeeper of the Year: 2014, 2023, 2024
- Chinese Super League Team of the Year: 2014, 2023, 2024
- Chinese FA Super Cup Most Valuable Player: 2015
