= 2015 Chinese FA Super Cup =

Guangzhou Evergrande	Shandong Luneng
0	0
- Shandong Luneng won 5–3 on penalties
- Date: 14 February 2015
- Venue: Yellow Dragon Sports Center, Hangzhou
- Man of the Match: (China) Wang Dalei
- Referee: Wang Jin (Tianjin)
- Attendance: 16,974
- Weather: Cloudy

Chang'an Ford 2015 Chinese FA Super Cup (Chinese: 长安福特2015中国足球协会超级杯) was the 13th Chinese FA Super Cup. The match was sponsored by Changan Ford Mazda Automobile Co., Ltd. and played at Yellow Dragon Sports Center on 14 February 2015, contested by Super League winners Guangzhou Evergrande Taobao and FA Cup winners Shandong Luneng Taishan. Shandong Luneng Taishan defeated Guangzhou Evergrande 5–3 in the penalty shoot-out, thus winning their first Chinese FA Super Cup title, and Guangzhou lost for three consecutive years.

== Match ==
=== Details ===
14 February 2015
16:00 UTC+8

Guangzhou Evergrande Taobao	0–0	Shandong Luneng Taishan
Penalties
Elkeson (penalty scored); Goulart (penalty scored); Alan (penalty scored); Huang Bowen (penalty missed)	3–5	(penalty scored) Tardelli; (penalty scored) Wang Yongpo; (penalty scored) Júnior Urso; (penalty scored) Zheng Zheng; (penalty scored) Aloísio

Yellow Dragon Sports Center, Hangzhou
Attendance: 16,974
Referee: Wang Jin (Tianjin)

GK	19	(China) Zeng Cheng
RB	33	(China) Rong Hao
CB	6	(China) Feng Xiaoting
CB	3	(China) Mei Fang
LB	35	(China) Li Xuepeng
CM	8	(Brazil) Renê Júnior		(substituted off) 74'
CM	10	(China) Zheng Zhi (c)
CM	16	(China) Huang Bowen	(yellow card) 71'
LW	20	(China) Yu Hanchao		(substituted off) 74'
RW	29	(China) Gao Lin		(substituted off) 60'
CF	9	(Brazil) Elkeson
Substitutes:
GK	22	(China) Li Shuai
DF	17	(China) Liu Jian
DF	25	(China) Zou Zheng
MF	11	(Brazil) Ricardo Goulart		(substituted on) 74'
MF	21	(China) Zhao Xuri		(substituted on) 74'
MF	27	(China) Zheng Long
FW	7	(Brazil) Alan Carvalho		(substituted on) 60'
Coach:
(Italy) Fabio Cannavaro

GK	23	(China) Wang Dalei (c)
RB	2	(China) Zhao Mingjian	(yellow card) 65'
CB	3	(China) Dai Lin	(yellow card) 73'
CB	16	(China) Wang Qiang
LB	6	(China) Zheng Zheng
DM	5	(Brazil) Júnior Urso
DM	15	(China) Li Wei		(substituted off) 80'
AM	10	(Argentina) Walter Montillo		(substituted off) 65'
LW	11	(China) Liu Binbin	(yellow card) 44'	(substituted off) 57'
RW	22	(China) Hao Junmin
CF	9	(Brazil) Diego Tardelli
Substitutes:
GK	1	(China) Yang Cheng
DF	13	(China) Zhang Chi
MF	7	(China) Zhang Wenzhao
MF	8	(China) Wang Yongpo		(substituted on) 80'
MF	12	(China) Jin Jingdao
MF	21	(Brazil) Aloísio		(substituted on) 65'
FW	18	(China) Han Peng		(substituted on) 57'
Coach:
(Brazil) Cuca

Man of the Match:
(China) Wang Dalei (Shandong Luneng Taishan)

Assistant referees:
Mu Yuxin (Tianjin)
Zhang Yongjun (Shanghai)
Fourth official:
Li Jun (Jiangsu)

Chinese FA Super Cup
2015 Winners
Shandong Luneng Taishan
First title
