= List of Urawa Red Diamonds records and statistics =

This article contains records and statistics for the Japanese professional football club, Urawa Red Diamonds.

== J.League ==
Season	League	Place	GP	Pts	Win	Draw	Lose	Average Crowd
1993	J. League First Stage	10 / 10	18	-	3	-	15	11,459
1993	J. League Second Stage	10 / 10	18	-	5	-	13	11,459
1993	J. League Total	10 / 10	36	-	8	-	28	11,459
1994	J. League First Stage	12 / 12	22	-	6	-	16	18,475
1994	J. League Second Stage	11 / 12	22	-	8	-	14	18,475
1994	J. League Total	12 / 12	44	-	14	-	30	18,475
1995	J. League First Stage	3 / 14	26	48	15	-	11	19,560
1995	J. League Second Stage	8 / 14	26	42	14	-	12	19,560
1995	J. League Total	4 / 14	52	90	29	-	23	19,560
1996	J. League	6 / 16	30	59	19	-	11	24,329
1997	J. League First Stage	9 / 17	16	21	8	-	8	20,504
1997	J. League Second Stage	7 / 17	16	26	9	-	7	20,504
1997	J. League Total	10 / 17	32	47	17	-	15	20,504
1998	J. League First Stage	7 / 18	17	28	11	-	6	22,706
1998	J. League Second Stage	3 / 18	17	33	11	-	6	22,706
1998	J. League Total	6 / 18	34	61	22	-	12	22,706
1999	J. League Division 1 First Stage	13 / 16	15	13	3	4	8	21,206
1999	J. League Division 1 Second Stage	14 / 16	15	15	5	1	9	21,206
1999	J. League Division 1 Total	15 / 16	30	28	8	5	17	21,206
2000	J. League Division 2	Runners-up / 11	40	82	28	3	9	16,923
2001	J. League Division 1 First Stage	7 / 16	15	21	7	1	7	26,720
2001	J. League Division 1 Second Stage	12 / 16	15	15	4	3	8	26,720
2001	J. League Division 1 Total	10 / 16	30	36	11	4	15	26,720
2002	J. League Division 1 First Stage	11 / 16	15	14	5	1	9	26,296
2002	J. League Division 1 Second Stage	8 / 16	15	21	8	1	6	26,296
2002	J. League Division 1 Total	11 / 16	30	35	13	2	15	26,296
2003	J. League Division 1 First Stage	6 / 16	15	24	7	3	5	28,855
2003	J. League Division 1 Second Stage	6 / 16	15	23	6	5	4	28,855
2003	J. League Division 1 Total	6 / 16	30	47	13	8	9	28,855
2004	J. League Division 1 First Stage	3 / 16	15	25	7	4	4	36,660
2004	J. League Division 1 Second Stage	Champions / 16	15	37	12	1	2	36,660
2004	J. League Division 1 Total	Runners-up / 16	30	62	19	5	6	36,660
2005	J. League Division 1	Runners-up / 18	34	59	17	8	9	39,357
2006	J. League Division 1	Champions / 18	34	72	22	6	6	45,573
2007	J. League Division 1	Runners-up / 18	34	70	20	10	4	46,667
2008	J. League Division 1	7 / 18	34	53	15	8	11	47,609
2009	J. League Division 1	6 / 18	34	52	16	4	14	44,210
2010	J. League Division 1	10 / 18	34	48	14	6	14	39,941

Key to colors
1st division
2nd division

== Domestic cup competitions ==
Year	Emperor's Cup	J. League Cup	Super Cup
1992	Semi-finals	Group Stage	-
1993	2nd Round	Group Stage	-
1994	3rd Round	Quarter-finals	-
1995	Quarter-finals	Not Held	-
1996	Semi-finals	Group Stage	-
1997	4th Round	Quarter-finals	-
1998	Quarter-finals	Group Stage	-
1999	4th Round	Quarter-finals	-
2000	4th Round	1st Round	-
2001	Semi-finals	Quarter-finals	-
2002	3rd Round	Runners-up	-
2003	3rd Round	Champions	-
2004	Semi-finals	Runners-up	-
2005	Champions	Semi-finals	-
2006	Champions	Quarter-finals	Champions
2007	4th Round	Quarter-finals	Runners-up
2008	5th Round	Group Stage	-
2009	Quarter-finals	Group Stage	-
2010	Quarter-finals	Group Stage	-

== Major international competitions ==
Season	Competition	Result	Average Crowd
2007	AFC Champions League	Champions	?
2007	A3 Champions Cup	3rd	-
2007	FIFA Club World Cup	3rd	-
2008	AFC Champions League	Semi-finals	?

== Top scorers by season ==
Season	Player	Domestic league	Ref
2010	(Brazil) Edmilson	16	

== International games ==
Date	Venue	Opponent	Score	Result	Competition
04-04-1992	Saitama, Japan	(Thailand) Port Authority	3-0	Win	Friendly
04-24-1993	Saitama, Japan	(England) Manchester City	0-2	Lose	Friendly
06-29-1994	Saitama, Japan	(Argentina) Independiente	3-5	Lose	Friendly
07-19-1994	Fukuoka, Japan	(Paraguay) Olimpia	0-1	Lose	Coca-Cola Cup
10-08-1994	Niigata, Japan	(South Korea) Jeonbuk Hyundai Motors	2-1	Win	Friendly
08-01-1995	Saitama, Japan	(Brazil) Flamengo	1-3	Lose	Friendly
03-10-1996	Saitama, Japan	(Uruguay) Peñarol	1-1	Draw	Friendly
12-14-1996	Tokyo, Japan	(Germany) VfB Stuttgart	5-0	Win	Friendly
07-22-1997	Saitama, Japan	(England) Manchester United	1-2	Lose	Sharp Cup
01-23-2000	Amsterdam, Netherlands	(Netherlands) Ajax	1-1	Draw	Friendly
02-25-2001	Saitama, Japan	(United States) Los Angeles Galaxy	2-1	Win	Friendly
05-26-2002	Matsumoto, Japan	Paraguay NT	0-2	Lose	Friendly
06-04-2003	Saitama, Japan	(Netherlands) Feyenoord	2-2	Draw	Saitama City Cup
07-27-2004	Saitama, Japan	(Italy) Inter Milan	1-0	Win	Saitama City Cup
08-03-2004	Manchester, England	(Argentina) Boca Juniors	2-5	Lose	Vodafone Cup
05-31-2005	Saitama, Japan	(Germany) Hamburger SV	0-2	Lose	Friendly
06-15-2005	Saitama, Japan	(Spain) Barcelona	0-3	Lose	Saitama City Cup
07-30-2005	Saitama, Japan	(England) Manchester United	0-2	Lose	Friendly
07-31-2006	Saitama, Japan	(Germany) Bayern Munich	1-0	Win	Saitama City Cup
02-13-2007	Salzburg, Austria	(Austria) Red Bull Salzburg	1-3	Lose	Bulls Cup (45-minute game)
02-13-2007	Salzburg, Austria	(Germany) Bayern Munich	0-3	Lose	Bulls Cup (45-minute game)
03-07-2007	Saitama, Japan	(Indonesia) Persik Kediri	3-0	Win	AFC Champions League Group Stage Round 1
03-21-2007	Sydney, Australia	(Australia) Sydney FC	2-2	Draw	AFC Champions League Group Stage Round 2
04-11-2007	Saitama, Japan	(China) Shanghai Shenhua	1-0	Win	AFC Champions League Group Stage Round 3
04-25-2007	Shanghai, China	(China) Shanghai Shenhua	0-0	Draw	AFC Champions League Group Stage Round 4
05-09-2007	Surakarta, Indonesia	(Indonesia) Persik Kediri	3-3	Draw	AFC Champions League Group Stage Round 5
05-23-2007	Saitama, Japan	(Australia) Sydney FC	0-0	Draw	AFC Champions League Group Stage Round 6
06-07-2007	Jinan, China	(China) Shandong Luneng	3-4	Lose	A3 Champions Cup Round 1
06-10-2007	Jinan, China	(South Korea) Seongnam Ilhwa Chunma	1-0	Win	A3 Champions Cup Round 2
06-13-2007	Jinan, China	(China) Shanghai Shenhua	1-3	Lose	A3 Champions Cup Round 3
07-17-2007	Saitama, Japan	(England) Manchester United	2-2	Draw	Saitama City Cup
09-19-2007	Saitama, Japan	(South Korea) Jeonbuk Hyundai Motors	2-1	Win	AFC Champions League Quarterfinals 1st Leg
09-26-2007	Jeonju, Korea Republic	(South Korea) Jeonbuk Hyundai Motors	2-0	Win	AFC Champions League Quarterfinals 2nd Leg
10-03-2007	Seongnam, Korea Republic	(South Korea) Seongnam Ilhwa Chunma	2-2	Draw	AFC Champions League Semifinals 1st Leg
10-24-2007	Saitama, Japan	(South Korea) Seongnam Ilhwa Chunma	2-2 aet (PS 5-3)	Draw	AFC Champions League Semifinals 2nd Leg
11-07-2007	Esfahan, Iran	(Iran) Sepahan	1-1	Draw	AFC Champions League Final 1st Leg
11-14-2007	Saitama, Japan	(Iran) Sepahan	2-0	Win	AFC Champions League Final 2nd Leg
12-10-2007	Toyota, Japan	(Iran) Sepahan	3-1	Win	FIFA Club World Cup Quarterfinals
12-13-2007	Yokohama, Japan	(Italy) A.C. Milan	0-1	Lose	FIFA Club World Cup Semifinals
12-16-2007	Yokohama, Japan	(Tunisia) Étoile Sportive du Sahel	2-2 (PS 4-2)	Draw	FIFA Club World Cup Match for 3rd place
07-31-2008	Saitama, Japan	(Germany) Bayern Munich	2-4	Lose	Saitama City Cup
09-17-2008	Kuwait City, Kuwait	(Kuwait) Al Qadisiya	2-3	Lose	AFC Champions League Quarterfinals 1st Leg
09-24-2008	Saitama, Japan	(Kuwait) Al Qadisiya	2-0	Win	AFC Champions League Quarterfinals 2nd Leg
10-08-2008	Osaka Expo '70 Stadium, Japan	(Japan) Gamba Osaka	1-1	Draw	AFC Champions League Semifinals 1st Leg
10-22-2008	Saitama, Japan	(Japan) Gamba Osaka	1-3	Lose	AFC Champions League Semifinals 2nd Leg

- Key:
  - aet - after extra time
  - PS - after penalty shootout
