= Li Wei (footballer, born 1985) =

Chinese footballer

Li Wei 李微
Personal information
- Full name: Li Wei
- Date of birth: March 18, 1985 (age 41)
- Place of birth: Beijing, China
- Height: 1.80 m (5 ft 11 in)
- Position: Midfielder

Youth career
- 2001–2004: Shandong Luneng

Senior career*
| Years | Team | Apps | (Gls) |
| 2005–2019 | Shandong Luneng | 118 | (6) |
| 2013 | → Wuhan Zall (loan) | 25 | (4) |
| 2019 | Zibo Cuju | 15 | (2) |
| 2020–2021 | Zhejiang FC | 15 | (0) |

Managerial career
- 2022–2025: Zhejiang FC Youth (assistant)
- 2026–: Zhejiang FC U16
- * Club domestic league appearances and goals as of 27 April 2022

Li Wei (Chinese: 李微; pinyin: Lǐ Wēi; born 18 March 1985) is a Chinese former footballer who played as a midfielder.

== Club career ==
Li Wei was born in Beijing. He moved to Shandong to begin his football career, where he would play for the Shandong Luneng under-19 youth team. With Shandong Luneng comfortably winning the 2006 Chinese Super League title the club's manager Ljubiša Tumbaković allowed Li Wei to graduate to the senior team on October 5, 2006, which he came onto as a substitute against Shanghai Shenhua in a 2-1 defeat. This was his only appearance in the season. It was not until the 2007 league season that saw Li Wei establish himself as a regular member of the Shandong team when he played in seventeen league games for them, which also included his first senior goal on May 9, 2007 in an AFC Champions League group game vs Adelaide United at Jinan. This was followed by his first league goal against Wuhan Guanggu on September 5, 2007 in a 2-0 win. The following season, however, would see Li Wei struggle to remain as a first choice player. Despite winning the 2008 Chinese Super League title with the club he was mainly used as a peripheral squad player within the team. He would continue to be used as a substitute until the introduction of Branko Ivanković as the club's new manager in the 2010 league season. Wei's ability to play in numerous midfield positions saw him gain significantly more playing time under Ivanković's reign and aid Shandong to win another league title.

With the exit of Ivanković, due to poor results within the 2011 AFC Champions League that saw the club eliminated within the group stages, Li's playing time significantly diminished. On 18 February 2013 he would be loaned out to recently promoted top tier club Wuhan Zall. While he immediately established himself as an integral member of the team, he could not aid them from avoiding relegation at the end of the 2013 Chinese Super League. Upon his return to Shandong, Li continued to be a consistent squad member within the team until he left the club in a free transfer to join third tier club Zibo Cuju on 12 June 2019. After one season with the club he left on a free transfer to second tier club Zhejiang FC on 28 February 2020. After two seasons with the club he would aid them to promotion to the top tier at the end of the 2021 campaign. He would retire from professional football after the 2021 season and move into coaching.

== Coaching career ==
On 11 February 2026, Li was appointed as the head coach of Zhejiang FC U16.

== Career statistics ==
As of 22 April 2022.

Appearances and goals by club, season and competition
| Club | Season | League | | | National Cup | | League Cup | | Continental | | Other | | Total | |
| Club | Season | Division | Apps | Goals | Apps | Goals | Apps | Goals | Apps | Goals | Apps | Goals | Apps | Goals |
|---|---|---|---|---|---|---|---|---|---|---|---|---|---|---|
| Shandong Luneng | 2005 | Chinese Super League | 0 | 0 | 0 | 0 | | 0 | - | | - | | 0 | 0 |
| Shandong Luneng | 2006 | Chinese Super League | 1 | 0 | 0 | 0 | - | | - | | - | | 1 | 0 |
| Shandong Luneng | 2007 | Chinese Super League | 17 | 3 | - | | - | | 1 | 1 | - | | 18 | 4 |
| Shandong Luneng | 2008 | Chinese Super League | 13 | 0 | - | | - | | - | | - | | 13 | 0 |
| Shandong Luneng | 2009 | Chinese Super League | 11 | 0 | - | | - | | 4 | 0 | - | | 15 | 0 |
| Shandong Luneng | 2010 | Chinese Super League | 18 | 3 | - | | - | | 1 | 1 | - | | 18 | 3 |
| Shandong Luneng | 2011 | Chinese Super League | 21 | 0 | 1 | 0 | - | | 5 | 0 | - | | 27 | 0 |
| Shandong Luneng | 2012 | Chinese Super League | 5 | 0 | 0 | 0 | - | | - | | - | | 5 | 0 |
| Shandong Luneng | 2014 | Chinese Super League | 8 | 0 | 4 | 0 | - | | 1 | 0 | - | | 13 | 0 |
| Shandong Luneng | 2015 | Chinese Super League | 9 | 0 | 1 | 0 | - | | 3 | 0 | 1 (Note: Appearances in Chinese FA Super Cup) | 0 | 14 | 0 |
| Shandong Luneng | 2016 | Chinese Super League | 8 | 0 | 2 | 1 | - | | 6 | 0 | - | | 16 | 1 |
| Shandong Luneng | 2017 | Chinese Super League | 6 | 0 | 2 | 0 | - | | - | | - | | 8 | 0 |
| Shandong Luneng | 2018 | Chinese Super League | 1 | 0 | 0 | 0 | - | | - | | - | | 1 | 0 |
| Shandong Luneng | Total | | 118 | 6 | 10 | 1 | 0 | 0 | 21 | 2 | 1 | 0 | 150 | 9 |
| Wuhan Zall (Loan) | 2013 | Chinese Super League | 25 | 4 | 0 | 0 | - | | - | | - | | 25 | 4 |
| Zibo Cuju | 2019 | China League Two | 15 | 2 | 0 | 0 | - | | - | | - | | 15 | 2 |
| Zhejiang Greentown | 2020 | China League One | 9 | 0 | 0 | 0 | - | | - | | 0 (Note: Appearance(s) in CSL Relegation play-offs) | 0 | 9 | 0 |
| Zhejiang Greentown | 2021 | China League One | 6 | 0 | 2 | 0 | - | | - | | 0 | 0 | 8 | 0 |
| Zhejiang Greentown | Total | | 15 | 0 | 2 | 0 | 0 | 0 | 0 | 0 | 0 | 0 | 17 | 0 |
| Career total | | | 173 | 12 | 12 | 1 | 0 | 0 | 21 | 2 | 1 | 0 | 207 | 15 |

== Honours ==
=== Club ===
Shandong Luneng

- Chinese Super League: 2006, 2008, 2010
- Chinese FA Cup: 2006, 2014
- Chinese FA Super Cup: 2015
