= Walter Montillo =

Argentine footballer

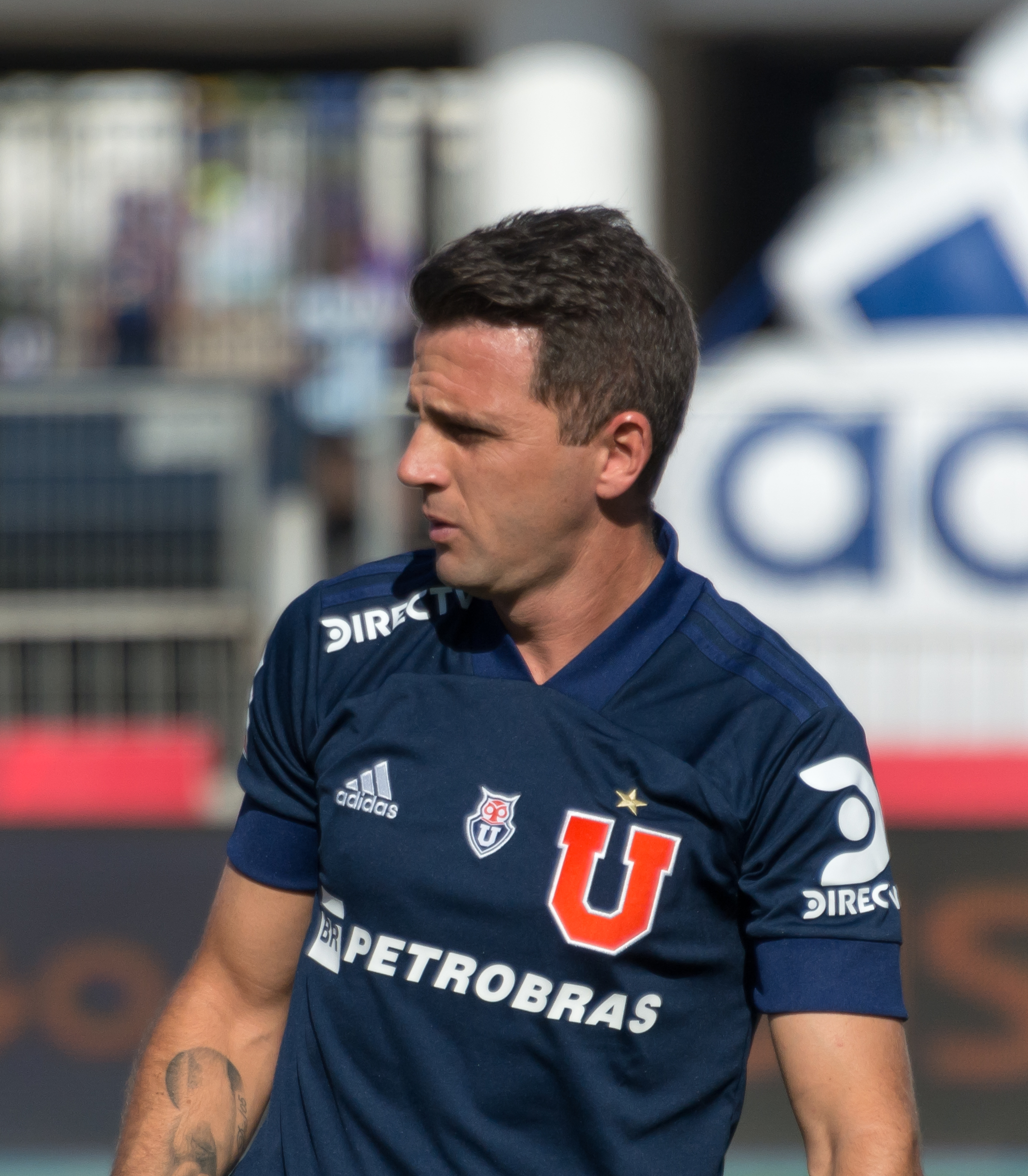
- Montillo with Universidad de Chile in 2020

Personal information
- Full name: Walter Damián Montillo
- Date of birth: 14 April 1984 (age 42)
- Place of birth: Lanús, Buenos Aires, Argentina
- Height: 1.70 m (5 ft 7 in)
- Position: Attacking midfielder

Youth career
- San Lorenzo

Senior career*
Years	Team	Apps	(Gls)
2002–2007	San Lorenzo	97	(6)
2006–2007	→ Morelia (loan)	25	(2)
2008–2010	Universidad de Chile	62	(10)
2010–2012	Cruzeiro	89	(23)
2013–2014	Santos	26	(5)
2014–2016	Shandong Luneng	64	(14)
2017	Botafogo	6	(0)
2018–2019	Tigre	34	(6)
2020–2021	Universidad de Chile	31	(4)
Total		434	(70)

International career
2003	Argentina U20	5	(0)
2011–2013	Argentina	6	(0)
- * Club domestic league appearances and goals

Walter Damián Montillo (Spanish pronunciation: [ˈwalteɾ monˈtiʝo]; born 14 April 1984) is an Argentine former footballer who played as an attacking midfielder.

== Career ==
=== San Lorenzo ===
He began in the youth ranks of Argentine club San Lorenzo and his professional debut came in 2002. In 2006, he moved to Mexican side Monarcas Morelia. He was a fixture in the starting line-up for the Mexican club. He returned to San Lorenzo in 2007, but did not find regularity with the first team, only playing six games.

In 2008, he was sold to Universidad de Chile for $1 million and signed a five-year contract with the club. At the time the price tag was the most ever paid by a Chilean club. However, since the move, Colo-Colo paid $1.2 million for Domingo Salcedo and then paid $2.2 for Macnelly Torres.

=== Universidad de Chile ===
Actuating at Universidad de Chile, he started gaining a reputation, managed by Sergio Markarián. In the 2010 Copa Libertadores, he obtained visibility in Brazil, after appearances in the matches against Flamengo, scoring a goal in the second match.

Although losing it, they won over Flamengo by away goal. During the competition, Montillo dedicated his goals to his newborn baby Santino, who has Down syndrome; he grew visibly emotional after the crowd then chanted in support of Santino.

During the campaign in La U into Libertadores, Montillo became harassed in many Brazilian teams, including Flamengo and Vasco da Gama, but the one who really did get the Argentinean midfielder was Cruzeiro; even though his contract renew with Universidad de Chile until 2014, after rejecting the Flamengo's offer. His hiring at the Celeste squad was announced on July 2 by US$3.5 million, and he joined the club after Universidad de Chile finished playing the Copa Libertadores, which the team left in the semifinals.

=== Cruzeiro ===
==== 2010 ====
On 15 August, he made his debut against São Paulo FC, in a 2–2 away draw, making an assist to the 83rd-minute goal by Thiago Ribeiro. Montillo scored his first goal against Corinthians in a 1–0 win in the 3rd minute, match that took in place in Uberlândia. Besides conducting the team's midfield, he showed himself as a scorer — in 15 matches, he scored 7 times, beating his total score at San Lorenzo, which he considered the best moment in its career. With Montillo, the squad's avail increased from 50% to 62%.

In 2010's December 5, after Cruzeiro get the runner-up in the Brazilian League, Montillo was laureate with the Armando Nogueira Trophy as the best player in the competition. In the following day, he got Placar's Bola de Prata as one of the best midfielders of the League, receiving it from the hands of Sorín — an old school idol in Cruzeiro.

==== 2011 ====
In 2011, at the first match in the Copa Libertadores done by Cruzeiro in the year, Montillo scored twice, as well as giving assistance in the rout over the Argentinean Estudiantes by 5-0 — in a spectacle that had a special taste for Cruzeiro, once their last match was played their elimination at the 2009 Copa Libertadores by 1–2 at the Mineirão —. Wondrously, the Celeste squad was eliminated at the round of, against Colombian Once Caldas, a fact that shocked supporters and the South America's media.

In the Brazilian league, after being criticized along the entire Cruzeiro squad, which began very poorly the championship, Montillo recovered its football with the arising of the manager Joel Santana. He did the two goals of the victory over Grêmio by the 8th round, on July 6, getting the best scorer position in the league for a few rounds. Diverging among the bad Cruzeiro appearance in the Brazilian League in that year, Montillo then won his second Bola de Prata followed by the title as one of the best midfielders in the league again. In 2011, he was the Argentinean midfielder who most scored in all the world.

==== 2012 ====
In 2012's 25 February, Montillo became Cruzeiro's biggest foreign scorer of all time since 1942 — when the team left its old name Palestra Itália —, after scoring twice against Democrata, reaching the mark of 30 goals, beating Víctor Aristizábal, which scored 28 times with the Celeste uniform. In March, the player renewed its contract to actuate in Cruzeiro until the end of 2015. Cruzeiro's president Gilvan Tavares increased the termination fine to €80 million, making Montillo the most expensive player in the South America.

=== Santos ===
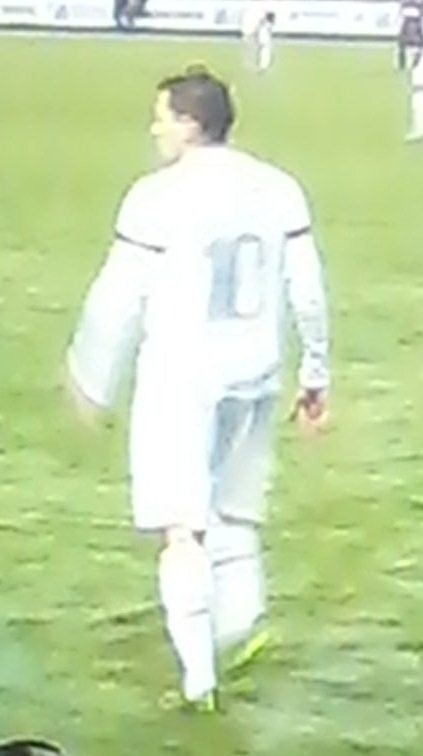
Montillo playing for Santos.

On 3 January 2013, through Twitter, Santos announced Montillo as their player for next season. Despite the undisclosed negotiation, it is thought that Montillo was bought for R$16 million. Montillo must wear shirt number 10, that was worn until 2012 by Paulo Henrique Ganso. The coach of the club, Muricy Ramalho, praised his coming. The player made his debut wearing the shirt of Peixe on January 16, 2013, when the club won Grêmio Barueri for 4–0. Montillo approved the victory and his partnership with Neymar, who he praised.

=== Shandong Luneng ===
In January 2014, Montillo joined Chinese side Shandong Luneng for approximately €7.5 million.

=== Botafogo ===
In December 2016, it was announced that Montillo joined Botafogo. He made his 2017 Campeonato Brasileiro Série A debut on 26 June 2017 against Avaí starting the match but being replaced after only seven minutes due to a calf injury, having suffered the same injury twice in the previous months.

Montillo announced his retirement on 29 June 2017.

== International career ==
He played for Argentina U20 in the 2003 FIFA World Youth Championship in United Arab Emirates. He played in most of the team's games.

In September 2011, he was called up to the full side by Alejandro Sabella, wearing the number 7 shirt in the second match against Brazil in the mini-tournament "Superclássico das Américas", in which only players who were playing in South America could be selected. Although his team lost 2–0, Montillo was profusely praised by the Argentinian media. He was again called up to represent Argentina in the friendly match against Brazil in November 2012.

He made his first official competitive appearance for the national team against Venezuela in a World Cup qualification match on 22 March 2013. His performance in this game was praised by Muricy Ramalho, the coach of Montillo's club Santos. According to Ramalho, the Argentine "did very well. He is improving step by step." On 7 June 2013 against Colombia he was one of the starting eleven, as Lionel Messi had only just returned from a hamstring injury.

== Personal life ==
His eldest son, Valentín, is a Chilean-born footballer from the Escuela de Fútbol Madrid Oeste Boadilla (E.F.M.O. Boadilla). In 2026, he joined the Universidad de Chile under-18 team.

== After football ==
In 2021, he became a football agent and joined BYP Argentina, a football agency.

His first book, Gracias a la vida (Thanks to life), is an autobiography published in 2021 that includes a prologue of Neymar. In 2022 he published Carlitos Cachaña, a children's book about a child who dreams of being a professional footballer.

== Career statistics ==
=== Club ===
Appearances and goals by club, season and competition
Club	Season	League			State League		Cup		Continental		Other		Total	
Club	Season	Division	Apps	Goals	Apps	Goals	Apps	Goals	Apps	Goals	Apps	Goals	Apps	Goals
San Lorenzo	2002–03	Argentine Primera División	4	0	—		—		—		—		4	0
San Lorenzo	2003–04	Argentine Primera División	30	3	—		—		3	1	—		33	4
San Lorenzo	2004–05	Argentine Primera División	28	1	—		—		7	0	—		35	1
San Lorenzo	2005–06	Argentine Primera División	29	2	—		—		—		—		29	2
San Lorenzo	2007–08	Argentine Primera División	6	0	—		—		—		—		6	0
San Lorenzo	Total		97	6	—		—		10	1	—		107	7
Morelia (loan)	2006–07	Liga MX	25	2	—		—		—		3	0	28	2
Universidad de Chile	2008	Chilean Primera División	35	6	—		0	0	—		—		35	6
Universidad de Chile	2009	Chilean Primera División	17	2	—		0	0	10	3	1	0	28	5
Universidad de Chile	2010	Chilean Primera División	10	2	—		0	0	12	2	—		22	4
Universidad de Chile	Total		62	10	—		0	0	22	3	1	0	85	15
Cruzeiro	2010	Série A	23	7	—		—		—		—		23	7
Cruzeiro	2011	Série A	34	12	10	6	—		7	3	—		51	21
Cruzeiro	2012	Série A	32	4	11	4	2	0	—		—		45	8
Cruzeiro	Total		89	23	21	10	2	0	7	3	—		119	36
Santos	2013	Série A	26	5	18	2	5	1	—		—		49	8
Santos	2014	Série A	—		1	0	—		—		—		1	0
Santos	Total		26	5	19	2	5	1	—		—		50	8
Shandong Luneng	2014	Chinese Super League	26	2	—		5	0	6	0	—		37	2
Shandong Luneng	2015	Chinese Super League	14	3	—		4	1	4	2	1	0	23	6
Shandong Luneng	2016	Chinese Super League	24	9	—		2	0	10	4	—		36	13
Shandong Luneng	Total		64	14	–		11	1	20	6	1	0	96	21
Botafogo	2017	Série A	6	0	7	0	—		4	0	—		17	0
Tigre	2018–19	Argentine Primera División	20	4	—		1	0	—		7	2	28	6
Tigre	2019–20	Argentine Primera División	14	2	—		0	0	—		1	0	15	2
Tigre	Total		34	6	—		1	0	—		8	2	43	8
Universidad de Chile	2020	Chilean Primera División	31	4	—		1	0	1	0	—		33	4
Career Total			434	70	47	12	20	2	64	13	13	2	577	99

=== International appearances and goals ===
#	Date	Venue	Opponent	Final score	Goal	Result	Competition
1.	September 28, 2011	Belém, Brazil	Brazil	2–0	0	Lost	2011 Superclásico de las Américas.

== Honours ==
San Lorenzo

- Copa Sudamericana: 2002

Universidad de Chile

- Primera División de Chile: 2009 Apertura

Cruzeiro

- Campeonato Mineiro: 2011

Shandong Luneng

- Chinese FA Cup: 2014
- Chinese FA Super Cup: 2015

Individual

- Campeonato Brasileiro Série A Team of the Year: 2010

== See also ==
- List of athletes who came out of retirement
