= Wang Yongpo =

Chinese footballer

Wang Yongpo 王永珀
Personal information
- Full name: Wang Yongpo
- Date of birth: 19 January 1987 (age 39)
- Place of birth: Qingdao, Shandong, China
- Height: 1.76 m (5 ft 9 in)
- Position: Midfielder

Youth career
- 1998–2003: Shandong Luneng

Senior career*
Years	Team	Apps	(Gls)
2004–2016	Shandong Luneng	215	(48)
2017–2019	Tianjin Quanjian	61	(6)
2019	Shanghai Greenland Shenhua	4	(0)
2020–2022	Shenzhen FC	39	(2)

International career^{‡}
2001–2003	China U17		
2005–2007	China U20		
2009–2019	China	18	(8)
Medal record
Representing China
Men's football
EAFF Championship
Silver medal – second place	2013 South Korea	Team
Silver medal – second place	2015 China	Team
AFC U-17 Championship
Bronze medal – third place	2002 UAE	Team
- * Club domestic league appearances and goals as of 31 December 2022 ‡ National team caps and goals as of 25 March 2019

Wang Yongpo (Chinese: 王永珀; pinyin: Wáng Yǒngpò; Mandarin pronunciation: [wǎŋ.jʊ̀ŋ.pʰwô]; born 19 January 1987) is a Chinese former professional footballer.

== Club career ==
Wang Yongpo started his football career in 2004 when he was promoted from Shandong Luneng's youth academy to the club's first team squad. He made his debut for the club on 4 December 2004 in a 1-1 draw against Tianjin Teda. His progression within the team continued the following season when he made several appearances throughout the 2005 season. He would rise to prominence within the club during the 2007 season when teammate Zheng Zhi left the team to join Charlton Athletic. With significantly more playing time throughout the season, he played a key attacking role within the club. By the 2008 season he had become a vital player, playing 16 games and scoring seven goals for Shandong despite missing much of the season with a torn ligament.

On 8 February 2017, Wang transferred to fellow Chinese Super League side Tianjin Quanjian for 60 million Yuan on a three-year contract. He made his debut for the club on 4 March 2017 in a 2-0 loss against Guangzhou R&F. He would establish himself as a vital member of the team and aided them to their highest ever position of third and qualification to the AFC Champions League for the first time in their history. With his contract nearing its end on 30 July 2019, Wang transferred to fellow top tier side Shanghai Shenhua. After only a brief period with Shenhua, which saw him win the 2019 Chinese FA Cup, Wang would join another top tier club in Shenzhen F.C. on 25 February 2020.

== International career ==
Wang made his debut for the Chinese national team in a 1-0 win against Iran on 1 June 2009. He scored his first international goal on 6 June 2013 in a 2-1 loss against Uzbekistan.

== Career statistics ==
=== Club statistics ===
As of 31 December 2022.

Appearances and goals by club, season and competition
Club	Season	League			National Cup		League Cup		Continental		Other		Total	
Club	Season	Division	Apps	Goals	Apps	Goals	Apps	Goals	Apps	Goals	Apps	Goals	Apps	Goals
Shandong Luneng	2004	Chinese Super League	1	0	0	0	0	0	-		-		1	0
Shandong Luneng	2005	Chinese Super League	3	0	3	0	0	0	-		-		6	0
Shandong Luneng	2006	Chinese Super League	8	0	2	0	-		0	0	-		10	0
Shandong Luneng	2007	Chinese Super League	15	0	-		-		5	3	2 (Note: Appearances in A3 Champions Cup)	0	22	3
Shandong Luneng	2008	Chinese Super League	16	7	-		-		-		-		16	7
Shandong Luneng	2009	Chinese Super League	26	6	-		-		5	0	-		31	6
Shandong Luneng	2010	Chinese Super League	18	4	-		-		5	0	-		23	4
Shandong Luneng	2011	Chinese Super League	27	2	1	0	-		5	2	-		33	4
Shandong Luneng	2012	Chinese Super League	18	9	4	3	-		-		-		22	12
Shandong Luneng	2013	Chinese Super League	29	11	1	0	-		-		-		30	11
Shandong Luneng	2014	Chinese Super League	17	0	2	0	-		4	0	-		23	0
Shandong Luneng	2015	Chinese Super League	24	6	4	1	-		4	2	1 (Note: Appearances in Chinese FA Super Cup)	0	33	9
Shandong Luneng	2016	Chinese Super League	13	3	1	0	-		7	1	-		21	4
Shandong Luneng	Total		215	48	18	4	0	0	35	8	3	0	271	60
Tianjin Quanjian	2017	Chinese Super League	23	2	3	1	-		-		-		26	3
Tianjin Quanjian	2018	Chinese Super League	28	2	1	0	-		10	1	-		39	3
Tianjin Quanjian	2019	Chinese Super League	10	2	0	0	-		-		-		10	2
Tianjin Quanjian	Total		61	6	4	1	0	0	10	1	0	0	75	8
Shanghai Shenhua	2019	Chinese Super League	4	0	1	0	-		-		-		5	0
Shenzhen FC	2020	Chinese Super League	6	1	1	0	-		-		-		7	1
Shenzhen FC	2021	Chinese Super League	16	1	4	3	-		-		-		20	4
Shenzhen FC	2022	Chinese Super League	17	0	1	0	-		-		-		18	0
Shenzhen FC	Total		39	2	6	3	0	0	0	0	0	0	44	5
Career total			319	56	29	8	0	0	45	9	3	0	396	73

=== International statistics ===
National team
Year	Apps	Goals
2009	1	0
2010	0	0
2011	0	0
2012	0	0
2013	6	4
2014	1	0
2015	6	3
2016	0	0
2017	2	1
2018	0	0
2019	2	0
Total	18	8

=== International goals ===
As of 7 June 2017
Scores and results list China's goal tally first.

No	Date	Venue	Opponent	Score	Result	Competition
1.	6 June 2013	Hohhot City Stadium, Hohhot, China	Uzbekistan	1–0	1–2	Friendly
2.	15 June 2013	Hefei Olympic Sports Center Stadium, Hefei, China	Thailand	1–2	1–5	Friendly
3.	21 July 2013	Seoul World Cup Stadium, Seoul, South Korea	Japan	1–0	3–3	2013 EAFF East Asian Cup
4.	21 July 2013	Seoul World Cup Stadium, Seoul, South Korea	Japan	2–3	3–3	2013 EAFF East Asian Cup
5.	5 August 2015	Wuhan Sports Center Stadium, Wuhan, China	North Korea	2–0	2–0	2015 EAFF East Asian Cup
6.	12 November 2015	Helong Stadium, Changsha, China	Bhutan	9–0	12–0	2018 FIFA World Cup qualification
7.	12 November 2015	Helong Stadium, Changsha, China	Bhutan	11–0	12–0	2018 FIFA World Cup qualification
8.	7 June 2017	Tianhe Stadium, Guangzhou, China	Philippines	4–1	8–1	Friendly

== Honours ==
=== Club ===
Shandong Luneng

- Chinese Super League: 2006, 2008, 2010
- Chinese FA Cup: 2004, 2006, 2014
- Chinese Super League Cup: 2004
- Chinese FA Super Cup: 2015

Shanghai Shenhua

- Chinese FA Cup: 2019

=== Individual ===
- Chinese Super League Domestic Golden Boot winner: 2012
- Chinese Super League Team of the Year: 2012, 2013
