= Zhao Mingjian =

Chinese footballer (born 1987)

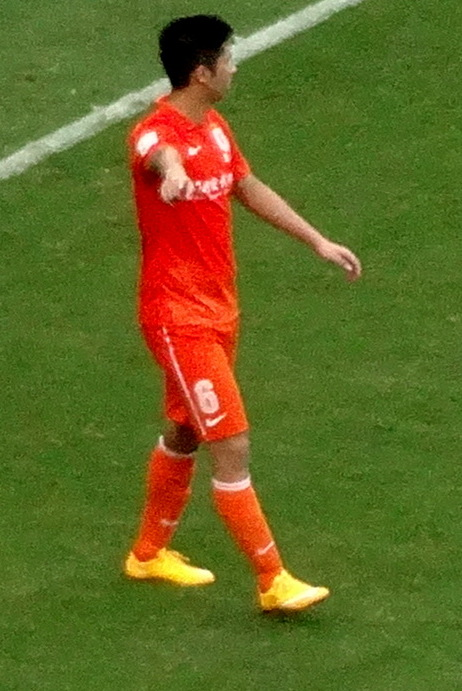

Personal information
- Full name: Zhao Mingjian
- Date of birth: 22 November 1987 (age 38)
- Place of birth: Dalian, Liaoning, China
- Height: 1.81 m (5 ft 11 1/2 in)
- Positions: Right-back; right midfielder

Youth career
- Dalian Shide

Senior career*
Years	Team	Apps	(Gls)
2005–2012	Dalian Shide	147	(3)
2013–2016	Shandong Luneng	53	(1)
2013	→ Changchun Yatai (loan)	13	(0)
2017–2018	Hebei China Fortune	52	(0)
2019	Dalian Yifang	7	(0)
2020–2022	Shanghai Shenhua	31	(3)
2022	→ Kunshan FC (loan)	15	(4)
2023	Shijiazhuang Gongfu	8	(1)
2023–2024	Foshan Nanshi	25	(1)
2024	Dalian Young Boy	15	(1)
Total		366	(14)

International career^{‡}
2016–2017	China	9	(0)
- * Club domestic league appearances and goals as of 31 December 2024 ‡ National team caps and goals as of 7 June 2017

Zhao Mingjian (Chinese: 赵明剑; pinyin: Zhào Míngjiàn; Mandarin pronunciation: [ʈʂâʊ mǐŋ.tɕjɛ̂n]; born 22 November 1987) is a Chinese former footballer who played as a right-back or right midfielder.

== Club career ==
Zhao Mingjian broke into the senior team of Dalian Shide at the beginning of the 2005 Chinese Super League season after graduating from their youth team. He would make his debut senior appearance for Dalian on 22 May 2005 against Shanghai Shenhua in a 2–1 defeat. As a promising midfielder Zhao Mingjian would play in several further games during the season and go on to win the league title and Chinese FA Cup with Dalian at the end of the league season. The following seasons he would gradually establish himself as a squad regular within the team, however it was during the 2008 Chinese Super League season when Zhao confirmed himself as a vital member within the club by playing in the majority of the season and also scoring his first league goal against Changchun Yatai on November 9, 2008, in a 3–2 defeat. He became one of the few constants within the team that went through a transitional period where several managers and many youth players came in during a very disappointing season which saw the team flirt with relegation. The following season saw him continue his role as the team's first choice right-midfielder and with a young squad saw the team finish in a more respectable eighth within the league. At the end of the 2012 Chinese Super League season Dalian Shide was sold off to rival football club Dalian Aerbin F.C. after the club's owner Xu Ming was arrested for bribery.

On 6 January 2013, Zhao joined fellow top-tier club Shandong Luneng for a reported 15 million Yuan. He would make his debut for the club in a league game on 14 May 2013, against Qingdao Jonoon F.C. in a 3–0 victory. Despite this victory Zhao struggled to gain a regular place within the team and he was loaned out to another Super League team in Changchun Yatai. At Changchun, Zhao would make his debut in a league game on 31 July 2013 against Qingdao Jonoon F.C. in a 1–1 draw. In his loan period Zhao would immediately establish himself as an integral member of the team that avoided relegation at the end of the season. On his return from his loan, Zhao would go on to establish himself within the Shandong team and go on to win the 2014 Chinese FA Cup with them.

On 23 February 2017, Zhao transferred to fellow Super League side Hebei China Fortune. He made his debut for Hebei on 5 March 2017 in the first match of the season which Hebei tied with Henan Jianye 0–0. After two season, Zhao joined his hometown club Dalian Yifang on 13 February 2019. He made his debut on 3 March 2019 in a league game against Henan Jianye F.C. in a 1–1 draw. At the end of the season he would only make a handful of games for the club and he was allowed to join Shanghai Shenhua on 24 January 2020. On 4 August 2022 he would be loaned out to second-tier club Kunshan where he established himself as regular within the team that won the division and promotion to the top tier at the end of the 2022 China League One campaign.

On 31 December 2024, Zhao announced his retirement from professional football through the social media.

== International career ==
Zhao made his debut for the Chinese national team on 24 March 2016 in a 4–0 win against Maldives.

== Career statistics ==
Statistics accurate as of match played 31 December 2024.

Appearances and goals by club, season and competition
Club	Season	League			National Cup		League Cup		Continental		Other		Total	
Club	Season	Division	Apps	Goals	Apps	Goals	Apps	Goals	Apps	Goals	Apps	Goals	Apps	Goals
Dalian Shide	2004	Chinese Super League	0	0	0	0	0	0	0	0	–		0	0
Dalian Shide	2005	Chinese Super League	5	0	4	0	1	0	–		–		10	0
Dalian Shide	2006	Chinese Super League	14	0	–		–		–		–		14	0
Dalian Shide	2007	Chinese Super League	18	0	–		–		–		–		18	0
Dalian Shide	2008	Chinese Super League	27	1	–		–		–		–		27	1
Dalian Shide	2009	Chinese Super League	20	2	–		–		–		–		20	2
Dalian Shide	2010	Chinese Super League	28	0	–		–		–		–		28	0
Dalian Shide	2011	Chinese Super League	8	0	0	0	–		–		–		8	0
Dalian Shide	2012	Chinese Super League	27	0	1	0	–		–		–		28	0
Dalian Shide	Total		147	3	5	0	1	0	0	0	0	0	153	3
Shandong Luneng	2013	Chinese Super League	2	0	2	0	–		–		–		4	0
Shandong Luneng	2014	Chinese Super League	14	0	3	0	–		4	0	–		21	0
Shandong Luneng	2015	Chinese Super League	17	1	1	0	–		4	0	1 (Note: Appearances in Chinese FA Super Cup)	0	23	1
Shandong Luneng	2016	Chinese Super League	20	0	2	0	–		8	1	–		30	1
Shandong Luneng	Total		53	1	8	0	0	0	16	1	1	0	78	2
Changchun Yatai (Loan)	2013	Chinese Super League	13	0	0	0	–		–		–		13	0
Hebei China Fortune	2017	Chinese Super League	26	0	1	0	–		–		–		27	0
Hebei China Fortune	2018	Chinese Super League	26	0	1	0	–		–		–		27	0
Hebei China Fortune	Total		52	0	2	0	0	0	0	0	0	0	54	0
Dalian Yifang	2019	Chinese Super League	7	0	0	0	–		–		–		7	0
Shanghai Shenhua	2020	Chinese Super League	12	1	1	0	–		0	0	–		13	1
Shanghai Shenhua	2021	Chinese Super League	16	2	6	1	–		–		–		22	3
Shanghai Shenhua	2022	Chinese Super League	3	0	0	0	–		–		–		3	0
Shanghai Shenhua	Total		31	3	7	1	0	0	0	0	0	0	38	4
Kunshan (Loan)	2022	China League One	15	4	0	0	–		–		–		13	1
Shijiazhuang Gongfu	2023	China League One	8	1	0	0	–		–		–		8	1
Dongguan United/ Foshan Nanshi	2023	China League One	15	0	0	0	–		–		–		15	0
Dongguan United/ Foshan Nanshi	2024	China League One	10	1	0	0	–		–		–		10	1
Dongguan United/ Foshan Nanshi	Total		25	1	0	0	0	0	0	0	0	0	25	1
Dalian Yingbo	2024	China League One	15	1	–		–		–		–		15	1
Total			366	14	22	1	1	0	16	1	1	0	406	16

== Honours ==
=== Club ===
Dalian Shide

- Chinese Super League: 2005
- Chinese FA Cup: 2005

Shandong Luneng

- Chinese FA Cup: 2014
- Chinese FA Super Cup: 2015

Kunshan

- China League One: 2022
