= Jin Jingdao =

Chinese footballer (born 1992)

Jin Jingdao 金敬道
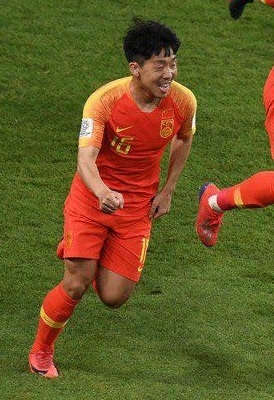

Personal information
- Date of birth: 18 November 1992 (age 33)
- Place of birth: Yanji, Jilin, China
- Height: 1.70 m (5 ft 7 in)
- Position: Midfielder

Senior career*
Years	Team	Apps	(Gls)
2010–2011	Yanbian FC	37	(3)
2012	Shenyang Shenbei	24	(0)
2013–2022	Shandong Taishan	177	(16)
Total		238	(19)

International career^{‡}
2009–2010	China U20	8	(4)
2011–2022	China	18	(1)
Medal record
Representing China
Men's football
EAFF Championship
Bronze medal – third place	2019 South Korea	Team
- * Club domestic league appearances and goals as of 31 January 2023 ‡ National team caps and goals as of 24 March 2022

Jin Jingdao
- Simplified Chinese: 金敬道
Transcriptions
Standard Mandarin
- Hanyu Pinyin: Jīn Jìngdào

Chinese Korean name
- Chosŏn'gŭl: 김경도
Transcriptions
- Revised Romanization: Gim Gyeongdo
- McCune–Reischauer: Kim Kyŏngdo

Jin Jingdao (Chinese: 金敬道; Korean: 김경도; born 18 November 1992) is a Chinese former professional footballer who played as a midfielder. In 2024, he was banned from football-related activities for life over allegations of match-fixing and other forms of corruption.

== Club career ==
Jin Jingdao started his football career with Yanbian FC in 2010. He made his debut for the club on 17 April 2010 in a 1–0 win against Guangdong Sunray Cave. He scored his first goal for the club on 15 May 2010 in a 2–1 win against Pudong Zobon. Jin transferred to China League One side Shenyang Shenbei for a fee of ¥2.3 million in January 2012.

On 27 February 2013, Jin transferred to Chinese Super League side Shandong Luneng (now renamed Shandong Taishan). He made his debut for the club on 16 March 2013 in a 2–0 win against Changchun Yatai. He made 18 appearances in his debut season for Shandong and won the Chinese Football Association Young Player of the Year award. The following season he would continued to be a vital member of the team and went on to win his first piece of silverware by winning the 2014 Chinese FA Cup with them.

On 8 September 2016, Jin was suspended temporarily for 60 days by the Asian Football Confederation after testing positive for the banned substance Clenbuterol in a 2016 AFC Champions League match against FC Seoul. On 4 November 2016, he received a final ban of eight months, which was reduced to three months until 8 December 2016.

On his return, Jin would immediately establish himself back into the team and scored his first goal in the Chinese Super League in a 2–0 win against Tianjin Teda on 9 July 2017. A consistent regular within the team, he would gain his second Chinese FA Cup by winning the 2020 Chinese FA Cup against Jiangsu Suning F.C. in a 2-0 victory. This would be followed by his first league title with the club when he was part of the team that won the 2021 Chinese Super League title. Another Chinese FA Cup would be followed up by him winning the 2022 Chinese FA Cup with them.

On 10 September 2024, the Chinese Football Association announced that Jin was banned from football-related activities in China for life for involving in match-fixing.

== International career ==
Jin was called up to the Chinese under-20 national team in June 2009 and was promoted to captain by the then manager Su Maozhen. He also played several matches during the 2010 AFC U-19 Championship. He made his debut for the Chinese national team on 26 March 2011 in a 2–2 draw against Costa Rica.

On 30 May 2021, Jin scored his first international goal in a 7-0 win over Guam in the 2022 FIFA World Cup qualification.

== Career statistics ==
=== Club ===
As of 31 January 2023.

Appearances and goals by club, season and competition
Club	Season	League			National Cup		Continental		Other		Total	
Club	Season	Division	Apps	Goals	Apps	Goals	Apps	Goals	Apps	Goals	Apps	Goals
Yanbian FC	2010	China League One	14	1	—		—		—		14	1
Yanbian FC	2011	China League One	23	2	4	0	—		—		27	2
Yanbian FC	Total		37	3	4	0	0	0	0	0	41	3
Shenyang Shenbei	2012	China League One	24	0	1	0	—		—		25	0
Shandong Luneng/ Shandong Taishan	2013	Chinese Super League	18	0	1	0	—		—		19	0
Shandong Luneng/ Shandong Taishan	2014	Chinese Super League	17	0	2	0	5	0	—		24	0
Shandong Luneng/ Shandong Taishan	2015	Chinese Super League	15	0	4	1	0	0	0 (Note: Appearances in Chinese FA Super Cup)	0	19	1
Shandong Luneng/ Shandong Taishan	2016	Chinese Super League	9	0	1	0	3	0	—		13	0
Shandong Luneng/ Shandong Taishan	2017	Chinese Super League	24	3	3	0	—		—		27	3
Shandong Luneng/ Shandong Taishan	2018	Chinese Super League	29	6	8	2	—		—		37	8
Shandong Luneng/ Shandong Taishan	2019	Chinese Super League	15	0	4	1	8	0	—		27	1
Shandong Luneng/ Shandong Taishan	2020	Chinese Super League	15	2	1	0	—		—		16	2
Shandong Luneng/ Shandong Taishan	2021	Chinese Super League	16	0	1	0	—		—		17	0
Shandong Luneng/ Shandong Taishan	2022	Chinese Super League	19	5	4	0	0	0	—		23	5
Shandong Luneng/ Shandong Taishan	Total		177	16	29	4	16	0	0	0	222	20
Total			238	19	34	4	16	0	0	0	288	23

=== International ===
National team
Year	Apps	Goals
2011	1	0
2012	0	0
2013	1	0
2014	0	0
2015	0	0
2016	0	0
2017	0	0
2018	5	0
2019	4	0
2020	0	0
2021	6	1
2022	1	0
Total	18	1

Scores and results list China's goal tally first.

No	Date	Venue	Opponent	Score	Result	Competition
1.	30 May 2021	Suzhou Olympic Sports Centre, Suzhou	Guam	2–0	7–0	2022 FIFA World Cup qualification

== Honours ==
Shandong Luneng/ Shandong Taishan

- Chinese Super League: 2021.
- Chinese FA Cup: 2014, 2020, 2021, 2022.
- Chinese FA Super Cup: 2015.

Individual

- Chinese Football Association Young Player of the Year: 2013
- Chinese Super League Team of the Year: 2018
