= Zhang Wenzhao =

Chinese footballer

Zhang Wenzhao 张文钊
Personal information
- Full name: Zhang Wenzhao
- Date of birth: 28 May 1987 (age 39)
- Place of birth: Anshan, Liaoning, China
- Height: 1.77 m (5 ft 10 in)
- Position: Left winger

Senior career*
| Years | Team | Apps | (Gls) |
| 2006–2008 | Shenzhen Kingway | 58 | (1) |
| 2009–2013 | Changchun Yatai | 125 | (21) |
| 2014–2016 | Shandong Luneng | 53 | (5) |
| 2016–2020 | Guangzhou Evergrande | 19 | (1) |
| 2019–2020 | → Beijing Renhe (loan) | 26 | (1) |

International career^{‡}
| 2011–2017 | China | 6 | (0) |
Medal record
Representing China
Men's football
EAFF Championship
| Bronze medal – third place | 2017 Japan | Team |
- * Club domestic league appearances and goals as of 31 December 2020 ‡ National team caps and goals as of 16 December 2017

Zhang Wenzhao (Chinese: 张文钊; pinyin: Zhāng Wénzhāo; Mandarin pronunciation: [ʈʂáŋ wə̌n ʈʂáʊ]; born 28 March 1987) is a Chinese former footballer.

== Club career ==
Zhang Wenzhao started his football career after graduating from Shenzhen Kingway in 2006. His ability to play on the left flank saw him establish himself within the team during the 2007 season. While playing as a regular for the club throughout the 2008 season, he was unable to help the club's struggles in the top tier.

Zhang attracted interest from fellow top tier side Changchun Yatai and he transferred to the club in the 2009 season. He made his debut for the club on 28 March 2009 in a 1–0 win against Jiangsu Sainty. It wasn't until Shen Xiangfu became manager during the 2010 season did Zhang become a regular for the club. He scored his first goal for the club on 7 May 2010 in a 3–2 loss against Henan Jianye.

In January 2014, Zhang signed with fellow top tier side Shandong Luneng. He made his debut for the club on 7 March 2014 in a 1–0 win against Harbin Yiteng. He scored his first goal for the club on 6 April 2014 in a 1-0 win against Shanghai Shenxin.

On 7 July 2016, Zhang transferred to fellow Chinese Super League side Guangzhou Evergrande. He made his debut for the club on 17 July 2016 in a 2–1 away win against Changchun Yatai, coming on for Gao Lin in the 76th minute. On 5 August 2017, he scored his first goal for Guangzhou in a 3–0 home win over Tianjin Teda. On 27 February 2019, Zhang was loaned to fellow top tier side Beijing Renhe for the 2019 season.

== International career ==
Zhang made his debut for the Chinese national team on 6 October 2011 in a 2-1 win against the United Arab Emirates.

== Career statistics ==
=== Club statistics ===
As of 31 December 2020.

Appearances and goals by club, season and competition
| Club | Season | League | | | National Cup | | Continental | | Other | | Total | |
| Club | Season | Division | Apps | Goals | Apps | Goals | Apps | Goals | Apps | Goals | Apps | Goals |
|---|---|---|---|---|---|---|---|---|---|---|---|---|
| Shenzhen Kingsway | 2006 | Chinese Super League | 12 | 0 | 1 | 0 | - | | - | | 13 | 0 |
| Shenzhen Kingsway | 2007 | Chinese Super League | 25 | 1 | - | | - | | - | | 25 | 1 |
| Shenzhen Kingsway | 2008 | Chinese Super League | 21 | 0 | - | | - | | - | | 21 | 0 |
| Shenzhen Kingsway | Total | | 58 | 1 | 1 | 0 | 0 | 0 | 0 | 0 | 59 | 1 |
| Changchun Yatai | 2009 | Chinese Super League | 11 | 0 | - | | - | | - | | 11 | 0 |
| Changchun Yatai | 2010 | Chinese Super League | 28 | 5 | - | | 5 | 0 | - | | 33 | 5 |
| Changchun Yatai | 2011 | Chinese Super League | 30 | 5 | 2 | 1 | - | | - | | 32 | 6 |
| Changchun Yatai | 2012 | Chinese Super League | 28 | 4 | 3 | 0 | - | | - | | 31 | 4 |
| Changchun Yatai | 2013 | Chinese Super League | 27 | 5 | 0 | 0 | - | | - | | 27 | 5 |
| Changchun Yatai | Total | | 125 | 21 | 5 | 1 | 5 | 0 | 0 | 0 | 135 | 22 |
| Shandong Luneng | 2014 | Chinese Super League | 28 | 4 | 6 | 2 | 2 | 0 | - | | 36 | 6 |
| Shandong Luneng | 2015 | Chinese Super League | 18 | 1 | 3 | 1 | 4 | 0 | 0 (Note: Appearances in Chinese FA Super Cup) | 0 | 25 | 2 |
| Shandong Luneng | 2016 | Chinese Super League | 7 | 0 | 0 | 0 | 8 | 0 | - | | 15 | 0 |
| Shandong Luneng | Total | | 53 | 5 | 9 | 3 | 14 | 0 | 0 | 0 | 76 | 8 |
| Guangzhou Evergrande | 2016 | Chinese Super League | 6 | 0 | 1 | 0 | - | | - | | 7 | 0 |
| Guangzhou Evergrande | 2017 | Chinese Super League | 4 | 1 | 3 | 0 | 2 | 0 | 0 | 0 | 9 | 1 |
| Guangzhou Evergrande | 2018 | Chinese Super League | 9 | 0 | 2 | 1 | 4 | 0 | 0 | 0 | 15 | 1 |
| Guangzhou Evergrande | Total | | 19 | 1 | 6 | 1 | 6 | 0 | 0 | 0 | 31 | 2 |
| Beijing Renhe (loan) | 2019 | Chinese Super League | 12 | 1 | 0 | 0 | - | | - | | 12 | 1 |
| Beijing Renhe (loan) | 2020 | China League One | 14 | 0 | 0 | 0 | - | | - | | 14 | 0 |
| Beijing Renhe (loan) | Total | | 26 | 1 | 0 | 0 | 0 | 0 | 0 | 0 | 26 | 1 |
| Career total | | | 281 | 29 | 21 | 5 | 25 | 0 | 0 | 0 | 327 | 34 |

=== International statistics ===
National team
| Year | Apps | Goals |
|---|---|---|
| 2011 | 1 | 0 |
| 2012 | 0 | 0 |
| 2013 | 0 | 0 |
| 2014 | 2 | 0 |
| 2015 | 1 | 0 |
| 2016 | 0 | 0 |
| 2017 | 2 | 0 |
| Total | 6 | 0 |

== Honours ==
=== Club ===
Shandong Luneng

- Chinese FA Cup: 2014
- Chinese FA Super Cup: 2015

Guangzhou Evergrande

- Chinese Super League: 2016, 2017
- Chinese FA Cup: 2016
- Chinese FA Super Cup: 2017, 2018
