= Zheng Zheng =

Chinese footballer

Zheng Zheng 郑铮
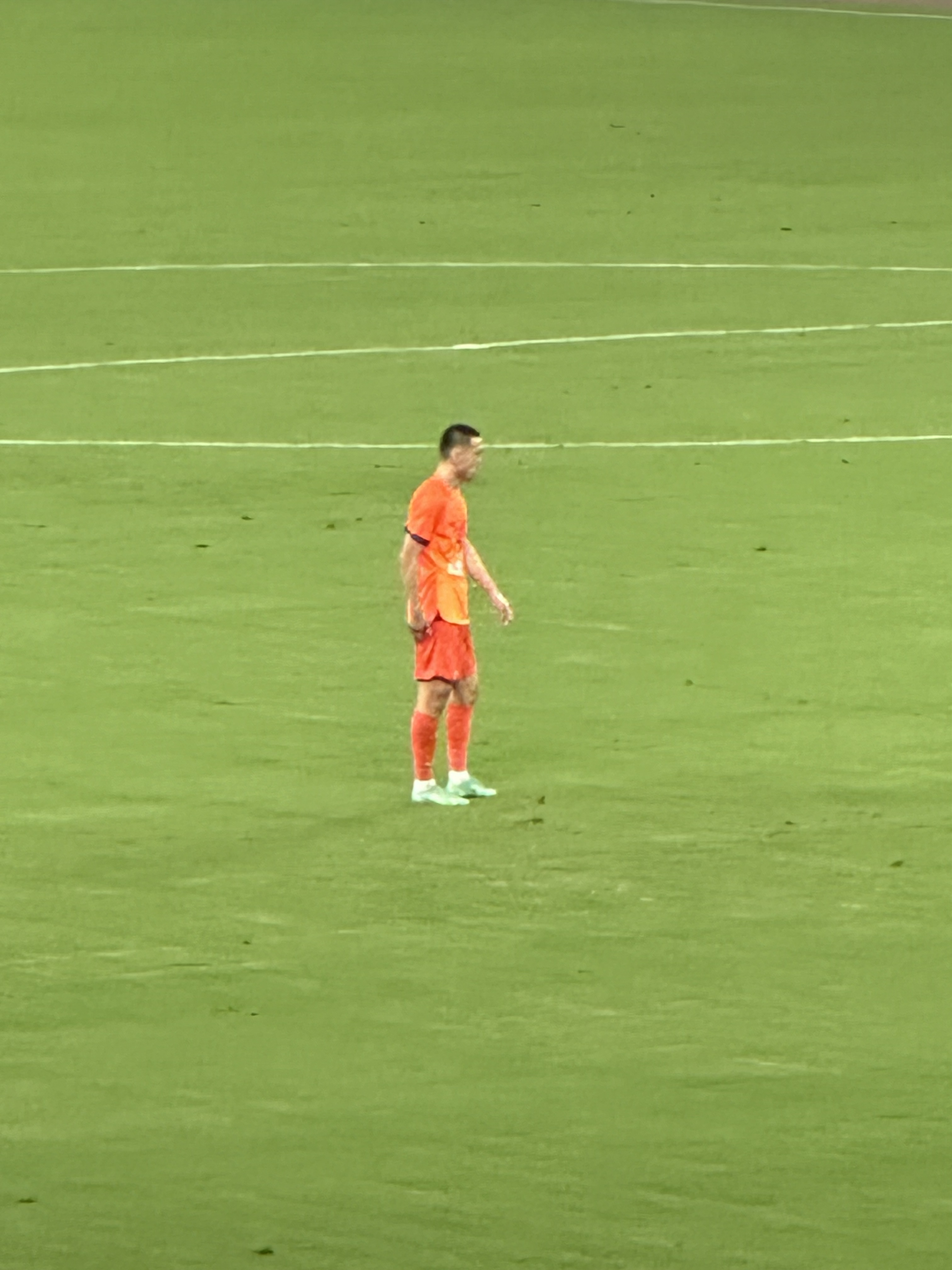
- Zheng Zheng in August 2024

Personal information
- Full name: Zheng Zheng
- Date of birth: 11 July 1989 (age 37)
- Place of birth: Jinan, Shandong, China
- Height: 1.86 m (6 ft 1 in)
- Positions: Left-back; centre-back

Team information
- Current team: Shandong Taishan
- Number: 5

Youth career
- 1999–2007: Shandong Luneng

Senior career*
Years	Team	Apps	(Gls)
2008–	Shandong Taishan	355	(11)

International career^{‡}
2007–2008	China U-19		
2009–2010	China U-23		
2011–2022	China	23	(2)
Medal record
Representing China
Men's football
EAFF Championship
Bronze medal – third place	2017 Japan	Team
- * Club domestic league appearances and goals as of 19 November 2026 ‡ National team caps and goals as of 29 March 2022

Zheng Zheng
- Simplified Chinese: 郑铮
- Traditional Chinese: 鄭錚
Transcriptions
Standard Mandarin
- Hanyu Pinyin: Zhèng Zhēng
- IPA: [ʈʂə̂ŋ ʈʂə́ŋ]

Zheng Zheng (Chinese: 郑铮; pinyin: Zhèng Zhēng; born 11 July 1989) is a Chinese professional footballer who plays as a left-back or centre-back for and captains Chinese Super League club Shandong Taishan. He joined Shandong's youth academy at the age of 10 and has spent his entire playing career there since making his debut in 2010.

== Club career ==
Zheng Zheng started his football career playing with Shandong Luneng's youth academy and was promoted to the first team during the 2008 season, where despite not making an appearance for the team he would still receive a league title medal from the club. He received his promotion to the senior team in 2010 when he made his debut for the club in a 1–0 loss against Pohang Steelers on 24 March 2010. Despite the defeat, Zheng would go on to become a vital member of the team and would go on to score his first goal for the club on 16 May 2010 in a 1–0 win against Shenzhen Ruby. Zheng would have such a breakthrough season that he would not only win the league title with Shandong, but also personally win the Chinese Football Association Young Player of the Year award to cap off an extremely successful season.

On 23 June 2016, Zheng suffered a rupture of ligament in his left knee in the training, ruling him out for the rest of the season. He made his return on 2 May 2017 in a 2017 Chinese FA Cup match against Jilin Baijia. A consistent regular within the team, he would gain his third league title with the club when he was part of the team that won the 2021 Chinese Super League title. On 30 October 2022, Zheng would show his importance towards the team when he made his 275 league appearance for Shandong in a 3-1 home win against Shanghai Port, becoming record league appearance maker for the club, surpassing former captain Shu Chang.

On 31 March 2024, Zheng made his 400th appearance for Shandong in a 3-0 home defeat against Shanghai Shenhua.

== International career ==
Zheng would play for the Chinese under-20 national team that took part in the 2008 AFC U-19 Championship where he played in all four games for China in a tournament where they were knocked out in the quarterfinals. Zheng would still move up to the Chinese under-23 national team where he played in the 2008 East Asian Games. He played in two games as China were knocked out in the group stage. Zheng would also make the squad that took part in the 2010 Asian Games; however, he was injured throughout the tournament and didn't make any appearances.

Zheng made his debut for the Chinese national team on 6 October 2011 in a 2-1 home win against United Arab Emirates in an international friendly match. Zheng scored his first two international goals on 15 November 2011 in a 4–0 away win against Singapore during 2014 FIFA World Cup qualification.

== Career statistics ==
=== Club ===
Statistics accurate as of match played 11 February 2025.

Appearances and goals by club, season and competition
Club	Season	League			National Cup		Continental		Other		Total	
Club	Season	Division	Apps	Goals	Apps	Goals	Apps	Goals	Apps	Goals	Apps	Goals
Shandong Luneng/ Shandong Taishan	2008	Chinese Super League	0	0	-		-		-		0	0
Shandong Luneng/ Shandong Taishan	2009	Chinese Super League	0	0	-		0	0	-		0	0
Shandong Luneng/ Shandong Taishan	2010	Chinese Super League	24	3	-		3	0	-		27	3
Shandong Luneng/ Shandong Taishan	2011	Chinese Super League	26	0	2	0	6	0	-		34	0
Shandong Luneng/ Shandong Taishan	2012	Chinese Super League	25	0	3	0	-		-		28	0
Shandong Luneng/ Shandong Taishan	2013	Chinese Super League	28	3	0	0	-		-		28	3
Shandong Luneng/ Shandong Taishan	2014	Chinese Super League	25	0	7	0	6	0	-		38	0
Shandong Luneng/ Shandong Taishan	2015	Chinese Super League	25	1	2	0	6	0	1 (Note: Appearances in Chinese FA Super Cup)	0	34	1
Shandong Luneng/ Shandong Taishan	2016	Chinese Super League	10	0	1	0	9	1	-		20	1
Shandong Luneng/ Shandong Taishan	2017	Chinese Super League	19	0	3	0	-		-		22	0
Shandong Luneng/ Shandong Taishan	2018	Chinese Super League	23	0	5	0	-		-		28	0
Shandong Luneng/ Shandong Taishan	2019	Chinese Super League	16	0	3	0	4	0	-		23	0
Shandong Luneng/ Shandong Taishan	2020	Chinese Super League	17	0	3	0	-		-		20	0
Shandong Luneng/ Shandong Taishan	2021	Chinese Super League	20	1	7	1	-		-		27	2
Shandong Luneng/ Shandong Taishan	2022	Chinese Super League	24	2	5	0	0	0	-		29	2
Shandong Luneng/ Shandong Taishan	2023	Chinese Super League	28	0	4	0	8	0	1	0	41	0
Shandong Luneng/ Shandong Taishan	2024	Chinese Super League	19	1	5	4	6	1	-		30	3
Shandong Luneng/ Shandong Taishan	Total		329	11	50	2	48	2	2	0	429	15
Career total			329	11	50	2	48	2	2	0	429	15

=== International statistics ===
National team
Year	Apps	Goals
2011	2	2
2012	2	0
2013	3	0
2014	2	0
2015	0	0
2016	0	0
2017	5	0
2018	3	0
2019	2	0
2020	0	0
2021	1	0
2022	3	0
Total	23	2

=== International goals ===
#	Date	Venue	Opponent	Score	Result	Competition
1	15 November 2011	Jalan Besar Stadium, Singapore	Singapore	3–0	4–0	2014 FIFA World Cup qualifier
2	15 November 2011	Jalan Besar Stadium, Singapore	Singapore	4–0	4–0	2014 FIFA World Cup qualifier

== Honours ==
Shandong Luneng/Shandong Taishan

- Chinese Super League: 2008, 2010, 2021
- Chinese FA Cup: 2014, 2020, 2021, 2022
- Chinese FA Super Cup: 2015

Individual

- Chinese Football Association Young Player of the Year: 2010
- Chinese Super League Team of the Year: 2012, 2013, 2014
