= 2017 EAFF E-1 Football Championship Final squads =

The following is a list of squads for each nation competing in 2017 EAFF E-1 Football Championship Final in Tokyo, Japan. Each nation must submit a squad of 23 players, including 3 goalkeepers.

Age, caps and goals as of the start of the tournament, 9 December 2017.

== China ==
Head coach: (Italy) Marcello Lippi

No.	Pos.	Player	Date of birth (age)	Caps	Goals	Club
1	GK	Yan Junling	28 January 1991 (aged 26)	6	0	(Chinese Football Association) Shanghai SIPG
12	GK	Shi Xiaotian	6 March 1990 (aged 27)	1	0	(Chinese Football Association) Liaoning FC
23	GK	Wang Dalei	10 January 1989 (aged 28)	24	0	(Chinese Football Association) Shandong Luneng
2	DF	Liu Yiming	28 February 1995 (aged 22)	0	0	(Chinese Football Association) Tianjin Quanjian
3	DF	He Guan	25 January 1993 (aged 24)	1	0	(Chinese Football Association) Shanghai SIPG
4	DF	Fan Xiaodong	2 March 1987 (aged 30)	2	0	(Chinese Football Association) Changchun Yatai
6	DF	Gao Zhunyi	21 August 1995 (aged 22)	2	0	(Chinese Football Association) Hebei China Fortune
14	DF	Fu Huan	12 July 1993 (aged 24)	2	0	(Chinese Football Association) Shanghai SIPG
16	DF	Zheng Zheng	11 July 1989 (aged 28)	11	2	(Chinese Football Association) Shandong Luneng
17	DF	Li Xuepeng	18 September 1988 (aged 29)	25	0	(Chinese Football Association) Guangzhou Evergrande
21	DF	Deng Hanwen	8 January 1995 (aged 22)	5	2	(Chinese Football Association) Beijing Renhe
5	MF	Liao Lisheng	29 April 1993 (aged 24)	4	0	(Chinese Football Association) Guangzhou Evergrande
7	MF	Zhao Xuri (captain)	3 December 1985 (aged 32)	72	2	(Chinese Football Association) Tianjin Quanjian
8	MF	Zhao Yuhao	7 April 1993 (age 33)	1	0	(Chinese Football Association) Hebei China Fortune
10	MF	Yin Hongbo	30 October 1989 (aged 28)	7	1	(Chinese Football Association) Hebei China Fortune
11	MF	Zhang Wenzhao	28 May 1987 (aged 30)	4	0	(Chinese Football Association) Guangzhou Evergrande
13	MF	He Chao	19 April 1995 (aged 22)	0	0	(Chinese Football Association) Changchun Yatai
15	MF	Wu Xi	19 February 1989 (aged 28)	45	3	(Chinese Football Association) Jiangsu Suning
19	MF	Zheng Long	15 April 1988 (aged 29)	10	4	(Chinese Football Association) Guangzhou Evergrande
9	FW	Xiao Zhi	28 May 1985 (aged 32)	6	2	(Chinese Football Association) Guangzhou R&F
18	FW	Yang Liyu	13 February 1997 (aged 20)	0	0	(Chinese Football Association) Tianjin TEDA
20	FW	Wei Shihao	8 April 1995 (aged 22)	0	0	(Chinese Football Association) Shanghai SIPG
22	FW	Yu Dabao (vice-captain)	17 April 1988 (aged 29)	42	15	(Chinese Football Association) Beijing Guoan

== Japan ==
Head coach: (Bosnia and Herzegovina) Vahid Halilhodžić

No.	Pos.	Player	Date of birth (age)	Caps	Goals	Club
1	GK	Masaaki Higashiguchi	12 May 1986 (aged 31)	3	0	(Japan Football Association) Gamba Osaka
12	GK	Kōsuke Nakamura	27 February 1995 (aged 22)	0	0	(Japan Football Association) Kashiwa Reysol
23	GK	Shūichi Gonda	3 March 1989 (aged 28)	3	0	(Japan Football Association) Sagan Tosu
3	DF	Gen Shōji (captain)	11 December 1992 (aged 24)	6	0	(Japan Football Association) Kashima Antlers
4	DF	Shōgo Taniguchi	15 July 1991 (aged 26)	2	0	(Japan Football Association) Kawasaki Frontale
5	DF	Shintarō Kurumaya	5 April 1992 (aged 25)	1	0	(Japan Football Association) Kawasaki Frontale
6	DF	Genta Miura	1 March 1995 (aged 22)	0	0	(Japan Football Association) Gamba Osaka
19	DF	Ryō Hatsuse	10 July 1997 (aged 20)	0	0	(Japan Football Association) Gamba Osaka
20	DF	Sei Muroya	5 April 1995 (aged 22)	0	0	(Japan Football Association) FC Tokyo
21	DF	Shūto Yamamoto	1 June 1985 (aged 32)	0	0	(Japan Football Association) Kashima Antlers
22	DF	Naomichi Ueda	24 October 1994 (aged 23)	0	0	(Japan Football Association) Kashima Antlers
2	MF	Yōsuke Ideguchi	23 August 1996 (aged 21)	7	1	(Japan Football Association) Gamba Osaka
8	MF	Yōjiro Takahagi	2 August 1986 (aged 31)	2	0	(Japan Football Association) FC Tokyo
10	MF	Ryota Oshima	23 January 1993 (aged 24)	1	0	(Japan Football Association) Kawasaki Frontale
13	MF	Shoma Doi	21 May 1992 (aged 25)	0	0	(Japan Football Association) Kashima Antlers
16	MF	Kento Misao	19 April 1996 (aged 21)	0	0	(Japan Football Association) Kashima Antlers
17	MF	Yasuyuki Konno	25 January 1983 (aged 34)	90	4	(Japan Football Association) Gamba Osaka
7	FW	Shū Kurata	26 November 1988 (aged 29)	6	2	(Japan Football Association) Gamba Osaka
9	FW	Kengo Kawamata	14 October 1989 (aged 28)	5	1	(Japan Football Association) Jubilo Iwata
11	FW	Yu Kobayashi	23 September 1987 (aged 30)	8	0	(Japan Football Association) Kawasaki Frontale
14	FW	Jun'ya Itō	9 March 1993 (aged 24)	0	0	(Japan Football Association) Kashiwa Reysol
15	FW	Mū Kanazaki	16 February 1989 (aged 28)	10	2	(Japan Football Association) Kashima Antlers
18	FW	Hiroyuki Abe	5 July 1989 (aged 28)	0	0	(Japan Football Association) Kawasaki Frontale

== North Korea ==
Head coach: (Norway) Jørn Andersen

No.	Pos.	Player	Date of birth (age)	Caps	Goals	Club
1	GK	Ri Myong-guk (captain)	9 September 1986 (aged 31)	93	0	(DPR Korea Football Association) Pyongyang City
13	GK	Sin Hyok	3 July 1992 (aged 25)	0	0	(DPR Korea Football Association) Kigwancha
22	GK	Ri Kwang-il	13 April 1988 (aged 29)	6	0	(DPR Korea Football Association) Sobaeksu
2	DF	Sim Hyon-jin	1 January 1991 (aged 26)	32	1	(DPR Korea Football Association) April 25
3	DF	Jang Kuk-chol	16 February 1994 (aged 23)	39	3	(DPR Korea Football Association) Hwaebul
4	DF	Pak Myong-song	31 March 1994 (aged 23)	15	0	(DPR Korea Football Association) April 25
6	DF	Kang Kuk-chol	1 July 1990 (aged 27)	34	0	(DPR Korea Football Association) Pyongyang City
7	DF	Kim Song-gi	23 October 1988 (aged 29)	6	0	(Japan Football Association) Machida Zelvia
15	DF	Kim Chol-bom	16 July 1994 (aged 23)	6	0	(DPR Korea Football Association) April 25
18	DF	Ri Yong-chol	8 January 1991 (aged 26)	31	0	(DPR Korea Football Association) Hwaebul
20	DF	Song Kum-il	10 May 1994 (aged 23)	4	0	(DPR Korea Football Association) Rimyongsu
5	MF	Ri Un-chol	13 July 1995 (aged 22)	3	0	(DPR Korea Football Association) Sonbong
8	MF	Kim Kuk-bom	19 February 1995 (aged 22)	10	0	(DPR Korea Football Association) Ryomyong
9	MF	Pak Song-chol	24 September 1987 (aged 30)	53	14	(DPR Korea Football Association) Rimyongsu
14	MF	Kang Kuk-chol	29 September 1999 (aged 18)	5	0	(DPR Korea Football Association) Ryomyong
16	MF	Ri Yong-jik	8 February 1991 (aged 26)	11	1	(Japan Football Association) Kamatamare Sanuki
17	MF	Myong Cha-hyon	20 March 1990 (aged 27)	11	3	(DPR Korea Football Association) April 25
19	MF	Choe Ju-song	27 January 1996 (aged 21)	3	0	(DPR Korea Football Association) Amrokkang
21	MF	Yun Il-gwang	1 April 1993 (aged 24)	4	0	(DPR Korea Football Association) April 25
10	FW	An Byong-jun	22 May 1990 (aged 27)	8	0	(Japan Football Association) Roasso Kumamoto
11	FW	Jong Il-gwan	30 October 1992 (aged 25)	53	15	(Swiss Football Association) FC Luzern
12	FW	Jang Ok-chol	14 January 1994 (aged 23)	0	0	(DPR Korea Football Association) Kigwancha
23	FW	Kim Yu-song	24 January 1995 (aged 22)	10	7	(DPR Korea Football Association) April 25

== South Korea ==
Head coach: Shin Tae-yong

No.	Pos.	Player	Date of birth (age)	Caps	Goals	Club
1	GK	Kim Jin-hyeon	6 July 1987 (aged 30)	13	0	(Japan Football Association) Cerezo Osaka
21	GK	Jo Hyeon-woo	25 September 1991 (aged 26)	1	0	(Korea Football Association) Daegu FC
23	GK	Kim Dong-jun	19 December 1994 (aged 22)	0	0	(Korea Football Association) Seongnam FC
2	DF	Choi Chul-soon	18 February 1987 (aged 30)	8	0	(Korea Football Association) Jeonbuk Hyundai Motors
3	DF	Kim Jin-su	13 June 1992 (aged 25)	28	0	(Korea Football Association) Jeonbuk Hyundai Motors
4	DF	Jung Seung-hyun	3 April 1994 (aged 23)	0	0	(Japan Football Association) Sagan Tosu
5	DF	Kwon Kyung-won	31 January 1992 (aged 25)	2	1	(Chinese Football Association) Tianjin Quanjian
6	DF	Yun Young-sun	4 October 1988 (aged 29)	1	0	(Korea Football Association) Sangju Sangmu
12	DF	Kim Min-woo	25 February 1990 (aged 27)	13	1	(Korea Football Association) Suwon Samsung Bluewings
14	DF	Go Yo-han	10 March 1988 (aged 29)	13	0	(Korea Football Association) FC Seoul
20	DF	Jang Hyun-soo (captain)	28 September 1991 (aged 26)	42	3	(Japan Football Association) FC Tokyo
7	MF	Yun Il-lok	7 March 1992 (aged 25)	8	1	(Korea Football Association) FC Seoul
8	MF	Lee Myung-joo	24 April 1990 (aged 27)	15	1	(Korea Football Association) FC Seoul
11	MF	Lee Keun-ho	11 April 1985 (aged 32)	80	19	(Korea Football Association) Gangwon FC
13	MF	Ju Se-jong	30 October 1990 (aged 27)	6	1	(Korea Football Association) FC Seoul
15	MF	Lee Chang-min	20 January 1994 (aged 23)	1	0	(Korea Football Association) Jeju United
16	MF	Jung Woo-young	14 December 1989 (aged 27)	19	0	(Chinese Football Association) Chongqing Lifan
17	MF	Lee Jae-sung	10 August 1992 (aged 25)	24	4	(Korea Football Association) Jeonbuk Hyundai Motors
19	MF	Yeom Ki-hun	30 March 1983 (aged 34)	54	4	(Korea Football Association) Suwon Samsung Bluewings
22	MF	Kim Sung-joon	8 April 1988 (aged 29)	0	0	(Korea Football Association) Seongnam FC
9	FW	Kim Shin-wook	14 April 1988 (aged 29)	38	3	(Korea Football Association) Jeonbuk Hyundai Motors
10	FW	Lee Jeong-hyeop	24 June 1991 (aged 26)	19	5	(Korea Football Association) Busan IPark
18	FW	Jin Seong-uk	16 November 1993 (aged 24)	0	0	(Korea Football Association) Jeju United
