= Elias (footballer, born 1987) =

Brazilian footballer

Personal information
- Full name: Elias Constantino Pereira Filho
- Date of birth: 13 February 1987 (age 39)
- Place of birth: Campos dos Goytacazes, Brazil
- Height: 1.82 m (6 ft 0 in)
- Position: Forward

Team information
- Current team: Madureira

Senior career*
Years	Team	Apps	(Gls)
2008	São João da Barra		
2009	Americano	2	(0)
2010–2014	Resende	60	(17)
2010	→ Duque de Caxias (loan)	1	(0)
2011	→ Madureira (loan)	7	(3)
2012	→ Bahia (loan)	16	(1)
2013–2014	→ Botafogo (loan)	28	(10)
2014–2015	Jiangsu Sainty	28	(7)
2015	Nova Iguaçu	4	(1)
2015–2016	Figueirense	12	(0)
2016	Sampaio Corrêa	15	(4)
2017	CRB	16	(5)
2017	Cuiabá	13	(4)
2018	São Bento	2	(0)
2018	Juventude	19	(3)
2019	Villa Nova	8	(3)
2019	América Mineiro	0	(0)
2020–	Jacuipense	14	(4)
- * Club domestic league appearances and goals as of 21:38, 5 October 2020 (UTC)

Elias Constantino Pereira Filho (born 13 February 1987), simply known as Elias, is a Brazilian footballer who plays for Madureira as a forward.

== Honours ==
Madureira

- Copa Rio: 2011

CRB

- Campeonato Alagoano: 2017
