= Zhao Yuhao =

Chinese footballer (born 1993)

Zhao Yuhao 赵宇豪
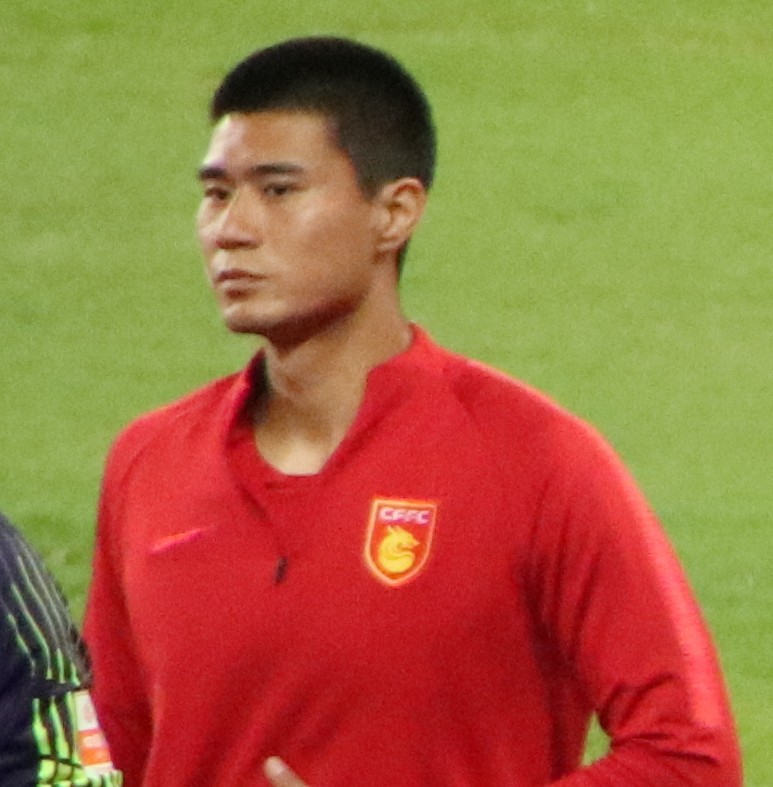
- Zhao Yuhao in 2019

Personal information
- Full name: Zhao Yuhao
- Date of birth: 7 April 1993 (age 33)
- Place of birth: Kunming, Yunnan, China
- Height: 1.85 m (6 ft 1 in)
- Positions: Defender; defensive midfielder

Team information
- Current team: Yunnan Yukun
- Number: 6

Youth career
- Hangzhou Greentown

Senior career*
Years	Team	Apps	(Gls)
2011	Wenzhou Provenza	8	(0)
2013–2016	Hangzhou Greentown	55	(0)
2017–2021	Hebei FC	63	(1)
2021	→ Henan Songshan Longmen (loan)	7	(0)
2022–2023	Henan FC	25	(2)
2024–	Yunnan Yukun	61	(0)

International career^{‡}
	China U19	12	(0)
	China U23	10	(0)
2017–	China	3	(0)
Medal record
Representing China
Men's football
EAFF Championship
Bronze medal – third place	2017 Japan	Team
- * Club domestic league appearances and goals as of 19 November 2026 ‡ National team caps and goals as of 16 December 2017

Zhao Yuhao (Chinese: 赵宇豪; pinyin: Zhào Yǔháo; Mandarin pronunciation: [ʈʂâʊ ỳ xǎʊ]; born 7 April 1993) is a Chinese footballer who currently plays as a defender or defensive midfielder for Yunnan Yukun in the Chinese Super League.

== Club career ==
Zhao started his professional football career in 2011 when he was loaned to China League Two club Wenzhou Provenza from Hangzhou Greentown for one year. He was promoted to Hangzhou Greentown's first team squad by Takeshi Okada in 2013. On 22 May 2013, he made his debut for Hangzhou in the third round of 2013 Chinese FA Cup against amateur team Wuhan Hongxin in a 1–0 home victory. His Super League debut came on 21 September 2013 in a game against Wuhan Zall.

In January 2017, Zhao moved to Super League side Hebei China Fortune after Hangzhou's relegation. He made his debut for Hebei on 5 March 2017 in the first match of the season which Hebei tied with Henan Jianye 0–0. On 7 May 2017, he scored his first senior goal in a 4–1 away win against Beijing Guoan.

On 8 April 2021, Zhao joined fellow top tier club Henan Songshan Longmen (later renamed simply Henan) on loan for the start of the 2021 Chinese Super League campaign. He would make his debut for Henan on 27 April 2021 in a league game against Cangzhou Mighty Lions in a 0–0 draw. For the next league campaign he would make his move to Henan permanent on 29 April 2022. This would be followed by his first goal for the club, which was in a league game on 4 June 2022 against Dalian Professional in a 2-2 draw.

On February 21 2024, second tier Yunnan Yukun Football Club officially announced the signing of Zhao Yuhao.

On 12 October 2024, Yunnan Yukun sealed the 2024 China League One title with three league matches left to play, with a 3–0 win against Suzhou Dongwu.

== International career ==
On 10 November 2017, Zhao made his debut for the Chinese national team in a 2–0 loss against Serbia.

== Career statistics ==
Statistics accurate as of match played 31 December 2025.

Appearances and goals by club, season and competition
Club	Season	League			National Cup		Continental		Other		Total	
Club	Season	Division	Apps	Goals	Apps	Goals	Apps	Goals	Apps	Goals	Apps	Goals
Wenzhou Provenza	2011	China League Two	8	0	-		-		-		8	0
Hangzhou Greentown	2013	Chinese Super League	2	0	3	0	-		-		5	0
Hangzhou Greentown	2014	Chinese Super League	18	0	2	0	-		-		20	0
Hangzhou Greentown	2015	Chinese Super League	18	0	2	0	-		-		20	0
Hangzhou Greentown	2016	Chinese Super League	17	0	0	0	-		-		17	0
Hangzhou Greentown	Total		55	0	7	0	0	0	0	0	62	0
Hebei China Fortune	2017	Chinese Super League	24	1	1	0	-		-		25	1
Hebei China Fortune	2018	Chinese Super League	13	0	2	0	-		-		15	0
Hebei China Fortune	2019	Chinese Super League	12	0	1	0	-		-		13	0
Hebei China Fortune	2020	Chinese Super League	14	0	1	0	-		-		15	0
Hebei China Fortune	Total		63	1	5	0	0	0	0	0	68	1
Henan Songshan Longmen (loan)	2021	Chinese Super League	7	0	4	0	-		-		11	0
Henan Songshan Longmen/ Henan	2022	Chinese Super League	11	1	0	0	-		-		11	1
Henan Songshan Longmen/ Henan	2023	Chinese Super League	14	1	2	0	-		-		16	1
Henan Songshan Longmen/ Henan	Total		25	2	2	0	0	0	0	0	27	2
Yunnan Yukun	2024	China League One	22	0	1	1	-		-		23	1
Yunnan Yukun	2025	Chinese Super League	22	0	3	0	-		-		25	0
Yunnan Yukun	Total		44	0	4	1	0	0	0	0	48	1
Career total			202	3	22	1	0	0	0	0	224	4

== Honours ==
Yunnan Yukun

- China League One: 2024
