= Li Gang (footballer) =

Chinese footballer

Li Gang 李钢
Personal information
- Date of birth: August 27, 1981 (age 45)
- Place of birth: Dalian, Liaoning, China
- Height: 1.87 m (6 ft 2 in)
- Position: Midfielder

Team information
- Current team: Dalian Yingbo (assistant coach)

Senior career*
Years	Team	Apps	(Gls)
2002–2007	Shanghai United	67	(3)
2007–2009	Shanghai Shenhua	23	(0)
2009	→ Chengdu Blades (loan)	10	(0)
2010–2011	Chengdu Blades	32	(4)
2012–2013	Wuhan Zall	36	(1)
2014–2015	Jiangxi Liansheng	22	(1)
2016–2017	Hainan Seamen	28	(0)
2018	Shanxi Longjin		
2019	Shaanxi UKD		
2022	Dalian Duxing		

Managerial career
- 2022–: Dalian Yingbo (assistant)
- * Club domestic league appearances and goals as of 14 October 2017

Li Gang (Chinese: 李钢; pinyin: Li Gāng; born 27 August 1981) is a Chinese football coach and former player as a midfielder.

== Club career ==
Li Gang would start his career in 2002 with one of the local football clubs in Dalian, Dalian Sidelong in the second tier where he would go on to establish himself as a regular within the team by playing in twenty three league games within the 2003 league season. He would then see the club move to Shanghai and rename themselves Shanghai United at the end of the 2004 league season when the club also won promotion to the Chinese Super League after coming second within the league. Li Gang would help establish himself and his team the following season when his team came eleventh in the league. However at the beginning of the 2007 league season Shanghai United and Shanghai Shenhua merged with Shanghai Shenhua keeping their name.

At Shanghai Shenhua Li Gang would make his debut on March 7, 2007 against Sydney FC in the 2007 AFC Champions League group game that saw Shanghai Shenhua lose 2-1. With the former Shanghai United coach Osvaldo Giménez managing the team Li Gang would quickly established himself as a regular within the first team despite the significantly large squad and played in fifteen league games within the season as well as also winning the 2007 A3 Champions Cup, which was a mini tournament held during the summer break sanctioned by the East Asian Football Federation. At the beginning of the 2008 league season Wu Jingui was already brought back as Shenhua's manager and despite the large the exist of players at the beginning of the season Li Gang lost favour within the Shanghai team and saw his playing time significantly limited to only five league appearances throughout the season.

After losing his place within the Shenhua team Li Gang would join Chengdu Blades on loan during the 2009 league season where he quickly established himself as a regular within the team and played in ten league games for the club. Before the start of the 2010 league season it was discovered that several years before Chengdu Blades had fixed several league games and were punished with relegation to the second tier. Despite this Li Gang would make his loan move permanent and would play in seventeen league games to help push the club to win promotion at the end of the 2010 league season when he aided the club to a runners-up position. Back in the top tier Li Gang was named the club's captain during the 2011 Chinese Super League season, however he was unable to lead the team to safety and the club were relegated at the end of the season.

In March 2016, Li transferred to China League Two club Hainan Seamen.

== Honours ==
Shanghai Shenhua

- A3 Champions Cup: 2007

Jiangxi Liansheng

- China League Two: 2014
