= 2007 A3 Champions Cup =

Tournament details
- Host country: China
- Dates: 7 – 13 June
- Teams: 4 (from 1 confederation)
- Venue: 1 (in 1 host city)

Final positions
- Champions: (China) Shanghai Shenhua (1st title)
- Runners-up: (China) Shandong Luneng
- Third place: (Japan) Urawa Red Diamonds
- Fourth place: (South Korea) Seongnam Ilhwa Chunma

Tournament statistics
- Matches played: 6
- Goals scored: 21 (3.5 per match)
- Attendance: 148,000 (24,667 per match)
- Top scorer(s): (Brazil) Washington (Urawa Reds, 3 goals)
- Best player(s): (China) Li Gang (Shanghai Shenhua)

The fifth edition of the A3 Champions Cup took place between June 7 and June 13, 2007, at the Shandong Stadium in Jinan.

== Participants ==
- (South Korea) Seongnam Ilhwa Chunma - 2006 K-League champions.
- (Japan) Urawa Red Diamonds - 2006 J. League champions.
- (China) Shandong Luneng Taishan - 2006 Chinese Super League champions.
- (China) Shanghai Shenhua - 2006 Chinese Super League runners-up (invitee).

== Table ==
Pos	Team	Pld	W	D	L	GF	GA	GD	Pts
1	(China) Shanghai Shenhua	3	2	0	1	7	3	+4	6
2	(China) Shandong Luneng Taishan	3	2	0	1	7	6	+1	6
3	(Japan) Urawa Red Diamonds	3	1	0	2	5	7	-2	3
4	(South Korea) Seongnam Ilhwa Chunma	3	1	0	2	2	5	-3	3

NB: Teams are ranked on goal-difference

== Results ==
NB: All times are UTC+8.

Round 1

June 7, 2007
18:00

Shanghai Shenhua (China)	3–0	(South Korea) Seongnam Ilhwa Chunma
Ricard 12'; Li Gang 61'; Alonso 75'

Shandong Stadium, Jinan
Attendance: 20,000
Referee: Nobutsugu Murakami
June 7, 2007
20:30

Shandong Luneng Taishan (China)	4–3	(Japan) Urawa Red Diamonds
Zheng Zhi 34'; Shu Chang 58'; Živković 73'; Zhou Haibin 84'		Hasebe 16'; Washington 89', 90'

Shandong Stadium, Jinan
Attendance: 31,000
Referee: Lee Young-Chul

Round 2

June 10, 2007
16:00

Urawa Red Diamonds (Japan)	1–0	(South Korea) Seongnam Ilhwa Chunma
Washington 39'

Shandong Stadium, Jinan
Attendance: 15,000
Referee: Wang Xueqing
June 10, 2007
18:30

Shandong Luneng Taishan (China)	2–1	(China) Shanghai Shenhua
Živković 11' (pen); Zheng Zhi 35'		Alonso (pen) 82'

Shandong Stadium, Jinan
Attendance: 15,000
Referee: Ko Keum-bok

Round 3

June 13, 2007
18:00

Urawa Red Diamonds (Japan)	1–3	(China) Shanghai Shenhua
Tulio Tanaka 58'		Ricard 10'; Chang Lin 30'; Li Gang 39'

Shandong Stadium, Jinan
Attendance: 31,000
Referee: Lee Young-Chul
June 13, 2007
20:30

Shandong Luneng Taishan (China)	1–2	(South Korea) Seongnam Ilhwa Chunma
Wang Xiaolong 80'		Kim Sang-Sik 33'; Choi Sung-Kuk 41'

Shandong Stadium, Jinan
Attendance: 36,000
Referee: Toshimitsu Yoshida

== Awards ==
=== Winners ===
A3 Champions Cup 2007 Winners

Shanghai Shenhua
First title

=== Individual awards ===
Top Goalscorers	Most Valuable Player
(Brazil) Washington (Urawa Reds)	(China) Li Gang (Shanghai)

== Goalscorers ==
Pos	Player	Team	Goals
1.	(Brazil) Washington	(Japan) Urawa Red Diamonds	3
2.	(Uruguay) Diego Alonso	(China) Shanghai Shenhua	2
2.	(China) Li Gang	(China) Shanghai Shenhua	2
2.	(Colombia) Hamilton Ricard	(China) Shanghai Shenhua	2
2.	(China) Zheng Zhi	(China) Shandong Luneng Taishan	2
2.	(Serbia) Aleksandar Živković	(China) Shandong Luneng Taishan	2
7.	(South Korea) Choi Sung-Kuk	(South Korea) Seongnam Ilhwa Chunma	1
7.	(South Korea) Kim Sang-Sik	(South Korea) Seongnam Ilhwa Chunma	1
7.	(China) Shu Chang	(China) Shandong Luneng Taishan	1
7.	(China) Zhou Haibin	(China) Shandong Luneng Taishan	1
7.	(China) Wang Xiaolong	(China) Shandong Luneng Taishan	1
7.	(China) Chang Lin	(China) Shanghai Shenhua	1
7.	(Japan) Makoto Hasebe	(Japan) Urawa Red Diamonds	1
7.	(Japan) Marcus Tulio Tanaka	(Japan) Urawa Red Diamonds	1
