= 2018 Jiangsu Suning F.C. season =

Jiangsu Suning
- Manager: Fabio Capello (until 28 March); Cosmin Olăroiu (from 28 March)
- Stadium: Nanjing Olympic Sports Centre
- Super League: 5th
- FA Cup: Quarter-finals
- Top goalscorer: League: Alex Teixeira (13); All: Alex Teixeira (15)
- Highest home attendance: 48,973 vs Shanghai Greenland Shenhua (22 April 2018)
- Lowest home attendance: 27,469 vs Chongqing Dangdai Lifan (15 August 2018)
Home colours	Away colours

The 2018 Jiangsu Suning season was Jiangsu Suning's 10th season in the Chinese Super League and 21st overall in the Chinese top flight. They also competed in the Chinese FA Cup.

== Season events ==
After finishing 12th in the 2017 Chinese Super League, Jiangsu Suning started their 10th consecutive season in the Chinese top flight, also competing in the Chinese FA Cup and starting the competition from the fourth round. On 25 July 2018, after a 2–3 loss on aggregate to Guangzhou R&F, they were eliminated from the cup. They finished in 5th place in the league, failing to achieve an Asian Champions League qualification spot.

== Current squad ==
=== First team ===
As of 13 July 2018

Note: Flags indicate national team as defined under FIFA eligibility rules; some limited exceptions apply. Players may hold more than one non-FIFA nationality.

No.	Pos.	Nation	Player
1	GK	CHN	Gu Chao
2	DF	CHN	Li Ang
3	MF	CHN	Tian Yinong
5	DF	CHN	Zhou Yun
6	DF	CHN	Yang Boyu
9	FW	ITA	Éder
10	MF	BRA	Alex Teixeira
11	MF	CHN	Xie Pengfei
12	MF	CHN	Zhang Xiaobin
13	FW	CHN	Tao Yuan
14	MF	CHN	Nan Xiaoheng
15	MF	CHN	Gao Dalun
16	MF	CHN	Gao Tianyi
18	MF	CHN	Zhang Lingfeng
19	GK	CHN	Zhang Yan

No.	Pos.	Nation	Player
20	MF	CHN	Abduhamit Abdugheni
21	DF	CHN	Cao Haiqing
22	MF	CHN	Wu Xi (captain)
23	GK	CHN	Li Haitao
24	MF	CHN	Ji Xiang
25	GK	CHN	Jiang Hao
26	GK	CHN	Zhang Jinyi
27	MF	CHN	Yang Jiawei
28	DF	CHN	Yang Xiaotian
29	DF	ITA	Gabriel Paletta
32	FW	CHN	Huang Zichang
33	MF	CHN	Wang Song
37	DF	CHN	Liang Jinhu
44	DF	CHN	Huang Jiajun
54	DF	CHN	Xie Xiaofan

=== Reserves ===
Note: Flags indicate national team as defined under FIFA eligibility rules; some limited exceptions apply. Players may hold more than one non-FIFA nationality.

No.	Pos.	Nation	Player
7	MF	BRA	Ramires
8	MF	CHN	Liu Jianye
31	MF	CHN	Wu Fan
36	GK	CHN	Qi Yuxi
41	DF	CHN	Shang Kefeng
42	DF	CHN	Qiu Yitao
43	DF	CHN	Zhu Qinggui
45	MF	CHN	Hu Zhifeng
46	GK	CHN	Meng Zuhang
47	DF	CHN	Xu Youzhi
48	MF	CHN	Zhang Xinlin

No.	Pos.	Nation	Player
49	MF	CHN	Meng Zhen
50	FW	CHN	Ge Wei
51	FW	CHN	Ni Yin
52	FW	CHN	Xu Chunqing
55	DF	CHN	Wang Xijie
56	MF	CHN	Hu Shengjia
57	MF	CHN	Lian Fa
58	DF	CHN	Yao Ben
59	MF	CHN	Zhu Jiahao
60	MF	CHN	Xie Zhiwei

=== Out on loan ===
Note: Flags indicate national team as defined under FIFA eligibility rules; some limited exceptions apply. Players may hold more than one non-FIFA nationality.

No.	Pos.	Nation	Player
—	DF	CHN	Li Shizhou (at Zhejiang Yiteng until 31 December 2018)
—	DF	KOR	Hong Jeong-ho (at Jeonbuk Hyundai Motors until 31 December 2018)

No.	Pos.	Nation	Player
—	MF	CHN	Chen Ji (at Guizhou Hengfeng until 31 December 2018)
—	FW	CMR	Benjamin Moukandjo (at Beijing Renhe until 31 December 2018)

== Transfers ==
=== In ===
Pos.	Player	Moving from	Type	Source
Winter
MF	(China) Tian Yinong	(China) Yanbian Funde	Transfer	
MF	(China) Zhang Lingfeng	(Portugal) União Torreense	Transfer	
MF	(China) Abduhamit Abdugheni	(China) Xinjiang Tianshan Leopard	Transfer	
DF	(Italy) Gabriel Paletta	(Italy) Milan	Sign as free agent	
FW	(Ghana) Richmond Boakye	(Serbia) Red Star Belgrade	Transfer	
Summer
FW	(Italy) Éder	(Italy) Internazionale	Transfer	
GK	(China) Zhang Yan	(China) Beijing Sinobo Guoan	Transfer	

=== Out ===
Pos.	Player	Moving to	Type	Source
Winter
DF	(Australia) Trent Sainsbury	(Switzerland) Grasshopper	Loan	
MF	(Colombia) Roger Martínez	(Spain) Villarreal	Loan	
MF	(China) Cao Kang	(China) Heilongjiang Lava Spring	Transfer	
DF	(South Korea) Hong Jeong-ho	(South Korea) Jeonbuk Hyundai Motors	Loan	
MF	(China) Chen Ji	(China) Guizhou Hengfeng	Loan	
GK	(China) Zhang Sipeng	(China) Guizhou Hengfeng	Transfer	
FW	(China) Gao Di	(China) Shanghai Greenland Shenhua	Loan return	
FW	(Cameroon) Benjamin Moukandjo	(China) Beijing Renhe	Loan	
DF	(China) Li Shizhou	(China) Zhejiang Yiteng	Loan	
DF	(China) Liu Wei	(China) Nantong Zhiyun	Transfer	
Summer
MF	(Colombia) Roger Martínez	(Mexico) América	Transfer	
MF	(China) Zhong Yi	(China) Fujian Tianxin	Transfer	
FW	(Ghana) Richmond Boakye	(Serbia) Red Star Belgrade	Transfer	

== Friendlies ==
=== Spain training sessions ===
16 January 2018 Friendly	Jiangsu Suning (China)	0–2	(Germany) VSG Altglienicke	Marbella, Spain
16:00 (UTC+1)		[ Report]	8'; 41'

20 January 2018 Friendly	Jiangsu Suning (China)	1–1	(Gibraltar) Europa FC	Marbella, Spain
16:00 (UTC+1)	Zhang Lingfeng 51'	[ Report]

24 January 2018 Friendly	Jiangsu Suning (China)	0–8	(Bulgaria) CSKA Sofia	Marbella, Spain
16:00 (UTC+1)	Li Ang (red card) 45'	[ Report]	Despodov 17', 65' (pen.), 68'; Karanga 36'; Alberg 42'; Zhivkov 84'; Atanasov 88'; Manolev 90' (pen.)

28 January 2018 Friendly	Jiangsu Suning (China)	1–3	(Romania) Steaua București	Mijas, Spain
16:00 (UTC+1)	Erpan Ezimjan 81'	[ Report]	Budescu 15', 50', 54'	Stadium: La Cala Resort

=== Dubai training sessions ===
6 February 2018 Friendly	Jiangsu Suning (China)	1–0	(Ukraine) Shakhtar Donetsk	Dubai, United Arab Emirates
14:00 (UTC+3)	Cao Haiqing 77'	Report		Stadium: Rashid Stadium

13 February 2018 Friendly	Jiangsu Suning (China)	5–1	(United Arab Emirates) Emirates	Dubai, United Arab Emirates
17:00 (UTC+3)

=== Italy training sessions ===
12 June 2018 Friendly	Giovani Via Nova (Italy)	1–8	(China) Jiangsu Suning	Pieve a Nievole, Italy
				Stadium: La Palagina

15 June 2018 Friendly	Dream Team^{1} (Italy)	3–2	(China) Jiangsu Suning	Pistoia, Italy
				Stadium: Stadio Marcello Melani

20 June 2018 Friendly	Jiangsu Suning (China)	2–0	(Hungary) Budapest Honvéd	Crema, Italy
16:00 (UTC+2)				Stadium: Stadio Giuseppe Voltini

23 June 2018 Friendly	Jiangsu Suning (China)	0–4	(China) Guangzhou Evergrande	Crema, Italy
19:00 (UTC+2)				Stadium: Stadio Giuseppe Voltini

24 June 2018 Friendly	Pergolettese (Italy)	0–4	(China) Jiangsu Suning	Crema, Italy
16:00 (UTC+2)				Stadium: Stadio Giuseppe Voltini

27 June 2018 Friendly	Jiangsu Suning (China)	2–0	(Italy) Bustese Milano City	Appiano Gentile, Italy
19:00 (UTC+2)				Stadium: Suning Training Centre

- ^1 Selection of Serie D clubs from Tuscany.

=== 2018 Clubs Super Cup ===
11 July 2018 Friendly	Jiangsu Suning (China)	2–3	(England) Southampton	Xuzhou, China
20:00 (UTC+8)	Zhang Lingfeng 29'; Richmond Boakye 35'	Report	Manolo Gabbiadini 26'; Nathan Redmond 43'; Sam Gallagher 77'	Stadium: Xuzhou Olympic Sports Centre Stadium

== Competitions ==
=== Chinese Super League ===
==== League table ====
Pos	Team	Pld	W	D	L	GF	GA	GD	Pts	Qualification or relegation
3	Shandong Luneng Taishan	30	17	7	6	57	39	+18	58	Qualification to Champions League play-off round
4	Beijing Sinobo Guoan (Note: Beijing Sinobo Guoan qualified for the 2019 AFC Champions League group stage as 2018 Chinese FA Cup winners.)	30	15	8	7	64	45	+19	53	Qualification to Champions League group stage
5	Jiangsu Suning	30	13	9	8	48	33	+15	48	
6	Hebei China Fortune	30	10	9	11	46	50	−4	39	
7	Shanghai Greenland Shenhua	30	10	8	12	44	53	−9	38	

Source: League table
Rules for classification: 1) Points; 2) Head-to-head points; 3) Head-to-head goal difference; 4) Head-to-head goals scored; 5) Reserve league points; 6) U19 Elite league points; 7) Goal difference; 8) Goals scored; 9) Disciplinary points (1 point for each yellow card, 3 points for each red card); 10) Draw

==== Results by round ====
Round	1	2	3	4	5	6	7	8	9	10	11	12	13	14	15	16	17	18	19	20	21	22	23	24	25	26	27	28	29	30
Ground	A	H	A	H	A	A	H	A	H	H	A	H	A	H	A	H	A	H	A	H	H	A	H	A	A	H	A	H	A	H
Result	W	L	L	W	W	D	W	L	W	W	L	D	D	D	W	W	L	D	D	W	D	D								
Position	4	7	12	8	6	6	4	6	5	4	4	5	5	5	5	5	5	5	5	5	5	5	5							

Updated to match(es) played on 16 September 2018. Source: Competitive matches
A = Away; H = Home; W = Win; D = Draw; L = Loss

==== Results summary ====
Overall								Home						Away					
Pld	W	D	L	GF	GA	GD	Pts	W	D	L	GF	GA	GD	W	D	L	GF	GA	GD
22	9	8	5	29	21	+8	35	6	4	1	18	7	+11	3	4	4	11	14	−3

Last updated: 15 September 2018.
Source: Competitive matches

==== Matches ====
4 March 2018 1	Guizhou Hengfeng	1–3	Jiangsu Suning	Guiyang
15:30 (UTC+8)	Yang Ting (yellow card) 26'; Tang Xin (yellow card) 41'; Trawally 45'; Fan Yunlong (yellow card) 47'; Festus (yellow card) 53'	Report	Teixeira 8', 80'; Huang Zichang 13', (yellow card) 69'; Tian Yinong (yellow card) 46'	Stadium: Guiyang Olympic Sports Center; Attendance: 28,573; Referee: Zhang Lei

11 March 2018 2	Jiangsu Suning	1–2	Beijing Sinobo Guoan	Nanjing
19:35 (UTC+8)	Ji Xiang 68'; Zhang Xiaobin (yellow card) 71'	Report	Wei Shihao 22'; Bakambu (yellow card) 43', (goal) 62'; Hou Sen (yellow card) 81'	Stadium: Nanjing Olympic Sports Centre; Attendance: 32,133; Referee: Shi Zhenlu

17 March 2018 3	Chongqing Dangdai Lifan	4–1	Jiangsu Suning	Chongqing
19:35 (UTC+8)	Fernando Henrique 17'; Liu Weidong 24', 73'; Ding Jie (yellow card) 26', (goal) 59'	Report	Yang Xiaotian (yellow card) 28'; Teixeira 32'; Liu Jianye (yellow card) 41'; Ji Xiang (yellow card) 52'	Stadium: Chongqing Olympic Sports Centre; Attendance: 31,568; Referee: Wang Zhe

1 April 2018 4	Jiangsu Suning	2–1	Tianjin TEDA	Nanjing
19:35 (UTC+8)	Ji Xiang (yellow card) 20'; Zhou Yun (yellow card) 21'; Li Ang (yellow card) 31'; Boakye 75' (pen.); Teixeira 77'	Report	Gao Jiarun (yellow card) 42'; Bai Yuefeng (yellow card) 48'; Johnathan 81'	Stadium: Nanjing Olympic Sports Centre; Attendance: 35,673; Referee: Li Haixin

6 April 2018 5	Guangzhou R&F	0–2	Jiangsu Suning	Guangzhou
19:35 (UTC+8)	Xiao Zhi (yellow card) 20'; Jiang Jihong (yellow card) 39'	Report	Huang Zichang 48'; Teixeira 60' (pen.); Tian Yinong (yellow card) 71'	Stadium: Yuexiushan Stadium; Attendance: 10,428; Referee: Shen Yinhao

13 April 2018 6	Tianjin Quanjian	1–1	Jiangsu Suning	Tianjin
19:35 (UTC+8)	Wang Yongpo 5'; Wang Jie (yellow card) 69'; Liu Yiming (yellow card) 69'	Report	Boakye 84'; Li Ang (yellow card) 90+4'	Stadium: Haihe Educational Football Stadium; Attendance: 6,618; Referee: Huang Yejun

22 April 2018 7	Jiangsu Suning	5–1	Shanghai Greenland Shenhua	Nanjing
18:00 (UTC+8)	Huang Zichang 7'; Wu Xi 23'; Ji Xiang 41'; Xie Pengfei 52'; Li Ang 64'	Report	Rong Hao 29'; Bai Jiajun (yellow card) 40'; Aidi (yellow card) 63'	Stadium: Nanjing Olympic Sports Centre; Attendance: 48,973; Referee: Wang Zhe

28 April 2018 8	Guangzhou Evergrande Taobao	1–0	Jiangsu Suning	Guangzhou
19:35 (UTC+8)	Yu Hanchao 90+1', (yellow card) 90+1'	Report	Ji Xiang (yellow card) 84'; Tian Yinong (yellow card) 86'	Stadium: Tianhe Stadium; Attendance: 47,492; Referee: Marco Guida (Italy)

6 May 2018 9	Jiangsu Suning	2–0	Changchun Yatai	Nanjing
19:35 (UTC+8)	Teixeira 32'; Li Ang (yellow card) 35'; Tian Yinong (yellow card) 45+1'; Huang Zichang 53'; Zhou Yun (yellow card) 54'	Report	Marinho (yellow card) 63'; Li Guang (yellow card) 74'	Stadium: Nanjing Olympic Sports Centre; Attendance: 29,179; Referee: Ai Kun

13 May 2018 10	Jiangsu Suning	1–0	Dalian Yifang	Nanjing
19:35 (UTC+8)	Huang Zichang 58'	Report		Stadium: Nanjing Olympic Sports Centre; Attendance: 30,756; Referee: Huang Yejun

20 May 2018 11	Shanghai SIPG	2–0	Jiangsu Suning	Shanghai
20:00 (UTC+8)	Wu Lei 48'; Wang Shenchao (yellow card) 66'; Cai Huikang (yellow card) 73'; Oscar 90'	Report	Ji Xiang (yellow card) 35'; Huang Zichang (yellow card) 61'; Boakye (yellow card) 70'; Paletta (yellow card) 80'	Stadium: Shanghai Stadium; Attendance: 20,555; Referee: Bart Vertenten (Belgium)

17 July 2018 12	Jiangsu Suning	0–0	Beijing Renhe	Nanjing
19:35 (UTC+8)	Zhou Yun (yellow card) 44'; Boakye (yellow card) 57'	Report	Chen Jie (yellow card) 22'; Shi Liang (yellow card) 57' (yellow-red card) 72'; Wang Gang (yellow card) 64'; Zhang Lie (yellow card) 74'; Luo Xin (yellow card) 88'	Stadium: Nanjing Olympic Sports Centre; Attendance: 29,233; Referee: Li Haixin

22 July 2018 13	Hebei China Fortune	0–0	Jiangsu Suning	Langfang
19:35 (UTC+8)	Gao Zhunyi (yellow card) 86'	Report	Yang Xiaotian (yellow card) 34'	Stadium: Langfang Stadium; Attendance: 15,233; Referee: Ai Kun

28 July 2018 14	Jiangsu Suning	1–1	Shandong Luneng Taishan	Nanjing
19:35 (UTC+8)	Éder 43', (yellow card) 54'; Ji Xiang (yellow card) 53'	Report	Li Ang 14' (o.g.); Zhang Chi (yellow card) 41' (yellow-red card) 89'; Wang Tong (yellow card) 48'	Stadium: Nanjing Olympic Sports Centre; Attendance: 39,793; Referee: Hee-Gon Kim

1 August 2018 15	Henan Jianye	0–1	Jiangsu Suning	Zhengzhou
19:35 (UTC+8)	Feng Zhuoyi (yellow card) 21'; Yang Kuo (yellow card) 45'; Wu Yan (yellow card) 86'; Karanga (red card) 90+8'	Report	Li Ang 17'; Zhang Lingfeng (yellow card) 20'; Éder (yellow card) 28'; Zhou Yun (yellow card) 75'	Stadium: Zhengzhou Hanghai Stadium; Attendance: 19,766; Referee: Zhao Zhizhi

5 August 2018 16	Jiangsu Suning	3–1	Guizhou Hengfeng	Nanjing
19:35 (UTC+8)	Boakye 72'; Wu Xi 74'; Zhang Xiaobin 90'; Wang Song (yellow card) 90+5'	Report	Han Pengfei (yellow card) 10'; Zheng Kaimu 65'	Stadium: Nanjing Olympic Sports Centre; Attendance: 28,965; Referee: Lin Jun

10 August 2018 17	Beijing Sinobo Guoan	3–1	Jiangsu Suning	Beijing
19:35 (UTC+8)	Zhang Xizhe 21'; Lei Tenglong 51'; Viera (yellow card) 60', (goal) 81'; Chi Zhongguo (yellow card) 89'	Report	Yang Boyu (yellow card) 35'; Zhang Yu 77' (o.g.); Tian Yinong (yellow card) 87'	Stadium: Workers Stadium; Attendance: 37,113; Referee: Kim Woo-Sung

15 August 2018 18	Jiangsu Suning	0–0	Chongqing Dangdai Lifan	Nanjing
19:35 (UTC+8)	Boakye (yellow card) 54'	Report	Peng Xinli (yellow card) 66'; Deng Xiaofei (yellow card) 90+3'	Stadium: Nanjing Olympic Sports Centre; Attendance: 27,469

18 August 2018 19	Tianjin TEDA	1–1	Jiangsu Suning	Tianjin
19:35 (UTC+8)	Zhao Honglüe (yellow card) 34'; Guo Hao 37'; Bastians (yellow card) 39'	Report	Yang Boyu (yellow card) 11'; Éder 19'; Teixeira (yellow card) 72'	Stadium: Tianjin Olympic Center Stadium; Attendance: 15,160

26 August 2018 20	Jiangsu Suning	2–0	Guangzhou R&F	Nanjing
19:35 (UTC+8)	Tian Yinong (yellow card) 44'; Éder 73' (pen.), (yellow card) 90+1'; Teixeira 90+4'	Report	Li Tixiang 72'	Stadium: Nanjing Olympic Sports Centre; Attendance: 27,361; Referee: Huang Yejun

2 September 2018 21	Jiangsu Suning	1–1	Tianjin Quanjian	Nanjing
19:35 (UTC+8)	Teixeira 19', (yellow card) 79'; Li Ang (yellow card) 59'; Gao Tianyi (yellow card) 64'; Gu Chao (yellow card) 77'	Report	Wang Jie (yellow card) 7'; Wang Xiaolong (yellow card) 66'; Su Yuanjie 81'; Wang Yongpo 83'	Stadium: Nanjing Olympic Sports Centre; Referee: Zhao Zhizhi

15 September 2018 22	Shanghai Greenland Shenhua	1–1	Jiangsu Suning	Shanghai
19:35 (UTC+8)		Report		Stadium: Hongkou Football Stadium

22 September 2018 23	Jiangsu Suning	2-3	Guangzhou Evergrande	Nanjing
19:35 (UTC+8)	Éder 1'; Li Ang 8'	Report	Paulinho 63'; Talisca 73'; Talisca 78'	Stadium: Nanjing Olympic Sports Centre

29 September 2018 24	Changchun Yatai	–	Jiangsu Suning	Changchun
15:30 (UTC+8)		Report		Stadium: Changchun City Stadium

6 October 2018 25	Dalian Yifang	–	Jiangsu Suning	Dalian
15:30 (UTC+8)		Report		Stadium: Dalian Sports Center

21 October 2018 26	Jiangsu Suning	–	Shanghai SIPG	Nanjing
19:35 (UTC+8)		Report		Stadium: Nanjing Olympic Sports Centre

27 October 2018 27	Beijing Renhe	–	Jiangsu Suning	Beijing
15:30 (UTC+8)		Report		Stadium: Fengtai Stadium

3 November 2018 28	Jiangsu Suning	–	Hebei China Fortune	Nanjing
19:35 (UTC+8)		Report		Stadium: Nanjing Olympic Sports Centre

7 November 2018 29	Shandong Luneng Taishan	–	Jiangsu Suning	Jinan
19:35 (UTC+8)		Report		Stadium: Jinan Olympic Sports Center Stadium

11 November 2018 30	Jiangsu Suning	–	Henan Jianye	Nanjing
15:00 (UTC+8)		Report		Stadium: Nanjing Olympic Sports Centre

=== Chinese FA Cup ===
25 April 2018 Fourth Round	Sichuan Longfor	0–1	Jiangsu Suning	Dujiangyan City
19:35 (UTC+8)			Chen Shaoqin 90' (o.g.)	Stadium: Dujiangyan Phoenix Stadium; Attendance: 6,876; Referee: Zhang Chao

1 May 2018 Fifth Round	Tianjin Quanjian	2–2 (7–8 p)	Jiangsu Suning	Tianjin
19:35 (UTC+8)	Mi Haolun 89'; Witsel 90+3'		Alex Teixeira 54', 68' (pen.)	Stadium: Haihe Educational Football Stadium; Attendance: 10,062; Referee: Shi Zhenlu
	Penalties
	Anthony Modeste (penalty missed); Wang Yongpo (penalty scored); Zhao Xuri (penalty scored); Kwon Kyung-won (penalty scored); Axel Witsel (penalty scored); Wang Xiaolong (penalty scored); Mi Haolun (penalty scored); Sun Ke (penalty scored); Chu Jinzhao (penalty missed)		(penalty scored) Alex Teixeira; (penalty scored) Li Ang; (penalty scored) Gao Tianyi; (penalty scored) Ji Xiang; (penalty missed) Gabriel Paletta; (penalty scored) Yang Xiaotian; (penalty scored) Tian Yinong; (penalty scored) Zhang Xiaobin; (penalty scored) Huang Zichang

8 July 2018 Quarter-Finals 1st Leg	Jiangsu Suning	0–0	Guangzhou R&F	Nanjing
19:00 (UTC+8)				Stadium: Nanjing Olympic Sports Centre; Referee: Wang Jing

25 July 2018 Quarter-Finals 2nd Leg	Guangzhou R&F	3–2 (3–2 agg.)	Jiangsu Suning	Guangzhou
20:00 (UTC+8)	Zhang Chenlong 21'; Li Tixiang (yellow card) 33'; Zahavi 42', 90+7' (pen.)		Ji Xiang 18', (yellow card) 74'; Li Ang (yellow card) 25'; Xie Pengfei 55'; Paletta (red card) 90+8'	Stadium: Yuexiushan Stadium; Attendance: 9,386; Referee: Shi Zhenlu

== Squad statistics ==
As of match played 2 September 2018

=== Goal scorers ===
Rank	Position	Nation	Number	Player	League	Cup	Total
1	MF	(Brazil)	10	Alex Teixeira	8	2	10
2	FW	(China)	32	Huang Zichang	5	0	5
3	FW	(Italy)	9	Éder	3	0	3
3	MF	(China)	24	Ji Xiang	2	1	3
3	FW	(Ghana)	38	Richmond Boakye	3	0	3
5	DF	(China)	2	Li Ang	2	0	2
5	MF	(China)	11	Xie Pengfei	1	1	2
5	MF	(China)	22	Wu Xi	2	0	2
7	DF	(China)	12	Zhang Xiaobin	1	0	1
Own goal					1	1	2
Total					28	5	33

=== Disciplinary record ===
No.	Nation	Position	Player	Super League			FA Cup			Total		
No.	Nation	Position	Player	Booked	(yellow card) (yellow-red card)	Sent off (straight red)	Booked	(yellow card) (yellow-red card)	Sent off (straight red)	Booked	(yellow card) (yellow-red card)	Sent off (straight red)
1	(China)	GK	Gu Chao	1						1		
2	(China)	DF	Li Ang	4			1			5		
3	(China)	MF	Tian Yinong	6						6		
5	(China)	DF	Zhou Yun	4						4		
6	(China)	DF	Yang Boyu	2						2		
8	(China)	MF	Liu Jianye	1						1		
9	(Italy)	FW	Éder	3						3		
10	(Brazil)	FW	Alex Teixeira	2						2		
12	(China)	MF	Zhang Xiaobin	1						1		
16	(China)	MF	Gao Tianyi	1						1		
18	(China)	MF	Zhang Lingfeng	1						1		
24	(China)	MF	Ji Xiang	5			1			6		
28	(China)	DF	Yang Xiaotian	1						1		
29	(Italy)	DF	Gabriel Paletta	1					1	1		1
32	(China)	FW	Huang Zichang	2						2		
33	(China)	MF	Wang Song	1						1		
38	(Ghana)	FW	Richmond Boakye	3						3		
Total				39	0	0	2	0	1	41	0	1
