= 2017 Chinese FA Super Cup =

Guangzhou Evergrande	Jiangsu Suning
1	0
- Date: 25 February 2017
- Venue: Chongqing Olympic Sports Center, Chongqing
- Man of the Match: (Brazil) Alan Carvalho
- Referee: Wang Di
- Attendance: 49,560
- Weather: Overcast / 8°C

Chang'an Ford 2017 Chinese FA Super Cup (Chinese: 长安福特2017中国足球协会超级杯) was the 15th Chinese FA Super Cup, an annual football match contested by the winners of the previous season's Chinese Super League and FA Cup competitions. The match was played at Chongqing Olympic Sports Center on 25 February 2017, and contested by league and cup double winners Guangzhou Evergrande Taobao and league runners-up Jiangsu Suning. Guangzhou Evergrande won the match 1–0 with a goal from Alan Carvalho. It was Guangzhou Evergrande's third outright victory in the Chinese FA Super Cup, drawing level with Dalian Shide and Shanghai Shenhua.

== Match ==
=== Details ===
25 February 2017
20:00 UTC+8

Guangzhou Evergrande Taobao	1–0	Jiangsu Suning
Alan 35'

Olympic Sports Center, Chongqing
Attendance: 49,560
Referee: Wang Di (Shanghai)

Guangzhou	Jiangsu

GK	19	(China) Zeng Cheng
RB	12	(China) Wang Shangyuan	(yellow card) 77'
CB	5	(China) Zhang Linpeng
CB	6	(China) Feng Xiaoting
LB	35	(China) Li Xuepeng	(yellow card) 81'
DM	8	(Brazil) Paulinho
DM	10	(China) Zheng Zhi (c)
AM	11	(Brazil) Ricardo Goulart		(substituted off) 90+2'
RW	2	(China) Liao Lisheng		(substituted off) 78'
LW	7	(Brazil) Alan Carvalho
CF	29	(China) Gao Lin		(substituted off) 72'
Substitutes:
GK	13	(China) Fang Jingqi
DF	21	(China) Zhang Chenglin		(substituted on) 90+2'
DF	25	(China) Zou Zheng
MF	4	(China) Xu Xin
MF	15	(China) Zhang Wenzhao
MF	20	(China) Yu Hanchao	(yellow card) 78'	(substituted on) 72'
MF	27	(China) Zheng Long		(substituted on) 78'
Coach:
(Brazil) Luiz Felipe Scolari

GK	30	(China) Zhang Sipeng
RB	24	(China) Ji Xiang		(substituted off) 68'
CB	5	(China) Zhou Yun
CB	2	(China) Li Ang
CB	26	(South Korea) Hong Jeong-ho
LB	28	(China) Yang Xiaotian	(yellow card) 39'
DM	7	(Brazil) Ramires
DM	12	(China) Zhang Xiaobin		(substituted off) 86'
CM	22	(China) Wu Xi (c)		(substituted off) 59'
SS	10	(Brazil) Alex Teixeira	(yellow card) 78'
ST	9	(Colombia) Roger Martínez
Substitutes:
GK	1	(China) Gu Chao
DF	39	(China) Yang Boyu
MF	8	(China) Liu Jianye
MF	11	(China) Xie Pengfei		(substituted on) 59'
MF	13	(China) Tao Yuan		(substituted on) 68'
MF	33	(China) Gu Wenxiang
FW	40	(China) Ge Wei		(substituted on) 86'
Coach:
(South Korea) Choi Yong-soo

Man of the Match:
(Brazil) Alan Carvalho (Guangzhou Evergrande Taobao)
Assistant referees:
Wang Dexin (Shenyang)
Ma Ji (Hubei)
Fourth official:
Ai Kun (Beijing Sport University)

Match rules

- 90 minutes.
- Penalty shoot-out if scores level.
- Seven named substitutes.
- Maximum of three substitutions.
- Maximum of five foreign players in the match list (including at least one AFC player).
- Maximum of four foreign players on the pitch at the same time (including at least one AFC player).

Chinese FA Super Cup
2017 Winners
Guangzhou Evergrande Taobao
Third title
