= 2019 Jiangsu Suning F.C. season =

Jiangsu Suning
2019 season
- Manager: Cosmin Olăroiu
- Stadium: Nanjing Olympic Sports Center
- Super League: 4th
- FA Cup: Round of 16
- Top goalscorer: League: Alex Teixeira (18); All: Alex Teixeira (18)
- Highest home attendance: League: 47,827
- Lowest home attendance: League: 18,336
- Average home league attendance: League: 27,508
Home colours	Away colours

The 2019 Jiangsu Suning F.C. season was Jiangsu Suning's 11th consecutive season in the Chinese Super League since it started in the 2004 season, and its 11th consecutive season in the top flight of Chinese football. This season Shandong Luneng Taishan participated in the Chinese Super League and Chinese FA Cup.

== Squad statistics ==
=== Appearances and goals ===
As of match played unknown

No.	Pos	Nat	Player	Total		Super League		FA Cup		AFC Champions League	
No.	Pos	Nat	Player	Apps	Goals	Apps	Goals	Apps	Goals	Apps	Goals
				0	0	0	0	0	0	0	0
Players transferred out during the season

=== Disciplinary record ===
As of match played unknown

No.	Pos	Nat	Player	Super League			FA Cup			FA Super Cup			AFC Champions League			Total		
No.	Pos	Nat	Player	Yellow card	Second yellow card	Red card	Yellow card	Second yellow card	Red card	Yellow card	Second yellow card	Red card	Yellow card	Second yellow card	Red card	Yellow card	Second yellow card	Red card
				0	0	0	0	0	0	0	0	0	0	0	0	0	0	0
Total				0	0	0	0	0	0	0	0	0	0	0	0	0	0	0

== Competitions ==
=== Chinese Super League ===
==== Table ====
Pos	Team	Pld	W	D	L	GF	GA	GD	Pts	Qualification or relegation
2	Beijing Sinobo Guoan	30	23	1	6	60	26	+34	70	Qualification for AFC Champions League group stage
3	Shanghai SIPG	30	20	6	4	62	26	+36	66	Qualification for AFC Champions League play-off round
4	Jiangsu Suning	30	15	8	7	60	41	+19	53	
5	Shandong Luneng Taishan	30	15	6	9	55	35	+20	51	
6	Wuhan Zall	30	12	8	10	41	41	0	44	

Source: CSL
Rules for classification:
- During season: 1) Points; 2) Goal difference; 3) Goals scored.
- After season: 1) Points; 2) Head-to-head points; 3) Head-to-head goal difference; 4) Head-to-head goals scored; 5) Scores of the weight ratio of the reserve league and youth leagues.

==== Results summary ====
Overall								Home						Away					
Pld	W	D	L	GF	GA	GD	Pts	W	D	L	GF	GA	GD	W	D	L	GF	GA	GD
30	15	8	7	60	41	+19	53	11	2	2	34	14	+20	4	6	5	26	27	−1

Last updated: 1 December 2019.
Source: League table

==== Results by round ====
Round	1	2	3	4	5	6	7	8	9	10	11	12	13	14	15	16	17	18	19	20	21	22	23	24	25	26	27	28	29	30
Ground	H	A	H	A	A	H	A	H	A	H	A	A	H	H	A	A	H	A	H	H	A	A	H	H	A	H	H	A	A	H
Result	W	L	W	L	W	W	L	D	D	W	L	D	W	L	D	L	L	D	W	W	D	D	W	W	W	W	D	W	W	W
Position	4	5	5	5	5	4	4	5	6	5	5	5	5	5	6	6	8	8	6	5	5	5	5	5	5	5	5	5	5	4

First match(es) will be played on 1 March 2019. Source: Competitive matches
A = Away; H = Home; W = Win; D = Draw; L = Loss

==== Matches ====
All times are local (UTC+8).

3 March 2019 1	Jiangsu Suning	3–2	Tianjin TEDA	Nanjing
19:35 UTC+8	Alex Teixeira 44' 76' (pen.); Éder 60' (pen.)	Summary	Zheng Kaimu (yellow card) 24' (yellow-red card) 50'; Tan Wangsong (yellow card) 54'; Paletta 69' (o.g.); Acheampong (yellow card) 83'; Johnathan 90'	Stadium: Nanjing Olympic Sports Center; Attendance: 36,319; Referee: Wang Jin

9 March 2019 2	Shanghai SIPG	3–2	Jiangsu Suning	Shanghai
19:35	Wang Song 2' (o.g.); Zhang Wei 3'; Lü Wenjun 47'; Fu Huan (yellow card) 90+4'	Summary	Ji Xiang (yellow card) 63'; Xie Pengfei 65' 69'	Stadium: Shanghai Stadium; Attendance: 23,501; Referee: Huang Yejun

31 March 2019 3	Jiangsu Suning	2–1	Wuhan Zall	Nanjing
20:35	Wang Song 25'; Wu Xi 70'	Summary	Li Hang (yellow card) 35'; Rafael Silva 76' (red card) 79'	Stadium: Nanjing Olympic Sports Center; Attendance: 31,889; Referee: Shi Zhenlu

5 April 2019 4	Beijing Sinobo Guoan	3–0	Jiangsu Suning	Beijing
20:35	Yu Yang (yellow card) 3' (yellow-red card); Zhang Yuning 22'; Bakambu 54'; Zhang Yu (yellow card) 85'; Wang Ziming 90+3'	Summary	Gao Tianyi (yellow card) 26'; Zhou Yun (yellow card) 64'; Yang Xiaotian (yellow card) 75'; Éder (yellow card) 76'; Wang Song (red card) 79'	Stadium: Workers' Stadium; Attendance: 46,109; Referee: (Serbia) Milorad Mažić

13 April 2019 5	Shenzhen	0–2	Jiangsu Suning	Shenzhen
20:35 UTC+8	Wang Xinbo (yellow card) 41' (yellow-red card); Zhou Xin (yellow card) 86'	Summary	Xie Pengfei 15'; Alex Teixeira 38'; Ji Xiang (yellow card) 57'; Luo Jing (yellow card) 78'	Stadium: Shenzhen Universiade Sports Centre; Referee: Zhang Lei (referee)

21 April 2019 6	Jiangsu Suning	5–1	Guangzhou R&F	Nanjing
18:30 UTC+8	Éder 3' 65'; Alex Teixeira 20' 26'; Xie Pengfei 88'	Summary	Tošić 12'; Ye Chugui (yellow card) 44'; Tang Miao (yellow card) 76'	Stadium: Nanjing Olympic Sports Center; Attendance: 28,693; Referee: Ai Kun

27 April 2019 7	Henan Jianye	2–1	Jiangsu Suning	Zhengzhou
20:35 UTC+8	Ivo 5' (yellow card) 89'; Ohandza (yellow card) 41' (goal) 56'; Han Xuan (yellow card) 90+5'	Report	Tian Yinong (yellow card) 19'; Yang Xiaotian (yellow card) 35'; Feng Boyuan (yellow card) 71'; Li Ang 75'	Stadium: Zhengzhou Hanghai Stadium; Attendance: 17,635; Referee: (China) Li Haixin

5 May 2019 8	Jiangsu Suning	1–1	Dalian Yifang	Nanjing
20:35 UTC+8	Alex Teixeira 61'	Report	Yang Shanping (yellow card) 29'; Qin Sheng (yellow card) 36'; Li Jianbin (yellow card) 50'; Carrasco 88' (pen.)	Stadium: Nanjing Olympic Sports Center; Attendance: 20,963; Referee: (China) Wang Zhe

12 May 2019 9	Guangzhou Evergrande Taobao	2–2	Jiangsu Suning	Guangzhou
20:35	Feng Xiaoting (yellow card) 10'; Gao Lin 24'; Wei Shihao 90+2' (pen.)	Report	Éder (yellow card) 29' (goal) 66'; Ye Chongqiu (yellow card) 38'; Xie Pengfei (yellow card) 44'; Alex Teixeira 73'; Abduhamit Abdugheni (yellow card) 90+1'	Stadium: Tianhe Stadium; Attendance: 46,139; Referee: (Czech Republic) Petr Ardeleánu

18 May 2019 10	Jiangsu Suning	3–1	Chongqing Dangdai Lifan	Nanjing
20:35 UTC+8	Wu Xi (yellow card) 35'; Ji Xiang (yellow card) 48'; Li Ang (yellow card) 49'; Luo Jing (yellow card) 57'; Wang Song 83'; Alex Teixeira 90+2'; Xie Pengfei 90+5'	Report	Mierzejewski 22' (yellow card) 39'; Yang Shuai (yellow card) 72' (yellow-red card) 74'; Feng Jin (yellow card) 73'	Stadium: Nanjing Olympic Sports Center; Attendance: 30,023; Referee: (China) Ai Kun

25 May 2019 11	Hebei China Fortune	3–2	Jiangsu Suning	Langfang
20:35 UTC+8	El Kaabi 25'; Cui Lin (yellow card) 26'; Dong Xuesheng 31' 44'; Wang Qiuming (yellow card) 76'; Mascherano (yellow card) 90+6'; Geng Xiaofeng (yellow card) 90+7'	Report	Li Ang 2'; Alex Teixeira 14'	Stadium: Langfang Stadium; Attendance: 15,219; Referee: (China) Shi Zhenlu

1 June 2019 12	Shandong Luneng Taishan	–	Jiangsu Suning	Jinan
19:35				Stadium: Jinan Olympic Sports Center Stadium

=== Chinese FA Cup ===
2 May 2019 Round of 32	Jiangsu Suning	4–0	Hebei Elite	Nanjing
20:35	Wang Song (yellow card) 25' (goal) 53'; Ji Xiang 35'; Luo Jing 48'; Feng Boyuan 74'	Report	Ma Sheng (yellow card) 3'; Ge Hailun (yellow card) 16'; Zhao Shuhao (yellow card) 52'	Stadium: Nanjing Olympic Sports Centre; Attendance: 15,760; Referee: (China) Memetjan Ahmat

29 May 2019 Round of 16	Jiangsu Suning	0–1	Shandong Luneng Taishan	Nanjing
20:35		Report	Liu Binbin (yellow card) 68'; Pellè 81'; Róger Guedes (yellow card) 90+4'	Stadium: Nanjing Olympic Sports Centre; Attendance: 20,618; Referee: (England) Mark Clattenburg
