= 2016 Chinese FA Super Cup =

Guangzhou Evergrande	Jiangsu Suning
2	0
- Date: 27 February 2016
- Venue: Chongqing Olympic Sports Center, Chongqing
- Man of the Match: (Brazil) Ricardo Goulart
- Referee: Tan Hai
- Attendance: 50,380
- Weather: Clear / 17°C / 53% humidity

Chang'an Ford 2016 Chinese FA Super Cup (Chinese: 长安福特2016中国足球协会超级杯) was the 14th Chinese FA Super Cup. The match was played at Chongqing Olympic Sports Center on 27 February 2016, contested by Super League winners Guangzhou Evergrande Taobao and FA Cup winners Jiangsu Suning. Guangzhou Evergrande beat Jiangsu Suning 2–0, thus winning their second Chinese FA Super Cup title after losing in recent three years.

== Match ==
=== Details ===
27 February 2016
19:35 UTC+8

Guangzhou Evergrande Taobao	2–0	Jiangsu Suningyi Purchase
Goulart 14', 39'	Report

Olympic Sports Center, Chongqing
Attendance: 50,380
Referee: Tan Hai (Beijing)

Guangzhou	Jiangsu

GK	19	(China) Zeng Cheng
RB	5	(China) Zhang Linpeng
CB	6	(China) Feng Xiaoting
CB	28	(South Korea) Kim Young-gwon
LB	35	(China) Li Xuepeng	(yellow card) 38'
DM	8	(Brazil) Paulinho
DM	10	(China) Zheng Zhi (c)
AM	11	(Brazil) Ricardo Goulart
RW	16	(China) Huang Bowen	(yellow card) 74'	(substituted off) 86'
LW	20	(China) Yu Hanchao
CF	9	(Colombia) Jackson Martínez		(substituted off) 90'
Substitutes:
GK	32	(China) Liu Dianzuo
DF	3	(China) Mei Fang
DF	17	(China) Liu Jian		(substituted on) 90'
MF	12	(China) Wang Shangyuan
MF	27	(China) Zheng Long		(substituted on) 86'
FW	7	(Brazil) Alan Carvalho
FW	29	(China) Gao Lin
Coach:
(Brazil) Luiz Felipe Scolari

GK	30	(China) Zhang Sipeng
RB	5	(China) Zhou Yun
CB	2	(China) Li Ang
CB	6	(Australia) Trent Sainsbury
LB	23	(China) Ren Hang	(yellow card) 27'
DM	12	(China) Zhang Xiaobin
DM	22	(China) Wu Xi (c)		(substituted off) 86'
AM	16	(Croatia) Sammir
RW	7	(Brazil) Ramires
LW	24	(China) Ji Xiang		(substituted off) 71'
CF	9	(Brazil) Jô		(substituted off) 46'
Substitutes:
GK	1	(China) Gu Chao
DF	32	(China) Liu Wei
MF	10	(Brazil) Alex Teixeira	(yellow card) 90'	(substituted on) 46'
MF	11	(China) Xie Pengfei		(substituted on) 86'
MF	13	(China) Tao Yuan
MF	20	(China) Zhang Xinlin		(substituted on) 71'
FW	50	(China) Ge Wei
Coach:
(Romania) Dan Petrescu

Man of the Match:
(Brazil) Ricardo Goulart (Guangzhou Evergrande Taobao)

Assistant referees:
Huo Weiming (Beijing)
Cao Yi (Henan)
Fourth official:
Fan Qi (Vanguard)

Chinese FA Super Cup
2016 Winners
Guangzhou Evergrande Taobao
Second title
