= Wang Song =

Wang Song may refer to:

- Mokjong of Goryeo (980–1009), personal name Wang Song
- Wang Song (footballer) (born 1983), Chinese footballer
