= Cao Haiqing =

Chinese footballer (born 1993)

Cao Haiqing 曹海清
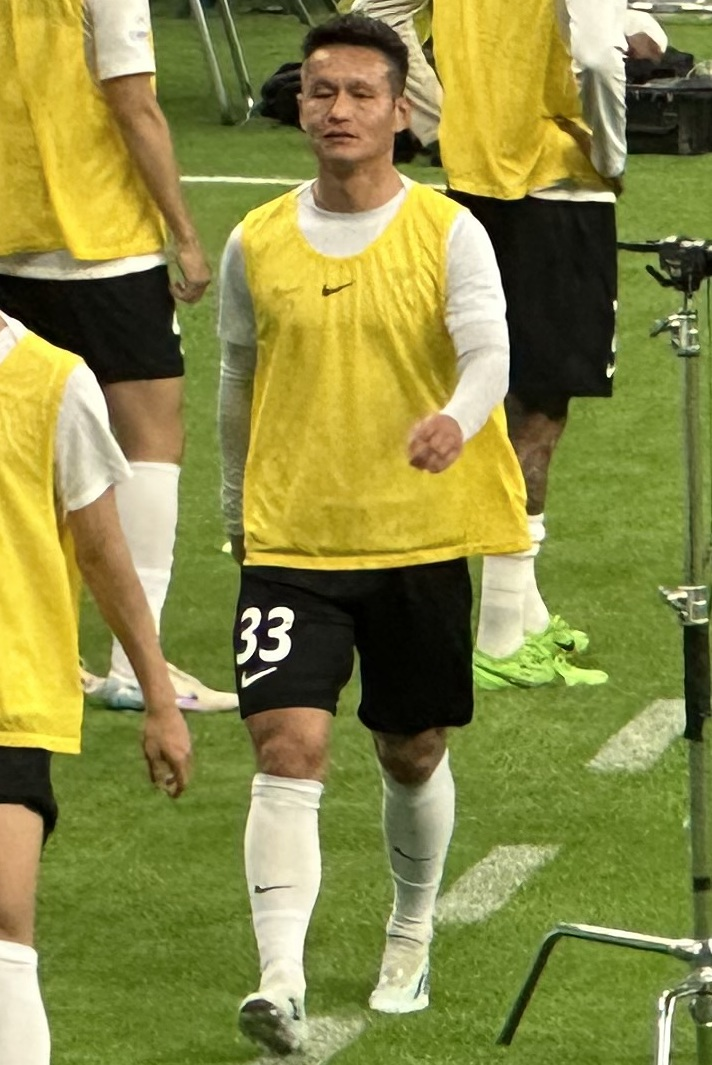
- Cao Haiqing in April 2025

Personal information
- Full name: Cao Haiqing
- Date of birth: 28 September 1993 (age 33)
- Place of birth: Wuhan, Hubei, China
- Height: 1.74 m (5 ft 8 1/2 in)
- Position: Full-back

Team information
- Current team: Dalian Yingbo
- Number: 33

Youth career
- Hangzhou Greentown

Senior career*
| Years | Team | Apps | (Gls) |
| 2011 | Wenzhou Provenza | 15 | (0) |
| 2012–2016 | Hangzhou Greentown | 40 | (0) |
| 2017–2020 | Jiangsu Suning | 13 | (0) |
| 2020 | → Kunshan FC (loan) | 13 | (0) |
| 2021 | Nanjing City | 22 | (1) |
| 2022 | Cangzhou Mighty Lions | 12 | (0) |
| 2023–2024 | Yunnan Yukun | 45 | (2) |
| 2025– | Dalian Yingbo | 23 | (0) |

International career
| | China U19 | 12 | (1) |
| 2014–2015 | China U23 | 5 | (0) |
- * Club domestic league appearances and goals as of 19 November 2026

Cao Haiqing (Chinese: 曹海清; born 28 September 1993 in Wuhan) is a Chinese footballer who plays for Dalian Yingbo.

== Club career ==
Cao Haiqing started his professional football career in 2011 when he was loaned to Wenzhou Provenza's squad for the 2011 China League Two campaign. He was promoted to Hangzhou Greentown first team squad in 2012 by Takeshi Okada. He made his Super League debut on 27 May 2012 against Henan Jianye, coming on as a substitute for Kim Dong-jin in the 70th minute. Cao became a regular starter in the 2016 season under Hong Myung-bo.

On 28 February 2017, Cao transferred to fellow Super League side Jiangsu Suning after Hangzhou was relegated to the second tier. On 2 April 2017, he made his debut for the club in a 3–1 away defeat against Liaoning FC, coming on for Yang Xiaotian in the 87th minute. He would struggle to become a regular within the team and go on loan to second-tier football club Kunshan for the 2020 China League One campaign. The following season he would transfer to another China League One club in Nanjing City on 15 April 2021.

On 29 April 2022, Cao joined top-tier club Cangzhou Mighty Lions for the 2022 Chinese Super League campaign. He would make his debut for them in a league game on 7 July 2022 against Shenzhen F.C. in a 2–1 defeat.

On 14 January 2025, Cao joined Chinese Super League club Dalian Yingbo.

== Career statistics ==
As of match played 31 December 2025.

Appearances and goals by club, season and competition
| Club | Season | League | | | National Cup | | Continental | | Other | | Total | |
| Club | Season | Division | Apps | Goals | Apps | Goals | Apps | Goals | Apps | Goals | Apps | Goals |
|---|---|---|---|---|---|---|---|---|---|---|---|---|
| Wenzhou Provenza | 2011 | China League Two | 15 | 0 | - | | - | | - | | 15 | 0 |
| Hangzhou Greentown | 2012 | Chinese Super League | 2 | 0 | 2 | 0 | - | | - | | 4 | 0 |
| Hangzhou Greentown | 2013 | Chinese Super League | 0 | 0 | 3 | 0 | - | | - | | 3 | 0 |
| Hangzhou Greentown | 2014 | Chinese Super League | 8 | 0 | 2 | 0 | - | | - | | 10 | 0 |
| Hangzhou Greentown | 2015 | Chinese Super League | 5 | 0 | 2 | 0 | - | | - | | 7 | 0 |
| Hangzhou Greentown | 2016 | Chinese Super League | 25 | 0 | 1 | 0 | - | | - | | 26 | 0 |
| Hangzhou Greentown | Total | | 40 | 0 | 10 | 0 | 0 | 0 | 0 | 0 | 50 | 0 |
| Jiangsu Suning | 2017 | Chinese Super League | 13 | 0 | 3 | 0 | 0 | 0 | 0 (Note: Appearances in Chinese FA Super Cup) | 0 | 16 | 0 |
| Jiangsu Suning | 2018 | Chinese Super League | 0 | 0 | 0 | 0 | - | | - | | 0 | 0 |
| Jiangsu Suning | Total | | 13 | 0 | 3 | 0 | 0 | 0 | 0 | 0 | 16 | 0 |
| Kunshan (loan) | 2020 | China League One | 13 | 0 | 2 | 0 | - | | - | | 15 | 0 |
| Nanjing City | 2021 | China League One | 22 | 1 | 1 | 0 | - | | - | | 23 | 1 |
| Cangzhou Mighty Lions | 2022 | Chinese Super League | 12 | 0 | 1 | 0 | - | | - | | 0 | 0 |
| Yunnan Yukun | 2023 | China League Two | 18 | 1 | 0 | 0 | - | | - | | 18 | 1 |
| Yunnan Yukun | 2024 | China League One | 27 | 1 | 2 | 0 | - | | - | | 29 | 1 |
| Yunnan Yukun | Total | | 45 | 2 | 2 | 0 | 0 | 0 | 0 | 0 | 47 | 2 |
| Dalian Yingbo | 2025 | Chinese Super League | 20 | 0 | 1 | 0 | - | | - | | 21 | 0 |
| Career total | | | 180 | 3 | 20 | 0 | 0 | 0 | 0 | 0 | 200 | 3 |

== Honours ==
Dalian Yingbo

- Chinese Super League: 2026
