= Wang Shangyuan =

Chinese footballer

Wang Shangyuan 王上源
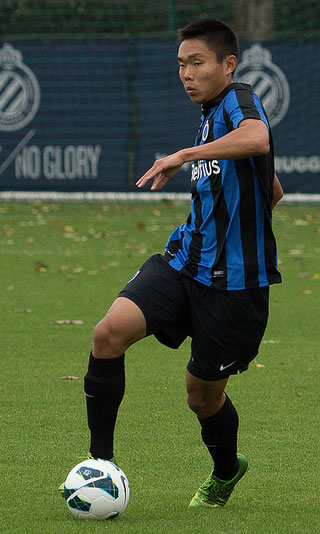
- Shangyuan with Club Brugge in 2015

Personal information
- Full name: Wang Shangyuan
- Date of birth: 2 June 1993 (age 33)
- Place of birth: Zhengzhou, Henan, China
- Height: 1.85 m (6 ft 1 in)
- Positions: Defender; defensive midfielder

Team information
- Current team: Henan FC
- Number: 6

Youth career
- 2006–2011: Beijing Sangao

Senior career*
Years	Team	Apps	(Gls)
2012	Beijing Sangao	21	(10)
2013–2015	Club Brugge	7	(1)
2015–2018	Guangzhou Evergrande	60	(1)
2018	→ Henan Jianye (loan)	17	(1)
2019–	Henan FC	191	(9)

International career^{‡}
2012–2014	China U19	14	(3)
2015–2016	China U23	6	(0)
2019–	China	38	(1)
Medal record
Representing China
Men's football
EAFF Championship
Bronze medal – third place	2019 South Korea	Team
- * Club domestic league appearances and goals as of 22 November 2026 ‡ National team caps and goals as of 26 January 2023

Wang Shangyuan (Chinese: 王上源; pinyin: Wáng Shàngyuán; Mandarin pronunciation: [wǎŋ ʂâŋ ɥɛ̌n]; born 2 June 1993) is a Chinese professional footballer who plays as a midfielder for Chinese Super League club Henan FC, whom he captains, and the China national team.

== Club career ==
Wang Shangyuan started his football career in 2012 when he was promoted to Beijing Sangao's first team during the 2012 season. He scored ten goals in 21 appearances, but Beijing were knocked out from the group stage by finishing eighth place in the northern group.

In April 2013, Wang was invited to a brief trial at Premier League side Manchester City. He continued his trial in Europe and moved to Belgian Pro League side Club Brugge in June 2013. On 13 July 2013, he signed a three-year contract with the Blauw-Zwart after impressing on trial. He made his debut for the club on 26 July 2013 in a 2–0 win against Sporting Charleroi, scoring his first goal for the club as well. This was the first goal scored league-wide in the 2013–14 season. He also made his European continental debut against Śląsk Wrocław in the 2013-14 UEFA Europa League in the third qualifying round. Wang started most of the club's matches at the beginning of the 2013-14 season; however, he was dropped to the reserves after Michel Preud'homme took over as manager.

On 27 February 2015, Wang joined Chinese Super League side Guangzhou Evergrande Taobao on a free transfer. He made his debut for the club on 22 March 2015 in a 1–1 draw against Changchun Yatai. Wang became a regular during the 2015 season when the club faced an injury crisis. He scored his first goal for the club on 5 July 2015 in a 7–0 win against Chongqing Lifan. On 22 February 2017, Wang scored twice in a 7–0 home win against Eastern in the 2017 AFC Champions League.

On 30 June 2018, Wang was loaned to fellow top tier side Henan Jianye (now known as Henan FC) for the rest of the 2018 season. He made his debut for the club on 18 July 2018 in a 2–1 away defeat against Beijing Guoan. On 7 November 2018, he scored his first goal for the club in a 4–0 home win against Guizhou Hengfeng, which ensured Henan's stay in the top flight for the following season. On 28 February 2019, Wang transferred to the club on a permanent basis.

== International career ==
On 10 December 2019, Wang made his international debut in a 1–2 defeat to Japan in the 2019 EAFF E-1 Football Championship.

Wang was named in China's squad for the 2023 AFC Asian Cup in Qatar and started the team's opening match against Tajikistan on 13 January 2024.

== Career statistics ==
=== Club statistics ===
As of 23 July 2023.

Appearances and goals by club, season and competition
Club	Season	League			National Cup		League Cup		Continental		Other		Total	
Club	Season	Division	Apps	Goals	Apps	Goals	Apps	Goals	Apps	Goals	Apps	Goals	Apps	Goals
Beijing Sangao	2012	China League Two	21	10	-		-		-		-		21	10
Club Brugge	2013-14	Belgian Pro League	7	1	0	0	0	0	2	0	-		9	1
Club Brugge	2014-15	Belgian Pro League	0	0	0	0	0	0	0	0	-		0	0
Club Brugge	Total		7	1	0	0	0	0	2	0	0	0	9	1
Guangzhou Evergrande	2015	Chinese Super League	19	1	1	0	-		0	0	0 (Note: Appearances in FIFA Club World Cup)	0	20	1
Guangzhou Evergrande	2016	Chinese Super League	23	0	5	0	-		3	0	0 (Note: Appearances in Chinese FA Super Cup)	0	31	0
Guangzhou Evergrande	2017	Chinese Super League	17	0	6	0	-		5	2	1	0	29	2
Guangzhou Evergrande	2018	Chinese Super League	1	0	2	0	-		3	0	0	0	6	0
Guangzhou Evergrande	Total		60	1	14	0	0	0	11	2	1	0	86	3
Henan Jianye (loan)	2018	Chinese Super League	17	1	0	0	-		-		-		17	1
Henan Songshan Longmen/ Henan FC	2019	Chinese Super League	25	1	0	0	-		-		-		25	1
Henan Songshan Longmen/ Henan FC	2020	Chinese Super League	13	2	0	0	-		-		-		13	2
Henan Songshan Longmen/ Henan FC	2021	Chinese Super League	16	1	0	0	-		-		-		16	1
Henan Songshan Longmen/ Henan FC	2022	Chinese Super League	32	3	0	0	-		-		-		32	3
Henan Songshan Longmen/ Henan FC	2023	Chinese Super League	21	0	0	0	-		-		-		21	0
Henan Songshan Longmen/ Henan FC	2024	Chinese Super League	27	1	3	0	-		-		-		30	1
Henan Songshan Longmen/ Henan FC	2025	Chinese Super League	28	0	5	1	-		-		-		33	1
Henan Songshan Longmen/ Henan FC	2026	Chinese Super League	8	1	0	0	-		-		-		13	1
Henan Songshan Longmen/ Henan FC	Total		187	10	8	1	0	0	0	0	0	0	195	11
Career total			270	22	22	1	0	0	13	2	1	0	311	25

=== International statistics ===
National team
Year	Apps	Goals
2019	2	0
2023	9	1
2024	14	0
2025	3	0
2026	10	0
Total	38	1

No.	Date	Venue	Opponent	Score	Result	Competition
1.	16 November 2023	Rajamangala Stadium, Bangkok, Thailand	Thailand	2–1	2–1	2026 FIFA World Cup qualification

== Honours ==
Guangzhou Evergrande

- Chinese Super League: 2015, 2016, 2017
- AFC Champions League: 2015
- Chinese FA Cup: 2016
- Chinese FA Super Cup: 2016, 2017, 2018
