= Zheng Long =

Chinese footballer

Zheng Long 郑龙
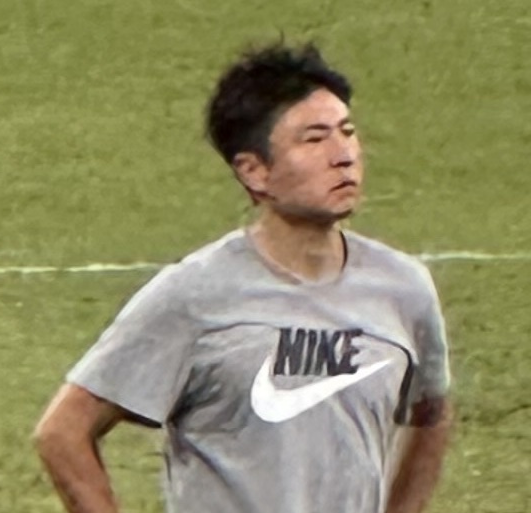
- Zheng Long in August 2024

Personal information
- Full name: Zheng Long
- Date of birth: 15 April 1988 (age 38)
- Place of birth: Qingdao, Shandong, China
- Height: 1.78 m (5 ft 10 in)
- Position: Left winger

Team information
- Current team: Qingdao Hainiu (assistant coach)

Youth career
- 2001–2005: Qingdao Jonoon

Senior career*
Years	Team	Apps	(Gls)
2006–2013	Qingdao Jonoon	174	(26)
2013	→ Guangzhou Evergrande (loan)	7	(2)
2014–2019	Guangzhou Evergrande	76	(14)
2019	→ Dalian Pro (loan)	16	(1)
2019–2021	Dalian Pro	27	(2)
2022–2025	Qingdao Hainiu	50	(3)

International career^{‡}
2009–2015	China	10	(4)

Managerial career
- 2026–: Qingdao Hainiu (assistant)
Medal record
Representing China
Men's football
EAFF Championship
Bronze medal – third place	2017 Japan	Team
- * Club domestic league appearances and goals as of 28 August 2025 ‡ National team caps and goals as of 20 October 2019

Zheng Long (Chinese: 郑龙; pinyin: Zhèng Lóng; Mandarin pronunciation: [ʈʂə̂ŋ lʊ̌ŋ]; born 15 April 1988) is a Chinese retired professional footballer who played as a left winger.

== Club career ==
Zheng Long started his football career after he graduated from top tier Qingdao Jonoon's youth academy in 2006. Throughout the 2007 season, he would start to gain significant playing time and go on to score his first goal of his career, which was a free kick in a league game on 7 April 2007 against Changchun Yatai in a 2-1 defeat. He would go on to start to establish himself as a regular for the team, however it was during the 2008 season that saw Zheng established himself as the clubs prominent left-sided player and an expert free kick specialist with five goals in 27 appearances.

On 19 July 2013, Zheng was loaned to fellow Chinese Super League side Guangzhou Evergrande until 31 December 2013. He made his debut for the club in a league game on 31 July 2013 in a 3–0 win against Beijing Guoan. Zheng would go on to win his first league title with Guangzhou and permanently transferred to them before the start of the 2014 season after Qingdao was relegated from the top tier in the 2013 Chinese Super League season. He would not play any matches during the 2014 season due to a serious fractured toe, however the following season on his return he would become a vital member of the team that would win the league title and 2015 AFC Champions League.

On 26 February 2019, Zheng was loaned to fellow top tier side Dalian Pro for the 2019 season. On 31 July 2019, Zheng permanently transferred to the club. After three seasons with Dalian, Zheng returned to Qingdao, with the renamed Qingdao Hainiu on 29 April 2022. He would go on to make his debut in a league game on 30 June 2022 against Shaanxi Chang'an Athletic in a 2-1 victory, where he also scored. He would go on to establish himself as regular within the team that gained promotion to the top tier at the end of the 2022 China League One campaign.

== Coaching Career ==
On 4 February 2026, Zheng retired from professional football and became the assistant coach of Qingdao Hainiu first team.

== International career ==
Zheng made his debut for the Chinese national team on 18 July 2009 in a 3–1 win against Palestine. He scored his first goal for the national team on 8 November 2009 in a 2–2 draw against Kuwait.

== Career statistics ==
=== Club statistics ===
As of match played 9 August 2025.

Appearances and goals by club, season and competition
Club	Season	League			National Cup		Continental		Other		Total	
Club	Season	Division	Apps	Goals	Apps	Goals	Apps	Goals	Apps	Goals	Apps	Goals
Qingdao Jonoon	2006	Chinese Super League	4	0	0	0	-		-		4	0
Qingdao Jonoon	2007	Chinese Super League	20	1	-		-		-		20	1
Qingdao Jonoon	2008	Chinese Super League	27	5	-		-		-		27	5
Qingdao Jonoon	2009	Chinese Super League	30	5	-		-		-		30	5
Qingdao Jonoon	2010	Chinese Super League	24	3	-		-		-		24	3
Qingdao Jonoon	2011	Chinese Super League	29	5	0	0	-		-		29	5
Qingdao Jonoon	2012	Chinese Super League	24	4	0	0	-		-		24	4
Qingdao Jonoon	2013	Chinese Super League	16	3	0	0	-		-		16	3
Qingdao Jonoon	Total		174	26	0	0	0	0	0	0	174	26
Guangzhou Evergrande (loan)	2013	Chinese Super League	7	2	1	0	1	0	0	0	9	2
Guangzhou Evergrande	2014	Chinese Super League	0	0	0	0	0	0	0	0	0	0
Guangzhou Evergrande	2015	Chinese Super League	27	7	0	0	10	0	3 (Note: Appearances in FIFA Club World Cup)	1	40	8
Guangzhou Evergrande	2016	Chinese Super League	19	4	6	0	4	0	1 (Note: Appearances in Chinese FA Super Cup)	0	30	4
Guangzhou Evergrande	2017	Chinese Super League	18	0	2	1	6	0	1	0	27	1
Guangzhou Evergrande	2018	Chinese Super League	12	3	1	0	5	1	0	0	18	4
Guangzhou Evergrande	Total		83	16	10	1	26	1	5	1	124	19
Dalian Professional	2019	Chinese Super League	19	2	3	1	-		-		22	3
Dalian Professional	2020	Chinese Super League	9	0	1	0	-		-		10	0
Dalian Professional	2021	Chinese Super League	15	1	3	0	-		0 (Note: Appearance(s) in CSL Relegation play-offs)	0	18	1
Dalian Professional	Total		43	3	7	1	0	0	0	0	50	4
Qingdao Hainiu	2022	China League One	22	3	0	0	-		-		22	3
Qingdao Hainiu	2023	Chinese Super League	13	0	4	2	-		-		17	2
Qingdao Hainiu	2024	Chinese Super League	10	0	2	0	-		-		12	0
Qingdao Hainiu	2025	Chinese Super League	4	0	1	0	-		-		5	0
Qingdao Hainiu	Total		49	3	7	2	0	0	0	0	56	5
Career total			349	48	24	4	26	1	5	1	404	54

=== International statistics ===
National team
Year	Apps	Goals
2009	4	1
2010	0	0
2011	0	0
2012	0	0
2013	3	3
2014	0	0
2015	3	0
Total	10	4

=== International goals ===
Scores and results list China's goal tally first.

No	Date	Venue	Opponent	Score	Result	Competition
1.	8 November 2009	Al Kuwait Sports Club Stadium, Kuwait City, Kuwait	Kuwait	1–1	2–2	Friendly
2.	6 September 2013	Olympic Stadium, Tianjin, China	Singapore	5–1	6–1	Friendly international
3.	6 September 2013	Olympic Stadium, Tianjin, China	Singapore	6–1	6–1	Friendly international
4.	10 September 2013	Olympic Stadium, Tianjin, China	Malaysia	1–0	2–0	Friendly

== Honours ==
=== Club ===
Guangzhou Evergrande

- Chinese Super League: 2013, 2014, 2015, 2016, 2017
- AFC Champions League: 2013, 2015
- Chinese FA Cup: 2016
- Chinese FA Super Cup: 2016, 2017, 2018
