= Yang Boyu =

Chinese footballer (born 1989)

Yang Boyu 杨博宇
Personal information
- Full name: Yang Boyu
- Date of birth: 24 June 1989 (age 37)
- Place of birth: Dalian, Liaoning, China
- Height: 1.87 m (6 ft 2 in)
- Position: Defender

Youth career
- Dalian Shide

Senior career*
Years	Team	Apps	(Gls)
2008–2012	Dalian Shide	77	(2)
2013–2014	Dalian Aerbin	17	(0)
2015–2016	Shanghai SIPG	10	(1)
2016	→ Changchun Yatai (loan)	9	(1)
2017–2020	Jiangsu Suning	57	(1)
2021	Wuhan FC	15	(1)
2022–2023	Shenzhen FC	21	(2)
2024	Qingdao West Coast	8	(0)
- * Club domestic league appearances and goals as of 31 December 2022

Yang Boyu (simplified Chinese: 杨博宇; traditional Chinese: 楊博宇; pinyin: Yáng Bóyǔ; born 24 June 1989 in Dalian) is a Chinese former footballer who played as defender.

== Club career ==
At the beginning of the 2008 Chinese Super League season Yang Boyu transferred to the senior team of Dalian Shide F.C. after graduating from their youth team. His senior debut with Dalian on 25 June 2008 against Liaoning FC resulted in a 2–1 win. As a promising defender, Yang Boyu was one of the shining stars of the bleak season for the club regardless of his narrow escape from relegation. At the beginning of the 2009 Chinese Super League, Yang Boyu became a vital member of the squad as he went on to establish himself within the team's defence and aided Dalian to an eighth-place finish.

On 26 February 2015, Yang transferred to fellow Chinese Super League side Shanghai SIPG. On 1 July 2016, Yang was loaned to Chinese Super League side Changchun Yatai until 31 December 2016.

On 13 February 2017, Yang moved to fellow Super League side Jiangsu Suning. On 1 March 2017, he made his debut for Jiangsu in the 2017 AFC Champions League against Adelaide United, coming on as a substitute for Li Ang in the 64th minute. He made his league debut for the club on 5 March 2017 in a 4–0 away defeat against Shanghai Shenhua. He established himself as a regular within the team and by the end of the 2020 Chinese Super League season, he won the club's first league title. On 28 February 2021, the parent company of the club, Suning Holdings Group, announced that operations were going to cease immediately due to financial difficulties.

On 26 February 2021, Yang joined a fellow top-tier club, Wuhan FC, on a free transfer. He made his debut in a league game on 19 July 2021 against Shanghai Port F.C. in a 0-0 draw. This was followed by his first goal for the club, which was in a league game on 12 December 2021, against Cangzhou Mighty Lions F.C. in a 4-2 victory. After one season with the club, he moved to another top-tier club in Shenzhen FC on 18 April 2022. He went on to make his debut in a league game on 9 October 2022 against Shanghai Shenhua in a 0-0 draw.

On 21 May 2026, Yang was given a 5-year ban for match-fixing by the Chinese Football Association.

== Career statistics ==
Statistics accurate as of match played 31 December 2022.

Appearances and goals by club, season and competition
Club	Season	League			National Cup		Continental		Other		Total	
Club	Season	Division	Apps	Goals	Apps	Goals	Apps	Goals	Apps	Goals	Apps	Goals
Dalian Shide	2008	Chinese Super League	8	0	-		-		-		8	0
Dalian Shide	2009	Chinese Super League	19	0	-		-		-		19	0
Dalian Shide	2010	Chinese Super League	19	0	-		-		-		19	0
Dalian Shide	2011	Chinese Super League	12	1	0	0	-		-		12	1
Dalian Shide	2012	Chinese Super League	19	1	0	0	-		-		19	1
Dalian Shide	Total		77	2	0	0	0	0	0	0	77	2
Dalian Aerbin	2013	Chinese Super League	12	0	2	0	-		-		14	0
Dalian Aerbin	2014	Chinese Super League	5	0	0	0	-		-		5	0
Dalian Aerbin	Total		17	0	2	0	0	0	0	0	19	0
Shanghai SIPG	2015	Chinese Super League	10	1	2	0	-		-		12	1
Shanghai SIPG	2016	Chinese Super League	0	0	0	0	1	0	-		1	0
Shanghai SIPG	Total		10	1	2	0	1	0	0	0	13	1
Changchun Yatai (Loan)	2016	Chinese Super League	9	1	0	0	-		-		9	1
Jiangsu Suning	2017	Chinese Super League	16	1	3	0	4	0	0 (Note: Appearances in Chinese FA Super Cup)	0	23	1
Jiangsu Suning	2018	Chinese Super League	10	0	2	0	-		-		12	0
Jiangsu Suning	2019	Chinese Super League	16	0	1	0	-		-		17	0
Jiangsu Suning	2020	Chinese Super League	16	0	4	0	-		-		20	0
Jiangsu Suning	Total		58	1	10	0	4	0	0	0	72	1
Wuhan FC	2021	Chinese Super League	15	1	2	0	-		-		17	1
Shenzhen FC	2022	Chinese Super League	8	1	0	0	-		-		8	1
Career total			194	7	16	0	5	0	0	0	215	7

== Honours ==
=== Club ===
Jiangsu Suning

- Chinese Super League: 2020
