= Huang Zichang =

Chinese footballer (born 1997)

Huang Zichang 黄紫昌
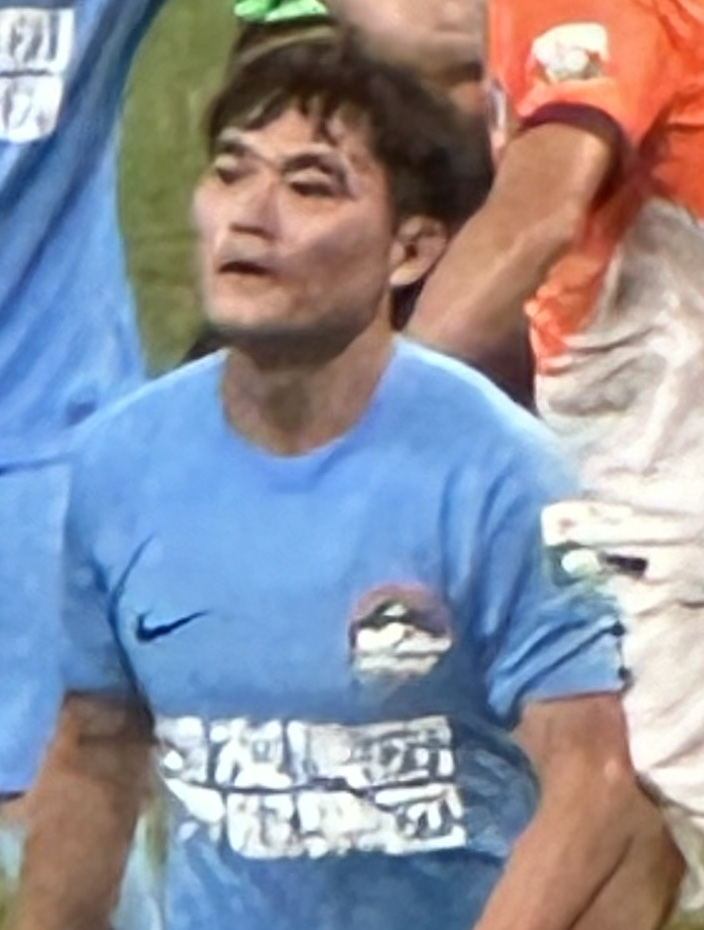
- Huang Zichang in August 2024

Personal information
- Full name: Huang Zichang
- Date of birth: 4 April 1997 (age 29)
- Place of birth: Putian, Fujian, China
- Height: 1.70 m (5 ft 7 in)
- Position: Midfielder

Team information
- Current team: Yunnan Yukun
- Number: 19

Youth career
- 2012–2015: Tianjiabing Middle School
- 2016: Jiangsu Suning

Senior career*
Years	Team	Apps	(Gls)
2017–2020	Jiangsu Suning	33	(5)
2021	Wuhan FC	16	(1)
2022–2025	Henan FC	106	(14)
2026–	Yunnan Yukun	25	(2)

International career^{‡}
2015–2017	China U-19	11	(7)
2018	China U-23	10	(3)
2018–	China	2	(0)
- * Club domestic league appearances and goals as of 19 November 2026 ‡ National team caps and goals as of 8 December 2019

Huang Zichang (Chinese: 黄紫昌; pinyin: Huáng Zǐchāng; born 4 April 1997) is a Chinese footballer who currently plays for Yunnan Yukun in the Chinese Super League.

== Club career ==
Huang Zichang started his football career when he signed his first professional contract with Chinese Super League side Jiangsu Suning in 2016. He was promoted to the first team squad by manager Choi Yong-soo in the 2017 season. Huang made his senior debut and scored his first goal in a league game on 4 March 2018 in a 3–1 away win against Guizhou Hengfeng. This would be followed with his second goal in his fifth appearance on 6 April 2018 in a 2–0 away win against Guangzhou R&F. On 22 April 2018 a third goal in seven league appearances would be scored by Huang in a 5–1 home win against Shanghai Greenland Shenhua. On 1 May 2018, Huang scored the deciding penalty in the fifth round of 2018 Chinese FA Cup as Jiangsu beat Tianjin Quanjian 8–7 on penalties. Although he suffered an ankle injury in August 2018, Huang scored five goals in 19 appearances in his debut season, winning the Chinese Football Association Young Player of the Year award. On 14 February 2019, he extended his contract with the club until the end of the 2024 season. This would be followed by the 2020 Chinese Super League title when he would win the clubs first league title with them.

Huang's time at Jiangsu would end when the clubs owners were in financial difficulties and dissolved the team. He would go on to join top-tier club Wuhan on 29 March 2021 in a free transfer. He would go on to make his debut in a league game on 23 April 2021 against Hebei in a 1–1 draw. This would be followed by his first goal for the club, which was in a Chinese FA Cup game on 14 October 2021 against Dandong Tengyue in a 7–0 victory.

On 15 April 2022, he joined fellow top-tier club Henan Songshan Longmen (later renamed as simply Henan FC) for the start of the 2022 Chinese Super League. This would be followed by his debut appearance for the club on 4 June 2022 in a league game against Dalian Professional in a 2–2 draw. After establishing himself as an integral member of the team he would score his first goal for the club on 7 July 2022, which was in a league game against Guangzhou City in a 2–1 victory.

On 5 January 2026, Huang joined Yunnan Yukun.

== International career ==
Huang made his debut for the Chinese national team on 26 May 2018 in a 1–0 win against Myanmar.

== Career statistics ==
=== Club ===
As of match played 22 November 2025

Appearances and goals by club, season and competition
Club	Season	League			National Cup		Continental		Other		Total	
Club	Season	Division	Apps	Goals	Apps	Goals	Apps	Goals	Apps	Goals	Apps	Goals
Jiangsu Suning	2017	Chinese Super League	0	0	0	0	-		0 (Note: Appearances in Chinese FA Super Cup)	0	0	0
Jiangsu Suning	2018	Chinese Super League	19	5	3	0	-		-		22	5
Jiangsu Suning	2019	Chinese Super League	6	0	0	0	-		-		6	0
Jiangsu Suning	2020	Chinese Super League	8	0	5	0	-		-		13	0
Jiangsu Suning	Total		33	5	8	0	0	0	0	0	41	5
Wuhan FC	2021	Chinese Super League	16	1	4	2	-		-		20	3
Henan FC	2022	Chinese Super League	31	7	1	2	-		-		32	9
Henan FC	2023	Chinese Super League	28	4	0	0	-		-		28	4
Henan FC	2024	Chinese Super League	29	2	3	2	-		-		32	4
Henan FC	2025	Chinese Super League	18	1	3	0	-		-		21	1
Henan FC	Total		106	14	7	4	0	0	0	0	113	18
Career total			155	2	19	6	0	0	0	0	174	26

=== International ===
National team
Year	Apps	Goals
2018	2	0
Total	2	0

== Honours ==
=== Club ===
Jiangsu Suning

- Chinese Super League: 2020

=== Individual ===
- Chinese Football Association Young Player of the Year: 2018
- Chinese Super League Team of the Year: 2018
