= Zhang Lingfeng =

Chinese footballer

Zhang Lingfeng 张凌峰
Personal information
- Date of birth: 28 February 1997 (age 29)
- Place of birth: Suzhou, Jiangsu, China
- Height: 1.76 m (5 ft 9 in)
- Position: Midfielder

Team information
- Current team: Ningbo FC
- Number: 28

Youth career
- Beijing Sangao
- 2011–2012: Pombal
- 2012–2013: Real Massamá
- 2014–2016: Sporting CP

Senior career*
Years	Team	Apps	(Gls)
2016–2018	Torreense	43	(2)
2018–2020	Jiangsu Suning	34	(1)
2021–2026	Suzhou Dongwu	129	(9)
2026–	Ningbo FC	0	(9)

International career^{‡}
2013–2015	China U20	11	(0)
2018–2020	China U23	3	(0)
- * Club domestic league appearances and goals as of 5 November 2023 ‡ National team caps and goals as of 5 June 2018

Zhang Lingfeng (Chinese: 张凌峰; pinyin: Zhāng Língfēng; born 28 February 1997) is a Chinese footballer who plays for Ningbo FC in the China League One.

== Club career ==
Zhang Lingfeng moved abroad following Chinese Football Association's 500.com Stars Project. He joined Pombal, Real Massamá and Sporting CP's youth academy between 2011 and 2016. Zhang signed for Campeonato de Portugal side Torreense in July 2016. On 21 August 2016, he made his senior debut in a 1–1 home draw against Vilafranquense. He scored his first goal on 19 March 2017 in a 3–0 home victory over Louletano. Zhang made 28 league appearances and scored two goals for Torreense in his debut season.

Zhang transferred to Chinese Super League side Jiangsu Suning on 28 February 2018. He made his debut for the club on 4 March 2018 in the first league match of the season against Guizhou Hengfeng with a 3–1 away win.

On 2 July 2026, Zhang transferred to China League One side Ningbo FC.

== Career statistics ==
As of 5 November 2023

Appearances and goals by club, season and competition
Club	Season	League			National Cup		Continental		Other		Total	
Club	Season	Division	Apps	Goals	Apps	Goals	Apps	Goals	Apps	Goals	Apps	Goals
União Torreense	2016–17	Campeonato de Portugal	28	2	5	0	-		-		33	2
União Torreense	2017–18	Campeonato de Portugal	15	0	3	1	-		-		18	1
União Torreense	Total		43	2	8	1	0	0	0	0	51	3
Jiangsu Suning	2018	Chinese Super League	21	0	3	0	-		-		24	0
Jiangsu Suning	2019	Chinese Super League	11	1	1	0	-		-		12	1
Jiangsu Suning	2020	Chinese Super League	2	0	5	2	-		-		7	2
Jiangsu Suning	Total		34	1	9	2	0	0	0	0	43	3
Suzhou Dongwu	2021	China League One	29	5	1	0	-		-		30	5
Suzhou Dongwu	2022	China League One	25	0	0	0	-		-		25	0
Suzhou Dongwu	2023	China League One	22	1	1	0	-		-		23	1
Suzhou Dongwu	Total		76	6	2	0	0	0	0	0	78	6
Career total			153	6	19	3	0	0	0	0	172	12

== Honours ==
Jiangsu Suning

- Chinese Super League: 2020
