= Zhang Xiaobin (footballer, born 1993) =

Chinese footballer

Zhang Xiaobin 张晓彬
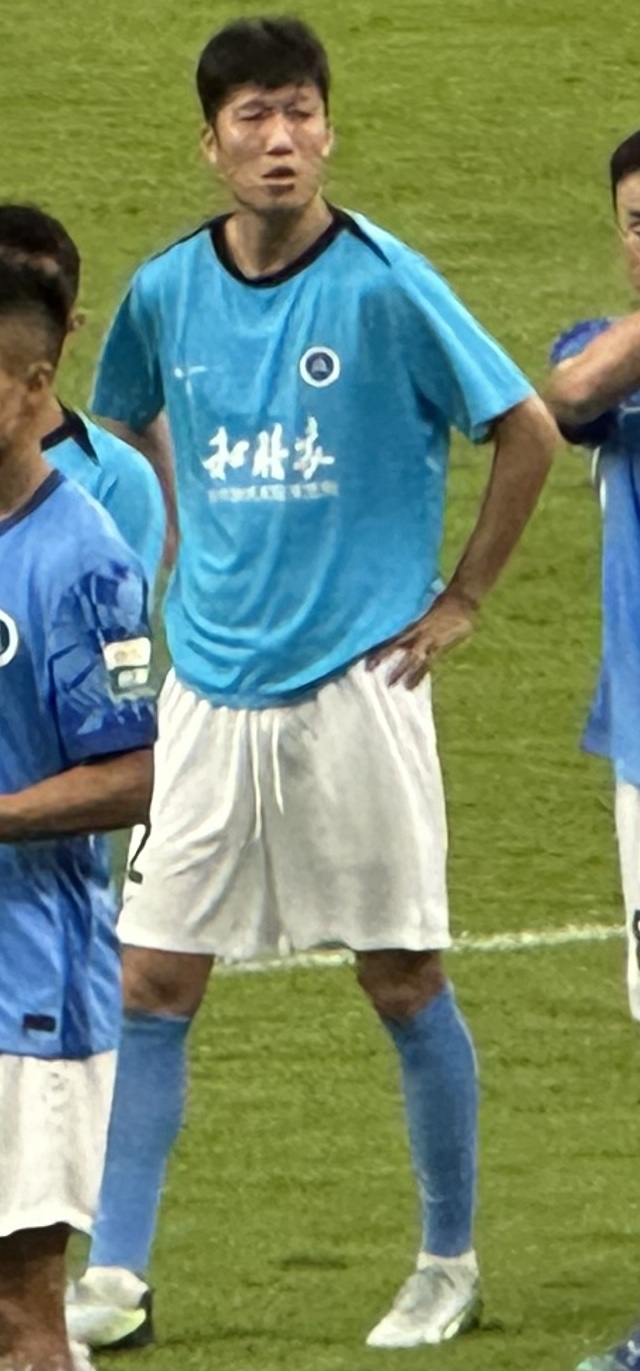
- Zhang Xiaobin in April 2025

Personal information
- Full name: Zhang Xiaobin
- Date of birth: 23 October 1993 (age 33)
- Place of birth: Nantong, Jiangsu, China
- Height: 1.88 m (6 ft 2 in)
- Position: Defensive midfielder

Team information
- Current team: Wuhan Three Towns
- Number: 18

Youth career
- 2007–2013: Jiangsu Sainty

Senior career*
| Years | Team | Apps | (Gls) |
| 2011–2012 | Jiangsu Youth | 20 | (2) |
| 2013–2020 | Jiangsu Suning | 92 | (3) |
| 2019 | → Tianjin Tianhai (loan) | 21 | (0) |
| 2021–2024 | Wuhan Three Towns | 119 | (4) |
| 2025–2026 | Shenzhen Peng City | 39 | (0) |
| 2026– | Wuhan Three Towns | 12 | (0) |

International career
| | China U19 | 9 | (0) |
| 2015–2016 | China U23 | 4 | (0) |
- * Club domestic league appearances and goals as of 22 November 2026

Zhang Xiaobin (Chinese: 张晓彬; born 23 October 1993) is a Chinese footballer who plays as a defensive midfielder for Wuhan Three Towns.

== Club career ==
Zhang Xiaobin started his football career with Jiangsu Sainty during the 2014 season after playing for Jiangsu Youth during the 2011 season and the 2012 season. On 23 July 2014, Zhang made his debut for Jiangsu Sainty in the 2014 Chinese FA Cup against Lijiang Jiayunhao, coming on as a substitute for Ji Xiang. On 26 October 2014, he made his Super League debut in the 2014 Chinese Super League against Shanghai East Asia. He scored his first and very decisive goal in CSL on 15 August 2015, when Jiangsu beat Shanghai Shenxin 1–0.

On 13 February 2019, Zhang was loaned to fellow first-tier club Tianjin Tianhai for the 2019 season. On 1 March 2019, he made his debut for the club in a 3–0 away defeat against Guangzhou Evergrande. On his return to Jiangsu he would be part of the squad that helped aid the club win the 2020 Chinese Super League title. On 28 February 2021, the parent company of the club Suning Holdings Group announced that operations were going to cease immediately due to financial difficulties.

On 6 April 2021, Zhang joined second tier club Wuhan Three Towns on a free transfer. In his debut season he would go on to establish himself as a vital member of the team and help aid the club to win the league title and gain promotion as the club entered the top tier for the first time in their history. The following campaign he would be part of the squad that won the 2022 Chinese Super League title.

On 7 January 2025, Zhang joined Chinese Super League club Shenzhen Peng City.

On 10 July 2026, Zhang returned to Wuhan Three Towns after 18 months in Shenzhen.

== International career ==
Zhang was called up to the senior China squad for the 2018 FIFA World Cup qualification – AFC third round.

== Career statistics ==
Statistics accurate as of match played 22 November 2025.

Appearances and goals by club, season and competition
| Club | Season | League | | | National Cup | | Continental | | Other | | Total | |
| Club | Season | Division | Apps | Goals | Apps | Goals | Apps | Goals | Apps | Goals | Apps | Goals |
|---|---|---|---|---|---|---|---|---|---|---|---|---|
| Jiangsu Youth | 2011 | China League Two | 1 | 0 | - | | - | | - | | 1 | 0 |
| Jiangsu Youth | 2012 | China League Two | 19 | 2 | - | | - | | - | | 19 | 2 |
| Jiangsu Youth | Total | | 20 | 2 | 0 | 0 | 0 | 0 | 0 | 0 | 20 | 2 |
| Jiangsu Sainty | 2014 | Chinese Super League | 1 | 0 | 1 | 0 | - | | - | | 2 | 0 |
| Jiangsu Sainty | 2015 | Chinese Super League | 20 | 1 | 6 | 0 | - | | - | | 26 | 1 |
| Jiangsu Sainty | 2016 | Chinese Super League | 28 | 1 | 8 | 0 | 4 | 0 | 1 (Note: Appearances in Chinese FA Super Cup) | 0 | 41 | 1 |
| Jiangsu Sainty | 2017 | Chinese Super League | 22 | 0 | 2 | 0 | 8 | 0 | 1 | 0 | 33 | 0 |
| Jiangsu Sainty | 2018 | Chinese Super League | 14 | 1 | 3 | 0 | - | | - | | 17 | 1 |
| Jiangsu Sainty | 2020 | Chinese Super League | 7 | 0 | 6 | 0 | - | | - | | 13 | 0 |
| Jiangsu Sainty | Total | | 92 | 3 | 26 | 0 | 12 | 0 | 2 | 0 | 132 | 3 |
| Tianjin Tianhai (loan) | 2019 | Chinese Super League | 21 | 0 | 2 | 0 | - | | - | | 23 | 0 |
| Wuhan Three Towns | 2021 | China League One | 33 | 1 | 0 | 0 | - | | - | | 33 | 1 |
| Wuhan Three Towns | 2022 | Chinese Super League | 30 | 3 | 2 | 0 | - | | - | | 32 | 3 |
| Wuhan Three Towns | 2023 | Chinese Super League | 28 | 0 | 2 | 0 | 5 | 1 | 1 | 0 | 36 | 1 |
| Wuhan Three Towns | 2024 | Chinese Super League | 28 | 0 | 1 | 0 | - | | - | | 29 | 0 |
| Wuhan Three Towns | Total | | 119 | 4 | 5 | 0 | 5 | 1 | 1 | 0 | 130 | 5 |
| Shenzhen Peng City | 2025 | Chinese Super League | 26 | 0 | 1 | 0 | - | | - | | 27 | 0 |
| Career total | | | 278 | 9 | 34 | 0 | 17 | 1 | 3 | 0 | 332 | 6 |

== Honours ==
Jiangsu Suning

- Chinese Super League: 2020
- Chinese FA Cup: 2015

Wuhan Three Towns

- Chinese Super League: 2022
- China League One: 2021
- Chinese FA Super Cup: 2023
