= Liu Wei (footballer) =

Chinese footballer (born 1993)

Liu Wei 刘伟
Personal information
- Full name: Liu Wei
- Date of birth: 7 January 1993 (age 33)
- Place of birth: Nantong, Jiangsu, China
- Height: 1.88 m (6 ft 2 in)
- Position: Centre-back

Team information
- Current team: Nantong Zhiyun
- Number: 15

Youth career
- Jiangsu Youth
- 2011–2015: Nanjing University
- 2015: Jiangsu Sainty

Senior career*
Years	Team	Apps	(Gls)
2016–2017	Jiangsu Suning	0	(0)
2018–	Nantong Zhiyun	201	(8)
- * Club domestic league appearances and goals as of 9 March 2026

Liu Wei (Chinese: 刘伟; born 7 January 1993) is a Chinese professional footballer who plays for as a centre-back for and captains Chinese League One club Nantong Zhiyun.

== Club career ==
Liu Wei received organised football training in Jiangsu Youth. He entered Nanjing University in 2009 and received his bachelor's degree of administration in the summer of 2015. He signed his first professional football contract after his successful trial at Jiangsu Sainty and was named in the reserve team of the club. He was promoted to Jiangsu Suning's first squad in 2016. On 23 February 2016, Liu made his debut for Jiangsu Suning in the first 2016 AFC Champions League group stage match against Vietnamese team Becamex Bình Dương. He committed a foul to concede a penalty which was scored by Nguyễn Anh Đức, as Jiangsu Suning tied with Becamex Bình Dương 1–1.

In March 2018, Liu transferred to his hometown club Nantong Zhiyun in the China League Two. He would go on to gain promotion to the second tier when the club finished runners-up at the end of the 2018 China League Two campaign. He would go on to establish himself as a vital member within the team and captained the team as the club gain promotion to the top tier at the end of the 2022 China League One season.

== Career statistics ==
Statistics accurate as of match played 31 December 2024.

Appearances and goals by club, season and competition
Club	Season	League			National Cup		Continental		Other		Total	
Club	Season	Division	Apps	Goals	Apps	Goals	Apps	Goals	Apps	Goals	Apps	Goals
Jiangsu Suning	2016	Chinese Super League	0	0	0	0	2	0	-		2	0
Jiangsu Suning	2017	Chinese Super League	0	0	0	0	0	0	-		0	0
Jiangsu Suning	Total		0	0	0	0	2	0	0	0	2	0
Nantong Zhiyun	2018	China League Two	20	0	1	0	-		-		21	0
Nantong Zhiyun	2019	China League One	27	1	0	0	-		-		27	1
Nantong Zhiyun	2020	China League One	15	0	-		-		-		15	0
Nantong Zhiyun	2021	China League One	33	2	1	0	-		-		34	2
Nantong Zhiyun	2022	China League One	32	4	0	0	-		-		34	4
Nantong Zhiyun	2023	Chinese Super League	26	0	0	0	-		-		26	0
Nantong Zhiyun	2024	Chinese Super League	23	1	1	0	-		-		24	1
Nantong Zhiyun	Total		176	8	3	0	0	0	0	0	179	8
Career total			176	8	3	0	2	0	0	0	181	8
