= Wenzhou Provenza F.C. =

Chinese football club

Wenzhou Provenza 温州葆隆
- Full name: Wenzhou Provenza Football Club 温州葆隆足球俱乐部
- Founded: April 2007; 18 years ago
- Dissolved: March 2011 (14 years ago)
- Ground: Wenzhou Sports Centre; Wenzhou, China
- Capacity: 20,000
- League: Chinese Yi League
Home colours	Away colours

Wenzhou Provenza Football Club (Simplified Chinese: 温州葆隆足球俱乐部) is a defunct Chinese football club from Wenzhou that Competed in the China League Two. The club was founded in April 2007.

== Name changes ==
- April 2007 – January 2010 "Wenzhou Tomorrow" 温州明日
- January 2010 – March 2011 "Wenzhou Provenza" 温州葆隆
