= Tian Yinong =

Chinese footballer (born 1991)

Tian Yinong 田依浓
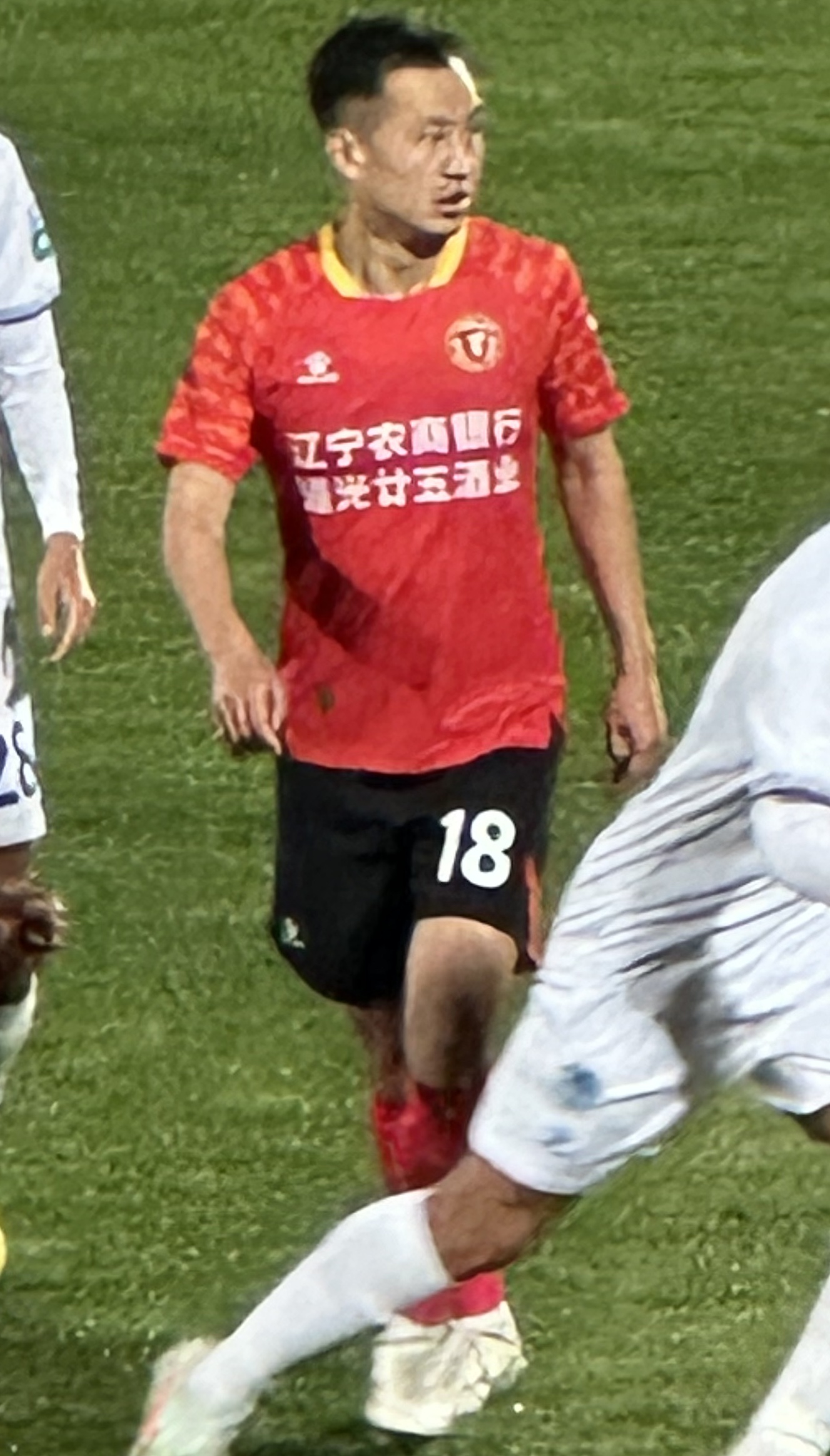
- Tian Yinong in April 2025

Personal information
- Full name: Tian Yinong
- Date of birth: 18 February 1991 (age 35)
- Place of birth: Chaoyang, Liaoning, China
- Height: 1.80 m (5 ft 11 in)
- Positions: Midfielder; defender

Team information
- Current team: Liaoning Tieren
- Number: 33

Youth career
- Liaoning FC
- 2006: Yanbian Funde

Senior career*
| Years | Team | Apps | (Gls) |
| 2009–2010 | Panjin Mengzun | | |
| 2011 | Fushun Xinye | 15 | (3) |
| 2012–2014 | Shenyang Zhongze | 31 | (1) |
| 2015 | Shenyang City | 13 | (15) |
| 2016–2017 | Yanbian Funde | 27 | (1) |
| 2018–2020 | Jiangsu Suning | 68 | (0) |
| 2021 | Wuhan FC | 21 | (0) |
| 2022–2023 | Tianjin Jinmen Tiger | 53 | (1) |
| 2024 | Shenzhen Peng City | 23 | (0) |
| 2025– | Liaoning Tieren | 41 | (0) |
- * Club domestic league appearances and goals as of 22 November 2026

Tian Yinong (Chinese: 田依浓; pinyin: Tián Yīnóng; Mandarin pronunciation: [tʰjɛ̌n.í nʊ̌ŋ]; born 18 February 1991) is a Chinese footballer who currently plays for Liaoning Tieren.

== Club career ==
Tian Yinong started his professional football career in 2009 when he was loaned to Liaoning Whowin's satellite team Panjin Mengzun in the China League Two. He joined fellow League Two club Fushun Xinye in 2011. Tian transferred to China League One side Shenyang Shenbei on 20 January 2012. He scored his first goal for Shenyang on 2 June 2012 in a 2–0 home victory against Shaanxi Laochenggen in the 2012 Chinese FA Cup. On 25 October 2014, he scored his first league goal in a 1–1 away draw against Chongqing Lifan. Tian played for amateur club Shenyang City in 2015 after Shenyang Zhongze dissolved and helped the club win promotion to China League Two.

Tian transferred to Chinese Super League newcomer Yanbian Funde on 5 January 2016. However, he couldn't register at the first team in the 2016 season due to transfer quota limits. Tian was promoted to the first team squad in the 2017 season. He made his debut for Yanbian on 5 March 2017 in a 0–0 away draw against Chongqing Lifan. Tian scored his first goal for the club on 2 June 2017 in a 2–1 away win against Guizhou Zhicheng.

On 25 February 2018, Tian transferred to Super League side Jiangsu Suning following Yanbian's relegation. He would make his debut for the club in a league game on 4 March 2018 against Guizhou Hengfeng in a 3–1 victory. He would go on to establish himself as integral member of the team and would help the club win their first league title at the end of the 2018 Chinese Super League season. On 28 February 2021, the parent company of the club Suning Holdings Group announced that operations were going to cease immediately due to financial difficulties.

On 29 March 2021, Tian joined top-tier club Wuhan FC on a free transfer. He would make his debut in a league game on 23 April 2021 against Hebei F.C. in a 1–1 draw. After only a season he would leave to join fellow top-tier club Tianjin Jinmen Tiger on 11 April 2022.

On 10 January 2025, Tian joined second-tier club Liaoning Tieren.

== Career statistics ==
As of 31 December 2025.

Appearances and goals by club, season and competition
| Club | Season | League | | | National Cup | | Continental | | Other | | Total | |
| Club | Season | Division | Apps | Goals | Apps | Goals | Apps | Goals | Apps | Goals | Apps | Goals |
|---|---|---|---|---|---|---|---|---|---|---|---|---|
| Panjin Mengzun | 2009 | China League Two | | | - | | - | | - | | | |
| Panjin Mengzun | 2010 | China League Two | | | - | | - | | - | | | |
| Panjin Mengzun | Total | | | | 0 | 0 | 0 | 0 | 0 | 0 | | |
| Fushun Xinye | 2011 | China League Two | 15 | 3 | - | | - | | - | | 15 | 3 |
| Shenyang Zhongze | 2012 | China League One | 9 | 0 | 2 | 1 | - | | - | | 11 | 1 |
| Shenyang Zhongze | 2013 | China League One | 6 | 0 | 1 | 0 | - | | - | | 7 | 0 |
| Shenyang Zhongze | 2014 | China League One | 16 | 1 | 2 | 1 | - | | - | | 18 | 2 |
| Shenyang Zhongze | Total | | 31 | 1 | 5 | 2 | 0 | 0 | 0 | 0 | 36 | 3 |
| Shenyang City | 2015 | Amateur League | 13 | 15 | - | | - | | - | | 13 | 15 |
| Yanbian Funde | 2016 | Chinese Super League | 0 | 0 | 0 | 0 | - | | - | | 0 | 0 |
| Yanbian Funde | 2017 | Chinese Super League | 27 | 1 | 1 | 0 | - | | - | | 28 | 1 |
| Yanbian Funde | Total | | 27 | 1 | 1 | 0 | 0 | 0 | 0 | 0 | 28 | 1 |
| Jiangsu Suning | 2018 | Chinese Super League | 26 | 0 | 3 | 0 | - | | - | | 29 | 0 |
| Jiangsu Suning | 2019 | Chinese Super League | 23 | 0 | 0 | 0 | - | | - | | 23 | 0 |
| Jiangsu Suning | 2020 | Chinese Super League | 19 | 0 | 5 | 0 | - | | - | | 24 | 0 |
| Jiangsu Suning | Total | | 68 | 0 | 8 | 0 | 0 | 0 | 0 | 0 | 76 | 0 |
| Wuhan FC | 2021 | Chinese Super League | 21 | 0 | 4 | 0 | - | | - | | 25 | 0 |
| Tianjin Jinmen Tiger | 2022 | Chinese Super League | 27 | 1 | 0 | 0 | - | | - | | 27 | 1 |
| Tianjin Jinmen Tiger | 2023 | Chinese Super League | 26 | 0 | 2 | 0 | - | | - | | 28 | 0 |
| Tianjin Jinmen Tiger | Total | | 53 | 1 | 2 | 0 | 0 | 0 | 0 | 0 | 55 | 1 |
| Shenzhen Peng City | 2024 | Chinese Super League | 23 | 0 | 0 | 0 | - | | - | | 23 | 0 |
| Liaoning Tieren | 2025 | China League One | 29 | 0 | 2 | 0 | - | | - | | 31 | 0 |
| Career total | | | 280 | 21 | 22 | 2 | 0 | 0 | 0 | 0 | 302 | 23 |

== Honours ==
=== Club ===
Jiangsu Suning

- Chinese Super League: 2020.

Liaoning Tieren

- China League One: 2025
