= Xie Pengfei =

Chinese footballer (born 1993)

Xie Pengfei 谢鹏飞
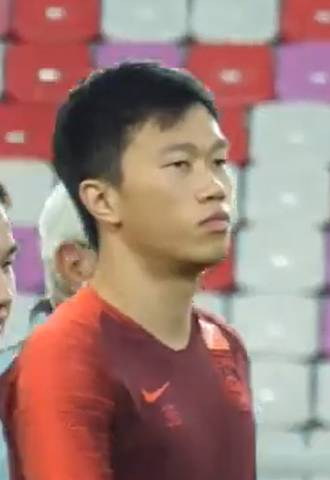
- Xie Pengfei in September 2019

Personal information
- Full name: Xie Pengfei
- Date of birth: 29 June 1993 (age 33)
- Place of birth: Guiyang, Guizhou, China
- Height: 1.81 m (5 ft 11 1/2 in)
- Position: Left winger

Team information
- Current team: Shanghai Shenhua
- Number: 30

Youth career
- 2001–2006: Shenzhen Yantian Sports School
- 2006–2011: Hangzhou Greentown
- 2010–2011: → FC Metz (loan)

Senior career*
Years	Team	Apps	(Gls)
2011	→ Wenzhou Provenza (loan)	10	(1)
2012–2016	Hangzhou Greentown	46	(5)
2016–2020	Jiangsu Suning	103	(12)
2021	Cangzhou Mighty Lions	18	(4)
2022–2023	Wuhan Three Towns	59	(12)
2024–	Shanghai Shenhua	58	(8)

International career^{‡}
2012–2014	China U-19	7	(4)
2014–2016	China U-23	20	(7)
2019–	China	19	(0)
- * Club domestic league appearances and goals as of 19 November 2026 ‡ National team caps and goals as of 26 March 2024

Xie Pengfei (simplified Chinese: 谢鹏飞; traditional Chinese: 謝鵬飛; pinyin: Xiè Péngfēi; born 29 June 1993) is a Chinese professional footballer who currently plays for Chinese Super League club Shanghai Shenhua and the China national team.

== Club career ==
Xie Pengfei started his football career when he joined Hangzhou Greentown's youth academy from Shenzhen Yantian Sports School in 2006. He was loaned out to Ligue 2 side FC Metz along with Liu Binbin for youth training in 2010. Xie returned to Hangzhou during the 2011 season and was loaned to third tier side Wenzhou Provenza for the rest of the season. He scored his first goal for the club on 20 September 2011 in a 2-1 win against Chongqing F.C.

Xie was promoted to the club's first team by then manager Takeshi Okada in the 2012 season. He made his debut for the club on 22 April 2012 in a 2-0 loss against Tianjin Teda. He scored his first goal for the club on 26 June 2012 in a 3-0 win against Shanghai East Asia in the 2012 Chinese FA Cup.

On 12 February 2016, Xie transferred to fellow Chinese Super League side Jiangsu Suning. He made his debut for the club on 23 February 2016 in a 1-1 draw against Becamex Binh Duong in the 2016 AFC Champions League. He scored his first goal for the club on 17 September 2016 in a 2-0 win against Tianjin Teda. He would go on to establish himself as a regular within the team and in the 2020 Chinese Super League season he would win the clubs first league title with them. On 28 February 2021, the parent company of the club Suning Holdings Group announced that operations were going to cease immediately due to financial difficulties.

On 2 April 2021, Xie transferred to another top tier club in Cangzhou Mighty Lions. He would go on to make his debut in a league game against Qingdao on 21 April 2021, in a 2-1 defeat. After only one season he left to join newly promoted top tier side Wuhan Three Towns on 29 April 2022. He would go on to make his debut on 3 June 2022, in a league game against Hebei, which ended in a 4-0 victory. After the game he would go on to establish himself as a regular within the team that won the 2022 Chinese Super League title.

== International career ==
Xie received his first call-up to the Chinese under-20 national team when he was called up by then manager Su Maozhen in May 2011. He played for the team during the 2011 Toulon Tournament and 2013 Toulon Tournament. He also made two appearances during 2012 AFC U-19 Championship qualification as the under-20 side qualified for the 2012 AFC U-19 Championship in November 2011. He made his debut for the Chinese national team in a 1-0 loss against Thailand in the 2019 China Cup.

Xie was named in China's squad for the 2023 AFC Asian Cup in Qatar and came on as a substitute in their opening match against Tajikistan on 13 January 2024.

== Career statistics ==
=== Club statistics ===
As of 10 April 2024

Appearances and goals by club, season and competition
Club	Season	League			National Cup		Continental		Other		Total	
Club	Season	Division	Apps	Goals	Apps	Goals	Apps	Goals	Apps	Goals	Apps	Goals
Wenzhou Provenza (loan)	2011	China League Two	10	1	-		-		-		10	1
Hangzhou Greentown	2012	Chinese Super League	1	0	2	1	-		-		3	1
Hangzhou Greentown	2013	Chinese Super League	11	0	2	0	-		-		13	0
Hangzhou Greentown	2014	Chinese Super League	14	1	1	0	-		-		15	1
Hangzhou Greentown	2015	Chinese Super League	20	4	2	0	-		-		22	4
Hangzhou Greentown	Total		46	5	7	1	0	0	0	0	53	6
Jiangsu Suning	2016	Chinese Super League	14	2	7	0	1	0	1 (Note: Appearances in Chinese FA Super Cup)	0	23	2
Jiangsu Suning	2017	Chinese Super League	20	1	3	0	6	0	1	0	30	1
Jiangsu Suning	2018	Chinese Super League	27	2	3	1	-		-		30	3
Jiangsu Suning	2019	Chinese Super League	26	8	1	0	-		-		27	8
Jiangsu Suning	2020	Chinese Super League	16	1	6	2	-		-		22	3
Jiangsu Suning	Total		103	14	20	3	7	0	2	0	132	17
Cangzhou Mighty Lions	2021	Chinese Super League	18	4	1	0	-		-		19	4
Wuhan Three Towns	2022	Chinese Super League	30	8	0	0	-		-		30	8
Wuhan Three Towns	2023	Chinese Super League	29	4	2	0	4	0	1	1	36	5
Wuhan Three Towns	Total		59	12	2	0	4	0	1	1	66	13
Shanghai Shenhua	2024	Chinese Super League	5	1	0	0	-		1	0	6	1
Career total			241	37	30	4	11	0	4	1	286	42

=== International statistics ===
National team
Year	Apps	Goals
2019	5	0
2020	0	0
2021	0	0
2022	0	0
2023	8	0
2024	5	0
Total	18	0

== Honours ==
Jiangsu Suning

- Chinese Super League: 2020

Wuhan Three Towns

- Chinese Super League: 2022
- Chinese FA Super Cup: 2023

Shanghai Shenhua

- Chinese FA Super Cup: 2024, 2025

Individual

- Chinese Super League Team of the Year: 2023
