= Wang Song (footballer) =

Chinese footballer

Wang Song 汪嵩
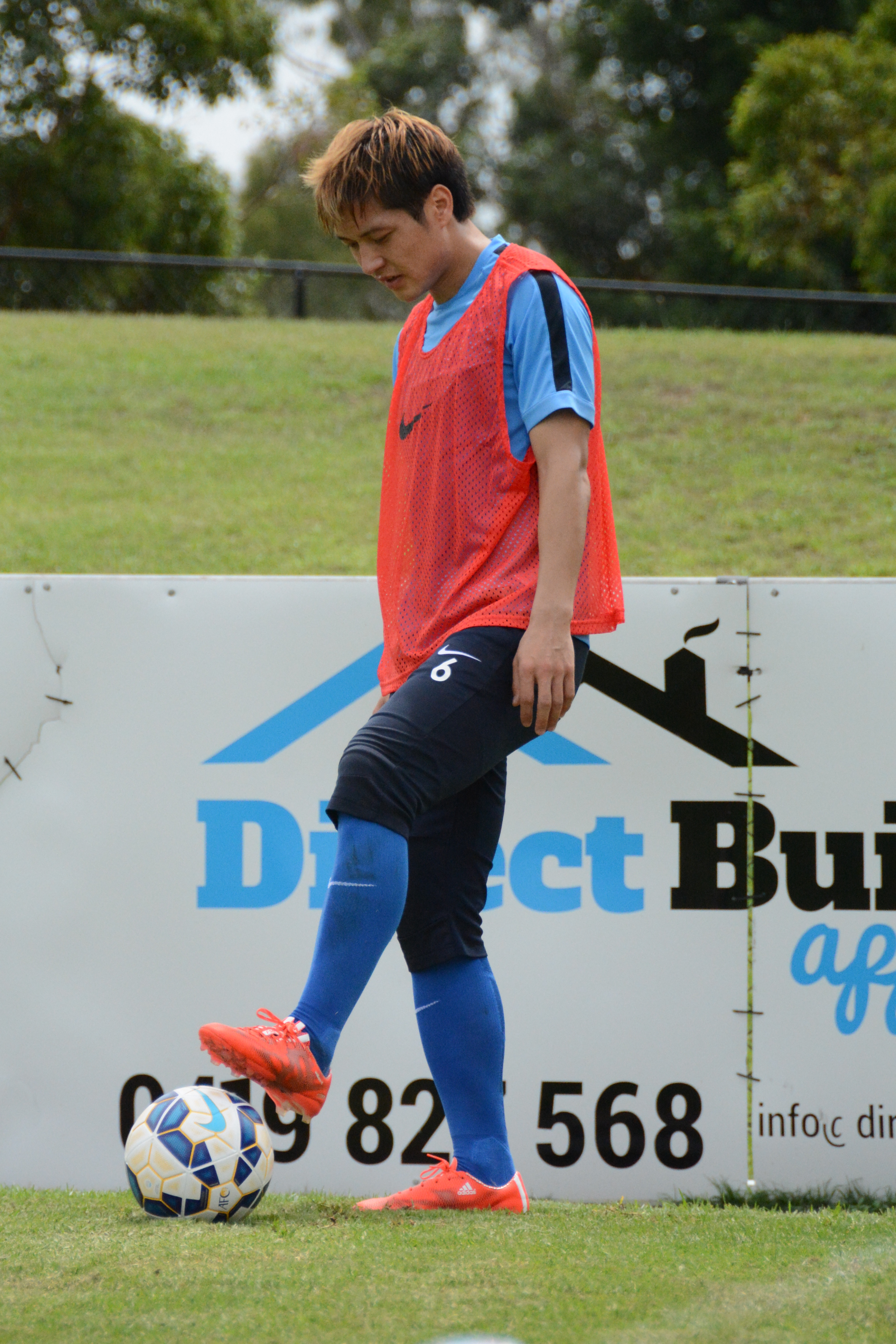

Personal information
- Full name: Wang Song
- Date of birth: 12 October 1983 (age 43)
- Place of birth: Guiyang, Guizhou, China
- Height: 1.77 m (5 ft 10 in)
- Position: Midfielder

Senior career*
Years	Team	Apps	(Gls)
2001–2005	Sichuan First City	95	(13)
2006–2009	Chengdu Blades	105	(30)
2010–2014	Hangzhou Greentown	142	(26)
2015–2016	Guangzhou R&F	60	(3)
2017–2019	Jiangsu Suning	66	(8)
2020–2022	Sichuan Jiuniu	14	(1)
2021	→ Hebei Kungfu (loan)	14	(3)
2022–2023	Shijiazhuang Gongfu	32	(2)
2023	Nantong Zhiyun	28	(2)
2024	Shijiazhuang Gongfu	22	(1)

International career^{‡}
2008–2011	China	9	(0)

Managerial career
- 2024: Shijiazhuang Gongfu (assistant coach)
Medal record
Representing China
Men's football
EAFF Championship
Bronze medal – third place	2008 China	Team
- * Club domestic league appearances and goals as of 2 September 2024 ‡ National team caps and goals as of 31 October 2015

Wang Song (Chinese: 汪嵩; pinyin: Wāng Sōng; born 12 October 1983) is a Chinese professional footballer who last played for Chinese football club Shijiazhuang Gongfu. His career spans over two decades and he held the record for most appearances in Chinese top division history with 445 games until Wang Dalei surpassed him in July 2025.

On 10 September 2024, Chinese Football Association announced that Wang was banned from football-related activities for five years, from 10 September 2024 to 9 September 2029, for involving in match-fixing.

== Club career ==
=== Sichuan Quanxing ===
Wang Song started his football career playing for Sichuan Quanxing in the 2001 season and would gradually establish himself as an attacking left-footed midfielder within the team until the end of the 2005 season when the club disbanded at the end of the season.

=== Chengdu Blades ===
Wang was free to join second tier club Chengdu Blades in early 2006, where he was named as their captain. This responsibility seemed to get the best out of him and he became the top scorer in the 2007 season with seventeen goals in 24 games, helping the club secure promotion to the top tier. By the end of the 2008 league season, he had led Chengdu to thirteenth place within the league; however, they were relegated in the following season.

=== Hangzhou Greentown ===
In February 2010, Wang join Chinese Super League club Hangzhou Greentown for 3 million yuan. He helped Zhejiang to the fourth place in the Chinese Super League, the club's highest position at that time, and qualified for the Asian Champions League for the first time. Hangzhou announced that the club decided not to extend Wang's contract at the end of the 2014 season.

=== Guangzhou R&F ===
On 15 December 2014, Wang transferred to fellow Chinese Super League side Guangzhou R&F on a free transfer. On 10 February 2015, he made his debut for the club in the preliminary round of the 2015 AFC Champions League in a 3-0 win against Warriors FC. After playing a part in every CSL game in 2015 and 2016, he signed a contract extension with R&F on 25 January 2017.

=== Jiangsu Suning ===
On 28 February 2017, Wang transferred to fellow Super League side Jiangsu Suning. He made his debut on 5 March 2017 in a 4–0 away defeat against Shanghai Shenhua, coming on as a substitute for Gao Tianyi in the half time. On 2 April 2017, he scored his first goal for Jiangsu in a 3–1 away defeat against Liaoning FC, which made him the first to score in 16th consecutive season of Chinese football league.

On 20 October 2019, Wang came on as a substitute in the 68th minute in a 4-1 home win over Hebei China Fortune, making him the record appearance maker in Chinese top division(including the former Jia-A League) with 416 games, surpassing previous record set by Xu Yunlong.

=== Sichuan Jiuniu ===
On 9 March 2020, Wang joined Sichuan Jiuniu on a free transfer, returning to playing in Sichuan after 11 years. The club was in China League Two (Third division in Chinese football league system) upon his arrival, however, due to the dissolution and disqualification of numerous clubs from the top two divisions, Jiuniu eventually participated China League One for the 2020 season.

=== Hebei Kungfu ===
Having fallen out with Jiuniu's head coach Li Yi, Wang didn't make a single appearance for the club in the 2021 season. On 30 July 2021, Wang joined China League Two club Hebei Kungfu on loan for the remainder of the season. He helped Hebei secure promotion to China League One in his first season, and joined the club permanently on a free transfer in March 2022, by this time Hebei has renamed as Shijiazhuang Gongfu.

=== Nantong Zhiyun ===
On 22 January 2023, Wang returned to the Chinese Super League after 3 years and joined newly promoted club Nantong Zhiyun. On 4 June 2023, he scored his first goal for Nantong, a late winner in a 1-0 home win against Qingdao Hainiu, extending his scoring streak to an astonishing 22 consecutive seasons. He helped the team stay up in their first season in the Super League, making 28 league appearances and extended his record to 445 games in Chinese top division.

=== Return to Shijiazhuang Gongfu ===
On 18 January 2024, Wang returned to China League One club Shijiazhuang Gongfu.

== International career ==
Wang was called up by then manager Vladimir Petrović to his squad where he gave him his international debut in a 0–0 draw against Lebanon on 20 January 2008. Playing in several further friendlies, Wang was often playing as a left midfielder and was unable to make much of an impression within the team before he was dropped from the squad. After several years out of the international scene, then manager Gao Hongbo called him up to the national team and included him in the squad that took part in the 2011 AFC Asian Cup.

== Career statistics ==
As of 2 September 2024.

Appearances and goals by club, season and competition
Club	Season	League			National Cup		League Cup		Continental		Total	
Club	Season	Division	Apps	Goals	Apps	Goals	Apps	Goals	Apps	Goals	Apps	Goals
Sichuan First City	2001	Chinese Jia-A League	3	0	0	0	-		-		3	0
Sichuan First City	2002	Chinese Jia-A League	24	3	1	0	-		-		25	3
Sichuan First City	2003	Chinese Jia-A League	25	5	3	0	-		-		28	5
Sichuan First City	2004	CSL	22	4	8	4	4	1	-		34	9
Sichuan First City	2005	CSL	21	1	1	1	2	0	-		24	2
Sichuan First City	Total		95	13	13	5	6	1	0	0	114	19
Chengdu Blades	2006	China League One	24	2	0	0	-		-		24	2
Chengdu Blades	2007	China League One	23	17	-		-		-		23	17
Chengdu Blades	2008	CSL	29	6	-		-		-		29	6
Chengdu Blades	2009	CSL	29	5	-		-		-		29	5
Chengdu Blades	Total		105	30	0	0	0	0	0	0	105	30
Hangzhou Greentown	2010	CSL	29	6	-		-		-		29	6
Hangzhou Greentown	2011	CSL	26	1	1	0	-		6	0	33	1
Hangzhou Greentown	2012	CSL	30	8	2	1	-		-		32	9
Hangzhou Greentown	2013	CSL	28	8	1	0	-		-		29	8
Hangzhou Greentown	2014	CSL	29	3	0	0	-		-		29	3
Hangzhou Greentown	Total		142	26	4	1	0	0	6	0	152	27
Guangzhou R&F	2015	CSL	30	1	2	0	-		7	1	39	2
Guangzhou R&F	2016	CSL	30	2	5	0	-		-		35	2
Guangzhou R&F	Total		60	3	7	0	0	0	7	1	74	4
Jiangsu Suning	2017	CSL	19	3	1	0	-		0	0	20	3
Jiangsu Suning	2018	CSL	19	1	1	0	-		-		20	1
Jiangsu Suning	2019	CSL	24	3	2	1	-		-		26	4
Jiangsu Suning	Total		62	7	4	1	0	0	0	0	66	8
Sichuan Jiuniu	2020	China League One	14	1	-		-		-		14	1
Hebei Kungfu (loan)	2021	China League Two	14	3	0	0	-		-		14	3
Shijiazhuang Gongfu	2022	China League One	32	2	0	0	-		-		32	2
Nantong Zhiyun	2023	CSL	28	2	2	1	-		-		30	3
Shijiazhuang Gongfu	2024	China League One	21	2	2	1	-		-		23	3
Career total			573	89	32	9	6	1	13	1	624	100
