= Gu Chao =

Chinese footballer

Gu Chao 顾超
Personal information
- Full name: Gu Chao
- Date of birth: 20 August 1989 (age 37)
- Place of birth: Shanghai, China
- Height: 1.93 m (6 ft 4 in)
- Position: Goalkeeper

Youth career
- 2000–2006: Genbao Football Academy

Senior career*
Years	Team	Apps	(Gls)
2006–2010	Shanghai East Asia	50	(0)
2011–2015	Hangzhou Greentown	78	(0)
2016–2020	Jiangsu Suning	115	(0)
2021–2022	Zhejiang FC	53	(0)

International career^{‡}
2016	China	2	(0)
- * Club domestic league appearances and goals as of 31 January 2023 ‡ National team caps and goals as of 6 September 2016

Gu Chao (Chinese: 顾超; pinyin: Gù Chāo; born 20 August 1989) is a Chinese former professional footballer.

He was later banned from football-related activities in China for life over allegations of match-fixing and other forms of corruption.

== Club career ==
Gu Chao joined the Genbao Football Academy in 2000 and was promoted to Shanghai East Asia's first team squad during the 2006 season. He played regularly as the starting goalkeeper and made an impression within the team as Shanghai won promotion to the second tier in the 2007 season.

On 15 March 2011, Gu transferred to Chinese Super League side Hangzhou Greentown for a fee of ¥2 million. On 6 July 2011, he made his debut for Hangzhou in a 1–1 away draw against Dalian Shide. He mainly played as the backup goalkeeper for Jiang Bo in the 2011 season and 2012 season. However, it was not until the 2014 season when Gu cemented his role as the team's starting goalkeeper.

On 31 December 2015, Gu moved to Chinese Super League side Jiangsu Suning on a five-year contract with a transfer fee of ¥50 million, which being above Wang Dalei's transfer record fee of ¥30 million, made him the most expensive goalkeeper in China. He played as a back-up for Zhang Sipeng at the beginning of the season. Gu made his debut for Jiangsu on 9 April 2016 in a 1–0 win against Henan Jianye. He became the first choice goalkeeper of the club after the match. At the end of the 2020 Chinese Super League he would repay the club by winning the league title with them. On 28 February 2021, the parent company of the club Suning Holdings Group announced that operations were going to cease immediately due to financial difficulties.

On 15 March 2021, Gu returned to Hangzhou by joining second tier club Zhejiang FC on a free transfer. In his first season back he quickly established himself as a vital member of the team as the club gained promotion to the top tier at the end of the 2021 campaign.

On 10 September 2024, Chinese Football Association announced that Gu was banned from football-related activities in China for life for involving in match-fixing.

== International career ==
Gu was called up to the senior China squad for the 2018 FIFA World Cup qualification – AFC third round against South Korea and Iran. Gu made his debut for China on 6 September 2016 in a 0-0 draw against Iran, coming on as a substitute for injury Zeng Cheng in the 12th minute.

== Career statistics ==
Statistics accurate as of match played 31 January 2023.

Appearances and goals by club, season and competition
Club	Season	League			National Cup		Continental		Other		Total	
Club	Season	Division	Apps	Goals	Apps	Goals	Apps	Goals	Apps	Goals	Apps	Goals
Shanghai East Asia	2006	China League Two			-		-		-			
Shanghai East Asia	2007	China League Two			-		-		-			
Shanghai East Asia	2008	China League One	22	0	-		-		-		22	0
Shanghai East Asia	2009	China League One	19	0	-		-		-		19	0
Shanghai East Asia	2010	China League One	9	0	-		-		-		9	0
Shanghai East Asia	Total		50	0	0	0	0	0	0	0	50	0
Hangzhou Greentown	2011	Chinese Super League	4	0	0	0	0	0	-		4	0
Hangzhou Greentown	2012	Chinese Super League	1	0	1	0	-		-		2	0
Hangzhou Greentown	2013	Chinese Super League	13	0	1	0	-		-		14	0
Hangzhou Greentown	2014	Chinese Super League	30	0	0	0	-		-		30	0
Hangzhou Greentown	2015	Chinese Super League	30	0	1	0	-		-		31	0
Hangzhou Greentown	Total		78	0	3	0	0	0	0	0	81	0
Jiangsu Suning	2016	Chinese Super League	25	0	7	0	2	0	-		34	0
Jiangsu Suning	2017	Chinese Super League	20	0	2	0	1	0	-		23	0
Jiangsu Suning	2018	Chinese Super League	30	0	4	0	-		-		34	0
Jiangsu Suning	2019	Chinese Super League	22	0	0	0	-		-		22	0
Jiangsu Suning	2020	Chinese Super League	18	0	3	0	-		-		21	0
Jiangsu Suning	Total		115	0	16	0	3	0	0	0	131	0
Zhejiang FC	2021	China League One	30	0	0	0	-		2 (Note: Appearances in Promotion/Relegation Play-offs)	0	32	0
Zhejiang FC	2022	Chinese Super League	23	0	1	0	-		-		24	0
Zhejiang FC	Total		53	0	1	0	0	0	0	0	54	0
Career total			296	0	20	0	3	0	2	0	321	0

== Honours ==
=== Club ===
Shanghai East Asia

- China League Two: 2007

Jiangsu Suning

- Chinese Super League: 2020
