= Zhou Yun (footballer) =

Chinese footballer

Zhou Yun 周云
Personal information
- Full name: Zhou Yun
- Date of birth: 31 December 1990 (age 35)
- Place of birth: Zhangjiagang, Jiangsu, China
- Height: 1.83 m (6 ft 0 in)
- Position: Right-back

Senior career*
Years	Team	Apps	(Gls)
2008–2020	Jiangsu Suning	246	(2)

International career^{‡}
2013	China	3	(0)
- * Club domestic league appearances and goals as of 30 March 2021 ‡ National team caps and goals as of 30 March 2021

Zhou Yun (simplified Chinese: 周云; traditional Chinese: 周雲; pinyin: Zhōu Yún; born 31 December 1990) is a Chinese retired professional footballer who had only played for Chinese Super League club Jiangsu Suning in his entire career.

== Club career ==
Zhou Yun played for Jiangsu Sainty's academy until he was promoted to the senior team during the 2008 season. At the time, the club was competing in the second-tier League One and had already won the division title and promotion to the top tier. Jiangsu's manager Pei Encai decided to give Zhou his debut in the final game of the season against Yantai Yiteng on 15 November 2008 in a 2–0 victory. Zhou spent the following season on the bench as Pei Encai decided to stick with experienced players to keep Jiangsu in the Super League. In the 2010 season Zhou was given his chance to become a regular within the team. He played sixteen league games at the end of the season and helped guide the club to a mid-table finish. Zhou went on to become a vital member of the team's defence in 2011 as the club finished in their highest ever position of fourth. This would be followed by a 2015 Chinese FA Cup victory against Shanghai Shenhua.

On 28 February 2021, Suning Holdings Group halted their operations in Jiangsu Football Club due to financial predicament. On 30 March 2021, Zhou announced his retirement at the age of 30, one day after Jiangsu, as defending champions of the competition, was disqualified in entering new season's Chinese Super league.

== International career ==
Zhou was called up to the Chinese national team for the first time when he was included in the squad for a 2015 AFC Asian Cup qualifying match against Iraq that was held on 22 March 2013, however he did not play. Zhou made his debut in a friendly against Uzbekistan on 6 June 2013 in a 2–1 defeat.

== Career statistics ==
Statistics accurate as of match played 5 December 2020.

Appearances and goals by club, season and competition
Club	Season	League			National Cup		Continental		Other		Total	
Club	Season	Division	Apps	Goals	Apps	Goals	Apps	Goals	Apps	Goals	Apps	Goals
Jiangsu Sainty	2008	China League One	1	0	-		-		-		1	0
Jiangsu Sainty	2009	Chinese Super League	0	0	-		-		-		0	0
Jiangsu Sainty	2010	Chinese Super League	16	0	-		-		-		16	0
Jiangsu Sainty	2011	Chinese Super League	23	0	1	0	-		-		24	0
Jiangsu Sainty	2012	Chinese Super League	22	0	1	0	-		-		23	0
Jiangsu Sainty	2013	Chinese Super League	21	0	2	0	6	0	1 (Note: Appearances in Chinese FA Super Cup)	0	30	0
Jiangsu Sainty	2014	Chinese Super League	25	1	3	0	-		-		28	1
Jiangsu Sainty	2015	Chinese Super League	16	0	7	0	-		-		23	0
Jiangsu Sainty	2016	Chinese Super League	29	0	8	0	6	0	1	0	44	0
Jiangsu Sainty	2017	Chinese Super League	29	0	4	0	8	0	1	0	42	0
Jiangsu Sainty	2018	Chinese Super League	25	0	4	0	-		-		29	0
Jiangsu Sainty	2019	Chinese Super League	21	1	2	0	-		-		23	1
Jiangsu Sainty	2020	Chinese Super League	18	0	3	0	-		-		21	0
Jiangsu Sainty	Total		246	2	35	0	20	0	3	0	304	2
Career total			246	2	35	0	20	0	3	0	304	2

== Honours ==
=== Club ===
Jiangsu Sainty

- Chinese Super League: 2020
- China League One: 2008
- Chinese FA Cup: 2015
- Chinese FA Super Cup: 2013
