= Yang Xiaotian =

Chinese footballer (born 1990)

Yang Xiaotian 杨笑天
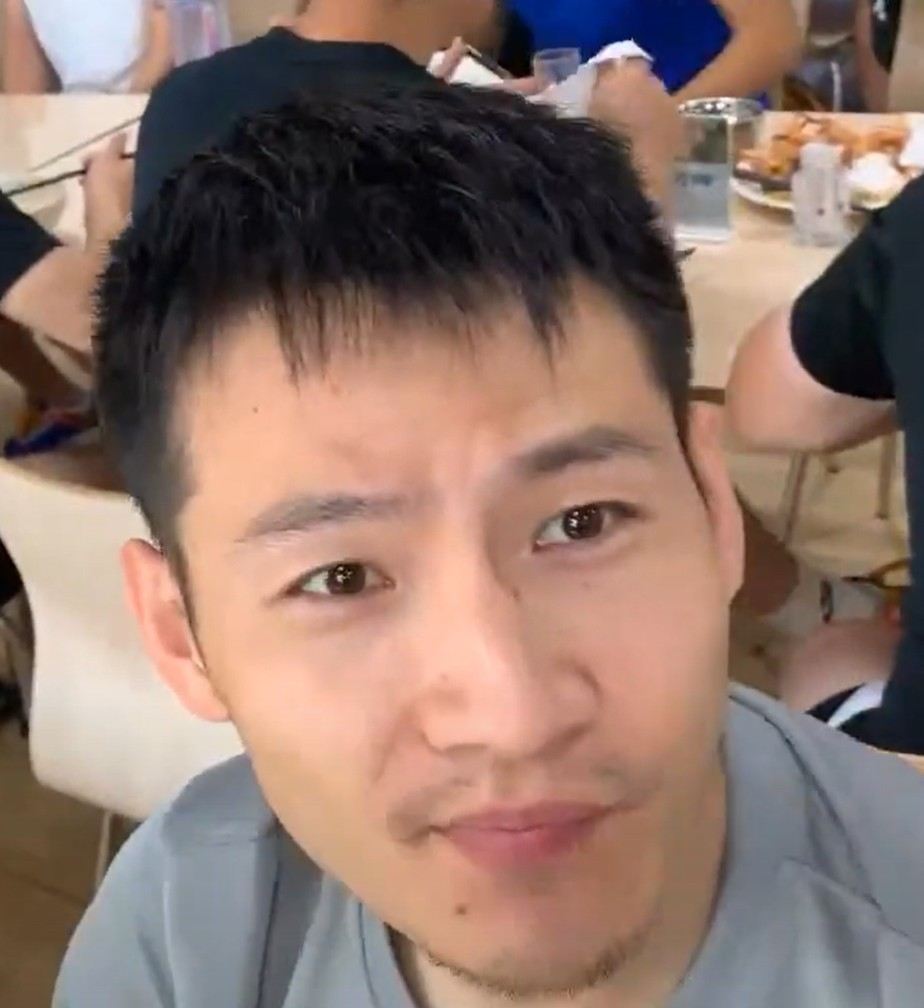
- Yang Xiaotian in June 2022

Personal information
- Date of birth: 26 March 1990 (age 36)
- Place of birth: Xi'an, Shaanxi, China
- Height: 1.78 m (5 ft 10 in)
- Position: Left-back

Youth career
- Jiangsu Youth

Senior career*
Years	Team	Apps	(Gls)
2010–2020	Jiangsu Suning	110	(2)
2021	Guangzhou City	16	(0)
2022–2023	Cangzhou Mighty Lions	24	(0)
- * Club domestic league appearances and goals as of 31 January 2023

Yang Xiaotian (simplified Chinese: 杨笑天; traditional Chinese: 楊笑天; pinyin: Yáng Xiàotiān; born 26 March 1990 in Xi'an) is a Chinese professional footballer who last played for Chinese Super League club Cangzhou Mighty Lions.

== Club career ==
Yang Xiaotian was born in Xi'an and moved to Lianyungang with his parents when he was a primary school student. Yang started his professional career with Chinese Super League side Jiangsu Sainty in 2010. He was sent to Serie A club Parma for further training along with his teammate Qu Cheng between February 2012 and March 2012. He made his senior debut on 14 April 2013, in a 3–0 away defeat against Guizhou Renhe, coming on as a substitute for Jiang Jiajun in the 46th minute. On 17 September 2014, he scored his first goal for Jiangsu in a 2–1 win against Harbin Yiteng.

On 11 April 2021, Yang joined fellow top tier club Guangzhou City for the start of the 2021 Chinese Super League season. He would make his debut in a league game on 20 April 2021 against Guangzhou F.C. in a 2-2 draw. After only a season he would leave to join another top tier club in Cangzhou Mighty Lions on 14 April 2022. He would make his debut in a league game on 5 June 2022 against Beijing Guoan F.C. in a 2-1 victory.

== Career statistics ==
Statistics accurate as of match played 31 January 2023.

Appearances and goals by club, season and competition
Club	Season	League			National Cup		Continental		Other		Total	
Club	Season	Division	Apps	Goals	Apps	Goals	Apps	Goals	Apps	Goals	Apps	Goals
Jiangsu Sainty/ Jiangsu Suning	2010	Chinese Super League	0	0	-		-		-		0	0
Jiangsu Sainty/ Jiangsu Suning	2011	Chinese Super League	0	0	0	0	-		-		0	0
Jiangsu Sainty/ Jiangsu Suning	2012	Chinese Super League	0	0	0	0	-		-		0	0
Jiangsu Sainty/ Jiangsu Suning	2013	Chinese Super League	1	0	0	0	0	0	0 (Note: Appearances in Chinese FA Super Cup)	0	1	0
Jiangsu Sainty/ Jiangsu Suning	2014	Chinese Super League	8	1	4	0	-		-		12	1
Jiangsu Sainty/ Jiangsu Suning	2015	Chinese Super League	25	0	4	0	-		-		29	0
Jiangsu Sainty/ Jiangsu Suning	2016	Chinese Super League	19	0	7	0	4	0	0	0	30	0
Jiangsu Sainty/ Jiangsu Suning	2017	Chinese Super League	21	1	1	0	8	0	1	0	31	1
Jiangsu Sainty/ Jiangsu Suning	2018	Chinese Super League	23	0	4	0	-		-		27	0
Jiangsu Sainty/ Jiangsu Suning	2019	Chinese Super League	13	0	1	0	-		-		14	0
Jiangsu Sainty/ Jiangsu Suning	Total		110	2	21	0	12	0	1	0	144	2
Guangzhou City	2021	Chinese Super League	16	0	1	0	-		-		17	0
Cangzhou Mighty Lions	2022	Chinese Super League	24	0	0	0	-		-		24	0
Career total			150	2	22	0	12	0	1	0	185	2

== Honours ==
=== Club ===
Jiangsu Sainty

- Chinese FA Cup: 2015
- Chinese FA Super Cup: 2013
