= Li Ang (footballer) =

Chinese footballer

Li Ang 李昂
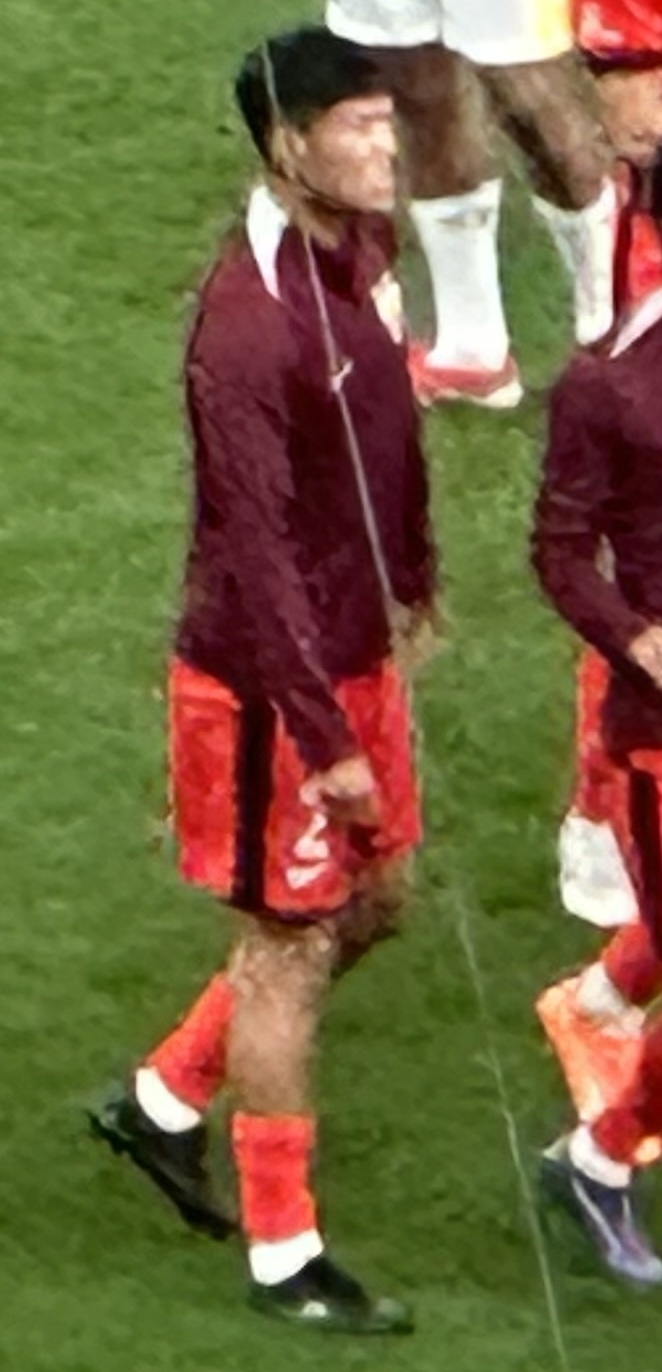
- Li Ang in May 2025

Personal information
- Full name: Li Ang
- Date of birth: 15 September 1993 (age 33)
- Place of birth: Xuzhou, Jiangsu, China
- Height: 1.87 m (6 ft 2 in)
- Positions: Centre-back; left-back

Team information
- Current team: Wuhan Three Towns (on loan from Dalian Yingbo)
- Number: 11

Youth career
- 2011–2012: Jiangsu Youth

Senior career*
Years	Team	Apps	(Gls)
2014–2020	Jiangsu Suning	165	(13)
2021–2025	Shanghai Port	71	(3)
2026–	Dalian Yingbo	11	(0)
2026–	→ Wuhan Three Towns (loan)	13	(1)

International career^{‡}
2011–2013	China U-19	10	(2)
2014–2015	China U-23	13	(2)
2014–	China	8	(0)
Medal record
Representing China
Men's football
EAFF Championship
Bronze medal – third place	2019 South Korea	Team
- * Club domestic league appearances and goals as of 22 November 2026 ‡ National team caps and goals as of 12 October 2021

Li Ang (Chinese: 李昂; pinyin: Lǐ Áng; Mandarin pronunciation: [lì ǎŋ]; born 15 September 1993) is a Chinese footballer who currently plays for Chinese Super League side Wuhan Three Towns, on loan from Dalian Yingbo and the China national team.

== Club career ==
Li Ang started his football career with Jiangsu Suning in 2014 after playing for Jiangsu Youth during the 2011 season and the 2012 season. He made his debut for the club in a league game on 8 March 2014 in a 0-0 draw against Guizhou Renhe. He scored his first goal for the club in a league game on 11 May 2014 in a 1-0 win against Changchun Yatai. Throughout the season he would go on to establish himself as an integral member of the team and would play in the 2014 Chinese FA Cup, which the club lost 5-4 on aggregate to Shandong Luneng Taishan. The following season Li would continue to cement his position within the team and go to win the 2015 Chinese FA Cup against Shanghai Shenhua.

Li would go on to be a consistent presence within the team as he won the 2020 Chinese Super League title with the club. On 28 February 2021, the parent company of the club Suning Holdings Group announced that operations were going to cease immediately due to financial difficulties. On 12 March 2021, Li was free to transfer to fellow top tier club Shanghai Port. He would make his debut for the club in a league game on 22 April 2021 against Tianjin Jinmen Tiger in a 6-1 victory.

On 20 January 2026, Li joined Chinese Super League side Dalian Yingbo as free agent.

On 25 June 2026, Li was loaned to Chinese Super League side Wuhan Three Towns for the rest of 2026 season.

== International career ==
Li made his debut for the Chinese national team on 22 June 2014 in a 0-0 draw against Macedonia.

== Career statistics ==
=== Club statistics ===
As of match played 16 April 2025.

Appearances and goals by club, season and competition
Club	Season	League			National Cup		Continental		Other		Total	
Club	Season	Division	Apps	Goals	Apps	Goals	Apps	Goals	Apps	Goals	Apps	Goals
Jiangsu Youth	2011	China League Two	13	1	-		-		-		13	1
Jiangsu Youth	2012	China League Two	16	1	-		-		-		16	1
Jiangsu Youth	Total		29	2	0	0	0	0	0	0	29	2
Jiangsu Suning	2014	Chinese Super League	27	1	7	1	-		-		34	2
Jiangsu Suning	2015	Chinese Super League	23	3	5	1	-		-		28	4
Jiangsu Suning	2016	Chinese Super League	22	2	5	0	3	0	1 (Note: Appearances in Chinese FA Super Cup)	0	31	2
Jiangsu Suning	2017	Chinese Super League	18	1	4	0	8	0	1	0	31	1
Jiangsu Suning	2018	Chinese Super League	29	3	4	0	-		-		33	3
Jiangsu Suning	2019	Chinese Super League	28	3	2	0	-		-		30	3
Jiangsu Suning	2020	Chinese Super League	18	0	6	2	-		-		24	2
Jiangsu Suning	Total		165	13	33	4	11	0	2	0	213	17
Shanghai Port	2021	Chinese Super League	13	1	1	0	-		-		14	1
Shanghai Port	2022	Chinese Super League	22	0	2	0	-		-		24	0
Shanghai Port	2023	Chinese Super League	21	1	1	0	0	0	-		22	1
Shanghai Port	2024	Chinese Super League	13	1	5	0	3	1	1	0	22	2
Shanghai Port	2025	Chinese Super League	2	0	0	0	4	0	1	0	7	0
Shanghai Port	Total		71	3	9	0	7	1	2	0	89	4
Career total			265	18	42	4	18	1	4	0	329	23

=== International statistics ===
National team
Year	Apps	Goals
2014	1	0
2015	1	0
2016	0	0
2017	0	0
2018	0	0
2019	3	0
2020	0	0
2021	3	0
Total	8	0

== Honours ==
Jiangsu Suning

- Chinese Super League: 2020
- Chinese FA Cup: 2015

Shanghai Port

- Chinese Super League: 2023, 2024, 2025
- Chinese FA Cup: 2024

Individual

- Chinese Super League Team of the Year: 2019
