= Ji Xiang (footballer) =

Chinese footballer

Ji Xiang 吉翔
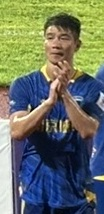
- Ji Xiang in August 2024

Personal information
- Full name: Ji Xiang
- Date of birth: 1 March 1990 (age 36)
- Place of birth: Yangzhou, Jiangsu, China
- Height: 1.85 m (6 ft 1 in)
- Positions: Right winger; right-back

Team information
- Current team: Jiangsu Changjin
- Number: 24

Senior career*
Years	Team	Apps	(Gls)
2008–2020	Jiangsu Suning	255	(23)
2021–2025	Shandong Taishan	42	(0)
2024	→ Nanjing City (loan)	14	(0)
2025	→ Nanjing City (loan)	21	(0)
2026–	Jiangsu Changjin	0	(0)

International career^{‡}
2014–	China	11	(1)
Medal record
Representing China
Men's football
EAFF Championship
Silver medal – second place	2015 China	Team
Bronze medal – third place	2019 South Korea	Team
- * Club domestic league appearances and goals as of 13:56, 8 March 2026 (UTC) ‡ National team caps and goals as of 11 June 2021

Ji Xiang (Chinese: 吉翔; pinyin: Jí Xiáng; born 1 March 1990) is a Chinese professional footballer who currently plays as a right winger or right-back for Jiangsu Changjin.

== Club career ==
Ji Xiang started his professional football career with Jiangsu Suning in the 2008 season when he was promoted to their senior team. He would go on to make his debut on October 18, 2008 in a league game against Qingdao Hailifeng in a 2-0 victory where he came on as a substitute. At the end of the league season Ji Xiang would go on to be part of the squad that won the division title and promotion to the top tier of Chinese football. In the top tier the Jiangsu manager, Pei Encai was initially reluctant to use Ji Xiang, however by the 2010 league season he showed more faith in him, which saw Ji Xiang repay him by scoring his first goal for the club on August 22, 2010 against Qingdao Jonoon in a 4-0 victory.

By the following season he would establish himself as a regular within the team despite Pei Encai leaving and in the 2012 season, Ji broke the record for the fastest goal in Chinese Super League history, scoring a goal timed at 7 seconds in a 1-1 draw against Guangzhou Evergrande on 20 October 2012. Now an establish integral part of the team he would go on to win the 2015 Chinese FA Cup against Shanghai Shenhua. This would be followed by the 2020 Chinese Super League title when he would win the clubs first league title with them. On 28 February 2021, the parent company of the club Suning Holdings Group announced that operations were going to cease immediately due to financial difficulties.

On 23 March 2021 he would join top tier club Shandong Taishan on a free transfer. He made his debut for the club on 20 April 2021 in a league game against Chongqing Liangjiang Athletic that ended in a 2-0 victory. He would immediately establish himself as an integral member of the team that went on to the win the 2021 Chinese Super League title and 2021 Chinese FA Cup. This would be followed up by him winning the 2022 Chinese FA Cup with them the next season.

== International career ==
Ji made his debut for the Chinese national team on 13 December 2014 in a 4-0 win against Kyrgyzstan. However, this match was not recognised as an international "A" match by FIFA. He finally made his official debut on 21 December 2014 in a 0-0 draw against Palestine.

== Career statistics ==
=== Club statistics ===
As of 31 January 2023.

Appearances and goals by club, season and competition
Club	Season	League			National Cup		Continental		Other		Total	
Club	Season	Division	Apps	Goals	Apps	Goals	Apps	Goals	Apps	Goals	Apps	Goals
Jiangsu Suning	2008	China League One	3	0	-		-		-		3	0
Jiangsu Suning	2009	Chinese Super League	0	0	-		-		-		0	0
Jiangsu Suning	2010	Chinese Super League	13	4	-		-		-		13	4
Jiangsu Suning	2011	Chinese Super League	23	2	1	0	-		-		24	2
Jiangsu Suning	2012	Chinese Super League	30	6	1	1	-		-		31	7
Jiangsu Suning	2013	Chinese Super League	20	1	1	0	4	0	1 (Note: Appearances in Chinese FA Super Cup)	0	26	1
Jiangsu Suning	2014	Chinese Super League	23	1	5	1	-		-		28	2
Jiangsu Suning	2015	Chinese Super League	29	0	6	0	-		-		35	0
Jiangsu Suning	2016	Chinese Super League	28	5	7	1	6	2	1	0	42	8
Jiangsu Suning	2017	Chinese Super League	26	2	3	1	5	1	1	0	35	4
Jiangsu Suning	2018	Chinese Super League	22	2	4	1	-		-		26	3
Jiangsu Suning	2019	Chinese Super League	20	0	2	0	-		-		22	0
Jiangsu Suning	2020	Chinese Super League	18	0	5	0	-		-		23	0
Jiangsu Suning	Total		255	23	35	5	15	3	3	0	308	31
Shandong Taishan	2021	Chinese Super League	14	0	6	0	—		—		20	0
Shandong Taishan	2022	Chinese Super League	25	0	3	0	0	0	—		28	0
Shandong Taishan	Total		39	0	9	0	0	0	0	0	48	0
Career total			294	23	44	5	15	3	3	0	356	31

=== International statistics ===
National team
Year	Apps	Goals
2014	1	0
2015	7	0
2016	0	0
2017	0	0
2018	0	0
2019	2	1
2020	0	0
2021	1	0
Total	11	1

=== International goals ===
As of 18 December 2019
Scores and results list China's goal tally first.

No.	Date	Venue	Opponent	Score	Result	Competition
1.	18 December 2019	Busan Asiad Main Stadium, Busan, South Korea	Hong Kong	1–0	2–0	2019 EAFF E-1 Football Championship

== Honours ==
=== Club ===
Jiangsu Suning

- Chinese Super League: 2020
- China League One: 2008
- Chinese FA Super Cup: 2013
- Chinese FA Cup: 2015

Shandong Taishan

- Chinese Super League: 2021
- Chinese FA Cup: 2021, 2022
