= 2012 Jiangsu Sainty F.C. season =

Jiangsu Sainty 2012
- Chairman: (China) Liu Jun
- Manager: (Serbia) Dragan Okuka
- Super League: 2nd
- FA Cup: Third round
- Top goalscorer: League: (Romania) Cristian Dănălache (23); All: (Romania) Cristian Dănălache (23)
- Highest home attendance: 65,769 vs Guangzhou Evergrande; 20 October 2012
- Lowest home attendance: 20,953 vs Dalian Shide; 1 April 2012
- Average home league attendance: 29,615
Home colours	Away colours

The 2012 Jiangsu Sainty season is Jiangu Sainty's 4th consecutive season in the Chinese Super League after promotion in the 2008 season. They also competed in the Chinese FA Cup that year, getting knocked out in that competition.

== Players ==
=== First team squad ===
As of 30 October 2012

Note: Flags indicate national team as defined under FIFA eligibility rules; some limited exceptions apply. Players may hold more than one non-FIFA nationality.

No.	Pos.	Nation	Player
1	GK	CHN	Deng Xiaofei
2	MF	CHN	Cao Rui
3	DF	BRA	Eleílson
4	DF	CHN	Xu Youzhi
5	DF	CHN	Zhou Yun
6	DF	CHN	Jiang Jiajun
8	MF	CHN	Liu Jianye
9	MF	CHN	Lu Bofei (captain)
10	FW	ROU	Cristian Dănălache
11	FW	CHN	Wang Yunlong
12	DF	CHN	Ai Zhibo
13	MF	CHN	Wang Jie
14	FW	CHN	Tang Miao
15	FW	CHN	Ge Wei
16	MF	CHN	Deng Zhuoxiang
17	FW	CHN	Qu Cheng
18	DF	CHN	Li Chi

No.	Pos.	Nation	Player
19	MF	CHN	Qian Zhelong
20	FW	CHN	Sun Ke
21	MF	BLR	Sergey Krivets
23	DF	CHN	Ren Hang
24	MF	CHN	Ji Xiang
25	MF	CHN	Ye Hui
26	GK	CHN	Guan Zhen
28	DF	CHN	Yang Xiaotian
29	MF	CHN	Liu Ji
32	GK	CHN	Liu Jun
33	DF	CHN	Xiong Tao
35	MF	CHN	Zhu Chao
36	MF	CHN	Sun Xiang
38	FW	SRB	Aleksandar Jevtić
39	DF	UZB	Kamoliddin Tajiev
40	FW	CHN	Du Wenhui

=== Reserve squad ===
Note: Flags indicate national team as defined under FIFA eligibility rules; some limited exceptions apply. Players may hold more than one non-FIFA nationality.

No.	Pos.	Nation	Player
27	MF	CHN	Wang Guanyu
30	FW	CHN	Li Zhenhuan
31	FW	CHN	Zhang Jiabei

=== Out on loan ===
Note: Flags indicate national team as defined under FIFA eligibility rules; some limited exceptions apply. Players may hold more than one non-FIFA nationality.

No.	Pos.	Nation	Player
-	MF	CHN	Liu Qing (at Qinghai Senke until 31 December 2012)

== Transfers ==
=== Winter ===
In:

No.	Pos.	Nation	Player
4	MF	CHN	Xu Youzhi (from Chongqing Lifan)
6	DF	CHN	Jiang Jiajun (from Shanghai Shenhua)
7	FW	SRB	Miljan Mrdaković (from AEK Larnaca)
11	FW	CHN	Wang Yunlong (from Shanghai East Asia)
16	MF	CHN	Deng Zhuoxiang (from Shandong Luneng)
29	MF	CHN	Liu Ji (loan return from Guizhou Zhicheng)
35	MF	CHN	Zhu Chao (from Sainty Youth)
36	MF	CHN	Sun Xiang (from Sainty Youth)
-	DF	CHN	Wang Xiang (loan return from Chongqing FC)

Out:

No.	Pos.	Nation	Player
7	FW	CHN	Tan Si (to Wuhan Zall)
13	MF	CHN	Zhang Bo (to Chengdu Blades)
16	DF	CHN	Qiu Bing (to Qinghai Senke)
21	MF	PER	Paolo de la Haza (to Universidad César Vallejo)
25	MF	CHN	Liu Qing (loan to Qinghai Senke)
30	DF	CHN	Tang Jing (retired)
37	DF	CHN	Liu Yu (to Dalian Aerbin)
40	GK	CHN	Lu Zheyu (loan return to Tianjin TEDA)
-	DF	CHN	Wang Xiang (to Hebei Zhongji)

=== Summer ===
In:

No.	Pos.	Nation	Player
21	MF	BLR	Sergey Krivets (from Lech Poznań)
25	MF	CHN	Ye Hui (from Rayong FC)
30	FW	CHN	Li Zhenhuan (from Hebei Zhongji)
31	FW	CHN	Zhang Jiabei (from Hebei Zhongji)

Out:

No.	Pos.	Nation	Player
7	FW	SRB	Miljan Mrdaković (released)

== Competitions ==
=== Chinese Super League ===
==== League table ====
Pos	Team	Pld	W	D	L	GF	GA	GD	Pts	Qualification or relegation
1	Guangzhou Evergrande (C)	30	17	7	6	51	30	+21	58	2013 AFC Champions League group stage (Note: Guizhou Moutai qualified for the 2013 AFC Champions League because league champions Guangzhou Evergrande also won the 2012 Chinese FA Cup.)
2	Jiangsu Sainty	30	14	12	4	49	29	+20	54	2013 AFC Champions League group stage
3	Beijing Guoan	30	14	6	10	34	35	−1	48	2013 AFC Champions League group stage
4	Guizhou Moutai	30	12	9	9	44	33	+11	45	2013 AFC Champions League group stage
5	Dalian Aerbin	30	11	11	8	51	46	+5	44 (Note: Dalian 1–2 Changchun; Changchun 1–2 Dalian)	

Source: Chinese Super League (in Chinese)
Rules for classification: 1) points; 2) goal difference; 3) number of goals scored; 4) head-to-head goals scored; 5) goal difference; 6) goals scored; 7) disciplinary points (1 point for each yellow card, 3 points for each red card). Head-to-Head: Only used at the end of the season when two or more teams need the head-to-head rules to break a tie.
(C) Champions

==== Matches ====
10 March 2012 Round 1	Shanghai Shenhua	1 – 1	Jiangsu Sainty	Shanghai
19:35 UTC+8	Griffiths 57'	Report	11' Jevtić	Stadium: Hongkou Football Stadium; Attendance: 17,227; Referee: Cui Dayou

17 March 2012 Round 2	Jiangsu Sainty	3 – 0	Hangzhou Greentown	Nanjing, Jiangsu
15:30 UTC+8	Dănălache (yellow card) 41'; Lu Bofei 53' (yellow card) 66'; Jiang Jiajun 76'; Eleílson (yellow card) 84'; Mrdaković 88'	Report	(yellow card) 10' Renato; (yellow card) 17' Tang Jiashu; (yellow card) 52' Zheng Kewei	Stadium: Nanjing Olympic Sports Center; Attendance: 21,432; Referee: Wang Jin

25 March 2012 Round 3	Tianjin Teda	0 – 0	Jiangsu Sainty	Tianjin
19:30 UTC+8	Wang Xinxin (yellow card) 44'; Hui Jiakang (yellow card) 69'	Report	(yellow card) 43' Jevtić	Stadium: TEDA Football Stadium; Attendance: 9,803

1 April 2012 Round 4	Jiangsu Sainty	5 – 0	Dalian Shide	Nanjing, Jiangsu
15:30 UTC+8	Ji Xiang 25'; Sun Ke 47' 55'; Dănălache 78' 88'	Report	Yan Feng (yellow card) 68'	Stadium: Nanjing Olympic Sports Center; Attendance: 20,953

7 April 2012 Round 5	Shandong Luneng	0 – 0	Jiangsu Sainty	Jinan, Shandong
19:30 UTC+8	Antar (yellow card) 90'	Report	(yellow card) 11' Dănălache	Stadium: Hongkou Football Stadium

16 April 2012 Round 6	Jiangsu Sainty	1 – 0	Liaoning Whowin	Nanjing, Jiangsu
20:40 UTC+8	Sun Xiang 15'; Ren Hang (yellow card) 38'	Report	Ding Jie (yellow card) 40' (yellow-red card) 51'; Zheng Tao (yellow card) 88'	Stadium: Nanjing Olympic Sports Center; Attendance: 24,763; Referee: Wang Jin

22 April 2012 Round 7	Shanghai Shenxin	0 – 1	Jiangsu Sainty	Shanghai
16:40 UTC+8	Anselmo (yellow card) 20'	Report	Dănălache 81'	Stadium: Jinshan Sports Centre; Attendance: 7,644; Referee: Huang Yejun

28 April 2012 Round 8	Jiangsu Sainty	5 – 1	Henan Jianye	Nanjing, Jiangsu
20:40 UTC+8	Jevtić 2'; Dănălache 36', 45+1', 58'; Lu Bofei 51'	Report	Zhao Peng (yellow card) 38'; Xu Yang 70'	Stadium: Nanjing Olympic Sports Center; Attendance: 26,872; Referee: Ma Li

5 May 2012 Round 9	Guizhou Renhe	3 – 1	Jiangsu Sainty	Guiyang, Guizhou
20:30 UTC+8	Djulbic 5'; Yu Hai (yellow card) 52' (yellow-red card) 88'; Rafa Jordà 65'; Muslimović 70'; Dong Yang (yellow card) 81'	Report	Sun Ke (yellow card) 23'; Dănălache 36'; Liu Jianye (yellow card) 52'; Eleílson (yellow card) 59'	Stadium: Guiyang Olympic Sports Center; Attendance: 22,111; Referee: Guo Baolong

12 May 2012 Round 10	Jiangsu Sainty	1 – 2	Changchun Yatai	Nanjing, Jiangsu
20:40 UTC+8	Li Chi (yellow card) 45'; Eleílson 67'	Report	Weldon 45' (yellow card) 84'; Zhang Wenzhao (yellow card) 48'; Cao Tianbao 58'; Lü Jianjun (yellow card) 71'	Stadium: Nanjing Olympic Sports Center; Attendance: 28,985; Referee: Zhou Gang

19 May 2012 Round 11	Dalian Aerbin	1 – 1	Jiangsu Sainty	Dalian, Liaoning
16:30 UTC+8	Sterjovski (yellow card) 10'; Wang Hongyou (yellow card) 14'; Canales 73' (pen.) (yellow card) 90'	Report	Jiang Jiajun (yellow card) 9'; Dănălache 38'	Stadium: Jinzhou Stadium; Attendance: 15,061; Referee: Yao Qing

27 May 2012 Round 12	Jiangsu Sainty	1 – 0	Qingdao Jonoon	Nanjing, Jiangsu
20:40 UTC+8	Liu Jianye (yellow card) 47'; Jevtić 77'; Eleílson (yellow card) 86'	Report	Liu Zhenli (yellow card) 60'	Stadium: Nanjing Olympic Sports Center; Attendance: 24,796; Referee: Zhou Gang

17 June 2012 Round 13	Guangzhou Evergrande	5 – 1	Jiangsu Sainty	Guangzhou, Guangdong
20:35 UTC+8	Conca 10'; Jiang Ning 55'; Muriqui 58', 62', 90'; Zhang Linpeng (yellow card) 68'	Report	Liu Jianye (yellow card) 58'; Lu Bofei (yellow card) 65'; Qu Cheng 67'	Stadium: Tianhe Stadium; Attendance: 37,865; Referee: Huang Yejun

23 June 2012 Round 14	Beijing Guoan	0 – 1	Jiangsu Sainty	Beijing
20:30 UTC+8	Matić (yellow card) 9'; Mao Jianqing (yellow card) 29'	Report	Lu Bofei (yellow card) 6'; Ren Hang 23'; Jevtić (yellow card) 31'; Sun Ke (yellow card) 69'; Deng Xiaofei (yellow card) 78'; Jiang Jiajun (yellow card) 85'; Qu Cheng (yellow card) 90'	Stadium: Workers Stadium; Attendance: 38,999; Referee: Zhou Gang

1 July 2012 Round 15	Jiangsu Sainty	3 – 1	Guangzhou R&F	Nanjing, Jiangsu
20:40 UTC+8	Eleílson (yellow card) 13' (goal) 61'; Ren Hang (yellow card) 25'; Dănălache 28', 88'; Liu Jianye (yellow card) 74'	Report	Rafael Coelho 18'; Li Wenbo (yellow card) 27'; Griffiths (yellow card) 86'	Stadium: Nanjing Olympic Sports Center; Attendance: 24,971; Referee: Wang Zhe

8 July 2012 Round 16	Jiangsu Sainty	2 – 2	Shanghai Shenhua	Nanjing, Jiangsu
20:40 UTC+8	Dănălache 44' (pen.), 59' (pen.)	Report	Lin 48'; Moisés 75'	Stadium: Nanjing Olympic Sports Center

14 July 2012 Round 17	Hangzhou Greentown	1 – 2	Jiangsu Sainty	Hangzhou, Zhejiang
20:35 UTC+8	Wang Song 21'	Report	Ji Xiang 6'; Dănălache 16'; Du Wenhui (yellow card) 20' (yellow-red card) 70'; Eleílson (yellow card) 22'	Stadium: Yellow Dragon Stadium

22 July 2012 Round 18	Jiangsu Sainty	3 – 2	Tianjin Teda	Nanjing, Jiangsu
20:40 UTC+8	Dănălache 10', 42'; Ji Xiang 23'	Report	Lu Bofei 21' (o.g.); Jovančić 26'	Stadium: Nanjing Olympic Sports Center

29 July 2012 Round 19	Dalian Shide	1 – 3	Jiangsu Sainty	Dalian, Liaoning
20:00 UTC+8	Chamanga 65'	Report	Dănălache 61'; Eleílson 70' (yellow card) 90+3'; Krivets 90+3'	Stadium: Jinzhou Stadium

5 August 2012 Round 20	Jiangsu Sainty	3 – 3	Shandong Luneng Taishan	Nanjing, Jiangsu
20:40 UTC+8	Dănălache 6', 30', 45' (pen.); Liu Jianye (yellow card) 41'; Ji Xiang (yellow card) 66'; Krivets (yellow card) 84'; Qu Cheng (yellow card) 86'	Report	Du Wei 2' (yellow card) 29'; Lü Zheng 18' (yellow card) 36'; Simão Mate Junior (yellow card) 51' (goal) 59'	Stadium: Nanjing Olympic Sports Center; Attendance: 32,935; Referee: Ai Kun

11 August 2012 Round 21	Liaoning Whowin	0 – 0	Jiangsu Sainty	Tiexi District, Liaoning
20:30 UTC+8	Yang Yu (yellow card) 23'; Zhao Junzhe (yellow card) 60'; Wu Gaojun (yellow card) 73'	Report		Stadium: Tiexi New District Sports Center; Attendance: 17,654; Referee: Huang Yejun

18 August 2012 Round 22	Jiangsu Sainty	1 – 1	Shanghai Shenxin	Nanjing, Jiangsu
20:40 UTC+8	Dănălache 43' (pen.); Jevtić (yellow card) 54'; Du Wenhui (yellow card) 81'	Summary	Wang Yun 29'; Zou Zhongting (yellow card) 41'; Johnny (yellow card) 42'; Salley (yellow card) 53'	Stadium: Nanjing Olympic Sports Center; Attendance: 22,385; Referee: Prathan Nasawang

25 August 2012 Round 23	Henan Jianye	0 – 3	Jiangsu Sainty	Zhengzhou, Henan
20:45 UTC+8		Summary	Jevtić 13'; Jiang Jiajun (yellow card) 37'; Dănălache 84', 90'	Stadium: Zhengzhou Hanghai Stadium; Attendance: 14,528; Referee: Yudai Yamamoto

15 September 2012 Round 24	Jiangsu Sainty	2 – 0	Guizhou Renhe	Nanjing, Jiangsu
20:40 UTC+8	Jevtić (yellow card) 36' (goal) 62'; Jiang Jiajun (yellow card) 59'; Sun Ke (yellow card) 88'; Dănălache 90+2'	Summary	Yu Hai (yellow card) 36'; Nano (yellow card) 47'; Liu Tianqi (yellow card) 71'; Sun Jihai (yellow card) 90'	Stadium: Nanjing Olympic Sports Center; Attendance: 34,873; Referee: Tao Rancheng

24 September 2012 Round 25	Changchun Yatai	0 – 0	Jiangsu Sainty	Changchun, Jilin
20:35 UTC+8	Ismailov (yellow card) 39'; Lü Jianjun (yellow card) 43'; Pei Shuai (yellow card) 49'	Summary	Jiang Jiajun (yellow card) 28'; Ji Xiang (yellow card) 52'	Stadium: Development Area Stadium; Attendance: 10,157; Referee: Wang Di

30 September 2012 Round 26	Jiangsu Sainty	3 – 2	Dalian Aerbin	Nanjing, Jiangsu
20:40 UTC+8	Ji Xiang 4'; Tajiev (yellow card) 26'; Dănălache 40', 90' (pen.); Ren Hang (yellow card) 66'; Jiang Jiajun (yellow card) 72'	Summary	Fábio Rochemback 52'; Zhou Tong 68' (yellow card) 69'; Wang Jun (yellow card) 75'; Jin Pengxiang (yellow card) 90+4'	Stadium: Nanjing Olympic Sports Center

6 October 2012 Round 27	Qingdao Jonoon	1 – 0	Jiangsu Sainty	Qingdao, Shandong
20:30 UTC+8	Ibrahimov (yellow card) 9' (goal) 36'; Liu Jian (yellow card) 79'; Guo Liang (yellow card) 90+2'	Summary	Lu Bofei (yellow card) 61'	Stadium: Qingdao Tiantai Stadium

20 October 2012 Round 28	Jiangsu Sainty	1 - 1	Guangzhou Evergrande	Nanjing, Jiangsu
20:30 UTC+8	Ji Xiang 1'		Jiang Ning 49'	Stadium: Nanjing Olympic Sports Center; Attendance: 65,769; Referee: Fan Qi

27 October 2012 Round 29	Jiangsu Sainty	0 - 0	Beijing Guoan	Nanjing, Jiangsu
16:30 UTC+8	Eleílson (red card) 80'		Li Tixiang (yellow card) 45'; Yang Zhi (yellow card) 84'	Stadium: Nanjing Olympic Sports Center

3 November 2012 Round 30	Guangzhou R&F	1 - 1	Jiangsu Sainty	Guangzhou, Guangdong
15:30 UTC+8	Lu Bofei (yellow card) 13'; Jiang Jiajun (yellow card) 58'; Ji Xiang (yellow card) 60'; Lu Lin 90'		Li Yan (yellow card) 20'; Sun Ke 32'; Liu Cheng (yellow card) 82'	Stadium: Yuexiushan Stadium

=== Chinese FA Cup ===
27 June 2012 Third round	Jiangsu Sainty	1 – 1 (5 - 6 p)	Chengdu Blades	Nanjing
20:40	Ji Xiang 14'	Report	Gao Xiang 70'	Stadium: Nanjing Olympic Sports Center; Attendance: 10,259; Referee: Tang Kun
	Penalties
	Dănălache (penalty scored); Lu Bofei (penalty scored); Jevtić (penalty scored); Sun Ke (penalty missed); Wang Yunlong (penalty scored); Liu Jianye (penalty missed)		(penalty scored) Valdo; (penalty missed) Wang Cun; (penalty scored) William; (penalty scored) Gao Xiang; (penalty scored) Zhang Bo; (penalty scored) Chen Bo
