= 2016 Jiangsu Suning F.C. season =

Jiangsu Suning F.C.
2016 season
- Owner: Suning Commerce Group
- Manager: Dan Petrescu
- Stadium: Nanjing Olympic Sports Center
- Super League: 2nd
- FA Super Cup: Runner-up
- AFC Champions League: Group stage
Home colours	Away colours

The 2016 Jiangsu Suning F.C. season is the club's eighth consecutive season in Chinese Super League. On 21 December 2015 the club was purchased by Suning Commerce Group for ¥523 million and changed their name as Jiangsu Suning F.C. Jiangsu Suning are also competing in the 2016 Chinese FA Super Cup, 2016 Chinese FA Cup, and the 2016 AFC Champions League.

== Squad ==
As of 29 February 2016

Note: Flags indicate national team as defined under FIFA eligibility rules; some limited exceptions apply. Players may hold more than one non-FIFA nationality.

No.	Pos.	Nation	Player
1	GK	CHN	Gu Chao
2	DF	CHN	Li Ang
5	DF	CHN	Zhou Yun
6	DF	AUS	Trent Sainsbury
7	MF	BRA	Ramires
8	MF	CHN	Liu Jianye
9	FW	BRA	Jô
10	MF	BRA	Alex Teixeira
11	MF	CHN	Xie Pengfei
12	MF	CHN	Zhang Xiaobin
13	FW	CHN	Tao Yuan
14	FW	CHN	Qu Cheng
15	MF	CHN	Cao Kang
16	MF	CRO	Sammir
17	DF	CHN	Xu Youzhi

No.	Pos.	Nation	Player
18	FW	CHN	Zhang Wei
19	MF	CHN	Yang Hao
20	MF	CHN	Zhang Xinlin
21	MF	CHN	Li Zhichao
22	MF	CHN	Wu Xi (captain)
23	DF	CHN	Ren Hang
24	MF	CHN	Ji Xiang
25	GK	CHN	Jiang Hao
28	DF	CHN	Yang Xiaotian
29	MF	CHN	Yang Jiawei
30	GK	CHN	Zhang Sipeng
32	DF	CHN	Liu Wei
33	FW	CHN	Gu Wenxiang
34	MF	CHN	Cao Wen
40	FW	CHN	Ge Wei

== Transfers ==
In January, Jiangsu Suning broke their transfer fee record twice in the same window, with a fee of £25 million paid for Ramires from Chelsea F.C., and later fellow Brazilian Alex Teixeira for a fee of €50 million (£37 million) from Shakhtar Donetsk

=== In ===
==== Winter ====
Pos	Player	Transferred From	Fee	Source
GK	(China) Gu Chao	(China) Hangzhou Greentown F.C.	€7,000,000	
MF	(China) Yang Jiawei	(China) Shanghai Shenxin	€6,750,000	
MF	(China) Li Zhichao	(China) Henan Jianye	€2,000,000	
RW	(China) Xie Pengfei	(China) Hangzhou Greentown F.C.	€4,000,000	
MF	(Brazil) Ramires	(England) Chelsea	€28,000,000	
AM	(Brazil) Alex Teixeira	(Ukraine) Shakhtar Donetsk	€50,000,000	
ST	(Brazil) Jô	(United Arab Emirates) Al Shabab	€2,000,000	
CB	(Australia) Trent Sainsbury	(Netherlands) PEC Zwolle	€1,000,000	
DF	(China) Liu Wei	Reserve squad		

=== Out ===
==== Winter ====
Pos	Player	Transferred To	Fee	Source
RW	(China) Sun Ke	(China) Tianjin Quanjian F.C.	€9,000,000	
ST	(Iceland) Viðar Örn Kjartansson	(Sweden) Malmö FF	€325,000	
ST	(Colombia) Édison Toloza	(Colombia) Junior F.C.	Free transfer	
GK	(China) Deng Xiaofei	(China) Chongqing Lifan	Free transfer	
RW	(China) Bari Mamatil	(China) Qingdao Huanghai F.C.	Free transfer	
CB	(Iceland) Sölvi Ottesen	(China) Wuhan Zall	Free transfer	
DF	(China) Miao Ming	(China) Baoding Yingli ETS		
MF	(China) Lu Bofei	End of career		

== Competitions ==
=== Overview ===
Competition	Record							
Competition	G	W	D	L	GF	GA	GD	Win %
Chinese Super League	10	6	3	1	14	5	+9	60.00
Chinese FA Super Cup	1	0	0	1	0	2	−2	0.00
Champions League	6	2	3	1	10	7	+3	33.33
Total	17	8	6	3	24	14	+10	47.06

Updated to match played 21 May 2016
Source: Competitions

=== Chinese FA Super Cup ===
Win Draw Loss

27 February 2016	Guangzhou Evergrande Taobao	2–0	Jiangsu Suning	Olympic Sports Center, Chongqing
19:35 UTC+8	Goulart 14', 39'	Report		Attendance: 50,380; Referee: Tan Hai (Beijing)

=== Chinese Super League ===
Win Draw Loss Upcoming fixture

5 March 2016 1	Jiangsu Suning	3–0	Shandong Luneng Taishan	Nanjing
19:05 CST	Ramires 3'; Teixeira 66', 85'	Report		Stadium: Nanjing Olympic Sports Center; Attendance: 48,759; Referee: Fan Qi

11 March 2016 2	Jiangsu Suning	2–1	Yanbian Funde	Nanjing
18:35 CST	Zhang Xiaobin 36'; Li Ang 71'	Report	Yoon Bit-Garam 61'	Stadium: Nanjing Olympic Sports Center; Attendance: 35,193; Referee: Lin Jun

2 April 2016 3	Hebei China Fortune	1–1	Jiangsu Suning	Qinhuangdao
18:35 CST	Mbia 59'	Report	Ramires 22'	Stadium: Qinhuangdao Olympic Sports Center Stadium; Attendance: 24,368; Referee: Wang Zhe

9 April 2016 4	Henan Jianye	0–1	Jiangsu Suning	Zhangzhou
18:35 CST		Report	Ji Xiang 87'	Stadium: Zhengzhou Hanghai Stadium; Attendance: 21,233; Referee: Huang Yejun

16 April 2016 5	Jiangsu Suning	2–0	Shanghai Greenland Shenhua	Nanjing
18:35 CST	Ren Hang 83', 90+1'	Report		Stadium: Nanjing Olympic Sports Center; Attendance: 45,418; Referee: Zhou Gang

23 April 2016 6	Guangzhou R&F	1–1	Jiangsu Suning	Guangzhou
14:30 CST	Zeng Chao 82'	Report	Jô 90+2' (pen.)	Stadium: Yuexiushan Stadium; Attendance: 10,978; Referee: Lin Liu

29 April 2016 7	Jiangsu Suning	2–0	Changchun Yatai	Nanjing
18:35 CST	Ren Hang 8'; Ji Xiang 52'	Report		Stadium: Nanjing Olympic Sports Center; Attendance: 35,069; Referee: Chen Gang

8 May 2016 8	Beijing Guoan	1–2	Jiangsu Suning	Beijing
18:35 UTC+8	Zhao Hejing 24'	Report	Sammir 14'; Li Ang 64'	Stadium: Workers' Stadium; Attendance: 41,755; Referee: Hei Xiaohu

14 May 2016 9	Jiangsu Suning	0–0	Shijiazhuang Ever Bright	Nanjing
18:35 CST		Report		Stadium: Nanjing Olympic Sports Center; Attendance: 37,513; Referee: Ai Kun

21 May 2016 10	Tianjin Teda	1–0	Jiangsu Suning	Tianjin
18:35 UTC+8	Diagne 24'	Report		Stadium: Tianjin Olympic Center Stadium; Attendance: 26,568; Referee: Fan Qi

29 May 2016 11	Jiangsu Suning	1–1	Hangzhou Greentown	Nanjing
18:35 CST	Jô 27'	Report	Cahill 88'	Stadium: Nanjing Olympic Sports Center; Attendance: 36,233; Referee: Gu Chunhan

12 June 2016 12	Shanghai SIPG	1–2	Jiangsu Suning	Shanghai
18:35 UTC+8	Gyan 62'	Report	Ramires 20'; Jô 68' (pen.)	Stadium: Shanghai Stadium; Attendance: 32,426; Referee: Hai Tan

18 June 2016 13	Jiangsu Suning	2–1	Chongqing Lifan	Nanjing
18:35 CST	Liu Yu 58' (o.g.); Teixeira 90+3'	Report	Wang Dong 45+1'	Stadium: Nanjing Olympic Sports Center; Attendance: 35,619; Referee: Chen Gang

25 June 2016 14	Guangzhou Evergrande Taobao	2–0	Jiangsu Suning	Guangzhou
18:35 CST	Goulart 24'; Alan 28'	Report		Stadium: Tianhe Stadium; Attendance: 48,631; Referee: Huang Yejun

2 July 2016 15	Jiangsu Suning	4–3	Liaoning Whowin	Nanjing
18:35 CST	Shi Xiaotian 10' (o.g.); Ramires 25'; Jô 36'; Ji Xiang 70'	Report	Zhang Ye 30'; Thwaite 44'; Chamanga 46'	Stadium: Nanjing Olympic Sports Center; Attendance: 31,579; Referee: Shen Yinhao

9 July 2016 16	Shandong Luneng Taishan	2–1	Jiangsu Suning	Jinan
18:35 UTC+8	Montillo 57', 74'	Report	Jô 8'	Stadium: Jinan Olympic Sports Center Stadium; Attendance: 20,017; Referee: Zhang Long

16 July 2016 17	Yanbian Funde	3–0	Jiangsu Suning	Yanji
14:30 UTC+8	Kim Seung-dae 49'; Trawally 68'; Exmetjan Ekber 77'	Report		Stadium: Yanji Nationwide Fitness Centre Stadium; Attendance: 18,756; Referee: Gu Chunhan

20 July 2016 18	Jiangsu Suning	4–0	Hebei China Fortune	Nanjing
18:35 CST	Martínez 12', 57'; Wu Xi 23'; Sainsbury 70'	Report		Stadium: Nanjing Olympic Sports Center; Attendance: 36,523; Referee: Wang Zhe

24 July 2016 19	Jiangsu Suning	4–1	Henan Jianye	Nanjing
14:30 CST	Teixeira 50'; Hong Jeong-ho 62'; Martínez 68' (pen.); Ji Xiang 76'	Report	Zhong Jinbao 79'	Stadium: Nanjing Olympic Sports Center; Attendance: 35,172; Referee: Zhang Lei

30 July 2016 20	Shanghai Greenland Shenhua	3–2	Jiangsu Suning	Shanghai
18:35 UTC+8	Guarín 29' (pen.), 80'; Martins 59'	Report	Martínez 21', 42'	Stadium: Hongkou Football Stadium; Attendance: 23,969; Referee: Ma Li

15 June 2016 21	Jiangsu Suning	1–1	Guangzhou R&F	Nanjing
18:35 CST	Teixeira 79'	Report	Giannou 75'	Stadium: Nanjing Olympic Sports Center; Attendance: 28,923; Referee: Zhang Long

14 August 2016 22	Changchun Yatai Shenhua	1–2	Jiangsu Suning	Changchun
14:30 UTC+8	Moreno 62'	Report	Sainsbury 28'; Teixeira 43'	Stadium: Development Area Stadium; Attendance: 15,683; Referee: Li Haixin

20 August 2016 23	Jiangsu Suning	2–1	Beijing Guoan	Nanjing
18:35 CST	Martínez 45+3', 76'	Report	Yılmaz 10'	Stadium: Nanjing Olympic Sports Center; Attendance: 45,377; Referee: Lin Jun

11 September 2016 24	Shijiazhuang Ever Bright	1–6	Jiangsu Suning	Shijiazhuang
15:00 UTC+8	Drogbinha 48'	Report	Ji Xiang 30'; Teixeira 34' (pen.), 54', 90+3'; Martínez 85'; Jiang Jihong 90' (o.g.)	Stadium: Yutong International Sports Center; Attendance: 19,415; Referee: Fan Qi

17 September 2016 25	Jiangsu Suning	2–0	Tianjin Teda	Nanjing
18:35 CST	Xie Pengfei 13'; Teixeira 61'	Report		Stadium: Nanjing Olympic Sports Center; Attendance: 36,817; Referee: Gu Chunhan

25 September 2016 26	Hangzhou Greentown	3–0	Jiangsu Suning	Hangzhou
18:35 UTC+8	Anselmo Ramon 33', 49'; Cheng Mouyi 88'	Report		Stadium: Hangzhou Huanglong Stadium; Attendance: 11,018; Referee: Wang Jin

15 October 2016 27	Jiangsu Suning	2–1	Shanghai SIPG	Nanjing
18:35 CST	Teixeira 47'; Wu Xi 52'	Report	Hulk 64'	Stadium: Nanjing Olympic Sports Center; Attendance: 48,693; Referee: Wang Zhe

22 October 2016 28	Chongqing Lifan	2–2	Jiangsu Suning	Hangzhou
18:35 UTC+8	Wu Qing 48'; Alan Kardec 80'	Report	Martínez 19', 57'	Stadium: Hangzhou Huanglong Stadium; Attendance: 31,569; Referee: Zhao Zhizhi

30 October 2016 29	Jiangsu Suning	2–0	Guangzhou Evergrande Taobao	Nanjing
15:00 CST	Xie Pengfei 76'; Hong Jeong-ho 89'	Report		Stadium: Nanjing Olympic Sports Center; Attendance: 47,955; Referee: Huang Yejun

5 November 2016 30	Liaoning Whowin	1–0	Jiangsu Suning	Shenyang
15:00 UTC+8	Lukimya 70'	Report		Stadium: Shenyang Olympic Sports Center Stadium; Attendance: 22,739; Referee: Wang Zhe

==== Overall placement ====
Pos	Team	Pld	W	D	L	GF	GA	GD	Pts	Qualification or relegation
1	Guangzhou Evergrande Taobao (C)	30	19	7	4	62	19	+43	64	Qualification to Champions League group stage
2	Jiangsu Suning	30	17	6	7	53	33	+20	57	Qualification to Champions League group stage
3	Shanghai SIPG	30	14	10	6	56	32	+24	52	Qualification to Champions League play-off round
4	Shanghai Greenland Shenhua (Note: Shanghai Greenland Shenhua qualified for the 2017 AFC Champions League qualifying play-offs round as Guangzhou Evergrande Taobao and Jiangsu Suning are 2016 Chinese FA Cup finalists.)	30	12	12	6	46	31	+15	48	Qualification to Champions League play-off round
5	Beijing Guoan	30	11	10	9	34	26	+8	43	

Source: Sina Sports
Rules for classification: 1) Points; 2) Head-to-head points; 3) Head-to-head goal difference; 4) Head-to-head goals scored; 5) Reserve league points; 6) Goal difference; 7) Goals scored; 8) Disciplinary points (1 point for each yellow card, 3 points for each red card)
(C) Champions

==== Results summary ====
Overall								Home						Away					
Pld	W	D	L	GF	GA	GD	Pts	W	D	L	GF	GA	GD	W	D	L	GF	GA	GD
10	6	3	1	14	5	+9	21	4	1	0	9	1	+8	2	2	1	5	4	+1

Last updated: 21 May 2016.
Source: Competitive matches

=== Chinese FA Cup ===
11 May 2016 Third round	Wuhan Hongxing	0–3; Awarded (Note: Chinese Football Association awarded Jiangsu a 3–0 win as a result of the players and staff of Wuhan Hongxing attacked and injured the players of Jiangsu after the match, and Wuhan Hongxing used ineligible players to play in the match. The match originally ended 1–0 to Jiangsu.)	Jiangsu Suning	Wuhan
15:30 CST		Report	Ge Wei 90+7'	Stadium: Hankou Cultural Sports Centre; Attendance: 7,315; Referee: Kou Jianxun

28 June 2016 Fourth round	Shanghai Shenxin	0–3	Jiangsu Suning	Shanghai
19:35 CST		Report	Ramires 47'; Jô 87'; Wu Xi 89'	Stadium: Jinshan Sports Centre; Attendance: 4,632; Referee: Zhou Gang

13 July 2016 Fifth round, 1st leg	Henan Jianye	2–1	Jiangsu Suning	Zhengzhou
19:35 CST	Patiño 41'; Ivo 54'	Report	Teixeira 82' (pen.)	Stadium: Zhengzhou Hanghai Stadium; Attendance: 13,133; Referee: Wang Zhe

27 July 2016 Fifth round, 2nd leg	Jiangsu Suning	3–1 (a.e.t.) (4–3 agg.)	Henan Jianye	Changzhou
19:35 CST	Teixeira 13', 69'; Ji Xiang 109'	Report	Ivo 50'	Stadium: Changzhou Olympic Sports Center; Attendance: 30,706; Referee: Lin Jun

17 August 2016 Semi-final, 1st leg	Shanghai Greenland Shenhua	2–3	Jiangsu Suning	Shanghai
19:35 CST	Martins 21', 90+3'	Report	Teixeira 54', 80'; Wu Xi 55'	Stadium: Hongkou Football Stadium; Attendance: 23,848; Referee: Huang Yejun

21 September 2016 Semi-final, 2nd leg	Jiangsu Suning	1–0 (4–2 agg.)	Shanghai Greenland Shenhua	Nanjing
19:35 CST	Wu Xi 76'	Report		Stadium: Nanjing Olympic Sports Centre; Attendance: 45,729; Referee: Zhou Gang

20 November 2016 Final, 1st leg	Guangzhou Evergrande Taobao	1–1	Jiangsu Suning	Guangzhou
19:35 CST	Goulart 9'	Report	Teixeira 64'	Stadium: Tianhe Stadium; Attendance: 48,562; Referee: Huang Yejun

27 November 2016 Final, 2nd leg	Jiangsu Suning	2–2 (3–3 agg.)	Guangzhou Evergrande Taobao	Nanjing
19:00 CST	Martínez 7', 73'	Report	Paulinho 45+2'; Huang Bowen 81'	Stadium: Nanjing Olympic Sports Centre; Attendance: 58,331; Referee: Jansen Foo (Singapore)

=== AFC Champions League ===
For winning the Chinese FA Cup in the previous year, Jiangsu Suning have qualified for the Group Stage of the 2016 AFC Champions League. Jiangsu Suning were drawn in Group E with Korea's Jeonbuk Hyundai Motors, Japan team FC Tokyo, and Becamex Bình Dương from Vietnam. They were eliminated after a draw kept them with nine points, just one point below Jeonbuk Hyundai Motors and FC Tokyo.

==== Group stage ====
Pos	Team	Pld	W	D	L	GF	GA	GD	Pts	Qualification	JHM	TOK	JIA	BBD
1	(South Korea) Jeonbuk Hyundai Motors	6	3	1	2	13	9	+4	10	Advance to knockout stage	—	2–1	2–2	2–0
2	(Japan) FC Tokyo	6	3	1	2	8	8	0	10	Advance to knockout stage	0–3	—	0–0	3–1
3	(China) Jiangsu Suning	6	2	3	1	10	7	+3	9		3–2	1–2	—	3–0
4	(Vietnam) Becamex Binh Duong	6	1	1	4	6	13	−7	4		3–2	1–2	1–1	—

Source: AFC
Rules for classification: Group stage tiebreakers

Win Draw Loss Upcoming fixture

23 February 2016	Becamex Bình Dương (Vietnam)	1–1	(China) Jiangsu Suning	Gò Đậu Stadium, Thủ Dầu Một
17:00 UTC+7	Nguyễn Anh Đức 28' (pen.)	Report	Ji Xiang 13'	Attendance: 11,800; Referee: Alireza Faghani (Iran)

1 March 2016	Jiangsu Suning (China)	3–2	(South Korea) Jeonbuk Hyundai Motors	Nanjing Olympic Sports Centre, Nanjing
20:00 UTC+8	Teixeira 16'; Jô 65'; Wu Xi 69'	Report	Lee Dong-gook 62'; Sainsbury 86' (o.g.)	Attendance: 34,175; Referee: Ravshan Irmatov (Uzbekistan)

15 March 2016	FC Tokyo (Japan)	0–0	(China) Jiangsu Suning	Ajinomoto Stadium, Tokyo
19:30 UTC+9		Report		Attendance: 10,265; Referee: Abdulrahman Al-Jassim (Qatar)

6 April 2016	Jiangsu Suning (China)	1–2	(Japan) FC Tokyo	Nanjing Olympic Sports Centre, Nanjing
20:00 UTC+8	Jô 34' (pen.)	Report	Morishige 30', 83'	Attendance: 45,065; Referee: Ben Williams (Australia)

20 April 2016	Jiangsu Suning (China)	3–0	(Vietnam) Becamex Bình Dương	Nanjing Olympic Sports Centre, Nanjing
20:00 UTC+8	Wu Xi 6'; Jô 8'; Ji Xiang 81'	Report		Attendance: 33,430; Referee: Ali Sabah (Iraq)

4 May 2016	Jeonbuk Hyundai Motors (South Korea)	2–2	(China) Jiangsu Suning	Jeonju World Cup Stadium, Jeonju
19:00 UTC+9	Leonardo 19'; Lim Jong-eun 69'	Report	Teixeira 24'; Jô 54'	Attendance: 17,312; Referee: Ahmed Al-Kaf (Oman)
