= 2013 Chinese FA Super Cup =

Guangzhou Evergrande	Jiangsu Sainty
1	2
- Date: 3 March 2013
- Venue: Tianhe Stadium, Guangzhou
- Man of the Match: (Belarus) Sergey Krivets
- Referee: Tan Hai (Beijing)
- Attendance: 14,817
- Weather: Overcast

The 2013 Chinese FA Super Cup (Chinese: 2013中国足球协会超级杯) was the 11th Chinese FA Super Cup. The match was played at the Tianhe Stadium on 3 March 2013, contesting by Super League and FA Cup double winners Guangzhou Evergrande and Super League runners-up Jiangsu Sainty.

Jiangsu Sainty defeated Guangzhou Evergrande 2–1, thus winning their first ever Chinese FA Super Cup title.

== Match ==
=== Details ===
3 March 2013
15:30 UTC+8

Guangzhou Evergrande	1 – 2	Jiangsu Sainty
Conca 72' (pen.)		Zhang Linpeng 18' (o.g.); Krivets 27'

Tianhe Stadium, Guangzhou
Attendance: 14,817
Referee: Tan Hai (Beijing)

Guangzhou Evergrande	Jiangsu Sainty

GK	1	(China) Zeng Cheng
RB	5	(China) Zhang Linpeng
CB	6	(China) Feng Xiaoting
CB	28	(South Korea) Kim Young-Gwon
LB	32	(China) Sun Xiang
DM	16	(China) Huang Bowen		(substituted off) 38'
DM	10	(China) Zheng Zhi (c)
AM	15	(Argentina) Darío Conca
RW	29	(China) Gao Lin		(substituted off) 56'
LW	11	(Brazil) Muriqui
CF	9	(Brazil) Elkeson		(substituted off) 56'
Substitutes:
GK	22	(China) Li Shuai
DF	4	(China) Zhao Peng
DF	33	(China) Rong Hao
MF	7	(China) Feng Junyan
MF	14	(China) Feng Renliang		(substituted on) 56'
MF	24	(China) Shi Hongjun
MF	25	(China) Peng Xinli
MF	37	(China) Zhao Xuri	(yellow card) 65'	(substituted on) 38'
FW	18	(Paraguay) Lucas Barrios		(substituted on) 56'
Manager:
(Italy) Marcello Lippi

GK	26	(China) Guan Zhen	(yellow card) 84'
RB	5	(China) Zhou Yun	(yellow card) 36'
CB	39	(Uzbekistan) Kamoliddin Tajiev
CB	12	(China) Ai Zhibo (c)	(yellow card) 71'
LB	23	(China) Ren Hang
RM	7	(China) Bari Mamatil		(substituted off) 60'
CM	22	(China) Wu Xi
CM	8	(China) Liu Jianye	(yellow card) 77'	(substituted off) 82'
LM	24	(China) Ji Xiang
SS	21	(Belarus) Sergey Krivets
ST	11	(Albania) Hamdi Salihi	(yellow card) 50'	(substituted off) 73'
Substitutes:
GK	1	(China) Deng Xiaofei
DF	4	(China) Xu Youzhi
DF	6	(China) Jiang Jiajun		(substituted on) 82'
DF	28	(China) Yang Xiaotian
MF	18	(China) Li Chi
MF	30	(China) Yin Lu
FW	15	(China) Ge Wei
FW	17	(China) Qu Cheng		(substituted on) 73'
FW	20	(China) Sun Ke	(yellow card) 64'	(substituted on) 60'
Manager:
(Serbia) Dragan Okuka

Man of the Match:
(Belarus) Sergey Krivets (Jiangsu Sainty)

Assistant referees:
Huo Weiming (Beijing)
Liu Guiqing (Beijing)
Fourth official:
Yao Qing (Shandong)

Chinese FA Super Cup
2013 Winners
Jiangsu Sainty
First title
