= Xu Youzhi =

Chinese footballer

Xu Youzhi 许有志
Personal information
- Date of birth: 13 December 1987 (age 38)
- Place of birth: Qingdao, Shandong, China
- Height: 1.90 m (6 ft 3 in)
- Position: Defender

Team information
- Current team: Nanjing Balanta

Senior career*
Years	Team	Apps	(Gls)
2008–2011	Chongqing Lifan	28	(0)
2012–2018	Jiangsu Sainty	13	(0)
2019–	Nanjing Balanta	0	(0)
- * Club domestic league appearances and goals as of 1 November 2016

Xu Youzhi (Chinese: 许有志; pinyin: Xǔ Yǒuzhì; born 13 December 1987) is a Chinese football player who currently plays for Nanjing Balanta in the Chinese Champions League.

== Club career ==
Xu started his professional football career with Chongqing Lifan in 2008. On 3 April, he made his Super League debut in the third round of the season which Chongqing Lifan lost to Tianjin Teda 2–0, coming on as a substitute for Liu Jialin in the 91st minute. After Dutch manager Arie Haan took over the club, Xu became the regular player of the team in June. He made 22 appearances in the 2009 league season, however, Chongqing finished the last place of the league and relegated to China League One. In February 2010, the club were allowed to stay within the 2010 Chinese Super League after it was discovered that two Super League clubs Chengdu Blades and Guangzhou F.C. were guilty of match-fixing. Xu lost his position and didn't play for the club in 2010 as Chongqing stayed in the relegation zone at the end of the season. In July 2011, Xu made a brief trial with Belgian Second Division side K.S.K. Heist but could not stay due to the disagreement of transfer fee. He made 8 appearances in the 2011 China League One.

On 16 January 2012, Chinese Super League side Jiangsu Sainty announced that they had signed Xu with an undisclosed fee. He made his debut for Jiangsu on 8 July, in a 2–2 home draw against Shanghai Shenhua, coming on as a substitute for Jiang Jiajun in the 79th minute. He made just 4 appearances (103 minutes in total) in the 2012 league season as the club achieved runners-up in the league and gained the entry into their first AFC Champions League. He was sent to the reserved team in 2017 and 2018.

== Career statistics ==
Statistics accurate as of 1 November 2016

Club performance			League		Cup		Continental		Other		Total	
Season	Club	League	Apps	Goals	Apps	Goals	Apps	Goals	Apps	Goals	Apps	Goals
China PR			League		FA Cup		Asia		Others		Total	
2008	Chongqing Lifan	China League One	0	0	-		-		-		0	0
2009	Chongqing Lifan	Chinese Super League	20	0	-		-		-		20	0
2010	Chongqing Lifan	Chinese Super League	0	0	-		-		-		0	0
2011	Chongqing Lifan	China League One	8	0	2	0	-		-		10	0
2012	Jiangsu Sainty	Chinese Super League	3	0	1	0	-		-		4	0
2013	Jiangsu Sainty	Chinese Super League	5	0	0	0	0	0	0	0	5	0
2014	Jiangsu Sainty	Chinese Super League	0	0	0	0	-		-		0	0
2015	Jiangsu Sainty	Chinese Super League	4	0	1	0	-		-		5	0
2016	Jiangsu Sainty	Chinese Super League	1	0	2	0	0	0	0	0	3	0
Total	China PR		41	0	6	0	0	0	0	0	47	0

== Honours ==
=== Club ===
Jiangsu Sainty

- Chinese FA Cup: 2015
- Chinese FA Super Cup: 2013
