= 2015 EAFF East Asian Cup Final squads =

Below are the squads for the 2015 EAFF East Asian Cup tournament, held in China PR. There were 23 players in each squad, including 3 goalkeepers.

== China ==
Coach: (France) Alain Perrin

No.	Pos.	Player	Date of birth (age)	Caps	Goals	Club
1	GK	Zeng Cheng	8 January 1987 (aged 28)	30	0	(Chinese Football Association) Guangzhou Evergrande
12	GK	Yan Junling	28 January 1991 (aged 24)	2	0	(Chinese Football Association) Shanghai SIPG
23	GK	Wang Dalei	10 January 1989 (aged 26)	15	0	(Chinese Football Association) Shandong Luneng
2	DF	Ren Hang	23 February 1989 (aged 26)	15	0	(Chinese Football Association) Jiangsu Sainty
3	DF	Lei Tenglong	17 January 1991 (aged 24)	0	0	(Chinese Football Association) Beijing Guoan
4	DF	Wang Tong	12 February 1993 (aged 22)	0	0	(Chinese Football Association) Shandong Luneng
5	DF	Yu Yang	6 August 1989 (aged 25)	7	0	(Chinese Football Association) Guangzhou R&F
6	DF	Feng Xiaoting	22 October 1985 (aged 29)	45	0	(Chinese Football Association) Guangzhou Evergrande
13	DF	Liu Jianye	17 June 1987 (aged 28)	41	0	(Chinese Football Association) Jiangsu Sainty
14	DF	Ji Xiang	1 March 1990 (aged 25)	5	0	(Chinese Football Association) Jiangsu Sainty
17	DF	Rao Weihui	25 March 1989 (aged 26)	1	0	(Chinese Football Association) Guizhou Renhe
7	MF	Wu Lei	19 November 1991 (aged 23)	27	5	(Chinese Football Association) Shanghai SIPG
8	MF	Cai Huikang	10 October 1989 (aged 25)	12	0	(Chinese Football Association) Shanghai SIPG
10	MF	Zheng Zhi (captain)	20 August 1980 (aged 34)	85	15	(Chinese Football Association) Guangzhou Evergrande
11	MF	Wang Yongpo	19 January 1987 (aged 28)	8	4	(Chinese Football Association) Shandong Luneng
15	MF	Wu Xi	19 February 1989 (aged 26)	26	2	(Chinese Football Association) Jiangsu Sainty
16	MF	Sun Ke	26 August 1989 (aged 25)	26	7	(Chinese Football Association) Jiangsu Sainty
19	MF	Liu Binbin	16 June 1993 (aged 22)	3	0	(Chinese Football Association) Shandong Luneng
20	MF	Zhang Chiming	7 January 1989 (aged 26)	2	0	(Chinese Football Association) Beijing Guoan
21	MF	Yu Hai	4 June 1987 (aged 28)	55	10	(Chinese Football Association) Shanghai SIPG
9	FW	Yang Xu	12 February 1987 (aged 28)	37	17	(Chinese Football Association) Shandong Luneng
18	FW	Gao Lin	14 February 1986 (aged 29)	83	18	(Chinese Football Association) Guangzhou Evergrande
22	FW	Yu Dabao	18 April 1988 (aged 27)	27	9	(Chinese Football Association) Beijing Guoan

== Japan ==
Coach: (Bosnia and Herzegovina) Vahid Halilhodžić

No.	Pos.	Player	Date of birth (age)	Caps	Goals	Club
1	GK	Masaaki Higashiguchi	12 May 1986 (aged 29)	0	0	(Japan Football Association) Gamba Osaka
12	GK	Shūsaku Nishikawa	18 June 1986 (aged 29)	15	0	(Japan Football Association) Urawa Red Diamonds
23	GK	Yūji Rokutan	10 April 1987 (aged 28)	0	0	(Japan Football Association) Vegalta Sendai
3	DF	Kōsuke Ōta	23 July 1987 (aged 28)	5	0	(Japan Football Association) FC Tokyo
4	DF	Hiroki Mizumoto	12 September 1985 (aged 29)	6	0	(Japan Football Association) Sanfrecce Hiroshima
5	DF	Tomoaki Makino	11 May 1987 (aged 28)	17	2	(Japan Football Association) Urawa Red Diamonds
6	DF	Masato Morishige (captain)	21 May 1987 (aged 28)	23	1	(Japan Football Association) FC Tokyo
14	DF	Hiroki Fujiharu	28 November 1988 (aged 26)	1	0	(Japan Football Association) Gamba Osaka
15	DF	Daiki Niwa	16 January 1986 (aged 29)	0	0	(Japan Football Association) Gamba Osaka
21	DF	Wataru Endo	9 February 1993 (aged 22)	0	0	(Japan Football Association) Shonan Bellmare
22	DF	Koki Yonekura	17 May 1988 (aged 27)	0	0	(Japan Football Association) Gamba Osaka
2	MF	Shōgo Taniguchi	15 July 1991 (aged 24)	1	0	(Japan Football Association) Kawasaki Frontale
7	MF	Gaku Shibasaki	28 May 1992 (aged 23)	8	3	(Japan Football Association) Kashima Antlers
8	MF	Naoyuki Fujita	22 June 1987 (aged 28)	0	0	(Japan Football Association) Sagan Tosu
16	MF	Hotaru Yamaguchi	6 October 1990 (aged 24)	17	0	(Japan Football Association) Cerezo Osaka
17	MF	Takuji Yonemoto	3 December 1990 (aged 24)	2	0	(Japan Football Association) FC Tokyo
18	MF	Yūki Mutō	7 November 1988 (aged 26)	0	0	(Japan Football Association) Urawa Red Diamonds
9	FW	Kensuke Nagai	5 March 1989 (aged 26)	3	0	(Japan Football Association) Nagoya Grampus
10	FW	Shinzō Kōroki	31 July 1986 (aged 29)	12	0	(Japan Football Association) Urawa Red Diamonds
11	FW	Takashi Usami	6 May 1992 (aged 23)	4	1	(Japan Football Association) Gamba Osaka
13	FW	Shū Kurata	26 November 1988 (aged 26)	0	0	(Japan Football Association) Gamba Osaka
19	FW	Takuma Asano	10 November 1994 (aged 20)	0	0	(Japan Football Association) Sanfrecce Hiroshima
20	FW	Kengo Kawamata	14 October 1989 (aged 25)	2	1	(Japan Football Association) Nagoya Grampus

== North Korea ==
Coach: (North Korea) Kim Chang-bok

No.	Pos.	Player	Date of birth (age)	Caps	Goals	Club
1	GK	Ri Myong-guk	9 September 1986 (aged 28)	68	0	(DPR Korea Football Association) Pyongyang City
18	GK	Ri Kwang-il	13 April 1988 (aged 27)	3	0	(DPR Korea Football Association) April 25
21	GK	Kim Il-gwang	27 February 1992 (aged 23)	0	0	(DPR Korea Football Association) Kigwancha
2	DF	Jang Song-hyok	18 January 1991 (aged 24)	20	4	(DPR Korea Football Association) Rimyongsu
3	DF	Jang Kuk-chol	16 February 1994 (aged 21)	15	3	(DPR Korea Football Association) Hwaebul
5	DF	Han Song-hyok	11 December 1987 (aged 27)	2	0	(DPR Korea Football Association) Hwaebul
6	DF	Kang Kuk-chol	1 July 1990 (aged 25)	13	0	(DPR Korea Football Association) Pyongyang City
12	DF	Jon Kwang-ik	5 April 1988 (aged 27)	44	2	(DPR Korea Football Association) Amrokgang
13	DF	Sim Hyon-jin	1 January 1991 (aged 24)	10	0	(DPR Korea Football Association) Sobaeksu
15	DF	Ri Yong-chol	18 January 1991 (aged 24)	7	0	(DPR Korea Football Association) Kyonggongop
4	MF	Ri Sang-chol	26 December 1990 (aged 24)	5	2	(DPR Korea Football Association) Amrokgang
11	MF	Jong Il-gwan	30 October 1992 (aged 22)	31	6	(DPR Korea Football Association) Rimyongsu
14	MF	So Kyong-jin	8 January 1994 (aged 21)	5	0	(DPR Korea Football Association) Sobaeksu
16	MF	Ro Hak-su	19 January 1990 (aged 25)	18	3	(DPR Korea Football Association) Rimyongsu
17	MF	So Hyon-uk	17 April 1992 (aged 23)	10	1	(DPR Korea Football Association) April 25
22	MF	Ri Yong-jik	8 February 1991 (aged 24)	4	0	(Japan Football Association) V-Varen Nagasaki
23	MF	Ri Chol-myong	18 February 1988 (aged 27)	39	7	(DPR Korea Football Association) Pyongyang City
7	FW	Ri Hyok-chol	27 January 1991 (aged 24)	10	4	(DPR Korea Football Association) Rimyongsu
8	FW	Kim Yong-gwang	18 September 1992 (aged 22)	0	0	(DPR Korea Football Association) Hwaebul
9	FW	Pak Kwang-ryong	27 September 1992 (aged 22)	18	4	(Swiss Football Association) FC Biel-Bienne
10	FW	An Byong-jun	22 May 1990 (aged 25)	4	0	(Japan Football Association) Kawasaki Frontale
19	FW	Hong Kum-song	3 June 1990 (aged 25)	8	1	(DPR Korea Football Association) April 25
20	FW	Pak Hyon-il	21 September 1993 (aged 21)	2	0	(DPR Korea Football Association) Amrokgang

== South Korea ==
Coach: (Germany) Uli Stielike

No.	Pos.	Player	Date of birth (age)	Caps	Goals	Club
1	GK	Kim Seung-gyu	30 September 1990 (aged 24)	12	0	(Korea Football Association) Ulsan Hyundai
21	GK	Gu Sung-yun	27 June 1994 (aged 21)	0	0	(Japan Football Association) Hokkaido Consadole Sapporo
23	GK	Lee Bum-young	2 April 1989 (aged 26)	1	0	(Korea Football Association) Busan IPark
2	DF	Jeong Dong-ho	7 March 1990 (aged 25)	3	0	(Korea Football Association) Ulsan Hyundai
3	DF	Hong Chul	17 September 1990 (aged 24)	5	0	(Korea Football Association) Suwon Samsung Bluewings
4	DF	Kim Ju-young	9 July 1988 (aged 27)	8	0	(Chinese Football Association) Shanghai SIPG
5	DF	Kim Kee-hee	13 July 1989 (aged 26)	9	0	(Korea Football Association) Jeonbuk Hyundai Motors
13	DF	Lee Ju-yong	26 September 1992 (aged 22)	1	0	(Korea Football Association) Jeonbuk Hyundai Motors
14	DF	Kim Min-hyeok	27 February 1992 (aged 23)	0	0	(Japan Football Association) Sagan Tosu
15	DF	Rim Chang-woo	13 February 1992 (aged 23)	0	0	(Korea Football Association) Ulsan Hyundai
19	DF	Kim Young-gwon (captain)	27 February 1990 (aged 25)	35	2	(Chinese Football Association) Guangzhou Evergrande
6	MF	Jung Woo-young	14 December 1989 (aged 25)	2	0	(Japan Football Association) Vissel Kobe
7	MF	Kim Min-woo	25 February 1990 (aged 25)	11	1	(Japan Football Association) Sagan Tosu
8	MF	Ju Se-jong	30 October 1990 (aged 24)	1	0	(Korea Football Association) Busan IPark
10	MF	Lee Jong-ho	24 February 1992 (aged 23)	0	0	(Korea Football Association) Jeonnam Dragons
11	MF	Lee Yong-jae	8 June 1991 (aged 24)	2	1	(Japan Football Association) V-Varen Nagasaki
12	MF	Kim Seung-dae	1 April 1991 (aged 24)	0	0	(Korea Football Association) Pohang Steelers
16	MF	Lee Chan-dong	10 January 1993 (aged 22)	0	0	(Korea Football Association) Gwangju FC
17	MF	Lee Jae-sung	10 August 1992 (aged 22)	4	2	(Korea Football Association) Jeonbuk Hyundai Motors
20	MF	Jang Hyun-soo	28 September 1991 (aged 23)	16	0	(Chinese Football Association) Guangzhou R&F
22	MF	Kwon Chang-hoon	30 June 1994 (aged 21)	0	0	(Korea Football Association) Suwon Samsung Bluewings
9	FW	Kim Shin-wook	14 April 1988 (aged 27)	29	3	(Korea Football Association) Ulsan Hyundai
18	FW	Lee Jeong-hyeop	24 June 1991 (aged 24)	11	4	(Korea Football Association) Sangju Sangmu
