= 2013 EAFF East Asian Cup Final squads =

Below are the squads for the 2013 EAFF East Asian Cup tournament, held in Korea Republic. There were 23 players in each squad, including 3 goalkeepers.

== Australia ==
Head coach: (Germany) Holger Osieck

No.	Pos.	Player	Date of birth (age)	Caps	Goals	Club
1	GK	Eugene Galeković	12 June 1981 (aged 32)	6	0	(Football Australia) Adelaide United
12	GK	Mark Birighitti	17 April 1991 (aged 22)	0	0	(Football Australia) Newcastle Jets
18	GK	Nathan Coe	1 June 1984 (aged 29)	3	0	(Football Australia) Melbourne Victory
3	DF	Michael Thwaite	2 May 1983 (aged 30)	11	0	(Football Australia) Perth Glory
4	DF	Ryan McGowan	15 August 1989 (aged 23)	3	0	(Chinese Football Association) Shandong Luneng Taishan
6	DF	Robert Cornthwaite	24 October 1985 (aged 27)	7	3	(Korea Football Association) Chunnam Dragons
11	DF	Craig Goodwin	16 December 1991 (aged 21)	0	0	(Football Australia) Newcastle Jets
13	DF	Jade North	7 January 1982 (aged 31)	39	0	(Football Australia) Brisbane Roar
15	DF	Trent Sainsbury	5 January 1992 (aged 21)	0	0	(Football Australia) Central Coast Mariners
22	DF	Ivan Franjić	10 September 1987 (aged 25)	3	0	(Football Australia) Brisbane Roar
5	MF	Mark Milligan (captain)	4 August 1985 (aged 27)	22	2	(Football Australia) Melbourne Victory
10	MF	Dario Vidošić	8 April 1987 (aged 26)	16	1	(Football Australia) Adelaide United
16	MF	Ruben Zadkovich	23 May 1986 (aged 27)	1	0	(Football Australia) Newcastle Jets
17	MF	Matt McKay	11 January 1983 (aged 30)	38	1	(Chinese Football Association) Changchun Yatai
20	MF	Aaron Mooy	15 September 1990 (aged 22)	2	2	(Football Australia) Western Sydney Wanderers
23	MF	Joshua Brillante	March 25, 1993 (aged 20)	0	0	(Football Australia) Newcastle Jets
24	MF	Erik Paartalu	3 May 1986 (aged 27)	0	0	(Chinese Football Association) Tianjin Teda
25	MF	Mitch Nichols	1 May 1989 (aged 24)	1	0	(Football Australia) Melbourne Victory
7	FW	Archie Thompson	23 October 1978 (aged 34)	50	28	(Football Australia) Melbourne Victory
19	FW	Mitchell Duke	18 January 1991 (aged 22)	0	0	(Football Australia) Central Coast Mariners
21	FW	Adam Taggart	June 2, 1993 (aged 20)	3	2	(Football Australia) Newcastle Jets
26	FW	Connor Pain	11 November 1993 (aged 19)	0	0	(Football Australia) Melbourne Victory
29	FW	Tomi Juric	22 July 1991 (aged 21)	0	0	(Football Australia) Western Sydney Wanderers

== China ==
Head coach: (China) Fu Bo (caretaker)

No.	Pos.	Player	Date of birth (age)	Caps	Goals	Club
1	GK	Zeng Cheng	8 January 1987 (aged 26)	20	0	(Chinese Football Association) Guangzhou Evergrande
12	GK	Geng Xiaofeng	15 October 1987 (aged 25)	3	0	(Chinese Football Association) Shandong Luneng Taishan
23	GK	Yang Zhi	15 January 1983 (aged 30)	34	0	(Chinese Football Association) Beijing Guoan
2	DF	Li Xuepeng	18 September 1988 (aged 24)	11	0	(Chinese Football Association) Dalian Aerbin
3	DF	Sun Xiang	15 January 1982 (aged 31)	66	5	(Chinese Football Association) Guangzhou Evergrande
4	DF	Rong Hao	7 April 1987 (aged 26)	36	0	(Chinese Football Association) Guangzhou Evergrande
5	DF	Du Wei	9 February 1982 (aged 31)	64	4	(Chinese Football Association) Shandong Luneng Taishan
6	DF	Shi Ke	8 January 1993 (aged 20)	0	0	(Chinese Football Association) Hangzhou Greentown
13	DF	Liu Jianye	17 June 1987 (aged 26)	34	0	(Chinese Football Association) Jiangsu Sainty
15	DF	Wu Xi	19 February 1989 (aged 24)	5	0	(Chinese Football Association) Jiangsu Sainty
17	DF	Zhang Linpeng	9 May 1989 (aged 24)	26	4	(Chinese Football Association) Guangzhou Evergrande
7	MF	Cui Peng	31 May 1987 (aged 26)	6	0	(Chinese Football Association) Shandong Luneng Taishan
8	MF	Wang Yongpo	19 January 1987 (aged 26)	3	2	(Chinese Football Association) Shandong Luneng Taishan
10	MF	Zheng Zhi (captain)	20 August 1980 (aged 32)	69	13	(Chinese Football Association) Guangzhou Evergrande
16	MF	Huang Bowen	13 July 1987 (aged 26)	24	2	(Chinese Football Association) Guangzhou Evergrande
19	MF	Yang Hao	19 August 1983 (aged 29)	31	2	(Chinese Football Association) Guizhou Renhe
20	MF	Wu Lei	19 November 1991 (aged 21)	4	0	(Chinese Football Association) Shanghai East Asia
21	MF	Zhang Xizhe	23 January 1991 (aged 22)	1	0	(Chinese Football Association) Beijing Guoan
9	FW	Yang Xu	12 February 1987 (aged 26)	25	9	(Chinese Football Association) Shandong Luneng Taishan
11	FW	Qu Bo	15 July 1981 (aged 32)	73	18	(Chinese Football Association) Guizhou Renhe
14	FW	Sun Ke	26 August 1989 (aged 23)	4	0	(Chinese Football Association) Jiangsu Sainty
18	FW	Gao Lin	14 February 1986 (aged 27)	65	16	(Chinese Football Association) Guangzhou Evergrande
22	FW	Yu Dabao	18 April 1988 (aged 25)	15	2	(Chinese Football Association) Dalian Aerbin

== Japan ==
Manager: (Italy) Alberto Zaccheroni

No.	Pos.	Player	Date of birth (age)	Caps	Goals	Club
1	GK	Takuto Hayashi	9 August 1982 (aged 30)	0	0	(Japan Football Association) Vegalta Sendai
12	GK	Shūsaku Nishikawa	18 June 1986 (aged 27)	8	0	(Japan Football Association) Sanfrecce Hiroshima
23	GK	Shūichi Gonda	3 March 1989 (aged 24)	1	0	(Japan Football Association) FC Tokyo
3	DF	Yūichi Komano (captain)	25 July 1981 (aged 31)	75	1	(Japan Football Association) Júbilo Iwata
4	DF	Ryota Moriwaki	6 April 1986 (aged 27)	2	0	(Japan Football Association) Urawa Red Diamonds
5	DF	Tomoaki Makino	11 May 1987 (aged 26)	11	1	(Japan Football Association) Urawa Red Diamonds
6	DF	Yuhei Tokunaga (Note: Replaced Gaku Shibasaki.)	25 September 1983 (aged 29)	7	0	(Japan Football Association) FC Tokyo
16	DF	Yūzō Kurihara	18 September 1983 (aged 29)	17	2	(Japan Football Association) Yokohama F. Marinos
26	DF	Daisuke Suzuki	29 January 1990 (aged 23)	0	0	(Japan Football Association) Kashiwa Reysol
35	DF	Kazuhiko Chiba	21 June 1985 (aged 28)	0	0	(Japan Football Association) Sanfrecce Hiroshima
36	DF	Masato Morishige	21 May 1987 (aged 26)	0	0	(Japan Football Association) FC Tokyo
17	MF	Hotaru Yamaguchi	6 October 1990 (aged 22)	0	0	(Japan Football Association) Cerezo Osaka
20	MF	Hideto Takahashi	17 October 1987 (aged 25)	5	0	(Japan Football Association) FC Tokyo
28	MF	Toshihiro Aoyama	22 February 1986 (aged 27)	0	0	(Japan Football Association) Sanfrecce Hiroshima
29	MF	Yōjiro Takahagi	2 August 1986 (aged 26)	0	0	(Japan Football Association) Sanfrecce Hiroshima
31	MF	Takahiro Ogihara	5 October 1991 (aged 21)	0	0	(Japan Football Association) Cerezo Osaka
9	FW	Masato Kudo	6 May 1990 (aged 23)	0	0	(Japan Football Association) Kashiwa Reysol
11	FW	Genki Haraguchi	9 May 1991 (aged 22)	1	0	(Japan Football Association) Urawa Red Diamonds
14	FW	Hiroki Yamada	27 December 1988 (aged 24)	0	0	(Japan Football Association) Júbilo Iwata
21	FW	Yūya Ōsako	18 May 1990 (aged 23)	0	0	(Japan Football Association) Kashima Antlers
30	FW	Yōichirō Kakitani	3 January 1990 (aged 23)	0	0	(Japan Football Association) Cerezo Osaka
32	FW	Manabu Saitō	4 April 1990 (aged 23)	0	0	(Japan Football Association) Yokohama F. Marinos
33	FW	Yōhei Toyoda	11 April 1985 (aged 28)	0	0	(Japan Football Association) Sagan Tosu

== South Korea ==
Manager: (South Korea) Hong Myung-bo

No.	Pos.	Player	Date of birth (age)	Caps	Goals	Club
1	GK	Jung Sung-ryong	4 January 1985 (aged 28)	50	0	(Korea Football Association) Suwon Samsung Bluewings
21	GK	Lee Bum-young	2 April 1989 (aged 24)	0	0	(Korea Football Association) Busan IPark
6	DF	Hong Jeong-ho	12 August 1989 (aged 23)	14	0	(Korea Football Association) Jeju United
4	DF	Kim Young-gwon	27 February 1990 (aged 23)	10	1	(Chinese Football Association) Guangzhou Evergrande
2	DF	Kim Chang-soo	12 September 1985 (aged 27)	5	0	(Japan Football Association) Kashiwa Reysol
20	DF	Hwang Seok-ho	27 June 1989 (aged 24)	1	0	(Japan Football Association) Sanfrecce Hiroshima
24	DF	Jang Hyun-soo	28 March 1991 (aged 22)	1	0	(Japan Football Association) FC Tokyo
33	DF	Kim Jin-su	13 June 1992 (aged 21)	0	0	(Japan Football Association) Albirex Niigata
14	DF	Kim Min-woo	25 February 1990 (aged 23)	0	0	(Japan Football Association) Sagan Tosu
29	DF	Lee Yong	24 December 1986 (aged 26)	0	0	(Korea Football Association) Ulsan Hyundai
19	MF	Yeom Ki-hun (captain)	30 March 1983 (aged 30)	46	3	(Korea Football Association) Police
10	MF	Ha Dae-sung	2 March 1985 (aged 28)	7	0	(Korea Football Association) FC Seoul
26	MF	Lee Seung-gi	2 June 1988 (aged 25)	5	0	(Korea Football Association) Jeonbuk Hyundai Motors
7	MF	Cho Young-cheol	31 May 1989 (aged 24)	3	0	(Japan Football Association) Omiya Ardija
22	MF	Go Yo-han	10 March 1988 (aged 25)	3	0	(Korea Football Association) FC Seoul
15	MF	Park Jong-woo	10 March 1989 (aged 24)	3	0	(Korea Football Association) Busan IPark
16	MF	Lee Myung-joo	24 April 1990 (aged 23)	2	0	(Korea Football Association) Pohang Steelers
13	MF	Han Kook-young	19 April 1990 (aged 23)	1	0	(Japan Football Association) Shonan Bellmare
34	MF	Ko Moo-yeol	5 September 1990 (aged 22)	0	0	(Korea Football Association) Pohang Steelers
23	MF	Yun Il-lok	27 March 1992 (aged 21)	0	0	(Korea Football Association) FC Seoul
17	FW	Kim Shin-wook	14 April 1988 (aged 25)	16	1	(Korea Football Association) Ulsan Hyundai
9	FW	Seo Dong-hyeon	5 June 1985 (aged 28)	4	0	(Korea Football Association) Jeju United
38	FW	Kim Dong-sub	29 March 1989 (aged 24)	0	0	(Korea Football Association) Seongnam Ilhwa Chunma

== Player statistics ==
Player representation by club

Players	Clubs
8	(China) Guangzhou Evergrande
6	(China) Shandong Luneng Taishan
5	(Australia) Melbourne Victory, (Australia) Newcastle Jets, (Japan) FC Tokyo, (Japan) Sanfrecce Hiroshima

Player representation by club league

Players	Percentage	Nations
30	32.6%	(Japan) J.League Division 1
27	29.3%	(China) Chinese Super League
19	20.7%	(Australia) A-League
15	16.3%	(South Korea) K League Classic
1	1.1%	(South Korea) K League Challenge

Average age of squads

Average age	Nations
25.2	Australia
26.2	China
25.5	Japan
24.5	South Korea

Players with most international appearance

Caps	Player	Nation	Club
75	Yūichi Komano	Japan	(Japan) Júbilo Iwata
73	Qu Bo	China	(China) Guizhou Renhe
69	Zheng Zhi	China	(China) Guangzhou Evergrande

Players with most international goals

Goals	Player	Nation	Club
28	Archie Thompson	Australia	(Australia) Melbourne Victory
18	Qu Bo	China	(China) Guizhou Renhe
16	Gao Lin	China	(China) Guangzhou Evergrande
