= Yang Xu =

Chinese footballer (born 1988)

Yang Xu 杨旭
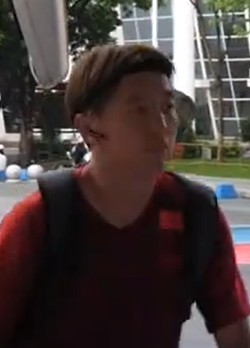

Personal information
- Full name: Yang Xu
- Date of birth: 12 February 1988 (age 38)
- Place of birth: Dalian, Liaoning, China
- Height: 1.88 m (6 ft 2 in)
- Position: Striker

Youth career
- 2001–2002: Dalian Yiteng
- 2003–2004: Liaoning Whowin

Senior career*
Years	Team	Apps	(Gls)
2005–2013	Liaoning Whowin	171	(52)
2013–2016	Shandong Luneng	74	(14)
2014	→ Changchun Yatai (loan)	11	(2)
2017–2019	Tianjin Tianhai	53	(17)
2017	→ Liaoning Whowin (loan)	9	(0)
2020–2023	Shanghai Shenhua	50	(4)
Total		368	(89)

International career
2003–2005	China U-17		
2009–2019	China	54	(28)
Medal record
Representing China
Men's football
EAFF Championship
Gold medal – first place	2010 Japan	Team
Silver medal – second place	2013 South Korea	Team
Silver medal – second place	2015 China	Team
AFC U-17 Championship
Gold medal – first place	2004 Japan	Team
- * Club domestic league appearances and goals

Yang Xu (simplified Chinese: 杨旭; traditional Chinese: 楊旭; pinyin: Yáng Xù; born 12 February 1988) is a Chinese former professional footballer who last played for Chinese Super League club Shanghai Shenhua.

== Club career ==
=== Liaoning Whowin ===
Yang Xu started his football career when he made his debut for Liaoning Whowin on 16 April 2005 in a 1–0 loss against Shanghai Shenhua. He scored his first goal for the club on 5 May 2005 in a 3–1 win against Shenzhen Jianlibao. By the end of the 2005 season, Yang scored three league goals in 11 appearances and saw his club finish in a tenth-place position. The following season would see Yang continue to establish himself with the squad by making a further 20 league appearances and scoring three goals; however, most of his appearances came from the bench. By the 2008 season, he was still a squad player trying to establish himself as the main striker within the team; however, he was unable to help Liaoning avoid relegation at the end of the season. Staying with the club, Yang was promoted to first-choice striker at the start of the 2009 league season and he would repay them with 15 league goals in 22 appearances, making him the second best goalscorer in the league. His goals would aid Liaoning to win the division title and immediate promotion back to the top flight.

=== Shandong Luneng ===
On 27 February 2013, Yang transferred to fellow Chinese Super League side Shandong Luneng. In July 2014, he was loaned to Changchun Yatai for the rest of the 2014 season.

=== Tianjin Quanjian ===
On 26 February 2017, Yang transferred to fellow top-tier side Tianjin Quanjian and was immediately loaned to his former club Liaoning Whowin for one season. He made his first appearance since returning to the club on 3 March 2017 in a 1–1 draw against Guizhou Zhicheng. He returned to Quanjian ahead of the 2018 season, scoring 18 goals in 62 appearances across 2 seasons.

=== Shanghai Shenhua ===
On 15 July 2020, Yang joined Shanghai Shenhua on a free transfer following the disbandment of Tianjin Tianhai. On 18 September 2020, he scored his first goal for the club, a penalty in a 1-1 draw against Guangzhou R&F in the first round of 2020 Chinese FA Cup, and Shenhua subsequently lost 5-3 in the penalty shootout. As a prolific centre forward throughout his career, Yang suffered from goal drought in his first 2 seasons at Shenhua. On 8 June 2022, Yang finally scored his first league goal for the club in a 2-0 win over derby rivals Shanghai Port.

On 11 April 2023, Yang announced his retirement from professional football via livestream.

== International career ==
Yang was called up to the Chinese national team and made his international debut on 30 September 2009 in a 4–1 win against Botswana. Despite playing for a second-tier side he would be tried out in several friendlies before he was given his chance to play in a qualifying match for the AFC Asian Cup in a 2–1 win against Vietnam on 17 January 2010 where he also scored his debut goal. On 30 March 2011, he scored twice in a 3–0 win against Honduras and on 23 July 2011, he scored a hat-trick in a 7–2 win against Laos.

== Career statistics ==
=== Club statistics ===
As of 20 October 2023

Appearances and goals by club, season and competition
Club	Season	League			National Cup		League Cup		Continental		Other		Total	
Club	Season	Division	Apps	Goals	Apps	Goals	Apps	Goals	Apps	Goals	Apps	Goals	Apps	Goals
Liaoning Whowin	2005	Chinese Super League	11	3	0	0	0	0	-		-		11	3
Liaoning Whowin	2006	Chinese Super League	20	3	0	0	-		-		-		20	3
Liaoning Whowin	2007	Chinese Super League	19	0	-		-		-		-		19	0
Liaoning Whowin	2008	Chinese Super League	14	3	-		-		-		-		14	3
Liaoning Whowin	2009	China League One	23	15	-		-		-		-		23	15
Liaoning Whowin	2010	Chinese Super League	27	11	-		-		-		-		27	11
Liaoning Whowin	2011	Chinese Super League	29	9	0	0	-		-		-		29	9
Liaoning Whowin	2012	Chinese Super League	28	8	4	2	-		-		-		32	10
Liaoning Whowin	Total		171	52	4	2	0	0	0	0	0	0	175	54
Shandong Luneng	2013	Chinese Super League	22	4	1	0	-		-		-		23	4
Shandong Luneng	2014	Chinese Super League	7	0	0	0	-		2	0	-		9	0
Shandong Luneng	2015	Chinese Super League	28	7	4	2	-		5	6	0 (Note: Appearances in Chinese FA Super Cup)	0	37	15
Shandong Luneng	2016	Chinese Super League	17	3	1	0	-		8	4	-		26	7
Shandong Luneng	Total		74	14	6	2	0	0	15	10	0	0	95	26
Changchun Yatai (loan)	2014	Chinese Super League	11	2	0	0	-		-		-		11	2
Tianjin Tianhai	2018	Chinese Super League	25	9	1	0	-		7	1	-		33	10
Tianjin Tianhai	2019	Chinese Super League	28	8	1	0	-		-		-		29	8
Tianjin Tianhai	Total		53	17	2	0	0	0	7	1	0	0	62	18
Liaoning Whowin (loan)	2017	Chinese Super League	9	0	0	0	-		-		-		9	0
Shanghai Shenhua	2020	Chinese Super League	16	0	1	1	-		0	0	-		17	1
Shanghai Shenhua	2021	Chinese Super League	14	0	6	1	-		-		-		20	1
Shanghai Shenhua	2022	Chinese Super League	20	4	1	0	-		-		-		21	4
Shanghai Shenhua	Total		50	4	8	2	0	0	0	0	0	0	58	6
Career total			368	89	20	6	0	0	22	11	0	0	410	106

=== International statistics ===
National team
Year	Apps	Goals
2009	1	0
2010	7	3
2011	10	6
2012	2	0
2013	7	2
2014	5	2
2015	11	8
2016	4	1
2017	0	0
2018	1	0
2019	6	6
Total	54	28

=== International goals ===
As of 10 October 2019
Scores and results list China's goal tally first.

No	Date	Venue	Opponent	Score	Result	Competition
1.	17 January 2010	Mỹ Đình National Stadium, Hanoi, Vietnam	Vietnam	1–0	2–1	2011 AFC Asian Cup qualification
2.	17 November 2010	Tuodong Stadium, Kunming, China	Latvia	1–0	1–0	Friendly
3.	18 December 2010	Zhuhai Sports Center, Zhuhai, China	Estonia	3–0	3–0	Friendly
4.	29 March 2011	Wuhan Sports Center Stadium, Wuhan, China	Honduras	2–0	3–0	Friendly
5.	29 March 2011	Wuhan Sports Center Stadium, Wuhan, China	Honduras	3–0	3–0	Friendly
6.	23 July 2011	Tuodong Stadium, Kunming, China	Laos	1–2	7–2	2014 FIFA World Cup qualification
7.	23 July 2011	Tuodong Stadium, Kunming, China	Laos	3–2	7–2	2014 FIFA World Cup qualification
8.	23 July 2011	Tuodong Stadium, Kunming, China	Laos	4–2	7–2	2014 FIFA World Cup qualification
9.	28 July 2011	New Laos National Stadium, Vientiane, Laos	Laos	6–1	6–1	2014 FIFA World Cup qualification
10.	28 July 2013	Olympic Stadium, Songpa-gu, South Korea	Australia	3–1	4–3	2013 EAFF East Asian Cup
11.	10 September 2013	Olympic Stadium, Tianjin, China	Malaysia	2–0	2–0	Friendly
12.	4 September 2014	Anshan Sports Centre Stadium, Anshan, China	Kuwait	1–1	3–1	Friendly
13.	10 October 2014	Wuhan Sports Center Stadium, Wuhan, China	Thailand	3–0	3–0	Friendly
	13 December 2014	Chenzhou Sports Center Stadium, Chenzhou, China	Kyrgyzstan	3–0	4–0	Friendly^{1}
	13 December 2014	Chenzhou Sports Center Stadium, Chenzhou, China	Kyrgyzstan	4–0	4–0	Friendly^{1}
	17 December 2014	Evergrande Football Base, Qingyuan, China	Kyrgyzstan	2–0	2–0	Friendly^{1}
	3 January 2015	Campbelltown Sports Stadium, Campbelltown, Australia	Oman	4–1	4–1	Friendly^{1}
14.	27 March 2015	Helong Stadium, Changsha, China	Haiti	1–1	2–2	Friendly
15.	16 June 2015	Changlimithang Stadium, Thimphu, Bhutan	Bhutan	1–0	6–0	2018 FIFA World Cup qualification
16.	16 June 2015	Changlimithang Stadium, Thimphu, Bhutan	Bhutan	3–0	6–0	2018 FIFA World Cup qualification
17.	16 June 2015	Changlimithang Stadium, Thimphu, Bhutan	Bhutan	5–0	6–0	2018 FIFA World Cup qualification
18.	12 November 2015	Helong Stadium, Changsha, China	Bhutan	2–0	12–0	2018 FIFA World Cup qualification
19.	12 November 2015	Helong Stadium, Changsha, China	Bhutan	4–0	12–0	2018 FIFA World Cup qualification
20.	12 November 2015	Helong Stadium, Changsha, China	Bhutan	6–0	12–0	2018 FIFA World Cup qualification
21.	12 November 2015	Helong Stadium, Changsha, China	Bhutan	8–0	12–0	2018 FIFA World Cup qualification
22.	24 March 2016	Wuhan Sports Center Stadium, Wuhan, China	Maldives	2–0	4–0	2018 FIFA World Cup qualification
23.	11 June 2019	Tianhe Stadium, Guangzhou, China	Tajikistan	1–0	1–0	Friendly
	30 August 2019	NFTC Stadium, Xianghe, China	Myanmar	1–0	4–1	Friendly^{1}
24.	10 September 2019	National Football Stadium, Malé, Maldives	Maldives	3–0	5–0	2022 FIFA World Cup qualification
25.	10 October 2019	Tianhe Stadium, Guangzhou, China	Guam	1–0	7–0	2022 FIFA World Cup qualification
26.	10 October 2019	Tianhe Stadium, Guangzhou, China	Guam	3–0	7–0	2022 FIFA World Cup qualification
27.	10 October 2019	Tianhe Stadium, Guangzhou, China	Guam	4–0	7–0	2022 FIFA World Cup qualification
28.	10 October 2019	Tianhe Stadium, Guangzhou, China	Guam	5–0	7–0	2022 FIFA World Cup qualification
1:Non FIFA 'A' international match

== Honours ==
=== Club ===
Liaoning Whowin

- China League One: 2009

Shandong Luneng

- Chinese FA Super Cup: 2015

=== International ===
China national under-17 football team

- AFC U-17 Championship: 2004

China PR national football team

- East Asian Football Championship: 2010
