= Wang Yunlong =

Chinese footballer

Wang Yunlong 王云龙
Personal information
- Date of birth: February 22, 1990 (age 36)
- Place of birth: Anshan, Liaoning, China
- Height: 1.70 m (5 ft 7 in)
- Position: Forward

Youth career
- 2004–2006: Genbao Football Base

Senior career*
Years	Team	Apps	(Gls)
2007–2011	Shanghai East Asia	49	(7)
2012	Jiangsu Sainty	4	(0)
2013–2014	Wuhan Zall	15	(0)
2014	→ Jiangxi Liansheng (loan)	17	(8)
2015–2016	Nei Mongol Zhongyou	26	(6)
2017	Zhejiang Yiteng	10	(0)
2018	Suzhou Dongwu	14	(1)
2019–2020	Guizhou Hengfeng	0	(0)

International career
2005–2006	China U17		
2007–2008	China U20		
2009–2010	China U23		
- * Club domestic league appearances and goals as of 31 December 2020

Wang Yunlong (Chinese: 王云龙; pinyin: Wáng Yúnlóng; born 22 February 1990) is a Chinese former football player.

== Club career ==
Wang joined Genbao Football Academy from Liaoning Youth in 2004 with a fee of ¥100,000 and was described by the academy's general manager Xu Genbao as being a hot prospect for the future. Wang was promoted to Shanghai East Asia squad in 2007 for the China League Two campaign. He made an impression within the team as Shanghai East Asia won promotion to the second tier at the end of the season. However, lingering injury kept him out of the field for the next several seasons.

On 2 February 2012, Wang transferred to Chinese Super League side Jiangsu Sainty with a fee of ¥3 million. He made his Super League debut on 10 March, in a 1–1 home draw against Shanghai Shenhua, coming on as a substitute for Sun Ke in the 80th minute. However, he failed to establish himself within the first team and played mostly in the reserve team league. He made just four appearances (30 minutes in total) in the 2012 league season.

Wang transferred to Wuhan Zall who was newly promoting to Super League on 14 December 2012. In January 2015, Wang transferred to China League One side Inner Mongolia Zhongyou. On 27 February 2017, Wang transferred to fellow League One side Zhejiang Yiteng.

In March 2018, Wang transferred to China League Two side Suzhou Dongwu.

== International career ==
Wang was called up to play for China U-17, China U-20 and China U-23 between 2005 and 2010. He played for China in the 2006 AFC U-17 Championship, 2008 AFC U-19 Championship and 2010 Asian Games.

== Career statistics ==
As of 31 December 2020.

Appearances and goals by club, season and competition
Club	Season	League			National Cup		Continental		Other		Total	
Club	Season	Division	Apps	Goals	Apps	Goals	Apps	Goals	Apps	Goals	Apps	Goals
Shanghai East Asia	2007	China League Two	0	0	-		-		-		0	0
Shanghai East Asia	2008	China League One	10	1	-		-		-		10	1
Shanghai East Asia	2009	China League One	8	3	-		-		-		8	3
Shanghai East Asia	2010	China League One	9	0	-		-		-		21	0
Shanghai East Asia	2011	China League One	22	3	2	0	-		-		24	3
Shanghai East Asia	Total		49	7	2	0	0	0	0	0	51	7
Jiangsu Sainty	2012	Chinese Super League	4	0	1	0	-		-		5	0
Wuhan Zall	2013	Chinese Super League	15	0	1	0	-		-		16	0
Jiangxi Liansheng (loan)	2014	China League Two	17	8	1	0	-		-		18	8
Nei Mongol Zhongyou	2015	China League One	15	5	1	0	-		-		16	5
Nei Mongol Zhongyou	2016	China League One	11	1	0	0	-		-		11	1
Nei Mongol Zhongyou	Total		26	6	1	0	0	0	0	0	27	6
Zhejiang Yiteng	2017	China League One	10	0	1	0	-		-		11	0
Suzhou Dongwu	2018	China League Two	14	1	0	0	-		-		14	1
Career total			135	22	7	0	0	0	0	0	142	22

== Honours ==
Shanghai East Asia

- China League Two: 2007

Jiangxi Liansheng

- China League Two: 2014
