= Wu Xi (footballer) =

Chinese footballer (born 1989)

Wu Xi 吴曦
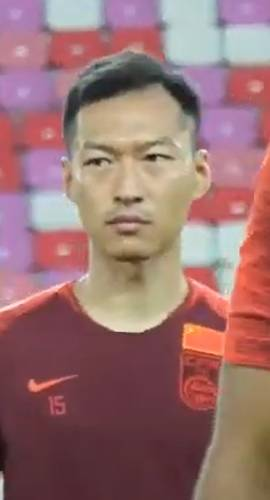
- Wu in 2019

Personal information
- Date of birth: 19 February 1989 (age 37)
- Place of birth: Shijiazhuang, Hebei, China
- Height: 1.80 m (5 ft 11 in)
- Position: Midfielder

Team information
- Current team: Shanghai Shenhua
- Number: 15

Senior career*
Years	Team	Apps	(Gls)
2008	Hebei Tiangong		
2009–2012	Shanghai Shenhua	80	(6)
2013–2020	Jiangsu Suning	207	(25)
2021–	Shanghai Shenhua	143	(28)

International career^{‡}
2007–2008	China U19	8	(0)
2009–2011	China U23	12	(2)
2011–	China	92	(9)
2026	China U23 (wildcard)	6	(1)
Medal record
Representing China
Men's football
EAFF Championship
Silver medal – second place	2013 South Korea	Team
Silver medal – second place	2015 China	Team
Bronze medal – third place	2017 Japan	Team
Asian Games
Bronze medal – third place	2026 Aichi–Nagoya	Team
- * Club domestic league appearances and goals as of 19 November 2026 ‡ National team caps and goals as of 22 January 2024

Wu Xi
- Simplified Chinese: 吴曦
- Traditional Chinese: 吳曦
Transcriptions
Standard Mandarin
- Hanyu Pinyin: Wú Xī
- IPA: [ǔ ɕí]

Wu Xi (Chinese: 吴曦; pinyin: Wú Xī; born 19 February 1989) is a Chinese professional footballer who plays for the Chinese Super League club Shanghai Shenhua, which he captains, and the China national team.

== Club career ==
Wu Xi started his football career with Hebei Tiangong in 2008 when the club was formed and joined the third tier. While the club only played one season in the division, Wu's development particularly with the Chinese national youth teams was impressive enough for top tier side Shanghai Shenhua to be interested in his services, signing for the club on 17 November 2009. At the start of the 2010 season, Wu would make his debut for the club on 3 April 2010 in a 2–1 win against Nanchang Bayi. He scored his first goal for the club on 17 April 2010 in a 2–0 win against Tianjin Teda.

Before the start of the 2013 season, Wu transferred to fellow Chinese Super League side Jiangsu Suning. He made his debut for the club on 26 February 2013 in a 5–1 loss against FC Seoul in the 2013 AFC Champions League. He would go on to establish himself as a regular within the team and go on to win the 2015 Chinese FA Cup against Shanghai Shenhua. This would be followed by the 2020 Chinese Super League title when he would win the clubs first league title with them.

On 28 February 2021, the parent company of Jiangsu Suning, Suning Holdings Group announced that operations were going to cease immediately due to financial difficulties. On 11 March 2021, Wu returned joined his former club Shenhua on a free transfer. On 16 June 2022, Wu would reach 100 Chinese Super League appearances for Shenhua in a 3–1 victory over Hebei.

== International career ==
Wu was first called up to the China under-19 national team in 2007 and took part in the 2008 AFC U-19 Championship. A regular with the side, he could only aid the team to the quarter-finals after he personally missed a penalty in a penalty shootout against Uzbekistan. After the tournament, he would move up to the China under-23 national team and then to the senior squad when he made his debut for then manager Gao Hongbo's last squad on 28 September 2011 in a 6–1 win against Laos during the 2014 FIFA World Cup qualification.

On 24 December 2014, Wu was named in China's squad for the 2015 AFC Asian Cup in Australia. In the team's second group match, he scored the equalizing goal as China won 2–1 against Uzbekistan to qualify for the knockout stage.

Wu played all five matches at the 2019 AFC Asian Cup in the United Arab Emirates as China reached the quarter-finals where they lost 3–0 to Iran.

On 12 December 2023, Wu was named in China's squad for the 2023 AFC Asian Cup in Qatar.

== Career statistics ==
=== Club ===
As of 9 August 2026

Appearances and goals by club, season and competition
Club	Season	League			National cup		Continental		Other		Total	
Club	Season	Division	Apps	Goals	Apps	Goals	Apps	Goals	Apps	Goals	Apps	Goals
Hebei Tiangong	2008	China League Two			–		–		–			
Shanghai Shenhua	2010	Chinese Super League	25	2	–		–		–		25	2
Shanghai Shenhua	2011	Chinese Super League	26	3	2	0	4	0	–		32	3
Shanghai Shenhua	2012	Chinese Super League	29	1	2	0	–		–		31	1
Shanghai Shenhua	Total		80	6	4	0	4	0	0	0	88	6
Jiangsu Suning	2013	Chinese Super League	29	3	2	1	5	0	1 (Note: Appearances in Chinese FA Super Cup)	0	37	4
Jiangsu Suning	2014	Chinese Super League	27	3	6	3	–		–		33	6
Jiangsu Suning	2015	Chinese Super League	30	5	6	2	–		–		36	7
Jiangsu Suning	2016	Chinese Super League	26	2	8	3	6	2	1	0	41	7
Jiangsu Suning	2017	Chinese Super League	18	1	2	1	7	1	1	0	28	3
Jiangsu Suning	2018	Chinese Super League	28	4	4	0	–		–		32	4
Jiangsu Suning	2019	Chinese Super League	29	5	1	0	–		–		30	5
Jiangsu Suning	2020	Chinese Super League	20	2	5	1	–		–		25	3
Jiangsu Suning	Total		207	25	34	11	18	3	3	0	262	39
Shanghai Shenhua	2021	Chinese Super League	17	3	0	0	–		–		17	3
Shanghai Shenhua	2022	Chinese Super League	21	1	1	0	–		–		22	1
Shanghai Shenhua	2023	Chinese Super League	19	2	4	0	–		–		23	2
Shanghai Shenhua	2024	Chinese Super League	29	7	0	0	10	0	1	0	40	7
Shanghai Shenhua	2025	Chinese Super League	28	9	0	0	7	0	1	0	36	9
Shanghai Shenhua	2026	Chinese Super League	20	5	2	0	0	0	–		22	5
Shanghai Shenhua	Total		134	27	7	0	17	0	2	0	160	27
Career total			421	58	45	11	39	3	5	0	509	72

=== International ===
Appearances and goals by national team and year
National team	Year	Apps	Goals
China	2011	5	0
China	2012	0	0
China	2013	4	1
China	2014	11	0
China	2015	14	1
China	2016	5	0
China	2017	8	1
China	2018	8	1
China	2019	13	3
China	2020	0	0
China	2021	9	2
China	2022	3	0
China	2023	7	0
China	2024	3	0
China	2026	2	0
Total		92	9

As of 12 October 2021

Scores and results list China's goal tally first, score column indicates score after each Wu goal.

List of international goals scored by Wu Xi
No.	Date	Venue	Opponent	Score	Result	Competition
1	15 October 2013	Gelora Bung Karno Stadium, Jakarta, Indonesia	Indonesia	1–0	1–1	2015 AFC Asian Cup qualification
2	14 January 2015	Brisbane Stadium, Brisbane, Australia	Uzbekistan	1–1	2–1	2015 AFC Asian Cup
3	13 June 2017	Hang Jebat Stadium, Krubong, Malaysia	Syria	2–1	2–2	2018 FIFA World Cup qualification
4	28 December 2018	Grand Hamad Stadium, Doha, Qatar	Jordan	1–0	1–1	Friendly
5	7 June 2019	Tianhe Stadium, Guangzhou, China	Philippines	1–0	2–0	Friendly
–	30 August 2019	NFTC Stadium, Xianghe, China	Myanmar	3–0	4–1	Friendly^{1}
–	30 August 2019	NFTC Stadium, Xianghe, China	Myanmar	4–0	4–1	Friendly^{1}
6	10 September 2019	National Football Stadium, Malé, Maldives	Maldives	1–0	5–0	2022 FIFA World Cup qualification
7	10 October 2019	Tianhe Stadium, Guangzhou, China	Guam	6–0	7–0	2022 FIFA World Cup qualification
8	30 May 2021	Suzhou Olympic Sports Centre, Suzhou, China	Guam	4–0	7–0	2022 FIFA World Cup qualification
9	12 October 2021	King Abdullah Sports City, Jeddah, Saudi Arabia	Saudi Arabia	2–3	2–3	2022 FIFA World Cup qualification
1: Non FIFA 'A' international match

== Honours ==
Jiangsu Suning

- Chinese Super League: 2020
- Chinese FA Cup: 2015
- Chinese FA Super Cup: 2013

Shanghai Shenhua

- Chinese FA Cup: 2023
- Chinese FA Super Cup: 2024, 2025

Individual

- Chinese Super League Team of the Year: 2015, 2016, 2019
