= Shijiazhuang Tiangong F.C. =

Chinese football club

Shijiazhuang Tiangong 石家庄天工
- Full name: Shijiazhuang Tiangong Football Club 石家庄天工俱乐部
- Founded: 2007; 19 years ago
- Dissolved: 2009; 17 years ago
- Ground: Yutong International Sports Center, Shijiazhuang, Hebei
- Capacity: 37,000
- League: China Yi League
Home colours	Away colours

Shijiazhuang Tiangong F.C. (Chinese: 石家庄天工俱乐部) was a semi-professional football club based in Shijiazhuang, Hebei, China.

== History ==
The club was founded in 2007 as a semi-professional football club before it was able to gain enough money to successfully register itself as a professional football club in 2008 to play at the bottom of the Chinese football league pyramid. They would rename themselves Hebei Tiangong and would come second in the Northern Group before being knocked out of the play-offs by Hunan Billows 2–1 in the first round. At the end of the season, they returned to be a semi-professional football club and did not compete in the league the following season.
