= Lu Bofei =

Chinese footballer

Lu Bofei[陆博飞]
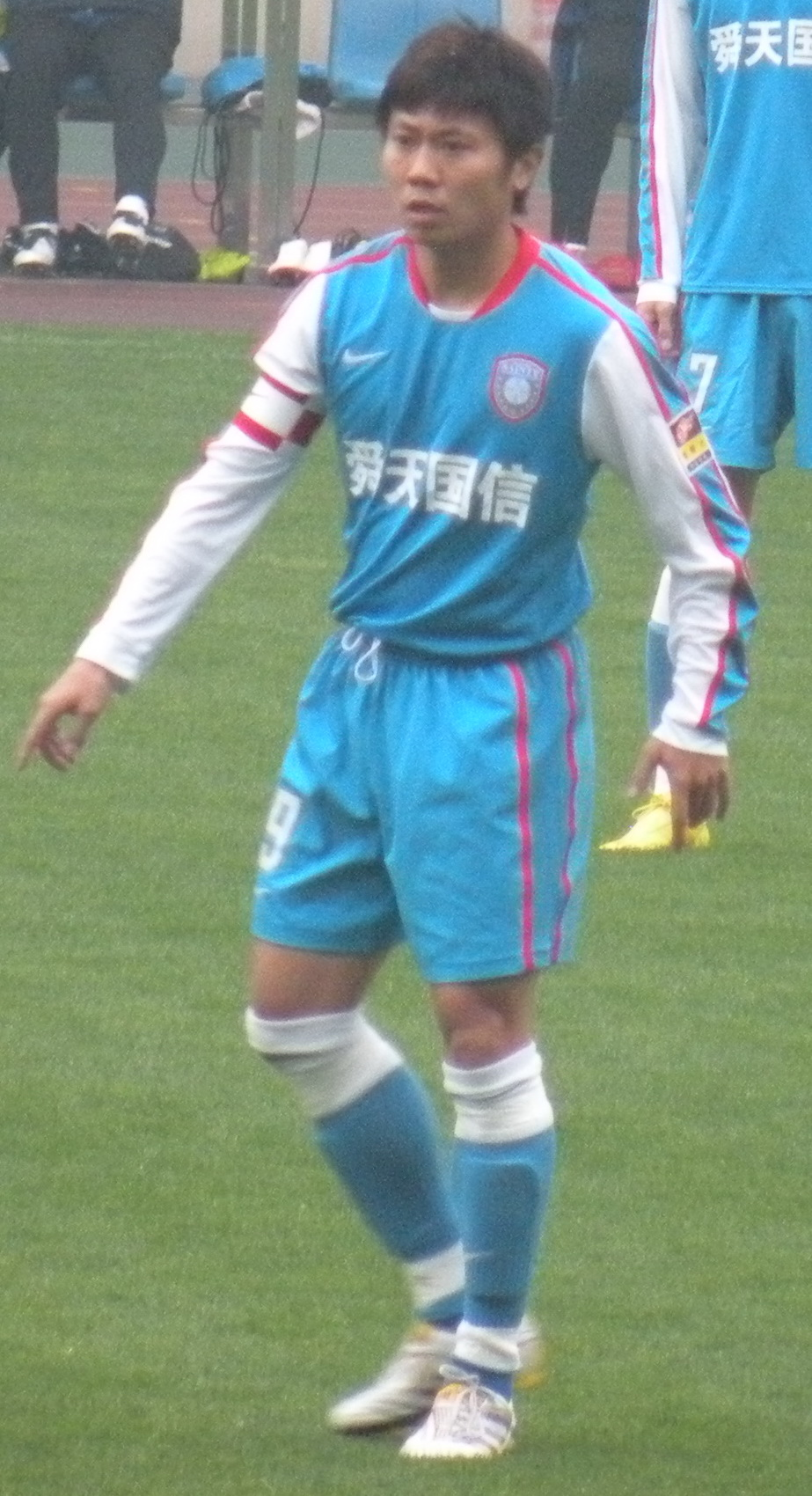

Personal information
- Date of birth: August 2, 1979 (age 47)
- Place of birth: Beijing, China
- Height: 1.75 m (5 ft 9 in)
- Position: Midfielder

Youth career
- Bayi

Senior career*
Years	Team	Apps	(Gls)
1999–2003	Bayi	64	(8)
2000	→ Changchun Yatai (loan)	19	(2)
2004–2006	Shenzhen Jianlibao	57	(7)
2007–2008	Wuhan Guanggu	37	(5)
2009–2015	Jiangsu Sainty	139	(13)

International career^{‡}
2008	China	1	(0)

Managerial career
- 2022–2023: Suzhou Dongwu
- * Club domestic league appearances and goals as of 5 November 2015 ‡ National team caps and goals as of 5 November 2013

Lu Bofei (simplified Chinese: 陆博飞; traditional Chinese: 陸博飛; pinyin: Lù Bófēi; born August 2, 1979) is a Chinese football manager and former footballer.

== Club career ==
Lu Bofei started his professional footballer career with Bayi Football Team in 1999, however he was loaned out to Changchun Yatai the following season to gain playing time. His loan was fairly successful and Lu Bofei played in 19 league games and scored 2 goals for Changchun Yatai. By the 2001 season Lu Bofei had established himself as regular member of the Bayi Football Team, however by 2003 Bayi had disbanded and Lu Bofei would move to Shenzhen Jianlibao. His move to Shenzhen Jianlibao (now known as Shenzhen Xiangxue Eisiti) was to prove extremely successful as Shenzhen Jianlibao won the China Super League with Lu Bofei playing a significant part in their success.

After a disappointing 2006 season which saw Shenzhen Jianlibao unable to build on their earlier success Lu Bofei moved to the newly promoted Wuhan Guanggu. His career at Wuhan Guanggu was to prove extremely disappointing as Lu Bofei was unable to establish himself as first choice regular and Wuhan Guanggu were controversially relegated then subsequently disbanded during the Chinese Super League 2008 league season after the club's management did not accept the punishment given to them by the Chinese Football Association after a scuffle broke out during a league game against Beijing Guoan on September 27, 2008. This lead Lu Bofei to join top tier club Jiangsu Shuntian at the beginning of the 2009 season.

== International career ==
Lu Bofei made his senior level debut coming on January 10, 2008 as a late substitute for Zhao Junzhe against United Arab Emirates in a friendly that ended in a 0-0 draw.

== Honours ==
Shenzhen Jianlibao

- Chinese Super League: 2004

Jiangsu Sainty

- Chinese FA Super Cup: 2013
