= Eleílson =

Brazilian footballer (born 1985)

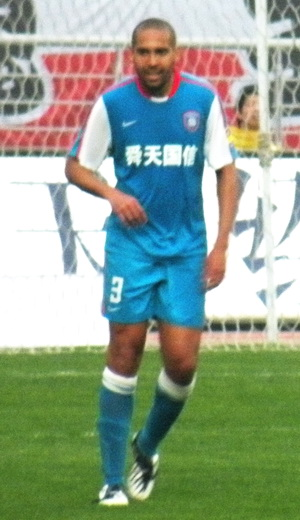

Personal information
- Full name: Eleílson Farias de Moura
- Date of birth: 2 April 1985 (age 41)
- Place of birth: Nova Era, Minas Gerais, Brazil
- Height: 1.94 m (6 ft 4 in)
- Position: Defender

Senior career*
Years	Team	Apps	(Gls)
2005–2006	Goiás	4	(0)
2005	→ Grêmio Anápolis (loan)	2	(0)
2008	Social	7	(1)
2008	Rio Branco	26	(2)
2009	Social	5	(0)
2009	→ Jiangsu Sainty (loan)	28	(0)
2010–2015	Jiangsu Sainty	141	(12)
- * Club domestic league appearances and goals

Eleílson Farias de Moura (born 2 April 1985 in Nova Era, Minas Gerais) is a Brazilian former professional footballer who played as a defender, most notably for Jiangsu Sainty.

== Club career ==
=== Professional ===
In March 2009, Chinese club Jiangsu Sainty had signed Eleílson on a season loan deal. After a successful season, Jiangsu Sainty decided to buy him and signed a three-year contract. Jiangu enjoyed a great 2012 season, achieving second place with Eleílson playing extremely well in the back line.

== Honours ==
=== Club ===
Jiangsu Suning

- Chinese FA Cup: 2015
