= Sergey Krivets =

Belarusian midfielder (born 1986)

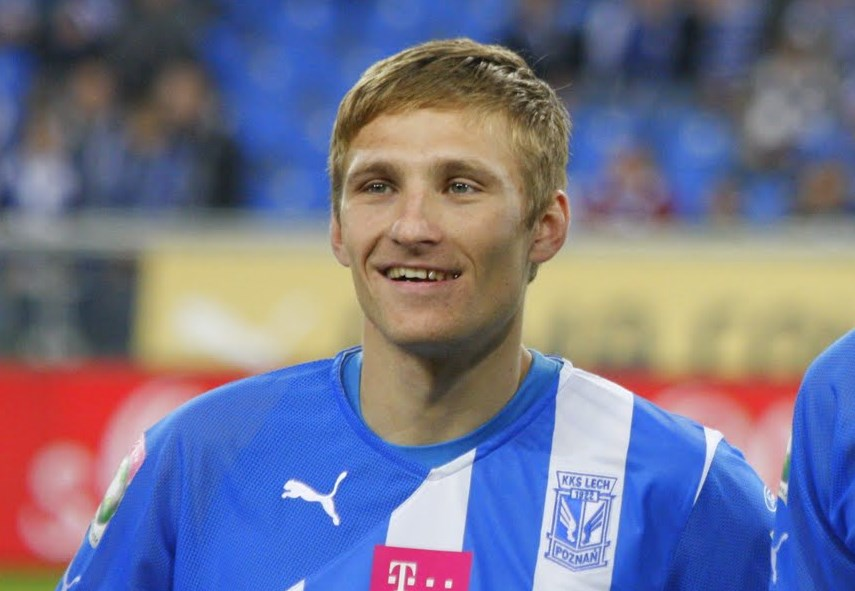
- Krivets with Lech Poznań in 2011

Personal information
- Full name: Sergey Vyacheslavovich Krivets
- Date of birth: 8 June 1986 (age 40)
- Place of birth: Grodno, Belarusian SSR, Soviet Union
- Height: 1.77 m (5 ft 10 in)
- Position: Midfielder

Senior career*
Years	Team	Apps	(Gls)
2003–2006	Lokomotiv Minsk	52	(15)
2006–2009	BATE Borisov	92	(28)
2010–2012	Lech Poznań	59	(8)
2012–2013	Jiangsu Sainty	20	(1)
2013–2014	BATE Borisov	35	(18)
2014–2016	Metz	36	(2)
2015	→ Metz B	6	(1)
2016–2017	Wisła Płock	23	(2)
2017–2018	Arka Gdynia	10	(2)
2018–2020	Dinamo Brest	32	(6)
2021–2022	Lech Poznań II	47	(8)
2022–2024	Wiara Lecha Poznań	41	(17)
2025–2026	Warta Poznań II	15	(3)
Total		468	(112)

International career
2004	Belarus U19	3	(0)
2006–2009	Belarus U21	25	(5)
2008–2016	Belarus	38	(5)
- * Club domestic league appearances and goals

Sergey Vyacheslavovich Krivets (Belarusian: Сярге́й Вячасла́вавіч Крыве́ц, Russian: Серге́й Вячесла́вович Криве́ц, Polish: Siarhiej Właczesławowicz Krywiec; born 8 June 1986) is a Belarusian former professional footballer who played as a midfielder.

== Club career ==
On 30 September 2008, Krivets scored BATE Borisov's (and a Belarusian side's) first ever Champions League group stage goal in a 2–2 draw against Juventus, assisted by teammate Igor Stasevich.

On 22 December 2009, Polish club Lech Poznań signed the Belarusian midfielder from BATE until June 2013.

On 9 July 2012, Krivets was transferred to Chinese club Jiangsu Sainty on a deal until the end of 2015. On 20 June 2013, Krivets had his Jiangsu contract terminated by mutual consent.

On 25 July 2017, Krivets signed a contract with Arka Gdynia. Krivets joined Dynamo Brest in June 2018, putting pet to paper on a contract for two and a half years.

On 6 February 2021, he returned to Lech to join the reserve team, with the aim of mentoring youth players. He left the team at the end of the 2021–22 season after his contract had expired.

On 11 August 2022, he was registered to play for fan-owned V liga side Wiara Lecha Poznań. He retired from football at the end of the 2023–24 season.

In October 2025, Krivets resumed his playing career and joined Warta Poznań's reserve team as a player-assistant.

== International career ==
Krivets made his debut for the national team on 2 February 2008, in a 2–0 win over Iceland as part of the 2008 Malta International Football Tournament.

== Coaching career ==
In July 2025, Krivets joined Warta Poznań's under-17 team's staff as an assistant coach. In October that year, he moved up to Warta II's coaching staff.

== Career statistics ==
=== International ===
Appearances and goals by national team and year
National team	Year	Apps	Goals
Belarus
Belarus	2008	1	0
Belarus	2009	3	0
Belarus	2010	8	1
Belarus	2011	4	0
Belarus	2012	1	0
Belarus	2013	4	0
Belarus	2014	9	3
Belarus	2015	1	0
Belarus	2016	7	1
Total		38	5

Scores and results list Belarus' goal tally first, score column indicates score after each Krivets goal.

List of international goals scored by Sergey Krivets
No.	Date	Venue	Opponent	Score	Result	Competition
1	12 October 2010	Dinamo National Olympic Stadium, Minsk, Belarus	Albania	2–0	2–0	UEFA Euro 2012 qualifying
2	5 March 2014	Vasil Levski National Stadium, Sofia, Bulgaria	Bulgaria	1–2	1–2	Friendly
3	21 May 2014	Rheinpark Stadion, Vaduz, Liechtenstein	Liechtenstein	3–0	5–1	Friendly
4	4 September 2014	Borisov Arena, Barysaw, Belarus	Tajikistan	3–0	6–1	Friendly
5	31 August 2016	Ullevaal Stadion, Oslo, Norway	Norway	1–0	1–0	Friendly

== Honours ==
BATE

- Belarusian Premier League: 2006, 2007, 2008, 2009, 2013, 2014
- Belarusian Cup: 2005–06, 2009–10
- Belarusian Super Cup: 2014

Lech Poznań

- Ekstraklasa: 2009–10

Jiangsu Sainty

- Chinese Super League runners-up: 2012
- Chinese FA Super Cup: 2013

Dinamo Brest

- Belarusian Premier League: 2019
- Belarusian Super Cup: 2020

Wiara Lecha Poznań

- V liga Greater Poland, group II: 2022–23

Individual

- Belarusian Premier League Best Player: 2009
- The best 22 Players of Belarusian Premier League by FFB: 2007, 2008, 2009, 2013
- Chinese FA Super Cup Most Valuable Player: 2013
