= Deng Xiaofei =

Chinese footballer (born 1983)

Deng Xiaofei 邓小飞
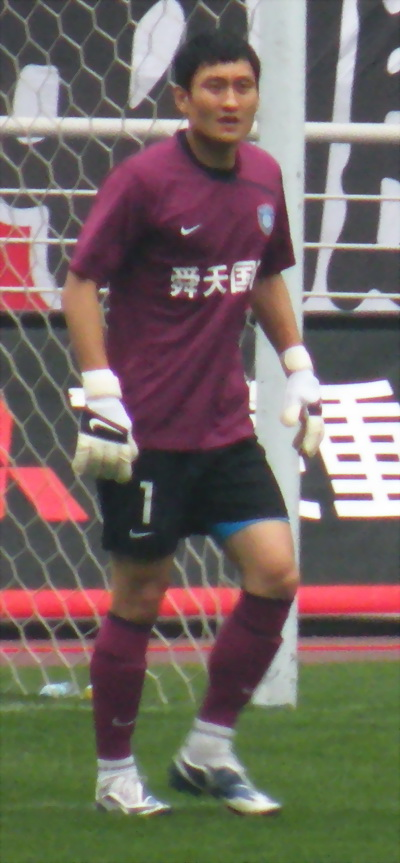

Personal information
- Full name: Deng Xiaofei
- Date of birth: 31 May 1983 (age 43)
- Place of birth: Qingdao, Shandong, China
- Height: 1.86 m (6 ft 1 in)
- Position: Goalkeeper

Youth career
- 2000: Shandong Luneng

Senior career*
Years	Team	Apps	(Gls)
2001–2006	Shandong Luneng	21	(0)
2007–2008	Wuhan Guanggu	43	(0)
2009–2015	Jiangsu Sainty	122	(0)
2016–2022	Chongqing Lifan	98	(0)
2019	→ Zhejiang Greentown (loan)	28	(0)
2022–2023	Jinan Xingzhou	30	(0)
Total		343	(0)
- * Club domestic league appearances and goals as of 28 October 2023

Deng Xiaofei (simplified Chinese: 邓小飞; traditional Chinese: 鄧小飛; pinyin: Dèng Xiǎofēi; born 31 May 1983) is a Chinese former football goalkeeper.

== Club career ==
=== Shandong Luneng ===
A product of the Shandong Luneng youth team he would graduate to the senior team in 2001 and eventually established himself as the team's first choice goalkeeper in the 2003 league season. When the new manager Ljubiša Tumbaković came in at the beginning of the 2004 league season he would bring in Zong Lei as competition for the first choice goalkeeper position. Deng Xiaofei would see his playing time significantly drop, however during this period he would still aid the club to actually win the Chinese FA Cup and Chinese Super League Cup that season. The following season would see youth team player Yang Cheng immediately promoted as first choice goalkeeper, Deng Xiaofei lost favor within the team and was relegated to third choice goalkeeper. When Chinese international goalkeeper Li Leilei came into the team in 2006 Deng Xiaofei was allowed to leave the club.

=== Wuhan Guangu ===
He would transfer to top-tier club Wuhan Guanggu in the beginning of the 2007 league season and would immediately establish himself as their first choice goalkeeper where he only missed one league match throughout the entire league season. The following campaign he would continue to be a consistent regular within the team despite the club's difficult start to the season saw them in the relegation zone, however the team decided to controversially disband during the season after having a dispute with the Chinese Football Association over the club's punishment against Beijing Guoan on 27 September 2008 where a scuffle broke out during that league game. Without a club, Deng Xiaofei would have to wait before the 2009 league season before he could join another team, however he soon found a buyer in the newly promoted top-tier club Jiangsu Sainty at the start of the 2009 Chinese Super League.

=== Jiangsu Sainty ===
Deng Xiaofei would make his competitive debut for Jiangsu Sainty in the club's first game of the season on 22 March 2009 against Shanghai Shenhua, which Jiangsu Sainty lost 2–1. Throughout the season he would constantly fight for the first team goalkeeping position against existing goalkeeper Guan Zhen as the team finished in a respectable tenth within the league. The fight for the goalkeeping spot continued until the 2011 Chinese Super League season saw Guan Zhen start as the club's first choice goalkeeper until a difficult start to the campaign saw the club in the relegation zone, this saw Dragan Okuka introduced as the team's new manager and he installed Deng Xiaofei as the first choice goalkeeper while the club finished in their best ever spot of fourth within the league.

On 28 April 2012, Deng set a new Super League record for consecutive clean sheets with 643 minutes, beating the previous record of 620 minutes set by Yang Zhi of Beijing Guoan in the 2011 season. He appeared in every minute of the 2012 league season, playing in all 30 Super League games for Jiangsu Sainty as the club achieved runners-up in the league and gained the entry into their first AFC Champions League. Deng was awarded the Goalkeeper of The Year award from CFA in November. However, Deng's position became unstable after the 2013 season. He lost his position to Zhang Sipeng in the 2015 season.

=== Chongqing Lifan ===
On 2 January 2016, Deng transferred to fellow Chinese Super League side Chongqing Lifan after Gu Chao joined Jiangsu Suning in a domestic record transfer for a goalkeeper. He made his debut on 6 March 2016 in a 2–1 home win against Guangzhou Evergrande. He played every minute of the league for Chongqing in the 2016 season.

Deng was loaned to China League One side Zhejiang Greentown for the 2019 season.

On 29 January 2026, Deng was given a lifetime ban for match-fixing by the Chinese Football Association.

== Career statistics ==
Statistics accurate as of match played 28 October 2023.

Appearances and goals by club, season and competition
Club	Season	League			National Cup		League Cup		Continental		Other		Total	
Club	Season	Division	Apps	Goals	Apps	Goals	Apps	Goals	Apps	Goals	Apps	Goals	Apps	Goals
Shandong Luneng	2001	Jia-A League	0	0		0	-		-		-		0	0
Shandong Luneng	2002	Jia-A League	2	0		0	-		-		-		2	0
Shandong Luneng	2003	Jia-A League	11	0		0	-		-		-		11	0
Shandong Luneng	2004	Chinese Super League	8	0		0		0	-		-		8	0
Shandong Luneng	2005	Chinese Super League	0	0		0		0		0	-		0	0
Shandong Luneng	2006	Chinese Super League	0	0		0	-		-		-		0	0
Shandong Luneng	Total		21	0	0	0	0	0	0	0	0	0	21	0
Wuhan Guanggu	2007	Chinese Super League	26	0	-		-		-		-		26	0
Wuhan Guanggu	2008	Chinese Super League	17	0	-		-		-		-		17	0
Wuhan Guanggu	Total		43	0	0	0	0	0	0	0	0	0	43	0
Jiangsu Sainty	2009	Chinese Super League	15	0	-		-		-		-		15	0
Jiangsu Sainty	2010	Chinese Super League	13	0	-		-		-		-		13	0
Jiangsu Sainty	2011	Chinese Super League	21	0	1	0	-		-		-		22	0
Jiangsu Sainty	2012	Chinese Super League	30	0	0	0	-		-		-		30	0
Jiangsu Sainty	2013	Chinese Super League	19	0	0	0	-		6	0	1 (Note: Appearance in Chinese FA Super Cup)	0	26	0
Jiangsu Sainty	2014	Chinese Super League	17	0	7	0	-		-		-		24	0
Jiangsu Sainty	2015	Chinese Super League	8	0	2	0	-		-		-		10	0
Jiangsu Sainty	Total		122	0	10	0	0	0	6	0	1	0	139	0
Chongqing Lifan	2016	Chinese Super League	30	0	0	0	-		-		-		30	0
Chongqing Lifan	2017	Chinese Super League	28	0	0	0	-		-		-		28	0
Chongqing Lifan	2018	Chinese Super League	13	0	0	0	-		-		-		13	0
Chongqing Lifan	2020	Chinese Super League	11	0	0	0	-		-		-		11	0
Chongqing Lifan	2021	Chinese Super League	16	0	1	0	-		-		-		17	0
Chongqing Lifan	Total		98	0	1	0	0	0	0	0	0	0	99	0
Zhejiang Greentown (loan)	2019	China League One	28	0	0	0	-		-		-		28	0
Jinan Xingzhou	2022	China League Two	5	0	4	0	-		-		-		9	0
Jinan Xingzhou	2023	China League One	25	0	0	0	-		-		-		25	0
Jinan Xingzhou	Total		30	0	4	0	0	0	0	0	0	0	34	0
Career total			343	0	15	0	0	0	6	0	1	0	365	0

== Honours ==
=== Club ===
Shandong Luneng

- Chinese FA Cup: 2004, 2006
- Chinese Super League: 2006

Jiangsu Sainty

- Chinese FA Cup: 2015
- Chinese FA Super Cup: 2013

=== Individual ===
- Chinese Super League Team of the Year: 2012
- Chinese Football Association Goalkeeper of the Year: 2012
