= Ren Hang (footballer) =

Chinese footballer (born 1989)

Ren Hang 任航
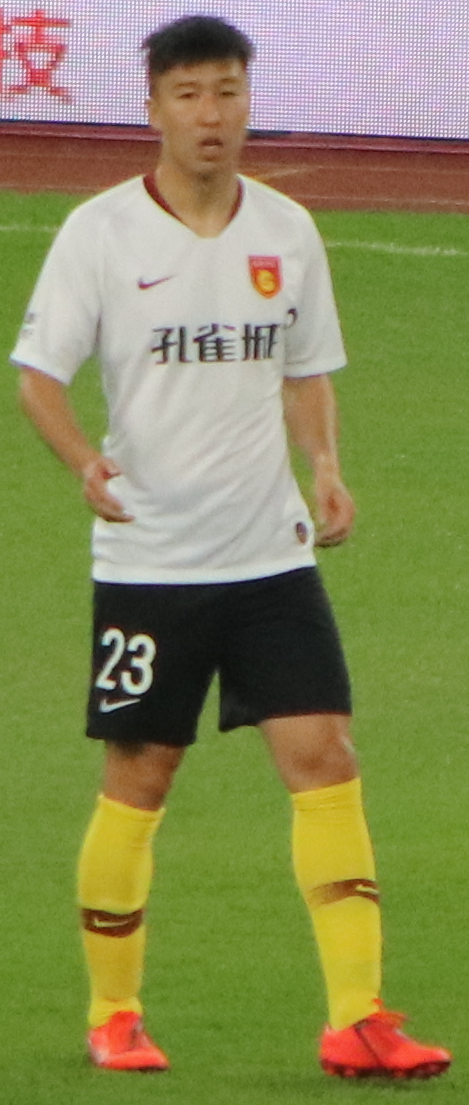
- Ren in 2019

Personal information
- Full name: Ren Hang
- Date of birth: 23 February 1989 (age 37)
- Place of birth: Shenyang, Liaoning, China
- Height: 1.84 m (6 ft 0 in)
- Positions: Centre-back; full-back

Youth career
- 2004–2007: Changsha Ginde

Senior career*
Years	Team	Apps	(Gls)
2007–2010	Changsha Ginde	58	(0)
2011–2016	Jiangsu Suning	141	(8)
2017–2021	Hebei China Fortune	87	(4)
2021	→ Wuhan Three Towns (loan)	30	(0)
2022–2025	Wuhan Three Towns	77	(1)

International career^{‡}
2009–2010	China U23		
2014–2017	China	32	(1)
Medal record
Representing China
Men's football
EAFF Championship
Silver medal – second place	2015 China	Team
- * Club domestic league appearances and goals as of 28 August 2025 ‡ National team caps and goals as of 5 September 2017

Ren Hang (Chinese: 任航; pinyin: Rén Háng; Mandarin pronunciation: [ɻə̌n.xǎŋ]; born 23 February 1989) is a Chinese former professional footballer who played as a centre-back or full-back.

== Club career ==
Ren Hang started his football career with Changsha Ginde in the 2007 season when he made his debut for the club on 4 October 2007 in a 2-0 loss against Shanghai Shenhua. By the following season, he had established himself as a vital member of the team by playing in 24 games as Changsha finished mid-table at the end of the 2008 season. He continued to be a regular within the team's defense until the 2010 season when the club had a poor run of form that saw Ren dropped from the team as the club was relegated from the first tier.

Before the start of the 2011 season, Ren was allowed to leave the club and he transferred to top tier side Jiangsu Suning. He made his debut for the club on 3 April 2011 in a 2-0 loss against Beijing Guoan. With Ren's versatility in defence where he could also play as a left-back, it would see him become a vital member of the team as results gradually improved and the club finished in their best ever league place of fourth at the end of the 2011 season. He would go on to become the clubs captain and lead the team to the 2015 Chinese FA Cup trophy.

Ren was degraded to Jiangsu's reserve team in June 2016 due to a contract dispute with the club. On 16 September 2016, he terminated his contract with Jiangsu and joined fellow Chinese Super League side Hebei China Fortune; however, he was unable to play for the club until the 2017 season. He made his debut for the club on 5 March 2017 in a 0-0 draw against Henan Jianye.

On 11 April 2021 he would be loaned out to second tier club Wuhan Three Towns for the 2021 China League One campaign. The move would turn out to be a big successes and he would go on to establish himself as a vital member of the team and help aid the club to win the league title and gain promotion as the club entered the top tier for the first time in their history. The following campaign Wuhan would make the move permanent and he would lead the squad to win the 2022 Chinese Super League title for the first time in the clubs history.

On 30 August 2026, Ren officially announced his retirement in the interview with dongqiudi.

== International career ==
Ren made his debut for the Chinese national team on 18 June 2014 in a 2-0 win against Macedonia. He would subsequently go on to be included in the squad for the 2015 AFC Asian Cup and participated in three games as China were knocked out in the quarter-finals by Australia. He scored his first international goal on 7 June 2017 in an 8-1 win against the Philippines.

== Career statistics ==
=== Club statistics ===
As of 11 January 2023.

Appearances and goals by club, season and competition
Club	Season	League			National Cup		Continental		Other		Total	
Club	Season	Division	Apps	Goals	Apps	Goals	Apps	Goals	Apps	Goals	Apps	Goals
Changsha Ginde	2007	Chinese Super League	3	0	-		-		-		3	0
Changsha Ginde	2008	Chinese Super League	24	0	-		-		-		24	0
Changsha Ginde	2009	Chinese Super League	22	0	-		-		-		22	0
Changsha Ginde	2010	Chinese Super League	10	0	-		-		-		10	0
Changsha Ginde	Total		58	0	0	0	0	0	0	0	58	0
Jiangsu Suning	2011	Chinese Super League	28	1	0	0	-		-		28	1
Jiangsu Suning	2012	Chinese Super League	30	1	1	0	-		-		31	1
Jiangsu Suning	2013	Chinese Super League	20	0	2	0	6	0	1 (Note: Appearances in Chinese FA Super Cup)	0	29	0
Jiangsu Suning	2014	Chinese Super League	25	1	7	0	-		-		32	1
Jiangsu Suning	2015	Chinese Super League	26	2	6	1	-		-		32	3
Jiangsu Suning	2016	Chinese Super League	12	3	1	0	6	0	1	0	20	3
Jiangsu Suning	Total		141	8	17	1	12	0	2	0	172	9
Hebei China Fortune	2017	Chinese Super League	23	1	0	0	-		-		23	1
Hebei China Fortune	2018	Chinese Super League	22	1	2	1	-		-		24	2
Hebei China Fortune	2019	Chinese Super League	25	1	0	0	-		-		25	1
Hebei China Fortune	2020	Chinese Super League	17	1	0	0	-		-		17	1
Hebei China Fortune	Total		87	4	2	1	0	0	0	0	89	5
Wuhan Three Towns (loan)	2021	China League One	30	0	0	0	-		-		30	0
Wuhan Three Towns	2022	Chinese Super League	23	1	0	0	-		-		23	1
Career total			339	13	19	2	12	0	2	0	372	15

=== International statistics ===
National team
Year	Apps	Goals
2014	9	0
2015	13	0
2016	7	0
2017	3	1
Total	32	1

=== International goals ===
As of 7 June 2017
Scores and results list China's goal tally first.

No	Date	Venue	Opponent	Score	Result	Competition
1.	7 June 2017	Tianhe Stadium, Guangzhou, China	Philippines	6–1	8–1	Friendly international

== Honours ==
Jiangsu Suning

- Chinese FA Cup: 2015
- Chinese FA Super Cup: 2013

Wuhan Three Towns

- Chinese Super League: 2022
- China League One: 2021
- Chinese FA Super Cup: 2023
