= Jiang Jiajun =

Chinese footballer

Jiang Jiajun 姜嘉俊
Personal information
- Date of birth: January 8, 1990 (age 36)
- Place of birth: Shanghai, China
- Height: 1.81 m (5 ft 11 1/2 in)
- Positions: Full-back; midfielder

Youth career
- 2000–2005: Genbao Football Academy
- 2007–2009: Shanghai Shenhua

Senior career*
Years	Team	Apps	(Gls)
2006	Shanghai East Asia		
2009–2011	Shanghai Shenhua	47	(1)
2012–2013	Jiangsu Sainty	34	(1)
2014–2016	Shanghai Shenxin	65	(2)
2017	Shandong Luneng	3	(0)
2018–2020	Chongqing Lifan	2	(0)

International career^{‡}
2011	China U-23	4	(0)
- * Club domestic league appearances and goals as of 31 December 2020 ‡ National team caps and goals as of 5 November 2013

Jiang Jiajun (Chinese: 姜嘉俊; pinyin: Jiāng Jiājùn; born January 8, 1990) is a former Chinese football player who played as a full-back or midfielder.

== Club career ==
Jiang Jiajun played for the Shanghai Shenhua youth team until he was promoted to the senior team during the 2009 football league season. He went on to make his debut in a league game on September 16, 2009 against Qingdao Jonoon F.C. in a 2-1 defeat. The following season Miroslav Blažević came in as the Head manager and he decided to move Jiang Jiajun to full-back during the season, this seemed to work as he went on to a vital member of the team that ended the campaign in third. The following season saw Xi Zhikang become the new Shenhua coach and Jiang saw significantly more time in midfield where he went on to score his first senior goal on 19 April 2011 against Sydney FC in an AFC Champions League game, which ended in a 3-2 defeat. As the season progressed and despite Shenhua bringing in another coach in Dražen Besek during the season Jiang continued to gain significant playing time off the bench and scored his first league goal on September 28, 2011 in a game against Hangzhou Greentown, which Shenhua won 3-2.

At the beginning of the 2012 Chinese Super League season Jiang had a chance to return to his hometown when he joined top-tier side Jiangsu Sainty for a reported $1.1 million on the final transfer day. In February 2014, Jiang was signed for fellow Chinese Super League side Shanghai Shenxin.

On February 27, 2017, Jiang transferred to Super League side Shandong Luneng Taishan. He made his debut for the club on July 9, 2017, in a 2–0 away win against Tianjin Teda. He failed to establish himself within the club, playing just three league matches in the 2017 season.

Jiang moved to fellow Super League club Chongqing Dangdai Lifan on January 15, 2018.

== International career ==
After an impressive 2010 league season for Shenhua, Jiang was called up to the Chinese U-23 football team where he was re-united with his previous manager Miroslav Blažević. Jiang made his debut in a friendly on June 3, 2011 against the North Korean U-23 team in a 2-1 defeat. He was then part of the squad that took part in the 2012 Olympic qualification process that saw China being knocked-out by the Oman U-23 team.

== Career statistics ==
Statistics accurate as of match played 31 December 2020.

Appearances and goals by club, season and competition
Club	Season	League			National Cup		Continental		Other		Total	
Club	Season	Division	Apps	Goals	Apps	Goals	Apps	Goals	Apps	Goals	Apps	Goals
Shanghai East Asia	2006	China League Two			-		-		-			
Shanghai Shenhua	2009	Chinese Super League	2	0	-		0	0	-		2	0
Shanghai Shenhua	2010	Chinese Super League	17	0	-		-		-		17	0
Shanghai Shenhua	2011	Chinese Super League	28	1	0	0	5	1	-		33	2
Shanghai Shenhua	Total		47	1	0	0	5	1	0	0	52	2
Jiangsu Sainty	2012	Chinese Super League	24	1	0	0	-		-		24	1
Jiangsu Sainty	2013	Chinese Super League	10	0	0	0	5	0	1 (Note: Appearance in Chinese FA Super Cup)	0	16	0
Jiangsu Sainty	Total		34	1	0	0	5	0	1	0	40	1
Shanghai Shenxin	2014	Chinese Super League	26	1	1	0	-		-		27	1
Shanghai Shenxin	2015	Chinese Super League	16	0	0	0	-		-		16	0
Shanghai Shenxin	2016	China League One	23	1	1	0	-		-		24	1
Shanghai Shenxin	Total		65	2	2	0	0	0	0	0	67	2
Shandong Luneng	2017	Chinese Super League	3	0	0	0	-		-		3	0
Chongqing Lifan	2018	Chinese Super League	2	0	0	0	-		-		2	0
Career total			151	4	2	0	10	1	1	0	164	5

== Honours ==
=== Club ===
Jiangsu Sainty

- Chinese FA Super Cup: 2013
