= Li Chi (footballer) =

Chinese footballer

Li Chi 李炽
Personal information
- Full name: Li Chi
- Date of birth: March 6, 1983 (age 43)
- Place of birth: Wuhua, Guangdong, China
- Height: 1.73 m (5 ft 8 in)
- Position: Midfielder

Youth career
- Guangdong Youth

Senior career*
Years	Team	Apps	(Gls)
2003–2004	Guangdong Xiongying	42	(1)
2005–2014	Jiangsu Sainty	144	(11)
- * Club domestic league appearances and goals

Li Chi (simplified Chinese: 李炽; traditional Chinese: 李熾; pinyin: Lǐ Chì; born 6 March 1983 in Wuhua) is a Chinese football player.

== Club career ==
=== Shenzhen Kejian ===
Li Chi would start his professional football career in the 2003 league season when he joined second tier football club Guangdong Xiongying and under the club's manager Wang Baoshan, he would immediately go on to be a vital member of the team which finished seventh. With the club facing financial difficulties the club moved to Shenzhen in hopes of getting better crowds and the club changed their name to Shenzhen Kejian to represent this. The move turned out to be disappointing on and off the field as the club finished the league tenth as well as becoming bankrupt in the process.

=== Jiangsu Sainty ===
Li transferred to second tier club Jiangsu Sainty in 2005 along with his previous coach Wang Baoshan and within his debut season see the club finish the league in fifth. The following season would see Wang Baoshan join top tier club Shenzhen Jianlibao, however Li remained as a succession of coaches came in to try to win promotion until Pei Encai came in and Li would play in fourteen league games and scored one goal as Jiangsu won the division title at the end of the 2008 China League One season.

== Honours ==
Jiangsu Sainty

- China League One: 2008
