= Liu Jianye =

Chinese footballer (born 1987)

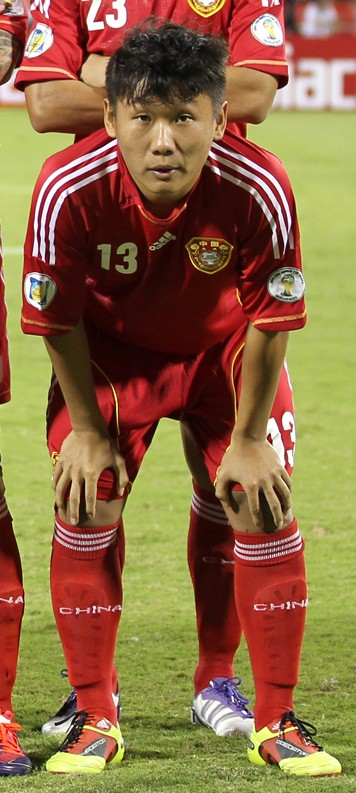

Personal information
- Full name: Liu Jianye
- Date of birth: 17 June 1987 (age 39)
- Place of birth: Shenyang, Liaoning, China
- Height: 1.78 m (5 ft 10 in)
- Positions: Defender; defensive midfielder

Team information
- Current team: Chongqing Tonglianglong (head coach)

Senior career*
Years	Team	Apps	(Gls)
2005–2010	Changsha Ginde	152	(14)
2011–2020	Jiangsu Suning	177	(2)
2019	→ Guangdong South China Tiger (loan)	27	(0)
2020	→ Taizhou Yuanda (loan)	11	(0)
2021	Xiamen Egret Island	0	(0)
2022	Heilongjiang Ice City	4	(0)
Total		371	(16)

International career^{‡}
2009–2015	China	45	(0)

Managerial career
- 2021: Xiamen Egret Island (player-coach)
- 2022: Heilongjiang Ice City (player-coach)
- 2023: Shenzhen FC (assistant)
- 2024: Shanghai Jiading Huilong U18
- 2025: Jiangxi Dingnan United
- 2026–: Chongqing Tonglianglong
Medal record
Representing China
Men's football
EAFF Championship
Gold medal – first place	2010 Japan	Team
Silver medal – second place	2013 South Korea	Team
Silver medal – second place	2015 China	Team
- * Club domestic league appearances and goals as of 31 December 2020 ‡ National team caps and goals as of 31 October 2015

Liu Jianye (simplified Chinese: 刘建业; traditional Chinese: 劉建業; pinyin: Liú Jiànyè; born 17 June 1987) is a Chinese football coach and former footballer who played as defender and defensive midfielder. He is currently the manager of Chongqing Tonglianglong.

== Club career ==
Liu Jianye started his football career with Shenyang Ginde in the 2005 league season where he immediately made an impact within the club after making his debut on 30 April 2005 in a 1-0 win against Chongqing Lifan. Throughout the season, he played in 19 league games and scored his first goal against Shanghai Shenhua in a 6-1 loss. His position within the team was cemented the following season when Liu played in a further 25 leagues games for the club and helped them avoid relegation throughout much of the 2006 league season. At the beginning of the 2007 league season, Shenyang moved to Changsha and rename themselves Changsha Ginde; however, despite Liu becoming a vital member of the squad due to his versatility, the next several seasons saw the club become consistent relegation strugglers and were eventually relegated at the end of the 2010 season.

Despite being relegated with Changsha, Liu established himself within the China national team and was quickly transferred to fellow Chinese Super League side Jiangsu Sainty in December 2010 for an undisclosed fee. He was named club captain during the 2011 season and established himself as a pivotal part of the club's backline.

On 25 February 2019, Liu was loaned to League One side Guangdong South China Tiger for the 2019 season.

On 15 January 2023, Liu officially announced his retirement from professional football.

== Manager career ==
On 10 March 2025, Liu was appointed as the head coach of China League One club Jiangxi Dingnan United. On 13 December 2025, the club annouanced Liu's departure at the end of 2025 season.

On 14 December 2025, Liu was appointed as the head coach of Chinese Super League club Chongqing Tonglianglong.

== International career ==
Liu made his debut for the China national team on 18 July 2009 in a 3-1 win against Palestine. He soon was called up to the squad that won the 2010 East Asian Football Championship before he was called up to China's squad for the 2011 AFC Asian Cup in December 2010.

== Career statistics ==
Statistics accurate as of match played 31 December 2020.

Appearances and goals by club, season and competition
Club	Season	League			National Cup		League Cup		Continental		Other		Total	
Club	Season	Division	Apps	Goals	Apps	Goals	Apps	Goals	Apps	Goals	Apps	Goals	Apps	Goals
Changsha Ginde	2005	Chinese Super League	19	2		0		0	-		-		19	2
Changsha Ginde	2006	Chinese Super League	25	2	1	0	-		-		-		26	2
Changsha Ginde	2007	Chinese Super League	26	2	-		-		-		-		26	2
Changsha Ginde	2008	Chinese Super League	26	2	-		-		-		-		26	2
Changsha Ginde	2009	Chinese Super League	29	3	-		-		-		-		29	3
Changsha Ginde	2010	Chinese Super League	27	3	-		-		-		-		27	3
Changsha Ginde	Total		152	14	1	0	0	0	0	0	0	0	153	14
Jiangsu Suning	2011	Chinese Super League	28	0	0	0	-		-		-		28	0
Jiangsu Suning	2012	Chinese Super League	28	0	1	0	-		-		-		29	0
Jiangsu Suning	2013	Chinese Super League	28	1	2	1	-		6	1	1 (Note: Appearances in Chinese FA Super Cup)	0	37	3
Jiangsu Suning	2014	Chinese Super League	29	1	7	0	-		-		-		36	1
Jiangsu Suning	2015	Chinese Super League	25	0	5	0	-		-		-		30	0
Jiangsu Suning	2016	Chinese Super League	19	0	5	0	-		4	0	0	0	28	0
Jiangsu Suning	2017	Chinese Super League	17	0	3	0	-		6	0	0	0	26	0
Jiangsu Suning	2018	Chinese Super League	3	0	1	0	-		-		-		4	0
Jiangsu Suning	Total		177	2	24	1	0	0	16	1	1	0	218	4
Guangdong South China Tiger (loan)	2019	China League One	27	0	0	0	-		-		-		27	0
Taizhou Yuanda (loan)	2020	China League One	11	0	0	0	-		-		-		11	0
Career total			367	16	25	1	0	0	16	1	1	0	409	18

== Honours ==
=== Club ===
Jiangsu Sainty

- Chinese FA Super Cup: 2013
- Chinese FA Cup: 2015

=== International ===
China PR national football team

- East Asian Football Championship: 2010
