= Sun Ke (footballer) =

Chinese footballer

Sun Ke 孙可
Personal information
- Full name: Sun Ke
- Date of birth: 26 August 1989 (age 37)
- Place of birth: Xuzhou, Jiangsu, China
- Height: 1.80 m (5 ft 11 in)
- Position: Winger

Senior career*
Years	Team	Apps	(Gls)
2006–2015	Jiangsu Sainty	167	(18)
2016–2019	Tianjin Tianhai	92	(18)
2020–2022	Shenzhen FC	33	(1)

International career
2013–2016	China	33	(7)
Medal record
Representing China
Men's football
EAFF Championship
Silver medal – second place	2013 South Korea	Team
Silver medal – second place	2015 China	Team
- * Club domestic league appearances and goals

Sun Ke (Chinese: 孙可; pinyin: Sūn Kě; Mandarin pronunciation: [swə́n.kʰɤ̀]; born 26 August 1989) is a Chinese former professional footballer as a winger.

== Club career ==
Sun Ke started his football career playing for second-tier side Jiangsu Sainty in 2006. By the 2008 season, he would play in 22 league games and score two goals as he was part of the team that won the second-tier league title and promotion to the top flight. Within the top tier, Sun found it hard to gain significant playing time until the 2011 season when he started to establish himself as a regular for the first team which soon culminated in his first goal in over two years when he scored on 14 September 2011 in a 2–0 win against Hangzhou Greentown.

On 18 June 2015, Sun transferred to fellow Chinese Super League side Tianjin Teda. However, due to complications with the club's sponsor Quanjian, the transfer was suddenly put on hold and Sun returned to Jiangsu. By 12 January 2016, Quanjian had left their sponsorship with Tianjin Teda and moved it to Tianjin Quanjian, which saw Sun transferred to China League One side Tianjin Quanjian for a record-breaking domestic transfer fee of an estimated ¥66 million. He made his debut and scored his first goal for the club on 13 March 2016 in a 3–0 win against Qingdao Huanghai. He immediately established himself as a vital member of the team as they won the 2016 China League One division and promotion to the top tier.

In July 2020, Sun was one of eight former Tianjin Tianhai players to sign with Shenzhen FC. He would go on to make his debut for the club on 4 August 2020 in a league game against Guangzhou Evergrande Taobao F.C. that ended in a 3–1 defeat.

== International career ==
Sun was called up to the Chinese national team for the first time in March 2013. He made his debut on 22 March 2013 in a 1–0 win against Iraq during 2015 AFC Asian Cup qualification. He scored a dramatic game-tying goal on 21 July 2013 in a 3–3 draw against Japan at the 2013 EAFF East Asian Cup.

On 24 December 2014, Sun was named in China's squad for the 2015 AFC Asian Cup in Australia. In the team's second group match, he scored the winning goal as China won 2–1 against Uzbekistan to qualify for the knockout stage.

== Career statistics ==
=== Club statistics ===
As of 31 December 2022.

Appearances and goals by club, season and competition
Club	Season	League			National Cup		Continental		Other		Total	
Club	Season	Division	Apps	Goals	Apps	Goals	Apps	Goals	Apps	Goals	Apps	Goals
Jiangsu Sainty	2006	China League One	0	0	0	0	-		-		0	0
Jiangsu Sainty	2007	China League One	0	0	-		-		-		0	0
Jiangsu Sainty	2008	China League One	22	2	-		-		-		22	2
Jiangsu Sainty	2009	Chinese Super League	10	0	-		-		-		10	0
Jiangsu Sainty	2010	Chinese Super League	8	0	-		-		-		8	0
Jiangsu Sainty	2011	Chinese Super League	29	3	0	0	-		-		29	3
Jiangsu Sainty	2012	Chinese Super League	26	3	1	0	-		-		27	3
Jiangsu Sainty	2013	Chinese Super League	24	4	2	0	6	1	1 (Note: Appearances in Chinese FA Super Cup)	0	33	5
Jiangsu Sainty	2014	Chinese Super League	26	2	7	4	-		-		33	6
Jiangsu Sainty	2015	Chinese Super League	22	4	5	1	-		-		27	5
Jiangsu Sainty	Total		167	18	15	5	6	1	1	0	189	24
Tianjin Tianhai	2016	China League One	25	8	1	0	-		-		26	8
Tianjin Tianhai	2017	Chinese Super League	26	5	3	0	-		-		29	5
Tianjin Tianhai	2018	Chinese Super League	23	3	2	0	8	1	-		33	4
Tianjin Tianhai	2019	Chinese Super League	18	2	3	0	-		-		21	2
Tianjin Tianhai	Total		92	18	9	0	8	1	0	0	109	19
Shenzhen	2020	Chinese Super League	6	0	1	0	-		-		7	0
Shenzhen	2021	Chinese Super League	11	1	4	3	-		-		15	4
Shenzhen	2022	Chinese Super League	16	0	0	0	-		-		16	0
Shenzhen	Total		33	1	5	3	0	0	0	0	38	4
Career total			292	37	29	8	14	2	1	0	336	47

=== International statistics ===
National team
Year	Apps	Goals
2013	11	3
2014	11	1
2015	8	3
2016	3	0
Total	33	7

=== International goals ===
As of 18 January 2015
Scores and results list China's goal tally first.

No	Date	Venue	Opponent	Score	Result	Competition
1.	21 July 2013	Seoul World Cup Stadium, Seoul, South Korea	Japan	3–3	3–3	2013 EAFF East Asian Cup
2.	28 July 2013	Olympic Stadium, Songpa-gu, South Korea	Australia	2–1	4–3	2013 EAFF East Asian Cup
3.	6 September 2013	Olympic Stadium, Tianjin, China	Singapore	4–1	6–1	Friendly
4.	10 October 2014	Wuhan Sports Center Stadium, Wuhan, China	Thailand	2–0	3–0	Friendly
5.	14 January 2015	Brisbane Stadium, Brisbane, Australia	Uzbekistan	2–1	2–1	2015 AFC Asian Cup
6.	18 January 2015	Canberra Stadium, Canberra, Australia	North Korea	1–0	2–1	2015 AFC Asian Cup
7.	18 January 2015	Canberra Stadium, Canberra, Australia	North Korea	2–0	2–1	2015 AFC Asian Cup

== Honours ==
Jiangsu Sainty

- China League One: 2008
- Chinese FA Super Cup: 2013
- Chinese FA Cup: 2015

Tianjin Quanjian

- China League One: 2016
