= Ge Wei =

Chinese footballer

Ge Wei 戈伟
Personal information
- Date of birth: September 9, 1989 (age 37)
- Place of birth: Nanjing, Jiangsu, China
- Height: 2.00 m (6 ft 6 1/2 in)
- Position: Striker

Youth career
- 2004–2008: Jiangsu Sainty

Senior career*
Years	Team	Apps	(Gls)
2008–2018	Jiangsu Suning	46	(2)
2014	→ Jiangxi Liansheng (loan)	16	(3)
2019–2020	Taizhou Yuanda	44	(19)
2021-2022	Nanjing City	33	(3)
2022	→ Ji'nan Xingzhou (loan)	3	(1)
- * Club domestic league appearances and goals as of 7 November 2020

Ge Wei (Chinese: 戈伟; born September 9, 1989, in Nanjing) is a retired Chinese football player.

== Club career ==
Ge was promoted to Jiangsu Sainty's first team squad in 2008 but didn't have a chance to appear in the senior team until he made his debut in a league game on 26 May 2010 in a 1–0 home win over Tianjin Teda. He would soon score his first senior league goal on his fourth appearance when he scored in 77th minute to ensure Jiangsu beat Nanchang Hengyuan 1-0 at home win on 24 July. On 24 September, he suffered a cruciate ligament damage in his right knee in a league match which Jiangsu Sainty played against Hangzhou Greentown, ruling him out for the rest of the season. He was sent to the reserve team in 2018.

On 24 January 2019, Ge transferred to League Two newcomer Taizhou Yuanda.

== Career statistics ==
Statistics accurate as of match played 28 November 2020.

Appearances and goals by club, season and competition
Club	Season	League			National Cup		Continental		Other		Total	
Club	Season	Division	Apps	Goals	Apps	Goals	Apps	Goals	Apps	Goals	Apps	Goals
Jiangsu Sainty	2008	China League One	0	0	-		-		-		0	0
Jiangsu Sainty	2009	Chinese Super League	0	0	-		-		-		0	0
Jiangsu Sainty	2010	Chinese Super League	13	1	-		-		-		13	1
Jiangsu Sainty	2011	Chinese Super League	3	0	0	0	-		-		3	0
Jiangsu Sainty	2012	Chinese Super League	2	0	0	0	-		-		2	0
Jiangsu Sainty	2013	Chinese Super League	7	0	0	0	2	0	0	0	9	0
Jiangsu Sainty	2015	Chinese Super League	9	1	2	0	-		-		11	1
Jiangsu Sainty	2016	Chinese Super League	4	0	3	1	1	0	0	0	8	1
Jiangsu Sainty	2017	Chinese Super League	8	0	1	0	5	0	1 (Note: Appearances in Chinese FA Super Cup)	0	15	0
Jiangsu Sainty	Total		46	2	6	1	8	0	1	0	61	3
Jiangxi Liansheng (loan)	2014	China League Two	16	3	1	0	-		-		17	3
Taizhou Yuanda	2019	China League Two	34	18	5	2	-		-		39	20
Taizhou Yuanda	2020	China League One	10	1	1	0	-		-		11	1
Taizhou Yuanda	Total		44	19	6	2	0	0	0	0	50	21
Career total			106	23	13	3	8	0	1	0	129	27

== Honours ==
=== Club ===
Jiangxi Liansheng

- China League Two: 2014

Jiangsu Sainty

- Chinese FA Cup: 2015
