= 2016 Chinese FA Cup =

2016 The Chinese Football Association Cup
CFA Cup
- CFA Cup 60th anniversary logo

Tournament details
- Country: China
- Dates: 8 January–27 November 2016
- Teams: 64

Final positions
- Champions: Guangzhou Evergrande Taobao (2nd title)
- Runners-up: Jiangsu Suning
- AFC Champions League: Guangzhou Evergrande Taobao

Tournament statistics
- Matches played: 70
- Goals scored: 182 (2.6 per match)
- Top goal scorer(s): (Nigeria) Obafemi Martins (Israel) Eran Zahavi (Brazil) Alex Teixeira (6 goals)

Awards
- Best player: (Colombia) Roger Martínez

Yanjing Beer 2016 Chinese FA Cup (Chinese: 燕京啤酒2016中国足球协会杯) was the 18th edition of the Chinese FA Cup and the 60th anniversary of the Chinese National Cup. Guangzhou Evergrande Taobao beat the defending champions Jiangsu Suning on away goals in the final to win their second title.

== Schedule ==
Round	Date	Clubs remaining	Clubs involved	Winners from previous round	New entries this round	New Entries Notes
Qualifying round	8–10 January	72	16	none	16	16 Local amateur league teams
First round	19–20 March; 26–27 March	64	32	8	24	16 China League Two teams (2015 China League One relegated teams & 2015 China League Two 3–16 teams); 8 2015 China Amateur Football League top-8 teams (Note: Four teams (Suzhou Dongwu, Hainan Boying Seamen, Shenzhen Renren and Shenyang City) would play in the 2016 China League Two.)
Second round	12–14 April	48	32	16	16	16 China League One teams (2015 China League Two promoted teams & 2015 China League One 3–14 teams & 2015 Chinese Super League relegated teams)
Third round	10–12 May	32	32	16	16	16 Chinese Super League teams (2 2015 China League One promoted teams & 2015 Chinese Super League 1–14 teams)
Fourth round	28–30 June	16	16	16	none	
Fifth round	12–14 July; 26–28 July	8	8	8	none	
Semi-Finals	16–18 August; 20–22 September	4	4	4	none	
Finals	20 November; 27 November	2	2	2	none	

== Home Advantage Decision ==
According to Chinese FA Cup Procedure, In each round, home team advantages are decided as follows.

Rounds	Rules
1st Round	According to FA Cup draw.
2nd Round	The team which had a lower standing in 2015 season decides whether they play at home.
3rd Round	The team which had a lower standing in 2015 season decides whether they play at home.
4th Round	The team which had a lower standing in 2015 season decides whether they play at home.
5th Round	The team which had a higher standing in 2015 season will hold the 1st leg and the other team hold the 2nd leg.
Semi-Finals	The team which had a higher standing in 2015 season will hold the 1st leg and the other team hold the 2nd leg.
Finals	The team which had a higher standing in 2015 season will hold the 1st leg and the other team hold the 2nd leg.

== Qualifying rounds ==
=== Group A ===
Team	Pld	W	D	L	GF	GA	GD	Pts
Suzhou Zhongyuan	3	2	1	0	6	4	+2	7
Nanjing Gold	3	1	2	0	5	3	+2	5
Wuhan Dongfeng Honda	3	1	1	1	5	4	+1	4
Changchun Chengye	3	0	0	3	2	7	−5	0

8 January	Wuhan Dongfeng Honda (A)	1–1	Nanjing Gold (A)	Gaoming Memorial Middle School, Foshan
9:30	He Dexin 84'		Huang Yi 68'	Referee: Mu Yuchen

8 January	Changchun Chengye (A)	1–2	Suzhou Zhongyuan (A)	Gaoming Cangjiang Middle School, Foshan
9:30	Wen Long 82'		Fu Rong 35'; Huang Chen 71'	Referee: Liang Caiwei

9 January	Nanjing Gold (A)	3–1	Changchun Chengye (A)	Gaoming Memorial Middle School, Foshan
9:30	She Chao 17', 33'; Chen Fanxing 56'		Liu Ye 22' (pen.)	Referee: Chen Hao

9 January	Suzhou Zhongyuan (A)	3–2	Wuhan Dongfeng Honda (A)	Gaoming Cangjiang Middle School, Foshan
9:30	Huang Chen 4'; Li Xia 61', 82'		Xu Peng 33'; Xiao Zhilei 76'	Referee: Liang Songshang

10 January	Suzhou Zhongyuan (A)	1–1	Nanjing Gold (A)	Gaoming Memorial Middle School, Foshan
8:30	Yu Xiao 44'		Shao Yuxiang 47'	Referee: Ruan Hua

10 January	Wuhan Dongfeng Honda (A)	2–0	Changchun Chengye (A)	Gaoming Cangjiang Middle School, Foshan
8:30	Wan Peng 6'; Liu Jingke 27'			Referee: Li Sicheng

=== Group B ===
Team	Pld	W	D	L	GF	GA	GD	Pts
Ningbo Yinbo	3	2	1	0	8	3	+5	7
Guangzhou Haoxin	3	2	0	1	5	6	−1	6
Sichuan Jiujiuai	3	1	1	1	7	3	+4	4
Chengdu Hi-Tech Zhonghe United	3	0	0	3	2	10	−8	0

8 January	Ningbo Yinbo (A)	2–0	Chengdu Hi-Tech Zhonghe United (A)	Gaoming Memorial Middle School, Foshan
13:00	Zeng Yan 46', 56'			Referee: He Kai

8 January	Guangzhou Haoxin (A)	1–0	Sichuan Jiujiuai (A)	Gaoming Cangjiang Middle School, Foshan
13:00	Diao Binbin 75'			Referee: Ma Ye

9 January	Chengdu Hi-Tech Zhonghe United (A)	2–3	Guangzhou Haoxin (A)	Gaoming Memorial Middle School, Foshan
13:00	Wei Mingheng 20'; Xian Xiaolong 79'		Li Qiang 53'; Zhu Haiqiang 70'; Wu Haiqing 89' (pen.)	Referee: Huang Xiang

9 January	Sichuan Jiujiuai (A)	2–2	Ningbo Yinbo (A)	Gaoming Cangjiang Middle School, Foshan
13:00	Ruan Jun 31'; Liao Wenyan 32'		Liu Zhengjun 45'; Wu Xiaoli 50'	Referee: Shan Dan'ao

10 January	Sichuan Jiujiuai (A)	5–0	Chengdu Hi-Tech Zhonghe United (A)	Gaoming Memorial Middle School, Foshan
10:30	Liao Wenyan 16'; Li Jiawei 45+1'; Li Endian 55', 83'; Ruan Jun 77'			Referee: Xu Qiangqiang

10 January	Ningbo Yinbo (A)	4–1	Guangzhou Haoxin (A)	Gaoming Cangjiang Middle School, Foshan
10:30	Zhang Lei 4' (pen.); Chen Hao 80', 83'; Liu Zhengjun 85'		Wu Haiqing 86'	Referee: Mu Yuchen

=== Group C ===
Team	Pld	W	D	L	GF	GA	GD	Pts
Zhaoqing Hengtai	3	3	0	0	13	2	+11	9
Dalian Shengwei	3	2	0	1	5	5	0	6
Zibo Zhangdian Iron & Steel	3	1	0	2	3	9	−6	3
Hubei Huachuang	3	0	0	3	2	7	−5	0

8 January	Zhaoqing Hengtai (A)	6–1	Zibo Zhangdian Iron & Steel (A)	Gaoming Memorial Middle School, Foshan
15:00	Xu Dexin 21', 87'; Lin Leiyi 23'; Lin Zhaoming 34', 47' (pen.); Cai Haojian 36'		Yuan Bo 7'	Referee: Xia Jun

8 January	Hubei Huachuang (A)	1–2	Dalian Shengwei (A)	Gaoming Cangjiang Middle School, Foshan
15:00	Liu Bo 90+3'		Liu Zhiqiang 21'; Wang Zhendong 66'	Referee: Chen Xin

9 January	Zibo Zhangdian Iron & Steel (A)	1–0	Hubei Huachuang (A)	Gaoming Memorial Middle School, Foshan
15:00	Li Song 35'			Referee: Ma Ye

9 January	Dalian Shengwei (A)	0–3	Zhaoqing Hengtai (A)	Gaoming Cangjiang Middle School, Foshan
15:00			Liang Weijie 24'; Lin Zhaoming 47'; Xu Dexin 55'	Referee: Dong Kun

10 January	Dalian Shengwei (A)	3–1	Zibo Zhangdian Iron & Steel (A)	Gaoming Memorial Middle School, Foshan
13:30	Liu Zhiqiang 65', 90', 90+2'		Yuan Bo 80'	Referee: Chen Xin

10 January	Zhaoqing Hengtai (A)	4–1	Hubei Huachuang (A)	Gaoming Cangjiang Middle School, Foshan
13:30	Cai Haojian 10'; Cheng Lu 15'; Lin Leiyi 35'; Tan Zhenyu 56'			Referee: Zhang Haijun

=== Group D ===
Team	Pld	W	D	L	GF	GA	GD	Pts
Shanghai Jiading Boo King	3	2	1	0	12	3	+9	7
Qingdao Kunpeng	3	2	1	0	9	5	+4	7
Guilin Tianlong	3	1	0	2	1	9	−8	3
Chongqing High Wave	3	0	0	3	2	7	−5	0

8 January	Qingdao Kunpeng (A)	2–0	Guilin Tianlong (A)	Gaoming Sports Centre Stadium, Foshan
13:00	Tian Yong 35'; Ning Hao 70'			Referee: Jia Zhiliang

8 January	Shanghai Jiading Boo King (A)	2–0	Chongqing High Wave (A)	Gaoming Sports Centre Stadium, Foshan
15:00	Jiang Weiliang 60'; Shen Longyuan 81'			Referee: Dong Kun

9 January	Guilin Tianlong (A)	0–7	Shanghai Jiading Boo King (A)	Gaoming Sports Centre Stadium, Foshan
13:00			Jiang Weiliang 10', 35', 41'; Zhou Jun 25'; Sun Yue 37'; Xu Bin 80'; Shen Longyuan 87'	Referee: Wang Jing

9 January	Chongqing High Wave (A)	2–4	Qingdao Kunpeng (A)	Gaoming Sports Centre Stadium, Foshan
15:00	Yuan Xin 83', 90+3'		Ning Hao 12', 35'; Ma Jun 88', 90+2'	Referee: Li Haixin

10 January	Chongqing High Wave (A)	0–1	Guilin Tianlong (A)	Gaoming Memorial Middle School, Foshan
15:30			Wang Yichuan 30'

10 January	Qingdao Kunpeng (A)	3–3	Shanghai Jiading Boo King (A)	Gaoming Cangjiang Middle School, Foshan
15:30	Ma Jun 20', 29', 41'		Shen Longyuan 35', 58'; Xu Dan 79'	Referee: Wang Jing

== First round ==
19 March	Shanghai Jiading Boo King (A)	1–0	Ningbo Yinbo (A)	Jiading Stadium, Shanghai
15:00	Yun Jianwei 5'			Attendance: 329; Referee: Xu Fuxin

19 March	Liuzhou Ranko (A)	0–2	Shanghai JuJu Sports (3)	Liuzhou Sports Centre, Liuzhou
15:00			Wu Haitian 3'; Wang Junchao 42' (pen.)	Attendance: 22,115; Referee: Wang Zhe

19 March	Zhaoqing Hengtai (A)	2–0	Suzhou Zhongyuan (A)	Guangdong Provincial People's Stadium, Guangzhou
15:00	Yang Xichang 39'; Lin Zhaoming 81'			Attendance: 288; Referee: Tang Kun

19 March	Jiangxi Liansheng (3)	0–1	Shenyang Urban (3)	Jiujiang Stadium, Jiujiang
15:00			Liu Le 38'	Attendance: 7,685; Referee: Zhong Jiawei

19 March	Suzhou Dongwu (3)	0–0 (4–3 p)	Baotou Nanjiao (3)	Soochow University East Campus Stadium, Suzhou
16:00				Attendance: 1,656; Referee: Zhang Xiaochen
	Penalties
	Sun Hong (penalty missed); Wu Hongyang (penalty scored); Song Yue (penalty scored); Yu Zengpin (penalty scored); Wang Feng (penalty scored)		(penalty missed) Parhat; (penalty missed) Chen Chengye; (penalty scored) He Zitong; (penalty scored) Sun Xiaolin; (penalty scored) Yin Liangyi

19 March	Hebei Elite (3)	2–3	Dalian Boyang (A)	Hongta Sports Training Base 4th Field, Kunming
16:00	Zhang Jiawei 47'; He Wei 59'		Xu Xin 53', 84'; Wang Xin 62' (pen.)	Attendance: 315; Referee: Liu Xiufeng

19 March	Hainan Boying & Seamen (3)	0–0 (4–2 p)	Jiangsu Yancheng Dingli (3)	Hainan Sport School Stadium, Haikou
19:45				Attendance: 5,119; Referee: Ma Ye
	Penalties
	Yu Chennan (penalty scored); Zhang Kaiming (penalty scored); Xue Chen (penalty scored); Jiang Weipeng (penalty scored)		(penalty scored) Dong Xiang; (penalty missed) Xu Zheming; (penalty scored) Han Cai; (penalty missed) Yang Wanshun

20 March	Chengdu Qbao (3)	3–0	Dalian Shengwei (A)	Dujiangyan Phoenix Stadium, Dujiangyan
15:00	Zi Long 44'; Gan Rui 60', 73'			Attendance: 1,080; Referee: Yang Kaizi

26 March	Heilongjiang Lava Spring (3)	2–1	Tianjin Huochetou (3)	Heilongjiang Institute of Technology Stadium, Harbin
14:00	Wang Yunlong 45+3'; Wang Ziming 90+2'		Fang Jianyu 90+3'	Attendance: 1,616; Referee: Yang Nan

26 March	Qingdao Kunpeng (A)	3–0	Nanjing Gold (A)	Tiantai Stadium, Qingdao
15:00	Ma Jun 7'; Tian Yong 45+2', 85'			Attendance: 2,235; Referee: Jin Jingyuan

26 March	Guangzhou Haoxin (A)	2–2 (5–4 p)	Shenyang Dongjin (3)	Wuchuan Sports Centre Stadium, Wuchuan
15:00	Zhu Haiqiang 72', 90+2'		Diao Binbin 47' (o.g.); Guo Zihao 60'	Attendance: 3,989; Referee: Liu Zhao

26 March	Baoding Yingli ETS (3)	2–2 (4–3 p)	Nantong Zhiyun (3)	Baoding People's Stadium, Baoding
15:00	Di You 66'; Liu Xiaodong 89'		Wang Si 8'; Lian Renjie 62'	Attendance: 2,315; Referee: Liang Caiwei
	Penalties
	Li Yan (penalty scored); Du Junpeng (penalty scored); Li Xiang (penalty missed); Su Junfeng (penalty scored); Sun Fabo (penalty scored)		(penalty scored) Wang Kai; (penalty scored) Chen Zheng; (penalty missed) Li Jiawei; (penalty missed) Lian Renjie; (penalty scored) Wang Si

26 March	Shanxi Longcheng Zhisheng (A)	0–2	Lijiang Jiayunhao (3)	Shanxi Sports Centre Stadium, Taiyuan
15:00			Jiang Zhongxiao 6'; Zhang Shuoke 61'	Attendance: 9,878; Referee: Wang Wei

27 March	Wuhan Hongxing Bairun (A)	1–1 (3–2 p)	Sichuan Longfor (3)	Hankou Cultural Sports Centre, Wuhan
15:00	Huang Lei 61'		Gong Liangxuan 28'	Attendance: 7,813; Referee: Jia Zhiliang
	Penalties
	Hu Hao (penalty scored); Deng Sheng (penalty scored); Wang Kai (penalty scored); Zhou Yi (penalty missed)		(penalty scored) Zhu Chaoqing; (penalty scored) Gan Yingbo; (penalty missed) Liu Zhongyi; (penalty missed) Chen Shaoqin; (penalty missed) Gong Liangxuan

27 March	Shenzhen Renren (3)	1–2	Yinchuan Helanshan (3)	Bao'an Stadium, Shenzhen
15:30	Yang Bin 47'		Gao Wanguo 5'; Tan Tiancheng 11'	Attendance: 6,198; Referee: Li Zheng

27 March	Meixian Hakka (3)	1–0	Beijing Institute of Technology (3)	Meixian Tsang Hin-chi Stadium, Meizhou
16:00	Hou Zhe 65'			Attendance: 3,328; Referee: Wan Tao

== Second round ==
12 April	Qingdao Kunpeng (A)	0–1	Beijing BG (2)	Tiantai Stadium, Qingdao
15:00			Chen Hao-wei 9'	Attendance: 1,021; Referee: Dong Kun

12 April	Guangzhou Haoxin (A)	0–0 (5–3 p)	Guizhou Hengfeng Zhicheng (2)	Wuchuan Sports Centre Stadium, Wuchuan
15:00				Attendance: 5,028; Referee: Yang Kaizi
	Penalties
	(penalty scored) (penalty scored) (penalty scored) (penalty scored); Huang Nanfu (penalty scored)		(penalty scored) (penalty scored) (penalty scored); (penalty missed) Zhang Mengqi

12 April	Dalian Boyang (A)	1–0	Hunan Billows Hualai (2)	Jinzhou Stadium, Dalian
15:00	Wang Shixin 5'			Attendance: 201; Referee: Wang Wei

12 April	Zhaoqing Hengtai (A)	1–5	Meizhou Hakka (2)	Guangdong Provincial People's Stadium, Guangzhou
15:00	Li Zhihai 25'		Yu Jianfeng 1', 26' (pen.), 55'; Dogan 59'; Xue Ouyang 74'	Attendance: 550; Referee: Zhou Gang

12 April	Shenyang Urban (3)	1–1 (1–4 p)	Shanghai Shenxin (2)	Shenyang Urban Construction University Stadium, Shenyang
15:00	Yang Jian 75'		Liu Junnan 45'	Attendance: 2,016; Referee: Xu Fuxin

12 April	Yinchuan Helanshan (3)	1–2	Beijing Renhe (2)	Helan Mountain Stadium, Yinchuan
15:30	Li Bin 47'		Han Peng 1'; Xiang Hantian 50'	Attendance: 5,182; Referee: Liu Wei

12 April	Meizhou Meixian Hakka (3)	0–1	Nei Mongol Zhongyou (2)	Meixian Tsang Hin-chi Stadium, Meizhou
16:00			Nizamdin 35'	Attendance: 535; Referee: Guo Hao

12 April	Shanghai Jiading Boo King (A)	1–0	Zhejiang Yiteng (2)	Jiading Stadium, Shanghai
19:00	Jiang Weiliang 72'			Attendance: 2,780; Referee: Liu Xiufeng

12 April	Suzhou Dongwu (3)	0–1	Tianjin Quanjian (2)	Kunshan Stadium, Kunshan
19:30			Zhang Shuo 24'	Attendance: 4,862; Referee: Liu Lin

13 April	Shanghai JuJu Sports (3)	0–1	Xinjiang Tianshan Leopard (2)	Jinshan Sports Centre (Outfield), Shanghai
15:00			Cai Xi 24'	Referee: Kou Jianxun

13 April	Heilongjiang Lava Spring (3)	0–3	Qingdao Jonoon (2)	Jinzhou Stadium, Dalian
15:00			Sun Jiangshan 46'; Zhong Yihao 68'; Wang Xiufu 79'	Attendance: 108; Referee: Liu Zhao

13 April	Lijiang Jiayunhao (3)	2–1	Qingdao Huanghai (2)	Lijiang Sports Development Centre Stadium, Lijiang
15:00	Zhang Shuoke 33'; Men Yang 40'		Wang Xuanhong 88'	Attendance: 3,168; Referee: Zhong Jiawei

13 April	Baoding Yingli ETS (3)	0–2	Dalian Yifang (2)	Baoding People's Stadium, Baoding
15:30			Zhang Hui 53'; Zhao Xuebin 76'	Attendance: 2,568; Referee: Li Zheng

13 April	Hainan Boying & Seamen (3)	3–0	Shenzhen FC (2)	Hainan Sport School Stadium, Haikou
16:00	Xue Chen 13', 90'; Wang Qi 76'			Attendance: 2,116; Referee: Wang Dang

13 April	Chengdu Qbao (3)	3–0	Dalian Transcendence (2)	Dujiangyan Phoenix Stadium, Dujiangyan
16:00	Xia Jin 21'; Liu Yingchen 50' (o.g.); Tan Si 86'			Attendance: 358; Referee: Chen Xin

14 April	Wuhan Hongxing Bairun (A)	1–0	Wuhan Zall (2)	Hankou Cultural Sports Centre, Wuhan
15:30	Peng Junxiong 10'			Attendance: 6,813; Referee: Xing Qi

== Third round ==
10 May	Hainan Boying & Seamen (3)	1–1 (3–4 p)	Guangzhou R&F (1)	Hainan Sport School Stadium, Haikou
16:30	Wang Qi 73'		Tang Miao 90'	Referee: Liu Xiufeng
	Penalties
	Pan Chaoran (penalty scored); Zhang Kaiming (penalty scored); Wang Haoyi (penalty missed); Jiang Weipeng (penalty scored); Li Xincheng (penalty missed)		(penalty scored) Zhang Chenlong; (penalty scored) Wang Song; (penalty scored) Lu Lin; (penalty missed) Chen Zhizhao; (penalty scored) Xiao Zhi

10 May	Shanghai Jiading Boo King (A)	0–1	Hebei CFFC (1)	Jiading Stadium, Shanghai
19:35			Du Wei 90+4' (pen.)	Attendance: 3,780; Referee: Yu Bo

11 May	Guangzhou Haoxin (A)	1–7	Tianjin Teda (1)	Wuchuan Sports Centre Stadium, Wuchuan
15:00	Wu Haiqing 71' (pen.)		Qu Bo 13', 16'; Mao Biao 26', 55', 67'; Wang Xinxin 43' (pen.); Wang Qiuming 65'	Attendance: 4,589; Referee: Chen Xin

11 May	Wuhan Hongxing Bairun (A)	0–3; Awarded (Note: Chinese Football Association awarded Jiangsu a 3–0 win as a result of the players and staff of Wuhan Hongxing attacked and injured the players of Jiangsu after the match, and Wuhan Hongxing used ineligible players to play in the match. The match originally ended 1–0 to Jiangsu.)	Jiangsu Suning (1)	Hankou Cultural Sports Centre, Wuhan
15:00			Ge Wei 90+7'	Attendance: 7,315; Referee: Kou Jianxun

11 May	Lijiang Jiayunhao (3)	1–1 (5–4 p)	Yanbian Funde (1)	Lijiang Sports Development Centre Stadium, Lijiang
15:00	Gao Furong 4'		Han Guanghui 60'	Attendance: 2,308; Referee: Li Haixin
	Penalties
	Cai Chuchuan (penalty scored); Wang Kun (penalty missed); Hui Ge (penalty scored); Gao Furong (penalty scored); Ha Zhaotong (penalty scored); Zheng Jie (penalty scored)		(penalty scored) Han Guanghui; (penalty scored) Exmetjan; (penalty missed) Li Xun; (penalty scored) Jin Bo; (penalty scored) Chi Zhongguo; (penalty missed) Wang Zhipeng

11 May	Beijing Renhe (2)	0–1	Shijiazhuang Ever Bright (1)	Beijing Fengtai Stadium, Beijing
15:30			Lü Jianjun 20'	Attendance: 1,340; Referee: Guo Hao

11 May	Dalian Yifang (2)	2–2 (2–4 p)	Henan Jianye (1)	Dalian Sports Center Stadium, Dalian
15:30	Zhao Xuebin 13'; Bangura 40'		Mirahmetjan 18', 45'	Attendance: 2,016; Referee: Shen Yinhao
	Penalties
	Bangura (penalty scored); Cui Ming'an (penalty missed); Zhao Xuebin (penalty scored); Wu Yuyin (penalty missed)		(penalty scored) Ivo; (penalty missed) Yin Hongbo; (penalty scored) Mirahmetjan; (penalty scored) Sow; (penalty scored) Gomes

11 May	Chengdu Qbao (3)	1–3	Liaoning FC (1)	Dujiangyan Phoenix Stadium, Dujiangyan
16:00	Tan Si 89'		Wang Hao 1'; Feng Boyuan 45+1'; Zhang Jingyang 74'	Attendance: 638; Referee: Xu Fuxin

11 May	Beijing BG (2)	0–1	Shanghai SIPG (1)	Olympic Sports Centre, Beijing
18:00			Wu Lei 86'	Attendance: 3,686; Referee: Zhang Long

11 May	Tianjin Quanjian (2)	4–0	Chongqing Lifan (1)	Haihe Educational Football Stadium, Tianjin
19:35	Zhao Xuri 40'; Geuvânio 64'; Luís Fabiano 83'; Zheng Dalun 90'			Attendance: 6,359; Referee: Gu Chunhan

11 May	Meizhou Hakka (2)	0–3	Shandong Luneng Taishan (1)	Wuhua County Stadium, Wuhua
19:35			Liu Binbin 3'; Aloísio 45+2'; Li Wei 66'	Attendance: 8,649; Referee: Wu Liying

11 May	Shanghai Shenxin (2)	0–0 (10–9 p)	Changchun Yatai (1)	Jinshan Sports Centre, Shanghai
19:35				Attendance: 660; Referee: Luo Haitao
	Penalties
	Ji Jun (penalty scored); Xu Wen (penalty scored); Zhang Yudong (penalty scored); Jia Tianzi (penalty scored); Sun Kai (penalty scored); Gu Bin (penalty scored); Huang Wei (penalty scored); Liu Junnan (penalty scored); Hu Yongfa (penalty scored); Sun Yifan (penalty scored)		(penalty scored) He Chao; (penalty scored) Yang He; (penalty scored) Yaki Yen; (penalty scored) Sealy; (penalty scored) Li Shang; (penalty scored) Liu Qiming; (penalty scored) Zhou Dadi; (penalty scored) Shao Shuai; (penalty scored) Cao Ziheng; (penalty missed) Wu Yake

11 May	Nei Mongol Zhongyou (2)	0–2	Guangzhou Evergrande Taobao (1)	Hohhot City Stadium, Hohhot
20:00			Yu Hanchao 83'; Alan 90+2'	Attendance: 31,283; Referee: Ma Li

11 May	Xinjiang Tianshan Leopard (2)	0–3	Beijing Guoan (1)	Xinjiang Sports Centre, Urumqi
20:00			Krimets 59'; Renato Augusto 84'; Du Mingyang 90+3'	Attendance: 10,235; Referee: Chen Gang

11 May	Shanghai Greenland Shenhua (1)	5–0	Qingdao Jonoon (2)	Hongkou Football Stadium, Shanghai (Note: Qingdao Jonoon abdicated to play at their home stadium.)
20:00	Ba 14', 39'; Guarín 50'; Martins 56' (pen.), 72'			Attendance: 18,253; Referee: Liu Lin

12 May	Dalian Boyang (A)	0–1	Hangzhou Greentown (1)	Jinzhou Stadium, Dalian
15:00			Luo Jing 74'	Attendance: 625; Referee: Tang Kun

== Fourth round ==
28 June	Tianjin Teda (1)	0–3	Guangzhou Evergrande Taobao (1)	Tianjin Olympic Center Stadium, Tianjin
19:35			Alan 36', 61'; Liu Jian 40'	Attendance: 10,056; Referee: Zhao Zhizhi

28 June	Shanghai Shenxin (2)	0–3	Jiangsu Suning (1)	Jinshan Sports Centre, Shanghai
19:35			Ramires 47'; Jô 87'; Wu Xi 89'	Attendance: 4,632; Referee: Zhou Gang

28 June	Henan Jianye (1)	6–1	Lijiang Jiayunhao (3)	Hanghai Stadium, Zhengzhou (Note: Lijiang Jiayunhao abdicated to play at their home stadium.)
19:35	Yin Hongbo 13', 35', 52' (pen.), 88'; Liang Yu 39'; Zhang Shuai 85'		Gao Furong 43'	Attendance: 6,679; Referee: Zhang Long

29 June	Guangzhou R&F (1)	1–0	Shanghai SIPG (1)	Yuexiushan Stadium, Guangzhou
19:35	Giannou 62'			Attendance: 7,086; Referee: Wang Jing

29 June	Hebei CFFC (1)	3–2	Shijiazhuang Ever Bright (1)	Qinhuangdao Olympic Sports Center Stadium, Qinhuangdao
19:35	Zhang Lifeng 13'; Du Wei 19'; Gui Hong 31'		Mendy 26', 41'	Attendance: 8,168; Referee: Huang Yejun

29 June	Hangzhou Greentown (1)	1–3	Beijing Guoan (1)	Yellow Dragon Sports Center, Hangzhou
19:35	Chen Po-liang 87'		Zhang Chiming 48', 70'; Renato Augusto 66'	Attendance: 5,185; Referee: Dong Kun

29 June	Shanghai Greenland Shenhua (1)	1–0	Shandong Luneng Taishan (1)	Hongkou Football Stadium, Shanghai
19:35	Moreno 79'			Attendance: 19,356; Referee: Wang Zhe

29 June	Tianjin Quanjian (2)	3–1	Liaoning FC (1)	Haihe Educational Football Stadium, Tianjin
19:35	Li Xingcan 20'; Huang Long 54'; Zheng Dalun 77'		Wang Liang 85'	Attendance: 7,887; Referee: Shi Zhenlu

== Fifth round ==
=== 1st leg ===
13 July	Guangzhou R&F (1)	3–0	Hebei CFFC (1)	Yuexiushan Stadium, Guangzhou
19:00	Zahavi 61', 78', 81' (pen.)			Attendance: 7,033; Referee: Tan Hai

13 July	Shanghai Greenland Shenhua (1)	4–0	Tianjin Quanjian (2)	Hongkou Football Stadium, Shanghai
19:35	Cao Yunding 12'; Martins 56', 82'; Ba 75'			Attendance: 17,723; Referee: Wang Jing

13 July	Henan Jianye (1)	2–1	Jiangsu Suning (1)	Hanghai Stadium, Zhengzhou
19:35	Patiño 41'; Ivo 54'		Teixeira 82' (pen.)	Attendance: 13,133; Referee: Wang Zhe

13 July	Guangzhou Evergrande Taobao (1)	2–1	Beijing Guoan (1)	Tianhe Stadium, Guangzhou
20:00	Gao Lin 9', 38'		Mei Fang 27' (o.g.)	Attendance: 44,612; Referee: He Xiaohu

=== 2nd leg ===
26 July	Beijing Guoan (1)	1–2	Guangzhou Evergrande Taobao (1)	Workers' Stadium, Beijing
19:35	Yu Dabao 24'		Paulinho 36'; Gao Lin 47'	Attendance: 41,663; Referee: Wang Di

Guangzhou Evergrande Taobao won 4–2 on aggregate.

27 July	Hebei CFFC (1)	1–2	Guangzhou R&F (1)	Qinhuangdao Olympic Sports Center Stadium, Qinhuangdao
19:35	Mbia 89' (pen.)		Zahavi 43' (pen.); Lu Lin 83'	Attendance: 5,317; Referee: Ai Kun

Guangzhou R&F won 5–1 on aggregate.

27 July	Tianjin Quanjian (2)	0–1	Shanghai Greenland Shenhua (1)	Haihe Educational Football Stadium, Tianjin
19:35			Gao Di 10'	Attendance: 4,287; Referee: Gu Chunhan

Shanghai Greenland Shenhua won 5–0 on aggregate.

27 July	Jiangsu Suning (1)	3–1 (a.e.t.)	Henan Jianye (1)	Changzhou Olympic Sports Center, Changzhou
19:35	Teixeira 13', 69'; Ji Xiang 109'		Ivo 50'	Attendance: 30,706; Referee: Lin Jun

Jiangsu Suning won 4–3 on aggregate.

== Semi-finals ==
=== 1st leg ===
17 August	Guangzhou Evergrande Taobao (1)	2–2	Guangzhou R&F (1)	Tianhe Stadium, Guangzhou
19:35	Goulart 26', 88'		Xiao Zhi 21'; Zahavi 51'	Attendance: 33,849; Referee: Ai Kun

17 August	Shanghai Greenland Shenhua (1)	2–3	Jiangsu Suning (1)	Hongkou Football Stadium, Shanghai
19:35	Martins 21', 90+3'		Teixeira 54', 80'; Wu Xi 55'	Attendance: 23,848; Referee: Huang Yejun

=== 2nd leg ===
21 September	Guangzhou R&F (1)	1–3	Guangzhou Evergrande Taobao (1)	Yuexiushan Stadium, Guangzhou
19:35	Zahavi 85'		Paulinho 8'; Goulart 67' (pen.); Alan 70'	Attendance: 13,989; Referee: Zhao Zhizhi

Guangzhou Evergrande Taobao won 5–3 on aggregate.

21 September	Jiangsu Suning (1)	1–0	Shanghai Greenland Shenhua (1)	Nanjing Olympic Sports Centre, Nanjing
19:35	Wu Xi 76'			Attendance: 45,729; Referee: Zhou Gang

Jiangsu Suning won 4–2 on aggregate.

== Final ==
=== 1st leg ===
20 November
19:35

Guangzhou Evergrande Taobao (1)	1–1	Jiangsu Suning (1)
Goulart 9'		Teixeira 64'

Tianhe Stadium, Guangzhou
Attendance: 48,562
Referee: Huang Yejun

Guangzhou	Jiangsu

GK	32	(China) Liu Dianzuo
RB	5	(China) Zhang Linpeng
CB	3	(China) Mei Fang	(yellow card) 85'
CB	35	(China) Li Xuepeng	(yellow card) 15'
LB	25	(China) Zou Zheng	(yellow card) 90'	(substituted off) 90'
DM	8	(Brazil) Paulinho
DM	10	(China) Zheng Zhi (c)
AM	11	(Brazil) Ricardo Goulart
RW	16	(China) Huang Bowen	(yellow card) 23'	(substituted off) 69'
LW	7	(Brazil) Alan Carvalho
CF	29	(China) Gao Lin		(substituted off) 74'
Substitutes:
GK	13	(China) Fang Jingqi
DF	12	(China) Wang Shangyuan
DF	37	(China) Chen Zepeng		(substituted on) 90'
MF	2	(China) Liao Lisheng
MF	4	(China) Xu Xin
MF	20	(China) Yu Hanchao		(substituted on) 69'
MF	27	(China) Zheng Long		(substituted on) 74'
Coach:
(Brazil) Luiz Felipe Scolari

GK	1	(China) Gu Chao
RB	24	(China) Ji Xiang		(substituted off) 71'
CB	5	(China) Zhou Yun
CB	6	(Australia) Trent Sainsbury
CB	2	(China) Li Ang
LB	28	(China) Yang Xiaotian
DM	7	(Brazil) Ramires
CM	11	(China) Xie Pengfei		(substituted off) 46'
CM	22	(China) Wu Xi (c)	(yellow card) 19'	(substituted off) 87'
SS	10	(Brazil) Alex Teixeira
ST	38	(Colombia) Roger Martínez	(yellow card) 60'
Substitutes:
GK	30	(China) Zhang Sipeng
DF	26	(South Korea) Hong Jeong-ho
MF	8	(China) Liu Jianye		(substituted on) 87'
MF	12	(China) Zhang Xiaobin	(yellow card) 57'	(substituted on) 46'
MF	13	(China) Tao Yuan		(substituted on) 71'
MF	33	(China) Gu Wenxiang
FW	40	(China) Ge Wei
Coach:
(South Korea) Choi Yong-soo

Assistant referees:
Song Xiangyun
Zhang Qiangjing
Fourth official:
Fan Qi

=== 2nd leg ===
27 November
19:00

Jiangsu Suning (1)	2–2	Guangzhou Evergrande Taobao (1)
Martínez 7', 73'		Paulinho 45+2'; Huang Bowen 81'

Nanjing Olympic Sports Centre, Nanjing
Attendance: 58,331
Referee: Jansen Foo (Singapore)

Jiangsu	Guangzhou

GK	1	(China) Gu Chao
RB	24	(China) Ji Xiang		(substituted off) 84'
CB	5	(China) Zhou Yun	(yellow card) 42'
CB	6	(Australia) Trent Sainsbury
CB	2	(China) Li Ang	(yellow card) 63'
LB	28	(China) Yang Xiaotian	(yellow card) 90+8'
DM	7	(Brazil) Ramires
CM	11	(China) Xie Pengfei		(substituted off) 46'
CM	22	(China) Wu Xi (c)		(substituted off) 87'
SS	10	(Brazil) Alex Teixeira
ST	38	(Colombia) Roger Martínez
Substitutes:
GK	25	(China) Jiang Hao
DF	26	(South Korea) Hong Jeong-ho
MF	8	(China) Liu Jianye
MF	12	(China) Zhang Xiaobin		(substituted on) 46'
MF	13	(China) Tao Yuan		(substituted on) 84'
MF	33	(China) Gu Wenxiang
FW	40	(China) Ge Wei		(substituted on) 87'
Coach:
(South Korea) Choi Yong-soo

GK	32	(China) Liu Dianzuo
RB	5	(China) Zhang Linpeng
CB	3	(China) Mei Fang
CB	6	(China) Feng Xiaoting
LB	35	(China) Li Xuepeng
DM	8	(Brazil) Paulinho
DM	10	(China) Zheng Zhi (c)	(yellow card) 57'	(substituted off) 68'
AM	11	(Brazil) Ricardo Goulart
RW	2	(China) Liao Lisheng		(substituted off) 46'
LW	27	(China) Zheng Long		(substituted off) 75'
CF	7	(Brazil) Alan Carvalho
Substitutes:
GK	13	(China) Fang Jingqi
DF	12	(China) Wang Shangyuan
DF	25	(China) Zou Zheng
MF	4	(China) Xu Xin
MF	16	(China) Huang Bowen		(substituted on) 68'
MF	20	(China) Yu Hanchao		(substituted on) 75'
FW	29	(China) Gao Lin		(substituted on) 46'
Coach:
(Brazil) Luiz Felipe Scolari

Assistant referees:
Lim Kok Heng (Singapore)
Ronnie Koh Min Kiat (Singapore)
Fourth official:
Tan Hai

3–3 on aggregate. Guangzhou Evergrande Taobao won on away goals.

== Wuhan Hongxing–Jiangsu Suning brawl incident ==
On 11 May 2016, an on-field brawl occurred in the third-round game of FA Cup between amateur club Wuhan Hongxing and first tier club Jiangsu Suning. Jiangsu's striker Ge Wei scored in the 7th minute of stoppage time as Jiangsu edged Wuhan Hongxing 1–0 and advanced to the next round. Players and staff of Wuhan Hongxing lost control and attacked their counterparts following the final whistle. Jiangsu's Xie Pengfei was hit onto the ground by several Wuhan players, while scorer Ge Wei was injured on his rib; many other Jiangsu's players also suffered injuries in the melee. Some reporters from Jiangsu were also assaulted in the incident. Jiangsu's staff Wu Bo, who was recording the match, was beaten up by a group of unidentified people.

Jiangsu Suning left Wuhan on a high-speed train immediately after the match. The officials of Wuhan Hongxing condemned the brawl and vowed to punish the players involved later that day. They also emphasized that the cause of the brawl could not ascribed to Wuhan only as they believed the goal celebration of Jiangsu was a deliberate provocation. On 12 May 2016, Wuhan Hongxing issued an apology to Jiangsu and announced that five players who were involved the brawl had been sacked by the club. However, Wuhan was exposed to use ineligible players in the match on the same day.

On 20 May 2016, the Chinese Football Association published the survey results and punishments. Jiangsu was awarded a 3–0 win. Wuhan Hongxing Bairun F.C. was fined 200,000 RMB and banned from all future matches organised by the Chinese Football Association. Six players and two staff of Wuhan received a life ban from football, four players of Wuhan received a 36-month ban from football and ten players of Wuhan received a 24-month ban from football.

== Awards ==
- Top Scorer(s):
  (Nigeria) Obafemi Martins (Shanghai Greenland Shenhua)
  (Israel) Eran Zahavi (Guangzhou R&F)
  (Brazil) Alex Teixeira (Jiangsu Suning) (6 goals)
- Most Valuable Player: (Colombia) Roger Martínez (Jiangsu Suning)
- Best Coach: (Brazil) Luiz Felipe Scolari (Guangzhou Evergrande Taobao)
- Fair Play Award: Guangzhou R&F
- Dark Horse Award: Tianjin Quanjian

== Top scorers ==
Rank	Player	Club	Goals
1	(Nigeria) Obafemi Martins	Shanghai Greenland Shenhua	6
1	(Israel) Eran Zahavi	Guangzhou R&F	6
1	(Brazil) Alex Teixeira	Jiangsu Suning	6
4	(China) Yin Hongbo	Henan Jianye	4
4	(Brazil) Alan Carvalho	Guangzhou Evergrande Taobao	4
4	(Brazil) Ricardo Goulart	Guangzhou Evergrande Taobao	4
7	(Senegal) Demba Ba	Shanghai Greenland Shenhua	3
7	(China) Mao Biao	Tianjin TEDA	3
7	(China) Gao Lin	Guangzhou Evergrande Taobao	3
7	(China) Yu Jianfeng	Meizhou Hakka	3
7	(China) Wu Xi	Jiangsu Suning	3
7	(Brazil) Paulinho	Guangzhou Evergrande Taobao	3
