= Gláucio =

Gláucio may refer to:

- Gláucio (footballer, born 1975), Brazilian football striker Gláucio de Jesus Carvalho
- Gláucio (footballer, born 1994), Brazilian football forward Gláucio Jose de Araujo Silva
- Gláucio Carvalho (born 1968), Brazilian football coach

== See also ==
- Gllawcyo (born 1995), Brazilian football midfielder, pronounced Gláucio
