= Leonardo (footballer, born October 1992) =

Brazilian footballer (born 1992)

Personal information
- Full name: Leonardo Benedito da Silva
- Date of birth: 22 October 1992 (age 34)
- Place of birth: Pirassununga, Brazil
- Height: 1.86 m (6 ft 1 in)
- Position: Striker

Team information
- Current team: Ningbo FC

Senior career*
Years	Team	Apps	(Gls)
2011	CAP Uberlândia		
2012	Pirassununguense	6	(0)
2013	Castelo		
2013	União Barbarense	0	(0)
2013–2014	Pirassununguense		
2015	Matonense	9	(1)
2015	Boa Esporte	1	(0)
2015	São Bernardo	0	(0)
2016	Guarani-SC	12	(1)
2016	São Carlos	0	(0)
2017	Olímpia	2	(0)
2017–2018	Nacional-SP	12	(2)
2018	→ Novoperário (loan)	8	(2)
2019	Al-Shabab		
2019–2020	Xinjiang Tianshan Leopard	7	(5)
2020–2021	Chengdu Better City	49	(15)
2022	Chongqing Liangjiang Athletic	0	(0)
2022–2023	Nagoya Grampus	12	(0)
2023	Fujieda MYFC	4	(0)
2024	Suzhou Dongwu	30	(17)
2025	Chongqing Tonglianglong	22	(2)
2026–	Ningbo FC	0	(0)
- * Club domestic league appearances and goals as of 8 November 2025

Leonardo Benedito da Silva (born 22 October 1992), commonly known as Leonardo or Naldinho, is a Brazilian footballer who currently plays as a striker for China League One club Ningbo FC.

== Club career ==
Naldinho would move to China on 26 July 2019 to join second tier football club Xinjiang Tianshan Leopard. He would make his debut in a league game on 4 August 2019 against Liaoning F.C. where he also scored his first goal for the club in a 1-1 draw. The following season he would join another second tier club in Chengdu Rongcheng where after two seasons with the club he would establish himself as a regular within the team and aid them to promotion at the end of the 2021 league campaign.

On 30 April 2022, Naldinho joined Chinese Super League club Chongqing Liangjiang Athletic. The club was dissolved on 24 May 2022.

On 1 July 2022, Naldinho joined J1 League club Nagoya Grampus.

On 7 August 2023, Nagoya Grampus announced that Naldinho would be transferring to J2 League club Fujieda MYFC.

On 28 February 2024, Naldinho returned to China and signed a with China League One club Suzhou Dongwu.

On 11 February 2026, Cittadini joined China League One club Ningbo FC.

== Career statistics ==
As of match played 8 November 2025.

Appearances and goals by club, season and competition
Club	Season	League			State League		Cup		League Cup		Other		Total	
Club	Season	Division	Apps	Goals	Apps	Goals	Apps	Goals	Apps	Goals	Apps	Goals	Apps	Goals
Pirassununguense	2012	—			6 (Note: Appearances in the Campeonato Paulista Segunda Divisão)	0	0	0	—		0	0	6	0
União Barbarense	2013	—			0	0	0	0	—		3 (Note: Appearances in the Copa Paulista)	0	6	0
Matonense	2015	—			9 (Note: Appearances in the Campeonato Paulista A2)	1	0	0	—		0	0	9	1
Boa Esporte	2015	Série B	1	0	0	0	0	0	—		0	0	1	0
São Bernardo	2015	—			0	0	0	0	—		9	1	9	1
Guarani-SC	2016	—			12 (Note: Appearances in the Campeonato Catarinense)	1	0	0	—		0	0	12	1
São Carlos	2016	—			0	0	0	0	—		7	1	7	1
Olímpia	2017	—			2 (Note: Appearances in the Campeonato Paulista A3)	0	0	0	—		0	0	2	0
Nacional-SP	2017	—			0	0	0	0	—		13	2	13	2
Nacional-SP	2018	—			12	2	0	0	—		11	1	23	3
Nacional-SP	Total		0	0	12	2	0	0	—		24	3	36	5
Novoperário (loan)	2018	Série D	8	2	0	0	0	0	—		0	0	8	2
Xinjiang Tianshan Leopard	2019	China League One	7	5	—		0	0	—		—		7	5
Chengdu Better City	2020	China League One	14	1	—		1 (Note: Appearances in the Chinese FA Cup)	0	—		—		15	1
Chengdu Better City	2021	China League One	33	14	—		1	1	—		2 (Note: Appearance(s) in CSL Relegation play-offs)	0	36	15
Chengdu Better City	Total		47	15	—		2	1	—		2	0	51	16
Nagoya Grampus	2022	J1 League	9	0	—		0 (Note: Appearances in the Emperor's Cup)	0	0 (Note: Appearances in the J. League Cup)	0	—		9	0
Nagoya Grampus	2023	J1 League	3	0	—		1	0	3	0	—		7	0
Nagoya Grampus	Total		12	0	—		1	0	3	0	—		16	0
Fujieda MYFC	2023	J2 League	4	0	—		—		—		—		4	0
Suzhou Dongwu	2024	China League One	30	17	—		1	0	—		—		31	17
Chongqing Tonglianglong	2025	China League One	22	2	—		0	0	—		—		22	2
Career total			131	41	41	4	4	1	3	0	45	5	224	51
