= Zhang Zili =

Chinese footballer (born 2002)

Personal information
- Date of birth: 23 January 2002 (age 24)
- Place of birth: Chengdu, Sichuan, China
- Height: 1.80 m (5 ft 11 in)
- Position: Midfielder

Team information
- Current team: Chengdu Rongcheng B
- Number: 7

Youth career
- 2012–2021: Evergrande Football School

Senior career*
Years	Team	Apps	(Gls)
2021–2024	Guangzhou FC	24	(0)
2024	→ Haikou Mingcheng (loan)	26	(4)
2025	Guangxi Pingguo	8	(0)
2026–	Chengdu Rongcheng B	0	(0)
- * Club domestic league appearances and goals as of 21:58, 8 March 2026 (UTC)

Zhang Zili (Chinese: 张子立; born 23 January 2002) is a Chinese footballer currently playing as a midfielder for China League Two club Chengdu Rongcheng B.

== Career ==
=== Guangzhou ===
Born in Chengdu in the Sichuan province of China, Zhang did not have a particular interest in football as a child, but would follow his father to watch him play. He joined the Evergrande Football School in 2012, at the age of ten, but initially struggled to settle, and his father would travel to visit him in order to help. In 2016 he travelled with other students to Spain as part of the Evergrande Spanish Football School programme, where he helped his side win the Madrid Coslada Cup. After winning the 2018 Madrid U16 Youth Cup, beating Atlético Madrid's Cadete B team in the final, he was named captain of the squad to represent the school in 2019.

Due to the effects of the COVID-19 pandemic in China, Guangzhou sent a squad of youth team players to represent them in the 2021 edition of the AFC Champions League. After making his professional debut in Guangzhou's 2–0 loss to Japanese club Cerezo Osaka on 24 June 2021, his handball in the match against Hong Kong's Kitchee six days later allowed Montenegrin striker Dejan Damjanović to score the game's only goal from the penalty spot.

After making a few appearances in the 2022 season, Zhang could not prevent the club from being relegated to the China League One. After a poor start to the 2023 season, he took to social media to apologise for his and the club's performances, also denying rumours of an internal rift at the club.

=== Guangxi Pingguo ===
Having spent the 2024 season on loan at China League Two club Haikou Mingcheng, Zhang joined Guangxi Pingguo in early 2025 after Guangzhou were disbanded following the expiration of his loan.

== Career statistics ==
=== Club ===
As of 20 June 2025.

Appearances and goals by club, season and competition
Club	Season	League			Cup (Note: Includes Chinese FA Cup)		Continental		Other		Total	
Club	Season	Division	Apps	Goals	Apps	Goals	Apps	Goals	Apps	Goals	Apps	Goals
Guangzhou	2021	Chinese Super League	0	0	0	0	6 (Note: Appearances in the AFC Champions League)	0	0	0	6	0
Guangzhou	2022	Chinese Super League	9	0	1	0	0	0	0	0	10	0
Guangzhou	2023	China League One	15	0	2	0	–		0	0	17	0
Guangzhou	2024	China League One	0	0	0	0	–		0	0	0	0
Guangzhou	Total		24	0	3	0	6	0	0	0	33	0
Haikou Mingcheng (loan)	2024	China League Two	26	4	1	0	–		0	0	27	4
Guangxi Pingguo	2025	China League One	8	0	1	0	–		0	0	9	0
Career total			58	4	5	0	6	0	0	0	69	4
