= Fagner =

Fagner may refer to:

- Raimundo Fagner (born 1949), Brazilian singer, composer, musician, actor and music producer
- Fágner (footballer, born 1988), Brazilian football forward
- Fagner (footballer, born 1988), Brazilian football midfielder
- Fagner (footballer, born 1989), Brazilian football right-back
