= Giovanny =

Giovanny may refer to:

- Giovanny (footballer), Brazilian footballer
- Giovanny Gallegos
- Giovanny Hernández
