= Mao Weijie =

Chinese footballer (born 2005)

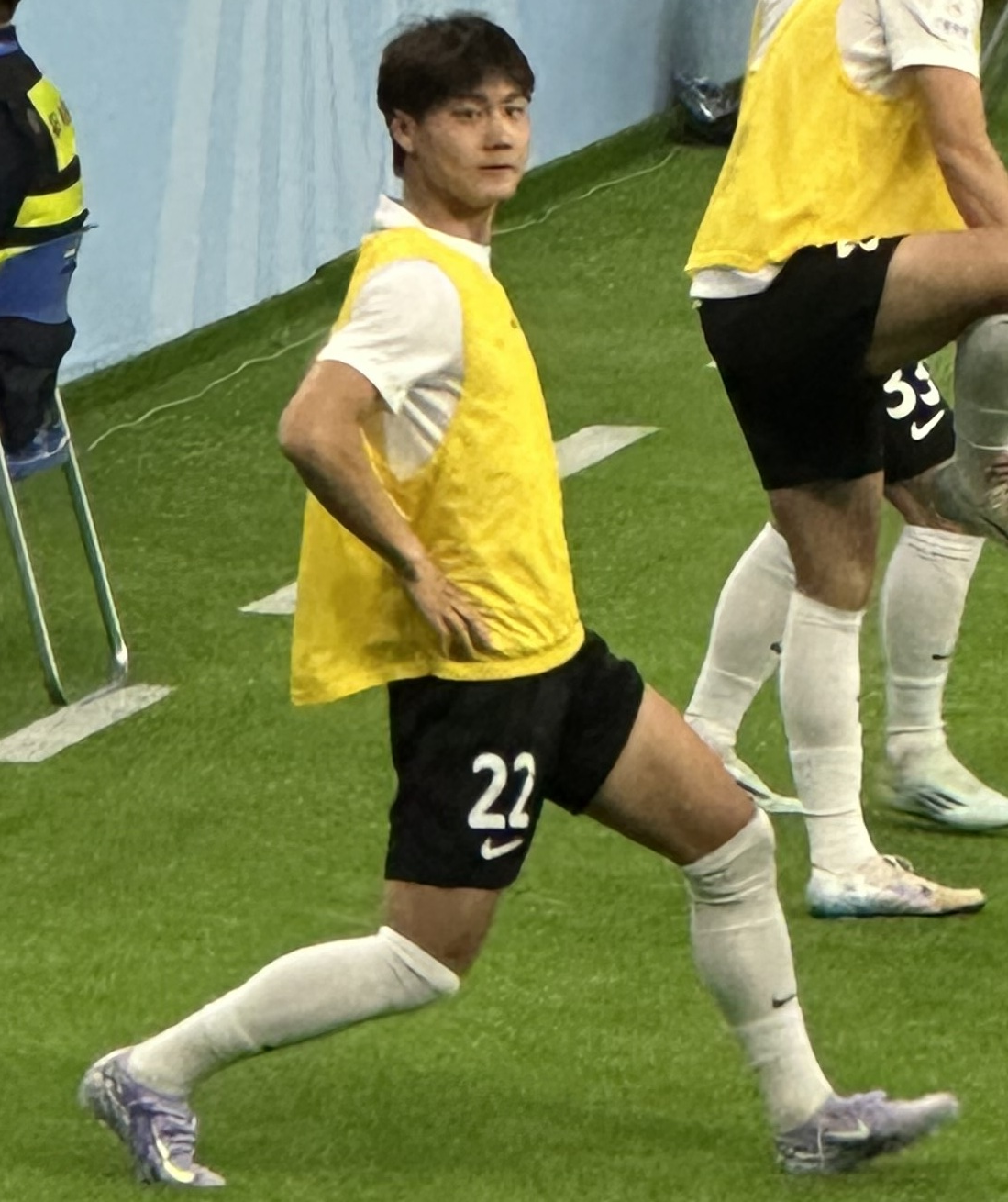
- Mao Weijie in April 2025

Personal information
- Full name: Mao Weijie
- Date of birth: 28 May 2005 (age 21)
- Place of birth: Wafangdian, Liaoning, China
- Height: 1.75 m (5 ft 9 in)
- Positions: Right winger; Right Midfielder Left Back

Team information
- Current team: Dalian Yingbo
- Number: 22

Senior career*
Years	Team	Apps	(Gls)
2022–	Dalian Yingbo	93	(6)

International career^{‡}
2024–2025	China U20	10	(2)
2025–	China U22	5	(0)
2026–	China	2	(0)
Medal record
Representing China
AFC U-23 Asian Cup
Runner-up	2026 Saudi Arabia	Team
Asian Games
Bronze medal – third place	2026 Aichi–Nagoya	Team
- * Club domestic league appearances and goals as of 19 November 2026 ‡ National team caps and goals as of 15:13, 5 June 2026 (UTC)

Mao Weijie (Chinese: 毛伟杰; born 28 May 2005) is a Chinese professional footballer who plays as a midfielder for Dalian Yingbo in the Chinese Super League and the China national team. He is known to having progressed through the Dalian youth system before making his professional debut in 2022.

== Early life ==
Mao Weijie was born in Wafangdian, a county-level city under the administration of Dalian, Liaoning Province. He began playing football in elementary school and started formal training under coach Ji Xuemin in fifth grade. By sixth grade, he moved to Dalian to attend Gan Jingzi Sports School, where he further developed his skills. He later joined the Dalian Football Association's youth system and signed with Dalian Zhixing (now Dalian Yingbo) in 2022.

== Club career ==
Mao made his professional debut in 2022 with Dalian Zhixing in China League Two. He helped the team achieve promotion to China League One in 2023. In the 2024 season, he contributed 3 goals and 2 assists in 28 appearances for Dalian Yingbo, aiding their promotion to the Chinese Super League. His performance against Liaoning Tieren, where he scored a volley, earned him the Man of the Match award.

== International career ==
Mao has been a member of the China U19 national team since 2024. He participated in the 2025 AFC U20 Asian Cup, scoring a goal and providing an assist in a 5-2 victory over Kyrgyzstan. He was called up to the senior China national team for a set of friendlies in June 2026.

== Career statistics ==
As of 3 November 2024

Club	Season	League			Cup		Continental		Other		Total	
Club	Season	Division	Apps	Goals	Apps	Goals	Apps	Goals	Apps	Goals	Apps	Goals
Dalian Yingbo	2022	Chinese Champions League	9	0	–		–		–		9	0
Dalian Yingbo	2023	China League Two	18	0	1	0	–		–		19	0
Dalian Yingbo	2024	China League One	28	3	1	0	–		–		29	0
Dalian Yingbo	2025	Chinese Super League	0	0	0	0	–		–		0	0
Dalian Yingbo	Total		55	3	2	0	0	0	0	0	57	3
Career total			55	3	2	0	0	0	0	0	57	3

== Honours ==
Dalian Yingbo

- Chinese Super League: 2026
