= Gaoming Sports Centre Stadium =

Multi-use stadium

- Location: Foshan, China
- Capacity: 8,000
- Surface: Grass

Construction
- Groundbreaking: 2012
- Opened: 2014

Gaoming Sports Centre Stadium (Chinese: 高明体育中心体育场) was a multi-use stadium in Gaoming District, Foshan, China. It was used mostly for football matches and was used for the 2015 Chinese Women's FA Super Cup Final and 2016 Chinese FA Cup qualifying rounds. The stadium had a capacity of 8,000 people.
