= Huang Wei (footballer) =

Chinese footballer

Huang Wei 黃威
Personal information
- Date of birth: 29 October 1993 (age 33)
- Place of birth: Kunming, Yunnan, China
- Height: 1.89 m (6 ft 2 1/2 in)
- Position: Centre-back

Youth career
- 2006–2010: Chengdu Youth
- 2010–2012: FC Metz

Senior career*
| Years | Team | Apps | (Gls) |
| 2012–2013 | Mafra | 0 | (0) |
| 2013–2014 | Benfica B | 11 | (0) |
| 2014–2015 | Farense | 18 | (0) |
| 2015–2017 | Shanghai Shenxin | 20 | (0) |
| 2017–2018 | Leixões | 7 | (0) |
| 2018–2019 | Vitória Guimarães B | 1 | (0) |
| 2019 | → Sichuan Longfor (loan) | 9 | (0) |
| 2020–2023 | Beijing BSU | 8 | (2) |
| 2023 | Yanbian Longding | 6 | (0) |
| 2023 | Shijiazhuang Gongfu | 11 | (0) |
| 2024 | Nanjing City | 2 | (0) |
| 2024 | Foshan Nanshi | 10 | (0) |
| 2025 | Guangxi Pingguo | 20 | (1) |

International career
| 2011–2012 | China U20 | | |
| 2012–2014 | China U22 | | |
- * Club domestic league appearances and goals as of 16 March 2024

Huang Wei (Chinese: 黃威; pinyin: Huáng Wēi; born 29 October 1993) is a Chinese professional footballer.

== Club career ==
Huang Wei started his football career with FC Metz and joined C.D. Mafra in 2012 as a youth player. In January 2013, Huang moved to Benfica B after successfully passing his trial with the club. On 28 April 2013, he made his debut for the club against Arouca in a 1–1 draw. Afterwards, Huang played in every match for the club for the remainder of the 2012–13 season.

On 20 July 2014, Huang transferred to Segunda Liga side S.C. Farense. On 27 August 2014, he debuted for Farense in a 1–0 win against Oriental Lisboa.

On 27 February 2015, Huang transferred to Chinese Super League side Shanghai Shenxin. He made his debut for the club on 15 March 2015, playing the whole match in a 2–0 home loss against Shanghai SIPG. He played 13 league matches in the 2015 season; however, Shanghai Shenxin finished the bottom and relegated to the second tier.

Huang moved to LigaPro side Leixões on 7 July 2017. On 26 July 2018, he joined fellow LigaPro side Vitória Guimarães B, signing a two-year contract.

== Career statistics ==
Statistics accurate as of match played 16 March 2024.

Appearances and goals by club, season and competition
| Club | Season | League | | | National Cup | | League Cup | | Continental | | Total | |
| Club | Season | Division | Apps | Goals | Apps | Goals | Apps | Goals | Apps | Goals | Apps | Goals |
|---|---|---|---|---|---|---|---|---|---|---|---|---|
| Mafra | 2012–13 | Segunda Divisão | 0 | 0 | 0 | 0 | — | | — | | 0 | 0 |
| Benfica B | 2012–13 | Segunda Liga | 5 | 0 | 0 | 0 | — | | — | | 5 | 0 |
| Benfica B | 2013–14 | Segunda Liga | 6 | 0 | 0 | 0 | — | | — | | 6 | 0 |
| Benfica B | Total | | 11 | 0 | 0 | 0 | 0 | 0 | 0 | 0 | 11 | 0 |
| Farense | 2014–15 | Segunda Liga | 18 | 0 | 1 | 0 | — | | — | | 19 | 0 |
| Shanghai Shenxin | 2015 | Chinese Super League | 13 | 0 | 1 | 0 | — | | — | | 14 | 0 |
| Shanghai Shenxin | 2016 | China League One | 7 | 0 | 3 | 0 | — | | — | | 10 | 0 |
| Shanghai Shenxin | 2017 | China League One | 0 | 0 | 1 | 0 | — | | — | | 1 | 0 |
| Shanghai Shenxin | Total | | 20 | 0 | 5 | 0 | 0 | 0 | 0 | 0 | 25 | 0 |
| Leixões | 2017–18 | LigaPro | 7 | 0 | 2 | 0 | 1 | 0 | — | | 10 | 0 |
| Vitória Guimarães B | 2018–19 | LigaPro | 1 | 0 | 0 | 0 | 0 | 0 | — | | 1 | 0 |
| Sichuan Longfor (loan) | 2019 | China League One | 9 | 0 | 0 | 0 | — | | — | | 9 | 0 |
| Beijing BSU | 2020 | China League One | 8 | 2 | — | | — | | — | | 8 | 2 |
| Beijing BSU | 2022 | China League One | 31 | 3 | 0 | 0 | — | | — | | 31 | 3 |
| Beijing BSU | Total | | 39 | 5 | 0 | 0 | 0 | 0 | 0 | 0 | 39 | 5 |
| Yanbian Longding | 2023 | China League One | 6 | 0 | 1 | 0 | — | | — | | 7 | 0 |
| Shijiazhuang Gongfu | 2023 | China League One | 11 | 0 | — | | — | | — | | 11 | 0 |
| Nanjing City | 2024 | China League One | 2 | 0 | 0 | 0 | — | | — | | 2 | 0 |
| Foshan Nanshi | 2024 | China League One | 0 | 0 | 0 | 0 | — | | — | | 0 | 0 |
| Career total | | | 124 | 5 | 9 | 0 | 1 | 0 | 0 | 0 | 134 | 5 |
