= Wang Jinshuai =

Chinese footballer (born 2001)

Wang Jinshuai 王金帅
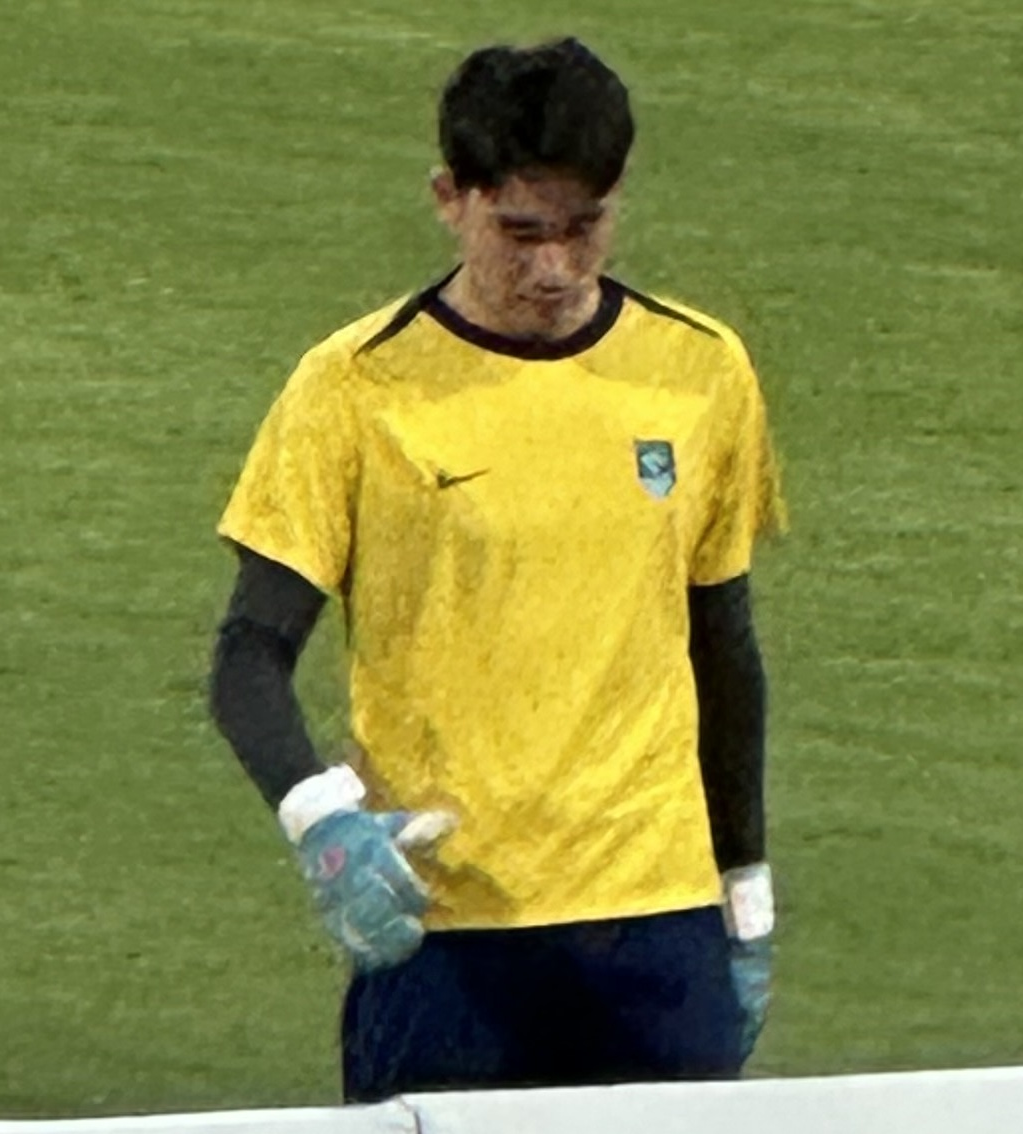
- Wang Jinshuai in May 2025

Personal information
- Date of birth: 9 January 2001 (age 25)
- Place of birth: Suihua, Heilongjiang, China
- Height: 1.88 m (6 ft 2 in)
- Position: Goalkeeper

Team information
- Current team: Henan FC
- Number: 17

Senior career*
Years	Team	Apps	(Gls)
2020–2023	Dalian Pro	4	(0)
2020	→ China U19 (loan)	6	(0)
2021	→ China U20 (loan)	10	(0)
2024–	Henan FC	5	(0)
2025	→ Nantong Zhiyun (loan)	0	(0)
2025	→ Guangxi Pingguo (loan)	9	(0)

International career
2022–2023	China U22		
- * Club domestic league appearances and goals as of 22 November 2026

Wang Jinshuai (Chinese: 王金帅; pinyin: Wáng Jīnshuài; born 9 January 2001) is a Chinese footballer who plays as a goalkeeper for Chinese Super League side Henan FC.

== Career ==
Wang Jinshuai would play for Dalian Yifang (now known as Dalian Pro) youth team and was promoted to their U19 team. To gain more playing time he would be loaned out to the China U19 team who were allowed to take part in the third tier of the Chinese pyramid. He would be loaned out again to the China U20 national team, who were allowed to play within the 2021 China League Two campaign. After his loan ended he would return to Dalian and go on to make his debut for them in a Chinese Super League game on 28 June 2022 against Guangzhou City in a game that ended in a 3-0 victory.

On 5 July 2025, Wang was loaned to China League One club Guangxi Pingguo.

== Career statistics ==
As of 1 March 2026.

Appearances and goals by club, season and competition
Club	Season	League			National cup		Continental		Other		Total	
Club	Season	Division	Apps	Goals	Apps	Goals	Apps	Goals	Apps	Goals	Apps	Goals
Dalian Pro	2020	Chinese Super League	0	0	0	0	-		-		0	0
Dalian Pro	2021	Chinese Super League	0	0	0	0	-		0 (Note: Appearance(s) in Promotion/Relegation Play-offs)	0	0	0
Dalian Pro	2022	Chinese Super League	4	0	0	0	-		-		4	0
Dalian Pro	2023	Chinese Super League	0	0	0	0	-		-		0	0
Dalian Pro	Total		4	0	0	0	0	0	0	0	4	0
China U19 (loan)	2020	China League Two	6	0	-		-		-		6	0
China U20 (loan)	2021	China League Two	10	0	0	0	-		-		10	0
Henan FC	2024	Chinese Super League	4	0	0	0	-		-		4	0
Henan FC	2026	Chinese Super League	0	0	0	0	-		-		0	0
Henan FC	Total		4	0	0	0	0	0	0	0	4	0
Nantong Zhiyun (loan)	2025	China League One	0	0	1	0	-		-		1	0
Guangxi Pingguo (loan)	2025	China League One	9	0	0	0	-		-		9	0
Career total			33	0	1	0	0	0	0	0	34	0
