= Giovanny (footballer) =

Brazilian footballer (born 1997)

Personal information
- Full name: Giovanny Bariani Marques
- Date of birth: 19 September 1997 (age 29)
- Place of birth: São Paulo, Brazil
- Height: 1.75 m (5 ft 9 in)
- Position: Forward

Team information
- Current team: Yanbian Longding
- Number: 37

Youth career
- 2013: União Suzano
- 2014: Lemense
- 2014: Corinthians

Senior career*
Years	Team	Apps	(Gls)
2015	Guaratinguetá	25	(10)
2015	→ Ponte Preta (loan)	0	(0)
2016–2020	Atlético Paranaense	28	(1)
2017	→ Paraná (loan)	5	(0)
2019	→ Goiás (loan)	10	(1)
2020–2022	Tombense	0	(0)
2020–2021	→ Guarani (loan)	34	(1)
2021	→ Náutico (loan)	32	(1)
2022	→ Santo André (loan)	7	(0)
2022–2023	Lokomotiv Plovdiv	46	(15)
2024	Guangxi Pingguo Haliao	29	(11)
2025	Juventude	25	(0)
2026–	Yanbian Longding	0	(0)

International career
2016-2017	Brazil U-20	9	(1)
- * Club domestic league appearances and goals as of 15 December 2025

Giovanny Bariani Marques (born 19 September 1997), simply known as Giovanny, is a Brazilian professional footballer who plays as a forward for China League One club Yanbian Longding.

== Career ==
On 1 January 2024, China League One club Guangxi Pingguo Haliao announced the signing of Giovanny.

== Career statistics ==
As of match played 7 December 2025

Appearances and goals by club, season and competition
Club	Season	League			State League		Cup		Continental		Other		Total	
Club	Season	Division	Apps	Goals	Apps	Goals	Apps	Goals	Apps	Goals	Apps	Goals	Apps	Goals
Guaratinguetá	2015	Série C	8	2	17	8	—		—		—		25	10
Ponte Preta (loan)	2015	Série A	0	0	—		—		—		—		0	0
Atlético Paranaense	2016	Série A	11	0	4	1	4	0	—		1	0	20	1
Atlético Paranaense	2018	Série A	—		8	0	0	0	—		—		8	0
Atlético Paranaense	Total		11	0	12	1	4	0	—		1	0	28	1
Paraná (loan)	2017	Série B	5	0	—		—		—		—		5	0
Goiás (loan)	2019	Série A	1	0	6	1	0	0	—		3	0	10	1
Guarani (loan)	2020	Série B	25	0	9	1	—		—		—		34	1
Náutico (loan)	2021	Série B	21	0	11	1	—		—		0	0	32	1
Santo André (loan)	2022	Série D	—		7	0	—		—		—		7	0
Lokomotiv Plovdiv	2022–23	Bulgarian First League	26	8	—		2	0	—		—		28	8
Lokomotiv Plovdiv	2023–24	Bulgarian First League	20	7	—		2	0	—		—		22	7
Lokomotiv Plovdiv	Total		46	15	—		4	0	—		—		50	15
Guangxi Pingguo Haliao	2024	China League One	29	11	—		2	4	—		—		31	15
Juventude	2025	Série A	19	0	6	0	1	0	—		—		26	0
Career total			165	28	68	12	11	4	0	0	4	0	248	44
