= Gllawcyo =

Brazilian footballer (born 1995)

Personal information
- Full name: Gllawcyo Anderson Costa Silva
- Date of birth: 17 October 1995 (age 31)
- Place of birth: Chapadinha, Maranhão, Brazil
- Height: 1.72 m (5 ft 8 in)
- Positions: Midfielder; winger

Youth career
- Ituano
- 2012: Pirassununguense
- 2014–2015: Santa Cruz

Senior career*
Years	Team	Apps	(Gls)
2015–2016	Santa Cruz	1	(0)
2015	→ Vitória das Tabocas (loan)		
2016	→ Serra Talhada (loan)		
2016	Itapirense		
2017	VOCEM	5	(0)
2018	Luminense		
2018	Itapirense		
Total		6	(0)
- * Club domestic league appearances and goals

Gllawcyo Anderson Costa Silva (born 17 October 1995), commonly known as Gllawcyo, is a Brazilian former footballer.

== Career ==
Gllawcyo was born in Chapadinha in the Brazilian state of Maranhão, and moved to São Paulo as a child to pursue a career in football. After spending time in the academy of Ituano, he began 2012 with Pirassununguense before moving to Pernambuco for a trial at Sport. He also spent time on trial at Porto de Caruaru, before settling at Santa Cruz.

He was promoted to the Santa Cruz first team in 2015 after impressive performances in the Copa São Paulo de Futebol Júnior, and featured in the club's friendly match against Latvian opposition FK Žalgiris, scoring a penalty in the 11–10 penalty shoot-out loss. Over the next two years, Gllawyco would fail to establish himself in the Santa Cruz first team, making just one appearance – in a 3–0 Campeonato Pernambucano loss to Serra Talhada – before being loaned out to Vitória das Tabocas and Serra Talhada in 2015 and 2016, respectively.

Following his departure from Santa Cruz, Gllawcyo had a short spell with Itapirense, and joined VOCEM for 2017 – though a serious injury suffered in July kept him out for the remainder of the year. A stint at Luminense in 2018 was followed by a return to Itapirense in the same year, before he retired from the game.

== Career statistics ==
=== Club ===
Appearances and goals by club, season and competition
Club	Season	League			State League		Cup		Other		Total	
Club	Season	Division	Apps	Goals	Apps	Goals	Apps	Goals	Apps	Goals	Apps	Goals
Santa Cruz	2015	Série B	0	0	1 (Note: Appearances in the Campeonato Pernambucano)	0	0	0	0	0	1	0
Santa Cruz	2016	Série A	0	0	0	0	0	0	0	0	0	0
Santa Cruz	Total		0	0	1	0	0	0	0	0	1	0
VOCEM	2017	–			5 (Note: Appearances in the Campeonato Paulista Série A4)	0	0	0	0	0	5	0
Career total			0	0	6	0	0	0	0	0	6	0
