= Fagner (footballer, born 1988) =

Brazilian footballer

Personal information
- Full name: Fagner Leite de Siqueira
- Date of birth: 10 September 1988 (age 38)
- Place of birth: Garanhuns, Brazil
- Height: 1.81 m (5 ft 11 1/2 in)
- Position: Midfielder

Youth career
- 2003: Paulista
- 2004: Juventus
- 2005: Pão de Açúcar
- 2006–2007: São Caetano

Senior career*
Years	Team	Apps	(Gls)
2008	Santa Cruz		
2009	América–RN		
2009–2010	Treze		
2010–2012	Batatais		
2011	→ Barretos (loan)		
2012	Pirassununguense		
2012	Barretos		
2013	Marília		
2013	Francana		
2014	Batatais		
2014–2016	Novorizontino		
2016	→ Linense (loan)	5	(0)
2016	→ Vila Nova (loan)	14	(0)
2017–2018	Vila Nova	7	(0)
2019	Botafogo PB	0	(0)
- * Club domestic league appearances and goals as of 23:22, 24 June 2019 (UTC)

Fagner Leite de Siqueira (born 10 September 1988), commonly known as Fagner, is a Brazilian footballer who plays as a midfielder.

== Career statistics ==
As of 9 January 2017

Club	Season	League			State League		Cup		Conmebol		Other		Total	
Club	Season	Division	Apps	Goals	Apps	Goals	Apps	Goals	Apps	Goals	Apps	Goals	Apps	Goals
América–RN	2009	Série B	—		6	0	—		—		—		6	0
Treze	2009	Série D	—		—		—		—		7 (Note: All appearance(s) in Copa Paraíba)	2	7	2
Treze	2010	Série D	—		6	1	1	0	—		—		7	1
Treze	Subtotal		—		6	1	1	0	—		7	2	14	3
Batatais	2010	Paulista A3	—		—		—		—		10 (Note: All appearance(s) in Copa Paulista)	0	10	0
Batatais	2011	Paulista A3	—		16	3	—		—		—		16	0
Batatais	2012	Paulista A3	—		13	0	—		—		—		13	0
Batatais	2014	Paulista A2	—		—		—		—		14	2	14	2
Batatais	Subtotal		—		29	3	—		—		24	2	53	5
Barretos	2011	Paulista B	—		26	1	—		—		—		26	1
Pirassununguense	2012	Paulista B	—		7	1	—		—		—		7	1
Barretos	2012	Paulista A3	—		—		—		—		3	0	3	0
Marília	2013	Paulista A3	—		13	0	—		—		—		13	0
Francana	2013	Paulista A3	—		—		—		—		3	0	3	0
Novorizontino	2014	Paulista A3	—		22	4	—		—		—		22	4
Novorizontino	2015	Paulista A2	—		4	0	—		—		—		4	0
Novorizontino	2016	Paulista	—		4	1	—		—		—		4	1
Novorizontino	Subtotal		—		30	5	—		—		—		30	5
Linense	2016	Série D	5	0	—		—		—		—		5	0
Vila Nova	2016	Série B	14	0	—		—		—		—		14	0
Career total			19	0	117	11	1	0	—		37	4	174	15
