= Shen Longyuan =

Chinese footballer

Shen Longyuan 沈龙元
Personal information
- Date of birth: March 2, 1985 (age 41)
- Place of birth: Shanghai, China
- Height: 1.77 m (5 ft 10 in)
- Position: Midfielder

Youth career
- 2000–2001: Shanghai 02
- 2002: Shanghai COSCO Huili
- 2003: Shanghai Shenhua

Senior career*
Years	Team	Apps	(Gls)
2004–2010	Shanghai Shenhua	69	(3)
2011	Hangzhou Greentown	21	(1)
2012–2013	Chongqing FC	40	(0)
2015	Shanghai Jiading Boo King		
2016–2017	Shanghai JuJu Sports	38	(6)
2018–2020	Taizhou Yuanda	32	(3)
2022	Rizhao Yuqi		

International career^{‡}
2006–2008	China U23	2	(0)
2008–2009	China	5	(0)
Medal record
Representing China
Men's football
AFC Youth Championship
Silver medal – second place	2004 َ Malaysia	Team
- * Club domestic league appearances and goals as of 24 May 2022 ‡ National team caps and goals as of 1 March 2010

Shen Longyuan (simplified Chinese: 沈龙元; traditional Chinese: 沈龍元; pinyin: Shěn Lóngyuán; born 2 March 1985 in Yangpu, Shanghai) is a Chinese former football player.

== Club career ==
Shen Longyuan started his professional football career in 2004 after he graduated from the Shanghai Shenhua youth team. He would make his league debut for Shenhua against Qingdao Zhongneng on October 23, 2004, coming on as a late substitute in a 1–0 defeat. After that defeat he would only play in one more league game throughout the season, however he would continue to establish himself the following seasons as a reliable squad regular within the team. By the 2006 league season he would gain more playing time and on September 9, 2006, Shen would go on to score his first league goal against Beijing Guoan in a 1–0 victory. With the introduction of Jia Xiuquan as manager during the 2008 league season Shen would actually start to become a permanent member of the first team, however this was out of position at full back during the absence of Sun Xiang. When Miroslav Blažević came in as manager at the beginning of the 2010 league season he stopped playing Shen out of position but ignored him throughout most of the season and rarely played him at all.

After his contract expired at the end of the 2010 league season he would leave Shanghai Shenhua and subsequently join Hangzhou Greentown in January 2011 where he was reunited with one of his former Shenhua managers Wu Jingui. On March 1, 2011, in Hangzhou's first game of the season Shen would make his debut against Nagoya Grampus in a 2011 AFC Champions League group stage game, Which Hangzhou won 2–0.

Shen transferred to China League One newcomer Chongqing F.C. in February 2012. He became an unattached player at the end of 2013 season after Chongqing dissolved. He was linked with Super League club Tianjin TEDA. Shen moved to China League Two side Fujian Broncos in August 2014. However, he failed to register to play for Fujian Broncos. On 14 March 2016, Shen joined League Two club Shanghai JuJu Sports after settling his contract dispute with amateur club Shanghai Jiading Boo King.

== International career ==
He was a regular starter for the China Olympic (U-23) football team for several seasons. He subsequently was part of the Football at the 2008 Summer Olympics – Men's tournament squad where he played in the last group game coming on as a substitute for Hao Junmin.

Shen Longyuan made his international debut against Thailand national football team in a 3-3 friendly draw where he came on as a 46-minute substitute for Wang Dong.

== Career statistics ==
As of 31 December 2019

Appearances and goals by club, season and competition
Club	Season	League			National Cup		League Cup		Continental		Other		Total	
Club	Season	Division	Apps	Goals	Apps	Goals	Apps	Goals	Apps	Goals	Apps	Goals	Apps	Goals
Shanghai Shenhua	2004	Chinese Super League	2	0	0	0	1	1	0	0	0 (Note: Appearances in A3 Champions Cup)	0	2	0
Shanghai Shenhua	2005	Chinese Super League	1	0	0	0	0	0	-		-		1	0
Shanghai Shenhua	2006	Chinese Super League	10	1	1	0	-		3	0	-		14	1
Shanghai Shenhua	2007	Chinese Super League	11	0	-		-		0	0	0	0	11	0
Shanghai Shenhua	2008	Chinese Super League	19	1	-		-		-		-		19	1
Shanghai Shenhua	2009	Chinese Super League	19	1	-		-		5	0	-		24	1
Shanghai Shenhua	2010	Chinese Super League	7	0	-		-		-		-		7	0
Shanghai Shenhua	Total	Chinese Super League	69	3	1	0	1	1	8	0	0	0	79	4
Hangzhou Greentown	2011	Chinese Super League	21	1	1	0	-		4	0	-		25	1
Chongqing F.C.	2012	China League One	21	0	1	0	-		-		-		22	0
Chongqing F.C.	2013	China League One	19	0	2	0	-		-		-		21	0
Chongqing F.C.	Total		40	0	3	0	0	0	0	0	0	0	43	0
Shanghai JuJu Sports	2016	China League Two	18	6	5	4	-		-		-		23	10
Shanghai JuJu Sports	2017	China League Two	20	0	0	0	-		-		-		20	0
Shanghai JuJu Sports	Total		38	6	5	4	0	0	0	0	0	0	43	10
Taizhou Yuanda	2018	Chinese Champions League	-		-		-		-		-		-	-
Taizhou Yuanda	2019	China League Two	27	3	3	1	-		-		-		30	4
Taizhou Yuanda	Total		27	3	3	1	0	0	0	0	0	0	30	4
Career total			195	13	13	5	1	1	12	0	0	0	221	19
