= Cao Ziheng =

Chinese football player

Cao Ziheng 曹紫珩
Personal information
- Date of birth: 6 March 1995 (age 31)
- Place of birth: Dalian, Liaoning, China
- Height: 1.75 m (5 ft 9 in)
- Position: Midfielder

Team information
- Current team: Changchun Shenhua
- Number: 20

Youth career
- 2006–2013: Changchun Yatai

Senior career*
Years	Team	Apps	(Gls)
2014–2020	Changchun Yatai	10	(0)
2021–	Changchun Shenhua	0	(0)
- * Club domestic league appearances and goals as of 31 December 2022

Cao Ziheng (Chinese: 曹紫珩; born 6 March 1995 in Dalian) is a Chinese football player who currently plays for Changchun Shenhua.

== Club career ==
Cao Ziheng joined Chinese Super League side Changchun Yatai's youth academy in 2006. He was promoted to the first team squad in 2014. He made his league debut for Changchun on 24 August 2014 in a 3–1 away defeat against Guangzhou R&F, coming on as a substitute for Eninho in the 79th minute.

== Career statistics ==
Statistics accurate as of match played 31 December 2022.

Appearances and goals by club, season and competition
Club	Season	League			National Cup		Continental		Other		Total	
Club	Season	Division	Apps	Goals	Apps	Goals	Apps	Goals	Apps	Goals	Apps	Goals
Changchun Yatai	2014	Chinese Super League	2	0	0	0	-		-		2	0
Changchun Yatai	2015	Chinese Super League	4	0	0	0	-		-		4	0
Changchun Yatai	2016	Chinese Super League	1	0	1	0	-		-		2	0
Changchun Yatai	2017	Chinese Super League	0	0	0	0	-		-		0	0
Changchun Yatai	2018	Chinese Super League	3	0	1	0	-		-		4	0
Changchun Yatai	2019	China League One	2	0	0	0	-		-		2	0
Changchun Yatai	Total		10	0	4	0	0	0	0	0	14	0
Changchun Shenhua	2021	Chinese Champions League	-		-		-		-		0	0
Changchun Shenhua	2022	Chinese Champions League	-		-		-		-		0	0
Changchun Shenhua	Total		0	0	0	0	0	0	0	0	0	0
Career total			10	0	4	0	0	0	0	0	14	0
