= Sun Jiangshan =

Chinese footballer

Sun Jiangshan 孙江山
Personal information
- Full name: 孙江山
- Date of birth: October 24, 1985 (age 41)
- Place of birth: Qingdao, China
- Height: 1.82 m (5 ft 11 1/2 in)
- Position: Defender

Youth career
- 2000–2005: Qingdao Jonoon

Senior career*
Years	Team	Apps	(Gls)
2006–2016	Qingdao Jonoon	114	(0)
2017	Baoding Yingli ETS	12	(1)
2018	Qingdao Kangtine	–	(–)
2019	Qingdao Red Lions	13	(0)
2020–2022	Qingdao Youth Island	40	(1)

Managerial career
- 2023–2024: Qingdao West Coast (assistant)
- 2025: Guangxi Pingguo (assistant)
- * Club domestic league appearances and goals as of 31 December 2020

Sun Jiangshan (Simplified Chinese: 孙江山; born 24 October 1985, in Qingdao) is a Chinese football coach and former football player.

== Club career ==
Sun Jiangshan played for the Qingdao Jonoon youth before he was promoted to the senior team in the 2006 league season. With the season coming to an end and the club safely away from relegation the team's manager Yin Tiesheng would give Sun his chance to make his senior league debut for the club against Tianjin TEDA on October 15, 2006 where he came on as a late substitute in a 1-1 draw. The following season would see Sun make his first starting appearance for the club on May 5, 2007 in a league match against Beijing Guoan, which ended in a 3-1 defeat. By the end of the season Sun would make several further appearances for the club as he established himself as squad regular for the team, however it was the introduction of Guo Kanfeng as the team's new manager that saw Sun become the team's first choice right back when he played in twenty-three league games at the end of the 2009 league season. The following season saw Sun lose his place within the team as the club struggled to fight off relegation and it was only once the club brought in Chang Woe-Ryong did Sun see himself restored to the team's defence at the beginning of the 2011 league season.

In February 2017, Sun transferred to League One side Baoding Yingli ETS.

== Career statistics ==
Statistics accurate as of match played 31 December 2020.

Appearances and goals by club, season and competition
Club	Season	League			National Cup		Continental		Other		Total	
Club	Season	Division	Apps	Goals	Apps	Goals	Apps	Goals	Apps	Goals	Apps	Goals
Qingdao Jonoon	2006	Chinese Super League	1	0	0	0	-		-		1	0
Qingdao Jonoon	2007	Chinese Super League	12	0	-		-		-		12	0
Qingdao Jonoon	2008	Chinese Super League	14	0	-		-		-		14	0
Qingdao Jonoon	2009	Chinese Super League	23	0	-		-		-		23	0
Qingdao Jonoon	2010	Chinese Super League	6	0	-		-		-		5	0
Qingdao Jonoon	2011	Chinese Super League	10	0	1	0	-		-		11	0
Qingdao Jonoon	2012	Chinese Super League	5	0	1	0	-		-		6	0
Qingdao Jonoon	2013	Chinese Super League	0	0	1	0	-		-		1	0
Qingdao Jonoon	2014	China League One	6	0	2	0	-		-		8	0
Qingdao Jonoon	2015	China League One	11	0	1	0	-		-		12	0
Qingdao Jonoon	2016	China League One	26	0	1	1	-		-		27	1
Qingdao Jonoon	Total		114	0	7	1	0	0	0	0	121	1
Baoding Yingli ETS	2017	China League One	12	1	0	0	-		-		12	1
Qingdao Kangtine	2018	CMCL	-		-		-		-		-	
Qingdao Red Lions	2019	China League Two	13	0	0	0	-		-		13	0
Qingdao Zhongchuang Hengtai	2020	China League Two	6	0	-		-		-		6	0
Career total			145	1	7	1	0	0	0	0	152	2
