= Guangxi Pingguo F.C. =

Chinese association football club

Guangxi Pingguo 广西平果
- Full name: Guangxi Pingguo Football Club 广西平果足球俱乐部
- Founded: 27 February 2018; 7 years ago
- Ground: Pingguo Stadium, Pingguo
- Capacity: 30,000
- Chairman: Qin Zhihu
- Manager: Koji Maeda
- League: China League Two
- 2025: China League One, 15th of 16 (relegated)
Home colours	Away colours

Guangxi Pingguo Football Club (simplified Chinese: 广西平果足球俱乐部; traditional Chinese: 廣西平果足球俱樂部; pinyin: Guǎngxī Píngguǒ Zúqiú Jùlèbù; Zhuang: Gvangjsih Bingzgoj Cukgiuz Gilozbu) is a Chinese professional football club based in Pingguo, Guangxi, that competes in China League Two, the third tier of Chinese football. Guangxi Pingguo plays its home matches at the Pingguo Stadium, located within Pingguo. Founded in 2018 as Guangxi Baoyun Football Club, the club changed its name to Guangxi Pingguo Haliao Football Club in 2021, before changing to its current name in 2025.

== History ==
On February 27, 2018, the club was founded by Baoyun Real Estate Development Co. in Liuzhou as Guangxi Baoyun F.C. Participating in the provincial Guangxi Super League for its first time, the club managed to win the entire championship by beating Liuzhou Ranko in the finals, and secured a spot in the 2018 Chinese Champions League. In this new conquest, they finished 2nd in the group stage, and advanced to the final play-off stage, facing Chengdu Better City in the round of 16. After two hard-fought battles, although eventually losing 1–4 in Chengdu and facing elimination, the team managed to hold their ground at the home game and upset the guests with a 0–0 draw, which led to them achieving the rank of 13th out of 16 teams, just above Shenzhen Xinqiao and Qingdao Red Lions which lost their both two rounds of games—a rank eligible for admission to 2019 China League Two due to vacancies created by the withdrawal of several teams. They were eventually granted promotion on 1 February 2019.

Before the 2021 China League Two season, the club moved to Pingguo and changed its name to Guangxi Pingguo Haliao F.C. The club would come third within the division and qualified for the Promotion/Relegation play-offs against Xinjiang Tianshan Leopard where they won 1–0 on aggregate to gain promotion to the second tier for the first time in their history. In their debut season within the second tier they would avoid relegation and finish eleventh within the division, whilst also gaining the unique distinction of the most recorded draws in Chinese football history with seventeen draws throughout the league season.

On 15 January 2025, the club renamed themselves as Guangxi Pingguo Football Club.

== Players ==
=== Current squad ===
As of December 2025

Guangxi Pingguo Haliao logo used between 2018 and 2024

Note: Flags indicate national team as defined under FIFA eligibility rules; some limited exceptions apply. Players may hold more than one non-FIFA nationality.

No.	Pos.	Nation	Player
1	GK	CHN	Wang Yanhan
2	MF	CHN	Ning An
4	DF	CHN	Feng Yifan (on loan from Guangxi Hengchen)
5	DF	CHN	Yao Diran
7	DF	CHN	Zhang Ran
8	MF	CHN	Hu Jiajin
10	MF	TOG	Samuel Asamoah
11	DF	CHN	Liu Hao
13	GK	CHN	Wang Jinshuai (on loan from Henan FC)
15	MF	CHN	Wu Guichao
16	MF	CHN	Zhang Zili
17	MF	CHN	Yang Jingfan
19	DF	CHN	Chen Quanjiang
20	MF	CHN	Jiang Zhengjie
21	MF	CHN	Wang Jiancong
22	GK	CHN	He Lipan
25	DF	CHN	Chen Shihao

No.	Pos.	Nation	Player
27	MF	CHN	Wei Guoren
28	DF	CHN	Chen Shaohao
29	MF	CHN	Fu Shang
32	DF	CHN	You Wenjie (on loan from Wuhan Three Towns)
33	DF	CHN	Ding Quancheng
34	DF	CHN	Xiang Rongjun (on loan from Shanghai Port)
35	MF	CHN	Zhu Yue (on loan from Shanghai Shenhua)
36	DF	CHN	Yang Mingjie (on loan from Wuhan Three Towns B)
38	MF	CHN	Zhang Wei (on loan from Shanghai Shenhua)
39	MF	CHN	Lu Chenghe
43	FW	CMR	Michael Cheukoua
44	FW	CHN	Fan Chao (on loan from Changchun Yatai)
45	DF	CHN	Huang Wei

=== Reserve team ===
Note: Flags indicate national team as defined under FIFA eligibility rules; some limited exceptions apply. Players may hold more than one non-FIFA nationality.

No.	Pos.	Nation	Player

=== Out on loan ===
Note: Flags indicate national team as defined under FIFA eligibility rules; some limited exceptions apply. Players may hold more than one non-FIFA nationality.

No.	Pos.	Nation	Player
—	MF	CHN	Sun Weizhe (at Shijiazhuang Gongfu until 31 December 2025)
—	MF	CHN	Chen Yunhua (at Jiangxi Lushan until 31 December 2025)
—	MF	CHN	Lü Pin (at Dalian K'un City until 31 December 2025)

== Coaching staff ==
Position	Staff
Head coach	(Japan) Koji Maeda
Assistant coach	(China) Wang Haixin
Assistant coach	(China) Sun Jiangshan
Assistant coach	(China) Sun Weirong
Goalkeeper coach	(Japan) Kiyoto Furushima

Source: CFA

== Managerial history ==
- (China) Han Zhenyuan (2018)
- (South Korea) Wang Jung-hyun (2018–2019)
- (China) Pei Encai (2019)
- (China) Yang Lin (2019)
- (China) Zhao Changhong (August 2020 – November 2020)
- (China) Yang Lin (January 2021–July 2022)
- (Spain) Óscar Céspedes (July 2022–September 2022)
- (China) Zhao Changhong (September 2022–November 2022)
- (China) Jiang Chen (November 2022–October 2023)
- (Spain) Gabri (December 2023–April 2024)
- (China) Wang Xiao (April 2024–June 2024)
- (Brazil) André (June 2024–October 2024)
- (China) Zhou Lin (January 2025–May 2025)
- (Japan) Koji Maeda (May 2025–)

== Results ==
All-time league rankings

As of the end of 2025 season.

Year	Div	Pld	W	D	L	GF	GA	GD	Pts	Pos.	FA Cup	Super Cup	AFC	Att./G	Stadium
2018	4	7	3	3	1	18	7	11	N/A^{1}	13	DNQ	DNQ	DNQ		Rongshui Sports Park Stadium
2019	3	30	7	5	18	23	40	-17	26 ^{2}	27	R3	DNQ	DNQ		Liuzhou Sports Center
2020	3	10	2	2	6	8	13	-5	8 ^{2}	17	R3	DNQ	DNQ		
2021	3	30	15	9	4	58	25	13	54	3	R2	DNQ	DNQ		
2022	2	34	6	17	11	32	36	-4	35	11	R2	DNQ	DNQ		
2023	2	30	14	12	4	38	20	18	54	4	R2	DNQ	DNQ	15,135	Pingguo Stadium
2024	2	30	11	14	5	42	37	5	47	8	R16	DNQ	DNQ	17,125	Pingguo Stadium
2025	2	30	6	7	17	24	47	-23	25	15	R3	DNQ	DNQ	6,937	Pingguo Stadium

- ^{1} Only include Regional Finals and National Finals.
- ^{2} In group stage.

Key

	China top division
	China second division
	China third division
	China fourth division
W	Winners
RU	Runners-up
3	Third place
	Relegated

- Pld = Played
- W = Games won
- D = Games drawn
- L = Games lost
- F = Goals for
- A = Goals against
- Pts = Points
- Pos = Final position
- DNQ = Did not qualify
- DNE = Did not enter
- NH = Not held
- WD = Withdrawal
- – = Does not exist
- R1 = Round 1
- R2 = Round 2
- R3 = Round 3
- R4 = Round 4
- F = Final
- SF = Semi-finals
- QF = Quarter-finals
- R16 = Round of 16
- Group = Group stage
- GS2 = Second Group stage
- QR1 = First Qualifying Round
- QR2 = Second Qualifying Round
- QR3 = Third Qualifying Round
