= Pingguo Stadium =

Sports venue in Pingguo, China

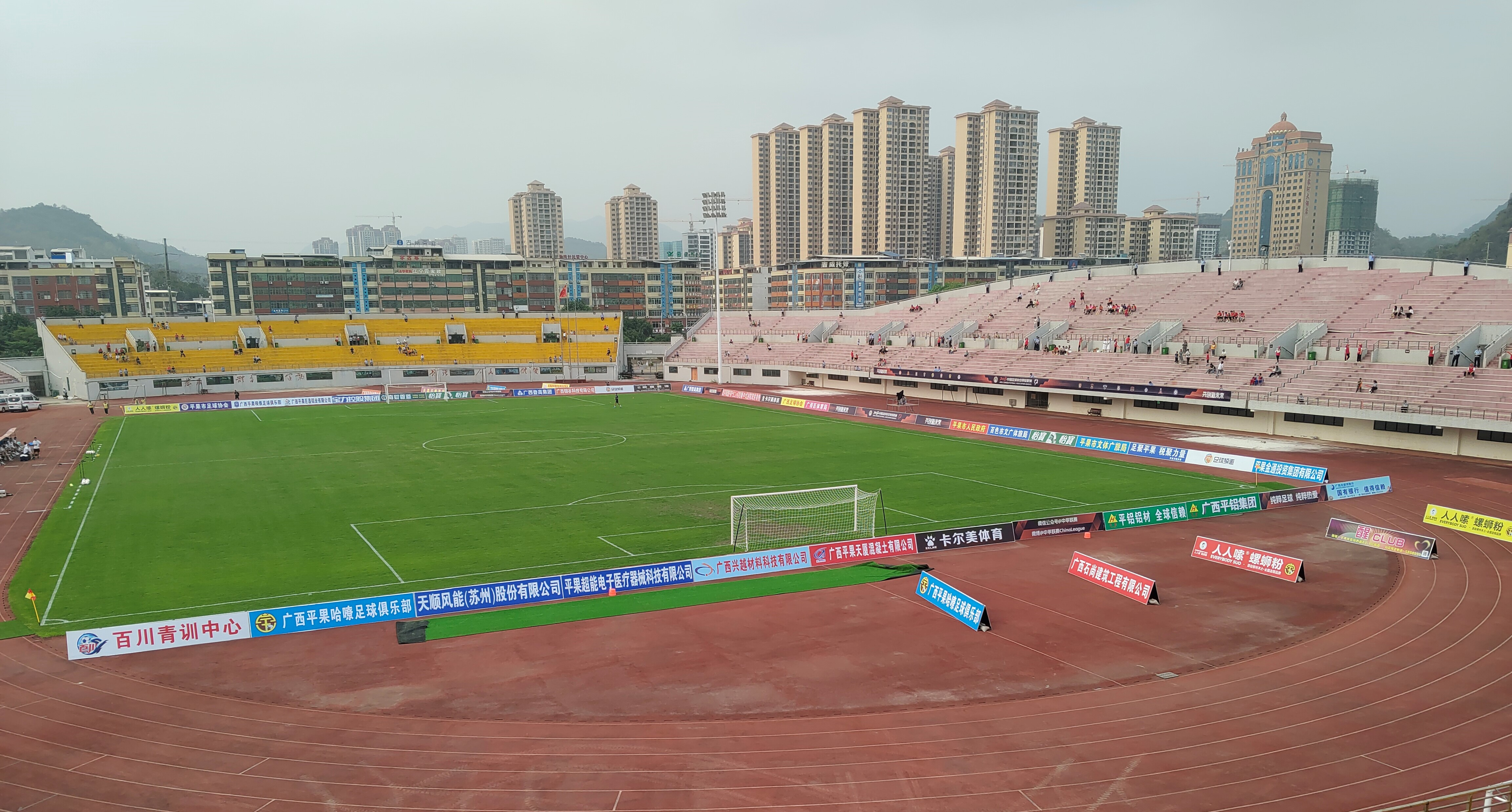
- Pingguo Stadium in 2023
- Interactive map of Pingguo Stadium
- Location: Pingguo, Guangxi, China
- Coordinates: 23°20′08″N 107°34′59″E
- Capacity: 30,000

Construction
- Groundbreaking: 2004
- Opened: 2006
- Renovated: 2023–2024

Tenant
- Guangxi Pingguo F.C. (2023–present)

The Pingguo Stadium, known as the Pingguo Guojing Stadium (Chinese: 平果国晶体育场) for sponsorship reasons, is a multi-purpose stadium located in Pingguo, Guangxi, China. It is the home of China League One club Guangxi Pingguo Haliao. Construction of the stadium began on November 11, 2004, and was completed on August 31, 2006.
