= 2024 China League One =

China League One
- Season: 2024
- Dates: 9 March – 3 November
- Champions: Yunnan Yukun
- Promoted: Yunnan Yukun; Dalian Yingbo
- Relegated: Wuxi Wugo; Jiangxi Lushan
- Matches: 240
- Goals: 596 (2.48 per match)
- Top goalscorer: Nyasha Mushekwi (25 goals)
- Biggest home win: Yunnan Yukun 5–0 Liaoning Tieren (30 June 2024)
- Biggest away win: Guangzhou 0–5 Yunnan Yukun (30 March 2024); Wuxi Wugo 1–6 Qingdao Red Lions (6 April 2024); Yanbian Longding 0–5 Suzhou Dongwu (7 July 2024)
- Highest scoring: Heilongjiang Ice City 4–4 Foshan Nanshi (26 May 2024)
- Longest winning run: Dalian Yingbo; Yunnan Yukun (5 matches, twice)
- Longest unbeaten run: Chongqing Tonglianglong; Yunnan Yukun (12 matches)
- Longest winless run: Jiangxi Lushan (18 matches)
- Longest losing run: Jiangxi Lushan (6 matches)
- Highest attendance: 60,951; Dalian Yingbo 2–1 Shanghai Jiading Huilong (3 November 2024)
- Lowest attendance: 528; Wuxi Wugo 1–4 Guangzhou (8 September 2024)
- Total attendance: 2,284,702
- Average attendance: 9,520

The 2024 Chinese Football Association League 1 (Chinese: 2024中国足球协会甲级联赛) was the 21st season of China League One, the second tier of the Chinese football league pyramid, since its establishment in 2004.

== Clubs ==
=== Club changes ===
==== To League One ====
Teams promoted from 2023 China League Two

- Chongqing Tonglianglong
- Dalian Zhixing
- Yunnan Yukun
- Qingdao Red Lions

==== From League One ====
Teams promoted to 2024 Chinese Super League

- Sichuan Jiuniu
- Qingdao West Coast

Dissolved entries

- ~~Dalian Pro~~
- ~~Shenzhen~~
- ~~Jinan Xingzhou~~

Expelled entries

- ~~Dandong Tengyue~~

Wuxi Wugo and Jiangxi Lushan were reprieved from relegation to the 2024 China League Two after finishing in the bottom two places due to the dissolutions of Dalian Pro and Shenzhen.

==== Name changes ====
- Dongguan United F.C. changed their name to Foshan Nanshi in December 2023.
- Dalian Zhixing F.C. changed their name to Dalian Yingbo in January 2024.
- Liaoning Shenyang Urban F.C. changed their name to Liaoning Tieren in February 2024.

=== Stadiums and locations ===
Locations of the 2024 China League One teams
2024 China League One teams in Jiangsu and Shanghai

Team	Head coach	City	Stadium	Capacity	2023 season
Shijiazhuang Gongfu	(China) Liu Cheng (caretaker)	Shijiazhuang	Yutong International Sports Center	38,000	3rd
Guangxi Pingguo Haliao	(Brazil) André Gaspar	Pingguo	Pingguo Stadium	30,000	4th
Nanjing City	(China) Zhang Xiaofeng	Nanjing	Wutaishan Stadium	22,000	5th
Foshan Nanshi	(China) Zhou Chenhan	Foshan	Nanhai Sports Center	20,000	7th
Yanbian Longding	(South Korea) Lee Ki-hyung	Yanji	Yanji Stadium	30,000	8th
Heilongjiang Ice City	(China) Duan Xin	Harbin	Harbin ICE Sports Center	48,000	9th
Heilongjiang Ice City	(China) Duan Xin	Harbin	Acheng Cultural and Sports Center	5,000	9th
Liaoning Tieren	(China) Li Jinyu	Shenyang	Shenyang Olympic Sports Center Stadium	60,000	10th
Liaoning Tieren	(China) Li Jinyu	Shenyang	Shenyang Urban Stadium	20,000	10th
Shanghai Jiading Huilong	(China) Yang Lin	Shanghai	Jiading Stadium	9,704	11th
Guangzhou	(Spain) Salva Suay	Guangzhou	Huadu Stadium	13,394	12th
Suzhou Dongwu	(South Korea) Kim Dae-eui	Suzhou	Kunshan Sports Centre Stadium (Kunshan)	30,000	14th
Suzhou Dongwu	(South Korea) Kim Dae-eui	Suzhou	Suzhou Olympic Sports Centre	40,933	14th
Suzhou Dongwu	(South Korea) Kim Dae-eui	Suzhou	Suzhou Sports Center	35,000	14th
Chongqing Tonglianglong ^{P}	(China) Yu Yuanwei	Chongqing	Tongliang Long Stadium	15,000	CL2, 1st
Dalian Yingbo ^{P}	(China) Li Guoxu	Dalian	Dalian Suoyuwan Football Stadium	63,671	CL2, 2nd
Dalian Yingbo ^{P}	(China) Li Guoxu	Dalian	Puwan Stadium	30,000	CL2, 2nd
Wuxi Wugo	(China) Wang Dan (caretaker)	Wuxi	Wuxi Sports Center	28,000	15th
Wuxi Wugo	(China) Wang Dan (caretaker)	Wuxi	Jiangyin Sports Centre (Jiangyin)	30,161	15th
Jiangxi Lushan	(China) Wang Bo	Ruichang	Ruichang Sports Park Stadium	13,188	16th
Jiangxi Lushan	(China) Wang Bo	Ruichang	Jiujiang Stadium (Jiujiang)	31,000	16th
Yunnan Yukun ^{P}	(Norway) Jørn Andersen	Yuxi	Yuxi Plateau Sports Center Stadium	25,000	CL2, 3rd
Qingdao Red Lions ^{P}	(China) Ma Yongkang	Qingdao	Tiantai Stadium	20,525	CL2, 4th
Qingdao Red Lions ^{P}	(China) Ma Yongkang	Qingdao	Qingdao West Coast University City Sports Center	27,000	CL2, 4th

=== Managerial changes ===
Team	Outgoing manager	Manner of departure	Date of vacancy	Position in table	Incoming manager	Date of appointment
Foshan Nanshi	(China) Wang Hongwei	Sacked	3 December 2023	Pre-season	(Serbia) Dejan Antonić	
Guangxi Pingguo Haliao	(China) Zhao Tuqiang (interim)	End of interim spell	5 December 2023	Pre-season	(Spain) Gabri	5 December 2023
Jiangxi Lushan	(China) Yu Ming	Mutual consent	29 December 2023	Pre-season	(China) Li Zheng	29 December 2023
Chongqing Tonglianglong	(China) Lin Lin	Mutual consent	23 January 2024	Pre-season	(China) Yu Yuanwei	23 January 2024
Nanjing City	(China) Cao Rui	Mutual consent	3 February 2024	Pre-season	(South Korea) Kim Jong-boo	3 February 2024
Suzhou Dongwu	(China) Niu Hongli	Mutual consent	14 February 2024	Pre-season	(South Korea) Kim Dae-eui	14 February 2024
Shijiazhuang Gongfu	(China) Zhou Lin	Mutual consent	20 February 2024	Pre-season	(Spain) Juan Carlos Añón	20 February 2024
Wuxi Wugo	(China) Li Yinan	Sacked	27 February 2024	Pre-season	(Spain) Ibán Cuadrado	1 March 2024
Shijiazhuang Gongfu	(Spain) Juan Carlos Añón	Sacked	23 March 2024	14th	(China) Liu Cheng (interim)	23 March 2024
Guangxi Pingguo Haliao	(Spain) Gabri	Resigned	2 April 2024	5th	(China) Wang Xiao (interim)	2 April 2024
Shijiazhuang Gongfu	(China) Liu Cheng (interim)	End of interim spell	6 April 2024	6th	(Bulgaria) Zoran Janković	6 April 2024
Liaoning Tieren	(China) Gao Mingqi	Sacked	8 April 2024	10th	(China) Sun Wei	8 April 2024
Jiangxi Lushan	(China) Li Zheng	Resigned	22 April 2024	16th	(China) Wang Bo	22 April 2024
Foshan Nanshi	(Serbia) Dejan Antonić	Resigned	24 April 2024	14th	(China) Jiang Hai (interim)	24 April 2024
Heilongjiang Ice City	(China) Jia Shunhao	Resigned	30 April 2024	13th	(China) Wang Helong	1 May 2024
Foshan Nanshi	(China) Jiang Hai (interim)	End of interim spell	3 May 2024	15th	(Spain) Víctor Torres Mestre	3 May 2024
Wuxi Wugo	(Spain) Ibán Cuadrado	Sacked	20 May 2024	15th	(China) Zhang Hui	23 May 2024
Yunnan Yukun	(China) Li Jinyu	Resigned	22 May 2024	1st	(China) Guo Guangqi (interim)	22 May 2024
Nanjing City	(South Korea) Kim Jong-boo	Sacked	24 May 2024	7th	(Brazil) Fábio Cortez	24 May 2024
Yanbian Longding	(South Korea) Kim Bong-gil	Sacked	4 June 2024	8th	(Spain) Ibán Cuadrado	5 June 2024
Yunnan Yukun	(China) Guo Guangqi (interim)	End of interim spell	12 June 2024	1st	(Norway) Jørn Andersen	12 June 2024
Guangxi Pingguo Haliao	(China) Wang Xiao (interim)	End of interim spell	22 June 2024	4th	(Brazil) André Gaspar	22 June 2024
Liaoning Tieren	(China) Sun Wei	Sacked	2 July 2024	14th	(China) Li Jinyu	2 July 2024

== Foreign players ==
- Players name in **bold** indicates the player is registered during the mid-season transfer window.
- Players name in italics indicates the player is out of squad or left their respective clubs during the mid-season transfer window.

Team	Player 1	Player 2	Player 3	Hong Kong/Macau/ Taiwan players^{1}	Naturalised players	Former players
Chongqing Tonglianglong	(Cameroon) Serge Tabekou	(Serbia) Aleksandar Andrejević	(Serbia) **Stefan Vukić**	(Chinese Taipei) Yaki Yen		(Argentina) Juan Lescano
Dalian Yingbo	(Brazil) **Fernando Karanga**	(Brazil) Róbson	(Slovenia) Andrej Kotnik	(Hong Kong) **Oliver Gerbig**		(Guinea-Bissau) José Embaló
Foshan Nanshi	(Cape Verde) **Carlos Fortes**	(Panama) Rafael Águila	(Serbia) Mario Maslać	(Chinese Taipei) **Yu Yao-hsing**	(United States) → (China) Sun Delin^{2}	(Central African Republic) Alfred Gombe-Fei
Guangxi Pingguo Haliao	(Brazil) Giovanny	(Luxembourg) **Gerson Rodrigues**	(Malaysia) Hector Hevel	(Hong Kong) Vas Nuñez		(Morocco) Yacine Bammou
Guangzhou	(Colombia) Juan Alegría	(Colombia) Juan Peñaloza	(Lithuania) Rimvydas Sadauskas			
Heilongjiang Ice City	(Brazil) Daciel	(Colombia) Ítalo Montaño	(Colombia) **Boris Palacios**	(Chinese Taipei) **Wu Yen-shu**	(South Korea) → (China) Xu Hui^{2}	(Brazil) Allan Paulista
Jiangxi Lushan	(Brazil) Willie	(Lesotho) Thabiso Brown	(Portugal) **Fábio Fortes**			(The Gambia) Malang Faye
Liaoning Tieren	(Brazil) **João Carlos**	(Japan) Takahiro Kunimoto	(Nigeria) Sabir Musa	(Chinese Taipei) **Ange Kouamé**		(Nigeria) Geoffrey Chinedu
Nanjing City	(Brazil) Moresche	(Brazil) **Jefferson Nem**	(Nigeria) Moses Ogbu	(Hong Kong) Alexandre Dujardin		(Nigeria) Kingsley Onuegbu
Qingdao Red Lions	(France) Yaya Sanogo	(Republic of Ireland) **Jimmy Mwanga**	(Togo) Samuel Asamoah	(Chinese Taipei) Chen Hao-wei		(Brazil) João Pedro
Shanghai Jiading Huilong	(Brazil) Magno Cruz	(Brazil) Dominic Vinicius	(Ghana) Evans Etti			
Shijiazhuang Gongfu	(Brazil) **Erikys**	(Cameroon) Messi Bouli	(Ecuador) José Ayoví			(Serbia) Mladen Kovačević
Suzhou Dongwu	(Brazil) Leonardo	(Ghana) **Nassam Ibrahim**	(South Korea) Yeon Jei-min	(Hong Kong) Clement Benhaddouche		(Brazil) João Leonardo
Wuxi Wugo	(England) **Joel Nouble**	(Montenegro) Staniša Mandić		(Hong Kong) **Yu Wai Lim**		(Serbia) Nikola Dišić (Serbia) Dimitrije Pobulić
Yanbian Longding	(Brazil) Ivo	(Brazil) Ronan	(Colombia) Victor Arboleda			
Yunnan Yukun	(Morocco) Zakaria Labyad	(Romania) Alexandru Ioniță	(Zimbabwe) Nyasha Mushekwi	(Hong Kong) **Tsui Wang Kit**		

- **^1** For Hong Kong, Macau, or Taiwanese players, if they are non-naturalised and were registered as professional footballers in Hong Kong's, Macau's, or Chinese Taipei's football association for the first time, they are recognised as native players. Otherwise they are recognised as foreign players.
- **^2** Naturalised players whose parents or grandparents were born in mainland China, thus are regarded as local players.

== League table ==
Pos	Team	Pld	W	D	L	GF	GA	GD	Pts	Promotion, qualification or relegation
1	Yunnan Yukun (C, P)	30	20	6	4	70	20	+50	66	Promotion to Super League
2	Dalian Yingbo (P)	30	17	6	7	44	29	+15	57	Promotion to Super League
3	Guangzhou	30	14	10	6	51	35	+16	52	Dissolved
4	Liaoning Tieren	30	14	8	8	41	33	+8	50 (Note: Liaoning Tieren are ahead of Chongqing Tonglianglong on head-to-head goal difference: Liaoning Tieren +1, Chongqing Tonglianglong -1)	
5	Chongqing Tonglianglong	30	13	11	6	42	25	+17	50	
6	Shijiazhuang Gongfu	30	13	9	8	33	28	+5	48 (Note: Shijiazhuang Gongfu are ahead of Suzhou Dongwu on head-to-head goal difference: Shijiazhuang Gongfu +1, Suzhou Dongwu -1)	
7	Suzhou Dongwu	30	12	12	6	46	34	+12	48	
8	Guangxi Pingguo Haliao	30	11	14	5	42	37	+5	47	
9	Nanjing City	30	8	10	12	34	41	−7	34	
10	Foshan Nanshi	30	6	14	10	30	41	−11	32	
11	Shanghai Jiading Huilong	30	5	16	9	21	27	−6	31 (Note: Shanghai Jiading Huilong are ahead of Yanbian Longding on goal difference)	
12	Yanbian Longding	30	7	10	13	31	50	−19	31	
13	Heilongjiang Ice City	30	6	9	15	25	42	−17	27	
14	Qingdao Red Lions	30	5	11	14	36	49	−13	26	
15	Wuxi Wugo (R)	30	5	7	18	25	49	−24	22	Relegation to League Two
16	Jiangxi Lushan (R)	30	4	7	19	25	56	−31	19	Relegation to League Two

Source: Soccerway
Rules for classification:
- During season: 1) Points; 2) Head-to-head points; 3) Head-to-head goal difference; 4) Head-to-head goals scored; 5) Goal difference; 6) Goals scored; 7) Rankings in the previous season. (Rules 2 to 4 are only applied when teams concerned have finished both/all the matches against others.)
- After season: 1) Points; 2) Head-to-head points; 3) Head-to-head goal difference; 4) Head-to-head goals scored; 5) Goal difference; 6) Goals scored; 7) Disciplinary points (yellow card = 1 point, red card = 3 points); 8) Drawing of lots.
  (C) Champions; (P) Promoted; (R) Relegated
  Notes:

== Results ==
Home \ Away	CQT	DLY	FSN	GPH	GZH	HLJ	JXL	LNT	NJC	QRL	SJH	SJZ	SZD	WXW	YBL	YNY
Chongqing Tonglianglong	—	3–0	1–1	1–1	2–1	1–1	4–0	1–0	1–0	1–1	1–1	2–1	2–0	3–1	1–1	3–2
Dalian Yingbo	2–2	—	3–1	1–0	0–1	1–0	3–0	3–2	2–0	4–0	2–1	1–1	2–0	2–1	2–0	0–3
Foshan Nanshi	0–4	2–2	—	1–1	1–1	5–1	1–1	0–2	0–0	1–1	1–2	1–1	1–1	2–0	2–0	0–0
Guangxi Pingguo Haliao	1–1	0–2	2–1	—	3–4	1–0	2–0	1–1	2–2	3–2	2–2	0–0	1–1	1–0	3–2	1–0
Guangzhou	2–0	2–0	3–0	1–1	—	0–1	0–0	1–3	1–1	1–1	2–1	3–1	1–1	2–1	3–1	0–5
Heilongjiang Ice City	0–0	1–2	4–4	1–2	1–3	—	0–0	2–0	2–1	2–1	1–1	0–1	2–4	0–1	0–1	0–0
Jiangxi Lushan	1–0	0–3	0–1	0–1	2–5	0–0	—	1–1	2–1	1–2	0–0	1–2	2–5	2–0	0–1	2–3
Liaoning Tieren	2–0	2–1	0–1	2–1	0–2	3–0	2–1	—	5–1	2–2	1–1	0–2	2–0	0–0	2–1	2–1
Nanjing City	1–2	2–0	0–0	4–1	2–1	3–2	2–1	0–0	—	2–1	0–0	1–1	2–2	1–1	0–1	0–2
Qingdao Red Lions	1–0	0–1	0–0	2–3	1–1	0–1	1–2	0–1	2–1	—	0–0	1–1	3–3	1–2	3–2	2–3
Shanghai Jiading Huilong	0–3	0–0	0–0	1–1	0–2	0–0	3–1	1–0	0–1	1–1	—	0–1	1–1	2–0	0–0	1–2
Shijiazhuang Gongfu	1–0	0–0	2–1	1–1	1–0	1–0	2–1	0–1	3–1	2–0	0–0	—	2–0	2–4	0–1	3–2
Suzhou Dongwu	1–0	0–1	3–0	2–2	1–1	0–0	4–1	2–2	2–1	2–1	1–0	1–0	—	2–0	1–1	0–0
Wuxi Wugo	0–1	1–2	4–1	0–0	1–4	0–1	2–2	1–2	1–1	1–6	0–1	0–0	0–1	—	2–0	0–4
Yanbian Longding	1–1	2–2	0–1	2–4	2–2	3–2	2–1	1–1	1–2	0–0	1–1	1–0	0–5	1–1	—	1–3
Yunnan Yukun	1–1	2–0	2–0	0–0	1–1	3–0	3–0	5–0	2–1	5–0	2–0	4–1	3–0	2–0	5–1	—

Source: Soccerway
Legend: Blue = home team win; Yellow = draw; Red = away team win.
For upcoming matches, an "a" indicates there is an article about the rivalry between the two participants.

== Positions by round ==
To preserve chronological evolvements, any postponed matches are not included to the round at which they were originally scheduled, but added to the full round they were played immediately afterwards. For example, if a match is scheduled for round 7, but then played between rounds 8 and 9, it will be added to the standings for round 8.

Team ╲ Round	1	2	3	4	5	6	7	8	9	10	11	12	13	14	15	16	17	18	19	20	21	22	23	24	25	26	27	28	29	30
Yunnan Yukun	11	6	2	2	1	1	2	2	1	1	1	1	1	1	1	1	1	1	1	1	1	1	1	1	1	1	1	1	1	1
Dalian Yingbo	5	1	1	1	2	2	1	1	2	2	2	3	3	3	3	3	2	2	2	2	2	2	2	2	2	2	2	2	2	2
Guangzhou	14	7	3	13	9	10	7	8	6	6	6	6	6	6	6	6	6	6	6	4	3	3	3	3	3	3	3	3	3	3
Liaoning Tieren	12	10	15	15	11	11	11	11	11	13	13	13	11	12	14	11	10	10	9	8	8	8	8	7	7	6	5	6	6	4
Chongqing Tonglianglong	4	5	7	3	3	3	3	4	3	3	3	2	2	2	2	2	3	3	3	3	4	4	4	5	4	4	4	4	4	5
Shijiazhuang Gongfu	8	14	10	6	5	7	6	6	5	5	4	5	5	5	7	8	7	7	7	7	7	7	7	8	8	8	8	8	8	6
Suzhou Dongwu	7	11	6	4	7	5	5	5	9	8	8	9	7	7	5	5	5	4	4	5	6	5	5	4	5	5	6	5	5	7
Guangxi Pingguo Haliao	1	2	4	5	4	4	4	3	4	4	5	4	4	4	4	4	4	5	5	6	5	6	6	6	6	7	7	7	7	8
Nanjing City	2	8	14	10	8	8	8	9	7	7	10	7	9	8	8	7	8	8	8	9	9	9	9	9	10	11	11	9	9	9
Foshan Nanshi	9	9	13	14	13	13	14	15	13	14	14	14	14	14	13	14	14	14	14	14	14	14	14	14	14	12	12	12	12	10
Shanghai Jiading Huilong	13	12	8	7	12	12	12	12	12	11	11	11	12	11	11	10	9	9	10	10	10	10	10	11	9	10	9	11	11	11
Yanbian Longding	6	15	11	8	10	6	9	10	8	9	7	8	10	10	10	12	12	13	12	13	11	11	11	10	11	9	10	10	10	12
Heilongjiang Ice City	3	4	12	12	14	14	13	13	14	12	12	12	13	13	12	13	13	12	13	11	12	12	12	12	12	13	13	13	14	13
Qingdao Red Lions	15	13	9	11	6	9	10	7	10	10	9	10	8	9	9	9	11	11	11	12	13	13	13	13	13	14	14	14	13	14
Wuxi Wugo	10	3	5	9	15	15	15	14	15	15	15	15	15	15	15	15	15	15	15	15	15	15	15	15	15	15	15	15	15	15
Jiangxi Lushan	16	16	16	16	16	16	16	16	16	16	16	16	16	16	16	16	16	16	16	16	16	16	16	16	16	16	16	16	16	16

Leader and promotion to Super League
Promotion to Super League
Relegation to League Two

Source: Soccerway

== Results by match played ==
Team ╲ Round	1	2	3	4	5	6	7	8	9	10	11	12	13	14	15	16	17	18	19	20	21	22	23	24	25	26	27	28	29	30
Chongqing Tonglianglong	W	D	L	W	D	W	W	D	W	W	D	W	W	W	D	L	D	D	L	D	L	D	W	L	W	W	L	D	W	D
Dalian Yingbo	W	W	W	W	D	W	W	D	L	W	D	L	W	L	D	W	W	W	W	W	L	D	D	L	W	L	W	W	L	W
Foshan Nanshi	D	D	D	L	D	D	L	L	W	L	D	L	D	W	W	L	D	L	D	L	D	D	D	L	D	W	D	W	L	W
Guangxi Pingguo Haliao	W	D	L	W	D	W	W	W	D	D	L	W	D	W	D	W	L	L	D	D	W	D	D	D	D	D	W	L	W	D
Guangzhou	L	W	D	L	W	L	W	D	W	D	W	W	L	D	D	W	L	W	D	W	W	W	D	W	D	D	D	W	W	L
Heilongjiang Ice City	W	D	L	L	L	D	L	D	L	W	D	W	L	L	W	L	D	D	L	W	D	L	D	L	L	L	L	D	L	W
Jiangxi Lushan	L	D	L	L	L	D	L	L	L	L	L	L	D	L	D	L	L	L	W	L	D	D	W	W	L	L	D	L	L	W
Liaoning Tieren	L	D	L	D	W	L	W	D	L	L	D	D	W	L	L	W	W	D	W	D	W	D	W	W	W	W	W	L	W	W
Nanjing City	W	L	L	D	W	D	D	D	W	L	L	W	D	W	D	D	L	W	L	L	D	L	D	L	L	D	L	W	L	W
Qingdao Red Lions	L	D	W	L	W	L	D	W	L	D	D	D	W	L	L	L	D	D	D	L	L	D	L	L	D	L	L	D	W	L
Shanghai Jiading Huilong	L	D	W	D	L	L	D	D	D	W	L	W	L	D	D	D	W	D	D	L	D	D	D	D	W	L	D	D	L	L
Shijiazhuang Gongfu	D	L	W	W	D	L	W	D	W	W	W	L	L	D	L	L	W	W	D	D	L	W	D	L	D	D	W	W	W	W
Suzhou Dongwu	D	L	W	W	L	W	D	D	L	D	D	D	W	W	W	W	L	W	D	D	D	W	D	W	D	W	L	D	W	L
Wuxi Wugo	D	W	L	L	L	L	L	D	L	L	D	L	L	L	D	W	D	L	D	W	L	L	D	W	L	L	W	L	L	L
Yanbian Longding	D	L	W	D	D	W	L	D	W	L	W	L	L	D	L	L	D	L	D	D	W	D	L	W	L	W	L	D	L	L
Yunnan Yukun	D	W	W	W	W	W	L	D	W	W	W	D	W	W	W	W	W	D	D	W	W	D	L	W	W	W	W	L	W	L

Source: Soccerway
W = Win; D = Draw; L = Loss

== Statistics ==
=== Top scorers ===
As of 3 November 2024

Rank	Player	Club	Goals
1	(Zimbabwe) Nyasha Mushekwi	Yunnan Yukun	25
2	(Colombia) Juan Alegría	Guangzhou	18
3	(Brazil) Leonardo	Suzhou Dongwu	17
4	(China) Xiang Yuwang	Chongqing Tonglianglong	15
5	(Cameroon) Messi Bouli	Shijiazhuang Gongfu	14
6	(Brazil) Ronan	Yanbian Longding	12
7	(Brazil) Giovanny	Guangxi Pingguo Haliao	11
8	(China) Han Zilong	Yunnan Yukun	10
8	(Brazil) Dominic Vinicius	Shanghai Jiading Huilong	10
8	(Chinese Taipei) Ange Kouamé	Liaoning Tieren	10
11	(Nigeria) Moses Ogbu	Nanjing City	9
12	(Slovenia) Andrej Kotnik	Dalian Yingbo	8
12	(Romania) Alexandru Ioniță	Yunnan Yukun	8
12	(Brazil) João Carlos	Liaoning Tieren	8
12	(Cape Verde) Carlos Fortes	Foshan Nanshi	8
12	(China) Liang Weipang	Suzhou Dongwu	8
12	(Lesotho) Thabiso Brown	Jiangxi Lushan	8

=== Hat-tricks ===
Player	For	Against	Result	Date
(Brazil) Leonardo	Suzhou Dongwu	Heilongjiang Ice City	4-2 (A)	8 June 2024
(Slovenia) Andrej Kotnik	Dalian Yingbo	Qingdao Red Lions	4-0 (H)	7 July 2024
(China) Xiang Yuwang	Chongqing Tonglianglong	Yunnan Yukun	3-2 (H)	15 September 2024
(Zimbabwe) Nyasha Mushekwi	Yunnan Yukun	Qingdao Red Lions	5-0 (H)	21 September 2024
(Cape Verde) Carlos Fortes	Foshan Nanshi	Heilongjiang Ice City	5-1 (H)	5 October 2024

== Awards ==
=== Player of the Round ===
Player of the Round
Round	Player	Club	Ref.
1	(China) Hu Rentian	Guangxi Pingguo Haliao	
2	(Colombia) Juan Alegría	Guangzhou	
3	(China) Wang Song	Shijiazhuang Gongfu	
4	(Morocco) Zakaria Labyad	Yunnan Yukun	
5	(Chinese Taipei) Chen Hao-wei	Qingdao Red Lions	
6	(China) Mao Weijie	Dalian Yingbo	
7	(Cameroon) Messi Bouli	Shijiazhuang Gongfu	
8	(Brazil) Giovanny	Guangxi Pingguo Haliao	
9	(Brazil) Ronan	Yanbian Longding	
10	(China) Han Zilong	Yunnan Yukun	
11	(Colombia) Juan Alegría (2)	Guangzhou	
12	(Brazil) Giovanny (2)	Guangxi Pingguo Haliao	
13	(Brazil) Leonardo	Suzhou Dongwu	
14	(Zimbabwe) Nyasha Mushekwi	Yunnan Yukun	
15	(China) Han Zilong (2)	Yunnan Yukun	
16	(Brazil) Leonardo (2)	Suzhou Dongwu	
17	(Brazil) João Carlos	Liaoning Tieren	
18	(China) Fei Yu	Dalian Yingbo	
19	(Chinese Taipei) Ange Kouamé	Liaoning Tieren	
20	(China) Mao Weijie (2)	Dalian Yingbo	
21	(China) Yi Xianlong	Guangxi Pingguo Haliao	
22	(Colombia) Juan Peñaloza	Guangzhou	
23	(China) Xiang Yuwang	Chongqing Tonglianglong	
24	(Zimbabwe) Nyasha Mushekwi (2)	Yunnan Yukun	
25	(Slovenia) Andrej Kotnik	Dalian Yingbo	
26	(Cape Verde) Carlos Fortes	Foshan Nanshi	
27	(Morocco) Zakaria Labyad (2)	Yunnan Yukun	
28	(Brazil) Moresche	Nanjing City	
29	(Brazil) Leonardo (3)	Suzhou Dongwu	

=== Monthly awards ===
Month	Player of the Month		Manager of the Month		Young Player of the Month	
Month	Player	Club	Manager	Club	Player	Club
March	(Zimbabwe) Nyasha Mushekwi	Yunnan Yukun	(China) Li Guoxu	Dalian Yingbo	(China) Song Pan	Chongqing Tonglianglong
April	(Brazil) Giovanny	Guangxi Pingguo Haliao	(China) Wang Xiao	Guangxi Pingguo Haliao	(China) Bao Shengxin	Shanghai Jiading Huilong
May	(Colombia) Juan Alegría	Guangzhou	(Bulgaria) Zoran Janković	Shijiazhuang Gongfu	(China) Xiang Yuwang	Chongqing Tonglianglong
June	(Brazil) Leonardo (Zimbabwe) Nyasha Mushekwi	Suzhou Dongwu; Yunnan Yukun	(South Korea) Kim Dae-eui	Suzhou Dongwu	(China) Xiang Yuwang	Chongqing Tonglianglong
July	(Brazil) João Carlos	Liaoning Tieren	(China) Li Guoxu	Dalian Yingbo	(China) He Mingli	Wuxi Wugo
August	(Chinese Taipei) Ange Kouamé	Liaoning Tieren	(China) Li Jinyu	Liaoning Tieren	(China) Mao Weijie	Dalian Yingbo
September	(Zimbabwe) Nyasha Mushekwi	Yunnan Yukun	(China) Li Jinyu	Liaoning Tieren	(China) Xiang Yuwang	Chongqing Tonglianglong

== League attendances ==
Pos	Team	Total	High	Low	Average	Change
1	Dalian Yingbo	632,805	60,951	15,828	42,187	+2,473.9%^{†}
2	Yunnan Yukun	282,978	19,986	16,128	18,865	+103.6%^{†}
3	Guangxi Pingguo Haliao	256,871	23,866	10,129	17,125	+13.1%
4	Liaoning Tieren	221,286	23,880	7,756	14,752	+461.8%
5	Yanbian Longding	158,614	19,450	6,416	10,574	−29.1%
6	Chongqing Tonglianglong	139,854	11,833	4,033	9,324	+8.5%^{†}
7	Heilongjiang Ice City	113,095	13,333	3,613	7,540	−17.3%
8	Shijiazhuang Gongfu	102,268	13,632	3,159	6,818	−30.9%
9	Guangzhou	84,448	7,951	3,896	5,630	−37.1%
10	Suzhou Dongwu	82,618	8,368	2,618	5,508	+115.3%
11	Foshan Nanshi	58,449	7,738	2,462	3,897	+288.5%
12	Nanjing City	43,182	4,918	1,299	2,879	−1.5%
13	Jiangxi Lushan	38,314	7,681	1,021	2,554	−19.9%
14	Qingdao Red Lions	27,381	3,660	836	1,825	+12.9%^{†}
15	Wuxi Wugo	24,835	3,118	528	1,656	+2.5%
16	Shanghai Jiading Huilong	17,704	1,796	695	1,180	+1.3%
	League total	2,284,702	60,951	528	9,520	+71.7%

Notes:
^{†} Teams played previous season in CL2.
