= Clube Atlético Pirassununguense =

Pirassununguense
- Full name: Clube Atlético Pirassununguense
- Founded: September 7, 1907
- Dissolved: CAP; Ceapezão; Gigante do Vale
- Ground: BDN, Pirassununga, São Paulo state, Brazil
- Capacity: 5,300
Home colours	Away colours

Clube Atlético Pirassununguense, commonly known as Pirassununguense, is a currently inactive Brazilian football club based in Pirassununga, São Paulo state.

== History ==
The club was founded on September 1, 1907. Pirassununguense won the Campeonato Paulista do Interior in 1954.

The entire football history of the city of Pirassununga necessarily passes through Clube Atlético Pirassununguense. Traditional Mogiana team, and one of the oldest in the country, CAP has always been in the disputes promoted by the São Paulo leagues.

== Achievements ==
- Campeonato Paulista do Interior:
  - Winners (1): 1954

== Stadium ==
Clube Atlético Pirassununguense play their home games at Estádio Belarmino Del Nero, nicknamed BDN. The stadium has a maximum capacity of 5,300 people.
