= 2017 Dalian Yifang F.C. season =

Dalian Yifang F.C.
- Chairman: Shi Fenghe
- Manager: Juan Ramón López Caro
- Stadium: Dalian Sports Center
- League One: 1st (promoted)
- FA Cup: Third round
- Top goalscorer: League: Nyasha Mushekwi; Yannick Boli (16 each); All: Nyasha Mushekwi; Yannick Boli (16 each)
- Highest home attendance: 43,159
- Lowest home attendance: 11,061
- Average home league attendance: 20,596
Home colours	Away colours

The 2017 Dalian Yifang F.C. season was the eighth season in club history.

Dalian Yifang won the League One title, and will be able to compete again in the Chinese top-tier league next season, after a 3-year-absence.

== Squad ==
=== First team squad ===
As of 1 July 2017

Note: Flags indicate national team as defined under FIFA eligibility rules; some limited exceptions apply. Players may hold more than one non-FIFA nationality.

No.	Pos.	Nation	Player
1	GK	CHN	Zhang Chong
2	DF	CHN	Wang Wanpeng (vice captain)
3	DF	CHN	Cao Xuan
4	DF	CHN	Li Shuai
5	DF	ARG	Jonathan Ferrari
6	MF	CHN	Zhu Xiaogang
7	MF	CHN	Li Zhendong
8	MF	CHN	Zhu Ting (captain)
9	FW	ZIM	Nyasha Mushekwi
10	FW	CIV	Yannick Boli
11	MF	CHN	Sun Guowen
12	DF	CHN	Zhou Ting
13	DF	CHN	Wang Yaopeng
14	MF	CHN	Qu Xiaohui
15	MF	CHN	Jin Qiang

No.	Pos.	Nation	Player
17	FW	CHN	Yan Peng
19	GK	CHN	Yu Ziqian
20	MF	CHN	Wang Jinxian
21	MF	CHN	Liu Yingchen
23	GK	CHN	Chen Junlin
24	MF	CHN	Han Xu
26	MF	CHN	Cui Ming'an
27	DF	CHN	Shan Pengfei
28	DF	CHN	Du Yuxin
29	MF	CHN	Sun Bo
30	DF	CHN	Han Xuegeng
32	DF	CHN	Dong Yanfeng
33	FW	CHN	Zhao Xuebin
36	FW	CHN	Dong Honglin

- Zhu Ting was no longer the captain after his suspension, Wang Wanpeng was responsible for the rest of the season.

=== Reserve squad ===
Note: Flags indicate national team as defined under FIFA eligibility rules; some limited exceptions apply. Players may hold more than one non-FIFA nationality.

No.	Pos.	Nation	Player
41	GK	CHN	Sun Wancheng
42	GK	CHN	Li Xinyu
43	MF	CHN	Li Zhen
44	DF	CHN	Wang Qianshuo
45	DF	CHN	Fu Yuncheng
47	MF	CHN	Yuan Hao
49	DF	CHN	Zhang Yuning

No.	Pos.	Nation	Player
50	FW	CHN	Xie Hui
51	MF	CHN	Liu Yang
52	MF	CHN	Song Xiaoyu
53	MF	CHN	Zhao Zaiping
54	MF	CHN	Meng Xiangbin
55	MF	CHN	Tian Lianbin
58	MF	CHN	Wang Junhao

== Coaching staff ==
As of 2017 season

Position	Name
Head coach	(Spain) Juan Ramón López Caro
Assistant coach	(Spain) Lorenzo Antolinez
Goalkeeping coach	(China) Han Wenhai
Fitness coach	(Spain) Cédric Thyus
Team doctor	(Spain) Ramón Marín
Technique coach	(Morocco) Abdelkader Charii
Youthcoach	(China) Pei Yongjiu

== Transfers ==
It's been reported that they have met with Samuel Eto'o, but finally signed Yannick Boli from Anzhi Makhachkala. For domestic players, Sun Guowen, who claimed his contract with Aerbin was illegal and refused to renew it, has returned after the local court judged the contract to be valid.

=== In ===
No.	Pos.	Name	Age	Moving from	Type	Transfer Window	Transfer fee	Notes	Ref.
12	DF	(China) Zhou Ting	38	(China) Beijing Guoan	Transfer	Winter	—	—	
21	MF	(China) Liu Yingchen	24	(China) Dalian Transcendence	Transfer	Winter	—	—	
24	MF	(China) Han Xu	28	(China) Dalian Transcendence	Transfer	Winter	€1.35M	—	
5	DF	(Argentina) Jonathan Ferrari	29	(Argentina) Club Atlético Patronato	Transfer	Winter	—	—	
10	FW	(Ivory Coast) Yannick Boli	29	(Russia) Anzhi Makhachkala	Transfer	Winter	Undisclosed	—	
	DF	(China) Duan Yunzi	22	(China) Shenyang Urban	Loan Return	Winter	—	—	
	MF	(Romania) Constantin Budescu	26	(Romania) Astra Giurgiu	Loan Return	Winter	—	—	

=== Out ===
No.	Pos.	Name	Age	Moving to	Type	Transfer Window	Transfer fee	Notes	Ref.
11	FW	(Sierra Leone) Mohamed Bangura	26	(Sweden) Dalkurd FF	Released	Winter	—	—	
32	DF	(China) Eddy Francis	21	(Portugal) Boavista	Transfer	Winter	—	—	
22	MF	(Liberia) Seykou Oliseh	27	—	Released	Winter	—	—	
	MF	(Romania) Constantin Budescu	26	(Romania) Astra Giurgiu	Transfer	Winter	—	—	
	MF	(China) Zhang Hui	23	(China) Shaanxi Chang'an Athletic	Loan	Winter	—	—	
	MF	(China) Duan Yunzi	23	(China) Shenyang Urban	Loan	Winter	—	—	
46	MF	(China) Yang Fangzhi	22	(China) Dalian Transcendence	Loan	Summer	—	—	
48	MF	(China) Wu Yuyin	27	(China) Yinchuan Helanshan	Loan	Summer	—	—	

== Kits ==
Home
Away
Goalkeeper
Home
Goalkeeper
Away

== Preseason ==
=== Training matches ===
3 January 2017 Friendly	Dalian Yifang	1–0	Hebei Elite	Kunming, Yunnan
	Sun Bo

13 January 2017 Friendly	Dalian Yifang	1–0	Zhejiang Yiteng	Kunming, Yunnan
	Zhao Xuebin

18 January 2017 Friendly	Dalian Yifang	2–0	Chengdu Qbao	Kunming, Yunnan
	Yan Peng; Zhang Hui

22 January 2017 Friendly	Dalian Yifang	1–1	Dalian Transcendence	Kunming, Yunnan

8 February 2017 Friendly	Dalian Yifang	1–1	Elche CF Ilicitano	Oliva, Spain

11 February 2017 Friendly	Dalian Yifang	0–1	UTA Arad	Oliva, Spain

14 February 2017 Friendly	Dalian Yifang	3–1	FC St. Gallen II	Oliva, Spain
	Zhao Xuebin 9'; ? o.g.'; Mushekwi 68'

17 February 2017 Friendly	Dalian Yifang	3–0	TSV Buchbach	Oliva, Spain
	Han Xu 9'; Zhao Xuebin 51'; Mushekwi 90'

21 February 2017 Friendly	Dalian Yifang	4–0	FC Dinamo Brest	Oliva, Spain
	Mushekwi 35', 75'; Zhao Xuebin 45', 54'

23 February 2017 Friendly	Dalian Yifang	2–0	CD Castellón	Oliva, Spain

== China League One ==
=== Review ===
Dalian Yifang signed Spanish manager Juan Ramón López Caro before the season. The team will aim to gain promotion back to the Super League.

Juan Caro brought an effective strategy based on high pressing, long pass and quick counterattack, while the team significantly improved defence tactics by signing Jonathan Ferrari and Zhou Ting. Dalian Yifang achieved four consecutive winnings at the beginning of the season, and won 8 matches out of the first 10. By May, they were the team with the best defense, with only 5 goals conceded.

After beating Shenzhen F.C. on 7 May, Dalian Yifang went top for the first time within 708 days, since they led the league at the beginning of 2015 season. During the match, Shenzhen F.C. player Wang Dalong committed a rude foul to Nyasha Mushekwi, causing considerable damage to his right leg. After a 4–0 victory against Yunnan Lijiang F.C. on 18 June, Yifang ensured its position as the Summer Champion, with two matches yet to compete.

During the match with Xinjiang Tianshan Leopard, Mushekwi scored the 100th goal since the team was occupied by Dalian Yifang. The gap between them and Beijing Renhe came to 9 points after the match, but was reduced to 2 points after losing the second-leg match with Beijing Renhe, and their record of remain undefeated for 18 matches in a row was also terminated.

Yannick Boli scored the first hat trick in squad this season against Shanghai Shenxin on 23 September.

After winning the derby against Dalian Transcendence on 15 October, Yifang ensured a promotion back to the Chinese top-tier league, after competing 3 seasons (1078 days approximately) in China League One. Congratulatory messages were sent by both Dalian municipal government and Sun Xishaung, owner of the team. On 21 October, as Beijing Renhe was beaten by Hohhot Zhongyou, Dalian Yifang was led to the league title.

Dalian Yifang U17 Team claimed the title of 2017 China League One elite reserve team league on 21 November(Chinese: 2017中甲俱乐部精英梯队联赛).

=== League table ===
Pos	Team	Pld	W	D	L	GF	GA	GD	Pts	Promotion, qualification or relegation
1	Dalian Yifang (C, P)	30	19	7	4	48	23	+25	64	Promotion to Super League
2	Beijing Renhe (P)	30	18	8	4	48	21	+27	62	Promotion to Super League
3	Shijiazhuang Ever Bright	30	14	12	4	48	34	+14	54	
4	Qingdao Huanghai	30	16	4	10	56	40	+16	52	
5	Wuhan Zall	30	13	8	9	47	40	+7	47	

Updated to match(es) played on 28 October 2017. Source: League table
Rules for classification: 1) Points; 2) Head-to-head points; 3) Head-to-head goal difference; 4) Head-to-head goals scored; 5) Reserve league points; 6) Goal difference; 7) Goals scored; 8) Disciplinary points (1 point for each yellow card, 3 points for each red card); 9) Draw
(C) Champions; (P) Promoted

=== Results summary ===
Overall								Home						Away					
Pld	W	D	L	GF	GA	GD	Pts	W	D	L	GF	GA	GD	W	D	L	GF	GA	GD
30	19	7	4	48	23	+25	64	9	3	3	23	12	+11	10	4	1	25	11	+14

Last updated: 28 October 2017.
Source: See Results

=== Position by round ===
Team ╲ Round	1	2	3	4	5	6	7	8	9	10	11	12	13	14	15	16	17	18	19	20	21	22	23	24	25	26	27	28	29	30
Dalian Yifang	2	2	2	2	2	2	2	1	1	1	1	1	1	1	1	1	1	1	1	1	1	1	1	1	1	1	1	1	1	1

=== League fixtures and results ===
Fixtures as of 24 February 2017. Some fixtures may be adjusted if necessary.

	Date	Time		H/A	Opponent	Res.F–A	Att.	Goalscorers and disciplined players		Location	Stadium	Report
	Date	Time		H/A	Opponent	Res.F–A	Att.	Dalian Yifang	Opponent	Location	Stadium	Report
1	11 Mar	Saturday	15:00	A	Meizhou Hakka	2–0	6,855	Wang Wanpeng 39'; Sun Guowen (yellow card) 43'; Nyasha Mushekwi 60'; Jin Qiang (yellow card) 63'	Gibril Sankoh (yellow card) 57'; Luo Xi (yellow card) 87'	Meizhou	Wuhua County Stadium	
2	16 Mar	Thursday	19:00	A	Beijing BG	2–0	4,152	Jin Qiang (yellow card) 23'; Mushekwi 60', 63'	Cheick Tioté (yellow card) 6'; Zou Zhongting (yellow card) 57'	Beijing	Olympic Sports Centre (Beijing)	
3	2 Apr	Sunday	15:30	H	Zhejiang Yiteng	1–0	18,021	Yannick Boli 36'; Zhu Ting (yellow card) 68'	Liu Yue (yellow card) 58'; Hao Qiang (yellow card) 72'; Li Xin (yellow card) 74'	Dalian	Dalian Sports Center	
4	9 Apr	Sunday	15:30	H	Qingdao Huanghai	2–1	17,820	Li Shuai 2'; Nyasha Mushekwi 48'; Sun Guowen (yellow card) 78'; Zhang Chong (yellow card) 87'	Joan Verdú 17'; Fan Lingjiang (yellow card) 54'; Zhao Shi (red card) 61'	Dalian	Dalian Sports Center	
5	16 Apr	Sunday	16:30	A	Xinjiang Tianshan Leopard	0–1	3,721	Zhou Ting (yellow card) 21'; Yannick Boli (yellow card) 67'; Jonathan Ferrari (yellow card) 75'	Wu Peng 19'; Vicente (yellow card) 85'; Arapat (yellow card) 86'; Babacar Gueye (yellow card) 87'; Zhou Heng (yellow card) 90+1'; Shewket Yalqun (yellow card) 90+2'	Ürümqi	Xinjiang Sports Centre	
6	23 Apr	Sunday	19:00	H	Wuhan Zall	1–0	16,861	Zhao Xuebin 44'; Wang Jinxian (yellow card) 81'; Mushekwi (yellow card) 90+1' (penalty missed) 90+2	—	Dalian	Dalian Sports Center	
7	30 Apr	Sunday	19:35	A	Shijiazhuang Ever Bright	2–2	13,533	Cui Ming'an (yellow card) 36'; Nyasha Mushekwi 41', 44'; Li Shuai (yellow card) 57'; Zhu Ting (yellow card) 60'; Jonathan Ferrari (yellow card) 82'	Matheus 31'; Wang Peng (yellow card) 44'; Adriano 70' (pen.); Lü Jianjun (yellow card) 87'	Shijiazhuang	Yutong Sports Center	
8	7 May	Sunday	15:30	H	Shenzhen F.C.	2–1	22,691	Nyasha Mushekwi 4', 69' (penalty missed) 89	Cui Min (yellow card) 10'; Zhang Jiaqi (yellow card) 23'; Tan Binliang (yellow card) 55'; Wang Dalong (yellow card) 61'; Preciado (yellow card) 66', (goal) 86' (pen.)	Dalian	Dalian Sports Center	
9	14 May	Sunday	15:30	A	Beijing Renhe	Postponed for security of the Belt and Road forum in Beijing.				Beijing	Beijing Fengtai Stadium	
10	21 May	Sunday	19:00	H	Nei Mongol Zhongyou	1–0	13,221	Zhu Xiaogang 31'; Jin Qiang (yellow card) 38'; Zhou Ting (yellow card) 43'	Zhu Zilin (yellow card) 4'	Dalian	Dalian Sports Center	
11	28 May	Sunday	19:35	A	Hangzhou Greentown	1–1	4,575	Zhu Xiaogang (yellow card) 29'; Sun Guowen (yellow card) 64'; Wang Jinxian 75'; Yannick Boli (yellow card) 88'	Chen Xiao (yellow card) 31'; Tong Lei (yellow card) 55'; Anselmo Ramon 90+3'	Hangzhou	Huanglong Stadium	
12	4 Jun	Sunday	19:00	H	Shanghai Shenxin	2–2	15,231	Jonathan Ferrari (yellow card) 44'; Nyasha Mushekwi 49' (penalty missed) 90; Yannick Boli 50'; Zhu Xiaogang (yellow card) 55'	Biro Biro 5' (yellow card) 75'; Gu Bin 32'; Raúl Rodríguez (yellow card) 90+2'	Dalian	Dalian Sports Center	
13	10 Jun	Saturday	15:30	A	Dalian Transcendence	4–2	15,772	Sun Guowen 14'; Jonathan Ferrari 24'; Yannick Boli 54'; Zhao Xuebin 87'	Hu Zhaojun 28'; Ivan Božić 31' (yellow card) 31'; Liu Yuchen (yellow card) 42'; Zhao Yibo (yellow card) 45'	Dalian	Jinzhou Stadium	
14	18 Jun	Sunday	19:00	H	Yunnan Lijiang	4–0	11,061	Yannick Boli 15', 62' (pen.) (yellow card) 49'; Wang Jinxian 38'; Wang Wanpeng 82'	Gao Furong (yellow card) 24'	Dalian	Dalian Sports Center	
15	24 Jun	Saturday	19:30	A	Baoding Yingli ETS	3–1	6,813	Nyasha Mushekwi (yellow card) 16' (goal) 28', 40'; Sun Guowen (yellow card) 65'; Yannick Boli 80'	John Owoeri 30'; Li Yan (yellow card) 68'; Wang Hanbing (yellow card) 89'	Baoding	Langfang Stadium	
16	2 Jul	Sunday	19:00	H	Meizhou Hakka	1–1	15,831	Wang Jinxian (yellow card) 40'; Yannick Boli (penalty missed) 18' 46' (red card) 55'; Wang Wanpeng (yellow card) 45+1'; Zhou Ting (red card) 78'	Huo Liang (yellow card) 18'; Japa (yellow card) 39'; Yao Junsheng 57' (pen.)	Dalian	Dalian Sports Center	
17	9 Jul	Sunday	19:00	H	Beijing BG	1–0	16,001	Li Shuai (yellow card) 4'; Jonathan Ferrari 58' (yellow card) 80'; Sun Guowen (yellow card) 90+2'	Liu Yi (yellow card) 81'; Wen Chih-hao (yellow card) 90+1'	Dalian	Dalian Sports Center	
18	15 Jul	Saturday	19:00	A	Zhejiang Yiteng	1–0	2,836	Sun Bo (yellow card) 26'; Shan Pengfei (yellow card) 57'; Nyasha Mushekwi 73'	Wang Kai (yellow card) 30'; Guto (yellow card) 70'	Shaoxing	Shaoxing China Textile City Sports Center	
19	22 Jul	Saturday	19:30	A	Qingdao Huanghai	1–1	8,726	Zhu Xiaogang (yellow card) 6'; Nyasha Mushekwi 19'; Jonathan Ferrari (yellow card) 34'; Jin Qiang (yellow card) 48'	Yang Yun (yellow card) 44'; Bari Mamatil 53'	Qingdao	Guoxin Gymnasium	
9	29 Jul	Saturday	19:30	A	Beijing Renhe	1–0	11,243	Zhu Xiaogang (yellow card) 24'; Jin Qiang (yellow card) 51'; Yannick Boli 59'; Zhou Ting (yellow card) 66'	Luo Xin (yellow card) 49'	Beijing	Beijing Fengtai Stadium	
20	6 Aug	Sunday	19:00	H	Xinjiang Tianshan Leopard	4–0	20,331	Jin Qiang (yellow card) 15'; Nyasha Mushekwi 18'; Yannick Boli 50', 58'; Cui Ming'an 90+1'	Zhou Heng (yellow card) 28'	Dalian	Dalian Sports Center	
21	12 Aug	Saturday	19:30	A	Wuhan Zall	1–1	11,131	Zhou Ting 5' (pen.); Wang Wanpeng (yellow card) 44'; Shan Pengfei (yellow card) 70'	Marcelo Moreno 16'; Li Chao (yellow card) 57'; Huang Bowen (yellow card) 86'	Wuhan	Wuhan Sports Center	
22	20 Aug	Sunday	19:00	H	Shijiazhuang Ever Bright	2–2	26,126	Jin Qiang (yellow card) 16'; Shan Pengfei (yellow card) 18'; Yannick Boli 25'; Nyasha Mushekwi 61'; Zhu Ting (yellow card) 80'	Jiao Zhe (yellow card) 59'; Matheus 74'; Lü Jianjun (yellow card) 83'; Jacob Mulenga 90'; Shao Puliang (yellow card) 90+5'	Dalian	Dalian Sports Center	
23	26 Aug	Saturday	19:35	A	Shenzhen F.C.	1–0	9,291	Han Xu (yellow card) 18'; Jonathan Ferrari (yellow card) 47'; Wang Wanpeng 62'	Du Longquan (yellow card) 33'	Shenzhen	Shenzhen Stadium	
24	3 Sep	Sunday	19:00	H	Beijing Renhe	0–2	28,961	Jin Qiang (yellow card) 23'; Sun Bo (yellow card) 57'; Yannick Boli (yellow card) 79'	Cao Yongjing (yellow card) 21'; Shi Liang (yellow card) 31'; Ivo 59'; Wan Houliang 82'	Dalian	Dalian Sports Center	
25	9 Sep	Saturday	19:35	A	Nei Mongol Zhongyou	1–0	10,032	Jin Qiang (yellow card) 28'; Nyasha Mushekwi 23'; Zhou Ting (yellow card) 45'; Zhu Xiaogang (yellow card) 75'; Han Xu (yellow card) 89'; Li Shuai (yellow card) 72' (yellow-red card) 90'	Davi (penalty missed) 12'; Zhang Tianlong (yellow card) 36'; Duan Jieyi (yellow card) 90'	Hohhot	Hohhot City Stadium	
26	17 Sep	Sunday	19:00	H	Hangzhou Greentown	0–1	18,631	Shan Pengfei (yellow card) 76'; Zhu Xiaogang (yellow card) 90+4'	Anselmo Ramon (yellow card) 37'; Denílson Gabionetta 61'; Ge Zhen (yellow card) 88'; Luo Jing (yellow card) 90+2'; Zou Dehai (yellow card) 90+3'; Denílson Gabionetta (yellow card) 90+4'	Dalian	Dalian Sports Center	
27	23 Sep	Saturday	15:45	A	Shanghai Shenxin	4–2	3,796	Yannick Boli 20', 81', 90'; Zhou Ting 61' (pen.); Jonathan Ferrari (yellow card) 79'; Wang Wanpeng (yellow card) 86'; Sun Guowen (yellow card) 86'	Raúl Rodríguez 47'; Cleiton Silva 80' (pen.)	Shanghai	Jinshan Sports Centre	
28	15 Oct	Sunday	15:30	H	Dalian Transcendence	2–1	24,981	Yannick Boli (yellow card) 13' (goal) 14'; Jin Qiang (yellow card) 23'; Jonathan Ferrari (yellow card) 24'; Zhu Xiaogang (yellow card) 45'; Zhao Xuebin 81'; Li Shuai (yellow card) 89'	Wang Hongyou (penalty missed) 20'; Fan Peipei 32'; Liu Yusheng (yellow card) 47'; Sheng Jun (yellow card) 89'; Zhao Yibo (yellow card) 90+4'	Dalian	Dalian Sports Center	
29	21 Oct	Saturday	14:30	A	Yunnan Lijiang	1–0	2,781	Shan Pengfei (yellow card) 38'; Zhou Ting (yellow card) 63'; Yannick Boli (yellow card) 75' (goal) 80'	—	Lijiang	Lijiang Stadium	
30	28 Oct	Saturday	14:30	H	Baoding Yingli ETS	0–1	43,159	Sun Bo (yellow card) 80'	Du Junpeng (yellow card) 43'; Di You (yellow card) 63'; John Owoeri 90+3'	Dalian	Dalian Sports Center	

== Chinese FA Cup ==
=== FA Cup fixtures and results ===
As of 3 May 2017

20 April 2017 2	Yancheng Dafeng	0–0 (4 – 5 p)	Dalian Yifang	Yancheng, Jiangsu
15:00				Stadium: Yancheng Dafeng Olympic Sports Centre; Attendance: 327; Referee: Liang Caiwei
	Penalties
	Wang Peng (penalty scored)		(penalty scored) Shan Pengfei; (penalty scored) Sun Guowen; (penalty scored) Han Xu; (penalty scored) Li Shuai; (penalty scored) Zhu Xiaogang

3 May 2017 3	Dalian Yifang	0–2	Tianjin Quanjian	Dalian, Liaoning
15:30		Report	Júnior Moraes 52', 77'	Stadium: Dalian Sports Center; Attendance: 2,621; Referee: Ma Li

== Squad statistics ==
=== League performance data ===
As of 28 October.

No.	Pos.	Name	Nat.	Age	China League One					Note
No.	Pos.	Name	Nat.	Age	App.	Goals	Booked	(yellow card) (red card)	Sent off (straight red)	Note
1	GK	Zhang Chong	(China)	29	30	0	1	0	0	
19	GK	Yu Ziqian	(China)	32	0	0	0	0	0	
23	GK	Chen Junlin	(China)	24	-	-	-	-	-	Not in squad
5	CB	Jonathan Ferrari	(Argentina)	30	27	2	8	0	0	
8	RB	Zhu Ting	(China)	32	24	0	3	0	0	
27	RB	Shan Pengfei	(China)	24	23	0	5	0	0	
2	CB	Wang Wanpeng	(China)	35	30	3	3	0	0	
3	CB	Cao Xuan	(China)	32	0	0	0	0	0	
12	LB	Zhou Ting	(China)	38	25	2	5	0	1	
13	CB	Wang Yaopeng	(China)	22	1	0	1	0	0	
30	LB	Han Xuegeng	(China)	28	-	-	-	-	-	Not in squad
32	LB	Dong Yanfeng	(China)	21	1	0	0	0	0	
15	DM	Jin Qiang	(China)	24	28	0	10	0	0	
26	AM	Cui Ming'an	(China)	22	19	1	1	0	0	
6	DM	Zhu Xiaogang	(China)	29	24	1	7	0	0	
24	CM	Han Xu	(China)	29	21	0	2	0	0	
7	CM	Li Zhendong	(China)	27	-	-	-	-	-	Not in squad
14	CM	Qu Xiaohui	(China)	30	-	-	-	-	-	Not in squad
21	LM	Liu Yingchen	(China)	24	1	0	1	0	0	
28	CM	Du Yuxin	(China)	24	-	-	-	-	-	Not in squad
36	CM	Dong Honglin	(China)	21	-	-	-	-	-	Not in squad
9	CF	Nyasha Mushekwi	(Zimbabwe)	30	29	16	2	0	0	
10	CF	Yannick Boli	(Ivory Coast)	29	24	16	6	0	1	
20	LW	Wang Jinxian	(China)	21	29	2	2	0	0	
11	RW	Sun Guowen	(China)	23	27	1	4	0	0	
29	RW	Sun Bo	(China)	26	20	0	3	0	0	
4	LW	Li Shuai	(China)	22	16	1	1	1	0	
33	CF	Zhao Xuebin	(China)	24	13	3	0	0	0	
17	ST	Yan Peng	(China)	22	-	-	-	-	-	Not in squad
25	ST	Li Yuqiu	(China)	21	-	-	-	-	-	Not in squad
Total										

=== Suspensions ===
Zhu Ting received a severe 7-match suspension because he spitted at the referee and misbehaved during the handshake, after the match against Shijiazhuang Ever Bright on 30 April. Zhou Ting and Boli both received a Red Card during the match against Meizhou Hakka on 2 July. Jin Qiang was the first player in squad to be suspended twice for accumulating four Yellow Cards. During the match with Beijing Renhe, Sun Bo committed a rude tackle, causing an ankle fracture for Ayub Masika, and received a 2-match suspension consequently.

Player	No. of matches served	Reason	Date served	Opponent(s)	Ref.
Zhu Ting	7	Spitting at referee, unfinished ritual after the match against Shijiazhuang Yongchang	-	-	
Sun Guowen	1	Four Yellow Cards	2 July	Meizhou Hakka	
Zhou Ting	1	Red Card vs. Meizhou Hakka	9 July	Beijing Renhe	
Yannick Boli	1	Red Card vs. Meizhou Hakka	9 July	Beijing Renhe	
Jin Qiang	1	Four Yellow Cards	15 July	Zhejiang Yiteng	
Jonathan Ferrari	1	Four Yellow Cards	15 July	Zhejiang Yiteng	
Zhu Xiaogang	1	Four Yellow Cards	6 August	Xinjiang Leoaprd	
Jin Qiang	1	Four Yellow Cards	26 August	Shenzhen F.C.	
Sun Bo	2	Violent tackle	-	-	
Yannick Boli	1	Four Yellow Cards	9 September	Nei Mongol Zhongyou	
Li Shuai	1	Red Card vs. Nei Mongol Zhongyou	17 September	Hangzhou Greentown	
Zhou Ting	1	Four Yellow Cards	17 September	Hangzhou Greentown	
Shan Pengfei	1	Four Yellow Cards	23 September	Shanghai Shenxin	
Jonathan Ferrari	1	Four Yellow Cards	21 October	Yunnan Lijiang	
