= 2016 Dalian Yifang F.C. season =

Dalian Yifang F.C.
- Chairman: Shi Xueqing; Lin Lefeng
- Manager: Mikael Stahre; Milinko Pantić; Sergio Piernas Cárdenas
- Stadium: Dalian Sports Center
- League One: 5th
- FA Cup: 3rd round
- Top goalscorer: Nyasha Mushekwi (19 goals)
- Highest home attendance: 20,392
- Lowest home attendance: 2,532
- Average home league attendance: 10,806
Home colours	Away colours

The 2016 Dalian Yifang F.C. season was the seventh season in club history.

== Background ==
Before the season, Yifang announced that Mikael Stahre will continue his job. The team and the manager himself claimed that the team will try to gain promotion into the 2017 Chinese Super League.

In July 2016, Yifang made changes of critical personnel including chairman and technical staffs, replacing their manager Mikael Stahre with Milinko Pantić from Atletico Madrid B, and signed Lin Lefeng as the chairman, hoping to improve their performance, but it failed. After just 8 matches, Pantić was replaced with Sergio Piernas Cárdenas, his assistant coach.

== Kits ==
Home
Away
Goalkeeper
home
Goalkeeper
away

== Friendlies ==
=== Preseason ===
18 February 2016 Friendly	Elche CF	2–1	Dalian Yifang
	Nikos Vergos; Sergio León		Mushekwi 17'

25 February 2016 Friendly	Sarpsborg 08	4–1	Dalian Yifang
	Jonas Lindberg 36' (pen.); Patrick Mortensen 43'; Alexy Bosetti 84', 90'		Budescu 37'

27 February 2016 Friendly	FC Dynamo Saint Petersburg	1–1	Dalian Yifang
			Budescu 15' (pen.)

1 March 2016 Friendly	FC Dynamo Saint Petersburg	2–2	Dalian Yifang
			Mushekwi; Sun Bo

== China League One ==
=== League table ===
Pos	Team	Pld	W	D	L	GF	GA	GD	Pts
3	Qingdao Huanghai	30	19	2	9	52	42	+10	59 (Note: Head-to-head points: Tianjin Quanjian 9 pts, Guizhou Hengfeng Zhicheng 6 pts, Qingdao Huanghai 3 pts.)
4	Beijing Renhe	30	15	4	11	49	35	+14	49
5	Dalian Yifang	30	14	3	13	43	44	−1	45
6	Wuhan Zall	30	12	7	11	31	33	−2	43
7	Nei Mongol Zhongyou	30	12	5	13	37	35	+2	41 (Note: Head-to-head results: Nei Mongol 1–0 Beijing Enterprises Group, Beijing Enterprises Group 0–0 Nei Mongol.)

Updated to match(es) played on 22 October 2016. Source: sports.sina.com
Rules for classification: 1) Points; 2) Head-to-head points; 3) Head-to-head goal difference; 4) Head-to-head goals scored; 5) Goal difference; 6) Goals scored; 7) Disciplinary points (1 point for each yellow card, 3 points for each red card)

=== Dalian Derby ===
Yifang had experienced local derby back in the 2012 season against Dalian Shide, in the Chinese Super League. However, Shide was disbanded after the 2012 season. In this season, Yifang saw chances to compete with an alternate local team Dalian Transcendence. Yifang won by 2–0 in the first leg, but lost by 1–2 later.

=== Results summary ===
Overall								Home						Away					
Pld	W	D	L	GF	GA	GD	Pts	W	D	L	GF	GA	GD	W	D	L	GF	GA	GD
30	14	3	13	43	44	−1	45	9	1	5	25	16	+9	5	2	8	18	28	−10

Last updated: 22 October 2016.
Source: See Results

=== League fixtures and results ===
12 March 2016 1	Dalian Yifang	2 – 0	Zhejiang Yiteng	Dalian
Saturday 14:30	Zhu Xiaogang (yellow card) 51'; Sun Bo 56', (yellow card) 70'; Mohamed Bangura 87'		Adam Hughes (yellow card) 48'; Li Xin (yellow card) 72'	Stadium: Dalian Sports Center; Attendance: 15,392; Referee: Chen Xin

20 March 2016 2	Dalian Yifang	0 – 2	Hunan Billows	Dalian
Sunday 14:30	Li Shuai (yellow card) 68' (yellow-red card) 90+3'		Li Xiang 45+2'; Luis Carlos Cabezas 69'	Stadium: Dalian Sports Center; Attendance: 14,341; Referee: Shen Yinhao

3 April 2016 3	Dalian Yifang	1 – 1	Beijing Enterprises	Dalian
Sunday 15:30	Eddy Francis (yellow card) 32'; Sun Bo 50'		Yan Xiangchuang (yellow card) 32'; Wen Chih-hao (yellow card) 61'; Chen Hao-Wei 89'	Stadium: Dalian Sports Center; Attendance: 13,000; Referee: Dong Kun

10 April 2016 4	Dalian Transcendence	0 – 2	Dalian Yifang	Dalian
Sunday 15:00	Erton Fejzullahu (yellow card) 43'; Zhang Jian (yellow card) 65'; Xue Ya'nan (yellow card) 76'		Nyasha Mushekwi 26'; Eddy Francis (yellow card) 48'; Cao Xuan 77'	Stadium: Jinzhou Stadium; Attendance: 17,721; Referee: Luo Haitao

16 April 2016 5	Dalian Yifang	2 – 0	Nei Mongol Zhongyou	Dalian
Saturday 15:30	Cao Xuan 15'; Li Zhendong 46'; Zhu Xiaogang (yellow card) 85'; Mohamed Bangura (yellow card) 90+3'		Jonas Salley (yellow card) 41'	Stadium: Dalian Sports Center; Attendance: 10,352; Referee: Qiu Zhaojun

23 April 2016 6	Shenzhen F.C.	0 – 1	Dalian Yifang	Shenzhen
Saturday 15:00	Ren Peng (yellow card) 23'		Sun Bo (yellow card) 13'; Nyasha Mushekwi 63'; Eddy Francis (yellow card) 64'	Stadium: Shenzhen Stadium; Attendance: 10,851; Referee: Liu Xiufeng

1 May 2016 7	Dalian Yifang	0 – 1	Qingdao Jonoon	Dalian
Sunday 15:30	Eddy Francis (yellow card) 28'; Nyasha Mushekwi (yellow card) 33'		Sun Xu (yellow card) 6'; Wang Wei 51'; Guo Liang (yellow card) 57' (yellow-red card) 58'; Wang Jianwen (yellow card) 68'	Stadium: Dalian Sports Center; Attendance: 18,631; Referee: Wang Wei

8 May 2016 8	Shanghai Shenxin	2 – 3	Dalian Yifang	Shanghai
Sunday 15:30	Liu Chao 28'; Zhao Zuojun (yellow card) 32'; Daniel Chima Chukwu 45+1'; Jiang Jiajun (yellow card) 51'		Sun Bo 21'; Jin Qiang (yellow card) 42'; Zhu Ting (yellow card) 53'; Ye Chongqiu 62' (o.g.); Nyasha Mushekwi 77'	Stadium: Jinshan Sports Centre; Attendance: 6,832; Referee: Liu Xiufeng

15 May 2016 9	Dalian Yifang	4 – 0	Wuhan Zall	Dalian
Sunday 19:00	Nyasha Mushekwi 13', 46'; Mohamed Bangura 50'; Sun Bo 58' (yellow card) 61'		Zhou Liao (yellow card) 29' (yellow-red card) 45'; Qiu Tianyi (yellow card) 50'	Stadium: Dalian Sports Center; Attendance: 16,661; Referee: Yang Kaizi

22 May 2016 10	Beijing Renhe	2 – 0	Dalian Yifang	Beijing
Sunday 16:30	Chen Jie (yellow card) 17'; Zhu Baojie 27'; Wang Qiang 52'; Zhang Lie (yellow card) 79'		Eddy Francis (yellow card) 19'; Cao Xuan (yellow card) 76'	Stadium: Beijing Fengtai Stadium; Attendance: 6,151; Referee: Xia Jun

29 May 2016 11	Xinjiang Tianshan Leopard	2 – 1	Dalian Yifang	Urumqi
Sunday 18:00	Nusmir Fajić 33'; Itaparica 60' (yellow card) 89'; Rudnei (yellow card) 90+1'		Nyasha Mushekwi 32'; Wang Wanpeng (yellow card) 83'; Zhu Ting (yellow card) 84'; Li Zhendong (yellow card) 86'	Stadium: Xinjiang Sports Centre; Attendance: 3,821; Referee: Ma Ye

3 June 2016 12	Dalian Yifang	2 – 1	Tianjin Quanjian	Dalian
Friday 19:00	Nyasha Mushekwi 68'; Zhao Xuebin 87' (yellow card) 87'		Luis Fabiano 31'; Geuvânio (yellow card) 52'; Zheng Dalun (yellow card) 79'	Stadium: Dalian Sports Center; Attendance: 16,661; Referee: Luo Haitao

11 June 2016 13	Guizhou Zhicheng	0 – 0	Dalian Yifang	Guiyang
Saturday 15:00	Mazola (yellow card) 79'		Li Shuai (red card) 65'; Sun Bo (yellow card) 70'; Zhao Xuebin (yellow card) 78'	Stadium: Guiyang Olympic Sports Center; Attendance: 8,753; Referee: Jin Jingyuan

19 June 2016 14	Dalian Yifang	2 – 0	Meizhou Kejia	Dalian
Sunday 19:35	Nyasha Mushekwi 51', 70'; Wu Yuyin (yellow card) 57' (yellow-red card) 90+1'			Stadium: Dalian Sports Center; Attendance: 8,521; Referee: Qiu Zhaojun

26 June 2016 15	Qingdao Huanghai	5 – 2	Dalian Yifang	Qingdao
Sunday 19:30	Ma Long 4'; Wan Houliang 16'; Jiang Tao 61'; Wan Houliang (yellow card) 63'; Gao Xiang (yellow card) 73'; Martí Crespí 79'; Liu Peng (yellow card) 82'; Godfred Karikari 83'		Zhu Xiaogang (yellow card) 14'; Cui Ming'an 18'; Sun Bo (yellow card) 59'; Nyasha Mushekwi 69'	Stadium: Qingdao Guoxin Stadium; Attendance: 7,592; Referee: Shen Yinhao

2 July 2016 16	Zhejiang Yiteng	2 – 3	Dalian Yifang	Shaoxing
Saturday 19:00	Rodrigo Paulista (yellow card) 40'; Li Jian (yellow card) 50'; Yu Tao (yellow card) 55'; Ricardo Steer 66'; Li Xudong (yellow card) 90+3' (yellow-red card); Rodrigo Paulista 90+3'		Nyasha Mushekwi 40'; Cao Xuan (yellow card) 44'; Sun Bo 57'; Cui Ming'an (yellow card) 59'; Jin Qiang (yellow card) 62'; Wang Jinxian 85'	Stadium: China Textile City Sports Center; Attendance: 1,851; Referee: Jin Jingyuan

9 July 2016 17	Hunan Billows	0 – 2	Dalian Yifang	Yiyang
Saturday 19:35	Liu Yusheng (yellow card) 22'; Xie Weichao (yellow card) 40'; Li Zhaonan (yellow card) 55'		Sun Bo 9'; Zhu Xiaogang (yellow card) 21'; Nyasha Mushekwi 56'	Stadium: Yiyang Stadium; Attendance: 1,751; Referee: -

17 July 2016 18	Beijing Enterprises	3 – 0	Dalian Yifang	Beijing
Sunday 19:35	Nikola Vujadinovic (yellow card) 40'; Tang Jiashu 43'; Rubin Okotie 45+1'; Wang Cun (yellow card) 49'; Wen Chih-hao 83'; Jin Hui (yellow card) 90+1'		Li Shuai (yellow card) 38'; Jin Qiang (yellow card) 88'	Stadium: Olympic Sports Centre (Beijing); Attendance: 3,565; Referee: Liang Caiwei

23 July 2016 19	Dalian Yifang	1 – 2	Dalian Transcendence	Dalian
Saturday 19:30	Wang Wanpeng 3'; Sun Bo (yellow card) 89'; Cao Xuan (yellow card) 90+1'		Zhang Gong 50'; William Paulista 59'; Zhao Yibo (yellow card) 90+2'	Stadium: Dalian Sports Center; Attendance: 20,392; Referee: Xing Qi

31 July 2016 20	Nei Mongol Zhongyou	1 – 0	Dalian Yifang	Hohhot
Sunday 19:35	Dorielton (yellow card) 16'; Wan Yunlong 53'; Han Fangteng (yellow card) 72'		Zhu Xiaogang (yellow card) 10'; Sun Bo (yellow card) 16'; Li Shuai (yellow card) 16'; Cao Xuan (yellow card) 60'	Stadium: Hohhot City Stadium; Attendance: 12,483; Referee: Cu Chunhan

7 August 2016 21	Dalian Yifang	2 – 0	Shenzhen F.C.	Dalian
Sunday 19:00	Zhu Xiaogang (yellow card) 41'; Wang Wanpeng (yellow card) 43'; Zhao Xuebin 45+2', 64'; Li Shuai (yellow card) 67'; Mohamed Bangura (yellow card) 90+3'		Lü Zheng (yellow card) 11' (yellow-red card) 69'	Stadium: Dalian Sports Center; Attendance: 8,302; Referee: Shen Yinhao

14 August 2016 22	Qingdao Jonoon	1 – 1	Dalian Yifang	Qingdao
Sunday 15:30	Wang Wei 50'; Johnny (yellow card) 86'		Shan Pengfei (yellow card) 42'; Nyasha Mushekwi 75'; Qu Xiaohui (yellow card) 87'	Stadium: Qingdao Tiantai Stadium; Attendance: 1,268; Referee: Xu Fuxin

21 August 2016 23	Dalian Yifang	4 – 3	Shanghai Shenxin	Dalian
Sunday 19:00	Cui Ming'an (yellow card) 22' (goal) 56'; Nyasha Mushekwi 38', 74', 90+2'; Wu Yuyin (yellow card) 45'; Mohamed Bangura (yellow card) 90'		Li Shuai 7' (o.g.); Davi 60'; Zhang Yudong (yellow card) 68'; Biro Biro 69'; Zhang Yi'nuo (red card) 71'; Davi (yellow card) 88'	Stadium: Dalian Sports Center; Attendance: 8,231; Referee: Niu Minghui

27 August 2016 24	Wuhan Zall	4 – 0	Dalian Yifang	Wuhan
Saturday 19:35	Sam Jonson 13', 79'; Yang Chaosheng 23'; Sölvi Ottesen (yellow card) 36'; Huang Bowen (yellow card) 45+2'; Huang Fengtao (yellow card) 49'; Yao Hanlin 84'		Wang Jinxian (yellow card) 36'; Jin Qiang (yellow card) 40'; Mohamed Bangura (yellow card) 61'; Cui Ming'an (yellow card) 68'; Qu Xiaohui (yellow card) 77'	Stadium: Xinhua Road Stadium; Attendance: 2,653; Referee: Huang Xiang

4 September 2016 25	Dalian Yifang	1 – 3	Beijing Renhe	Dalian
Sunday 19:00	Nyasha Mushekwi (yellow card) 22'; Zhu Xiaogang (yellow card) 23'; Cui Ming'an (yellow card) 33'; Zhu Ting 53'; Li Zhendong (yellow card) 83'		Wang Gang 7'; Shi Liang 11'; Zhang Yuan 20'; Shi Liang (yellow card) 51'; Sun Jihai (yellow card) 72'; Shen Tianfeng (yellow card) 86'	Stadium: Dalian Sports Center; Attendance: 3,122; Referee: Gu Chunhan

11 September 2016 26	Dalian Yifang	1 – 0	Xinjiang Tianshan Leopard	Dalian
Sunday 19:00	Qu Xiaohui 35'		Vicente (yellow card) 34'; Nusmir Fajić (yellow card) 35'; Abdul'eziz Abdusalam (yellow card) 77'; Rudnei (yellow card) 81'; Wang Kang (yellow card) 88'	Stadium: Dalian Sports Center; Attendance: 2,842; Referee: Xia Jun

18 September 2016 27	Tianjin Quanjian	2 – 1	Dalian Yifang	Tianjin
Sunday 19:45	Luis Fabiano 39', 68'; Wang Jie (yellow card) 41'; Jádson (yellow card) 63'		Nyasha Mushekwi (yellow card) 10'; Dong Yanfeng (yellow card) 37'; Qu Xiaohui 47'; Zhang Chong (yellow card) 57'	Stadium: Haihe Educational Football Stadium; Attendance: 10,773; Referee: Ma Li

24 September 2016 28	Dalian Yifang	2 – 0	Guizhou Zhicheng	Dalian
Saturday 15:30	Dong Yanfeng 17' (yellow card) 66'; Zhu Xiaogang (yellow card) 45'; Wu Yuyin (yellow card) 87'; Nyasha Mushekwi 90+2'		Yves Ekwalla Herman (yellow card) 13'; Jiang Liang (yellow card) 90+5'	Stadium: Dalian Sports Center; Attendance: 3,108; Referee: Zhang Long

15 October 2016 29	Meizhou Kejia	4 – 2	Dalian Yifang	Meizhou
Saturday 14:30	Ouyang Xue 16', 89'; Japa 59' (pen.), 73' (yellow card) 73'		Nyasha Mushekwi 56'; Zhu Ting (yellow card) 58'; Mohamed Bangura 81'; Sun Bo (yellow card) 89'	Stadium: Wuhua County Stadium; Attendance: 8,939; Referee: Luo Haitao

22 October 2016 30	Dalian Yifang	1 – 3	Qingdao Huanghai	Dalian
Saturday 14:30	Wu Yuyin (yellow card) 12'; Qu Xiaohui (red card) 47'; Zhu Ting (yellow card) 48'; Nyasha Mushekwi 61'		Đorđe Rakić 36', 41'; Jiang Tao (yellow card) 60'; Martí Crespí (yellow card) 77'; Yuri 85'	Stadium: Dalian Sports Center; Attendance: 2,532; Referee: Li Pan

== Chinese FA Cup ==
=== FA Cup fixtures and results ===
12 April 2016 2	Baoding Yingli ETS	0 – 2	Dalian Aerbin	Baoding
15:30 CST			Zhang Hui 53'; Zhao Xuebin 73'	Stadium: Baoding People's Stadium; Attendance: 2,568; Referee: Li Zheng

11 May 2016 3	Dalian Aerbin	2 – 2 (2–4 p)	Henan Jianye	Dalian
16:00 CST	Zhao Xuebin 13'; Bangura 40'		Maitijiang 18', 45'	Stadium: Dalian Sports Center; Attendance: 2,016; Referee: Shen Yinhao
	Penalties
	Bangura (penalty scored); Cui Ming'an (penalty missed); Zhao Xuebin (penalty scored); Wu Yuyin (penalty missed)		(penalty scored) Ivo; (penalty missed) Yin Hongbo; (penalty scored) Maitijiang; (penalty scored) Sow; (penalty scored) Gomes

== Player information ==
=== Transfers ===
==== In ====
No.	Pos.	Name	Age	Moving from	Type	Transfer Window	Transfer fee	Notes	Ref.
10	MF	(Romania) Constantin Budescu	26	(Romania) Astra Giurgiu	Transfer	Winter	€1.5M	—	
11	FW	(Sierra Leone) Mohamed Bangura	26	(Sweden) AIK	Transfer	Winter	€0.8M	—	
3	DF	(China) Cao Xuan	30	(China) Hangzhou Greentown	Transfer	Winter	—	—	
7	MF	(China) Li Zhendong	25	(China) Beijing Enterprises	Transfer	Winter	—	—	
4	DF	(China) Li Shuai	20	(Portugal) Mafra U19	Transfer	Winter	—	—	
14	MF	(China) Qu Xiaohui	28	(China) Shenyang Urban	Transfer	Winter	—	—	
5	DF	(China) Wu Yuyin	25	(China) Shanghai SIPG Reserves	Transfer	Winter	—	—	
9	FW	(Zimbabwe) Nyasha Mushekwi	29	(South Africa) Sundowns	Transfer	Winter	—	—	
	DF	(China) Ji Zhengyu	21	(China) Dalian Transcendence	Loan Return	Winter	—	—	
	FW	(China) Nan Yunqi	22	(China) Dalian Transcendence	Loan Return	Winter	—	—	
22	MF	(Liberia) Seykou Oliseh	26	(Romania) Astra Giurgiu	Transfer	Summer	—	—	

==== Out ====
No.	Pos.	Name	Age	Moving to	Type	Transfer Window	Transfer fee	Notes	Ref.
21	DF	(China) Yue Xin	19	(China) Hangzhou Greentown	Transfer	Winter	€575,000	—	
13	GK	(China) Liu Weiguo	23	(China) Guangzhou Evergrande	Transfer	Winter	€150,000	—	
9	FW	(Brazil) Bruno Meneghel	28	(Japan) Cerezo Osaka	Transfer	Winter	—	—	
	DF	(China) Ji Zhengyu	21	(China) Hunan Billows	Transfer	Winter	—	—	
21	MF	(China) Liu Yingchen	23	(China) Dalian Transcendence	Transfer	Winter	—	—	
3	DF	(Sweden) Niklas Backman	27	(Denmark) Aarhus GF	Transfer	Winter	—	—	
5	DF	(China) Zou You	30	(China) Shaanxi Chang'an Athletics	Transfer	Winter	—	—	
	MF	(China) Nan Yunqi	22	(China) Dalian Transcendence	—	Winter	—	—	
22	FW	(China) Duan Yunzi	21	(China) Shenyang Urban	Loan	Winter	—	—	
11	FW	(Sweden) Mathias Ranégie	31	(England) Watford	End of loan	Winter	—	—	
10	MF	(China) Chen Tao	31	—	Released	Winter	—	—	
10	MF	(Romania) Constantin Budescu	26	(Romania) Astra Giurgiu	Loan	Summer	—	—	

=== Squad ===
As of 4 March 2016

Note: Flags indicate national team as defined under FIFA eligibility rules; some limited exceptions apply. Players may hold more than one non-FIFA nationality.

No.	Pos.	Nation	Player
1	GK	CHN	Zhang Chong
2	DF	CHN	Wang Wanpeng
3	DF	CHN	Cao Xuan (captain)
4	DF	CHN	Li Shuai
5	DF	CHN	Wu Yuyin
6	MF	CHN	Zhu Xiaogang
7	MF	CHN	Li Zhendong
8	MF	CHN	Zhu Ting
9	FW	ZIM	Nyasha Mushekwi
10	MF	ROU	Constantin Budescu
11	FW	SLE	Mohamed Bangura
12	FW	CHN	Zhao Xuebin
14	MF	CHN	Qu Xiaohui
15	MF	CHN	Jin Qiang
16	FW	CHN	Xie Hui

No.	Pos.	Nation	Player
17	MF	CHN	Zhang Hui
18	FW	CHN	Wang Jinxian
19	GK	CHN	Yu Ziqian
21	MF	CHN	Dong Honglin
22	FW	LBR	Sekou Oliseh (from June)
23	GK	CHN	Chen Junlin
26	MF	CHN	Cui Ming'an
27	DF	CHN	Shan Pengfei
29	MF	CHN	Sun Bo
30	DF	CHN	Han Xuegeng
31	DF	CHN	Wang Yaopeng
32	DF	CHN	Eddy Francis
42	DF	CHN	Dong Yanfeng
43	DF	CHN	Li Zhen

=== Goalscorers ===
Rank	Player	No.	Pos.	League One	FA Cup	Total
1	(Zimbabwe) Nyasha Mushekwi	9	FW	19	0	19
2	(China) Sun Bo	29	MF	6	0	6
3	(Sierra Leone) Mohamed Bangura	11	FW	3	1	4
3	(China) Zhao Xuebin	12	FW	3	2	5
5	(China) Cao Xuan	3	DF	2	0	2
5	(China) Cui Ming'an	26	MF	2	0	2
5	(China) Qu Xiaohui	14	MF	2	0	2
8	(China) Zhu Ting	8	DF	1	0	1
8	(China) Wang Wanpeng	2	DF	1	0	1
8	(China) Li Zhendong	7	MF	1	0	1
8	(China) Wang Jinxian	18	MF	1	0	1
8	(China) Dong Yanfeng	42	DF	1	0	1
8	(China) Zhang Hui	17	MF	0	1	1
Own goals				1	0	1

=== Assists ===
Rank	Player	No.	Pos.	League One	FA Cup	Total
1	(China) Wang Jinxian	18	MF	8	0	8
2	(China) Sun Bo	29	MF	6	0	6
3	(China) Cui Ming'an	26	MF	4	0	4
4	(Zimbabwe) Nyasha Mushekwi	9	FW	3	0	3
4	(China) Zhu Ting	8	DF	3	0	3
6	(China) Li Zhendong	7	MF	2	0	2
6	(China) Cao Xuan	3	DF	2	0	2
8	(Sierra Leone) Mohamed Bangura	11	FW	1	0	1
8	(China) Qu Xiaohui	14	MF	1	0	1
8	(China) Zhao Xuebin	12	FW	1	1	2
8	(Liberia) Sekou Oliseh	22	MF	1	0	1
8	(Romania) Constantin Budescu	10	MF	1	0	1
