= 2014 Dalian Aerbin F.C. season =

Dalian Aerbin F.C.
- Chairman: Chi Shangbin
- Manager: Ma Lin; Yasuharu Kurata
- Stadium: Dalian Sports Center
- Super League: 15th, relegated
- FA Cup: 3rd round
- Top goalscorer: Bruno Meneghel (12 goals)
- Highest home attendance: 22,118
- Lowest home attendance: 6,222
- Average home league attendance: 10,993

The 2014 Dalian Aerbin F.C. season is the fifth season in club history, and the third season in the Chinese Super League.

== Background ==
Aerbin signed Ma Lin from Liaoning F.C. as their manager. He was soon replaced by reserve team manager Yasuharu Kurata in May due to the team's poor performance, however the performance was actually connected to insufficient budget as reported.

After the failure to take over Dalian Shide F.C. last season, Aerbin faced serious financial problems, since the debt, facilities and training ground of Dalian Shide were merged into Aerbin, but players in squad were judged as free agent by the CFA, and Aerbin had to follow normal transfer routine to sign them, rather than simply taking over the whole team. It's been reported that the team was unable to pay up salaries and bonuses for more than 10 months under the fact that they had already began to sell valuable players for some budget. Additionally, Aerbin was investigated by FIFA for violating contract with former player Leon Benko. The team ended up 15th by the end of the season, relegated to China League One.

== Chinese Super League ==
=== League table ===
Pos	Team	Pld	W	D	L	GF	GA	GD	Pts	Qualification or relegation
12	Hangzhou Greentown	30	8	8	14	43	60	−17	32 (Note: Changchun 2–3 Hangzhou; Hangzhou 1–1 Changchun)	
13	Changchun Yatai	30	8	8	14	33	40	−7	32	
14	Henan Jianye	30	6	12	12	32	39	−7	30	
15	Dalian Aerbin (R)	30	6	11	13	32	45	−13	29	Relegation to League One
16	Harbin Yiteng (R)	30	5	6	19	35	56	−21	21	Relegation to League One

Source: Chinese Super League (in Chinese)
Rules for classification: 1st points; 2nd head-to-head points; 3rd head-to-head goal difference; 4th head-to-head goals scored; 5th reserve league points; 6th goal difference; 7th goals scored; 8th disciplinary points (1 point for each yellow card, 3 points for each red card).
(R) Relegated

=== League fixtures and results ===
	Date	Time	H/A	Opponent	Res.F–A	Att.	Goalscorers and disciplined players		Location	Stadium	Report
	Date	Time	H/A	Opponent	Res.F–A	Att.	Dalian Aerbin	Opponent	Location	Stadium	Report
1	Sat Mar 8	18:35	A	Hangzhou Greentown	1–1	13,637	Yang Boyu (yellow card) 24'; Bruno Meneghel 59'	Wang Song 18'	Hangzhou	Hangzhou Huanglong Stadium	Report
2	Sat Mar 15	15:30	H	Beijing Guoan	0–1	22,118	Lü Peng (yellow card) 56'	Pablo Batalla 51'	Dalian	Dalian Sports Center	Report
3	Sat Mar 22	19:30	A	Henan Jianye	2–2	20,998	Leon Benko 60'; Bruno Meneghel 65' (yellow card) 55'	Ryan Johnson 45'; Huang Xiyang 51' (yellow card) 55'	Zhengzhou	Zhengzhou Hanghai Stadium	Report
4	Sat Mar 29	15:30	H	Changchun Yatai	2–1	12,818	Bruno Meneghel 9'; Lü Peng (yellow card) 41'; Yu Hanchao (yellow card) 48'; Song Zhenyu 60'(o.g.)	Eninho 5' (yellow card) 90+3'; Lü Jianjun (yellow card) 11'; Walter Iglesias (yellow card) 13'; Li Xiaoting (yellow card) 37'; Jiang Zhe (yellow card) 78'; Liu Weidong (yellow card) 83'	Dalian	Dalian Sports Center	Report
5	Sun Apr 6	20:00	A	Guangzhou Evergrande	2–4	36,541	Yu Hanchao 3', 69'; Li Xuepeng (yellow card) 6'; Lü Peng (yellow card) 74'	Kim Young-Gwon 13'; Elkeson 34', 90+3' (yellow card) 89'; Dong Xuesheng 79'	Guangzhou	Tianhe Stadium	Report
6	Sun Apr 13	19:45	A	Shanghai Shenhua	0–2	10,806	Li Xuepeng (yellow card) 22'; Yu Dabao (yellow card) 23'; Yang Boyu (yellow card) 72'	Giovanni Moreno 16', 74' (yellow card) 23'	Shanghai	Hongkou Stadium	Report
7	Sun Apr 20	16:30	H	Shanghai SIPG	1–1	12,312	Zhao Honglüe (yellow card) 11'; Bruno Meneghel 11'; Li Xuepeng (yellow card) 50'	Ransford Addo (yellow card) 10'; Wang Shenchao 31'; Cai Huikang (yellow card) 59'; Daniel McBreen (yellow card) 60'; Fu Huan (yellow card) 90'	Dalian	Dalian Sports Center	Report
8	Sat Apr 26	19:30	A	Guangzhou R&F	0–3	11,033	Chen Tao (red card) 36'; Bruno Meneghel (yellow card) 38'; Lü Peng (yellow card) 62'	Wang Xiaolong (yellow card) 26'; Davi 34', 72'; Tang Miao (yellow card) 45'; Jiang Ning 48'; Park Jong-Woo (yellow card) 54'	Guangzhou	Yuexiushan Stadium	Report
9	Wed Apr 30	16:30	H	Guizhou Renhe	1–1	11,112	Bruno Meneghel 80'	Zhang Chenglin (yellow card) 33'; Hyuri 44'; Zhang Lie (yellow card) 61'	Dalian	Dalian Sports Center	Report
10	Sat May 3	19:30	A	Shandong Luneng	2–1	20,132	Yu Hanchao 19' (yellow card) 81'; Sun Bo 40' (yellow card) 80'; Lü Peng (yellow card) 19'; Zhang Jiaqi (yellow card) 68'; Leon Benko (yellow card) 90+2'	Wang Qiang (yellow card) 36'; Han Peng (yellow card) 42'; Aloísio 63'; Júnior Urso (yellow card) 68'; Du Wei (yellow card) 72'	Jinan	Jinan Olympic Sports Center Stadium	Report
11	Sun May 11	19:00	H	Harbin Yiteng	3–1	6,222	Yu Dabao (yellow card) 5'; Bruno Meneghel 77'; Zhao Honglüe (yellow card) 84'; Yu Hanchao 90+3'	Li Xudong 31'(o.g.) (yellow card) 44'; Han Deming (yellow card) 49'; Ricardo Steer 89'	Dalian	Dalian Sports Center	Report
12	Sun May 18	19:35	A	Jiangsu Sainty	0–1	20,345	Jin Pengxiang (yellow card) 23'; Zhang Jiaqi (yellow card) 38'; Lü Peng (yellow card) 48'	Ji Xiang 63'; Deng Xiaofei (yellow card) 71'	Nanjing	Nanjing Olympic Sports Center	Report
13	Wed May 21	19:00	H	Tianjin TEDA	2–3	6,818	Yu Hanchao 37'; Chen Tao (yellow card) 58'; Zhou Tong 89'	Lima 50'; Zhou Haibin 71'; Du Zhenyu 80' (yellow card) 88'	Dalian	Dalian Sports Center	Report
14	Sun May 25	16:30	A	Liaoning Whowin	0–0	10,281	—	—	Panjin	Liaoning Panjin Stadium	Report
15	Sun Jul 20	19:00	H	Shanghai Shenxin	2–1	6,806	Niklas Backman 56'; Lü Peng (yellow card) 58'; Yu Dabao 76'; Zhao Honglüe (red card) 87'	Lim You-Hwan (yellow card) 35'; Jiang Jiajun (yellow card) 39'; Zhang Hao (yellow card) 70'; Zhao Zuojun 90+3'	Dalian	Dalian Sports Center	Report
16	Sat Jul 26	19:00	H	Hangzhou Greentown	1–1	7,808	Zhu Xiaogang 31'	Wu Wei 5'; Anselmo Ramon (yellow card) 65'	Dalian	Dalian Sports Center	Report
17	Wed Jul 30	19:30	A	Beijing Guoan	1–4	38,609	Eddy Francis (yellow card) 64'; Bruno Meneghel 67'	Zhang Chengdong (yellow card) 20'; Piao Cheng 57'; Erton Fejzullahu 74', 86'; Chen Zhizhao 90+4' (yellow card) 90+5'	Beijing	Workers' Stadium	Report
18	Sun Aug 3	19:00	H	Henan Jianye	1–1	8,901	Yu Dabao 10' (yellow card) 50'	Li Jianbin (yellow card) 12'; Ryan Johnson (yellow card) 47'; Gu Cao (yellow card) 63'; Huang Xiyang 69'	Dalian	Dalian Sports Center	Report
19	Sat Aug 9	19:30	A	Changchun Yatai	1–1	15,261	Lü Peng (yellow card) 37'; Chen Tao (yellow card) 65'; Sun Bo 90'	Yang Xu 47'	Changchun	Development Area Stadium	Report
20	Wed Aug 13	19:00	H	Guangzhou Evergrande	1–2	18,921	Bruno Meneghel 64'; Jin Pengxiang (yellow card) 69'	Mei Fang (yellow card) 30'; Alberto Gilardino 56', 80'	Dalian	Dalian Sports Center	Report
21	Sun Aug 17	19:00	H	Shanghai Shenhua	0–1	10,279	Zhang Jiaqi (yellow card) 37'	Henrique 87'	Dalian	Dalian Sports Center	Report
22	Sat Aug 23	19:45	A	Shanghai SIPG	0–2	10,374	Tobias Hysén 24'; Wu Lei 33'	Yu Dabao (yellow card) 72'; Chen Tao (yellow card) 90+2'	Shanghai	Shanghai Stadium	Report
23	Sat Aug 30	19:00	H	Guangzhou R&F	0–0	6,812	—	—	Dalian	Dalian Sports Center	Report
24	Sat Sep 13	19:35	A	Guizhou Renhe	2–0	11,213	Esteban Solari (yellow card) 41'; Zhou Tong (yellow card) 59'; Jin Yangyang (yellow card) 79'; Zhang Jiaqi (yellow card) 84'; Bruno Meneghel 90', 90+2'	Yu Hai (yellow card) 72'	Guiyang	Guiyang Olympic Sports Center	Report
25	Sat Sep 20	19:00	H	Shandong Luneng	1–3	7,645	Niklas Backman 90+1'	Wang Tong (yellow card) 3'; Ryan McGowan 6'; Aloísio 21', 80'; Zhang Wenzhao (yellow card) 50'; Zheng Zheng (yellow card) 63'; Wang Dalei (yellow card) 89'	Dalian	Dalian Sports Center	Report
26	Sat Sep 27	16:30	A	Harbin Yiteng	1–0	21,800	Jin Qiang (yellow card) 19'; Yu Dabao (yellow card) 42'; Zhang Jiaqi (yellow card) 76'; Wang Jinxian (yellow card) 90+1'	Li Xudong 62'; Dori (yellow card) 90+2'	Harbin	Harbin International Conference Exhibition and Sports Center	Report
27	Sat Oct 4	19:00	H	Jiangsu Sainty	2–2	11,328	Zhou Tong 33'; Jin Qiang (yellow card) 60'; Yu Dabao (yellow card) 64'; Bruno Meneghel 90+1'	Roda Antar 31'; Edison Toloza 70'; Li Ang (yellow card) 80'	Dalian	Dalian Sports Center	Report
28	Sun Oct 19	19:35	A	Tianjin TEDA	1–2	9,926	Esteban Solari (yellow card) 30'; Zhou Tong (yellow card) 51' (goal) 57' (yellow card) 58' (red card)	Baré 41' (yellow card) 48'; Zhou Haibin (yellow card) 61'; Andrezinho 81'; Hui Jiakang (yellow card) 90'	Tianjin	Tianjin Olympic Center Stadium	Report
29	Sun Oct 26	15:35	H	Liaoning Whowin	1–2	14,990	Sun Bo (yellow card) 35'; Eddy Francis (yellow card) 41'; Chen Tao 55'; Niklas Backman (yellow card) 64'	James Chamanga 3', 73'; Sun Shilin (yellow card) 30'; Yang Yu (yellow card) 79'; Wang Liang (yellow card) 90+5'	Dalian	Dalian Sports Center	Report
30	Sun Nov 2	15:35	A	Shanghai Shenxin	1–1	8,714	Zhao Honglüe (yellow card) 70'; Esteban Solari (yellow card) 85'; Bruno Meneghel 86'	Ye Chongqiu (yellow card) 18'; Yu Tao 18'; Lim You-Hwan (yellow card) 70'; Jaílton Paraíba (yellow card) 90+2'	Shanghai	Jinshan Football Stadium	Report

== Chinese FA Cup ==
=== Cup fixtures and results ===
15 July 2014 3	Yanbian Baekdu	2 – 0	Dalian Aerbin	Yanji
15:00 CST	Serge Roland 19' (pen.), 77'			Stadium: Yanji Nationwide Fitness Centre Stadium; Attendance: 2,337; Referee: Wang Zhe

== Technical Staff ==
Position	Name
Head coach	(Japan) Yasuharu Kurata
Assistant coaches	(China) Jiang Feng (China) Zang Haili
Goalkeeper coach	(China) Han Wenhai
Fitness coach	(France) Fabien Joel Bossuet
Team doctor / Physiotherapist	(South Korea) Kwon Hyuck-Jun

== Player information ==
=== Transfers ===
==== In ====
No.	Pos.	Name	Age	Moving from	Type	Transfer Window	Transfer fee	Notes	Ref.
25	MF	(Iraq) Nashat Akram	29	(Iraq) Al-Shorta SC	Transfer	Winter	€550,000	—	
9	MF	(Croatia) Leon Benko	30	(Croatia) HNK Rijeka	Transfer	Winter	€1.0M	—	
28	DF	(China) Yue Xin	18	(China) Liaoning	Transfer	Winter	—	—	
11	FW	(Brazil) Bruno Meneghel	26	(China) Qingdao Jonoon	Transfer	Winter	—	—	
3	DF	(Sweden) Niklas Backman	25	(Sweden) AIK	Transfer	Winter	—	—	
30	DF	(China) Han Xuegeng	24	(China) Liaoning	Transfer	Winter	—	—	
23	GK	(China) Chen Junlin	20	—	Transfer	Winter	—	—	
39	MF	(China) Zhang Jiaqi	22	—	Transfer	Winter	—	—	
16	MF	(China) Nan Yunqi	20	(China) Shenyang Zhongze	Loan Return	Winter	—	—	
7	DF	(China) Zhao Honglüe	24	(China) Dalian Aerbin Reserves	—	Winter	—	—	
18	MF	(China) Wang Jinxian	17	(China) Dalian Aerbin Reserves	—	Winter	—	—	
15	MF	(China) Jin Qiang	20	(China) Dalian Aerbin Reserves	—	Winter	—	—	
21	DF	(China) Liu Yingchen	20	(China) Dalian Aerbin Reserves	—	Winter	—	—	
17	MF	(China) Quan Heng	24	(China) Dalian Aerbin Reserves	—	Winter	—	—	
31	DF	(China) Wang Yaopeng	18	(China) Dalian Aerbin Reserves	—	Winter	—	—	
26	MF	(China) Cui Ming'an	19	(China) Dalian Aerbin Reserves	—	Winter	—	—	
35	FW	(Argentina) Esteban Solari	34	(Greece) Skoda Xanthi	Transfer	Summer	—	—	
	DF	(Ghana) Lee Addy	23	(Croatia) Dinamo Zagreb	Loan Return	Winter	—	—	
	MF	(China) Jiang Wenjun	23	(China) Shenyang Zhongze	Transfer	Winter	—	—	
	MF	(China) Wang Shixin	20	(China) Qingdao Hainiu	Loan Return	Winter	—	—	
	MF	(China) Sun Haosheng	24	(China) Guizhou Zhicheng	Loan Return	Winter	—	—	

==== Out ====
No.	Pos.	Name	Age	Moving to	Type	Transfer Window	Transfer fee	Notes	Ref.
	FW	(Morocco) Nabir Baha	32	—	Released	Winter	—	—	
	DF	(Australia) Daniel Mullen	24	(Australia) Western Sydney	Transfer	Winter	—	—	
	DF	(Ghana) Lee Addy	23	(Croatia) Dinamo Zagreb	Transfer	Winter	—	—	
	DF	(China) Zhao Hejing	28	(China) Beijing Guoan	Transfer	Winter	—	—	
	DF	(China) Chen Lei	28	(China) Chongqing Lifan	Transfer	Winter	—	—	
	MF	(Mali) Seydou Keita	34	(Spain) Valencia CF	Transfer	Winter	—	—	
	DF	(China) Liu Yu	28	(China) Chongqing Lifan	Transfer	Winter	—	—	
	FW	(France) Hoarau	29	(France) Bordeaux	Transfer	Winter	—	—	
	MF	(China) Wang Jun	23	(China) Qingdao Jonoon	Transfer	Winter	—	—	
	MF	(China) Han Pengfei	20	(Portugal) Mafra U19	Transfer	Winter	—	—	
	FW	(China) Dong Xuesheng	24	(China) Guanghzou Evergrande	Transfer	Winter	—	—	
	MF	(China) Sun Haosheng	24	(China) Shijiazhuang Yongchang	Transfer	Winter	—	—	
	MF	(China) Jiang Wenjun	23	(China) Qingdao Hainiu	Transfer	Winter	—	—	
10	MF	(Brazil) Fábio Rochemback	32	—	Retired	Summer	—	—	
25	MF	(Iraq) Nashat Akram	29	(Iraq) Al-Shorta	Released	Summer	—	Contract terminated without permission, and Al-Shorta SC was ordered by FIFA to pay $805,000 compensation in August 2018.	
9	MF	(Croatia) Leon Benko	30	(Bosnia and Herzegovina) FK Sarajevo	—	Summer		—	
20	MF	(China) Yu Hanchao	27	(China) Guangzhou Evergrande	Transfer	Summer	€5.5M	—	
4	DF	(China) Li Xuepeng	25	(China) Guangzhou Evergrande	Transfer	Summer	€2.5M	—	

=== Squad ===
As of 5 March 2014

Note: Flags indicate national team as defined under FIFA eligibility rules; some limited exceptions apply. Players may hold more than one non-FIFA nationality.

No.	Pos.	Nation	Player
1	GK	CHN	Zhang Chong
2	DF	CHN	Yang Boyu
3	DF	SWE	Niklas Backman
4	DF	CHN	Li Xuepeng (→ Guangzhou Evergrande F.C. in July)
5	DF	CHN	Jin Pengxiang
6	MF	CHN	Zhu Xiaogang
7	DF	CHN	Zhao Honglue
8	MF	CHN	Lü Peng
9	FW	CRO	Leon Benko
10	MF	CHN	Chen Tao
11	FW	BRA	Bruno Meneghel
12	MF	CHN	Zhou Tong
13	GK	CHN	Liu Weiguo
15	MF	CHN	Jin Qiang
16	FW	CHN	Nan Yunqi
17	MF	CHN	Quan Heng
18	MF	CHN	Wang Jinxian

No.	Pos.	Nation	Player
19	GK	CHN	Zhang Zhenqiang
20	MF	CHN	Yu Hanchao (→ Guangzhou Evergrande F.C. in July)
21	DF	CHN	Liu Yingchen
22	MF	CHN	Yu Dabao
23	GK	CHN	Chen Junlin
24	DF	CHN	Ji Zhengyu
25	MF	IRQ	Nashat Akram
26	MF	CHN	Cui Ming'an
27	DF	CHN	Shan Pengfei
28	DF	CHN	Yue Xin
29	MF	CHN	Sun Bo
30	DF	CHN	Han Xuegeng
31	DF	CHN	Wang Yaopeng
32	DF	CHN	Eddy Francis
33	MF	CHN	Sun Guowen
35	FW	ARG	Esteban Solari (from July)
39	MF	CHN	Zhang Jiaqi
