= 2013 Dalian Aerbin F.C. season =

Dalian Aerbin F.C.
- Chairman: Li Ming
- Manager: Xu Hong (no matches); Li Ming (caretaker); Simo Krunić
- Stadium: Jinzhou Stadium
- Super League: 5th
- FA Cup: Semi-finals
- Top goalscorer: Yu Dabao (8 goals)
- Highest home attendance: 21,811
- Lowest home attendance: 2,760
- Average home league attendance: 10,538

The 2013 Dalian Aerbin F.C. season is the fourth season in club history, and the second season in the Chinese Super League.

== Overview ==
Before the season started, Aerbin tried to take over Dalian Shide F.C. after its downfall, after the local rival faced difficulties concerning political issue (see Xu Ming, owner of Dalian Shide for the time), but was eventually called off by the CFA.

Aerbin signed former football player Xu Hong as their manager in December 2012, but he resigned after only 62 days, because he was suspended by the CFA for manipulation match results years ago. Li Ming stepped up as the caretaker, before the team signed contract with Serbian manager Simo Krunić in June.

== Squad ==
As of 6 March 2013

Note: Flags indicate national team as defined under FIFA eligibility rules; some limited exceptions apply. Players may hold more than one non-FIFA nationality.

| No. | Pos. | Nation | Player |
|---|---|---|---|
| 1 | GK | CHN | Zhang Chong |
| 2 | DF | CHN | Yang Boyu |
| 3 | DF | CHN | Zhao Hejing |
| 4 | DF | CHN | Li Xuepeng |
| 5 | DF | CHN | Jin Pengxiang |
| 6 | MF | CHN | Zhu Xiaogang |
| 8 | MF | BRA | Fábio Rochemback |
| 9 | FW | FRA | Guillaume Hoarau |
| 10 | MF | CHN | Chen Tao |
| 11 | FW | NGR | Peter Utaka (→ Beijing Guoan in June) |
| 12 | MF | CHN | Zhou Tong |
| 13 | GK | CHN | Liu Weiguo |
| 15 | FW | MAR | Nabil Baha (from June) |
| 17 | GK | CHN | Zhang Zhenqiang |
| 19 | FW | CHN | Dong Xuesheng |
| 20 | MF | MLI | Seidou Keita |

| No. | Pos. | Nation | Player |
|---|---|---|---|
| 22 | MF | CHN | Yu Dabao |
| 23 | FW | CHN | Zhao Xuebin |
| 25 | DF | CHN | Shan Pengfei |
| 27 | DF | CHN | Liu Yu |
| 28 | DF | CHN | Chen Lei |
| 29 | MF | CHN | Sun Bo |
| 30 | MF | CHN | Sun Guowen |
| 31 | GK | CHN | Wang Jingping |
| 32 | DF | CHN | Eddy Francis |
| 34 | MF | CHN | Wang Jun |
| 35 | DF | CHN | Ji Zhengyu |
| 36 | MF | CHN | Cui Ming'an |
| 37 | MF | CHN | Jin Qiang |
| 38 | MF | CHN | Quan Heng |
| 40 | MF | CHN | Yu Hanchao |

== Technical Staff ==
| Position | Name |
|---|---|
| Head coach | (Serbia) Simo Krunić |
| Assistant coaches | (China) Shi Lei |
| Fitness coach | (France) Fabien Joel Bossuet |
| Team doctor / Physiotherapist | (South Korea) Kwon Hyuck-Jun (China) Li Hengjun |

== Chinese Super League ==
=== League table ===
| Pos | Team | Pld | W | D | L | GF | GA | GD | Pts | Qualification or relegation |
|---|---|---|---|---|---|---|---|---|---|---|
| 3 | Beijing Guoan | 30 | 14 | 9 | 7 | 54 | 31 | +23 | 51 | Qualification to Champions League qualifying round 3 |
| 4 | Guizhou Renhe (Note: Guizhou Renhe qualified for the 2014 AFC Champions League Group Stage from winning the 2013 Chinese FA Cup.) | 30 | 11 | 11 | 8 | 40 | 41 | −1 | 44 | Qualification to Champions League group stage |
| 5 | Dalian Aerbin | 30 | 11 | 8 | 11 | 40 | 43 | −3 | 41 | |
| 6 | Guangzhou R&F | 30 | 11 | 7 | 12 | 45 | 47 | −2 | 40 (Note: Guangzhou R&F 2–0 Shanghai Shenxin, Shanghai Shenxin 1–0 Guangzhou R&F) | |
| 7 | Shanghai Shenxin | 30 | 11 | 7 | 12 | 31 | 42 | −11 | 40 | |

Source: Chinese Super League (in Chinese)
Rules for classification: 1st points; 2nd head-to-head points; 3rd head-to-head goal difference; 4th head-to-head goals scored; 5th goal difference; 6th goals scored; 7th disciplinary points (1 point for each yellow card, 3 points for each red card). Head-to-Head: used when head-to-head record is used to rank tied teams.

=== Results summary ===
| Overall | | | | | | | | Home | | | | | | Away | | | | | |
| Pld | W | D | L | GF | GA | GD | Pts | W | D | L | GF | GA | GD | W | D | L | GF | GA | GD |
|---|---|---|---|---|---|---|---|---|---|---|---|---|---|---|---|---|---|---|---|
| 30 | 11 | 8 | 11 | 40 | 43 | −3 | 41 | 7 | 6 | 2 | 27 | 17 | +10 | 4 | 2 | 9 | 13 | 26 | −13 |

Last updated: 3 November 2013.
Source: See Results

=== League fixtures and results ===
| | Date | Time | H/A | Opponent | Res.F–A | Att. | Goalscorers and disciplined players | | Location | Stadium | Report |
| | Date | Time | H/A | Opponent | Res.F–A | Att. | Dalian Aerbin | Opponent | Location | Stadium | Report |
|---|---|---|---|---|---|---|---|---|---|---|---|
| 1 | Sat Mar 9 | 15:35 | A | Shandong Luneng | 0–1 | 23,738 | Zhu Xiaogang (yellow card) 62'; Zhao Hejing (yellow card) 90' | Roda Antar (yellow card) 22'; Yang Xu (yellow card) 71'; Cui Peng 76' (pen.); Wang Tong (yellow card) 81' | Jinan | Jinan Olympic Sports Center Stadium | Report |
| 2 | Sat Mar 16 | 15:35 | A | Qingdao Jonoon | 0–1 | 11,936 | Liu Yu (yellow card) 33' | Bruno Meneghel 11'; Quan Lei (yellow card) 39'; Guo Liang (yellow card) 67'; George Mourad (yellow card) 78' | Qingdao | Qingdao Tiantai Stadium | Report |
| 3 | Sat Mar 30 | 15:35 | H | Shanghai SIPG | 3–3 | 16,211 | Peter Utaka 22' (pen.), 34'; Guillaume Hoarau 51'; Chen Tao (yellow card) 69' | Zhu Zhengrong 19', 57'; Ibán Cuadrado (yellow card) 31'; Li Yunqiu (yellow card) 44'; Wang Shenchao (yellow card) 49'; Wu Lei 55' | Dalian | Jinzhou Stadium | Report |
| 4 | Sat Apr 6 | 16:35 | A | Wuhan Zall | 1–0 | 18,313 | Jin Pengxiang (yellow card) 27'; Seydou Keita (yellow card) 44' (goal) 77'; Liu Yu (yellow card) 82' | | Wuhan | Wuhan Sports Center Stadium | Report |
| 5 | Sun Apr 14 | 16:35 | H | Guangzhou Evergrande | 1–2 | 21,811 | Zhu Xiaogang (yellow card) 20'; Hoarau 73' | Zhang Linpeng (yellow card) 34'; Elkeson 50'; Lucas Barrios 65'; Muriqui (yellow card) 73' | Dalian | Jinzhou Stadium | Report |
| 6 | Fri Apr 19 | 19:35 | A | Jiangsu Sainty | 1–0 | 25,862 | Li Xuepeng 8'; Fabio Rochemback (yellow card) 9'; Liu Weiguo (yellow card) 84' | Qu Cheng (yellow card) 79' | Nanjing | Nanjing Olympic Sports Center | Report |
| 7 | Sat Apr 27 | 16:35 | H | Beijing Guoan | 3–0 | 11,222 | Yu Dabao 1' (yellow card) 37'; Yang Boyu (yellow card) 3'; Fabio Rochemback 57'; Seydou Keita 70' | Shao Jiayi (yellow card) 61'; Yu Yang (yellow card) 89' | Dalian | Jinzhou Stadium | Report |
| 8 | Sun May 5 | 19:35 | A | Guizhou Renhe | 1–2 | 18,639 | Yu Dabao 2'; Yu Hanchao (yellow card) 32'; Zhu Xiaogang (yellow card) 54' | Zlatan Muslimović 9' (yellow card) 10'; Yang Hao (yellow card) 19'; Qu Bo 27'; Xavier Chen (yellow card) 41'; Sun Jihai (yellow card) 52'; Nano (yellow card) 88' | Guiyang | Guiyang Olympic Sports Center | Report |
| 9 | Sat May 11 | 19:35 | H | Shanghai Shenxin | 1–2 | 10,389 | Yu Dabao 79'; Jin Pengxiang (yellow card) 84' | Antônio Flávio (yellow card) 23'; Kieza 40', 87'; Wang Jiayu (yellow card) 85' | Dalian | Jinzhou Stadium | Report |
| 10 | Sat May 18 | 19:35 | H | Changchun Yatai | 2–2 | 5,788 | Li Xuepeng (yellow card) 25'; Yu Dabao 51'; Seydou Keita 64' | Cao Tianbao (yellow card) 12'; Zhang Xiaofei (yellow card) 52'; Sun Jie (yellow card) 56' (goal) 69'; Jiang Zhe 90+1' | Dalian | Jinzhou Stadium | Report |
| 11 | Sat May 25 | 17:00 | A | Guangzhou R&F | 2–3 | 9,830 | Yu Hanchao 41'; Chen Tao (yellow card) 71'; Zhao Hejing (yellow card) 84'; Peter Utaka 86' | Jiang Ning 35', 64'; Zhang Shuo 56'; Li Jianhua (yellow card) 74' | Guangzhou | Yuexiushan Stadium | Report |
| 12 | Sat Jun 1 | 19:35 | H | Tianjin TEDA | 1–0 | 11,288 | Seydou Keita 76'; Zhang Chong (yellow card) 90+2' | Cao Yang (yellow card) 8'; Liao Bochao (yellow card) 46'; Zong Lei (yellow card) 65' | Dalian | Jinzhou Stadium | Report |
| 13 | Fri Jun 21 | 19:45 | A | Shanghai Shenhua | 0–0 | 10,245 | Zhou Tong (yellow card) 9'; Li Xuepeng (yellow card) 50'; Peter Utaka (yellow card) 65'; Seydou Keita (yellow card) 90+2' | Dady (yellow card) 59'; Bai Jiajun (yellow card) 70'; Wang Changqing (yellow card) 79'; Cao Yunding (yellow card) 88'; Dai Lin (yellow card) 90+2'; Firas Al-Khatib (yellow card) 90+4' | Shanghai | Hongkou Stadium | Report |
| 14 | Wed Jun 26 | 19:35 | A | Liaoning Whowin | 0–2 | 20,081 | Liu Yu (yellow card) 5'; Fabio Rochemback (yellow card) 61' | Wu Gaojun (yellow card) 21'; Zhang Ye (yellow card) 40'; Edu 45'; Wang Bo (yellow card) 49'; Miloš Trifunović 62' | Shenyang | Tiexi New District Sports Center | Report |
| 15 | Sun Jun 30 | 19:35 | A | Hangzhou Greentown | 4–3 | 11,385 | Peter Utaka 39', 45+2', 73', 90+4'; Chen Tao (yellow card) 83' | Tang Jiashu (yellow card) 13' (yellow-red card) 72'; Davy Claude Angan 34', 47'; Chen Zhongliu 45'; Song Zhiwei (yellow card) 79' | Hangzhou | Hangzhou Huanglong Stadium | Report |
| 16 | Sat Jul 6 | 19:00 | H | Shandong Luneng | 1–1 | 16,821 | Dong Xuesheng 86' | Yang Xu 28'; Roda Antar (yellow card) 34' | Dalian | Jinzhou Stadium | Report |
| 17 | Sat Jul 13 | 19:35 | H | Qingdao Jonoon | 3–3 | 13,580 | Yu Dabao 12'; Chen Tao (yellow card) 15' (yellow-red card) 90+1'; Hoarau 33'; Liu Yu (yellow card) 28'; Dong Xuesheng 41'; Zhao Hejing (yellow card) 61' | Xu Jingjie 18', 23'; Quan Lei (yellow card) 43'; Gabriel Melkam (yellow card) 49'; Zhu Shiyu (yellow card) 73'; Bruno Meneghel 85' | Dalian | Jinzhou Stadium | Report |
| 18 | Wed Jul 31 | 19:45 | A | Shanghai SIPG | 2–2 | 9,065 | Seydou Keita 32'; Daniel Mullen (yellow card) 52'; Zhao Hejing (yellow card) 65'; Sun Bo 75' | Li Yunqiu (yellow card) 19'; Daniel McBreen 26'; Wang Jiajie 50' | Shanghai | Shanghai Stadium | Report |
| 19 | Sat Aug 3 | 19:00 | H | Wuhan Zall | 3–0 | 10,212 | Yu Dabao 18'; Zhou Tong (yellow card) 37'; Chen Lei 46'; Seydou Keita 59'; Sun Bo 90+2' | Garra Dembélé (yellow card) 44' (yellow-red card) 53'; Li Wei (yellow card) 45' | Dalian | Jinzhou Stadium | Report |
| 20 | Mon Aug 12 | 20:00 | A | Guangzhou Evergrande | 0–3 | 39,474 | Chen Tao (yellow card) 16'; Hoarau (yellow card) 80' | Zhang Linpeng (yellow card) 24'; Muriqui 37'; Zheng Long (yellow card) 49'; Dario Conca 68'; Rong Hao 87' | Guangzhou | Tianhe Stadium | Report |
| 21 | Sat Aug 17 | 19:00 | H | Jiangsu Sainty | 1–0 | 12,360 | Li Xuepeng (yellow card) 14'; Zhao Hejing 17'; Sun Bo (yellow card) 61'; Yu Dabao (yellow card) 66'; Zhang Chong (yellow card) 69'; Daniel Mullen (yellow card) 86'; Wang Jun (yellow card) 88'; Yu Hanchao (yellow card) 90+2' (yellow-red card) | Ai Zhibo (yellow card) 6'; Eleílson (yellow card) 62' | Dalian | Jinzhou Stadium | Report |
| 22 | Sun Aug 25 | 19:35 | A | Beijing Guoan | 0–4 | 41,131 | Lü Peng (yellow card) 15'; Seydou Keita (yellow card) 35'; Yu Dabao (yellow card) 67'; Zhao Hejing (yellow card) 70'; Chen Lei (yellow card) 90' | Joffre Guerrón 22'; Zhang Xizhe 35', 73' (pen.); Shao Jiayi 86' | Beijing | Workers' Stadium | Report |
| 23 | Fri Aug 30 | 19:00 | H | Guizhou Renhe | 1–1 | 10,231 | Rochemback 14'; SunBo (yellow card) 22'; Seydou Keita (red card) 25'; Chen Lei (yellow card) 48'; Yu Hanchao (yellow card) 62' | Nano (yellow card) 4'; Zhang Chenglin 9'; Zvjezdan Misimović (yellow card) 26'; Li Chunyu (yellow card) 47'; Yu Hai (yellow card) 48'; Sun Jihai (yellow card) 65'; Xavier Chen (yellow card) 74' | Dalian | Jinzhou Stadium | Report |
| 24 | Sun Sep 15 | 16:35 | A | Shanghai Shenxin | 2–1 | 7,952 | Nabil Baha 31'; Daniel Mullen (yellow card) 36'; Zhao Hejing (yellow card) 57'; Yu Hancho 61' | Zhang Yonghai (yellow card) 7'; Kieza 12' (yellow card) 14'; Wang Jiayu (yellow card) 85' | Shanghai | Jinshan Football Stadium | Report |
| 25 | Sat Sep 21 | 19:35 | A | Changchun Yatai | 0–2 | 8,700 | Rochemback (yellow card) 36'; Li Xuepeng (yellow card) 90+3' | Isac 42'; Eninho 59' (yellow card) 85' | Changchun | Development Area Stadium | Report |
| 26 | Sat Sep 28 | 19:00 | H | Guangzhou R&F | 2–2 | 7,051 | Yu Dabao (yellow card) 17' (goal) 56', 76'; Zhao Hejing (yellow card) 44'Fabio Rochemback (yellow card) 89' | Davi (yellow card) 38'; Zhang Yuan 63' (yellow card) 90+2'; Lu Lin 71'; Xu Bo (yellow card) 77'; Zhang Yaokun (yellow card) 86' | Dalian | Jinzhou Stadium | Report |
| 27 | Sat Oct 5 | 19:35 | A | Tianjin TEDA | 0–2 | 20,768 | Li Xuepeng (yellow card) 48' (yellow-red card) 66'; Nabil Baha (yellow card) 66' | Cao Yang 43'; Li Weifeng (yellow card) 65'; Carmelo Valencia 76'; Du Zhenyu (yellow card) 89' | Tianjin | Tianjin Olympic Center Stadium | Report |
| 28 | Sat Oct 19 | 16:35 | H | Shanghai Shenhua | 1–0 | 5,120 | Zhao Hejing 51' | Giovanni Moreno (yellow card) 39'; Dai Lin (yellow card) 79' | Dalian | Jinzhou Stadium | Report |
| 29 | Wed Oct 30 | 15:35 | H | Liaoning Whowin | 3–1 | 3,220 | Yu Hanchao 6' (yellow card) 30'; Daniel Mullen (yellow card) 23'; Li Xuepeng (yellow card) 57'; Chen Tao 68'; Fabio Rochemback 75' | Yang Shanping 1' (yellow card) 62'; Miloš Trifunović (yellow card) 23'; Sun Shilin (yellow card) 30'; Zheng Tao (yellow card) 64'; Wu Gaojun (yellow card) 67' | Dalian | Jinzhou Stadium | Report |
| 30 | Sun Nov 3 | 15:35 | H | Hangzhou Greentown | 1–0 | 2,760 | Zhao Hejing (yellow card) 43'; Chen Lei (yellow card) 44'; Nabil Baha 68'; Jin Pengxiang (yellow card) 90+4' | — | Dalian | Jinzhou Stadium | Report |

== Chinese FA Cup ==
| 21 May 2013 3 | Dalian Aerbin | 2 – 0 | Tianjin Songjiang | Dalian |
| 19:00 CST | Dong Xuesheng 45+1'; Hoarau 62'; Sun Bo (yellow card) 83' | | Zhao Yingjie (yellow card) 29'; Wu Lei (yellow card) 59' | Stadium: Jinzhou Stadium; Attendance: 4,252; Referee: Zhang Miao |

| 10 July 2013 4 | Dalian Aerbin | 1 – 0 | Shandong Luneng | Dalian |
| 19:00 CST | Guillaume Hoarau 11' (yellow card) 39'; Seydou Keita (yellow card) 20'; Jin Pengxiang (yellow card) 36' | | Wang Yongpo (yellow card) 39'; Li Songyi (yellow card) 60'; Wang Qiang (yellow card) 83' | Stadium: Jinzhou Stadium; Attendance: 6,000; Referee: Li Jun |

| 7 August 2013 Quarter-finals | Jiangsu Sainty | 1 – 2 | Dalian Aerbin | Zhenjiang |
| 19:40 CST | Ai Zhibo (yellow card) 30'; Cristian Danalache (yellow card) 53'; Salihi 66' | | Guillaume Hoarau 9'; Sun Bo (yellow card) 89'; Chen Tao (yellow card) 90+9' | Stadium: Zhenjiang Sports and Exhibition Center; Attendance: 23,375; Referee: Tan Hai |

| 23 October 2013 Semi-finals First Leg | Dalian Aerbin | 1 – 2 | Guizhou Moutai | Dalian |
| 19:00 CST | Daniel Mullen 8'; Yu Hanchao (yellow card) 39'; Jin Pengxiang (yellow card) 57' | | Muslimović 18'; Rao Weihui (yellow card) 53'; Misimović 77' | Stadium: Jinzhou Stadium; Attendance: 3,218; Referee: Wang Di |

| 6 November 2013 Semi-finals Second Leg | Guizhou Moutai | 2 – 1 | Dalian Aerbin | Guiyang |
| 16:00 CST | Misimović 7'; Qu Bo 47'; Wu Wei (yellow card) 90+3' | | Yu Dabao (yellow card) 2' (goal) 40'; Chen Tao (yellow card) 74' | Stadium: Guiyang Olympic Centre; Attendance: 20,572; Referee: Ma Ning |
