= Nyasha Mushekwi =

Zimbabwean footballer (born 1987)

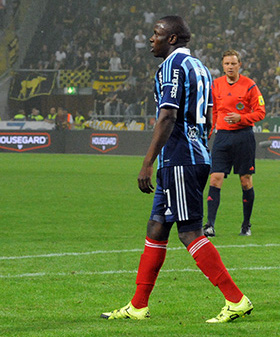
- Mushekwi playing for Djurgårdens IF in 2015.

Personal information
- Full name: Nyasha Liberty Mushekwi
- Date of birth: 21 August 1987 (age 39)
- Place of birth: Harare, Zimbabwe
- Height: 1.88 m (6 ft 2 in)
- Position: Forward

Team information
- Current team: Dalian K'un City
- Number: 30

Senior career*
| Years | Team | Apps | (Gls) |
| 2007–2010 | CAPS United | 68 | (35) |
| 2010–2015 | Mamelodi Sundowns | 80 | (28) |
| 2013–2014 | → Oostende (loan) | 20 | (2) |
| 2015 | → Djurgårdens IF (loan) | 21 | (12) |
| 2016–2019 | Dalian Yifang | 90 | (54) |
| 2019–2023 | Zhejiang FC | 118 | (72) |
| 2024 | Yunnan Yukun | 30 | (25) |
| 2025– | Dalian K'un City | 56 | (31) |

International career
| 2009–2019 | Zimbabwe | 22 | (6) |
- * Club domestic league appearances and goals as of 1 November 2025

Nyasha Liberty Mushekwi (born 21 August 1987) is a Zimbabwean professional footballer who plays as a forward for China League One club, Dalian K'un City.

== Career ==
Born in Harare, Mushekwi started out playing for CAPS United in his homeland Zimbabwe. He won the top scorer award after scoring 21 league goals for the Harare giants in 2009 season.

In 2010, he made the move to South African club Mamelodi Sundowns where he found immediate success when he became the second best goalscorer of the 2010–11 Premier Soccer League season. In April 2013, as his contract was nearing its end, Mamelodi Sundowns extended the deal with another year plus an option for an additional second year.

For the 2013–14 season, Mushekwi was sent on loan to Belgian club K.V. Oostende, but in February 2014 he suffered an injury from which he did not recover until November. Since his South African club had already used all its foreign player slots for the season, he could not be registered to play for them once he had recovered from injury. In an effort to find a new club in 2015, Mushekwi went on trial with Hobro IK in Denmark. However, he signed with Swedish club Djurgårdens IF, which contacted him while he was in Denmark and brought him to Sweden for a trial, resulting in a 6-month loan deal.

=== China ===
On 22 December 2015, Mushekwi transferred to China League One side Dalian Yifang. He was the top goal scorer in the team for 3 consecutive seasons. However, he suffered a few serious injuries later, from which his physical condition was affected.

In the 2017 season, he was once tackled brutally in the right leg, but volunteered to stay on the pitch, and scored an important goal. He eventually helped Yifang win the League One title. In 2018, he was not the preferred player at first competing with Nicolás Gaitán and Yannick Carrasco, but he won a position by continuous goals. He had pelvis injuries during the season. Again he tried to stay in the game after a heavy collision in the head with opponent goalkeeper. Overall, his strong spirit gained high reputation among local fans, and was regarded as one of the most important players in team history.

In the 2019 season, his performance was below expectation after the surgery. On 15 July 2019, Mushekwi joined China League One side Zhejiang Greentown. He would play a vital part as the club gained promotion to the top tier at the end of the 2021 campaign.

On 1 March 2024, Mushekwi joined China League One club Yunnan Yukun.

On 27 December 2024, Mushekwi joined to fellow China League One club, Dalian K'un City from 2025 season.

== International career ==
Mushekwi is a member of the Zimbabwe national football team. He was involved in the Asiagate scandal but avoided a lifetime ban from international football after volunteering information in the investigation.

== Personal life ==
Mushekwi attended Churchill School where his main sport was basketball. He was voted the most valuable player of the Mashonaland Basketball Association League and represented Zimbabwe at under-19 and senior national team level in the sport.

== Career statistics ==
=== Club ===
Appearances and goals by club, season and competition
| Club | Season | League | | | National Cup | | League Cup | | Continental | | Other | | Total | |
| Club | Season | Division | Apps | Goals | Apps | Goals | Apps | Goals | Apps | Goals | Apps | Goals | Apps | Goals |
|---|---|---|---|---|---|---|---|---|---|---|---|---|---|---|
| CAPS United | 2007 | Zimbabwe Premier Soccer League | 16 | 2 | — | | — | | — | | — | | 16 | 2 |
| CAPS United | 2008 | Zimbabwe Premier Soccer League | 18 | 7 | — | | — | | — | | — | | 18 | 7 |
| CAPS United | 2009 | Zimbabwe Premier Soccer League | 21 | 21 | — | | — | | 3 (Note: All appearance(s) in CAF Confederation Cup) | 0 | — | | 24 | 21 |
| CAPS United | 2010 | Zimbabwe Premier Soccer League | 13 | 5 | — | | — | | 4 | 1 | — | | 17 | 6 |
| CAPS United | Total | | 68 | 35 | — | | — | | 7 | 1 | — | | 75 | 36 |
| Mamelodi Sundowns | 2010–11 | South African Premier Division | 27 | 14 | 1 | 0 | 2 | 1 | — | | 1 (Note: All appearance(s) in MTN 8 Cup) | 0 | 29 | 15 |
| Mamelodi Sundowns | 2011–12 | South African Premier Division | 28 | 9 | 4 | 10 | 1 | 0 | — | | 2 | 0 | 35 | 19 |
| Mamelodi Sundowns | 2012–13 | South African Premier Division | 25 | 5 | 3 | 0 | 4 | 0 | — | | 2 | 1 | 34 | 6 |
| Mamelodi Sundowns | Total | | 80 | 28 | 9 | 11 | 5 | 0 | — | | 5 | 1 | 99 | 40 |
| KV Oostende (loan) | 2013–14 | Belgian Pro League | 20 | 2 | 5 | 1 | — | | — | | — | | 25 | 3 |
| Djurgårdens IF (loan) | 2015 | Allsvenskan | 21 | 12 | 0 | 0 | — | | — | | — | | 21 | 12 |
| Dalian Yifang | 2016 | China League One | 30 | 20 | 0 | 0 | — | | — | | — | | 30 | 20 |
| Dalian Yifang | 2017 | China League One | 29 | 16 | 0 | 0 | — | | — | | — | | 29 | 16 |
| Dalian Yifang | 2018 | Chinese Super League | 20 | 15 | 0 | 0 | — | | — | | — | | 20 | 15 |
| Dalian Yifang | 2019 | Chinese Super League | 11 | 3 | 1 | 0 | — | | — | | — | | 12 | 3 |
| Dalian Yifang | Total | | 90 | 54 | 1 | 0 | — | | — | | — | | 91 | 54 |
| Zhejiang Greentown / Zhejiang FC | 2019 | China League One | 13 | 7 | 0 | 0 | — | | — | | — | | 13 | 7 |
| Zhejiang Greentown / Zhejiang FC | 2020 | China League One | 13 | 6 | 0 | 0 | — | | — | | 2 (Note: Appearances in Promotion/Relegation Play-offs) | 1 | 15 | 7 |
| Zhejiang Greentown / Zhejiang FC | 2021 | China League One | 32 | 23 | 0 | 0 | — | | — | | 2 | 0 | 34 | 23 |
| Zhejiang Greentown / Zhejiang FC | 2022 | Chinese Super League | 31 | 18 | 2 | 0 | — | | — | | — | | 33 | 18 |
| Zhejiang Greentown / Zhejiang FC | 2023 | Chinese Super League | 29 | 18 | 0 | 0 | — | | 6 (Note: Appearances in AFC Champions League) | 2 | — | | 35 | 20 |
| Zhejiang Greentown / Zhejiang FC | Total | | 118 | 72 | 2 | 0 | — | | 6 | 2 | 4 | 1 | 130 | 75 |
| Yunnan Yukun | 2024 | China League One | 30 | 25 | 0 | 0 | — | | — | | — | | 30 | 25 |
| Dalian K'un City | 2025 | China League One | 28 | 18 | 0 | 0 | — | | — | | — | | 28 | 18 |
| Dalian K'un City | 2026 | China League One | 28 | 13 | 0 | 0 | — | | — | | — | | 28 | 13 |
| Dalian K'un City | Total | | 56 | 31 | 0 | 0 | — | | — | | — | | 56 | 31 |
| Career total | | | 483 | 259 | 17 | 12 | 5 | 0 | 13 | 3 | 9 | 3 | 527 | 276 |

=== International ===
Appearances and goals by national team and year
| National team | Year | Apps | Goals |
|---|---|---|---|
| Zimbabwe | 2009 | 2 | 2 |
| Zimbabwe | 2010 | 6 | 2 |
| Zimbabwe | 2011 | 3 | 0 |
| Zimbabwe | 2012 | – | |
| Zimbabwe | 2013 | – | |
| Zimbabwe | 2014 | – | |
| Zimbabwe | 2015 | 1 | 0 |
| Zimbabwe | 2016 | 3 | 1 |
| Zimbabwe | 2017 | 4 | 1 |
| Zimbabwe | 2018 | – | |
| Zimbabwe | 2019 | 3 | 0 |
| Total | | 22 | 6 |

Scores and results list Zimbabwe's goal tally first, score column indicates score after each Mushekwi goal.

List of international goals scored by Nyasha Mushekwi
| No. | Date | Venue | Opponent | Score | Result | Competition |
|---|---|---|---|---|---|---|
| 1 | 1 November 2009 | Rufaro Stadium, Harare, Zimbabwe | Zambia | 1–1 | 3–1 | 2009 COSAFA Cup |
| 2 | 1 November 2009 | Rufaro Stadium, Harare, Zimbabwe | Zambia | 2–1 | 3–1 | 2009 COSAFA Cup |
| 3 | 17 November 2010 | Estádio da Machava, Matola, Mozambique | Mozambique | 2–0 | 3–1 | Friendly |
| 4 | 17 November 2010 | Estádio da Machava, Matola, Mozambique | Mozambique | 3–0 | 3–1 | Friendly |
| 5 | 13 November 2016 | National Sports Stadium, Harare, Zimbabwe | Tanzania | 3–0 | 3–0 | Friendly |
| 6 | 15 January 2017 | Stade de Franceville, Franceville, Gabon | Algeria | 2–1 | 2–2 | 2017 Africa Cup of Nations |

== Honours ==
Dalian Yifang

- China League One: 2017

Yunnan Yukun

- China League One: 2024

Individual

- Zimbabwe Premier Soccer League top scorer: 2009
