= Jonathan Ferrari =

Argentine footballer (born 1985)

Personal information
- Full name: Jonathan Marcelo Ferrari
- Date of birth: 8 May 1987 (age 39)
- Place of birth: Buenos Aires, Argentina
- Height: 1.87 m (6 ft 2 in)
- Position: Centre back

Youth career
- All Boys

Senior career*
Years	Team	Apps	(Gls)
2006–2013	All Boys	114	(7)
2011	→ San Lorenzo (loan)	15	(1)
2014	Vitória	4	(2)
2014	Guaratinguetá	–	(–)
2014	Atlético Rafaela	11	(0)
2015	Rosario Central	3	(0)
2016–2017	Patronato	15	(0)
2017	Dalian Yifang	27	(2)
2019	Sportivo Luqueño	5	(0)
2019	CD Olimpia	7	(1)
2020–2021	All Boys	5	(1)
2020	→ LDU Portoviejo (loan)	19	(1)
2021	Olmedo	12	(0)
2022	Manta	8	(0)
2022	Colón FC	5	(1)
2023	Gimnasia de Mendoza	1	(0)
2023–2025	All Boys	55	(1)
2025	Unión San Felipe	15	(0)
- * Club domestic league appearances and goals as of 4 November 2025

Jonathan Marcelo Ferrari (Spanish pronunciation: [ˈɟʝonataɱ feˈraɾi]; (Note: In isolation, Jonathan is pronounced [ˈɟʝonatan].) born 8 May 1985), is an Argentine professional footballer who plays as a defender.

== Career ==
In the first half of 2014, Ferrari played in Brazil for Vitória and Guaratinguetá. In July of the same year, he returned to Argentina with Atlético de Rafaela.

In 2022, Ferrari had a stint with Uruguayan club Colón.

In June 2025, Ferrari moved to Chile and joined Unión San Felipe from All Boys until the end of the season.

== Honours ==
Dalian Yifang

- China League One: 2017
