= Wu Gaojun =

Chinese footballer

Wu Gaojun 吴高俊
Personal information
- Date of birth: 6 March 1985 (age 41)
- Place of birth: Dalian, Liaoning, China
- Height: 1.85 m (6 ft 1 in)
- Positions: Right-back; centre-back

Senior career*
Years	Team	Apps	(Gls)
2005–2018	Liaoning FC	147	(1)
- * Club domestic league appearances and goals as of 3 November 2018

Wu Gaojun (simplified Chinese: 吴高俊; traditional Chinese: 吳高俊; pinyin: Wú Gāojùn; born 6 March 1985) is a Chinese professional football coach and former player.

== Club career ==
Wu Gaojun broke into the senior side of Liaoning FC on 15 May 2005 in a league game against Shenzhen Jianlibao in a 3–1 victory. After making his debut he would become a fringe player within the team until the 2008 league season when he was given his chance to establish himself within the team, however at the end of the season the team could not avoid relegation to the second tier. Despite this he remained with the team to become a vital member within the team's defence and aided the team to an immediate return into the top tier when he saw the club win the division title.

== Club career stats ==
Statistics accurate as of match played 3 November 2018.

Club performance			League		Cup		League Cup		Continental		Total	
Season	Club	League	Apps	Goals	Apps	Goals	Apps	Goals	Apps	Goals	Apps	Goals
China PR			League		FA Cup		CSL Cup		Asia		Total	
2005	Liaoning FC	Chinese Super League	7	0					-		7	0
2006	Liaoning FC	Chinese Super League	1	0			-		-		1	0
2007	Liaoning FC	Chinese Super League	8	0	-		-		-		8	0
2008	Liaoning FC	Chinese Super League	19	1	-		-		-		19	1
2009	Liaoning FC	China League One	24	0	-		-		-		24	0
2010	Liaoning FC	Chinese Super League	13	0	-		-		-		13	0
2011	Liaoning FC	Chinese Super League	5	0	1	0	-		-		6	0
2012	Liaoning FC	Chinese Super League	19	0	3	0	-		-		22	0
2013	Liaoning FC	Chinese Super League	19	0	2	0	-		-		21	0
2014	Liaoning FC	Chinese Super League	18	0	1	0	-		-		19	0
2015	Liaoning FC	Chinese Super League	5	0	0	0	-		-		5	0
2016	Liaoning FC	Chinese Super League	1	0	2	0	-		-		3	0
2017	Liaoning FC	Chinese Super League	1	0	0	0	-		-		1	0
2018	Liaoning FC	China League One	7	0	1	0	-		-		8	0
Total	China PR		147	1	10	0	0	0	0	0	157	1

== Honours ==
Liaoning FC

- China League One: 2009
