= Wu Yuyin =

Chinese footballer

Wu Yuyin 吴禹寅
Personal information
- Date of birth: 8 January 1990 (age 36)
- Place of birth: Liuzhou, Guangxi, China
- Height: 1.88 m (6 ft 2 in)
- Position: Defender

Team information
- Current team: Yinchuan Helanshan
- Number: 7

Youth career
- 2002–2011: Hangzhou Greentown

Senior career*
Years	Team	Apps	(Gls)
2007–2009	Hangzhou Sanchao		
2011–2012	Hangzhou Greentown	2	(0)
2013–2015	Shanghai SIPG	21	(0)
2016–	Dalian Yifang	11	(0)
2017	→ Yinchuan Helanshan (loan)	9	(1)
- * Club domestic league appearances and goals as of 4 November 2017

Wu Yuyin (Chinese: 吴禹寅; pinyin: Wú Yǔyín; born 8 January 1990 in Liuzhou) is a Chinese football player who currently plays for Yinchuan Helanshan in the China League Two.

== Club career ==
Wu joined Zhejiang Greentown youth team system in 2002. He started his professional football career in 2007 when he was sent to China League Two side Hangzhou Sanchao (Zhejiang Greentown Youth). Wu was promoted to Hangzhou Greentown's first team squad in 2011. On 20 October 2012, he made his Super League debut in a 1–1 home draw against Guizhou Renhe.

Wu transferred to Super League newcomer Shanghai Dongya in December 2012. On 7 April 2013, he made his debut for Shanghai Dongya in a 2–0 home victory against Changchun Yatai, coming on as a substitute for Luis Cabezas in the 78th minute. He was degraded to the reserve team squad in the 2015 season.

On 5 January 2016, he transferred to China League One club Dalian Yifang. He was named at Dalian's reserve squad in the 2017 season.

On 23 June 2017, Wu moved to China League Two side Yinchuan Helanshan on a half season loan deal.

== Career statistics ==
Statistics accurate as of match played 4 November 2017.

Club performance			League		Cup		League Cup		Continental		Total	
Season	Club	League	Apps	Goals	Apps	Goals	Apps	Goals	Apps	Goals	Apps	Goals
China PR			League		FA Cup		CSL Cup		Asia		Total	
2007	Hangzhou Sanchao	China League Two			-		-		-			
2008	Hangzhou Sanchao	China League Two			-		-		-			
2009	Hangzhou Sanchao	China League Two			-		-		-			
2011	Hangzhou Greentown	Chinese Super League	0	0	0	0	-		0	0	0	0
2012	Hangzhou Greentown	Chinese Super League	2	0	0	0	-		-		2	0
2013	Shanghai East Asia	Chinese Super League	11	0	2	0	-		-		13	0
2014	Shanghai East Asia	Chinese Super League	10	0	1	0	-		-		11	0
2015	Shanghai East Asia	Chinese Super League	0	0	0	0	-		-		0	0
2016	Dalian Yifang	China League One	11	0	2	0	-		-		13	0
2017	Yinchuan Helanshan	China League Two	9	1	0	0	-		-		9	1
Total	China PR		43	1	5	0	0	0	0	0	48	1
