= Qu Xiaohui =

Chinese footballer

Qu Xiaohui 曲晓辉
Personal information
- Date of birth: March 10, 1987 (age 39)
- Place of birth: Dalian, Liaoning, China
- Height: 1.83 m (6 ft 0 in)
- Position: Midfielder

Senior career*
Years	Team	Apps	(Gls)
2005–2009	Liaoning Whowin	46	(3)
2010	Harbin Yiteng	?	(?)
2011–2012	Changchun Yatai	16	(0)
2013–2014	Liaoning Whowin	0	(0)
2013	→ Lijiang Jiayunhao (loan)	8	(0)
2015	Shenyang Zhongze	0	(0)
2015	Shenyang City		
2016–2017	Dalian Yifang	13	(2)
2018–2019	Dalian Boyoung	59	(21)
2020–2021	Liaoning Shenyang Urban	23	(0)

Managerial career
- 2022-2023: Dalian LFTZ Huayi (player-coach)
- 2024-2025: Dalian K'un City (team manager)
- * Club domestic league appearances and goals as of 31 December 2020

Qu Xiaohui (Chinese: 曲晓辉; born 10 March 1987) is a Chinese former professional footballer who played as a midfielder.

== Club career ==
In 2005, Qu Xiaohui started his professional footballer career with Liaoning Whowin in the Chinese Super League. He would eventually make his league debut for Liaoning on 9 July 2005 in a game against Shandong Luneng Taishan, coming on as a substitute for Zhao Junzhe in the 76th minute.

In 2010, Qu transferred to China League Two side Harbin Yiteng. In March 2011, Qu transferred to Chinese Super League side Changchun Yatai. In January 2013, Qu transferred to Chinese Super League side Liaoning Whowin. In July 2013, he was loaned to China League Two side Lijiang Jiayunhao until 31 December. On 25 January 2016, Qu signed for China League One club Dalian Yifang.

In March 2018, Qu transferred to China League Two club Dalian Boyoung.

== Career statistics ==
Statistics accurate as of match played 31 December 2020.

Club	Season	League			National Cup		League Cup		Continental		Total	
Club	Season	Division	Apps	Goals	Apps	Goals	Apps	Goals	Apps	Goals	Apps	Goals
Liaoning Whowin	2005	Chinese Super League	12	2	0	0	0	0	-		12	2
Liaoning Whowin	2006	Chinese Super League	4	0	0	0	-		-		4	0
Liaoning Whowin	2007	Chinese Super League	8	0	-		-		-		8	0
Liaoning Whowin	2008	Chinese Super League	16	1	-		-		-		16	1
Liaoning Whowin	2009	China League One	6	0	-		-		-		6	0
Liaoning Whowin	Total		46	3	0	0	0	0	0	0	46	3
Harbin Yiteng	2010	China League Two			-		-		-			
Changchun Yatai	2011	Chinese Super League	15	0	1	0	-		-		16	0
Changchun Yatai	2012	Chinese Super League	1	0	1	0	-		-		2	0
Changchun Yatai	Total		16	0	2	0	0	0	0	0	18	0
Liaoning Whowin	2013	Chinese Super League	0	0	0	0	-		-		0	0
Liaoning Whowin	2014	Chinese Super League	0	0	0	0	-		-		0	0
Liaoning Whowin	Total		0	0	0	0	0	0	0	0	0	0
Lijiang Jiayunhao (loan)	2013	China League Two	8	0	0	0	-		-		8	0
Shenyang City	2015	CAL	-		-		-		-		-	
Dalian Yifang	2016	China League One	13	2	2	0	-		-		15	2
Dalian Yifang	2017	China League One	0	0	1	0	-		-		1	0
Dalian Yifang	Total		13	2	3	0	0	0	0	0	16	2
Dalian Boyoung	2018	China League Two	27	5	1	0	-		-		28	5
Dalian Boyoung	2019	China League Two	32	16	1	1	-		-		33	17
Dalian Boyoung	Total		59	21	2	1	0	0	0	0	61	22
Shenyang Urban	2020	China League One	12	0	-		-		-		12	0
Career total			154	26	7	1	0	0	0	0	161	27

== Honours ==
=== Club ===
Liaoning Whowin

- China League One: 2009

Dalian Yifang

- China League One: 2017
