= Dong Yanfeng =

Chinese footballer

Dong Yanfeng 董岩鋒
Personal information
- Date of birth: 11 February 1996 (age 30)
- Place of birth: Dalian, Liaoning, China
- Height: 1.82 m (5 ft 11 1/2 in)
- Position: Defender

Team information
- Current team: Chengdu Rongcheng
- Number: 19

Youth career
- –2015: Dalian Aerbin
- 2013: Liaoning Football Association

Senior career*
Years	Team	Apps	(Gls)
2013	Liaoning Youth	8	(1)
2014–2022	Dalian Professional	84	(3)
2023–	Chengdu Rongcheng	41	(1)
- * Club domestic league appearances and goals as of 31 August 2026

Dong Yanfeng (Chinese: 董岩鋒; pinyin: Dǒng Yánfēng; born 11 February 1996) is a Chinese footballer who currently plays for Chinese Super League side Chengdu Rongcheng.

== Club career ==
Dong Yanfeng would play for the Dalian Aerbin (now known as Dalian Professional) youth team before being selected by the Liaoning Football Association who were allowed to field a team called Liaoning Youth within 2013 China League Two season. Starting his professional football career with them, on 12 May 2013, he scored his first senior goal in a 3–3 home draw with Shenyang Dongjin. When the season ended he would remain with Liaoning as they participated within the football at the 2013 National Games of China, in a tournament that they won.

Dong returned to Dalian in the summer of 2014 and was promoted to the first team, however he failed to establish himself and was returned to the reserve team in 2015. He was promoted to the first team again in the summer of 2016 after the club changed their name as Dalian Yifang. On 31 July 2016, he made his debut in a 1–0 away defeat to Nei Mongol Zhongyou. He scored his first goal for the club on 24 September 2016 in a 2–0 home win over Guizhou Zhicheng. Dong played only one minute in the 2017 league season as Dalian Yifang won the title of China League One and promoted to the first tier. On 29 April 2018, he made his Super League debut in a 1–0 away defeat against Shanghai Greenland Shenhua, coming on as a substitute for Zheng Jianfeng in the 70th minute.

== Career statistics ==
As of match played 31 December 2025.

Appearances and goals by club, season and competition
Club	Season	League			National Cup		Continental		Other		Total	
Club	Season	Division	Apps	Goals	Apps	Goals	Apps	Goals	Apps	Goals	Apps	Goals
Liaoning Youth	2013	China League Two	8	1	–		–		–		8	1
Dalian Yifang / Dalian Professional	2014	Chinese Super League	0	0	0	0	–		–		0	0
Dalian Yifang / Dalian Professional	2016	China League One	6	1	0	0	–		–		6	1
Dalian Yifang / Dalian Professional	2017	China League One	1	0	1	0	–		–		2	0
Dalian Yifang / Dalian Professional	2018	Chinese Super League	12	0	3	0	–		–		15	0
Dalian Yifang / Dalian Professional	2019	Chinese Super League	15	1	2	0	–		–		17	1
Dalian Yifang / Dalian Professional	2020	Chinese Super League	10	0	0	0	–		–		10	0
Dalian Yifang / Dalian Professional	2021	Chinese Super League	19	0	4	0	–		2 (Note: Appearance(s) in Promotion/Relegation Play-offs)	0	25	0
Dalian Yifang / Dalian Professional	2022	Chinese Super League	19	1	0	0	–		–		19	1
Dalian Yifang / Dalian Professional	Total		82	3	10	0	0	0	2	0	94	3
Chengdu Rongcheng	2023	Chinese Super League	15	0	1	0	–		–		16	0
Chengdu Rongcheng	2024	Chinese Super League	9	1	4	0	–		–		13	1
Chengdu Rongcheng	2025	Chinese Super League	10	0	1	0	7 (Note: Appearance(s) in AFC Champions League Elite)	0	–		18	0
Chengdu Rongcheng	2026	Chinese Super League	0	0	0	0	0	0	–		0	0
Chengdu Rongcheng	Total		34	1	6	0	7	0	0	0	47	1
Career total			124	5	16	0	7	0	2	0	149	5

== Honours ==
=== Club ===
Dalian Yifang/ Dalian Professional

- China League One: 2017
