= Cao Xuan (footballer) =

Chinese footballer

Cao Xuan 曹轩
Personal information
- Full name: Cao Xuan
- Date of birth: 2 July 1985 (age 41)
- Place of birth: Dalian, China
- Height: 1.85 m (6 ft 1 in)
- Position: Defender

Youth career
- Dalian Shide
- 2000–2003: Zhejiang Lücheng

Senior career*
Years	Team	Apps	(Gls)
2004–2015	Hangzhou Greentown	221	(7)
2016–2017	Dalian Yifang	23	(2)
2018–2020	Shijiazhuang Ever Bright	42	(1)
- * Club domestic league appearances and goals as of 31 December 2020

Cao Xuan (Chinese: 曹轩; born July 2, 1985) is a Chinese footballer.

== Club career ==
Cao Xuan originally started his football career with the Dalian Shide F.C. youth team. In 2000, he moved to Zhejiang so he could join and play for the Zhejiang Lücheng youth team. With them he graduated to the senior team and started his professional football career at the bottom the Chinese league system. After several seasons with the club he was promoted to the Chinese Super League after seeing Zhejiang Lücheng come second in the second tier. He was a vital member of the team as it established itself as mid-table regulars for several seasons until the 2009 Chinese Super League saw the club struggle within the league. This saw Chinese international Du Wei brought in the following season to strengthen the team's defense and Cao was dropped as a squad regular. When Du Wei left, Cao re-established himself as a vital member of the team's defence.

On 5 January 2016, Cao transferred to his hometown club Dalian Yifang in the China League One. He was excluded from the team squad in the 2017 season under manager Juan Ramón López Caro. Cao joined fellow League One side Shijiazhuang Ever Bright on 26 January 2018. In the following 2019 league season he helped the team win promotion back into the top tier.

== Career statistics ==
Statistics accurate as of match played 31 December 2020.

Appearances and goals by club, season and competition
Club	Season	League			National Cup		Continental		Other		Total	
Club	Season	Division	Apps	Goals	Apps	Goals	Apps	Goals	Apps	Goals	Apps	Goals
Hangzhou Greentown	2004	China League One	10	0	0	0	-		-		10	0
Hangzhou Greentown	2005	China League One	13	0	2	0	-		-		15	0
Hangzhou Greentown	2006	China League One	18	1	6	1	-		-		24	2
Hangzhou Greentown	2007	Chinese Super League	26	0	-		-		-		26	0
Hangzhou Greentown	2008	Chinese Super League	21	0	-		-		-		21	0
Hangzhou Greentown	2009	Chinese Super League	17	0	-		-		-		17	0
Hangzhou Greentown	2010	Chinese Super League	13	0	-		-		-		13	0
Hangzhou Greentown	2011	Chinese Super League	11	0	0	0	2	0	-		13	0
Hangzhou Greentown	2012	Chinese Super League	16	2	2	0	-		-		18	2
Hangzhou Greentown	2013	Chinese Super League	29	4	1	1	-		-		30	5
Hangzhou Greentown	2014	Chinese Super League	21	0	0	0	-		-		21	0
Hangzhou Greentown	2015	Chinese Super League	26	0	0	0	-		-		26	0
Hangzhou Greentown	Total		221	7	11	2	2	0	0	0	234	9
Dalian Yifang	2016	China League One	23	2	0	0	-		-		23	2
Dalian Yifang	2017	China League One	0	0	1	0	-		-		1	0
Dalian Yifang	Total		23	2	1	0	0	0	0	0	24	2
Shijiazhuang Ever Bright	2018	China League One	25	1	0	0	-		-		25	1
Shijiazhuang Ever Bright	2019	China League One	3	0	0	0	-		-		3	0
Shijiazhuang Ever Bright	2020	Chinese Super League	14	0	0	0	-		-		14	0
Shijiazhuang Ever Bright	Total		42	1	0	0	0	0	0	0	42	1
Career total			286	10	12	2	2	0	0	0	300	12

== Honours ==
=== Club ===
Dalian Yifang

- China League One: 2017
