= Li Xudong =

Chinese footballer

Li Xudong 李旭东
Personal information
- Date of birth: 9 February 1991 (age 35)
- Place of birth: Dalian, Liaoning, China
- Height: 1.87 m (6 ft 1 1/2 in)
- Position: Defender

Team information
- Current team: Ganzhou Ruishi (assistant coach)

Senior career*
Years	Team	Apps	(Gls)
2010–2019	Zhejiang Yiteng	132	(6)
2020–2021	Xiamen Egret Island	5	(0)
2022	Dalian LFTZ Huayi		
2022	Dandong Tengyue	0	(0)
2023–2024	Dalian K'un City	10	(0)

Managerial career
- 2025: Dalian K'un City (assistant)
- 2026–: Ganzhou Ruishi (assistant)
- * Club domestic league appearances and goals as of 20 May 2022

Li Xudong (Chinese: 李旭东; born 9 February 1991 in Dalian) is a Chinese football coacn and former football player.

== Club career ==
In 2010, Li Xudong started his professional footballer career with Dalian Yiteng in the China League Two. He would see the club move to Harbin and be an integral member of the squad as they moved up divisions and gained promotion to the Chinese Super League. He would eventually make his top tier league debut for Harbin on 7 March 2014 in a game against Shandong Luneng Taishan that ended in a 1-0 defeat. After only one season within the top flight, Li remained with the club as they moved to Zhejiang.

== Career statistics ==
Statistics accurate as of match played 31 December 2020.

Appearances and goals by club, season and competition
Club	Season	League			National Cup		Continental		Other		Total	
Club	Season	Division	Apps	Goals	Apps	Goals	Apps	Goals	Apps	Goals	Apps	Goals
Dalian Yiteng/ Harbin Yiteng/ Zhejiang Yiteng	2010	China League Two	0	0	-		-		-		0	0
Dalian Yiteng/ Harbin Yiteng/ Zhejiang Yiteng	2011	China League Two	0	0	-		-		-		0	0
Dalian Yiteng/ Harbin Yiteng/ Zhejiang Yiteng	2012	China League One	1	0	0	0	-		-		1	0
Dalian Yiteng/ Harbin Yiteng/ Zhejiang Yiteng	2013	China League One	19	1	2	0	-		-		21	1
Dalian Yiteng/ Harbin Yiteng/ Zhejiang Yiteng	2014	Chinese Super League	18	0	0	0	-		-		18	0
Dalian Yiteng/ Harbin Yiteng/ Zhejiang Yiteng	2015	China League One	25	1	1	0	-		-		26	1
Dalian Yiteng/ Harbin Yiteng/ Zhejiang Yiteng	2016	China League One	27	3	0	0	-		-		27	3
Dalian Yiteng/ Harbin Yiteng/ Zhejiang Yiteng	2017	China League One	6	0	0	0	-		-		6	0
Dalian Yiteng/ Harbin Yiteng/ Zhejiang Yiteng	2018	China League One	12	0	0	0	-		-		12	0
Dalian Yiteng/ Harbin Yiteng/ Zhejiang Yiteng	2019	China League Two	24	1	2	0	-		-		26	1
Dalian Yiteng/ Harbin Yiteng/ Zhejiang Yiteng	Total		132	6	5	0	0	0	0	0	137	6
Xiamen Egret Island	2020	CMCL	-		-		-		-		0	0
Career total			132	6	5	0	0	0	0	0	137	6
