= Li Zhendong =

Chinese footballer

Li Zhendong 李震东
Personal information
- Date of birth: March 14, 1990 (age 36)
- Place of birth: Dalian, Liaoning, China
- Height: 1.83 m (6 ft 0 in)
- Position: Midfielder

Team information
- Current team: Qingdao Zhongchuang Hengtai
- Number: 12

Youth career
- 2006–2008: Beijing Baxy

Senior career*
Years	Team	Apps	(Gls)
2009–2015	Beijing Baxy	86	(3)
2016–2018	Dalian Yifang	22	(1)
2019	Dalian Chanjoy	14	(1)
2020–	Qingdao Zhongchuang Hengtai	7	(0)
- * Club domestic league appearances and goals as of 31 December 2020

Li Zhendong (Chinese: 李震东; pinyin: Lǐ Zhèndōng; born 14 March 1990) is a Chinese football player who currently plays for China League Two side Qingdao Zhongchuang Hengtai.

== Club career ==
Zhu started his professional career with Beijing Baxy in 2009. He was signed by China League One side Dalian Yifang in 2016.

== Career statistics ==
Statistics accurate as of match played 31 December 2020.

Appearances and goals by club, season and competition
Club	Season	League			National Cup		Continental		Other		Total	
Club	Season	Division	Apps	Goals	Apps	Goals	Apps	Goals	Apps	Goals	Apps	Goals
Beijing Baxy	2009	China League Two	1	0	-		-		-		1	0
Beijing Baxy	2010	China League One	22	2	-		-		-		22	2
Beijing Baxy	2011	China League One	20	0	0	0	-		-		20	0
Beijing Baxy	2012	China League One	13	0	0	0	-		-		13	0
Beijing Baxy	2013	China League One	9	1	0	0	-		-		9	1
Beijing Baxy	2014	China League One	10	0	0	0	-		-		10	0
Beijing Baxy	Total		86	3	0	0	0	0	0	0	86	3
Beijing BG	2015	China League One	12	0	3	0	-		-		15	0
Dalian Yifang	2016	China League One	22	1	0	0	-		-		22	1
Dalian Yifang	2017	China League One	0	0	0	0	-		-		0	0
Dalian Yifang	Total		22	1	0	0	0	0	0	0	22	1
Dalian Chanjoy	2019	China League Two	14	1	0	0	-		-		14	1
Qingdao Zhongchuang Hengtai	2020	China League Two	7	0	-		-		-		7	0
Career total			130	5	3	0	0	0	0	0	133	5
