= Han Xuegeng =

Chinese footballer

Han Xuegeng 韩学庚
Personal information
- Date of birth: July 10, 1989 (age 37)
- Place of birth: Dalian, Liaoning, China
- Height: 1.81 m (5 ft 11 1/2 in)
- Position: Defender

Team information
- Current team: Dalian Boyoung
- Number: 29

Youth career
- Liaoning Whowin

Senior career*
Years	Team	Apps	(Gls)
2007–2013	Liaoning Whowin	3	(0)
2013	→ Lijiang Jiayunhao (loan)	8	(0)
2014–2017	Dalian Yifang	16	(0)
2018–	Dalian Boyoung	30	(1)
- * Club domestic league appearances and goals as of 11 October 2019

Han Xuegeng (Chinese: 韩学庚; born 10 July 1989) is a Chinese football player who currently plays for Dalian Boyoung in the China League Two.

== Club career ==
In 2007, Han Xuegeng started his professional footballer career with Liaoning Whowin in the Chinese Super League. He would eventually make his league debut for Liaoning on 28 September 2012 in a game against Tianjin Teda. In February 2013，Han moved to China League Two side Lijiang Jiayunhao on a one-year loan deal.

In February 2014, Han transferred to Chinese Super League side Dalian Aerbin. In March 2018, Han transferred to China League Two club Dalian Boyoung.

== Career statistics ==
Statistics accurate as of match played 11 October 2019.

Club performance			League		Cup		League Cup		Continental		Total	
Season	Club	League	Apps	Goals	Apps	Goals	Apps	Goals	Apps	Goals	Apps	Goals
China PR			League		FA Cup		CSL Cup		Asia		Total	
2007	Liaoning Whowin	Chinese Super League	0	0	-		-		-		0	0
2008	Liaoning Whowin	Chinese Super League	0	0	-		-		-		0	0
2009	Liaoning Whowin	China League One	2	0	-		-		-		2	0
2010	Liaoning Whowin	Chinese Super League	0	0	-		-		-		0	0
2011	Liaoning Whowin	Chinese Super League	0	0	0	0	-		-		0	0
2012	Liaoning Whowin	Chinese Super League	1	0	0	0	-		-		1	0
2013	Lijiang Jiayunhao	China League Two	8	0	0	0	-		-		8	0
2014	Dalian Aerbin	Chinese Super League	5	0	0	0	-		-		5	0
2015	Dalian Aerbin	China League One	7	0	0	0	-		-		7	0
2016	Dalian Aerbin	China League One	4	0	1	0	-		-		5	0
2017	Dalian Aerbin	China League One	0	0	0	0	-		-		0	0
2018	Dalian Boyoung	China League Two	16	1	2	0	-		-		18	1
2019	Dalian Boyoung	China League Two	14	0	1	0	-		-		15	0
Total	China PR		57	1	4	0	0	0	0	0	61	1

== Honours ==
=== Club ===
Liaoning Whowin

- China League One: 2009
