= Cui Ming'an =

Chinese footballer

Cui Ming'an 崔明安
Personal information
- Date of birth: 15 November 1994 (age 31)
- Place of birth: Dalian, Liaoning, China
- Height: 1.80 m (5 ft 11 in)
- Position: Midfielder

Team information
- Current team: Dalian K'un City
- Number: 26

Senior career*
Years	Team	Apps	(Gls)
2013–2023	Dalian Professional	127	(8)
2024	Yunnan Yukun	9	(0)
2025–	Dalian K'un City	0	(0)
- * Club domestic league appearances and goals as of 31 December 2022

Cui Ming'an (Chinese: 崔明安; born 15 November 1994) is a Chinese professional footballer who plays as a left-footed midfielder for China League One club Dalian K'un City.

== Club career ==
Cui started his professional football career in 2013 when he was promoted to Chinese Super League side Dalian Aerbin (now known as Dalian Professional). On 30 April 2014, Cui made his debut for Dalian Aerbin in the 2014 Chinese Super League against Guizhou Renhe, coming on as a substitute for Zhu Xiaogang in the 59th minute. That would be his only league appearance for the club in a disappointing season that saw the club relegated to the second tier. The following season Cui would be given the chance to establish himself as a regular within the team. The club would also change their name to Dalian Yifang F.C. in December 2015. By the end of the 2017 league season he would be a vital member of the squad that won the division championship and promotion back into the top tier.

== Career statistics ==
Statistics accurate as of match played 31 December 2022.

Appearances and goals by club, season and competition
Club	Season	League			National Cup		Continental		Other		Total	
Club	Season	Division	Apps	Goals	Apps	Goals	Apps	Goals	Apps	Goals	Apps	Goals
Dalian Yifang / Dalian Professional	2013	Chinese Super League	0	0	0	0	-		-		0	0
Dalian Yifang / Dalian Professional	2014	Chinese Super League	1	0	1	0	-		-		2	0
Dalian Yifang / Dalian Professional	2015	China League One	20	2	2	0	-		-		22	2
Dalian Yifang / Dalian Professional	2016	China League One	20	2	2	0	-		-		22	2
Dalian Yifang / Dalian Professional	2017	China League One	19	1	0	0	-		-		19	1
Dalian Yifang / Dalian Professional	2018	Chinese Super League	22	3	2	1	-		-		24	4
Dalian Yifang / Dalian Professional	2019	Chinese Super League	5	0	1	0	-		-		6	0
Dalian Yifang / Dalian Professional	2020	Chinese Super League	15	0	1	0	-		-		16	0
Dalian Yifang / Dalian Professional	2021	Chinese Super League	19	0	4	0	-		1 (Note: Appearance(s) in Promotion/Relegation Play-offs)	0	24	0
Dalian Yifang / Dalian Professional	2022	Chinese Super League	6	0	1	0	-		-		7	0
Dalian Yifang / Dalian Professional	Total		127	8	14	1	0	0	1	0	142	9
Career total			127	8	14	1	0	0	1	0	142	9

== Honours ==
=== Club ===
Dalian Yifang/ Dalian Professional

- China League One: 2017
