= Zhao Xuebin =

Chinese footballer

Zhao Xuebin 赵学斌
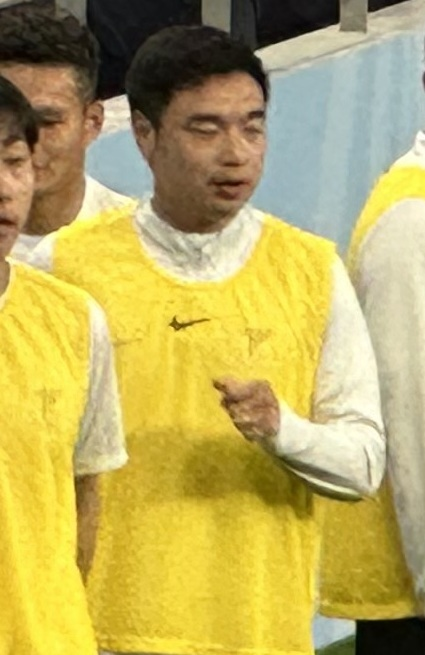
- Zhao Xuebin in April 2025

Personal information
- Full name: Zhao Xuebin 赵学斌
- Date of birth: January 12, 1993 (age 33)
- Place of birth: Dalian, Liaoning, China
- Height: 1.83 m (6 ft 0 in)
- Position: Forward

Youth career
- 2005–2010: Dalian Shide

Senior career*
Years	Team	Apps	(Gls)
2011–2012	Dalian Shide	11	(1)
2013–2021	Dalian Pro	53	(6)
2021–2022	Cangzhou Mighty Lions	3	(0)
2022	→ Xinjiang Tianshan Leopard (loan)	10	(1)
2023–2025	Dalian Yingbo	38	(9)

International career
2015	China U-23	2	(0)
- * Club domestic league appearances and goals as of 26 August 2025

Zhao Xuebin (simplified Chinese: 赵学斌; traditional Chinese: 趙學斌; pinyin: Zhào Xuébīn; born 12 January 1993) is a Chinese professional footballer who plays as a forward.

== Club career ==
Zhao started his professional football career in 2011 when he was promoted to Chinese Super League side Dalian Shide. On 8 May 2011, he made his senior debut for Dalian in a 3–0 away defeat against Liaoning Whowin, coming on as a substitute for Lü Peng in the 69th minute. On 21 May 2011, he scored his first goal in the 89th minute, just three minutes after his substitute on, which ensured Dalian beat Henan Jianye 1–0.

In 2013, Zhao transferred to Dalian Aerbin (now known as Dalian Pro) after Dalian Shide dissolved.

After the 2025 season, Dalian Yingbo annouanced Zhao's departure on 4 March 2026.

== Career statistics ==
Statistics accurate as of match played 1 September 2024.

Appearances and goals by club, season and competition
Club	Season	League			National Cup		Continental		Other		Total	
Club	Season	Division	Apps	Goals	Apps	Goals	Apps	Goals	Apps	Goals	Apps	Goals
Dalian Shide	2011	Chinese Super League	4	1	1	0	-		-		5	1
Dalian Shide	2012	Chinese Super League	7	0	1	0	-		-		8	0
Dalian Shide	Total		11	1	2	0	0	0	0	0	13	1
Dalian Yifang / Dalian Pro	2013	Chinese Super League	2	0	1	0	-		-		3	0
Dalian Yifang / Dalian Pro	2014	Chinese Super League	2	0	1	0	-		-		3	0
Dalian Yifang / Dalian Pro	2015	China League One	14	0	2	2	-		-		16	2
Dalian Yifang / Dalian Pro	2016	China League One	17	3	2	2	-		-		19	5
Dalian Yifang / Dalian Pro	2017	China League One	13	3	0	0	-		-		13	3
Dalian Yifang / Dalian Pro	2018	Chinese Super League	4	0	6	2	-		-		10	2
Dalian Yifang / Dalian Pro	2019	Chinese Super League	1	0	1	2	-		-		2	2
Dalian Yifang / Dalian Pro	Total		53	6	13	8	0	0	0	0	66	14
Cangzhou Mighty Lions	2021	Chinese Super League	3	0	0	0	-		-		3	0
Cangzhou Mighty Lions	2022	Chinese Super League	0	0	0	0	-		-		0	0
Cangzhou Mighty Lions	Total		3	0	0	0	0	0	0	0	3	0
Xinjiang Tianshan Leopard (loan)	2022	China League One	10	1	0	0	-		-		10	1
Dalian Yingbo	2023	China League Two	16	8	1	1	-		-		17	9
Dalian Yingbo	2024	China League One	13	1	1	0	-		-		14	1
Dalian Yingbo	Total		29	9	2	1	0	0	0	0	31	10
Career total			106	17	17	9	0	0	0	0	123	26

== Honours ==
=== Club ===
Dalian Professional

- China League One: 2017
