= Shan Pengfei =

Chinese footballer

Shan Pengfei 单鹏飞
Personal information
- Full name: Shan Pengfei
- Date of birth: 7 May 1993 (age 33)
- Place of birth: Dalian, Liaoning, China
- Height: 1.84 m (6 ft 1/2 in)
- Position: Defender

Team information
- Current team: Shijiazhuang Gongfu
- Number: 29

Youth career
- Dalian Yiteng
- 2012: Dalian Aerbin

Senior career*
Years	Team	Apps	(Gls)
2012–2022	Dalian Professional	104	(0)
2023–2024	Guangxi Pingguo Haliao	53	(2)
2025	Guangdong GZ-Power	7	(0)
2026–	Shijiazhuang Gongfu	0	(0)
- * Club domestic league appearances and goals as of 31 December 2022

Shan Pengfei (Chinese: 单鹏飞; pinyin: Shàn Péngfēi; born 7 May 1993) is a Chinese footballer who plays for Shijiazhuang Gongfu.

== Club career ==
Shan joined Dalian Aerbin youth team system (now known as Dalian Professional) from Dalian Yiteng in January 2012 and was promoted to the first team squad by Aleksandar Stanojević in June 2010. On 27 June 2010, he made his senior debut in the third round of 2012 Chinese FA Cup which Dalian Aerbin beat Beijing Institute of Technology 2–1, coming on as a substitute for Zhou Tong in the stoppage time. The following season, Shan would unfortunately be part of the team that was relegated at the end of the 2014 Chinese Super League campaign. He would remain loyal towards the club and go on establish himself as an integral member of the team that eventually went on to win the division and promotion at the end of the 2017 China League One campaign.

On 16 January 2026, Guangdong GZ-Power announced his departure after the 2025 season.

== Career statistics ==
Statistics accurate as of match played 31 December 2022.

Appearances and goals by club, season and competition
Club	Season	League			National Cup		Continental		Other		Total	
Club	Season	Division	Apps	Goals	Apps	Goals	Apps	Goals	Apps	Goals	Apps	Goals
Dalian Yifang / Dalian Professional	2012	Chinese Super League	0	0	1	0	-		-		1	0
Dalian Yifang / Dalian Professional	2013	Chinese Super League	0	0	0	0	-		-		0	0
Dalian Yifang / Dalian Professional	2014	Chinese Super League	0	0	1	0	-		-		1	0
Dalian Yifang / Dalian Professional	2015	China League One	7	0	1	0	-		-		8	0
Dalian Yifang / Dalian Professional	2016	China League One	11	0	2	0	-		-		13	0
Dalian Yifang / Dalian Professional	2017	China League One	23	0	1	0	-		-		24	0
Dalian Yifang / Dalian Professional	2018	Chinese Super League	20	0	2	0	-		-		22	0
Dalian Yifang / Dalian Professional	2019	Chinese Super League	17	0	3	0	-		-		20	0
Dalian Yifang / Dalian Professional	2020	Chinese Super League	5	0	1	0	-		-		6	0
Dalian Yifang / Dalian Professional	2021	Chinese Super League	12	0	1	0	-		0 (Note: Appearance(s) in Relegation/Promotion Play-offs)	0	13	0
Dalian Yifang / Dalian Professional	2022	Chinese Super League	9	0	0	0	-		-		9	0
Dalian Yifang / Dalian Professional	Total		104	0	13	0	0	0	0	0	117	0
Guangxi Pingguo Haliao	2023	China League One	0	0	1	0	-		-		0	0
Career total			104	0	13	0	0	0	0	0	117	0

== Honours ==
=== Club ===
Dalian Yifang/ Dalian Professional

- China League One: 2017.
