= Sun Bo (footballer) =

Chinese footballer

Sun Bo 孙铂
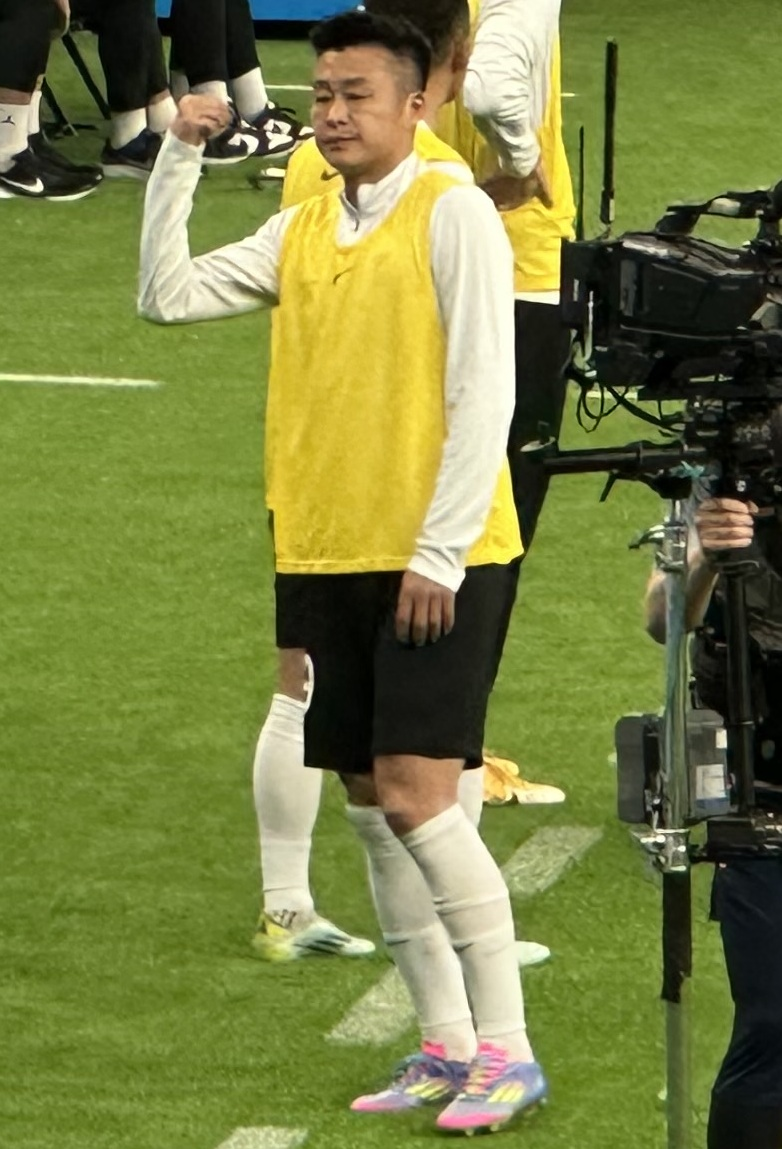
- Sun Bo in April 2025

Personal information
- Date of birth: 22 January 1991 (age 35)
- Place of birth: Dalian, Liaoning, China
- Height: 1.84 m (6 ft 1/2 in)
- Position: Midfielder

Youth career
- –2005: Dalian Shide
- 2006–2010: Shandong Luneng Taishan

Senior career*
Years	Team	Apps	(Gls)
2010	→ Dalian Pro (loan)	15	(3)
2011–2021	Dalian Pro	187	(11)
2022	Heilongjiang Ice City	13	(3)
2023–2025	Dalian Yingbo	53	(4)
- * Club domestic league appearances and goals as of 26 August 2025

Sun Bo (Chinese: 孙铂; pinyin: Sūn Bó; born 22 January 1991 in Dalian, Liaoning) is a Chinese footballer.

== Club career ==
Sun joined the Shandong Luneng Taishan youth team system from Dalian Shide in 2006. He was loaned to China League Two side Dalian Aerbin (now known as Dalian Pro) in 2010. He scored 5 goals in 15 appearances as Dalian Aerbin won promotion to the second tier at the end of the 2010 season. Although Shandong Luneng Taishan decided to call him back, he finally transferred to Dalian Aerbin in 2011. He played 14 league matches in the 2011 season and Dalian Aerbin won two successive championships to promote to Chinese Super League. However, Sun failed to establish himself within the team and made just 6 appearances (56 minutes in total) in 2012 season. Sun had trial at League One side Henan Jianye and Shijiazhuang Yongchang Junhao in January 2013 but stayed at Dalian Aerbin for 2013 Chinese Super League campaign. On 31 July 2013, he scored his first Super League goal 5 minutes after he substituted on in a 2–2 draw against Shanghai Dongya. He scored his second Super League goal 4 days later, which ensured Dalian Aerbin beat Wuhan Zall 3–0. On 7 August, he scored at the last moment of the match in the fifth round of 2013 Chinese FA Cup, helping Dalian Aerbin beat Jiangsu Sainty 2–1 and entered the semi-finals for the first time in club's history.

After the 2025 season, Dalian Yingbo annouanced Sun's departure on 4 March 2026.

== Career statistics ==
Statistics accurate as of match played 31 December 2022.

Appearances and goals by club, season and competition
Club	Season	League			National Cup		Continental		Other		Total	
Club	Season	Division	Apps	Goals	Apps	Goals	Apps	Goals	Apps	Goals	Apps	Goals
Dalian Aerbin (loan)	2010	China League Two	15	3	-		-		-		15	3
Dalian Aerbin/ Dalian Yifang/ Dalian Professional	2011	China League One	14	0	2	1	-		-		16	1
Dalian Aerbin/ Dalian Yifang/ Dalian Professional	2012	Chinese Super League	6	0	2	0	-		-		8	0
Dalian Aerbin/ Dalian Yifang/ Dalian Professional	2013	Chinese Super League	17	2	3	1	-		-		20	3
Dalian Aerbin/ Dalian Yifang/ Dalian Professional	2014	Chinese Super League	27	2	0	0	-		-		27	2
Dalian Aerbin/ Dalian Yifang/ Dalian Professional	2015	China League One	22	0	1	0	-		-		23	0
Dalian Aerbin/ Dalian Yifang/ Dalian Professional	2016	China League One	27	6	0	0	-		-		27	6
Dalian Aerbin/ Dalian Yifang/ Dalian Professional	2017	China League One	21	0	0	0	-		-		21	0
Dalian Aerbin/ Dalian Yifang/ Dalian Professional	2018	Chinese Super League	21	0	5	1	-		-		26	1
Dalian Aerbin/ Dalian Yifang/ Dalian Professional	2019	Chinese Super League	5	1	2	1	-		-		7	2
Dalian Aerbin/ Dalian Yifang/ Dalian Professional	2020	Chinese Super League	16	0	0	0	-		-		16	0
Dalian Aerbin/ Dalian Yifang/ Dalian Professional	2021	Chinese Super League	11	0	0	0	-		0 (Note: Appearance(s) in CSL Relegation play-offs)	0	11	0
Dalian Aerbin/ Dalian Yifang/ Dalian Professional	Total		187	11	15	4	0	0	0	0	202	15
Heilongjiang Ice City	2022	China League One	13	3	0	0	-		-		13	3
Career total			215	17	15	4	0	0	0	0	230	21

== Honours ==
=== Club ===
Dalian Pro

- China League One: 2011, 2017
- China League Two: 2010
