= Zhu Xiaogang =

Chinese footballer

Zhu Xiaogang 朱晓刚
Personal information
- Date of birth: October 6, 1987 (age 39)
- Place of birth: Dalian, Liaoning, China
- Height: 1.80 m (5 ft 11 in)
- Position: Midfielder

Team information
- Current team: Dalian Yingbo B (assistant coach)

Youth career
- Dalian Shide

Senior career*
Years	Team	Apps	(Gls)
2007	Dalian Shide	0	(0)
2008	Chengdu Blades	7	(0)
2010–2021	Dalian Pro	177	(2)

Managerial career
- 2022: Heilongjiang Ice City (assistant)
- 2025–: Dalian Yingbo U-21 (assistant)
- 2026–: Dalian Yingbo B (assistant)
- * Club domestic league appearances and goals as of 31 December 2022

Zhu Xiaogang (Chinese: 朱晓刚; pinyin: Zhū Xiǎogāng; born 6 October 1987) is a Chinese football coach and former footballer.

== Club career ==
Zhu started his professional career with Chinese Super League side Dalian Shide in 2007. However, he failed to establish himself within the first team and could not appear for the club in the 2007 season. In January 2008, after an unsuccessful trial at Wuhan Optics Valley, Zhu transferred to another Super League club Chengdu Blades along with his teammates Ji Mingyi and Zou Peng for a total fee of ¥5 million. Zhu was excluded from Chengdu's first team squad in the 2009 league season.

Zhu was signed by China League Two side Dalian Aerbin (now known as Dalian Pro) in 2010. He became a regular player of the club, helping Dalian Aerbin win two successive championships as the team won promotion into Chinese Super League.

Since the 2019 season, Zhu was put on the bench as the team focused on using young players. He was excluded from the first team squad in the 2020 and 2021 season. On 27 January 2021, he sought for a transfer to top tier club Qingdao F.C. On 19 February 2021, after training with Qingdao the signing was eventually aborted.

On 18 March 2022, he joined fourth tier club Guangxi Yong City as player and assistant coach.

On 18 March 2026, Zhu was named as the assistant coach of Dalian Yingbo B for 2026 China League Two season.

== International career ==
Zhu played for China PR national beach soccer team between 2007 and 2008.

== Career statistics ==
Statistics accurate as of match played 31 December 2022.

Appearances and goals by club, season and competition
Club	Season	League			National Cup		Continental		Other		Total	
Club	Season	Division	Apps	Goals	Apps	Goals	Apps	Goals	Apps	Goals	Apps	Goals
Dalian Shide	2007	Chinese Super League	0	0	-		-		-		0	0
Chengdu Blades	2008	Chinese Super League	7	0	-		-		-		7	0
Dalian Yifang / Dalian Professional	2010	China League Two	17	0	-		-		-		17	0
Dalian Yifang / Dalian Professional	2011	China League One	18	0	1	0	-		-		19	0
Dalian Yifang / Dalian Professional	2012	Chinese Super League	9	0	3	0	-		-		12	0
Dalian Yifang / Dalian Professional	2013	Chinese Super League	11	0	2	0	-		-		13	0
Dalian Yifang / Dalian Professional	2014	Chinese Super League	9	1	0	0	-		-		9	1
Dalian Yifang / Dalian Professional	2015	China League One	23	0	0	0	-		-		23	0
Dalian Yifang / Dalian Professional	2016	China League One	24	0	0	0	-		-		24	0
Dalian Yifang / Dalian Professional	2017	China League One	24	1	1	0	-		-		25	1
Dalian Yifang / Dalian Professional	2018	Chinese Super League	19	0	3	0	-		-		22	0
Dalian Yifang / Dalian Professional	2019	Chinese Super League	23	0	2	0	-		-		25	0
Dalian Yifang / Dalian Professional	Total		177	2	12	0	0	0	0	0	189	2
Guangxi Yong City	2022	Chinese Champions League	-		-		-		-		-	
Career total			184	2	12	0	0	0	0	0	196	2

== Honours ==
=== Club ===
Dalian Yifang/ Dalian Professional

- China League One: 2011, 2017.
- China League Two: 2010
