= 2018 Dalian Yifang F.C. season =

Dalian Yifang F.C.
- Chairman: Shi Fenghe; Zhou Jun (from 3 April)
- Manager: Ma Lin (until 20 March); Bernd Schuster (from 20 March)
- Stadium: Dalian Sports Center
- Super League: 11th
- FA Cup: Semi-finals
- Top goalscorer: League: Nyasha Mushekwi (15); All: Nyasha Mushekwi (15)
- Highest home attendance: 51,666 (11 Nov.)
- Lowest home attendance: 20,197 (22 Apr.)
- Average home league attendance: 33,145
Home colours	Away colours

The 2018 Dalian Yifang F.C. season was the ninth season in club history.

== Overview ==
Dalian Yifang experienced a roller-coaster season, starting with a rather confusing status, then constantly improved their performances throughout the season, but faced difficulties again as multiple players are called up by the National training team, and finally made a great salvation.

=== Confusing preseason ===
Yifang remained low profile after the last successful season, but the team decided not to renew the contract with Juan Caro, despite that Caro himself eagerly wanted to stay. On 26 December 2017, Dalian Yifang officially announced Ma Lin, who shortly sided with the team in 2014, to be the new manager, "under the decision of Dalian Municipal Bureau of Sports", indicating that the ownership of the team was actually in hiatus.

Dalian Yifang moved to Foshan, Guangdong and trained there from 3 January to 12 February, then flew to Jeju Island, South Korea after the Chinese New Year for further training.

Wanda Group, former owner of the disbanded famous local team Dalian Wanda F.C., was widely reported to take over Dalian Yifang, though the decision was not officially announced. The company sought to emphasize back on Chinese market by selling their major overseas assets including shares in Atlético Madrid, after Chinese government put strict regulations and bans on using domestic funding to invest foreign enterprises and investigated a few companies including Wanda, Hainan airlines and Anbang Group.

Yifang released Ferrari and Boli, while the two-time best scorer Nyasha Mushekwi stayed. Yifang signed Mate Maleš from HNK Rijeka before Wanda took control, but later claimed that he was medically unfit as soon as Wanda brought Fonté, Carrasco and Gaitán in, thus terminated the transfer and excluded him from the squad, because the 2018 CSL allowed up to 4 foreign players to be registered in one team only.

=== March ===
Yifang started the season with a catastrophic 0–8 defeat against Shanghai SIPG in the coming back match. The tactics, performance and substitutions were all chaotic. The manager Ma Lin even used six defenders after conceding 5 goals, but still too weak for SIPG's oppressing tactics. Ma Lin himself had already experienced a similar 8–1 defeat in the previous season with Liaoning FC against Shanghai Shenhua.

In the following two matches, Ma Lin used conservative 5-defender formation, putting Carrasco in the central forward position and fed him with long passes, but the results were unsatisfactory, as the team was still totally suppressed by the opponents. Nicolas Gaitán suffered a minor concussion during the match against Beijing Guoan.

The team made contact with Bernd Schuster to replace Ma Lin during the short break of the FIFA Calendar in late March.

=== April ===
On 3 April, Yifang announced that Zhou Jun, who had been working for Shanghai Shenhua since 2006, will be appointed as the chairman after his resignation at Shenhua.

Schuster focused on ball possession and passing. He used more young players than the U-23 policy required, which was seldom seen in other teams.

Yifang won the first match this season against Liaoning FC in the FA Cup. The team claimed that they will focus on the FA Cup, despite the fact that Yifang constantly struggled in the relegation area.

=== May ===
Yifang defeated Chongqing Dangdai by Sun Bo's long drive to enter the FA Cup quarter-finals on 2 May.

On 5 May, Yifang surprisingly overpowered the seven-time league champion Guangzhou Evergrande by 3–0, which was also the first league victory back in the Super League. Nyasha Mushekwi proved himself during this match, scoring 2 goals and gained a penalty as the starting striker. With the limitation of 3 foreign players in the line-up, he replaced José Fonte.

On 20 May, Yifang won the critical relegation match against Guizhou Hengfeng. Since Schuster's arrival, the team remain undefeated at home stadium.

On 27 May, Jia Xiuquan was appointed as the club's youth training chief inspector.

=== Summer Break ===
The 2018 Chinese Super League came to pause longer than usual, from the end of May until July, in consider of the 2018 FIFA World Cup. José Fonte and Yannick Carrasco entered the final squad to play for their respective national teams. Schuster claimed to improve the team during this period, while the club would seek for new players, especially defensive ones, to improve the squad.

Yifang U-19 youth team entered the final round of the U-19 FA Cup, but was defeated 3–4 (0–0) by Jiangsu Suning U-19 in penalty shootout on 28 June.

The team moved to Madrid, Spain for summer training from 8 June until 29 June. Leung Nok Hang, Duvier Riascos and a few young players had trials with the team. Mate Maleš left to join CFR Cluj. Wang Wanpeng signed loan contract to another local team Dalian Transcendence. On 21 June, Yifang signed Duvier Riascos for one and a half years on a free transfer, as well as Qin Sheng on a half-year loan from Shanghai Shenhua, then extended the contract with Nyasha Mushekwi for two years. Upon their return to China, Yifang signed Jin Pengxiang from Beijing Guoan on a half year loan. Fonte would terminate the contract with the club, as Riascos will take his position as foreign player.

=== July ===
Yifang started the second half of the season with 5–0 aggregate victory against China League Two team Sichuan Jiuniu in the FA cup, to enter the semi-finals. Cui Ming'an scored a volley from outside the box in the second leg.

However, the team did not gained victory in the league since their return as multiple players could not attend the match. Wang Yaopeng, Zhu Ting, Li Shuai and Zhou Ting all had muscle issues, while Carrasco did not return until 31 July.

=== August ===
Yifang lost 3 games in a row until the August 1 match against Changchun Yatai. Yang Shanping received a red card as soon as the game started. Li Shuai was called up for China U23 squad to prepare for the 2018 Asian Games, and Yifang gained advantage of using 1 less U23 player than required until 10 August. The losing streak was terminated by a successful 1–0 home revenge to Shanghai SIPG on 5 August. Carrasco scored the only goal after returning from the World Cup. Zhu Xiaogang received a severe 6-match suspension for giving the finger to Shanghai SIPG players after the match. Shortly after, Nyasha Mushekwi scored the first and only hat trick in squad this season, to beat Guangzhou R&F by 3–0, but would miss the next match for accumulating 4 yellow cards. This victory brought Yifang out of the relegation area for the first time this season. Yifang defeated relegation opponent Henan Jianye by 2–1. Although Zhang Chong made a crucial mistake to give Ricardo Vaz Te a gift goal, Mushekwi scored twice to bring the team back to life. Much controversy appeared as Schuster used regular startups in the FA cup match against Shandong Luneng, that the team's performance would be limited by frequent fixtures. Yifang obtained a 1–1 away draw from another relegation opponent, Chongqing Dangdai, on 25 August.

Noticeably, on 12 August, FIFA ordered Iraqi club Al-Shorta SC to pay a final $805,000-worth compensation to Yifang. Al-Shorta signed Nashat Akram in 2014 from Dalian Aerbin, but Akram left Aerbin without permission, and FIFA's decided the transfer had violated the rules. FIFA informed the club previously in March, but the club failed to pay the requested $790 thousand at the time.

=== September ===
Yifang scored 4 goals for the first time this season to claim the 4–3 victory against Shandong Luneng. Jin Qiang scored for the first time since the match against Hunan Billows on 25 July 2015. Zhou Ting broke the record of the oldest player to score in the Chinese Super League by the age of 39 years and 208 days, which he had broken before by the age 36 years and 94 days during the 2015 season for Beijing Guoan against Changchun Yatai on 10 May 2015. Carrasco would play for Belgium in the UEFA Nations League. Mushekwi returned to Zimbabwe, but would miss the 2019 AFCON qualification, because he had had a lot of pain in the pelvis area, and would go for a planned examination in South Africa.

The September 15 match against Tianjin Quanjian would be played one day in advance, in consider that Quanjian's AFC championship home match against J1 League team Kashima Antlers on 18 September was moved to Macau due to multiple concerns. With Li Shuai's first goal in his professional career, Yifang won the first away 3-point from Quanjian.

Yifang continued the winning streak after defeating Shanghai Shenhua by 2–1. Mushekwi scored twice, including a volley near the goal area. He and Carrasco however, were not chosen for the FA cup away match in Shandong on 25 September, as Yifang headed for exit in the FA cup semi-finals by conceding 3 goals, and was unable to break the 2013 record, when Aerbin lost both matches against Guizhou Moutai in the semi-finals. Although Yifang lost the away match in Guangdong, their points had reached a safer position through September.

=== October ===
Chinese Football Association called up a training squad consists of 55 players, from 8 October until 31 December, including Li Shuai, Wang Yaopeng and Wang Jinxian, after released a file previously on 30 September, indicating that Yifang was capable to neglect the U-23 policy from October. These 3 players would miss the rest league matches this season.

Yifang claimed another home victory against Suning. Mushekwi scored twice again, in addition to a free-kick goal from Carrasco, who would miss the next match for accumulating 4 yellow cards.

As for the 20 October lost in Guizhou, Zhang Chong achieved, as the team officially recorded, his 100th appearance under the team name of Dalian Yifang, since Yifang took actual control of Dalian Aerbin F.C. in July 2015. Qin Sheng strained his muscle in the match, bringing further difficulties to the team's defense line.

Yifang lost 2–3 to Hebei CFFC, with Riascos and Cui Ming'an both scored from outside the box. Mushekwi was unable to play as the doctor recommended, and would have a surgery in Madrid to treat the problem that stalked him for the entire season some time later.

On 26 October, a football forum was held in Bangchui Island Hotel, Dalian. Wang Jianlin, potential owner of Yifang, attended the forum, together with the city mayor, a few CFA officials, and owners of other football clubs in Dalian, to discuss about future development of local football. This was strongly believed to be a sign, that Wanda would officially take over the team in the 2019 season, as they did some 24 years ago.

=== November ===
Yifang's November started with another critical loss. Zhu Ting scored his first goal in 2018 season, but Zhang Chong made a Karius-like mistake, by throwing the ball directly to Cao Yongjing, thus ruined the match. Moreover, Yifang lost the following desperate match to Tianjin TEDA. The 4-match losing streak pushed Yifang to the brink of relegation. Mushekwi scored his 50th goal at Yifang, but had a heavy collision later with TEDA goalkeeper Yang Qipeng. He bravely volunteered to resume playing after a short faint, but was eventually substituted off. Later inspection indicated that he suffered potential cervical vertebra injury, to miss the next match.

The last round of 2018 season on 11 November saw a desperate situation, as Yifang, Tianjin TEDA, Changchun Yatai and Chongqing Dangdai were identical 32 points. Any loss or draw would lead to large relegation possibilities, Yifang have to win the game to ensure safety. Yatai striker Odion Ighalo was unable to play due to injuries, while Qin Sheng returned in time. With Riascos's header and Carrasco's killer shot near the goal line, the season-highest 51,666 fans watched Yifang safely ranked 11th as the 2018 Chinese Super League reached its final moments.

== Squad ==
=== First team Squad ===
As of July 2018.

Note: Flags indicate national team as defined under FIFA eligibility rules; some limited exceptions apply. Players may hold more than one non-FIFA nationality.

No.	Pos.	Nation	Player
1	GK	CHN	Zhang Chong
3	DF	CHN	Shan Pengfei
4	DF	CHN	Li Shuai
6	MF	CHN	Zhu Xiaogang
7	DF	CHN	Wang Liang
8	DF	CHN	Zhu Ting
9	MF	ARG	Nicolás Gaitán
10	MF	BEL	Yannick Carrasco
11	MF	CHN	Sun Guowen
12	DF	CHN	Zhou Ting
13	DF	CHN	Wang Yaopeng
14	DF	CHN	Yan Peng
15	MF	CHN	Jin Qiang
16	MF	CHN	Qin Sheng (on loan from Shanghai Shenhua)
17	MF	CHN	Zhang Hui
18	DF	CHN	Wang Xianjun

No.	Pos.	Nation	Player
19	GK	CHN	Yu Ziqian
20	MF	CHN	Wang Jinxian
21	MF	CHN	Liu Yingchen
22	DF	CHN	Dong Yanfeng
23	GK	CHN	Chen Junlin
25	DF	CHN	Jin Pengxiang (on loan from Beijing Guoan)
26	MF	CHN	Cui Ming'an
28	FW	COL	Duvier Riascos
29	MF	CHN	Sun Bo
30	FW	ZIM	Nyasha Mushekwi
31	DF	CHN	Yang Shanping (on loan from Tianjin Quanjian)
33	FW	CHN	Zhao Xuebin
36	MF	CHN	Dong Honglin
37	MF	CHN	Yu Zhen
38	MF	CHN	Yang Fangzhi

=== Reserve squad ===
As of 1 March 2018

Note: Flags indicate national team as defined under FIFA eligibility rules; some limited exceptions apply. Players may hold more than one non-FIFA nationality.

No.	Pos.	Nation	Player
27	DF	CHN	Zheng Jianfeng
41	MF	CHN	Li Yang
42	GK	CHN	Gao Tian
43	GK	CHN	Su Jinyi
44	MF	CHN	Yuan Hao
45	MF	CHN	Liu Zhipeng
46	DF	CHN	Zhu Jiaxuang
47	MF	CHN	Wang Zhilei
48	MF	CHN	Gao Mingxin
49	FW	CHN	Lin Zhiqiang
50	MF	CHN	Zhang Zimin

No.	Pos.	Nation	Player
51	MF	CHN	Yang Lei
52	MF	CHN	Ruan Yingming
53	DF	CHN	Yin Jiahao
54	MF	CHN	Zhu Hui
55	MF	CHN	Zhang Jiansheng
56	DF	CHN	Huang Jiahui
57	MF	CHN	Yang Weihao
58	MF	CHN	Han Peijiang
59	DF	CHN	He Yupeng
60	FW	CHN	Liu Jiqiang

=== Out on loan ===
Note: Flags indicate national team as defined under FIFA eligibility rules; some limited exceptions apply. Players may hold more than one non-FIFA nationality.

No.	Pos.	Nation	Player
2	DF	CHN	Wang Wanpeng (at Dalian Transcendence until 31 December 2018)

== Coaching staff ==
As of August 2018.

Position	Until March 2018	From March 2018	From August 2018	Notes
Head coach	(China) Ma Lin	(Germany) Bernd Schuster	(Germany) Bernd Schuster	
Assistant coach	(China) Li Xicai	(Spain) David Cortés Caballero	(Spain) David Cortés Caballero	
Assistant coach	(China) Li Xicai	(Spain) David Cortés Caballero	(China) Tang Tian	On loan contract from Shanghai Shenhua
Assistant coach	(China) Li Xicai	(Spain) David Cortés Caballero	(China) Liu Peng	
Goalkeeping coach	(China) Han Wenhai	(Portugal) Ricardo Matos	(Portugal) Ricardo Matos	
Fitness coach	(Serbia) Milos Djurovic	(Spain) Carlos Pérez-Cascallana	(Spain) Carlos Pérez-Cascallana	
Tactical coach		(Spain) Daniel Velazquez	(Spain) Daniel Velazquez	
Team official		(Portugal) Henrique Calisto	(Portugal) Henrique Calisto	
Team physician	(South Korea) Kwon Hyuck-Jun	(Spain) Antonio Turmo Garuz	(Spain) Antonio Turmo Garuz	
Team physician	(China) Wang Zhong	(Andorra) Jan Jungwirth	(Andorra) Jan Jungwirth	
Team physician	(China) Li Hengjun	(China) Li Hengjun	(China) Li Hengjun	
Reserve coach	(China) Xu Hui	(China) Xu Hui	(China) Xu Hui	
Youth coach	(China) Pei Yongjiu	(China) Pei Yongjiu	(China) Pei Yongjiu	

== Transfers ==
=== Winter ===
==== In ====
No.	Pos.	Name	Age	Moving from	Type	Transfer fee	Notes	Ref.
—	DF	(China) Wu Yuyin	28	(China) Yinchuan Helanshan	Loan return	—		
17	DF	(China) Zhang Hui	23	(China) Shaanxi Chang'an Athletic	Loan return	—		
38	MF	(China) Yang Fangzhi	22	(China) Dalian Transcendence	Loan return	—		
5	DF	(Portugal) José Fonte	34	(England) West Ham United	Transfer	€5.5M		
10	MF	(Belgium) Yannick Carrasco	24	(Spain) Atlético Madrid	Transfer	€ 30M		
9	MF	(Argentina) Nicolás Gaitán	30	(Spain) Atlético Madrid	Transfer	€ 18M		
27	DF	(China) Zheng Jianfeng	28	(China) Dalian Transcendence	Transfer	Undisclosed		
7	MF	(China) Wang Liang	28	(China) Liaoning F.C.	Transfer	Undisclosed		
31	DF	(China) Yang Shanping	30	(China) Tianjin Quanjian	Loan	—		

==== Out ====
No.	Pos.	Name	Age	Moving to	Type	Transfer fee	Notes	Ref.
3	DF	(China) Cao Xuan	32	(China) Shijiazhuang Ever Bright	Transfer	Free transfer		
5	DF	(Argentina) Jonathan Ferrari	30	—	Released	—		
10	FW	(Ivory Coast) Yannick Boli	30	(United States) Colorado Rapids	Released	Free transfer		
14	MF	(China) Qu Xiaohui	31	(China) Dalian Chanjoy	Transfer	—		
24	MF	(China) Han Xu	29	(China) Meixian Techand	Transfer	—		
28	DF	(China) Du Yuxin	25	(China) Zibo Sunday	Loan	—		
30	DF	(China) Han Xuegeng	28	(China) Dalian Chanjoy	Transfer	—		
42	GK	(China) Li Xinyu	21	(China) Meizhou Hakka	Transfer	—		
43	DF	(China) Li Zhen	21	(China) Liaoning F.C.	Transfer	—		
45	DF	(China) Fu Yuncheng	20	(China) Dalian Chanjoy	Transfer	—		
52	MF	(China) Song Xiaoyu	21	(China) Dalian Chanjoy	Transfer	—		
55	MF	(China) Tang Lianbin	21	(China) Dalian Transcendence	Transfer	—		
58	MF	(China) Wang Junhao	21	(China) Baoding Yingli ETS	Loan	—		
—	GK	(China) Liu Yipeng	21	(China) Dalian Transcendence	Released	—		

=== Summer ===
==== In ====
No.	Pos.	Name	Age	Moving from	Type	Transfer fee	Notes	Ref.
16	MF	(China) Qin Sheng	32	(China) Shanghai Shenhua	Loan	—		
28	FW	(Colombia) Duvier Riascos	30	(Brazil) Vasco da Gama	Transfer	Free Transfer		
25	DF	(China) Jin Pengxiang	28	(China) Beijing Guoan	Loan	—		

==== Out ====
No.	Pos.	Name	Age	Moving to	Type	Transfer fee	Notes	Ref.
2	DF	(China) Wang Wanpeng	36	(China) Dalian Transcendence	Loan	—		
5	DF	(Portugal) José Fonte	34	(France) Lille OSC	Released	Free transfer		

== Kits ==
- Shirt sponsor: Front: 万达城 (Wanda City), Back: 万达广场(Wanda Plaza) (until 18 August)/百年人寿(Aeon Life) (from 18 August)
- Shirt manufacturer: Nike

Home
Away
Goalkeeper
Goalkeeper
Alternate
Goalkeeper
Alternate 2

== Friendlies ==
=== Preseason ===
26 January 2018 Friendly	Dalian Yifang	1–1	Shandong Luneng	Guangzhou, Guangdong
15:00 UTC+8	Nyasha Mushekwi		Graziano Pellè	Stadium: Guangzhou University City Stadium

30 January 2018 Friendly	Dalian Yifang	0–0	Dalian Chanjoy	Foshan, Guangdong
15:00 UTC+8

10 February 2018 Friendly	Dalian Yifang	1–3	Gangwon FC	Foshan, Guangdong
15:00 UTC+8	Sun Guowen

24 February 2018 Friendly	Dalian Yifang	3–1	Cheju Halla University	Jeju City, Jeju Province
13:30 UTC+9	Wang Wanpeng; Nyasha Mushekwi; Dong Yanfeng

=== Summer ===
20 June 2018 Friendly	Dalian Yifang	5–0	UD San Sebastián de los Reyes	Segovia, Spain
18:00 UTC+2	Wang Jinxian; Sun Guowen; Leung Nok Hang; Dong Honglin

24 June 2018 Friendly	Dalian Yifang	2–0	Gimnástica Segoviana CF	Segovia, Spain
18:00 UTC+2	Dong Honglin; Yan Peng			Stadium: Estadio La Albuera

28 June 2018 Friendly	Dalian Yifang	4–0	C.D.E Amistad	Segovia, Spain
18:30 UTC+2	Zhu Ting; Wang Jinxian; Yan Peng

11 July 2018 Friendly	Dalian Yifang	1–0	Zhejiang Greentown	Dalian, Liaoning
17:00 UTC+8	Duvier Riascos 9'			Stadium: Dalian Sports Centre

== Chinese Super League ==
=== League table ===
Pos	Team	Pld	W	D	L	GF	GA	GD	Pts
9	Tianjin Quanjian	30	9	9	12	41	48	−7	36 (Note: Tianjin Quanjian is ahead of Guangzhou R&F on head-to-head points: Tianjin Quanjian 2–1 Guangzhou R&F, Guangzhou R&F 2–6 Tianjin Quanjian.)
10	Guangzhou R&F	30	10	6	14	49	61	−12	36
11	Dalian Yifang	30	10	5	15	37	57	−20	35
12	Henan Jianye	30	10	4	16	30	45	−15	34
13	Chongqing Dangdai Lifan	30	8	8	14	40	46	−6	32 (Note: Chongqing Dangdai Lifan, Tianjin TEDA and Changchun Yatai were ranked by head-to-head points: Chongqing Dangdai Lifan 7 pts, Tianjin Teda 5 pts, Changchun Yatai 4 pts.)

Source: League table
Rules for classification: 1) Points; 2) Head-to-head points; 3) Head-to-head goal difference; 4) Head-to-head goals scored; 5) Reserve league points; 6) U19 Elite league points; 7) Goal difference; 8) Goals scored; 9) Disciplinary points (1 point for each yellow card, 3 points for each red card); 10) Draw

=== Results summary ===
Overall								Home						Away					
Pld	W	D	L	GF	GA	GD	Pts	W	D	L	GF	GA	GD	W	D	L	GF	GA	GD
30	10	5	15	37	57	−20	35	9	3	3	28	18	+10	1	2	12	9	39	−30

Last updated: 11 November 2018.
Source: See Results

=== Position by round ===
Round	1	2	3	4	5	6	7	8	9	10	11	12	13	14	15	16	17	18	19	20	21	22	23	24	25	26	27	28	29	30
Ground	A	A	H	A	H	A	H	A	H	A	H	H	A	H	A	H	H	A	H	A	H	A	H	A	H	A	A	H	A	H
Result	L	L	L	D	D	L	D	L	W	L	W	D	L	L	L	W	W	L	W	D	W	W	W	L	W	L	L	L	L	W
Position	16	16	16	16	16	16	15	15	15	15	15	15	15	15	15	15	14	14	13	13	13	13	10	11	9	9	9	10	15	11

Updated to match(es) played on 11 November 2018. Source: Competitive matches
A = Away; H = Home; W = Win; D = Draw; L = Loss

=== League fixtures and results ===
Fixtures as of 13 February 2018. Might be adjusted if necessary.

3 March 2018 1	Shanghai SIPG	8–0	Dalian Yifang	Shanghai
19:35 (UTC+08:00)	Oscar 1', 24', 75'; Hulk 37' (pen.); Wu Lei 60', 65', 83'; Lü Wenjun 84'	Report	Zhou Ting (yellow card) 89'	Stadium: Shanghai Stadium; Attendance: 21,813; Referee: (China) Guan Xing; Assistant referees: Xu Xianghui, Wu Huifeng; Fourth official: Zhao Zhizhi

10 March 2018 2	Guangzhou R&F	2–0	Dalian Yifang	Guangzhou
19:35 (UTC+08:00)	Huang Zhengyu (yellow card) 26'; Yi Teng (yellow card) 56'; Chen Zhizhao 60'; Zahavi 65'	Report		Stadium: Yuexiushan Stadium; Attendance: 10,116; Referee: (China) Wang Di; Assistant referees: Yi Xueyun, Tang Rongdi; Fourth official: Guo Baolong

16 March 2018 3	Dalian Yifang	0–3	Beijing Guoan	Dalian
19:35 (UTC+08:00)	Carrasco (yellow card) 59'; Jin Qiang (yellow card) 74'	Report	Soriano 12' (pen.), 61'; Wei Shihao 24'; Jiang Tao (yellow card) 44'	Stadium: Dalian Sports Center; Attendance: 41,399; Referee: (Czech Republic) Radek Příhoda; Assistant referees: Zhou Fei, Hu Chengjun; Fourth official: Chen Gang

31 March 2018 4	Henan Jianye	1–1	Dalian Yifang	Zhengzhou
19:35 (UTC+08:00)	Carrasco 11'; Zhu Xiaogang (yellow card) 32'; Zhou Ting (yellow card) 66'	Report	Bassogog 32'; Cala (yellow card) 53'; Gu Cao (yellow card) 70'	Stadium: Hanghai Stadium; Attendance: 20,356; Referee: (China) Wang Jin; Assistant referees: Sun Kai, Liu Jinyu; Fourth official: Zhao Zhizhi

7 April 2018 5	Dalian Yifang	2–2	Chongqing Dangdai	Dalian
15:30 (UTC+08:00)	Zhu Xiaogang (yellow card) 12' (yellow-red card) 60'; Wang Jinxian 18', (yellow card) 23'; Gaitán 56'; Wang Yaopeng (yellow card) 80'	Report	Fernandinho 64'; Luo Hao (yellow card) 80'; Cao Dong 84'; Wang Weicheng (yellow card) 90+3'	Stadium: Dalian Sports Center; Attendance: 23,916; Referee: (China) Lin Jun; Assistant referees: Cao Yi, Huang Tao; Fourth official: Hei Xiaohu

14 April 2018 6	Shandong Luneng	2–0	Dalian Yifang	Jinan
19:35 (UTC+08:00)	Tardelli 32', 79' (pen.); Zheng Zheng (yellow card) 82'	Report	Gaitán (yellow card) 90+4'	Stadium: Jinan Olympic Sports Center Stadium; Attendance: 21,725; Referee: (China) Zhao Zhizhi; Assistant referees: Zhou Fei, Shen Pengxiang; Fourth official: Xia Jun

22 April 2018 7	Dalian Yifang	1–1	Tianjin Quanjian	Dalian
15:30 (UTC+08:00)	Carrasco 45+2' (pen.); Cui Ming'an (yellow card) 77'	Report	Modeste 6' (pen.); Liu Yiming (yellow card) 74'; Sun Ke (yellow card) 84'	Stadium: Dalian Sports Center; Attendance: 20,197; Referee: (China) Fu Ming; Assistant referees: Yu Yue, Yi Xueyun; Fourth official: Tang Shunqi

29 April 2018 8	Shanghai Shenhua	1–0	Dalian Yifang	Shanghai
19:35 (UTC+08:00)	Aidi (yellow card) 20'; Rong Hao (yellow card) 24'; Moreno (yellow card) 25', (goal) 62'; Li Jianbin (yellow card) 66'	Report	Mushekwi (yellow card) 73'	Stadium: Hongkou Football Stadium; Attendance: 20,907; Referee: (China) Zhang Long; Assistant referees: Xu Xianghui, Wu Huifeng; Fourth official: Huang Yejun

5 May 2018 9	Dalian Yifang	3–0	Guangzhou Evergrande	Dalian
15:00 (UTC+08:00)	Mushekwi 24'; Carrasco 43' (pen.); Yu Zhen (yellow card) 81'; Wang Jinxian 87'; Sun Bo (yellow card) 90+5'	Report	Tang Shi (yellow card) 39'	Stadium: Dalian Sports Center; Attendance: 41,096; Referee: (China) Zhao Zhizhi; Assistant referees: Sun Kai, Hu Chengjun; Fourth official: Wang Zhe

13 May 2018 10	Jiangsu Suning	1–0	Dalian Yifang	Nanjing
19:35 (UTC+08:00)	Huang Zichang 58'	Report		Stadium: Nanjing Olympic Sports Centre; Attendance: 30,756; Referee: (China) Huang Yejun; Assistant referees: Zhong Yong, Mei Pan; Fourth official: Liang Caiwei

20 May 2018 11	Dalian Yifang	2–1	Guizhou Hengfeng	Dalian
19:35 (UTC+08:00)	Yang Shanping (yellow card) 53'; Zhu Xiaogang (yellow card) 57'; Mushekwi 74', 89', (yellow card) 90+3'; Carrasco (yellow card) 90+5'	Report	Tang Xin (yellow card) 16'; Yang Ting (red card) 24'; Fan Yunlong 30'; Du Wei (yellow card) 58'; Steve (yellow card) 68'; Suárez (yellow card) 86'; Jelavić (yellow card) 89'; Min Junlin (yellow card) 90+4'	Stadium: Dalian Sports Center; Attendance: 33,959; Referee: (China) Ai Kun; Assistant referees: Shi Xiang, Zhou Fei; Fourth official: Zhao Yi

18 July 2018 12	Dalian Yifang	0–0	Hebei China Fortune	Dalian
19:35 (UTC+08:00)	Shan Pengfei (yellow card) 16'; Qin Sheng (yellow card) 90+3'	Report	Song Wenjie (yellow card) 87'; Hernanes (penalty missed) 90+4'	Stadium: Dalian Sports Center; Attendance: 23,208; Referee: (China) Wang Di; Assistant referees: Zhang Cheng, Bo Deng; Fourth official: Guo Baolong

21 July 2018 13	Beijing Renhe	3–1	Dalian Yifang	Beijing
19:35 (UTC+08:00)	Chen Jie (yellow card) 12'; Moukandjo 47'; Wan Houliang (yellow card) 76'; Masika 85'; Diop 90' (pen.)	Report	Wang Jinxian (red card) 15'; Mushekwi (yellow card) 76'; Riascos 80'	Stadium: Beijing Fengtai Stadium; Attendance: 10,279; Referee: (China) Shi Zhenlu; Assistant referees: Liu Jinyu, Tang Rongdi; Fourth official: Tang Shunqi

28 July 2018 14	Dalian Yifang	2–3	Tianjin TEDA	Dalian
19:35 (UTC+08:00)	Cui Ming'an (yellow card) 21', (goal) 88'; Zhu Xiaogang (yellow card) 64'; Mushekwi 80'	Report	Zhao Yingjie (yellow card) 21'; Cao Yang (yellow card) 56'; Li Yuanyi 61'; Hui Jiakang 65'; Acheampong 70'	Stadium: Dalian Sports Center; Attendance: 25,009; Referee: (China) Zhang Long; Assistant referees: Cao Yi, Yu Yue; Fourth official: Xia Jun

1 August 2018 15	Changchun Yatai	3–0	Dalian Yifang	Changchun
18:00 (UTC+08:00)	Ighalo 10' (pen.), 39' (pen.); Mierzejewski (yellow card) 18', (goal) 29'; Li Guang (yellow card) 21'; Zhou Dadi (yellow card) 27'; Tan Long (yellow card) 36'; Yan Zhiyu (yellow card) 43'	Report	Yang Shanping (red card) 4'; Gaitán (yellow card) 19'	Stadium: Changchun Stadium; Attendance: 13,675; Referee: (China) Guan Xing; Assistant referees: Liu Jinyu, Ma Kexin; Fourth official: Wu Liying

5 August 2018 16	Dalian Yifang	1–0	Shanghai SIPG	Dalian
19:35 (UTC+08:00)	Qin Sheng (yellow card) 13'; Zhu Xiaogang (yellow card) 18'; Carrasco 51'; Gaitán (yellow card) 80'; Riascos (yellow card) 85'	Report	Hulk (yellow card) 45+3'; He Guan (yellow card) 61'; Lü Wenjun (yellow card) 90+6'	Stadium: Dalian Sports Center; Attendance: 26,339; Referee: (China) Ma Li; Assistant referees: Ma Ji, Zhang Hongwei; Fourth official: Hei Xiaohu

10 August 2018 17	Dalian Yifang	3–0	Guangzhou R&F	Dalian
19:35 (UTC+08:00)	Qin Sheng (yellow card) 55'; Mushekwi 35', 56', 82', (yellow card) 84'	Report	Zhang Gong (yellow card) 58'; Lu Lin (yellow card) 70'	Stadium: Dalian Sports Center; Attendance: 27,998; Referee: (China) Wang Di; Assistant referees: Zhang Cheng, Huang Tao; Fourth official: Tang Shunqi

14 August 2018 18	Beijing Guoan	5–2	Dalian Yifang	Beijing
19:35 (UTC+08:00)	Bakambu 17', 75'; Zhang Yu (yellow card) 37'; Viera 40'; Piao Cheng 47'; Augusto 61'	Report	Gaitán (yellow card) 11'; Lei Tenglong 45' (o.g.); Cui Ming'an 68'	Stadium: Workers Stadium; Attendance: 38,126; Referee: (China) Wang Jin; Assistant referees: Zhang Qiangjin, Hu Chengjun; Fourth official: Guo Baolong

18 August 2018 19	Dalian Yifang	2–1	Henan Jianye	Dalian
19:35 (UTC+08:00)	Mushekwi 45+1', 50'; Riascos (yellow card) 56'; Li Shuai (yellow card) 79'; Shan Pengfei (yellow card) 85'	Report	Ma Xingyu (yellow card) 15'; Vaz Tê 34'; Ke Zhao (yellow card) 74'	Stadium: Dalian Sports Center; Attendance: 33,189; Referee: (Czech Republic) Radek Příhoda; Assistant referees: Huo Weiming, Yang yang Fourth official: Niu Minghui

25 August 2018 20	Chongqing Dangdai	1–1	Dalian Yifang	Chongqing
19:35 (UTC+08:00)	Kardec (yellow card) 42'; Ding Jie (yellow card) 49', (goal) 52'; Yuan Mincheng (yellow card) 66'; Peng Xinli (yellow card) 76'	Report	Mushekwi 24'; Zhou Ting (yellow card) 57'	Stadium: Chongqing Olympic Sports Center; Attendance: 34,685; Referee: (China) Wang Di; Assistant referees: Zhou Fei, Wu Huifeng; Fourth official: Liang Caiwei

1 September 2018 21	Dalian Yifang	4–3	Shandong Luneng	Dalian
19:35(UTC+08:00)	Gaitán 33', (yellow card) 87'; Zhou Ting 36'; Carrasco 62' (pen.); Li Shuai (yellow card) 72'; Jin Qiang 86'	Report	Yao Junsheng (yellow card) 36'; Diego Tardelli (yellow card) 50'; Jin Jingdao (yellow card) 50'; Wu Xinghan 57'; Gil (yellow card) 60'; Zhang Chi 70', (yellow card) 87'; Graziano Pellé 78'; Liu Junshuai (yellow card) 87'	Stadium: Dalian Sports Center; Attendance: 33,698; Referee: (China) Wang Jin; Assistant referees: Ma Ji, Xi Fei; Fourth official: Hei Xiaohu

14 September 2018 22	Tianjin Quanjian	0–1	Dalian Yifang	Tianjin
17:30 (UTC+08:00)	Wang Xiaolong (yellow card) 38'; Kwon Kyung-Won (yellow card) 58'	Report	Carrasco (yellow card) 58'; Li Shuai 73'	Stadium: Haihe Educational Football Stadium; Attendance: 15,006; Referee: (China) Huang Yejun; Assistant referees: Zhang Jian, Shen Pengxiang; Fourth official: Wang Zhe

22 September 2018 23	Dalian Yifang	2–1	Shanghai Shenhua	Dalian
15:30(UTC+08:00)	Mushekwi 12', 85'; Gaitán (yellow card) 45+1'; Jin Qiang (yellow card) 76'	Report	Liu Ruofan 61'	Stadium: Dalian Sports Center; Attendance: 41,889; Referee: (China) Gu Chunhan; Assistant referees: Xu Xianghui, Wu Huifeng; Fourth official: Ma Li

29 September 2018 24	Guangzhou Evergrande	3–0	Dalian Yifang	Guangzhou
19:35 (UTC+08:00)	Alan 6' (pen.); Gao Lin 65'; Mushekwi 69' (o.g.)	Report		Stadium: Tianhe Stadium; Attendance: 46,392; Referee: (China) Shi Zhenlu; Assistant referees: Cao Yi, Liu Jinyu; Fourth official: Ma Li

6 October 2018 25	Dalian Yifang	3–1	Jiangsu Suning	Dalian
15:30 (UTC+08:00)	Zhu Ting (yellow card) 9'; Mushekwi 37', 84'; Li Shuai (yellow card) 55'; Carrasco (yellow card) 17' (goal) 68'	Report	Gabriel Paletta 4' (yellow card) 67'; Abduhamit (yellow card) 41'	Stadium: Dalian Sports Center; Attendance: 43,579; Referee: (China) Wang Zhe; Assistant referees: Yu Xue, Xi Fei; Fourth official: Guo Baolong

20 October 2018 26	Guizhou Hengfeng	3–0	Dalian Yifang	Guiyang
19:35 (UTC+08:00)	Nikica Jelavić (yellow card) 14'; Lin Longchang 42'; Liu Hao 55'; Kévin Boli 79'	Report		Stadium: Guiyang Olympic Sports Center; Attendance: 12,583; Referee: (China) Huang Yejun; Assistant referees: Zhang Qiangjin, Deng Bo; Fourth official: Zhao Zhizhi

27 October 2018 27	Hebei China Fortune	3–2	Dalian Yifang	Langfang
19:35 (UTC+08:00)	Du Wenyang (yellow card) 45+2'; Zhang Chong 74' (o.g.); Dong Xuesheng 77', 81'	Report	Riascos 4'; Dong Yanfeng (yellow card) 74'; Cui Ming'an 84'; Carrasco (yellow card) 90+4'	Stadium: Langfang Stadium; Attendance: 16,503; Referee: (China) Shi Zhenlu; Assistant referees: Cao Yi, Tang Rongdi; Fourth official: Wu Liying

3 November 2018 28	Dalian Yifang	1–2	Beijing Renhe	Dalian
15:30 (UTC+08:00)	Zhu Ting 12'; Zhang Chong (yellow card) 19'; Cui Ming'an (yellow card) 31'; Jin Qiang (yellow card) 58'; Dong Yanfeng (yellow card) 79'; Zhou Ting (yellow card) 90+4'	Report	Makhete Diop 18', 81'; Cao Yongjing (yellow card) 23'; Luo Xin (yellow card) 43'; Yu Bin (yellow card) 90+4'	Stadium: Dalian Sports Center; Attendance: 30,029; Referee: (China) Guo Baolong; Assistant referees: Yu Yue, Guo Jingtao; Fourth official: Tang Shunqi

7 November 2018 29	Tianjin TEDA	3–1	Dalian Yifang	Tianjin
19:35 (UTC+08:00)	Tan Wangsong (yellow card) 35'; Peng Rui (yellow card) 45+1'; Xie Weijun 57'; Zhao Yingjie 74'; Yang Qipeng (yellow card) 90'; Frank Acheampong 90+1'	Report	Sun Bo (yellow card) 39'; Mushekwi 47' (yellow card) 69'; Zhang Chong (yellow card) 54'; Carrasco (yellow card) 90+4'	Stadium: Tianjin Olympic Center Stadium; Attendance: 31,607; Referee: (Germany) Bastian Dankert; Assistant referees: (Germany) René Rohde, (China) Zou Fei; Fourth official: (China) Niu Minghui

11 November 2018 30	Dalian Yifang	2–0	Changchun Yatai	Dalian
15:30 (UTC+08:00)	Riascos 23'; Qin Sheng (yellow card) 25'; Carrasco 64' (yellow card) 90+2'; Zhou Ting (yellow card) 76'	Report	Sun Jie (yellow card) 22'; Li Guang (yellow card) 71'	Stadium: Dalian Sports Center; Attendance: 51,666; Referee: (Bahrain) Nawaf Shukralla; Assistant referees: (Bahrain) Mohamed Jaafar Mohamed Salman, Yaser Tulefat; Fourth official: (China) Hei Xiaohu

== Chinese FA Cup ==
=== FA Cup fixtures and results ===
As of 24 July 2018.

24 April 2018 4	Liaoning F.C.	1–4	Dalian Yifang	Shenyang, Liaoning
15:30 (UTC+08:00)	Yang Shuai 42'; Ni Yusong (yellow card) 58'; Sang Yifei (yellow card) 85'	Report	Sun Guowen 13'; Liu Yingchen 29'; Zhao Xuebin 32' (pen.); Jin Qiang (yellow card) 44'; Zhou Ting (yellow card) 58'; Zhang Hui 81' (yellow card) 81'	Stadium: Tiexi Stadium; Attendance: 1,527; Referee: (China) Yang Kaizi; Assistant referees: Zhang Meilin, Zhang Kun; Fourth official: Bai Bin

2 May 2018 5	Chongqing Lifan	0–1	Dalian Yifang	Chongqing
19:35 (UTC+08:00)		Report	Sun Bo 90+2'	Stadium: Chongqing Olympic Sports Center; Attendance: 10,856; Referee: (China) Wang Di; Assistant referees: Zhou Fei, Deng Bo; Fourth official: Xia Jun

==== Quarter-finals ====
7 July 2018 1st Leg	Dalian Yifang	3–0	Sichuan Jiuniu	Dalian, Liaoning
19:35 (UTC+08:00)	Zhu Ting (yellow card) 32' (goal) 45'; Wang Jiong 52' (o.g.); Zhao Xuebin 81'; Wang Jinxian (yellow card) 84'	Report	Zhao Heng (yellow card) 34'	Stadium: Dalian Sports Center; Attendance: 10,208; Referee: (China) Ai Kun; Assistant referees: Huo Weiming, Sun Kai; Fourth official: Guan Xing

24 July 2018 2nd Leg	Sichuan Jiuniu	0–2 (0–5 agg.)	Dalian Yifang	Chengdu, Sichuan
19:35 (UTC+08:00)		Report	Qin Sheng 42' (pen.); Cui Ming'an 54'; Zhao Xuebin (yellow card) 87'	Stadium: Chengdu Longquanyi Football Stadium; Attendance: 9,116; Referee: (China) Fu Ming; Assistant referees: Zhang Cheng, Zhou Fei; Fourth official: Liang Caiwei

==== Semi-finals ====
21 August 2018 1st Leg	Dalian Yifang	0–1	Shandong Luneng	Dalian, Liaoning
19:35 (UTC+08:00)		Report	Jin Jingdao 14'	Stadium: Dalian Sports Center; Attendance: 13,829; Referee: (China) Gu Chunhan; Assistant referees: Cao Yi, Zhang Cheng; Fourth official: Zhang Long

25 September 2018 2nd Leg	Shandong Luneng	3–0 (4–0 agg.)	Dalian Yifang	Jinan, Shandong
18:00 (UTC+08:00)	Liu Yang 48'; Jin Jingdao (yellow card) 52'; Diego Tardelli 85' (pen.)		Li Shuai (yellow card) 86'	Stadium: Jinan Olympic Sports Center Stadium; Attendance: 15,369; Referee: (Serbia) Milorad Mažić; Assistant referees: (Serbia) Milovan Ristić, Dalibor Đurđević; Fourth official: (China) Li Haixin

== Squad statistics ==
=== Appearances and goals ===
As of November 2018. Source

No.	Pos.	Player	Nat.	Age	Super League			FA Cup			Total		
No.	Pos.	Player	Nat.	Age	App.	Starts	Goals	App.	Starts	Goals	App.	Starts	Goals
1	GK	Zhang Chong	(China)	31	30	30	0	1	1	0	31	31	0
2	DF	Wang Wanpeng	(China)	36	3	3	0	2	2	0	5	5	0
3	DF	Shan Pengfei	(China)	25	20	14	0	2	2	0	22	16	0
4	DF	Li Shuai	(China)	23	18	16	1	3	3	0	21	19	1
5	DF	José Fonte	(Portugal)	34	7	7	0	2	2	0	9	9	0
6	MF	Zhu Xiaogang	(China)	31	19	19	0	3	1	0	22	20	0
7	MF	Wang Liang	(China)	29	3	3	0	2	1	0	5	4	0
8	MF	Zhu Ting	(China)	33	26	23	1	3	3	1	29	26	2
9	MF	Nicolás Gaitán	(Argentina)	30	28	28	2	2	2	0	30	30	2
10	MF	Yannick Carrasco	(Belgium)	24	25	25	7	1	1	0	26	26	7
11	MF	Sun Guowen	(China)	25	7	1	0	4	3	1	11	4	1
12	DF	Zhou Ting	(China)	39	20	15	1	5	5	0	25	20	1
13	DF	Wang Yaopeng	(China)	23	22	16	0	3	3	0	25	19	0
14	DF	Yan Peng	(China)	23	7	0	0	4	1	0	11	1	0
15	MF	Jin Qiang	(China)	25	17	11	1	3	3	0	20	14	1
16	MF	Qin Sheng	(China)	32	13	11	0	4	4	1	17	15	1
17	MF	Zhang Hui	(China)	22	0	0	0	2	1	1	2	1	1
18	MF	Wang Xianjun	(China)	18	0	0	0	0	0	0	0	0	0
19	GK	Yu Ziqian	(China)	33	0	0	0	5	5	0	5	5	0
20	MF	Wang Jinxian	(China)	22	20	18	2	2	2	0	22	20	2
21	MF	Liu Yingchen	(China)	25	0	0	0	4	2	1	4	2	1
22	DF	Dong Yanfeng	(China)	22	12	6	0	3	2	0	15	8	0
23	GK	Chen Junlin	(China)	25	0	0	0	0	0	0	0	0	0
25	DF	Jin Pengxiang	(China)	28	1	0	0	1	1	0	2	1	0
26	MF	Cui Ming'an	(China)	24	22	19	3	2	1	1	24	20	4
27	DF	Zheng Jianfeng	(China)	29	3	3	0	0	0	0	3	3	0
28	FW	Duvier Riascos	(Colombia)	30	9	7	3	2	2	0	11	9	3
29	MF	Sun Bo	(China)	27	21	7	0	5	5	1	26	12	1
30	FW	Nyasha Mushekwi	(Zimbabwe)	31	20	20	15	0	0	0	20	20	15
31	DF	Yang Shanping	(China)	31	25	24	0	2	2	0	27	26	0
33	FW	Zhao Xuebin	(China)	25	4	0	0	6	3	2	10	3	2
36	DF	Dong Honglin	(China)	22	0	0	0	3	3	1	3	3	1
37	DF	Yu Zhen	(China)	21	3	1	0	1	0	0	4	1	0
38	MF	Yang Fangzhi	(China)	21	4	3	0	1	0	0	5	3	0
TOTALS							36			10			36

=== Goalscorers ===
Rank	Player	Super League	FA Cup	Total
1	Nyasha Mushekwi	15	0	15
2	Yannick Carrasco	7	0	7
3	Cui Ming'an	3	1	4
4	Duvier Riascos	3	0	3
5	Nicolás Gaitán	2	0	2
5	Wang Jinxian	2	0	2
5	Zhao Xuebin	0	2	2
5	Zhu Ting	1	1	2
9	Li Shuai	1	0	1
9	Jin Qiang	1	0	1
9	Zhou Ting	1	0	1
9	Wang Yaopeng	1	0	1
9	Dong Honglin	0	1	1
9	Liu Yingchen	0	1	1
9	Qin Sheng	0	1	1
9	Sun Bo	0	1	1
9	Sun Guowen	0	1	1
9	Zhang Hui	0	1	1
TOTALS		36	10	36

=== Disciplinary record ===
No.	Pos.	Player	Super League			FA Cup			Total		
No.	Pos.	Player	Yellow card	(yellow card) (yellow-red card)	Red card	Yellow card	(yellow card) (yellow-red card)	Red card	Yellow card	(yellow card) (yellow-red card)	Red card
1	GK	Zhang Chong	2	0	0	0	0	0	2	0	0
2	DF	Wang Wanpeng	0	0	0	0	0	0	0	0	0
3	DF	Shan Pengfei	2	0	0	0	0	0	2	0	0
4	DF	Li Shuai	3	0	0	1	0	0	4	0	0
5	DF	José Fonte	0	0	0	0	0	0	0	0	0
6	MF	Zhu Xiaogang	5	1	0	0	0	0	5	1	0
7	MF	Wang Liang	0	0	0	0	0	0	0	0	0
8	MF	Zhu Ting	1	0	0	1	0	0	2	0	0
9	MF	Nicolás Gaitán	6	0	0	0	0	0	6	0	0
10	MF	Yannick Carrasco	7	0	0	0	0	0	7	0	0
11	MF	Sun Guowen	0	0	0	0	0	0	0	0	0
12	DF	Zhou Ting	5	0	0	1	0	0	6	0	0
13	DF	Wang Yaopeng	1	0	0	0	0	0	1	0	0
14	DF	Yan Peng	0	0	0	0	0	0	0	0	0
15	MF	Jin Qiang	3	0	0	1	0	0	4	0	0
16	MF	Qin Sheng	4	0	0	0	0	0	4	0	0
17	MF	Zhang Hui	0	0	0	1	0	0	1	0	0
18	MF	Wang Xianjun	0	0	0	0	0	0	0	0	0
19	GK	Yu Ziqian	0	0	0	0	0	0	0	0	0
20	MF	Wang Jinxian	1	0	1	1	0	0	2	0	1
21	MF	Liu Yingchen	0	0	0	0	0	0	0	0	0
22	DF	Dong Yanfeng	2	0	0	0	0	0	2	0	0
23	GK	Chen Junlin	0	0	0	0	0	0	0	0	0
25	DF	Jin Pengxiang	0	0	0	0	0	0	0	0	0
26	MF	Cui Ming'an	3	0	0	0	0	0	3	0	0
27	DF	Zheng Jianfeng	0	0	0	0	0	0	0	0	0
28	FW	Duvier Riascos	2	0	0	0	0	0	2	0	0
29	MF	Sun Bo	2	0	0	0	0	0	2	0	0
30	FW	Nyasha Mushekwi	5	0	0	0	0	0	5	0	0
31	DF	Yang Shanping	1	0	1	0	0	0	1	0	1
33	FW	Zhao Xuebin	0	0	0	1	0	0	1	0	0
36	DF	Dong Honglin	0	0	0	0	0	0	0	0	0
37	DF	Yu Zhen	1	0	0	0	0	0	1	0	0
38	MF	Yang Fangzhi	0	0	0	0	0	0	0	0	0
TOTALS			56	1	2	7	0	0	63	1	2

=== Suspensions ===
Player	No. of matches served	Reason	Date(s) served	Opponent	Ref.
Zhu Xiaogang	1	Red card vs. Chongqing Dangdai	14 Apr.	Shandong Luneng	
Wang Jinxian	1	Red card vs. Beijing Renhe	28 Jul.	Tianjin TEDA	
Yang Shanping	1	Red card vs. Changchun Yatai	5 Aug.	Shanghai SIPG	
Zhu Xiaogang	6	Inappropriate gesture (giving the finger) to opponent players after match	10 Aug.-14 Sep.	—	
Qin Sheng	1	Four yellow cards accumulated	14 Aug.	Beijing Guoan	
Nyasha Mushekwi	1	Four yellow cards accumulated	14 Aug.	Beijing Guoan	
Nico Gaitán	1	Four yellow cards accumulated	18 Aug.	Henan Jianye	
Yannick Carrasco	1	Four yellow cards accumulated	20 Oct.	Guizhou Hengfeng	
Zhou Ting	1	Four yellow cards accumulated	7 Nov.	Tianjin TEDA	
