= Ricardo Matos =

Ricardo Matos may refer to:

- Ricardo Matos (footballer, born 1979), Portuguese footballer, goalkeeper
- Ricardo Matos (footballer, born 2000), Portuguese footballer, forward
