= Nicolás Gaitán =

Argentine footballer (born 1988)

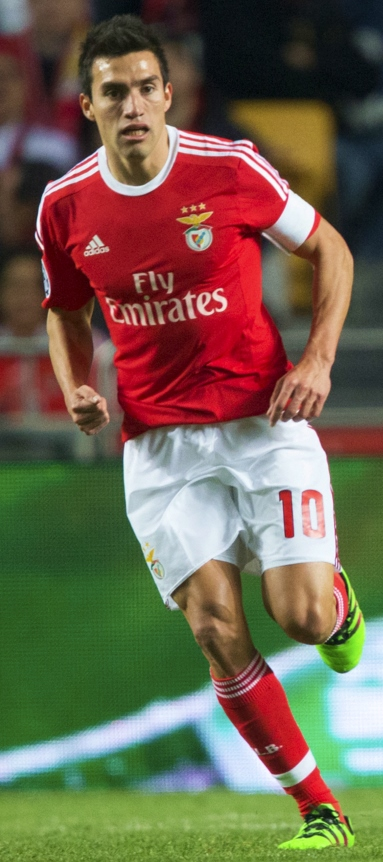
- Gaitán playing for Benfica in 2016

Personal information
- Full name: Osvaldo Nicolás Fabián Gaitán
- Date of birth: 23 February 1988 (age 38)
- Place of birth: San Martín, Argentina
- Height: 1.74 m (5 ft 9 in)
- Positions: Attacking midfielder; winger

Team information
- Current team: Aldosivi
- Number: 10

Youth career
- 2001–2008: Boca Juniors

Senior career*
Years	Team	Apps	(Gls)
2008–2010	Boca Juniors	66	(12)
2010–2016	Benfica	152	(25)
2016–2018	Atlético Madrid	29	(3)
2018–2019	Dalian Yifang	28	(2)
2019	Chicago Fire	27	(4)
2020	Lille	4	(0)
2020–2021	Braga	18	(2)
2021–2022	Peñarol	10	(1)
2022–2023	Paços de Ferreira	33	(5)
2024	Sarmiento	16	(1)
2026–	Aldosivi	13	(1)

International career^{‡}
2009–2016	Argentina	19	(2)
- * Club domestic league appearances and goals as of 17:43, 6 November 2026 (UTC) ‡ National team caps and goals as of 18 October 2016

Osvaldo Nicolás Fabián "Nico" Gaitán (Spanish pronunciation: [osˈβaldo faˈβjan nikoˈlas ˈniko ɣajˈtan]; (Note: In isolation, Gaitán is pronounced [ɡajˈtan].) born 23 February 1988) is an Argentine professional footballer who plays as an attacking midfielder or winger for Aldosivi.

A product of Boca Juniors, he joined Benfica in Portugal, where he won three Primeira Liga titles, one Taça de Portugal, five Taça da Liga and one Supertaça Cândido de Oliveira in six seasons.

== Club career ==
=== Boca Juniors ===
Born in San Martín, Buenos Aires, Gaitán rose from the ranks at Boca Juniors, having entered its youth system at the age of 13 in spite of doubts regarding his future due to his small frame. He made his competitive debut with the club on 1 June 2008 in a 3–1 win against Arsenal de Sarandí, and scored his first two Primera División goals two months later in a 3–0 success at Huracán.

On 23 September 2008 Gaitán netted his first goal in an international tournament, that year's Copa Sudamericana, against Liga de Quito. Two days later he again made the scoresheet, in the 4–2 win over Newell's Old Boys where he also set up Lucas Viatri for his side's final goal.

Gaitán scored seven times in 33 games in his last season with Boca, who only managed to finish 11th in the Apertura and 16th in the Clausura.

=== Benfica ===
On 3 May 2010, Portugal's Benfica confirmed they had reached an agreement to sign Gaitán for €8.4 million, as a replacement for countryman Ángel Di María who had just been sold to Real Madrid. He made his official debut for his new team by starting and playing 66 minutes in a 1–2 away loss to Nacional, opening his scoring account also with a brace, at home against Naval on 14 November (4–0).

Gaitán finished his first year with the Lisbon side with 48 appearances all competitions comprised, scoring nine times as it finished second in the league and won the domestic league cup. For his performances, he was named Portuguese League Breakthrough Player of the Year.

In the 2011–12 campaign Gaitán led the UEFA Champions League assists table, until the knockout stage. In 2013–14 he contributed with eight goals overall as his team conquered the treble, including the game's only goal in the Portuguese Cup's decisive match against Rio Ave on 18 May 2014; His performances were praised throughout the season. On 31 August 2014, Gaitán scored his first goal of the season against Sporting CP, while also being named 'Man of the Match'.

On 11 November 2014, he extended his contract with Benfica until 30 June 2018 and set a release clause of €35 million. On 30 September 2015, Gaitán scored a goal and later assisted the second goal in a win at Atlético Madrid (1–2) in the UEFA Champions League. On 9 December 2015, he signed an improved contract through June 2019, increasing his release clause to €45 million. On 9 March, Gaitán scored his fourth goal of the season in the Champions League, against Zenit Saint Petersburg in the second leg of the round of 16, helping Benfica to reach the quarter-finals of the competition with a 3–1 aggregate score, after a 2–1 win in Russia. On 15 May, he scored twice in a 4–1 home win against Nacional, helping Benfica to secure the league title for the third consecutive season. Five days later, he scored Benfica's fourth goal in a 6–2 win over Marítimo in the Taça da Liga final. A minute later, he was substituted and received a standing ovation while leaving the pitch in tears. After the final whistle, he said it was probably his last match with Benfica.

=== Atlético Madrid ===
On 16 June 2016, Benfica and Atlético Madrid agreed on the transfer of Gaitán for €25 million, with the contract to be signed after medical exams in July. His official presentation for the Spanish side was held on 19 July at the Vicente Calderón stadium.

=== Dalian Yifang ===
On 26 February 2018, along with teammate Yannick Carrasco, Gaitán joined Chinese Super League newcomers Dalian Yifang, which was also owned by Atlético Madrid's partial owner Wanda Group. On 3 March, he made his Chinese league debut in an 8–0 away loss to Shanghai SIPG. He temporarily lost consciousness and was taken to hospital following an elbowing from Li Lei during a league match against Beijing Guoan on 16 March 2018. On 7 April 2018, he scored his first goal in China as well as assisted Wang Jinxian's goal in a 2–2 home draw with Chongqing Dangdai Lifan.

=== Later career ===
On 14 March 2019, Gaitán signed for MLS side Chicago Fire on a free transfer for one season, with a club option until 2020.

On 31 January 2020, Gaitán joined Lille in France on a six-month contract until the end of the season. Gaitán left the Lille in June, having played only four games before the season was suspended due to the coronavirus pandemic.

On 11 August 2020, Gaitán signed for Portuguese club Braga on a one-year deal with an option for a further year, that season they won the Taça de Portugal.

After his one-year contract with Braga ended he signed for Uruguayan side Peñarol where he joined former teammate and friend Maxi Pereira, at the end of 2021 they celebrated winning the league.

On 31 January 2022, after already reaching an agreement with his previous club to end their contract, Paços de Ferreira and Gaitán reached a deal for a six-month contract with an option for a further year. At the end of the 2022–23 season, following Paços' relegation to the Liga Portugal 2, Gaitán left the club.

On 20 July 2024, Gaitán returned to Argentina to join Sarmiento, signing a contract until the end of 2025.

== International career ==
Gaitán made his international debut for Argentina on 13 October 2009, as a substitute in a 2–0 friendly win over Ghana, and he made his first start in a 3–2 success against Costa Rica on 26 January of the following year. During Sergio Batista term, he made three appearances, playing against Costa Rica, Nigeria and Poland. With Sabella, Gaitán did not make an appearance but with the appointment of Gerardo Martino, he returned after a two-year absence, playing the final minutes, after replacing Sergio Agüero on 3 September 2014 in an away win against Germany.

== Style of play ==
Gaitán began playing as a midfielder, sometimes leaning to the left. After moving to Benfica he assumed a more advanced role, where he seemed more comfortable.

A left-footer who is also able to play on the right, with good dribbling skills and close control, Gaitán's main asset is ball distribution as he is able to cross from either flank, and while on the right he possesses the vision to pick holes when cutting inside.

== Career statistics ==
=== Club ===
As of match played 14 December 2024

Appearances and goals by club, season and competition
Club	Season	League			National cup		League cup		Continental		Other		Total	
Club	Season	Division	Apps	Goals	Apps	Goals	Apps	Goals	Apps	Goals	Apps	Goals	Apps	Goals
Boca Juniors	2007–08	Argentine Primera División	1	0	—		—		0	0	—		1	0
Boca Juniors	2008–09	Argentine Primera División	32	5	—		—		11	1	—		43	6
Boca Juniors	2009–10	Argentine Primera División	33	7	—		—		2	0	—		35	7
Boca Juniors	Total		66	12	0	0	0	0	13	1	0	0	79	13
Benfica	2010–11	Primeira Liga	26	7	5	1	3	0	13 (Note: Five appearances in UEFA Champions League, eight appearances and one goal in UEFA Europa League)	1	1 (Note: Appearance in Supertaça Cândido de Oliveira)	0	48	9
Benfica	2011–12	Primeira Liga	25	3	1	0	4	0	14 (Note: Appearances in UEFA Champions League)	1	—		44	4
Benfica	2012–13	Primeira Liga	23	3	6	1	2	0	13 (Note: Four appearances in UEFA Champions League, nine appearances and one goal in UEFA Europa League)	1	—		44	5
Benfica	2013–14	Primeira Liga	26	4	5	1	2	1	10 (Note: Five appearances and one goal in UEFA Champions League, five appearances and one goal in UEFA Europa League)	2	—		43	8
Benfica	2014–15	Primeira Liga	27	4	2	0	2	0	5	0	1	0	37	4
Benfica	2015–16	Primeira Liga	25	4	1	0	2	3	8	4	1	0	37	11
Benfica	Total		152	25	20	3	15	4	63	9	3	0	253	41
Atlético Madrid	2016–17	La Liga	23	3	4	1	—		5	0	—		32	4
Atlético Madrid	2017–18	La Liga	6	0	2	0	—		5 (Note: Four appearances in UEFA Champions League, one appearance in UEFA Europa League)	0	—		13	0
Atlético Madrid	Total		29	3	6	1	0	0	10	0	0	0	45	4
Dalian Yifang	2018	Chinese Super League	28	2	2	0	—		—		—		30	2
Chicago Fire	2019	MLS	27	4	1	0	—		—		—		28	4
Lille	2019–20	Ligue 1	4	0	—		—		—		—		4	0
Braga	2020–21	Primeira Liga	18	2	1	0	0	0	4 (Note: Appearances in UEFA Europa League)	1	—		23	3
Peñarol	2021	Uruguayan Primera División	8	0	—		—		2 (Note: Appearances in Copa Sudamericana)	0	—		10	0
Paços de Ferreira	2021–22	Primeira Liga	6	2	0	0	0	0	0	0	—		6	2
Paços de Ferreira	2022–23	Primeira Liga	27	3	0	0	2	0	0	0	—		29	3
Paços de Ferreira	Total		33	5	0	0	2	0	0	0	0	0	35	5
Sarmiento	2024	Argentine Primera División	16	1	0	0	0	0	—		—		16	1
Career total			381	54	30	4	17	4	92	11	3	0	523	73

=== International ===
As of match played 12 October 2016

Appearances and goals by national team and year
National team	Year	Apps	Goals
Argentina	2009	1	0
Argentina	2010	2	0
Argentina	2011	3	0
Argentina	2014	3	2
Argentina	2015	3	0
Argentina	2016	7	0
Total		19	2

Scores and results list Argentina's goal tally first

Goal	Date	Venue	Opponent	Score	Result	Competition
1.	14 October 2014	Hong Kong Stadium, Wanchai, Hong Kong	Hong Kong	3–0	7–0	Friendly
2.	14 October 2014	Hong Kong Stadium, Wanchai, Hong Kong	Hong Kong	6–0	7–0	Friendly

== Honours ==
Boca Juniors

- Argentine Primera División: 2008 Apertura

Benfica

- Primeira Liga: 2013–14, 2014–15, 2015–16
- Taça de Portugal: 2013–14
- Taça da Liga: 2010–11, 2011–12, 2013–14, 2014–15, 2015–16
- Supertaça Cândido de Oliveira: 2014
- UEFA Europa League runner-up: 2012–13, 2013–14

Atlético Madrid

- UEFA Europa League: 2017–18

Braga

- Taça de Portugal: 2020–21

Peñarol

- Uruguayan Primera División: 2021

Argentina

- Copa América runner-up: 2016

Individual

- Primeira Liga Breakthrough Player of the Year: 2010–11
- Primeira Liga top assist provider: 2015–16
- UEFA Champions League top assist provider: 2011–12
- UEFA Europa League Squad of the Season: 2013–14
- Cosme Damião Awards – Footballer of the Year: 2014
- 2016 Taça da Liga Final: Man of the Match
