= Wang Yaopeng =

Chinese footballer

Wang Yaopeng 王耀鹏
Personal information
- Date of birth: 18 January 1995 (age 31)
- Place of birth: Dalian, Liaoning, China
- Height: 1.86 m (6 ft 1 in)
- Position: Defender

Team information
- Current team: Dalian K'un City
- Number: 13

Youth career
- Dalian Aerbin

Senior career*
| Years | Team | Apps | (Gls) |
| 2013 | Liaoning Youth | 4 | (0) |
| 2014–2023 | Dalian Pro | 98 | (3) |
| 2024–2025 | Changchun Yatai | 10 | (1) |
| 2026– | Dalian K'un City | 0 | (0) |
- * Club domestic league appearances and goals as of 28 August 2025

Wang Yaopeng (Chinese: 王耀鹏; pinyin: Wáng Yàopéng; born 18 January 1995) is a Chinese professional footballer who plays as a defender for China League One club Dalian K'un City.

== Club career ==
Wang Yaopeng started his professional football career in 2013 when he was loaned to China League Two side Liaoning Youth for the 2013 China League Two. He was promoted to Chinese Super League side Dalian Aerbin (now known as Dalian Professional) by manager Ma Lin in 2014. On 16 April 2015, he made his debut for the club in a 2–0 win against amateur club Hangzhou Ange in the 2015 Chinese FA Cup. He made his league debut on 16 May 2015 in a 3–1 away win over Shenzhen FC, coming on as a substitute for Zou You in the 72nd minute.

He would mainly play for the reserve team while Dalian Yifang was in the second tier, however he would be part of the squad that won the division and promotion to the top tier at the end of the 2017 China League One campaign. On 3 March 2018, he made his Super League debut in an 8–0 crushing defeat against Shanghai SIPG, coming on for Sun Guowen in the 66th minute. Despite this result, Wang would keep his place within the team and helped ensure the club remained within the division at the end of the season. On 23 November 2019, Wang scored his first Chinese Super League goal for the club in a 3-3 home draw against Hebei China Fortune.

On 7 February 2024, Wang joined fellow Chinese Super League club Changchun Yatai, following the dissolution of Dalian Pro.

On 11 February 2026, Wang joined China League One club Dalian K'un City.

== Career statistics ==
As of 4 November 2023.

Appearances and goals by club, season and competition
| Club | Season | League | | | National Cup | | Continental | | Other | | Total | |
| Club | Season | Division | Apps | Goals | Apps | Goals | Apps | Goals | Apps | Goals | Apps | Goals |
|---|---|---|---|---|---|---|---|---|---|---|---|---|
| Liaoning Youth | 2013 | China League Two | 4 | 0 | - | | - | | - | | 4 | 0 |
| Dalian Yifang / Dalian Professional | 2014 | Chinese Super League | 0 | 0 | 0 | 0 | - | | - | | 0 | 0 |
| Dalian Yifang / Dalian Professional | 2015 | China League One | 1 | 0 | 2 | 0 | - | | - | | 3 | 0 |
| Dalian Yifang / Dalian Professional | 2016 | China League One | 2 | 0 | 2 | 0 | - | | - | | 4 | 0 |
| Dalian Yifang / Dalian Professional | 2017 | China League One | 1 | 0 | 2 | 0 | - | | - | | 3 | 0 |
| Dalian Yifang / Dalian Professional | 2018 | Chinese Super League | 22 | 0 | 3 | 0 | - | | - | | 25 | 0 |
| Dalian Yifang / Dalian Professional | 2019 | Chinese Super League | 18 | 1 | 3 | 0 | - | | - | | 21 | 1 |
| Dalian Yifang / Dalian Professional | 2020 | Chinese Super League | 18 | 2 | 0 | 0 | - | | - | | 18 | 2 |
| Dalian Yifang / Dalian Professional | 2021 | Chinese Super League | 12 | 0 | 2 | 0 | - | | 1 (Note: Appearance(s) in Promotion/Relegation Play-offs) | 0 | 15 | 0 |
| Dalian Yifang / Dalian Professional | 2022 | Chinese Super League | 13 | 0 | 1 | 0 | - | | - | | 14 | 0 |
| Dalian Yifang / Dalian Professional | 2022 | Chinese Super League | 11 | 0 | 1 | 0 | - | | - | | 12 | 0 |
| Dalian Yifang / Dalian Professional | Total | | 98 | 3 | 16 | 0 | 0 | 0 | 1 | 0 | 115 | 3 |
| Career total | | | 102 | 3 | 15 | 0 | 0 | 0 | 1 | 0 | 119 | 3 |

== Honours ==
=== Club ===
Dalian Yifang/ Dalian Professional

- China League One: 2017.
