= Dong Honglin =

Chinese footballer

Dong Honglin 董洪麟
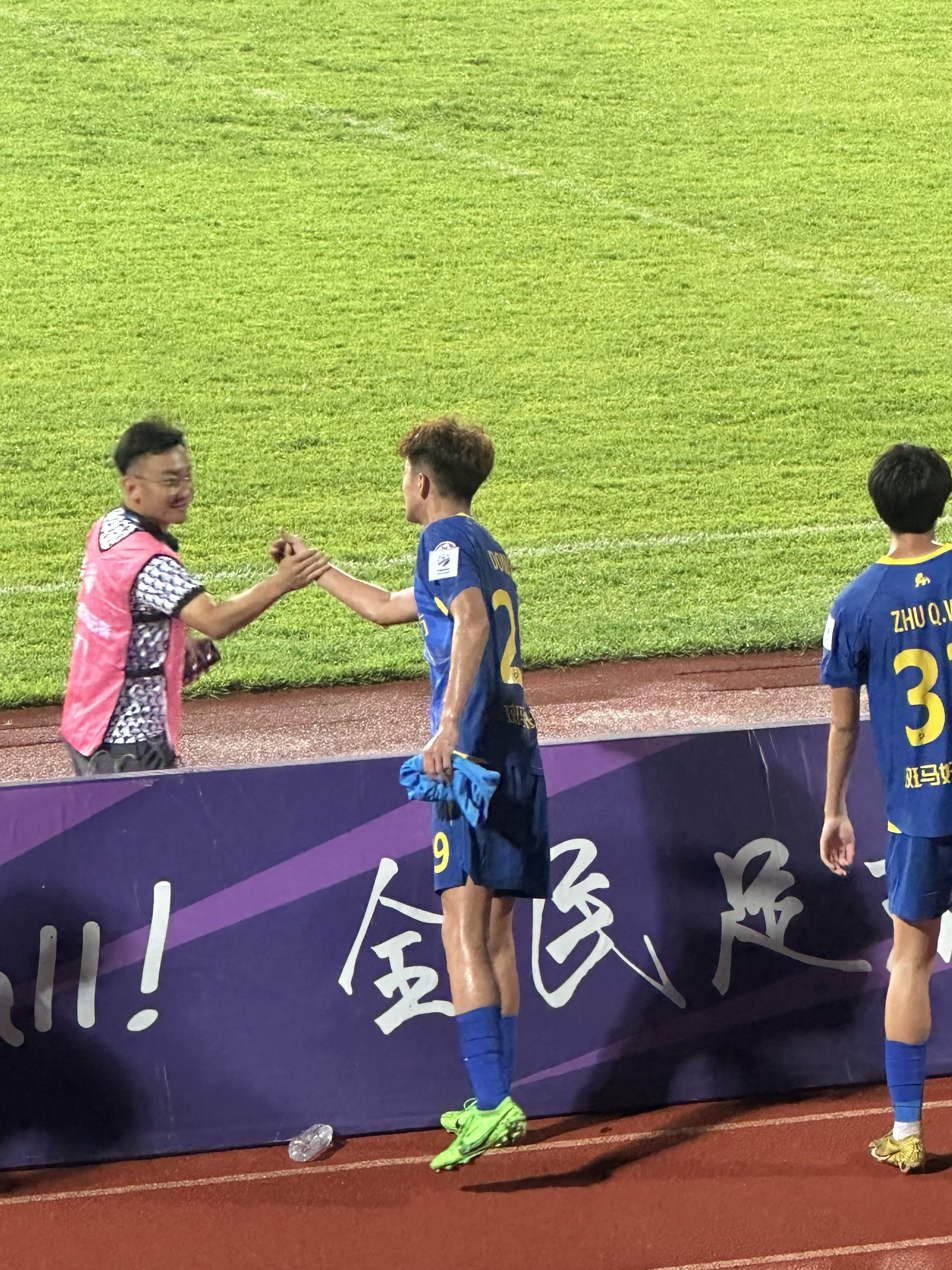
- Dong Honglin in August 2024

Personal information
- Date of birth: 15 January 1996 (age 30)
- Place of birth: Dalian, Liaoning, China
- Height: 1.84 m (6 ft 1/2 in)
- Positions: Midfielder; forward; defender

Team information
- Current team: Nanjing City
- Number: 18

Youth career
- Dalian Yifang

Senior career*
Years	Team	Apps	(Gls)
2016–2018	Dalian Yifang	4	(0)
2019–2021	Chongqing Lifan	29	(3)
2022	Changchun Yatai	7	(0)
2023–2024	Suzhou Dongwu	35	(5)
2024–	Nanjing City	38	(8)
- * Club domestic league appearances and goals as of 9 March 2026

Dong Honglin (Chinese: 董洪麟; pinyin: Dǒng Hónglín; born 15 January 1996) is a Chinese footballer who currently plays for China League One side Nanjing City.

== Club career ==
Dong Honglin started his professional football career in 2016 when he was promoted to China League One side Dalian Yifang's first team squad. On 12 March 2016, he made his senior debut in a league game in a 2–0 home win over Zhejiang Yiteng, coming on for Sun Bo in the 89th minute. Throughout the 2017 league season he would be a peripheral member of the squad as Dalian won the division championship and promotion to the Chinese Super League. He would receive trials with Shenzhen before the 2017 season and with Tianjin TEDA before the 2018 season but eventually stayed at Dalian due to disagreements with the transfer fee. On 24 April 2018, Dong assisted Sun Guowen's opener in a 4–1 away win over Liaoning in the 2018 Chinese FA Cup. On 2 May 2018, he played in another FA Cup match against Chongqing Dangdai Lifan where he was substituted off due to injury.

On 1 February 2019, Dong transferred to fellow Super League side Chongqing Lifan. He would make his debut for the club on 1 May 2019, in a FA Cup match against Hebei China Fortune in a 1-0 victory. This was followed by his league debut on 5 May 2019, against Tianjin Tianhai in a 3-3 draw. On 29 May 2019, he would score his first senior goal against Shanghai Shenhua in a FA Cup match that ended in a 3-2 defeat.

== Career statistics ==
As of 22 June 2025.

Appearances and goals by club, season and competition
Club	Season	League			National Cup		Continental		Other		Total	
Club	Season	Division	Apps	Goals	Apps	Goals	Apps	Goals	Apps	Goals	Apps	Goals
Dalian Yifang	2016	China League One	4	0	2	0	-		-		6	0
Dalian Yifang	2017	China League One	0	0	2	0	-		-		2	0
Dalian Yifang	2018	Chinese Super League	0	0	3	0	-		-		3	0
Dalian Yifang	Total		4	0	7	0	0	0	0	0	11	0
Chongqing Lifan	2019	Chinese Super League	3	0	2	1	-		-		5	1
Chongqing Lifan	2020	Chinese Super League	9	2	1	1	-		-		10	3
Chongqing Lifan	2021	Chinese Super League	17	1	2	0	-		-		19	1
Chongqing Lifan	Total		29	3	5	2	0	0	0	0	34	5
Changchun Yatai	2022	Chinese Super League	7	0	1	0	-		-		8	0
Suzhou Dongwu	2023	China League One	21	4	1	1	-		-		22	5
Suzhou Dongwu	2024	China League One	14	1	1	0	-		-		25	1
Suzhou Dongwu	Total		35	5	2	1	0	0	0	0	37	6
Nanjing City	2024	China League One	11	1	1	0	-		-		12	1
Nanjing City	2025	China League One	12	5	0	0	-		-		12	5
Nanjing City	Total		23	6	1	0	0	0	0	0	24	6
Career total			98	14	16	3	0	0	0	0	114	17

== Honours ==
=== Club ===
Dalian Yifang

- China League One: 2017
