= 2020 Chinese Super League =

Professional football season

Chinese Super League
- Season: 2020
- Dates: 25 July – 12 November 2020
- Champions: Jiangsu Suning (1st title)
- AFC Champions League: Guangzhou Evergrande Taobao; Beijing Sinobo Guoan; Shanghai SIPG
- Matches: 160
- Goals: 451 (2.82 per match)
- Top goalscorer: Cédric Bakambu (14 goals)
- Biggest home win: GZE 5–0 HBC (21 October 2020)
- Biggest away win: GZF 0–5 GZE (30 July 2020)
- Highest scoring: HN 3–4 JSS (26 July 2020); JSS 5–2 HN (30 August 2020); BJS 5–2 CQ (1 September 2020)
- Longest winning run: 6 matches Chongqing Dangdai Lifan
- Longest unbeaten run: 8 matches Guangzhou Evergrande Taobao; Shanghai SIPG; Jiangsu Suning
- Longest winless run: 14 matches Tianjin TEDA
- Longest losing run: 8 matches Tianjin TEDA
- Highest attendance: 9,386; GZE 1–2 JSS (12 November 2020)
- Lowest attendance: 78; HN 0–0 TTD (6 November 2020)
- Total attendance: 41,525
- Average attendance: 1,597

The 2020 Chinese Super League, officially known as the 2020 Ping An Chinese Football Association Super League (Chinese: 2020中国平安中国足球协会超级联赛) for sponsorship reasons, was the 17th season since the establishment of the Chinese Super League. The season was scheduled to begin on 22 February and to end on 31 October, but was postponed following the COVID-19 pandemic. On 1 July 2020, the Chinese Football Association announced that the season would be split into two stages. In the first stage, which began on 25 July 2020 and concluded on 29 September 2020, 16 teams were split into two groups in two locations, one in Dalian and the other in Suzhou. On 2 September 2020, the Chinese Football Association announced that the second stage would begin on 16 October 2020 and conclude on 12 November 2020.

Jiangsu Suning beat defending champions Guangzhou Evergrande Taobao 2–1 on aggregate in the finals to win their first and only top-flight title: three months after the season, Jiangsu folded.

As a result, fourth-placed Shanghai SIPG gained a place in the 2021 AFC Champions League along with Guangzhou and Beijing Sinobo Guoan, while Shijiazhuang Ever Bright avoided relegation.

== Club changes ==
Clubs promoted from 2019 China League One

- Qingdao Huanghai
- Shijiazhuang Ever Bright

Clubs relegated to 2020 China League One

- Beijing Renhe

Dissolved entries

- ~~Tianjin Tianhai~~

Shijiazhuang Ever Bright return to the division after a 3-year absence. Qingdao Huanghai compete in the Chinese Super League for the first time in the club's history. Beijing Renhe were relegated to China League One after spending 2 seasons in the Chinese Super League. Shenzhen were reprieved from relegation after finishing second-bottom due to the dissolution of Tianjin Tianhai.

=== Name changes ===
- Dalian Yifang F.C. changed their name to Dalian Pro in January 2020.

== Clubs ==
=== Personnel and stadiums ===
Team	Head coach	City	Stadium	Capacity	2019 season
Guangzhou Evergrande Taobao	(Italy) Fabio Cannavaro	Guangzhou	Tianhe Stadium	54,856	1st
Beijing Sinobo Guoan	(France) Bruno Génésio	Beijing	Workers' Stadium	66,161	2nd
Shanghai SIPG	(Portugal) Vítor Pereira	Shanghai	Yuanshen Sports Centre Stadium	16,000	3rd
Jiangsu Suning	(Romania) Cosmin Olăroiu	Nanjing	Nanjing Olympic Sports Centre	61,443	4th
Shandong Luneng Taishan	(China) Hao Wei	Jinan	Jinan Olympic Sports Center Stadium	56,808	5th
Wuhan Zall	(China) Pang Li (caretaker)	Wuhan	Wuhan Five Rings Sports Center	30,000	6th
Tianjin TEDA	(China) Wang Baoshan	Tianjin	Tianjin Olympic Centre	54,696	7th
Henan Jianye	(Spain) Javier Pereira	Zhengzhou	Hanghai Stadium	29,860	8th
Dalian Pro	(Spain) Rafael Benítez	Dalian	Dalian Sports Centre Stadium	60,832	9th
Chongqing Dangdai Lifan	(South Korea) Chang Woe-ryong	Chongqing	Chongqing Olympic Sports Center	58,680	10th
Hebei China Fortune	(China) Xie Feng	Langfang	Langfang Stadium	30,040	11th
Guangzhou R&F	(Netherlands) Giovanni van Bronckhorst	Guangzhou	Yuexiushan Stadium	18,000	12th
Shanghai Greenland Shenhua	(South Korea) Choi Kang-hee	Shanghai	Hongkou Football Stadium	33,060	13th
Qingdao Huanghai ^{P}	(China) Wu Jingui	Qingdao	Conson Stadium	45,000	CL1, 1st
Shijiazhuang Ever Bright ^{P}	(Iran) Afshin Ghotbi	Shijiazhuang	Yutong International Sports Center	29,000	CL1, 2nd
Shenzhen	(Netherlands) Jordi Cruyff	Shenzhen	Shenzhen Universiade Sports Centre	60,334	15th

=== Locations ===
Location of teams in the 2020 Chinese Super League

=== Managerial changes ===
Team	Outgoing manager	Manner of departure	Date of vacancy	Position in table	Incoming manager	Date of appointment
Chongqing Dangdai Lifan	(Netherlands) Jordi Cruyff	Mutual consent	14 December 2019	Pre-season	(South Korea) Chang Woe-ryong	18 December 2019
Wuhan Zall	(China) Li Tie	Signed by China	2 January 2020	Pre-season	(Spain) José González	4 January 2020
Guangzhou R&F	(Serbia) Dragan Stojković	Mutual consent	3 January 2020	Pre-season	(Netherlands) Giovanni van Bronckhorst	4 January 2020
Qingdao Huanghai	(Spain) Juan Manuel Lillo	Mutual consent	5 June 2020	Pre-season	(China) Wu Jingui	4 August 2020
Henan Jianye	(China) Wang Baoshan	Mutual consent	6 July 2020	Pre-season	(China) Yang Ji (caretaker)	9 July 2020
Shenzhen	(Italy) Roberto Donadoni	Sacked	11 August 2020	Group A, 6th	(Netherlands) Jordi Cruyff	14 August 2020
Tianjin TEDA	(Germany) Uli Stielike	Sacked	19 August 2020	Group B, 8th	(China) Wang Baoshan	19 August 2020
Henan Jianye	(China) Yang Ji (caretaker)	End of caretaker spell	11 September 2020	Group A, 8th	(Spain) Javier Pereira	11 September 2020
Wuhan Zall	(Spain) José González	Sacked	24 September 2020	Group B, 6th	(China) Pang Li (caretaker)	24 September 2020
Shandong Luneng Taishan	(China) Li Xiaopeng	Mutual consent	5 October 2020	Group A, 3rd	(China) Hao Wei	5 October 2020

=== Coach nationality ===
country	Number
China	5
Netherlands	2
Spain	2
South Korea	2
Iran	1
Portugal	1
Italy	1
France	1
Romania	1

=== Foreign players ===
- Foreign players: The number of foreign players (excluding goalkeepers) that clubs can register over the course of the season is increased from six to seven and the number of foreign players allowed on each CSL team at any given time is also increased from four to five. A maximum of five foreign players can be registered for each match with a maximum of four can be fielded at any time during the match.
- Naturalized players: There is no limits in registering naturalized players. There is no limits in fielding Chinese-descent naturalized players. However, only one non-Chinese-descent naturalized player can be fielded as native player while other non-Chinese-descent naturalized player(s) fielded will be counted as foreign player(s).
- Hong Kong, Macau, or Taiwan players: Each club can register one Hong Kong, Macau, or Taiwan player of Chinese descent (excluding goalkeepers), provided that he was registered as a professional footballer in one of those three associations for the first time in his career, as a native player.
- Players name in **bold** indicates the players that were registered during the mid-season transfer window.
- Players name in ITALICS indicates the players that left their respective clubs during the mid-season transfer window.

Team	Player 1	Player 2	Player 3	Player 4	Player 5	Naturalized players	Hong Kong/Macau/ Taiwan Players^{1}	Reserves players	Former players
Beijing Sinobo Guoan	(Brazil) Fernando	(Brazil) Renato Augusto	(Democratic Republic of the Congo) Cédric Bakambu	(South Korea) Kim Min-jae	(Spain) Jonathan Viera	(Brazil) → (China) Alan (England) → (China) Nico Yennaris (Norway) → (China) John Hou Sæter			
Chongqing Dangdai Lifan	(Brazil) Alan Kardec	(Brazil) Fernandinho	(Brazil) Marcelo Cirino	(Brazil) Marcinho					(Poland) Adrian Mierzejewski
Dalian Pro	(Brazil) **Jailson**	(Ghana) Emmanuel Boateng	(Sweden) Marcus Danielson	(Sweden) Sam Larsson	(Venezuela) Salomón Rondón			(Slovakia) Marek Hamšík	
Guangzhou Evergrande Taobao	(Brazil) Paulinho	(Brazil) Talisca	(South Korea) Park Ji-soo			(Brazil) → (China) Aloísio (Brazil) → (China) Elkeson (Brazil) → (China) Fernandinho (England) → (China) Tyias Browning			
Guangzhou R&F	(Belgium) Mousa Dembélé	(Brazil) Renatinho	(Netherlands) **Richairo Živković**	(Poland) **Adrian Mierzejewski**	(Serbia) Duško Tošić		(Hong Kong) Tan Chun Lok		(Israel) Dia Saba (Israel) Eran Zahavi
Hebei China Fortune	(Bosnia and Herzegovina) Samir Memišević	(Brazil) Marcão	(Brazil) Paulinho	(Sierra Leone) Mohamed Buya Turay		(Brazil) → (China) Ricardo Goulart			
Henan Jianye	**(Bosnia and Herzegovina) Toni Šunjić**	(Brazil) Fernando Karanga	(Brazil) Henrique Dourado	(Brazil) Ivo	(Cameroon) Christian Bassogog		(Chinese Taipei) Tim Chow	(South Korea) Kim Sung-hwan	
Jiangsu Suning	(Brazil) Alex Teixeira	(Brazil) Miranda	(Croatia) Ivan Santini	(Ghana) Mubarak Wakaso	(Italy) Éder				
Qingdao Huanghai	(Cameroon) Joseph Minala	(Croatia) **Dejan Radonjić**	(France) Romain Alessandrini	(Serbia) Jagoš Vuković	(Slovenia) **Denis Popović**		(Chinese Taipei) Yaki Yen		(Brazil) Cléo
Shandong Luneng Taishan	(Belgium) Marouane Fellaini	(Brazil) Moisés	**(Brazil) Róger Guedes**	(Hungary) Tamás Kádár	(Italy) Graziano Pellè			(Brazil) Leonardo	
Shanghai Greenland Shenhua	(Cameroon) Stéphane Mbia	(Colombia) Giovanni Moreno	(Ecuador) **Fidel Martínez**	(Ecuador) **Miller Bolaños**	(South Korea) Kim Shin-wook	(Gabon) → (China) Alexander N'Doumbou		(Italy) Stephan El Shaarawy	(Nigeria) Obafemi Martins
Shanghai SIPG	(Australia) **Aaron Mooy**	(Austria) Marko Arnautović	(Brazil) Hulk	(Brazil) Oscar	(Brazil) Ricardo Lopes				(Uzbekistan) Odil Ahmedov
Shenzhen	(Cameroon) John Mary	(Colombia) Harold Preciado	(Iran) **Morteza Pouraliganji**	(Norway) Ole Selnæs	(South Korea) Song Ju-hun		(Hong Kong) Dai Wai Tsun	(Republic of the Congo) Thievy Bifouma (Switzerland) Blerim Džemaili	
Shijiazhuang Ever Bright	(Brazil) Matheus	(Brazil) Muriqui	(Brazil) Rômulo	(Democratic Republic of the Congo) Oscar Maritu	(Zambia) Stoppila Sunzu				
Tianjin TEDA	(Brazil) **Sandro Lima**	(Brazil) **Tiquinho Soares**	(Germany) Felix Bastians	(Ghana) Frank Acheampong	(Uzbekistan) **Odil Ahmedov**			(Brazil) Johnathan Goiano	
Wuhan Zall	(Brazil) Léo Baptistão	(France) Eddy Gnahoré	(Ivory Coast) Jean Evrard Kouassi	(Nigeria) **Obafemi Martins**	(Portugal) Daniel Carriço			(Brazil) Rafael Silva	

- **^1** For Hong Kong, Macau, or Taiwanese players, if they are non-naturalized and were registered as professional footballers in Hong Kong's, Macau's, or Chinese Taipei's football association for the first time, they are recognized as native players. Otherwise they are recognized as foreign players.

== Regular season ==
=== Group A ===
==== Stadiums ====
- Dalian Sports Centre Stadium
- Dalian Youth Football Training Base Main Stadium
- Jinzhou Stadium
- Puwan Stadium (Reserve)

==== League table ====
Pos	Team	Pld	W	D	L	GF	GA	GD	Pts	Qualification or relegation
1	Guangzhou Evergrande Taobao (Q)	14	11	1	2	31	12	+19	34	Qualification for Championship stage
2	Jiangsu Suning (C, Q)	14	7	5	2	23	15	+8	26	Qualification for Championship stage
3	Shandong Luneng Taishan (Q)	14	7	3	4	19	11	+8	24	Qualification for Championship stage
4	Shanghai Greenland Shenhua (Q)	14	5	6	3	16	15	+1	21	Qualification for Championship stage
5	Shenzhen (Q)	14	5	2	7	20	20	0	17	Qualification for Relegation stage
6	Guangzhou R&F (Q)	14	4	3	7	14	28	−14	15	Qualification for Relegation stage
7	Dalian Pro (Q)	14	2	5	7	18	21	−3	11	Qualification for Relegation stage
8	Henan Jianye (Q)	14	1	3	10	14	33	−19	6	Qualification for Relegation stage

Source: CSL, Soccerway
Rules for classification:
- During season: 1) Points; 2) Goal difference; 3) Goals scored.
- After season: 1) Points; 2) Head-to-head points; 3) Head-to-head goal difference; 4) Head-to-head goals scored; 5) Scores of the weight ratio of the reserve league and youth leagues.
  (C) Champions; (Q) Qualified for the phase indicated

==== Results ====
Home \ Away	DLY	GZE	HN	GZF	JSS	SD	SGS	SZ
Dalian Pro	—	2–2	1–1	0–1	1–1	2–3	1–1	1–3
Guangzhou Evergrande Taobao	1–0	—	2–1	2–1	2–1	0–1	2–0	2–0
Henan Jianye	0–4	1–3	—	1–1	3–4	0–2	0–0	1–3
Guangzhou R&F	1–0	0–5	3–1	—	0–2	1–5	0–2	0–2
Jiangsu Suning	2–1	2–1	5–2	3–3	—	0–0	0–1	1–1
Shandong Luneng Taishan	0–1	1–2	2–1	0–0	0–1	—	0–1	2–0
Shanghai Greenland Shenhua	2–2	1–4	2–0	2–3	0–0	1–1	—	3–2
Shenzhen	3–2	1–3	1–2	3–0	0–1	1–2	0–0	—

Source: CSL Soccerway
Legend: Blue = home team win; Yellow = draw; Red = away team win.
For upcoming matches, an "a" indicates there is an article about the rivalry between the two participants.

==== Positions by round ====
To preserve chronological evolvements, any postponed matches are not included to the round at which they were originally scheduled, but added to the full round they were played immediately afterwards. For example, if a match is scheduled for round 7, but then played between rounds 8 and 9, it will be added to the standings for round 8.

Team ╲ Round	1	2	3	4	5	6	7	8	9	10	11	12	13	14
Guangzhou Evergrande Taobao	2	1	1	2	1	1	1	1	1	1	1	1	1	1
Jiangsu Suning	3	2	2	1	2	3	3	3	2	2	2	2	3	2
Shandong Luneng Taishan	4	3	4	3	3	2	2	2	3	3	3	3	2	3
Shanghai Greenland Shenhua	7	5	3	4	4	4	4	4	4	4	5	4	4	4
Shenzhen	1	4	5	6	7	6	6	5	5	5	4	5	5	5
Guangzhou R&F	8	8	8	8	6	5	5	6	7	7	7	6	6	6
Dalian Pro	6	7	7	7	8	8	8	7	6	6	6	7	7	7
Henan Jianye	5	6	6	5	5	7	7	8	8	8	8	8	8	8

Qualification to Championship stage
Qualification to Relegation stage

Source: CSL

==== Results by match played ====
Team ╲ Round	1	2	3	4	5	6	7	8	9	10	11	12	13	14
Dalian Pro	L	D	L	D	L	L	D	W	W	D	D	L	L	L
Guangzhou Evergrande Taobao	W	W	W	L	W	W	D	W	W	W	W	W	L	W
Guangzhou R&F	L	L	D	L	W	W	L	L	L	W	D	W	L	D
Henan Jianye	L	D	D	W	L	L	D	L	L	L	L	L	L	L
Jiangsu Suning	W	D	W	W	L	L	D	W	W	D	D	D	W	W
Shandong Luneng Taishan	W	D	L	W	W	W	W	L	L	D	L	W	W	D
Shanghai Greenland Shenhua	L	W	W	D	W	L	D	L	D	D	D	D	W	W
Shenzhen	W	L	L	L	L	W	D	W	D	L	W	L	W	L

Source: CSL
W = Win; D = Draw; L = Loss

=== Group B ===
==== Stadiums ====
- Kunshan Sports Centre Stadium
- Suzhou Olympic Sports Centre
- Suzhou Sports Center
- Changshu Stadium (Reserve)

==== League table ====
Pos	Team	Pld	W	D	L	GF	GA	GD	Pts	Qualification or relegation
1	Shanghai SIPG (Q)	14	10	2	2	26	11	+15	32	Qualification for Championship stage
2	Beijing Sinobo Guoan (Q)	14	8	4	2	36	19	+17	28	Qualification for Championship stage
3	Chongqing Dangdai Lifan (Q)	14	7	3	4	22	19	+3	24 (Note: Head-to-head results: Chongqing Dangdai Lifan 3–1 Hebei China Fortune, Hebei China Fortune 2–2 Chongqing Dangdai Lifan)	Qualification for Championship stage
4	Hebei China Fortune (Q)	14	7	3	4	25	23	+2	24	Qualification for Championship stage
5	Wuhan Zall (Q)	14	5	2	7	16	16	0	17 (Note: Head-to-head results: Shijiazhuang Ever Bright 1–0 Wuhan Zall, Wuhan Zall 2–1 Shijiazhuang Ever Bright)	Qualification for Relegation stage
6	Shijiazhuang Ever Bright (Q)	14	4	5	5	18	21	−3	17	Qualification for Relegation stage
7	Qingdao Huanghai (Q)	14	2	4	8	15	27	−12	10	Qualification for Relegation stage
8	Tianjin TEDA (Q)	14	0	3	11	8	30	−22	3	Qualification for Relegation stage

Source: CSL
Rules for classification:
- During season: 1) Points; 2) Goal difference; 3) Goals scored.
- After season: 1) Points; 2) Head-to-head points; 3) Head-to-head goal difference; 4) Head-to-head goals scored; 5) Scores of the weight ratio of the reserve league and youth leagues.
  (Q) Qualified for the phase indicated
  Notes:

==== Results ====
Home \ Away	BJS	CQ	HBC	QDH	SSI	SJZ	TTD	WH
Beijing Sinobo Guoan	—	5–2	3–1	5–1	1–2	4–0	2–0	1–0
Chongqing Dangdai Lifan	1–2	—	3–1	0–0	1–0	1–0	2–2	1–0
Hebei China Fortune	3–3	2–2	—	3–1	2–0	2–2	2–0	3–1
Qingdao Huanghai	3–3	0–3	1–2	—	1–1	0–1	3–0	0–3
Shanghai SIPG	1–0	3–0	4–0	2–1	—	1–1	4–1	2–1
Shijiazhuang Ever Bright	2–2	1–4	3–1	2–2	0–1	—	3–0	1–0
Tianjin TEDA	1–3	1–2	0–1	0–2	1–3	1–1	—	0–0
Wuhan Zall	2–2	2–0	0–2	2–0	1–2	2–1	2–1	—

Source: CSL
Legend: Blue = home team win; Yellow = draw; Red = away team win.
For upcoming matches, an "a" indicates there is an article about the rivalry between the two participants.

==== Positions by round ====
To preserve chronological evolvements, any postponed matches are not included to the round at which they were originally scheduled, but added to the full round they were played immediately afterwards. For example, if a match is scheduled for round 7, but then played between rounds 8 and 9, it will be added to the standings for round 8.

Team ╲ Round	1	2	3	4	5	6	7	8	9	10	11	12	13	14
Shanghai SIPG	1	1	2	2	2	1	1	1	1	1	1	1	1	1
Beijing Sinobo Guoan	3	2	1	1	1	2	2	2	2	2	2	2	2	2
Chongqing Dangdai Lifan	6	5	4	5	7	7	7	7	6	6	5	3	3	3
Hebei China Fortune	4	8	7	7	5	4	4	4	4	5	6	4	4	4
Wuhan Zall	2	3	3	3	3	3	3	3	3	4	4	6	6	5
Shijiazhuang Ever Bright	4	4	4	4	4	6	6	5	5	3	3	5	5	6
Qingdao Huanghai	8	7	6	6	6	5	5	6	7	7	7	7	7	7
Tianjin TEDA	7	6	8	8	8	8	8	8	8	8	8	8	8	8

Qualification to Championship stage
Qualification to Relegation stage

Source: CSL

==== Results by match played ====
Team ╲ Round	1	2	3	4	5	6	7	8	9	10	11	12	13	14
Beijing Sinobo Guoan	W	W	W	W	D	L	D	W	D	W	D	W	L	W
Chongqing Dangdai Lifan	L	D	D	D	L	W	L	L	W	W	W	W	W	W
Hebei China Fortune	D	L	D	L	W	W	W	L	W	L	D	W	W	W
Qingdao Huanghai	L	D	D	D	D	W	L	L	L	L	L	L	W	L
Shanghai SIPG	W	W	D	W	D	W	W	W	L	W	W	W	W	L
Shijiazhuang Ever Bright	D	D	L	W	D	L	D	W	W	W	D	L	L	L
Tianjin TEDA	L	D	L	L	L	L	L	L	L	L	D	L	L	D
Wuhan Zall	W	L	W	L	W	L	W	W	D	L	L	L	L	D

Source: CSL
W = Win; D = Draw; L = Loss

== Championship stage ==
=== Bracket ===
Quarter-finals
Guangzhou Evergrande Taobao	3	5	8
Hebei China Fortune	1	0	1
Beijing Sinobo Guoan	2	2	4
Shandong Luneng Taishan	2	1	3
Jiangsu Suning	1	1	2
Chongqing Dangdai Lifan	1	0	1
Shanghai SIPG (p)	0	1	1 (5)
Shanghai Greenland Shenhua	0	1	1 (4)

Semi-finals
Guangzhou Evergrande Taobao	0	3	3
Beijing Sinobo Guoan	0	1	1
Jiangsu Suning (a.e.t.)	1	2	3
Shanghai SIPG	1	1	2

Finals
Guangzhou Evergrande Taobao	0	1	1
Jiangsu Suning	0	2	2
3rd–4th place playoffs
Beijing Sinobo Guoan	2	1	3
Shanghai SIPG	1	1	2

5th–8th place playoffs
Hebei China Fortune	2	3	5
Shandong Luneng Taishan (a.e.t.)	2	6	8
Chongqing Dangdai Lifan (p)	1	2	3 (10)
Shanghai Greenland Shenhua	3	0	3 (9)

5th–6th place playoffs
Shandong Luneng Taishan (p)	3	2	5 (4)
Chongqing Dangdai Lifan	4	1	5 (3)
7th–8th place playoffs
Hebei China Fortune	1	0	1
Shanghai Greenland Shenhua	4	1	5

=== Quarter-finals ===
Team 1	Agg.	Team 2	1st leg	2nd leg
Hebei China Fortune	1–8	Guangzhou Evergrande Taobao	1–3	0–5
Shandong Luneng Taishan	3–4	Beijing Sinobo Guoan	2–2	1–2
Shanghai Greenland Shenhua	1–1 (4–5 p)	Shanghai SIPG	0–0	1–1 (a.e.t.)
Chongqing Dangdai Lifan	1–2	Jiangsu Suning	1–1	0–1

==== First leg (Round 15) ====
16 October 2020
19:35 UTC+8

Hebei China Fortune	1–3	Guangzhou Evergrande Taobao
Yin Hongbo 37'	CSL Report	Wu Shaocong 64'; Elkeson 86' (pen.); Wei Shihao 90'

Kunshan Sports Centre Stadium, Kunshan
Attendance: 1,580
Referee: Shi Zhenlu

17 October 2020
15:30 UTC+8

Shandong Luneng Taishan	2–2	Beijing Sinobo Guoan
Pellè 24'; Jin Jingdao 36'	CSL Report	Bakambu 48' (pen.), 68'

Suzhou Sports Center, Suzhou
Attendance: 2,758
Referee: Shen Yinhao

18 October 2020
19:35 UTC+8

Shanghai Greenland Shenhua	0–0	Shanghai SIPG
	CSL Report

Suzhou Olympic Sports Centre, Suzhou
Attendance: 5,218
Referee: Guo Baolong

19 October 2020
19:35 UTC+8

Chongqing Dangdai Lifan	1–1	Jiangsu Suning
Kardec 72'	CSL Report	Teixeira 6'

Suzhou Sports Center, Suzhou
Attendance: 2,910
Referee: Zhang Lei

==== Second leg (Round 16) ====
21 October 2020
19:35 UTC+8

Guangzhou Evergrande Taobao	5–0	Hebei China Fortune
Talisca 26', 61'; Fernandinho 35', 55'; Paulinho 79'	CSL Report

Kunshan Sports Centre Stadium, Kunshan
Attendance: 832
Referee: Ai Kun

Guangzhou Evergrande Taobao won 8–1 on aggregate.

22 October 2020
19:35 UTC+8

Beijing Sinobo Guoan	2–1	Shandong Luneng Taishan
Zhang Yuning 18', 74'	CSL Report	Moisés 14'

Suzhou Sports Center, Suzhou
Attendance: 2,136
Referee: Kim Hee-gon (South Korea)

Beijing Sinobo Guoan won 4–3 on aggregate.

23 October 2020
19:35 UTC+8

Shanghai SIPG	1–1 (a.e.t.)	Shanghai Greenland Shenhua
Hulk 54' (pen.)	CSL Report	Sun Shilin 90'
Penalties
Hulk (penalty scored); Mooy (penalty scored); Lü Wenjun (penalty scored); Muzepper (penalty scored); Oscar (penalty scored)	5–4	(penalty missed) Moreno; (penalty scored) Bolaños; (penalty scored) Cao Yunding; (penalty scored) Yang Xu; (penalty scored) Sun Shilin

Suzhou Olympic Sports Centre, Suzhou
Attendance: 5,177
Referee: Ma Ning

1–1 on aggregate. Shanghai SIPG won 5–4 on penalties.

24 October 2020
19:35 UTC+8

Jiangsu Suning	1–0	Chongqing Dangdai Lifan
Santini 7'	CSL Report

Suzhou Olympic Sports Centre, Suzhou
Attendance: 2,950
Referee: Shi Zhenlu

Jiangsu Suning won 2–1 on aggregate.

=== Semi-finals ===
The winners will qualify for the 2021 AFC Champions League group stage.

Team 1	Agg.	Team 2	1st leg	2nd leg
Beijing Sinobo Guoan	1–3	Guangzhou Evergrande Taobao	0–0	1–3
Jiangsu Suning	3–2	Shanghai SIPG	1–1	2–1 (a.e.t.)

==== First leg (Round 17) ====
28 October 2020
19:35 UTC+8

Beijing Sinobo Guoan	0–0	Guangzhou Evergrande Taobao
	CSL Report

Suzhou Sports Center, Suzhou
Attendance: 1,785
Referee: Ko Hyung-jin (South Korea)

29 October 2020
19:35 UTC+8

Jiangsu Suning	1–1	Shanghai SIPG
Teixeira 54'	CSL Report	Zhang Cheng 80' (o.g.)

Suzhou Olympic Sports Centre, Suzhou
Attendance: 2,859
Referee: Kim Hee-gon (South Korea)

==== Second leg (Round 18) ====
2 November 2020
19:35 UTC+8

Guangzhou Evergrande Taobao	3–1	Beijing Sinobo Guoan
Talisca 38' (pen.); Paulinho 55', 80'	CSL Report	Zhang Yuning 60'

Suzhou Olympic Sports Centre, Suzhou
Attendance: 2,849
Referee: Kim Hee-gon (South Korea)

Guangzhou Evergrande Taobao won 3–1 on aggregate.

2 November 2020
15:30 UTC+8

Shanghai SIPG	1–2 (a.e.t.)	Jiangsu Suning
Yang Shiyuan 24'	CSL Report	Wu Xi 77'; Luo Jing 106'

Suzhou Sports Center, Suzhou
Attendance: 1,951
Referee: Guo Baolong

Jiangsu Suning won 3–2 on aggregate.

=== 5th–8th place playoffs ===
Team 1	Agg.	Team 2	1st leg	2nd leg
Hebei China Fortune	5–8	Shandong Luneng Taishan	2–2	3–6 (a.e.t.)
Shanghai Greenland Shenhua	3–3 (9–10 p)	Chongqing Dangdai Lifan	3–1	0–2 (a.e.t.)

==== First leg (Round 17) ====
26 October 2020
19:35 UTC+8

Hebei China Fortune	2–2	Shandong Luneng Taishan
Turay 14'; Ding Haifeng 27' (pen.)	CSL Report	Guedes 44' (pen.), 73' (pen.)

Kunshan Sports Centre Stadium, Kunshan
Attendance: 430
Referee: Ai Kun

27 October 2020
19:35 UTC+8

Shanghai Greenland Shenhua	3–1	Chongqing Dangdai Lifan
Bolaños 28', 57'; Yu Hanchao 89' (pen.)	CSL Report	Cirino 77'

Kunshan Sports Centre Stadium, Kunshan
Attendance: 510
Referee: Guo Baolong

==== Second leg (Round 18) ====
31 October 2020
19:35 UTC+8

Shandong Luneng Taishan	6–3 (a.e.t.)	Hebei China Fortune
Moisés 18'; Guedes 78', 97'; Duan Liuyu 100'; Pellè 102'; Guo Tianyu 114'	CSL Report	Turay 21', 71'; Liao Wei 107'

Kunshan Sports Centre Stadium, Kunshan
Attendance: 535
Referee: Shi Zhenlu

Shandong Luneng Taishan won 8–5 on aggregate.

1 November 2020
19:35 UTC+8

Chongqing Dangdai Lifan	2–0 (a.e.t.)	Shanghai Greenland Shenhua
Cirino 62'; Kardec 64'	CSL Report
Penalties
Kardec (penalty scored); Fernandinho (penalty scored); Yin Congyao (penalty scored); Cirino (penalty scored); Yuan Mincheng (penalty scored); Marcinho (penalty scored); Liu Le (penalty scored); Dong Honglin (penalty scored); Deng Xiaofei (penalty scored); Kardec (penalty scored)	10–9	(penalty scored) Bolaños; (penalty scored) Peng Xinli; (penalty scored) Yu Hanchao; (penalty scored) Bai Jiajun; (penalty scored) Zhu Baojie; (penalty scored) N'Doumbou; (penalty scored) Wen Jiabao; (penalty scored) Francis; (penalty scored) Ma Zhen; (penalty missed) Bolaños

Kunshan Sports Centre Stadium, Kunshan
Attendance: 676
Referee: Xing Qi

3–3 on aggregate. Chongqing Dangdai Lifan won 10–9 on penalties.

=== 7th–8th place playoffs ===
Team 1	Agg.	Team 2	1st leg	2nd leg
Shanghai Greenland Shenhua	5–1	Hebei China Fortune	4–1	1–0

==== First leg (Round 19) ====
6 November 2020
15:30 UTC+8

Shanghai Greenland Shenhua	4–1	Hebei China Fortune
Bolaños 1'; Pan Ximing 22' (o.g.); Peng Xinli 51'; Martínez 76' (pen.)	CSL Report	Goulart 3'

Kunshan Sports Centre Stadium, Kunshan
Attendance: 354
Referee: Zhang Lei

==== Second leg (Round 20) ====
10 November 2020
15:30 UTC+8

Hebei China Fortune	0–1	Shanghai Greenland Shenhua
	CSL Report	Peng Xinli 90' (pen.)

Suzhou Sports Center, Suzhou
Attendance: 460
Referee: Ai Kun

Shanghai Greenland Shenhua won 5–1 on aggregate.

=== 5th–6th place playoffs ===
Team 1	Agg.	Team 2	1st leg	2nd leg
Chongqing Dangdai Lifan	5–5 (3–4 p)	Shandong Luneng Taishan	4–3	1–2 (a.e.t.)

==== First leg (Round 19) ====
6 November 2020
15:30 UTC+8

Chongqing Dangdai Lifan	4–3	Shandong Luneng Taishan
Dong Honglin 46'; Cirino 67'; Fernandinho 69'; Marcinho 88'	CSL Report	Moisés 2'; Guedes 16'; Guo Tianyu 45'

Suzhou Olympic Sports Centre, Suzhou
Attendance: 465
Referee: Wang Jing

==== Second leg (Round 20) ====
10 November 2020
15:30 UTC+8

Shandong Luneng Taishan	2–1 (a.e.t.)	Chongqing Dangdai Lifan
Fellaini 21'; Wang Tong 31'	CSL Report	Fernandinho 36'
Penalties
Fellaini (penalty scored); Zheng Zheng (penalty scored); Liu Yang (penalty scored); Chen Kerui (penalty scored)	4–3	(penalty scored) Kardec; (penalty scored) Fernandinho; (penalty scored) Chen Jie; (penalty missed) Liu Le; (penalty missed) Yuan Mincheng

Kunshan Sports Centre Stadium, Kunshan
Attendance: 297
Referee: Xing Qi

5–5 on aggregate. Shandong Luneng Taishan won 4–3 on penalties.

=== 3rd–4th place playoffs ===
Team 1	Agg.	Team 2	1st leg	2nd leg
Shanghai SIPG	2–3	Beijing Sinobo Guoan	1–2	1–1

==== First leg (Round 19) ====
7 November 2020
19:35 UTC+8

Shanghai SIPG	1–2	Beijing Sinobo Guoan
Guo Quanbo 89' (o.g.)	CSL Report	Bakambu 25'; Chi Zhongguo 50'

Suzhou Sports Center, Suzhou
Attendance: 1,066
Referee: Ko Hyung-jin (South Korea)

==== Second leg (Round 20) ====
11 November 2020
19:35 UTC+8

Beijing Sinobo Guoan	1–1	Shanghai SIPG
Alan 30'	CSL Report	Lopes 46'

Suzhou Sports Center, Suzhou
Attendance: 1,085
Referee: Guo Baolong

Beijing Sinobo Guoan won 3–2 on aggregate.

Beijing Sinobo Guoan qualified for the 2021 AFC Champions League qualifying play-offs, and as Jiangsu Suning folded after the season, Shanghai SIPG also qualified.

=== Finals ===
Team 1	Agg.	Team 2	1st leg	2nd leg
Jiangsu Suning	2–1	Guangzhou Evergrande Taobao	0–0	2–1

==== First leg (Round 19) ====
8 November 2020
19:35 UTC+8

Jiangsu Suning	0–0	Guangzhou Evergrande Taobao
	CSL Report

Suzhou Olympic Sports Centre, Suzhou
Attendance: 6,673
Referee: Shi Zhenlu

==== Second leg (Round 20) ====
12 November 2020
19:35 UTC+8

Guangzhou Evergrande Taobao	1–2	Jiangsu Suning
Wei Shihao 60'	CSL Report	Éder 45'; Teixeira 47'

Suzhou Olympic Sports Centre, Suzhou
Attendance: 9,386
Referee: Ko Hyung-jin (South Korea)

Jiangsu Suning won 2–1 on aggregate.

== Relegation stage ==
=== Bracket ===
9th–16th place playoffs
Shenzhen	0	1	1
Tianjin TEDA	2	1	3
Shijiazhuang Ever Bright	2	0	2
Dalian Pro	1	2	3
Guangzhou R&F	0	2	2
Qingdao Huanghai	0	1	1
Wuhan Zall	0	1	1
Henan Jianye	1	1	2

9th–12th place playoffs
Tianjin TEDA	2	1	3
Dalian Pro	0	2	2
Guangzhou R&F	1	2	3
Henan Jianye	2	3	5

9th–10th place playoffs
Tianjin TEDA	0	1	1
Henan Jianye (a.e.t.)	0	2	2
11th–12th place playoffs
Dalian Pro	3	0	3
Guangzhou R&F (a.e.t.)	0	4	4

13th–16th place playoffs
Shenzhen	1	2	3
Shijiazhuang Ever Bright	0	2	2
Qingdao Huanghai (p)	1	2	3 (5)
Wuhan Zall	2	1	3 (4)

13th–14th place playoffs
Shenzhen	2	2	4
Qingdao Huanghai	0	1	1
15th–16th place playoffs
Shijiazhuang Ever Bright	0	1	1
Wuhan Zall	0	2	2

=== 9th–16th place playoffs ===
Team 1	Agg.	Team 2	1st leg	2nd leg
Tianjin TEDA	3–1	Shenzhen	2–0	1–1
Dalian Pro	3–2	Shijiazhuang Ever Bright	1–2	2–0
Henan Jianye	2–1	Wuhan Zall	1–0	1–1
Qingdao Huanghai	1–2	Guangzhou R&F	0–0	1–2

==== First leg (Round 15) ====
16 October 2020
15:30 UTC+8

Tianjin TEDA	2–0	Shenzhen
Acheampong 3', 50'	CSL Report

Jinzhou Stadium, Dalian
Attendance: 678
Referee: Ma Ning

17 October 2020
15:30 UTC+8

Dalian Pro	1–2	Shijiazhuang Ever Bright
Sun Guowen 10'	CSL Report	Sunzu 30'; Matheus 80'

Dalian Sports Center, Dalian
Attendance: 2,716
Referee: Li Haixin

18 October 2020
15:30 UTC+8

Henan Jianye	1–0	Wuhan Zall
Dourado 30'	CSL Report

Dalian Youth Football Training Base Main Stadium, Dalian
Attendance: 0
Referee: Ma Li

19 October 2020
15:30 UTC+8

Qingdao Huanghai	0–0	Guangzhou R&F
	CSL Report

Jinzhou Stadium, Dalian
Attendance: 120
Referee: Wang Di

==== Second leg (Round 16) ====
21 October 2020
15:30 UTC+8

Shenzhen	1–1	Tianjin TEDA
Mary 27'	CSL Report	Bastians 74'

Dalian Sports Center, Dalian
Attendance: 272
Referee: Wang Jing

Tianjin TEDA won 3–1 on aggregate.

22 October 2020
15:30 UTC+8

Shijiazhuang Ever Bright	0–2	Dalian Pro
	CSL Report	Lin Liangming 20'; Wang Yaopeng 44'

Jinzhou Stadium, Dalian
Attendance: 2,365
Referee: Wang Di

Dalian Pro won 3–2 on aggregate.

23 October 2020
15:30 UTC+8

Wuhan Zall	1–1	Henan Jianye
Martins 90+2'	CSL Report	Wang Shangyuan 24'

Dalian Sports Center, Dalian
Attendance: 529
Referee: Wang Zhe

Henan Jianye won 2–1 on aggregate.

24 October 2020
15:30 UTC+8

Guangzhou R&F	2–1	Qingdao Huanghai
Mierzejewski 71'; Živković 78'	CSL Report	Vuković 88'

Dalian Youth Football Training Base Main Stadium, Dalian
Attendance: 0
Referee: Ko Hyung-jin (South Korea)

Guangzhou R&F won 2–1 on aggregate.

=== 9th–12th place playoffs ===
Team 1	Agg.	Team 2	1st leg	2nd leg
Dalian Pro	2–3	Tianjin TEDA	0–2	2–1
Guangzhou R&F	3–5	Henan Jianye	1–2	2–3

==== First leg (Round 17) ====
26 October 2020
15:30 UTC+8

Dalian Pro	0–2	Tianjin TEDA
	CSL Report	Acheampong 11', 41'

Jinzhou Stadium, Dalian
Attendance: 413
Referee: Ma Li

27 October 2020
15:30 UTC+8

Guangzhou R&F	1–2	Henan Jianye
Mierzejewski 29'	CSL Report	Feng Boxuan 32'; Wang Shangyuan 69'

Dalian Youth Football Training Base Main Stadium, Dalian
Attendance: 0
Referee: Guan Xing

==== Second leg (Round 18) ====
31 October 2020
15:30 UTC+8

Tianjin TEDA	1–2	Dalian Pro
Song Yue 77'	CSL Report	Lin Liangming 19'; Boateng 43'

Dalian Sports Center, Dalian
Attendance: 1,207
Referee: Wang Zhe

Tianjin TEDA won 3–2 on aggregate.

1 November 2020
15:30 UTC+8

Henan Jianye	3–2	Guangzhou R&F
Bassogog 41' (pen.); Luo Xin 76'; Karanga 90+1'	CSL Report	Ye Chugui 11'; Tošić 68'

Dalian Youth Football Training Base Main Stadium, Dalian
Attendance: 0
Referee: Wang Di

Henan Jianye won 5–3 on aggregate.

=== 13th–16th place playoffs ===
Team 1	Agg.	Team 2	1st leg	2nd leg
Shenzhen	3–2	Shijiazhuang Ever Bright	1–0	2–2
Wuhan Zall	3–3 (4–5 p)	Qingdao Huanghai	2–1	1–2 (a.e.t.)

==== First leg (Round 17) ====
28 October 2020
15:30 UTC+8

Shenzhen	1–0	Shijiazhuang Ever Bright
Mary 90+1'	CSL Report

Dalian Sports Center, Dalian
Attendance: 200
Referee: Fu Ming

29 October 2020
15:30 UTC+8

Wuhan Zall	2–1	Qingdao Huanghai
Kouassi 7'; Carriço 57'	CSL Report	Alessandrini 72'

Jinzhou Stadium, Dalian
Attendance: 220
Referee: Li Haixin

==== Second leg (Round 18) ====
2 November 2020
15:30 UTC+8

Shijiazhuang Ever Bright	2–2	Shenzhen
Muriqui 45'; Matheus 56'	CSL Report	Preciado 29'; Yang Yun 79' (o.g.)

Jinzhou Stadium, Dalian
Attendance: 320
Referee: Ma Ning

Shenzhen won 3–2 on aggregate.

2 November 2020
15:30 UTC+8

Qingdao Huanghai	2–1 (a.e.t.)	Wuhan Zall
Alessandrini 29'; Zhu Jianrong 71'	CSL Report	Liu Yun 15'
Penalties
Vuković (penalty scored); Zhu Jianrong (penalty scored); Yao Jiangshan (penalty scored); Minala (penalty scored); Alessandrini (penalty scored)	5–4	(penalty missed) Yao Hanlin; (penalty scored) Carriço; (penalty scored) Cong Zhen; (penalty scored) Martins; (penalty scored) Han Pengfei

Dalian Youth Football Training Base Main Stadium, Dalian
Attendance: 0
Referee: Ko Hyung-jin (South Korea)

3–3 on aggregate. Qingdao Huanghai won 5–4 on penalties.

=== 15th–16th place playoffs ===
Team 1	Agg.	Team 2	1st leg	2nd leg
Wuhan Zall	2–1	Shijiazhuang Ever Bright	0–0	2–1

==== First leg (Round 19) ====
7 November 2020
15:30 UTC+8

Wuhan Zall	0–0	Shijiazhuang Ever Bright
	CSL Report

Jinzhou Stadium, Dalian
Attendance: 350
Referee: Ma Ning

==== Second leg (Round 20) ====
11 November 2020
15:30 UTC+8

Shijiazhuang Ever Bright	1–2	Wuhan Zall
Matheus 53'	CSL Report	Kouassi 14', 85'

Dalian Sports Center, Dalian
Attendance: 453
Referee: Kim Hee-gon (South Korea)

Wuhan Zall won 2–1 on aggregate.

Wuhan Zall qualified to the relegation play-offs. Shijiazhuang Ever Bright were to be directly relegated to the 2021 China League One, but were reprieved from relegation after Jiangsu Suning folded.

=== 13th–14th place playoffs ===
Team 1	Agg.	Team 2	1st leg	2nd leg
Qingdao Huanghai	1–4	Shenzhen	0–2	1–2

==== First leg (Round 19) ====
6 November 2020
15:30 UTC+8

Qingdao Huanghai	0–2	Shenzhen
	CSL Report	Preciado 6'; Wang Yongpo 54'

Dalian Youth Football Training Base Main Stadium, Dalian
Attendance: 0
Referee: Fu Ming

==== Second leg (Round 20) ====
10 November 2020
15:30 UTC+8

Shenzhen	2–1	Qingdao Huanghai
Mary 42'; Gao Lin 55'	CSL Report	Bari Mamatil 81'

Jinzhou Stadium, Dalian
Attendance: 100
Referee: Tang Shunqi

Shenzhen won 4–1 on aggregate.

=== 11th–12th place playoffs ===
Team 1	Agg.	Team 2	1st leg	2nd leg
Guangzhou R&F	4–3	Dalian Pro	0–3	4–0 (a.e.t.)

==== First leg (Round 19) ====
6 November 2020
15:30 UTC+8

Guangzhou R&F	0–3	Dalian Pro
	CSL Report	Larsson 48'; Wang Jinxian 57'; Boateng 73'

Dalian Sports Center, Dalian
Attendance: 489
Referee: Kim Hee-gon (South Korea)

==== Second leg (Round 20) ====
10 November 2020
15:30 UTC+8

Dalian Pro	0–4 (a.e.t.)	Guangzhou R&F
	CSL Report	Li Shuai 9' (o.g.); Tošić 72'; Chen Zhizhao 85', 93'

Dalian Youth Football Training Base Main Stadium, Dalian
Attendance: 0
Referee: Guan Xing

Guangzhou R&F won 4–3 on aggregate.

=== 9th–10th place playoffs ===
Team 1	Agg.	Team 2	1st leg	2nd leg
Henan Jianye	2–1	Tianjin TEDA	0–0	2–1 (a.e.t.)

==== First leg (Round 19) ====
6 November 2020
15:30 UTC+8

Henan Jianye	0–0	Tianjin TEDA
	CSL Report

Jinzhou Stadium, Dalian
Attendance: 78
Referee: Li Haixin

==== Second leg (Round 20) ====
10 November 2020
15:30 UTC+8

Tianjin TEDA	1–2 (a.e.t.)	Henan Jianye
Song Yue 113'	CSL Report	Dourado 100'; Ivo 104' (pen.)

Dalian Sports Center, Dalian
Attendance: 108
Referee: Wang Zhe

Henan Jianye won 2–1 on aggregate.

== Relegation play-offs ==
=== Overview ===
Team 1	Agg.	Team 2	1st leg	2nd leg
Zhejiang Energy Greentown	2–3	Wuhan Zall	2–2	0–1

=== Matches ===
==== First leg ====
18 November 2020
19:35 UTC+8

Zhejiang Energy Greentown	2–2	Wuhan Zall
Mushekwi 55'; Ndlovu 90+9' (pen.)		Li Hang 14'; Kouassi 45+5'

Suzhou Olympic Sports Centre, Suzhou
Referee: Kim Hee-gon (South Korea)

==== Second leg ====
22 November 2020
19:35 UTC+8

Wuhan Zall	1–0	Zhejiang Energy Greentown
Li Hang 30' (pen.)

Suzhou Olympic Sports Centre, Suzhou
Referee: Ko Hyung-jin (South Korea)

Wuhan Zall won 3–2 on aggregate and stayed in the Chinese Super League.

== Final ranking ==
Rank	Team	Qualification or relegation
1	Jiangsu Suning (C, D)	Folded after season
2	Guangzhou Evergrande Taobao	Qualification for AFC Champions League group stage
3	Beijing Sinobo Guoan	Qualification for AFC Champions League group stage
4	Shanghai SIPG	Qualification for AFC Champions League play-off round
5	Shandong Luneng Taishan	
6	Chongqing Dangdai Lifan	
7	Shanghai Greenland Shenhua	
8	Hebei China Fortune	
9	Henan Jianye	
10	Tianjin TEDA	
11	Guangzhou R&F	
12	Dalian Pro	
13	Shenzhen	
14	Qingdao Huanghai	
15	Wuhan Zall (O)	Qualification for relegation play-offs
16	Shijiazhuang Ever Bright ~~(R)~~	Reprieved from relegation after Jiangsu Suning folded

== Player statistics ==
=== Top scorers ===
Rank	Player	Club	Goals
1	(Democratic Republic of the Congo) Cédric Bakambu	Beijing Sinobo Guoan	14
2	(Brazil) Paulinho	Guangzhou Evergrande Taobao	12
3	(Brazil) Marcão	Hebei China Fortune	11
3	(Cameroon) John Mary	Shenzhen	11
5	(Brazil) Alex Teixeira	Jiangsu Suning	10
6	(Brazil) Alan Kardec	Chongqing Dangdai Lifan	9
6	(France) Romain Alessandrini	Qingdao Huanghai	9
6	(Italy) Éder	Jiangsu Suning	9
6	(Venezuela) Salomón Rondón	Dalian Pro	9
10	(Brazil) Henrique Dourado	Henan Jianye	8
10	(China) Wei Shihao	Guangzhou Evergrande Taobao	8
10	(Italy) Graziano Pellè	Shandong Luneng Taishan	8
10	(Ivory Coast) Jean Evrard Kouassi	Wuhan Zall	8
10	(Poland) Adrian Mierzejewski	Chongqing Dangdai Lifan / Guangzhou R&F	8

=== Top assists ===
As of 23 October 2020

Rank	Player	Club	Assists
1	(Brazil) Oscar	Shanghai SIPG	7
2	(Brazil) Matheus	Shijiazhuang Ever Bright	5
2	(Poland) Adrian Mierzejewski	Chongqing Dangdai Lifan	5
4	(China) Yang Liyu	Guangzhou Evergrande Taobao	4
4	(Democratic Republic of the Congo) Cédric Bakambu	Beijing Sinobo Guoan	4
4	(Sierra Leone) Mohamed Buya Turay	Hebei China Fortune	4
4	(Spain) Jonathan Viera	Beijing Sinobo Guoan	4
5	7 players		3

=== Hat-tricks ===
Player	For	Against	Result	Date	Ref
(Belgium) Marouane Fellaini	Shandong Luneng Taishan	Dalian Pro	2–3 (A)	26 July 2020	
(Croatia) Ivan Santini	Jiangsu Suning	Henan Jianye	5–2 (H)	30 August 2020	
(Democratic Republic of the Congo) Cédric Bakambu^{4}	Beijing Sinobo Guoan	Chongqing Dangdai Lifan	5–2 (H)	1 September 2020	
(Poland) Adrian Mierzejewski	Chongqing Dangdai Lifan	Shijiazhuang Ever Bright	4–1 (A)	25 September 2020	

== Awards ==
=== Players of the Round ===
The following players were named the Players of the Round.

Round	Player	Club
1	(Belgium) Marouane Fellaini	Shandong Luneng Taishan
2	(France) Romain Alessandrini	Qingdao Huanghai
3	(Brazil) Alan Kardec	Chongqing Dangdai Lifan
4	(Brazil) Alex Teixeira	Jiangsu Suning
5	(Colombia) Giovanni Moreno	Shanghai Greenland Shenhua
6	(Israel) Eran Zahavi	Guangzhou R&F
7	(China) Jin Jingdao	Shandong Luneng Taishan
8	(Democratic Republic of the Congo) Cédric Bakambu	Beijing Sinobo Guoan
9	(Venezuela) Salomón Rondón	Dalian Pro
10	(Poland) Adrian Mierzejewski	Chongqing Dangdai Lifan
11	(Brazil) Renato Augusto	Beijing Sinobo Guoan
12	(Spain) Jonathan Viera	Beijing Sinobo Guoan
13	(Poland) Adrian Mierzejewski	Chongqing Dangdai Lifan
14	(Brazil) Fernando	Beijing Sinobo Guoan
15	(China) Wei Shihao	Guangzhou Evergrande Taobao
16	(China) Zhang Yuning	Beijing Sinobo Guoan
17	(Ghana) Frank Acheampong	Tianjin TEDA
18	(Brazil) Paulinho	Guangzhou Evergrande Taobao
19	(Sweden) Sam Larsson	Dalian Pro
20	(Brazil) Alex Teixeira	Jiangsu Suning

== League attendances ==
Round	Home team	Result	Away team	Date	Location	Attendance
6	Beijing Sinobo Guoan	1–2	Shanghai SIPG	22 August 2020	Suzhou	1,588
8	Shanghai SIPG	4–1	Tianjin TEDA	31 August 2020	Suzhou	835
8	Beijing Sinobo Guoan	5–2	Chongqing Dangdai Lifan	1 September 2020	Suzhou	742
9	Guangzhou Evergrande Taobao	2–1	Guangzhou R&F	4 September 2020	Dalian	1,500
9	Qingdao Huanghai	0–1	Shijiazhuang Ever Bright	5 September 2020	Suzhou	762
9	Wuhan Zall	2–2	Beijing Sinobo Guoan	6 September 2020	Suzhou	985
10	Shanghai Greenland Shenhua	1–1	Shandong Luneng Taishan	9 September 2020	Dalian	2,000
10	Shanghai SIPG	2–1	Qingdao Huanghai	10 September 2020	Suzhou	632
10	Chongqing Dangdai Lifan	3–1	Hebei China Fortune	11 September 2020	Suzhou	447
11	Shandong Luneng Taishan	1–2	Guangzhou Evergrande Taobao	13 September 2020	Dalian	2,000
11	Wuhan Zall	1–2	Shanghai SIPG	15 September 2020	Suzhou	871
11	Tianjin TEDA	1–1	Shijiazhuang Ever Bright	16 September 2020	Suzhou	452
12	Guangzhou Evergrande Taobao	2–1	Henan Jianye	21 September 2020	Dalian	600
12	Chongqing Dangdai Lifan	1–0	Wuhan Zall	22 September 2020	Suzhou	419
13	Dalian Pro	1–3	Shenzhen	24 September 2020	Dalian	5,894
13	Shanghai SIPG	1–0	Beijing Sinobo Guoan	25 September 2020	Suzhou	1,603
14	Guangzhou Evergrande Taobao	1–0	Dalian Pro	27 September 2020	Dalian	1,991
14	Shenzhen	0–1	Jiangsu Suning	27 September 2020	Dalian	2,000
14	Hebei China Fortune	3–1	Qingdao Huanghai	28 September 2020	Suzhou	224
