= Zhao Heng (footballer) =

Chinese association football player

Personal information
- Date of birth: 24 January 1997 (age 29)
- Height: 1.86 m (6 ft 1 in)
- Position: Goalkeeper

Team information
- Current team: Fuzhou Hengxing

Youth career
- –2018: Sichuan Jiuniu

Senior career*
| Years | Team | Apps | (Gls) |
| 2018–2021 | Sichuan Jiuniu | 41 | (0) |
| 2022- | Fuzhou Hengxing | 0 | (0) |
- * Club domestic league appearances and goals as of 14:01, 17 May 2022 (UTC)

Zhao Heng (Chinese: 赵恒; born 24 January 1997) is a Chinese footballer who plays as a goalkeeper for Chinese club Fuzhou Hengxing.

== Career statistics ==
=== Club ===
As of 27 July 2021.

| Club | Season | League | | | Cup | | Continental | | Other | | Total | |
| Club | Season | Division | Apps | Goals | Apps | Goals | Apps | Goals | Apps | Goals | Apps | Goals |
|---|---|---|---|---|---|---|---|---|---|---|---|---|
| Sichuan Jiuniu | 2018 | China League Two | 6 | 0 | 4 (Note: Appearances in the Chinese FA Cup) | 0 | – | | 2 (Note: Appearances in the China League Two playoffs) | 0 | 12 | 0 |
| Sichuan Jiuniu | 2019 | China League Two | 20 | 0 | 3 | 0 | – | | 2 | 0 | 25 | 0 |
| Sichuan Jiuniu | 2020 | China League One | 11 | 0 | 0 | 0 | – | | 0 | 0 | 11 | 0 |
| Sichuan Jiuniu | 2021 | China League One | 0 | 0 | 0 | 0 | – | | 0 | 0 | 0 | 0 |
| Career total | | | 37 | 0 | 7 | 0 | 0 | 0 | 4 | 0 | 48 | 0 |
