= Ricardo Matos (footballer, born 1979) =

Portuguese footballer

Personal information
- Full name: Ricardo Filipe Rodrigues Matos
- Date of birth: 15 February 1979 (age 47)
- Place of birth: Santo Ildefonso, Portugal
- Height: 1.91 m (6 ft 3 in)
- Position: Goalkeeper

Youth career
- 1987–1990: Boavista
- 1990–1997: Senhora da Hora

Senior career*
Years	Team	Apps	(Gls)
1997–1998	Senhora da Hora		
1998–1999	União Montemor	0	(0)
1999–2000	Sandinenses	3	(0)
2000–2001	Limianos		
2001–2002	Serzedelo		
2002–2004	Rio Tinto		
2004–2007	Tirsense		
2007–2008	Famalicão		
2008	Ribeirão	19	(0)
2008–2009	Varzim	7	(0)
2009–2012	Vitória Setúbal	2	(0)
2012–2013	Leixões	1	(0)
2013–2014	Porto B	0	(0)
- * Club domestic league appearances and goals

Ricardo Filipe Rodrigues Matos (born 15 February 1979) is a Portuguese retired footballer who played as a goalkeeper.

== Club career ==
Born in Santo Ildefonso (Porto), Matos competed in the Portuguese fourth division for the better part of his career, having two spells in the third: in the 1999–2000 season he played with G.D.R.C. Os Sandinenses, representing G.D. Ribeirão in 2007–08.

In the 2008–09 campaign, Matos was second-choice at Varzim S.C. in the Segunda Liga. In the following summer, aged already 30, he signed for Primeira Liga side Vitória F.C. along with nine other players, despite the club's precarious financial situation.

Matos acted as backup in his first season in Setúbal, making his first official appearance on 8 May 2010 in a 1–2 home defeat against already relegated C.F. Os Belenenses. Vitória narrowly managed to avoid the drop.
