= Wang Jinxian =

Chinese footballer (born 1996)

Wang Jinxian 汪晋贤
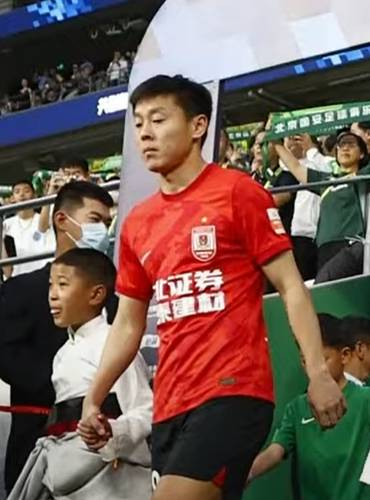
- Wang Jinxian in June 2023

Personal information
- Full name: Wang Jinxian
- Date of birth: 12 January 1996 (age 30)
- Place of birth: Wuhan, Hubei, China
- Height: 1.76 m (5 ft 9 1/2 in)
- Position: Midfielder

Team information
- Current team: Wuhan Three Towns
- Number: 8

Youth career
- 2005–2012: Dalian Yiteng
- 2012–2013: Dalian Aerbin

Senior career*
Years	Team	Apps	(Gls)
2013	→ Liaoning Youth (loan)	4	(1)
2014–2021	Dalian Pro	146	(7)
2022–2024	Changchun Yatai	74	(6)
2025–	Wuhan Three Towns	49	(3)

International career^{‡}
2012–2014	China U-16	8	(2)
2013–2014	China U-19	12	(4)
2016–2017	China U-23	14	(1)
2017–	China	2	(0)
- * Club domestic league appearances and goals as of 22 November 2026 ‡ National team caps and goals as of 14 January 2017

Wang Jinxian
- Simplified Chinese: 汪晋贤
- Traditional Chinese: 汪晉賢
Transcriptions
Standard Mandarin
- Hanyu Pinyin: Wāng Jìnxián
- IPA: [wáŋ tɕîn ɕjɛ̌n]

Wang Jinxian (Chinese: 汪晋贤; pinyin: Wāng Jìnxián; born 12 January 1996) is a Chinese professional footballer who currently plays as a midfielder for Chinese Super League club Wuhan Three Towns.

== Club career ==
=== Dalian Professional ===
Wang Jinxian started his football career when he was joined Dalian Yiteng's youth academy in 2005. He transferred to Chinese Super League side Dalian Aerbin (later renamed as Dalian Professional) in March 2012 when Dalian Aerbin bought the U17 team of Dalian Yiteng. He was then loaned to China League Two side Liaoning Youth during the 2013 season. In 2014, Wang returned to Dalian and was promoted to the club's first team squad. He made his debut for the club on 9 August 2014 in a 1-1 draw against Changchun Yatai, coming on as a substitute for Bruno Meneghel in the 86th minute. Unfortunately at the end of the 2014 Chinese Super League campaign he would be part of the squad that was relegated at the end of the season.

Wang would remain with Dalian and go on to become a regular within the team as well as going on to score his first goal for the club on 16 May 2015 in a 3-1 win against Shenzhen FC. In the following season he would be an integral member of the team that was pushing for promotion, however this ambition was derailed on 27 August 2016 in a 4-0 defeat to Wuhan Zall and Wang received a six match ban for violent conduct for his behaviour after the game. In the next campaign he would be an integral member of the team that won the division title and promotion to the top tier at the end of the 2017 China League One campaign.

=== Changchun Yatai ===
On 8 April 2022, Wang joined fellow top tier club Changchun Yatai on a free transfer. He made his debut in a league game on 4 June 2022 against Guangzhou City in a 4-1 victory. After going on to establish himself as an integral member of the team he scored his first two goals for the club in a league match on 19 August 2022 in a 7-1 victory against Hebei FC.

=== Wuhan Three Towns ===
On 24 January 2025, Wang joined Chinese Super League club Wuhan Three Towns.

== International career ==
Wang made his debut for the Chinese national team on 10 January 2017 in a 2-0 loss against Iceland in the 2017 China Cup, coming on as a substitute for Hui Jiakang in the 72nd minute.

== Career statistics ==
=== Club statistics ===
As of 18 July 2026.

Appearances and goals by club, season and competition
Club	Season	League			National Cup		Continental		Other		Total	
Club	Season	Division	Apps	Goals	Apps	Goals	Apps	Goals	Apps	Goals	Apps	Goals
Liaoning Youth (Loan)	2013	China League Two	4	1	-		-		-		4	1
Dalian Aerbin/ Dalian Yifang/ Dalian Professional	2014	Chinese Super League	6	0	1	0	-		-		7	0
Dalian Aerbin/ Dalian Yifang/ Dalian Professional	2015	China League One	25	2	2	0	-		-		27	2
Dalian Aerbin/ Dalian Yifang/ Dalian Professional	2016	China League One	23	1	1	0	-		-		24	1
Dalian Aerbin/ Dalian Yifang/ Dalian Professional	2017	China League One	29	2	0	0	-		-		29	2
Dalian Aerbin/ Dalian Yifang/ Dalian Professional	2018	Chinese Super League	20	2	2	0	-		-		22	2
Dalian Aerbin/ Dalian Yifang/ Dalian Professional	2019	Chinese Super League	28	0	4	0	-		-		32	0
Dalian Aerbin/ Dalian Yifang/ Dalian Professional	2020	Chinese Super League	9	0	1	0	-		-		10	0
Dalian Aerbin/ Dalian Yifang/ Dalian Professional	2021	Chinese Super League	6	0	4	1	-		2 (Note: Appearance(s) in Promotion/Relegation Play-offs)	0	10	1
Dalian Aerbin/ Dalian Yifang/ Dalian Professional	Total		146	7	15	1	0	0	2	0	163	8
Changchun Yatai	2022	Chinese Super League	24	3	0	0	-		-		24	3
Changchun Yatai	2023	Chinese Super League	29	2	1	0	-		-		30	2
Changchun Yatai	2024	Chinese Super League	21	1	1	0	-		-		22	1
Changchun Yatai	Total		74	6	2	0	0	0	0	0	76	6
Wuhan Three Towns	2025	Chinese Super League	24	1	0	0	-		-		24	1
Wuhan Three Towns	2026	Chinese Super League	14	2	1	0	-		-		15	2
Wuhan Three Towns	Total		38	3	1	0	0	0	0	0	39	3
Career total			262	17	18	1	0	0	2	0	282	18

=== International statistics ===
National team
Year	Apps	Goals
2017	2	0
Total	2	0

== Honours ==
=== Club ===
Dalian Professional

- China League One: 2017.
