= Sun Guowen =

Chinese footballer

Sun Guowen 孙国文
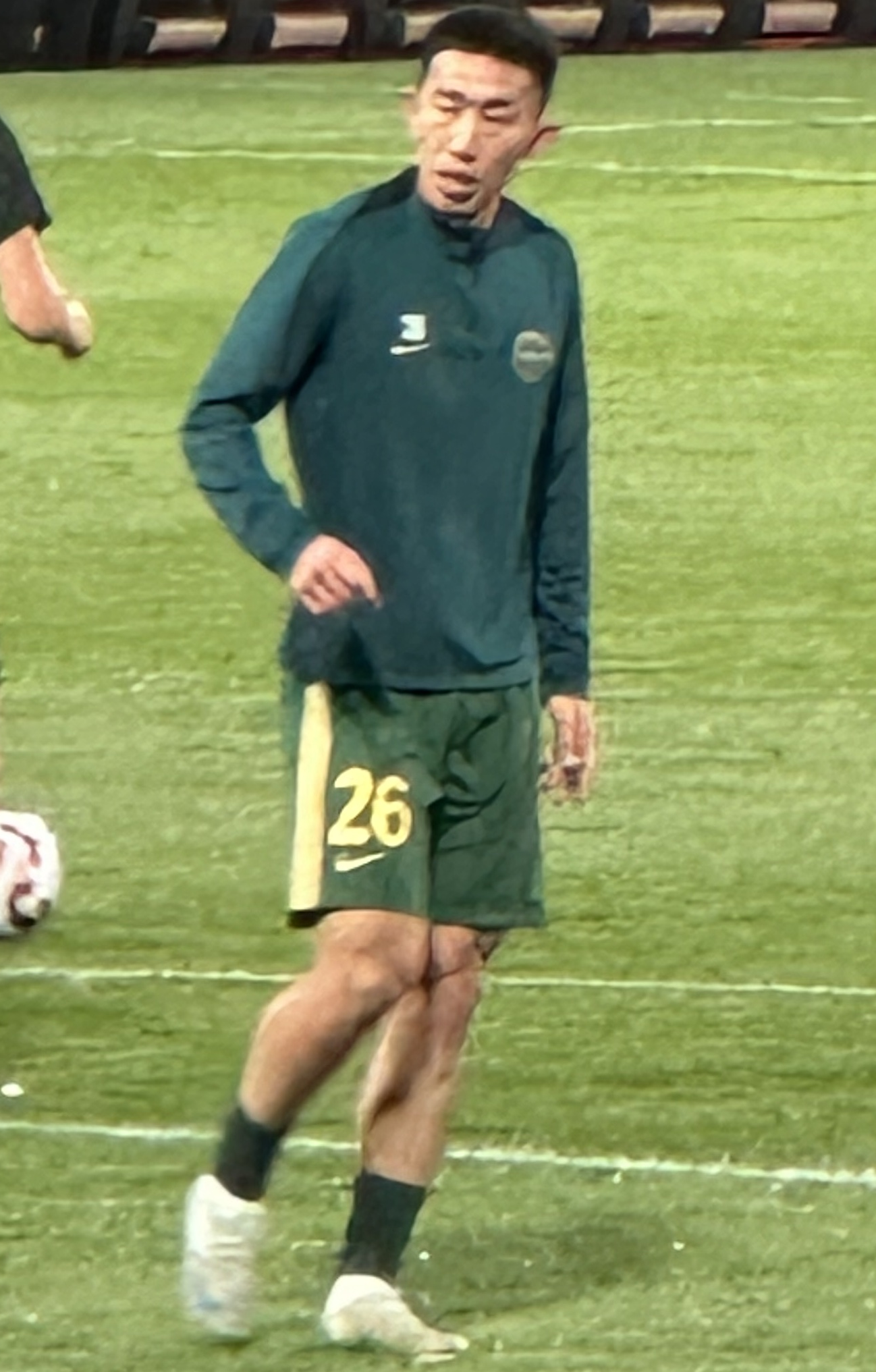
- Sun Guowen in April 2025

Personal information
- Date of birth: 30 September 1993 (age 33)
- Place of birth: Dalian, Liaoning, China
- Height: 1.80 m (5 ft 11 in)
- Positions: Winger; full-back

Team information
- Current team: Zhejiang FC
- Number: 26

Youth career
- 2006–2010: Dalian Shide

Senior career*
Years	Team	Apps	(Gls)
2011–2012	Dalian Shide	5	(0)
2013–2015	Dalian Aerbin	29	(6)
2017–2022	Dalian Professional	108	(4)
2023–2024	Shandong Taishan	17	(1)
2024	→ Zhejiang FC (loan)	23	(3)
2025–	Zhejiang FC	58	(0)

International career^{‡}
2023–	China	4	(0)
- * Club domestic league appearances and goals as of 19 November 2026 ‡ National team caps and goals as of 20 June 2023

Sun Guowen (Chinese: 孙国文; pinyin: Sūn Guówén; born 30 September 1993 in Dalian, Liaoning) is a Chinese footballer who currently plays as winger or full-back for Chinese Super League club Zhejiang FC and the China national team.

== Club career ==
Sun started his professional football career in 2011 when he was promoted to Chinese Super League side Dalian Shide. On 6 May 2012, he made his senior debut for Dalian in a 4–1 home victory against Tianjin Teda, coming on as a substitute for James Chamanga in the 87th minute. He made 5 CSL appearances in the 2012 league season.

In 2013, Sun transferred to Dalian Aerbin after Dalian Shide dissolved. On 21 May 2013, he made his debut for Dalian Aerbin in the third round of 2013 Chinese FA Cup, coming on as a substitute for Zhou Tong in the 86th minute.

Sun left Dalian after scoring six goals in 19 appearances in the 2015 China League One season, claiming that his contract with the club had ended. Dalian appealed for an arbitration in January 2016, and sued the court in March 2016. Sun lost the lawsuit on 10 August 2016. He returned to the renamed Dalian Yifang (now Dalian Professional) in December 2016.

Sun scored one goal in 28 appearances as Dalian won the 2017 China League One championship and earned promotion back to the Chinese Super League ahead of the 2018 season.

== International career ==
On 26 March 2023, Sun made his international debut in a 2-1 away defeat against New Zealand, and provided an injury time assist for Ba Dun.

== Career statistics ==
Statistics accurate as of match played 31 December 2022.

Appearances and goals by club, season and competition
Club	Season	League			National Cup		Continental		Other		Total	
Club	Season	Division	Apps	Goals	Apps	Goals	Apps	Goals	Apps	Goals	Apps	Goals
Dalian Shide	2011	Chinese Super League	0	0	0	0	-		-		0	0
Dalian Shide	2012	Chinese Super League	5	0	0	0	-		-		5	0
Dalian Shide	Total		5	0	0	0	0	0	0	0	5	0
Dalian Aerbin	2013	Chinese Super League	0	0	1	0	-		-		1	0
Dalian Aerbin	2014	Chinese Super League	10	0	0	0	-		-		10	0
Dalian Aerbin	2015	China League One	19	6	2	0	-		-		21	6
Dalian Aerbin	Total		29	6	3	0	0	0	0	0	32	6
Dalian Professional	2017	China League One	28	1	1	0	-		-		29	1
Dalian Professional	2018	Chinese Super League	7	0	4	1	-		-		11	1
Dalian Professional	2019	Chinese Super League	8	0	2	0	-		-		10	0
Dalian Professional	2020	Chinese Super League	19	1	0	0	-		-		18	1
Dalian Professional	2021	Chinese Super League	20	0	3	0	-		1 (Note: Appearance(s) in Promotion/Relegation Play-offs)	1	24	1
Dalian Professional	2022	Chinese Super League	26	2	1	0	-		-		27	2
Dalian Professional	Total		108	4	11	1	0	0	1	1	120	6
Career total			142	10	14	1	0	0	1	1	157	12

== Honours ==
Dalian Professional

- China League One: 2017
