= 2009 in Chinese football =

== Overview ==
=== Domestic champions ===
Competition	Winners
Chinese Super League 2009	Beijing Guoan
China League One 2009	Liaoning Whowin
China League Two 2009	Hunan Billows
11th National Games	Shanghai Team
11th National Games (Women's)	Liaoning Team
China Women's Super League 2009	Jiangsu Huatai
China Women's FA Cup 2009	
Chinese Reserve League 2009	
Chinese U–19 League 2009	
Chinese U–17 League 2009	
Chinese U–15 League 2009	
China Futsal League 2008–09	Wuhan Dilong
China University League 2008–09	Three Gorges University

=== International results ===
Competition	Result
AFC Champions League 2009 – Group E	4th place (eliminated), Beijing Guoan
AFC Champions League 2009 – Group F	3rd place (eliminated), Shandong Luneng
AFC Champions League 2009 – Group G	3rd place (eliminated), Shanghai Shenhua
AFC Champions League 2009 – Group H	3rd place (eliminated), Tianjin Teda
Pan-Pacific Championship 2009	4th place, Shandong Luneng
AFC Futsal Club Championship 2009	
2011 AFC Asian Cup qualification	
Algarve Cup 2009	5th place
2009 Four Nations Tournament	Winners
AFC U-19 Championship 2010 qualification	
2009 East Asian Games	
AFC U-16 Championship 2010 qualification	
2009 Asian Youth Games	
AFC U-19 Women's Championship 2009	
AFC U-16 Women's Championship 2009	
2009 Asian Indoor Games	
EAFF Futsal Championship 2009	
2009 AFC Beach Soccer Championship	

== Domestic competitions ==
=== 2009 Chinese Super League ===
Pos	Team	Pld	W	D	L	GF	GA	GD	Pts	Qualification or relegation
1	Beijing Guoan (C)	30	13	12	5	48	28	+20	51	AFC Champions League 2010 Group stage
2	Changchun Yatai	30	14	8	8	38	31	+7	50	AFC Champions League 2010 Group stage
3	Henan Construction	30	13	9	8	35	26	+9	48	AFC Champions League 2010 Group stage
4	Shandong Luneng	30	11	12	7	35	30	+5	45 (Note: Shandong: 9 pts, 7–4; Shanghai: 7 pts, 9–3; Tianjin: 1 pt, 1–10)	AFC Champions League 2010 Group stage
5	Shanghai Shenhua	30	12	9	9	39	29	+10	45	
6	Tianjin TEDA	30	12	9	9	36	29	+7	45	
7	Chengdu Blades (R)	30	11	6	13	32	39	−7	39 (Note: Chengdu Blades were relegated after being found guilty of match-fixing on February 23, 2010.)	Relegation to China League One
8	Dalian Shide	30	10	8	12	27	31	−4	38	
9	Guangzhou GPC (R)	30	9	10	11	38	38	0	37 (Note: Guangzhou: 10 pts, 12–10; Jiangsu: 8 pts, 6–7; Shenzhen: 8 pts, 8–10; Shaanxi: 6 pts, 9–8. Guangzhou were relegated after being found guilty of match-fixing on February 23, 2010.)	Relegation to China League One
10	Jiangsu Sainty	30	9	10	11	30	30	0	37 (Note: Guangzhou: 10 pts, 12–10; Jiangsu: 8 pts, 6–7; Shenzhen: 8 pts, 8–10; Shaanxi: 6 pts, 9–8)	
11	Shenzhen Asia Travel	30	10	10	10	36	40	−4	37 (Note: Guangzhou: 10 pts, 12–10; Jiangsu: 8 pts, 6–7; Shenzhen: 8 pts, 8–10; Shaanxi: 6 pts, 9–8. Shenzhen were docked 3 points for wearing the wrong kits for a home match against Shanghai and causing a one-hour delay of the match on 30 Aug 2009.)	
12	Shaanxi Chan-Ba	30	9	10	11	26	24	+2	37	
13	Qingdao Jonoon	30	8	12	10	36	36	0	36	
14	Changsha Ginde	30	6	15	9	23	31	−8	33	
15	Hangzhou Greentown	30	8	8	14	30	43	−13	32	
16	Chongqing Lifan	30	7	8	15	27	51	−24	29	

Source: 2009 league table on the official site of the Chinese Super League
Rules for classification: 1st points; 2nd head-to-head points; 3rd head-to-head goal difference; 4th head-to-head goals scored; 5th goal difference; 6th goals scored; 7th disciplinary points (1 point for each yellow card, 3 points for each red card). Head-to-Head: used when head-to-head record is used to rank tied teams.
(C) Champions; (R) Relegated

=== 2009 China League One ===
Pos	Team	Pld	W	D	L	GF	GA	GD	Pts	Promotion or relegation
1	Liaoning Whowin (C, P)	24	18	3	3	49	17	+32	57	Promotion to Chinese Super League
2	Nanchang Bayi Hengyuan (P)	24	14	5	5	48	22	+26	47	Promotion to Chinese Super League
3	Shenyang Dongjin	24	12	8	4	39	21	+18	44 (Note: Shenyang: 4 pts, 3–2; Shanghai: 1 pt, 2–3)	
4	Shanghai East Asia	24	13	5	6	43	25	+18	44	
5	Guangdong Sunray Cave	24	10	5	9	37	37	0	35	
6	Yanbian	24	7	8	9	29	30	−1	29 (Note: Yanbian: 6 pts, 5–1; Anhui: 0 pts, 1–5)	
7	Anhui Jiufang	24	7	8	9	35	44	−9	29	
8	Beijing BIT	24	7	7	10	29	33	−4	28	
9	Shanghai Zobon	24	7	6	11	23	35	−12	27	
10	Qingdao Hailifeng	24	7	5	12	38	45	−7	26	Disbanded after season
11	Beijing Hongdeng	24	5	7	12	26	36	−10	22	Disbanded after season
12	Nanjing Yoyo	24	5	9	10	23	40	−17	18 (Note: Nanjing Yoyo were docked 6 points for debt dispute and breaking the FIFA regulations in the payment of foreign players)	
13	Sichuan (R)	24	4	4	16	26	60	−34	16	Relegation to China League Two

Updated to match(es) played on 25 Oct 2009. Source: 2009 China League One table
Rules for classification: 1st points; 2nd head-to-head points; 3rd head-to-head goal difference; 4th head-to-head goals scored; 5th goal difference; 6th goals scored; 7th disciplinary points (1 point for each yellow card, 3 points for each red card).
(C) Champions; (P) Promoted; (R) Relegated

=== 2009 China League Two ===
==== South Division ====
Pos	Team	Pld	W	D	L	GF	GA	GD	Pts	Qualification
1	Hubei Luyin (Q, P)	10	7	3	0	15	1	+14	24	Play-off semi-finals
2	Hunan Billows (Q, C, P)	10	3	6	1	12	5	+7	15	Play-off first round
3	Hubei CTGU Kangtian (Q)	10	4	3	3	5	8	−3	15	Play-off first round
4	Guizhou Zhicheng (Q)	10	3	5	2	9	4	+5	14	Play-off first round
5	Wenzhou Tomorrow	10	3	1	6	9	17	−8	10	
6	Ningbo Huaao	10	0	2	8	3	18	−15	2	

==== North Division ====
Pos	Team	Pld	W	D	L	GF	GA	GD	Pts	Qualification
1	Beijing Baxy&Shengshi (Q)	12	6	3	3	17	12	+5	21	Play-off semi-finals
2	Hangzhou Sanchao (Q)	12	5	5	2	11	8	+3	20	Play-off first round
3	Tianjin Songjiang (Q)	12	4	6	2	17	11	+6	18	Play-off first round
4	Tianjin Huochetou (Q)	12	4	4	4	11	14	-3	16	Play-off first round
5	Yantai Yiteng	12	4	2	6	17	15	+2	14	
6	Panjin Mengzun	12	4	1	7	10	19	−9	13	
7	Qingdao QUST	12	2	5	5	6	10	−4	11	

==== Play-offs ====
===== First round =====
Team 1	Agg.	Team 2	1st leg	2nd leg
Hangzhou Sanchao	3–3(a)	Hubei CTGU Kangtian	0–2	3–1
Hohai University	3–7	Yanbian University	2–4	1–3
Tianjin Songjiang	1–4	Guizhou Zhicheng	1–1	0–3
Tianjin Huochetou	3–4	Hunan Billows	0–1	3–3

===== Second round =====
Team 1	Agg.	Team 2	1st leg	2nd leg
Hangzhou Sanchao	3–2	Guizhou Zhicheng	2–2	1–0
Yanbian University	1–5	Hunan Billows	0–4	1–1

===== Semi-finals / Promotion finals =====
Team 1	Agg.	Team 2	1st leg	2nd leg
Beijing Baxy&Shengshi	7–8	Hunan Billows	4–3	3–5
Hangzhou Sanchao	0–1	Hubei Luyin	0–0	0–1

===== Third place match =====
2009-11-28
9:30

Beijing Baxy&Shengshi	4–2	Hangzhou Sanchao

2nd Field, Xingyao Stadium, Kunming

===== Champions final =====
2009-11-28
9:30

Hunan Billows	1–1	Hubei Luyin
Akram 68'	Report	Mei Fang 14'
Penalties
Akram (penalty scored); Yang Baoming (penalty scored); Hu Hao (penalty scored); Zhang Pengnan (penalty scored)	4–2	(penalty missed) Mei Fang; (penalty scored) Ke Zhao; (penalty scored) Kong Linglong; (penalty missed) Wang Wenhua

Xingyao Stadium, Kunming
Referee: Zhao Liang

=== Football at the 11th National Games of China ===
Matches will be held in Shandong, men's u20 competition will be held from 22 July to 1 August and u16, women's and women's u18 are scheduled to be played from 12 to 22 October.

=== China Women's FA Cup 2009 ===
First round

Team 1	Agg.	Team 2	1st leg	2nd leg
Tianjin Huisen	3–2	Hubei Jianghan	1–0	2 – 2
Sichuan Jiannanchun	–	Henan Thirteen-Spice	2–1	–
Hebei Yuandong	1 – 1 (P8–9)	Shandong Sinotruk	1–0	0 – 1
Guangdong Highsun	–	Jilin Huaxin	–	–

=== Chinese U–19 League 2009 ===
Updated to games played on 15 April 2009

Weifang Group

P	Team	Pld	W	D	L	GF	GA	GD	Pts
1	Shandong Luneng U19s	3	3	0	0	7	3	+4	9
2	Tianjin Teda U19s	3	3	0	0	10	4	+6	9
3	Guangzhou GPC U19s	3	1	1	1	2	4	−2	4
4	Beijing Guoan U19s	3	1	1	1	2	3	−1	4
5	Shandong U19s	3	1	0	2	6	7	−1	3
6	Yanbian U19s	4	1	0	3	4	4	0	3
7	Qingdao Jonoon U19s	3	0	0	3	3	9	−6	0
–	Changsha Ginde U19s	0	0	0	0	0	0	0	0

Yichang Group

P	Team	Pld	W	D	L	GF	GA	GD	Pts
1	Changchun Yatai U19s	5	5	0	0	16	1	+15	15
2	Jiangsu Sainty U19s	5	4	0	1	12	6	+6	12
3	Hubei U19s	5	3	0	2	8	7	+1	9
4	Chongqing Lifan U19s	5	2	0	3	9	14	−5	6
5	Henan Construction U19s	5	1	1	3	4	6	−2	4
6	Qingdao Hailifeng U19s	5	1	1	3	3	7	−4	4
7	Hangzhou Greentown U19s	5	1	1	3	4	9	−5	4
8	Tanggu Haide U19s	5	1	1	3	6	12	−6	4

=== China Futsal League 2008–09 ===
P	Team	Pld	W	D	L	GF	GA	GD	Pts	Qualification
1	Wuhan Dilong–Hubei Univ. (C)	56	50	5	1	357	125	+232	155	AFC Futsal Club Championship 2010
2	Shanghai Xufang–Donghua Univ.	56	36	5	15	239	174	+65	113	
3	Guangzhou Sport Univ.–ACT	56	33	4	19	215	172	+43	103	
4	Dalian Junyue–DUFE	56	26	4	26	234	237	−3	82	
5	Beijing Univ. of Technology	56	26	3	27	205	212	−7	81	
6	Chengdu UESTC	56	21	1	34	176	224	−48	64	
7	Hubei Three Gorges Univ.	56	8	7	41	149	269	−120	31	
9	Henan Construction	56	8	3	45	133	291	−158	27	

== International clubs competitions ==
=== AFC Champions League 2009 ===
==== Group E ====
Team	Pld	W	D	L	GF	GA	GD	Pts
(Japan) Nagoya Grampus	6	3	3	0	10	4	+6	12
(Australia) Newcastle United Jets	6	3	1	2	6	5	+1	10
(South Korea) Ulsan Hyundai	6	2	0	4	4	10	−6	6
(China) Beijing Guoan	6	1	2	3	4	5	−1	5

	(China)	(Japan)	(South Korea)	(Australia)
Beijing Guoan (China)		1–1	0–1	2–0
Nagoya Grampus (Japan)	0–0		4–1	1–1
Ulsan Hyundai (South Korea)	1–0	1–3		0–1
Newcastle Jets (Australia)	2–1	0–1	2–0	

==== Group F ====
Team	Pld	W	D	L	GF	GA	GD	Pts
(Japan) Gamba Osaka	6	5	0	1	17	4	+13	15
(South Korea) FC Seoul	6	3	1	2	14	11	+3	10
(China) Shandong Luneng	6	2	1	2	10	9	+1	7
(Indonesia) Sriwijaya FC	6	1	0	5	7	24	−17	3

	(China)	(Japan)	(South Korea)	(Indonesia)
Shandong Luneng (China)		0–1	2–0	5–0
Gamba Osaka (Japan)	3–0		1–2	5–0
FC Seoul (South Korea)	1–1	2–4		5–1
Sriwijaya FC (Indonesia)	4–2	0–3	2–4	

==== Group G ====
Team	Pld	W	D	L	GF	GA	GD	Pts
(Japan) Kashima Antlers	6	4	1	1	16	6	+10	13
(South Korea) Suwon Bluewings	6	4	0	2	12	8	+4	12
(China) Shanghai Shenhua	6	2	2	2	9	8	+1	8
Singapore Armed Forces	6	0	1	5	4	19	−15	1

	(China)	(Japan)	(South Korea)	(Singapore)
Shanghai Shenhua (China)		1–1	2–1	4–1
Kashima Antlers (Japan)	2–0		3–0	5–0
Suwon Bluewings (South Korea)	2–1	4–1		3–1
Armed Forces (Singapore)	1–1	1–4	0–2	

==== Group H ====
Team	Pld	W	D	L	GF	GA	GD	Pts
(South Korea) Pohang Steelers	6	3	3	0	7	3	+4	12
(Japan) Kawasaki Frontale	6	3	1	2	10	7	+3	10
(China) Tianjin Teda	6	2	2	2	6	5	+1	8
(Australia) Central Coast Mariners	6	0	2	4	5	13	−8	2

	(China)	(Japan)	(South Korea)	(Australia)
Tianjin Teda (China)		3–1	0–0	2–2
Kawasaki Frontale (Japan)	1–0		0–2	2–1
Pohang Steelers (South Korea)	1–0	1–1		3–2
CC Mariners (Australia)	0–1	0–5	0–0	

=== Pan-Pacific Championship 2009 ===
==== Semi-final ====
2009-02-18	Suwon Bluewings (South Korea)	1–0	(China) Shandong Luneng	(United States) Carson
17:30 GMT-8	Cho Yong-Tae 81'	Report		Stadium: Home Depot Center; Attendance: N/A; Referee: (United States) Baldomero Toledo

==== Third place final ====
2009-02-21	Oita Trinita (Japan)	2–1	(China) Shandong Luneng	(United States) Carson
17:30 GMT-8	Daiki Takamatsu 28'; Ueslei 42'	Report	Miljan Mrdaković 45' (pen.)	Stadium: Home Depot Center; Attendance: N/A; Referee: N/A

=== AFC Futsal Club Championship 2009 ===
Group B

Team	Pld	W	D	L	GF	GA	GD	Pts
(China) Wuhan Dilong	0	0	0	0	0	0	0	0
(Thailand) Thai Port	0	0	0	0	0	0	0	0
(Australia) New South Wales Thunder	0	0	0	0	0	0	0	0
(Qatar) Al-Sadd	0	0	0	0	0	0	0	0
(Lebanon) Pro's Café Beirut	0	0	0	0	0	0	0	0

The tournament which was scheduled to be held from 4 to 11 July has been postponed due to 2009 Iranian election protests. No new dates have been announced.

TBA	New South Wales Thunder (Australia)	v	(China) Wuhan Dilong	(Iran) Isfahan
16:30 GMT+4:30				Stadium: Pirouzi Stadium; Referee:

TBA	Pro's Café Beirut (Lebanon)	v	(China) Wuhan Dilong	(Iran) Isfahan
11:30 GMT+4:30				Stadium: Pirouzi Stadium; Referee:

TBA	Al-Sadd (Qatar)	v	(China) Wuhan Dilong	(Iran) Isfahan
11:30 GMT+4:30				Stadium: Pirouzi Stadium; Referee:

TBA	Thai Port (Thailand)	v	(China) Wuhan Dilong	(Iran) Isfahan
14:00 GMT+4:30				Stadium: Pirouzi Stadium; Referee:

== National teams competitions ==
=== Men's senior team ===
==== 2011 AFC Asian Cup qualification ====
Group D

Team	Pld	W	D	L	GF	GA	GD	Pts
Syria	2	2	0	0	5	2	+3	6
China	2	1	0	1	8	4	+4	3
Vietnam	2	1	0	1	4	7	−3	3
Lebanon	2	0	0	2	1	5	−4	0

	(China)	(Vietnam)	(Syria)	(Lebanon)
China		6–1	06 Jan	22 Nov
Vietnam	17 Jan		14 Nov	3–1
Syria	3–2	18 Nov		03 Mar
Lebanon	14 Nov	06 Jan	0–2	

2009-01-14	Syria	3–2	China	(Syria) Aleppo
14:00 GMT+2	Al Sayed 8' (pen.) 24'; Al Khatib 39' (pen.)	Report	Qu Bo 51'; Liu Jian 90+4'	Stadium: Aleppo International Stadium; Attendance: 7,000; Referee: (Iran) Mohsen Torky

2009-01-21	China	6–1	Vietnam	(China) Hangzhou
19:35 GMT+8	Gao Lin 2' 20' 84'; Du Wei 27'; Jiang Ning 37'; Hao Junmin 47'	Report	Nguyen Vu Phong 11'	Stadium: Yellow Dragon Sports Center; Attendance: 15,300; Referee: (South Korea) Kim Dong-Jin

2009-11-14	Lebanon	0–2	China	(Lebanon) Beirut
17:00 GMT+2				Stadium: Beirut Municipal Stadium; Referee:

2009-11-22	China	1–0	Lebanon	(China) Hangzhou
19:30 GMT+8				Stadium: Yellow Dragon Sports Center; Referee:

==== Friendly matches ====
2009-01-09	Iran	3–1	China	(Iran) Tehran
15:00 GMT+3:30	Arash Borhani 20'; Karim Bagheri 26'; Maziar Zare 70' (pen.)	Report	Huang Bowen 66'	Stadium: Azadi Stadium; Attendance: N/A; Referee: (Iran) Mohsen Torky

2009-05-29	China	1–1	Germany	(China) Shanghai
20:00 GMT+8	Hao Junmin 5'	Report	Lukas Podolski 7'	Stadium: Shanghai Stadium; Attendance: 25,000; Referee: (South Korea) Lee Min-Hu

2009-06-01	China	1–0	Iran	(China) Qinhuangdao
19:35 GMT+8	Gao Lin 44'	Report		Stadium: Qinhuangdao Olympic Center; Attendance: 23,000; Referee: (China) Fan Qi

2009-06-04	China	1–4	Saudi Arabia	(China) Tianjin
18:05 GMT+8	Jiang Ning 34'	Report	Yasser Al-Qahtani 7'; Mohammed Noor 44'; Naif Hazazi 74'; Nasser Al-Shamrani 88' (pen.)	Stadium: Tianjin Olympic Center Stadium; Attendance: 26,000; Referee: (China) Wan Daxue

2009-07-18	China	3–1	Palestine	(China) Tianjin
20:00 GMT+8	Qu Bo 11'; Gao Lin 48'; Yang Hao 59'	Report	Ahmed Keshkesh 90+1' (pen.)	Stadium: TEDA Football Stadium; Attendance: 10,000; Referee: (China) Fan Qi

2009-07-25	China	3–0	Kyrgyzstan	(China) Tianjin
19:35 GMT+8	Han Peng 17'; Hao Junmin 28'; Yu Hai 46'	Report		Stadium: TEDA Football Stadium; Attendance: 20,000; Referee: (China) Tao Ran

2009-08-12	Singapore	1–1	China	Singapore
19:30 GMT+8	Noh Alam Shah 7'	Report	Yang Hao 27'	Stadium: National Stadium; Referee: (South Korea) Koh Yung-Jin

2009-08-15	Malaysia	0–0	China	(Malaysia) Kuala Lumpur
17:30 GMT+8		Report		Stadium: Stadium Nasional Bukit Jalil; Referee:

2009-09-09	China	0–0	Senegal	(China) Harbin
GMT+8				Stadium: International Conference, Exhibition and Sports Center Stadium; Attendance: 21,384; Referee: (Hong Kong) Liu Kwok Man

2009-09-30	China	4–1	Botswana	(China) Hohhot
GMT+8				Stadium: Hohhot People's Stadium; Referee:

2009-11-08	Kuwait	2–2	China	Kuwait City
GMT+4				Referee:

2009-12-30	China	2–2	Jordan	(China) Yiwu
GMT+4	Zhang Linpeng 48'; Han Peng 56'		Shelbaieh 71', 78'	Stadium: Meihu Sports Centre; Referee:

=== Women's senior team ===
==== 2009 Algarve Cup ====
Group A

Team	Pld	W	D	L	GF	GA	GD	Pts
Sweden	3	2	1	0	4	2	+2	7
Germany	3	2	0	1	7	3	+4	6
China	3	1	1	1	1	3	−2	4
Finland	3	0	0	3	0	4	−4	0

2009-03-04	Sweden	0–0	China	(Portugal) Lagos
15:00 GMT		Report		Stadium: Estadio Municipal

2009-03-06	Germany	3–0	China	(Portugal) Albufeira
13:15 GMT	Kerstin Garefrekes 37' 67'; Kim Kulig 58'	Report		Stadium: Estadio Municipal

2009-03-09	Finland	0–1	China	(Portugal) Vila Real de Santo António
13:15 GMT		Report	Bi Yan 76'	Stadium: Estadio Municipal

Fifth place match

2009-03-11	Iceland	1–2	China	(Portugal) Olhão
11:30 GMT	Harpa Thorsteinsdóttir 45'	Report	Lou Jiahui 25'; Xu Yuan 75'	Stadium: Estádio José Arcanjo

==== 2009 Four Nations Tournament ====
Team	Pld	W	D	L	GF	GA	GD	Pts
China	3	3	0	0	8	0	+8	9
South Korea	3	2	0	1	8	4	+4	6
Finland	3	1	0	2	2	5	−3	3
New Zealand	3	0	0	3	3	12	−9	0

2009-01-10	China	6–0	New Zealand	(China) Guangzhou
20:05 GMT+8	Bi Yan 3'; Yuan Fan 28'; Xu Yuan 50' 66'; Han Duan 83' 90'	Report		Stadium: Yuexiushan Stadium

2009-01-12	China	1–0	Finland	(China) Guangzhou
19:35 GMT+8	Wang Dandan 41'	Report		Stadium: Yuexiushan Stadium

2009-01-14	China	1–0	South Korea	(China) Guangzhou
19:35 GMT+8	Bi Yan 35'	Report		Stadium: Yuexiushan Stadium

==== Women's 4 Nations Cup 2009 ====
Team	Pld	W	D	L	GF	GA	GD	Pts
China	3	3	0	0	11	2	+9	9
Netherlands	3	2	0	1	10	6	+4	6
South Africa	3	1	0	2	5	10	−5	3
Switzerland	3	0	0	3	2	10	−8	0

2009-07-11	South Africa	0–5	China	(Netherlands) Amsterdam
16:30 GMT+2		Report	Bi Yan 5' (pen.); Xu Yuan 25'; Pang Fengyue 30'; Yuan Fan 51'; Ma Xiaoxu 61'	Stadium: Olympisch Stadion

2009-07-13	Switzerland	0–2	China	(Netherlands) Amsterdam
16:30 GMT+2		Report	Pang Fengyue 55'; Ma Xiaoxu 88'	Stadium: Olympisch Stadion

2009-07-15	Netherlands	2–4	China	(Netherlands) Amsterdam
19:30 GMT+2		Report	Bi Yan 47' 50'; Pang Fengyue 80'; Liu Sa 88'	Stadium: Olympisch Stadion

==== Other friendly matches ====
2009-02-25	Germany	1–1	China	(Germany) Bielefeld
16:00 GMT+1	Inka Grings 2'	Report	Xu Yuan 20'	Stadium: Bielefelder Alm; Attendance: 17,236; Referee: N/A

2009-07-06	Russia	0–0	China	(Russia) Krasnoarmeysk
18:00 GMT+4		Report		Stadium: Stadion Krasnoarmeysk; Referee: (Russia)

2009-07-09	Russia	0–1	China	(Russia) Krasnoarmeysk
18:00 GMT+4		Report	Xu Yuan 30'	Stadium: Stadion Krasnoarmeysk; Referee: (Russia)

2009-07-19	Sweden	2–0	China	(Sweden) Jönköping
18:00 GMT+2	Therese Sjögran 50'; Jessica Landström 65'	Report		Stadium: Stadsparksvallen; Attendance: 2,918; Referee: (Norway) Christina Pedersen

=== Men's U-23 team ===
==== Football at the 2009 East Asian Games ====
Matches were played in Hong Kong, China in December, 2009

Group Stage

Team	Pld	W	D	L	GF	GA	GD	Pts
Hong Kong	2	1	0	1	4	2	2	3
South Korea	2	1	0	1	4	4	0	3
China	2	1	0	1	1	3	−2	3

6 December 2009
UTC+8 18:00

South Korea	3–0	China
Park Jong-Chan 49', 65'; Kim Ho-You 79' (pen.)	Report by EAG; Report by HKFA

Siu Sai Wan Sports Ground, Hong Kong
Attendance: 3,160
Referee: Sgt Win Cho (Myanmar)

8 December 2009
UTC+8 18:00

China	1–0	Hong Kong
Gao Di 24'	Report by EAG; Report by HKFA

Siu Sai Wan Sports Ground, Hong Kong
Attendance: 6,000
Referee: Phung Dinh Dung (Vietnam)

=== Men's U-20 team ===
==== AFC U-19 Championship 2010 qualification ====
Group G

All matches was held in Zibo, China from November 1 to November 15, 2009

Team	Pts	Pld	W	D	L	GF	GA	GD
China	15	5	5	0	0	29	1	+28
North Korea	12	5	4	0	1	25	5	+20
Malaysia	9	5	3	0	2	19	7	+12
Myanmar	6	5	2	0	3	9	12	−3
Guam	1	5	0	1	4	5	33	−28
Philippines	1	5	0	1	4	4	33	−29

1 November 2009
15:00 UTC+8

China	13–0	Philippines
	Report

Linzi Stadium, Zibo

3 November 2009
16:05 UTC+8

Guam	0–8	China
	Report

Sports Centre, Zibo

6 November 2009
16:05 UTC+8

China	2–0	Myanmar
	Report

Sports Centre, Zibo

8 November 2009
19:30 UTC+8

Malaysia	1–3	China
	Report

Sports Centre, Zibo

11 November 2009
19:30 UTC+8

China	3–0	North Korea
	Report

Sports Centre, Zibo

==== Friendly matches ====
2009-06-20	China	1–0	North Korea	(China) Qinhuangdao
16:00 GMT+8	Sun Bo 32'	Report		Stadium: Qinhuangdao Football Academy

2009-06-23	China	0–1	North Korea	(China) Qinhuangdao
16:00 GMT+8		Report	Lee Hyun-Seong 10'	Stadium: Qinhuangdao Football Academy

2009-06-25	China	2–2	North Korea	(China) Qinhuangdao
16:00 GMT+8	Met 25' (pen.); Zhang Jiaqi 85'	Report	15'; 72'	Stadium: Qinhuangdao Football Academy

2009-09-15	China	5–0	Zimbabwe	(China) Qinhuangdao
19.35 GMT+8	Jiang Zhe 7'; Wang Yunlong 45' 54'; Wang Hao 80' 85'	Report		Stadium: Qinhuangdao Football Academy

2009-09-18	China	3–2	Zimbabwe	(China) Qinhuangdao
16.30 GMT+8	Gao Jian 49'; Jiang Zhe 82' (pen.); Zhang Jian 92'	Report	64'; 73'	Stadium: Qinhuangdao Football Academy

=== Men's U-17 team ===
==== AFC U-16 Championship 2010 qualification ====
Group F

Matches are scheduled to be played from October 3 to 18, 2009 in China

Team	Pld	W	D	L	GF	GA	GD	Pts
China	0	0	0	0	0	0	0	0
Singapore	0	0	0	0	0	0	0	0
Guam	0	0	0	0	0	0	0	0
Hong Kong	0	0	0	0	0	0	0	0
Macau	0	0	0	0	0	0	0	0
Timor-Leste	0	0	0	0	0	0	0	0

=== Men's U-14 team ===
==== Football at the 2009 Asian Youth Games ====
Preliminary Group B

Team	Pld	W	D	L	GF	GA	GD	Pts
South Korea	3	3	0	1	10	3	+7	9
China	3	1	1	1	9	6	+3	4
Pakistan	3	0	2	1	1	3	−2	2
Myanmar	3	0	1	2	5	13	−8	1

2009-06-20	Myanmar	3–7	China	Singapore
17:00 GMT+8	Htwe Aung Myo 14' 44' 64'	Report	Wang Chengkuai 2' 12'; Liang Xueming 8' 39'; Wang Yiran 55' 63'; Xiao Yufeng 72'	Stadium: Temasek Polytechnic; Referee: (Singapore) T. Aravinthan

2009-06-22	Pakistan	0–0	China	Singapore
17:00 GMT+8		Report		Stadium: Temasek Polytechnic; Referee: (Singapore) Muhd Adzhar

2009-06-24	South Korea	3–2	China	Singapore
15:00 GMT+8	Kim Sun-Bin 11'; Lee Hui-Chan 37'; Suh Myeong-Won 40+1'	Report	Yan Peng 12'; Xiao Yufeng 80'	Stadium: Temasek Polytechnic; Referee: (Singapore) Leow Thiam Hoe

Final Group A

Team	Pld	W	D	L	GF	GA	GD	Pts
Iran	3	3	0	0	10	3	+7	9
China	3	2	0	1	12	4	+8	6
Thailand	3	1	0	2	4	12	−8	3
Singapore	3	0	0	3	2	9	−7	0

2009-06-27	Thailand	0–7	China	Singapore
19:30 GMT+8		Report	Long Cheng 3'; Yan Peng 6' 10' 27' 61' 79'; Liang Xueming 40'	Stadium: Jalan Besar Stadium; Referee: (Cambodia) Sreng Haody

2009-06-29	Iran	4–2	China	Singapore
16:00 GMT+8	Bahman Jahantigh 9' 21' 56'; Saeid Aghaei Nojehdeh 44'	Report	Zhou Pengcheng 12'; Long Cheng 32'	Stadium: Temasek Polytechnic; Referee: (Cambodia) Sreng Haody

2009-07-01	Singapore	0–3	China	Singapore
19:30 GMT+8		Report	Yan Peng 26' 35' 45'	Stadium: Jalan Besar Stadium; Referee: (Thailand) Sura Sriart

Semi-final

2009-07-04	South Korea	2–0	China	Singapore
19:30 GMT+8	Suh Myeong-Won 14'; Kim Sun-Bin 80+2' (pen.)	Report		Stadium: Jalan Besar Stadium; Referee: (Singapore) Sukhbir Singh

Bronze medal match

2009-07-06	Iran	2–0	China	Singapore
17:00 GMT+8	Armin Sohrabian 18'; Siavash Haghnazari 35'	Report		Stadium: Jalan Besar Stadium; Referee: (Thailand) Sriart Sura

=== Women's U-20 team ===
==== AFC U-19 Women's Championship 2009 ====
Matches will be held in Wuhan, China from August 1 to 12, 2009

Group B

Team	Pld	W	D	L	GF	GA	GD	Pts
Japan	0	0	0	0	0	0	0	0
China	0	0	0	0	0	0	0	0
Chinese Taipei	0	0	0	0	0	0	0	0
Australia	0	0	0	0	0	0	0	0

==== International tournament in Russia ====
Group B

Team	Pld	W	D	L	GF	GA	GD	Pts
China	4	4	0	0	12	0	+12	12
Poland	4	3	0	1	6	2	+4	9
Belarus	4	1	1	2	2	4	−2	4
Bulgaria	4	1	1	2	1	8	−7	4
Krasnodar Region	4	0	0	4	0	7	−7	0

2009-03-13	Poland	0–2	China	(Russia) Krasnodar
13:00 GMT+3			48' 50'	Stadium: Kuban Stadium

2009-03-14	Belarus	0–3	China	(Russia) Krasnodar
10:00 GMT+3			11' 30' 34'	Stadium: Kuban Stadium

2009-03-16	Bulgaria	0–5	China	(Russia) Krasnodar
10:00 GMT+3			13' 41' 57' 65' 75'	Stadium: Kuban Stadium

2009-03-18	Krasnodar Region	0–2	China	(Russia) Krasnodar
13:00 GMT+3			56' 73'	Stadium: Kuban Stadium

Semi-final

2009-03-21	Russia	0–3	China	(Russia) Krasnodar
10:00 GMT+3			4' 50' 72'	Stadium: Kuban Stadium

Final

2009-03-23	United States	1 – 1 Pen. 4 – 5	China	(Russia) Krasnodar
16:00 GMT+3	73'	Report	Xu Yanlu 60'	Stadium: Kuban Stadium

=== Women's U-17 team ===
==== AFC U-16 Women's Championship 2009 ====
Matches will be held in Bangkok, Thailand from November 4 to 15, 2009

Group B

Team	Pld	W	D	L	GF	GA	GD	Pts
Japan	0	0	0	0	0	0	0	0
Australia	0	0	0	0	0	0	0	0
China	0	0	0	0	0	0	0	0
Chinese Taipei	0	0	0	0	0	0	0	0

=== Women's universities team ===
==== Football at the 2009 Summer Universiade ====
Group A

Team	Pld	W	D	L	GF	GA	GD	Pts
China	3	2	0	1	6	2	+4	6
Canada	3	2	0	1	6	3	+3	6
Serbia	3	1	0	2	3	5	−2	3
Poland	3	1	0	2	2	7	−5	3

2009-06-30	Poland	0–3	China	(Serbia) Belgrade
17:30 GMT+2		Report	Xu Yanfen 45+4'; Wang Dongni 63' 75'	Stadium: Miloš Obilić Stadium; Referee: (France) Sabine Bonnin

2009-07-02	Canada	2–1	China	(Serbia) Belgrade
10:30 GMT+2	Veronique Mayer 45+2'; Nikki Wright 81'	Report	Wang Dandan 30'	Stadium: Omladinski Stadium; Referee: (Republic of Ireland) Rhona Daly

2009-07-04	Serbia	0–2	China	(Serbia) Belgrade
10:30 GMT+2		Report	Sun Yongxia 44'; Liu Jia 90+4'	Stadium: Miloš Obilić Stadium; Referee: (Hungary) Katalin Anna Kulcsar

First place quarter-final

2009-07-06	Japan	1–0	China	(Serbia) Smederevo
17:45 GMT+2	Noriko Matsuda 14'	Report		Stadium: Fortress Stadium; Referee: (Germany) Reim Hussein

Fifth place semi-final

2009-07-08	Brazil	1–0	China	(Serbia) Smederevo
17:30 GMT+2	Villar Viviane 90+6'	Report		Stadium: Fortress Stadium; Referee: (United Kingdom) Pirie Morgan

Seventh place final

2009-07-10	Canada	0–0 (4–3 p)	China	(Serbia) Jakovo
10:30 GMT+2		Report		Stadium: Stadium FK Srem-Jakovo; Referee: (Poland) Karolina Radzik
	Penalties
	Funk Kristen (penalty scored); Flock Kendra (penalty scored); Wallin Keshia (penalty missed); Gagne Andreanne (penalty scored); Briker Jessica (penalty missed); Breen Laura (penalty scored)		(penalty missed) Wang Dongni; (penalty missed) Fan Tingting; (penalty scored) Wang Chen; (penalty scored) Ma Zixiang; (penalty scored) Wang Dandan; (penalty missed) Liu Jia

=== Men's futsal team ===
==== China International Futsal Tournament 2009 ====
Team	Pld	W	D	L	GF	GA	GD	Pts
Netherlands	3	2	0	1	11	9	+2	6
Japan	3	1	2	0	7	6	+1	5
Iran	3	0	2	1	10	11	−1	2
China	3	0	2	1	6	8	−2	2

2009-06-19	China	3–5	Netherlands	(China) Hangzhou
19:45 GMT+8	Zhang Xi 26'; Zhang Xiao 31'; Li Xin 35'	Report	Souf Touzani 13'; Mohammed Attaibi 23'; Dennis Selbach 30' 32'; Kees Thies 34'	Stadium: Yellow Dragon Sports Center; Attendance: 2,000; Referee: (Iran) Karim Sistani

2009-06-20	China	3–3	Iran	(China) Hangzhou
20:40 GMT+8	Zhang Xiao 17'; Zhang Xi 36'; Wang Wei 38'	Report	14' 23'; 25'	Stadium: Yellow Dragon Sports Center; Attendance: N/A; Referee: (Netherlands) Antonius Van Eekelen

2009-06-21	China	0–0	Japan	(China) Hangzhou
14:00 GMT+8		Report		Stadium: Yellow Dragon Sports Center; Attendance: N/A; Referee: N/A

==== EAFF Futsal Championship 2009 ====
EAFF Futsal Championship 2009 is also the qualification match for 2010 AFC Futsal Championship, Matches were held in Beijing, China from November 24th to 29th 2009.

Group Stage:

2009-11-24	China	23–0	Guam	(China) Beijing
19:40GMT+8				Stadium: Beijing University of Technology Gymnasium

2009-11-26	China	5–4	South Korea	(China) Beijing
19:40GMT+8				Stadium: Beijing University of Technology Gymnasium

Kickout Stage:
Semifinal

2009-11-28	China	5–1	Chinese Taipei	(China) Beijing
19:40GMT+8				Stadium: Beijing University of Technology Gymnasium

Final

2009-11-28	China	5–4	Japan	(China) Beijing
19:40GMT+8				Stadium: Beijing University of Technology Gymnasium

=== Women's futsal team ===
==== Futsal at the 2009 Asian Indoor Games ====
Matches will be held in Hanoi, Vietnam from 30 October to 08 November, 2009.
