= 2023 Dalian Professional F.C. season =

Dalian Professional Football Club season

Dalian Pro
- Chairman: Gui Bing(Until 27 Oct.); Li Xuefeng
- Manager: Xie Hui
- Stadium: Dalian Sports Center; Dalian Suoyuwan Stadium
- Chinese Super League: 15th, relegated
- FA Cup: Semi-final
- Highest home attendance: 35,901 (4 Nov.)
- Lowest home attendance: 7,966 (23 Sep.)
- Average home league attendance: 18031
Home colours	Away colours

The 2023 Dalian Professional F.C. season was the 14th season and the last season in team history. The team was in deep trouble throughout the season, and eventually relegated by winning only 3 league matches. The team failed to acquire entry into the 2024 league due to historical debts, and ceased operation on 17 January 2024.

== Overview ==
The CFA decided to ban Dalian Pro from registering new players at the beginning of January for previous salary disputes.

The team started winter training on 8 February for one week, then moved to Haian on 15 February. Multiplayers left the team as their contracts were expired.

As reported, Dalian Pro would be probably banned from transfer by FIFA for one or a few windows for violations in the previous season.

Lin Liangming entered national team's training squad on 26 February. Former Dalian Pro player Sun Guowen was also included.

On 13 March, the team moved again to Shanghai for another stage of preseason training.

Yan Xiangchuang scored the first and the second goal of the 2023 Chinese Super League, setting the team on a flying start. This victory also broke another awkward record that, throughout their Super League seasons (2012–2014, 2018–present), this was the first time that Dalian Pro could win their first match of the season. Previously there were 5 defeats and 3 draws.

Yan Xiangchuang was awarded Player of the Month. At the age of 36, he showed efficiency by scoring three goals out of four matches with only four shots in total.

Dalian Pro was unable to win any match since the first victory. They experienced five consecutive defeats and six consecutive draws in June and July. The team slowly dropped to the relegation zone. The team was able to snatch a tie from league leaders Shanghai Port, but also had desperate matches against relegation opponents Qingdao Hainiu and Nantong Zhiyun.

Gui Bing, chairman of the team, was taken into custody in September. The reason was believed to be connected with Dalian Shanhai Group, the investor of another local football team Dalian Zhixing F.C., as the enterprise was accused of illegal fundraising.

Dalian Pro acquired their second winning upon entering August by a 2–1 victory against Shanghai Shenhua, and the third against relegation opponent Shenzhen. However, the team was unable to acquire another single victory, even when the last two opponents played passive matches. In the last round, if Dalian Pro wins while Nantong finish without victory, Dalian would able to stay in the league. However, as Tsonev missed a critical penalty, the team lost 2–3 to Shanghai Port, finishing this miserable season with a second relegation in the past 3 seasons.

== Squad ==
=== First team squad ===
As of 12 April 2023

No.	Name	Nat.	Place of birth	Date of birth (age)	Joined	From	Note
Goalkeepers
1	Zhang Chong	(China)	(China) Dalian	25 November 1987 (aged 35)	2013	Dalian Shide	
30	Wu Yan	(China)	(China) Yangzhou	7 January 1989 (aged 34)	2022	Shaanxi Chang'an Athletic	
32	Kudirat Ablet	(China)	(China) Yining	5 February 1997 (aged 26)	2021	(Portugal) Gondomar	
36	Wang Jinshuai	(China)	(China) Dalian	9 January 2001 (aged 22)	2021	Dalian Pro youth	With China U-23
Defenders
2	Lin Longchang	(China)	(China) Dalian	24 February 1990 (aged 33)	2022	Guizhou	
3	Zhao Jia'nan	(China)	(China) Zhengzhou	11 August 2004 (aged 18)	2022	Dalian Pro youth	
4	Vas Nuñez	(Hong Kong)	(Hong Kong) Hongkong	22 November 1995 (aged 27)	2022	Meizhou Hakka	
6	Wang Xianjun	(China)	(China) Dalian	1 June 2000 (aged 22)	2020	Dalian Pro youth	
8	Zhu Ting	(China)	(China) Dalian	15 July 1985 (aged 37)	2022	Qingdao	
13	Wang Yaopeng	(China)	(China) Dalian	18 January 1995 (aged 28)	2014	Liaoning youth	
14	Huang Jiahui	(China)	(China) Bozhou	7 October 2000 (aged 22)	2019	Dalian Yifang youth	
16	Liu Le	(China)	(China) Beijing	14 February 1989 (aged 34)	2022	Dalian LFTZ Huayi	
18	He Yupeng	(China)	(China) Anshan	5 December 1999 (aged 23)	2019	Dalian Yifang youth	
Midfielders
5	Wu Wei	(China)	(China) Xinxiang	5 February 1997 (aged 26)	2020	Tianjin Tianhai	
10	Borislav Tsonev	(Bulgaria)	Blagoevgrad	29 April 1995 (aged 27)	2022	(Ukraine) Chornomorets Odesa	
19	Wang Zhen'ao	(China)	(China) Wuhan	10 August 1999 (aged 23)	2020	Dalian Pro youth	
20	Wang Tengda	(China)	(China) Dalian	18 February 2001 (aged 22)	2020	Dalian Pro youth	
22	Chen Rong	(China)	(China) Lu'an	26 January 2001 (aged 22)	2021	Dalian Pro youth	
26	Cui Ming'an	(China)	(China) Dalian	15 November 1994 (aged 28)	2014	Dalian Yifang youth	
28	Fei Yu	(China)	(China) Shanghai	6 February 1991 (aged 32)	2022	Nantong Zhiyun	
31	Lü Peng ^{vc}	(China)	(China) Dalian	28 October 1989 (aged 33)	2022	Qingdao	
35	Wang Yu	(China)	(China) Dalian	28 April 2002 (aged 20)	2021	Dalian Pro youth	
38	Lü Zhuoyi	(China)	(China) Guangzhou	16 April 2001 (aged 21)	2022	Dalian Pro youth	
40	Nemanja Bosančić	(Serbia)	(Serbia and Montenegro) Pristina	1 March 1995 (aged 28)	2022	(Finland) FC Lahti	
Forwards
7	Lin Liangming	(China)	(China) Shantou	4 June 1997 (aged 25)	2020	(Portugal) Gondomar	
9	Shan Huanhuan	(China)	(China) Pingdingshan	24 January 1999 (aged 24)	2019	(Portugal) Vitória Guimarães B	
11	Streli Mamba	(Germany)	(Germany) Göppingen	17 June 1994 (aged 28)	2022	(Kazakhstan) FC Kairat	
15	Zhao Jianbo	(China)	(China) Dalian	7 May 2001 (aged 21)	2020	Dalian Pro youth	
17	Lobi Manzoki	(Central African Republic)	(Democratic Republic of the Congo) Bunia	12 October 1996 (aged 26)	2022	(Uganda) Vipers SC	
23	Shang Yin	(China)	(China) Shanghai	23 January 1989 (aged 34)	2022	Jiangxi Beidamen	
39	Yan Xiangchuang ^{c}	(China)	(China) Dalian	5 September 1986 (aged 36)	2022	Beijing BSU	
Unregistered during the season
27	Yang Pengju	(China)	(China) Guiyang	6 June 2000 (aged 22)	2020	Dalian Pro youth	
25	Feng Zeyuan	(China)	(China) Guilin	19 November 2001 (aged 21)	2022	Dalian Pro youth	
33	Song Zhiwei	(China)	(China) Dalian	19 March 1989 (aged 34)	2022	Wuhan Yangtze River	Loaned out

== Coaching staff ==
As of 5 May 2022

Position	Name	Notes
First team
Head coach	(China) Xie Hui	
Assistant coach	(Hong Kong) Ng Wai Chiu	
Assistant coach	(China) Chang Lin	
Goalkeeping coach	(Brazil) Everton da Rocha Santos	
Fitness coach	(Spain) Alex Ros Cladella	
Tactical Analyst	(Spain) Aitor Calero Garcia	
Team doctor		
Reserve and youth teams
Reserve (U-23) coach	(Spain) David Rivas Martínez	
U-21 coach	(China) Liu Yujian	
U-21 assistant coach	(China) Zhou Ting	
U-19 coach	(China) Sun Wei	
U-17 coach	(China) Zhang Yaokun	
U-17 assistant coach	(China) Li Wenbo	
U-15 coach	(China) Zhao Peng	
U-15 assistant coach	(China) Chi Yaojun	
U-14 coach	(China) Li Yang	
U-15 assistant coach	(China) Zou Jie	
U-13 coach	(China) Wang Zhaochen	

== Transfers ==
=== Pre-season ===
==== In ====
No.	Pos.	Name	Age	Moving from	Type	Transfer fee	Date	Notes	Ref.
-	FW	(China) Chen Rong	22	(China) Liaoning Shenyang Urban	Loan Return	—	1 January		
-	MF	(China) Zhu Jiaxuan	24	(China) Liaoning Shenyang Urban	Loan Return	—	1 January		
-	GK	(China) Li Xuebo	23	(China) Zibo Cuju	Loan Return	—	1 January		

==== Out ====
No.	Pos.	Name	Age	Moving to	Type	Transfer fee	Date	Notes	Ref.
11	DF	(China) Sun Guowen	29	(China) Shandong Taishan	Released		31 March		
16	DF	(China) Tong Lei	25	(China) Shandong Taishan	Released		31 March		
22	DF	(China) Dong Yanfeng	27	(China) Chengdu Rongcheng	Free		5 April		
37	FW	(China) Ning Hao	38	—	End of contract		1 January		
3	DF	(China) Shan Pengfei	29	(China) Guangxi Pingguo Haliao	Free		31 March		
21	MF	(China) Gui Zihan	19	(China) Qingdao West Coast	Loan		4 April		
12	MF	(China) Zhang Jiansheng	23	(China) Shanghai Jiading Huilong	Loan		6 April		
-	MF	(China) Wan Yu	20	(China) Shijiazhuang Gongfu	Free		6 April		
-	GK	(China) Li Xuebo	23	(China) Dandong Tengyue	Loan		6 April		
40	MF	(China) Zhu Jiaxuan	23	(China) Heilongjiang Ice City	Loan		6 April		

=== Mid-season ===
==== Out ====
No.	Pos.	Name	Age	Moving to	Type	Transfer fee	Date	Notes	Ref.
33	MF	Song Zhiwei	34	(China) Guangxi Pingguo Haliao	Loan		1 July		
-	GK	(China) Li Xuebo	23	(China) Liaoning Shenyang Urban	Loan		12 July		

== Friendlies ==
Preseason

1 March 2023 Friendly	Dalian Pro	1–5	Beijing Guoan	Haikou, Hainan
	Yang Pengju		Kang Sang-woo; Cao Yongjing; Xu Dongdong; Yan Yu	Stadium: Mission Hills Soccer Academy Stadium

5 March 2023 Friendly	Dalian Pro	4–1	Shanghai Mitsubishi Heavy Industries Fly Lions	Haikou, Hainan
	Shan Huanhuan; Yan Xiangchuang; Mamba			Stadium: Mission Hills Soccer Academy Stadium

8 March 2023 Friendly	Dalian Pro	1–0	Tianjin Jinmen Tiger	Haikou, Hainan
15:00 (UTC+08:00)	Manzoki			Stadium: Mission Hills Soccer Academy Stadium

18 March 2023 Friendly	Dalian Pro	2–0	Shandong Taishan	Shanghai
12:30 (UTC+08:00)	Mamba 56'; Vas Núñez 72'			Stadium: Shanghai Qiantan Sports Park

22 March 2023 Friendly	Dalian Pro	5–2	Nanjing City	Shanghai
15:30 (UTC+08:00)	Fei Yu 19'; Bosancic 21'; Yan Xiangchuang 54'; Mamba 66'; Wu Wei 75'		Duan Yunzi; Ma Junliang	Stadium: Kangqiao training grounds

25 March 2023 Friendly	Dalian Pro	1–0	Shanghai Jiading Huilong	Shanghai
14:30 (UTC+08:00)	Bosancic 40'			Stadium: Jiading City Sports Center

29 March 2023 Friendly	Dalian Pro	1–3	Qingdao Hainiu	Shanghai
14:30 (UTC+08:00)	Yan Xiangchuang 10'		Evans Kangwa; Felicio Brown Forbes	Stadium: Shanghai Qiantan Sports Park

8 April 2023 Friendly	Dalian Pro	4–2	Dalian Zhixing	Dalian, Liaoning
15:00 (UTC+08:00)	Yan Xiangchuang; Wang Zhen'ao; Tsonev		Liu Yang; Zhao Xuebin	Stadium: Dalian Pro Soccer Academy Base

== Chinese Super League ==
=== Standings ===
Pos	Team	Pld	W	D	L	GF	GA	GD	Pts	Qualification or relegation
12	Cangzhou Mighty Lions	30	8	7	15	29	60	−31	31	
13	Qingdao Hainiu	30	7	7	16	34	45	−11	28	
14	Nantong Zhiyun	30	4	10	16	26	42	−16	22	
15	Dalian Pro	30	3	11	16	25	47	−22	20	Dissolved
16	Shenzhen	30	3	3	24	22	79	−57	12	Dissolved

Source: Soccerway
Rules for classification:
- During season: 1) Points; 2) Goal difference; 3) Goals scored.
- After season: 1) Points; 2) Head-to-head points; 3) Head-to-head goal difference; 4) Head-to-head goals scored; 5) Scores of the weight ratio of the reserve league and youth leagues.

=== Results summary ===
Overall								Home						Away					
Pld	W	D	L	GF	GA	GD	Pts	W	D	L	GF	GA	GD	W	D	L	GF	GA	GD
30	3	11	16	25	47	−22	20	3	7	5	15	20	−5	0	4	11	10	27	−17

=== Positions by round ===
Round	1	2	3	4	5	6	7	8	9	10	11	12	13	14	15	16	17	18	19	20	21	22	23	24	25	26	27	28	29	30
Ground	H	A	H	H	A	H	A	A	H	H	A	H	A	H	A	A	H	A	A	H	A	H	H	A	A	H	A	H	A	H
Result	W	L	D	D	L	D	L	L	L	L	L	D	D	D	D	D	D	L	L	W	L	W	L	L	L	D	L	L	D	L
Position	3	6	7	7	8	9	13	14	15	15	16	16	16	16	16	15	15	15	15	14	15	14	15	15	15	15	15	15	15	15

Updated to match(es) played on 4 November 2023. Source: Results
= Leader and qualification for AFC Champions League Elite group stage; = Qualification for AFC Champions League Elite play-off round; = Qualification for AFC Champions League Two group stage; = Relegation to China League One

=== Fixtures and results ===
15 April 2023 1	Dalian Pro	2–1	Nantong Zhiyun	Dalian, Liaoning
19:35 (UTC+08:00)	Yan Xiangchuang 4', 7'; Wu Yan (yellow card) 86'	Report	Romário Baldé 26'; Liu Wei (yellow card) 30'	Stadium: Dalian Sports Center; Attendance: 22,199; Referee: Xing Qi; Assistant referees: Sun Kai, Tang Rongdi; Fourth official: Liu Zhao

22 April 2023 2	Changchun Yatai	3–2	Dalian Pro	Changchun, Jilin
19:35 (UTC+08:00)	Serginho 6'; Liao Chengjian (yellow card) 77' (goal) 79', 90+6'; Peter Žulj (yellow card) 85'	Report	He Yupeng (yellow card) 12'; Wang Yu (yellow card) 64'; Tsonev 72'; Mamba 90+4'	Stadium: Changchun Stadium; Attendance: 19,685; Referee: Li Haixin; Assistant referees: Tang Chao, Yang Delin; Fourth official: Li Zheng

26 April 2023 3	Dalian Pro	0–0	Chengdu Rongcheng	Dalian, Liaoning
19:35 (UTC+08:00)	Wang Yu (yellow card) 28'; Huang Jiahui (yellow card) 61'; Lin Liangming (yellow card) 90+5'; Zhu Ting (yellow card) 90+6'	Report	Felipe (yellow card) 67'; Gan Chao (yellow card) 73'	Stadium: Dalian Sports Center; Attendance: 9,651; Referee: Ai Kun; Assistant referees: Zhang Meilin, Wang Xihong; Fourth official: Chen Jindong

1 May 2023 4	Dalian Pro	1-1	Meizhou Hakka	Dalian, Liaoning
19:35 (UTC+08:00)	Yan Xiangchuang 63'; Wang Zhenao (yellow card) 70'; Lü Peng (yellow card) 80'; Tsonev (yellow card) 83'	Report	Egbuchulam (yellow card) 16'; Chen Jie (yellow card) 53'; Shi Liang 88'	Stadium: Dalian Sports Center Stadium; Attendance: 23,028; Referee: Fu Ming; Assistant referees: Yang Yang, Li Xingfeng; Fourth official: Sun Lei

5 May 2023 5	Shanghai Shenhua	1–0	Dalian Pro	Shanghai
19:35 (UTC+08:00)	Jiang Shenglong (yellow card) 71'; Yu Hanchao 82'	Report	Mamba (yellow card) 66'	Stadium: Shanghai Stadium; Attendance: 28,732; Referee: Memetjan Ahmat; Assistant referees: Guo Jingtao, Yang Delin; Fourth official: Sun Shengyu

9 May 2023 6	Dalian Pro	1–1	Cangzhou Mighty Lions	Dalian, Liaoning
19:35 (UTC+08:00)	Lin Liangming 57'; Vas Núñez (yellow card) 61'	Report	Škorić (yellow card) 45+1'; Oscar Maritu 55'	Stadium: Dalian Sports Center Stadium; Attendance: 11,237; Referee: Zhen Wei; Assistant referees: Shi Xiang, Zheng Chao; Fourth official: Ren Tong

13 May 2023 7	Shenzhen F.C.	2–1	Dalian Pro	Shenzhen, Guangdong
19:35 (UTC+08:00)	Du Yuezheng (yellow card) 35'; Frank Acheampong 45+2', 90+2'; Zhang Yuan (yellow card) 46'; Jiang Zhipeng (yellow card) 67'	Report	Manzoki 10'; Bosancic (yellow card) 71'; He Yupeng (yellow card) 73'	Stadium: Shenzhen Universiade Sports Centre; Attendance: 9,825; Referee: Wang Zhe; Assistant referees: Sun Kai, Deng Bo; Fourth official: Hei Xiaohu

20 May 2023 8	Henan F.C.	1–0	Dalian Pro	Zhengzhou, Henan
19:35 (UTC+08:00)	Nemanja Čović 44' (yellow card) 49'	Report	Bosancic (yellow card) 90+2'	Stadium: Zhengzhou Hanghai Stadium; Attendance: 17,368; Referee: Fu Ming; Assistant referees: Guo Jingtao, Luo Zheng; Fourth official: Gan Shuran

24 May 2023 9	Dalian Pro	1–2	Zhejiang F.C.	Dalian, Liaoning
19:35 (UTC+08:00)	Lin Liangming (yellow card) 38'; Tsonev (yellow card) 72'; Manzoki 89'; Wang Zhen'ao (yellow card) 90+1'	Report	Nyasha Mushekwi 18'; Franko Andrijašević 23'; Sun Zheng'ao (yellow card) 79'	Stadium: Dalian Sports Center Stadium; Attendance: 8,838; Referee: Tang Shunqi; Assistant referees: Cao Yi, Yang Delin; Fourth official: Sun Lei

28 May 2023 10	Dalian Pro	0–1	Tianjin Jinmen Tiger	Dalian, Liaoning
19:35 (UTC+08:00)	Tsonev (yellow card) 25'; Lin Longchang (yellow card) 56'	Report	Han Pengfei (yellow card) 12'; David Andújar (yellow card) 43'; Robert Berić (yellow card) 85'; Tian Yinong (yellow card) 88'; Song Zhiwei 90+5' (o.g.)	Stadium: Dalian Sports Center Stadium; Attendance: 8,977; Referee: Ma Li; Assistant referees: Zhou Fei, Wang Xihong; Fourth official: Ren Tong

3 June 2023 11	Shandong Taishan	2–0	Dalian Pro	Jinan, Shandong
19:35 (UTC+08:00)	Li Yuanyi (yellow card) 15'; Marouane Fellaini 36'; Huang Zhengyu 45+1'; Hu Jinghang (yellow card) 90'	Report	Wang Zhen'ao (yellow card) 30'; Bosancic (yellow card) 79'	Stadium: Jinan Olympic Sports Center Stadium; Attendance: 36,673; Referee: Huang Yi; Assistant referees: Shi Xiang, Kong Lingda; Fourth official: Ma Yunkun

9 June 2023 12	Dalian Pro	2–2	Beijing Guoan	Dalian, Liaoning
19:35 (UTC+08:00)	Manzoki 16', 45+1'; He Yupeng (yellow card) 59'; Lin Longchang (yellow card) 68'; Wu Yan (yellow card) 73'	Report	Zhang Chengdong (yellow card) 57'; Feng Boxuan (yellow card) 57'; Lin Longchang 77' (o.g.); Kang Sang-woo 86' (pen.)	Stadium: Dalian Sports Center Stadium; Attendance: 11,886; Referee: Xing Qi; Assistant referees: Luo Zheng, Li Xingfeng; Fourth official: Gan Shuran

28 June 2023 13	Wuhan Three Towns	0–0	Dalian Pro	Wuhan, Hubei
19:35 (UTC+08:00)	Stanciu (yellow card) 45'	Report	Wang Yu (yellow card) 90+2'	Stadium: Wuhan Sports Center Stadium; Attendance: 11,893; Referee: Tang Shunqi; Assistant referees: Sun Kai, Jian Wei; Fourth official: Xu Qiangqiang

2 July 2023 14	Dalian Pro	1–1	Qingdao Hainiu	Dalian, Liaoning
19:35 (UTC+08:00)	Manzoki (yellow card) 32'; Wang Zhen'ao (yellow card) 71'; Tsonev (yellow card) 86'; Wang Xianjun (yellow card) 90+12'	Report	Liu Junshuai (yellow card) 36'; Elvis Sarić (yellow card) 70'; Felicio Brown Forbes 73' (pen.); Evans Kangwa (yellow card) 86'	Stadium: Dalian Suoyuwan Stadium; Attendance: 33,679; Referee: Ma Ning; Assistant referees: Shi Xiang, Xi Fei; Fourth official: Sun Shengyu

8 July 2023 15	Shanghai Port	1–1	Dalian Pro	Shanghai
19:35 (UTC+08:00)	Li Shenglong 45+4'	Report	Yan Xiangchuang 45+2'; Fei Yu (yellow card) 52'; Vas Núñez (red card) 67'; Wu Yan (yellow card) 90+2'	Stadium: Pudong Football Stadium; Attendance: 15,785; Referee: Du Jianxin; Assistant referees: Cao Yi, Zhao Honglei; Fourth official: Liang Caiwei

12 July 2023 16	Nantong Zhiyun	1–1	Dalian Pro	Nantong, Jiangsu
19:35 (UTC+08:00)	David Puclin 51'; Romário Baldé (yellow card) 63'	Report	Wang Yaopeng (yellow card) 50'; Mamba 79'; Wang Xianjun (red card) 82'	Stadium: Rugao Olympic Center Stadium; Attendance: 16,652; Referee: Memetjan Ahmat; Assistant referees: Deng Bo, Li Yingbin; Fourth official: Ma Yunkun

16 July 2023 17	Dalian Pro	0–0	Changchun Yatai	Dalian, Liaoning
19:35 (UTC+08:00)	Wu Wei (yellow card) 50'; Wang Yu (yellow card) 56'	Report	Abduhamit (yellow card) 11'; Sabit (yellow card) 16'; Cheng Changcheng (yellow card) 54'; Yan Zhiyu (yellow card) 85'	Stadium: Dalian Suoyuwan Football Stadium; Attendance: 35,588; Referee: Guan Xing; Assistant referees: Ma Ji, Yang Delin; Fourth official: Chen Jindong

20 July 2023 18	Chengdu Rongcheng	4–1	Dalian Pro	Leshan, Sichuan
19:35 (UTC+08:00)	Felipe 13', 19', 66'; Feng Zhuoyi 49'	Report	Wu Wei (yellow card) 4'; Mamba 9'	Stadium: Leshan Olympic Sports Center Stadium; Attendance: 17,193; Referee: Fu Ming; Assistant referees: Cao Yi, Tang Chao; Fourth official: Sun Shengyu

29 July 2023 19	Meizhou Hakka	2–1	Dalian Pro	Meizhou, Guangdong
19:35 (UTC+08:00)	Tyrone Conraad 8'; Nebojša Kosović 37'; Shi Liang (yellow card) 90+6'	Report	Manzoki 11' (yellow card) 90'; He Yupeng (yellow card) 28'; Núñez (yellow card) 79'	Stadium: Wuhua Olympic Sports Center Huitang Stadium; Attendance: 17,633; Referee: Tang Shunqi; Assistant referees: Xi Fei, Zhang Yanbin; Fourth official: Liu Zhao

5 August 2023 20	Dalian Pro	2–1	Shanghai Shenhua	Dalian, Liaoning
19:35 (UTC+08:00)	Manzoki 25'; Lin Liangming 31'; Núñez (yellow card) 80'; Wu Yan (yellow card) 90+7'; Wang Xianjun (yellow card) 90+8'	Report	Jin Yangyang 63'	Stadium: Dalian Sports Center; Attendance: 18,118; Referee: Niu Minghui; Assistant referees: Tang Rongdi, Yuan Kun; Fourth official: Lin Xinyu

9 August 2023 21	Cangzhou Mighty Lions	2–1	Dalian Pro	Cangzhou, Hebei
19:35 (UTC+08:00)	Liu Yang (yellow card) 22'; Lin Chuangyi (yellow card) 32'; Owusu-Sekyere 45+1'; Wang Peng (yellow card) 77'; Shao Puliang (yellow card) 90+2'	Report	Mamba (yellow card) 45+4' (yellow-red card) 90'; Lin Liangming 86'	Stadium: Cangzhou Stadium; Attendance: 8,965; Referee: Ma Ning; Assistant referees: Zhou Fei, Jin Chao; Fourth official: Sun Lei

13 August 2023 22	Dalian Pro	2–1	Shenzhen F.C.	Dalian, Liaoning
19:35 (UTC+08:00)	Tsonev 29' (yellow card) 90+2'; Lin Liangming 69'; Manzoki (yellow card) 85' (yellow-red card) 90'; Shang Yin (yellow card) 90+4'	Report	Romain Alessandrini 39'; Liu Yue (yellow card) 66' (yellow-red card) 90+9'; Pei Shuai (yellow card) 90+7'	Stadium: Puwan Stadium; Attendance: 13,981; Referee: Wang Di; Assistant referees: Zhang Cheng, Deng Bo; Fourth official: Hei Xiaohu

19 August 2023 23	Dalian Pro	0–3	Henan F.C.	Dalian, Liaoning
19:35 (UTC+08:00)	Tsonev (yellow card) 81'	Report	Đorđe Denić 23'; Adrian Mierzejewski 25'; Ke Zhao (yellow card) 29'; Huang Zichang 42'; Dilyimit Tudi (yellow card) 85'	Stadium: Puwan Stadium; Attendance: 13,899; Referee: Shi Zhenlu; Assistant referees: Guo Jingtao, Tang Rongdi; Fourth official: Sun Shengyu

26 August 2023 24	Zhejiang F.C.	3–0	Dalian Pro	Huzhou, Zhejiang
19:35 (UTC+08:00)	Kouassi 14'; Mushekwi 70'; Cheng Jin 80'	Report	Tsonev (yellow card) 33'	Stadium: Huzhou Olympic Sports Center; Attendance: 19,367; Referee: Du Jianxin; Assistant referees: Wang Xihong, Jin Jun; Fourth official: Liu Xinyu

17 September 2023 25	Tianjin Jinmen Tiger	1–0	Dalian Pro	Tianjin
17:30 (UTC+08:00)	Guo Hao 5' (yellow card) 25'; Qian Yumiao (yellow card) 16'; Fran Mérida (yellow card) 90+6'	Report	Shang Yin (yellow card) 23'; Manzoki (yellow card) 30'; Zhu Ting (yellow card) 73'; Nunez (red card) 89'	Stadium: TEDA Football Stadium; Attendance: 28,550; Referee: Li Haixin; Assistant referees: Liu Xing, Zhang Haijun; Fourth official: Jia Zhiliang

23 September 2023 26	Dalian Pro	0–0	Shandong Taishan	Dalian, Liaoning
17:30 (UTC+08:00)	Wu Yan (yellow card) 90+6'	Report	Xie Wenneng (yellow card) 34'	Stadium: Puwan Stadium; Attendance: 7,966; Referee: Shi Zhenlu; Assistant referees: Sun Kai, Hu Chengjun; Fourth official: Sun Lei

30 September 2023 27	Beijing Guoan	2–0	Dalian Pro	Beijing
17:30 (UTC+08:00)	Yang Liyu (yellow card) 35' (goal) 69'; Fábio Abreu 73'; Li Ke (yellow card) 90+2'	Report	Zhu Ting (yellow card) 8'; Wang Yaopeng (yellow card) 45+2'; Lü Peng (yellow card) 53'; Wang Xianjun (yellow card) 75'	Stadium: Workers' Stadium; Attendance: 41,148; Referee: Memetjan Ahmat; Assistant referees: Cao Yi, Xi Fei; Fourth official: Shan Dan'ao

20 October 2023 28	Dalian Pro	1–3	Wuhan Three Towns	Dalian, Liaoning
15:30 (UTC+08:00)	Manzoki 42'; Fei Yu (yellow card) 90+4'	Report	Abdul-Aziz Yakubu 23' (pen.); Davidson 31'; Park Ji-soo 71'; Gao Zhunyi (red card) 84'; Ren Hang (yellow card) 87'	Stadium: Dalian Suoyuwan Football Stadium; Attendance: 15,516; Referee: Ai Kun; Assistant referees: Tang Chao, Jin Jun; Fourth official: Chen Jindong

29 October 2023 29	Qingdao Hainiu	2–2	Dalian Pro	Qingdao, Shandong
15:30 (UTC+08:00)	Evans Kangwa 22'; Xu Dong 44'; Elvis Sarić (yellow card) 72'	Report	Tsonev 49' (pen.), 79'; Shang Yin (yellow card) 82'	Stadium: Qingdao Youth Football Stadium; Attendance: 13,088; Referee: Ma Li; Assistant referees: Ma Ji, Zhao Wei; Fourth official: Liu Zhao

4 November 2023 30	Dalian Pro	2–3	Shanghai Port	Dalian, Liaoning
15:30 (UTC+08:00)	Manzoki 39'; Yan Xiangchuang 56' (pen.); Tsonev (penalty missed) 85'	Report	Li Ang 71'; Wu Lei 79' (pen.), 90+4'	Stadium: Dalian Suoyuwan Football Stadium; Attendance: 35,901; Referee: Shi Zhenlu; Assistant referees: Sun Kai, Wang Xihong; Fourth official: Sun Shengyu

== Chinese FA Cup ==
=== FA Cup fixtures and results ===
22 June 2023 3rd round	Yanbian Longding	0–2	Dalian Pro	Yanbian, Jilin
15:30 (UTC+08:00)		Report	Shang Yin 61'; Tsonev 67'; Lü Peng (yellow card) 74'; He Yupeng (yellow card) 90+3'	Stadium: Yanji Nationwide Fitness Centre Stadium; Attendance: 7,633; Referee: Niu Minghui; Assistant referees: Zhang Meilin, Wu Mingfeng; Fourth official: Su Zihao

25 July 2023 4rd round	Dalian Pro	1–1 (5–3 p)	Henan F.C.	Dalian, Liaoning
15:30 (UTC+08:00)	Wang Yu (yellow card) 37'; Zhao Jianbo 51'; Shang Yin (yellow card) 69'	Report	Mierzejewski 27'; Zhao Yuhao (yellow card) 44'; Ke Zhao (yellow card) 59'	Stadium: Jinzhou Stadium; Attendance: 3,031; Referee: Ren Tong; Assistant referees: Wang Xihong, Ma Qiang; Fourth official: Niu Minghui
	Penalties
	Tsonev (penalty scored); Zhao Jianbo (penalty scored); Fei Yu (penalty scored); Núñez (penalty scored); Lin Liangming (penalty scored)		(penalty scored) Mierzejewski; (penalty scored) Dilyimit Tudi; (penalty scored) Chen Keqiang; (penalty missed) Zhong Yihao

30 August 2023 Quarter-finals	Dalian Pro	2–0	Tianjin Jinmen Tiger	Dalian, Liaoning
18:30 (UTC+08:00)	Mamba 72' (yellow card) 86'; Yan Xiangchuang 86'	Report		Stadium: Jinzhou Stadium; Attendance: 2,023; Referee: Shi Zhenlu; Assistant referees: Wang Xihong, Zhao Wei; Fourth official: Zhang Xiaochen

25 September 2023 Semi-finals	Dalian Pro	0–2	Shandong Taishan	Dalian, Liaoning
19:30 (UTC+08:00)	Chen Rong (yellow card) 22'; Zhao Jianbo (yellow card) 26'	Report	Jadson (red card) 19'; Matheus Pato 27'; Li Yuanyi (yellow card) 39'; Fellaini 70'	Stadium: Jinzhou Stadium; Attendance: 3,111; Referee: Li Haixin; Assistant referees: Cao Yi, Tang Chao; Fourth official: Jia Zhiliang

== Squad statistics ==
=== Appearances and goals ===
No.	Pos.	Player	Nat.	Super League			FA Cup			Total		
No.	Pos.	Player	Nat.	App.	Starts	Goals	App.	Starts	Goals	App.	Starts	Goals
1	GK	Zhang Chong	(China)	6	6	0	0	0	0	6	6	0
2	DF	Lin Longchang	(China)	17	13	0	3	3	0	20	16	0
3	MF	Zhao Jia'nan	(China)	2	1	0	2	2	0	4	3	0
4	DF	Vas Núñez	(Hong Kong)	21	20	0	2	1	0	23	21	0
5	MF	Wu Wei	(China)	15	14	0	0	0	0	15	14	0
6	DF	Wang Xianjun	(China)	16	15	0	2	1	0	18	16	0
7	MF	Lin Liangming	(China)	25	22	5	2	1	0	27	23	5
8	DF	Zhu Ting	(China)	22	13	0	3	2	0	25	15	0
9	FW	Shan Huanhuan	(China)	2	0	0	0	0	0	2	0	0
10	MF	Borislav Tsonev	(Bulgaria)	27	24	4	4	2	1	31	26	5
11	FW	Streli Mamba	(Germany)	26	20	3	1	1	1	27	21	4
13	DF	Wang Yaopeng	(China)	11	9	0	1	1	0	12	10	0
14	DF	Huang Jiahui	(China)	19	13	0	3	2	0	22	15	0
15	FW	Zhao Jianbo	(China)	5	0	0	3	1	1	8	1	1
16	DF	Liu Le	(China)	1	1	0	0	0	0	1	1	0
17	FW	Lobi Manzoki	(Central African Republic)	21	18	8	2	2	0	23	20	8
18	DF	He Yupeng	(China)	21	18	0	1	0	0	22	18	0
19	MF	Wang Zhen'ao	(China)	22	17	0	1	1	0	23	18	0
20	MF	Wang Tengda	(China)	1	0	0	2	2	0	3	2	0
22	MF	Chen Rong	(China)	2	1	0	2	2	0	4	3	0
23	FW	Shang Yin	(China)	27	12	0	3	1	1	30	13	1
25	FW	Feng Zeyuan	(China)	0	0	0	0	0	0	0	0	0
26	MF	Cui Ming'an	(China)	2	0	0	2	2	0	4	2	0
28	MF	Fei Yu	(China)	17	7	0	3	3	0	20	10	0
30	GK	Wu Yan	(China)	23	23	0	0	0	0	23	23	0
31	MF	Lü Peng	(China)	27	25	0	2	2	0	29	27	0
32	GK	Kudirat Ablet	(China)	1	1	0	4	4	0	5	5	0
33	MF	Song Zhiwei	(China)	1	0	0	0	0	0	1	0	0
35	MF	Wang Yu	(China)	18	13	0	3	3	0	21	16	0
36	GK	Wang Jinshuai	(China)	0	0	0	3	3	0	3	3	0
38	MF	Lü Zhuoyi	(China)	5	1	0	3	3	0	8	4	0
39	FW	Yan Xiangchuang	(China)	25	13	5	2	0	1	27	13	6
40	MF	Nemanja Bosančić	(Serbia)	17	9	0	1	1	0	18	10	0
TOTALS						25			5			30

=== Goalscorers ===
Rank	Player	Goals (Penalties)		
Rank	Player	Super League	FA Cup	Total
1	Manzoki	8	0	8
2	Yan Xiangchuang	5	1	6
3	Lin Liangming	5	0	5
4	Tsonev	4	1	5
5	Mamba	3	1	4
6	Shang Yin	0	1	1
6	Zhao Jianbo	0	1	1
TOTALS		25	5	30

Last updated: 4 November 2023.
Source: Results

=== Disciplinary record ===
No.	Pos.	Player	Super League			FA Cup			Total		
No.	Pos.	Player	Yellow card	(yellow card) (yellow-red card)	Red card	Yellow card	(yellow card) (yellow-red card)	Red card	Yellow card	(yellow card) (yellow-red card)	Red card
1	GK	Zhang Chong	0	0	0	0	0	0	0	0	0
2	DF	Lin Longchang	2	0	0	0	0	0	0	0	0
3	MF	Zhao Jia'nan	0	0	0	0	0	0	0	0	0
4	DF	Vas Núñez	3	0	2	0	0	0	3	0	2
5	MF	Wu Wei	2	0	0	0	0	0	2	0	0
6	DF	Wang Xianjun	3	0	1	0	0	0	3	0	1
7	MF	Lin Liangming	2	0	0	0	0	0	2	0	0
8	DF	Zhu Ting	3	0	0	0	0	0	3	0	0
9	FW	Shan Huanhuan	0	0	0	0	0	0	0	0	0
10	MF	Borislav Tsonev	7	0	0	0	0	0	7	0	0
11	FW	Streli Mamba	2	1	0	1	0	0	3	1	0
13	DF	Wang Yaopeng	2	0	0	0	0	0	2	0	0
14	DF	Huang Jiahui	1	0	0	0	0	0	1	0	0
15	FW	Zhao Jianbo	0	0	0	1	0	0	1	0	0
16	DF	Liu Le	0	0	0	0	0	0	0	0	0
17	FW	Lobi Manzoki	4	1	0	0	0	0	4	1	0
18	DF	He Yupeng	4	0	0	1	0	0	5	0	0
19	MF	Wang Zhen'ao	4	0	0	0	0	0	4	0	0
20	MF	Wang Tengda	0	0	0	0	0	0	0	0	0
22	MF	Chen Rong	0	0	0	1	0	0	0	0	0
23	FW	Shang Yin	3	0	0	1	0	0	4	0	0
25	FW	Feng Zeyuan	0	0	0	0	0	0	0	0	0
26	MF	Cui Ming'an	0	0	0	0	0	0	0	0	0
28	MF	Fei Yu	2	0	0	0	0	0	2	0	0
30	GK	Wu Yan	5	0	0	0	0	0	5	0	0
31	MF	Lü Peng	2	0	0	1	0	0	3	0	0
32	GK	Kudirat Ablet	0	0	0	0	0	0	0	0	0
33	MF	Song Zhiwei	0	0	0	0	0	0	0	0	0
35	MF	Wang Yu	4	0	0	1	0	0	5	0	0
38	MF	Lü Zhuoyi	0	0	0	0	0	0	0	0	0
39	FW	Yan Xiangchuang	0	0	0	0	0	0	0	0	0
40	MF	Nemanja Bosančić	3	0	0	0	0	0	3	0	0
TOTALS			58	2	3	7	0	0	65	2	3

=== Injuries ===
Player	Injury	Duration	Notes
Lin Liangming	Ligament injuries to the knee	9 Sep. –	
He Yupeng	Broken rib		

=== Suspensions ===
Player	Length	Reason	Date(s) served	Opponent	Ref.
Wang Zhen'ao	1 match	4 Yellow Cards accumulated	9 Jun.	Beijing Guoan	
Tsonev	1 match	4 Yellow Cards accumulated	8 Jul.	Shanghai Port	
Vas Núñez	1 match	Red Card vs. Shanghai Port	12 Jul.	Nantong Zhiyun	
Wang Xianjun	1 match	Red Card vs. Nantong Zhiyun	16 Jul.	Changchun Yatai	
Wang Yu	1 match	4 Yellow Cards accumulated	22 Jul.	Chengdu Rongcheng	
He Yupeng	1 match	4 Yellow Cards accumulated	5 Aug.	Shanghai Shenhua	
Wu Yan	1 match	4 Yellow Cards accumulated	9 Aug.	Cangzhou Mighty Lions	
Mamba	1 match	Red Card vs. Cangzhou Mighty Lions	13 Aug.	Shenzhen	
Manzoki	1 match	Red Card vs. Shenzhen	19 Aug.	Henan	
Vas Núñez	1 match	Red Card vs. Tianjin JM Tiger	23 Sep.	Shandong Taishan	
Manzoki	1 match	4 Yellow Cards accumulated	23 Sep.	Shandong Taishan	
