= Wang Quan =

Wang Quan is the name of:

- Wang Quan (footballer) (born 1989), Chinese association footballer
- Wang Quan (handballer) (born 1992), Chinese handballer
- Wang Quan (politician, born 1960), a Chinese politician.
