= Football at the 2009 Asian Youth Games =

- Venue: Temasek Polytechnic; Meridian Junior College; Victoria Junior College; Jurong Junior College; Jalan Besar Stadium
- Dates: 20 June – 6 July 2009

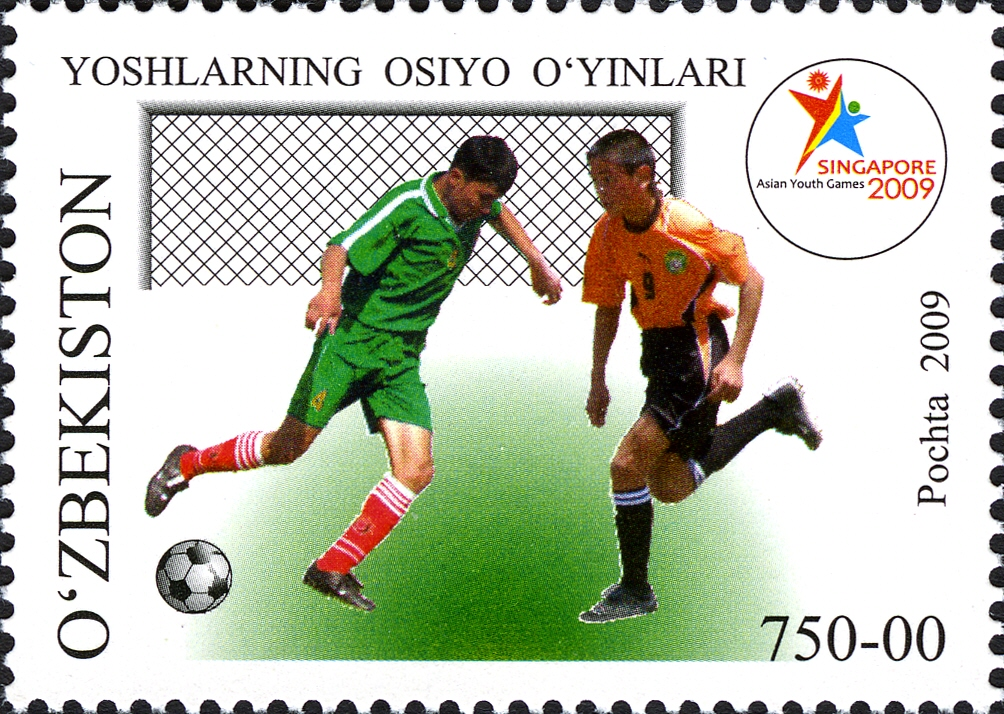
Stamp of Uzbekistan, 2009

Football at the 2009 Asian Youth Games was held from 20 June to 6 July 2009 in Singapore. Matches took place at Jalan Besar Stadium and four educational institutions: Temasek Polytechnic, Meridian Junior College, Victoria Junior College, and Jurong Junior College. The tournament was contested by under-14 teams.

South Korea won the gold medal, defeating North Korea 2–0 in the final. The Philippines and Hong Kong withdrew from the tournament after their teams were quarantined following positive tests for H1N1 influenza among players during the 2009 swine flu pandemic.

== Medalists ==
| Event | Gold | Silver | Bronze |
|---|---|---|---|
| Boys | South Korea; Lee Seong-won; Park Jang-hun; Roh Sung-min; Lee Hui-chan; Lim Keun-young; Kim Jeong-min; Kim Kyung-tae; Kim Sun-bin; Kim Gun-hee; Soel Tae-su; Shim Je-hyeok; Jeong Han-eul; Lee Woo-seok; Kim Young-gyu; Choi Jae-hun; Seo Myeong-won; Lee Dong-gun; Jeong Chung-geun | North Korea; Kwon Kum-chol; Son Chol-ryong; Ri Ju-yong; Paek Ri-hyok; Ri Nam-jun; Ryo Yu-song; Kim Chong-il; Ro Kwang-yong; Jo Kwang-myong; Ri Jong-hyok; Ha Chol-song; O Chol-hyok; Jang Chol-myong; Kim Kwang-jin; Jo Sol-song; Pak Chung-nam; Jon Chol-jin | Iran; Meisam Labbaf; Arash Esmaeili; Armin Sohrabian; Omid Tavakkoli; Fereydoun Zobeidani; Mohammad Mamashli; Bahman Jahantigh; Milad Sarlak; Reza Mirahmadi; Siavash Haghnazari; Mohammad Ghanbari; Alireza Bohlouli; Amir Reza Ghamnak; Saeid Aghaei; Mehdi Kor; Mehdi Pourdadashvand; Mohsen Gheibi; Mohammad Reza Alikhani |

== Results ==
=== Preliminary round ===
- Host Singapore directly entered the final round.

==== Group A ====
| Pos | Team | Pld | W | D | L | GF | GA | GD | Pts |
|---|---|---|---|---|---|---|---|---|---|
| 1 | Iran | 1 | 1 | 0 | 0 | 6 | 0 | +6 | 3 |
| 2 | Chinese Taipei | 1 | 0 | 0 | 1 | 0 | 6 | −6 | 0 |

Source: Official website
20 June
17:00

| Philippines | Cancelled | Chinese Taipei |

Meridian Junior College, Singapore

22 June
17:00

| Chinese Taipei | 0–6 | Iran |
|---|---|---|
| | | Aghaei 10', 34'; Pourdadashvand 21'; Haghnazari 40'; Sohrabian 45'; Mirahmadi 71' |

Meridian Junior College, Singapore
Referee: Sukhbir Singh (Singapore)

24 June
17:00

| Iran | Cancelled | Philippines |

Meridian Junior College, Singapore
- The Philippines has been withdrawn from the Asian Youth Games Football Competition as they were unable to fulfil their fixtures as scheduled due to their team's quarantine.

==== Group B ====
| Pos | Team | Pld | W | D | L | GF | GA | GD | Pts |
|---|---|---|---|---|---|---|---|---|---|
| 1 | South Korea | 3 | 3 | 0 | 0 | 10 | 3 | +7 | 9 |
| 2 | China | 3 | 1 | 1 | 1 | 9 | 6 | +3 | 4 |
| 3 | Pakistan | 3 | 0 | 2 | 1 | 1 | 3 | −2 | 2 |
| 4 | Myanmar | 3 | 0 | 1 | 2 | 5 | 13 | −8 | 1 |

Source: Official website
20 June
15:00

| South Korea | 2–0 | Pakistan |
|---|---|---|
| Choi Jae-hua 10'; Kim Sun-bin 44' (pen.) |

Temasek Polytechnic, Singapore
Referee: Jeevanathan P. M. (Singapore)

20 June
17:00

| China | 7–3 | Myanmar |
|---|---|---|
| Wang Chengkuai 2', 12'; Liang Xueming 8', 39'; Wang Yiran 55', 63'; Xiao Yufeng 72' | | Htwe Aung Myo 14', 44', 64' |

Temasek Polytechnic, Singapore
Referee: T. Aravinthan (Singapore)

22 June
15:00

| Pakistan | 0–0 | China |

Temasek Polytechnic, Singapore
Referee: Muhd Adzhar (Singapore)

22 June
17:00

| Myanmar | 1–5 | South Korea |
|---|---|---|
| Tun Zaw Win 67' | | Lee Woo-seok 17'; Jeong Chung-geun 22'; Min Arkar 50' (o.g.); Kim Gun-hee 51'; Kim Young-gyu 56' |

Temasek Polytechnic, Singapore
Referee: Zaid Hussein (Singapore)

24 June
17:00

| South Korea | 3–2 | China |
|---|---|---|
| Kim Sun-bin 11'; Lee Hui-chan 37'; Seo Myeong-won 40+1' | | Yan Peng 12'; Xiao Yufeng 80' |

Temasek Polytechnic, Singapore
Referee: Leow Thiam Hoe (Singapore)

24 June
17:00

| Myanmar | 1–1 | Pakistan |
|---|---|---|
| Htwe Aung Myo 22' | | Fahad 80+1' |

Jurong Junior College, Singapore
Referee: W. Ravisanthiran (Singapore)

==== Group C ====
| Pos | Team | Pld | W | D | L | GF | GA | GD | Pts |
|---|---|---|---|---|---|---|---|---|---|
| 1 | Thailand | 2 | 1 | 0 | 1 | 4 | 4 | 0 | 3 |
| 2 | North Korea | 2 | 1 | 0 | 1 | 3 | 3 | 0 | 3 |
| 3 | Malaysia | 2 | 1 | 0 | 1 | 2 | 2 | 0 | 3 |

Source: Official website
20 June
17:00

| North Korea | 3–2 | Thailand |
|---|---|---|
| Ro Kwang-yong 29'; Ri Jong-hyok 66'; Jo Sol-song 69' | | Daochalermwong 61'; Charoenruen 73' |

Victoria Junior College, Singapore
Referee: Sukhbir Singh (Singapore)

22 June
17:00

| Malaysia | 1–0 | North Korea |
|---|---|---|
| Yaakob 38' (pen.) |

Victoria Junior College, Singapore
Referee: Leow Thiam Hoe (Singapore)

24 June
17:00

| Thailand | 2–1 | Malaysia |
|---|---|---|
| Charoenruen 47' (pen.), 58' | | Yaakob 75' |

Victoria Junior College, Singapore
Referee: T. Aravinthan (Singapore)

==== Group D ====
| Pos | Team | Pld | W | D | L | GF | GA | GD | Pts |
|---|---|---|---|---|---|---|---|---|---|
| 1 | Saudi Arabia | 1 | 1 | 0 | 0 | 3 | 1 | +2 | 3 |
| 2 | Laos | 1 | 0 | 0 | 1 | 1 | 3 | −2 | 0 |

Source: Official website
20 June
17:00

| Saudi Arabia | 3–1 | Laos |
|---|---|---|
| Al-Harun 34'; Al-Nakhli 36', 65' | | Souliyamath 52' |

Jurong Junior College, Singapore
Referee: Muhammad Taqi Al-Jaafari (Singapore)

22 June
17:00

| Hong Kong | Cancelled | Saudi Arabia |

Jurong Junior College, Singapore

24 June
17:00

| Laos | Cancelled | Hong Kong |

Jurong Junior College, Singapore
- Hong Kong has been withdrawn from the Asian Youth Games Football Competition as they were unable to fulfil their fixtures as scheduled due to their team's quarantine.

==== Second-placed teams ====
| Pos | Team | Pld | W | D | L | GF | GA | GD | Pts |
|---|---|---|---|---|---|---|---|---|---|
| 1 | China | 3 | 1 | 1 | 1 | 9 | 6 | +3 | 4 |
| 2 | North Korea | 2 | 1 | 0 | 1 | 3 | 3 | 0 | 3 |
| 3 | Laos | 1 | 0 | 0 | 1 | 1 | 3 | −2 | 0 |
| 4 | Chinese Taipei | 1 | 0 | 0 | 1 | 0 | 6 | −6 | 0 |

Source: Official website

=== Final round ===
==== Group A ====
| Pos | Team | Pld | W | D | L | GF | GA | GD | Pts |
|---|---|---|---|---|---|---|---|---|---|
| 1 | Iran | 3 | 3 | 0 | 0 | 10 | 3 | +7 | 9 |
| 2 | China | 3 | 2 | 0 | 1 | 12 | 4 | +8 | 6 |
| 3 | Thailand | 3 | 1 | 0 | 2 | 4 | 12 | −8 | 3 |
| 4 | Singapore | 3 | 0 | 0 | 3 | 2 | 9 | −7 | 0 |

Source: Official website
27 June
17:00

| Iran | 2–1 | Singapore |
|---|---|---|
| Haghnazari 49'; Jahantigh 74' | | Akbar 57' |

Jalan Besar Stadium, Singapore
Referee: Đặng Thanh Hạ (Vietnam)

27 June
19:30

| Thailand | 0–7 | China |
|---|---|---|
| | | Long Cheng 3'; Yan Peng 6', 10', 27', 61', 79'; Liang Xueming 40' |

Jalan Besar Stadium, Singapore
Referee: Sreng Haody (Cambodia)

29 June
16:00

| Singapore | 1–4 | Thailand |
|---|---|---|
| Suhaimi 70' | | Charoenruen 26', 45'; Todsaporn 40'; Komsan 79' |

Jalan Besar Stadium, Singapore
Referee: Đặng Thanh Hạ (Vietnam)

29 June
16:00

| China | 2–4 | Iran |
|---|---|---|
| Zhou Pengcheng 12'; Long Cheng 32' | | Jahantigh 9', 21', 56'; Aghaei 44' |

Temasek Polytechnic, Singapore
Referee: Sreng Haody (Cambodia)

1 July
17:00

| Iran | 4–0 | Thailand |
|---|---|---|
| Sohrabian 5'; Haghnazari 31'; Esmaeili 70'; Aghaei 80+1' |

Temasek Polytechnic, Singapore
Referee: Sreng Haody (Cambodia)

1 July
17:00

| China | 3–0 | Singapore |
|---|---|---|
| Yan Peng 26', 35', 45' |

Jalan Besar Stadium, Singapore
Referee: Sura Sriart (Thailand)

==== Group B ====
| Pos | Team | Pld | W | D | L | GF | GA | GD | Pts |
|---|---|---|---|---|---|---|---|---|---|
| 1 | South Korea | 3 | 3 | 0 | 0 | 16 | 1 | +15 | 9 |
| 2 | North Korea | 3 | 1 | 1 | 1 | 6 | 7 | −1 | 4 |
| 3 | Saudi Arabia | 3 | 1 | 1 | 1 | 6 | 8 | −2 | 4 |
| 4 | Laos | 3 | 0 | 0 | 3 | 4 | 16 | −12 | 0 |

Source: Official website
28 June
17:00

| South Korea | 8–1 | Laos |
|---|---|---|
| Seo Myeong-won 13', 31' (pen.); Jeong Chung-geun 14'; Shim Je-hyeok 18'; Choi Jae-hun 23'; Kim Sun-bin 40'; Kim Gun-hee 49'; Soel Tae-su 61' | | Saysana 59' |

Jalan Besar Stadium, Singapore
Referee: Sukhbir Singh (Singapore)

28 June
19:30

| Saudi Arabia | 2–2 | North Korea |
|---|---|---|
| Al-Dini 12'; Al-Nakhli 44' | | Ro Kwang-yong 70'; Ri Nam-jun 80' |

Jalan Besar Stadium, Singapore
Referee: Shabudin Hadimin (Brunei)

30 June
17:00

| Laos | 1–4 | Saudi Arabia |
|---|---|---|
| Somsanith 37' | | Al-Nakhli 5', 26', 71'; Al-Muwallad 60' |

Jalan Besar Stadium, Singapore
Referee: Sukhbir Singh (Singapore)

30 June
19:30

| North Korea | 0–3 | South Korea |
|---|---|---|
| | | Lee Hui-chan 24', 70'; Seo Myeong-won 36' |

Jalan Besar Stadium, Singapore
Referee: Shabudin Hadimin (Brunei)

2 July
17:00

| South Korea | 5–0 | Saudi Arabia |
|---|---|---|
| Kim Gun-hee 26'; Shim Je-hyeok 32', 72'; Seo Myeong-won 43'; Lim Keun-young 59' |

Jalan Besar Stadium, Singapore
Referee: Shabudin Hadimin (Brunei)

2 July
17:00

| North Korea | 4–2 | Laos |
|---|---|---|
| Jo Sol-song 18', 80+3'; Ri Jong-hyok 48'; Kim Kwang-jin 71' | | Saysana 20'; Sisanon 31' |

Temasek Polytechnic, Singapore
Referee: Sura Sriart (Thailand)

=== Knockout round ===
Semifinals
4 July
Iran | 0
North Korea | 1
4 July
South Korea | 2
China | 0

Final
6 July
North Korea | 0
South Korea | 2
Bronze medal match
6 July
Iran | 2
China | 0

==== Semifinals ====
4 July
17:00

| Iran | 0–1 | North Korea |
|---|---|---|
| | | Ryo Yu-song 74' |

Jalan Besar Stadium, Singapore
Referee: Sreng Haody (Cambodia)

4 July
19:30

| South Korea | 2–0 | China |
|---|---|---|
| Seo Myeong-won 14'; Kim Sun-bin 80+2' (pen.) |

Jalan Besar Stadium, Singapore
Referee: Sukhbir Singh (Singapore)

==== Bronze medal match ====
6 July
17:00

| Iran | 2–0 | China |
|---|---|---|
| Sohrabian 18'; Haghnazari 35' |

Jalan Besar Stadium, Singapore
Referee: Sriart Sura (Thailand)

==== Final ====
6 July
19:30

| North Korea | 0–2 | South Korea |
|---|---|---|
| | | Kim Sun-bin 21'; Kim Young-gyu 50' |

Jalan Besar Stadium, Singapore
Referee: Shabudin Hadimin (Brunei)

== Goalscorers ==
9 goals

- Yan Peng (CHN)

6 goals

- Seo Myeong-won (KOR)
- Mohammed Al-Nakhli (KSA)

5 goals

- Kim Sun-bin (KOR)
- Insiri Charoenruen (THA)

4 goals

- Saeid Aghaei (IRI)
- Bahman Jahantigh (IRI)
- Siavash Haghnazari (IRI)
- Htwe Aung Myo (MYA)

3 goals

- Liang Xueming (CHN)
- Armin Sohrabian (IRI)
- Kim Gun-hee (KOR)
- Lee Hui-chan (KOR)
- Shim Je-hyeok (KOR)
- Jo Sol-song (PRK)

2 goals

- Long Cheng (CHN)
- Wang Chengkuai (CHN)
- Wang Yiran (CHN)
- Xiao Yufeng (CHN)
- Choi Jae-hua (KOR)
- Jeong Chung-geun (KOR)
- Kim Young-gyu (KOR)
- Lembo Saysana (LAO)
- Muhammad Yaakob (MAS)
- Ri Jong-hyok (PRK)
- Ro Kwang-yong (PRK)

1 goal

- Zhou Pengcheng (CHN)
- Arash Esmaeili (IRI)
- Reza Mirahmadi (IRI)
- Mehdi Pourdadashvand (IRI)
- Lee Woo-seok (KOR)
- Lim Keun-young (KOR)
- Soel Tae-su (KOR)
- Waleed Al-Dini (KSA)
- Abdullah Al-Harun (KSA)
- Abdulaziz Al-Muwallad (KSA)
- Keomoukda Sisanon (LAO)
- Souksavanh Somsanith (LAO)
- Thinnakone Souliyamath (LAO)
- Tun Zaw Win (MYA)
- Tariq Fahad (PAK)
- Kim Kwang-jin (PRK)
- Ri Nam-jun (PRK)
- Ryo Yu-song (PRK)
- Hanafi Akbar (SIN)
- Muhaimin Suhaimi (SIN)
- Amphol Daochalermwong (THA)
- Tanomnaew Komsan (THA)
- Ponpai Todsaporn (THA)

1 own goal

- Min Arkar (MYA) (against KOR)
