= Wang Quan (footballer) =

Chinese footballer

Wang Quan 汪泉
Personal information
- Full name: Wang Quan
- Date of birth: 15 February 1989 (age 37)
- Place of birth: Wuhan, Hubei, China
- Height: 1.82 m (6 ft 0 in)
- Position: Midfielder

Youth career
- Zhejiang Green Town

Senior career*
Years	Team	Apps	(Gls)
2007–2009	Hangzhou Sanchao		
2010–2011	Hangzhou Greentown	3	(0)
2012	Hubei China-Kyle	4	(1)
2013–2016	Hebei China Fortune	31	(2)
2017–2020	Hunan Billows	64	(0)
- * Club domestic league appearances and goals as of 31 December 2020

Wang Quan (Chinese: 汪泉; born 15 February 1989) is a Chinese footballer.

== Club career ==
Wang Quan started his professional football career in 2007 for third tier football club Hangzhou Sanchao, a football club formed from the youth team of Zhejiang Greentown. After three seasons with Hangzhou Sanchao he was brought back to Zhejiang Green Town, now renamed Hangzhou Greentown for the 2010 Chinese Super League campaign. On 16 October 2011, he made his debut for Hangzhou in the 2011 Chinese Super League against Jiangsu Sainty.

In March 2012, Wang moved to China League Two club Hubei China-Kyle. In March 2013, he transferred to China League Two side Hebei Zhongji. He would go on to establish himself as a squad player that went on to gain successive promotions Hebei Zhongji as they reached the top tier. In March 2017, Wang transferred to League Two side Hunan Billows.

== Career statistics ==
Statistics accurate as of match played 31 December 2020.

Appearances and goals by club, season and competition
Club	Season	League			National Cup		Continental		Other		Total	
Club	Season	Division	Apps	Goals	Apps	Goals	Apps	Goals	Apps	Goals	Apps	Goals
Hangzhou Sanchao	2007	China League Two	?	?	-		-		-		?	?
Hangzhou Sanchao	2008	China League Two	?	?	-		-		-		?	?
Hangzhou Sanchao	2009	China League Two	?	?	-		-		-		?	?
Hangzhou Sanchao	Total		?	?	0	0	0	0	0	0	?	?
Hangzhou Greentown	2010	Chinese Super League	1	0	-		-		-		1	0
Hangzhou Greentown	2011	Chinese Super League	2	0	0	0	0	0	-		2	0
Hangzhou Greentown	Total		3	0	0	0	0	0	0	0	3	0
Hubei China-Kyle	2012	China League Two	4	1	-		-		-		4	1
Hebei China Fortune	2013	China League Two	8	0	0	0	-		-		0	0
Hebei China Fortune	2014	China League One	5	1	1	0	-		-		6	1
Hebei China Fortune	2015	China League One	16	1	1	0	-		-		17	1
Hebei China Fortune	2016	Chinese Super League	2	0	2	0	-		-		4	0
Hebei China Fortune	Total		31	2	4	0	0	0	0	0	35	2
Hunan Billows	2017	China League Two	17	0	1	0	-		-		18	0
Hunan Billows	2018	China League Two	19	0	1	0	-		-		20	0
Hunan Billows	2019	China League Two	28	0	2	0	-		-		30	0
Hunan Billows	Total		64	0	4	0	0	0	0	0	68	0
Career total			102	3	8	0	0	0	0	0	110	3
