= Song Zhiwei =

Chinese footballer

Song Zhiwei 宋志伟
Personal information
- Date of birth: 19 March 1989 (age 37)
- Place of birth: Dalian, Liaoning, China
- Height: 1.88 m (6 ft 2 in)
- Positions: Defensive midfielder; defender

Youth career
- Dalian Shide
- 2006–2010: Hangzhou Greentown

Senior career*
| Years | Team | Apps | (Gls) |
| 2007–2009 | → Hangzhou Sanchao (loan) | | |
| 2011–2012 | Chongqing FC | 15 | (1) |
| 2013 | Hangzhou Greentown | 15 | (0) |
| 2014–2021 | Wuhan FC | 133 | (2) |
| 2022–2023 | Dalian Pro | 14 | (0) |
| 2023 | Guangxi Pingguo Haliao | 10 | (0) |
| 2024 | Shijiazhuang Gongfu | 24 | (1) |
| 2025 | Dalian K'un City | 22 | (0) |
- * Club domestic league appearances and goals as of 8 March 2026

Song Zhiwei (Chinese: 宋志伟; pinyin: Sòng Zhìwěi; born 19 March 1989 in Dalian) is a Chinese football player.

== Club career ==
Song joined Zhejiang Green Town youth team system from Dalian Shide in 2006. He started his professional football career in 2007 when he was sent to Hangzhou Sanchao (Zhejiang Green Town youth team) for China League Two campaign. In July 2007, he moved to Portuguese side S.L. Benfica for a brief trial. He made a free transfer to League Two side Chongqing F.C. in 2011. He scored his first goal for Chongqing on 25 June 2011, in a 2–2 draw against Guangdong Youth. He made 14 appearances as Chongqing won promotion to the second tier at the end of the 2011 season. Due to lingering injury, he played just one league match and one FA Cup match in the 2012 season. In January 2013, Song moved back to Hangzhou Greentown on a free transfer. On 25 May 2013, he made his Super League debut in a 1–0 home defeat against Guangzhou Evergrande.

On 9 January 2014, Song transferred to China League One side Wuhan Zall with a fee of ¥600,000. He would be an integral member of the team and help gain promotion with them to the top tier by winning the 2018 China League One division. After being an integral member of the team that helped the club establish themselves as a top-tier club he would leave the team on 21 April 2022 to join another top-tier club Dalian Professional for the start of the 2022 Chinese Super League season. He made his debut in a league game on 16 June 2022 against Zhejiang Professional in a match that ended in a 1–1 draw.

== Career statistics ==
Statistics accurate as of match played 31 December 2020.

Appearances and goals by club, season and competition
| Club | Season | League | | | National Cup | | Continental | | Other | | Total | |
| Club | Season | Division | Apps | Goals | Apps | Goals | Apps | Goals | Apps | Goals | Apps | Goals |
|---|---|---|---|---|---|---|---|---|---|---|---|---|
| Hangzhou Sanchao (loan) | 2007 | China League Two | | | - | | - | | - | | | |
| Hangzhou Sanchao (loan) | 2008 | China League Two | | | - | | - | | - | | | |
| Hangzhou Sanchao (loan) | 2009 | China League Two | | | - | | - | | - | | | |
| Hangzhou Sanchao (loan) | Total | | | | 0 | 0 | 0 | 0 | 0 | 0 | | |
| Chongqing F.C. | 2011 | China League Two | 14 | 1 | - | | - | | - | | 14 | 1 |
| Chongqing F.C. | 2012 | China League One | 1 | 0 | 1 | 0 | - | | - | | 2 | 0 |
| Chongqing F.C. | Total | | 15 | 1 | 1 | 0 | 0 | 0 | 0 | 0 | 16 | 1 |
| Hangzhou Greentown | 2013 | Chinese Super League | 15 | 0 | 2 | 0 | - | | - | | 17 | 0 |
| Wuhan Zall | 2014 | China League One | 29 | 2 | 0 | 0 | - | | - | | 29 | 2 |
| Wuhan Zall | 2015 | China League One | 22 | 0 | 0 | 0 | - | | - | | 22 | 0 |
| Wuhan Zall | 2016 | China League One | 22 | 0 | 0 | 0 | - | | - | | 22 | 0 |
| Wuhan Zall | 2017 | China League One | 17 | 0 | 1 | 0 | - | | - | | 18 | 0 |
| Wuhan Zall | 2018 | China League One | 14 | 0 | 2 | 1 | - | | - | | 16 | 1 |
| Wuhan Zall | 2019 | Chinese Super League | 23 | 1 | 1 | 0 | - | | - | | 24 | 1 |
| Wuhan Zall | 2020 | Chinese Super League | 17 | 0 | 0 | 0 | - | | 0 (Note: Appearance(s) in Promotion/Relegation Play-offs) | 0 | 17 | 0 |
| Wuhan Zall | 2021 | Chinese Super League | 0 | 0 | 0 | 0 | - | | - | | 0 | 0 |
| Wuhan Zall | Total | | 144 | 3 | 4 | 1 | 0 | 0 | 0 | 0 | 148 | 4 |
| Dalian Professional | 2022 | Chinese Super League | 14 | 0 | 0 | 0 | - | | - | | 14 | 0 |
| Career total | | | 188 | 4 | 7 | 1 | 0 | 0 | 0 | 0 | 195 | 4 |

== Honours ==
=== Club ===
Wuhan Zall

- China League One: 2018
