= Lin Longchang =

Chinese footballer

Lin Longchang 林隆昌
Personal information
- Full name: Lin Longchang
- Date of birth: 24 February 1990 (age 36)
- Place of birth: Dalian, Liaoning, China
- Height: 1.87 m (6 ft 2 in)
- Position: Centre-back

Team information
- Current team: Dalian K'un City
- Number: 5

Youth career
- 2005–2006: Dalian Shide

Senior career*
Years	Team	Apps	(Gls)
2007–2010	Hangzhou Sanchao		
2011–2021	Guizhou Zhicheng	206	(3)
2022–2023	Dalian Professional	41	(0)
2024	Liaoning Tieren	26	(0)
2025–	Dalian K'un City	21	(0)
- * Club domestic league appearances and goals as of 18 January 2024

Lin Longchang (Chinese: 林隆昌; born 24 February 1990) is a Chinese professional footballer who plays as a centre-back for Dalian K'un City.

== Club career ==
Lin Longchang started his professional football career in 2007 when he joined Hangzhou Sanchao for the 2007 China League Two campaign. In March 2011, Lin transferred to China League One side Guizhou Zhicheng. While he would go on to establish himself as a regular within the team, the club would experience eccentric results with two relegations and two promotions until the 2016 season as Guizhou Zhicheng finished runners-up of the league and gaining promotion to Chinese Super League. On 13 May 2017, he made his Super League debut in a 2–1 home win over Tianjin Quanjian, coming on as a substitute for Nikica Jelavić in the 94th minute.

The following season, Lin would unfortunately be part of the team that was relegated at the end of the 2018 Chinese Super League campaign. He would remain loyal towards the club and despite being an integral member of the team that came third within the league in the 2019 China League One campaign, it was not enough as the club narrowly missed out on promotion. At the end of the 2021 China League One campaign, the club was dissolved due to financial difficulties. On 21 April 2022, Lin would join top-tier club Dalian Professional on a free transfer. He would go on to make his debut in a league game on 4 June 2022 against Henan Songshan Longmen F.C. in a 2–2 draw.

== Career statistics ==
Statistics accurate as of match played 31 December 2022.

Appearances and goals by club, season and competition
Club	Season	League			National Cup		Continental		Other		Total	
Club	Season	Division	Apps	Goals	Apps	Goals	Apps	Goals	Apps	Goals	Apps	Goals
Hangzhou Sanchao	2007	China League Two			-		-		-			
Hangzhou Sanchao	2008	China League Two			-		-		-			
Hangzhou Sanchao	2009	China League Two			-		-		-			
Hangzhou Sanchao	Total				0	0	0	0	0	0		
Guizhou Hengfeng	2011	China League One	17	0	1	0	-		-		18	0
Guizhou Hengfeng	2012	China League Two	26	0	0	0	-		-		26	0
Guizhou Hengfeng	2013	China League One	16	0	0	0	-		-		16	0
Guizhou Hengfeng	2014	China League Two	18	1	0	0	-		-		18	1
Guizhou Hengfeng	2015	China League One	22	1	1	0	-		-		23	1
Guizhou Hengfeng	2016	China League One	22	0	0	0	-		-		22	0
Guizhou Hengfeng	2017	Chinese Super League	6	0	1	0	-		-		7	0
Guizhou Hengfeng	2018	Chinese Super League	8	1	2	0	-		-		10	1
Guizhou Hengfeng	2019	China League One	30	0	0	0	-		-		30	0
Guizhou Hengfeng	2020	China League One	13	1	1	0	-		-		14	1
Guizhou Hengfeng	2021	China League One	28	0	0	0	-		-		28	0
Guizhou Hengfeng	Total		206	4	6	0	0	0	0	0	212	4
Dalian Professional	2022	Chinese Super League	24	0	1	0	-		-		25	0
Career total			230	4	7	0	0	0	0	0	237	4

== Honours ==
=== Club ===
Guizhou Zhicheng

- China League Two: 2012.
