= Zhang Xiao (footballer) =

Chinese footballer (born 1988)

Zhang Xiao 张校
Personal information
- Full name: Zhang Xiao
- Birth name: Yang Zi
- Date of birth: 6 August 1988 (age 38)
- Place of birth: Shenyang, Liaoning, China
- Height: 1.93 m (6 ft 4 in)
- Position: Forward

Team information
- Current team: Zibo Cuju

Youth career
- 2000–2009: Zhejiang Green Town

Senior career*
Years	Team	Apps	(Gls)
2007–2009	Hangzhou Sanchao	?	(?)
2010–2013	Hangzhou Greentown	20	(2)
2014	Shenyang Zhongze	15	(2)
2015	Harbin Yiteng	2	(0)
2016	Lijiang Jiayunhao	17	(8)
2017	Shenzhen Ledman	24	(13)
2018–2019	Sichuan Longfor	21	(6)
2019–2020	Chengdu Better City	16	(1)
2021	Chongqing Liangjiang Athletic	12	(1)
2022-	Zibo Cuju	0	(0)
- * Club domestic league appearances and goals as of 27 April 2022

Zhang Xiao (Chinese: 张校; pinyin: Zhāng Xiào; born 6 August 1988 in Shenyang), previously known as Yang Zi (杨子; Yáng Zǐ), is a Chinese footballer who currently plays as a forward for Zibo Cuju.

== Club career ==
Yang joined Zhejiang Green Town youth team system in 2000. He started his professional football career in 2007 when he was sent to China League Two side Hangzhou Sanchao (Zhejiang Greentown Youth) and played as a regular center forward for the team. Yang was promoted to Hangzhou Greentown's first team squad by Wu Jingui in 2010. On 22 May, he made his Super League debut in a 2–1 home victory against Jiangsu Sainty, coming on as a substitute for Tan Yang in the 52nd minute. In the 2011 league season, he didn't have too much chance to play for the first team and mainly appeared in the reserve team league. In the last four round of the season, he became the regular start forward of the club, replacing Luis Ramírez. On 11 August, Yang scored his first and second league goal for Hangzhou Greentown, however, Hangzhou eventually lost to Guangzhou Evergrande 3–2. His performance was highly appreciated by Takeshi Okada and Marcello Lippi, managers of the two sides. In early September, he suffered a metatarsal fracture in his right foot in the training, ruling him out for the rest of the season. Yang returned to field in 2013 but could just play four matches for the club in the 2013 season.

In February 2014, Yang transferred to China League One side Shenyang Zhongze. He signed a contract with League One side Harbin Yiteng on 16 July 2015.

In March 2016, Yang transferred to China League Two club Lijiang Jiayunhao. On 23 January 2017, Yang moved to League Two side Shenzhen Ledman. He scored 13 goals in 27 appearances in the 2017 season. After failing to extended his contract with the club, Yang became an unattached player in the end of 2017. Yang joined fellow China League Two club Sichuan Longfor on 28 June 2018.

On 30 July 2021 he transferred to top tier club in Chongqing Liangjiang Athletic. He made his debut in a league game against Cangzhou Mighty Lions F.C. on 30 July 2021 in a 1-1 draw where he came on as a substitute for Dostonbek Tursunov and scored his first goal for the club.

== Career statistics ==
Statistics accurate as of match played 1 August 2021.

Appearances and goals by club, season and competition
Club	Season	League			National Cup		Continental		Other		Total	
Club	Season	Division	Apps	Goals	Apps	Goals	Apps	Goals	Apps	Goals	Apps	Goals
Hangzhou Sanchao	2007	China League Two			-		-		-			
Hangzhou Sanchao	2008	China League Two			-		-		-			
Hangzhou Sanchao	2009	China League Two			-		-		-			
Hangzhou Sanchao	Total		0	0	0	0	0	0	0	0	0	0
Hangzhou Greentown	2010	Chinese Super League	2	0	-		-		-		2	0
Hangzhou Greentown	2011	Chinese Super League	5	0	0	0	0	0	-		5	0
Hangzhou Greentown	2012	Chinese Super League	9	2	2	0	-		-		11	2
Hangzhou Greentown	2013	Chinese Super League	4	0	0	0	-		-		4	0
Hangzhou Greentown	Total		20	2	2	0	0	0	0	0	22	2
Shenyang Zhongze	2014	China League One	21	3	2	2	-		-		23	5
Harbin Yiteng	2015	China League One	2	0	0	0	-		-		2	0
Lijiang Jiayunhao	2016	China League Two	17	8	3	0	-		-		20	8
Shenzhen Ledman	2017	China League Two	24	13	2	0	-		-		26	13
Sichuan Longfor	2018	China League Two	13	6	0	0	-		-		13	6
Sichuan Longfor	2019	China League One	8	0	1	0	-		-		9	0
Sichuan Longfor	Total		21	6	1	0	0	0	0	0	22	6
Chengdu Better City	2019	China League Two	13	1	0	0	-		-		13	1
Chengdu Better City	2020	China League One	3	0	0	0	-		-		3	0
Chengdu Better City	Total		16	1	0	0	0	0	0	0	16	1
Chongqing Liangjiang Athletic	2021	Chinese Super League	1	1	0	0	–		–		1	1
Career total			122	34	10	2	0	0	0	0	132	36
