= Yang Shaobo =

Chinese association football player

Personal information
- Date of birth: 20 May 2000 (age 26)
- Position: Midfielder

Team information
- Current team: Beijing BSU
- Number: 45

Youth career
- Atlético Madrid
- Beijing BSU

Senior career*
Years	Team	Apps	(Gls)
2021–	Beijing BSU	0	(0)
- * Club domestic league appearances and goals as of 14:01, 24 August 2021 (UTC)

Yang Shaobo (Chinese: 杨绍博; born 20 May 2000) is a Chinese footballer currently playing as a midfielder for Beijing BSU.

== Career statistics ==
=== Club ===
As of 24 August 2021.

Club	Season	League			Cup		Other		Total	
Club	Season	Division	Apps	Goals	Apps	Goals	Apps	Goals	Apps	Goals
Beijing BSU	2021	China League One	0	0	1 (Note: Appearances in the Chinese FA Cup)	0	0	0	1	0
Career total			0	0	1	0	0	0	1	0
