= Long Cheng (footballer) =

Chinese footballer

Long Cheng 龙成
Personal information
- Date of birth: 22 March 1995 (age 31)
- Place of birth: Yueyang, Hunan, China
- Height: 1.86 m (6 ft 1 in)
- Position: Defender

Team information
- Current team: Zhejiang FC

Youth career
- Qingdao Inter Campus
- Luneng Taishan Football School
- 2008–2013: Wuhan Zall
- 2011–2012: → Liverpool (loan)
- 2013: → Paços de Ferreira (loan)

Senior career*
Years	Team	Apps	(Gls)
2014–2015	Wuhan Zall	1	(0)
2015–2019	Henan Jianye	66	(0)
2019	Jiangsu Suning	1	(0)
2020–	Zhejiang FC	13	(0)
2021	→ Sichuan Jiuniu (Loan)	3	(0)

International career^{‡}
2014	China U-19	4	(0)
2016–2018	China U-23	10	(0)
- * Club domestic league appearances and goals as of 31 January 2023 ‡ National team caps and goals as of 19 August 2018

Long Cheng (Chinese: 龙成; born 22 March 1995 in Yueyang) is a Chinese professional football player who currently plays as a defender for Zhejiang FC.

== Club career ==
In 2014, Long Cheng started his professional footballer career with Wuhan Zall in the China League One. On 10 July 2015, Long transferred to Chinese Super League side Henan Jianye. On 11 July 2015, Long made his debut for Henan in the 2015 Chinese Super League against Chongqing Lifan, coming on as a substitute for Yin Hongbo in the 90th minute. He would go on to establish himself as a regular within the squad until the emergence of Han Xuan and Chen Hao saw him allowed to leave the club for Jiangsu Suning on 27 July 2019.

On 27 February 2020, Long transferred to second tier football club Zhejiang Greentown. He would go on to make his debut for the club on 12 September 2020 in a league game against Guizhou Hengfeng that ended in a 1-1 draw. After only one season he would loaned out to another second tier club in Sichuan Jiuniu on 31 July 2021. On his return to Zhejiang he would be moved to the reserve squad.

== Career statistics ==
Statistics accurate as of match played 31 January 2023.

Appearances and goals by club, season and competition
Club	Season	League			National Cup		Continental		Other		Total	
Club	Season	Division	Apps	Goals	Apps	Goals	Apps	Goals	Apps	Goals	Apps	Goals
Wuhan Zall	2014	China League One	1	0	1	0	-		-		2	0
Wuhan Zall	2015	China League One	0	0	1	0	-		-		1	0
Wuhan Zall	Total		1	0	2	0	0	0	0	0	3	0
Henan Jianye	2015	Chinese Super League	13	0	1	0	-		-		14	0
Henan Jianye	2016	Chinese Super League	8	0	3	0	-		-		11	0
Henan Jianye	2017	Chinese Super League	27	0	2	0	-		-		29	0
Henan Jianye	2018	Chinese Super League	18	0	1	0	-		-		19	0
Henan Jianye	Total		66	0	7	0	0	0	0	0	73	0
Jiangsu Suning	2019	Chinese Super League	1	0	0	0	-		-		1	0
Zhejiang Greentown	2020	China League One	13	0	1	0	-		2 (Note: Appearances in Promotion/Relegation Play-offs)	0	16	0
Zhejiang Greentown	2021	China League One	0	0	0	0	-		0	0	0	0
Zhejiang Greentown	Total		13	0	1	0	0	0	2	0	16	0
Sichuan Jiuniu (Loan)	2021	China League One	3	0	2	0	-		-		5	0
Career total			84	0	12	0	0	0	2	0	98	0
