= Han Xuan (footballer, born 1991) =

Chinese footballer

Han Xuan 韩轩
Personal information
- Full name: Han Xuan
- Date of birth: 2 February 1991 (age 35)
- Place of birth: Wuhan, Hubei, China
- Height: 1.89 m (6 ft 2 in)
- Position: Centre-back

Senior career*
Years	Team	Apps	(Gls)
2009–2015	Beijing Baxy	101	(2)
2016	Yanbian Funde	0	(0)
2017	Beijing Renhe	2	(0)
2018–2020	Henan Jianye	35	(1)
2021–2023	Chengdu Rongcheng	13	(0)
2022	→ Shaanxi Chang'an Athletic (loan)	7	(0)
2023	→ Nanjing City (loan)	7	(0)
- * Club domestic league appearances and goals as of 8 January 2023

Han Xuan (Chinese: 韩轩; born 2 February 1991), is a Chinese footballer who plays as a centre-back.

== Club career ==
Han Xuan started his professional football career in 2009 when he joined Beijing Baxy for the 2009 China League Two campaign. On 2 January 2016, Han transferred to Chinese Super League side Yanbian Funde. On 28 February 2017, Han transferred to China League One side Beijing Renhe.

On 27 February 2018, Han transferred to Chinese Super League side Henan Jianye. He made his Super League debut on 18 August 2018 in a 2–1 away defeat against Dalian Yifang, coming on as a substitute for Zhong Jinbao in the 90th minute. After three seasons he transferred to second tier club Chengdu Rongcheng where he would establish himself as a regular within the team as he aided them to promotion at the end of the 2021 league campaign.

== Career statistics ==
Statistics accurate as of match played 8 January 2023.

Appearances and goals by club, season and competition
Club	Season	League			National Cup		Continental		Other		Total	
Club	Season	Division	Apps	Goals	Apps	Goals	Apps	Goals	Apps	Goals	Apps	Goals
Beijing Baxy	2009	China League Two			-		-		-			
Beijing Baxy	2010	China League One	6	0	-		-		-		6	0
Beijing Baxy	2011	China League One	4	0	1	0	-		-		5	0
Beijing Baxy	2012	China League One	19	0	0	0	-		-		19	0
Beijing Baxy	2013	China League One	28	1	0	0	-		-		28	1
Beijing Baxy	2014	China League One	27	1	1	0	-		-		28	1
Beijing Baxy	2015	China League One	17	0	5	0	-		-		22	0
Beijing Baxy	Total		101	2	7	0	0	0	0	0	108	2
Yanbian Funde	2016	Chinese Super League	0	0	1	0	-		-		1	0
Beijing Renhe	2017	China League One	2	0	2	0	-		-		4	0
Henan Jianye	2018	Chinese Super League	7	0	1	0	-		-		8	0
Henan Jianye	2019	Chinese Super League	22	1	0	0	-		-		22	1
Henan Jianye	2020	Chinese Super League	6	0	0	0	-		-		6	1
Henan Jianye	Total		35	1	1	0	0	0	0	0	36	1
Chengdu Rongcheng	2021	China League One	10	0	3	0	-		0 (Note: Appearance(s) in CSL Relegation play-offs)	0	13	0
Chengdu Rongcheng	2022	Chinese Super League	0	0	3	0	-		-		3	0
Chengdu Rongcheng	Total		10	0	6	0	0	0	0	0	16	0
Shaanxi Chang'an Athletic (loan)	2022	China League One	7	0	0	0	-		-		7	0
Career total			155	3	17	0	0	0	0	0	172	3
