= Wang Chengkuai =

Chinese footballer (born 1995)

Wang Chengkuai 王成快
Personal information
- Date of birth: 23 January 1995 (age 31)
- Place of birth: Wenzhou, Zhejiang, China
- Height: 1.87 m (6 ft 2 in)
- Position: Midfielder

Youth career
- 2010–2012: Dalian Shide
- 2012–2013: Ajax

Senior career*
Years	Team	Apps	(Gls)
2013	Liaoning Youth	0	(0)
2013–2014	Jong Ajax	2	(0)
2014–2015	Coimbrões	7	(0)
2015–2016	Gondomar	9	(0)
2016–2023	Shenzhen FC	12	(2)
2021	→ Zibo Cuju (loan)	30	(5)
2022	→ Cangzhou Mighty Lions (loan)	0	(0)
2022	→ Zibo Cuju (loan)	11	(1)
2023–2024	Yanbian Longding	27	(2)
2025	Dalian Yingbo	0	(0)
2025	Yanbian Longding	4	(0)

International career
2009	China U14	8	(2)
Medal record
Bronze medal – third place	All China Games	2009
- * Club domestic league appearances and goals as of 22:21, 1 February 2023 (UTC)

Wang Chengkuai (Chinese: 王成快; pinyin: Wáng Chéngkuài; born 23 January 1995) is a Chinese professional footballer who plays as a midfielder.

== Club career ==
=== Early career ===
Wang previously played for two regional football academies before joining the youth ranks of Chinese club Dalian Shide in 2010 after he received his first international call up for the Chinese national under-14 team in 2009. In his last year with the club, he was listed as a reserve and was given the number 52 shirt. However, Dalian Shide folded by the end of the 2012 season and Wang's contract with the club was terminated.

=== Ajax ===
On 17 December 2012, Wang flew to Amsterdam for a trial with Dutch club Ajax. Along with Wei Shihao, another Chinese footballer from the ranks of Shandong Luneng Taishan, the two were recommended by former Ajax coach and talent scout Henk ten Cate who was working for Shandong Luneng Taishan at the time. While Wei was unable to make his flight due to complications with his passport, Wang had a successful trial and committed to a two-year deal on 1 September 2013, becoming the first Chinese footballer to sign with Ajax. (Note: Second Chinese footballer to sign for Ajax if you count Tschen La Ling who was a Dutch footballer of Chinese descent.) On 11 November 2013, he made his professional debut starting for the reserves team Jong Ajax in a 1–2 loss to De Graafschap in the Eerste Divisie, before being substituted off for Branco van den Boomen in the 63rd minute.

=== Portugal ===
On 19 August 2014, Wang signed for Portuguese club Coimbrões. He made seven league appearances for the club, as well as one appearance in the Taça de Portugal during his first season in Portugal.

On 15 July 2015 it was announced that Wang had transferred to Gondomar S.C., remaining in the Portuguese Second Division. He made his debut for his new team on 23 August 2015, coming on as a substitute for Belinha in the 86th minute of the 3–0 win at home against SC Vila Real.

=== Shenzhen FC ===
On 9 July 2016, Wang transferred to China League One side Shenzhen FC He would make his debut in a league game on 14 August 2016 against Tianjin Quanjian in a 5-2 defeat. He would be a squad player as the club gained promotion to the top tier at the end of the 2018 China League One campaign. In the following campaign he would go on to score his first goal for the club on 26 October 2019 against Wuhan Zall in a 4-4 draw. While he was given a run of games throughout the season he would be part of the squad that finished in the relegation zone, however the club was given a reprieve after fellow top tier club Tianjin Tianhai was dissolved after the 2019 season. In the next campaign, Wang would not feature in any senior matches.

On 9 April 2021, Wang would be loaned out to second tier club Zibo Cuju for the 2021 China League One campaign. He would go on to make his debut in a league game on 29 April 2021 against Xinjiang Tianshan Leopard F.C. in a 3-2 defeat. Wang would go on to establish himself as an integral member of the team and go on to score his first goal for the club in a league game on 20 May 2021 against Zhejiang Professional F.C. in a 2-1 defeat. On his return to Shenzhen he would be loaned out again, this time to top tier club Cangzhou Mighty Lions on 29 April 2022. He would struggle to gain any playing time at Cangzhou and would join Zibo Cuju on loan for a second time for the remainder of the season.

=== Dalian Yingbo ===
On 19 January 2025, Wang joined Chinese Super League club Dalian Yingbo.

== International career ==
Wang was called up for the China under-14 squad to participate in the 2009 Asian Youth Games in Singapore. He made his debut on 20 June 2009 in the opening Group B match of the Preliminary round against Myanmar, and scored in the 2nd and 12th minutes of the game, helping his side to a 7–3 victory. He played in the remaining fixtures of the tournament, losing 2–0 to Iran in their final match to place fourth at the tournament. That same year he also competed for his regional team, Liaoning in the 2009 National Games of China, finishing in third place of the under-16 competition.

== Career statistics ==
As of 1 February 2023

Appearances and goals by club, season and competition
Club	Season	League			National cup		Continental		Other		Total	
Club	Season	Division	Apps	Goals	Apps	Goals	Apps	Goals	Apps	Goals	Apps	Goals
Liaoning Youth	2013	China League Two	0	0	0	0	–		–		0	0
Jong Ajax	2013–14	Eerste Divisie	2	0	—		—		–		2	0
SC Coimbrões	2014–15	Campeonato Nacional	7	0	1	0	0	0	–		8	0
Gondomar	2015–16	Campeonato Nacional	9	0	1	0	0	0	–		10	0
Shenzhen FC	2016	China League One	4	0	0	0	–		–		4	0
Shenzhen FC	2017	China League One	0	0	2	0	–		–		2	0
Shenzhen FC	2018	China League One	3	0	1	0	–		–		4	0
Shenzhen FC	2019	Chinese Super League	4	2	0	0	–		–		4	2
Shenzhen FC	2020	Chinese Super League	0	0	0	0	–		–		0	0
Shenzhen FC	Total		11	2	3	0	0	0	0	0	14	2
Zibo Cuju (loan)	2021	China League One	30	5	1	2	–		–		31	7
Cangzhou Mighty Lions (loan)	2022	Chinese Super League	0	0	0	0	–		–		0	0
Zibo Cuju (loan)	2022	China League One	11	1	1	0	–		–		12	1
Career total			70	8	7	2	0	0	0	0	77	10
