= Yan Peng (footballer) =

Chinese footballer

Yan Peng 闫鹏
Personal information
- Date of birth: 27 May 1995 (age 31)
- Place of birth: Anshan, Liaoning, China
- Height: 1.80 m (5 ft 11 in)
- Position: Forward

Team information
- Current team: Dalian K'un City
- Number: 9

Youth career
- 2008–2012: Dalian Shide
- 2013–2016: Dalian Aerbin

Senior career*
Years	Team	Apps	(Gls)
2013	Liaoning Youth	6	(1)
2016–2018	Dalian Yifang	7	(0)
2016	→ Shenyang Urban (loan)	18	(9)
2019	Shenzhen Pengcheng	14	(3)
2020–2021	Heilongjiang Lava Spring	25	(6)
2022–2025	Dalian Yingbo	45	(8)
2026–	Dalian K'un City	0	(0)
- * Club domestic league appearances and goals as of 26 August 2025

Yan Peng (Chinese: 闫鹏; pinyin: Yán Péng; born 27 May 1995) is a Chinese footballer who currently plays for Dalian K'un City.

== Club career ==
Yan Peng joined Dalian Aerbin's youth academy in 2013 after Dalian Shide's dissolve. He was then loaned to China League Two side Liaoning Youth. On 12 May 2013, he scored his first senior goal in a 3–3 home draw with Shenyang Dongjin. In 2016, Yan was loaned to China League Two club Shenyang Urban for one season. On 23 April 2016, he made his debut in a 0–0 away draw against Baoding Yingli ETS, coming on as a substitute for Yang Jian in the half time. On 30 April 2016, he scored his first goal for the club in a 2–0 home win over Shenyang Dongjin. He scored 9 goals in 18 appearances in the 2016 season.

Yan returned to Dalian Yifang in 2017 and was promoted to the first team. On 20 April 2017, he made his debut for the club in a 2017 Chinese FA Cup match against Jiangsu Yancheng Dingli. He did not play in the league match and followed the club promote back to the Chinese Super League. He made his Super League debut on 14 April 2018 in a 2–0 away defeat to Shandong Luneng Taishan, coming on for Zhu Ting in the 77th minute.

On 14 February 2026, Liu joined China League One club Dalian K'un City.

== Career statistics ==
As of 1 September 2024

Appearances and goals by club, season and competition
Club	Season	League			National Cup		Continental		Other		Total	
Club	Season	Division	Apps	Goals	Apps	Goals	Apps	Goals	Apps	Goals	Apps	Goals
Liaoning Youth	2013	China League Two	6	1	-		-		-		6	1
Dalian Yifang	2016	China League One	0	0	0	0	-		-		0	0
Dalian Yifang	2017	China League One	0	0	2	0	-		-		2	0
Dalian Yifang	2018	Chinese Super League	7	0	4	0	-		-		11	0
Dalian Yifang	Total		7	0	6	0	0	0	0	0	13	0
Shenyang Urban (loan)	2016	China League Two	18	9	0	0	-		-		18	9
Shenzhen Pengcheng	2019	China League Two	14	3	3	0	-		-		17	3
Heilongjiang Lava Spring	2020	China League One	5	0	-		-		0 (Note: Appearances in Promotion/Relegation play-offs)	0	5	0
Heilongjiang Lava Spring	2021	China League One	20	6	0	0	-		-		20	6
Heilongjiang Lava Spring	Total		25	6	0	0	0	0	0	0	25	6
Dalian Yingbo	2022	Chinese Champions League	-		-		-		-		-	
Dalian Yingbo	2023	China League Two	21	5	2	0	-		-		23	5
Dalian Yingbo	2024	China League One	16	3	1	1	-		-		17	4
Dalian Yingbo	Total		37	8	3	1	0	0	0	0	40	9
Career total			107	27	12	1	0	0	0	0	119	28

== Honours ==
=== Club ===
Dalian Yifang

- China League One: 2017
