= Seo Myeong-won =

South Korean footballer

Seo Myeong-Won
Personal information
- Full name: Seo Myeong-Won
- Date of birth: 19 April 1995 (age 31)
- Place of birth: Dangjin, South Korea
- Height: 1.80 m (5 ft 11 in)
- Position: Forward

Team information
- Current team: Jeonnam Dragons

Youth career
- 2009–2010: Portsmouth
- 2011–2013: Shinpyeong High School

Senior career*
Years	Team	Apps	(Gls)
2014–2015	Daejeon Citizen	50	(9)
2016–2017	Ulsan Hyundai	10	(0)
2018–2019	Gangwon FC	5	(0)
2020	Bucheon FC 1995	9	(0)
2021–	Jeonnam Dragons	5	(0)

International career
2011	South Korea U-17	2	(0)
2012–	South Korea U-20	6	(1)
- * Club domestic league appearances and goals as of 18 July 2021

Seo Myeong-Won (Korean: 서명원; born 19 April 1995) is a South Korean footballer who plays as a forward for Jeonnam Dragons.

== Career ==
He signed with Daejeon Citizen in 2014. He made his debut in the league match against Suwon FC and his debut goal next match against Goyang Hi FC.
