= Ke Zhao (footballer) =

Chinese footballer

Ke Zhao 柯钊
Personal information
- Date of birth: 25 March 1989 (age 37)
- Place of birth: Huangshi, Hubei, China
- Height: 1.73 m (5 ft 8 in)
- Position: Left-back

Team information
- Current team: Hubei Istar
- Number: 26

Youth career
- 2008: Wuhan Optics Valley

Senior career*
Years	Team	Apps	(Gls)
2009–2016	Wuhan Zall	165	(2)
2017–2024	Henan FC	135	(4)
2025-	Hubei Istar	0	(0)
- * Club domestic league appearances and goals as of 31 December 2022

Ke Zhao (Chinese: 柯钊; born 25 March 1989, in Huangshi) is a Chinese footballer who plays for China League Two club Hubei Istar as a right-footed left-back.

== Club career ==
Ke Zhao would play for the Wuhan Optics Valley youth team before being selected to represent Hubei in football at the 2009 National Games of China. When he returned from the tournament, his club had been disbanded for their on-field behaviour by the Chinese FA. A Phoenix club established by the Hubei Province soccer association would offer Ke the chance to join their new club called Hubei Luyin and play in the third tier. He would start his professional career in the 2009 China League Two campaign and in his, as well as the club's, debut season, and go on to win promotion from the division.

At the now renamed Wuhan Zall, Ke would establish himself as a vital member of the team's defense and go on to win promotion to the top-tier with the club at the end of the 2012 campaign. He would make his Chinese Super League debut for Wuhan on 8 March 2013, in a game against Jiangsu Sainty that ended in a 2-1 defeat. His following game on 16 March 2013 against Beijing Guoan ended in a 1-0 defeat and Ke was given a yellow-card-violation for a tough-tackle against Darko Matić before the referee blew the whistle to end the game. However, the Chinese FA would retroactively impose a four-game ban and a fine of 20,000 Yuan for the incident.

On 24 January 2017, Ke moved to the Super League side Henan Jianye (now known as Henan). On 5 March 2017, he made his debut for Henan in a 0–0 home draw against Hebei China Fortune. This would be followed by his first goal for the club on 28 May 2017 in a league game against Shandong Luneng Taishan in a 3-2 defeat.

== Career statistics ==
Statistics accurate as of match played 31 December 2022.

Appearances and goals by club, season and competition
Club	Season	League			National Cup		Continental		Other		Total	
Club	Season	Division	Apps	Goals	Apps	Goals	Apps	Goals	Apps	Goals	Apps	Goals
Wuhan Zall	2009	China League Two			-		-		-			
Wuhan Zall	2010	China League One	22	2	-		-		-		22	2
Wuhan Zall	2011	China League One	24	0	0	0	-		-		24	0
Wuhan Zall	2012	China League One	22	0	1	0	-		-		23	0
Wuhan Zall	2013	Chinese Super League	23	0	0	0	-		-		23	0
Wuhan Zall	2014	China League One	28	0	0	0	-		-		28	0
Wuhan Zall	2015	China League One	26	0	0	0	-		-		26	0
Wuhan Zall	2016	China League One	20	0	0	0	-		-		20	0
Wuhan Zall	Total		165	2	1	0	0	0	0	0	166	2
Henan Jianye/ Henan Songshan Longmen/ Henan FC	2017	Chinese Super League	27	1	1	0	-		-		28	1
Henan Jianye/ Henan Songshan Longmen/ Henan FC	2018	Chinese Super League	19	0	0	0	-		-		19	0
Henan Jianye/ Henan Songshan Longmen/ Henan FC	2019	Chinese Super League	10	0	0	0	-		-		10	0
Henan Jianye/ Henan Songshan Longmen/ Henan FC	2020	Chinese Super League	10	1	0	0	-		-		10	1
Henan Jianye/ Henan Songshan Longmen/ Henan FC	2021	Chinese Super League	16	1	6	0	-		-		22	1
Henan Jianye/ Henan Songshan Longmen/ Henan FC	2022	Chinese Super League	15	1	1	0	-		-		16	1
Henan Jianye/ Henan Songshan Longmen/ Henan FC	2023	Chinese Super League	0	0	0	0	-		-		0	0
Henan Jianye/ Henan Songshan Longmen/ Henan FC	Total		97	4	8	0	0	0	0	0	105	4
Career total			262	6	9	0	0	0	0	0	271	6
