= Bahman Jahantigh =

Footballer

Personal information
- Date of birth: 14 March 1995 (age 31)
- Place of birth: Azadshahr, Iran
- Height: 1.78 m (5 ft 10 in)
- Position: Striker

Team information
- Current team: Foolad B
- Number: 29

Youth career
- 2004–2008: Oghab Gonbad
- 2008–2012: Sepahan
- 2012–2014: Foolad

Senior career*
Years	Team	Apps	(Gls)
2014–2017	Foolad	9	(0)
2017–2018	Baadraan		
2018–2019	Iranjavan		
2019–2020	Setareh Sorkh Kashan		
2020–2023	Khalij Fars Mahshahr		
2023–2024	Persepolis Borazjan		
2024	Esteghlal Zeydun		
2024–2025	Shahrdari Mahshahr		
2025–	Foolad B		
- * Club domestic league appearances and goals as of 13 May 2016

Bahman Jahantigh (Persian: بهمن جهان‌تیغ; born 14 March 1995) is an Iranian footballer who plays as a striker for Foolad B in League 2.

== Club career ==
=== Foolad ===
He joined Foolad U19 in 2012. After shining in 2013–14 Iranian U19 Premier League where he won top scorer prize with 18 goals he was promoted to first team by Dragan Skočić and signed three-years contract which kept him until 2017 at Foolad. He made his debut for Foolad in the 12th fixture of the 2014–15 Iran Pro League against Zob Ahan as a substitute for Sasan Ansari. On 5 May 2015 he scored his first professional goal in a 1–0 over Lokomotiv Tashkent in the AFC Champions League.

== Club career statistics ==
As of 15 May 2015.

Club	Division	Season	League		Hazfi Cup		Asia		Total	
Club	Division	Season	Apps	Goals	Apps	Goals	Apps	Goals	Apps	Goals
Foolad	Pro League	2014–15	4	0	0	0	2	1	6	1
Career Totals			4	0	0	0	2	1	6	1
