= 2009 China League Two =

China League Two
- Season: 2009
- Champions: Hunan Billows
- Promoted: Hunan Billows; Hubei Luyin
- Matches: 90
- Goals: 205 (2.28 per match)
- Top goalscorer: Lian Chen, Akram (8)

The 2009 China League Two season is the 20th season since its establishment. The league started on the 9th of May 2009, and ended on 28 November 2009 with the play-off final. Winners and runners-up promotes to China League One.

== Division Standings ==
Updated on 26 Sep 2009.

=== South Division ===
Pos	Team	Pld	W	D	L	GF	GA	GD	Pts	Qualification
1	Hubei Luyin (Q, P)	10	7	3	0	15	1	+14	24	Play-off semi-finals
2	Hunan Billows (Q, C, P)	10	3	6	1	12	5	+7	15	Play-off first round
3	Hubei CTGU Kangtian (Q)	10	4	3	3	5	8	−3	15	Play-off first round
4	Guizhou Zhicheng (Q)	10	3	5	2	9	4	+5	14	Play-off first round
5	Wenzhou Tomorrow	10	3	1	6	9	17	−8	10	
6	Ningbo Huaao	10	0	2	8	3	18	−15	2	

=== North Division ===
Pos	Team	Pld	W	D	L	GF	GA	GD	Pts	Qualification
1	Beijing Baxy&Shengshi (Q)	12	6	3	3	17	12	+5	21	Play-off semi-finals
2	Hangzhou Sanchao (Q)	12	5	5	2	11	8	+3	20	Play-off first round
3	Tianjin Songjiang (Q)	12	4	6	2	17	11	+6	18	Play-off first round
4	Tianjin Huochetou (Q)	12	4	4	4	11	14	-3	16	Play-off first round
5	Yantai Yiteng	12	4	2	6	17	15	+2	14	
6	Panjin Mengzun	12	4	1	7	10	19	−9	13	
7	Qingdao QUST	12	2	5	5	6	10	−4	11	

== Play-offs ==
- Play-off finalists promotes to China League One.
- According to the rule, the 2008–09 China University Football League winners and runners-up will qualify for the play-off first round. However, the winners China Three Gorges University had already qualified as Hubei CTGU Kangtian, and the 3rd place Tongji University withdrew. Therefore, the runners-up Hohai University and the 4th place Yanbian University qualified to play-offs.

=== First round ===
Team 1	Agg.	Team 2	1st leg	2nd leg
Hangzhou Sanchao	3–3(a)	Hubei CTGU Kangtian	0–2	3–1
Hohai University	3–7	Yanbian University	2–4	1–3
Tianjin Songjiang	1–4	Guizhou Zhicheng	1–1	0–3
Tianjin Huochetou	3–4	Hunan Billows	0–1	3–3

=== Second round ===
Team 1	Agg.	Team 2	1st leg	2nd leg
Hangzhou Sanchao	3–2	Guizhou Zhicheng	2–2	1–0
Yanbian University	1–5	Hunan Billows	0–4	1–1

=== Semi-finals / Promotion finals ===
Team 1	Agg.	Team 2	1st leg	2nd leg
Beijing Baxy&Shengshi	7–8	Hunan Billows (P)	4–3	3–5
Hangzhou Sanchao	0–1	Hubei Luyin (P)	0–0	0–1

=== Third place match ===
2009-11-28
9:30

Beijing Baxy&Shengshi	4 – 2	Hangzhou Sanchao
Zhang Shuang 28'; Chen Fangzhou 33'; Yao Liang	Report	Tang Jiashu 42'; Lin Longchang

Field 2, Xingyao Stadium, Kunming

=== Champions final ===
2009-11-28
9:30

Hunan Billows	1 – 1	Hubei Luyin
Akram 68'	Report	Mei Fang 14'
Penalties
Akram (penalty scored); Yang Baoming (penalty scored); Hu Hao (penalty scored); Zhang Pengnan (penalty scored)	4 – 2	(penalty missed) Mei Fang; (penalty scored) Ke Zhao; (penalty scored) Kong Linglong; (penalty missed) Wang Wenhua

Xingyao Stadium, Kunming
Referee: Zhao Liang

== Top scorers ==
Updated 28 Nov 2009

Rank	Player	Club	Goals
1	(China) Lian Chen	Tianjin Songjiang	8
1	(China) Akram	Hunan Billows	8
3	(China) Du Shaobin	Guizhou Zhicheng	7
3	(China) Yang Zi	Hangzhou Sanchao	7
5	(China) Du Xin	Beijing Baxy&Shengshi	6
6	4 players		5
10	6 players		4
16	10 players		3
26	14 players		2
40	59 players		1

== See also ==
- 2009 in Chinese football
