= Hangzhou Sanchao F.C. =

Chinese football club

Hangzhou Sanchao 杭州三超
- Full name: Hangzhou Sanchao F.C. 杭州三超足球俱乐部
- Founded: 2007; 18 years ago
- Dissolved: 2009
- Ground: Xiaoshan Sports Centre, Hangzhou, China
- Capacity: 15,000
- League: Chinese Yi League
- 2009: Chinese Yi League, 4th
Home colours	Away colours

Hangzhou Sanchao F.C. (Simplified Chinese: 杭州三超足球俱乐部) was a football club based in Hangzhou, China. It operated as the U-19 team of Zhejiang Greentown. In 2009, the club was disbanded, with most of its players transferred to its parent club.

== See also ==
Zhejiang Greentown
