= 2010 Dalian Aerbin F.C. season =

Dalian Aerbin F.C.
- Owner: Zhao Mingyang
- General Manager: Li Ming
- Manager: Sun Xianlu
- Stadium: Dalian University Stadium
- China League Two: 1st (promoted)
- Top goalscorer: Guo Hui (9 goals)

The 2010 Dalian Aerbin F.C. season was the team's first season in history. Dalian Aerbin topped the 2010 China League Two through promotion playoffs, and gained promotion into the China League One.

== Overview ==
Dalian Aerbin F.C. was established in 2009 by Dalian Aerbin Group and its owner, Zhao Mingyang. The team would participate in the 2010 China League Two. Li Ming was appointed as the general manager, while many former footballers and managers from Dalian were appointed. The team set bold target to promote into the Chinese Super League.

== Players ==
As of 9 May 2010

Note: Flags indicate national team as defined under FIFA eligibility rules; some limited exceptions apply. Players may hold more than one non-FIFA nationality.

No.	Pos.	Nation	Player
1	GK	(China) CHN	Yu Ziqian (vice captain)
2	DF	(China) CHN	Lü Zheng
3	DF	(China) CHN	Zhang Song
4	DF	(China) CHN	Zhang Tianxiang
5	DF	(China) CHN	Li Longri
6	MF	(China) CHN	Zhu Xiaogang
7	MF	(China) CHN	Zhunang Yuan
8	MF	(China) CHN	Zhao Kening
9	FW	(China) CHN	Xu Yiwen
10	FW	(China) CHN	Guo Hui
11	FW	(China) CHN	Hou Zhe
12	MF	(China) CHN	Zhou Tong
13	MF	(China) CHN	Yin Lu

No.	Pos.	Nation	Player
14	DF	(China) CHN	Yu Zhen
15	MF	(China) CHN	Sun Haosheng
16	MF	(China) CHN	Wang Meng
17	DF	(China) CHN	Wang Jing
18	FW	(China) CHN	Chen Hongquan
19	GK	(China) CHN	Lei Tao
20	MF	(China) CHN	Li Yuhang
21	MF	(China) CHN	Zhu Junye
22	DF	(China) CHN	Sun Yunpeng
23	DF	(China) CHN	Chang Lin (captain)
24	MF	(China) CHN	Song Lihui
25	MF	(China) CHN	Sun Bo
26	DF	(China) CHN	Yang Lin

== Technical Staff ==
Position	Name
Head coach	(China) Sun Xianlu
Assistant coaches	(China) Zhang Kun (China) Cheng Jun (China) Song Lihui
Technical coach	(China) Li Guoxu
Team doctor	(China) Li Hengjun

== China League Two ==
=== Group stage ===
==== League table ====
Pos	Team	Pld	W	D	L	GF	GA	GD	Pts	Qualification
1	Dalian Aerbin (C) (P)	16	11	1	4	29	11	+18	34	Play-off semi-finals
2	Dalian Yiteng	16	8	3	5	23	17	+6	27	Play-off first round
3	Tianjin Huochetou	16	6	2	8	15	17	−2	20	Play-off first round
4	Liaoning Tiger	16	4	6	6	12	23	−11	18	
5	Panjin Mengzun	16	4	2	10	14	25	−11	14	

==== Fixtures and results ====
9 May 2010 1	Panjin Mengzun	0–1	Dalian Aerbin	Panjin, Liaoning
15:00 (UTC+08:00)			Guo Hui 43' (pen.)	Stadium: Panjin Stadium

15 May 2010 2	Liaoning Northeast Tiger	0–1	Dalian Aerbin	Benxi, Liaoning
15:00 (UTC+08:00)			Sun Haosheng 62'	Stadium: Benxi Dongfen Stadium

22 May 2010 3	Dalian Aerbin	4–1	Dalian Yiteng	Dalian, Liaoning
15:00 (UTC+08:00)	Guo Hui 27' (pen.); Xu Yiwen 37', 53'; Zhunag Yuan 85'		Wang Ziming 82' (pen.)	Stadium: Dalian University Stadium

29 May 2010 4	Void	–
(UTC+08:00)

5 June 2010 5	Jingtie Locomotive	0–1	Dalian Aerbin	Tianjin
15:00 (UTC+08:00)			Zhao Kening 44'	Stadium: Tianjin Ningyuan Locomotive Stadium

17 July 2010 6	Dalian Aerbin	2–0	Panjin Mengzun	Dalian, Liaoning
16:00 (UTC+08:00)	Chang Lin 57'; Guo Hui 88'			Stadium: Dalian University Stadium

24 July 2010 7	Dalian Aerbin	0–0	Liaoning Northeast Tiger	Dalian, Liaoning
16:00 (UTC+08:00)				Stadium: Dalian University Stadium

31 July 2010 8	Dalian Yiteng	3–0	Dalian Aerbin	Dalian, Liaoning
16:00 (UTC+08:00)	Shao Shuai 24'; Han Xu 35'; Zou Jie 90'			Stadium: Liaoning Normal University South Stadium

7 August 2010 9	Void	–
(UTC+08:00)

14 August 2010 10	Dalian Aerbin	4–1	Jingtie Locomotive	Dalian, Liaoning
16:00 (UTC+08:00)	Yang Lin 21', 50'; Yin Lu 84'; Sun Bo 87'		Lü Hongchen 90+1'	Stadium: Dalian University Stadium

21 August 2010 11	Panjin Mengzun	0–4	Dalian Aerbin	Panjin, Liaoning
15:00 (UTC+08:00)			Chang Lin 20'; Yang Lin 36'; Guo Hui 50'; Sun Bo 65'	Stadium: Panjin Stadium

28 August 2010 12	Liaoning Northeast Tiger	2–1	Dalian Aerbin	Chaoyang, Liaoning
15:00 (UTC+08:00)	Hu Yanqiang 76'; Abduwali Ablet 86'		Zhou Tong 31'	Stadium: Chaoyang Stadium

4 September 2010 13	Dalian Aerbin	3–1	Dalian Yiteng	Dalian, Liaoning
15:00 (UTC+08:00)	Guo Hui 10', 35'; Zhuang Yuan 85'		Zhang Jingyang 83'	Stadium: Dalian University Stadium

11 September 2010 14	Void	–
(UTC+08:00)

18 September 2010 15	Jingtie Locomotive	1–0	Dalian Aerbin	Tianjin
15:00 (UTC+08:00)	Zhang Hongbin 35'			Stadium: Tianjin Ningyuan Locomotive Stadium

26 September 2010 16	Dalian Aerbin	2–1	Panjin Mengzun	Dalian, Liaoning
15:00 (UTC+08:00)	Guo Hui 23', 36'		Wu Dingmao 65'	Stadium: Dalian University Stadium

2 October 2010 17	Dalian Aerbin	3–0	Liaoning Northeast Tiger	Dalian, Liaoning
15:00 (UTC+08:00)	Guo Hui 67'; Zhuang Yuan 83'; Zhou Ting 88'			Stadium: Dalian University Stadium

9 October 2010 18	Dalian Yiteng	1–0	Dalian Aerbin	Dalian, Liaoning
15:00 (UTC+08:00)	Han Jiabao 88'			Stadium: Liaoning Normal University South Stadium

16 October 2010 19	Void	–
(UTC+08:00)

23 October 2010 20	Dalian Aerbin	3–0	Jingtie Locomotive	Dalian, Liaoning
15:00 (UTC+08:00)	Chang Lin 47', 90'; Chen Hongquan 67'			Stadium: Dalian University Stadium

=== Promotion playoffs ===
==== Semi-finals ====
===== First leg =====
27 November 2010

Dalian Aerbin	3–1	Guizhou Zhicheng
Yin Lu 68'; Zhou Tong 72'; Guo Hui 83'		Du Shaobin 22'

Olympic Sports Center, Chongqing

===== Second leg =====
29 November 2010

Guizhou Zhicheng	0–0	Dalian Aerbin

Olympic Sports Center, Chongqing

==== Final ====
1 December 2010

Dalian Aerbin	2–0	Tianjin Songjiang
Guo Hui 12'; Hou Zhe 66'

Olympic Sports Center, Chongqing
