= 2019 Chongqing Dangdai Lifan F.C. season =

Chongqing Dangdai Lifan
2019 season
- Stadium: Chongqing Olympic Sports Center
- Average home league attendance: 30,901

The 2019 Chongqing Dangdai Lifan F.C. season was Chongqing Dangdai Lifan's 5th consecutive season in the Chinese Super League since it started in the 2004 season, and its 5th consecutive season in the top flight of Chinese football. This season Chongqing Dangdai Lifan participated in the Chinese Super League and Chinese FA Cup.

== Squad statistics ==
=== Appearances and goals ===
As of match played unknown

No.	Pos	Nat	Player	Total		Super League		FA Cup	
No.	Pos	Nat	Player	Apps	Goals	Apps	Goals	Apps	Goals
				0	0	0	0	0	0
Players transferred out during the season

=== Disciplinary record ===
As of match played unknown

No.	Pos	Nat	Player	Super League			FA Cup			Total		
No.	Pos	Nat	Player	Yellow card	Second yellow card	Red card	Yellow card	Second yellow card	Red card	Yellow card	Second yellow card	Red card
				0	0	0	0	0	0	0	0	0
Total				0	0	0	0	0	0	0	0	0

== Competitions ==
=== Chinese Super League ===
==== Table ====
Pos	Team	Pld	W	D	L	GF	GA	GD	Pts
8	Henan Jianye	30	11	8	11	41	46	−5	41 (Note: Head-to-head results: Henan Jianye 2–3 Tianjin TEDA, Tianjin TEDA 2–0 Henan Jianye.)
9	Dalian Yifang	30	10	8	12	44	51	−7	38
10	Chongqing Dangdai Lifan	30	9	9	12	36	47	−11	36
11	Hebei China Fortune	30	9	6	15	37	55	−18	33
12	Guangzhou R&F	30	9	5	16	54	72	−18	32

Source: CSL
Rules for classification:
- During season: 1) Points; 2) Goal difference; 3) Goals scored.
- After season: 1) Points; 2) Head-to-head points; 3) Head-to-head goal difference; 4) Head-to-head goals scored; 5) Scores of the weight ratio of the reserve league and youth leagues.
  Notes:

==== Results summary ====
Overall								Home						Away					
Pld	W	D	L	GF	GA	GD	Pts	W	D	L	GF	GA	GD	W	D	L	GF	GA	GD
9	4	3	2	14	14	0	15	3	1	2	7	8	−1	1	2	0	7	6	+1

Last updated: 11 May 2019.
Source: League table

==== Results by round ====
Round	1	2	3	4	5	6	7	8	9	10	11	12	13	14	15	16	17	18	19	20	21	22	23	24	25	26	27	28	29	30
Ground	H	H	H	A	H	A	H	A	H																					
Result	D	L	W	W	W	D	W	D	W																					
Position	7	7	5	5	5	5	4	4	4																					

First match(es) will be played on 2 March 2019. Source: Competitive matches
A = Away; H = Home; W = Win; D = Draw; L = Loss

==== Matches ====
All times are local (UTC+8).

2 March 2019 1	Chongqing Dangdai Lifan	2–2	Guangzhou R&F	Chongqing
15:30 UTC+8	Alan Kardec 25' (pen.) 90+3'; Jiang Zhe (yellow card) 28'; Luo Hao (yellow card) 38'	Summary	Dembélé (yellow card) 10'; Ye Chugui 56' (yellow card) 64'; Zahavi 74'; Tang Miao (yellow card) 87'	Stadium: Chongqing Olympic Sports Center; Attendance: 33,586; Referee: Wang Di (referee)

9 March 2019 2	Chongqing Dangdai Lifan	0–4	Beijing Sinobo Guoan	Chongqing
19:30		Summary	Jonathan Viera 2'; Yu Dabao (yellow card) 13'; Bakambu 36'; Zhang Yuning 42'; Li Lei (yellow card) 81'; Chi Zhongguo (yellow card) 82'; Wang Ziming 90+2'	Stadium: Chongqing Olympic Sports Center; Attendance: 34,865; Referee: Shen Yinhao

31 March 2019 3	Chongqing Dangdai Lifan	1–0	Shenzhen	Chongqing
20:35 UTC+8	Mierzejewski 20'; Fernandinho (red card) 65'	Summary	Jin Qiang (yellow card) 30'; Ge Zhen (red card) 80'	Stadium: Chongqing Olympic Sports Center; Attendance: 27,838; Referee: Ma Ning (referee)

5 April 2019 4	Shanghai SIPG	2–3	Chongqing Dangdai Lifan	Shanghai
19:35 UTC+8	Lü Wenjun 54'; Hulk 58' (yellow card) 90+5'; Li Shenglong (yellow card) 79'; Yu Hai (yellow card) 84'	Summary	Mierzejewski 30'; Fernandinho 39'; Chen Lei (yellow card) 45+2'; Jiang Zhe (yellow card) 57'; Alan Kardec (yellow card) 74'; Yan Junling 90+3' (o.g.)	Stadium: Shanghai Stadium; Attendance: 21,758; Referee: Ma Li

13 April 2019 5	Chongqing Dangdai Lifan	2–1	Hebei China Fortune	Chongqing
15:30 UTC+8	Luo Hao (yellow card) 20'; Fernandinho 52'; Sui Weijie (yellow card) 56'; Peng Xinli 70' (yellow card) 88'; Chen Lei (yellow card) 90'	Summary	El Kaabi (yellow card) 13'; Luo Senwen (yellow card) 26'; Zhao Yuhao (yellow card) 61'; Tao Qianglong 78'	Stadium: Chongqing Olympic Sports Center; Attendance: 32,263; Referee: Li Haixin

21 April 2019 6	Dalian Yifang	1–1	Chongqing Dangdai Lifan	Dalian
16:30 UTC+8	Carrasco 68'	Summary	Yang Shuai (yellow card) 75'; Fernandinho 79' (pen.) (yellow card) 90+3'; Mierzejewski (yellow card) 90+1'	Stadium: Dalian Sports Center Stadium; Attendance: 26,618; Referee: (England) Mark Clattenburg

28 April 2019 7	Chongqing Dangdai Lifan	0–1	Guangzhou Evergrande	Chongqing
20:00 UTC+8	Luo Hao (yellow card) 61'; Feng Jing (yellow card) 62'	Summary	Talisca 45+1'	Stadium: Chongqing Olympic Sports Center; Attendance: 41,892; Referee: Zhang Lei (referee)

5 May 2019 8	Tianjin Tianhai	3–3	Chongqing Dangdai Lifan	Tianjin
20:35 UTC+8	Wang Yongpo 46' (yellow card) 80'; Alan 73' (pen.); Jiang Zhe 90' (o.g.); Wen Jiabao (red card) 90+6'	Summary	Yuan Mincheng (yellow card) 10' (goal) 90+3'; Yin Congyao 33'; Feng Jing 37'; Sui Weijie (yellow card) 62'; Jiang Zhe (yellow card) 72'	Stadium: Tianjin Olympic Center; Attendance: 20,024; Referee: Wang Di (referee)

11 May 2019 9	Chongqing Dangdai Lifan	2–0	Beijing Renhe	Chongqing
20:35 UTC+8	Fernandinho 69'; Dilmurat Mawlanyaz 85'	Summary	Chen Jie (yellow card) 20'	Stadium: Chongqing Olympic Sports Center; Attendance: 32,157; Referee: Shi Zhenlu

17 May 2019 10	Jiangsu Suning	–	Chongqing Dangdai Lifan	Nanjing
19:35 UTC+8				Stadium: Nanjing Olympic Sports Centre

=== Chinese FA Cup ===
1 May 2018 Fourth Round	Chongqing Dangdai Lifan	1–0	Hebei China Fortune	Chongqing
19:00	Yin Congyao (yellow card) 39'; Alan Kardec 49'; Dong Honglin (yellow card) 88'; Yuan Mincheng (yellow card) 90+5'	Summary	Wang Qiuming (yellow card) 88'; Geng Xiaofeng (red card) 90+4'	Stadium: Chongqing Olympic Sports Center; Attendance: 6,982; Referee: Niu Minghui

29 May 2018 Last 16	Shanghai Greenland Shenhua	v	Chongqing Dangdai Lifan	Shanghai
				Stadium: Hongkou Football Stadium
