= Liu Yun (footballer) =

Chinese association football player

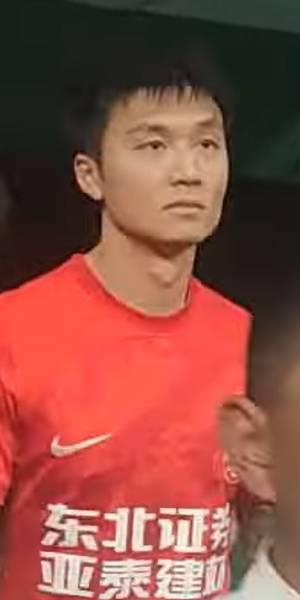
- Liu Yun in June 2023

Personal information
- Date of birth: 7 January 1995 (age 31)
- Place of birth: Huangshi, Hubei, China
- Height: 1.75 m (5 ft 9 in)
- Position: Midfielder

Team information
- Current team: Dalian K'un City
- Number: 22

Senior career*
Years	Team	Apps	(Gls)
2014–2022	Wuhan Yangtze River	138	(10)
2023–2024	Changchun Yatai	27	(0)
2025	Meizhou Hakka	28	(3)
2026–	Dalian K'un City	0	(0)
- * Club domestic league appearances and goals as of 28 August 2025

Liu Yun (simplified Chinese: 刘云; traditional Chinese: 劉雲; pinyin: Liú Yún; born 7 January 1995) is a Chinese professional footballer who currently plays as a left-footed midfielder for China League One club Dalian K'un City.

== Club career ==
=== Wuhan Zall ===
Liu Yun would be promoted to the senior team of Wuhan Zall in the 2014 China League One campaign and would go on to make his debut on 21 March 2015 in a league game against Tianjin Songjiang that ended in a 1–0 defeat. He would go on to be an integral member of the team that gained promotion to the top tier for the club by winning the 2018 China League One division. He would make his top tier debut on 14 April 2019 against Shanghai SIPG in a league game that ended in a 2–1 defeat. He would go on to be a vital member of the team that not only survived relegation, but finished sixth at the end of the 2019 Chinese Super League campaign.

The club would not be able to improve upon this position and at the end of the 2022 Chinese Super League season, Wuhan were relegated. On 25 January 2023, the club announced that it had dissolved due to financial difficulties.

=== Changchun Yatai ===
On 7 April 2023, Liu joined fellow top tier club Changchun Yatai on a free transfer. On 22 April 2023, he made his debut for Yatai in a 3-2 home win against Dalian Professional. On 21 June 2024, Liu scored his first goal for the club in a 2-2 away draw against Shaanxi Union in a Chinese FA Cup fourth round game, which Yatai subsequently won 3-2 on penalties.

=== Meizhou Hakka ===
On 25 January 2025, Liu joined fellow top tier club Meizhou Hakka.

=== Dalian K'un City ===
On 14 February 2026, Liu joined China League One club Dalian K'un City.

== Career statistics ==
As of 4 November 2023

Club	Season	League			National Cup		Continental		Other		Total	
Club	Season	Division	Apps	Goals	Apps	Goals	Apps	Goals	Apps	Goals	Apps	Goals
Wuhan Zall/ Wuhan FC/ Wuhan Yangtze River	2014	China League One	0	0	0	0	–		–		0	0
Wuhan Zall/ Wuhan FC/ Wuhan Yangtze River	2015	China League One	17	0	1	0	–		–		18	0
Wuhan Zall/ Wuhan FC/ Wuhan Yangtze River	2016	China League One	5	0	1	0	–		–		6	0
Wuhan Zall/ Wuhan FC/ Wuhan Yangtze River	2017	China League One	12	0	1	0	–		–		13	0
Wuhan Zall/ Wuhan FC/ Wuhan Yangtze River	2018	China League One	24	1	1	1	–		–		25	2
Wuhan Zall/ Wuhan FC/ Wuhan Yangtze River	2019	Chinese Super League	22	6	0	0	–		–		22	6
Wuhan Zall/ Wuhan FC/ Wuhan Yangtze River	2020	Chinese Super League	20	2	0	0	–		2 (Note: Appearance(s) in Promotion/Relegation Play-offs)	0	22	2
Wuhan Zall/ Wuhan FC/ Wuhan Yangtze River	2021	Chinese Super League	20	1	4	2	–		–		24	3
Wuhan Zall/ Wuhan FC/ Wuhan Yangtze River	2022	Chinese Super League	18	0	0	0	–		–		18	0
Wuhan Zall/ Wuhan FC/ Wuhan Yangtze River	Total		138	10	8	3	0	0	2	0	148	13
Changchun Yatai	2023	Chinese Super League	16	0	1	0	–		–		17	0
Career total			154	10	9	3	0	0	2	0	165	13

== Honours ==
=== Club ===
Wuhan Zall

- China League One: 2018.
