= Weijie =

Weijie is a given name. Notable people with the name include:

- Wei Jie (卫玠, 286 – 312), Eastern Jin scholar.
- Gong Weijie (born 1986), Chinese badminton player
- Jiang Weijie (born 1991), Chinese professional Go player
- Sui Weijie (born 1983), Chinese footballer
