= Sun Haosheng =

Chinese footballer

Sun Haosheng 孙昊晟
Personal information
- Full name: Sun Haosheng
- Date of birth: 1 February 1988 (age 38)
- Place of birth: Qingdao, Shandong, China
- Height: 1.78 m (5 ft 10 in)
- Positions: Full-back; winger

Youth career
- 2004–2008: Beijing Guoan
- 2009: Qingdao QUST

Senior career*
Years	Team	Apps	(Gls)
2010–2013	Dalian Aerbin	26	(1)
2013	→ Guizhou Zhicheng (loan)	26	(6)
2014–2018	Shijiazhuang Ever Bright	76	(6)
2019–2021	Zhejiang	7	(0)
2021	→ Hebei Zhuoao (loan)	2	(0)
- * Club domestic league appearances and goals as of 14 April 2022

Sun Haosheng (Chinese: 孙昊晟; born 1 February 1988) is a Chinese former footballer who played as a full-back.

== Club career ==
Sun Haosheng started his professional football career in 2010 when he joined Dalian Aerbin for the 2010 China League Two campaign. He would be part of the squad that won the division title and promotion into the second tier. The following season he would go on to aid his team with another division title and promotion into the top tier. Within the Chinese Super League Sun struggled to gain any playing time throughout the 2012 Chinese Super League season and in February 2013, Sun moved to China League One side Guizhou Zhicheng on a one-year loan deal.

On 15 January 2015, Sun transferred to China League One side Shijiazhuang Yongchang where in his debut season with the club he was able to gain promotion with his new team. On 13 September 2015, Sun made his debut for Shijiazhuang in the 2015 Chinese Super League against Henan Jianye, coming on as a substitute for Hu Wei in the 62nd minute.

On 1 February 2019, Sun transferred to fellow League One side Zhejiang Greentown. He would have to wait until 19 September 2020 to make his debut in a league game against Shaanxi Chang'an Athletic F.C. that ended in a 1-1 draw. The following season he would be loaned out to third tier club Hebei Zhuoao. On his return, Sun retired from professional football after the 2021 season.

== Career statistics ==
Statistics accurate as of match played 14 April 2022.

Appearances and goals by club, season and competition
Club	Season	League			National Cup		Continental		Other		Total	
Club	Season	Division	Apps	Goals	Apps	Goals	Apps	Goals	Apps	Goals	Apps	Goals
Dalian Aerbin	2010	China League Two	17	1	-		-		-		17	1
Dalian Aerbin	2011	China League One	9	0	2	0	-		-		11	0
Dalian Aerbin	2012	Chinese Super League	0	0	0	0	-		-		0	0
Dalian Aerbin	Total		26	1	2	0	0	0	0	0	28	1
Guizhou Zhicheng (loan)	2013	China League One	26	6	0	0	-		-		26	6
Shijiazhuang Ever Bright	2014	China League One	25	6	0	0	-		-		25	6
Shijiazhuang Ever Bright	2015	Chinese Super League	4	0	0	0	-		-		4	0
Shijiazhuang Ever Bright	2016	Chinese Super League	16	0	1	0	-		-		17	0
Shijiazhuang Ever Bright	2017	China League One	9	0	0	0	-		-		9	0
Shijiazhuang Ever Bright	2018	China League One	22	1	0	0	-		-		22	1
Shijiazhuang Ever Bright	Total		76	7	1	0	0	0	0	0	77	7
Zhejiang Greentown	2019	China League One	0	0	0	0	-		-		0	0
Zhejiang Greentown	2020	China League One	7	0	0	0	-		2 (Note: Appearance(s) in CSL Relegation play-offs)	0	9	0
Zhejiang Greentown	Total		7	0	0	0	0	0	2	0	9	0
Hebei Zhuoao (loan)	2021	China League Two	2	0	0	0	-		-		2	0
Career total			137	14	3	0	0	0	2	0	142	14

== Honours ==
=== Club ===
Dalian Aerbin

- China League One: 2011
- China League Two: 2010
