= Jiangzhe =

Jiangzhe may refer to:

- Wu (region) or Jiangzhe (江浙), a region in the Jiangnan area
- Jiangzhe people, often synonymous with Wu Chinese-speaking people
- Jiangzhe province (江浙行省) during the Yuan dynasty
- Jiang Zhe, a Chinese football player

== See also ==
- Zhejiang
