= Yin Lu =

Chinese footballer

Yin Lu 尹路
Personal information
- Date of birth: 3 January 1989 (age 37)
- Place of birth: Jinzhou, Liaoning, China
- Height: 1.82 m (5 ft 11 1/2 in)
- Position: Defender

Senior career*
Years	Team	Apps	(Gls)
2008	Shaanxi Star	?	(?)
2010–2012	Dalian Aerbin	52	(4)
2013–2014	Jiangsu Sainty	3	(0)
2014	→ Taiyuan Zhongyou Jiayi (loan)	12	(1)
2015–2017	Inner Mongolia Zhongyou	81	(3)
2018	Dalian Transcendence	29	(4)
2019–2020	Inner Mongolia Zhongyou	38	(1)
2021	Hebei Zhuoao	19	(0)
2022	Guangxi Pingguo Haliao	16	(0)
2023	Dalian Yingbo	16	(0)
2024–2025	Dalian K'un City	36	(0)
- * Club domestic league appearances and goals as of 31 December 2019

Yin Lu (Chinese: 尹路; pinyin: Yǐn Lù; born 3 January 1989) is a Chinese footballer.

== Club career ==
Yin started his professional career with China League Two side Shaanxi Star in 2008. He joined a new founded club Dalian Aerbin in 2009. He made 17 appearances and scored 2 goals in the 2010 season as Dalian Aerbin finished the first place and won promotion to League One. Liu went on to appear 13 times in the League One, the club won two consecutive champions and promotions and enter the top flight in the 2011 season. He scored his first Super League goal on 6 May 2012, in a 2–1 away defeat against Guangzhou Evergrande. Yin transferred to Chinese Super League side Jiangsu Sainty in January 2013. In July 2014, Yin moved to China League Two side Taiyuan Zhongyou Jiayi until 31 December 2014.

On 5 February 2018, Yin transferred to fellow China League One side Dalian Transcendence.

== Career statistics ==
Statistics accurate as of match played 31 December 2019.

Appearances and goals by club, season and competition
Club	Season	League			National Cup		Continental		Other		Total	
Club	Season	Division	Apps	Goals	Apps	Goals	Apps	Goals	Apps	Goals	Apps	Goals
Shaanxi Star	2008	China League Two			-		-		-			
Dalian Aerbin	2010	China League Two	17	2	-		-		-		17	2
Dalian Aerbin	2011	China League One	13	1	2	0	-		-		15	1
Dalian Aerbin	2012	Chinese Super League	22	1	2	0	-		-		24	1
Dalian Aerbin	Total		52	4	4	0	0	0	0	0	56	4
Jiangsu Sainty	2013	Chinese Super League	3	0	1	0	1	0	0 (Note: Appearances in Chinese FA Super Cup)	0	5	0
Jiangsu Sainty	2014	Chinese Super League	0	0	0	0	-		-		0	0
Jiangsu Sainty	Total		3	0	1	0	1	0	0	0	5	0
Nei Mongol Zhongyou	2014	China League Two	12	1	-		-		-		12	1
Nei Mongol Zhongyou	2015	China League One	28	1	2	0	-		-		30	1
Nei Mongol Zhongyou	2016	China League One	25	0	2	0	-		-		27	0
Nei Mongol Zhongyou	2017	China League One	28	2	2	0	-		-		30	2
Nei Mongol Zhongyou	Total		93	4	6	0	0	0	0	0	99	4
Dalian Transcendence	2018	China League One	29	4	0	0	-		-		29	4
Inner Mongolia Zhongyou	2019	China League One	27	1	0	0	-		-		27	1
Career total			204	13	11	0	1	0	0	0	216	13

== Honours ==
Dalian Aerbin

- China League One: 2011
- China League Two: 2010

Jiangsu Suning

- Chinese FA Super Cup: 2013
