= Han Xu =

Han Xu (Wade–Giles: Han Hsu) may refer to::

- Han Xu (diplomat) (韩叙; 1924–1994), Chinese ambassador to the United States
- Han Xu (footballer) (韩旭; born 1988), Chinese footballer
- Han Xu (basketball) (韩旭; born 1999), Chinese basketball player

== See also ==
- Han Xue (disambiguation)
