= Yang Lin (footballer) =

Chinese footballer (born 1981)

Yang Lin 杨林
Personal information
- Full name: Yang Lin
- Date of birth: March 14, 1981 (age 45)
- Place of birth: Dalian, Liaoning, China
- Height: 1.94 m (6 ft 4 in)
- Positions: Striker; defender

Team information
- Current team: Dalian K'un City (head coach)

Youth career
- 2000–2001: Dalian Shide

Senior career*
| Years | Team | Apps | (Gls) |
| 2002–2006 | Dalian Sidelong | 84 | (20) |
| 2007–2009 | Henan Jianye | 41 | (3) |
| 2009 | → Dalian Shide (loan) | 16 | (2) |
| 2010–2012 | Dalian Aerbin | 26 | (4) |
| 2013 | Shijiazhuang Yongchang Junhao | 23 | (1) |
| 2014–2016 | Hebei Elite | 46 | (6) |
| 2017 | Yinchuan Helanshan | 22 | (1) |

International career^{‡}
| 2002–2008 | China | 6 | (1) |

Managerial career
- 2019: Guangxi Baoyun
- 2020: Xiamen Egret Island
- 2021–2023: Guangxi Pingguo Haliao
- 2023: Wuxi Wugo
- 2023–2024: Shanghai Jiading Huilong
- 2025: Shijiazhuang Gongfu (team manager)
- 2026: Ningbo FC
- 2026–: Dalian K'un City
- * Club domestic league appearances and goals as of 4 November 2017 ‡ National team caps and goals as of 23 April 2008

Yang Lin (Chinese: 杨林; born March 14, 1981, in Dalian) is a Chinese football coach and former professional football player

== Club career ==
=== Shanghai United ===
Yang Lin started his professional football career in 2002 with second tier football club Dalian Sidelong and would go on to establish himself as a regular as the club moved from Dalian to Zhuhai, then to Shanghai while changing their name multiple times, eventually to Shanghai United. He played a significant role in the promotion of Zhuhai Zobon into the China Super League in the 2004 league season.

=== Henan Jianye ===
At the beginning of 2007, he joined the newly promoted Henan Jianye in the China Super League where he had a very productive season, he played in 14 league games and scored one goal. After seeing Henan establish themselves as mid-table team, the following season was proved less successful for Yang Lin as he was only able to make seven appearances for Henan.

=== Return to Dalian ===
After a personally disappointing season for Yang Lin which saw him lose his place at Henan, he transferred to Dalian Shide. At Dalian, Yang Lin would be utilized as a centre back due to his height for several games. He would return to his position as a striker against Shenzhen Asia Travel in a league game which saw him score his first goal for Dalian. When his season long loan period ended, he decided to stay in Dalian with the newly formed Dalian Aerbin and play within the third tier during the beginning of the 2010 league season.

== International career ==
He made his debut for the senior national team on December 17, 2002, in a friendly against Syria in a 3–1 victory. In 2007, he played in the early stages of the 2010 FIFA World Cup qualification where he scored his first goal against Myanmar, however since then he only made several further friendly appearances before being dropped from the team.

== Coaching career ==
=== Guangxi Pingguo Haliao ===
In 2021, Lin was appointed as the head coach of Guangxi Pingguo Haliao. The club was promoted to China League One at the same year under his leadership.

=== Shanghai Jiading Huilong/Ningbo FC ===
In 2023, Lin was appointed as the head coach of Shanghai Jiading Huilong. In 2026, Lin returned to the club after it relocated to Ningbo. On 6 April 2026, Lin left his posotion and transited to technical director of the club.

=== Dalian K'un City ===
On 21 August 2026, Yang was named as the head coach of China League One side Dalian K'un City.

== Career statistics ==
=== Club statistics ===
Statistics accurate as of match played 4 November 2017.

| Season | Club | League | League | | CFA Cup | | CSL Cup | | Asia | | Total | |
| Season | Club | League | Apps | Goals | Apps | Goals | Apps | Goals | Apps | Goals | Apps | Goals |
|---|---|---|---|---|---|---|---|---|---|---|---|---|
| 2002 | Dalian Sidelong | Chinese Jia-B League | ? | 0 | ? | ? | - | - | - | - | >=0 | >=0 |
| 2003 | Zhuhai Anping | Chinese Jia-B League | 24 | 5 | ? | 0 | - | - | - | - | >=24 | 5 |
| 2004 | Zhuhai Zobon | China League One | 24 | 5 | 2 | 1 | - | - | - | - | 26 | 6 |
| 2005 | Shanghai Zobon | Chinese Super League | 17 | 7 | 0 | 0 | 1 | 1 | - | - | 18 | 8 |
| 2006 | Shanghai United | Chinese Super League | 19 | 3 | ? | 0 | - | - | - | - | >=19 | 3 |
| 2007 | Henan Jianye | Chinese Super League | 23 | 2 | - | - | - | - | - | - | 23 | 2 |
| 2008 | Henan Jianye | Chinese Super League | 18 | 1 | - | - | - | - | - | - | 18 | 1 |
| 2009 | Dalian Shide | Chinese Super League | 16 | 2 | - | - | - | - | - | - | 16 | 2 |
| 2010 | Dalian Aerbin | China League Two | 15 | 3 | - | - | - | - | - | - | 15 | 3 |
| 2011 | Dalian Aerbin | China League One | 11 | 1 | 2 | 0 | - | - | - | - | 13 | 1 |
| 2012 | Dalian Aerbin | Chinese Super League | 0 | 0 | 0 | 0 | - | - | - | - | 0 | 0 |
| 2013 | Shijiazhuang Yongchang Junhao | China League One | 23 | 1 | 0 | 0 | - | - | - | - | 23 | 1 |
| 2014 | Hebei Elite | China League Two | 13 | 3 | 1 | 0 | - | - | - | - | 14 | 3 |
| 2015 | Hebei Elite | China League Two | 16 | 3 | 2 | 0 | - | - | - | - | 18 | 3 |
| 2016 | Hebei Elite | China League Two | 17 | 6 | 0 | 0 | - | - | - | - | 17 | 6 |
| 2017 | Yinchuan Helanshan | China League Two | 22 | 1 | 1 | 0 | - | - | - | - | 23 | 1 |
| Total | | | >=258 | 37 | >=8 | >=1 | 1 | 1 | 0 | 0 | >=277 | >=39 |

=== International statistics ===
Last updated:23 April 2008

China national football team
| Year | Apps | Goals |
|---|---|---|
| 2002 | 1 | 0 |
| 2003 | 2 | 0 |
| 2007 | 1 | 1 |
| 2008 | 2 | 0 |
| Total | 6 | 1 |

== Honors ==
Dalian Aerbin

- China League Two: 2010
- China League One: 2011
