= Jiang Zhe (footballer) =

Chinese footballer

Jiang Zhe 蒋哲
Personal information
- Date of birth: 26 February 1989 (age 37)
- Place of birth: Dalian, Liaoning, China
- Height: 1.75 m (5 ft 9 in)
- Positions: Defender; midfielder

Youth career
- Dalian Yiteng

Senior career*
Years	Team	Apps	(Gls)
2006–2010	Harbin Yiteng		
2010–2018	Changchun Yatai	142	(4)
2019–2021	Chongqing Lifan	42	(1)
2021	→ Changchun Yatai (loan)	9	(0)
2022	Cangzhou Mighty Lions	21	(1)
2023	Hunan Billows	6	(3)
2023	Nanjing City	8	(0)
2024	Hunan Billows	24	(6)

International career
2009–2010	China U23		

Managerial career
- 2025–: Changchun Yatai U21 (assistant)
- * Club domestic league appearances and goals as of 31 January 2025

Jiang Zhe (Chinese: 蒋哲; pinyin: Jiǎng Zhé, born 26 February 1989 in Dalian) is a Chinese retired football player who played as a defender or midfielder.

== Club career ==
Jiang started his professional football career in 2006 when he was promoted to Harbin Yiteng's first team for the 2006 China League Two campaign. He made an impression within the team as Harbin Yiteng won promotion to the second tier at the end of the season by finishing second place of the league.

In July 2010, Jiang transferred to Chinese Super League side Changchun Yatai in a three-way trade with Dalian Shide that Dalian Shide sent Zou Jie to Dalian Yiteng and Changchun Yatai sent Yan Feng to Dalian Shide. He made his debut for Changchun on 28 July, in a 2–1 away defeat against Dalian Shide, coming on as a substitute for Lee Se-In in the 77th minute. On 18 May 2013, he scored his first Super League goal against Dalian Aerbin in the 89th minute, which ensured Changchun's 2–2 draw.

On 12 February 2019, Jiang transferred to fellow Super League side Chongqing Lifan. He would make his debut for the club in a league game on 2 March 2019 against Guangzhou R&F in 2–2 draw. After two seasons with Chongqing he would briefly return to Changchun on loan throughout the 2021 Chinese Super League campaign. On 28 April 2022, Jiang joined top-tier club Cangzhou Mighty Lions for the 2022 Chinese Super League campaign. He would make his debut for them in a league game on 12 June 2022 against Chengdu Rongcheng in a 0–0 draw.

After Hunan Billows was out of professional league in 2025, Jiang announced his retirement in social media.

== Career statistics ==
Statistics accurate as of match played 31 January 2025.

Appearances and goals by club, season and competition
Club	Season	League			National Cup		Continental		Other		Total	
Club	Season	Division	Apps	Goals	Apps	Goals	Apps	Goals	Apps	Goals	Apps	Goals
Harbin Yiteng	2006	China League Two			-		-		-			
Harbin Yiteng	2007	China League One	10	0	-		-		-		10	0
Harbin Yiteng	2008	China League One	3	0	-		-		-		3	0
Harbin Yiteng	2009	China League Two		4	-		-		-			4
Harbin Yiteng	2010	China League Two		1	-		-		-			1
Harbin Yiteng	Total		13	5	0	0	0	0	0	0	13	5
Changchun Yatai	2010	Chinese Super League	4	0	-		-		-		4	0
Changchun Yatai	2011	Chinese Super League	1	0	0	0	-		-		1	0
Changchun Yatai	2012	Chinese Super League	9	0	1	0	-		-		10	0
Changchun Yatai	2013	Chinese Super League	17	1	2	0	-		-		19	1
Changchun Yatai	2014	Chinese Super League	11	0	1	1	-		-		12	1
Changchun Yatai	2015	Chinese Super League	29	2	1	0	-		-		30	0
Changchun Yatai	2016	Chinese Super League	22	0	0	0	-		-		22	0
Changchun Yatai	2017	Chinese Super League	26	1	0	0	-		-		26	1
Changchun Yatai	2018	Chinese Super League	23	0	0	0	-		-		23	0
Changchun Yatai	Total		142	4	5	1	0	0	0	0	147	5
Chongqing Lifan	2019	Chinese Super League	25	1	1	0	-		-		26	1
Chongqing Lifan	2020	Chinese Super League	17	0	0	0	-		-		17	0
Chongqing Lifan	Total		42	1	1	0	0	0	0	0	43	1
Changchun Yatai (loan)	2021	Chinese Super League	9	0	2	0	-		-		11	0
Cangzhou Mighty Lions	2022	Chinese Super League	21	1	0	0	-		-		21	1
Hunan Billows	2023	China League Two	6	3	3	1	-		-		9	4
Nanjing City	2023	China League One	8	0	0	0	-		-		8	0
Hunan Billows	2024	China League Two	24	6	1	0	-		-		25	6
Career total			265	20	12	2	0	0	0	0	277	22
