= Wang Wenxuan =

Chinese association football player

Personal information
- Date of birth: 26 December 1999 (age 26)
- Place of birth: Jingdezhen, Jiangxi, China
- Height: 1.83 m (6 ft 0 in)
- Position: Defender

Team information
- Current team: Dalian K'un City
- Number: 2

Youth career
- 2012–2015: Villarreal
- –2021: Guangzhou Evergrande

Senior career*
Years	Team	Apps	(Gls)
2020–2024	Guangzhou FC	44	(0)
2020	→ Inner Mongolia Zhongyou (loan)	10	(0)
2025	Chongqing Tonglianglong	24	(0)
2026–	Dalian K'un City	0	(0)
- * Club domestic league appearances and goals as of 14:01, 1 March 2026 (UTC)

Wang Wenxuan (Chinese: 王文轩; born 26 December 1999) is a Chinese footballer currently playing as a defender for Dalian K'un City.

== Club career ==
Wang Wenxuan would be promoted to the senior team of Guangzhou FC before being loaned out to second-tier football club Inner Mongolia Zhongyou for the 2020 China League Two season. He would make his debut in a league game on 13 September 2020 against Beijing BSU in a 1–0 defeat. On his return to Guangzhou he would make his debut in an AFC Champions League game on 24 June 2021 against Cerezo Osaka in a 2–0 defeat.

With the clubs majority shareholder in financial trouble Guangzhou would start to lose several key players, the team was relegated from the Super League in 2022, ending their twelve-season stay in the top flight. Wang would remain with the team and go on to establish himself as a regular within the club as he helped guide them to a twelfth-placed finish.

== Career statistics ==
As of 1 March 2026.

Club	Season	League			Cup		Continental		Other		Total	
Club	Season	Division	Apps	Goals	Apps	Goals	Apps	Goals	Apps	Goals	Apps	Goals
Guangzhou FC	2020	Chinese Super League	0	0	0	0	0 (Note: Appearances in the AFC Champions League)	0	–		0	0
Guangzhou FC	2021	Chinese Super League	0	0	1	0	6	0	–		7	0
Guangzhou FC	2022	Chinese Super League	1	0	2	0	0	0	–		3	0
Guangzhou FC	2023	China League One	22	0	2	0	–		–		24	0
Guangzhou FC	2024	China League One	21	0	1	0	–		–		22	0
Guangzhou FC	Total		44	0	6	0	6	0	0	0	56	0
Inner Mongolia Zhongyou (loan)	2020	China League One	10	0	0	0	–		–		10	0
Chongqing Tonglianglong	2025	China League One	24	0	2	0	–		–		26	0
Dalian K'un City	2026	China League One	0	0	0	0	–		–		0	0
Career total			78	0	8	0	6	0	0	0	92	0
