= Suzhou Dongwu F.C. =

Chinese football club

Suzhou Dongwu
- Full name: Suzhou Dongwu Football Club
- Founded: 29 May 2008; 18 years ago
- Ground: Suzhou Sports Centre Stadium
- Capacity: 35,000
- Chairman: Yu Shichang
- Manager: Guo Hui
- League: China League One
- 2025: China League One, 10th of 16
Home colours	Away colours

Suzhou Dongwu Football Club (Chinese: 苏州东吴足球俱乐部; pinyin: Sūzhōu Dōngwú Zúqiú Jùlèbù) is a Chinese professional football club based in Suzhou, Jiangsu, that competes in China League One, the second tier of Chinese football. Suzhou Dongwu plays its home matches at the Suzhou Sports Center, located within Gusu District.

== History ==
Suzhou Jinfu F.C. logo used in 2008

The club was established on 29 May 2008 as an amateur club named Suzhou Jinfu F.C. (Simplified Chinese: 苏州锦富). They are among the most successful amateur football clubs in the country, which have won China Amateur Football League in 2012 and, after changing their name to Suzhou Dongwu, again in 2015–––the latter of which would earn them promotion to 2016 China League Two. At the beginning of the 2018 league season the club would change the team's crest and colours from yellow to red with black stripes.

Suzhou Dongwu F.C. logo used in 2016

In the 2019 China League Two season the club finished fourth and despite this not being enough to gain promotion, China League One side Sichuan Longfor disbanded due to financial problems and Suzhou were promoted to the 2020 China League One.

== Name history ==
- 2008–2014 Suzhou Jinfu F.C. 苏州锦富
- 2015– Suzhou Dongwu F.C. 苏州东吴

== Players ==
=== Current squad ===
As of July 2026

Note: Flags indicate national team as defined under FIFA eligibility rules; some limited exceptions apply. Players may hold more than one non-FIFA nationality.

No.	Pos.	Nation	Player
1	GK	CHN	Liu Yu
2	DF	CHN	Song Bowei
5	DF	CHN	Wang Yulong
6	MF	ANG	Estrela
7	MF	BRA	Farley Rosa
8	FW	CHN	Gao Dalun
9	FW	CHN	Mirzat Ali
11	MF	CHN	Gong Yunyang
14	FW	LBN	Omar Bugiel
15	MF	CHN	Jin Qiang
16	MF	CHN	Zhao Shenao
17	MF	CHN	Wang Jiancong
18	FW	CHN	Tai Jianfeng
19	FW	CHN	Wu Junjie
20	MF	CHN	Chen Rong

No.	Pos.	Nation	Player
21	MF	CHN	Song Pan (on loan from Chongqing Tonglianglong)
24	DF	CHN	Zhang Jiansheng
25	FW	CHN	Yu Zhuowei
26	FW	CHN	Wang Binhan
27	GK	CHN	Lei Zhibo
28	MF	CHN	Jin Shang
30	FW	CHN	He Haohan
33	DF	CHN	Liu Jiqiang
36	DF	CHN	Yuan Junjie
37	GK	CHN	Askhan
39	DF	CHN	Tian Jiahao
42	MF	CHN	Ghenifa Arafat
45	DF	CHN	Mustahan Mijit

== Coaching staff ==
Position	Staff
Head coach	(China) Guo Hui
Assistant coach	(China) Zhang Zeyuan
Assistant coach	(China) Deng Feilong
Goalkeeping coach	(China) Kang Yanlin

Source: CFA

== Managerial history ==
- (China) Tang Bo (2012–2016)
- (Japan) Kazuo Uchida (2017–2018)
- (China) Liu Junwei (2019–2020)
- (England) Gary White (2020–2022)
- (China) Lu Bofei (2022–2023)
- (China) Niu Hongli (2023)
- (South Korea) Kim Dae-eui (2024-2025)
- (Spain) Sergio Zarco Díaz (2025)
- (China) Yu Yuanwei (2026)
- (China) Guo Hui (2026–present)

== Results ==
All-time league rankings

As of the end of 2018 season.

Year	Div	Pld	W	D	L	GF	GA	GD	Pts	Pos.	FA Cup	Super Cup	AFC	Att./G	Stadium
2012	4									W	DNQ	DNQ	DNQ		
2013	4									10	R1	DNQ	DNQ		
2014	–	–	–	–	–	–	–	–	-	–	R4	DNQ	DNQ		Kunshan Sports Centre Stadium
2015	4									W	R2	DNQ	DNQ		Suzhou University Stadium
2016	3	20	4	7	9	12	20	−8	19	14	R2	DNQ	DNQ	728	Kunshan Sports Centre Stadium
2017	3	24	12	5	7	28	16	12	41	11	R4	DNQ	DNQ	1,115	Suzhou Sports Center
2018	3	28	10	10	8	27	31	−4	40	12	R4	DNQ	DNQ	2,062	Suzhou Sports Center
2019	3	30	21	4	5	54	17	37	67	4	R1	DNQ	DNQ		Suzhou Sports Center
2020	2	15	4	3	8	12	20	-8	15	10	R2	DNQ	DNQ		Suzhou Sports Center
2021	2	34	7	11	16	36	53	-17	32	13	R3	DNQ	DNQ		Suzhou Sports Center
2022	2	34	16	7	11	42	33	9	55	6	R3	DNQ	DNQ		Suzhou Olympic Sports Centre

Key

	China top division
	China second division
	China third division
	China fourth division
W	Winners
RU	Runners-up
3	Third place
	Relegated

- Pld = Played
- W = Games won
- D = Games drawn
- L = Games lost
- F = Goals for
- A = Goals against
- Pts = Points
- Pos = Final position
- DNQ = Did not qualify
- DNE = Did not enter
- NH = Not Held
- – = Does Not Exist
- R1 = Round 1
- R2 = Round 2
- R3 = Round 3
- R4 = Round 4
- F = Final
- SF = Semi-finals
- QF = Quarter-finals
- R16 = Round of 16
- Group = Group stage
- GS2 = Second Group stage
- QR1 = First Qualifying Round
- QR2 = Second Qualifying Round
- QR3 = Third Qualifying Round
