= Zhang Hongjiang (footballer) =

Chinese association football player

Zhang Hongjiang 张宏疆
Personal information
- Date of birth: 13 June 1997 (age 29)
- Place of birth: Panjin, Liaoning, China
- Height: 1.80 m (5 ft 11 in)
- Position: Defender

Team information
- Current team: Dalian K'un City
- Number: 27

Youth career
- Dalian Shide
- 2016–2017: Gondomar

Senior career*
Years	Team	Apps	(Gls)
2013	Liaoning Youth	2	(1)
2014–2015	Dalian Transcendence	22	(0)
2016–2017	Gondomar	1	(0)
2017	→ Meizhou Hakka (loan)	26	(0)
2018–2019	Meizhou Hakka	55	(0)
2021	Zibo Cuju	19	(0)
2022	Chongqing Liangjiang	0	(0)
2022	Zibo Qisheng	15	(0)
2023–2024	Dalian Yingbo	30	(0)
2024	Guangdong GZ-Power	3	(0)
2025	Wenzhou FC	20	(0)
2026–	Dalian K'un City	0	(0)

International career
2015–2016	China U-20		
- * Club domestic league appearances and goals as of 1 March 2026

Zhang Hongjiang (Chinese: 张宏疆; born 13 June 1997) is a Chinese footballer who plays for Dalian K'un City.

== Club career ==
Zhang Hongjiang joined Portuguese Second Division side Gondomar from Dalian Transcendence in 2016. He was officially promoted to the first team squad in the summer of 2016 before making his debut in a league game against S.C. Salgueiros on 29 January 2017 in a 3–1 defeat.

In 2017, Zhang was loaned to China League One side Meizhou Hakka. In 2018, Zhang permanently transferred to Meizhou Hakka. In his first permanent full season at the club he would personally go on to win Young Player of the Season award at the end of the 2018 China League One season.

On 9 February 2026, Zhang signed with China League One side Dalian K'un City.

== Career statistics ==
As of 1 March 2026.

Club	Season	League			National Cup		Continental		Other		Total	
Club	Season	Division	Apps	Goals	Apps	Goals	Apps	Goals	Apps	Goals	Apps	Goals
Liaoning Youth	2013	China League Two	2	1	-		-		-		2	1
Dalian Transcendence	2014	China League Two	12	0	0	0	-		-		12	0
Dalian Transcendence	2015	China League Two	10	0	1	0	-		-		11	0
Dalian Transcendence	Total		22	0	1	0	0	0	0	0	23	0
Gondomar	2016–17	Campeonato de Portugal	1	0	0	0	-		-		1	0
Meizhou Hakka (loan)	2017	China League One	26	0	0	0	-		-		26	0
Meizhou Hakka	2018	China League One	29	0	0	0	-		-		29	0
Meizhou Hakka	2019	China League One	26	0	1	0	-		-		27	0
Meizhou Hakka	2020	China League One	0	0	0	0	-		-		0	0
Meizhou Hakka	Total		55	0	1	0	0	0	0	0	56	0
Zibo Cuju	2021	China League One	19	0	1	0	-		-		20	0
Zibo Qisheng	2021	China League Two	15	0	-		-		-		15	0
Dalian Yingbo	2023	China League Two	21	0	2	0	-		-		23	0
Dalian Yingbo	2024	China League One	9	0	1	0	-		-		10	0
Dalian Yingbo	Total		30	0	3	0	0	0	0	0	33	0
Guangdong GZ-Power	2024	China League Two	3	0	-		-		-		3	0
Wenzhou FC	2025	China League Two	20	0	2	0	-		-		22	0
Career total			193	1	8	0	0	0	0	0	201	1
