= Gao Dalun =

Chinese association football player

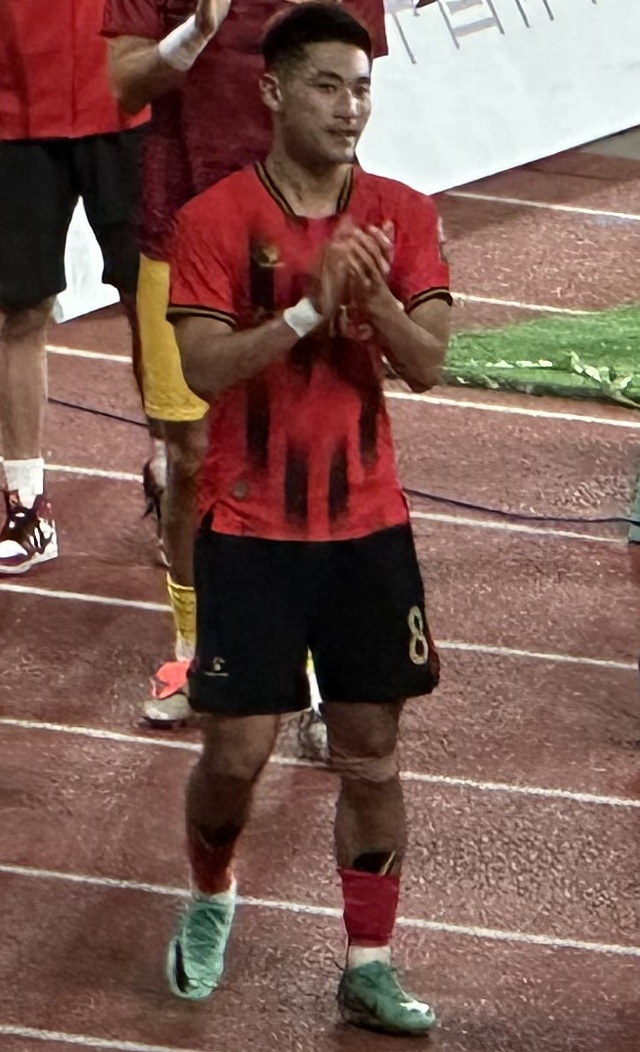
- Gao Dalun in May 2025

Personal information
- Date of birth: 7 March 1997 (age 29)
- Place of birth: Xuzhou, Jiangsu, China
- Height: 1.76 m (5 ft 9 in)
- Position: Left winger

Team information
- Current team: Suzhou Dongwu
- Number: 8

Youth career
- –2020: Jiangsu Suning

Senior career*
Years	Team	Apps	(Gls)
2018–2020	Jiangsu Suning	0	(0)
2021–2022	Nantong Zhiyun	51	(1)
2023–	Suzhou Dongwu	26	(2)
- * Club domestic league appearances and goals as of 14:01, 31 December 2022 (UTC)

Gao Dalun (Chinese: 高大伦; born 7 March 1997) is a Chinese footballer currently playing as a left winger for Suzhou Dongwu.

== Club career ==
Gao Dalun would play for the Jiangsu Suning youth team before going on to be promoted to their senior team. He would even be part of the squad that won the 2020 Chinese Super League title. His time at the club would end when the clubs owners were in financial difficulties and dissolved the team. He would go on to join second tier club Nantong Zhiyun and go on to make his debut in a league game on 16 May 2021 against Chengdu Rongcheng in a 2-1 defeat. He would go on to establish himself within the team and helped the club gain promotion to the top tier at the end of the 2022 China League One season.

== Career statistics ==
As of 31 December 2022.

Club	Season	League			Cup		Continental		Other		Total	
Club	Season	Division	Apps	Goals	Apps	Goals	Apps	Goals	Apps	Goals	Apps	Goals
Jiangsu	2018	Chinese Super League	0	0	0	0	–		–		0	0
Jiangsu	2019	Chinese Super League	0	0	0	0	–		–		0	0
Jiangsu	2020	Chinese Super League	0	0	0	0	–		–		0	0
Jiangsu	Total		0	0	0	0	0	0	0	0	0	0
Nantong Zhiyun	2021	China League One	22	1	1	0	–		–		23	1
Nantong Zhiyun	2022	China League One	29	0	1	0	–		–		30	0
Nantong Zhiyun	Total		51	1	2	0	0	0	0	0	53	1
Career total			51	1	2	0	0	0	0	0	53	1

== Honours ==
=== Club ===
Jiangsu Suning

- Chinese Super League: 2020
