= Han Xue =

Han Xue, Hanxue, or variation, may refer to:

- Han Xue (swimmer) (韓雪, born 1981), Chinese Swimmer
- Han Xue (actress) (韩雪, born 1983), Chinese Singer and actress
- Han learning or Hanxue (Chinese: 漢學)

== See also ==
- Xue
- Han (disambiguation)
- Han Xu (disambiguation)
- Han shu (disambiguation)
