= Chang Lin (footballer) =

Chinese footballer

Chang Lin 常琳
Personal information
- Full name: Chang Lin
- Date of birth: April 17, 1981 (age 45)
- Place of birth: Dalian, Liaoning, China
- Height: 1.84 m (6 ft 0 in)
- Position: Midfielder

Team information
- Current team: Dalian K'un City (assistant coach)

Youth career
- 2000: Dalian Shide

Senior career*
| Years | Team | Apps | (Gls) |
| 2001–2002 | Dalian Sidelong | ? | (?) |
| 2003–2006 | Shanghai United | 90 | (10) |
| 2007 | Shanghai Shenhua | 15 | (0) |
| 2008–2009 | Hangzhou Greentown | 38 | (0) |
| 2010–2012 | Dalian Aerbin | 46 | (6) |
| 2013 | Shijiazhuang Yongchang Junhao | 8 | (0) |
| 2013 | → Meizhou Kejia (loan) | ? | (2) |

Managerial career
- 2022–2023: Dalian Pro (assistant)
- 2024–2025: Changchun Yatai (team manager)
- 2026–: Dalian K'un City (assistant)
- * Club domestic league appearances and goals as of 27 November 2012

Chang Lin (Chinese: 常琳; born April 17, 1981, in Dalian) is a Chinese former footballer.

== Career statistics ==
(Correct as of 2013)

| Season | Club | League | League | | CFA Cup | | CSL Cup | | Asia | | Total | |
| Season | Club | League | Apps | Goals | Apps | Goals | Apps | Goals | Apps | Goals | Apps | Goals |
|---|---|---|---|---|---|---|---|---|---|---|---|---|
| 2001 | Dalian Sidelong | China League Two | ? | ? | - | - | - | - | - | - | >=0 | >=0 |
| 2002 | Dalian Sidelong | Chinese Jia-B League | ? | 1 | ? | ? | - | - | - | - | >=0 | >=1 |
| 2003 | Zhuhai Anping | Chinese Jia-B League | 24 | 2 | ? | ? | - | - | - | - | >=24 | >=2 |
| 2004 | Zhuhai Zobon | China League One | 27 | 6 | 1 | 0 | - | - | - | - | 28 | 6 |
| 2005 | Shanghai Zobon | Chinese Super League | 12 | 0 | 1 | 0 | 1 | 0 | - | - | 14 | 0 |
| 2006 | Shanghai United | Chinese Super League | 27 | 2 | 1 | 1 | - | - | - | - | 28 | 3 |
| 2007 | Shanghai Shenhua | Chinese Super League | 15 | 0 | - | - | - | - | 4 | 0 | 19 | 0 |
| 2008 | Zhejiang Green Town | Chinese Super League | 22 | 0 | - | - | - | - | - | - | 22 | 0 |
| 2009 | Hangzhou Greentown | Chinese Super League | 16 | 0 | - | - | - | - | - | - | 16 | 0 |
| 2010 | Dalian Aerbin | China League Two | 18 | 4 | - | - | - | - | - | - | 18 | 4 |
| 2011 | Dalian Aerbin | China League One | 20 | 1 | 2 | 0 | - | - | - | - | 22 | 1 |
| 2012 | Dalian Aerbin | Chinese Super League | 5 | 1 | 1 | 0 | - | - | - | - | 6 | 1 |
| 2013 | Shijiazhuang Yongchang Junhao | China League One | 8 | 0 | 1 | 0 | - | - | - | - | 9 | 0 |
| 2013 | Meizhou Kejia | China League Two | ? | 2 | 0 | 0 | - | - | - | - | ? | 2 |
| Total | | | >=194 | >=19 | >=7 | >=1 | 1 | 0 | 4 | 0 | >=206 | >=20 |

== Honors ==
Dalian Sidelong

- China League Two: 2001

Dalian Aerbin

- China League Two: 2010
- China League One: 2011
