= Han Xu (footballer) =

Chinese footballer (born 1988)

Han Xu 韩旭
Personal information
- Date of birth: April 21, 1988 (age 38)
- Place of birth: Dalian, Liaoning, China
- Height: 1.82 m (5 ft 11 1/2 in)
- Position: Midfielder

Youth career
- Harbin Yiteng

Senior career*
Years	Team	Apps	(Gls)
2006–2015	Harbin Yiteng	106	(5)
2016	Dalian Transcendence	30	(1)
2017	Dalian Yifang	22	(0)
2018–2019	Meixian Techand	41	(0)
2020–2021	Nanjing City	40	(1)
2022–2023	Dalian Zhixing	4	(0)
2024	Dalian K'un City	20	(2)
Total		263	(9)
- * Club domestic league appearances and goals as of 31 December 2020

Han Xu (Chinese: 韩旭; born 21 April 1988) is a Chinese former football player.

On 10 September 2024, Chinese Football Association announced that Han was banned from football-related activities for lifetime for involving in match-fixing.

== Club career ==
In 2006, Han Xu started his professional footballer career with Harbin Yiteng in the China League Two division. Han would be part of the team that gained promotion to the top tier of Chinese football. He would eventually make his Chinese Super League debut for Harbin on 7 March 2014 in a game against Shandong Luneng Taishan, coming on as a substitute for Dorielton in the 83rd minute in game that ended in a 1–0 defeat. The club would be relegated from the top tier at the end of the season after finishing bottom of the league.

On 6 January 2016, Han transferred to his hometown club China League One side Dalian Transcendence. After immediately establishing himself as an integral member of their team in February 2017, Han transferred to fellow China League One club Dalian Yifang. He would go on to win the 2017 China League One division with the club.

On 28 February 2018, Han transferred to Meixian Techand.

== Career statistics ==
Statistics accurate as of match played 7 September 2024.

Appearances and goals by club, season and competition
Club	Season	League			National Cup		Continental		Other		Total	
Club	Season	Division	Apps	Goals	Apps	Goals	Apps	Goals	Apps	Goals	Apps	Goals
Harbin Yiteng	2006	China League Two			-		-		-			
Harbin Yiteng	2007	China League One	20	0	-		-		-		20	0
Harbin Yiteng	2008	China League One	6	0	-		-		-		6	0
Harbin Yiteng	2009	China League Two			-		-		-			
Harbin Yiteng	2010	China League Two			-		-		-			
Harbin Yiteng	2011	China League Two	15	2	-		-		-		15	2
Harbin Yiteng	2012	China League One	18	1	1	0	-		-		19	1
Harbin Yiteng	2013	China League One	15	0	1	0	-		-		16	0
Harbin Yiteng	2014	Chinese Super League	14	0	0	0	-		-		14	0
Harbin Yiteng	2015	China League One	18	2	0	0	-		-		18	2
Harbin Yiteng	Total		106	5	2	0	0	0	0	0	108	5
Dalian Transcendence	2016	China League One	30	1	0	0	-		-		30	1
Dalian Yifang	2017	China League One	22	0	1	0	-		-		23	0
Meixian Techand	2018	China League One	28	0	0	0	-		2 (Note: Appearances in China League One play-offs)	0	30	0
Meixian Techand	2019	China League One	13	0	0	0	-		-		13	0
Meixian Techand	Total		41	0	0	0	0	0	2	0	43	0
Nanjing City	2020	China League Two	11	1	-		-		-		11	1
Nanjing City	2021	China League One	21	0	0	0	-		-		21	0
Nanjing City	2022	China League One	8	0	0	0	-		-		8	0
Nanjing City	Total		40	1	0	0	0	0	0	0	40	1
Dalian Duxing/ Dalian Zhixing	2022	Chinese Champions League			-		-		-			
Dalian Duxing/ Dalian Zhixing	2023	China League Two	4	0	2	0	-		-		6	0
Dalian Duxing/ Dalian Zhixing	Total		4	0	2	0	0	0	0	0	6	0
Dalian K'un City	2024	China League One	20	2	1	1	-		-		21	3
Career total			263	9	6	1	0	0	2	0	271	10

== Honours ==
=== Club ===
Harbin Yiteng

- China League Two: 2011

Dalian Yifang

- China League One: 2017
