= Lei Wenjie =

Chinese footballer (born 1997)

Lei Wenjie 雷文杰
Personal information
- Full name: Lei Wenjie
- Date of birth: 2 January 1997 (age 29)
- Place of birth: Nanchang, Jiangxi, China
- Height: 1.84 m (6 ft 1/2 in)
- Position: Midfielder

Team information
- Current team: Dalian K'un City
- Number: 39

Youth career
- Shanghai Luckystar
- 2014–2016: Shanghai SIPG

Senior career*
Years	Team	Apps	(Gls)
2017–2024	Shanghai Port	22	(1)
2021–2022	→ Nantong Zhiyun (loan)	49	(9)
2023–2024	→ Qingdao West Coast (loan)	50	(3)
2025–	Dalian K'un City	0	(0)

International career^{‡}
2017–2019	China U-23	9	(0)
- * Club domestic league appearances and goals as of 08 July 2024 ‡ National team caps and goals as of 18 February 2019

Lei Wenjie (simplified Chinese: 雷文杰; traditional Chinese: 雷文傑; pinyin: Léi Wénjié; born 2 January 1997) is a Chinese footballer who currently plays for Dalian K'un City.

== Club career ==
Lei Wenjie joined Chinese Super League side Shanghai SIPG's youth academy in November 2014 when Shanghai SIPG bought Shanghai Luckystar's youth team. He was promoted to the first team squad by André Villas-Boas in the 2017 season. On 17 July 2018, Lei made his senior debut in a 1–1 away draw against Shandong Luneng Taishan, coming on as a substitute for Wu Lei in the 88th minute. He scored his first senior goal in his second appearance on 28 July 2018, in a 5–1 away win over Beijing Renhe.

On 28 July 2021, Lei would be loaned out to second tier club Nantong Zhiyun and would go on to make his debut in a league game on 31 July 2021 against Heilongjiang Ice City in a 0-0 draw. The following season he would be loaned out to Nantong again and would go on to establish himself within the team and helped the club gain promotion to the top tier at the end of the 2022 China League One season.

On 4 January 2025, Lei joined China League One side Dalian K'un City.

== Career statistics ==
As of 8 July 2024.

Appearances and goals by club, season and competition
Club	Season	League			National Cup		Continental		Other		Total	
Club	Season	Division	Apps	Goals	Apps	Goals	Apps	Goals	Apps	Goals	Apps	Goals
Shanghai SIPG	2017	Chinese Super League	0	0	0	0	0	0	-		0	0
Shanghai SIPG	2018	Chinese Super League	13	1	0	0	0	0	-		13	1
Shanghai SIPG	2019	Chinese Super League	7	0	1	0	1	0	0 (Note: Appearances in Chinese FA Super Cup)	0	9	0
Shanghai SIPG	2020	Chinese Super League	2	0	0	0	5	0	-		7	0
Shanghai SIPG	Total		22	1	1	0	6	0	0	0	29	1
Nantong Zhiyun (loan)	2021	China League One	18	4	1	0	–		–		19	4
Nantong Zhiyun (loan)	2022	China League One	31	4	0	0	–		–		31	4
Nantong Zhiyun (loan)	Total		49	8	1	0	0	0	0	0	50	8
Qingdao West Coast (loan)	2023	China League One	26	2	2	0	–		–		28	2
Qingdao West Coast (loan)	2024	Chinese Super League	16	1	0	0	–		–		16	1
Qingdao West Coast (loan)	Total		42	3	2	0	0	0	0	0	44	3
Career total			113	12	4	0	6	0	0	0	123	12

== Honours ==
=== Club ===
Shanghai SIPG

- Chinese Super League: 2018
- Chinese FA Super Cup: 2019
