= Guo Hui =

Chinese association football player

Personal information
- Date of birth: 9 April 1978 (age 48)
- Place of birth: Beijing, China
- Height: 1.77 m (5 ft 10 in)
- Position: Midfielder

Senior career*
Years	Team	Apps	(Gls)
1996–2003	Bayi Xiangtan	120	(29)
2004–2006	Liaoning FC	59	(18)
2007–2009	Beijing Guoan	46	(13)
2010–2011	Dalian Aerbin	26	(14)
Total		251	(74)

Managerial career
- 2015: Dalian Aerbin (assistant)
- 2016–2017: Vejle Boldklub (assistant)
- 2019–2022: Guangzhou R&F U19
- 2023: Dalian Pro U21
- 2025–: Suzhou Dongwu (general manager)
- 2026–: Suzhou Dongwu
Medal record
Men's football
Representing China
East Asian Games
Bronze medal – third place	1997 Busan	Football
AFC Youth Championship
Silver medal – second place	1996 َ South Korea	Team
- * Club domestic league appearances and goals

Guo Hui (simplified Chinese: 郭辉; traditional Chinese: 郭輝; pinyin: Guō Huī; born 9 April 1978) is a Chinese football manager and former footballer.

On 14 October 2025, Guo was named as the general manager of China League One club Suzhou Dongwu.

== Career statistics ==
=== Club ===
Club	Season	League			Cup		Continental		Other		Total	
Club	Season	Division	Apps	Goals	Apps	Goals	Apps	Goals	Apps	Goals	Apps	Goals
Bayi Xiangtan	1996	Jia-A League	5	1	–		–		0	0	5	1
Bayi Xiangtan	1997	Jia-A League	4	0	–		–		0	0	4	0
Bayi Xiangtan	1998	Jia-A League	2	0	–		–		0	0	2	0
Bayi Xiangtan	1999	Jia-B League	22	5	–		–		0	0	22	5
Bayi Xiangtan	2000	Jia-B League	20	10	–		–		0	0	20	10
Bayi Xiangtan	2001	Jia-A League	22	6	–		–		0	0	22	6
Bayi Xiangtan	2002	Jia-A League	24	6	–		–		0	0	24	6
Bayi Xiangtan	2003	Jia-A League	21	1	–		–		0	0	21	1
Bayi Xiangtan	Total		120	29	0	0	0	0	0	0	120	29
Liaoning FC	2004	Chinese Super League	17	8	–		–		0	0	20	0
Liaoning FC	2005	Chinese Super League	19	3	–		–		0	0	20	0
Liaoning FC	2005	Chinese Super League	23	7	–		–		0	0	23	7
Liaoning FC	Total		59	18	0	0	0	0	0	0	59	18
Beijing Guoan	2007	Chinese Super League	21	8	–		–		0	0	21	8
Beijing Guoan	2008	Chinese Super League	22	5	–		1 (Note: Appearances in the AFC Champions League)	1	0	0	23	6
Beijing Guoan	2009	Chinese Super League	3	0	–		4	1	0	0	7	1
Beijing Guoan	Total		46	13	0	0	5	1	0	0	51	15
Dalian Aerbin	2010	China League Two	17	11	–		–		0	0	17	11
Dalian Aerbin	2011	China League One	9	3	–		–		0	0	9	3
Dalian Aerbin	Total		26	14	0	0	1	0	0	0	26	14
Career total			251	74	0	0	5	1	0	0	256	76
