= Luo Hao =

Chinese footballer (born 1995)

Luo Hao 罗皓
Personal information
- Date of birth: 17 January 1995 (age 31)
- Place of birth: Shenyang, Liaoning, China
- Height: 1.86 m (6 ft 1 in)
- Position: Defender

Team information
- Current team: Chongqing Dangdai Lifan
- Number: 4

Youth career
- 2004–2009: Shenyang Xinyuanxiang
- 2010–2013: Yunnan Youth
- 2014–2015: Guangzhou R&F

Senior career*
| Years | Team | Apps | (Gls) |
| 2016–2017 | Nei Mongol Zhongyou | 39 | (0) |
| 2018– | Chongqing Dangdai | 48 | (1) |
- * Club domestic league appearances and goals as of 31 December 2020

Luo Hao (Chinese: 罗皓; pinyin: Luó Hào; born 17 January 1995) is a Chinese footballer who currently plays for Chinese Super League side Chongqing Dangdai Lifan.

== Club career ==
Luo Hao joined Chinese League One club Nei Mongol Zhongyou in 2016. Luo made his senior debut on 11 May 2016 against top-tier giants Guangzhou Evergrande in the 2016 Chinese FA Cup. He was sent off during the match, which resulted Nei Mongol's 2–0 loss. On 4 June 2016, he made his league debut in a 1–0 win over Beijing Enterprises. He became a regular starter after the match until he suffered an arm fracture in October 2016, which ruling him out for the rest of the season. Luo returned to field in the 2017 season. He continued his promising performances in the league, making 23 appearances for the club.

On 2 January 2018, Luo transferred to Chinese Super League side Chongqing Dangdai Lifan. He made his debut for the club on 3 March 2018, playing the whole match in a 1–0 home win against Beijing Renhe. On 19 May 2018, he scored his first senior goal in a 2–1 away defeat against Hebei China Fortune.

== Career statistics ==
As of 31 December 2020.

Appearances and goals by club, season and competition
| Club | Season | League | | | National Cup | | Continental | | Other | | Total | |
| Club | Season | Division | Apps | Goals | Apps | Goals | Apps | Goals | Apps | Goals | Apps | Goals |
|---|---|---|---|---|---|---|---|---|---|---|---|---|
| Nei Mongol Zhongyou | 2016 | China League One | 16 | 0 | 1 | 0 | - | | - | | 17 | 0 |
| Nei Mongol Zhongyou | 2017 | China League One | 23 | 0 | 3 | 0 | - | | - | | 26 | 0 |
| Nei Mongol Zhongyou | Total | | 39 | 0 | 4 | 0 | 0 | 0 | 0 | 0 | 43 | 0 |
| Chongqing Dangdai | 2018 | Chinese Super League | 20 | 1 | 1 | 0 | - | | - | | 21 | 1 |
| Chongqing Dangdai | 2019 | Chinese Super League | 19 | 0 | 1 | 0 | - | | - | | 20 | 0 |
| Chongqing Dangdai | 2020 | Chinese Super League | 9 | 0 | 0 | 0 | - | | - | | 9 | 0 |
| Chongqing Dangdai | Total | | 48 | 1 | 2 | 0 | 0 | 0 | 0 | 0 | 50 | 1 |
| Career total | | | 87 | 1 | 6 | 0 | 0 | 0 | 0 | 0 | 93 | 1 |
