= Chen Lei (footballer) =

Chinese footballer (born 1985)

Chen Lei 陈雷
Personal information
- Date of birth: October 16, 1985 (age 41)
- Place of birth: Bengbu, Anhui, China
- Height: 1.80 m (5 ft 11 in)
- Positions: Defender; defensive midfielder

Youth career
- 2003–2005: Shanghai Shenhua

Senior career*
Years	Team	Apps	(Gls)
2006–2010	Shanghai Shenhua	31	(0)
2007–2008	→ Changchun Yatai (loan)	41	(2)
2009	→ Shenzhen Asia Travel (loan)	13	(0)
2011	Shenzhen Ruby	22	(0)
2012–2013	Dalian Aerbin	26	(0)
2014–2020	Chongqing Lifan	130	(4)
2022	Shanghai Jiading Huilong	7	(0)

International career^{‡}
2009	China	2	(0)

Managerial career
- 2022–2025: Shanghai Jiading Huilong (assistant)
- * Club domestic league appearances and goals as of 20 December 2023 ‡ National team caps and goals as of 12 August 2009

Chen Lei (simplified Chinese: 陈雷; traditional Chinese: 陳雷; pinyin: Chén Léi; born October 16, 1985, in Shanghai) is a former professional Chinese football player.

== Club career ==
Chen Lei made first competitive debut for Shanghai Shenhua in April 2006, aged 20 in a 1–0 defeat against Shenzhen Kingway. By the end of the season he was able to make four appearances for Shanghai, however at the beginning of the 2007 league there was an influx of players with the merger Shanghai United F.C. and Chen Lei went out on loan to Changchun Yatai for two seasons. At Changchun Yatai he gained considerably more playing time and helped the team to claim their first league title in his first season with them. He would return to Shanghai Shenhua at the beginning of the 2009 Chinese Super League season where he would gradually push for a place within the first team playing as a full back until Sun Xiang returned to the team after his loan move in Europe ended. After only making six league appearances Chen Lei was loaned out once more to this time Shenzhen Asia Travel until the end of the season. At the beginning of the 2010 league season Chen would return to Shanghai once his loan ended and claim his place back into the team due to the departure of Sun Xiang leaving the club. Chen transferred to another China League One club Chongqing Lifan in January 2014.

== International career ==
Chen Lei would make his debut in a friendly against Iran on 1 June 2009 in a 1–0 win, coming on as a substitute for Rong Hao.

== Career statistics ==
Statistics accurate as of match played 31 December 2020.

Appearances and goals by club, season and competition
Club	Season	League			National Cup		Continental		Other		Total	
Club	Season	Division	Apps	Goals	Apps	Goals	Apps	Goals	Apps	Goals	Apps	Goals
Shanghai Shenhua	2006	Chinese Super League	1	0	1	0	1	0	-		3	0
Shanghai Shenhua	2009	Chinese Super League	6	0	-		4	0	-		10	0
Shanghai Shenhua	2010	Chinese Super League	24	0	-		-		-		24	0
Shanghai Shenhua	Total		31	0	1	0	5	0	0	0	37	0
Changchun Yatai (loan)	2007	Chinese Super League	21	0	-		-		-		21	0
Changchun Yatai (loan)	2008	Chinese Super League	20	2	-		3	1	-		23	3
Changchun Yatai (loan)	Total		41	2	0	0	3	1	0	0	44	3
Shenzhen Ruby (loan)	2009	Chinese Super League	13	0	-		-		-		13	0
Shenzhen Ruby	2011	Chinese Super League	22	0	1	0	-		-		23	0
Dalian Aerbin	2012	Chinese Super League	13	0	1	0	-		-		14	0
Dalian Aerbin	2013	Chinese Super League	13	0	5	0	-		-		18	0
Dalian Aerbin	Total		26	0	6	0	0	0	0	0	32	0
Chongqing Lifan	2014	China League One	29	2	1	0	-		-		30	2
Chongqing Lifan	2015	Chinese Super League	24	2	1	0	-		-		25	2
Chongqing Lifan	2016	Chinese Super League	6	0	1	0	-		-		7	0
Chongqing Lifan	2017	Chinese Super League	26	0	0	0	-		-		26	0
Chongqing Lifan	2018	Chinese Super League	14	0	1	0	-		-		15	0
Chongqing Lifan	2019	Chinese Super League	23	0	1	0	-		-		24	0
Chongqing Lifan	2020	Chinese Super League	8	0	1	0	-		-		9	0
Chongqing Lifan	Total		130	4	6	0	0	0	0	0	136	4
Total			263	6	14	0	8	1	0	0	285	7

== Honours ==
=== Club ===
Changchun Yatai

- Chinese Super League: 2007

Chongqing Lifan

- China League One: 2014
