= Sui Weijie =

Chinese footballer

Sui Weijie 隋维杰
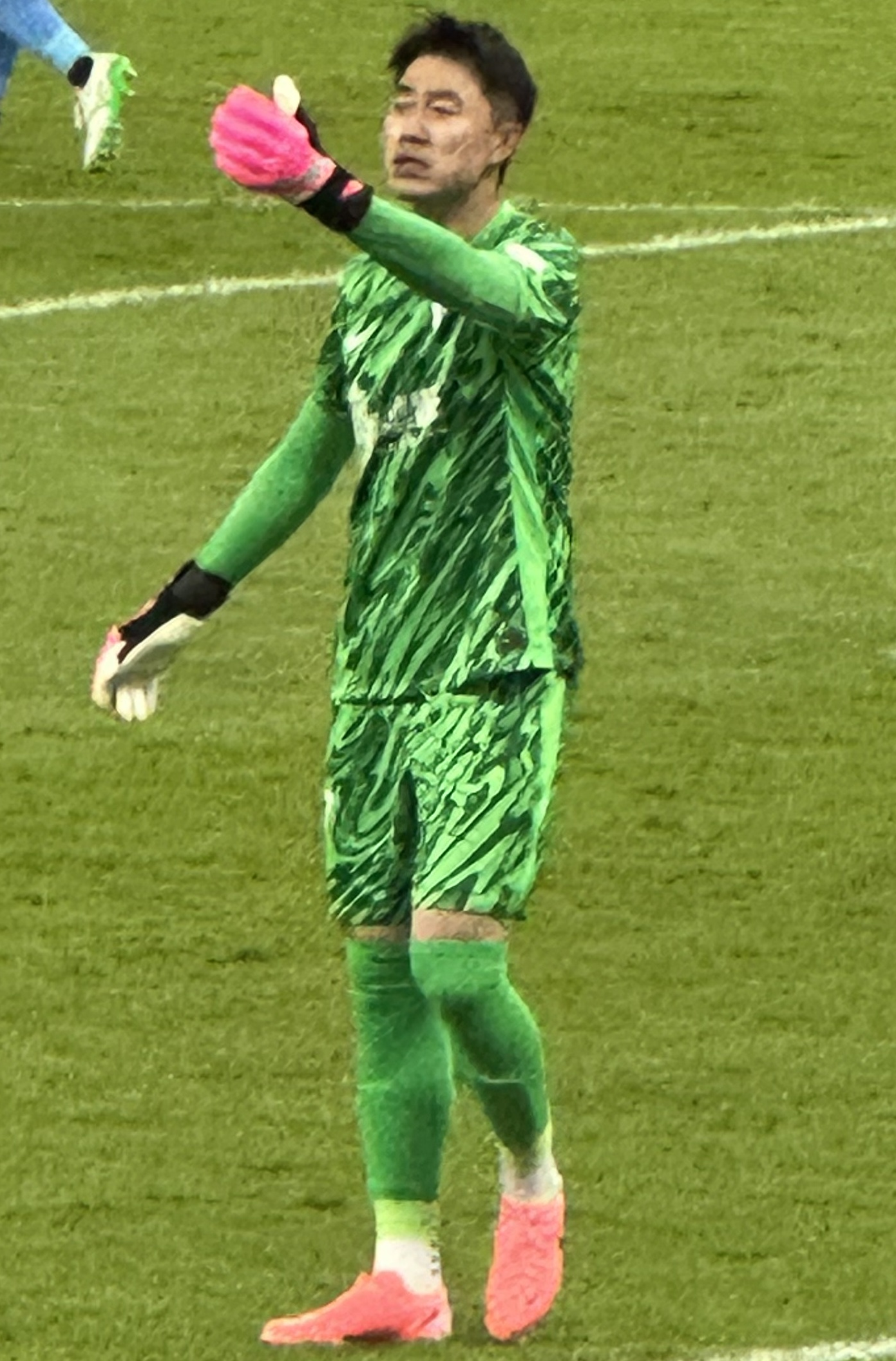
- Sui Weijie in April 2025

Personal information
- Full name: Sui Weijie
- Date of birth: 6 April 1983 (age 43)
- Place of birth: Dalian, Liaoning, China
- Height: 1.88 m (6 ft 2 in)
- Position: Goalkeeper

Team information
- Current team: Dalian K'un City
- Number: 17

Youth career
- Dalian Shide

Senior career*
Years	Team	Apps	(Gls)
2002–2003	Harbin Lange		
2004	Sichuan Jinying		
2005–2007	Happy Valley	12	(0)
2007–2008	Hong Kong Rangers	7	(0)
2008–2010	Fourway Rangers	32	(0)
2011	Fushun Xinye	15	(0)
2012–2013	Tianjin Songjiang	25	(0)
2013	→ Hebei Zhongji (loan)	12	(0)
2014–2020	Chongqing Lifan	109	(0)
2021	Shanxi Longjin	26	(0)
2022–2023	Shijiazhuang Gongfu	58	(0)
2024–2025	Dalian Yingbo	39	(0)
2026–	Dalian K'un City	0	(0)
- * Club domestic league appearances and goals as of 26 August 2025

Sui Weijie (simplified Chinese: 隋维杰; traditional Chinese: 隋維傑; pinyin: Suí Wéijié; born 6 April 1983) is a Chinese professional footballer who plays as a goalkeeper for China League One club Dalian K'un City.

== Club career ==
Sui started his football career with Harbin Lange and transferred to China League Two club Sichuan Jinying in 2004. He moved to Hong Kong in 2005 and played for Happy Valley, Bulova Rangers and Fourway Rangers successively. Sui was involved in match-fixing scandal when he played for Fourway Rangers and investigated by Independent Commission Against Corruption (ICAC) in 2010. He left Hong Kong without charge and joined China League Two club Fushun Xinye in 2011.

Sui moved to China League One side Tianjin Songjiang in February 2012 after playing at Fushun Xinye and failing to gain promotion to China League One. He was the key player of the club and set a new club record for consecutive clean sheets with 708 minutes in the 2012 season. Sui lost his position in the club after Pei Encai became the manager of Tianjin Songjiang in 2013. He was linked with League Two club Jiangxi Liansheng in July 2013; however, he was loaned to another League Two club Hebei Zhongji several days later. Sui played 12 matches for Hebei Zhongji, helping the club gain runners-up of the season and win promotion to China League One.

On 2 January 2014, Sui transferred to China League One side Chongqing Lifan. He became the first choice goalkeeper on the third matchday after Chongqing lost the first two matches of the season, helping the club to win a 27-match unbeaten run and promoted to Chinese Super League. Especially, Sui set a new China League One record for consecutive clean sheets with 796 minutes on 2 August 2014, beating the previous record of 732 minutes set by Yu Ziqian of Dalian Aerbin in the 2011 season. On 8 March 2015, Sui made his Super League debut in the season's first match which Chongqing Lifan lost to Beijing Guoan 3–0. On 24 May 2015, in a Super League match against Liaoning Whowin, he left his goal unguarded to take a water break after Chongqing Lifan conceded a free kick. Liaoning's Ding Haifeng took the free kick quickly and scored the equalizer as Sui was still drinking water next to the goal post. He was fined ¥50,000 by the club but kept his position as a main player. He played 28 league matches for the club in the 2015 season, as Chongqing Lifan secured to stay in the top flight for the next season. He became the second choice goalkeeper of the club after Deng Xiaofei joined Chongqing in 2016 season.

== Career statistics ==
Statistics accurate as of match played 30 April 2025.

Appearances and goals by club, season and competition
Club	Season	League			National Cup		League Cup		Continental		Other		Total	
Club	Season	Division	Apps	Goals	Apps	Goals	Apps	Goals	Apps	Goals	Apps	Goals	Apps	Goals
Harbin Lange	2002	Yi League			-		-		-		-			
Harbin Lange	2003	Jia B League	1	0			-		-		-		1	0
Harbin Lange	Total		1	0	0	0	0	0	0	0	0	0	1	0
Sichuan Jinying	2004	China League Two			-		-		-		-			
Happy Valley	2005–06	Hong Kong First Division League	7	0	0	0			-		3 (Note: Appearance in Hong Kong Senior Challenge Shield)	0	10	0
Happy Valley	2006–07	Hong Kong First Division League	10	0	0	0	0	0	-		1	0	11	0
Happy Valley	Total		17	0	0	0	0	0	0	0	4	0	21	0
Bulova Rangers	2007–08	Hong Kong First Division League	11	0	1	0	3	0	-		0	0	15	0
Fourway Rangers	2008–09	Hong Kong First Division League	20	0	3	0	2	0	-		0	0	25	0
Fourway Rangers	2009–10	Hong Kong First Division League	12	0	2	0	-		-		1	0	15	0
Fourway Rangers	Total		32	0	5	0	2	0	0	0	1	0	40	0
Fushun Xinye	2011	China League Two	15	0	-		-		-		-		15	0
Tianjin Songjiang	2012	China League One	25	0	0	0	-		-		-		25	0
Hebei Zhongji (Loan)	2013	China League Two	12	0	0	0	-		-		-		12	0
Chongqing Lifan	2014	China League One	28	0	0	0	-		-		-		28	0
Chongqing Lifan	2015	Chinese Super League	28	0	0	0	-		-		-		28	0
Chongqing Lifan	2016	Chinese Super League	0	0	1	0	-		-		-		1	0
Chongqing Lifan	2017	Chinese Super League	3	0	0	0	-		-		-		3	0
Chongqing Lifan	2018	Chinese Super League	17	0	0	0	-		-		-		17	0
Chongqing Lifan	2019	Chinese Super League	25	0	0	0	-		-		-		25	0
Chongqing Lifan	2020	Chinese Super League	8	0	1	0	-		-		-		9	0
Chongqing Lifan	Total		109	0	2	0	0	0	0	0	0	0	111	0
Shanxi Longjin	2021	China League Two	26	0	0	0	-		-		-		26	0
Shijiazhuang Gongfu	2022	China League One	29	0	0	0	-		-		-		29	0
Shijiazhuang Gongfu	2023	China League One	29	0	0	0	-		-		-		29	0
Shijiazhuang Gongfu	Total		58	0	0	0	0	0	0	0	0	0	58	0
Dalian Yingbo	2024	China League One	25	0	0	0	-		-		-		25	0
Dalian Yingbo	2025	Chinese Super League	9	0	0	0	-		-		-		9	0
Dalian Yingbo	Total		34	0	0	0	0	0	0	0	0	0	34	0
Career total			340	0	8	0	5	0	0	0	5	0	358	0

== Honours ==
=== Club ===
Harbin Lange

- China League Two: 2002

Happy Valley

- Hong Kong First Division League: 2005–06

Chongqing Lifan

- China League One: 2014
