= Yin Congyao =

Chinese footballer

Yin Congyao 尹聪耀
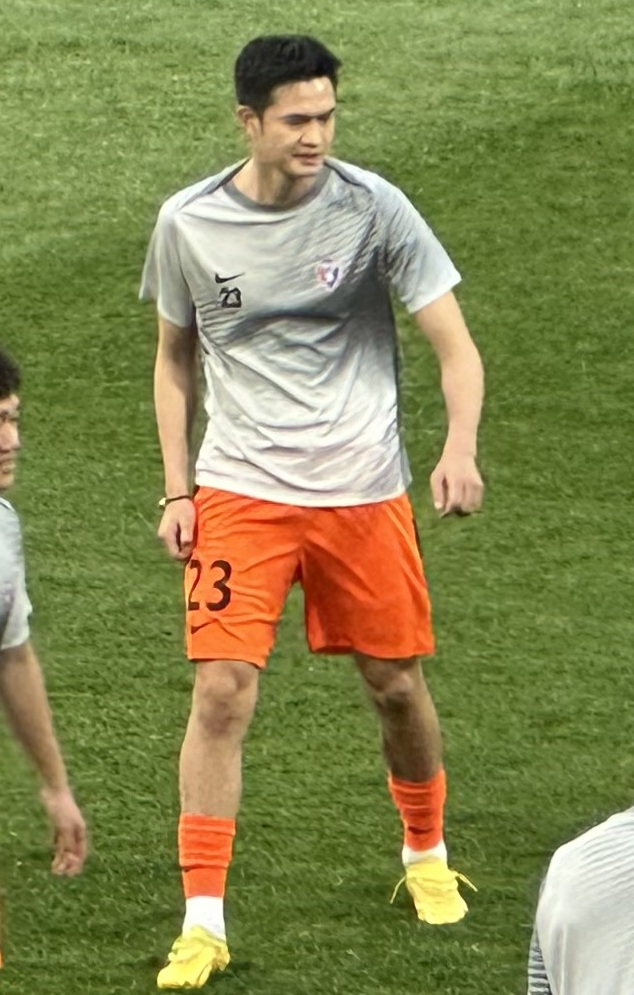
- Yin Congyao in May 2025

Personal information
- Date of birth: 4 March 1997 (age 29)
- Place of birth: Huangshi, Hubei, China
- Height: 1.82 m (5 ft 11 1/2 in)
- Position: Midfielder

Team information
- Current team: Henan FC
- Number: 24

Youth career
- 2007–2008: Wuhan Optics Valley
- 2008–2013: Tianjin TEDA
- 2015: AS Trenčín

Senior career*
Years	Team	Apps	(Gls)
2014–2015	Nanjing Qianbao	1	(0)
2015–2017	AS Trenčín	0	(0)
2015–2016	→ Slovan Nemšová (loan)	19	(0)
2017	Nei Mongol Zhongyou	6	(0)
2018–2021	Chongqing Dangdai	83	(4)
2022–2024	Meizhou Hakka	52	(3)
2025	Yunnan Yukun	11	(0)
2026–	Henan FC	14	(1)

International career^{‡}
2018	China U-23	3	(1)
- * Club domestic league appearances and goals as of 22 November 2026 ‡ National team caps and goals as of 18 February 2019

Yin Congyao (Chinese: 尹聪耀; pinyin: Yǐn Cōngyào; born 4 March 1997) is a Chinese footballer who plays for Henan FC.

== Club career ==
Yin joined Slovak First Football League club AS Trenčín in the summer of 2015. On 13 October 2015, he made his debut for the club in a 3–0 away win against fourth-tier club Jaslovské Bohunice in the 2015–16 Slovak Cup, coming on as a substitute for Denis Jančo in the half time. He mainly played for Trenčín's satellite team Nemšová of 3. Liga in the 2015–16 and 2016–17 season. Yin was released by the club in January 2017.

Yin returned to China and joined China League One side Nei Mongol Zhongyou. He registered to play in League One in July 2017. He made his debut for the club on 21 August 2017 in a 2–0 home win against Meizhou Hakka, coming on for Zhang Tianlong in the injury time.

On 10 January 2018, Yin transferred to Chinese Super League side Chongqing Dangdai Lifan. On 3 March 2018, he made his Super League debut in a 1–0 home win against Beijing Renhe, coming on as a substitute for Alan Kardec in the 88th minute. He would leave the team after the club was dissolved on 24 May 2022 after the majority owner, Wuhan Dangdai Group could not restructure the clubs shareholdings and debt.

He would join the newly promoted Meizhou Hakka and would go on to make his debut in a league game on 4 June 2022 against Tianjin Jinmen Tiger in a 1–1 draw.

On 21 January 2025, Yin joined Chinese Super League club Yunnan Yukun. On 1 January 2026, Yunnan Yukun announced Yin's departure after the 2025 season.

On 21 February 2026, Yin joined Chinese Super League club Henan FC.

== Career statistics ==
As of 31 December 2022.

Appearances and goals by club, season and competition
Club	Season	League			National Cup		Continental		Other		Total	
Club	Season	Division	Apps	Goals	Apps	Goals	Apps	Goals	Apps	Goals	Apps	Goals
Nanjing Qianbao	2014	China League Two	0	0	-		-		-		0	0
Nanjing Qianbao	2015	China League Two	1	0	0	0	-		-		1	0
Nanjing Qianbao	Total		1	0	0	0	0	0	0	0	1	0
AS Trenčín	2015–16	Slovak First Football League	0	0	1	0	-		-		1	0
AS Trenčín	2016–17	Slovak First Football League	0	0	1	0	0	0	-		1	0
AS Trenčín	Total		0	0	2	0	0	0	0	0	2	0
Nemšová (loan)	2015–16	3. Liga	8	0	0	0	-		-		8	0
Nemšová (loan)	2016–17	3. Liga	11	0	0	0	-		-		11	0
Nemšová (loan)	Total		19	0	0	0	0	0	0	0	19	0
Nei Mongol Zhongyou	2017	China League One	6	0	0	0	-		-		6	0
Chongqing Dangdai	2018	Chinese Super League	21	0	2	0	-		-		23	0
Chongqing Dangdai	2019	Chinese Super League	27	1	2	0	-		-		29	1
Chongqing Dangdai	2020	Chinese Super League	15	0	1	0	-		-		16	0
Chongqing Dangdai	2021	Chinese Super League	20	3	2	1	-		-		22	4
Chongqing Dangdai	Total		83	4	7	1	0	0	0	0	90	15
Meizhou Hakka	2022	Chinese Super League	15	0	2	0	-		-		17	0
Career total			124	4	11	1	0	0	0	0	135	5
