= Dalian K'un City F.C. =

Association football club in China

Dalian K'un City
- Full name: Dalian K'un City Football Club 大连鲲城足球俱乐部
- Founded: 9 May 2022; 4 years ago
- Ground: Jinzhou Stadium
- Capacity: 30,776
- Chairman: Li Jundou
- Manager: Yang Lin
- League: China League One
- 2025: China League One, 8th of 16
| Home colours | Away colours |

Dalian K'un City Football Club (Chinese: 大连鲲城足球俱乐部; pinyin: Dàlián Kūnchéng Zúqiú Jùlèbù) is a Chinese professional football club based in Dalian, Liaoning, that competes in China League One, the second tier of Chinese football. Dalian K'un City plays its home matches at the Jinzhou Stadium, located within Jinzhou District.

== History ==
Founded as Liaoning Pilot Free Trade Zone Dalian Area Huayi Football Club (Chinese: 辽宁自贸试验区大连片区华谊足球俱乐部) on 9 May 2022, Dalian Huayi entered the 2022 Chinese Champions League (CMCL) as the winner of the CMCL berth from the qualification route in Dalian. They were drawn into a group with Changchun Shenhua and Liaoning Leading, a group which Dalian Huayi finished second in, thus qualifying for the knock-outs, where Dalian Huayi faced Dalian Jinshiwan. A 0–0 draw in the first leg and a 1–0 loss in the second leg meant that Dalian Huayi were knocked out of the competition, and the match separated by a Sui Donglu goal marked Dalian Huayi's end for the 2022 season.

The club enrolled in the CMCL for the 2023 season again, this time being drawn into group H. After topping their group and winning twice more, Dalian Huayi advanced into the final round, being drawn into group B. Picking up four wins, two draws, and one loss, Dalian Huayi finished third of eight in their group, setting up a knock-out tie with Rizhao Yuqi. Tied at 1–1 in normal time, Dalian Huayi were defeated 3–2 on penalties, eventually finishing the season in seventh overall, missing out on promotion. However, on 6 February 2024, Dalian Huayi were admitted into China League Two, as sufficient teams above them in the Chinese football pyramid have either pulled out or dissolved. In accordance with the Chinese FA's name neutralisation policy, Dalian Huayi changed their name to be Dalian K'un City Football Club on the same day.

On the opening day of the 2024 China League Two season on 23 March 2024, Dalian travelled to Langfang Glory City, with the match finishing 1–0 for Dalian K'un City. The goal from Liu Zhizhi secured Dalian K'un City's first ever win in China League Two, the highest level the club has played in thus far. Dalian K'un City secure promotion to China League One for the first time in their history from next season.

== Players ==
=== Current squad ===
As of July 2026

Note: Flags indicate national team as defined under FIFA eligibility rules; some limited exceptions apply. Players may hold more than one non-FIFA nationality.

| No. | Pos. | Nation | Player |
|---|---|---|---|
| 1 | GK | CHN | Chen Peng |
| 2 | DF | CHN | Wang Wenxuan |
| 3 | DF | CHN | Lu Kun |
| 4 | DF | CHN | Liu Shiming |
| 5 | DF | CHN | Lin Longchang |
| 6 | DF | CHN | Ji Zhengyu |
| 7 | FW | CHN | Feng Zeyuan |
| 8 | MF | TPE | Wu Yen-shu |
| 9 | FW | CHN | Yan Peng |
| 10 | FW | NOR | Kristoffer Normann Hansen |
| 11 | FW | BFA | Cyrille Bayala |
| 13 | DF | CHN | Wang Yaopeng |
| 14 | MF | CHN | Long Tingwei |
| 16 | FW | CHN | Hu Zhengjun |
| 17 | GK | CHN | Sui Weijie |
| 18 | DF | CHN | Xu Dongdong |

| No. | Pos. | Nation | Player |
|---|---|---|---|
| 20 | MF | CHN | Xu Jianpeng |
| 21 | MF | CHN | You Sihan |
| 22 | MF | CHN | Liu Yun |
| 24 | MF | CHN | Zhang Shihao |
| 25 | MF | CHN | Yan Yihan (on loan from Dalian Yingbo) |
| 26 | MF | CHN | Cui Ming'an |
| 27 | MF | CHN | Zhang Hongjiang |
| 29 | DF | CHN | Zheng Weijie |
| 30 | FW | ZIM | Nyasha Mushekwi |
| 33 | GK | CHN | Ma Kunyue |
| 37 | DF | CHN | Zhao Jianan |
| 39 | FW | CHN | Lei Wenjie |
| 40 | DF | CHN | Elkut Eysajan (on loan from Shaanxi Union) |
| 42 | MF | CHN | Ma Yujun (on loan from Chongqing Tonglianglong) |

=== Out on loan ===
Note: Flags indicate national team as defined under FIFA eligibility rules; some limited exceptions apply. Players may hold more than one non-FIFA nationality.

| No. / Pos. / Nation / Player; - / FW / CHN / Ouyang Chengzhuo (at Wenzhou FC until 31 December 2026) | No. / Pos. / Nation / Player; - / MF / CHN / Zhao Jianbo (at Guizhou Guiyang Athletic until 31 December 2026) |

== Managerial staff ==
As of Jan 2026

| Position | Staff |
|---|---|
| Head coach | (China) Yang Lin |
| Assistant coaches | (China) Chang Lin |
| Assistant coaches | (China) Liu Zhiqing |
| Assistant coaches | (China) Chi Yaojun |
| Fitness coaches | (China) Zhu Ting |
| Goalkeeping Coach | (China) Qi Xiaoguang |
| Team Manager | (China) Li Wenbo |
