= Chongqing Olympic Sports Center =

Sports venue in Chongqing, China

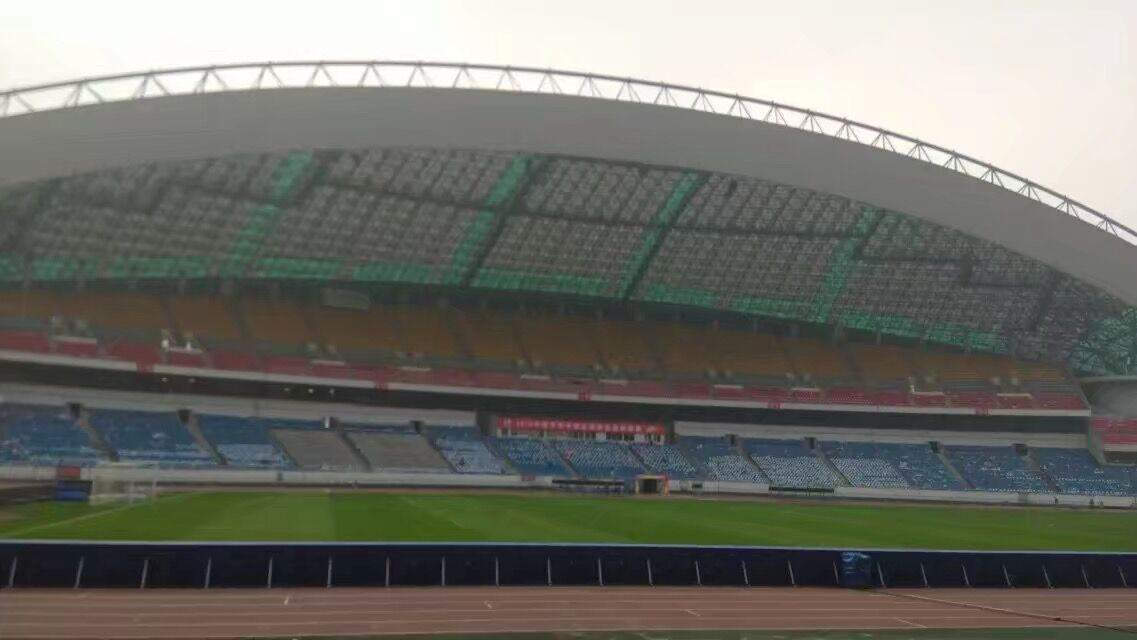
- Interactive map of Chongqing Olympic Sports Center
- Location: Chongqing, China
- Coordinates: 29°31′43.3″N 106°30′07.6″E
- Owner: Municipality of Chongqing
- Operator: Chongqing Sports Bureau
- Capacity: 58,680

Construction
- Opened: 2004

Tenant
- Chongqing SWM

The Chongqing Olympic Sports Center (simplified Chinese: 重庆奥林匹克体育中心; traditional Chinese: 重慶奧林匹克體育中心) is a sports venue featuring a 58,680-seat multipurpose stadium named Chongqing Olympic Sports Center Stadium in Chongqing, China.

The sports center is the home stadium of Chongqing Lifan F.C. of Chinese Football Association Super League. It was built in 2004.

The stadium is also a popular venue for concerts. Mariah Carey began her The Elusive Chanteuse Show tour in China at the stadium on October 15, 2014.

== Transport ==
It is served by Olympic Sports Center station on the Loop line of Chongqing Rail Transit.
