= 2010 China League Two =

China League Two
- Season: 2010
- Champions: Dalian Aerbin
- Promoted: Dalian Aerbin; Tianjin Songjiang
- Top goalscorer: (China) Guo Hui (11 goals, Dalian Aerbin)

The 2010 China League Two season is the 21st season since its establishment. League kicked off on 9 May 2010.

== Group Stage Standings ==
=== North Group ===
Pos	Team	Pld	W	D	L	GF	GA	GD	Pts	Qualification
1	Dalian Aerbin (Q, C, P)	16	11	1	4	29	11	+18	34	Play-off semi-finals
2	Dalian Yiteng (Q)	16	8	3	5	23	17	+6	27	Play-off first round
3	Tianjin Huochetou (Q)	16	6	2	8	15	17	−2	20	Play-off first round
4	Liaoning Tiger	16	4	6	6	12	23	−11	18	
5	Panjin Mengzun	16	4	2	10	14	25	−11	14	

- Round 1: Dalian Yiteng 2-2 Liaoning Tiger, Panjin Mengzun 0-1 Dalian Aerbin (9 May)
- Round 2: Tianjin Huochetou 2-0 Panjin Mengzun, Liaoning Tiger 0-1 Dalian Aerbin (15 May)
- Round 3: Dalian Aerbin 4-1 Dalian Yiteng, Liaoning Tiger 0-1 Tianjin Huochetou (22 May)
- Round 4: Dalian Yiteng 0-0 Tianjin Huochetou, Panjin Mengzun 0-0 Liaoning Tiger (29 May)
- Round 5: Dalian Yiteng 2-1 Panjin Mengzun, Tianjin Huochetou 0-1 Dalian Aerbin (5 June)
- Round 6: Dalian Aerbin 2-0 Panjin Mengzun, Liaoning Tiger 0-0 Dalian Yiteng (17 July)
- Round 7: Dalian Aerbin 0-0 Liaoning Tiger, Tianjin Huochetou 0-1 Panjin Mengzun (24 July)
- Round 8: Dalian Yiteng 3-0 Dalian Aerbin, Tianjin Huochetou 1-1 Liaoning Tiger (31 July)
- Round 9: Tianjin Huochetou 1-0 Dalian Yiteng, Liaoning Tiger 2-1 Panjin Mengzun (7 August)
- Round 10: Dalian Aerbin 4-1 Tianjin Huochetou, Panjin Mengzun 0-1 Dalian Yiteng (14 August)
- Round 11: Dalian Yiteng 2-1 Liaoning Tiger, Panjin Mengzun 0-4 Dalian Aerbin (21 August)
- Round 12: Panjin Mengzun 2-1 Tianjin Huochetou, Liaoning Tiger 2-1 Dalian Aerbin (28 August)
- Round 13: Dalian Aerbin 3-1 Dalian Yiteng, Liaoning Tiger 2-1 Tianjin Huochetou (4 September)
- Round 14: Dalian Yiteng 1-2 Tianjin Huochetou, Panjin Mengzun 1-1 Liaoning Tiger (11 September)
- Round 15: Dalian Yiteng 2-1 Panjin Mengzun, Tianjin Huochetou 1-0 Dalian Aerbin (18 September)
- Round 16: Liaoning Tiger 0-5 Dalian Yiteng (25 September), Dalian Aerbin 2-1 Panjin Mengzun (26 September)
- Round 17: Dalian Aerbin 3-0 Liaoning Tiger, Tianjin Huochetou 4-0 Panjin Mengzun (2 October)
- Round 18: Dalian Yiteng 1-0 Dalian Aerbin, Tianjin Huochetou 0-1 Liaoning Tiger (9 October)
- Round 19: Tianjin Huochetou 0-1 Dalian Yiteng, Liaoning Tiger 0-4 Panjin Mengzun (16 October)
- Round 20: Dalian Aerbin 3-0 Tianjin Huochetou, Panjin Mengzun 2-1 Dalian Yiteng (23 October)

=== South Group ===
Pos	Team	Pld	W	D	L	GF	GA	GD	Pts	Qualification
1	Tianjin Songjiang (Q, C, P)	16	10	5	1	30	9	+21	35	Play-off semi-finals
2	Guizhou Zhicheng (Q)	16	4	9	3	16	12	+4	21	Play-off first round
3	Hubei CTGU Kangtian (Q)	16	3	9	4	13	17	−4	18	Play-off first round
4	Sichuan F.C.	16	3	8	5	12	17	−5	17	
5	Wenzhou Provenza	16	1	7	8	13	29	−16	10	

- Round 1: Wenzhou Provenza 2-2 Guizhou Zhicheng, Hubei CTGU Kangtian 0-2 Tianjin Songjiang (9 May)
- Round 2: Wenzhou Provenza 1-1 Tianjin Songjiang, Sichuan F.C. 2-1 Hubei CTGU Kangtian (15 May)
- Round 3: Tianjin Songjiang 1-1 Guizhou Zhicheng, Wenzhou Provenza 0-1 Sichuan F.C. (22 May)
- Round 4: Hubei CTGU Kangtian 1-2 Wenzhou Provenza, Guizhou Zhicheng 1-1 Sichuan F.C. (29 May)
- Round 5: Guizhou Zhicheng 0-0 Hubei CTGU Kangtian, Sichuan F.C. 0-2 Tianjin Songjiang (5 June)
- Round 6: Tianjin Songjiang 3-0 Hubei CTGU Kangtian, Guizhou Zhicheng 3-1 Wenzhou Provenza (17 July)
- Round 7: Tianjin Songjiang 3-0 Wenzhou Provenza, Hubei CTGU Kangtian 1-1 Sichuan F.C. (24 July)
- Round 8: Guizhou Zhicheng 0-1 Tianjin Songjiang, Sichuan F.C. 0-0 Wenzhou Provenza (31 July)
- Round 9: Wenzhou Provenza 2-2 Hubei CTGU Kangtian, Sichuan F.C. 1-1 Guizhou Zhicheng (7 August)
- Round 10: Tianjin Songjiang 4-1 Sichuan F.C. (14 August), Hubei CTGU Kangtian 2-1 Guizhou Zhicheng (16 August)
- Round 11: Wenzhou Provenza 0-2 Guizhou Zhicheng, Hubei CTGU Kangtian 1-0 Tianjin Songjiang (21 August)
- Round 12: Wenzhou Provenza 0-5 Tianjin Songjiang, Sichuan F.C. 0-0 Hubei CTGU Kangtian (28 August)
- Round 13: Tianjin Songjiang 0-0 Guizhou Zhicheng, Wenzhou Provenza 2-2 Sichuan F.C. (4 September)
- Round 14: Hubei CTGU Kangtian 2-1 Wenzhou Provenza, Guizhou Zhicheng 0-1 Sichuan F.C. (12 September)
- Round 15: Guizhou Zhicheng 0-0 Hubei CTGU Kangtian, Sichuan F.C. 0-1 Tianjin Songjiang (18 September)
- Round 16: Tianjin Songjiang 2-2 Hubei CTGU Kangtian, Guizhou Zhicheng 2-0 Wenzhou Provenza (25 September)
- Round 17: Tianjin Songjiang 2-1 Wenzhou Provenza, Hubei CTGU Kangtian 0-0 Sichuan F.C. (2 October)
- Round 18: Guizhou Zhicheng 1-1 Tianjin Songjiang, Sichuan F.C. 1-1 Wenzhou Provenza (9 October)
- Round 19: Wenzhou Provenza 0-0 Hubei CTGU Kangtian, Sichuan F.C. 0-1 Guizhou Zhicheng (16 October)
- Round 20: Tianjin Songjiang 2-1 Sichuan F.C., Hubei CTGU Kangtian 1-1 Guizhou Zhicheng (23 October)

== Play-offs ==
- Play-off finalists promotes to China League One.

=== First round ===
Team 1	Agg.	Team 2	1st leg	2nd leg
Dalian Yiteng	3–2	Hubei CTGU Kangtian	3–2	0–0
Guizhou Zhicheng	3–0	Tianjin Huochetou	1–0	2–0

==== First leg ====
21 November 2010

Dalian Yiteng	3 – 2	Hubei CTGU Kangtian
Han Jiabao 15'; Shao Shuai 57'; Niu Xilong 80'		Yan Qi 83'; Liu Zhiming 87'

Olympic Sports Center, Chongqing

21 November 2010

Guizhou Zhicheng	1 – 0	Tianjin Huochetou
Lin Longchang 80'

Olympic Sports Center, Chongqing

==== Second leg ====
23 November 2010

Hubei CTGU Kangtian	0 – 0	Dalian Yiteng

Olympic Sports Center, Chongqing

23 November 2010

Tianjin Huochetou	0 – 2	Guizhou Zhicheng
		Fan Yunlong 4', 86'

Olympic Sports Center, Chongqing

=== Semi-finals / Promotion finals ===
Team 1	Agg.	Team 2	1st leg	2nd leg
Dalian Aerbin (P)	3–1	Guizhou Zhicheng	3–1	0–0
Tianjin Songjiang (P)	2–1	Dalian Yiteng	0–0	2–1

==== First leg ====
27 November 2010

Dalian Aerbin	3 – 1	Guizhou Zhicheng
Yin Lu 68'; Zhou Tong 72'; Guo Hui 83'		Du Shaobin 22'

Olympic Sports Center, Chongqing

27 November 2010

Tianjin Songjiang	0 – 0	Dalian Yiteng

Olympic Sports Center, Chongqing

==== Second leg ====
29 November 2010

Guizhou Zhicheng	0 – 0	Dalian Aerbin

Olympic Sports Center, Chongqing

29 November 2010

Dalian Yiteng	1 – 2 (a.e.t.)	Tianjin Songjiang
Han Jiabao 95'		Xu Bo 115'; Wu Lei 120+2'

Olympic Sports Center, Chongqing

=== Third-place match ===
1 December 2010

Dalian Yiteng	1 – 1	Guizhou Zhicheng
Han Xu 32'		Wang Lichun 73'
Penalties
Han Xu (penalty scored); Han Jiabao (penalty missed); Liu Xiaolong (penalty scored); Li Xiaoting (penalty scored); Sun Shilin (penalty scored); Han Deming (penalty missed)	4 – 5	Wang Lichun (penalty missed); Tang Yan (penalty scored); Feng Kai (penalty scored); Li Kai (penalty scored); Fan Yunlong (penalty scored); Zou Di (penalty scored)

Olympic Sports Center, Chongqing

=== Champions final ===
1 December 2010

Dalian Aerbin	2 – 0	Tianjin Songjiang
Guo Hui 12'; Hou Zhe 66'

Olympic Sports Center, Chongqing
