= Dalian Professional F.C. =

Chinese association football club

Dalian Professional Dàlián Rén 大连人
- Full name: Dalian Professional Football Club 大连人职业足球俱乐部
- Nickname: Blue Hawks
- Founded: 20 September 2009; 17 years ago
- Dissolved: 17 January 2024; 2 years ago
- Ground: Dalian Suoyuwan Football Stadium
- Capacity: 63,000
- 2023: Chinese Super League, 15th of 16 (relegated)
- Website: www.dlpro.com.cn
Home colours	Away colours

Dalian Professional Football Club (Chinese: 大连人职业足球俱乐部; pinyin: Dàlián Rén Zhíyè Zúqiú Jùlèbù; lit. 'The Dalianese F.C.'), known as Dalian Pro, was a Chinese professional football club based in Dalian, Liaoning, which mostly competed in the Chinese Super League. Dalian Pro played its home matches at various grounds across Dalian, including the Dalian Sports Centre Stadium, the Dalian Suoyuwan Football Stadium, the Jinzhou Stadium, and the Puwan Stadium.

The club was refounded on September 20, 2009, by Dalian Aerbin Group Company, Ltd., and started from the third tier of the Chinese football pyramid, China League Two. Winning two consecutive league titles in the second and third tier professional football leagues, they were promoted to the top tier in the 2012 Chinese Super League season, where they experienced their highest ever placing of fifth in the same season. In 2014, they were relegated from the Chinese Super League. In December 2015, they were renamed Dalian Yifang Football Club. In October 2017, they were crowned champions of China League One and once again secured promotion to the Chinese Super League. On May 25, 2019, Dalian Yifang Football Club was renamed Dalian Professional Football Club, with the new logo unveiled on January 21, 2020. The team dissolved on 17 January 2024 due to unaffordable historical debts.

== History ==
=== Dalian Aerbin (2009–2014) ===
On September 20, 2009, Dalian Aerbin Group Co. Ltd. established a new professional football club named Dalian Aerbin (Chinese: 大连阿尔滨) and hired former Chinese footballer Li Ming to become the club manager. The club's name Aerbin comes from the Manchu language, meaning a place with water, which is also the name of a small town in Jinzhou District of Dalian where Dalian Aerbin Group Co. Ltd is located. They would soon move into the Dalian University Stadium in the Dalian Development Area and bring in Chi Shangbin as their co-manager and Sun Xianlu as their head coach. Starting in the third-tier league, the club made their debut in the 2010 China League Two season. The club brought in established top-tier Chinese Super League players such as Guo Hui, Chang Lin, and Yang Lin. The quality of these players helped the club win their regional division section and later, the league title over Tianjin Songjiang as the club won the championship.

In the following season, the club hired its first foreign coach, Bulgarian manager Aleksandar Stankov. Dalian Aerbin F.C. set up a surprising winning streak and won the 2011 China League One championship. With their meteoric rise to the Super League, the club decided to use the 30,775-seater Jinzhou Stadium as its home stadium and shared it with their local rival Dalian Shide, as well as signing a more experienced manager in Chang Woe-Ryong, who had previously managed in the Chinese Super League with Qingdao Jonoon. The club initially struggled in the league and the club brought in Aleksandar Stanojević as the head coach. By July 11, 2012, Dalian Aerbin brought in a marquee player in the form of former Barcelona F.C. midfielder Seydou Keita, who departed the Spanish team on a free transfer and helped ensure Dalian Aerbin remained within the league. At the end of the 2012 league season, Stanojevć managed to not only avoid relegation but actually guided the club to fifth within the league.

On 30 November 2012, Aerbin Group acquired the local rival Dalian Shide F.C. by taking on responsibility of their 330 million RMB debt after Dalian Shide's chairman Xu Ming was arrested for bribing and corruption. In the hope of bringing in a harmonious merger of the two teams, former Dalian Shide manager Xu Hong was brought in for the start of the 2013 Chinese Super League. However, after only 63 days in charge, he had to resign after the Chinese Football Association found that he had manipulated a match while he was a manager at Sichuan First City and was given a 5-year suspension from all football activity, which forced Li Ming to start the season as their caretaker manager. The Chinese Football Association called off this merger, according to regulations, and decided that former Dalian Shide players should join the free market, while Dalian Aerbin could only sign them through a normal transfer, 5 at most, instead of taking over the whole team. This incident caused Aerbin to face some serious financial problems, being unable to pay the salaries, bonuses, or even maintenance of the stadium. At the end of the 2014 Chinese Super League, Aerbin was relegated to China League One.

=== Dalian Yifang (2015–2019) ===
With Dalian Aerbin back in the China League One division and with the loss of revenue generated from being in the top tier, the club could not afford to maintain their squad, which saw a mass exodus of players. Mikael Stahre was hired as the head coach at the start of the 2015 league campaign and looked to be pushing for promotion, which saw Dalian Yifang Group Co. Ltd on 8 July 2015, buy majority shares within the club. The purchase was promoted by Wang Jianlin and his Dalian Wanda Group, who are a main shareholder of the Yifang Group (一方, "one region"), with the investment signaling a return of football ownership from Wang Jianlin, who had previously owned Dalian Wanda F.C. The club failed to win promotion back into the top tier after finishing third place at the end of the 2015 season and officially changed their name to Dalian Yifang F.C. (Chinese: 大连一方) in December 2015. On 10 July 2015, in a press conference to confirm the Yifang Group's investment, the general manager, Shi Xueqing (石雪清), admitted that the club was still losing money.

In the 2017 China League One season, Dalian Yifang won the division title and promotion back into the top tier under head coach Juan Ramón López Caro. Despite this success, the Dalian Football Association announced that he was being replaced by Ma Lin, which saw speculation grow that the club was still in financial difficulties and was looking for the local government Dalian Sports Bureau to take over the club. On 20 February 2018, the Wanda Group took full control on the club after selling their 17% share in Atlético Madrid to Israeli businessman Idan Ofer on 14 February 2018. The Wanda Group would use the money taken from Atlético Madrid and invest it in bringing in Argentinian international Nicolás Gaitán and Belgium international Yannick Carrasco.

The team and the Wanda Group sought further influence in the 2019 season. In February 2019, the club completed another marquee signing from Europe, this time acquiring the services of Napoli man Marek Hamšík, who signed for a reported fee of about €20 million (£18m/$23m). Gaitán left the team to play for the MLS side Chicago Fire after just one season. The team signed with Korean manager Choi Kang-hee, but had less-than-expected performance as the league went halfways. In July 2019, Dalian Pro ended contract with Choi, while Rafael Benítez was introduced to the team, that he "was impressed by chairman Wang's passion and future plan on football". Salomon Rondon also joined from Newcastle United, as a response to Benítez's call.

=== Dalian Pro (2020–2024) ===
On 21 January 2020, Dalian Yifang changed their name to Dalian Pro. Due to the COVID-19 pandemic, the 2020 Chinese Super League did not start until July, after which, Carrasco decided to leave the team. Dalian Pro and Benitez focused on aggressive promotion of young players, putting older players down to the reserves, as the 2020 league did not have much relegation pressure.

In January 2021, Benítez and Dalian Pro parted ways. Hamsik and Rondon also decided to leave. As the CSL introduced further limits on salary cap and transfer fees, the team seemed to reach a post-marquee era by not introducing new foreign players and remained low-profile. The team appointed José González, but was relegated to China League One after the season.

On 12 March 2022, Dalian Pro announced major changes in its owners. Wanda Group decided to quit, and the team would be taken over temporarily by a government-led reforming work team. Past debts and operating costs of the first team, youth training facilities, and projects for the next three years would still be covered by Wanda Group. The Dalian Pro Academy Base was donated to DETA Holdings (德泰控股), a state-invested company in Dalian.

On 27 May 2022, the Chinese Football Association (CFA) announced that Dalian Pro, which had been relegated from the top flight at the end of last season, would compete in the 18-team top flight, as a replacement for disbanded club Chongqing Liangjiang Athletic.

Dalian Pro were relegated from the Chinese Super League once again in 2023, and failed to acquire the entry permission into the 2024 league due to historical debts. The team announced its cease of operations on 17 January 2024.

=== Ownership and naming history ===
Year	Owner	Club name
2009–15	Dalian Aerbin Group	Dalian Aerbin Football Club
2015	Dalian Yifang Group	Dalian Aerbin Football Club
2016–2020	Dalian Yifang Group	Dalian Yifang Football Club
2020–2021	Dalian Wanda Group	Dalian Professional Football Club
2022–2024	Football Reform Workgroup of Dalian (Government-based)	Dalian Professional Football Club

== Last coaching staff ==
As of 16 May 2022

First team
Head coach	(China) Xie Hui
Assistant coach	(Hong Kong) Ng Wai Chiu
Assistant coach	(China) Chang Lin
Goalkeeping coach	(Brazil) Everton da Rocha Santos
Fitness coach	(Spain) Alex Ros Cladella
Tactical Analyst	(Spain) Aitor Calero Garcia
Reserve and youth teams
Reserve (U-23) coach	(Spain) David Rivas Martínez
U-21 coach	(China) Liu Yujian
U-21 assistant coach	(China) Zhou Ting
U-19 coach	(China) Sun Wei
U-17 coach	(China) Zhang Yaokun
U-17 assistant coach	(China) Zou Peng
U-17 assistant coach	(China) Li Wenbo
U-15 coach	(China) Zhao Peng
U-15 assistant coach	(China) Chi Yaojun
U-14 coach	(China) Li Yang
U-15 assistant coach	(China) Zou Jie
U-13 coach	(China) Wang Zhaochen

=== Managerial history ===
As of 16 April 2021

Managers	Period
(China) Chi Shangbin	Jan 1, 2009 – Dec 31, 2010
(China) Sun Xianlu	2010
(Bulgaria) Aleksandar Stankov	June 2010 – Dec 11, 2011
(South Korea) Chang Woe-ryong	Jan 1, 2012 – Apr 3, 2012
(Serbia) Aleksandar Stanojević	Apr 4, 2012 – Nov 9, 2012
(China) Xu Hong	Dec 11, 2012 – Feb 18, 2013
(China) Li Ming (interim)	Feb 18, 2013 – June 5, 2013
(Bosnia and Herzegovina) Simo Krunić	June 3, 2013 – Dec 5, 2013
(China) Ma Lin	Nov 5, 2013 – May 28, 2014
(Japan) Yasuharu Kurata	May 30, 2014 – Dec 19, 2014
(Sweden) Mikael Stahre	Jan 5, 2015 – July 5, 2016
(Serbia) Milinko Pantić	July 5, 2016 – Aug 31, 2016
(Spain) Sergio Piernas	Aug 31, 2016 – Nov 29, 2016
(Spain) Juan Ramón López Caro	Nov 29, 2016 – Dec 26, 2017
(China) Ma Lin	Dec 26, 2017 – Mar 20, 2018
(Germany) Bernd Schuster	Mar 20, 2018 – Feb 11, 2019
(South Korea) Choi Kang-hee	Feb 11, 2019 – July 1, 2019
(Spain) Rafael Benítez	July 1, 2019 – Jan 23, 2021
(Spain) José González	Apr 16, 2021 – Dec 31, 2021
(China) Xie Hui	Mar 19, 2022 – Dec 31, 2023

== Honours ==
- China League One (tier-II)
  - Winners (2): 2011, 2017
- China League Two (tier-III)
  - Winners (1): 2010

== Results ==
All-time League Rankings

As of the end of the 2023 season

Year	Div	Pld	W	D	L	GF	GA	GD	Pts	Pos.	FA Cup	Super Cup	AFC	Att./G	Stadium
2010	3	21	14	3	4	37	14	23	34^{1}	W	NH	NH	DNQ		Dalian University Stadium
2011	2	26	16	6	4	45	20	25	54	W	R2	NH	DNQ		Dalian University Stadium
2012	1	30	11	11	8	51	46	5	44	5	QF	DNQ	DNQ	15,774	Jinzhou Stadium
2013	1	30	11	8	11	40	43	−3	41	5	SF	DNQ	DNQ	10,538	Jinzhou Stadium
2014	1	30	6	11	13	32	45	−13	29	15	R3	DNQ	DNQ	10,993	Dalian Sports Centre Stadium
2015	2	30	17	7	6	46	22	24	58	3	R3	DNQ	DNQ	15,233	Dalian Sports Centre Stadium
2016	2	30	14	3	13	43	44	−1	45	5	R3	DNQ	DNQ	10,806	Dalian Sports Centre Stadium
2017	2	30	19	7	4	48	23	25	64	W	R3	DNQ	DNQ	20,596	Dalian Sports Centre Stadium
2018	1	30	10	5	15	37	57	−20	35	11	SF	DNQ	DNQ	33,145	Dalian Sports Centre Stadium
2019	1	30	10	8	12	44	51	−7	38	9	SF	DNQ	DNQ	32,853	Dalian Sports Centre Stadium
2020	1	14	2	5	7	18	21	−3	11^{2}	12	R1	DNQ	DNQ	−^{3}	−^{3}
2021	1	22	6	1	15	21	37	−16	19	15	QF	DNQ	DNQ	−^{4}	−^{4}
2022	1	34	12	9	13	49	53	-4	45	11	R2	DNQ	DNQ		Puwan Stadium; Dalian Sports Centre Stadium
2023	1	30	3	11	16	25	47	-22	20	15	SF	DNQ	DNQ	18,031	Dalian Sports Centre Stadium; Dalian Barracuda Bay Football Stadium

- ^1 in group stage
- ^2 in group stage.
- ^3 the 2020 Chinese Super League was held behind closed doors most of the time; attendance and stadium not applicable.
- ^4 the 2021 Chinese Super League was held behind closed doors most of the time; attendance and stadium not applicable.

Key

	China top division
	China second division
	China third division
W	Winners
RU	Runners-up
3	Third place
	Relegated

- Pld = Played
- W = Games won
- D = Games drawn
- L = Games lost
- F = Goals for
- A = Goals against
- Pts = Points
- Pos = Final position
- DNQ = Did not qualify
- DNE = Did not enter
- NH = Not Held
- - = Does Not Exist
- R1 = Round 1
- R2 = Round 2
- R3 = Round 3
- R4 = Round 4
- F = Final
- SF = Semi-finals
- QF = Quarter-finals
- R16 = Round of 16
- Group = Group stage
- GS2 = Second Group stage
- QR1 = First Qualifying Round
- QR2 = Second Qualifying Round
- QR3 = Third Qualifying Round

== Past and present internationals ==
Had international caps for their respective countries.

China

- (China) Chen Lei (2012–2013)
- (China) Chen Tao (2013–2015)
- (China) Dong Xuesheng (2012–2013)
- (China) He Yupeng (2019–2023)
- (China) Hu Zhaojun (2011–2012)
- (China) Huang Jiahui (2019–2023)
- (China) Li Xuepeng (2013–2014)
- (China) Lin Liangming (2020–2023)
- (China) Liu Yu (2012–2013)
- (China) Lü Peng (2013–2014, 2022–2023)
- (China) Li Shuai (2016–2021)
- (China) Qin Sheng (2018–2019)
- (China) Sun Guowen (2017–2022)
- (China) Tong Lei (2020–2022)
- (China) Wang Jinxian (2014–2021)
- (China) Wang Wanpeng (2015–2018)
- (China) Yang Lin (2010–2012)
- (China) Yang Shanping (2018–2019)
- (China) Yan Xiangchuang (2022–2023)
- (China) Yu Dabao (2012–2014)
- (China) Yu Hanchao (2013–2014)
- (China) Zhang Jiaqi (2014)
- (China) Zhao Mingjian (2019)
- (China) Zhao Xuri (2019–2021)
- (China) Zheng Long (2019–2021)
- (China) Zhou Ting (2017–2020)
- (China) Zhu Ting (2015–2020, 2022–2023)

Africa

- (Guinea-Bissau) Almami Moreira (2011)
- (Ghana) Lee Addy (2012)
- (Mali) Seydou Keita (2012–2013)
- (Nigeria) Peter Utaka (2012–2013)
- (Morocco) Nabil Baha (2013)
- (Sierra Leone) Mohamed Bangura (2016)
- (Zimbabwe) Nyasha Mushekwi (2016–2019)
- (Liberia) Sekou Oliseh (2016)
- (Ghana) Emmanuel Boateng (2019–2021)
- (Central African Republic) Lobi Manzoki (2022–2023)

Asia

- (Australia) Daniel Mullen (2012–2013)
- (Australia) Mile Sterjovski (2012)
- (Iraq) Nashat Akram (2014)
- (Hong Kong) Alex Akande (2019–2020)
- (Hong Kong) Vas Nuñez (2022–2023)

Europe

- (Bulgaria) Kiril Kotev (2011)
- (France) Guillaume Hoarau (2013)
- (Croatia) Leon Benko (2014)
- (Sweden) Niklas Backman (2014–2015)
- (Romania) Constantin Budescu (2016)
- (Sweden) Mathias Ranégie (2016)
- (Portugal) José Fonte (2018)
- (Belgium) Yannick Carrasco (2018–2019)
- (Slovakia) Marek Hamšík (2019–2020)
- (Sweden) Sam Larsson (2020–2021)
- (Sweden) Marcus Danielson (2020–2021)
- (Bulgaria) Borislav Tsonev (2022–2023)

South America

- (Brazil) Fábio Rochemback (2012–2013)
- (Chile) Gustavo Canales (2012)
- (Argentina) Nicolás Gaitán (2018–2019)
- (Venezuela) Salomón Rondón (2019–2020)
