= 2023 Beijing Guoan F.C. season =

Beijing Guoan F.C.'s 59th season in football competition

Beijing Guoan
2023 season
- CEO: Zhou Jinhui
- General Manager: Li Ming
- Manager: Stanley Menzo (until 11 June); Ricardo Soares (from 15 June)
- Stadium: Workers' Stadium
- Super League: 6th
- FA Cup: Quarter Final
- Top goalscorer: League: Fábio Abreu (10); All: Fábio Abreu (12)
- Highest home attendance: 52,500 vs Shanghai Shenhua (19 August 2023); Super League
- Lowest home attendance: 32,239 vs Nantong Zhiyun (15 May 2023); Super League
- Average home league attendance: 43,769
- Biggest win: 5–0 vs Shenzhen (H) (8 July 2023); Super League
- Biggest defeat: 0–3 vs Shandong Taishan (A) (30 July 2023); Super League
Home colours	Away colours

The 2023 season was Beijing Guoan F.C.'s 59th season in Chinese football competitions. This season marked the club's 20th consecutive season in the Chinese Super League since the league's foundation in 2004, and it was the club's 33rd consecutive season in the top-flight of Chinese football. It covered a period from 1 January 2023 to 31 December 2023.

Guoan finished 6th in the domestic league, and was a quarter-finalist in this season's Chinese FA Cup.

== Summary ==
=== Pre-season ===
With the 2-year renovation at Guoan's traditional home ground, Workers' Stadium, completed before the 2023 campaign, it was confirmed that Guoan will return to the 68,000-seat refurbished stadium for the 2023 season.

On 11 January, media reports confirmed that Zhang Yuning, the team's top goalscorer last season, would stay with the team in 2023 despite rumors of him transferring to play for European clubs. On 14 January, UAE Pro League's Al-Nasr announced that it had signed Samir Memišević, confirming that his loan to Guoan had ended and will not be renewed.

On 14 January, long-time Beijing-based reporter Qi Le published an online article that recounted Guoan's difficulty in paying players' and staff's wages, and the team's resulting FIFA player registration ban, over the past years. According to the article, Guoan still owed wages to former players and staff including Fernando, Jonathan Viera, Renato Augusto, and Slaven Bilić and his coaching staff. Additionally, Guoan still owed Famalicão fees related to the transfer of Anderson Silva. The team, however, have made some progress in terms of paying back outstanding salaries, and Qi expected the team to be on healthier financial grounds with the league returning to normal and China relaxing its COVID-19 policies. Qi's reporting also confirmed that the team has extended its contract with veteran players Wang Gang and Zou Dehai. However, later reports in March confirms that Guoan has resolved all the outstanding wages and international transfer disputes, allowing for the club to be registered for the 2023 Super League season and register player transfers without issues. The Chinese FA officially confirmed on 13 March that Guoan has cleared itself of unpaid historical debt and wages.

On 1 February, Norwegian club Ranheim announced the signing of Hou Yongyong, confirming that he has left the team after his contract ended at the conclusion of 2022.

In early February, the Sport & Leisure channel for the local Beijing Radio and Television Station ran a special TV feature titled "Farewell Season." In it, BRTV reporters confirmed that veteran players Yu Yang, Jin Pengxiang, Jin Taiyan, Liu Huan and youngster Liu Guobo have left the team after their contracts with the club expired at the end of the 2022 season. Additional reports claim that while Li Ke's contract with the club expired at the end of 2022, he has continued his rehabilitation and returned to the team during pre-season with the hope of earning a new contract via participating in team training.

The team regrouped on 6 February and traveled to Hainan on 8 February to begin the winter training camp ahead of the new season. Top goalscorer from last season Zhang Yuning did not join the team as he was still recovering from a shoulder surgery, but Samuel Adegbenro traveled with the team.

On 13 February, Guoan announced that Croatian striker Marko Dabro have been loaned out to Latvian club Riga for the 2023 season.

On 25 February, the team played its first friendly against Changchun Yatai in Hainan. Guoan played with a mixture of first team and youth team players, and won 3–0 thanks to goals from Piao Cheng, Jiang Wenhao and Samuel Adegbenro.

On 26 February, reports emerged that Guoan had signed winger Yang Liyu from Guangzhou and former player Li Lei, who left Guoan for Swiss club Grasshopper, was set to return ahead of the new season. Guoan has also signed a new contract with Li Ke after deeming him physically fit to play for the club during winter training camp.

On 1 March, Guoan played its second training match of the pre-season against Dalian Pro. Guoan emerged victorious with goals from Kang Sang-woo, Xu Dongdong and Yan Yu, and a double by Cao Yongjing. Guoan won 5–1 at the final whistle and the team went on a small break. The team returned to training on 7 March in Hainan and will remain there until 23 March. New signings Li Lei, Yang Liyu and Josef de Souza are expected to join the team during training camp soon. 7 March also saw Croatian media confirm Macedonian midfielder Arijan Ademi's impending transfer to Guoan from Croatian team Dinamo Zagreb. For a transfer fee of €1 million, he is reported to have signed a 3-year contract with the team earning €1.65 million per season. Additional reports confirmed Guoan's signing of right-back Feng Boxuan from Henan Songshan Longmen as he joined team training on 7 March as well.

Guoan played another training match on 11 March against Tianjin Jinmen Tigers. Guoan lost the game 1–2 as Tianjin featured 4 foreign players and none of Guoan's new signings took part in the game. Jian Wenhao, playing at left back, scored Guoan's only goal. 6 days later on 17 March, Guoan played a training match against CMCL team Shanghai Mitsubishi Heavy Industries Flying Lion. New singing Feng Boxuan, Li Lei, and Yang Liyu featured in the game. Thanks to goals from Tian Yuda, Li Boxi and Yang Liyu, Guoan emerged victorious 3–0. The team's last training match in Hainan was played against reigning CSL champion Wuhan Three Towns on 23 March. Thanks to goal from Yu Dabao and Kang Sang-woo, the team won 2–1. After the game, Guoan returned to Beijing and will regroup on 27 March. On 29 March, the Chinese FA officially confirmed Guoan's eligibility to participate in the 2023 Chinese Super League, and the season ticket sale subsequently opened on the same day.

On 30 March, Guoan officially announced the signings of 8 players. Besides the rumored De Souza, Arijan Ademi, Ngadeu-Ngadjui, Li Lei, Yang Liyu, Fang Hao, and Feng Boxuan, Beijing-born goalkeeper Han Jiaqi also joined the team after his former club Guangzhou City failed to clear the financial rules to stay in the CSL. Han will wear the number 1 shirt after Hou Sen willingly gave it away.

On 31 March, Guoan played a training match with Tianjin Jinmen Tiger. Adegbenro scored for Guoan from a header, and the game ended in a 1–1 draw. Ruan Qilong was injured in the first half and had to be substituted off immediately.

On 7 April, Guoan played their last pre-season friendly ahead of the 2023 CSL season kicking off on 15 April, against Nantong Zhiyun, which ended in a 0–0 draw. Guoan returned to Beijing and on 8 April launched this season's new kits along with announcing their new shirt sponsor, JD.com, at Workers' Stadium.

=== April ===
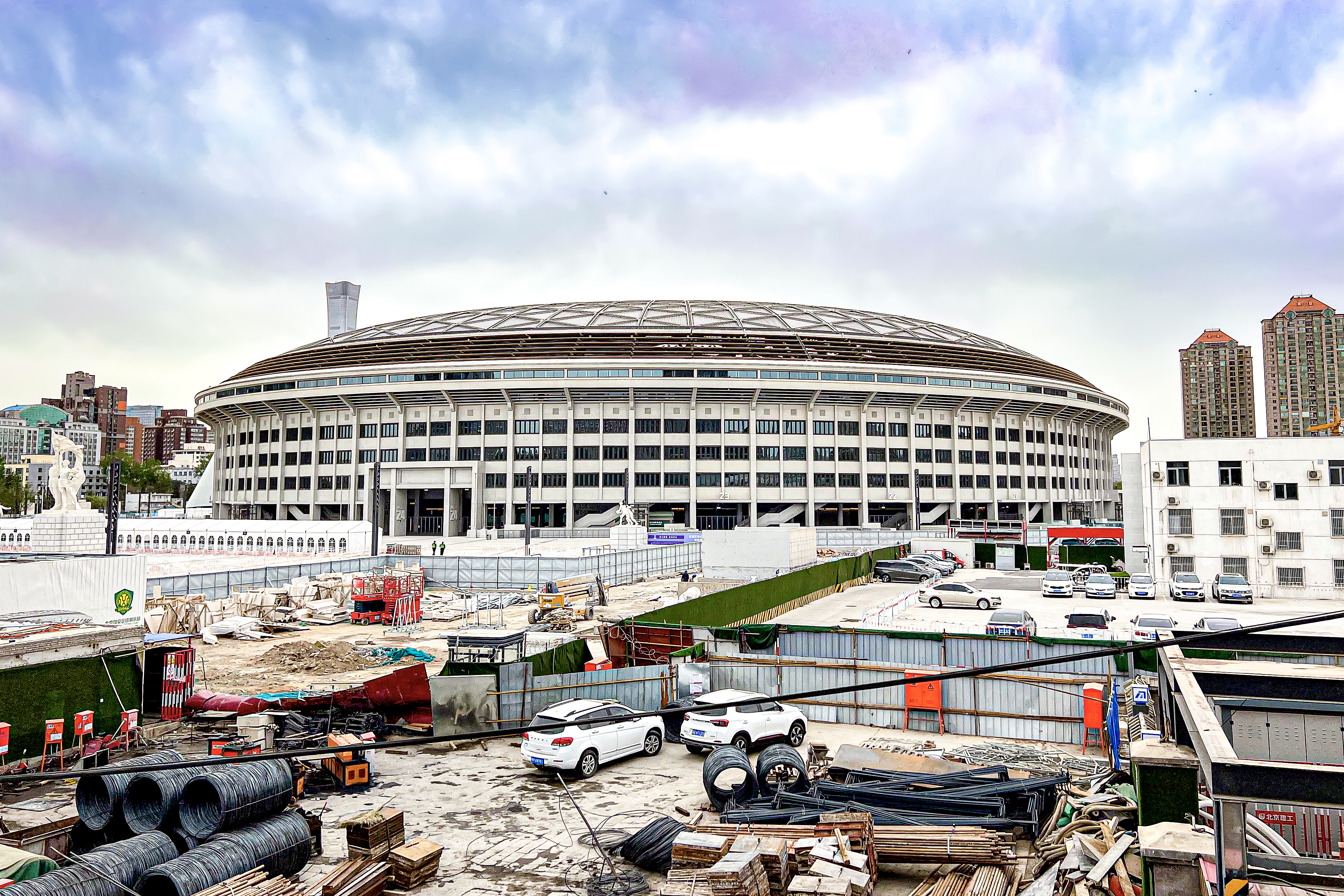
Outside of the Workers' Stadium hours before the first game of the season on 15 April 2023

On 15 April, Guoan's season officially commenced with a return to the brand new Workers' Stadium in front of over 46,000 fans for its first Super League home game since late 2019 against Meizhou Hakka. With Zhang Yuning still injured, Guoan lined up with Yang Liyu up top supported by new signings Ademi, Souza, and Ngadeu along with returning Li Lei. The first goal of the game and in the new Workers' Stadium, instead of coming from a Guoan player, came from Meizhou's Ye Chugui in the 19th minute after a missed header in Guoan's box allowed Ye a clean shot to the near post. Guoan continued its attack but failed to score in the first half. In the 49th minute, Ademi was tripped in Meizhou's penalty area by Rade Dugalić and the referee Ma Ning awarded Guoan a penalty after extensive VAR review. Zhang Xizhe, the club's all-time top scorer, stepped up and converted the shot, tying the game at 1–1. Despite attempts by both sides, the game ended in a 1–1 draw with Guoan failing to secure an opening victory in the new season and the new stadium.

20 April saw Guoan face reigning league champions Wuhan Three Towns away from home. Menzo made a number of personnel changes, opting to give new transfer Han Jiaqi his first start at Guoan replacing Zou Dehai while starting both Gao Tianyi and Wang Ziming instead of Chi Zhongguo and the injured Adgebenro. Two teams traded chances in the first half with Wuhan seeming the better team, but Han Jiaqi's saves frustrated a number of good opportunities for Wuhan. Attempting to change the tempo of the game, Menzo replaced Wang Ziming with Kang Sang-woo at the start of the second half. In the 62nd minute, Guoan took the lead through Yang Liyu after Wuhan's keeper Liu Dianzuo erroneously gave the ball away inside his own box. In the final stages of the game, Wuhan brought on strikers hoping to make a difference, and indeed broke through Guoan's goal in the 92nd minute with substitute Ademilson. The game ended in a 1–1 draw. After 2 opening draws, Guoan sat 8th in the table.

Guoan played newly promoted Qingdao Hainiu away on 25 April with both teams winless after 2 rounds. Only 8 minutes into the game, Ngadeu-Ngadjui was judged after a VAR review to have handled the ball inside Guoan's penalty area with his hand and thereby conceding a penalty. Elvis Sarić subsequently converted the goal for Qingdao. In the 26th minute after Guoan players' failure to clear a corner by Qingdao, Aleksandar Andrejević attempted a shot on the edge of the area. Despite having gotten fingers across to the ball, Han Jiaqi was unable to stop it from going in, resulting in a 2–0 disadvantage for Guoan. At halftime, Menzo replaced Adegbenro with Kang Sang-woo and Wang Ziming with Zhang Yuning, giving Zhang his first cap after recovering from a shoulder injury. Despite the changes, Guoan conceded again just one minute into the second half as de Souza failed to deal with a header in midfield, allowing Evans Kangwa to carry the ball forward and slide it past Wang Gang and Han Jiaqi. Guoan pulled a goal back in the 50th minute thanks to de Souza converting from a corner chaos. Li Ke returned from injury and replaced Zhang Xizhe for his first cap in 2 years late in the game. Guoan dominated possession in the latter stages of the game, but was unable to find a way through Qingdao's defense, ending the game with a 3–1 defeat and extending the winless streak to 3 games. In the post-game press conference, Menzo blamed bad luck for the first goal conceded and praised Qingdao's attack for the second.

Guoan played rival Shandong Taishan on matchday 4 of the Super League on 29 April. The game was attended by 50,312 people, making it the highest attended game in this season. Despite attack from both sides, however, both teams failed to find a way through the opposition goal and the game ended in a 1–1 draw. After a winless 4 games with only 3 points, Guoan sat deep in the table close to the relegation zone at 13th place after the conclusion of matchday 4. The game also marked Wang Gang's 100th appearance for the club in all competitions.

=== May ===
The team traveled to Zhengzhou on 4 May ahead of its game against Henan. During the pre-match press conference, Menzo stated that the team had made some adjustment to its tactical approach given its winless streak, and hoped that the team will be back to its winning ways soon. On 5 May, Menzo lined up Yang Liyu and Zhang Yuning up front with 4 midfielders behind. Both team notched up a few chances in the first half, but the game stayed 0–0 at the half thanks to Han Jiaqi consecutively denying two Henan shots in the 25th minute. In the 56th minute, Li Ke sent the ball to the left, Wang Gang knocked in back into the Henan's penalty box, and Yang Liyu finished off the movement with a clean strike inside the area to the bottom right corner of the goal, giving Guoan the 1–0 lead. After creating chances but failing to score, Henan players got upset and Toni Šunjić was yellow-carded for shoving Fang Hao to the ground. Guoan ended the game with a 1–0 away win, giving the team the first victory of the season and ending a 4-game winless streak. Post-game fan conducts from both teams drew criticism. Henan officials complained to the Chinese FA about Guoan fans cursing and throwing objects at Henan players while Guoan complained about refereeing regarding Šunjić's foul on Fang Hao and the team and fans being stranded in stadium for 2 hours after the game due to agitated Henan fans refusing to leave the stadium complex. Šunjić was issued a 5-match ban on 8 May for violent conduct for his foul on Fang Hao by the Chinese FA.

Guoan returned to Workers' Stadium on 10 May to host Tianjin Jinmen Tigers. Zhang Yuning and Souza were both injured prior to the game and did not feature in the starting line-up, and Menzo opted to play Adegbenro up front with Chi Zhongguo as the holding midfielder. Guoan started the game poorly, having only 38% of the possession in the first 10 minutes due to aggressive pressing from Tianjin. However, the team grew into the game and generated a few good chances. Just before the end of the first half, though, Tianjin created a wave of attack around Guoan's goal with Han Jiaqi having to force a few saves to keep the game level at the half. Tianjin made substitutions first, returning with two foreign players Fran Mérida and Robert Berić to start the second half. Ngadeu had headed the ball into Tianjin's goal in the 58th minute, but it was ruled out as he was judged to have started his run in an offside position. Unexpectedly in the 63rd minute, Guoan obtained a man advantage as Tianjin player Ming Tian was sent off after receiving a second yellow card for a handball violation. The team failed to take advantage, though, conceding to former player Ba Dun's strike from outside the box during a Tianjin counter-attack in the 68th minute. Ba refused to celebrate against his former club. A goal down, Menzo brought on Piao Cheng, Wang Ziming and Yu Dabao in attacking positions in attempts to turn the game around. The plan seemed to when Wang Ziming headed in a Wang Gang cross from the right wing in the 81st minute, restoring the game level at 1–1. Yu Dabao, playing as striker, headed in another just moments later, but Fang Hao was judged to have roughed the Tianjin goalie during the process and the goal was ruled out. Guoan generated other chances through Li Lei and Wang Ziming, but failed to score another goal. The game ended in a 1–1 draw. After the game, Guoan sat 8th in the league table with 7 points.

Still without a home win, Guoan hosted Nantong Zhiyun on 15 May. Zhang Yuning remains injured and did not feature in the team sheet while Josef de Souza returned to the starting lineup. Guoan seemed the better team in the first 20 minutes, producing opportunities from corners and combinations. In the 23rd minute, after a quick counter by Guoan and a deflected Li Lei cross, Ademi put Guoan in the front with a cracking mid-air strike inside the box that bounced into the Nantong goal from the underside of the crossbar. Guoan seemed rejuvenated and created a few more chances via Souza and Gao Tianyi; although failing to score, the team entered half-time with a lead for the first time this season. Searching for another goal, Menzo brought on Zhang Xizhe and Yu Dabao. However, after trading chances, no team would go on to score another goal by the end of the match. Han Jiaqi made a number of reactionary saves throughout the game to keep the clean sheet, including a crucial intervention that denied Nantong a header inside the box in the 89th minute. Guoan ended the game 1–0, securing the team's first home victory of the season and moving up 1 spot to 7th in the league.

Guoan traveled to Shanghai and played long-time rival Shanghai Shenhua on 19 May. Shenhua was expected to be the better team given their joint-first in terms of points on the league table before the match. Additionally, a number of Guoan players was injured or out sick, leading Menzo to name Nebijan Muhmet to his match of the season at left back with Zhang Chengdong filling in at right back. Shenhua was the better team to start the match, scoring in the 18th minute as Cephas Malele knocked a high ball down and teed up Yu Hanchao to slide it into the far corner against the post. Guoan ended the first half without registering a single shot on target, but did not concede a second goal. In the second half, Guoan became the better team. In the 58th minute, Kang Sang-woo tricked Shenhua's oncoming goalkeeper and dribbled passed him, but his shot was on an open goal was cleared by a Shenhua defender. Guoan broke through in the 67th minute via Adegbenro, who slid a curve ball toward the far corner after Zhang Xizhe's one-two pass set Adegbenro up inside the box. Chi Zhongguo and Yang Liyu, respectively, had their attempts saved in the 72nd and 73rd minute, and Yu Dabao hit the crossbar in the 82nd from 30 meters out after coming on from the bench. However, Guoan failed to score another goal, and the game ended in a 1–1 draw. Zhang Xizhe, coming on as a substitute, completed his 300th appearance for Guoan in the Super League.

Guoan returned home on 23 May, facing off Cangzhou Mighty Lions. While Cangzhou sat lower on the league table, Menzo cautioned in the pre-game press conference against Cangzhou's counterattack, and Yang Liyu remarked that there was only a very short break between this match and the previous one. Before the game started, a small ceremony was held inside Workers' Stadium to celebrate Zhang Xizhe's 300 league appearances for the club. However, it was Cangzhou that scored first in the 7th minute through a quick attack that resulted in a cross which bounced past Han Jiaqi and was put into the net by Oscar Maritu. After a Wang Ziming headed was ruled offside in the 13th minute, Zhang Xizhe opened the scoring for Guoan in the 15th minute after Kang Sang-woo set him up for a shot around the edge of the box that deflected into the net. Cangzhou struck back in the 24th minute as Han Jiaqi misjudged a shot and his delayed save failed to keep the ball out of the net. Guoan did not gave up, and retaliated in the 31st minute when Wang Ziming pressed the opposition defender off the ball and struck it firmly into the net. Kang Sang-woo gave Guoan a 3–2 lead into half time, finishing off an over-the-top pass from Ademi. In the second half, Wang Ziming doubled up in the 52nd minute with a header from a Gao Tianyi corner. The assist provider himself would score in the 57th minute after Kang Sang-woo forced a defender error, rounded the goalkeeper, and squared the ball to Gao Tianyi for a tap-in. In the 62nd minute, a Chi Zhongguo long ball was awkwardly cleared by Cangzhou's goalie, allowing Yang Liyu to score another for Guoan at a tight angle. Youngster Jiang Wenhao made his league debut, coming on for Ademi in the 84th minute. Guoan ended the game with a 6–2 home victory, extending an unbeaten streak to 6 games.

Guoan's last game in May was away against Zhejiang on 28 May. Both team opened by attacking, but it was Guoan who took the lead in the 10th minute when Souza sent Kang Sang-woo straight toward goal with a through ball. Zhejiang quickly pulled one back via a quick counter-attack in the 19th minute. In the 51st minute, Ngadeu ventured forward and sent a cross into the box from the right wing, and an unmarked Bai Yang headed in the goal to score his first career goal. Just two minutes later, however, former Guoan player Li Tixiang dangled a cross across Guoan's goal, and Mushekwi headed it goalwards for Zhejiang; while Han Jiaqi reacted and made an apparent save, referee awarded the goal for Zhejiang after VAR review, deeming it had crossed the goal line. In the 72nd minute, Guoan would concede again as Li Tixiang assisted a corner goal. Guoan ended the game with a 3–2 loss, snapping a 7-game undefeated streak but remained 7th on the league table. With the team having led twice but ultimately unable to defend the lead, Menzo commented in the post-game press conference that he believed the team should not have lost, but various errors in midfield cost Guoan control of the game. Menzo's substitution choices and their timings were criticized by the media.

=== June ===
Guoan's first June game came at home against Changchun Yatai. Ahead of the match, key players such as Zhang Yuning and Zhang Xizhe remain injured and could not feature in the game. The game proved to be an open match. In the 22nd minute, Guoan conceded first as a sloppy control by Li Lei gave the ball away, resulting in an easy shot by Leonardo. Moments later in the 29th minute, Feng Boxuan delivered a pull-back cross from the right wing, allowing Souza, unmarked, to knock the ball into the net and equalize the game for Guoan. Yang Liyu's header hit the crossbar in the 32nd minute, and Yatai had a goal disallowed for offside by VAR in the 36th. In the 41st minute, Guoan took the lead with Gao Tianyi sending a cross in from the right wing, which Souza headed into the net. The second half started poorly for Guoan, conceding 2 in the 49th and 65th minute respectively. However, the team fought back in the 66th minute with a Gao Tianyi through ball that Yang Liyu finished off at a tight angle. Guoan notched its 4th of the game in the 86th minute after Li Ke won the ball in midfield chaos and delivered a pass to Kang Sang-woo, which the latter put past Yatai's keeper. Guoan won the match 4–3, extending its home unbeaten run to 6 matches.

On 6 June, the club announced that Han Jiaqi had won the club's best player award for April and May. Han also won the CSL's goalkeeper of the month award on the same day.

Guoan played Dalian Pro away on 9 June. Guoan conceded first 16 minutes into the game with Lobi Manzoki firing a header past Han Jiaqi. Right before the half time whistle, Guoan conceded again with Manzoki scoring double. In the 51st minute, a penalty was given against Guoan as Michael Ngadeu was judged to have impeded Lin Liangming by the referee on the field. After VAR review, however, the penalty was revoked due to Lin's previous foul. Guoan pulled one goal back in the 77th minute after pressing by Yan Yu forced Dalian's defender to concede an own goal. In the 84th minute, Kang Sang-woo was fouled in the Dalian penalty area and he converted from the spot, bringing Guoan level at 2–2. The game remained at 2–2 until the end with Guoan slipping to 7th place at the conclusion of matchday 12.

On 11 June, the club relieved Stanley Menzo from his duties as the first team manager. Portuguese coach Ricardo Soares was announced as Menzo's replacement on 15 June. Soares' first game came on the 23 June in the Chinese FA Cup against lower-league opponent Zibo Qisheng. Soares opted for a rotation, resting all the foreign players. Guoan opened the scoring in the 9th minute as Yang Liyu finished off a Nebijan Muhmet cross from the right. The game remained 1–0 to the end, with Guoan qualifying to play against Qingdao West Coast in the fourth round.

29 June saw Soares make his league coaching debut against league leader Shanghai Port at home. In what proved to be a heated match, Guoan would make a break through first in the 39th minute through Nebijan Muhmet. However, after a VAR review, Muhmet's goal was ruled out as he was judged to have been marginally offside. Just four minutes later, Lü Wenjun scored for Shanghai Port, giving them the lead at half time. In the 65th minute, Guoan conceded again from a stunner that scrapped in the goal via the right goalpost. In the 81st minute, Guoan pulled one back from Fang Hao as he capitalized on a Shanghai Port's defender's failure to clear the ball. However, Guoan was unable to make further inroads, and ended the game with a 1–2 defeat, the team's first home defeat since returning to the Workers' Stadium.

=== July ===
3 July saw Guoan travel to Chengdu to face Chengdu Rongcheng in the 14th matchday of the CSL. Rongcheng entered the game without a defeat over the previous 13 matchdays and started strong, testing Guoan's goal three times in the first 10 minutes of the game. Worse for Guoan, Li Lei injured himself in the 10th minute chasing down Chengdu players and was replaced by Zhang Chengdong. Despite the difficult situation, Guoan broke through first in the 23rd minute. Adegbenro tested Chengdu's keeper, and Chengdu's defender failed to clear the ball properly, allowing Souza to set up Nebijan who slid the ball into the net for a 1–0 Guoan lead. Both teams traded chances but Chengdu was ultimately unable to break through, allowing Guoan to take a 1–0 victory away from home.

Five days later on 8 July, Guoan played Shenzhen at home. Just four minutes into the game, Piao Cheng opened the scoring for Guoan after the Shenzhen keeper spilled the ball. In the 40th minute, Shenzhen's Li Ning was deemed to have committed a serious foul while chasing down Adegbenro and was shown a direct red card, giving Guoan the man advantage. The team took good advantage, with Nebijan Muhmet setting Wang Ziming up for a close-range goal in the 2nd minute of added time in the first half. A man up, Guoan played only better. Wang Ziming tapped in his second of the game with his thigh after a Fang Hao strike bounced back into the box, putting Guoan 3–0 up. In the 84th minute, Feng Boxuan launched one from outside the box, resulting in a 4–0 lead for Guoan. Wang Ziming would finish the game off with his third in the 85th minute after sliding the ball into the net from an interception up the field. Guoan won the game 5–0, the largest margin of the year.

The momentum of the win did not carry over when Guoan challenged Meizhou Hakka just 4 days later on 12 July. Hakka opened the scoring in the 19th minute through give-and-go play, and Guoan conceded another in the 31st minute. In added time for the first half, Han Jiaqi deflected a ball into Guoan's own net, leaving Guoan 0–3 down at the half. Soares opted to substitute four players at half time, but the tactical changes failed to make a difference. Wang Ziming pulled one back in the 85th minute, but it was too late. Guoan lost the game 1–3.

Guoan returned to the Workers' Stadium to host Wuhan Three Towns on 16 July. Guoan scored first after Ademi's cross from the right wing was finished off by Fang Hao in the 15th minute. However, after holding on for the majority of the game, Guoan conceded in the 81st minute as Li Yang sent a header into Guoan's net from an indirect free kick. Guoan drew the reigning champion 1–1.

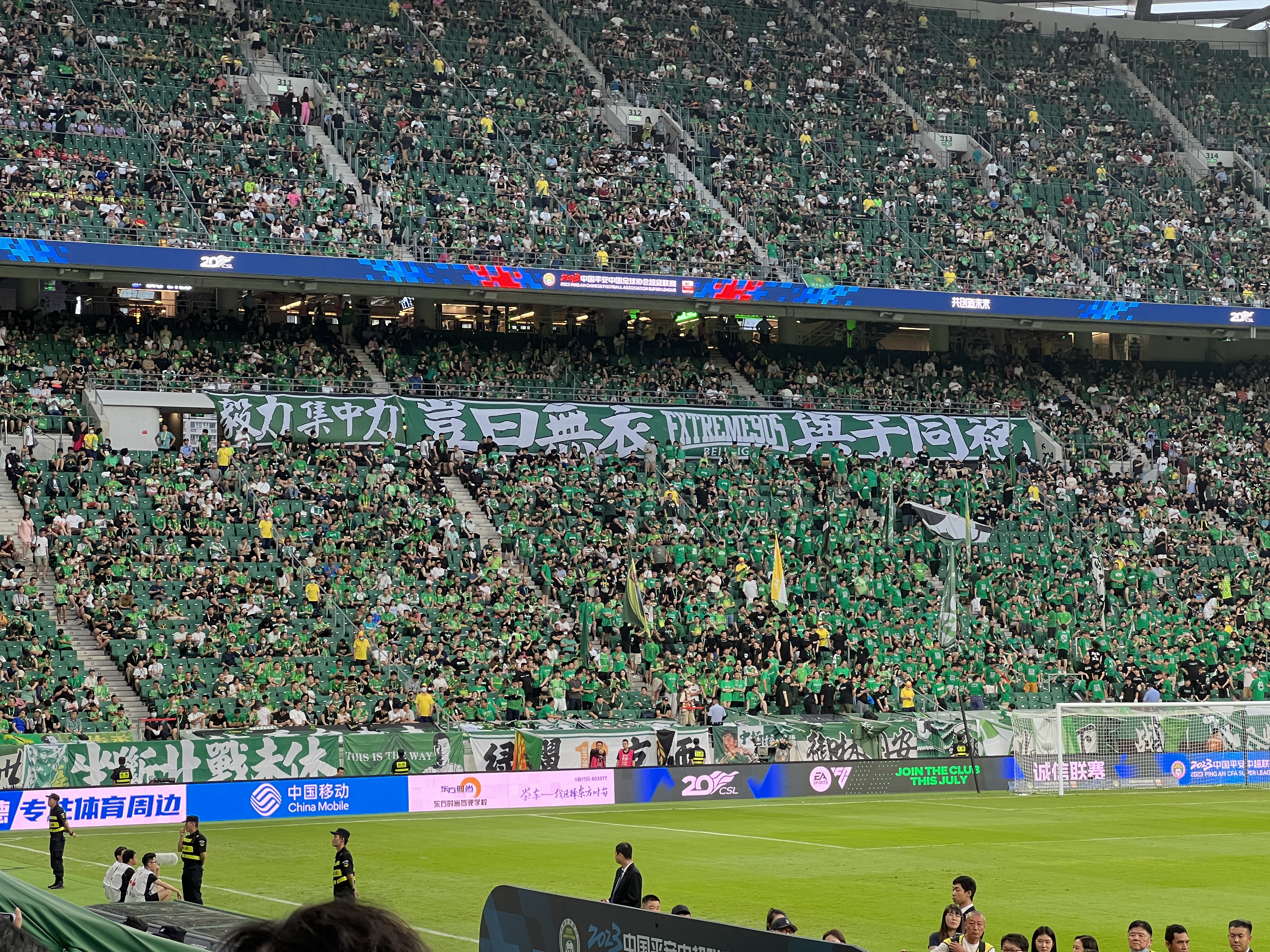
Guoan Ultras in the North Stand ahead of the Game against Wuhan Three Towns.

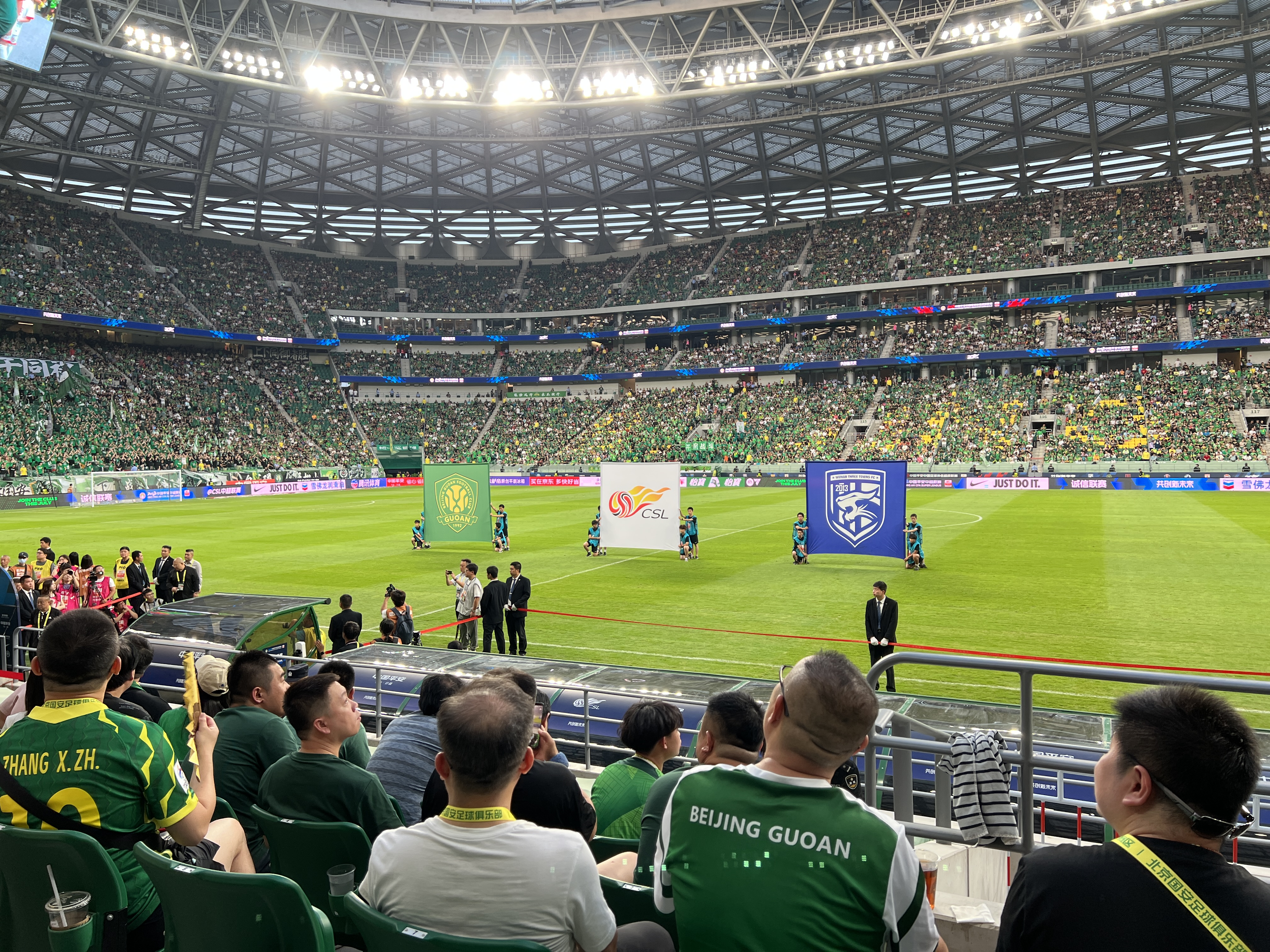
Inside Workers' Stadium ahead of the Game against Wuhan Three Towns.

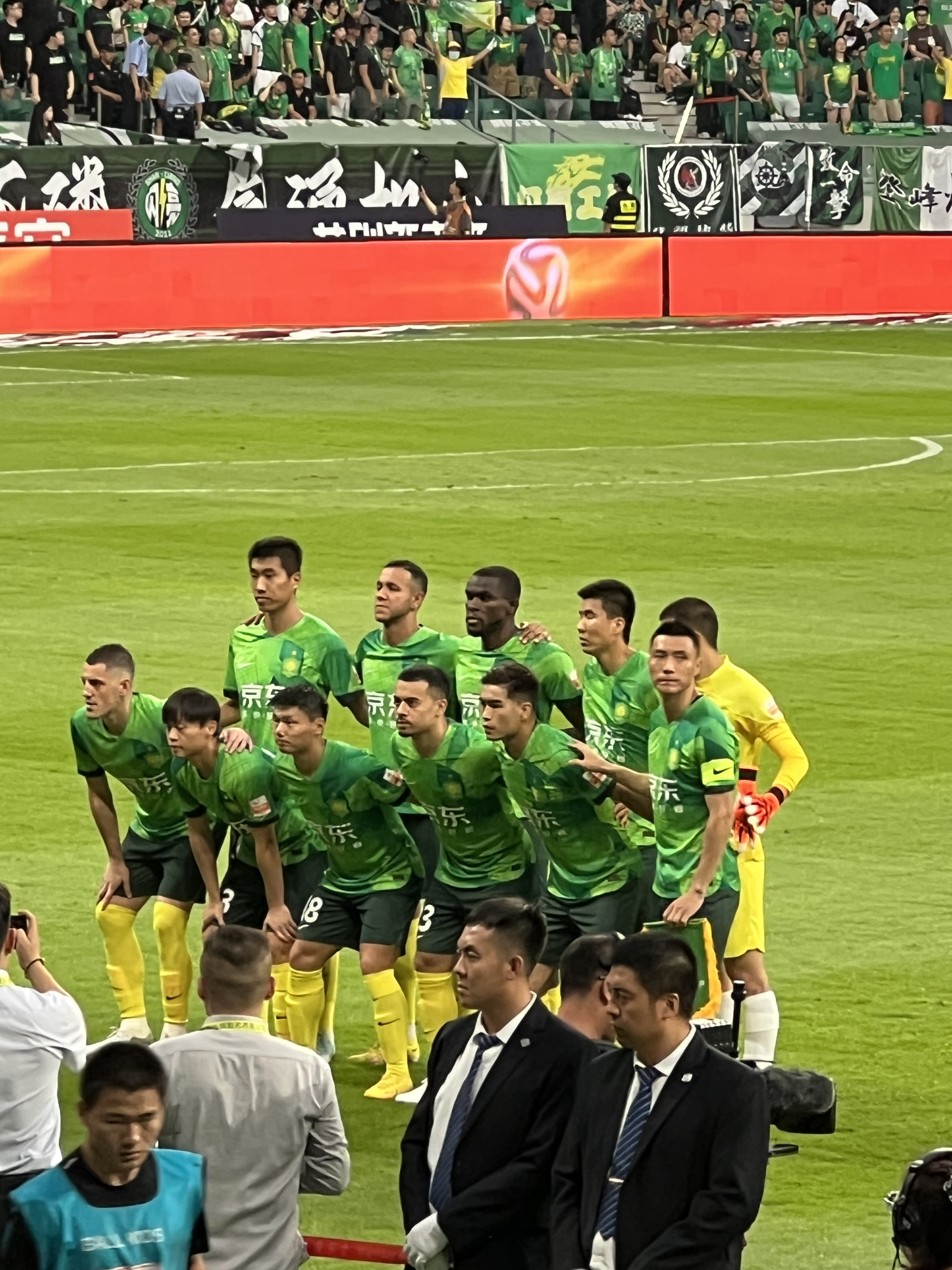
Guoan's Starting Line-up against Wuhan Three Towns.

On 17 July, Guoan announced the signing of striker Fábio Abreu from Emirati club Khor Fakkan. As CSL rules permit only the registration of five foreign players, Adegbenro's registration was withdrawn to make space for Abreu for the remainder of the season.

Guoan played at home against Qingdao Hainiu on 22 July. After a first half with no goals, Ademi scored for Guoan in the 51st minute after Nebijan Muhmet's shot was denied by the opposition goalie but rebounded back into play. In the 79th minute, new signing Abreu, in his league debut, slid a pass to Kang Sang-woo, who calmly finished into the net to give Guoan a 2–0 lead, which would hold until the final whistle.

On 26 July, Guoan traveled to Qingdao to play against lower league Qingdao West Coast in the fifth round of the Chinese FA Cup. In the 18th minute, Abreu grabbed his first goal for Guoan after the opposition failed to clear the ball. Nebijan Muhmet tagged on a second in the 38th minute after Yu Dabao's header set him up. In the second half, Abreu doubled up in the 49th minute for a simple tap-in after the opposition defense failed to deal properly with Guoan's press. Despite conceding in the 53rd minute, Guoan scored again in the 72nd through Fang Hao, ending the game with a 4–1 victory and advancing to the sixth round, in which the team would face old rival Shangdong Taishan.

Guoan announced the signing of midfielder Zhang Yuan from Shenzhen on 30 July. He signed on a free transfer after he negotiated with Shenzhen for his contract to be terminated. Later in the day, Guoan played away against Shandong Taishan. After trading attacks, Guoan player Jiang Wenhao was judged to have handled the ball with his arm in the 43rd minute, resulting in a penalty for Shandong. Shandong's Liao Lisheng, however, missed the opportunity to score as he hit the left post with his attempt. The first half ended in a goalless draw. In the second half, Guoan conceded a header first in the 59th minute. In the 73rd minute, Han Jiaqi misjudged the ball and allowed it to skip between his legs, giving Shandong a 2–0 lead. Guoan conceded a third in the 90th minute in a counter-attack situation, losing the game 3–0, the widest margin of the season thus far. Additional controversy occurred when Fang Hao, formerly a Shandong player, donned a Shandong jersey and thanked Shandong fans after the game. Some Guoan fans saw Fang's display of gratitude to a rival immediately after a bitter defeat as an affront to the team, while Fang explained that he was saddened by the loss and the fact that he was not chosen by the coach to take part in the game, that wearing the Shandong jersey was simply to fulfill a promise made to a blood relative, and that he would continue to fight for Guoan.

=== August ===
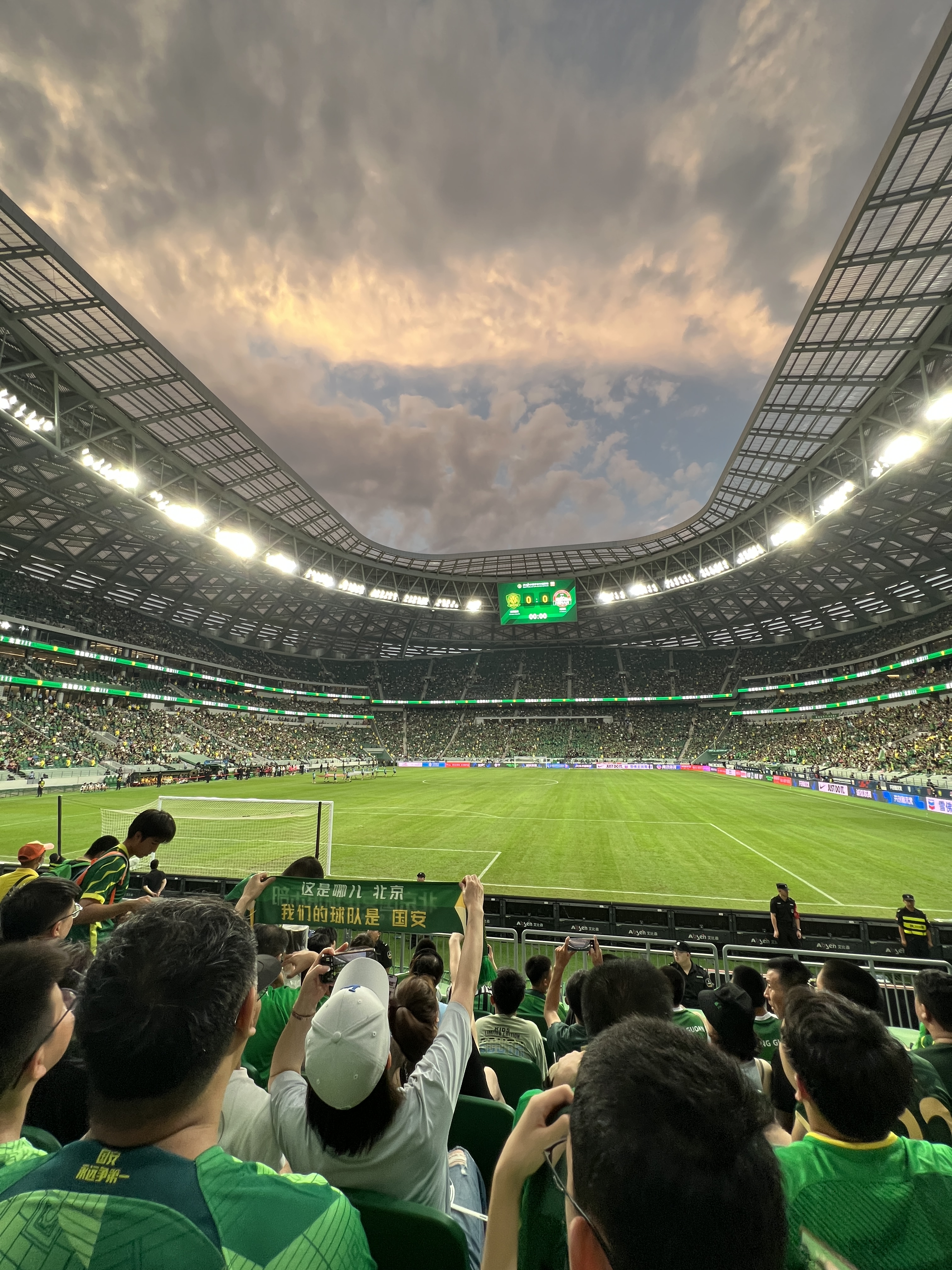
Workers' Stadium ahead of the 4 August 2023 match against Henan

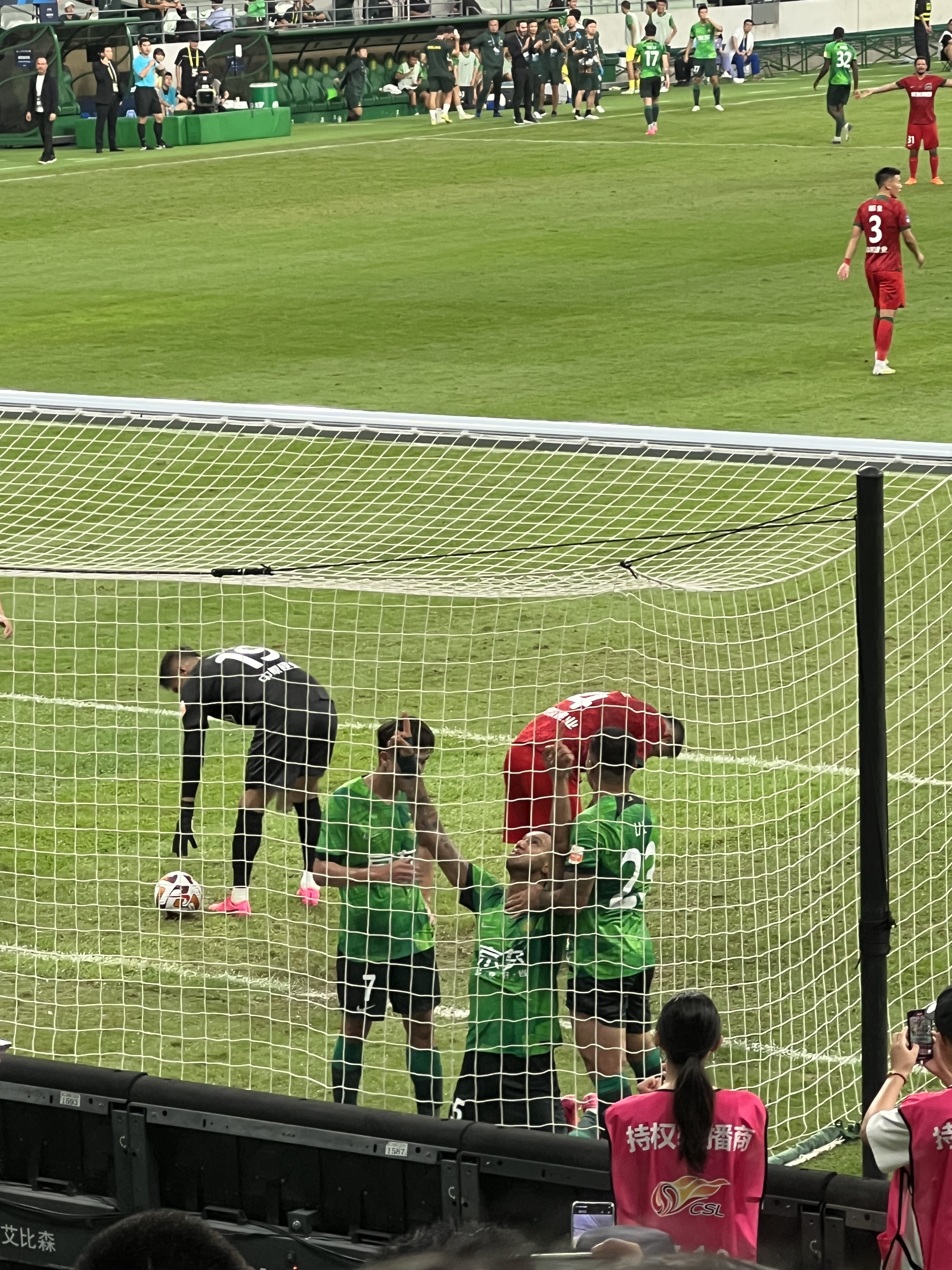
Josef de Souza celebrating his 43rd-minute goal against Henan on 4 August 2023

The 4th of August saw Guoan play against Henan at home. The team's ultras refused to chant for the club in the first 15 minutes of the game as a protest to the team's poor performance against Shandong. Although the team needed to recover from the 0–3 defeat, Guoan conceded only 4 minutes into the game. The team reacted quickly, though, with Kang Sang-woo finishing off a threaded pass from Gao Tianyi to bring the game even in the 8th minute. In the 42nd minute, Guoan took the lead via Souza, who tapped the ball into the net after Abreu sent in a cross from the right wing that skipped past all defenders and the goalkeeper. Henan created a number of dangerous chances in the second half, but it was Guoan that finished the game off in the 88th minute. Fang Hao, whose action after the Shandong match earned him boos from the home fans when he was substituted on, battled valiantly for the ball before eventually setting Chi Zhongguo up for a 1-on-1 against the Henan keeper, which Chi calmly tucked into the net. Fang received supportive applauses and chants as the fans recognized his effort. Guoan ended the game with a 3–1 comeback victory.

On 9 August, Guoan faced off against Tianjin Jinmen Tiger in neighboring Tianjin. It was Tianjin which started the game off well, forcing Guoan's wing-backs Wang Gang and Feng Boxuan to concede yellow cards within 15 minutes. In the 37th minute, Ngadeu-Ngadjui made an importance clearance off the line after Hou Sen had been dribbled past, keeping the game tied. Both teams continued to have opportunities in the second half, but neither could convert and the game ended in a goalless draw. New signing Zhang Yuan made his debut for the club in the 90th minute, replacing veteran Chi Zhongguo.

13 August saw Guoan travel to Rugao to face Nantong Zhiyun. Both team desire a victory as Nantong is without a win in the last 10 games, and Guoan need to shake off the 0–0 draw from the previous matchday. Yang Liyu attempted a volley from the right in the 6th minute, but was handled well by Nantong's keeper. Kang Sang-woo's heading attempt in the 15th was also dealt well by the opposition goalie. Nantong generated a number of chances through Rubilio Castillo, and Abreu tried his luck with a powerful shot in the 15th, but neither team scored in the first half. Switching sides, Guoan strengthened the attack. Kang Sang-woo, Yang Liyu, Abreu, and Chi Zhongguo all landed chances in the 15 minutes after play resumed. In the 60th minute, captain of the game Zhang Xizhe swung in a corner from the left, and Ngadeu-Ngadjui back-heeled the ball into Nantong's goal in the air with his right foot, giving Guoan the 1–0 lead. Substitute Wang Ziming hit the post in the 95th minute off of a counter, and Guoan held on to celebrate a 1–0 victory after the final whistle.

Guoan hosted old rival Shanghai Shenhua in the Workers' Stadium on 19 August in what was the team's 1,000th professional match and the biggest fan showing of the season so far with 52,500 spectators packing the stadium. The home fans opened the game with a full-stadium TIFO commemorating the occasion. Guoan went down first in the 14th minute with Christian Bassogog scoring a stunner past Hou Sen's near post, giving Shenhua the 1–0 lead early. Just three minutes later, both teams were forced to make their first substitutions as Guoan's Jiang Wenhao had a clash of heads with Shenhua's Yang Zexiang. Both players were bleeding from the head and were taken off immediately; Li Lei replaced Jiang Wenhao in his first appearance since his injury earlier in the season. In the 28th minute, Guoan equalized the game after a series of intricate passes led to Zhang Xizhe knocking the ball to Kang Sang-woo, who swept the ball across the Shenhua box for Abreu to turn and finish into the net. Zhang Xizhe had a good chance in the 32nd minute, but his unmarked shot from the top of the box went over the crossbar. In the 37th minute, a Guoan attack down the right wing allowed Zhang Xizhe to send a curving cross into the box, and Abreu rose high in the air to head the ball past Shenhua's keeper, turning the game on his head and giving Guoan the 2–1 lead ahead of halftime. In the 57th minute, Hou Sen shut down Bassogog's close-range shot inside the box, but he was sent off just three minutes later for denying a clear Cephas Malele chance as the last man. Han Jiaqi came on as the substitute keeper. Shenhua strengthened their attack as they had the man advantage, but the 2–1 score would hold to the end, elevating Guoan into 4th on the league table after 23 matchdays.

Guoan traveled to play against Cangzhou Mighty Lions on 26 August. In the 10th minute, Zhang Xizhe's freekick was deflected by Cangzhou defender into his own net, giving Guoan a 1–0 lead. 5 minutes later, Zhang Xizhe himself would score a long-range shot after Abreu set the up the chance, putting Guoan two goals ahead. In the 43rd minute, Abreu sent the ball into the net from inside the box. Returning from break, Abreu doubled his tally after a Kang Sang-woo strike hit the crossbar in the 47th minute. Kang Sang-woo would get his own goal in the 53rd, allowing Guoan to lead away 5–0. Cangzhou scored a consolation goal in the 85th minute, and the game ended with a Guoan 5–1 victory. The match marked Guoan's first 3-game win streak this season, although both Wang Gang and Gao Tianyi earned the yellow card, meaning both would have to watch on the stands in the next matchday.

On 30 August, Samuel Adegbenro, whose registration had been withdrawn following the signing of Fábio Abreu, joined Norweigen club Viking on loan.

In the last game of August, Guoan was pitted against Shandong Taishan in the quarter-final round of the FA Cup. Shandong broke the deadlock in just 10 minutes, scoring off of a corner rebound. Guoan retaliated quickly, however, with Zhang Xizhe sending an over-the-top pass to Kang Sang-woo, who finished firmly against Shandong's Wang Dalei. Both teams failed to score again in regular time and extra time, moving the game to penalties. Shandong scored all 5 of its penalties, and Kang Sang-woo, Guoan's final taker, missed. The penalty loss marked Guoan's exit from this edition of the FA Cup.

=== September ===
On 8 September, Guoan announced that Ademi completed the transfer back to his old club Dinamo Zagreb. He capped 20 times for Guoan in all competitions, registering 2 goals and 2 assists. On 11 September, Abreu was awarded the CSL's best player of the month for August. One day later, Soares was awarded the CSL coach of the month award for the month of August having led the team to 4 wins and 1 draw. Abreu and Kang Sang-woo were also selected in the CSL team of the month.

Guoan's first match in September came on the 16th at home against Zhejiang directly after the international break. Guoan breached Zhejiang's goal on three separate occasions in the first half in the 3rd, 26th and 45th minute, but all three goals were later ruled offside. Guoan conceded once in the second half, and eventually lost the game 0–1, dropping the team to 6th on the table with 5 games left.

On 22 September, Guoan traveled to Changchun for the return match against Yatai. In the 12th minute, Li Ke threaded a pass through to an advancing Yang Liyu, who deftly played the ball across the face of the goal, setting up a simple tap-in for Abreu. However, Yatai leveled in the 33rd minute as Peter Žulj capitalized on a Guoan mistake during build-up. In the 37th minute, a Yatai handball in the penalty area while defending was ignored by the referee, and Soares' protest earned him a yellow card. Despite the game getting more aggressive in the second half, neither team were able to make progress. Soares received his second yellow card of the game and was sent off for protesting another referee decision during added time for the second half. In the end, Guoan walked away with a 1–1 tie and seeing its hopes for a top-three finish diminish.

On 27 September, the CFA issued a 7-match ban and a ¥70,000 fine against Zhang Xizhe, claiming that he had mouthed off with the assistant referee during the added minutes in the Changchun Yatai game. Guoan, refusing to accept the suspension and fine, published an official statement via the club's social media account hoping that "darkness will not forever cloud over this land" and urged the CFA to provide more evidence.

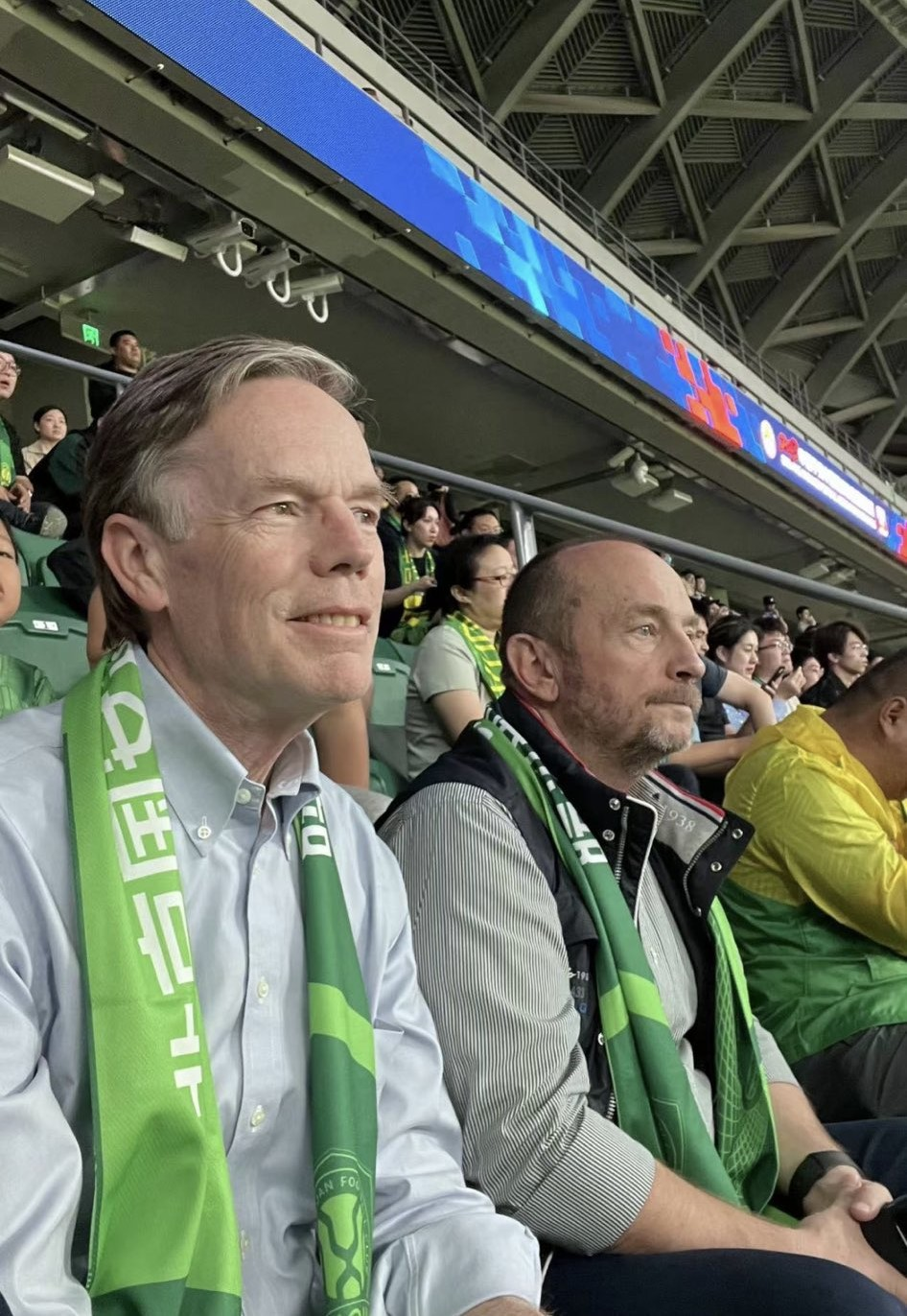
The United States Ambassador to China Nicholas Burns in the Guoan stands in September

Guoan played Dalian Pro at home on 30 September. Yu Dabao started the game in place of Zhang Xizhe as the latter served the first of his 7 match suspensions. After a lackluster first half, captain Yu Dabao assisted Yang Liyu for the opening goal in the 69th minute. Just 4 minutes later, a Chi Zhongguo long ball found an advancing Kang Sang-woo, who skipped past the defense and set Abreu up for the second Guoan goal. Guoan finished the game 2–0, advancing one place to 5th on the table.

=== October ===
After the international break, Guoan resumed its league campaign in a headliner against league leader Shanghai Port, which could clinch the league title at its home ground if it won the game, on 20 October. Soares, determined to give Guoan a chance to qualify for next season's Champions League, lined up Yu Dabao as an advanced midfielder in search for a change. Guoan took the first chance as Abreu headed a shot toward Port's goal, but it went over the bar. Momentum seemed to shift in Port's direction after a few threatening shots, but it was Guoan who took the lead first in the 24th minute with Wang Gang pressuring Port's goalie Yan Junling into slipping and giving Wang a goal. In the 30th and 34th minute, Abreu had two good chances but failed to widen Guoan's lead. In the 45th minute, controversy arose as referee Zhang Lei awarded Port a penalty as Li Lei seemingly fouled Metjan in Guoan's penalty area, but VAR review subsequently ruled out the penalty. After halftime in the 51st minute, a Hou Sen long ball allowed Abreu to set up Kang Sang-woo, who was brought down in Port's box. Guoan was awarded a penalty, and Abreu calmly put Guoan 2–0 up with a spot kick right down the center. In the 89th minute, Guoan conceded a Wu Lei header at short range, but the game ended with a 2–1 Guoan victory. Hou Sen, a Guoan veteran, played his 100th game for the club in the match.

In the last match in October, Guoan faced Chengdu Rongcheng on 29 October at home. The match, Guoan's final home game and the second to last league game of the season, could see Guoan into the AFC Champions League position if Guoan ended with a win. The game, however, did not go as planned as Guoan conceded in the 3rd minute. Although Abreu pulled one back in the 7th and Guoan playing with a man up from the 57th minute onward, it was Rongcheng who scored their second goal first in the 73rd minute. In the 4th minute of added time, Abreu fought his way through the penalty area and leveled the game for Guoan. However, Rongcheng scored another just 2 minutes later, handing Guoan a 2–3 home loss and quashing Guoan's dreams of Champions League participation. Wang Gang, who sustained an injury during the match and was substituted off in the 28th minute, was later confirmed to have suffered three broken ribs and would require extensive treatment.

=== November ===
On 2 November, it was reported that Abreu had had his contract automatically extended through the 2024 season by the team after scoring 8 goals.

Guoan's last game of the season came on 4 November against already-relegated Shenzhen. In the 18th minute, Guoan took the lead when Abreu got on the end of a Yu Dabao through-ball and swept the ball past the goal to Kang Sang-woo, who calmly put it into the net. In the 37th minute, Shenzhen players failed to clear the ball inside their own box, and Wang Ziming capitalized on the opportunity to put Guoan 2–0 ahead, scoring his 8th goal of the season of which 4 came against Shenzhen. In the 81st minute, the substitute Zhang Yuning tried a shot from beyond the box that deflected off the crossbar into the paths of Abreu, who scored his 12th goal of the season for Guoan. The game ended with a 3–0 victory for Guoan and saw the team finish the 2023 league campaign at 6th place, a 1 place improvement compared to the previous season.

On 5 November, veteran midfielder Piao Cheng announced his retirement from professional football at the end of the season. He joined Guoan in January 2011, capped 276 games for the team netting 18 goals and 23 assists.

== Players ==
=== First-team squad ===
As of 8 September 2023

Note: Flags indicate national team as defined under FIFA eligibility rules; some limited exceptions apply. Players may hold more than one non-FIFA nationality.

No.	Pos.	Nation	Player
1	GK	CHN	Han Jiaqi
4	DF	CHN	Li Lei
5	MF	BRA	Josef de Souza
6	MF	CHN	Chi Zhongguo
7	DF	KOR	Kang Sang-woo
8	MF	CHN	Piao Cheng
9	FW	CHN	Zhang Yuning
10	MF	CHN	Zhang Xizhe
14	GK	CHN	Zou Dehai
15	MF	CHN	Gao Tianyi
16	DF	CHN	Feng Boxuan
17	FW	CHN	Yang Liyu
18	FW	CHN	Fang Hao
19	MF	CHN	Nebijan Muhmet
20	FW	CHN	Wang Ziming
21	MF	CHN	Zhang Yuan

No.	Pos.	Nation	Player
22	DF	CHN	Yu Dabao (captain)
23	MF	CHN	Li Ke (Note: Upon joining Beijing Guoan, the player became a naturalized Chinese citizen)
26	DF	CHN	Bai Yang
27	DF	CHN	Wang Gang
28	MF	CHN	Zhang Chengdong
29	FW	ANG	Fábio Abreu
32	DF	CMR	Michael Ngadeu-Ngadjui
33	GK	CHN	Nureli Abbas
34	GK	CHN	Hou Sen
36	DF	CHN	Liang Shaowen
38	DF	CHN	Ruan Qilong
39	MF	CHN	Yan Yu
40	FW	CHN	Gao Jian
43	DF	CHN	Jiang Wenhao
44	FW	CHN	Duan Dezhi

==== Out on loan ====
As of 30 August 2023

Note: Flags indicate national team as defined under FIFA eligibility rules; some limited exceptions apply. Players may hold more than one non-FIFA nationality.

No.	Pos.	Nation	Player
—	FW	CRO	Marko Dabro (at Riga until 31 December 2023)
—	DF	CHN	Yang Fan (at Tianjin Jinmen Tiger until 31 December 2023)
—	GK	CHN	Guo Quanbo (at Meizhou Hakka until 31 December 2023)
—	FW	CHN	Cao Yongjing (at Changchun Yatai until 31 December 2023)
—	FW	CHN	Tian Yuda (at Changchun Yatai until 31 December 2023)
—	FW	CHN	Li Boxi (at Shijiazhuang Gongfu until 31 December 2023)

No.	Pos.	Nation	Player
—	GK	CHN	Ma Kunyue (at Zibo Qisheng until 31 December 2023)
—	GK	CHN	Ma Kunyue (at Zibo Qisheng until 31 December 2023)
—	MF	CHN	Shi Yucheng (at Suzhou Dongwu until 31 December 2023)
—	DF	CHN	He Xiaoqiang (at Qingdao West Coast until 31 December 2023)
—	MF	CHN	Ma Yujun (at Nanjing City until 31 December 2023)
—	FW	NGR	Samuel Adegbenro (at Viking until 31 December 2023)

== Transfers ==
=== In ===
#	Pos.	Player	Age	Moving from	Type	Transfer Window	Ends	Fee	Source
18	FW	(China) Fang Hao	22	(China) Shandong Taishan	Transfer	Winter	2027	Unspecified	
	DF	(China) Yang Fan	26	(China) Tianjin Jinmen Tiger	Return from loan	Winter		Unspecified	
5	MF	(Brazil) Josef de Souza	33	(Turkey) Beşiktaş	Transfer	Winter	2024	Free	
17	FW	(China) Yang Liyu	25	(China) Guangzhou	Transfer	Winter	2023	Unspecified	
4	DF	(China) Li Lei	30	(Switzerland) Grasshopper	Transfer	Winter	2027	Unspecified	
45	MF	(North Macedonia) Arijan Ademi	31	(Croatia) Dinamo Zagreb	Transfer	Winter	2025	¥780K (€100K)	
18	DF	(China) Feng Boxuan	25	(China) Henan Songshan Longmen	Transfer	Winter	2026	Unspecified	
32	DF	(Cameroon) Michael Ngadeu-Ngadjui	32	(Belgium) K.A.A. Gent	Transfer	Winter	2025	Free	
1	GK	(China) Han Jiaqi	23	(China) Guangzhou City	Transfer	Winter	2026	Free	
	FW	(China) Leng Jixuan	21	(China) Guangxi Pingguo Haliao	Return from loan	Winter		Free	
33	GK	(China) Nureli Abbas	18	(China) Hubei Istar	Transfer	Winter	2027	Unspecified	
29	FW	(Angola) Fábio Abreu	29	(United Arab Emirates) Khor Fakkan	Transfer	Summer	2024	Unspecified	
21	MF	(China) Zhang Yuan	25	(China) Shenzhen	Transfer	Summer		Free	
	FW	(China) Liu Guobo	23	(China) Zibo Qisheng	Return from loan	Summer		Free	

=== Out ===
#	Pos.	Player	Age	Moving to	Type	Transfer Window	Fee	Source
5	DF	(Bosnia and Herzegovina) Samir Memišević	29	(China) Hebei	End of loan	Winter	Free	
7	MF	(China) Hou Yongyong	24	(Norway) Ranheim	End of contract	Winter	Free	
30	FW	(Croatia) Marko Dabro	25	(Latvia) Riga	Loan	Winter	Undisclosed	
3	DF	(China) Yu Yang	33	(China) Tianjin Jinmen Tiger	End of contract	Winter	Free	
16	DF	(China) Jin Pengxiang	32	(China) Zibo Qisheng	End of contract	Winter	Free	
18	DF	(China) Jin Taiyan	33	(China) Yanbian Longding	End of contract	Winter	Free	
19	DF	(China) Liu Huan	33	(China) Nantong Zhiyun	End of contract	Winter	Free	
	DF	(China) Yang Fan	26	(China) Tianjin Jinmen Tiger	Loan	Winter	¥5M	
25	GK	(China) Guo Quanbo	25	(China) Meizhou Hakka	Loan	Winter	Undisclosed	
	FW	(China) Leng Jixuan	21	(China) Tianjin Jinmen Tiger	Transfer	Winter	Undisclosed	
37	FW	(China) Cao Yongjing	25	(China) Changchun Yatai	Loan	Winter	¥2M	
31	FW	(China) Li Boxi	22	(China) Shijiazhuang Gongfu	Loan	Winter	Undisclosed	
29	FW	(China) Tian Yuda	21	(China) Changchun Yatai	Loan	Winter	Undisclosed	
33	GK	(China) Ma Kunyue	21	(China) Zibo Qisheng	Loan	Winter	Undisclosed	
43	MF	(China) Shi Yucheng	21	(China) Suzhou Dongwu	Loan	Winter	Undisclosed	
32	FW	(China) Liu Guobo	23	(China) Zibo Qisheng	Loan	Winter	Undisclosed	
41	DF	(China) He Xiaoqiang	20	(China) Qingdao West Coast	Loan	Summer	Undisclosed	
42	MF	(China) Ma Yujun	19	(China) Nanjing City	Loan	Summer	Undisclosed	
	FW	(China) Liu Guobo	23	(China) Shandong Taishan	Transfer	Summer	Undisclosed	
11	FW	(Nigeria) Samuel Adegbenro	27	(Norway) Viking	Loan	Summer	Undisclosed	
45	MF	(North Macedonia) Arijan Ademi	31	(Croatia) Dinamo Zagreb	Transfer	Summer	¥2M (€250K)	

== Friendlies ==
25 February 2023 Friendly	Beijing Guoan	3–0	(China) Changchun Yatai	Haikou, China
	Piao Cheng; Jiang Wenhao; Adegbenro

1 March 2023 Friendly	Beijing Guoan	5–1	(China) Dalian Pro	Haikou, China
	Kang Sang-woo; Cao Yongjing; Xu Dongdong; Yan Yu		Yang Pengju

11 March 2023 Friendly	Beijing Guoan	1–2	(China) Tianjin Jinmen Tiger	Haikou, China
	Jiang Wenhao		Berić; Piao Taoyu

17 March 2023 Friendly	Beijing Guoan	3–0	(China) Shanghai Mitsubishi Heavy Industries Flying Lion	Haikou, China
	Tian Yuda; Li Boxi; Yang Liyu

23 March 2023 Friendly	Beijing Guoan	2–1	(China) Wuhan Three Towns	Haikou, China
	Kang Sang-woo; Yu Dabao

31 March 2023 Friendly	Beijing Guoan	1–1	(China) Tianjin Jinmen Tiger	Beijing, China
	Adegbenro		Andújar

7 April 2023 Friendly	Beijing Guoan	0–0	(China) Nantong Zhiyun	Wenzhou, China
				Stadium: Wenzhou Olympic Sports Center; Referee: Xu Qiangqiang

== Competitions ==
=== Overview ===
Competition	First match	Last match	Starting round	Final position	Record							
Competition	First match	Last match	Starting round	Final position	Pld	W	D	L	GF	GA	GD	Win %
Chinese Super League	15 April 2023	9 November 2023	Matchday 1	6th	30	14	9	7	53	35	+18	46.67
Chinese FA Cup	23 June 2023	31 August 2023	Third round	Quarter final	3	2	1	0	6	2	+4	66.67
Total					33	16	10	7	59	37	+22	48.48

Last updated: complete
Source: Soccerway

=== Chinese Super League ===
==== Results summary ====
Overall								Home						Away					
Pld	W	D	L	GF	GA	GD	Pts	W	D	L	GF	GA	GD	W	D	L	GF	GA	GD
30	14	9	7	53	35	+18	51	8	4	3	31	16	+15	6	5	4	22	19	+3

Last updated: complete.
Source: ESPN

==== Results by round ====
Round	1	2	3	4	5	6	7	8	9	10	11	12	13	14	15	16	17	18	19	20	21	22	23	24	25	26	27	28	29	30
Ground	H	A	A	H	A	H	H	A	H	A	H	A	H	A	H	A	H	H	A	H	A	A	H	A	H	A	H	A	H	A
Result	D	D	L	D	W	D	W	D	W	L	W	D	L	W	W	L	D	W	L	W	D	W	W	W	L	D	W	W	L	W
Position	6	8	13	13	7	8	7	7	7	7	6	7	7	7	6	6	6	6	7	6	6	6	4	4	6	6	5	5	6	6

Source: Competitive matches
A = Away; H = Home; W = Win; D = Draw; L = Loss

==== League table ====
Pos	Team	Pld	W	D	L	GF	GA	GD	Pts	Qualification or relegation
4	Chengdu Rongcheng	30	15	8	7	51	32	+19	53	
5	Shanghai Shenhua (Note: As Chinese FA Cup winners.)	30	15	7	8	34	31	+3	52	Qualification for AFC Champions League Elite League stage
6	Beijing Guoan	30	14	9	7	53	35	+18	51	
7	Wuhan Three Towns	30	14	9	7	51	35	+16	51	
8	Tianjin Jinmen Tiger	30	11	15	4	40	29	+11	48	

Source: Soccerway
Rules for classification:
- During season: 1) Points; 2) Goal difference; 3) Goals scored.
- After season: 1) Points; 2) Head-to-head points; 3) Head-to-head goal difference; 4) Head-to-head goals scored; 5) Scores of the weight ratio of the reserve league and youth leagues.
  Notes:

==== Matches ====
15 April 2023 1	Beijing Guoan	1–1	Meizhou Hakka	Beijing
20:05 UTC+8	Zhang Xizhe 54' (pen.); Li Lei (yellow card) 60'; Souza (yellow card) 87'	Report	Ye Chugui 19'; Yue Tze Nam (yellow card) 34'; Dugalić (yellow card) 53'; Chen Zhechao (yellow card) 58'; Yin Hongbo (yellow card) 64'; Shi Liang (yellow card) 76'	Stadium: Workers' Stadium; Attendance: 46,818; Referee: Ma Ning; Assistant referees: Shi Xiang; Wu Mingfeng; Fourth official: Huang Yi

20 April 2023 2	Wuhan Three Towns	1–1	Beijing Guoan	Wuhan
19:35 UTC+8	Denny Wang (yellow card) 49'; Wei Shihao (yellow card) 56'; Ademilson 90+2'; Xie Pengfei (yellow card) 90+5'	Report	Li Lei (yellow card) 40'; Yang Liyu 62'; Han Jiaqi (yellow card) 72'	Stadium: Wuhan Sports Center Stadium; Attendance: 23,747; Referee: Wang Di; Assistant referees: Zhou Fei; Zhang Cheng; Fourth official: Xu Qiangqiang

25 April 2023 3	Qingdao Hainiu	3–1	Beijing Guoan	Qingdao
19:35 UTC+8	Sarić 10' (pen.); Andrejević 26'; Kangwa 46'; Sha Yibo (yellow card) 69'	Report	Josef de Souza 50'; Wang Gang (yellow card) 33'	Stadium: Qingdao Youth Football Stadium; Attendance: 24,865; Referee: Zhen Wei; Assistant referees: Luo Zheng; He Long; Fourth official: Jia Zhiliang

29 April 2023 4	Beijing Guoan	0–0	Shandong Taishan	Beijing
19:35 UTC+8		Report	Li Hailong (yellow card) 59'	Stadium: Workers' Stadium; Attendance: 50,312; Referee: Tang Shunqi; Assistant referees: Ma Ji; Sun Kai; Fourth official: Hei Xiaohu

5 May 2023 5	Henan	0–1	Beijing Guoan	Zhengzhou
19:35 UTC+8	Wang Shangyuan (yellow card) 17'; Feng Boyuan (yellow card) 53'; Šunjić (yellow card) 87'	Report	Chi Zhongguo (yellow card) 49'; Yang Liyu 56'; Gao Tianyi (yellow card) 87'; Han Jiaqi (yellow card) 90+4'	Stadium: Zhengzhou Hanghai Stadium; Attendance: 19,573; Referee: Huang Yi; Assistant referees: Wang Dexin; Guan Changliang; Fourth official: Wan Tao

10 May 2023 6	Beijing Guoan	1–1	Tianjin Jinmen Tiger	Beijing
19:35 UTC+8	Kang Sang-woo (yellow card) 24'; Wang Ziming 81'; Wang Gang (yellow card) 89'	Report	Su Yuanjie (yellow card) 14'; Ming Tian (yellow card) 43' (yellow-red card) 63'; Ba Dun 68'	Stadium: Workers' Stadium; Attendance: 44,916; Referee: Li Haixin; Assistant referees: Guo Jingtao; Luo Zheng; Fourth official: Gan Shuran

15 May 2023 7	Beijing Guoan	1–0	Nantong Zhiyun	Beijing
19:35 UTC+8	Ademi 23'; Han Jiaqi (yellow card) 90+1'	Report	Xu Junmin (yellow card) 44'; Ming-yang Yang (yellow card) 75'	Stadium: Workers' Stadium; Attendance: 32,239; Referee: Memetjan Ahmat; Assistant referees: Ma Ji; Hu Chengjun; Fourth official: Zhen Wei

19 May 2023 8	Shanghai Shenhua	1–1	Beijing Guoan	Shanghai
19:35 UTC+8	Yu Hanchao 18'	Report	Zhang Chengdong (yellow card) 50'; Adegbenro 67'; Chi Zhongguo (yellow card) 81'	Stadium: Shanghai Stadium; Attendance: 28,875; Referee: Ma Ning; Assistant referees: Shi Xiang; Tang Rongdi; Fourth official: Liang Songshang

23 May 2023 9	Beijing Guoan	6–2	Cangzhou Mighty Lions	Beijing
19:35 UTC+8	Zhang Xizhe 16'; Ngadeu (yellow card) 24'; Wang Ziming 31', 52'; Kang Sang-woo 40'; Gao Tianyi 58'; Yang Liyu 63'	Report	Maritu 8'; Zhukov 25'; Piao Shihao (yellow card) 54'	Stadium: Workers' Stadium; Attendance: 32,966; Referee: Shen Yinhao; Assistant referees: Luo Zheng; Deng Bo; Fourth official: Xu Qiangqiang

28 May 2023 10	Zhejiang	3–2	Beijing Guoan	Huzhou
17:30 UTC+8	Ewolo 19'; Mushekwi 54'; Sun Zheng'ao 62'; Zhao Bo (yellow card) 85'; Zhang Jiaqi (yellow card) 90+10'	Report	Li Lei (yellow card) 5'; Kang Sang-woo 11'; Souza (yellow card) 34'; Bai Yang 51', (yellow card) 61'; Fang Hao (yellow card) 77'	Stadium: Huzhou Olympic Sports Center Stadium; Attendance: 8,912; Referee: Jin Jingyuan; Assistant referees: Guo Jingtao; Hu Chengjun; Fourth official: Kou Jianxun

2 June 2023 11	Beijing Guoan	4–3	Changchun Yatai	Beijing
19:35 UTC+8	Souza 29', 41'; Yang Liyu 66'; Kang Sang-woo 87'; Yu Dabao (yellow card) 90+6'	Report	Leonardo 22', 50'; Tan Long 65'; Žulj (yellow card) 75'; Wu Yake (yellow card) 90+4'	Stadium: Workers' Stadium; Attendance: 46,177; Referee: Wang Di; Assistant referees: Zhou Fei; Jin Jun; Fourth official: Wan Tao

9 June 2023 12	Dalian Pro	2–2	Beijing Guoan	Dalian
19:35 UTC+8	Manzoki 16', 45+1'; He Yupeng (yellow card) 59'; Lin Longchang (yellow card) 68'; Wu Yan (yellow card) 73'	Report	Feng Boxuan (yellow card) 57'; Zhang Chengdong (yellow card) 58'; Lin Longchang 77' (o.g.); Kang Sang-woo 86' (pen.)	Stadium: Dalian Sports Center Stadium; Attendance: 11,886; Referee: Xing Qi; Assistant referees: Luo Zheng; Li Xingfeng; Fourth official: Gan Shuran

29 June 2023 13	Beijing Guoan	1–2	Shanghai Port	Beijing
19:35 UTC+8	Fang Hao 81'	Report	Lü Wenjun 44'; Mirahmetjan Muzepper 65', (yellow card) 66'	Stadium: Workers' Stadium; Attendance: 46,309; Referee: Ma Ning; Assistant referees: Shi Xiang; Wang Xihong; Fourth official: Kou Jianxun

3 July 2023 14	Chengdu Rongcheng	0–1	Beijing Guoan	Chengdu
19:35 UTC+8		Report	Nebijan Muhmet 24'; Yu Dabao (yellow card) 47'; Ngadeu (yellow card) 56'; Han Jiaqi (yellow card) 62'; Souza (yellow card) 88'	Stadium: Chengdu Phoenix Hill Football Stadium; Attendance: 39,630; Referee: Liu Wei; Assistant referees: Sun Kai; Sun Jin; Fourth official: Hei Xiaohu

8 July 2023 15	Beijing Guoan	5–0	Shenzhen	Beijing
19:35 UTC+8	Piao Cheng 5'; Ademi (yellow card) 19'; Wang Ziming 45+3', 61', 85'; Chi Zhongguo (yellow card) 68'; Feng Boxuan 84'	Report	Du Yuezheng (yellow card) 33'; Li Ning (red card) 41'	Stadium: Workers' Stadium; Attendance: 45,724; Referee: Zhang Long; Assistant referees: Zhou Fei; Zhang Zhe; Fourth official: Shan Dan'ao

12 July 2023 16	Meizhou Hakka	3–1	Beijing Guoan	Wuhua
19:35 UTC+8	Conraad 19', 31'; Han Jiaqi 45+2' (o.g.); Rao Weihui (yellow card) 88'; Kosović (yellow card) 90'	Report	Ngadeu (yellow card) 81'; Wang Ziming 85'	Stadium: Huitang Stadium; Attendance: 17,589; Referee: Dai Yige; Assistant referees: Guo Jingtao; Xi Fei; Fourth official: Zhen Wei

16 July 2023 17	Beijing Guoan	1–1	Wuhan Three Towns	Beijing
19:35 UTC+8	Bai Yang (yellow card) 13'; Fang Hao 15'; Yu Dabao (yellow card) 28'; Ngadeu (yellow card) 35'	Report	He Chao (yellow card) 45+2'; Li Yang 81', (yellow card) 90+1'	Stadium: Workers' Stadium; Attendance: 46,943; Referee: Shen Yinhao; Assistant referees: Zhang Cheng; Su Xiaofei; Fourth official: Gao Peng

22 July 2023 18	Beijing Guoan	2–0	Qingdao Hainiu	Beijing
19:35 UTC+8	Ademi 51'; Gao Tianyi (yellow card) 56'; Kang Sang-woo 79'	Report	Ma Xingyu (yellow card) 39'; Peng Xinli (yellow card) 61'; Liu Junshuai (yellow card) 70'; Xu Dong (yellow card) 90+4'	Stadium: Workers' Stadium; Attendance: 42,049; Referee: Du Jianxin; Assistant referees: Sun Kai; Liu Xing; Fourth official: Zhang Long

30 July 2023 19	Shandong Taishan	3–0	Beijing Guoan	Jinan
19:35 UTC+8	Fellaini 59'; Li Yuanyi 73'; Fernandinho 90'	Report	Jiang Wenhao (yellow card) 25'; Ademi (yellow card) 44'; Bai Yang (yellow card) 44'	Stadium: Jinan Olympic Sports Center Stadium; Attendance: 45,889; Referee: Ma Ning; Assistant referees: Zhou Fei; Guan Changliang; Fourth official: Wang Jing

4 August 2023 20	Beijing Guoan	3–1	Henan	Beijing
19:35 UTC+8	Kang Sang-woo 8'; Souza 42'; Gao Tianyi (yellow card) 58'; Feng Boxuan (yellow card) 66'; Ngadeu (yellow card) 79'; Chi Zhongguo 84'; Fang Hao (yellow card) 87'	Report	Čović 4', (yellow card) 5'; Denić (yellow card) 59'; Yang Shuai (yellow card) 61'; Hildeberto (yellow card) 86'; Ke Zhao (yellow card) 90+1'	Stadium: Workers' Stadium; Attendance: 40,201; Referee: Dai Yige; Assistant referees: Guo Jingtao; Wu Mingfeng; Fourth official: Xu Qiangqiang

9 August 2023 21	Tianjin Jinmen Tiger	0–0	Beijing Guoan	Tianjin
19:35 UTC+8	Yang Fan (yellow card) 17'	Report	Wang Gang (yellow card) 6'; Feng Boxuan (yellow card) 14'; Souza (yellow card) 82'	Stadium: TEDA Football Stadium; Attendance: 28,550; Referee: Jin Jingyuan; Assistant referees: Ma Ji; Tang Rongdi; Fourth official: Liu Xinyu

13 August 2023 22	Nantong Zhiyun	0–1	Beijing Guoan	Nantong
19:35 UTC+8	Wei Lai (yellow card) 56'	Report	Yang Liyu (yellow card) 43'; Ngadeu-Ngadjui 60'; Kang Sang-woo (yellow card) 90+1'; Fang Hao (yellow card) 90+4'	Stadium: Rugao Olympic Sports Center Stadium; Attendance: 19,993; Referee: Du Jianxin; Assistant referees: Liu Xing; Zhang Chao; Fourth official: Zhen Wei

19 August 2023 23	Beijing Guoan	2–1	Shanghai Shenhua	Beijing
19:35 UTC+8	Abreu 28', 37'; Hou Sen (red card) 60'; Han Jiaqi (yellow card) 85'	Report	Bassogog 14'; Jiang Shenglong (yellow card) 40'; Cui Lin (yellow card) 55'; Amadou (yellow card) 90+3'	Stadium: Workers' Stadium; Attendance: 52,500; Referee: Memetjan Ahmat; Assistant referees: Shi Xiang; Guan Changliang; Fourth official: Hei Xiaohu

26 August 2023 24	Cangzhou Mighty Lions	1–5	Beijing Guoan	Cangzhou
19:35 UTC+8	Owusu-Sekyere (yellow card) 3', (goal) 85'; Wang Peng (yellow card) 36'; Zheng Kaimu (yellow card) 45+1'	Report	Liu Yang 17' (o.g.); Wang Ziming (yellow card) 13'; Zhang Xizhe 17'; Abreu 43', 47', (yellow card) 45+1'; Kang Sang-woo 53'; Wang Gang (yellow card) 59'; Gao Tianyi (yellow card) 90+3'	Stadium: Cangzhou Stadium; Referee: Wang Jing; Assistant referees: Guo Jingtao; Wu Mingfeng; Fourth official: Liang Songshang

15 September 2023 25	Beijing Guoan	0–1	Zhejiang	Beijing
19:35 UTC+8	Li Ke (yellow card) 13'; Zhang Chengdong (yellow card) 83'; Zhang Xizhe (yellow card) 90+4'	Report	Li Tixiang (yellow card) 18'; Qian Jiegei (yellow card) 20'; Leonardo 57'; Dong Yu (yellow card) 71'; Leung Nok Hang (yellow card) 90'; Andrijašević (yellow card) 90+4'	Stadium: Workers' Stadium; Attendance: 40,500; Referee: Huang Yi; Assistant referees: Wang Dexin; Tang Rongdi; Fourth official: Yu Bo

22 September 2023 26	Changchun Yatai	1–1	Beijing Guoan	Changchun
19:35 UTC+8	Zhang Yufeng (yellow card) 12'; Yi Teng (yellow card) 17'; Žulj 34'; Yuan Mincheng (yellow card) 90+2'	Report	Abreu 13' (yellow card) 90'; Wang Gang (yellow card) 47'; Nebijan Muhmet (yellow card) 90+9'	Stadium: Changchun Stadium; Attendance: 27,892; Referee: Du Jianxin; Assistant referees: Zhou Fei; Jin Jun; Fourth official: Hei Xiaohu

30 September 2023 27	Beijing Guoan	2–0	Dalian Pro	Beijing
17:30 UTC+8	Yang Liyu (yellow card) 35', (goal) 69'; Abreu 73'; Li Ke (yellow card) 90+2'	Report	Zhu Ting (yellow card) 8'; Wang Yaopeng (yellow card) 45+2'; Lü Peng (yellow card) 53'; Wang Xianjun (yellow card) 75'	Stadium: Workers' Stadium; Attendance: 41,148; Referee: Memetjan Ahmat; Assistant referees: Cao Yi; Xi Fei; Fourth official: Shan Dan'ao

20 October 2023 28	Shanghai Port	1–2	Beijing Guoan	Shanghai
19:35 UTC+8	Li Ang (yellow card) 78'; Metjan (yellow card) 84'; Wu Lei 89'	Report	Wang Gang 24'; Ngadeu-Ngadjui (yellow card) 36'; Yu Dabao (yellow card) 36'; Chi Zhongguo (yellow card) 45+5'; Abreu 54' (pen.); Li Ke (yellow card) 84'; Kang Sang-woo (yellow card) 90+6'	Stadium: Pudong Football Stadium; Attendance: 17,579; Referee: Zhang Lei; Assistant referees: Ma Ji; Luo Zheng; Fourth official: Liu Xinyu

29 October 2023 29	Beijing Guoan	2–3	Chengdu Rongcheng	Beijing
15:30 UTC+8	Abreu 7' (pen.), 90+4'; Gao Tianyi (yellow card) 66'; Ngadeu (yellow card) 84'; Li Ke (yellow card) 90+1'	Report	Felipe 3', 73'; Tang Miao (yellow card) 31'; Hu Ruibao (yellow card) 49'; Gan Chao (red card) 57'; Palacios 90+6', (yellow card) 90+8'	Stadium: Workers' Stadium; Attendance: 47,729; Referee: Ma Ning; Assistant referees: Wang Dexin; Guan Changliang; Fourth official: Yu Bo

4 November 2023 30	Shenzhen	0–2	Beijing Guoan	Shenzhen
15:30 UTC+8	Tian Ziyi (yellow card) 79'	Report	Kang Sang-woo 18'; Wang Ziming 37'; Duan Dezhi (yellow card) 77'; Abreu 81'	Stadium: Shenzhen Universiade Sports Center; Attendance: 9,011; Referee: Shen Yinhao; Assistant referees: Jin Jun; Zhang Zhe; Fourth official: Wan Tao

=== Chinese FA Cup ===
Guoan joined the FA Cup in the third round on 23 June. All rounds are single-elimination games.

23 June 2023 Third round	Zibo Qisheng	0–1	Beijing Guoan	Zibo
17:00 UTC+8	Wang Yuchen (yellow card) 8'; Xu Zihao (yellow card) 23'; Hou Jinjiang (yellow card) 79'	Report	Yang Liyu 8'; Jiang Wenhao (yellow card) 71'	Stadium: Zibo Sports Center Stadium; Attendance: 0 Referee: Zhang Long; Assistant referees: Sun Jin; Zhang Chao; Fourth official: Mu Yuchen

26 July 2023 Fourth round	Qingdao West Coast	1–4	Beijing Guoan	Qingdao
19:35 UTC+8	Han Xuan (yellow card) 45'; Shi Jian 52'; Li Kai (yellow card) 84'; Zhang Xiuwei (yellow card) 86'	Report	Feng Boxuan (yellow card) 17'; Abreu 18', 49'; Nebijan Muhmet 38'; Fang Hao 73'; Zhang Chengdong (yellow card) 76'	Stadium: Guzhenkou University City Sports Center; Attendance: 7,966; Referee: Ma Yunkun; Assistant referees: Wang Dexin; Jiang Bo; Fourth official: Wang Jing

31 August 2023 Quarter-finals	Beijing Guoan	1–1 (a.e.t.) (4–5 p)	Shandong Taishan	Beijing
19:35 UTC+8	Kang Sang-woo 19'; Fábio Abreu (yellow card) 73'; Gao Tianyi (yellow card) 118'; Li Lei (yellow card) 120'		Li Yuanyi 10', (yellow card) 99'; Zheng Zheng (yellow card) 53'; Shi Ke (yellow card) 59'; Liao Lisheng (yellow card) 83'; Fei Nanduo (yellow card) 108'; Moisés (yellow card) 115'; Crysan (yellow card) 117'	Stadium: Workers' Stadium; Attendance: 50,569; Referee: Ma Ning; Assistant referees: Zhang Cheng; Zhou Fei; Fourth official: Xu Qiangqiang
	Penalties
	Ngadeu (penalty scored); Zhang Chengdong (penalty scored); Wang Ziming (penalty scored); Gao Tianyi (penalty scored); Kang Sang-woo (penalty missed)		(penalty scored) Crysan; (penalty scored) Moisés; (penalty scored) Pato; (penalty scored) Fei Nanduo; (penalty scored) Fellaini

== Statistics ==
=== Appearances and goals ===
As of the end of the 2023 season

No.	Pos.	Nat.	Name	Chinese Super League		Chinese FA Cup		Total	
No.	Pos.	Nat.	Name	Apps	Goals	Apps	Goals	Apps	Goals
1	GK	(China)	Han Jiaqi	18(1)	0	0	0	18(1)	0
4	DF	(China)	Li Lei	18(3)	0	1	0	19(3)	0
5	MF	(Brazil)	Josef de Souza	18(2)	4	0	0	18(2)	4
6	MF	(China)	Chi Zhongguo	16(9)	1	2	0	18(9)	1
7	MF	(South Korea)	Kang Sang-woo	21(5)	8	1	1	22(5)	9
8	MF	(China)	Piao Cheng	3(4)	1	1	0	4(4)	1
9	FW	(China)	Zhang Yuning	1(5)	0	0	0	1(5)	0
10	MF	(China)	Zhang Xizhe	12(6)	3	2	0	14(6)	3
11	FW	(Nigeria)	Samuel Adegbenro	7(5)	1	0	0	7(5)	1
14	GK	(China)	Zou Dehai	1	0	0	0	1	0
15	MF	(China)	Gao Tianyi	13(11)	1	0(2)	0	14(13)	1
16	DF	(China)	Feng Boxuan	12(3)	1	2	0	14(3)	1
17	FW	(China)	Yang Liyu	22(2)	5	2	1	24(2)	6
18	FW	(China)	Fang Hao	3(15)	2	1(1)	1	4(16)	3
19	DF	(China)	Nebijan Muhmet	6(5)	1	2	1	8(5)	2
20	FW	(China)	Wang Ziming	13(11)	8	0(2)	0	13(13)	8
21	MF	(China)	Zhang Yuan	0(2)	0	0(1)	0	0(3)	0
22	DF	(China)	Yu Dabao	9(9)	0	2	0	11(9)	0
23	MF	(China)	Li Ke	14(5)	0	2(1)	0	16(6)	0
26	DF	(China)	Bai Yang	17(2)	1	1	0	18(2)	1
27	DF	(China)	Wang Gang	20(1)	1	1	0	21(1)	1
28	DF	(China)	Zhang Chengdong	13(7)	0	3	0	16(7)	0
29	FW	(Angola)	Fábio Abreu	11(2)	10	2	2	13(2)	12
32	DF	(Cameroon)	Michael Ngadeu-Ngadjui	29	1	2	0	31	1
33	GK	(China)	Nureli Abbas	0	0	0	0	0	0
34	GK	(China)	Hou Sen	11	0	3	0	14	0
35	MF	(China)	Chen Yanpu	0	0	0	0	0	0
36	DF	(China)	Liang Shaowen	0	0	0	0	0	0
38	DF	(China)	Ruan Qilong	0	0	0	0	0	0
39	MF	(China)	Yan Yu	0(7)	0	0(1)	0	0(8)	0
40	FW	(China)	Gao Jian	0	0	0	0	0	0
41	DF	(China)	He Xiaoqiang	0	0	0	0	0	0
42	MF	(China)	Ma Yujun	0	0	0	0	0	0
43	DF	(China)	Jiang Wenhao	6(4)	0	1	0	7(4)	0
44	FW	(China)	Duan Dezhi	0(3)	0	0	0	0(3)	0
45	MF	(North Macedonia)	Arijan Ademi	15(4)	2	0(1)	0	15(5)	2

=== Goals ===
As of the end of the 2023 season

Rank	Position	Name	Chinese Super League	Chinese FA Cup	Total
1	FW	(Angola) Fábio Abreu	10	2	12
2	DF	(South Korea) Kang Sang-woo	8	1	9
3	FW	(China) Wang Ziming	8	0	8
4	FW	(China) Yang Liyu	5	1	6
5	MF	(Brazil) Josef de Souza	4	0	4
6	FW	(China) Fang Hao	2	1	3
6	MF	(China) Zhang Xizhe	3	0	3
7	MF	(North Macedonia) Arijan Ademi	2	0	2
7	DF	(China) Nebijan Muhmet	1	1	2
8	FW	(Nigeria) Samuel Adegbenro	1	0	1
8	MF	(China) Gao Tianyi	1	0	1
8	DF	(China) Bai Yang	1	0	1
8	DF	(China) Feng Boxuan	1	0	1
8	MF	(China) Piao Cheng	1	0	1
8	MF	(China) Chi Zhongguo	1	0	1
8	DF	(Cameroon) Michael Ngadeu-Ngadjui	1	0	1
8	DF	(China) Wang Gang	1	0	1
8	Own goal by opposition		2	0	1
Total			53	6	59

=== Assists ===
As of the end of the 2023 season

Rank	Position	Name	Chinese Super League	Chinese FA Cup	Total
1	MF	(China) Gao Tianyi	4	1	5
1	DF	(South Korea) Kang Sang-woo	5	0	5
2	MF	(China) Zhang Xizhe	3	1	4
2	FW	(Angola) Fábio Abreu	4	0	4
3	DF	(China) Wang Gang	3	0	3
3	DF	(China) Yu Dabao	2	1	3
4	MF	(North Macedonia) Arijan Ademi	2	0	2
4	MF	(Brazil) Josef de Souza	2	0	2
5	DF	(Cameroon) Michael Ngadeu-Ngadjui	1	0	1
5	DF	(China) Feng Boxuan	1	0	1
5	MF	(China) Li Ke	1	0	1
5	FW	(China) Nebijan Muhmet	1	0	1
5	FW	(China) Fang Hao	1	0	1
5	FW	(China) Duan Dezhi	1	0	1
5	MF	(China) Chi Zhongguo	1	0	1
5	FW	(China) Yang Liyu	1	0	1
Total			33	3	36

=== Clean sheets ===
As of the end of the 2023 season

Rank	Name	Chinese Super League	Chinese FA Cup	Total
1	(China) Hou Sen	5	1	6
2	(China) Han Jiaqi	5	0	5
Total		10	1	11

Numbers in parentheses represent games where both goalkeepers participated and both kept a clean sheet; the number in parentheses is awarded to the goalkeeper who was substituted on, whilst a full clean sheet is awarded to the goalkeeper who was on the field at the start of play.

=== Disciplinary record ===
N	P	Nat.	Name	Chinese Super League			Chinese FA Cup			Total			Notes
N	P	Nat.	Name	Yellow card	Second yellow card	Red card	Yellow card	Second yellow card	Red card	Yellow card	Second yellow card	Red card	Notes
4	DF	(China)	Li Lei	3			1			4			
5	MF	(Brazil)	Josef de Souza	4						4			
1	GK	(China)	Han Jiaqi	5						5			
27	DF	(China)	Wang Gang	5						5			
6	MF	(China)	Chi Zhongguo	4						4			
15	MF	(China)	Gao Tianyi	5			1			6			
7	DF	(South Korea)	Kang Sang-woo	3						3			
28	DF	(China)	Zhang Chengdong	3			1			4			
32	DF	(Cameroon)	Michael Ngadeu-Ngadjui	7						7			
26	DF	(China)	Bai Yang	3						3			
18	DF	(China)	Fang Hao	3						3			
22	DF	(China)	Yu Dabao	4						4			
16	DF	(China)	Feng Boxuan	3			1			4			
45	MF	(North Macedonia)	Arijan Ademi	2						2			
35	DF	(China)	Jiang Wenhao	1			1			2			
7	FW	(China)	Yang Liyu	2						2			
34	GK	(China)	Hou Sen			1						1	
20	FW	(China)	Wang Ziming	1						1			
29	FW	(Portugal)	Fábio Abreu	2			1			3			
23	MF	(China)	Li Ke	4						4			
10	MF	(China)	Zhang Xizhe	1						1			
19	DF	(China)	Nebijan Muhmet	1						1			
44	FW	(China)	Duan Dezhi	1						1			

Last updated: End of 2023 season
Only competitive matches
(yellow card) = Number of bookings; (second yellow card) = Number of sending offs after a second yellow card; (red card) = Number of sending offs by a direct red card.

== Awards and nominations ==
=== Matchday awards ===
==== Chinese Super League Player of the Matchday ====
Matchday	Pos.	Player	Result	Ref.
4	DF	(Cameroon) Michael Ngadeu-Ngadjui	Nominated	
5	GK	(China) Han Jiaqi	Nominated	
9	FW	(China) Wang Ziming	Nominated	
11	DF	(South Korea) Kang Sang-woo	Nominated	
14	FW	(China) Nebijan Muhmet	Won	
15	FW	(China) Wang Ziming	Won	
20	DF	(South Korea) Kang Sang-woo	Nominated	
22	DF	(Cameroon) Michael Ngadeu-Ngadjui	Nominated	
23	FW	(Angola) Fábio Abreu	Won	
24	FW	(Angola) Fábio Abreu	Nominated	
27	FW	(China) Yang Liyu	Nominated	

=== Monthly awards ===
==== Guoan Player of the Month ====
The winners of the award were chosen by club-organized fan and media vote with fan votes weighing 70% and media votes weighing the remaining 30%.

Month	Pos.	Player	Pld	G	A	CS	Votes	Ref.
April and May	GK	(China) Han Jiaqi	9	0	0	3	28% fans, 30% media	
June	DF	(South Korea) Kang Sang-woo	3	2	0	0		
July	FW	(China) Fang Hao	7	2	0	–	(Note: Fang Hao had the highest number of fan votes due to interference by Shandong fans in the voting system, and Nabijan had the highest number of media votes. The club gave the award to both players jointly, and the players dedicated the award to the fans)	
July	FW	(China) Nabijan Muhmet	7	2	1	–	(Note: Fang Hao had the highest number of fan votes due to interference by Shandong fans in the voting system, and Nabijan had the highest number of media votes. The club gave the award to both players jointly, and the players dedicated the award to the fans)	
August	FW	(Angola) Fábio Abreu	6	4	2	–	26% fans, 50% media	

==== Chinese Super League Player of the Month ====
Month	Pos.	Player	Result	Ref.
July	FW	(China) Wang Ziming	Nominated	
August	FW	(Angola) Fábio Abreu	Won	

==== Chinese Super League Team of the Month ====
Month	Pos.	Player	Pld	G	A	CS	S	Ref.
April	DF	(Cameroon) Michael Ngadeu-Ngadjui	4	0	0	1	–	
May	GK	(China) Han Jiaqi	6	–	–	2	19	
June	DF	(South Korea) Kang Sang-woo	3	2	0	0	–	
August	DF	(South Korea) Kang Sang-woo	5	2	1	2	–	
August	FW	(Angola) Fábio Abreu	5	4	2	–	–	
October and November	FW	(Angola) Fábio Abreu	3	4	1	–	–	
October and November	DF	(China) Zhang Chengdong	3	0	0	1	–	

==== Chinese Super League Goalkeeper of the Month ====
Month	Player	Result	Ref.
May	(China) Han Jiaqi	Won	

==== Chinese Super League Manager of the Month ====
Month	Manager	M	W	D	L	GF	GA	GD	Pts	Pos	Result	Ref.
August	(Portugal) Ricardo Soares	5	4	1	0	11	3	+8	13	4th	Won	

=== Seasonal awards ===
==== Chinese Super League ====
Award	Manager or Player	Result	Notes	Ref.
2023 Team of the Season	(Cameroon) Michael Ngadeu-Ngadjui	Won		
