= Nureli Abbas =

Chinese footballer (born 2004)

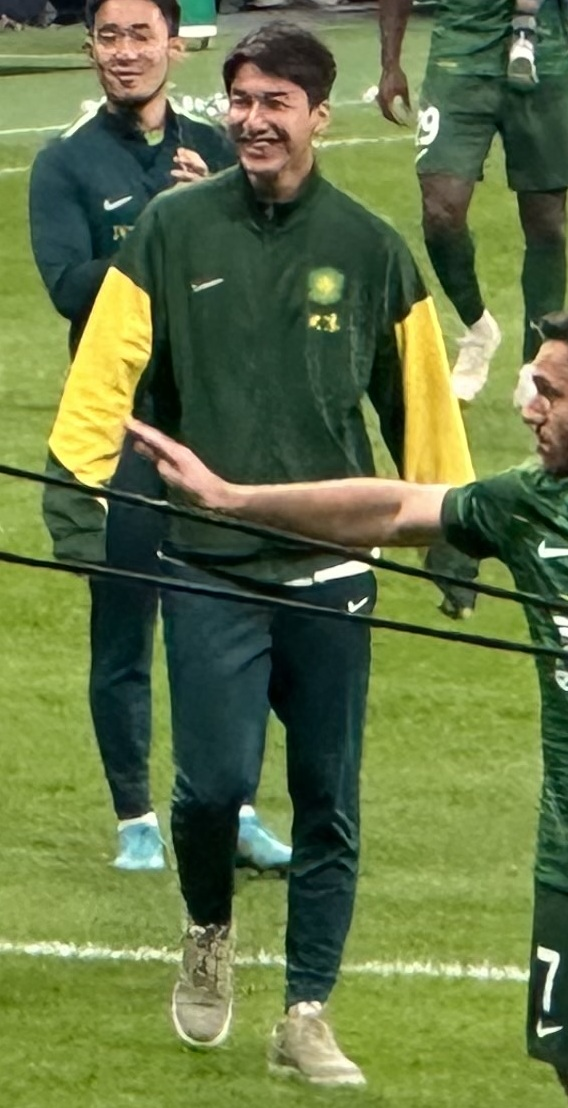
- Nureli in May 2025

Personal information
- Full name: Nureli Abbas
- Date of birth: 26 September 2004 (age 22)
- Place of birth: Shanshan County, Xinjiang, China
- Height: 1.93 m (6 ft 4 in)
- Position: Goalkeeper

Team information
- Current team: Beijing Guoan
- Number: 33

Youth career
- –2021: Xinjiang FA

Senior career*
Years	Team	Apps	(Gls)
2021	Xinjiang Snowland Tiancheng	0	(0)
2022	Hubei Istar	11	(0)
2023–	Beijing Guoan	0	(0)
- * Club domestic league appearances and goals as of 22 November 2025

Nureli Abbas (simplified Chinese: 努尔艾力·阿巴斯; traditional Chinese: 努爾艾力·阿巴斯; pinyin: Nǔ'ěr'àilì Ābāsī; born 26 September 2004) is a Chinese professional footballer who plays as a goalkeeper for Chinese Super League club Beijing Guoan.

== Club career ==
=== Early career ===
Born in Shanshan County, Xinjiang, Nureli started his career with the Xinjiang Football Association, before completing a senior move to Chinese Champions League side Xinjiang Snowland Tiancheng. He was left as an unused substitute throughout all three of the club's matches in the 2021 Chinese Champions League. In 2022, Nureli moved to China League Two club Hubei Istar. On 2 July 2022, Nureli made his professional debut in a 2–1 victory over Zibo Qisheng. On 31 October 2022, he was noted by Hubei Istar for his stand-out performance in the 3–0 win against Hubei companion Wuhan Jiangcheng. In the 2022 China League Two season, he made a total of 11 appearances.

=== Beijing Guoan ===
On 6 April 2023, Nureli joined Chinese Super League outfit Beijing Guoan on a free transfer.

On 18 September 2025, he made his Beijing Guoan debut, starting in a 2–2 home AFC Champions League Two draw against Vietnamese side Cong An Hanoi. On 2 October, he made his second appearance for Beijing Guoan in a 3–0 away defeat to Australian club Macarthur FC.

== International career ==
In August 2024, he was called up to the China U21 for a three-week training camp led by Antonio Puche.

== Personal life ==
In April 2024, Nureli cited Cristiano Ronaldo as his favourite footballer.

== Career statistics ==
As of 2 October 2025

Appearances and goals by club, season, and competition
Club	Season	League			Cup		Continental		Other		Total	
Club	Season	Division	Apps	Goals	Apps	Goals	Apps	Goals	Apps	Goals	Apps	Goals
Xinjiang Snowland Tiancheng	2021	CMCL	0	0	–		–		–		0	0
Hubei Istar	2022	China League Two	11	0	–		–		–		11	0
Beijing Guoan	2023	Chinese Super League	0	0	0	0	–		–		0	0
Beijing Guoan	2024	Chinese Super League	0	0	0	0	–		–		0	0
Beijing Guoan	2025	Chinese Super League	0	0	0	0	2 (Note: Appearances in AFC Champions League Two)	0	–		2	0
Beijing Guoan	Total		0	0	0	0	2	0	0	0	2	0
Career total			11	0	0	0	2	0	0	0	13	0

== Honours ==
Beijing Guoan

- Chinese FA Cup: 2025
- Chinese FA Super Cup: 2026
