= Fang Hao =

Chinese association football player

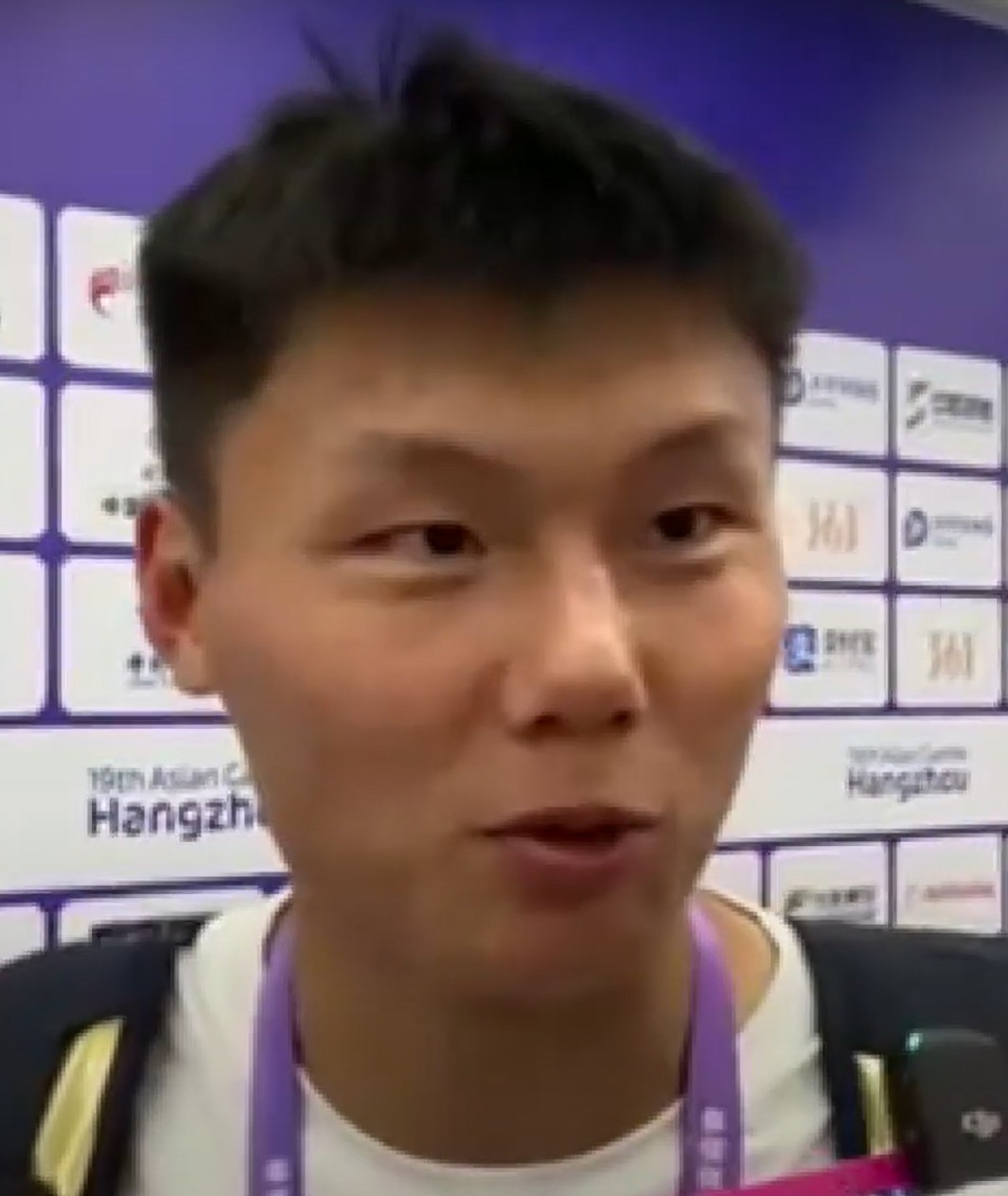
- Fang Hao in September 2023

Personal information
- Date of birth: 3 January 2000 (age 26)
- Place of birth: Yangzhong, Jiangsu, China
- Height: 1.77 m (5 ft 10 in)
- Position: Forward

Team information
- Current team: Zhejiang FC
- Number: 18

Youth career
- –2019: Shandong Taishan
- 2018: → Desportivo Brasil (youth loan)

Senior career*
| Years | Team | Apps | (Gls) |
| 2019–2022 | Shandong Taishan | 3 | (0) |
| 2019–2020 | → Desportivo Brasil (loan) | 3 | (0) |
| 2020 | → Inner Mongolia Zhongyou (loan) | 12 | (2) |
| 2021 | → Wuhan FC (loan) | 18 | (0) |
| 2023–2025 | Beijing Guoan | 52 | (7) |
| 2026– | Zhejiang FC | 16 | (1) |

International career^{‡}
| 2022–2023 | China U23 | 9 | (1) |
| 2022– | China | 6 | (0) |
Medal record
Representing China
Men's football
EAFF Championship
| Bronze medal – third place | 2022 Japan | Team |
- * Club domestic league appearances and goals as of 19 November 2026 ‡ National team caps and goals as of 11 June 2024

Fang Hao (Chinese: 方昊; born 3 January 2000) is a Chinese professional footballer who plays as a forward for Chinese Super League club Zhejiang FC and the China national team.

== Club career ==
Coming through Shandong Taishan's youth academy, Fang joined China League One club Inner Mongolia Zhongyou for the 2020 season and then Chinese Super League club Wuhan FC for the 2021 season on loan respectively. He made his debut for Taishan on 3 June 2022 in a 1-0 win over Zhejiang FC, coming on as an 81st-minute substitute but had to come off less than 10 minutes later as captain Zheng Zheng was sent off and the team needed to bring on another defender.

=== Beijing Guoan ===
On 30 March 2023, Fang joined fellow Chinese Super League club Beijing Guoan. On 15 April 2024, Fang made his debut for Guoan in a 1-1 home draw against Meizhou Hakka. On 29 June 2023, Fang scored his first Chinese Super League goal as well as first goal for Guoan in a 2-1 home defeat against Shanghai Port.

=== Zhejiang ===
On 20 January 2026, Fang joined Chinese Super League side Zhejiang FC, taking the number 18 shirt.

== International career ==
On 26 March 2022, Fang drew widespread attention after scoring 4 goals in a 4-2 victory over Thailand U23 in the 2022 Dubai Cup. On 20 July 2022, Fang made his international debut in a 3-0 defeat against South Korea in the 2022 EAFF E-1 Football Championship, as the Chinese FA decided to field the U-23 national team for this senior competition.

== Career statistics ==
=== Club ===
As of 2 November 2024.

| Club | Season | League | | | Cup | | Other | | Total | |
| Club | Season | Division | Apps | Goals | Apps | Goals | Apps | Goals | Apps | Goals |
|---|---|---|---|---|---|---|---|---|---|---|
| Shandong Taishan | 2022 | Chinese Super League | 3 | 0 | 0 | 0 | 0 | 0 | 3 | 0 |
| Shandong Taishan | Total | | 3 | 0 | 0 | 0 | 0 | 0 | 3 | 0 |
| Desportivo Brasil (loan) | 2019 | – | | | 0 | 0 | 4 (Note: Appearances in the Copa Paulista) | 0 | 4 | 0 |
| Desportivo Brasil (loan) | 2020 | – | | | 0 | 0 | 3 (Note: Appearances in the Campeonato Paulista A3) | 0 | 3 | 0 |
| Desportivo Brasil (loan) | Total | | 0 | 0 | 0 | 0 | 7 | 0 | 7 | 0 |
| Inner Mongolia Zhongyou (loan) | 2020 | China League One | 12 | 2 | 0 | 0 | - | | 12 | 2 |
| Wuhan FC (loan) | 2021 | Chinese Super League | 18 | 0 | 2 | 1 | - | | 20 | 1 |
| Beijing Guoan | 2023 | Chinese Super League | 18 | 2 | 2 | 1 | - | | 20 | 3 |
| Beijing Guoan | 2024 | Chinese Super League | 21 | 3 | 2 | 0 | - | | 23 | 3 |
| Beijing Guoan | Total | | 39 | 5 | 4 | 1 | 0 | 0 | 43 | 6 |
| Career total | | | 72 | 7 | 6 | 2 | 7 | 0 | 85 | 9 |

== Honours ==
Beijing Guoan

- Chinese FA Cup: 2025
