= Han Jiaqi =

Chinese association football player

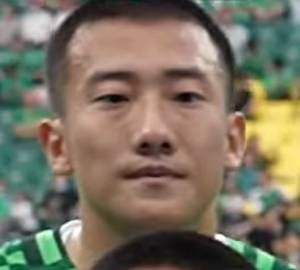
- Han Jiaqi in June 2023

Personal information
- Date of birth: 3 July 1999 (age 27)
- Place of birth: Beijing, China
- Height: 1.85 m (6 ft 1 in)
- Position: Goalkeeper

Team information
- Current team: Beijing Guoan
- Number: 22

Youth career
- –2019: Aves

Senior career*
Years	Team	Apps	(Gls)
2019–2022	Guangzhou City	65	(0)
2023–	Beijing Guoan	41	(0)

International career^{‡}
2019–2023	China U23	9	(0)
2022	China	3	(0)
Medal record
Representing China
Men's football
EAFF Championship
Bronze medal – third place	2022 Japan	Team
- * Club domestic league appearances and goals as of 19 November 2026 ‡ National team caps and goals as of 27 July 2022

Han Jiaqi (Chinese: 韩佳奇; born 3 July 1999) is a Chinese professional footballer who plays as a goalkeeper for Chinese Super League club Beijing Guoan.

== Club career ==
=== Guangzhou R&F ===
Han Jiaqi made his professional debut for Guangzhou R&F in a league game on 21 April 2019 against Jiangsu Suning in a match that ended in a 5–1 defeat. After only making three appearances throughout the season, within the following campaign at the age of 21 years old, Han replaced the experienced Cheng Yuelei as the club's first choice keeper for the 2020 Chinese Super League season. After keeping his first clean sheet in the Chinese Super League on 16 August 2020 in a 1–0 win against Dalian Professional, he became a vital member within the team and became the only CSL player to play every minute of the 2020 season.

=== Beijing Guoan ===
On 30 March 2023, Han joined Chinese Super League club Beijing Guoan, following the disbandment of Guangzhou City. On 20 April 2024, he made his debut for Guoan in a 1–1 away draw against Wuhan Three Towns.

== International career ==
On 20 July 2022, Han made his international debut in a 3–0 defeat against South Korea in the 2022 EAFF E-1 Football Championship, as the Chinese FA decided to field the U-23 national team for this senior competition. On 24 July 2022, Han kept his first clean sheet for the national team in a 0–0 draw against Japan.

== Career statistics ==
=== Club ===
As of 19 November 2026.

Appearances and goals by club, season and competition
Club	Season	League			National Cup		Continental		Other		Total	
Club	Season	Division	Apps	Goals	Apps	Goals	Apps	Goals	Apps	Goals	Apps	Goals
Guangzhou City	2019	Chinese Super League	2	0	1	0	–		–		3	0
Guangzhou City	2020	Chinese Super League	20	0	3	0	–		–		23	0
Guangzhou City	2021	Chinese Super League	21	0	1	0	–		–		22	0
Guangzhou City	2022	Chinese Super League	22	0	0	0	–		–		22	0
Guangzhou City	Total		65	0	5	0	0	0	0	0	70	0
Beijing Guoan	2023	Chinese Super League	19	0	0	0	–		–		19	0
Beijing Guoan	2024	Chinese Super League	15	0	3	0	–		–		18	0
Beijing Guoan	2025	Chinese Super League	6	0	0	0	–		–		6	0
Beijing Guoan	2026	Chinese Super League	1	0	0	0	–		–		1	0
Beijing Guoan	Total		41	0	3	0	0	0	0	0	44	0
Career total			106	0	8	0	0	0	0	0	114	0

=== International ===
As of 2 November 2024

Appearances and goals by national team and year
National team	Year	Apps	Goals
China	2022	3	0
Total		3	0

== Honours ==
Beijing Guoan

- Chinese FA Cup: 2025
