= Yan Yu (footballer) =

Chinese footballer (born 2002)

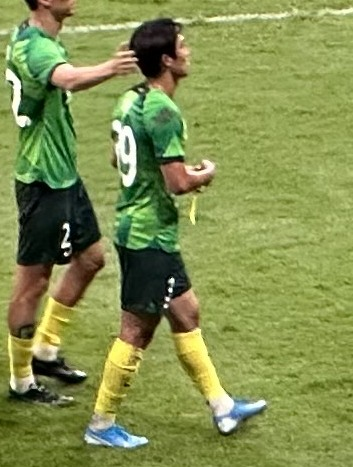
- Yan Yu in July 2023

Personal information
- Full name: Yan Yu
- Date of birth: 3 November 2002 (age 24)
- Place of birth: Wuyi County, Hebei, China
- Height: 1.75 m (5 ft 9 in)
- Position: Winger

Team information
- Current team: Shaanxi Union
- Number: 36

Youth career
- 2017–2023: Beijing Guoan

Senior career*
Years	Team	Apps	(Gls)
2022–2024	Beijing Guoan	8	(1)
2024	→ Heilongjiang Ice City (loan)	27	(1)
2025–	Shaanxi Union	27	(4)
- * Club domestic league appearances and goals as of 13 November 2025

Yan Yu (simplified Chinese: 闫雨; traditional Chinese: 閆雨; pinyin: Yán Yǔ; born 3 November 2002) is a Chinese professional footballer who plays as a winger for China League One club Shaanxi Union.

== Early life ==
Yan Yu was first introduced to football when he got curious about the sport and signed up for football lessons around 2012. He is a Beijing Guoan supporter, and claims it was his childhood dream to play in front of tens of thousands of spectators. In 2017, he joined the Beijing Sinobo Guoan youth academy, playing as a full-back. In 2018, he played in the 2018 Chinese U-19 Super League for Beijing Sinobo Guoan. As Yan Yu preferred attacking, he was converted by coach Zhai Biao into a winger. In 2022, after three years without official matches at the youth level, he took part in Beijing Guoan's 2022 CFA U-21 League season. After scoring six goals and winning the CFA U-21 League title, he was credited with the Player of the Year award for his season.

== Career ==
After a wave of injuries and COVID-19 cases that hit the Beijing Guoan first-team, Yan Yu, along with nine other U-21 teammates, were given the chance to play in the Chinese Super League. Manager Stanley Menzo started Yan Yu for his professional and senior debut on 23 December 2022 in a league fixture against Guangzhou. In the 31st minute, Yan Yu connected with a Hu Jiaqi corner to give Guoan the equaliser with his goal, with the game eventually finishing at a 3–1 victory to Beijing Guoan.

Yan Yu was promoted to the Beijing Guoan first-team ahead of the 2023 season. On 9 June 2023, he made his first appearance of the season for the club, coming on as a substitute in the 67th minute in a league match against Dalian Pro, with Guoan trailing behind 2–0. The match finished 2–2. He was given eight more appearances off the bench in the 2023 season, with six being in the league and two in the 2023 Chinese FA Cup.

On 26 February 2024, Yan Yu and Guoan teammate Ma Yujun were loaned out to China League One club Heilongjiang Ice City. Yan featured in 28 matches across all competitions for Heilongjiang, grabbing one goal and one assist. Yan thanked the coaches and supporters at the end of the season ahead of his return to Beijing Guoan, and apologised on social media to the fans that he, as a starter, was not able to bring more wins to the team.

Yan departed Guoan and signed for China League One club Shaanxi Union ahead of the 2025 season.

== Career statistics ==
=== Club ===
As of 1 November 2025

Appearances and goals by club, season, and competition
Club	Season	League			Cup		Continental		Other		Total	
Club	Season	Division	Apps	Goals	Apps	Goals	Apps	Goals	Apps	Goals	Apps	Goals
Beijing Guoan	2022	Chinese Super League	1	1	0	0	–		–		1	1
Beijing Guoan	2023	Chinese Super League	7	0	2	0	–		–		9	0
Beijing Guoan	Total		8	1	2	0	0	0	0	0	10	1
Heilongjiang Ice City (loan)	2024	China League One	27	1	1	0	–		–		28	1
Shaanxi Union	2025	China League One	27	4	1	0	–		–		28	4
Career total			62	6	4	0	0	0	0	0	66	6
