= Yang Liyu =

Chinese footballer

Yang Liyu 杨立瑜
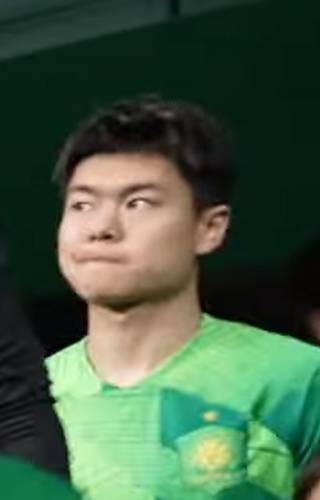
- Yang in 2023

Personal information
- Date of birth: 13 February 1997 (age 29)
- Place of birth: Chongqing, Sichuan, China
- Height: 1.81 m (5 ft 11 in)
- Position: Right winger

Team information
- Current team: Beijing Guoan
- Number: 17

Youth career
- 2010–2013: Hubei Youth
- 2013–2015: Wuhan Zall
- 2015–2016: Gondomar

Senior career*
Years	Team	Apps	(Gls)
2016–2017	Gondomar	7	(0)
2017	→ Tianjin Teda (loan)	26	(2)
2018–2022	Guangzhou FC	115	(20)
2023–	Beijing Guoan	72	(8)

International career^{‡}
2015–2016	China U-19	13	(7)
2017–2020	China U-23	17	(6)
2017–	China	4	(0)
Medal record
Representing China
Men's football
EAFF Championship
Bronze medal – third place	2017 Japan	Team
- * Club domestic league appearances and goals as of 19 November 2026 ‡ National team caps and goals as of 11 June 2019

Yang Liyu (simplified Chinese: 杨立瑜; traditional Chinese: 楊立瑜; pinyin: Yáng Lìyú; born 13 February 1997) is a Chinese professional footballer who plays for Chinese Super League club Beijing Guoan.

== Club career ==
Yang Liyu started his football career when he joined Campeonato de Portugal side Gondomar from Wuhan Zall in 2015. He made his debut for the club on 8 May 2016 in a 1–0 loss against Anadia, where he was sent off in 56th minute. He was officially promoted to the first team squad in the summer of 2016. He played six league matches for the club in the 2016–17 season.

=== Tianjin Teda ===
On 26 January 2017, Yang was loaned out to Chinese Super League side Tianjin Teda for one season. He made his debut for the club on 4 March 2017 in a 2–0 away loss against Shandong Luneng. He scored his first goal for the club on 9 August 2017 in a 3–1 away loss against Yanbian Funde. He scored his second goal for the club on 27 September 2017 in a 3–1 home win against Guizhou Hengfeng. Yang refused to extend his loan with the club at the end of the 2017 season.

=== Guangzhou Evergrande ===
On 24 December 2017, Yang transferred to fellow top tier side Guangzhou Evergrande. He made his debut for the club on 14 February 2018 in a 1–1 home draw against Buriram United in the 2018 AFC Champions League, coming on as a substitute for Alan Carvalho in the 80th minute. He scored his first goal for the club on 11 August 2018 in a 3–2 away loss against Changchun Yatai. He scored his second goal for the club on 2 September 2018 in a 2–1 win against Shanghai Shenhua, scoring the winner. The following season he would go on to establish himself as a vital member of the team that went on to win the 2019 Chinese Super League title. He made 137 appearances and scored 22 goals for Guangzhou across five seasons.

=== Beijing Guoan ===
On 30 March 2023, Yang joined Chinese Super League club Beijing Guoan. On 15 April 2024, Yang made his debut for Guoan in a 1–1 home draw against Meizhou Hakka. On 20 April 2024, he scored his first goal for Guoan in a 1–1 away draw against Wuhan Three Towns.

== International career ==
Yang was called up to the China national team by Marcello Lippi for the first time in November 2017 for the 2017 EAFF E-1 Football Championship. He made his international debut on 9 December 2017 in a 2–2 draw against South Korea.

== Career statistics ==
=== Club ===
As of 2 November 2024

Appearances and goals by club, season and competition
Club	Season	League			National cup		League cup		Continental		Other		Total	
Club	Season	Division	Apps	Goals	Apps	Goals	Apps	Goals	Apps	Goals	Apps	Goals	Apps	Goals
Gondomar	2015–16	Campeonato de Portugal	0	0	0	0	–		–		1 (Note: Appearances in Campeonato de Portugal play-offs)	0	1	0
Gondomar	2016–17	Campeonato de Portugal	6	0	0	0	–		–		–		6	0
Gondomar	Total		6	0	0	0	0	0	0	0	1	0	7	0
Tianjin Teda (loan)	2017	Chinese Super League	26	2	2	0	–		–		–		28	2
Guangzhou Evergrande	2018	Chinese Super League	18	2	2	0	–		2	0	1 (Note: Appearances in Chinese FA Super Cup)	0	23	2
Guangzhou Evergrande	2019	Chinese Super League	27	4	2	1	–		10	1	–		39	6
Guangzhou Evergrande	2020	Chinese Super League	18	0	1	0	–		4	0	–		23	0
Guangzhou Evergrande	2021	Chinese Super League	20	5	0	0	–		0	0	–		20	5
Guangzhou Evergrande	2022	Chinese Super League	32	9	0	0	–		0	0	–		32	9
Guangzhou Evergrande	Total		115	20	5	1	0	0	16	1	1	0	137	22
Beijing Guoan	2023	Chinese Super League	24	5	2	1	–		–		–		26	6
Beijing Guoan	2024	Chinese Super League	22	2	1	1	–		–		–		23	3
Beijing Guoan	Total		46	7	3	2	0	0	0	0	0	0	49	9
Career total			193	29	10	3	0	0	16	1	2	0	221	33

=== International ===
Appearances and goals by national team and year
National team	Year	Apps	Goals
China	2017	3	0
China	2018	0	0
China	2019	1	0
Total		4	0

== Honours ==
Guangzhou Evergrande

- Chinese Super League: 2019
- Chinese FA Super Cup: 2018

Beijing Guoan

- Chinese FA Cup: 2025
- Chinese FA Super Cup: 2026

Individual

- Chinese Super League Team of the Year: 2019
