= Nebijan Muhmet =

Chinese association football player

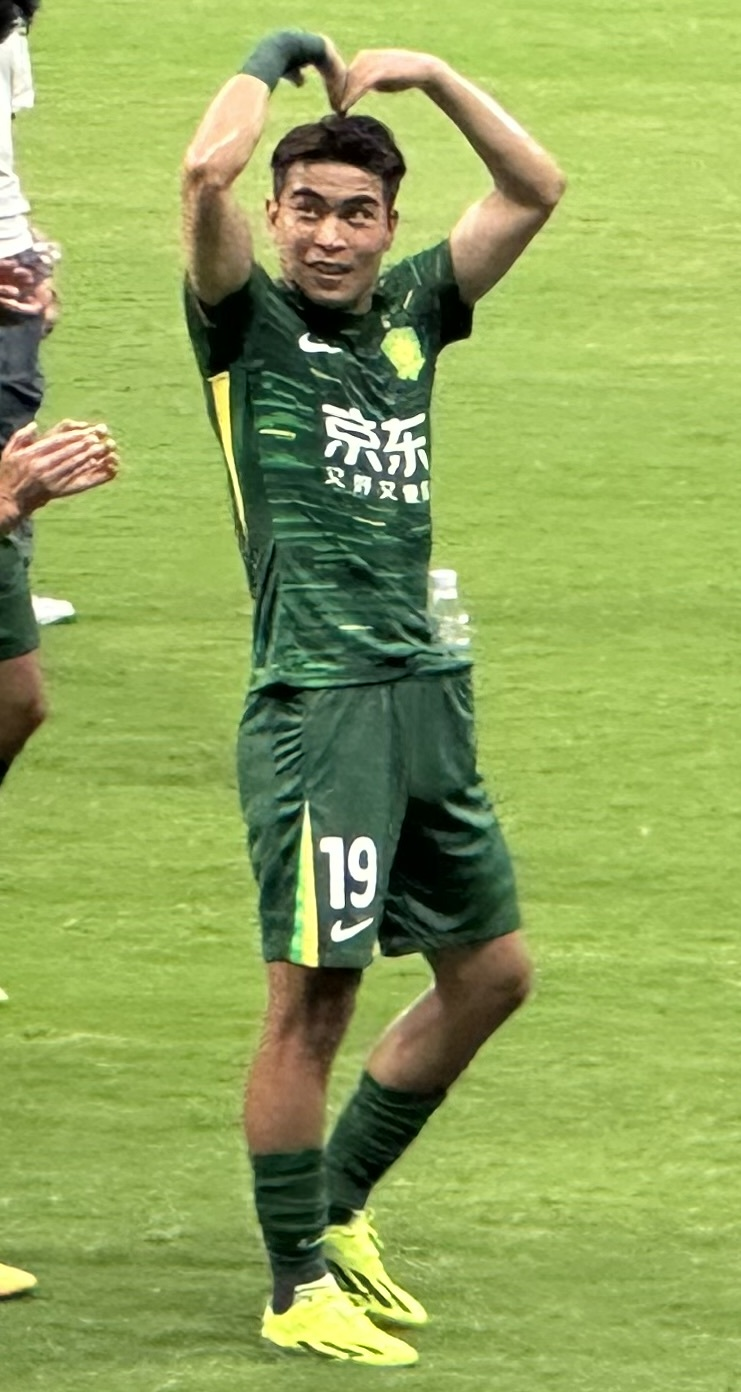
- Nebijan in June 2025

Personal information
- Date of birth: 10 July 2001 (age 25)
- Place of birth: Turpan, Xinjiang, China
- Height: 1.76 m (5 ft 9 in)
- Positions: Left winger; left-back

Team information
- Current team: Henan FC (on loan from Beijing Guoan)
- Number: 11

Youth career
- –2018: Xinjiang FA
- 2018–2021: Beijing Guoan

Senior career*
| Years | Team | Apps | (Gls) |
| 2021– | Beijing Guoan | 46 | (1) |
| 2026– | → Henan FC (loan) | 15 | (0) |

International career^{‡}
| 2018 | China U17 | 9 | (1) |
| 2019 | China U18 | 2 | (0) |
| 2023 | China U23 | 3 | (1) |
- * Club domestic league appearances and goals as of 22 November 2026 ‡ National team caps and goals as of 14:01, 26 June 2021 (UTC)

Nebijan Muhmet (Chinese: 乃比江·莫合买提; born 10 July 2001) is a Chinese footballer currently playing as a left winger or left-back for Henan FC, on loan from Beijing Guoan.

== Club career ==
Nebijan Muhmet was promoted to the senior team of Beijing Guoan within the 2021 Chinese Super League season. He would be given an opportunity to participate within senior games when he was part of the AFC Champions League squad, which was a mix of reserves and youth players to participate within centralized venues while the clubs senior players were still dealing with self-isolating measures due to COVID-19. He would make his debut in an AFC Champions League game on 26 June 2021 against United City of the Philippines, in a 1–1 draw. On 13 June 2022, he would make his league debut against Tianjin Jinmen Tiger in a 1–0 victory.

On 21 February 2026, Nebijan was loaned out to Chinese Super League club Henan FC for the 2026 season.

== Career statistics ==
As of match played 31 December 2025.

Appearances and goals by club, season and competition
| Club | Season | League | | | Cup | | Continental | | Other | | Total | |
| Club | Season | Division | Apps | Goals | Apps | Goals | Apps | Goals | Apps | Goals | Apps | Goals |
|---|---|---|---|---|---|---|---|---|---|---|---|---|
| Beijing Guoan | 2021 | Chinese Super League | 0 | 0 | 1 | 0 | 6 (Note: Appearances in the AFC Champions League) | 0 | – | | 7 | 0 |
| Beijing Guoan | 2022 | Chinese Super League | 18 | 0 | 0 | 0 | – | | – | | 18 | 0 |
| Beijing Guoan | 2023 | Chinese Super League | 11 | 1 | 2 | 1 | – | | – | | 13 | 2 |
| Beijing Guoan | 2024 | Chinese Super League | 4 | 0 | 1 | 0 | – | | – | | 5 | 0 |
| Beijing Guoan | 2025 | Chinese Super League | 13 | 0 | 3 | 0 | 2 (Note: Appearances in AFC Champions League Two) | – | – | | 18 | 0 |
| Beijing Guoan | Total | | 46 | 1 | 7 | 1 | 8 | 0 | 0 | 0 | 61 | 2 |
| Career total | | | 46 | 1 | 7 | 1 | 8 | 0 | 0 | 0 | 61 | 2 |

== Honours ==
Beijing Guoan

- Chinese FA Cup: 2025
