= Mirahmetjan Muzepper =

Chinese footballer

Mirahmetjan Muzepper 木热合买提江·莫扎帕 مىرەخمەتجان مۇزەپپەر
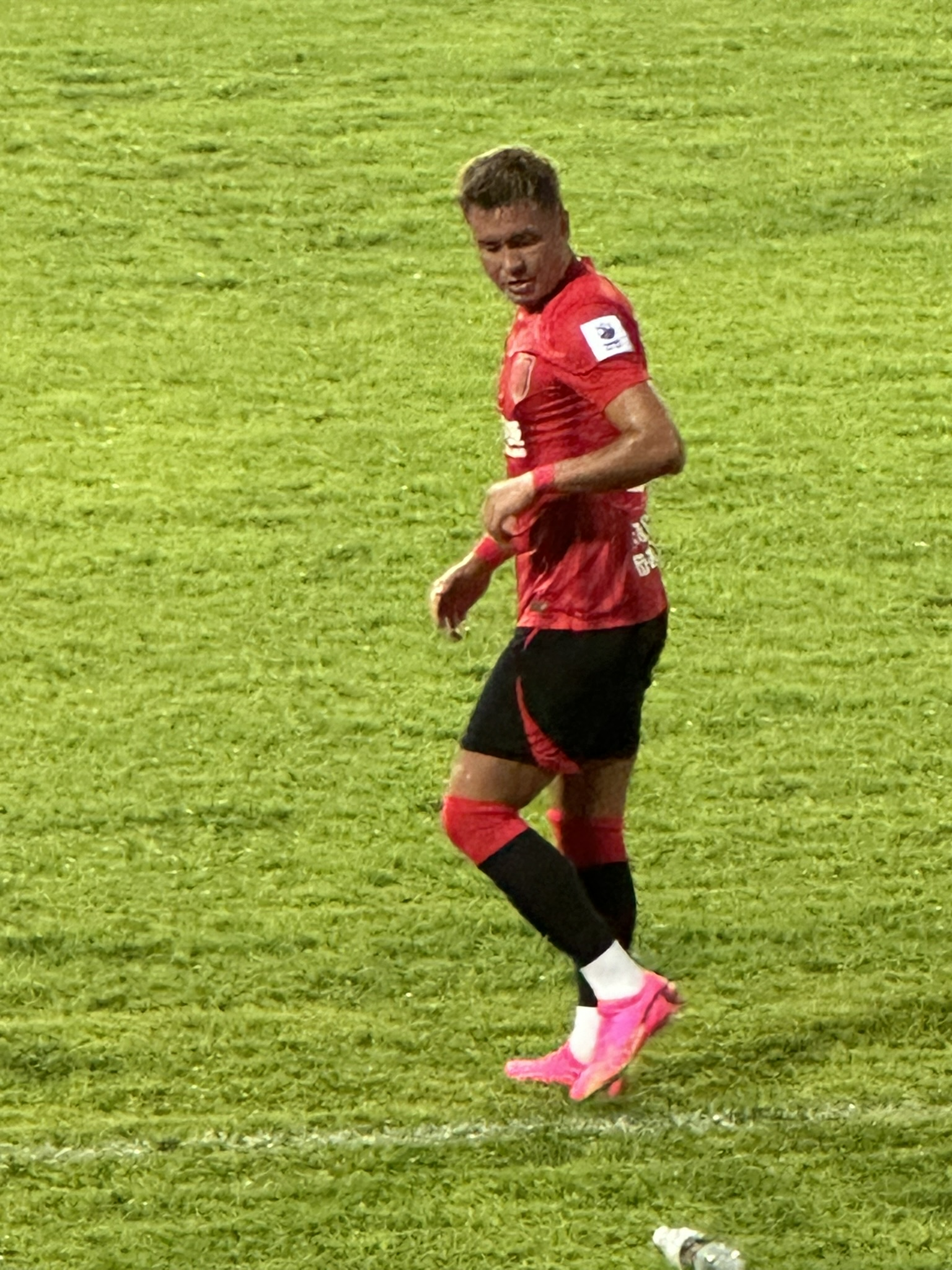
- Metjan in August 2024

Personal information
- Full name: Mirahmetjan Muzepper
- Date of birth: 14 January 1991 (age 35)
- Place of birth: Kashgar, Xinjiang, China
- Height: 1.82 m (5 ft 11 1/2 in)
- Position: Midfielder

Team information
- Current team: Chengdu Rongcheng
- Number: 25

Youth career
- 2004–2009: Shandong Taishan

Senior career*
Years	Team	Apps	(Gls)
2010	→ Henan Jianye (loan)	21	(0)
2011–2013	Shandong Luneng	15	(0)
2014–2016	Henan Jianye	41	(1)
2017–2019	Tianjin Teda	77	(2)
2020–2023	Shanghai Port	70	(1)
2024–	Chengdu Rongcheng	31	(1)

International career^{‡}
2009–2010	China U20	7	(0)
2010–2012	China U23	3	(0)
2018–2019	China	9	(0)
Medal record
Representing China
Men's football
EAFF Championship
Bronze medal – third place	2019 South Korea	Team
- * Club domestic league appearances and goals as of 31 August 2026 ‡ National team caps and goals as of 18 December 2019

Mirahmetjan "Metjan" Muzepper (Chinese: 木热合买提江·莫扎帕; pinyin: Mùrèhémǎitíjiāng Mòzhāpà; Uyghur: مىرەخمەتجان مۇزەپپەر; born 14 January 1991) is a Chinese professional footballer who plays as a midfielder for Chinese Super League club Chengdu Rongcheng. In 2018, he became the first Uyghur to play for the China national team.

== Club career ==
Mirahmetjan Muzepper grew up from a football family with his father Muzepper and grandfather Zunun Mamut both playing within the Xinjiang region. At a young age he would quickly draw the attentions of Shandong Luneng and join their youth team where he would win several youth championships, which attracted the interests of Henan Construction who took him on loan at the beginning of the 2010 Chinese Super League season where he would make his senior debut in a league game against Jiangsu Sainty on April 18, 2010 that was a 0-0 draw.

After a productive season where Mirahmetjan established himself as a regular for Henan he would return to Shandong at the beginning of the 2011 Chinese Super League and would go on to make his first senior appearance for the club in a league game against Chengdu Blades on April 1, 2011 as a substitute Wang Yongpo in a 3-3 draw. He would only be able to establish himself as a squad player within the team. On 5 January 2014, Mirahmetjan transferred to fellow Chinese Super League side Henan Jianye on a free transfer. On 31 December 2016, Henan Jianye officially confirmed that Muzepper had left the club after a disagreement in negotiations for extending his contract.

On 9 January 2017, Mirahmetjan moved to top tier side Tianjin TEDA. He would make his debut in a league game on 4 March 2017 against his former club Shandong Luneng in a 2-0 defeat. He would go on to establish himself as an integral member of the team and once he started to play more in midfield he would score his first goal for the club in a league game on 6 May 2018 against Guizhou Hengfeng in a 5-1 victory.

After three seasons in Tianjin, Mirahmetjan transferred to Shanghai SIPG (later renamed as Shanghai Port) on 17 January 2020. On 29 June 2023, Mirahmetjan scored his first goal for the club in a 2-1 away win against Beijing Guoan.

== International career ==
Mirahmetjan was called up into China U-20's squad in 2009 where he would take part in the teams 2010 AFC U-19 Championship qualification. After China's successful qualification he would draw significant attention when he became the first Uyghur player to ever be called up to the senior team. The Chinese Head coach Gao Hongbo called him up for several training sessions in preparation for 2010 East Asian Football Championship on the basis of his youth performances, however he did not feature within the tournament. He would return to the Chinese U-20 squad and take part in the 2010 AFC U-19 Championship where he would play in three games and saw China knocked out quarter-finals. After that tournament he was immediately promoted to the Chinese U-23 squad and included in the team that played in the Football at the 2010 Asian Games where he would once more play in three games and see China knocked out in the last sixteen. On 7 September 2018, he made his debut for Chinese national team in a 1–0 away defeat against Qatar, coming on for Gao Lin in the 74th minute, which made him the first Uyghur player to appear for the Chinese national team.

== Career statistics ==
=== Club statistics ===
Statistics accurate as of match played 31 January 2023.

Appearances and goals by club, season and competition
Club	Season	League			National Cup		Continental		Other		Total	
Club	Season	Division	Apps	Goals	Apps	Goals	Apps	Goals	Apps	Goals	Apps	Goals
Henan (Loan)	2010	Chinese Super League	21	0	-		0	0	-		21	0
Shandong Taishan	2011	Chinese Super League	4	0	1	0	3	1	-		8	1
Shandong Taishan	2012	Chinese Super League	8	0	2	0	-		-		10	0
Shandong Taishan	2013	Chinese Super League	3	0	1	0	-		-		4	0
Shandong Taishan	Total		15	0	4	0	3	1	0	0	22	1
Henan	2014	Chinese Super League	16	0	1	0	-		-		17	0
Henan	2015	Chinese Super League	13	1	1	0	-		-		14	1
Henan	2016	Chinese Super League	12	0	2	2	-		-		14	2
Henan	Total		41	1	4	2	0	0	0	0	45	3
Tianjin Jinmen Tiger	2017	Chinese Super League	26	0	1	0	-		-		27	0
Tianjin Jinmen Tiger	2018	Chinese Super League	27	1	1	0	-		-		28	1
Tianjin Jinmen Tiger	2019	Chinese Super League	24	1	1	0	-		-		25	1
Tianjin Jinmen Tiger	Total		77	2	3	0	0	0	0	0	80	2
Shanghai Port	2020	Chinese Super League	16	0	1	0	8	0	-		25	0
Shanghai Port	2021	Chinese Super League	18	0	7	0	0	0	-		25	0
Shanghai Port	2022	Chinese Super League	16	0	1	0	-		-		17	0
Shanghai Port	Total		50	0	9	0	8	0	0	0	67	0
Career total			204	3	20	2	11	1	0	0	235	6

=== International statistics ===
National team
Year	Apps	Goals
2018	5	0
2019	4	0
Total	9	0

== Honours ==
Shanghai Port

- Chinese Super League: 2023
