= Duan Dezhi =

Chinese association football player

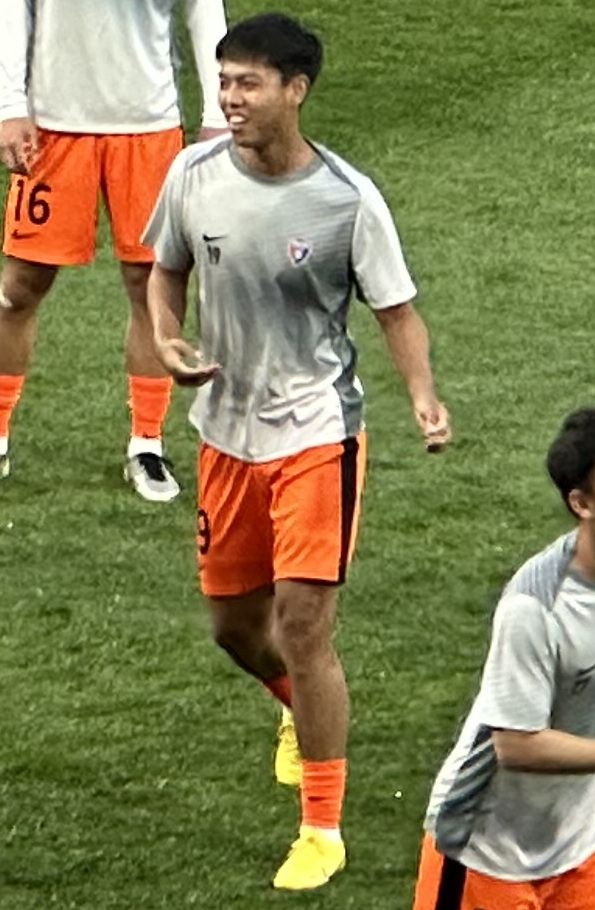
- Duan Dezhi in May 2025

Personal information
- Date of birth: 22 November 2001 (age 24)
- Place of birth: Lijiang, Yunnan, China
- Height: 1.86 m (6 ft 1 in)
- Position: Defender

Team information
- Current team: Yanbian Longding (on loan from Yunnan Yukun)
- Number: 19

Youth career
- –2020: Beijing Guoan

Senior career*
Years	Team	Apps	(Gls)
2020–2024	Beijing Guoan	3	(1)
2020	→ China U19 (loan)	9	(3)
2021	→ China U20 (loan)	13	(1)
2024	→ Suzhou Dongwu (loan)	19	(0)
2025–	Yunnan Yukun	10	(0)
2026–	→ Yanbian Longding (loan)	0	(0)

International career^{‡}
- China U18
2023–2024	China U23	8	(0)
- * Club domestic league appearances and goals as of 26 August 2025 ‡ National team caps and goals as of 14:01, 26 June 2021 (UTC)

Duan Dezhi (Chinese: 段德智; born 22 November 2001) is a Chinese footballer currently playing as a Defender for Yanbian Longding, on loan from Yunnan Yukun.

== Club career ==
Duan Dezhi first played for the Beijing Guoan youth team who loaned him out to the China U19 team, who were allowed to take part in the third tier of the Chinese pyramid, in order to gain more playing time. After returning he would participate in senior games when he was part of the AFC Champions League squad, which was a mix of reserves and youth players to participate within centralized venues while the clubs senior players were still dealing with self-isolating measures due to COVID-19. He would make his continental debut in an AFC Champions League game on 26 June 2021 against United City F.C. in a 1–1 draw. He would make his debut in a league game on 23 December 2022 against Guangzhou F.C. in a 3–1 victory, where he also scored his first goal for the club.

On 20 January 2025, Duan joined Chinese Super League club Yunnan Yukun.

On 11 January 2026, Duan was loan out to China League One club Yanbian Longding.

== Career statistics ==
As of 31 January 2023.

Club	Season	League			Cup		Continental		Other		Total	
Club	Season	Division	Apps	Goals	Apps	Goals	Apps	Goals	Apps	Goals	Apps	Goals
Beijing Guoan	2020	Chinese Super League	0	0	0	0	0	0	-		0	0
Beijing Guoan	2021	Chinese Super League	0	0	0	0	4 (Note: Appearances in the AFC Champions League)	0	-		4	0
Beijing Guoan	2022	Chinese Super League	1	1	0	0	-		-		1	1
Beijing Guoan	Total		1	1	0	0	4	0	0	0	5	1
China U19 (loan)	2020	China League Two	9	3	-		-		-		9	3
China U20 (loan)	2021	China League Two	13	1	0	0	-		-		13	1
Career total			23	5	0	0	4	0	0	0	27	5
