= 2022 Beijing Guoan F.C. season =

Beijing Guoan
2022 season
- CEO: Zhou Jinhui
- General Manager: Li Ming
- Manager: Xie Feng (until 12 August); Sui Dongliang (de facto acting) and Wei Kexing (de jure acting) (from 12 August until 29 August) (Note: Sui Dongliang did not have the required coaching license to coach at the top level of Chinese football, therefore Wei Kexing was registered as the manager while Sui performs the actual managing.); Stanley Menzo (from 29 August)
- Stadium: Beijing Fengtai Stadium (Note: Fengtai Stadium serves as Guoan's home ground this season while the team's traditional home ground Workers' Stadium undergoes renovation. Due to regulations related to COVID-19, different fields and stadiums in Meizhou, Guangdong and Haikou, Hainan have been used to host home games for Guoan in the earlier parts of the season.); Rizhao International Football Center (Note: After the CSL returned to a home-away system, Guoan applied for but was denied permission to play in Beijing due to COVID-19 regulations. Therefore, the home ground for the remainder of the season was set in Rizhao.)
- Super League: 7th
- FA Cup: Second round
- Top goalscorer: League: Zhang Yuning (19); All: Zhang Yuning (19)
- Biggest win: 4–0 (10 December 2022 vs Hebei, CSL)
- Biggest defeat: 5–1 (12 August 2022 vs Wuhan Three Towns, CSL)
Home colours	Away colours

The 2022 season was Beijing Guoan F.C.'s 58th season in football competition and the club's 19th consecutive season in the Chinese Super League since the league's founding in the 2004. It was the team's 32nd consecutive season in the top flight of Chinese football. It covered a period from 5 January 2022 to 31 December 2022.

== Summary ==
=== Pre-season ===
A whole host of action came in the first month of the pre-season. On 8 January 2022, Beijing Guoan parted ways with head coach Slaven Bilić after one season. On 14 January 2022, Xie Feng, a club legend and three-time interim coach for Guoan, was named as the new head coach. Wang Ziming and Yu Yang signed contract extensions until the end of 2025 and 2022 respectively on 29 January. The next day, Guoan announced the return of Zhang Chengdong.

In early February, Guoan began its winter training camp in Kunming with the goal of improving player fitness. The team played a training match against Beijing Sports University on 26 February with Guoan winning 6–1. Wang Ziming and Liu Guobo each scored a double, with Li Boxi and Liang Shaowen adding to Guoan's tally. March 8, Guoan players relocated to Shanghai to continue their preseason preparation, but the training camp was disrupted after Shanghai suffered an intense wave of COVID-19 outbreak. The team scrambled and relocated to Haikou to continue their training on March 18, which lasted until March 31. On March 28 during an interview with the Beijing-based television network BTV, manager Xie Feng confirmed the signing of defender Kang Sang-Woo, midfielder Samir Memišević and winger Samuel Adegbenro, and that the team hopes to bring in another attacker and midfielder respectively before the end of the transfer window. The other attacker turned on to be Marko Dabro as the club officially announced his transfer to Guoan along with the other aforementioned players on 15 and 16 April respectively. Later on 22 April, Guoan announced the singing of young striker Tian Yuda. He was given the number 29 shirt.

Guoan traveled to Meizhou, the city in which Guoan's CSL games would be played in tournament style, and began their last pre-season training camp on 13 May. On 23 May, CSL announced that its 2022 season would officially commence on 3 June.

=== June ===
The first game of the season came on 5 June against Cangzhou Mighty Lions. The team lined up with a new 3-5-2 system featuring a back line composed of academy graduate Liang Shaowen, midfielder-as-center-back Zhang Chengdong and captain Yu Dabao. New transfers Samir Memišević, Samuel Adegbenro, Kang Sang-woo also featured in the starting line-up. In the first half, both team traded chances with Guoan seemingly the better team earning numerous corners. However, an attacking misadventure from Liang Shaowen allowed Cangzhou players to poach the ball away, which led to a quick counter that saw Guoan concede its first in the season 43 minutes into the game. Trading sides, Guoan created a great chance just 20 seconds after the break with Gao Tianyi testing the opposition keeper with a close range slice in the box. In the 51st minute, another quick Cangzhou counter broke through Guoan's lines, forcing Zhang Chengdong into a last-ditch tackle attempt that saw him sent off. Chances were few and far between with Guoan a man down. To make matters worse, Adegbenro was ruled by VAR to have committed a foul while fighting for a loose ball in the Guoan box in the 74th minute, giving away a penalty that put Guoan 0–2 behind. Cangzhou saw one of its players sent off in the 87th minute equalizing the number of players for both teams, and Yu Dabao took advantage of a corner chaos to pull one back for Guoan in the 92nd minute, but it was too little and too late. Guoan ended the match with a 1–2 loss and start the season with a defeat for a consecutive season.

Guoan's second game of the season took place on 8 June against Chengdu Rongcheng. The game proved to be tough for both teams due to the heavy rain and generated a fair share of controversies. All goals were scored directly from or indirectly as a result of set pieces. Guoan took the lead with Jin Pengxiang scoring in the 11th minute after firing a shot from outside the box as the opposition struggled to clear Adegbenro's attempt after a free kick chaos. Chengdu, however, forced a Hou Sen mistake and own goal in the 25th as the ball slipped out of his hand while he tried to claim the ball in the air. Memišević put Guoan in the lead as his header from a Zhang Xizhe free kick hit the back of Chengdu's goalie and ended up in the back of the neck in the 31st. In the 41st minute, Chengdu's Abduhamit Abdugheni was sent off for head-butting Zhang Yuning after a foul, and Zhang scored a direct free kick just 4 minute later to put Guoan up 3–1. Just at the dead of the first half, Guoan conceded another to Chengdu, entering half time 3–2. In the second half, neither team managed to score, but Chengdu collected two more red cards in the 71st and 90th minute respectively, ending the game with 8 players. Another controversy from the game emerged as the referee Li Zheng blew the final whistle only 3 minutes into the 5-minute added time and had to call the team back after the players began walking off the field. The game ended as a 2–3 Guoan victory, giving the team its first win of the season.

Guoan's CSL campaign continued on 11 June against Tianjin Jinmen Tiger. While Tianjin threatened Guoan's goal multiple times, it was the new arrival and late substitute Marko Dabro who latched on to a Zhang Yuning cross and sent the ball past Tianjin's keeper in the 86th minute for a debut goal. The game ended 1–0 for Guoan, extending the win streak to two games and lifting the team up to 6th place after 3 matchdays. Despite the victory, long-time sportswriter Zhao Yu warned against optimism, stating that the win was very difficult and that the team lack midfield presence when attacking.

Guoan played against the newly promoted Meizhou Hakka on 17 June. In the 9th minute, Zhang Yuning put Guoan ahead by striking the ball clean into the net after Memišević touched it to Zhang in a free kick. In the 13th minute, however, Jin Pengxiang was on the receiving end of a bad foul and had to be stretchered off the field. Despite the setback, Guoan scored again in the 20th minute; it was again Zhang Yuning who tapped into the net a cross after a nice series of moves in the penalty area by youngster Liu Guobo. The team's lead got cut in half just three minutes later, but the game tipped in Guoan's favor in the 40th minute when Meizhou player Yang Chaosheng was shown a second yellow for shoving Chi Zhongguo. Yet, the game did not get easier for Guoan in the second half as Meizhou piled on the pressure by substituting on attacking players, which overwhelmed Guoan's defense despite having a one-man advantage. Guoan conceded in the 65th minute from a header at the end of a corner cross and failed to generate much opportunities in the latter 45 minutes of the game, ending the game in a 2–2 draw that saw the team slip to 7th place.

On 21 June, Guoan faced off against Shenzhen in the CSL. Zhang Yuning, continuing his good run of forms, helped Guoan to a 1–0 lead by heading in a Zhang Xizhe corner to the far side of the goal. For the rest of the first half, Shenzhen tried their luck from outside the box, but Guoan's defense did well to block the shots. Switching sides, Guoan grabbed another goal in the 52nd minute through Yu Dabao, who tapped the ball into the net after Zhang Xizhe sent in a cross from the left wing and Memišević flicked the ball on while falling to the ground. Memišević orchestrated Guoan's next goal as well as he sent a cross-field long ball to a surging Wang Gang, who lifted the ball across the goal for another Zhang Yuning header. Shenzhen pulled one back through a direct free kick, but Wang Ziming helped Guoan seal the game by finishing off a rebound from a Memišević shot in the 88th minute. The game, finished as a 4–1 Guoan victory, proved to be one of the best yet in the season and helped the team climb up to 5th place in the table, just three points behind the leader. Zhang Yuning also rose to the top of the golden boot race with 5 goals after 5 matchdays with the media hailing him as the "best Chinese center forward" at the moment. Later, Zhang Yuning was named the Player of the Round by the league.

On 24 June, the club announced midfielder Li Ke has temporarily left the team to return to London and receive his third surgery in the past 18 months to address the popliteal artery entrapment syndrome his legs are suffering from. Li Ke has not capped for Guoan since May 2021 due to injuries. The next day, Guoan played against Cangzhou in matchday 6 of the CSL. In the 7th minute, Guoan conceded first as a missed Kang Sang-woo interception led to a goal for Cangzhou. A controversy arose in the 34th minute as the ball hit one of Cangzhou's defenders in the box from a Guoan corner, but the referee refused to give the penalty kick after VAR review. A chance finally came for Guoan in the 83rd minute as the referee awarded a penalty for Guoan after Liu Huan was bodied in the opposition box. Zhang Yuning stepped up and sent the ball past the keeper, tying the game with his 6th goal of the season. Guoan would end the game in a 1–1 draw.

Guoan played Chengdu Rongcheng on 30 June. Manager Xie Feng rotated the team with Kang Sang-woo and Yu Dabao starting the game on the sidelines. After two competitive halves in which Guoan looked worse than their opponents both in attack and in defense, the game ended in a goalless draw. Despite maintaining 5th place with the tie, Guoan is now 7 points behind league leader Wuhan Three Towns after 7 matchdays.

=== July ===
On 3 July, Guoan faced off against Tianjin Jinmen Tigers. Zhang Yuning headed a Piao Cheng free kick into the net in the second minute of the game, but the goal was overruled as offside and disallowed after VAR review. Attacks came from both sides for the remainder of the first half, but nothing materialized for either team. Four minutes into the second half, successful pressure from Guoan in the opposition half allowed Kang Sang-woo to dig in a cross from the left flank, which Memišević headed into the net. 20 minutes later, a Nebijan Muhmet cross from a free kick on the right was again headed into the net by Memišević, doubling Guoan's lead. Tianjin pulled a goal back in the 76th minute with a shot from outside the box, but Guoan was able to maintain its lead to the end, winning the match 1–2 and remain in 5th place. Both manager Xie Feng and assistant manager Cao Xiandong were red-carded in the 80th minute for protesting a call from the referee. Memišević was later named one of the two Best Players of the Round by the league.

The Chinese FA announced on 6 July that the second phase of this year's CSL is expected to return to the regular home-and-away game format for the rest of the competition, starting with matchday 11 in August through matchday 34 in December. Guoan's home stadium remains unclear at the moment given the ongoing renovation at the Workers' Stadium, and whether the municipal government will relax COVID-19-related travel restrictions to accommodate games in Beijing is uncertain.

Guoan's matchday 10 game against Meizhou Hakka came on 7 July. In the first half, a Meizhou goal along with goals from Piao Cheng and Zhang Yuning were all disallowed. In the second half, both teams traded chances but none materialized as the game ended in a 0–0 draw and extending Guoan's unbeaten run to 8 games. Zhang Yuning was injured in the 79th minute of the game and left the field with later reports confirming that he dislocated his shoulder and sustained other injuries in the shoulder area. He left the team and returned to Beijing for further treatment.

Guoan played its last game in the first phase of this season's CSL on 11 July against Shenzhen. Wang Gang took the lead for Guoan in the 28th minute after he produced a spectacular finish from outside the box after Kang Sang-woo knocked back from the left flank a Memišević long ball. Despite continued Shenzhen pressure, Guoan managed to keep the lead until the 57th minute, when Hou Sen failed to punch clear a Shenzhen long shot that led to an easy tap-in for the opposition. Manager Xie Feng's substitution later in the game failed to generate the desired effect, and Guoan conceded again through a corner situation in the 85th minute. The game ended as a 2–1 loss for Guoan, its first in 8 games. Despite the loss, Guoan maintains its 5th place in the league table ahead of Shanghai Port and Shenzhen heading into the next phase thanks to its higher goal difference.

On 27 July, news broke that the Beijing municipal government has not approved Guoan to play home games in stadiums in the city. Therefore, as the league returns to a system of home and away games starting 6 August, Guoan will be playing its home games in neutral ground Haikou, Hainan.

=== August ===
Guoan played its first game in front an audience since the beginning of the COVID-19 pandemic on 7 August in an away match against Henan Songshan Longmen with over 6,000 fans inside the Hanghai Stadium. The game, however, started poorly for Guoan with Yu Dabao receiving a yellow card after only 4 minutes for protesting. Soon after Memišević hit the post, Guoan conceded its first goal of the game in the 8th minute as the ball slipped under Hou Sen's legs from a Henan corner. Henan scored against in the 40th minute after passing its way through Guoan's two lines of defense. In the 90th minute, Guoan received the final blow as Henan's Karanga calmly finished a one-on-one with Hou Sen. The assist that led to the final goal came from Toni Šunjić, who was acquired by Guoan and sold to Henan without ever capping for the former. Guoan ends the game with a 3–0 defeat, sliding to 8th in the standings and sitting 15 points behind league leader Wuhan Three Towns, Guoan's opponent for the following matchday.

On 10 August, Guoan announced that Rizhao International Football Center in Rizhao, Shandong will be the temporary home ground for Guoan for the remainder of the season after Guoan was rejected from playing in Beijing due to COVID-19 related regulations.

Guoan played its next CSL game away against Wuhan Three Towns on 12 August. Manager Xie Feng attempted new tactics after two consecutive losses by opting to start Cao Yongjing and Nebijan Muhmet and playing captain Yu Dabao at attacking midfield rather than at the center back position he had been playing more recently. However, the game did not go Guoan's way as the team allowed Three Towns's Marcão to score four goals and Davidson to add another. Guoan's only response came from Zhang Yuning in the 45th minute. With a stunning 5–1 loss, Guoan's largest defeat this season, the team slipped further down the table and recorded its third defeat in a role. Manager Xie Feng resigned after the game and Guoan named reserve team head coach Sui Dongliang as acting manager performing day-to-day coaching duties; however, because Sui does not have the necessary license to coach China's top flight, fellow Guoan official Wei Kexing is listed as the official manager of the team.

Guoan remained in Wuhan after the coaching shake-up and played Wuhan Yangtze River on matchday 13 on 17 August. New acting manager Sui Dongliang dropped Chang Zhengdong and Hou Sen from the lineup and reinstated Kang Sang-woo as well as Zou Dehai. Dabro was also named in the starting eleven and was tasked to play on the right wing. Guoan started the game well as Zhang Xizhe recorded his first goal of the season in the 21st minute thanks to a Dabro assist. In the 62nd minute, Guoan went 2–0 up after Kang Sang-woo latched on to Zhang Yuning's cross-field pass from a counterattack and slotted the ball past Wuhan Yangtze's keeper, scoring his first goal for the club. In the 67th minute, Kang Sang-woo returned the favor to Zhang Yuning by setting the latter up with a cross from the left flank, which Zhang headed into the net and giving Guoan a 3–0 lead. In the 84th minute, Zhang Yuning assisted substitute Cao Yongjing to put Guoan four goals up. Before the final whistle blew, Zou Dehai made a risky pass that resulted in a Wuhan Yangtze goal. Guoan finished the game 4–1, snapping a three-game loss streak in emphatic fashion. The game also saw Hou Yongyong return to action for the first time since sustaining injury in 2020.

Guoan played 17th-place Guangzhou City on 22 August. Guoan took the lead just 9 minutes into the game with Zhang Xizhe powering the ball into the net on the edge of the box after a series of delicate passing. In the 38th minute, Guoan was awarded a penalty as Zhang Yuning was fouled in the penalty area. However, Zhang Yuning missed the ensuing penalty. Right before the halftime whistle, Kang Sang-woo scored but the goal was ruled off side after extensive VAR review. Rain covered the stadium and pitch starting in the second half, making conditions difficult for both team. Kang was fouled in the 73rd minute, but Zhang Yuning's penalty was saved again. Guoan ended the game with a 1–0 victory.

26 August saw Guoan face off against old rival Shanghai Shenhua. Despite maintaining a high possession and having more shots and corners across both halves, Guoan conceded a goal each in the 30th and 34th minute. The game ended with a 0–2 Guoan loss.

On 29 August, Guoan announced former reserve coach Stanley Menzo as the team's manager. Menzo had previously coached the first team in a 2020 Chinese FA Cup match.

=== September ===
Menzo's first match as manager for the Guoan first team came on 6 September against Zhejiang. Although Guoan conceded in the 18th minute from a set piece, the team rallied and pulled one back in the 25th when Wang Gang's crossed skipped past Dabro and was finished off by Zhang Yuning. Zhang doubled his tally when he latched on to a through ball by Gao Tianyi in the 66th minute. The game, however, ended in a 2–2 draw as Memišević gave a penalty, which Zhejiang converted, in the 77th minute.

Guoan played against league-bottom Hebei on 14 September. Zhang Xizhe opened up the scoring via a calm penalty in the 28th minute after Dabro's strike was deflected by the arm of the opposition defender. With the goal, Zhang Xizhe tied Cédric Bakambu and once again became the top goalscorer in club history. Guoan gave a goal away in the 34th minute after Hebei slotted one past Zou Dehai's near side, but Wang Ziming quickly struck back in the 36th minute with an instinctive header across the Hebei goal off of a Dabro cross. Zhang Yuning increased Guoan's tally in the 50th minute after Gao Tianyi threaded a through ball into the Hebei penalty area. The game finished 3–1 in Guoan's favor, giving the club its 350th top-tier league win.

After a short hiatus due to various COVID-19 outbreaks across China, Guoan's next game came on 24 September against Dalian Pro. The team got off to a rather challenging start, conceding a goal and a yellow card in the first 20 minutes. However, Zhang Xizhe took it upon himself and scored in the 25th minute to level the game. The goal, his 49th for the club, means he now occupies the top of Guoan's all-time goalscorer list alone. 10 minutes later, Zhang missed a penalty. Late in the second half in the 81st minute, Zhang Yuning took the lead for Guoan as he finished off a Memišević rebound, but Dalian immediately equalized. Guoan ended the match with a 2–2 draw, holding 9th place in the league.

=== October ===
Guoan's season continued on 5 October against Shanghai Port. Gao Tianyi opened the scoring for Guoan in the 22nd minute following a confusion off of a corner, scoring his first goal for the club. Later in the game, Zou Dehai sustained an injury and was replaced by Hou Sen. Zhang Yuning and Adegbenro hit the post in succession, but neither teams were able to score. Guoan finished the game with a 1–0 victory.

Guoan faced Shandong Taishan next on 9 October. Both teams traded chances in the opening minutes, but it was Gao Tianyi who opened the scoring for Guoan in the 28th minute with a shot from outside the box. Shandong, however, leveled in the 39th minute from a chaotic defense situation. In the 53rd minute, Zhang Xizhe arched a corner from the right side of the pitch and Yu Dabao calmly headed the ball past the goalkeeper. Guoan went two goals up in the 74th thanks to a Zhang Xizhe set piece and Gao Tianyi header. In the final minutes, Shandong pulled two goals back via a set piece and a Wang Gang-conceded penalty after VAR review. The game ended 3–3.

In the afternoon on 24 October, Guoan's league campaign resumed against Changchun Yatai. Yatai put the ball in the net in the 7th minute, but the goal was called back after VAR review. In the 35th minute, it was Guoan who took the lead thanks to Zhang Yuning's header at the end of an arching Zhang Xizhe cross. Neither team made further progress in the second half, and the game ended 1–0 in favor of Guoan. With the win, Guoan secured its 6th consecutive game without losing.

Guoan played against Guangzhou on 29 October. In what turned out to be a thumping first half, Guoan put 4 past Guangzhou. Zhang Yuning opened the scoring from a Zhang Xizhe corner in the 10th minute. In the 21st minute, Zhang Yuning knocked the ball to Adegbenro right in front of Guangzhou's goal, setting the latter up for his first goal for Guoan. The onslaught continued with Memišević finishing off a Zhang Xizhe corner with a header, and Adegbenro doubled his tally for the day from a chaotic set piece situation. In the second half, Guoan decided to substitute and rest a few key players, and eventually conceded one to Guangzhou in the 76th minute. Guoan finished the gam 4–1, extending its undefeated run to 7 games.

=== November ===
Guoan's first game of November came against Henan Songshan Longmen on 4 November. Guoan took the lead in the 13th minute thanks to Zhang Xizhe threading the ball past two lines of defense; Zhang Yuning latched on to the ball, touched it past the opposition keeper and scored his 15th goal of this CSL campaign. In the 74th minute, Guoan players failed to clear the ball from danger, conceding a long-ranged effort from the top of the box. Approaching the final minutes of the game, Adegbenro attempted a one-on-one inside Henan's box and was subsequently tripped over by a Henan defender. The referee pointed to the penalty spot, and Kang Sang-woo sent keeper the wrong way to restore Guoan's lead in the 90th minute. The game ended 2–1 in Guoan's favor, and the team extended its unbeaten streak to 8 games.

Guoan played league leader Wuhan Three Towns on the night of 8 November. After a heated first half, Guoan conceded after Hou Sen slipped in the area and then failed to gain control of the ball, resulting in an easy tap-in for Three Towns. Guoan continued to pressure in the second half, but had no chance after Bai Yang tripped a Three Towns player in Guoan's own box and giving away a penalty. Guoan ended the game 0–2, ending the defeat-less 8-game run.

Few nights after on 13 November, Guoan played Wuhan Yangtze River. Two teams traded chances in the first half, but nothing came to fruition for either team. Trading sides, it was Guoan who conceded first. Hou Sen, trying to deny a Wuhan shot, rushed out of the goal, but was judged to have tripped the opposition player. Despite picking the right side, Hou was unable to stop the penalty, resulting in Guoan being a goal down in the 52nd minute. The situation changed for Guoan immediately afterwards, however. Memišević sent in a long cross from right midfield that skipped between two Wuhan defenders to land right in front of Adegbenro, who calmly put the ball past the keeper to tie the game up in the 55th minute. Less than 10 minutes late after a series of delicate touches, Wang Ziming sent the ball across the box with Wang Gang following up for another goal for Guoan. In added time, Guoan took advantage of a counterattack situation and Adegbenro set up Kang Sang-woo with a cross from the edge of the box for a third goal. The game ended with a 3–1 comeback victory Guoan.

On 17 November, Guoan embarked on the campaign for this season's Chinese FA Cup against Jingchuan Wenhui, a team from the fourth-tier Chinese Football Association Member Association Champions League. Guoan named a rotated squad featuring young and fringe players. Against all odds, Jingchuan opened the scoring just 4 minutes into the game via a direct free kick. In the 35th minute, Guoan leveled via Liu Guobo from a Ruan Qilong cross. In the second half, Guoan grabbed the lead in the 54th minute after Cao Yongjing converted from the spot a penalty earned by Ruan Qilong. However, Guoan's defense would make a mistake in the 70th minute that allows Jingchuan to tie the game 2–2. With both team failing to score in regulation, the game moved to penalties. Both teams made the first three respectively. Fourth in line to take the penalty, Jin Taiyan missed. With Jingchuan scoring its fourth and fifth, Guoan was eliminated from the FA Cup in just the second round. Chinese media widely consider Guoan's defeat extremely surprising.

After the disappointing and shocking exit in the CFA Cup, Guoan resumed its league campaign on 21 November against Guangzhou City. It took Zhang Yuning only 3 minutes to open the scoring for Guoan, heading into the net a Kang Sang-woo cross at close range. In the 23rd minute, Kang Sang-woo got himself on the scoresheet via a strike from outside the box. In the 54th minute, Yu Dabao was sent off for a last-ditched tackle to stop a Guangzhou break. A man down, Nebijan Muhmet was judged to have impeded a Guangzhou player inside the box in the 60th minute, but the penalty call was overruled by VAR. In the final minutes of the game, Guangzhou gained and scored a penalty as the result of a Cao Yongjing handball within the penalty area. Despite Guangzhou's late insurgency, Guoan managed the 1–2 victory, leapfrogging the team to 4th in the league standings.

Guoan faced off against old rival Shanghai Shenhua on 25 November. In the 7th minute, Guoan conceded first after the ball fell for the opponent in front of goal after a scramble. In the second half, it was Guoan who opened the scoring via Zhang Xizhe in the 54th minute. Wang Gang sent the ball to the center of the penalty area, which was deflected to Zhang Xizhe's feet. Taking a few moments to feign a shot, Zhang Xizhe neatly tucked the ball into the bottom corner of the goal. With the goal, Zhang Xizhe is now joint top with Cédric Bakambu as the club's top scorer in all competitions with 58 goals; Zhang Xizhe also became the first Guoan player to score 50 league goals in his career. Zhang Yuning added to Guoan's tally in the 76th minute with a powerful strike just on the edge of the box after Gao Tianyi set him up with a short touch. Shenhua piled on the attack after going a goal down, but was unable to tie the game. Guoan ended the game with a 1–2 comeback victory, notching a three-game win streak.

On the last day of November, Guoan played against Zhejiang in a crucial match for the team's ambition to remain in the top four spots. The game started off seemingly well for Guoan. Zhang Yuning won a penalty in the 4th minute, although it was overturned by VAR; Yu Dabao scored in the 34th, but was ruled offside. However, in the second minute of added time in the first half, it was Zhejiang who broke through and scored the first goal of the game. In the 62nd minute after a series of threatening chances, Zhejiang scored again. Wang Ziming had yet again put the ball in Zhejiang's net for Guoan, but the goal was once more deemed offside. Guoan concluded the game with a 2–0 loss, dropping down to 7th in the standings and snapping a three-game win streak.

=== December ===
Guoan's first game in December was against Dalian Pro. After a fruitless first half from both teams, Dalian was first to open the scoring in the 49th minute through a set piece header. Dalian doubled its lead in the 76th minute with a strike from outside the box. Former Guoan player Lü Peng gave Dalian its third goal after a miscommunication between Guoan defenders and Hou Sen caused the latter to rush out the box and slip, therefore giving Lü an open goal to aim for. In the 92nd minute, Wang Ziming scored Guoan's consolation goal by latching onto a through-ball by Chi Zhongguo. Guoan ended the game with a 1–3 loss.

Guoan's form turned around as they played league last and already-relegated Hebei on 10 December. Forced to rotate the squad due to injuries, suspensions and loan prohibition, Menzo named youngster Ruan Qilong to the starting lineup. He was asked to play as a defensive midfielder, different from his usual central defender position. Ruan proved to be the key player in the game as he thumped the ball into the Hebei net from outside the box in the 32nd minute to give Guoan the lead. Liu Huan doubled Guoan's advantage in the 42nd minute with a ranged strike that dipped just as it reached the Hebei keeper and forced erroneous save. In the second half after a Zhang Xizhe corner was knocked outside the penalty area in the 55th minute, Ruan Qilong latched onto the ball with another powerful ranged strike, putting Guoan 3–0 ahead. Final goal in the game came in the 68th minute as Pan Ximing from Hebei headed the ball into the team's own net as he attempted to clear a Zhang Xizhe cross. Guoan emerged victorious in the end with a 4–0 scoreline, returning to winning forms and handing Hebei their 23rd consecutive defeat in CSL.

Guoan played against Changchun Yatai on 15 December. Due to COVID-19 outbreak within the team, Yatai had opted to start many youngsters. Guoan took the lead in the 30th minute with a header by Wang Ziming at the end of a Kang Sang-woo cross. After the break, Wang Ziming doubled his tally in the 51st minute by curving the ball past the opposition defender and keeper. Kang Sang-woo was fouled inside the box in the 61st minute, and Zhang Yuning converted the subsequent penalty to put Guoan three goals up. The game ended with a 3–0 victory for Guoan.

Guoan faced off against Guangzhou on 23 December. The game was difficult for the team as a majority of the first team had contracted COVID-19 and was unable to play. Menzo was forced to name numerous players from the club's youth ranks in the starting eleven and had only four bench players. In the 7th minute, debutant Ling Zhongyang committed a foul in the penalty area which Guangzhou converted, leaving the team one goal down. However, the team fought back. In the 32nd minute, fellow debutant Yan Yu scored with a header from a corner, leveling the game at 1–1 and notching his first top-tier goal. A mere two minutes later, Duan Dezhi, another youngster playing his first CSL match, managed to force a keeper error from an awkward shot and put Guoan in the lead with his first CSL goal as well. Guoan scored another in the 42nd minute after Tian Yuda's through-ball was slid past the goalie by Zhang Yuning for his 19th this season. Neither team scored in the second half, but Tian Yuda received a red card in the 76th minute for a heavy tackle. Guoan won the game 1–3.

On 27 December, the club announced that it would abandon the scheduled match against Shanghai Port as the team is unable field a full starting lineup despite promoting youth players to the first team due to widespread COVID-19 infection in the club. Shanghai Port was awarded a 3–0 win. With a four-point gap to 5th place and one match remaining, it became mathematically impossible for Guoan to contend for a top-5 finish.

On 28 December, the club also announced that it would abandon the final match with Shandong Taishan due to COVID-19 infections within the team. Guoan finished the season 7th in the league with 17 wins, 7 draws and 10 losses.

== Players ==
As of 8 May 2022

Note: Flags indicate national team as defined under FIFA eligibility rules; some limited exceptions apply. Players may hold more than one non-FIFA nationality.

No.	Pos.	Nation	Player
1	GK	CHN	Hou Sen
3	DF	CHN	Yu Yang
5	DF	BIH	Samir Memišević (on loan from Hebei)
6	MF	CHN	Chi Zhongguo
7	MF	CHN	Hou Yongyong
8	MF	CHN	Piao Cheng
9	FW	CHN	Zhang Yuning
10	MF	CHN	Zhang Xizhe
11	FW	NGA	Samuel Adegbenro
14	GK	CHN	Zou Dehai
15	MF	CHN	Gao Tianyi
16	DF	CHN	Jin Pengxiang
17	DF	KOR	Kang Sang-woo
18	DF	CHN	Jin Taiyan
19	DF	CHN	Liu Huan
20	FW	CHN	Wang Ziming
22	DF	CHN	Yu Dabao (captain)

No.	Pos.	Nation	Player
25	GK	CHN	Guo Quanbo
26	DF	CHN	Bai Yang
27	DF	CHN	Wang Gang
28	MF	CHN	Zhang Chengdong
29	FW	CHN	Tian Yuda
30	FW	CRO	Marko Dabro
31	FW	CHN	Li Boxi
32	MF	CHN	Liu Guobo
33	GK	CHN	Ma Kunyue
34	MF	CHN	Nebijan Muhmet
35	MF	CHN	Chen Yanpu
36	DF	CHN	Liang Shaowen
37	MF	CHN	Cao Yongjing
38	DF	CHN	Ruan Qilong
41	FW	CHN	Leng Jixuan
43	MF	CHN	Shi Yucheng

== Transfers ==
=== In ===
#	Position	Nationality	Name	Age	Moving from	Type	Transfer Window	Ends	Fee	Source
28	MF	(China)	Zhang Chengdong	32	(China) Hebei	Transfer	Winter			
11	FW	(Nigeria)	Samuel Adegbenro	26	(Sweden) Norrköping	Transfer	Winter		¥20M	
17	FW	(Croatia)	Marko Dabro	24	(Croatia) Lokomotiva	Transfer	Winter		¥7M	
30	DF	(South Korea)	Kang Sang-woo	28	(South Korea) Pohang Steelers	Transfer	Winter		¥5.25M	
5	DF	(Bosnia and Herzegovina)	Samir Memišević	28	(China) Hebei	Loan	Winter	2023		
29	FW	(China)	Tian Yuda	20	(China) Shandong Taishan	Transfer	Winter			
	FW	(China)	Ba Dun	26	(China) Tianjin Jinmen Tiger	End of loan	Winter		Free	

=== Out ===
#	Position	Nationality	Name	Age	Moving to	Type	Transfer Window	Fee	Source
28	FW	(China)	He Zhenyu	20	(England) Wolverhampton Wanderers	End of loan	Winter	Free	
	FW	(China)	Ba Dun	26	(China) Tianjin Jinmen Tiger	Transfer	Winter	Free	
24	DF	(China)	Yang Fan	25	(China) Tianjin Jinmen Tiger	Loan	Winter	Free	
29	DF	(China)	Jiang Tao	32		End of contract	Winter	Free	

== Friendlies ==
26 February 2022 Friendly	Beijing Guoan	6–1	(China) Beijing BSU	Kunming, China
	Wang Ziming; Liu Guobo; Li Boxi; Liang Shaowen

23 March 2022 Friendly	Beijing Guoan	5–1	(China) Hainan Star	Haikou, China

26 March 2022 Friendly	Beijing Guoan	1–0	(China) Meizhou Hakka	Haikou, China

30 March 2022 Friendly	Beijing Guoan	1–1	(China) Henan Songshan Longmen	Haikou, China

17 April 2022 Friendly	Beijing Guoan	4–0	(China) Beijing BIT	Beijing, China
	Liang Shaowen; Cao Yongjing; Piao Cheng; Xie Longfei

24 April 2022 Friendly	Beijing Guoan	6–2	(China) Beijing BIT	Beijing, China

29 July 2022 Friendly	Beijing Guoan	1–1	(China) Tianjin Jinmen Tiger	Beijing, China

== Competitions ==
=== Overview ===
Competition	First match	Last match	Starting round	Final position	Record							
Competition	First match	Last match	Starting round	Final position	Pld	W	D	L	GF	GA	GD	Win %
Chinese Super League	5 June 2022	31 December 2022	Matchday 1	7th place	34	17	7	10	57	49	+8	50.00
Chinese FA Cup	17 November 2022	17 November 2022	Second round	Second round	1	0	0	1	2	2	+0	0.00
Total					35	17	7	11	59	51	+8	48.57

Last updated: complete
Source: Soccerway

=== Chinese Super League ===
==== Results summary ====
Overall								Home						Away					
Pld	W	D	L	GF	GA	GD	Pts	W	D	L	GF	GA	GD	W	D	L	GF	GA	GD
34	17	7	10	57	49	+8	58	8	4	5	28	22	+6	9	3	5	29	27	+2

Last updated: complete.

==== Results by round ====
Round	1	2	3	4	5	6	7	8	9	10	11	12	13	14	15	16	17	18	19	20	21	22	23	24	25	26	27	28	29	30	31	32	33	34
Ground (Note: All games in CSL are played on neutral grounds with limited or no attancence to mitigate potential impact of the COVID-19 pandemic. Recorded here are whether the game is designated home or away.)	H	A	H	A	H	A	H	A	H	A	A	A	A	H	H	H	A	H	A	H	A	H	H	H	H	A	A	A	H	A	H	A	H	A
Result	L	W	W	D	W	D	D	W	D	L	L	L	W	W	L	D	D	W	W	W	W	D	W	L	W	W	W	L	L	W	W	W	L	L
Position	12	9	6	7	5	5	5	5	5	5	8	12	8	6	9	9	9	9	9	8	7	7	6	7	6	6	5	7	7	6	6	6	6	7

Source: Competitive matches
A = Away; H = Home; W = Win; D = Draw; L = Loss

==== League table ====
Pos	Team	Pld	W	D	L	GF	GA	GD	Pts
5	Chengdu Rongcheng	34	18	11	5	49	28	+21	65 (Note: Zhejiang finished ahead of Shanghai Port and Chengdu Rongcheng on head-to-head points and Shanghai Port finished ahead of Chengdu Rongcheng on head-to-head points: Zhejiang 2–1 Shanghai Port, Shanghai Port 1–1 Zhejiang, Zhejiang 1–1 Chengdu Rongcheng, Chengdu Rongcheng 1–1 Zhejiang, Shanghai Port 3–0 Chengdu Rongcheng, Chengdu Rongcheng 0–0 Shanghai Port.)
6	Henan Songshan Longmen	34	17	8	9	60	32	+28	59
7	Beijing Guoan	34	17	7	10	57	49	+8	58
8	Tianjin Jinmen Tiger	34	14	7	13	45	42	+3	49 (Note: Tianjin Jinmen Tiger finished ahead of Meizhou Hakka on head-to-head points: Tianjin Jinmen Tiger 1–0 Meizhou Hakka, Meizhou Hakka 1–1 Tianjin Jinmen Tiger.)
9	Meizhou Hakka	34	14	7	13	43	41	+2	49

Source: Soccerway
Rules for classification:
- During season: 1) Points; 2) Goal difference; 3) Goals scored.
- After season: 1) Points; 2) Head-to-head points; 3) Head-to-head goal difference; 4) Head-to-head goals scored; 5) Scores of the weight ratio of the reserve league and youth leagues.
  Notes:

==== Matches ====
5 June 2022 1	Beijing Guoan	1–2	Cangzhou Mighty Lions	Meizhou
19:00 UTC+8	Zhang Chengdong (red card) 51'; Memišević (yellow card) 66'; Yu Dabao 90'; Liang Shaowen (yellow card) 90'	Report	Piao Shihao (yellow card) 34'; Guo Hao (yellow card) 41' (yellow-red card) 87'; Bughrahan Skandar 43'; Oscar 79' (pen.); Shao Puliang (yellow card) 90'	Stadium: Meixian Tsang Hin-chi Stadium; Attendance: 0 Referee: Dai Yige

8 June 2022 2	Chengdu Rongcheng	2–3	Beijing Guoan	Meizhou
19:30 UTC+8	Hou Sen 26' (o.g.); Abduhamit Abdugheni (red card) 41'; Feng Zhuoyi 45+5'; Guo Hao (yellow card) 59' (yellow-red card) 89'; Gou Junchen (red card) 74'	Report	Jin Pengxiang 11'; Zhang Yan 31' (o.g.); Wang Gang (yellow card) 35'; Zhang Yuning (yellow card) 40' (goal) 45'; Yu Dabao (yellow card) 48'; Gao Tianyi (yellow card) 85'	Stadium: Meixian Tsang Hin-chi Stadium; Attendance: 0 Referee: Li Zheng

13 June 2022 3	Beijing Guoan	1–0	Tianjin Jinmen Tiger	Meizhou
16:30 UTC+8	Dabro 86'	Report	Radonjić (yellow card) 90+6'	Stadium: Hengbei Football Town Field No.9; Attendance: 0 Referee: Shi Zhenlu

17 June 2022 4	Meizhou Hakka	2–2	Beijing Guoan	Meizhou
19:30 UTC+8	Yang Chaosheng (yellow card) 6' (yellow-red card) 41'; Vukanović 24'; Kosović (yellow card) 43'; Dugalić 65'; Nuñez (yellow card) 65'	Report	Zhang Yuning 10', 21'; Liu Guobo (yellow card) 80'; Yu Dabao (yellow card) 87'	Stadium: Wuhua County Olympic Sports Centre; Attendance: 0 Referee: Wang Jing

21 June 2022 5	Beijing Guoan	4–1	Shenzhen	Meizhou
16:30 UTC+8	Zhang Yuning 2', 60'; Wang Gang (yellow card) 43'; Zou Dehai (yellow card) 47'; Yu Dabao 52'; Memišević (yellow card) 58'; Wang Ziming 88'	Report	Acheampong 63'	Stadium: Hengbei Football Town Field No.9; Attendance: 0 Referee: Shi Zhenlu

25 June 2022 6	Cangzhou Mighty Lions	1–1	Beijing Guoan	Meizhou
16:30 UTC+8	Piao Shihao 7'; Zang Yifeng (yellow card) 74'; Lin Chuangyi (yellow card) 90+2'	Report	Yu Dabao (yellow card) 44'; Zhang Chengdong (yellow card) 53'; Yu Yang (yellow card) 74'; Zhang Yuning 84' (pen.)	Stadium: Hengbei Football Town Field No.9; Attendance: 0 Referee: Wang Jing

30 June 2022 7	Beijing Guoan	0–0	Chengdu Rongcheng	Meizhou
19:30 UTC+8		Report		Stadium: Wuhua County Olympic Sports Centre; Attendance: 0 Referee: Liu Wei

3 July 2022 8	Tianjin Jinmen Tiger	1–2	Beijing Guoan	Meizhou
17:30 UTC+8	Su Yuanjie 77'	Report	Memišević 49', 69'; Yu Dabao (yellow card) 51'; Hou Sen (yellow card) 65'; Chi Zhongguo (yellow card) 74'	Stadium: Meixian Tsang Hin-chi Stadium; Attendance: 0 Referee: Memetjan Ahmat

7 July 2022 9	Beijing Guoan	0–0	Meizhou Hakka	Meizhou
17:30 UTC+8	Chi Zhongguo (yellow card) 90+3'	Report		Stadium: Meixian Tsang Hin-chi Stadium; Attendance: 0 Referee: Shi Zhenlu

11 July 2022 10	Shenzhen	2–1	Beijing Guoan	Meizhou
19:30 UTC+8	Li Yuanyi (yellow card) 30'; Yeljan Shinar (yellow card) 31'; Gao Lin 57'; Wang Yongpo (yellow card) 60'; Yuan Mincheng 85'	Report	Wang Gang 28'; Memišević (yellow card) 40'; Yu Yang (yellow card) 82'	Stadium: Wuhua County Olympic Sports Centre; Attendance: 0 Referee: Zhang Long

7 August 2022 11	Henan Songshan Longmen	3–0	Beijing Guoan	Zhengzhou
19:30 UTC+8	Dourado 9'; Zhong Yihao 41'; Mierzejewski (yellow card) 61'; Šunjić (yellow card) 72'; Karanga 90'	Report	Yu Dabao (yellow card) 4'; Zhang Chengdong (yellow card) 86'	Stadium: Zhengzhou Hanghai Stadium; Attendance: 6,567; Referee: Li Haixin

12 August 2022 12	Wuhan Three Towns	5–1	Beijing Guoan	Wuhan
19:30 UTC+8	Marcão 6', 20', 50', 61' (yellow card) 12'; Davidson 68'	Report	Cao Yongjing (yellow card) 24'; Zhang Yuning 45+1'; Zhang Chengdong (yellow card) 82'	Stadium: Wuhan Sports Center; Referee: Ma Ning

17 August 2022 13	Wuhan Yangtze River	1–4	Beijing Guoan	Wuhan
19:30 UTC+8	Viana (yellow card) 58'; Forbes (yellow card) 68'; Kajević 87'	Report	Zhang Xizhe 22'; Kang Sang-woo 62'; Zhang Yuning 67'; Cao Yongjing 84'; Nebijan Muhmet (yellow card) 90+1'	Stadium: Wuhan Five Rings Sports Center; Referee: Wang Di

22 August 2022 14	Beijing Guoan	1–0	Guangzhou City	Rizhao
19:30 UTC+8	Zhang Xizhe 9'	Report	Zhang Gong (yellow card) 29'; Wu Junjie (yellow card) 51'; Han Jiaqi (yellow card) 77'; Fu Yuncheng (yellow card) 77'	Stadium: Rizhao International Football Center; Referee: Gu Chunhan

26 August 2022 15	Beijing Guoan	0–2	Shanghai Shenhua	Rizhao
19:30 UTC+8		Report	Yu Hanchao 31'; Bassogog 36' (pen.); Wang Haijian (yellow card) 66'; Zhou Junchen (yellow card) 68'	Stadium: Rizhao International Football Center; Referee: Zhang Long

6 September 2022 16	Beijing Guoan	2–2	Zhejiang	Rizhao
19:30 UTC+8	Zhang Yuning 25', 66'; Memišević (yellow card) 90+5'	Report	Andrijašević 18'; Dong Yu (yellow card) 54'; Matheus 81' (pen.)	Stadium: Rizhao International Football Center; Referee: Wang Jing

14 September 2022 18	Beijing Guoan	3–1	Hebei	Rizhao
19:30 UTC+8	Zhang Xizhe 29' (pen.); Wang Ziming 36'; Zhang Yuning 50'; Tian Yuda (yellow card) 90+1'	Report	Luan Haodong (yellow card) 26'; Zhang Junzhe (yellow card) 28'; Chen Yunhua 34'; Xu Tianyuan (yellow card) 37'	Stadium: Rizhao International Football Center; Referee: Xu Qiangqiang

24 September 2022 17	Dalian Pro	2–2	Beijing Guoan	Dalian
19:30 UTC+8	Tsonev 7'; Manzoki 83'	Report	Chi Zhongguo (yellow card) 19'; Zhang Xizhe 25'; Adegbenro (yellow card) 72'; Zhang Yuning 81'	Stadium: Puwan Stadium; Referee: Ma Ning

5 October 2022 21	Shanghai Port	0–1	Beijing Guoan	Dalian
19:30 UTC+8	Li Ang (yellow card) 56'; Matías Vargas (yellow card) 64'	Report	Gao Tianyi 22'; Zhang Chengdong (yellow card) 36'; Zou Dehai (yellow card) 57'; Liu Huan (yellow card) 90+5'	Stadium: Dalian Sports Center Stadium; Referee: Li Haixin

9 October 2022 22	Beijing Guoan	3–3	Shandong Taishan	Rizhao
19:30 UTC+8	Gao Tianyi 28', 74' (yellow card) 78'; Yu Dabao 53'	Report	Song Long (yellow card) 33'; Crysan 39'; Moisés 89', 90+5' (pen.)	Stadium: Rizhao International Football Center; Referee: Shi Zhenlu

24 October 2022 19	Changchun Yatai	0–1	Beijing Guoan	Changchun
15:30 UTC+8	He Guan (yellow card) 25'; Cheng Changcheng (yellow card) 32'; He Yiran (yellow card) 66'	Report	Yu Dabao (yellow card) 26'; Zhang Yuning 35'	Stadium: Changchun Stadium; Referee: Li Haixin

29 October 2022 20	Beijing Guoan	4–1	Guangzhou	Rizhao
19:30 UTC+8	Zhang Yuning 10'; Adegbenro 21', 33'; Memišević 27'; Wang Ziming (yellow card) 86'	Report	Fan Hengbo (yellow card) 57'; Li Yang (yellow card) 61'; Yang Liyu 76'	Stadium: Rizhao International Football Center; Referee: Dai Yige

4 November 2022 23	Beijing Guoan	2–1	Henan Songshan Longmen	Rizhao
19:30 UTC+8	Zhang Yuning 12'; Zhang Xizhe (yellow card) 17'; Memišević (yellow card) 43'; Kang Sang-woo 90' (pen.)	Report	Huang Zichang (yellow card) 27'; Chen Keqiang 74'; Šunjić (yellow card) 82'; Zhong Yihao (yellow card) 90+5'; Karanga (yellow card) 90+5'	Stadium: Rizhao International Football Center; Referee: Xing Qi

8 November 2022 24	Beijing Guoan	0–2	Wuhan Three Towns	Rizhao
19:30 UTC+8	Kang Sang-woo (yellow card) 38'	Report	Deng Hanwen 45+1'; Davidson (yellow card) 50'; Xie Pengfei (yellow card) 90'; Ademilson 90+5'	Stadium: Rizhao International Football Center; Referee: Li Haixin

13 November 2022 25	Beijing Guoan	3–1	Wuhan Yangtze River	Rizhao
19:30 UTC+8	Chi Zhongguo (yellow card) 23'; Memišević (yellow card) 51'; Adegbenro 55'; Wang Gang 64'; Hou Sen (yellow card) 90+3'; Kang Sang-woo 90+4'	Report	Ye Chongqiu (yellow card) 18'; Brown Forbes 52' (pen.); Nie Aoshuang (yellow card) 57'; Viana (yellow card) 67'	Stadium: Rizhao International Football Center; Referee: Zhang Long

21 November 2022 26	Guangzhou City	1–2	Beijing Guoan	Jinjiang
19:30 UTC+8	Tang Miao (yellow card) 26'; Li Tixiang (yellow card) 66'; Zhang Gong (yellow card) 73'; Guilherme 90+3' (pen.)	Report	Zhang Yuning 4'; Kang Sang-woo 24'; Yu Dabao (red card) 55'; Wang Gang (yellow card) 90+2'	Stadium: Jinjiang Football Training Center Stadium; Referee: Zhen Wei

25 November 2022 27	Shanghai Shenhua	1–2	Beijing Guoan	Jinjiang
19:30 UTC+8	Denny Wang 7'; Yang Xu (yellow card) 29'; Jiang Shenglong (yellow card) 42'; Zhu Jianrong (yellow card) 90+2'	Report	Zhang Xizhe 54'; Zhang Yuning 76', (yellow card) 90+1'	Stadium: Jinjiang Football Training Center Stadium; Referee: Tang Shunqi

30 November 2022 28	Zhejiang	2–0	Beijing Guoan	Huzhou
19:30 UTC+8	Wang Dongsheng (yellow card) 23'; Zhang Jiaqi (yellow card) 34'; Dong Yu (yellow card) 40'; Ewolo 45+2'; Ablikim Abdusalam (yellow card) 45+6'; Possignolo (yellow card) 61'; Andrijašević 62'; Matheus (yellow card) 90+2'	Report	Memišević (yellow card) 15'; Gao Tianyi (yellow card) 34'; Yu Dabao (yellow card) 66'	Stadium: Huzhou Olympic Sports Centre; Referee: Shen Yinhao

5 December 2022 29	Beijing Guoan	1–3	Dalian Pro	Rizhao
15:30 UTC+8	Zhang Xizhe (yellow card) 21'; Wang Ziming 90+2'	Report	Lin Liangming 49', 76'; Lü Peng 88'	Stadium: Rizhao International Football Center; Referee: He Kai

10 December 2022 30	Hebei	0–4	Beijing Guoan	Haikou
15:00 UTC+8		Report	Ruan Qilong 32', 55'; Liu Huan (yellow card) 35', (goal) 43'; Pan Ximing 69' (o.g.); Wang Gang (yellow card) 83'	Stadium: Haikou Mission Hills Football Training Base Main Field; Referee: Sun Shengyu

15 December 2022 31	Beijing Guoan	3–0	Changchun Yatai	Haikou
15:00 UTC+8	Wang Ziming 31', 51'; Zhang Yuning 63' (pen.)	Report		Stadium: Wuyuan River Stadium Outer Field No.2; Referee: Du Jianxin

23 December 2022 32	Guangzhou	1–3	Beijing Guoan	Jinjiang
15:00 UTC+8	Ling Jie 9' (pen.)	Report	Yan Yu 32'; Duan Dezhi 34'; Zhang Yuning 42'; Tian Yuda (red card) 75'	Stadium: Jinjiang Sports Center Stadium; Referee: Ma Ning

27 December 2022 33	Beijing Guoan	0–3; Awarded	Shanghai Port	Rizhao
15:00 UTC+8		Report		Stadium: Rizhao International Football Center

31 December 2022 34	Shandong Taishan	3–0; Awarded	Beijing Guoan	Jinjiang
15:00 UTC+8		Report		Stadium: Jinjiang Sports Center Stadium

=== Chinese FA Cup ===
17 November 2022 Second round	Beijing Guoan	2–2 (3–5 p)	Jingchuan Wenhui	Rizhao
15:30 UTC+8	Liu Guobo 35'; Cao Yongjing 54' (pen.)	Report	Du Zexin 4', (yellow card) 45'; Cui Tonghui (yellow card) 53'; Liu Jianxin 70'	Stadium: Rizhao International Football Center; Referee: Qiu Zhaojun
	Penalties
	Wang Ziming (penalty scored); Chen Yanpu (penalty scored); Gao Tianyi (penalty scored); Jin Taiyan (penalty missed)		(penalty scored) Cui Tonghui; (penalty scored) Ilaldin Abdugheni; (penalty scored) Li Jiajun; (penalty scored) Liu Jianxin; (penalty scored) Ma Dongnan

== Statistics ==
=== Appearances and goals ===
No.	Pos.	Nat.	Name	Chinese Super League		Chinese FA Cup		Total	
No.	Pos.	Nat.	Name	Apps	Goals	Apps	Goals	Apps	Goals
1	GK	(China)	Hou Sen	20(2)	0	0	0	20(2)	0
3	DF	(China)	Yu Yang	8(2)	0	1	0	9(2)	0
5	DF	(Bosnia and Herzegovina)	Samir Memišević	28	3	0	0	28	3
6	MF	(China)	Chi Zhongguo	25	0	0	0	25	0
7	MF	(China)	Hou Yongyong	0(1)	0	0	0	0(1)	0
8	MF	(China)	Piao Cheng	3(5)	0	0	0	3(5)	0
9	FW	(China)	Zhang Yuning	30	19	0	0	30	19
10	MF	(China)	Zhang Xizhe	25(5)	5	0	0	25(5)	5
11	FW	(Nigeria)	Samuel Adegbenro	11(3)	3	0	0	11(3)	3
14	GK	(China)	Zou Dehai	11	0	0	0	11	0
15	MF	(China)	Gao Tianyi	18(7)	3	0(1)	0	18(8)	3
16	DF	(China)	Jin Pengxiang	3(1)	1	0	0	3(1)	1
17	DF	(South Korea)	Kang Sang-woo	29(2)	4	0	0	29(2)	4
18	DF	(China)	Jin Taiyan	0(3)	0	1	0	1(3)	0
19	DF	(China)	Liu Huan	13(7)	1	0	0	13(7)	1
20	FW	(China)	Wang Ziming	9(16)	5	0(1)	0	9(17)	5
22	DF	(China)	Yu Dabao	23(2)	3	0	0	23(2)	3
25	GK	(China)	Guo Quanbo	1	0	1	0	2	0
26	DF	(China)	Bai Yang	9(8)	0	1	0	10(8)	0
27	DF	(China)	Wang Gang	27	2	0	0	27	2
28	MF	(China)	Zhang Chengdong	13(8)	0	1	0	14(8)	0
29	FW	(China)	Tian Yuda	1(3)	0	1	0	2(3)	0
30	FW	(Croatia)	Marko Dabro	12(5)	1	0	0	12(5)	1
32	MF	(China)	Liu Guobo	3(6)	0	1	1	4(6)	1
33	GK	(China)	Ma Kunyue	0	0	0	0	0	0
34	MF	(China)	Nebijan Muhmet	13(5)	0	0	0	13(5)	0
35	MF	(China)	Chen Yanpu	0(3)	0	0(1)	0	0(4)	0
36	DF	(China)	Liang Shaowen	4(3)	0	1	0	5(3)	0
37	MF	(China)	Cao Yongjing	4(15)	1	1	0	5(15)	1
38	DF	(China)	Ruan Qilong	2(2)	2	1	0	3(2)	2
40	FW	(China)	Gao Jian	0(1)	0	0	0	0(1)	0
43	MF	(China)	Shi Yucheng	0(1)	0	1	0	1(1)	0
53	DF	(China)	Ling Zhongyang	1	0	0	0	1	0
54	DF	(China)	Xu Dongdong	1	0	0	0	1	0
56	MF	(China)	Hu Jiaqi	1	0	0	0	1	0
61	MF	(China)	Lyu Jiarui	0(1)	0	0	0	0(1)	0
63	MF	(China)	An Yongjian	0(1)	0	0	0	0(1)	0
66	MF	(China)	Yan Yu	1	1	0	0	1	1
68	DF	(China)	He Xiaoqiang	1	0	0	0	1	0
69	FW	(China)	Duan Dezhi	1	1	0	0	1	1
Players have left the club or were not registered after the summer transfer window
23	MF	(China)	Li Ke	0	0	0	0	0	0
31	FW	(China)	Li Boxi	1	0	0	0	1	0
39	MF	(China)	Xie Longfei	0	0	0	0	0	0
41	FW	(China)	Leng Jixuan	0(1)	0	0	0	0(1)	0

=== Goals ===
Rank	Position	Name	Chinese Super League	Chinese FA Cup	Total
1	FW	(China) Zhang Yuning	19	0	19
2	FW	(China) Wang Ziming	5	0	5
2	MF	(China) Zhang Xizhe	5	0	5
4	DF	(South Korea) Kang Sang-woo	4	0	4
5	MF	(Nigeria) Samuel Adegbenro	3	0	3
5	MF	(China) Gao Tianyi	3	0	3
5	MF	(Bosnia and Herzegovina) Samir Memišević	3	0	3
5	DF	(China) Yu Dabao	3	0	3
9	MF	(China) Cao Yongjing	1	1	2
9	DF	(China) Ruan Qilong	2	0	2
9	DF	(China) Wang Gang	2	0	2
12	FW	(Croatia) Marko Dabro	1	0	1
12	DF	(China) Jin Pengxiang	1	0	1
12	DF	(China) Liu Huan	1	0	1
12	MF	(China) Liu Guobo	0	1	1
12	MF	(China) Yan Yu	1	0	1
12	MF	(China) Duan Dezhi	1	0	1
Own Goal			2	0	2
Total			57	2	59

=== Assists ===
Rank	Position	Name	Chinese Super League	Chinese FA Cup	Total
1	DF	(South Korea) Kang Sang-woo	7	0	7
1	MF	(China) Zhang Xizhe	7	0	7
3	MF	(China) Gao Tianyi	5	0	5
4	MF	(Bosnia and Herzegovina) Samir Memišević	4	0	4
4	FW	(China) Zhang Yuning	4	0	4
6	DF	(China) Wang Gang	3	0	3
7	FW	(Croatia) Marko Dabro	2	0	2
7	MF	(China) Nebijan Muhmet	2	0	2
9	FW	(Nigeria) Samuel Adegbenro	1	0	1
9	MF	(China) Cao Yongjing	1	0	1
9	MF	(China) Chi Zhongguo	1	0	1
9	MF	(China) Hu Jiaqi	1	0	1
9	MF	(China) Liu Guobo	1	0	1
9	DF	(China) Ruan Qilong	0	1	1
9	FW	(China) Tian Yuda	1	0	1
9	FW	(China) Wang Ziming	1	0	1
9	DF	(China) He Xiaoqiang	1	0	1
Total			42	1	43

=== Clean sheets ===
Rank	Name	Chinese Super League	Chinese FA Cup	Total
1	(China) Hou Sen	5(1)	0	5(1)
2	(China) Zou Dehai	3	0	3
Total		8	0	8

Numbers in parentheses represent games where both goalkeepers participated and both kept a clean sheet; the number in parentheses is awarded to the goalkeeper who was substituted on, whilst a full clean sheet is awarded to the goalkeeper who was on the field at the start of play.

=== Disciplinary record ===
N	P	Nat.	Name	Chinese Super League			Chinese FA Cup			Total			Notes
N	P	Nat.	Name	Yellow card	Second yellow card	Red card	Yellow card	Second yellow card	Red card	Yellow card	Second yellow card	Red card	Notes
28	MF	(China)	Zhang Chengdong	4		1				4		1	
5	DF	(Bosnia and Herzegovina)	Samir Memišević	7						7			
36	DF	(China)	Liang Shaowen	1						1			
27	DF	(China)	Wang Gang	4						4			
9	FW	(China)	Zhang Yuning	2						2			
22	DF	(China)	Yu Dabao	7		1				7		1	
15	MF	(China)	Gao Tianyi	3						3			
32	MF	(China)	Liu Guobo	1						1			
14	GK	(China)	Zou Dehai	2						2			
3	DF	(China)	Yu Yang	2						2			
1	GK	(China)	Hou Sen	2						2			
6	MF	(China)	Chi Zhongguo	4						4			
37	MF	(China)	Cao Yongjing	1						1			
34	DF	(China)	Nebijan Muhmet	1						1			
29	FW	(China)	Tian Yuda	1		1				1		1	
11	FW	(Nigeria)	Samuel Adegbenro	1						1			
19	DF	(China)	Liu Huan	1						1			
20	FW	(China)	Wang Ziming	1						1			
10	MF	(China)	Zhang Xizhe	2						2			
17	DF	(South Korea)	Kang Sang-woo	1						1			

Last updated: 23 December 2022
Only competitive matches
(yellow card) = Number of bookings; (second yellow card) = Number of sending offs after a second yellow card; (red card) = Number of sending offs by a direct red card.
