= 2024 Changchun Yatai F.C. season =

Changchun Yatai F.C.
2024 season
- Manager: Chen Yang (until 17 April); Xie Hui (from 17 April)
- Stadium: Changchun Stadium
- Super League: 16th
- FA Cup: Third round

The 2024 Changchun Yatai F.C. season is Changchun's 29th season in existence and 4th consecutive season in the Chinese Super League. Changchun will also be competing in the Chinese FA Cup. Changchun Yatai drew an average home attendance of 13,612 in the 2024 edition of the CSL.

== Events ==
On 17 April 2024, manager Chen Yang resigned as the team sat bottom of the table after four consecutive defeats. Former Chinese international footballer and Dalian Professional manager Xie Hui replaced him on the same day.

== Players ==
=== First team squad ===
As of 25 February 2024

Note: Flags indicate national team as defined under FIFA eligibility rules; some limited exceptions apply. Players may hold more than one non-FIFA nationality.

No.	Pos.	Nation	Player
2	DF	CHN	Abduhamit Abdugheni
3	DF	CHN	Wang Yaopeng
4	DF	SRB	Lazar Rosić
5	DF	CHN	Li Shenyuan (on loan from Shanghai Port)
6	MF	CHN	Zhang Huachen
7	MF	CHN	Liu Yun
8	MF	CHN	Wang Jinxian
9	FW	SVN	Robert Berić
10	MF	BRA	Serginho (captain)
13	FW	CHN	Cheng Changcheng
14	GK	CHN	Yang Xinyang
15	FW	CHN	Tian Yuda
19	DF	CHN	Liao Chengjian
20	MF	CHN	Zhang Yufeng
21	DF	CHN	Cui Qi
23	GK	CHN	Wu Yake
24	DF	CHN	Yan Zhiyu

No.	Pos.	Nation	Player
25	FW	CHN	He Zhenyu
26	DF	CHN	Yuan Mincheng
28	GK	CHN	Wang Zhifeng
29	FW	CHN	Tan Long
30	MF	CHN	Sabit Abdusalam
32	DF	CHN	Sun Guoliang
33	MF	CHN	Feng Shuaihang
34	DF	CHN	He Yiran
35	MF	CHN	Wang Yu
37	DF	CHN	Jing Boxi
38	MF	CHN	Liu Junbo
39	DF	CHN	Zhao Xiaolong
40	MF	BRA	Guilherme
42	GK	CHN	Zou Dehai
43	DF	CHN	Wu Junjie
44	MF	AUT	Peter Žulj
45	FW	CHN	Wei Feng

== Transfers ==
=== In ===
Date	Pos	Player	Transferred from	Fee	Ref
7 February 2024	CF	(Slovenia) Robert Berić	(China) Tianjin Jinmen Tiger	Free Transfer	
7 February 2024	AM	(Brazil) Guilherme	(Brazil) Goiás	Free Transfer	
7 February 2024	CB	(Serbia) Lazar Rosić	(Serbia) FK Vojvodina	Free Transfer	
7 February 2024	CB	(China) Sun Guoliang	(China) Nanjing City	Free Transfer	
7 February 2024	CB	(China) Wang Yaopeng	(China) Dalian Pro	Free Transfer	
7 February 2024	CM	(China) Wang Yu	(China) Dalian Pro	Free Transfer	
25 February 2024	GK	(China) Zou Dehai	(China) Beijing Guoan	Free Transfer	
25 February 2024	CM	(China) Zhang Huachen	(China) Shanghai Port	Free Transfer	
25 February 2024	CF	(China) Tian Yuda	(China) Beijing Guoan	Free Transfer	

=== Out ===
Date	Pos	Player	Transferred to	Fee	Ref
1 January 2024	CM	(China) Zhang Li	Retirement	Released	
1 January 2024	CB	(Denmark) Jores Okore	Free Agent	Released	
4 January 2024	CF	(Serbia) Nenad Lukić	(Hungary) Győri ETO	Free Transfer	
26 January 2024	CB	(China) Bi Jinhao	(China) Shandong Taishan	Free Transfer	
21 February 2024	CB	(China) Yi Teng	(China) Yunnan Yukun	Free Transfer	
29 February 2024	LB	(China) Li Hong	(China) Cangzhou Mighty Lions	Free Transfer	

=== Loaned in ===
Date	Pos	Player	Loaned from	Until	Ref
25 February 2024	RB	(China) Li Shenyuan	(China) Shanghai Port	End of Season	

=== Loaned out ===
Date	Pos	Player	Loaned to	Until	Ref
20 February 2024	GK	(China) Lu Ning	(China) Heilongjiang Ice City	End of Season	
27 February 2024	CB	(China) Sun Jie	(China) Qingdao West Coast	End of Season	
29 February 2024	CM	(China) Dilyimit Tudi	(China) Cangzhou Mighty Lions	End of Season	

== Competitions ==
=== Chinese Super League ===
==== League table ====
Pos	Team	Pld	W	D	L	GF	GA	GD	Pts
7	Zhejiang	30	11	5	14	55	60	−5	38
8	Henan	30	9	9	12	34	39	−5	36
9	Changchun Yatai	30	8	8	14	46	58	−12	32 (Note: Changchun Yatai are ahead of Qingdao West Coast on head-to-head points: Changchun Yatai 4, Qingdao West Coast 1)
10	Qingdao West Coast	30	8	8	14	41	58	−17	32
11	Wuhan Three Towns	30	8	7	15	31	44	−13	31

Source: Soccerway
Rules for classification:
- During season: 1) Points; 2) Head-to-head points; 3) Head-to-head goal difference; 4) Head-to-head goals scored; 5) Goal difference; 6) Goals scored; 7) Rankings in the previous season. (Rules 2 to 4 are only applied when teams concerned have finished both/all the matches against others.)
- After season: 1) Points; 2) Head-to-head points; 3) Head-to-head goal difference; 4) Head-to-head goals scored; 5) Goal difference; 6) Goals scored; 7) Disciplinary points (yellow card = 1 point, red card = 3 points); 8) Drawing of lots.
  Notes:

=== Results summary ===
Overall								Home						Away					
Pld	W	D	L	GF	GA	GD	Pts	W	D	L	GF	GA	GD	W	D	L	GF	GA	GD
6	1	0	5	5	11	−6	3	0	0	3	2	5	−3	1	0	2	3	6	−3

Last updated: 2 March 2024.
Source: See Results

=== Results ===
1 March 2024 1	Shandong Taishan	4–2	Changchun Yatai	Jinan
18:00 (UTC+8)	Cryzan 3'; Pato 42'; Jadson 45+7'; Qazaishvili 61'		Berić 81'; Tan Long 90+3'	Stadium: Jinan Olympic Sports Center Stadium; Attendance: 20,627; Referee: Zhang Lei

8 March 2024 2	Qingdao Hainiu	0–1	Changchun Yatai	Qingdao
19:35 (UTC+8)			Guilherme 61'	Stadium: Qingdao Youth Football Stadium; Attendance: 21,267; Referee: Wang Di

31 March 2024 3	Changchun Yatai	0–1	Tianjin Jinmen Tiger	Changchun
15:30 (UTC+8)			Compagno 44' (pen.)	Stadium: Changchun Stadium; Attendance: 15,029; Referee: Ma Ning

5 April 2024 4	Changchun Yatai	1–2	Shanghai Shenhua	Changchun
15:30 (UTC+8)	Tan Long 37'		Jiang Shenglong 25'; Teixeira 90+9'	Stadium: Changchun Stadium; Attendance: 13,790; Referee: Tang Shunqi

10 April 2024 5	Cangzhou Mighty Lions	2–0	Changchun Yatai	Cangzhou
19:35 (UTC+8)	Oscar 43'; Sunzu 47'		Abduhamit Abdugheni (red card) 15'	Stadium: Cangzhou Stadium; Attendance: 8,699; Referee: Shan Dan'ao

14 April 2024 6	Changchun Yatai	1–2	Chengdu Rongcheng	Changchun
15:30 (UTC+8)	Guilherme 12'; Berić (yellow card) 64' (yellow-red card) 90+7'		Felipe 90+4'; Wei Shihao 90+18'	Stadium: Changchun Stadium; Attendance: 13,094; Referee: Zhang Lei
