= Jiang Wenhao (footballer) =

Chinese association football player

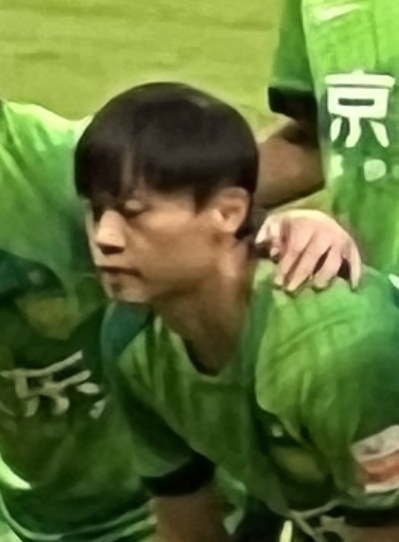
- Jiang Wenhao in July 2023

Personal information
- Date of birth: 16 January 2000 (age 26)
- Place of birth: Jingdezhen, Jiangxi, China
- Height: 1.76 m (5 ft 9 in)
- Positions: Midfielder; left-back

Team information
- Current team: Shaanxi Union (on loan from Beijing Guoan)
- Number: 27

Youth career
- –2020: Beijing Guoan

Senior career*
| Years | Team | Apps | (Gls) |
| 2020– | Beijing Guoan | 13 | (0) |
| 2022 | → Guangxi Pingguo Haliao (loan) | 10 | (0) |
| 2024 | → Changchun Yatai (loan) | 5 | (0) |
| 2026– | → Shaanxi Union (loan) | 0 | (0) |
- * Club domestic league appearances and goals as of 20 August 2025

Jiang Wenhao (Chinese: 江文豪; born 16 January 2000) is a Chinese footballer currently playing as a midfielder or left-back for Shaanxi Union, on loan from Beijing Guoan.

== Career ==
Jiang Wenhao was promoted to the senior team of Beijing Guoan within the 2020 Chinese Super League season. He would make his debut in a Chinese FA Cup game on 28 November 2020 against Chengdu Better City in a 1–0 victory.

He was given an opportunity to participate in senior games when he was part of the AFC Champions League squad, which was a mix of reserves and youth players to participate within centralized venues while the clubs senior players were still dealing with self-isolating measures due to COVID-19. He made his continental debut in an AFC Champions League game on 26 June 2021 against United City F.C. in a 1–1 draw. In the 2–3 reverse fixture loss on 8 July 2021, Jiang scored his first senior goal inside the first minute, dispossessing a United City player in midfield and breaking forward then taking a shot from just inside the area that bounced off Anthony Pinthus’ post and into the net. It was Guoan's fastest ever goal in the AFC Champions League.

The following campaign in 2022 league season he would be loaned out second-tier club Guangxi Pingguo Haliao on 17 August 2022. He made his first appearance for them in a league game on 18 August 2022 against Beijing Sport University in a 2–1 victory.

Jiang returned to Guoan ahead of the 2023 season. He made his league debut for the club on 23 May 2023 in a 6–2 victory against Cangzhou Mighty Lions, coming on as a substitute in the 84th minute for Wang Ziming. Jiang's role became more significant as the season progressed, playing 9 matches in a span of 10 games between July and August 2023, including starting in the match against rivals Shanghai Shenhua. However, he suffered a head injury only 15 minutes in the game, and required stitches. He featured only once after the injury in the 2023 season.

Jiang had limited opportunities in the first half of the 2024 season with Guoan, appearing in only 3 games. He was loaned out to fellow Chinese Super League club Changchun Yatai in July 2024 as he searched for more minutes. At Changchun, Jiang took part in 6 games across league and cup, and returned to Guoan after the season concluded.

In January 2025, ahead of the 2025 season, Jiang suffered an anterior cruciate ligament injury on his left knee in a training match against Chongqing Tonglianglong. This was his second ACL injury on the same knee, with the first such injury occurring 7 years prior. He was expected to recover in 6 months. Jiang returned from injury in style on 20 August 2025. He came on as a substitute in Guoan's Chinese FA Cup semi-final against Yunnan Yukun in the 69th minute and scored a left-footed stunner from outside the box with his first touch, extending the Guoan lead to 5–0 in a 7–0 victory.

On 3 July 2026, Jiang was loaned to China League One side Shaanxi Union for the rest of 2026 season.

== Career statistics ==
As of 20 August 2025.

| Club | Season | League | | | Cup | | Continental | | Other | | Total | |
| Club | Season | Division | Apps | Goals | Apps | Goals | Apps | Goals | Apps | Goals | Apps | Goals |
|---|---|---|---|---|---|---|---|---|---|---|---|---|
| Beijing Guoan | 2020 | Chinese Super League | 0 | 0 | 2 | 0 | 0 | 0 | – | | 2 | 0 |
| Beijing Guoan | 2021 | Chinese Super League | 0 | 0 | 0 | 0 | 5 (Note: Appearances in the AFC Champions League) | 1 | – | | 5 | 1 |
| Beijing Guoan | 2023 | Chinese Super League | 10 | 0 | 2 | 0 | – | | – | | 12 | 0 |
| Beijing Guoan | 2024 | Chinese Super League | 3 | 0 | 0 | 0 | – | | – | | 3 | 0 |
| Beijing Guoan | 2025 | Chinese Super League | 0 | 0 | 1 | 1 | 0 | 0 | – | | 1 | 1 |
| Beijing Guoan | Total | | 13 | 0 | 5 | 1 | 5 | 1 | 0 | 0 | 23 | 2 |
| Guangxi Pingguo Haliao (loan) | 2022 | China League One | 10 | 0 | 2 | 0 | – | | – | | 12 | 0 |
| Changchun Yatai (loan) | 2024 | Chinese Super League | 5 | 0 | 1 | 0 | – | | – | | 6 | 0 |
| Career total | | | 28 | 0 | 8 | 1 | 5 | 1 | 0 | 0 | 41 | 2 |

== Honours ==
Beijing Guoan

- Chinese FA Cup: 2025
- Chinese FA Super Cup: 2026
