= Jiang Wenhao =

Jiang Wenhao may refer to:

- Jiang Wenhao (footballer), Chinese footballer
- Jiang Wenhao (wrestler), Chinese Greco-Roman wrestler.
