= Marko Dabro =

Croatian footballer (born 1997)

Personal information
- Date of birth: 28 March 1997 (age 29)
- Place of birth: Vinkovci, Croatia
- Height: 1.78 m (5 ft 10 in)
- Position: Forward

Team information
- Current team: Slaven Belupo
- Number: 7

Youth career
- 2006–2013: Cibalia
- 2013–2016: Fiorentina

Senior career*
Years	Team	Apps	(Gls)
2013	Cibalia	4	(0)
2016	→ Cibalia (loan)	13	(3)
2016–2018	Cibalia	41	(5)
2018	Gorica	3	(0)
2019	Bravo	12	(6)
2019–2021	Bijelo Brdo	49	(40)
2021–2022	Lokomotiva	27	(13)
2022–2023	Beijing Guoan	17	(1)
2023	→ Riga (loan)	11	(9)
2024–2026	Varaždin	57	(4)
2026–	Slaven Belupo	13	(3)

International career
2011	Croatia U14	2	(1)
2010–2012	Croatia U15	6	(5)
2012	Croatia U16	13	(4)
2012–2013	Croatia U17	8	(1)
2014	Croatia U18	1	(0)
2014–2015	Croatia U19	3	(0)
2018	Croatia U20	1	(5)
- * Club domestic league appearances and goals as of 15 June 2026

Marko Dabro (born 28 March 1997) is a Croatian professional footballer who plays as a forward for Croatian Football League club Slaven Belupo.

== Club career ==
Born in Vinkovci, Dabro went through the ranks of his hometown club HNK Cibalia, becoming a part of the Croatian youth national teams early as 2010, debuting as a 13-year old for the national U15 team. On March 30, 2013, he became the youngest player to debut in the Prva HNL, aged 16 years and 2 days, coming in from the bench in the 78th minute during the 1–0 away loss vs. RNK Split for Tomislav Mazalović.

In the summer of 2013 Dabro joined the youth ranks of the Italian giants ACF Fiorentina for an alleged sum of 1 million Euros. Not breaking through to Fiorentina's senior team, he was loaned back to HNK Cibalia in January 2016, rejoining the club permanently in the summer of 2016.

Following Cibalia's relegation, Dabro moved in the summer of 2018 to Gorica, but left the club in December of the same year, having made just three league caps for the team.

In 2019, he then joined NK Bravo.

In April 2022, Dabro joined Chinese Super League club Beijing Guoan.

In February 2023, Dabro joined Latvian Higher League club Riga on loan.

On 14 February 2024, Dabro returned to his home country to join NK Varaždin.

== International career ==
Dabro was a member of each Croatian youth national football team from U-14 to U-20 level, having debuted for the U-15 national team as a 13-year old in 2010.

== Career statistics ==
As of match played 25 October 2025

Appearances and goals by club, season and competition
Club	Season	League			National cup		Continental		Total	
Club	Season	Division	Apps	Goals	Apps	Goals	Apps	Goals	Apps	Goals
Cibalia	2012–13	1. HNL	4	0	0	0	—		4	0
Cibalia (loan)	2015–16	1. HNL	13	3	—		—		13	3
Cibalia	2016–17	1. HNL	13	1	2	1	—		15	2
Cibalia	2017–18	1. HNL	28	4	1	1	—		29	5
Cibalia	Total		54	8	3	2	—		57	10
Gorica	2018–19	1. HNL	3	0	—		—		3	0
Bravo	2018–19	Slovenian Second League	11	6	—		—		11	6
Bravo	2019–20	Slovenian PrvaLiga	1	0	—		—		1	0
Bravo	Total		12	6	—		—		12	6
Bijelo Brdo	2019–20	2. HNL	17	10	3	1	—		20	11
Bijelo Brdo	2020–21	2. HNL	32	30	1	0	—		33	30
Bijelo Brdo	Total		49	40	4	1	—		53	41
Lokomotiva	2021–22	1. HNL	27	13	3	1	—		30	14
Beijing Guoan	2022	Chinese Super League	17	1	0	0	—		17	1
Riga (loan)	2023	Virslīga	11	2	—		—		11	2
Varaždin	2023–24	HNL	15	3	0	0	—		15	3
Varaždin	2024–25	HNL	34	1	2	2	—		36	3
Varaždin	2025–26	HNL	8	0	1	1	2	1	11	2
Varaždin	Total		57	4	3	3	2	1	62	8
Career total			234	74	13	7	2	1	249	82
