= Wang Gang (footballer) =

Chinese footballer

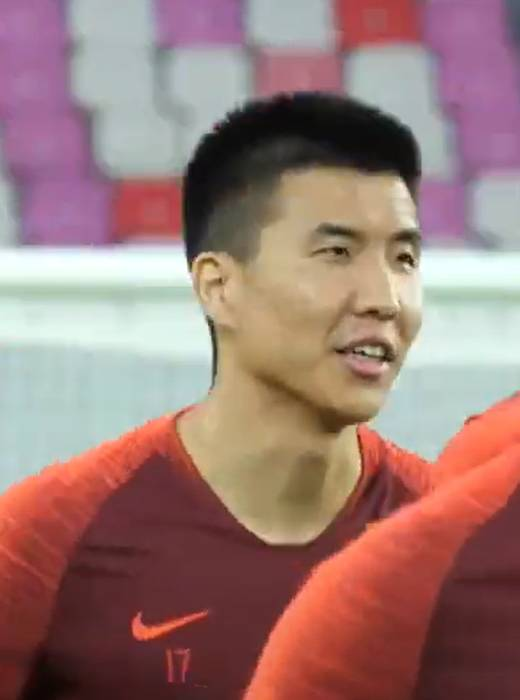
- Wang Gang in September 2019

Personal information
- Full name: Wang Gang
- Date of birth: 17 February 1989 (age 37)
- Place of birth: Tianjin, China
- Height: 1.87 m (6 ft 1 1/2 in)
- Positions: Striker; right winger; right-back

Team information
- Current team: Beijing Guoan
- Number: 27

Youth career
- 1999–2007: Tianjin Locomotive
- 2007–2008: Benfica

Senior career*
Years	Team	Apps	(Gls)
2008–2009	Chaves	22	(3)
2009–2011	Beira-Mar	40	(5)
2011–2014	Shandong Luneng	19	(0)
2011	→ Covilhã (loan)	13	(1)
2015	Sacavenense	1	(0)
2015–2018	Beijing Renhe	83	(8)
2019–	Beijing Guoan	168	(3)

International career^{‡}
2019–	China	12	(0)
Medal record
Representing China
Men's football
AFC U-17 Championship
Gold medal – first place	2004 Japan	Team
- * Club domestic league appearances and goals as of 19 November 2026 ‡ National team caps and goals as of 16 November 2021

Wang Gang (simplified Chinese: 王刚; traditional Chinese: 王剛; pinyin: Wáng Gāng; born 17 February 1989 in Tianjin) is a Chinese professional footballer who currently plays at right-back for Chinese Super League club Beijing Guoan.

== Club career ==
Wang Gang began his football career with the Tianjin Locomotive youth teams before being called up to the Chinese U17 team where he was part of the squad that won the 2004 AFC U-17 Championship. This was followed with inclusion in the team that participated in the 2005 FIFA U-17 World Championship. After the tournament he would sign for Portuguese club S.L. Benfica initially for one year with the option of a further three. At Benfica he would play for their youth team before he moved to third-tier club Chaves.

Wang transferred to S.C. Beira-Mar in 2009. He played 26 games during the 2009–10 season, and was a substitute for 24 of the 26 matches he played in, which was the record in 2009-10 season. Wang returned to China to play for Shandong Luneng, but was immediately sent on loan to S.C. Covilhã of the Portuguese Segunda Liga. He returned to Shandong after playing thirteen games for S.C. Covilhã, scoring one goal.

On his return to Shandong he was unable to establish himself within the team and on 4 February 2015 he transferred to third tier Portuguese club S.G. Sacavenense. After only one game he returned to China to join top-tier club Guizhou Renhe on 25 June 2015. He went on to make his debut on 27 June 2015, in a league game against Liaoning Whowin in a 2–1 defeat where he also scored his first goal for the club. Unfortunately he would be a member of the team that was relegated at the end of the 2015 Chinese Super League season. He would remain loyal towards the club as they moved locations, renamed themselves Beijing Renhe and gained promotion back into the top tier at the end of the 2016 league season.

=== Beijing Guoan ===
On 25 February 2019, Wang transferred to Chinese Super League club Beijing Sinobo Guoan. On 1 March 2019, Wang made his debut for Guoan in the opening league game of the season against Wuhan Zall in a 1–0 victory. On 11 July 2022, Wang scored his first goal for the club in a 2–1 defeat against Shenzhen F.C.

== International career ==
Wang Gang was called up to and made his first appearance for these China's national football team on 3 March 2010, in a friendly match against Portugal, however, the game was not recognised by FIFA. On 21 March 2019, Wang made his debut for the Chinese national team in a 1–0 loss against Thailand in the 2019 China Cup.

== Career statistics ==
=== Club statistics ===
Statistics accurate as of match played 2 November 2024.

Appearances and goals by club, season and competition
Club	Season	League			National Cup		League Cup		Continental		Other		Total	
Club	Season	Division	Apps	Goals	Apps	Goals	Apps	Goals	Apps	Goals	Apps	Goals	Apps	Goals
G.D. Chaves	2008-09	Portuguese Second Division	22	3	0	0	0	0	-		-		22	3
S.C. Beira-Mar	2009-10	Liga de Honra	26	4	4	0	4	0	-		-		34	4
S.C. Beira-Mar	2010-11	Primeira Liga	14	1	0	0	2	0	-		-		16	1
S.C. Beira-Mar	Total		40	5	4	0	6	0	0	0	0	0	50	5
Shandong Luneng	2012	Chinese Super League	4	0	0	0	-		-		-		4	0
Shandong Luneng	2013	Chinese Super League	14	0	2	1	-		-		-		16	1
Shandong Luneng	2014	Chinese Super League	1	0	0	0	-		0	0	-		1	0
Shandong Luneng	Total		19	0	2	1	0	0	0	0	0	0	21	1
S.C. Covilhã (loan)	2011-12	Liga de Honra	13	1	2	0	0	0	-		-		15	1
S.G. Sacavenense	2014-15	Campeonato Nacional	1	0	0	0	0	0	-		-		1	0
Guizhou Renhe/ Beijing Renhe	2015	Chinese Super League	11	2	1	0	-		-		-		12	2
Guizhou Renhe/ Beijing Renhe	2016	China League One	29	3	0	0	-		-		-		29	3
Guizhou Renhe/ Beijing Renhe	2017	China League One	18	2	1	0	-		-		-		19	2
Guizhou Renhe/ Beijing Renhe	2018	Chinese Super League	25	1	1	0	-		-		-		26	1
Guizhou Renhe/ Beijing Renhe	Total		83	8	3	0	0	0	0	0	0	0	86	8
Beijing Guoan	2019	Chinese Super League	25	0	2	0	-		5	0	0 (Note: Appearance in Chinese FA Super Cup)	0	32	0
Beijing Guoan	2020	Chinese Super League	18	0	1	0	-		6	0	-		25	0
Beijing Guoan	2021	Chinese Super League	12	0	0	0	-		0	0	-		12	0
Beijing Guoan	2022	Chinese Super League	27	2	0	0	-		-		-		27	2
Beijing Guoan	2023	Chinese Super League	21	1	1	0	-		-		-		22	1
Beijing Guoan	2024	Chinese Super League	18	0	2	0	-		-		-		20	2
Beijing Guoan	Total		121	3	6	0	0	0	11	0	0	0	138	3
Career Total			299	20	17	1	6	0	11	0	0	0	333	21

=== International statistics ===
National team
Year	Apps	Goals
2019	8	0
2020	0	0
2021	4	0
Total	12	0

== Honours ==
=== Club ===
Beira-Mar

- Liga de Honra: 2009–10

Shandong Luneng Taishan

- Chinese FA Cup: 2014

Beijing Guoan

- Chinese FA Cup: 2025
- Chinese FA Super Cup: 2026

=== International ===
China U-17

- AFC U-17 Championship: 2004
