= Ruan Qilong =

Chinese association football player

Personal information
- Date of birth: 2 January 2001 (age 25)
- Place of birth: Ningde, Fujian, China
- Height: 1.81 m (5 ft 11 in)
- Position: Defender

Team information
- Current team: Chongqing Tonglianglong
- Number: 38

Youth career
- 2016–2019: Fujian Football Association
- 2019–2020: Beijing Guoan

Senior career*
Years	Team	Apps	(Gls)
2020–2024	Beijing Guoan	7	(2)
2020	→ China U19 (loan)	8	(0)
2021	→ China U20 (loan)	8	(0)
2024	→ Liaoning Tieren (loan)	12	(1)
2025–	Chongqing Tonglianglong	51	(4)

International career^{‡}
2019	China U18	2	(0)
2023–2024	China U23	1	(0)
- * Club domestic league appearances and goals as of 19 November 2026 ‡ National team caps and goals as of 14:01, 26 June 2021 (UTC)

Ruan Qilong (Chinese: 阮奇龙; born 2 January 2001) is a Chinese footballer currently playing as a defender for Chongqing Tonglianglong.

== Club career ==
Ruan Qilong would play for the Fujian Football Association youth team initially as a goalkeeper before being transformed into a defender and attracting the attentions of the Chinese U18 team. On 9 March 2019 he moved to his boyhood supported football club Beijing Guoan, where he would play for their youth team. To gain more playing time he would be loaned out to the China U19 team who were allowed to take part in the third tier of the Chinese pyramid.

On his return in June 2021, despite not having registered a single league appearance with the Beijing's first team, he would be given an opportunity to participate within senior games when he was part of the AFC Champions League squad, which was a mix of reserves and youth players to participate within centralized venues while the clubs senior players were still dealing with self-isolating measures due to COVID-19. He would make his continental debut in an AFC Champions League game on 26 June 2021 against United City F.C. in a 1–1 draw.

After his return from the continental competition he would go on to make his league debut on 29 December 2021 against Shandong Taishan F.C. in a 1–1 draw. The following season would see him score his first goals for the club in a league game against Hebei F.C. on 10 December 2022 in a 4–0 victory.

Ahead of the 2023 season in a friendly match against Tianjin Jinmen Tigers on 31 March 2023, Ruan suffered a foot injury that saw him sidelined for extensive periods that season. He returned from injury on 22 November 2023 in a China U23 match against Tajikistan, although he said that he was still feeling his injuries. He did not feature in the 2023 season for Beijing Guoan.

Ruan left Guoan on loan in July 2024 to join China League One club Liaoning Tieren as he could not secure a spot in Guoan's rotation. He scored his first and only goal on loan in a 5–1 league win against Nanjing City on 17 August 2024. He capped for Liaoning a total of 12 times in the season.

On 18 January 2025, Ruan completed his permanent transfer from Beijing Guoan to China League One club Chongqing Tonglianglong.

== Career statistics ==
As of 28 January 2025

Club	Season	League			Cup		Continental		Other		Total	
Club	Season	Division	Apps	Goals	Apps	Goals	Apps	Goals	Apps	Goals	Apps	Goals
Beijing Guoan	2020	Chinese Super League	0	0	0	0	0	0	-		0	0
Beijing Guoan	2021	Chinese Super League	3	0	1	0	6 (Note: Appearances in the AFC Champions League)	0	-		10	0
Beijing Guoan	2022	Chinese Super League	4	2	1	0	-		-		5	2
Beijing Guoan	2023	Chinese Super League	0	0	0	0	-		-		0	0
Beijing Guoan	2024	Chinese Super League	0	0	0	0	-		-		0	0
Beijing Guoan	Total		7	2	2	0	6	0	0	0	15	2
China U19 (loan)	2020	China League Two	8	0	-		-		-		8	0
China U20 (loan)	2021	China League Two	8	0	0	0	-		-		8	0
Liaoning Tieren (loan)	2024	China League One	12	1	0	0	-		-		12	1
Chongqing Tonglianglong	2025	China League One	0	0	0	0	0	0	0	0	0	0
Career total			35	3	2	0	6	0	0	0	43	3
