= Kang Sang-woo =

South Korean footballer (born 1993)

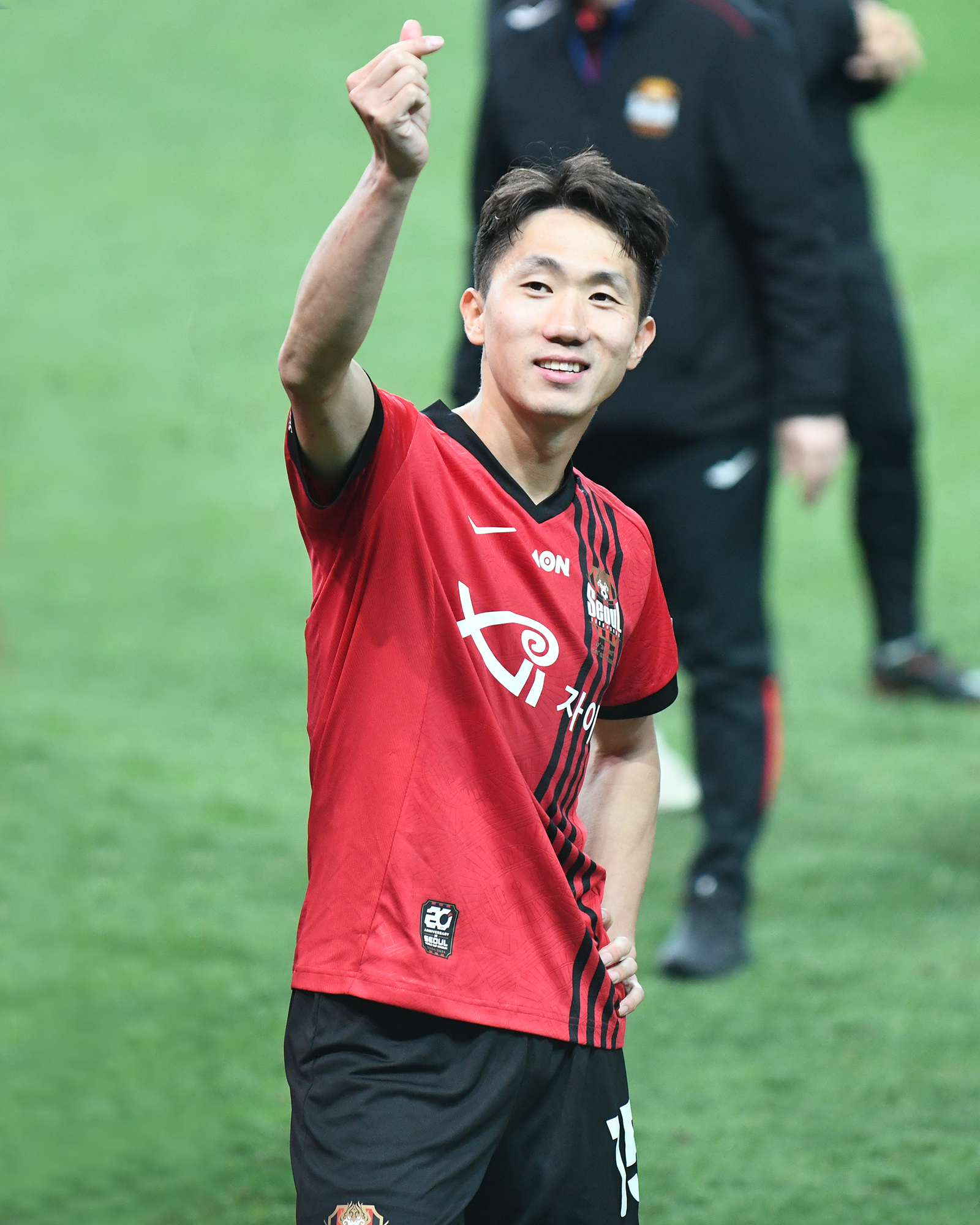
- Kang in 2024

Personal information
- Full name: Kang Sang-woo
- Date of birth: 7 October 1993 (age 33)
- Place of birth: Seoul, South Korea
- Height: 1.74 m (5 ft 9 in)
- Positions: Full-back; winger

Team information
- Current team: Ulsan HD
- Number: 17

Youth career
- –2014: Kyunghee University

Senior career*
Years	Team	Apps	(Gls)
2014–2022	Pohang Steelers	160	(10)
2019–2020	→ Sangju Sangmu (draft)	31	(10)
2022–2023	Beijing Guoan	57	(12)
2024	FC Seoul	35	(1)
2025–	Ulsan HD	43	(1)

International career^{‡}
2011–2013	South Korea U20	20	(4)
2014–2016	South Korea U23	9	(0)
2021–	South Korea	3	(0)
- * Club domestic league appearances and goals as of 3 August 2026 ‡ National team caps and goals as of 12 September 2023

- Kang Sang-woo
- Hangul: 강상우
- Hanja: 姜祥佑
- RR: Gang Sangu
- MR: Kang Sangu

Kang Sang-woo (Korean: 강상우; Hanja: 姜祥佑; born 7 October 1993) is a South Korean professional footballer who plays as a full-back or winger for K League 1 club Ulsan HD.

== Club career ==
Kang joined Pohang Steelers in 2014 as a free agent rookie and go on to make his debut in an AFC Champions League group game on 18 March 2014 against Shandong Luneng Taishan in a 2–2 draw, where he came on as a late substitute. This would be followed by his first starting appearance, which was against Jeju United on 5 July 2014, in a league game that ended in a 0–0 draw. He would become a regular within the team until he was loaned out to Sangju Sangmu, the sports division of the Republic of Korea Armed Forces, as part of his military service.

On 15 April 2022, Kang joined Chinese Super League club Beijing Guoan. He would make his debut on 5 June 2022, in a league game against Cangzhou Mighty Lions that ended in a 2–1 defeat. After his spot on the team was given to Samuel Adegbenro ahead of the 2024 season, his contract was terminated by Guoan on 6 March 2024. He scored 13 goals and provided 12 assists across 59 games in all competitions during his time with the team.

On 7 March 2024, K League 1 club FC Seoul announced the signing of Kang. He was given the number 15 shirt.

On 6 January 2025, Sang-woo joined Ulsan HD.

== International career ==
Kang was a member of the South Korea national under-20 team and represented the team at the 2013 FIFA U-20 World Cup.

He made his debut for South Korea national football team on 9 June 2021 in a World Cup qualifier against Sri Lanka.

== Career statistics ==
=== Club ===
As of match played 9 December 2025

Appearances and goals by club, season and competition
Club	Season	League			National Cup		Continental		Other		Total	
Club	Season	Division	Apps	Goals	Apps	Goals	Apps	Goals	Apps	Goals	Apps	Goals
Pohang Steelers	2014	K League Classic	8	0	0	0	2	0	—		10	0
Pohang Steelers	2015	K League Classic	5	1	0	0	—		—		5	1
Pohang Steelers	2016	K League Classic	30	1	1	0	5	0	—		36	1
Pohang Steelers	2017	K League Classic	33	0	0	0	—		—		33	0
Pohang Steelers	2018	K League 1	36	3	0	0	—		—		36	3
Pohang Steelers	2020	K League 1	10	1	1	0	—		—		11	1
Pohang Steelers	2021	K League 1	37	4	1	1	10	2	—		48	7
Pohang Steelers	2022	K League 1	1	0	0	0	—		—		1	0
Pohang Steelers	Total		160	10	3	1	17	2	—		180	13
Sangju Sangmu (draft)	2019	K League 1	15	3	5	1	—		—		20	4
Sangju Sangmu (draft)	2020	K League 1	16	7	0	0	—		—		16	7
Sangju Sangmu (draft)	Total		31	10	5	1	—		—		36	11
Beijing Guoan	2022	Chinese Super League	31	4	0	0	—		—		31	4
Beijing Guoan	2023	Chinese Super League	26	8	2	1	—		—		28	9
Beijing Guoan	Total		57	12	2	1	—		—		59	13
FC Seoul	2024	K League 1	35	1	2	0	—		—		37	1
Ulsan HD	2025	K League 1	32	1	1	0	1	0	3	0	37	1
Career total			315	34	13	3	18	2	3	0	349	39

== Honours ==
South Korea U-20

- AFC U-19 Championship: 2012

South Korea U-23

- King's Cup: 2015

Individual

- K League 1 top assist provider: 2020
- K League 1 Best XI: 2020, 2021
