= Chen Yanpu =

Chinese association football player

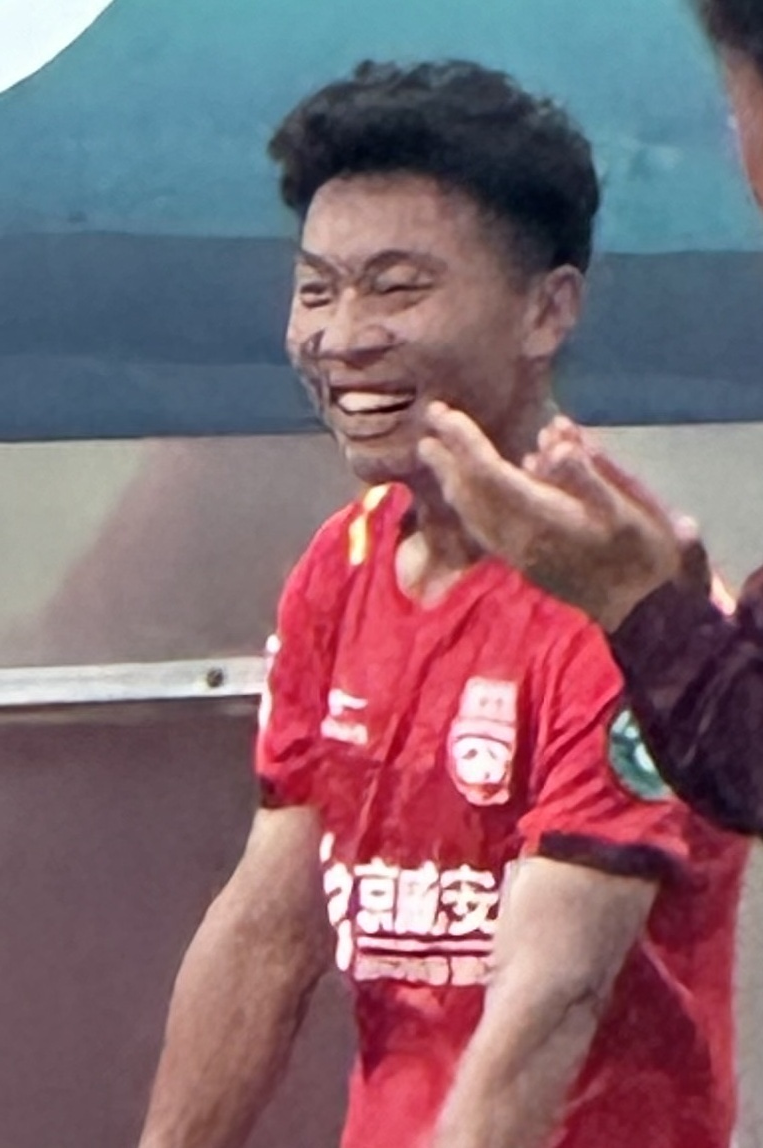
- Chen Yanpu in August 2024

Personal information
- Date of birth: 12 March 2001 (age 25)
- Place of birth: Kaiyuan, Yunnan, China
- Height: 1.66 m (5 ft 5 in)
- Position: Midfielder

Team information
- Current team: Guizhou Guiyang Athletic (on loan from Shaanxi Union)
- Number: 40

Youth career
- 2019–2020: Beijing Guoan

Senior career*
Years	Team	Apps	(Gls)
2020–2023	Beijing Guoan	1	(0)
2024	Langfang Glory City	21	(1)
2025–	Shaanxi Union	29	(2)
2026–	→ Guizhou Guiyang Athletic (loan)	0	(0)

International career^{‡}
2018	China U17	3	(0)
- * Club domestic league appearances and goals as of 14:01, 31 January 2023 (UTC) ‡ National team caps and goals as of 14:01, 26 June 2021 (UTC)

Chen Yanpu (simplified Chinese: 陈彦朴; traditional Chinese: 陳彥樸; pinyin: Chén Yànpǔ; born 12 March 2001) is a Chinese footballer currently playing as a midfielder for Guizhou Guiyang Athletic, on loan from Shaanxi Union.

== Club career ==
Chen Yanpu was promoted to the senior team of Beijing Guoan within the 2020 Chinese Super League season. He would make his debut in a Chinese FA Cup game on 28 November 2020 against Chengdu Better City in a 1–0 victory. He would be given an opportunity to participate within senior games when he was part of the AFC Champions League squad, which was a mix of reserves and youth players to participate within centralized venues while the clubs senior players were still dealing with self-isolating measures due to COVID-19. He would make his continental debut in an AFC Champions League game on 26 June 2021 against United City F.C. in a 1–1 draw. He would go on to make his debut in a league game on 14 September 2022 against Hebei F.C. in a 3–1 victory.

== Career statistics ==
As of 31 January 2023.

Club	Season	League			Cup		Continental		Other		Total	
Club	Season	Division	Apps	Goals	Apps	Goals	Apps	Goals	Apps	Goals	Apps	Goals
Beijing Guoan	2020	Chinese Super League	0	0	2	0	0	0	-		2	0
Beijing Guoan	2021	Chinese Super League	0	0	0	0	6 (Note: Appearances in the AFC Champions League)	0	-		6	0
Beijing Guoan	2022	Chinese Super League	1	0	1	0	-		-		2	0
Beijing Guoan	Total		1	0	3	0	6	0	0	0	10	0
Career total			1	0	3	0	6	0	0	0	10	0
