= Sun Guoliang =

Chinese footballer (born 1991)

Personal information
- Date of birth: 6 February 1991 (age 35)
- Place of birth: Qingdao, Shandong, China
- Height: 1.82 m (6 ft 0 in)
- Position: Defender

Team information
- Current team: Changchun Yatai
- Number: 33

Senior career*
Years	Team	Apps	(Gls)
2013–2016	Hunan Billows	63	(0)
2017–2018	Qingdao Huanghai	21	(1)
2019–2022	Kunshan FC	72	(6)
2023	Nanjing City	28	(1)
2024–	Changchun Yatai	13	(1)
- * Club domestic league appearances and goals as of 28 August 2025

Sun Guoliang (Chinese: 孙国梁; born 6 February 1991) is a Chinese professional footballer currently playing as a defender for China League One club Changchun Yatai.

== Club career ==
Sun Guoliang would play for second tier club Hunan Billows for several seasons before he joined another second tier club Qingdao Huanghai on 4 January 2017. He would make his debut for Qingdao in a league game on 11 March 2017 against Beijing Enterprises Group in a 2-1 victory. After two seasons he moved to third tier club Kunshan on 20 February 2019 and was part of the team that gained promotion to the second tier at the end of the 2019 China League Two campaign. He would go on to establish himself as regular within the team and was part of the squad that won the division and promotion to the top tier at the end of the 2022 China League One campaign.

In April 2023, Sun joined China League One club Nanjing City following the dissolution of Kunshan FC.

=== Club career ===
On 7 February 2024, Sun joined Chinese Super League club Changchun Yatai. On 10 April 2024, he made his debut for the club in a 2-0 away defeat against Cangzhou Mighty Lions. On 10 May 2024, he scored his first goal for the club in a 5-2 away defeat against Shanghai Port.

== Career statistics ==
As of 28 October 2023.

Club	Season	League			Cup		Continental		Other		Total	
Club	Season	Division	Apps	Goals	Apps	Goals	Apps	Goals	Apps	Goals	Apps	Goals
Hunan Billows	2012	China League One	9	0	0	0	-		-		0	0
Hunan Billows	2013	China League One	15	0	1	0	-		-		16	0
Hunan Billows	2014	China League One	13	0	2	0	-		-		15	0
Hunan Billows	2015	China League One	15	0	1	0	-		-		16	0
Hunan Billows	2016	China League One	11	0	1	0	-		-		12	0
Hunan Billows	Total		63	0	5	0	0	0	0	0	59	0
Qingdao Huanghai	2017	China League One	12	1	2	0	-		-		14	1
Qingdao Huanghai	2018	China League One	9	0	0	0	-		-		9	0
Qingdao Huanghai	Total		21	1	2	0	0	0	0	0	23	1
Kunshan	2019	China League Two	28	3	0	0	-		-		28	3
Kunshan	2020	China League One	9	0	2	0	-		-		11	0
Kunshan	2021	China League One	15	1	0	0	-		-		15	1
Kunshan	2022	China League One	20	2	0	0	-		-		20	2
Kunshan	Total		72	6	2	0	0	0	0	0	74	6
Nanjing City	2023	China League One	28	1	0	0	-		-		28	1
Career total			184	8	9	0	0	0	0	0	193	8

== Honours ==
=== Club ===
Kunshan

- China League One: 2022
