= Wang Ziming (footballer) =

Chinese footballer

Wang Ziming 王子铭
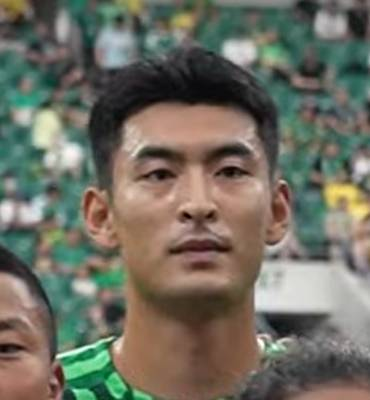
- Wang Ziming in June 2023

Personal information
- Date of birth: 5 August 1996 (age 30)
- Place of birth: Qingdao, Shandong, China
- Height: 1.87 m (6 ft 1 1/2 in)
- Position: Forward

Team information
- Current team: Chengdu Rongcheng
- Number: 20

Youth career
- Qingdao Hailifeng
- 2010–2014: Qingdao Jonoon

Senior career*
Years	Team	Apps	(Gls)
2014–2017	Qingdao Jonoon	30	(1)
2017–2025	Beijing Guoan	154	(29)
2017	→ Qingdao Jonoon (loan)	8	(2)
2026–	Chengdu Rongcheng	18	(0)

International career^{‡}
2016–2017	China U23	4	(0)
2019–	China	15	(3)
Medal record
Representing China
Men's football
EAFF Championship
Bronze medal – third place	2019 South Korea	Team
Bronze medal – third place	2025 South Korea	Team
- * Club domestic league appearances and goals as of 31 August 2026 ‡ National team caps and goals as of 24 September 2026

Wang Ziming (Chinese: 王子铭; pinyin: Wáng Zǐmíng; born 5 August 1996) is a Chinese professional footballer who plays as a striker for Chinese Super League club Chengdu Rongcheng and represents the China national team.

== Club career ==
=== Qingdao Jonoon ===
Wang Ziming joined Qingdao Jonoon's youth academy in 2010 when Qingdao Hailifeng was dissolved due to match-fixing. He was promoted to Qingdao Jonoon's first team squad in the summer of 2014. He made his senior debut on 4 October 2014 in a 1–1 home draw against Yanbian FC, coming on as a substitute for Cristian Dănălache in the 73rd minute. On 25 September 2016, he scored his first senior goal in a 1–0 home win over Hunan Billows.

=== Beijing Guoan ===
On 14 July 2017, Wang transferred to Chinese Super League side Beijing Sinobo Guoan with a five-year contract. He was then loan back to Qingdao Jonoon for the rest of the 2017 season. Wang returned to Beijing Guoan in January 2018. On 4 March 2018, he made his debut for the club in a 3–0 away defeat against Shandong Luneng Taishan, coming on for Jonathan Soriano in the 84th minute.

He became a regular feature in the Guoan lineup in the 2019 season, featuring a total of 25 times and scoring 7 goals. He was favored by Roger Schmidt and was caped consistently from matchday 12 to matchday 19 in Guoan's Chinese Super League campaign. His performance earned him a spot in the Chinese national team. However, he briefly fell out of favor under Bruno Génésio, who replaced Schmidt toward the later half of the season. Wang eventually earned his way back to the match squad and scored twice as substitute in the last four games of the season. Wang was considered a lucky charm for the team by the Chinese media as four of his seven goals were scored after the 88th minute.

On 8 July 2023, Wang completed his first career hat-trick in a 5-0 home win against Shenzhen F.C. On 4 August 2024, Wang came on as a substitute in the 92nd minute and scored a late winner in the 97th minute in a 2–1 home win against Shanghai Shenhua, ending the opponent's 20-game unbeat run in the league since the start of the season, and in the mean time ensured Guoan won their 12th consecutive meeting with Shenhua at home since 2010. This game later proved to be Shenhua's only defeat in the entire 2024 season, and they missed out on winning their first Chinese Super League title only by this one point.

On 31 December 2025, Wang Ziming announced his departure from the Beijing Guoan after 8 years at the club. He thanked the club and the fans in his social media post. In 186 games for the club, he scored 36 goals and provided 5 assists.

=== Chengdu Rongcheng ===
On 6 January 2026, Chinese Super League club Chengdu Rongcheng announced that it had signed Wang Ziming.

== International career ==
Wang made his debut for China national football team on 7 June 2019 in a 2–0 home win against Philippines in an international friendly game, as an 80th-minute substitute for Yang Xu.

On 24 September 2026, Wang scored his first international goal with a hat-trick in a 3–0 win over Maldives in a friendly match.

== Career statistics ==
=== Club statistics ===
As of 31 December 2025.

Appearances and goals by club, season and competition
Club	Season	League			Cup		Continental		Other		Total	
Club	Season	Division	Apps	Goals	Apps	Goals	Apps	Goals	Apps	Goals	Apps	Goals
Qingdao Jonoon	2014	China League One	1	0	0	0	—		—		1	0
Qingdao Jonoon	2015	China League One	5	0	2	0	—		—		7	0
Qingdao Jonoon	2016	China League One	12	1	0	0	—		—		12	1
Qingdao Jonoon	2017	China League Two	20	2	1	1	—		—		21	3
Qingdao Jonoon	Total		38	3	3	1	0	0	0	0	41	4
Beijing Guoan	2018	Chinese Super League	16	0	5	0	—		—		21	0
Beijing Guoan	2019	Chinese Super League	26	7	2	0	3	0	1 (Note: Appearance in Chinese FA Super Cup)	0	32	7
Beijing Guoan	2020	Chinese Super League	15	1	1	0	6	2	—		22	3
Beijing Guoan	2021	Chinese Super League	18	0	1	1	0	0	—		19	1
Beijing Guoan	2022	Chinese Super League	25	5	1	0	—		—		26	5
Beijing Guoan	2023	Chinese Super League	24	8	3	0	—		—		27	8
Beijing Guoan	2024	Chinese Super League	18	6	3	1	—		—		21	7
Beijing Guoan	2025	Chinese Super League	12	2	3	3	2 (Note: Appearance in AFC Champions League Two)	0	—		17	5
Beijing Guoan	Total		154	29	19	5	11	2	1	0	185	36
Career total			192	32	22	6	11	2	1	0	226	40

=== International statistics ===
As of 24 September 2026.

National team
Year	Apps	Goals
2019	2	0
2023	3	0
2024	2	0
2025	4	0
2026	4	3
Total	15	3

Scores and results list China's goal tally first, score column indicates score after each Wang goal.

List of international goals scored by Wang Ziming
No.	Date	Venue	Opponent	Score	Result	Competition
1	24 September 2026	Longxing Football Stadium, Chongqing, China	Maldives	1–0	3–0	Friendly
2	24 September 2026	Longxing Football Stadium, Chongqing, China	Maldives	2–0	3–0	Friendly
3	24 September 2026	Longxing Football Stadium, Chongqing, China	Maldives	3–0	3–0	Friendly

== Honours ==
Beijing Guoan

- Chinese FA Cup: 2018, 2025
