= Xu Tianyuan =

Chinese footballer

Xu Tianyuan 徐天沅
Personal information
- Date of birth: 8 May 1997 (age 29)
- Place of birth: Shanghai, China
- Height: 1.80 m (5 ft 11 in)
- Position: Left winger

Youth career
- 2006–2010: Shanghai Shenhua
- 2010: → Atlético Madrid (loan)
- 2011–2014: Shanghai Luckystar
- 2015–2017: Rayo Vallecano

Senior career*
Years	Team	Apps	(Gls)
2017–2022	Hebei FC	55	(0)
2023–2024	Suzhou Dongwu	19	(0)
Total		74	(0)

International career^{‡}
2014–2015	China U-19	5	(0)
2018	China U-23	1	(0)
- * Club domestic league appearances and goals as of 15 July 2024 ‡ National team caps and goals as of 17 November 2018

Xu Tianyuan (Chinese: 徐天沅; pinyin: Xú Tiānyuán; born 8 May 1997) is a Chinese former professional footballer who played as a winger for Hebei FC and Suzhou Dongwu.

== Club career ==
Xu Tianyuan transferred to Chinese Super League side Hebei China Fortune in February 2017. He made his senior debut on 3 March 2018 in a 1–1 away draw against Tianjin TEDA, coming on as a substitute for Hu Rentian in the 84th minute.

After Hebei disbanded ahead of the 2023 season, Xu joined China League One team Suzhou Dongwu. He made 17 appearances in that season and registered 2 assists.

Xu announced his retirement on 15 July 2024 at the age of 27. In the announcement, he said that he "did not achieve his dreams but has to retire" due to family and mental reasons.

== Career statistics ==
As of 15 July 2024.

Appearances and goals by club, season and competition
Club	Season	League			National Cup		Continental		Other		Total	
Club	Season	Division	Apps	Goals	Apps	Goals	Apps	Goals	Apps	Goals	Apps	Goals
Hebei China Fortune/ Hebei FC	2017	Chinese Super League	0	0	0	0	–		–		0	0
Hebei China Fortune/ Hebei FC	2018	Chinese Super League	14	0	2	0	–		–		16	0
Hebei China Fortune/ Hebei FC	2019	Chinese Super League	9	0	1	0	–		–		10	0
Hebei China Fortune/ Hebei FC	2020	Chinese Super League	6	0	1	0	–		–		7	0
Hebei China Fortune/ Hebei FC	2021	Chinese Super League	7	0	1	0	–		–		8	0
Hebei China Fortune/ Hebei FC	2022	Chinese Super League	19	0	0	0	–		–		19	0
Hebei China Fortune/ Hebei FC	Total		55	0	5	0	0	0	0	0	60	0
Suzhou Dongwu	2023	China League One	17	0	0	0	–		–		17	0
Suzhou Dongwu	2024	China League One	2	0	0	0	–		–		2	0
Suzhou Dongwu	Total		19	0	9	0	0	0	0	0	19	0
Career total			74	0	5	0	0	0	0	0	79	0
