= Feng Shuaihang =

Chinese association football player

Personal information
- Date of birth: 21 January 2001 (age 25)
- Place of birth: Shenyang, China
- Height: 1.80 m (5 ft 11 in)
- Position: Midfielder

Team information
- Current team: Changchun Yatai
- Number: 33

Youth career
- –2019: Changchun Yatai

Senior career*
Years	Team	Apps	(Gls)
2019–	Changchun Yatai	13	(0)

International career^{‡}
2018	China U17	5	(0)
- * Club domestic league appearances and goals as of 00:01, 31 December 2022 (UTC) ‡ National team caps and goals as of 00:01, 25 December 2021 (UTC)

Feng Shuaihang (Chinese: 冯率航; born 21 January 2001) is a Chinese footballer currently playing as a midfielder for Changchun Yatai.

== Club career ==
Feng Shuaihang would play for the Changchun Yatai's youth team before being promoted to the first team squad in the 2019 China League One season. He made his debut for Changchun on 16 April 2019 in a Chinese FA Cup game against Nantong Zhiyun in a 1–0 victory. This would be followed by his league debut on 4 May 2019 against Xinjiang Tianshan Leopard in a 4–3 victory. He would be used sparingly and in the following season he was not included in the first team squad that won promotion. Feng would work his way back into the senior team and go on to make his top tier debut on 11 July 2022 in a 6–2 defeat against Henan Songshan Longmen.

== Career statistics ==
As of 25 December 2022.

Club	Season	League			Cup		Continental		Other		Total	
Club	Season	Division	Apps	Goals	Apps	Goals	Apps	Goals	Apps	Goals	Apps	Goals
Changchun Yatai	2019	China League One	3	0	3	0	–		–		6	0
Changchun Yatai	2020	China League One	0	0	0	0	–		–		0	0
Changchun Yatai	2021	Chinese Super League	0	0	0	0	–		–		0	0
Changchun Yatai	2022	Chinese Super League	10	0	1	0	–		–		11	0
Career total			13	0	4	0	0	0	0	0	17	0
