= Dong Yu (footballer) =

Chinese footballer

Dong Yu 董宇
Personal information
- Full name: Dong Yu
- Date of birth: 15 July 1994 (age 32)
- Place of birth: Qingdao, Shandong, China
- Height: 1.83 m (6 ft 0 in)
- Position: Right-back

Team information
- Current team: Qingdao West Coast
- Number: 19

Youth career
- Hangzhou Greentown

Senior career*
Years	Team	Apps	(Gls)
2014–2025	Zhejiang FC	186	(8)
2026–	Qingdao West Coast	22	(0)
- * Club domestic league appearances and goals as of 19 November 2026

Dong Yu (Chinese: 董宇; born 15 July 1994 in Qingdao) is a Chinese footballer who plays as a right-back for Qingdao West Coast.

== Club career ==
In 2014 Dong Yu started his professional footballer career with Chinese Super League side Hangzhou Greentown in 2014, where he initially started his youth career as a forward. He made his league debut for Hangzhou on 6 April 2014 in a league game against Guizhou Renhe that ended in a 2-1 victory. Dong would struggle to gain much playing time as a forward and was unfortunately part of the squad that was relegated at the end of the 2016 Chinese Super League season. He would remain with the club and go on to be converted to a right-back before establishing himself as a regular member within the team as they renamed themselves Zhejiang Professional. He would then play a vital part as the club gained promotion to the top tier at the end of the 2021 campaign.On 19 December 2025, the club announced Dong's departure after the 2025 season.

== Career statistics ==
As of match played 13 July 2024.

Appearances and goals by club, season and competition
Club	Season	League			National Cup		Continental		Other		Total	
Club	Season	Division	Apps	Goals	Apps	Goals	Apps	Goals	Apps	Goals	Apps	Goals
Hangzhou Greentown/ Zhejiang Greentown/ Zhejiang FC	2014	Chinese Super League	1	0	2	0	-		-		3	0
Hangzhou Greentown/ Zhejiang Greentown/ Zhejiang FC	2015	Chinese Super League	0	0	1	0	-		-		1	0
Hangzhou Greentown/ Zhejiang Greentown/ Zhejiang FC	2016	Chinese Super League	7	0	2	0	-		-		9	0
Hangzhou Greentown/ Zhejiang Greentown/ Zhejiang FC	2017	China League One	22	0	2	0	-		-		24	0
Hangzhou Greentown/ Zhejiang Greentown/ Zhejiang FC	2018	China League One	25	3	0	0	-		-		25	3
Hangzhou Greentown/ Zhejiang Greentown/ Zhejiang FC	2019	China League One	27	3	0	0	-		-		27	3
Hangzhou Greentown/ Zhejiang Greentown/ Zhejiang FC	2020	China League One	14	2	1	0	-		2 (Note: Appearances in Promotion/Relegation Play-offs)	0	17	2
Hangzhou Greentown/ Zhejiang Greentown/ Zhejiang FC	2021	China League One	26	0	0	0	-		2	0	28	0
Hangzhou Greentown/ Zhejiang Greentown/ Zhejiang FC	2022	Chinese Super League	28	0	5	0	-		-		33	0
Hangzhou Greentown/ Zhejiang Greentown/ Zhejiang FC	2023	Chinese Super League	23	0	2	0	6	0	-		31	0
Hangzhou Greentown/ Zhejiang Greentown/ Zhejiang FC	2024	Chinese Super League	13	0	0	0	0	0	-		13	0
Hangzhou Greentown/ Zhejiang Greentown/ Zhejiang FC	2025	Chinese Super League	0	0	0	0	-		-		0	0
Hangzhou Greentown/ Zhejiang Greentown/ Zhejiang FC	Total		186	8	15	0	6	0	4	0	211	8
Career total			186	8	15	0	6	0	4	0	211	8
