= Li Boxi =

Chinese association football player

Personal information
- Date of birth: 30 October 2000 (age 26)
- Place of birth: Qinhuangdao, Hebei, China
- Height: 1.87 m (6 ft 2 in)
- Position: Forward

Team information
- Current team: Wuxi Wugo
- Number: 30

Youth career
- –2017: Beijing FA
- 2018–2020: Beijing Guoan

Senior career*
Years	Team	Apps	(Gls)
2020–2024	Beijing Guoan	10	(0)
2023	→ Shijiazhuang Gongfu (loan)	8	(1)
2023–2024	→ Wuxi Wugou (loan)	42	(4)
2025–	Wuxi Wugo	0	(0)
- * Club domestic league appearances and goals as of 14:01, 26 June 2021 (UTC)

Li Boxi (Chinese: 李博希; born 30 October 2000) is a Chinese footballer currently playing as a forward for Wuxi Wugou.

== Career statistics ==
=== Club ===
As of 26 June 2021.

Club	Season	League			Cup		Continental		Other		Total	
Club	Season	Division	Apps	Goals	Apps	Goals	Apps	Goals	Apps	Goals	Apps	Goals
Beijing Guoan	2020	Chinese Super League	0	0	2 (Note: Appearances in the Chinese FA Cup)	0	0	0	0	0	2	0
Beijing Guoan	2021	Chinese Super League	0	0	0	0	1 (Note: Appearances in the AFC Champions League)	0	0	0	1	0
Career total			0	0	2	0	1	0	0	0	3	0
