= Piao Shihao =

Chinese footballer

Piao Shihao 박세호 朴世豪
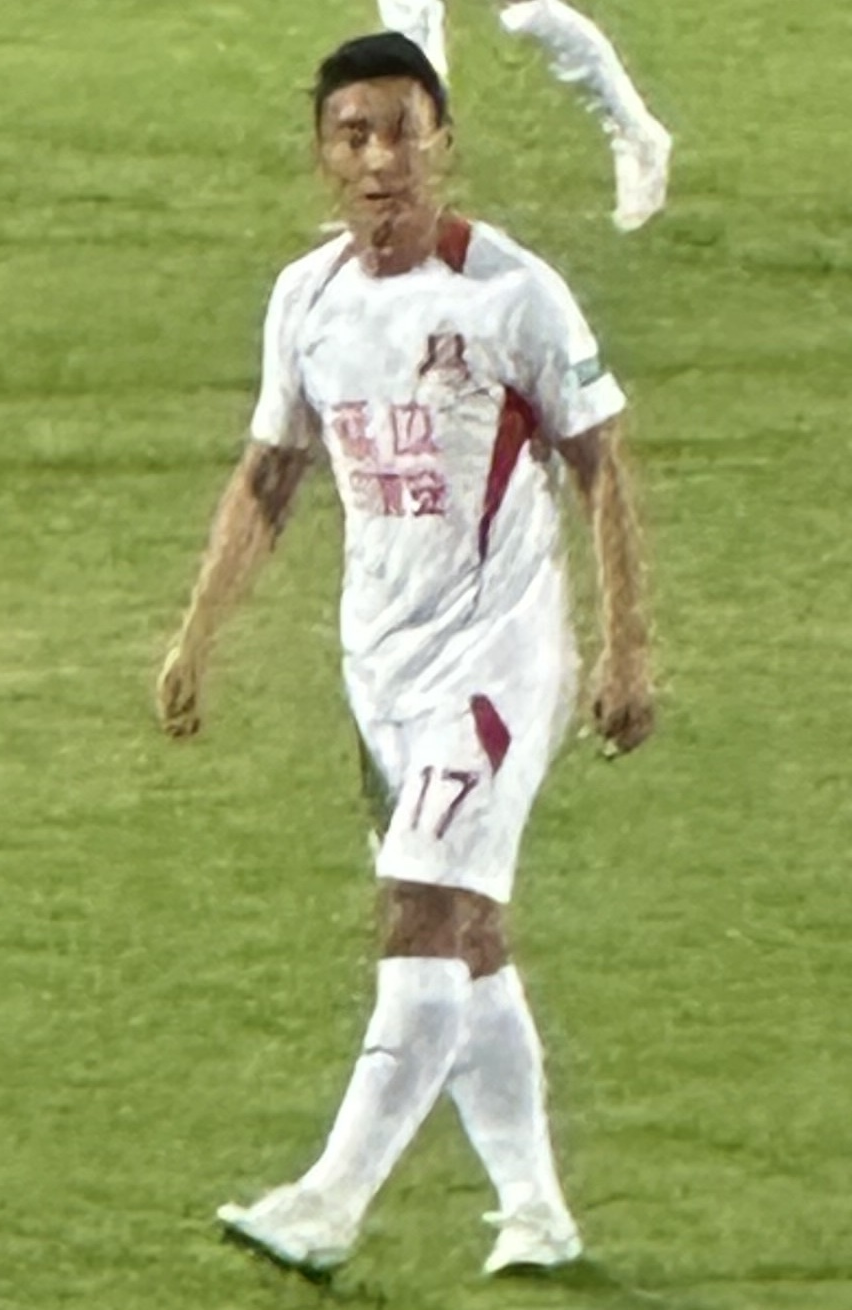
- Piao Shihao in May 2025

Personal information
- Date of birth: 9 July 1991 (age 35)
- Place of birth: Yanbian, Jilin, China
- Height: 1.77 m (5 ft 10 in)
- Positions: Defensive midfielder; defender

Team information
- Current team: Yanbian Longding
- Number: 17

Senior career*
Years	Team	Apps	(Gls)
2011–2018	Yanbian Funde	120	(3)
2019–2023	Cangzhou Mighty Lions	81	(4)
2024	Qingdao West Coast	18	(0)
2025–	Yanbian Longding	0	(0)
- * Club domestic league appearances and goals as of 31 December 2022

Piao Shihao
- Simplified Chinese: 朴世豪
Transcriptions
Standard Mandarin
- Hanyu Pinyin: Piáo Shìháo
- IPA: [pʰjǎʊ ʂɻ̩̂ xǎʊ]

Chinese Korean name
- Chosŏn'gŭl: 박세호
Transcriptions
- Revised Romanization: Bak Seho
- McCune–Reischauer: Pak Seho

Piao Shihao (Chinese: 朴世豪; Korean: 박세호; born 9 July 1991) is a Chinese footballer who currently plays as a defensive midfielder or defender for Yanbian Longding.

== Club career ==
Piao Shihao started his professional football career in 2011 when he was promoted to Yanbian FC's first squad. He would gradually establish himself as a vital member of the team and go on to win the division title and promotion to the top tier when the club won the 2015 China League One campaign. On 5 March 2016, Piao made his Super League debut in the first match of 2016 season against Shanghai Shenhua, coming on as a substitute for Chi Zhongguo in the 82nd minute.

On 27 February 2019, Piao transferred to fellow League One side Shijiazhuang Ever Bright (now known as Cangzhou Mighty Lions). He would make his debut on 10 March 2019 in a league game against Nantong Zhiyun that ended in a 2-1 victory. In his first season with the club he would help the team to a runners-up position and promotion into the top tier. After establishing himself as regular within the team, he would unfortunately be part of the squad that finished bottom within the league, however the club was given a reprieve from relegation after the dissolution of Jiangsu Suning. Piao would keep his place within the team and start to establish himself as an integral member of the squad and go on score his first goal for the club in a league game on 25 June 2022 against Beijing Guoan F.C. in a 1-1 draw.

== Career statistics ==
Statistics accurate as of match played 31 December 2022.

Appearances and goals by club, season and competition
Club	Season	League			National Cup		Continental		Other		Total	
Club	Season	Division	Apps	Goals	Apps	Goals	Apps	Goals	Apps	Goals	Apps	Goals
Yanbian FC	2011	China League One	0	0	0	0	-		-		0	0
Yanbian FC	2012	China League One	8	0	0	0	-		-		8	0
Yanbian FC	2013	China League One	7	0	0	0	-		-		7	0
Yanbian FC	2014	China League One	12	0	1	1	-		-		13	1
Yanbian FC	2015	China League One	27	0	1	0	-		-		28	0
Yanbian FC	2016	Chinese Super League	11	0	1	0	-		-		12	0
Yanbian FC	2017	Chinese Super League	25	0	1	0	-		-		26	0
Yanbian FC	2018	China League One	30	3	0	0	-		-		30	3
Yanbian FC	Total		120	3	4	1	0	0	0	0	124	4
Shijiazhuang Ever Bright/ Cangzhou Mighty Lions	2019	Chihna League One	8	0	0	0	–		–		8	0
Shijiazhuang Ever Bright/ Cangzhou Mighty Lions	2020	Chinese Super League	15	0	1	0	–		–		16	0
Shijiazhuang Ever Bright/ Cangzhou Mighty Lions	2021	Chinese Super League	9	0	2	0	–		–		11	0
Shijiazhuang Ever Bright/ Cangzhou Mighty Lions	2022	Chinese Super League	25	4	1	0	–		–		26	4
Shijiazhuang Ever Bright/ Cangzhou Mighty Lions	Total		57	4	4	0	0	0	0	0	61	4
Career total			177	7	8	1	0	0	0	0	185	8

== Honours ==
=== Club ===
Yanbian FC

- China League One: 2015
