= Tian Yuda =

Chinese association football player

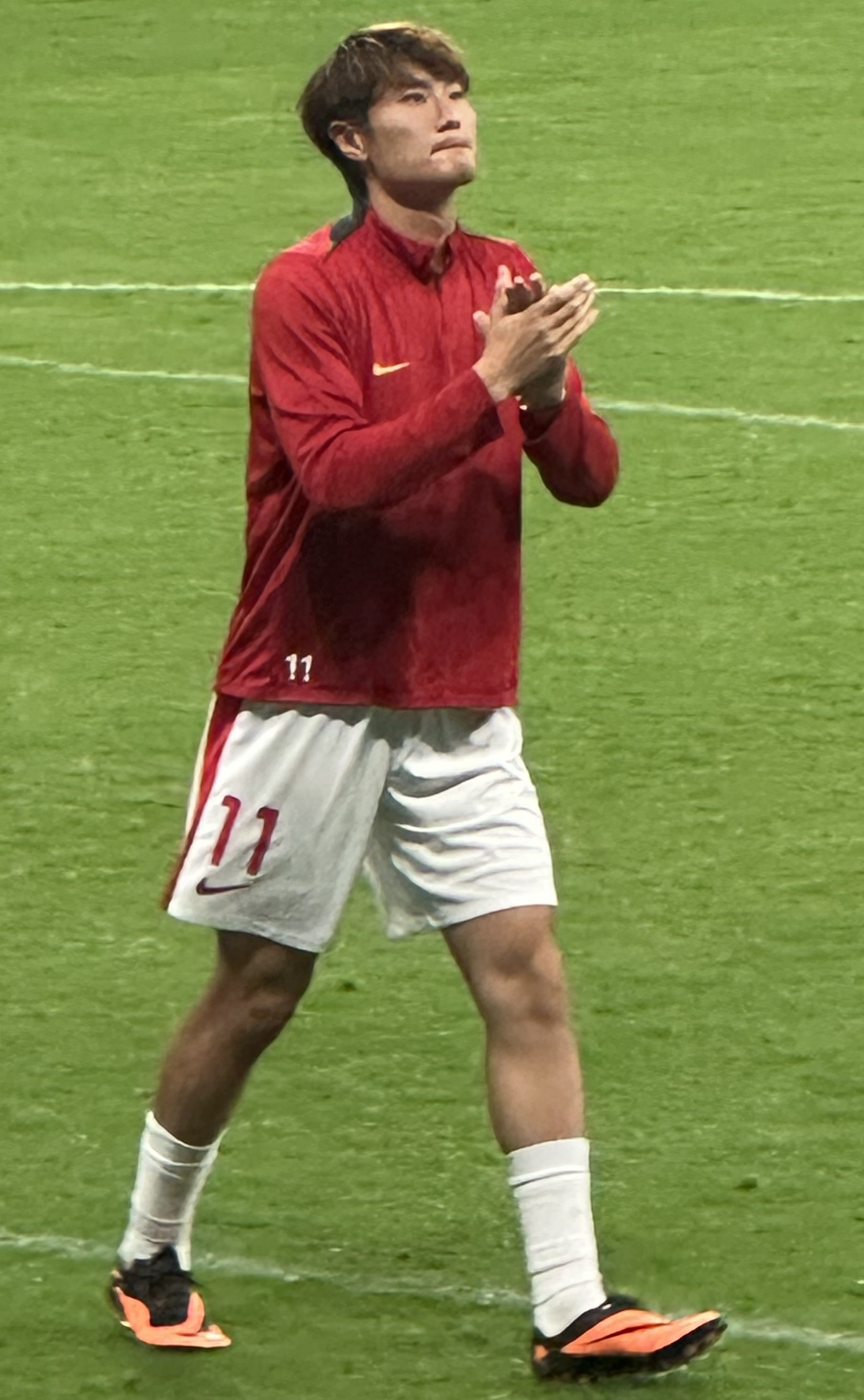
- Tian Yuda after a Changchun Yatai game in 2025

Personal information
- Date of birth: 26 November 2001 (age 24)
- Place of birth: Beijing, China
- Height: 1.90 m (6 ft 3 in)
- Position: Forward

Team information
- Current team: Liaoning Tieren
- Number: 17

Youth career
- –2019: Shandong Taishan

Senior career*
Years	Team	Apps	(Gls)
2019–2021	Shandong Taishan	0	(0)
2019	→ Beijing BSU (loan)	0	(0)
2020	→ Hebei Zhuoao (loan)	9	(1)
2021	→ Beijing BSU (loan)	25	(5)
2021	→ China U20 (loan)	3	(0)
2022-2023	Beijing Guoan	4	(0)
2023	→ Changchun Yatai (loan)	4	(1)
2024–2025	Changchun Yatai	23	(1)
2026–	Liaoning Tieren	14	(2)

International career^{‡}
2019	China U18	2	(0)
- * Club domestic league appearances and goals as of 22 November 2026 ‡ National team caps and goals as of 14:01, 28 July 2021 (UTC)

Tian Yuda (Chinese: 田玉达; born 26 November 2001) is a Chinese professional footballer who currently plays for Chinese Super League club Liaoning Tieren.

== Club career ==
Tian Yuda would play for the Shandong Taishan youth team before being loaned out to second tier club Beijing BSU on 25 February 2019. He would make his debut in a Chinese FA Cup game against Shenzhen Pengcheng on 17 April 2019 in a 5-1 victory where he came on as a late substitute. The following season he would be loaned out to third tier club Hebei Zhuoao before joining Beijing BSU once again on another loan. He would go on to personally have his breakout season by immediately establishing within the team with 25 league appearances and scoring five goals.

On 22 April 2022, Tian joined Chinese Super League club Beijing Guoan. He would go on to make his debut in a league game on 14 September 2022 against Hebei F.C. in a 3-1 victory. After only making a handful of appearances he was loaned out to fellow top tier club Changchun Yatai for the start of the 2023 Chinese Super League season.

On 28 January 2026, Tian joined Chinese Super League club Liaoning Tieren.

== Career statistics ==
As of 31 January 2023.

Club	Season	League			Cup		Continental		Other		Total	
Club	Season	Division	Apps	Goals	Apps	Goals	Apps	Goals	Apps	Goals	Apps	Goals
Shandong Taishan	2019	Chinese Super League	0	0	0	0	0	0	–		0	0
Shandong Taishan	2020	Chinese Super League	0	0	0	0	–		–		0	0
Shandong Taishan	2021	Chinese Super League	0	0	0	0	–		–		0	0
Shandong Taishan	Total		0	0	0	0	0	0	0	0	0	0
Beijing BSU (loan)	2019	China League One	0	0	2	0	–		–		2	0
Hebei Zhuoao (loan)	2020	China League Two	9	1	0	0	–		–		9	1
Beijing BSU (loan)	2021	China League One	25	5	1	0	–		–		26	5
China U20 (loan)	2021	China League Two	3	0	0	0	–		–		3	0
Beijing Guoan	2022	Chinese Super League	4	0	1	0	–		–		5	0
Career total			41	6	4	0	0	0	0	0	45	6
