= Zou Dehai =

Chinese footballer

Zou Dehai 邹德海
Personal information
- Full name: Zou Dehai
- Date of birth: 27 February 1993 (age 33)
- Place of birth: Dalian, Liaoning, China
- Height: 1.87 m (6 ft 1 1/2 in)
- Position: Goalkeeper

Youth career
- Hangzhou Greentown

Senior career*
Years	Team	Apps	(Gls)
2011	Wenzhou Provenza	15	(0)
2012–2018	Hangzhou Greentown	73	(0)
2019–2023	Beijing Guoan	40	(0)
2024–2025	Changchun Yatai	3	(0)

International career
2012	China U-19	1	(0)
Medal record
Representing China
Men's football
EAFF Championship
Bronze medal – third place	2019 South Korea	Team
- * Club domestic league appearances and goals as of 16 April 2023

Zou Dehai
- Simplified Chinese: 邹德海
- Traditional Chinese: 鄒德海
Transcriptions
Standard Mandarin
- Hanyu Pinyin: Zōu Déhǎi
- IPA: [tsóʊ tɤ̌ xàɪ]

Zou Dehai (Chinese: 邹德海; pinyin: Zōu Déhǎi; born 27 February 1993, in Dalian) is a Chinese footballer who plays as a goalkeeper.

== Club career ==
Zou Dehai started his professional football career in 2011 when he was loaned to Wenzhou Provenza's squad for the 2011 China League Two campaign. He was promoted to Hangzhou Greentown first team squad in 2012 by Takeshi Okada. He made his Super League debut on 28 May 2016 against Jiangsu Suning in a 1-1 draw. After the game he would establish himself as the club's first choice goalkeeper, however he was not able to keep the team from relegation at the end of the 2016 Chinese Super League season.

On 31 January 2019, Zou transferred to Chinese Super League side Beijing Sinobo Guoan. He would make his debut on 1 March 2019, in a league game against Wuhan Zall F.C. that ended in a 1-0 victory. After the game he would establish himself as the club's first choice goalkeeper throughout the season as the club came runners up within the 2019 Chinese Super League season.

== Career statistics ==
Statistics accurate as of match played 16 April 2023.

Appearances and goals by club, season and competition
Club	Season	League			National Cup		Continental		Other		Total	
Club	Season	Division	Apps	Goals	Apps	Goals	Apps	Goals	Apps	Goals	Apps	Goals
Wenzhou Provenza	2011	China League Two	15	0	-		-		-		15	0
Hangzhou Greentown	2012	Chinese Super League	0	0	0	0	-		-		0	0
Hangzhou Greentown	2013	Chinese Super League	0	0	2	0	-		-		2	0
Hangzhou Greentown	2014	Chinese Super League	0	0	0	0	-		-		0	0
Hangzhou Greentown	2015	Chinese Super League	0	0	0	0	-		-		0	0
Hangzhou Greentown	2016	Chinese Super League	20	0	2	0	-		-		22	0
Hangzhou Greentown	2017	China League One	26	0	2	0	-		-		28	0
Hangzhou Greentown	2018	China League One	27	0	0	0	-		-		27	0
Hangzhou Greentown	Total		73	0	6	0	0	0	0	0	79	0
Beijing Guoan	2019	Chinese Super League	28	0	2	0	6	0	0 (Note: Appearance in Chinese FA Super Cup)	0	36	0
Beijing Guoan	2020	Chinese Super League	0	0	1	0	0	0	-		1	0
Beijing Guoan	2021	Chinese Super League	0	0	0	0	0	0	-		0	0
Beijing Guoan	2022	Chinese Super League	11	0	0	0	-		-		11	0
Beijing Guoan	2023	Chinese Super League	1	0	0	0	-		-		1	0
Beijing Guoan	Total		40	0	3	0	6	0	0	0	49	0
Career total			127	0	9	0	6	0	0	0	143	0
