= 2026 Beijing Guoan F.C. season =

Beijing Guoan F.C.'s 62nd season in football competition

Beijing Guoan
2026 season
- CEO: Zhou Jinhui
- Sporting director: Matthias Brosamer
- Manager: Nick Montgomery
- Stadium: Workers' Stadium
- Super League: 3rd
- FA Cup: Semi-finals
- FA Super Cup: Winners
- AFC Champions League Elite: 9th in East
- Top goalscorer: League: Zhang Yuning (15 goals); All: Zhang Yuning (17 goals)
- Highest home attendance: 64,118 vs. Shanghai Shenhua (21 March, CSL)
- Lowest home attendance: 27,638 vs. Jeonbuk Hyundai Motors (27 October, ACLE)
- Average home league attendance: 46,599 (Note: Home league matches only.)
- Biggest win: 4–0 vs. Shenzhen Peng City (home, 7 August, CSL)
- Biggest defeat: 4–7 vs. Port (away, 3 November, ACLE)

The 2026 season is Beijing Guoan F.C.'s 62nd season in Chinese football competitions. This season marks the club's 23rd consecutive season in the Chinese Super League since the league's inaugural season in 2004, and it is the club's 36th consecutive season in the top-flight of Chinese football.

The season saw the club win the Chinese FA Super Cup.

== Summary ==
=== Pre-season ===
Prior to the beginning of the season in December 2025, several changes took place at the club. First, last season's interim manager Ramiro Amarelle announced his departure, and second, the club appointed German football administrator Matthias Brosamer as the club's sporting director, replacing long-time General Manager Li Ming.

On 8 January, Guoan announced former Sheffield United player and Tottenham Hotspur assistant coach Nick Montgomery as the team's new manager. On the same day, Chengdu Rongcheng announced the free transfer signing of Wang Ziming from Beijing Guoan. The club held a press conference on 12 January to formally introduce new sporting director Brosamer and new manager Montgomery. According to Brosamer, club president Zhou Jinhui delegated him and Montgomery full authority over transfer activities. On 14 January, Beijing Guoan announced the quadruple signing of Yue Tze Nam from Meizhou Hakka, Abduhamit Abdugheni from Changchun Yatai, Jia Feifan from Shandong Taishan, and Deng Jiefu from Dalian Yingbo. On the same day, contract extensions of club veterans Wang Gang and Chi Zhongguo were also announced.

The team gathered in Beijing on 15 January and departed for Haikou to commence its winter training camp starting 17 January. On 19 January, it was announced that Zhang Yuan, who announced his departure from Beijing Guoan at the end of last season, has joined defending league champions Shanghai Port on a free transfer. On 20 January, Chinese Super League club Zhejiang announced their signing of Fang Hao from Beijing Guoan. Guoan announced the arrival of three new coaching staff members on 26 January. Filipe Duarte da Silva Pedra and Andrew Thomson were appointed assistant coaches, and Hans-Peter Berger was appointed goalkeeping coach.

On 29 January, a joint anti-corruption taskforce between the Chinese FA, the Ministry of Public Security, and the General Administration of Sport of China announced that Guoan, after investigation, was found to have "violated sporting ethics, abandoned sportsmanship, and engaged in improper transactions to seek illegitimate benefits" in 2017 and 2021. The club, along with 12 other Chinese Super League and Chinese League One clubs, received varying degrees of points deductions in the 2026 season and fines. Guoan was deducted five points and fined ¥400,000. Later in the same day, the club issued a defiant statement on its social media account which read, "Heaven sees all! (Chinese: 人在做，天在看！头顶三尺有神明!)", without acknowledging or admitting to any wrongdoing. The statement was later deleted in its social media platforms.

On 29 January, Saudi Arabian club Al-Najma SC announced that it had signed Guga, marking his departure from Guoan. On 31 January, Guoan announced the free transfer signing of centre-back Guilherme Ramos from Hamburger SV. Also on 31 January, Guoan arranged a friendly with China League One side Nantong Zhiyun, with Guoan winning 2−1 thanks to a goal and an assist from loan returnee Hao Yucheng, and Fábio Abreu.

The team departed for Thailand on 3 February to commence its preseason training's second phase. On 6 February, Guoan announced the double signing of Béni Nkololo from Greek side Panetolikos and Wang Yu from Changchun Yatai. A day later, the club bid farewell to Michael Ngadeu-Ngadjui, who joined newly-promoted CSL side Chongqing Tonglianglong. Guoan played a friendly against fellow CSL club Shenzheng Peng City on 9 February. Guoan won 3–2 thanks to goals from Lin Liangming, Abreu, and Zhang Xizhe. Right-back He Yupeng was injured in the friendly with later reports confirming that he suffered a foot fracture and will be sidelined for extended periods. On 14 February, the club extended Abreu's contract until the end of 2027.

After a small break following the previous phase of winter training camp, the team regrouped for the next phase of pre-season preparation in Suzhou on 20 February. A day later, the club announced that Nebijan Muhmet has joined Henan on loan until the end of the 2026 season. On 23 February, Guoan played its last training match against Liaoning Tieren, winning 3–1. On 24 February, Guoan announced the signing of Boubacar Konté from Georgian club Dila Gori, and will wear the number 8 shirt.

=== March ===
The team travelled to neutural ground Nanjing Olympic Sports Center to play its first match of the season against Shanghai Port in the 2026 Chinese FA Super Cup. Guoan lined up in a 4-4-2 formation under new head coach Montgomery, and debuted a number of new signings. Just 20 seconds into the game, Zhang Yuning had a header on target that was saved by the opposition keeper. In the 31st minute, Sai Erjini'ao set Dawhan up for a long-range shot from outside the penalty area, allowing Guoan to lead 1–0. In the 84th minute, Nkololo assisted Cao Yongjing, who slotted the ball past the keeper with his left foot. Guoan won the match 2–0, lifting the Chinese FA Super Cup trophy for the first time since 2003. Dawhan was awarded the man of the match.

Beijing Guoan's CFA Super Cup winning line-up v Shanghai Port, 1 March 2026

Guoan's season league opener came on 8 March at Wuhan Three Towns. First-choice left and right backs Li Lei and Yue Tze Nam were still recovering from previous injuries, but the team managed. In the 44th minute, Wang Gang crossed from the right wing and Abreu leaped to head the ball into the net to set Guoan a goal up right before half time. In the 51st minute, Wang Gang and Zhang Yuning pressured Wuhan's keeper into an error, from which Zhang placed the ball into the empty net. Academy graduate and yongster Wei Jia'ao received his league debut for the club, substituting on for Béni Nkololo in the 81st minute. Guoan won the match 2–0.

On 11 March, China League One club Foshan Nanshi announced that Guoan's youngster Li Ruiyue has joined the club on a season-long loan.

On 14 March, Guoan played Shandong Taishan in their second league match of the campaign. Xie Wenneng took the lead for Shandong Taishan in the 49th minute, before Zhang Yuning equalised in the 86th minute. From a set piece, Cryzan reinstated Shandong's lead to 2–1, as they held on until full-time.

On 21 March, Workers' Stadium welcomed Guoan back at home for the season's home opener against Jing–Hu rivalry rivals Shanghai Shenhua. In the 23th minute, Zhang Yuning opened the scoring for Guoan, heading home a header from a cross by Nkolo. In the second half, Abduhamit gave away a free kick at the edge of the penalty arc, and Shinichi Chan converted the free kick to level the match for Shenhua. The 1–1 score held on until full time. The match welcomed 64,118 spectators, the second-highest of any Chinese Super League match in history.

=== April ===
On 4 April, Beijing Guoan travelled to Shenyang to face Chinese Super League newcomers Liaoning Tieren. Konté handled the ball in the Beijing Guoan box, and Guy Mbenza converted the penalty to make it 1–0 for the hosts. Right before half-time, Jeffinho doubled the lead for Liaoning Tieren, tapping in home a low cross from Mbenza. In the 56th minute, Abreu pulled one back for Beijing Guoan, scoring a header from Sai Erjini'ao. The matched ended 2–1 and Guoan sit 12th in the table on –1 points after four league matches.

Up next, Guoan welcomed league leaders Chengdu Rongcheng at home on 11 April. Before the match, the north sections of the stadium displayed a mosaic tifo depicting Fábio Abreu and Zhang Yuning. In the 63rd minute, Cao Yongjing crossed the ball to Zhang Yuning, who finished off with a header, putting Guoan 1–0 ahead. However, in the 84th minute, Liao Lisheng scored an equaliser from a corner. In the 94th minute, former Guoan footballer Wei Shihao scored the winner for Chengdu Rongcheng, securing an away 2–1 comeback win for the visitors. After five league games, Guoan sat in 13th of the league table, and entered a four-match winless streak.

On 17 April, Guoan played out a goalless 0–0 draw with Zhejiang away. With a league record of one win, two draws, and three losses, the most recent six matches had formed the worst performing start of any season in Beijing Guoan's Chinese Super League history.

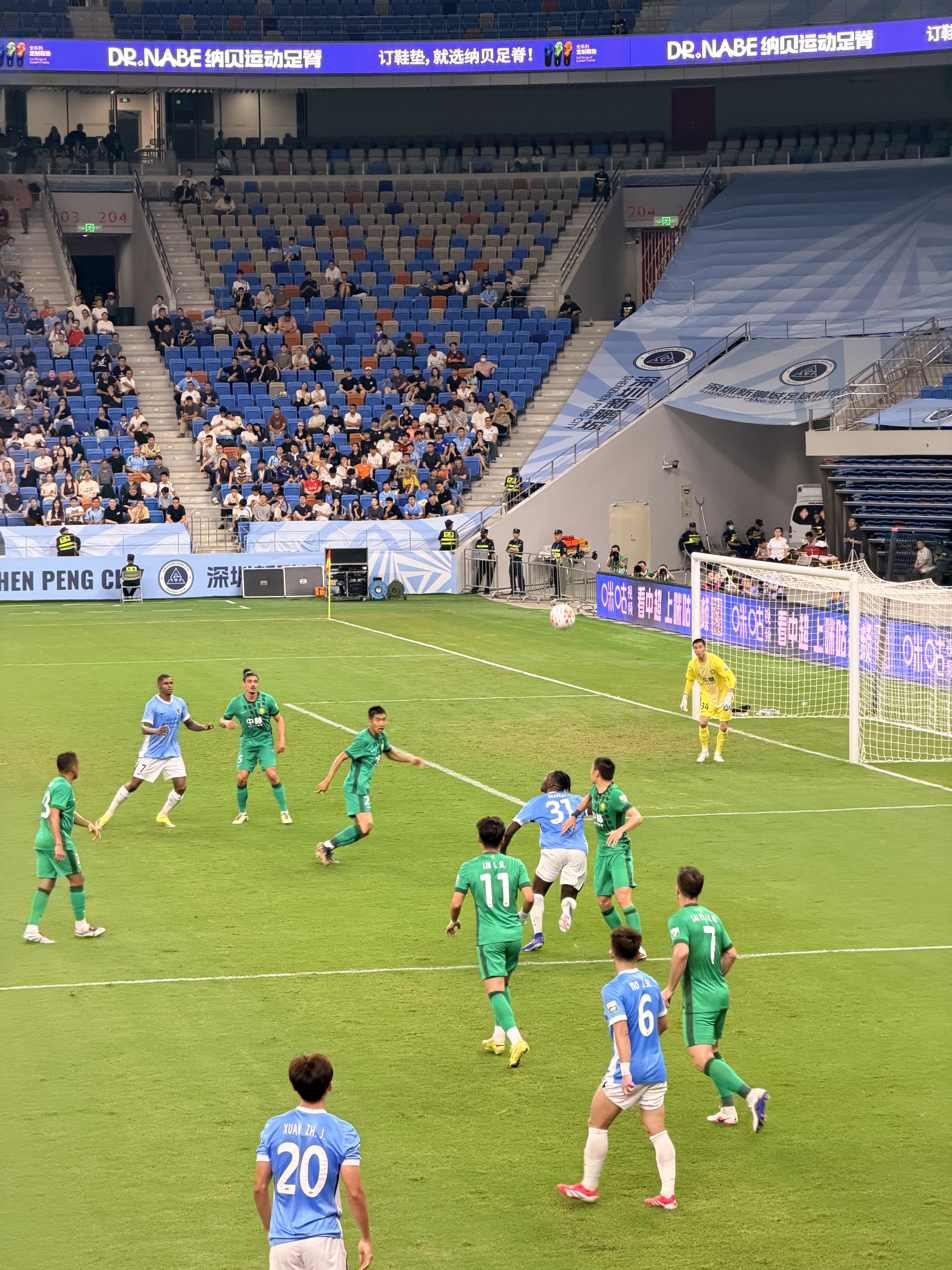
Beijing Guoan in action against Shenzhen Peng City on 21 April

Guoan travelled to play against Shenzhen Peng City on 21 April. Shenzhen sent the ball into Guoan's net in the 25th minute, but the goal was ruled out after video review as a Shenzhen player was deemed to have roughed Hou Sen. In the 89th minute, captain Zhang Xizhe scored from outside the box to give Guoan the lead and the ultimate victory, snapping a 5-game winless streak and sending the team up to 10th place. With the goal, Zhang has scored in 17 consecutive seasons for the club, and the goal was Zhang's 70th across all competition for Guoan.

On 24 April, the AFC confirmed that the 2026-27 AFC Champions League Elite would expand from 24 teams to 32, and the Chinese Super League was given a second direct qualification to the competition's league stage. Guoan, originally set to start in the qualifying rounds, was granted direct entry to the league stage.

Guoan hosted Tianjin Jinmen Tiger on 25 April. Guoan conceded two in the first half, but managed to level thanks to goals from Zhang Yuning and Lin Liangming by the 68th minute. However, Guoan failed to maintain the positive momentum and conceded two more, ending the game with a 2–4 defeat.

The team announced that Korean sport scientist Park Eun-kyu joined the club as the head of medical performance on 28 April.

=== May ===
Guoan's first game of the month came away at Yunnan Yukun on 2 May. Despite leading three separate times via goals from Zhang Yuning, Zhang Xizhe, and Sai Erjini'ao, the team conceded three goals and the game ended in a 3–3 draw that saw Guoan slip into 13th place with only one win in the last eight games.

On 6 May, Guoan returned home to face Dalian Yingbo. On the brink of half time, Guoan's Cao Yongjing stepped on Dalian's Isnik Alimi whilst attempting to avoid the latter's tackle, and was issued a red card. In the second half, Guilhermo Ramos' header from a corner marked the 1400th goal in Guoan's league history from a corner in the 54th minute with his first of the season. Four minutes later, Huang Shan's own goal added a second goal for Guoan. In the 62nd minute, Boubacar Konté won a penalty for Guoan. However, Fábio Abreu's attempt from the spot was saved by Huang Zihao. In the 65th minute, Bai Yang recovered a ball from Sai Erjini'ao to assist Lin Liangming to complete Guoan's 3–0 victory with ten men. With this win, Guoan jump to tenth in the league table.

On 10 May, Guoan hosted Shanghai Port. In the 45th minute, VAR ruled out Zhang Yuning's goal to give Shanghai Port a penalty due to a previous foul in the Beijing Guoan box in the immediate preceding sequence of play. Mateus Vital converted the penalty to give Shanghai Port a 1–0 lead before half-time. In the second half, Abreu received a through ball from Zhang Yuning and equalised for Beijing Guoan. In the 62nd minute, Guilhermo Ramos was dispossessed at the back, and Leonardo put Shanghai Port back in the lead. In the 86th minute, Wu Lei handled the ball inside Shanghai Port's penalty area, and Zhang Xizhe leveled the match to 2–2 with a penalty. Immediately from kick-off, Zhang Yuning scored a first-touch volley into the top left corner, however, the goal was disallowed as Zhang Yuning was in an offside position. After the 2–2 draw, Beijing Guoan fall into 11th place.

Guoan's 3-game campaign at home concluded against Qingdao Hainiu on 15 May. The team established a 3–0 lead within 34 minutes: Zhang Yuning scored his 7th goal of the season in the 12th minute from an Abreu assist, Yue Tze Nam volleyed his first goal for the club from outside the box in the 24th minute, and Zhang Xizhe converted a penalty in the 34th from an opponent hand ball. Substitute Cao Yongjing extended Guoan's lead to 4–0 in the 64th minute with Zhang Yuning turning to the assisting role. In the 67th minute, a failed Hou Sen attempt to claim a high ball gifted Hainiu a goal. In the 94th minute, Wang Yu's mistake within Guoan's half led to another goal against Guoan. Ultimately, Guoan saw the game out 4–2 and rose to 8th place on the league standings. FIFA's Secretary General Mattias Grafström was in attendance for the match.

On 19 May, Guoan went on the road to face Qingdao West Coast. In the 62nd minute, Qingdao West Coast's Rezende was sent off for the denial of a goal-scoring opportunity foul on Abreu. However, it was also Qingdao West Coast that took the lead. Davidson received Nelson da Luz's cross in the 73rd minute, and bicycle-kicked it into the bottom right corner. Five minutes later, Lin Liangming equalised for Guoan with a header in the 78th minute, keeping the score 1–1 until full-time.

On 21 May, the Chinese FA announced another round of sanctions as a result of ongoing anti-corruption investigations into Chinese football. Former Guoan general manager Li Ming and former goalkeeping coach He Zhengyuan received 5-year bans from footballing activities. Li was found to have engaged in bribery and conducted improper financial transactions for profit.

On 23 May, Guoan returned home to face Henan. In the 27th minute, Sai Erijini'ao's corner found Dawhan, who put Guoan 1–0 ahead. Late in the second half, Abreu cleared the ball into his own net in the 78th minute, putting Henan level at 1–1. Nine minutes later, Gustavo received a low cross from Bruno Nazário, and completed the away 2–1 comeback for Henan. With this loss, Beijing Guoan suffered the home league loss to Henan in history, and dropped to 13th place.

Guoan travelled to play Chongqing Tonglianglong on 30 May. In the 8th minute, Abreu was taken down by former Guoan player Michael Ngadeu-Ngadjui in the penalty area, but the referee did not rule on the incident following video assistant review. In the 34th minute, Abreu chested down a Zhang Xizhe cross from a free kick and scored, giving Guoan a 1–0 lead. Switching sides in the second half, Guoan conceded twice, falling to a long ball from behind in the 52nd minute and a corner in the 68th. The team, however, managed to turn the game around. In the 82nd minute, Sai Erjini'ao slid a shot through Chongqing's keeper while falling to the ground, and Abreu capitalized on a Chongqing goalkeeping mistake to retake the lead for Guoan in the 85th minute. The match ended in a 3–2 victory for Guoan, sending the team up to 10th place.

=== June ===
Guoan's CFA Cup campaign for the season began on 19 June with an away game in the fourth round against Guangdong GZ-Power. Lin Liangming scored twice in the 24th and 48th minute, and missed a penalty in the 70th minute. GZ-Power managed to pull a goal back, but Guoan managed to win the game 2–1 and advanced to the next round.

On 27 June, Guoan faced Wuhan Three Towns at the Workers' Stadium. In the 10th minute, Zhang Xizhe was replaced by Sai Erjini'ao due to an injury. In the 66th minute, Ramos gave Guoan the only goal in a 1–0 victory, rising high to receive a Sai Erjini'ao corner with a header. He Yupeng and Nkololo both made a return to the pitch, after recovering from long sustaining injuries. Toward the end of the match, Konté and Gustavo Sauer of Wuhan Three Towns sparked argument between their conduct. With this win, Guoan climb to seventh in the league table.

=== July ===
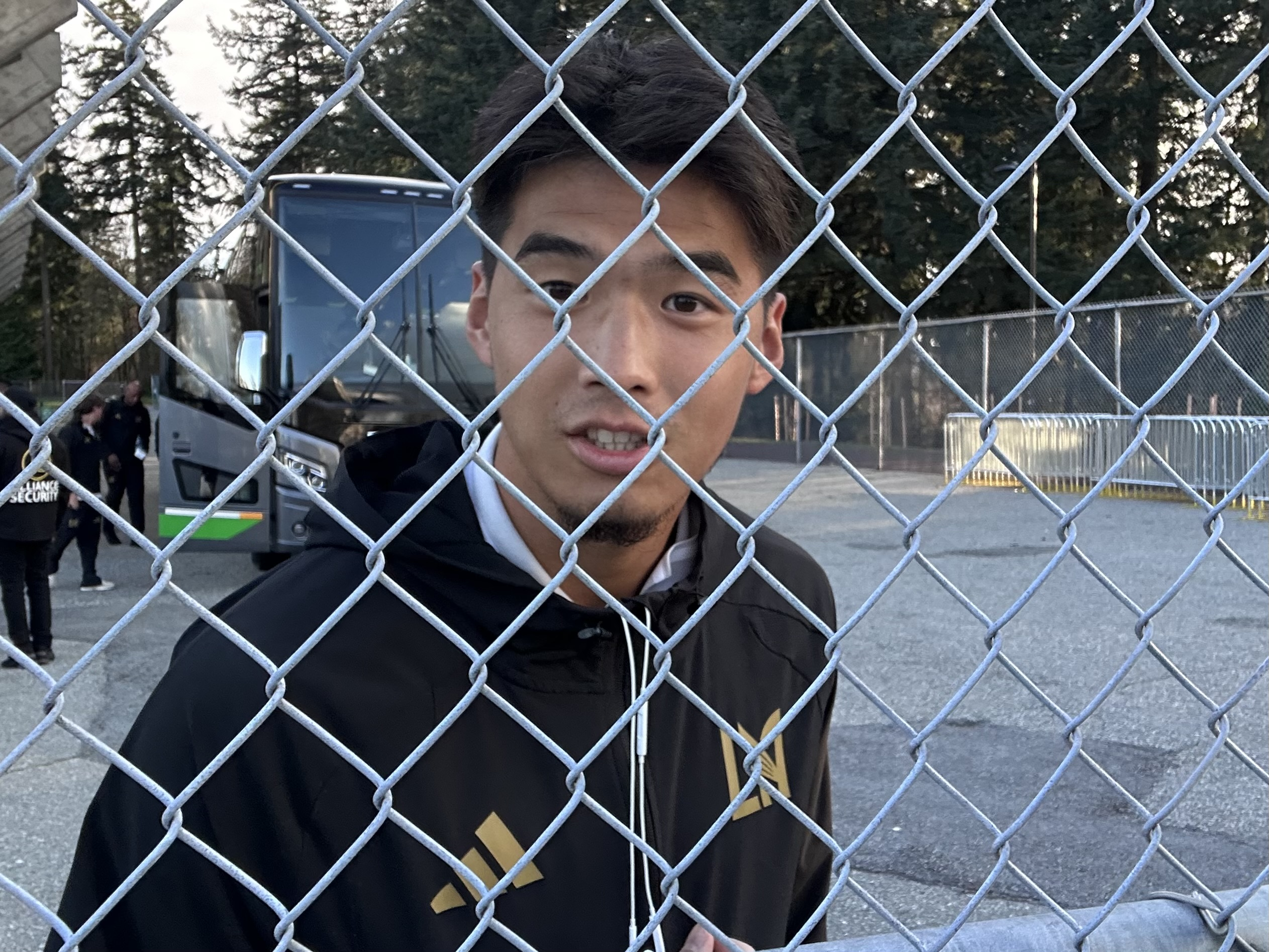
Liu Shaoziyang in Los Angeles FC 2 colours, three months before signing for Beijing Guoan

On 1 July, Beijing Guoan announced the signing of Los Angeles FC 2 goalkeeper Liu Shaoziyang. On 3 July, three departures from Guoan were announced. Feng Boxuan joined fellow Chinese Super League side Dalian Yingbo on a free transfer, Jiang Wenhao was loaned to China League One club Shaanxi Union, and Wei Jia'ao along with Ma Longjian was loaned to China League Two club BIT.

On 4 July, Guoan hosted rivals Shandong Taishan. In the 12th minute, Zhang Yuning seized an opportunity in a loose ball situation and put the ball into the back of the net. However, the goal was disallowed due to the referee's premature whistle. In the 23rd minute, Zheng Zheng brought down Nkololo at the edge of the box, and was sent off with a direct red card for the denial of an obvious goalscoring opportunity. Despite the on-field player advantage, it took Guoan until the 74th minute to break down the ten-men Shandong Taishan defence, as a well-worked build-up was finished off by Sai Erjini'ao. In the 81st minute, Lin Liangming doubled Guoan's lead to make it 2–0. With Guoan recording 39 shots on goal and Shandong goalkeeper Wang Dalei registering nine saves, Shandong Taishan held onto only a two-goal deficit. After the win, Guoan jump ahead of Shandong Taishan into sixth place.

On 10 July, it was announced that the Jing–Hu rivalry match against Shanghai Shenhua was postponed due to the expectation of the landing of Typhoon Bavi.

On 15 July, Guoan goalkeeper Zhang Jianzhi was loaned to China League One side Guangxi Hengchen until the end of the season.

Guoan played Liaoning Tieren at home on 17 July. Konté assisted Sai Erjini'ao for a goal in the 24th minute, but Liaoning's Takahiro Kunimoto scored in the 57th minute to level the game. The score remained unchanged at the end, with both teams sharing the point. The match was Abreu's 100th for the club, and Fan Shuangjie's first match of the season.

On 21 July, Guoan were on the road to play against China League Two opposition Dalian Kewei in the 2026 Chinese FA Cup fifth round. After a penalty decision, a Cao Yongjing goal, and a Zhang Yuning goal, all overturned by VAR, Jia Feifan opened the scoring for Guoan in the stoppage time in the first half. In the 66th minute, Lin Liangming assisted Zhang Yuning to score Guoan's second. After a poor clearance from Abduhamit, Dalian Kewei pulled one back with Ge Yuxiang in the 87th minute. However, the 2–1 scoreline was enough to send Guoan through to the quarter-final.

On deadline day of the summer transfer window, Guoan announced the free signings of Tunisian midfielder Jeremy Dudziak from Hertha BSC and Congolese forward Chadrac Akolo from Thep Xanh Nam Dinh, who will play exclusively for the club in the 2026–27 AFC Champions League Elite. The following day, Guoan released an updated first-team league roster which showed Uroš Spajić as the fifth registered league foreign player for the latter half of the season, replacing Béni Nkololo. China League Two club Hubei Istar also announced the signing of Guoan defender Zhang Yixuan on loan on this day, although he had already made his debut for Hubei Istar one month earlier. Wang Zihao was also loaned out during the transfer window.

Guoan traveled to face league leaders Chengdu Rongcheng in its last game of the month on 26 July. Despite injuries, Zhang Yuning scored a double with goals from the 52nd and 70th minute. However, defensive errors allowed Chengdu to score two late in the game, leaving Guoan with a 2–2 draw.

=== August ===
Guoan returned home to play Zhejiang on 1 August. In the 6th minute, Spajić was fouled in the opposition box and Guoan was awarded a penalty, which Abreu finished for a 1–0 lead. Four minutes later, Zhejiang leveled the game through a counterattack. In the 82nd minute, substitute Sai Erjini'ao assisted fellow substitute Zhang Xizhe for a curler into the far corner. Guoan held on for a 2–1 victory at home, elevating the team into 7th place.

Guoan continued at home against Shenzhen Peng City on 7 August. In the 16th minute, Abreu hit the crossbar from a Cao Yongjing cross, and Zhang Yuning was quick to the rebound to give Guoan a 1–0 lead. In the 26th minute, Shenzhen's Tim Chow deflected a Guoan corner into his own net, allowing Guoan to enter the break with a 2–0 advantage. In the 51st minute, Zhang Yuning squared a pass on a counterattack to Dawhan, who powered the shot with his left foot into the Shenzhen goal. In the 79th minute, Dawhan's header from a corner was saved, but Abreu scored after Shenzhen's goalkeeper failed to gain control of the ball. Guoan ended the game with a 4–0 victory and remain 7 games unbeaten. Jiang Zicheng, 18-year-old youngster from Guoan's academy and son of Guoan official Jiang Xiaojun, made his league and home debut in the match, replacing Bai Yang in the 84th minute.

Guoan went on the road to play neighboring rivals Tianjing Jinmen Tiger on 15 August. Within 53 minutes, Guoan scored 4 unanswered goals with two from Abreu, one from Dawhan, and another from Cao Yongjing. Tianjin scored in the 69th and the 86th minute to pulled two goals back, but Guoan emerged victorious 4–2. The team's streak without a league loss extends to 8 games, and sit fifth in the league table.

On 18 August, the draw was made for the 2026–27 AFC Champions League Elite league stage, which would see Guoan begin their continental campaign in September.

The same evening, Guoan visited Shanghai Shenhua in the reverse league fixture of the Jing–Hu rivalry. In the 42nd minute, Sai Erjini'ao whipped a cross into the box, and Guilherme Ramos scrambled the ball into the net in his second attempt on goal, putting Guoan 1–0 up at the half-time whistle. In the 73rd minute, a counter-attacking opportunity saw Abreu find a pass wide to Cao Yongjing, who finished off with a side-footed shot. In the 86th minute, a long ball from Jia Feifan found Zhang Yuning, who squared it to Zhang Xizhe to seal the game at 3–0. With this victory, Guoan climb to second place in the league table after a four-game winning streak.

On 22 August, Guoan hosted Yunnan Yukun to close out a run of three closely scheduled matches in eight days. In the 36th minute, Dawhan received a nod from Abreu to complete a touch succeeded by a bicycle kick to give Guoan a one-goal advantage. Early in the second half, Zhang Yuning doubled the lead, heading the ball into an empty net. In the 58th minute, eighteen-year-old Bunyamin Abdusalam scored a solo goal to pull one back, dribbling past Guoan defenders starting from the halfway line to a left-footed curler at the edge of the box. Seven minutes later, Oscar Maritu equalised the game at 2–2. Sai Erjini'ao briefly took the lead for Guoan in the 69th minute, but the goal was cancelled by a stoppage time Yunnan Yukun equaliser from Alexandru Ioniță. With the 3–3 draw, Guoan managed to stay in second place.

On 28 August, Guoan topped off August with a trip to face Dalian Yingbo. Dalian scored two disallowed goals in the first half, but it was Zhang Yuning for Guoan who opened the scoring in the 43rd minute. De Erjiaduo equalised for Dalian Yingbo in the 48th minute, putting the game at 1–1 until the final whistle. Towards the end of the match, a physical altercation ensued, which resulted in Guoan's Dawhan receiving a red card.

=== September ===
On 1 September, Guoan hosted China League Two side Lanzhou Longyuan Athletic in the quarter-finals of the CFA Cup. In the 26th minute, Zhang Xizhe assisted Deng Jiefu with a through pass to score his first senior goal, putting Guoan 1–0 up until half-time. In the 48th minute, Lanzhou's cross from Lu Jianchen found the back of Guoan's net, bringing the tie level. It took Guoan until the 86th minute to regain the advantage, after Lanzhou goalkeeper Mu Qianyu spilled a ball in the path of Zhang Yuning who slotted the ball into the empty net. In the sixth minute of stoppage time, Cao Yongjing finished off the tie at 3–1 for the hosts, who would progress to a semi-final at home.

On 5 September, Guoan travelled to face Shanghai Port. Fielding only a single foreign player, Guoan held onto a resilient 0–0 draw, with Shanghai Port taking twenty-one shots throughout the match.

Guoan kicked off their 2026–27 AFC Champions League Elite campaign in the league stage on 15 September, against the Pohang Steelers. Chadrac Akolo and Jeremy Dudziak, both Guoan's AFC Champions League Elite-only players, would both make their debuts for Guoan this match. Béni Nkololo also made a comeback after being deregistered in the summer player registration window. Within two minutes of kick-off, Akolo broke through Pohang's defence to draw first blood in the game, scoring his first goal for Guoan on debut. Pohang equalised four minutes later through a Jakob Tranziska penalty, after Deng Jiefu's clearance attempt brought down a Pohang player in Guoan's box. Guoan found an immediate response, with Zhang Xizhe picking up the scraps in the 12th minute. In the first minute of the second half, Dudziak scored his first Guoan goal to seal the match at 3–1, picking up all three points.

=== October ===
On 9 October, Guoan travelled to face Qingdao Hainiu in matchday 27 of the Chinese Super League. Abreu opened the scoring from the penalty spot in the 5th minute, before Sai Erjini'ao doubled Guoan's lead in the 32nd minute. Abreu scored his second goal of the match in the 62nd minute, converting a pass from Zhang Yuning to cement a 3–0 victory for Guoan. In the 71st minute, Wang Gang came on as a substitute for Yue Tze Nam. At 37 years and 234 days, he passed Zhou Ting to become the oldest player to appear in a match for Guoan. The defeat also confirmed Qingdao Hainiu's relegation from the Chinese Super League.

In mid-week on 13 October, Beijing Guoan defeated Buriram United 1–0 away in the second matchday of the 2026–27 AFC Champions League Elite league stage. The match remained goalless until the 79th minute, when Abreu scored the winning goal from off the bench, receiving a Lin Liangming pass, to secure all three points for Guoan. The victory extended Guoan's perfect start to the competition.

On 18 October, Guoan hosted Qingdao West Coast at home. Fouled by former Guoan player Samir Memišević in the 16th minute, Abreu was forced off the pitch in what would be a broken right fibula. In the 78th minute, Sai Erjini'ao's corner found Zhang Yuning to head home a 1–0 victory for the home side.

In the penultimate league gameweek on 24 October, Guoan visited Henan for their final run-in. Relegation threatened Henan stunned Guoan, scoring three goals in the first half, first with Bruno Nazário in the 20th minute, then with two goals from Gustavo in the 34th and 42nd minutes. In the second half, Guoan brought on Zhang Xizhe and Uroš Spajić. In the 65th minute, Zhang Xizhe picked up the scraps to pull one back for Guoan. Deng Jiefu scored four minutes later for his first Chinese Super League goal. In the 73rd minute, Lin Liangming received a long ball from Zhang Xizhe to level the scoreline at 3–3. In the 81st minute, Guoan completed a comeback in the span of sixteen minutes, through a Zhang Yuning header from a cross from Lin Liangming. With the 4–3 victory, Guoan keep their hopes for second place in the league alive.

In matchday three of the AFC Champions League Elite league stage, Guoan hosted Jeonbuk Hyundai Motors on 27 October. Within two minutes, Bruno Mota of Jeonbuk opened the scoring, leaving Guoan trailing by one. In the 34th minute, Guoan found a response with Jeremy Dudziak, who slotted the ball into the far corner from a corner to equalise at 1–1. In the second half, Wang Gang reacted quickly to a loose ball and put Guoan 2–1 up in the 52nd minute. Jeonbuk found an equaliser via Lee Yeong-jae with a 64th-minute goal to complete a 2–2 draw, with Guoan sitting in fifth place after the match.

=== November ===
On 3 November, Guoan faced Thai side Port in the AFC Champions League Elite away at True BG Stadium. Guoan opened the scoring through Akolo in the fifth minute, before Jude Soonsup-Bell scored two in quick succession to give Port the lead in the 19th mminute. Guoan's equaliser at 2–2 came in the 23rd minute through Dawhan's header, before Bordin Phala scored Port's third in the 29th minute. In the 37th minute, Guoan found another equaliser, after Dudziak's shot forced an own goal from Noboru Shimura. Four minutes later, Guoan reclaimed the lead, with Dawhan grabbing his second of the match to help them into the half-time interval with a 4–3 lead. In the 58th minute, Port's pass caught out the Guoan defence, and Guoan's Guilherme Ramos was sent off for a denial of an obvious goal-scoring opportunity. Following the red card, Port converted the player advantage into a goal advantage, with Bordin completing a hat-trick after goals in the 78th minute and the 81st minute. In stoppage time, Port's Teerasak Poeiphimai found the back of the net twice more, handing a 7–4 loss to the visitors.

On 8 November, Guoan capped off the league campaign on final day with a home match against Chongqing Tonglianglong. Zhang Yuning netted his fifteenth goal of the season in the 80th minute, giving Guoan a 1–0 victory. Guoan finished the league in third place on 50 points, behind league champions Dalian Yingbo and runners-up Chengdu Rongcheng. With 15 wins and 10 draws, Beijing Guoan would have been crowned league champions, had there not been points deductions to any of the nine CSL teams at the beginning of the league season.

== First team ==
=== First-team coaching staff ===
Position	Name	Nationality	Date of birth (age)	Last club	Ref.
Manager	Nick Montgomery	Scotland	28 Oct 1981 (age 45)	(England) Nottingham Forest (as assistant coach)	
Assistant coaches	Andy Thomson	Scotland		(United States) South Carolina Surf Soccer Club (as academy director)	
Assistant coaches	Filipe Duarte da Silva Pedro	Portugal	10 Jun 1987 (age 39)	(Tanzania) Young Africans S.C. (as assistant coach)	
Assistant coaches	Sui Dongliang	China	24 Sep 1977 (age 49)	(China) Beijing Guoan (as caretaker manager)	
Assistant coaches	Tao Wei	China	11 Mar 1978 (age 48)	(China) Beijing Guoan (as player)	
Head of goalkeeping	Jörg Stiel	Switzerland	3 Mar 1968 (age 58)	(Switzerland) Grasshoppers (as goalkeeping coach)	
Goalkeeper coach	Liu Peng	China	19 Jul 1982 (age 44)		
Fitness coach	Javier Poveda Leal	Spain	24 Sept 1983 (age 43)	(Spain) Las Palmas (as fitness coach)	
Fitness coach	Zhen Kaixin	China			

=== First-team squad ===
As of 22 July 2026

Note: Flags indicate national team as defined under FIFA eligibility rules; some limited exceptions apply. Players may hold more than one non-FIFA nationality.

No.	Pos.	Nation	Player
2	DF	CHN	Wu Shaocong
3	DF	CHN	He Yupeng
4	DF	CHN	Li Lei
5	DF	POR	Guilherme Ramos
6	MF	CHN	Chi Zhongguo
7	MF	CHN	Sai Erjini'ao (Note: Serginho became a naturalised Chinese citizen after joining Beijing Guoan; his official Chinese name was confirmed as Sai Erjini'ao)
8	MF	MLI	Boubacar Konté
9	FW	CHN	Zhang Yuning
10	MF	CHN	Zhang Xizhe (captain)
11	FW	CHN	Lin Liangming
17	FW	CHN	Yang Liyu
18	DF	CHN	Wang Yu
20	FW	FRA	Béni Nkololo
21	DF	HKG	Yue Tze Nam
22	GK	CHN	Han Jiaqi
23	MF	BRA	Dawhan
24	DF	CHN	Abduhamit Abdugheni
25	DF	SRB	Uroš Spajić
26	DF	CHN	Bai Yang

No.	Pos.	Nation	Player
27	DF	CHN	Wang Gang
28	MF	TUN	Jeremy Dudziak
29	FW	ANG	Fábio Abreu
30	DF	CHN	Fan Shuangjie
31	GK	CHN	Liu Shaoziyang
32	MF	CHN	Wang Size
33	GK	CHN	Nureli Abbas
34	GK	CHN	Hou Sen
36	MF	CHN	Jia Feifan
37	FW	CHN	Cao Yongjing
41	MF	CHN	Cheng Xi
43	MF	CHN	Xia Xiaoyu
47	DF	CHN	Deng Jiefu
50	MF	CHN	Zhang Haoran
55	DF	CHN	Luo Zixiang
57	MF	CHN	Liu Junze
58	FW	CHN	Jiang Zicheng
59	MF	CHN	Chen Kangyue
77	FW	COD	Chadrac Akolo

==== Reserves squad ====
As of 22 July 2026

Note: Flags indicate national team as defined under FIFA eligibility rules; some limited exceptions apply. Players may hold more than one non-FIFA nationality.

No.	Pos.	Nation	Player
14	GK	CHN	Lu Tongyun
42	DF	CHN	Lin Hanqi
45	FW	CHN	Ma Mingyang

No.	Pos.	Nation	Player
—	DF	CHN	Li Shanghan
—	GK	PAR	Zheng Tuluo (Note: Zheng became a naturalised Chinese citizen before joining Beijing Guoan)

==== Out on loan ====
As of 22 July 2026

Note: Flags indicate national team as defined under FIFA eligibility rules; some limited exceptions apply. Players may hold more than one non-FIFA nationality.

No.	Pos.	Nation	Player
19	DF	CHN	Nebijan Muhmet (at Henan until 31 December 2026)
28	MF	CHN	Li Ruiyue (at Foshan Nanshi until 31 December 2026)
35	MF	CHN	Jiang Wenhao (at Shaanxi Union until 31 December 2026)
38	MF	CHN	Wei Jia'ao (at BIT until 31 December 2026)
39	GK	CHN	Zhang Jianzhi (at Guangxi Hengchen until 31 December 2026)
—	DF	CHN	Hao Yucheng (at Jiangxi Dingnan United until 31 December 2026)
—	FW	CHN	Wang Zihao (at BIT until 31 December 2026)
—	DF	CHN	Zhang Yixuan (at Hubei Istar until 31 December 2026)

== Transfers ==
=== In ===
#	Pos.	Player	Age	Moving from	Type	Transfer Window	Ends	Fee	Source
	DF	(China) Hao Yucheng	21	(China) Qingdao Red Lions	Loan return	Winter		Free	
	MF	(China) Shi Yucheng	24	(China) Shenzhen Juniors	Loan return	Winter		Free	
	DF	(China) Zhang Yixuan	21	(China) Qingdao Red Lions	Loan return	Winter		Free	
24	DF	(China) Abduhamit Abdugheni	27	(China) Changchun Yatai	Transfer	Winter		Free	
47	DF	(China) Deng Jiefu	18	(China) Dalian Yingbo	Transfer	Winter		Free	
36	MF	(China) Jia Feifan	25	(China) Shandong Taishan	Transfer	Winter		Free	
21	DF	(Hong Kong) Yue Tze Nam	27	(China) Meizhou Hakka	Transfer	Winter		Free	
5	DF	(Portugal) Guilherme Ramos	28	(Germany) Hamburger SV	Transfer	Winter	2027	¥810K	
20	FW	(France) Béni Nkololo	29	(Greece) Panetolikos	Transfer	Winter	2027	¥810K	
18	DF	(China) Wang Yu	23	(China) Changchun Yatai	Transfer	Winter		¥260K	
8	MF	(Mali) Boubacar Konté	24	(Georgia (country)) Dila Gori	Transfer	Winter	2028	¥5.3M	
31	GK	(China) Liu Shaoziyang	22	(United States) Los Angeles FC 2	Transfer	Summer		Free	
	FW	(Democratic Republic of the Congo) Chadrac Akolo	31	(Vietnam) Thep Xanh Nam Dinh	Transfer	Summer		Free	
28	MF	(Tunisia) Jeremy Dudziak	30	(Germany) Hertha BSC	Transfer	Summer		Free	

=== Out ===
#	Pos.	Player	Age	Moving to	Type	Transfer Window	Fee	Source
20	FW	(China) Wang Ziming	29	(China) Chengdu Rongcheng	End of contract	Winter	Free	
21	MF	(China) Zhang Yuan	28	(China) Shanghai Port	End of contract	Winter	Free	
8	MF	(Portugal) Guga	28	(Saudi Arabia) Al-Najma SC	End of contract	Winter	Free	
18	FW	(China) Fang Hao	26	(China) Zhejiang	Transfer	Winter	¥5M	
43	FW	(China) Wang Yuxiang	20	(China) Shaanxi Union	End of contract	Winter	Free	
5	DF	(Cameroon) Michael Ngadeu-Ngadjui	35	(China) Chongqing Tonglianglong	End of contract	Winter	Free	
19	DF	(China) Nebijan Muhmet	24	(China) Henan	Loan	Winter	–	
	MF	(China) Shi Yucheng	24	(China) Shenzhen Juniors	Transfer	Winter	Free	
	DF	(China) Hao Yucheng	21	(China) Jiangxi Dingnan United	Loan	Winter	–	
28	MF	(China) Li Ruiyue	19	(China) Foshan Nanshi	Loan	Winter	–	
	DF	(China) Zhang Yixuan	21	(China) Hubei Istar	Loan	Summer	–	
35	MF	(China) Jiang Wenhao	26	(China) Shaanxi Union	Loan	Summer	–	
16	DF	(China) Feng Boxuan	29	(China) Dalian Yingbo	Transfer	Summer	Free	
38	MF	(China) Wei Jia'ao	20	(China) BIT	Loan	Summer	–	
	DF	(China) Ma Longjian	21	(China) BIT	Loan	Summer	–	
39	GK	(China) Zhang Jianzhi	26	(China) Guangxi Hengchen	Loan	Summer	–	
	FW	(China) Wang Zihao	19	(China) BIT	Loan	Summer	–	

== Friendlies ==
=== Pre-season ===
31 January 2026 Friendly	Beijing Guoan	2–1	(China) Nantong Zhiyun	Haikou, Hainan
	Abreu; Hao Yucheng		Liu Ye

6 February 2026 Friendly	Beijing Guoan	1–1	(South Korea) Hwaseong	Bangkok, Thailand
	Lin Liangming

9 February 2026 Friendly	Beijing Guoan	3–2	(China) Shenzhen Peng City	Bangkok, Thailand
	Lin Liangming; Abreu; Zhang Xizhe		Wesley; Chow

13 February 2026 Friendly	Beijing Guoan	2–2	(China) Wuhan Three Towns	Bangkok, Thailand
	Abreu; Lin Liangming

23 February 2026 Friendly	Beijing Guoan	3–1	(China) Liaoning Tieren	Suzhou, Jiangsu
15:00 UTC+8	Abduhamit; Sai Erjini'ao; Yue Tze Nam		Tian Yuda

== Competitions ==
=== Overview ===
Competition	First match	Last match	Starting round	Final position	Record							
Competition	First match	Last match	Starting round	Final position	Pld	W	D	L	GF	GA	GD	Win %
Chinese Super League	8 March	8 November	Matchday 1	Third place	30	15	10	5	58	36	+22	50.00
Chinese FA Cup	19 June	TBD	Fourth Round	TBD	3	3	0	0	7	3	+4	100.00
Chinese FA Super Cup	1 March 2026		Final	Winners	1	1	0	0	2	0	+2	100.00
2026–27 AFC Champions League Elite	15 September	TBD	League stage	TBD	4	2	1	1	10	10	+0	50.00
Total					38	21	11	6	77	49	+28	55.26

Last updated: 8 November 2026
Source: Soccerway

=== Chinese Super League ===
Beijing Guoan's 2026 Chinese Super League season commenced in March and concluded in November for a total of 30 matchdays.

==== Results summary ====
Overall								Home						Away					
Pld	W	D	L	GF	GA	GD	Pts	W	D	L	GF	GA	GD	W	D	L	GF	GA	GD
30	15	10	5	58	36	+22	50	8	4	3	29	18	+11	7	6	2	29	18	+11

Source: ESPN
The team had 5 points deducted for violation of sports ethics and loss of sportsmanship, engaging in improper transactions to seek illegitimate benefits.

==== Results by round ====
Round	1	2	3	4	5	6	7	8	9	10	11	12	13	14	15	16	17	19	20	21	22	23	18^{1}	24	25	26	27	28	29	30
Ground	A	A	H	A	H	A	A	H	A	H	H	H	A	H	A	H	H	A	H	A	H	H	A	H	A	A	A	H	A	H
Result	W	L	D	L	L	D	W	L	D	W	D	W	D	L	W	W	W	D	D	W	W	W	W	D	D	D	W	W	W	W
Position	8	13	12	13	13	13	10	11	13	10	11	8	9	13	10	7	6	7	8	7	6	5	2	2	2	3	3	3	3	3

Source: Competitive matches
A = Away; H = Home; W = Win; D = Draw; L = Loss
Notes:
- ^{1} Matchday 18 (v. Shanghai Shenhua) was postponed due to the landing of the Typhoon Bavi.

==== League table ====
Pos	Team	Pld	W	D	L	GF	GA	GD	Pts	Qualification or relegation
1	Dalian Yingbo (C)	30	16	4	10	49	44	+5	52 (Note: Dalian Yingbo are ahead of Chengdu Rongcheng on head-to-head points: Dalian Yingbo 6, Chengdu Rongcheng 0)	Qualification for AFC Champions League Elite league stage
2	Chengdu Rongcheng	30	15	7	8	53	38	+15	52	Qualification for AFC Champions League Two group stage
3	Beijing Guoan (Note: Beijing Guoan had 5 points deducted for violation of sports ethics and loss of sportsmanship, engaging in improper transactions to seek illegitimate benefits.)	30	15	10	5	58	36	+22	50	
4	Shandong Taishan (Note: Shandong Taishan had 6 points deducted for violation of sports ethics and loss of sportsmanship, engaging in improper transactions to seek illegitimate benefits.)	30	16	5	9	60	49	+11	47	
5	Shanghai Port (Note: Shanghai Port had 5 points deducted for violation of sports ethics and loss of sportsmanship, engaging in improper transactions to seek illegitimate benefits.)	30	14	8	8	56	37	+19	45	

Source: Soccerway
Rules for classification:
- During season: 1) Points; 2) Head-to-head points; 3) Head-to-head goal difference; 4) Head-to-head goals scored; 5) Goal difference; 6) Goals scored; 7) Rankings in the previous season. (Rules 2 to 4 are only applied when teams concerned have finished both/all the matches against others.)
- After season: 1) Points; 2) Head-to-head points; 3) Head-to-head goal difference; 4) Head-to-head goals scored; 5) Goal difference; 6) Goals scored; 7) Disciplinary points (yellow card = 1 point, red card = 3 points); 8) Drawing of lots.
  (C) Champions
  Notes:

==== Matches ====
8 March 2026 1	Wuhan Three Towns	0–2	Beijing Guoan	Wuhan
19:00 UTC+8		Report	Nkololo (yellow card) 40'; Abreu 45'; Zhang Yuning 52'; Abduhamit (yellow card) 73'	Stadium: Wuhan Sports Center Stadium; Attendance: 21,679; Referee: Gan Shuran; Assistant referees: Sun Kai; Xi Fei; Fourth official: Zhang Chao

14 March 2026 2	Shandong Taishan	2–1	Beijing Guoan	Jinan
15:30 UTC+8	Cryzan (yellow card) 21', (goal) 88'; Li Yuanyi (yellow card) 39'; Xie Wenneng 49'; Madruga (yellow card) 56'	Report	Ramos (yellow card) 28'; Zhang Yuning 86'	Stadium: Jinan Olympic Sports Center Stadium; Attendance: 45,069; Referee: Memetjan Ahmet; Assistant referees: Ma Ji; Liu Xing; Fourth official: Xiong Xing

21 March 2026 3	Beijing Guoan	1–1	Shanghai Shenhua	Beijing
15:30 UTC+8	Zhang Yuning 23'; Abreu (yellow card) 44'; Abduhamit (yellow card) 66'	Report	Wang Shilong (yellow card) 45+3'; Chan 68'; Gao Tianyi (yellow card) 74'; Yang Zexiang (yellow card) 85'	Stadium: Workers' Stadium; Attendance: 64,118; Referee: Ma Ning; Assistant referees: Cao Yi; Guan Changliang; Fourth official: Wan Tao

4 April 2026 4	Liaoning Tieren	2–1	Beijing Guoan	Shenyang
15:30 UTC+8	Han Rongze (yellow card) 2'; Mbenza 17' (pen.); Jeffinho 44'	Report	Abreu 56'; Abduhamit (yellow card) 62'; Nkololo (yellow card) 86'	Stadium: Tiexi Stadium; Attendance: 38,536; Referee: Zhen Wei; Assistant referees: Wang Xihong; Shi Qiang; Fourth official: Sun Shengyu

12 April 2026 5	Beijing Guoan	1–2	Chengdu Rongcheng	Beijing
19:35 UTC+8	Zhang Yuning 63'; Konté (yellow card) 82'	Report	Wei Shihao (yellow card) 14', (goal) 90+4'; Hu Hetao (yellow card) 31'; Matheus Jussa (yellow card) 42'; Liao Lisheng 84', (yellow card) 88'	Stadium: Workers' Stadium; Attendance: 53,033; Referee: Wang Jing; Assistant referees: Guo Jingtao; Luo Zheng; Fourth official: Ma Yunkun

17 April 2026 6	Zhejiang	0–0	Beijing Guoan	Hangzhou
20:00 UTC+8	Park Jin-seob (yellow card) 45'; Guarirapa (yellow card) 89'	Report	Li Lei (yellow card) 48'; Lin Liangming (yellow card) 76'; Abduhamit (yellow card) 90'	Stadium: Huanglong Sports Center Stadium; Attendance: 24,951; Referee: Wang Di; Assistant referees: Guan Changliang; Li Sicheng; Fourth official: Ma Teng

21 April 2026 7	Shenzhen Peng City	0–1	Beijing Guoan	Shenzhen
19:00 UTC+8	Kartsev (yellow card) 41'; Xuan Zhijian (yellow card) 46'	Report	Wang Gang (yellow card) 11'; Cao Yongjing (yellow card) 59'; Zhang Xizhe 89'	Stadium: Shenzhen Sports Center Stadium; Attendance: 16,133; Referee: Shan Dan'ao; Assistant referees: Liu Xing; Yang Xin; Fourth official: Qiu Zhaojun

25 April 2026 8	Beijing Guoan	2–4	Tianjin Jinmen Tiger	Beijing
19:35 UTC+8	Ramos (yellow card) 57'; Zhang Yuning 66'; Lin Liangming 68'; Zhang Xizhe (yellow card) 90+7'	Report	Guilherme 43'; Xadas 45+4'; Wang Qiuming (yellow card) 56'; Quiles 70', 89'	Stadium: Workers' Stadium; Attendance: 55,396; Referee: Shen Yinhao; Assistant referees: Cao Yi; Wang Xihong; Fourth official: Ma Teng

2 May 2026 9	Yunnan Yukun	3–3	Beijing Guoan	Yuxi
20:00 UTC+8	Ioniță 45+1'; Cléber 77'; Maritu 90'	Report	Zhang Yuning 22'; Zhang Xizhe 60' (pen.); Sai Erjini'ao 81'	Stadium: Yuxi Plateau Sports Center Stadium; Attendance: 22,347; Referee: Zhang Lei; Assistant referees: Guo Jingtao; Zhang Zhe; Fourth official: Ma Yunkun

6 May 2026 10	Beijing Guoan	3–0	Dalian Yingbo	Beijing
19:35 UTC+8	Cao Yongjing (red card) 45+3'; Ramos 54'; Huang Shan 58' (o.g.); Lin Liangming 65'; Wang Yu (yellow card) 90+2'	Report	Mao Weijie (yellow card) 6'; Yang Mingrui (yellow card) 13'; Sun Kangbo (yellow card) 47'; Luo Jing (yellow card) 61'; Lü Peng (yellow card) 87'	Stadium: Workers' Stadium; Attendance: 40,423; Referee: Wang Jing; Assistant referees: Ma Ji; Tang Rongdi; Fourth official: Ren Tong

10 May 2026 11	Beijing Guoan	2–2	Shanghai Port	Beijing
19:35 UTC+8	Abreu 49'; Zhang Xizhe 86' (pen.), (yellow card) 90+1'	Report	Leonardo (yellow card) 32', (goal) 62'; Vital 45' (pen.); Li Xinxiang (yellow card) 45+6'; Zhang Yuan (yellow card) 69'; Wang Zhen'ao (yellow card) 77'	Stadium: Workers' Stadium; Attendance: 43,875; Referee: Ma Ning; Assistant referees: Cao Yi; Deng Peng; Fourth official: Xiong Xing

15 May 2026 12	Beijing Guoan	4–2	Qingdao Hainiu	Beijing
20:00 UTC+8	Zhang Yuning 12'; Yue Tze Nam 24'; Zhang Xizhe 37' (pen.); Konté (yellow card) 45+2'; Cao Yongjing 65'	Report	Luo Senwen (yellow card) 51'; Song Wenjie 67'; Yang Cong (yellow card) 75'; Liu Junshuai (yellow card) 87'; Ngan Cheuk Pan 90+4'	Stadium: Workers' Stadium; Attendance: 41,866; Referee: Li Haixin; Assistant referees: Sun Kai; Sun Jin; Fourth official: Mu Yuchen

19 May 2026 13	Qingdao West Coast	1–1	Beijing Guoan	Qingdao
20:00 UTC+8	Rezende (red card) 62'; Davidson 73'; Wang Peng (yellow card) 85'	Report	Konté (yellow card) 38'; Zhang Xizhe (yellow card) 72'; Lin Liangming 78', (yellow card) 81'	Stadium: Qingdao West Coast University City Sports Center; Attendance: 10,633; Referee: Shen Yinhao; Assistant referees: Zhou Fei; Tang Rongdi; Fourth official: Zhang Chao

23 May 2026 14	Beijing Guoan	1–2	Henan	Beijing
19:35 UTC+8	Dawhan 27'; Ramos (yellow card) 89'	Report	Mboula (yellow card) 59'; Abreu 78' (o.g.); Gustavo 87'; Abdurasul (yellow card) 90+6'	Stadium: Workers' Stadium; Attendance: 48,053; Referee: Wang Di; Assistant referees: Liu Zongqi; Zhang Zhe; Fourth official: Gao Peng

30 May 2026 15	Chongqing Tonglianglong	2–3	Beijing Guoan	Chongqing
20:00 UTC+8	Chen Chunxin (yellow card) 45'; Dimata 53', (yellow card) 72'; Lucão 68'; Wu Yongqiang (yellow card) 79'	Report	Abreu 34', 85'; Sai Erjini'ao 82'; Hou Sen (yellow card) 90+9'	Stadium: Longxing Football Stadium; Attendance: 56,246; Referee: Qiu Zhaojun; Assistant referees: Chen Chao; Lü Pin; Fourth official: Cui Yong

27 June 2026 16	Beijing Guoan	1–0	Wuhan Three Towns	Beijing
20:00 UTC+8	Ramos 66'; Zhang Yuning (yellow card) 90+1'	Report	Liu Yiming (yellow card) 45+3'; Xiong Jizheng (yellow card) 64'; Sauer (yellow card) 90+7'	Stadium: Workers' Stadium; Attendance: 40,146; Referee: Jin Jingyuan; Assistant referees: Hu Chengjun; Tang Rongdi; Fourth official: Yan Lifu

4 July 2026 17	Beijing Guoan	2–0	Shandong Taishan	Beijing
19:35 UTC+8	Nkololo (yellow card) 36'; Serginho 74'; Lin Liangming 81'	Report	Zheng Zheng (red card) 23'; Huang Zhengyu (yellow card) 63'	Stadium: Workers' Stadium; Attendance: 56,679; Referee: Shan Dan'ao; Assistant referees: Ma Ji; He Long; Fourth official: Jia Zhiliang

17 July 2026 19	Beijing Guoan	1–1	Liaoning Tieren	Beijing
19:35 UTC+8	Sai Erjini'ao 24', (yellow card) 85'	Report	Zhang Hongfu (yellow card) 45'; Felipe (yellow card) 50'; Kunimoto 56'; Zang Yifeng (yellow card) 73'	Stadium: Workers' Stadium; Attendance: 43,303; Referee: Zhang Lei; Assistant referees: Zhang Chao; Zhang Yang; Fourth official: Ren Tong

26 July 2026 20	Chengdu Rongcheng	2–2	Beijing Guoan	Chengdu
19:35 UTC+8	Li Yang (yellow card) 59'; Felipe (yellow card) 76', (goal) 87'; Sorokin 90+3'	Report	Zhang Yuning 52', 70'; Abreu (yellow card) 76'; Jia Feifan (yellow card) 81'	Stadium: Phoenix Hill Football Stadium; Referee: Ko Hyung-jin (South Korea); Assistant referees: Zhou Fei; Alimjan Abdukadir; Fourth official: Huang Yi

1 August 2026 21	Beijing Guoan	2–1	Zhejiang	Beijing
19:35 UTC+8	Abreu 8' (pen.); Yue Tze Nam (yellow card) 42'; Zhang Xizhe 82'; Jia Feifan (yellow card) 90+5'	Report	Cheng Jin 12'; Tolić (yellow card) 46'	Stadium: Workers' Stadium; Attendance: 45,177; Referee: Liang Songshang; Assistant referees: Xi Fei; Liu Pengfei; Fourth official: Zhang Chao

7 August 2026 22	Beijing Guoan	4–0	Shenzhen Peng City	Beijing
19:35 UTC+8	Zhang Yuning 16'; Tim Chow 26' (o.g.); Dawhan 51'; Ramos (yellow card) 56'; Abreu (yellow card) 68', (goal) 79'	Report	Shen Huanming (yellow card) 41'; Zhang Yufeng (yellow card) 41'; Jiang Zhipeng (yellow card) 75'	Stadium: Workers' Stadium; Attendance: 35,369; Referee: Ren Tong; Assistant referees: Guo Jingtao; Chen Chao; Fourth official: Cui Yong

15 August 2026 23	Tianjin Jinmen Tiger	2–4	Beijing Guoan	Tianjin
19:35 UTC+8	Liu Junxian 70'; Quiles 87'	Report	Abreu 16', 53'; Dawhan 45+2'; Cao Yongjing 49', (yellow card) 88'; Konté (yellow card) 53'	Stadium: Tianjin Olympic Center Stadium; Attendance: 48,929; Referee: Ilgiz Tantashev (Uzbekistan; Assistant referees: Cao Yi; Liu Zongqi; Fourth official: Wan Tao

18 August 2026 18	Shanghai Shenhua	0–3	Beijing Guoan	Shanghai
19:35 UTC+8	Wu Xi (yellow card) 14'; Li Songyi (yellow card) 68'	Report	Ramos 42'; Dawhan (yellow card) 49'; Cao Yongjing 73', (yellow card) 74'; Hou Sen (yellow card) 83'; Li Lei (yellow card) 84'; Zhang Xizhe 86'	Stadium: Shanghai Stadium; Attendance: 38,836; Referee: Gan Shuran; Assistant referees: Ma Ji; Guo Jingtao; Fourth official: Huang Zhiliang
Note: Fixture was initially scheduled for a 19:35 kick-off on 11 July, but was later postponed, due to extreme weather as a result of Typhoon Bavi making landfall.

22 August 2026 24	Beijing Guoan	3–3	Yunnan Yukun	Beijing
20:00 UTC+8	Zhang Yuning (yellow card) 15', (goal) 50'; Dawhan 36'; Sai Erjini'ao 69'	Report	Bunyamin 58'; Maritu 65'; Caio (yellow card) 86'; Ioniță 90+1'	Stadium: Workers' Stadium; Attendance: 46,009; Referee: Shan Dan'ao; Assistant referees: Sun Kai; Wang Yu; Fourth official: Zhu Wenbin

28 August 2026 25	Dalian Yingbo	1–1	Beijing Guoan	Dalian
19:35 UTC+8	De Erjiaduo 48'	Report	Yue Tze Nam (yellow card) 37'; Zhang Yuning 43'; Abduhamit (yellow card) 82'; Ramos (yellow card) 90+2'; Dawhan (red card) 90+8'	Stadium: Dalian Suoyuwan Football Stadium; Attendance: 62,529; Referee: Gan Shuran; Assistant referees: Hu Chengjun; Yang Xin; Fourth official: Ma Teng

5 September 2026 26	Shanghai Port	0–0	Beijing Guoan	Shanghai
19:35 UTC+8		Report	Wang Yu (yellow card) 35'	Stadium: Pudong Football Stadium; Attendance: 25,085; Referee: Mu Yuchen; Assistant referees: Ma Ji; Xu Yuntao; Fourth official: Sun Shengyu

9 October 2026 27	Qingdao Hainiu	0–3	Beijing Guoan	Qingdao
19:35 UTC+8	Gong Ruicong (yellow card) 71'; Li Suda (yellow card) 90+5'	Report	Abreu 5' (pen.), 62'; Sai Erjini'ao 32'; Spajić (yellow card) 40'; Wang Gang (yellow card) 81'	Stadium: Qingdao Youth Football Stadium; Attendance: 15,530; Referee: Shan Dan'ao; Assistant referees: Xi Fei; Su Yang; Fourth official: Cui Yueqiang
Note: The match, initially scheduled to take place on 10 October, was rescheduled to take place on 9 October.

18 October 2026 28	Beijing Guoan	1–0	Qingdao West Coast	Beijing
19:00 UTC+8	Zhang Yuning 78'; Cao Yongjing (yellow card) 90+3'	Report	Meng Jingchao {[yel|48}}	Stadium: Workers' Stadium; Attendance: 40,281; Referee: Zhang Lei; Assistant referees: Tang Rongdi; Wang Zhuo; Fourth official: Yan Lifu

24 October 2026 29	Henan	3–4	Beijing Guoan	Zhengzhou
15:30 UTC+8	Nazário 20', (yellow card) 93'; Pedro Maranhão (yellow card) 26'; Gustavo 34', 42'; Shi Chenglong (yellow card) 78'	Report	Chi Zhongguo (yellow card) 30'; Abdugheni (yellow card) 45'; Zhang Xizhe 65'; Deng Jiefu 69'; Lin Liangming 73'; Zhang Yuning 81'; Spajić (yellow card) 90+1'	Stadium: Hanghai Stadium; Attendance: 19,291; Referee: Choi Hyun-jai (South Korea); Assistant referees: Wu Mingfeng; Lü Pin; Fourth official: Ren Tong

8 November 2026 30	Beijing Guoan	1–0	Chongqing Tonglianglong	Beijing
15:30 UTC+8	Zhang Yuning 80'	Report	Zhang Zhixiong (yellow card) 26'	Stadium: Workers' Stadium; Attendance: 45,257; Referee: Ma Ning; Assistant referees: Zhou Fei; Zhang Cheng; Fourth official: Cui Yong

=== Chinese FA Cup ===
Guoan joined the competition in the fourth round on 19 June.

19 June 2026 Fourth round	Guangdong GZ-Power	1–2	Beijing Guoan	Guangzhou
19:30 UTC+8	Liu Langzhou (yellow card) 64'; Camara 70'		Lin Liangming 24', 49'; Konté (yellow card) 63'; Feng Boxuan (yellow card) 88'; Wang Yu (yellow card) 90+3'	Stadium: Yuexiushan Stadium; Attendance: 8,016; Referee: Huang Yi; Assistant referees: Cao Yi; Su Xiaofei; Fourth official: Yan Lifu

21 July 2026 Fifth round	Dalian Kewei	1–2	Beijing Guoan	Dalian
16:00 UTC+8	Ge Yuxiang 87'		Jia Feifan 45+4'; Zhang Yuning 66'	Stadium: Dalian Football Youth Training Center; Attendance: 3,646; Referee: Sun Shengyu; Assistant referees: Wang Xihong; Shi Qiang; Fourth official: Gu Zhongchao

1 September 2026 Quarter-final	Beijing Guoan	3–1	Lanzhou Longyuan Athletic	Beijing
19:35 UTC+8	Deng Jiefu 26'; Zhang Yuning 86'; Cao Yongjing 90+6'		Lu Jianchen 48'	Stadium: Workers' Stadium; Attendance: 37,409; Referee: Gao Peng; Assistant referees: Wang Wei; Ji Xingwei; Fourth official: Ji Chenguang
Note: The match, originally set to take place at the Lanzhou Olympic Center Stadium in Lanzhou with Lanzhou Longyuan Athletic serving as the home team, was moved to the Workers' Stadium hosted by Beijing Guoan, due to a scheduling conflict regarding Lanzhou's venue between the match and Joker Xue's ongoing The King of Beasts Tour.

20 November 2026 Semi-final	Beijing Guoan	–	Shanghai Port	Beijing
19:35 UTC+8				Stadium: Workers' Stadium

=== Chinese FA Super Cup ===
As the defending Chinese FA Cup champions, Guoan faced the defending Chinese Super League champions Shanghai Port in the Chinese FA Super Cup.

1 March 2026 Final	Shanghai Port	0–2	Beijing Guoan	Nanjing
15:30 UTC+8	Alex Yang (yellow card) 30'; Liu Zhurun (yellow card) 90+3'; Leonardo (yellow card) 90+3'		Abduhamit (yellow card) 20'; Ramos (yellow card) 27'; Dawhan 31'; Zhang Yuning (yellow card) 41'; Yang Liyu (yellow card) 59'; Wang Gang (yellow card) 82'; Cao Yongjing 84'	Stadium: Nanjing Olympic Sports Centre; Attendance: 40,169; Referee: Li Haixin; Assistant referees: Guo Jingtao; Ma Ji; Fourth official: Huang Yi

=== AFC Champions League Elite ===
Guoan joined the competition in the league stage, having qualified for the league stage by winning the 2025 Chinese FA Cup. Two league stage matches are to be played in 2027.

==== League stage ====
Pos	Team	Pld	W	D	L	GF	GA	GD	Pts	Qualification
6	(Malaysia) Johor Darul Ta'zim	4	2	1	1	6	3	+3	7	Advance to round of 16
8	(South Korea) Jeonbuk Hyundai Motors	4	2	1	1	6	5	+1	7	Advance to round of 16
9	(China) Beijing Guoan	4	2	1	1	10	10	0	7	
10	(South Korea) Daejeon Hana Citizen	4	1	1	2	2	4	−2	4	
11	(Vietnam) Công An Hà Nội	4	1	1	2	4	7	−3	4	

Updated to match(es) played on 4 November 2026. Source: AFC
Rules for classification: 1) points; 2) goal difference; 3) number of goals scored; 4) number of matches won; 5) penalty shoot-out if only two teams remain tied and played each other on the final matchday 6) fair play ranking; 7) drawing of lots

===== Results summary =====
Overall								Home						Away					
Pld	W	D	L	GF	GA	GD	Pts	W	D	L	GF	GA	GD	W	D	L	GF	GA	GD
4	2	1	1	10	10	0	7	1	1	0	5	3	+2	1	0	1	5	7	−2

Last updated: 3 November 2026.
Source: AFC

==== Results by round ====
Round	1	2	3	4	5	6
Ground	H	A	H	A	A	H
Result	W	W	D	L		
Position	4	4	5	9		

Updated to match(es) played on 3 November 2026. Source: Competitive matches
A = Away; H = Home; W = Win; D = Draw; L = Loss

==== Matches ====
15 September 2026 1	Beijing Guoan (China)	3–1	(South Korea) Pohang Steelers	Beijing, China
20:15 UTC+8	Akolo 2'; Zhang Xizhe 12'; Wang Gang (yellow card) 43'; Dudziak 46'; Wang Yu (yellow card) 88'	Report	Tranziska 6' (pen.); Kim Ho-jin (yellow card) 40'; Jo Sung-wook (yellow card) 52'; Juninho (yellow card) 67'	Stadium: Workers' Stadium; Attendance: 27,999; Referee: Abdulrahman Al-Jassim (Qatar); Assistant referees: Taleb al-Marri (Qatar); Saud al-Maqaleh (Qatar); Fourth official: Mongkolchai Pechsri (Thailand)

13 October 2026 2	Buriram United (Thailand)	0–1	(China) Beijing Guoan	Buriram, Thailand
19:15 UTC+7	Paulinho (yellow card) 31'	Report	Bai Yang (yellow card) 57'; Ramos (yellow card) 73'; Abreu 79'; Sai Erjini'ao (yellow card) 90+1'	Stadium: Buriram Stadium; Attendance: 24,380; Referee: Alireza Faghani (Australia); Assistant referees: George Lakrindis (Australia); James Lindsay (Australia); Fourth official: Mederbek Taichiev (Kyrgyzstan)

27 October 2026 3	Beijing Guoan (China)	2–2	(South Korea) Jeonbuk Hyundai Motors	Beijing, China
20:15 UTC+8	Dudziak 34'; Wang Gang 52'; Konté (yellow card) 68'	Report	Mota 2', (yellow card) 56'; Kim Young-bin (yellow card) 33'; Lee Yeong-jae 64'; Kang Sang-yoon (yellow card) 75'	Stadium: Workers' Stadium; Attendance: 27,638; Referee: Mooud Bonyadifard (Iran); Assistant referees: Farhad Moravveji (Iran); Bahman Abdollahi Harouni (Iran); Fourth official: Hassan Akrami (Iran)

3 November 2026 4	Port (Thailand)	7–4	(China) Beijing Guoan	Pathum Thani, Thailand
19:15 UTC+7	Soonsup-Bell 17', 19'; Bordin 29', 78', 81'; Teerasak 90+1', 90+5'	Report	Akolo 5'; Dawhan 23', 41'; Shimura 37' (o.g.); Bai Yang (yellow card) 45'; Ramos (red card) 58'	Stadium: True BG Stadium; Attendance: 1,492; Referee: Salman Falahi (Qatar); Assistant referees: Ramzan Saeed Al-Naemi (Qatar); Majid Al-Shammari (Qatar); Fourth official: Mohammed Al-Mazyed (Qatar)

24 November 2026 5	Daejeon Hana Citizen (South Korea)	–	(China) Beijing Guoan	Daejeon, South Korea
19:00 UTC+9				Stadium: Daejeon World Cup Stadium

1 December 2026 6	Beijing Guoan (China)	–	(Thailand) Ratchaburi	Beijing, China
20:15 UTC+8				Stadium: Workers' Stadium

== Statistics ==
=== Appearances and goals ===
As of match played 8 November 2026

No.	Pos.	Nat.	Name	Chinese Super League		Chinese FA Cup		2026–27 AFC Champions League Elite		Chinese FA Super Cup		Total	
No.	Pos.	Nat.	Name	Apps	Goals	Apps	Goals	Apps	Goals	Apps	Goals	Apps	Goals
2	DF	(China)	Wu Shaocong	0	0	0	0	0	0	0	0	0	0
3	DF	(China)	He Yupeng	3(1)	0	0	0	0	0	0	0	3(1)	0
4	DF	(China)	Li Lei	4(12)	0	1	0	0(1)	0	1	0	6(13)	0
5	DF	(Portugal)	Guilherme Ramos	28	3	1	0	3	0	1	0	33	3
6	MF	(China)	Chi Zhongguo	1(11)	0	2	0	0	0	0	0	3(11)	0
7	MF	(China)	Sai Erjini'ao	24(3)	6	0	0	1(3)	0	1	0	26(6)	6
8	MF	(Mali)	Boubacar Konté	26	0	1	0	3	0	0(1)	0	30(1)	0
9	FW	(China)	Zhang Yuning	28(1)	15	2(1)	2	0(2)	0	1	0	31(4)	17
10	MF	(China)	Zhang Xizhe	13(14)	7	2	0	4	1	0(1)	0	19(15)	8
11	FW	(China)	Lin Liangming	15(6)	5	2	2	0(2)	0	0	0	17(8)	7
14	GK	(China)	Lu Tongyun (Note: Player was deregistered for the club's league squad after the summer player registration window.)	0	0	0	0	0	0	0	0	0	0
16	DF	(China)	Feng Boxuan (Note: Player left the club permanently during the season.)	0(2)	0	0(1)	0	0	0	0	0	0(3)	0
17	FW	(China)	Yang Liyu	5(5)	0	2	0	0(2)	0	1	0	8(7)	0
18	MF	(China)	Wang Yu	1(4)	0	1(2)	0	0(1)	0	0	0	2(7)	0
20	FW	(France)	Béni Nkololo	8(1)	0	0	0	4	0	1	0	13(1)	0
21	DF	(Hong Kong)	Yue Tze Nam	16(5)	1	1	0	2(2)	0	1	0	20(7)	1
22	GK	(China)	Han Jiaqi	0(1)	0	0	0	0	0	0	0	0(1)	0
23	MF	(Brazil)	Dawhan	19	4	0	0	4	2	1	1	24	7
24	DF	(China)	Abduhamit Abdugheni	11(6)	0	2	0	0(1)	0	1	0	14(7)	0
25	DF	(Serbia)	Uroš Spajić	5(1)	0	0	0	2	0	0	0	7(1)	0
26	DF	(China)	Bai Yang	26(1)	0	3	0	3	0	0	0	32(1)	0
27	DF	(China)	Wang Gang	20(4)	0	1(1)	0	4	1	0(1)	0	25(6)	1
28	MF	(Tunisia)	Jeremy Dudziak	0	0	0	0	4	2	0	0	4	2
29	FW	(Angola)	Fábio Abreu	22(1)	11	1	0	0(2)	1	1	0	24(3)	12
30	DF	(China)	Fan Shuangjie	0(3)	0	2	0	0	0	0	0	2(3)	0
31	GK	(China)	Liu Shaoziyang	0	0	1	0	0	0	0	0	1	0
32	MF	(China)	Wang Size	0	0	0	0	0	0	0	0	0	0
33	GK	(China)	Nureli Abbas	0	0	0	0	0	0	0	0	0	0
34	GK	(China)	Hou Sen	27	0	2	0	4	0	1	0	34	0
35	DF	(China)	Jiang Wenhao (Note: Player left the club on loan during the season.)	0(1)	0	0	0	0	0	0	0	0(1)	0
36	MF	(China)	Jia Feifan	2(8)	0	2(1)	1	0	0	0(1)	0	4(10)	1
37	FW	(China)	Cao Yongjing	14(13)	3	2(1)	1	0(1)	0	0(1)	1	16(16)	5
38	MF	(China)	Wei Jia'ao	0(1)	0	0	0	0	0	0	0	0(1)	0
39	GK	(China)	Zhang Jianzhi	3	0	0	0	0	0	0	0	3	0
41	MF	(China)	Cheng Xi	0(3)	0	0(2)	0	0	0	0	0	0(5)	0
42	DF	(China)	Lin Hanqi	0	0	0	0	0	0	0	0	0	0
43	MF	(China)	Xia Xiaoyu	0	0	0(1)	0	0	0	0	0	0(1)	0
45	FW	(China)	Ma Mingyang	0	0	0	0	0	0	0	0	0	0
47	DF	(China)	Deng Jiefu	11(11)	1	2(1)	1	1(2)	0	0	0	14(14)	2
50	MF	(China)	Zhang Haoran	0	0	0(1)	0	0	0	0	0	0(1)	0
55	DF	(China)	Luo Zixiang	0	0	0	0	0	0	0	0	0	0
57	MF	(China)	Liu Junze	0	0	0	0	0	0	0	0	0	0
58	FW	(China)	Jiang Zicheng	0(3)	0	0(2)	0	0	0	0	0	0(5)	0
59	MF	(China)	Chen Kangyue	0	0	0	0	0	0	0	0	0	0
77	FW	(Democratic Republic of the Congo)	Chadrac Akolo	0	0	0	0	4	2	0	0	4	2
–	GK	(Paraguay)	Zheng Tuluo (Note: Player was not registered in the club's first team league squad after the winter plyer registration window.)	0	0	0	0	0	0	0	0	0	0

=== Goals ===
As of match played 8 November 2026

Rank	Position	Name	Chinese Super League	Chinese FA Cup	2026–27 AFC Champions League Elite	2026 Chinese FA Super Cup	Total
1	FW	(China) Zhang Yuning	15	2	0	0	17
2	FW	(Angola) Fábio Abreu	11	0	1	0	12
3	MF	(China) Zhang Xizhe	7	0	1	0	8
4	FW	(China) Lin Liangming	5	2	0	0	7
4	MF	(Brazil) Dawhan	4	0	2	1	7
6	MF	(China) Sai Erjini'ao	6	0	0	0	6
7	FW	(China) Cao Yongjing	3	1	0	1	5
8	DF	(Portugal) Guilherme Ramos	3	0	0	0	3
9	DF	(China) Deng Jiefu	1	1	0	0	2
9	MF	(Tunisia) Jeremy Dudziak	0	0	2	0	2
9	FW	(Democratic Republic of the Congo) Chadrac Akolo	0	0	1	0	1
12	DF	(Hong Kong) Yue Tze Nam	1	0	0	0	1
12	MF	(China) Jia Feifan	0	1	0	0	1
12	DF	(China) Wang Gang	0	0	1	0	1
Opposition own goals			2	0	1	0	3
Total			58	7	10	2	77

=== Assists ===
As of match played 8 November 2026

Rank	Position	Name	Chinese Super League	Chinese FA Cup	2026–27 AFC Champions League Elite	2026 Chinese FA Super Cup	Total
1	MF	(China) Sai Erjini'ao	8	0	0	1	9
2	FW	(China) Zhang Yuning	7	0	0	0	7
2	MF	(China) Zhang Xizhe	3	2	2	0	7
4	FW	(Angola) Fábio Abreu	6	0	0	0	6
5	FW	(China) Cao Yongjing	4	1	0	0	5
6	FW	(France) Béni Nkololo	2	0	0	1	3
6	MF	(China) Lin Liangming	1	1	1	0	3
8	DF	(China) Wang Gang	2	0	0	0	2
8	DF	(Hong Kong) Yue Tze Nam	2	0	0	0	2
10	DF	(China) Li Lei	1	0	0	0	1
10	DF	(China) Feng Boxuan	1	0	0	0	1
10	DF	(China) Bai Yang	1	0	0	0	1
10	MF	(Mali) Boubacar Konté	1	0	0	0	1
10	MF	(China) Jia Feifan	1	0	0	0	1
10	MF	(Brazil) Dawhan	1	0	0	0	1
10	FW	(China) Jiang Zicheng	0	1	0	0	1
10	DF	(Serbia) Uroš Spajić	0	0	1	0	1
Total			41	5	4	2	52

=== Clean sheets ===
As of match played 8 November 2026

Rank	Name	Chinese Super League	Chinese FA Cup	2026–27 AFC Champions League Elite	2026 Chinese FA Super Cup	Total
1	(China) Hou Sen	12	0	1	1	14
2	(China) Han Jiaqi	0(1)	0	0	0	0(1)
Total		13	0	1	1	15

Numbers in parentheses represent games where both goalkeepers participated and both kept a clean sheet; the number in parentheses is awarded to the goalkeeper who was substituted on, whilst a full clean sheet is awarded to the goalkeeper who was on the field at the start of play.

=== Disciplinary record ===
N	P	Nat.	Name	Chinese Super League			Chinese FA Cup			2026–27 AFC Champions League Elite			Chinese FA Super Cup			Total			Notes
N	P	Nat.	Name	Yellow card	Second yellow card	Red card	Yellow card	Second yellow card	Red card	Yellow card	Second yellow card	Red card	Yellow card	Second yellow card	Red card	Yellow card	Second yellow card	Red card	Notes
24	DF	(China)	Abduhamit Abdugheni	6									1			7			
5	DF	(Portugal)	Guilherme Ramos	5						1		1	1			7		1	
9	FW	(China)	Zhang Yuning	2									1			3			
17	FW	(China)	Yang Liyu										1			1			
27	DF	(China)	Wang Gang	2						1			1			4			
20	FW	(France)	Béni Nkololo	3												3			
29	FW	(Angola)	Fábio Abreu	3												3			
8	MF	(Mali)	Boubacar Konté	4			1			1						6			
4	DF	(China)	Li Lei	2												2			
11	FW	(China)	Lin Liangming	2												2			
37	FW	(China)	Cao Yongjing	4		1										4		1	
10	MF	(China)	Zhang Xizhe	3												3			
18	MF	(China)	Wang Yu	2			1			1						4			
34	GK	(China)	Hou Sen	2												2			
16	DF	(China)	Feng Boxuan				1									1			
7	MF	(China)	Sai Erjini'ao	1						1						2			
36	MF	(China)	Jia Feifan	2												2			
21	DF	(Hong Kong)	Yue Tze Nam	2												2			
23	MF	(Brazil)	Dawhan	1												1			
25	DF	(Serbia)	Uroš Spajić	2												2			
26	DF	(China)	Bai Yang							2						2			
6	MF	(China)	Chi Zhongguo	1						1						2			

Last updated: 8 November 2026
Ordered by (red card) , (second yellow card) and (yellow card)
(yellow card) = Number of bookings; (second yellow card) = Number of sending offs after a second yellow card; (red card) = Number of sending offs by a direct red card.

== Awards ==
=== Matchday awards ===
==== Chinese Super League Player of the Round ====
Matchday	Pos.	Player	Result	Ref.
1	FW	(Angola) Fábio Abreu	Nominated	
7	MF	(China) Zhang Xizhe	Nominated	
9	MF	(China) Zhang Xizhe	Nominated	
10	DF	(Portugal) Guilherme Ramos	Nominated	
11	FW	(China) Zhang Yuning	Nominated	
12	FW	(China) Zhang Yuning	Nominated	
15	FW	(Angola) Fábio Abreu	Nominated	
16	DF	(Portugal) Guilherme Ramos	Nominated	
17	FW	(China) Lin Liangming	Nominated	
17	MF	(China) Cao Yongjing	Nominated	
19	MF	(China) Sai Erjini'ao	Nominated	
20	FW	(China) Zhang Yuning	Won	
21	MF	(China) Zhang Xizhe	Nominated	
22	FW	(China) Zhang Yuning	Nominated	
23	FW	(Angola) Fábio Abreu	Nominated	
18	GK	(China) Hou Sen	Nominated	
18	FW	(China) Zhang Yuning	Nominated	
24	MF	(Brazil) Dawhan	Nominated	
26	GK	(China) Hou Sen	Nominated	
27	FW	(Angola) Fábio Abreu	Nominated	
28	FW	(China) Zhang Yuning	Nominated	

=== Monthly awards ===
==== Chinese Super League Player of the Month nominations ====
Month	Pos.	Player	Pld	G	A	CS	S	Ref.
March	FW	(China) Zhang Yuning	3	3	0	–	–	
May	MF	(China) Sai Erjini'ao	7	2	3	–	–	
May	MF	(China) Zhang Xizhe	7	3	2	–	–	

==== Chinese Super League Team of the Month ====
Month	Pos.	Player	Pld	G	A	CS	S	Ref.
March	FW	(China) Zhang Yuning	3	3	0	–	–	

=== Chinese FA Super Cup Player of the Match ===
Player	Ref.
(Brazil) Dawhan	
