= Yue Tze Nam =

Hong Kong footballer (born 1998)

Yue Tze Nam 茹子楠
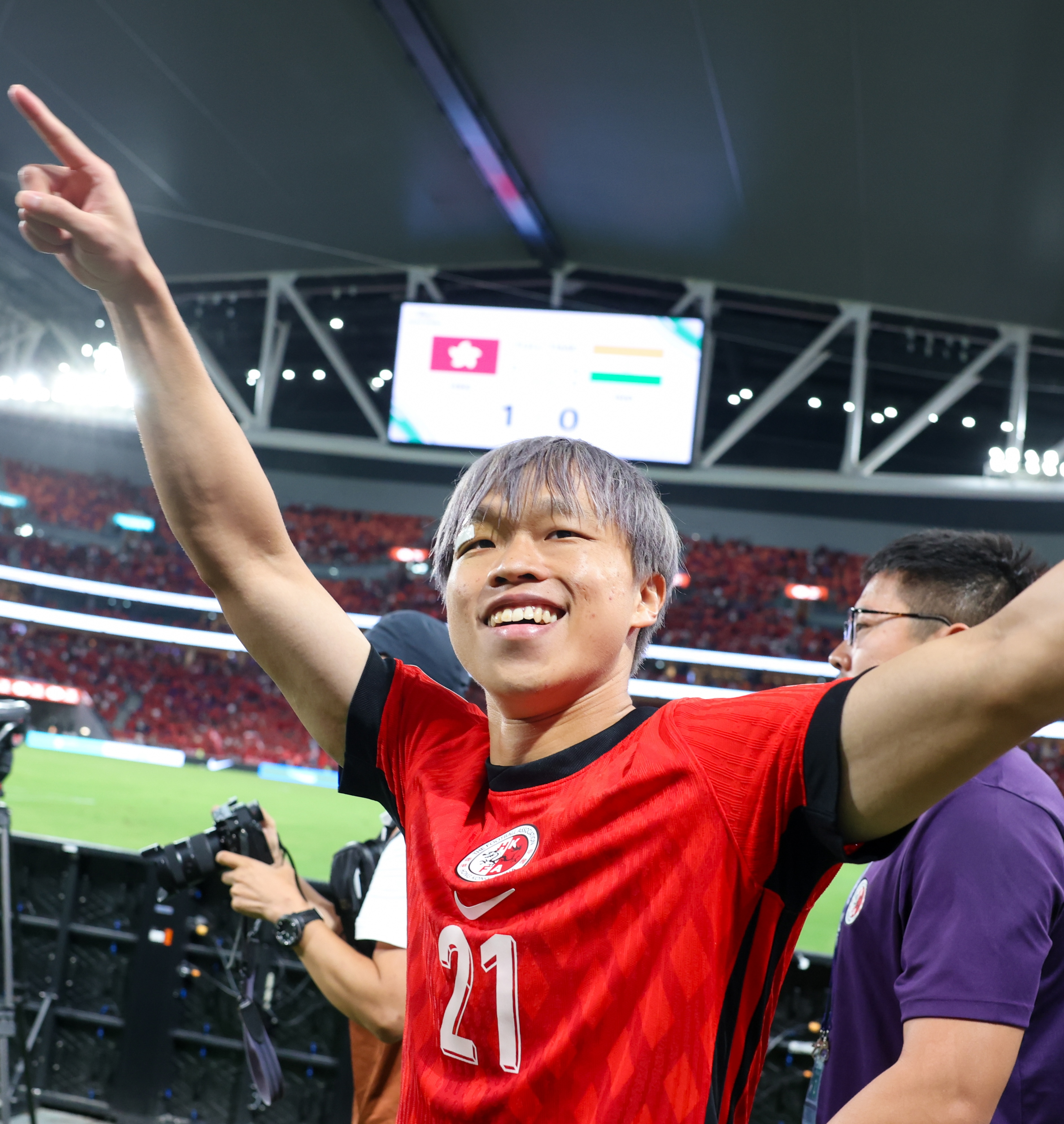
- Yue in 2025

Personal information
- Date of birth: 12 May 1998 (age 28)
- Place of birth: Causeway Bay, Hong Kong
- Height: 1.70 m (5 ft 7 in)
- Positions: Right back; attacking midfielder

Team information
- Current team: Beijing Guoan
- Number: 21

Youth career
- 2009–2015: Eastern

Senior career*
Years	Team	Apps	(Gls)
2017–2019	Eastern	4	(0)
2019	Cova Piedade	0	(0)
2019–2022	Eastern	8	(0)
2020–2021	→ Resources Capital (loan)	15	(1)
2022–2025	Meizhou Hakka	92	(7)
2026–	Beijing Guoan	21	(1)

International career^{‡}
2019	Hong Kong U-23	2	(1)
2018–	Hong Kong	43	(0)
Medal record
Men's football
Representing Hong Kong
FIFA ASEAN Challenge Cup
Winner	2026 Hong Kong
- * Club domestic league appearances and goals as of 8 November 2026 ‡ National team caps and goals as of 3 October 2026

Yue Tze Nam (Chinese: 茹子楠; born 12 May 1998) is a Hong Kong professional footballer who currently plays as a right back for China Super League club Beijing Guoan and the Hong Kong national team.

== Early life ==
Yue was introduced to football by his father and began playing at the age of four at King George V Memorial Park near his home in Sai Ying Pun. At the age of six, he joined the Orca Football Academy for formal training. Yue later moved to the youth team Little Nam Kwok co-founded by his father, where he regularly participated in training camps and youth tournaments across the region.

Yue became a member of the Hong Kong national youth football teams in 2011, playing for various age groups and occasionally serving as captain. However, due to following misguided fitness advice, he developed anorexia nervosa, leading him to miss Hong Kong's qualification for the AFC U-16 Championship finals in 2014.

Yue later moved to the United Kingdom to study at Oswestry School, representing the school team in competitive matches. During his three years in the UK, Yue also played for local amateur club Oswestry, earning the Player of the Match award on several occasions.

== Club career ==
=== Eastern ===
In the 2017–18 season, following the revamped Sapling Cup rules requiring each team to field at least two U22 players per match, Eastern's then-vice chairman Lee Kin Wo invited the eligible Yue to return to his parent club and compete in the competition while still completing his studies in the UK. Yue shuttled between England and Hong Kong to balance academics and professional football. On 29 October 2017, he made his professional debut starting in a Sapling Cup group stage match against Tai Po, playing the full 90 minutes in a 2–5 defeat.

After graduating from secondary school, Yue returned to Hong Kong full-time for the 2018–19 season. Playing primarily as a midfielder, he struggled for minutes amid competition from foreign imports and senior local players. In late 2018, Yue started against Pegasus but became a substitute after 43 minutes due to his poor performance. In February 2019, recommended by Eastern's youth director Wong Chun Yue, Yue trialled with Liga Portugal 2 club Cova Piedade, a partner of Eastern. He planned a two-year stint in Portugal but returned to Hong Kong that summer after failing to adapt to life abroad and integrate into the squad.

Wanting regular playing time, Yue moved to newly-promoted Resources Capital on loan fr the 2020–21 season. Apart from the match against Eastern (due to loan terms), he started nearly every league game, scored his first professional league goal in the final fixture, and provided six assists across the campaign.

=== Moving to China ===
In August 2022, Yue moved to China, signing for Meizhou Hakka on a three-and-a-half-year contract.

On 14 January 2026, Yue joined fellow Chinese Super League club Beijing Guoan. On 15 May 2026, he scored his first goal for the club in a 4–2 league victory at home against Qingdao Hainiu, with a left-footed volley from outside the box on the 23rd minute.

== International career ==
In October 2018, Yue was called up by newly appointed Hong Kong head coach Gary White for friendly matches against Thailand and Indonesia. White praised his energetic personality and versatile style.

On 16 October, Yue made his senior debut as a 90th minute substitute in a 1–1 away draw against Indonesia. He travelled to Taiwan for the 2019 EAFF Championship second round qualification in November, but did not made any appearance.

On 30 May 2025, Yue played 45 minutes in an unofficial friendly match in which Hong Kong lost 1–3 against Manchester United. On 10 June 2025, in Hong Kong's first match at the new Kai Tak Sports Park, he started in a 1–0 Asian Cup qualifier victory against India.

On 5 June 2026, Yue captained the Hong Kong representative team for the first time in his career, leading the team to a 2–0 win at home against Mongolia.

== Career statistics ==
=== Club ===
As of 14 January 2026

Club	Season	League			Cup		League Cup		Continental		Other		Total	
Club	Season	Division	Apps	Goals	Apps	Goals	Apps	Goals	Apps	Goals	Apps	Goals	Apps	Goals
Eastern	2017–18	Hong Kong Premier League	1	0	0	0	0	0	0	0	3 (Note: Appearances in Hong Kong Sapling Cup)	0	4	0
Eastern	2018–19	Hong Kong Premier League	3	0	0	0	0	0	–		2	0	5	0
Eastern	Total		4	0	0	0	0	0	0	0	5	0	9	0
Cova Piedade	2019–20	LigaPro	0	0	0	0	0	0	–		–		0	0
Eastern	2019–20	Hong Kong Premier League	4	0	0	0	1 (Note: Appearances in Hong Kong Senior Challenge Shield)	0	–		8	0	13	0
Eastern	2021–22	Hong Kong Premier League	4	0	2	0	–		0	0	7	1	13	1
Eastern	Total		8	0	2	0	1	0	0	0	15	1	26	1
Resources Capital (loan)	2020–21	Hong Kong Premier League	15	1	–		–		–		3	0	18	1
Meizhou Hakka	2022	Chinese Super League	17	2	1	0	–		–		–		18	2
Meizhou Hakka	2023	Chinese Super League	27	1	0	0	–		–		–		27	1
Meizhou Hakka	2024	Chinese Super League	29	1	0	0	–		–		–		29	1
Meizhou Hakka	2025	Chinese Super League	19	3	0	0	–		–		–		19	3
Meizhou Hakka	Total		92	7	1	0	0	0	0	0	0	0	93	7
Beijing Guoan	2026	Chinese Super League	0	0	0	0	–		–		0	0	0	0
Career total			119	8	3	0	1	0	0	0	23	1	146	9

=== International ===
As of 3 October 2026

National team	Year	Apps	Goals
Hong Kong	2018	1	0
Hong Kong	2019	1	0
Hong Kong	2020	0	0
Hong Kong	2021	0	0
Hong Kong	2022	6	0
Hong Kong	2023	8	0
Hong Kong	2024	12	0
Hong Kong	2025	11	0
Hong Kong	2026	4	0
Total		43	0

#	Date	Venue	Opponent	Result	Competition
2018
1	16 October 2018	Wibawa Mukti Stadium, Indonesia	Indonesia	1–1	Friendly
2019
2	11 June 2019	Mong Kok Stadium, Hong Kong	Chinese Taipei	0–2	Friendly
2022
3	1 June 2022	National Stadium Bukit Jalil, Kuala Lumpur, Malaysia	Malaysia	0–2	Friendly
4	8 June 2022	Salt Lake Stadium, Kolkata, India	Afghanistan	2–1	2023 AFC Asian Cup qualification – third round
5	11 June 2022	Salt Lake Stadium, Kolkata, India	Cambodia	3–0	2023 AFC Asian Cup qualification – third round
6	19 July 2022	Kashima Stadium, Kashima, Japan	Japan	0–6	2022 EAFF E-1 Football Championship
7	24 July 2022	Toyota Stadium, Toyota, Japan	South Korea	0–3	2022 EAFF E-1 Football Championship
8	27 July 2022	Toyota Stadium, Toyota, Japan	China	0–1	2022 EAFF E-1 Football Championship
2023
9	23 March 2023	Mong Kok Stadium, Mong Kok, Hong Kong	Singapore	1–1	Friendly
10	28 March 2023	Sultan Ibrahim Stadium, Johor, Malaysia	Malaysia	0–2	Friendly
11	19 June 2023	Hong Kong Stadium, So Kon Po, Hong Kong	Thailand	0–1	Friendly
12	11 September 2023	Hong Kong Stadium, So Kon Po, Hong Kong	Brunei	10–0	Friendly
13	12 October 2023	Hong Kong Stadium, So Kon Po, Hong Kong	Bhutan	4–0	2026 FIFA World Cup qualification – AFC first round
14	17 October 2023	Changlimithang Stadium, Thimphu, Bhutan	Bhutan	0–2	2026 FIFA World Cup qualification – AFC first round
15	16 November 2023	Azadi Stadium, Tehran, Iran	Iran	0–4	2026 FIFA World Cup qualification – AFC second round
16	21 November 2023	Hong Kong Stadium, So Kon Po, Hong Kong	Turkmenistan	2–2	2026 FIFA World Cup qualification – AFC second round
2024
17	1 January 2024	Baniyas Stadium, Abu Dhabi, United Arab Emirates	China	2–1	Friendly
18	14 January 2024	Khalifa International Stadium, Al Rayyan, Qatar	United Arab Emirates	1–3	2023 AFC Asian Cup
19	19 January 2024	Khalifa International Stadium, Al Rayyan, Qatar	Iran	0–1	2023 AFC Asian Cup
20	23 January 2024	Abdullah bin Khalifa Stadium, Doha, Qatar	Palestine	0–3	2023 AFC Asian Cup
21	21 March 2024	Mong Kok Stadium, Mong Kok, Hong Kong	Uzbekistan	0–2	2026 FIFA World Cup qualification – AFC second round
22	26 March 2024	Milliy Stadium, Tashkent, Uzbekistan	Uzbekistan	0–3	2026 FIFA World Cup qualification – AFC second round
23	6 June 2024	Hong Kong Stadium, So Kon Po, Hong Kong	Iran	2–4	2026 FIFA World Cup qualification – AFC second round
24	11 June 2024	Ashgabat Stadium, Ashgabat, Turkmenistan	Turkmenistan	0–0	2026 FIFA World Cup qualification – AFC second round

== Honours ==
=== Club ===
Eastern

- Hong Kong Senior Shield: 2019–20
- Hong Kong FA Cup: 2019–20

Beijing Guoan

- Chinese FA Super Cup: 2026

=== International ===
Hong Kong

- Guangdong-Hong Kong Cup: 2019
- FIFA ASEAN Challenge Cup: 2026
