= Abduhamit Abdugheni =

Chinese footballer (born 1998)

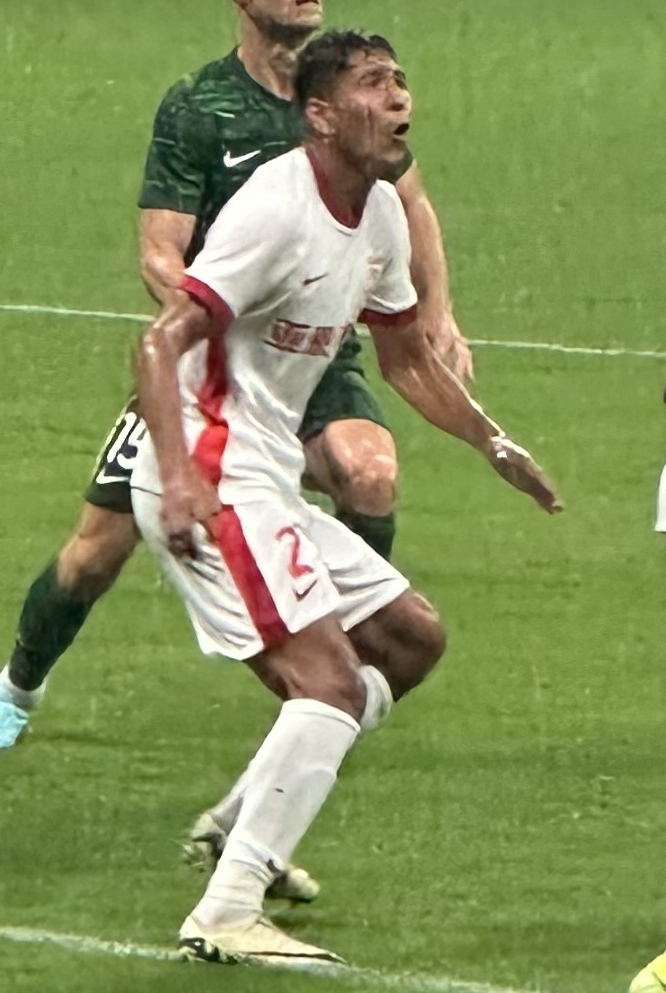
- Abduhamit in June 2025

Personal information
- Full name: Abduhamit Abdugheni
- Date of birth: 10 March 1998 (age 28)
- Place of birth: Yining, Xinjiang, China
- Height: 1.84 m (6 ft 0 in)
- Positions: Right-back; right winger

Team information
- Current team: Beijing Guoan
- Number: 24

Youth career
- 2010–2016: Xinjiang Youth

Senior career*
Years	Team	Apps	(Gls)
2017	Xinjiang Tianshan Leopard	19	(4)
2018–2020	Jiangsu Suning	39	(0)
2021	Cangzhou Mighty Lions	13	(0)
2022	Chengdu Rongcheng	15	(0)
2023–2025	Changchun Yatai	70	(0)
2026–	Beijing Guoan	17	(0)

International career^{‡}
2013	China U17	1	(0)
2018–2020	China U23	5	(0)
- * Club domestic league appearances and goals as of 19 November 2026 ‡ National team caps and goals as of 19 November 2018

Abduhamit Abdugheni (Chinese: 阿不都海米提·阿不都格尼; Uyghur: ئابدۇخەمىت ئابدۇغەنى; born 10 March 1998) is a Chinese professional footballer who plays as a right-back for Chinese Super League club Beijing Guoan.

== Club career ==
Abduhamit joined China League One club Xinjiang Tianshan Leopard in 2017. He made his senior debut on 8 April 2017, playing the whole match in a 2–1 away loss against Shanghai Shenxin On 16 April 2017, he provided a crucial assist to Wu Peng who scored the winner in his second appearance with a 1–0 home win over Dalian Yifang. He scored his first goalin his third senior match on 23 April 2017, in a 1–0 home win against Dalian Transcendence. Abduhamit scored four goals in 19 appearances for Xinjiang in the 2017 season.

On 7 January 2018, Abduhamit transferred to Chinese Super League side Jiangsu Suning. On 4 March 2018, he made his debut for the club in a 3–1 away victory against Guizhou Hengfeng, coming on as a substitute for Zhang Lingfeng in the 71st minute. He would even be part of the squad that won the 2020 Chinese Super League title. His time at the club would end when the clubs owners were in financial difficulties and dissolved the team.

On 24 March 2021, Abduhamit was free to join top-tier club Cangzhou Mighty Lions for the start of the 2021 Chinese Super League season. He would go on to make his debut in a league game on 24 April 2021 against Qingdao in a 2–1 defeat. After one season with the club he would join newly promoted top-tier club Chengdu Rongcheng on 26 April 2022. He would go on to make his debut in a league game on 4 June 2022 against Shenzhen FC in a 2–0 defeat.

On 7 April 2023, Abduhamit joined fellow Chinese Super League club Changchun Yatai on a free transfer. On 26 December 2025, Abduhamit announced his departure after the 2025 season as Changchun Yatai were relegated to the 2026 China League One.

=== Beijing Guoan ===
On 14 January 2026, Abduhamit joined Chinese Super League side Beijing Guoan.

== Career statistics ==
As of 14 January 2026

Appearances and goals by club, season and competition
Club	Season	League			National Cup		Continental		Other (Note: Includes Chinese FA Super Cup)		Total	
Club	Season	Division	Apps	Goals	Apps	Goals	Apps	Goals	Apps	Goals	Apps	Goals
Xinjiang Tianshan Leopard	2017	China League One	19	4	0	0	–		–		19	4
Jiangsu Suning	2018	Chinese Super League	5	0	0	0	–		–		5	0
Jiangsu Suning	2019	Chinese Super League	19	0	1	0	–		–		20	0
Jiangsu Suning	2020	Chinese Super League	15	0	4	0	–		–		19	0
Jiangsu Suning	Total'		39	0	5	0	0	0	0	0	44	0
Cangzhou Mighty Lions	2021	Chinese Super League	13	0	1	0	–		–		14	0
Chengdu Rongcheng	2022	Chinese Super League	15	0	1	0	–		–		16	0
Changchun Yatai	2023	Chinese Super League	27	0	1	0	–		–		28	0
Changchun Yatai	2024	Chinese Super League	19	0	1	0	–		–		20	0
Changchun Yatai	2025	Chinese Super League	24	0	1	0	–		–		25	0
Changchun Yatai	Total'		70	0	3	0	0	0	0	0	73	0
Beijing Guoan	2026	Chinese Super League	17	0	2	0	1	0	1	0	21	0
Career total			173	4	12	0	1	0	1	0	187	4

== Honours ==
Jiangsu Suning

- Chinese Super League: 2020

Beijing Guoan

- Chinese FA Super Cup: 2026
