= Wei Jia'ao =

Chinese footballer (born 2005)

Personal information
- Full name: Wei Jia'ao
- Date of birth: 2 October 2005 (age 21)
- Place of birth: Hunyuan County, Shanxi, China
- Height: 1.75 m (5 ft 9 in)
- Position: Midfielder

Team information
- Current team: Beijing Guoan
- Number: 38

Youth career
- 2018–2025: Beijing Guoan

Senior career*
Years	Team	Apps	(Gls)
2025–	Beijing Guoan	1	(0)
2026–	→ BIT (loan)	4	(0)
- * Club domestic league appearances and goals as of 29 July 2026

Wei Jia'ao (Chinese: 魏家傲; pinyin: Wèi Jiā'ào; born 2 October 2005) is a Chinese professional footballer who plays as a midfielder for Chinese Super League club Beijing Guoan.

== Early life ==
In March 2015, Wei Jia'ao joined an event hosted in Wuhan by Premier League club Chelsea, amassing 200 children aged 8 to 15 from all over China to train under four Chelsea youth coaches. Wei was picked as the first young player to be invited to England.

In his first year in junior high school at The Experimental School Affiliated to Niulanshan First Secondary School, he joined the youth academy of Chinese Super League club Beijing Guoan.

== Club career ==
=== Beijing Guoan ===
During the 2025 summer player registration window, Wei was promoted to the Beijing Guoan first-team and was given the number 63. On 18 September 2025, he made his senior debut for Guoan in a 2–2 home draw with Vietnamese side Cong An Hanoi in the 2025–26 AFC Champions League Two.

In the 2026 season, Wei wore the number 38 shirt. On 8 March, he made his league debut in a 2–0 away win over Wuhan Three Towns, coming on as a 82nd-minute substitute for Béni Nkololo.

==== BIT loan ====
On 3 July 2026, Wei was loaned out to China League Two side BIT until the end of the season.

== Career statistics ==
=== Club ===
As of 9 March 2026

Club	Season	League			Cup		Continental		Other		Total	
Club	Season	Division	Apps	Goals	Apps	Goals	Apps	Goals	Apps	Goals	Apps	Goals
Beijing Guoan	2025	Chinese Super League	0	0	0	0	1 (Note: Appearances in AFC Champions League Two)	0	–		1	0
Beijing Guoan	2026	Chinese Super League	1	0	0	0	0 (Note: Appearances in AFC Champions League Elite)	0	0 (Note: Appearances in Chinese FA Super Cup)	0	1	0
Beijing Guoan	Total		1	0	0	0	1	0	0	0	2	0
Career total			1	0	0	0	1	0	0	0	2	0

== Honours ==
Beijing Guoan

- Chinese FA Super Cup: 2026
