= Jiang Zicheng =

Chinese footballer (born 2007)

Personal information
- Full name: Jiang Zicheng
- Date of birth: 11 September 2007 (age 19)
- Place of birth: Beijing, China
- Height: 1.74 m (5 ft 9 in)
- Position: Winger

Team information
- Current team: Beijing Guoan
- Number: 58

Youth career
- –2026: Beijing Guoan

Senior career*
Years	Team	Apps	(Gls)
2026–	Beijing Guoan	5	(0)
- * Club domestic league appearances and goals as of 19 November 2026

Jiang Zicheng (simplified Chinese: 蒋子承; traditional Chinese: 蔣子承; pinyin: Jiǎng Zǐchéng; born 11 September 2007) is a Chinese footballer who plays as a winger for Chinese Super League club Beijing Guoan.

== Early and personal life ==
Born on 11 September 2007 in Beijing, Jiang Zicheng is the son of Beijing Guoan's long-time first-team assistant team leader and translator Jiang Xiaojun. Jiang has been a Beijing Guoan supporter growing up, having attended matches at the old Workers' Stadium. Jiang claimed that it had been a childhood dream to play as a Beijing Guoan player at the Workers' Stadium. He had been playing in the Beijing Guoan youth academy from a young age.

After two years of primary school in Beijing, Jiang briefly stayed in Huesca and Barcelona in Spain to complete primary school. After returning to Beijing, he was educated at Beijing No. 2 Middle School-Chaoyang and RCF Experimental School. In 2026, he applied for post-secondary education at Hong Kong University of Science and Technology and Hong Kong Polytechnic University.

== Career ==
In the 2026 summer player registration window, Jiang was promoted to the first-team of Chinese Super League side Beijing Guoan. On 21 July 2026, he made his debut for Beijing Guoan, coming on as a late substitute for Fan Shuangjie in a 2–1 away victory over Dalian Kewei in the Chinese FA Cup. Jiang made his Chinese Super League and home debut two weeks later on 7 August, replacing Bai Yang in a 4–0 win against Shenzhen Peng City. At the time of his league debut, his father worked as the assistant team leader for Guoan and was present at the match. In one of his only touches during the game, he dribbled past a Shenzhen Peng City defender.

== Career statistics ==
=== Club ===
As of 7 August 2026

Club	Season	League			Cup		Continental		Other		Total	
Club	Season	Division	Apps	Goals	Apps	Goals	Apps	Goals	Apps	Goals	Apps	Goals
Beijing Guoan	2026	Chinese Super League	1	0	1	0	0 (Note: Appearances in AFC Champions League Elite)	0	0 (Note: Appearances in Chinese FA Super Cup)	0	2	0
Career total			1	0	1	0	0	0	0	0	2	0
