= Deng Jiefu =

Chinese footballer (born 2007)

Personal information
- Full name: Deng Jiefu
- Date of birth: 28 June 2007 (age 19)
- Place of birth: Guiyang, Guizhou, China
- Height: 1.83 m (6 ft 0 in)
- Position: Left-back

Team information
- Current team: Beijing Guoan
- Number: 47

Youth career
- Guiyang Hongxing
- –2024: Dalian Pro
- 2024–2025: Dalian FA
- 2025: Dalian Yingbo

Senior career*
Years	Team	Apps	(Gls)
2026–	Beijing Guoan	27	(2)

International career
2026–	China U19	3	(0)
- * Club domestic league appearances and goals as of 19 November 2026

Deng Jiefu (simplified Chinese: 邓捷夫; traditional Chinese: 鄧捷夫; pinyin: Dèng Jiéfū; born 28 June 2007) is a Chinese professional footballer who plays as a left-back for Chinese Super League club Beijing Guoan.

== Early career ==
Deng Jiefu was born on 28 June 2007 in Guiyang, Guizhou, and was educated at Yunyan District's Guiyang No. 2 Experimental Primary School, which was a feeder school to the Beijing Renhe youth academy. He started his youth career at local amateur club Guiyang Hongxing FC before joining professional side Dalian Pro, where he stayed until the club's dissolution. After a short spell at the Dalian FA, he joined the youth ranks of Dalian Yingbo.

In October 2025, Deng won a gold medal at the under-18 men's football event of the 2025 National Games of China with the Liaoning U18, edging past Shandong U18 in the final on penalties.

== Club career ==
=== Beijing Guoan ===
On 14 January 2026, Deng signed with Chinese Super League side Beijing Guoan, choosing to wear the number 47. On 8 March 2026, he made his senior debut for Beijing Guoan in a 2–0 league victory at Wuhan Three Towns.

== International career ==
In 2022, Deng was selected for a Chinese Football Association elites scouting camp for the 2007 to the 2009 age levels. Two years later in late 2024, he was called up to participate in a China training camp for the 2007 age level.

In 2025, he was called up by the China U18 to compete in the 33rd China-Japan-Korea Junior Sports Exchange Meet in Baotou, Inner Mongolia.

== Career statistics ==
As of 14 January 2026

Appearances and goals by club, season, and competition
Club	Season	League			Cup		Continental		Other		Total	
Club	Season	Division	Apps	Goals	Apps	Goals	Apps	Goals	Apps	Goals	Apps	Goals
Beijing Guoan	2026	Chinese Super League	1	0	0	0	0 (Note: Appearances in AFC Champions League Elite)	0	0 (Note: Appearances in Chinese FA Super Cup)	0	1	0
Career total			1	0	0	0	0	0	0	0	1	0

== Honours ==
=== Club ===
Beijing Guoan

- Chinese FA Super Cup: 2026

=== National Games of China ===
Liaoning U18

- Football at the National Games of China: 2025
