= Wang Yu (footballer) =

Chinese footballer

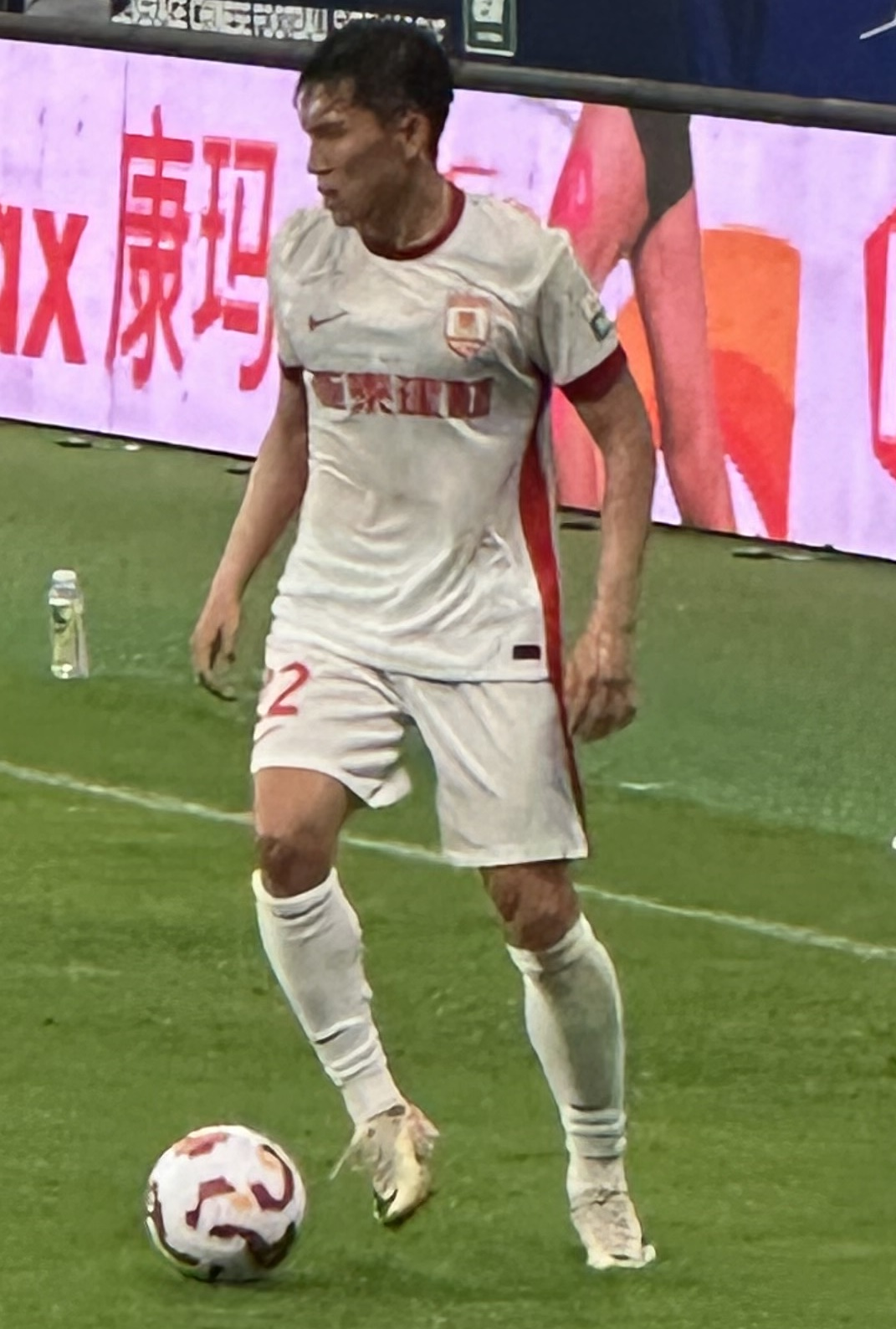
- Wang Yu in June 2025

Personal information
- Date of birth: 28 April 2002 (age 24)
- Place of birth: Dalian, Liaoning, China
- Height: 1.80 m (5 ft 11 in)
- Position: Midfielder

Team information
- Current team: Beijing Guoan
- Number: 18

Youth career
- 2015–2018: Atlético Madrid
- 2019–2020: Dalian Pro

Senior career*
Years	Team	Apps	(Gls)
2021–2023	Dalian Pro	21	(0)
2024–2025	Changchun Yatai	33	(0)
2026–	Beijing Guoan	5	(0)
- * Club domestic league appearances and goals as of 19 November 2026

Wang Yu (Chinese: 王禹; pinyin: Wáng Yǔ; born 28 April 2002) is a Chinese professional footballer who plays as a midfielder for Chinese Super League club Beijing Guoan.

== Club career ==
Wang Yu joined Beijing Wanda and went to Atlético Madrid for youth training in 2015. On his return to China he would join Wanda Group owned Dalian Yifang's youth team in 2019. He would go on to represent both their U-17 and U-19 youth team. In July 2021, Wang was promoted to the first team squad (now known as Dalian Pro), and he would go on to make his debut on 31 July 2021 in a league game against Beijing Guoan that ended in a 1-0 defeat.

On 7 February 2024, Wang joined Chinese Super League club Changchun Yatai, following the dissolution of Dalian Pro.

On 6 February 2026, Wang Yu signed for Chinese Super League side Beijing Guoan, choosing to wear the number 18 shirt.

== Career statistics ==
As of 30 September 2023.

Club	Season	League			Cup		Continental		Other		Total	
Club	Season	Division	Apps	Goals	Apps	Goals	Apps	Goals	Apps	Goals	Apps	Goals
Dalian Pro	2021	Chinese Super League	2	0	1	0	–		0 (Note: Appearance(s) in Promotion/Relegation Play-offs)	0	3	0
Dalian Pro	2022	Chinese Super League	1	0	0	0	–		–		1	0
Dalian Pro	2023	Chinese Super League	18	0	3	0	–		–		21	0
Dalian Pro	Total		21	0	4	0	0	0	0	0	25	0
Career total			21	0	4	0	0	0	0	0	25	0

== Honours ==
Beijing Guoan

- Chinese FA Super Cup: 2026
