= Dawhan =

Brazilian footballer (born 1996)

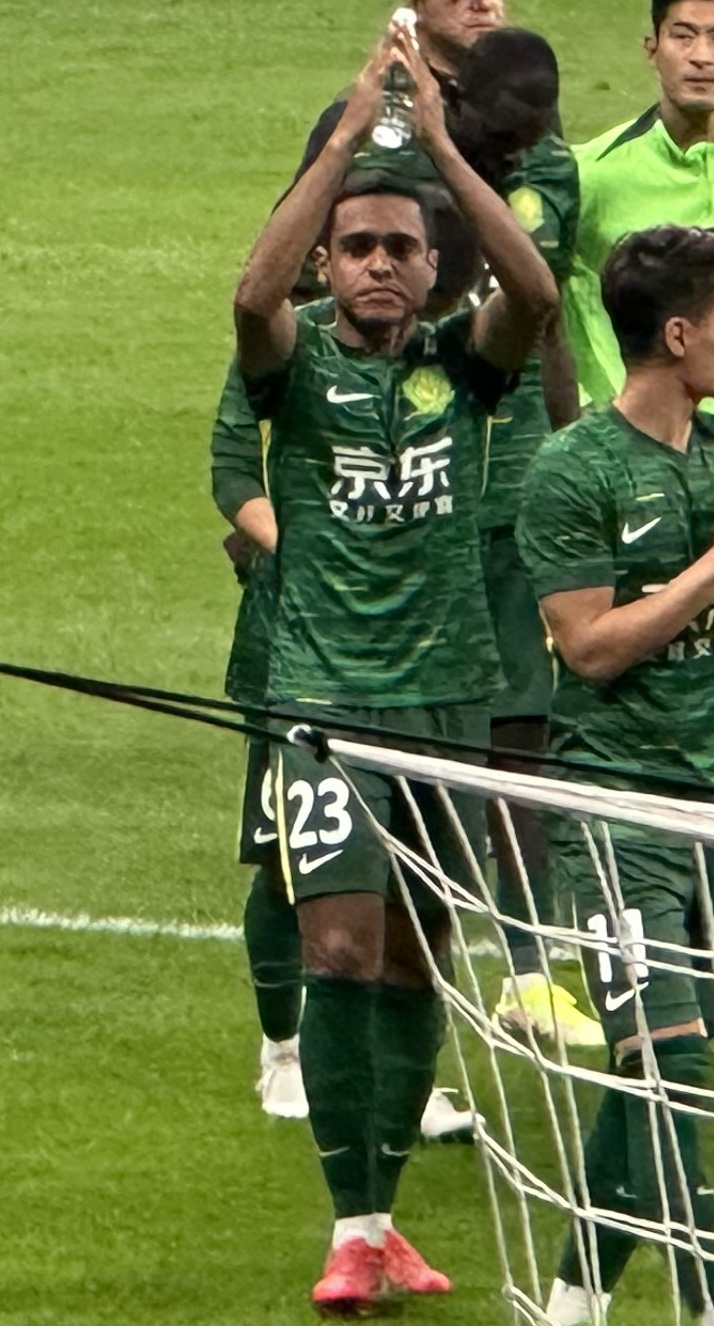
- Dawhan in May 2025

Personal information
- Full name: Dawhan Fran Urano da Purificação Oliveira
- Date of birth: 3 June 1996 (age 30)
- Place of birth: Aracaju, Brazil
- Height: 1.77 m (5 ft 10 in)
- Positions: Defensive midfielder; centre-back

Team information
- Current team: Beijing Guoan
- Number: 23

Youth career
- 2012–2013: Vitória
- 2013: Internacional
- 2014–2016: Corinthians

Senior career*
| Years | Team | Apps | (Gls) |
| 2015–2016 | Corinthians | 0 | (0) |
| 2015 | → Flamengo-SP (loan) | 17 | (0) |
| 2017–2023 | Santa Rita | 0 | (0) |
| 2017–2019 | → CSA (loan) | 103 | (4) |
| 2020–2021 | → Ponte Preta (loan) | 70 | (6) |
| 2021 | → Juventude (loan) | 23 | (3) |
| 2022 | → Gamba Osaka (loan) | 27 | (3) |
| 2023–2024 | Gamba Osaka | 70 | (9) |
| 2025– | Beijing Guoan | 45 | (5) |
- * Club domestic league appearances and goals as of 28 August 2026

Dawhan Fran Urano da Purificação Oliveira (born 3 June 1996), simply known as Dawhan, is a Brazilian footballer who plays as a defensive midfielder or a centre-back for Chinese Super League club Beijing Guoan.

== Club career ==
Born in Aracaju, Sergipe, Dawhan represented Vitória, Internacional and Corinthians as a youth, before making his senior debut while on loan at Corinthians' partner club Flamengo-SP in 2015. He subsequently returned to Timão's under-20 squad after the 2015 Campeonato Paulista Série A3, but left the club in the end of 2016 as his contract expired; he subsequently agreed to a deal with CSA.

Dawhan featured regularly for CSA during the following seasons, achieving two consecutive promotions and reaching the Série A, aside from winning the 2017 Série C and two Campeonato Alagoano titles in a row. He made his top tier debut on 28 April 2019, starting in a 0–4 away loss against Ceará.

After suffering relegation, Dawhan agreed to a contract with Ponte Preta for the 2020 season. On 20 July 2021, he returned to the top tier after signing for Juventude.

On 2 February 2025, Chinese Super League side Beijing Guoan announced that Dawhan has completed the transfer to the club.

== Career statistics ==
As of match played 3 November 2026

Appearances and goals by club, season and competition
| Club | Season | League | | | State league | | Cup | | League cup | | Continental | | Other | | Total | |
| Club | Season | Division | Apps | Goals | Apps | Goals | Apps | Goals | Apps | Goals | Apps | Goals | Apps | Goals | Apps | Goals |
|---|---|---|---|---|---|---|---|---|---|---|---|---|---|---|---|---|
| Flamengo-SP | 2015 | Paulista A3 | — | | 17 | 0 | — | | — | | — | | — | | 17 | 0 |
| CSA (loan) | 2017 | Série C | 22 | 2 | 14 | 0 | 0 | 0 | — | | — | | 4 (Note: Appearance(s) in Copa do Nordeste) | 0 | 40 | 2 |
| CSA (loan) | 2018 | Série B | 16 | 1 | 10 | 0 | 2 | 0 | — | | — | | 4 | 0 | 32 | 1 |
| CSA (loan) | 2019 | Série A | 32 | 0 | 9 | 1 | 1 | 0 | — | | — | | 9 | 0 | 51 | 1 |
| CSA (loan) | Total | | 70 | 3 | 33 | 1 | 3 | 0 | — | | — | | 17 | 0 | 123 | 4 |
| Ponte Preta (loan) | 2020 | Série B | 32 | 3 | 13 | 1 | 5 | 0 | — | | — | | — | | 50 | 4 |
| Ponte Preta (loan) | 2021 | Série B | 12 | 2 | 13 | 0 | 2 | 0 | — | | — | | — | | 27 | 2 |
| Ponte Preta (loan) | Total | | 44 | 5 | 26 | 1 | 7 | 0 | — | | — | | — | | 77 | 6 |
| Juventude (loan) | 2021 | Série A | 23 | 3 | — | | — | | | | — | | — | | 23 | 3 |
| Gamba Osaka (loan) | 2022 | J1 League | 27 | 3 | — | | 2 | 0 | 3 | 0 | — | | — | | 32 | 3 |
| Gamba Osaka | 2023 | J1 League | 33 | 6 | — | | 0 | 0 | 7 | 1 | — | | — | | 40 | 7 |
| Gamba Osaka | 2024 | J1 League | 37 | 3 | — | | 6 | 1 | 1 | 0 | — | | — | | 44 | 4 |
| Gamba Osaka | Total | | 97 | 12 | — | | 8 | 1 | 11 | 1 | — | | — | | 116 | 14 |
| Beijing Guoan | 2025 | Chinese Super League | 26 | 1 | — | | 4 | 1 | — | | 3 | 0 | — | | 33 | 2 |
| Beijing Guoan | 2026 | Chinese Super League | 19 | 4 | — | | 0 | 0 | — | | 4 | 2 | 1 (Note: Appearance(s) in Chinese Super Cup) | 1 | 24 | 7 |
| Beijing Guoan | Total | | 45 | 5 | — | | 4 | 1 | — | | 7 | 2 | 1 | 1 | 57 | 8 |
| Career total | | | 279 | 28 | 76 | 2 | 22 | 2 | 11 | 1 | 7 | 2 | 18 | 1 | 413 | 36 |

== Honours ==
Beijing Guoan

- Chinese FA Cup: 2025
- Chinese FA Super Cup: 2026
