= Wu Shaocong =

Chinese footballer (born 2000)

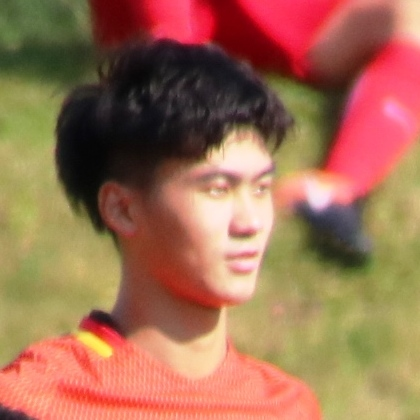
- Wu Shaocong in 2018

Personal information
- Date of birth: 20 March 2000 (age 26)
- Place of birth: Zhengzhou, Henan, China
- Height: 1.92 m (6 ft 4 in)
- Position: Centre-back

Team information
- Current team: Beijing Guoan
- Number: 2

Youth career
- –2017: Beijing FA
- 2017–2018: Beijing BSU
- 2018–2019: Shimizu S-Pulse
- 2018: → Kyoto Sanga (loan)

Senior career*
Years	Team	Apps	(Gls)
2019–2022	Guangzhou FC	54	(2)
2019	→ Kyoto Sanga (loan)	0	(0)
2023–2025	İstanbul Başakşehir	3	(0)
2023–2024	→ Gençlerbirliği (loan)	12	(0)
2024–2025	→ Radomiak Radom (loan)	0	(0)
2025–	Beijing Guoan	21	(0)

International career^{‡}
2018	China U19	4	(0)
2019–2022	China U22	5	(0)
2022–	China	7	(0)
Medal record
Representing China
Men's football
EAFF Championship
Bronze medal – third place	2022 Japan	Team
- * Club domestic league appearances and goals as of 13:25, 16 January 2026 (UTC) ‡ National team caps and goals as of 26 November 2023

Wu Shaocong (simplified Chinese: 吴少聪; traditional Chinese: 吳少聰; pinyin: Wú Shàocōng; born 20 March 2000) is a Chinese professional footballer who plays as a centre-back for Chinese Super League club Beijing Guoan and the China national team.

== Club career ==
=== Early career ===
After being selected for the Chinese U17 team, he played a game on 10 May 2016 against Iran U17 in a 2–1 defeat. His performance impressed Japanese football club Shimizu S-Pulse. On 30 March 2018, Wu made his move abroad to Shimizu S-Pulse's youth team.

=== Guangzhou Evergrande ===
On 3 February 2019, Wu returned to China to join top-flight club Guangzhou Evergrande, who immediately loaned him out to second-tier Japanese club Kyoto Sanga. Despite being promoted to the senior team, he did not receive any playing time for Kyoto Sanga and returned to Guangzhou. He made his senior debut in the final game of the season against Shanghai Shenhua on 1 December 2019, where he came on as a late substitute in a 3–0 victory.

On 16 October 2020, Wu scored his first career goal in a 3–1 win over Hebei China Fortune in the quarter-finals of the 2020 Chinese Super League championship playoffs.

=== İstanbul Başakşehir ===
On 10 January 2023, Wu signed for Süper Lig club İstanbul Başakşehir on a two-and-a-half-year contract, until the summer of 2025. This made Wu the first Chinese footballer to play professionally in Turkey. On 17 May 2023, Wu made his debut for the club in a 1–1 home draw against Ümraniyespor.

==== Loan to Gençlerbirliği ====
On 18 July 2023, Wu joined TFF First League club Gençlerbirliği on loan for the 2023-24 season.

==== Loan to Radomiak Radom ====
In early September 2024, Polish club Radomiak Radom agreed on a deal with İstanbul Başakşehir to loan Wu until the end of the season. After several weeks of waiting to obtain a work permit, Wu's signing was confirmed on 17 October. In January 2025, he was recalled by İstanbul without making an appearance.

=== Beijing Guoan ===
On 30 January 2025, İstanbul Başakşehir announced that Wu is leaving the Turkish side and joining Chinese Super League club Beijing Guoan.

== International career ==
On 24 July 2022, Wu made his international debut in a 0–0 draw against Japan in the 2022 EAFF E-1 Football Championship, as the Chinese FA decided to field the U-23 national team for this senior competition.

On 12 December 2023, Wu was named in China's squad for the 2023 AFC Asian Cup in Qatar.

== Career statistics ==
=== Club ===
As of 30 January 2025

Appearances and goals by club, season and competition
Club	Season	League			National cup (Note: Includes Chinese FA Cup, Turkish Cup)		Continental		Other		Total	
Club	Season	Division	Apps	Goals	Apps	Goals	Apps	Goals	Apps	Goals	Apps	Goals
Guangzhou Evergrande	2019	Chinese Super League	1	0	0	0	0	0	—		1	0
Guangzhou Evergrande	2020	Chinese Super League	9	1	1	0	2	0	—		12	1
Guangzhou Evergrande	2021	Chinese Super League	19	1	0	0	0	0	—		19	1
Guangzhou Evergrande	2022	Chinese Super League	25	0	0	0	0	0	—		25	0
Guangzhou Evergrande	Total		54	2	1	0	2	0	0	0	57	2
Kyoto Sanga (loan)	2019	J2 League	0	0	0	0	—		0	0	0	0
İstanbul Başakşehir	2022–23	Süper Lig	3	0	0	0	0	0	0	0	3	0
Gençlerbirliği	2023–24	TFF First League	12	0	3	0	—		0	0	15	0
Radomiak Radom (loan)	2024–25	Ekstraklasa	0	0	0	0	—		—		0	0
Career total			69	2	4	0	2	0	0	0	75	2

=== International ===
As of match played 1 January 2024

Appearances and goals by national team and year
National team	Year	Apps	Goals
China	2022	2	0
China	2023	4	0
China	2024	1	0
Total		7	0

== Honours ==
Guangzhou Evergrande

- Chinese Super League: 2019

Beijing Guoan

- Chinese FA Cup: 2025
- Chinese FA Super Cup: 2026
