= Jia Feifan =

Chinese footballer (born 2001)

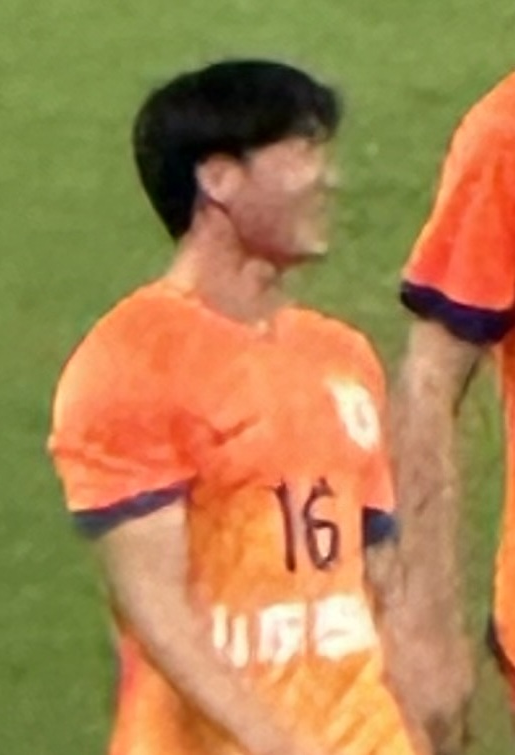
- Jia Feifan in August 2024

Personal information
- Date of birth: 13 January 2001 (age 25)
- Place of birth: Luohe, Henan, China
- Height: 1.78 m (5 ft 10 in)
- Position: Midfielder

Team information
- Current team: Beijing Guoan
- Number: 36

Senior career*
Years	Team	Apps	(Gls)
2021–2025	Shandong Taishan	8	(0)
2020	→ Zibo Cuju (loan)	3	(0)
2021	→ China U20 (loan)	13	(0)
2025	→ Qingdao Hainiu (loan)	11	(1)
2026–	Beijing Guoan	10	(0)

International career
2021	China U20		
2022–2024	China U23		
- * Club domestic league appearances and goals as of 19 November 2026

Jia Feifan (Chinese: 贾非凡; born 13 January 2001) is a Chinese professional footballer who plays as a midfielder for Chinese Super League club Beijing Guoan.

== Club career ==
Jia started his career with Chinese side Shandong Taishan. He was regarded as a prospect while playing for the club. In 2020, he was sent on loan to Chinese side Zibo Cuju.

On 14 January 2026, Jia joined Chinese Super League club Beijing Guoan on a permanent transfer.

== International career ==
Jia was a China youth international. He has captained the China national under-23 football team.

== Style of play ==
Jia mainly operates as a midfielder. He has been described as an "engineer-type player".

== Honours ==
Beijing Guoan

- Chinese FA Super Cup: 2026
