= Li Ruiyue =

Chinese footballer (born 2006)

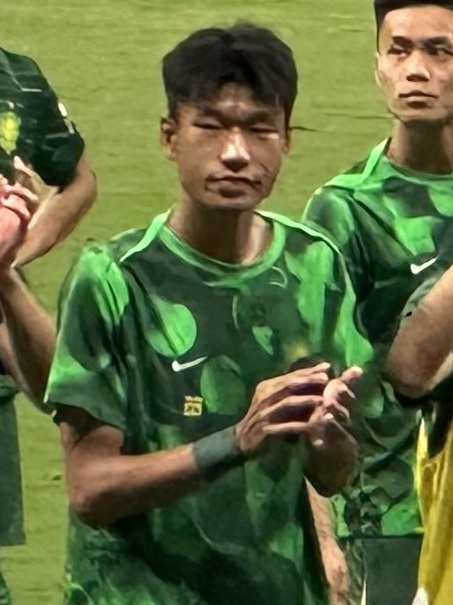
- Li Ruiyue in June 2025

Personal information
- Full name: Li Ruiyue
- Date of birth: 15 May 2006 (age 20)
- Place of birth: Zunyi, Guizhou, China
- Height: 1.92 m (6 ft 4 in)
- Position: Midfielder

Team information
- Current team: Foshan Nanshi (on loan from Beijing Guoan)
- Number: 16

Youth career
- 2014–2018: Chenxi
- 2018–2023: Shanghai Jiading Huilong

Senior career*
Years	Team	Apps	(Gls)
2023–2024	Shanghai Jiading Huilong	6	(0)
2025–	Beijing Guoan	4	(0)
2026–	→ Foshan Nanshi (loan)	0	(0)
- * Club domestic league appearances and goals as of 8 March 2026

Li Ruiyue (simplified Chinese: 李睿跃; traditional Chinese: 李睿躍; pinyin: Lǐ Ruìyuè; born 15 May 2006) is a Chinese professional footballer who plays as a midfielder for China League One club Foshan Nanshi on loan from Beijing Guoan. He is a product of the Shanghai Jiading Huilong youth academy.

== Early life ==
Born in Zunyi, Guizhou, Li Ruiyue was educated at Zunyi Huichuan No. 1 Primary School in Huichuan District, and was part of the school's football team. He received professional training at a local club called Chenxi.

== Club career ==
=== Shanghai Jiading Huilong ===
In 2018, after winning several local football championships with his school in his hometown, Li Ruiyue was scouted by Shanghai Jiading Huilong and joined their youth team as the team's captain. He was promoted to the club's first-team before the 2023 season, signing a professional contract and wearing the number 28 shirt. On 17 May 2024, Li Ruiyue made his senior and professional debut, coming on as a 76th minute for Zhang Aokai in a Chinese FA Cup tie with Rizhao Yuqi in a 2–0 loss. On 29 September 2024, he made his China League One debut, after replacing Gong Chunjie in the 81st minute in a 2–0 win over Wuxi Wugo. In total in the 2024 season, Li Ruiyue made seven appearances in all competitions.

=== Beijing Guoan ===
On 2 February 2025, Li transferred to Chinese Super League club Beijing Guoan, continuing to wear the number 28 shirt as he did at Shanghai Jiading Huilong. Li made his club and Chinese Super League debut on 19 April 2025 in a 6–1 home league win against Shandong Taishan, coming on as an 81st minute substitute for Guga. On 16 August 2025, Li made his first start for the club in a 3–1 away league victory against Qingdao West Coast, playing 64 minutes of the match.

==== Loan to Foshan Nanshi ====
On 11 March 2026, China League One club Foshan Nanshi announced that Li has joined the club on a season-long loan from Guoan.

== International career ==
On 20 August 2021, Li Ruiyue was called up to the China U17 national team for a friendly cup competition. His China U17 B team came second place in the competition.

== Style of play ==
Li said in an interview that, as a defensive midfielder, he prefers to play with intelligence and technique, and that he models himself after Sergio Busquets. Shanghai Jiading Huilong claimed that his runs and positional awareness were his strongsuits.

== Career statistics ==
As of 11 November 2025

Appearances and goals by club, season, and competition
Club	Season	League			Cup		Continental		Other		Total	
Club	Season	Division	Apps	Goals	Apps	Goals	Apps	Goals	Apps	Goals	Apps	Goals
Shanghai Jiading Huilong	2023	China League One	0	0	0	0	–		–		0	0
Shanghai Jiading Huilong	2024	China League One	6	0	1	0	–		–		7	0
Shanghai Jiading Huilong	Total		6	0	1	0	0	0	0	0	7	0
Beijing Guoan	2025	Chinese Super League	4	0	0	0	1 (Note: Appearances in AFC Champions League Two)	0	–		5	0
Career total			10	0	1	0	1	0	0	0	12	0

== Honours ==
Beijing Guoan

- Chinese FA Cup: 2025
