= Bai Yang (footballer) =

Chinese association football player

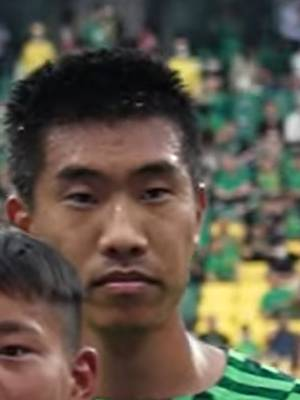
- Bai Yang in June 2023

Personal information
- Date of birth: 6 March 1998 (age 28)
- Place of birth: Zouping, Shandong, China
- Height: 1.92 m (6 ft 4 in)
- Position: Defender

Team information
- Current team: Beijing Guoan
- Number: 26

Youth career
- 2010–2018: Changchun Yatai
- 2019: Shenyang Xinyuanxiang
- 2019–2020: Real Murcia

Senior career*
Years	Team	Apps	(Gls)
2021–	Beijing Guoan	101	(1)

International career
2017	China U20		
- * Club domestic league appearances and goals as of 19 November 2026

Bai Yang (simplified Chinese: 柏杨; traditional Chinese: 柏楊; pinyin: Bǎi Yáng; born 6 March 1998) is a Chinese professional footballer currently playing as a defender for Chinese Super League club Beijing Guoan.

== Club career ==
Bai Yang would play for the Changchun Yatai youth team before having to go through arbitration to join amateur side Shenyang Xinyuanxiang and then subsequently going abroad in 2019 to join Spanish side Real Murcia.

=== Beijing Guoan ===
On 1 April 2021 he returned to China to join top tier club Beijing Guoan on a free transfer. He would be promoted to their senior team within the 2021 Chinese Super League season and would make his debut in a league game on 19 July 2021 against Tianjin Jinmen Tiger F.C. in a 0-0 draw. On 28 May 2023, Bai scored his first goal for Guoan in a 3-2 away defeat against Zhejiang F.C.

== Career statistics ==
As of 11 August 2024.

Club	Season	League			Cup		Continental		Other		Total	
Club	Season	Division	Apps	Goals	Apps	Goals	Apps	Goals	Apps	Goals	Apps	Goals
Beijing Guoan	2021	Chinese Super League	9	0	0	0	0	0	-		9	0
Beijing Guoan	2022	Chinese Super League	17	0	1	0	-		-		18	0
Beijing Guoan	2023	Chinese Super League	19	1	2	0	-		-		21	0
Beijing Guoan	2024	Chinese Super League	11	0	1	0	-		-		12	0
Beijing Guoan	Total		56	1	4	0	0	0	0	0	60	1
Career total			56	1	4	0	0	0	0	0	60	1

== Honours ==
Beijing Guoan

- Chinese FA Cup: 2025
- Chinese FA Super Cup: 2026
