= Chen Kangyue =

Chinese professional footballer

Personal information
- Full name: Chen Kangyue
- Position: Midfielder

Team information
- Current team: Beijing Guoan
- Number: 59

Youth career
- Beijing Guoan youth

Senior career*
Years	Team	Apps	(Gls)
2026–	Beijing Guoan		

International career^{‡}
2025	China U18		
2026	China U19		
- * Club domestic league appearances and goals as of 9 November 2026 ‡ National team caps and goals as of 9 November 2026

Chen Kangyue (simplified Chinese: 陈康悦; traditional Chinese: 陳康悅; pinyin: Chén Kāngyuè; born 2008) is a Chinese professional footballer who plays as a midfielder for Chinese Super League club Beijing Guoan.

== Youth career ==
Chen came through the Beijing Guoan youth system, progressing from the U15 to the U20 team. He later captained the Beijing Guoan U18 team.

== Club career ==
=== Beijing Guoan ===
In July 2026, Beijing Guoan officially registered Chen and five other U20 players for the first team. He was assigned the squad number 59. During the 2026 season with the U20 team, he had scored nine goals in various competitions. He scored a hat-trick in a 6–1 win over Qingdao Red Lions U20 on 13 May 2026. He also scored twice in a 7–1 win over Hubei Istar U20 in July 2026.

== International career ==
In August 2025, Chen was added to the China U18 team after the coaching staff led by Jiu'erjevic expressed interest in him during the 6th Zhonghe Guoan Cup. In September 2026, he was included in the China U19 squad.

== Career statistics ==
=== Club ===
As of 9 November 2026

Appearances and goals by club, season and competition
Club	Season	League			National Cup		Continental		Other		Total	
Club	Season	Division	Apps	Goals	Apps	Goals	Apps	Goals	Apps	Goals	Apps	Goals
Beijing Guoan	2026	Chinese Super League	0	0	0	0	—		—		0	0
Career total			0	0	0	0	0	0	0	0	0	0

== Honours ==
Beijing Guoan U18

- Zhonghe Guoan Cup: 2025
- Zhonghe Guoan Cup Best Player: 2025
