= 2026 Chinese FA Super Cup =

Shanghai Port	Beijing Guoan
0	2
- Date: 1 March 2026
- Venue: Nanjing Olympic Sports Centre, Nanjing
- Man of the Match: Dawhan
- Referee: Li Haixin (Guangdong FA)
- Attendance: 40,169

The Xue Hua Pi Jiu CFA Super Cup 2026 (Chinese: 雪花啤酒2026中国足球协会超级杯) was the 21st Chinese FA Super Cup, an annual football match contested by the winners of the previous season's Chinese Super League and FA Cup competitions. The match will be played between Shanghai Port, champions of the 2025 Chinese Super League and Beijing Guoan, the winner of the 2025 Chinese FA Cup.

== Match ==
=== Details ===
1 March 2026
15:30 UTC+8

Shanghai Port	0–2	Beijing Guoan
	Reports	Dawhan 31'; Cao Yongjing 84'

Nanjing Olympic Sports Centre, Nanjing
Attendance: 40,169
Referee: Li Haixin (Guangdong FA)

Assistant referees:
Guo Jingtao (Shandong FA)
Ma Ji (Hubei FA)
Fourth official:
Huang Yi (Jiangsu FA)
Video assistant referee:
Tang Shunqi (Chengdu FA)
Assistant video assistant referee:
Guan Changliang (Jiangsu FA)
