= 2024 Beijing Guoan F.C. season =

Beijing Guoan F.C.'s 60th season in football competition

Beijing Guoan
2024 season
- CEO: Zhou Jinhui
- General Manager: Li Ming
- Manager: Ricardo Soares
- Stadium: Workers' Stadium
- Super League: 4th
- FA Cup: Quarter-finals
- Top goalscorer: League: Fábio Abreu (14); All: Fábio Abreu (15)
- Highest home attendance: 54,189 vs Shandong Taishan (30 June 2024, Super League)
- Lowest home attendance: 35,343 vs Cangzhou Mighty Lions (26 June 2024, Super League)
- Average home league attendance: 46,444
- Biggest win: 8–1 vs Changchun Yatai (Home, 28 September 2024, Super League)
- Biggest defeat: 1–5 vs Shanghai Port (Away, 12 July 2024, Super League)
Home colours	Away colours

The 2024 season was Beijing Guoan F.C.'s 60th season in Chinese football competitions. This season marked the club's 21st consecutive season in the Chinese Super League since the league's inaugural season in 2004, and it was the club's 34th consecutive season in the top-flight of Chinese football. It covered a period from 1 January 2024 to 31 December 2024.

Guoan finished 4th in the domestic league, and was a quarter-finalist in the season's edition of the Chinese FA Cup. Guoan also qualified for the 2025–26 AFC Champions League Two.

== Summary ==
=== Pre-season ===
Guoan players returned to training in Beijing on 2 January ahead of the team's planned winter training camp in Portugal. Full-back He Yupeng was on a trial at Guoan as he participated in training sessions. Gao Tianyi did not participate in the initial training and later announced his departure from the club on social media on 5 January.

On 10 January, Guoan players traveled to Portugal to begin the team's first training camp. Guoan played a training match against Portimonense's U-23 team and won 5–1 on 18 January. On 24 January, Guoan played Portuguese fourth-tier club Louletano and won 3–1 thanks to goals from Fábio Abreu, Zhang Xizhe, and Wang Ziming.

On 27 January, Guoan's pre-season training continued with back-to-back friendlies with Czech side Slavia Prague. In the first match, despite Abreu scoring in the 2nd minute, Guoan went on to concede 3 in the second half and lost 1–3. In the second match, a rotated team held on to a 0–0 draw.

Continuing its pre-season training camp, Guoan played against two training matches on 31 January. In the morning, the team played against Portuguese team Moncarapachense and won 2–0 thanks to goals from Yu Dabao. In the afternoon, Guoan played against Faroese club KÍ as part of the Atlantic Cup tournament with Guoan winning 1–0 thanks to an Abreu goal in the 5th minute. On the same day, the club also announced contract extension with Zhang Yuning, Hou Sen, Yang Liyu, Li Ke, Zhang Chengdong, and Jiang Wenhao.

2 February saw Rio Ave, former club for Portuguese player Guga, announce his transfer to Beijing Guoan.

Guoan played 2 further training matches on 6 February, the last day of the team's Portugal training, winning 1–0 against Louletano and 2–0 against Farense.

The team returned for Guoan on 8 February with plans of regrouping on the 13 February in Guangzhou after the Chinese New Year celebration. On the same day, the club announced a contract extension to the end of 2025 with manager Ricardo Soares. The league calendar was also announced on 8 February, and Guoan is set to start of the season with 3 away games against Cangzhou Mighty Lions, Shangdong Tainshan, and Wuhan Three Towns respectively.

On 13 February, the team gathered in Guangdong to start the next winter training camp ahead of the season. The next day, Guoan officially announced the signing of Mamadou Traoré, He Yupeng, Guga, Lin Liangming, and Zhang Yixuan. He and Lin transferred from the disbanded Dalian Pro, Traoré came from Qatari club Muaither, and Zhang Yixuan came from Hubei Istar. The players would wear number 2, 3, 8, 11, and 40 respectively. The same day, Croatian media reports that Marko Dabro, who spent the last season on loan at Latvian club Riga, has signed for Croatian side Varaždin as his contract with Guoan was terminated by mutual agreement.

Guoan played a friendly against Yunnan Yukun on 19 February in the team's Guangdong training sessions. 3 periods of 40 minutes were played with Guoan emerging victorious thanks Zhang Xizhe assist a header from Wang Ziming in the third period. Guoan's last set of friendly games came on 24 February. The team won 2–0 against Guangxi Pingguo Haliao thanks to goals from new arrivals Guga and Lin Liangming, but lost 2–3 to Liaoning Tieren with Yang Liyu and Samuel Adegbenro scoring Guoan's two goals.

Ahead of the start of the new season on 28 February, Soares announced that the club has registered Adegbenro ahead of Kang Sang-Woo for the beginning of the season. Per CSL rules, Kang would not be able to participate in club matches until at least the start of the summer window when registration is again possible. Soares said the decision was difficult, but Adegbenro was picked in the end due to being better in 1-on-1 situations comparatively.

=== March ===
Guoan played its first league game of the season on 2 March away at Cangzhou Mighty Lions. The team lined up in a new 3-4-3 formation: Traoré, Ngadeu-Ngadjui and Bai Yang lined up as a back three behind Guga and Chi Zhongguo, Li Lei and Wang Gang provided support from the flanks, and Zhang Yuning, Abreu and Lin Liangming led the line. Guoan opened the scoring in the 14th minute as Wang Gang provided a cross for Zhang Yuning to finish inside the box and score on his 100th appearance for Guoan. Following the goal, goalkeeper Hou Sen made a number of important saves and interventions to keep Cangzhou at bay. In the third minute of added time in the second half, Adegbenro was tripped inside Cangzhou's box and won a penalty, which substitute Yang Liyu finished with a powerful shot up high. Guoan notched its first victory of the season with the 2–0 win. New singing He Yupeng also made his debut in the game, replacing a tired Wang Gang at the left wing-back position in the 86th minute.

The club bid farewell to Kang Sang-woo, whose spot on the team was given to Adegbenro after the winter transfer window, on 6 March with the club announcing officially that his contract was terminated. He joined the team ahead of the 2022 season and scored 13 goals and provided 12 assists across 59 games in all competitions during his time with the team. He later signed for Korean K League 1 club FC Seoul.

Guoan travelled to play Shandong Taishan on matchday 2 on 9 March. Guoan lined up similar to last week with a recovered Li Ke taking the place of Chi Zhongguo. Shandong, however, rotated heavily from their midweek AFC Champions League lineup with only 2 players starting both games. Abreu missed a good chance in the 4th minute, and the scoreline remained 0–0 at half-time. In the 53rd minute, Zhang Yuning tried an overhead pass, and Abreu slotted it into the net; however, the goal was ruled offside due to referees judging Lin Liangming, who made no contact with the ball, started his motion in an offside position and impeded defence. Guoan had a number of opportunities late in the game, but failed to score. The game ended in a 0–0 draw. Wang Gang, who started the game but was substituted off in the 60th minute due to having been subjected to two strong tackles from Shandong players, was confirmed on 10 March to have suffered a hairline fracture of his fibula in his left leg and is expected to be absent from the team for 2 months.

As Li Ke, Li Lei, Lin Liangming, and Zhang Yuning travelled for international break, Guoan played a training match against Cangzhou Mighty Lions on 17 March with Guoan winning 6–1. Abreu contributed 3 goals, Cao Yongjing 2, and Nebijan Muhmet the last. Guoan played another training match on 23 March with Qingdao Hainiu and won 2–1. Hainiu scored first, but Zhang Xizhe leveled with a direct free kick, and a Fang Hao assist for Abreu helped turn the game around.

In the afternoon on 30 March, Guoan travelled to Wuhan to face Wuhan Three Towns in the first league fixture after the international break. He Yupeng replaced the injured Wang Gang in the starting line-up while Yang Liyu started for the first time this season with Zhang Yuning being rested. Little occurred in the first half with media observing both teams played defensively and knocked passes around the back line instead of forward. Li Lei provided a threatening cross into the box immediately after the break, but Lin Liangming's header was saved by Wuhan's goalie. Seeking change in the attack, Soares brought on Adegbenro and Fang Hao, and both players helped Guoan open up the game. in the 74th minute, a He Yupeng cross from the right reached Adegbenro, who knocked the ball back across the box to Abreu, and Abreu finished with an overhead kick that ended in the back of the net and giving Guoan a 1–0 lead. Traoré cleared a Wuhan header off the line in the 93rd minute, and the game ended in a 1–0 victory for Guoan. The game, Guoan's first win ever against Three Towns, helped the team end its three-game away sequence with 2 wins and a draw and sending the team up to 4th place. After Abreu scored his goal, Guoan players celebrated by lifting up a shirt that read "Yang Xue Fight On (Chinese: 杨雪加油)," showing support to a long-term Guoan fan who was fighting severe illness. She died a few days after the match, and Guoan CEO Zhou Jinhui announced that her seat in the Workers' Stadium will not accommodate other supporters in the future. Abreu was nominated for player of the matchday for his goal.

=== April ===

Beijing Guoan's home opener v Shanghai Port starting line-up, 5 April 2024

On 5 April, Guoan played its first match in front of the home crowd this season against the reigning champions, Shanghai Port. Ahead of the game, fans from both teams commemorated the passing Guoan supporter Yang Xue in a stadium-wide ceremony. For the game itself, Zhang Xizhe started his first game of the season after serving his cross-season 7-game suspension, and Jiang Wenhao replaced Li Lei in the line-up for his first appearance of the season. Guoan conceded first in the 10th minute from a corner as Wu Lei scored from outside the box from a corner with no Guoan players defending the edge of the penalty area. In the 13th minute, Abreu was withdrawn due to injury suffered in the opening minutes with Zhang Yuning suiting up. In the 27th minute, Guoan levelled the game as Bai Yang, venturing up the field, knocked the ball across the edge of Port's box and found Guga, who comfortably placed the ball into the goal. A Port goal was ruled off in the 33rd minute as the referee judged the attacking player roughed goalkeeper Hou Sen. At halftime, Soares replaced Lin Liangming with Adegbenro. In the 66th minute, another Port goal was written off as the attacking movement was offside. In the 81st minute, Guoan substitute Fang Hao was tripped by Port player in the box, and the referee awarded Guoan a penalty, which Zhang Yuning finished to give Guoan a 2–1 lead. However, the team failed to hold onto the lead, as they conceded from a Wu Lei header in the sixth minute of added time. Guoan drew the game 2–2 in the end but remain four games unbeaten so far this season.

Just 4 days later, Guoan lined up in Workers' Stadium against newly promoted Shengzhen Peng City. Soares rotated the wingers, opting to start Cao Yongjing and Fang Hao, and played a 4-3-3 instead of the 3-4-3 that the team used in previous games. In the 23rd minute, Ngadeu-Ngadjui conceded a free kick just outside the box after having been judged to have handed the ball. Li Zhi's attempt was deflected into the net by a Guoan player, handing Guoan a 0–1 deficit. In the 39th minute, Zhang Yuning scored off of a Cao Yongjing cross, but the latter was judged to have committed a foul on a Shenzhen player in the attacking action and the goal was thus ruled out after review. In the 64th minute, He Yupeng handled the ball with his hand inside the box, and Guoan went two goals down after Shenzhen's Edu García converted from the spot. In the 90th minute, Adebgenro was fouled inside Shenzhen's box, and the referee awarded Guoan a penalty after a 5-minute review. Zhang Xizhe scored from the penalty kick, halving Guoan's deficit. However, despite bringing on multiple attacking players, Guoan ultimately failed to make additional inroads, and ended the match with a 1–2 loss, the team's first of the season.

Guoan traveled to Shanghai to face old rival Shenhua on 13 April. Shenhua was the presumed favorite coming off of 5 consecutive wins. Guoan continued the 4-man backline and Soares named Zhang Yuan to the starting lineup for the first time in his Guoan career. Despite a good shenhua chance in the 2nd minute, it was Guoan that opened the scoring first. Lin Liangming knocked the ball to Zhang Yuning up the pitch, and Zhang Yuning danced his way through Shenhua defenders and powered the ball past keeper Bao Yaxiong. In the 24th minute, Fang Hao's cross found an unguarded Lin Liangming in the box, but Lin failed to convert. In the following Shenhua attack, André Luis skipped past both Li Ke and Li Lei and bent the ball into Hou Sen's far corner for a Shenhua equalizer. Neither team made progress later, but He Yupeng was sent off on a second yellow in the 81st minute after having committed an aggressive foul. The score remained 1–1 in the end.

Guoan returned to Workers' Stadium to play newly promoted Qingdao West Coast on 21 April. Keen to finally win at home, Ngadeu-Ngadjui headed the ball into the net on the end of a Zhang Xizhe free kick in just the 6th minute, giving Guoan a 1–0 lead. A Zhang Yuning goal was ruled offside in the 41st minute after video review. 8 minutes into the second half, West Coast's Varazdat Haroyan was sent off by a straight red card after a bad foul on Lin Liangming. Playing a man up, Guoan found the game easy. Li Ke scored for the first time in 5 years in the 63rd minute from outside the box after a poor West Coast clearance, and Wang Ziming put Guoan 3 goals up after punching in a Li Lei cross. West Coast hit Guoan on the counter in the 90th minute and reduced the deficit by a goal, but Adegbenro put the game to rest by scoring another in the 96th minute. Guoan claimed its first home victory of the season as a result of the 4–1 win, moving up to 5th place.

On 26 April, Guoan played Zhejiang away in the Yellow Dragon Sports Center. Guoan started the game with energy as the team sought to halt its three-game losing streak against Zhejiang, but was quickly pegged back for the majority of the first half. Against the wind in the second minute of added time before the break, Zhang Xizhe sent a through ball forward for Zhang Yuning to chase, and the latter slid it into the far corner to give Guoan a crucial lead. In the 52nd minute, Li Ke intercepted the ball from a sloppy Zhejiang player and set up Cao Yongjing, who punched the ball past the Zhejiang keeper and put Guoan two goals in front. In the 82nd minute, a controversial call saw Yang Liyu judged to have committed a foul in the penalty box after a lengthy video review, but Hou Sen managed to save the penalty. However, Guoan was unable to keep the clean sheet to the end of the game, conceding once in chaos in the 96th minute. The eventual 2–1 victory for Guoan saw Guoan break 1,000 total points won in the Chinese Super League and helped the team extend its record-breaking undefeated away run to 11 games. A referee review panel convened by the Chinese FA later reviewed the penalty ruling against Guoan and judged the penalty award was a mistake.

The last match in April saw Guoan travel to Tianjin to play against Jinmen Tiger. Guoan lined up with some rotation: Adegbenro and Yu Dabao started for the first time of the season. Guoan was dealt a blow in the 15th minute with Zhang Yuan sent off after a video review judged him of having committed a violent foul on a Tianjin player. Playing a man down, however, Guoan opened the scoring first in the 51st minute of the game. A He Yupeng crossed missed everyone and reached Adebgenro on the far side of the pitch, and Adegbenro floated the ball back into the box for the onrushing Cao Yongjing to slice into Tianjin's goal for a Guoan lead. Despite an onslaught by Tianjin, Guoan held on to the 1–0 lead thanks to 8 saves from Hou Sen, extending the team's cross-season undefeated away run to a record-high 12 games.

=== May ===
Guoan started May at home against Chengdu Rongcheng on 5 May. Guoan started well against the third-placed Chengdu. In the 12th minute, Guga intercepted the ball and drove it forward to the edge of the penalty area, and then launched a shot that went above the goalkeeper and into the net for a Guoan lead. Guoan doubled the lead in the 1st minute of added time with Fabio wrestling the ball into the goal after a corner. Despite leading, however, Guoan was pegged back in the second half and conceded a goal in the 52nd minute. The 2–1 score held on to the end, giving Guoan 4 wins in a row and elevating the team to third place on the league standings.

Guoan produced a turnaround masterclass on 11 May against Meizhou Hakka at home. Meizhou opened the scoring in 19th minute after a Traoré interception failed to clear the ball and allowed Meizhou to get a shot off for a 0–1 lead. Soares opted to attack and swapped He Yupeng for Fang Hao in the 38th minute, but Guoan conceded again in the 45th with Hou Sen failing to get ahold of a Meizhou cross, allowing Wang Jia'nan to tap the ball into the goal. In the second half, Soares brought on Lin Liangming, Zhang Yuan and Yu Dabao to continue the pressure. The turning point of the fame came in the 74th minute when Meizhou player Pan Ximing was shown a red card for stepping on Abreu. Playing with 10 men, Meizhou failed to hold on to their lead. In the 76th minute, Lin Liangming headed in a goal at the end of a Li Lei cross from the left wing. In the 82nd minute, Yu Dabao, who failed to score for the whole of the 2023 season, bent a Zhang Yuning pass into the far corner from outside the box to tie the game at 2–2. Three minutes later, Fang Hao headed in a Abreu cross in a scramble inside the box, completing Guoan's turnaround at 3–2. The victory gave Guoan a 5-game win streak with the team just 3 points behind the league leaders.

Guoan's second defeat of the season came away at last-place Changchun Yatai on 17 May. Soares was unavailable on the sidelines as he was suspended for having received two yellow cards prior to the match. In the 4th minute, an error from Ngadeu-Ngadjui allowed Yatai's Robert Berić to slide a pass to Serginho, sending Guoan a goal down. Guoan pulled a goal back in the 30th minute with Abreu heading in a Zhang Xizhe corner. The first half ended even. In the second half, Yatai opened the scoring again in the 67th minute with Guilherme dribbling past Li Lei and curving the ball past Hou Sen into the far corner. Guoan drew level in the 93rd minute as a Guoan free kick from the halfway line allowed Traoré to knock the ball down towards Abreu, who put it into the back of the net for 2–2. However, just moments later, Zhang Yuan committed a foul in Guoan's penalty area and Changchun was awarded a penalty kick after video review. Peter Žulj sent Hou Sen the wrong way, and the game ended in a 2–3 defeat for Guoan, ending the team's 5-game win streak and knocking the team back down to 4th place on the league standings.

Guoan traveled to play last-placed Qingdao Hainiu on 21 May. The match was played behind closed doors as Hainiu was cited for disciplinary violations prior to the game. With Guoan's starters on the left flank, namely Li Lei, Zhang Yuning and Lin Liangming, all injured, Soares rotated the squad, starting Jiang Wenhao, Yu Dabao, Cao Yongjing, and Feng Boxuan. After a mostly routine first half, captain Yu Dabao was sent off with a second yellow card in the first minute of added time in the first half. Although playing a man down, Guoan scored first via Cao Yongjing in the 54th minute thanks to an assist from Abreu. However, Guoan gave up the lead in the 72nd minute as Hou Sen's failure to intercept a cross led to a Hainiu goal. In the 87th minute, Abreu fell in the Hainiu penalty area and Guoan players claimed for penalty, but the referee did not rule on the potential foul and the video assistant referee did not intervene. The game ended in a 1–1 draw with Guoan dropping points again against relegation zone opponents.

Guoan's last game in May came against Nantong Zhiyun at home on 26 May. The game turned out to be an open-ended affair. Eager to win after a loss and a draw, Guoan stroke first with Abreu heading into a He Yupeng floater in the 5th minute and followed up with a He Yupeng header from a Zhang Xizhe corner in the 8th. However, Nantong pulled a goal back in the 23rd through a corner. In the 63rd minute, Abreu managed to pick a pass to Cao Yongjing through a pack of defenders, allowing the latter to score for a 3–1 lead. Yet, in the 73rd minute, Guoan conceded again as Nantong's Puclin placed a firmed shot to the bottom corner of Guoan's goal. Soares decided to continue attacking, bringing on Fang Hao and Nebijan Muhmet. In the 88th minute, a Fang Hao header at the end of a Nebijan Muhmet's cross was pushed away by Nantong's keeper but fell luckily to Abreu, who finished for a 4–2 Guoan lead. Fang Hao added another to Guoan's tally by scoring from outside the box in the 91st minute. Guoan won the game 5–2 and maintained its 4th place on the league standing.

=== June ===
As the league paused for international break, Guoan played a training match against Qingdao Hainiu on 8 June with Guoan winning 3–1 thanks Zhang Chengdong, Abreu, and Yu Dabao.

On 15 June, Guoan returned to league action, traveling to face 14th-placed Henan. Henan generated many chances in the first half, hitting the crossbar just 5 minutes into the game and threatened Hou Sen's goal multiple times. In the 30th minute, Guoan opened the scoring against the run of play with Cao Yongjing assisting Lin Liangming. However, Henan leveled in the 52nd minute via Bruno Nazário. Henan continued to generate chances while Guoan struggled to contain the opposition. Substitutes, including the recently recovered Wang Gang, failed to turn the tide of the game. Guoan conceded again in the 91st minute as Nemanja Čović headed the ball into Guoan's net. Guoan slipped to 5th place after the game while allowing Henan to win for the first time in 7 matches, and Hou Sen sustained a heavy knee injury during the match that would see him out of the team for 2 months.

Defender Liang Shaowen was loaned out to Nantong Zhiyun in search of more game time on 19 June 2024.

Guoan began its FA Cup campaign for the season on 22 June at second-division club Suzhou Dongwu. In the 20th minute, Suzhou's Xiang Rongjun was sent off for a foul from behind on Lin Liangming, and Zhang Xizhe placed the resulting free kick in the top right corner for a 1–0 Guoan lead. In the 34th minute, Guoan doubled the lead when Lin Liangming finished off the rebound of an Adebgenro header. In the 75th minute, substitute Yu Dabao flicked a Li Lei pass away from a defender and chipped the ball past the keeper for 3–0. Wang Ziming sealed the game in the 81nd minute as he guided a Fang Hao cross from the right into the goal. Guoan advanced to the next round and was drawn against second-division Wuxi Wugo.

Riding on the cup victory, Guoan returned home to face Cangzhou Mighty Lions on 26 June to start the back half of the league campaign. In the 17th minute, Adegbenro helped Guoan to an 1–0 lead by sliding in a Ngadeu-Ngadjui long ball directly from the back line. Guoan doubled the tally in the 32 minute, this time Abreu finishing off a Adegbenro dish at a tight angle. Abreu's goal was Guoan's 1,600th in all competition since the club's founding. In the 84th minute, Yang Liyu was allowed by Cangzhou's defense to wander and nailed a long-range shot to the far corner for 3–0. Wang Ziming was fouled in added time, and scored the subsequent penalty to see Guoan to consecutive 4–0 victories.

The last game of the month saw Guoan face off against Shandong Taishan, against which the team has not won since 2020, on 30 June at home. In an electrifying start to the match, Guoan opened the scoring after just 4 minutes: Abreu notched Li Lei's throw to Adebgenro, who finished with power past Wang Dalei for a 1–0 Guoan lead. Just 1 minute later, Adegbenro returned the favor and assisted Abreu with a cross across the penalty area for a 2–0 lead. Despite Taishan's onslaught, Han Jiaqi made 9 saves to keep a clean sheet and secured Guoan's 2–0 victory in front of a record-high 54,189 fans.

=== July ===
On 7 July, Guoan announced the signing of goalkeeper Zheng Tuluo. Later on the same day, Guoan hosted Wuhan Three Towns in the 18th matchday for CSL in a chaotic game. Li Lei, who was fouled early in the game, could not continue, and was replaced by Feng Boxuan in the 22nd minute. In the 33rd minute, Wuhan's Deng Hanwen, who had injured Li Lei with an earlier tackle, was sent off with a red card after a rough foul on Adegbenro. Despite being a man up, Guoan conceded in the 40th minute to a Wuhan counter. Starting the second half, Soares replaced Feng, who had just came on, with Nebijan Muhmet to bolster attack. In the 66th minute, Guoan's Traoré was sent off for a rough foul, evening the match to 10 players each. Despite bringing on Fang Hao, Yang Liyu and Wang Ziming to strengthen Guoan's attack, Wuhan first doubled their lead in the 85th minute. Nebijan later received a blow to the head, having to be replaced by He Yupeng. in the 94th minute, Li Ke assisted Abreu for a headed goal, but Guoan failed to make additional progress, losing to Wuhan 1–2 at home.

Guoan traveled to Shanghai to play against league leaders Shanghai Port on 12 July. With injuries and suspension on the back line, Soares lined up He Yupeng at left back, Zhang Chengdong alongside Ngadeu-Ngadjui in the middle, and Wang Gang at right back. Despite Port hitting the crossbar early on in the game, Guoan took the lead in the 13th minute with Lin Liangming nodding home a Zhang Xizhe corner. However, the game quickly became a Port highlight reel. Mere three minutes after Guoan's goal, Port's Wu Lei, the league leader in goals, was allowed space inside the box and scored to tie the game 1–1. In the 30th minute, Wu Lei assisted Gustavo to send Guoan 1–2 down. Three minutes later, Gustavo scored against while battling a shaky Zhang Chengdong. In the 58th minute, a Li Ke mistake allowed Wu Lei to provide another assist to Oscar. In the 71st minute, Wu Lei scored in close range to put Port 5–1 up. The game, which ended with a 1–5 Guoan loss, is tied for Guoan's second-worse loss in team history with the previous 1–5 loss coming also against Port in 2017. In the post-match interview, Soares claimed that he was "unsatisfied" with the team's performance. Later, it was reported that CEO Zhou Jinhui was angry about the team's disappointing performance and recent form, and demanded the coaching staff to make immediate adjustments.

Guoan bounced back in the FA cup fifth round match against Wuxi Wugo on 17 July. Before the match kicked off, Guoan players held up a number 12 shirt for the Guoan academy player Zhang Zhongyi who died suddenly in the days prior to the match as a tribute. In the 12th minute, Yang Liyu scored from a Cao Yongjing corner, and the former dedicated his goal to Zhang. Despite Wuxi's Zhu Haiwei scoring a screamer in the 71st minute, Guoan would emerge victorious thanks to late goals from Abreu and Zhang Yuning. The 3–1 win saw Guoan through to the quarter-finals, where the team would play against old rivals Shanghai Shenhua.

Guoan returned home to play against regional rival Tianjin Jinmen Tiger on 21 July. Soares opted for a 4-4-2 to accommodate both Abreu and Zhang Yuning, who has since returned from injury. The first half ended in a 0–0 draw with Han Jiaqi denying a Ba Dun header. In the second half, Zhang Yuan replaced an injured Li Ke and put on a masterclass. In the 67th minute, his long ball found Abreu, whose shot was parried away by Tianjin's keeper but fell to Guga, who crashed the ball into the net for a 1–0 Guoan lead. In the 98th minute, Zhang Yuan initiated an attacking movement by sending the ball wide to Yang Liyu, and later finished off the same movement after receiving Yang's assist by sliding the ball to the far post past Tianjin's keeper. Han Jiaqi also made a number of saves to keep the clean sheet. Breaking a 2-game losing streak in the league, Guoan's win allowed it to hold on its 4th place.

On 26 July, Guoan traveled play against Shenzhen Peng City. After a dull first half in the rain that saw both teams scoreless, Guoan broke through in the 54th minute via Zhang Yuning. However, the goal was ruled offside. In the 73rd minute, an Ngadeu back pass lacked power and was intercepted by Shenzhen player, forcing Han Jiaqi to commit a foul and give away a penalty. Shenzhen's Edu García converted the spot kick, leaving Guoan 1–0 down. Despite a number of chances to level the game afterwards, Guoan failed to do so and ended the game with a 1–0 loss. Guoan lost both league matches to Shenzhen this season, and this loss marked the third loss in the past 4 games.

=== August ===

Beijing Guoan's home match against rival Shanghai Shenhua starting line-up, 4 August 2024

Guoan's August started with a headliner match against rival Shanghai Shenhua on 5th August. With a number of players injured and a number of losses in recent weeks, the game was considered difficult for Guoan. Guoan, however, opened the scoring first in the 11th minute with Ngadeu heading into the net a Guga corner and giving Guoan a 1–0 lead. Shenhua had a number of chances in the first half, but Han Jiaqi scrambled to prevent Guoan from conceding. Shenhua managed to break through Guoan's defense 3 minutes into the second half, but the goal was ruled off by VAR. In the 76th minute, Shenhua's Malele riffled a cross into the roof of the net, drawing Shenhua level at 1–1. In the 98th minute, Zhang Xizhe, recovering from injury as a crucial substitute, slid a pass to Wang Ziming, who dropped a Shenhua defender before scoring and settling the game at 2–1 for Guoan. While Guoan remained 4th after the victory, the game was Guoan's 12th consecutive at home against Shanghai Shenhua, and gave Shenhua their first loss of the season.

On 11 August, Guoan traveled to Qingdao and faced Qingdao West Coast. Li Lei was carded in just 5 minutes, but Lin Liangming drew first blood for Guoan in the 25th after an Abreu through ball cut through West Coast's defensive line. In the 59th minute, former Guoan player A Lan knocked a headed in before Wang Gang could clear the ball, drawing the teams level. A mere four minutes later, West Coast's He Longhai scored a diving header to put Guoan 1–2 behind. Li Ke was introduced in the 73rd minute to freshen up the midfield, but after a bad foul that involved him attempting to choke a West Coast player, he was sent off in the 86th minute. He was later issued an additional 4-match ban along with a ¥40,000 fine for his aggressive foul. Guoan rescued a draw at 2–2 in the end thanks to Wang Ziming following up on a saved Abreu shot in the 96th minute.

Guoan played against Zhejiang on 16 August at home. Wang Ziming, who was rewarded with his first start of the season after scoring decisive goals for consecutive games, missed two one-on-one chances in the first 20 minutes of the game. Guoan produced a number of chances in the first half, but the game stayed at 0–0. In the second half, Zhejiang managed to create better chances. In the 87th minute, Zhang Yuning was sent off after VAR review deemed his contact with Zhejiang player was too heavy. Neither team scored until the final whistle, ending the game in a 0–0 draw. Zhang was issued a 3-match ban after the game for violent conduct. He later posted on his personal social media account stating that he never hit the opposition player in the face and called the additional match ban "difficult to accept."

In the quarter-finals of the Chinese FA Cup, Guoan traveled to Shanghai to play old rivals Shenhua on 22 August. In the 12th minute, Guoan conceded first as João Teixeira's shot from the edge of the box was deflected past Han Jiaqi. Despite a number of good chances in the first half, Guoan failed to level up the score. In the 48th minute, Abreu fell to the ground in the Shenhua box, but a controversial VAR review deemed Abreu to have handled the ball with his hand first, thereby ruling out any potential penalty call to the anger of Guoan coaches and players. In the 91st minunte, Shenhua took advantage of Guoan's desperate attacks and scored another off of a counter via Shinichi Chen. Zhang Yuning pulled a goal back two minutes lated through a Cao Yongjing assist, but it was too late. With the game ending in a 2–1 loss for Guoan, the team was eliminated from this year's FA Cup.

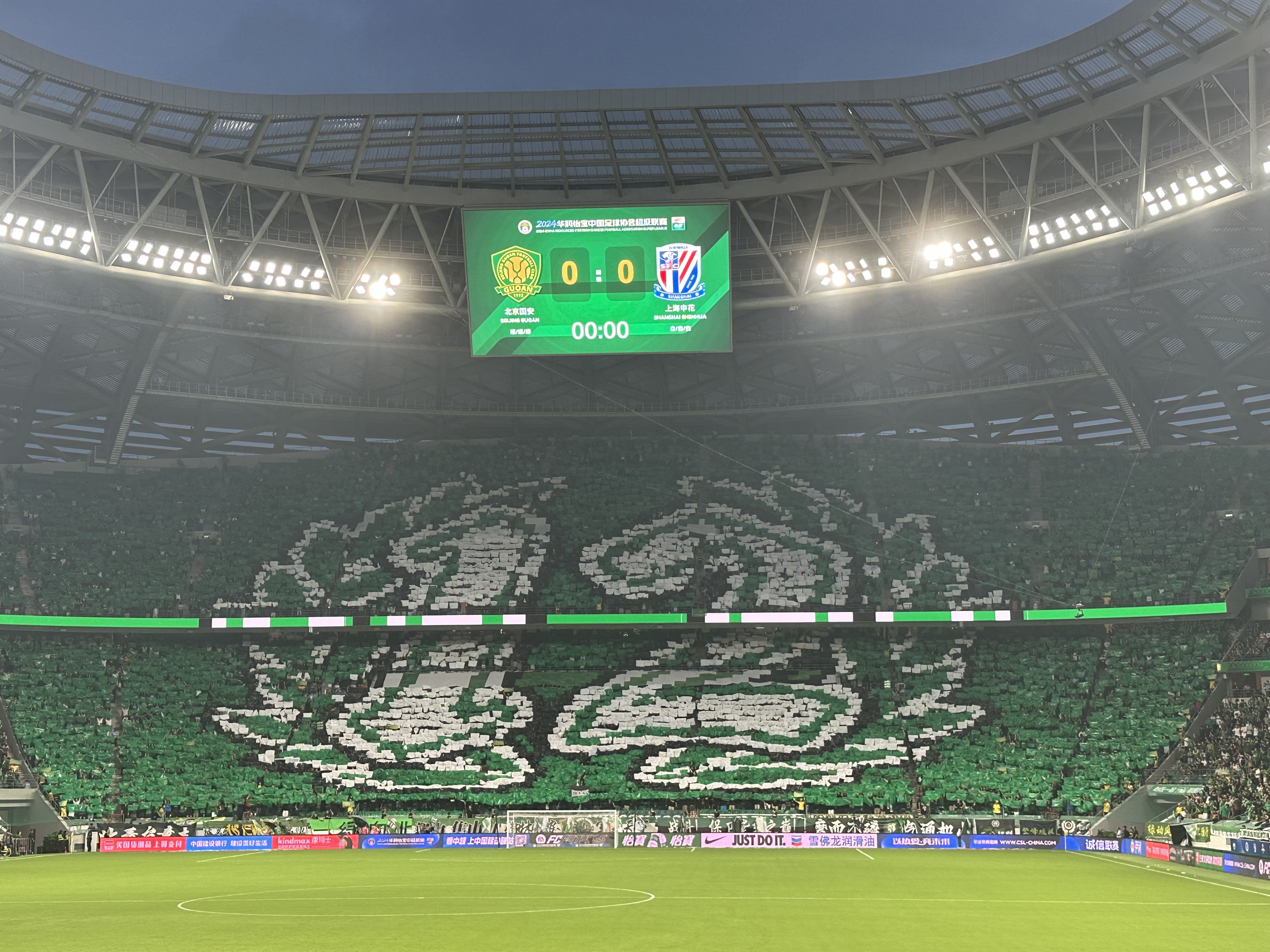
The tifo made by Guoan fans in the Workers' Stadium ahead of the August 4th match against old rivals Shanghai Shenhua

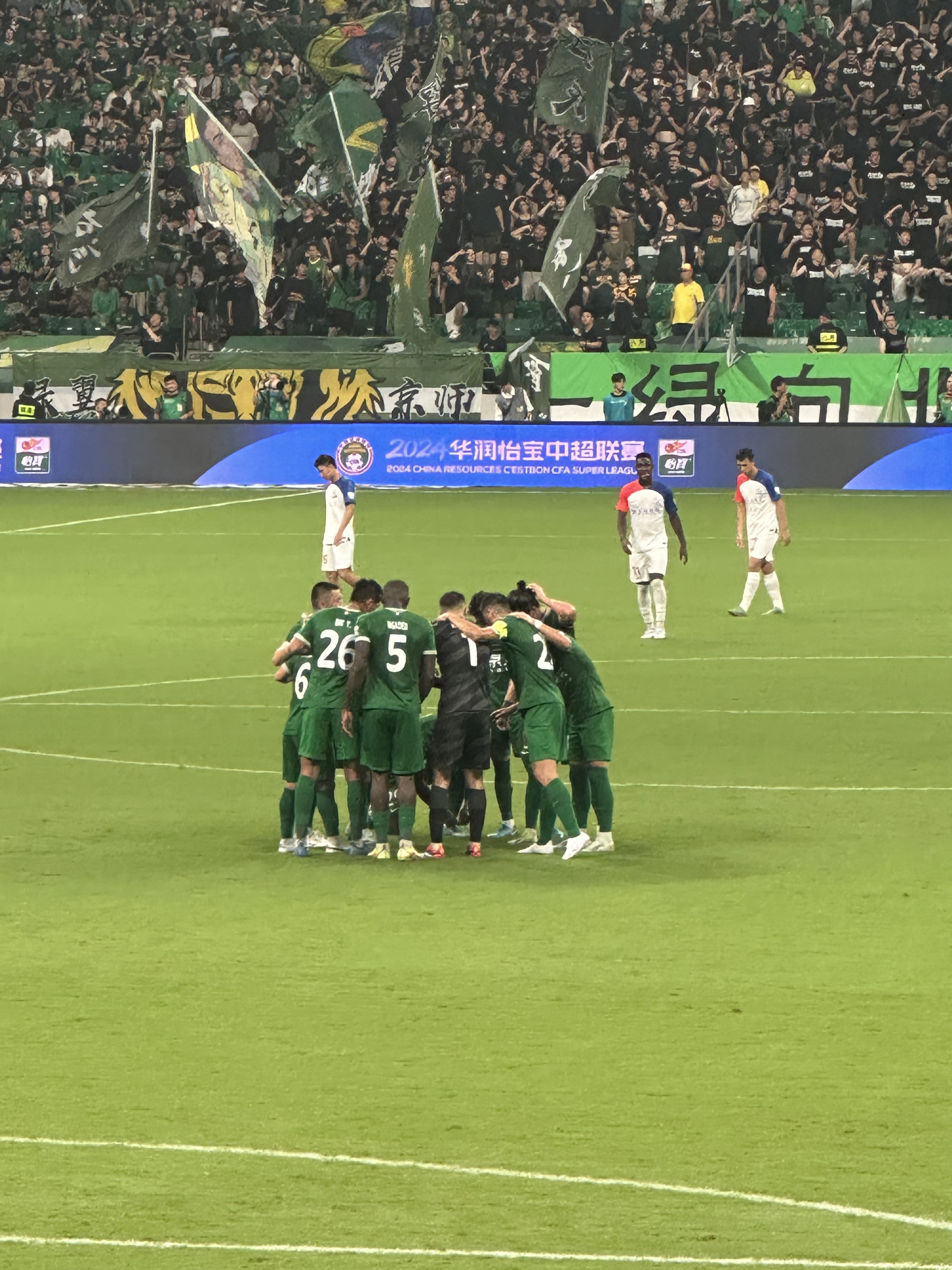
Players gathering in the match against Shanghai Shenhua

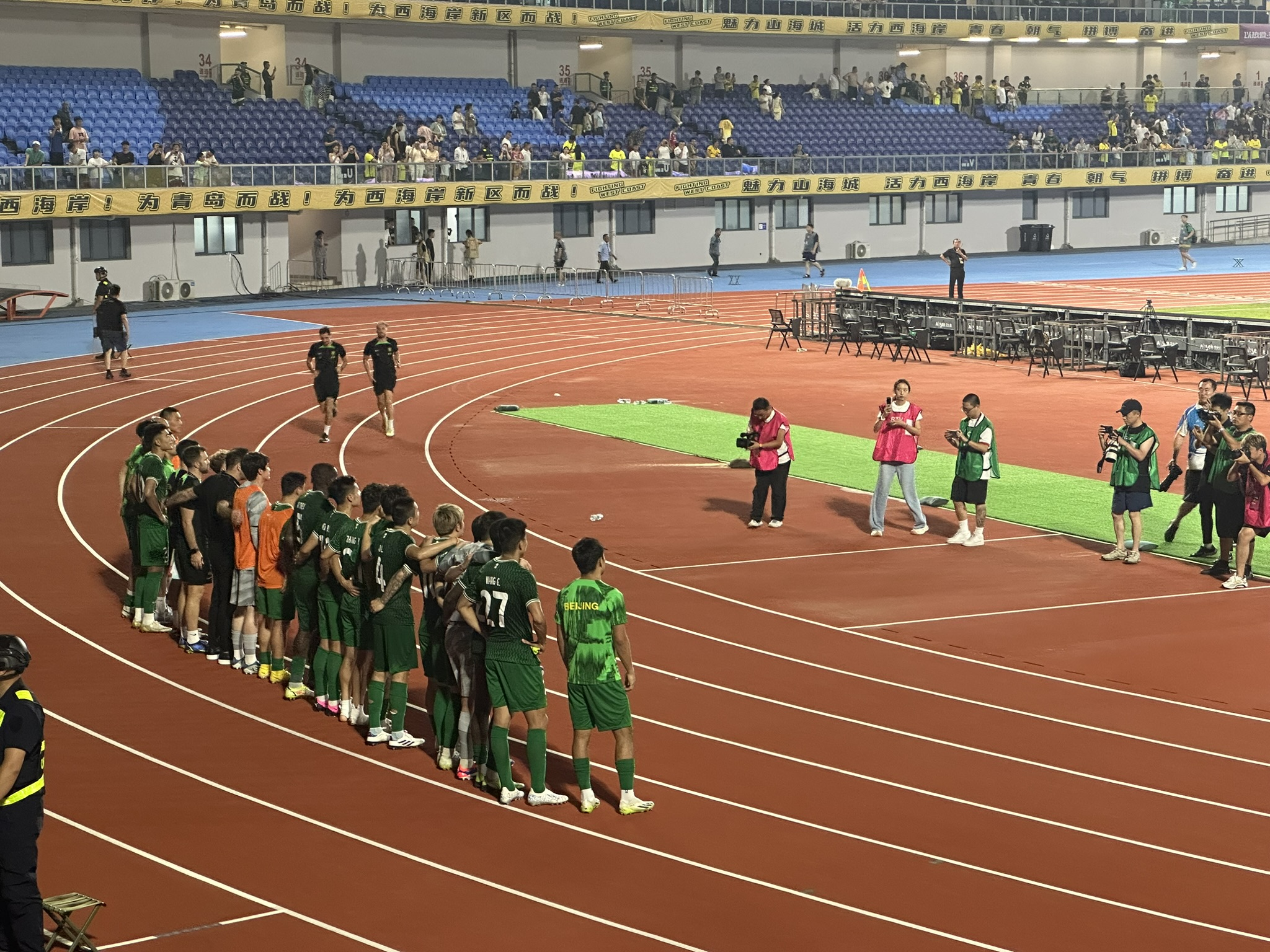
Players after an away draw against Qingdao West Coast

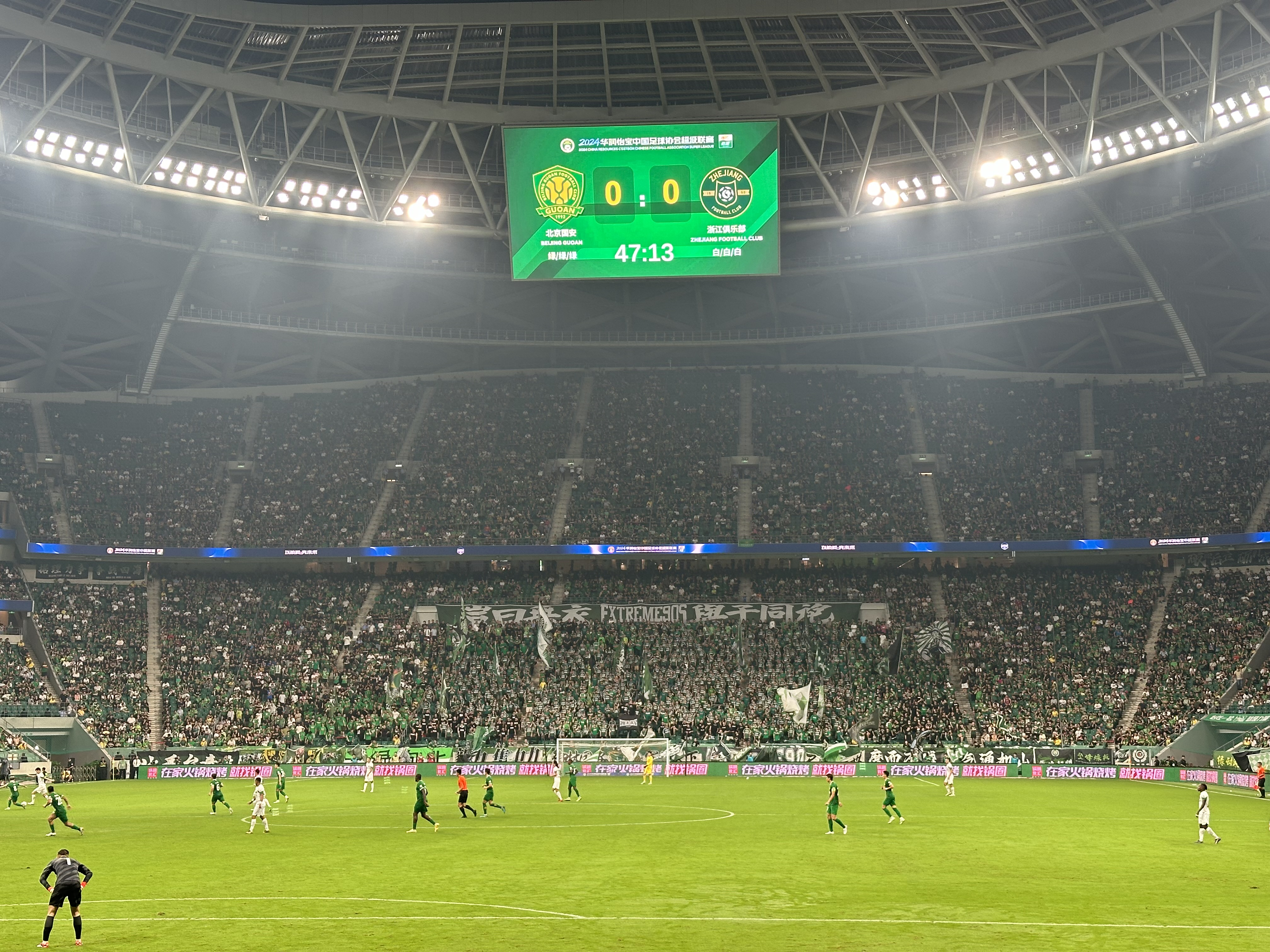
Guoan players in the Workers' Stadium in the August 16th game against Zhejiang

=== September ===
Guoan players returned from international break and traveled to face Chengdu Rongcheng on 14 September. In the 24th minute, Guoan conceded the first goal after Chengdu's Zhou Dingyang set the ball up for Rômulo to finish. A Guoan error in build-up in the 39th minute allowed Yahav Gurfinkel to assist Felipe, giving Chengdu a 2-goal lead. After the half, Guoan's play improved. In the 52nd minute, Cao Yongjing pulled a goal back, scoring a header from a Li Lei corner. In the 69th minute, Zhang Yuan slipped a ball to Lin Liangming on the left, who calmly placed the ball into the net through the keeper's legs, tying the game at 2–2. Neither team made progress afterwards, and the game ended in a 2–2 draw with Guoan holding onto 4th place after the game.

On the 20 September, Guoan traveled to play against Meizhou Hakka. In the 11th minute, Guoan scored first as Li Lei headed in his first goal in 4 years from a Guga corner. In the 61st minute, Meizhou leveled the game through Tyrone Conraad. Soon after, Soares introduced Fang Hao into the game, and his drive led to Guga's goal in the 73rd minute to put Guoan 2–1 up. In the 89th minute, Abreu acted as a target man and set up Yu Dabao, who scored Guoan's third in the game. Guoan ended the game with a 3–1 victory, snapping its three-game draw streak. Yu Dabao's goal also saw him surpass Zhou Ting to become Guoan's oldest scorer at 36 years and 155 days.

Guoan broke records on 28 September with an emphatic win against Changchun Yatai at home. Guoan opened the scoring in the 8th minute with Guga assisting Cao Yongjing. Lin Liangming's goal in the 25th minute, Abreu's penalty in the 33rd and goal in the 41st saw Guoan establish a 4–0 lead before halftime, although Changchun's Robert Berić pulled one back. In the second half, Guoan scored 4 unanswered goals with Abreu completing his hat trick with another penalty in the 51st, Fang Hao in the 72nd, and Wang Ziming in the 88th and 94th minute. The 8–1 victory is Guoan's largest in the Super League era and the team's second largest ever, behind only the 9–1 victory against Shanghai Shenhua. The scoreline also tied Shanghai Port for the largest scoreline and victory in the 2024 Super League season.

=== October ===
Returning from the international break to face Qingdao Hainiu at home on 19 October, Guoan extended its red-hot attacking form. In the 18th minute, Li Lei's log pass allowed Abreu to set up Cao Yongjing's goal. In the 26th minute, Abreu headed in a deflected Lin Liangming cross to double Guoan's lead. In the 48th minute, Abreu's cross from the right allowed Lin Liangming to tap the ball in for a 3–0 lead. In the 60th minute, Abreu's pass from the left allowed Cao Yongjing to double his tally as well. 6 minutes later, Abreu's through-ball set up Lin Liangming on the counter for Guoan's fifth. Hainiu's Liu Jiashen scored an own goal in the 89th and allowed Guoan to secure a 6–0 home victory. The win guaranteed Guoan at least a 4th-place finish in the league. Abreu, with 4 assists in the game, reached double figures for both goals and assists in the season. Youngster Fan Shangjie also made his first team debut for the club, replacing Li Lei in the 77th minute.

Guoan's traveled to face Nantong Zhiyun for its last away game and second to last game of the season on 27 October. Guoan opened the scoring in just 3 minutes into the game with Abreu assisting Lin Liangming in a counter attack. In the 45th minute, Li Lei's corner found the head of Ngadeu, who nudged the ball into the far corner for a 2–0 Guoan lead at halftime. Nantong pulled a goal back in the 49th minute with Issa Kallon blasting a long-ranged shot past Han Jiaqi. In the 69th minute, Lin Liangming returned Abreu's favor and assisted the latter for the third Guoan goal. Zhang Yuning, who returned from his suspension, missed a penalth in the 83rd minute. The game ended with a 3–1 Guoan victory, and with one game left the team secured its 4th place finish in the league. Nantong was relegated after the loss.

=== November ===
The last game of the season took place at home against Henan on 2 November with 46,581 fans in the stadium. In the 24th minute, Guoan put the ball in Henan's net first, but Fang Hao's strike was ruled out after VAR reviewed a prior foul. In the 40th minute, Guga smashed in a rebound goal to give Guoan the lead. However, Henan leveled just 5 minute later via a header. Neither team were able to score in the second half, and the game ended in a 1–1 draw. With 65 goals, the 2024 season is Guoan's highest scoring season ever in the Super League.

Guoan's participation in the 2025–26 AFC Champions League 2 was officially confirmed in February 2025. As a result of finishing 4th in the league in 2024, Guoan would qualify for the competition provided that Shandong Taishan, which finished behind Guoan and could not qualify via its domestic league rankings, does not win the 2024–25 AFC Champions League Elite. On 19 February 2025, Shandong Taishan withdrew from the group stages of the 2024–25 AFC Champions League Elite as a result of sustained political controversy stirred by its fans displaying images of former South Korean dictator Chun Doo-hwan and current leader of North Korea Kim Jong-un in an Champions League away match against K-League side Gwangju FC, cementing Guoan's place in next season's continental competition.

== Players ==
=== First-team squad ===
As of 15 July 2024

Note: Flags indicate national team as defined under FIFA eligibility rules; some limited exceptions apply. Players may hold more than one non-FIFA nationality.

No.	Pos.	Nation	Player
1	GK	CHN	Han Jiaqi
2	DF	MLI	Mamadou Traoré
3	DF	CHN	He Yupeng
4	DF	CHN	Li Lei
5	DF	CMR	Michael Ngadeu-Ngadjui
6	MF	CHN	Chi Zhongguo
8	MF	POR	Guga
9	FW	CHN	Zhang Yuning
10	MF	CHN	Zhang Xizhe
11	FW	CHN	Lin Liangming
16	DF	CHN	Feng Boxuan
17	FW	CHN	Yang Liyu
18	FW	CHN	Fang Hao
19	MF	CHN	Nebijan Muhmet
20	FW	CHN	Wang Ziming
21	MF	CHN	Zhang Yuan

No.	Pos.	Nation	Player
22	MF	CHN	Yu Dabao (captain)
23	MF	CHN	Li Ke (Note: Upon joining Beijing Guoan, the player became a naturalised Chinese citizen)
24	FW	NGR	Samuel Adegbenro
25	GK	PAR	Zheng Tuluo (Note: Player became a naturalised Chinese citizen before joining Beijing Guoan)
26	DF	CHN	Bai Yang
27	DF	CHN	Wang Gang
28	MF	CHN	Zhang Chengdong
29	FW	ANG	Fábio Abreu
30	DF	CHN	Fan Shuangjie
33	GK	CHN	Nureli Abbas
34	GK	CHN	Hou Sen
37	FW	CHN	Cao Yongjing
42	DF	CHN	Yang Haocheng
43	DF	CHN	Hao Yucheng
44	MF	CHN	Wang Zihao
45	GK	CHN	Yao Boqing

==== Out on loan ====
As of 15 July 2024

Note: Flags indicate national team as defined under FIFA eligibility rules; some limited exceptions apply. Players may hold more than one non-FIFA nationality.

No.	Pos.	Nation	Player
—	FW	CHN	Yan Yu (at Heilongjiang Ice City until 31 December 2024)
—	DF	CHN	Liang Shaowen (at Nantong Zhiyun until 31 December 2024)
—	MF	CHN	Duan Dezhi (at Suzhou Dongwu until 31 December 2024)

No.	Pos.	Nation	Player
—	DF	CHN	Jiang Wenhao (at Changchun Yatai until 31 December 2024)
—	DF	CHN	Zhang Yixuan (at Shijiazhuang Gongfu until 31 December 2024)
—	DF	CHN	Ruan Qilong (at Liaoning Tieren until 31 December 2024)

== Transfers ==
=== In ===
#	Pos.	Player	Age	Moving from	Type	Transfer Window	Ends	Fee	Source
	GK	(China) Guo Quanbo	26	(China) Meizhou Hakka	Loan return	Winter		Free	
	MF	(China) Shi Yucheng	22	(China) Suzhou Dongwu	Loan return	Winter		Free	
	DF	(China) Yang Fan	27	(China) Tianjin Jinmen Tiger	Loan return	Winter		Free	
37	FW	(China) Cao Yongjing	26	(China) Changchun Yatai	Loan return	Winter	2025	Free	
24	FW	(Nigeria) Samuel Adegbenro	27	(Norway) Viking	Loan return	Winter	2024	Free	
8	MF	(Portugal) Guga	26	(Portugal) Rio Ave	Transfer	Winter	2025	Undisclosed	
11	FW	(China) Lin Liangming	26	(China) Dalian Pro	Transfer	Winter	2026	Free	
3	DF	(China) He Yupeng	24	(China) Dalian Pro	Transfer	Winter	2027	Free	
2	DF	(Mali) Mamadou Traoré	29	(Qatar) Muaither	Transfer	Winter	2024	Undisclosed	
40	DF	(China) Zhang Yixuan	19	(China) Hubei Istar	Transfer	Winter	2027	Undisclosed	
	FW	(Croatia) Marko Dabro	26	(Latvia) Riga	Loan return	Winter		Free	
	FW	(China) Tian Yuda	22	(China) Changchun Yatai	Loan return	Winter		Free	
25	GK	(Paraguay) Zheng Tuluo	24	(Spain) Racing Rioja	Transfer	Summer	2026	Free	

=== Out ===
#	Pos.	Player	Age	Moving to	Type	Transfer Window	Fee	Source
5	MF	(Brazil) Josef de Souza	34	(Turkey) İstanbul Başakşehir	End of contract	Winter	Free	
8	MF	(China) Piao Cheng	34	Retired	End of contract	Winter	–	
15	MF	(China) Gao Tianyi	25	(China) Shanghai Shenhua	End of contract	Winter	Free	
	DF	(China) Yang Fan	27	(China) Chengdu Rongcheng	End of contract	Winter	Free	
	FW	(Croatia) Marko Dabro	26	(Croatia) Varaždin	Contract terminated	Winter	Free	
	GK	(China) Guo Quanbo	26	(China) Meizhou Hakka	End of contract	Winter	Free	
	FW	(China) Tian Yuda	22	(China) Changchun Yatai	End of contract	Winter	Free	
14	GK	(China) Zou Dehai	30	(China) Changchun Yatai	End of contract	Winter	Free	
	MF	(China) Shi Yucheng	22	(China) Shenzhen Juniors	Loan	Winter	Free	
39	FW	(China) Yan Yu	21	(China) Heilongjiang Ice City	Loan	Winter	Free	
44	FW	(China) Duan Dezhi	22	(China) Suzhou Dongwu	Loan	Winter	Free	
7	MF	(South Korea) Kang Sang-Woo	30	(South Korea) FC Seoul	Contract terminated	Winter	Free	
36	DF	(China) Liang Shaowen	21	(China) Nantong Zhiyun	Loan	Summer	Free	
35	DF	(China) Jiang Wenhao	23	(China) Changchun Yatai	Loan	Summer	Free	
40	DF	(China) Zhang Yixuan	19	(China) Shijiazhuang Gongfu	Loan	Summer	Free	
38	DF	(China) Ruan Qilong	22	(China) Liaoning Tieren	Loan	Summer	Free	

== Friendlies ==
18 January 2024 Friendly	Portimonense U23 (Portugal)	1–5	Beijing Guoan	Albufeira, Portugal

24 January 2024 Friendly	Louletano (Portugal)	1–3	Beijing Guoan	Albufeira, Portugal
			21' Abreu; 74' Zhang Xizhe; 84' Wang Ziming

27 January 2024 Friendly	Slavia Prague (Czech Republic)	3–1	Beijing Guoan	Albufeira, Portugal
	Douděra 60'; Ewerton 69'; Jurečka 90' (pen.)	Report	2' Abreu	Stadium: Pine Cliffs Resort

27 January 2024 Friendly	Beijing Guoan	0–0	(Czech Republic) Slavia Prague	Albufeira, Portugal
		Report		Stadium: Pine Cliffs Resort

31 January 2024 Friendly	Moncarapachense (Portugal)	0–2	Beijing Guoan	Albufeira, Portugal
			Yu Dabao	Stadium: Pine Cliffs Resort

31 January 2024 The Atlantic Cup	KÍ (Faroe Islands)	0–1	Beijing Guoan	Albufeira, Portugal
		Report	5' Abreu	Stadium: Pine Cliffs Resort

6 February 2024 Friendly	Louletano (Portugal)	0–1	Beijing Guoan	Albufeira, Portugal
			He Yupeng

6 February 2024 Friendly	Farense (Portugal)	0–2	Beijing Guoan	Albufeira, Portugal

19 February 2024 Friendly	Beijing Guoan	1–0	(China) Yunnan Yukun	Guangzhou, China
	Wang Ziming			Stadium: Guangzhou Higher Education Mega Center Central Stadium

24 February 2024 Friendly	Beijing Guoan	2–0	(China) Guangxi Pingguo Haliao	Guangzhou, China
	Guga; Lin Liangming			Stadium: Guangzhou Higher Education Mega Center Central Stadium

24 February 2024 Friendly	Beijing Guoan	2–3	(China) Liaoning Tieren	Guangzhou, China
	Yang Liyu; Samuel Adegbenro		Shang Yin; Chen Long; Song Chen	Stadium: Guangzhou Higher Education Mega Center Central Stadium

17 March 2024 Friendly	Beijing Guoan	6–1	(China) Cangzhou Mighty Lions	Beijing, China
	Abreu (pen.); Cao Yongjing; Nebijan Muhmet

23 March 2024 Friendly	Beijing Guoan	2–1	(China) Qingdao Hainiu	Beijing, China
	Zhang Xizhe; Fang Hao		Boakye

8 June 2024 Friendly	Beijing Guoan	3–1	(China) Qingdao Hainiu	Beijing, China
	Zhang Chengdong 30'; Abreu 37'; Yu Dabao 71'		Boakye

7 September 2024 Friendly	Beijing Guoan	2–2	(China) Henan	Beijing, China
	Cao Yongjing; Zhang Yuan		(o.g.); Niu Ziyi

== Competitions ==
=== Overview ===
Competition	First match	Last match	Starting round	Final position	Record							
Competition	First match	Last match	Starting round	Final position	Pld	W	D	L	GF	GA	GD	Win %
Chinese Super League	2 March	2 November	Matchday 1	4th	30	16	8	6	65	35	+30	53.33
Chinese FA Cup	22 June	22 August	Fourth round	Quarter-finals	3	2	0	1	8	3	+5	66.67
Total					33	18	8	7	73	38	+35	54.55

Source: Soccerway

=== Chinese Super League ===
==== Results summary ====
Overall								Home						Away					
Pld	W	D	L	GF	GA	GD	Pts	W	D	L	GF	GA	GD	W	D	L	GF	GA	GD
30	16	8	6	65	35	+30	56	10	3	2	43	15	+28	6	5	4	22	20	+2

Source: ESPN

==== Results by round ====
Round	1	2	3	4	5	6	7	8	9	10	11	12	13	14	15	16	17	18	19	20	21	22	23	24	25	26	27	28	29	30
Ground	A	A	A	H	H	A	H	A	A	H	H	A	A	H	A	H	H	H	A	A	H	A	H	H	A	A	H	H	A	H
Result	W	D	W	D	L	D	W	W	W	W	W	L	D	W	L	W	W	L	L	W	L	W	D	D	D	W	W	W	W	D
Position	5	5	4	4	6	6	5	4	4	3	3	4	4	4	5	4	4	4	4	4	4	4	4	4	4	4	4	4	4	4

Source: Competitive matches
A = Away; H = Home; W = Win; D = Draw; L = Loss

==== League table ====
Pos	Team	Pld	W	D	L	GF	GA	GD	Pts	Qualification or relegation
2	Shanghai Shenhua	30	24	5	1	73	20	+53	77	Qualification for AFC Champions League Elite league stage
3	Chengdu Rongcheng	30	18	5	7	65	31	+34	59	Qualification for AFC Champions League Elite play-off round
4	Beijing Guoan	30	16	8	6	65	35	+30	56	Qualification for AFC Champions League Two group stage
5	Shandong Taishan	30	13	9	8	49	40	+9	48	
6	Tianjin Jinmen Tiger	30	12	6	12	44	47	−3	42	

Source: Soccerway
Rules for classification:
- During season: 1) Points; 2) Head-to-head points; 3) Head-to-head goal difference; 4) Head-to-head goals scored; 5) Goal difference; 6) Goals scored; 7) Rankings in the previous season. (Rules 2 to 4 are only applied when teams concerned have finished both/all the matches against others.)
- After season: 1) Points; 2) Head-to-head points; 3) Head-to-head goal difference; 4) Head-to-head goals scored; 5) Goal difference; 6) Goals scored; 7) Disciplinary points (yellow card = 1 point, red card = 3 points); 8) Drawing of lots.

==== Matches ====
2 March 2024 1	Cangzhou Mighty Lions	0–2	Beijing Guoan	Cangzhou
15:30 UTC+8	Li Hong (yellow card) 45+6'; Maritu (yellow card) 89'	Report	Zhang Yuning 14'; Yang Liyu 90+6' (pen.)	Stadium: Cangzhou Stadium; Attendance: 11,518; Referee: Wang Jing; Assistant referees: Luo Zheng; Wang Xihong; Fourth official: He Kai

9 March 2024 2	Shandong Taishan	0–0	Beijing Guoan	Jinan
19:35 UTC+8	Jia Feifan (yellow card) 46'; Peng Xinli (yellow card) 49'; Jadson (yellow card) 88'	Report	Adegbenro (yellow card) 90+8'	Stadium: Jinan Olympic Sports Center Stadium; Attendance: 48,397; Referee: Ma Ning; Assistant referees: Shi Xiang; Su Xiaofei; Fourth official: Gao Peng

30 March 2024 3	Wuhan Three Towns	0–1	Beijing Guoan	Wuhan
15:30 UTC+8	Luo Senwen (yellow card) 78'	Report	Li Ke (yellow card) 30'; Abreu (yellow card) 52', (goal) 74'; He Yupeng (yellow card) 77'	Stadium: Wuhan Sports Center; Attendance: 18,071; Referee: Dai Yige; Assistant referees: Wu Mingfeng; Tang Rongdi; Fourth official: Sun Lei

5 April 2024 4	Beijing Guoan	2–2	Shanghai Port	Beijing
19:35 UTC+8	Guga 27', (yellow card) 45+3'; Zhang Yuning 82' (pen.); Hou Sen (yellow card) 90'; Zhang Yuan (yellow card) 90+2'	Report	Wu Lei 10', 90+6'; Wang Shenchao (yellow card) 72'; Li Shuai (yellow card) 76'	Stadium: Workers' Stadium; Attendance: 53,898; Referee: Memetjan Ahmat; Assistant referees: Cao Yi; Ma Ji; Fourth official: Ren Tong

9 April 2024 5	Beijing Guoan	1–2	Shenzhen Peng City	Beijing
19:35 UTC+8	Fang Hao (yellow card) 31'; Ngadeu-Ngadjui (yellow card) 82'; Zhang Xizhe 90+6' (pen.)	Report	Li Zhi 24', (yellow card) 51'; Zhang Yudong (yellow card) 29'; Zhu Baojie (yellow card) 45+8'; García 56' (pen.); Wang Qiao (yellow card) 87'	Stadium: Workers' Stadium; Attendance: 46,348; Referee: Huang Yi; Assistant referees: Zhang Meilin; Wang Zuo; Fourth official: Wan Tao

13 April 2024 6	Shanghai Shenhua	1–1	Beijing Guoan	Shanghai
19:35 UTC+8	André Luis 25'; Jiang Shenglong (yellow card) 50'	Report	Zhang Yuning 5'; Fang Hao (yellow card) 38'; Traoré (yellow card) 54'; He Yupeng (yellow card) 71' (yellow-red card) 81'; Hou Sen (yellow card) 90+6'	Stadium: Shanghai Stadium; Attendance: 31,941; Referee: Li Haixin; Assistant referees: Liu Xing; Tang Rongdi; Fourth official: Jia Zhiliang

21 April 2024 7	Beijing Guoan	4–1	Qingdao West Coast	Beijing
20:00 UTC+8	Ngadeu-Ngadjui 6'; Li Ke 63'; Wang Ziming 75'; Adegbenro 90+6'	Report	Haroyan (red card) 53'; Chen Xiangyu 90'	Stadium: Workers' Stadium; Attendance: 50,231; Referee: Wang Di; Assistant referees: Zhou Fei; Zhang Zhe; Fourth official: Ren Tong

26 April 2024 8	Zhejiang	1–2	Beijing Guoan	Hangzhou
19:35 UTC+8	Leonardo 90+6'	Report	He Yupeng (yellow card) 40'; Guga (yellow card) 43'; Zhang Yuning 45+3'; Cao Yongjing 52'; Zhang Xizhe (yellow card) 87'; Ngadeu-Ngadjui (yellow card) 90+4'; Traoré (yellow card) 90+10'	Stadium: Huanglong Sports Center Stadium; Attendance: 22,337; Referee: Dai Yige; Assistant referees: Wu Mingfeng; Zhang Meilin; Fourth official: Liang Caiwei

30 April 2024 9	Tianjin Jinmen Tiger	0–1	Beijing Guoan	Tianjin
19:35 UTC+8	Wang Zhenghao (yellow card) 30'; Škorić (yellow card) 61'; Ming Tian (yellow card) 61'	Report	Zhang Yuan (red card) 19'; Cao Yongjing 52'; Wang Ziming (yellow card) 90+6'	Stadium: TEDA Soccer Stadium; Attendance: 28,550; Referee: Wang Jing; Assistant referees: Shi Xiang; Guan Changliang; Fourth official: Sun Lei

5 May 2024 10	Beijing Guoan	2–1	Chengdu Rongcheng	Beijing
19:35 UTC+8	Guga 12', (yellow card) 83'; Li Ke (yellow card) 21'; Abreu 45+1'	Report	Tang Chuang (yellow card) 38'; Hu Ruibao (yellow card) 45+4'; Rômulo 52'; Chow (yellow card) 60'	Stadium: Workers' Stadium; Attendance: 52,215; Referee: Memetjan Ahmat; Assistant referees: Zhang Cheng; Guo Jingtao; Fourth official: Ren Tong

11 May 2024 11	Beijing Guoan	3–2	Meizhou Hakka	Beijing
20:00 UTC+8	Zhang Yuan (yellow card) 67'; Lin Liangming 76'; Yu Dabao 82'; Fang Hao 84', (yellow card) 85'	Report	Ye Chugui 19'; Wang Jianan 45+1'; Shi Liang (yellow card) 69'; Pan Ximing (red card) 74'; Tian Ziyi (yellow card) 90'	Stadium: Workers' Stadium; Attendance: 48,132; Referee: Jin Jingyuan; Assistant referees: Wu Mingfeng; Lü Pin; Fourth official: Shan Dan'ao

17 May 2024 12	Changchun Yatai	3–2	Beijing Guoan	Changchun
20:00 UTC+8	Serginho 4'; Guilherme 67', (yellow card) 74'; Wang Yu (yellow card) 90+3'; Žulj 90+9' (pen.)	Report	Abreu 30', 90+3'; Lin Liangming (yellow card) 76'; Li Ke (yellow card) 80'	Stadium: Changchun Stadium; Attendance: 18,295; Referee: Wang Jing; Assistant referees: Zhou Fei; Zu Shanfa; Fourth official: Ma Yunkun

21 May 2024 13	Qingdao Hainiu	1–1	Beijing Guoan	Qingdao
19:35 UTC+8	Liu Jiashen (yellow card) 38'; Lopes (yellow card) 48'; Boakye (yellow card) 70', (goal) 72'	Report	Yu Dabao (yellow card) 20' (yellow-red card) 45+1'; Cao Yongjing 54'; Li Ke (yellow card) 83'; Ngadeu-Ngadjui (yellow card) 90+4'	Stadium: Qingdao Youth Football Stadium; Attendance: 0 (Note: The match was played behind closed doors following Chinese FA's closure of the Qingdao Hainiu stadium for two matches due to the club's disciplinary violations); Referee: Tang Shunqi; Assistant referees: Su Xiaofei; Jin Jun; Fourth official: Cui Yong

26 May 2024 14	Beijing Guoan	5–2	Nantong Zhiyun	Beijing
19:00 UTC+8	Abreu 5', 88'; He Yupeng 8'; Ngadeu-Ngadjui (yellow card) 30'; Cao Yongjing 63'; Fang Hao 90+1'	Report	Jiang Zilei (yellow card) 16'; Zheng Haoqian 23'; Nzuzi Mata (yellow card) 65'; Puclin 73'	Stadium: Workers' Stadium; Attendance: 43,113; Referee: Zhang Yangfan; Assistant referees: Sun Kai; Deng Bo; Fourth official: Yu Bo

15 June 2024 15	Henan	2–1	Beijing Guoan	Zhengzhou
20:00 UTC+8	Bruno Nazário 52'; Denić (yellow card) 68'; Li Songyi (yellow card) 90'; Čović 90+1'		Lin Liangming 35'; Traoré (yellow card) 40'; Feng Boxuan (yellow card) 45'	Stadium: Hanghai Stadium; Attendance: 19,628; Referee: Gan Shuran; Assistant referees: Luo Zheng; Wang Xihong; Fourth official: Sun Shengyu

26 June 2024 16	Beijing Guoan	4–0	Cangzhou Mighty Lions	Beijing
20:00 UTC+8	Adegbenro 17'; Abreu 32'; Li Lei (yellow card) 48'; Yang Liyu 84'; Wang Ziming 90+6' (pen.)		Zheng Kaimu (yellow card) 90+5'	Stadium: Workers' Stadium; Attendance: 35,343; Referee: Zhen Wei; Assistant referees: Hu Chengjun; Zhang Haijun; Fourth official: Liang Songshang

30 June 2024 17	Beijing Guoan	2–0	Shandong Taishan	Beijing
20:00 UTC+8	Adebgenro 4'; Abreu 5'; Li Lei (yellow card) 50'; Wang Gang (yellow card) 77'; Yang Liyu (yellow card) 90+1'		Liao Lisheng (yellow card) 30'	Stadium: Workers' Stadium; Attendance: 54,189; Referee: Xing Qi; Assistant referees: Liu Xing; Xi Fei; Fourth official: Shan Dan'ao

7 July 2024 18	Beijing Guoan	1–2	Wuhan Three Towns	Beijing
19:35 UTC+8	Li Ke (yellow card) 54'; Wang Gang (yellow card) 57'; Traoré (red card) 63'; Abreu 90+4'; Ngadeu (yellow card) 90+7'		Deng Hanwen (red card) 33'; Pedro Henrique 40'; Afrden Asqer (yellow card) 45+3'; Darlan (yellow card) 45+7'; Liu Yue 82'; Liu Dianzuo (yellow card) 90+4'; Ren Hang (yellow card) 90+7'	Stadium: Workers' Stadium; Attendance: 45,569; Referee: Li Xinhai; Assistant referees: Wu Mingfeng; Chen Chao; Fourth official: Ma Yunkun

12 July 2024 19	Shanghai Port	5–1	Beijing Guoan	Shanghai
19:35 UTC+8	Wu Lei 16', 71'; Gustavo 30', 33'; Oscar 58'; Jiang Guangtai (yellow card) 60'		Lin Liangming 13'; He Yupeng (yellow card) 55'	Stadium: Pudong Football Stadium; Attendance: 22,897; Referee: Tang Shunqi; Assistant referees: Cao Yi; Kong Lingda; Fourth official: Zhang Yangfan

21 July 2024 24	Beijing Guoan	2–0	Tianjin Jinmen Tiger	Beijing
19:35 UTC+8	Li Ke (yellow card) 45+2'; Guga 67'; Zhang Yuan 90+8'			Stadium: Workers' Stadium; Attendance: 45,771; Referee: Wang Di; Assistant referees: Deng Bo; Jiao Wei; Fourth official: Sun Lei

26 July 2024 20	Shenzhen Peng City	1–0	Beijing Guoan	Shenzhen
20:00 UTC+8	Song Yue (yellow card) 27'; García 79' (pen.); Li Zhi (yellow card) 90+4'		Han Jiaqi (yellow card) 77'; Yang Liyu (yellow card) 82'; Abreu (yellow card) 90+4'	Stadium: Bao'an Stadium; Attendance: 6,921; Referee: Xing Qi; Assistant referees: Guo Jingtao; Xi Fei; Fourth official: Ma Yunkun

4 August 2024 21	Beijing Guoan	2–1	Shanghai Shenhua	Beijing
19:35 UTC+8	Ngadeu 11'; Chi Zhongguo (yellow card) 45+3'; Abreu (yellow card) 57'; Li Lei (yellow card) 79'; He Yupeng (yellow card) 85'; Wang Ziming 90+7', (yellow card) 90+9'		Malele 76'	Stadium: Workers' Stadium; Attendance: 50,583; Referee: Jin Jingyuan; Assistant referees: Ma Ji; Hu Chengjun; Fourth official: Shan Dan’ao

11 August 2024 22	Qingdao West Coast	2–2	Beijing Guoan	Qingdao
19:35 UTC+8	A Lan 59'; He Longhai 63'; Zhao Honglüe (yellow card) 86'; Beauguel (yellow card) 88'; *da Luz (yellow card) 90+9'		Li Lei (yellow card) 5'; Lin Liangming 25'; Li Ke (red card) 86'; Wang Ziming 90+6'	Stadium: Qingdao West Coast University City Sports Center; Attendance: 7,892; Referee: Gan Shuran; Assistant referees: Deng Bo; Li Yingbin; Fourth official: Jia Zhiliang

16 August 2024 23	Beijing Guoan	0–0	Zhejiang	Beijing
20:00 UTC+8	Zhang Yuning (red card) 88'			Stadium: Workers' Stadium; Attendance: 40,270; Referee: Zhen Wei; Assistant referees: Luo Zheng; Yang Nan; Fourth official: Zhang Chao

14 September 2024 25	Chengdu Rongcheng	2–2	Beijing Guoan	Chengdu
19:35 UTC+8	Rômulo 24'; Zhou Dingyang (yellow card) 35'; Dong Yanfeng (yellow card) 38'; Felipe 40'		Cao Yongjing (yellow card) 16', (goal) 52'; Wang Gang (yellow card) 43'; Lin Liangming 69'; Yang Liyu (yellow card) 90+3'	Stadium: Phoenix Hill Football Stadium; Attendance: 40,083; Referee: Shen Yinhao; Assistant referees: Ma Ji; Zhang Zhe; Fourth official: Shan Dan'ao

20 September 2024 26	Meizhou Hakka	1–3	Beijing Guoan	Wuhua
19:35 UTC+8	Wei Zhiwei (yellow card) 58'; Conraad 61'		Li Lei 11'; Lin Liangming (yellow card) 48'; Guga 73'; Yu Dabao (yellow card) 86', (goal) 89'; Ngadeu (yellow card) 87'	Stadium: Huitang Stadium; Attendance: 8,236; Referee: Huang Yi; Assistant referees: Zhang Haijun; Guan Changliang; Fourth official: Cui Yong

28 September 2024 27	Beijing Guoan	8–1	Changchun Yatai	Beijing
19:35 UTC+8	Cao Yongjing 8'; Lin Liangming 25'; Abreu 33' (pen.), 41', 51' (pen.); Fang Hao 72'; Wang Ziming 88', 80+4'		Rosić (yellow card) 13'; Yuan Mincheng (yellow card) 17'; Berić 44'; Abduhamit Abdugheni (yellow card) 71'	Stadium: Workers' Stadium; Attendance: 42,804; Referee: Tang Shunqi; Assistant referees: Xi Fei; Kong Lingda; Fourth official: Yu Bo

19 October 2024 28	Beijing Guoan	6–0	Qingdao Hainiu	Beijing
19:35 UTC+8	Cao Yongjing 18', 60'; Abreu 26'; Lin Liangming 47', 66'; Liu Jiashen 89' (o.g.); Yang Liyu (yellow card) 90+3'			Stadium: Workers' Stadium; Attendance: 41,612; Referee: Wang Jing; Assistant referees: Hu Chengjun; Alimjan Abdukadir; Fourth official: Ma Yunkun

27 October 2024 29	Nantong Zhiyun	1–3	Beijing Guoan	Rugao
15:30 UTC+8	Puclin (yellow card) 14'; Kallon 49'; Rosa (yellow card) 89'		Lin Liangming 4'; Ngadeu 45'; Zhang Yuan (yellow card) 51'; Abreu 69'	Stadium: Rugao Olympic Sports Center; Attendance: 13,569; Referee: Muhammad Taqi (Singapore); Assistant referees: Zhang Cheng; Liu Zongqi; Fourth official: Zhang Yangfan

2 November 2024 30	Beijing Guoan	1–1	Henan	Beijing
15:30 UTC+8	Fang Hao (yellow card) 33'; Guga 41'; Abreu (yellow card) 90+3'		Maidana 45+1', (yellow card) 85'; Huang Ruifeng (yellow card) 90'; Gu Cao (yellow card) 90+4'	Stadium: Workers' Stadium; Attendance: 46,581; Referee: Xing Qi; Assistant referees: Deng Bo; Wang Xihong; Fourth official: Sun Shengyu

=== Chinese FA Cup ===
Guoan joined the competition in the fourth round on 22 June. All rounds are single-elimination games. Guoan was eliminated on 22 August in the quarter-finals following an away loss to Shanghai Shenhua.

22 June 2024 Fourth round	Suzhou Dongwu	0–4	Beijing Guoan	Suzhou
19:30 UTC+8	Xiang Rongjun (red card) 21'		Zhang Xizhe 22'; Lin Liangming 35'; Yu Dabao 76'; Wang Ziming 81'	Stadium: Suzhou Olympic Sports Centre; Attendance: 12,633; Referee: Gu Chunhan; Assistant referees: Chen Chao; Lü Pin; Fourth official: Wang Haidong; Man of the Match: Zhang Xizhe

17 July 2024 Fifth round	Wuxi Wugo	1–3	Beijing Guoan	Jiangyin
19:30 UTC+8	Zhu Haiwei 71'		Yang Liyu 11'; Cao Yongjing (yellow card) 20'; Abreu 86'; Zhang Yuning 90'	Stadium: Jiangyin Sports Centre; Attendance: 3,868; Referee: Shan Dan'ao; Assistant referees: Hu Chengjun; Li Yingbin; Fourth official: Gu Chunhan

22 August 2024 Quarter-finals	Shanghai Shenhua	2–1	Beijing Guoan	Shanghai
19:30 UTC+8	Teixeira 11', (yellow card) 23'; Shinichi Chan 90+1'; Wang Haijian (yellow card) 90+11'		Chi Zhongguo (yellow card) 55'; Zhang Yuning 90+3'; Cao Yongjing (yellow card) 90+5'; Abreu (yellow card) 90+7'; Wang Gang (yellow card) 90+10'	Stadium: Shanghai Stadium; Attendance: 31,022; Referee: Memetjan Ahmat; Assistant referees: Ma Ji; Luo Zheng; Fourth official: Shan Dan'ao

== Statistics ==
=== Appearances and goals ===
No.	Pos.	Nat.	Name	Chinese Super League		Chinese FA Cup		Total	
No.	Pos.	Nat.	Name	Apps	Goals	Apps	Goals	Apps	Goals
1	GK	(China)	Han Jiaqi	15	0	3	0	18	0
2	DF	(Mali)	Mamadou Traoré	24(1)	0	2	0	26(1)	0
3	DF	(China)	He Yupeng	13(6)	1	1	0	14(6)	1
4	DF	(China)	Li Lei	24(1)	1	3	0	27(1)	1
5	DF	(Cameroon)	Michael Ngadeu-Ngadjui	28	3	2	0	30	3
6	MF	(China)	Chi Zhongguo	14(4)	0	3	0	17(4)	0
8	MF	(Portugal)	Guga	28(1)	5	1	0	29(1)	5
9	FW	(China)	Zhang Yuning	12(5)	4	0(2)	2	12(7)	6
10	MF	(China)	Zhang Xizhe	12(7)	1	1(1)	1	13(8)	2
11	FW	(China)	Lin Liangming	23(3)	9	3	1	26(3)	10
16	DF	(China)	Feng Boxuan	4(11)	0	0(2)	0	4(13)	0
17	FW	(China)	Yang Liyu	3(19)	2	1	1	4(19)	3
18	FW	(China)	Fang Hao	8(13)	3	0(2)	0	8(15)	3
19	MF	(China)	Nebijan Muhmet	0(4)	0	0(1)	0	0(5)	0
20	FW	(China)	Wang Ziming	1(17)	6	2(1)	1	3(18)	7
21	MF	(China)	Zhang Yuan	12(9)	1	2	0	14(9)	1
22	MF	(China)	Yu Dabao	3(11)	2	0(2)	1	3(13)	3
23	MF	(China)	Li Ke	18(5)	1	1	0	19(5)	1
24	FW	(Nigeria)	Samuel Adegbenro	6(9)	3	1(2)	0	7(11)	3
25	GK	(Paraguay)	Zheng Tuluo	0	0	0	0	0	0
26	DF	(China)	Bai Yang	6(5)	0	1	0	7(5)	0
27	DF	(China)	Wang Gang	17(1)	0	2	0	19(1)	0
28	DF	(China)	Zhang Chengdong	6(5)	0	1	0	7(5)	0
29	FW	(Angola)	Fábio Abreu	26(1)	14	2(1)	1	28(2)	15
30	DF	(China)	Fan Shuangjie	0(1)	0	0	0	0(1)	0
33	GK	(China)	Nureli Abbas	0	0	0	0	0	0
34	GK	(China)	Hou Sen	15	0	0	0	15	0
35	DF	(China)	Jiang Wenhao (Note: Player left the club on loan during the season)	2(1)	0	0	0	2(1)	0
36	DF	(China)	Liang Shaowen	0	0	0	0	0	0
37	FW	(China)	Cao Yongjing	10(5)	8	1(1)	0	11(6)	8
38	DF	(China)	Ruan Qilong	0	0	0	0	0	0
40	DF	(China)	Zhang Yixuan	0	0	0	0	0	0
41	MF	(China)	Li Yixuan (Note: Player was deregistered from the club's first team during the summer window)	0	0	0	0	0	0
42	DF	(China)	Yang Haocheng	0	0	0	0	0	0
43	DF	(China)	Hao Yucheng	0	0	0	0	0	0
44	MF	(China)	Wang Zihao	0	0	0	0	0	0
45	GK	(China)	Yao Boqing	0	0	0	0	0	0

=== Goals ===
Rank	Position	Name	Chinese Super League	Chinese FA Cup	Total
1	FW	(Angola) Fábio Abreu	14	1	15
2	FW	(China) Lin Liangming	9	1	10
3	FW	(China) Cao Yongjing	8	0	8
4	FW	(China) Wang Ziming	6	1	7
5	FW	(China) Zhang Yuning	4	2	6
6	MF	(Portugal) Guga	5	0	5
7	FW	(Nigeria) Samuel Adegbenro	3	0	3
7	FW	(China) Yang Liyu	2	1	3
7	MF	(China) Yu Dabao	2	1	3
7	FW	(China) Fang Hao	3	0	3
7	DF	(Cameroon) Michael Ngadeu-Ngadejui	3	0	3
12	MF	(China) Zhang Xizhe	1	1	2
13	MF	(China) Li Ke	1	0	1
13	DF	(China) He Yupeng	1	0	1
13	MF	(China) Zhang Yuan	1	0	1
13	DF	(China) Li Lei	1	0	1
13	Own goal by opposition		1	0	1
Total			65	8	73

=== Assists ===
Rank	Position	Name	Chinese Super League	Chinese FA Cup	Total
1	FW	(Angola) Fábio Abreu	12	0	12
2	MF	(China) Zhang Xizhe	6	0	6
2	DF	(China) Li Lei	4	2	6
4	FW	(Nigeria) Samuel Adegbenro	4	0	4
5	FW	(China) Cao Yongjing	1	2	3
5	MF	(Portugal) Guga	3	0	3
5	FW	(China) Lin Liangming	3	0	3
8	FW	(China) Fang Hao	1	1	2
8	MF	(China) Li Ke	2	0	2
8	MF	(China) Zhang Yuan	2	0	2
8	FW	(China) Yang Liyu	2	0	2
12	DF	(China) Wang Gang	1	0	1
12	DF	(China) Bai Yang	1	0	1
12	FW	(China) Zhang Yuning	1	0	1
12	DF	(Mali) Mamadou Traoré	1	0	1
12	DF	(China) He Yupeng	1	0	1
12	DF	(Cameroon) Michael Ngadeu-Ngadejui	1	0	1
12	MF	(China) Yu Dabao	0	1	1
Total			46	6	52

=== Clean sheets ===
Rank	Name	Chinese Super League	Chinese FA Cup	Total
1	(China) Han Jiaqi	5	1	6
2	(China) Hou Sen	4	0	4
Total		9	1	10

Numbers in parentheses represent games where both goalkeepers participated and both kept a clean sheet; the number in parentheses is awarded to the goalkeeper who was substituted on, whilst a full clean sheet is awarded to the goalkeeper who was on the field at the start of play.

=== Disciplinary record ===
N	P	Nat.	Name	Chinese Super League			Chinese FA Cup			Total			Notes
N	P	Nat.	Name	Yellow card	Second yellow card	Red card	Yellow card	Second yellow card	Red card	Yellow card	Second yellow card	Red card	Notes
24	FW	(Nigeria)	Samuel Adegbenro	1						1			
23	MF	(China)	Li Ke	6		1				6		1	
29	FW	(Angola)	Fábio Abreu	4			1			5			
3	DF	(China)	He Yupeng	4	1					4	1		
8	MF	(Portugal)	Guga	3						3			
34	GK	(China)	Hou Sen	2						2			
21	MF	(China)	Zhang Yuan	3		1				3		1	
5	DF	(Cameroon)	Michael Ngadeu-Ngadjui	6						6			
18	FW	(China)	Fang Hao	4						4			
2	DF	(Mali)	Mamadou Traoré	3		1				3		1	
10	MF	(China)	Zhang Xizhe	1						1			
20	FW	(China)	Wang Ziming	2						2			
11	FW	(China)	Lin Liangming	2						2			
22	MF	(China)	Yu Dabao	2	1					2	1		
16	DF	(China)	Feng Boxuan	1						1			
4	DF	(China)	Li Lei	4						4			
27	DF	(China)	Wang Gang	3			1			4			
17	FW	(China)	Yang Liyu	4						4			
37	FW	(China)	Cao Yongjing	1			2			3			
1	GK	(China)	Han Jiaqi	1						1			
6	MF	(China)	Chi Zhongguo	1			1			2			
9	FW	(China)	Zhang Yuning			1						1	

Only competitive matches
(yellow card) = Number of bookings; (second yellow card) = Number of sending offs after a second yellow card; (red card) = Number of sending offs by a direct red card.

== Awards and nominations ==
=== Matchday awards ===
==== Chinese Super League Player of the Round ====
Matchday	Pos.	Player	Result	Ref.
3	FW	(Angola) Fábio Abreu	Nominated	
8	FW	(China) Zhang Yuning	Nominated	
9	FW	(China) Cao Yongjing	Nominated	
11	FW	(China) Fang Hao	Nominated	
14	FW	(Angola) Fábio Abreu	Nominated	
17	DF	(Cameroon) Michael Ngadeu-Ngadjui	Nominated	
24	GK	(China) Han Jiaqi	Nominated	
21	DF	(Cameroon) Michael Ngadeu-Ngadjui	Nominated	
27	FW	(Angola) Fábio Abreu	Won	
28	FW	(China) Cao Yongjing	Nominated	
29	DF	(Cameroon) Michael Ngadeu-Ngadjui	Nominated	

=== Monthly awards ===
==== Guoan Player of the Month ====
The winners of the award were chosen by club-organized fan and media vote with fan votes weighing 80% and media votes weighing the remaining 20%.

Month	Pos.	Player	Pld	G	A	CS	Votes	Ref.
March	GK	(China) Hou Sen	3	0	0	2	29% fans, 62.5% media 35.7% total	
April	GK	(China) Hou Sen	6	0	0	1	77% fans, 75% media 76.6% total	
May	FW	(Angola) Fábio Abreu	5	5	3	–	51% fans, 87.5% media 58.3% total	
June	GK	(China) Han Jiaqi	3	0	0	3	43% fans, 12.5% media 37.2% total	
July	GK	(China) Han Jiaqi	5	0	0	1	64% fans, 62.5% media 63.7% total	
August	FW	(China) Wang Ziming	4	2	0	–	44% fans, 87.5% media 52.7% total	
September	FW	(China) Cao Yongjing	3	2	0	–	55% fans, 87.5% media 61.5% total	

==== Chinese Super League Player of the Month ====
Month	Pos.	Player	Result	Ref.
March	FW	(Angola) Fábio Abreu	Nominated	
April	FW	(China) Zhang Yuning	Nominated	
June	FW	(Angola) Fábio Abreu	Nominated	
September	FW	(Angola) Fábio Abreu	Nominated	
October/November	FW	(Angola) Fábio Abreu	Nominated	

==== Chinese Super League Team of the Month ====
Month	Pos.	Player	Pld	G	A	CS	S	Ref.
March	DF	(Cameroon) Michael Ngadeu-Ngadjui	3	0	0	3	–	
April	DF	(Cameroon) Michael Ngadeu-Ngadjui	6	1	0	1	–	
April	GK	(China) Hou Sen	6	0	0	1	26	
May	DF	(Mali) Mamadou Traoré	5	0	1	0	–	
August	DF	(Cameroon) Michael Ngadeu-Ngadjui	3	1	0	1	–	
September	FW	(Angola) Fábio Abreu	3	3	2	0	–	
September	DF	(China) Li Lei	3	1	1	0	–	
October/November	FW	(Angola) Fábio Abreu	3	2	5	1	–	
October/November	FW	(China) Lin Liangming	3	3	1	1	–	
October/November	DF	(Cameroon) Michael Ngadeu-Ngadjui	3	0	0	1	–	
October/November	GK	(China) Han Jiaqi	3	0	0	1	12	

==== Chinese Super League Goalkeeper of the Month ====
Month	Player	Result	Ref.
April	(China) Hou Sen	Won	
October/November	(China) Han Jiaqi	Won	

=== Annual Awards ===
==== Chinese Super League Team of the Season ====
Pos.	Player	Result	Ref.
DF	(China) Li Lei	Won	
