= Zhang Yuan (footballer, born 1997) =

Chinese footballer

Zhang Yuan 张源
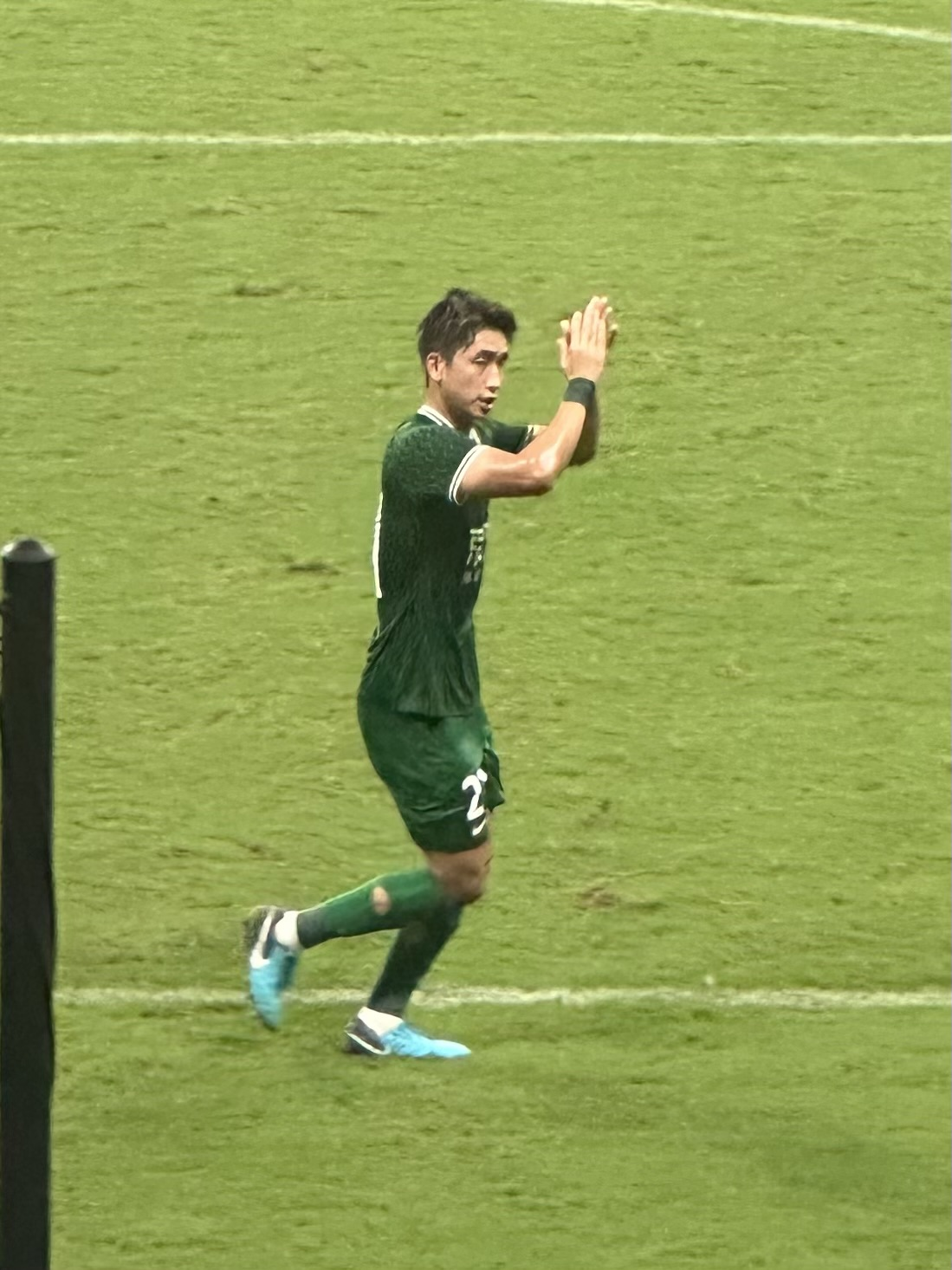
- Zhang in 2024

Personal information
- Date of birth: 28 January 1997 (age 29)
- Place of birth: Shangqiu, Henan, China
- Height: 1.84 m (6 ft 0 in)
- Position: Midfielder

Team information
- Current team: Shanghai Port
- Number: 6

Youth career
- Dalian Shide
- 2013–2015: Dalian Aerbin
- 2013–2015: → Mafra (loan)
- 2015–2016: Loures

Senior career*
Years	Team	Apps	(Gls)
2016–2017	Loures	4	(0)
2017–2019	Tianjin Quanjian	11	(0)
2018	→ Guizhou Hengfeng (loan)	11	(0)
2020–2023	Shenzhen FC	69	(5)
2023–2025	Beijing Guoan	37	(1)
2026–	Shanghai Port	14	(1)

International career^{‡}
2015–2016	China U19	25	(1)
2017–2018	China U23	11	(2)
- * Club domestic league appearances and goals as of 19 November 2026 ‡ National team caps and goals as of 4 September 2018

Zhang Yuan (simplified Chinese: 张源; traditional Chinese: 張源; pinyin: Zhāng Yuán; born 28 January 1997) is a Chinese professional footballer who plays as a midfielder for Chinese Super League club Shanghai Port.

== Club career ==
=== Early career ===
Zhang Yuan joined Dalian Aerbin's youth academy in 2013 after Dalian Shide dissolved. He was loaned to Portuguese side Mafra in the summer of 2013 and joined Loures in 2015. Zhang was promoted to Loures's first team squad in July 2016. He made his senior debut on 4 December 2016 in a 2–0 away win over Atlético CP, coming on as a substitute for Ivo Miranda in the 80th minute. He played four league matches for Loures in the 2016–17 season.

=== Tianjin Quanjian and loan spell ===
Zhang transferred to Chinese Super League side Tianjin Quanjian in July 2017. On 10 September 2017, he made his debut for Tianjin Quanjian in a 3–1 home win over Guizhou Hengfeng Zhicheng, coming on for Wang Yongpo in the 76th minute when Tianjin was leading 3–0.

On 26 February 2018, Zhang was loaned to fellow Super League side Guizhou Hengfeng for one season. On 11 March 2018, he made his debut for the club in a 3–2 home defeat against Hebei China Fortune, replacing Min Junlin in the 88th minute. On 25 April 2018, he scored his first senior goal in a 2–1 away win over Heilongjiang Lava Spring in the 4th round of 2018 Chinese FA Cup.

=== Shenzhen FC ===
In July 2020, Zhang was one of eight former Tianjin Tianhai players to sign with Shenzhen FC after the former club disbanded. He would go on to make his debut on 26 July 2020 in a league game against Guangzhou R&F in a 3-0 victory. His first Shenzhen and Super League goal – a 90th minute game-winning goal – came on 18 July 2021 in a 2–1 victory against Cangzhou Mighty Lions.

Zhang stayed at Shenzhen for three and a half seasons. In his last match for the team on 22 July 2023 against Tianjin Jinmen Tiger, he captained the team and led the team to a 3–3 draw. Reports indicate that Shenzhen had not paid its players their wages for over 15 months, and players received only a half-month's worth of wages ahead of the Tianjin game. Zhang Yuan's contract was terminated in July 2023 after mediation, and he left the club with 76 appearances, in which he scored 5 goals and assisted 4 times. Shenzhen FC disbanded in January 2024, citing financial insolvency.

=== Beijing Guoan ===
On 30 July 2023, Zhang joined fellow Chinese Super League side Beijing Guoan. Zhang had said that it was his dream to play for a major club like Guoan. He made his debut for the club on 9 August 2023, coming on as a substitute in a 0-0 away game against Tianjin Jinmen Tiger. However, Zhang failed to obtain a starting position during his first season at Guoan as the team had a number of talent in midfield, making only 2 appearances in the second half of the season.

Zhang's squad status was elevated in the 2024 season, and he garnered his first start at Guoan in the headline match against old rivals Shanghai Shenhua on 4 April 2024, playing 79 minutes before being replaced in the 1–1 draw. His fortune turned again on 30 April, he was sent off after just 19 minutes, again in an away game at Tianjin. Fortunately, a second-half goal by teammate Cao Yongjing still ensured 10-men Guoan obtain a victory. On 17 May 2024, Zhang gave away a penalty in the 96th minute in an away game against Changchun Yatai which resulted in a 2–3 Guoan defeat, and he received widespread criticism from fans. Zhang's redemption moment came when he replaced Li Ke in a 2–0 home win again against Tianjin on 21 July 2024 and scored his first goal for the club in the 98th minute of the game. In the post-game interview, he described the goal as giving him a "new start [and a] new life."

Zhang announced his departure from Guoan in December 2025 after two and a half years at the club as his contract expired. In 47 matches across all competitions, he scored 3 goals and assisted 6 more. His time at the club was punctuated with repeated injuries, and despite moments of brilliance he failed to fully establish himself at Guoan. He won the 2025 Chinese FA Cup with Guoan during his stint at the club.

On 19 January 2026, Zhang joined the 2025 Chinese Super League champion Shanghai Port.

== Career statistics ==
As of 11 December 2025.

Appearances and goals by club, season and competition
Club	Season	League			National cup		Continental		Other		Total	
Club	Season	Division	Apps	Goals	Apps	Goals	Apps	Goals	Apps	Goals	Apps	Goals
Loures	2016–17	Campeonato de Portugal	4	0	0	0	–		–		4	0
Tianjin Quanjian	2017	Chinese Super League	6	0	0	0	–		–		6	0
Tianjin Quanjian	2019	Chinese Super League	5	0	2	0	–		–		7	0
Tianjin Quanjian	Total		11	0	2	0	0	0	0	0	13	0
Guizhou Hengfeng (loan)	2018	Chinese Super League	11	0	2	1	–		–		13	1
Shenzhen FC	2020	Chinese Super League	15	0	1	0	–		–		16	0
Shenzhen FC	2021	Chinese Super League	16	2	4	0	–		–		20	2
Shenzhen FC	2022	Chinese Super League	23	1	1	0	–		–		24	1
Shenzhen FC	2023	Chinese Super League	15	2	1	0	–		–		16	2
Shenzhen FC	Total		69	5	7	0	0	0	0	0	76	5
Beijing Guoan	2023	Chinese Super League	2	0	1	0	–		–		3	0
Beijing Guoan	2024	Chinese Super League	21	1	2	0	–		–		23	1
Beijing Guoan	2025	Chinese Super League	14	0	1	1	6 (Note: Appearances in AFC Champions League Two)	1			21	2
Beijing Guoan	Total		37	1	4	1	6	1	0	0	47	3
Career total			132	6	15	2	6	1	0	0	153	9

== Honours ==
Beijing Guoan

- Chinese FA Cup: 2025
