= He Yupeng =

Chinese footballer

He Yupeng 何宇鹏
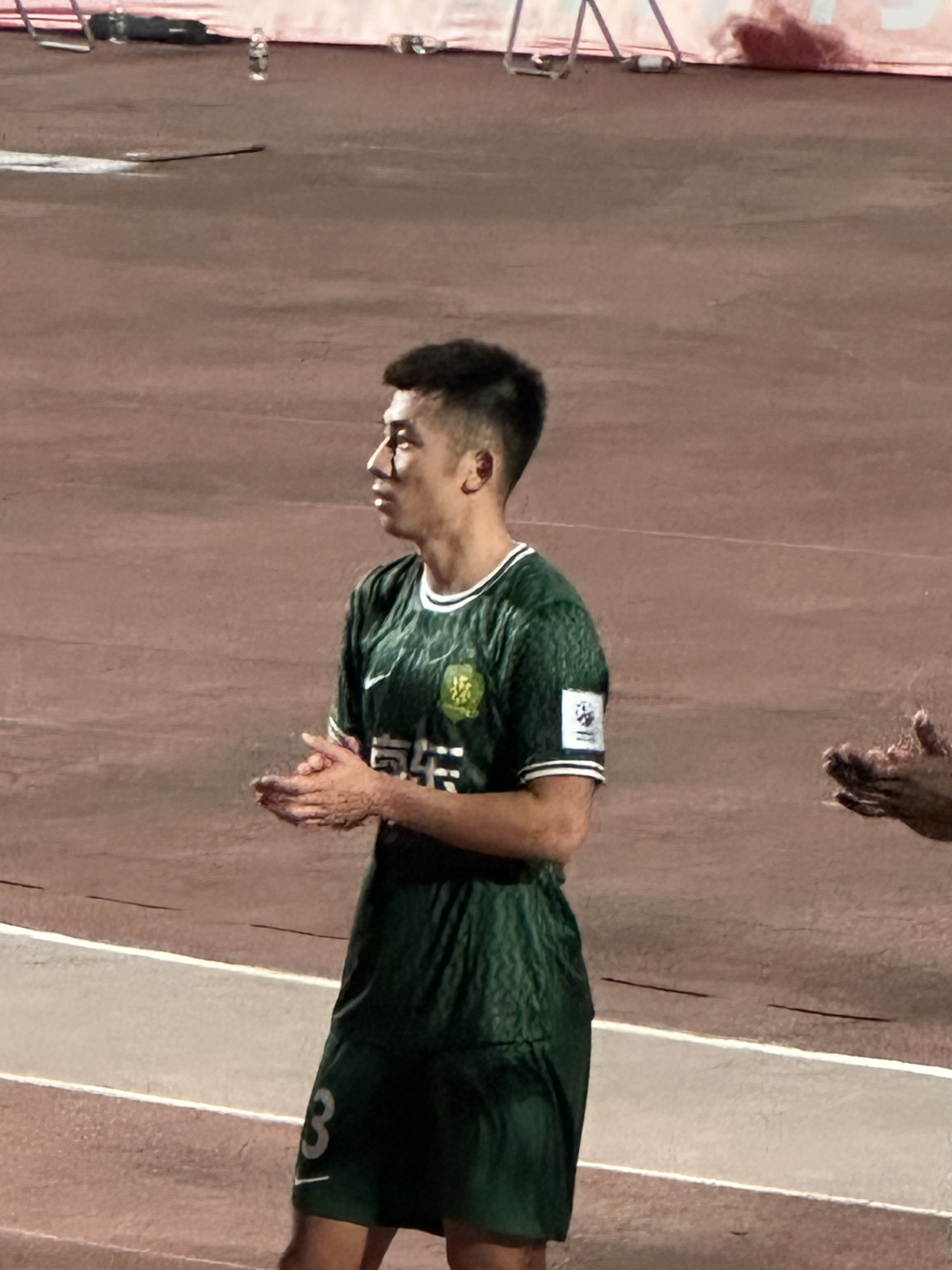
- He Yupeng in July 2024

Personal information
- Date of birth: 5 December 1999 (age 26)
- Place of birth: Anshan, Liaoning, China
- Height: 1.82 m (5 ft 11 1/2 in)
- Position: Defender

Team information
- Current team: Beijing Guoan
- Number: 3

Youth career
- Dalian Yifang

Senior career*
Years	Team	Apps	(Gls)
2019–2023	Dalian Pro	72	(2)
2024–	Beijing Guoan	32	(1)

International career^{‡}
2017–2020	China U19		
2021–2023	China U23		
2022–	China	5	(0)
Medal record
Representing China
Men's football
EAFF Championship
Bronze medal – third place	2022 Japan	Team
- * Club domestic league appearances and goals as of 1 September 2026 ‡ National team caps and goals as of 16 October 2023

He Yupeng (Chinese: 何宇鹏; pinyin: Hé Yǔpéng; born 5 December 1999) is a Chinese professional footballer who plays as a defender for Chinese Super League club Beijing Guoan.

== Club career ==
=== Dalian Yifang ===
He Yupeng previously played for the Dalian Yifang U19 team and also represented the China U20 team. He would be promoted to the Dalian Yifang's (now known as Dalian Professional) first team squad in the 2019 Chinese Super League campaign as an under 23 years old player. He made his debut on 7 April 2019 against Tianjin TEDA as part of the Chinese Super League rules requesting every team to field at least one player under 23 years old within the starting lineup, but was substituted off after just 18 minutes, in a match that ended in a 2-1 defeat. While initially only being used to fulfil a quota, he would start to actually establish himself within the team and went on to score his first league goal in an away game against Shenzhen FC on 19 May 2019, as a late substitute that came on the 90th minute to score the winning goal a minute later, and had to be substituted off again to allow another U-23 teammate to come on.

=== Beijing Guoan ===
On 14 February 2024, he joined fellow Chinese Super League club Beijing Guoan alongside teammate Lin Liangming on a free transfer, following the relegation and subsequent disbandment of Dalian Pro. On 2 March 2024, he made his debut for Guoan in a 2-0 away win against Cangzhou Mighty Lions. On 26 May 2024, he scored his first goal for the club in a 5-2 home win against Nantong Zhiyun.

== International career ==
On 20 July 2022, He made his international debut in a 3–0 defeat against South Korea in the 2022 EAFF E-1 Football Championship, as the Chinese FA decided to field the U-23 national team for this senior competition.

== Career statistics ==
As of 16 August 2024.

Appearances and goals by club, season and competition
Club	Season	League			National Cup		Continental		Other		Total	
Club	Season	Division	Apps	Goals	Apps	Goals	Apps	Goals	Apps	Goals	Apps	Goals
Dalian Professional	2019	Chinese Super League	13	1	1	0	-		-		14	1
Dalian Professional	2020	Chinese Super League	12	0	1	0	-		-		13	0
Dalian Professional	2021	Chinese Super League	10	0	2	0	-		0 (Note: Appearance(s) Promotion/Relegation Play-offs)	0	12	0
Dalian Professional	2022	Chinese Super League	16	1	1	0	–		–		17	1
Dalian Professional	2023	Chinese Super League	21	0	1	0	–		–		22	0
Dalian Professional	Total		72	2	6	0	0	0	0	0	78	2
Beijing Guoan	2024	Chinese Super League	18	1	1	0	–		–		19	1
Career total			90	3	7	0	0	0	0	0	97	3

== Honours ==
Beijing Guoan

- Chinese FA Cup: 2025
