= Lin Liangming =

Chinese footballer

Lin Liangming 林良铭
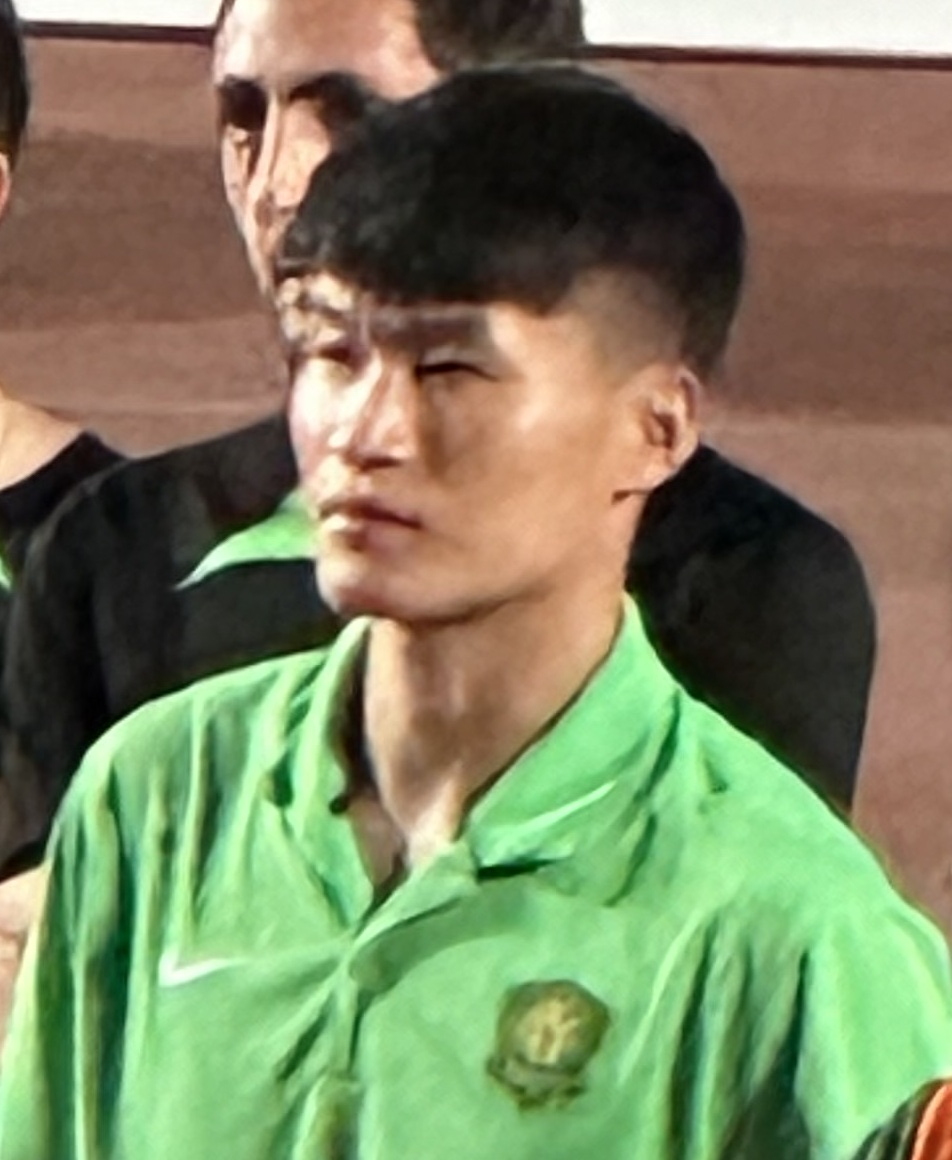
- Lin Liangming in July 2024

Personal information
- Full name: Lin Liangming
- Date of birth: 4 June 1997 (age 29)
- Place of birth: Shantou, Guangdong, China
- Height: 1.80 m (5 ft 11 in)
- Position: Winger

Team information
- Current team: Beijing Guoan
- Number: 11

Youth career
- 2010–2015: Guangzhou R&F
- 2015–2016: Real Madrid

Senior career*
Years	Team	Apps	(Gls)
2013	Guangzhou R&F	0	(0)
2016–2019	Real Madrid B	7	(0)
2017–2019	→ Almería B (loan)	60	(12)
2017–2019	→ Almería (loan)	0	(0)
2019	Marítimo U23	7	(0)
2020	→ Dalian Pro (loan)	8	(1)
2020–2023	Dalian Pro	73	(24)
2024–	Beijing Guoan	72	(21)

International career^{‡}
2012–2013	China U16	9	(3)
2015–2016	China U19	14	(9)
2018–2021	China U23	12	(4)
2023–	China	24	(3)
- * Club domestic league appearances and goals as of 8 November 2026 ‡ National team caps and goals as of 9 June 2026

Lin Liangming (simplified Chinese: 林良铭; traditional Chinese: 林良銘; pinyin: Lín Liángmíng; born 4 June 1997) is a Chinese professional footballer who plays as a winger for Chinese Super League club Beijing Guoan and the China national team.

== Club career ==
=== Spell in Spain ===
Lin Liangming started his football career when he joined Guangzhou R&F's youth academy in 2010. On 22 July 2015, Lin transferred to La Liga side Real Madrid for a transfer fee of €200,000, signing a five-year contract with the club, becoming the first ever East Asian footballer to sign for Real Madrid. He was placed in Real Madrid Juvenil to play for the under-19 side during the 2015-16 season. In July 2016, Lin was promoted to the club's reserve team Real Madrid Castilla. He made his debut for the reserve team on 20 August 2016 in a 3–2 win against Real Sociedad B, assisting Sergio Díaz's winning goal in the 90th minute.

On 24 August 2017, Lin was loaned out to Segunda División side UD Almería for the 2017-18 season, being initially assigned to Almería B in the Tercera División. He made his debut for the first team on 5 September 2017 in a 1–0 loss against Cádiz in the 2017-18 Copa del Rey. On 29 July 2018, after helping the club gain promotion to Segunda División B, Lin's loan was extended for a further year. On 30 August 2019, Lin joined Portuguese Primeira Liga side C.S. Marítimo. He started playing for the club's U23 squad.

=== Dalian Professional ===
After negotiating with the Portuguese clubs C.S. Marítimo and Gondomar S.C. (who also owned part of his contract), Lin would return to China to join top tier club Dalian Professional on 28 February 2020, initially on loan with the option to make it permanent. He would make his debut in a league game on 26 July 2020 against Shandong Luneng Taishan in a 3-2 defeat. This would be followed by his first goal for the club, which was in a league game on 29 August 2020 against Shandong Luneng Taishan where he scored the winner in a 1-0 victory.

=== Beijing Guoan ===
On 14 February 2024, Lin joined fellow Chinese Super League club Beijing Guoan alongside teammate He Yupeng on a free transfer, following the relegation and subsequent disbandment of Dalian Pro. On 2 March 2024, he made his debut for Guoan in a 2–0 away win against Cangzhou Mighty Lions. On 11 May 2024, he scored his first goal for the club in a 3–2 comeback home win against Meizhou Hakka. In his debut season for Guoan, he featured in 29 games across all competitions and scored 10 goals, the second highest in the team, and notched 3 assists. He was named in the league's October/November team of the month.

In the 2025 season, Lin continued to play a pivotal role for the team. Under new head coach Quique Setién, Lin became the first-choice left wingback in the coach's 3-5-2 formation. He continue to score goals in important matches, including the opener in an away draw against rival Shanghai Shenhua and the winning goal against Shanghai Port away from home. He was named the club's player of the month in May, and was selected in the league's team of the month.

== International career ==
After impressing in Guangzhou R&F's youth academy, Lin was called up to the Chinese national under-17 team for the 2012 AFC U-16 Championship. He first played for the Chinese under-20 national team during 2016 AFC U-19 Championship qualification, making three appearances and scoring two goals.

On 23 March 2023, Lin made his senior international debut in a 0–0 away draw against New Zealand. On 16 June 2023, Lin scored his first international goal in a 4–0 home win over Myanmar in an international friendly game played in Dalian, the same city where he also played club football at the time.

Lin was named in China's squad for the 2023 AFC Asian Cup in Qatar and appeared in all 3 matches in the tournament, but was unable to help prevent the team's elimination after group stage.

== Personal life ==
Lin is able to speak fluent Cantonese because he grew up in Guangzhou from a very young age, studying and beginning his youth football training there.

== Career statistics ==
=== Club ===
As of 20 November 2026

Appearances and goals by club, season and competition
Club	Season	League			National cup		Continental		Other		Total	
Club	Season	Division	Apps	Goals	Apps	Goals	Apps	Goals	Apps	Goals	Apps	Goals
Real Madrid B	2016-17	Segunda División B	7	0	–		–		–		7	0
Almería B (loan)	2017-18	Tercera División	32	8	–		–		4 (Note: Appearance(s) in Tercera División Play-offs)	0	36	8
Almería B (loan)	2018-19	Segunda División B	28	4	–		–		–		28	4
Almería B (loan)	Total		60	12	0	0	0	0	4	0	64	12
Almería (loan)	2017-18	Segunda División	0	0	1	0	–		–		1	0
Almería (loan)	2018-19	Segunda División	0	0	3	0	–		–		3	0
Almería (loan)	Total		0	0	4	0	0	0	0	0	4	0
Marítimo U23	2019-20	Liga Revelacao	7	0	–		–		–		7	0
Dalian Professional (loan)	2020	Chinese Super League	8	1	0	0	–		–		8	1
Dalian Professional	2020	Chinese Super League	6	2	0	0	–		–		6	2
Dalian Professional	2021	Chinese Super League	14	5	3	1	–		0 (Note: Appearance(s) in Promotion/Relegation Play-offs)	0	17	6
Dalian Professional	2022	Chinese Super League	28	12	0	0	–		–		28	12
Dalian Professional	2023	Chinese Super League	25	5	2	0	–		–		27	5
Dalian Professional	Total		73	24	5	1	0	0	0	0	78	25
Beijing Guoan	2024	Chinese Super League	26	10	3	1	–		–		29	10
Beijing Guoan	2025	Chinese Super League	25	6	2	1	5	1	–		32	8
Beijing Guoan	2026	Chinese Super League	21	5	3	2	2	0	0	0	26	7
Beijing Guoan	Total		72	21	8	4	7	1	0	0	87	25
Career total			227	58	17	5	7	1	4	0	255	63

=== International ===
Appearances and goals by national team and year
National team	Year	Apps	Goals
China	2023	6	2
China	2024	10	1
China	2025	2	0
China	2026	6	0
Total		24	3

As of 19 November 2024
Scores and results list China's goal tally first, score column indicates score after each Lin goal.

List of international goals scored by Lin Liangming
No.	Date	Venue	Opponent	Score	Result	Competition
1	16 June 2023	Dalian Suoyuwan Football Stadium, Dalian, China	Myanmar	2–0	4–0	Friendly
2	9 September 2023	Phoenix Hill Football Stadium, Chengdu, China	Malaysia	1–1	1–1	Friendly
3	19 November 2024	Xiamen Egret Stadium, Xiamen, China	Japan	1–2	1–3	2026 FIFA World Cup qualification

== Honours ==
Beijing Guoan

- Chinese FA Cup: 2025
- Chinese FA Super Cup: 2026
