= Fábio Abreu =

Angolan footballer (born 1993)

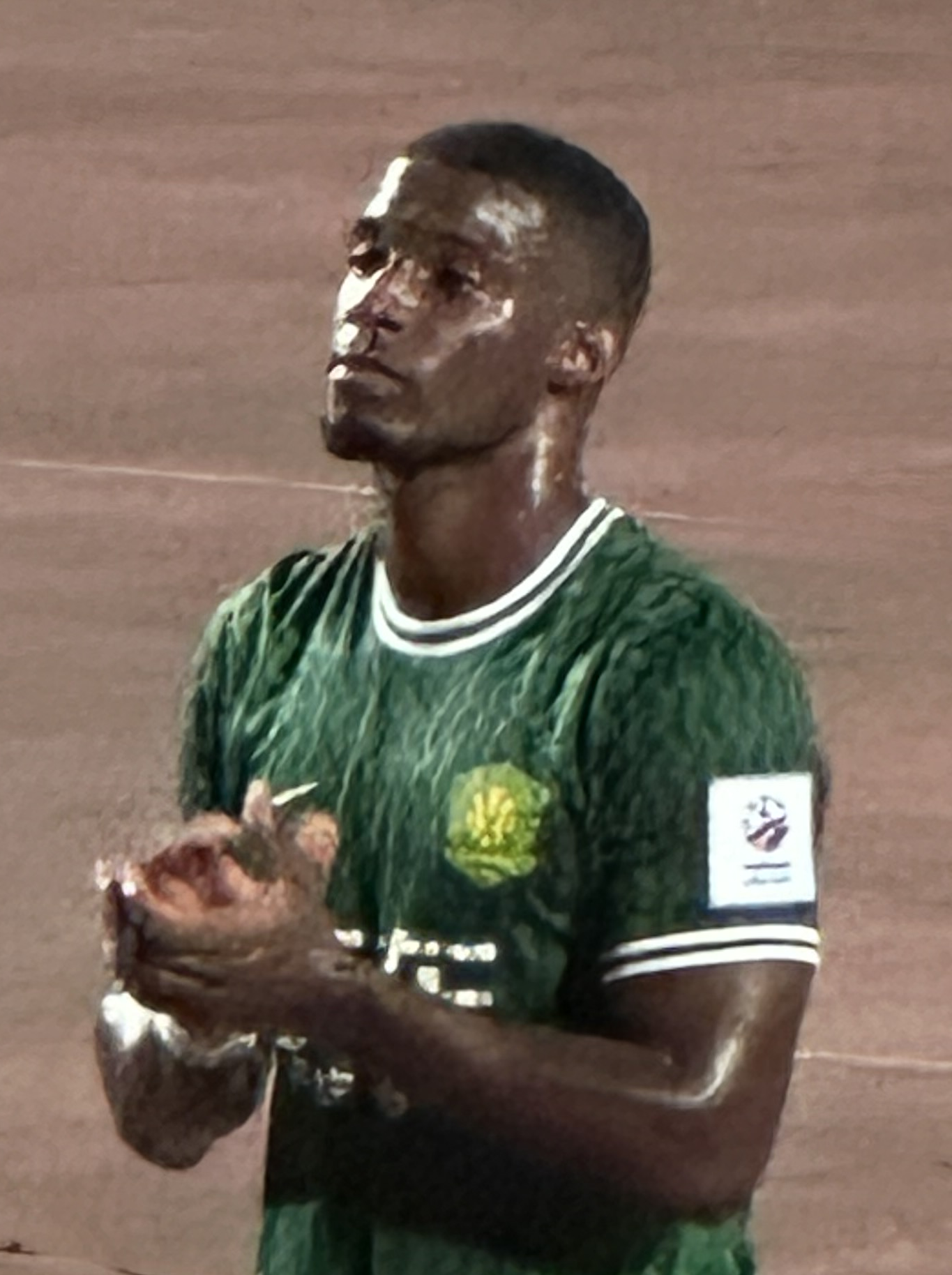
- Abreu in July 2024

Personal information
- Full name: Fábio Gonçalves Abreu
- Date of birth: 29 January 1993 (age 33)
- Place of birth: Lisbon, Portugal
- Height: 1.82 m (5 ft 11 1/2 in)
- Position: Striker

Team information
- Current team: Beijing Guoan
- Number: 29

Youth career
- 2009−2010: Bacup Borough
- 2010−2011: Mossley
- 2011−2012: Marítimo

Senior career*
Years	Team	Apps	(Gls)
2012−2017	Marítimo B	85	(24)
2012–2013	→ Ribeira Brava (loan)	12	(4)
2015−2016	Marítimo	8	(0)
2017−2019	Penafiel	64	(20)
2019−2020	Moreirense	37	(15)
2020–2022	Al Batin	56	(26)
2022–2023	Khor Fakkan	15	(6)
2023–	Beijing Guoan	93	(63)

International career
2019−2021	Angola	8	(1)
- * Club domestic league appearances and goals as of 19 November 2026

Fábio Gonçalves Abreu (born 29 January 1993) is a professional footballer who plays as a striker for Chinese Super League club Beijing Guoan. Born in Portugal, he represented the Angola national team.

== Club career ==
=== Early career and Marítimo ===
Born in Lisbon of Angolan descent, Abreu moved to Manchester in England as a child, where he attended Loreto College. He played youth football for Bacup Borough and Mossley, and trialled with S.L. Benfica before signing a three-year contract with C.S. Marítimo in July 2011. In 2012, he was loaned to amateurs Clube Desportivo Ribeira Brava – also in the island of Madeira – to kickstart his senior career.

Abreu spent the better part of his spell at the Estádio do Marítimo registered with the reserve side. His first Primeira Liga appearance with the first team occurred on 1 February 2015, when he came on as a late substitute in a 1−1 away draw against Académica de Coimbra. In May 2014, he renewed his contract until June 2017.

=== Penafiel ===
On 10 July 2017, Abreu signed a two-year deal with LigaPro team F.C. Penafiel as a free agent. With 12 goals in his first season, he ranked seventh in the league's goalscorers, including a hat-trick on 21 October in a 4–1 home victory over Sporting CP B.

=== Moreirense ===
In June 2019, Abreu returned to the top division when he joined Moreirense F.C. for three years; he released himself from an agreement with Gil Vicente F.C. in order to do so. On 11 August, at home to precisely that team, he scored his first top-flight goal to open a 3–0 win, and from February to March 2020 he netted in six consecutive games, ending with one in a 2–0 defeat of former club Marítimo. He finished the campaign as an ever-present with 13 goals, the fifth-most in the league.

=== Asia ===
On 13 October 2020, Abreu signed for Saudi Professional League club Al Batin FC in a €2.5 million transfer, under Portuguese manager José Garrido. He scored on his debut 16 days later, equalising in a 2–1 home win over Al Raed FC.

Abreu moved to the UAE Pro League with Khor Fakkan Club in July 2022. One year later, he agreed to a deal at Chinese Super League side Beijing Guoan FC. He scored his first goals on 26 July 2023, a brace in the 4–1 away victory against Qingdao West Coast F.C. in the round of 16 of the FA Cup.

Abreu completed his first hat-trick for Guoan on 28 September 2024, in a 8–1 home defeat of Changchun Yatai FC. He was crowned top scorer for the 2025 season, with 28 goals from games. On 6 December that year, he scored a hat-trick in the final of the domestic cup to help beat Henan F.C. 3–0, for the club's sixth title in the competition.

== International career ==
Abreu played three games for England Schoolboys in 2010. He won his first cap for Angola on 6 September 2019, featuring the entire 1−0 away win over Gambia for the 2022 FIFA World Cup qualifiers, and scored his first goal in the return leg, a 2−1 victory in Luanda that qualified the team to the group phase.

== Career statistics ==
=== Club ===
Club	Season	League			National Cup		League Cup		Continental		Other		Total	
Club	Season	Division	Apps	Goals	Apps	Goals	Apps	Goals	Apps	Goals	Apps	Goals	Apps	Goals
Marítimo B	2013–14	Segunda Liga	32	3	—		—		—		—		32	3
Marítimo B	2014–15	Segunda Liga	23	2	—		—		—		—		23	2
Marítimo B	2015–16	Campeonato de Portugal	30	19	—		—		—		—		30	19
Marítimo B	Total		85	24	—		—		—		—		85	24
Ribeira Brava (loan)	2012–13	Segunda Divisão	12	4	—		—		—		—		12	4
Marítimo	2014–15	Primeira Liga	7	0	0	0	0	0	—		—		7	0
Marítimo	2015–16	Primeira Liga	1	0	0	0	0	0	—		—		1	0
Marítimo	Total		8	0	0	0	0	0	—		—		8	0
Penafiel	2017–18	LigaPro	36	12	1	0	1	0	—		—		38	12
Penafiel	2018–19	LigaPro	28	8	2	0	1	0	—		—		31	8
Penafiel	Total		64	20	3	0	2	0	—		—		69	20
Moreirense	2019–20	Primeira Liga	34	13	2	2	1	0	—		—		37	15
Moreirense	2020–21	Primeira Liga	3	2	—		—		—		—		3	2
Moreirense	Total		37	15	2	2	1	0	—		—		40	17
Al Batin	2020–21	Saudi Pro League	28	17	2	1	—		—		—		30	18
Al Batin	2021–22	Saudi Pro League	28	9	2	1	—		—		—		30	10
Al Batin	Total		56	26	4	2	—		—		—		60	28
Khor Fakkan	2022–23	UAE Pro League	15	6	1	0	0	0	—		—		16	6
Beijing Guoan	2023	Chinese Super League	13	10	2	2	—		—		—		15	12
Beijing Guoan	2024	Chinese Super League	27	14	3	1	—		—		—		30	15
Beijing Guoan	2025	Chinese Super League	30	28	4	4	—		5	1	—		39	33
Beijing Guoan	2026	Chinese Super League	23	11	1	0			2	1	1	0	27	12
Beijing Guoan	Total		83	63	10	7	—		7	2	1	0	111	72
Career total			370	158	20	11	3	0	7	2	1	0	399	171

=== International ===
Scores and results list Angola's goal tally first, score column indicates score after each Abreu goal.

List of international goals scored by Fábio Abreu
No.	Date	Venue	Opponent	Score	Result	Competition
1	10 September 2019	Estádio 11 de Novembro, Luanda, Angola	Gambia	2–1	2–1	2022 FIFA World Cup qualification

== Honours ==
Beijing Guoan

- Chinese FA Cup: 2025
- Chinese FA Super Cup: 2026

Individual

- Chinese Super League Golden Boot: 2025
- Chinese Super League Team of the Year: 2025
