= Cao Yongjing =

Chinese football player

Cao Yongjing 曹永竞
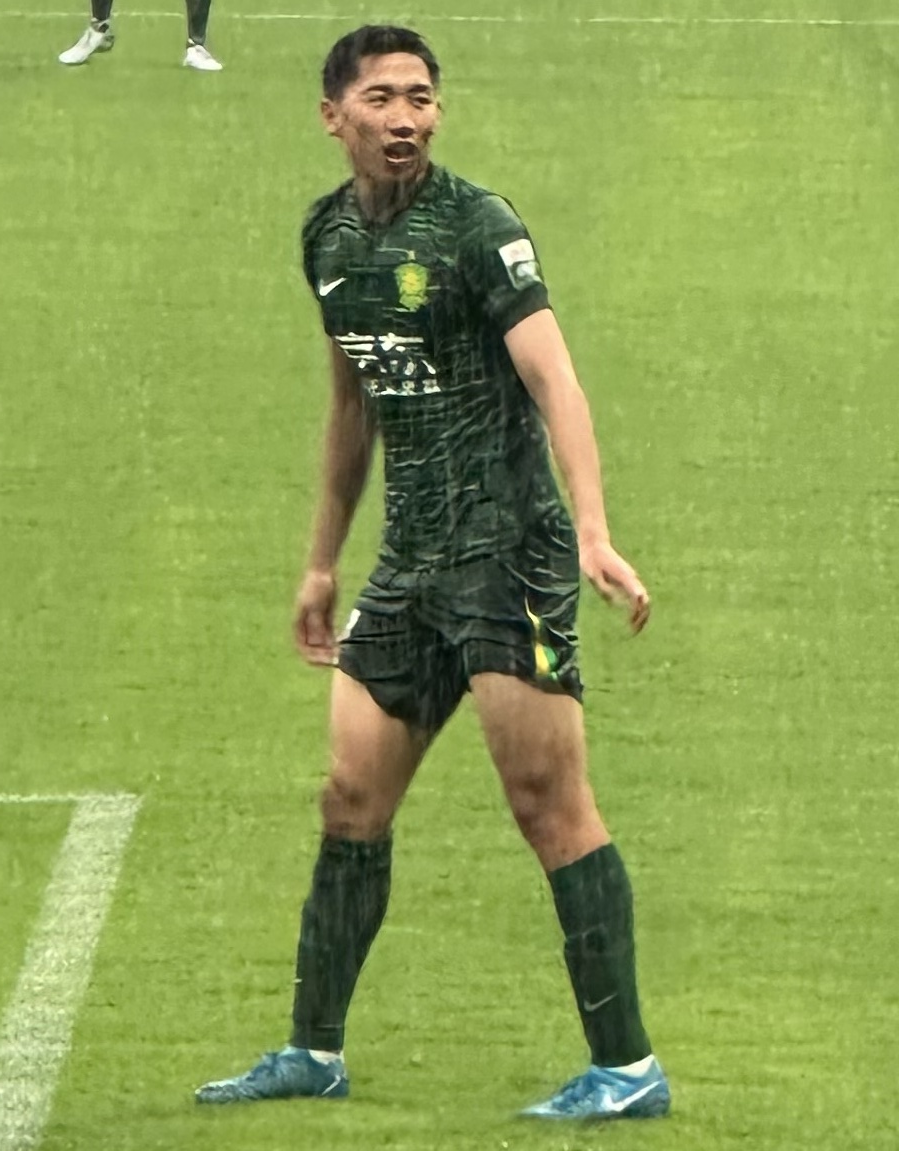
- Cao Yongjing in June 2025

Personal information
- Date of birth: 15 February 1997 (age 29)
- Place of birth: Chongqing, Sichuan, China
- Height: 1.80 m (5 ft 11 in)
- Position: Midfielder

Team information
- Current team: Beijing Guoan
- Number: 37

Senior career*
| Years | Team | Apps | (Gls) |
| 2015–2020 | Beijing Renhe | 89 | (8) |
| 2021– | Beijing Guoan | 108 | (16) |
| 2023 | → Changchun Yatai (loan) | 20 | (2) |

International career^{‡}
| 2015–2016 | China U-19 | 18 | (2) |
| 2017–2019 | China U-23 | 17 | (1) |
| 2024– | China | 5 | (0) |
Medal record
Representing China
Men's football
EAFF Championship
| Bronze medal – third place | 2025 South Korea | Team |
- * Club domestic league appearances and goals as of 19 November 2026 ‡ National team caps and goals as of 19 November 2024

Cao Yongjing (Chinese: 曹永竞; born 15 February 1997) is a Chinese professional footballer who plays for Chinese Super League club Beijing Guoan and the China national team.

== Club career ==
=== Beijing Renhe ===
Cao Yongjing was promoted to Chinese Super League side Guizhou Renhe's first team squad in 2015. On 14 March 2015, he made his Super League debut in a 2-0 away defeat at Jiangsu Sainty, coming on as a substitute for Magnus Eriksson in the 76th minute. Unfortunately he would be part of the team that was relegated at the end of the 2015 Chinese Super League season. He would remain loyal towards the club as they moved locations, renamed themselves Beijing Renhe and gained promotion back into the top tier at the end of the 2017 league season. On 15 April 2017, he scored his first goal for the club in a 2-1 home win against Meizhou Hakka.

On 10 March 2018, he scored hist first Chinese Super League goal in a 2-1 away win against Tianjin Quanjian. At the end of the 2019 Chinese Super League he would experience another relegation with the club.

=== Beijing Guoan ===
On 9 February 2021, Cao joined city rivals Beijing Guoan on a free transfer following the disbandment of Beijing Renhe, and was given the number 37 shirt. On 24 April 2021, he made his debut in the opening league game against Shanghai Shenhua that ended in a 2-1 defeat. On 4 January 2022, he scored his first goal for the club in the final league game of the season against Shenzhen F.C. in a 1-0 victory.

==== Loan to Changchun Yatai ====
On 7 April 2023, Cao joined fellow Chinese Super League club Changchun Yatai on loan for the 2023 season. On 15 April 2023, he made his debut for Yatai in a 2-0 away win against Zhejiang Professional. On 14 May 2023, he scored his first goal for the club in a 2-2 away draw against Chengdu Rongcheng.

==== Return from loan ====
After returning to Guoan following a loan spell at Yatai, Cao reached a career peak during the 2024 season, where he scored a career-high 8 goals in only 15 appearances.

== International career ==
On 14 November 2024, Cao made his international debut in a 1-0 away win against Bahrain in the third round of 2026 FIFA World Cup qualification.

== Career statistics ==
Statistics accurate as of match played 2 November 2024.

Appearances and goals by club, season and competition
| Club | Season | League | | | National Cup | | Continental | | Other | | Total | |
| Club | Season | Division | Apps | Goals | Apps | Goals | Apps | Goals | Apps | Goals | Apps | Goals |
|---|---|---|---|---|---|---|---|---|---|---|---|---|
| Guizhou Renhe/ Beijing Renhe | 2015 | Chinese Super League | 1 | 0 | 2 | 0 | - | | - | | 3 | 0 |
| Guizhou Renhe/ Beijing Renhe | 2017 | China League One | 27 | 3 | 1 | 0 | - | | - | | 28 | 3 |
| Guizhou Renhe/ Beijing Renhe | 2018 | Chinese Super League | 22 | 2 | 2 | 0 | - | | - | | 24 | 0 |
| Guizhou Renhe/ Beijing Renhe | 2019 | Chinese Super League | 25 | 0 | 1 | 0 | - | | - | | 26 | 0 |
| Guizhou Renhe/ Beijing Renhe | 2020 | China League One | 14 | 3 | - | | - | | 2 (Note: Appearances in Promotion/Relegation Playoffs) | 0 | 16 | 3 |
| Guizhou Renhe/ Beijing Renhe | Total | | 89 | 8 | 6 | 0 | 0 | 0 | 2 | 0 | 97 | 8 |
| Beijing Guoan | 2021 | Chinese Super League | 19 | 1 | 1 | 0 | 0 | 0 | - | | 20 | 1 |
| Beijing Guoan | 2022 | Chinese Super League | 19 | 1 | 1 | 1 | - | | - | | 20 | 2 |
| Beijing Guoan | 2024 | Chinese Super League | 15 | 8 | 2 | 0 | - | | - | | 17 | 8 |
| Beijing Guoan | Total | | 53 | 10 | 4 | 1 | 0 | 0 | 0 | 0 | 57 | 11 |
| Changchun Yatai (loan) | 2023 | Chinese Super League | 20 | 2 | 1 | 1 | - | | - | | 21 | 3 |
| Career total | | | 162 | 20 | 11 | 2 | 0 | 0 | 2 | 0 | 175 | 22 |

== Honours ==
Beijing Guoan

- Chinese FA Cup: 2025
- Chinese FA Super Cup: 2026
