= Yang Haocheng =

Chinese translator, editor, and scholar (1963–2018)

Yang Haocheng (杨昊成, 1963–2018) was a Chinese translator, editor, and scholar. He spent most of his career at Nanjing Normal University, and translated works by Jonathan Swift, Ernest Hemingway and Margaret Atwood into Chinese. In 2014, he founded the translation journal Chinese Arts and Letters. Among his scholarly works, his 2009 study on the iconographic use of Mao Zedong's image was widely noted.
