= He Longhai =

Chinese association football player

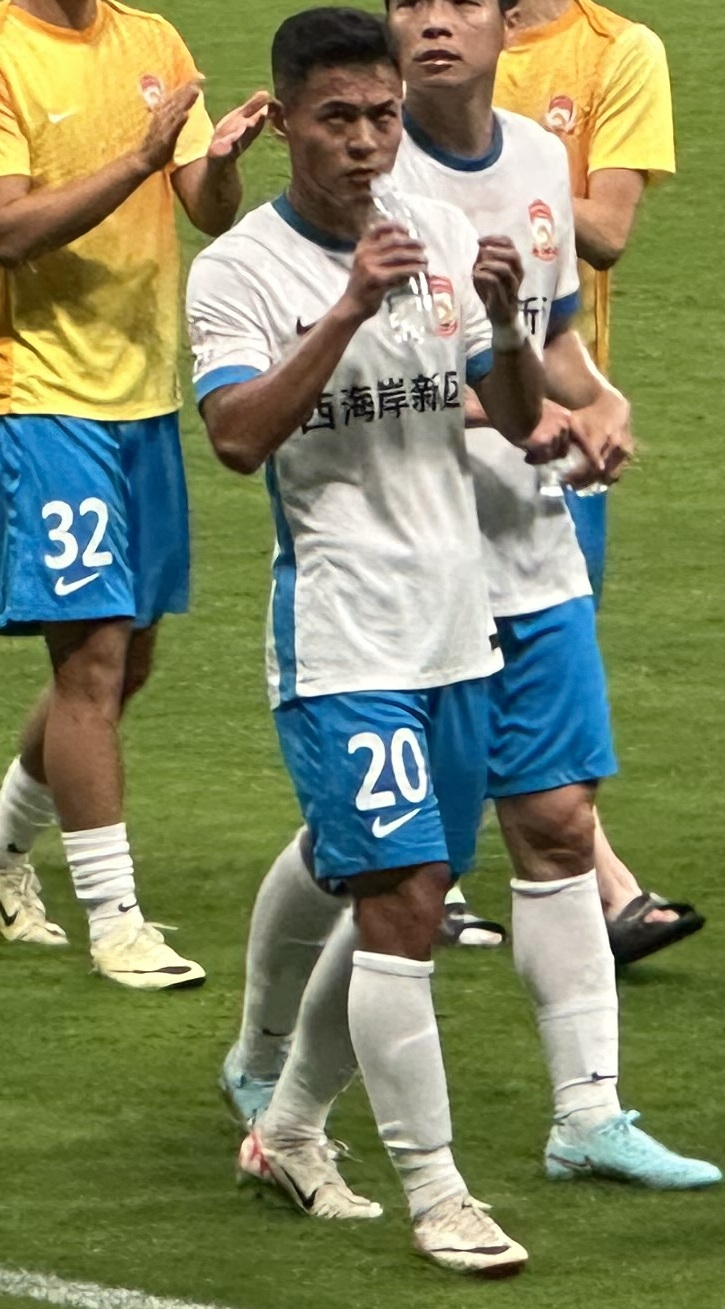
- He Longhai in June 2025

Personal information
- Date of birth: 8 October 2001 (age 25)
- Place of birth: Suining, Sichuan, China
- Height: 1.71 m (5 ft 7 in)
- Positions: Midfielder; full-back

Team information
- Current team: Qingdao West Coast
- Number: 20

Youth career
- –2017: Sichuan FA
- 2018–2020: Shonan Bellmare

Senior career*
| Years | Team | Apps | (Gls) |
| 2021–2024 | Shanghai Shenhua | 8 | (2) |
| 2024 | → Qingdao West Coast (loan) | 17 | (1) |
| 2025– | Qingdao West Coast | 45 | (0) |

International career^{‡}
| 2017 | China U16 | 1 | (0) |
| 2018–2019 | China U19 | 5 | (0) |
| 2023 | China U22 | 3 | (0) |
- * Club domestic league appearances and goals as of 19 November 2026 ‡ National team caps and goals as of 14:01, 18 November 2021 (UTC)

He Longhai (Chinese: 何龙海; born 8 October 2001) is a Chinese footballer currently playing as a midfielder or full-back for Qingdao West Coast.

== Club career ==
He Longhai would go abroad to Japanese club Shonan Bellmare to further his youth development. He would go on to be selected for the Chinese U19 team, however he would break curfew along with several of his teammates to go out drinking while on duty with the squad, which resulted in a suspension of six months from 1 June to 30 November 2020. While he was suspended top tier Chinese club Shanghai Shenhua allowed him to continue to train with them and officially signed him to their senior team on 26 February 2021 and gave him the number 29 jersey.

On 14 October 2021 he would make his debut for Shenhua in a Chinese FA Cup game against Sichuan Minzu in a 3-0 victory. On 23 December 2022 in a league game against Cangzhou Mighty Lions he would score his first goal for the club in a 3-0 victory.

On 14 February 2025, he left Shenhua and joined another Chinese Super League club Qingdao West Coast.

== Career statistics ==
As of 21 July 2026.

| Club | Season | League | | | Cup | | Continental | | Other | | Total | |
| Club | Season | Division | Apps | Goals | Apps | Goals | Apps | Goals | Apps | Goals | Apps | Goals |
|---|---|---|---|---|---|---|---|---|---|---|---|---|
| Shanghai Shenhua | 2021 | Chinese Super League | 2 | 0 | 3 | 0 | - | | - | | 5 | 0 |
| Shanghai Shenhua | 2022 | Chinese Super League | 4 | 2 | 3 | 0 | - | | - | | 7 | 2 |
| Shanghai Shenhua | 2023 | Chinese Super League | 2 | 0 | 2 | 0 | - | | - | | 4 | 0 |
| Shanghai Shenhua | Total | | 8 | 2 | 8 | 0 | 0 | 0 | 0 | 0 | 16 | 2 |
| Qingdao West Coast (loan) | 2024 | Chinese Super League | 17 | 1 | 1 | 0 | - | | - | | 18 | 1 |
| Qingdao West Coast | 2025 | Chinese Super League | 27 | 0 | 3 | 0 | - | | - | | 30 | 0 |
| Qingdao West Coast | 2026 | Chinese Super League | 10 | 0 | 1 | 0 | - | | - | | 11 | 0 |
| Qingdao West Coast | Total | | 37 | 0 | 4 | 0 | 0 | 0 | 0 | 0 | 41 | 0 |
| Career total | | | 62 | 3 | 13 | 0 | 0 | 0 | 0 | 0 | 75 | 3 |
