= 2020 Beijing Sinobo Guoan F.C. season =

Beijing Sinobo Guoan
2020 season
- General Manager: Li Ming
- Manager: Bruno Génésio
- Stadium: Workers' Stadium; Beijing Fengtai Stadium
- Super League: 3rd
- FA Cup: Quarter-finals
- AFC Champions League: Quarter-finals
- Top goalscorer: League: Cédric Bakambu (14); All: Cédric Bakambu (14)
- Highest home attendance: 2,785 (vs Shandong Luneng, 17 October 2020) (Note: The group stage of the 2020 season Chinese Super League saw the 16 participating teams split into two groups playing either at Dalian or Suzhou to mitigate potential impact of COVID-19. Home and away games are designations only as all teams competed and shared local stadiums and training facilities.)
- Lowest home attendance: 742 (vs Chongqing Lifan, 1 September 2020)
- Average home league attendance: 1,670
- Biggest win: Beijing Guoan 5–1 Qingdao Huanghai Beijing Guoan 4–0 Shijiazhuang Ever Bright
- Biggest defeat: Beijing Guoan 0–3 Wuhan Zall
Home colours	Away colours

The 2020 season was Beijing Sinobo Guoan F.C.'s 56th season in football competition and the club's 17th consecutive season in the Chinese Super League since the league's founding in the 2004. It is the team's 30th consecutive season in the top flight of Chinese football. It covers a period from 1 January 2020 to 31 December 2020.

== Summary ==
=== Pre-season ===
Guoan announced a 1-year contract extension for manager Bruno Génésio on 5 December 2019, confirming that he would remain for the start of the 2020 season.

Club veteran and former captain Yang Zhi parted with the club after his contract expired on 31 December 2019. Hu Yanqiang and Zhang Yu also left Guoan for trials at other football clubs. Chi Wenyi and Jin Pengxiang returned from their respective loan spells. Jiang Tao's contract with the club expired at the end of the previous season but was invited to pre-season training with the team.

The team regrouped on 3 January 2020 and headed to Murcia for the first pre-season training camp in hope of gaining fitness and match preparedness. The team participated in two friendlies, in which Guoan won 1–0 against the AFE Trial Team and lost 2–5 against 1. FC Heidenheim. All three Guoan goals came from Renato Augusto.

Due to the COVID-19 pandemic, the team altered original plans of training in Hainan and instead traveled to Jeju City on 29 January for further pre-season training after the Lunar New Year. On 30 January, the Chineses Football Association announced that all matches in Chinese soccer would be delayed indefinitely in order to minimize chances for infection. Asian Football Confederation also changed AFC Champions League schedule with Guoan playing first two group stage games away from home.

On 3 February, the club announced the arrival of Tianjin TEDA's Yang Fan. The transfer cost the club ¥2000M and Lei Tenglong joins Tianjin TEDA in the same deal. The club also announced the contract extension to the end of the 2020 season of Jiang Tao.

=== February ===
On 18 February, Wang Ziming scored the sole goal in the opening game of the season, putting Guoan 0–1 past Chiangrai United in both teams' first match in the AFC Champions League group stage. The team then went on another break as the coronavirus delayed the opening of Chinese Super League. The team planned on regrouping on 10 March for further preparation in the UAE. Players were instructed not to return to China as a measure to prevent infection.

On 23 February, Zhang Yu and Liu Huan's respective loans to Changchun Yatai and Chongqing Lifan were announced. The club announced on 29 February that A Lan would join the team on loan from Guangzhou Evergrande for the season.

=== March ===
On 2 March, The AFC announced postponement of Champions League matches due to the intensifying COVID-19 pandemic with the second to sixth round of the group stage to be played in May and June, and all previously postponed games must be rescheduled before August. Because of this rescheduling, the team no longer had matches in March and April, and therefore ordered players previously on break abroad to return to China on 9 March. After a short stay in Beijing, the team departed for Kunming on 31 March for a 25-day long preparation.

=== April ===
Players arrived in Kunming and began training. Li Ke, who was on break in Los Angeles, returned to China and underwent the mandatory 14-day coronavirus quarantine before joining the team in Kunming. On 14 April, AFC announced that previously rescheduled Champions League matches in May and June would be further postponed. The team concluded the Kunming training camp on 24 April and players again went on break. They were ordered not to leave China as the Chinese government restricted reentry in the context of the COVID-19 pandemic. China placed a nationwide ban on most foreign visitors, leaving the return date of foreign players, including Augusto, Bakambu, Viera and Fernando, as well as coach Bruno Génésio, unknown. Hou Yongyong and A Lan, although naturalized and allowed to return, faced travel difficulties as the number of international flights are greatly reduced.

=== May ===
The team regrouped on 11 May and underwent coronavirus testing. After being cleared, team members began their training camp at Beijing Renhe's training facilities. Hou Yongyong and A Lan landed in China on 11 May and 14 May respectively and began their mandatory quarantine per Chinese government regulations. On 16 May, Guoan defeated Beijing Renhe 2–0 in a friendly game with 30-minute halves. Zhang Yuning and Wang Ziming scored for Guoan. On 22 May, Guoan lost 0–2 to Renhe in the second friendly between the two teams.

=== June ===
Hou Yongyong and A Lan completed their quarantine requirements and joined the team on 3 June and 5 June respectively. On 5 June, Guoan defeated Tianjin TEDA 5–0 in a friendly with goals from Wang Ziming, Zhang Yuning, Jin Pengxiang, and a brace from A Lan. Guoan moved to Gaoxin Training Base in the Fengtai District of Beijing on 8 June and held a public training session on 12 June. However, after the reemergence of coronavirus cases in Beijing's Xinfadi Market, the scheduled friendlies against Hebei China Fortune on 13 June and against Shandong Luneng on 17 and 20 June were cancelled. The team subsequently announced a break on 15 June lasting until 22 June. Everyone involved in training were tested for coronavirus infection and everyone was cleared. The team resumed training at training facilities located in Xianghe, Hebei on 22 June. It was reported on 23 June that Guoan's foreign players and coaches successfully obtained Chinese visa and the team is working on their return following other CSL Super League clubs' success in doing so. Manager Bruno Génésio entered China via Shanghai on 22 June and is currently undergoing mandatory quarantine. Bakambu and two assistant coaches arrived at Shanghai as well on 26 June. Guoan played a friendly against Beijing Sport University F.C. at its Xianghe training camp on 26 June as well. Guoan won 4–3 with Piao Cheng scoring two and Zhang Xizhe and Wang Ziming each netting one.

=== July ===
The Chinese FA announced on 1 July that the 2020 season of Chinese Super League would commence on 25 July. The 16 teams would be split into two groups competing respectively in Dalian and Suzhou. Guoan was placed into Group B and will play in Suzhou. The first four places of each group would enter the Championship stage to compete for the overall league winner, and the bottom four places of each group would enter the Relegation stage, through which three relegation teams would be determined. The summer transfer window also opened on 1 July and is set to last until 30 July. Chi Wenyi left the team for Hebei China Fortune.

Guoan flew to Shanghai on 2 July for final preparation before the league's official start and played 4 friendly matches to enhance match preparedness. Guoan played Zhejiang Greentown in a friendly on 4 July and won 1–0 courtesy of A Lan's goal. On 5 July, Viera arrived in Shanghai while Kim Min-jae landed in Shenyang, and both are undergoing mandatory COVID-19 quarantine. Augusto and Fernando landed in Shanghai on 7 July aboard a club-chartered plane, while manager Bruno Génésio completed his quarantine requirement and joined team training. The team lost a friendly 1–4 against Nantong Zhiyun on 8 July with A Lan's penalty the only Guoan goal. Bakambu completed his quarantine and joined team training on 10 July. On 11 July, Guoan won 6–1 against Shanghai Jiading with A Lan and Zhang Yuning each scoring a brace along with goals from Wang Ziming and Ba Dun. 14 July saw Guoan victorious against Zhejiang Greentown in a friendly thanks to a penalty from A Lan and a goal from Bakambu. On 17 July, Guoan emerged victorious in a friendly against Shanghai Shenhua with Hou Yongyong scoring in the 70th minute. The team headed to Suzhou on 19 July ahead of the opening league match. 20 July saw Viera and Kim complete their respective quarantine requirements and both players joined the team in Suzhou. Augusto and Fernando joined team training after completing their quarantine on 22 July, marking the first time the entire first team squad is together in training since the February.

In the Chinese Super League season opener on 26 July, Li Lei and Piao Cheng netted a goal each to secure a 1–2 victory against Chongqing Lifan despite Yang Fan's red card in the 25th minute.

=== August ===
On 1 August, Viera's goal in the third minute separated Guoan from Wuhan Zall. In the 6 August game against Tianjin TEDA, goals from A Lan and Zhang Xizhe together with an own goal from opposition player saw Guoan win 1–3. A Lan netted his first goal for the club and Zhang Xizhe became the club's all-time top scorer with 41 goals total. Piao Cheng suffered a torn ACL during the game and will be out for an estimated 8 to 10 months. On 12 August, Jin Taiyan, Zhang Yuning and Hou Yongyong contributed goals in Guoan's 3–1 victory against Hebei China Fortune, extending the team's winning streak to four games as Guoan remains top of the Group B table. On 16 August, Guoan gave up the three goal lead courtesy from Bakambu, A Lan and Hou Yongyong and was only able to manage a 3–3 draw against Qingdao Huanghai. The team suffered its first loss of the season on 22 August against Shanghai SIPG. Despite Bakambu scoring an early lead, the game ended 1–2 in favor of Shanghai SIPG. On 27 August, Guoan's winless streak stretched to 3 games as it tied Shijiazhuang Even Bright 2–2. A Lan scored in the 24th minute to give Guoan an early lead, but Guo Quanbo received a red card for his goalkeeping against an opposition free kick taken quickly. Bakambu scored the equalizing penalty in the 73rd minute.

=== September ===
On 1 September, Guoan won 5–2 against Chongqing Lifan with Bakambu scoring four and Wang Ziming netting the other, ending Guoan's three-game winless streak. Chinese FA announced the dates to CSL championship stage and Chinese FA Cup matches on 2 September. Guoan is drawn against Qingdao Huanghai in the FA Cup and the match is set to take place on 19 September. 6 September saw Guoan concede two after leading through goals from Bakambu and Zhang Yuning, resulting in a 2–2 draw against Wuhan Zall. Guoan kept its first clean sheet in eight rounds in the 10 September match against Tianjin TEDA, winning 2–0 as Zhang Yuning and Augusto netted ond in each half. On 15 September, Guoan signed Bosnian center back Toni Šunjić from Russian club Dynamo Moscow. On the same day, Guoan led Hebei China Fortune 3–1 at the 88th minute with goals from Augusto, Bakambu and A Lan, but only managed to produce a 3–3 draw at the final whistle.

On 19 September, Guoan played Qingdao Huanghai in the first round of the Chinese FA Cup. Cléo scored the opener in the 31st minute for Huanghai from a foul that resulted in a penalty. A Lan failed to convert the penalty from an opposition handball in the box but managed to score the rebound, tying the game just before halftime. A Lan scored a header in the 69th minute to put Guoan in the lead. Zou Dehai secured Guoan's win when he held onto Cléo penalty in the 91st minute. Guoan advances to the next round with a result of 2–1.

22 September saw Guoan win 5–1 against Qingdao Huanghai in the CSL. Viera scored two with Yu Yang, Fernando and Bakambu each netting one. With the win, Guoan secured its place in the league's Championship Stage two matchdays in advance as it became mathematically impossible for the team to fall outside of fourth place within its Qualification Stage group. On 25 September, Guoan lost 0–1 to Shanghai SIPG, a loss which made Guoan mathematically impossible to win in group B of the CSL group stage. The Guoan side was not satisfied with the match result and claimed foul play from the referee. Guoan finished the group stage with a 4–0 win against Shijiazhuang Ever Bright. Two goals from Fernando and a goal each from Bakambu and Ba Dun helped seal the victory. A short holiday commenced for the players until 11 October.

On 30 September, Guoan announced that new signing Toni Šunjić would be loaned out to Henan Jianye for the remainder of the season due to registration regulations of the CSL.

=== October ===
Guoan regrouped in Beijing on 7 October and player a friendly against Beijing Institute of Technology F.C. on 10 October, which Guoan won 7–1. Guoan headed for Suzhou for the CSL championship stage on 11 October.

Guoan's first game in the championship stage, which sees the top 8 teams from the qualification stage play two-leg elimination matches until the final winner is determined, was played on 17 October against Shandong Luneng. Guoan conceded twice in the first half, but managed to tie the game thanks to Bakambu converting a penalty in the 49th minute and then scoring a header off of Li Lei's cross in the 69th minute. The first leg ended 2–2. Bakambu, with the double, became Guoan's all-time top scorer in the top flight Chinese football with 44 goals, overtaking teammate Zhang Xizhe's 43 goals for the club.

Guoan played its second leg against Shandong Luneng, which was also the 900th competitive match in club history, on 22 October. Despite conceding in the 15th minute, Zhang Yuning scored twice in the 19th and 75th minute, leading a successful Guoan comeback and securing progression to the semi-finals of the championship stage, pitting Guoan against Guangzhou Evergrande. Zhang's first goal was also the 1400th goal in club history.

On 28 October, Guoan player the first leg of its semi-final in the CSL championship stage against Guangzhou Evergrande. Jin Taiyan deputized at left-back for the injured Li Lei. Both Augusto and Bakambu hit the woodwork in the first half, and Guangzhou Evergrande hit the woodwork twice during the match as well. However, neither team was able to score, and the game ended in a 0–0 tie.

=== November ===
On 2 November, Guoan played Guangzhou Evergrande in the second leg of the CSL championship stage semi-finals. In the 39th minute following a Guangzhou corner, Zhang Yuning was judged by the referee to have committed a foul in the penalty area, leading to an opposition penalty which Talisca converted. Before the halftime whistle blew, Wang Gang went to ground in Guangzhou's penalty area, but the Korean referee Kim Hee-gon deemed that there was no foul. In the second half, Guangzhou scored a second in the 56th minute before Zhang Yuning was able to pull one back for Guoan off of a Li Lei cross in the 61st minute. However, Guangzhou managed to score again in the 81st minute, handing Guoan a 3–1 loss and thus eliminating the team from champion contention.

7 November saw Guoan play against Shanghai SIPG to determine the final league table in the first leg of a two-leg 3rd and 4th place play-off. Wang Gang fought his way through inside the penalty box after Zhang Xizhe's long cross-field pass found him, and fed Bakambu for the Guoan lead in the 26th minute. In the second half, Chi Zhongguo tapped in Guoan's second of the day when the opposition goalie spilled A Lan's shot. Unfortunately in the 90th minute, an opposition shot came off the crossbar and bounced off of Guo Quanbo for an own goal. Guoan managed a 1–2 away win in the end.

On November 11, Guoan played Shanghai SIPG in the second leg of the third-place playoff. A Lan netted the bottom right corner of the goal off of a Zhang Yuning through ball in the 31st minute, only for opposition player to equalize two minutes after half-time. Hou Sen made a series of outstanding saves to deny Shanghai SIPG of further chances, and the game ended in a 1–1 draw. With Guoan leading the aggregated score 3–2, the team finished this season's CSL campaign in 3rd place, clinching a direct qualification to next season's AFC Champions League.

Guoan arrived in Doha, where all further AFC Champions League games for this season would be held, on 17 November. On 21 November, Guoan played its second game in the group stage against FC Seoul. Fernando opened the scoring for Guoan after only 8 minutes in this tightly contested match, and A Lan doubled Guoan's lead in the 60th minute through a shot outside the box. However, a handball from Kim Min-jae allowed the opponent to pull one back in the 66th minute. With no further goal scored, the game ended with a 2–1 victory for Guoan, elevating Guoan into first place in group E.

Guoan player its third game in the AFC Champions League group against Australian side Melbourne Victory on 24 October. Augusto opened the scoring for Guoan in the 22nd minute with A Lan scoring a header to increase the Guoan's lead in the 34th minute. Wang Ziming netted another in the 74th minute. Despite an opposition shot that ricocheted off Kim Min-jae landing in Guoan's goal, the game ended in a comfortable 3–1 victory for Guoan.

Guoan's fourth game in the group stage came on 27 November, when the team played its against Melbourne Victory again. Viera opened the game in just 9 minutes, putting the ball past the opposition goalkeeper from a Wang Gang cross. Zhang Yuning then netted in the 35th minute, turning and shooting from a Viera through ball. The game ended 0–2 for Guoan and with 4 consecutive wins Guoan qualified two games in advance for the Round of 16.

On 28 November, Guoan played in the second round of the Chinese FA Cup against Chengdu Better City. As the first team was in Doha competing in the AFC Champions League, Guoan had to utilize its reserve team and named a starting lineup with an average age of just 19.19 years. In the 8th minute of the game, Ling Zhongyang floated a cross into the box, and with Li Boxi as a dummy attracting the attention of the opposition defender, Xie Longfei was able to produce a clean finish giving Guoan the 1–0 lead. After two red cards for the opposition and five yellows for Guoan, the lead held and Guoan advanced to the quarter-finals 1–0 to play Wuhan Zall.

30 November saw Guoan win its fifth straight group stage game in the AFC Champions League against FC Seoul. Viera struck first in the 23rd minute with a curling free kick beyond the goalkeeper. Augusto added to the tally just before half-time, side volleying home a Wang Gang cross. Opposition striker scored in the 89th minute, but Zhang Yuning sealed the game in the 93rd as he rounded the goalkeeper and put the ball into the empty net. The 3–1 victory put Guoan's group stage talley at 15 points and guaranteed Guoan's first place in Group E.

=== December ===
Guoan and its reserve team continued the journey in the Chinese FA Cup on 2 December, playing against Wuhan Zall. Guoan conceded in the 4th minute as goalie Ma Kunyue hesitated and had the ball taken from him within his own penalty area. Guoan fell two goals behind in the 12th minute as Ma Kunyue and Ling Zhongyang miscommunicated, allowing opposition striker to gain possession within Guoan's own penalty area. A counterattack by Wuhan in the 38th minute led to Guoan conceding a third goal. The game ended 0–3 to Wuhan, and Guoan was thus knocked out of the competition.

Guoan played its last group stage game in the AFC Champions League on 3 December against Chiangrai United. Guoan fell behind in the 55th minute, but A Lan came on and headed in a goal in the 76th minute to draw Guoan level. Guoan had the chance to win the game in stoppage time when a penalty was given against the opposition, but A Lan hit the post with his shot. The game ended 1–1, and Guoan will play FC Tokyo next in the round of 16.

Guoan faced round of 16 opponent FC Tokyo on 6 December. After a lackluster first half, A Lan power in a goal in the penalty box from an Augusto pass. Guoan held on to the lead and the game ended 1–0, with Guoan advancing to the quarter-finals. Guoan drew against Ulsan Hyundai in the quarter-finals.

On 10 December, Guoan played against Ulsan Hyundai in the quarter-finals. Conceding a penalty and a goal, Guoan lost the game 0–2 and is thus eliminated from the competition.

== Players ==
As of 30 September 2020

Note: Flags indicate national team as defined under FIFA eligibility rules; some limited exceptions apply. Players may hold more than one non-FIFA nationality.

No.	Pos.	Nation	Player
1	GK	CHN	Hou Sen
2	DF	KOR	Kim Min-jae
3	DF	CHN	Yu Yang
4	DF	CHN	Li Lei
5	MF	BRA	Renato Augusto (vice-captain)
6	MF	CHN	Chi Zhongguo
7	MF	CHN	Hou Yongyong (Note: Upon joining the club, player became naturalized Chinese citizen)
8	MF	CHN	Piao Cheng
9	FW	CHN	Zhang Yuning
10	MF	CHN	Zhang Xizhe
11	MF	BRA	Fernando
14	GK	CHN	Zou Dehai
16	DF	CHN	Jin Pengxiang
17	FW	COD	Cédric Bakambu
18	DF	CHN	Jin Taiyan

No.	Pos.	Nation	Player
19	FW	CHN	A Lan (Note: The player opted to become naturalized Chinese citizen after having played in China since January 2015)
20	FW	CHN	Wang Ziming
21	MF	ESP	Jonathan Viera
22	DF	CHN	Yu Dabao (Captain)
23	MF	CHN	Li Ke
24	DF	CHN	Yang Fan
25	GK	CHN	Guo Quanbo
26	MF	CHN	Lü Peng
27	FW	CHN	Wang Gang
28	DF	CHN	Jiang Tao
29	MF	CHN	Ba Dun
32	MF	CHN	Liu Guobo
39	FW	CHN	Wen Da
41	GK	CHN	Ma Kunyue

== Transfers ==
=== In ===
#	Position	Nationality	Name	Age	Moving from	Type	Transfer Window	Ends	Fee	Source
21	MF	(Spain)	Jonathan Viera	30	(Spain) Las Palmas	End of Loan	Winter	2021	Free	
	GK	(China)	Chi Wenyi	31	Hebei China Fortune	End of Loan	Winter	2021	Free	
16	DF	(China)	Jin Pengxiang	29	(China) Guangzhou R&F	End of Loan	Winter	2020	Free	
11	MF	(Brazil)	Fernando	27	(Russia) Spartak Moscow	Transfer	Winter		Undisclosed	
24	DF	(China)	Yang Fan	23	(China) Tianjin TEDA	Transfer	Winter	2023	¥20M and Swap deal (with Lei Tenglong)	
19	FW	(China)	A Lan	30	(China) Guangzhou Evergrande	Loan	Winter	2021	Free	
	DF	(Bosnia and Herzegovina)	Toni Šunjić	31	(Russia) Dynamo Moscow	Transfer	Summer	2022	¥2.8M	

=== Out ===
#	Position	Nationality	Name	Age	Moving to	Type	Transfer Window	Fee	Source
15	DF	(China)	Liu Huan	30	(China) Chongqing Lifan	Loan	Winter	Free	
22	GK	(China)	Yang Zhi	36		End of Contract	Winter		
24	DF	(China)	Zhang Yu	25	(China) Changchun Yatai	Loan	Winter	¥1M	
30	DF	(China)	Lei Tenglong	28	(China) Tianjin TEDA	Transfer	Winter	¥20M and Swap deal (with Yang Fan)	
57	FW	(China)	Hu Yanqiang	26			Winter		
	GK	(China)	Chi Wenyi	31	Hebei China Fortune	Transfer	Summer	¥10M	
	DF	(Bosnia and Herzegovina)	Toni Šunjić	31	(China) Henan Jianye	Loan	Summer	Free	

== Friendlies ==
14 January 2020 Friendly	AFE Trial Team (Spain)	0–1	Beijing Sinobo Guoan	Murcia, Spain
			Augusto	Stadium: La Finca Resort

18 January 2020 Friendly	1. FC Heidenheim (Germany)	5–2	Beijing Sinobo Guoan	Murcia, Spain
	Kleindienst 15'; Kerschbaumer 21'; Schimmer 68'; Feick 74'; Otto 89'	Report	Augusto 50', 70'	Stadium: La Finca Resort

16 May 2020 Friendly	Beijing Sinobo Guoan	2–0	(China) Beijing Renhe	Beijing, China
	Zhang Yuning; Wang Ziming

22 May 2020 Friendly	Beijing Sinobo Guoan	0–2	(China) Beijing Renhe	Beijing, China
			Yu Wenhe; Nizamdin

5 June 2020 Friendly	Beijing Sinobo Guoan	5–0	(China) Tianjin TEDA	Beijing, China
	Wang Ziming 23'; A Lan 29' (pen.), 45'; Zhang Yuning 62'; Jin Pengxiang 77'

26 June 2020 Friendly	Beijing Sinobo Guoan	4–3	(China) Beijing BSU	Xianghe, Hebei, China
	Piao Cheng; Zhang Xizhe; Wang Ziming		Yan Xiangchuang; Meng Zhen; Huang Wei

4 July 2020 Friendly	Beijing Sinobo Guoan	1–0	(China) Zhejiang Greentown	Shanghai, China
	A Lan

8 July 2020 Friendly	Beijing Sinobo Guoan	1–4	(China) Nantong Zhiyun	Shanghai, China
	A Lan (pen.)		Xu Junmin; Ma Li; Silva; Fei Yu

11 July 2020 Friendly	Beijing Sinobo Guoan	6–1	(China) Shanghai Jiading Boji	Shanghai, China
	A Lan; Zhang Yuning (pen.); Wang Ziming Ba Dun

14 July 2020 Friendly	Beijing Sinobo Guoan	2–0	(China) Zhejiang Greentown	Shanghai, China
	A Lan (pen.); Bakambu

17 July 2020 Friendly	Beijing Sinobo Guoan	1–0	(China) Shanghai Greenland Shenhua	Shanghai, China
19:00 UTC+8	Hou Yongyong 70'			Stadium: Hongkou Football Stadium

10 October 2020 Friendly	Beijing Sinobo Guoan	7–1	(China) Beijing Institute of Technology	Beijing, China

== Competitions ==
=== Overview ===
Competition	First match	Last match	Starting round	Final position	Record							
Competition	First match	Last match	Starting round	Final position	Pld	W	D	L	GF	GA	GD	Win %
Chinese Super League	26 July 2020	12 November 2020	Group stage	3rd	20	10	7	3	44	27	+17	50.00
Chinese FA Cup	19 September 2020	2 December 2020	First round	Quarter-finals	3	2	0	1	3	4	−1	66.67
AFC Champions League	18 February 2020	10 December 220	Group stage	Quarter-finals	8	6	1	1	13	6	+7	75.00
Total					31	18	8	5	60	37	+23	58.06

Last updated: 10 December 2020
Source: Soccerway

=== Chinese Super League ===
On 1 July, Chinese Football Association announced that the season would resume on 25 July and 16 teams would be split into two groups competing respectively in Dalian and Suzhou. Guoan is placed into Group B. The first four places of each group would enter the Championship stage to compete for the overall league winner, and the bottom four places of each group would enter the Relegation stage, through which three relegation teams would be determined. The Championship and Relegation stage consists of three rounds of home and away games against different opponents to determine the final league ranking.

==== Results summary ====
Overall								Home						Away					
Pld	W	D	L	GF	GA	GD	Pts	W	D	L	GF	GA	GD	W	D	L	GF	GA	GD
20	10	7	3	44	27	+17	37	7	2	1	24	8	+16	3	5	2	20	19	+1

Last updated: 11 November 2020.

==== Qualification stage ====
===== Group B League table =====
Pos	Team	Pld	W	D	L	GF	GA	GD	Pts	Qualification or relegation
1	Shanghai SIPG (Q)	14	10	2	2	26	11	+15	32	Qualification for Championship stage
2	Beijing Sinobo Guoan (Q)	14	8	4	2	36	19	+17	28	Qualification for Championship stage
3	Chongqing Dangdai Lifan (Q)	14	7	3	4	22	19	+3	24 (Note: Head-to-head results: Chongqing Dangdai Lifan 3–1 Hebei China Fortune, Hebei China Fortune 2–2 Chongqing Dangdai Lifan)	Qualification for Championship stage
4	Hebei China Fortune (Q)	14	7	3	4	25	23	+2	24	Qualification for Championship stage
5	Wuhan Zall (Q)	14	5	2	7	16	16	0	17 (Note: Head-to-head results: Shijiazhuang Ever Bright 1–0 Wuhan Zall, Wuhan Zall 2–1 Shijiazhuang Ever Bright)	Qualification for Relegation stage

Source: CSL
Rules for classification:
- During season: 1) Points; 2) Goal difference; 3) Goals scored.
- After season: 1) Points; 2) Head-to-head points; 3) Head-to-head goal difference; 4) Head-to-head goals scored; 5) Scores of the weight ratio of the reserve league and youth leagues.
  (Q) Qualified for the phase indicated
  Notes:

===== Results by round =====
Round	1	2	3	4	5	6	7	8	9	10	11	12	13	14
Ground	A	H	A	H	A	H	A	H	A	H	A	H	A	H
Result	W	W	W	W	D	L	D	W	D	W	D	W	L	W
Position	3	2	1	1	1	2	2	2	2	2	2	2	2	2

Source: Competitive matches
A = Away; H = Home; W = Win; D = Draw; L = Loss

===== Matches =====
26 July 2020 1	Chongqing Dangdai Lifan	1–2	Beijing Sinobo Guoan	Suzhou
20:00 UTC+8	Chen Jie (yellow card) 22'; Liu Le (yellow card) 25'; Yu Dabao 80' (o.g.); Yang Shuai (yellow card) 90+3'		Wang Gang (yellow card) 20'; Yang Fan (red card) 25'; Li Lei 50'; Piao Cheng 66'; Li Ke (yellow card) 88'	Stadium: Suzhou Sports Center; Attendance: 0 Referee: Shen Yinhao
Note: The match was played behind closed doors due to the COVID-19 pandemic.

1 August 2020 2	Beijing Sinobo Guoan	1–0	Wuhan Zall	Suzhou
18:00 UTC+8	Viera 3'; Zhang Xizhe (yellow card) 10'; Li Ke (yellow card) 31'		Liu Yi (yellow card) 81'	Stadium: Suzhou Sports Center; Attendance: 0 Referee: Ma Ning
Note: The match was played behind closed doors due to the COVID-19 pandemic.

6 August 2020 3	Tianjin TEDA	1–3	Beijing Sinobo Guoan	Suzhou
18:00 UTC+8	Rong Hao 61'		A Lan 39'; Yu Dabao (yellow card) 45'; Zhang Xizhe 77', (yellow card) 91'; Lan Jingxuan 90' (o.g.)	Stadium: Suzhou Olympic Sports Centre; Attendance: 0 Referee: Shi Zhenlu
Note: The match was played behind closed doors due to the COVID-19 pandemic.

12 August 2020 4	Beijing Sinobo Guoan	3–1	Hebei China Fortune	Suzhou
20:00 UTC+8	Jin Taiyan 5'; Wang Gang (yellow card) 19'; Zhang Yuning 54'; Hou Yongyong 90+3'		Ding Haifeng (yellow card) 73'; Dong Xuesheng 78'; Wang Qiuming (yellow card) 88'	Stadium: Suzhou Sports Center; Attendance: 0 Referee: Shen Yinhao
Note: The match was played behind closed doors due to the COVID-19 pandemic.

16 August 2020 5	Qingdao Huanghai	3–3	Beijing Sinobo Guoan	Kunshan
18:00 UTC+8	Alessandrini 41' (pen.), 72'; Zhu Jianrong 45'; Shi Zhe (yellow card) 85'		Bakambu 18'; A Lan 22'; Hou Yongyong 30'	Stadium: Kunshan Sports Centre Stadium; Attendance: 0 Referee: Shi Zhenlu
Note: The match was played behind closed doors due to the COVID-19 pandemic.

22 August 2020 6	Beijing Sinobo Guoan	1–2	Shanghai SIPG	Suzhou
20:00 UTC+8	Bakambu 14'; Wang Gang (yellow card) 24'; Yu Dabao (yellow card) 67'		Fu Huan (yellow card) 16'; Wang Shenchao 27'; Chen Binbin (yellow card) 40'; Yang Shiyuan (yellow card) 57'; Oscar 76'; Arnautović (yellow card) 86'	Stadium: Suzhou Olympic Sports Centre; Attendance: 1,588; Referee: Ma Ning
Note: The match was the first in the current Chinese Super League season to allow general public entrance after the COVID-19 pandemic. Attendance was limited.

27 August 2020 7	Shijiazhuang Ever Bright	2–2	Beijing Sinobo Guoan	Suzhou
18:00 UTC+8	Muriqui 34'; Sunzu (yellow card) 47', (goal) 64'		A Lan 24'; Guo Quanbo (red card) 40'; Lü Peng (yellow card) 62'; Bakambu 73' (pen.)	Stadium: Suzhou Sports Center; Attendance: 0 Referee: Jin Jingyuan
Note: The match was played behind closed doors due to the COVID-19 pandemic.

1 September 2020 8	Beijing Sinobo Guoan	5–2	Chongqing Dangdai Lifan	Kunshan
20:00 UTC+8	Bakambu 13', 43', 48', 62'; Wang Ziming 46'; Yu Yang (yellow card) 69'; Fernando (yellow card) 76'		Kardec 45+1'; Fernandinho 90+1' (pen.)	Stadium: Kunshan Sports Centre Stadium; Attendance: 742; Referee: Liang Caiwei
Note: Attendance was limited due to the COVID-19 pandemic.

6 September 2020 9	Wuhan Zall	2–2	Beijing Sinobo Guoan	Suzhou
20:00 UTC+8	Baptistão 63', (yellow card) 90+1'; Kouassi 69'; Zhang Chenglin (yellow card) 90+4'		Bakambu 23'; Zhang Yuning 45'	Stadium: Suzhou Olympic Sports Centre; Attendance: 985; Referee: Li Haixin
Note: Attendance was limited due to the COVID-19 pandemic.

10 September 2020 10	Beijing Sinobo Guoan	2–0	Tianjin TEDA	Suzhou
18:00 UTC+8	Li Ke (yellow card) 23'; Zhang Yuning 30'; Jin Taiyan (yellow card) 44'; Augusto 47'		Liu Ruofan (yellow card) 62'; Zhao Honglüe (yellow card) 63'; Song Yue (yellow card) 68'	Stadium: Suzhou Olympic Sports Centre; Attendance: 0 Referee: Zhang Lei
Note: The match was played behind closed doors due to the COVID-19 pandemic.

15 September 2020 11	Hebei China Fortune	3–3	Beijing Sinobo Guoan	Suzhou
20:00 UTC+8	Gao Late 10'; Tuary (yellow card) 40'; Luo Senwen (yellow card) 79'; Zhang Chengdong 90+1'; Marcão 90+8' (pen.)		Chi Zhongguo (yellow card) 24'; Augusto 26'; Bakambu 45+1'; Li Ke (yellow card) 53'; A Lan 88'; Viera (yellow card) 90+8'	Stadium: Suzhou Sports Center; Attendance: 0 Referee: Jin Jingyuan
Note: The match was played behind closed doors due to the COVID-19 pandemic.

22 September 2020 12	Beijing Sinobo Guoan	5–1	Qingdao Huanghai	Kunshan
15:30 UTC+8	Yu Yang 14'; Zhang Xizhe (yellow card) 15'; Viera 38', 56'; Fernando 45+1'; Bakambu 85'		Yaki Yen (yellow card) 36' (yellow-red card) 53'; Yang Yu (yellow card) 39'; Gao Xiang (yellow card) 64'; Denis Popović 90+1' (pen.)	Stadium: Kunshan Sports Centre Stadium; Attendance: 0 Referee: Li Haixin
Note: The match was played behind closed doors due to the COVID-19 pandemic.

25 September 2020 13	Shanghai SIPG	1–0	Beijing Sinobo Guoan	Suzhou
20:00 UTC+8	Lopes (yellow card) 20'; Yang Shiyuan (yellow card) 36'; Hulk 44' (pen.); Fu Huan (yellow card) 79'; Li Shenglong (yellow card) 90+1'		Yu Yang (yellow card) 43'; Li Ke (yellow card) 43'; Chi Zhongguo (yellow card) 45'	Stadium: Suzhou Olympic Sports Centre; Attendance: 0 Referee: Zhang Lei
Note: The match was played behind closed doors due to the COVID-19 pandemic.

28 September 2020 14	Beijing Sinobo Guoan	4–0	Shijiazhuang Ever Bright	Kunshan
15:30 UTC+8	Fernando 17', 75'; Bakambu 28'; Ba Dun 90+1'		Chen Zitong (yellow card) 32'	Stadium: Kunshan Sports Centre Stadium; Attendance: 0 Referee: Shen Yinhao
Note: The match was played behind closed doors due to the COVID-19 pandemic.

==== Championship Stage ====
The championship stage consists of the top 8 teams from the qualification stage. Teams play two-leg elimination matches until the final winner is determined.

===== Matches =====
17 October 2020 Quarter-finals, First leg	Shandong Luneng Taishan	2–2	Beijing Sinobo Guoan	Suzhou
15:30 UTC+8	Pellè 25' (pen.); Jin Jingdao 37' (yellow card) 56'; Fellaini (yellow card) 45+2'; Kádár (yellow card) 72'; Huang Cong (yellow card) 90+2'		Viera (yellow card) 25'; Bakambu 49' (pen.), 69'	Stadium: Suzhou Sports Center; Attendance: 2,758; Referee: Shen Yinhao
Note: Attendance was limited due to the COVID-19 pandemic.

22 October 2020 Quarter-finals, Second leg	Beijing Sinobo Guoan	2–1 (4–3 agg.)	Shandong Luneng Taishan	Suzhou
19:35 UTC+8	Zhang Yuning 19', 75'; Yu Yang (yellow card) 82'; Bakambu (yellow card) 88'; Jin Taiyan (yellow card) 90+8'		Moisés 15'; Jin Jingdao (yellow card) 23'; Dai Lin (yellow card) 79'; Liu Junshuai (yellow card) 82'	Stadium: Suzhou Sports Center; Attendance: 2,136; Referee: Kim Hee-gon (South Korea)
Note: Attendance was limited due to the COVID-19 pandemic.

28 October 2020 Semi-finals, First leg	Beijing Sinobo Guoan	0–0	Guangzhou Evergrande Taobao	Suzhou
19:35 UTC+8	Viera (yellow card) 39'; Jin Taiyan (yellow card) 72'		Zheng Zhi (yellow card) 4'; Yang Liyu (yellow card) 78'	Stadium: Suzhou Sports Center; Attendance: 1,785; Referee: Ko Hyung-jin (South Korea)
Note: Attendance was limited due to the COVID-19 pandemic.

2 November 2020 Semi-finals, Second leg	Guangzhou Evergrande Taobao	3–1 (1–3 agg.)	Beijing Sinobo Guoan	Suzhou
19:35 UTC+8	Wei Shihao (yellow card) 30'; Park Ji-soo (yellow card) 31'; Talisca 39' (pen.); He Chao (yellow card) 41'; Paulinho 56', 81'; Wu Shaocong (yellow card) 68'; Zhang Xiuwei (yellow card) 85'; Liu Dianzuo (yellow card) 91'		Li Lei (yellow card) 85'; Zhang Yuning 61'	Stadium: Suzhou Olympic Sports Centre; Attendance: 2,849; Referee: Kim Hee-gon (South Korea)
Note: Attendance was limited due to the COVID-19 pandemic.

7 November 2020 3rd–4th place playoffs, First leg	Shanghai SIPG	1–2	Beijing Sinobo Guoan	Suzhou
19:35 UTC+8	Yang Shiyuan (yellow card) 38'; Wang Shenchao (yellow card) 65'; Lin Chuangyi (yellow card) 86'; Guo Quanbo 90' (o.g.)		Bakambu 26'; Chi Zhongguo 51'; Fernando (yellow card) 79'	Stadium: Suzhou Sports Center; Attendance: 1,066; Referee: Ko Hyung-jin (South Korea)
Note: Attendance was limited due to the COVID-19 pandemic.

11 November 2020 3rd–4th place playoffs, Second leg	Beijing Sinobo Guoan	1–1 (3–2 agg.)	Shanghai SIPG	Suzhou
19:35 UTC+8	Yu Yang (yellow card) 26'; A Lan 31'; Li Lei (yellow card) 70'; Fernando (yellow card) 87'		Lopes 47'; Fu Huan (yellow card) 59'	Stadium: Suzhou Sports Center; Referee: Guo Baolong
Note: Attendance was limited due to the COVID-19 pandemic.

=== Chinese FA Cup ===
Beijing Guoan joined the competition in the first round.

19 September 2020 First round	Beijing Sinobo Guoan	2–1	Qingdao Huanghai	Suzhou
19:35 UTC+8	Jiang Tao (yellow card) 14'; A Lan 45+2' (pen.), 69'		Cléo (yellow card) 15', (goal) 31' (pen.); Jiang Weipeng (yellow card) 45+2' (yellow-red card) 87'; Yan Zihao (yellow card) 69'	Stadium: Suzhou Sports Center; Attendance: 0 Referee: Ma Ning
Note: The match was played behind closed doors due to the COVID-19 pandemic.

28 November 2020 Second round	Beijing Sinobo Guoan	1–0	Chengdu Better City	Changzhou
19:35 UTC+8	Xie Longfei 8'; Xu Dongdong (yellow card) 41'; Jiang Wenhao (yellow card) 49'; Shi Yucheng (yellow card) 57'; Li Jingrun (yellow card) 80'; Chen Huaiyuan (yellow card) 90+1'		Hu Yongfa (red card) 32'; Chu Jinzhao (red card) 90+3'	Stadium: Changzhou Olympic Sports Centre; Referee: Ma Ning

2 December 2020 Quarter-finals	Beijing Sinobo Guoan	0–3	Wuhan Zall	Kunshan
15:00 UTC+8			Hu Jinghang 4'; Dong Xuesheng 12'; Chen Ao (yellow card) 35'; Jiang Zilei 38'	Stadium: Kunshan Sports Centre Stadium; Referee: Dai Yige

=== AFC Champions League ===
Beijing Guoan joined the competition in the group stage.

==== Group stage ====
Pos	Team	Pld	W	D	L	GF	GA	GD	Pts	Qualification	BEI	MVC	SEO	CHI
1	(China) Beijing Guoan	6	5	1	0	12	4	+8	16	Advance to knockout stage	—	3–1	3–1	1–1
2	(Australia) Melbourne Victory	6	2	1	3	6	9	−3	7	Advance to knockout stage	0–2	—	2–1	1–0
3	(South Korea) FC Seoul	6	2	0	4	10	9	+1	6		1–2	1–0	—	5–0
4	(Thailand) Chiangrai United	6	1	2	3	5	11	−6	5		0–1	2–2	2–1	—

Source: AFC
Rules for classification: Tiebreakers

18 February 2020 2	Chiangrai United (Thailand)	0–1	(China) Beijing Sinobo Guoan	Chiang Rai, Thailand
19:00 UTC+7	Inpaen (yellow card) 55'; Bill (yellow card) 68'	Live Report; Stats Report	Wang Ziming 23'; Li Ke (yellow card) 40'; Jiang Tao (yellow card) 59'	Stadium: Singha Stadium; Attendance: 5,229; Referee: Hanna Hattab (Syria)

21 November 2020 1	FC Seoul (South Korea)	1–2	(China) Beijing Sinobo Guoan	Doha, Qatar
13:00 UTC+3	Kim Won-sik (yellow card) 36'; Osmar (yellow card) 53'; Park Chu-young 66' (pen.); Lee In-gyu (yellow card) 90+2'	Report	Fernando 8'; A Lan 60'	Stadium: Education City Stadium; Attendance: 0 Referee: Turki Al-Khudhayr (Saudi Arabia)
Note: The match was played behind closed doors due to the COVID-19 pandemic.

24 November 2020 3	Beijing Sinobo Guoan (China)	3–1	(Australia) Melbourne Victory	Doha, Qatar
13:00 UTC+3	Augusto 22'; A Lan 34'; Li Ke (yellow card) 44'; Wang Ziming 74'; Chi Zhongguo (yellow card) 90+1'	Report	McManaman (yellow card) 28'; Iannucci 78'	Stadium: Jassim bin Hamad Stadium; Attendance: 0 Referee: Saoud Al-Athbah (Qatar)
Note: The match was played behind closed doors due to the COVID-19 pandemic.

27 November 2020 4	Melbourne Victory (Australia)	0–2	(China) Beijing Sinobo Guoan	Doha, Qatar
13:00 UTC+3	Traoré (yellow card) 37'; Ansell (yellow card) 40'; Broxham (yellow card) 63'; Anderson (yellow card) 74'; Ryan (yellow card) 89'	Report	Viera 9'; Zhang Yuning 35'; Wang Gang (yellow card) 50'	Stadium: Jassim bin Hamad Stadium; Attendance: 0 Referee: Mohd Amirul Izwan Yaacob (Malaysia)
Note: The match was played behind closed doors due to the COVID-19 pandemic.

30 November 2020 5	Beijing Sinobo Guoan (China)	3–1	(South Korea) FC Seoul	Doha, Qatar
13:00 UTC+3	Viera 23'; Augusto 43'; Wang Ziming (yellow card) 59'; Chi Zhongguo (yellow card) 90'; Zhang Yuning 90+3'	Report	Kim Won-gun (yellow card) 48'; Ko Kwang-min (yellow card) 84'; Cha Oh-yeon (yellow card) 86'; Yun Ju-tae 89'	Stadium: Jassim bin Hamad Stadium; Attendance: 0 Referee: Muhammad Taqi (Singapore)
Note: The match was played behind closed doors due to the COVID-19 pandemic.

3 December 2020 6	Beijing Sinobo Guoan (China)	1–1	(Thailand) Chiangrai United	Doha, Qatar
16:00 UTC+3	Yang Fan (yellow card) 25'; Yu Dabao (yellow card) 52'; A Lan 76'	Report	Bill (yellow card) 25'; Tiatrakul (yellow card) 39'; Panya 55'; Srisai (yellow card) 57'	Stadium: Jassim bin Hamad Stadium; Attendance: 0 Referee: Hussein Abo Yehia (Lebanon)
Note: The match was played behind closed doors due to the COVID-19 pandemic.

==== Knockout stage ====
6 December 2020 Round of 16	Beijing Sinobo Guoan (China)	1–0	(Japan) FC Tokyo	Doha, Qatar
13:00 UTC+3	A Lan (yellow card) 40' (goal) 59'; Li Lei (yellow card) 44'; Zhang Yuning (yellow card) 84'	Report	Oumari (yellow card) 42'	Stadium: Education City Stadium; Attendance: 0 Referee: Alireza Faghani (Iran)
Note: The match was played behind closed doors due to the COVID-19 pandemic.

10 December 2020 Quarter-finals	Ulsan Hyundai (South Korea)	2–0	(China) Beijing Sinobo Guoan	Al Wakrah, Qatar
13:00 UTC+3	Lee Keun-ho (yellow card) 2'; Negrão 21' (pen.), 42'; Kim Tae-hwan (yellow card) 55'	Report	Kim Min-jae (yellow card) 20'; Wang Gang (yellow card) 57'	Stadium: Al Janoub Stadium; Attendance: 0 Referee: Mohammed Abdulla Hassan Mohamed (United Arab Emirates)
Note: The match was played behind closed doors due to the COVID-19 pandemic.

== Statistics ==
=== Appearances and goals ===
As of 10 December 2020

No.	Pos.	Nat.	Name	Chinese Super League		Chinese FA Cup		AFC Champions League		Total	
No.	Pos.	Nat.	Name	Apps	Goals	Apps	Goals	Apps	Goals	Apps	Goals
1	GK	CHN	Hou Sen	10(1)	0	0	0	7	0	17(1)	0
2	DF	KOR	Kim Min-jae	17	0	0	0	6	0	23	0
3	DF	CHN	Yu Yang	14(3)	1	0	0	5(1)	0	19(4)	1
4	DF	CHN	Li Lei	16(1)	1	0	0	6(1)	0	22(2)	1
5	MF	BRA	Renato Augusto	11(4)	2	0(1)	0	8	2	19(5)	4
6	MF	CHN	Chi Zhongguo	15(2)	1	0	0	5(2)	0	20(4)	1
7	MF	CHN	Hou Yongyong	3(5)	2	0	0	0	0	3(5)	2
8	MF	CHN	Piao Cheng	2	1	0	0	1	0	3	1
9	FW	CHN	Zhang Yuning	11(7)	6	0(1)	0	3(3)	2	14(11)	8
10	MF	CHN	Zhang Xizhe	12(7)	1	1	0	6(2)	0	19(9)	1
11	MF	BRA	Fernando	5(6)	3	1	0	6(1)	1	12(7)	4
14	GK	CHN	Zou Dehai	0	0	1	0	0	0	1	0
16	DF	CHN	Jin Pengxiang	0	0	1	0	0	0	1	0
17	FW	COD	Cédric Bakambu	17(2)	14	0	0	1	0	18(2)	14
18	DF	CHN	Jin Taiyan	6(3)	1	1	0	2(2)	0	9(5)	1
19	FW	CHN	A Lan	7(8)	5	1	2	4(2)	4	12(10)	11
20	FW	CHN	Wang Ziming	2(13)	1	1	0	2(4)	2	5(17)	3
21	MF	ESP	Jonathan Viera	16(2)	3	0(1)	0	6(2)	2	22(5)	5
22	DF	CHN	Yu Dabao	7(4)	0	0	0	3(1)	0	10(5)	0
23	MF	CHN	Li Ke	15(1)	0	0(1)	0	3(2)	0	18(4)	0
24	DF	CHN	Yang Fan	4(2)	0	1	0	3(1)	0	8(3)	0
25	GK	CHN	Guo Quanbo	10(2)	0	0	0	1	0	11(2)	0
26	MF	CHN	Lü Peng	2(5)	0	1	0	1(4)	0	4(9)	0
27	FW	CHN	Wang Gang	18	0	0(1)	0	6	0	24(1)	0
28	DF	CHN	Jiang Tao	0(3)	0	1	0	2(1)	0	3(4)	0
29	MF	CHN	Ba Dun	0(3)	1	0	0	1(4)	0	1(7)	1
32	MF	CHN	Liu Guobo	0(2)	0	1	0	0	0	1(2)	0
39	FW	CHN	Wen Da	0(1)	0	0	0	0	0	0(1)	0
41	GK	CHN	Ma Kunyue (Note: Player is from the reserve team)	0	0	2	0	0	0	2	0
42	MF	CHN	Shi Yucheng	0	0	2	0	0	0	2	0
43	MF	CHN	Xie Longfei	0	0	2	1	0	0	2	1
44	GK	CHN	Wu Xiaopeng	0	0	0	0	0	0	0	0
45	DF	CHN	Jiang Wenhao	0	0	2	0	0	0	2	0
46	MF	CHN	Chen Yanpu	0	0	2	0	0	0	2	0
47	FW	CHN	Gao Jian	0	0	0(2)	0	0	0	0(2)	0
48	FW	CHN	Bai Yunfei	0	0	2	0	0	0	2	0
49	DF	CHN	Chen Huaiyuan	0	0	0(2)	0	0	0	0(2)	0
50	DF	CHN	Xu Dongdong	0	0	2	0	0	0	2	0
51	MF	CHN	Shao Tianfa	0	0	0(1)	0	0	0	0(1)	0
52	FW	CHN	Li Boxi	0	0	2	0	0	0	2	0
53	DF	CHN	Li Jingrun	0	0	2	0	0	0	2	0
54	DF	CHN	Ling Zhongyang	0	0	2	0	0	0	2	0
55	MF	CHN	Ma Yujun	0	0	0(2)	0	0	0	0(2)	0
56	MF	CHN	Xu Xiangyu	0	0	0	0	0	0	0	0
57	MF	CHN	Zhou Wenfeng	0	0	0(1)	0	0	0	0(1)	0
58	DF	CHN	Mu Jiaxin	0	0	0	0	0	0	0	0
59	DF	CHN	He Xiaoqiang	0	0	2	0	0	0	2	0
60	GK	CHN	Ma Jiaxiang	0	0	0	0	0	0	0	0

=== Goals ===
As of 10 December 2020

Rank	Position	Name	Chinese Super League	Chinese FA Cup	AFC Champions League	Total
1	FW	(Democratic Republic of the Congo) Cédric Bakambu	14	0	0	14
2	FW	(China) A Lan	5	2	4	11
3	FW	(China) Zhang Yuning	6	0	2	8
4	MF	(Spain) Jonathan Viera	3	0	2	5
5	MF	(Brazil) Fernando	3	0	1	4
5	MF	(Brazil) Renato Augusto	2	0	2	4
6	FW	(China) Wang Ziming	1	0	2	3
7	MF	(China) Hou Yongyong	2	0	0	2
8	MF	(China) Piao Cheng	1	0	0	1
8	DF	(China) Li Lei	1	0	0	1
8	MF	(China) Zhang Xizhe	1	0	0	1
8	DF	(China) Jin Taiyan	1	0	0	1
8	DF	(China) Yu Yang	1	0	0	1
8	FW	(China) Ba Dun	1	0	0	1
8	MF	(China) Chi Zhongguo	1	0	0	1
8	MF	(China) Xie Longfei	0	1	0	1
Total			43	3	13	59

=== Assists ===
As of 10 December 2020

Rank	Position	Name	Chinese Super League	Chinese FA Cup	AFC Champions League	Total
1	MF	(Spain) Jonathan Viera	3	0	4	7
2	FW	(Democratic Republic of the Congo) Cédric Bakambu	6	0	0	6
2	MF	(Brazil) Renato Augusto	4	0	2	6
3	FW	(China) Zhang Yuning	4	0	1	5
3	DF	(China) Wang Gang	3	0	2	5
4	MF	(China) Zhang Xizhe	3	0	0	3
5	DF	(China) Jin Taiyan	1	1	0	2
5	DF	(China) Li Ke	2	0	0	2
5	DF	(China) Li Lei	2	0	0	2
6	DF	(China) Yu Dabao	1	0	0	1
6	FW	(China) Wang Ziming	1	0	0	1
6	MF	(Brazil) Fernando	0	0	1	1
6	FW	(China) Ba Dun	0	0	1	1
6	DF	(China) Ling Zhongyang	0	1	0	1
6	DF	(China) Yang Fan	0	0	1	1
Total			30	2	12	44

=== Clean sheets ===
As of 10 December 2020

Rank	Name	Chinese Super League	Chinese FA Cup	AFC Champions League	Total
1	(China) Hou Sen	3	0	3	6
2	(China) Guo Quanbo	1	0	0	1
2	(China) Ma Kunyue	0	1	0	1
Total		4	1	3	8

=== Disciplinary record ===
N	P	Nat.	Name	Chinese Super League			Chinese FA Cup			AFC Champions League			Total			Notes
N	P	Nat.	Name	Yellow card	Second yellow card	Red card	Yellow card	Second yellow card	Red card	Yellow card	Second yellow card	Red card	Yellow card	Second yellow card	Red card	Notes
23	MF	(China)	Li Ke	5						2			7			
28	DF	(China)	Jiang Tao				1			1			2			
27	DF	(China)	Wang Gang	3						2			5			
24	DF	(China)	Yang Fan			1				1			1		1	
10	MF	(China)	Zhang Xizhe	3									3			
22	DF	(China)	Yu Dabao	2						1			3			
25	GK	(China)	Guo Quanbo			1									1	
26	MF	(China)	Lü Peng	1									1			
3	DF	(China)	Yu Yang	4									4			
11	MF	(Brazil)	Fernando	3									3			
18	DF	(China)	Jin Taiyan	3									3			
6	MF	(China)	Chi Zhongguo	2						2			4			
21	MF	(Spain)	Jonathan Viera	3									3			
17	ST	(Democratic Republic of the Congo)	Cédric Bakambu	1									1			
4	DF	(China)	Li Lei	2						1			3			
50	DF	(China)	Xu Dongdong				1						1			
45	DF	(China)	Jiang Wenhao				1						1			
42	MF	(China)	Shi Yucheng				1						1			
53	DF	(China)	Li Jingrun				1						1			
49	DF	(China)	Chen Huanyuan				1						1			
20	ST	(China)	Wang Ziming							1			1			
19	ST	(China)	A Lan							1			1			
9	ST	(China)	Zhang Yuning							1			1			
2	DF	(South Korea)	Kim Min-jae							1			1			

Last updated: 10 December 2020
Only competitive matches
(yellow card) = Number of bookings; (second yellow card) = Number of sending offs after a second yellow card; (red card) = Number of sending offs by a direct red card.
