= 2019 Beijing Sinobo Guoan F.C. season =

Beijing Sinobo Guoan
2019 season
- Chairman: Li Ming
- Manager: Roger Schmidt (until 31 July); Bruno Génésio (31 July–)
- Stadium: Workers Stadium
- Super League: 2nd
- FA Cup: Quarter-finals
- AFC Champions League: Group stage
- FA Super Cup: Runners-up
- Top goalscorer: League: Renato Augusto (15); All: Renato Augusto; Cédric Bakambu (16 each)
Home colours	Away colours

The 2019 Beijing Sinobo Guoan F.C. season is the team's 16th consecutive season in the Chinese Super League since the league's founding in the 2004, and 29th consecutive season in the top flight of Chinese football. They compete in the Chinese Super League, Chinese FA Cup, Chinese FA Super Cup and AFC Champions League. They qualified for the AFC Champions League for the first time since the 2015 season, but failed to advance from the group stage.

The team qualified for next year's AFC Champions League by securing at least a 2nd place finish in the Chinese Super League on November 26, 2019 after a 4-1 away victory against Guangzhou R&F. The team finished in 2nd place, scoring 70 points, the highest point tally in Guoan's history and as 2nd place in Chinese Super League.

== First team ==
As of 31 July 2019

Note: Flags indicate national team as defined under FIFA eligibility rules; some limited exceptions apply. Players may hold more than one non-FIFA nationality.

No.	Pos.	Nation	Player
1	GK	CHN	Hou Sen
2	DF	KOR	Kim Min-jae
3	DF	CHN	Yu Yang
4	DF	CHN	Li Lei
5	MF	BRA	Renato Augusto (vice-captain)
6	MF	CHN	Chi Zhongguo
7	MF	CHN	Hou Yongyong (Note: Upon joining the club, player became a naturalised Chinese citizen)
8	MF	CHN	Piao Cheng
9	FW	CHN	Zhang Yuning
10	MF	CHN	Zhang Xizhe
11	MF	BRA	Fernando (on loan from (Russia) Spartak Moscow)
14	GK	CHN	Zou Dehai
15	DF	CHN	Liu Huan
17	FW	COD	Cédric Bakambu
18	MF	CHN	Jin Taiyan

No.	Pos.	Nation	Player
19	FW	CHN	Yu Dabao (Captain)
20	FW	CHN	Wang Ziming
23	MF	CHN	Li Ke
24	DF	CHN	Zhang Yu
25	GK	CHN	Guo Quanbo
26	MF	CHN	Lü Peng
27	FW	CHN	Wang Gang
28	DF	CHN	Jiang Tao
29	MF	CHN	Ba Dun
30	DF	CHN	Lei Tenglong
31	DF	CHN	Liang Shaowen
32	MF	CHN	Liu Guobo
33	GK	CHN	Ma Kunyue
39	FW	CHN	Wen Da
57	MF	CHN	Hu Yanqiang

== Transfers ==
=== Winter ===
==== Transfers in ====
#	Position	Player	Transferred from	Fee	Date	Source
2	DF	(South Korea) Kim Min-jae	(South Korea) Jeonbuk Hyundai Motors	Undisclosed	29 January 2019	
7	MF	(Norway) Hou Yongyong	(Norway) Stabæk	Undisclosed	31 January 2019	
14	GK	(China) Zou Dehai	(China) Zhejiang Greentown	Undisclosed	31 January 2019	
23	MF	(England) Li Ke	(England) Brentford	Undisclosed	31 January 2019	
9	FW	(China) Zhang Yuning	(England) West Bromwich Albion	Undisclosed	24 February 2019	
27	FW	(China) Wang Gang	(China) Beijing Renhe	Undisclosed	25 February 2019	

==== Transfers out ====
#	Position	Player	Transferred to	Fee	Date	Source
9	FW	(Spain) Jonathan Soriano	(Saudi Arabia) Al-Hilal	Free transfer (Released)	15 December 2018	
7	MF	(China) Wei Shihao	(China) Guangzhou Evergrande Taobao	Undisclosed	2 February 2018	

=== Summer ===
==== Loan in ====
#	Position	Player	Transferred from	Fee	Date	Source
11	MF	(Brazil) Fernando	(Russia) Spartak Moscow	Undisclosed	31 July 2019	

== Staff ==
Position	Staff
Head coach	(France) Bruno Génésio
Assistant coach	(France) Alain Olio
Assistant coach	(China) Tao Wei
Goalkeeping coach	(France) Gilles Rousset
Fitness coach	(France) Kevin Plantet
Team physician	(China) Wang Kai
Team physician	(China) Zhang Zhiguo
Team leader	(China) Fu Bin
Analyst	(China) Cheng Jun
Analyst	(France) Alexandre Kerveillant
Press officer	(China) Jiang Xiaojun
Interpreter	(China) Fu Hao
Interpreter	(China) Ming Tian
Kit manager	(China) Kang Yuming
Kit manager	(China) Liu Peng

== Friendlies ==
=== Pre-season ===
20 January 2019 Friendly	Rijeka (Croatia)	1–0	Beijing Sinobo Guoan	Portugal
16:00 UTC+0

22 January 2019 Friendly	Slavia Prague (Czech Republic)	4–0	Beijing Sinobo Guoan	Portugal
13:00 UTC+0

30 January 2019 2019 Atlantic Cup	SV Mattersburg (Austria)	1–1 (1–3 p)	Beijing Sinobo Guoan	Albufeira, Portugal
15:00 UTC+0	Kvasiva 10'		Hou Yongyong 46' (pen.)	Stadium: Estádio Municipal de Albufeira
	Penalties
	Lercher (penalty missed); Hart (penalty scored); Kuen (penalty missed); Bürger (penalty missed) }		(penalty scored) Augusto; (penalty missed) Viera; (penalty scored) Hou Yongyong; (penalty scored) Bakambu

1 February 2019 2019 Atlantic Cup	Red Bull Salzburg (Austria)	2–0	Beijing Sinobo Guoan	Algarve, Portugal
15:00 UTC+0				Stadium: Estádio Algarve

18 February 2019 Friendly	Beijing Sinobo Guoan	3–1	(China) Sichuan Longfor	Hainan, China

== Competitions ==
=== Chinese Super League ===
==== Table ====
Pos	Team	Pld	W	D	L	GF	GA	GD	Pts	Qualification or relegation
1	Guangzhou Evergrande Taobao (C)	30	23	3	4	68	24	+44	72	Qualification for AFC Champions League group stage
2	Beijing Sinobo Guoan	30	23	1	6	60	26	+34	70	Qualification for AFC Champions League group stage
3	Shanghai SIPG	30	20	6	4	62	26	+36	66	Qualification for AFC Champions League play-off round
4	Jiangsu Suning	30	15	8	7	60	41	+19	53	
5	Shandong Luneng Taishan	30	15	6	9	55	35	+20	51	

Source: CSL
Rules for classification:
- During season: 1) Points; 2) Goal difference; 3) Goals scored.
- After season: 1) Points; 2) Head-to-head points; 3) Head-to-head goal difference; 4) Head-to-head goals scored; 5) Scores of the weight ratio of the reserve league and youth leagues.
  (C) Champions

==== Results by round ====
Round	1	2	3	4	5	6	7	8	9	10	11	12	13	14	15	16	17	18	19	20	21	22	23	24	25	26	27	28	29	30
Ground	A	A	A	H	H	A	H	A	H	H	A	A	H	H	A	H	H	H	A	A	H	H	A	A	A	H	H	A	A	H
Result	W	W	W	W	W	W	W	W	W	W	L	W	W	W	L	W	W	W	L	L	W	L	W	D	W	L	W	W	W	W
Position	5	2	2	1	1	1	1	1	1	1	1	1	1	1	1	1	1	1	2	3	2	2	2	2	2	3	3	2	2	2

Updated to match(es) played on 22 November 2019. Source: Competitive matches
A = Away; H = Home; W = Win; D = Draw; L = Loss

==== Matches ====
1 March 2019 1	Wuhan Zall	0–1	Beijing Sinobo Guoan	Wuhan
20:00 UTC+8		CSL Report	Augusto 66'	Stadium: Dongxihu Sports Center; Attendance: 24,718; Referee: Wang Jing

9 March 2019 2	Chongqing Dangdai Lifan	0–4	Beijing Sinobo Guoan	Chongqing
15:30 UTC+8		CSL Report	Viera 1'; Bakambu 35'; Zhang Yuning 41'; Wang Ziming 90+1'	Stadium: Chongqing Olympic Sports Center; Attendance: 34,865; Referee: Shen Yinhao

30 March 2019 3	Beijing Renhe	0–1	Beijing Sinobo Guoan	Beijing
15:30 UTC+8		CSL Report	Yu Dabao 60'	Stadium: Beijing Fengtai Stadium; Attendance: 22,376; Referee: Zhang Lei

5 April 2019 4	Beijing Sinobo Guoan	3–0	Jiangsu Suning	Beijing
19:35 UTC+8	Zhang Yuning 21'; Bakambu 53'; Wang Ziming 90+2'	CSL Report		Stadium: Workers' Stadium; Attendance: 46,109; Referee: Milorad Mažić (Serbia)

14 April 2019 5	Beijing Sinobo Guoan	2–1	Henan Jianye	Beijing
19:35 UTC+8	Augusto 54' (pen.); Li Ke 68'	CSL Report	Ohandza 73' (pen.)	Stadium: Workers' Stadium; Attendance: 38,583; Referee: Mark Clattenburg (England)

20 April 2019 6	Hebei China Fortune	0–1	Beijing Sinobo Guoan	Langfang
19:35 UTC+8		CSL Report	Zhang Yuning 64'	Stadium: Langfang Stadium; Attendance: 24,283; Referee: Gu Chunhan

28 April 2019 7	Beijing Sinobo Guoan	4–1	Dalian Yifang	Beijing
19:35 UTC+8	Viera 1', 42', 65'; Zhang Xizhe 19' (pen.)	CSL Report	Jiang Tao 77' (o.g.)	Stadium: Workers' Stadium; Attendance: 43,430; Referee: Milorad Mažić (Serbia)

4 May 2019 8	Guangzhou Evergrande Taobao	0–1	Beijing Sinobo Guoan	Guangzhou
19:35 UTC+8		CSL Report	Viera 64'	Stadium: Tianhe Stadium; Attendance: 45,894; Referee: Mark Clattenburg (England)

12 May 2019 9	Beijing Sinobo Guoan	3–0	Shenzhen F.C.	Beijing
19:35 UTC+8	Bakambu 11', 18'; Augusto 61'	CSL Report		Stadium: Workers' Stadium; Attendance: 36,892; Referee: Ma Ning

17 May 2019 10	Beijing Sinobo Guoan	2–1	Tianjin Tianhai	Beijing
19:35 UTC+8	Yu Dabao 37'; Li Ke 71'	CSL Report	Yang Xu 88'	Stadium: Workers' Stadium; Referee: Jonathan Barreiro (Australia)

26 May 2019 11	Shanghai SIPG	2–1	Beijing Sinobo Guoan	Shanghai
19:35 UTC+8				Stadium: Shanghai Stadium; Referee: Matthew Conger (New Zealand)

2 June 2019 12	Tianjin Teda	1–2	Beijing Sinobo Guoan	Tianjin
19:35 UTC+8				Stadium: Tianjin Olympic Center Stadium; Referee: Milorad Mažić (Serbia)

14 June 2019 13	Beijing Sinobo Guoan	2–1	Shanghai Greenland Shenhua	Beijing
18:00 UTC+8				Stadium: Workers' Stadium; Referee: Mark Clattenburg (England)

22 June 2019 14	Beijing Sinobo Guoan	3–2	Guangzhou R&F	Beijing
17:30 UTC+8				Stadium: Workers' Stadium; Referee: Ma Ning

30 June 2019 15	Shandong Luneng Taishan	2–0	Beijing Sinobo Guoan	Jinan
19:35 UTC+8				Stadium: Jinan Olympic Sports Center Stadium; Referee: Mark Clattenburg (England)

6 July 2019 16	Beijing Sinobo Guoan	3–0	Wuhan Zall	Beijing
19:35 UTC+8				Stadium: Workers' Stadium; Referee: Zhang Lei

10 July 2019 17	Beijing Sinobo Guoan	4–1	Chongqing Dangdai Lifan	Beijing
20:00 UTC+8				Stadium: Workers' Stadium; Referee: Milorad Mažić (Serbia)

17 July 2019 18	Beijing Sinobo Guoan	2–1	Beijing Renhe	Beijing
19:35 UTC+8				Stadium: Workers' Stadium; Referee: Mark Clattenburg (England)

21 July 2019 19	Jiangsu Suning	1–0	Beijing Sinobo Guoan	Nanjing
20:00 UTC+8				Stadium: Nanjing Olympic Sports Center

27 July 2019 20	Henan Jianye	1–0	Beijing Sinobo Guoan	Zhengzhou
19:35 UTC+8				Stadium: Zhengzhou Hanghai Stadium

2 August 2019 21	Beijing Sinobo Guoan	2–0	Hebei China Fortune	Beijing
20:00 UTC+8				Stadium: Workers' Stadium

15 August 2019 22	Dalian Yifang	0–2	Beijing Sinobo Guoan	Dalian
19:35 UTC+8				Stadium: Dalian Sports Center

11 August 2019 23	Beijing Sinobo Guoan	1–3	Guangzhou Evergrande Taobao	Beijing
19:35 UTC+8				Stadium: Workers' Stadium

13 September 2019 24	Shenzhen F.C.	1–1	Beijing Sinobo Guoan	Shenzhen
19:35 UTC+8	Gan 15'		Bakambu 74'	Stadium: Shenzhen Universiade Sports Centre

22 September 2019 25	Tianjin Quanjian	0–3	Beijing Sinobo Guoan	Tianjin
17:30 UTC+8			Hou 4'; Zhang 28'; Augusto 90+1'	Stadium: Tianjin Olympic Center Stadium

19 October 2019 26	Beijing Sinobo Guoan	0–2	Shanghai SIPG	Beijing
19:35 UTC+8			Li 49'; Ahmedow 66'	Stadium: Workers' Stadium

26 October 2019 27	Beijing Sinobo Guoan	3–1	Tianjin Teda	Beijing
19:35 UTC+8	Bakambu 25'; Lü Peng (yellow card) 67'; Augusto 80'; Wang 88'; Jin Taiyan (yellow card) 90'		Yang Fan (yellow card) 55'; Wagner 64'	Stadium: Workers' Stadium; Referee: Mark Clattenburg (England)

22 November 2019 28	Shanghai Greenland Shenhua	1–2	Beijing Sinobo Guoan	Shanghai
19:35 UTC+8	Sun Shilin (yellow card) 9'; Ighalo (yellow card) 32'; Ighalo 58' (pen.); Qian Jiegei (yellow card) 78'		Bakambu 6'; Yu Yang (yellow card) 32'; Augusto 62'; Zhang Yuning (yellow card) 72'	Stadium: Hongkou Football Stadium; Attendance: 21,175; Referee: Matthew Conger (New Zealand)

27 November 2019 29	Guangzhou R&F	1–4	Beijing Sinobo Guoan	Guangzhou
19:35 UTC+8	Saba 42'; Chen Zhizhao (yellow card) 46'; Chun-Lok Tan (yellow card) 63'; Zou Zheng (yellow card) 69'		Augusto 28'; Bakambu 31', 33'; Zhang Yuning 48'; Fernando (yellow card) 88'	Stadium: Yuexiushan Stadium; Attendance: 12,356; Referee: Mark Clattenburg (England)

1 December 2019 30	Beijing Sinobo Guoan	3–2	Shandong Luneng Taishan	Beijing
15:00 UTC+8	Zhang Yuning 43'; Augusto 45+2' (pen.); Wang Ziming 91'	Report	Guedes 15' (pen.); Fellaini 34'; Wang Dalei (yellow card) 45+2'; Zhou Haibin (yellow card) 62'; Guedes (yellow card) 90'	Stadium: Workers' Stadium; Attendance: 51,708; Referee: Viktor Kassai (Hungary)

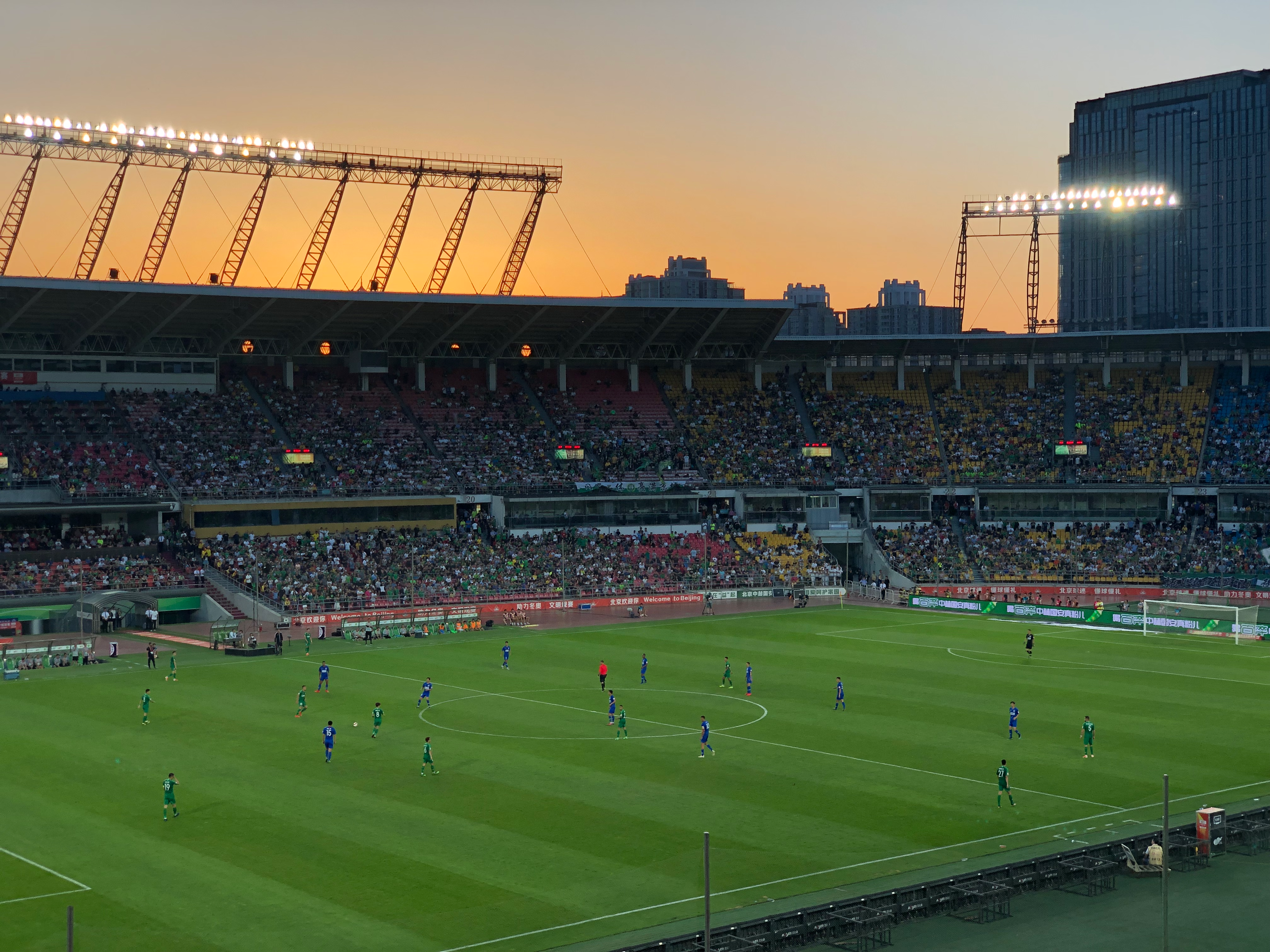
Workers' Stadium during the 2019 match against Shanghai Greenland Shenhua

=== Chinese FA Cup ===
1 May 2019 Fourth Round	Heilongjiang Lava Spring	0–1	Beijing Sinobo Guoan	Harbin
15:30 UTC+8				Stadium: Harbin ICE Center Stadium; Referee: Kou Jianxun

29 May 2019 Fifth Round	Beijing Sinobo Guoan	3–1	Changchun Yatai	Beijing
19:35 UTC+8				Stadium: Workers' Stadium; Referee: Zhang Lei

July 2019 Quarter-Finals	Shandong Luneng Taishan	2–1 (a.e.t.)	Beijing Sinobo Guoan
18:00 UTC+8

=== Chinese FA Super Cup ===
23 February 2019	Shanghai SIPG	2–0	Beijing Sinobo Guoan	Suzhou
19:35	Wang Shenchao 61'; Lü Wenjun 65'			Stadium: Suzhou Olympic Sports Centre; Attendance: 25,132; Referee: Zhang Lei

=== AFC Champions League ===
==== Group stage ====
Pos	Team	Pld	W	D	L	GF	GA	GD	Pts	Qualification	JEO	URA	BJG	BUR
1	(South Korea) Jeonbuk Hyundai Motors	6	4	1	1	7	3	+4	13	Advance to knockout stage	—	2–1	3–1	0–0
2	(Japan) Urawa Red Diamonds	6	3	1	2	9	4	+5	10	Advance to knockout stage	0–1	—	3–0	3–0
3	(China) Beijing FC	6	2	1	3	6	8	−2	7		0–1	0–0	—	2–0
4	(Thailand) Buriram United	6	1	1	4	3	10	−7	4		1–0	1–2	1–3	—

Source: AFC
Rules for classification: Group stage tiebreakers

6 March 2019 1	Jeonbuk Hyundai Motors (South Korea)	3–1	(China) Beijing Sinobo Guoan	Jeonju, South Korea
19:00 UTC+9	Han Kyo-won 14'; Lee Dong-gook 48'; Kim Shin-wook 71'	Live Report	Zhang Xizhe 41'	Stadium: Jeonju World Cup Stadium; Attendance: 8,566; Referee: Aziz Asimov (Uzbekistan)

13 March 2019 2	Beijing Sinobo Guoan (China)	0–0	(Japan) Urawa Red Diamonds	Beijing, China
20:00 UTC+8		Live Report		Stadium: Workers' Stadium; Attendance: 43,112; Referee: Masoud Tufayelieh (Syria)

9 April 2019 3	Buriram United (Thailand)	1–3	(China) Beijing Sinobo Guoan	Buriram, Thailand
18:00 UTC+7	Suphanat 80'	Live Report	Bakambu 2', 29', 54'	Stadium: Chang Arena; Attendance: 9,345; Referee: Hettikamkanamge Perera (Sri Lanka)

24 April 2019 4	Beijing Sinobo Guoan (China)	2–0	(Thailand) Buriram United	Beijing, China
20:00 UTC+8	Augusto 55' (pen.); Ba Dun 76'	Live Report		Stadium: Workers' Stadium; Attendance: 25,720; Referee: Khamis Al-Kuwari (Qatar)

7 May 2019 5	Beijing Sinobo Guoan (China)	0–1	(South Korea) Jeonbuk Hyundai Motors	Beijing, China
20:00 UTC+8		Live Report		Stadium: Workers' Stadium; Referee: Ammar Al-Jeneibi (United Arab Emirates)

21 May 2019 6	Urawa Red Diamonds (Japan)	3–0	(China) Beijing Sinobo Guoan	Saitama, Japan
19:00 UTC+9		Live Report		Stadium: Saitama Stadium 2002

== Statistics ==
=== Appearances and goals ===
As of 31 December 2019

No.	Pos.	Nat.	Name	Chinese Super League		Chinese FA Cup		Chinese FA Super Cup		AFC Champions League		Total	
No.	Pos.	Nat.	Name	Apps	Goals	Apps	Goals	Apps	Goals	Apps	Goals	Apps	Goals
1	GK	CHN	Hou Sen	1	0	0	0	0	0	0	0	1	0
2	DF	KOR	Kim Min-jae	25(1)	0	1(1)	0	0	0	6	0	32(2)	0
3	DF	CHN	Yu Yang	6(6)	0	3	1	0	0	0(2)	0	9(8)	1
4	DF	CHN	Li Lei	18	0	1	0	1	0	5	0	25	0
5	MF	BRA	Renato Augusto	30	15	0(1)	0	1	0	6	1	37(1)	16
6	MF	CHN	Chi Zhongguo	21(5)	0	0(1)	0	1	0	5	0	27(6)	0
7	MF	CHN	Hou Yongyong	2(14)	1	2	1	0(1)	0	0	0	4(15)	2
8	MF	CHN	Piao Cheng	14(4)	2	1	0	1	0	2	0	18(4)	2
9	FW	CHN	Zhang Yuning	19(6)	8	1	0	0	0	3(3)	0	23(9)	8
10	MF	CHN	Zhang Xizhe	23(1)	2	0	0	1	0	5	1	29(1)	3
11	MF	BRA	Fernando	4(3)	0	0	0	0	0	0	0	4(3)	0
14	GK	CHN	Zou Dehai	28	0	2	0	0	0	6	0	35	0
15	DF	CHN	Liu Huan	2(1)	0	2	0	0	0	1(1)	0	5(2)	0
16	DF	CHN	Zheng Yiming	0	0	0(1)	0	0	0	0	0	0(1)	0
17	FW	COD	Cédric Bakambu	14(2)	10	3	3	1	0	6	3	25(2)	16
18	MF	CHN	Jin Taiyan	10(3)	0	1(2)	0	0	0	0(1)	0	11(6)	0
19	FW	CHN	Yu Dabao	25	4	1	0	1	0	6	0	33	4
20	FW	CHN	Wang Ziming	10(16)	7	1(1)	0	0(1)	0	1(2)	0	12(20)	7
21	MF	ESP	Jonathan Viera	17	8	1	0	1	0	5	0	24	8
22	GK	CHN	Yang Zhi	0	0	0	0	0	0	0	0	0	0
23	MF	CHN	Li Ke	21(4)	2	1(1)	0	0	0	0	0	22(5)	2
24	DF	CHN	Zhang Yu	1(1)	0	1	0	0	0	0(1)	0	2(2)	0
25	GK	CHN	Guo Quanbo	1(1)	0	1	0	1	0	0	0	3(1)	0
26	MF	CHN	Lü Peng	4(7)	0	3	0	1	0	2(1)	0	10(8)	0
27	FW	CHN	Wang Gang	25	0	2	0	0	0	4(1)	0	31(1)	0
28	DF	CHN	Jiang Tao	3(1)	0	0	0	1	0	2	0	6(1)	0
29	MF	CHN	Ba Dun	2(7)	1	2	0	0	0	1(3)	1	5(10)	2
30	DF	CHN	Lei Tenglong	4(2)	0	3	0	0	0	0	0	7(2)	0
32	MF	CHN	Liu Guobo	0(4)	0	0(1)	0	0	0	0	0	0(5)	0
33	GK	CHN	Ma Kunyue	0	0	0	0	0	0	0	0	0	0
39	FW	CHN	Wen Da	0	0	0	0	0	0	0	0	0	0
40	DF	CHN	Wang Congming	0	0	0	0	0	0	0	0	0	0

=== Top scorers ===
As of 31 December 2019

Rank	Position	Name	Chinese Super League	Chinese FA Cup	Chinese FA Super Cup	AFC Champions League	Total
1	FW	(Democratic Republic of the Congo) Cédric Bakambu	10	3	0	3	16
1	MF	(Brazil) Renato Augusto	15	0	0	1	16
3	MF	(Spain) Jonathan Viera	8	0	0	0	8
3	FW	(China) Zhang Yuning	8	0	0	0	8
5	FW	(China) Wang Ziming	7	0	0	0	7
6	FW	(China) Yu Dabao	4	0	0	0	4
7	MF	(China) Zhang Xizhe	2	0	0	1	3
8	MF	(China) Li Ke	2	0	0	0	2
8	MF	(China) Piao Cheng	2	0	0	0	2
8	MF	(China) Hou Yong Yong	1	1	0	0	2
8	FW	(China) Ba Dun	1	0	0	1	2
12	MF	(China) Yu Yang	1	0	0	0	1
Total			62	4	0	6	72

=== Top assists ===
As of 31 December 2019

Rank	Position	Name	Chinese Super League	Chinese FA Cup	Chinese FA Super Cup	AFC Champions League	Total
1	MF	(Brazil) Renato Augusto	11	0	0	2	13
2	MF	(Spain) Jonathan Viera	6	1	0	0	7
3	FW	(China) Zhang Yuning	5	0	0	0	5
3	FW	(Democratic Republic of the Congo) Cédric Bakambu	5	0	0	0	5
5	MF	(China) Piao Cheng	2	1	0	0	3
5	MF	(China) Zhang Xizhe	3	0	0	0	3
7	MF	(China) Chi Zhongguo	2	0	0	0	2
7	DF	(China) Jin Taiyan	2	0	0	0	2
7	DF	(China) Li Lei	1	0	0	1	2
7	DF	(China) Li Lei	1	1	0	0	2
11	DF	(China) Jiang Tao	0	0	0	1	1
11	MF	(China) Li Ke	0	1	0	0	1
11	FW	(China) Wang Ziming	1	0	0	0	1
11	DF	(China) Yu Dabao	1	0	0	0	1
11	DF	(China) Yu Yang	1	0	0	0	1
Total			41	4	0	4	49

=== Clean sheets ===
As of 31 December 2019

Rank	Name	Chinese Super League	Chinese FA Cup	Chinese FA Super Cup	AFC Champions League	Total
1	(China) Zou Dehai	11	0	0	2	13
2	(China) Guo Quanbo	1	1	0	0	2
Total		12	1	0	2	15

=== Discipline ===
N	P	Nat.	Name	Chinese Super League			Chinese FA Cup			Chinese FA Super Cup			AFC Champions League			Total			Notes
N	P	Nat.	Name	Yellow card	Second yellow card	Red card	Yellow card	Second yellow card	Red card	Yellow card	Second yellow card	Red card	Yellow card	Second yellow card	Red card	Yellow card	Second yellow card	Red card	Notes
19	DF	(China)	Yu Dabao	7									1			8			
14	GK	(China)	Zou Dehai	3												3			
6	MF	(China)	Chi Zhongguo	3												3			
27	DF	(China)	Wang Gang	2									1			3			
23	MF	(China)	Li Ke	2												2			
5	MF	(Brazil)	Renato Augusto	2												2			
18	DF	(China)	Jin Taiyan	2												2			
9	FW	(China)	Zhang Yuning	3												3			
8	MF	(China)	Piao Cheng	1												1			
15	DF	(China)	Liu Huan	1									1			2			
11	MF	(Brazil)	Fernando	1												1			
29	ST	(China)	Ba Dun	1												1			
26	MF	(China)	Lü Peng	1			1									2			
28	DF	(China)	Jiang Tao	1												1			
30	DF	(China)	Lei Tenglong	1												1			
10	MF	(China)	Zhang Xizhe	1									1			2			
3	DF	(China)	Yu Yang	2	1											2	1		
24	DF	(China)	Zhang Yu	1	1											1	1		
20	ST	(China)	Wang Ziming	1												1			
4	DF	(China)	Li Lei	1									2			3			
2	DF	(South Korea)	Kim Min-jae										1			1			

Last updated: 31 December 2019
Ordered by (red card) , (second yellow card) and (yellow card)
(yellow card) = Number of bookings; (second yellow card) = Number of sending offs after a second yellow card; (red card) = Number of sending offs by a direct red card.
