= Guo Quanbo =

Chinese footballer

Guo Quanbo 郭全博
Personal information
- Date of birth: 31 August 1997 (age 29)
- Place of birth: Tianmen, Hubei, China
- Height: 1.85 m (6 ft 1 in)
- Position: Goalkeeper

Youth career
- 2005–2016: Beijing Guoan

Senior career*
Years	Team	Apps	(Gls)
2017–2023	Beijing Guoan	33	(0)
2023	→ Meizhou Hakka (loan)	2	(0)
2024–2025	Meizhou Hakka	31	(0)
Total		66	(0)

International career
2018–2020	China U23	2	(0)
- * Club domestic league appearances and goals

Guo Quanbo (Chinese: 郭全博; born 31 August 1997) is a Chinese former professional footballer who played as a goalkeeper.

== Club career ==
Guo Quanbo was born in Tianmen, Hubei. He joined Chinese Super League side Beijing Guoan's youth academy at the age of 8 in 2005 when traveling to Beijing with his family. He was promoted to Beijing Sinobo Guoan's first team squad by manager José González in 2017. On 19 May 2018, he made his senior debut in a 2–0 away win over Changchun Yatai. Beijing Guoan manager Roger Schmidt named Guo as number one in the rest of the season. He played 22 matches in his debut season and won 2018 Chinese FA Cup title with Guoan. On 3 December 2018, Guo extended his contract with the club until the end of 2023. On 4 February 2026 Guo Quanbo announced his retirement from professional football via his social media.

== International career ==
Guo received his first call up for the China national football team by manager Marcello Lippi for the training camp of 2019 AFC Asian Cup. On 27 December 2018, he was named in the final 23-man squad. However, he was replaced by Zhang Lu on 5 January 2019.

== Career statistics ==
Appearances and goals by club, season and competition
Club	Season	League			National Cup		Continental		Other		Total	
Club	Season	Division	Apps	Goals	Apps	Goals	Apps	Goals	Apps	Goals	Apps	Goals
Beijing Guoan	2018	Chinese Super League	18	0	4	0	–		–		22	0
Beijing Guoan	2019	Chinese Super League	2	0	1	0	0	0	1 (Note: Appearances in Chinese FA Super Cup)	0	4	0
Beijing Guoan	2020	Chinese Super League	12	0	0	0	1	0	–		13	0
Beijing Guoan	2021	Chinese Super League	0	0	0	0	6	0	–		6	0
Beijing Guoan	2022	Chinese Super League	1	0	1	0	–		–		2	0
Beijing Guoan	Total		33	0	6	0	7	0	1	0	47	0
Meizhou Hakka (loan)	2023	Chinese Super League	2	0	1	0	–		–		3	0
Meizhou Hakka	2024	Chinese Super League	2	0	1	0	–		–		3	0
Meizhou Hakka	2025	Chinese Super League	29	0	0	0	–		–		29	0
Meizhou Hakka	Total		31	0	1	0	0	0	0	0	32	0
Career total			66	0	8	0	7	0	1	0	82	0

== Honours ==
=== Club ===
Beijing Guoan

- Chinese FA Cup: 2018
