= Zhang Yuning (footballer, born 1997) =

Chinese footballer (born 1997)

Zhang Yuning 张玉宁
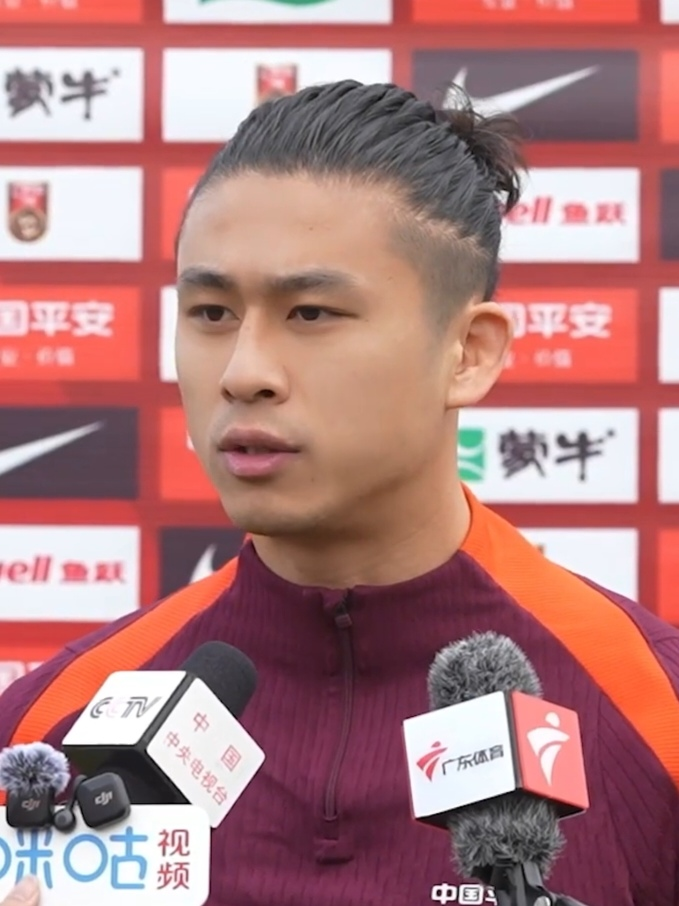
- Zhang in 2026

Personal information
- Full name: Zhang Yuning
- Date of birth: 5 January 1997 (age 29)
- Place of birth: Cangnan, Zhejiang, China
- Height: 1.86 m (6 ft 1 in)
- Position: Forward

Team information
- Current team: Beijing Guoan
- Number: 9

Youth career
- 2008–2014: Hangzhou Greentown

Senior career*
Years	Team	Apps	(Gls)
2015	Hangzhou Greentown	0	(0)
2015–2017	Vitesse	24	(3)
2016–2017	→ Jong Vitesse (loan)	9	(1)
2017–2019	West Bromwich Albion	0	(0)
2017–2018	→ Werder Bremen (loan)	0	(0)
2018–2019	→ ADO Den Haag (loan)	6	(0)
2019–	Beijing Guoan	172	(68)

International career^{‡}
2011–2012	China U16	9	(6)
2015–2016	China U19	9	(6)
2015–2020	China U23	32	(15)
2016–	China	51	(12 (Note: Most football databases list the goal scored by China in the match played against Thailand on 6 June 2024 as being scored by Zhang. A close-range volley from Behram Abduweli scraped Zhang in the back, and as a result, the goal was given to Zhang according to most sources. In the follow-up, Behram scored a goal for China against Indonesia, for which the Asian Football Confederation described as Behram's "first international goal." However, some sources do list this goal as being scored by Behram. This article recognises the goal scored against Thailand as being scored by Zhang.))
2026	China U23 (wildcard)	6	(2)
Medal record
Men's football
Representing China
EAFF Championship
Bronze medal – third place	2025 South Korea	Team
Asian Games
Bronze medal – third place	2026 Aichi–Nagoya	Team
- * Club domestic league appearances and goals as of 8 November 2026 ‡ National team caps and goals as of 17 November 2026

Zhang Yuning
- Simplified Chinese: 张玉宁
- Traditional Chinese: 張玉寧
Transcriptions
Standard Mandarin
- Hanyu Pinyin: Zhāng Yùníng
- IPA: [ʈʂáŋ ŷ nǐŋ]

Zhang Yuning (Chinese: 张玉宁; pinyin: Zhāng Yùníng; born 5 January 1997) is a Chinese professional footballer who plays as a forward for Chinese Super League club Beijing Guoan and captains the China national team.

== Club career ==
=== Hangzhou Greentown ===
Zhang started his football career when he joined Hangzhou Greentown's youth academy in 2008. Due to several good performances for the academy, he was called up to the Chinese national under-17 team for the 2012 AFC U-16 Championship and scored two goals in three matches during the tournament. During the 2015 season, he was promoted to the club's first team, making his debut and scoring his first goal for the club on 13 May 2015 in a 1–1 draw against Wuhan Hongxing in the 2015 Chinese FA Cup.

=== Vitesse ===
In July 2015, Zhang transferred to Eredivisie side Vitesse, signing a two-year contract. He made his debut for the club on 13 February 2016 in a 3–0 win against SC Heerenveen, coming on as a substitute for Valeri Qazaishvili in the 86th minute. On 6 March 2016, he scored his first goal for the club in a 2–1 win against Roda JC. He scored his second goal of the season on 8 May 2016 in a 2–2 draw against Twente. Zhang was given the number 9 shirt for the 2016-17 season; however, he mainly played as a back-up to Ricky van Wolfswinkel throughout the season. On 26 October 2016, he scored the opening goal in a 4-1 win against RKC Waalwijkin the second round of the 2016-17 KNVB Cup. He scored his only league goal of the season on 3 December 2016 in a 3–1 home win against PEC Zwolle. On 31 March 2017, Zhang extended his contract with the club until 30 June 2018. He was an unused substitute as Vitesse won 2–0 against AZ Alkmaar in the 2017 KNVB Cup Final on 30 April 2017.

=== West Bromwich Albion ===
In July 2017, Zhang transferred to Premier League side West Bromwich Albion on a three-year contract for an undisclosed fee and was immediately loaned to Bundesliga side Werder Bremen for two years.

==== Werder Bremen (loan) ====
Zhang failed to establish himself with the first team and appeared on the bench just twice during the 2017-18 season. He was an unused substitute in a home match against Borussia Dortmund on 29 April 2018 and an away match against Mainz 05 on 12 May 2018. His loan spell was subsequently cut short in June 2018.

==== ADO Den Haag (loan) ====
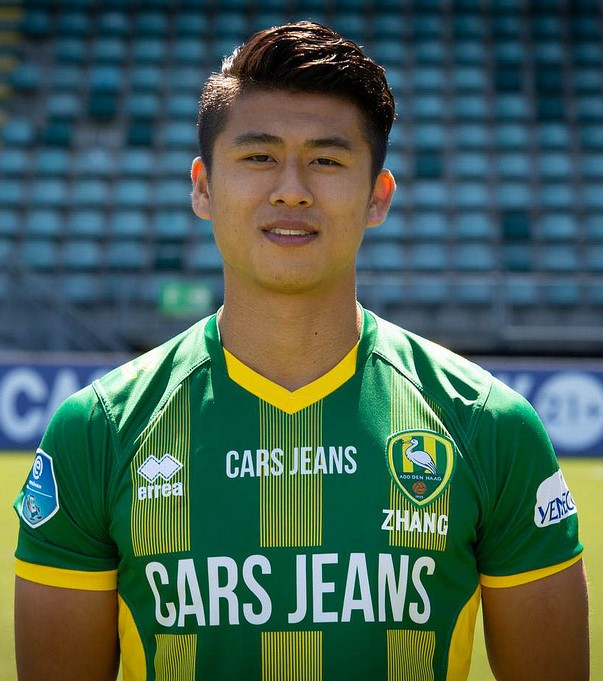
Zhang with ADO Den Haag in 2018

On 22 June 2018, Zhang was loaned out to Eredivisie side ADO Den Haag for the 2018-19 season. He suffered a ligament tear on his right ankle on 24 August 2018 when he represented the Chinese under-23 national team during the 2018 Asian Games, ruling him out for three months. He made his debut for the club on 24 November 2018 in a 3–2 away win against PEC Zwolle. After playing six league matches for the club without scoring, his loan spell was cut short for the second time on 22 February 2019.

=== Beijing Guoan ===
On 24 February 2019, Zhang transferred to Chinese Super League side Beijing Guoan. On 1 March 2019, he made his debut for the club in a 1–0 away win against Wuhan Zall. He scored his first goal for the club on 9 March 2019 in a 4–0 away win against Chongqing Lifan.

== International career ==
Zhang made his debut for the Chinese national team on 3 June 2016 in a 4–2 win against Trinidad and Tobago, scoring twice and assisting a goal on his debut.

Zhang was named in China's squad for the 2023 AFC Asian Cup in Qatar and came on as a substitute in their opening match against Tajikistan on 13 January 2024.

During the 2026 FIFA World Cup qualification match against Thailand on 6 June 2024, he was involved in a rather controversial goal. China were trailing behind by one goal when Behram Abduweli, the substitute, took a shot from a deflected header by his teammate and hit the net at the 79th minute; most sources attributed the goal to Behram but FIFA and AFC considered Zhang to be the scorer when the ball was believed to have deflected off his back, albeit unintentionally and Zhang being in a completely passive position.

On 14 November 2024, Zhang scored a crucial 91st minute late winner in a 1–0 away win against Bahrain in the third round of 2026 FIFA World Cup qualification, only three minutes after a potential match winning goal by Ali Haram was ruled out for offside.

== Personal life ==
Zhang comes from a devout Christian family and has stated that Kaká is his footballing role model.

His younger brother Zhang Yuquan is also a professional footballer currently playing as a goalkeeper at Shenzhen Peng City.

== Career statistics ==
=== Club ===
As of 20 November 2026

Appearances and goals by club, season and competition
Club	Season	League			National cup		Continental		Other		Total	
Club	Season	Division	Apps	Goals	Apps	Goals	Apps	Goals	Apps	Goals	Apps	Goals
Hangzhou Greentown	2015	Chinese Super League	0	0	1	1	–		–		1	1
Vitesse	2015–16	Eredivisie	8	2	0	0	0	0	–		8	2
Vitesse	2016–17	Eredivisie	16	1	3	1	–		–		19	2
Vitesse	Total		24	3	3	1	0	0	0	0	27	4
Jong Vitesse (loan)	2016–17	Tweede Divisie	9	1	–		–		–		9	1
Werder Bremen (loan)	2017–18	Bundesliga	0	0	0	0	–		–		0	0
ADO Den Haag (loan)	2018–19	Eredivisie	6	0	0	0	–		–		6	0
Beijing Guoan	2019	Chinese Super League	25	8	1	0	6	0	0 (Note: Appearances in Chinese FA Super Cup)	0	32	8
Beijing Guoan	2020	Chinese Super League	18	6	1	0	6	2	–		25	8
Beijing Guoan	2021	Chinese Super League	20	10	0	0	0	0	–		20	10
Beijing Guoan	2022	Chinese Super League	30	19	0	0	–		–		30	19
Beijing Guoan	2023	Chinese Super League	6	0	0	0	–		–		6	0
Beijing Guoan	2024	Chinese Super League	17	4	2	2	–		–		19	6
Beijing Guoan	2025	Chinese Super League	27	6	4	2	4	1	–		35	9
Beijing Guoan	2026	Chinese Super League	29	15	4	2	2	0	1	0	36	17
Beijing Guoan	Total		172	68	12	6	18	3	1	0	203	78
Career total			211	72	16	8	18	3	1	0	245	83

=== International ===
As of 17 November 2026

Appearances and goals by national team and year
National team	Year	Apps	Goals
China	2016	6	2
China	2017	3	0
China	2018	0	0
China	2019	1	0
China	2020	0	0
China	2021	8	3
China	2022	4	0
China	2023	2	0
China	2024	14	3
China	2025	7	0
China	2026	6	4
Total		51	12

Scores and results list China's goal tally first, score column indicates score after each Zhang goal.

List of international goals scored by Zhang Yuning
No.	Date	Venue	Opponent	Score	Result	Competition
1	3 June 2016	Olympic Sports Center Stadium, Qinhuangdao, China	Trinidad and Tobago	2–0	4–2	Friendly
2	3 June 2016	Olympic Sports Center Stadium, Qinhuangdao, China	Trinidad and Tobago	3–0	4–2	Friendly
3	11 June 2021	Sharjah Stadium, Sharjah, United Arab Emirates	Maldives	4–0	5–0	2022 FIFA World Cup qualification
4	15 June 2021	Sharjah Stadium, Sharjah, United Arab Emirates	Syria	3–1	3–1	2022 FIFA World Cup qualification
5	7 October 2021	Sharjah Stadium, Sharjah, United Arab Emirates	Vietnam	1–0	3–2	2022 FIFA World Cup qualification
6	6 June 2024	Shenyang Olympic Sports Centre Stadium, Shenyang, China	Thailand	1–1	1–1	2026 FIFA World Cup qualification
7	15 October 2024	Qingdao Youth Football Stadium, Qingdao, China	Indonesia	2–0	2–1	2026 FIFA World Cup qualification
8	14 November 2024	Bahrain National Stadium, Riffa, Bahrain	Bahrain	1–0	1–0	2026 FIFA World Cup qualification
9	27 March 2026	Accor Stadium, Sydney, Australia	Curaçao	2–0	2–0	2026 FIFA Series
10	5 June 2026	Jalan Besar Stadium, Jalan Besar, Singapore	Singapore	2–0	2–1	Friendly
11	14 November 2026	Zhaoqing New District Sports Center Stadium, Zhaoqing, China	Malaysia	2–0	2–0	Friendly
12	17 November 2026	Zhaoqing New District Sports Center Stadium, Zhaoqing, China	Bahrain	2–2	2–2	Friendly

== Honours ==
Vitesse

- KNVB Cup: 2016–17

Beijing Guoan

- Chinese FA Cup: 2025
- Chinese FA Super Cup: 2026

Individual

- Chinese Super League Domestic Golden Boot winner: 2022
- Chinese Footballer of the Year: 2022
