= Ling Zhongyang =

Chinese association football player

Personal information
- Date of birth: 2 January 2001 (age 25)
- Place of birth: China
- Position: Defender

Team information
- Current team: Beijing Guoan
- Number: 62

Youth career
- –2020: Beijing Guoan

Senior career*
Years	Team	Apps	(Gls)
2020–	Beijing Guoan	1	(0)
- * Club domestic league appearances and goals as of 14:01, 31 January 2023 (UTC)

Ling Zhongyang (Chinese: 凌中阳; born 2 January 2001) is a Chinese footballer currently playing as a defender for Beijing Guoan.

== Club career ==
Ling Zhongyang was promoted to the senior team of Beijing Guoan within the 2020 Chinese Super League season. He would make his debut in a Chinese FA Cup game on 28 November 2020 against Chengdu Better City in a 1–0 victory. He would be given an opportunity to participate within senior games when he was part of the AFC Champions League squad, which was a mix of reserves and youth players to participate within centralized venues while the clubs senior players were still dealing with self-isolating measures due to COVID-19. He would make his continental debut in an AFC Champions League game on 29 June 2021 against Kawasaki Frontale in a 7–0 defeat. He would go on to make his debut in a league game on 23 December 2022 against Guangzhou F.C. in a 3–1 victory.

== Career statistics ==
As of 31 January 2023.

Club	Season	League			Cup		Continental		Other		Total	
Club	Season	Division	Apps	Goals	Apps	Goals	Apps	Goals	Apps	Goals	Apps	Goals
Beijing Guoan	2020	Chinese Super League	0	0	2	0	0	0	-		2	0
Beijing Guoan	2021	Chinese Super League	0	0	0	0	4 (Note: Appearances in the AFC Champions League)	0	-		4	0
Beijing Guoan	2022	Chinese Super League	1	0	0	0	-		-		1	0
Beijing Guoan	Total		1	0	2	0	4	0	0	0	7	0
Career total			1	0	2	0	4	0	0	0	7	0
