= Chi Wenyi =

Chinese footballer (born 1988)

Personal information
- Date of birth: 18 February 1988 (age 38)
- Place of birth: Yanji, Jilin, China
- Height: 1.83 m (6 ft 0 in)
- Position: Goalkeeper

Senior career*
Years	Team	Apps	(Gls)
2004–2017	Yanbian Funde	207	(0)
2018–2020	Beijing Guoan	0	(0)
2019	→ Hebei China Fortune (loan)	12	(0)
2020–2021	Hebei China Fortune	12	(0)
2023	Nantong Haimen Codion	0	(0)

International career^{‡}
2004–2005	China U17		
2017	China	1	(0)
- * Club domestic league appearances and goals as of 1 December 2023 ‡ National team caps and goals as of 1 December 2023

Chi Wenyi
- Chinese: 池文一
Transcriptions
Standard Mandarin
- Hanyu Pinyin: Chí Wényī
- IPA: [ʈʂʰɻ̩̌ wə̌n í]

Chinese Korean name
- Chosŏn'gŭl: 지문일
Transcriptions
- Revised Romanization: Ji Munil
- McCune–Reischauer: Chi Munil

Chi Wenyi (Chinese: 池文一; Korean: 지문일; born 18 February 1988) is a Chinese former footballer.

== Club career ==
Chi Wenyi started his professional football career in 2004 when he was promoted to Yanbian FC's first squad. On 5 March 2016, Chi made his Super League debut in the first match of 2016 season against Shanghai Shenhua.

On 11 February 2018, Chi transferred to Super League side Beijing Sinobo Guoan. Failed to establish himself within the first team, he was loaned to Hebei China Fortune for the 2019 season on 28 February 2019.

== International career ==
Chi Wenyi played as a back-up for Wang Dalei in the 2005 FIFA U-17 World Championship. He appeared in the tournament for China U17 once on 22 September 2005 in the last match of group stage against Ghana. On 10 January 2017, Chi made his debut for Chinese national team in the 2017 China Cup against Iceland.

== Career statistics ==
Statistics accurate as of match played 31 December 2020.

Appearances and goals by club, season and competition
Club	Season	League			National Cup		Continental		Other		Total	
Club	Season	Division	Apps	Goals	Apps	Goals	Apps	Goals	Apps	Goals	Apps	Goals
Yanbian FC	2004	China League One	2	0	0	0	-		-		2	0
Yanbian FC	2005	China League One	1	0	0	0	-		-		1	0
Yanbian FC	2006	China League One	5	0	0	0	-		-		5	0
Yanbian FC	2007	China League One	16	0	-		-		-		16	0
Yanbian FC	2008	China League One	9	0	-		-		-		9	0
Yanbian FC	2009	China League One	11	0	-		-		-		11	0
Yanbian FC	2010	China League One	21	0	-		-		-		21	0
Yanbian FC	2011	China League One	25	0	4	0	-		-		29	0
Yanbian FC	2012	China League One	14	0	1	0	-		-		15	0
Yanbian FC	2013	China League One	9	0	0	0	-		-		9	0
Yanbian FC	2014	China League One	11	0	1	0	-		-		12	0
Yanbian FC	2015	China League One	25	0	2	0	-		-		27	0
Yanbian FC	2016	Chinese Super League	30	0	0	0	-		-		30	0
Yanbian FC	2017	Chinese Super League	28	0	0	0	-		-		28	0
Yanbian FC	Total		207	0	8	0	0	0	0	0	215	0
Beijing Guoan	2018	Chinese Super League	0	0	0	0	-		-		0	0
Hebei China Fortune (loan)	2019	Chinese Super League	12	0	0	0	-		-		12	0
Hebei China Fortune	2020	Chinese Super League	5	0	1	0	-		-		6	0
Career total			224	0	9	0	0	0	0	0	233	0

== Honours ==
=== Club ===
Yanbian Funde

- China League One: 2015

Beijing Guoan

- Chinese FA Cup: 2018
