= Shao Tianfa =

Chinese association football player

Personal information
- Date of birth: 4 May 2001 (age 25)
- Position: Midfielder

Team information
- Current team: Beijing Guoan

Youth career
- –2020: Beijing Guoan

Senior career*
| Years | Team | Apps | (Gls) |
| 2020– | Beijing Guoan | 0 | (0) |
- * Club domestic league appearances and goals as of 14:01, 29 June 2021 (UTC)

Shao Tianfa (Chinese: 邵天发; born 4 May 2001) is a Chinese footballer currently playing as a midfielder for Beijing Guoan.

== Career statistics ==
=== Club ===
As of 26 June 2021.

| Club | Season | League | | | Cup | | Continental | | Other | | Total | |
| Club | Season | Division | Apps | Goals | Apps | Goals | Apps | Goals | Apps | Goals | Apps | Goals |
|---|---|---|---|---|---|---|---|---|---|---|---|---|
| Beijing Guoan | 2020 | Chinese Super League | 0 | 0 | 1 (Note: Appearances in the Chinese FA Cup) | 0 | 0 | 0 | 0 | 0 | 1 | 0 |
| Beijing Guoan | 2021 | Chinese Super League | 0 | 0 | 0 | 0 | 0 | 0 | 0 | 0 | 0 | 0 |
| Career total | | | 0 | 0 | 1 | 0 | 0 | 0 | 0 | 0 | 1 | 0 |
