= John Hou Sæter =

Norwegian footballer (born 1998)

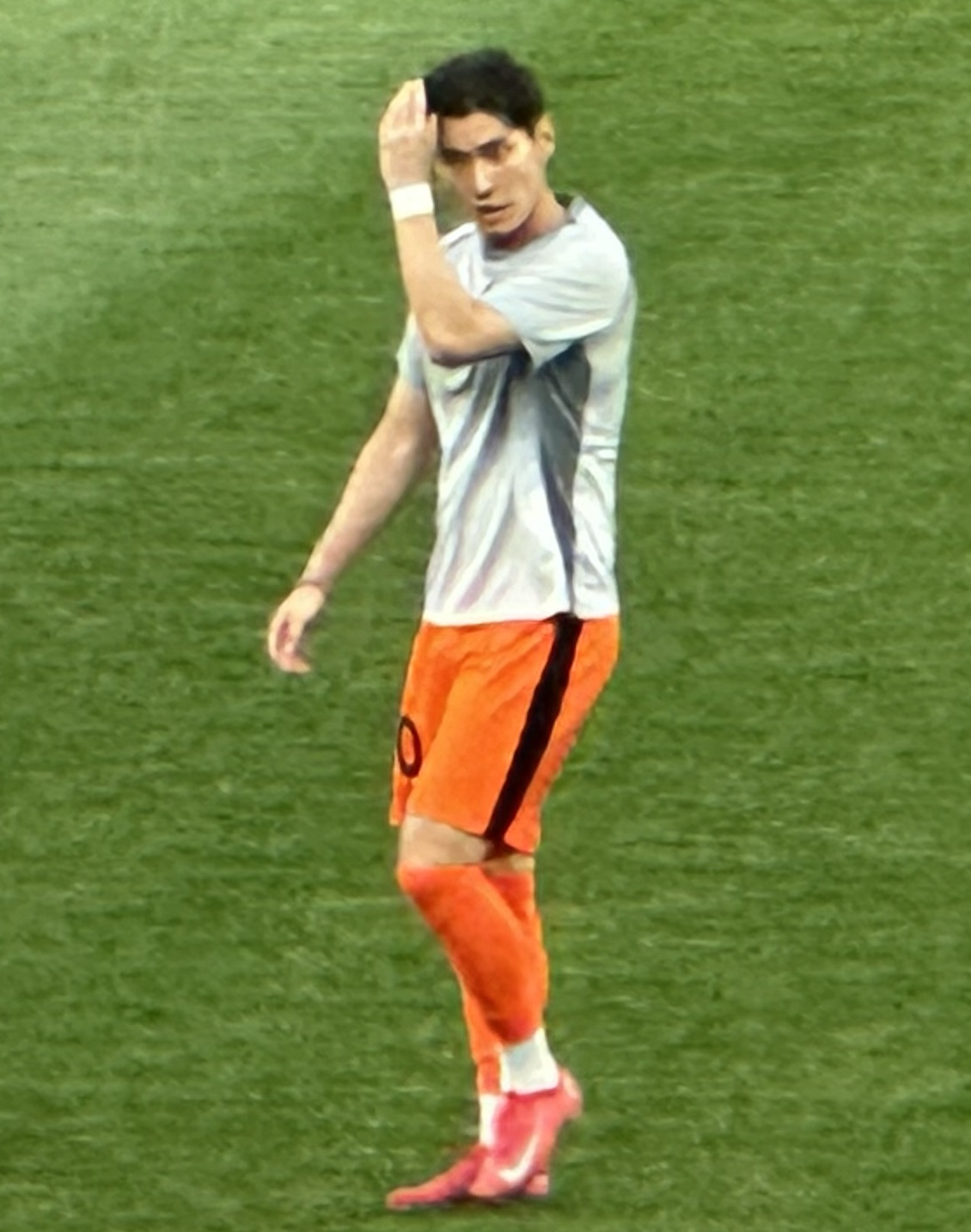
- Hou Sæter in May 2025

Personal information
- Full name: Hou Yongyong
- Birth name: John Hou Sæter
- Date of birth: 13 January 1998 (age 28)
- Place of birth: Trondheim, Norway
- Height: 1.80 m (5 ft 11 in)
- Position: Midfielder

Team information
- Current team: Yunnan Yukun
- Number: 30

Youth career
- 2007–2012: IL Trond
- 2013–2017: Rosenborg

Senior career*
Years	Team	Apps	(Gls)
2014–2017	Rosenborg	4	(0)
2016	→ Ranheim (loan)	9	(3)
2017–2019	Stabæk	32	(1)
2019–2022	Beijing Guoan	25	(3)
2023–2024	Ranheim	44	(20)
2025–	Yunnan Yukun	49	(6)

International career^{‡}
2013–2014	Norway U16	23	(8)
2014–2015	Norway U17	8	(3)
2014–2016	Norway U18	10	(0)
- * Club domestic league appearances and goals as of 11 October 2026 ‡ National team caps and goals as of 1 December 2019

John Hou Sæter
- Chinese: 侯永永
Transcriptions
Standard Mandarin
- Hanyu Pinyin: Hóu Yǒngyǒng
- IPA: [xǒʊ jʊ̌ŋ jʊ̀ŋ]

John Hou Sæter (born 13 January 1998), also known as Hou Yongyong (Chinese: 侯永永; pinyin: Hóu Yǒngyǒng) in China, is a Chinese professional footballer who plays as a midfielder for Chinese Super League club Yunnan Yukun.

== Club career ==
=== Early career ===
John Hou Sæter started his football career when he joined Rosenborg's youth academy in 2013. He made his debut for the club on 24 April 2014 in a 3–0 win against Orkla FK in the 2014 Norwegian Football Cup, becoming the youngest player ever to make his debut for Rosenborg aged 16 years and 101 days. He made his league debut on 28 September 2014 in a 3–0 win against Aalesund, coming on as a substitute in the 81st minute. He became the youngest player ever to make his league debut for the club aged 16 years and 258 days.

In August 2016, Hou Sæter signed a new two-year contract with Rosenborg before being loaned to Norwegian First Division side Ranheim until the end of the 2016 season. In July 2017, Hou Sæter transferred to fellow Tippeligaen side Stabæk.

=== Beijing Guoan ===
In January 2019, Hou Sæter obtained Chinese citizenship and joined Chinese Super League club Beijing Guoan. He made his debut for the club on 23 February 2019 in a 2–0 loss against Shanghai SIPG in the 2019 Chinese FA Super Cup, coming on as a substitute for Chi Zhongguo in the 71st minute. This made Hou Sæter the first naturalised Chinese player in China's professional leagues. On 29 May 2019, Hou scored his first goal for Guoan in a 3-1 home win against Changchun Yatai in a Chinese FA Cup fifth round match.

On 12 August 2020, Hou scored his first Chinese Super League goal in a 3-1 win against Hebei China Fortune.

Hou Sæter left the club at the end of the 2022 season and returned to Ranheim, after his contract with Guoan had ended.

=== Yunnan Yukun ===
On 26 January 2025, Hou Sæter returned to Chinese Super League by joining the new promoted club Yunnan Yukun.

== Personal life ==
Born to a Norwegian father and a Chinese mother from Luoyang, Henan, Hou Sæter's Chinese name is Hou Yongyong.

When Hou Sæter was 10 years old, he participated in an international football competition arranged by Manchester United. He was chosen as one of 37 from a group of about 20,000 participants to come attend the finale in Manchester. He finished second in the competition and received an award from Bobby Charlton, only beaten by a boy who was a year older than him.

He renounced his Norwegian passport in 2019 to receive the Chinese citizenship.

On 12 February 2025, FIFA approved his change of association from Norway to China.

== Career statistics ==
As of 11 October 2026.

Appearances and goals by club, season and competition
Club	Season	League			National Cup		Continental		Other		Total	
Club	Season	Division	Apps	Goals	Apps	Goals	Apps	Goals	Apps	Goals	Apps	Goals
Rosenborg	2014	Tippeligaen	1	0	1	0	–		–		2	0
Rosenborg	2015	Tippeligaen	3	0	4	0	3	0	–		10	0
Rosenborg	Total		4	0	5	0	3	0	–		12	0
Ranheim (loan)	2016	Norwegian First Division	9	3	0	0	–		–		9	3
Stabæk	2017	Eliteserien	9	1	2	1	–		–		11	2
Stabæk	2018	Eliteserien	23	0	2	0	–		–		25	0
Stabæk	Total		32	1	4	1	–		–		36	2
Beijing Guoan	2019	Chinese Super League	16	1	2	1	0	0	1 (Note: Appearances in Chinese FA Super Cup)	0	19	2
Beijing Guoan	2020	Chinese Super League	8	2	0	0	0	0	–		8	2
Beijing Guoan	2021	Chinese Super League	0	0	0	0	0	0	–		0	0
Beijing Guoan	2022	Chinese Super League	1	0	0	0	–		–		1	0
Beijing Guoan	Total		25	3	2	1	0	0	1	0	28	4
Ranheim	2023	OBOS-ligaen	15	1	0	0	–		–		15	1
Ranheim	2024	OBOS-ligaen	29	19	2	0	–		–		31	19
Ranheim	Total		44	20	2	0	–		–		46	20
Yunnan Yukun	2025	Chinese Super League	30	5	3	0	0	0	0	0	33	5
Yunnan Yukun	2026	Chinese Super League	19	1	2	0	0	0	0	0	21	1
Yunnan Yukun	Total		49	6	5	0	0	0	0	0	54	6
Career total			163	32	18	2	3	0	1	0	185	34

== Honours ==
Rosenborg

- Tippeligaen: 2015
- Norwegian Football Cup: 2015

Individual

- Norwegian First Division Player of the Month: September 2024
- Norwegian First Division Golden Boot: 2024
- Norwegian First Division Player of the Year 2024

== See also ==
- List of Chinese naturalized footballers
