= Li Jingrun =

Chinese association football player

Personal information
- Date of birth: 7 May 2000 (age 26)
- Height: 1.88 m (6 ft 2 in)
- Position: Defender

Team information
- Current team: Shijiazhuang Gongfu
- Number: 3

Youth career
- –2020: Beijing Guoan

Senior career*
Years	Team	Apps	(Gls)
2020–2021	Beijing Guoan	0	(0)
2021–2023	Xinjiang Tianshan Leopard	33	(0)
2023	Beijing IT	20	(1)
2024	Tai'an Tiankuang	21	(1)
2025	Ganzhou Ruishi	10	(0)
2025–	Shijiazhuang Gongfu	4	(0)
- * Club domestic league appearances and goals as of 10 March 2026

Li Jingrun (Chinese: 李京润; born 7 May 2000) is a Chinese footballer who plays as a defender for Shijiazhuang Gongfu.

== Career statistics ==
=== Club ===
As of 29 June 2021.

Club	Season	League			Cup		Continental		Other		Total	
Club	Season	Division	Apps	Goals	Apps	Goals	Apps	Goals	Apps	Goals	Apps	Goals
Beijing Guoan	2020	Chinese Super League	0	0	2 (Note: Appearances in the Chinese FA Cup)	0	0	0	0	0	2	0
Xinjiang Tianshan Leopard	2021	China League One	4	0	0	0	–		0	0	4	0
Career total			4	0	2	0	0	0	0	0	6	0
