= Yang Fan (footballer, born 1996) =

Chinese footballer

Yang Fan 杨帆
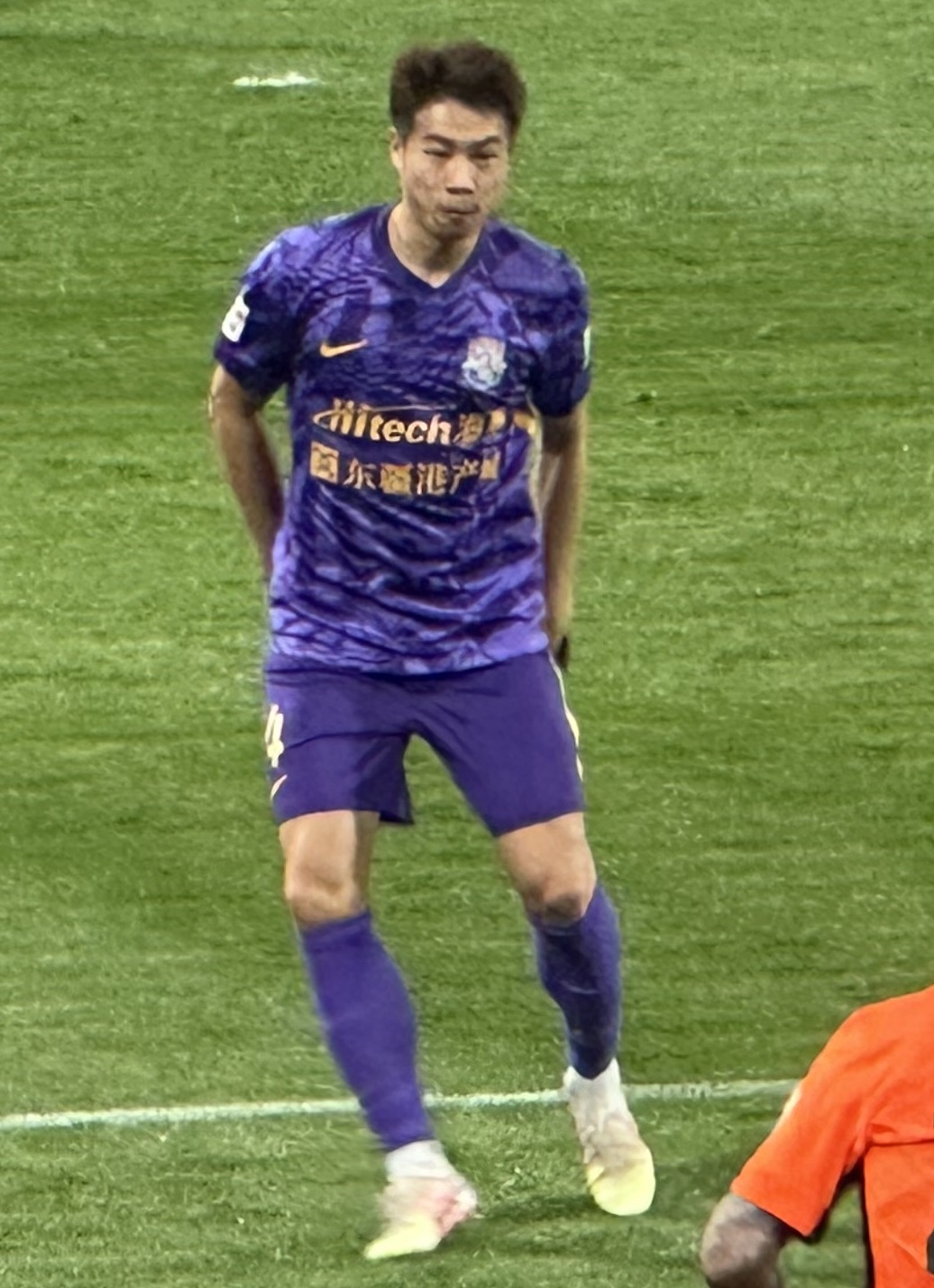
- Yang Fan in May 2025

Personal information
- Date of birth: 28 March 1996 (age 30)
- Place of birth: Xuzhou, Jiangsu, China
- Height: 1.82 m (5 ft 11 1/2 in)
- Position: Defender

Team information
- Current team: Tianjin Jinmen Tiger
- Number: 4

Youth career
- Tianjin Songjiang

Senior career*
| Years | Team | Apps | (Gls) |
| 2016–2018 | Yancheng Dingli | 36 | (0) |
| 2018–2020 | Tianjin TEDA | 50 | (0) |
| 2020–2023 | Beijing Guoan | 20 | (0) |
| 2022–2023 | → Tianjin Jinmen Tiger (loan) | 44 | (0) |
| 2024 | Chengdu Rongcheng | 5 | (0) |
| 2025– | Tianjin Jinmen Tiger | 46 | (0) |

International career^{‡}
| 2019– | China | 1 | (0) |
Medal record
Representing China
Men's football
EAFF Championship
| Bronze medal – third place | 2019 South Korea | Team |
- * Club domestic league appearances and goals as of 22 November 2026 ‡ National team caps and goals as of 3 February 2020

Yang Fan (Chinese: 杨帆; pinyin: Yáng Fān; born 28 March 1996) is a Chinese footballer who currently plays for Chinese Super League side Tianjin Jinmen Tiger.

== Club career ==
Yang Fan joined China League Two side Yancheng Dingli along with Tianjin Songjiang teammate Yang Wanshun in 2016. He was scouted by Chinese Super League side Tianjin TEDA manager Uli Stielike in the 2017 season. On 28 February 2018, he transferred to Tianjin TEDA after a successful trial. He made his debut for the club on 3 March 2018, playing the whole match in a 1–1 home draw against Hebei China Fortune.

On 3 February 2020, Beijing Guoan announced that Yang Fan would join the club.

== International career ==
On 15 December 2019 Yang Fan made his debut for the China national football team against South Korea in the 2019 EAFF E-1 Football Championship tournament that ended in a 1-0 defeat.

== Career statistics ==
As of 31 December 2025

| Club | Season | League | | | Cup | | Continental | | Other | | Total | |
| Club | Season | Division | Apps | Goals | Apps | Goals | Apps | Goals | Apps | Goals | Apps | Goals |
|---|---|---|---|---|---|---|---|---|---|---|---|---|
| Yancheng Dingli | 2016 | China League Two | 19 | 0 | 1 | 0 | - | | - | | 20 | 0 |
| Yancheng Dingli | 2017 | China League Two | 17 | 0 | 1 | 0 | - | | - | | 18 | 0 |
| Yancheng Dingli | Total | | 36 | 0 | 2 | 0 | 0 | 0 | 0 | 0 | 38 | 0 |
| Tianjin TEDA | 2018 | Chinese Super League | 24 | 0 | 2 | 0 | - | | - | | 26 | 0 |
| Tianjin TEDA | 2019 | Chinese Super League | 26 | 0 | 1 | 0 | - | | - | | 27 | 0 |
| Tianjin TEDA | Total | | 50 | 0 | 3 | 0 | 0 | 0 | 0 | 0 | 53 | 0 |
| Beijing Guoan | 2020 | Chinese Super League | 6 | 0 | 1 | 0 | 4 | 0 | – | | 11 | 0 |
| Beijing Guoan | 2021 | Chinese Super League | 14 | 0 | 1 | 0 | 0 | 0 | – | | 15 | 0 |
| Beijing Guoan | Total | | 20 | 0 | 2 | 0 | 4 | 0 | 0 | 0 | 26 | 0 |
| Tianjin Jinmen Tiger (loan) | 2022 | Chinese Super League | 22 | 0 | 0 | 0 | - | | - | | 22 | 0 |
| Tianjin Jinmen Tiger (loan) | 2023 | Chinese Super League | 22 | 0 | 3 | 0 | - | | - | | 25 | 0 |
| Tianjin Jinmen Tiger (loan) | Total | | 44 | 0 | 3 | 0 | 4 | 0 | 0 | 0 | 47 | 0 |
| Chengdu Rongcheng | 2024 | Chinese Super League | 5 | 0 | 2 | 0 | - | | - | | 7 | 0 |
| Tianjin Jinmen Tiger | 2025 | Chinese Super League | 24 | 0 | 2 | 0 | - | | - | | 26 | 0 |
| Career total | | | 179 | 0 | 14 | 0 | 4 | 0 | 0 | 0 | 197 | 0 |
