= Ba Dun =

Chinese footballer (born 1995)

Ba Dun 巴顿
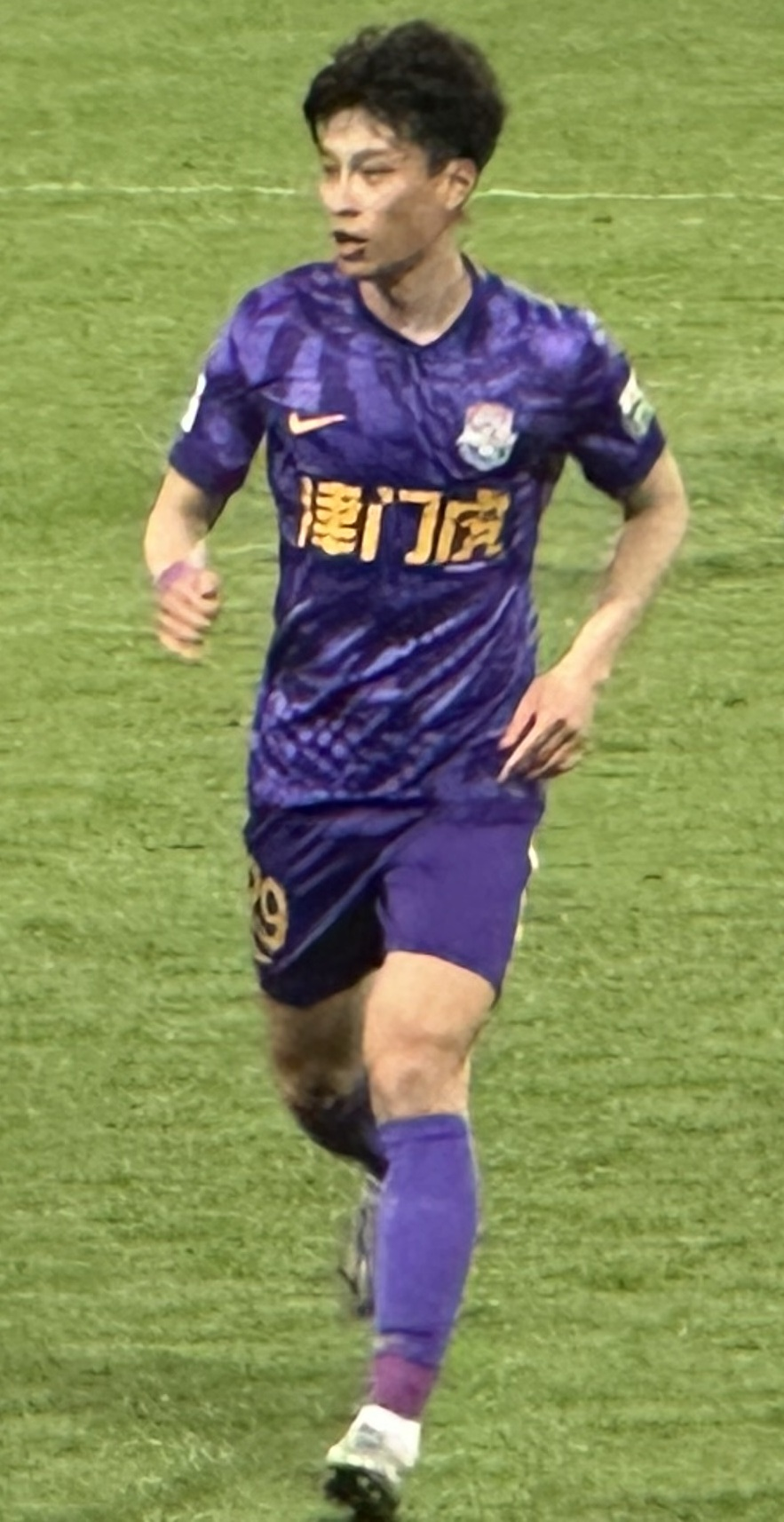
- Ba Dun in April 2025

Personal information
- Date of birth: 16 September 1995 (age 31)
- Place of birth: Yantai, Shandong, China
- Height: 1.81 m (5 ft 11 1/2 in)
- Position: Winger

Team information
- Current team: Tianjin Jinmen Tiger
- Number: 29

Youth career
- 2010–2014: Beijing Guoan

Senior career*
Years	Team	Apps	(Gls)
2014–2021	Beijing Guoan	49	(4)
2015–2016	→ Meizhou Hakka (loan)	13	(3)
2021	→ Tianjin Jinmen Tiger (loan)	20	(2)
2022–	Tianjin Jinmen Tiger	139	(13)

International career^{‡}
2017–2018	China U23	11	(0)
2021–	China	9	(1)
Medal record
Representing China
Men's football
EAFF Championship
Bronze medal – third place	2025 South Korea	Team
- * Club domestic league appearances and goals as of 22 November 2026 ‡ National team caps and goals as of 26 March 2023

Ba Dun (simplified Chinese: 巴顿; traditional Chinese: 巴頓; pinyin: Bā Dùn; born 16 September 1995) is a Chinese professional footballer who plays as a winger for Chinese Super League club Tianjin Jinmen Tiger and the China national team.

== Club career ==
Ba Dun started his professional football career in 2014 when he was promoted to Chinese Super League side Beijing Guoan's first team squad. He was loaned to China League Two side Meizhou Hakka for Half season in July 2015. Meizhou Hakka extended his loan deal for another season in January 2016 after they won promotion to China League One. He played just five league match in the 2016 season due to injury.

Ba returned to Beijing Guoan's first team in the 2017 season, which newly required at least one Under-23 player must be in the starting line-up. He gained the starter from Tang Shi after manager José González was sacked by the club. On 18 June 2017, he made his Super League debut in a 2–0 home win over Tianjin TEDA, assisting Renato Augusto's goal in the 60th minute. He scored his first goal for Beijing Guoan on 5 August 2017, in a 2–2 home draw against Shandong Luneng Taishan. Ba was a regular starter under caretaker manager Xie Feng and then Roger Schmidt. At the end of the 2017 season, he went on to make 17 appearances and scoring once in the Chinese Super League. On 24 April 2019, Ba scored his first AFC Champions League goal in a 2-0 home win against Buriram United in the group stage.

In April 2021, Ba joined fellow Chinese Super League club Tianjin Jinmen Tiger on loan for the 2021 season. He made his debut for Tianjin on 22 April 2021 in a 6-1 defeat against Shanghai Port, and scored his first goal for the club on 6 August 2021 in a 1-1 draw against Wuhan. On 22 January 2022, Ba joined Tianjin on a permanent deal.

== International career ==
On 16 November 2021, Ba made his international debut in a 1-1 draw against Australia in the 2022 FIFA World Cup qualification. On 26 March 2023, Ba scored his first international goal in a 2-1 away defeat against New Zealand.

== Career statistics ==
As of 31 December 2025.

Appearances and goals by club, season and competition
Club	Season	League			League Cup		Continental		Other		Total	
Club	Season	Division	Apps	Goals	Apps	Goals	Apps	Goals	Apps	Goals	Apps	Goals
Beijing Guoan	2014	Chinese Super League	0	0	0	0	0	0	-		0	0
Beijing Guoan	2015	Chinese Super League	0	0	0	0	0	0	-		0	0
Beijing Guoan	2017	Chinese Super League	17	1	1	0	-		-		18	1
Beijing Guoan	2018	Chinese Super League	20	1	4	0	-		-		24	1
Beijing Guoan	2019	Chinese Super League	9	1	2	0	4	1	0 (Note: Appearance in Chinese FA Super Cup)	0	15	2
Beijing Guoan	2020	Chinese Super League	3	1	0	0	5	0	-		8	1
Beijing Guoan	Total		49	4	7	0	9	1	0	0	65	5
Meizhou Hakka (loan)	2015	China League Two	8	3	0	0	-		-		8	3
Meizhou Hakka (loan)	2016	China League One	5	0	1	0	-		-		6	0
Meizhou Hakka (loan)	Total		13	3	1	0	0	0	0	0	14	3
Tianjin Jinmen Tiger (loan)	2021	Chinese Super League	20	2	0	0	-		-		20	2
Tianjin Jinmen Tiger	2022	Chinese Super League	24	7	0	0	-		-		24	7
Tianjin Jinmen Tiger	2023	Chinese Super League	30	4	1	0	-		-		31	4
Tianjin Jinmen Tiger	2024	Chinese Super League	30	2	3	0	-		-		33	2
Tianjin Jinmen Tiger	2025	Chinese Super League	26	0	1	0	-		-		27	0
Tianjin Jinmen Tiger	Total		110	13	5	0	0	0	0	0	115	13
Career total			192	22	13	0	9	1	0	0	214	23

=== International statistics ===
National team
Year	Apps	Goals
2021	1	0
2023	2	1
2025	3	0
2026	3	0
Total	9	1

Scores and results list China's goal tally first, score column indicates score after each Ba goal.

List of international goals scored by Ba Dun
No.	Date	Venue	Opponent	Score	Result	Competition
1	26 March 2023	Sky Stadium, Wellington, New Zealand	New Zealand	1–2	1–2	Friendly

== Honours ==
Beijing Guoan

- Chinese FA Cup: 2018
