= Wen Da =

Chinese association football player

Personal information
- Date of birth: 25 October 1999 (age 27)
- Height: 1.86 m (6 ft 1 in)
- Positions: Forward; winger; right-back

Team information
- Current team: Shanghai Second

Youth career
- –2020: Beijing Guoan

Senior career*
Years	Team	Apps	(Gls)
2020–2022	Beijing Guoan	1	(0)
2021	Beijing BSU (Loan)	21	(2)
2022	Wuhan Yangtze River	4	(0)
2023	Wuxi Wugou	12	(1)
2023	Qingdao Red Lions	10	(0)
2024	Cangzhou Mighty Lions	3	(0)
2025	Meizhou Hakka	6	(0)
2025	Suzhou Dongwu	13	(0)
2026–	Shanghai Second	0	(0)
- * Club domestic league appearances and goals as of 14:09, 8 March 2026 (UTC)

Wen Da (Chinese: 文达; born 25 October 1999) is a Chinese footballer who plays as a forward, winger or right-back for Shanghai Second.

== Club career ==
Wen Da was promoted to the senior team of Beijing Guoan in 2020 and made his debut in league game on 28 September against Shijiazhuang Ever Bright in a 4-0 victory. In the following season he was loaned out to second tier club Beijing BSU where he would make his debut in a league game on 25 April 2021 against Kunshan FC in a 2-2 draw. This was followed by his first career goal on 21 July in a league game against Meizhou Hakka.

On 26 April 2022, Wen transferred on a free to top tier club Wuhan Yangtze River. Used sparingly throughout in a disappointing season that saw the club relegated and dissolved due to financial difficulties. He go on to join second tier club Wuxi Wugou on a free transfer before having a short spell with third tier club Qingdao Red Lions where he won promotion with them at the end of the 2023 China League Two campaign.

On 27 February 2024, Wen transferred on a free to top tier club Cangzhou Mighty Lions. He went on to make his debut for the club as a converted right-back, in a league game on 2 March 2024 against Beijing Guoan in a 2-0 defeat.

On 25 January 2025, Wen joined fellow top tier club Meizhou Hakka.

== Career statistics ==
As of 29 March 2024.

Club	Season	League			Cup		Continental		Other		Total	
Club	Season	Division	Apps	Goals	Apps	Goals	Apps	Goals	Apps	Goals	Apps	Goals
Beijing Guoan	2020	Chinese Super League	1	0	0	0	0 (Note: Appearances in the AFC Champions League)	0	–		1	0
Beijing BSU (Loan)	2021	China League One	21	2	2	0	–		–		23	2
Wuhan Yangtze River	2022	Chinese Super League	4	0	1	0	–		–		5	0
Wuxi Wugou	2023	China League One	12	1	1	0	–		–		13	1
Qingdao Red Lions	2023	China League Two	10	0	0	0	–		–		10	0
Cangzhou Mighty Lions	2024	Chinese Super League	3	0	0	0	–		–		3	0
Career total			51	3	4	0	0	0	0	0	55	3
