= Jin Taiyan =

Chinese footballer (born 1989)

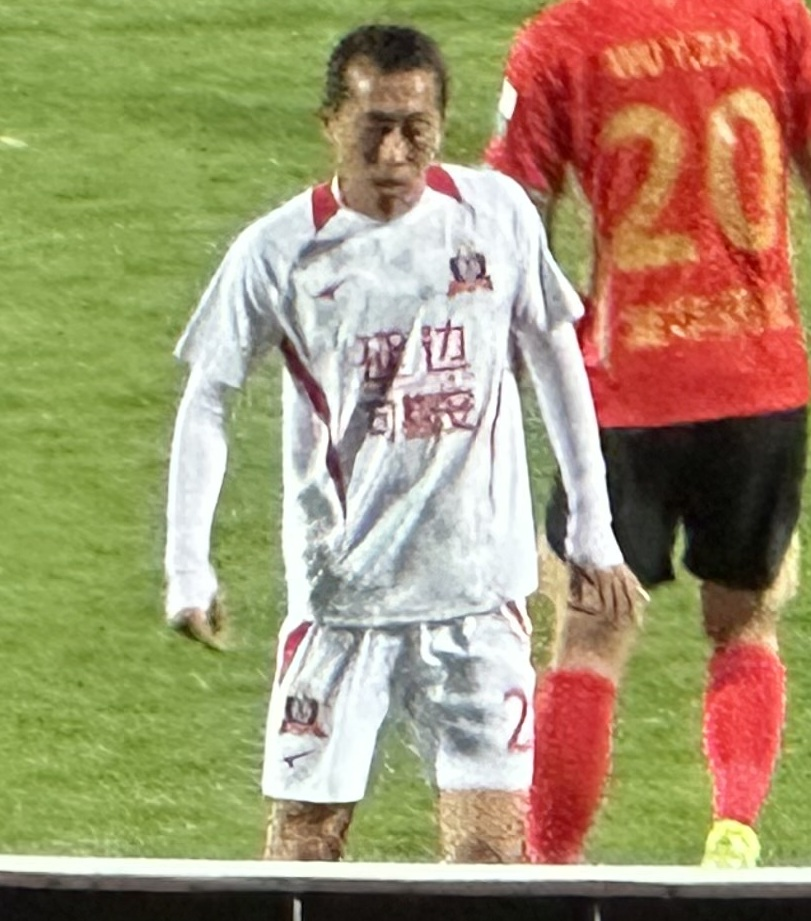
- Jin Taiyan in May 2025

Personal information
- Date of birth: 21 August 1989 (age 37)
- Place of birth: Yanbian, Jilin, China
- Height: 1.73 m (5 ft 8 in)
- Positions: Midfielder; full-back

Team information
- Current team: Yanbian Longding
- Number: 20

Youth career
- 2001–2009: Liaoning F.C.

Senior career*
Years	Team	Apps	(Gls)
2009	Panjin Mengzun	?	(?)
2010–2016	Liaoning Whowin	138	(8)
2017–2022	Beijing Guoan	75	(1)
2023–	Yanbian Longding	94	(5)
Chinese name
Chinese	金泰延
Transcriptions Standard Mandarin: Hanyu Pinyin: Jīn Tàiyán
Chinese Korean name
Chosŏn'gŭl	김태연
Hancha	金泰延
Transcriptions: Revised Romanization: Gim Taeyeon; McCune–Reischauer: Kim T'aeyŏn
- * Club domestic league appearances and goals as of 18 July 2026

Jin Taiyan (Chinese: 金泰延; pinyin: Jīn Tàiyán; born 21 August 1989) is a Chinese footballer who plays for Yanbian Longding in the China League One.

== Club career ==
Jin Taiyan started his football career in 2009 when he was loaned out to Liaoning Whowin's satellite team Panjin Mengzun for the 2009 league season. He was promoted to the club's first team in December 2009. He scored his first goal for the club on 31 March 2012 in a 1–1 away draw against Dalian Aerbin. Jin earned a predominantly starting role for the club for the entire 2013 season as he cemented his place in the first team.

On 29 January 2017, Jin moved to fellow Super League side Beijing Guoan. He would make his competitive debut on 15 April 2017 against Shandong Luneng in a 1–0 defeat where he came on as a substitute for Zhang Chiming. Under the Head coach José González, Jin would be a regular in the team until a string of disappointing results saw José González relieved of his duties. The following season saw the Head coach Roger Schmidt convert Jin into a full-back in a league game against Shanghai SIPG F.C. on 5 May 2018, which Beijing won 2–1. Used as versatile player throughout the season he would help the club go on the win the 2018 Chinese FA Cup against Shandong Luneng. He left Guoan at the end of the 2022 Chinese Super League season when his contract expired.

== Career statistics ==
Statistics accurate as of match played 18 July 2026.

Appearances and goals by club, season and competition
Club	Season	League			National Cup		Continental		Other		Total	
Club	Season	Division	Apps	Goals	Apps	Goals	Apps	Goals	Apps	Goals	Apps	Goals
Panjin Mengzun	2009	China League Two			-		-		-			
Liaoning Whowin	2010	Chinese Super League	9	0	-		-		-		9	0
Liaoning Whowin	2011	Chinese Super League	9	0	1	0	-		-		10	0
Liaoning Whowin	2012	Chinese Super League	19	1	1	0	-		-		20	1
Liaoning Whowin	2013	Chinese Super League	29	2	0	0	-		-		29	2
Liaoning Whowin	2014	Chinese Super League	18	0	1	0	-		-		19	0
Liaoning Whowin	2015	Chinese Super League	26	2	1	0	-		-		27	2
Liaoning Whowin	2016	Chinese Super League	28	3	0	0	-		-		28	3
Liaoning Whowin	Total		138	8	4	0	0	0	0	0	142	8
Beijing Guoan	2017	Chinese Super League	19	0	0	0	-		-		19	0
Beijing Guoan	2018	Chinese Super League	19	0	1	0	-		-		20	0
Beijing Guoan	2019	Chinese Super League	13	0	3	0	1	0	0 (Note: Appearances in Chinese FA Super Cup)	0	17	0
Beijing Guoan	2020	Chinese Super League	9	1	1	0	4	0	-		14	1
Beijing Guoan	2021	Chinese Super League	12	0	1	0	0	0	-		13	0
Beijing Guoan	2022	Chinese Super League	3	0	1	0	-		-		4	0
Beijing Guoan	Total		75	1	7	0	5	0	0	0	87	1
Yanbian Longding	2023	China League One	28	1	0	0	-		-		28	1
Yanbian Longding	2024	China League One	23	0	1	0	-		-		24	0
Yanbian Longding	2025	China League One	28	4	0	0	-		-		28	4
Yanbian Longding	2026	China League One	15	0	0	0	-		-		15	0
Yanbian Longding	Total		94	5	1	0	0	0	0	0	95	5
Career total			307	14	12	0	5	0	0	0	324	14

== Honours ==
=== Club ===
Beijing Guoan

- Chinese FA Cup: 2018.
