= Shen Yinhao =

Chinese football referee (born 1986)

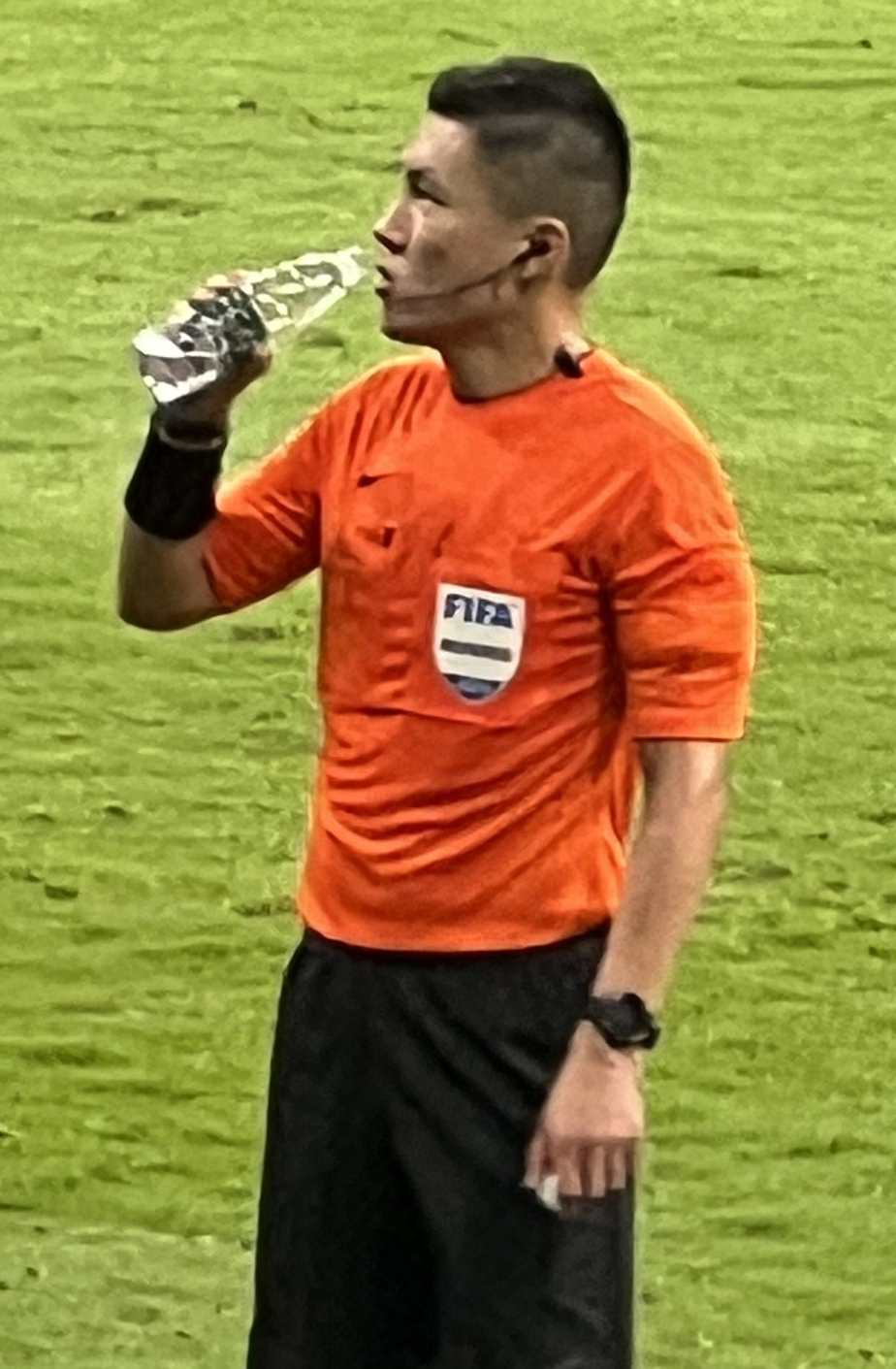
- Born: 6 November 1986 (age 39); Shanghai, China

Domestic
Years	League	Role
2016–	Chinese Super League	Referee

International
Years	League	Role
2018–	FIFA listed	Referee

Shen Yinhao
- Simplified Chinese: 沈寅豪
Transcriptions

Shen Yinhao (born 6 November 1986) is a Chinese football referee. He has been a full international referee for FIFA since 2018. Shen has also been involved in multiple criminal cases. In 2020, he was in the spotlight of Chinese football because his thesis was suspected of being plagiarized.

== Controversy ==
=== Criminal investigation into plagiarism ===
Shen has been involved in multiple criminal cases. In 2020, he was in the spotlight of Chinese football because his thesis was suspected of being plagiarized.

Based on a report from Hong Kong newspaper South China Morning Post in 2017, Shen Yinhao published a thesis entitled 'Causes and Management of Stress among College Referees'. However, it was revealed that a thesis with similar methods and studies had been published in 2012 by Lu Yunfei.

Another of Shen's doctoral thesis entitled 'Research on the current situation and development strategy of traditional schools in Shanghai City' is also suspected of plagiarizing Xuan Haide's work entitled 'Investigation of the current situation and overcoming the development of traditional football in Anhui Province'.

Tongji University, where Shen completed his master's and doctoral degrees, had launched an investigation into the case while Shen Yinhao served as deputy dean of the college's Football Academy. The impact of the case means that Shen Yinhao is threatened with severe punishment, including the potential revocation of his status as a referee by Chinese football authorities. It is known that in 2018, the government and the Chinese Communist Party tightened the rules regarding plagiarism. Documents from the Chinese Communist Party confirm that anyone who violates integrity will be held legally accountable.

However, amidst the controversy and criminal allegations, Shen Yinhao won the Bronze Peluti award in the Chinese A League in 2015.

=== AFC U-23 Asian Cup ===
While officiating of the AFC U-23 Asian Cup semi-final between Indonesia and Uzbekistan on 29 April 2024, Shen drew controversy for use of the Video Assistant Referee (VAR) system. Particularly in the disallowing of a goal by Muhammad Ferarri for offside, which was a major point of contention. Apart from annulling Muhammad Ferarri's goal, Shen also canceled a violation in the penalty box against midfielder Witan Sulaeman and gave a red card to Rizky Ridho via video assistant referee or VAR, with multiple experts citing that the VAR check did not comply with FIFA officiating standards.
