= 2021 Beijing Guoan F.C. season =

Beijing Guoan
2021 season
- CEO: Zhou Jinhui
- General Manager: Li Ming
- Manager: Slaven Bilić
- Stadium: Beijing Fengtai Stadium (Note: Fengtai Stadium serves as Guoan's home ground this season while the team's traditional home ground Workers' Stadium undergoes renovation.)
- Super League: 5th
- FA Cup: Fourth round
- AFC Champions League: Group stage
- Top goalscorer: League: Zhang Yuning (10); All: Zhang Yuning (10)
- Highest home attendance: 2,017 (vs Dalian Pro, 4 May 2021) (Note: Attendance was limited to mitigate potential impact of COVID-19. Home and away games are designations only as all teams competed and shared local stadiums and training facilities during each tournament stage .)
- Average home league attendance: 1,965
- Biggest win: 2–0 (4 May 2021 vs Dalian Pro, Super League) (10 May 2021 vs Wuhan, Super League); 4–2 (15 August 2021 vs Shanghai Shenhua, Super League)
- Biggest defeat: 0–7 (29 June 2021 vs Kawasaki Frontale, Champions League)
Home colours	Away colours

The 2021 season was Beijing Guoan F.C.'s 57th season in football competition and the club's 18th consecutive season in the Chinese Super League since the league's founding in the 2004. It was the team's 31st consecutive season in the top flight of Chinese football. It covered a period from 1 January 2021 to 4 January 2022.

== Summary ==
=== Pre-season ===
On 2 January, Toni Šunjić completed his transfer to Henan Jianye, the team he played for on loan after he was signed by Guoan in the summer of 2020. He did not cap for Guoan.

On 6 January, Guoan announced Slaven Bilić, former manager of the Croatia national team, West Ham United and West Bromwich Albion as the team's new manager. The team's contract with former manager Bruno Génésio lapsed at the end of the last season and was not renewed.

22 January saw Kim Min-Jae arrive in Guangzhou to begin his COVID-19 quarantine according to Chinese government regulations amid transfer rumors. He was the first foreign player to return ahead of the season. Bilić and his coaching staff landed in Hangzhou on 25 January for quarantine. Guoan's first training camp for the season began on 25 January in Kunming with only 11 first team players as many foreign players have yet to return or were undergoing quarantine according to Chinese regulations, and 7 first team members were training with the Chinese national team in Haikou. Chinese coaching staff led the training camp alongside reserve team players. The training camp ended on 9 February, and the team will regroup in Haikou for the next training camp after their lunar new year break.

On 8 February, the Asian Football Confederation announced that fellow CSL club Shandong Taishan was banned from this season's AFC Champions League due to finance-related violations. Guoan therefore no longer need to participate in the play-off round as it is set to take Shandong's spot in the group stage proper.

Guoan announced the singing of Cao Yongjing from Beijing Renhe on 9 February. He chose the number 37 shirt.

15 February saw Guoan regroup for its second winter training camp in Haikou. Players previously training with the Chinese national team have returned, and Bilić, along with his coaching staff, have completed the required quarantine and led the training sessions.

On 16 February, Guoan announced the signing of Gao Tianyi from Jiangsu. He was given the number 15 shirt. Guoan announced the transfer of Zhang Yu to Changchun Yatai on 25 February. Further, Dongda He joined from the U23 team at Wolverhampton Wanderers on 26 February. He will be wearing number 28.

Bakambu returned to China on 2 March while the return date of Augusto, Viera and Fernando remains uncertain. On 5 March, Bakambu announced via his personal social media accounts that he has tested for COVID-19. Guoan released a statement later, confirming that Bakambu is without symptoms and currently receiving treatment.

The team concluded its Hainan training camp on 5 March, having won three friendlies against teams training locally. Head coach Bilić, recounting the training camp, said that he was satisfied with "the weather, the pitch, the training facility as well as the players' mentality." "We have a bright future," commented Bilić on the talent of the Guoan reserve team that trained with the first team.

The team's third training camp began in Shanghai on 11 March and concluded on 25 March. The fourth training camp and the last before the beginning of the season on 20 April began on 30 March. Bakambu, fully recovered, joined the training along with Viera, who returned to China mid-March and completed his quarantine.

The Chinese FA announced the competition format for this season's Chinese Super League on 1 April. There will be three stages, with the first stage seeing participating teams divided into two groups competing in Guangzhou and Suzhou respectively. Guoan is placed into group B alongside Shanghai Port, Shanghai Shenhua and Wuhan amongst other teams and will compete in Suzhou.

On 10 April, Guoan announced the loan of Lucas Souza from Changchun Yatai and the singing of Bai Yang.

==== Name change ====
On 14 December 2020, the Chinese Football Association officially mandated that all clubs must remove references to investors and the companies that own them in their name and instead adopt "neutral" names before the beginning of the 2021 season. Under this regulation, Guoan need to drop Sinobo, a Chinese real estate investment company and the club's majority owner, from its name. Further, the club must change its name, Guoan, as CITIC Guoan Group still owns partial share in the club.

The club, its owners, and its fans have objected the name change as all parties feel the name "Guoan" is part of the club's identity. All clubs must submit their new name to the Chinese FA for approval by 31 December 2020; instead of submitting a new name, Guoan submitted a petition to delay name change on the grounds that Sinobo Group is negotiating a deal to purchase the club's remaining shares from CITIC Guoan. If the purchase is completed, the name "Guoan" will no longer directly reference the club's owner, which may avert the need for a new club name.

On 21 January, reports emerged that the Chinese FA demanded Guoan to show concrete proof of the purchase negotiation process by 31 January, otherwise the club must adopt a different name for the upcoming season. Further difficulties during the purchase negotiations process was reported on 26 January. The report claims that due to CITIC being a Chinese state-owned enterprise, ownership transfer requires a more complicated process, and that the parties involved could not agree over the transaction cost.

On 29 January, the China Beijing Equity Exchange published a notice outlining the club's intended ownership transfer from CITIC to Sinobo for ¥1, successfully meeting Chinese FA's 31 January deadline. However, reports emerged on 3 February that the ownership transfer would require Sinobo to shoulder an additional debt of ¥600 million, stalling the transfer and increasingly the likelihood that the club would have to take up a new name.

During a television interview with CCTV reporter Bai Yansong on 19 March, the president of Chinese FA Chen Xuyuan stated that it is likely for Guoan to keep its name provided the ownership transfer occurs without incident.

On 25 March, the club's name changed from "Beijing Sinobo Guoan" to "Beijing Guoan" according to official company registration database, signaling a high likelihood that the name "Guoan" is compliant with relevant Chinese FA regulations and hence marked an end of the name change saga.

The ownership transfer process was completed on 21 June according to an official club statement, making Sinobo Group the sole owner of the club. The club name "Guoan" is kept.

=== April ===
On 23 April, Guoan suffered a resounding defeat against Shanghai Shenhua in the season opener. Despite having 67% possession, the team struggled against taller opposition strikers, and managed only 6 shots in comparison to Shenhua's 14. After a first half with highlights from both sides, Shenhua's Moreno broke the deadlock on the 59th minute with a header at the end of a corner situation, which Guoan defended haphazardly throughout the game. Wu Xi added another for Shenhua in the 65th with a strike at the edge of the penalty area. In the 91st minute, Li Ke advanced the ball up the pitch from the right flank before threading it across the opposition penalty area; Li Lei slipped the ball passed Shenhua's keeper for a consolation goal. The game ended as a 2–1 loss for Guoan.

Guoan suffered a 3–1 defeat against Shanghai Port on Matchday 2 on 28 April. Head coach Bilić attempted a new tactic by selecting a three-defender backline with the hopes of increasing aggression and allowing for more players to join the attack, but the experiment failed as Shanghai Port's Lopes scored a quickfire double inside the first four minutes of the game. Guoan pulled a goal back in the 21st minute with a quick counter attack that originated from a Gao Tianyi and ended with Viera sliding the ball past Port's keeper off a Bakambu through ball assist. Cao Yongjing came on for Li Lei at the beginning of the second half as Guoan continued to push for a second goal, and Souza made his debut for the team in the 78th minute replacing injured defender Kim Min-Jae. However, Guoan's positive momentum was undone in the 80th minute as Port's Lü Wenjun scored a header. With two consecutive losses, Guoan suffered its worst start of any CSL campaign since the league's conception. Guoan has not lost two games in a row at the start of the season since 2000, when the team played in the Chinese Jia-A League under head coach Milovan Đorić, who was fired after losing the opening three games.

=== May ===
Guoan's first victory of the season came when they defeated Dalian Pro 2–0 on 4 May on Matchday 3. First half saw action from both sides but neither were able to score a goal. Viera was substituted for injury in the 39th minute and was sent to a local hospital at halftime for evaluation from what appeared to be a serious knee injury. Guoan grabbed the lead in the 52nd minute with Zhang Xizhe powering a Zhang Yuning cross from the left flank into the box past the opposition keeper. Two minutes later, Zhang Xizhe scored an almost identical goal, except with his head this time, from a similar movement. Li Lei provided the assist. The second yellow card for opposition player Tong Lei in the 73rd minute sealed the win for Guoan. Viera was diagnosed with right knee MCL and meniscus injury the next day and is expected to miss several games.

Kim Min-jae temporarily left the team on 9 May due to a family member suffering from serious health problem. Adding to the misfortune, Bilić reported on the same day during the pre-match press conference against Wuhan that defender Yu Yang suffered a rib fracture and will be sidelined for extended periods.

The injury-riddled Guoan played Wuhan on Matchday 4 on 10 May. Zhang Yuning drew an early penalty in the 3rd minute which Bakambu prompted converted. The two combined again in the 46th minute to score Guoan's second goal of the game with Bakambu following through a deflected shot from Zhang. Despite failing to won a single corner, Guoan held the 0–2 lead to the end of the game. The match also marked Li Lei's 100th appearance for the club. With multiple players receiving call-ups from the Chinese national team, the Matchday 5 game against Hebei is postponed until a later date, giving the team a 40-day break. AFC also announced on the same day that this season's Champions League group stage games for group H and I, which includes Guoan, will be played in Uzbekistan between 25 June and 11 July.

The team regrouped on 20 May in Beijing and began preparation for the next stage of CSL competitions. Piao Cheng joined the whole team in training for the first time after recovering from a torn ACL suffered on 1 August 2020.

=== June ===
Due to complications regarding China's COVID-19 quarantine rules for foreigners and COVID cases discovered within the Maldives and Syrian national teams, the venue for China's remaining second round matches in the 2022 World Cup Asian qualification was moved from China to the UAE. The travel and the subsequent mandatory quarantine requirements upon return meant that it was extremely unlikely for the CSL, scheduled to resume on 21 June, to proceed as planned after the national team's game on 15 June. Although no official announcement has been made, the absence of CSL matches on their planned dates signifies that the league is currently delayed.

On 18 June, Guoan's AFC Champions League squad traveled to Uzbekistan ahead of the upcoming group stage games. Due to overlapping schedule with the CSL and the Chinese government's mandatory 14-day quarantine after returning from a foreign country, Guoan's team consisted mostly of reserve squad players. The 21-player squad included four younger first-team players, Guo Quanbo, Li Boxi, Xie Longfei and Jiang Wenhao, and the average age is only 20.9 years. Zoran Janković, the reserve team head coach, served as the manager.

Guoan's young players stood the test in the first game of Group I against United City on 26 June. Despite conceding in the 28th minute, generating only 3 shots in comparison to the opponent's 19, and retaining only 26% of total possession, Liang Shaowen managed to bend a free kick past the opposition goalkeeper to tie the game 1–1 in the 73rd minute from a foul committed to stop Naibijiang's dribble. Guoan thus avoided a loss and earned a precious point, rising to third in the group. Liang, at 19 years and 14 days, became the youngest Guoan player to score in an AFC Champions League game; Ma Yujun became the youngest Guoan player to feature in a Champions League game at 18 years and 131 days.

The youngsters, however, were outclassed by reigning J1 League champion Kawasaki Frontale in the second group stage game on 29 June. Unbeaten in over seven months in all competitions, Kawasaki netted 7 times with 6 different players in 56 minutes with Guoan failing to score. The 0–7 loss marked the largest defeat suffered by a Chinese club in AFC Champions League history.

=== July ===
In the third AFC Champions League group stage game against K League 1 club Daegu FC, Guoan's youngsters put up a fair fight in the early minutes. Leng Jixuan dragged a shot just wide of the goal in the 10th minute, and Gao Jian managed to hit the post in the 13th. The young players, however, were unsuccessful in defending the 22 shots Daegu generated over the course of the entire match, eventually losing 0–5.

In the second match-up against Daegu on 5 July, the inexperienced Guoan lost 0–3 despite a defense-first approach. The last opposition goal came as a result of Liang Shaowen deflecting the ball into Guoan's own net. With only one point after four matches, it became impossible for Guoan to advance to the elimination phase of this season's AFC Champions League. On the same day, the Chinese FA also announced schedule changes to the Super League and the Chinese FA Cup. The CSL calendar is shortened to 22 matchdays from the original 30. The top four teams from Group A and B respectively after 14 matchdays will qualify for the championship group, which will consist of 8 matchdays as the teams from one group play only the teams from the other group twice. The winner of the championship group will be crowned as champions. The first CSL stage will resume on 15 July and is scheduled to end on 12 August, and the championship stage will take place between 1 December 2021 and 3 January 2022. Further, Guoan is now scheduled to join the 2021 Chinese FA Cup in the first round beginning on 16 October along with 31 other teams. All rounds will be single-elimination except for the semi-finals, in which two games will be play between the competing teams.

Guoan faced United City for their second matchup in the AFC Champions League group stage on 8 July. Jiang Wenhao fired a shot passed the opposition keeper after only 39 seconds, and Leng Jixuan doubled Guoan's lead 3 minutes later cutting inside from the right flank and rounding the opposition defender and goalkeeper. Guoan failed to maintain the advantage, however, in the second half, giving up two goals from free kick situations and one more from a rapid counted directly after Leng Jixuan hit the post. Guoan lost the game 2–3, slipping to last place in the group with five games played.

In the final group match game against Kawasaki Frontale on 11 July, Guoan conceded two goals in each half, losing the game 0–4.

Guoan re-signed Jiang Tao, whose contract with the club ended at the end of the previous season but has failed to secure a new club, on 13 July ahead of the upcoming compact CSL schedule that will see Guoan play a match every three days for a month. His old shirt number 28 was taken and he has thus opted for number 29.

Guoan returned to league action on 16 July against Hebei. Both team traded chances as the heavy rain disrupted the ball movement in first half, but neither were able to score. The deadlock was broken in the 51st minute with Zhang Yuning converting a penalty won by himself after an over-the-top Chi Zhongguo pass into the penalty area forced the opposition goalkeeper to commit a foul. Guoan doubled the lead in the 83rd minute after Zhang Xizhe scored another penalty from a foul committed on Yu Dabao as he lunged forward to contest a loose ball in the box. The eventual 2–1 victory helped the team move up to second in Group A. Three days later, Guoan played Tianjin Jinmen Tiger in the CSL. Despite 20 shots with 8 on target, Guoan drew the match 0–0.

On 22 July, vice-captain Renato Augusto's contract was terminated via mutual consent as he was unable to return to China due to China's COVID-19 restrictions. He bid farewell to the club via a heart-warming message on his personal Instagram account. Considering his time at the club "a privilege," he went on to thank the players, staff and fans. Since his arrival in January 2016, he capped for the club 152 times, scoring 40 and assisting another 45; he was a crucial part of the 2019 team that won the Chinese FA cup. He signed with Corinthians on the same day. Later in the day, Guoan lost 0–2 to Changchun Yatai in the CSL despite almost 70% possession. Piao Cheng, injured since August 2020, made his first competitive debut this season.

Guoan resumed their CSL campaign on 28 July against Shanghai Port after the matchday 8 game against Shanghai Shenhua was delayed to August due to inclement weather caused by Typhoon In-fa. In the 60th minute, Li Lei's mistimed challenge allowed the opposition a series of passes on the left side that eventually resulted in a goal. Searching for more directness, Bilić pushed Yu Dabao, who started the game as a center-back, to the front. This change eventually led to Yu scoring a header in the 88th minute at the end of a Li Lei cross. The game ended in a 1–1 draw.

On 30 July, Guoan signed Anderson Silva from Famalicão in the Primeira Liga. A day later, Souza left the team as his loan expired. The same day saw Guoan play Dalian in the CSL. After a scrappy first half, Piao won a penalty in the 73rd minute following a set piece situation. Bakambu converted the penalty and helped Guoan secure the 1–0 victory, snapping a three-game winless streak for the team.

=== August ===
The first game in August was against Wuhan on 3 August. Bakambu scored two early goals for Guoan: sending the keeper the wrong way after a long through ball from Gao Tianyi in the 15th minute, and tapping in a Zhang Yuning pullback in the 20th. Both Bakambu and Zhang Yuning had open looks in the second half, but neither was able to convert their chances. Guoan conceded in the 67th minute from a set piece situation as the ball slipped in Hou Sen's hands, but held on well against a late Wuhan surge and ended the game with a 2–1 victory. In the 6 August game against Hebei, goalkeeper Hou Sen put on a magnificent performance and denied the opposition multiple scoring chances. However, Guoan failed to convert its own chances towards the end of the game after a passive first hour, ending the match in a 0–0 draw.

Turkish club Fenerbahçe announced on 7 August via their official Twitter account that it entered contract negotiations with Kim Min-jae and had scheduled a medical with him on 8 August in Turkey, essentially solidifying the immediate departure of the Korean international. The transfer was made official on 13 August according to an official club announcement via social media. On 9 August, Guoan suffered a resounding 3–1 defeat at the hands of Tianjin Jinme Tiger. Bilić opted for a rotation in the game, sitting Li Lei, Wang Gang and Yu Dabao and instead named Liu Huan, Jiang Tao and Bai Yang in the starting eleven. After conceding in the 33rd minute, Bilić substituted the starters back on in an attempt to bolster midfield control and strengthen the attack. This attempt led to a Zhang Yuning goal from a floated cross by Gao Tianyi in the 64th minute. However, Yang Fan failed to deal with an opposition player breaking through on Guoan's right flank, leading to a second opposition goal. In a chaotic ending minutes, both Guoan's Chi Zhongguo and Tianjin's Bai Yuefeng received straight reds, and Guoan conceded again after Li Lei was forced to give a penalty to stop an opposition attack. Guoan fell to 5th in Group A after the loss.

Guoan played Changchun Yatai on 12 August in the second to last matchday of the CSL qualification stage. After an exciting first half with chances for both sides, Zhang Yuning broke the deadlock heading in a Bakambu shot that hit the crossbar in the 53rd minute. Yatai leveled the game in the 73rd after a corner situation caused confusion in front of Guoan's goal. In the 83rd minute, Wang Ziming scored what was seemingly the goal that could help Guoan secure the game and celebrated by taking off his shirt, but VAR review ruled the goal offside and he received a yellow card for the celebration. Guoan ramped up its attack and finally took the lead again with Zhang Yuning heading in a cross from a freekick flicked on by Yu Dabao. With the precious 2–1 win, Guoan maintained the hope of qualifying for the champions group in the next stage as the team is one point behind Shanghai Shenhua, the next and last matchday's opponent.

With champion hopes on the line, Guoan faced rival Shanghai Shenhua on 15 August. Just 6 minutes into the game, Zhang Yuning took advantage of a botched opposition clearance and sliced the ball cleanly into the net. 5 minutes later, Bakambu was fouled in the box and Zhang Xizhe calmly put it past the opposition keeper. In the 16th minute, Wang Gang's pull back cross found Shenhua's defender, who turned in into his own goal for a 3–0 Guoan lead. Shenhua pulled one back during the first half stoppage time, but Zhang Yuning sealed the game in the 81st minute after noticing that he was unmarked in the opposition box. Running onto a Bai Yang pass, Zhang calmly scored Guoan's fourth. With a 4–2 victory, Guoan secured 3rd in qualification stage group A, qualifying for the championship stage.

Guoan announced on 18 August that it has terminated the contract of Fernando after friendly discussion as he was unable to return to China due to the country's strict COVID-19 quarantine regulations. The club and Jonathan Viera negotiated a termination of his contract half a year in advance on 23 August, allowing him to signed for hometown club Las Palmas.

=== October ===
After an extended break and training camps, Guoan returned to play action on 14 October against China League One Sichuan Jiuniu in the first round in the Chinese FA Cup. Wang Ziming opened the scoring in the 29th minute on a Cao Yongjing counter, but Jiuniu equalized in the second half, bringing the game into penalties. Wang Ziming, Liu Huan and Yang Fan all failed to convert, losing Guoan the penalty shootout 2–3.

=== November ===
Anderson Silva joined the team on 2 November after completing quarantine. On 30 November, during the extended break in the China Super League due to national team competitions and Chinese quarantine requirements for people who have traveled abroad, Guoan announced the departure of record goalscorer Cédric Bakambu.

=== December ===
Guoan's league campaign resumed on 13 December against Guangzhou, which Guoan won 1–0 thanks to a Zhang Yuning header from a Gao Tianyi corner in the 83rd minute.

On 16 December, Guoan played Shandong. Zhang Yuning scored in the 73rd minute after the opposition defender failed to clear a pass from Gao Tianyi, making Zhang the first Chinese player to score in 5 consecutive matches for the club. However, Guoan went on to concede twice before the end of the match, losing 1–2. Wang Gang also suffered a broken right arm during the game that later required hospital operation, sidelining him for games to come.

Guoan's league campaign continued on 19 December against Guangzhou City. Despite a 68-32 advantage in possession throughout the game and having generated 19 shots with 7 on target, Guoan conceded twice in the opening 8 minutes and lost the game 0–5, tying the team's record for worst domestic defeat and setting a new record for the worst league defeat. A day later on 20 December, Li Lei announced his departure to join Grasshopper Club Zürich after the completion of Guoan's season.

On 22 December, Guoan played against Shenzhen. Silva opened the scoring for Guoan after tapping in his own shot that bounced off the post from a Li Lei cross in the 10th minute. Silva also forced Shenzhen's Zhou Xin to commit a foul that saw the latter sent off in the 12th minute, but the man advantage did not last long as Jin Pengxiang received a red card too just six minutes later. Minutes after Guoan conceded, Gao Tianyi threaded a pass to Zhang Yuning, who dribbled past the defender and took the lead for Guoan again in the 70th minute. The lead did not last to the end, however, with Guoan conceding from a 89th minute Shenzhen corner. The game ended 2–2.

Guoan's woes continued on 26 December with a 0–1 loss to Guangzhou, taking Guoan's winless streak up to four games. On the same matchday, Shandong Taishan claimed the CSL title. Guoan closed out the year with a 1–1 tie against Shandong on 29 December. Silva capitalized on a Shandong mistake in the 17th minute to take the lead, but Guoan was unable to hold on to the lead and conceded in the 28th minute. The match was also Li Lei's last for Guoan before leaving for Grasshopper Zürich.

=== January 2022 ===
The last games of the 2021 season were played in early January 2022. Guoan extended its winless streak to 6 games with a 1–1 tie against Guangzhou City on 1 January. Zhang Yuning converted a penalty earned by Silva in the 39th minute to give Guoan the lead before the team conceded an outside-the-box goal.

Guoan's finished the last game of the season against Shenzhen on 4 January with a 1–0 victory. Cao Yongjing missed a penalty he won in the 2nd minute, but scored in the 11th to make up for the mistake. Guoan ended the season fifth in the Chinese Super League. With 10 goals scored, Zhang Yuning ends the season as the joint top Chinese goalscorer.

== Players ==
As of 23 August 2021

Note: Flags indicate national team as defined under FIFA eligibility rules; some limited exceptions apply. Players may hold more than one non-FIFA nationality.

No.	Pos.	Nation	Player
1	GK	CHN	Hou Sen
3	DF	CHN	Yu Yang
4	DF	CHN	Li Lei
6	MF	CHN	Chi Zhongguo
7	MF	CHN	Hou Yongyong (Note: Upon joining the club, player became naturalized Chinese citizen)
8	MF	CHN	Piao Cheng
9	FW	CHN	Zhang Yuning
10	MF	CHN	Zhang Xizhe
11	FW	BRA	Anderson Silva
14	GK	CHN	Zou Dehai
15	MF	CHN	Gao Tianyi
16	DF	CHN	Jin Pengxiang
18	DF	CHN	Jin Taiyan
19	DF	CHN	Liu Huan
20	FW	CHN	Wang Ziming
22	FW	CHN	Yu Dabao (Captain)

No.	Pos.	Nation	Player
23	MF	CHN	Li Ke
24	DF	CHN	Yang Fan
25	GK	CHN	Guo Quanbo
26	MF	CHN	Bai Yang
27	DF	CHN	Wang Gang
28	FW	CHN	He Zhenyu (on loan from (England) Wolverhampton Wanderers)
29	DF	CHN	Jiang Tao
31	FW	CHN	Li Boxi
32	MF	CHN	Liu Guobo
33	GK	CHN	Ma Kunyue
35	MF	CHN	Jiang Wenhao
36	DF	CHN	Liang Shaowen
37	MF	CHN	Cao Yongjing
38	DF	CHN	Ruan Qilong
39	MF	CHN	Xie Longfei
40	FW	CHN	Gao Jian

== Transfers ==
=== In ===
#	Position	Nationality	Name	Age	Moving from	Type	Transfer Window	Ends	Fee	Source
	DF	(Bosnia and Herzegovina)	Toni Šunjić	32	(China) Henan Jianye	End of loan	Winter	2022	Free	
19	DF	(China)	Liu Huan	31	(China) Chongqing Lifan	End of loan	Winter	2022	Free	
	DF	(China)	Zhang Yu	26	(China) Changchun Yatai	End of loan	Winter	2021	Free	
37	MF	(China)	Cao Yongjing	23	(China) Beijing Renhe	Transfer	Winter	2023	Free	
15	MF	(China)	Gao Tianyi	22	(China) Jiangsu	Transfer	Winter	2023	¥7.5M	
28	FW	(China)	He Zhenyu	19	(England) Wolverhampton Wanderers	Loan	Winter	2021	Undisclosed	
30	MF	(Brazil)	Lucas Souza	30	(China) Changchun Yatai	Loan	Winter	2021	Undisclosed	
26	MF	(China)	Bai Yang	22	Free transfer	Transfer	Winter	2024	Free	
29	DF	(China)	Jiang Tao	31	Free transfer	Transfer	Summer		Free	
11	FW	(Brazil)	Anderson Silva	23	(Portugal) Famalicão	Transfer	Summer		¥14M	

=== Out ===
#	Position	Nationality	Name	Age	Moving to	Type	Transfer Window	Fee	Source
19	FW	(China)	A Lan	31	(China) Guangzhou Evergrande	End of loan	Winter	Free	
	DF	(Bosnia and Herzegovina)	Toni Šunjić	32	(China) Henan Jianye	Transfer	Winter	¥17M	
28	DF	(China)	Jiang Tao	31		End of contract	Winter	Free	
26	MF	(China)	Lü Peng	31	(China) Qingdao	End of contract	Winter	Free	
	DF	(China)	Zhang Yu	26	(China) Changchun Yatai	Transfer	Winter	Undisclosed	
29	MF	(China)	Ba Dun	25	(China) Tianjin Jinmen Tiger	Loan	Winter	Undisclosed	
39	FW	(China)	Wen Da	21	(China) Beijing Sport University	Loan	Winter	Undisclosed	
5	MF	(Brazil)	Renato Augusto	32	(Brazil) Corinthian	Contract terminated	Summer	Undisclosed	
30	MF	(Brazil)	Lucas Souza	30	(China) Changchun Yatai	End of loan	Summer	Undisclosed	
2	DF	(South Korea)	Kim Min-jae	24	(Turkey) Fenerbahçe	Transfer	Summer	¥23M	
	MF	(Brazil)	Fernando	28		Contract terminated	Summer	Undisclosed	
21	MF	(Spain)	Jonathan Viera	31	(Spain) Las Palmas	Contract terminated	Summer	Undisclosed	
17	FW	(Democratic Republic of the Congo)	Cédric Bakambu	29	(France) Marseille	Contract terminated	Winter	Free	

== Friendlies ==
3 February 2021 Friendly	Beijing Guoan	1–0	(China) Kunming Zheng He Shipman	Kunming, China
	Bai Yunfei

8 February 2021 Friendly	Beijing Guoan	2–0	(China) Guizhou	Kunming, China
	Wang Ziming; Chen Yanpu

20 February 2021 Friendly	Beijing Guoan	3–0	(China) Shandong Taishan Reserve	Haikou, China
	Wang Ziming; Liu Huan; Li Boxi

27 February 2021 Friendly	Beijing Guoan	2–1	(China) Shandong Taishan	Haikou, China
	Gao Tianyi; Liu Guobo (pen.)		Wu Xinghan

4 March 2021 Friendly	Beijing Guoan	2–0	(China) Kunshan	Haikou, China
	Wang Ziming; Gao Tianyi

20 March 2021 Friendly	Beijing Guoan	2–3	(China) Nantong Zhiyun	Shanghai, China
	Wang Ziming; Cao Yongjing		(o.g.); Chagas; Zheng Haoqian

24 March 2021 Friendly	Beijing Guoan	0–0	(China) Zhejiang Professional	Shanghai, China

4 April 2021 Friendly	Beijing Guoan	1–1	(China) Changchun Yatai	Shanghai, China
	Wang Ziming		Negrão

13 April 2021 Friendly	Beijing Guoan	3–0	(China) Beijing BIT	Beijing, China
	Bakambu; Jiang Wenhao			Stadium: Beijing Fengtai Stadium

15 April 2021 Friendly	Beijing Guoan	2–0	(China) Tianjin Jinmen Tiger	Beijing, China
	Bakambu			Stadium: Beijing Fengtai Stadium

7 July 2021 Friendly	Beijing Guoan	2–1	(China) Shandong Taishan	Shanghai, China
	Li Lei; Souza		Leonardo

2 October 2021 Friendly	Beijing Guoan	2–0	(China) Wuxi Wugou	Shanghai, China
	Piao Cheng; He Xiaoqiang

7 October 2021 Friendly	Beijing Guoan	0–1	(China) Tianjin Jinmen Tiger	Beijing, China
			Wang Jianan	Stadium: Beijing Fengtai Stadium

13 November 2021 Friendly	Beijing Guoan	0–1	(China) Tianjin Jinmen Tiger	Beijing, China
			Qiu Tianyi

30 November 2021 Friendly	Beijing Guoan	3–1	(China) Changchun Yatai	Shanghai, China
	Cao Yongjing (pen.); Piao Cheng

7 December 2021 Friendly	Beijing Guoan	2–5	(China) Shanghai Port	Shanghai, China
			Mooy 3'; Paulinho 6'; Oscar 60'; Li Ang 65'; Mirahmetjan Muzepper 84'

== Competitions ==
=== Overview ===
Competition	First match	Last match	Starting round	Final position	Record							
Competition	First match	Last match	Starting round	Final position	Pld	W	D	L	GF	GA	GD	Win %
Chinese Super League	23 April 2021	4 January 2022	Matchday 1	5th	22	9	6	7	26	28	−2	40.91
Chinese FA Cup	14 October 2021	14 October 2021	Fourth round	Fourth round	1	0	1	0	1	1	+0	0.00
AFC Champions League	26 June 2021	11 July 2021	Group stage	Group stage	6	0	1	5	3	23	−20	0.00
Total					29	9	8	12	30	52	−22	31.03

Last updated: 4 January 2022
Source: Soccerway

=== Chinese Super League ===
This season's Chinese Super League was planned to take place in three stages. In the first stage, the 16 participating teams were divided into two groups competing in Guangzhou and Suzhou respectively, with Guoan in group B alongside Shanghai Port, Shanghai Shenhua and Wuhan amongst other teams. Stage one consisted of 14 rounds as teams play each other twice. The top four teams in group A would be joined with the bottom four teams in group B to compete in stage two and vice versa. Teams that did not play against each other in stage one would play each other twice, making for 8 rounds of competition. In stage three, the top four teams of one group would be joined with the bottom four teams of the opposing group; as is with stage two, teams that did not play against each other in stage one would play each other twice for a total of 8 rounds. The leader of the overall standing after three stages and 30 rounds would become crowned as champion.

However on 5 July, the CSL calendar was shortened to 22 matchdays from the original 30. The top four teams from Group A and B respectively after 14 matchdays would qualify for the championship group, which would consist of 8 matchdays as the teams from one group play only the teams from the other group twice. The winner of the championship group would be crowned as champions.

==== Results summary ====
Overall								Home						Away					
Pld	W	D	L	GF	GA	GD	Pts	W	D	L	GF	GA	GD	W	D	L	GF	GA	GD
22	9	6	7	26	28	−2	33	6	5	0	18	10	+8	3	1	7	8	18	−10

Last updated: 4 January 2022.

==== Overall ====
===== Results by round =====
Round	1	2	3	4	5	6	7	8	9	10	11	12	13	14	15	16	17	18	19	20	21	22
Ground (Note: All games in CSL are played on neutral grounds with limited or no attancence to mitigate potential impact of the COVID-19 pandemic. Recorded here are whether the game is designated home or away.)	A	A	H	A	H	H	A	H	A	H	A	A	H	H	H	A	A	H	A	H	H	A
Result	L	L	W	W	W	D	L	D	W	W	D	L	W	W	W	L	L	D	L	D	D	W
Position	11	15	10	8	3	7	9	9	8	7	8	9	8	6	5	5	6	6	6	6	6	5

Updated to match(es) played on 4 January 2022. Source: Competitive matches
A = Away; H = Home; W = Win; D = Draw; L = Loss

==== Qualification stage ====
===== League table =====
Pos	Team	Pld	W	D	L	GF	GA	GD	Pts	Qualification or relegation
1	Changchun Yatai	14	8	4	2	23	11	+12	28 (Note: Head-to-head results: Changchun Yatai 2–1 Shanghai Port, Shanghai Port 0–0 Changchun Yatai.)	Qualification for Championship stage
2	Shanghai Port	14	8	4	2	30	7	+23	28	Qualification for Championship stage
3	Beijing Guoan	14	7	3	4	19	16	+3	24	Qualification for Championship stage
4	Hebei	14	6	5	3	12	11	+1	23	Qualification for Championship stage
5	Shanghai Shenhua	14	6	4	4	21	17	+4	22	Qualification for Relegation stage

Source: CSL, Soccerway
Rules for classification:
- During season: 1) Points; 2) Goal difference; 3) Goals scored.
- After season: 1) Points; 2) Head-to-head points; 3) Head-to-head goal difference; 4) Head-to-head goals scored; 5) Scores of the weight ratio of the reserve league and youth leagues.
  Notes:

===== Results by round =====
Round	1	2	3	4	5	6	7	8	9	10	11	12	13	14
Ground	A	A	H	A	H	H	A	H	A	H	A	A	H	H
Result	L	L	W	W	W	D	L	D	W	W	D	L	W	W
Position	6	8	5	4	2	4	5	5	5	4	4	5	5	3

Updated to match(es) played on 15 August 2021. Source: Competitive matches
A = Away; H = Home; W = Win; D = Draw; L = Loss

===== Matches =====
23 April 2021 1	Shanghai Shenhua	2–1	Beijing Guoan	Kunshan
20:00 UTC+8	Moreno 59'; Wu Xi 65'; Qian Jiegei (yellow card) 76'; Wen Jiabao (yellow card) 90+3'	Report	Gao Tianyi (yellow card) 33'; Kim Min-jae (yellow card) 59'; Li Lei 90+1'	Stadium: Kunshan Sports Centre Stadium; Attendance: 9,711; Referee: Wang Jing

28 April 2021 2	Shanghai Port	3–1	Beijing Guoan	Jiangyin
18:00 UTC+8	Lopes 1', 4'; Mooy (yellow card) 46'; He Guan (yellow card) 64'; Lü Wenjun 81'	Report	Viera 22'; Wang Gang (yellow card) 28'; Li Lei (yellow card) 29'; Cao Yongjing (yellow card) 50'	Stadium: Jiangyin Stadium; Attendance: 4,851; Referee: Li Haixin

4 May 2021 3	Beijing Guoan	2–0	Dalian Pro	Jiangyin
20:00 UTC+8	Yu Dabao (yellow card) 28'; Zhang Xizhe 53', 55'; Gao Tianyi (yellow card) 65'; Chi Zhongguo (yellow card) 71'	Report	Tong Lei (yellow card) 59' (yellow-red card) 73'; Sun Guowen (yellow card) 90+3'	Stadium: Jiangyin Stadium; Attendance: 2,017; Referee: Liang Caiwei

10 May 2021 4	Wuhan	0–2	Beijing Guoan	Suzhou
20:00 UTC+8	Fang Hao (yellow card) 15'; Luo Yi (yellow card) 89'; Ming Tian (yellow card) 90+4'	Report	Bakambu 5' (pen.), 46'; Chi Zhongguo (yellow card) 17'; Gao Tianyi (yellow card) 82'	Stadium: Suzhou Sports Center; Attendance: 1,913; Referee: Tang Shunqi

16 July 2021 5	Beijing Guoan	2–1	Hebei	Jiangyin
19:30 UTC+8	Zhang Yuning 51' (pen.); Zhang Xizhe 83' (pen.); Gao Tianyi (yellow card) 85'; Hou Sen (yellow card) 86'; Yu Dabao (yellow card) 90+3'	Report	Pan Ximing (yellow card) 48'; Chi Wenyi (yellow card) 50'; Zhang Chengdong (yellow card) 68'; Selnæs (yellow card) 81', (goal) 89'	Stadium: Jiangyin Stadium; Attendance: 0 Referee: Tang Shunqi

19 July 2021 6	Beijing Guoan	0–0	Tianjin Jinmen Tiger	Suzhou
16:30 UTC+8	Souza (yellow card) 46'	Report	Teng Shangkun (yellow card) 89'; Cruz (yellow card) 90+5'	Stadium: Suzhou Olympic Sports Centre Outer Field; Attendance: 0 Referee: Dai Yige

22 July 2021 7	Changchun Yatai	2–0	Beijing Guoan	Suzhou
16:30 UTC+8	Tan Long 21'; Li Guangwen (yellow card) 49'; Sun Jie 74'	Report	Yu Yang (yellow card) 41'; Yang Fan (yellow card) 90+2'	Stadium: Suzhou Olympic Sports Centre Outer Field; Attendance: 0 Referee: Tang Shunqi

28 July 2021 9	Beijing Guoan	1–1	Shanghai Port	Jiangyin
16:30 UTC+8	Yu Yang (yellow card) 50'; Chi Zhongguo (yellow card) 84'; Yu Dabao 88'	Report	Wang Shenchao 60'	Stadium: Jiangyin Stadium; Attendance: 0 Referee: Zhang Long

31 July 2021 10	Dalian Pro	0–1	Beijing Guoan	Jiangyin
18:30 UTC+8	Wang Xianjun (yellow card) 47'; Boateng (yellow card) 74'	Report	Yu Yang (yellow card) 29'; Bakambu 75' (pen.) (yellow card) 77'; Gao Tianyi (yellow card) 90+5'	Stadium: Jiangyin Stadium; Attendance: 0 Referee: Jin Jingyuan

3 August 2021 11	Beijing Guoan	2–1	Wuhan	Suzhou
20:30 UTC+8	Bakambu 15', 20' (yellow card) 32'	Report	Li Chao (yellow card) 47'; Evrard 67'	Stadium: Suzhou Olympic Sports Centre; Attendance: 0 Referee: Zhang Long

6 August 2021 12	Hebei	0–0	Beijing Guoan	Kunshan
20:30 UTC+8	Memišević (yellow card) 41'; Yao Xuchen (yellow card) 77'	Report	Gao Tianyi (yellow card) 42'	Stadium: Kunshan Sports Centre Stadium; Attendance: 0 Referee: Li Haixin

9 August 2021 13	Tianjin Jinmen Tiger	3–1	Beijing Guoan	Jiangyin
18:30 UTC+8	Zhou Tong 34'; Shi Yan 81'; Tan Wangsong (yellow card) 84'; Bai Yuefeng (red card) 90'; Iloki 90+4' (pen.)	Report	Zhang Yuning 64'; Gao Tianyi (yellow card) 84'; Chi Zhongguo (red card) 86'; Yu Yang (yellow card) 87'; Li Lei (yellow card) 90+3'	Stadium: Jiangyin Stadium; Attendance: 0 Referee: Liu Wei

12 August 2021 14	Beijing Guoan	2–1	Changchun Yatai	Kunshan
20:30 UTC+8	Zhang Yuning 53', 90'; Gao Tianyi (yellow card) 57'; Li Lei (yellow card) 77'; Wang Ziming (yellow card) 83'; Zhang Xizhe (yellow card) 90+4'; Bai Yang (yellow card) 90+4'	Report	Rao Weihui (yellow card) 23'; Negrão 74'	Stadium: Kunshan Sports Centre Stadium; Attendance: 0 Referee: Tang Shunqi

15 August 2021 8	Beijing Guoan	4–2	Shanghai Shenhua	Jiangyin
19:30 UTC+8	Zhang Yuning 7', 81'; Zhang Xizhe 12' (pen.); Jonjić 16' (o.g.); Hou Sen (yellow card) 45+2'; Yu Dabao (yellow card) 57'; Bakambu (yellow card) 67'	Report	Wu Xi (yellow card) 29'; Cao Yunding 45+2'; Eddy Francis (yellow card) 62'; Zhu Chenjie (yellow card) 90+2'; Yu Hanchao 90+7'	Stadium: Jiangyin Stadium; Attendance: 0 Referee: Li Haixin

==== Championship stage ====
===== League table =====
Pos	Team	Pld	W	D	L	GF	GA	GD	Pts	Qualification
3	Guangzhou	22	13	5	4	47	17	+30	44	Qualification for AFC Champions League group stage
4	Changchun Yatai	22	11	6	5	31	20	+11	39	
5	Beijing Guoan	22	9	6	7	26	28	−2	33	
6	Shenzhen	22	9	5	8	33	29	+4	32	
7	Guangzhou City	22	7	8	7	32	31	+1	29	

Source: Soccerway
Rules for classification:
- During season: 1) Points; 2) Goal difference; 3) Goals scored.
- After season: 1) Points; 2) Head-to-head points; 3) Head-to-head goal difference; 4) Head-to-head goals scored; 5) Scores of the weight ratio of the reserve league and youth leagues.

===== Results by round =====
Round	1	2	3	4	5	6	7	8
Ground	H	A	A	H	A	H	H	A
Result	W	L	L	D	L	D	D	W
Position	5	5	6	6	6	6	6	5

Updated to match(es) played on 4 January 2022. Source: Competitive matches
A = Away; H = Home; W = Win; D = Draw; L = Loss

===== Matches =====
13 December 2021 15	Beijing Guoan	1–0	Guangzhou	Guangzhou
20:00 UTC+8	Gao Tianyi (yellow card) 50'; Li Lei (yellow card) 51'; Zhang Yuning 82'	Report		Stadium: Guangzhou Higher Education Mega Center Central Stadium; Attendance: 0 Referee: Zhang Lei

16 December 2021 16	Shandong Taishan	2–1	Beijing Guoan	Guangzhou
18:00 UTC+8	Dai Lin (yellow card) 66'; Son Jun-ho 80'; Liu Yang (yellow card) 83'; Jin Jingdao (yellow card) 89'; Jadson 90+2'; Delgado (yellow card) 90+4'	Report	Zhang Yuning 73'	Stadium: Guangzhou Higher Education Mega Center Central Stadium; Attendance: 0 Referee: Zhang Long

19 December 2021 17	Guangzhou City	5–0	Beijing Guoan	Guangzhou
20:00 UTC+8	Cardona 3', 64' (pen.); Zhang Gong 8'; Tiago 37', 82'; Yang Xiaotian (yellow card) 45+1'	Report	Jin Taiyan (yellow card) 16'; Gao Tianyi (yellow card) 35'; Jin Pengxiang (yellow card) 68'; Liu Huan (yellow card) 90+2'	Stadium: Yuexiushan Stadium; Attendance: 0 Referee: Xing Qi

22 December 2021 18	Beijing Guoan	2–2	Shenzhen	Guangzhou
18:00 UTC+8	Silva 10'; Jin Pengxiang (red card) 19'; Zhang Yuning 69'; Hou Sen (yellow card) 81'; Li Lei (yellow card) 90+2'	Report	Zhou Xin (red card) 13'; Zhang Yuan (yellow card) 20'; Mi Haolun (yellow card) 25'; Kardec 62'; Li Yuanyi 89'	Stadium: Yuexiushan Stadium; Attendance: 0 Referee: Jin Jingyuan

26 December 2021 19	Guangzhou	1–0	Beijing Guoan	Guangzhou
20:00 UTC+8	Deng Hanwen 40', (yellow card) 57'	Report	Chi Zhongguo (yellow card) 25'; Cao Yongjing (yellow card) 42'	Stadium: Tianhe Stadium; Attendance: 0 Referee: Gu Chunhan

29 December 2021 20	Beijing Guoan	1–1	Shandong Taishan	Guangzhou
18:00 UTC+8	Silva 17'; Xie Longfei (yellow card) 90+1'	Report	Dai Lin (yellow card) 21', (goal) 29'; Jadson (yellow card) 38'; Wang Tong (yellow card) 90+3'	Stadium: Guangzhou Higher Education Mega Center Central Stadium; Attendance: 0 Referee: Wang Di

1 January 2022 21	Beijing Guoan	1–1	Guangzhou City	Guangzhou
19:30 UTC+8	Zhang Yuning 41' (pen.)	Report	Han Pengfei (yellow card) 32'; Huang Zhengyu (yellow card) 38'; Li Tixiang 52'	Stadium: Huadu Stadium; Attendance: 0 Referee: Gu Chunhan

4 January 2022 22	Shenzhen	0–1	Beijing Guoan	Guangzhou
15:30 UTC+8	Zhang Yuan (yellow card) 32'; Zhou Xin (yellow card) 54'; Pei Shuai (yellow card) 61'; Li Yuanyi (yellow card) 79'	Report	Cao Yongjing 11'	Stadium: Guangzhou Higher Education Mega Center Central Stadium; Attendance: 0 Referee: Zhang Lei

=== Chinese FA Cup ===
Guoan joined the FA Cup in the fourth round beginning on 14 October along with 31 other teams. All rounds were single-elimination except for the quarter-finals and the semi-finals, in which two games were played between the competing teams.

14 October 2021 Fourth round	Beijing Guoan	1–1 (2–3 p)	Sichuan Jiuniu	Meizhou
19:30 UTC+8	Wang Ziming 28'	Report	Zhang Jiaqi 45+2'	Stadium: Wuhua County Olympic Sports Centre; Attendance: 0 Referee: Qiu Zhaojun
	Penalties
	Wang Ziming (penalty missed); Gao Tianyi (penalty scored); Jin Taiyan (penalty scored); Liu Huan (penalty missed); Yang Fan (penalty missed)		(penalty scored) Wang Qi; (penalty scored) Zheng Shengxiong; (penalty missed) Xiao Kun; (penalty scored) Wei Jingzong

=== AFC Champions League ===
==== Group stage ====
Pos	Team	Pld	W	D	L	GF	GA	GD	Pts	Qualification	KAW	DAE	UNI	BJG
1	(Japan) Kawasaki Frontale	6	6	0	0	27	3	+24	18	Advance to Round of 16	—	3–2	8–0	4–0
2	(South Korea) Daegu FC	6	4	0	2	22	6	+16	12	Advance to Round of 16	1–3	—	7–0	5–0
3	(Philippines) United City	6	1	1	4	4	24	−20	4		0–2	0–4	—	1–1
4	(China) Beijing Guoan	6	0	1	5	3	23	−20	1		0–7	0–3	2–3	—

Source: AFC
Rules for classification: Tiebreakers

26 June 2021 1	United City (Philippines)	1–1	(China) Beijing Guoan	Tashkent, Uzbekistan
19:00 UTC+5	Schröck 28'; Ott (yellow card) 41'	Report	Shi Yucheng (yellow card) 21'; Liang Shaowen 73'; Guo Quanbo (yellow card) 78'	Stadium: Bunyodkor Stadium; Attendance: 0 Referee: Mooud Bonyadifar (Iran)

29 June 2021 2	Beijing Guoan (China)	0–7	(Japan) Kawasaki Frontale	Tashkent, Uzbekistan
21:00 UTC+5	Xu Dongdong (yellow card) 25'	Report	Hasegawa 7'; Tachibanada 8'; Tono 41'; Chinen 47' (pen.), 59'; Yamamura 51'; Wakizaka 56'; Issaka (yellow card) 85'	Stadium: Lokomotiv Stadium; Attendance: 0 Referee: Masoud Tufayelieh (Syria)

2 July 2021 3	Daegu FC (South Korea)	5–0	(China) Beijing Guoan	Tashkent, Uzbekistan
19:00 UTC+5	Edgar 14', 27'; Cesinha 48', 55'; Nishi (yellow card) 61'; Lee Yong-Jin (yellow card) 86'; Kim Jin-hyuk (yellow card) 90+1'; Oh Hu-seong 90+2'	Report	Liang Shaowen (yellow card) 13'	Stadium: Bunyodkor Stadium; Attendance: 0 Referee: Mohammed Al-Hoish (Saudi Arabia)

5 July 2021 4	Beijing Guoan (China)	0–3	(South Korea) Daegu FC	Tashkent, Uzbekistan
19:00 UTC+5		Report	Kim Jin-hyuk 45'; Jung Chi-in 57'; Liang Shaowen 76' (o.g.)	Stadium: Bunyodkor Stadium; Attendance: 0 Referee: Nivon Robesh Gamini (Sri Lanka)

8 July 2021 5	Beijing Guoan (China)	2–3	(Philippines) United City	Tashkent, Uzbekistan
19:00 UTC+5	Jiang Wenhao 1'; Leng Jixuan 4'; Naibijiang (yellow card) 90'	Report	Kane (yellow card) 20'; Hartmann 59', 80'; Marañón 69'	Stadium: Lokomotiv Stadium; Attendance: 0 Referee: Ahmad Yacoub Ibrahim (Jordan)

11 July 2021 6	Kawasaki Frontale (Japan)	4–0	(China) Beijing Guoan	Tashkent, Uzbekistan
17:00 UTC+5	Chinen 21'; Kozuka 37'; Miyagi 56'; Leng Jixuan 69' (o.g.)	Report	Xu Dongdong (yellow card) 87'	Stadium: Lokomotiv Stadium; Attendance: 0 Referee: Mohammed Al-Hoish (Saudi Arabia)

== Statistics ==
=== Appearances and goals ===
As of 4 January 2022

No.	Pos.	Nat.	Name	Chinese Super League		Chinese FA Cup		AFC Champions League		Total	
No.	Pos.	Nat.	Name	Apps	Goals	Apps	Goals	Apps	Goals	Apps	Goals
1	GK	(China)	Hou Sen	22	0	1	0	0	0	23	0
3	DF	(China)	Yu Yang	11(1)	0	0	0	0	0	11(1)	0
4	DF	(China)	Li Lei	17(2)	1	0	0	0	0	17(2)	1
6	MF	(China)	Chi Zhongguo	20	0	0	0	0	0	20	0
7	MF	(China)	Hou Yongyong	0	0	0	0	0	0	0	0
8	MF	(China)	Piao Cheng	4(11)	0	0	0	0	0	4(11)	0
9	FW	(China)	Zhang Yuning	20	10	0	0	0	0	20	10
10	MF	(China)	Zhang Xizhe	15(3)	4	0	0	0	0	15(3)	4
11	FW	(Brazil)	Anderson Silva	7(1)	2	0	0	0	0	7(1)	2
14	GK	(China)	Zou Dehai	0	0	0	0	0	0	0	0
15	MF	(China)	Gao Tianyi	20	0	1	0	0	0	21	0
16	DF	(China)	Jin Pengxiang	6	0	1	0	0	0	7	0
18	DF	(China)	Jin Taiyan	8(4)	0	0(1)	0	0	0	8(5)	0
19	DF	(China)	Liu Huan	11(3)	0	1	0	0	0	12(3)	0
20	FW	(China)	Wang Ziming	6(12)	0	1	1	0	0	7(12)	1
22	DF	(China)	Yu Dabao	13(2)	1	0	0	0	0	13(2)	1
23	MF	(China)	Li Ke	1(2)	0	0	0	0	0	1(2)	0
24	DF	(China)	Yang Fan	11(3)	0	1	0	0	0	12(3)	0
25	GK	(China)	Guo Quanbo	0	0	0	0	6	0	6	0
26	MF	(China)	Bai Yang	5(4)	0	0	0	0	0	5(4)	0
27	DF	(China)	Wang Gang	9(3)	0	0	0	0	0	9(3)	0
28	FW	(China)	He Zhenyu	2(8)	0	0	0	0	0	2(8)	0
29	DF	(China)	Jiang Tao	4(4)	0	1	0	0	0	5(4)	0
31	FW	(China)	Li Boxi	0	0	0	0	1(2)	0	1(2)	0
32	MF	(China)	Liu Guobo	0(2)	0	0(1)	0	0	0	0(3)	0
33	GK	(China)	Ma Kunyue	0	0	0	0	0	0	0	0
35	MF	(China)	Jiang Wenhao	0	0	0	0	5	1	5	1
36	DF	(China)	Liang Shaowen	2(1)	0	1	0	6	1	9(1)	1
37	MF	(China)	Cao Yongjing	6(12)	1	1	0	0	0	7(12)	1
38	DF	(China)	Ruan Qilong	2(1)	0	0(1)	0	6	0	8(2)	0
39	MF	(China)	Xie Longfei	0(2)	0	0(1)	0	3(3)	0	3(6)	0
40	FW	(China)	Gao Jian	0	0	0	0	1(4)	0	1(4)	0
61	FW	(China)	Leng Jixuan	0	0	0	0	5(1)	1	5(1)	1
62	DF	(China)	Ling Zhongyang	0	0	0	0	1(3)	0	1(3)	0
63	MF	(China)	Naibijiang Mohemati	0	0	0(1)	0	4(2)	0	4(3)	0
64	DF	(China)	Xu Dongdong	0	0	0	0	5(1)	0	5(1)	0
65	DF	(China)	He Xiaoqiang	0	0	1	0	1(1)	0	2(1)	0
66	MF	(China)	Hu Jiaqi	0	0	0	0	5(1)	0	5(1)	0
68	MF	(China)	Zhou Wenfeng	0	0	0	0	1(2)	0	1(2)	0
69	FW	(China)	Duan Dezhi	0	0	0	0	4	0	4	0
71	FW	(China)	Ma Yujun	0	0	0	0	3(3)	0	3(3)	0
76	GK	(China)	Wu Xiaopeng	0	0	0	0	0	0	0	0
77	MF	(China)	Li Ju	0	0	0	0	1(2)	0	1(2)	0
78	MF	(China)	Chen Huaiyuan	0	0	0	0	0(1)	0	0(1)	0
88	MF	(China)	Shi Yucheng	0	0	0	0	5(1)	0	5(1)	0
99	MF	(China)	Chen Yanpu	0	0	1	0	3(3)	0	4(3)	0
Players have left the club
2	DF	(South Korea)	Kim Min-jae	2	0	0	0	0	0	2	0
5	MF	(Brazil)	Renato Augusto	0	0	0	0	0	0	0	0
17	FW	(Democratic Republic of the Congo)	Cédric Bakambu	10(3)	5	0	0	0	0	10(3)	5
21	MF	(Spain)	Jonathan Viera	3	1	0	0	0	0	3	1
30	MF	(Brazil)	Lucas Souza	5(2)	0	0	0	0	0	5(2)	0

=== Goals ===
As of 4 January 2022

Rank	Position	Name	Chinese Super League	Chinese FA Cup	AFC Champions League	Total
1	FW	(China) Zhang Yuning	10	0	0	10
2	FW	(Democratic Republic of the Congo) Cédric Bakambu	5	0	0	5
3	MF	(China) Zhang Xizhe	4	0	0	4
4	FW	(Brazil) Anderson Silva	2	0	0	2
5	MF	(China) Jiang Wenhao	0	0	1	1
5	FW	(China) Leng Jixuan	0	0	1	1
5	DF	(China) Li Lei	1	0	0	1
5	DF	(China) Liang Shaowen	0	0	1	1
5	MF	(Spain) Jonathan Viera	1	0	0	1
5	DF	(China) Yu Dabao	1	0	0	1
5	FW	(China) Wang Ziming	0	1	0	1
5	MF	(China) Cao Yongjing	1	0	0	1
Total			25	1	3	29

=== Assists ===
As of 4 January 2022

Rank	Position	Name	Chinese Super League	Chinese FA Cup	AFC Champions League	Total
1	MF	(China) Gao Tianyi	4	0	0	4
2	DF	(China) Li Lei	2	0	0	2
2	FW	(China) Zhang Yuning	2	0	0	2
2	MF	(China) Cao Yongjing	1	1	0	2
4	DF	(China) Bai Yang	1	0	0	1
4	MF	(China) Hu Jiaqi	0	0	1	1
4	DF	(China) Ma Yujun	0	0	1	1
4	MF	(China) Li Ke	1	0	0	1
4	DF	(China) Yu Dabao	1	0	0	1
Total			12	1	2	15

=== Clean sheets ===
As of 4 January 2022

Rank	Name	Chinese Super League	Chinese FA Cup	AFC Champions League	Total
1	(China) Hou Sen	7	0	0	7
Total		7	0	0	7

=== Disciplinary record ===
N	P	Nat.	Name	Chinese Super League			Chinese FA Cup			AFC Champions League			Total			Notes
N	P	Nat.	Name	Yellow card	Second yellow card	Red card	Yellow card	Second yellow card	Red card	Yellow card	Second yellow card	Red card	Yellow card	Second yellow card	Red card	Notes
15	MF	(China)	Gao Tianyi	10			1						11			
2	DF	(China)	Kim Min-jae	1									1			
27	DF	(China)	Wang Gang	1									1			
4	DF	(China)	Li Lei	5									5			
37	MF	(China)	Cao Yongjing	2			1						3			
22	DF	(China)	Yu Dabao	3									3			
6	MF	(China)	Chi Zhongguo	4		1							4		1	
88	MF	(China)	Shi Yucheng							1			1			
25	GK	(China)	Guo Quanbo							1			1			
64	DF	(China)	Xu Dongdong							2			2			
36	DF	(China)	Liang Shaowen							1			1			
63	DF	(China)	Naibijiang Mohemati							1			1			
1	GK	(China)	Hou Sen	3									3			
30	MF	(Brazil)	Lucas Souza	1									1			
3	DF	(China)	Yu Yang	4									4			
24	DF	(China)	Yang Fan	1									1			
17	FW	(Democratic Republic of the Congo)	Cédric Bakambu	3									3			
26	MF	(China)	Bai Yang	1									1			
20	FW	(China)	Wang Ziming	1									1			
10	MF	(China)	Zhang Xizhe	1									1			
16	DF	(China)	Jin Pengxiang	1		1							1		1	
18	DF	(China)	Jin Taiyan	1									1			
19	DF	(China)	Liu Huan	1									1			
39	MF	(China)	Xie Longfei	1									1			

Last updated: 4 January 2022
Only competitive matches
(yellow card) = Number of bookings; (second yellow card) = Number of sending offs after a second yellow card; (red card) = Number of sending offs by a direct red card.
