= 2018 Beijing Sinobo Guoan F.C. season =

Beijing Sinobo Guoan
2018 season
- Manager: Roger Schmidt
- Stadium: Workers Stadium
- Super League: 4th
- FA Cup: Winners
- Top goalscorer: League: Cédric Bakambu (19); All: Cédric Bakambu (23)
Home colours	Away colours

The 2018 Beijing Sinobo Guoan F.C. season was their 15th consecutive season in the Chinese Super League, established in the 2004, and 28th consecutive season in the top flight of Chinese football. They competed in the Chinese Super League and Chinese FA Cup.

== First team ==
As of 13 July 2018

Note: Flags indicate national team as defined under FIFA eligibility rules; some limited exceptions apply. Players may hold more than one non-FIFA nationality.

No.	Pos.	Nation	Player
1	GK	(China) CHN	Hou Sen
2	DF	(China) CHN	Zheng Yiming
3	DF	(China) CHN	Yu Yang
4	DF	(China) CHN	Li Lei
5	MF	(Brazil) BRA	Renato Augusto (vice-captain)
6	MF	(China) CHN	Chi Zhongguo
7	MF	(China) CHN	Wei Shihao
8	MF	(China) CHN	Piao Cheng
9	FW	(Spain) ESP	Jonathan Soriano
10	MF	(China) CHN	Zhang Xizhe
11	MF	(China) CHN	Hu Yanqiang
15	DF	(China) CHN	Liu Huan
17	FW	(Democratic Republic of the Congo) COD	Cédric Bakambu
18	MF	(China) CHN	Jin Taiyan
19	FW	(China) CHN	Yu Dabao (Captain)

No.	Pos.	Nation	Player
20	FW	(China) CHN	Wang Ziming
21	FW	(China) CHN	Ning Weichen
22	GK	(China) CHN	Yang Zhi
23	MF	(Spain) ESP	Jonathan Viera
24	DF	(China) CHN	Zhang Yu
25	GK	(China) CHN	Guo Quanbo
26	MF	(China) CHN	Lü Peng
28	DF	(China) CHN	Jiang Tao
29	MF	(China) CHN	Ba Dun
30	DF	(China) CHN	Lei Tenglong
31	DF	(China) CHN	Li Siqi
32	MF	(China) CHN	Liu Guobo
33	GK	(China) CHN	Chi Wenyi
36	MF	(China) CHN	Wang Xiaole
45	MF	(China) CHN	Xue Mengtao

== Transfers ==
=== Winter ===
In:

No.	Pos.	Nation	Player
6	MF	(China) CHN	Chi Zhongguo (from Yanbian Funde)
7	MF	(China) CHN	Wei Shihao (from (Portugal) Leixões)
11	MF	(China) CHN	Hu Yanqiang (from Liaoning F.C.)
15	DF	(China) CHN	Liu Huan (from Chongqing Dangdai Lifan)
17	FW	(Democratic Republic of the Congo) COD	Cédric Bakambu (from (Spain) Villarreal)
20	MF	(China) CHN	Wang Ziming (loan return from Qingdao Jonoon)
23	MF	(Spain) ESP	Jonathan Viera (from (Spain) Las Palmas)
32	MF	(China) CHN	Liu Guobo (from Shanghai SIPG)
33	GK	(China) CHN	Chi Wenyi (from Yanbian Funde)
-	DF	(China) CHN	Sheng Pengfei (loan return from Dalian Boyoung)
-	DF	(China) CHN	Li Bowen (loan return from Beijing BIT)
-	MF	(China) CHN	Wang Hongyu (loan return from Beijing BIT)
-	MF	(China) CHN	Zhong Jiyu (loan return from Beijing BIT)

Out:

No.	Pos.	Nation	Player
2	DF	(Uzbekistan) UZB	Egor Krimets (loan return to (Uzbekistan) Pakhtakor Tashkent)
5	MF	(Brazil) BRA	Ralf (to (Brazil) Corinthians)
6	MF	(China) CHN	Zhang Xiaobin (Released)
11	MF	(China) CHN	Song Boxuan (to Tianjin Quanjian)
16	MF	(China) CHN	Du Mingyang (loan to Wuhan Chufeng Heli)
20	DF	(China) CHN	Zhang Xinxin (Retired)
23	MF	(China) CHN	Tang Shi (loan return to Meizhou Kejia)
27	MF	(China) CHN	Wu Guichao (to Meizhou Meixian Techand)
31	DF	(China) CHN	Zhao Hejing (to Guizhou Hengfeng)
32	DF	(China) CHN	Wei Xin (to Shanghai Sunfun)
52	MF	(China) CHN	He Yuan (to Beijing Enterprises)
55	MF	(China) CHN	Xu Ziteng (to Binzhou Dongchen)
63	DF	(China) CHN	Huang Tao (to Beijing Enterprises)
-	DF	(China) CHN	Li Bowen (to (Portugal) C.D. Aves)
-	MF	(China) CHN	Wang Hongyu (to Shijiazhuang Ever Bright)
-	MF	(China) CHN	Zhong Jiyu (to Shijiazhuang Ever Bright)

=== Summer ===
In:

No.	Pos.	Nation	Player
2	DF	(China) CHN	Zheng Yiming (from (Norway) Stabæk)
61	MF	(China) CHN	Leng Jixuan (Free Agent)
62	DF	(China) CHN	Liu Jishen (from Shanghai SIPG)
63	DF	(China) CHN	Aysan Kadir (from Tianjin TEDA)
64	MF	(China) CHN	Nebijan Muhmet (Free Agent)

Out:

No.	Pos.	Nation	Player
14	DF	(China) CHN	Jin Pengxiang (loan to Dalian Yifang)
35	GK	(China) CHN	Zhang Yan (to Jiangsu Suning)
41	FW	(China) CHN	Zhang Chiming (to Tianjin TEDA)
46	MF	(China) CHN	Tang Hai (to Meizhou Hakka )
-	DF	(China) CHN	Sheng Pengfei (loan to Taizhou Yuanda)
-	DF	(China) CHN	Cai Peilei (to Guizhou Hengfeng)

== Staff ==
Position	Staff
Team leader	(China) Fu Bin
Head coach	(Germany) Roger Schmidt
Assistant coach	(Austria) Richard Kitzbichler
Assistant coach	(China) Tao Wei
Goalkeeping coach	(Germany) Michael Kraft
Fitness coach	(England) Oliver Bartlett
Analyst	(China) Cheng Jun
Trainer-Coordinator	(Germany) Jörn Wolf
Team physician	(Canada) Jin Ri
Team physician	(China) Wang Kai
Team physician	(Germany) Lukas Ditczyk
Team physician	(Germany) Steffen Lutz
Kit manager	(China) Kang Yuming
Kit manager	(China) Liu Peng

== Friendlies ==
=== Pre-season ===
15 January 2018 Friendly	MSV Duisburg (Germany)	2–2	Beijing Sinobo Guoan	Lagos, Portugal
14:00 UTC+0	Onuegbu 79', 90'	Report	Zhang Xizhe 25'; Liu Guobo 81'	Stadium: Cascade Hotel Football Field

22 January 2018 Friendly	Ulsan Hyundai (South Korea)	4–1	Beijing Sinobo Guoan	Lagos, Portugal
15:00 UTC+0		Report		Stadium: Cascade Hotel Football Field

29 January 2018 2018 Atlantic Cup	IFK Norrköping (Sweden)	1–1 (4–2 p)	Beijing Sinobo Guoan	Algarve, Portugal
20:00 UTC+0	Larsson 26'	Report	Bakambu 25'	Stadium: Estádio Algarve; Referee: Fábio Piló (Portugal)
	Penalties
	Holmberg (penalty scored); Gerson (penalty scored); Wahlqvist (penalty scored); Jakobsen (penalty scored)		(penalty missed) Liu Guobo; (penalty scored) Zhang Yu; (penalty scored) Wang Ziming; (penalty missed) Zhu Chaoqing

2 February 2018 2018 Atlantic Cup	AGF (Denmark)	2–0	Beijing Sinobo Guoan	Parchal, Portugal
20:00 UTC+0	Pušić 77'; Bundu 86'	Report		Stadium: Estádio Bela Vista; Referee: André Narciso (Portugal)

5 February 2018 2018 Atlantic Cup	Dalkurd FF (Sweden)	3–1	Beijing Sinobo Guoan	Parchal, Portugal
14:00 UTC+0	Berg 7'; DeJohn 26'; Bnou-Marzouk 32'		Soriano 11' (pen.)	Stadium: Estádio Bela Vista; Referee: André Narciso (Portugal)

21 February 2018 Friendly	Jeonnam Dragons (South Korea)	3–2	Beijing Sinobo Guoan	Shanghai, China

24 February 2018 Friendly	Shanghai Shenxin (China)	1–3	Beijing Sinobo Guoan	Shanghai, China

=== Mid–season ===
24 March 2018 Friendly	Beijing Enterprises (China)	1–2	Beijing Sinobo Guoan	Beijing, China
14:00 UTC+8				Stadium: Olympic Sports Centre

4 July 2018 Friendly	Beijing Sinobo Guoan	2–0	(China) Dalian Transcendence	Beijing, China
18:00 UTC+8				Stadium: Workers' Stadium

11 July 2018 Friendly	Beijing Sinobo Guoan	5–2	(China) Beijing Enterprises	Beijing, China
17:00 UTC+8				Stadium: Workers' Stadium

== Competitions ==
=== Chinese Super League ===
==== Table ====
Pos	Team	Pld	W	D	L	GF	GA	GD	Pts	Qualification or relegation
2	Guangzhou Evergrande Taobao	30	20	3	7	82	36	+46	63	Qualification to Champions League group stage
3	Shandong Luneng Taishan	30	17	7	6	57	39	+18	58	Qualification to Champions League play-off round
4	Beijing Sinobo Guoan (Note: Beijing Sinobo Guoan qualified for the 2019 AFC Champions League group stage as 2018 Chinese FA Cup winners.)	30	15	8	7	64	45	+19	53	Qualification to Champions League group stage
5	Jiangsu Suning	30	13	9	8	48	33	+15	48	
6	Hebei China Fortune	30	10	9	11	46	50	−4	39	

Source: League table
Rules for classification: 1) Points; 2) Head-to-head points; 3) Head-to-head goal difference; 4) Head-to-head goals scored; 5) Reserve league points; 6) U19 Elite league points; 7) Goal difference; 8) Goals scored; 9) Disciplinary points (1 point for each yellow card, 3 points for each red card); 10) Draw

==== Results by round ====
Round	1	2	3	4	5	6	7	8	9	10	11	12	13	14	15	16	17	18	19	20	21	22	23	24	25	26	27	28	29	30
Ground	A	A	A	H	H	A	H	H	A	H	A	H	H	A	H	H	H	H	A	A	H	A	A	H	A	H	A	A	H	A
Result	L	W	W	W	D	D	D	W	W	D	W	W	W	D	W	D	W	W	L	W	W	L	L	L	W	D	L	D	W	L
Position	14	10	5	3	3	5	5	4	3	3	3	1	1	1	1	1	1	1	1	1	1	3	3	4	4	4	4	4	4	4

Source: Competitive matches
A = Away; H = Home; W = Win; D = Draw; L = Loss

==== Matches ====
4 March 2018 1	Shandong Luneng Taishan	3–0	Beijing Sinobo Guoan	Jinan
19:35 UTC+8	Tardelli 29', 31'; Wu Xinghan 85'	Report		Stadium: Jinan Olympic Sports Center Stadium; Attendance: 32,517; Referee: Radek Příhoda (Czech Republic)

11 March 2018 2	Jiangsu Suning	1–2	Beijing Sinobo Guoan	Nanjing
19:35 UTC+8	Ji Xiang 68'	Report	Wei Shihao 23'; Bakambu 61'	Stadium: Nanjing Olympic Sports Center; Attendance: 32,133; Referee: Shi Zhenlu

16 March 2018 3	Dalian Yifang	0–3	Beijing Sinobo Guoan	Dalian
19:35 UTC+8		Report	Soriano 14' (pen.), 61'; Wei Shihao 24'	Stadium: Dalian Sports Center; Attendance: 41,399; Referee: Radek Příhoda (Czech Republic)

31 March 2018 4	Beijing Sinobo Guoan	4–0	Beijing Renhe	Beijing
19:35 UTC+8	Soriano 42'; Yu Yang 46'; Viera 50'; Yu Dabao 83' (pen.)	Report		Stadium: Workers' Stadium; Attendance: 53,887; Referee: Chris Beath (Australia)

6 April 2018 5	Beijing Sinobo Guoan	1–1	Tianjin Teda	Beijing
19:35 UTC+8	Soriano 11'	Report	Acheampong 27'	Stadium: Workers' Stadium; Attendance: 42,113; Referee: Ko Hyung-jin (South Korea)

15 April 2018 6	Chongqing Dangdai Lifan	3–3	Beijing Sinobo Guoan	Chongqing
19:35 UTC+8	Luiz Fernandinho 6'; Peng Xinli 8'; Kardec 18'	Report	Augusto 9'; Piao Cheng 29'; Bakambu 50'	Stadium: Chongqing Olympic Sports Center; Attendance: 33,186; Referee: Wang Jing

22 April 2018 7	Beijing Sinobo Guoan	2–2	Guangzhou Evergrande Taobao	Beijing
19:35 UTC+8	Augusto 90' (pen.); Bakambu 90+1'	Report	Gudelj 68'; Yu Hanchao 71'	Stadium: Workers' Stadium; Attendance: 56,211; Referee: Ma Ning

29 April 2018 8	Beijing Sinobo Guoan	4–3	Guizhou Hengfeng	Beijing
19:35 UTC+8	Viera 6', 18'; Ba Dun 26'; Bakambu 48'	Report	Steve 36', 75', 77'	Stadium: Workers' Stadium; Attendance: 35,156; Referee: Li Haixin

5 May 2018 9	Shanghai SIPG	1–2	Beijing Sinobo Guoan	Shanghai
19:35 UTC+8	Elkeson 27'	Report	Piao Cheng 46'; Bakambu 52'	Stadium: Shanghai Stadium; Referee: Pol van Boekel (Netherlands)

11 May 2018 10	Beijing Sinobo Guoan	2–2	Guangzhou R&F	Beijing
19:35 UTC+8	Bakambu 8', 83'	Report	Zahavi 12', 75'	Stadium: Workers' Stadium; Referee: Wang Di

19 May 2018 11	Changchun Yatai	0–2	Beijing Sinobo Guoan	Changchun
15:30 UTC+8		Report	Soriano 16' (pen.); Bakambu 70'	Stadium: Changchun Stadium; Referee: Li Haixin

18 July 2018 12	Beijing Sinobo Guoan	2–1	Henan Jianye	Beijing
19:35 UTC+8	Bakambu 32'; Viera 87'	Report	Feng Zhuoyi 62'	Stadium: Workers' Stadium; Referee: Wang Jing

22 July 2018 13	Beijing Sinobo Guoan	3–2	Tianjin Quanjian	Beijing
19:35 UTC+8	Augusto 39'; Yu Dabao 42'; Bakambu 56'	Report	Yang Xu 76'; Pato 81'	Stadium: Workers' Stadium; Referee: Kurt Ams (Australia)

28 July 2018 14	Shanghai Greenland Shenhua	2–2	Beijing Sinobo Guoan	Shanghai
20:00 UTC+8	Eddy Francis 54'; Wei Shihao 90+2' (o.g.)	Report	Augusto 45+2'; Bakambu 65'	Stadium: Hongkou Football Stadium; Referee: Guo Baolong

2 August 2018 15	Beijing Sinobo Guoan	6–3	Hebei China Fortune	Beijing
19:35 UTC+8	Soriano 7', 41', 58'; Viera 27', 73'; Chi Zhongguo 90+2'	Report	Gao Huaze 12'; Dong Xuesheng 45+3'; El Kaabi 62'	Stadium: Workers' Stadium; Referee: Kim Hee-gon (South Korea)

5 August 2018 16	Beijing Sinobo Guoan	1–1	Shandong Luneng Taishan	Beijing
19:35 UTC+8	Augusto 40'		Tardelli 5'	Stadium: Workers' Stadium; Referee: Chae Sang-hyeop (South Korea)

10 August 2018 17	Beijing Sinobo Guoan	3–1	Jiangsu Suning	Beijing
19:35 UTC+8	Zhang Xizhe 21'; Lei Tenglong 51'; Viera 81'		Zhang Yu 77' (o.g.)	Stadium: Workers' Stadium; Referee: Kim Woo-sung (South Korea)

14 August 2018 18	Beijing Sinobo Guoan	5–2	Dalian Yifang	Beijing
19:35 UTC+8				Stadium: Workers' Stadium; Referee: Wang Jing

18 August 2018 19	Beijing Renhe	3–0	Beijing Sinobo Guoan	Beijing
19:35 UTC+8				Stadium: Beijing Fengtai Stadium; Referee: Shi Zhenlu

25 August 2018 20	Tianjin Teda	2–5	Beijing Sinobo Guoan	Tianjin
19:35 UTC+8				Stadium: Tianjin Olympic Center Stadium; Attendance: 28,386; Referee: Gu Chunhan

30 August 2018 21	Beijing Sinobo Guoan	2–1	Chongqing Dangdai Lifan	Beijing
19:35 UTC+8				Stadium: Workers' Stadium; Referee: Ravshan Irmatov (Uzbekistan)

14 September 2018 22	Guangzhou Evergrande Taobao	1–0	Beijing Sinobo Guoan	Guangzhou
19:35 UTC+8				Stadium: Tianhe Stadium; Referee: Kim Dae-yong (South Korea)

22 September 2018 23	Guizhou Hengfeng	3–2	Beijing Sinobo Guoan	Guiyang
19:35 UTC+8				Stadium: Guiyang Olympic Sports Center; Referee: Milorad Mažić (Serbia)

29 September 2018 24	Beijing Sinobo Guoan	0–1	Shanghai SIPG	Beijing
19:35 UTC+8				Stadium: Workers' Stadium; Referee: Jarred Gillett (Australia)

7 October 2018 25	Guangzhou R&F	0–3	Beijing Sinobo Guoan	Guangzhou
19:35 UTC+8				Stadium: Yuexiushan Stadium; Referee: Ravshan Irmatov (Uzbekistan)

21 October 2018 26	Beijing Sinobo Guoan	1–1	Changchun Yatai	Beijing
15:30 UTC+8				Stadium: Workers' Stadium; Referee: Ma Ning

28 October 2018 27	Henan Jianye	2–0	Beijing Sinobo Guoan	Zhengzhou
19:35 UTC+8				Stadium: Zhengzhou Hanghai Stadium; Referee: Matthew Conger (New Zealand)

2 November 2018 28	Tianjin Quanjian	0–0	Beijing Sinobo Guoan	Tianjin
19:35 UTC+8				Stadium: Haihe Educational Football Stadium; Referee: Gu Chunhan

7 November 2018 29	Beijing Sinobo Guoan	3–1	Shanghai Greenland Shenhua	Beijing
19:35 UTC+8				Stadium: Workers' Stadium; Referee: Ma Ning

11 November 2018 30	Hebei China Fortune	2–1	Beijing Sinobo Guoan	Langfang
15:00 UTC+8				Stadium: Langfang Stadium; Referee: Shi Zhenlu

=== Chinese FA Cup ===
25 April 2018 Fourth round	Shanghai Shenxin	0–1	Beijing Sinobo Guoan	Shanghai
18:00 UTC+8		Report	Soriano 87'	Stadium: Jinshan Sports Centre; Referee: Liu Wei

2 May 2018 Fifth round	Beijing Sinobo Guoan	1–0	Tianjin Teda	Beijing
20:00 UTC+8	Soriano 69'			Stadium: Workers' Stadium; Referee: Wang Jing

9 June 2018 Quarter-Finals, First leg	Beijing Sinobo Guoan	2–1	Shanghai SIPG	Beijing
19:35 UTC+8	Viera 14'; Soriano 63' (pen.)		Hulk 34'	Stadium: Workers' Stadium; Attendance: 40,769; Referee: Ko Hyung-jin (South Korea)

25 July 2018 Quarter-Finals, Second leg	Shanghai SIPG	2–1 (a.e.t.) (3–3 agg.) (4–5 p)	Beijing Sinobo Guoan	Shanghai
19:35 UTC+8	Yu Hai 18'; Cai Huikang 39'		Viera 90+4'	Stadium: Shanghai Stadium; Referee: Kim Hee-gon (South Korea)
	Penalties
	Elkeson (penalty missed); Lü Wenjun (penalty scored); Oscar (penalty scored); Wang Shenchao (penalty scored); Wu Lei (penalty scored)		(penalty scored) Soriano; (penalty scored) Viera; (penalty scored) Zhang Xizhe; (penalty scored) Wei Shihao; (penalty scored) Augusto

22 August 2018 Semi-Finals, First leg	Beijing Sinobo Guoan	5–1	Guangzhou R&F	Beijing
19:35 UTC+8	Bakambu 14', 90+1'; Viera 48', 56'; Zhang Xizhe 82'		Lu Lin 25'	Stadium: Workers' Stadium; Attendance: 30,619; Referee: Ma Ning

26 September 2018 Semi-Finals, Second leg	Guangzhou R&F	0–3 (1–8 agg.)	Beijing Sinobo Guoan	Guangzhou
19:35 UTC+8			Bakambu 17'; Wei Shihao 85', 88'	Stadium: Yuexiushan Stadium; Referee: Chae Sang-hyeop (South Korea)

25 November 2018 Final, First leg	Beijing Sinobo Guoan	1–1	Shandong Luneng Taishan	Beijing
19:35 UTC+8				Stadium: Workers' Stadium

30 November 2018 Final, Second leg	Shandong Luneng Taishan	2–2 (3–3 agg.)	Beijing Sinobo Guoan	Jinan
19:35 UTC+8				Stadium: Jinan Olympic Sports Center Stadium
