= Li Ju =

Li Ju may refer to:

- Li Ju (Jin dynasty) (died 325), military general and warlord of the Jin dynasty
- Li Ju (table tennis) (born 1976), Chinese table tennis player
- Li Ju (footballer) (born 2002), Chinese footballer
- Ju Li (born 1975), Chinese-American nuclear engineer
- Li Ju, husband of calligrapher Wei Shuo
