= Jonathan Viera =

Spanish footballer (born 1989)

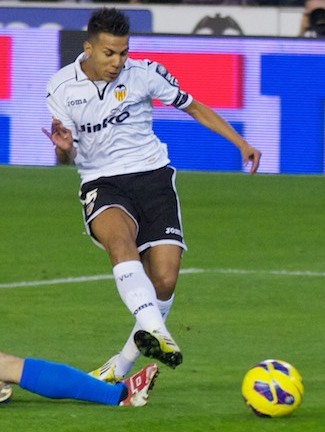
- Viera with Valencia in 2012

Personal information
- Full name: Jonathan Viera Ramos
- Date of birth: 21 October 1989 (age 37)
- Place of birth: Las Palmas, Spain
- Height: 1.71 m (5 ft 7 in)
- Positions: Winger; attacking midfielder

Youth career
- Atlético Feria
- 2005–2008: Las Palmas

Senior career*
Years	Team	Apps	(Gls)
2008–2010	Las Palmas B	42	(19)
2010–2012	Las Palmas	60	(15)
2012–2014	Valencia	18	(2)
2013–2014	→ Rayo Vallecano (loan)	26	(5)
2014–2015	Standard Liège	3	(0)
2015	→ Las Palmas (loan)	17	(6)
2015–2018	Las Palmas	90	(21)
2018–2021	Beijing Guoan	65	(23)
2019	→ Las Palmas (loan)	13	(10)
2021–2023	Las Palmas	73	(23)
2024	Almería	12	(0)
2024	Khor Fakkan	3	(2)
2025	Johor Darul Ta'zim	0	(0)
2025–2026	Las Palmas	28	(1)
2026	Ratchaburi	4	(0)
Total		454	(127)

International career
2011	Spain U21	1	(0)
2017	Spain	1	(0)
- * Club domestic league appearances and goals

Jonathan Viera Ramos (Spanish pronunciation: [ˈɟʝonatam ˈbjeɾa ˈramos]; (Note: In isolation, Jonathan is pronounced [ˈɟʝonatan].) born 21 October 1989) is a Spanish former professional footballer who played as a left winger or attacking midfielder.

== Club career ==
=== Las Palmas ===
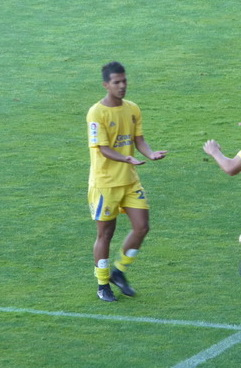
Viera playing for Las Palmas in 2011

Born in Las Palmas, Viera finished his youth career with hometown club Las Palmas, where he earned the nickname Romário. He made his senior debut with the reserve team, appearing in ten Segunda División B games in the 2008–09 season and suffering relegation. On 18 February 2010, he renewed his contract until June 2013.

Viera was definitely promoted to the main squad for 2010–11, as the team competed in the Segunda División. He finished the campaign with 31 matches (26 starts) and six goals, including three in a 5–3 away win against Barcelona B on 15 May 2011, which all but certified the Canary Islands side's permanence.

In January 2012, amidst rumours of a transfer – Las Palmas inclusively had everything arranged with Granada but the deal eventually fell through – Viera assured he would stay with his club until the end of the season. He finished as the second-best top scorer in the squad at nine, only trailing another youth graduate, Vitolo, by one goal.

=== Valencia ===
On 6 May 2012, one month before the Las Palmas season ended, Viera signed with La Liga's Valencia for five years and €2.5 million. He made his official debut against Barcelona, playing 13 minutes of a 1–0 away loss.

Viera scored his first goal in the top flight on 29 September 2012, closing the 2–0 home victory over Real Zaragoza. On 30 August of the following year, he was loaned to Madrid-based Rayo Vallecano in a season-long move without the option of making the deal permanent afterwards.

=== Standard Liège ===
On 1 September 2014, Viera cut ties with Valencia, immediately joining Standard Liège. He appeared in only seven competitive matches during his spell in Belgium, scoring in a 2–1 group stage defeat at Feyenoord in the UEFA Europa League.

=== Return to Las Palmas ===
On 14 January 2015, Viera was loaned to Las Palmas until June. He contributed seven goals in 21 appearances, as his team returned to the top division after a 13-year absence.

Viera signed a permanent three-year deal on 14 July 2015, for €900,000.

=== Beijing Guoan ===
On 19 February 2018, Viera joined Chinese Super League club Beijing Sinobo Guoan on a four-year contract for a fee of around €11 million. The player acknowledged the transfer "took care" of his future, and Las Palmas retained a buy-back option in the future. On 7 April 2019, he was named the competition's Player of the Month for the previous month.

Viera completed the second hat-trick of his career on 28 April 2019, scoring three goals in a 4–1 home defeat of Dalian Yifang in the domestic league. In August, he was loaned to Las Palmas until the end of the year.

=== Third spell at Las Palmas ===
On 23 August 2021, Viera returned to Las Palmas on a five-year contract. He scored a personal best 14 goals in his first season, adding seven in the following for the runners-up who thus returned to the top tier.

On 14 December 2023, the 34-year-old Viera left by mutual agreement. Shortly before that, he had briefly put his career on hold to take care of his sick wife.

=== Almería ===
On 6 February 2024, Viera joined top-flight Almería on a deal running until June 2025. On 15 July, however, after suffering relegation, he was allowed to terminate his link.

=== Later career ===
On 17 July 2024, Viera signed a one-year contract with UAE Pro League club Khor Fakkan. He scored on his debut, a 5–1 away loss against Al Ain; in September, however, he severed his ties.

Viera joined Johor Darul Ta'zim of the Malaysia Super League on 4 February 2025. On 12 July, the 35-year-old returned to Las Palmas for a fourth stint, signing a one-year contract.

== International career ==
Viera played once with the Spain under-21s, featuring the last minutes of the 1–1 friendly draw with Belarus in Alcalá de Henares. On 9 October 2017, as the full side had already qualified as group champions for the 2018 FIFA World Cup, manager Julen Lopetegui handed him his debut, and he played the entire 1–0 away win over Israel.

== Career statistics ==
Viera being interviewed after signing with Valencia (in Spanish)

As of match played 10 June 2026

Appearances and goals by club, season and competition
Club	Season	League			National cup (Note: Includes Copa del Rey, Belgian Cup, Chinese FA Cup)		League cup (Note: Includes UAE League Cup)		Continental		Other		Total	
Club	Season	Division	Apps	Goals	Apps	Goals	Apps	Goals	Apps	Goals	Apps	Goals	Apps	Goals
Las Palmas	2010–11	Segunda División	31	6	0	0	—		—		—		31	6
Las Palmas	2011–12	Segunda División	29	9	0	0	—		—		—		29	9
Las Palmas	Total		60	15	0	0	—		—		—		60	15
Valencia	2012–13	La Liga	17	2	5	0	—		3 (Note: Appearances in UEFA Champions League)	0	—		25	2
Valencia	2013–14	La Liga	1	0	0	0	—		0	0	—		1	0
Valencia	Total		18	2	5	0	—		3	0	—		26	2
Rayo Vallecano	2013–14	La Liga	26	5	2	0	—		—		—		28	5
Standard Liège	2014–15	Belgian Pro League	3	0	1	0	—		3 (Note: Appearances in UEFA Europa League)	1	—		7	1
Las Palmas	2014–15	Segunda División	17	6	0	0	—		—		4 (Note: Appearances in La Liga play-offs)	1	21	7
Las Palmas	2015–16	La Liga	36	10	2	0	—		—		—		38	10
Las Palmas	2016–17	La Liga	31	7	2	0	—		—		—		33	7
Las Palmas	2017–18	La Liga	23	4	2	0	—		—		—		25	4
Las Palmas	Total		107	27	6	0	—		—		4	1	117	28
Beijing Guoan	2018	Chinese Super League	27	11	7	5	—		—		—		34	16
Beijing Guoan	2019	Chinese Super League	17	8	1	0	—		5 (Note: Appearances in AFC Champions League)	0	1 (Note: Appearance in Chinese FA Super Cup)	0	24	8
Beijing Guoan	2020	Chinese Super League	18	3	1	0	—		8	2	—		27	5
Beijing Guoan	2021	Chinese Super League	3	1	0	0	—		0	0	—		3	1
Beijing Guoan	Total		65	23	9	5	—		13	2	1	0	88	30
Las Palmas (loan)	2019–20	Segunda División	13	10	0	0	—		—		—		13	10
Las Palmas	2021–22	Segunda División	32	14	0	0	—		—		2	0	34	14
Las Palmas	2022–23	Segunda División	32	7	0	0	—		—		—		32	7
Las Palmas	2023–24	La Liga	9	2	0	0	—		—		—		9	2
Las Palmas	Total		86	33	0	0	—		—		2	0	88	33
Almería	2023–24	La Liga	12	0	0	0	—		—		—		12	0
Khor Fakkan	2024–25	UAE Pro League	3	2	0	0	2	0	—		—		5	2
Las Palmas	2025–26	Segunda División	28	1	0	0	—		—		2	0	30	1
Career total			408	108	23	5	2	0	19	3	9	1	461	117

== Honours ==
Beijing Guoan

- Chinese FA Cup: 2018

Individual

- Segunda División Player of the Month: May 2015, December 2019, May 2022, October 2022
- Chinese FA Cup top scorer: 2018
