= Hu Yanqiang =

Chinese footballer

Hu Yanqiang 胡延强
Personal information
- Date of birth: 20 March 1993 (age 33)
- Place of birth: Benxi, Liaoning, China
- Height: 1.78 m (5 ft 10 in)
- Position: Midfielder

Youth career
- Liaoning Whowin

Senior career*
Years	Team	Apps	(Gls)
2012–2017	Liaoning Whowin	85	(3)
2018–2020	Beijing Guoan	8	(0)
2021	Xi'an Wolves	13	(2)
2022–2023	Dalian Zhixing	0	(0)
2025	Shenzhen Xingjun	0	(0)
2025	Dalian Hanyu	1	(0)
- * Club domestic league appearances and goals as of 31 December 2025

Hu Yanqiang (Chinese: 胡延强; born 20 March 1993 in Benxi) is a Chinese football player who currently plays for Benxi Qingfan.

== Club career ==
In 2012, Hu Yanqiang started his professional footballer career with Liaoning Whowin in the Chinese Super League. He made his league debut for Liaoning on 17 August 2012 in a game against Beijing Guoan, coming on as a substitute for Miloš Trifunović in the 81st minute.

On 14 December 2017, Hu transferred to Beijing Sinobo Guoan after Liaoning relegated to the second tier.

== Career statistics ==
Statistics accurate as of match played before 31 December 2025.

Club	Season	League			Cup		Continental		Other		Total	
Club	Season	Division	Apps	Goals	Apps	Goals	Apps	Goals	Apps	Goals	Apps	Goals
Liaoning Whowin	2012	Chinese Super League	2	0	1	0	–		–		3	0
Liaoning Whowin	2013	Chinese Super League	6	0	0	0	–		–		6	0
Liaoning Whowin	2014	Chinese Super League	15	0	0	0	–		–		15	0
Liaoning Whowin	2015	Chinese Super League	15	1	0	0	–		–		15	1
Liaoning Whowin	2016	Chinese Super League	26	0	1	0	–		–		27	0
Liaoning Whowin	2017	Chinese Super League	21	2	1	0	–		–		22	2
Liaoning Whowin	Total		85	3	3	0	0	0	0	0	88	3
Beijing Guoan	2018	Chinese Super League	8	0	1	0	–		–		9	0
Beijing Guoan	2019	Chinese Super League	0	0	0	0	0	0	0 (Note: Appearance in Chinese FA Super Cup)	0	0	0
Beijing Guoan	2020	Chinese Super League	0	0	0	0	0	0	–		0	0
Beijing Guoan	Total		8	0	1	0	0	0	0	0	9	0
Xi'an Wolves	2021	China League Two	13	2	1	0	–		–		14	2
Dalian Zhixing	2022	CMCL	?	?	–		–		–		?	?
Dalian Zhixing	2023	China League Two	0	0	0	0	–		–		0	0
Dalian Zhixing	Total		0	0	0	0	0	0	0	0	0	0
Shenzhen Xingjun	2025	Shenzhen Super League	0	0	4	0	–		–		4	0
Dalian Hanyu	2025	CMCL	1	0	–		–		1 (Note: Appearance in Promotion play-offs)	0	2	0
Career Total			107	3	9	0	0	0	1	0	117	3

== Honours ==
=== Club ===
Beijing Guoan

- Chinese FA Cup: 2018
