= Liang Shaowen =

Chinese association football player

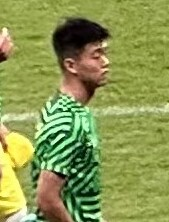
- Liang Shaowen in July 2023

Personal information
- Date of birth: 12 June 2002 (age 24)
- Place of birth: Weinan, Shaanxi, China
- Height: 1.87 m (6 ft 2 in)
- Position: Centre-back

Team information
- Current team: Shaanxi Union
- Number: 24

Youth career
- –2019: Beijing Guoan

Senior career*
Years	Team	Apps	(Gls)
2019–2024	Beijing Guoan	10	(0)
2020	→ China U19 (loan)	8	(1)
2021	→ China U20 (loan)	7	(1)
2024	→ Nantong Zhiyun (loan)	11	(0)
2025–	Shaanxi Union	27	(2)

International career^{‡}
2019	China U18	3	(0)
2023–2024	China U23	7	(0)
Medal record
Representing China
Men's football
EAFF Championship
Bronze medal – third place	2022 Japan	Team
- * Club domestic league appearances and goals as of 14:01, 31 December 2025 (UTC) ‡ National team caps and goals as of 14:01, 26 June 2021 (UTC)

Liang Shaowen (Chinese: 梁少文; born 12 June 2002) is a Chinese professional footballer who plays as a left-footed centre-back for China League One club Shaanxi Union.

== Club career ==
Born in Weinan, a city in the Chinese province of Shaanxi, Liang joined the youth sector of Beijing Guoan before being promoted to their senior team. To gain more time he would be loaned out to the China U19 team who were allowed to take part in the third tier of the Chinese pyramid. On his return in June 2021, despite not having registered a single league appearance with the Beijing's first team, yet, he was given an opportunity to shine on a continental level, as Beijing and the other Chinese teams involved in the AFC Champions League group stage sent a mix of reserves and youth players to the centralized venues: in fact, most of the senior players were still dealing with self-isolating measures to contrast COVID-19 following international matches, so the clubs involved chose to keep them in China, valuing performances in the national top-tier league over ACL fixtures.

So, on 26 June 2021, Liang ended up making his professional debut in unusual circumstances, captaining his side (led by youth coach Zoran Janković) against Filipino side United City at just 19 years old. Still, he managed to score his first senior goal for the club (a curled free-kick at the 73rd minute of the game) to help Beijing's inexperienced squad gain a surprising 1-1 final draw. After his return from the continental competition he would go on to make his league debut on 29 December 2021 against Shandong Taishan F.C. in a 1-1 draw.

On 8 January 2025, Liang announced that he is leaving Beijing Guoan on social media.

== International career ==
Liang has represented China PR at several youth ranks.

== Career statistics ==
=== Club ===
As of 31 December 2025.

Club	Season	League			Cup		Continental		Other		Total	
Club	Season	Division	Apps	Goals	Apps	Goals	Apps	Goals	Apps	Goals	Apps	Goals
Beijing Guoan	2019	Chinese Super League	0	0	0	0	0	0	–		0	0
Beijing Guoan	2021	Chinese Super League	3	0	1	0	6	1	–		10	1
Beijing Guoan	2022	Chinese Super League	7	0	1	0	–		–		8	0
Beijing Guoan	2023	Chinese Super League	0	0	0	0	–		–		0	0
Beijing Guoan	2024	Chinese Super League	0	0	0	0	–		–		0	0
Beijing Guoan	Total		10	0	2	0	6	1	0	0	18	1
China U19 (loan)	2020	China League Two	8	1	–		–		–		8	1
China U20 (loan)	2021	China League Two	7	1	0	0	–		–		7	1
Nantong Zhiyun (loan)	2024	Chinese Super League	11	0	2	0	0	0	–		13	0
Shaanxi Union	2025	China League One	27	2	3	1	0	0	–		30	3
Career total			63	4	7	1	6	1	0	0	76	6
