= Xie Longfei =

Chinese association football player

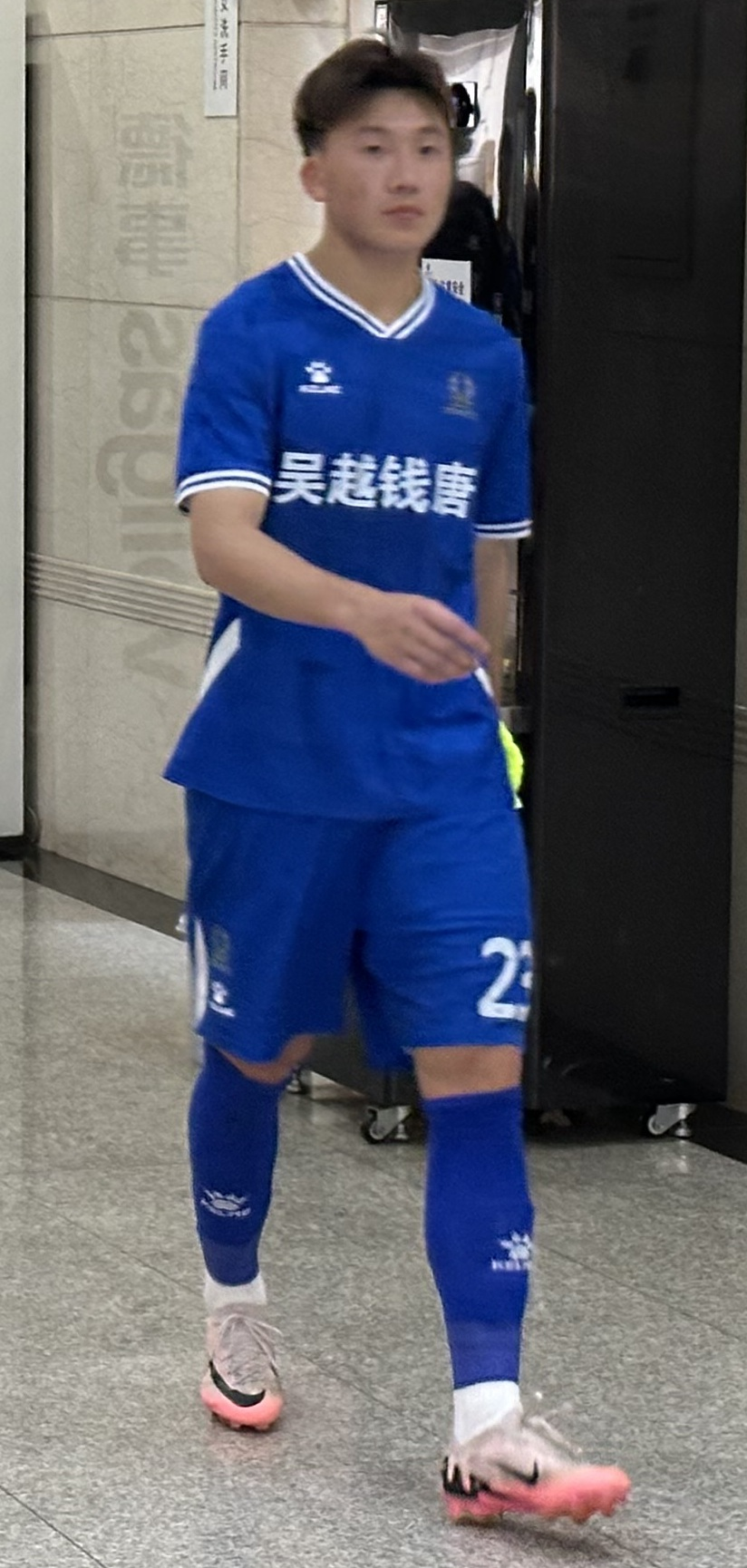
- Xie Longfei in June 2025

Personal information
- Date of birth: 15 July 2000 (age 26)
- Place of birth: Songzi, Hubei, China
- Height: 1.75 m (5 ft 9 in)
- Position: Forward

Team information
- Current team: Qingdao Youth Island (on loan from Beijing Guoan)
- Number: 43

Youth career
- 2013–2016: Villarreal
- 2017–2020: Beijing Guoan

Senior career*
Years	Team	Apps	(Gls)
2020–	Beijing Guoan	2	(0)
2022–	→ Qingdao Youth Island (loan)	6	(0)
- * Club domestic league appearances and goals as of 14:01, 30 October 2022 (UTC)

Xie Longfei (Chinese: 谢龙飞; born 15 July 2000) is a Chinese footballer currently playing as a forward for Qingdao Youth Island, on loan from Beijing Guoan.

== Club career ==
Xie was invited to join the academy of Villarreal in 2013, as part of the Wanda Group initiative to bring young Chinese players to Spanish clubs. After three years, he returned to China in 2017, signing with Beijing Guoan.

In August 2022, he was sent on loan to Qingdao Youth Island on loan.

== Career statistics ==
=== Club ===
As of 26 June 2021.

Club	Season	League			Cup		Continental		Other		Total	
Club	Season	Division	Apps	Goals	Apps	Goals	Apps	Goals	Apps	Goals	Apps	Goals
Beijing Guoan	2020	Chinese Super League	0	0	2 (Note: Appearances in the Chinese FA Cup)	1	0	0	0	0	2	1
Beijing Guoan	2021	Chinese Super League	2	0	1	0	6 (Note: Appearances in the AFC Champions League)	0	0	0	9	0
Beijing Guoan	2022	Chinese Super League	0	0	0	0	0	0	0	0	0	0
Beijing Guoan	Total		2	0	3	1	6	0	0	0	11	1
Qingdao Youth Island (loan)	2022	China League One	6	0	1	0	0	0	0	0	2	1
Career total			8	0	4	1	6	0	0	0	18	1
