= Jiang Tao (footballer, born 1989) =

Chinese footballer

Jiang Tao 姜涛
Personal information
- Full name: Jiang Tao
- Date of birth: 28 June 1989 (age 37)
- Place of birth: Zibo, Shandong, China
- Height: 1.81 m (5 ft 11 in)
- Position: Defender

Youth career
- 2001–2011: Beijing Guoan

Senior career*
| Years | Team | Apps | (Gls) |
| 2010 | → Beijing Guoan Talent (loan) | 12 | (2) |
| 2011–2014 | Beijing Guoan | 0 | (0) |
| 2013 | → Meizhou Hakka (loan) | 7 | (0) |
| 2015–2016 | Qingdao Huanghai | 44 | (1) |
| 2017–2020 | Beijing Guoan | 51 | (0) |
| 2021 | Beijing Guoan | 8 | (0) |

Managerial career
- 2022–: Beijing Guoan U14 (Assistant)
- * Club domestic league appearances and goals

Jiang Tao (Chinese: 姜涛; born 28 June 1989) is a Chinese football coach for Chinese Super League club Beijing Guoan's youth team and a former footballer who played as a defender mostly for Beijing Guoan.

== Club career ==
Jiang Tao would play for Beijing Guoan's youth team before he was loaned out to the clubs satellite team called Beijing Guoan Talent, which would play as a foreign team in Singapore's S.League in 2010. He made his senior debut in a 2–1 home defeat against Singapore Armed Forces FC on 23 June 2010. This would be followed by his first goal on 22 July 2010 in a 3-1 victory against Étoile FC in the league. Upon his return from his loan period he would be promoted to Beijing Guoan's senior team, however despite several appearances on the clubs substitutes bench he could not find any playing time on the field and during the 2013 league season he was loaned to third-tier club Meizhou Hakka to gain some playing time.

At the beginning of the 2014 league season Jiang Tao was released from his parent club. He would not find another team to play for until he joined second-tier club Qingdao Huanghai at the beginning of the 2015 league season. At Qingdao he would revive his career and establish himself as a vital member in the team's defence as the club narrowly missed out on winning the 2016 division championship on goal difference. His performances would attract the interests of top tier clubs especially Beijing Guoan who he rejoined at the beginning of the 2017 league season.

At the end of the 2019 season, Guoan offered Jiang a contract extension to the end of 2020. The club opted not to renew his contract after the 2020 season, but after a spell without a team, he returned to Beijing Guoan on a half-year contract on 13 July 2021. He capped 9 times in the season.

== Coaching career ==
His contract as a player was not renewed by Guoan at the conclusion of the 2021 season; instead, he was later offered a job to coach in Guoan's youth ranks. As of 2023, Jiang serves as the assistant coach to Guoan's U14 team.

== Career statistics ==
As of 31 December 2020.

Appearances and goals by club, season and competition
| Club | Season | League | | | National Cup | | League Cup | | Continental | | Other | | Total | |
| Club | Season | Division | Apps | Goals | Apps | Goals | Apps | Goals | Apps | Goals | Apps | Goals | Apps | Goals |
|---|---|---|---|---|---|---|---|---|---|---|---|---|---|---|
| Beijing Guoan Talent (loan) | 2010 | S. League | 12 | 2 | 0 | 0 | 1 | 0 | - | | - | | 13 | 2 |
| Beijing Guoan | 2011 | Chinese Super League | 0 | 0 | 0 | 0 | - | | - | | - | | 0 | 0 |
| Beijing Guoan | 2012 | Chinese Super League | 0 | 0 | 0 | 0 | - | | 0 | 0 | - | | 0 | 0 |
| Beijing Guoan | 2013 | Chinese Super League | 0 | 0 | 0 | 0 | - | | 0 | 0 | - | | 0 | 0 |
| Beijing Guoan | 2014 | Chinese Super League | 0 | 0 | 0 | 0 | - | | 0 | 0 | - | | 0 | 0 |
| Beijing Guoan | Total | | 0 | 0 | 0 | 0 | 0 | 0 | 0 | 0 | 0 | 0 | 0 | 0 |
| Meizhou Hakka (loan) | 2013 | China League Two | 7 | 0 | - | | - | | - | | - | | 7 | 0 |
| Qingdao Huanghai | 2015 | China League One | 17 | 0 | 1 | 0 | - | | - | | - | | 18 | 0 |
| Qingdao Huanghai | 2016 | China League One | 27 | 1 | 1 | 0 | - | | - | | - | | 28 | 1 |
| Qingdao Huanghai | Total | | 44 | 1 | 2 | 0 | 0 | 0 | 0 | 0 | 0 | 0 | 46 | 1 |
| Beijing Guoan | 2017 | Chinese Super League | 21 | 0 | 0 | 0 | - | | - | | - | | 21 | 0 |
| Beijing Guoan | 2018 | Chinese Super League | 23 | 0 | 7 | 0 | - | | - | | - | | 30 | 0 |
| Beijing Guoan | 2019 | Chinese Super League | 4 | 0 | 1 | 0 | - | | 2 | 0 | 1 (Note: Appearance in Chinese FA Super Cup) | 0 | 8 | 0 |
| Beijing Guoan | 2020 | Chinese Super League | 3 | 0 | 1 | 0 | - | | 3 | 0 | - | | 7 | 0 |
| Beijing Guoan | 2021 | Chinese Super League | 8 | 0 | 1 | 0 | - | | - | | - | | 9 | 0 |
| Beijing Guoan | Total | | 59 | 0 | 10 | 0 | 0 | 0 | 5 | 0 | 1 | 0 | 75 | 0 |
| Career total | | | 122 | 3 | 11 | 0 | 1 | 0 | 5 | 0 | 1 | 0 | 141 | 3 |

== Honours ==
=== Club ===
Beijing Guoan

- Chinese FA Cup: 2018
