= Ju Li =

American scientist (born 1975)

- Born: Li Ju; 25 April 1975 (age 51)
- Education: Massachusetts Institute of Technology University of Science and Technology of China, Special Class of Gifted Young
- Known for: AtomEye
- Awards: Presidential Early Career Award for Scientists and Engineers (2005)
- Scientific career
- Fields: Materials Physics, Computational materials science
- Workplaces: Massachusetts Institute of Technology
- Doctoral advisor: Sidney Yip
- Website: li.mit.edu

Ju Li (Chinese: 李巨; born 1975) is an American scientist, engineer, and currently the Battelle Energy Alliance Professor of Nuclear Science and Engineering and Materials Science and Engineering at Massachusetts Institute of Technology. A highly cited expert in his field, he is also a Fellow of the Materials Research Society and American Physical Society.

== Education ==
Ju Li earned his B.S. from University of Science and Technology of China in 1994 and his Ph.D. from Massachusetts Institute of Technology in 2000.

== Honors and awards ==
- Clarivate Highly Cited Researchers 2018 in Materials Science field
- Fellow of the Materials Research Society (2017)
- Fellow of the American Physical Society (2014)
- Thomson Reuters Highly Cited Researchers 2014, among 147 scientists worldwide in Materials Science category based on papers published between 2002 and 2012, and among "The World's Most Influential Scientific Minds 2014"
- Lee Hsun Young Scientist Lecture Series on Materials Science, Institute of Metal Research, Chinese Academy of Sciences (2011)
- Chinese Ministry of Education and Li Ka Shing Foundation Chang Jiang Scholar Award (2009)
- TMS Robert Lansing Hardy Award (2009)
- Technology Review TR35 award (2007)
- National Academy of Engineering U.S. Frontiers of Engineering Symposium (Microsoft Research, Sept. 2007) and German-American Frontiers of Engineering Symposium (Oak Ridge, April 2010) co-sponsored by the Alexander von Humboldt Foundation
- Materials Research Society (MRS) 2006 Outstanding Young Investigator Award
- Ohio State University College of Engineering Lumley Research Award 2006
- Presidential Early Career Award for Scientists and Engineers (PECASE) 2005
- Materials Research Society (MRS) Graduate Student Silver Medalist 1998
- MIT Nuclear Engineering Department Manson Benedict Fellowship 1996–1997

== Selected publications ==
- J Li, KJ Van Vliet, T Zhu, S Yip, S Suresh, Atomistic mechanisms governing elastic limit and incipient plasticity in crystals, Nature 418 (6895), 307-310 Atomistic mechanisms governing elastic limit and incipient plasticity in crystals
- J Feng, X Qian, CW Huang, J Li, Strain-engineered artificial atom as a broad-spectrum solar energy funnel, Nature Photonics 6 (12), 866-872 Strain-engineered artificial atom as a broad-spectrum solar energy funnel
- X Qian, J Liu, L Fu, J Li, Quantum spin Hall effect in two-dimensional transition metal dichalcogenides, Science 346 (6215), 1344–1347 Quantum spin Hall effect in two-dimensional transition metal dichalcogenides
- L Suo, W Xue, M Gobet, SG Greenbaum, C Wang, Y Chen, W Yang, Y Li, J Li, Fluorine-donating electrolytes enable highly reversible 5-V-class Li metal batteries, Proceedings of the National Academy of Sciences, 201712895
- Y Chen, Z Wang, X Li, X Yao, C Wang, Y Li, W Xue, D Yu, S Y Kim, F Yang, A Kushima, G Zhang, H Huang, N Wu, Y-W Mai, J. B. Goodenough, J Li, Li metal deposition and stripping in a solid-state battery via Coble creep, Nature 578 (2020) 251-255 Li metal deposition and stripping in a solid-state battery via Coble creep.
