= Chi Zhongguo =

Chinese footballer (born 1989)

Chi Zhongguo 池忠国
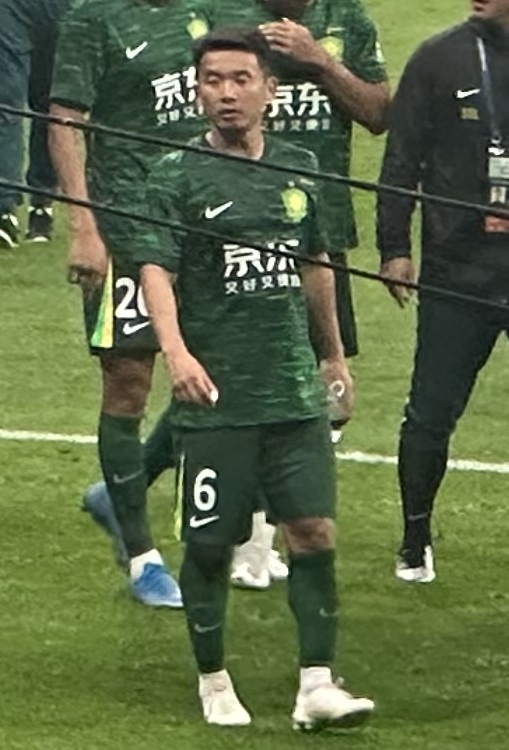
- Chi Zhongguo after a match in April 2025

Personal information
- Full name: Chi Zhongguo
- Date of birth: 26 October 1989 (age 37)
- Place of birth: Yanji, Jilin, China
- Height: 1.70 m (5 ft 7 in)
- Position: Midfielder

Team information
- Current team: Beijing Guoan
- Number: 6

Youth career
- Yanbian No.1 Middle School

Senior career*
Years	Team	Apps	(Gls)
2009–2014	Yanbian Changbaishan	135	(11)
2015	Shanghai Shenxin	29	(2)
2016–2017	Yanbian Funde	52	(2)
2018–	Beijing Guoan	180	(3)

International career^{‡}
2017–	China PR	21	(0)
- * Club domestic league appearances and goals as of 19 November 2026 ‡ National team caps and goals as of 12 October 2021

Chi Zhongguo
- Simplified Chinese: 池忠国
- Traditional Chinese: 池忠國
Transcriptions
Standard Mandarin
- Hanyu Pinyin: Chí Zhōngguó
- IPA: [ʈʂʰɻ̩̌ ʈʂʊ́ŋ kwǒ]

Chinese Korean name
- Chosŏn'gŭl: 지충국
- Hancha: 池忠國
Transcriptions
- Revised Romanization: Ji Chungguk
- McCune–Reischauer: Chi Ch'ungguk

Chi Zhongguo (Chinese: 池忠国; Korean: 지충국) is a Chinese professional footballer who plays as a midfielder for Chinese Super League club Beijing Guoan.

== Club career ==
Chi decided to turn professional after he graduated from Yanbian No.1 Middle School in 2008. After failing to join Beijing Institute of Technology, he signed a contract with hometown club Yanbian FC. On 29 March 2009, he made his senior debut in a 2–1 away defeat against Shanghai East Asia, coming on as a substitute for Han Songfeng in 73rd minute. On 25 October 2009, he scored his first goal for Yanbian, which ensured Yanbian beat Anhui Jiufang 2–0. Chi gradually became the regular starter in the club and was issued the number 10 jersey in 2013. On 27 July 2013, he made his 100th appearance for Yanbian in a league match against Tianjin Songjiang.

On 4 January 2015, Chi moved to Chinese Super League side Shanghai Shenxin on a free transfer. He made his Super League debut on 8 March 2015, in the first match of the season against Shanghai Greenland Shenhua, coming on as a substitute for Yang Jiawei. He scored his first Super League goal in 57th minute of this match, however, Shanghai Shenxin finally lost to Shanghai Greenland Shenhua 6–2.

On 2 February 2016, Chi returned to Yanbian Funde who newly promoted to the Chinese Super League after Shanghai Shenxin's relegation. He played two season for Yanbian, scoring two goals in 53 appearances and transferred to Super League side Beijing Guoan on 1 January 2018 after Yanbian Funde were relegated to the China League One. At Beijing he would go on to make his debut in a league game on 11 March 2018 against Jiangsu Suning in a 2-1 victory. Chi would establish himself as an integral member of the team and go on to win his first piece of silverware with the 2018 Chinese FA Cup against Shandong Luneng Taishan.

== International career ==
On 10 January 2017, Chi made his debut for the Chinese national team at the 2017 China Cup against Iceland.

== Career statistics ==
=== Club ===
Statistics accurate as of match played 4 November 2023.

Appearances and goals by club, season and competition
Club	Season	League			National Cup		Continental		Other		Total	
Club	Season	Division	Apps	Goals	Apps	Goals	Apps	Goals	Apps	Goals	Apps	Goals
Yanbian Changbaishan	2009	China League One	8	1	-		-		-		8	1
Yanbian Changbaishan	2010	China League One	17	0	-		-		-		17	0
Yanbian Changbaishan	2011	China League One	25	3	4	0	-		-		29	3
Yanbian Changbaishan	2012	China League One	27	0	1	0	-		-		28	0
Yanbian Changbaishan	2013	China League One	29	2	0	0	-		-		29	2
Yanbian Changbaishan	2014	China League One	29	5	1	0	-		-		30	5
Yanbian Changbaishan	Total		135	11	6	0	0	0	0	0	141	11
Shanghai Shenxin	2015	Chinese Super League	29	2	0	0	-		-		29	2
Yanbian Funde	2016	Chinese Super League	23	1	1	0	-		-		24	1
Yanbian Funde	2017	Chinese Super League	29	1	0	0	-		-		29	1
Yanbian Funde	Total		52	2	1	0	0	0	0	0	53	2
Beijing Guoan	2018	Chinese Super League	27	1	7	0	-		-		34	1
Beijing Guoan	2019	Chinese Super League	26	0	1	0	5	0	1 (Note: Appearances in Chinese FA Super Cup)	0	33	0
Beijing Guoan	2020	Chinese Super League	17	1	0	0	7	0	-		24	1
Beijing Guoan	2021	Chinese Super League	20	0	0	0	0	0	-		20	0
Beijing Guoan	2022	Chinese Super League	25	0	0	0	-		-		25	0
Beijing Guoan	2023	Chinese Super League	25	1	2	0	-		-		27	1
Beijing Guoan	Total		140	3	10	0	12	0	1	0	163	3
Career total			356	18	17	0	12	0	1	0	386	18

=== International ===
National team
Year	Apps	Goals
2017	2	0
2018	6	0
2019	9	0
2020	0	0
2021	4	0
Total	21	0

== Honours ==
Beijing Guoan

- Chinese FA Cup: 2018, 2025
- Chinese FA Super Cup: 2026
