= Gao Tianyi =

Chinese footballer (born 1998)

Gao Tianyi 高天意
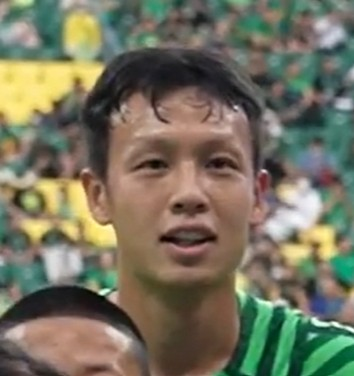
- Gao Tianyi with Beijing Guoan in 2023

Personal information
- Date of birth: 1 July 1998 (age 28)
- Place of birth: Dalian, Liaoning, China
- Height: 1.85 m (6 ft 1 in)
- Position: Midfielder

Team information
- Current team: Shanghai Shenhua
- Number: 17

Youth career
- Shandong Luneng
- Hangzhou Greentown
- Chengdu Blades
- 2013–2014: Damm
- 2014–2015: Hospitalet
- 2015–2016: Albacete

Senior career*
Years	Team	Apps	(Gls)
2016	Shenzhen FC	16	(0)
2017–2020	Jiangsu Suning	55	(1)
2019	→ Shenzhen FC (loan)	8	(1)
2021–2023	Beijing Guoan	69	(4)
2024–	Shanghai Shenhua	83	(6)

International career^{‡}
2019	China U22	2	(0)
2022–	China	11	(0)
2023	China U23 (wildcard)	5	(0)
Medal record
Representing China
Men's football
EAFF Championship
Bronze medal – third place	2025 South Korea	Team
- * Club domestic league appearances and goals as of 19 November 2026 ‡ National team caps and goals as of 25 November 2022

Gao Tianyi (Chinese: 高天意; born 1 July 1998) is a Chinese professional footballer who plays for Chinese football club Shanghai Shenhua and China national team.

== Club career ==
Gao Tianyi started his professional career with China League One side Shenzhen in 2016. On 13 February 2017, Gao transferred to Super League side Jiangsu Suning. On 1 March 2017, Gao made his debut for Jiangsu Suning in the 2017 AFC Champions League against Adelaide United, coming on as a substitute for Zhang Xiaobin in the 80th minute. He made his Super League debut on 5 March 2017 in a 4–0 away defeat against Shanghai Shenhua.

Able to take up a mandatory under-23 spot within the team, he would initially gain significant playing time at Jiangsu, but by the 2019 Chinese Super League season he would be unable to command the same amount of game time and was loaned out back to fellow top tier club Shenzhen. On his return to Jiangsu, Gao would fight to gain more playing time and was part of the squad that won the 2020 Chinese Super League title with them. On 28 February 2021, the parent company of the club Suning Holdings Group announced that operations were going to cease immediately due to financial difficulties.

On 16 February 2021, Beijing Guoan announced the signing of Gao. He was given the number 15 shirt. He would make his debut in a league game against Shanghai Shenhua on 24 April 2021 that ended in a 2–1 defeat.

== International career ==
On 24 March 2022, Gao made his international debut in a 1–1 draw against Saudi Arabia in the 2022 FIFA World Cup qualification.

On 12 December 2023, Gao was named in China's squad for the 2023 AFC Asian Cup in Qatar.

== Career statistics ==
Statistics accurate as of match played 4 November 2023.

Appearances and goals by club, season and competition
Club	Season	League			National Cup		Continental		Other		Total	
Club	Season	Division	Apps	Goals	Apps	Goals	Apps	Goals	Apps	Goals	Apps	Goals
Shenzhen	2016	China League One	16	0	1	0	-		-		17	0
Jiangsu Suning	2017	Chinese Super League	20	0	2	0	3	0	0 (Note: Appearances in Chinese FA Super Cup)	0	25	0
Jiangsu Suning	2018	Chinese Super League	22	0	3	0	-		-		25	0
Jiangsu Suning	2019	Chinese Super League	7	1	1	0	-		-		8	1
Jiangsu Suning	2020	Chinese Super League	6	0	5	0	-		-		11	0
Jiangsu Suning	Total		55	1	11	0	3	0	0	0	69	1
Shenzhen (loan)	2019	Chinese Super League	8	1	0	0	-		-		8	1
Beijing Guoan	2021	Chinese Super League	20	0	1	0	0	0	-		21	0
Beijing Guoan	2022	Chinese Super League	25	3	1	0	-		-		26	3
Beijing Guoan	2023	Chinese Super League	24	1	3	0	-		-		27	1
Beijing Guoan	Total		69	4	5	0	0	0	0	0	74	4
Career total			148	6	17	0	3	0	0	0	168	6

== Honours ==
Jiangsu Suning

- Chinese Super League: 2020

Shanghai Shenhua

- Chinese FA Super Cup: 2024, 2025
