= Liu Guobo =

Chinese footballer (born 1999)

Liu Guobo 刘国博
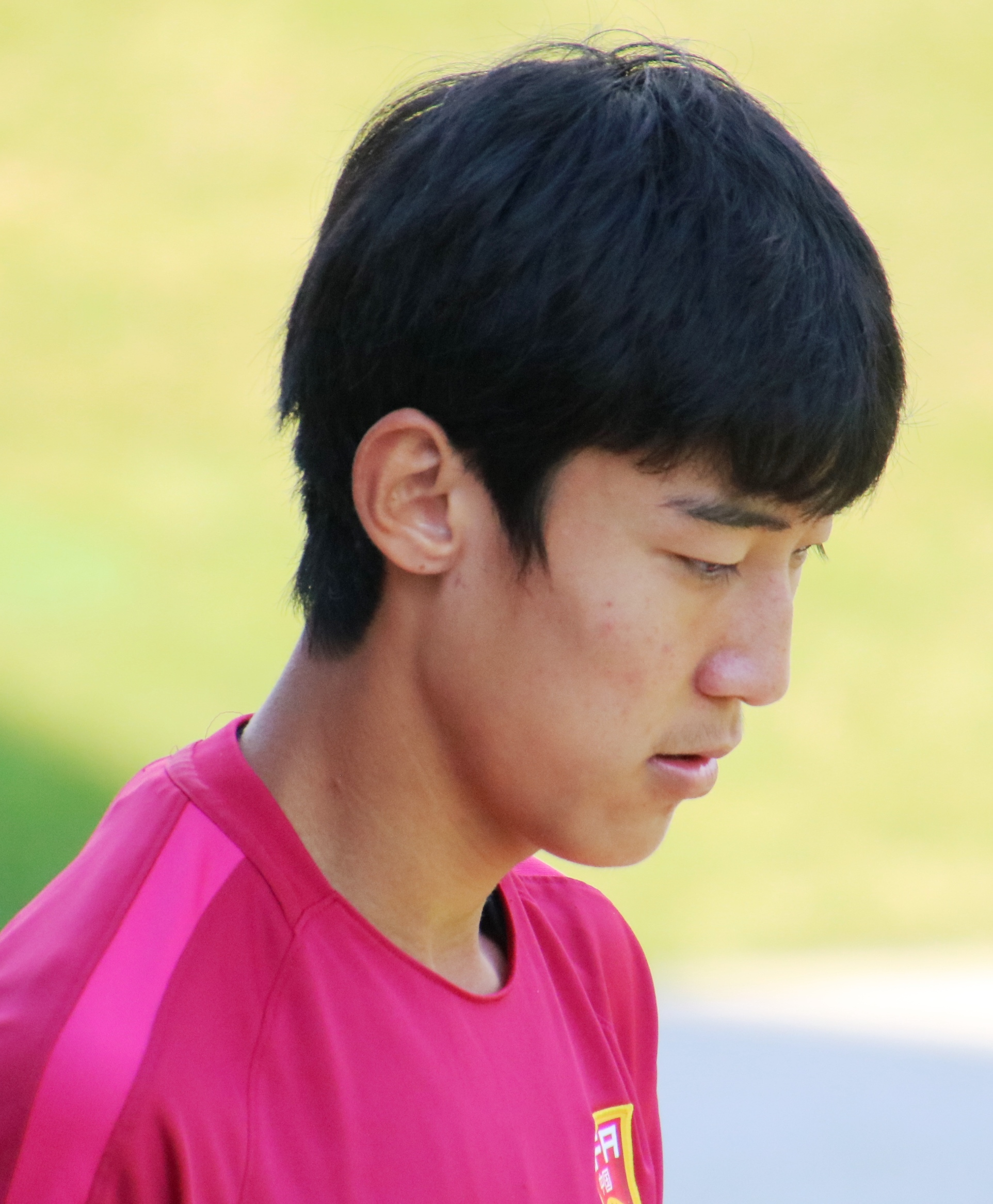

Personal information
- Date of birth: 27 November 1999 (age 26)
- Place of birth: Beijing, China
- Height: 1.89 m (6 ft 2 1/2 in)
- Positions: Midfielder; forward

Team information
- Current team: Liaoning Tieren (on loan from Shandong Taishan)
- Number: 22

Youth career
- Shanghai Lucky Star
- 2014–2018: Shanghai SIPG

Senior career*
Years	Team	Apps	(Gls)
2018–2023	Beijing Guoan	18	(0)
2023	→ Zibo Qisheng (loan)	3	(0)
2023–	Shandong Taishan	0	(0)
2024	→ Tai'an Tiankuang (loan)	3	(0)
2025	→ Jiangxi Lushan (loan)	10	(0)
2026	→ Ganzhou Ruishi (loan)	6	(0)
2026–	→ Liaoning Tieren (loan)	0	(0)

International career^{‡}
2018	China U19	10	(0)
- * Club domestic league appearances and goals as of 12 March 2026 ‡ National team caps and goals as of 23 October 2018

Liu Guobo (Chinese: 刘国博; born 27 November 1999) is a Chinese footballer who plays as a midfielder or forward for Chinese Super League club Liaoning Tieren on loan from Shandong Taishan.

== Club career ==
A native to Beijing, along with his younger brother Liu Guobao he would leave his hometown to pursue his football development, initially joining Shanghai Lucky Star before settling at the Shanghai SIPG's youth team. At Shanghai he would win the U18 men's football at the 2017 National Games of China by beating Sichuan in the final. On 3 January 2018 he took the chance to transfer to his hometown club Beijing Guoan. On 11 November 2018, Liu made his Chinese Super League debut for Beijing Guoan against Hebei China Fortune, coming on in the 89th minute for Chi Zhongguo. Liu left Guoan at the end of the 2022 Chinese Super League season.

== International career ==
In October 2018, Liu was included in the squad for the 2018 AFC U-19 Championship.

== Career statistics ==
As of 31 January 2023.

Appearances and goals by club, season and competition
Club	Season	League			League Cup		Continental		Other		Total	
Club	Season	Division	Apps	Goals	Apps	Goals	Apps	Goals	Apps	Goals	Apps	Goals
Beijing Guoan	2018	Chinese Super League	1	0	0	0	-		-		1	0
Beijing Guoan	2019	Chinese Super League	4	0	1	0	0	0	0	0	5	0
Beijing Guoan	2020	Chinese Super League	2	0	1	0	0	0	-		3	0
Beijing Guoan	2021	Chinese Super League	2	0	1	0	0	0	-		3	0
Beijing Guoan	2022	Chinese Super League	9	0	1	0	-		-		10	0
Beijing Guoan	Total		18	0	4	0	0	0	0	0	22	0
Career total			18	0	4	0	0	0	0	0	22	0

== Honours ==
=== Club ===
Beijing Guoan

- Chinese FA Cup: 2018
