= Shi Yucheng =

Chinese association football player

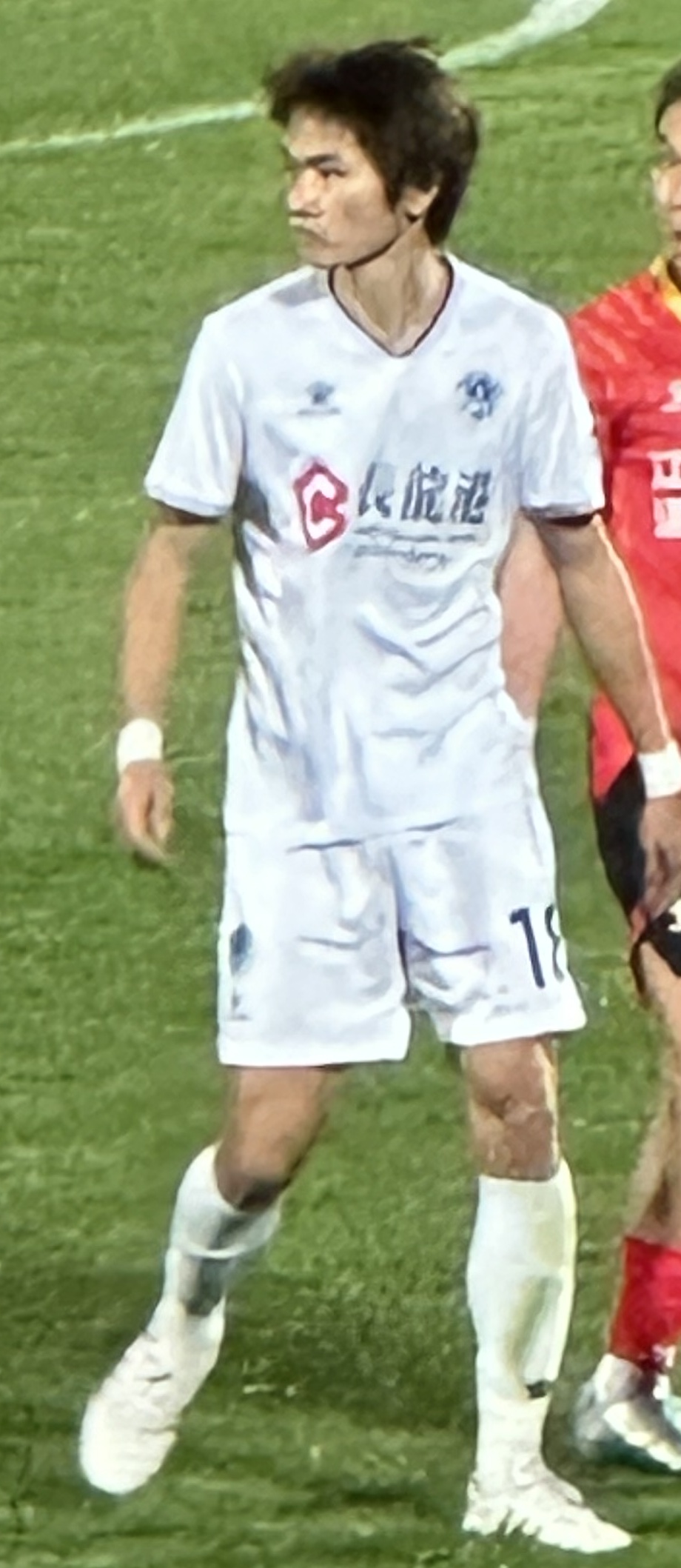
- Shi Yucheng in April 2025

Personal information
- Date of birth: 9 May 2001 (age 25)
- Place of birth: Shenzhen, Guangdong, China
- Height: 1.85 m (6 ft 1 in)
- Position: Midfielder

Team information
- Current team: Shenzhen Juniors
- Number: 18

Youth career
- –2018: Shenzhen FA
- 2019–2020: Beijing Guoan

Senior career*
Years	Team	Apps	(Gls)
2020–2025	Beijing Guoan	1	(0)
2023	→ Suzhou Dongwu	22	(1)
2024	→ Shenzhen Juniors	26	(1)
2025	→ Shenzhen Juniors	26	(0)
2026–	Shenzhen Juniors	0	(0)

International career^{‡}
2019	China U18	2	(0)
- * Club domestic league appearances and goals as of 14:01, 31 January 2023 (UTC) ‡ National team caps and goals as of 14:01, 26 June 2021 (UTC)

Shi Yucheng (Chinese: 史堉铖; born 9 May 2001) is a Chinese footballer currently playing as a midfielder for Shenzhen Juniors.

== Club career ==
Shi Yucheng was promoted to the senior team of Beijing Guoan within the 2020 Chinese Super League season. He would make his debut in a Chinese FA Cup game on 28 November 2020 against Chengdu Better City in a 1–0 victory. He would be given an opportunity to participate within senior games when he was part of the AFC Champions League squad, which was a mix of reserves and youth players to participate within centralized venues while the clubs senior players were still dealing with self-isolating measures due to COVID-19. He would make his continental debut in an AFC Champions League game on 26 June 2021 against United City F.C. in a 1–1 draw. He would go on to make his debut in a league game on 14 September 2022 against Hebei F.C. in a 3–1 victory.

== Career statistics ==
=== Club ===
As of 31 January 2023.

Club	Season	League			Cup		Continental		Other		Total	
Club	Season	Division	Apps	Goals	Apps	Goals	Apps	Goals	Apps	Goals	Apps	Goals
Beijing Guoan	2020	Chinese Super League	0	0	2	0	0	0	-		2	0
Beijing Guoan	2021	Chinese Super League	0	0	0	0	6 (Note: Appearances in the AFC Champions League)	0	-		6	0
Beijing Guoan	2022	Chinese Super League	1	0	1	0	-		-		2	0
Beijing Guoan	Total		1	0	3	0	6	0	0	0	10	0
Career total			1	0	3	0	6	0	0	0	10	0
