= Xu Dongdong (footballer) =

Chinese association football player

Personal information
- Date of birth: 7 November 2001 (age 25)
- Place of birth: Beijing, China
- Height: 1.73 m (5 ft 8 in)
- Position: Right-back

Team information
- Current team: Dalian K'un City
- Number: 18

Youth career
- –2020: Beijing Guoan

Senior career*
Years	Team	Apps	(Gls)
2020–2023	Beijing Guoan	1	(0)
2023	→ Beijing IT (Loan)	20	(0)
2024	Jiangxi Lushan	28	(2)
2025	Shaanxi Union	23	(0)
2026–	Dalian K'un City	0	(0)
- * Club domestic league appearances and goals as of 14:01, 01 July 2024 (UTC)

Xu Dongdong (Chinese: 徐东东; born 7 November 2001) is a Chinese footballer currently playing as a right-back for Dalian K'un City.

== Club career ==
Xu Dongdong was promoted to the senior team of Beijing Guoan within the 2020 Chinese Super League season. He would make his debut in a Chinese FA Cup game on 28 November 2020 against Chengdu Better City in a 1–0 victory. He would be given an opportunity to participate within senior games when he was part of the AFC Champions League squad, which was a mix of reserves and youth players to participate within centralized venues while the clubs senior players were still dealing with self-isolating measures due to COVID-19. He would make his continental debut in an AFC Champions League game on 26 June 2021 against United City F.C. in a 1–1 draw. He would go on to make his debut in a league game on 23 December 2022 against Guangzhou F.C. in a 3–1 victory.

== Career statistics ==
As of 1 July 2024.

Club	Season	League			Cup		Continental		Other		Total	
Club	Season	Division	Apps	Goals	Apps	Goals	Apps	Goals	Apps	Goals	Apps	Goals
Beijing Guoan	2020	Chinese Super League	0	0	2	0	0	0	-		2	0
Beijing Guoan	2021	Chinese Super League	0	0	0	0	6 (Note: Appearances in the AFC Champions League)	0	-		6	0
Beijing Guoan	2022	Chinese Super League	1	0	0	0	-		-		1	0
Beijing Guoan	Total		1	0	2	0	6	0	0	0	9	0
Beijing IT (Loan)	2023	China League Two	20	0	1	0	-		-		21	0
Jiangxi Lushan	2024	China League One	14	1	2	0	-		-		16	1
Career total			35	1	5	0	6	0	0	0	46	1
