= Zhang Yu (footballer, born 1994) =

Chinese footballer

Zhang Yu 张瑀
Personal information
- Date of birth: 7 May 1994 (age 32)
- Place of birth: Beijing, China
- Height: 1.88 m (6 ft 2 in)
- Position: Defender

Team information
- Current team: Qingdao Youth Island F.C.
- Number: 4

Youth career
- Beijing Guoan

Senior career*
Years	Team	Apps	(Gls)
2012	Beijing Youth	21	(0)
2013–2021	Beijing Guoan	25	(0)
2020	→ Changchun Yatai (Loan)	11	(0)
2021	Changchun Yatai	10	(0)
2022–	Qingdao West Coast	5	(2)
- * Club domestic league appearances and goals as of 4 October 2023

Zhang Yu (Chinese: 张瑀; pinyin: Zhāng Yǔ; born 7 May 1994) is a Chinese professional footballer who plays as a defender for Chinese Super League club Qingdao West Coast.

== Club career ==
Zhang Yu started his professional football career in 2012 when he registered for Beijing Youth, which was the U18 team of Chinese Super League side Beijing Guoan, for 2012 China League Two. He was promoted to Beijing Guoan's first team squad in 2013. Playing for the reserved team mostly between 2013 and 2017, he eventually made his debut for the club on 11 March 2018, playing the whole match in a 2–1 away win over Jiangsu Suning. Beijing Guoan manager Roger Schmidt gave high praise of his debut.

After a spell on trial ahead of the 2020 season, Zhang Yu joined Changchun Yatai on loan for the season, presenting him with a chance to earn regular first-team football thanks to the departure of Yu Rui to Chinese Super League club Shanghai SIPG.

== Career statistics ==
As of 31 December 2020.

Appearances and goals by club, season and competition
Club	Season	League			National Cup		Continental		Other		Total	
Club	Season	Division	Apps	Goals	Apps	Goals	Apps	Goals	Apps	Goals	Apps	Goals
Beijing Youth	2012	China League Two	21	0	-		-		-		21	0
Beijing Guoan	2013	Chinese Super League	0	0	0	0	0	0	-		0	0
Beijing Guoan	2017	Chinese Super League	0	0	0	0	-		-		0	0
Beijing Guoan	2018	Chinese Super League	23	0	7	0	-		-		30	0
Beijing Guoan	2019	Chinese Super League	2	0	1	0	1	0	0 (Note: Appearances in Chinese FA Super Cup)	0	4	0
Beijing Guoan	Total		25	0	8	0	1	0	0	0	34	0
Changchun Yatai (loan)	2020	China League One	11	0	2	0	-		-		13	0
Career total			56	0	10	0	1	0	0	0	67	0

== Honours ==
=== Club ===
Beijing Guoan

- Chinese FA Cup: 2018
