= Liu Huan (footballer) =

Chinese footballer (born 1989)

Liu Huan 刘欢
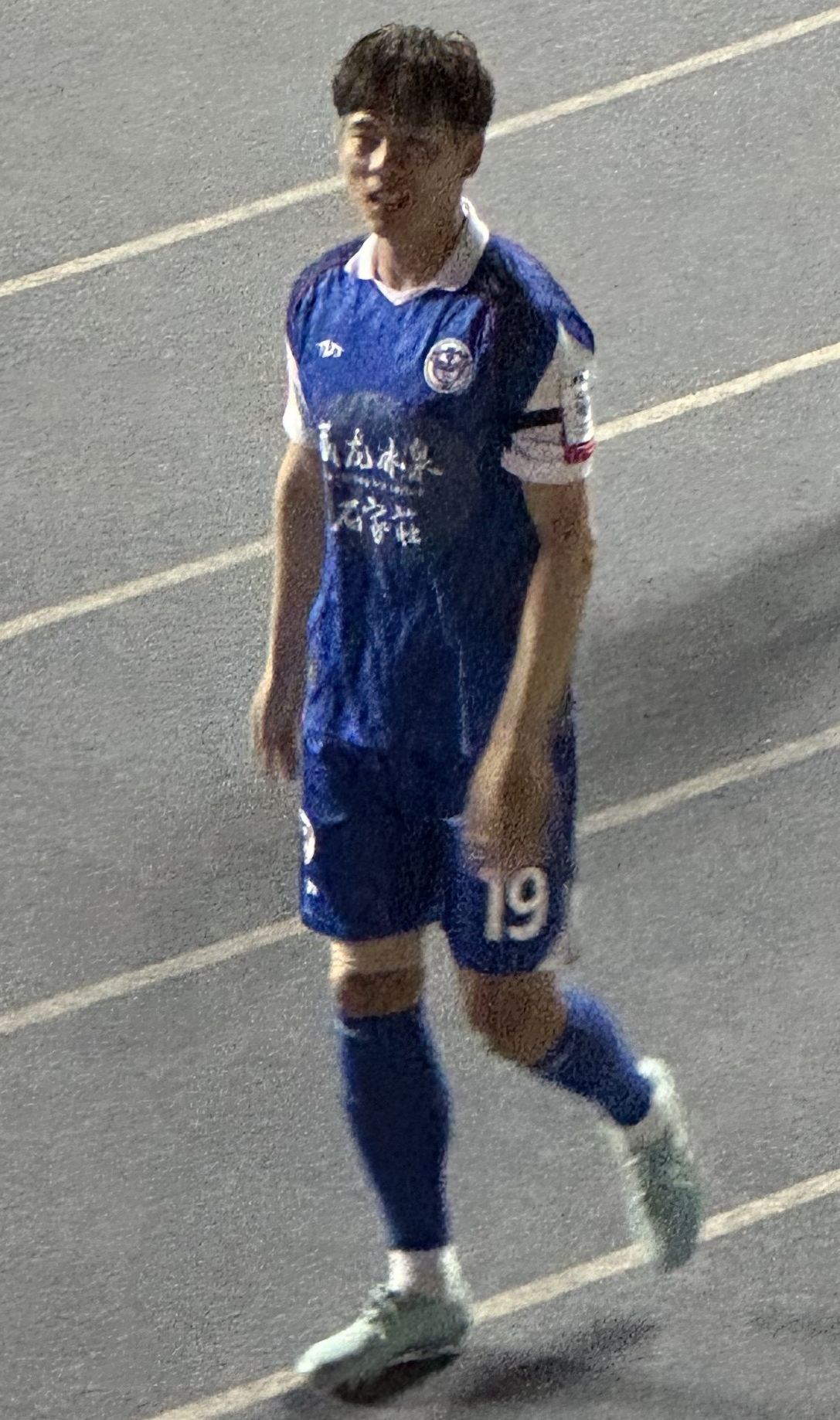
- Liu Huan in May 2025

Personal information
- Full name: Liu Huan
- Date of birth: 14 February 1989 (age 37)
- Place of birth: Beijing, China
- Height: 1.83 m (6 ft 0 in)
- Positions: Left-back; centre-back

Team information
- Current team: Foshan Nanshi

Senior career*
Years	Team	Apps	(Gls)
2009–2010	Anhui Jiufang	3	(0)
2011–2014	Shenyang Zhongze	89	(4)
2015–2016	Dalian Transcendence	45	(0)
2017	Chongqing Lifan	30	(2)
2018–2022	Beijing Guoan	52	(1)
2020	→ Chongqing Lifan (loan)	14	(0)
2023	Nantong Zhiyun	29	(0)
2024–2025	Shijiazhuang Gongfu	54	(2)
2026–	Foshan Nanshi	0	(0)
- * Club domestic league appearances and goals as of 24 September 2023

Liu Huan (simplified Chinese: 刘欢; traditional Chinese: 劉歡; pinyin: Liú Huān; born 14 February 1989) is a Chinese professional footballer who plays as a defender for China League One club Foshan Nanshi.

== Club career ==
Liu Huan started his professional football career in 2009 when he was promoted to China League One side Anhui Jiufang. He joined Tianjin Runyulong in January 2011 when Tianjin took over Anhui Jiufang and followed the club move to Shenyang as Shenyang Shenbei in July 2011. On 11 June 2011, he scored his first senior goal by heading the equalizer in the stoppage time in a 3–3 away draw against Yanbian Baekdu Tigers. Liu transferred to China League Two side Dalian Transcendence on 5 March 2015. He made 18 league appearances as Dalian Transcendence finished the runners-up in the 2015 season and promoted to the second tier.

On 4 January 2017, Liu joined Chinese Super League side Chongqing Dangdai Lifan on a free transfer. He established himself within the team immediately and made his debut for Chongqing on 5 March 2017 in a 0–0 home draw against Yanbian Funde. On 24 June 2017, he scored his first goal for the club in a 1–1 draw against Changchun Yatai. He scored his second goal on 13 August 2017 in a 3–2 away defeat against Shanghai SIPG. He appeared in every minute of the 2017 league season, playing in all 30 Super League games and scored two goals for Chongqing Lifan.

On 1 January 2018, Liu transferred to his hometown club Beijing Sinobo Guoan. He made his debut on 4 March 2018 in a 3–0 away defeat to Shandong Luneng Taishan. He would go on to establish himself as a regular within the team and go on to win his first piece of silverware with the 2018 Chinese FA Cup against Shandong Luneng Taishan. He would continue to be a squad player throughout his time at the club and was loaned out to his previous club Chongqing Lifan throughout the 2020 Chinese Super League season before leaving at the end of the 2022 Chinese Super League season when his contracted finished.

On 2 March 2026, Liu signed with China League One side Foshan Nanshi.

== Personal life ==
Liu Huan is the older twin brother of Dalian Pro defender Liu Le. They are from Beijing.

== Career statistics ==
As of 24 September 2023.

Appearances and goals by club, season and competition
Club	Season	League			National Cup		Continental		Other		Total	
Club	Season	Division	Apps	Goals	Apps	Goals	Apps	Goals	Apps	Goals	Apps	Goals
Anhui Jiufang	2009	China League One	0	0	-		-		-		0	0
Anhui Jiufang	2010	China League One	3	0	-		-		-		3	0
Anhui Jiufang	Total		3	0	0	0	0	0	0	0	3	0
Shenyang Zhongze	2011	China League One	21	1	2	0	-		-		23	1
Shenyang Zhongze	2012	China League One	14	2	2	0	-		-		16	2
Shenyang Zhongze	2013	China League One	26	0	0	0	-		-		26	0
Shenyang Zhongze	2014	China League One	28	1	1	0	-		-		29	1
Shenyang Zhongze	Total		89	4	5	0	0	0	0	0	94	4
Dalian Transcendence	2015	China League Two	18	0	3	0	-		-		21	0
Dalian Transcendence	2016	China League One	27	0	0	0	-		-		27	0
Dalian Transcendence	Total		45	0	3	0	0	0	0	0	48	0
Chongqing Lifan	2017	Chinese Super League	30	2	0	0	-		-		30	2
Beijing Guoan	2018	Chinese Super League	15	0	4	0	-		-		19	0
Beijing Guoan	2019	Chinese Super League	3	0	2	0	2	0	0 (Note: Appearances in Chinese FA Super Cup)	0	7	0
Beijing Guoan	2021	Chinese Super League	14	0	1	0	0	0	-		15	0
Beijing Guoan	2022	Chinese Super League	20	1	0	0	-		-		20	1
Beijing Guoan	Total		52	1	7	0	2	0	0	0	61	0
Chongqing Lifan (loan)	2020	Chinese Super League	14	0	0	0	-		-		14	0
Nantong Zhiyun	2023	Chinese Super League	24	0	1	0	-		-		25	0
Career total			257	7	16	0	2	0	0	0	275	7

== Honours ==
=== Club ===
Beijing Guoan

- Chinese FA Cup: 2018
