= Leng Jixuan =

Chinese association football player

Personal information
- Date of birth: 30 April 2001 (age 25)
- Place of birth: Liupanshui, Guizhou, China
- Height: 1.82 m (6 ft 0 in)
- Position: Forward

Team information
- Current team: Shaanxi Union
- Number: 30

Youth career
- –2018: Beijing Sangao
- 2018–2020: Beijing Guoan

Senior career*
Years	Team	Apps	(Gls)
2020–2022	Beijing Guoan	1	(0)
2020	→ China U19 (loan)	6	(0)
2022	→ Guangxi Pingguo Haliao (loan)	6	(0)
2023	Tianjin Jinmen Tiger	3	(0)
2024	Ganzhou Ruishi	27	(10)
2025-	Shaanxi Union	0	(0)
- * Club domestic league appearances and goals as of 14:01, 31 January 2023 (UTC) ‡ National team caps and goals as of 14:01, 26 June 2021 (UTC)

Leng Jixuan (Chinese: 冷季轩; born 30 April 2001) is a Chinese footballer currently playing as a forward for Shaanxi Union.

== Club career ==
Leng Jixuan would play for the Beijing Guoan youth team and to gain more playing time he would be loaned out to the China U19 team who were allowed to take part in the third tier of the Chinese pyramid. On his return he would be given an opportunity to participate within senior games when he was part of the AFC Champions League squad, which was a mix of reserves and youth players to participate within centralized venues while the clubs senior players were still dealing with self-isolating measures due to COVID-19. He would make his continental debut in an AFC Champions League game on 26 June 2021 against United City F.C. in a 1–1 draw.

He would go on to make his debut in a league game on 12 August 2022 against Wuhan Three Towns in a 5–1 defeat. After the game he would be loaned out to second-tier club Guangxi Pingguo Haliao, where he made his first appearance for them in a league game on 30 August 2022 against Shanghai Jiading Huilong in a 0–0 draw.

== Career statistics ==
As of 12 October 2023.

Club	Season	League			Cup		Continental		Other		Total	
Club	Season	Division	Apps	Goals	Apps	Goals	Apps	Goals	Apps	Goals	Apps	Goals
Beijing Guoan	2020	Chinese Super League	0	0	0	0	0	0	-		0	0
Beijing Guoan	2021	Chinese Super League	0	0	0	0	6 (Note: Appearances in the AFC Champions League)	1	-		6	1
Beijing Guoan	2022	Chinese Super League	1	0	0	0	-		-		1	0
Beijing Guoan	Total		1	0	0	0	6	1	0	0	7	1
China U19 (loan)	2020	China League Two	6	0	-		-		-		6	0
Guangxi Pingguo Haliao (loan)	2022	China League One	6	0	-		-		-		6	0
Tianjin Jinmen Tiger	2023	Chinese Super League	3	0	1	0	-		-		4	0
Career total			16	0	1	0	6	1	0	0	23	1
