= Li Ju (footballer) =

Chinese footballer (born 2002)

Li Ju 李炬
Personal information
- Date of birth: 10 January 2002 (age 24)
- Place of birth: China
- Position: Midfielder

Team information
- Current team: Beijing Guoan
- Number: 77

Youth career
- –2021: Beijing Guoan

Senior career*
Years	Team	Apps	(Gls)
2021–	Beijing Guoan	0	(0)
- * Club domestic league appearances and goals as of 14:01, 31 January 2023 (UTC)

Li Ju (Chinese: 李炬; born 10 January 2002) is a Chinese footballer currently playing as a midfielder for Beijing Guoan.

== Club career ==
Li Ju was promoted to the senior team of Beijing Guoan within the 2021 Chinese Super League season. He would be given an opportunity to participate within senior games when he was part of the AFC Champions League squad, which was a mix of reserves and youth players to participate within centralized venues while the clubs senior players were still dealing with self-isolating measures due to COVID-19. He would make his debut in an AFC Champions League game on 8 July 2021 against Daegu FC in a 3–0 defeat.

== Career statistics ==
As of 31 January 2023.

Club	Season	League			Cup		Continental		Other		Total	
Club	Season	Division	Apps	Goals	Apps	Goals	Apps	Goals	Apps	Goals	Apps	Goals
Beijing Guoan	2021	Chinese Super League	0	0	0	0	3 (Note: Appearances in the AFC Champions League)	0	-		3	0
Beijing Guoan	2022	Chinese Super League	0	0	0	0	-		-		0	0
Beijing Guoan	Total		0	0	0	0	3	0	0	0	3	0
Career total			0	0	0	0	3	0	0	0	3	0
