= 2019 Shanghai SIPG F.C. season =

Shanghai SIPG
2019 season
- Manager: Vítor Pereira
- Stadium: Shanghai Stadium
- Super League: 3rd
- FA Cup: Semi-final
- AFC Champions League: Quarter-final
- Top goalscorer: League: Hulk; Oscar (9 each); All: Hulk (16 goals)
- Average home league attendance: 21,271
Home colours	Away colours

The 2019 Shanghai SIPG F.C. season is Shanghai SIPG's 7th consecutive season in the Chinese Super League ever since it started back in the 2004 season and 7th consecutive season in the top flight of Chinese football. This season Shanghai SIPG participates in the Chinese Super League, Chinese FA Cup, Chinese FA Super Cup and AFC Champions League.

== Squad ==
=== First-team squad ===
As of 1 March 2019

Note: Flags indicate national team as defined under FIFA eligibility rules; some limited exceptions apply. Players may hold more than one non-FIFA nationality.

No.	Pos.	Nation	Player
1	GK	CHN	Yan Junling
2	DF	CHN	Zhang Wei
4	DF	CHN	Wang Shenchao
5	DF	CHN	Shi Ke
6	MF	CHN	Cai Huikang
8	MF	BRA	Oscar
9	FW	BRA	Elkeson
10	FW	BRA	Hulk (Captain)
11	FW	CHN	Lü Wenjun
12	FW	CHN	Li Haowen
13	DF	CHN	Wei Zhen
14	FW	CHN	Li Shenglong
15	FW	CHN	Lin Chuangyi
17	DF	CHN	Zhang Huachen
18	MF	CHN	Zhang Yi
19	FW	CHN	Hu Jinghang

No.	Pos.	Nation	Player
20	DF	CHN	Yang Shiyuan
21	MF	CHN	Yu Hai
22	GK	CHN	Sun Le
23	DF	CHN	Fu Huan
24	MF	CHN	Lei Wenjie
25	MF	UZB	Odil Ahmedov
28	DF	CHN	He Guan
29	DF	CHN	Nie Meng
31	DF	CHN	Xiao Mingjie
33	FW	CHN	Huang Zhenfei
34	GK	CHN	Chen Wei
35	GK	CHN	Shi Xiaodong
36	DF	CHN	Yu Hao
37	MF	CHN	Chen Binbin
40	DF	CHN	Li Shenyuan

== Squad statistics ==
=== Appearances and goals ===
As of 6 March 2019

No.	Pos	Nat	Player	Total		Super League		FA Cup		FA Super Cup		AFC Champions League	
No.	Pos	Nat	Player	Apps	Goals	Apps	Goals	Apps	Goals	Apps	Goals	Apps	Goals
1	GK	(China) CHN	Yan Junling	3	0	1	0	0	0	1	0	1	0
2	DF	(China) CHN	Zhang Wei	0	0	0	0	0	0	0	0	0	0
4	DF	(China) CHN	Wang Shenchao	3	1	1	0	0	0	1	1	1	0
5	DF	(China) CHN	Shi Ke	2	0	1	0	0	0	1	0	0	0
6	MF	(China) CHN	Cai Huikang	3	1	1	1	0	0	1	0	1	0
8	MF	(Brazil) BRA	Oscar	3	1	1	1	0	0	1	0	1	0
9	FW	(Brazil) BRA	Elkeson	3	0	1	0	0	0	1	0	1	0
10	FW	(Brazil) BRA	Hulk	2	1	0	0	0	0	1	0	1	1
11	FW	(China) CHN	Lü Wenjun	3	2	1	1	0	0	1	1	1	0
12	FW	(China) CHN	Li Haowen	0	0	0	0	0	0	0	0	0	0
13	DF	(China) CHN	Wei Zhen	3	0	1	0	0	0	1	0	1	0
14	FW	(China) CHN	Li Shenglong	2	0	1	0	0	0	0	0	1	0
15	FW	(China) CHN	Lin Chuangyi	2	0	1	0	0	0	0	0	1	0
17	DF	(China) CHN	Zhang Huachen	0	0	0	0	0	0	0	0	0	0
18	MF	(China) CHN	Zhang Yi	0	0	0	0	0	0	0	0	0	0
19	FW	(China) CHN	Hu Jinghang	0	0	0	0	0	0	0	0	0	0
20	DF	(China) CHN	Yang Shiyuan	0	0	0	0	0	0	0	0	0	0
21	MF	(China) CHN	Yu Hai	3	0	1	0	0	0	1	0	1	0
22	GK	(China) CHN	Sun Le	0	0	0	0	0	0	0	0	0	0
23	DF	(China) CHN	Fu Huan	3	0	1	0	0	0	1	0	1	0
24	MF	(China) CHN	Lei Wenjie	1	0	0	0	0	0	1	0	0	0
25	MF	(Uzbekistan) UZB	Odil Ahmedov	2	1	1	1	0	0	0	0	1	0
28	DF	(China) CHN	He Guan	3	0	1	0	0	0	1	0	1	0
29	DF	(China) CHN	Nie Meng	0	0	0	0	0	0	0	0	0	0
31	DF	(China) CHN	Xiao Mingjie	0	0	0	0	0	0	0	0	0	0
33	FW	(China) CHN	Huang Zhenfei	1	0	0	0	0	0	1	0	0	0
34	GK	(China) CHN	Chen Wei	0	0	0	0	0	0	0	0	0	0
35	GK	(China) CHN	Shi Xiaodong	0	0	0	0	0	0	0	0	0	0
36	DF	(China) CHN	Yu Hao	0	0	0	0	0	0	0	0	0	0
37	MF	(China) CHN	Chen Binbin	0	0	0	0	0	0	0	0	0	0
40	DF	(China) CHN	Li Shenyuan	0	0	0	0	0	0	0	0	0	0
Players transferred out during the season

=== Disciplinary record ===
As of match played unknown

No.	Pos	Nat	Player	Super League			FA Cup			FA Super Cup			AFC Champions League			Total		
No.	Pos	Nat	Player	Yellow card	Second yellow card	Red card	Yellow card	Second yellow card	Red card	Yellow card	Second yellow card	Red card	Yellow card	Second yellow card	Red card	Yellow card	Second yellow card	Red card
				0	0	0	0	0	0	0	0	0	0	0	0	0	0	0
Total				0	0	0	0	0	0	0	0	0	0	0	0	0	0	0

== Competitions ==
=== Chinese Super League ===
==== Table ====
Pos	Team	Pld	W	D	L	GF	GA	GD	Pts	Qualification or relegation
1	Guangzhou Evergrande Taobao (C)	30	23	3	4	68	24	+44	72	Qualification for AFC Champions League group stage
2	Beijing Sinobo Guoan	30	23	1	6	60	26	+34	70	Qualification for AFC Champions League group stage
3	Shanghai SIPG	30	20	6	4	62	26	+36	66	Qualification for AFC Champions League play-off round
4	Jiangsu Suning	30	15	8	7	60	41	+19	53	
5	Shandong Luneng Taishan	30	15	6	9	55	35	+20	51	

Source: CSL
Rules for classification:
- During season: 1) Points; 2) Goal difference; 3) Goals scored.
- After season: 1) Points; 2) Head-to-head points; 3) Head-to-head goal difference; 4) Head-to-head goals scored; 5) Scores of the weight ratio of the reserve league and youth leagues.
  (C) Champions

==== Results summary ====
Overall								Home						Away					
Pld	W	D	L	GF	GA	GD	Pts	W	D	L	GF	GA	GD	W	D	L	GF	GA	GD
30	20	6	4	62	26	+36	66	12	1	2	38	13	+25	8	5	2	24	13	+11

Last updated: 1 December 2019.
Source: League table

==== Results by round ====
Round	1	2	3	4	5	6	7	8	9	10	11	12	13	14	15	16	17	18	19	20	21	22	23	24	25	26	27	28	29	30
Ground	A	H	A	H	H	A	A	H	H	A	H	A	H	H	A	H	A	H	A	A	H	A	H	A	H	A	H	A	A	H
Result	W	W	W	L	W	D	W	W	W	W	W	W	L	W	W	W	W	W	D	D	D	D	W	L	W	W	W	L	D	W
Position	1	1	1	3	3	2	2	2	2	2	2	2	3	3	3	3	2	2	2	2	3	3	3	3	3	2	2	3	3	3

Updated to match(es) played on 1 December 2019. Source: Competitive matches
A = Away; H = Home; W = Win; D = Draw; L = Loss

==== Matches ====
All times are local (UTC+8).

1 March 2019 1	Shanghai Greenland Shenhua	0–4	Shanghai SIPG	Shanghai
19:35		Report (CSL); Report (Sina Sports)	Cai Huikang 45'; Lü Wenjun 64'; Oscar 77'; Ahmedov 87'	Stadium: Hongkou Football Stadium; Attendance: 23,832

9 March 2019 2	Shanghai SIPG	3–2	Jiangsu Suning	Shanghai
19:35	Wang Song 2' (o.g.); Zhang Wei 3'; Lü Wenjun 47'; Fu Huan (yellow card) 90+4'	Summary	Ji Xiang (yellow card) 63'; Xie Pengfei 65' 69'	Stadium: Shanghai Stadium; Referee: Huang Yejun

30 March 2019 3	Hebei China Fortune	1–2	Shanghai SIPG	Langfang
19:35	El Kaabi 73'; Mascherano (yellow card) 90+4'	Summary	Elkeson 9'; Fu Huan (yellow card) 45'; Ahmedov 80'	Stadium: Langfang Stadium; Attendance: 18,566; Referee: (Serbia) Milorad Mažić

5 April 2019 4	Shanghai SIPG	2–3	Chongqing Dangdai	Shanghai
19:35 UTC+8	Lü Wenjun 54'; Hulk 58' (yellow card) 90+5'; Li Shenglong (yellow card) 79'; Yu Hai (yellow card) 84'	Summary	Mierzejewski 30'; Fernandinho 39'; Chen Lei (yellow card) 45+2'; Jiang Zhe (yellow card) 57'; Alan Kardec (yellow card) 74'; Yan Junling 90+3' (o.g.)	Stadium: Shanghai Stadium; Attendance: 21,758; Referee: Ma Li

14 April 2019 5	Shanghai SIPG	2–1	Wuhan Zall	Shanghai
19:35	Hulk 72' (pen.); Cai Huikang (yellow card) 76'; Oscar (yellow card) 84'; Elkeson 90+4'	Summary	Li Hang 79'	Stadium: Shanghai Stadium; Referee: Wang Jin

19 April 2019 6	Tianjin Tianhai	0–0	Shanghai SIPG	Tianjin
19:35	Wang Yongpo (yellow card) 45+1'; Mi Haolun (yellow card) 59'	Summary	Yu Hai (yellow card) 17'; Wei Zhen (yellow card) 67'; Hulk (yellow card) 90+4'	Stadium: Tianjin Olympic Center Stadium; Referee: Zhang Lei (referee)

28 April 2019 7	Tianjin Teda	0–2	Shanghai SIPG	Tianjin
15:30	Zheng Kaimu (red card) 77'		Elkeson 17' 85'	Stadium: Tianjin Olympic Center Stadium

4 May 2019 8	Shanghai SIPG	2–0	Guangzhou R&F	Shanghai
19:30 UTC+8	Zhang Wei (yellow card) 30'; Li Shenglong 60'; Wei Zhen (yellow card) 69'; Hulk 74'	Summary	Tošić (yellow card) 44'; Ye Chugui (yellow card) 56'	Stadium: Shanghai Stadium; Attendance: 20,933; Referee: (Singapore) Muhd Jahari

12 May 2019 9	Shanghai SIPG	2–1	Shandong Luneng Taishan	Shanghai
19:35	Wei Zhen (yellow card) 70' (yellow-red card) 71'; Elkeson 74'; Zhang Wei (yellow card) 78'; Hulk 90+11' (pen.) (yellow card) 90+11'	Summary	Róger Guedes 1'; Chen Kerui (yellow card) 37'; Hao Junmin (yellow card) 90+2'; Gil (yellow card) 90+9'	Stadium: Shanghai Stadium; Attendance: 22,093; Referee: (Serbia) Milorad Mažić

17 May 2019 10	Henan Jianye	0–1	Shanghai SIPG	Zhengzhou
19:00 UTC+8	Wang Shangyuan (yellow card) 90+1'	Report	Fu Huan (yellow card) 22'; Elkeson 33'; Oscar (yellow card) 50'	Stadium: Zhengzhou Hanghai Stadium; Attendance: 20,236; Referee: (China) Gu Chunhan

26 May 2019 11	Shanghai SIPG	2–1	Beijing Sinobo Guoan	Shanghai
20:35	Oscar 28'; Cai Huikang (yellow card) 30' (goal) 78'; Yan Junling (yellow card) 90+4'; Elkeson (yellow card) 90+6'	Report	Wang Gang (yellow card) 55'; Yu Dabao 58'	Stadium: Shanghai Stadium; Attendance: 23,703; Referee: (New Zealand) Matthew Conger

2 June 2019 12	Dalian Yifang	1–2	Shanghai SIPG	Dalian
16:00 UTC+8	Qin Sheng (yellow card) 9'; Wang Yaopeng (yellow card) 36'; Mushekwi 61'; Zhu Xiaogang (yellow card) 70'; Zhu Ting (yellow card) 71'	Report	Elkeson 31'; Li Shenglong 43'; Yan Junling (yellow card) 87'	Stadium: Dalian Sports Center Stadium; Attendance: 26,919; Referee: (Uzbekistan) Ravshan Irmatov

14 June 2019 13	Shanghai SIPG	0–2	Guangzhou Evergrande Taobao	Shanghai
21:00	Yang Shiyuan (yellow card) 53'	Report	Paulinho 43' 90+5'; Xu Xin (yellow card) 81'	Stadium: Shanghai Stadium; Attendance: 25,227; Referee: (Serbia) Milorad Mažić

22 June 2019 14	Shanghai SIPG	3–0	Beijing Renhe	Shanghai
20:35	Cai Huikang (yellow card) 12'; Oscar 55'; Yang Shiyuan (yellow card) 63'; Li Shenglong 65'; Elkeson 69'	Report	Liu Jian (yellow card) 11'; Zhang Yufeng (yellow card) 52'; Wang Xuanhong (yellow card) 62'	Stadium: Shanghai Stadium; Attendance: 19,125; Referee: (China) Gu Chunhan

30 June 2019 15	Shenzhen F.C.	0–1	Shanghai SIPG	Shenzhen
20:35	Jin Qiang (yellow card) 77'; Zhang Yuan (yellow card) 90+9'	Report	Yang Shiyuan (yellow card) 43'; Oscar 49'	Stadium: Shenzhen Universiade Sports Centre; Attendance: 15,712; Referee: (China) Zhang Lei (referee)

6 July 2019 16	Shanghai SIPG	3–1	Shanghai Greenland Shenhua	Shanghai
20:35	Hulk 16' 62'; He Guan (yellow card) 29'; Wang Shenchao 66' (yellow card) 77'; Chen Binbin (yellow card) 86'	Report	Sun Shilin (yellow card) 61'; He Guan 64' (o.g.); Aidi (yellow card) 66'	Stadium: Shanghai Stadium; Attendance: 25,639; Referee: (Bahrain) Nawaf Shukralla

13 July 2019 17	Jiangsu Suning	0–3	Shanghai SIPG	Nanjing
20:35	Ye Chongqiu (red card) 8'; Xie Pengfei (red card) 70'	Report	Hulk 2'; Zhang Wei 17'; Oscar 56'; Lin Chuangyi (yellow card) 82'	Stadium: Nanjing Olympic Sports Center; Attendance: 18,336; Referee: (England) Mark Clattenburg

17 July 2019 18	Shanghai SIPG	3–0	Hebei China Fortune	Shanghai
20:35	Chen Binbin 40'; Hulk 84'; Oscar 86'	Report	Jiang Wenjun (yellow card) 87'	Stadium: Shanghai Stadium; Attendance: 21,912; Referee: (China) Gu Chunhan

21 July 2019 19	Chongqing Dangdai Lifan	2–2	Shanghai SIPG	Chongqing
21:00 UTC+8	Fernandinho 45+1'; Alan Kardec 72' (pen.); Peng Xinli (yellow card) 74'	Report	Yuan Mincheng 51' (o.g.); Li Shenglong (yellow card) 57'; Arnautović 63'; Cai Huikang (yellow card) 69' (yellow-red card) 90'; Zhang Wei (yellow card) 88'; Wei Zhen (yellow card) 89'	Stadium: Chongqing Olympic Sports Center; Attendance: 43,858; Referee: (China) Ai Kun

28 July 2019 20	Wuhan Zall	1–1	Shanghai SIPG	Wuhan
20:35	Liu Yun 4'; Liu Yi (yellow card) 77'	Report	Arnautović 23'; Binbin (yellow card) 84'	Stadium: Dongxihu Sports Center; Attendance: 23,517; Referee: (Serbia) Milorad Mažić

3 August 2019 21	Shanghai SIPG	0–0	Tianjin Tianhai	Shanghai
21:00	Wang Shenchao (yellow card) 45+1' (yellow-red card) 90+6'; He Guan (yellow card) 72'	Report	Wang Xiaolong (yellow card) 20'; Liao Lisheng (yellow card) 23'; Pei Shuai (yellow card) 87'; Yao Junsheng (yellow card) 90+7'	Stadium: Shanghai Stadium; Attendance: 22,733; Referee: (China) Wang Jing

7 August 2019 22	Guangzhou R&F	2–2	Shanghai SIPG	Guangzhou
20:35	Zhang Gong (yellow card) 45+1'; Xiao Zhi 61'; Tošić 90+8'	Report	Shi Ke (yellow card) 38'; Lin Chuangyi (yellow card) 45+2'; Arnautović 69' (pen.); Hu Jinghang 78'	Stadium: Yuexiushan Stadium; Attendance: 13,508; Referee: (China) Ma Ning (referee)

14 August 2019 23	Shanghai SIPG	5–1	Tianjin TEDA	Shanghai
20:35 UTC+8	Lü Wenjun 10'; Arnautović 48'; Li Shenglong 71'; Yu Hai (yellow card) 76'; Cai Huikang 85'; He Guan (yellow card) 88'; Ahmedov 90'	Report	Wagner 18' (yellow card) 62'; Zhao Honglüe (yellow card) 75'	Stadium: Shanghai Stadium; Attendance: 20,003; Referee: (Serbia) Milorad Mažić

13 September 2019 24	Shandong Luneng Taishan	3–1	Shanghai SIPG	Jinan
20:35	Liu Binbin 18'; Zhang Chi 30'; Pellè 31'; Liu Junshuai (yellow card) 34'; Fellaini (yellow card) 56'	Report	Hulk 33'	Stadium: Jinan Olympic Sports Center Stadium; Attendance: 18.509; Referee: (England) Mark Clattenburg

22 September 2019 25	Shanghai SIPG	2–1	Henan Jianye	Shanghai
20:35 UTC+8	Oscar 43'; Li Shenglong 90'	Report	Fernando Karanga 48'; Tim Chow (yellow card) 74'; Wang Shangyuan (yellow card) 85'	Stadium: Shanghai Stadium; Attendance: 19,399; Referee: (China) Wang NJing

19 October 2019 26	Beijing Sinobo Guoan	0–2	Shanghai SIPG	Beijing
20:35	Yu Dabao (yellow card) 24'; Zhang Yuning (yellow card) 83'	Report	Lü Wenjun (yellow card) 12'; Cai Huikang (yellow card) 28'; Li Shenglong 49'; Ahmedov 66'	Stadium: Workers' Stadium; Attendance: 51,810; Referee: (Slovenia) Damir Skomina

27 October 2019 27	Shanghai SIPG	3–0	Dalian Yifang	Shanghai
19:35	Li Shenglong 13'; Zhou Ting 26' (o.g.); Oscar 90+3'	Report	Shan Pengfei (yellow card) 73'; Dong Yanfeng (yellow card) 80'; Zhou Ting (yellow card) 87'	Stadium: Shanghai Stadium; Attendance: 12,635; Referee: (Singapore) Muhammad Taqi (referee)

23 November 2019 28	Guangzhou Evergrande Taobao	2–0	Shanghai SIPG	Guangzhou
19:35	Zhong Yihao (yellow card) 14'; Talisca 44' 90+5' (pen.); Wei Shihao (yellow card) 67'; Zhang Xiuwei (yellow card) 76'; Mei Fang (yellow card) 90+4'; Huang Bowen (yellow card) 90+6'	Report	Shi Ke (yellow card) 18'; Arnautović (yellow card) 76'; Lin Chuangyi (yellow card) 77'; Oscar (yellow card) 90+3'; Hulk (yellow card) 90+4'	Stadium: Tianhe Stadium; Attendance: 49,973; Referee: (Hungary) Viktor Kassai

27 November 2019 29	Beijing Renhe	1–1	Shanghai SIPG	Beijing
19:35	Yang Yihu (yellow card) 28'; Diop 57'; Chen Jie (yellow card) 90'; Zhang Lie (yellow card) 90'	Report	Arnautović 3'; Zhang Wei (yellow card) 21'; Hulk (yellow card) 79'; Shi Ke (yellow card) 84' (yellow-red card) 90'; Cai Huikang (yellow card) 90+2'	Stadium: Beijing Fengtai Stadium; Attendance: 1,253; Referee: (China) Wang Jin

1 December 2019 30	Shanghai SIPG	6–0	Shenzhen F.C.	Shanghai
15:00	Arnautović 10' 47' 54' 62'; Hulk 29'; Oscar 74'	Report	Liu Yiming (yellow card) 86'; Qiao Wei (red card) 88'	Stadium: Shanghai Stadium; Attendance: 19,203; Referee: (New Zealand) Matthew Conger

=== Chinese FA Cup ===
1 May 2019 Fourth Round	Wuhan Zall	1–3	Shanghai SIPG	Wuhan
16:00	Nie Aoshuang (yellow card) 12'; Li Chao (yellow card) 39'; Yan Junling 55' (o.g.)	Report	Fu Huan 13'; Lü Wenjun 34'; Oscar 40'	Stadium: Wuhan Five Rings Sports Center; Attendance: 8,172; Referee: (China) Ma Li

29 May 2019 Round of 16	Shanghai SIPG	4–0	Jilin Baijia	Shanghai
19:00	Yang Shiyuan 45+1' 70'; Li Shenglong 82'; Hu Jinghang 88'	Report	Chen Tao (yellow card) 80'; Song Xicun (yellow card) 87'	Stadium: Shanghai Stadium; Attendance: 17,003; Referee: (China) Gu Chunhan

24 July 2019 Quarter Final	Guangzhou Evergrande Taobao	0–2	Shanghai SIPG	Guangzhou
21:00	Gao Zhunyi (yellow card) 59'; Park Ji-soo (yellow card) 90+4'	Report	Hulk 14'; Oscar 75'; Yan Junling (yellow card) 84'; Li Shenglong (yellow card) 89'	Stadium: Tianhe Stadium; Attendance: 48,791; Referee: (England) Mark Clattenburg

20 August 2019 Semi Final	Shanghai SIPG	0–2	Shandong Luneng Taishan	Shanghai
20:35	Arnautović (yellow card) 45+5'; Yang Shiyuan (yellow card) 81'	Report	Fellaini (yellow card) 12' (goal) 40'; Liu Junshuai (yellow card) 37'; Pellè (yellow card) 45+5'; Wang Dalei (yellow card) 45+5'; Liu Yang (red card) 45+4'; Zhang Chi 70'	Stadium: Shanghai Stadium; Attendance: 22,593; Referee: (New Zealand) Matthew Conger

=== Chinese FA Super Cup ===
23 February 2019	Shanghai SIPG	2–0	Beijing Sinobo Guoan	Suzhou
19:35	Wang Shenchao 61'; Lü Wenjun 65'			Stadium: Suzhou Olympic Sports Centre; Attendance: 25,132

=== AFC Champions League ===
==== Group stage ====
Pos	Team	Pld	W	D	L	GF	GA	GD	Pts	Qualification	ULS	SSI	KAW	SYD
1	(South Korea) Ulsan Hyundai	6	3	2	1	5	7	−2	11	Advance to knockout stage	—	1–0	1–0	1–0
2	(China) Shanghai SIPG	6	2	3	1	13	8	+5	9	Advance to knockout stage	5–0	—	1–0	2–2
3	(Japan) Kawasaki Frontale	6	2	2	2	9	6	+3	8		2–2	2–2	—	1–0
4	(Australia) Sydney FC	6	0	3	3	5	11	−6	3		0–0	3–3	0–4	—

Source: AFC
Rules for classification: Group stage tiebreakers

6 March 2019 1	Shanghai SIPG (China)	1–0	(Japan) Kawasaki Frontale	Shanghai
19:30 UTC+8	Hulk 89' (pen.)	Live Report; Stats Report		Stadium: Shanghai Stadium; Attendance: 22,777; Referee: Mohammed Abdulla Hassan Mohamed (United Arab Emirates)

13 March 2019 2	Ulsan Hyundai (South Korea)	1–0	(China) Shanghai SIPG	Ulsan
19:00 UTC+9	Kim Tae-hwan (yellow card) 63'; Júnior Negrão 66'	Live Report; Stats Report	Wei Zhen (yellow card) 12'	Stadium: Ulsan Munsu Football Stadium; Attendance: 4,265; Referee: (Jordan) Ahmad Yacoub Ibrahim

10 April 2019 3	Sydney FC (Australia)	3–3	(China) Shanghai SIPG	Sydney
19:30 UTC+10	de Jong 3'; Le Fondre 32' (pen.); Brosque 84'	Live Report; Stats Report	Yu Hai (yellow card) 23' (goal) 36'; Lü Wenjun 27' (yellow card) 42'; Elkeson 89'	Stadium: Jubilee Oval; Attendance: 7,154; Referee: (Iran) Alireza Faghani

23 April 2019 4	Shanghai SIPG (China)	2–2	(Australia) Sydney FC	Shanghai
20:30	He Guan (yellow card) 22'; Elkeson 47'; Lü Wenjun (yellow card) 52'; Wang Shenchao 59'	Live Report; Stats Report	O'Neill 33'; Le Fondre 62'	Stadium: Shanghai Stadium; Attendance: 21,989; Referee: (Qatar) Abdulrahman Al-Jassim

7 May 2019 5	Kawasaki Frontale (Japan)	2–2	(China) Shanghai SIPG	Kawasaki
19:00 UTC+9	Leandro Damião 13' (yellow card) 63'; Morita (yellow card) 58'; Taniguchi 66' (yellow card) 88'	Live Report; Stats Report	Hulk 6' 71'; Cai Huikang (yellow card) 35'	Stadium: Todoroki Athletics Stadium; Attendance: 11,708; Referee: (Uzbekistan) Ravshan Irmatov

21 May 2019 6	Shanghai SIPG (China)	5–0	(South Korea) Ulsan Hyundai	Shanghai
18:00 UTC+8	Oscar 7' 42' 76'; Li Shenglong 67'; Hu Jinghang 88'	Report		Stadium: Shanghai Stadium; Attendance: 22,763; Referee: (Uzbekistan) Aziz Asymov

==== Round of 16 ====
19 June 2019 First leg	Shanghai SIPG (China)	1–1	(South Korea) Jeonbuk Hyundai Motors	Shanghai
21:00	Wang Shenchao 39'; Hulk (yellow card) 48'; Wei Zhen (yellow card) 53'	Report	Moon Seon-min 1'; Hong Jeong-ho (yellow card) 50'; Kim Jin-su (yellow card) 60'	Stadium: Shanghai Stadium; Attendance: 20,007; Referee: (Bahrain) Nawaf Shukralla

26 June 2019 Second leg	Jeonbuk Hyundai Motors (South Korea)	1–1 (2–2 agg.) (3–5 p)	(China) Shanghai SIPG	Jeonju
21:00	Kim Shin-wook 27'; Hong Jeong-ho (yellow card) 110'; Moon Seon-min (red card) 120+2'	Report	He Guan (yellow card) 46'; Hulk 80'; Shi Ke (yellow card) 90+4'; Li Shenglong (yellow card) 120+4'	Stadium: Jeonju World Cup Stadium; Attendance: 11,095; Referee: (Iran) Alireza Faghani

==== Quarter-finals ====
27 August 2019 First leg	Shanghai SIPG (China)	2–2	(Japan) Urawa Red Diamonds	Shanghai
20:30	Hulk (yellow card) 45+2' (goal) 49' (pen.) 71' (pen.)	Report	Makino 3'; Koroki 30'; Maurício Antônio (yellow card) 69'	Stadium: Shanghai Stadium; Attendance: 24,573; Referee: (United Arab Emirates) Mohammed Abdulla Hassan Mohamed

17 September 2019 First leg	(Japan) Urawa Red Diamonds	1–1 (3–3 agg.)	Shanghai SIPG (China)	Saitama
19:30	Koroki 39'; Nagasawa (yellow card) 88'; Nishikawa (yellow card) 89'	Report	Wang Shenchao (yellow card) 34' (goal) 60'; Arnautović (yellow card) 42'; Oscar (yellow card) 88'	Stadium: Saitama Stadium 2002; Attendance: 28,533; Referee: (Iraq) Mohanad Qasim Sarray
