= 2024 Shanghai Port F.C. season =

Shanghai Port
2024 season
- Manager: (Australia) Kevin Muscat
- Stadium: Pudong Football Stadium
- Super League: 1st
- FA Cup: Winners
Home colours	Away colours

The 2024 Shanghai Port F.C. season will be the clubs 19th in the clubs history.During this season the club will participate in the following competitions:Chinese Super League, FA Cup, AFC Champions League Elite.

== Squad ==
=== First-team squad ===
As of 5 February 2025

Note: Flags indicate national team as defined under FIFA eligibility rules; some limited exceptions apply. Players may hold more than one non-FIFA nationality.

No.	Pos.	Nation	Player
1	GK	CHN	Yan Junling
2	DF	CHN	Li Ang
3	DF	CHN	Jiang Guangtai
4	DF	CHN	Wang Shenchao
5	DF	CHN	Zhang Linpeng
6	MF	CHN	Xu Xin
7	FW	CHN	Wu Lei
9	FW	BRA	Gustavo
10	MF	BRA	Mateus Vital
11	FW	CHN	Lü Wenjun
12	GK	CHN	Chen Wei
13	DF	CHN	Wei Zhen
14	FW	CHN	Li Shenglong
15	DF	CHN	Ming Tian
18	FW	CHN	Afrden Asqer
19	DF	CHN	Wang Zhen'ao

No.	Pos.	Nation	Player
20	MF	CHN	Yang Shiyuan
22	MF	BRA	Matheus Jussa
23	DF	CHN	Fu Huan
25	GK	CHN	Du Jia
26	FW	CHN	Liu Ruofan
27	FW	CHN	Feng Jin
28	DF	CHN	He Guan
30	FW	BRA	Gabrielzinho (on loan from Moreirense)
32	DF	CHN	Li Shuai
36	MF	CHN	Ablahan Haliq
41	GK	CHN	Liang Kun
45	FW	BRA	Leonardo
46	FW	CHN	Liu Baiyang
47	FW	CHN	Li Xinxiang
52	MF	CHN	Meng Jingchao

== Competitions ==
=== Chinese Super League ===
==== Table ====
Pos	Team	Pld	W	D	L	GF	GA	GD	Pts	Qualification or relegation
1	Shanghai Port (C)	30	25	3	2	96	30	+66	78	Qualification for AFC Champions League Elite league stage
2	Shanghai Shenhua	30	24	5	1	73	20	+53	77	Qualification for AFC Champions League Elite league stage
3	Chengdu Rongcheng	30	18	5	7	65	31	+34	59	Qualification for AFC Champions League Elite play-off round
4	Beijing Guoan	30	16	8	6	65	35	+30	56	Qualification for AFC Champions League Two group stage
5	Shandong Taishan	30	13	9	8	49	40	+9	48	

Source: Soccerway
Rules for classification:
- During season: 1) Points; 2) Head-to-head points; 3) Head-to-head goal difference; 4) Head-to-head goals scored; 5) Goal difference; 6) Goals scored; 7) Rankings in the previous season. (Rules 2 to 4 are only applied when teams concerned have finished both/all the matches against others.)
- After season: 1) Points; 2) Head-to-head points; 3) Head-to-head goal difference; 4) Head-to-head goals scored; 5) Goal difference; 6) Goals scored; 7) Disciplinary points (yellow card = 1 point, red card = 3 points); 8) Drawing of lots.
  (C) Champions

==== Results summary ====
Overall								Home						Away					
Pld	W	D	L	GF	GA	GD	Pts	W	D	L	GF	GA	GD	W	D	L	GF	GA	GD
30	25	3	2	96	30	+66	78	14	1	0	59	15	+44	11	2	2	37	15	+22

Last updated: 2 November 2024.
Source: League table

==== Results by round ====
Round	1	2	3	4	5	6	7	8	9	10	11	12	13	14	15	16	17	18	19	20	21	22	23	24	25	26	27	28	29	30
Ground	H	A	H	A	A	H	A	H	A	A	H	A	H	H	A	A	H	A	H	H	A	H	A	H	H	A	H	A	A	H
Result	W	D	W	D	W	W	W	D	W	W	W	W	W	W	W	W	W	W	W	W	W	W	L	W	W	W	W	L	W	W
Position	2	4	3	3	3	3	3	2	2	2	1	1	1	1	1	1	1	1	1	1	1	1	1	1	1	1	1	1	1	1

Updated to match(es) played on 2 November 2024. Source: Competitive matches
A = Away; H = Home; W = Win; D = Draw; L = Loss

==== Matches ====
All times are local (UTC+8).

1 March 2024 1	Shanghai Port	3-1	Wuhan Three Towns	Shanghai
20:00 CST	Wang Zhen'ao (yellow card) 17'; Wu Lei 33' 75'; Wang Shenchao 90+2'	Report	Denny Wang 20'; He Chao (yellow card) 36'	Stadium: SAIC Motor Pudong Arena; Attendance: 21,713; Referee: (China) Fu Ming

9 March 2024 2	Zhejiang	0-0	Shanghai Port	Hangzhou
19:30 CST	Li Tixiang (yellow card) 1'; Dong Yu (yellow card) 65'; Sun Zheng'ao (yellow card) 72' (yellow-red card) 90+6'; Zhang Jiaqi (yellow card) 90+2'	Report	Wang Zhen'ao (yellow card) 22'; Matheus Jussa (yellow card) 90+3'	Stadium: Huanglong Sports Center; Attendance: 32,087; Referee: (China) Ahmet Memetjan

30 March 2024 3	Shanghai Port	3-1	Henan	Shanghai
20:00 CST	Wu Lei 56'; Yang Shiyuan (yellow card) 57'; Zhang Linpeng 89'; Vargas 90+7' (yellow card) 90+9'	Report	Xu Haofeng (yellow card) 77'; Čović 83'	Stadium: SAIC Motor Pudong Arena; Attendance: 20,573; Referee: (China) Zhang Lei

5 April 2024 4	Beijing Guoan	2-2	Shanghai Port	Beijing
20:30 CST	Guga 27' (yellow card) 45+3'; Hou Sen (yellow card) 90'; Zhang Yuning 82' (pen.); Zhang Yuan (yellow card) 90+2'	Report	Wu Lei 10' 90+6'; Wang Shenchao (yellow card) 72'; Li Shuai (yellow card) 76'	Stadium: Workers' Stadium; Attendance: 53,898; Referee: (China) Ahmet Memetjan

9 April 2024 5	Nantong Zhiyun	0-3	Shanghai Port	Rugao
19:00 CST	Anthony (yellow card) 12'; Luo Xin (red card) 45'	Report	Oscar 13' (pen.) 45+2' (pen.); Li Ang 53'; Li Shenglong (yellow card) 85'	Stadium: Rugao Olympic Sports Center; Attendance: 13,913; Referee: (China) Jianxin Du

14 April 2024 6	Shanghai Port	4-3	Shandong Taishan	Shanghai
20:30 CST	Gustavo 6'; Zhang Linpeng (yellow card) 22'; Léo Cittadini 33'; Wu Lei 54' 73'; Wang Zhen'ao (yellow card) 70'; Oscar (yellow card) 90+10'	Report	Zhang Linpeng 12' (o.g.); Pedro Delgado 23'; Jadson 29'; Gao Zhunyi (yellow card) 32'; Tong Lei (yellow card) 75'	Stadium: SAIC Motor Pudong Arena; Attendance: 23,870; Referee: (China) Ma Ning

27 April 2024 8	Shanghai Port	1-1	Shanghai Shenhua	Shanghai
20:30 CST	Wang Zhen'ao (yellow card) 16'; Li Ang (yellow card) 43'; Gustavo 59'; Matheus Jussa (yellow card) 61'; Yan Junling (yellow card) 90+7'; Li Shenglong (yellow card) 90+9'	Report	Gao Tianyi (yellow card) 3'; Yang Zexiang (yellow card) 82'; João Carlos Teixeira 90'; Wang Haijian (yellow card) 90+5'	Stadium: SAIC Motor Pudong Arena; Attendance: 24,783; Referee: (China) Fu Ming

1 May 2024 9	Qingdao Hainiu	0-5	Shanghai Port	Qingdao
19:00 CST	Li Hailong (yellow card) 77'; Zhong Jinbao (yellow card) 81'	Report	Wu Lei 27' 87'; Gustavo 30' 60'; Wang Shenchao 78'	Stadium: Qingdao Youth Football Stadium; Attendance: 23,346; Referee: (China) Wei Wang
