= Chen Binbin =

Chinese footballer (born 1998)

Chen Binbin 陈彬彬
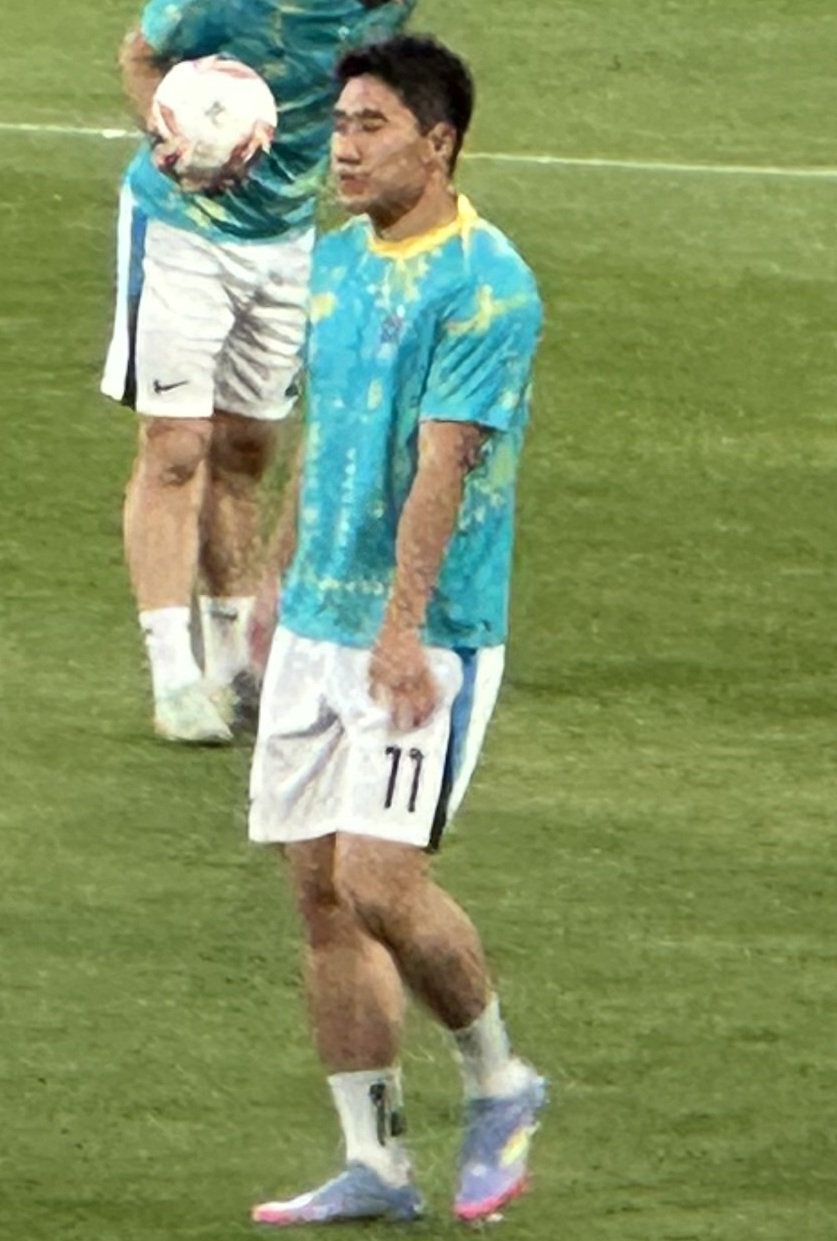
- Chen Binbin in May 2025

Personal information
- Full name: Chen Binbin
- Date of birth: 10 June 1998 (age 28)
- Place of birth: Huaibin, Henan, China
- Height: 1.77 m (5 ft 9 1/2 in)
- Position: Left winger

Team information
- Current team: Liaoning Tieren
- Number: 11

Youth career
- 2011–2014: Genbao Football Base
- 2014–2016: Shanghai SIPG

Senior career*
Years	Team	Apps	(Gls)
2017–2024	Shanghai Port	62	(1)
2022	→ Kataller Toyama (loan)	0	(0)
2025	Nantong Zhiyun	28	(4)
2026–	Liaoning Tieren	29	(2)

International career^{‡}
2018–2020	China U-23	26	(3)
2018–	China	2	(0)
- * Club domestic league appearances and goals as of 22 November 2026 ‡ National team caps and goals as of 15 January 2020

Chen Binbin (simplified Chinese: 陈彬彬; traditional Chinese: 陳彬彬; pinyin: Chén Bīnbīn; born 10 June 1998) is a Chinese footballer who plays for Liaoning Tieren, of the Chinese Super League.

== Club career ==
Chen Binbin started his football career when he joined Shanghai SIPG's youth academy in 2014 after Shanghai International Port Group bought the club and under-17 team from Xu Genbao. He was promoted to the first team squad by then manager André Villas-Boas in the 2017 season. He made his debut for the club on 9 July 2017 in a 4–2 away loss against Changchun Yatai. He scored his first goal for the club on 17 July 2019 in a 3–0 home win against Hebei China Fortune His contract with Shanghai SIPG runs until 2024.

On 11 August 2022 Chen Binbin signed for J3 League side Kataller Toyama on loan until 31 December 2022.

On 19 February 2025, Chen joined China League One club Nantong Zhiyun. After one year, Chen left the club and joined Liaoning Tieren at the 2026 season.

== International career ==
Chen made his debut for the Chinese national team on 26 May 2018 in a 1–0 win against Myanmar, coming on as a substitute for Huang Zichang in the 76th minute.

== Career statistics ==
=== Club statistics ===
As of 31 December 2020.

Appearances and goals by club, season and competition
Club	Season	League			National Cup		Continental		Other		Total	
Club	Season	Division	Apps	Goals	Apps	Goals	Apps	Goals	Apps	Goals	Apps	Goals
Shanghai SIPG	2017	Chinese Super League	1	0	1	0	0	0	-		2	0
Shanghai SIPG	2018	Chinese Super League	19	0	4	0	1	0	-		24	0
Shanghai SIPG	2019	Chinese Super League	18	1	2	0	1	0	0 (Note: Appearances in Chinese FA Super Cup)	0	21	1
Shanghai SIPG	2020	Chinese Super League	13	0	1	0	8	0	-		22	0
Shanghai SIPG	Total		51	1	8	0	10	0	0	0	69	1
Career total			51	1	8	0	10	0	0	0	69	1

=== International statistics ===
National team
Year	Apps	Goals
2018	2	0
Total	2	0

== Honours ==
Shanghai Port

- Chinese Super League: 2018, 2024
- Chinese FA Cup: 2024
- Chinese FA Super Cup: 2019
