= Cai Huikang =

Chinese footballer (born 1989)

Cai Huikang 蔡慧康
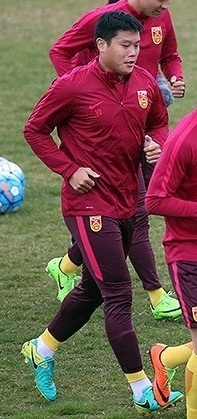

Personal information
- Full name: Cai Huikang
- Date of birth: 10 October 1989 (age 37)
- Place of birth: Shanghai, China
- Height: 1.83 m (6 ft 0 in)
- Position: Defensive midfielder

Youth career
- 2000–2005: Genbao Football Academy

Senior career*
| Years | Team | Apps | (Gls) |
| 2006–2024 | Shanghai Port | 364 | (11) |
| Total | | 364 | (11) |

International career
| 2014–2019 | China | 22 | (0) |
Medal record
Representing China
Men's football
EAFF Championship
| Silver medal – second place | 2015 China | Team |
| Bronze medal – third place | 2019 South Korea | Team |
- * Club domestic league appearances and goals

Cai Huikang
- Chinese: 蔡慧康
Transcriptions
Standard Mandarin
- Hanyu Pinyin: Cài Huìkāng
- IPA: [tsʰâɪ xwêɪ kʰáŋ]

Cai Huikang (Chinese: 蔡慧康; pinyin: Cài Huìkāng; born 10 October 1989) is a Chinese former footballer who played for Shanghai Port.

== Club career ==
Cai Huikang started his football career when he joined the Genbao Football Academy in 2000 and was promoted to Shanghai SIPG's (later to be renamed as Shanghai Port) first team during the 2006 season. He became a regular as Shanghai won promotion to the second tier in the 2007 season. He scored his first goal for the club on 18 April 2008 in a 1–1 draw against Beijing Hongdeng. He lost his starting role during the 2011 season and was linked with a move to Guangdong Sunray Cave at the end of the season. Cai decided to stay at the club and appeared in 29 league matches in the 2012 season as Shanghai won the second-tier league title and was subsequently promoted to the top flight.

Cai would establish himself as a vital member of the team throughout the 2013 Chinese Super League campaign as the club finished in ninth while also gaining significant investment from Shanghai International Port. He would go on to be an integral member of the team that would come runners-up within the 2015 Chinese Super League and qualification for the AFC Champions League for the first time in the clubs history. He would go on to be a consistent presence within the team as he won the 2018 Chinese Super League title with the club.

In 2025, Cai became the assistant coach of Shanghai U15 team.

== International career ==
Cai made his debut for the Chinese national team on 18 June 2014 in a 2–0 win against Macedonia.

== Career statistics ==
=== Club ===
Appearances and goals by club, season and competition
| Club | Season | League | | | National Cup | | Continental | | Other | | Total | |
| Club | Season | Division | Apps | Goals | Apps | Goals | Apps | Goals | Apps | Goals | Apps | Goals |
|---|---|---|---|---|---|---|---|---|---|---|---|---|
| Shanghai SIPG/ Shanghai Port | 2006 | China League Two | | | - | | - | | - | | | |
| Shanghai SIPG/ Shanghai Port | 2007 | China League Two | | | - | | - | | - | | | |
| Shanghai SIPG/ Shanghai Port | 2008 | China League One | 22 | 1 | - | | - | | - | | 22 | 1 |
| Shanghai SIPG/ Shanghai Port | 2009 | China League One | 23 | 2 | - | | - | | - | | 23 | 2 |
| Shanghai SIPG/ Shanghai Port | 2010 | China League One | 20 | 0 | - | | - | | - | | 20 | 0 |
| Shanghai SIPG/ Shanghai Port | 2011 | China League One | 16 | 0 | 1 | 0 | - | | - | | 17 | 0 |
| Shanghai SIPG/ Shanghai Port | 2012 | China League One | 29 | 1 | 2 | 0 | - | | - | | 31 | 1 |
| Shanghai SIPG/ Shanghai Port | 2013 | Chinese Super League | 30 | 0 | 0 | 0 | - | | - | | 30 | 0 |
| Shanghai SIPG/ Shanghai Port | 2014 | Chinese Super League | 27 | 0 | 0 | 0 | - | | - | | 27 | 0 |
| Shanghai SIPG/ Shanghai Port | 2015 | Chinese Super League | 27 | 1 | 2 | 0 | - | | - | | 29 | 1 |
| Shanghai SIPG/ Shanghai Port | 2016 | Chinese Super League | 27 | 1 | 2 | 0 | 9 | 0 | - | | 38 | 1 |
| Shanghai SIPG/ Shanghai Port | 2017 | Chinese Super League | 28 | 0 | 7 | 0 | 12 | 0 | - | | 47 | 0 |
| Shanghai SIPG/ Shanghai Port | 2018 | Chinese Super League | 27 | 2 | 4 | 1 | 8 | 0 | - | | 39 | 3 |
| Shanghai SIPG/ Shanghai Port | 2019 | Chinese Super League | 26 | 2 | 2 | 0 | 9 | 0 | 1 (Note: Appearances in Chinese FA Super Cup) | 0 | 38 | 2 |
| Shanghai SIPG/ Shanghai Port | 2020 | Chinese Super League | 8 | 0 | 0 | 0 | 4 | 1 | - | | 12 | 1 |
| Shanghai SIPG/ Shanghai Port | 2021 | Chinese Super League | 1 | 0 | 1 | 0 | 0 | 0 | - | | 2 | 0 |
| Shanghai SIPG/ Shanghai Port | 2022 | Chinese Super League | 24 | 1 | 3 | 0 | - | | - | | 27 | 1 |
| Shanghai SIPG/ Shanghai Port | 2023 | Chinese Super League | 25 | 0 | 2 | 0 | 1 | 0 | - | | 28 | 0 |
| Shanghai SIPG/ Shanghai Port | 2024 | Chinese Super League | 4 | 0 | 1 | 0 | 0 | 0 | 0 | 0 | 5 | 0 |
| Shanghai SIPG/ Shanghai Port | Total | | 364 | 11 | 27 | 1 | 43 | 1 | 1 | 0 | 435 | 13 |
| Career total | | | 364 | 11 | 27 | 1 | 43 | 1 | 1 | 0 | 435 | 13 |

=== International ===
National team
| Year | Apps | Goals |
|---|---|---|
| 2014 | 7 | 0 |
| 2015 | 9 | 0 |
| 2016 | 2 | 0 |
| 2017 | 2 | 0 |
| 2018 | 1 | 0 |
| 2019 | 1 | 0 |
| Total | 22 | 0 |

== Honours ==
Shanghai Port

- Chinese Super League: 2018, 2023, 2024
- Chinese FA Cup: 2024
- China League One: 2012
- China League Two: 2007
- Chinese FA Super Cup: 2019
