= Xiao Mingjie =

Chinese association football player

Personal information
- Date of birth: 14 January 1997 (age 29)
- Height: 1.77 m (5 ft 10 in)
- Position: Defender

Team information
- Current team: Hubei WHSU Zaiming

Senior career*
Years	Team	Apps	(Gls)
2019–2022	Shanghai SIPG	1	(0)
2022-	Hubei WHSU Zaiming	0	(0)
- * Club domestic league appearances and goals as of 14:01, 21 April 2022 (UTC)

Xiao Mingjie (simplified Chinese: 肖明杰; traditional Chinese: 肖明傑; pinyin: Xiào Míngjié; born 14 January 1997) is a Chinese footballer currently playing as a defender for Hubei WHSU Zaiming.

== Club career ==
Xiao Mingjie was promoted to the senior team of Shanghai SIPG within the 2019 Chinese Super League season and would make his debut in league game on 30 March 2019 against Hebei China Fortune F.C. in a 2–1 victory where he came on as a substitute for Fu Huan.

== Career statistics ==
As of 31 December 2020.

Appearances and goals by club, season and competition
Club	Season	League			National Cup		Continental		Other		Total	
Club	Season	Division	Apps	Goals	Apps	Goals	Apps	Goals	Apps	Goals	Apps	Goals
Shanghai SIPG	2019	Chinese Super League	1	0	1	0	0	0	0 (Note: Appearances in Chinese FA Super Cup)	0	2	0
Shanghai SIPG	2020	Chinese Super League	0	0	1	0	0	0	-		1	0
Shanghai SIPG	Total		1	0	2	0	0	0	0	0	3	0
Career total			1	0	2	0	0	0	0	0	3	0
