= Lin Chuangyi =

Chinese footballer (born 1993)

Lin Chuangyi 林创益
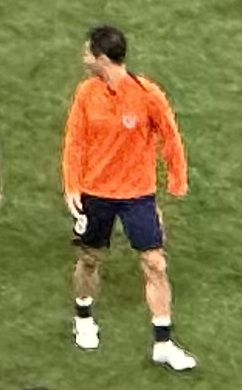
- Lin Chuangyi in May 2025

Personal information
- Date of birth: 28 January 1993 (age 33)
- Place of birth: Shantou, Guangdong, China
- Height: 1.78 m (5 ft 10 in)
- Position: Defensive midfielder

Team information
- Current team: Qingdao Hainiu
- Number: 8

Youth career
- 2005–2006: Shanghai Shenhua
- 2006–2012: Shanghai Dongya

Senior career*
Years	Team	Apps	(Gls)
2011–2012	Shanghai Zobon	?	(7)
2013–2020	Shanghai SIPG	115	(0)
2021–2023	Cangzhou Mighty Lions	62	(0)
2024	Shenzhen Peng City	17	(0)
2025–	Qingdao Hainiu	51	(4)

International career
2009–2010	China U-17		
2011–2012	China U-20		
- * Club domestic league appearances and goals as of 22 November 2026

Lin Chuangyi (Chinese: 林创益; pinyin: Lín Chuàngyì; born 28 January 1993) is a Chinese football player who currently plays for Chinese Super League side Qingdao Hainiu.

== Club career ==
Lin started his professional football career in 2011 when he was promoted to Shanghai Zobon's squad for the 2011 China League Two campaign. He joined Chinese Super League's newcomer Shanghai Dongya in 2013. On 8 March 2013, he made his Super League debut for Shanghai Dongya, in a 4–1 away defeat against Beijing Guoan, coming on as a substitute for Lü Wenjun in the 67th minute.

On 21 May 2013, Lin scored his first goal and provided an assist for Shanghai Dongya in the third round of 2013 Chinese FA Cup which Shanghai beat Chongqing Lifan in the penalty shootout. Failing to establish himself in the striker position, he swifted to winger, attacking midfielder and defensive midfielder under manager Sven-Göran Eriksson and to full-back under manager André Villas-Boas. On 14 April 2018, Lin scored his second goal for the club in the last group stage match of 2018 AFC Champions League which Shanghai SIPG lost to Melbourne Victory 2–1.

On 31 March 2021, Lin transferred to fellow top-tier club Cangzhou Mighty Lions for the start of the 2021 Chinese Super League campaign. He would go on to make his debut for the club on 21 April 2021 in a league game against Qingdao F.C. in a 2–1 defeat. He would go on to establish himself as regular within the team by making 19 appearances for the club throughout the season.

On 16 January 2025, Lin signed with Chinese Super League club Qingdao Hainiu as free agent.

== Career statistics ==
Statistics accurate as of match played 31 January 2023.

Appearances and goals by club, season and competition
Club	Season	League			National Cup		Continental		Other		Total	
Club	Season	Division	Apps	Goals	Apps	Goals	Apps	Goals	Apps	Goals	Apps	Goals
Shanghai Zobon	2011	China League Two			-		-		-			
Shanghai Zobon	2012	China League Two			0	0	-		-			
Shanghai Zobon	Total			7	0	0	0	0	0	0		7
Shanghai Dongya	2013	Chinese Super League	18	0	2	1	-		-		20	1
Shanghai Dongya	2014	Chinese Super League	15	0	1	0	-		-		16	0
Shanghai Dongya	2015	Chinese Super League	15	0	2	0	-		-		17	0
Shanghai Dongya	2016	Chinese Super League	12	0	1	0	5	0	-		18	0
Shanghai Dongya	2017	Chinese Super League	19	0	5	0	7	0	-		31	0
Shanghai Dongya	2018	Chinese Super League	7	0	1	0	5	1	-		13	1
Shanghai Dongya	2019	Chinese Super League	18	0	3	0	6	0	0 (Note: Appearances in Chinese FA Super Cup)	0	27	0
Shanghai Dongya	2020	Chinese Super League	11	0	1	0	4	0	-		16	0
Shanghai Dongya	Total		115	0	16	1	27	1	0	0	158	2
Cangzhou Mighty Lions	2021	Chinese Super League	18	0	1	0	-		-		19	0
Cangzhou Mighty Lions	2022	Chinese Super League	28	0	0	0	-		-		28	0
Cangzhou Mighty Lions	Total		42	0	1	0	0	0	0	0	43	0
Career total			157	7	17	1	27	1	0	0	201	9

== Honours ==
=== Club ===
Shanghai SIPG

- Chinese Super League: 2018
- Chinese FA Super Cup: 2019
