= Hu Jinghang =

Chinese footballer

Hu Jinghang 胡靖航
Personal information
- Full name: Hu Jinghang
- Date of birth: 23 March 1997 (age 29)
- Place of birth: Ezhou, Hubei, China
- Height: 1.83 m (6 ft 0 in)
- Position: Forward

Team information
- Current team: Nanjing City
- Number: 33

Youth career
- Shanghai SIPG

Senior career*
| Years | Team | Apps | (Gls) |
| 2016–2021 | Shanghai SIPG | 31 | (2) |
| 2017 | → Henan Jianye (loan) | 27 | (3) |
| 2018 | → Henan Jianye (loan) | 13 | (0) |
| 2020 | → Wuhan Zall (loan) | 14 | (3) |
| 2022 | Wuhan Yangtze River | 29 | (1) |
| 2023 | Shandong Taishan | 4 | (3) |
| 2024–2025 | Qingdao Hainiu | 18 | (0) |
| 2025– | Nanjing City | 4 | (0) |

International career^{‡}
| 2015–2016 | China U19 | 13 | (2) |
| 2017–2020 | China U22 | 16 | (0) |
- * Club domestic league appearances and goals as of 25 November 2023 ‡ National team caps and goals as of 18 February 2019

Hu Jinghang (Chinese: 胡靖航; born 23 March 1997 in Ezhou) is a Chinese professional footballer who currently plays for China League One club Nanjing City.

== Club career ==
=== Shanghai SIPG ===
Hu Jinghang started his professional football career in July 2015 when he was promoted to Shanghai SIPG's first squad. On 9 February 2016, Hu made his debut for Shanghai SIPG in the 2016 AFC Champions League qualifying play-off against Muangthong United, coming on as a substitute for Asamoah Gyan in the 90th minute. He made his Super League debut on 29 May 2016 in a 1–1 away draw against Guangzhou Evergrande, coming on for Lü Wenjun in the 80th minute.

==== Henan Jianye (loan) ====
On 28 February 2017, Hu was loaned to Henan Jianye for the 2017 season. On 5 March 2017, he made his debut for Henan in a 0–0 home draw against Hebei China Fortune. On 3 May 2017, he scored his first senior goal in the 2017 Chinese FA Cup in a 5–1 away win against China League Two club Shanghai Sunfun. His first league goal came on three days later on 6 May 2017 in a 3–2 win against Chongqing Lifan as Henan Jianye secured their first league victory of the season. He scored another goal on 5 August 2017, in a 2–2 away draw against Jiangsu Suning. On 24 September 2017, he scored his third league goal of the season against Shandong Luneng Taishan in a 2–1 win. Hu scored four goals in 29 appearances in the 2017 season and won the Chinese Football Association Young Player of the Year Award.

Hu returned to Shanghai SIPG in January 2018. On 9 July 2018, he was loaned to Henan Jianye for the second time until the end of 2018 season, but this time failed to score a goal in his second loan spell.

==== Wuhan Zall (loan) ====
In February 2020, Hu joined fellow Chinese Super League club Wuhan Zall on loan. On 17 August 2020, he scored his first goal for Wuhan in a 2-0 win against Chongqing Dangdai Lifan. On 22 November 2020, he played full 90 minutes in a 1-0 win against Zhejiang Energy Greentown in the second leg of the relegation/promotion play-offs and helped the team stay up.

=== Return to Wuhan ===
In March 2022, Hu returned to Wuhan Yangtze River (formerly named Wuhan Zall) on a free transfer after his contract with Shanghai Port was expired. This time he was not able to prevent the team's relegation and the club was subsequently dissolved.

=== Shandong Taishan ===
On 11 April 2023, Hu joined fellow Chinese Super League club Shandong Taishan. His opportunities were limited throughout his first season at Shandong and finally made his first start for the club in their final league game, a 5-1 home win against his former club Henan. He scored his first goal for Shandong in the injury time of the first half and then completed his first career hat trick within the first 10 minutes of second half.

== Career statistics ==
Statistics accurate as of match played 25 November 2023.

Appearances and goals by club, season and competition
| Club | Season | League | | | National Cup | | Continental | | Other | | Total | |
| Club | Season | Division | Apps | Goals | Apps | Goals | Apps | Goals | Apps | Goals | Apps | Goals |
|---|---|---|---|---|---|---|---|---|---|---|---|---|
| Shanghai SIPG | 2016 | Chinese Super League | 2 | 0 | 1 | 0 | 2 | 0 | - | | 5 | 0 |
| Shanghai SIPG | 2018 | Chinese Super League | 11 | 0 | 3 | 0 | 3 | 0 | - | | 17 | 0 |
| Shanghai SIPG | 2019 | Chinese Super League | 11 | 1 | 2 | 1 | 1 | 1 | 0 (Note: Appearance(s) in Chinese FA Super Cup) | 0 | 14 | 3 |
| Shanghai SIPG | 2021 | Chinese Super League | 7 | 1 | 5 | 0 | 1 | 0 | - | | 13 | 1 |
| Shanghai SIPG | Total | | 31 | 2 | 11 | 1 | 7 | 1 | 0 | 0 | 49 | 4 |
| Henan Jianye (loan) | 2017 | Chinese Super League | 27 | 3 | 2 | 1 | - | | - | | 29 | 4 |
| Henan Jianye (loan) | 2018 | Chinese Super League | 13 | 0 | 0 | 0 | - | | - | | 13 | 0 |
| Henan Total | | | 40 | 3 | 2 | 1 | 0 | 0 | 0 | 0 | 42 | 4 |
| Wuhan Zall (loan) | 2020 | Chinese Super League | 14 | 3 | 3 | 1 | - | | 2 (Note: Appearance(s) in CSL Relegation play-offs) | 0 | 19 | 4 |
| Wuhan Yangtze River | 2022 | Chinese Super League | 29 | 1 | 0 | 0 | - | | - | | 29 | 1 |
| Wuhan Total | | | 43 | 4 | 3 | 1 | 0 | 0 | 2 | 0 | 48 | 5 |
| Shandong Taishan | 2023 | Chinese Super League | 4 | 3 | 3 | 0 | 3 | 0 | - | | 10 | 3 |
| Career total | | | 118 | 12 | 19 | 3 | 10 | 1 | 2 | 0 | 149 | 16 |

== Honours ==
=== Individual ===
- Chinese Football Association Young Player of the Year: 2017
