= 2019 Chinese FA Super Cup =

Shanghai SIPG	Beijing Sinobo Guoan
2	0
- Date: 23 February 2019
- Venue: Suzhou Olympic Sports Centre, Suzhou
- Man of the Match: Yan Junling
- Referee: Zhang Lei
- Attendance: 25,132
- Weather: Cloudy / 6°C / 87% humidity

2019 Chinese FA Super Cup (Chinese: 2019中国足球协会超级杯) was the 17th Chinese FA Super Cup, an annual football match contested by the winners of the previous season's Chinese Super League and FA Cup competitions. The match was played between Shanghai SIPG, champions of the 2018 Chinese Super League, and Beijing Sinobo Guoan, the winner of the 2018 Chinese FA Cup. Policy of foreign players and U-23 domestic players was executed in the tournament. At most three foreign players could play in the match while at least one domestic player who is under the age of 23 (born on or after 1 January 1996) must be in the starting eleven and at least three U-23 players must play in this match.

Shanghai SIPG won the title for the first time after a 2–0 win over Beijing Sinobo Guoan with goals from Wang Shenchao and Lü Wenjun. Beijing Sinobo Guoan's Hou Yongyong was substituted on in the 71st minute of the match as a U-23 domestic player, which made him the first naturalized player to appear for a Chinese club.

== Match ==
=== Details ===
23 February 2019
19:35

Shanghai SIPG	2–0	Beijing Sinobo Guoan
Wang Shenchao 62'; Lü Wenjun 66'	Report (Sina Sport); Report (Soccerway)

Suzhou Olympic Sports Centre, Suzhou
Attendance: 25,132
Referee: Zhang Lei (Dalian FA)

Shanghai	Beijing

GK	1	(China) Yan Junling
CB	28	(China) He Guan	(yellow card) 24'
CB	13	(China) Wei Zhen (U23)		(substituted off) 72'
CB	5	(China) Shi Ke
RM	23	(China) Fu Huan		(substituted off) 90'
CM	8	(Brazil) Oscar	(yellow card) 90+2'
CM	6	(China) Cai Huikang
LM	4	(China) Wang Shenchao
RF	10	(Brazil) Hulk (c)		(substituted off) 90+2'
CF	9	(Brazil) Elkeson
LF	11	(China) Lü Wenjun
Substitutes:
GK	34	(China) Chen Wei
DF	21	(China) Yu Hai		(substituted on) 72'
DF	36	(China) Yu Hao (U23)
MF	15	(China) Lin Chuangyi
MF	24	(China) Lei Wenjie (U23)		(substituted on) 90'
FW	14	(China) Li Shenglong
FW	33	(China) Huang Zhenfei (U23)		(substituted on) 90+2'
Manager:
(Portugal) Vítor Pereira

GK	25	(China) Guo Quanbo (U23)
RB	28	(China) Jiang Tao
CB	26	(China) Lü Peng
CB	19	(China) Yu Dabao (c)	(yellow card) 68'
LB	4	(China) Li Lei
CM	5	(Brazil) Renato Augusto
CM	6	(China) Chi Zhongguo		(substituted off) 71'
CM	8	(China) Piao Cheng
AM	23	(Spain) Jonathan Viera
AM	10	(China) Zhang Xizhe		(substituted off) 87'
CF	17	(Democratic Republic of the Congo) Cédric Bakambu
Substitutes:
GK	14	(China) Zou Dehai
DF	15	(China) Liu Huan
DF	18	(China) Jin Taiyan
DF	24	(China) Zhang Yu
MF	7	(China) Hou Yongyong (U23)		(substituted on) 71'
FW	20	(China) Wang Ziming (U23)		(substituted on) 87'
FW	29	(China) Ba Dun
Manager:
(Germany) Roger Schmidt

Man of the Match:
(China) Yan Junling (Shanghai SIPG)
Assistant referees:
Song Xiangyun (Dalian FA)
Shi Xiang (Jiangsu FA)
Fourth official:
Li Haixin (Guangzhou FA)
Video assistant referee:
Gu Chunhan (Wuhan FA)
Assistant video assistant referees:
Liang Songshang (Guangdong FA)

Match rules

- 90 minutes.
- 30 minutes of extra time if necessary.
- Penalty shoot-out if scores still level.
- Maximum of three substitutions, with a fourth allowed in extra time.
- Maximum of three foreign players on the pitch.
- At least one domestic U-23 player in the starting eleven.
- At least three domestic U-23 players appear.

Chinese FA Super Cup
2019 winners

First title

== See also ==
- 2018 Chinese Super League
- 2018 Chinese FA Cup
