= Yan Junling =

Chinese footballer (born 1991)

Yan Junling 颜骏凌
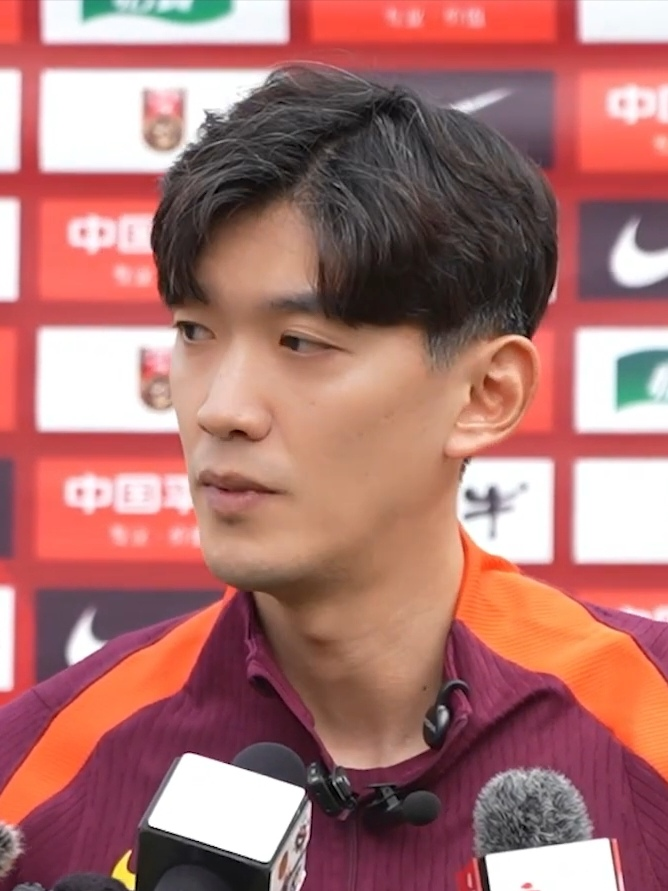
- Yan in 2026

Personal information
- Full name: Yan Junling
- Date of birth: 28 January 1991 (age 35)
- Place of birth: Shanghai, China
- Height: 1.91 m (6 ft 3 in)
- Position: Goalkeeper

Team information
- Current team: Shanghai Port
- Number: 1

Youth career
- 2001–2006: Genbao Football Academy

Senior career*
| Years | Team | Apps | (Gls) |
| 2007– | Shanghai Port | 442 | (0) |

International career^{‡}
| 2009–2010 | China U-19 | | |
| 2011–2012 | China U-23 | | |
| 2015– | China | 63 | (0) |
Medal record
Representing China
Men's football
EAFF Championship
| Runner-up | 2015 China | Team |
| Third place | 2017 Japan | Team |
| Third place | 2025 South Korea | Team |
- * Club domestic league appearances and goals as of 19 November 2026 ‡ National team caps and goals as of 31 March 2024

Yan Junling
- Simplified Chinese: 颜骏凌
- Traditional Chinese: 顏駿淩
Transcriptions
Standard Mandarin
- Hanyu Pinyin: Yán Jùnlíng
- IPA: [jɛ̌n tɕŷn lǐn]

Yan Junling (Chinese: 颜骏凌; pinyin: Yán Jùnlíng; born 28 January 1991) is a Chinese professional footballer who currently plays as a goalkeeper for Chinese Super League club Shanghai Port and the China national team.

== Club career ==
Yan Junling started his football career when he joined the Genbao Football Academy in 2001 and was promoted to Shanghai SIPG's (later to be renamed as Shanghai Port) first team during the 2007 season. He played as the backup goalkeeper for Gu Chao between 2007 and 2010. After Gu transferred to Hangzhou Greentown in early 2011, Yan became the first-choice goalkeeper for the club. Yan made 24 league appearances in the 2012 season as Shanghai won the second tier league title and was subsequently promoted to the top flight.

Yan would establish himself as a vital member of the team throughout the 2013 Chinese Super League campaign as the club finished in ninth while also gaining significant investment from Shanghai International Port. He would go on to be an integral member of the team that would come runners-up within the 2015 Chinese Super League and qualification for the AFC Champions League for the first time in the clubs history. He would go on to be a consistent presence within the team as he won the 2018 Chinese Super League title with the club.

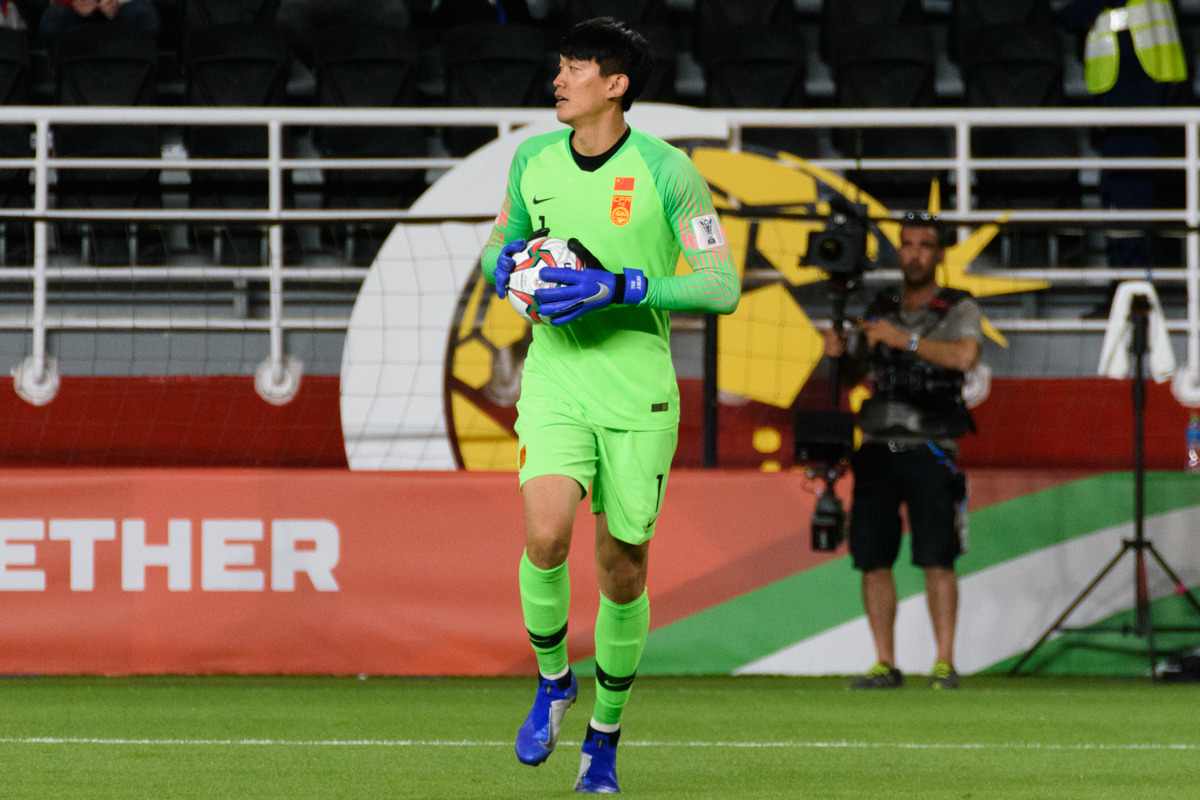
Yan with China in 2019

On 26 June 2019, Yan saved a penalty by Lee Dong-gook and helped the team win 5-3 in the penalty shootout against Jeonbuk Hyundai Motors in the round of 16 of the 2019 AFC Champions League.

On 29 October 2023, Yan won his second league title with Shanghai Port after a 1-1 home draw against direct competitor Shandong Taishan.

== International career ==
Yan made his debut for the Chinese national team on 13 December 2014 in a 4–0 win against Kyrgyzstan. However, this match was not recognised as an international "A" match by FIFA.

In January 2015, Yan was a member of China's squad for the 2015 AFC Asian Cup, where he served as back-up for first choice goalkeeper Wang Dalei. He made his official debut on 27 March 2015 in a 2–2 draw against Haiti, coming on as a substitute for Wang.

After China's failure to qualify for the 2018 FIFA World Cup, manager Marcello Lippi decided to let Yan replace Zeng Cheng as the national team's first choice goalkeeper for the next 4-year cycle. Yan played all five matches at the 2019 AFC Asian Cup in the United Arab Emirates as China reached the quarter-finals where they lost 3–0 to Iran.

Yan was named in China's squad for the 2023 AFC Asian Cup in Qatar and started the team's all 3 matches, he kept 2 clean sheets and conceded only one goal throughout the tournament but was not able to prevent the team's elimination after the group stage.

== Career statistics ==
=== Club statistics ===
As of 3 December 2024

Appearances and goals by club, season and competition
| Club | Season | League | | | National Cup | | Continental | | Other | | Total | |
| Club | Season | Division | Apps | Goals | Apps | Goals | Apps | Goals | Apps | Goals | Apps | Goals |
|---|---|---|---|---|---|---|---|---|---|---|---|---|
| Shanghai SIPG/ Shanghai Port | 2007 | China League Two | | | - | | - | | - | | | |
| Shanghai SIPG/ Shanghai Port | 2008 | China League One | 2 | 0 | - | | - | | - | | 2 | 0 |
| Shanghai SIPG/ Shanghai Port | 2009 | China League One | 6 | 0 | - | | - | | - | | 6 | 0 |
| Shanghai SIPG/ Shanghai Port | 2010 | China League One | 10 | 0 | - | | - | | - | | 10 | 0 |
| Shanghai SIPG/ Shanghai Port | 2011 | China League One | 18 | 0 | 0 | 0 | - | | - | | 18 | 0 |
| Shanghai SIPG/ Shanghai Port | 2012 | China League One | 24 | 0 | 0 | 0 | - | | - | | 24 | 0 |
| Shanghai SIPG/ Shanghai Port | 2013 | Chinese Super League | 23 | 0 | 0 | 0 | - | | - | | 23 | 0 |
| Shanghai SIPG/ Shanghai Port | 2014 | Chinese Super League | 30 | 0 | 0 | 0 | - | | - | | 30 | 0 |
| Shanghai SIPG/ Shanghai Port | 2015 | Chinese Super League | 30 | 0 | 2 | 0 | - | | - | | 32 | 0 |
| Shanghai SIPG/ Shanghai Port | 2016 | Chinese Super League | 30 | 0 | 2 | 0 | 10 | 0 | - | | 42 | 0 |
| Shanghai SIPG/ Shanghai Port | 2017 | Chinese Super League | 30 | 0 | 8 | 0 | 11 | 0 | - | | 49 | 0 |
| Shanghai SIPG/ Shanghai Port | 2018 | Chinese Super League | 29 | 0 | 4 | 0 | 8 | 0 | - | | 41 | 0 |
| Shanghai SIPG/ Shanghai Port | 2019 | Chinese Super League | 30 | 0 | 4 | 0 | 10 | 0 | 1 (Note: Appearances in Chinese FA Super Cup) | 0 | 45 | 0 |
| Shanghai SIPG/ Shanghai Port | 2020 | Chinese Super League | 14 | 0 | 1 | 0 | 1 | 0 | - | | 16 | 0 |
| Shanghai SIPG/ Shanghai Port | 2021 | Chinese Super League | 20 | 0 | 1 | 0 | 0 | 0 | - | | 21 | 0 |
| Shanghai SIPG/ Shanghai Port | 2022 | Chinese Super League | 30 | 0 | 4 | 0 | - | | - | | 34 | 0 |
| Shanghai SIPG/ Shanghai Port | 2023 | Chinese Super League | 29 | 0 | 2 | 0 | 1 | 0 | - | | 32 | 0 |
| Shanghai SIPG/ Shanghai Port | 2024 | Chinese Super League | 30 | 0 | 4 | 0 | 6 | 0 | 1 | 0 | 41 | 0 |
| Shanghai SIPG/ Shanghai Port | Total | | 385 | 0 | 32 | 0 | 47 | 0 | 2 | 0 | 466 | 0 |
| Career total | | | 385 | 0 | 32 | 0 | 47 | 0 | 2 | 0 | 466 | 0 |

=== International statistics ===
National team
| Year | Apps | Goals |
|---|---|---|
| 2015 | 2 | 0 |
| 2016 | 2 | 0 |
| 2017 | 3 | 0 |
| 2018 | 10 | 0 |
| 2019 | 12 | 0 |
| 2020 | 0 | 0 |
| 2021 | 10 | 0 |
| 2022 | 4 | 0 |
| 2023 | 10 | 0 |
| 2024 | 4 | 0 |
| 2025 | 3 | 0 |
| 2026 | 3 | 0 |
| Total | 63 | 0 |

== Honours ==
Shanghai Port

- Chinese Super League: 2018, 2023, 2024, 2025
- Chinese FA Cup: 2024
- China League One: 2012
- China League Two: 2007
- Chinese FA Super Cup: 2019

Individual

- Chinese Football Association Goalkeeper of the Year: 2017, 2018, 2019
- Chinese Super League Team of the Year: 2017, 2018, 2019
- Chinese FA Super Cup Most Valuable Player: 2019
