= Huang Zhenfei =

Chinese footballer

Huang Zhenfei 黄振飞
Personal information
- Full name: Huang Zhenfei
- Date of birth: 10 February 1999 (age 27)
- Place of birth: Wuhan, Hubei, China
- Height: 1.88 m (6 ft 2 in)
- Position: Midfielder

Team information
- Current team: Yanbian Longding
- Number: 30

Youth career
- 2010–2014: Shanghai Luckystar
- 2015–2018: Shanghai SIPG

Senior career*
Years	Team	Apps	(Gls)
2019–2020	Shanghai SIPG	0	(0)
2020	→ Inner Mongolia Zhongyou (loan)	10	(1)
2022–2024	Nanjing City	29	(1)
2025–	Yanbian Longding	25	(8)

International career^{‡}
2013	China U-17	1	(0)
- * Club domestic league appearances and goals as of 13 September 2024 ‡ National team caps and goals as of 15 August 2013

Huang Zhenfei (Chinese: 黄振飞; pinyin: Huáng Zhènfēi; born 10 February 1999) is a Chinese footballer who currently plays for Yanbian Longding.

== Club career ==
Huang joined Chinese Super League side Shanghai SIPG in 2015 and was promoted to the first team squad in 2019. On 23 February 2019, he made his senior debut in a 2–0 win over Beijing Sinobo Guoan in the 2019 Chinese FA Super Cup, coming on as a substitute for Hulk in the injury time. He would be sent to second tier football club Inner Mongolia Zhongyou on 29 July 2020 on loan. For Inner Mongolia Zhongyou he would make his debut for them on 13 September 2020 for Inner Mongolia Zhongyou in a league game against Beijing BSU in a 1-0 defeat.

== Career statistics ==
=== Club career ===
As of 31 December 2020.

Appearances and goals by club, season and competition
Club	Season	League			National Cup		Continental		Other		Total	
Club	Season	Division	Apps	Goals	Apps	Goals	Apps	Goals	Apps	Goals	Apps	Goals
Shanghai SIPG	2019	Chinese Super League	0	0	0	0	0	0	1 (Note: Appearances in Chinese FA Super Cup)	0	1	0
Shanghai SIPG	2020	Chinese Super League	0	0	1	0	0	0	–		1	0
Shanghai SIPG	Total		0	0	1	0	0	0	1	0	2	0
Inner Mongolia Zhongyou (loan)	2020	China League One	10	0	0	0	–		–		10	0
Career total			10	0	1	0	0	0	1	0	12	0

== Honours ==
=== Club ===
Shanghai SIPG

- Chinese FA Super Cup: 2019
