= Shi Ke =

Chinese footballer

Shi Ke 石柯
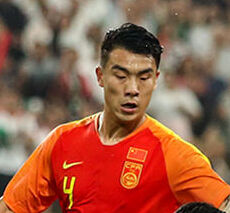
- Shi Ke in 2019

Personal information
- Full name: Shi Ke
- Date of birth: 8 January 1993 (age 33)
- Place of birth: Xinyi, Jiangsu, China
- Height: 1.84 m (6 ft 1/2 in)
- Position: Centre-back

Team information
- Current team: Yunnan Yukun
- Number: 5

Youth career
- 2006–2011: Hangzhou Greentown

Senior career*
Years	Team	Apps	(Gls)
2011	Wenzhou Provenza (loan)	12	(1)
2012–2014	Hangzhou Greentown	65	(1)
2015–2020	Shanghai SIPG	127	(0)
2021–2025	Shandong Taishan	109	(0)
2026–	Yunnan Yukun	16	(0)

International career^{‡}
2010–2012	China U-19	7	(0)
2013–2016	China U-23	21	(0)
2013–	China	9	(0)
Medal record
Representing China
Men's football
EAFF Championship
Silver medal – second place	2013 South Korea	Team
- * Club domestic league appearances and goals as of 19 November 2026 ‡ National team caps and goals as of 27 November 2019

Shi Ke (Chinese: 石柯; pinyin: Shí Kē; Mandarin pronunciation: [ʂɻ̩̌ kʰɤ́]; born 8 January 1993) is a Chinese footballer who currently plays as a centre-back for Yunnan Yukun in the Chinese Super League.

== Club career ==
Shi Ke started his football career in 2006 when he joined Hangzhou Greentown's youth academy from Wuxi Sports School. He was loaned out to China League Two club Wenzhou Provenza for the 2011 season. He scored his first goal for the club on 17 August 2011 in a 1–1 draw against Sichuan FC. Shi was promoted to the club's first team by then manager Takeshi Okada in 2012. He made his debut for the club on 25 March 2012 in a 1–0 win against Beijing Guoan. He soon became a regular for the club after Du Wei joined Shandong Luneng in July 2012.

On 24 January 2015, Shi transferred to fellow Chinese Super League side Shanghai SIPG. He made his debut for the club on 19 June 2015 in a 5–3 win against Changchun Yatai. He scored his first goal for the club on 28 February 2017 in a 5–1 win against Western Sydney Wanderers in the 2017 AFC Champions League. He would go on to establish himself as a vital member of the team and he would go on the win the club's first league title at the end of the 2018 Chinese Super League season.

After six seasons in Shanghai, Shi would join fellow top tier club Shandong Taishan on 20 February 2021. He made his debut for the club on 20 April 2021 in a league game against Chongqing Liangjiang Athletic that ended in a 2-0 victory. He would immediately establish himself as an integral member of the team's defence that went on to the win the 2021 Chinese Super League title and 2021 Chinese FA Cup. This would be followed up by him winning the 2022 Chinese FA Cup with them the next season.

== International career ==
Shi received his first call-up to the Chinese under-20 national team by then manager Su Maozhen in June 2010. He played once in the 2010 AFC U-19 Championship against Thailand in the group stage. Shi continued to play for the under-20 national team in the 2011 Toulon Tournament and was appointed as captain by then manager Jan Olde Riekerink. He made three appearances during 2012 AFC U-19 Championship qualification as the under-20 national team qualified for the 2012 AFC U-19 Championship.

Shi was called up to the Chinese under-23 national team in April 2012. He made his debut for the under-23 national team on 9 May 2012 in a 2–2 draw against Malawi. He was included in the squad for 2013 AFC U-22 Asian Cup qualification and made three appearances as China qualified for the 2013 AFC U-22 Championship.

Shi was first called up to the Chinese national team for the 2013 EAFF East Asian Cup. He made his debut on 28 July 2013 in a 4–3 win against Australia, coming on as a substitute for Yang Hao.

== Career statistics ==
=== Club statistics ===
As of match played 31 December 2025.

Appearances and goals by club, season and competition
Club	Season	League			National Cup		Continental		Other		Total	
Club	Season	Division	Apps	Goals	Apps	Goals	Apps	Goals	Apps	Goals	Apps	Goals
Wenzhou Provenza (loan)	2011	China League Two	12	1	-		-		-		12	1
Hangzhou Greentown	2012	Chinese Super League	19	0	2	0	-		-		21	0
Hangzhou Greentown	2013	Chinese Super League	23	0	1	0	-		-		24	0
Hangzhou Greentown	2014	Chinese Super League	23	1	1	0	-		-		24	1
Hangzhou Greentown	Total		65	1	4	0	0	0	0	0	69	1
Shanghai SIPG	2015	Chinese Super League	16	0	2	0	-		-		18	0
Shanghai SIPG	2016	Chinese Super League	27	0	1	0	10	0	-		38	0
Shanghai SIPG	2017	Chinese Super League	23	0	5	0	12	2	-		40	2
Shanghai SIPG	2018	Chinese Super League	28	0	4	0	9	0	-		41	0
Shanghai SIPG	2019	Chinese Super League	19	0	2	0	4	0	1 (Note: Appearances in Chinese FA Super Cup)	0	26	0
Shanghai SIPG	2020	Chinese Super League	14	0	1	0	1	0	-		16	0
Shanghai SIPG	Total		127	0	15	0	36	2	1	0	179	2
Shandong Taishan	2021	Chinese Super League	19	0	5	0	-		-		24	0
Shandong Taishan	2022	Chinese Super League	30	0	4	0	0	0	-		34	0
Shandong Taishan	2023	Chinese Super League	24	0	3	0	4	0	1	0	32	0
Shandong Taishan	2024	Chinese Super League	19	0	2	0	6	0	-		27	0
Shandong Taishan	2025	Chinese Super League	17	0	1	0	1	0	-		19	0
Shandong Taishan	Total		109	0	15	0	11	0	1	0	136	0
Career total			313	2	34	0	47	2	2	0	396	4

=== International statistics ===
National team
Year	Apps	Goals
2013	1	0
2014	0	0
2015	0	0
2016	0	0
2017	0	0
2018	3	0
2019	5	0
Total	9	0

== Honours ==
=== Club ===
Shanghai SIPG

- Chinese Super League: 2018
- Chinese FA Super Cup: 2019

Shandong Taishan

- Chinese Super League: 2021
- Chinese FA Cup: 2021, 2022
