= Nie Meng =

Chinese association football player

Personal information
- Date of birth: 7 February 1998 (age 28)
- Height: 1.74 m (5 ft 9 in)
- Position: Defender

Team information
- Current team: Dandong Tengyue

Youth career
- –2020: Shanghai Port

Senior career*
| Years | Team | Apps | (Gls) |
| 2020–2021 | Shanghai Port | 0 | (0) |
| 2022- | Dandong Tengyue | 0 | (0) |

International career
- China U21
- * Club domestic league appearances and goals as of 14:01, 27 April 2022 (UTC)

Nie Meng (Chinese: 聂孟; born 7 February 1998) is a Chinese footballer currently playing as a left-back for Dandong Tengyue.

== Career statistics ==
=== Club ===
As of 9 July 2021.

| Club | Season | League | | | Cup | | Continental | | Other | | Total | |
| Club | Season | Division | Apps | Goals | Apps | Goals | Apps | Goals | Apps | Goals | Apps | Goals |
|---|---|---|---|---|---|---|---|---|---|---|---|---|
| Shanghai Port | 2020 | Chinese Super League | 0 | 0 | 1 (Note: Appearances in the Chinese FA Cup) | 0 | 0 | 0 | 0 | 0 | 1 | 0 |
| Shanghai Port | 2021 | Chinese Super League | 0 | 0 | 0 | 0 | 1 (Note: Appearances in AFC Champions League qualification) | 0 | 0 | 0 | 1 | 0 |
| Career total | | | 0 | 0 | 1 | 0 | 1 | 0 | 0 | 0 | 2 | 0 |
