= Zhang Wei (footballer, born March 1993) =

Chinese footballer

Zhang Wei 张卫
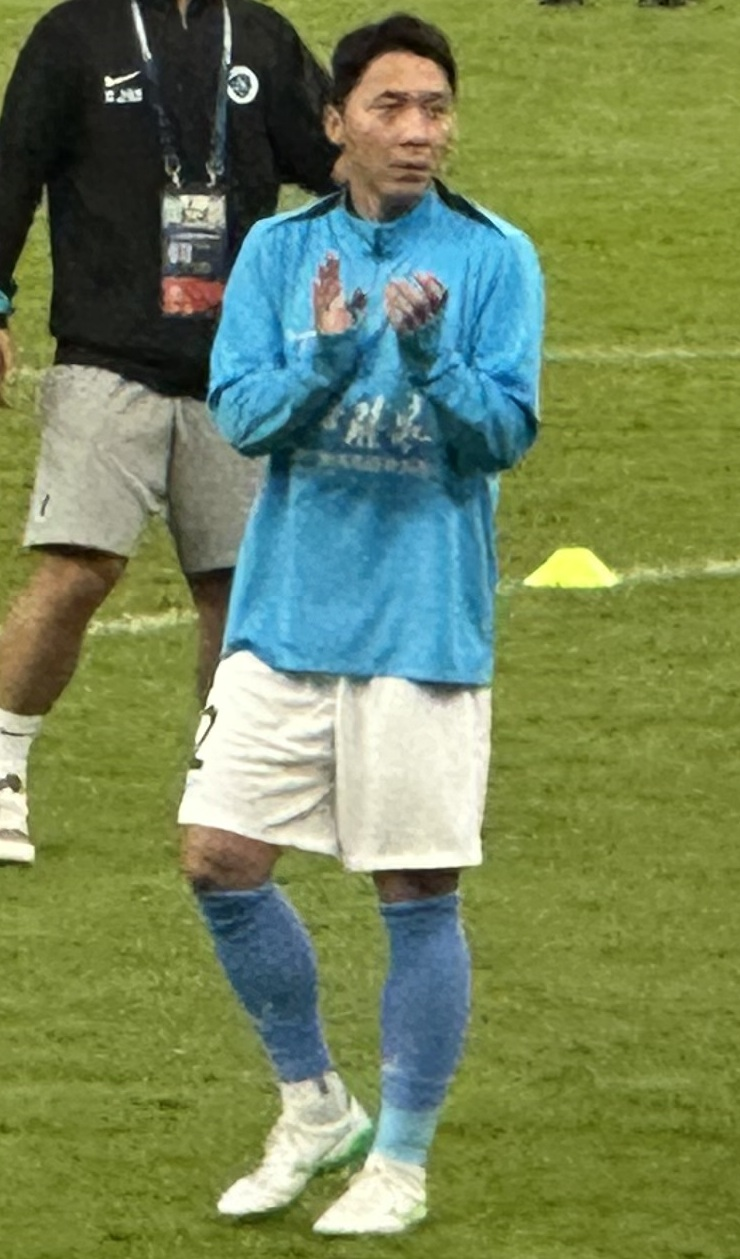
- Zhang Wei in April 2025

Personal information
- Date of birth: 28 March 1993 (age 33)
- Place of birth: Yucheng, Henan, China
- Height: 1.76 m (5 ft 9 1/2 in)
- Position: Full-back

Team information
- Current team: Shanghai Port B (on loan from Qingdao Hainiu)
- Number: 2

Youth career
- 2009: Beijing Guoan
- 2009–2012: Shanghai Dongya

Senior career*
| Years | Team | Apps | (Gls) |
| 2011–2012 | → Shanghai Zobon (loan) | ? | (?) |
| 2013–2023 | Shanghai Port | 74 | (2) |
| 2022 | → Tianjin Jinmen Tiger (loan) | 7 | (0) |
| 2023 | → Qingdao Hainiu (loan) | 25 | (3) |
| 2024–2025 | Shenzhen Peng City | 47 | (1) |
| 2026– | Qingdao Hainiu | 1 | (0) |
| 2026– | → Shanghai Port B (loan) | 0 | (0) |
- * Club domestic league appearances and goals as of 28 August 2025

Zhang Wei (Chinese: 张卫; born 28 March 1993 in Yucheng) is a Chinese football player who plays for China League Two club Shanghai Port B, on loan from Qingdao Hainiu.

== Club career ==
Zhang started his professional football career in 2011 when he was loaned to Shanghai Zobon's squad from Shanghai Dongya for the 2011 China League Two campaign. He returned to Shanghai Dongya at the start of the new 2013 Chinese Super League season, with the club having recently been promoted to the top tier. He made his league debut for Shanghai on 4 May 2014 in a 2–2 away draw against Guangzhou R&F, coming on as a substitute for Wu Lei in the 90th minute. On 26 April 2017, he scored his first senior goal in a 2017 AFC Champions League match against FC Seoul, which ensured Shanghai's 4–2 home victory.

On 9 July 2026, Zhang returned to Shanghai Port by loan and played for B team in China League Two.

== Career statistics ==
Statistics accurate as of match played 17 November 2022.

Appearances and goals by club, season and competition
| Club | Season | League | | | National Cup | | Continental | | Other | | Total | |
| Club | Season | Division | Apps | Goals | Apps | Goals | Apps | Goals | Apps | Goals | Apps | Goals |
|---|---|---|---|---|---|---|---|---|---|---|---|---|
| Shanghai Zobon (loan) | 2011 | China League Two | | | - | | - | | - | | | |
| Shanghai Zobon (loan) | 2012 | China League Two | | | - | | - | | - | | | |
| Shanghai Zobon (loan) | Total | | 0 | 0 | 0 | 0 | 0 | 0 | 0 | 0 | 0 | 0 |
| Shanghai SIPG | 2013 | Chinese Super League | 0 | 0 | 0 | 0 | - | | - | | 0 | 0 |
| Shanghai SIPG | 2014 | Chinese Super League | 8 | 0 | 1 | 0 | - | | - | | 9 | 0 |
| Shanghai SIPG | 2015 | Chinese Super League | 7 | 0 | 1 | 0 | - | | - | | 8 | 0 |
| Shanghai SIPG | 2016 | Chinese Super League | 5 | 0 | 1 | 0 | 3 | 0 | - | | 9 | 0 |
| Shanghai SIPG | 2017 | Chinese Super League | 16 | 0 | 3 | 0 | 9 | 1 | - | | 28 | 1 |
| Shanghai SIPG | 2018 | Chinese Super League | 11 | 0 | 1 | 0 | 1 | 0 | - | | 13 | 0 |
| Shanghai SIPG | 2019 | Chinese Super League | 19 | 2 | 2 | 0 | 8 | 0 | 0 (Note: Appearances in Chinese FA Super Cup) | 0 | 29 | 2 |
| Shanghai SIPG | 2020 | Chinese Super League | 6 | 0 | 1 | 0 | 0 | 0 | - | | 7 | 0 |
| Shanghai SIPG | 2021 | Chinese Super League | 2 | 0 | 2 | 0 | 0 | 0 | - | | 4 | 0 |
| Shanghai SIPG | Total | | 74 | 2 | 12 | 0 | 21 | 1 | 0 | 0 | 107 | 2 |
| Tianjin Jinmen Tiger (loan) | 2022 | Chinese Super League | 7 | 0 | 1 | 0 | - | | - | | 8 | 0 |
| Career total | | | 81 | 2 | 13 | 0 | 21 | 1 | 0 | 0 | 115 | 2 |

== Honours ==
=== Club ===
Shanghai SIPG

- Chinese Super League: 2018
