= Yu Hai =

Chinese footballer (born 1987)

Yu Hai 于海
Personal information
- Full name: Yu Hai
- Date of birth: 4 June 1987 (age 39)
- Place of birth: Luoyang, Henan, China
- Height: 1.83 m (6 ft 0 in)
- Positions: Left winger; left-back

Team information
- Current team: Shanghai Port B (assistant coach)

Senior career*
Years	Team	Apps	(Gls)
2004–2006	Xi'an Chanba	36	(0)
2007–2008	Vitesse	10	(0)
2009–2014	Guizhou Renhe	160	(19)
2015–2023	Shanghai Port	157	(6)
Total		363	(25)

International career
2009–2018	China	71	(11)

Managerial career
- 2024–: Shanghai Port B (assistant)
Medal record
Representing China
Men's football
EAFF Championship
Gold medal – first place	2010 Japan	Team
Silver medal – second place	2015 China	Team
- * Club domestic league appearances and goals

Yu Hai (Chinese: 于海; pinyin: Yú Hǎi; Mandarin pronunciation: [y̌ xàɪ]; born 4 June 1987) is a Chinese former professional footballer.

== Club career ==
=== Shaanxi Chanba ===
Yu Hai started his football career with Shaanxi Chanba in the 2004 season and he made his debut for the club on 16 May 2004 in a 2–2 draw against Qingdao Etsong. Despite predominantly playing as a substitute throughout the season, he played a significant part in Shaanxi's third-place finish at the end of the season. By the following 2005 season, he established as a player with rising potential within the team and was starting in considerably more games within the team.

=== Vitesse ===
Before the start of the 2006–07 season, Yu transferred to Eredivisie side, Vitesse where he would make his debut for the club on 18 March 2007 in a 2–0 loss against FC Utrecht. His time at Vitesse proved unsuccessful as he was unable to establish himself within the team. He was released from Vitesse after the 2008 Summer Olympics due to cruciate ligament damage which he suffered in July 2008.

=== Return to Shaanxi Chanba ===
Yu returned to Shaanxi at the start of the 2009 season where he played 29 league games and scored three goals by the end of the season. For the next few seasons, he became a regular for the club; and by the start of the 2012 season, Yu followed the club when it decided to move to Guizhou and rename themselves Guizhou Renhe.

On 1 December 2013, Yu scored twice in a 2-0 home win against Guangzhou Evergrande in the first leg of 2013 Chinese FA Cup final. He scored again in the second leg which ended as a 2-1 away defeat, scoring all 3 goals in a 3-2 aggregated win which saw Renhe win their first major trophy in club history, and prevented Evergrande from winning an unprecedented Treble in Chinese football history, as they had already won the 2013 Chinese Super League and 2013 AFC Champions League before the FA Cup final.

=== Shanghai Port ===
On 27 February 2015, Yu transferred to fellow Chinese Super League side Shanghai SIPG (later to be renamed as Shanghai Port). He made his debut in a league game and scored his first goal for the club on 7 March 2015 in a 2–1 win against Jiangsu Sainty. By the 2018 Chinese Super League season the Head coach, Vítor Pereira would convert Yu into a left-back, which saw Shanghai SIPG win their first league title. He won his second Chinese Super League title with Shanghai Port in the 2023 season.

On 5 January 2024, Yu announced his retirement from professional football.

== International career ==
Yu was a member of the Chinese under-23 national team and was expected to lead the team in the 2008 Summer Olympics; however, he was dropped from the team due to cruciate ligament damage. He eventually graduated to the senior team when he returned to the Chinese Super League and gained regular playing time with Shaanxi Chanba. He made his international debut on 4 June 2009 in a 4–1 loss against Saudi Arabia. Despite the defeat, Yu would go on to establish himself as a regular and be included in the squad that won the 2010 East Asian Football Championship. This would then lead to a call-up for the squad that took part in the 2011 AFC Asian Cup.

On 24 December 2014, Yu was named in China's squad for the 2015 AFC Asian Cup. In the team's opening group match, he scored the winning goal, a deflected free kick as China won 1–0 against Saudi Arabia.

== Career statistics ==
=== Club statistics ===
Appearances and goals by club, season and competition
Club	Season	League			National Cup		League Cup		Continental		Other		Total	
Club	Season	Division	Apps	Goals	Apps	Goals	Apps	Goals	Apps	Goals	Apps	Goals	Apps	Goals
Xi'an Chanba	2004	Chinese Super League	21	0	1	0	2	0	-		-		24	0
Xi'an Chanba	2005	Chinese Super League	15	0	3	2	2	0	-		-		20	2
Xi'an Chanba	2006	Chinese Super League	0	0	0	0	-		-		-		0	0
Xi'an Chanba	Total		36	0	4	2	4	0	0	0	0	0	44	2
Vitesse	2006-07	Eredivisie	2	0	0	0	-		-		-		2	0
Vitesse	2007-08	Eredivisie	8	0	0	0	-		-		-		8	0
Vitesse	Total		10	0	0	0	0	0	0	0	0	0	10	0
Guizhou Renhe	2009	Chinese Super League	29	3	-		-		-		-		29	3
Guizhou Renhe	2010	Chinese Super League	29	4	-		-		-		-		29	4
Guizhou Renhe	2011	Chinese Super League	28	3	3	1	-		-		-		31	4
Guizhou Renhe	2012	Chinese Super League	21	3	5	1	-		-		-		26	4
Guizhou Renhe	2013	Chinese Super League	25	3	5	3	-		6	0	-		36	6
Guizhou Renhe	2014	Chinese Super League	28	3	1	0	-		5	0	0 (Note: Appearances in Chinese FA Super Cup)	0	34	3
Guizhou Renhe	Total		160	19	14	5	0	0	11	0	0	0	185	24
Shanghai Port	2015	Chinese Super League	19	3	1	0	-		-		-		20	3
Shanghai Port	2016	Chinese Super League	29	1	2	0	-		10	1	-		41	2
Shanghai Port	2017	Chinese Super League	20	1	6	0	-		8	0	-		34	1
Shanghai Port	2018	Chinese Super League	22	1	3	1	-		8	1	-		33	3
Shanghai Port	2019	Chinese Super League	26	0	3	0	-		9	1	1	0	39	1
Shanghai Port	2020	Chinese Super League	11	0	1	1	-		6	0	-		18	1
Shanghai Port	2021	Chinese Super League	14	0	7	0	-		0	0	-		21	0
Shanghai Port	2022	Chinese Super League	11	0	2	0	-		-		-		13	0
Shanghai Port	2023	Chinese Super League	5	0	1	0	-		-		-		6	0
Shanghai Port	Total		157	6	26	2	0	0	41	3	1	0	225	10
Career total			363	25	44	9	4	0	52	3	1	0	464	37

=== International statistics ===
National team
Year	Apps	Goals
2009	7	3
2010	12	3
2011	13	3
2012	4	0
2013	6	0
2014	7	0
2015	9	1
2016	7	1
2017	0	0
2018	6	0
Total	71	11

=== International goals ===
Scores and results list China's goal tally first.

#	Date	Venue	Opponent	Score	Result	Competition
1.	25 July 2009	Olympic Center Stadium, Tianjin, China	Kyrgyzstan	3–0	3–0	Friendly
2.	30 September 2009	Hohhot City Stadium, Hohhot, China	Botswana	4–0	4–1	Friendly
3.	14 November 2009	Beirut Municipal Stadium, Beirut, Lebanon	Lebanon	1–0	2–0	2011 AFC Asian Cup qualification
4.	10 February 2010	Tokyo Stadium, Tokyo, Japan	South Korea	1–0	3–0	2010 EAFF Championship
5.	11 August 2010	Guangxi Sports Center, Nanning, China	Bahrain	1–0	1–1	Friendly
6.	18 December 2010	Zhuhai Sports Center, Zhuhai, China	Estonia	2–0	3–0	Friendly
7.	16 January 2011	Thani bin Jassim Stadium, Doha, Qatar	Uzbekistan	1–0	2–2	2011 AFC Asian Cup
8.	2 September 2011	Tuodong Stadium, Kunming, China	Singapore	2–1	2–1	2014 FIFA World Cup qualification
9.	15 November 2011	Jalan Besar Stadium, Kallang, Singapore	Singapore	1–0	4–0	2014 FIFA World Cup qualification
10.	10 January 2015	Lang Park, Brisbane, Australia	Saudi Arabia	1–0	1–0	2015 AFC Asian Cup
11.	1 September 2016	Seoul World Cup Stadium, Seoul, South Korea	South Korea	1–3	2–3	2018 FIFA World Cup qualification

== Honours ==
Guizhou Renhe

- Chinese FA Cup: 2013
- Chinese FA Super Cup: 2014

Shanghai Port

- Chinese Super League: 2018, 2023
- Chinese FA Super Cup: 2019

China

- East Asian Football Championship: 2010
