= Wei Zhen (footballer) =

Chinese footballer

Wei Zhen 魏震
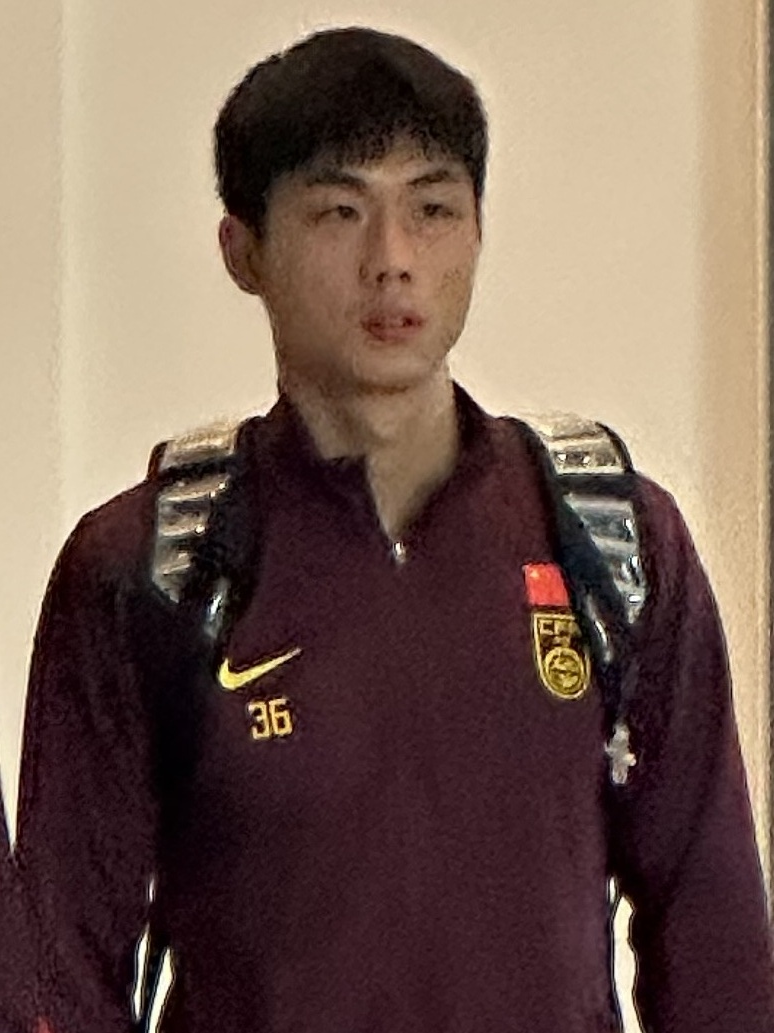
- Wei Zhen in June 2025

Personal information
- Full name: Wei Zhen
- Date of birth: 12 February 1997 (age 29)
- Place of birth: Lu'an, Anhui, China
- Height: 1.88 m (6 ft 2 in)
- Position: Defender

Team information
- Current team: Shanghai Port
- Number: 13

Youth career
- Shanghai Luckystar
- 2014–2016: Shanghai SIPG

Senior career*
Years	Team	Apps	(Gls)
2016–	Shanghai Port	171	(6)

International career^{‡}
2015–2017	China U19	17	(1)
2017–2020	China U23	3	(0)
2023–	China	11	(0)
Medal record
Representing China
Men's football
EAFF Championship
Bronze medal – third place	2025 South Korea	Team
- * Club domestic league appearances and goals as of 29 November 2026 ‡ National team caps and goals as of 10 June 2023

Wei Zhen (Chinese: 魏震; pinyin: Wèi Zhèn; born 12 February 1997) is a Chinese professional footballer who currently plays for Chinese Super League club Shanghai Port and the China national team.

== Club career ==
Wei Zhen joined Chinese Super League side Shanghai SIPG's (later renamed as Shanghai Port) youth academy in November 2014 when Shanghai SIPG bought Shanghai Luckystar' youth team. He was promoted to the first team squad in the middle of 2016 season. Wei made his senior debut on 3 August 2017, playing the whole match in a 4–0 home win against Tianjin Quanjian in the second leg of 2017 Chinese FA Cup fifth round. He made his league debut three days later in a 0–0 home draw against Tianjin Quanjian, also playing full 90 minutes and was selected as player of the match. He would make 13 appearances for the club throughout the 2017 season.

As a promising young player he would attract the interests of fellow top-tier club Tianjin Quanjian, who would make an official approach for him in February 2018, however his parent club refused Wei's transfer request after they believed that he was being illegally poached and incentivized to join Tianjin Quanjian. Wei applied to the CFA for arbitration on 16 April 2018. While his arbitration was being heard he would not play for Shanghai throughout the whole of the 2018 season. On 18 January 2019, he made a public apology to the club. He would immediately be welcomed back into the team and won the 2019 Chinese FA Super Cup in his first match back. After the game he would establish himself as an integral member of the team and go on to score his first goal for the club on 15 August 2021, in a league game against Tianjin Jinmen Tiger in a 5–0 victory.

== International career ==
On 23 March 2023, Wei made his international debut in a 0–0 away draw against New Zealand.

== Personal life ==
Wei Zhen is the paternal cousin of fellow footballer Wei Lai.

== Career statistics ==
As of 1 March 2026.

Appearances and goals by club, season and competition
Club	Season	League			National Cup		Continental		Other		Total	
Club	Season	Division	Apps	Goals	Apps	Goals	Apps	Goals	Apps	Goals	Apps	Goals
Shanghai SIPG/ Shanghai Port	2016	Chinese Super League	0	0	0	0	0	0	-		0	0
Shanghai SIPG/ Shanghai Port	2017	Chinese Super League	8	0	3	0	2	0	-		13	0
Shanghai SIPG/ Shanghai Port	2018	Chinese Super League	0	0	0	0	0	0	-		0	0
Shanghai SIPG/ Shanghai Port	2019	Chinese Super League	19	0	3	0	7	0	1 (Note: Appearances in Chinese FA Super Cup)	0	30	0
Shanghai SIPG/ Shanghai Port	2020	Chinese Super League	16	0	1	0	6	0	-		23	0
Shanghai SIPG/ Shanghai Port	2021	Chinese Super League	19	1	6	0	0	0	-		25	1
Shanghai SIPG/ Shanghai Port	2022	Chinese Super League	22	0	2	0	-		-		24	0
Shanghai SIPG/ Shanghai Port	2023	Chinese Super League	19	1	2	0	0	0	-		21	1
Shanghai SIPG/ Shanghai Port	2024	Chinese Super League	20	0	2	0	7	0	0	0	29	0
Shanghai SIPG/ Shanghai Port	2025	Chinese Super League	20	0	0	0	7	0	0	0	27	0
Shanghai SIPG/ Shanghai Port	Total		143	2	19	0	29	0	1	0	192	2
Career total			143	2	19	0	29	0	1	0	192	2

== Honours ==
Shanghai Port

- Chinese Super League: 2023, 2024, 2025
- Chinese FA Cup: 2024
- Chinese FA Super Cup: 2019
