= Fu Huan =

Chinese footballer (born 1993)

Fu Huan 傅欢
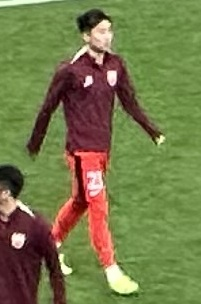
- Fu Huan in May 2025

Personal information
- Date of birth: 12 July 1993 (age 33)
- Place of birth: Shanghai, China
- Height: 1.82 m (5 ft 11 1/2 in)
- Position: Right-back

Team information
- Current team: Shanghai Port
- Number: 23

Youth career
- 2005–2010: Genbao Football Academy

Senior career*
| Years | Team | Apps | (Gls) |
| 2011– | Shanghai Port | 158 | (2) |
| 2022 | → Kunshan FC (loan) | 14 | (0) |
| 2023 | → Nanjing City (loan) | 29 | (0) |

International career^{‡}
| | China U23 | 9 | (0) |
| 2017– | China | 5 | (0) |
Medal record
Representing China
Men's football
EAFF Championship
| Bronze medal – third place | 2017 Japan | Team |
- * Club domestic league appearances and goals as of 19 November 2026 ‡ National team caps and goals as of 25 March 2019

Fu Huan
- Simplified Chinese: 傅欢
- Traditional Chinese: 傅歡
Transcriptions
Standard Mandarin
- Hanyu Pinyin: Fù Huān
- IPA: [fû xwán]

Fu Huan (Chinese: 傅欢; pinyin: Fù Huān; born 12 July 1993 in Shanghai) is a Chinese football player who currently plays for Chinese Super League side Shanghai Port as a right-back.

== Club career ==
Born in Shanghai, Fu joined Genbao Football Academy in July 2005. He was promoted to academy's first team Shanghai East Asia squad in 2011. On 15 October 2011, he made his senior debut in a 0–0 league draw against Beijing Institute of Technology, coming on as a substitute for Zhan Yilin in the 58th minute. On 2 June 2012, Fu scored his first goal for Shanghai East Asia in the second round of 2012 Chinese FA Cup which Shanghai beat Fujian Smart Hero 6–0. He made 6 league appearances in the 2012 season, as Shanghai East Asia won the champions and promotion to the top flight. Fu scored his first Super League goal on 19 August 2016 in a 4–1 home victory against Shijiazhuang Ever Bright. He would go on to establish himself as a tough tackling confrontational player, which saw him sent off during a league match with Guangzhou R&F when he was involved in a collision with Li Tixiang on 18 June 2017. He would receive a ban of 6 matches by the Chinese Football Association for his subsequent abrasive behaviour. On his return his combative behaviour would go on to help the club win the 2018 Chinese Super League title.

With the introduction of Ivan Leko as Head coach, Fu would see his playing time significantly reduce after he preferred using Wang Shenchao as right-back, which saw him go on loan to second tier club Kunshan on 27 August 2022. He would make his first appearance for the club on 29 August 2022 against Qingdao Youth Island in a 1-0 victory. He would go on to establish himself as regular within the team that won the division and promotion to the top tier at the end of the 2022 China League One campaign.

== International career ==
On 10 November 2017, Fu made his debut for the Chinese national team in a 2–0 loss against Serbia.

== Career statistics ==
=== Club statistics ===
Statistics accurate as of match played 1 March 2026.

Appearances and goals by club, season and competition
| Club | Season | League | | | National Cup | | Continental | | Other | | Total | |
| Club | Season | Division | Apps | Goals | Apps | Goals | Apps | Goals | Apps | Goals | Apps | Goals |
|---|---|---|---|---|---|---|---|---|---|---|---|---|
| Shanghai SIPG | 2011 | China League One | 1 | 0 | 0 | 0 | - | | - | | 1 | 0 |
| Shanghai SIPG | 2012 | China League One | 6 | 0 | 2 | 1 | - | | - | | 8 | 1 |
| Shanghai SIPG | 2013 | Chinese Super League | 8 | 0 | 2 | 0 | - | | - | | 10 | 0 |
| Shanghai SIPG | 2014 | Chinese Super League | 22 | 0 | 0 | 0 | - | | - | | 22 | 0 |
| Shanghai SIPG | 2015 | Chinese Super League | 6 | 0 | 1 | 0 | - | | - | | 7 | 0 |
| Shanghai SIPG | 2016 | Chinese Super League | 20 | 1 | 2 | 0 | 8 | 0 | - | | 30 | 1 |
| Shanghai SIPG | 2017 | Chinese Super League | 19 | 1 | 7 | 0 | 11 | 0 | - | | 37 | 1 |
| Shanghai SIPG | 2018 | Chinese Super League | 12 | 0 | 2 | 0 | 4 | 0 | - | | 18 | 0 |
| Shanghai SIPG | 2019 | Chinese Super League | 11 | 0 | 1 | 1 | 7 | 0 | 1 (Note: Appearances in Chinese FA Super Cup) | 0 | 20 | 1 |
| Shanghai SIPG | 2020 | Chinese Super League | 17 | 0 | 0 | 0 | 6 | 0 | - | | 23 | 0 |
| Shanghai SIPG | 2021 | Chinese Super League | 1 | 0 | 3 | 0 | 1 | 0 | - | | 5 | 0 |
| Shanghai SIPG | 2022 | Chinese Super League | 3 | 0 | 0 | 0 | 0 | 0 | - | | 3 | 0 |
| Shanghai SIPG | 2024 | Chinese Super League | 12 | 0 | 3 | 0 | 6 | 0 | 0 | 0 | 21 | 0 |
| Shanghai SIPG | 2025 | Chinese Super League | 10 | 0 | 0 | 0 | 5 | 0 | 0 | 0 | 15 | 0 |
| Shanghai SIPG | Total | | 148 | 2 | 23 | 2 | 48 | 0 | 1 | 0 | 181 | 4 |
| Kunshan FC (loan) | 2022 | China League One | 14 | 0 | 0 | 0 | - | | - | | 14 | 0 |
| Nanjing City (loan) | 2023 | China League One | 29 | 0 | 0 | 0 | - | | - | | 29 | 0 |
| Career total | | | 191 | 2 | 23 | 2 | 48 | 0 | 1 | 0 | 263 | 4 |

=== International statistics ===
National team
| Year | Apps | Goals |
|---|---|---|
| 2017 | 4 | 0 |
| 2018 | 0 | 0 |
| 2019 | 1 | 0 |
| Total | 5 | 0 |

== Honours ==
=== Club ===
Shanghai Port

- Chinese Super League: 2018, 2024, 2025
- Chinese FA Cup: 2024
- China League One: 2012
- Chinese FA Super Cup: 2019

Kunshan FC

- China League One: 2022
