= Yang Shiyuan =

Chinese footballer

Yang Shiyuan 양세원 杨世元
Personal information
- Date of birth: 11 March 1994 (age 32)
- Place of birth: Anshan, Liaoning, China
- Height: 1.73 m (5 ft 8 in)
- Position: Midfielder

Team information
- Current team: Shanghai Port
- Number: 20

Youth career
- Shanghai SIPG

Senior career*
Years	Team	Apps	(Gls)
2011–2012	Shanghai Zobon	?	(?)
2014–	Shanghai Port	86	(2)
2017	→ Yanbian Funde (loan)	0	(0)
2018	→ Suzhou Dongwu (loan)	13	(0)
- * Club domestic league appearances and goals as of 19 November 2026

Yang Shiyuan
- Simplified Chinese: 杨世元
Transcriptions
Standard Mandarin
- Hanyu Pinyin: Yáng Shìyuán
- IPA: [jǎŋ.ʂɻ̩̂ ɥɛ̌n]

Chinese Korean name
- Chosŏn'gŭl: 양세원
Transcriptions
- Revised Romanization: Yang Sewon
- McCune–Reischauer: Yang Sewŏn

Yang Shiyuan (Chinese: 杨世元; Korean: 양세원; born 11 March 1994 in Anshan) is a Chinese football player of Korean descent who currently plays for Chinese Super League side Shanghai Port.

== Club career ==
Yang started his professional football career in 2011 with the Shanghai Zobon's squad for the 2011 China League Two campaign. He joined Chinese Super League side Shanghai SIPG (later renamed to Shanghai Port) in 2014. He made his Super League debut on 22 March 2014 in a game against Hangzhou Greentown, coming on as a substitute for Zhu Zhengrong in the 79th minute. He was sent off in his second appearance in a Shanghai Derby match against Shanghai Greenland Shenhua for a high tackle on Giovanni Moreno. He received a ban of 2 matches and was fined ¥10,000 on 30 April 2014.

On 28 February 2017, Yang was loaned to fellow Super League side Yanbian Funde until 31 December 2017. He would failed to establish himself in the first team and was downgraded to reserve squad in June 2017. The following season would see him loaned out again, this time to third tier club Suzhou Dongwu where he made his league debut on 31 March 2018 against Hunan Billows in a 2-1 defeat. After gaining regular playing time, he would return to his parent club.

== Career statistics ==
Statistics accurate as of match played 31 January 2024.

Appearances and goals by club, season and competition
Club	Season	League			National Cup		Continental		Other		Total	
Club	Season	Division	Apps	Goals	Apps	Goals	Apps	Goals	Apps	Goals	Apps	Goals
Shanghai Zobon	2011	China League Two			-		-		-			
Shanghai Zobon	2012	China League Two			0	0	-		-			
Shanghai Zobon	Total				0	0	0	0	0	0		
Shanghai SIPG/ Shanghai Port	2014	Chinese Super League	2	0	1	0	-		-		3	0
Shanghai SIPG/ Shanghai Port	2015	Chinese Super League	2	0	1	0	-		-		3	0
Shanghai SIPG/ Shanghai Port	2016	Chinese Super League	2	0	0	0	1	0	-		3	0
Shanghai SIPG/ Shanghai Port	2019	Chinese Super League	11	0	2	2	5	0	0 (Note: Appearances in Chinese FA Super Cup)	0	18	2
Shanghai SIPG/ Shanghai Port	2020	Chinese Super League	12	1	0	0	7	0	-		19	1
Shanghai SIPG/ Shanghai Port	2021	Chinese Super League	14	1	5	1	0	0	-		19	2
Shanghai SIPG/ Shanghai Port	2022	Chinese Super League	9	0	0	0	-		-		9	0
Shanghai SIPG/ Shanghai Port	2023	Chinese Super League	13	0	1	0	1	0	-		15	0
Shanghai SIPG/ Shanghai Port	Total		65	2	10	3	14	0	0	0	89	5
Yanbian Funde (loan)	2017	Chinese Super League	0	0	0	0	-		-		0	0
Suzhou Dongwu (loan)	2018	China League Two	13	0	3	0	-		-		16	0
Career total			78	2	13	3	14	0	0	0	105	5

== Honours ==
Shanghai Port

- Chinese Super League: 2023, 2024, 2025
- Chinese FA Cup: 2024
