= He Guan =

Chinese footballer (born 1993)

He Guan 贺惯
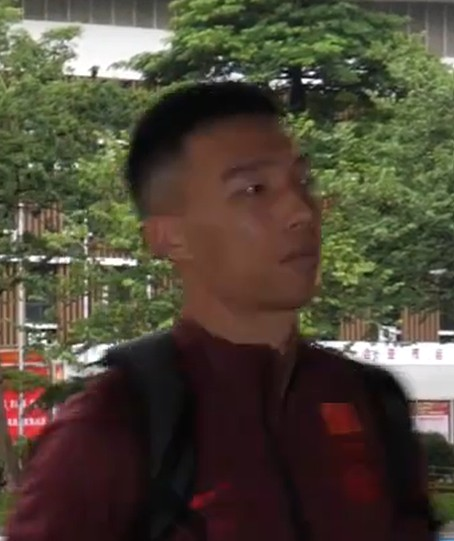
- He Guan in September 2019

Personal information
- Date of birth: 25 January 1993 (age 33)
- Place of birth: Tai'an, Shandong, China
- Height: 1.81 m (5 ft 11 1/2 in)
- Position: Defender

Team information
- Current team: Wuhan Three Towns
- Number: 2

Youth career
- Shandong Luneng
- Shanghai SIPG

Senior career*
Years	Team	Apps	(Gls)
2011–2012	Shanghai Zobon	?	(?)
2014–2025	Shanghai Port	145	(4)
2022	→ Changchun Yatai (loan)	15	(1)
2023	→ Wuhan Three Towns (loan)	7	(0)
2024	→ Henan FC (loan)	14	(1)
2025	→ Wuhan Three Towns (loan)	23	(0)
2026–	Wuhan Three Towns	27	(1)

International career^{‡}
2012	China U19		
2013–2014	China U22		
2017–	China	6	(0)
Medal record
Representing China
Men's football
EAFF Championship
Bronze medal – third place	2017 Japan	Team
- * Club domestic league appearances and goals as of 22 November 2026 ‡ National team caps and goals as of 11 June 2019

He Guan
- Simplified Chinese: 贺惯
- Traditional Chinese: 賀慣
Transcriptions
Standard Mandarin
- Hanyu Pinyin: Hè Guàn
- IPA: [xɤ̂ kwân]

He Guan (Chinese: 贺惯; pinyin: Hè Guàn; born 25 January 1993) is a Chinese professional footballer who plays as a centre-back for Chinese Super League club Wuhan Three Towns.

== Club career ==
He started his professional football career in 2011 when he was loaned to Shanghai Zobon's squad for the 2011 China League Two campaign. He returned to Shanghai Dongya in 2013 and was promoted to first team squad in 2014. He made his senior debut on 16 July 2014 in the fourth round of 2014 Chinese FA Cup against Wuhan Hongxing. On 7 March 2015, He made his Chinese Super League debut in the season's opening game in a 2–1 win against Jiangsu Guoxin-Sainty. On 18 September 2016, He scored his first Chinese Super League goal in a 2–1 away victory against Hangzhou Greentown.

On 1 September 2022, He joined Chinese Super League club Changchun Yatai on loan. He made his Yatai debut on the same day in a 1–0 defeat against Chengdu Rongcheng at home.

On 6 January 2026, He announced his departure after playing 10 years for Shanghai Port. On 21 January 2026, He transferred to Wuhan Three Towns.

== International career ==
On 14 November 2017, He made his debut for the Chinese national team in a 4-0 international friendly defeat against Colombia.

== Career statistics ==
=== Club statistics ===
Statistics accurate as of match played 31 December 2024.

Appearances and goals by club, season and competition
Club	Season	League			National Cup		Continental		Other		Total	
Club	Season	Division	Apps	Goals	Apps	Goals	Apps	Goals	Apps	Goals	Apps	Goals
Shanghai Zobon	2011	China League Two			-		-		-			
Shanghai Zobon	2012	China League Two			0	0	-		-			
Shanghai Zobon	Total				0	0	0	0	0	0		
Shanghai SIPG/ Shanghai Port	2014	Chinese Super League	0	0	1	0	-		-		1	0
Shanghai SIPG/ Shanghai Port	2015	Chinese Super League	7	0	1	1	-		-		8	1
Shanghai SIPG/ Shanghai Port	2016	Chinese Super League	8	1	1	0	3	0	-		12	1
Shanghai SIPG/ Shanghai Port	2017	Chinese Super League	29	2	8	1	10	0	-		47	3
Shanghai SIPG/ Shanghai Port	2018	Chinese Super League	28	1	4	0	8	0	-		40	1
Shanghai SIPG/ Shanghai Port	2019	Chinese Super League	28	0	4	0	9	0	1 (Note: Appearances in Chinese FA Super Cup)	0	42	0
Shanghai SIPG/ Shanghai Port	2020	Chinese Super League	17	0	1	0	7	0	-		25	0
Shanghai SIPG/ Shanghai Port	2021	Chinese Super League	19	0	5	1	0	0	-		24	1
Shanghai SIPG/ Shanghai Port	2022	Chinese Super League	4	0	0	0	0	0	-		4	0
Shanghai SIPG/ Shanghai Port	2023	Chinese Super League	5	0	1	0	-		-		6	0
Shanghai SIPG/ Shanghai Port	2024	Chinese Super League	0	0	-		-		0	0	0	0
Shanghai SIPG/ Shanghai Port	Total		145	4	26	3	37	0	1	0	209	7
Changchun Yatai (loan)	2022	Chinese Super League	15	1	0	0	-		-		15	1
Wuhan Three Towns (loan)	2023	Chinese Super League	7	0	-		4	0	-		11	0
Henan FC (loan)	2024	Chinese Super League	14	1	2	0	-		-		16	1
Career total			181	6	28	3	41	0	1	0	251	9

=== International statistics ===
National team
Year	Apps	Goals
2017	3	0
2018	2	0
2019	1	0
Total	6	0

== Honours ==
=== Club ===
Shanghai SIPG

- Chinese Super League: 2018
- Chinese FA Super Cup: 2019
