= Li Shenglong =

Chinese footballer (born 1992)

Li Shenglong 李圣龙
Personal information
- Date of birth: 30 July 1992 (age 34)
- Place of birth: Shanghai, China
- Height: 1.80 m (5 ft 11 in)
- Position: Forward

Team information
- Current team: Shanghai Port B
- Number: 14

Youth career
- Shanghai Dongya

Senior career*
| Years | Team | Apps | (Gls) |
| 2011–2012 | Shanghai Zobon | ? | (?) |
| 2013– | Shanghai Port | 138 | (16) |
| 2026– | → Shanghai Port B (res.) | 0 | (0) |
- * Club domestic league appearances and goals as of 31 October 2025

Li Shenglong (Chinese: 李圣龙; born 30 July 1992 in Shanghai) is a Chinese football player who currently plays for China League Two side Shanghai Port B.

== Club career ==
Li started his professional football career in 2011 when he was loaned to Shanghai Zobon's squad for the 2011 China League Two campaign. He joined Chinese Super League's newcomer Shanghai SIPG (later renamed as Shanghai Port) in 2013. He made his Super League debut for Shanghai on 20 September 2013 in a game against Shandong Luneng, coming on as a substitute for Zhu Zhengrong in the 83rd minute. Li was demoted to the reserve squad in the 2016 season. On 8 August 2016, he received a ban of six months by Chinese Football Association for age falsification which he changed his age from 30 July 1992 to 27 January 1993. Li returned to first team in the 2017 season. On 9 July 2017, he scored his first goal for the club in a 4–2 away defeat against Changchun Yatai.

On 8 January 2026, Li was loaned to B team and competed China League Two for the 2026 season.

== Personal life ==
Li Shenglong is the son of former Shanghai Shenhua midfielder Li Longhai.

== Career statistics ==
Statistics accurate as of match played 9 December 2025.

Appearances and goals by club, season and competition
| Club | Season | League | | | National Cup | | Continental | | Other | | Total | |
| Club | Season | Division | Apps | Goals | Apps | Goals | Apps | Goals | Apps | Goals | Apps | Goals |
|---|---|---|---|---|---|---|---|---|---|---|---|---|
| Shanghai Zobon | 2011 | China League Two | | | - | | - | | - | | | |
| Shanghai Zobon | 2012 | China League Two | | | 0 | 0 | - | | - | | | |
| Shanghai Zobon | Total | | | | 0 | 0 | 0 | 0 | 0 | 0 | | |
| Shanghai SIPG/ Shanghai Port | 2013 | Chinese Super League | 2 | 0 | 0 | 0 | - | | - | | 2 | 0 |
| Shanghai SIPG/ Shanghai Port | 2014 | Chinese Super League | 7 | 0 | 1 | 0 | - | | - | | 8 | 0 |
| Shanghai SIPG/ Shanghai Port | 2015 | Chinese Super League | 0 | 0 | 0 | 0 | - | | - | | 0 | 0 |
| Shanghai SIPG/ Shanghai Port | 2017 | Chinese Super League | 6 | 2 | 4 | 0 | 2 | 0 | - | | 12 | 2 |
| Shanghai SIPG/ Shanghai Port | 2018 | Chinese Super League | 11 | 0 | 1 | 0 | 2 | 0 | - | | 14 | 0 |
| Shanghai SIPG/ Shanghai Port | 2019 | Chinese Super League | 29 | 7 | 4 | 1 | 7 | 1 | 0 (Note: Appearances in Chinese FA Super Cup) | 0 | 40 | 9 |
| Shanghai SIPG/ Shanghai Port | 2020 | Chinese Super League | 17 | 0 | 1 | 1 | 8 | 3 | - | | 26 | 4 |
| Shanghai SIPG/ Shanghai Port | 2021 | Chinese Super League | 21 | 2 | 6 | 0 | 0 | 0 | - | | 27 | 2 |
| Shanghai SIPG/ Shanghai Port | 2022 | Chinese Super League | 15 | 1 | 1 | 0 | - | | - | | 16 | 1 |
| Shanghai SIPG/ Shanghai Port | 2023 | Chinese Super League | 11 | 3 | 1 | 1 | 0 | 0 | - | | 12 | 4 |
| Shanghai SIPG/ Shanghai Port | 2024 | Chinese Super League | 6 | 0 | 2 | 1 | 0 | 0 | 0 | 0 | 8 | 1 |
| Shanghai SIPG/ Shanghai Port | 2025 | Chinese Super League | 13 | 1 | 2 | 1 | 4 | 0 | 0 | 0 | 19 | 2 |
| Shanghai SIPG/ Shanghai Port | Total | | 138 | 16 | 23 | 5 | 23 | 4 | 0 | 0 | 186 | 25 |
| Career total | | | 138 | 16 | 23 | 5 | 23 | 4 | 0 | 0 | 186 | 25 |

== Honours ==
Shanghai Port

- Chinese Super League: 2018, 2023, 2024, 2025
- Chinese FA Cup: 2024
- Chinese FA Super Cup: 2019
