= Wang Shenchao =

Chinese footballer (born 1989)

Wang Shenchao 王燊超
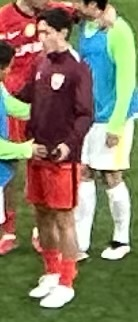
- Wang in 2025

Personal information
- Date of birth: 8 February 1989 (age 37)
- Place of birth: Shanghai, China
- Height: 1.80 m (5 ft 11 in)
- Position: Defender

Team information
- Current team: Shanghai Port
- Number: 4

Youth career
- 2000–2005: Genbao Football Academy

Senior career*
Years	Team	Apps	(Gls)
2006–	Shanghai Port	458	(28)

International career^{‡}
2017–	China	21	(0)
Medal record
Representing China
Men's football
EAFF Championship
Bronze medal – third place	2019 South Korea	Team
- * Club domestic league appearances and goals as of 19 November 2026 ‡ National team caps and goals as of 26 November 2023

Wang Shenchao
- Chinese: 王燊超
Transcriptions
Standard Mandarin
- Hanyu Pinyin: Wáng Shēnchāo
- IPA: [wǎŋ ʂə́n ʈʂʰáʊ]

Wang Shenchao (Chinese: 王燊超; pinyin: Wáng Shēnchāo; born 8 February 1989) is a Chinese footballer who plays as a defender for Shanghai Port in the Chinese Super League and the China national team.

== Club career ==
Wang Shenchao started his football career when he joined the Genbao Football Academy in 2000 and was promoted to Shanghai SIPG's (later to be renamed as Shanghai Port) first team for the 2006 season. He became a regular for the club as Shanghai won promotion to the second tier in the 2007 season. He became the club's captain after Wang Jiayu transferred to Nanchang Hengyuan in January 2011. Wang was linked with a move to Shanghai Shenxin after the 2011 season but decided to stay at the club. He appeared in 29 league matches and scored three goals in the 2012 season as Shanghai clinched the second tier league title and was subsequently promoted to the top flight.

Wang would establish himself as a vital member of the team throughout the 2013 Chinese Super League campaign as the club finished in ninth while also gaining significant investment from Shanghai International Port. He would go on to be an integral member of the team that would come runners-up within the 2015 Chinese Super League and qualification for the AFC Champions League for the first time in the clubs history. He would go on to be a consistent presence within the team as he won the 2018 Chinese Super League title with the club.

== International career ==
Wang made his debut for the Chinese national team on 7 June 2017 in an 8-1 win against the Philippines. On 26 May 2018, he was caught on camera taking out a necklace from his sock and wearing it during an international friendly against Myanmar. On 12 June 2018, he received a one-year ban from the national team.

== Career statistics ==
=== Club ===
As of 31 January 2023

Appearances and goals by club, season and competition
Club	Season	League			National cup		Continental		Other		Total	
Club	Season	Division	Apps	Goals	Apps	Goals	Apps	Goals	Apps	Goals	Apps	Goals
Shanghai SIPG/ Shanghai Port	2006	China League Two			–		–		–			
Shanghai SIPG/ Shanghai Port	2007	China League Two			–		–		–			
Shanghai SIPG/ Shanghai Port	2008	China League One	24	0	–		–		–		24	0
Shanghai SIPG/ Shanghai Port	2009	China League One	24	2	–		–		–		24	2
Shanghai SIPG/ Shanghai Port	2010	China League One	24	0	–		–		–		24	0
Shanghai SIPG/ Shanghai Port	2011	China League One	25	2	2	1	–		–		27	3
Shanghai SIPG/ Shanghai Port	2012	China League One	29	3	1	0	–		–		30	3
Shanghai SIPG/ Shanghai Port	2013	Chinese Super League	29	0	1	0	–		–		30	0
Shanghai SIPG/ Shanghai Port	2014	Chinese Super League	30	2	0	0	–		–		30	2
Shanghai SIPG/ Shanghai Port	2015	Chinese Super League	28	0	2	0	–		–		30	0
Shanghai SIPG/ Shanghai Port	2016	Chinese Super League	24	1	1	0	9	0	–		34	1
Shanghai SIPG/ Shanghai Port	2017	Chinese Super League	29	1	8	0	11	1	–		48	2
Shanghai SIPG/ Shanghai Port	2018	Chinese Super League	25	2	3	0	8	0	–		36	2
Shanghai SIPG/ Shanghai Port	2019	Chinese Super League	25	1	3	0	9	3	1 (Note: Appearances in Chinese FA Super Cup)	1	38	5
Shanghai SIPG/ Shanghai Port	2020	Chinese Super League	19	3	0	0	6	0	–		25	3
Shanghai SIPG/ Shanghai Port	2021	Chinese Super League	20	1	1	0	0	0	–		21	1
Shanghai SIPG/ Shanghai Port	2022	Chinese Super League	31	2	2	2	–		–		33	4
Shanghai SIPG/ Shanghai Port	Total		386	20	24	3	43	4	1	1	454	28
Career total			386	20	24	3	43	4	1	1	454	28

=== International ===
Appearances and goals by national team and year
National team	Year	Apps	Goals
China	2017	4	0
China	2018	3	0
China	2019	1	0
China	2020	0	0
China	2021	9	0
China	2022	2	0
China	2023	2	0
Total		21	0

== Honours ==
Shanghai Port

- Chinese Super League: 2018, 2023, 2024, 2025
- Chinese FA Cup: 2024
- China League One: 2012
- China League Two: 2007
- Chinese FA Super Cup: 2019

Individual

- Chinese Super League Team of the Year: 2017
