= Lü Wenjun =

Chinese footballer (born 1989)

Lü Wenjun 吕文君
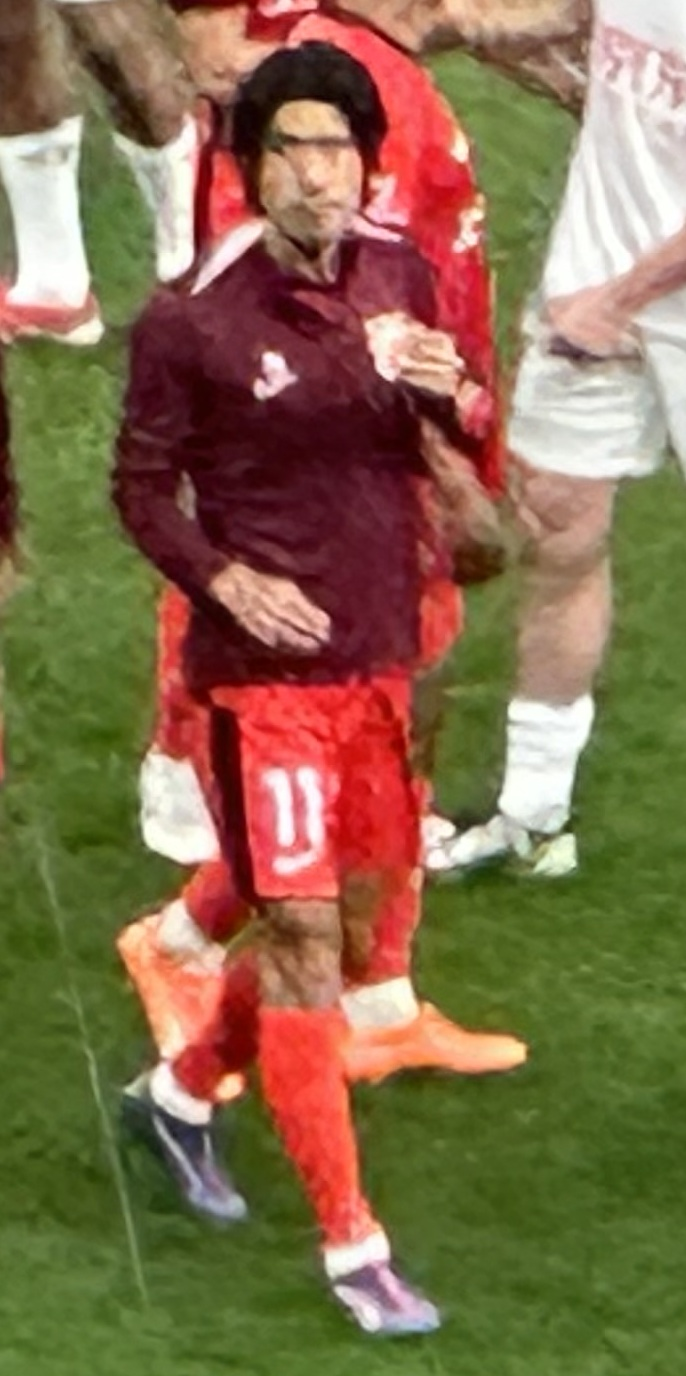
- Lü Wenjun in May 2025

Personal information
- Full name: Lü Wenjun
- Date of birth: 11 March 1989 (age 37)
- Place of birth: Shanghai, China
- Height: 1.85 m (6 ft 1 in)
- Positions: Left winger; left wing-back

Youth career
- 2000–2005: Genbao Football Academy

Senior career*
Years	Team	Apps	(Gls)
2006–2025	Shanghai Port	398	(76)

International career^{‡}
2007–2008	China U19		
2010–2011	China U23		
- * Club domestic league appearances and goals as of 25 August 2025 ‡ National team caps and goals as of 27 November 2019

Lü Wenjun (simplified Chinese: 吕文君; traditional Chinese: 呂文君; pinyin: Lǚ Wénjūn; born 11 March 1989) is a Chinese former professional footballer who played as a winger or left wing-back.

== Club career ==
Lü Wenjun started his football career when he joined the Genbao Football Academy in 2000 and was promoted to Shanghai SIPG's (later to be renamed as Shanghai Port) first team during the 2006 season. He became a regular for the club as Shanghai won promotion to the second tier in the 2007 season. He was linked with a move to top tier side Tianjin Teda at the end of the 2011 season but decided to stay at the club. Lü scored six goals in 29 appearances in the 2012 season as Shanghai clinched the second tier league title and was subsequently promoted to the top flight.

He would establish himself as a vital member of the team throughout the 2013 Chinese Super League campaign as the club finished in ninth while also gaining significant investment from Shanghai International Port. He would go on to be an integral member of the team that would come runners-up within the 2015 Chinese Super League and qualification for the AFC Champions League for the first time in the clubs history. He would go on to be a consistent presence within the team due to his versatility as he won the 2018 Chinese Super League title with the club.

On 24 June 2023, Lü scored his 100th goal for the club in a 3-1 away win against Guangzhou FC in the third round of 2023 Chinese FA Cup, becoming the second player to reach this milestone after Wu Lei.

After winning the league title in 2025, Lü retired from professional football and joined Genbao Football Academy as youth team coach.

== Career statistics ==
As of 31 January 2023.

Appearances and goals by club, season and competition
Club	Season	League			National Cup		Continental		Other		Total	
Club	Season	Division	Apps	Goals	Apps	Goals	Apps	Goals	Apps	Goals	Apps	Goals
Shanghai Port	2006	China League Two			-		-		-			
Shanghai Port	2007	China League Two			-		-		-			
Shanghai Port	2008	China League One	22	4	-		-		-		22	4
Shanghai Port	2009	China League One	22	6	-		-		-		22	6
Shanghai Port	2010	China League One	15	3	-		-		-		15	3
Shanghai Port	2011	China League One	25	6	2	1	-		-		27	7
Shanghai Port	2012	China League One	29	6	0	0	-		-		29	6
Shanghai Port	2013	Chinese Super League	17	5	1	0	-		-		18	5
Shanghai Port	2014	Chinese Super League	22	2	0	0	-		-		22	2
Shanghai Port	2015	Chinese Super League	25	3	3	0	-		-		28	3
Shanghai Port	2016	Chinese Super League	26	3	2	0	10	1	-		38	4
Shanghai Port	2017	Chinese Super League	25	5	7	1	11	0	-		43	6
Shanghai Port	2018	Chinese Super League	27	7	4	0	8	0	-		39	7
Shanghai Port	2019	Chinese Super League	17	4	3	1	6	1	1 (Note: Appearances in Chinese FA Super Cup)	1	27	7
Shanghai Port	2020	Chinese Super League	20	0	1	0	7	1	-		28	1
Shanghai Port	2021	Chinese Super League	22	7	7	3	0	0	-		30	10
Shanghai Port	2022	Chinese Super League	31	8	3	2	-		-		34	10
Shanghai Port	Total		345	69	33	8	42	3	1	1	422	81
Career total			345	69	34	8	42	3	1	1	422	81

== Honours ==
Shanghai Port

- Chinese Super League: 2018, 2023, 2024, 2025
- Chinese FA Cup: 2024
- China League One: 2012
- China League Two: 2007
- Chinese FA Super Cup: 2019
