= Zhang Lei (referee) =

Chinese football referee (born 1982)

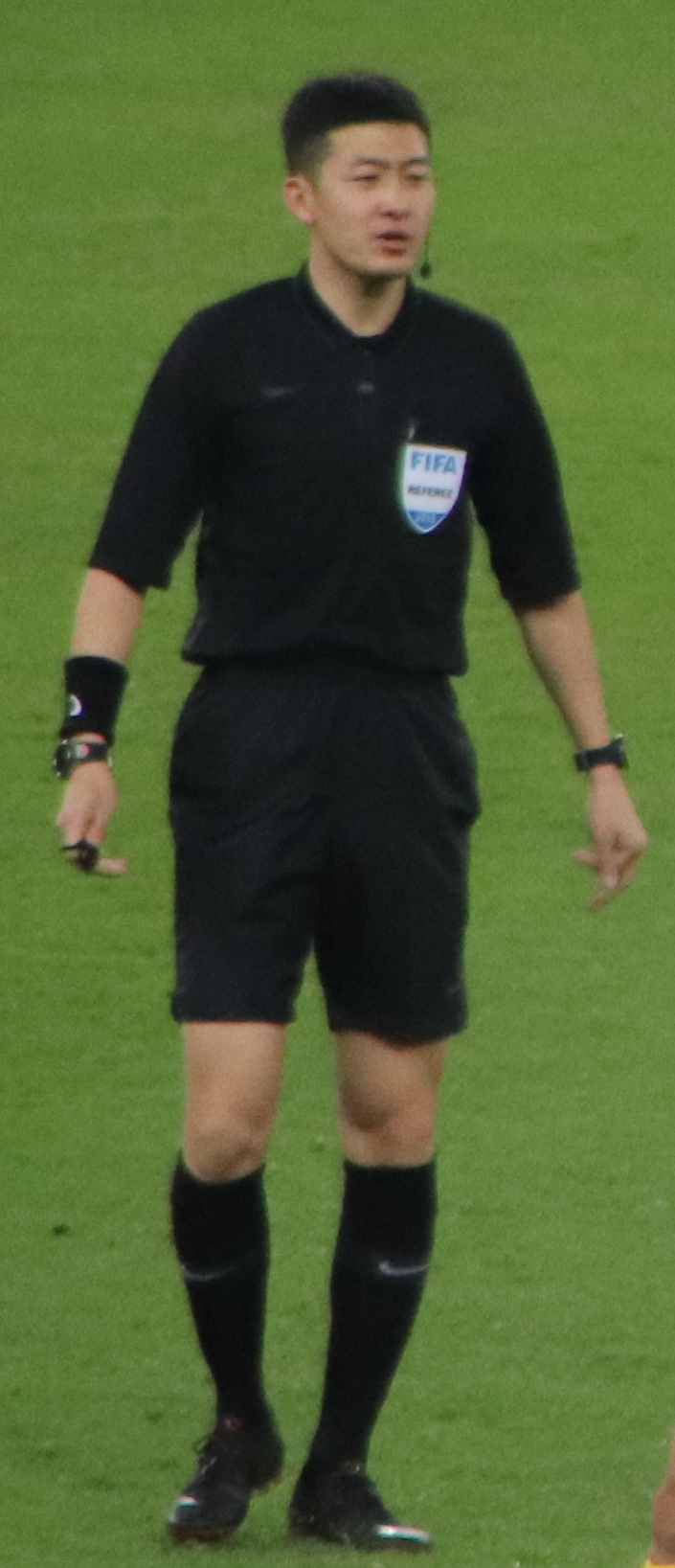
- Born: 1982 (age 43–44); Dalian, Liaoning, China

Domestic
Years	League	Role
2010–2011; 2014–	Chinese Super League	Referee

International
Years	League	Role
2011; 2017–	FIFA listed	Referee

Zhang Lei
- Simplified Chinese: 张雷
- Traditional Chinese: 張雷
Transcriptions
Standard Mandarin
- Hanyu Pinyin: Zhāng Léi
- IPA: [ʈʂáŋlěɪ]

Zhang Lei (Chinese: 张雷; pinyin: Zhāng Léi; Mandarin pronunciation: [ʈʂáŋlěɪ]; born 1982) is a Chinese football referee. He is a full international referee for FIFA.

On 23 February 2019, it was announced that Zhang Lei had been hired by CFA to become one of the professional referees in China.
