= Shanghai International Port Group =

Chinese government owned port operator

Shanghai International Port (Group) Co., Ltd.
- Type: Public; state-owned
- Traded as: SSE: 600018; SSE MidCap Component
- Industry: Port operations and management
- Founded: 2003
- Headquarters: Shanghai, China
- Area served: China
- Key people: Gu Jinshan (chairman)
- Revenue: 0 renminbi (2018)
- Owner: Shanghai Government (61.07%)

Chinese name
- Simplified Chinese: 上海国际港务（集团）股份有限公司
- Traditional Chinese: 上海國際港務（集團）股份有限公司
- Hanyu Pinyin: Shànghǎi Guójì Gǎngwù (Jítuán) Gǔfèn Yǒuxiàn Gōngsī
Transcriptions
Standard Mandarin
- Hanyu Pinyin: Shànghǎi Guójì Gǎngwù (Jítuán) Gǔfèn Yǒuxiàn Gōngsī

short name
- Simplified Chinese: 上港集团
- Traditional Chinese: 上港集團
- Hanyu Pinyin: Shànggǎng Jítuán
- Literal meaning: shang[hai]-port group
Transcriptions
Standard Mandarin
- Hanyu Pinyin: Shànggǎng Jítuán
- Website: www.portshanghai.com.cn

Shanghai International Port (Group) Co., Ltd. (SIPG) is the exclusive operator of all the public terminals in the Port of Shanghai. It is a majority state-owned company and a component of SSE 180 Index as well as CSI 300 Index and sub-index CSI 100 Index.

Its headquarters are located in SIPG Cruise City, Hongkou District, Shanghai, but the registered address is located in the Shanghai Free-Trade Zone, Pudong District, Shanghai.

== Overseas operations ==
In 2015, SIPG won the bid for the concession to operate the port of Haifa's new Bay Terminal in Israel for 25 years starting in 2021.

== Football ==
The company owns and operates the professional football club Shanghai Port. In 2018, they became the Chinese national champions by winning the 2018 edition of the Chinese Super League.

== Equity investments ==
Shanghai International Port is one of the major shareholders of the Bank of Shanghai.

SIPG is also a cornerstone investor of the Postal Savings Bank of China (PSBC) on the eve of PSBC's H share IPO. As of 31 December 2019, SIPG still owned PSBC's A and H ordinary shares directly or indirectly: 16.87% of all H ordinary shares of the bank, or equivalent to 3.89% of all classes of the ordinary shares, as well as 0.17% of A ordinary shares, or equivalent to 0.13% of all classes of the ordinary shares.

SIPG also partnered with COSCO Shipping to acquire the stake of OOIL, the parent company of OOCL.
