= 2019 Beijing Renhe F.C. season =

Beijing Renhe
2019 season
- Manager: Aleksandar Stanojević; Luis García; Wang Bo
- Stadium: Beijing Fengtai Stadium
- Super League: 16th
- FA Cup: Last 16

The 2019 Beijing Renhe F.C. season is Beijing Renhe's 2nd consecutive season in the Chinese Super League ever since it started back in the 2004 season and 2nd consecutive season in the top flight of Chinese football. This season Beijing Renhe participates in the Chinese Super League and Chinese FA Cup.

== Transfers ==
=== Winter ===
In: Note: Flags indicate national team as defined under FIFA eligibility rules; some limited exceptions apply. Players may hold more than one non-FIFA nationality.

No.	Pos.	Nation	Player
2	DF	CHN	Du Wenyang (from Hebei China Fortune)
6	MF	CHN	Zhang Wenzhao (loan from Guangzhou Evergrande Taobao)
10	MF	NGR	Sone Aluko (loan from (England) Reading)
19	GK	CHN	Liu Peng (from Qingdao Huanghai)
23	GK	CHN	Mou Pengfei (from Heilongjiang Lava Spring)
37	FW	CHN	Yang Yihu (loan return from Heilongjiang Lava Spring)
-	MF	CHN	Chen Liming (loan return from Heilongjiang Lava Spring)
-	DF	CHN	Xu Jiajun (loan return from Yanbian Beiguo)
-	FW	CHN	Fan Bojian (loan return from Heilongjiang Lava Spring)

Out: Note: Flags indicate national team as defined under FIFA eligibility rules; some limited exceptions apply. Players may hold more than one non-FIFA nationality.

No.	Pos.	Nation	Player
1	GK	CHN	Xu Jiamin (loan to Heilongjiang Lava Spring)
2	DF	CHN	Yu Bin (to Qingdao Huanghai)
6	DF	CHN	Wang Qiang (Retired)
9	FW	CHN	Han Peng (Retired)
19	MF	CHN	Chen Liming (loan to Heilongjiang Lava Spring)
22	FW	CHN	Wang Gang (to Beijing Sinobo Guoan)
23	DF	CHN	Liu Yang (to Tianjin TEDA)
33	MF	CHN	Wang Chu (loan return to (Portugal) Cova da Piedade)
38	FW	CMR	Benjamin Moukandjo (loan return to Jiangsu Suning)
41	DF	CHN	Ma Yangyang (to Shaanxi Chang'an Athletic)
42	DF	CHN	Liu Xiangwei (loan to Heilongjiang Lava Spring)
44	GK	CHN	Ci Henglong (to Heilongjiang Lava Spring)
55	MF	CHN	Cui Yijie (Released)
56	GK	CHN	Sheng Peng (to Inner Mongolia Zhongyou)
57	MF	CHN	Li Shisen (Released)
-	GK	CHN	Qian Wenlong (to Heilongjiang Lava Spring)
-	DF	CHN	Guo Hongwei (to Heilongjiang Lava Spring)
-	MF	CHN	Chen Zhichao (to Heilongjiang Lava Spring)
-	DF	CHN	Xu Jiajun (to Taizhou Yuanda)
-	FW	CHN	Fan Bojian (to Heilongjiang Lava Spring)

== Squad ==
As of 1 March 2019 Note: Flags indicate national team as defined under FIFA eligibility rules; some limited exceptions apply. Players may hold more than one non-FIFA nationality.

No.	Pos.	Nation	Player
1	GK	CHN	Li Chen
2	DF	CHN	Du Wenyang
3	MF	CHN	Liu Boyang
4	DF	CHN	Luo Xin
5	DF	CHN	Wan Houliang
6	MF	CHN	Zhang Wenzhao (on loan from Guangzhou Evergrande)
7	FW	KEN	Ayub Masika
8	MF	ARG	Augusto Fernández
9	FW	SEN	Makhete Diop
10	FW	NGR	Sone Aluko (on loan from Reading)
11	MF	CHN	Zhu Baojie
12	GK	CHN	Zhang Lie
13	FW	CHN	Shi Liang
14	MF	CHN	Wang Xuanhong
15	MF	CHN	Chen Jie

No.	Pos.	Nation	Player
16	MF	CHN	Xiang Hantian
17	DF	CHN	Liu Jian
18	MF	CHN	Sun Weizhe
19	GK	CHN	Liu Peng
20	MF	CHN	Cao Yongjing
21	FW	CHN	Jin Hui
23	GK	CHN	Mou Pengfei
25	MF	CHN	Liu Xinyu
26	MF	CHN	Zhang Yufeng
28	MF	CHN	Li Chenglong
29	MF	CHN	Nizamdin Ependi
30	MF	CHN	Feng Renliang
31	MF	CHN	Rao Weihui
35	FW	CHN	Lin Jinghao
36	FW	CHN	Shao Shuai
37	FW	CHN	Yang Yihu

=== Reserve squad ===
As of 1 March 2019 Note: Flags indicate national team as defined under FIFA eligibility rules; some limited exceptions apply. Players may hold more than one non-FIFA nationality.

No.	Pos.	Nation	Player
41	DF	CHN	Chai Zhichao
42	DF	CHN	Ling Zeen
43	DF	CHN	Chen Yong
44	DF	CHN	Shao Mingxuan
45	MF	CHN	Cheng Yetong
46	MF	CHN	Zou Shuanglong
47	DF	CHN	Li Muxuan
48	MF	CHN	Cai Zili
49	MF	CHN	Zhang Shuai

No.	Pos.	Nation	Player
50	DF	CHN	Yang Zhenyu
51	DF	CHN	Wang Yaohui
52	MF	CHN	Huang Jianjian
53	DF	CHN	Zhu Oujie
54	GK	CHN	Wang Ziming
55	MF	CHN	Yuan Yuanhang
—	GK	CHN	Sheng Peng
—	MF	CHN	Cui Yijie
—	MF	CHN	Li Shisen

== Competitions ==
=== Chinese Super League ===
==== Table ====
Pos	Team	Pld	W	D	L	GF	GA	GD	Pts	Qualification or relegation
12	Guangzhou R&F	30	9	5	16	54	72	−18	32	
13	Shanghai Greenland Shenhua	30	8	6	16	43	57	−14	30	Qualification for AFC Champions League group stage (Note: Shanghai Greenland Shenhua qualified for the AFC Champions League group stage as Chinese FA Cup winners.)
14	Tianjin Tianhai (D)	30	4	13	13	40	53	−13	25	Dissolved at May 2020 after season 2019
15	Shenzhen F.C.	30	4	9	17	31	57	−26	21	
16	Beijing Renhe (R)	30	3	5	22	26	65	−39	14	Relegation to China League One

Source: CSL
Rules for classification:
- During season: 1) Points; 2) Goal difference; 3) Goals scored.
- After season: 1) Points; 2) Head-to-head points; 3) Head-to-head goal difference; 4) Head-to-head goals scored; 5) Scores of the weight ratio of the reserve league and youth leagues.
  (D) Disqualified; (R) Relegated
  Notes:

==== Results summary ====
Overall								Home						Away					
Pld	W	D	L	GF	GA	GD	Pts	W	D	L	GF	GA	GD	W	D	L	GF	GA	GD
30	3	5	22	26	65	−39	14	3	2	10	17	32	−15	0	3	12	9	33	−24

Last updated: 1 December 2019.
Source: League table

==== Results by round ====
Round	1	2	3	4	5	6	7	8	9	10	11	12	13	14	15	16	17	18	19	20	21	22	23	24	25	26	27	28	29	30
Ground	A	A	H	A	H	H	A	H	A	A	H	H	A	A	H	H	H	A	H	A	A	A	H	H	A	A	H	H	H	A
Result	L	L	L	L	W	D	D	L	L	L	W	W	L	L	L	L	L	L	L	L	D	L	L	L	L	D	L	L	D	L
Position	12	14	15	16	16	16	16	16	16	16	14	14	14	15	15	16	16	16	16	16	16	16	16	16	16	16	16	16	16	16

Updated to match(es) played on 1 December 2019. Source: Competitive matches
A = Away; H = Home; W = Win; D = Draw; L = Loss

==== Matches ====
1 March 2019 1	Shandong Luneng Taishan	1–0	Beijing Renhe	Jinan
18:00 CST (UTC+8)	Fellaini 50'	Report		Stadium: Jinan Olympic Sports Center Stadium; Attendance: 20,107; Referee: Shi Zhenlu

10 March 2019 2	Wuhan Zall	1–0	Beijing Renhe	Chongqing
15:30 CST (UTC+8)	Pengfei 62'; Bowen (yellow card) 90+2'	Report	Jie (yellow card) 45'; Xin (yellow card) 79'; Fernández (yellow card) 79'	Stadium: Chongqing Olympic Sports Center; Attendance: 21,920; Referee: Li Haixin

30 March 2019 3	Beijing Renhe	0–1	Beijing Sinobo Guoan	Beijing
15:30 CST (UTC+8)	Baojie (yellow card) 69'; Jian (yellow card) 79'	Report	Dabao (penalty missed) 41' 61'; Yuning (yellow card) 49'; Yang (yellow card) 63'	Stadium: Beijing Fengtai Stadium; Attendance: 22,376; Referee: Zhang Lei

7 April 2019 4	Shanghai Greenland Shenhua	5–1	Beijing Renhe	Shanghai
19:35 CST (UTC+8)	Moreno 21'; Guarín 33' (pen.); Ighalo 35', 66'; Lu 80' (yellow card) 81'	Report	Boyang (yellow card) 83'; Diop 86'	Stadium: Hongkou Football Stadium; Attendance: 21,756; Referee: Shi Zhenlu

14 April 2019 5	Beijing Renhe	2–1	Guangzhou Evergrande Taobao	Beijing
15:30 CST (UTC+8)	Luo Xin (yellow card) 26'; Diop 45'; Cao Yongjing (yellow card) 88'; Chen Jie 90+2'	Summary	Paulinho (red card) 15'; Yang Liyu 27'; Talisca (yellow card) 73'	Stadium: Beijing Fengtai Stadium; Attendance: 10,137; Referee: Wang Di

20 April 2019 6	Beijing Renhe	2–2	Shenzhen	Beijing Fengtai Stadium
15:30 CST UTC+8	Aluko (yellow card) 37' (goal) 50'; Zhang Yufeng (yellow card) 65'; Diop 77'	Summary	Selnæs 38'; Wang Peng (yellow card) 64'; Jin Qiang 88'	Stadium: Beijing; Attendance: 7,285; Referee: Shen Yinhao

27 April 2019 7	Hebei China Fortune	1–1	Beijing Renhe	Langfang
15:30 CST UTC+8	Mascherano (yellow card) 27'; Dong Xuesheng 90+5'	Summary	Aluko 13'; Shi Liang (yellow card) 75' (red card) 90+3'; Liu Jian (yellow card) 89'	Stadium: Langfang Stadium; Attendance: 13,563; Referee: Wang Jin

4 May 2019 8	Beijing Renhe	1–2	Henan Jianye	Beijing
15:30 CST UTC+8	Diop 19' (pen.); Liu Boyang (yellow card) 61' (yellow-red card) 77'; Cao Yongjing (yellow card) 81'; Rao Weihui (yellow card) 90+5'	Summary	Wang Shangyuan (yellow card) 17'; Bassogog 25'; Feng Zhuoyi 49'; Tim Chow (yellow card) 53'; Abduwali Ablet (yellow card) 83'	Stadium: Beijing Fengtai Stadium; Attendance: 5,274; Referee: Zhang Lei

11 May 2019 9	Chongqing Dangdai Lifan	2–0	Beijing Renhe	Chongqing
20:35 CST UTC+8	Fernandinho 69'; Dilmurat Mawlanyaz 85'	Report	Chen Jie (yellow card) 20'	Stadium: Chongqing Olympic Sports Center; Attendance: 32,157; Referee: (China) Shi Zhenlu

18 May 2019 10	Guangzhou R&F	3–1	Beijing Renhe	Guangzhou
16:30 CST UTC+8	Fan Yunlong (yellow card) 34'; Zhang Gong (yellow card) 38'; Saba 38' 72'; Zahavi 50'	Report	Aluko 2'; Cao Yongjing (yellow card) 25'; Wan Houliang (yellow card) 90+3'	Stadium: Yuexiushan Stadium; Attendance: 10,828; Referee: (Serbia) Milorad Mažić

25 May 2019 11	Beijing Renhe	2–1	Tianjin TEDA	Beijning
16:30 CST UTC+8	Diop 4'; Wang Xuanhong (yellow card) 5'; Aluko (yellow card) 26'; Nizamdin Ependi (yellow card) 42'; Luo Xin (yellow card) 44'; Zheng Kaimu 59' (o.g.)	Report	Mirahmetjan Muzepper (yellow card) 9' (yellow-red card) 87'; Hui Jiakang (yellow card) 10'; Liu Yang (yellow card) 20' (yellow-red card) 30'; Acheampong 76' (pen.)	Stadium: Beijing Fengtai Stadium; Attendance: 5,633; Referee: (China) Ma Ning (referee)

1 June 2019 12	Beijing Renhe	2–0	Tianjin Tianhai	Beijing
20:35 CST UTC+8	Zhang Cheng 16' (o.g.); Luo Xin (yellow card) 41'; Diop 69'; Wang Xuanhong (yellow card) 90+2'	Report	Wen Junjie (yellow card) 37'	Stadium: Beijing Fengtai Stadium; Attendance: 8,132; Referee: (England) Mark Clattenburg

16 June 2019 13	Jiangsu Suning	4–1	Beijing Renhe	Nanjing
20:35 CST UTC+8	Paletta (yellow card) 24'; Yang Boyu (yellow card) 45+1'; Éder 51' 81'; Tian Yinong (yellow card) 57'; Zhou Yun 90+1'; Gao Tianyi 90+6'	Report	Diop (yellow card) 38'; Nizamdin Ependi (yellow card) 42'; Zhang Wenzhao 77'; Zhang Yufeng (yellow card) 79'; Li Chenglong (yellow card) 90'	Stadium: Nanjing Olympic Sports Centre; Attendance: 21,649; Referee: (China) Zhang Lei (referee)

22 June 2019 14	Shanghai SIPG	3–0	Beijing Renhe	Shanghai
20:35	Cai Huikang (yellow card) 12'; Oscar 55'; Yang Shiyuan (yellow card) 63'; Li Shenglong 65'; Elkeson 69'	Report	Liu Jian (yellow card) 11'; Zhang Yufeng (yellow card) 52'; Wang Xuanhong (yellow card) 62'	Stadium: Shanghai Stadium; Attendance: 19,125; Referee: (China) Gu Chunhan

29 June 2019 15	Beijing Renhe	1–3	Dalian Yifang	Beijing
20:35 UTC+8	Diop 2'; Liu Boyang (yellow card) 90+4'	Report	Carrasco 51' (pen.); Hamšík 52'; Boateng 59'	Stadium: Beijing Fengtai Stadium; Attendance: 7,383; Referee: (China) Shi Zhenlu

7 July 2019 16	Beijing Renhe	0–2	Shandong Luneng Taishan	Beijing
20:35	Cao Yongjing (yellow card) 76'	Report	Pedro Delgado (yellow card) 49'; Pellè 64'; Dai Lin (yellow card) 78' (yellow-red card) 83'; Róger Guedes 87'	Stadium: Beijing Fengtai Stadium; Attendance: 8,965; Referee: (China) Ma Ning (referee)

13 July 2019 17	Beijing Renhe	0–2	Wuhan Zall	Beijing
20:35 UTC+8	Wan Houliang (red card) 26'; Manu (yellow card) 81'	Report	Léo Baptistão 44'; Kouassi 82' (pen.); Ming Tian (yellow card) 90+4'; Dong Chunyu (yellow card) 90+7'	Stadium: Beijing Fengtai Stadium; Attendance: 9,043; Referee: (China) Shen Yinhao

17 July 2019 18	Beijing Sinobo Guoan	2–1	Beijing Renhe	Beijing
20:35	Wang Ziming 6'; Chi Zhongguo (yellow card) 37'; Renato Augusto 81' (pen.); Jin Taiyan (yellow card) 90+1'	Report	Diop 61' (yellow card) 79'; Wang Xuanhong (yellow card) 64'; Zhang Yufeng (yellow card) 72'	Stadium: Workers' Stadium; Attendance: 38,461; Referee: (England) Mark Clattenburg

21 July 2019 19	Beijing Renhe	1–4	Shanghai Greenland Shenhua	Beijing
19:00 UTC+8	Zhang Chenlong (yellow card) 33'; Liu Jian (yellow card) 55'; Diop 61' (pen.); Luo Xin (yellow card) 84'	Report	Kim Shin-wook 5'; Jiang Shenglong 21' (yellow card) 67'; Moreno 38'; N'Doumbou 90+5'	Stadium: Beijing Fengtai Stadium; Attendance: 9,127; Referee: (China) Wang Jin

28 July 2019 20	Guangzhou Evergrande Taobao	3–0	Beijing Renhe	Guangzhou
20:35	Wei Shihao 2'; Paulinho 44' 48'	Report	Zhang Chenlong (yellow card) 41'; Zhang Yufeng (yellow card) 83'	Stadium: Tianhe Stadium; Attendance: 47,935; Referee: (China) Ma Ning (referee)

2 August 2019 21	Shenzhen	1–1	Beijing Renhe	Shenzhen
20:35 UTC+8	Mary 26'; Qiao Wei (yellow card) 69'	Report	Zhu Baojie 44' (yellow card) 57'; Du Wenyang (yellow card) 54'	Stadium: Shenzhen Universiade Sports Centre; Referee: (Serbia) Milorad Mažić

9 August 2019 22	Henan Jianye	2–1	Beijing Renhe	Zhengzhou
20:35 UTC+8	Ohandza (yellow card) 4' (goal) 51'; Ivo 10'; Sui Donglu (yellow card) 27'; Du Changjie (yellow card) 43'; Tim Chow (yellow card) 83'	Report	Du Wenyang (yellow card) 45+3' (yellow-red card) 60'; Chen Jie 47'; Nizamdin Ependi (yellow card) 55'; Xiang Hantian (yellow card) 77'; Cao Yongjing (yellow card) 83'; Luo Xin (yellow card) 83'	Stadium: Zhengzhou Hanghai Stadium; Attendance: 18.313; Referee: (China) Zhang Lei

14 August 2019 23	Beijing Renhe	1–2	Hebei China Fortune	Beijing
20:35 UTC+8	Nizamdin Ependi (yellow card) 17'; Fernández 28'; Liu Boyang (yellow card) 31'	Report	Lavezzi 32' (pen.); Wang Qiuming (yellow card) 45'; Jiang Wenjun (yellow card) 77'; Dong Xuesheng 79'	Stadium: Beijing Fengtai Stadium; Attendance: 8,107; Referee: (Portugal) Artur Soares Dias

13 October 2019 24	Beijing Renhe	1–4	Chongqing Dangdai Lifan	Beijing
20:35 UTC+8	Luo Xin (yellow card) 18'; Masika 26' (yellow card) 71'	Report	Alan Kardec 19' (pen.) 28' 45+2' 90+1' (pen.); Luo Hao (yellow card) 59'; Jiang Zhe (yellow card) 67'; Marcinho (yellow card) 87'	Stadium: Beijing Fengtai Stadium; Attendance: 5,002; Referee: (China) Wang Di

20 October 2019 25	Tianjin TEDA	1–0	Beijing Renhe	Tianjin
16:30 UTC+8	Wagner 59'; Mirahmetjan Muzepper (yellow card) 60'; Bastians (yellow card) 62'	Report	Nizamdin Ependi (yellow card) 37'	Stadium: Tianjin Olympic Center Stadium; Attendance: 11,221; Referee: (Japan) Jumpei Iida

27 October 2019 26	Tianjin Tianhai	2–2	Beijing Renhe	Tianjin
15:30 UTC+8	Yang Xu (yellow card) 45+3'; Alan 52'; Zhang Chenglin 62'; Wu Wei (yellow card) 86'	Report	Zhang Chenlong (yellow card) 7'; Diop 24'; Masika 45+1'; Zhu Baojie (yellow card) 45+3'; Liu Jian (yellow card) 59'; Luo Xin (yellow card) 65'; Manu (yellow card) 68'; Du Wenyang (yellow card) 86'	Stadium: Tianjin Olympic Center Stadium; Attendance: 10,377; Referee: (Serbia) Milorad Mažić

1 November 2019 27	Beijing Renhe	1–4	Guangzhou R&F	Beijing
15:30 UTC+8	Jin Hui 14'; Du Wenyang (yellow card) 82'; Fernández (red card) 88'	Report	Chen Zhizhao (yellow card) 31'; Yi Teng 47'; Zahavi 50'; Saba 58' 61'; Tang Miao (yellow card) 82'	Stadium: Beijing Fengtai Stadium; Attendance: 2,831; Referee: (England) Mark Clattenburg

23 November 2019 28	Beijing Renhe	2–3	Jiangsu Suning	Beijing
15:30 UTC+8	Manu 55'; Diop 59'; Yang Yihu (yellow card) 61'	Report	Miranda (yellow card) 5'; Alex Teixeira 18'; Xie Zhiwei (yellow card) 34'; Santini 41' 45'	Stadium: Beijing Fengtai Stadium; Attendance: 2,634; Referee: (China) Gu Chunhan

27 November 2019 29	Beijing Renhe	1–1	Shanghai SIPG	Beijing
19:35	Yang Yihu (yellow card) 28'; Diop 57'; Chen Jie (yellow card) 90'; Zhang Lie (yellow card) 90'	Report	Arnautović 3'; Zhang Wei (yellow card) 21'; Hulk (yellow card) 79'; Shi Ke (yellow card) 84' (yellow-red card) 90'; Cai Huikang (yellow card) 90+2'	Stadium: Beijing Fengtai Stadium; Attendance: 1,253; Referee: (China) Wang Jin

1 December 2019 30	Dalian Yifang	2–0	Beijing Renhe	Dalian
15:00 UTC+8	Zhou Xiao (yellow card) 39'; Rondón 57'; Carrasco 87'	Report	Du Wenyang (yellow card) 44'	Stadium: Dalian Sports Center Stadium; Attendance: 21,306; Referee: (China) Ma Ning

=== Chinese FA Cup ===
30 April 2019 Fourth Round	Liaoning	0–1	Beijing Renhe	Shenyang
15:30 CST	Wang Qiao (yellow card) 27'	Summary	Liu Xinyu 8'; Lin Jinghao (yellow card) 35'; Jin Hui (yellow card) 76'; Pengfei (yellow card) 90+4'	Stadium: Tiexi New District Sports Center; Attendance: 587; Referee: Shen Yinhao

29 May 2019 Last 16	Guangzhou Evergrande Taobao	5–0	Beijing Renhe	Guangzhou
20:35	Zhang Linpeng 4'; Yang Liyu 45'; Yan Dinghao (yellow card) 45+2'; Wei Shihao 49' 61' 67' (pen.)	Report	Mou Pengfei (yellow card) 70'	Stadium: Tianhe Stadium; Attendance: 19,732; Referee: (China) Shen Yinhao

== Squad statistics ==
As of match played 10 April 2019

=== Appearances and goals ===
No.	Pos	Nat	Player	Total		Super League		FA Cup	
No.	Pos	Nat	Player	Apps	Goals	Apps	Goals	Apps	Goals
3	MF	(China) CHN	Liu Boyang	4	0	4	0	0	0
4	DF	(China) CHN	Luo Xin	3	0	3	0	0	0
5	DF	(China) CHN	Wan Houliang	3	0	3	0	0	0
6	MF	(China) CHN	Zhang Wenzhao	2	0	0+2	0	0	0
8	MF	(Argentina) ARG	Augusto Fernández	3	0	3	0	0	0
9	FW	(Senegal) SEN	Makhete Diop	4	1	4	1	0	0
10	FW	(Nigeria) NGR	Sone Aluko	4	0	4	0	0	0
11	MF	(China) CHN	Zhu Baojie	2	0	1+1	0	0	0
12	GK	(China) CHN	Zhang Lie	4	0	4	0	0	0
13	FW	(China) CHN	Shi Liang	3	0	3	0	0	0
14	MF	(China) CHN	Wang Xuanhong	2	0	0+2	0	0	0
15	MF	(China) CHN	Chen Jie	3	0	3	0	0	0
17	DF	(China) CHN	Liu Jian	2	0	2	0	0	0
20	MF	(China) CHN	Cao Yongjing	2	0	2	0	0	0
21	FW	(China) CHN	Jin Hui	1	0	0+1	0	0	0
25	MF	(China) CHN	Liu Xinyu	1	0	0+1	0	0	0
26	MF	(China) CHN	Zhang Yufeng	3	0	1+2	0	0	0
29	MF	(China) CHN	Nizamdin Ependi	4	0	2+2	0	0	0
30	MF	(China) CHN	Feng Renliang	2	0	1+1	0	0	0
31	MF	(China) CHN	Rao Weihui	4	0	4	0	0	0
Players who appeared for Beijing Renhe but left during the season:

=== Goal scorers ===
Place	Position	Nation	Number	Name	Super League	FA Cup	Total
1	FW	(Senegal)	9	Makhete Diop	1	0	1
Total					1	0	1

=== Disciplinary record ===
No.	Pos	Nat	Player	Super League			FA Cup			Total		
No.	Pos	Nat	Player	Yellow card	Second yellow card	Red card	Yellow card	Second yellow card	Red card	Yellow card	Second yellow card	Red card
3	DF	(China)	Liu Boyang	1	0	0	0	0	0	1	0	0
4	DF	(China)	Luo Xin	1	0	0	0	0	0	1	0	0
8	MF	(Argentina)	Augusto Fernández	1	0	0	0	0	0	1	0	0
11	MF	(China)	Zhu Baojie	1	0	0	0	0	0	1	0	0
15	MF	(China)	Chen Jie	1	0	0	0	0	0	1	0	0
17	DF	(China)	Liu Jian	1	0	0	0	0	0	1	0	0
Total				6	0	0	0	0	0	6	0	0
