= 2019 Hebei China Fortune F.C. season =

Hebei China Fortune
2019 season
- Stadium: Langfang Stadium
- Super League: 11th
- FA Cup: Fourth Round

The 2019 Hebei China Fortune F.C. season was Hebei China Fortune's 4th consecutive season in the Chinese Super League since it started back in the 2004 season and 4th consecutive season in the top flight of Chinese football. This season Hebei China Fortune participates in the Chinese Super League and Chinese FA Cup.

== Squad statistics ==
=== Appearances and goals ===
As of match played unknown

No.	Pos	Nat	Player	Total		Super League		FA Cup	
No.	Pos	Nat	Player	Apps	Goals	Apps	Goals	Apps	Goals
				0	0	0	0	0	0
Players transferred out during the season

=== Disciplinary record ===
As of match played unknown

No.	Pos	Nat	Player	Super League			FA Cup			Total		
No.	Pos	Nat	Player	Yellow card	Second yellow card	Red card	Yellow card	Second yellow card	Red card	Yellow card	Second yellow card	Red card
				0	0	0	0	0	0	0	0	0
Total				0	0	0	0	0	0	0	0	0

== Competitions ==
=== Chinese Super League ===
==== Table ====
Pos	Team	Pld	W	D	L	GF	GA	GD	Pts	Qualification or relegation
9	Dalian Yifang	30	10	8	12	44	51	−7	38	
10	Chongqing Dangdai Lifan	30	9	9	12	36	47	−11	36	
11	Hebei China Fortune	30	9	6	15	37	55	−18	33	
12	Guangzhou R&F	30	9	5	16	54	72	−18	32	
13	Shanghai Greenland Shenhua	30	8	6	16	43	57	−14	30	Qualification for AFC Champions League group stage (Note: Shanghai Greenland Shenhua qualified for the AFC Champions League group stage as Chinese FA Cup winners.)

Source: CSL
Rules for classification:
- During season: 1) Points; 2) Goal difference; 3) Goals scored.
- After season: 1) Points; 2) Head-to-head points; 3) Head-to-head goal difference; 4) Head-to-head goals scored; 5) Scores of the weight ratio of the reserve league and youth leagues.
  Notes:

==== Results summary ====
Overall								Home						Away					
Pld	W	D	L	GF	GA	GD	Pts	W	D	L	GF	GA	GD	W	D	L	GF	GA	GD
25	7	5	13	28	43	−15	26	5	3	5	18	19	−1	2	2	8	10	24	−14

Last updated: 21 September 2019.
Source: League table

==== Results by round ====
Round	1	2	3	4	5	6	7	8	9	10	11	12	13	14	15	16	17	18	19	20	21	22	23	24	25	26	27	28	29	30
Ground	A	A	H	A	A	H	H	A	H	A	H	A	H	A	H	H	H	A	H	H	A	H	A	A	H	A	H			
Result	L	W	L	D	L	L	D	L	L	L	W	D	W	L	L	D	W	L	D	W	L	L	W	L	W					
Position	14	8	10	10	12	13	14	15	15	15	14	15	12	13	13	13	13	13	13	13	13	13	13	13	13					

Updated to match(es) played on 21 September 2019. Source: Competitive matches
A = Away; H = Home; W = Win; D = Draw; L = Loss

==== Matches ====
All times are local (UTC+8).

2 March 2019 1	Shenzhen F.C.	3–1	Hebei China Fortune	Shenzhen
20:00	Selnæs 45+3', 86'; Preciado 83'	Report (CSL); Report (Sina Sports)	El Kaabi 38'	Stadium: Shenzhen Universiade Sports Centre; Attendance: 34,986; Referee: Zhang Lei

9 March 2019 2	Shanghai Greenland Shenhua	1 – 2	Hebei China Fortune	Shanghai
19:35 UTC+8	Ighalo 34'; Cong Zhen (yellow card) 90'	Report	Zhao Yuhao (yellow card) 5'; El Kaabi 30' (yellow card) 88'; Feng Gang (yellow card) 50'; Zhang Junzhe (yellow card) 64'; Dong Xuesheng 65'; Geng Xiaofeng (yellow card) 85'	Stadium: Hongkou Football Stadium; Attendance: 21,123; Referee: (China) Wang Zhe

30 March 2019 3	Hebei China Fortune	1 – 2	Shanghai SIPG	Langfang
19:35 UTC+8	El Kaabi 73'; Mascherano (yellow card) 90+4'	Report	Elkeson 9'; Fu Huan (yellow card) 45'; Ahmedov 80'	Stadium: Langfang Stadium; Attendance: 18,566; Referee: (Serbia) Milorad Mažić

6 April 2019 4	Tianjin Tianhai	0 – 0	Hebei China Fortune	Tianjin
16:30 UTC+8		Report	Ren Hang (yellow card) 82'	Stadium: Tianjin Olympic Center; Attendance: 25,016; Referee: (China) Shen Yinhao

13 April 2019 5	Chongqing Dangdai Lifan	2 – 1	Hebei China Fortune	Chongqing
16:30 UTC+8	Luo Hao (yellow card) 20'; Fernandinho 52'; Sui Weijie (yellow card) 56'; Peng Xinli 70' (yellow card) 88'; Chen Lei (yellow card) 90'	Report	El Kabbi (yellow card) 13'; Luo Senwen (yellow card) 26'; Zhao Yuhao (yellow card) 61'; Tao Qianglong 78'	Stadium: Chongqing Olympic Sports Center; Attendance: 32,263; Referee: (China) Li Haixin

20 April 2019 6	Hebei China Fortune	0 – 1	Beijing Sinobo Guoan	Langfang
20:35 UTC+8	Wang Qiuming (yellow card) 43'; Yin Hongbo (yellow card) 52'	Report	Zhang Yuning 65'; Jiang Tao (yellow card) 84'; Zou Dehai (yellow card) 90+1'	Stadium: Langfang Stadium; Attendance: 24,283; Referee: (China) Gu Chunhan

27 April 2019 7	Hebei China Fortune	1 – 1	Beijing Renhe	Langfang
16:30 UTC+8	Mascherano (yellow card) 27'; Dong Xuesheng 90+5'	Report	Aluko 13'; Shi Liang (yellow card) 75' (red card) 90+3'; Liu Jian (yellow card) 89'	Stadium: Langfang Stadium; Attendance: 13,563; Referee: (China) Wang Jin

4 May 2019 8	Shandong Luneng Taishan	2 – 0	Hebei China Fortune	Jinan
20:35 UTC+8	Pellè 12' 23' (pen.)	Report		Stadium: Jinan Olympic Sports Center Stadium; Attendance: 20,135; Referee: (China) Huang Yejun

11 May 2019 9	Hebei China Fortune	2 – 3	Henan Jianye	Langfang
20:35 UTC+8	Marcão 29' 45+2'; Jin Yangyang (yellow card) 49' (yellow-red card) 87'	Report	Ohandza 6' 44' (pen.); Tim Chow (yellow card) 52'; Bassogog 66'	Stadium: Langfang Stadium; Attendance: 17,213; Referee: (England) Mark Clattenburg

17 May 2019 10	Tianjin TEDA	2 – 0	Hebei China Fortune	Tianjin
19:35 UTC+8	Johathan 46' 76' (yellow card) 90+3'; Zhao Honglüe (yellow card) 84'	Report	Russell (yellow card) 43'; Che Shiwei (yellow card) 79'	Stadium: Tianjin Olympic Center; Attendance: 11,299; Referee: (China) Li Haixin

26 May 2019 11	Hebei China Fortune	3 – 2	Jiangsu Suning	Langfang
20:35 UTC+8	El Kaabi 25'; Cui Lin (yellow card) 26'; Dong Xuesheng 31' 44'; Wang Qiuming (yellow card) 76'; Mascherano (yellow card) 90+6'; Geng Xiaofeng (yellow card) 90+7'	Report	Li Ang 2'; Alex Teixeira 14'	Stadium: Langfang Stadium; Attendance: 15,219; Referee: (China) Shi Zhenlu

1 June 2019 12	Guangzhou R&F	2 – 2	Hebei China Fortune	Guangzhou
20:35 UTC+8	Tang Miao (yellow card) 45+1'; Saba 52'; Jiang Jihong 86'	Report	Ren Hang 30'; Zhang Chengdong (yellow card) 45'; Mascherano (yellow card) 53'; Quiming 63'	Stadium: Yuexiushan Stadium; Attendance: 9,358; Referee: (China) Wang Jin

15 June 2019 13	Hebei China Fortune	1 – 0	Dalian Yifang	Langfang
20:35 UTC+8	Ren Hang (yellow card) 53'; Lavezzi 66'; Tao Qianglong (yellow card) 90+2'	Report	Mushekwi (red card) 73'; Huang Jiahui (yellow card) 90+3'	Stadium: Langfang Stadium; Attendance: 18,326; Referee: (China) Wang Zhe

22 June 2019 14	Guangzhou Evergrande Taobao	2 – 1	Hebei China Fortune	Guangzhou
20:35 UTC+8	Yan Dinghao 8'; Wei Shihao 60'; He Chao (yellow card) 63'	Report	Wang Qiuming (yellow card) 22'; Zhang Junzhe (yellow card) 52'; Marcão 69'	Stadium: Tianhe Stadium; Attendance: 47,539; Referee: (China) Zhang Lei (referee)

29 June 2019 15	Hebei China Fortune	0 – 2	Wuhan Zall	Langfang
20:35 UTC+8	Ren Hang (yellow card) 17'; Zhang Junzhe (yellow card) 62'	Report	Kouassi 57'; Rafael Silva 66' (pen.); Mbia (yellow card) 81'	Stadium: Langfang Stadium; Attendance: 19,223; Referee: (Serbia) Milorad Mažić

7 July 2019 16	Hebei China Fortune	1 – 1	Shenzhen	Langfang
20:35 UTC+8	Zhao Yuhao (yellow card) 49'; Dong Xuesheng 61'	Report	Li Yuanyi (yellow card) 52'; Jin Qiang (yellow card) 90+1'; Mary 90+4'	Stadium: Langfang Stadium; Attendance: 13,223; Referee: (England) Mark Clattenburg

12 July 2019 17	Hebei China Fortune	2 – 1	Shanghai Greenland Shenhua	Langfang
20:35 UTC+8	Mascherano (yellow card) 63'; Ren Hang (yellow card) 75'; Marcão 79'; Dong Xuesheng 83'	Report	Kim Shin-wook 15' (yellow card) 36'; Aidi (yellow card) 56'	Stadium: Langfang Stadium; Attendance: 15,786; Referee: (China) Zhang Lei (referee)

17 July 2019 18	Shanghai SIPG	3 – 0	Hebei China Fortune	Shanghai
20:35 UTC+8	Chen Binbin 40'; Hulk 84'; Oscar 86'	Report	Jiang Wenjun (yellow card) 87'	Stadium: Shanghai Stadium; Attendance: 21,912; Referee: (China) Gu Chunhan

21 July 2019 19	Hebei China Fortune	2 – 2	Tianjin Tianhai	Langfang
20:35 UTC+8	Zhang Chengdong (yellow card) 41'; Dong Xuesheng 54'; Fernandinho 84'	Report	Leonardo 49'; Pei Shuai (yellow card) 89'; Renatinho 90+2'; Yang Xu (yellow card) 90+6'	Stadium: Langfang Stadium; Attendance: 16,529; Referee: (England) Mark Clattenburg

27 July 2019 20	Hebei China Fortune	3 – 0	Chongqing Dangdai Lifan	Langfang
18:30 UTC+8	Mascherano (yellow card) 23'; Pan Ximing (yellow card) 26'; Marcão 36' (yellow card) 48' (goal) 51'; Wang Qiuming 59' (yellow card) 86'	Report	Yerjet Yerzat (yellow card) 37'; Jiang Zhe (yellow card) 53'	Stadium: Langfang Stadium; Attendance: 15,133; Referee: (China) Wang Di (referee)

2 August 2019 21	Beijing Sinobo Guoan	2 – 0	Hebei China Fortune	Beijing
19:35 UTC+8	Renato Augusto 90+2' (pen.); Bakambu 90+7' (pen.)	Report	Dong Xuesheng (yellow card) 83'	Stadium: Workers' Stadium; Attendance: 41,115; Referee: (China) Ma Ning (referee)

10 August 2019 22	Hebei China Fortune	0 – 3	Shandong Luneng Taishan	Langfang
20:35 UTC+8	Mascherano (yellow card) 11'	Report	Zheng Zheng (yellow card) 29'; Duan Liuyu 72'; Róger Guedes 76'; Fellaini 87'	Stadium: Langfang Stadium; Attendance: 21,326; Referee: (England) Mark Clattenburg

14 August 2019 23	Beijing Renhe	1 – 2	Hebei China Fortune	Beijing
20:35 UTC+8	Nizamdin Ependi (yellow card) 17'; Fernández 28'; Liu Boyang (yellow card) 31'	Report	Lavezzi 32' (pen.); Wang Qiuming (yellow card) 45'; Jiang Wenjun (yellow card) 77'; Dong Xuesheng 79'	Stadium: Beijing Fengtai Stadium; Attendance: 8,107; Referee: (Portugal) Artur Soares Dias

14 September 2019 24	Henan Jianye	4 – 1	Hebei China Fortune	Zhengzhou
20:35 UTC+8	Hu Ruibao (yellow card) 6'; Tim Chow 11'; Wang Shangyuan 20'; Lu Yao (yellow card) 45+1'; Feng Zhuoyi 56'; Bassogog 58'	Report	Wang Qiuming (yellow card) 9'; Jiang Wenjun (yellow card) 60'; Jiang Zhipeng 84'	Stadium: Zhengzhou Hanghai Stadium; Attendance: 20,189; Referee: (China) Wang Zhe

21 September 2019 25	Hebei China Fortune	2 – 1	Tianjin TEDA	Langfang
20:35 UTC+8	Fernandinho 23' (yellow card) 49'; Zhang Chengdong (yellow card) 48'; Pan Ximing (yellow card) 68'; Marcão 77'; Mascherano (yellow card) 86'; Chi Wenyi (yellow card) 90'	Report	Wagner 42'; Guo Hao (yellow card) 49'	Stadium: Langfang Stadium; Attendance: 18,263; Referee: (England) Mark Clattenburg

20 October 2019 26	Jiangsu Suning	–	Hebei China Fortune	Nanjing
20:35 UTC+8				Stadium: Nanjing Olympic Sports Centre

=== Chinese FA Cup ===
1 May 2019 Fourth Round	Chongqing Dangdai Lifan	1 - 0	Hebei China Fortune	Chongqing
20:00	Yin Congyao (yellow card) 39'; Alan Kardec 49'; Dong Honglin (yellow card) 88'; Yuan Mincheng (yellow card) 90+5'	Report	Wang Qiuming (yellow card) 88'; Geng Xiaofeng (red card) 90+4'	Stadium: Chongqing Olympic Sports Center; Attendance: 6,982; Referee: (China) Niu Minghui
