= Jin Hui =

Chinese footballer

Jin Hui 靳辉
Personal information
- Full name: Jin Hui
- Date of birth: 10 March 1988 (age 38)
- Place of birth: Zhengzhou, Henan, China
- Height: 1.83 m (6 ft 0 in)
- Position: Striker

Team information
- Current team: Beijing Renhe
- Number: 7

Senior career*
Years	Team	Apps	(Gls)
2010–2017	Beijing Baxy	151	(22)
2018–	Beijing Renhe	9	(0)
- * Club domestic league appearances and goals as of 31 December 2019

Jin Hui (Chinese: 靳辉; born 10 March 1988) is a Chinese footballer who currently plays for Beijing Renhe in the China League One.

== Club career ==
Jin Hui started his professional football career in July 2010 when he joined Beijing Baxy for the 2010 China League One campaign. On 7 January 2018, Jin transferred to Chinese Super League side Beijing Renhe. He made his Super League debut on 7 November 2018 in a 2–1 away loss against Shanghai SIPG, coming on as a substitute for Chen Jie in the 80th minute.

== Career statistics ==
Statistics accurate as of match played 31 December 2019.

Appearances and goals by club, season and competition
Club	Season	League			National Cup		Continental		Other		Total	
Club	Season	Division	Apps	Goals	Apps	Goals	Apps	Goals	Apps	Goals	Apps	Goals
Beijing Baxy	2010	China League One	10	0	-		-		-		10	0
Beijing Baxy	2011	China League One	6	0	1	0	-		-		7	0
Beijing Baxy	2012	China League One	18	0	0	0	-		-		18	0
Beijing Baxy	2013	China League One	23	5	0	0	-		-		23	5
Beijing Baxy	2014	China League One	27	4	1	2	-		-		28	6
Beijing Baxy	2015	China League One	20	2	3	0	-		-		23	2
Beijing Baxy	2016	China League One	21	4	2	0	-		-		23	4
Beijing Baxy	2017	China League One	26	7	0	0	-		-		26	7
Beijing Baxy	Total		151	22	7	0	0	0	0	0	158	22
Beijing Renhe	2018	Chinese Super League	1	0	0	0	-		-		1	0
Beijing Renhe	2019	Chinese Super League	8	0	2	0	-		-		10	0
Beijing Renhe	Total		9	0	2	0	0	0	0	0	11	0
Career total			160	22	9	2	0	0	0	0	169	24
