= Sun Weizhe =

Chinese footballer

Sun Weizhe 孙伟哲
Personal information
- Date of birth: 1 January 1997 (age 29)
- Place of birth: Handan, Hebei, China
- Height: 1.80 m (5 ft 11 in)
- Position: Midfielder

Team information
- Current team: Shijiazhuang Gongfu
- Number: 17

Youth career
- Hangzhou Greentown
- 2014: Guizhou Renhe

Senior career*
| Years | Team | Apps | (Gls) |
| 2018–2020 | Beijing Renhe | 12 | (0) |
| 2016–2017 | → Roeselare (loan) | 1 | (0) |
| 2021–2022 | Zibo Cuju | 52 | (1) |
| 2023–2025 | Guangxi Pingguo Haliao | 44 | (1) |
| 2025 | → Shanghai Jiading Huilong (loan) | 4 | (0) |
| 2025 | → Shijiazhuang Gongfu (loan) | 8 | (0) |
| 2026– | Shijiazhuang Gongfu | 0 | (0) |

International career^{‡}
| 2012 | China U-17 | 3 | (0) |
| 2015 | China U-20 | 5 | (0) |
| 2018 | China U-23 | 6 | (0) |
- * Club domestic league appearances and goals as of 10 March 2026 ‡ National team caps and goals as of 5 June 2018

Sun Weizhe (Chinese: 孙伟哲; pinyin: Sūn Wěizhé; born 1 January 1997) is a Chinese footballer who currently plays for China League One side Shijiazhuang Gongfu.

== Club career ==
Sun Weizhe started his professional football career in 2015 when he was promoted to Chinese Super League club Guizhou Renhe's first team squad. He made his senior debut on 7 July 2015 in a 3–2 away win over second-tier club Jiangxi Liansheng in the 2015 Chinese FA Cup. Sun was loaned to Belgian club Roeselare in September 2016. On 26 February 2017, he made his debut for the club in a 1–1 away draw against Lierse, coming on as a substitute for Saviour Godwin in the 89th minute. He continued to play five matches in the 2016–17 Europa League play-offs.

Sun returned to Beijing Renhe in the summer of 2017. He made his league debut for Renhe on 28 October 2017, playing the whole match in a 2–1 home win against Hangzhou Greentown. Sun made his Super League debut on 3 March 2018 in a 1–0 away loss against Chongqing Dangdai Lifan, coming on for Luo Xin in the 73rd minute.

== Career statistics ==
As of 8 December 2022.

Appearances and goals by club, season and competition
| Club | Season | League | | | National Cup | | Continental | | Other | | Total | |
| Club | Season | Division | Apps | Goals | Apps | Goals | Apps | Goals | Apps | Goals | Apps | Goals |
|---|---|---|---|---|---|---|---|---|---|---|---|---|
| Guizhou Renhe /Beijing Renhe | 2015 | Chinese Super League | 0 | 0 | 1 | 0 | - | | - | | 1 | 0 |
| Guizhou Renhe /Beijing Renhe | 2017 | China League One | 1 | 0 | 0 | 0 | - | | - | | 1 | 0 |
| Guizhou Renhe /Beijing Renhe | 2018 | Chinese Super League | 5 | 0 | 1 | 0 | - | | - | | 6 | 0 |
| Guizhou Renhe /Beijing Renhe | 2019 | Chinese Super League | 1 | 0 | 1 | 0 | - | | - | | 2 | 0 |
| Guizhou Renhe /Beijing Renhe | 2020 | China League One | 4 | 0 | 0 | 0 | - | | - | | 4 | 0 |
| Guizhou Renhe /Beijing Renhe | Total | | 11 | 0 | 3 | 0 | 0 | 0 | 0 | 0 | 14 | 0 |
| Roeselare (loan) | 2016–17 | Belgian First Division B | 1 | 0 | 0 | 0 | - | | 5 (Note: Appearances in EL play-offs) | 0 | 6 | 0 |
| Zibo Cuju | 2021 | China League One | 27 | 1 | 2 | 0 | - | | - | | 29 | 1 |
| Zibo Cuju | 2022 | China League One | 25 | 0 | 1 | 0 | - | | - | | 26 | 0 |
| Zibo Cuju | Total | | 52 | 1 | 3 | 0 | 0 | 0 | 0 | 0 | 55 | 1 |
| Guangxi Pingguo Haliao | 2023 | China League One | 0 | 0 | 0 | 0 | - | | - | | 0 | 0 |
| Career total | | | 64 | 1 | 7 | 0 | 0 | 0 | 5 | 0 | 75 | 1 |
