= Xiang Hantian =

Chinese footballer

Personal information
- Date of birth: 21 November 1995 (age 30)
- Place of birth: Guiyang, Guizhou, China
- Height: 1.75 m (5 ft 9 in)
- Positions: Winger; full-back

Youth career
- –2013: Guizhou Renhe
- 2011–2012: → AD Oeiras (loan)

Senior career*
Years	Team	Apps	(Gls)
2014–2021	Beijing Renhe	60	(2)

International career
2013–2014	China U-20	19	(2)
2016	China U-23	1	(0)
- * Club domestic league appearances and goals as of 31 December 2019

Xiang Hantian (Chinese: 向汉天; born 21 November 1995) is a retired Chinese football player.

== Club career ==
Xiang Hantian received organized football training with Guizhou Renhe and went to Portugal following Chinese Football Association 500.com Stars Project in the end of 2011. He was promoted to Guizhou Renhe first team squad in 2014. On 22 April 2014, Xiang made his debut for Guizhou Renhe in the last group match of 2014 AFC Champions League against Western Sydney Wanderers. He scored his first goal for the club on 10 July 2015 in a 5–2 win against Shanghai Shenxin.

== Career statistics ==
Statistics accurate as of match played 31 December 2019.

Appearances and goals by club, season and competition
Club	Season	League			National Cup		Continental		Other		Total	
Club	Season	Division	Apps	Goals	Apps	Goals	Apps	Goals	Apps	Goals	Apps	Goals
Guizhou Renhe/ Beijing Renhe	2014	Chinese Super League	0	0	0	0	1	0	-		1	0
Guizhou Renhe/ Beijing Renhe	2015	Chinese Super League	7	1	3	0	-		-		10	0
Guizhou Renhe/ Beijing Renhe	2016	China League One	15	0	2	1	-		-		17	1
Guizhou Renhe/ Beijing Renhe	2017	China League One	11	1	0	0	-		-		11	1
Guizhou Renhe/ Beijing Renhe	2018	Chinese Super League	22	0	2	0	-		-		24	0
Guizhou Renhe/ Beijing Renhe	2019	Chinese Super League	5	0	0	0	-		-		5	0
Guizhou Renhe/ Beijing Renhe	Total		60	2	7	1	1	0	0	0	68	3
Career total			60	2	7	1	1	0	0	0	68	3
