= Zhu Baojie =

Chinese footballer

Zhu Baojie 朱宝杰
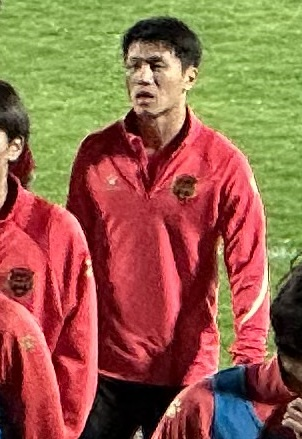
- Zhu Baojie in May 2025

Personal information
- Date of birth: 11 August 1989 (age 37)
- Place of birth: Liuzhou, Guangxi, China
- Height: 1.70 m (5 ft 7 in)
- Position: Midfielder

Team information
- Current team: Meizhou Hakka
- Number: 33

Youth career
- 2001–2007: Shanghai Shenhua Football School

Senior career*
Years	Team	Apps	(Gls)
2008	Shaanxi Chanba	1	(0)
2009–2013	Shanghai Shenxin	115	(2)
2014	Guangzhou R&F	16	(0)
2015–2019	Beijing Renhe	97	(5)
2020–2022	Shanghai Shenhua	50	(1)
2023–2024	Shenzhen Peng City	50	(1)
2025–2026	Ningbo FC	29	(0)
2026–	Meizhou Hakka	0	(0)
- * Club domestic league appearances and goals as of 31 December 2022

Zhu Baojie (simplified Chinese: 朱宝杰; traditional Chinese: 朱寶傑; pinyin: Zhū Bǎojié; born 11 August 1989 in Liuzhou, Guangxi) is a Chinese footballer, who currently plays as a midfielder for Meizhou Hakka.

== Club career ==
Zhu Baojie began his professional football career playing for Shaanxi Chanba and would go on to make his debut on July 2, 2008, in a league game against Qingdao Jonoon in a 3–1 victory. This was to be his only game for the team before he moved to second-tier side Nanchang Bayi where he was given the opportunity to be a first team regular. While initially Zhu found it difficult to adjust within the team the head coach Zhu Jiong showed faith with him while the team pushed for promotion. This turned out to be a success and Nanchang came second in the division, winning promotion to the top tier. On 26 May 2010, he scored his first senior goal in a 1–1 home draw against Dalian Shide. On 29 January 2014, Zhu transferred to fellow Chinese Super League side Guangzhou R&F.

On 5 January 2015, Zhu transferred to fellow Chinese Super League side Guizhou Renhe. He would make his debut for the club in a league game on March 7, 2015, against Liaoning Whowin F.C. that ended in a 1–0 defeat. This was followed by his first goal for the team on April 17, 2015, against Beijing Guoan F.C. that ended in a 2–2 draw. While he would establish himself as a regular within the team by making twenty appearances within the league he was unfortunately a member of the squad that saw the club relegated at the end of the 2015 league season. At the beginning of the 2016 league season the club would move cities to Beijing and rename themselves Beijing Renhe. Zhu would stay with the team and at the end of the 2017 league season he was part of the squad that gained promotion back into the top tier.

On 25 June 2026, Zhu joined China League One club Meizhou Hakka.

== Career statistics ==
Statistics accurate as of match played 31 December 2022.

Appearances and goals by club, season and competition
Club	Season	League			National Cup		Continental		Other		Total	
Club	Season	Division	Apps	Goals	Apps	Goals	Apps	Goals	Apps	Goals	Apps	Goals
Shaanxi Chanba	2008	Chinese Super League	1	0	-		-		-		1	0
Shanghai Shenxin	2009	China League One	22	0	-		-		-		22	0
Shanghai Shenxin	2010	Chinese Super League	20	1	-		-		-		20	1
Shanghai Shenxin	2011	Chinese Super League	30	1	0	0	-		-		30	1
Shanghai Shenxin	2012	Chinese Super League	25	0	0	0	-		-		25	0
Shanghai Shenxin	2013	Chinese Super League	18	0	0	0	-		-		18	0
Shanghai Shenxin	Total		115	2	0	0	0	0	0	0	115	2
Guangzhou R&F	2014	Chinese Super League	16	0	2	1	-		-		18	1
Beijing Renhe	2015	Chinese Super League	20	2	2	0	-		-		22	2
Beijing Renhe	2016	China League One	19	1	0	0	-		-		19	1
Beijing Renhe	2017	China League One	18	0	1	1	-		-		19	1
Beijing Renhe	2018	Chinese Super League	21	1	1	0	-		-		22	1
Beijing Renhe	2019	Chinese Super League	19	1	0	0	-		-		19	1
Beijing Renhe	Total		97	5	4	1	0	0	0	0	103	6
Shanghai Shenhua	2020	Chinese Super League	16	1	0	0	3	0	-		19	1
Shanghai Shenhua	2021	Chinese Super League	13	0	0	0	-		-		13	0
Shanghai Shenhua	2022	Chinese Super League	21	0	1	0	-		-		22	0
Shanghai Shenhua	Total		50	1	1	0	3	0	0	0	54	1
Career total			279	8	7	2	3	0	0	0	289	10
