= Li Chenglong =

Chinese association football player

Personal information
- Date of birth: 6 January 1997 (age 29)
- Place of birth: Weifang, Shandong, China
- Height: 1.78 m (5 ft 10 in)
- Position: Defender

Youth career
- –2015: Zhejiang Greentown
- 2015–2018: Beijing Renhe

Senior career*
Years	Team	Apps	(Gls)
2016–2020	Beijing Renhe	4	(0)
2016–2017	→ Roeselare (loan)	0	(0)
2021	Heilongjiang Ice City	0	(0)

International career
2018	China U21	2	(0)
- * Club domestic league appearances and goals as of 12:01, 31 December 2020 (UTC)

Li Chenglong (simplified Chinese: 李成龙; traditional Chinese: 李成龍; pinyin: Lǐ Chénglóng; born 6 January 1997) is a Chinese former footballer who played as a defender.

== Club career ==
Li Chenglong would make his professional debut on 30 April 2019 in a Chinese FA Cup game against Liaoning FC in a 1–0 victory. This would be followed by his first league appearance on 18 May 2019 against Guangzhou R&F in a game that ended in a 3–1 defeat.

== Career statistics ==
As of 31 December 2020.

Club	Season	League			Cup		Continental		Other		Total	
Club	Season	Division	Apps	Goals	Apps	Goals	Apps	Goals	Apps	Goals	Apps	Goals
Beijing Renhe	2016	Chinese Super League	0	0	0	0	–		-		0	0
Beijing Renhe	2017	Chinese Super League	0	0	0	0	–		-		0	0
Beijing Renhe	2018	Chinese Super League	0	0	0	0	–		-		0	0
Beijing Renhe	2019	Chinese Super League	4	0	2	0	–		-		6	0
Beijing Renhe	2020	China League One	0	0	-		-		0 (Note: Appearances in China League One relegation play-offs)	0	0	0
Beijing Renhe	Total		4	0	2	0	0	0	0	0	6	0
Roeselare (loan)	2016–17	Belgian First Division B	0	0	0	0	–		0	0	0	0
Career total			4	0	2	0	0	0	0	0	6	0
