= Sone Aluko =

Nigerian footballer (born 1989)

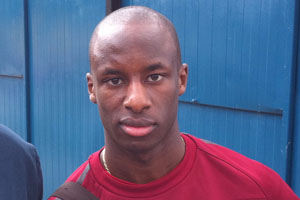
- Aluko with Aberdeen in 2010

Personal information
- Full name: Omatsone Folarin Aluko
- Date of birth: 19 February 1989 (age 37)
- Place of birth: Hounslow, England
- Height: 5 ft 8 in (1.73 m)
- Positions: Forward; winger

Team information
- Current team: Ipswich Town (coach)

Youth career
- 1997–2007: Birmingham City

Senior career*
Years	Team	Apps	(Gls)
2007–2008	Birmingham City	0	(0)
2007–2008	→ Aberdeen (loan)	20	(3)
2008	→ Blackpool (loan)	1	(0)
2008–2011	Aberdeen	82	(7)
2011–2012	Rangers	21	(12)
2012–2016	Hull City	90	(13)
2016–2017	Fulham	49	(8)
2017–2021	Reading	93	(6)
2019	→ Beijing Renhe (loan)	16	(3)
2021–2024	Ipswich Town	45	(3)
Total		417	(55)

International career
2004–2005	England U16	4	(0)
2005–2006	England U17	3	(0)
2006	England U18	1	(0)
2007–2008	England U19	3	(0)
2009	Nigeria U20	3	(0)
2011	Nigeria U23	1	(0)
2009–2015	Nigeria	7	(2)
- * Club domestic league appearances and goals as of 10 March 2024 (UTC)

Omatsone Folarin Aluko (born 19 February 1989) is a professional football coach and former player who played as a forward or winger. He is currently a first team coach at Ipswich Town.

Aluko began his career at Birmingham City, graduating from the club's academy to make his senior debut in 2007. He joined Aberdeen on loan in the 2007–08 season and was loaned to Blackpool at the beginning of the 2008–09 season. After just two appearances for Blackpool, he signed for Aberdeen permanently in August 2008. He left Aberdeen in July 2011 at the end of his contract. Aluko signed for Rangers in November 2011 and scored 12 goals in 21 appearances during the 2011–12 season. After one season at Rangers, he returned to England to join Hull City. He made over 100 appearances for Hull during a four-year spell at the club, helping Hull win promotion to the Premier League in 2013 and reach the 2014 FA Cup Final. He left Hull to join Fulham in 2016, before joining Reading in 2017. He spent four seasons at Reading, making over 100 appearances for the club, while also spending time out on loan at Beijing Renhe in 2019. In August 2021, he signed for Ipswich Town where he remained until his retirement from football in May 2024.

Born in England, Aluko was capped by England at all youth levels up to under-19 before accepting an offer to play for Nigeria. He won caps at under-20 and under-23 levels, before making his senior debut in 2009.

His sister Eniola Aluko was born in Nigeria and is a former professional footballer. She formerly played for Juventus and England.

== Club career ==
=== Birmingham City ===
Aluko was born in Hounslow, London, and brought up from a young age in Birmingham. He progressed through Birmingham City's youth system, which he joined at the age of eight. He was given a first-team squad number in the 2005–06 season, and was an unused substitute in a Premier League match against Arsenal at Highbury in October 2005. He made his first-team debut for Birmingham on 28 August 2007 as a late substitute in a League Cup tie against Hereford United.

==== Aberdeen (loan) ====
In August 2007, Aluko joined Scottish Premier League club Aberdeen on loan until January 2008. He made his debut for Aberdeen as a late substitute in the UEFA Cup group match against Panathinaikos on 25 October 2007. He scored his first goal for the club the following week, opening the scoring in a 2–0 victory over Dundee United. In January, the loan deal was extended to keep Aluko at Aberdeen for the rest of the season. On 14 February 2008, as part of a performance which earned him the man-of-the-match award, he scored Aberdeen's second goal in a 2–2 draw against Bayern Munich in the UEFA Cup Round of 32. He scored 4 goals in 31 appearances during his loan at Aberdeen.

==== Blackpool (loan) ====
Aluko signed for Blackpool on a month's emergency loan on 8 August 2008, and made his debut the following day as a late substitute in the Seasiders' 0–1 home defeat to Bristol City. He made 2 appearances for Blackpool before returning from loan at the end of August.

=== Aberdeen ===
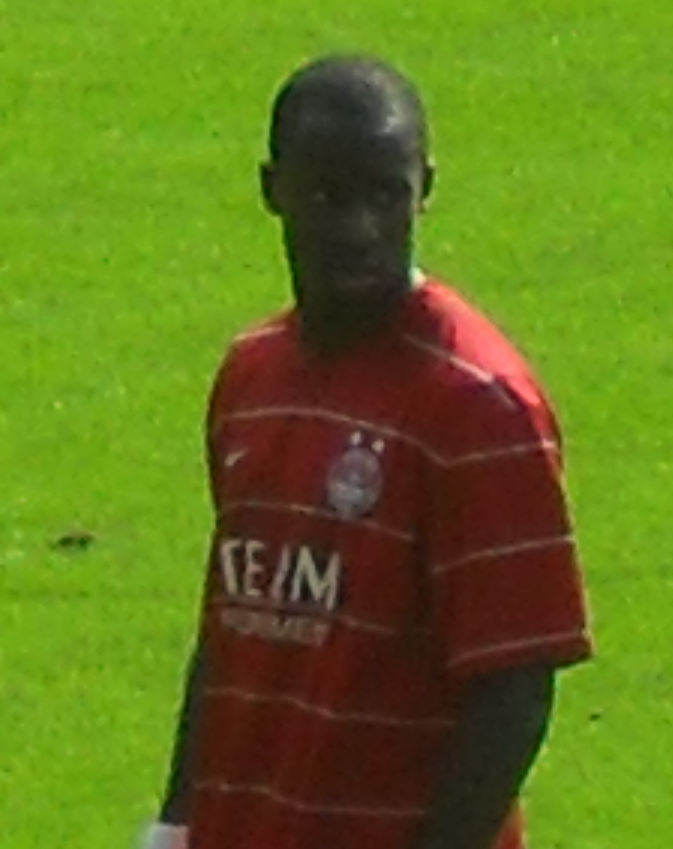
Aluko playing for Aberdeen in 2009

On transfer deadline day, 1 September 2008, Aluko returned to Aberdeen on a permanent basis, signing a three-year contract for a fee of £50,000. He made his return in a 1–2 home defeat to Hamilton Academical on 13 September, and scored his first goal since rejoining the club to clinch Aberdeen's first home win of the season, a single-goal victory over Kilmarnock on 1 November. Aluko went on to win the SPL Young Player of the Month award for November 2008. Aluko featured regularly following his return to Aberdeen, playing 37 matches during the 2008–09 season, scoring 4 goals.

He continued to be a key part of the Aberdeen first-team during the 2009–10 season. He scored his first goal of the season in a 1–3 loss against Celtic on 15 August. In total, Aluko scored 3 times in 26 appearances over the course of the season.

Aluko made his first appearance of the 2010–11 season in Aberdeen's opening match of the campaign, starting the match in a 4–0 home win against Hamilton Academical at the Pittodrie Stadium. On 15 February, he scored his first goal of the season in a 1–2 home loss against Motherwell. He also scored in Aberdeen's following match, a 5–0 home win against Kilmarnock on 19 February. He did not score again for the rest of the season, scoring twice in 33 appearances in total during the season. He left the club at the end of his contract in July 2011.

=== Rangers ===
Following his release from Aberdeen, Aluko had a trial with Juventus prior to the 2011–12 season. He then went on trial at Rangers. Rangers were impressed with Aluko and offered him a contract, but the move was held up while Aberdeen and Rangers negotiated compensation. Aluko signed for Rangers until the end of the season on 24 November 2011 after a deal was agreed. He made his Rangers debut in a 0–1 away loss to Kilmarnock on 27 November. Aluko was banned for two games for diving to win a penalty in a match between Rangers and Dunfermline on 3 December 2011. Rangers' manager, Ally McCoist, stated "The three gentlemen on the panel have effectively called my player a cheat and a liar, neither of which he is". Aluko scored his first goal for Rangers in a 3–0 home win against Motherwell at Ibrox on 2 January. On 25 March 2012, Aluko scored the opening goal in Rangers' 3–2 victory over Celtic. He scored his first senior hat-trick in Rangers 4–0 victory at St Johnstone on the final day of the 2011–12 Scottish Premier League season. He scored 12 goals in 23 appearances during his first season at Rangers, his best goal return to date.

In June 2012, with his contract set to expire but the club holding an option to extend it, Aluko lodged an objection against the contract being transferred from Rangers to a new company set up by Charles Green. PFA Scotland had previously commented that players were entitled to become free agents if they objected to the transfer. Aluko raised a constructive dismissal claim against Rangers.

=== Hull City ===
==== 2012–13 season ====
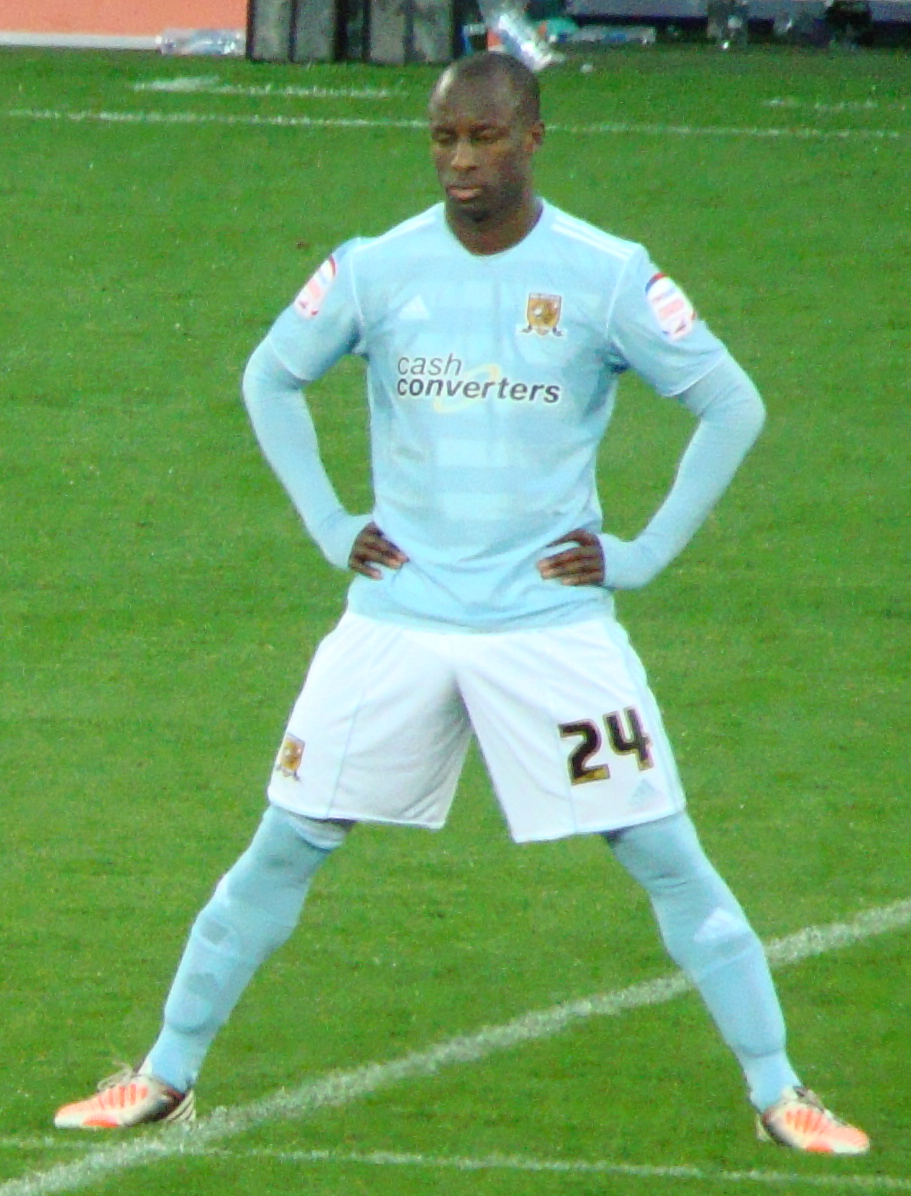
Aluko playing for Hull City in 2012

On 25 July 2012, it was confirmed that Aluko had signed a two-year deal with Hull City. He made his debut in a home match against Brighton & Hove Albion on 18 August. On 1 September 2012 he scored his first goal for the club against Bolton Wanderers at the KC Stadium. After the international break, Aluko scored his second goal for Hull City in the following game against Millwall to make it 4–0 before half-time, with Hull going onto win the match 4–1. On 2 October, Aluko made scored his third goal in a Hull City shirt by scoring a wonderful strike from 20 yards out into the top corner against Blackpool.

His next goal came at the end of October against Bristol City, himself and Jay Simpson linked up to put Hull 1–0 ahead inside 8 minutes, to which the commentator compared the goal to Barcelona. He bagged another goal in the next game, at home to Barnsley, with teammate Ahmed Elmohamady's cross was half-cleared and Aluko, unlike Barnsley's defenders, was alert to the ball and fired home from a tight angle. He then made it 3 in 3 and 6 goals for the season against Wolverhampton Wanderers on 6 November, putting in a free-kick from 25 yards into the bottom-left corner past Wolves goalkeeper Carl Ikeme. On 17 November, Aluko scored twice against former club Birmingham City to put Hull 0–2 up, they went on to win the game 2–3. This made it five goals in five games for Aluko and eight goals for the season. In November 2012, Aluko picked up an Achilles injury, initially ruling him out for a month, which Hull City incidentally won all four games he was missing, but later in January the injury flared up again. This meant he would require surgery, with fears he would be out for 6 months, but after successful surgery, he was expected to be back in 2 months time. Aluko scored 8 goals in 24 appearances during the 2012–13 season, helping Hull win promotion to the Premier League following a second placed league finish in the Championship.

==== 2013–14 season ====
Aluko made his Premier League debut in a 0–2 away defeat against Chelsea on 18 August. His first goal of the season, a 76th-minute "stunning volley", was Hull's winner in a 3–2 victory away to Newcastle United on 21 September. In November Steve Bruce announced that Aluko denied a contract extension, this blow to Hull came shortly after Aluko tore his Achilles again which would see him out of action until February. He signed a new two-and-a-half-year contract with the club on 3 January 2014, telling the club website "I'm happy to be extending my stay here and I was always hopeful it would get sorted". On 17 May 2014 he played as a substitute in the 2014 FA Cup Final against Arsenal.

==== 2014–15 season ====
Aluko's first appearance of the 2014–15 season came in Hull's UEFA Europa League tie against AS Trenčín on 31 July. He scored his first goal of the season in the second leg of the tie against Trenčín, netting an 80th-minute winner in a 2–1 victory. His first Premier League goal of the season came on 3 December when he scored the equaliser in a 1–1 draw against Everton. Aluko scored twice in 31 appearances during the season, as Hull suffered relegation from the Premier League after finishing 18th.

==== 2015–16 season ====
He continued to feature regularly for Hull during the 2015–16 season, scoring a late winner in a 2–1 win against Fulham on 19 August. His next goal did not come until March, when he scored an equalising goal in a 1–1 draw with Nottingham Forest. He helped Hull to a 4th-place league finish, qualifying for the Championship play-offs as a result, with Hull going onto win promotion back to the Premier League after winning the play-off final against Sheffield Wednesday.

On 2 June 2016, it was announced that Aluko and teammate Ryan Taylor would leave the club prior to their contract expiry.

=== Fulham ===
On 8 July 2016, Aluko joined Fulham on a free transfer. Aluko signed a two-year deal with an option for a further year. He made his debut for Fulham in a 1–0 win over Newcastle United on the opening day of the 2016–17 season. On 13 August 2016, Aluko scored his first goal for Fulham, the opener in a 2–1 victory over Preston North End. He quickly became a key part of the Fulham first-team during his first season at the club, starting 44 league games and making 50 appearances in all competitions, scoring 9 goals. He helped Fulham reach the EFL Championship play-offs following a 6th placed league finish, with Fulham eventually losing out to Reading following a 1–2 aggregate loss over two legs in the semi-finals.

He made his first appearance of the 2017–18 season in the opening match against Norwich City on 5 August, with the match ending in a 1–1 draw. He started Fulham's opening four league matches of the season, before leaving to join Reading at the end of August.

=== Reading ===
On 29 August 2017, Aluko joined Reading for an undisclosed fee, signing a four-year deal, with the fee later being reported to be £7.5 million. He made his Reading debut in a 0–1 away loss against Bristol City on 9 September. He scored his first goal for the club on 31 October, netting the final goal in a 3–1 win against Nottingham Forest. He scored again in the following match in a 4–2 win against Derby County on 4 November. On 30 March, he scored the winning goal in a 1–0 win against Rotherham United. Aluko scored 3 goals in 40 appearances during his first season at Reading.

Aluko started in the opening match of the 2018–19 season against Derby County, a match which ended in a 1–2 loss. He scored his first goal of the season in the reverse fixture against Derby, a match which also ended in a 1–2 win for Derby. He featured less frequently for Reading during his second season at the club, making 20 appearances in all competitions, scoring once.

==== Beijing Renhe (loan) ====
On 26 February 2019, Aluko joined Beijing Renhe on loan until the end of the 2019 season. He made 16 appearances in the Chinese Super League during his loan spell, scoring 3 goals.

==== Return to Reading ====
After returning from his loan spell at Beijing Renhe in January, he made his first appearance for Reading in an FA Cup third-round tie against former loan club Blackpool. He made his first league appearance of the season in a 0–1 loss against Bristol City. Aluko struggled for regular game time during the second half of the 2019–20 season, making 6 appearances, with only 2 appearances coming in the league.

He managed to work his way back into the Reading first-team during the 2020–21 season. He made his first appearance of the season in a 3–1 EFL Cup first round win against Colchester United on 5 September. On 21 November, Aluko scored his first goal of the season in a 2–4 defeat against Bournemouth. He scored twice in 36 appearances over the course of the 2020–21 season. Aluko was released by Reading when his contract expired at the end of the 2020–21 season.

=== Ipswich Town ===
Aluko joined Ipswich Town on a free transfer on 6 August 2021, signing a one-year contract with the option to extend the deal by an additional year. He made his debut in a 0–1 loss against Newport County in an EFL Cup first-round tie on 10 August. On 16 October 2021, Aluko scored his first goals for Ipswich with a brace in a 2–2 draw against Cambridge United. Three days later, he scored again in a 4–0 win against Portsmouth. Aluko quickly became an important part of the Ipswich squad, as the most senior player in the team during his first season at the club. He captained the team in FA Cup and EFL Trophy matches during the first half of the season. Ipswich manager Kieran McKenna praised him for his contributions both on and off the pitch; "I can't speak highly enough of him as a person really, around the place he's great with the younger players, he mentors, he speaks, he gives advice but he never sticks it in your face, he doesn't go around telling everyone that he's played in the Premier League, but he's there for advice whenever people need it. He has a quiet word in his own way whenever it's needed." On 26 April 2022, Aluko activated the one-year extension in his contract having made 36 appearances in all competitions during the season, keeping him at the club until 2023. After helping Ipswich to promotion back to the Premier League, Aluko announced his retirement from football on 6 May 2024.

== International career ==
=== England Youth ===
Aluko represented England at under-16, under-17 and under-18 level before making his debut for the England under-19 team on 11 September 2007 in a friendly against Belarus under-19. He was involved in two of the goals in a 4–0 win. He was selected in the 23-man provisional squad for the 2008 UEFA European Under-19 Football Championship but did not make the final 18.

=== Nigeria ===
Aluko was named in the squad for the Nigeria under-20 national football team for the 2009 FIFA U-20 World Cup in Egypt. He played in games against Venezuela, Spain and Tahiti.

Aluko was called up to the Nigerian national team for a friendly against the Republic of Ireland on 29 May 2009, an offer which with the support of his family he chose to accept. He made his full international debut in the starting eleven, forcing the Irish goalkeeper to save his 40-yard lobbed free kick and playing the first 61 minutes of the game.

In April 2010, he was named in the provisional Nigeria squad for the 2010 FIFA World Cup, but failed to make the final cut. He was finally called up by former Nigerian coach Stephen Keshi and therefore has a chance to add to his one cap against Republic of Ireland in May 2009 after he represented England at various age-group levels. He was brought into the squad to face Namibia and Malawi in the World Cup Qualifiers in the month of June 2012, but was an unused sub for both games.

Aluko was included in a pre-selection for the 2013 Africa Cup of Nations but had to renounce because of an injury. Nigeria later won the tournament.

He scored his first goals for Nigeria against South Africa in a 2–2 draw on 19 November 2014 in the qualifying round for the 2015 Africa Cup of Nations.

== Personal life ==
Aluko's older sister, Eniola, is a former footballer who played for England 102 times at full international level; she played in two World Cup quarter finals and reached the quarter finals of the London 2012 Olympics football tournament with Great Britain. His father Gbenga is a former MP in Nigeria.

== Career statistics ==
=== Club ===
As of match played 4 May 2024

Appearances and goals by club, season and competition
Club	Season	League			National Cup		League Cup		Continental		Other		Total	
Club	Season	Division	Apps	Goals	Apps	Goals	Apps	Goals	Apps	Goals	Apps	Goals	Apps	Goals
Birmingham City	2007–08	Premier League	0	0	0	0	1	0	—		—		1	0
Birmingham City	2008–09	Championship	0	0	0	0	0	0	—		—		0	0
Birmingham City	Total		0	0	0	0	1	0	—		—		1	0
Aberdeen (loan)	2007–08	Scottish Premier League	20	3	4	0	2	0	5 (Note: Appearances in UEFA Cup)	1	—		31	4
Blackpool (loan)	2008–09	Championship	1	0	0	0	1	0	—		—		2	0
Aberdeen	2008–09	Scottish Premier League	32	2	4	2	1	0	—		—		37	4
Aberdeen	2009–10	Scottish Premier League	22	3	2	0	0	0	2 (Note: Appearances in UEFA Europa League)	0	—		26	3
Aberdeen	2010–11	Scottish Premier League	28	2	4	0	1	0	—		—		33	2
Aberdeen	Total		82	7	10	2	2	0	2	0	—		96	9
Rangers	2011–12	Scottish Premier League	21	12	2	0	0	0	0	0	—		23	12
Hull City	2012–13	Championship	23	8	0	0	1	0	—		—		24	8
Hull City	2013–14	Premier League	17	1	5	0	0	0	—		—		22	1
Hull City	2014–15	Premier League	25	1	1	0	1	0	4	1	—		31	2
Hull City	2015–16	Championship	25	3	4	0	2	0	—		0	0	31	3
Hull City	Total		90	13	10	0	4	0	4	1	—		108	14
Fulham	2016–17	Championship	45	8	3	1	0	0	—		2 (Note: Appearances in EFL Championship play-offs)	0	50	9
Fulham	2017–18	Championship	4	0	0	0	0	0	—		0	0	4	0
Fulham	Total		49	8	3	1	0	0	—		2	0	54	9
Reading	2017–18	Championship	39	3	1	0	0	0	—		—		40	3
Reading	2018–19	Championship	19	1	1	0	0	0	—		—		20	1
Reading	2019–20	Championship	2	0	4	0	0	0	—		—		6	0
Reading	2020–21	Championship	33	2	1	0	2	0	—		—		36	2
Reading	Total		93	6	7	0	2	0	—		0	0	102	6
Beijing Renhe (loan)	2019	Chinese Super League	16	3	0	0	—		—		—		16	3
Ipswich Town	2021–22	League One	30	3	4	0	1	0	—		1 (Note: Appearance in EFL Trophy)	0	36	3
Ipswich Town	2022–23	League One	14	0	3	0	1	0	—		1	0	19	0
Ipswich Town	2023–24	Championship	1	0	2	0	4	1	—		—		6	1
Ipswich Town	Total		46	3	7	0	6	1	—		1	0	59	4
Career total			418	55	43	3	18	1	11	2	3	0	492	61

=== International ===
Appearances and goals by national team and year
National team	Year	Apps	Goals
Nigeria
Nigeria	2009	1	0
Nigeria	2012	1	0
Nigeria	2014	4	2
Nigeria	2015	1	0
Total		7	2

==== International goals ====
As of match played 19 November 2014. Nigeria score listed first, score column indicates score after each Aluko goal.

International goals by date, venue, cap, opponent, score, result and competition
No.	Date	Venue	Cap	Opponent	Score	Result	Competition	Ref
1.	19 November 2014	Akwa Ibom Stadium, Uyo, Nigeria	6	South Africa	1–2	2–2	2015 Africa Cup of Nations qualification	
2.	19 November 2014	Akwa Ibom Stadium, Uyo, Nigeria	6	South Africa	2–2	2–2	2015 Africa Cup of Nations qualification	

== Honours ==
Hull City

- Football League Championship runner-up: 2012–13
- FA Cup runner-up: 2013–14

Ipswich Town

- EFL League One runner-up: 2022–23
- EFL Championship runner-up: 2023–24

Individual

- Scottish Premier League Young Player of the Month: November 2008
- EFL Championship Player of the Month: November 2012, October 2016
