= Du Wenyang =

Chinese footballer (born 1990)

Du Wenyang 杜文洋
Personal information
- Date of birth: 28 January 1990 (age 36)
- Place of birth: Zaozhuang, Shandong, China
- Height: 1.82 m (5 ft 11 1/2 in)
- Position: Defender

Senior career*
Years	Team	Apps	(Gls)
2008	Hebei Tiangong		
2011–2014	Liaoning Whowin	0	(0)
2013	→ Shandong Tengding (loan)	15	(0)
2014	→ Dalian Transcendence (loan)	14	(1)
2015–2018	Hebei China Fortune	28	(0)
2019–2020	Beijing Renhe	15	(0)
- * Club domestic league appearances and goals as of 31 December 2019

Du Wenyang (Chinese: 杜文洋; pinyin: Dù Wényáng; born 28 January 1990) is a Chinese footballer.

== Club career ==
Du Wenyang started his professional football career in 2008 when he joined China League Two side Hebei Tiangong. He joined Chinese Super League side Liaoning Whowin in 2011. On 11 May 2011, he made his senior debut in the second round of 2011 Chinese FA Cup with a 1–0 home win against Shenzhen Phoenix. Although playing another FA Cup match against Shaanxi Chanba on 26 May 2011, Du failed to establish himself within the team. He was loaned to League Two club Shandong Tengding and Dalian Transcendence in the 2013 and 2014 season, respectively.

On 17 February 2015, Du transferred to China League One side Hebei China Fortune. He made his debut for Hebei on 14 March 2015 in a 1–0 home defeat against Beijing BIT. He played 22 league matches in the season as Hebei China Fortune won promotion to the Chinese Super League by finishing the runners-up in the league. He made gus Super League debut on 23 September 2016, in a 1–1 home draw against Chongqing Lifan, coming on as a substitute for Luo Senwen in the 88th minute. Du was sent to the reserved team in 2017. He returned to the first team in the 2018 season, and played in every minute for the club in the last five matches of the season. On 7 November 2018, he scored an own goal in a 2–1 away defeat against Guangzhou R&F.

On 27 February 2019, Du joined Chinese Super League side Beijing Renhe.

== Career statistics ==
As of 31 December 2019.

Appearances and goals by club, season and competition
Club	Season	League			National Cup		Continental		Other		Total	
Club	Season	Division	Apps	Goals	Apps	Goals	Apps	Goals	Apps	Goals	Apps	Goals!
Hebei Tiangong	2008	China League Two			-		-		-			
Liaoning Whowin	2011	Chinese Super League	0	0	2	0	-		-		2	0
Liaoning Whowin	2012	Chinese Super League	0	0	0	0	-		-		0	0
Liaoning Whowin	Total		0	0	2	0	0	0	0	0	2	0
Shandong Tengding (loan)	2013	China League Two	15	0	-		-		-		15	0
Dalian Transcendence (loan)	2014	China League Two	14	1	2	0	-		-		16	1
Hebei China Fortune	2015	China League One	22	0	3	0	-		-		25	0
Hebei China Fortune	2016	Chinese Super League	1	0	2	0	-		-		3	0
Hebei China Fortune	2018	Chinese Super League	5	0	0	0	-		-		5	0
Hebei China Fortune	Total		28	0	5	0	0	0	0	0	33	0
Beijing Renhe	2019	Chinese Super League	15	0	1	0	-		-		16	0
Career total			72	1	10	0	0	0	0	0	82	1
