= Liu Xinyu (footballer, born 1999) =

Chinese association football player

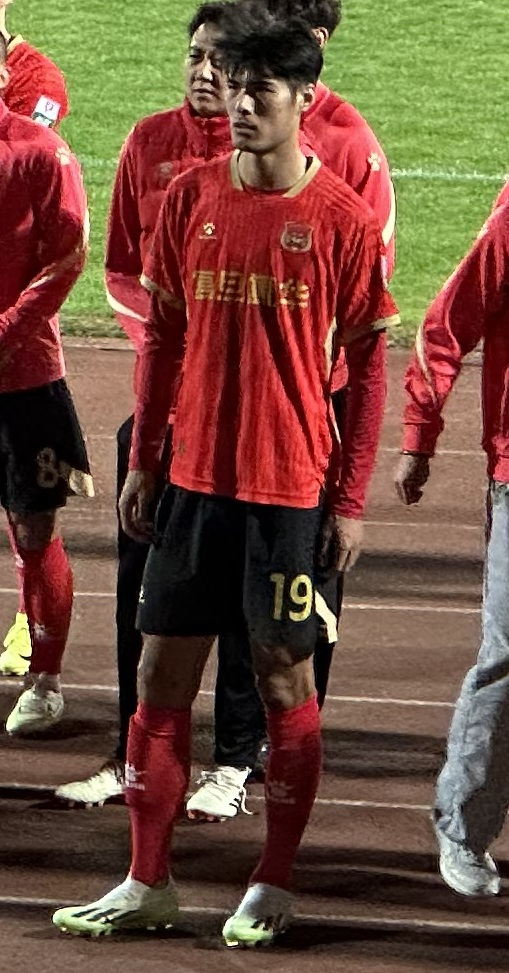
- Liu Xinyu in May 2025

Personal information
- Date of birth: 26 August 1999 (age 27)
- Height: 1.93 m (6 ft 4 in)
- Position: Midfielder

Team information
- Current team: Lanzhou Longyuan Athletic
- Number: 19

Senior career*
| Years | Team | Apps | (Gls) |
| 2019–2020 | Beijing Renhe | 13 | (2) |
| 2021 | Heilongjiang Ice City | 18 | (5) |
| 2022–2023 | Sichuan Jiuniu | 15 | (1) |
| 2023 | → Liaoning Shenyang Urban (loan) | 14 | (1) |
| 2024 | Hunan Billows | 23 | (6) |
| 2025 | Shanghai Jiading Huilong | 8 | (0) |
| 2025 | Foshan Nanshi | 13 | (0) |
| 2026– | Lanzhou Longyuan Athletic | 0 | (0) |
- * Club domestic league appearances and goals as of 29 April 2022

Liu Xinyu (simplified Chinese: 刘鑫宇; traditional Chinese: 劉鑫宇; pinyin: Liú Xīnyǔ; born 26 August 1999) is a Chinese footballer currently playing as a midfielder for China League Two side Lanzhou Longyuan Athletic.

== Career statistics ==
=== Club ===
As of 21 November 2020

| Club | Season | League | | | Cup | | Continental | | Other | | Total | |
| Club | Season | Division | Apps | Goals | Apps | Goals | Apps | Goals | Apps | Goals | Apps | Goals |
|---|---|---|---|---|---|---|---|---|---|---|---|---|
| Beijing Renhe | 2019 | Chinese Super League | 4 | 0 | 2 | 1 | – | | – | | 6 | 1 |
| Beijing Renhe | 2020 | China League One | 7 | 0 | – | | – | | 2 (Note: Appearances in China League One relegation playoffs) | 2 | 9 | 2 |
| Career total | | | 11 | 0 | 2 | 1 | 0 | 0 | 2 | 2 | 15 | 3 |
