= Zhang Yufeng (footballer) =

Chinese footballer

Zhang Yufeng 张宇峰
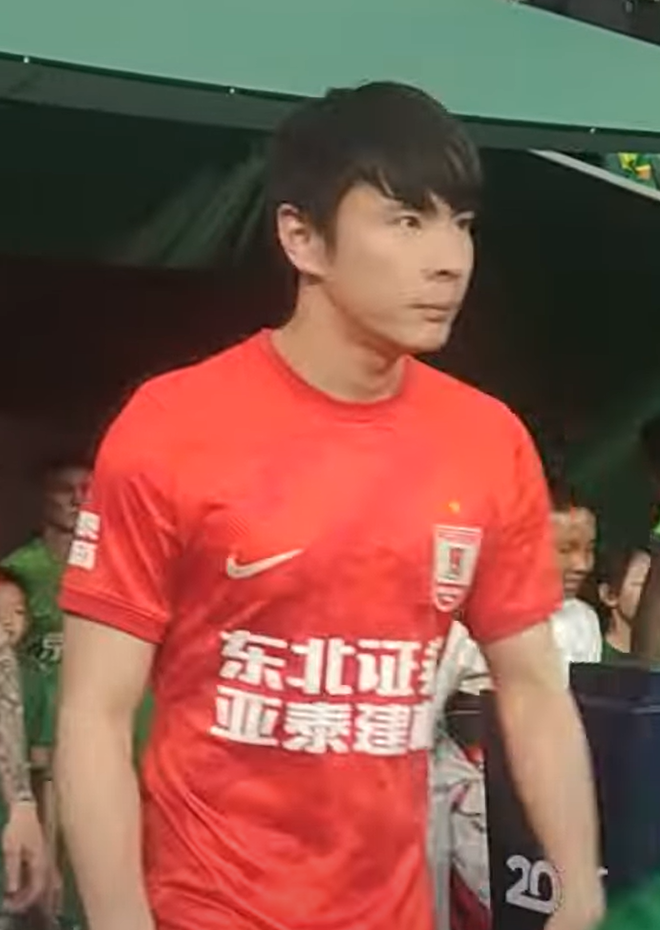
- Zhang Yufeng in June 2023

Personal information
- Date of birth: 5 January 1998 (age 28)
- Place of birth: Enshi, Hubei, China
- Height: 1.77 m (5 ft 9 1/2 in)
- Position: Midfielder

Team information
- Current team: Shenzhen Peng City (on loan from Yunnan Yukun)
- Number: 19

Youth career
- Beijing Renhe

Senior career*
Years	Team	Apps	(Gls)
2016–2020	Beijing Renhe	47	(1)
2021–2024	Changchun Yatai	96	(4)
2025–	Yunnan Yukun	23	(0)
2026–	→ Shenzhen Peng City (loan)	11	(0)
- * Club domestic league appearances and goals as of 19 November 2026

Zhang Yufeng (Chinese: 张宇峰; pinyin: Zhāng Yǔfēng; born 5 January 1998) is a Chinese professional footballer who currently plays for Chinese Super League club Shenzhen Peng City, on loan from Yunnan Yukun.

== Club career ==
=== Beijing Renhe ===
Zhang Yufeng started his professional football career in July 2016 when he was promoted to China League One club Beijing Renhe's first team squad. On 25 September 2016, he made his senior debut in a 3–3 home draw against Meizhou Hakka, coming on as a substitute for Guillermo Molins in the 55th minute. On 3 May 2017, Zhang was sent off by dangerous tackle to Ralf in a 2017 Chinese FA Cup match against Beijing Guoan. He received a ban of two matches for his unsporting behavior on 6 May 2017. Zhang played only one league match of 2017 season on 21 October after Beijing Renhe won promotion to the first tier in advance, in a 2–0 away loss against Nei Mongol Zhongyou. On 10 March 2018, he made his Chinese Super League debut in a 2–1 away win over Tianjin Quanjian, coming on for Ivo in the 87th minute.

=== Changchun Yatai ===
On 13 April 2021, Zhang joined Chinese Super League club Changchun Yatai. He made his debut in a league game for Yatai on 22 April 2021, in a 2–1 win against Dalian Professional. On 24 June 2022, he scored his first goal for the club in a 3–1 victory against Guangzhou City.

=== Yunnan Yukun ===
On 20 January 2025, Zhang joined Chinese Super League club Yunnan Yukun. On 11 July 2026, Zhang was loaned out to Chinese Super League club Shenzhen Peng City for the rest of 2026 season.

== Career statistics ==
As of match played 31 May 2026.

Appearances and goals by club, season and competition
Club	Season	League			National Cup		Continental		Other		Total	
Club	Season	Division	Apps	Goals	Apps	Goals	Apps	Goals	Apps	Goals	Apps	Goals
Beijing Renhe	2016	China League One	2	0	0	0	–		–		2	0
Beijing Renhe	2017	China League One	1	0	2	0	–		–		3	0
Beijing Renhe	2018	Chinese Super League	7	0	0	0	–		–		7	0
Beijing Renhe	2019	Chinese Super League	22	0	2	0	–		–		24	0
Beijing Renhe	2020	China League One	15	1	–		–		2 (Note: Appearances in Promotion/Relegation Playoffs)	0	17	1
Beijing Renhe	Total		47	1	4	0	0	0	2	0	53	1
Changchun Yatai	2021	Chinese Super League	16	0	2	0	–		–		18	0
Changchun Yatai	2022	Chinese Super League	31	1	0	0	–		–		31	1
Changchun Yatai	2023	Chinese Super League	26	1	1	0	–		–		27	1
Changchun Yatai	2024	Chinese Super League	23	2	1	0	–		–		24	2
Changchun Yatai	Total		96	4	4	0	0	0	0	0	100	4
Yunnan Yukun	2025	Chinese Super League	18	0	4	0	–		–		22	0
Yunnan Yukun	2026	Chinese Super League	5	0	1	0	–		–		6	0
Yunnan Yukun	Total		23	0	5	0	0	0	0	0	28	0
Career total			166	5	13	0	0	0	2	0	181	5
