= Liu Boyang =

Chinese footballer (born 1997)

Liu Boyang 刘博洋
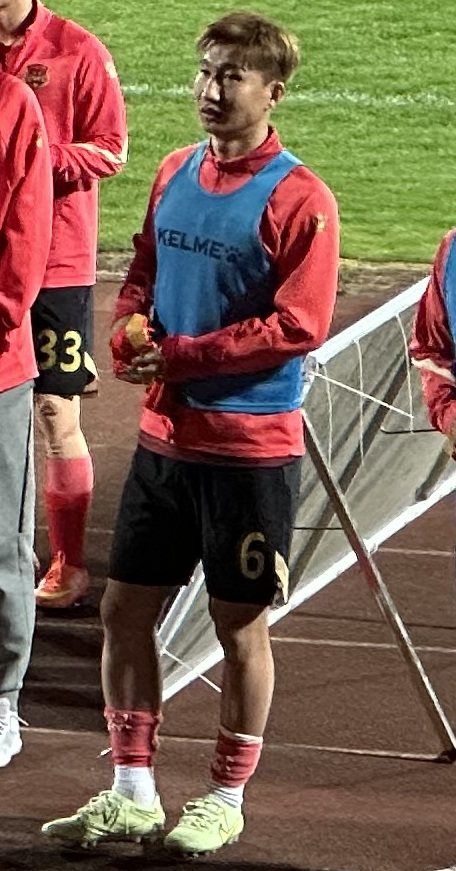
- Liu Boyang in May 2025

Personal information
- Date of birth: 18 January 1997 (age 29)
- Place of birth: Handan, Hebei, China
- Height: 1.80 m (5 ft 11 in)
- Position: Defender

Team information
- Current team: Wuxi Wugo (on loan from Ningbo FC)
- Number: 2

Youth career
- 2011–2016: Beijing Renhe

Senior career*
Years	Team	Apps	(Gls)
2016–2020	Beijing Renhe	46	(1)
2021–2022	Kunshan FC	34	(0)
2023	Jinan Xingzhou	15	(0)
2024–	Ningbo FC	32	(0)
2026–	→ Wuxi Wugo (loan)	0	(0)

International career^{‡}
2015–2016	China U19	12	(0)
2018	China U23	3	(0)
- * Club domestic league appearances and goals as of 25 December 2022 ‡ National team caps and goals as of 5 June 2018

Liu Boyang (Chinese: 刘博洋; pinyin: Liú Bóyáng; born 18 January 1997) is a Chinese footballer who currently plays as a defender for Wuxi Wugo, on loan from Ningbo FC.

== Club career ==
Liu Boyang joined Guizhou Renhe's youth academy in 2011. He started his professional football career in July 2016 when he was promoted to Beijing Renhe's first team squad. On 25 September 2016, he made his senior debut in a 3–3 home draw against Meizhou Hakka, coming on as a substitute for Yi Teng in the 74th minute. He tested positive for the diuretic hydrochlorothiazide after the match and received a ban of one year. Liu returned to field in 2018 after Beijing Renhe won promotion to the first tier. On 10 March 2018, he made his Chinese Super League debut in a 2–1 away win over Tianjin Quanjian. Unfortunately he would go on to be part of the squad that were relegated at the end of the 2019 Chinese Super League. This would be followed by another relegation at the end of the 2020 China League One campaign.

On 10 April 2021, Liu would transfer on a free to second tier club Kunshan FC for the start of the 2021 China League One season. He would go on to make his debut in a league game on 25 April 2021 against Beijing BSU in a game that ended in a 2-2 draw. He would go on to establish himself as regular within the team and was part of the squad that won the division and promotion to the top tier at the end of the 2022 China League One campaign.

On 1 July 2026, Liu was loaned to China League One club Wuxi Wugo.

== Career statistics ==
As of match played 31 December 2025.

Appearances and goals by club, season and competition
Club	Season	League			National Cup		Continental		Other		Total	
Club	Season	Division	Apps	Goals	Apps	Goals	Apps	Goals	Apps	Goals	Apps	Goals!
Beijing Renhe	2016	China League One	1	0	0	0	-		-		1	0
Beijing Renhe	2018	Chinese Super League	13	0	1	0	-		-		14	0
Beijing Renhe	2019	Chinese Super League	18	0	1	0	-		-		19	0
Beijing Renhe	2020	China League One	14	1	-		-		2 (Note: Appearances in China League One relegation playoffs)	0	16	1
Beijing Renhe	Total		46	1	2	0	0	0	2	0	50	0
Kunshan FC	2021	China League One	20	0	1	0	-		-		21	0
Kunshan FC	2022	China League One	14	0	2	0	-		-		16	0
Kunshan FC	Total		34	0	3	0	0	0	0	0	37	0
Jinan Xingzhou	2023	China League One	15	0	0	0	-		-		15	0
Shanghai Jiading Huilong/ Ningbo FC	2024	China League One	18	0	0	0	-		-		18	0
Shanghai Jiading Huilong/ Ningbo FC	2025	China League One	11	0	1	0	-		-		12	0
Shanghai Jiading Huilong/ Ningbo FC	Total		29	0	1	0	0	0	0	0	30	0
Career total			124	1	6	0	0	0	2	0	132	1

== Honours ==
=== Club ===
Kunshan

- China League One: 2022
