= Wang Qiuming =

Chinese footballer

Wang Qiuming 王秋明
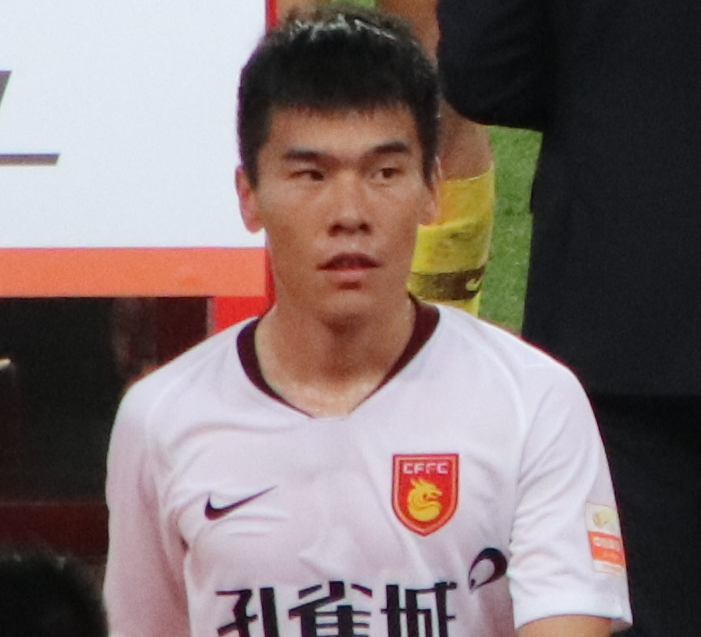
- Wang in 2019

Personal information
- Full name: Wang Qiuming
- Date of birth: 9 January 1993 (age 33)
- Place of birth: Tianjin, China
- Height: 1.69 m (5 ft 7 in)
- Position: Midfielder

Team information
- Current team: Tianjin Jinmen Tiger
- Number: 30

Youth career
- Tianjin Teda

Senior career*
Years	Team	Apps	(Gls)
2013–2017	Tianjin Teda	49	(4)
2018–2021	Hebei FC	75	(6)
2022–	Tianjin Jinmen Tiger	142	(21)

International career^{‡}
2015	China U22	1	(0)
2023–	China	7	(1)
- * Club domestic league appearances and goals as of 22 November 2026 ‡ National team caps and goals as of 26 November 2023

Wang Qiuming (Chinese: 王秋明; born 9 January 1993) is a Chinese professional footballer who plays as a midfielder for Chinese Super League club Tianjin Jinmen Tiger, whom he captains, and the China national team.

== Club career ==
In 2013, Wang Qiuming was promoted to Chinese Super League side Tianjin Teda's first team squad. He made his senior debut on 10 July 2013 in the fourth round of 2013 Chinese FA Cup against Liaoning Whowin, coming on as a substitute for Li Benjian. He was loaned to Tianjin Huaruide in January 2014. After Tianjin Huaruide failed to register in the China League Two, Wang returned to Tianjin Teda in June 2014. On 16 August 2014, he made his league debut in a 2–1 away defeat against Guangzhou Evergrande, coming on as a substitute for Wang Xinxin in the 74th minute. His clearance mistake in the stoppage time resulted Guangzhou Evergrande's winning goal indirectly, he apologized in his weibo after the match. He scored his first senior goal on 2 November 2014, in a 3–3 home draw against Shanghai Dongya.

On 28 February 2018, Wang transferred to fellow Chinese Super League side Hebei China Fortune. He would make his debut in a league game on 11 March 2018 against Guizhou Hengfeng in a 3-2 victory. This would be followed by his first goal for the club on 24 April 2018 in a Chinese FA Cup game against Suzhou Dongwu in a 4-0 victory. He would establish himself as a regular within the club and help them achieve their highest position in the league when they finished sixth within the 2018 Chinese Super League campaign. After four seasons with the club he would return to Tianjin, with them renamed as Tianjin Jinmen Tiger on 12 April 2022.

== International career ==
On 16 June 2023, Wang made his international debut in a 4–0 home win over Myanmar in an international friendly game. He scored his first goal in a 2–0 win over Vietnam on 10 October 2023.

Wang was named in China's squad for the 2023 AFC Asian Cup in Qatar and started the team's opening match against Tajikistan on 13 January 2024.

== Career statistics ==
Statistics accurate as of match played 31 December 2025.

Appearances and goals by club, season and competition
Club	Season	League			National Cup		Continental		Other		Total	
Club	Season	Division	Apps	Goals	Apps	Goals	Apps	Goals	Apps	Goals	Apps	Goals
Tianjin Teda	2013	Chinese Super League	0	0	1	0	-		-		1	0
Tianjin Teda	2014	Chinese Super League	5	1	0	0	-		-		5	1
Tianjin Teda	2015	Chinese Super League	19	3	2	0	-		-		21	3
Tianjin Teda	2016	Chinese Super League	14	0	1	1	-		-		15	1
Tianjin Teda	2017	Chinese Super League	11	0	2	0	-		-		13	0
Tianjin Teda	Total		49	4	6	1	0	0	0	0	55	5
Hebei China Fortune/ Hebei	2018	Chinese Super League	16	0	1	1	-		-		17	1
Hebei China Fortune/ Hebei	2019	Chinese Super League	25	2	1	0	-		-		26	2
Hebei China Fortune/ Hebei	2020	Chinese Super League	15	2	0	0	-		-		15	2
Hebei China Fortune/ Hebei	2021	Chinese Super League	19	2	0	0	-		-		19	2
Hebei China Fortune/ Hebei	Total		75	6	2	1	0	0	0	0	77	7
Tianjin Jinmen Tiger	2022	Chinese Super League	27	4	0	0	-		-		27	4
Tianjin Jinmen Tiger	2023	Chinese Super League	27	6	1	0	-		-		28	6
Tianjin Jinmen Tiger	2024	Chinese Super League	28	6	1	0	-		-		29	6
Tianjin Jinmen Tiger	2025	Chinese Super League	30	5	2	0	-		-		32	5
Tianjin Jinmen Tiger	Total		112	21	4	0	0	0	0	0	116	21
Career total			236	31	12	2	0	0	0	0	248	33

List of international goals scored by Wang Qiuming
No.	Date	Venue	Opponent	Score	Result	Competition
1	10 October 2023	Dalian Sports Center Stadium, Dalian, China	Vietnam	1–0	2–0	Friendly
