= Luo Xin (footballer, born 1990) =

Chinese footballer

Luo Xin 罗歆
Personal information
- Date of birth: 7 February 1990 (age 36)
- Place of birth: Chongqing, Sichuan, China
- Height: 1.82 m (5 ft 11 1/2 in)
- Position: Defender

Team information
- Current team: Nantong Zhiyun
- Number: 4

Senior career*
Years	Team	Apps	(Gls)
2011–2016	Chongqing Lifan	59	(0)
2017–2019	Beijing Renhe	71	(0)
2020–2023	Henan FC	63	(1)
2024	Nantong Zhiyun	24	(1)
2025	Foshan Nanshi	10	(0)
2025–	Nantong Zhiyun	8	(0)
- * Club domestic league appearances and goals as of 9 March 2026

Luo Xin (Chinese: 罗歆; born 7 February 1990 in Chongqing) is a Chinese football player who currently plays for Nantong Zhiyun as a defender in the China League One.

== Club career ==
Luo Xin was promoted to Chongqing Lifan's first team squad in 2011. On 23 April 2011, he made his senior debut in a 2–0 win against Yanbian FC, coming on as a substitute for Lü Haidong in the 64th minute. On 22 March 2015, he made his Super League debut in the season's third match game against Henan Jianye. On 23 December 2016, Chongqing Lifan officially confirmed that Luo had left the club after a disagreement in negotiations for extending his contract.

On 28 February 2017, Luo transferred to China League One side Beijing Renhe. He would make his debut for the club in a league game on 11 March 2017 against Shanghai Shenxin that ended in a 2-2 draw. With them he would quickly establish himself as a vital member of the squad that won promotion to the top tier at the end of the 2017 China League One campaign. After three seasons with the club he would leave to join another top tier club in Henan Jianye (now known as Henan) where he would make his debut for them in a league game on 18 October 2020 in a 1-0 victory against Wuhan Zall.

== Career statistics ==
Statistics accurate as of match played 31 December 2022.

Appearances and goals by club, season and competition
Club	Season	League			National Cup		Continental		Other		Total	
Club	Season	Division	Apps	Goals	Apps	Goals	Apps	Goals	Apps	Goals	Apps	Goals!
Chongqing Lifan	2011	China League One	1	0	1	0	–		–		2	0
Chongqing Lifan	2012	China League One	0	0	2	0	–		–		2	0
Chongqing Lifan	2013	China League One	22	0	2	0	–		–		24	0
Chongqing Lifan	2014	China League One	8	0	1	0	–		–		9	0
Chongqing Lifan	2015	Chinese Super League	15	0	2	0	–		–		17	0
Chongqing Lifan	2016	Chinese Super League	13	0	1	0	–		–		14	0
Chongqing Lifan	Total		59	0	9	0	0	0	0	0	68	0
Beijing Renhe	2017	China League One	25	0	0	0	–		–		25	0
Beijing Renhe	2018	Chinese Super League	21	0	2	0	–		–		23	0
Beijing Renhe	2019	Chinese Super League	25	0	0	0	–		–		25	0
Beijing Renhe	Total		71	0	2	0	0	0	0	0	73	0
Henan Jianye/ Henan FC	2020	Chinese Super League	5	1	0	0	–		–		5	1
Henan Jianye/ Henan FC	2021	Chinese Super League	18	0	1	0	–		–		19	0
Henan Jianye/ Henan FC	2022	Chinese Super League	16	0	1	0	–		–		17	0
Henan Jianye/ Henan FC	Total		39	1	2	0	0	0	0	0	41	1
Career total			169	1	13	0	0	0	0	0	182	1

== Honours ==
Chongqing Lifan

- China League One: 2014
