= Chen Jie (footballer) =

Chinese footballer

Chen Jie 陈杰
Personal information
- Date of birth: 15 October 1989 (age 37)
- Place of birth: Jiexi, Guangdong, China
- Height: 1.76 m (5 ft 9 1/2 in)
- Position: Midfielder

Youth career
- 2003–2008: Shandong Luneng

Senior career*
Years	Team	Apps	(Gls)
2008–2009	Shandong Luneng	0	(0)
2008	→ Xinjiang Sport Lottery (loan)	?	(?)
2009	→ Shenzhen Asia Travel (loan)	10	(0)
2010–2019	Beijing Renhe	200	(13)
2020–2022	Chongqing Lifan	32	(0)
2022	Kunshan FC	12	(1)
2023–2024	Meizhou Hakka	41	(1)
2025	Foshan Nanshi	5	(0)
Total		300	(15)
- * Club domestic league appearances and goals

Chen Jie (simplified Chinese: 陈杰; traditional Chinese: 陳杰; pinyin: Chén Jié; born 15 October 1989) is a Chinese former professional footballer who played as a midfielder.

== Club career ==
=== Early career ===
Chen Jie played for the Shandong Luneng football academy and was a key member of the team's consecutive national U-17 champions in 2006 and 2007. He was promoted to the senior side in 2008, however to gain playing time he was loaned out to third-tier club Xinjiang Sport Lottery where he also took part in the football at the 11th Chinese National Games. Upon his return he joined his hometown team Shenzhen Asia Travel in an undisclosed fee from Shandong Luneng in July, 2009 on loan. He made his senior club debut for Shenzhen Asia Travel on 2 August 2009 coming on as a substitute again his former club Shandong Luneng in a 0–0 draw.

=== Guizhou Renhe ===
On 26 January 2010 top-tier side Shaanxi Chanba signed Chen to a permanent deal after being impressed by his potential he showed at Shenzhen Asia Travel. Chen made his league debut for the club against Dalian Shide on September 14, 2011 in a 3–1 defeat where he came on a substitute. As the season progressed he became a regular within the side and scored his first goal for the club on 2 November 2011 against Qingdao Jonoon in a 2–2 draw. At the beginning of the 2012 Chinese Super League season, Shaanxi Channa moved to Guiyang province and Chen joined them as they renamed themselves Guizhou Renhe. He would go on to see the club win the 2013 Chinese FA Cup. Unfortunately he go on to also be part of the team that were relegated at the end of the 2015 Chinese Super League. He would remain loyal towards the club as they relocated to Beijing and helped aid the team to gain promotion back into the top tier at the end of the 2017 China League One campaign.

=== Later career ===
On 31 January 2020 he transferred on a free transfer to another top tier club Chongqing Lifan. He would go on to make his debut in a league game on 26 July 2020 against Beijing Sinobo Guoan in a 2-1 defeat. The club was dissolved on 24 May 2022 after the majority owner, Wuhan Dangdai Group could not restructure the clubs shareholdings and debt. Free to leave he would join second tier club Kunshan FC where would go on to establish himself as regular within the team that won the division and promotion to the top tier at the end of the 2022 China League One campaign.

On 29 January 2026, Chen was given a lifetime ban for match-fixing by the Chinese Football Association.

== Career statistics ==
Appearances and goals by club, season and competition
Club	Season	League			National Cup		Continental		Other		Total	
Club	Season	Division	Apps	Goals	Apps	Goals	Apps	Goals	Apps	Goals	Apps	Goals
Shandong Luneng	2008	Chinese Super League	0	0	-		-		-		0	0
Xinjiang Sport Lottery (loan)	2008	China League Two	?	?	-		-		-		?	?
Shenzhen Asia Travel (loan)	2009	Chinese Super League	10	0	-		-		-		10	0
Shaanxi Renhe/ Guizhou Renhe/ Beijing Renhe	2010	Chinese Super League	0	0	-		-		-		0	0
Shaanxi Renhe/ Guizhou Renhe/ Beijing Renhe	2011	Chinese Super League	10	1	1	0	-		-		11	1
Shaanxi Renhe/ Guizhou Renhe/ Beijing Renhe	2012	Chinese Super League	21	4	7	0	-		-		28	4
Shaanxi Renhe/ Guizhou Renhe/ Beijing Renhe	2013	Chinese Super League	19	0	2	0	4	0	-		25	0
Shaanxi Renhe/ Guizhou Renhe/ Beijing Renhe	2014	Chinese Super League	25	1	2	0	5	0	1 (Note: Appearance in Chinese FA Super Cup)	0	33	1
Shaanxi Renhe/ Guizhou Renhe/ Beijing Renhe	2015	Chinese Super League	27	0	0	0	-		-		27	0
Shaanxi Renhe/ Guizhou Renhe/ Beijing Renhe	2016	China League One	25	2	1	0	-		-		26	2
Shaanxi Renhe/ Guizhou Renhe/ Beijing Renhe	2017	China League One	28	3	0	0	-		-		26	0
Shaanxi Renhe/ Guizhou Renhe/ Beijing Renhe	2018	Chinese Super League	17	0	2	0	-		-		19	0
Shaanxi Renhe/ Guizhou Renhe/ Beijing Renhe	2019	Chinese Super League	28	2	1	0	-		-		29	2
Shaanxi Renhe/ Guizhou Renhe/ Beijing Renhe	Total		200	13	16	0	9	0	1	0	226	13
Chongqing Lifan	2020	Chinese Super League	16	0	0	0	-		-		16	0
Chongqing Lifan	2021	Chinese Super League	16	0	2	0	-		-		18	0
Chongqing Lifan	Total		32	0	2	0	0	0	0	0	34	0
Kunshan FC	2022	China League One	12	1	0	0	-		-		12	1
Meizhou Hakka	2023	Chinese Super League	23	0	0	0	-		-		23	0
Meizhou Hakka	2024	Chinese Super League	18	1	0	0	-		-		18	1
Meizhou Hakka	Total		41	1	0	0	0	0	0	0	41	1
Foshan Nanshi	2025	China League One	5	0	0	0	-		-		5	0
Career total			300	15	18	0	9	0	1	0	328	15

== Honours ==
=== Club ===
Guizhou Renhe

- Chinese FA Cup: 2013
- Chinese FA Super Cup: 2014

Kunshan FC

- China League One: 2022
