= Beijing Fengtai Stadium =

Football stadium in Beijing, China

Coordinates: 39°51′56.50″N 116°16′21.45″E

Beijing Fengtai Stadium 丰台体育场
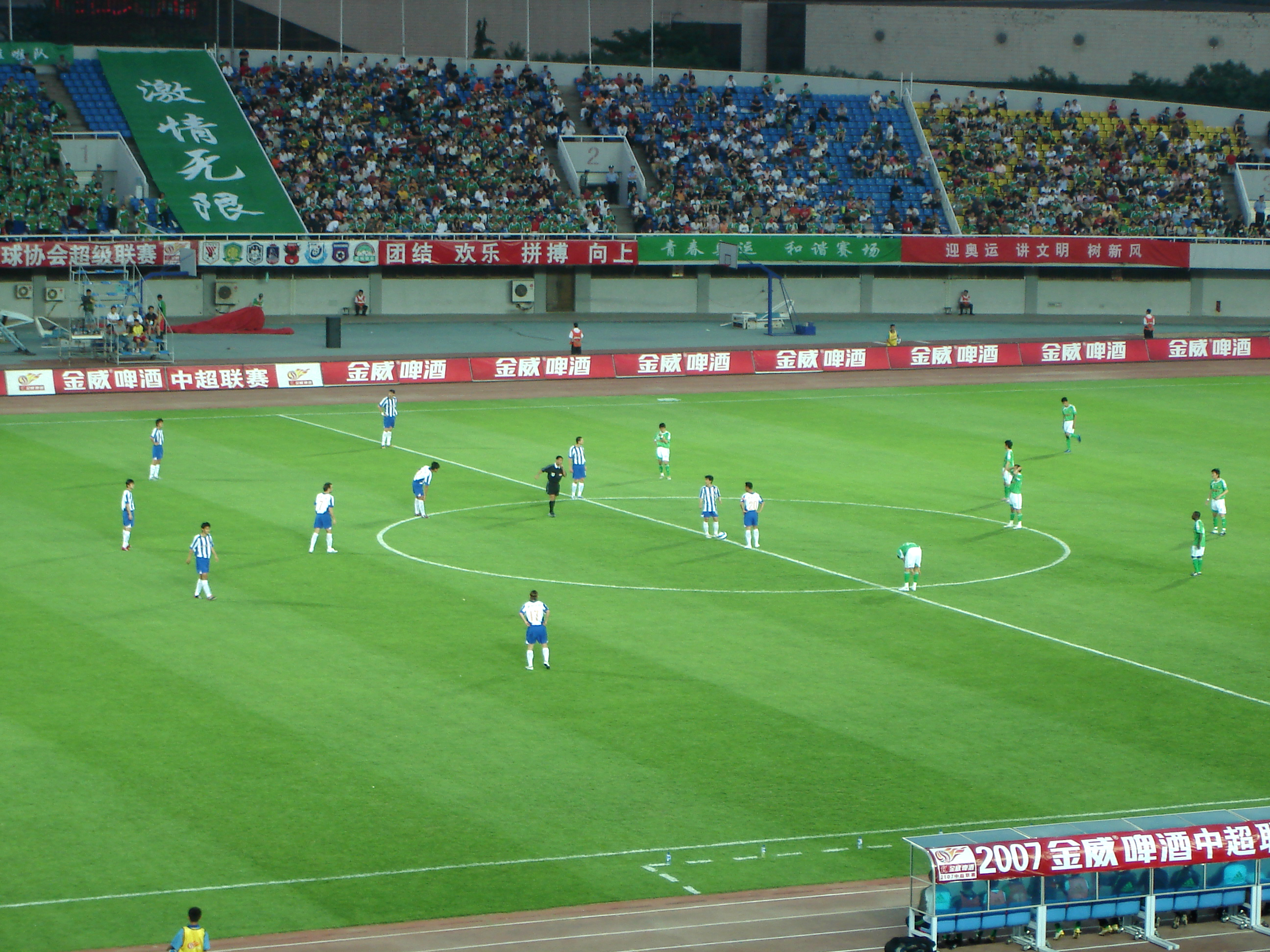
- Beijing Guoan match on Fengtai Stadium (May 2007)
- Interactive map of Beijing Fengtai Stadium 丰台体育场
- Location: Fengtai District, Beijing, China
- Owner: Beijing Sports Bureau
- Capacity: 31,043
- Surface: Grass

Construction
- Opened: 1990

Tenants
- Beijing Guoan F.C.(2006–2008); Beijing Renhe F.C. (2016–2019)

The Beijing Fengtai Stadium (Chinese: 丰台体育场) is a multi-purpose stadium in Fengtai District, Beijing, China. It is currently used mostly for football matches and also sometimes for athletics. The stadium was the home ground of Beijing Renhe between 2016 and 2019. The stadium holds 31,043. The Fengtai Stadium was not used for football during the 2008 Summer Olympics. The venue also served as home ground for Beijing Guoan, the third Chinese sports club with 5 million followers on Weibo after Guangzhou FC and Shandong Taishan, between 2006 and 2008.

Beijing Guoan played against Spanish side FC Barcelona at the Beijing Fengtai Stadium in August 2007.
