= Langfang Stadium =

Multi-use stadium in Langfang, China

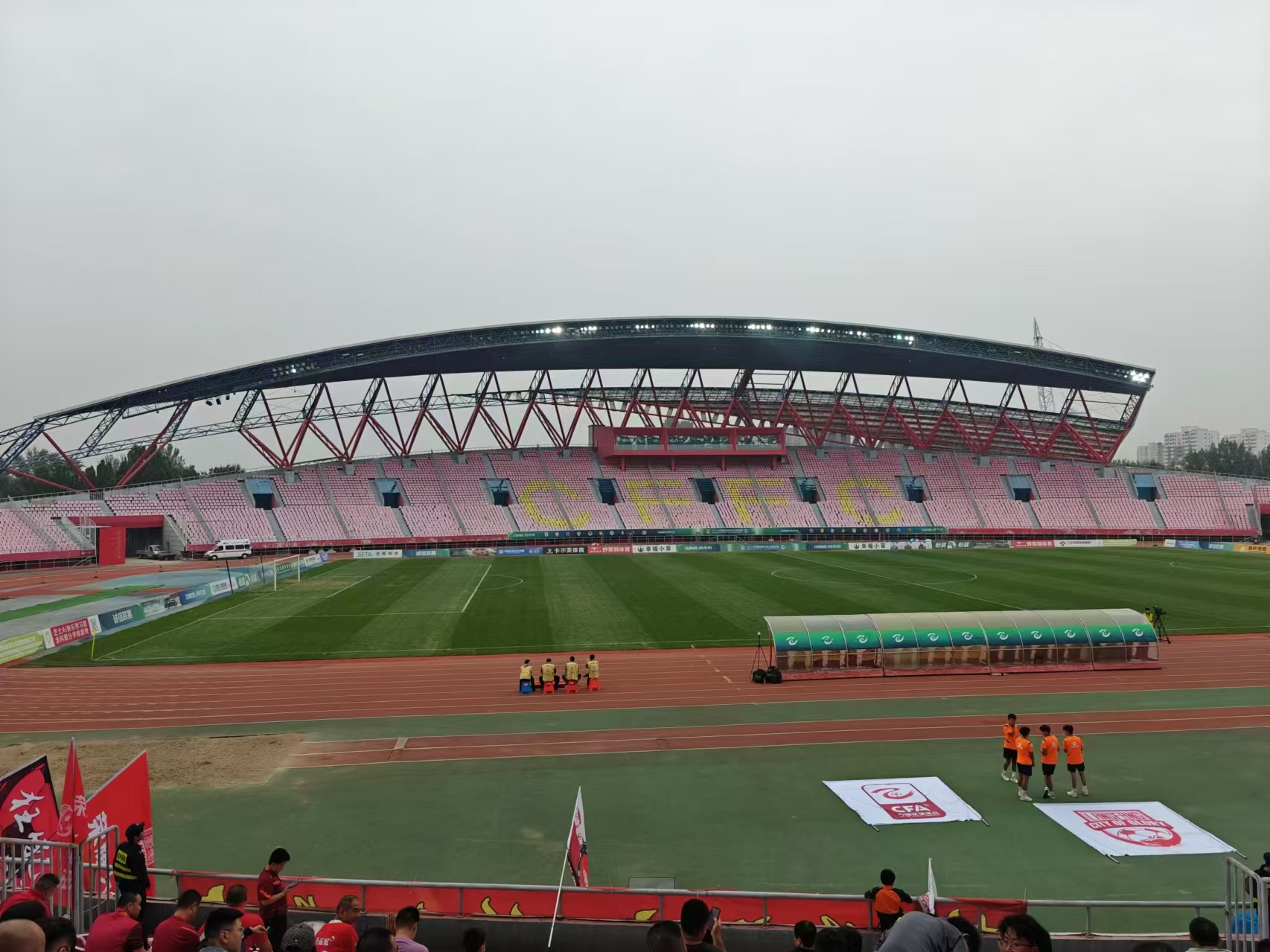
- Interactive map of Langfang Stadium
- Location: Langfang, Hebei, China
- Coordinates: 39°33′14″N 116°43′16″E
- Capacity: 30,040

Tenants
- Hebei (2018–2022); Langfang Glory City (2023–present)

Langfang Stadium (Simplified Chinese: 廊坊体育场) is a multi-use stadium in Langfang, China. It is currently used mostly for football matches and athletics events. The stadium has a capacity of 30,040 people. Hebei F.C. used the stadium for home games until 2022. Today, it hosts the home games of Langfang Glory City.
