= Jiang Wenjun =

Chinese footballer

Jiang Wenjun 姜文骏
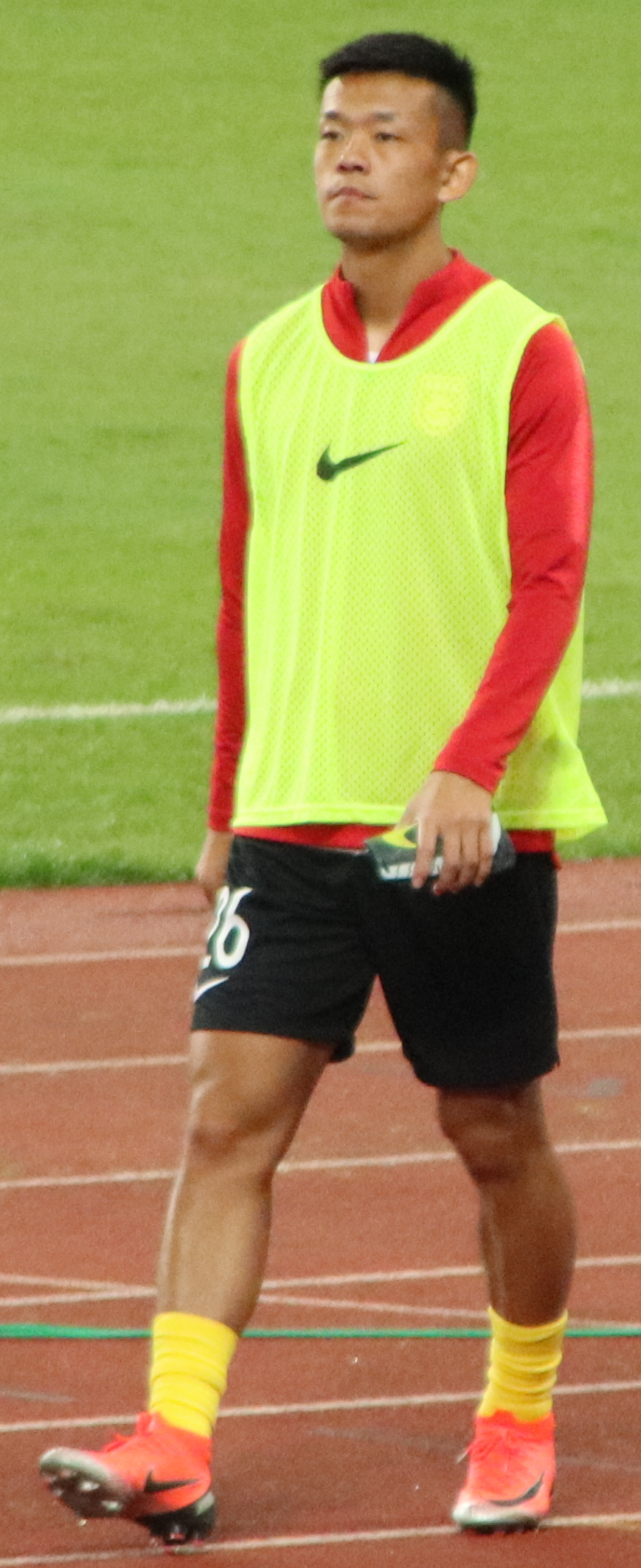

Personal information
- Date of birth: 30 January 1990 (age 36)
- Place of birth: Dalian, Liaoning, China
- Height: 1.80 m (5 ft 11 in)
- Position: Left-back

Senior career*
| Years | Team | Apps | (Gls) |
| 2007–2010 | Shanghai Zobon | 21 | (0) |
| 2011–2012 | Dalian Aerbin | 1 | (0) |
| 2013–2014 | Qingdao Hainiu | 42 | (0) |
| 2015–2021 | Hebei FC | 47 | (0) |
| 2022 | Kunshan FC | 0 | (0) |
- * Club domestic league appearances and goals as of 24 December 2022

Jiang Wenjun (Chinese: 姜文骏; born 30 January 1990) is a Chinese footballer who plays as a left-back.

== Club career ==
Jiang Wenjun started his professional career with China League One side Shanghai Zobon in 2007. He would gradually start to establish himself within the team before he transferred to China League One side Dalian Aerbin on 9 March 2011, on a free transfer. He would be part of the team that won promotion to the top tier at the 2011 China League One campaign. On 11 March 2012, Jiang made his top tier debut for Dalian Aerbin in the 2012 Chinese Super League against Tianjin Teda in a 1-0 defeat.

In March 2013, Jiang moved to China League Two side Qingdao Hainiu. He would establish himself as a vital member of the team that went on to win the division and promotion to the second tier. Jiang joined Hebei China Fortune in 2015, initially joining the reserve team he was promoted to the first team in the summer of 2016. He made his debut for Hebei on 29 June 2016 in the fourth round of 2016 Chinese FA Cup against Shijiazhuang Ever Bright with a 3–2 win. After several season with Hebei he join second tier club Kunshan and was part of the squad that won the division and promotion to the top tier at the end of the 2022 China League One campaign.

== Career statistics ==
As of 24 December 2022.

Appearances and goals by club, season and competition
| Club | Season | League | | | National Cup | | Continental | | Other | | Total | |
| Club | Season | Division | Apps | Goals | Apps | Goals | Apps | Goals | Apps | Goals | Apps | Goals |
|---|---|---|---|---|---|---|---|---|---|---|---|---|
| Shanghai Zobon | 2007 | China League One | 4 | 0 | - | | - | | - | | 4 | 0 |
| Shanghai Zobon | 2008 | China League One | 5 | 0 | - | | - | | - | | 5 | 0 |
| Shanghai Zobon | 2009 | China League One | 0 | 0 | - | | - | | - | | 0 | 0 |
| Shanghai Zobon | 2010 | China League One | 12 | 0 | - | | - | | - | | 12 | 0 |
| Shanghai Zobon | Total | | 21 | 0 | 0 | 0 | 0 | 0 | 0 | 0 | 21 | 0 |
| Dalian Aerbin | 2011 | China League One | 1 | 0 | 1 | 0 | - | | - | | 2 | 0 |
| Dalian Aerbin | 2012 | Chinese Super League | 1 | 0 | 0 | 0 | - | | - | | 1 | 0 |
| Dalian Aerbin | Total | | 2 | 0 | 1 | 0 | 0 | 0 | 0 | 0 | 3 | 0 |
| Qingdao Hainiu | 2013 | China League Two | 16 | 0 | - | | - | | - | | 16 | 0 |
| Qingdao Hainiu | 2014 | China League One | 26 | 0 | 4 | 0 | - | | - | | 30 | 0 |
| Qingdao Hainiu | Total | | 42 | 0 | 4 | 0 | 0 | 0 | 0 | 0 | 46 | 0 |
| Hebei China Fortune | 2015 | China League One | 0 | 0 | 0 | 0 | - | | - | | 0 | 0 |
| Hebei China Fortune | 2016 | Chinese Super League | 1 | 0 | 3 | 0 | - | | - | | 4 | 0 |
| Hebei China Fortune | 2017 | Chinese Super League | 16 | 0 | 1 | 0 | - | | - | | 17 | 0 |
| Hebei China Fortune | 2018 | Chinese Super League | 6 | 0 | 0 | 0 | - | | - | | 6 | 0 |
| Hebei China Fortune | 2019 | Chinese Super League | 15 | 0 | 1 | 0 | - | | - | | 16 | 0 |
| Hebei China Fortune | 2020 | Chinese Super League | 7 | 0 | 1 | 0 | - | | - | | 8 | 0 |
| Hebei China Fortune | 2021 | Chinese Super League | 2 | 0 | 1 | 0 | - | | - | | 3 | 0 |
| Hebei China Fortune | Total | | 47 | 0 | 7 | 0 | 0 | 0 | 0 | 0 | 54 | 0 |
| Kunshan | 2022 | China League One | 0 | 0 | 0 | 0 | - | | - | | 0 | 0 |
| Career total | | | 112 | 0 | 12 | 0 | 0 | 0 | 0 | 0 | 124 | 0 |

== Honours ==
=== Club ===
Dalian Aerbin

- China League One: 2011

Qingdao Hainiu

- China League Two: 2013

Kunshan

- China League One: 2022
