= Nizamdin Ependi =

Chinese footballer

Personal information
- Full name: Nizamdin Ependi
- Date of birth: 23 April 1991 (age 35)
- Place of birth: Artux, Xinjiang, China
- Height: 1.73 m (5 ft 8 in)
- Positions: Winger; full-back

Youth career
- Xinjiang Youth
- Xinjiang University

Senior career*
Years	Team	Apps	(Gls)
2016–2017	Nei Mongol Zhongyou	54	(3)
2018–2020	Beijing Renhe	55	(1)
2021	Heilongjiang Ice City	22	(1)
2022–2025	Shenzhen Peng City	67	(0)
2025	→ Jiangxi Dingnan United (loan)	28	(0)
2026	Jiangxi Dingnan United	7	(0)
- * Club domestic league appearances and goals as of 8 March 2026

Nizamdin Ependi (Chinese: 尼扎木丁·阿凡提; born 23 April 1991) is a Chinese former footballer who played as midfielder and full-back.

== Club career ==
Nizamdin graduated with a degree in law at Xinjiang University before he signed his first professional contract at the age of 25 in 2016 after making a positive impression in a trial with China League One side Nei Mongol Zhongyou. On 12 March 2017, he made his senior debut in a 1–0 away defeat against Qingdao Jonoon. He scored his first senior goal on 12 April 2016 in a 1–0 away win over third-tier club Meixian Techand in the second round of 2016 Chinese FA Cup. Nizamdin scored his first league goal on 25 June 2016 in a 3–0 home win against Shenzhen FC. Nizamdin played two season for Nei Mongol Zhongyou, scoring four goals in 59 appearances.

Nizamdin transferred to Chinese Super League newcomer Beijing Renhe on 28 February 2018. On 10 March 2018, he made his debut for the club in a 2–1 away win against Tianjin Quanjian, coming on as a substitute for Cao Yongjing in the 84th minute.

On 24 March 2022, Nizamdin transferred to China League One club Sichuan Jiuniu.

On 21 May 2026, Nizamdin was given a 5-year ban for match-fixing by the Chinese Football Association.

== Career statistics ==
As of 31 December 2022.

Appearances and goals by club, season and competition
Club	Season	League			National Cup		Continental		Other		Total	
Club	Season	Division	Apps	Goals	Apps	Goals	Apps	Goals	Apps	Goals	Apps	Goals
Nei Mongol Zhongyou	2016	China League One	27	2	2	1	-		-		29	3
Nei Mongol Zhongyou	2017	China League One	27	1	3	0	-		-		30	1
Nei Mongol Zhongyou	Total		54	3	5	1	0	0	0	0	59	4
Beijing Renhe	2018	Chinese Super League	17	0	2	0	-		-		19	0
Beijing Renhe	2019	Chinese Super League	24	0	2	0	-		-		26	0
Beijing Renhe	2020	China League One	14	1	-		-		2 (Note: Appearances in China League One relegation play-offs)	0	16	1
Beijing Renhe	Total		55	1	4	0	0	0	2	0	61	0
Heilongjiang Ice City	2021	China League One	22	1	0	0	-		-		22	1
Sichuan Jiuniu	2022	China League One	22	0	0	0	-		-		22	0
Career total			153	5	9	1	0	0	2	0	164	6
