= 2025 Chengdu Rongcheng F.C. season =

- Owner: Chengdu Better City Investment Group Co., Ltd.
- Chairman: Li Mingqin
- Head coach: Seo Jung-won
- Stadium: Phoenix Hill Football Stadium, Chengdu, Sichuan
- Super League: 3rd
- FA Cup: Semi-finals
- AFC Champions League Elite: League stage
- Average home league attendance: 40,820
Home colours	Away colours

The 2025 Chengdu Rongcheng season was Chengdu Rongcheng's 4th season in the Chinese Super League and 8th overall in its existence. They also compete in the Chinese FA Cup, and the 2025–26 AFC Champions League Elite.

== Squad ==
As of 24 Feb 2025

No.	Name	Nationality	Date of birth (age)	Previous club	Contract since	Contract end
Goalkeepers
1	Jian Tao	(China)	22 June 2001 (age 24)	(France) Villefranche Beaujolais	2023	
14	Ran Weifeng	(China)	18 April 2002 (age 23)	(China) Dalian K'un City	2022	
32	Liu Dianzuo	(China)	26 June 1990 (age 35)	(China) Wuhan Three Towns	2025	
Defenders
2	Hu Hetao	(China)	5 October 2003 (age 22)	Youth Team	2022	
3	Tang Xin	(China)	16 October 1990 (age 35)	(China) Guizhou	2021	
5	Timo Letschert	(Netherlands)	25 May 1993 (age 32)	(South Korea) Gwangju FC	2024	
11	Yahav Gurfinkel	(Israel)	27 June 1998 (age 27)	(Israel) Hapoel Tel Aviv	2024	
17	Wang Dongsheng	(China)	12 May 1997 (age 28)	(China) Zhejiang	2025	
18	Han Pengfei	(China)	28 April 1993 (age 32)	(China) Tianjin Jinmen Tiger	2025	
19	Dong Yanfeng	(China)	11 February 1996 (age 30)	(China) Dalian Professional	2023	
22	Li Yang	(China)	22 July 1997 (age 28)	(China) Wuhan Three Towns	2023	
26	Yuan Mincheng	(China)	8 August 1995 (age 30)	(China) Changchun Yatai	2025	
28	Yang Shuai	(China)	28 January 1997 (age 29)	(China) Henan	2024	
Midfielders
4	Pedro Delgado	(China) (Portugal)	7 April 1997 (age 28)	(China) Shandong Taishan	2025	
8	Tim Chow	(Chinese Taipei) (England)	18 January 1994 (age 32)	(China) Henan	2022	
10	Rômulo	(Brazil)	27 October 1995 (age 30)	(South Korea) Busan IPark	2021	
15	Yan Dinghao	(China)	6 April 1998 (age 27)	(China) Wuhan Three Towns	2024	
16	Yang Mingyang	(China) (Switzerland)	11 July 1995 (age 30)	(Switzerland) Nantong Zhiyun	2025	
25	Mirahmetjan Muzepper	(China)	14 January 1991 (age 35)	(China) Shanghai Port	2024	
39	Gan Chao	(China)	13 February 1995 (age 31)	(China) Shenzhen	2024	
48	Li Moyu	(China)	8 April 2005 (age 20)	Youth Team	2025	
Strikers
7	Wei Shihao	(China)	8 April 1995 (age 30)	(China) Wuhan Three Towns	2024	
9	Felipe	(Brazil)	3 April 1992 (age 33)	(South Korea) Gwangju FC	2021	
24	Tang Chuang	(China)	30 April 1996 (age 29)	(China) Suzhou Dongwu	2024	
47	Issa Kallon	(Sierra Leone) (Netherlands)	3 January 1996 (age 30)	(Switzerland) Nantong Zhiyun	2025	
Players let permanently
20	Tang Miao	(China)	16 October 1990 (age 35)	(China) Guangzhou City	2023	
Players on loan
6	Feng Zhuoyi	(China)	18 June 1989 (age 36)	(China) Henan	2020	
23	Liao Lisheng	(China)	29 April 1993 (age 32)	(China) Shandong Taishan	2025	
29	Mutellip Iminqari	(China)	18 March 2004 (age 21)	Youth Team	2022	

== Transfer ==
=== In ===
Pre-Season

Position	Player	Transferred from	Ref
GK	(China) Liu Dianzuo	(China) Wuhan Three Towns	Free
DF	(China) Wang Dongsheng	(China) Zhejiang	Free
DF	(China) Han Pengfei	(China) Tianjin Jinmen Tiger	Free
DF	(China) Yuan Mincheng	(China) Changchun Yatai	Free
MF	(China) (Switzerland) Yang Mingyang	(China) Nantong Zhiyun	Free
MF	(China) (Portugal) Pedro Delgado	(China) Shandong Taishan	Season loan
MF	(China) Liao Lisheng	(China) Shandong Taishan	Free
FW	(Sierra Leone) (Netherlands) Issa Kallon	(China) Nantong Zhiyun	Free

=== Out ===
Pre-Season

Position	Player	Transferred from	Ref
GK	(China) Geng Xiaofeng	(China) Yunnan Yukun	Free
DF	(China) Chen Guoliang	(China) Guangdong GZ-Power	Free
DF	(China) Yang Fan	(China) Tianjin Jinmen Tiger	Free
DF	(China) Yang Yiming	(China) Shenzhen Peng City	Free
DF	(China) Liu Tao	(China) Suzhou Dongwu	Free
MF	(Colombia) Manuel Palacios	(China) Wuhan Three Towns	Free
FW	(China) Bughrahan Iskandar	(China) Qingdao Red Lions	Free

Mid-Season

Position	Player	Transferred from	Ref
DF	(China) Tang Miao	(China) Yunnan Yukun	Free
MF	(China) Feng Zhuoyi	(China) Shijiazhuang Gongfu	Season loan
MF	(China) Liao Lisheng	(China) Shenzhen Peng City	Season loan
MF	(China) Mutellip Iminqari	(China) Qingdao West Coast	Season loan

== Friendlies ==
=== Pre-Season Friendly ===
Win Draw Loss

16 January 2025 1	Chengdu Rongcheng (China)	0–0	(China) Tianjin Jinmen Tiger	Haikou, China
				Stadium: Mission Hills Football Base Stadium

22 January 2025 2	FK Auda (Latvia)	1–2	(China) Chengdu Rongcheng	Abu Dhabi, UAE
				Stadium: ERTH Abu Dhabi Football Field

25 January 2025 3	FC Krasnodar (Russia)	1–1	(China) Chengdu Rongcheng	Abu Dhabi, UAE
				Stadium: Zayed Cricket Stadium Pitch 5

5 February 2025 4	FC Akron Tolyatti (Russia)	3–1	(China) Chengdu Rongcheng	Dubai, UAE
				Stadium: Jebel Ali Centre of Excellence

== Statistics ==
=== Appearances and goals ===
As of 9 Dec 2025

No.	Nat.	Name	Chinese Super League		Chinese FA Cup		2025–26 AFC Champions League		Total	
No.	Nat.	Name	Apps.	Goals	Apps.	Goals	Apps.	Goals	Apps.	Goals
1	GK	(China) Jian Tao	3	0	0	0	5	0	8	0
2	DF	(China) Hu Hetao	19+2	1	0+2	0	6	0	29	1
3	DF	(China) Tang Xin	1	0	1	0	0	0	2	0
4	MF	(China) (Portugal) Pedro Delgado	9+10	3	1	0	3+2	1	25	4
5	DF	(Netherlands) Timo Letschert	26+2	5	2	0	5+1	0	36	5
7	FW	(China) Wei Shihao	21+3	10	3+1	2	2+1	0	31	12
8	MF	(Chinese Taipei) (England) Tim Chow	27	5	3+1	1	7	0	38	6
9	FW	(Brazil) Felipe	29+1	15	2+2	0	6+1	5	41	20
10	MF	(Brazil) Rômulo	27+2	8	2+1	3	6	0	38	11
11	DF	(Israel) Yahav Gurfinkel	27+1	2	3	0	6+1	0	38	2
14	GK	(China) Ran Weifeng	0	0	0	0	0	0	0	0
15	MF	(China) Yan Dinghao	10+12	2	2+1	1	1+3	0	29	2
16	MF	(China) (Switzerland) Yang Mingyang	22+4	3	2+1	0	6+1	1	37	4
17	DF	(China) Wang Dongsheng	5+8	0	2+1	1	1+1	0	18	1
18	DF	(China) Han Pengfei	6+4	0	2	0	1	0	13	0
19	DF	(China) Dong Yanfeng	4+6	0	1	0	4+3	0	18	0
22	DF	(China) Li Yang	23+6	0	2+1	0	6	0	38	0
24	FW	(China) Tang Chuang	0+1	0	1	0	0+2	0	4	0
25	MF	(China) Mirahmetjan Muzepper	1+5	0	1+2	0	0+1	0	10	0
26	DF	(China) Yuan Mincheng	21+3	2	3	0	2+3	0	32	2
28	DF	(China) Yang Shuai	9+6	0	2+2	0	2+1	0	22	0
32	GK	(China) Liu Dianzuo	26	0	4	0	2	0	32	0
39	DF	(China) Gan Chao	8+13	1	3+1	0	3+3	0	31	1
47	FW	(Sierra Leone) (Netherlands) Issa Kallon	1+4	0	0	0	0	0	5	0
48	MF	(China) Li Moyu	0+10	1	0+1	0	0+2	0	13	1
49	MF	(China) Xu Hong	0	0	0	0	1	0	1	0
58	MF	(China) Liao Rongxiang	2+9	1	1+1	0	2+5	0	20	1
Players who have played this season and/or sign for the season but had left the club or on loan to other club
6	MF	(China) Feng Zhuoyi	0	0	0	0	0	0	0	0
23	MF	(China) Liao Lisheng	1+3	0	0	0	0	0	4	0
29	MF	(China) Mutellip Iminqari	0+1	0	1	0	0	0	2	0
Players who have played this season and/or sign for the season but had left the club permanently
20	DF	(China) Tang Miao	1+2	0	0	0	0	0	3	0

== Competitions ==
=== Chinese Super League ===
22 March 2025 1	Chengdu Rongcheng	1–0	Wuhan Three Towns	Chengdu
	Felipe 59'; Shuang Yang (yellow card) 8'; Wei Shihao (yellow card) 85'		Park Ji-soo (yellow card) 21'; Gustavo Sauer (yellow card) 48'; Liu Yi Ming (yellow card) 53'; Liu Yi Heng (yellow card) 53'; Shao Puliang (yellow card) 58'; He Guan (yellow card) 87'	Stadium: Phoenix Hill Football Stadium; Referee: Shen Yinhao

2 March 2025 2	Chengdu Rongcheng	1–2	Tianjin Jinmen Tiger	Chengdu
	Wei Shihao 25'; Tim Chow (red card) 45+6'; Yahav Gurfinkel (yellow card) 90+3'; Yao Zi Chao (yellow card) 90+5'		Wang Qiuming 12'; Albion Ademi 59'; Dun Ba (yellow card) 67'; Sung Ming Him (yellow card) 80'; Juan Antonio Ros (yellow card) 88'; Fang Jing Qi (yellow card) 90+3'; Romulo (yellow card) 90+5'	Stadium: Phoenix Hill Football Stadium; Referee: Gan Shuran

29 March 2025 3	Beijing Guoan	1–1	Chengdu Rongcheng	Beijing
	Spajić (yellow card) 5'; Abreu 18' (pen.); Ngadeu (red card) 67'; Zhang Yuning (yellow card) 84'		Yuan Mincheng (yellow card) 12'; Pedro Delgado (yellow card) 17'; Yang Mingyang (yellow card) 20'; Felipe 78'	Stadium: Workers' Stadium; Attendance: 52,982; Referee: Ma Ning

2 April 2025 4	Shandong Taishan	0–3	Chengdu Rongcheng	Jinan
	Liu Yang (yellow card) 22' (yellow-red card); Peng Xinli (yellow card) 23'; Xie Wenneng (yellow card) 37'; Crysan (yellow card) 42'		Yuan Mincheng 5'; Rômulo 45+3'; Felipe 68'; Yahav Gurfinkel (yellow card) 27'; Tim Chow (yellow card) 55'; Yang Dinghao (yellow card) 60'	Stadium: Jinan Olympic Sports Center Stadium; Referee: Memetjan Ahmat

6 April 2025 5	Chengdu Rongcheng	2–0	Dalian Yingbo	Chengdu
	Yahav Gurfinkel 39'; Hu Hetao 57'; Yan Dinghao (yellow card) 19'		Song Yue (yellow card) 26' (yellow-red card); Zhu Pengyu (yellow card) 32'; Yang Mingrui (yellow card) 34'; Sun Bo (yellow card) 34'	Stadium: Phoenix Hill Football Stadium; Referee: Wang Jing

12 April 2025 6	Qingdao Hainiu	0–1	Chengdu Rongcheng	Qingdao
	Liu Jiashen (yellow card) 28'; Wellington Silva (yellow card) 53'; Shao Yibo (yellow card) 66'		Pedro Delgado 30'; Liu Dianzuo (yellow card) 90+8'	Stadium: Qingdao Youth Football Stadium; Referee: Zhang Lei

16 April 2025 7	Chengdu Rongcheng	1–1	Yunnan Yukun	Chengdu
	Tim Chow 42'; Felipe (penalty missed) 52; Moyu Li (yellow card) 77'; Wang Dongsheng (yellow card) 78'		John Hou Sæter 90+5'; Yi Teng (yellow card) 32'; Ye Chugui (yellow card) 84'	Stadium: Phoenix Hill Football Stadium; Referee: Ai Kun

20 April 2025 8	Shanghai Port	1–3	Chengdu Rongcheng	Shanghai
	Gustavo 31'; Wei Zhen (yellow card) 8'; Umidjan Yusup (yellow card) 28'; Li Shuai (yellow card) 56'; Yan Junling (yellow card) 66'		Rômulo (footballer, born October 1995)	Stadium: Shanghai Stadium; Attendance: 23,785; Referee: Li Hai Xin

26 April 2025 9	Changchun Yatai	1–2	Chengdu Rongcheng	Changchun
	Zhang Huachen (yellow card) 34'; Robert Berić 53'		Yuan Mincheng 5'; Wei Shihao 50'; Timo Letschert (yellow card) 61'	Stadium: Changchun Stadium; Referee: Huang Yi

2 May 2025 10	Chengdu Rongcheng	1–0	Shanghai Shenhua	Chengdu
	Rômulo 27' (yellow card) 19'; Wei Shihao (yellow card) 21'; Yuan Mincheng (yellow card) 45+6'; Li Yang (yellow card) 54'; Liu Dianzuo (yellow card) 90+5'		Wu Xi (yellow card) 53'; João Carlos Teixeira (yellow card) 53' (yellow-red card)	Stadium: Phoenix Hill Football Stadium; Referee: Memetjan Ahmat

5 May 2025 11	Chengdu Rongcheng	2–1	Zhejiang	Chengdu
	Yang Mingyang 32'; Wei Shihao 55'; Li Yang (yellow card) 52'		Jean Evrard Kouassi 90+7' (pen.); Wang Yudong (yellow card) 45'; Liu Haofan (yellow card) 80'	Stadium: Phoenix Hill Football Stadium; Referee: He Kai

10 May 2025 12	Meizhou Hakka	0–4	Chengdu Rongcheng	Wuhua
	Tian Ziyi (yellow card) 10'; Dong Yanfeng (yellow card) 45'; Hu Hetao (yellow card) 56'		Yang Mingyang 9' (yellow card) 69'; Wei Shihao 27'; Rômulo 31'; Timo Letschert 59'; Dong Yanfeng (yellow card) 45'; Rao Weihui (yellow card) 54'; Tim Chow (yellow card) 69'	Stadium: Huitang Stadium; Referee: Ai Kun

17 May 2025 13	Chengdu Rongcheng	1–1	Qingdao West Coast	Chengdu
	Felipe de Sousa Silva 15'; Rômulo (penalty missed) 39; Wei Shihao (yellow card) 7'; Hu Hetao (yellow card) 22' (yellow-red card); Tim Chow (yellow card) 74'		Abdul-Aziz Yakubu 23' (yellow card) 74'; Matheus Índio (yellow card) 9'; Alex Yang (yellow card) 53'; Davidson (yellow card) 68'	Stadium: Phoenix Hill Football Stadium; Referee: Ma Ning

14 June 2025 14	Henan	3–2	Chengdu Rongcheng	Zhengzhou
	Felippe Cardoso 15'; Huang Zichang 27'; Frank Acheampong 69'; Bruno Nazário (yellow card) 31'; Lucas Maia (yellow card) 39'; Huang Ruifeng (yellow card) 85'; Wang Guoming (yellow card) 90+5'		Wei Shihao 7'; Felipe de Sousa Silva 21'; Yuan Mincheng (yellow card) 13'; Ming-yang Yang (yellow card) 61'	Stadium: Hanghai Stadium; Referee: Dai Yige

25 June 2025 15	Chengdu Rongcheng	5–0	Shenzhen Peng City	Chengdu
	Wei Shihao 9'; Yan Dinghao 16'; Rômulo 62'; Pedro Delgado 75'; Tim Chow 83' (pen.)		Qiao Wang (yellow card) 59'	Stadium: Phoenix Hill Football Stadium

29 June 2025 16	Wuhan Three Towns	2–2	Chengdu Rongcheng	Wuhan
	Alexandru Tudorie 15' (yellow card) 90+9'; Gustavo Sauer 75'; He Guan (yellow card) 3'; Zheng Haoqian (yellow card) 67'; Park Ji-soo (yellow card) 82'; Chen Xing (yellow card) 90+5'		Alexandru Tudorie 40' (o.g.); Wei Shihao 81' (pen.); Li Yang (yellow card) 86'; Wang Dongsheng (yellow card) 90+7'	Stadium: Wuhan Sports Center

18 July 2025 17	Tianjin Jinmen Tiger	2–1	Chengdu Rongcheng	Tianjin
	Wang Qiuming 53'; Albion Ademi 65' (pen.)		Wei Shihao 89' (pen.) (yellow card) 86' (yellow-red card) 90+2'; Tim Chow (yellow card) 90+2'	Stadium: TEDA Soccer Stadium

26 July 2025 18	Chengdu Rongcheng	2–0	Beijing Guoan	Chengdu
	Pedro Delgado 33'; Timo Letschert 66'		Wang Gang (yellow card) 90+6'	Stadium: Phoenix Hill Football Stadium

2 August 2025 19	Chengdu Rongcheng	2–1	Shandong Taishan	Chengdu
	Felipe de Sousa Silva 28', 66'		Valeri Qazaishvili 31'; Liu Yang (yellow card) 23'; Wang Dalei (red card) 59'	Stadium: Phoenix Hill Football Stadium

8 August 2025 20	Dalian Yingbo	0–2	Chengdu Rongcheng	Dalian
	Lü Zhuoyi (yellow card) 39'; Liao Jintao (yellow card) 49'; Song Yue (yellow card) 81'		Felipe de Sousa Silva 77'; Gan Chao 90+8' (yellow card) 69'; Yan Dinghao (yellow card) 41'; Yuan Mincheng (yellow card) 59' (yellow-red card) 90+4'; Ming-yang Yang (yellow card) 63'; Yahav Gurfinkel (yellow card) 85'	Stadium: Dalian Suoyuwan Football Stadium

16 August 2025 21	Chengdu Rongcheng	0–0	Qingdao Hainiu	Chengdu
	Yang Mingyang (yellow card) 72'; Tim Chow (yellow card) 86'		Che Shiwei (yellow card) 90+4'	Stadium: Phoenix Hill Football Stadium

23 August 2025 22	Yunnan Yukun	1–5	Chengdu Rongcheng	Yuxi
	John Hou Sæter 32'; Zhao Yuhao (yellow card) 85'		Tim Chow 12' (yellow card) 12'; Felipe de Sousa Silva 54', 63'; Liao Rongxiang 78' (yellow card) 78'; Li Moyu 88'	Stadium: Yuxi Plateau Sports Center Stadium

30 August 2025 23	Chengdu Rongcheng	4–1	Shanghai Port	Chengdu
	Yahav Gurfinkel 13' (yellow card) 72'; Felipe de Sousa Silva 20', 30' (pen.); Timo Letschert 59'		Li Shuai 35'; Yang Shiyuan (yellow card) 29'; Liu Ruofan (yellow card) 50'; Óscar Melendo (yellow card) 63'; Tyias Browning (yellow card) 87'	Stadium: Phoenix Hill Football Stadium

12 September 2025 24	Chengdu Rongcheng	1–0	Changchun Yatai	Chengdu
	Wei Shihao 5'; Wang Dongsheng (red card) 81'; Yuan Mincheng (yellow card) 69'		Xu Haofeng (yellow card) 23'; Zhao Yingjie (yellow card) 45+4'	Stadium: Phoenix Hill Football Stadium

21 September 2025 25	Shanghai Shenhua	1–1	Chengdu Rongcheng	Shanghai
	Shinichi Chan 68'; Liu Chengyu (yellow card) 2'; Hu Hetao (yellow card) 65'; Wei Shihao (yellow card) 81'		Tim Chow 90+9'; Felipe de Sousa Silva (yellow card) 90+8'; Tang Chuang (yellow card) 90+11'; Rômulo (yellow card) 90+12'	Stadium: Shanghai Stadium

26 September 2025 26	Zhejiang	3–3	Chengdu Rongcheng	Hangzhou
	Deabeas Owusu-Sekyere 45'; Yago Cariello 45+10', 90+10' (yellow card) 90+11'; Zhang Jiaqi (yellow card) 70'		Rômulo 29', 37'; Tim Chow 39' (yellow card) 45+8'; Liao Rongxiang (yellow card) 66'; Felipe de Sousa Silva (yellow card) 84'; Yahav Gurfinkel (yellow card) 90+8'	Stadium: Huanglong Sports Center Stadium

17 October 2025 27	Chengdu Rongcheng	3–1	Meizhou Hakka	Chengdu
	Yang Mingyang 17'; Timo Letschert 70'; Rômulo 82'		Rodrigo Henrique 25'; Yubiao Deng (yellow card) 66'	Stadium: Phoenix Hill Football Stadium

26 October 2025 28	Qingdao West Coast	2–2	Chengdu Rongcheng	Qingdao
	Davidson da Luz Pereira 30', 57' (yellow card) 90+5'; Chen Po-liang (yellow card) 45+6'; Alex Yang (yellow card) 69'; Li Hao (yellow card) 90+8'		Ming-yang Yang (yellow card) 6'; Felipe de Sousa Silva 68', 90+10'; Yuan Mincheng (yellow card) 90'; Tim Chow (yellow card) 90+7'	Stadium: Qingdao West Coast University City Sports Center

31 October 2025 29	Chengdu Rongcheng	1–2	Henan	Chengdu
	Yan Dinghao 21'; Tim Chow (yellow card) 64'		Zhong Yihao 46'; He Chao 83' (yellow card) 88'; Oliver Gerbig (yellow card) 17'; Liu Yixin (yellow card) 31'; Huang Ruifeng (yellow card) 76'	Stadium: Phoenix Hill Football Stadium

22 November 2025 30	Shenzhen Peng City	1–1	Chengdu Rongcheng	Shenzhen
	Matt Orr 1'; Eden Kartsev (yellow card) 81'; Zhang Xiaobin (yellow card) 90+5'		Felipe de Sousa Silva 19'; Ming-yang Yang (yellow card) 45+5'; Liao Rongxiang (yellow card) 90+6'	Stadium: Shenzhen Sports Center Stadium

Pos	Team	Pld	W	D	L	GF	GA	GD	Pts	Qualification or relegation
1	Shanghai Port (C)	30	20	6	4	72	44	+28	66	Qualification for AFC Champions League Elite league stage
2	Shanghai Shenhua	30	19	7	4	67	35	+32	64	Qualification for AFC Champions League Two group stage
3	Chengdu Rongcheng	30	17	9	4	60	28	+32	60	
4	Beijing Guoan	30	17	6	7	69	46	+23	57	Qualification for AFC Champions League Elite qualifying play-offs (Note: As Chinese FA Cup winners.)
5	Shandong Taishan	30	15	8	7	69	46	+23	53	

Source: Soccerway
Rules for classification:
- During season: 1) Points; 2) Head-to-head points; 3) Head-to-head goal difference; 4) Head-to-head goals scored; 5) Goal difference; 6) Goals scored; 7) Rankings in the previous season. (Rules 2 to 4 are only applied when teams concerned have finished both/all the matches against others.)
- After season: 1) Points; 2) Head-to-head points; 3) Head-to-head goal difference; 4) Head-to-head goals scored; 5) Goal difference; 6) Goals scored; 7) Disciplinary points (yellow card = 1 point, red card = 3 points); 8) Drawing of lots.
  (C) Champions
  Notes:

=== Chinese FA Cup ===
21 May 2025 3rd Round	(2) Guangxi Pingguo	0–3	Chengdu Rongcheng	Pingguo
	Yao Diran (yellow card) 23'; Chen Quanjiang (yellow card) 73'		Wang Dongsheng 14'; Yan Dinghao 64'; Rômulo 90+2'	Stadium: Pingguo Stadium; Attendance: 4,867; Referee: Huang Yi

20 June 2025 4th Round	Shandong Taishan	1–3	Chengdu Rongcheng	Jinan
	Lucas Gazal 54' (yellow card) 61'; Zeca (yellow card) 37'; Li Yuanyi (yellow card) 73'		Rômulo 39', 61'; Tim Chow 83' (yellow card) 55'; Wei Shihao (yellow card) 63'; Yang Ming Yang (yellow card) 64'	Stadium: Jinan Olympic Sports Center Stadium

23 July 2025 Quarter Final	Qingdao Hainiu	1–2	Chengdu Rongcheng	Qingdao
	Didier Lamkel Zé 85'; Luo Senwen (red card) 30'; Jia Feifan (yellow card) 90+8'		Wei Shihao 50', 72'; Pedro Delgado (yellow card) 38' (yellow-red card); Timo Letschert (yellow card) 45+5'	Stadium: Qingdao Youth Football Stadium

19 August 2025 Semi Final	Chengdu Rongcheng	0–0 (a.e.t.) (3–4 p)	Henan	Chengdu
	Timo Letschert (yellow card) 46'; Felipe Silva (yellow card) 85'; Wei Shihao (yellow card) 109'		Lucas Maia (yellow card) 33'; Felippe Cardoso (yellow card) 83'; Yang Yilin (yellow card) 90+1'; Lu Yongtao (yellow card) 119'	Stadium: Phoenix Hill Football Stadium
	Penalties
	Tim Chow (penalty scored); Romulo (penalty missed); Felipe Silva (penalty scored); Yan Dinghao (penalty scored); Timo Letschert (penalty missed)		Felippe Cardoso (penalty scored); Oliver Gerbig (penalty scored); Lucas Maia (penalty missed); Iago Maidana (penalty scored); Yeljan Shinar (penalty scored)

=== 2025–26 AFC Champions League Elite ===
==== Qualifying stage ====
12 August 2025 Playoff	Chengdu Rongcheng (China)	3–0	(Thailand) Bangkok United	Chengdu, China
	Yang Mingyang 68' (yellow card) 59'; Felipe 71', 83'; Li Yang (yellow card) 59'		Kyoga Nakamura (yellow card) 89'	Stadium: Phoenix Hill Football Stadium; Attendance: 41,713; Referee: Alex King (Australia)

==== League stage ====
Win Draw Loss

17 September 2025 MD 1	Ulsan HD FC (South Korea)	2–1	(China) Chengdu Rongcheng	Ulsan, South Korea
	Um Won-sang 76'; Heo Yool 90+8'; Lee Jae-Ik (yellow card) 66'	Report	Pedro Delgado 44' (yellow card) 83' (yellow-red card) 90+3'; Yang Shuai (yellow card) 54'	Stadium: Ulsan Munsu Football Stadium; Attendance: 3,111; Referee: Ilgiz Tantashev (Uzbekistan)

30 September 2025 MD 2	Chengdu Rongcheng (China)	1–0	(South Korea) Gangwon FC	Chengdu, China
	Tim Chow 35'; Hu Hetao (yellow card) 32'	Report	Hwang Eun-Chong (yellow card) 85'; Kim Do-hyun (yellow card) 90+5'	Stadium: Phoenix Hill Football Stadium; Attendance: 41,463; Referee: Adel Al Naqbi (United Arab Emirates)

21 October 2025 MD 3	Chengdu Rongcheng (China)	0–2	(Malaysia) Johor Darul Ta'zim	Chengdu, China
	Dong Yanfeng (yellow card) 12'; Pedro Delgado (yellow card) 42'; Tim Chow (yellow card) 55'; Han Pengfei (yellow card) 59'; Tang Chuang (yellow card) 89'	Report	Óscar Arribas 5'; Nacho Méndez 61'; Jairo (yellow card) 13'; Jonathan Silva (yellow card) 30'	Stadium: Phoenix Hill Football Stadium; Attendance: 39,093; Referee: Abdulrahman Al-Jassim (Qatar)

4 November 2025 MD 4	FC Seoul (South Korea)	0–0	(China) Chengdu Rongcheng	Seoul, South Korea
	Kim Jin-su (yellow card) 77'	Report	Pedro Delgado (yellow card) 85'	Stadium: Seoul World Cup Stadium; Attendance: 6,279; Referee: Nazmi Nasaruddin (Malaysia)

25 November 2025 MD 5	Chengdu Rongcheng (China)	1–1	(Japan) Sanfrecce Hiroshima	Chengdu, China
	Felipe 53' (pen.); Timo Letschert (yellow card) 11'; Yan Dinghao (yellow card) 90+5'	Report	Mutsuki Kato 63'	Stadium: Phoenix Hill Football Stadium; Attendance: 27,836; Referee: Abdulla Ali Al Athba (Qatar)

9 December 2025 MD 6	Vissel Kobe (Japan)	2–2	(China) Chengdu Rongcheng	Kobe, Japan
	Yoshinori Muto 18'; Daiju Sasaki 90' (pen.); Haruya Ide (yellow card) 63'; Yuya Kuwasaki (yellow card) 69'	Report	Felipe 45+1', 77' (pen.); Dong Yanfeng (yellow card) 3'; Tim Chow (yellow card) 66'	Stadium: Noevir Stadium Kobe; Attendance: 8,718; Referee: Khaled Al-Hoish (Saudi Arabia)

10 February 2026 MD 7	Chengdu Rongcheng (China)	0–1	(Thailand) Buriram United	Chengdu, China
	Liao Lisheng (yellow card) 32'; Han Pengfei (yellow card) 45+5'; Hu Hetao (yellow card) 50'; Rômulo (yellow card) 60'; Wei Shihao (yellow card) 62'; Wang Dongsheng (yellow card) 81'	Report	Guilherme Bissoli 51'; Goran Čaušić (yellow card) 17'; Kingsley Schindler (yellow card) 19'; Sandy Walsh (yellow card) 38'; Neil Etheridge (yellow card) 57'; Rubén Sánchez (yellow card) 75'; Peter Zulj (yellow card) 90'	Stadium: Phoenix Hill Football Stadium; Attendance: 40,676; Referee: Yusuke Araki (Japan)

17 February 2026 MD 8	FC Machida Zelvia (Japan)	–	(China) Chengdu Rongcheng	Machida, Japan
		Report		Stadium: Machida GION Stadium

Pos	Team	Pld	W	D	L	GF	GA	GD	Pts	Qualification
1	(Japan) Machida Zelvia	8	5	2	1	15	7	+8	17	Advance to round of 16
2	(Japan) Vissel Kobe	8	5	1	2	14	7	+7	16	Advance to round of 16
3	(Japan) Sanfrecce Hiroshima	8	4	3	1	10	6	+4	15	Advance to round of 16
4	(Thailand) Buriram United	8	4	2	2	10	8	+2	14	Advance to round of 16
5	(Australia) Melbourne City	8	4	2	2	9	7	+2	14	Advance to round of 16
6	(Malaysia) Johor Darul Ta'zim	8	3	2	3	8	7	+1	11	Advance to round of 16
7	(South Korea) FC Seoul	8	2	4	2	10	9	+1	10	Advance to round of 16
8	(South Korea) Gangwon FC	8	2	3	3	9	11	−2	9	Advance to round of 16
9	(South Korea) Ulsan HD	8	2	3	3	6	8	−2	9	
10	(China) Chengdu Rongcheng	8	1	3	4	7	11	−4	6	
11	(China) Shanghai Shenhua	8	1	1	6	5	13	−8	4	
12	(China) Shanghai Port	8	0	4	4	2	11	−9	4	

Source: ACLE
Rules for classification: 1) points; 2) goal difference; 3) number of goals scored; 4) number of matches won; 5) penalty shoot-out if only two teams remain tied and played each other on the final matchday 6) fair play ranking; 7) drawing of lots
