= Liao Rongxiang =

Chinese footballer (born 2004)

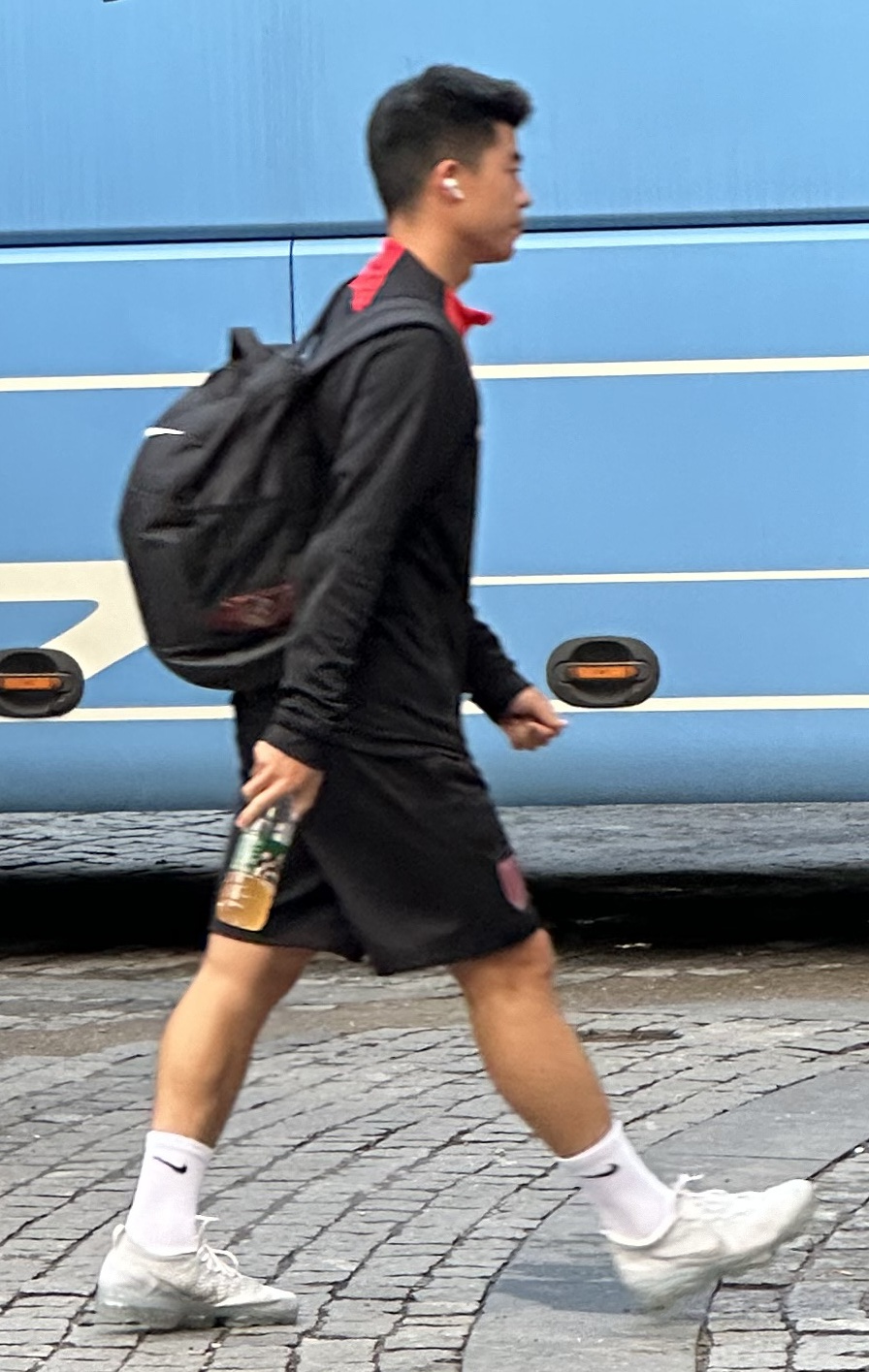
- Liao Rongxiang in August 2024

Personal information
- Full name: Liao Rongxiang
- Date of birth: 27 October 2004 (age 22)
- Place of birth: Chengdu, Sichuan, China
- Height: 1.72 m (5 ft 8 in)
- Position: Midfielder

Team information
- Current team: Chengdu Rongcheng
- Number: 58

Youth career
- 2015–2022: Chengdu Derui
- 2022: Chengdu Rongcheng

Senior career*
| Years | Team | Apps | (Gls) |
| 2022– | Chengdu Rongcheng | 21 | (2) |
| 2025 | Chengdu Rongcheng B | 18 | (5) |

International career^{‡}
| 2024 | China U21 | 2 | (0) |
- * Club domestic league appearances and goals as of 31 August 2026 ‡ National team caps and goals as of 22 November 2025

Liao Rongxiang (simplified Chinese: 廖荣祥; traditional Chinese: 廖榮祥; pinyin: Liào Róngxiáng; born 27 October 2004) is a Chinese professional footballer who plays as a midfielder for Chinese Super League club Chengdu Rongcheng.

== Club career ==
Born in Chengdu, Sichuan, Liao Rongxiang joined the Chengdu Derui youth academy in 2015. In 2021, he featured for the Sichuan provincial under-20 football team in the 2021 National Games of China. In 2022, Liao made a move to the U21 team of Chengdu Rongcheng. On 5 January 2023, Liao made his senior debut with Chengdu Rongcheng in a 4–0 2022 Chinese FA Cup quarter-final first leg defeat to Shanghai Port, coming on as a 76th-minute substitute for Dai Wenhao as the number 61. Three days later, he made an appearance in a 4–0 loss in the second leg, replacing Wu Guichao in the 60th minute. On 14 April 2023, he was officially promoted to the first-team, and was given the number 35. On 23 June 2023, he featured in the away penalty shoot-out loss to China League Two side Chongqing Tonglianglong, substituting Mutellip Iminqari in the 84th minute. On 21 June 2024, he made his fourth Chinese FA Cup appearance in a penalty shoout-out win against Chinese Champions League side Shanghai Mitsubishi Industries Flying Lion. In the 2024 CFA U-21 League, Liao helped Chengdu Rongcheng U21 finish in second place, securing promotion to China League Two.

In the 2025 season, Liao was dual-registered for Chengdu Rongcheng's first-team, as well as its B team in China League Two, changing to the number 58. On 23 March 2025, he made his league debut with Chengdu Rongcheng B in a 2–1 home win over Guangzhou Dandelion Alpha. In the following match on 30 March, he scored his first senior and professional goal for Chengdu Rongcheng B in a 3–1 away victory against Guangdong Mingtu. He scored a second goal for Chengdu Rongcheng B in a 4–1 away win over Quanzhou Yassin on 2 May 2025. Seven weeks later on 25 June, he made his first-team and Chinese Super League debut for Chengdu Rongcheng in a 5–0 home victory against Shenzhen Peng City, replacing Wei Shihao in the 70th minute. On 23 August 2025, Liao scored his first Chinese Super League and first-team goal in an away 5–1 win over newly promoted Yunnan Yukun.

== International career ==
In August 2024, Liao was called up to the China U21 to compete in an invitational youth competition. On 4 September 2024, he made his first appearance for China U21 in a 2–1 victory against Vietnam.

== Personal life ==
In December 2024, Liao Rongxiang and Chengdu Rongcheng teammate Meng Junjie spotted and saved a civilian from drowning in a river as the two were walking towards training.

== Career statistics ==
=== Club ===
As of 9 December 2025

Appearances and goals by club, season, and competition
| Club | Season | League | | | Cup | | Continental | | Other | | Total | |
| Club | Season | Division | Apps | Goals | Apps | Goals | Apps | Goals | Apps | Goals | Apps | Goals |
|---|---|---|---|---|---|---|---|---|---|---|---|---|
| Chengdu Rongcheng | 2022 | Chinese Super League | 0 | 0 | 2 | 0 | – | | – | | 2 | 0 |
| Chengdu Rongcheng | 2023 | Chinese Super League | 0 | 0 | 1 | 0 | – | | – | | 1 | 0 |
| Chengdu Rongcheng | 2024 | Chinese Super League | 0 | 0 | 1 | 0 | – | | – | | 1 | 0 |
| Chengdu Rongcheng | 2025 | Chinese Super League | 11 | 1 | 2 | 0 | 7 (Note: Appearances in AFC Champions League Elite) | 0 | – | | 20 | 1 |
| Chengdu Rongcheng | Total | | 11 | 1 | 6 | 0 | 7 | 0 | 0 | 0 | 24 | 1 |
| Chengdu Rongcheng B | 2025 | China League Two | 18 | 5 | – | | – | | – | | 18 | 5 |
| Career total | | | 29 | 6 | 6 | 0 | 7 | 0 | 0 | 0 | 42 | 6 |
