= Yang Shuai (footballer) =

Chinese footballer

Yang Shuai 杨帅
Personal information
- Date of birth: 28 January 1997 (age 29)
- Place of birth: Xuzhou, Jiangsu, China
- Height: 1.88 m (6 ft 2 in)
- Position: Centre-back

Team information
- Current team: Shanghai Shenhua
- Number: 26

Youth career
- 2013–2016: Liaoning FC

Senior career*
Years	Team	Apps	(Gls)
2017–2019	Liaoning FC	12	(1)
2019–2022	Chongqing Lifan	67	(2)
2022–2023	Henan FC	53	(3)
2024–2025	Chengdu Rongcheng	40	(0)
2026–	Shanghai Shenhua	13	(1)

International career^{‡}
2016	China U-19	4	(0)
2018–2020	China U-23	1	(0)
- * Club domestic league appearances and goals as of 19 November 2026 ‡ National team caps and goals as of 5 June 2018

Yang Shuai (simplified Chinese: 杨帅; traditional Chinese: 楊帥; pinyin: Yáng Shuài; born 28 January 1997) is a Chinese footballer who currently plays for Chinese Super League side Shanghai Shenhua as a left-footed centre-back.

== Club career ==
Yang Shuai started his professional football career in 2017 when he was promoted to Chinese Super League side Liaoning FC's first team squad. On 2 May 2017, he made his senior debut in a 4–3 away defeat against Hangzhou Greentown, coming on as a substitute for Lu Qiang in the beginning of second half. He made his league debut on 10 August 2017, playing the whole match in a 3–0 home loss against Guangzhou Evergrande. On 24 April 2018, he scored his first senior goal in a 4–1 home loss against Dalian Yifang in the 2018 Chinese FA Cup.

On 12 February 2019, Yang transferred to Chinese Super League side Chongqing Lifan. He would make his debut for the club in a league game on 2 March 2019 against Guangzhou R&F in 2-2 draw. He would go on to establish himself as an integral member of the team throughout his three seasons at the club.

On 26 April 2022, he joined fellow top tier club Henan Songshan Longmen (now known as Henan FC) for the start of the 2022 Chinese Super League. This would be followed by his debut appearance for the club on 4 June 2022 in a league game against Dalian Professional in a 2-2 draw. After establishing himself as an integral member of the team he would score his first goal for the club on 11 June 2022, which was in a league game against Zhejiang Professional in a 3-1 victory.

On 6 January 2026, Yang joined fellow top tier club Shanghai Shenhua in 2026 season.

== Career statistics ==
As of match played 31 December 2025.

Appearances and goals by club, season and competition
Club	Season	League			National Cup		Continental		Other		Total	
Club	Season	Division	Apps	Goals	Apps	Goals	Apps	Goals	Apps	Goals	Apps	Goals
Liaoning FC	2017	Chinese Super League	8	0	1	0	–		–		9	0
Liaoning FC	2018	China League One	2	0	2	1	–		–		4	1
Liaoning FC	Total		10	0	3	1	0	0	0	0	13	1
Chongqing Lifan	2019	Chinese Super League	29	0	2	0	–		–		31	0
Chongqing Lifan	2020	Chinese Super League	18	1	1	0	–		–		19	1
Chongqing Lifan	2021	Chinese Super League	20	1	2	0	–		–		22	1
Chongqing Lifan	Total		67	2	5	0	0	0	0	0	72	2
Henan Songshan Longmen/ Henan FC	2022	Chinese Super League	32	3	0	0	–		–		32	3
Henan Songshan Longmen/ Henan FC	2023	Chinese Super League	21	0	2	0	–		–		23	0
Henan Songshan Longmen/ Henan FC	Total		53	3	2	0	0	0	0	0	55	3
Chengdu Rongcheng	2024	Chinese Super League	23	0	2	0	–		–		25	0
Chengdu Rongcheng	2025	Chinese Super League	17	0	4	0	3	0	–		24	0
Chengdu Rongcheng	Total		40	0	6	0	3	0	0	0	49	0
Career total			170	5	16	1	3	0	0	0	189	2
