= Chen Shihan =

Chinese footballer (born 2005)

Personal information
- Full name: Chen Shihan
- Date of birth: December 12, 2005 (age 20)
- Place of birth: Yancheng, Jiangsu, China
- Position: Forward

Team information
- Current team: Chengdu Rongcheng
- Number: 21

Youth career
- Shandong Taishan

Senior career*
Years	Team	Apps	(Gls)
2023–2026	Union Rochefortoise	3	(0)
2026–	Chengdu Rongcheng	0	(0)

International career
2024–2025	China U19	1	(0)
2025–	China U20	1	(0)
- * Club domestic league appearances and goals as of 10 April 2026

Chen Shihan (Chinese: 陈仕晗; born 12 December 2005) is a Chinese professional footballer who plays as a forward for Chinese Super League club Chengdu Rongcheng. He developed in the Shandong Taishan youth academy and later moved to Europe to play in the Belgian lower divisions.

== Early life and career beginnings ==
Born in Shandong Province, Chen joined the Shandong Taishan youth academy at the age of 12. He gained recognition during the 2023 season, scoring 14 goals in 20 appearances for the U19 team, which drew interest from European scouts.

== Club career ==
In 2024, Chen signed with Belgian fourth-tier club R.R.F.C. Rushoise Union. Although the team finished second in the regular season and lost in the promotion playoffs, they were promoted to the Belgian Third Division due to league restructuring. During the 2024 season, Chen made 28 appearances, scoring 3 goals and providing 2 assists, including a decisive last-minute goal in a key match against RFC Wetteren.

On 25 July 2026, Chen returned to China and joined Chinese Super League club Chengdu Rongcheng.

== International career ==
Chen has been a consistent member of the China U19 national team since 2022. His performances in Belgium led to his inclusion in the U20 squad for the 2025 AFC U20 Asian Cup.

== Career statistics ==
As of 16 February 2025

Club	Season	League	Goals	Assists
R.R.F.C. Rushoise Union	2024	Belgian Fourth Division	3	2

Source: Club reports and match data
