= Li Yang (footballer, born 1997) =

Chinese association football player

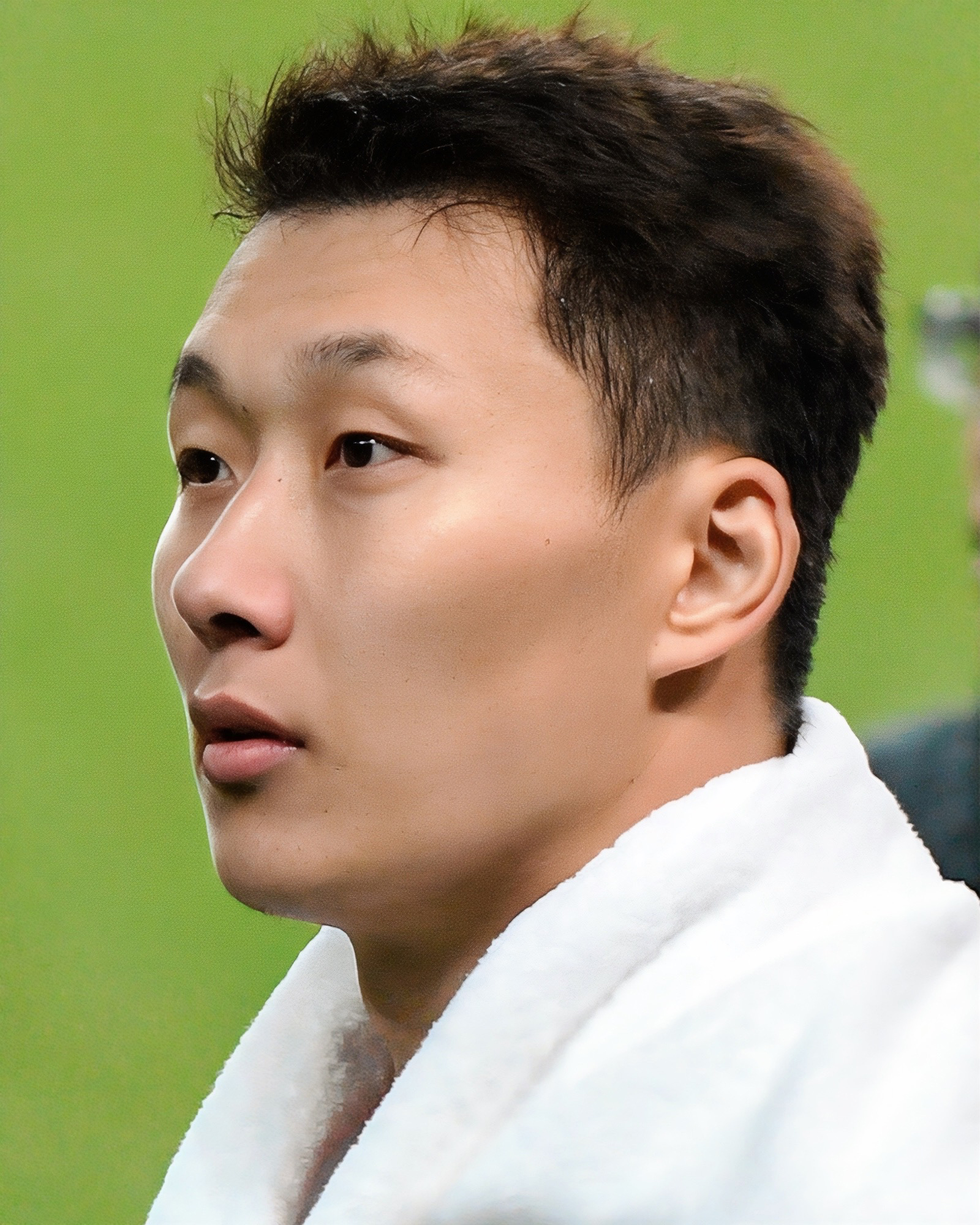
- Li in 2025

Personal information
- Date of birth: 22 July 1997 (age 29)
- Place of birth: Yancheng, Jiangsu, China
- Height: 1.85 m (6 ft 1 in)
- Position: Defender

Team information
- Current team: Chengdu Rongcheng
- Number: 22

Youth career
- –2017: Gondomar
- 2017–2018: Coimbrões

Senior career*
Years	Team	Apps	(Gls)
2018	Coimbrões	1	(0)
2018–2020	Vitória	0	(0)
2019	→ Shanghai Shenhua (loan)	0	(0)
2020–2021	Gondomar	1	(0)
2021	→ Wuhan FC (loan)	9	(0)
2022	Guangzhou FC	30	(0)
2023	Wuhan Three Towns	14	(2)
2024–	Chengdu Rongcheng	58	(1)

International career^{‡}
2015	China U18	1	(0)
2018–2019	China U22	6	(1)
2026–	China	3	(0)
- * Club domestic league appearances and goals as of 31 August 2026 ‡ National team caps and goals as of 31 March 2026

Li Yang (Chinese: 李扬; born 22 July 1997) is a Chinese professional footballer currently playing as a defender for Chengdu Rongcheng and the China national team.

== Club career ==
Li Yang would represent Jiangsu in the 2015 China National Youth Games, where they came runners-up at the end of the tournament. He would go abroad to Portugal to continue his development where he played for Gondomar and then Coimbrões. At Coimbrões he would be promoted to their senior team where he made his debut on 21 January 2018 in a Campeonato de Portugal league game against Canelas 2010, coming on as a substitute in a 3-2 victory. This would be followed by a transfer to Primeira Liga club Vitória who loaned him out to Chinese Super League club Shanghai Shenhua on 8 July 2019, however his return to China only saw him play a single game against Tianjin TEDA F.C. in the Chinese FA Cup that ended in a 3-1 victory.

On 4 April 2023 he would join fellow top tier club Wuhan Three Towns for the start of the 2023 Chinese Super League campaign. He made his debut on 15 April 2023 in a league game against Shanghai Port in a 2-0 defeat. This was followed by his first goal, which was against Qingdao Hainiu on 29 April 2023 in a league game that ended in a 3-0 victory. After a season, Li transferred to another top tier club in Chengdu Rongcheng on 20 February 2024. He made his debut on 2 March 2023 in a league game against Qingdao Hainiu in a 2-0 victory, where he also scored his first goal for the club in the same match.

== International career ==
On 24 September 2026, Li made his debut for the senior China national team in a friendly against the Maldives.

== Career statistics ==
As of 9 March 2026.

Appearances and goals by club, season and competition
Club	Season	League			National Cup		Continental		Other		Total	
Club	Season	Division	Apps	Goals	Apps	Goals	Apps	Goals	Apps	Goals	Apps	Goals
Coimbrões	2017–18	Campeonato de Portugal	1	0	0	0	–		–		1	0
Vitória	2019–20	Primeira Liga	0	0	0	0	–		–		0	0
Shanghai Shenhua (loan)	2019	Chinese Super League	0	0	1	0	–		–		1	0
Gondomar	2020–21	Campeonato de Portugal	1	0	2	0	–		–		3	0
Wuhan (loan)	2021	Chinese Super League	9	0	4	0	–		–		13	0
Guangzhou	2022	Chinese Super League	30	0	0	0	0	0	–		30	0
Wuhan Three Towns	2023	Chinese Super League	14	2	0	0	3 (Note: Appearances in 2023–24 AFC Champions League)	0	0 (Note: Appearances in the Chinese FA Super Cup)	0	17	2
Chengdu Rongcheng	2024	Chinese Super League	14	1	4	0	–		–		18	1
Chengdu Rongcheng	2025	Chinese Super League	29	0	3	0	8 (Note: Seven appearances in 2025–26 AFC Champions League Elite, one appearance in qualification)	0	–		40	0
Chengdu Rongcheng	2026	Chinese Super League	0	0	0	0	–		–		0	0
Chengdu Rongcheng	Total		43	1	7	0	8	0	0	0	58	1
Career total			98	3	14	0	11	0	0	0	123	3

== Honours ==
Wuhan Three Towns

- Chinese FA Super Cup: 2023
