= Hu Hetao =

Chinese footballer (born 2003)

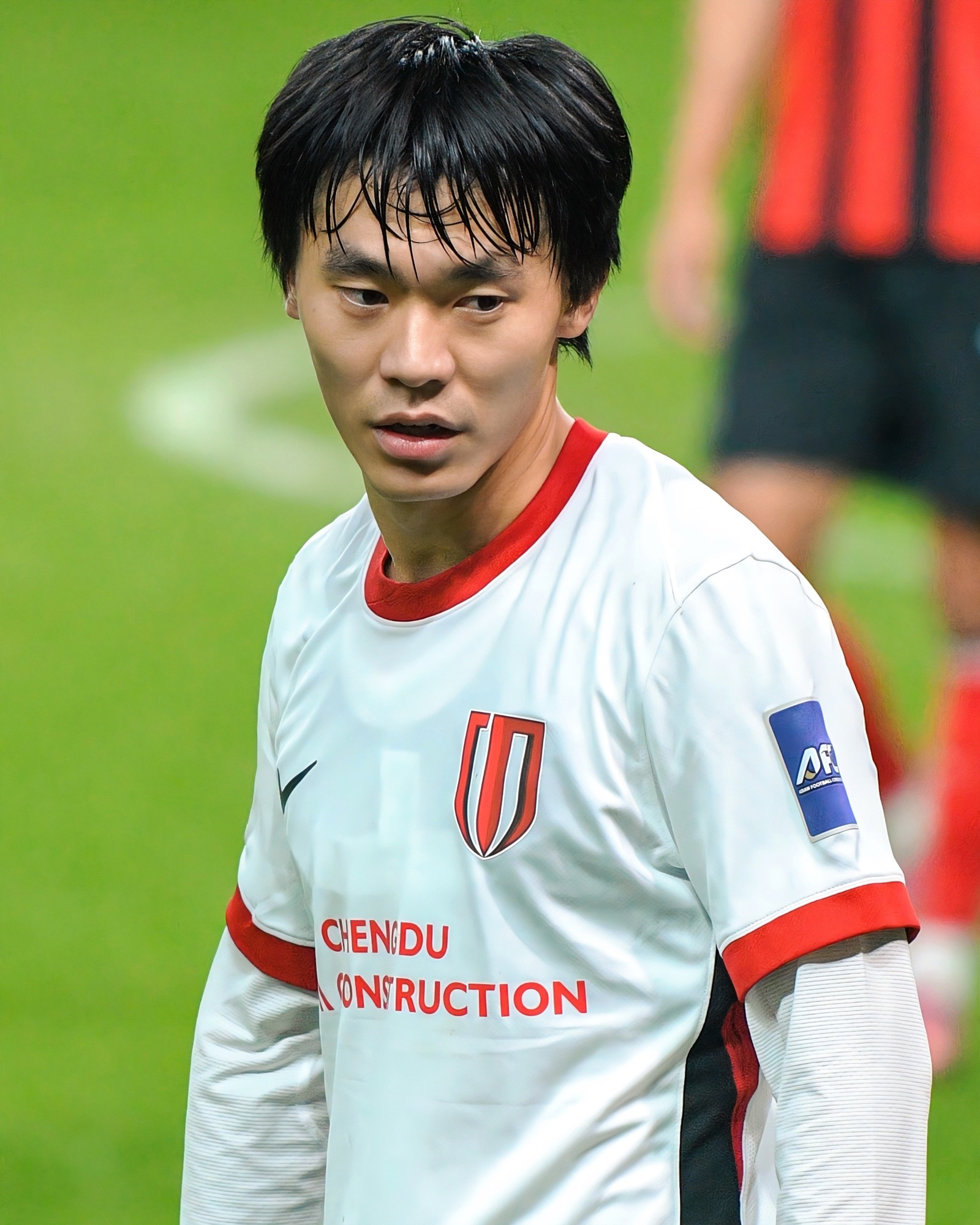
- Hu Hetao in November 2025

Personal information
- Date of birth: 5 October 2003 (age 23)
- Place of birth: Wanzhou District, Chongqing, China
- Height: 1.73 m (5 ft 8 in)
- Position: Left wing-back

Team information
- Current team: Chengdu Rongcheng
- Number: 2

Youth career
- –2022: Chengdu Rongcheng

Senior career*
Years	Team	Apps	(Gls)
2022–	Chengdu Rongcheng	92	(5)

International career^{‡}
2022–2023	China U20	7	(0)
2023–2026	China U23	28	(2)
2024–	China	9	(0)
Medal record
Representing China
AFC U-23 Asian Cup
Runner-up	2026 Saudi Arabia	Team
Asian Games
Bronze medal – third place	2026 Aichi–Nagoya	Team
- * Club domestic league appearances and goals as of 31 August 2026 ‡ National team caps and goals as of 22 January 2026

Hu Hetao (simplified Chinese: 胡荷韬; traditional Chinese: 胡荷韜; pinyin: Hú Hétāo; born 5 October 2003) is a Chinese professional footballer who plays as a left wing-back for Chinese Super League club Chengdu Rongcheng and the China national team.

== Early life ==
Born in Wanzhou, Chongqing, Hu Hetao attended Chongqing Yucai Secondary School until 2018, prior to starting a professional football career. In 2022, after spending the few years prior preparing for Gaokao, he was called up to the Chengdu Rongcheng first-team.

== Club career ==
Before the 2022 Chinese Super League season, Hu Hetao was named in Chengdu Rongcheng's 31-man first-team squad, to which Hu Hetao reacts as "fulfilling his dream." He made his professional debut in the Chinese Super League on 4 June 2022 in a match against Shenzhen, playing 74 minutes as a starter at left wing-back. He scored his first senior goal a month later on 11 July 2022, providing an equalising goal after coming on as a substitute, to see Chengdu Rongcheng eventually turn the game around, winning 2–1 away against Meizhou Hakka. After putting in a good shift against Wuhan Three Towns on 23 December 2022, Hu Hetao was selected as the CSL's Player of the Round. After a successful debut season with Chengdu Rongcheng, he was shortlisted as a candidate for the club's player of the season.

In the 2023 season, Hu Hetao was regularly called up to the China U20 and the China U23 national teams, participating in months-long national team training camps. As a result, he could not find consistent game time at club level, and caused a steep dip in his form, only managing eight appearances in all competitions throughout the season.

== International career ==
In February 2023, Hu was selected as part of the China U20 squad for the 2023 AFC U-20 Asian Cup. Throughout the year of 2023, Hu Hetao was called up to several months-long training camps at the U20 and the U23 levels.

On 5 April 2024, Hu was included in the China U23 squad for the 2024 AFC U-23 Asian Cup.

Hu made his debut for the China national team on 10 October 2024 in a World Cup qualifier against Australia at the Adelaide Oval. He played the full game as Australia won 3–1.

== Personal life ==
Hu Hetao was a ball boy at the 2021 Chinese FA Cup final.

== Career statistics ==
=== Club ===
As of 9 December 2025

Appearances and goals by club, season, and competition
Club	Season	League			Cup		Continental		Other		Total	
Club	Season	Division	Apps	Goals	Apps	Goals	Apps	Goals	Apps	Goals	Apps	Goals
Chengdu Rongcheng	2022	Chinese Super League	23	1	2	0	–		–		25	1
Chengdu Rongcheng	2023	Chinese Super League	7	0	1	0	–		–		8	0
Chengdu Rongcheng	2024	Chinese Super League	16	2	3	0	–		–		19	2
Chengdu Rongcheng	2025	Chinese Super League	21	1	2	0	6 (Note: Appearances in AFC Champions League Elite)	0	–		29	1
Chengdu Rongcheng	Total		67	4	8	0	6	0	0	0	81	4
Career total			67	4	8	0	6	0	0	0	81	4

=== International ===
As of 5 June 2025

Appearances and goals by national team and year
National team	Year	Apps	Goals
China	2024	3	0
China	2025	2	0
China	2026	4	2
Total		9	1

== Honours ==
China U23

- AFC U-23 Asian Cup: 2026 (Silver Medal)
- Asian Games: 2026 (Bronze Medal)
