= Tang Chuang =

Chinese footballer (born 1996)

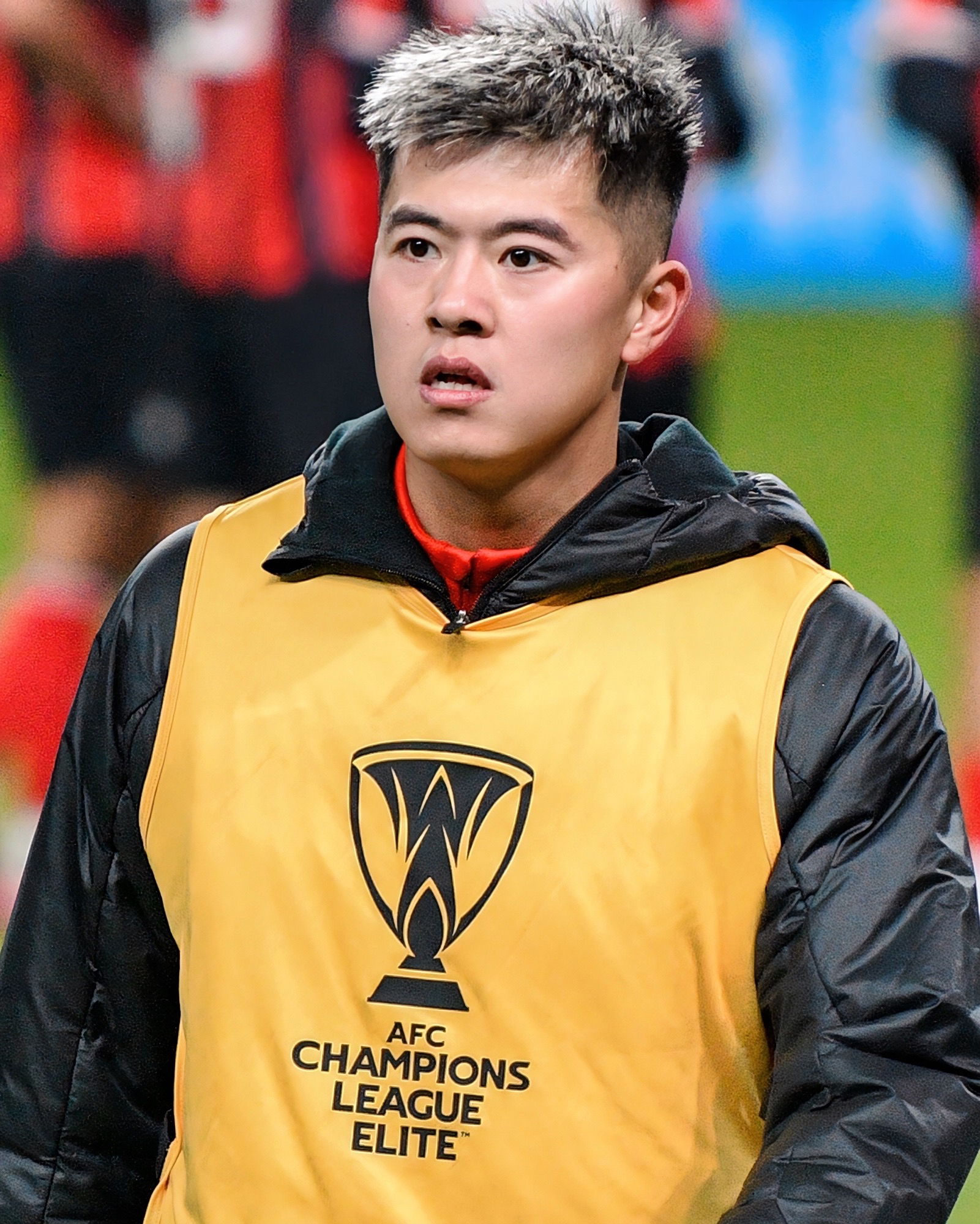
- Tang in 2025

Personal information
- Full name: Tang Chuang
- Date of birth: 30 April 1996 (age 30)
- Place of birth: Handan, Hebei, China
- Height: 1.88 m (6 ft 2 in)
- Position: Striker

Team information
- Current team: Chengdu Rongcheng
- Number: 24

College career
Years	Team	Apps	(Gls)
2015–2016	Qingdao UST		

Senior career*
Years	Team	Apps	(Gls)
2017	Qingdao Elite United		
2018	Qingdao Red Lions		
2019	Qingdao Daqi		
2020–2022	Suzhou Dongwu	72	(18)
2023–	Chengdu Rongcheng	33	(5)
- * Club domestic league appearances and goals as of 31 August 2026

Tang Chuang (simplified Chinese: 唐创; traditional Chinese: 唐創; pinyin: Táng Chuàng; born 30 April 1996) is a Chinese professional footballer who plays as a striker for Chinese Super League club Chengdu Rongcheng.

== College career ==
Tang Chuang attended Qingdao University of Science and Technology in a pursuit to play football. In the period between 2014 and 2015, he was nominated as a "stand-out student" of the university. In 2015, Tang played futsal with the university team, and represented the university's home province of Shandong in a national futsal tournament, after winning the provincial championship.

== Club career ==
=== Early career ===
After a spell at amateur club Qingdao Elite United, in 2018, Tang Chuang signed with then-Chinese Champions League club Qingdao Red Lions, who at the time were managed by Guo Zuojin, Tang's coach at QUST. In the 2018 season, Totalling five goals in four appearances, Tang eventually helped Qingdao Red Lions gain promotion to China League Two. In February 2019, he agreed a deal to sign for China League One club Yanbian Funde in principle, however, the club would be dissolved the same preseason. The same year, he returned to playing amateur football, with a move to Qingdao Daqi.

=== Suzhou Dongwu ===
On 9 September 2020, Tang signed for China League One club Suzhou Dongwu on a short-term free transfer, under recommendation from Sun Xinbo, whom he played under at Qingdao Daqi. On 24 September 2020, Tang scored his first professional goal, in a 2–1 league defeat to Chengdu Better City.

Before the start of the 2021 season, Tang signed a new contract extension for Suzhou Dongwu. On 6 August 2021, Tang Chuang scored in consecutive matches, getting on the score sheet in a 2–1 defeat to Chengdu Rongcheng and a 3–0 win over Xinjiang Tianshan Leopard. After the end of the 2021 season, Tang Chuang finished with 7 goals in 30 appearances in all competitions.

Tang Chuang experienced his break-out season with Suzhou Dongwu in 2022. On 13 August 2022, he scored the first double of his career, with a penalty and a header to give Suzhou Dongwu a 2–0 win against Beijing IT. At the end of the 2022 season, Tang Chuang provided 10 goals in 31 appearances across all competitions, and played a big role in getting a sixth-place finish for the club.

=== Chengdu Rongcheng ===
On 12 April 2023, Tang made a move to Chinese Super League side Chengdu Rongcheng. On 23 June 2023, he made his debut for the club in a 2023 Chinese FA Cup tie away at Chongqing Tonglianglong, which ended in a penalty shoot-out loss for Chengdu, with him missing a penalty in the shoot-out. Two weeks later on 7 July, Tang scored his first goal for Chengdu Rongcheng, in a 3–1 league defeat away at Meizhou Hakka.

== Career statistics ==
=== Club ===
As of 21 October 2025

Appearances and goals by club, season, and competition
Club	Season	League			Cup		Continental		Other		Total	
Club	Season	Division	Apps	Goals	Apps	Goals	Apps	Goals	Apps	Goals	Apps	Goals
Suzhou Dongwu	2020	China League One	12	1	1	1	–		–		13	2
Suzhou Dongwu	2021	China League One	29	7	1	0	–		–		30	7
Suzhou Dongwu	2022	China League One	31	10	0	0	–		–		31	10
Suzhou Dongwu	Total		72	18	2	1	0	0	0	0	74	19
Chengdu Rongcheng	2023	Chinese Super League	16	2	1	0	–		–		17	2
Chengdu Rongcheng	2024	Chinese Super League	14	3	2	1	–		–		16	4
Chengdu Rongcheng	2025	Chinese Super League	2	0	1	0	2 (Note: Appearances in AFC Champions League Elite)	0	–		5	0
Chengdu Rongcheng	Total		32	5	4	1	2	0	0	0	38	6
Career total			104	23	6	2	2	0	0	0	112	25
