= Yuan Mincheng =

Chinese footballer

Yuan Mincheng 元敏诚
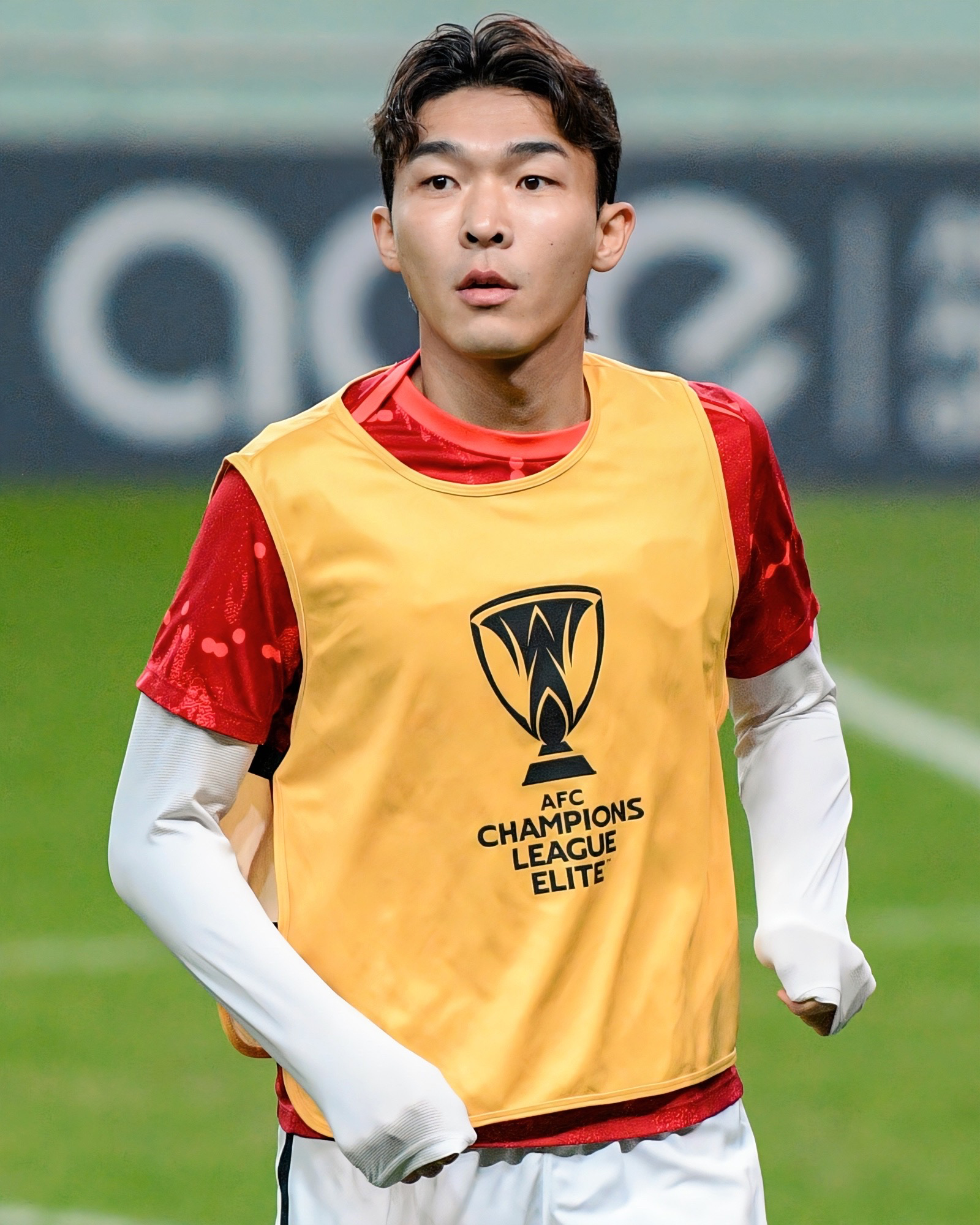
- Yuan in 2025

Personal information
- Date of birth: 8 August 1995 (age 31)
- Place of birth: Yanji, Jilin, China
- Height: 1.87 m (6 ft 2 in)
- Position: Defender

Team information
- Current team: Liaoning Tieren
- Number: 26

Youth career
- Yanbian FC

Senior career*
Years	Team	Apps	(Gls)
2015	Guangxi Longguida	10	(0)
2016	Nantong Zhiyun	15	(0)
2017–2020	Chongqing Lifan	65	(4)
2021–2023	Shenzhen FC	51	(3)
2023–2024	Changchun Yatai	29	(0)
2025	Chengdu Rongcheng	24	(2)
2026–	Liaoning Tieren	27	(0)
- * Club domestic league appearances and goals as of 22 November 2026

Yuan Mincheng (Chinese: 元敏诚; Korean: 원민성; born 8 August 1995) is a Chinese professional footballer who plays for Chinese Super League club Liaoning Tieren.

== Club career ==
Yuan Mincheng joined China League Two side Guangxi Longguida in 2015 after he failed to gain promotion to Yanbian FC's first team squad. He moved to Nantong Zhiyun in 2016 when Nantong bought the first team of Guangxi Longguida as well as their position in the China League Two. He would go on to establish himself as a regular by making 15 league appearances within the team throughout the season.

=== Chongqing Lifan ===
Yuan transferred to Chinese Super League side Chongqing Lifan on 28 February 2017. On 3 May 2017, he made his debut for Chongqing in the 2017 Chinese FA Cup in a 1–0 away defeat against China League Two club Heilongjiang Lava Spring, coming on as a substitute for Li Fang in the 80th minute. His Chinese Super League debut came on three days later on 6 May 2017 in a 3–2 home defeat against Henan Jianye as the benefit of the new rule of the league that at least one Under-23 player must be in the starting line-up and was substituted off by Wang Weicheng in the 14th minute. On 20 October 2018, he scored his first senior goal in a 4–4 home draw against Hebei China Fortune.

=== Shenzhen FC ===
On 8 April 2021, Yuan joined fellow Chinese Super League club Shenzhen FC, reuniting with his former head coach at Chongqing, Jordi Cruyff. He would make his debut on 21 April 2021, in a league game against Henan Songshan Longmen in a game that ended in a 2-1 victory. This was followed by his first goal for the club on 21 July 2021, in a league game against Chongqing Liangjiang Athletic F.C. that ended in a 3-0 victory.

=== Changchun Yatai ===
On 29 July 2023, Yuan joined fellow Chinese Super League club Changchun Yatai. He made his debut for the club on the same day in a 0-0 away draw against Tianjin Jinmen Tiger.

=== Chengdu Rongcheng ===
On 18 February 2025, Yuan joined Chinese Super League club Chengdu Rongcheng.

=== Liaoning Tieren ===
After the 2025 season, Yuan decided to join Chinese Super League club Liaoning Tieren on 26 February 2026.

== Career statistics ==
As of match played 19 June 2026.

Appearances and goals by club, season and competition
Club	Season	League			National Cup		Continental		Other		Total	
Club	Season	Division	Apps	Goals	Apps	Goals	Apps	Goals	Apps	Goals	Apps	Goals
Guangxi Longguida	2015	China League Two	10	0	2	0	-		-		12	0
Nantong Zhiyun	2016	China League Two	15	0	0	0	-		-		15	0
Chongqing Lifan	2017	Chinese Super League	3	0	1	0	-		-		4	0
Chongqing Lifan	2018	Chinese Super League	14	1	1	0	-		-		15	1
Chongqing Lifan	2019	Chinese Super League	29	1	2	0	-		-		31	1
Chongqing Lifan	2020	Chinese Super League	19	2	0	0	-		-		19	2
Chongqing Lifan	Total		65	4	4	0	0	0	0	0	69	4
Shenzhen FC	2021	Chinese Super League	16	1	3	0	-		-		19	1
Shenzhen FC	2022	Chinese Super League	19	1	1	0	-		-		20	1
Shenzhen FC	2023	Chinese Super League	16	1	0	0	-		-		16	1
Shenzhen FC	Total		51	3	4	0	0	0	0	0	55	3
Changchun Yatai	2023	Chinese Super League	8	0	0	0	-		-		8	0
Changchun Yatai	2024	Chinese Super League	21	0	2	0	-		-		23	0
Changchun Yatai	Total		29	0	2	0	0	0	0	0	31	0
Chengdu Rongcheng	2025	Chinese Super League	24	2	3	0	5	0	-		32	2
Liaoning Tieren	2026	Chinese Super League	14	0	1	0	-		-		15	0
Career total			208	9	16	0	5	0	0	0	229	9
