= Phoenix Hill Football Stadium =

Sports venue in Chengdu, China

- Chengdu Arena
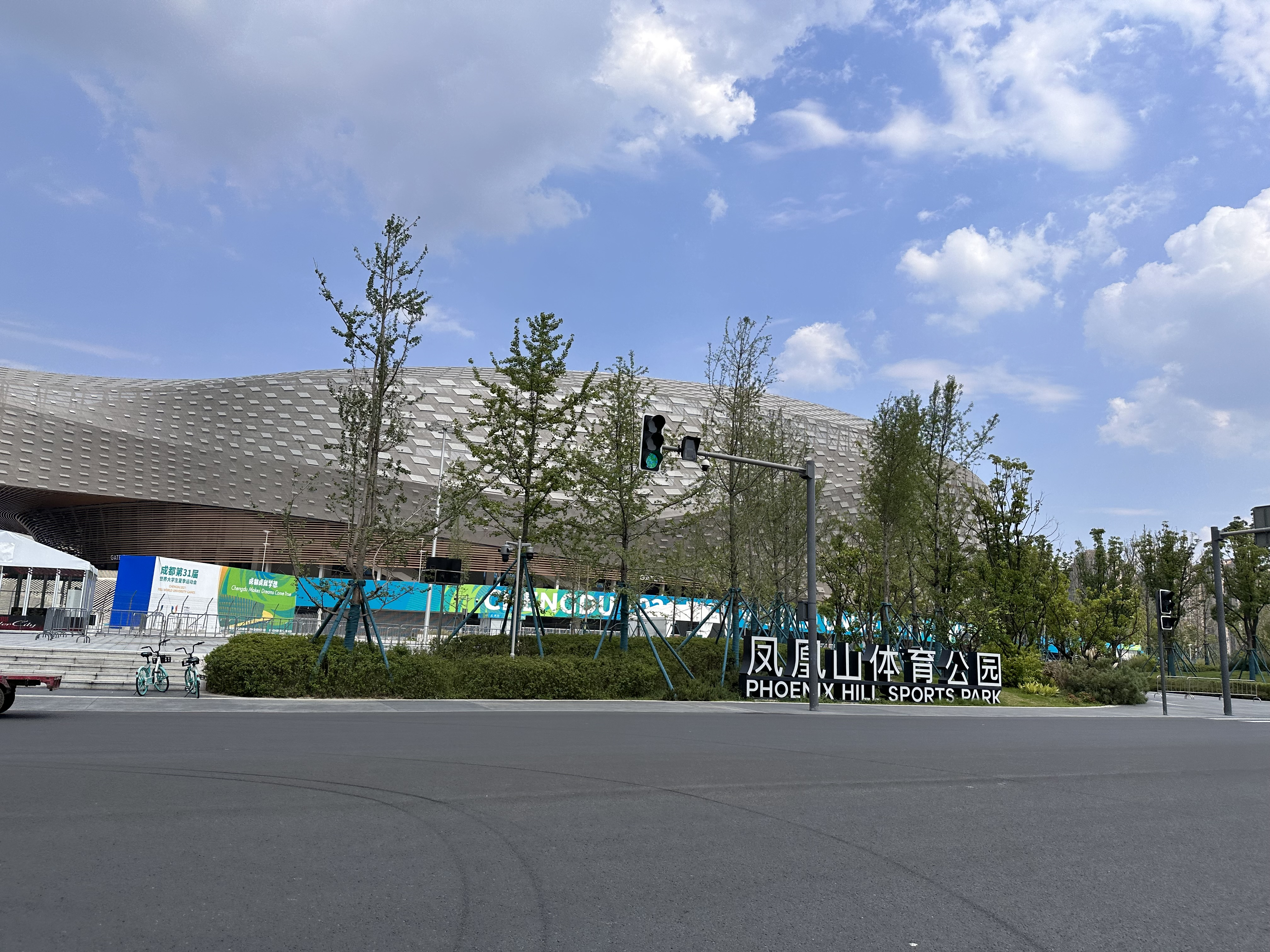
- Interactive map of Phoenix Hill Football Stadium
- Full name: Phoenix Hill Sports Park Football Stadium
- Location: Chengdu, Sichuan, China
- Coordinates: 30°46′10″N 104°04′33″E
- Capacity: 50,695
- Record attendance: 41,713 (Chengdu Rongcheng vs Bangkok United, 12 August 2025)
- Public transit: 5 at Dujianian

Construction
- Groundbreaking: 2019
- Opened: 2021

Tenants
- Chengdu Rongcheng (2022–present); China (select matches)

The Phoenix Hill Sports Park Football Stadium (Chinese: 凤凰山体育公园专业足球场) is a football stadium in Chengdu, Sichuan, China, and part of the greater Phoenix Hill Sports Park. The stadium is the home to Chinese Super League club Chengdu Rongcheng. Construction of the stadium began in 2019 and was completed in 2021, and was initially built as a venue for the 2023 AFC Asian Cup, before China withdrawn to host the event. The stadium was designed by HKS, Inc. The greater Sports Park Arena was used as a venue for the 2021 Summer World University Games, hosting basketball.

== History ==
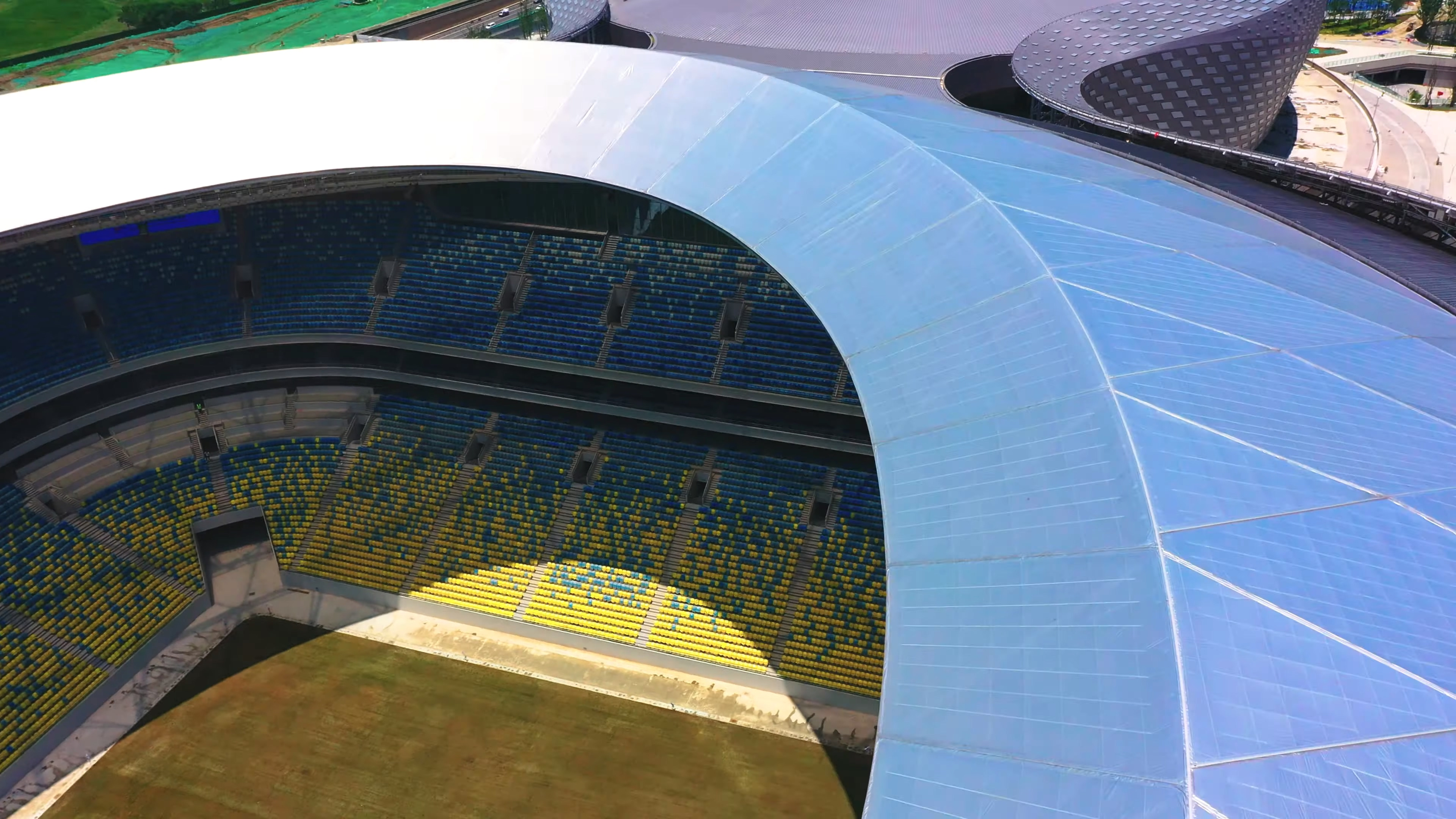
Phoenix hill football stadium on 7 July 2021

On 9 January 2022, the final of the 2021 Chinese FA Cup, a match-up between Shandong Taishan and Shanghai Port, was hosted at Phoenix Hill.

In September 2023, two China national football team matches were hosted at Phoenix Hill, as China picked up a 1–1 draw against Malaysia and a 1–0 loss to Syria.

In October 2023, Major League Soccer side Inter Miami announced that they would play a pre-season friendly against Chengdu Rongcheng at the stadium, but the match would be cancelled just two weeks later.

== Notable football events ==
- 2021 Chinese FA Cup
- 2025–26 AFC Champions League Elite

== International football matches ==
Date	Competition	Team 1	Score	Team 2
9 September 2023	Friendly	China	1–1	Malaysia
12 September 2023	Friendly	China	0–1	Syria
