= Gan Chao =

Chinese association football player

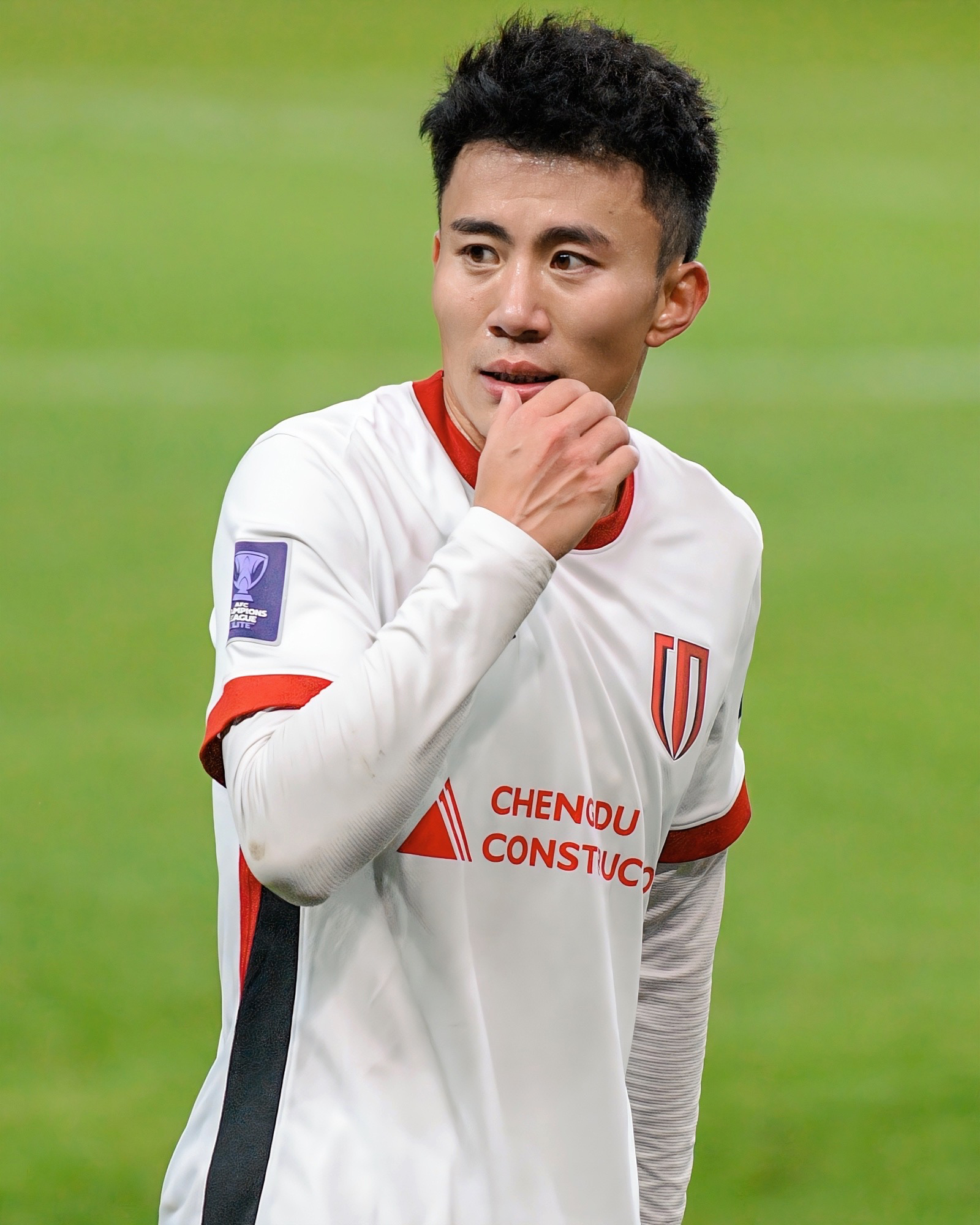
- Gan Chao in November 2025

Personal information
- Date of birth: 13 February 1995 (age 31)
- Place of birth: Chongqing, Sichuan, China
- Height: 1.75 m (5 ft 9 in)
- Position: Midfielder

Team information
- Current team: Chengdu Rongcheng
- Number: 39

Youth career
- –2017: Beijing Renhe

Senior career*
Years	Team	Apps	(Gls)
2014–2017	Beijing Renhe	15	(0)
2018–2021	Shenzhen FC	46	(2)
2021	→ Chengdu Rongcheng (loan)	27	(1)
2022–	Chengdu Rongcheng	105	(5)
- * Club domestic league appearances and goals as of 31 August 2026

Gan Chao (Chinese: 甘超; pinyin: Gān Chāo; born 13 February 1995) is a Chinese footballer currently playing as a midfielder for Chengdu Rongcheng.

== Club career ==
Gan Chao would be promoted to the senior team of top tier club Guizhou Renhe during the 2014 Chinese Super League season. He would go on to eventually make his debut on 7 July 2015 in a Chinese FA Cup game against Jiangxi Liansheng in a 3-2 victory. Unfortunately he would be part of the squad that was relegated at the end of the 2015 Chinese Super League campaign. Nevertheless he remained faithful towards the club even when they moved to Beijing and renamed themselves Beijing Renhe. Gan would gradually start to establish himself as a regular within the team and in the 2017 China League One campaign he would help the club gain promotion back into the top tier at the end of the season.

On 10 January 2018 second tier football club Shenzhen would sign Gan, for the 2018 China League One campaign. He would go on to make his debut in a league game on 11 March 2018 against Heilongjiang Lava Spring F.C. that ended in a 2-2 draw. He would go on to establish himself as a regular within the team and go on to gain another promotion with a different club at the end of his first season with Shenzhen. On 9 April 2021 he was loaned to second tier football club Chengdu Rongcheng. He would make his debut on 26 April 2021 in a league game against Jiangxi Beidamen, which ended in a 4-2 victory. At the end of the season he would establish himself as a regular within the team and aid them to promotion at the end of the 2021 league campaign.

== Career statistics ==
As of 8 January 2023.

Club	Season	League			Cup		Continental		Other		Total	
Club	Season	Division	Apps	Goals	Apps	Goals	Apps	Goals	Apps	Goals	Apps	Goals
Beijing Renhe	2014	Chinese Super League	0	0	0	0	–		–		0	0
Beijing Renhe	2015	Chinese Super League	0	0	2	0	–		–		2	0
Beijing Renhe	2016	China League One	2	0	2	0	–		–		4	0
Beijing Renhe	2017	China League One	13	0	1	0	–		–		14	0
Beijing Renhe	Total		15	0	5	0	0	0	0	0	20	0
Shenzhen	2018	China League One	27	0	0	0	–		–		27	0
Shenzhen	2019	Chinese Super League	19	2	1	0	–		–		20	2
Shenzhen	2020	Chinese Super League	0	0	0	0	–		–		0	0
Shenzhen	Total		46	2	1	0	0	0	0	0	47	2
Chengdu Rongcheng (loan)	2021	China League One	27	1	2	1	–		2 (Note: Appearance(s) in CSL Relegation play-offs)	0	31	2
Chengdu Rongcheng	2022	Chinese Super League	32	1	0	0	–		–		32	1
Career total			120	4	8	1	0	0	2	0	130	5
