= Han Pengfei =

Chinese footballer (born 1993)

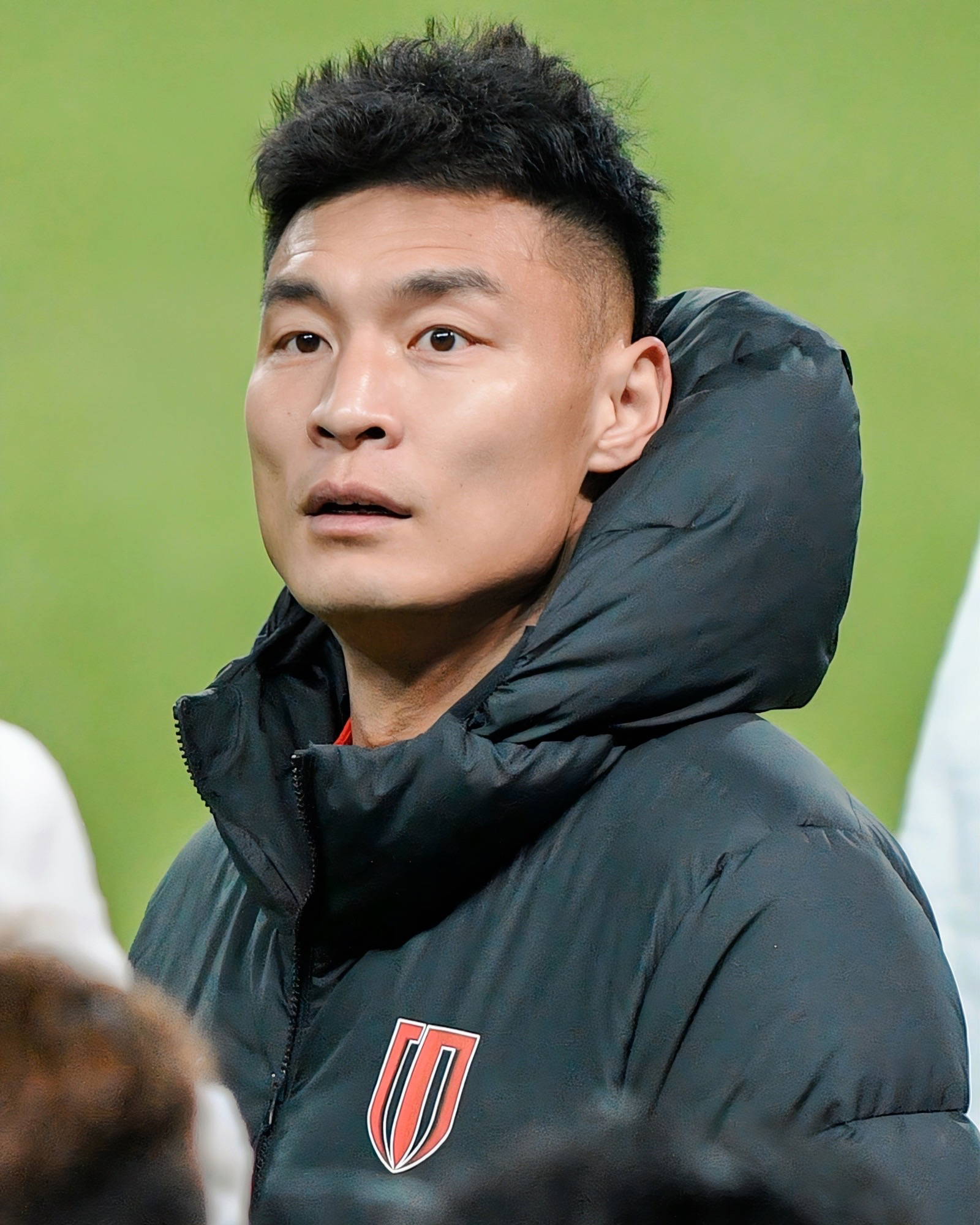
- Han Pengfei in November 2025

Personal information
- Date of birth: 28 April 1993 (age 33)
- Place of birth: Beijing, China
- Height: 1.87 m (6 ft 1 1/2 in)
- Position: Defender

Team information
- Current team: Chengdu Rongcheng
- Number: 18

Youth career
- 2008–2012: Dalian Shide

Senior career*
Years	Team	Apps	(Gls)
2013–2016	Mafra	20	(0)
2016–2017	Guangzhou Evergrande	2	(0)
2017	→ Guizhou Hengfeng (loan)	18	(1)
2018	Guizhou Hengfeng	13	(1)
2019–2021	Wuhan FC	30	(0)
2021	→ Guangzhou City (loan)	18	(0)
2022	Changchun Yatai	8	(0)
2023–2024	Tianjin Jinmen Tiger	54	(1)
2025–	Chengdu Rongcheng	35	(0)

International career^{‡}
2013–2014	China U23	7	(0)
2025–	China	10	(0)
- * Club domestic league appearances and goals as of 31 August 2026 ‡ National team caps and goals as of 21:11, 16 May 2017 (UTC)

Han Pengfei (Chinese: 韩鹏飞; pinyin: Hán Péngfēi; Mandarin pronunciation: [xǎn pʰə̌ŋ féɪ]; born 28 April 1993) is a Chinese professional footballer who plays as a centre-back for Chinese Super League club Chengdu Rongcheng and the China national team.

== Club career ==
Han Pengfei started his football career when he joined Dalian Shide's youth academy in 2008. On 1 July 2013, he moved to Campeonato Nacional side Mafra after Dalian was dissolved. He made his debut for the club on 25 August 2013 in a 2–0 win against Atlético Riachense.

On 18 January 2016, Han transferred to Chinese Super League side Guangzhou Evergrande Taobao. On 26 July 2016, he made his debut for the club in a 2–1 away win against Beijing Guoan in the 2016 Chinese FA Cup, coming on as a substitute for Feng Xiaoting in the 81st minute. He made his Super League debut four days later on 30 July 2016, playing the whole match in a 2–1 home win over Henan Jianye.

On 24 February 2017, Han was loaned to Super League newcomer Guizhou Hengfeng Zhicheng for one season. On 3 March 2017, he made his debut for Guizhou in the first 2017 Chinese Super League match against Liaoning FC. He committed a foul to concede a penalty which was scored by James Chamanga, as Guizhou Zhicheng tied with Liaoning 1–1. On 14 October 2017, Han scored his first senior goal in a 3–2 home defeat to Changchun Yatai. On 28 February 2018, he made a permanent transfer to Guizhou Hengfeng with a one-year contract.

On 30 January 2019, Han transferred to Super League newcomer Wuhan Zall. He would make his debut on 1 March 2019 against Beijing Sinobo Guoan F.C. in a league game that ended in a 1-0 defeat. He would establish himself as a regular within the team, however he was part of the team that narrowly avoided relegation within the 2020 Chinese Super League campaign. On 12 April 2021, Han was loaned to fellow top tier club Guangzhou City for the 2021 Chinese Super League campaign. The following season would see him join Changchun Yatai before he moved to Tianjin Jinmen Tiger on 30 March 2023.

On 18 February 2025, Han joined Chinese Super League club Chengdu Rongcheng.

== Career statistics ==
As of 2 November 2024

Appearances and goals by club, season and competition
Club	Season	League			National Cup		League Cup		Continental		Other		Total	
Club	Season	Division	Apps	Goals	Apps	Goals	Apps	Goals	Apps	Goals	Apps	Goals	Apps	Goals
Mafra	2013–-14	Campeonato Nacional	6	0	0	0	0	0	–		–		6	0
Mafra	2014–15	Campeonato Nacional	8	0	0	0	0	0	–		–		8	0
Mafra	2015–16	Segunda Liga	6	0	0	0	0	0	–		–		6	0
Mafra	Total		20	0	0	0	0	0	0	0	0	0	20	0
Guangzhou Evergrande	2016	Chinese Super League	2	0	1	0	–		0	0	0 (Note: Appearance(s) in Chinese FA Super Cup)	0	3	0
Guizhou Hengfeng (loan)	2017	Chinese Super League	18	1	0	0	–		–		–		18	1
Guizhou Hengfeng	2018	Chinese Super League	13	1	3	0	–		–		–		16	1
Guizhou Hengfeng	Total		31	1	3	0	0	0	0	0	0	0	34	1
Wuhan Zall	2019	Chinese Super League	11	0	0	0	–		–		–		11	0
Wuhan Zall	2020	Chinese Super League	17	0	4	0	–		–		2 (Note: Appearance(s) in Promotion/Relegation play-offs)	0	23	0
Wuhan Zall	Total		28	0	4	0	0	0	0	0	2	0	34	0
Guangzhou City (loan)	2021	Chinese Super League	18	0	1	0	–		–		–		19	0
Changchun Yatai	2022	Chinese Super League	8	0	0	0	–		–		–		8	0
Tianjin Jinmen Tiger	2023	Chinese Super League	26	0	1	0	–		–		–		27	0
Tianjin Jinmen Tiger	2024	Chinese Super League	28	1	0	0	–		–		–		28	1
Tianjin Jinmen Tiger	Total		54	1	1	0	0	0	0	0	0	0	55	1
Career total			161	3	10	0	0	0	0	0	2	0	173	3

== Honours ==
=== Club ===
Mafra

- Campeonato Nacional: 2014-15

Guangzhou Evergrande

- Chinese Super League: 2016
- Chinese FA Cup: 2016
- Chinese FA Super Cup: 2016
