= Wang Dongsheng =

Chinese association football player

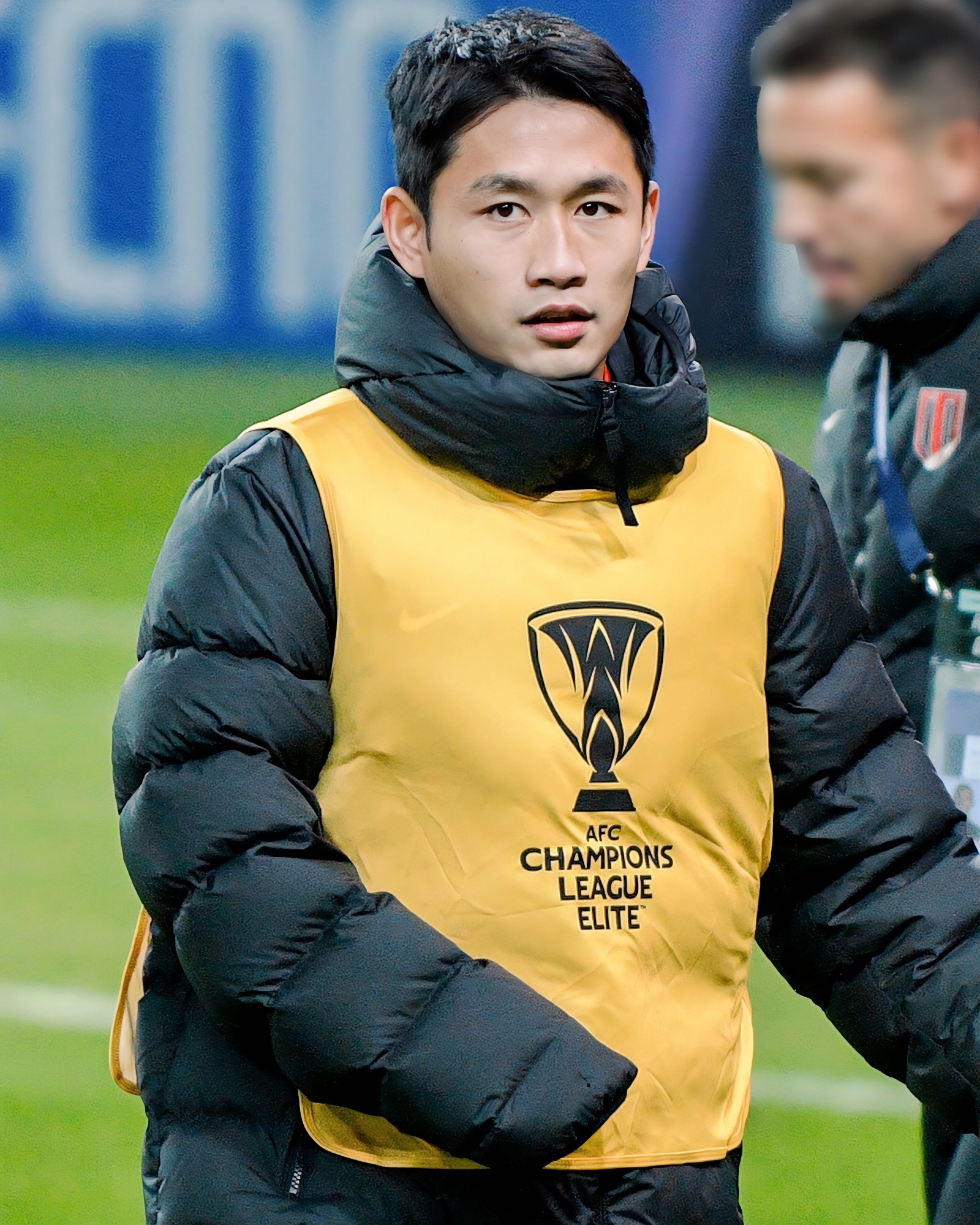
- Wang Dongsheng in November 2025

Personal information
- Date of birth: 12 May 1997 (age 29)
- Place of birth: Taizhou, Zhejiang, China
- Height: 1.74 m (5 ft 9 in)
- Position: Full-back

Team information
- Current team: Chengdu Rongcheng
- Number: 17

Youth career
- –2017: Hangzhou Greentown

Senior career*
Years	Team	Apps	(Gls)
2017–2024	Zhejiang FC	118	(1)
2018	→ Fujian Tianxin (loan)	23	(2)
2025–	Chengdu Rongcheng	26	(0)
- * Club domestic league appearances and goals as of 31 August 2026

Wang Dongsheng (Chinese: 王东升; born 12 May 1997) is a Chinese footballer currently playing as a full-back for Chengdu Rongcheng.

== Club career ==
In 2017 Wang Dongsheng would be promoted to the senior team of Hangzhou Greentown and would make his debut on 12 March 2017 in a league game against Nei Mongol Zhongyou in a 3-2 victory. The following season he would be loaned out to third tier club Fujian Tianxin to gain more playing time. On his return, he would start to establish himself as a regular member within the team as they renamed themselves Zhejiang Professional. He would then play a vital part as the club gained promotion to the top tier at the end of the 2021 campaign.

== Career statistics ==
As of 31 January 2023.

Club	Season	League			Cup		Continental		Other		Total	
Club	Season	Division	Apps	Goals	Apps	Goals	Apps	Goals	Apps	Goals	Apps	Goals
Zhejiang Professional	2017	China League One	8	0	1	0	–		–		9	0
Zhejiang Professional	2018	China League One	0	0	0	0	–		–		0	0
Zhejiang Professional	2019	China League One	14	1	2	1	–		–		16	2
Zhejiang Professional	2020	China League One	4	0	1	0	–		0 (Note: Appearances in Promotion/Relegation Play-offs)	0	5	0
Zhejiang Professional	2021	China League One	27	0	1	0	–		1	0	28	0
Zhejiang Professional	2022	Chinese Super League	21	0	4	1	–		–		25	1
Zhejiang Professional	Total		74	1	9	2	0	0	1	0	84	3
Fujian Tianxin (loan)	2018	China League Two	23	2	0	0	–		–		23	2
Career total			95	3	9	2	0	0	3	0	107	5
