= Ming-yang Yang =

Chinese footballer (born 1995)

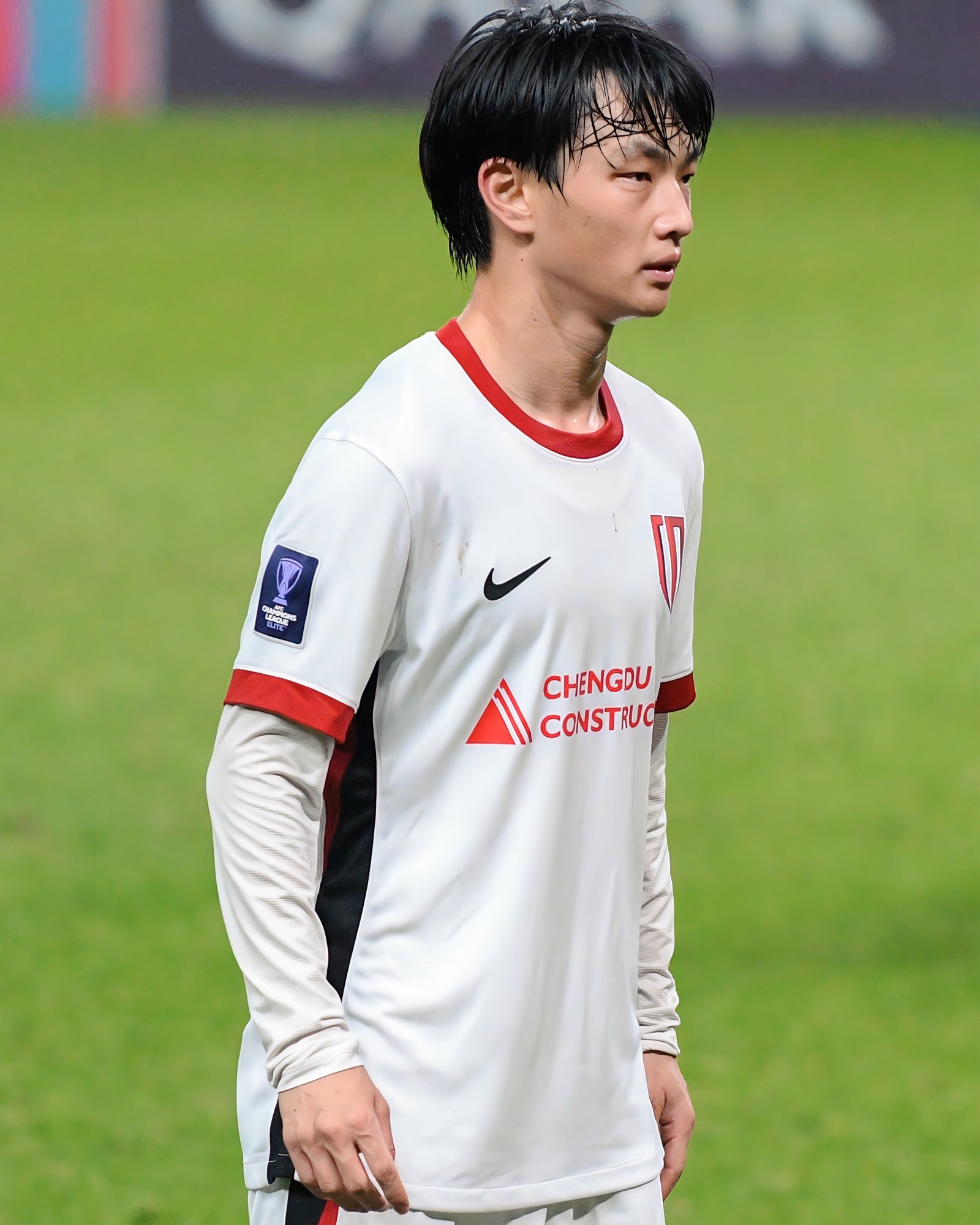
- Yang in November 2025

Personal information
- Full name: Yang Mingyang
- Birth name: Ming-yang Yang
- Date of birth: 11 July 1995 (age 31)
- Place of birth: Basel, Switzerland
- Height: 1.72 m (5 ft 7 1/2 in)
- Position: Midfielder

Team information
- Current team: Chengdu Rongcheng
- Number: 16

Youth career
- 2001–2010: Fribourg
- 2011–2012: Neuchâtel Xamax
- 2012–2013: Lausanne-Sport

Senior career*
Years	Team	Apps	(Gls)
2013–2017	Lausanne-Sport II	15	(0)
2013–2017	Lausanne-Sport	81	(1)
2017	FC Winterthur	3	(0)
2017	FC Winterthur II	1	(0)
2017–2020	Wolverhampton Wanderers	0	(0)
2018–2019	→ FC Jumilla (Loan)	29	(0)
2020–2021	Grasshoppers	0	(0)
2021–2024	Nantong Zhiyun	115	(10)
2025–	Chengdu Rongcheng	49	(4)

International career^{‡}
2010	Switzerland U16	4	(0)
2012	Switzerland U18	3	(0)
2013–2014	Switzerland U19	8	(0)
2014–2016	Switzerland U20	5	(0)
2026–	China	5	(0)
- * Club domestic league appearances and goals as of 31 August 2026 ‡ National team caps and goals as of 13:50, 25 September 2026 (UTC)

Ming-yang Yang
- Chinese: 杨明洋
Transcriptions
Standard Mandarin
- Hanyu Pinyin: Yáng Míngyáng

Yang Mingyang (Chinese: 杨明洋; pinyin: Yáng Míngyáng; né Ming-yang Yang; born 11 July 1995) is a professional footballer who plays as a midfielder for Chinese Super League club Chengdu Rongcheng. Born in Switzerland, he plays for the China national team.

== Early life ==
Yang was born in Basel, Switzerland to father Yang Zhihong, a professor of physiology at Fribourg University. His father originates from Wuhan, China, and after emigrating to Switzerland received a medical doctor's degree from Basel University in the 1990s. Yang began his football career with FC Fribourg youth team in 2001. He transferred to Neuchâtel Xamax in 2011 and moved to Lausanne-Sport in 2012.

== Club career ==
Yang was promoted to Lausanne-Sport's first team squad in the summer of 2013. On 14 July 2013, he made his senior debut in a 2–0 away defeat against FC Luzern.

After a short spell with FC Winterthur, on 31 August 2017, Yang joined English Championship club Wolverhampton Wanderers on a three-year deal for an undisclosed fee.

On 26 February 2021, Yang joined second tier Chinese football club Nantong Zhiyun. He would go on to make his debut in a league game on 25 April 2021 against Nanjing City in a 1–1 draw. This would be followed by his first goals for the club in a league game on 21 May 2021 against Nanjing City in a 3–1 victory. He would go on to establish himself within the team and helped the club gain promotion to the top tier at the end of the 2022 China League One season.

On 18 February 2025, Yang joined Chinese Super League club Chengdu Rongcheng.

== International career ==
On 19 May 2025, Yang's request to switch international allegiance to China PR was approved by FIFA.

On 24 September 2026, Yang made his debut for the senior China national team in a friendly against the Maldives.

== Career statistics ==
Statistics accurate as of match played 31 December 2022.

Club	Season	League			National Cup		Continental		Other		Total	
Club	Season	Division	Apps	Goals	Apps	Goals	Apps	Goals	Apps	Goals	Apps	Goals
Lausanne-Sport	2013–14	Swiss Super League	18	0	2	1	-		-		20	1
Lausanne-Sport	2014–15	Swiss Challenge League	27	0	1	0	-		-		28	0
Lausanne-Sport	2015–16	Swiss Challenge League	32	1	2	0	-		-		33	1
Lausanne-Sport	2016–17	Swiss Super League	4	0	1	0	-		-		5	0
Lausanne-Sport	Total		81	1	6	1	0	0	0	0	87	2
Team Vaud U21	2013–14	2. Liga Interregional	2	0	-		-		-		11	0
Team Vaud U21	2016–17	Swiss 1. Liga	13	0	-		-		-		13	0
Team Vaud U21	Total		15	0	0	0	0	0	0	0	15	0
FC Winterthur	2017–18	Swiss Challenge League	3	0	1	0	-		-		4	0
FC Winterthur U21	2017–18	Swiss 1. Liga	1	0	-		-		-		1	0
Wolverhampton Wanderers U23s	2017–18	PL 2, Div 2	3	0	-		-		0 (Note: Appearance(s) in EFL Trophy)	0	3	0
Wolverhampton Wanderers U23s	2018–19	PL 2, Div 2	1	0	-		-		0	0	1	0
Wolverhampton Wanderers U23s	2019–20	PL 2, Div 1	2	0	-		-		0	0	2	0
Wolverhampton Wanderers U23s	Total		6	0	0	0	0	0	0	0	6	0
FC Jumilla (Loan)	2018–19	Segunda División B	29	0	0	0	-		1 (Note: Appearance(s) in Segunda División B Relegation play-off)	0	30	0
Grasshoppers	2020–21	Swiss Challenge League	0	0	1	0	-		-		1	0
Grasshoppers U21	2020–21	Swiss 1. Liga	4	1	-		-		-		4	1
Nantong Zhiyun	2021	China League One	33	7	1	0	-		-		34	7
Nantong Zhiyun	2022	China League One	30	3	0	0	-		-		30	3
Nantong Zhiyun	Total		63	10	1	0	0	0	0	0	64	10
Career total			202	12	9	1	0	0	1	0	212	13
