= Rômulo (footballer, born October 1995) =

Brazilian footballer (born 1995)

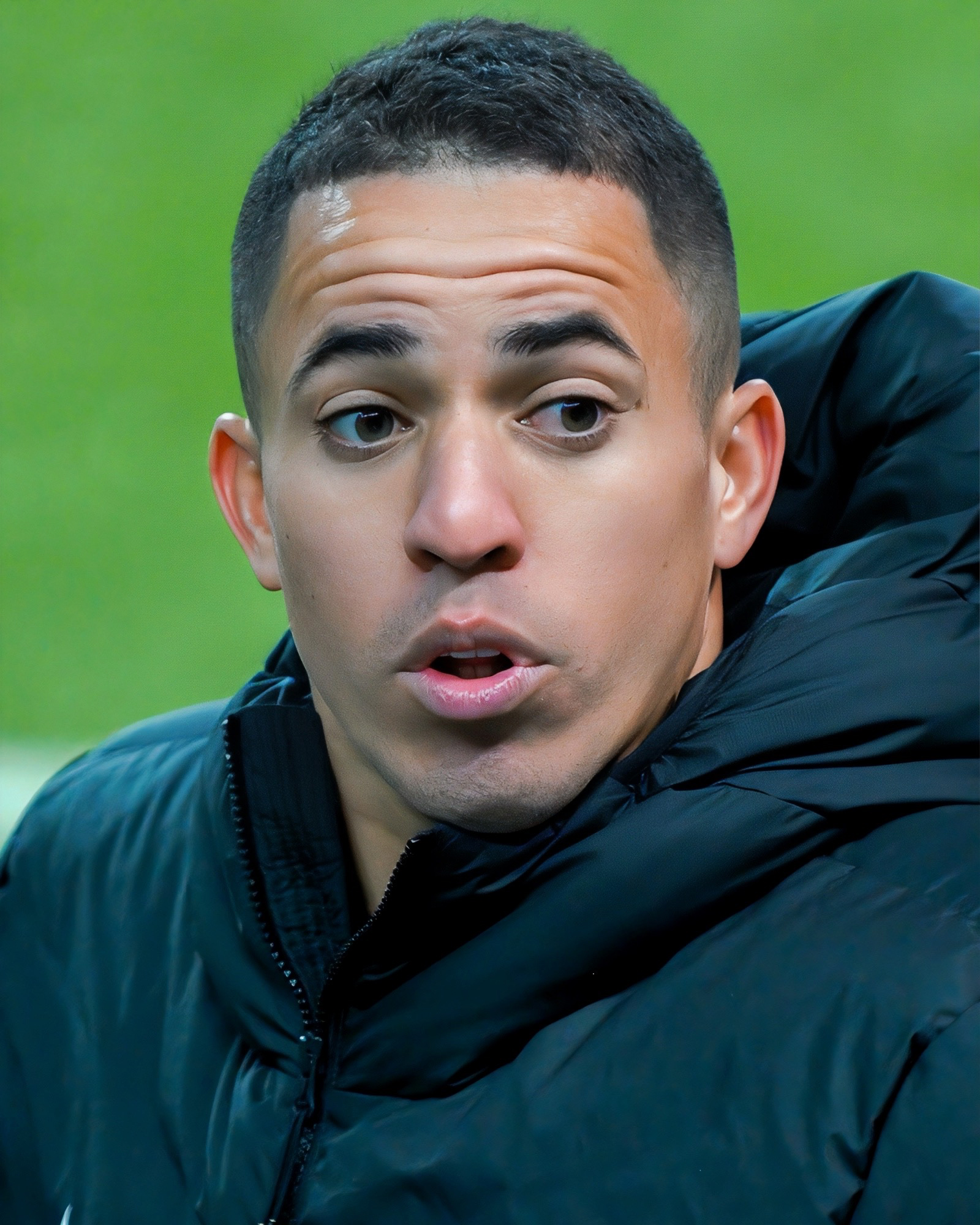
- Rômulo in 2025

Personal information
- Full name: Rômulo José Pacheco da Silva
- Date of birth: 27 October 1995 (age 31)
- Place of birth: Recife, Brazil
- Height: 1.69 m (5 ft 6 1/2 in)
- Position: Midfielder

Team information
- Current team: Chengdu Rongcheng
- Number: 10

Youth career
- 2011–2014: Bahia

Senior career*
Years	Team	Apps	(Gls)
2014–2017	Bahia	55	(6)
2016	→ Bragantino (loan)	2	(0)
2017	→ Busan IPark (loan)	21	(1)
2018–2021	Busan IPark	94	(28)
2021–	Chengdu Rongcheng	138	(34)

International career
2015	Brazil U23	5	(2)
Medal record
Representing Brazil
Men's Football
Pan American Games
Bronze medal – third place	2015 Toronto	Team competition
- * Club domestic league appearances and goals as of 8 November 2026

Rômulo José Pacheco da Silva (born 27 October 1995), simply known as Rômulo, is a Brazilian footballer who plays for Chengdu Rongcheng as a midfielder.

== Club career ==
Rômulo was born in Recife, Pernambuco, and graduated with Bahia's youth setup. On 16 November 2014 he made his first team – and Série A – debut, coming on as a second-half substitute in a 1–2 home loss against Corinthians.

On 10 February 2015 Rômulo renewed his contract until 2018.

On 6 February 2017, Rômulo signed with Korean second division side Busan IPark on a one year loan deal. After a successful debut season in Korea, Rômulo signed a three-year contract with the club. In both 2018 and 2019, Rômulo was named in the official K League 2 team of the season. In the final game of the 2019 season, Rômulo scored a 77th minute penalty to give Busan the lead in the promotion-relegation playoff final against local rivals Gyeongnam FC. Busan went on to win the game 2-0 and achieve promotion to the K League 1.

On 15 April 2021 Rômulo would join Chinese second tier football club Chengdu Rongcheng. In his debut seasons with the club he would establish himself as a regular within the team and aid them to promotion at the end of the 2021 league campaign.

== Career statistics ==
As of match played 8 November 2026

Appearances and goals by club, season and competition
Club	Season	League			State League		Cup		Continental		Other		Total	
Club	Season	Division	Apps	Goals	Apps	Goals	Apps	Goals	Apps	Goals	Apps	Goals	Apps	Goals
Bahia	2014	Série A	3	1	0	0	0	0	—		—		3	1
Bahia	2015	Série B	22	1	10	0	4	0	1	0	9 (Note: Appearance(s) in Copa do Nordeste)	2	46	3
Bahia	2016	Série B	0	0	9	2	2	0	—		2	0	13	2
Bahia	Total		25	2	19	2	6	0	1	0	11	2	62	6
Bragantino (loan)	2016	Série B	2	0	0	0	0	0	—		—		2	0
Busan IPark (loan)	2017	K League 2	21	1	—		5	0	—		2 (Note: Appearance(s) in K League 1 Relegation play-offs)	1	28	2
Busan IPark	2018	K League 2	36	10	—		3	2	—		2	1	41	13
Busan IPark	2019	K League 2	32	14	—		0	0	—		2	1	34	15
Busan IPark	2020	K League 1	26	4	—		0	0	—		—		26	4
Busan IPark	Total		94	28	—		3	2	—		4	2	101	32
Chengdu Rongcheng	2021	China League One	12	4	—		1	0	—		2 (Note: Appearance(s) in CSL Relegation play-offs)	1	15	5
Chengdu Rongcheng	2022	Chinese Super League	32	12	—		0	0	—		—		32	12
Chengdu Rongcheng	2023	Chinese Super League	11	3	—		0	0	—		—		11	3
Chengdu Rongcheng	2024	Chinese Super League	24	6	—		3	0	—		—		27	6
Chengdu Rongcheng	2025	Chinese Super League	29	8	—		3	3	6	0	—		38	11
Chengdu Rongcheng	2026	Chinese Super League	30	1	—		1	0	2	0	—		33	1
Chengdu Rongcheng	Total		138	34	—		8	3	8	0	2	1	156	38
Career total			280	65	19	2	22	5	9	0	19	6	349	78
