= Jian Tao =

Chinese footballer (born 2001)

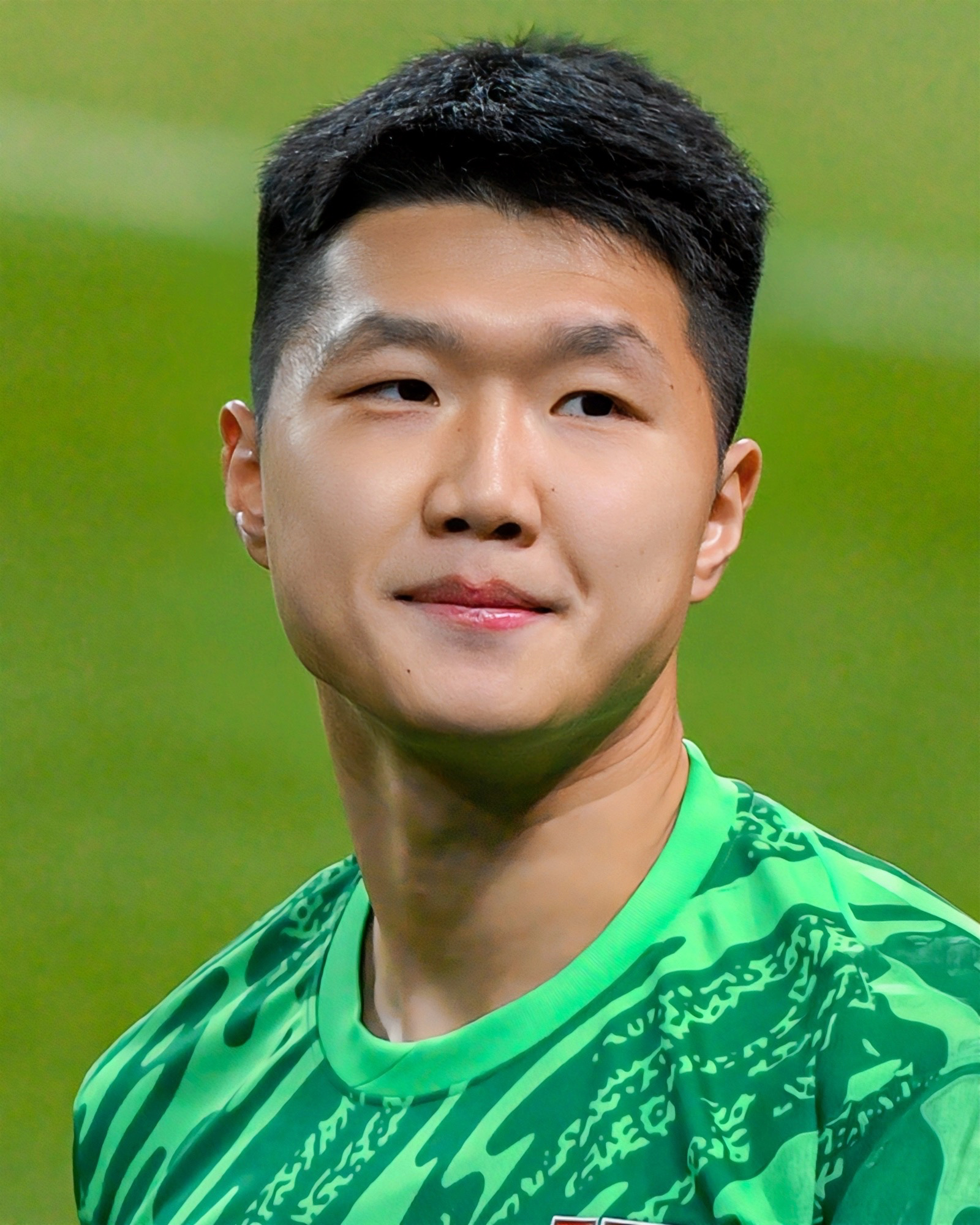
- Jian Tao in November 2025

Personal information
- Date of birth: 22 June 2001 (age 25)
- Place of birth: Guangyuan, Sichuan, China
- Height: 1.85 m (6 ft 1 in)
- Position: Goalkeeper

Team information
- Current team: Chengdu Rongcheng
- Number: 1

Youth career
- 2012–2013: Chengdu Derui
- 2013–2019: Chengdu FA
- 2019–2020: Olympique Lyonnais
- 2020–2021: Villefranche Beaujolais

Senior career*
Years	Team	Apps	(Gls)
2021–2022	Villefranche Beaujolais	0	(0)
2023–	Chengdu Rongcheng	37	(0)

International career
2016–2017	China U15		
2018	China U17		
2019	China U19		
2022–2023	China U22		
- * Club domestic league appearances and goals as of 9 March 2026

Jian Tao (Chinese: 蹇韬; pinyin: Jiǎn Tāo; born 22 June 2001) is a Chinese professional footballer who plays as a goalkeeper for Chinese Super League club Chengdu Rongcheng.

== Club career ==
Born in Guangyuan, Sichuan, Jian started his career with the Chengdu Derui football training school in 2012. He was scouted by the Chengdu Football Association, and joined the representative team in 2013. In 2018 he began training with French Ligue 1 side Olympique Lyonnais, and signed officially the following year.

After a year and a half with Lyon, Jian moved to satellite club Villefranche Beaujolais. However, after only one appearance for the club, coming off the bench in a 12–0 Coupe de France win over US Mozac, he was released by the club in July 2022.

=== Chengdu Rongcheng ===
Following his release, he trained with Chinese Super League side Chengdu Rongcheng in January 2023, before going on to sign permanently with the club on 7 April 2023.

On 4 August 2023, Jian made his Chinese Super league debut for Chengdu in a 3–2 away defeat at Qingdao Hainiu. He then immediately replaced Zhang Yan as the team's first-choice goalkeeper and started in all of the final 11 league matches of the season, keeping 4 clean sheets.

== International career ==
Jian has represented China from under-15 to under-21 level.

On 12 December 2023, Jian was named in China's squad for the 2023 AFC Asian Cup in Qatar. He was the only player in the squad with no previous national team experience and his selection led to controversy among fans not because they question his ability but because of manager Aleksandar Janković's decision to field 4 goalkeepers in the 26-man squad.

== Career statistics ==
=== Club ===
As of match played 9 December 2025.

Appearances and goals by club, season and competition
Club	Season	League			Cup		Continental		Other		Total	
Club	Season	Division	Apps	Goals	Apps	Goals	Apps	Goals	Apps	Goals	Apps	Goals
Villefranche Beaujolais	2020–21	Championnat National	0	0	1 (Note: Appearances in the Coupe de France preliminary rounds)	0	–		0	0	1	0
Villefranche Beaujolais	2021–22	Championnat National	0	0	0	0	–		0	0	0	0
Villefranche Beaujolais	Total		0	0	1	0	0	0	0	0	1	0
Chengdu Rongcheng	2023	Chinese Super League	11	0	0	0	–		–		11	0
Chengdu Rongcheng	2024	Chinese Super League	23	0	4	0	–		–		27	0
Chengdu Rongcheng	2025	Chinese Super League	3	0	0	0	5	0	–		8	0
Chengdu Rongcheng	Total		37	0	4	0	5	0	0	0	46	0
Career total			37	0	5	0	5	0	0	0	47	0
