= Mutellip Iminqari =

Chinese footballer (born 2004)

Personal information
- Date of birth: 18 March 2004 (age 22)
- Place of birth: Kashgar, Xinjiang, China
- Height: 1.86 m (6 ft 1 in)
- Position: Midfielder

Team information
- Current team: Chengdu Rongcheng
- Number: 29

Youth career
- 2018–2021: Chengdu Derui

Senior career*
Years	Team	Apps	(Gls)
2022–	Chengdu Rongcheng	49	(4)
2025	→ Qingdao West Coast (loan)	12	(0)

International career
2022–2023	China U19	4	(2)
2023–2026	China U23	26	(1)
Medal record
Men's football
Representing China
AFC U-23 Asian Cup
Runner-up	2026 Saudi Arabia	Team
Asian Games
Bronze medal – third place	2026 Aichi–Nagoya	Team
- * Club domestic league appearances and goals as of 31 August 2026

Mutellip Iminqari (Chinese: 木塔力甫·依明卡日; pinyin: Mùtǎlìfǔ Yīmíngkǎrì, Uyghur: مۇتەللىپ ئىمىنقارى; born 18 March 2004) is a Chinese professional footballer who plays as a midfielder for Chinese Super League club Chengdu Rongcheng.

== Club career ==
Born in Xinjiang, Mutellip joined the Chengdu FA's academy, Chengdu Derui, in 2018. He represented the Hubei regional team in 2020 and 2021, before signing with Chinese Super League side Chengdu Rongcheng in April 2022.

He made his debut for Chengdu Rongcheng on 26 June 2022, against Shenzhen FC, and scored his first goal for the club the following month, in a 2–1 win over Tianjin Jinmen Tiger.

On 16 July 2025, Mutellip was loaned out to Chinese Super League club Qingdao West Coast.

== International career ==
Mutellip has represented China at under-19 and under-22 level.

== Career statistics ==
=== Club ===
As of 25 February 2023.

Appearances and goals by club, season and competition
Club	Season	League			Cup		Continental		Other		Total	
Club	Season	Division	Apps	Goals	Apps	Goals	Apps	Goals	Apps	Goals	Apps	Goals
Chengdu Rongcheng	2022	Chinese Super League	22	3	2 (Note: Appearances in the Chinese FA Cup)	2	0	0	0	0	24	5
Career total			22	3	2	2	0	0	0	0	24	5

== Honours ==
China U23

- AFC U-23 Asian Cup runner-up: 2026
