= Chengdu Rongcheng F.C. =

Chinese football club

Chengdu Rongcheng 成都蓉城
- Full name: Chengdu Rongcheng Football Club 成都蓉城足球俱乐部
- Founded: 20 March 2018; 8 years ago
- Ground: Phoenix Hill Football Stadium, Chengdu, Sichuan
- Capacity: 50,695
- Owner(s): Chengdu Better City Investment Group Co., Ltd.
- Head coach: Vacant
- League: Chinese Super League
- 2026: Chinese Super League, 2nd of 16
Home colours	Away colours

Chengdu Rongcheng Football Club (Chinese: 成都蓉城足球俱乐部; pinyin: Chéngdū Róngchéng Zúqiú Jùlèbù; lit. 'Chengdu Hibiscus City F.C.') is a Chinese professional football club based in Chengdu, Sichuan, that competes in the Chinese Super League, the top tier of Chinese football. Chengdu Rongcheng plays its home matches at Phoenix Hill Football Stadium, located within Jinniu District. The club's founder and their majority shareholder is Chengdu Better City Investment Group Co., Ltd. The name Rongcheng derives from the Chinese expression literally translated as 'Hibiscus City', one of the nicknames for the city of Chengdu.

== History ==
The club was founded as Chengdu Better City Football Club on 20 March 2018, by Chengdu Better City Investment Group Co., Ltd. on the ashes of the dissolved Chengdu Qbao. With the support of the Chengdu Football Association and the appointment of José Carlos Granero as their head coach, the club would start their journey playing within the Chengdu FA Champions League. After winning the division, the club would participate within the 2018 Chinese Champions League, where they came runners-up to Taizhou Yuanda and achieved promotion to the third tier of the Chinese football pyramid. Consecutive promotions would follow after finishing as runners-up to Shenyang Urban, followed by a promotion to the second-tier (China League One) at the end of the 2019 China League Two season.

=== Top tier league ===
In the 2020 China League One campaign, the club came fourth in their debut season in the second tier and head coach José Carlos Granero decided not to renew his contract with the club, despite his achievements with the team. South Korean coach Seo Jung-won would be appointed as their new head coach for the start of the 2021 China League One campaign. On 15 January 2021, the club changed their name to Chengdu Rongcheng Football Club to comply with the Chinese Football Association's request of teams having neutral names. On 12 January 2022, Chengdu was promoted to the Chinese Super League after beating Dalian Pro 2–1 on aggregate in the promotion/relegation play-offs.

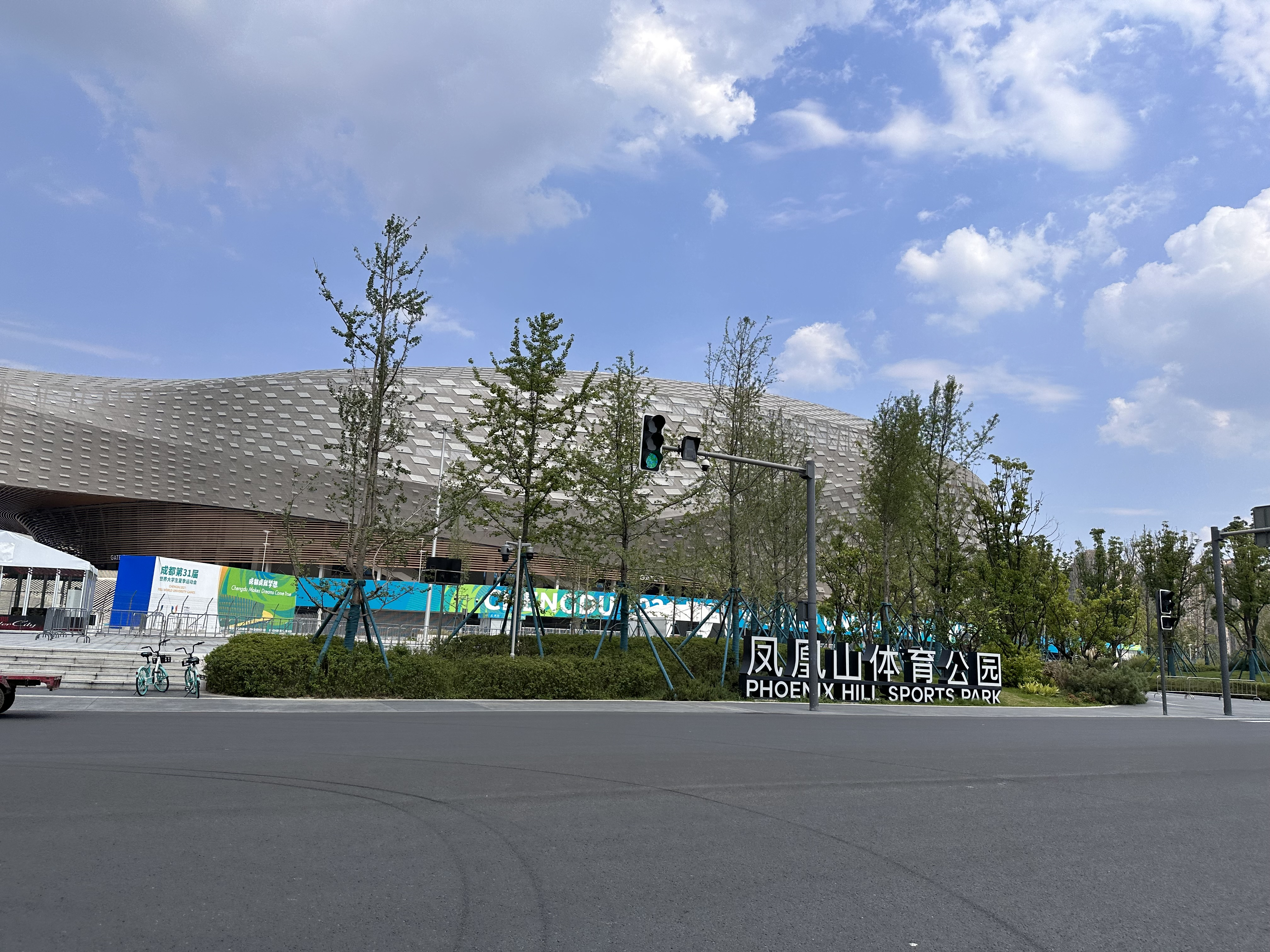
Phoenix Hill Sports Park Football Stadium, the home ground of Chengdu Rongcheng since 2022

Preparation for Chengdu Rongcheng's 2022 debut Chinese Super League season under Seo Jung-won began as the club signed the likes of Austrian centre-back Richard Windbichler, Chinese Taipei midfielder Tim Chow, both on free contracts, South Korean midfielder Kim Min-woo, among several other pre-season winter signings. Chengdu Rongcheng were winless for their opening 8 games, including a 6-game drawing streak. Chengdu grabbed their first ever CSL win on 8 July at a centralised neutral venue in Meizhou, Guangdong, beating Tianjin Jinmen Tiger 2–1. Chengdu would go on to win their next four games on the bounce as they propelled themselves to 6th place, 13 games in, until their third loss of the season came against a competitive Shandong Taishan side, who beat them 2–1 on 21 August 2022. It then went on to be a continuous period of highs as Chengdu were only beaten 2 times in the next 22 games, until the end of the 2022 Chinese Super League season. That period included a 14-game unbeaten league run that further extended into the following season, new incomings as skilled Brazilian Matheus Saldanha had joined on loan for the rest of the season, and two matches in the Chinese FA Cup. Two 3–0 wins over Hebei and fellow newly promoted Meizhou Hakka advanced them to a two-legged quarter-final tie where they were eliminated by two 0–4 defeats to Shanghai Port in January of the following calendar year, 2023. Chengdu Rongcheng finished 5th in the 2022 season on 65 points, narrowly missing out on AFC Champions League football on head-to-head points. The stand-outs and surprise packages of the season were Hu Hetao and Mutellip Iminqari who broke onto the scene under manager Seo Jung-won, and played 25 games and 24 games in all competitions respectively. On 23 December 2022, Chengdu Rongcheng moved to their new and current home, the Phoenix Hill Football Stadium, and were victorious for their first three games of playing at home there that season.

=== AFC Champions League Elite debut ===
Chengdu Rongcheng ended the 2024 Chinese Super League in third place where the club was given a berth to play in the 2025–26 AFC Champions League Elite qualifying play-offs, they would face off against Thailand club Bangkok United on 12 August 2025 at home where Chengdu ended up winning 3–0 thus qualifying to the group stage being the club first ever continental tournament that they have participated. On 17 September, Chengdu played their first continental match but fell to a 2–1 defeat to Korean club Ulsan HD.

== Players ==
=== First-team squad ===
As of July 2026

Note: Flags indicate national team as defined under FIFA eligibility rules; some limited exceptions apply. Players may hold more than one non-FIFA nationality.

No.	Pos.	Nation	Player
1	GK	CHN	Jian Tao
2	DF	CHN	Hu Hetao
3	DF	HKG	Alexander Jojo
4	DF	CHN	He Yiran
5	MF	BRA	Matheus Jussa
6	MF	CHN	Feng Zhuoyi
7	FW	CHN	Wei Shihao
9	FW	BRA	Felipe Silva
10	MF	BRA	Rômulo
11	FW	BRA	Wellington Silva
15	GK	CHN	Ran Weifeng
16	MF	CHN	Yang Mingyang
17	DF	CHN	Wang Dongsheng
18	DF	CHN	Han Pengfei
19	DF	CHN	Dong Yanfeng
20	FW	CHN	Wang Ziming
21	MF	CHN	Chen Shihan

No.	Pos.	Nation	Player
22	DF	CHN	Li Yang
23	MF	CHN	Liao Lisheng
24	FW	CHN	Tang Chuang
25	MF	CHN	Mirahmetjan Muzepper
27	FW	CHN	Behram Abduweli
28	DF	RUS	Yegor Sorokin
29	MF	CHN	Mutellip Iminqari
32	GK	CHN	Liu Dianzuo
39	MF	CHN	Gan Chao
45	FW	CHN	Ezimet Qeyser
48	MF	CHN	Li Moyu
52	FW	CHN	Shuai Weihao
55	GK	CHN	Peng Haochen
58	MF	CHN	Liao Rongxiang
59	DF	CHN	Wang Ziteng

=== B-team squad ===
As of July 2026

Note: Flags indicate national team as defined under FIFA eligibility rules; some limited exceptions apply. Players may hold more than one non-FIFA nationality.

No.	Pos.	Nation	Player
6	FW	CHN	Xu Zhenghang
7	MF	CHN	Zhang Zili
11	MF	CHN	Chen Xiaohan
15	FW	CHN	Liu Zhetao
16	MF	CHN	Yao Younan
17	DF	CHN	Dai Wenhao
21	MF	CHN	Cui Xinglong (on loan from Guangdong GZ-Power)
23	MF	CHN	Li Wenle (on loan from Guangdong GZ-Power)
27	MF	CHN	Wang Yueheng
29	MF	CHN	Yao Zixuan
31	MF	CHN	Qin Wanzhun
34	MF	CHN	Wang Jintian
36	GK	CHN	Tang Yixuan
37	DF	CHN	Du Yijinwu
38	FW	CHN	Huang Zhenhang
40	GK	CHN	Wang Haoqin

No.	Pos.	Nation	Player
41	MF	CHN	Huang Junjie
43	MF	CHN	Zhang Kongzhi
44	DF	CHN	Lobsang
45	FW	CHN	Ezimet Qeyser
46	MF	CHN	Wu Jiayi
47	MF	CHN	Zhang Ziwei
48	MF	CHN	Li Moyu
49	MF	CHN	Xu Hong
51	MF	CHN	Li Ke
52	FW	CHN	Shuai Weihao
53	DF	CHN	Chen Siliang
55	GK	CHN	Peng Haochen
56	FW	CHN	Yi Yuchong
57	DF	CHN	Lou Haoran
59	DF	CHN	Wang Ziteng
60	GK	CHN	Tang Zicheng

=== Out on loan ===
Note: Flags indicate national team as defined under FIFA eligibility rules; some limited exceptions apply. Players may hold more than one non-FIFA nationality.

No.	Pos.	Nation	Player

== Coaching staff ==
Position	Name
Head coach	Vacant
Assistant coach	(Australia) Diogo Ferreira (Spain) Andrés Carrasco (China) Gan Rui (China) Hao Junmin
Goalkeeping coach	(Italy) Antonello Brambilla
Fitness coach	(Australia) Alex Calder
Team manager	(China) Qun Wei
Performance Analyst	(Australia) Harry Reading

== B-team Coaching staff ==
Position	Name
Head coach	(China) Xu Jianye
Assistant coach	(China) Shen Zhaolin
Assistant coach	(China) Ruan Ruofei
Assistant coach	(China) Yi Fan
Goalkeeping coach	(China) Bi Jiantao
Fitness coach	(China) Gan Yingbo

== Managerial history ==
- (Spain) José Carlos Granero (2018–2020)
- (South Korea) Seo Jung-won (2021–2025)
- (Australia) John Aloisi (2026)

== Results ==
All-time league rankings

As of the end of 2025 season.

Year	Div	Pld	W	D	L	GF	GA	GD	Pts	Pos.	FA Cup	Super Cup	AFC	Att./G	Stadium
2018	4	3	3	0	0	26	2	24	9	RU	DNQ	DNQ	DNQ		Chengdu Longquanyi Football Stadium
2019	3	30	20	7	3	53	12	41	67	RU	R2	DNQ	DNQ		Chengdu Longquanyi Football Stadium
2020	2	15	10	2	3	20	14	6	32	4	R2	DNQ	DNQ		Chengdu Longquanyi Football Stadium
2021	2	34	21	8	5	81	28	53	71	4^{1}	R16	DNQ	DNQ		Chengdu Longquanyi Football Stadium
2022	1	34	18	11	5	49	28	21	65	5	QF	DNQ	DNQ		Phoenix Hill Sports Park Football Stadium
2023	1	30	15	8	7	51	32	19	53	4	R3	DNQ	DNQ	34,993	Phoenix Hill Sports Park Football Stadium
2024	1	30	18	5	7	65	31	34	59	3	SF	DNQ	DNQ	39,818	Phoenix Hill Sports Park Football Stadium
2025	1	30	17	9	4	60	28	32	60	3	SF	DNQ	Group	40,820	Phoenix Hill Sports Park Football Stadium

- ^1 Promoted by beating Dalian Pro in the promotion play-offs.

Key

	China top division
	China second division
	China third division
	China fourth division
W	Winners
RU	Runners-up
3	Third place
	Relegated

- Pld = Played
- W = Games won
- D = Games drawn
- L = Games lost
- F = Goals for
- A = Goals against
- Pts = Points
- Pos = Final position
- DNQ = Did not qualify
- DNE = Did not enter
- NH = Not Held
- – = Does Not Exist
- R1 = Round 1
- R2 = Round 2
- R3 = Round 3
- R4 = Round 4
- F = Final
- SF = Semi-finals
- QF = Quarter-finals
- R16 = Round of 16
- Group = Group stage
- GS2 = Second Group stage
- QR1 = First Qualifying Round
- QR2 = Second Qualifying Round
- QR3 = Third Qualifying Round

=== Continental results ===
All results list Chengdu's goal tally first.

Season	Competition	Round	Opposition	Home	Away	Aggregate
2025–26	AFC Champions League Elite	Play-off round	(Thailand) Bangkok United	3–0		
2025–26	AFC Champions League Elite	League stage	(South Korea) Ulsan HD	—N/a	1–2	10th out of 12
2025–26	AFC Champions League Elite	League stage	(South Korea) Gangwon FC	1–0	—N/a	10th out of 12
2025–26	AFC Champions League Elite	League stage	(Malaysia) Johor Darul Ta'zim	0–2	—N/a	10th out of 12
2025–26	AFC Champions League Elite	League stage	(South Korea) FC Seoul	—N/a	0–0	10th out of 12
2025–26	AFC Champions League Elite	League stage	(Japan) Sanfrecce Hiroshima	1–1	—N/a	10th out of 12
2025–26	AFC Champions League Elite	League stage	(Japan) Vissel Kobe	—N/a	2–2	10th out of 12
2025–26	AFC Champions League Elite	League stage	(Thailand) Buriram United	0–1	—N/a	10th out of 12
2025–26	AFC Champions League Elite	League stage	(Japan) Machida Zelvia	—N/a	2–3	10th out of 12
2027–28
