= 2025 Beijing Guoan F.C. season =

Beijing Guoan F.C.'s 61st season in football competition

Beijing Guoan
2025 season
- CEO: Zhou Jinhui
- General Manager: Li Ming
- Manager: Quique Setién (until 5 October); Ramiro Amarelle (caretaker) (from 7 October to 21 December)
- Stadium: Workers' Stadium
- Super League: 4th
- FA Cup: Winners
- AFC Champions League Two: Group stage
- Top goalscorer: League: Fábio Abreu (28); All: Fábio Abreu (33)
- Highest home attendance: 62,291 vs Shanghai Shenhua (19 July 2025, Super League)
- Lowest home attendance: 20,071 vs Cong An Hanoi (18 September 2025, AFC Champions League Two)
- Average home league attendance: 44,975
- Biggest win: 7–0 vs Yunnan Yukun (Home, 20 August 2025, CFA Cup Semi-final)
- Biggest defeat: 0–6 vs Shandong Taishan (Away, 31 August 2025, Super League)

The 2025 season was Beijing Guoan F.C.'s 61st season in Chinese football competitions. This season marks the club's 22nd consecutive season in the Chinese Super League since the league's inaugural season in 2004, and it is the club's 35th consecutive season in the top-flight of Chinese football. It covered a period from 1 January 2025 to 31 December 2025.

Guoan finished 4th in the domestic league, and won the season's edition of the Chinese FA Cup. Guoan participated in the group stage of the 2025–26 AFC Champions League Two, but was eliminated from the next round of the competition.

== Summary ==
=== Pre-season ===
On 10 December 2024, Guoan announced that head coach Ricardo Soares had left the club. On the same day, the club appointed Quique Setién as head coach for the 2025 season. Setién said that he would like the team to play possession-based attacking football, and that he believed that the team should not be 20 points behind league leaders as it was in the 2024 season.

The team began a two-week pre-season training in Kunming starting on 15 December, with players out on loan returning to participate as well. Newly appointed head coach Setién was not present during this phase with training instead being led by assistant coach and Spanish former beach soccer player Ramiro Amarelle.

On 21 December 2024, Guoan suffered a temporary transfer ban from FIFA that prohibited incoming player transfers pending the result of certain financial disputes. The ban was lifted on 30 December 2024 following the resolution of the financial dispute, and Guoan was free to continue player transfer activities.

On 27 December 2024, Guoan played a training match in Kunming against Shandong Taishan's U-18 team. As the opponent was much younger, Guoan played with a 10-man team. Guoan won 4–0 with two goals from Yan Yu and one each from Wang Ziming and Fang Hao. The training camp officially concluded on 28 December 2024.

News reports on 31 December 2024 confirmed that the club had signed a 2-year contract extension with Zhang Xizhe and 1-year extensions with Wang Gang and Chi Zhongguo, respectively. Bai Yang, Nebijan Muhmet, and Cao Yongjing's contracts were also extended by the club. It was also reported that Samuel Adegbenro, Mamadou Traoré, and Zhang Chengdong's contracts would not be extended and that the players had left the club. The club also announced the retirement of long-time captain Yu Dabao and his subsequent transition to youth coaching roles within the club. On 7 January 2025, Li Ke announced his departure from Beijing Guoan after a six-season-long spell. The following day, Shanghai Shenhua announced Li Ke's arrival at the club on a free transfer. Ahead of the season, long-term club youth players including He Xiaoqiang, Ruan Qilong, Ma Yujun, Duan Dezhi, and others also left the club.

Guoan began its second phase of winter training in Haikou on 6 January 2025 under head coach Setién. This phase of training was set to last 21 days with multiple friendlies. The first friendly took place on 14 January against Changchun Yatai, which Guoan won 2–0 through a penalty from Zhang Xizhe and a goal from Jiang Wenhao. On 17 January, Guoan played its second training camp friendly against China League One club Chongqing Tonglianglong. Abreu, Fang Hao, Zhang Xizhe, and Nebijan helped Guoan to a 4–2 win. On 21 January, Guoan lost 2–3 to Dalian Yingbo in the team's third training match. Abreu and an opposition goal put Guoan up in the first half, but the team conceded three in the second half after rotating. Guoan won its fourth training match, played against old rival Shanghai Shenhua, 4–1 thanks to two goals from Fang Hao and one each from Feng Boxuan and Zhang Yuning. Former Guoan player Gao Tianyi scored Shenhua's lone goal. Guoan's last training match before the team's Lunar New Year break took place on 26 January against Nantong Zhiyun. Lin Liangming scored the lone goal, with Guoan winning 1–0.

On 30 January, Turkish club İstanbul Başakşehir announced that Chinese center-back Wu Shaocong was leaving the Turkish side and joining Beijing Guoan. The club announced 3 more midfield transfers to Guoan on 2 February: Serginho from Changchun Yatai, Dawhan from Gamba Osaka, and Li Ruiyue from Shanghai Jiading Huilong.

The team regrouped on 1 February and traveled to Thailand to begin its third phase of winter training. Guoan lost the first training match in Thailand against Hwaseong FC, a K League 2 club, 1–2 on 4 February. Guoan played fellow CSL team Shenzhen Peng City on 8 February in its second training match and won 4–2. Abreu scored all four goals for Guoan. On 13 February, Guoan tied Thai League 1 club Ratchaburi F.C. 1–1 in another training match thanks to a goal from Abreu. Guoan's final pre-season training match took place a day later against China League One side Liaoning Tieren. Guoan drew the game 1–1 with a goal from Zhang Yuning.

On 18 February, the last day of the winter transfer window, Guoan announced the signing of Serbian defender Uroš Spajić from Red Star Belgrade. The transfer came after the club received confirmation that Serginho's naturalization process is completed and he would be registered as a Chinese national.

Guoan's participation in the 2025–26 AFC Champions League Two was officially confirmed on 19 February. As a result of finishing 4th in the league in 2024, Guoan would qualify for the competition provided that Shandong Taishan, which finished behind Guoan and could not qualify via its domestic league rankings, did not win the 2024–25 AFC Champions League Elite. On 19 February, Shandong Taishan withdrew from the group stages of the 2024–25 AFC Champions League Elite as a result of sustained political controversy stirred by its fans displaying images of former South Korean dictator Chun Doo-hwan and current North Korean leader Kim Jong-un in an AFC Champions League Elite match against K League 1 side Gwangju, cementing Guoan's place in continental competition for the 2025–26 season.

=== February ===
Guoan played its first league game of the season on 22 February away from home against newly promoted side Yunnan Yukun. After a dull first half, Guoan upped the pressure and scored through Abreu in the 53rd minute with Nebijan Muhmet providing the assist. Guoan doubled its lead in the 79th minute as Cao Yongjing deftly touched a rebounded corner. In the 100th minute, Bai Yang was shown a second yellow card and was sent off. Ultimately, Guoan secured its opening match with a 2–0 win.

=== March ===
Guoan's second game of the season was played away from home on 1 March against old rivals Shanghai Shenhua. Guoan's new central defense signing Uroš Spajić was named in the starting lineup in his debut for the team. In the 11th minute, Guoan opened the scoring through Lin Liangming's header in a set piece situation. However, after 2 separate Guoan defensive plays were VAR-reviewed, the tide of the match shifted against Guoan. In the 38th minute, Wu Xi leveled for Shenhua after lobbing Guoan's keeper. In the 3rd minute of added time in the first half, a Han Jiaqi mistake gave away a penalty, through which Shenhua gained a 2–1 lead before halftime. Setién made several changes at the half, including debuting Guoan's other center-back signing Wu Shaocong. In the 81st minute, Zhang Yuan, who was substituted on at the beginning of the second half, was sent off after receiving a second yellow card. Despite playing a man down, Guoan leveled the game in the 93rd minute with Li Lei crossing the ball for Abreu, whose header ricocheted into the net after hitting the crossbar and then against the back of Shenhua's keeper Bao Yaxiong. The game ended in a 2–2 draw.

On 15 March, Guoan played a training match against Qingdao Hainiu to keep players sharp during the international break. Guoan won 2–1- with Fang Hao scoring a double. However, Wang Gang suffered a broken rib and Zhang Yuan a muscle strain in the match, resulting in both players being sidelined. He Yupeng was also injured around the same time, having fractured his foot in training.

On 17 March, Serginho, now known in Chinese as Sai Erjini'ao, was officially called up by the Chinese national team ahead of a World Cup qualification match against Saudi Arabia, confirming his naturalization as a Chinese player.

On 19 March, Guoan youth player Guo Jiaxuan died at 18 years of age at Beijing's Tiantan Hospital. On 6 February, He suffered a severe training injury in Spain as part of Beijing Football Association's training squad in preparation of the 2025 National Games of China that led to him being pronounced brain dead locally. He was transferred back to Beijing for medical care, but never regained consciousness.

Guoan resumed league competition on 29 March against Chengdu Rongcheng in what was also the home opener of the season. In the 12th minute, Yang Liyu was fouled in the penalty box after dribbling down the left-hand side, and the referee awarded Guoan a penalty after a lengthy video review. Abreu converted the penalty to give Guoan a 1–0 lead. In the second half, Ngadeu stepped on a Chengdu player's foot in an attempt to win back a lost ball, but the foul was deemed too aggressive and he was sent off in the 67th minute. Despite several saves from Han Jiaqi, Guoan was unable to hold the lead and conceded in the 78th minute. The game ended in a 1–1 draw with Guoan slipping to 7th place.

=== April ===
A midweek match on 2 April followed the draw against Chengdu Rongcheng, with Guoan travelling to play Tianjin Jinmen Tiger. In the 5th minute, Spajić was knocked unconscious after colliding with an opposition player in an aerial duel, and was taken off in replacement by home-grown youngster Fan Shuangjie for his first appearance of the season. In the 27th minute, Li Lei received a cross from Dawhan and slotted the ball into the net, giving Guoan a 1–0 advantage. Later on in the first half, Guoan goalkeeper Han Jiaqi made two crucial saves to keep Guoan ahead. In the 70th minute and the 78th minute, Tianjin's Xie Weijun and Xadas each assisted Alberto Quiles for two goals in quick succession, and the game was turned on its head as Guoan handed Tianjin a 2–1 lead. In the first minute of second-half stoppage time, Yang Liyu's cross looped into Tianjin's penalty area, and Tianjin centre-back Yang Fan headed the ball into his own net, with the own goal leveling the game at 2–2, which finished as the full-time score, as Guoan fell to eighth place. Spajić has since regained consciousness.

Guoan returned home to play Zhejiang on 6 April. In the 21st minute, Cao Yongjing's shot from outside the box was blocked by Zhejiang defenders, but the ball fell to Abreu, who finished from a tight angle to give Guoan a 1–0 lead. Abreu's goal was Guoan's 900th goal at home. In the 56th minute, Abreu sent in a cross from the right wing, and Zhejiang defender Leung Nok Hang sent the ball into his own net in an attempt to intercept the cross, doubling Guoan's lead to 2–0. Han Jiaqi and Zhejiang's goalkeepers eachmade repeated saves, and the game ended with a 2–0 Guoan win. Guoan extended its unbeaten streak to five games, and the win helped the team move up to fifth place in the standings, two points behind the league leaders.

With the game against Qingdao West Coast postponed due to high winds, Guoan's next game came on 15 April at Wuhan Three Towns, against which Guoan suffered a late collapse. Guoan started the game well as Guga assisted Abreu for a goal in the 3rd minute. Zhang Yuning scored his first goal in almost a year in the 22nd minute thanks to an Abreu through ball. In the 31st minute, Wuhan's Palacios scored from outside the box and halved the deficit. In the 34th minute, Guga's corner found Sai Erjini'ao, who headed it into the net for his first Guoan goal and extending the lead to 3–1. Guoan's lead grew to 4–1 in the 69th minute, with Yang Liyu tapping in Abreu's attempt to lob the goalkeeper. However, Guoan could not maintain defensive solidity, giving away three goals from the 87th minute onward including a penalty, and the game ended in a 4–4 draw. Han Jiaqi and Dawhan were injured in the game and had to be substituted. After the game, the club confirmed that Han suffered a serious ACL injury as well as a meniscus tear in his left knee. He was expected to be unavailable for the rest of the season.

Beijing Guoan's injury-riddled line-up v Shandong Taishan, 19 April 2025

Guoan returned home to play Shandong Taishan on 19 April. The team was hobbled by injury ahead of the game as Han Jiaqi, Ngadeu, Spajić, and Dawhan all had suffered recent injuries and were unavailable for the match. Youngster Fan Shuangjie started at defensive midfield. Only 4 minutes into the game, Hou Sen's mistake allowed Shandong's Zeca to score the opening goal, putting Guoan 0–1 behind. Guoan responded quickly with Abreu scoring a header from a Zhang Yuning cross in the 15th minute to level the game at 1–1. In the 25th and 37th minute respectively, the referee deemed Shandong players Wu Xinghan and Zeca to have committed serious fouls, and sent off both players, giving Guoan a two-man advantage before halftime. Guga capitalised on the advantage in the 4th minute of the first half's added time, scoring his first goal of the season and sending Guoan 2–1 up. In the 47th minute, Sai Erjini'ao scored Guoan's third, and Abreu doubled his tally in the 52nd minute to give Guoan a 4–1 lead. Cao Yongjing was sent off in the 59th minute for fouling the opposition player as the last man, leaving Guoan with 10 men against Shandong's nine. Zhang Yuning scored from the top of the box in the 76th minute, and Zhang Xizhe scored in the 91st to seal the game for Guoan at 6–1. Zhang Xizhe's goal meant that he scored for Guoan for 16 consecutive seasons, and new signing Li Ruiyue debuted in the 81st minute. Abreu was later awarded player of the matchday by CSL.

On 25 April, Guoan hosted Henan at home. In the 28th minute, Fang Hao dribbled into space and launched a shot into the net to give Guoan a one-goal lead. Zhang Xizhe was given a red card in the 88th minute after a VAR review for his late tackle on a Henan player, increasing Guoan's seasonal red card tally to 5 in just 8 games. Guoan's 1–0 win extended the team's streak without defeat to 8 games.

Guoan in action in April 2025
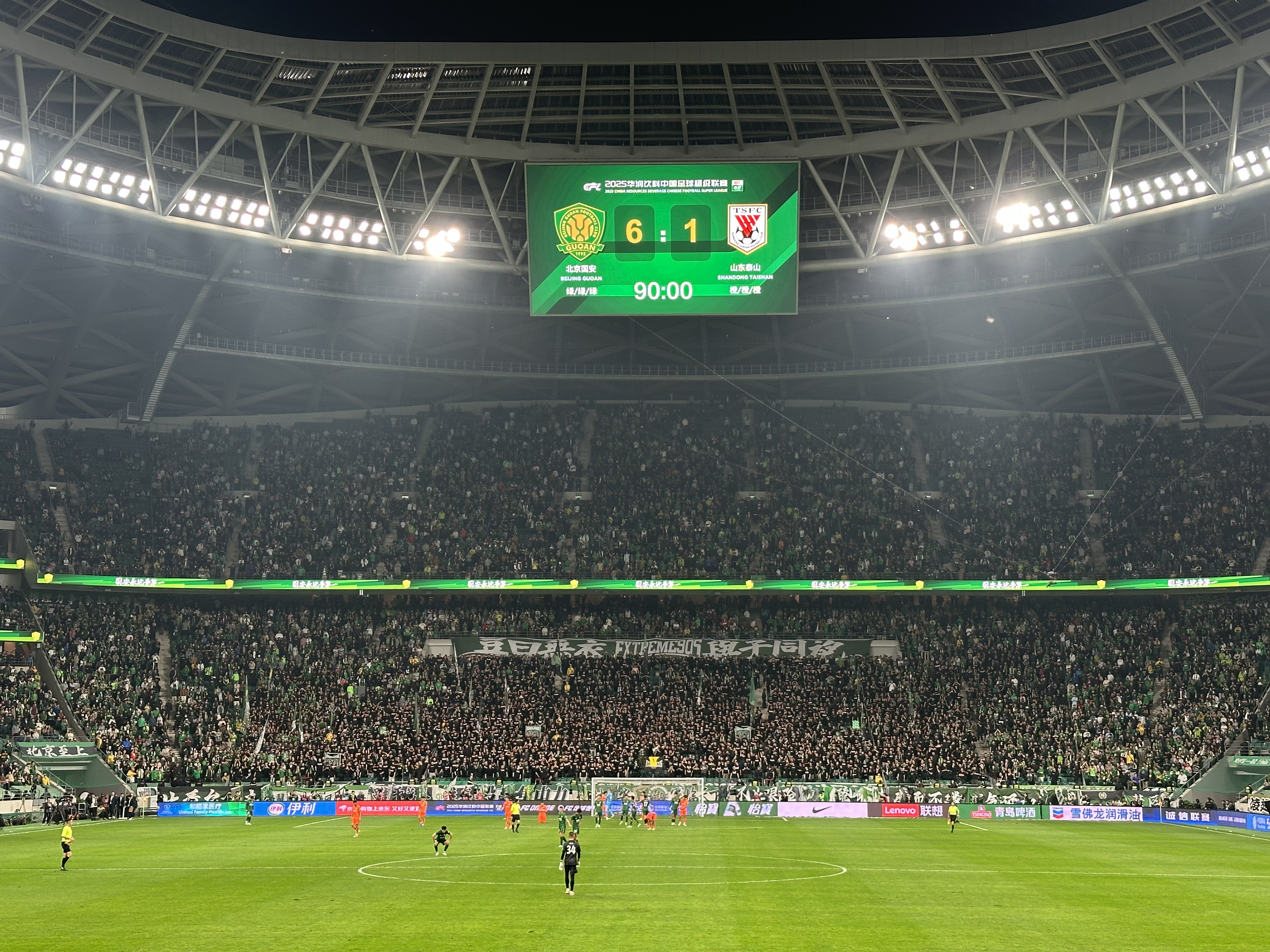
At the end of Guoan's 6–1 home victory against Shandong Taishan on 19 April

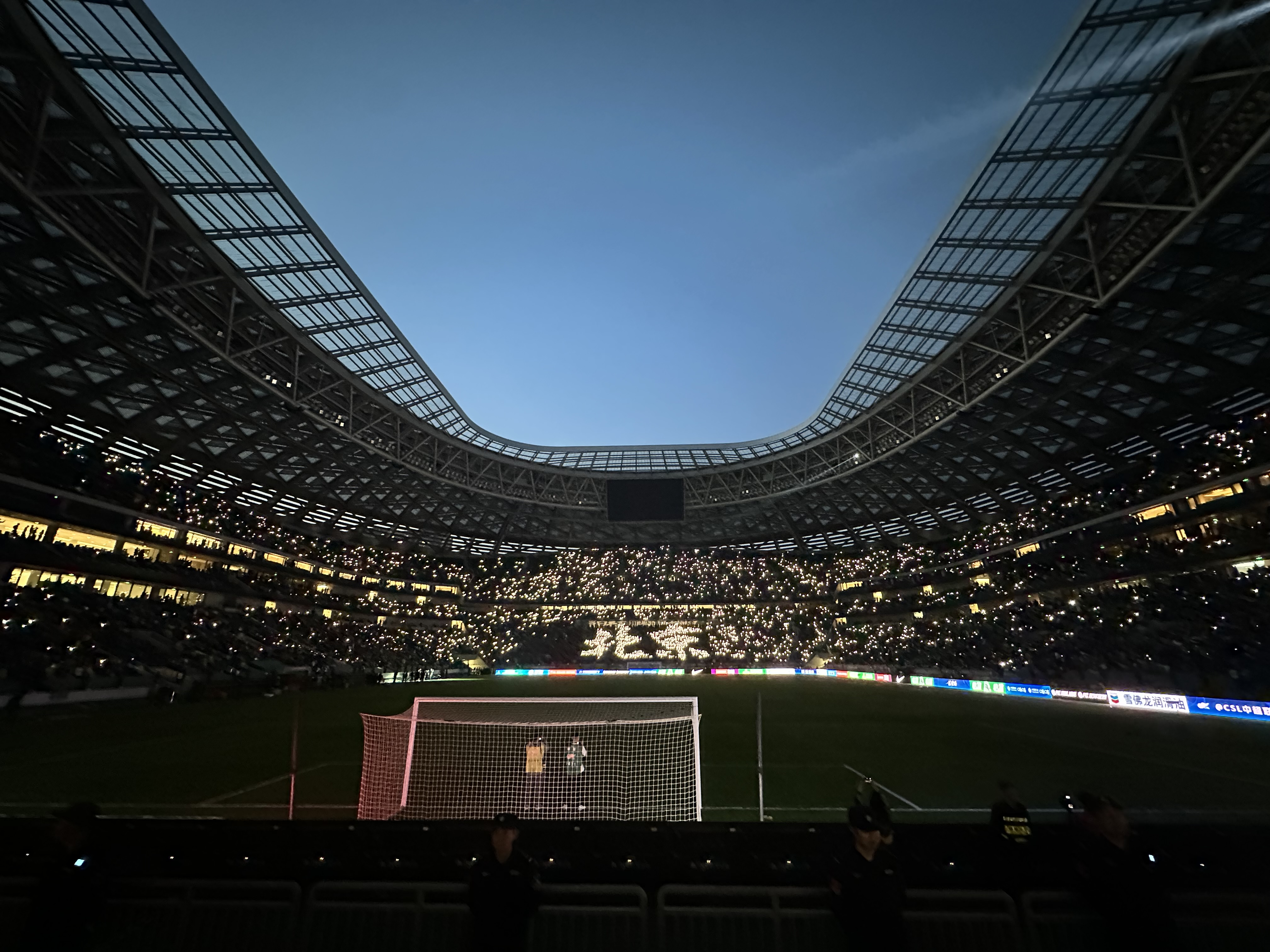
Light show in Workers' Stadium ahead of the match against Henan on 25 April

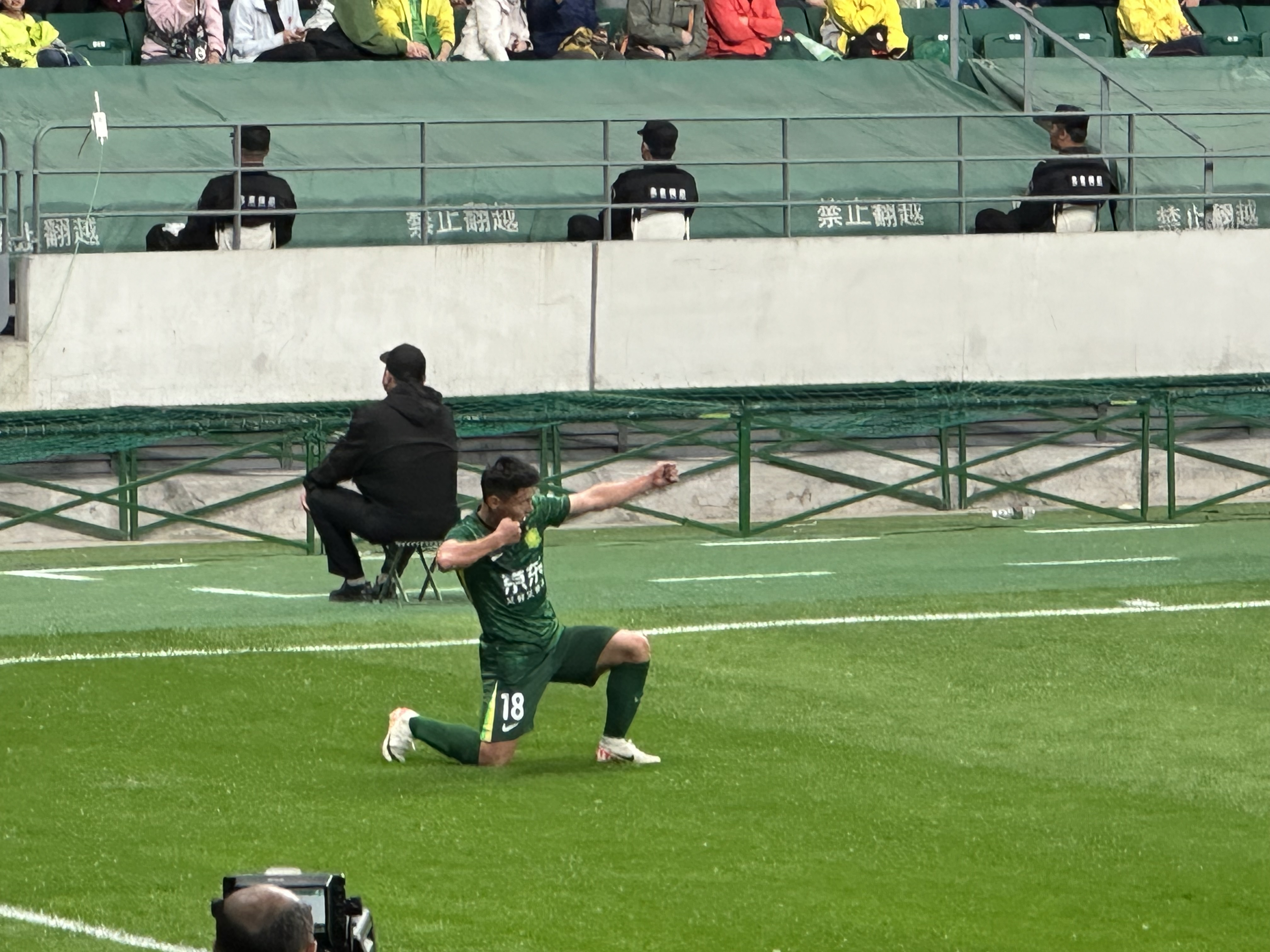
Fang Hao celebrating his goal against Henan on 25 April that proved to be the difference between the two teams

=== May ===
Guoan traveled to play defending league champions Shanghai Port on 1 May. In the 20th minute, Guoan's on-field captain Wang Gang was withdrawn for Wu Shaocong due to an injury sustained in a defensive action. In the 40th minute, Shanghai Port took the lead after Liu Ruofan scored a header from a corner. Guoan managed to equalize only 2 minutes later, with Abreu slotting home a deflected Lin Liangming shot. In the 55th minute, Lin Liangming cut in from the left wing and curled the ball into Shanghai Port's far corner, giving Guoan a 1–2 lead. Chances occurred for both teams, but neither team was able to score again. With the 1–2 away victory, Guoan replaced Shanghai Port in 3rd place on the league table and remained undefeated for the season.

The club announced that it had extended Ngadeu's contract to the end of the 2025 season on 4 May, ensuring he could continue to be a part of the team's defense.

On 5 May, Guoan continued its away journey against Dalian Yingbo, which remained undefeated at home at the time, at the newly constructed Suoyuwan Football Stadium. Setién rotated slightly, nominating Zhang Yuan and Wang Ziming for their respective first starts of the season. In the 18th minute, Wang Ziming rewarded Setién's choice by heading in a Guga cross to give Guoan a 1–0 lead. In the 22nd minute, Abreu headed in a deflected Wang Gang cross, sending Guoan up 2–0. In the 90th minute, Zhang Yuning was fouled by Dalian players in the box that resulted in a penalty for Guoan. However, his attempt was saved. Guoan ended the game with a 2–0 victory, extending its win streak to 4 games. The game also extended Guoan's undefeated streak to 19 games across this and the 2024 season, the longest such streak in the team's history.

Guoan defended its home ground on 10 May against Shenzhen Peng City. In the 28th minute, a Sai Erjini'ao cross from the right flew across the entire Shenzhen defense and found Lin Liangming, who headed it in for a 1–0 lead. Ahead of the half, Guga's backheeled assist set up Sai Erjini'ao, who struck the bottom left corner from outside the box to put Guoan 2–0 up. In the 48th minute, Shenzhen's Dugalić pulled one back after his header from a corner broke through Hou Sen's defense. In the 71st minute, Guga scored off a corner rebound, sealing the game for Guoan at 3–1. The team remains undefeated this season and extended its winning streak to 5 games.

On 17 May, Guoan traveled to play Qingdao Hainiu. The clubs drew 0–0 at the half. In the 52nd minute, Lin Liangming opened the scoring for Guoan by heading in a rebound of a Ngadeu header that hit the post. However, Guoan were unable to maintain its advantage, falling to a 94th minute Hainiu header from Liu Jinshuai. The game ended in a 1–1 draw. While Guoan maintained its third place in the league table, its gap to the leader was extended to 6 points, though Guoan has a game in hand.

Guoan began this season's Chinese FA Cup campaign on 21 May, traveling to play China League One side Shijiazhuang Gongfu. Guoan's first three-goal came from set pieces. In the 16th minute, Zhang Yuan's corner found the head of advancing Dawhan. In the 30th minute, Wang Ziming latched onto Nebijan's corner and scored from the edge of the penalty area. In the 57th minute, Zhang Xizhe scored in his 400th match in all competitions for the club from a direct free kick, which was given as an opposition player was sent off for a bad foul. In the 68th minute, Zhang Yuan scored as Fang Hao set him up from the left side. 8 minutes later, Li Lei's cross from the left allowed Wang Ziming to score his second. The game ended as a 5–0 Guoan victory and Guoan advanced to the fourth round of Chinese FA Cup.

Guoan in action in May 2025
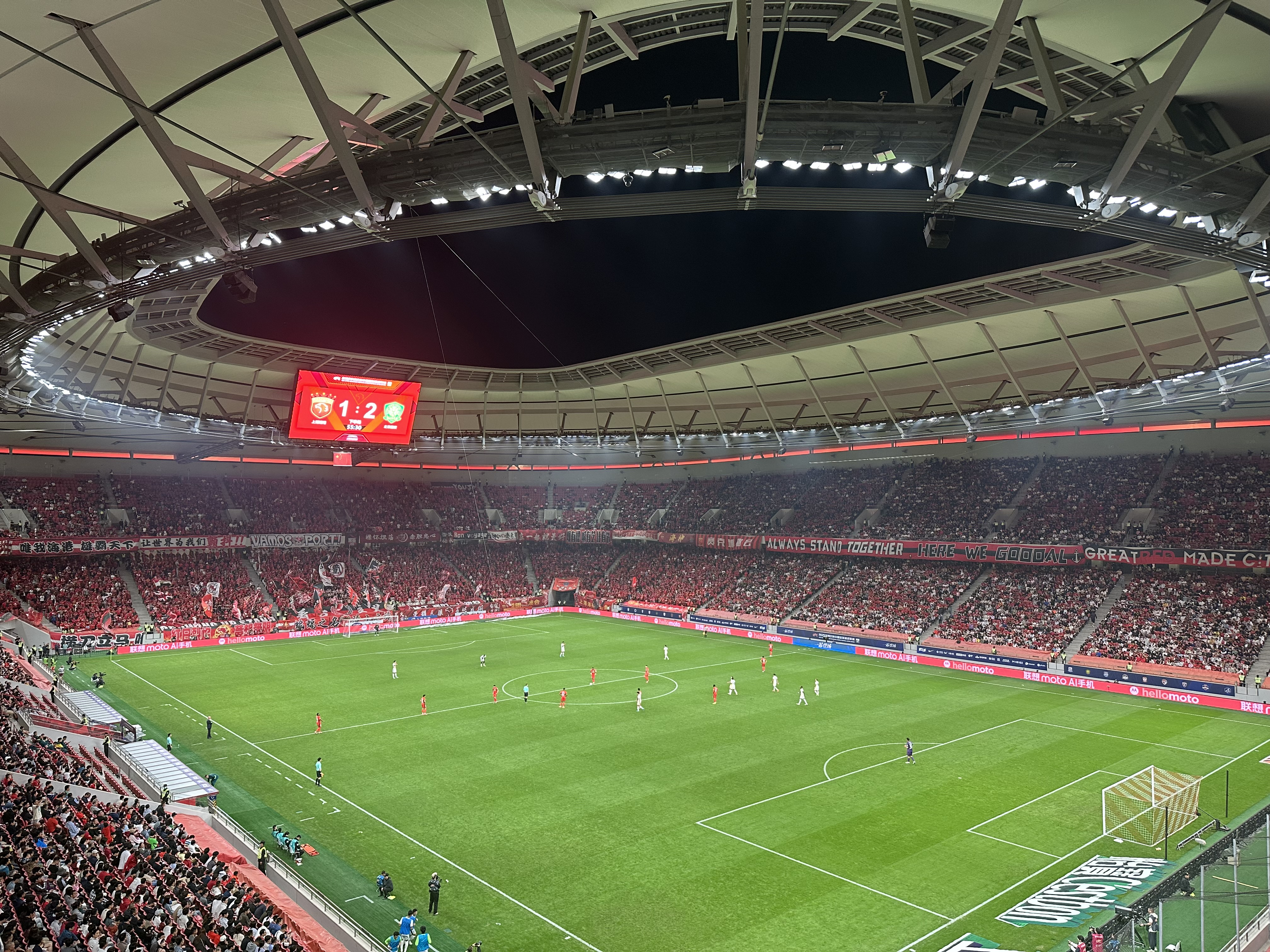
Restart at the Pudong Football Stadium after Guoan scored its second goal against Shanghai Port on 1 May

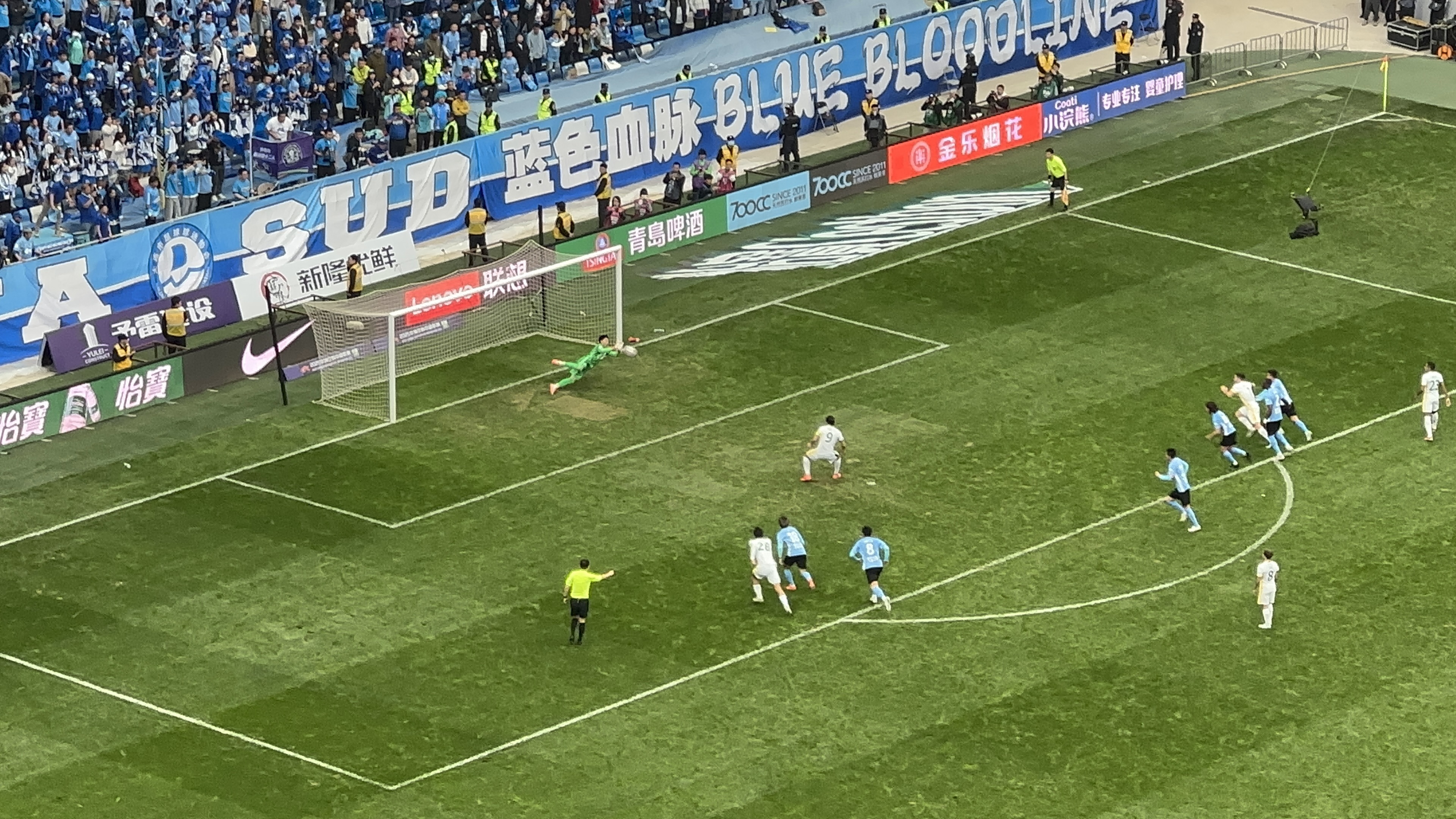
Zhang Yuning's penalty attempt was saved by Sui Weijie in the match against Dalian Yingbo on 5 May

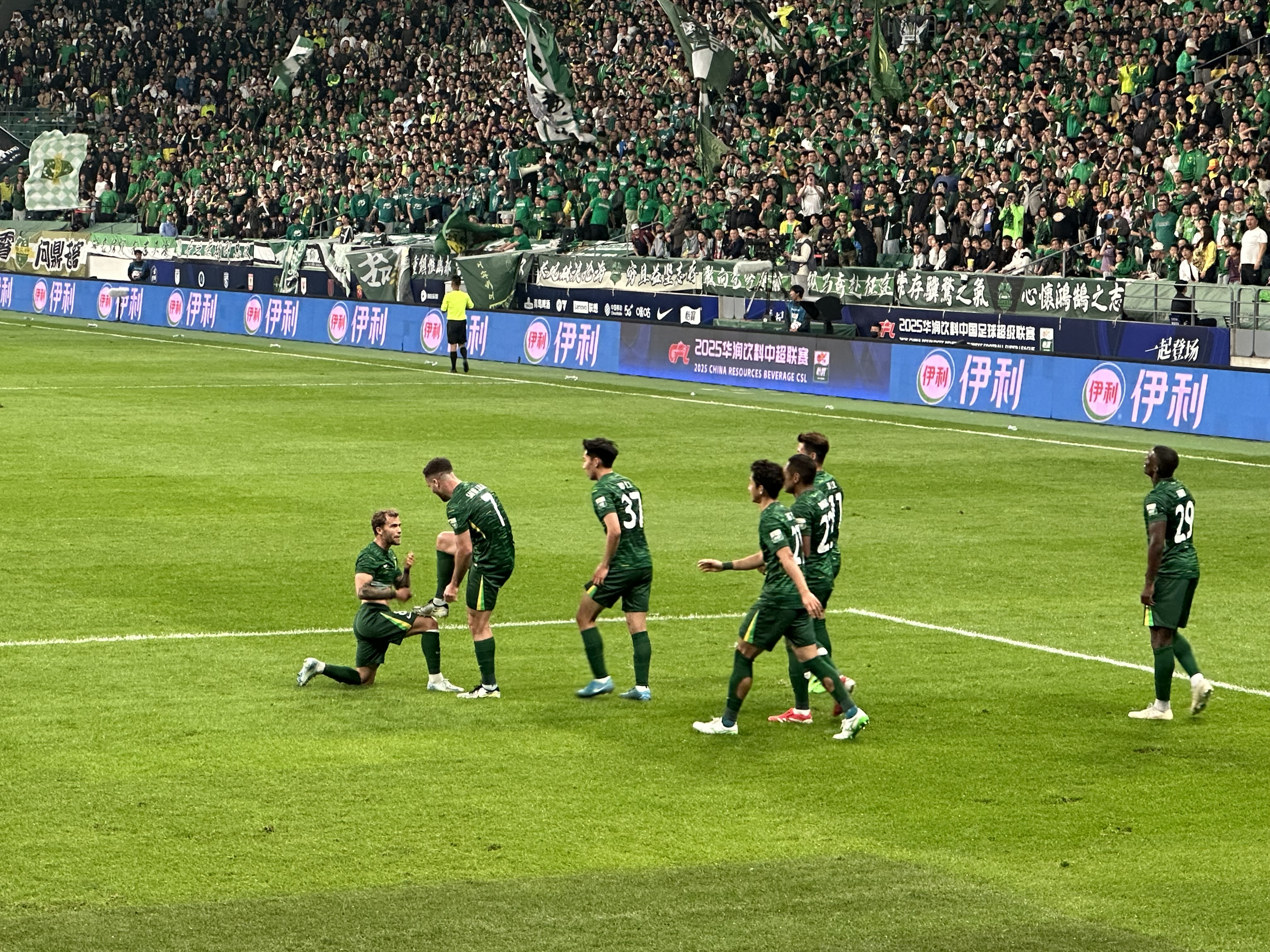
Guga and teammates celebrating the team’s second goal against Shenzhen Peng City on 10 May

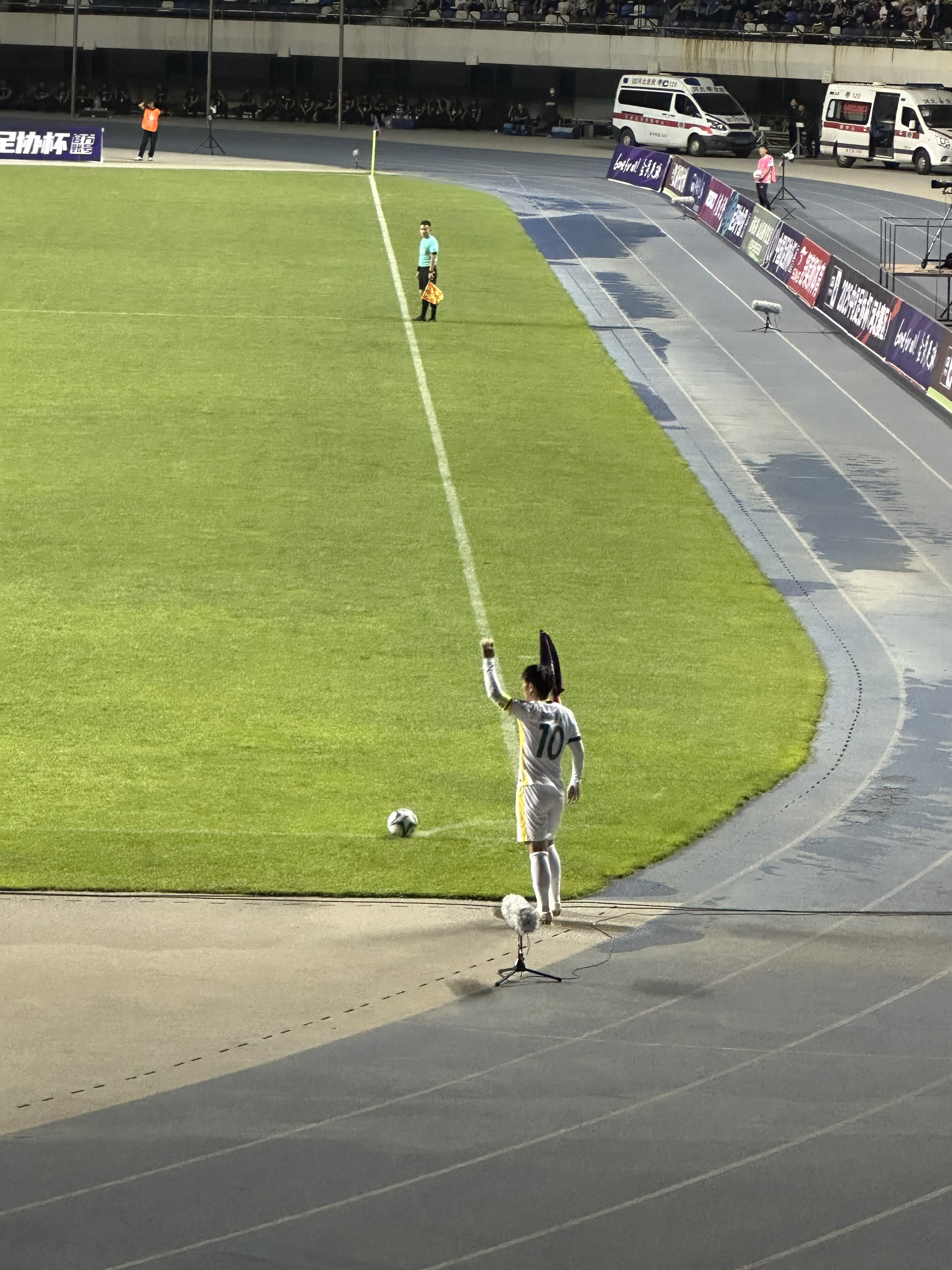
Captain Zhang Xizhe readies a corner in his 400th Guoan appearance on 21 May

=== June ===
After the June international break, Guoan resumed its league campaign at home on 14 June against Changchun Yatai, which was being coached by the previous Guoan trainer Ricardo Soares. Ahead of the game, fans unveiled a massive tifo celebrating captain Zhang Xizhe's achieving 400 outings across all competitions for the club – he was only the third players to have done so for Guoan, following Xu Yunlong and Yang Zhi. Zhang, who was named in the starting eleven for the first time this season, scored in the 17th minute after Changchun's keeper mistakenly kicked the ball directly to Zhang. Cao Yongjing doubled Guoan's lead in the 25th minute thanks to an Abreu assist. In the 88th minute, Changchun's He Yiran sent a throughball to Tan Long, who pulled one back for Changchun. Guoan ended the game with a 2–1 victory, putting the club only 3 points behind league leader Shanghai Shenhua with a game in hand. Li Lei, who came on as a substitute in the 83rd minute, reached 200 appearance with the club across all competitions.

On 17 June, Guoan played Qingdao West Coast at home after the inclement weather during matchday 6 forced the game to be rescheduled. Ahead of kick-off, Guoan fans hosted a light show commemorating Li Lei reaching 200 appearances for the club. In the 23rd minute. Dawhan headed a corner towards Ngadeu, who redirected it towards West Coast's goal. The ball hit the goalpost and rebounded into the net after hitting West Coast's goalkeeper Li Hao, allowing Guoan to establish a 1–0 lead. Neither team made inroad in the second half, and the game remained 1–0 until the end. The win extended Guoan's undefeated run to 14 games and elevated Guoan to 1st in the league standings after 14 matchdays.

Guoan traveled to face off against Dalian Yingbo on 21 June in the fourth round of the Chinese FA Cup. Setién opted to rotate the team, starting Li Lei, Zhang Xizhe, and a number of substitutes. The first half saw Guoan overpowered, and in the 43rd minute Hou Sen brought down onrushing Cephas Malele for a penalty, which Malele converted and put Guoan 0–1 behind. Guoan brought on starters in the second half. In the 62nd minute, Dawhan put the ball into the net from a Li Lei cross, but VAR review ruled that Wang Gang used his hand to control the ball in an instance during the early build-up, and the goal was ruled out. In the 90th minute, Sai Erjini'ao assisted Zhang Yuning to score in a chaotic situation to bring Guoan level at 1–1. Neither team managed to score in extra time. In penalties, Guoan's Abreu and Guga missed the first and third penalty while Dalian's Malele and Isnik Alimi missed their first and fifth penalty. Both teams scored in the next two rounds. In the 8th round of the shoot-out, Nebijan scored first for Guoan while Hou Sen saved the shot from Liu Yi, giving Guoan a 6–5 victory in penalties and sending Guoan through to the quarter-finals of the competition.

Guoan continued its away trip against Meizhou Hakka on 25 June. In the 20th minute, a Guga cross found the foot of Abreu, who tapped it in for a 1–0 Guoan lead. In the 45th minute, Spajić notched a Sai Erjini'ao cross towards Abreu, who finished for his second of the game and put Guoan 2–0 up at halftime. In the 54th minute, Cao Yongjing deftly slid the ball through Meizhou's defense for a rushing Fang Hao, who finished for Guoan's third. Abreu completed his hat-trick in the 69th minute when he tucked in Zhang Yuan's through ball into the far corner of Meizhou's goal. With the 4–0 win, Guoan remain undefeated in the front half of the league campaign and notched first place at the halfway mark of the league season.

Guoan's last game in June came on 30 June at home against Yunnan Yukun. In the 29th minute, Guoan's defensive errors allowed Ye Chugui to put one past Hou Sen, sending Guoan a goal down. Three minute later, Abreu was brought down in the opposition penalty area and the referee awarded a penalty, but VAR review canceled the spot kick. In the 55th minute, Sai Erjini'ao's cross found Zhang Yuning, who headed it goalwards for Abreu to finish, leveling the game at 1–1. In the 81st minute, Zhang Yuning was brought down by Yunnan's Duan Dezhi, a former Guoan academy player, in the penalty box. Zhang Xizhe calmly converted from the spot, giving Guoan a 2–1 lead that would be held to the end. Guoan remained undefeated for the season and retained top of the league on goal difference after 16 matchdays.

Guoan in action in June 2025
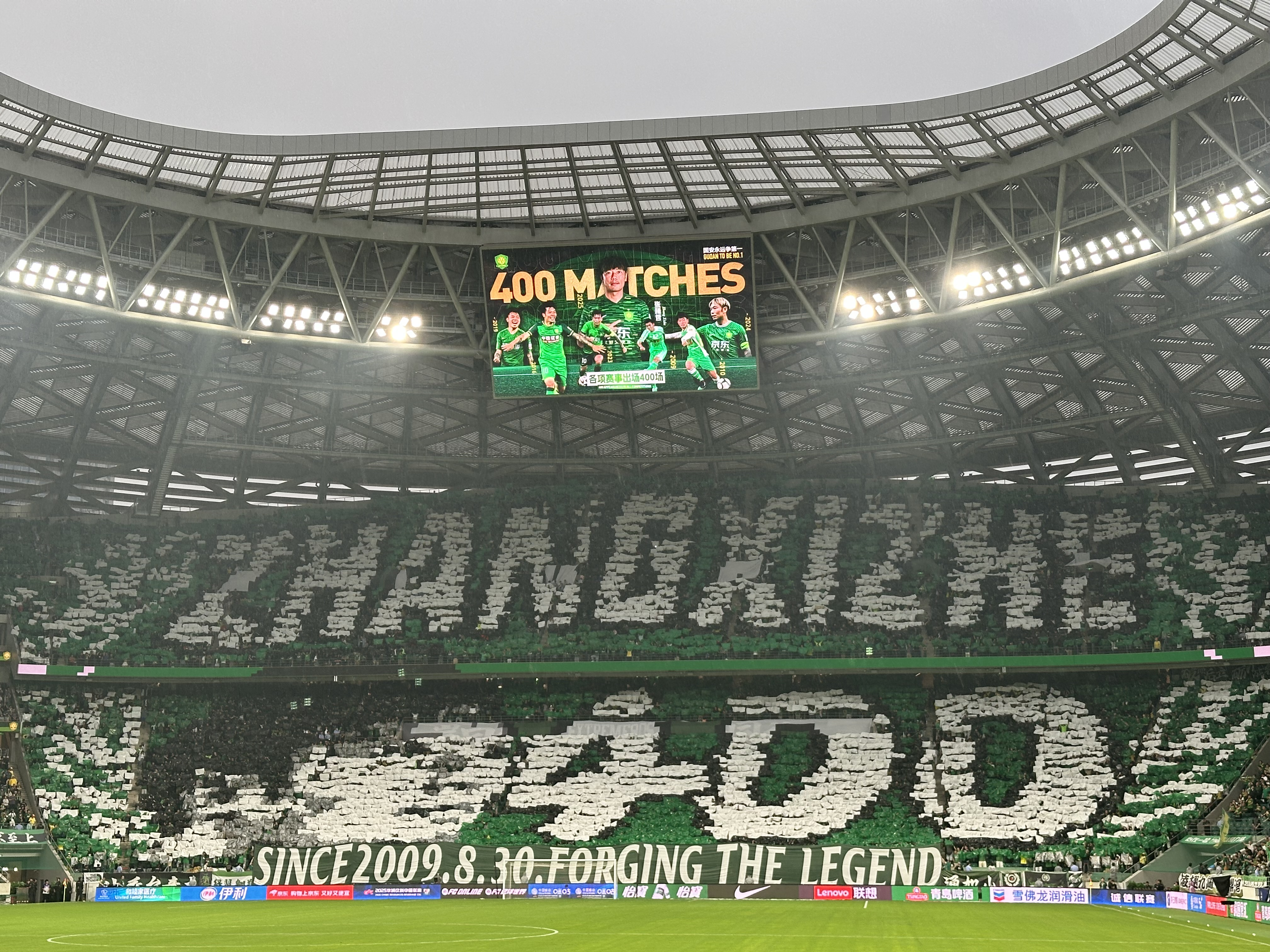
Tifo celebrating Zhang Xizhe's 400th appearance for the club ahead of the match against Changchun Yatai on 14 June

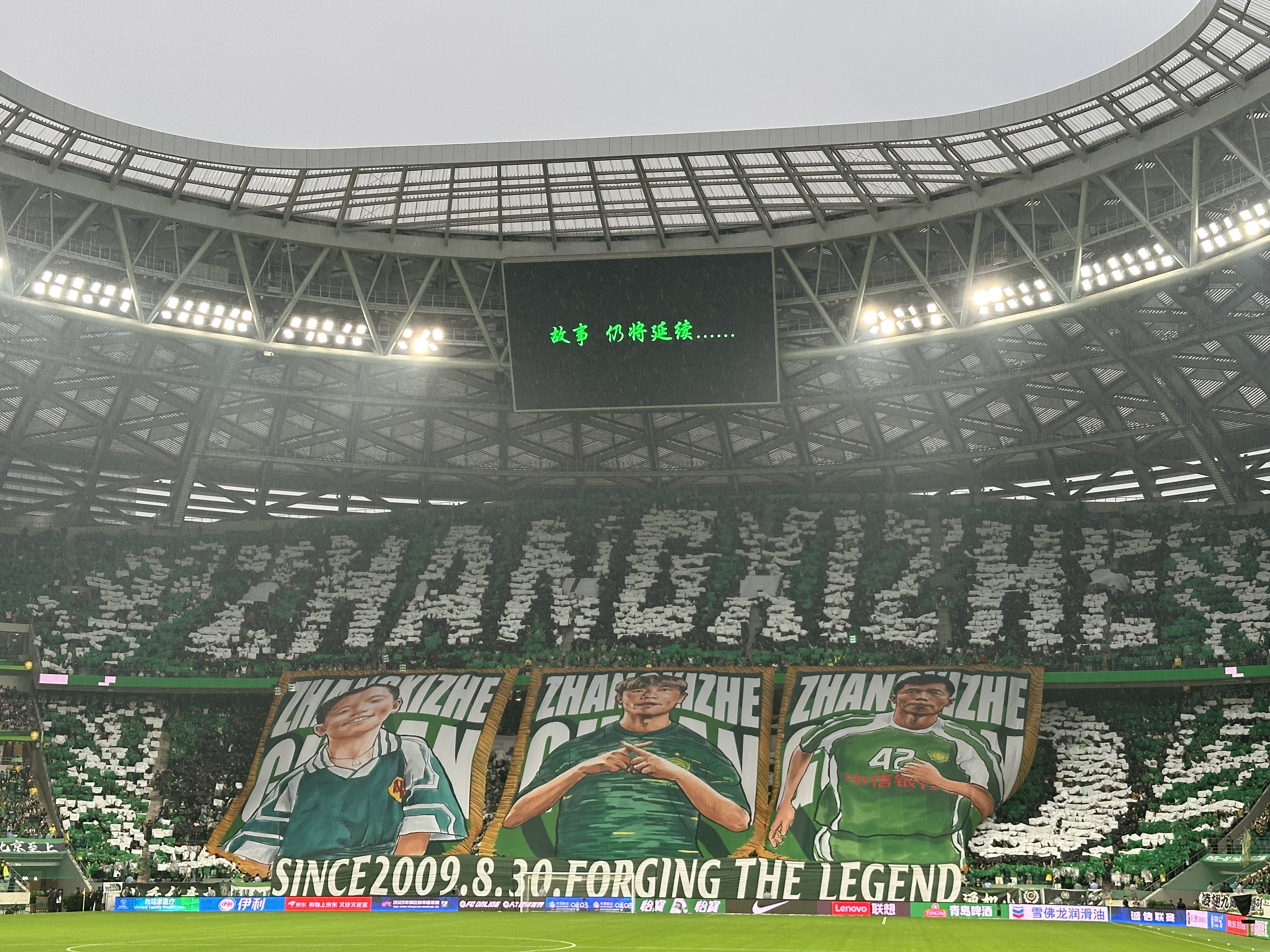
Tifo celebrating Zhang Xizhe's 400th appearance for the club on 14 June with extended fan illustrations

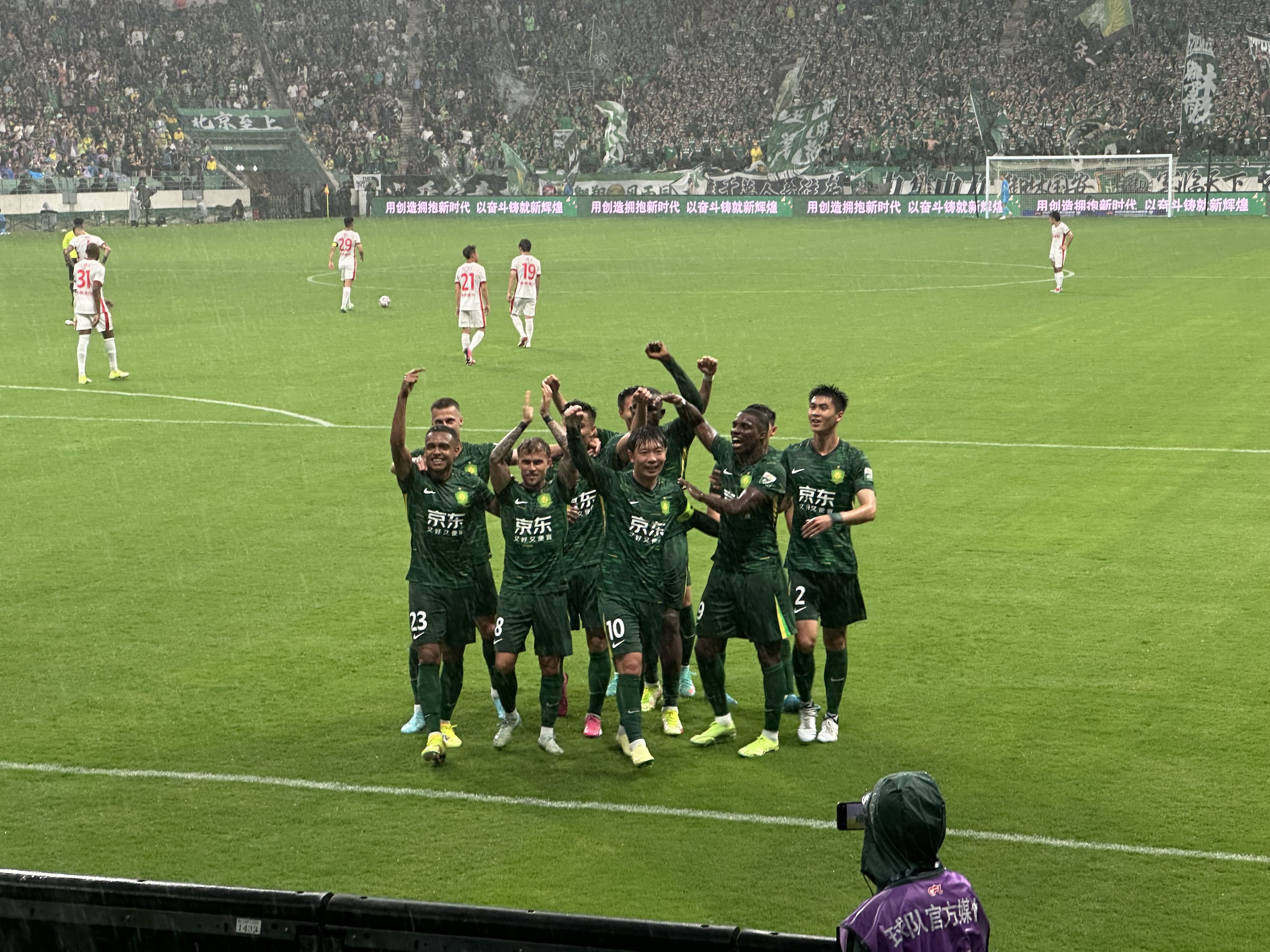
Captain Zhang Xizhe and teammates celebrating his goal against Changchun Yatai on 14 June

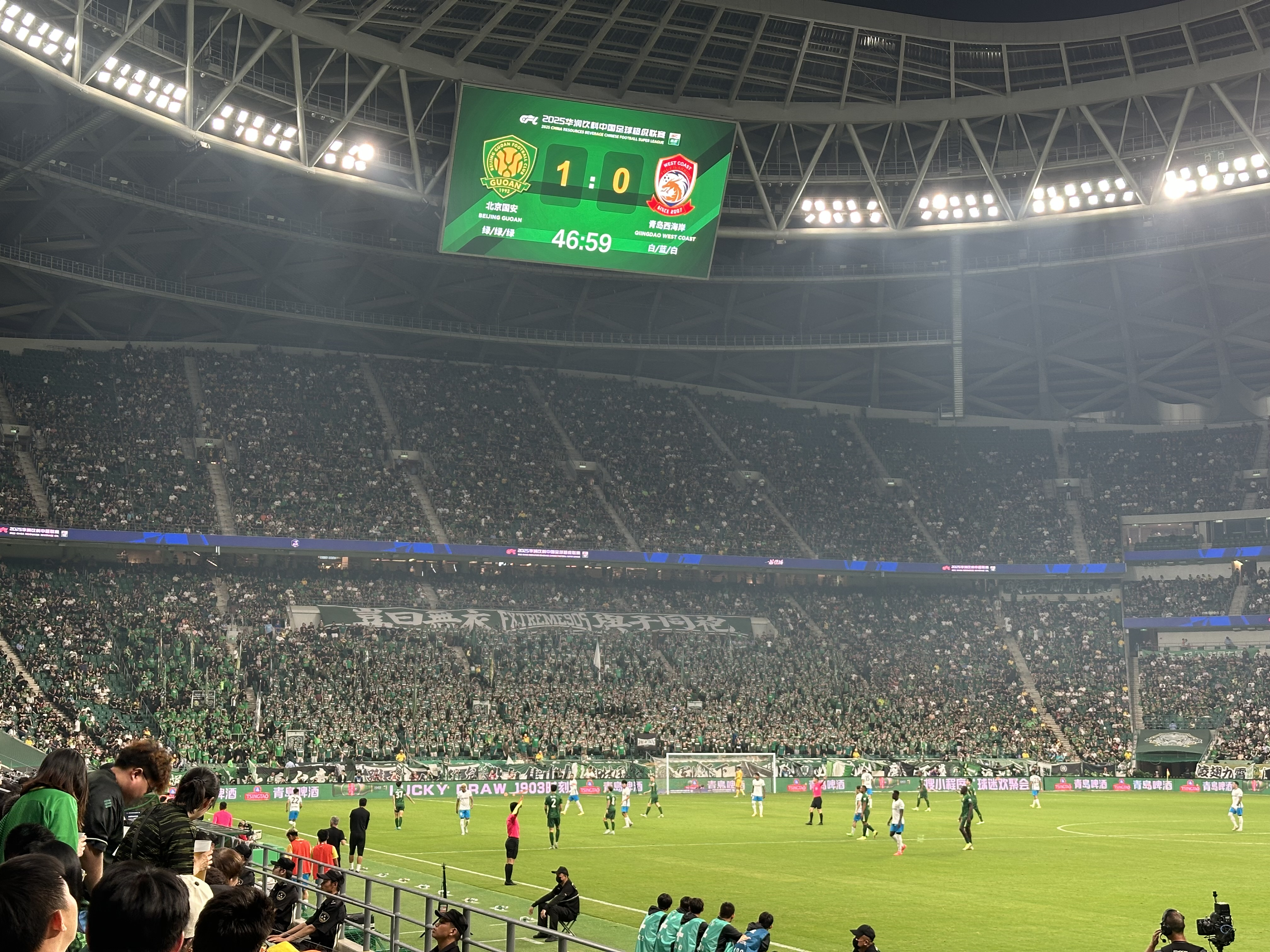
Guoan players during the match against Qingdao West Coast on 17 June

=== July ===
On 18 July, Guoan announced the permanent signing of Nanjing City goalkeeper Zhang Jianzhi, who was given the number 39 shirt.

On 19 July, Guoan faced off against rivals Shanghai Shenhua in the league at home. Going into the match, Guoan previously held a record of twelve consecutive home wins over Shenhua, and Guoan and Shenhua were respectively first and second place in the league table. Before the game, Guoan supporters held up a tifo of Nezha, Deshengmen, and text reading "Beijing Cheng". In the 7th minute of the match, Shenhua player Gao Tianyi swung in a cross for Shenhua debutant Luis Asué to finish home with a header, putting Shenhua 1–0 up early in the game. In the 20th minute, João Carlos Teixeira received a pass from Asué in space, however, his effort was wide of the post. In the 21st minute, Shenhua's Wilson Manafá provided a long ball for Wu Xi, who made his way past the defending Spajić and slotted the ball in the bottom corner, as Shenhua doubled their lead and made it 2–0 away from home. In the 26nd minute, Guga scored from a direct free-kick, halving the deficit, making the scoreline 1–2. After the break in the 82nd minute, substitute Yu Hanchao scored a tap-in, however, the goal was ruled out by VAR. In the seventh minute of second-half stoppage time, Yu Hanchao broke through the Guoan defence and finished it off in the bottom corner, putting the game to wraps at 3–1. With this win, Shenhua overtook Guoan in the league table, and while Guoan find themselves in second place, Shenhua have taken the top position of the table.

Three days later on 22 July, Guoan traveled to play Qingdao West Coast in the Chinese FA Cup quarter-finals. Guoan rotated slightly, bringing on Wang Ziming, Chi Zhongguo, Zhang Xizhe, and Li Lei into the starting lineup. The first half saw Zhang Yuning exit after an injury, but the scoreline remained 0–0. In the second half, West Coast's He Longhai misplaced his backpass to the keeper in the 51st minute, allowing Wang Ziming to intercept and score to give Guoan a 1–0 lead. West Coast tied quickly, though, in the 62nd minute through Abdul-Aziz Yakubu. The game entered extra-time as the teams drew 1–1 after regulation. In the 116th minute, Cao Yongjing latched onto an Ngadeu pass, dribbled past defenders, and thumped the ball into West Coast's goal to give Guoan a 2–1 lead. However, Davidson's header which caused a deflection onto Nebijan's head levelled the game for West Coast in the 119th minute through a set piece, sending the game to penalties. In penalties, West Coast's Yakubu and Matheus Índio missed the first two spot kicks, allowing Guoan to ultimately win the shootout 4–2. With the victory, Guoan was through to the competition's semi-finals and would face Yunnan Yukun in August.

Guoan's last game in July came away against Chengdu Rongcheng. Despite winning only 1 in the last 5 games, Chengdu quickly seemed the stronger team, creating shots and testing Hou Sen. In the 33rd minute, De Erjiaduo scored inside the penalty box through a set piece situation to give Chengdu the 1–0 lead. Setién made a number of personnel changes in the second to little avail, and De Erjiaduo assisted center-back Timo Letschert for Chengdu's second. The game ended in a 0–2 Guoan defeat and marked the first game in the season in which Guoan failed to score, sending the team down to 3rd place. This game represented a noticeable dip in Guoan's form after the summer break, winning none of the 3 matches played and suffering 2 consecutive defeats in the league.

=== August ===
On 2 August, Guoan announced that defender Uroš Spajić suffered an ACL injury in his right knee in the game against Shanghai Shenhua, potentially sidelining him for the rest of the season.

Guoan hosted rivals Tianjin Jinmen Tiger at the Workers' Stadium on 3 August. In the 20th minute, coordination error from Guoan's backline allowed Tianjin's Alberto Quiles to round Hou Sen and give Tianjin the 1–0 lead. Guoan responded in the 43rd minute with Dawhan heading a Sai Erjini'ao corner into the far side of the net, drawing the game at 1–1 before the break. In the 52nd minute, Tianjin's Albion Ademi's shot hit the post, and Quiles reacted to rebound the ball into Guoan's net, sending Guoan down 2–1. Abreu pulled Guoan level again in the 70th minute, heading in a Nebijan cross. The game ended in a 2–2 draw, and Guoan slipped to 4th place in the table, having been on a three-game winless streak.

Guoan traveled to Huanglong Stadium to face off against Zhejiang on 10 August. In the 21st minute, Guoan conceded first as Hou Sen struggled to keep out a header from Lucas. Guoan responded in the 24th minute with Dawhan setting Guga for a long-range goal to tie the game at 1–1. In the third minute of added time for the first half, Zhejiang regained their lead through a counterattack finished off by Alexandru Mitriță. Returning from the half, Zhejiang's Wang Yudong used his speed to send Guoan 1–3 down in just the 46th minute. In the 54th minute in a play similar to Guoan's first goal, Sai Erjini'ao set up Cao Yongjing for a shot from outside the penalty area to reduce Guoan's deficit down to one goal. In the 60th minute, Zhejiang's Cheng Jin was shown a red card after VAR review for reckless foul. 5 minutes later, Guoan tied the game via Abreu, who bumped into the goal the rebound from his own header. Guoan edged ahead in the 77th minute with Abreu nodding a Nebijan cross down for Wang Ziming to score. The game ended in a 4–3 Guoan victory, the first in 4 matches, and allowed Guoan to remain only 3 points behind league leaders Shanghai Shenhua.

The 2025–26 AFC Champions League Two group stage draw took place on 15 August. Guoan was drawn into Group E and set to play Tai Po FC, Cong An Hanoi FC, and Macarthur FC, with the first game set to be played on 18 September.

Guoan played Qingdao West Coast away on 16 August on matchday 21. Setién opted for a four-at-the-back formation and started 19-year old Li Ruiyue for the first time in his Guoan career. In the 39th minute, Abreu headed in a Yang Liyu cross from the right to give Guoan the 1–0 lead. Guoan scored two more headers through Lin Liangming and Abreu in the 80th and 85th minute, both assisted by Zhang Xizhe. In the 11th minute of added time, West Coast's Davidson was fouled in the penalty box by He Yupeng, and Davidson converted the penalty to pull one back for Qingdao West Coast. The game ended with a 3–1 away victory for Guoan, allowing Guoan to leapfrog Chengdu into third place in the league, two points behind league leaders Shanghai Port.

On 20 August, Guoan hosted Yunnan Yukun at home in a Chinese FA Cup semi-final tie. In the 26th minute, Abreu scored the opener for Guoan. Five minutes later, Yunnan Yukun's Andrei Burcă was sent off with a direct red card. Taking advantage of ten-men Yunnan Yukun, Guoan scored two more goals with Wang Gang, with his first of the season, and Guga, before half-time. In the second half, Lin Liangming added a fourth to Guoan's tally, before Jiang Wenhao returned to the pitch after a long recovery from his ACL injury in January 2025. With his first involvement in the game, Jiang scored an outside-the-box wonder-strike in the 70th minute. Zhang Xizhe and Zhang Yuning topped off the scoreline to 7–0 as Guoan cruise to the 2025 Chinese FA Cup final after a seven-year absence.

On 25 August, Wuhan Three Towns visited Beijing Guoan at the Workers' Stadium. In the 29th minute, Abreu was tripped in the penalty box, and the foul was given as a penalty. Abreu himself fired Guoan into the lead in the 32nd minute. Before half-time, Sai Erjini'ao received a cross from Cao Yongjing, and doubled Guoan's lead in the sixth minute of added time. In the 53rd minute, Guga put a cross in from a free-kick, and Lin Liangming headed home to make the score 3–0. In the 61st minute, Lin Liangming dashed on the left flank to pull back a low cross, which Zhang Yuning finished off. With this 4–0 home victory, Guoan jump to second place, only one point behind league leaders Shanghai Shenhua.

Guoan traveled to play Shandong Taishan on the last day of the month in a game reported later in the media as a disaster for Guoan. Shandong's Valeri Qazaishvili capitalized on an earlier mistake from Chi Zhongguo, scoring the opener in the 15th minute. He added his second in the 22nd minute, chipping the ball past Hou Sen. Qazaishvili completed his hattrick in the 43rd minute originating from another Chi Zhongguo mistake, and Guilherme Madruga made it 4–0 for Shandong right before the half. Guoan failed to respond, allowing Qazaishvili and Madruga each to score once again. The 6–0 defeat was Guoan's worst league defeat in history. After the game, Guoan slipped to 4th in the league standings, 2 points behind leaders Chengdu Rongcheng.

=== September ===
Guoan's away journey continued on 12 September against Henan. The team apologized ahead of the match for their poor performance in the previous outing, but was unable to put a dent in the team's sliding form. In the 40th minute, Henan took the lead first via Zhong Yihao. In the 84th minute, Bai Yang committed a foul in Guoan's penalty area, and Felippe Cardoso converted the resulting spot kick for a 2–0 Henan lead. Guoan was unable to score, concluding the game with a 0–2 away defeat. While the team maintained fourth place in the standings, it sat five points behind league leaders at the end of matchday 24.

18 September saw Guoan return to continental competition after 4 years, hosting V.League 1 club Cong An Hanoi FC in the club's first match of 2025–26 AFC Champions League Two group stage at the Workers' Stadium. Guoan rotated significantly, debuting Nureli Abbas at goal. Cong An's Vitão opened the scoring in the 15th minute as Nureli failed to deflect the incoming shot away from goal. Chi Zhongguo leveled for Guoan in the 49th minute, striking from distance a ball headed down by Zhang Yuan for his first goal of the season. Zhang Yuan pulled Guoan ahead in the 65th minute, capitalizing on Cong An's goalkeeping mistake from outside the box. In the 73rd minute after a scramble in the Guoan penalty area, Nureli's goalkeeping mistake allowed Cong An's China to level the score. Guoan youngster Wei Jia'ao debuted in the game as well, coming on as a substitute for Zhang Xizhe. The match ended in a 2–2 draw.

Guoan's woeful form continued on 21 September at home against Shanghai Port, a direct competitor for the league title. Guoan conceded in the 7th minute as Leonardo capitalized on a careless moment from Ngadeu. Before halftime, Guoan was able to level the game through a penalty from Abreu. In the 51st minute, however, Leonardo would score again. Leonardo completed his hattrick in the 79th minute, sending Guoan 1–3 behind at home. Zhang Xizhe pulled a goal back for Guoan in the 86th minute, but the team was unable to turn the game around. Guoan ended the game with a 2–3 defeat, its third consecutive loss in the league and its fourth without a win in all competitions. With 5 games to go and a 6-point gap to league leaders, media reports suggested that Guoan was likely out of contention for the league titles this season.

Guoan hosted Dalian Yingbo at home on 26 September, hoping to end the losing streak. In the 29th minute, Zhang Xizhe's delicate movement helped Sai Erjini'ao assist Abreu to give Guoan a 1–0 lead. In the 35th minute, Sai Erjini'ao scored after wading through the opposition's defense, putting Guoan 2–0 ahead. Zhang Xizhe assisted Abreu for Guoan's third in the 53rd minute. Dalian pulled two goals back in the 54th and 56th minute respectively, but Guoan responded with Abreu completing his hat-trick in the 77th minute. With a 4–2 victory, Guoan ended its losing streak but remained 4th in the league table.

=== October ===
Guoan traveled to Sydney to play the A-League's Macarthur FC in the AFC Champions League Two group stage on 2 October. Guoan rotated heavily, and conceded three goals through Chris Ikonomidis, Tomislav Uskok, and Šime Gržan. The 0–3 loss sent Guoan to last in the group with one draw and one loss in two games.

On 5 October, Beijing Guoan announced the resignation of first-team manager Quique Setién. In his stint at Beijing Guoan, he managed 32 matches, earning 17 wins, 9 draws, and suffering 6 losses. In his farewell letter published by the club after his departure, he thanked the players, staff, and the club's management and stated that he left due to personal reasons.

On 7 October, Ramiro Amarelle, Setién's assistant, was announced by the club as the new caretaker manager.

Amarelle's first match came on 18 October in an away league game against Shenzhen Peng City. He opted for a more traditional 4-4-2 lineup, but the team conceded twice in the first half as Shenzhen's Edu García and Wesley scored. Zhang Yuning pulled a goal back for Guoan in the 67th minute, but the team failed to make further inroads. The game ended in a 1–2 defeat for Guoan.

Guoan traveled to Hong Kong on 23 October for their third AFC Champions League Two group match against Tai Po FC. The hosts struck twice early through Michel Renner and James Temelkovski’s penalty respectively to lead 2–0 before Bai Yang and Ngadeu pulled Guoan level by the 53rd minute. Abreu gave Guoan the lead in the 83rd minute, but Renner equalized in stoppage time to seal the match at 3–3. The result left Guoan winless and last in the group after three games.

Three days later on 26 October, Beijing Guoan returned home to face league opponent Qingdao Hainiu. Abreu scored in the 20th minute with his 22nd goal in the league, breaking Branko Jelić's 20-year-old club record of most goals scored in a domestic league season, and Guoan go into half-time one goal up. Ten minutes into the second half, Qingdao Hainiu's Wei Suowei was brought down in the box by Li Lei, and Elvis Sarić converted the penalty to take Qingdao Hainiu level. In the 59th minute, Sai Erjini'ao received a pass from Dawhan to slot the ball into the bottom corner, reinstating the one-goal advantage. With only the one-goal advantage, caretaker manager Ramiro Amarelle substituted Abreu and midfielder starter Guga off in the 85th minute. The minute after the substitution, Sarić equalised for Qingdao Hainiu. It would not end there, as Qingdao Hainiu grab two more goals in stoppage time with Wellington Silva and Sarić, who completed his hat-trick. With the final scoreline of 2–4, Beijing Guoan were out of contention of the league title. In a post-match interview, when asked to draw conclusions about the match, Abreu questioned "how [Beijing Guoan could] win the Chinese FA Cup with the team's current form," and claimed that he felt humiliation. During the match, the Royal Army supporters' group performed three chants aimed at the players and administrative staff to protest the team's recent poor performances, to the tunes of "Dilidili" composed by Pan Zhensheng, "Zapatos rotos" by Los Náufragos, and "U mislima mojim" by Grupa JNA.

"I can't say more, other than to apologise for the supporters in attendance. Every game we're conceding nonstop, and we need to change that and do better. How could we win the Chinese FA Cup with the team's current form? I feel humiliated.

Congratulations to Qingdao for the three points at the Workers' Stadium, the three points they wanted. We lost in the last away game, and conceded many goals, and hoped to bounce back with a win. But we handed the victory over to the opponent. I have nothing to say.

As a captain, I will be a role model to carry the team forward for as long as I could, but we threw away so much compared to last season. Now we have to go step by step, and win back everything we've lost, and wish us luck for the cup."

— Beijing Guoan forward Fábio Abreu on the home loss to Qingdao Hainiu.

=== November ===
On 1 November, Beijing Guoan visited Changchun Yatai in the penultimate fixture of the league season. In the 19th minute, Sai Erjini'ao opened the scoring for Guoan as he scored against his former club. Abreu doubled Guoan's lead, converting a penalty kick in the 13th minute of first-half added time. Going into the second half, Abreu slid the ball wide to substitute Zhang Yuning, who slotted the ball into the far corner in the 77th minute. Five minutes later, Abreu added a fourth goal to Guoan's tally. With this 4–0 away victory, Beijing Guoan secured fourth place in the 2025 Chinese Super League season.

Five days later, Guoan returned home to face Tai Po. After a goalless first-half, He Yupeng dribbled past a Tai Po defender and cross the ball into the path of Zhang Yuning, who capped off the attack with an inside-foot finish at the start of the second-half. With this goal, Zhang Yuning overtook Cédric Bakambu to become the second-highest goalscorer in club history, at 59 goals. In the 85th minute, Sai Erjini'ao received a corner from Yang Liyu and tapped the ball into the far corner. In the sixth minute of added time, Sai Erjini'ao received another assist from Yang Liyu, and secured Guoan's 3–0 win over Tai Po with his second goal of the match.

Guoan concluded its league campaign on 22 November at home, hosting relegation-threatened Meizhou Hakka. Guoan's main man Abreu started the game one goal behind Shandong's Valeri Qazaishvili in the league's golden boot race, and the team did its best to assist Abreu. Bai Yang's cross allowed Abreu to head in the opener just 16 minutes into the game. Abreu doubled his tally just before the end of the first half thanks to an assist from Wang Gang, sending Guoan 2–0 up. Zhang Yuning scored in the 55th minute from a deflected save by Meizhou's keeper Guo Quanbo and increased Guoan's lead to three goals. Guoan conceded in the 63rd minute, but Abreu scored two more in the 71st and 87th minute respectively, allowing Guoan to end with a 5–1 victory. Guoan finished 4th in the league with 57 points. Abreu, scoring 28 goals in 30 league games, claimed the golden boot award for the season. With a substitute appearance in the 70th minute, Zhang Xizhe made his 419th appearance for the club, surpassing Yang Zhi to claim the second spot in the club's all-time appearance list.

On 27 November, Guoan travelled to Hanoi to play Cong An Hanoi. Lin Liangming opened the scoring early on in the match, and Guoan were 1–0 up at the half-time break. In the 76th minute and the 80th minute, CAHN's Stefan Mauk and Nguyễn Đình Bắc scored two goals in quick succession to complete the comeback. The full-time scoreline of 2–1 meant that Guoan were eliminated from the group stage on head-to-head record with one match to spare.

=== December ===

Beijing Guoan's CFA Cup-winning line-up v. Henan, 6 December

Guoan travelled to Suzhou to play in the final of the Chinese FA Cup against Henan on 6 December. Manager Amarelle lined up Guoan in a 4–4–2, opting for veteran defenders Li Lei and Wang Gang on either flank. In the 17th minute, Guoan sought to build out from the backline, switching the ball around until Dawhan found an opening to break forward. His through-ball found Abreu, whose first attempt at the Henan goal was saved. In the rebound chaos, Lin Liangming again found Abreu, who powered the ball into the back of the net to give Guoan a 1–0 lead. Before the half ended, an Abreu's shot hit the arm of Henan defender Lucas Maia inside the penalty area. Abreu converted the 12-yarder to double Guoan's lead. In the 88th minute, Henan defender shoved Zhang Yuning to the ground within the box, and Korean referee Ko Hyung-jin pointed to the spot once more. Abreu's first penalty attempt was saved, but video review confirmed that Henan's goalkeeper Wang Guoming stepped off of his line when making the save. With his second attempt, Abreu completed his hat trick and extended Guoan's lead to 3–0, winning Guoan its fifth Chinese FA Cup trophy.

Guoan's season came to a close at home against Australian side Macarthur FC in the AFC Champions League Two group stage. Macarthur took the lead in the 56th minute through Kristian Popovic, but Sai Erjini'ao quickly equalised for Guoan three minutes later. In the 71st minute, Harrison Sawyer converted a penalty awarded as a result of a Bai Yang foul, securing the ultimate victory for Macarthur. Bai Yang was later sent off via two yellow cards. Guoan concluded its continental campaign as they placed last in the group with 1 win, 2 draws, and 3 losses for a total of 5 points, and was eliminated from the competition. Zhang Yuan announced his departure from the club at the end of the season in the pre-match press conference, with multiple players were reported to exit the club, as their contracts expire at the end of the season.

On 21 December, manager Amarelle announced his departure, thanking the club and the fans.

On 27 December, Guoan announced that General Manager Li Ming will step down. German coach and administrator Matthias Brosamer is appointed as the club's Sporting Director.

On 31 December, Wang Ziming announced his departure from the club after 8 years.

== First team ==
=== First-team coaching staff ===
Position	Name	Nationality	Date of birth (age)	Last club	Ref.
Manager	Ramiro Amarelle	Spain	17 Dec 1977 (age 48)	(Spain) Villarreal (as assistant coach)	
Assistant coaches	Jaime Paz Piñeiro	Spain	13 April 1981 (age 45)	(Spain) Sarriana	
Assistant coaches	Sui Dongliang	China	24 Sep 1977 (age 48)	(China) Beijing Guoan (as caretaker manager)	
Assistant coaches	Tao Wei	China	11 Mar 1978 (age 48)	(China) Beijing Guoan (as player)	
Fitness coach	Zhen Kaixin	China			
Goalkeeping coach	Diego Oria	Spain	11 Feb 1987 (age 39)	(China) Henan (as goalkeeping coach)	

=== First-team squad ===
As of the end of the 2025 season

Note: Flags indicate national team as defined under FIFA eligibility rules; some limited exceptions apply. Players may hold more than one non-FIFA nationality.

No.	Pos.	Nation	Player
1	GK	CHN	Han Jiaqi
2	DF	CHN	Wu Shaocong
3	DF	CHN	He Yupeng
4	DF	CHN	Li Lei
5	DF	CMR	Michael Ngadeu-Ngadjui
6	MF	CHN	Chi Zhongguo
7	MF	CHN	Sai Erjini'ao (Note: Serginho became a naturalised Chinese citizen after joining Beijing Guoan; his official Chinese name was confirmed as Sai Erjini'ao)
8	MF	POR	Guga
9	FW	CHN	Zhang Yuning
10	MF	CHN	Zhang Xizhe (captain)
11	FW	CHN	Lin Liangming
15	DF	SRB	Uroš Spajić
16	DF	CHN	Feng Boxuan
17	FW	CHN	Yang Liyu
18	FW	CHN	Fang Hao
19	DF	CHN	Nebijan Muhmet
20	FW	CHN	Wang Ziming
21	MF	CHN	Zhang Yuan

No.	Pos.	Nation	Player
23	MF	BRA	Dawhan
25	GK	PAR	Zheng Tuluo (Note: Player became a naturalised Chinese citizen before joining Beijing Guoan)
26	DF	CHN	Bai Yang
27	DF	CHN	Wang Gang
28	MF	CHN	Li Ruiyue
29	FW	ANG	Fábio Abreu
30	DF	CHN	Fan Shuangjie
33	GK	CHN	Nureli Abbas
34	GK	CHN	Hou Sen
35	MF	CHN	Jiang Wenhao
37	MF	CHN	Cao Yongjing
39	GK	CHN	Zhang Jianzhi
41	FW	CHN	Wang Zihao
43	FW	CHN	Wang Yuxiang
44	DF	CHN	Li Shanghan
63	MF	CHN	Wei Jia'ao
71	GK	CHN	Lu Tongyun

==== Out on loan ====
As of the end of the 2025 season

Note: Flags indicate national team as defined under FIFA eligibility rules; some limited exceptions apply. Players may hold more than one non-FIFA nationality.

No.	Pos.	Nation	Player
—	MF	CHN	Shi Yucheng (at Shenzhen Juniors until 31 December 2025)
—	DF	CHN	Zhang Yixuan (at Qingdao Red Lions until 31 December 2025)

No.	Pos.	Nation	Player
—	DF	CHN	Hao Yucheng (at Qingdao Red Lions until 31 December 2025)

== Transfers ==
=== In ===
#	Pos.	Player	Age	Moving from	Type	Transfer Window	Ends	Fee	Source
	FW	(China) Yan Yu	22	(China) Heilongjiang Ice City	Loan return	Winter		Free	
	FW	(China) Duan Dezhi	23	(China) Suzhou Dongwu	Loan return	Winter		Free	
	DF	(China) Liang Shaowen	22	(China) Nantong Zhiyun	Loan return	Winter		Free	
	DF	(China) Jiang Wenhao	24	(China) Changchun Yatai	Loan return	Winter		Free	
	DF	(China) Zhang Yixuan	20	(China) Shijiazhuang Gongfu	Loan return	Winter		Free	
	DF	(China) Ruan Qilong	23	(China) Liaoning Tieren	Loan return	Winter		Free	
	MF	(China) Shi Yucheng	23	(China) Shenzhen Juniors	Loan return	Winter		Free	
2	DF	(China) Wu Shaocong	24	(Turkey) İstanbul Başakşehir	Transfer	Winter	2027	€900K	
7	MF	(China) Sai Erjini'ao	29	(China) Changchun Yatai	Transfer	Winter	2028	€526K	
23	MF	(Brazil) Dawhan	28	(Japan) Gamba Osaka	Transfer	Winter	2027	€1.25M	
28	MF	(China) Li Ruiyue	18	(China) Shanghai Jiading Huilong	Transfer	Winter	2029	€66K	
15	DF	(Serbia) Uroš Spajić	32	(Serbia) Red Star Belgrade	Transfer	Winter	2026	Free	
39	GK	(China) Zhang Jianzhi	25	(China) Nanjing City	Transfer	Summer		€23K	

=== Out ===
#	Pos.	Player	Age	Moving to	Type	Transfer Window	Fee	Source
22	MF	(China) Yu Dabao	36	Retired	End of contract	Winter	Free	
28	MF	(China) Zhang Chengdong	35	(China) Qingdao West Coast	End of contract	Winter	Free	
23	MF	(China) Li Ke	31	(China) Shanghai Shenhua	End of contract	Winter	Free	
	FW	(China) Duan Dezhi	23	(China) Yunnan Yukun	End of contract	Winter	Free	
24	FW	(Nigeria) Samuel Adegbenro	29		End of contract	Winter	Free	
2	DF	(Mali) Mamadou Traoré	30	(China) Dalian Yingbo	End of contract	Winter	Free	
	DF	(China) Ruan Qilong	23	(China) Chongqing Tonglianglong	Transfer	Winter	€133K	
	DF	(China) He Xiaoqiang	22	(China) Chongqing Tonglianglong	Transfer	Winter	€265K	
	DF	(China) Liang Shaowen	22	(China) Shaanxi Union	Transfer	Winter	€230K	
	MF	(China) Ma Yujun	21	(China) Chongqing Tonglianglong	Transfer	Winter	€66K	
	FW	(China) Yan Yu	22	(China) Shaanxi Union	Transfer	Winter	€85K	
	MF	(China) Shi Yucheng	23	(China) Shenzhen Juniors	Loan	Winter	Free	
	DF	(China) Zhang Yixuan	20	(China) Qingdao Red Lions	Loan	Winter	Free	
43	DF	(China) Hao Yucheng	20	(China) Qingdao Red Lions	Loan	Winter	Free	
42	DF	(China) Yang Haocheng	21		End of contract	Winter	Free	

== Friendlies ==
=== Pre-season ===
27 December 2024 Friendly	Beijing Guoan	4–0	(China) Shandong Taishan U18	Kunming, Yunnan
	Wang Ziming 15'; Yan Yu 60', 80'; Fang Hao 62'
Note: Due to opponent's age, Guoan played the training match with a 10-man team

14 January 2025 Friendly	Beijing Guoan	2–0	(China) Changchun Yatai	Haikou, Hainan
	Zhang Xizhe (pen.); Jiang Wenhao

17 January 2025 Friendly	Beijing Guoan	4–2	(China) Chongqing Tonglianglong	Haikou, Hainan
	Abreu 24'; Fang Hao 32'; Zhang Xizhe 59'; Nebijan 67'		Cheng Yetong; Xiang Yuwang (pen.)

21 January 2025 Friendly	Beijing Guoan	2–3	(China) Dalian Yingbo	Haikou, Hainan
	Abreu 7'; Jin Pengxiang 18' (o.g.)		Malele 78'; Yan Xiangchuang 79'; Liu Yi 85'

24 January 2025 Friendly	(China) Shanghai Shenhua	1–4	Beijing Guoan	Haikou, Hainan
	Gao Tianyi 43'		Fang Hao 2', 11'; Feng Boxuan 58'; Zhang Yuning 67'

26 January 2025 Friendly	Beijing Guoan	1–0	(China) Nantong Zhiyun	Haikou, Hainan
10:30	Lin Liangming

4 February 2025 Friendly	Beijing Guoan	1–2	(South Korea) Hwaseong FC	Bangkok, Thailand
16:00 UTC+7	Abreu		Goal

8 February 2025 Friendly	Beijing Guoan	4–2	(China) Shenzhen Peng City	Bangkok, Thailand
	Abreu (pen.)		Zhou Dadi; Leonço

13 February 2025 Friendly	Beijing Guoan	1–1	(Thailand) Ratchaburi F.C.	Bangkok, Thailand
17:00 UTC+7	Abreu		Goal

14 February 2025 Friendly	Beijing Guoan	1–1	(China) Liaoning Tieren	Bangkok, Thailand
	Zhang Yuning		Kouamé

=== During season ===
15 March 2025 Friendly	Beijing Guoan	2–1	(China) Qingdao Hainiu	Beijing
	Fang Hao 58', 81'		Zheng Long

7 June 2025 Friendly	Beijing Guoan	2–2	(China) Tianjin Jinmen Tiger	Beijing
	Abreu; Fang Hao		Quiles; Ademi

14 November 2025 Friendly	(China) Tianjin Jinmen Tiger	1–2	Beijing Guoan	Tianjin
	Quiles		Zhang Yuning; Dawhan	Stadium: TEDA Soccer Stadium

== Competitions ==
=== Overview ===
Competition	First match	Last match	Starting round	Final position	Record							
Competition	First match	Last match	Starting round	Final position	Pld	W	D	L	GF	GA	GD	Win %
Chinese Super League	22 February	22 November	Matchday 1	4th	30	17	6	7	69	46	+23	56.67
Chinese FA Cup	21 May	6 December	Third round	Winners	5	3	2	0	18	3	+15	60.00
2025–26 AFC Champions League Two	18 September	11 December	Group stage	Group Stage	6	1	2	3	10	12	−2	16.67
Total					41	21	10	10	97	61	+36	51.22

Source: Soccerway

=== Chinese Super League ===
Beijing Guoan's 2025 Chinese Super League season commenced on 22 February and concluded on 22 November for a total of 30 matchdays.

==== Results summary ====
Overall								Home						Away					
Pld	W	D	L	GF	GA	GD	Pts	W	D	L	GF	GA	GD	W	D	L	GF	GA	GD
30	17	6	7	69	46	+23	57	10	2	3	38	20	+18	7	4	4	31	26	+5

Source: ESPN

==== Results by round ====
Round	1	2	3	4	5	7	8	9	10	11	12	13	14	6^{1}	15	16	17	18	19	20	21	22	23	24	25	26	27	28	29	30
Ground	A	A	H	A	H	A	H	H	A	A	H	A	H	H	A	H	H	A	H	A	A	H	A	A	H	H	A	H	A	H
Result	W	D	D	D	W	D	W	W	W	W	W	D	W	W	W	W	L	L	D	W	W	W	L	L	L	W	L	L	W	W
Position	2	3	7	8	5	5	5	4	3	3	3	3	3	1	1	1	2	3	4	4	3	2	4	4	4	4	4	4	4	4

Source: Competitive matches
A = Away; H = Home; W = Win; D = Draw; L = Loss
Notes:
- ^{1} Matchday 6 (v. Qingdao West Coast) was postponed due to high winds from polar vortex.

==== League table ====
Pos	Team	Pld	W	D	L	GF	GA	GD	Pts	Qualification or relegation
2	Shanghai Shenhua	30	19	7	4	67	35	+32	64	Qualification for AFC Champions League Two group stage
3	Chengdu Rongcheng	30	17	9	4	60	28	+32	60	
4	Beijing Guoan	30	17	6	7	69	46	+23	57	Qualification for AFC Champions League Elite league stage
5	Shandong Taishan	30	15	8	7	69	46	+23	53	
6	Tianjin Jinmen Tiger	30	12	8	10	40	41	−1	44	

Source: Soccerway
Rules for classification:
- During season: 1) Points; 2) Head-to-head points; 3) Head-to-head goal difference; 4) Head-to-head goals scored; 5) Goal difference; 6) Goals scored; 7) Rankings in the previous season. (Rules 2 to 4 are only applied when teams concerned have finished both/all the matches against others.)
- After season: 1) Points; 2) Head-to-head points; 3) Head-to-head goal difference; 4) Head-to-head goals scored; 5) Goal difference; 6) Goals scored; 7) Disciplinary points (yellow card = 1 point, red card = 3 points); 8) Drawing of lots.

==== Matches ====
22 February 2025 1	Yunnan Yukun	0–2	Beijing Guoan	Yuxi
20:00 UTC+8	Zhao Yuhao (yellow card) 70' (yellow-red card) 90+8'		Abreu 53'; Ngadeu (yellow card) 66'; Cao Yongjing 79'; Bai Yang (yellow card) 90' (yellow-red card) 90+10'	Stadium: Yuxi Plateau Sports Center Stadium; Attendance: 22,966; Referee: Tang Shunqi; Assistant referees: Cao Yi; Liu Xing; Fourth official: Shan Dan'ao

1 March 2025 2	Shanghai Shenhua	2–2	Beijing Guoan	Shanghai
19:35 UTC+8	Wu Xi 38'; Aidi (yellow card) 42'; André Luis 45+1' (pen.)		Lin Liangming 11'; Nebijan (yellow card) 30'; Han Jiaqi (yellow card) 45+1'; Spajić (yellow card) 45+7'; Zhang Yuan (yellow card) 72' (yellow-red card) 83'; Dawhan (yellow card) 85'; Bao Yaxiong 90+3' (o.g.)	Stadium: Shanghai Stadium; Attendance: 39,987; Referee: Memetjan Ahmat; Assistant referees: Shi Xiang; Zu Shanfa; Fourth official: Zhang Yangfan

29 March 2025 3	Beijing Guoan	1–1	Chengdu Rongcheng	Beijing
19:35 UTC+8	Spajić (yellow card) 5'; Abreu 18' (pen.); Ngadeu (red card) 67'; Zhang Yuning (yellow card) 84'		Yuan Mincheng (yellow card) 12'; De Erjiaduo (yellow card) 17'; Yang Mingyang (yellow card) 20'; Felipe 78'	Stadium: Workers' Stadium; Attendance: 52,982; Referee: Ma Ning; Assistant referees: Zhou Fei; Zhang Cheng; Fourth official: Gao Peng

2 April 2025 4	Tianjin Jinmen Tiger	2–2	Beijing Guoan	Tianjin
19:35 UTC+8	Quiles 71', 78'; Huang Jiahui (yellow card) 74'		Li Lei 27'; Wu Shaocong (yellow card) 45+3'; Fan Shuangjie (yellow card) 45+6'; Fang Hao (yellow card) 87'; Yang Fan 90+1' (o.g.)	Stadium: TEDA Soccer Stadium; Attendance: 30,200; Referee: Du Jianxin; Assistant referees: Sun Kai; Hu Chengjun; Fourth official: Wan Tao

6 April 2025 5	Beijing Guoan	2–0	Zhejiang	Beijing
19:35 UTC+8	Abreu 21'; Leung Nok Hang 55' (o.g.); Zhang Yuning (yellow card) 67'		Wang Yudong (yellow card) 59'	Stadium: Workers' Stadium; Attendance: 42,350; Referee: Li Haixin; Assistant referees: Luo Zheng; Xi Fei; Fourth official: Zhang Chao

15 April 2025 7	Wuhan Three Towns	4–4	Beijing Guoan	Wuhan
19:35 UTC+8	Palacios 31'; Liao Chengjian (yellow card) 76'; Zhong Jinbao 88'; Gustavo 90+4' (pen.); Zhang Zhenyang 90+10'		Abreu 3'; Zhang Yuning 23'; Sai Erjini'ao 34'; Yang Liyu 69'; Cao Yongjing (yellow card) 71'; Wang Gang (yellow card) 90+8'	Stadium: Wuhan Sports Center; Attendance: 7,329; Referee: Gan Shuran; Assistant referees: Liu Xing; Zhang Haijun; Fourth official: Gao Peng

19 April 2025 8	Beijing Guoan	6–1	Shandong Taishan	Beijing
19:35 UTC+8	Abreu 15', 52'; Guga 45+4'; Sai Erjini'ao 47'; Cao Yongjing (red card) 59'; Zhang Yuning 76'; Zhang Xizhe 90+1'		Zeca 4', (red card) 37'; Wu Xinghan (red card) 25'; Li Yuanyi (yellow card) 61'	Stadium: Workers' Stadium; Attendance: 54,309; Referee: Tang Shunqi; Assistant referees: Shi Xiang; Xie Lijun; Fourth official: Mu Yuchen

25 April 2025 9	Beijing Guoan	1–0	Henan	Beijing
19:35 UTC+8	Fang Hao 28'; Wang Gang (yellow card) 50'; Yang Liyu (yellow card) 81'; Zhang Xizhe (red card) 90'; Hou Sen (yellow card) 90+2'		Maia (yellow card) 15'; Wang Shangyuan (yellow card) 30'	Stadium: Workers' Stadium; Attendance: 44,018; Referee: Du Jianxin; Assistant referees: Sun Kai; Li Yingbin; Fourth official: Liang Songshang

1 May 2025 10	Shanghai Port	1–2	Beijing Guoan	Shanghai
19:35 UTC+8	Umidjan (yellow card) 23'; Jussa (yellow card) 31'; Liu Ruofan 40'		Abreu 42'; Lin Liangming 55'; Fang Hao (yellow card) 82'	Stadium: Pudong Football Stadium; Attendance: 23,785; Referee: Zhang Lei; Assistant referees: Liu Xing; Hu Chengjun; Fourth official: Zhang Chao

5 May 2025 11	Dalian Yingbo	0–2	Beijing Guoan	Dalian
15:30 UTC+8	Zhao Xuebin (yellow card) 56'		Wang Ziming 19'; Abreu 22'; Zhang Yuan (yellow card) 83'	Stadium: Dalian Suoyuwan Football Stadium; Attendance: 61,185; Referee: Wang Jing; Assistant referees: Deng Bo; Zu Shanfa; Fourth official: Zhu Wenbin

10 May 2025 12	Beijing Guoan	3–1	Shenzhen Peng City	Beijing
20:00 UTC+8	Lin Liangming 28'; Sai Erjini'ao 44'; Guga 71'		Kartsev (yellow card) 22'; Dugalić 49'; Wang Qiao (yellow card) 76'; Zhang Yujie (yellow card) 90+3'	Stadium: Workers' Stadium; Attendance: 46,232; Referee: Wang Di; Assistant referees: Zhang Zhe; Liu Zongqi; Fourth official: Cui Yong

17 May 2025 13	Qingdao Hainiu	1–1	Beijing Guoan	Qingdao
19:35 UTC+8	Jin Yangyang (yellow card) 35'; Liu Junshuai 90+4'		Abreu (yellow card) 45+1'; Ngadeu (yellow card) 49'; Lin Liangming 53'; Cao Yongjing (yellow card) 69'; Spajić (yellow card) 90+4'; Dawhan (yellow card) 90+6'	Stadium: Qingdao Youth Football Stadium; Attendance: 27,606; Referee: Jin Jingyuan; Assistant referees: Su Xiaofei; Wang Zhuo; Fourth official: Ma Yunkun

14 June 2025 14	Beijing Guoan	2–1	Changchun Yatai	Beijing
19:00 UTC+8	Zhang Xizhe 18'; Cao Yongjing 25'	Report	Sunzu (yellow card) 37'; Xu Yue (yellow card) 39'; Li Shenyuan (yellow card) 70'; Tan Long 88'; Wang Yu (yellow card) 90+1'	Stadium: Workers' Stadium; Attendance: 46,269; Referee: Tang Shunqi; Assistant referees: Tang Rongdi; Xie Lijun; Fourth official: Zhen Wei

17 June 2025 6	Beijing Guoan	1–0	Qingdao West Coast	Beijing
19:35 UTC+8	Ngadeu 24'; Wu Shaocong (yellow card) 90+7'	Report	Xu Bin (yellow card) 27'; Davidson (yellow card) 50'; Alex Yang (yellow card) 71'; Zhao Honglüe (yellow card) 73'	Stadium: Workers' Stadium; Attendance: 40,516; Referee: Shen Yinhao; Assistant referees: Luo Zheng; Deng Bo; Fourth official: Cui Yong
Note: Fixture was initially scheduled for a 20:00 kick-off on 11 April, but was later postponed to 17 June due to high winds caused by a polar vortex.

25 June 2025 15	Meizhou Hakka	0–4	Beijing Guoan	Wuhua
19:35 UTC+8		Report	Abreu 21', 45+1', 69'; Fan Shuangjie (yellow card) 50'; Fang Hao 55'; Spajić (yellow card) 86'; Nebijan (yellow card) 90+5'	Stadium: Huitang Stadium; Attendance: 12,395; Referee: Zhang Yangfan; Assistant referees: Wu Mingfeng; Lü Pin; Fourth official: Yan Lifu

30 June 2025 16	Beijing Guoan	2–1	Yunnan Yukun	Beijing
19:35 UTC+8	Abreu 55'; Fang Hao (yellow card) 76'; Zhang Xizhe 83' (pen.), (yellow card) 90+11'	Report	Ye Chugui (yellow card) 22', (goal) 30'; Nené (yellow card) 68'; Tsui Wang Kit (yellow card) 73'; Han Zilong (yellow card) 90+9'	Stadium: Workers' Stadium; Attendance: 41,572; Referee: Gan Shuran; Assistant referees: Wang Xihong; Su Xiaofei; Fourth official: Jia Zhiliang

19 July 2025 17	Beijing Guoan	1–3	Shanghai Shenhua	Beijing
19:35 UTC+8	Guga 26'; Wang Gang (yellow card) 51'	Report	Asué 7'; Wu Xi 21'; Yang Haoyu (yellow card) 35'; Li Ke (yellow card) 62'; Yu Hanchao (yellow card) 90+5', (goal) 90+7'	Stadium: Workers' Stadium; Attendance: 62,291; Referee: Ma Ning; Assistant referees: Shi Xiang; Ma Ji; Fourth official: Wan Tao

26 July 2025 18	Chengdu Rongcheng	2–0	Beijing Guoan	Chengdu
19:35 UTC+8	De Erjiaduo 33'; Letschert 66'	Report	Wang Gang (yellow card) 90+6'	Stadium: Phoenix Hill Football Stadium; Attendance: 41,307; Referee: Wang Jing; Assistant referees: Zhou Fei; Zhang Cheng; Fourth official: Yan Lifu

3 August 2025 19	Beijing Guoan	2–2	Tianjin Jinmen Tiger	Beijing
19:35 UTC+8	Dawhan 43'; Abreu 70'; Chi Zhongguo (yellow card) 73'	Report	Quiles 21', 52'; Yan Bingliang (yellow card) 90+8'	Stadium: Workers' Stadium; Attendance: 54,649; Referee: Dai Yige; Assistant referees: Guo Jingtao; Wu Mingfeng; Fourth official: Gao Peng

10 August 2025 20	Zhejiang	3–4	Beijing Guoan	Hangzhou
19:35 UTC+8	Lucas 21'; Mitriță 45+3'; Wang Yudong 46'; Cheng Jin (red card) 62'; Owusu-Sekyere (yellow card) 90+10'	Report	Guga 24'; Wang Gang (yellow card) 49'; Cao Yongjing 54'; Abreu 65'; Wang Ziming 76'; Nebijan (yellow card) 90+10'	Stadium: Huanglong Sports Center Stadium; Attendance: 34,175; Referee: Memetjan Ahmet; Assistant referees: Shi Xiang; Guan Changliang; Fourth official: Sun Shengyu

16 August 2025 21	Qingdao West Coast	1–3	Beijing Guoan	Qingdao
19:00 UTC+8	Yang Xi (yellow card) 77'; Duan Liuyu (yellow card) 89'; Davidson 90+10' (pen.)	Report	Abreu 39', 85', (yellow card) 54'; Li Lei (yellow card) 45+2'; Cao Yongjing (yellow card) 65'; Lin Liangming 80'	Stadium: Qingdao West Coast University City Sports Center; Attendance: 20,013; Referee: Tang Shunqi; Assistant referees: Wang Xihong; Wang Zhuo; Fourth official: Zhu Wenbin

25 August 2025 22	Beijing Guoan	4–0	Wuhan Three Towns	Beijing
20:00 UTC+8	Abreu 32' (pen.); Sai Erjini'ao 45+6'; Lin Liangming 53'; Zhang Yuning 61'; Nebijan (yellow card) 71'; Fan Shuangjie (yellow card) 90+3'	Report	Park Ji-soo (yellow card) 51'; Liu Yiming (yellow card) 59'; He Guan (yellow card) 83'; Wang Yi (yellow card) 85'	Stadium: Workers' Stadium; Attendance: 41,081; Referee: Mu Yuchen; Assistant referees: Luo Zheng; Li Peng; Fourth official: Zhang Chao
Note: Fixture was initially scheduled for a 20:00 kick-off on 23 August, but was later postponed to 25 August.

31 August 2025 23	Shandong Taishan	6–0	Beijing Guoan	Jinan
19:35 UTC+8	Qazaishvili 15', 22', 43', 71'; Huang Zhengyu (yellow card) 19'; Gao Zhunyi (yellow card) 76'; Madruga 45', 62', (yellow card) 90'	Report	Ngadeu (yellow card) 14'; Bai Yang (yellow card) 66'; Fan Shuangjie (yellow card) 86'; Jiang Wenhao (yellow card) 90+3'	Stadium: Jinan Olympic Sports Center Stadium; Attendance: 40,619; Referee: Adham Makhadmeh (Jordan); Assistant referees: Shi Xiang; Guan Changliang; Fourth official: Xiong Xing

12 September 2025 24	Henan	2–0	Beijing Guoan	Zhengzhou
19:35 UTC+8	Zhong Yihao 40', (yellow card) 41'; Felippe Cardoso 85' (pen.)	Report	Wu Shaocong (yellow card) 49'; Bai Yang (yellow card) 62'; Wang Gang (yellow card) 77'	Stadium: Hanghai Stadium; Attendance: 21,151; Referee: Gan Shuran; Assistant referees: Hu Chengjun; Zhang Chao; Fourth official: Jia Zhiliang

21 September 2025 25	Beijing Guoan	2–3	Shanghai Port	Beijing
18:00 UTC+8	Abreu 45+11' (pen.); Zhang Xizhe 86'	Report	Leonardo 7', 51', 79'; Wang Shenchao (yellow card) 45+10'	Stadium: Workers' Stadium; Attendance: 42,793; Referee: Alex King (Australia; Assistant referees: Ma Ji; Wu Mingfeng; Fourth official: Shan Dan'ao

26 September 2025 26	Beijing Guoan	4–2	Dalian Yingbo	Beijing
19:35 UTC+8	Cao Yongjing (yellow card) 8'; Abreu 29', 53', 78'; Sai Erjini'ao 36'	Report	Traoré (yellow card) 42'; Wang Gang 55' (o.g.); Daniel Penha 56'; Liao Jintao (yellow card) 69'	Stadium: Workers' Stadium; Attendance: 36,817; Referee: Memetjan Ahmet; Assistant referees: Liu Xing; Alimjan Abdukadir; Fourth official: Sun Shengyu

18 October 2025 27	Shenzhen Peng City	2–1	Beijing Guoan	Zhaoqing
16:00 UTC+8	García 13'; Nan Song (yellow card) 31'; Wesley 33'; Kartsev (yellow card) 41'	Report	Zhang Yuning 67'	Stadium: Zhaoqing New District Sports Center Stadium; Attendance: 11,829; Referee: Jin Jingyuan; Assistant referees: Cao Yi; Tang Rongdi; Fourth official: Shan Dan'ao

26 October 2025 28	Beijing Guoan	2–4	Qingdao Hainiu	Beijing
19:35 UTC+8	Abreu 20'; Sai Erjini'ao 59'	Report	Silva (yellow card) 32', (goal) 90+1'; Filipe Augusto (yellow card) 32'; Jin Yangyang (yellow card) 51'; Sarić 56' (pen.), 86', 90+7', (yellow card) 87'; Mewlan (yellow card) 90+4'	Stadium: Workers' Stadium; Attendance: 30,035; Referee: Ma Ning; Assistant referees: Zhou Fei; Zhang Cheng; Fourth official: Dong Fangyu

1 November 2025 29	Changchun Yatai	0–4	Beijing Guoan	Changchun
15:30 UTC+8	Afrden (yellow card) 12'; Salazar (yellow card) 27'; Peng Xinli (yellow card) 40'	Report	He Yupeng (yellow card) 11'; Sai Erjini'ao 19'; Abreu 45+13' (pen.), 82'; Zhang Yuning 77'; Ngadeu (yellow card) 84'	Stadium: Changchun Stadium; Attendance: 14,132; Referee: Wang Jing; Assistant referees: Sun Kai; Zhang Chao; Fourth official: Zhu Wenbin

22 November 2025 30	Beijing Guoan	5–1	Meizhou Hakka	Beijing
15:30 UTC+8	Abreu 18', 45+4', 71', 87'; Zhang Yuning 56'; Fang Hao (yellow card) 89'	Report	Liao Junjian (yellow card) 21'; Ómarsson (yellow card) 45+4', (goal) 64'	Stadium: Workers' Stadium; Attendance: 38,713; Referee: Xing Qi; Assistant referees: Shi Xiang; Deng Bo; Fourth official: Gu Chunhan

=== Chinese FA Cup ===
Guoan joined the competition in the third round on 21 May and proceeded to win the competition on 6 December.

21 May 2025 Third round	Shijiazhuang Gongfu	0–5	Beijing Guoan	Shijiazhuang
19:30 UTC+8	Zhan Sainan (red card) 55'		Dawhan 16'; Wang Ziming 30', 76'; Zhang Xizhe 57'; Zhang Yuan 68'	Stadium: Yutong International Sports Center; Attendance: 10,530; Referee: Memetjan Ahmet; Assistant referees: Ma Ji; Tang Rongdi; Fourth official: He Xiaochun

21 June 2025 Fourth round	Dalian Yingbo	1–1 (a.e.t.) (5–6 p)	Beijing Guoan	Dalian
19:00 UTC+8	Jin Pengxiang (yellow card) 42'; Malele 45' (pen.); Zhu Pengyu (yellow card) 67'; Song Yue (yellow card) 90'; Lü Zhuoyi (yellow card) 90'		Spajić (yellow card) 57'; Zhang Yuning 90'; Zheng Tuluo (yellow card) 90+9'	Stadium: Dalian Suoyuwan Football Stadium; Attendance: 60,028; Referee: Gan Shuran; Assistant referees: Guo Jingtao; Wu Mingfeng; Fourth official: Liang Songshang
	Penalties
	Malele (penalty missed); Cao Haiqing (penalty scored); Liao Jintao (penalty scored); Zhao Xuebin (penalty scored); Alimi (penalty missed); Lü Zhuoyi (penalty scored); Karanga (penalty scored); Liu Yi (penalty missed)		(penalty missed) Abreu; (penalty scored) Spajić; (penalty missed) Guga; (penalty scored) Dawhan; (penalty scored) Sai Erjini'ao; (penalty scored) Zhang Yuning; (penalty scored) Ngadeu; (penalty scored) Nebijan

22 July 2025 Quarter-finals	Qingdao West Coast	2–2 (a.e.t.) (2–4 p)	Beijing Guoan	Qingdao
19:00 UTC+8	Matheus Índio (yellow card) 36'; Yakubu 62'; Nebijan 119' (o.g.)		Wang Ziming 52', (yellow card) 106'; Spajić (yellow card) 58'; Nebijan (yellow card) 90+6'; Cao Yongjing 117', (yellow card) 117'	Stadium: Qingdao West Coast University City Sports Center; Attendance: 18,677; Referee: Shan Dan'ao; Assistant referees: Liu Xing; Deng Peng; Fourth official: Wan Tao
	Penalties
	Yakubu (penalty missed); Matheus Índio (penalty missed); Duan Liuyu (penalty scored); Ding Haifeng (penalty scored)		(penalty scored) Abreu; (penalty scored) Ngadeu; (penalty scored) Nebijan; (penalty scored) Dawhan

20 August 2025 Semi-finals	Beijing Guoan	7–0	Yunnan Yukun	Beijing
19:35 UTC+8	Abreu 26'; Wang Gang 38'; Wu Shaocong (yellow card) 40'; Guga 45+4'; Lin Liangming 64'; Jiang Wenhao 70'; Zhang Xizhe 76'; Zhang Yuning 78'		Burcă (red card) 31'	Stadium: Workers' Stadium; Attendance: 48,099; Referee: Liu Wei; Assistant referees: Deng Bo; Zhang Haijun; Fourth official: Dai Yige

6 December 2025 Final	Beijing Guoan	0–3	Henan	Suzhou
19:00 UTC+8	Abreu 16', 45+7' (pen.), 90+2' (pen.); Cao Yongjing (yellow card) 33'; Ngadeu (yellow card) 45+1'; Dawhan (yellow card) 57'; Wu Shaocong (yellow card) 61'		Lu Yongtao (yellow card) 20'; Zhong Yihao (yellow card) 70'	Stadium: Suzhou Olympic Sports Centre; Attendance: 40,558; Referee: Ko Hyung-jin (Korea); Assistant referees: Shi Xiang; Ma Ji; Fourth official: Wang Di

=== AFC Champions League Two ===
Guoan joined the competition in the group stage on 18 September. The team was drawn into Group E on 15 August, and failed to advance from the group stage after losing to Công An Hà Nội FC on 27 November.

==== Group stage ====
Pos	Team	Pld	W	D	L	GF	GA	GD	Pts	Qualification	MAC	HNP	TPF	BJG
1	(Australia) Macarthur FC	6	4	1	1	11	6	+5	13	Advance to round of 16	—	2–1	2–1	3–0
2	(Vietnam) Công An Hà Nội	6	2	2	2	9	7	+2	8	Advance to round of 16	1–1	—	3–0	2–1
3	(Hong Kong) Tai Po	6	2	1	3	7	12	−5	7		2–1	1–0	—	3–3
4	(China) Beijing Guoan	6	1	2	3	10	12	−2	5		1–2	2–2	3–0	—

Source: ACL2
Rules for classification: Tiebreakers

18 September 2025 1	Beijing Guoan (China)	2–2	(Vietnam) Công An Hà Nội	Beijing, China
20:15 UTC+8	Chi Zhongguo 49'; Zhang Yuan 65'; Wu Shaocong (yellow card) 82'; Wang Ziming (yellow card) 86'	Report	Vitão 15'; China 73'; Pendant (yellow card) 82'; Mauk (yellow card) 86'	Stadium: Workers' Stadium; Attendance: 20,071; Referee: Wiwat Jumpaoon (Thailand); Assistant referees: Pattarapong Kijsathit (Thailand); Chotrawee Thongduang (Thailand); Fourth official: Songkran Bunmeekiart (Thailand)

2 October 2025 2	Macarthur (Australia)	3–0	(China) Beijing Guoan	Sydney, Australia
17:45 UTC+10	Ikonomidis 4'; Uskok 58'; Gržan 89'	Report		Stadium: Campbelltown Sports Stadium; Attendance: 2,960; Referee: Mohammed Ahmed Al-Shammari (Qatar); Assistant referees: Khalid Al-Ayed Khalaf (Qatar); Faisal Eid Al-Shammari (Qatar); Fourth official: Wong Wai-Lun (Hong Kong)

23 October 2025 3	Tai Po (Hong Kong)	3–3	(China) Beijing Guoan	Hong Kong
18:00 UTC+8	Michel Renner 17', 90'; Temelkovski 29' (pen.); Daciel (yellow card) 64'; Weverton Rangel (yellow card) 78'; Chung Wai Keung (yellow card) 89'	Report	Bai Yang 36'; Ngadeu 53'; Fan Shuangjie (yellow card) 69'; Abreu 83'	Stadium: Mong Kok Stadium; Attendance: 3,324; Referee: Sashanka Madushanka (Sri Lanka); Assistant referees: Parakkrama Hemathunga (Sri Lanka); Buddhika Dias (Sri Lanka); Fourth official: Jafran (Sri Lanka)

6 November 2025 4	Beijing Guoan (China)	3–0	(Hong Kong) Tai Po	Beijing, China
20:15 UTC+8	He Yupeng (yellow card) 36'; Zhang Yuning (yellow card) 42', (goal) 46'; Sai Erjini'ao 85', 90+6'		Cividini (yellow card) 41'	Stadium: Workers' Stadium; Attendance: 21,371; Referee: Mahmood Salim Said Al-Majarafi (Oman); Assistant referees: Hamood Said Al-Shuaibi (Oman); Salim Mohammed Al-Abri (Oman); Fourth official: Omar Al-Yaqoubi (Oman)

27 November 2025 5	Công An Hà Nội (Vietnam)	2–1	(China) Beijing Guoan	Hanoi, Vietnam
19:15 UTC+7	Adou (yellow card) 17'; Mauk 76'; Nguyễn Đình Bắc 90', (yellow card) 90+1'; China (yellow card) 90+4'	Report	Lin Liangming 11'; Cao Yongjing (yellow card) 66', (red card) 90+3'; Wang Gang (yellow card) 90+4'	Stadium: Hàng Đẫy Stadium; Referee: Ahmed Mohamed Khalil Saad (Bahrain); Assistant referees: Faisal Alawi Sayed Shubber (Bahrain); Salman Mohamed Ebrahim Mohamed Salman Talasi (Bahrain); Fourth official: Mohamed Khaled Tarrar Mohamed Deham (Bahrain)

11 December 2025 6	Beijing Guoan (China)	1–2	(Australia) Macarthur	Beijing, China
20:15 UTC+8	Ngadeu (yellow card) 32'; Sai Erjini'ao 59'; Bai Yang (yellow card) 70' (yellow-red card) 90+9'; Fang Hao (yellow card) 84'; Zhang Jianzhi (yellow card) 90+9'; Jiang Wenhao (yellow card) 90+9'	Report	Popovic 56', (yellow card) 56'; Sawyer 71' (pen.), (yellow card) 90+8'; Robinson (yellow card) 74'; Scott (yellow card) 84'	Stadium: Workers' Stadium; Attendance: 20,759; Referee: Shiekh Ahmad Omar Al-Aeddin (Lebanon); Assistant referees: Ali Mokdad (Lebanon); Ahmad Al-Housseini (Lebanon); Fourth official: Hussein Abo Yehia (Lebanon)

== Statistics ==
=== Appearances and goals ===
As of the end of the 2025 season

No.	Pos.	Nat.	Name	Chinese Super League		Chinese FA Cup		2025–26 AFC Champions League Two		Total	
No.	Pos.	Nat.	Name	Apps	Goals	Apps	Goals	Apps	Goals	Apps	Goals
1	GK	(China)	Han Jiaqi	6	0	0	0	0	0	6	0
2	DF	(China)	Wu Shaocong	17(3)	0	4(1)	0	1(2)	0	22(6)	0
3	DF	(China)	He Yupeng	4(5)	0	0(1)	0	3	0	7(6)	0
4	DF	(China)	Li Lei	7(9)	1	4(1)	0	1(2)	0	12(12)	1
5	DF	(Cameroon)	Michael Ngadeu-Ngadjui	21(1)	1	2(1)	0	6	1	29(2)	2
6	MF	(China)	Chi Zhongguo	5(5)	0	4	0	3	1	12(5)	1
7	MF	(China)	Sai Erjini'ao	23(3)	7	1(2)	0	2(2)	3	26(7)	10
8	MF	(Portugal)	Guga	26(3)	4	2(2)	1	2(1)	0	30(6)	5
9	FW	(China)	Zhang Yuning	13(14)	6	2(2)	2	3(1)	1	18(17)	9
10	MF	(China)	Zhang Xizhe	3(13)	4	2(2)	2	4	0	9(15)	6
11	FW	(China)	Lin Liangming	21(4)	6	2	1	2(3)	1	25(7)	8
15	DF	(Serbia)	Uroš Spajić	9(2)	0	3	0	0	0	12(2)	0
16	DF	(China)	Feng Boxuan	3(5)	0	2	0	2(1)	0	7(6)	0
17	FW	(China)	Yang Liyu	4(12)	1	2(1)	0	3(1)	0	9(14)	1
18	FW	(China)	Fang Hao	3(13)	2	0(4)	0	1(3)	0	4(20)	2
19	DF	(China)	Nebijan Muhmet	5(8)	0	1(2)	0	2	0	8(10)	0
20	FW	(China)	Wang Ziming	3(9)	2	3	3	1(1)	0	7(10)	5
21	MF	(China)	Zhang Yuan	4(10)	0	1	1	6	1	11(10)	2
23	MF	(Brazil)	Dawhan	25(1)	1	4	1	3	0	32(1)	2
25	GK	(Paraguay)	Zheng Tuluo	0	0	1	0	0	0	1	0
26	DF	(China)	Bai Yang	14(4)	0	1(2)	0	4(1)	1	19(7)	1
27	DF	(China)	Wang Gang	22(2)	0	5	1	2	0	29(2)	1
28	MF	(China)	Li Ruiyue	1(3)	0	0	0	0(1)	0	1(4)	0
29	FW	(Angola)	Fábio Abreu	30	28	2(2)	4	3(2)	1	33(4)	33
30	DF	(China)	Fan Shuangjie	10(7)	0	1(1)	0	2(2)	0	13(10)	0
33	GK	(China)	Nureli Abbas	0	0	0	0	2	0	2	0
34	GK	(China)	Hou Sen	23(1)	0	4	0	0	0	27(1)	0
35	DF	(China)	Jiang Wenhao	2(1)	0	0(1)	1	3(2)	0	4(4)	1
37	MF	(China)	Cao Yongjing	25(3)	3	2(2)	1	2(3)	0	29(8)	4
39	GK	(China)	Zhang Jianzhi	0	0	0	0	4	0	4	0
40	GK	(China)	Xie Jintian (Note: Player was deregistered from the club's first team during the summer window)	0	0	0	0	0	0	0	0
41	FW	(China)	Wang Zihao	0	0	0	0	0	0	0	0
42	DF	(China)	Dai Jinyu	0	0	0	0	0	0	0	0
43	FW	(China)	Wang Yuxiang	0	0	0	0	0	0	0	0
44	DF	(China)	Li Shanghan	0	0	0	0	0	0	0	0
45	GK	(China)	Yao Boqing	0	0	0	0	0	0	0	0
63	MF	(China)	Wei Jia'ao	0	0	0	0	0(1)	0	0(1)	0
71	GK	(China)	Lu Tongyun	0	0	0	0	0	0	0	0

=== Goals ===
As of the end of the 2025 season

Rank	Position	Name	Chinese Super League	Chinese FA Cup	2025–26 AFC Champions League Two	Total
1	FW	(Angola) Fábio Abreu	28	4	1	33
2	MF	(China) Sai Erjini'ao	7	0	3	10
3	FW	(China) Zhang Yuning	6	2	1	9
4	FW	(China) Lin Liangming	6	1	1	8
5	MF	(China) Zhang Xizhe	4	2	0	6
6	FW	(China) Wang Ziming	2	3	0	5
6	MF	(Portugal) Guga	4	1	0	5
8	MF	(China) Cao Yongjing	3	1	0	4
9	FW	(China) Fang Hao	2	0	0	2
9	MF	(Brazil) Dawhan	1	1	0	2
9	MF	(China) Zhang Yuan	0	1	1	2
9	DF	(Cameroon) Michael Ngadeu-Ngadjui	1	0	1	2
13	DF	(China) Li Lei	1	0	0	1
13	FW	(China) Yang Liyu	1	0	0	1
13	DF	(China) Wang Gang	0	1	0	1
13	DF	(China) Jiang Wenhao	0	1	0	1
13	MF	(China) Chi Zhongguo	0	0	1	1
13	DF	(China) Bai Yang	0	0	1	1
Opposition own goals			3	0	0	3
Total			69	18	10	97

=== Assists ===
As of the end of the 2025 season

Rank	Position	Name	Chinese Super League	Chinese FA Cup	2025–26 AFC Champions League Two	Total
1	MF	(China) Sai Erjini'ao	5	3	0	8
2	MF	(Brazil) Dawhan	6	0	1	7
3	MF	(Portugal) Guga	6	0	0	6
3	FW	(Angola) Fábio Abreu	6	0	0	6
3	FW	(China) Yang Liyu	4	0	2	6
3	MF	(China) Zhang Xizhe	4	1	1	6
7	FW	(China) Zhang Yuning	3	2	0	5
7	FW	(China) Lin Liangming	3	2	0	5
9	MF	(China) Zhang Yuan	2	1	1	4
10	DF	(China) Nebijan Muhmet	2	1	0	3
11	MF	(China) Cao Yongjing	2	0	0	2
11	DF	(China) He Yupeng	1	0	1	2
11	FW	(China) Fang Hao	1	1	0	2
11	DF	(China) Feng Boxuan	0	1	1	2
15	DF	(China) Li Lei	0	1	0	1
15	DF	(Serbia) Uroš Spajić	1	0	0	1
15	DF	(Cameroon) Michael Ngadeu-Ngadjiu	0	1	0	1
15	DF	(China) Bai Yang	1	0	0	1
15	DF	(China) Wang Gang	1	0	0	1
Total			48	14	7	69

=== Clean sheets ===
As of the end of the 2025 season

Rank	Name	Chinese Super League	Chinese FA Cup	2025–26 AFC Champions League Two	Total
1	(China) Hou Sen	6	2	0	8
2	(China) Han Jiaqi	2	0	0	2
3	(Paraguay) Zheng Tuluo	0	1	0	1
3	(China) Zhang Jianzhi	0	0	1	1
Total		8	2	1	11

Numbers in parentheses represent games where both goalkeepers participated and both kept a clean sheet; the number in parentheses is awarded to the goalkeeper who was substituted on, whilst a full clean sheet is awarded to the goalkeeper who was on the field at the start of play.

=== Disciplinary record ===
N	P	Nat.	Name	Chinese Super League			Chinese FA Cup			2025–26 AFC Champions League Two			Total			Notes
N	P	Nat.	Name	Yellow card	Second yellow card	Red card	Yellow card	Second yellow card	Red card	Yellow card	Second yellow card	Red card	Yellow card	Second yellow card	Red card	Notes
5	DF	(Cameroon)	Michael Ngadeu-Ngadjui	4		1	1			1			6		1	
26	DF	(China)	Bai Yang	2	1						1		2	2		
19	DF	(China)	Nebijan Muhmet	4			1						5			
1	GK	(China)	Han Jiaqi	1									1			
15	DF	(Serbia)	Uroš Spajić	4			2						6			
21	MF	(China)	Zhang Yuan	1	1								1	1		
23	MF	(Brazil)	Dawhan	2			1						3			
9	FW	(China)	Zhang Yuning	2						1			3			
2	DF	(China)	Wu Shaocong	3			2			1			6			
30	DF	(China)	Fan Shuangjie	4						1			5			
18	FW	(China)	Fang Hao	4						1			5			
37	MF	(China)	Cao Yongjing	4		1	2			1		1	7		2	
27	DF	(China)	Wang Gang	6						1			7			
17	FW	(China)	Yang Liyu	1									1			
10	MF	(China)	Zhang Xizhe	1		1							1		1	
34	GK	(China)	Hou Sen	1									1			
29	FW	(Angola)	Fábio Abreu	2									2			
25	GK	(Paraguay)	Zheng Tuluo				1						1			
6	MF	(China)	Chi Zhongguo	1									1			
4	DF	(China)	Li Lei	1									1			
20	FW	(China)	Wang Ziming				1			1			2			
35	DF	(China)	Jiang Wenhao	1						1			2			
3	DF	(China)	He Yupeng	1						1			2			
39	GK	(China)	Zhang Jianzhi							1			1			

Only competitive matches
(yellow card) = Number of bookings; (second yellow card) = Number of sending offs after a second yellow card; (red card) = Number of sending offs by a direct red card.

== Awards and nominations ==
=== Matchday awards ===
==== Chinese Super League Player of the Round ====
Matchday	Pos.	Player	Result	Ref.
5	FW	(Angola) Fábio Abreu	Nominated	
7	FW	(Angola) Fábio Abreu	Nominated	
8	FW	(Angola) Fábio Abreu	Won	
9	FW	(China) Fang Hao	Nominated	
11	MF	(Portugal) Guga	Nominated	
12	MF	(Portugal) Guga	Nominated	
14	MF	(China) Zhang Xizhe	Nominated	
6	DF	(Cameroon) Michael Ngadeu-Ngadjui	Nominated	
21	FW	(Angola) Fábio Abreu	Won	
22	FW	(China) Lin Liangming	Nominated	
26	FW	(Angola) Fábio Abreu	Won	
29	FW	(Angola) Fábio Abreu	Nominated	
30	FW	(Angola) Fábio Abreu	Won	

=== Monthly awards ===
==== Guoan Player of the Month ====
The winners of the award were chosen by club-organized fan and media vote with fan votes weighing 80% and media votes weighing the remaining 20%.

Month	Pos.	Player	Pld	G	A	CS	Votes	Ref.
February and March	GK	(China) Han Jiaqi	3	0	0	1	72% fans, 62.5% media 70.1% total	
April	FW	(Angola) Fábio Abreu	5	4	3	–	63% fans, 50% media 60.4% total	
May	FW	(China) Lin Liangming	4	3	1	–	64% fans, 75% media 66.2% total	
June	GK	(China) Hou Sen	5	0	0	2	35% fans, 62.5% media 40.5% total	

==== Chinese Super League Player of the Month ====
Month	Pos.	Player	Result	Ref.
February and March	FW	(Angola) Fábio Abreu	Nominated	
April	FW	(Angola) Fábio Abreu	Won	
April	MF	(Portugal) Guga	Nominated	
May	FW	(China) Lin Liangming	Nominated	
August	FW	(Angola) Fábio Abreu	Nominated	
November	FW	(Angola) Fábio Abreu	Won	
November	GK	(China) Hou Sen	Nominated	

==== Chinese Super League Team of the Month ====
Month	Pos.	Player	Pld	G	A	CS	S	Ref.
February and March	GK	(China) Han Jiaqi	3	0	0	1	13	
April	FW	(Angola) Fábio Abreu	5	3	2	–	–	
April	MF	(Portugal) Guga	5	1	2	–	–	
May	FW	(China) Lin Liangming	4	3	1	–	–	
May	MF	(Portugal) Guga	4	1	2	–	–	
June	FW	(Angola) Fábio Abreu	5	4	1	–	–	
November	FW	(Angola) Fábio Abreu	2	6	1	–	–	
November	GK	(China) Hou Sen	2	0	0	1	11	

==== Chinese Super League Goalkeeper of the Month ====
Month	Player	Result	Ref.
February and March	(China) Han Jiaqi	Won	
November	(China) Hou Sen	Won	

==== Chinese Super League Manager of the Month ====
Month	Manager	M	W	D	L	GF	GA	GD	Pts	Pos	Result	Ref.
May	(Spain) Quique Setién	4	3	1	0	8	3	+5	10	3rd	Won	
June	(Spain) Quique Setién	5	4	1	0	10	3	+7	13	1st	Won	

=== Annual Awards ===
==== Chinese Super League Player of the Season ====
Pos.	Player	Result	Ref.
FW	(Angola) Fábio Abreu	Nominated	
MF	(Portugal) Guga	Nominated	

==== Chinese Super League Team of the Season ====
Pos.	Player	Result	Ref.
FW	(Angola) Fábio Abreu	Won	

==== Chinese Super League Goalkeeper of the Season ====
Pos.	Player	Result	Ref.
GK	(China) Hou Sen	Nominated	

==== Chinese Super League Young Player of the Season ====
Pos.	Player	Result	Ref.
DF	(China) Fan Shuangjie	Nominated	
