= Zhuoyi =

Zhuoyi (Chinese: 卓) is a Chinese given name. Notable people with the name include:

- Feng Zhuoyi, Chinese footballer
- Lü Zhuoyi (born 2001), Chinese footballer
- Xu Zhuoyi (born 2003), Chinese hurdler
