= Zhang Jianzhi =

Zhang Jianzhi may refer to:

- Zhang Jianzhi (footballer)
- Zhang Jianzhi (Tang dynasty)
