= Fan Shuangjie =

Chinese footballer (born 2005)

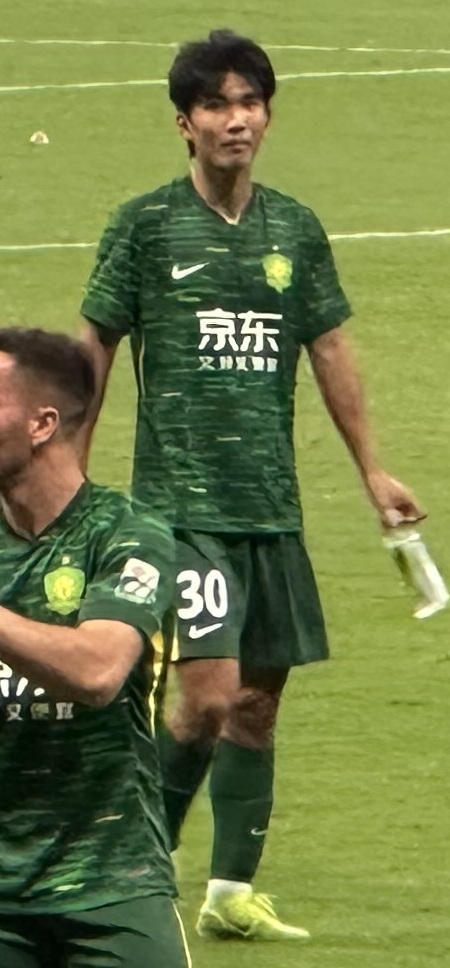
- Fan Shuangjie in June 2025

Personal information
- Full name: Fan Shuangjie
- Date of birth: 25 August 2005 (age 21)
- Place of birth: Tongshan County, Jiangsu, China
- Height: 1.87 m (6 ft 2 in)
- Positions: Centre-back; defensive midfielder

Team information
- Current team: Beijing Guoan
- Number: 30

Youth career
- 2018–2024: Beijing Guoan

Senior career*
Years	Team	Apps	(Gls)
2024–	Beijing Guoan	21	(0)
- * Club domestic league appearances and goals as of 19 November 2026

Fan Shuangjie (simplified Chinese: 范双杰; traditional Chinese: 范雙杰; pinyin: Fàn Shuāngjié; born 25 August 2005) is a Chinese professional footballer who plays as a centre-back or defensive midfielder for Chinese Super League club Beijing Guoan.

== Early life ==
Born in Xuzhou, Jiangsu, Fan Shuangjie joined the youth academy of Chinese Super League club Beijing Guoan at the age of thirteen. In 2019, Fan participated in the 2019 Youth Games of the People's Republic of China with the Beijing Dongcheng Youth Amateur Sports School football team; his team finished fourth in the competition.

In April 2021, Fan was selected as part of an elites' training camp hosted by the Chinese Football Association.

== Club career ==
=== Beijing Guoan ===
In the summer player registration period of 2024, Fan was promoted to the Beijing Guoan first-team. On 19 October 2024, Fan Shuangjie made his senior and professional debut in a 6–0 Chinese Super League home win over Qingdao Hainiu, coming on as a 77th minute substitute for Li Lei, playing in the centre-back position. In a post-match interview, Fan stated that he felt nervous.

On 2 April 2025, he made his first appearance of the 2025 season, replacing Uroš Spajić in the sixth minute of added time in the first half. On 19 April 2025, Fan made his first start for the club and played the full ninety minutes as a defensive midfielder as well as a centre-back in a 6–1 win over league rivals Shandong Taishan. After the following game on 25 April, Fan picked up a thigh injury which kept him unavailable until the Chinese FA Cup match against China League One side Shijiazhuang Gongfu on 21 May.

== International career ==
In July 2023, Fan Shuangjie was called up by China U18 in preparation for the 31st Japan-Korea-China Junior Sports Exchange Meet. On 26 August, Fan scored an equalising goal in a 3–1 loss to Japan's Kokoku High School. On the following day, he scored China's second goal against South Korea's representative team in a 3–1 win.

On 19 January 2024, Fan was selected to participate in a training camp with the China U19 national team.

In February 2025, Fan was part of China U20's provisional squad for the 2025 AFC U-20 Asian Cup. However, he was not included in their final squad for the tournament.

== Career statistics ==
=== Club ===
As of 6 November 2025

Appearances and goals by club, season, and competition
Club	Season	League			Cup		Continental		Other		Total	
Club	Season	Division	Apps	Goals	Apps	Goals	Apps	Goals	Apps	Goals	Apps	Goals
Beijing Guoan	2024	Chinese Super League	1	0	0	0	–		–		1	0
Beijing Guoan	2025	Chinese Super League	17	0	2	0	4 (Note: Appearances in AFC Champions League Two)	0	–		23	0
Beijing Guoan	Total		18	0	2	0	4	0	0	0	24	0
Career total			18	0	2	0	4	0	0	0	24	0

== Honours ==
Beijing Guoan

- Chinese FA Cup: 2025
- Chinese FA Super Cup: 2026
