= Arturo Cheng =

Paraguayan footballer (born 1999)

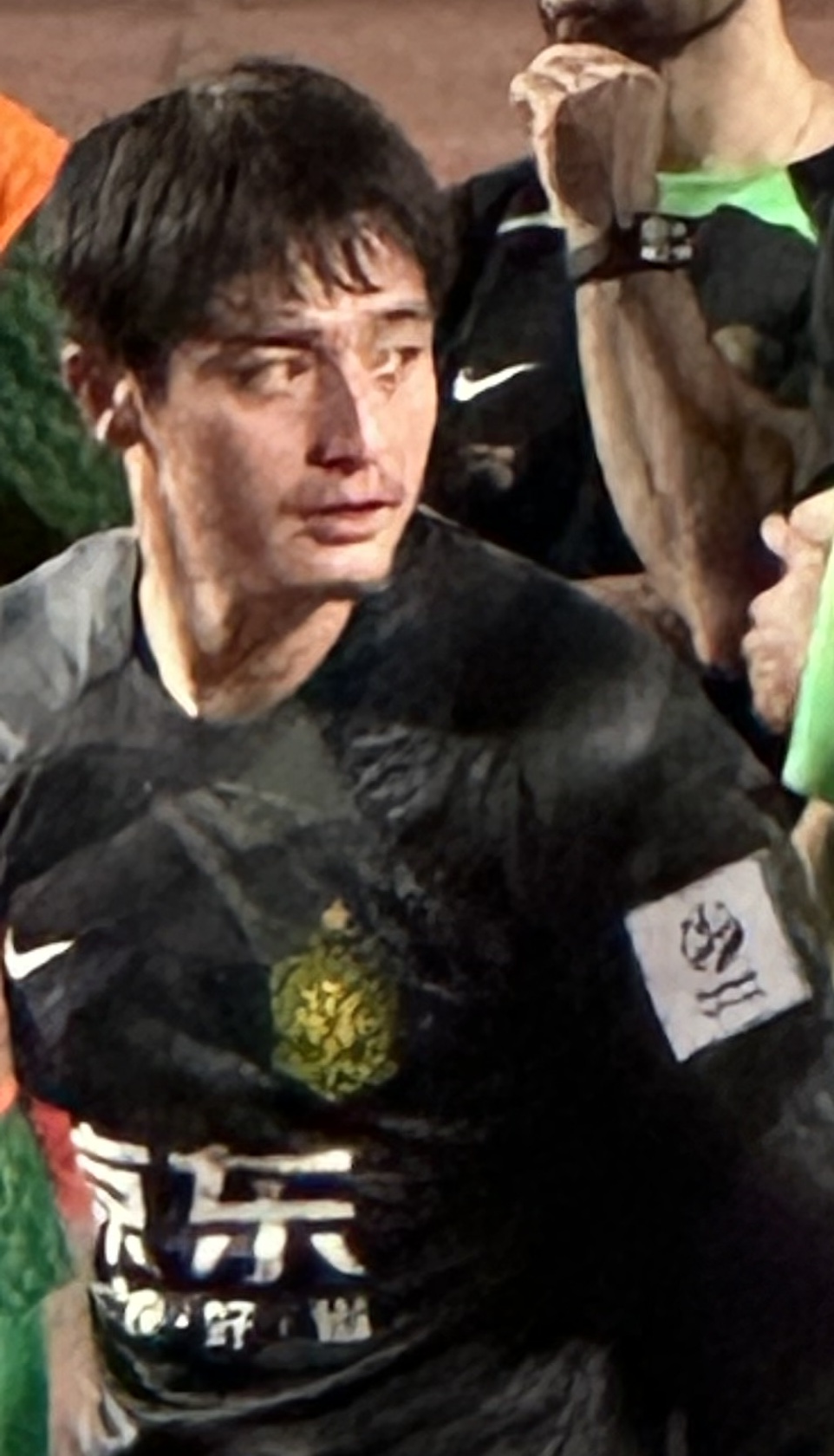
- Cheng in July 2024

Personal information
- Full name: Arturo Daniel Cheng González
- Date of birth: 3 March 1999 (age 27)
- Place of birth: Presidente Franco, Paraguay
- Height: 1.85 m (6 ft 1 in)
- Position: Goalkeeper

Team information
- Current team: Beijing Guoan

Youth career
- –2018: Cerro Porteño

Senior career*
Years	Team	Apps	(Gls)
2019	Cerro Porteño	0	(0)
2022–2024	Racing Rioja	39	(0)
2024–	Beijing Guoan	0	(0)
- * Club domestic league appearances and goals as of 19 October 2024

Arturo Cheng
- Chinese: 郑图罗
Transcriptions
Standard Mandarin
- Hanyu Pinyin: Zhèng Túluó

Arturo Daniel Cheng González (born 3 March 1999), known as Zheng Tuluo (Chinese: 郑图罗; pinyin: Zhèng Túluó) is a Paraguayan-Chinese professional footballer who plays as a goalkeeper for Beijing Guoan.

Born in Paraguay, Cheng obtained Chinese citizenship in 2021 through naturalization and could represent China internationally.

== Early life ==
Cheng was born on 3 March 1999 in Presidente Franco, Paraguay. Born to a Chinese father and a Paraguayan mother, he has a sibling. At the age of five, he started football before moving to Brazil for football purposes at the age of ten.

== Club career ==
As a youth player, Cheng joined the youth academy of Paraguayan side Cerro Porteño. In 2022, he signed for Spanish side Racing Rioja, where he made thirty-nine league appearances. In 2024, he signed for Chinese side Beijing Guoan.

== Style of play ==
Cheng plays as a goalkeeper and is right-footed. NetEase wrote in 2024 that he is a "technical goalkeeper who not only has excellent shot-saving ability, but can also organise attacks from the back... his style is similar to that of German goalkeeper Neuer."

== Honours ==
Beijing Guoan

- Chinese FA Cup: 2025

== See also ==
- List of Chinese naturalized footballers
