= Zhang Jianzhi (footballer) =

Chinese association football player

Personal information
- Date of birth: 28 January 2000 (age 26)
- Place of birth: Shenyang, Liaoning, China
- Height: 1.97 m (6 ft 6 in)
- Position: Goalkeeper

Team information
- Current team: Guangxi Hengchen (on loan from Beijing Guoan)
- Number: 39

Youth career
- –2020: Guangzhou Evergrande

Senior career*
Years	Team	Apps	(Gls)
2021–2023	Guangzhou FC	18	(0)
2024	Yunnan Yukun	0	(0)
2025	Nanjing City	11	(0)
2025–	Beijing Guoan	3	(0)
2026–	→ Guangxi Hengchen (loan)	0	(0)
- * Club domestic league appearances and goals as of 18 July 2025

Zhang Jianzhi (Chinese: 张健智; pinyin: Zhāng Jiànzhì; born 28 January 2000) is a Chinese professional footballer who plays as a goalkeeper for China League One club Guangxi Hengchen, on loan from Chinese Super League club Beijing Guoan.

== Career ==
On 21 February 2024, it was announced that Zhang Jianzhi moved to China League One newcomers Yunnan Yukun.

On 27 February 2025, Zhang moved to China League One side Nanjing City on a free transfer.

On 18 July 2025, Zhang joined Chinese Super League club Beijing Guoan for an undisclosed fee, and was given the number 39 shirt. He made his Beijing Guoan debut on 23 October 2025 in an AFC Champions League Two clash away at Tai Po in Hong Kong, which ended in a 3–3 draw.

On 15 July 2026, Zhang was loaned out to China League One club Guangxi Hengchen for the rest of 2026 season.

== Career statistics ==
As of 23 October 2025.

Club	Season	League			Cup		Continental		Other		Total	
Club	Season	Division	Apps	Goals	Apps	Goals	Apps	Goals	Apps	Goals	Apps	Goals
Guangzhou	2021	Chinese Super League	0	0	1	0	6 (Note: Appearances in the AFC Champions League)	0	–		7	0
Guangzhou	2022	Chinese Super League	10	0	0	0	0	0	–		10	0
Guangzhou	2023	China League One	8	0	1	0	–		–		9	0
Guangzhou	Total		18	0	2	0	6	0	0	0	26	0
Yunnan Yukun	2024	China League One	0	0	1	0	–		–		1	0
Nanjing City	2025	China League One	11	0	0	0	–		–		11	0
Beijing Guoan	2025	Chinese Super League	0	0	0	0	1 (Note: Appearances in the AFC Champions League Two)	0	–		1	0
Career total			29	0	3	0	7	0	0	0	39	0

== Honours ==
Yunnan Yukun

- China League One: 2024

Beijing Guoan

- Chinese FA Cup: 2025
- Chinese FA Super Cup: 2026
