= Lü Zhuoyi =

Chinese footballer (born 2001)

Lü Zhuoyi 吕焯毅
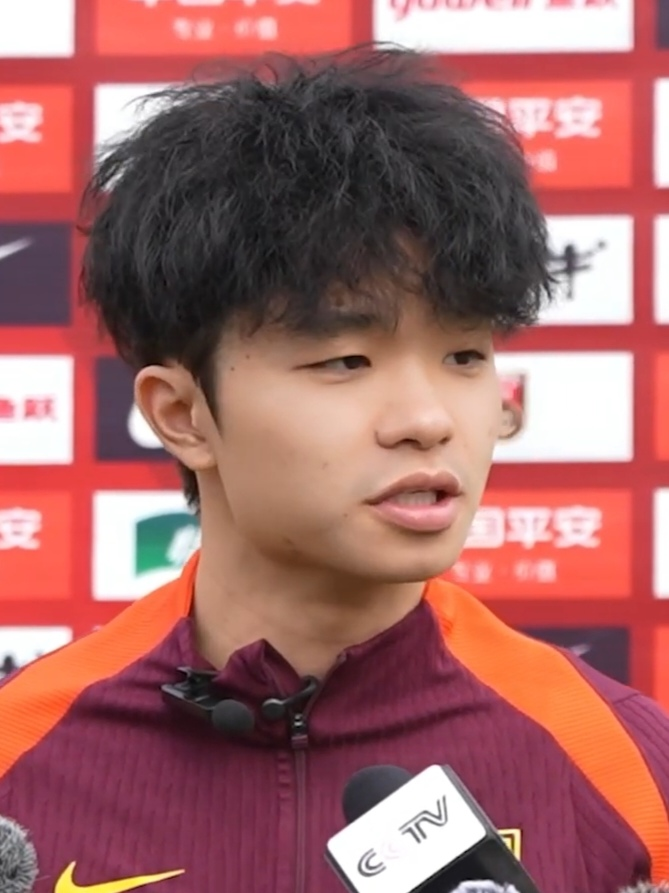
- Lü in 2026

Personal information
- Full name: Lü Zhuoyi
- Date of birth: 16 April 2001 (age 25)
- Place of birth: Guangzhou, Guangdong, China
- Height: 1.78 m (5 ft 10 in)
- Positions: Midfielder; full-back

Team information
- Current team: Dalian Yingbo
- Number: 38

Youth career
- 2013–2020: Beijing Wanda
- 2014–?: Atlético Madrid
- 2020–2021: Dalian Pro

Senior career*
Years	Team	Apps	(Gls)
2022–2023	Dalian Pro	19	(0)
2024–	Dalian Yingbo	85	(8)
- * Club domestic league appearances and goals as of 19 November 2026

Lü Zhuoyi (Chinese: 吕焯毅; Chinese: 呂焯毅; pinyin: Lǚ Zhuóyì; born 16 April 2001) is a Chinese footballer who plays as midfielder or full-back for Dalian Yingbo.

== Club career ==
Lü was selected by Beijing Wanda youth program in 2014, and received training session at Atletico Madrid. In 2020, he joined Dalian Pro youth team, and was promoted to the first team in the 2022 season. He made his first appearance on 10 July 2022 in a league game against Shandong Taishan in a 3-1 defeat where he came on as a substitute for Lin Liangming. He would make his first starting lineup in the following league game on 6 August 2022 against Shanghai Port in a 1-1 draw.

== Career statistics ==
As of match played 19 November 2026.

Appearances and goals by club, season and competition
Club	Season	League			National Cup		Continental		Other		Total	
Club	Season	Division	Apps	Goals	Apps	Goals	Apps	Goals	Apps	Goals	Apps	Goals
Dalian Pro	2022	Chinese Super League	14	0	0	0	–		–		14	0
Dalian Pro	2023	Chinese Super League	5	0	3	0	–		–		8	0
Dalian Pro	Total		19	0	3	0	0	0	0	0	22	0
Dalian Yingbo	2024	China League One	27	4	1	0	–		–		28	4
Dalian Yingbo	2025	Chinese Super League	29	2	2	0	–		–		31	2
Dalian Yingbo	2026	Chinese Super League	29	2	4	0	–		–		33	2
Dalian Yingbo	Total		85	8	7	0	0	0	0	0	92	5
Career total			104	8	10	0	0	0	0	0	114	8

== Honours ==
Dalian Yingbo

- Chinese Super League: 2026
