= 2025 Chinese FA Cup final =

Association football match in 2025

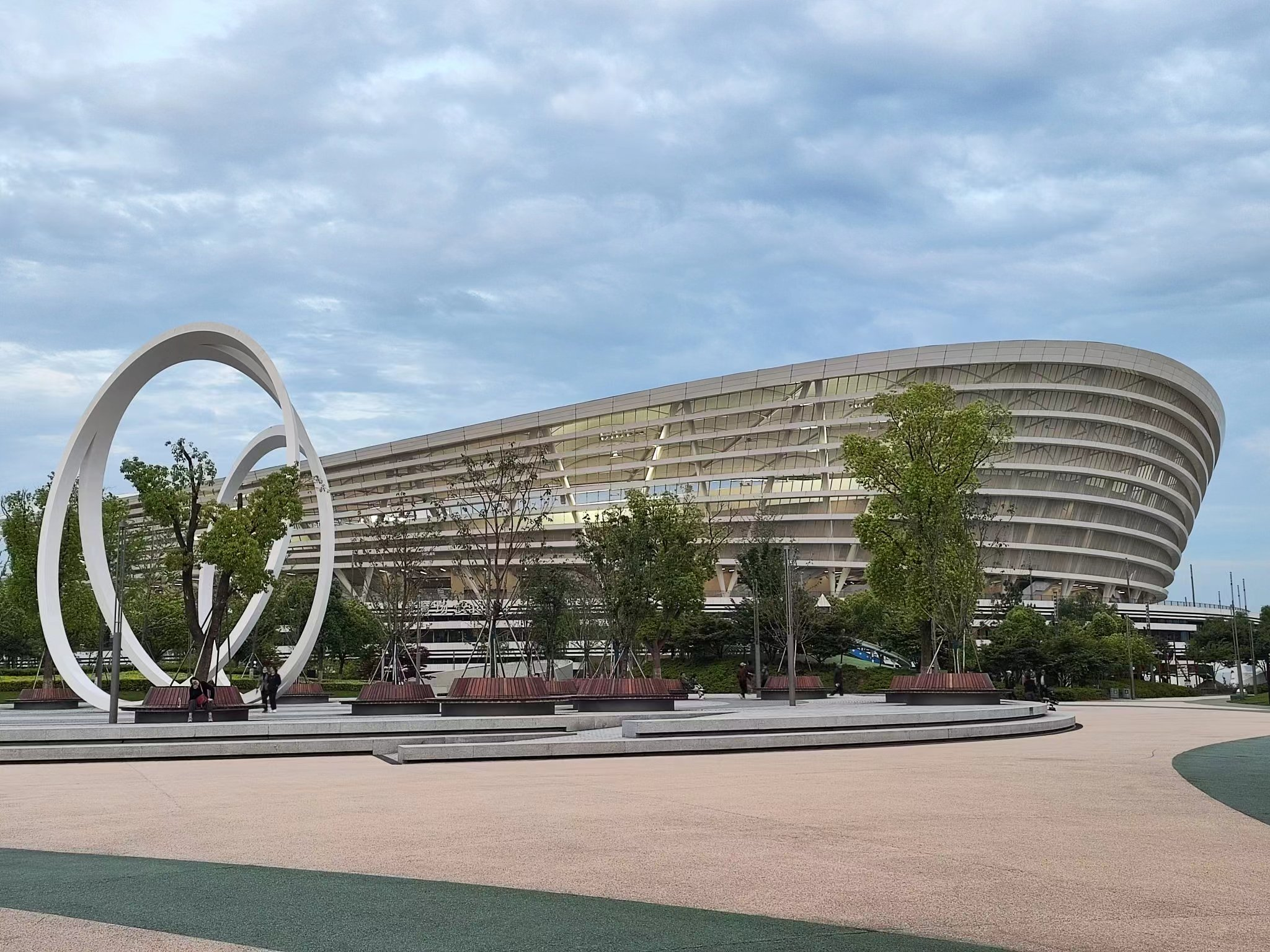
- The match took place at the Suzhou Olympic Sports Centre
- Event: 2025 Chinese FA Cup
Beijing Guoan	Henan
3	0
- Date: 6 December 2025
- Venue: Suzhou Olympic Sports Centre, Suzhou
- Referee: Ko Hyung-jin (South Korea)
- Attendance: 40,558

The 2025 Chinese FA Cup final was a football match to determine the winners of the 2025 Chinese FA Cup, the 27th edition of the national football cup of China, the Chinese FA Cup. The match took place on Saturday 6 December 2025 at the Suzhou Olympic Sports Centre in Suzhou, between Beijing Guoan and Henan.

Beijing Guoan, the winners of this match, qualified for the preliminary round of the 2026–27 AFC Champions League Elite, as well as the 2026 Chinese FA Super Cup.

== Venue ==
On 30 September 2024, it was announced that the match would be played at the Suzhou Olympic Sports Centre in Suzhou, Jiangsu.

== Route to the final ==
Beijing Guoan		Round	Henan	
Opponent	Result	Round	Opponent	Result
Shijiazhuang Gongfu	5–0 (A)	Third round	Chongqing Tonglianglong	2–1 (A)
Dalian Yingbo	1–1 (a.e.t.) (6–5 p) (A)	Fourth round	Zhejiang	3–2 (H)
Qingdao West Coast	2–2 (a.e.t.) (4–2 p) (A)	Quarter-finals	Shanghai Shenhua	3–3 (a.e.t.) (8–7 p) (A)
Yunnan Yukun	7–0 (H)	Semi-finals	Chengdu Rongcheng	0–0 (a.e.t.) (4–3 p) (A)
Note: In all results above, the score of the finalist is given first (H: home; A: away).

=== Beijing Guoan ===
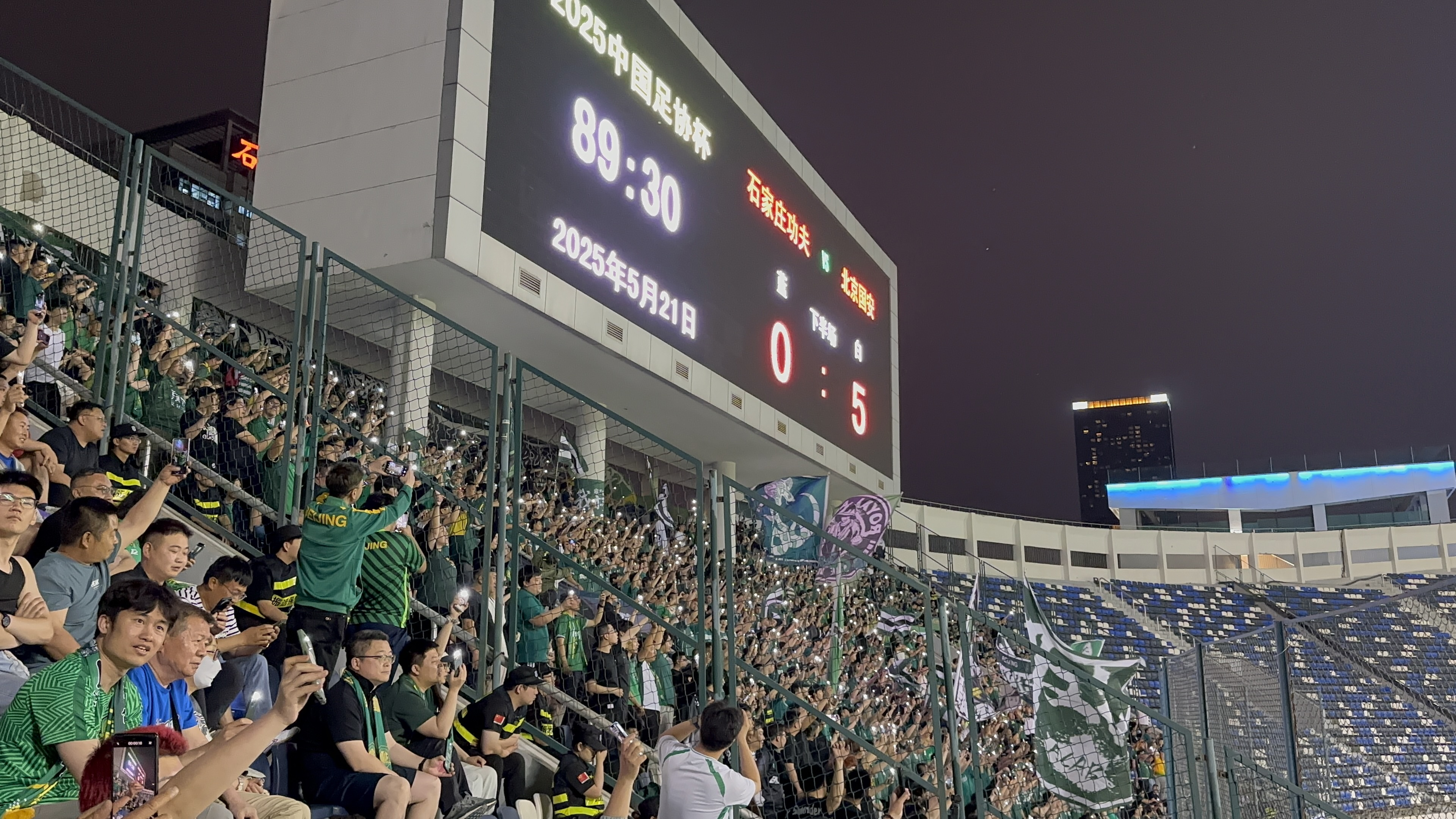
Beijing Guoan away supporters in the third round against Shijiazhuang Gongfu

On 21 May, Beijing Guoan visited China League One side Shijiazhuang Gongfu to begin their tournament. With two goals from Wang Ziming, and a goal each from Dawhan, Zhang Yuan, and a goal from captain Zhang Xizhe on his 400th Guoan appearance, the match finished as a 5–0 victory for Beijing Guoan. On 21 June, Guoan faced fellow Chinese Super League side Dalian Yingbo away from home in the fourth round. Cephas Malele's penalty gave a 1–0 lead to Dalian Yingbo, and Zhang Yuning equalised in the 90th minute. After a goalless extra time, Liu Yi's penalty in the shoot-out was saved by Hou Sen, who carried Guoan through to the quarter-finals.

Beijing Guoan faced Qingdao West Coast away in their quarter-final on 22 July. After a goal for Beijing Guoan from Wang Ziming and a goal for Qingdao West Coast from Abdul-Aziz Yakubu, the match entered extra-time. Cao Yongjing scored first for Beijing Guoan in the 117th minute, before Davidson equalised for Qingdao West Coast in the 119th minute. Dawhan scored the winning penalty to send Guoan into the semi-finals.

On 20 August, Beijing Guoan hosted Yunnan Yukun in what would be a 7–0 victory. After Fábio Abreu's goal in the 26th minute, Yunnan Yukun's Andrei Burcă was sent off with a direct red card for violent conduct. Wang Gang and Guga then scored a goal each to take Guoan 3–0 up by half-time. After Lin Liangming, Jiang Wenhao, Zhang Xizhe, and Zhang Yuning's goals sealed the victory for Beijing Guoan in the second half, the match marked the end of the club's seven-year absence from the Chinese FA Cup final since 2018.

On 5 October, Beijing Guoan announced the resignation of its manager, Quique Setién, after a run of league performances below expectation. Two days later, Setién's assistant manager, Ramiro Amarelle, was named Guoan's interim manager.

=== Henan ===
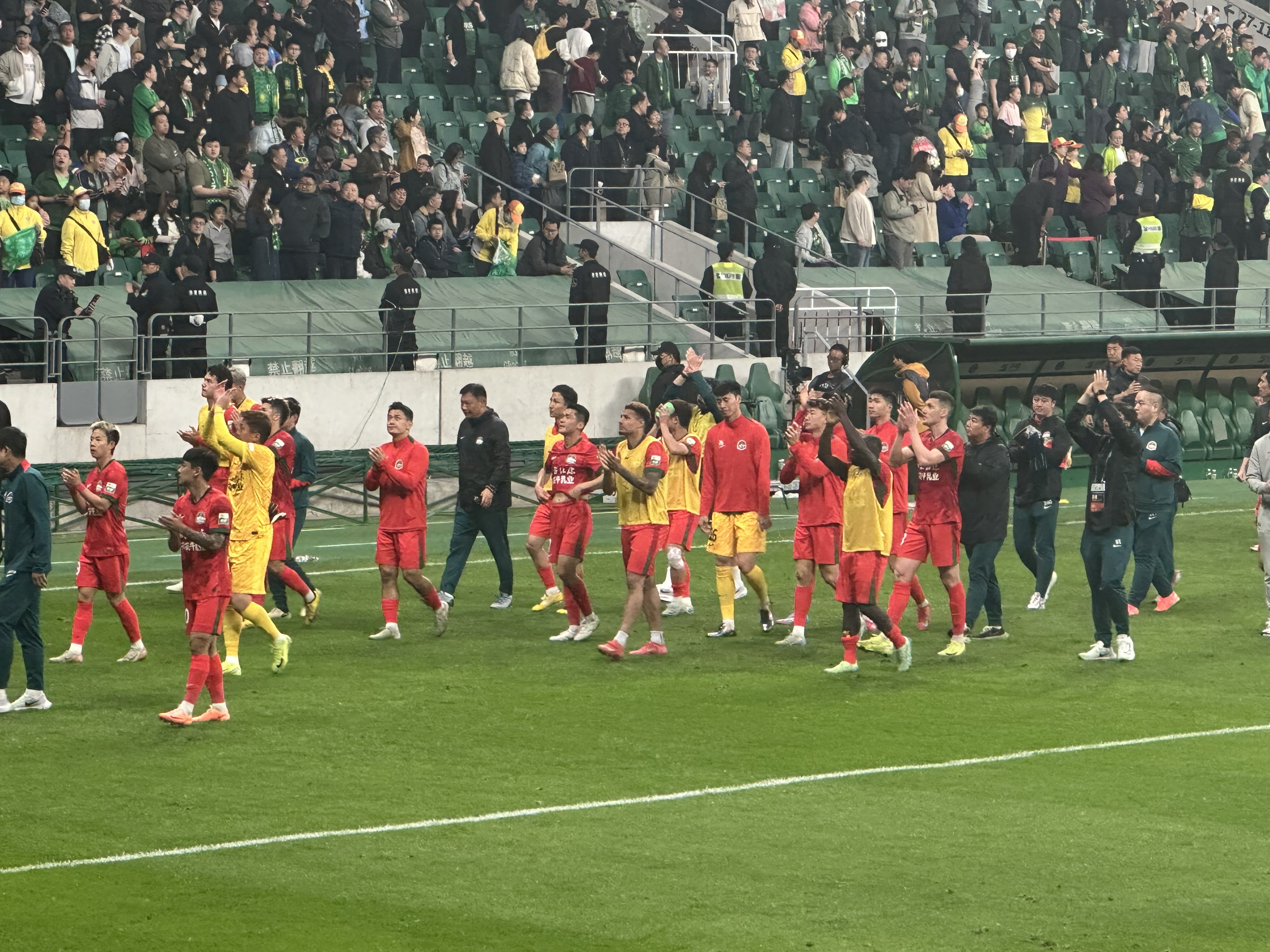
Henan players after defeat in the season's first meeting with Beijing Guoan

On 25 April, Henan suffered a narrow 1–0 league defeat to Beijing Guoan, with Fang Hao being the difference-maker. Four days after this very match, it was announced that Henan's manager, Nam Ki-il, was sacked. Replacing him was Daniel Ramos, who was most recently in charge of AVS in Portugal.

On 21 May, Henan entered the competition in an away tie with a 2–1 victory against China League One opponent Chongqing Tonglianglong in the third round, with goals from Felippe Cardoso and Li Xingxian for Henan, and a goal from Wu Yongqiang for Chongqing Tonglianglong. In the fourth round, Henan beat Chinese Super League side Zhejiang on 22 June with a 3–2 home victory. Zhong Yihao, Wang Shangyuan, and Felippe Cardoso scored for Henan, while Franko Andrijašević and Liu Haofan entered the score sheet for Zhejiang.

In the quarter-final, Henan travelled away to play Shanghai Shenhua on 23 July. Luis Asué gave Shenhua the lead, only to be equalised by Felippe Cardoso five minutes later. Henan's Frank Acheampong fired Henan into the lead, and Shenhua equalised in the 83rd minute with Wilson Manafá. Felippe Cardoso scored again in extra-time, however, his goal was nullified by a Shenhua goal from Liu Chengyu. After a thrilling 3–3 draw, the match went to a penalty shoot-out, and Henan were victorious after Xu Jiamin saved Liu Chengyu's penalty in the tenth round of penalty kicks.

On 19 August, Henan faced Chengdu Rongcheng away in the semi-final. After a 0–0 draw in regular time as well as extra time, the match boiled down to a penalty shoot-out once more. With Henan goalkeeper Wang Guoming saving Timo Letschert's penalty in the fifth round, Henan became Chinese FA Cup finalists for the first time in the club's 31-year history.

== Match ==
=== Details ===
6 December 2025
19:00 CST

Beijing Guoan	3–0	Henan
Abreu 16', 45+7' (pen.), 90+2' (pen.)

Suzhou Olympic Sports Centre, Suzhou
Attendance: 40,558
Referee: Ko Hyung-jin (South Korea)

Beijing Guoan	Henan

GK	34	(China) Hou Sen
RB	27	(China) Wang Gang		(substituted off) 43'
CB	5	(Cameroon) Michael Ngadeu-Ngadjui	(yellow card) 45+1'
CB	2	(China) Wu Shaocong	(yellow card) 61'
LB	4	(China) Li Lei
RM	37	(China) Cao Yongjing	(yellow card) 33'	(substituted off) 77'
CM	23	(Brazil) Dawhan	(yellow card) 57'
CM	8	(Portugal) Guga
LM	11	(China) Lin Liangming		(substituted off) 90+4'
CF	9	(China) Zhang Yuning		(substituted off) 90+5'
CF	29	(Angola) Fábio Abreu
Substitutes:
GK	39	(China) Zhang Jianzhi
DF	3	(China) He Yupeng		(substituted on) 43'
DF	19	(China) Nebijan Muhmet
DF	26	(China) Bai Yang		(substituted on) 90+5'
DF	35	(China) Jiang Wenhao
MF	6	(China) Chi Zhongguo
MF	7	(China) Serginho		(substituted on) 77'
MF	10	(China) Zhang Xizhe
MF	21	(China) Zhang Yuan
FW	17	(China) Yang Liyu		(substituted on) 90+4'
FW	18	(China) Fang Hao
FW	20	(China) Wang Ziming
Manager:
(Spain) Ramiro Amarelle

GK	18	(China) Wang Guoming
RB	4	(China) Yeljan Shinar
CB	36	(Brazil) Iago Maidana
CB	23	(Brazil) Lucas Maia
LB	22	(China) Huang Ruifeng
CM	38	(China) Lu Yongtao	(yellow card) 20'	(substituted off) 46'
CM	6	(China) Wang Shangyuan
RW	7	(China) Zhong Yihao	(yellow card) 70'
AM	40	(Brazil) Bruno Nazário
LW	11	(Ghana) Frank Acheampong		(substituted off) 77'
CF	9	(Brazil) Felippe Cardoso
Substitutes:
GK	33	(China) Shi Chenglong
DF	2	(China) Liu Yixin
DF	3	(Hong Kong) Oliver Gerbig
DF	15	(China) Liu Bin
DF	16	(China) Yang Kuo
DF	27	(China) Niu Ziyi
MF	8	(China) Yin Hongbo
MF	13	(China) Abdurasul Abudulam		(substituted on) 46'
MF	19	(China) Yang Yilin		(substituted on) 77'
MF	20	(China) He Chao
FW	10	(China) Huang Zichang
FW	30	(China) Liu Xinyu
Manager:
(Portugal) Daniel Ramos

Assistant referees:
Shi Xiang
Ma Ji
Fourth official:
Wang Di
Video assistant referee:
Bastian Dankert (Germany)
Assistant video assistant referees:
Zhang Lei
