= Longhaidonglu station =

Metro station in Zhengzhou, China

Longhaidonglu 陇海东路
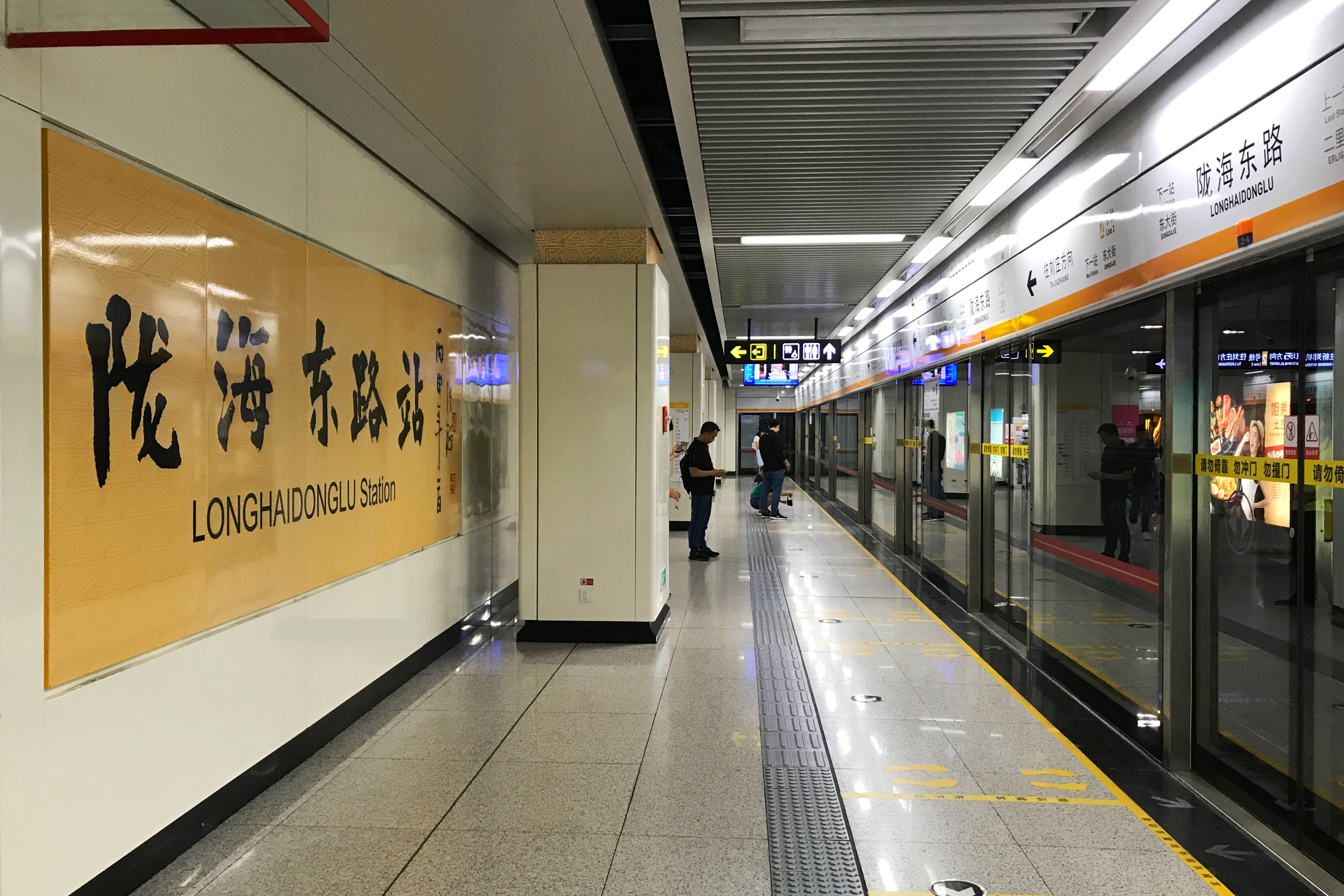

General information
- Location: Zijingshan Road × Longhai East Road; Guancheng, Zhengzhou; China
- Coordinates: 34.7394°N 113.6760°E
- System: Zhengzhou Metro rapid transit station
- Operator: Zhengzhou Metro
- Line: Line 2
- Platforms: 2 (1 island platform)
- Connections: Bus; Zhengzhou BRT

Construction
- Structure type: Underground

Other information
- Station code: 230

History
- Opened: 19 August 2016

Services
Preceding station	Zhengzhou Metro	Following station
Dongdajie towards Jiahe	Line 2	Erligang towards Zhengzhou Hangkonggang Railway Station
Location
- Location within Zhengzhou

Longhaidonglu (Chinese: 陇海东路) is a metro station of Zhengzhou Metro Line 2.

== Station layout ==
G	-	Exits
-2F	Concourse	Customer service, Vending machines
-3F; Platforms	Platform 2	← Line 2 towards Jiahe (Dongdajie)
-3F; Platforms	Island platform, doors will open on the left
-3F; Platforms	Platform 1	Line 2 towards Nansihuan (Erligang) →

== Exits ==
Exit	Destination
Exit A	Longhai East Road (south side), Zijingshan Road (east side)
Exit D	Nancang Street (north side), Zijingshan Road (east side)
