= Erligang station =

Metro station in Zhengzhou, China

Erligang 二里岗
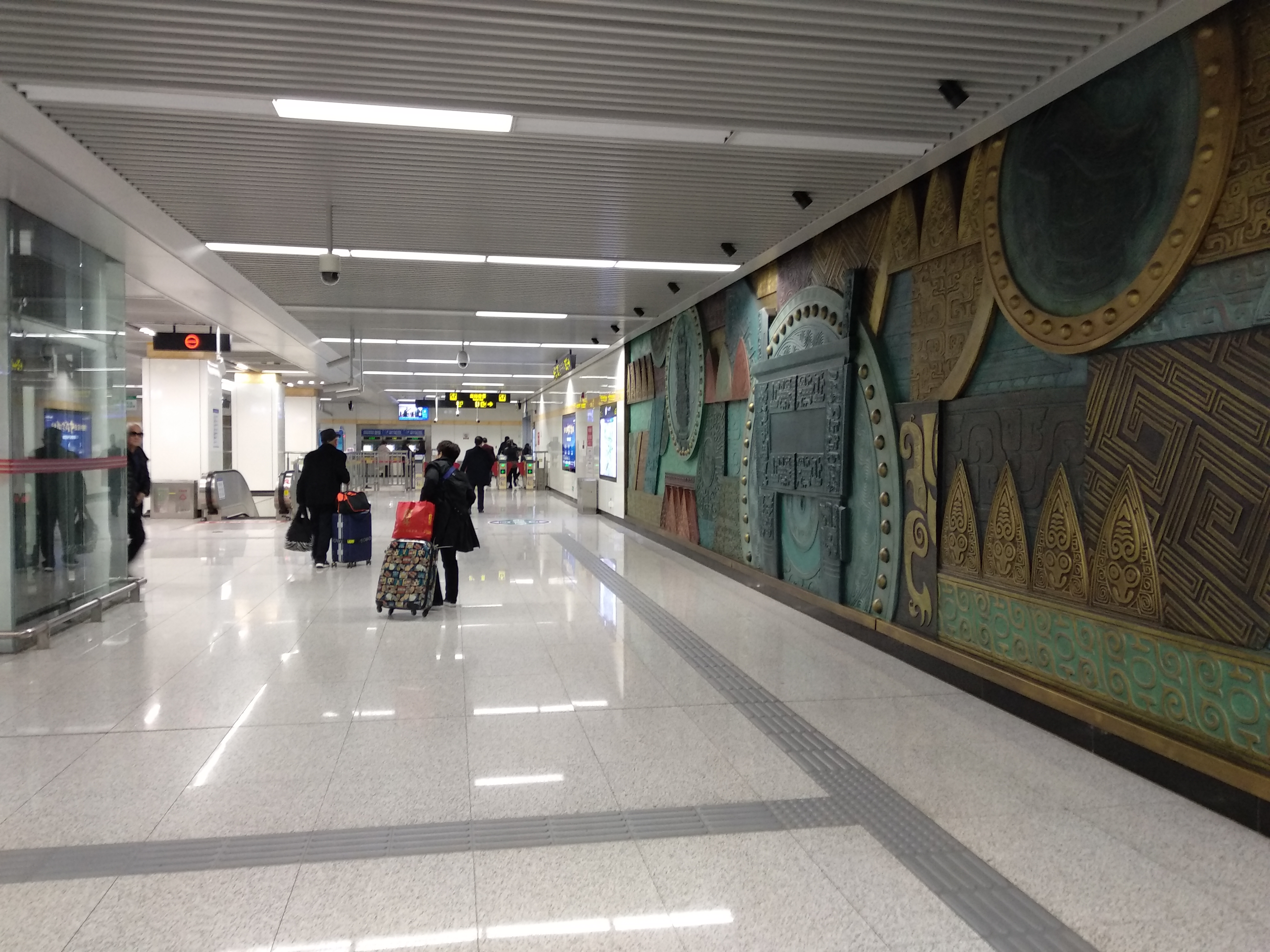
- Line 2 concourse

General information
- Location: Zijingshan Road × Erligang South Road; Guancheng, Zhengzhou; China
- Coordinates: 34.7301°N 113.6759°E
- System: Zhengzhou Metro rapid transit station
- Operator: Zhengzhou Metro
- Lines: Line 2; Line 6
- Platforms: 2 (1 island platform)
- Connections: Bus

Construction
- Structure type: Underground

Other information
- Station code: 231

History
- Opened: 19 August 2016

Services
Preceding station	Zhengzhou Metro	Following station
Longhaidonglu towards Jiahe	Line 2	Nanwulibao towards Zhengzhou Hangkonggang Railway Station
Longxiu Gongyuan towards Jiayu	Line 6	Erligang Dong towards Qinghua Fuzhong
Location
- Location within Zhengzhou

Erligang (Chinese: 二里岗) is a metro station of Zhengzhou Metro Line 2 and Line 6.

== Station layout ==
The 2-level underground station has a single island platform. The station concourse is on the B1 level and the B2 level is for the platforms.

G	-	Exits
B1	Concourse	Customer service, Vending machines
B2; Platforms	Platform 2	← Line 2 towards Jiahe (Longhaidonglu)
B2; Platforms	Island platform, doors will open on the left
B2; Platforms	Platform 1	Line 2 towards Nansihuan (Nanwulibao) →

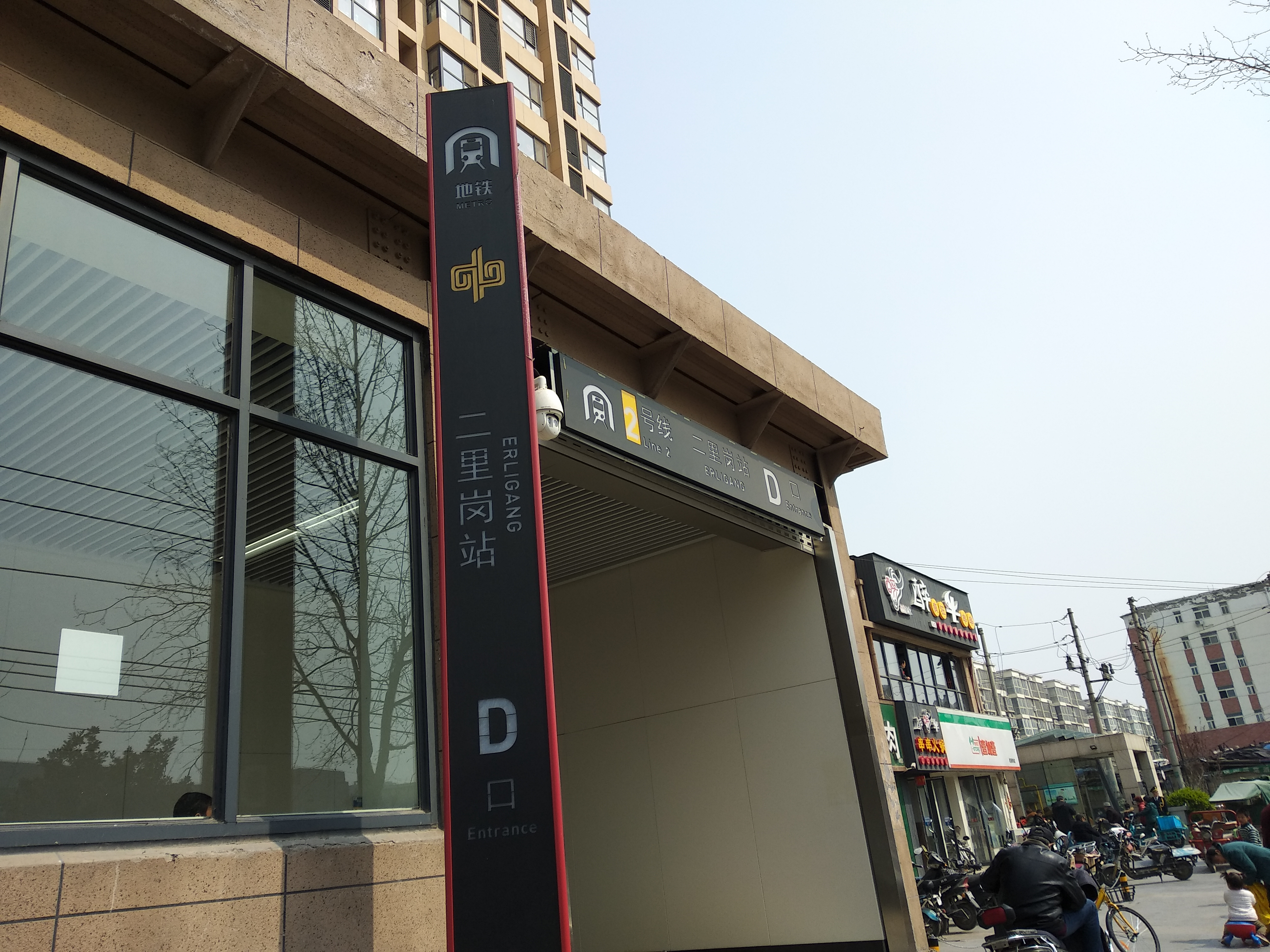
Exit D of the station

== Exits ==
Exit	Destination
Exit B	
Exit D	
