= Dong Dajie station =

Metro station in Zhengzhou, China

Dong Dajie 东大街
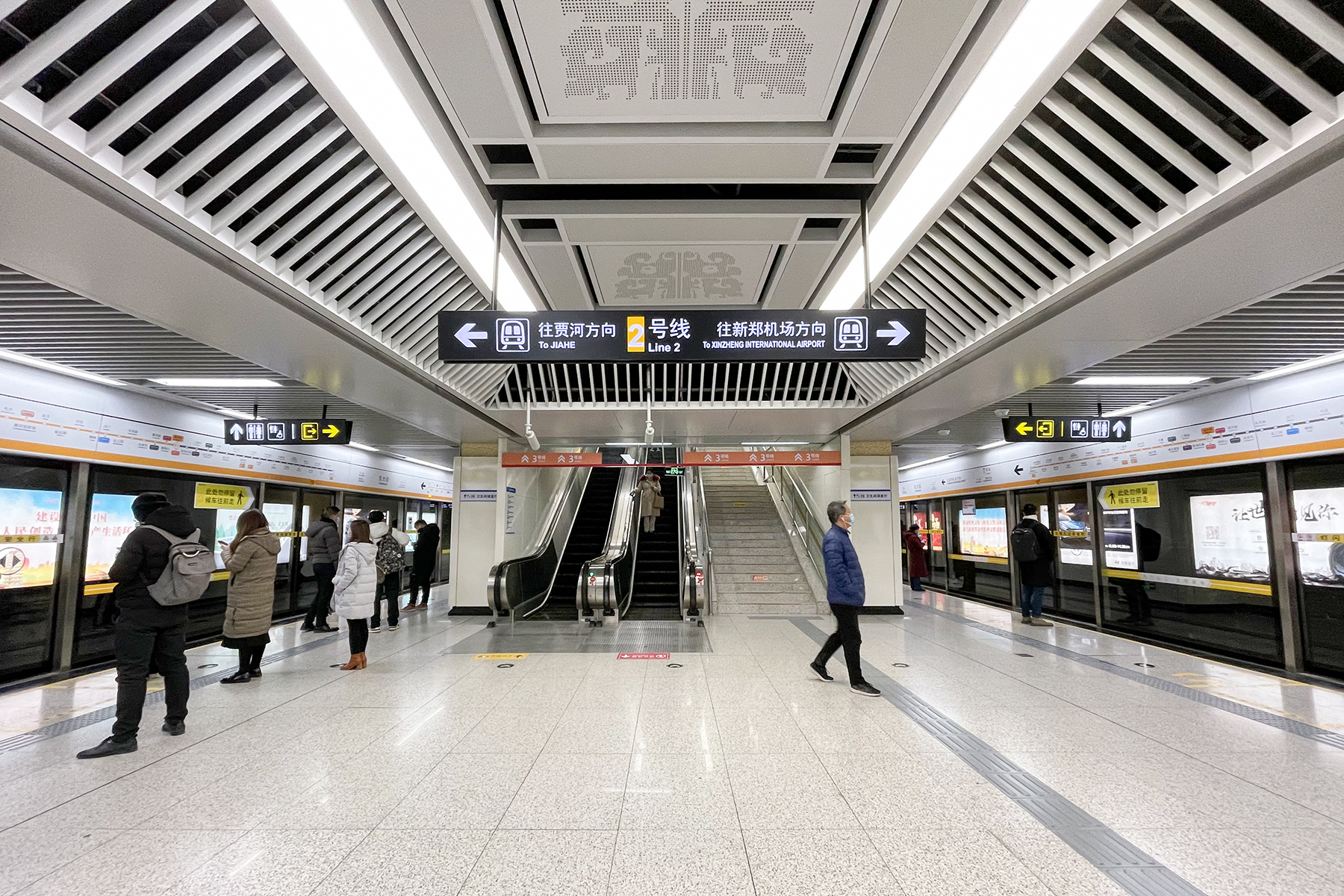
- Platforms of Line 2

General information
- Location: Zijingshan Road × Dong Dajie; Guancheng, Zhengzhou; China
- Coordinates: 34.7489°N 113.6759°E
- System: Zhengzhou Metro rapid transit station
- Operator: Zhengzhou Metro
- Lines: Line 2; Line 3
- Platforms: 4 (2 island platforms)
- Connections: Bus

Construction
- Structure type: Underground

Other information
- Station code: 229

History
- Opened: 19 August 2016

Services
Preceding station	Zhengzhou Metro	Following station
Zijingshan towards Jiahe	Line 2	Longhaidonglu towards Zhengzhou Hangkonggang Railway Station
Xidajie towards Henan Sports Center	Line 3	Zhengzhouwenmiao towards Binhe Xincheng Nan
Location
- Location within Zhengzhou

Dong Dajie (Chinese: 东大街) is a metro station of Zhengzhou Metro Line 2 and Line 3.

This station became an interchange station between Line 2 and Line 3 after Line 3 started operation in 2020.

== Station layout ==
G	-	Exits
B1	Concourse	Customer service, Vending machines
B3; Platforms	Platform 2	← Line 2 towards Jiahe (Zijingshan)
B3; Platforms	Island platform, doors will open on the left
B3; Platforms	Platform 1	Line 2 towards Nansihuan (Longhaidonglu) →

== Exits ==
Exit	Destination
Exit A	Shuyuan Street (north side), Zijingshan Road (east side)
Exit E	Dong Dajie (south side), Zijingshan Road (east side)
