= Liu Yixin =

Chinese footballer (born 2001)

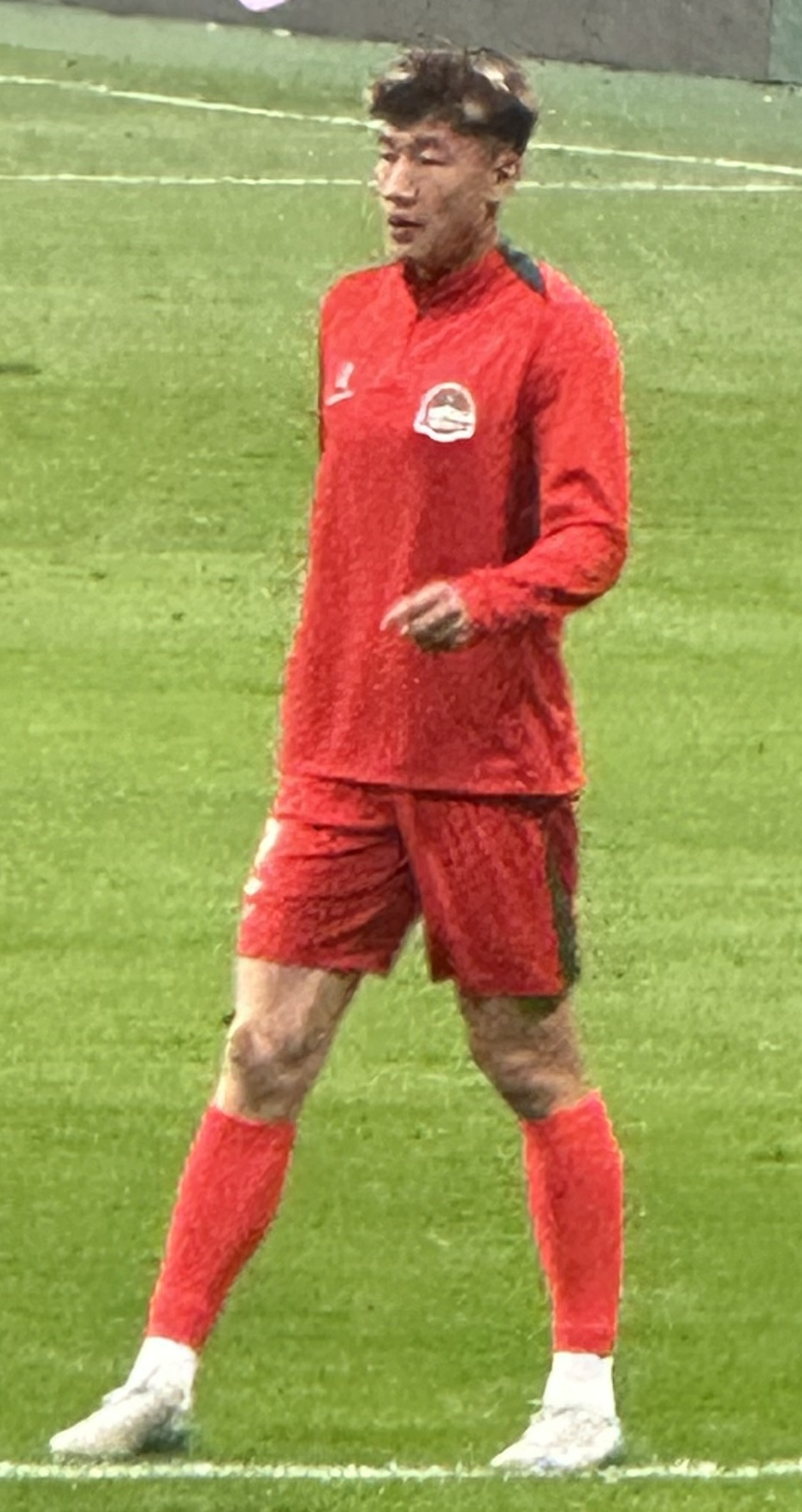
- Liu Yixin in April 2025

Personal information
- Full name: Liu Yixin
- Date of birth: 27 May 2001 (age 25)
- Place of birth: Zhengzhou, Henan, China
- Height: 1.83 m (6 ft 0 in)
- Position: Left-back

Team information
- Current team: Henan FC
- Number: 27

Youth career
- –2019: Guangzhou Evergrande Taobao
- 2019–2022: Chongqing Liangjiang Athletic

Senior career*
Years	Team	Apps	(Gls)
2022	Chongqing Liangjiang Athletic	0	(0)
2022–	Henan FC	85	(0)
- * Club domestic league appearances and goals as of 22 November 2026

Liu Yixin (simplified Chinese: 刘易鑫; traditional Chinese: 劉易鑫; pinyin: Liú Yìxīn; born 27 May 2001) is a Chinese professional footballer who plays as a left-back for Chinese Super League club Henan FC.

== Career ==
=== Early career ===
Born in Zhengzhou, Henan, Liu Yixin joined the Evergrande Football School of Chinese Super League club Guangzhou Evergrande in 2014. He was immediately sent to train in Spain for three years before returning to China in 2017. In 2019, he joined the youth academy of fellow Chinese Super League side Chongqing Dangdai Lifan. On 30 April 2022, Liu Yixin was promoted to the Chongqing Liangjiang Athletic first-team, fielding the number 27 shirt. However, on 24 May 2022, it was announced that Chongqing Liangjiang Athletic had ceased operations, and Liu subsequently became a free agent.

=== Henan ===
On 27 May 2022, it was announced that Liu Yixin has signed for his hometown club and Chinese Super League side Henan Songshan Longmen. He chose to wear the number 2 shirt. He made his debut for the club on 11 June 2022, coming on as a 62nd-minute substitute for Niu Ziyi in a 3–1 win over Zhejiang. His gametime increased in November 2022, after earning his first start for the club on 13 November in a 3–1 victory against eventual league winners Wuhan Three Towns. On 30 December 2022, he provided an assist for Huang Zichang in the second goal in the 62nd minute, in a 4–0 win against Hebei. Liu continued to be a rotational starter for Henan FC in the 2023 and 2024 seasons. After the 2024 Chinese FA Cup match against Guangxi Pingguo Haliao on 17 July, Liu suffered a patella fracture which sidelined him for four weeks. On 21 September 2024, Liu provided an assist for Bruno Nazário in a 2–0 home win over Chengdu Rongcheng. Four weeks later on 18 October, he assisted Nemanja Čović in the match opener of a 2–1 away defeat to Shanghai Shenhua. On 30 June 2025, he assisted Felippe Cardoso in Henan's first goal in a 2–2 home draw with Shandong Taishan.

== Personal life ==
Liu Yixin was admitted to Beijing Sport University in July 2024.

== Career statistics ==
=== Club ===
As of 31 October 2025

Appearances and goals by club, season, and competition
Club	Season	League			Cup		Continental		Other		Total	
Club	Season	Division	Apps	Goals	Apps	Goals	Apps	Goals	Apps	Goals	Apps	Goals
Henan FC	2022	Chinese Super League	15	0	1	0	–		–		16	0
Henan FC	2023	Chinese Super League	16	0	2	0	–		–		18	0
Henan FC	2024	Chinese Super League	17	0	2	0	–		–		19	0
Henan FC	2025	Chinese Super League	21	0	4	0	–		–		25	0
Henan FC	Total		69	0	9	0	0	0	0	0	78	0
Career total			69	0	9	0	0	0	0	0	78	0
