= Beixia Street Subdistrict =

Beixia Street Subdistrict 北下街街道
- Subdistrict
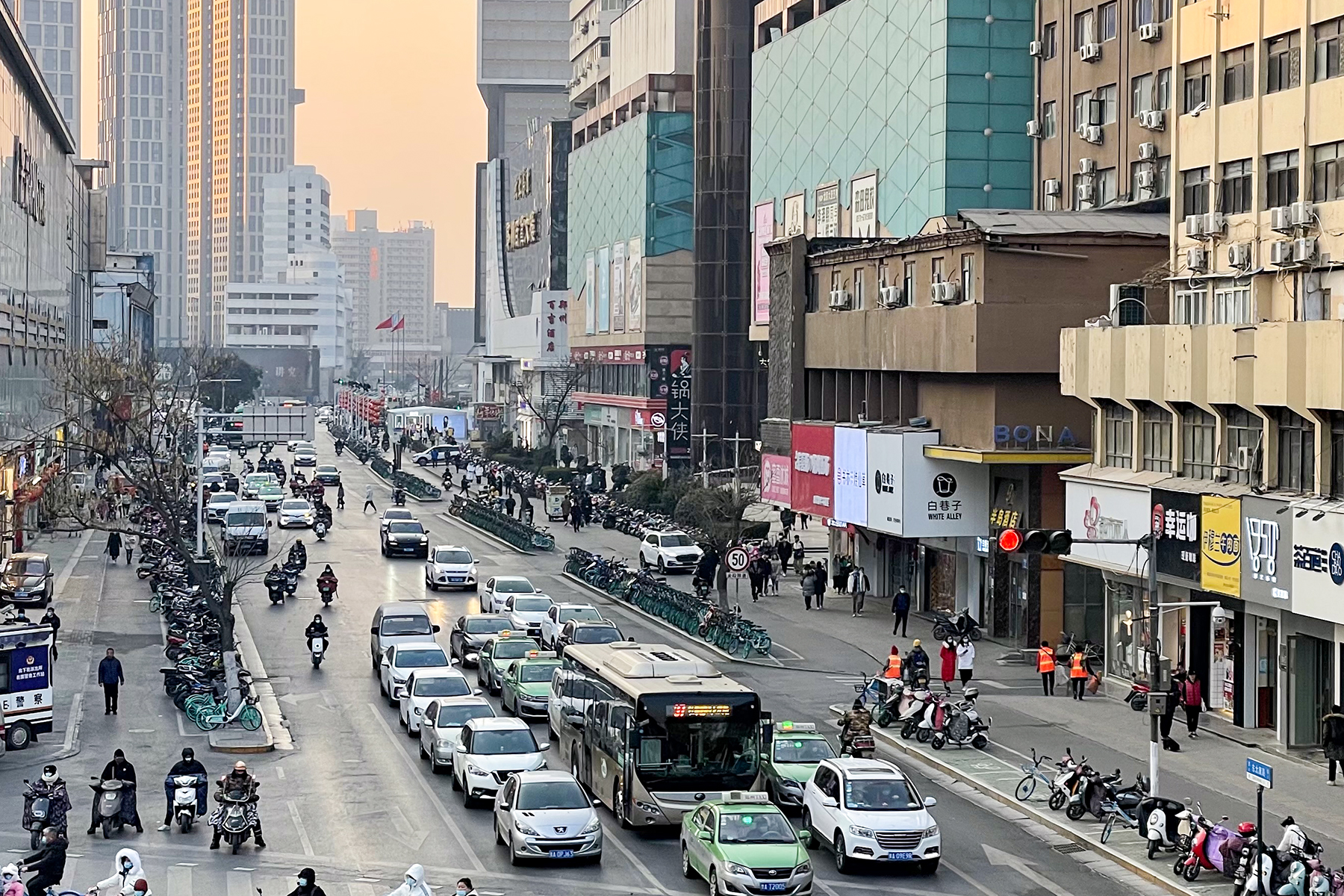
- A view of Taikang Road, in Beixia Street Subdistrict
- Interactive map of Beixia Street Subdistrict
- Country: People's Republic of China
- Province: Henan
- Prefecture-level city: Zhengzhou
- District: Guancheng Hui District

Area
  - Total: 1.2 km^{2} (0.46 sq mi)

Population (2007)
  - Total: 27,461
  - Density: 22,884.17/km^{2} (59,269.7/sq mi)
- Time zone: UTC+8 (China Standard)
- Postal code: 410104001

Beixia Street Subdistrict (Chinese: 北下街街道; pinyin: běixià jiē jiēdào) is a subdistrict within the Guancheng Hui Ethnic District of Zhengzhou, Henan, China. It is home to the administrative offices of the district.

== Administrative divisions ==
The subdistrict is divided into 7 residential communities:

- Shangcheng Road Residential Community (商城路社区)
- Beixia Avenue Residential Community (北下街社区)
- Guancheng Avenue Residential Community (管城街社区)
- Daishu Hutong Residential Community (代书胡同社区)
- Xichang Residential Community (西昌社区)
- Xingyue Residential Community (星月社区)
- Beishuncheng Avenue Residential Community (北顺城街社区)

== Cultural sights ==
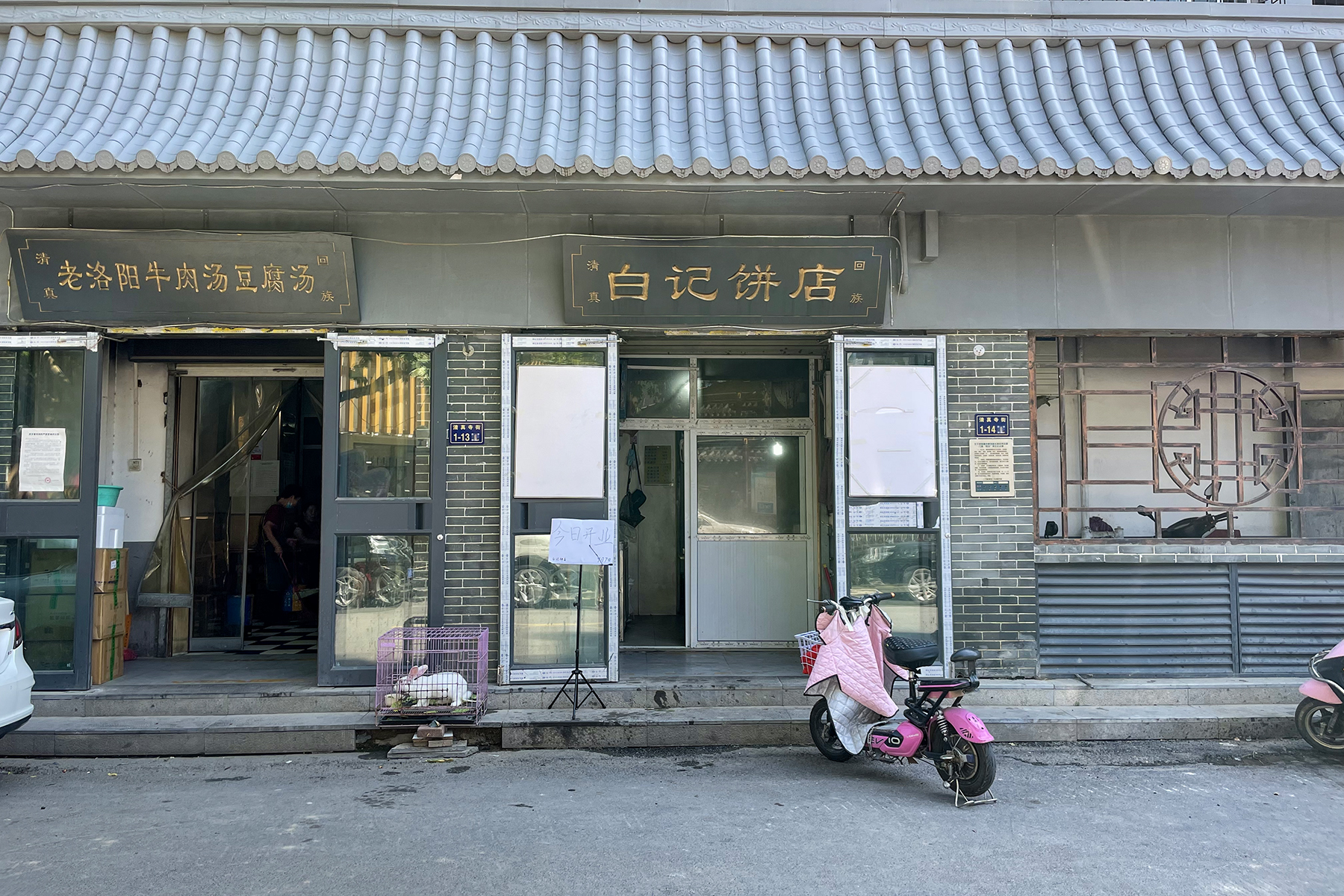
Hui halal restaurants on Mosque Street

The subdistrict is home to the Beidajie Mosque, a cultural center for the area's Hui Muslim population, which possibly dates back to the Ming Dynasty.
