= Niu Ziyi =

Chinese footballer

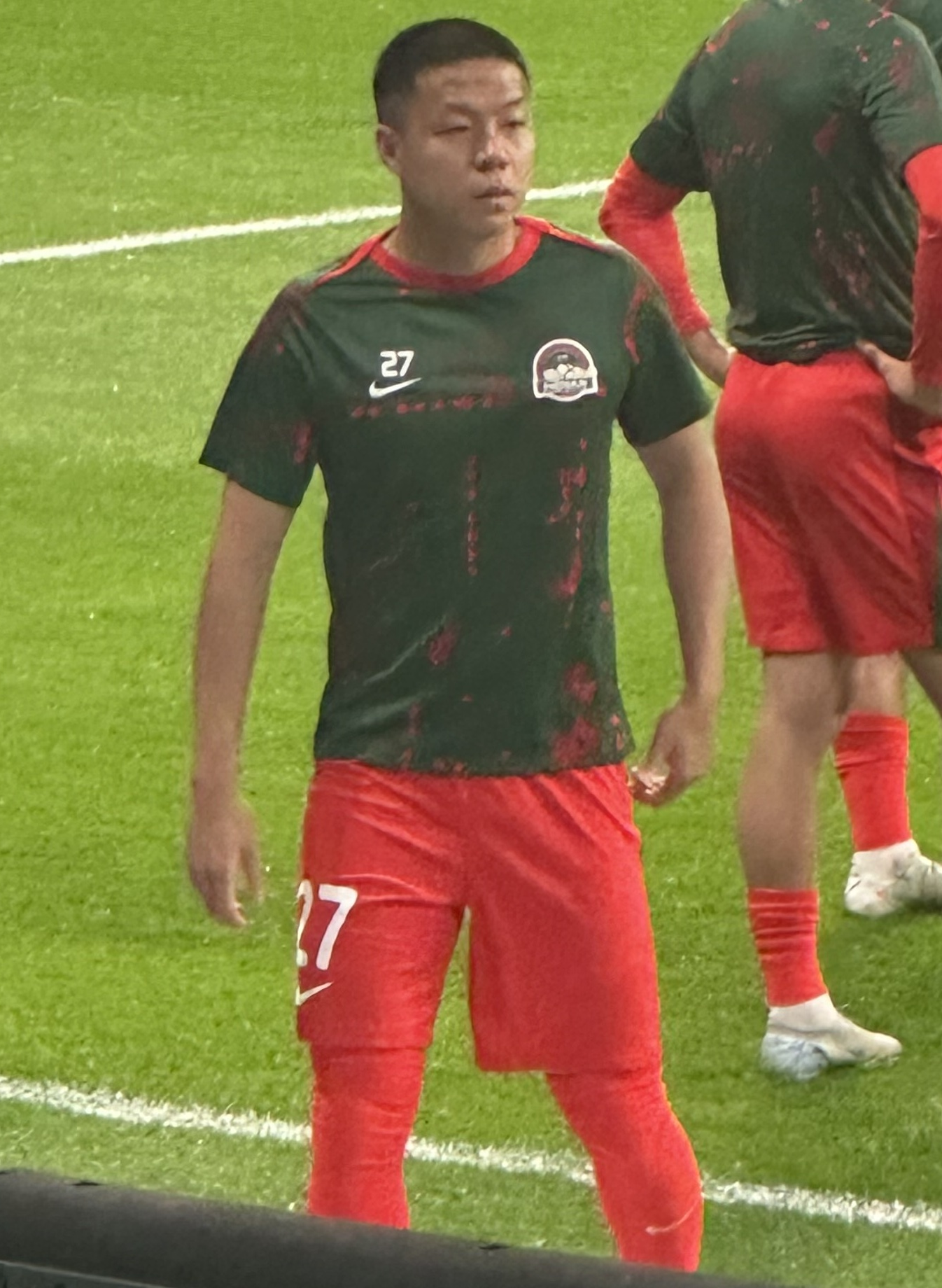
- Niu Ziyi in April 2025

Personal information
- Date of birth: 21 September 1999 (age 27)
- Place of birth: Zhoukou, Henan, China
- Height: 1.83 m (6 ft 0 in)
- Position: Defender

Team information
- Current team: Shijiazhuang Gongfu
- Number: 5

Youth career
- –2020: Henan Jianye

Senior career*
Years	Team	Apps	(Gls)
2020–2025	Henan FC	67	(0)
2026–	Shijiazhuang Gongfu	0	(0)
- * Club domestic league appearances and goals as of 28 August 2025

Niu Ziyi (Chinese: 牛梓屹; born 21 September 1999) is a Chinese footballer currently playing as a defender for China League One club Shijiazhuang Gongfu.

== Club career ==
Niu Ziyi was promoted to the senior team of Henan Jianye (now known as Henan FC) within the 2020 Chinese Super League season and would make his debut in league game on 14 August 2020 against Guangzhou Evergrande in a 3-1 defeat where he came on as a substitute for Abduwali Ablet. On 12 January 2026, Henan FC announced his departure after the 2025 season.

On 31 January 2026, Niu joined China League One club Shijiazhuang Gongfu.

== Career statistics ==
As of 31 December 2022

Club	Season	League			Cup		Continental		Other		Total	
Club	Season	Division	Apps	Goals	Apps	Goals	Apps	Goals	Apps	Goals	Apps	Goals
Henan Jianye/ Henan FC	2020	Chinese Super League	10	0	1	0	–		–		11	0
Henan Jianye/ Henan FC	2021	Chinese Super League	12	0	0	0	–		–		12	0
Henan Jianye/ Henan FC	2022	Chinese Super League	13	0	0	0	–		–		5	0
Henan Jianye/ Henan FC	Total		35	0	1	0	0	0	0	0	36	0
Career total			35	0	1	0	0	0	0	0	36	0
