= Shi Chenglong =

Chinese footballer

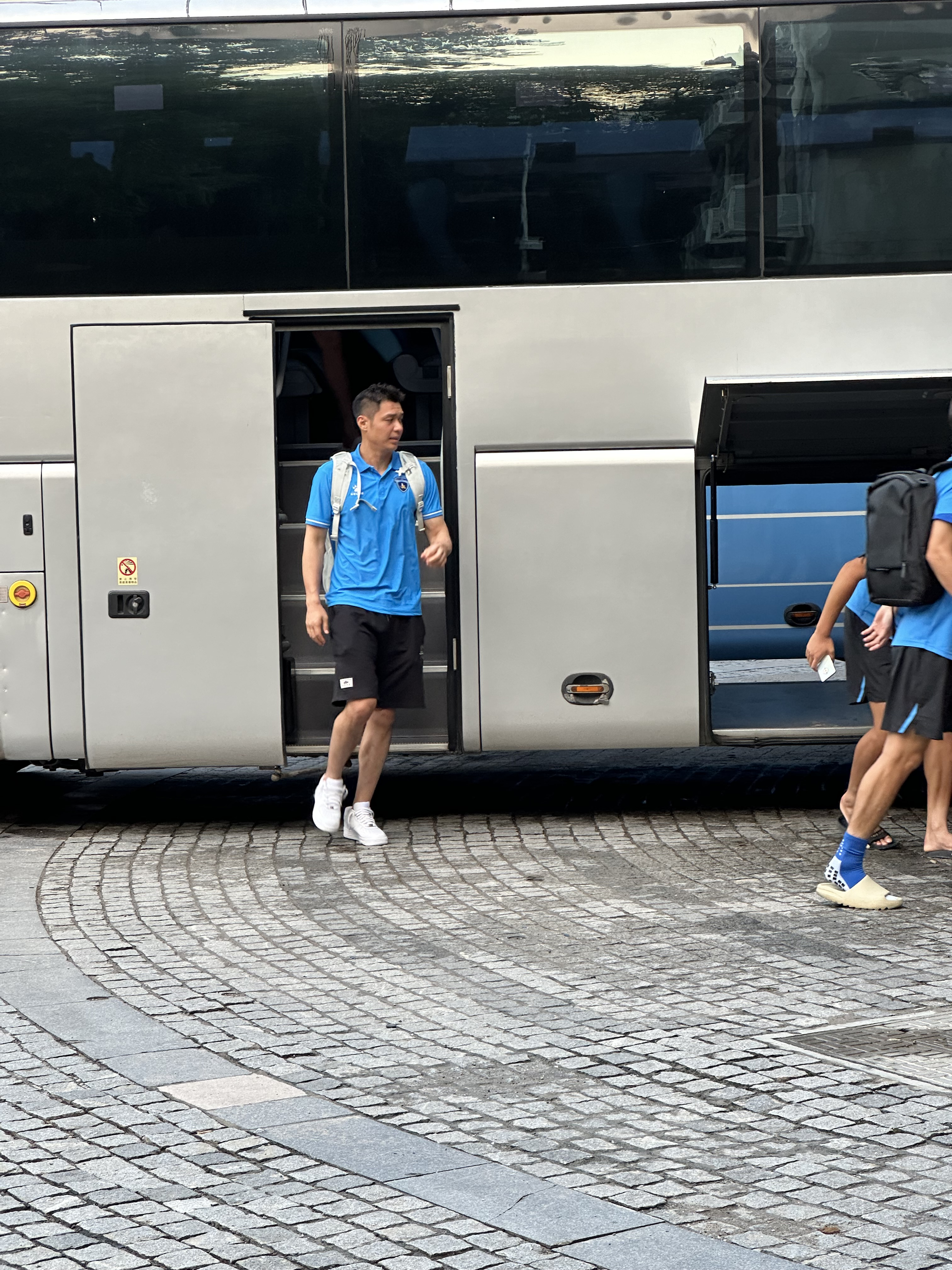
- Shi Chenglong in August 2024

Personal information
- Date of birth: 28 May 1999 (age 27)
- Place of birth: Xinxiang, Henan, China
- Height: 1.85 m (6 ft 1 in)
- Position: Goalkeeper

Team information
- Current team: Henan FC
- Number: 33

Youth career
- –2020: Henan Jianye

Senior career*
Years	Team	Apps	(Gls)
2020–	Henan FC	10	(0)
2024	→ Nanjing City (loan)	0	(0)
- * Club domestic league appearances and goals as of 22 November 2026

Shi Chenglong (Chinese: 史成龙; born 28 May 1999) is a Chinese footballer who plays as a goalkeeper for Henan FC.

== Club career ==
Shi Chenglong was promoted to the senior team of Henan Jianye (now known as Henan FC) in the 2020 Chinese Super League season. He made his debut in the league game on 21 September 2020 against Guangzhou Evergrande in a 2-1 defeat where he came on as a substitute for Wu Yan.

== Career statistics ==
As of 31 December 2024.

Appearances and goals by club, season and competition
Club	Season	League			Cup		Continental		Other		Total	
Club	Season	Division	Apps	Goals	Apps	Goals	Apps	Goals	Apps	Goals	Apps	Goals
Henan Jianye/ Henan Songshan Longmen/ Henan FC	2020	Chinese Super League	1	0	0	0	–		–		1	0
Henan Jianye/ Henan Songshan Longmen/ Henan FC	2021	Chinese Super League	0	0	0	0	–		–		0	0
Henan Jianye/ Henan Songshan Longmen/ Henan FC	2022	Chinese Super League	1	0	0	0	–		–		1	0
Henan Jianye/ Henan Songshan Longmen/ Henan FC	2023	Chinese Super League	0	0	0	0	–		–		0	0
Henan Jianye/ Henan Songshan Longmen/ Henan FC	2024	Chinese Super League	0	0	0	0	–		–		0	0
Henan Jianye/ Henan Songshan Longmen/ Henan FC	Total		2	0	0	0	0	0	0	0	2	0
Nanjing City (loan)	2024	China League One	0	0	0	0	–		–		0	0
Career total			2	0	0	0	0	0	0	0	2	0
