= Henan F.C. =

Chinese professional football club

Henan FC 河南
- Full name: Henan Football Club 河南足球俱乐部
- Nicknames: 红魔 (Red Devils)
- Founded: 1958; 68 years ago (semi-professional); 28 August 1994; 32 years ago (professional)
- Ground: Hanghai Stadium
- Capacity: 29,860
- Owner: Central China Real Estate Limited
- Chairman: Hu Baosen
- Head coach: vacant
- League: Chinese Super League
- 2026: Chinese Super League, 14th of 16
Home colours	Away colours

Henan Football Club (Chinese: 河南足球俱乐部; pinyin: Hénán Zúqiú Jùlèbù), currently known as Henan F.C. Jiuzu Dukang (Chinese: 河南俱乐部酒祖杜康) for sponsorship reasons, is a Chinese professional football club based in Zhengzhou, Henan, that competes in the Chinese Super League, the top tier of Chinese football. Henan plays their home matches at the Hanghai Stadium, located within Guancheng Hui District. Their owners are the Jianye Residential Group (China) Co., Ltd., which is part of the Central China Real Estate Limited. Their name referred to Jianye, a former name of the ancient city of Jiankang.

The club's predecessor was the Henan Provincial Team, which was founded in 1958, while the current professional football team was established on 27 August 1994 as Henan Construction (Chinese: 河南建业). The club has never won the league title and the highest position they have ever achieved was when they came third in the 2009 Chinese Super League season. In 2010, the club changed its name to Henan Jianye, then in 2021 to Henan Songshan Longmen (Chinese: 河南嵩山龙门), and to its current name in 2023.

== History ==
The football club was originally known as Henan Provincial team and was founded in 1958 by the local government sports body to take part in the 1959 Chinese National Games before joining the gradually expanding Chinese football league system. The team often spent much of its time in the second tier, except for a short period during the late 1970s when the league was expanded to accommodate more teams. When the Chinese football league system grew to accommodate a third tier, Henan found themselves in it when they were relegated from the second tier in the 1981 league season. However, they were able to quickly return to the second tier when they came out as top of the table to win promotion in the 1982 league season. It wasn't long until they won promotion to the top tier once more in the 1985 league season, where they would remain until the 1988 league season when they were relegated at the end of the season.

Henan Construction F.C. logo in 1995

By the 1994 league season, the entire Chinese football league system had become professional and Henan would quickly follow when they became professional on August 27, 1994, by selling a 40% stake of the club to Jianye Residential Group (China) Co., Ltd. and renamed themselves Henan Construction. Henan's transition toward professionalism was difficult and they were once more relegated at the end of the 1994 league season to the third tier. Once again, they would have to win promotion from the third tier when they came runners-up in the table at the 1995 league season. For several seasons, they were a second-tier club fighting against relegation until Henan Jianye Real Estate Development Co., Ltd. decided to take full control of the club on January 15, 1999. With this sure financial footing, the club would go on to win the division title and establish themselves back into the second tier.

The club won promotion to the Chinese Super League at the end of the 2006 league season after winning the division title. In their debut season in the top tier playing professional football, Henan brought in Pei Encai to add experience to their management and to help them avoid relegation, which he achieved when they finished the season in 12th position, narrowly avoiding relegation after defeating Changchun Yatai 3–2. While he helped them avoid relegation, Henan demanded results in the 2008 league season and this saw them go through several managers before they settled with Tang Yaodong to help them avoid relegation once more. His appointment ended up extremely successful, and throughout the 2009 league season he would lead them to a third-place finish, which is the highest league position they have ever achieved.

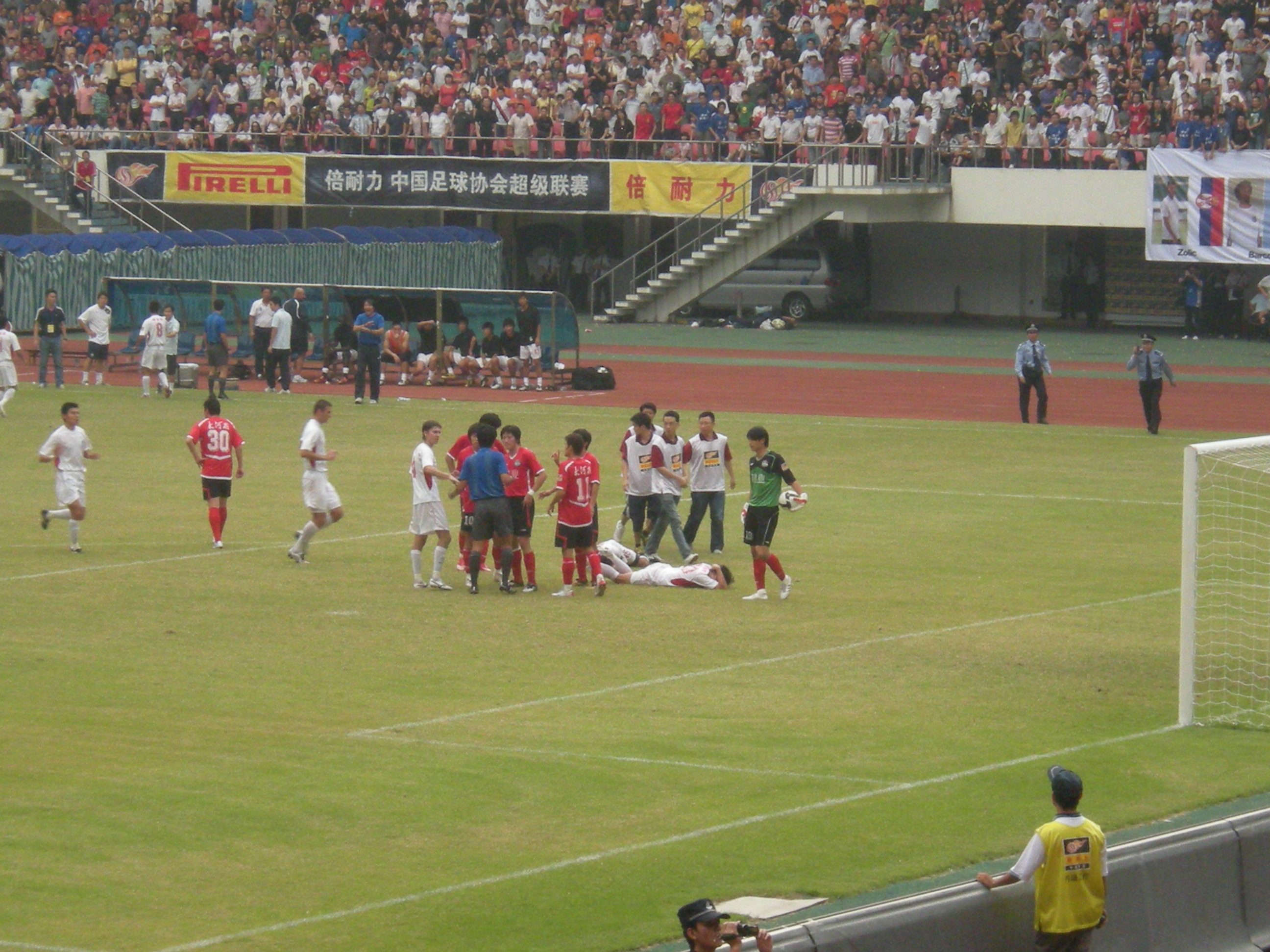
Shenzhen Ruby v Henan Construction in 2009

The third-place finish led to the club's first and only appearance in the AFC Champions League in 2010, after they changed their English name to Henan Jianye, while its Chinese name remained the same. Henan finished the championship with 3 draws and 3 losses in the group stage, and from then on, the club's performance dropped from year to year. In 2011, they finished the season in 13th position. After an even more chaotic and unsatisfying season in 2012, the club was relegated to the second division.

Henan appointed Tang Yaodong again in 2013, who helped the team return to the Chinese Super League after the season. However, Tang was dismissed once again halfway through the 2014 season due to the team's disastrous performance. Jia Xiuquan took the position. The team fought hard against Beijing Guoan in the last game of the season. This goalless game helped the club stay in the Chinese Super League by a narrow one point margin.

In 2026, Henan started the 2026 Chinese Super League season with six points deducted for violation of sports ethics and loss of sportsmanship, engaging in improper transactions to seek illegitimate benefits.

== Current squad ==
=== First team ===
As of July 2026

Note: Flags indicate national team as defined under FIFA eligibility rules; some limited exceptions apply. Players may hold more than one non-FIFA nationality.

No.	Pos.	Nation	Player
2	DF	BRA	Iago Maidana
3	DF	HKG	Oliver Gerbig
4	DF	CHN	Yeljan Shinar
5	MF	CHN	Liu Jiahui
6	DF	CHN	Wang Shangyuan (captain)
7	MF	CHN	Zhong Yihao
8	FW	BRA	Maranhão
9	FW	BRA	Gustavo
10	MF	BRA	Bruno Nazário
11	DF	CHN	Nebijan Muhmet (on loan from Beijing Guoan)
13	MF	CHN	Abdurasul Abudulam
15	MF	CHN	Ablahan Haliq
16	MF	CHN	Yang Kuo
17	GK	CHN	Wang Jinshuai
18	GK	CHN	Wang Guoming

No.	Pos.	Nation	Player
21	MF	CHN	He Chao
22	MF	CHN	Huang Ruifeng
23	DF	BRA	Lucas Maia
24	MF	CHN	Yin Congyao
25	MF	CHN	Yang Yilin
26	GK	CHN	Xu Jiamin
27	DF	CHN	Liu Yixin
28	MF	CHN	Du Changjie
29	MF	CHN	Zheng Dalun
30	MF	CHN	Fan Xulin (on loan from Hubei Istar)
33	GK	CHN	Shi Chenglong
39	MF	CHN	Ekber Osman
40	GK	CHN	Zhai Mingwang
41	GK	CHN	Wang Chaohui
45	MF	CHN	Chen Hanyang
46	FW	CHN	Ren Minghao

=== On loan ===
Note: Flags indicate national team as defined under FIFA eligibility rules; some limited exceptions apply. Players may hold more than one non-FIFA nationality.

No.	Pos.	Nation	Player
—	MF	CHN	Hua Mingcan (at Wenzhou FC until 31 December 2026)
—	MF	CHN	Li Xingxian (at Nantong Zhiyun until 31 December 2026)
—	MF	CHN	Wu Fei (at (China) Guizhou Guiyang Athletic until 31 December 2026)

No.	Pos.	Nation	Player
—	DF	CHN	Liu Zongyuan (at (China) BIT until 31 December 2026)
—	FW	CHN	Zheng Junwei (at (China) Foshan Nanshi until 31 December 2026)
—	DF	CHN	Xu Haofeng (at (China) Wuhan Three Towns until 31 December 2026)
—	MF	CHN	Chen Keqiang (at (China) Yanbian Longding until 31 December 2026)

== Coaching staff ==
Position	Staff
Head coach	vacant
Assistant coach	(Portugal) João Moreira da Silva
Assistant coach	(Portugal) Renato Pontes
Assistant coach	(China) Lu Feng
Goalkeeper coach	(China) Guan Xin
Fitness coach	(China) Zhao Yuan

Source: http://www.jianyefc.com/a/qiudui/

=== Managerial history ===
Managers who have coached the club and team since Henan became a fully professional club back on August 27, 1994.

- (China) Zhang Changhai (Aug 1994 – Dec 1994)
- (China) Wang Suisheng (Dec 1994 – Aug 1998)
- (China) Ding Sanshi (Aug 1998 – June 1999)
- (China) Wang Suisheng (Jun 1999 – July 2001)
- (Croatia) Miloš Hrstić (Jul 2001 – Aug 2002)
- (China) Chi Shangbin (Jan 1, 2003 – Dec 31, 2003)
- (China) Yin Lihua (Oct 2004 – Sep 2005)
- (China) Chen Wenjie (interim) (Sep 2005 – Nov 2005)
- (China) Meng Wenfeng (Nov 2005 – Sep 2007)
- (China) Pei Encai (Sep 25, 2007 – Dec 20, 2007)
- (China) Jia Xiuquan (Dec 20, 2007 – Jun 2008)
- (Portugal) Acácio Casimiro (Jun 2008 – Sep 15, 2008)
- (China) Tang Yaodong (Sep 15, 2008 – Nov 12, 2010)
- (South Korea) Kim Hak-bum (Nov 12, 2010 – May 23, 2011)
- (China) Zhao Wei (interim) (May 1, 2011 – Jun 30, 2011)
- (Netherlands) Jo Bonfrère (Jun 30, 2011 – Dec 31, 2011)
- (Netherlands) Jan Versleijen (Jan 1, 2012 – Jul 15, 2012)
- (China) Shen Xiangfu (interim) (Jul 16, 2012 – Nov 30, 2012)
- (China) Tang Yaodong (Nov 30, 2012 – May 28, 2014)
- (China) Jia Xiuquan (Jun 3, 2014 –Jun 3, 2017)
- (Bulgaria) Yasen Petrov (Jun 13, 2017 –Sep 30, 2017)
- (China) Guo Guangqi (Sep 30, 2017 – Dec 18, 2017)
- (Croatia) Dragan Talajić (Dec 18, 2017 – Apr 21, 2018)
- (South Korea) Chang Woe-ryong (Apr 26, 2018 – Sep 27, 2018)
- (China) Wang Baoshan (Sep 27, 2018 – Jul 6, 2020)
- (China) Yang Ji (interim) (Jul 6, 2020 – Sep 11, 2020)
- (Spain) Javier Pereira (Sep 11, 2020 – Oct 6, 2021)
- (Spain) Antonio Carreño (Oct 7, 2021 – Jan 9, 2022)
- (Spain) Javier Pereira (Jan 9, 2022 – Mar 1, 2023)
- (Spain) Sergio Zarco Díaz (Mar 7, 2023 – Jan 7, 2024)
- (South Korea) Nam Ki-il (Jan 7, 2024 – Apr 29, 2025)
- (Portugal) Daniel Ramos (Apr 29, 2025 –Nov 11, 2026)

== Honours ==
All-time honours list including semi-professional Henan Provincial team period.

=== League ===
- Chinese Jia B League/Chinese League One (Second Tier League)
  - Winners (3): 1989, 2006, 2013
- Chinese Yi League/Chinese League Two (Third Tier League)
  - Winners (2): 1982, 1999

=== Youth team ===
- U-19 Chinese FA Cup
  - Winners: 2007
- U-17 Chinese FA Cup
  - Winners: 2006, 2007

== Results ==
All-time League Rankings

As of the end of 2025 season.

Year	Div	Pld	W	D	L	GF	GA	GD	Pts	Pos.	FA Cup	Super Cup	League Cup	AFC	Att./G	Stadium
1963	2	11	5	2	4	12	12	0	3^{1}	5^{1}	NH	–	–			
1965	2									5^{2}	NH	–	–			
1973	1	19	8	3	8	19	20	−1	13^{1}	24	NH	–	–			
1974	1	13	3	3	7	7	18	−11	3^{1}	34	NH	–	–			
1976	1	8	0	4	4	2	19	−17	4	8^{2}	NH	–	–			
1977	1	7	3	1	3	11	8	3	7	36	NH	–	–			
1978	2	42	12	13	17	51	53	−2	37	16	NH	–	–			
1979	2	42	15	8	19	46	55	−9	38	14	NH	–	–			
1980	2	30	10	9	11	27	35	−8	29	9	NH	–	–			
1981	2	30	10	–	20				20	13	NH	–	–			
1982	3	8^{1}	7	–	1	11	2	9	14^{1}	W	NH	–	–			
1983	2	15	8	–	7				16	8	NH	–	–			
1984	2	7^{1}	2	–	5				4^{1}	7	DNQ	–	–			
1985	2									3	DNQ	–	–			
1986	1	14	3	3	8	11	16	−5	9	12	NH	–	–			
1987	2	20	7	9	4	24	14	10	23	4	NH	–	–			
1988	1	25	7	9	9	21	24	−3	33	12	NH	–	–			
1989	2	22	14	7	1	44	17	27	52	W	NH	–	–			
1990	1	14	0	1	13	5	28	−23	1	8	R1	–	–			
1991	2	16	4	10	2	19	15	4	18	5	R1	–	–			
1992	2	10	1	7	2	7	10	−3	10	5^{2}	R2	–	–			
1993	2	5	1	0/0	4	7	9	−2	2	6^{2}	NH	–	–			
1994	2	20	5	3	12	22	27	−5	13	10	NH	–	–			Henan Provincial Stadium
1995	3	8	5	2	1				10^{1}	RU	DNQ	DNQ	–			Henan Provincial Stadium
1996	2	22	6	6	10	20	33	−13	24	8	R1	DNQ	–		21,000	Henan Provincial Stadium
1997	2	22	9	7	6	21	18	3	34	5	R1	DNQ	–		20,000	Henan Provincial Stadium
1998	2	22	5	10	7	23	31	−8	25	11	R1	DNQ	–		23,000	Xinxiang Sports Centre
1999	3	21	10	8	3	28	14	14	6^{1}	W	DNQ	DNQ	–			Xinxiang Sports Centre
2000	2	22	6	9	7	28	34	−6	27	9	R1	DNQ	–		18,000	Xinxiang Sports Centre
2001	2	22	8	5	9	24	30	−6	29	7	R2	DNQ	–		18,727	Xinxiang Sports Centre
2002	2	22	6	8	8	23	28	−5	26	10	R1	DNQ	–		8,500	Xigong Stadium
2003	2	26	14	6	6	33	24	9	48	RU^{3}	QF	DNQ	–		15,385	Zhengzhou Hanghai Stadium
2004	2	32	11	12	9	29	27	2	45	7	R2	NH	DNQ		9,794	Xinxiang Sports Centre
2005	2	26	7	6	13	28	37	−9	27	10	R2	NH	DNQ		10,833	Xinxiang Sports Centre
2006	2	24	18	5	1	38	13	25	59	W	R2	NH	NH		20,583	Zhengzhou Hanghai Stadium
2007	1	28	5	12	11	20	28	−8	27	12	NH	NH	NH		16,857	Zhengzhou Hanghai Stadium
2008	1	30	9	9	12	30	31	−1	36	10	NH	NH	NH		16,267	Zhengzhou Hanghai Stadium
2009	1	30	13	9	8	35	26	9	48	3	NH	NH	NH		19,255	Zhengzhou Hanghai Stadium
2010	1	30	9	13	8	31	31	0	40	8	NH	NH	NH	Group	18,630	Zhengzhou Hanghai Stadium
2011	1	30	7	11	12	29	35	−6	32	13	QF	NH	NH		16,334	Zhengzhou Hanghai Stadium
2012	1	30	7	5	18	28	56	−28	26	16	R4	DNQ	NH		17,526	Zhengzhou Hanghai Stadium
2013	2	30	18	8	4	51	21	30	62	W	R3	DNQ	NH		19,076	Zhengzhou Hanghai Stadium
2014	1	30	6	12	12	32	39	−7	30	14	QF	DNQ	NH		18,390	Zhengzhou Hanghai Stadium
2015	1	30	12	10	8	35	30	5	46	5	QF	DNQ	NH		20,207	Zhengzhou Hanghai Stadium
2016	1	30	10	5	15	26	44	−18	35	13	QF	DNQ	NH		17,282	Zhengzhou Hanghai Stadium
2017	1	30	7	9	14	34	46	−12	30	14	R4	DNQ	NH		18,933	Zhengzhou Hanghai Stadium
2018	1	30	10	4	16	30	45	−15	34	12	R4	DNQ	NH		18,402	Zhengzhou Hanghai Stadium
2019	1	30	11	8	11	41	46	-5	41	8	R4	DNQ	NH		20,360	Zhengzhou Hanghai Stadium
2020	1	20	5	5	10	21	37	-16	20	9	R1	DNQ	NH			
2021	1	22	7	9	6	19	20	-1	30	10	SF	DNQ	NH			
2022	1	34	17	8	9	60	32	28	59	6	R16	DNQ	NH			Zhengzhou Hanghai Stadium
2023	1	30	9	9	12	38	40	-2	36	10	R16	DNQ	NH		16,246	Zhengzhou Hanghai Stadium
2024	1	30	9	9	12	34	39	-5	36	9	QF	DNQ	NH		15,849	Zhengzhou Hanghai Stadium
2025	1	30	10	7	13	52	48	4	37	10	RU	DNQ	NH		16,082	Zhengzhou Hanghai Stadium

no league game in 1966–72, 1975;
no Division 2 league game in 1961–63;

- ^1 In final group. ^2 In group stage. ^3 No promotion.

Key

	China top division
	China second division
	China third division
W	Winners
RU	Runners-up
3	Third place
	Relegated

- Pld = Played
- W = Games won
- D = Games drawn
- L = Games lost
- F = Goals for
- A = Goals against
- Pts = Points
- Pos = Final position
- DNQ = Did not qualify
- DNE = Did not enter
- NH = Not Held
- – = Does Not Exist
- R1 = Round 1
- R2 = Round 2
- R3 = Round 3
- R4 = Round 4
- F = Final
- SF = Semi-finals
- QF = Quarter-finals
- R16 = Round of 16
- Group = Group stage
- GS2 = Second Group stage
- QR1 = First Qualifying Round
- QR2 = Second Qualifying Round
- QR3 = Third Qualifying Round

=== Continental results ===
Season	Competition	Round	Opposition	Home	Away	Rank /Agg.
2010	AFC Champions League	Group stage	Singapore Armed Forces	0–0	1–2	4th
2010	AFC Champions League	Group stage	(Japan) Gamba Osaka	1–1	1–1	4th
2010	AFC Champions League	Group stage	(South Korea) Suwon Samsung Bluewings	0–2	0–2	4th
