= Abdurasul Abudulam =

Chinese association football player

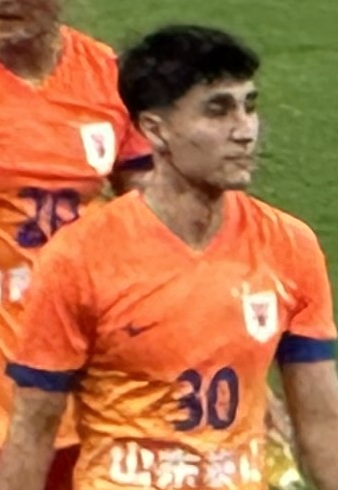
- Abdurasul in August 2024

Personal information
- Date of birth: 10 March 2001 (age 25)
- Place of birth: Altay, Xinjiang, China
- Height: 1.74 m (5 ft 9 in)
- Position: Midfielder

Team information
- Current team: Henan FC
- Number: 13

Youth career
- –2020: Shandong Taishan

Senior career*
Years	Team	Apps	(Gls)
2020–2025	Shandong Taishan	23	(2)
2020	→ China U19 (loan)	5	(0)
2021	→ China U20 (loan)	11	(1)
2025	→ Henan FC (loan)	8	(0)
2026–	Henan FC	22	(0)

International career^{‡}
2017–2019	China U19	6	(0)
2023	China U22	3	(0)
- * Club domestic league appearances and goals as of 22 November 2026 ‡ National team caps and goals as of 00:01, 25 December 2021 (UTC)

Abdurasul Abudulam (Chinese: 阿卜杜肉苏力·阿不都拉木; born 10 March 2001) is a Chinese footballer currently playing as a midfielder for Henan FC.

== Club career ==
Abdurasul played for the Shandong youth team before being promoted to their senior team. To gain more time he was loaned out to the China U19 team and subsequently the China U20 team, who were allowed to take part in the third tier of the Chinese pyramid. On his return. he made his debut for Shandong on 3 July 2022 in a league game against Guangzhou City that ended in a 2-0 victory. This was followed by his first goal for the club, which was in a league game on 26 November 2022 against Wuhan Yangtze River in a 5-0 victory. He gained more playing time as he partook in the squad that won the 2022 Chinese FA Cup.

On 17th July 2025, Abdurasul was loaned to Henan FC. After the 2025 season, Abdurasul officially joined Henan FC on 28 February 2026.

== Career statistics ==
As of 31 January 2023.

Club	Season	League			Cup		Continental		Other		Total	
Club	Season	Division	Apps	Goals	Apps	Goals	Apps	Goals	Apps	Goals	Apps	Goals
Shandong Taishan	2020	Chinese Super League	0	0	0	0	-		-		0	0
Shandong Taishan	2021	Chinese Super League	0	0	0	0	-		-		0	0
Shandong Taishan	2022	Chinese Super League	7	1	4	0	0	0	-		11	1
Shandong Taishan	Total		0	0	0	0	0	0	0	0	0	0
China U19 (loan)	2020	China League Two	5	0	0	0	-		-		5	0
China U20 (loan)	2021	China League Two	11	1	1	0	-		-		12	1
Career total			23	2	5	0	0	0	0	0	28	2

== Honours ==
=== Club ===
Shandong Taishan

- Chinese FA Cup: 2022.
