= Yang Yilin (footballer) =

Chinese association football player

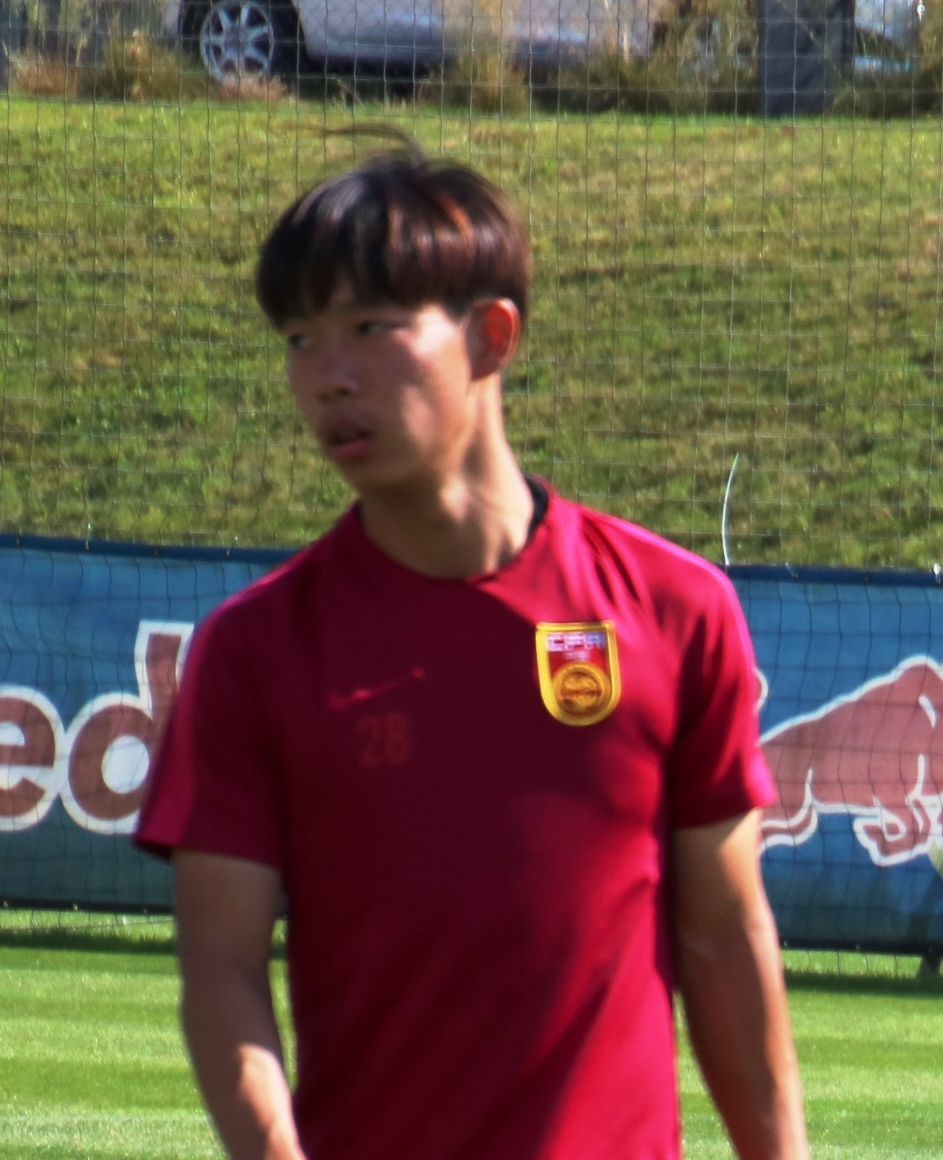
- Yang Yilin in 2018

Personal information
- Date of birth: 23 February 1999 (age 27)
- Place of birth: Luoyang, Henan, China
- Height: 1.73 m (5 ft 8 in)
- Position: Midfielder

Team information
- Current team: Henan FC
- Number: 25

Youth career
- –2017: Shandong Taishan

Senior career*
Years	Team	Apps	(Gls)
2018–2019	Estudiantes de Murcia	26	(1)
2019–2022	Shandong Taishan	0	(0)
2020	→ Meizhou Hakka (loan)	5	(0)
2022–2023	Meizhou Hakka	35	(3)
2024–	Henan FC	60	(1)

International career^{‡}
2016	China U17	1	(0)
2018	China U19	6	(0)
- * Club domestic league appearances and goals as of 22 November 2026 ‡ National team caps and goals as of 14:01, 28 July 2021 (UTC)

Yang Yilin (Chinese: 杨意林; born 23 February 1999) is a Chinese footballer currently playing as a midfielder for Henan FC.

== Club career ==
Yang Yilin would play for the Shandong Taishan youth team where he was sent out to São Paulo, Brazil for training before he was allowed to join fourth tier Spanish club Estudiantes de Murcia. With them he would make his senior debut on 27 August 2018 in a league game against UCAM Murcia B that ended in a 1–0 defeat. He would return to Shandong after a season and then eventually loaned out to second-tier club Meizhou Hakka on 13 February 2020. At Meizhou he would make his first appearance for them on 13 September 2020 in a league game that saw them win 2–0 against Liaoning Shenyang Urban. On his return to Shandong he would be dropped to the reserve team throughout the 2021 Chinese Super League season. On 29 April 2022, Yang returned to Meizhou on a permanent transfer.

== Career statistics ==
As of 31 December 2025.

Club	Season	League			Cup		Continental		Other		Total	
Club	Season	Division	Apps	Goals	Apps	Goals	Apps	Goals	Apps	Goals	Apps	Goals
Estudiantes de Murcia	2018–19	Tercera División	26	1	0	0	–		–		26	1
Shandong Taishan	2019	Chinese Super League	0	0	0	0	0	0	–		0	0
Shandong Taishan	2020	Chinese Super League	0	0	0	0	–		–		0	0
Shandong Taishan	2021	Chinese Super League	0	0	0	0	–		–		0	0
Shandong Taishan	Total		0	0	0	0	0	0	0	0	0	0
Meizhou Hakka (loan)	2020	China League One	5	0	0	0	–		–		5	0
Meizhou Hakka	2022	Chinese Super League	25	3	1	0	–		–		26	3
Meizhou Hakka	2023	Chinese Super League	10	0	1	0	–		–		11	0
Meizhou Hakka	Total		35	3	2	0	0	0	0	0	37	3
Henan FC	2024	Chinese Super League	29	0	3	0	–		–		32	0
Henan FC	2025	Chinese Super League	19	1	2	0	–		–		21	1
Henan FC	Total		48	1	5	0	0	0	0	0	53	1
Career total			114	5	7	0	0	0	0	0	121	5
