= Li Xingxian =

Chinese association football player

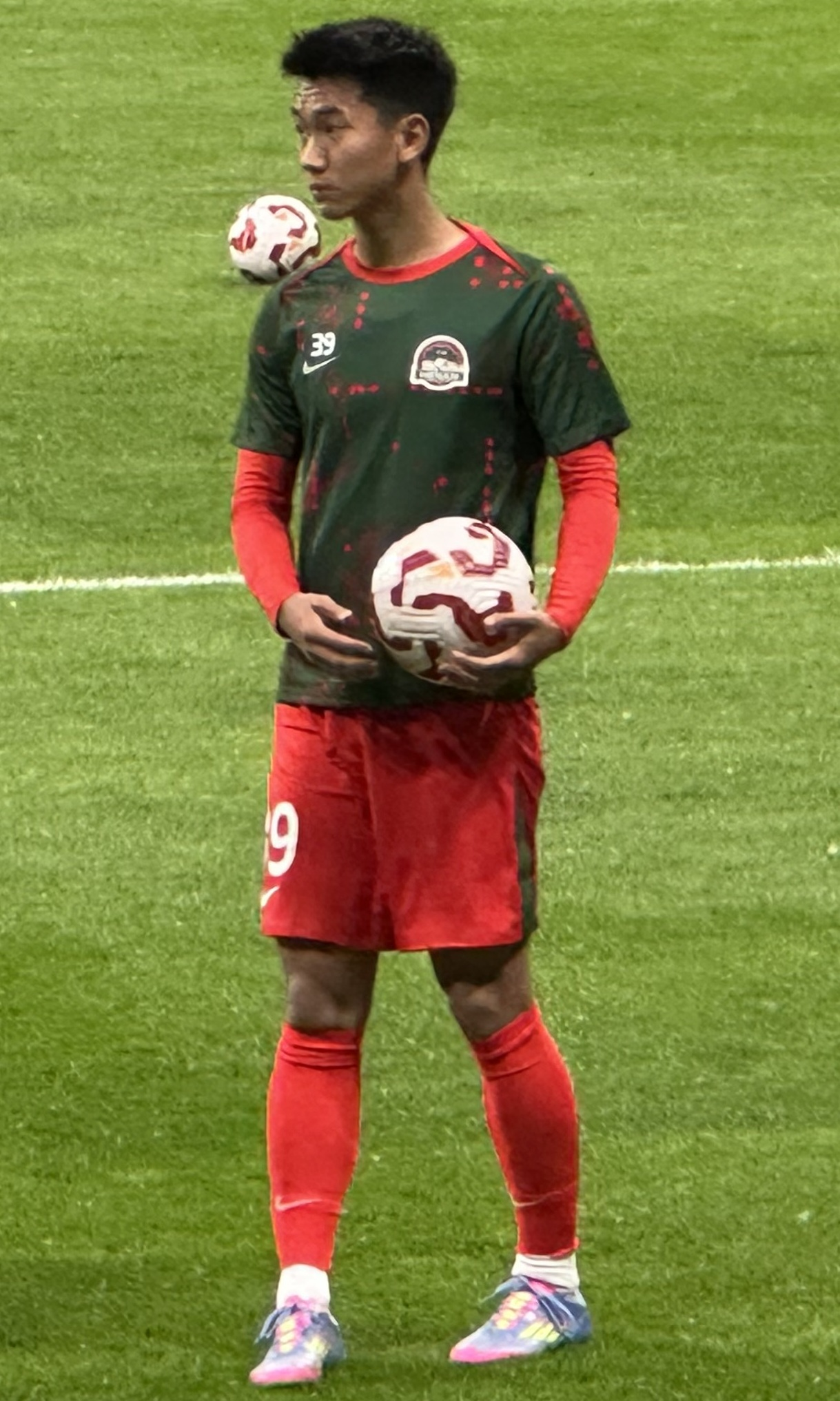
- Li Xingxian in April 2025

Personal information
- Date of birth: 24 March 2005 (age 21)
- Place of birth: Zhengzhou, Henan, China
- Height: 1.80 m (5 ft 11 in)
- Positions: Forward; midfielder

Team information
- Current team: Nantong Zhiyun (on loan from Henan FC)
- Number: 24

Youth career
- –2021: Evergrande Football School

Senior career*
Years	Team	Apps	(Gls)
2021–2024	Guangzhou FC	3	(0)
2024	→ Haikou Mingcheng (loan)	9	(0)
2025–	Henan FC	6	(0)
2026–	→ Nantong Zhiyun (loan)	0	(0)
- * Club domestic league appearances and goals as of 28 August 2025

Li Xingxian (Chinese: 李星贤; born 24 March 2005) is a Chinese footballer currently playing as a forward or midfielder for Nantong Zhiyun, on loan from Henan FC.

== Club career ==
Li Xingxian was promoted to the senior team of Guangzhou FC in 2021. He made his debut in an AFC Champions League game on 3 July 2021 against Kitchee SC in a 1–0 defeat. He was given a run of games within the team as the club went through a turbulent period as Guangzhou's majority shareholder was in financial trouble and the club started to lose several key players. The team was relegated from the top-tier in the 2022 Chinese Super League campaign, ending their twelve-season stay in the top flight. Li remained with the team and go on to establish himself as a regular squad member within the club as he helped guide them to a twelfth-placed finish.

On 17 January 2025, Li signed with Chinese Super League club Henan FC.

On 21 February 2026, Li was loan out to China League One club Nantong Zhiyun for the 2026 season.

== Career statistics ==
As of 26 March 2024.

Club	Season	League			Cup		Continental		Other		Total	
Club	Season	Division	Apps	Goals	Apps	Goals	Apps	Goals	Apps	Goals	Apps	Goals
Guangzhou FC	2021	Chinese Super League	1	0	1	0	1 (Note: Appearances in the AFC Champions League)	0	–		3	0
Guangzhou FC	2022	Chinese Super League	0	0	0	0	0	0	–		0	0
Guangzhou FC	2023	China League One	2	0	0	0	–		–		2	0
Guangzhou FC	2024	China League One	0	0	0	0	–		–		0	0
Career total			3	0	1	0	1	0	0	0	5	0
