= Yang Kuo =

Chinese footballer

Yang Kuo 杨阔
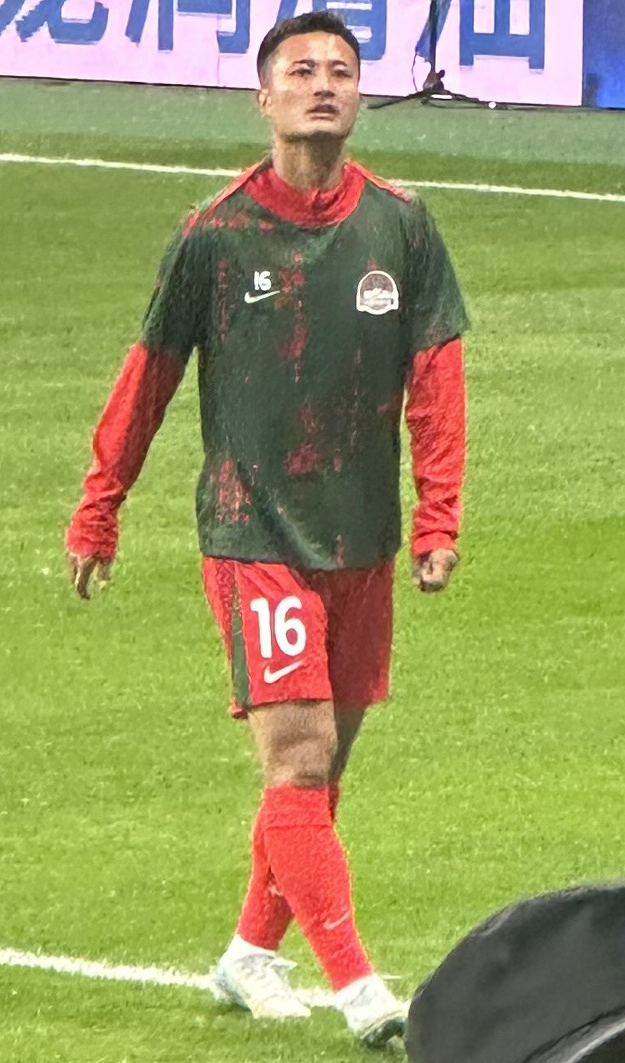
- Yang Kuo in April 2025

Personal information
- Date of birth: January 8, 1993 (age 33)
- Place of birth: Luoyang, Henan, China
- Height: 1.80 m (5 ft 11 in)
- Positions: Right-back; midfielder

Team information
- Current team: Henan FC
- Number: 16

Youth career
- Shandong Luneng

Senior career*
Years	Team	Apps	(Gls)
2011–2012	Shandong Youth	37	(3)
2013	Shandong Luneng	0	(0)
2014–2020	Henan Jianye	102	(1)
2021–2023	Wuhan Three Towns	31	(3)
2024–	Henan FC	14	(0)

International career
2015	China U22	1	(0)
- * Club domestic league appearances and goals as of 22 November 2026

Yang Kuo (Chinese: 杨阔; born 8 January 1993 in Luoyang, Henan) is a Chinese football player who currently plays as a right-back or midfielder for Henan FC.

== Club career ==
Yang Kuo started his professional football career in the 2011 league season for third tier club Shandong Youth. After two seasons he joined their affiliated club, Shandong Luneng in the 2013 Chinese Super League campaign. After a season with them he was allowed to leave and on 31 December 2013, Yang transferred to Chinese Super League side Henan Jianye. He eventually made his league debut for Henan on 13 April 2014 in a game against Guangzhou R&F, coming on as a substitute for Zhu Yifan in the 70th minute.

On 2 April 2021, Yang joined second tier club Wuhan Three Towns. In his debut season he would go on to establish himself as a vital member of the team and aid the club to win the league title and gain promotion as the club entered the top tier for the first time in their history. The following campaign he would be part of the squad that won the 2022 Chinese Super League title.

== Career statistics ==
Statistics accurate as of match played 11 January 2023.

Club	Season	League			National Cup		Continental		Other		Total	
Club	Season	Division	Apps	Goals	Apps	Goals	Apps	Goals	Apps	Goals	Apps	Goals
Shandong Youth	2011	China League Two	14	0	-		-		-		14	0
Shandong Youth	2012	China League Two	23	3	1	1	-		-		24	4
Shandong Youth	Total		37	3	1	1	0	0	0	0	38	4
Shandong Luneng Taishan	2013	Chinese Super League	0	0	0	0	-		-		0	0
Henan Jianye	2014	Chinese Super League	10	0	0	0	-		-		10	0
Henan Jianye	2015	Chinese Super League	20	0	2	0	-		-		22	0
Henan Jianye	2016	Chinese Super League	12	0	0	0	-		-		12	0
Henan Jianye	2017	Chinese Super League	22	0	1	0	-		-		23	0
Henan Jianye	2018	Chinese Super League	23	1	0	0	-		-		23	1
Henan Jianye	2019	Chinese Super League	4	0	0	0	-		-		4	0
Henan Jianye	2020	Chinese Super League	11	0	1	0	-		-		12	0
Henan Jianye	Total		102	1	4	0	0	0	0	0	106	1
Wuhan Three Towns	2021	China League One	21	2	0	0	-		-		21	2
Wuhan Three Towns	2022	Chinese Super League	10	1	3	0	-		-		13	1
Wuhan Three Towns	Total		31	3	3	0	0	0	0	0	34	3
Career total			170	7	8	1	0	0	0	0	178	8

== Honours ==
=== Club ===
Wuhan Three Towns

- Chinese Super League: 2022.
- China League One: 2021
