= Yeljan Shinar =

Chinese footballer

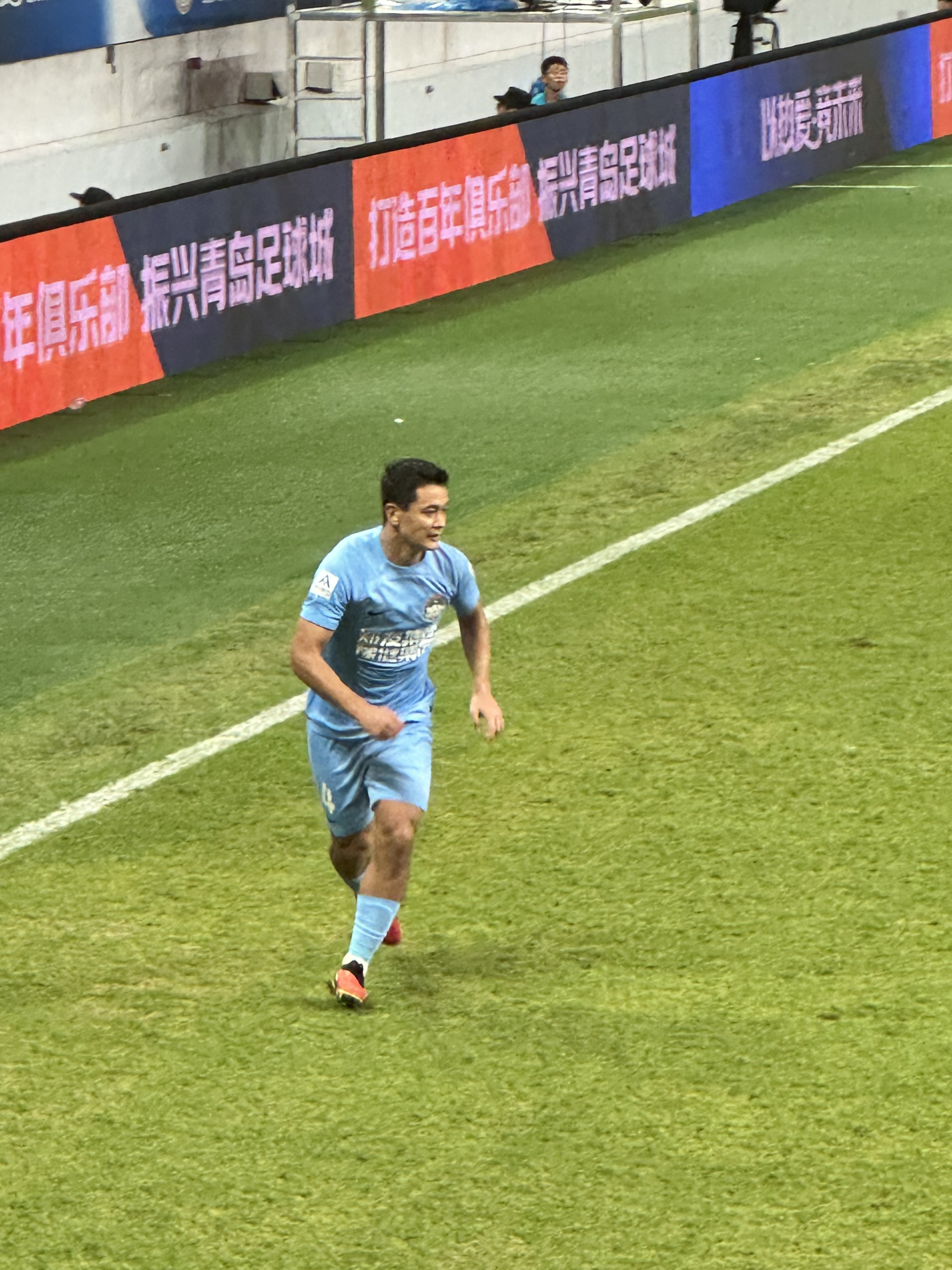
- Yeljan in August 2024

Personal information
- Date of birth: 6 June 1999 (age 27)
- Place of birth: Altay Prefecture, Xinjiang, China
- Height: 1.78 m (5 ft 10 in)
- Position: Right-back

Team information
- Current team: Henan FC
- Number: 4

Youth career
- –2018: Sichuan FA

Senior career*
Years	Team	Apps	(Gls)
2019–2022	Shenzhen FC	51	(1)
2020	→ Beijing BSU (loan)	15	(0)
2023–2024	Nantong Zhiyun	44	(0)
2024–	Henan FC	50	(0)

International career^{‡}
2022–2023	China U23	6	(0)
2022–	China	1	(0)
Medal record
Representing China
Men's football
EAFF Championship
Bronze medal – third place	2022 Japan	Team
- * Club domestic league appearances and goals as of 22 November 2026 ‡ National team caps and goals as of 27 July 2022

Yeljan Shinar (Chinese: 叶力江·什那尔; pinyin: Yèlìjiāng Shínàěr; Kazakh: Елжан Шынар, romanized: Eljan Şınar; born 6 June 1999) is a Chinese professional footballer who plays as a right-back for Chinese Super League club Henan FC.

== Club career ==
Yeljan Shinar would be promoted to the senior team of Shenzhen in the 2019 Chinese Super League campaign and would make his debut in league game on 7 July 2019 against Hebei China Fortune F.C. in a 1-1 draw. On 18 July 2020 he would be loaned out to second tier football club Beijing BSU for the 2020 China League One campaign. He would make his debut for Beijing BSU in a league game on 13 September 2020 against Nei Mongol Zhongyou in a 1-0 victory.

== International career ==
On 27 July 2022, Yeljan made his international debut in a 1-0 win against Hong Kong in the 2022 EAFF E-1 Football Championship, as the Chinese FA decided to field the U-23 national team for this senior competition.

== Career statistics ==
As of 1 January 2026

Club	Season	League			Cup		Continental		Other		Total	
Club	Season	Division	Apps	Goals	Apps	Goals	Apps	Goals	Apps	Goals	Apps	Goals
Shenzhen FC	2019	Chinese Super League	12	0	0	0	-		-		12	0
Shenzhen FC	2021	Chinese Super League	18	0	4	0	-		-		22	0
Shenzhen FC	2022	Chinese Super League	21	1	0	0	-		-		21	1
Shenzhen FC	Total		51	1	4	0	0	0	0	0	55	1
Beijing BSU (loan)	2020	China League One	15	0	-		-		-		15	0
Nantong Zhiyun	2023	Chinese Super League	26	0	2	0	-		-		28	0
Nantong Zhiyun	2024	Chinese Super League	18	0	1	0	-		-		19	0
Nantong Zhiyun	Total		44	0	3	0	0	0	0	0	47	0
Henan FC	2025	Chinese Super League	22	0	4	0	-		-		26	0
Career total			132	1	11	0	0	0	0	0	143	1
