= Bruno Nazário =

Brazilian footballer (born 1995)

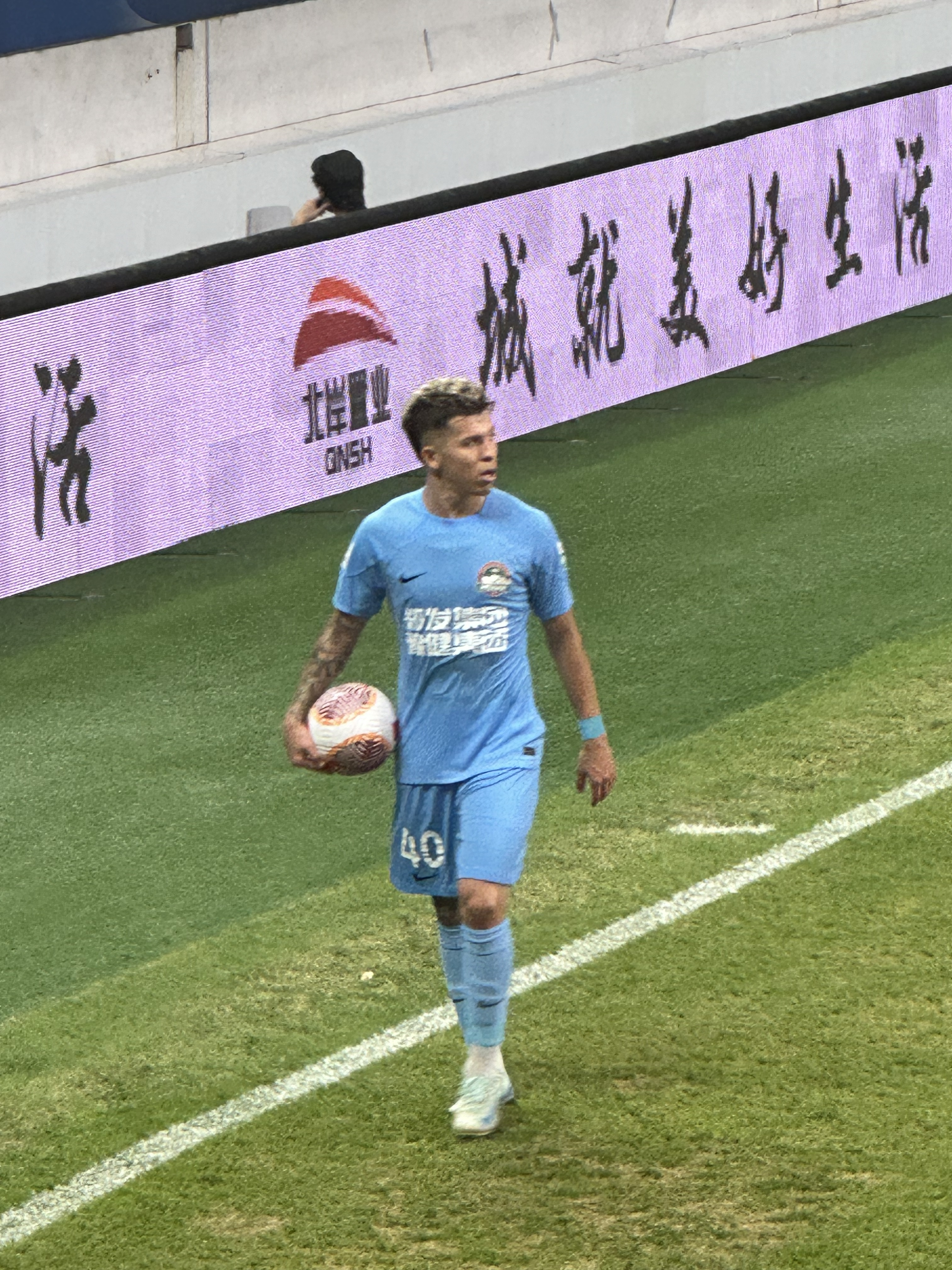
- Nazário in 2024

Personal information
- Full name: Bruno dos Santos Nazário
- Date of birth: 9 February 1995 (age 31)
- Place of birth: Cascavel, Brazil
- Height: 1.78 m (5 ft 10 in)
- Position: Attacking midfielder

Team information
- Current team: Henan FC
- Number: 10

Youth career
- Cascavel
- 2010–2013: Figueirense

Senior career*
Years	Team	Apps	(Gls)
2012–2013	Figueirense	8	(1)
2013	Tombense	0	(0)
2013	→ América Mineiro (loan)	0	(0)
2013–2021	1899 Hoffenheim	2	(0)
2014–2016	→ Lechia Gdańsk (loan)	36	(1)
2015–2016	→ Lechia Gdańsk II (loan)	7	(1)
2016	→ Cruzeiro (loan)	3	(0)
2017–2018	→ Guarani (loan)	39	(6)
2018–2019	→ Athletico Paranaense (loan)	23	(0)
2020–2021	→ Botafogo (loan)	46	(6)
2021	→ América Mineiro (loan)	11	(0)
2022	Vasco da Gama	5	(0)
2022	→ Juventude (loan)	12	(1)
2023–2024	Chapecoense	31	(8)
2024–	Henan FC	86	(24)
- * Club domestic league appearances and goals as of 8 November 2026

Bruno dos Santos Nazário (born 9 February 1995) is a Brazilian footballer who plays as an attacking midfielder for Chinese Super League club Henan FC.

== Club career ==
Born in Cascavel, Paraná, Nazário joined Figueirense's youth setup in 2010, after starting it out at hometown club FC Cascavel. He made his first team – and Série A – debut on 3 November 2012, coming on as a late substitute for Raphael Botti in a 0–1 away loss against Flamengo.

Nazário appeared in four matches during the year, as his side suffered relegation as dead last. He scored his first goal as a senior on 24 March 2013, netting the last in a 4–1 Campeonato Catarinense home routing of Metropolitano.

In May 2013, Nazário left Figueira, after having his federative rights negotiated to a group of investors. He subsequently joined Série B side América Mineiro, on loan from his parent club Tombense.

In August 2013, Nazário signed a four-year deal with German Bundesliga side 1899 Hoffenheim, for a rumoured fee of around €1 million. He made his debut in the category on 3 May 2014, replacing Tobias Strobl in a 2–3 away loss against Borussia Dortmund.

On 28 August 2014, after being rarely used, Nazário was loaned to Polish Ekstraklasa club Lechia Gdańsk for a year.

On 4 January 2016, he was loaned to Cruzeiro Esporte Clube.

=== Henan ===
On 9 February 2024, Nazário joined Chinese Super League club Henan. On 1 March 2024, he made his debut and scored his first goal for Henan in a 1–1 away draw against Qingdao West Coast.

== Career statistics ==
As of match played 8 November 2026

Club	Season	League			State League		Cup		Continental		Other		Total	
Club	Season	Division	Apps	Goals	Apps	Goals	Apps	Goals	Apps	Goals	Apps	Goals	Apps	Goals
Figueirense	2012	Série A	4	0	—		—		—		—		4	0
Figueirense	2013	Série B	—		4	1	0	0	—		—		4	1
Figueirense	Total		4	0	4	1	0	0	—		—		8	1
América Mineiro (loan)	2013	Série B	—		—		0	0	—		—		0	0
1899 Hoffenheim	2013–14	Bundesliga	2	0	—		0	0	—		—		2	0
Lechia Gdańsk (loan)	2014–15	Ekstraklasa	27	1	—		0	0	—		—		27	1
Lechia Gdańsk (loan)	2015–16	Ekstraklasa	9	0	—		1	0	—		—		10	0
Lechia Gdańsk (loan)	Total		36	1	—		1	0	—		—		37	1
Lechia Gdańsk II (loan)	2015–16	III liga	7	1	—		—		—		—		27	1
Cruzeiro (loan)	2016	Série A	3	0	1	0	1	0	—		—		5	0
Guarani (loan)	2017	Série B	32	4	15	3	—		—		—		37	7
Guarani (loan)	2018	Série B	7	2	16	6	—		—		—		23	8
Guarani (loan)	Total		39	6	31	9	—		—		—		60	15
Athletico Paranaense (loan)	2018	Série A	9	0	—		—		0	0	—		9	0
Athletico Paranaense (loan)	2019	Série A	14	0	—		4	0	2	0	—		20	0
Athletico Paranaense (loan)	Total		23	0	—		4	0	2	0	—		29	0
Botafogo (loan)	2020	Série A	26	1	10	4	8	1	—		—		44	6
Botafogo (loan)	2021	Série B	—		2	0	—		—		—		2	0
Botafogo (loan)	Total		26	1	12	4	8	1	—		—		46	6
América Mineiro (loan)	2021	Série A	11	0	8	1	3	0	—		—		22	1
Vasco da Gama	2022	Série A	5	0	11	1	1	1	—		—		17	2
Juventude (loan)	2022	Série A	12	1	—		—		—		—		12	1
Chapecoense	2023	Série B	31	8	13	2	1	0	—		—		45	10
Henan FC	2024	Chinese Super League	30	9	—		2	0	—		—		32	9
Henan FC	2025	Chinese Super League	29	5	—		5	0	—		—		34	5
Henan FC	2026	Chinese Super League	27	10	—		1	0	—		—		28	10
Henan FC	Total		86	24	—		8	0	—		—		94	24
Career total			355	42	80	18	27	2	2	0	0	0	464	52

== Honours ==
Guarani

- Campeonato Paulista Série A2: 2018

Athletico Paranaense

- Copa Sudamericana: 2018
- J.League Cup / Copa Sudamericana Championship: 2019
