= Guancheng, Zhengzhou =

Guancheng 管城回族区 · قُوًاچْع خُوِذُو ٿُو
- District
- Guancheng Hui District
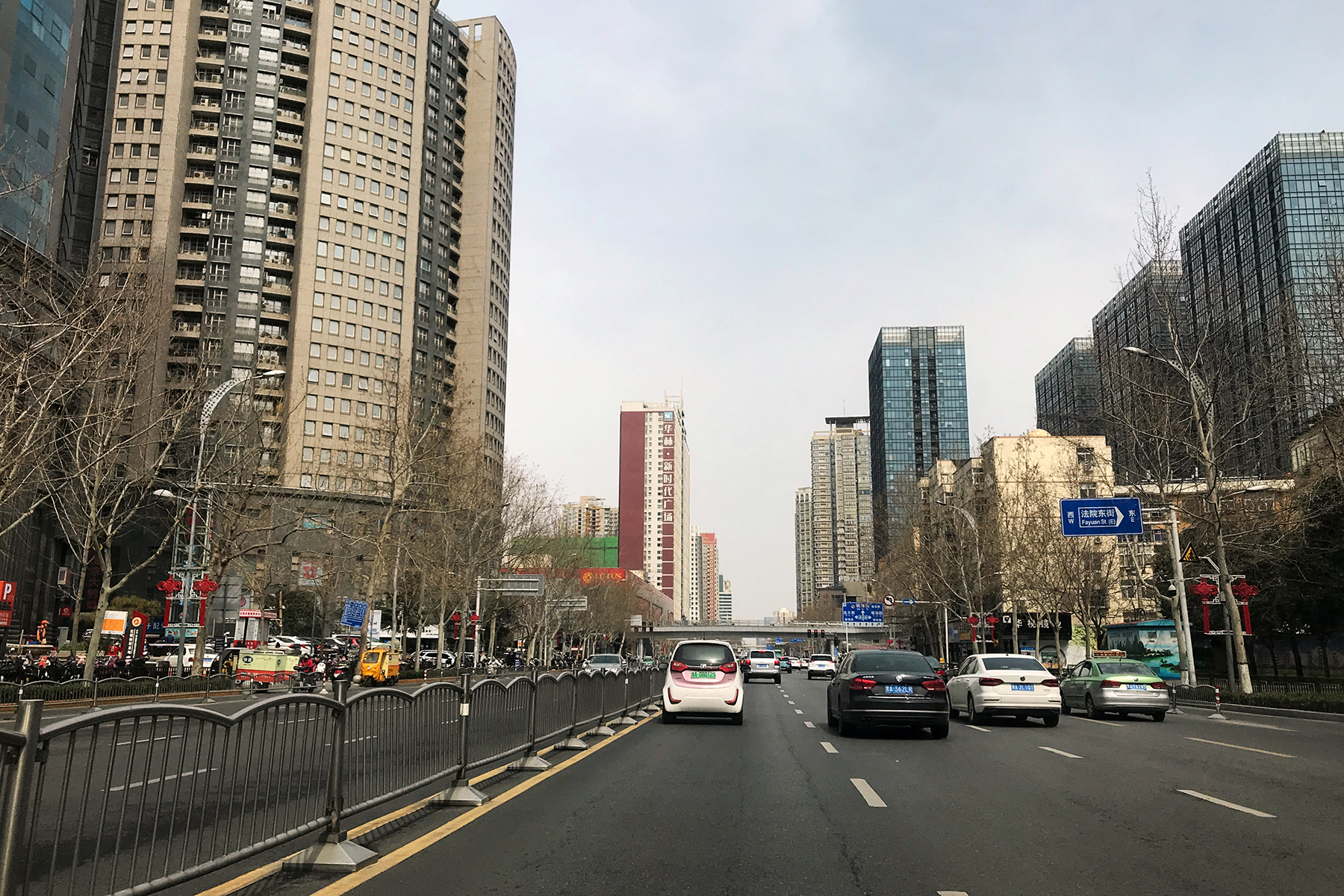
- Zijingshan Road

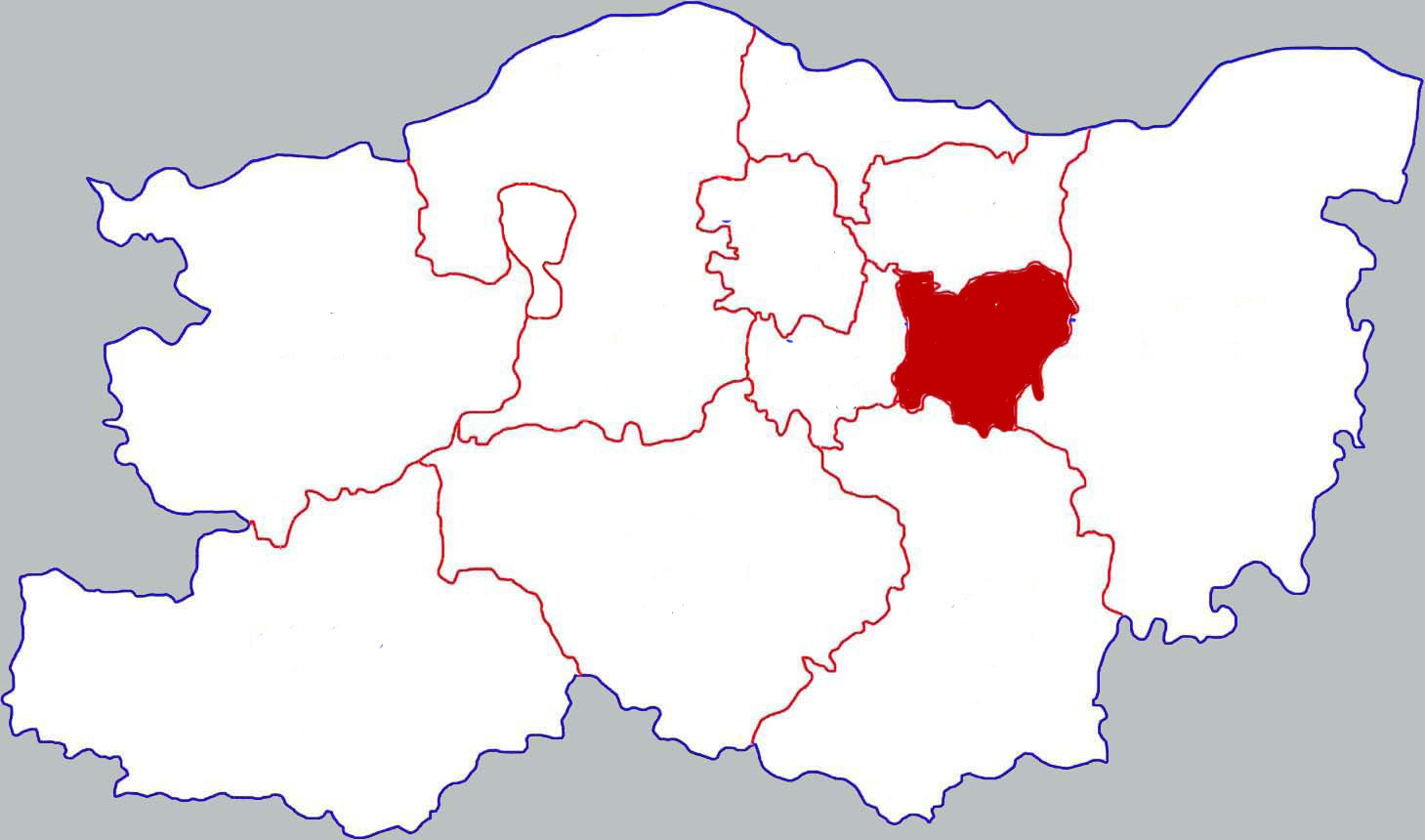
- Location in Zhengzhou

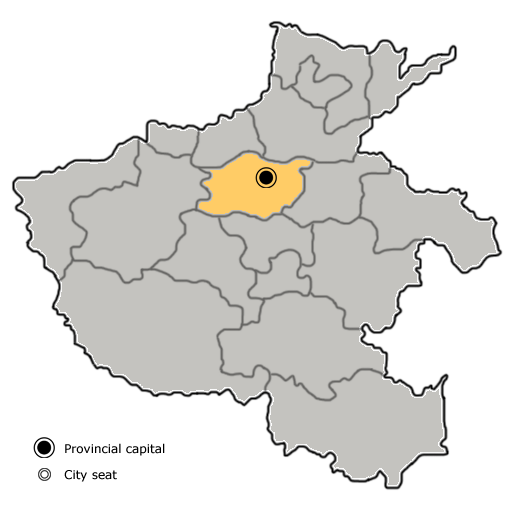
- Zhengzhou in Henan
- Coordinates (Guancheng government): 34°45′16″N 113°40′39″E
- Country: People's Republic of China
- Province: Henan
- Prefecture-level city: Zhengzhou

Area
  - Total: 204 km^{2} (79 sq mi)

Population (2019)
  - Total: 835,700
  - Density: 4,100/km^{2} (10,600/sq mi)
- Time zone: UTC+8 (China Standard)
- Postal code: 450000
- Website: www.zzguancheng.gov.cn

Guancheng District (Chinese: 管城区; pinyin: Guǎnchéng Qū), or Guancheng Hui District (Chinese: 管城回族区; pinyin: Guǎnchéng Huízú Qū; Xiao'erjing: قُوًاچْع خُوِذُو ٿُو), is one of 6 built-up or urban districts of the prefecture-level city of Zhengzhou, the capital of Henan Province, China.

== History ==
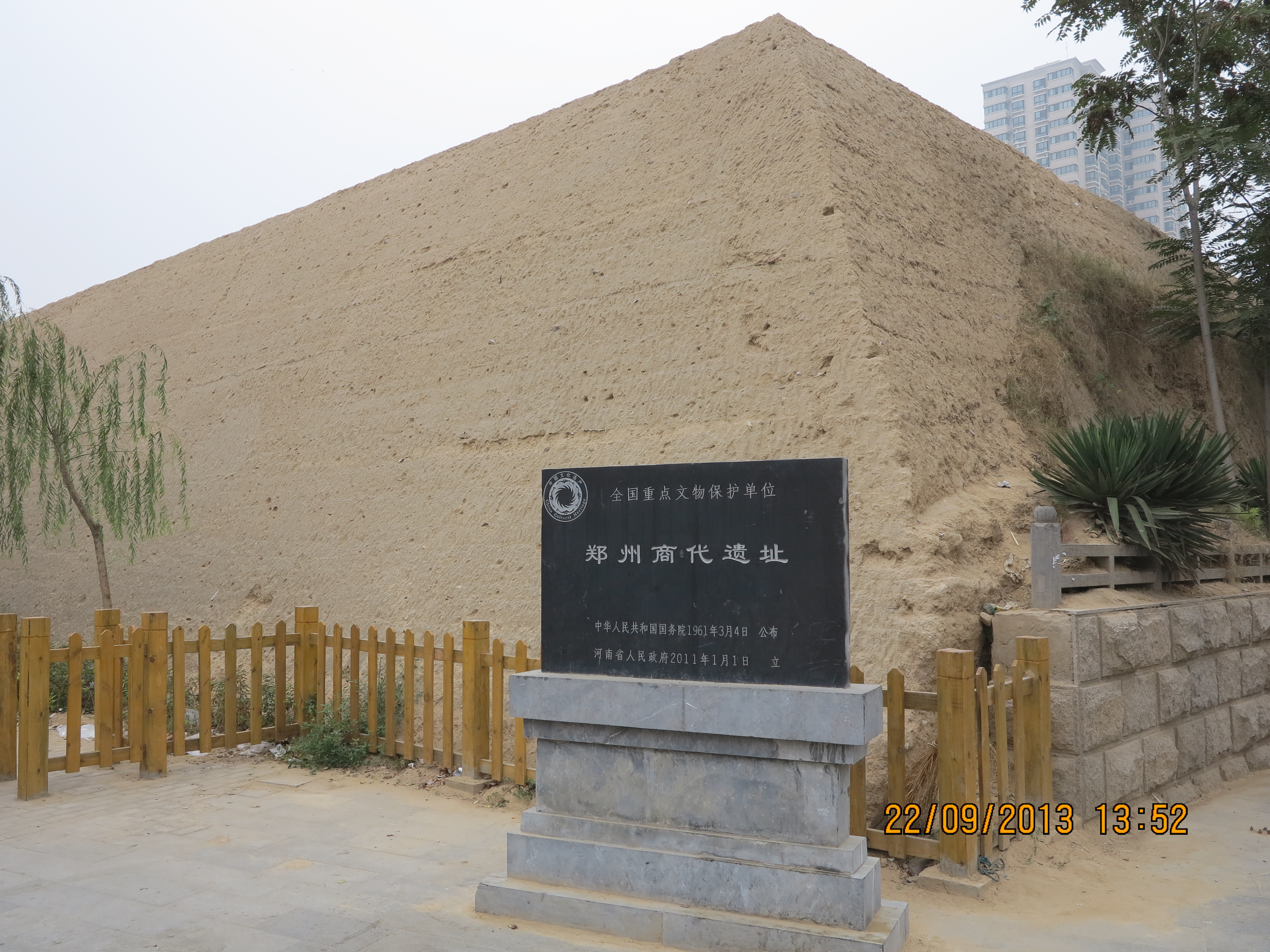
Ruins at Shang Dynasty City

The ancient Shang Dynasty city of Ao existed within the location of the present-day Guancheng Hui District. Dating back to sometime between 1600 BCE and 1100 BCE, the location of Ao's ruins now lie within Shang City Park.

The city of Zhengzhou was captured by the People's Liberation Army in 1948.

In 1958, Guancheng Hui District was established after the merger of Longhai District (Chinese: 陇海区) and Jinshui Hui District (Chinese: 金水回族区).

In May 1966, Guancheng Hui District was re-designated as Xiangyang District (Chinese: 向阳区). Along with the district's name change, various subdistricts within it were renamed.

In November 1981, it was re-designated as Xiangyang Hui District (Chinese: 向阳回族区).

In 1983, the district returned to its original name, Guancheng Hui District, which it remains named as today. Various subdistricts within the district which were renamed during the Cultural Revolution reverted to their original names.

== Geography ==
Guancheng Hui District has an elevation ranging from about 100 metres (330 ft) to 140 metres (460 ft) above sea level.

A number of rivers flow through the district, including the Xiong'er River, the Qili River, the Chao River, and the Shibali River, which are all tributaries of the larger Huai River.

== Administrative divisions ==
The Guancheng Hui District administers 13 subdistricts, and 1 township. The district government is located within the Beixia Street Subdistrict.

=== Subdistricts ===
The following 13 subdistricts are located within the district:

- Beixia Street Subdistrict
- West Avenue Subdistrict
- Nanguan Street Subdistrict
- Chengdong Road Subdistrict
- East Avenue Subdistrict
- Erligang Subdistrict
- Longhai Street Subdistrict
- Zijingshannan Road Subdistrict
- Hanghaidong Road Subdistrict
- Shibalihe Subdistrict
- Nancao Subdistrict
- Jindai Subdistrict
- Shangdu Road Subdistrict

=== Township ===
The district's sole township is Putian Township.

== Demographics ==
The district has a sizable Hui population, which totals about 23,000 people.

== Cultural Sites ==
The district is home to a number of cultural sites, many of which date back hundreds of years. The famous Zhengzhou Shang City ruins, which possibly date back to sometime between 1600 BCE and 1100 BCE, lie within the district. The Beidajie Mosque, which possibly dates back to the Ming Dynasty, and continues to serve as a cultural center for the city's Muslim population, is located within the Beixia Street Subdistrict. The mosque is both the oldest and largest in Zhengzhou. The Zhengzhou Chenghuang Temple, which dates back to the Ming Dynasty, also lies within the district.

A number of historically significant streets, such as Guancheng Street, East Avenue, and Shuyuan Street, lie within the district.

The Zhongyuan Tower, a 388-meter-tall (1,273 ft) steel skyscraper, is also located within the district.

== Economy ==
Yutong has its headquarters in the Yutong Industrial Park (Chinese: 宇通工业园) in the district.

Guancheng Hui District is home to a sizable gold and jewelry industry, which accounts for transactions worth ¥20 billion annually. This comprises over 60% of the total industry in Zhengzhou.

== Transportation ==
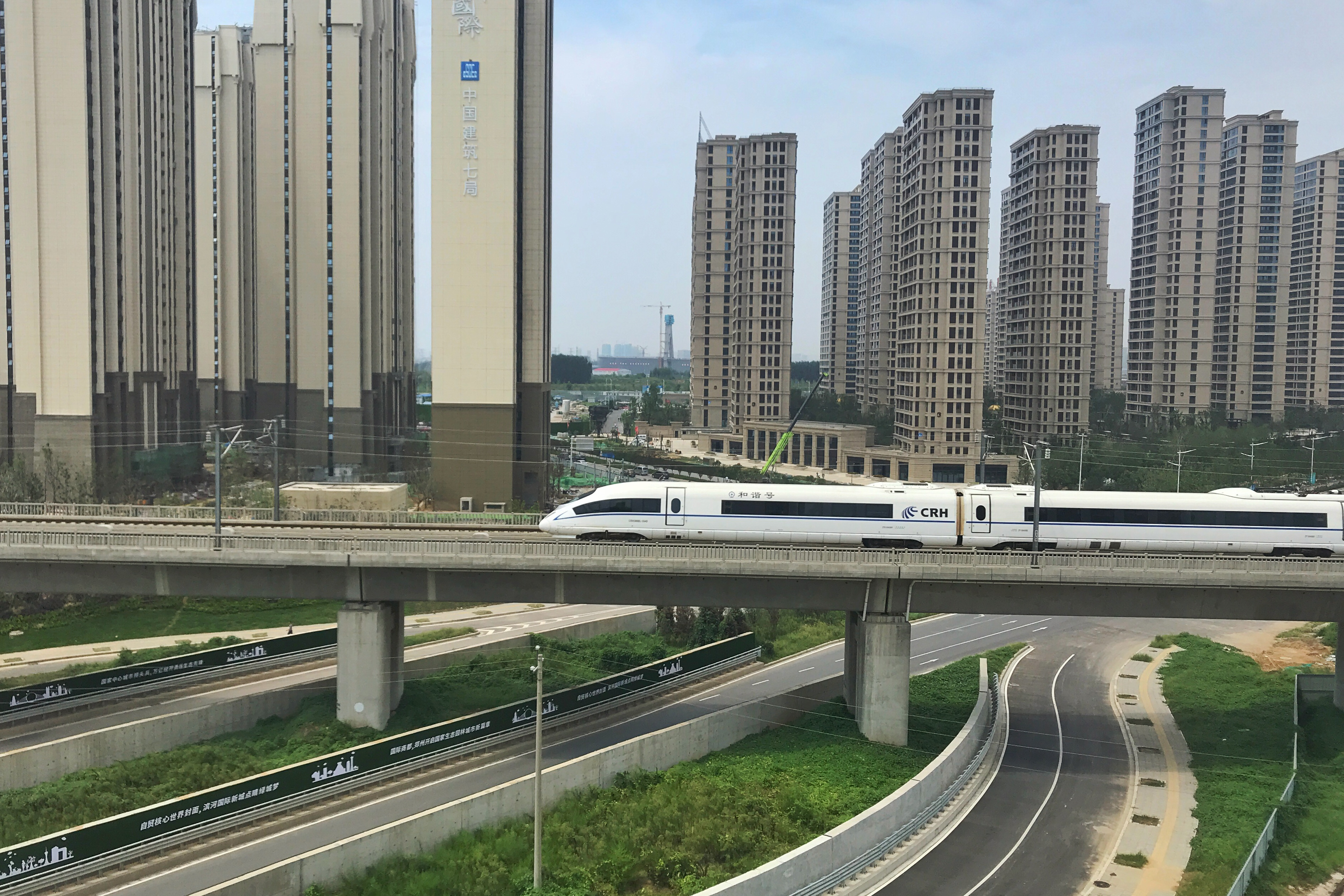
A train on the Beijing–Guangzhou high-speed railway

National Highway 107 and National Highway 310 both pass through Guancheng Hui District.

The Longhai Railway and the Beijing–Guangzhou railway both pass through the district. The Zhengzhou East railway station is located in the district.
