= Peng Shunjie =

Chinese footballer (born 2007)

Personal information
- Date of birth: 3 July 2007 (age 19)
- Place of birth: Dalian, Liaoning, China
- Height: 1.84 m (6 ft 0 in)
- Position: Defender

Team information
- Current team: Dalian Yingbo
- Number: 5

Youth career
- 2019–2023: Dalian Pro

Senior career*
Years	Team	Apps	(Gls)
2025–	Dalian Yingbo	4	(0)
2026–	→ Dalian Yingbo B (res.)	6	(0)

International career^{‡}
2026–	China U19	1	(0)
- * Club domestic league appearances and goals as of 19 November 2026 ‡ National team caps and goals as of 26 June 2026

Peng Shunjie (simplified Chinese: 彭顺杰; traditional Chinese: 彭順傑; pinyin: Péng Shùnjié; born 3 July 2007) is a Chinese professional footballer who plays as a defender for Chinese Super League club Dalian Yingbo.

== Early life and youth career ==
Peng was born on 3 July 2007 in Dalian, Liaoning. He began his football training at Dongbeilu Primary School in Dalian. From 2019 to 2023, he received systematic training in the youth system of Dalian Professional. In 2024, he joined the Dalian Football Association youth team.

== Club career ==
=== Dalian Yingbo ===
On 22 July 2025, Dalian Yingbo officially announced that Peng Shunjie had been promoted from the U19 to the first team. He was assigned the squad number 5.

On 6 May 2026, Peng made his Chinese Super League debut, coming on as a substitute in the 74th minute for Bi Jinhao in a 3–0 away defeat to Beijing Guoan. On 10 May 2026, he appeared as a substitute again, replacing Mamadou Traoré in the 87th minute of a 3–1 away loss to Qingdao Hainiu.

=== Dalian Yingbo B ===
In 2025, Peng helped Dalian Yingbo U21 win the 2025 Chinese Youth Football Elite League (Division U-21) and secure promotion to China League Two. In 2026, the team competed as Dalian Yingbo B in the China League Two. On 24 April 2026, he started in a 2–2 home draw against Changchun Xidu. On 29 April 2026, he started in a 0–2 away defeat to Shanxi Chongde Ronghai.

== International career ==
In May 2026, Peng was called up to the China U19 national team for the 52nd Maurice Revello Tournament (Toulon Tournament) in France. He started in the second group match against DR Congo U23, playing 45 minutes in a 0–3 defeat. During his time on the pitch, he completed 2 tackles, 1 clearance, and 13 passes with 2 long passes, all successful.

== Career statistics ==
=== Club ===
As of 26 June 2026

Appearances and goals by club, season and competition
Club	Season	League			National Cup		Continental		Other		Total	
Club	Season	Division	Apps	Goals	Apps	Goals	Apps	Goals	Apps	Goals	Apps	Goals
Dalian Yingbo	2025	Chinese Super League	1	0	0	0	—		—		1	0
Dalian Yingbo	2026	Chinese Super League	2	0	0	0	—		—		2	0
Dalian Yingbo B	2026	China League Two	2	0	0	0	—		—		2	0
Career total			5	0	0	0	0	0	0	0	5	0

== Honours ==
Dalian U18

- Liaoning Little Tiger Cup: 2024

Dalian Yingbo U21

- Chinese Football Association U21 League: 2025
