= 2025 EAFF E-1 Football Championship Final squads =

The following is a list of squads for each nation competing in the 2025 EAFF E-1 Football Championship, held from 7 to 15 July in the cities of Yongin, South Korea. Each nation needed to submit a squad of 26 players, including 3 goalkeepers.

Age, caps and goals as of one day previous to the start of the tournament, 5 July 2025.

== China ==
Head coach: (Serbia) Dejan Đurđević (caretaker)

No.	Pos.	Player	Date of birth (age)	Caps	Goals	Club
1	GK	Yan Junling	28 January 1991 (age 35)	57	0	(Chinese Football Association) Shanghai Port
12	GK	Xue Qinghao	26 September 2000 (age 26)	0	0	(Chinese Football Association) Shanghai Shenhua
26	GK	Yu Jinyong	6 July 2004 (age 22)	0	0	(Chinese Football Association) Shandong Taishan
2	DF	Liu Haofan	23 October 2003 (age 22)	0	0	(Chinese Football Association) Zhejiang FC
3	DF	Gao Zhunyi	21 August 1995 (age 31)	19	0	(Chinese Football Association) Shandong Taishan
4	DF	Jiang Shenglong	24 December 2000 (age 25)	18	0	(Chinese Football Association) Shanghai Shenhua
5	DF	Zhu Chenjie	23 August 2000 (age 26)	35	1	(Chinese Football Association) Shanghai Shenhua
13	DF	Wei Zhen	12 February 1997 (age 29)	6	0	(Chinese Football Association) Shanghai Port
24	DF	Wang Shiqin	24 June 2003 (age 23)	0	0	(Chinese Football Association) Zhejiang FC
25	DF	Umidjan Yusup	28 February 2004 (age 22)	0	0	(Chinese Football Association) Shanghai Port
6	MF	Huang Zhengyu	24 January 1997 (age 29)	4	0	(Chinese Football Association) Shandong Taishan
7	MF	Xu Haoyang	15 January 1999 (age 27)	9	0	(Chinese Football Association) Shanghai Shenhua
8	MF	Xu Xin	19 April 1994 (age 32)	16	1	(Chinese Football Association) Shanghai Port
11	MF	Serginho	15 March 1995 (age 31)	3	0	(Chinese Football Association) Beijing Guoan
14	MF	Gao Tianyi	1 July 1998 (age 28)	6	0	(Chinese Football Association) Shanghai Shenhua
16	MF	Ba Dun	16 September 1995 (age 31)	3	1	(Chinese Football Association) Tianjin Jinmen Tiger
17	MF	Kuai Jiwen	28 February 2006 (age 20)	0	0	(Chinese Football Association) Shanghai Port
18	MF	Liao Jintao	24 February 2000 (age 26)	0	0	(Chinese Football Association) Dalian Yingbo
19	MF	Cao Yongjing	15 February 1997 (age 29)	5	0	(Chinese Football Association) Beijing Guoan
23	MF	Xie Wenneng	6 February 2001 (age 25)	10	1	(Chinese Football Association) Shandong Taishan
9	FW	Zhang Yuning (captain)	5 January 1997 (age 29)	42	8	(Chinese Football Association) Beijing Guoan
10	FW	Wei Shihao	8 April 1995 (age 31)	37	4	(Chinese Football Association) Chengdu Rongcheng
15	FW	Wang Yudong	23 November 2006 (age 19)	4	1	(Chinese Football Association) Zhejiang FC
20	FW	Wang Ziming	5 August 1996 (age 30)	10	0	(Chinese Football Association) Beijing Guoan
21	FW	Tao Qianglong	20 November 2001 (age 24)	2	0	(Chinese Football Association) Zhejiang FC
22	FW	Liu Chengyu	2 July 2006 (age 20)	2	0	(Chinese Football Association) Shanghai Shenhua

== Hong Kong ==
Head coach: (England) Ashley Westwood

No.	Pos.	Player	Date of birth (age)	Caps	Goals	Club
1	GK	Yapp Hung Fai (captain)	21 March 1990 (age 36)	106	0	(Football Association of Hong Kong, China) Eastern
18	GK	Tse Ka Wing	4 September 1999 (age 27)	7	0	(Football Association of Hong Kong, China) Tai Po
19	GK	Oleksii Shliakotin	2 September 1989 (age 37)	0	0	Free agent
2	DF	Tsui Wang Kit (Note: Clement Benhaddouche replaced Tsui Wang Kit after two matches, as Tsui was unavailable due to injury and consequently not listed on the player roster.)	5 January 1997 (age 29)	28	1	(Chinese Football Association) Yunnan Yukun
2	DF	Clement Benhaddouche	11 May 1996 (age 30)	0	0	Free agent
3	DF	Oliver Gerbig	12 December 1998 (age 27)	21	0	(Chinese Football Association) Henan
4	DF	Leon Jones	28 February 1998 (age 28)	12	1	Free agent
5	DF	Dudu	17 April 1990 (age 36)	2	1	(Football Association of Hong Kong, China) Lee Man
17	DF	Shinichi Chan	5 September 2002 (age 24)	26	1	(Chinese Football Association) Shanghai Shenhua
21	DF	Yue Tze Nam	12 May 1998 (age 28)	32	0	(Chinese Football Association) Meizhou Hakka
22	DF	Nicholas Benavides	5 November 2001 (age 24)	4	2	(Football Association of Hong Kong, China) Tai Po
23	DF	Sun Ming Him	19 June 2000 (age 26)	36	2	(Chinese Football Association) Tianjin Jinmen Tiger
26	DF	Lee Ka Ho	26 April 1993 (age 33)	0	0	(Football Association of Hong Kong, China) Tai Po
6	MF	Tan Chun Lok	15 January 1996 (age 30)	52	3	(Football Association of Hong Kong, China) Kitchee
8	MF	Ngan Cheuk Pan	22 January 1998 (age 28)	14	0	Free agent
10	MF	Wong Wai	17 September 1992 (age 34)	55	6	(Football Association of Hong Kong, China) Lee Man
12	MF	Fernando	14 November 1986 (age 39)	19	1	Free agent
16	MF	Chan Siu Kwan	1 August 1992 (age 34)	31	6	(Football Association of Hong Kong, China) Tai Po
25	MF	Sohgo Ichikawa	30 July 2004 (age 22)	2	0	(Football Association of Hong Kong, China) Southern
7	FW	Juninho	11 December 1990 (age 35)	17	2	(Football Association of Hong Kong, China) Kitchee
9	FW	Matt Orr	1 January 1997 (age 29)	37	9	(Chinese Football Association) Shenzhen Peng City
11	FW	Lau Ka Kiu	10 February 2002 (age 24)	1	0	(Football Association of Hong Kong, China) Lee Man
13	FW	Stefan Pereira	16 April 1988 (age 38)	16	1	(Football Association of Hong Kong, China) Southern
14	FW	Raphaël Merkies	15 April 2002 (age 24)	3	1	(Chinese Football Association) Shandong Taishan
15	FW	Mahama Awal	10 June 1991 (age 35)	12	0	(Football Association of Hong Kong, China) Southern
20	FW	Michael Udebuluzor	1 April 2004 (age 22)	16	2	(German Football Association) VfR Mannheim
24	FW	Ng Yu Hei	13 February 2006 (age 20)	6	0	(Chinese Football Association) Chongqing Tonglianglong

== Japan ==
Head coach: Hajime Moriyasu

No.	Pos.	Player	Date of birth (age)	Caps	Goals	Club
1	GK	Keisuke Ōsako	28 July 1999 (age 27)	9	0	(Japan Football Association) Sanfrecce Hiroshima
12	GK	Tomoki Hayakawa	3 March 1999 (age 27)	0	0	(Japan Football Association) Kashima Antlers
23	GK	Alexandre Pisano	10 January 2006 (age 20)	0	0	(Japan Football Association) Nagoya Grampus
3	DF	Hayato Araki	7 August 1996 (age 30)	1	0	(Japan Football Association) Sanfrecce Hiroshima
4	DF	Taiyo Koga	28 October 1998 (age 27)	1	0	(Japan Football Association) Kashiwa Reysol
5	DF	Yūto Nagatomo (captain)	12 September 1986 (age 40)	142	4	(Japan Football Association) FC Tokyo
16	DF	Tomoya Ando	10 January 1999 (age 27)	0	0	(Japan Football Association) Avispa Fukuoka
22	DF	Naomichi Ueda	24 October 1994 (age 31)	16	1	(Japan Football Association) Kashima Antlers
25	DF	Yuto Tsunashima	15 August 2000 (age 26)	0	0	(Japan Football Association) Tokyo Verdy
2	MF	Henry Heroki Mochizuki	20 September 2001 (age 25)	0	0	(Japan Football Association) Machida Zelvia
6	MF	Hayao Kawabe	8 September 1995 (age 31)	6	1	(Japan Football Association) Sanfrecce Hiroshima
7	MF	Yūki Sōma (vice-captain)	25 February 1997 (age 29)	14	5	(Japan Football Association) Machida Zelvia
8	MF	Satoshi Tanaka	13 August 2002 (age 24)	0	0	(Japan Football Association) Sanfrecce Hiroshima
14	MF	Yuto Ozeki	6 February 2005 (age 21)	0	0	(Japan Football Association) Kawasaki Frontale
15	MF	Sho Inagaki	25 December 1991 (age 34)	1	2	(Japan Football Association) Nagoya Grampus
17	MF	Zento Uno	20 November 2003 (age 22)	0	0	(Japan Football Association) Shimizu S-Pulse
20	MF	Kōta Tawaratsumida	14 May 2004 (age 22)	2	0	(Japan Football Association) FC Tokyo
21	MF	Ryūnosuke Satō	16 October 2006 (age 19)	1	0	(Japan Football Association) Fagiano Okayama
24	MF	Tojiro Kubo	5 April 1999 (age 27)	0	0	(Japan Football Association) Kashiwa Reysol
26	MF	Sōta Nakamura	15 October 2002 (age 23)	0	0	(Japan Football Association) Sanfrecce Hiroshima
9	FW	Taisei Miyashiro	26 May 2000 (age 26)	0	0	(Japan Football Association) Vissel Kobe
10	FW	Mao Hosoya	7 September 2001 (age 25)	7	2	(Japan Football Association) Kashiwa Reysol
11	FW	Taichi Hara	5 May 1999 (age 27)	0	0	(Japan Football Association) Kyoto Sanga
13	FW	Ryo Germain	19 April 1995 (age 31)	0	0	(Japan Football Association) Sanfrecce Hiroshima
18	FW	Shin Yamada	30 May 2000 (age 26)	0	0	(Japan Football Association) Kawasaki Frontale
19	FW	Yuki Kakita	14 July 1997 (age 29)	0	0	(Japan Football Association) Kashiwa Reysol

== South Korea ==
Head coach: Hong Myung-bo

No.	Pos.	Player	Date of birth (age)	Caps	Goals	Club
1	GK	Lee Chang-geun	30 August 1993 (age 33)	2	0	(Korea Football Association) Daejeon Hana Citizen
12	GK	Kim Dong-heon	3 March 1997 (age 29)	0	0	(Korea Football Association) Incheon United
21	GK	Jo Hyeon-woo (captain)	25 September 1991 (age 35)	42	0	(Korea Football Association) Ulsan HD
2	DF	Cho Hyun-taek	2 August 2001 (age 25)	0	0	(Korea Football Association) Ulsan HD
3	DF	Lee Tae-seok	28 July 2002 (age 24)	5	0	(Korea Football Association) Pohang Steelers
4	DF	Kim Ju-sung	12 December 2000 (age 25)	3	0	(Korea Football Association) FC Seoul
14	DF	Park Seung-wook	7 May 1997 (age 29)	3	0	(Korea Football Association) Pohang Steelers
15	DF	Kim Moon-hwan	1 August 1995 (age 31)	28	0	(Korea Football Association) Daejeon Hana Citizen
16	DF	Seo Myung-gwan	23 November 2002 (age 23)	0	0	(Korea Football Association) Ulsan HD
22	DF	Kim Tae-hyun	19 December 1996 (age 29)	0	0	(Korea Football Association) Jeonbuk Hyundai Motors
24	DF	Byeon Jun-soo	30 November 2001 (age 24)	0	0	(Korea Football Association) Gwangju FC
26	DF	Kim Tae-hyeon	17 September 2000 (age 26)	0	0	(Japan Football Association) Kashima Antlers
5	MF	Park Jin-seob (vice-captain)	23 October 1995 (age 30)	6	1	(Korea Football Association) Jeonbuk Hyundai Motors
6	MF	Kim Jin-gyu	24 February 1997 (age 29)	9	3	(Korea Football Association) Jeonbuk Hyundai Motors
7	MF	Na Sang-ho	12 August 1996 (age 30)	28	2	(Japan Football Association) Machida Zelvia
8	MF	Kim Bong-soo	26 December 1999 (age 26)	0	0	(Korea Football Association) Daejeon Hana Citizen
10	MF	Lee Dong-gyeong	20 September 1997 (age 29)	10	1	(Korea Football Association) Gimcheon Sangmu
11	MF	Moon Seon-min	9 June 1992 (age 34)	18	2	(Korea Football Association) FC Seoul
13	MF	Kang Sang-yoon	31 May 2004 (age 22)	0	0	(Korea Football Association) Jeonbuk Hyundai Motors
17	MF	Jeong Seung-won	27 February 1997 (age 29)	0	0	(Korea Football Association) FC Seoul
20	MF	Lee Seung-won	6 March 2003 (age 23)	0	0	(Korea Football Association) Gimcheon Sangmu
23	MF	Seo Min-woo	12 March 1998 (age 28)	0	0	(Korea Football Association) Gangwon FC
25	MF	Mo Jae-hyeon	24 September 1996 (age 30)	0	0	(Korea Football Association) Gangwon FC
9	FW	Joo Min-kyu	13 April 1990 (age 36)	9	2	(Korea Football Association) Daejeon Hana Citizen
18	FW	Lee Ho-jae	14 October 2000 (age 25)	0	0	(Korea Football Association) Pohang Steelers
19	FW	Oh Se-hun	15 January 1999 (age 27)	9	2	(Japan Football Association) Machida Zelvia
