= Yu Jinyong =

Chinese footballer (born 2004)

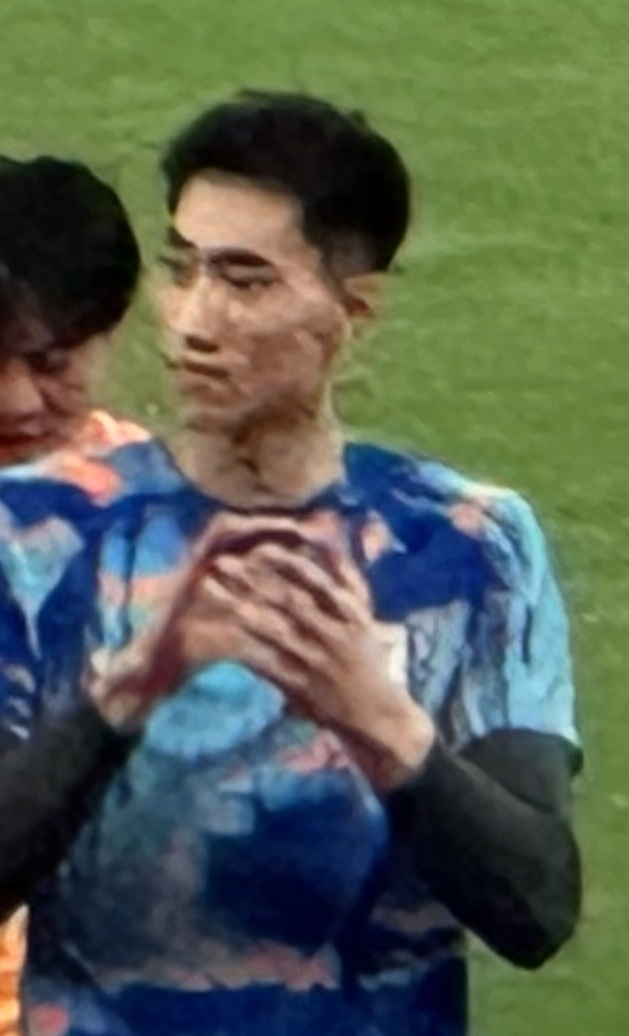
- Yu Jinyong in August 2024

Personal information
- Full name: Yu Jinyong
- Date of birth: 6 July 2004 (age 22)
- Place of birth: Shenyang, Liaoning, China
- Height: 2.00 m (6 ft 7 in)
- Position: Goalkeeper

Team information
- Current team: Shandong Taishan
- Number: 1

Youth career
- –2021: Shandong Taishan

Senior career*
Years	Team	Apps	(Gls)
2021–	Shandong Taishan	16	(0)

International career^{‡}
2023–2026	China U23	12	(0)
Medal record
Representing China
Men's football
EAFF Championship
Third place	2025 South Korea	Team
Asian Games
Bronze medal – third place	2026 Aichi–Nagoya	Team
- * Club domestic league appearances and goals as of 19 November 2026 ‡ National team caps and goals as of 12 November 2025

Yu Jinyong (Chinese: 于金永; pinyin: Yú Jīnyǒng; born 6 July 2004) is a Chinese professional footballer who plays as a goalkeeper for Chinese Super League club Shandong Taishan, and the China under-23 national team.

== Club career ==
Yu Jinyong was born on 6 July 2004 in Shenyang, Liaoning, and went through the Shandong Taishan youth academy.

In 2021, as a 16-year-old, Yu Jinyong was named in Shandong Taishan's 35-man squad for the upcoming 2021 Chinese Super League season. He failed to make a single appearance during the season, but followed the team to a Chinese Super League title, the club's first in eleven years.

In August 2023, Yu Jinyong went on trial to Belgian club Royal Charleroi under the recommendation of then-teammate Marouane Fellaini, who dubbed him as a "little Courtois", but he had since returned to China.

On 17 July 2024, Yu Jinyong made his professional and senior debut in a 2024 Chinese FA Cup tie against Qingdao West Coast. On 13 September, he made his Chinese Super League debut, starting in the 1−0 home loss against Qingdao West Coast.

== International career ==
Yu Jinyong was part of the China U20 squad that competed in the 2023 AFC U-20 Asian Cup, where his role had been a back-up goalkeeper.

On 5 April 2024, he was named in China's final squad of the 2024 AFC U-23 Asian Cup. On 16 April 2024, in China's first group stage match against Japan, he came on as a substitute for Duan Dezhi in the 88th minute of the game as a striker. In a post-match interview, China U23 head coach Cheng Yaodong claimed that the substitution had previously been envisioned in his tactics.

== Personal life ==
Yu Jinyong was born to his father Yu Ming, a former Liaoning and Chinese international footballer, and his mother, Hu Jie, a Chinese former volleyball player.

== Career statistics ==
=== Club ===
As of match played 5 September 2026

Appearances and goals by club, season, and competition
Club	Season	League			Cup		Continental		Other		Total	
Club	Season	Division	Apps	Goals	Apps	Goals	Apps	Goals	Apps	Goals	Apps	Goals
Shandong Taishan	2021	Chinese Super League	0	0	0	0	–		–		0	0
Shandong Taishan	2022	Chinese Super League	0	0	0	0	0 (Note: Appearances in AFC Champions League)	0	–		0	0
Shandong Taishan	2023	Chinese Super League	0	0	0	0	0	0	0 (Note: Appearances in Chinese FA Super Cup)	0	0	0
Shandong Taishan	2024	Chinese Super League	1	0	1	0	0 (Note: Appearances in AFC Champions League Elite)	0	–		2	0
Shandong Taishan	2025	Chinese Super League	7	0	0	0	–		–		7	0
Shandong Taishan	2026	Chinese Super League	8	0	2	0	–		–		10	0
Shandong Taishan	Total		16	0	3	0	0	0	0	0	19	0
Career total			16	0	3	0	0	0	0	0	19	0

== Honours ==
Shandong Taishan

- Chinese Super League: 2021
- Chinese FA Cup: 2021, 2022
