= Luo Jing (footballer) =

Chinese footballer

Luo Jing 罗竞
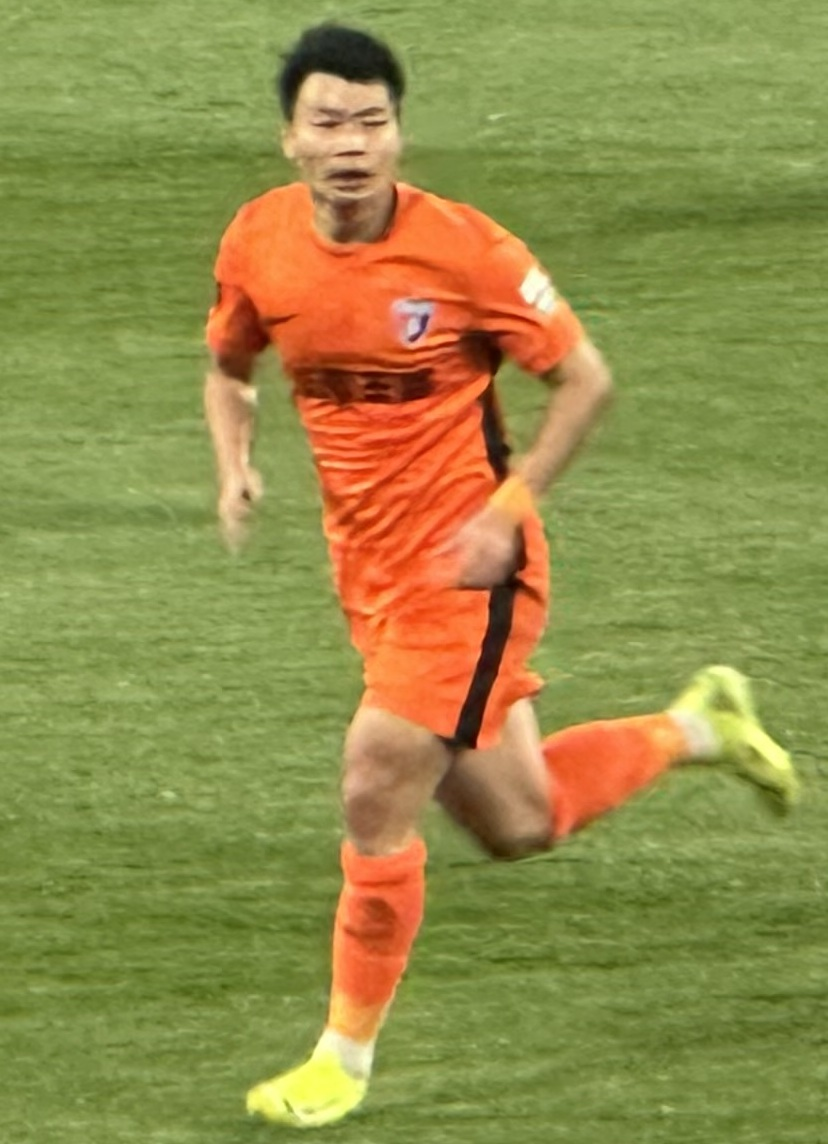
- Luo Jing in May 2025

Personal information
- Full name: Luo Jing
- Date of birth: 14 November 1993 (age 33)
- Place of birth: Guiyang, Guizhou, China
- Height: 1.82 m (5 ft 11 1/2 in)
- Position: Midfielder

Team information
- Current team: Dalian Yingbo
- Number: 7

Youth career
- 2001–2006: Shenzhen Yantian Sports School
- 2006–2011: Hangzhou Greentown
- 2011–2012: Alverca

Senior career*
Years	Team	Apps	(Gls)
2011	Wenzhou Provenza	14	(2)
2012–2013	Oliveirense	0	(0)
2012–2013	→ Casa Pia (loan)	9	(1)
2013–2018	Hangzhou Greentown	86	(5)
2019–2020	Jiangsu Suning	39	(1)
2021–2023	Cangzhou Mighty Lions	9	(1)
2023	Wuhan Three Towns	11	(0)
2024–2025	Yunnan Yukun	52	(7)
2026–	Dalian Yingbo	28	(4)
- * Club domestic league appearances and goals as of 19 November 2026

Luo Jing (Chinese: 罗竞; born 14 November 1993 in Guiyang) is a Chinese professional footballer who plays for Dalian Yingbo.

== Club career ==
Luo Jing joined Hangzhou Greentown youth team system from Shenzhen Yantian Sports School in 2006. He became one of players in the football star project and went to Portugal for football training in 2011. After training with Alverca for half year, he signed a contract with Oliveirense in the summer of 2012 and then was loaned to Terceira Divisão side Casa Pia for 2012/13 season. In July 2013, Luo returned to Hangzhou Greentown and was promoted to the first team squad. On 21 September 2013, he made his Super League debut in a game against Wuhan Zall that saw Hangzhou 1–1, coming on as a substitute for Gao Di in the 55th minute. On 26 April 2014, he scored his first goal for Hangzhou, which ensured Hangzhou tied with Jiangsu Sainty 2–2. Luo scored two goals in twenty-one appearances in the 2014 season and was named as the young player of the year by Hangzhou Greentown. He was sent to the Greentown reserved team in 2018.

On 16 February 2019, Luo transferred to Super League side Jiangsu Suning, signing a four-year contract. He would make his debut in a league game on 31 March 2019, against Wuhan Zall in 2-1 defeat. He would go on to establish himself as a regular within the team and in the following season he would win the clubs first league title with them. His time at the club would end when the clubs owners were in financial difficulties and dissolved the team. He would go on to join top tier club Cangzhou Mighty Lions on 2 April 2021 in a free transfer. Luo would go on to make his debut in a league game on 31 December 2021 against Dalian Professional in a 2-0 victory.

On 22 January 2026, Luo transferred to Super League side Dalian Yingbo.

== Career statistics ==
As of match played 31 December 2025.

Appearances and goals by club, season and competition
Club	Season	League			National Cup		Continental		Other		Total	
Club	Season	Division	Apps	Goals	Apps	Goals	Apps	Goals	Apps	Goals	Apps	Goals
Wenzhou Provenza	2011	China League Two	14	2	–		–		–		14	2
Casa Pia (loan)	2012/13	Terceira Divisão	9	1	0	0	–		–		9	1
Hangzhou Greentown	2013	Chinese Super League	2	0	0	0	–		–		2	0
Hangzhou Greentown	2014	Chinese Super League	21	2	2	0	–		–		23	2
Hangzhou Greentown	2015	Chinese Super League	18	1	2	1	–		–		20	2
Hangzhou Greentown	2016	Chinese Super League	17	1	2	1	–		–		19	2
Hangzhou Greentown	2017	China League One	28	1	3	2	–		–		31	3
Hangzhou Greentown	2018	China League One	0	0	0	0	–		–		0	0
Hangzhou Greentown	Total		86	5	9	4	0	0	0	0	95	9
Jiangsu Suning	2019	Chinese Super League	22	0	2	1	–		–		24	1
Jiangsu Suning	2020	Chinese Super League	17	1	6	0	–		–		23	1
Jiangsu Suning	Total		39	1	8	1	0	0	0	0	47	2
Cangzhou Mighty Lions	2021	Chinese Super League	2	0	0	0	–		–		2	0
Cangzhou Mighty Lions	2022	Chinese Super League	7	1	4	2	–		–		11	3
Cangzhou Mighty Lions	Total		9	1	4	2	0	0	0	0	13	3
Wuhan Three Towns	2023	Chinese Super League	11	0	1	0	0	0	0	0	12	0
Yunnan Yukun	2024	China League One	28	5	2	0	–		–		30	5
Yunnan Yukun	2025	Chinese Super League	24	2	2	1	–		–		26	3
Yunnan Yukun	Total		52	7	4	1	0	0	0	0	56	8
Dalian Yingbo	2026	Chinese Super League	0	0	0	0	–		–		0	0
Career total			220	17	26	8	0	0	0	0	246	25

== Honours ==
=== Club ===
Jiangsu Suning

- Chinese Super League: 2020

Dalian Yingbo

- Chinese Super League: 2026
