= Liu Weiguo =

Chinese footballer

Liu Weiguo 刘伟国
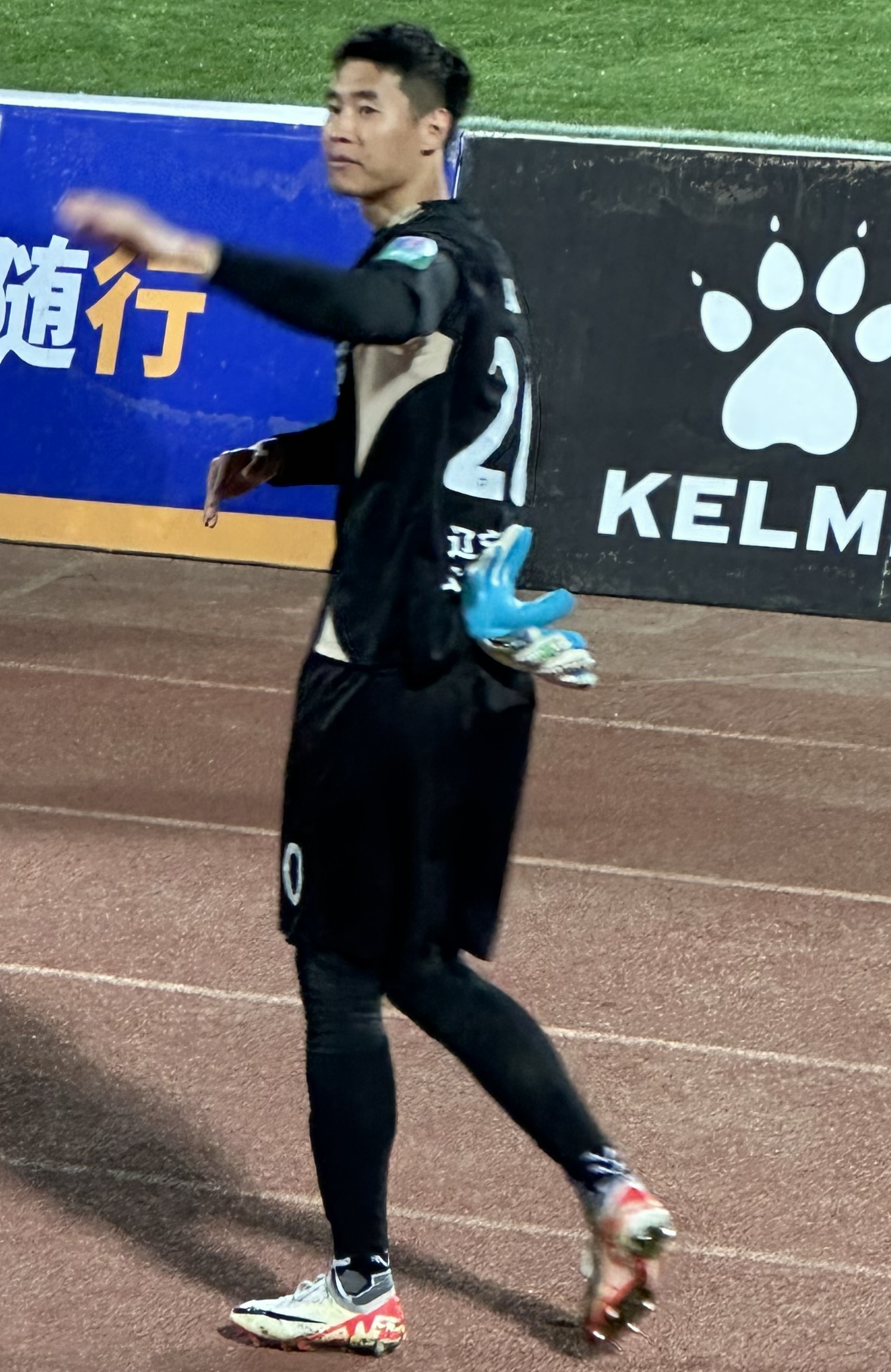
- Liu Weiguo in April 2025

Personal information
- Full name: Liu Weiguo
- Date of birth: 3 May 1992 (age 34)
- Place of birth: Tianjin, China
- Height: 1.95 m (6 ft 5 in)
- Position: Goalkeeper

Team information
- Current team: Dalian Yingbo
- Number: 20

Youth career
- 2006–2010: Shandong Luneng

Senior career*
Years	Team	Apps	(Gls)
2011	Shandong Luneng	0	(0)
2012–2014	Dalian Aerbin	27	(0)
2015–2021	Guangzhou FC	3	(0)
2016	→ Liaoning Whowin (loan)	0	(0)
2017	→ Yinchuan Helanshan (loan)	13	(0)
2019	→ Inner Mongolia Zhongyou (loan)	30	(0)
2022	Changchun Yatai	7	(0)
2023	Chongqing Tonglianglong	6	(0)
2024–2025	Liaoning Tieren	56	(0)
2026–	Dalian Yingbo	19	(0)
- * Club domestic league appearances and goals as of 19 November 2026

Liu Weiguo (Chinese: 刘伟国; pinyin: Liú Wěiguó, Mandarin pronunciation: [ljǒʊ wèɪ kwǒ]; born 3 May 1992) is a Chinese professional footballer who plays for Chinese Super League club Dalian Yingbo.

== Club career ==
Liu Weiguo started his football career when he joined Shandong Luneng's youth academy at the age of 14 and was promoted to the club's first team in 2011. He played as the fourth-choice goalkeeper throughout the 2011 season. In November 2011, he transferred to Chinese Super League promoted side Dalian Aerbin to seek more playing time. On 18 July 2012, he made his debut for the club in the fourth round of the 2012 Chinese FA Cup in which Dalian won 2–0 against Shenyang Shenbei. On 5 August 2012, then manager Aleksandar Stanojević decided to replace Yu Ziqian, who had made many mistakes in several games throughout the 2012 season, with Liu who made his league debut for the club in a 1–1 draw against Shanghai Shenxin. Liu remained as the club's first-choice goalkeeper for the rest of the season after his outstanding debut. He later became the second-choice goalkeeper after Zhang Chong transferred to the club from Dalian Shide in 2013.

On 10 July 2015, Liu transferred to Chinese Super League club Guangzhou Evergrande. He was loaned to Liaoning Whowin for one season on 26 February 2016. He played two Chinese FA Cup matches for Liaoning throughout the entirety of his loan spell. Liu was named at Guangzhou Evergrande's reserve squad in the 2017 season. On 23 June 2017, Liu moved to China League Two side Yinchuan Helanshan on a half season loan deal. He returned to Guangzhou Evergrande but didn't name in the club's squad. In February 2019, Liu was loaned to China League One side Inner Mongolia Zhongyou for the 2019 season.

On 18 September 2020, Liu finally made his debut for Evergrande after 5 years since joining the club, keeping a clean sheet in a 2–0 win against Henan Jianye in the first round of the 2020 Chinese FA Cup.

On 29 April 2022, Liu joined Chinese Super League club Changchun Yatai. He made his debut for Yatai on 4 June 2022 in a 4–1 win against Guangzhou City. On 16 June 2022, his unmindful mistakes directly led to 2 opposition goals in a 4–0 defeat against Shandong Taishan, and he was subsequently substituted after the second one at the 60th minute.

On 29 December 2025, Liu announced his departure from Liaoning Tieren after the 2025 season.

On 24 January 2026, Liu joined Chinese Super League club Dalian Yingbo.

== Career statistics ==
As of match played 8 November 2025.

Appearances and goals by club, season and competition
Club	Season	League			National Cup		Continental		Other		Total	
Club	Season	Division	Apps	Goals	Apps	Goals	Apps	Goals	Apps	Goals	Apps	Goals
Shandong Luneng Taishan	2011	Chinese Super League	0	0	0	0	0	0	-		0	0
Dalian Aerbin	2012	Chinese Super League	11	0	2	0	-		-		13	0
Dalian Aerbin	2013	Chinese Super League	7	0	0	0	-		-		7	0
Dalian Aerbin	2014	Chinese Super League	0	0	0	0	-		-		0	0
Dalian Aerbin	2015	China League One	9	0	1	0	-		-		10	0
Dalian Aerbin	Total		27	0	3	0	0	0	0	0	30	0
Guangzhou Evergrande	2015	Chinese Super League	0	0	0	0	0	0	-		0	0
Guangzhou Evergrande	2020	Chinese Super League	1	0	1	0	0	0	-		2	0
Guangzhou Evergrande	2021	Chinese Super League	2	0	0	0	0	0	-		2	0
Guangzhou Evergrande	Total		3	0	1	0	0	0	0	0	4	0
Liaoning Whowin (loan)	2016	Chinese Super League	0	0	2	0	-		-		2	0
Yinchuan Helanshan (loan)	2017	China League Two	13	0	0	0	-		-		13	0
Inner Mongolia Zhongyou (loan)	2019	China League One	30	0	0	0	-		-		30	0
Changchun Yatai	2022	Chinese Super League	4	0	0	0	-		-		4	0
Chongqing Tonglianglong	2023	China League Two	6	0	1	0	-		-		7	0
Liaoning Tieren	2024	China League One	27	0	0	0	-		-		27	0
Liaoning Tieren	2025	China League One	29	0	1	0	-		-		30	0
Liaoning Tieren	Total		56	0	1	0	0	0	0	0	57	0
Career total			139	0	8	0	0	0	0	0	147	0

== Honours ==
Liaoning Tieren

- China League One: 2025

Dalian Yingbo

- Chinese Super League: 2026
