= Song Yue =

Chinese association football player

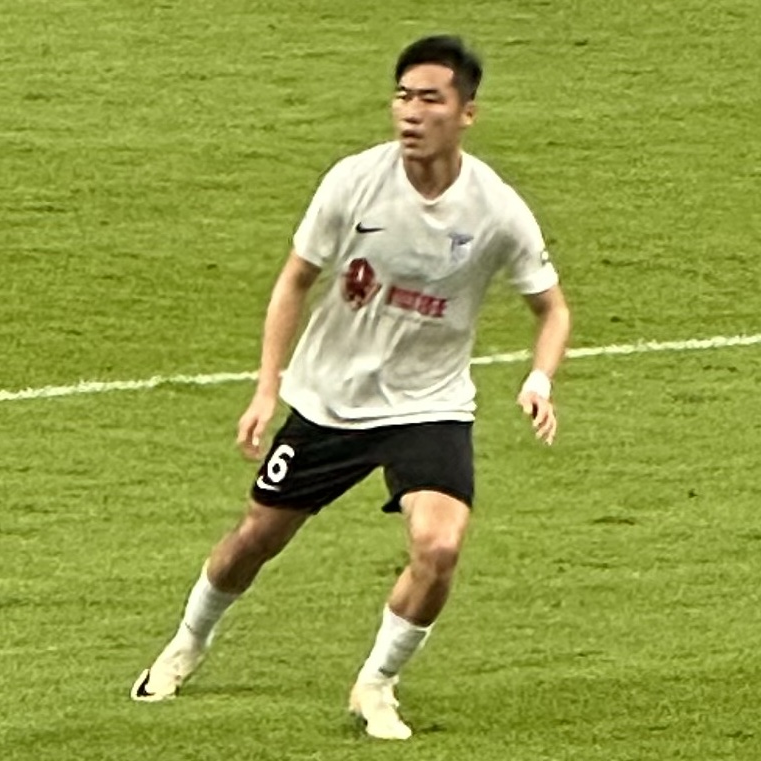
- Song Yue in April 2025

Personal information
- Date of birth: 20 November 1991 (age 34)
- Place of birth: Zhenjiang, Jiangsu, China
- Height: 1.84 m (6 ft 0 in)
- Positions: Centre-back; left-back

Team information
- Current team: Dalian Yingbo
- Number: 6

Youth career
- 2006–2010: Jiangsu Suning
- 2010–2017: Hohai University

Senior career*
Years	Team	Apps	(Gls)
2014–2016	Suzhou Dongwu	16	(0)
2017	Nanjing Shaye	-	(-)
2018–2020	Nantong Zhiyun	57	(5)
2020–2022	Tianjin TEDA	50	(2)
2023–2024	Shenzhen Peng City	40	(1)
2025–	Dalian Yingbo	33	(0)
- * Club domestic league appearances and goals as of 19 November 2026

Song Yue (Chinese: 宋岳; born 20 November 1991) is a Chinese footballer currently playing as a centre-back or left-back for Dalian Yingbo.

== Club career ==
Song Yue played for the Jiangsu Suning youth team. Instead of immediately continuing with his football career, he continued his studies at Hohai University while still playing in the Chinese University Football League. He also represented China in the 2015 Summer Universiade tournament. While he completed his studies he played for amateur football club Suzhou Dongwu. They quickly went up the leagues and became a professional team once they won the Chinese Football Association Member Association Champions League (CMCL) division in 2015. After a season of professional football, he returned to Hohai University, which had signed a cooperation deal with Nanjing Shaye to utilize their football squad and participate within the CMCL.

Song returned to professional football with a move to third tier football club Nantong Zhiyun and gained promotion with the club at the end of the 2018 China League Two campaign. The next year, he played a vital role in ensuring the club remained in the division and on 30 July 2020, Song transferred to top tier football club Tianjin TEDA for the start of the 2020 Chinese Super League campaign for a reported fee of 2 million Yuan. He made his debut on 6 August 2020 in a league game against Beijing Sinobo Guoan F.C. that ended in a 3-1 defeat.

== Career statistics ==
As of 1 January 2026.

Club	Season	League			Cup		Continental		Other		Total	
Club	Season	Division	Apps	Goals	Apps	Goals	Apps	Goals	Apps	Goals	Apps	Goals
Suzhou Dongwu	2014	–			1	0	–		–		1	0
Suzhou Dongwu	2015	CMCL	–		0	0	–		–		0	0
Suzhou Dongwu	2016	China League Two	16	0	2	0	–		–		18	0
Suzhou Dongwu	Total		16	0	3	0	0	0	0	0	19	0
Nanjing Shaye	2017	CMCL	–		–		–		–		–	
Nantong Zhiyun	2018	China League Two	29	5	3	0	–		–		32	5
Nantong Zhiyun	2019	China League One	28	0	1	0	–		–		29	0
Nantong Zhiyun	Total		57	5	4	0	0	0	0	0	61	5
Tianjin TEDA	2020	Chinese Super League	15	2	4	0	–		–		19	2
Tianjin TEDA	2021	Chinese Super League	11	0	2	0	–		–		13	0
Tianjin TEDA	2022	Chinese Super League	24	0	0	0	–		–		24	0
Tianjin TEDA	Total		50	2	6	0	0	0	0	0	51	2
Shenzhen Peng City	2023	China League One	25	1	1	0	–		–		26	1
Shenzhen Peng City	2024	Chinese Super League	15	0	2	0	–		–		17	0
Shenzhen Peng City	Total		40	1	3	0	0	0	0	0	43	1
Dalian Yingbo	2025	Chinese Super League	20	0	2	0	–		–		22	0
Career total			183	8	18	0	0	0	0	0	201	8

== Club honour ==
Suzhou Dongwu

- Chinese Champions League: 2015

Dalian Yingbo

- Chinese Super League: 2026
