= Wang Shiqin =

Chinese footballer (born 2003)

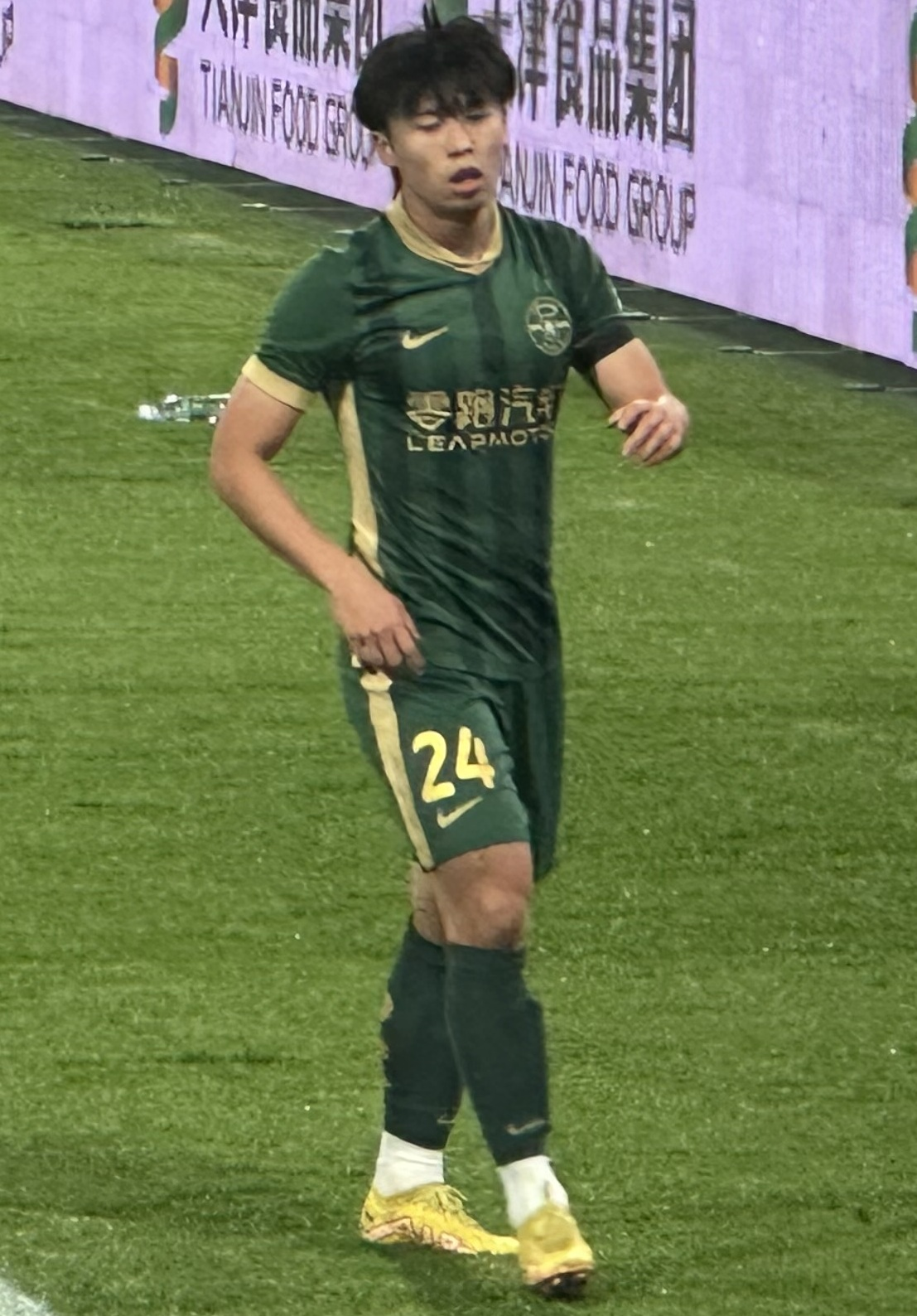
- Wang Shiqin in April 2025

Personal information
- Full name: Wang Shiqin
- Date of birth: 24 June 2003 (age 23)
- Place of birth: Ya'an, Sichuan, China
- Height: 1.83 m (6 ft 0 in)
- Positions: Left-back; centre-back

Team information
- Current team: Zhejiang FC
- Number: 17

Youth career
- –2023: Chongqing Furen High School

Senior career*
Years	Team	Apps	(Gls)
2023–2024	Chongqing Tonglianglong	51	(1)
2025–	Zhejiang FC	36	(0)

International career^{‡}
2024–2026	China U23	12	(0)
2025–	China	2	(0)
Medal record
Representing China
Men's football
EAFF Championship
Bronze medal – third place	2025 South Korea	Team
- * Club domestic league appearances and goals as of 19 November 2026 ‡ National team caps and goals as of 22 November 2025

Wang Shiqin (simplified Chinese: 汪士钦; traditional Chinese: 汪士欽; pinyin: Wāng Shìqīn; born 24 June 2003) is a Chinese professional footballer who plays as a left-back or centre-back for Chinese Super League club Zhejiang FC and the China national team.

== Early life ==
Born in Ya'an, Sichuan, to hukou in Baoxing County, Wang Shiqin is a graduate of Chongqing Furen High School. In 2021, he competed for the under-18s of Chongqing in the 2021 National Games of China.

== Club career ==
=== Chongqing Tonglianglong ===
On 27 April 2023, Wang Shiqin was named in the first-team squad of China League Two club Chongqing Tonglianglong for the 2023 season after graduating from Chongqing Furen High School, wearing the number 57. During the 2023 season, he started in all twenty-two league matches and five 2023 Chinese FA Cup matches. He helped the club win promotion to China League One as champions, as well as a quarter-final finish in the CFA Cup. Before the 2024 season, Wang Shiqin switched to the shirt number 17. On 2 June 2024, Wang Shiqin scored his first professional goal, converting from a direct free kick in a home league match against Shijiazhuang Gongfu.

=== Zhejiang FC ===
On 15 February 2025, Wang Shiqin completed a transfer to Chinese Super League club Zhejiang FC on a free transfer, selecting the shirt number 24. He made his debut for the club on 23 February 2025, starting and playing 89 minutes in the season opener in a 1–1 home draw with Dalian Yingbo.

== International career ==
On 28 February 2025, Wang Shiqin received his first call-up to the China national team, in preparation for two 2026 FIFA World Cup qualifier matches against Saudi Arabia and Australia.

On 12 July 2025, he made his debut for China against Japan in the 2025 EAFF E-1 Football Championship.

In November 2025, he was called up to the China U22 to play in the 2025 Panda Cup. On 12 November, his error led to the deciding goal of a 1–0 defeat to Vietnam.

== Personal life ==
Wang Shiqin's mother died in 2018. He dedicated his first professional goal to his mother, on 2 June 2024.

== Career statistics ==
=== Club ===
As of 22 November 2025

Appearances and goals by club, season, and competition
Club	Season	League			Cup		Continental		Other		Total	
Club	Season	Division	Apps	Goals	Apps	Goals	Apps	Goals	Apps	Goals	Apps	Goals
Chongqing Tonglianglong	2023	China League Two	22	0	5	0	–		–		27	0
Chongqing Tonglianglong	2024	China League One	29	1	2	0	–		–		31	1
Chongqing Tonglianglong	Total		51	1	7	0	0	0	0	0	58	1
Zhejiang FC	2025	Chinese Super League	26	0	1	0	–		–		27	0
Career total			77	1	8	0	0	0	0	0	85	1

=== International ===
As of 15 July 2025

Appearances and goals by national team and year
National team	Year	Apps	Goals
China	2025	2	0
Total		2	0

== Honours ==
Chongqing Tonglianglong

- China League Two: 2023
