= Zhang Huachen =

Chinese footballer

Zhang Huachen 张华晨
Personal information
- Full name: Zhang Huachen
- Date of birth: 16 March 1998 (age 28)
- Place of birth: Shanghai, China
- Height: 1.75 m (5 ft 9 in)
- Position: Midfielder

Team information
- Current team: Dalian Yingbo
- Number: 8

Youth career
- Shanghai Luckystar
- 2014–2016: Shanghai SIPG

Senior career*
Years	Team	Apps	(Gls)
2017–2023	Shanghai Port	52	(3)
2020	→ Nantong Zhiyun (loan)	10	(0)
2024–2025	Changchun Yatai	39	(1)
2026–	Dalian Yingbo	16	(0)
- * Club domestic league appearances and goals as of 19 November 2026

Zhang Huachen (simplified Chinese: 张华晨; traditional Chinese: 張華晨; pinyin: Zhāng Huáchén; born 16 March 1998) is a Chinese footballer who currently plays for Dalian Yingbo in the Chinese Super League.

== Club career ==
Zhang Huachen joined Chinese Super League side Shanghai SIPG's (renamed later as Shanghai Port) youth academy in November 2014 when Shanghai SIPG bought Shanghai Luckystar' youth team. He was promoted to the first team squad by André Villas-Boas in the 2017 season. On 4 March 2017, Zhang made his senior debut in a 5–1 home victory against Changchun Yatai as the benefit of the new rule of the Super League that at least one Under-23 player must in the starting. He was substituted off in the 29th minute when Shanghai was losing 1–0. He would be used as a squad player until he would be loaned out to second-tier club Nantong Zhiyun on 16 June 2020.

Zhang would return to Shanghai in the 2021 Chinese Super League campaign after his loan from Nantong. He would go on to gain more playing time and go on to score his first goal for the club on 6 August 2021, in a league game against Dalian Professional in a 5–0 victory.

On 26 January 2026, Zhang joined Chinese Super League side Dalian Yingbo.

== Career statistics ==
As of 31 December 2024.

Appearances and goals by club, season and competition
Club	Season	League			National Cup		Continental		Other		Total	
Club	Season	Division	Apps	Goals	Apps	Goals	Apps	Goals	Apps	Goals	Apps	Goals
Shanghai SIPG/ Shanghai Port	2017	Chinese Super League	12	0	0	0	1	0	-		13	0
Shanghai SIPG/ Shanghai Port	2018	Chinese Super League	4	0	1	0	0	0	-		5	0
Shanghai SIPG/ Shanghai Port	2019	Chinese Super League	1	0	0	0	0	0	0 (Note: Appearances in Chinese FA Super Cup)	0	1	0
Shanghai SIPG/ Shanghai Port	2020	Chinese Super League	0	0	1	0	0	0	-		1	0
Shanghai SIPG/ Shanghai Port	2021	Chinese Super League	12	2	5	0	0	0	-		17	2
Shanghai SIPG/ Shanghai Port	2022	Chinese Super League	22	1	1	0	-		-		23	1
Shanghai SIPG/ Shanghai Port	2023	Chinese Super League	1	0	0	0	0	0	-		1	0
Shanghai SIPG/ Shanghai Port	Total		52	3	8	0	1	0	0	0	61	3
Nantong Zhiyun (loan)	2020	China League One	10	0	-		-		-		10	0
Changchun Yatai	2024	Chinese Super League	17	0	2	0	-		-		19	0
Career total			79	3	10	0	1	0	0	0	90	3

== Honours ==
Shanghai Port

- Chinese Super League: 2018, 2023

Dalian Yingbo

- Chinese Super League: 2026
