= Liao Jintao =

Chinese association football player

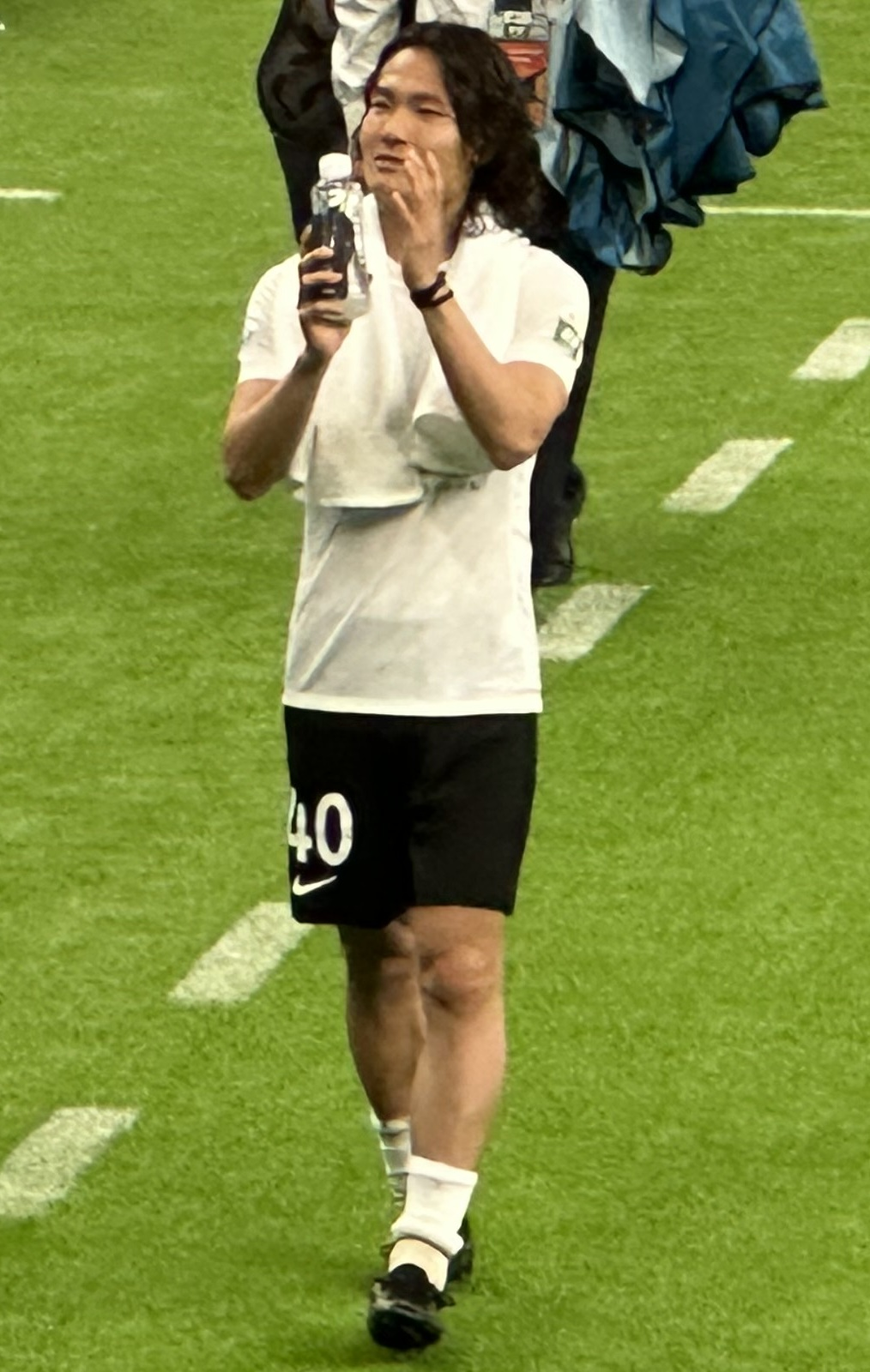
- Liao Jintao in April 2025

Personal information
- Date of birth: 24 February 2000 (age 26)
- Place of birth: Puning, Guangdong, China
- Height: 1.77 m (5 ft 10 in)
- Position: Midfielder

Team information
- Current team: Dalian Yingbo
- Number: 40

Youth career
- –2018: Guangzhou Evergrande

Senior career*
Years	Team	Apps	(Gls)
2019	Wuhan Three Towns	7	(0)
2020–2021	Guangzhou FC	0	(0)
2022	Kunshan FC	4	(0)
2023–2024	Guangzhou FC	55	(5)
2025–	Dalian Yingbo	57	(2)

International career^{‡}
2019	China U19	1	(0)
2025–	China	1	(0)
Medal record
Representing China
Men's football
EAFF Championship
Bronze medal – third place	2025 South Korea	Team
- * Club domestic league appearances and goals as of 19 November 2026 ‡ National team caps and goals as of 14:01, 25 June 2021 (UTC)

Liao Jintao (Chinese: 廖锦涛; born 24 February 2000) is a Chinese footballer currently playing as a midfielder for Chinese Super League club Dalian Yingbo and the China national team.

== Club career ==
Liao played for the Guangzhou FC youth team before joining then-China League Two club Wuhan Three Towns for the 2019 campaign. After only one season he returned to Guangzhou where he was utilized sparingly in cup matches before joining second tier club Kunshan on 26 April 2022. He had a run of several games within the team and was part of the squad that won the division and promotion to the top tier at the end of the 2022 China League One campaign.

In April 2023, Liao returned to Guangzhou, now in the second tier, following the dissolution of Kunshan for the start of the 2023 China League One campaign. He made his debut in a league game on 23 April 2023 against Liaoning Shenyang Urban in a 0-0 draw. This was followed by his first career goal, which was in a league game on 28 June 2023 against Jiangxi Lushan F.C. in a 2-1 victory.

On 21 January 2025, Liao joined Chinese Super League club Dalian Yingbo after Guangzhou released their entire squad.

== Career statistics ==
As of 19 November 2026.

Club	Season	League			Cup		Continental		Other		Total	
Club	Season	Division	Apps	Goals	Apps	Goals	Apps	Goals	Apps	Goals	Apps	Goals
Wuhan Three Towns	2019	China League Two	7	0	0	0	–		-		7	0
Guangzhou FC	2020	Chinese Super League	0	0	1	0	0 (Note: Appearances in the AFC Champions League)	0	-		1	0
Guangzhou FC	2021	Chinese Super League	0	0	1	0	6	0	-		7	0
Guangzhou FC	Total		0	0	2	0	6	0	0	0	2	0
Kunshan FC	2022	China League One	4	0	2	0	–		-		6	0
Guangzhou FC	2023	China League One	27	1	1	0	-		-		28	1
Guangzhou FC	2024	China League One	28	4	1	0	-		-		3	0
Guangzhou FC	Total		55	5	2	0	0	0	0	0	57	5
Dalian Yingbo	2025	Chinese Super League	29	0	2	0	-		-		31	0
Dalian Yingbo	2026	Chinese Super League	28	2	4	0	-		-		32	2
Dalian Yingbo	Total		57	2	6	0	0	0	0	0	63	2
Career total			123	7	12	0	6	0	0	0	141	7

== Honours ==
=== Club ===
Kunshan FC

- China League One: 2022

Dalian Yingbo

- Chinese Super League: 2026
