= Zhu Pengyu =

Chinese footballer (born 2005)

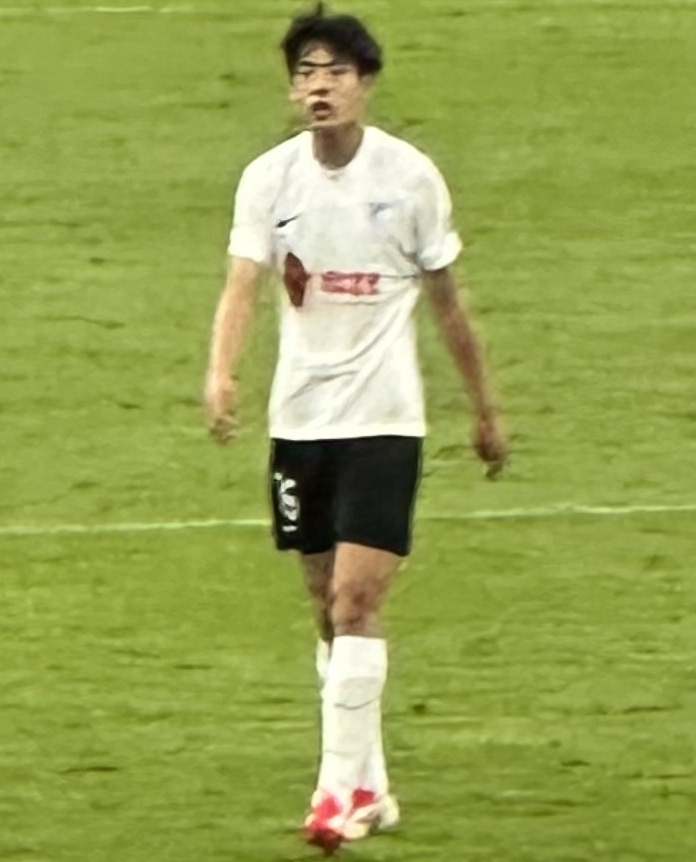
- Zhu Pengyu in April 2025

Personal information
- Full name: Zhu Pengyu
- Date of birth: 9 May 2005 (age 21)
- Place of birth: Dalian, Liaoning, China
- Height: 1.89 m (6 ft 2 in)
- Position: Striker

Team information
- Current team: Dalian Yingbo
- Number: 16

Youth career
- Dalian Northeast Road Primary School
- Dalian No. 21 Middle School
- Dalian Yuming High School

Senior career*
Years	Team	Apps	(Gls)
2024–	Dalian Yingbo	67	(7)

International career^{‡}
2024–2025	China U19	15	(12)
2025–	China U22	2	(2)
2026–	China	1	(0)
- * Club domestic league appearances and goals as of 19 November 2026 ‡ National team caps and goals as of 15:13, 5 June 2026 (UTC)

Zhu Pengyu (Chinese: 朱鹏宇; born 9 May 2005) is a Chinese professional footballer who plays as a centre-forward for Dalian Yingbo in the Chinese Super League and the China national team.

== Early life and career beginnings ==
Born in Dalian, Liaoning Province, Zhu began his football training at Dalian's Northeast Road Primary School, a well-known institution for youth football development. He later attended Dalian No. 21 Middle School and Dalian Yuming High School, where he became a standout player in the Dalian youth academy system. In 2017, he was named Best Player at the 14th Friedrich Cup in Germany and helped China win the ASEAN Youth Football Tournament.

== Club career ==
Zhu signed with Dalian Yingbo in February 2024 and made his professional debut on 30 March 2024 in China League One. In November 2024, he scored a 90th-minute header to secure a 2–1 victory over Shanghai Jiading, which helped Dalian earn promotion to the Chinese Super League. During the 2024 season, he recorded 5 goals and 4 assists in 25 appearances.

== International career ==
Zhu gained recognition with the China U19 national team during the 2024 Panda Cup, scoring braces against Mongolia in both the group stage (6–0) and semifinals (4–0). At the 2025 U20 Asian Cup, he scored twice as a substitute in a 5–2 victory over Kyrgyzstan, contributing to China's advancement to the knockout stage. He was called up to the senior China national team for a set of friendlies in June 2026.

== Career statistics ==
As of 16 February 2025

Club	Season	League	Goals	Assists
Dalian Yingbo	2024	China League One	5	4
Dalian Yingbo	2024	Chinese FA Cup	0	0

== Honours ==
Dalian Yingbo

- Chinese Super League: 2026
