= Pedro Delgado (footballer, born 1997) =

Footballer (born 1997)

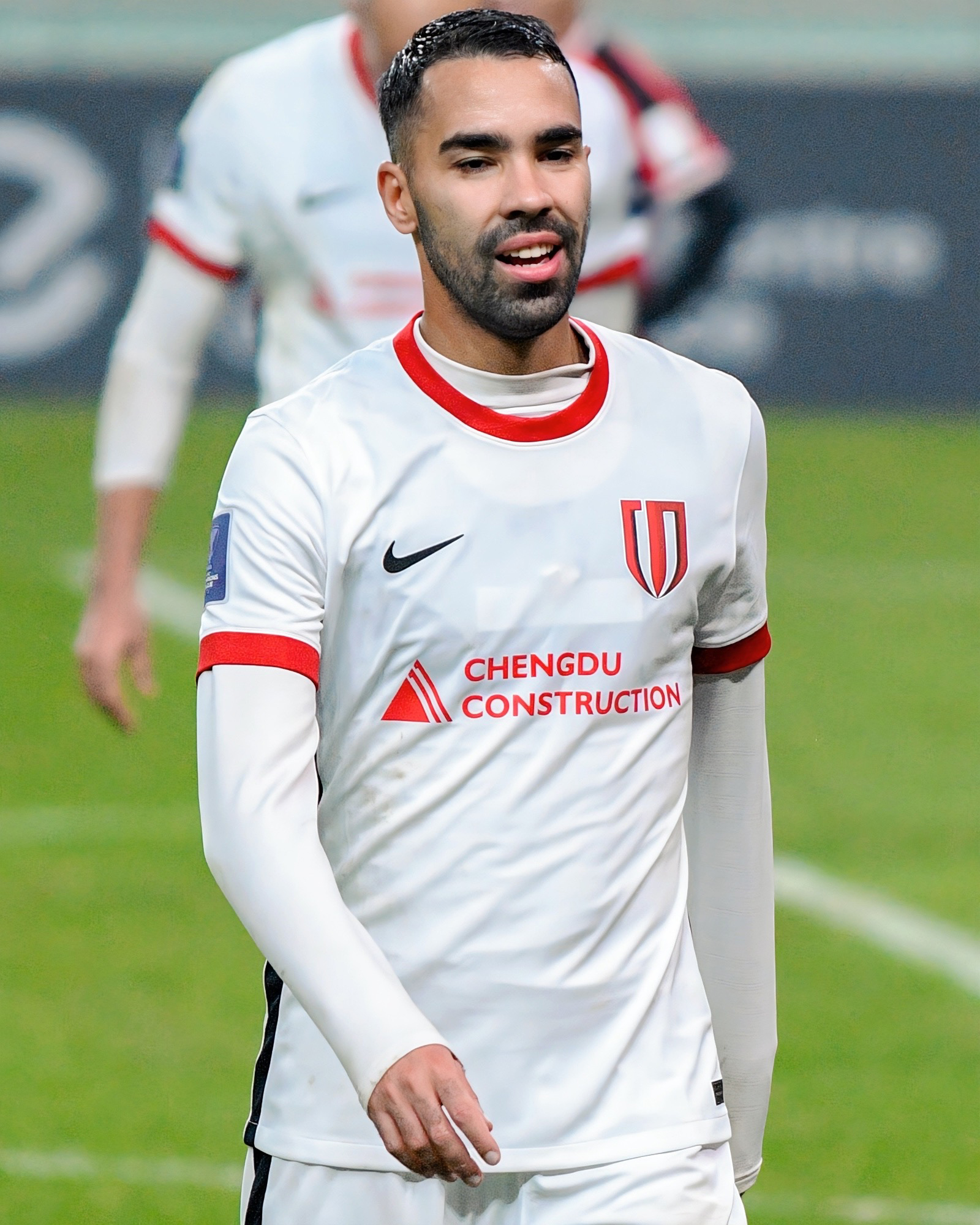
- Delgado in November 2025

Personal information
- Full name: Pedro Miguel Gomes Delgado
- Date of birth: 7 April 1997 (age 29)
- Place of birth: Portimão, Portugal
- Height: 1.88 m (6 ft 2 in)
- Position: Attacking midfielder

Team information
- Current team: Dalian Yingbo (on loan from Shandong Taishan)
- Number: 9

Youth career
- 2010–2012: Sporting
- 2012–2013: Portimonense
- 2013–2016: Inter Milan

Senior career*
Years	Team	Apps	(Gls)
2016–2018	Sporting B	57	(11)
2018–	Shandong Taishan	47	(11)
2020	→ Aves (loan)	4	(0)
2022	→ Kunshan FC (loan)	18	(7)
2023	→ Suzhou Dongwu (loan)	11	(0)
2025	→ Chengdu Rongcheng (loan)	21	(3)
2026–	→ Dalian Yingbo (loan)	8	(1)

International career
2013	Portugal U16	9	(2)
2013–2014	Portugal U17	6	(1)
2014–2015	Portugal U18	3	(1)
2015–2016	Portugal U19	11	(3)
2016–2017	Portugal U20	10	(0)
2017–2018	Portugal U21	5	(0)
- * Club domestic league appearances and goals as of 19 November 2026

Pedro Delgado
- Chinese: 德尔加多
Transcriptions
Standard Mandarin
- Hanyu Pinyin: Dé'ěrjiāduō

Pedro Miguel Gomes Delgado (born 7 April 1997) is a Portuguese professional footballer who plays as an attacking midfielder for Chinese Super League club Dalian Yingbo, on loan from Shandong Taishan. Delgado represented Portugal at youth level.

== Club career ==
On 28 August 2016, Delgado joined Primeira Liga side Sporting from Inter Milan as part of João Mário's transfer deal. On 11 September 2016, Delgado made his professional debut with Sporting B in a 2016–17 LigaPro match against Varzim. After two seasons Delgado joined Chinese Super League side Shandong Luneng on 1 August 2018 for €800,000. He would fail to register for official matches in the 2018 season due to the foreign player limit. He would eventually gain clearance to play the following season and on 30 June 2019 he made his debut in a league game against Beijing Guoan in a 2-0 victory.

On 1 February 2020, Delgado joined Primeira Liga club Aves on loan until the end of 2019–20 season. On his return to Shandong he would be part of the squad that won the 2021 Chinese Super League title. While he would gain Chinese citizenship, he would not meet the requirements as a domestic player by the Chinese Football Association and was loaned out to second tier club Kunshan FC on 26 August 2022. He would go on to establish himself as regular within the team and was part of the squad that won the division and promotion to the top tier at the end of the 2022 China League One campaign.

On 20 July 2023, Delgado signed with China League One club Suzhou Dongwu on loan.

On 18 February 2025, Delgado signed with another Chinese Super League club Chengdu Rongcheng on loan. On 19 January 2026, the club announced his departure after the 2025 season.

On 14 July 2026, Delgado was loaned out to Chinese Super League side Dalian Yingbo for the rest of 2026 season.

== Personal life ==
Born and raised in Portimão, Portugal, Delgado's father Amilcar Delgado was a Cape Verdean former footballer. Delgado gained Chinese citizenship in 2019. He has no Chinese ancestry.

== Career statistics ==
As of 23 November 2024.

Appearances and goals by club, season and competition
Club	Season	League			National Cup		Continental		Other		Total	
Club	Season	Division	Apps	Goals	Apps	Goals	Apps	Goals	Apps	Goals	Apps	Goals
Sporting B	2016–17	LigaPro	28	5	—		—		—		28	5
Sporting B	2017–18	LigaPro	29	6	—		—		—		29	6
Sporting B	Total		57	11	—		—		—		57	11
Shandong Luneng	2019	Chinese Super League	7	0	1	0	0	0	—		8	0
Shandong Luneng	2021	Chinese Super League	14	5	4	4	—		—		18	9
Shandong Luneng	2023	Chinese Super League	—		—		—		1	0	1	0
Shandong Luneng	2024	Chinese Super League	26	6	6	1	2	0	—		34	7
Shandong Luneng	Total		47	11	11	5	2	0	1	0	61	16
Aves (loan)	2019–20	Primeira Liga	4	0	0	0	—		—		4	0
Kunshan FC (loan)	2022	China League One	18	7	0	0	—		—		18	7
Suzhou Dongwu (loan)	2023	China League One	11	0	—		—		—		11	0
Career total			137	29	11	5	2	0	1	0	151	34

== Honours ==
Shandong Taishan

- Chinese Super League: 2021
- Chinese FA Cup: 2021

Kunshan FC

- China League One: 2022

Dalian Yingbo

- Chinese Super League: 2026

== See also ==
- List of Chinese naturalized footballers
