= Li Guoxu =

Chinese football player and manager

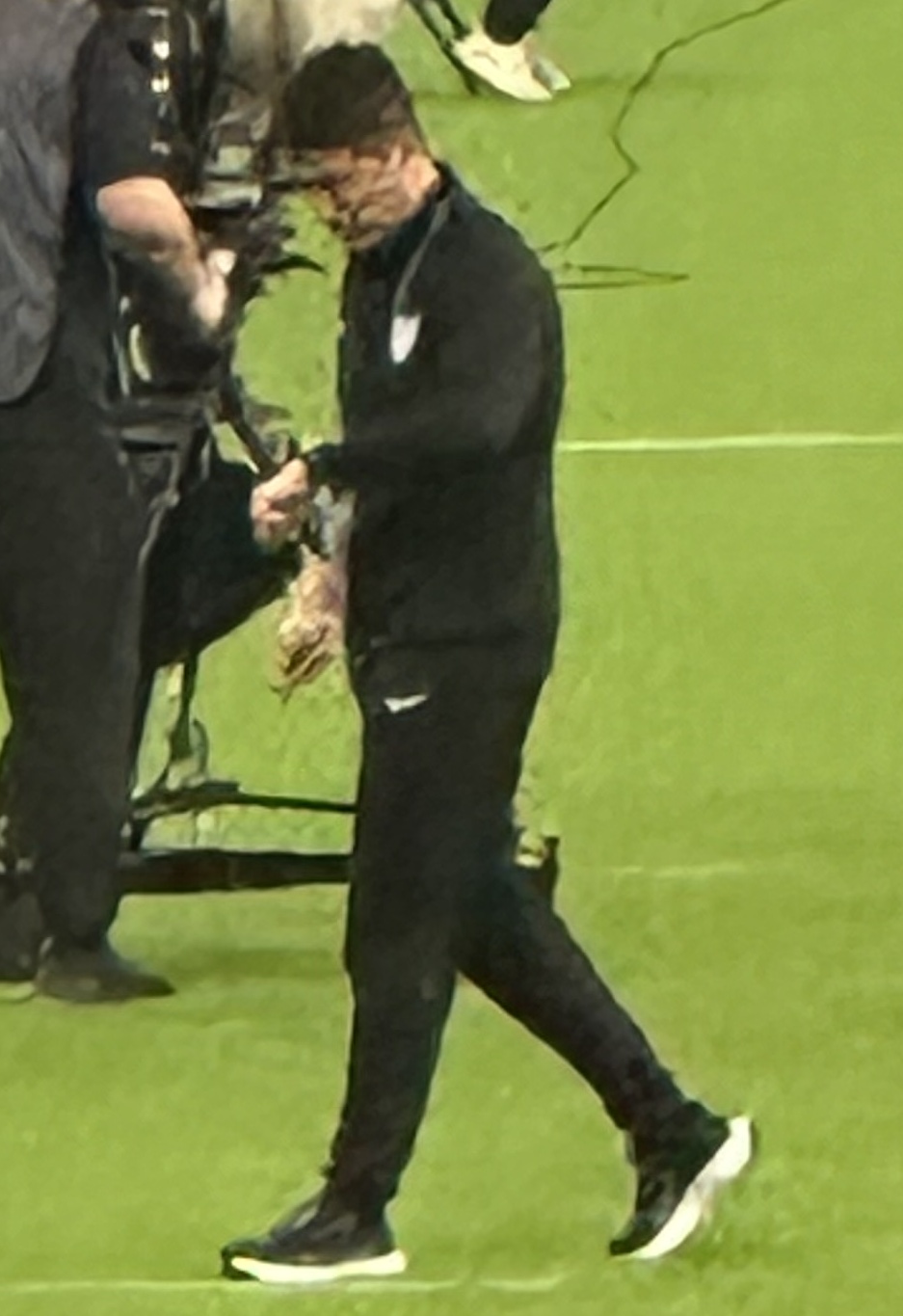
- Li Guoxu in April 2025

Personal information
- Date of birth: 11 April 1978 (age 48)
- Place of birth: Dalian, Liaoning, China
- Height: 1.79 m (5 ft 10 in)
- Position: Midfielder

Team information
- Current team: Dalian Yingbo (head coach)

Youth career
- –1997: Dalian

Senior career*
Years	Team	Apps	(Gls)
1997–1998	Dalian Wanda		
1999	Chongqing Hongyan		
2000	Shaanxi National Power		
2001–2005	Chongqing Lifan		
2004	→ Boca Juniors (loan)		
2006–2007	Chengdu Blades		

Managerial career
- 2010–2014: Dalian Aerbin reserves
- 2017–2018: Dalian Transcendence
- 2022–: Dalian Yingbo
- * Club domestic league appearances and goals

Li Guoxu (simplified Chinese: 李国旭; traditional Chinese: 李國旭; pinyin: Lǐ Guóxù; born 11 April 1978) is a Chinese football manager and former player. He is the current head coach of Dalian Yingbo.

== Club career ==
Li Guoxu started his career at Dalian Wanda.

In 1999, he left Dalian Wanda to join Chongqing Hongyan in the Chinese Jia B league.

In 2000, he moved to Shaanxi National Power.

In 2001, he returned to Chongqing and joined Chongqing Lifan. He scored 4 goals in the 8–1 victory against Công an in the Asian Cup Winners' Cup.

In March 2004, he joined Boca Juniors on a short loan. He suffered phalanx fracture, and did not have appearances. He returned to Chongqing in July 2004.

In 2007, he transferred to Chengdu Blades.

== Managerial career ==
Following Li's retirement in 2009, he joined Dalian Aerbin as assistant coach. He also managed Dalian Aerbin's reserve team from 2012.

In 2017, Li was appointed as the reserve manager of Dalian Transcendence. He was promoted to first team manager during the season. In the 2018 season, he was officially appointed as manager but was sacked soon due to poor performances.

In 2019, Li returned to the renamed Dalian Yifang as reserves manager, but left the team not long after Benitez's arrival.

In 2022, Li sided with the newly established Dalian Duxing in the Chinese Champions League, and promoted into the China League Two by the end of the season. In 2024, the renamed Dalian Yingbo won promotion to the Chinese Super League.

In 2026, as Dalian Yingbo won their first ever title in the Chinese Super League five years after its foundation, Li became the fifth domestic coach in CSL history to lead a team to a championship.

== Career statistics ==
As of 3 March 2015

Appearances and goals by club, season and competition
Club	Season	League			National Cup		League Cup		Total	
Club	Season	Division	Apps	Goals	Apps	Goals	Apps	Goals	Apps	Goals
Dalian Wanda	1997	Jia A League	4	0	?	0	-		4	0
Dalian Wanda	1998	Jia A League	8	0	?	0	-		0	0
Chongqing Hongyan	1999	Jia B League	?	2	?	1	-		0	3
Shaanxi National Power	2000	Jia B League	18	0	?	0	-		18	0
Chongqing Lifan	2001	Jia A League	24	5	1	1	-		25	6
Chongqing Lifan	2002	Jia A League	27	5	1	1	-		28	6
Chongqing Lifan	2003	Jia A League	28	2	?	0	-		28	2
Chongqing Lifan	2004	Chinese Super League	5	0	0	0	0	0	5	0
Boca Juniors	2003–04	Argentine Primera División	0	0	0	0	-		0	0
Chongqing Lifan	2005	Chinese Super League	14	1	1	0	3	3	18	4
Chengdu Blades	2006	China League One	18	2	0	0	-		18	2
Chengdu Blades	2007	China League One	6	0	-		-		6	0
Career Total			152	17	3	3	3	3	158	23

== Honours ==
=== Player ===
Dalian Wanda

- Chinese Jia-A League: 1997, 1998
- Chinese Super Cup: 1997

Shaanxi National Power

- Chinese Jia-B League: 2000

=== Manager ===
Dalian Yingbo

- Chinese Super League: 2026
