= Tang Tian (footballer) =

Chinese footballer and coach

Tang Tian 唐田
Personal information
- Full name: Tang Tian
- Date of birth: 3 March 1977 (age 49)
- Place of birth: Dalian, Liaoning, China
- Height: 1.90 m (6 ft 3 in)
- Position: Defender

Senior career*
Years	Team	Apps	(Gls)
2000	Changchun Yatai	0	(0)
2002–2003	Bayi Football Team	40	(1)
2004	Dalian Shide	6	(0)
2005	Shanghai The 9	10	(0)
2006–2008	Dalian Shide	29	(0)
2009	Jiangsu Sainty	20	(0)
2010	Persipura Jayapura	1	(0)

Managerial career
- 2013: Tianjin Songjiang (assistant)
- 2014–2017: Shanghai Shenhua (assistant)
- 2018–2020: Dalian Yifang (assistant)
- 2023–2026: Shandong Taishan (assistant)
- 2026: Shandong Taishan (caretaker)
- * Club domestic league appearances and goals as of 1 Jan 2012

Tang Tian (Chinese: 唐田 born on March 3, 1977, in Dalian) is a Chinese football coach and a former professional footballer who previously played as a defender.

== Club career ==
Tang Tian initially started his career with second-tier football club Changchun Yatai, but by the 2000 Chinese league season he could not establish himself within the team and would leave the club. He revived his career with top-tier club Bayi Football Team and went on to establish himself as a regular within the team until the end of the 2003 league season when the club were relegated. With the club unable to cope with the relegation they disbanded and Tang was allowed to find a new club in top-tier team Dalian Shide who he joined the following season. At Dalian he could not establish himself as a regular and he soon joined second-tier club Shanghai The 9 for a season. Tang would return to Dalian and during his second stint he would gain more playing time until he left at the end of the 2008 league season. He would then have a stint at top-tier club Jiangsu Sainty before going to the Indonesia Super League for a short time where he joined Persipura Jayapura.
