= Dalian Suoyuwan Football Stadium =

Football stadium in Dalian, China

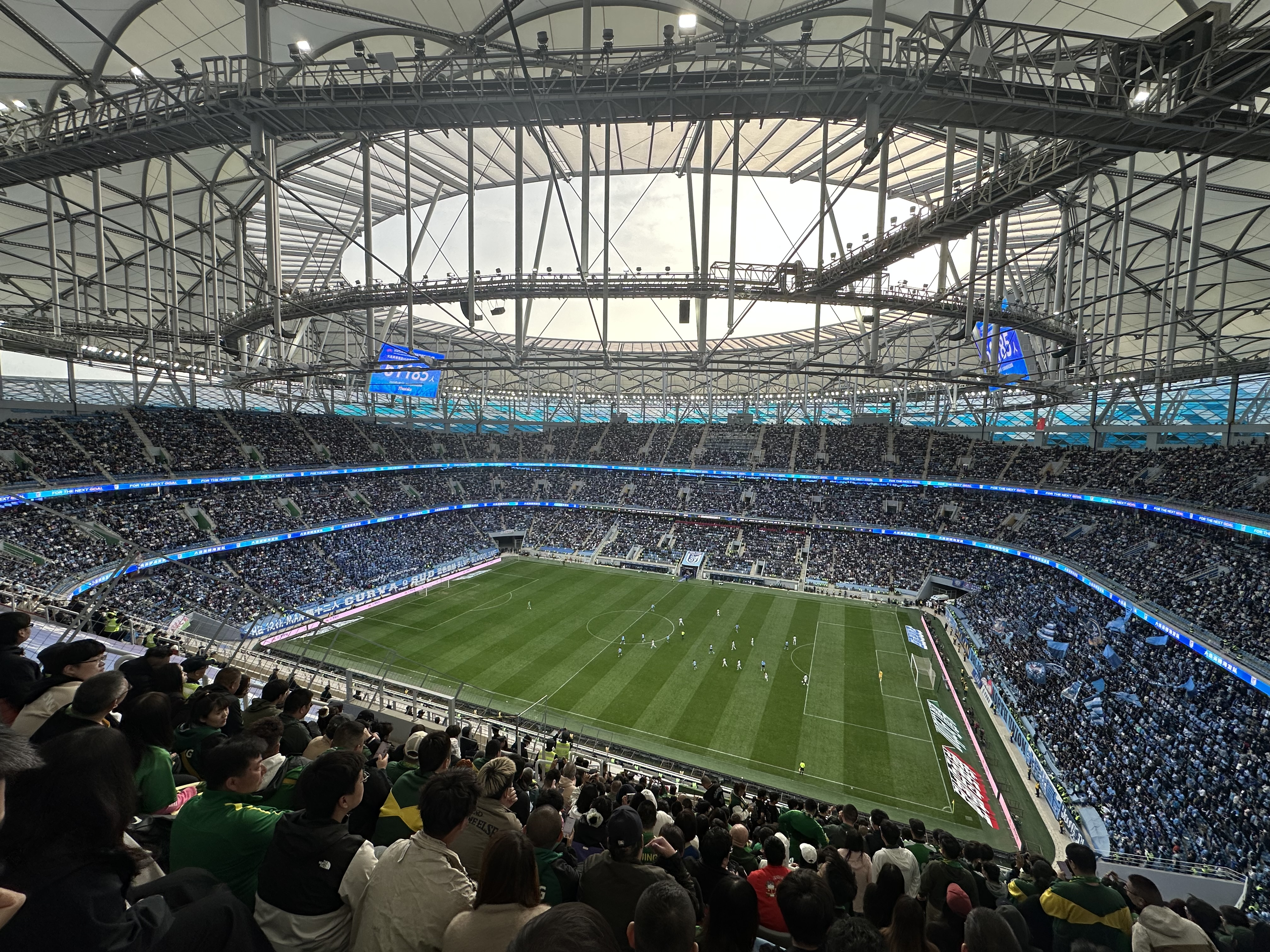
- Interactive map of Dalian Suoyuwan Football Stadium
- Location: Dalian, Liaoning, China
- Coordinates: 38°57′05″N 121°37′11″E
- Capacity: 63,677
- Surface: Grass
- Record attendance: 61,185 (Dalian Yingbo vs Beijing Guoan, 5 May 2025)
- Public transit: 5 at Suoyuwan South

Construction
- Groundbreaking: 2020
- Opened: 2023
- Cost: £260 million
- Architects: Building Design Partnership; Buro Happold; Harbin Institute of Technology; Dalian Construction Science Research and Design Institute
- Structural engineer: China Construction Eighth Engineering Division
- General contractor: China Construction Eighth Engineering Division

Tenants
- Dalian Pro (2023); Dalian Yingbo (2024–present)

The Dalian Suoyuwan Football Stadium (Chinese: 大连梭鱼湾足球场; pinyin: Dàlián Suōyúwān Zúqiúchǎng), currently known as the Zhongsheng Suoyuwan Football Stadium (Chinese: 中升梭鱼湾足球场) for sponsorship reasons, is a 63,677-seat football stadium in Dalian, Liaoning, China. The stadium was the home of Dalian Pro during the 2023 Chinese Super League season. Since 2024, the stadium is used by the Chinese Super League side Dalian Yingbo.

The stadium was built by the China State Construction Engineering Corporation (CSCEC). The construction of the stadium began in 2020 and was completed in 2023.

== History ==
On 16 June 2023, the China national football team hosted Myanmar in a friendly match at the Suoyuwan Football Stadium, which ended in a 4–0 win for China.

== Gallery ==
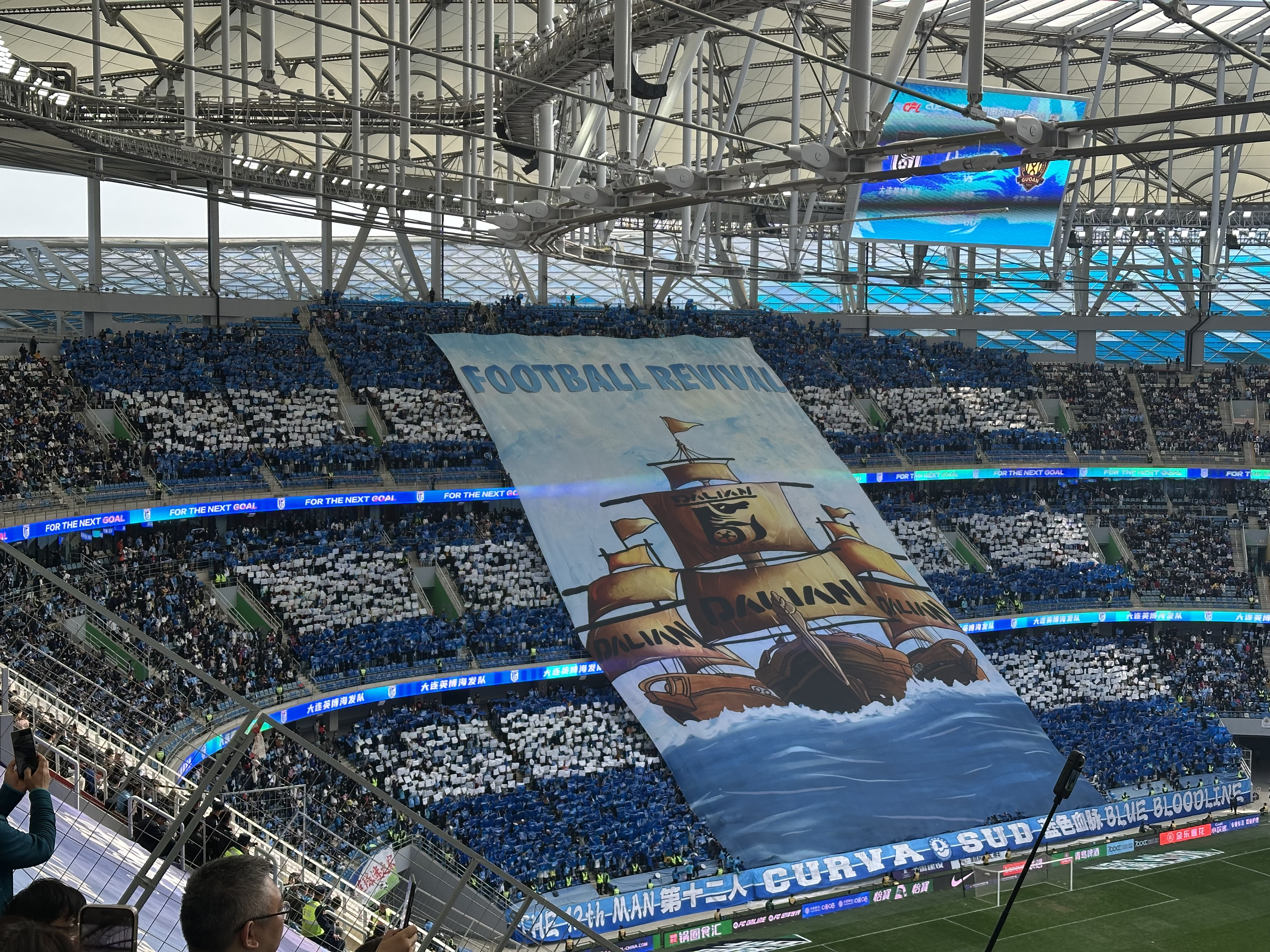
Tifo by Dalian Yingbo supporters ahead of a Chinese Super League match against Beijing Guoan in 2025

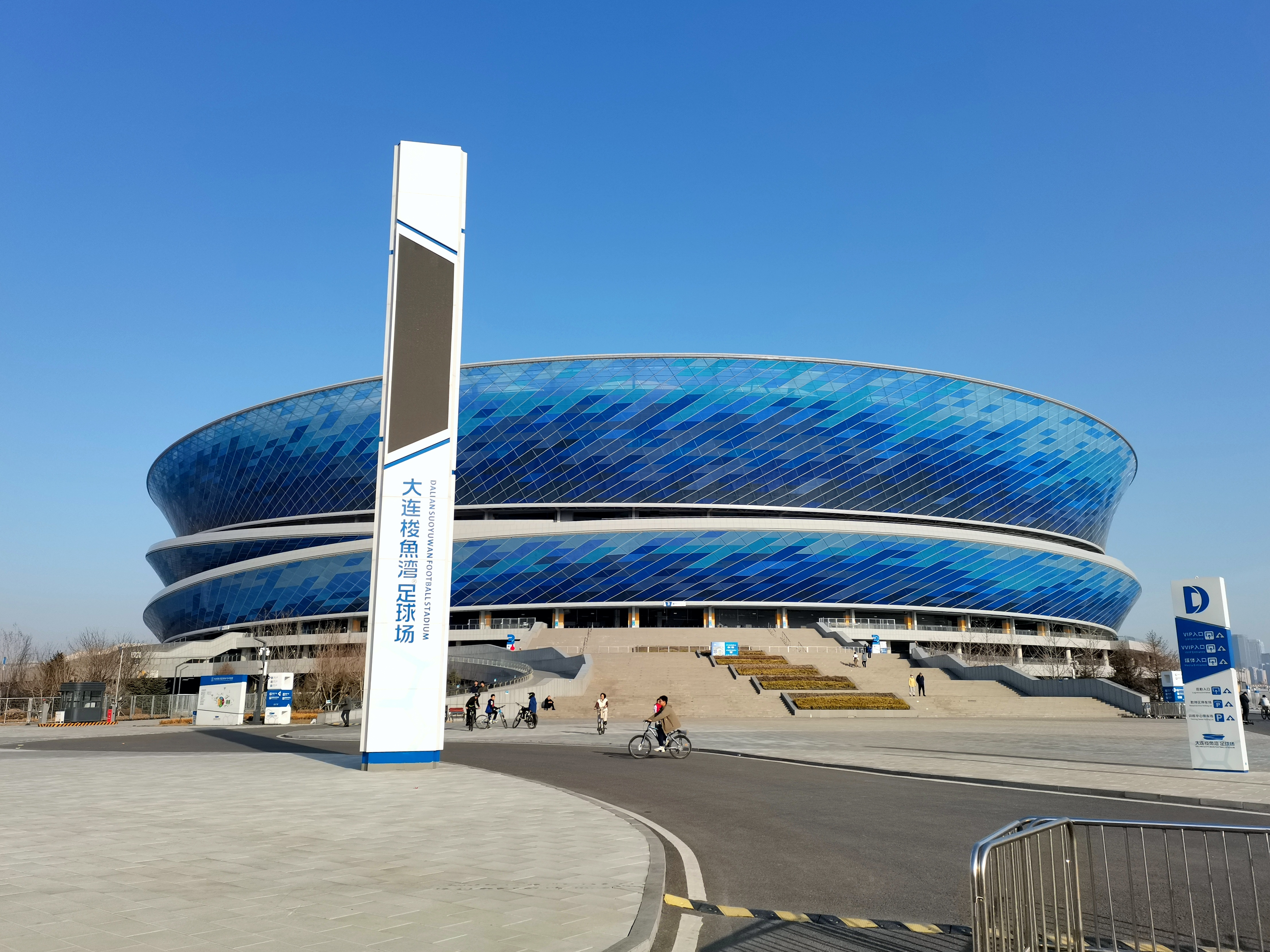
Exterior of the stadium
