= Dalian Yingbo F.C. =

Association football club in China

Dalian Yingbo 大连英博
- Full name: Dalian Yingbo Football Club 大连英博足球俱乐部
- Founded: 24 December 2021; 4 years ago (as Dalian Duxing F.C.)
- Ground: Dalian Suoyuwan Football Stadium
- Capacity: 63,677
- Owner(s): Dalian Tongshun Construction Co., Ltd.
- Chairman: Chen Dong
- Head coach: Li Guoxu
- League: Chinese Super League
- 2026: Chinese Super League, 1st of 16 (champions)
Home colours	Away colours

Dalian Yingbo Football Club (Chinese: 大连英博足球俱乐部; pinyin: Dàlián Yīngbó Zúqiú Jùlèbù), currently known as Dalian Yingbo Ocean Development (Chinese: 大连英博海发) for sponsorship reasons, is a Chinese professional football club based in Dalian, Liaoning, that competes in the Chinese Super League, the top tier of Chinese football. Dalian Yingbo plays its home matches at the Dalian Suoyuwan Football Stadium, located within Ganjingzi District.

== History ==
The team was founded on 24 December 2021 as Dalian Duxing Football Club (Chinese: 大连读行足球俱乐部) by a group of former Dalian Shide players led by Chen Dong, who became the club's general manager. The team attracted many Dalian players who previously played at local teams such as Dalian Aerbin and Dalian Transcendence, many of which had Chinese Super League appearances.

In the 2022 season, Dalian Duxing started in the Chinese Champions League. The team placed first in Group I of the regional competition and made it to the final round, where they finished third, and went on to win the promotion play-offs to acquire promotion into China League Two.

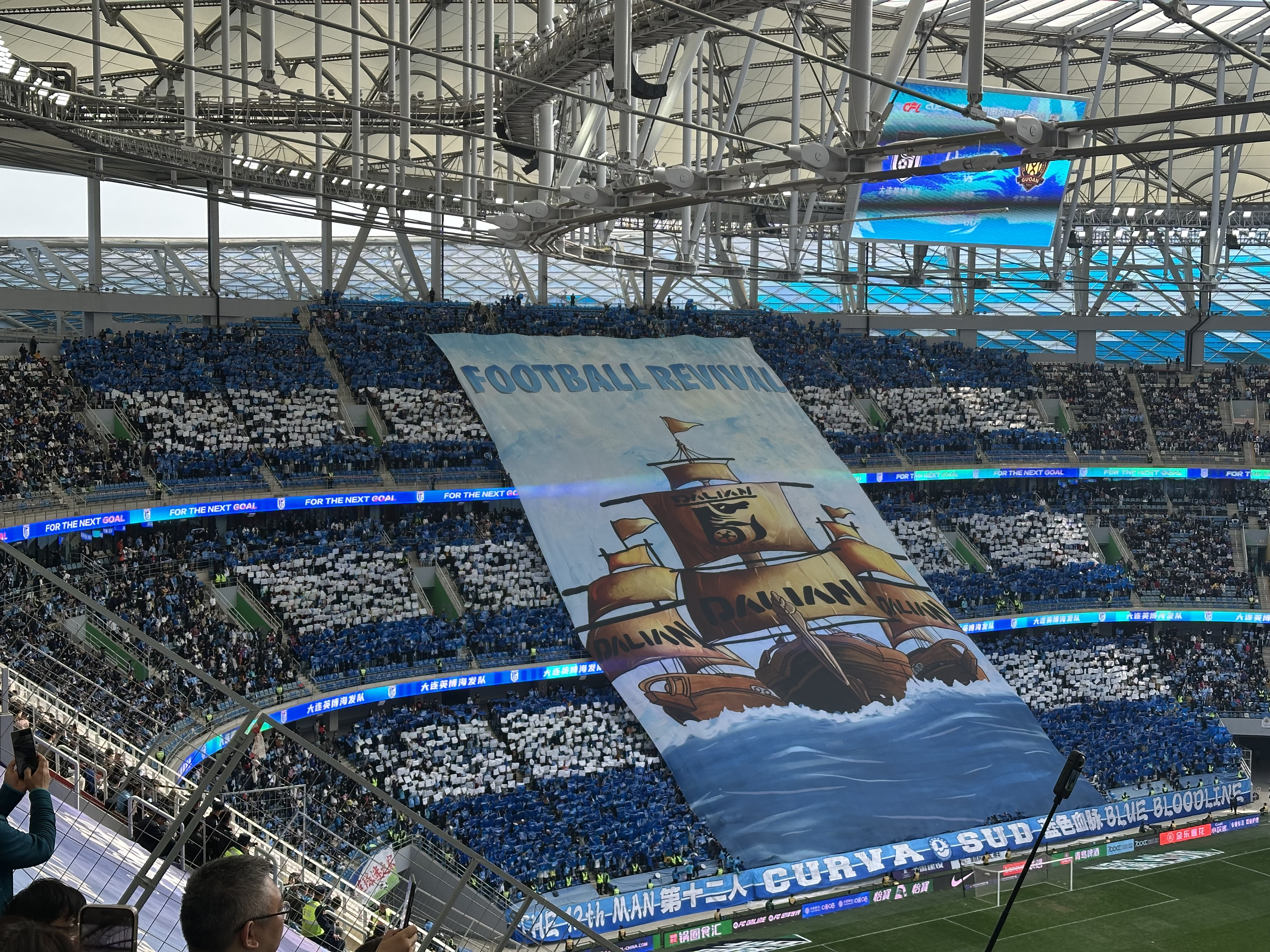
Tifo by Dalian Yingbo supporters ahead of a Chinese Super League match against Beijing Guoan in 2025

At the beginning of the 2023 season, the team changed to a neutralised name Dalian Zhixing Football Club (Chinese: 大连智行足球俱乐部), as requested by the Chinese Football Association, and signed more players from Dalian. Dalian Zhixing finished second in the 2023 China League Two season, to gain promotion into China League One. However, the investors of the team, the Dalian Shanhai Group, were involved in illegal fundraising cases. This meant that the club lost their funding, and was put into a forced auction in December 2023. On 15 December, it was confirmed that Dalian Tongshun Construction Engineering Co., which has run an amateur team Dalian Tongshun Construction F.C. since 2014, completed the acquisition.

On 29 January 2024, the team was renamed as Dalian Yingbo Football Club, which was adopted from a pool of names in a naming contest. The new owners completed the renaming process, obtained league registration, and recruited new players within a single month.

The club recorded the highest attendances in China League One history, with eight of the top ten best-attended matches in the division belonging to Dalian Yingbo. On 3 November 2024, in the final match of the season against Shanghai Jiading Huilong, Zhu Pengyu scored a header in the 90th minute to secure a 2–1 victory and confirm promotion to the Chinese Super League. The match was attended by 60,951 spectators, setting a new attendance record for China League One and becoming the second match in the division's history to exceed 60,000 attendees. The victory completed a three-level jump from the fourth tier to the top flight in three seasons.

Following promotion, the club underwent a mixed-ownership restructuring in December 2024. While Tongshun Group remained the controlling shareholder, two state-owned enterprises Dalian Zhangzidao Marine Development Group (海发集团) and Dalian Huipu Financial Holdings (汇融集团) joined as minority shareholders.

== Players ==
=== First-team squad ===
As of July 2026

Note: Flags indicate national team as defined under FIFA eligibility rules; some limited exceptions apply. Players may hold more than one non-FIFA nationality.

No.	Pos.	Nation	Player
1	GK	CHN	Ge Peng
2	DF	MLI	Mamadou Traoré
4	MF	MKD	Isnik Alimi
5	DF	CHN	Peng Shunjie
6	DF	CHN	Song Yue
7	MF	CHN	Luo Jing
8	FW	CHN	Zhang Huachen
9	MF	POR	Pedro Delgado (on loan from Shandong Taishan)
10	MF	ROU	Nicolae Stanciu
11	FW	SUI	Cephas Malele
12	MF	CHN	Feng Boxuan
15	DF	CHN	Wen Jiabao
16	FW	CHN	Zhu Pengyu
20	GK	CHN	Liu Weiguo
21	MF	CHN	Lü Peng

No.	Pos.	Nation	Player
22	MF	CHN	Mao Weijie
23	MF	CHN	Huang Shan
24	DF	CHN	Bi Jinhao
26	GK	CHN	Huang Zihao
27	DF	CHN	Yang Mingrui
28	MF	CHN	Sun Kangbo
30	FW	GHA	Frank Acheampong
32	GK	CHN	Wang Xiaofeng
33	DF	CHN	Cao Haiqing
37	DF	CHN	Zhang Chengrui
38	MF	CHN	Lü Zhuoyi
40	MF	CHN	Liao Jintao
44	FW	CHN	Feng Jin (on loan from Shanghai Port)
56	DF	CHN	Zeng Junhao
59	DF	CHN	Xiao Lirong

=== B-team squad ===
As of July 2026

Note: Flags indicate national team as defined under FIFA eligibility rules; some limited exceptions apply. Players may hold more than one non-FIFA nationality.

No.	Pos.	Nation	Player
5	DF	CHN	Peng Shunjie
7	MF	CHN	Piao Zhixun
8	FW	CHN	Zhang Shuai
9	FW	CHN	Wang Shengbo
10	MF	CHN	Muzapar Obuqasym
11	MF	CHN	Mao Wuda
12	DF	CHN	Nie Xin
17	MF	CHN	Zhu Yanpeng
18	MF	CHN	Wang Zhenghao
19	GK	CHN	Xiao Zhiren
23	MF	CHN	Huang Shan
25	MF	CHN	Liu Jincheng
27	DF	CHN	Yang Mingrui
29	MF	CHN	Jing Kuanjie
31	GK	CHN	Ding Xiangrui
34	DF	CHN	Mo Weihao
35	DF	CHN	Zhang Tao

No.	Pos.	Nation	Player
36	MF	CHN	Lin Shangyuan
37	DF	CHN	Zhang Chengrui
39	FW	CHN	Ma Mingwei
40	FW	CHN	Hu Mingyu
44	FW	CHN	Tursun Memet
45	MF	CHN	Liu Yi
46	MF	CHN	Wang Shixin
47	MF	CHN	Abdusalam Abdurehim
49	DF	CHN	Wu Xinze
50	FW	CHN	Lu Jiayi
51	DF	CHN	Yang Mingjie
55	DF	CHN	Wang Shicheng
56	DF	CHN	Zeng Junhao
57	DF	CHN	Li Gecan
58	MF	CHN	Umut Abibulla
59	DF	CHN	Xiao Lirong
60	MF	CHN	Imran Ibrahim

=== Out on loan ===
Note: Flags indicate national team as defined under FIFA eligibility rules; some limited exceptions apply. Players may hold more than one non-FIFA nationality.

No.	Pos.	Nation	Player
—	DF	CHN	Li Ang (at Wuhan Three Towns until 31 December 2026)
—	MF	CHN	Yan Yihan (at Dalian K'un City until 31 December 2026)

== Coaching staff ==
Position	Name
Head coach	(China) Li Guoxu
Assistant coach	(Australia) Marko Rudan
Assistant coach	(China) Li Gang
Assistant coach	(China) Liu Yujian
Assistant coach	(China) He Zehao
Goalkeeping coach	(China) Zang Yongliang
Fitness coach	(China) Zheng Tao
Fitness coach	(China) Zhao Haibin
B-Team head coach	(China) Zhou Ting
B-Team assistant coach	(China) Xu Ning
B-Team assistant coach	(China) Zhu Xiaogang
B-Team assistant coach	(China) Yan Xiangchuang
B-Team goalkeeping coach	(China) Yin Haibin

=== Head coach history ===
- (China) Li Guoxu (2022–present)

== Honours ==
- Chinese Super League
  - Winners: 2026
- China League One
  - Runners-up: 2024
- China League Two
  - Runners-up: 2023
- CMCL
  - Play-off winners: 2022

== Season-by-season record ==
Year	Division	Pld	W	D	L	GF	GA	GD	Pts	Pos.	FA Cup	Home stadium	Average attendance
2022	4	9	6	1	2	23	7	16	19	4th ↑	DNQ		
2023	3	22	14	5	3	30	12	18	47	2nd ↑	R2	Jinzhou Stadium	1,639
2024	2	30	17	6	7	44	29	15	57	2nd ↑	R3	Dalian Suoyuwan Football Stadium	42,187
2025	1	30	9	9	12	30	45	–15	36	11th	R16	Dalian Suoyuwan Football Stadium	58,268
2026	1	30	16	4	10	49	44	5	52	1st	SF	Dalian Suoyuwan Football Stadium	

Key
↑	Promoted

- DNQ = Did not qualify
- R2 = Second round
- R3 = Third round
- R16 = Round of 16
- SF = Semi-final
