= 2026 Chinese Super League =

23rd season of the Chinese Super League

Chinese Super League
- Season: 2026
- Dates: 6 March – 8 November
- Champions: Dalian Yingbo (1st title)
- Relegated: Wuhan Three Towns; Qingdao Hainiu
- AFC Champions League Elite: Dalian Yingbo
- AFC Champions League Two: Chengdu Rongcheng
- Matches: 240
- Goals: 762 (3.18 per match)
- Top goalscorer: (Democratic Republic of the Congo) Oscar Maritu (Yunnan Yukun) (20 goals)
- Biggest home win: Zhejiang 6–0 Yunnan Yukun (29 August); Shanghai Shenhua 7–1 Yunnan Yukun (10 October)
- Biggest away win: Zhejiang 0–5 Liaoning Tieren (24 May)
- Highest scoring: Chengdu Rongcheng 4–5 Shanghai Shenhua (22 August)
- Longest winning run: Chengdu Rongcheng (9 rounds, 4th to 12th)
- Longest unbeaten run: Beijing Guoan (16 rounds, 15th to 30th)
- Longest winless run: Qingdao Hainiu (14 rounds, 17th to 30th)
- Longest losing run: Qingdao Hainiu (12 rounds, 18th to 29th)
- Average attendance: 29,609

The 2026 Chinese Super League, also known as the 2026 C'estbon Chinese Football Super League (Chinese: 2026怡宝中国足球超级联赛) for sponsorship reasons, was the 23rd season since the establishment of the Chinese Super League.

== Teams ==
=== Club changes ===
==== To Super League ====
**Clubs promoted from 2025 China League One**

- Liaoning Tieren
- Chongqing Tonglianglong

==== From Super League ====
**Clubs relegated to 2026 China League One**

- Meizhou Hakka
- Changchun Yatai

=== Stadiums and locations ===
Locations of the 2026 Chinese Super League teams

Team	City	Stadium	Capacity	2025 season
Shanghai Port	Shanghai (Pudong)	Pudong Football Stadium	37,000	1st
Shanghai Shenhua	Shanghai (Xuhui)	Shanghai Stadium	72,436	2nd
Chengdu Rongcheng	Chengdu	Phoenix Hill Football Stadium	50,695	3rd
Beijing Guoan	Beijing	Workers' Stadium	68,000	4th
Shandong Taishan	Jinan	Jinan Olympic Sports Center Stadium	56,808	5th
Tianjin Jinmen Tiger	Tianjin	TEDA Soccer Stadium	36,390	6th
Tianjin Jinmen Tiger	Tianjin	Tianjin Olympic Centre	54,696	6th
Zhejiang	Hangzhou	Huanglong Sports Center Stadium	51,971	7th
Yunnan Yukun	Yuxi	Yuxi Plateau Sports Center Stadium	30,300	8th
Qingdao West Coast	Qingdao (Huangdao)	Qingdao West Coast University City Sports Center	27,000	9th
Henan	Zhengzhou	Hanghai Stadium	29,860	10th
Dalian Yingbo	Dalian	Dalian Suoyuwan Football Stadium	63,671	11th
Shenzhen Peng City	Shenzhen	Shenzhen Sports Center Stadium	45,000	12th
Wuhan Three Towns	Wuhan	Wuhan Sports Center Stadium	56,000	13th
Qingdao Hainiu	Qingdao (Chengyang)	Qingdao Youth Football Stadium	50,000	14th
Liaoning Tieren ^{P}	Shenyang	Tiexi Stadium	40,000	CL1, 1st
Chongqing Tonglianglong ^{P}	Chongqing	Longxing Football Stadium	60,295	CL1, 2nd
Chongqing Tonglianglong ^{P}	Chongqing	Tongliang Long Stadium	15,000	CL1, 2nd

=== Personnel and kits ===
Team	Manager	Captain	Kit manufacturer	Shirt sponsor (chest)
Beijing Guoan	(Scotland) Nick Montgomery	(China) Zhang Xizhe	(United States) Nike (Note: All CSL teams use Nike as kit manufacturer.)	Sinobo Group
Chengdu Rongcheng	(Australia) John Aloisi	(China) Wei Shihao	(United States) Nike	Epicland
Chongqing Tonglianglong	(China) Liu Jianye	(China) Xiang Yuwang	(United States) Nike	Southwest Securities
Dalian Yingbo	(China) Li Guoxu	(China) Lü Peng	(United States) Nike	Xiwang
Henan	(Portugal) Daniel Ramos	(China) Wang Shangyuan	(United States) Nike	Yangshao Wine
Liaoning Tieren	(South Korea) Seo Jung-won	(Japan) Takahiro Kunimoto	(United States) Nike	Xinglin Nanbo One; Shengjing Store
Qingdao Hainiu	(China) Zheng Long	(Serbia) Nemanja Anđelković	(United States) Nike	Laoshan Cola
Qingdao West Coast	(China) Zheng Zhi	(China) Sun Jie	(United States) Nike	Xihai'an New Area; Golden Beach Beer City
Shandong Taishan	(China) Tang Tian	(China) Wang Dalei	(United States) Nike	The Best Spring in the World
Shanghai Port	(Australia) Kevin Muscat	(China) Wu Lei	(United States) Nike	Bank of Shanghai
Shanghai Shenhua	(Serbia) Vladan Milojević	(China) Wu Xi	(United States) Nike	Bank of Communications
Shenzhen Peng City	(Scotland) Robbie Neilson	(Brazil) Wesley	(United States) Nike	Etihad Airways
Tianjin Jinmen Tiger	(China) Yu Genwei	(China) Wang Qiuming	(United States) Nike	Tianjin National Maritime Museum; TEDA Nangang Group
Wuhan Three Towns	(China) Deng Zhuoxiang (Note: As Deng Zhuoxiang does not hold an AFC Pro Licence, assistant coach Manolo Cano is officially registered as the head coach.)	(China) Liu Yiming	(United States) Nike	Huayuan Securities
Yunnan Yukun	(Spain) Jordi Vinyals	(China) Zhao Yuhao	(United States) Nike	Yunnan Yukun
Zhejiang	(Australia) Ross Aloisi	(China) Cheng Jin	(United States) Nike	Leapmotor

=== Managerial changes ===
Team	Outgoing manager	Manner of departure	Date of vacancy	Position in table	Incoming manager	Date of appointment
Chongqing Tonglianglong	(South Korea) Chang Woe-ryong	End of contract	12 December 2025	Pre-season	(China) Liu Jianye	14 December 2025
Chengdu Rongcheng	(South Korea) Seo Jung-won	End of contract	18 December 2025	Pre-season	(Australia) John Aloisi	6 January 2026
Qingdao Hainiu	(China) Li Xiaopeng	Mutual consent	22 December 2025	Pre-season	(Serbia) Milan Ristić	27 December 2025
Zhejiang	(Spain) Raúl Caneda	End of contract	22 December 2025	Pre-season	(Australia) Ross Aloisi	22 December 2025
Beijing Guoan	(Spain) Ramiro Amarelle (caretaker)	Signed by Shenzhen Juniors	23 December 2025	Pre-season	(Scotland) Nick Montgomery	8 January 2026
Qingdao West Coast	(Germany) Reiner Maurer (caretaker)	Signed by China	1 January 2026	Pre-season	(China) Zheng Zhi	3 January 2026
Yunnan Yukun	(Norway) Jørn Andersen	End of contract	1 January 2026	Pre-season	(Spain) Jordi Vinyals	3 January 2026
Wuhan Three Towns	(China) Deng Zhuoxiang (caretaker)	Change of role	2 January 2026	Pre-season	(Mexico) Benjamín Mora	2 January 2026
Liaoning Tieren	(China) Li Jinyu	Sacked	4 May 2026	9th	(South Korea) Seo Jung-won	6 May 2026
Wuhan Three Towns	(Mexico) Benjamín Mora	Sacked	8 May 2026	15th	(China) Deng Zhuoxiang (caretaker)	8 May 2026
Wuhan Three Towns	(China) Deng Zhuoxiang (caretaker)	End of caretaker spell	21 May 2026	15th	(Portugal) Ricardo Soares	21 May 2026
Shenzhen Peng City	(China) Chen Tao	Sacked	31 May 2026	9th	(Scotland) Robbie Neilson	6 June 2026
Shandong Taishan	(China) Han Peng (de facto)	Resigned	28 July 2026	6th	(China) Tang Tian (caretaker)	28 July 2026
Shandong Taishan	(China) Su Maozhen (de jure)	Resigned	28 July 2026	6th	(China) Tang Tian (caretaker)	28 July 2026
Shanghai Shenhua	(Russia) Leonid Slutsky	Resigned	2 August 2026	13th	(China) Mao Yijun (caretaker)	3 August 2026
Shanghai Shenhua	(China) Mao Yijun (caretaker)	End of caretaker spell	12 August 2026	13th	(Serbia) Vladan Milojević	13 August 2026
Wuhan Three Towns	(Portugal) Ricardo Soares	Mutual consent	6 October 2026	15th	(China) Deng Zhuoxiang	6 October 2026
Qingdao Hainiu	(Serbia) Milan Ristić	Sacked	6 November 2026	16th	(China) Zheng Long (caretaker)	6 November 2026

=== Foreign players ===
Teams that participate in the AFC competitions are allowed to register no more than two foreign players who can only compete in the AFC competitions.

- Players name in **bold** indicates the player is registered during the mid-season transfer window.
- Players in italics were out of the squad or left the club within the season, after the pre-season transfer window, or in the mid-season transfer window, and at least had one appearance.

Team	Player 1	Player 2	Player 3	Player 4	Player 5	Player 6 (Unregistered for league and AFC only)	Player 7 (AFC only)	Player 8 (AFC only)	Naturalised players	Hong Kong/Macau/Taiwan players^{1}	Unregistered players	Former players
Beijing Guoan	(Angola) Fábio Abreu	(Brazil) Dawhan	(Mali) Boubacar Konté	(Portugal) Guilherme Ramos	(Serbia) **Uroš Spajić**	(France) Béni Nkololo	(Democratic Republic of the Congo) **Chadrac Akolo**	(Tunisia) **Jeremy Dudziak**	(Brazil) → (China) Serginho^{2}	(Hong Kong) Yue Tze Nam		
Chengdu Rongcheng	(Brazil) Felipe	(Brazil) Matheus Jussa	(Brazil) Rômulo	(Brazil) Wellington Silva	(Russia) Yegor Sorokin	–	–		(Switzerland) → (China) Ming-yang Yang	(Hong Kong) Alexander Jojo		
Chongqing Tonglianglong	(Belgium) Landry Dimata	(Brazil) Lucão	(Cameroon) Michael Ngadeu-Ngadjui	(France) Ibrahim Amadou	(Romania) Alexandru Cîmpanu	–	–			(Hong Kong) Ng Yu Hei		
Dalian Yingbo	(Ghana) Frank Acheampong	(Mali) Mamadou Traoré	(North Macedonia) Isnik Alimi	(Romania) Nicolae Stanciu	(Switzerland) Cephas Malele	–	–		(Portugal) → (China) **Pedro Delgado**			
Henan	(Brazil) Bruno Nazário	(Brazil) Gustavo	(Brazil) Iago Maidana	(Brazil) Lucas Maia	(Brazil) **Pedro Maranhão**	–	–			(Hong Kong) Oliver Gerbig		(Spain) Jordi Mboula
Liaoning Tieren	(Brazil) Felipe	(Brazil) Jeffinho	(Republic of the Congo) Guy Mbenza	(Japan) Takahiro Kunimoto		–	–		(Belgium) → (China) Zheng Jiacheng	(Chinese Taipei) Ange Kouamé		(Sweden) Pavle Vagić
Qingdao Hainiu	(France) Malcom Edjouma	(Ghana) Yaw Yeboah	(Serbia) **Lazar Tufegdžić**	(Serbia) Nemanja Anđelković	(Sweden) Carlos Strandberg	–	–			(Hong Kong) Ngan Cheuk Pan	(Morocco) Ahmed El Messaoudi	
Qingdao West Coast	(Angola) Nélson da Luz	(Bosnia and Herzegovina) Samir Memišević	(Brazil) **Bruno Viana**	(Brazil) Davidson	(Ghana) Abdul-Aziz Yakubu	–	–			(Hong Kong) Barak Braunshtain	(Brazil) Rezende	
Shandong Taishan	(Brazil) Cryzan	(Brazil) Guilherme Madruga	(Brazil) Zeca	(Georgia (country)) Valeri Qazaishvili	(Portugal) Pedro Álvaro	–	–			(Hong Kong) Raphaël Merkies		(Portugal) → (China) Pedro Delgado
Shanghai Port	(Brazil) Leonardo	(Brazil) Mateus Vital	(Spain) **Óscar Melendo**	(Ghana) Prince Ampem	(Togo) Kodjo Aziangbe	(Brazil) Gabrielzinho	(Portugal) **Miguel Campos**	(Spain) **Jaume Grau**	(England) → (China) Tyias Browning^{2} (Spain) → (China) Alex Yang^{2}	(Hong Kong) Matt Orr		
Shanghai Shenhua	(Brazil) Rafael Ratão	(Equatorial Guinea) **Luís Asué**	(Portugal) João Carlos Teixeira	(Portugal) Wilson Manafá					(England) → (China) Nico Yennaris^{2}	(Hong Kong) Shinichi Chan	(Senegal) Makhtar Gueye	(Brazil) Saulo Mineiro
Shenzhen Peng City	(Albania) Albion Ademi	(Brazil) **Gabriel Xavier**	(Brazil) Wesley	(Israel) Eden Kartsev	(Netherlands) Deabeas Owusu-Sekyere	–	–		(Hong Kong) → (China) Dai Wai Tsun^{2} (Japan) → (China) Xia Dalong	(Chinese Taipei) Tim Chow	(Croatia) Filip Benković	
Tianjin Jinmen Tiger	(Brazil) Guilherme Schettine	(Portugal) Xadas	(Spain) Aitor Córdoba	(Spain) Alberto Quiles	(Spain) **Cristian Salvador**	–	–			(Hong Kong) Sun Ming Him		(Spain) Jaume Grau
Wuhan Three Towns	(Brazil) Adriano	(Brazil) Gustavo Sauer	(France) **Antoine Leautey**	(Guadeloupe) Kilian Bevis	(Venezuela) Jhonder Cádiz	–	–		(Italy) → (China) Denny Wang		(Cameroon) Basile Yamkam	
Yunnan Yukun	(Brazil) Caio Vinícius	(Brazil) Cléber	(Democratic Republic of the Congo) Oscar Maritu	(Romania) Alexandru Ioniță	(Romania) Andrei Burcă	–	–		(Norway) → (China) John Hou Sæter	(Hong Kong) Tsui Wang Kit		
Zhejiang	(Brazil) **Felippe Cardoso**	(Brazil) Lucas Possignolo	(Croatia) Marko Tolić	(Romania) Alexandru Mitriță	(South Korea) Park Jin-seob	–	–		(Gabon) → (China) Alexander N'Doumbou		(Venezuela) Saúl Guarirapa	

- **^1** For Hong Kong, Macau, or Taiwanese players, if they are non-naturalised and were registered as professional footballers in Hong Kong's, Macau's, or Chinese Taipei's football association for the first time, they are recognised as native players. Otherwise they are recognised as foreign players.
- **^2** Players who have already capped for a China senior or youth national team.

== League table ==
Pos	Team	Pld	W	D	L	GF	GA	GD	Pts	Qualification or relegation
1	Dalian Yingbo (C)	30	16	4	10	49	44	+5	52 (Note: Dalian Yingbo are ahead of Chengdu Rongcheng on head-to-head points: Dalian Yingbo 6, Chengdu Rongcheng 0)	Qualification for AFC Champions League Elite league stage
2	Chengdu Rongcheng	30	15	7	8	53	38	+15	52	Qualification for AFC Champions League Two group stage
3	Beijing Guoan (Note: Beijing Guoan had 5 points deducted for violation of sports ethics and loss of sportsmanship, engaging in improper transactions to seek illegitimate benefits.)	30	15	10	5	58	36	+22	50	
4	Shandong Taishan (Note: Shandong Taishan had 6 points deducted for violation of sports ethics and loss of sportsmanship, engaging in improper transactions to seek illegitimate benefits.)	30	16	5	9	60	49	+11	47	
5	Shanghai Port (Note: Shanghai Port had 5 points deducted for violation of sports ethics and loss of sportsmanship, engaging in improper transactions to seek illegitimate benefits.)	30	14	8	8	56	37	+19	45	
6	Yunnan Yukun	30	12	7	11	59	61	−2	43	
7	Shanghai Shenhua (Note: Shanghai Shenhua had 10 points deducted for violation of sports ethics and loss of sportsmanship, engaging in improper transactions to seek illegitimate benefits.)	30	15	5	10	67	50	+17	40	
8	Qingdao West Coast	30	8	15	7	32	42	−10	39	
9	Zhejiang (Note: Zhejiang had 5 points deducted for violation of sports ethics and loss of sportsmanship, engaging in improper transactions to seek illegitimate benefits.)	30	12	6	12	55	54	+1	37	
10	Chongqing Tonglianglong	30	8	12	10	31	35	−4	36	
11	Shenzhen Peng City	30	9	6	15	41	53	−12	33	
12	Tianjin Jinmen Tiger (Note: Tianjin Jinmen Tiger had 10 points deducted for violation of sports ethics and loss of sportsmanship, engaging in improper transactions to seek illegitimate benefits; serious breach of the principle of fair play, causing adverse social impact.)	30	11	8	11	40	38	+2	31	
13	Liaoning Tieren	30	8	5	17	42	58	−16	29	
14	Henan (Note: Henan had 6 points deducted for violation of sports ethics and loss of sportsmanship, engaging in improper transactions to seek illegitimate benefits.)	30	8	10	12	38	46	−8	28	
15	Wuhan Three Towns (Note: Wuhan Three Towns had 5 points deducted for violation of sports ethics and loss of sportsmanship, engaging in improper transactions to seek illegitimate benefits.) (R)	30	5	12	13	45	57	−12	22	Relegation to China League One
16	Qingdao Hainiu (Note: Qingdao Hainiu had 7 points deducted for violation of sports ethics and loss of sportsmanship, engaging in improper transactions to seek illegitimate benefits; serious breach of the principle of fair play, causing adverse social impact.) (R)	30	6	4	20	36	64	−28	15	Relegation to China League One

Source: Soccerway
Rules for classification:
- During season: 1) Points; 2) Head-to-head points; 3) Head-to-head goal difference; 4) Head-to-head goals scored; 5) Goal difference; 6) Goals scored; 7) Rankings in the previous season. (Rules 2 to 4 are only applied when teams concerned have finished both/all the matches against others.)
- After season: 1) Points; 2) Head-to-head points; 3) Head-to-head goal difference; 4) Head-to-head goals scored; 5) Goal difference; 6) Goals scored; 7) Disciplinary points (yellow card = 1 point, red card = 3 points); 8) Drawing of lots.
  (C) Champions; (R) Relegated
  Notes:

== Results ==
Home \ Away	BJG	CDR	CQT	DLY	HEN	LNT	QDH	QWC	SDT	SHP	SHS	SPC	TJT	WTT	YNY	ZHJ
Beijing Guoan	—	1–2	1–0	3–0	1–2	1–1	4–2	1–0	2–0	2–2	1–1	4–0	2–4	1–0	3–3	2–1
Chengdu Rongcheng	2–2	—	1–1	0–1	3–0	2–1	1–0	5–1	1–0	0–1	4–5	5–1	0–1	1–1	2–1	4–0
Chongqing Tonglianglong	2–3	3–3	—	0–1	1–1	1–0	2–0	1–1	1–1	2–3	1–3	2–0	1–0	2–1	0–0	1–1
Dalian Yingbo	1–1	2–0	1–0	—	2–1	1–0	2–1	2–3	3–1	1–0	1–4	3–1	3–1	3–2	1–3	3–0
Henan	3–4	0–0	1–1	1–1	—	4–0	5–1	0–0	0–1	1–2	0–3	1–0	0–1	1–1	2–1	0–2
Liaoning Tieren	2–1	0–1	3–1	0–1	4–4	—	2–1	0–1	1–5	3–2	3–1	1–2	3–0	1–1	1–2	2–4
Qingdao Hainiu	0–3	1–1	0–1	3–1	1–0	0–4	—	0–0	4–1	3–1	0–1	2–2	0–2	1–5	4–2	1–4
Qingdao West Coast	1–1	1–1	0–0	0–4	0–0	1–1	2–0	—	2–0	2–1	2–2	1–0	1–1	1–1	1–1	3–1
Shandong Taishan	2–1	3–2	3–1	1–2	1–2	3–0	3–1	1–1	—	1–1	4–1	1–1	2–1	3–3	4–3	5–0
Shanghai Port	0–0	3–0	1–2	1–1	1–2	6–1	2–1	4–1	0–1	—	2–0	1–1	1–1	4–0	2–1	2–2
Shanghai Shenhua	0–3	2–3	2–2	5–3	4–1	3–1	2–0	4–0	2–3	1–0	—	1–2	0–2	2–2	7–1	3–2
Shenzhen Peng City	0–1	2–3	2–0	1–1	2–2	1–0	3–2	3–0	1–2	0–1	2–1	—	1–0	5–2	3–4	1–1
Tianjin Jinmen Tiger	2–4	1–2	0–0	1–0	1–2	1–0	1–1	1–1	1–2	1–3	2–3	3–0	—	2–2	3–2	2–1
Wuhan Three Towns	0–2	0–1	1–0	4–1	1–1	2–2	1–3	2–2	3–5	2–3	1–3	2–0	0–0	—	1–1	2–0
Yunnan Yukun	3–3	1–0	1–1	3–1	2–1	5–0	3–1	2–3	4–0	2–2	1–0	4–3	0–3	2–1	—	1–2
Zhejiang	0–0	2–3	0–1	3–2	4–0	0–5	3–2	2–0	4–1	2–4	1–1	2–1	1–1	4–1	6–0	—

Legend: Blue = home team win; Yellow = draw; Red = away team win.
For upcoming matches, an "a" indicates there is an article about the rivalry between the two participants.

== Positions by round ==
To preserve chronological evolvements, any postponed matches are not included to the round at which they were originally scheduled, but added to the full round they were played immediately afterwards. For example, if a match is scheduled for round 7, but then played between rounds 8 and 9, it will be added to the standings for round 8.

Team ╲ Round	1	2	3	4	5	6	7	8	9	10	11	12	13	14	15	16	17	18	19	20	21	22	23	24	25	26	27	28	29	30
Dalian Yingbo	4	8	5	6	4	3	3	3	3	3	3	4	4	3	3	3	3	3	3	4	4	3	6	4	4	2	2	2	2	1
Chengdu Rongcheng	1	1	1	1	1	1	1	1	1	1	1	1	1	1	1	1	1	1	1	1	1	1	1	1	1	1	1	1	1	2
Beijing Guoan	8	13	12	12	13	13	10	11	13	10	11	8	9	13	10	7	6	7	7	8	7	6	2	2	2	3	3	3	3	3
Shandong Taishan	10	5	10	11	8	9	6	7	7	5	5	5	5	5	5	4	7	4	6	6	6	5	4	6	5	6	4	4	4	4
Shanghai Port	12	11	13	9	11	11	12	10	11	13	12	13	11	12	13	12	12	12	13	12	12	12	8	8	7	7	7	5	5	5
Yunnan Yukun	2	3	2	3	3	4	4	4	4	4	4	3	3	4	4	5	4	5	4	3	5	4	3	5	6	4	5	6	6	6
Shanghai Shenhua	14	14	14	14	10	8	5	5	5	6	6	7	8	11	12	11	9	11	11	13	13	13	10	9	9	8	8	8	8	7
Qingdao West Coast	5	9	6	7	7	7	9	9	8	9	10	6	7	6	6	6	5	6	5	5	2	2	5	3	3	5	6	7	7	8
Zhejiang	9	10	8	8	9	10	11	12	10	8	8	9	6	9	7	8	10	8	8	7	9	8	11	11	10	10	10	11	10	9
Chongqing Tonglianglong	3	2	3	2	2	2	2	2	2	2	2	2	2	2	2	2	2	2	2	2	3	7	7	7	8	9	9	9	9	10
Shenzhen Peng City	7	4	7	5	6	6	8	6	6	7	9	11	12	10	9	9	11	10	10	11	10	11	9	10	11	11	11	12	11	11
Tianjin Jinmen Tiger	16	16	16	16	16	16	16	16	16	16	16	16	16	16	16	16	15	15	15	14	14	14	14	14	14	14	12	10	12	12
Liaoning Tieren	6	7	4	4	5	5	7	8	9	12	13	14	13	8	8	10	8	9	9	10	8	9	12	12	13	13	14	13	13	13
Henan	11	6	9	10	12	12	13	13	12	14	14	12	10	7	11	13	13	13	12	9	11	10	13	13	12	12	13	14	14	14
Wuhan Three Towns	13	12	11	13	14	14	14	14	15	15	15	15	15	15	15	15	16	16	16	15	15	15	15	15	15	15	15	15	15	15
Qingdao Hainiu	15	15	15	15	15	15	15	15	14	11	7	10	14	14	14	14	14	14	14	16	16	16	16	16	16	16	16	16	16	16

Leader and qualification for AFC Champions League Elite league stage
Qualification for AFC Champions League Two group stage
Relegation to China League One

== Results by match played ==
Team ╲ Round	1	2	3	4	5	6	7	8	9	10	11	12	13	14	15	16	17	18	19	20	21	22	23	24	25	26	27	28	29	30
Beijing Guoan	W	L	D	L	L	D	W	L	D	W	D	W	D	L	W	W	W	W	D	D	W	W	W	D	D	D	W	W	W	W
Chengdu Rongcheng	W	W	D	W	W	W	W	W	W	W	W	W	L	L	W	W	D	D	D	D	D	L	W	L	W	D	L	L	L	L
Chongqing Tonglianglong	D	W	D	W	W	W	W	D	L	D	D	L	D	W	L	W	L	D	D	L	L	L	D	L	D	L	D	D	W	L
Dalian Yingbo	L	L	W	W	W	W	W	L	W	L	L	L	D	W	L	L	W	D	W	L	D	W	L	W	D	W	W	W	W	W
Henan	W	W	D	L	L	L	D	L	W	D	L	W	W	W	L	L	L	D	W	W	D	D	L	D	D	D	D	L	L	L
Liaoning Tieren	L	L	W	W	D	L	L	L	L	L	L	D	W	W	W	L	W	L	D	L	W	L	L	D	L	L	D	W	L	L
Qingdao Hainiu	L	L	L	W	D	D	L	W	W	W	W	L	L	L	L	W	D	L	L	L	L	L	L	L	L	L	L	L	L	D
Qingdao West Coast	L	L	W	L	D	D	D	D	D	D	D	W	D	W	D	W	W	L	D	W	W	D	D	W	D	D	L	L	D	L
Shandong Taishan	W	W	L	L	W	D	W	L	D	W	W	W	L	D	L	W	L	W	L	L	W	W	W	L	W	D	D	W	W	W
Shanghai Port	L	W	L	W	L	D	L	W	L	D	D	D	W	D	L	W	L	D	D	W	L	W	W	W	W	D	W	W	W	W
Shanghai Shenhua	W	D	D	W	W	W	W	W	L	L	D	L	D	L	D	W	W	L	L	L	L	W	W	W	L	W	W	W	L	W
Shenzhen Peng City	L	W	L	W	L	L	L	W	L	D	L	L	D	W	W	L	L	W	L	L	W	L	W	D	L	D	D	L	W	D
Tianjin Jinmen Tiger	D	L	L	L	D	W	L	W	D	D	D	L	L	D	W	L	W	W	W	W	W	L	L	D	D	W	W	W	L	L
Wuhan Three Towns	L	W	D	L	L	L	W	L	D	L	D	D	D	D	D	L	L	D	W	W	D	L	L	D	W	D	D	L	L	L
Yunnan Yukun	W	L	W	L	W	L	L	W	D	L	W	W	D	L	D	L	W	L	D	W	L	W	W	D	L	W	L	D	D	W
Zhejiang	W	D	W	L	L	D	L	L	W	W	D	D	W	L	W	L	L	W	D	W	L	W	L	D	W	L	L	L	W	W

W = Win; D = Draw; L = Loss

== Attendances ==
Chinese Super League clubs listed by average home league attendance, as of October 2026:

Pos	Club	Games	Average attendance
1	Dalian Yingbo	13	58,419
2	Beijing Guoan	13	47,188
3	Chengdu Rongcheng	14	41,367
4	Shanghai Shenhua	14	39,180
5	Chongqing Tonglianglong	14	35,731
6	Liaoning Tieren	14	29,626
7	Qingdao Hainiu	13	27,488
8	Tianjin Jinmen Tiger	14	27,295
9	Zhejiang Professional	14	26,503
10	Shandong Taishan	13	25,720
11	Wuhan Three Towns	13	24,259
12	Shanghai Port FC	13	20,972
13	Yunnan Yukun	13	20,893
14	Shenzhen Peng City	14	20,730
15	Henan FC	13	19,647
16	Qingdao West Coast	14	17,631

== See also ==
- 2026 China League One
- 2026 China League Two
- 2026 Chinese FA Cup
- 2026 Chinese FA Super Cup
