= 2025 AFC U-17 Asian Cup squads =

The following is a list of squads for each national team competing at the 2025 AFC U-17 Asian Cup. The tournament took place in Saudi Arabia, between 3–20 April 2025. It is the 20th U-17 age group competition organised by the Asian Football Confederation.

Players born between 1 January 2008 and 31 December 2010 are eligible to compete in the tournament. Each team has to register a squad of minimum 18 players and maximum 23 players, minimum three of whom must have been goalkeepers (Regulations Articles 26.3). The AFC announced the final lists on 29 March 2025. The full squad listings are below.

The age listed for each player is as of 3 April 2025, the first day of the tournament. A flag is included for coaches who are of a different nationality than their own national team. Players in bold have been capped at full international level.

== Group A ==
=== China ===
The final squad was announced on 30 March 2025.

Manager: (Japan) Kenichi Uemura

No.	Pos.	Player	Date of birth (age)	Club
1	GK	Li Ao	16 April 2008 (aged 16)	(Chinese Football Association) Tianjin Jinmen Tiger
2	DF	Jiang Zhiqin	16 January 2008 (aged 17)	(Chinese Football Association) Guangdong GZ-Power
3	DF	Wen Zhanlin	28 July 2008 (aged 16)	(Chinese Football Association) Meizhou Hakka
4	DF	Elnizar Lohman	14 April 2008 (aged 16)	(Chinese Football Association) Evergrande Football School
5	DF	Sun Tianyu	19 November 2008 (aged 16)	(Chinese Football Association) Hubei Istar
6	DF	Li Shuaiqi	8 September 2008 (aged 16)	(Chinese Football Association) Tianjin Jinmen Tiger
7	FW	Bunyamin Abdusalam	9 April 2008 (aged 16)	(Chinese Football Association) Evergrande Football School
8	MF	Liu Jiale	2 December 2008 (aged 16)	(Chinese Football Association) Evergrande Football School
9	FW	Wei Xiangxin	6 March 2008 (aged 17)	(Chinese Football Association) Meizhou Hakka
10	FW	Hebibilla Nurhaji	31 December 2008 (aged 16)	(Chinese Football Association) Chengdu Rongcheng
11	DF	Wang Yi	25 March 2008 (aged 17)	(Chinese Football Association) Shandong Taishan
12	DF	Wang Gengrui	16 September 2008 (aged 16)	(Chinese Football Association) Evergrande Football School
13	GK	Ihsen Ilham	8 August 2008 (aged 16)	(Chinese Football Association) Shandong Taishan
14	MF	Yao Junyu	9 January 2008 (aged 17)	(Chinese Football Association) Shandong Taishan
15	DF	Li Qitao	3 February 2008 (aged 17)	(Chinese Football Association) Guangdong GZ-Power
16	FW	Yang Qiandong	1 January 2008 (aged 17)	(Chinese Football Association) Evergrande Football School
17	FW	Wei Zijian	11 March 2008 (aged 17)	(Chinese Football Association) Zhejiang
18	FW	Li Xiang	13 January 2008 (aged 17)	(Chinese Football Association) Shandong Taishan
19	MF	Yan Yuzhe	27 February 2008 (aged 17)	(Chinese Football Association) The Affiliated High School of SCNU
20	GK	Wei Deliang	24 November 2008 (aged 16)	(Chinese Football Association) Hubei Istar
21	MF	Zhang Chengrui	15 March 2008 (aged 17)	(Chinese Football Association) Dalian FA
22	MF	Bian Yulang	10 May 2008 (aged 16)	(Chinese Football Association) Shanghai Port
23	MF	Liu Binglin	30 August 2008 (aged 16)	(Chinese Football Association) Evergrande Football School

=== Saudi Arabia ===
Manager: (Brazil) Mario Jorge

No.	Pos.	Player	Date of birth (age)	Club
1	GK	Mohammed Bo Khulaif	21 March 2008 (aged 17)	(Saudi Arabian Football Federation) Al Fateh
2	DF	Yazeed Aldosari	6 March 2008 (aged 17)	(Saudi Arabian Football Federation) Al-Shabab
3	DF	Nasser Alfihani	21 May 2008 (aged 16)	(Saudi Arabian Football Federation) Al-Ettifaq
4	DF	Turki Naji	29 December 2008 (aged 16)	(Saudi Arabian Football Federation) Al-Shabab
5	DF	Moayad Saleem	9 March 2008 (aged 17)	(Saudi Arabian Football Federation) Al-Faisaly
6	MF	Saeed Aldossari	30 January 2008 (aged 17)	(Saudi Arabian Football Federation) Al-Qadisiah
7	FW	Alwaleed Aloufi	5 December 2008 (aged 16)	(Saudi Arabian Football Federation) Al-Ittihad
8	FW	Thari Saeed	25 June 2008 (aged 16)	(Saudi Arabian Football Federation) Al-Hilal
9	FW	Abdulhadi Matari	28 February 2008 (aged 17)	(Saudi Arabian Football Federation) Al-Ittihad
10	MF	Abdulrahman Sufyani	15 April 2008 (aged 16)	(Saudi Arabian Football Federation) Al-Nassr
11	FW	Sabri Dahal	29 February 2008 (aged 17)	(Saudi Arabian Football Federation) Al-Fayha
12	DF	Adel Bin Hibah	4 February 2008 (aged 17)	(Saudi Arabian Football Federation) Al-Hilal
13	FW	Osama Aldaghmah	25 June 2008 (aged 16)	(Saudi Arabian Football Federation) Al-Ahli
14	DF	Abdulaziz Asiri	2 January 2008 (aged 17)	(Saudi Arabian Football Federation) Al-Hilal
15	DF	Mohammed Al-Qarni	24 May 2008 (aged 16)	(Saudi Arabian Football Federation) Al-Ittihad
16	MF	Habeeb Al Antaif	26 June 2008 (aged 16)	(Saudi Arabian Football Federation) Al-Nassr
17	FW	Salem Abdullah	7 April 2008 (aged 16)	(Saudi Arabian Football Federation) Al-Ahli
18	MF	Abdulaziz Alfawaz	28 March 2008 (aged 17)	(Saudi Arabian Football Federation) Al Fateh
19	FW	Mukhtar Barnawi	11 March 2008 (aged 17)	(Saudi Arabian Football Federation) Al-Hilal
20	DF	Abu Baker Saeed	18 December 2008 (aged 16)	(Saudi Arabian Football Federation) Al-Qadisiah
21	GK	Abdulrahman Alotaibi	5 February 2008 (aged 17)	(Saudi Arabian Football Federation) Al-Nassr
22	GK	Wafi Alaklubi	11 February 2008 (aged 17)	(Saudi Arabian Football Federation) Al-Qadisiah
23	MF	Maher Tawashi	2 April 2008 (aged 17)	(Saudi Arabian Football Federation) Al-Nassr

=== Thailand ===
Manager: Jadet Meelarp

No.	Pos.	Player	Date of birth (age)	Caps	Goals	Club
1	GK	Supakorn Poonphon	25 September 2008 (age 18)			(Football Association of Thailand) Nongbua Pitchaya
2	DF	Wathanyu Nairatsami	26 January 2008 (age 18)			(Football Association of Thailand) Chonburi
3	DF	Phuriphan Phothong	26 March 2008 (age 18)			(Football Association of Thailand) Muangthong United
4	DF	Phurinat Poolkamlang	5 February 2008 (age 18)			(Football Association of Thailand) Assumption College Thonburi
5	DF	Supawit Pasom	23 October 2008 (age 17)			(Football Association of Thailand) Assumption College Thonburi
6	MF	Danupon Bubpha (captain)	15 January 2008 (age 18)			(Football Association of Thailand) Assumption College Thonburi
7	FW	Natthakit Phosri	8 February 2008 (age 18)			(Football Association of Thailand) Port
8	MF	Panupong Pobsayai	30 October 2008 (age 17)			(Football Association of Thailand) Bangkok Christian College
9	FW	Chomphon Hombunma	17 January 2008 (age 18)			(Football Association of Thailand) Bangkok Christian College
10	MF	Chaiwat Ngoenma	25 February 2008 (age 18)			(Football Association of Thailand) Bangkok Christian College
11	FW	Poramet La-ongdee	8 June 2009 (age 17)			(Football Association of Thailand) Bangkok Christian College
12	MF	Sorakrit Kaewsri	28 February 2008 (age 18)			(Football Association of Thailand) Buriram United
13	FW	Phutanet Somjit	9 March 2008 (age 18)			(Football Association of Thailand) Port
14	FW	Silva Mexes	15 March 2010 (age 16)			(The Football Association) Manchester United
15	FW	Chinnapong Boonmak	2 May 2008 (age 18)			(Football Association of Thailand) Suankularb Wittayalai School
16	MF	Panupong Wan-on	14 February 2008 (age 18)			(Football Association of Thailand) Bangkok Christian College
17	FW	Siwakorn Phonsan	24 January 2008 (age 18)			(Football Association of Thailand) Nakhon Ratchasima Municipality
18	GK	Natthakorn Asavapichanchote	17 March 2008 (age 18)			(Football Association of Thailand) Buriram United
19	MF	Thatsataporn Phuengkusol	16 March 2009 (age 17)			(Football Association of Thailand) Wat Suthiwararam School
20	DF	Thunwisit Taman	9 December 2008 (age 17)			(Football Association of Thailand) Assumption College Sriracha
21	FW	Thirathep Rathaphol	21 March 2008 (age 18)			(Football Association of Thailand) Suankularb Wittayalai School
22	DF	Kanapoth Inthasingh	7 January 2008 (age 18)			(Football Association of Thailand) PTT Rayong
23	GK	Poomrapee Siribunyakul	23 July 2008 (age 18)			(Japan Football Association) Kashima Gakuen High School

=== Uzbekistan ===
The final squad was announced on 28 March 2025.

Manager: Islombek Ismoilov

No.	Pos.	Player	Date of birth (age)	Club
1	GK	Ibrokhim Shokirov	18 March 2008 (aged 17)	(Uzbekistan Football Association) Pakhtakor
2	DF	Hojiakbar Botiraliev	2 January 2008 (aged 17)	(Uzbekistan Football Association) Navbahor Namangan
3	DF	Muhammad Khakimov	4 October 2009 (aged 15)	(Uzbekistan Football Association) Pakhtakor
4	DF	Muminkhon Bakhodirkhonov	30 March 2008 (aged 17)	(Uzbekistan Football Association) Odil Ahmedov Football Academy
5	DF	Amirkhon Muradov	15 June 2008 (aged 16)	(Uzbekistan Football Association) Pakhtakor
6	DF	Miraziz Abdukarimov	11 May 2008 (aged 16)	(Uzbekistan Football Association) Pakhtakor
7	MF	Sadriddin Khasanov	21 May 2008 (aged 16)	(Uzbekistan Football Association) Bunyodkor
8	MF	Akbar Muhammadov	30 May 2008 (aged 16)	(Uzbekistan Football Association) Pakhtakor
9	FW	Nurbek Sarsenbaev	27 September 2008 (aged 16)	(Uzbekistan Football Association) Jayhun
10	MF	Mukhammad Khabibullaev	29 January 2008 (aged 17)	(Uzbekistan Football Association) Lokomotiv
11	MF	Sayfiddin Sodikov	27 June 2008 (aged 16)	(Uzbekistan Football Association) Odil Ahmedov Football Academy
12	GK	Bakhadir Izbaskanov	22 July 2008 (aged 16)	(Uzbekistan Football Association) Bunyodkor
13	DF	Abdulloh Fazliddinov	21 January 2008 (aged 17)	(Uzbekistan Football Association) AGMK
14	DF	Behruz Saidmurodov	9 February 2008 (aged 17)	(Uzbekistan Football Association) Pakhtakor
15	DF	Muhammadali Musakhanov	18 December 2008 (aged 16)	(Uzbekistan Football Association) Odil Ahmedov Football Academy
16	MF	Azizbek Abdumuminov	4 November 2008 (aged 16)	(Uzbekistan Football Association) Mash'al
17	MF	Jamshidbek Rustamov	26 March 2008 (aged 17)	(Uzbekistan Football Association) Odil Ahmedov Football Academy
18	MF	Abubakir Shukurullaev	2 February 2008 (aged 17)	(Uzbekistan Football Association) Pakhtakor
19	MF	Azizbek Erimbetov	4 April 2008 (aged 16)	(Uzbekistan Football Association) Jayhun
20	FW	Asilbek Aliev	1 January 2009 (aged 16)	(Uzbekistan Football Association) Odil Ahmedov Football Academy
21	GK	Nematulloh Rustamjonov	17 March 2008 (aged 17)	(Uzbekistan Football Association) Odil Ahmedov Football Academy
22	MF	Faridjon Abdullaev	13 August 2008 (aged 16)	(Uzbekistan Football Association) Tashkent FA
23	DF	Dilyorbek Makhmudjonov	3 December 2008 (aged 16)	(Uzbekistan Football Association) Andijon

== Group B ==
=== Australia ===
The final squad was announced on 21 March 2025.

Manager: Brad Maloney

No.	Pos.	Player	Date of birth (age)	Caps	Goals	Club
1	GK	Jai Ajanovic	31 August 2008 (aged 16)	11	0	(Football Australia) Central Coast Mariners
2	DF	Besian Kutleshi	28 February 2009 (aged 16)	9	0	(Football Australia) Western United
3	DF	Charlie Parkin	12 August 2008 (aged 16)	9	1	(Football Australia) Brisbane Roar
4	DF	Alexander Garbowski	22 February 2008 (aged 17)	8	2	(Swedish Football Association) BK Häcken
5	DF	Miles Milliner	10 August 2009 (aged 15)	4	0	(Football Australia) Manly United
6	MF	Haine Eames	27 February 2008 (aged 17)	2	0	(Football Australia) Central Coast Mariners
7	MF	Nickolas Alfaro	2 February 2008 (aged 17)	12	2	(Football Australia) Sydney FC
8	MF	Max Anastasio	30 April 2008 (aged 16)	10	5	(Italian Football Federation) Venezia
9	FW	Anthony Didulica	3 March 2008 (aged 17)	13	13	(Football Australia) Western United
10	MF	Quinn MacNicol	10 January 2008 (aged 17)	11	13	(Football Australia) Brisbane Roar
11	FW	Amlani Tatu	1 July 2008 (aged 16)	9	7	(Football Australia) Adelaide United
12	GK	Jonty Benfield	14 July 2008 (aged 16)	3	0	(Football Australia) Melbourne City
13	FW	Logan Sambrook	16 January 2008 (aged 17)	7	1	(Football Australia) Central Coast Mariners
14	DF	Zane Stevenson	16 February 2008 (aged 17)	3	1	(Football Australia) Western Sydney Wanderers
15	MF	Alex Bolton	12 May 2008 (aged 16)	10	0	(Football Australia) Perth Glory
16	DF	Isiah Boston	14 April 2008 (aged 16)	6	0	(Football Australia) Melbourne City
17	MF	Kade Baccus	30 March 2008 (aged 17)	1	0	(Football Australia) Western Sydney Wanderers
18	GK	Jared Williams	14 August 2008 (aged 16)	0	0	(Football Australia) Central Coast Mariners
19	MF	Jay Maltz	28 April 2008 (aged 16)	8	1	(Football Australia) Sydney FC
20	FW	Akol Akon	21 May 2009 (aged 15)	6	3	(Football Australia) Western Sydney Wanderers
21	FW	Rhys Williams	6 April 2008 (aged 16)	12	1	(Football Australia) Brisbane Roar
22	DF	Christian Pullella	23 January 2008 (aged 17)	9	0	(Football Australia) Perth Glory
23	DF	Thomas Cutuk	20 May 2008 (aged 16)	2	0	(Football Australia) Western Sydney Wanderers

=== Japan ===
Japan announced their final squad for the tournament on 17 March 2025. On 20 March, Mibuki Kasai withdrew due to injury, being replaced by Kaiki Kato.

Manager: Nozomi Hiroyama

No.	Pos.	Player	Date of birth (age)	Club
1	GK	Ethan Scally	8 June 2008 (aged 16)	(United States Soccer Federation) Los Angeles FC
2	DF	Asuto Fujita	22 November 2008 (aged 16)	(Japan Football Association) Kawasaki Frontale
3	MF	Haruto Tanaka	11 June 2008 (aged 16)	(Japan Football Association) FC Tokyo
4	DF	Shota Fujii	11 August 2008 (aged 16)	(Japan Football Association) Yokohama F. Marinos
5	DF	Kento Shinozaki	29 July 2008 (aged 16)	(Japan Football Association) Ichiritsu Funabashi High School
6	MF	Rento Noguchi	20 April 2008 (aged 16)	(Japan Football Association) Sanfrecce Hiroshima
7	MF	Kosuke Imai	10 February 2008 (aged 17)	(Japan Football Association) Tokyo Verdy
8	FW	Shimon Kobayashi	23 January 2008 (aged 17)	(Japan Football Association) Sanfrecce Hiroshima
9	MF	Kaiki Kato	25 February 2008 (aged 17)	(Japan Football Association) Yokohama F. Marinos
10	FW	Minato Yoshida	15 July 2008 (aged 16)	(Japan Football Association) Kashima Antlers
11	FW	Hiroto Asada	16 January 2008 (aged 17)	(Japan Football Association) Yokohama F. Marinos
12	GK	Ibuki Vincent Junior Ejike	31 December 2008 (aged 16)	(Japan Football Association) Sagan Tosu
13	MF	Fumiyoshi Kabayama	14 February 2008 (aged 17)	(Japan Football Association) Kokoku High School
14	MF	Taito Kanda	7 May 2008 (aged 16)	(Japan Football Association) RB Omiya Ardija
15	MF	Ryota Hariu	7 March 2008 (aged 17)	(Japan Football Association) Shimizu S-Pulse
16	MF	Kaiji Chonan	7 April 2009 (aged 15)	(Japan Football Association) Kashiwa Reysol
17	DF	Simon Yu Mendy	29 November 2008 (aged 16)	(Japan Football Association) RKU Kashiwa High School
18	FW	Daichi Tani	1 July 2008 (aged 16)	(Japan Football Association) Sagan Tosu
19	MF	Makoto Himeno	12 August 2008 (aged 16)	(Japan Football Association) JEF United Chiba
20	FW	Taiga Seguchi	10 January 2008 (aged 17)	(Japan Football Association) Vissel Kobe
21	DF	Yuya Yokoi	15 April 2008 (aged 16)	(Japan Football Association) Gamba Osaka
22	FW	Yuito Kamo	18 October 2008 (aged 16)	(Japan Football Association) Kashiwa Reysol
23	GK	Hiroto Matsuura	21 September 2008 (aged 16)	(Japan Football Association) Albirex Niigata

=== United Arab Emirates ===
The final squad was announced on 27 March 2025.

Manager: Majed Al-Zaabi

No.	Pos.	Player	Date of birth (age)	Club
1	GK	Mayed Mohamed	31 January 2008 (age 18)	(United Arab Emirates Football Association) Al-Wahda
2	DF	Houd Saleh	3 November 2008 (age 17)	(United Arab Emirates Football Association) Al-Jazira
3	DF	Ahmed Ekramy	11 October 2008 (age 17)	(United Arab Emirates Football Association) Al-Jazira
5	DF	Suhail Al-Noubi	10 August 2008 (age 18)	(United Arab Emirates Football Association) Al-Nasr
4	MF	Obaid Omran	23 January 2008 (age 18)	(United Arab Emirates Football Association) Sharjah
6	MF	Ibrahim Yousuf	27 May 2008 (age 18)	(United Arab Emirates Football Association) Al-Wasl
7	MF	Mohammed Gamal	3 August 2008 (age 18)	(United Arab Emirates Football Association) Al-Nasr
8	MF	Abdulla Rashed	12 March 2008 (age 18)	(United Arab Emirates Football Association) Al-Ain
9	FW	Mayed Adel	21 January 2008 (age 18)	(United Arab Emirates Football Association) Al-Nasr
10	FW	Faysal Mohammed	3 September 2008 (age 18)	(United Arab Emirates Football Association) Al-Wahda
11	FW	Mohamed Buti	30 January 2008 (age 18)	(United Arab Emirates Football Association) Shabab Al-Ahli
12	DF	Fahad Khalil	25 January 2008 (age 18)	(United Arab Emirates Football Association) Al-Nasr
13	DF	Salem Esam	2 December 2008 (age 17)	(United Arab Emirates Football Association) Al-Wasl
14	DF	Humaid Ibrahim	24 January 2008 (age 18)	(United Arab Emirates Football Association) Sharjah
15	FW	Jayden Adetiba	7 June 2009 (age 17)	(The Football Association) Arsenal
16	FW	Hazaa Faisal	10 February 2008 (age 18)	(United Arab Emirates Football Association) Al-Ain
17	GK	Mohammed Nasser	11 February 2008 (age 18)	(United Arab Emirates Football Association) Al-Wasl
18	MF	Ali Hassan	4 December 2008 (age 17)	(United Arab Emirates Football Association) Shabab Al-Ahli
19	MF	Mohammad Ahmad	31 March 2008 (age 18)	(United Arab Emirates Football Association) Shabab Al-Ahli
20	MF	Mohammad Salem	14 September 2008 (age 18)	(United Arab Emirates Football Association) Al-Nasr
21	MF	Abdalla Hatem	19 May 2008 (age 18)	(Egyptian Football Association) Al-Ahly
22	GK	Saeed Ali	18 April 2009 (age 17)	(United Arab Emirates Football Association) Sharjah
23	MF	Abdullah Mennad	2 October 2008 (age 18)	(United Arab Emirates Football Association) Sharjah

=== Vietnam ===
The final squad was announced on 31 March 2025.

Manager: (Brazil) Cristiano Roland

No.	Pos.	Player	Date of birth (age)	Club
1	GK	Hoa Xuân Tín	29 January 2008 (age 18)	(Vietnam Football Federation) Bà Rịa-Vũng Tàu
2	DF	Lê Quang Trường	23 June 2008 (age 18)	(Vietnam Football Federation) Hồng Lĩnh Hà Tĩnh
3	DF	Lê Huy Việt Anh (captain)	21 January 2008 (age 18)	(Vietnam Football Federation) PVF
4	DF	Nguyễn Hồng Quang	5 November 2008 (age 17)	(Vietnam Football Federation) Bà Rịa-Vũng Tàu
5	DF	Lê Tấn Dũng	27 January 2008 (age 18)	(Vietnam Football Federation) Bắc Ninh
6	MF	Nguyễn Đức Nhật	29 March 2008 (age 18)	(Vietnam Football Federation) PVF
7	FW	Hoàng Trọng Duy Khang	12 August 2008 (age 18)	(Vietnam Football Federation) PVF
8	MF	Đậu Hồng Phong	2 September 2008 (age 18)	(Vietnam Football Federation) Hà Nội
9	MF	Nguyễn Việt Long	28 January 2008 (age 18)	(Vietnam Football Federation) Hà Nội
10	FW	Trần Gia Bảo	3 January 2008 (age 18)	(Vietnam Football Federation) Hoàng Anh Gia Lai
11	FW	Nguyễn Văn Bách	8 February 2008 (age 18)	(Vietnam Football Federation) PVF
12	MF	Chu Ngọc Nguyễn Lực	28 July 2009 (age 17)	(Vietnam Football Federation) Hà Nội
13	GK	Trần Văn Đạt	25 April 2008 (age 18)	(Vietnam Football Federation) Sông Lam Nghệ An
14	DF	Phạm Đức Duy	11 December 2008 (age 17)	(Vietnam Football Federation) Hà Nội
15	MF	Bạch Trọng Dương	28 February 2008 (age 18)	(Vietnam Football Federation) Sông Lam Nghệ An
16	DF	Nguyễn Văn Quân	21 January 2008 (age 18)	(Vietnam Football Federation) Hà Nội
17	MF	Nguyễn Văn Khánh	5 November 2008 (age 17)	(Vietnam Football Federation) Hồng Lĩnh Hà Tĩnh
18	MF	Đặng Công Anh Kiệt	12 June 2008 (age 18)	(Vietnam Football Federation) Hà Nội
19	FW	Nguyễn Thiên Phú	25 January 2008 (age 18)	(Vietnam Football Federation) Hà Nội
20	FW	Nguyễn Văn Dương	6 October 2009 (age 16)	(Vietnam Football Federation) PVF
21	FW	Bùi Duy Đăng	22 January 2008 (age 18)	(Vietnam Football Federation) PVF
22	DF	Trần Đông Thức	30 September 2008 (age 18)	(Vietnam Football Federation) Sông Lam Nghệ An
23	GK	Nguyễn Văn Thăng Long	1 June 2008 (age 18)	(Vietnam Football Federation) Hà Nội

== Group C ==
=== Afghanistan ===
Manager: Elias Ahmad Manuocher

No.	Pos.	Player	Date of birth (age)	Club
1	GK	Fazluddin Amini	24 February 2008 (aged 17)	(Afghanistan Football Federation) Perozi Panjshir
2	DF	Shakeb Amiri	3 March 2008 (aged 17)	(Afghanistan Football Federation) Dawodzai
3	DF	Nawid Mahbobi	18 February 2008 (aged 17)	(Afghanistan Football Federation) Hamas
4	DF	Nasir Ahmad Mohammadi	19 March 2009 (aged 16)	(Afghanistan Football Federation) Maiwand
5	DF	Mohammad Nowrozi	26 July 2008 (aged 16)	(Afghanistan Football Federation) Maiwand
6	DF	Sayed Naveed Ullah Sadat	20 February 2008 (aged 17)	(Afghanistan Football Federation) Dawodzai
7	MF	Mohammad Milad Noori	31 January 2008 (aged 17)	(Afghanistan Football Federation) Maiwand
8	MF	Zamir Shoja	10 January 2010 (aged 15)	(Afghanistan Football Federation) Pirozi Panjsher
9	MF	Arash Ahmadi	11 February 2008 (aged 17)	(Afghanistan Football Federation) Maiwand
10	MF	Sahil Sarwari	22 February 2009 (aged 16)	(Afghanistan Football Federation) Hamas
11	MF	Mohammad Waris Shirzai	5 May 2008 (aged 16)	(Afghanistan Football Federation) Dawodzai
12	DF	Waisudden Walizada	24 February 2008 (aged 17)	(Afghanistan Football Federation) Perozi Kabul
13	MF	Nawid Ahmadi	17 January 2008 (aged 17)	(Afghanistan Football Federation) Jawanan Maihan
14	DF	Mohammad Waris Raziqi	10 March 2008 (aged 17)	(Afghanistan Football Federation) Jawanan Maihan
15	MF	Ezatullah Rahimi	15 February 2008 (aged 17)	(Afghanistan Football Federation) Sarafan Herat
16	MF	Basit Ibrahimi	20 March 2008 (aged 17)	(Afghanistan Football Federation) Sarafan Herat
17	MF	Yaser Safi	12 September 2008 (aged 16)	(Afghanistan Football Federation) Hamas
18	DF	Nazir Ahmad Niazi	28 April 2008 (aged 16)	(Afghanistan Football Federation) Maiwand
19	MF	Farhad Amiri	3 February 2008 (aged 17)	(Afghanistan Football Federation) Dawodzai
20	MF	Azamuddin Hajizada	6 March 2008 (aged 17)	(Afghanistan Football Federation) Istiqlal
21	MF	Mustafa Rezaie	20 May 2009 (aged 15)	(Afghanistan Football Federation) Dawodzai
22	GK	Abdul Rahem Rasuly	12 March 2008 (aged 17)	(Afghanistan Football Federation) Istiqlal
23	GK	Mohammad Muradi	8 February 2008 (aged 17)	(Afghanistan Football Federation) Maiwand

=== Indonesia ===
Manager: Nova Arianto

No.	Pos.	Player	Date of birth (age)	Caps	Goals	Club
1	GK	Rendy Razzaqu	8 January 2008 (age 18)	0	0	(Football Association of Indonesia) Nusantara United
2	DF	Dafa Zaidan	27 October 2008 (age 17)	8	1	(Football Association of Indonesia) Borneo Samarinda
3	DF	Ida Bagus Cahya	24 February 2008 (age 18)	4	1	(Football Association of Indonesia) Bali United
4	DF	Putu Panji (captain)	2 April 2008 (age 18)	9	1	(Football Association of Indonesia) Bali United
5	DF	Mathew Baker	13 May 2009 (age 17)	7	1	(Football Australia) Melbourne City
6	MF	Evandra Florasta	17 June 2008 (age 18)	8	4	(Football Association of Indonesia) Bhayangkara Presisi
7	FW	Zahaby Gholy	5 December 2008 (age 17)	9	7	(Football Association of Indonesia) Persija Jakarta
8	MF	Nazriel Alfaro	1 February 2008 (age 18)	7	0	(Football Association of Indonesia) Persib Bandung
9	FW	Mierza Firjatullah	15 February 2009 (age 17)	9	5	(Football Association of Indonesia) Persik Kediri
10	FW	Fadly Alberto	22 June 2008 (age 18)	8	2	(Football Association of Indonesia) Bhayangkara Presisi
11	MF	Fandi Ahmad	1 January 2008 (age 18)	7	1	(Football Association of Indonesia) Persija Jakarta
12	MF	Daniel Alfrido	12 March 2008 (age 18)	8	3	(Football Association of Indonesia) Persik Kediri
13	FW	Aldyansyah Taher	20 March 2008 (age 18)	4	2	(Football Association of Indonesia) PPOP DKI Jakarta
14	DF	Fabio Azka	29 February 2008 (age 18)	8	0	(Football Association of Indonesia) Persija Jakarta
15	MF	Ilham Romadhona	23 March 2008 (age 18)	7	1	(Football Association of Indonesia) Barito Putera
16	MF	Algazani Dwi Sugandi	6 January 2008 (age 18)	5	0	(Football Association of Indonesia) Persija Jakarta
17	FW	Rafi Rasyiq	30 November 2008 (age 17)	0	0	(Football Association of Indonesia) Semen Padang
18	MF	Fardan Farras	19 April 2009 (age 17)	0	0	(Football Association of Indonesia) Borneo Samarinda
19	DF	Putu Ekayana	11 January 2009 (age 17)	0	0	(Football Association of Indonesia) Bali United
20	FW	Josh Holong	1 April 2008 (age 18)	5	3	(Football Association of Indonesia) Adhyaksa Farmel
21	DF	Faaris Nurhidayat	7 July 2008 (age 18)	0	0	(Football Association of Indonesia) Persija Jakarta
22	GK	Rhaka Syafaka	11 February 2008 (age 18)	0	0	(Football Association of Indonesia) Persib Bandung
23	GK	Dafa Setiawarman	12 February 2008 (age 18)	6	0	(Football Association of Indonesia) Dewa United

=== South Korea ===
The final squad was announced on 21 March 2025.

Manager: Back Ki-tae

No.	Pos.	Player	Date of birth (age)	Caps	Goals	Club
1	GK	Park Do-hun	8 April 2008 (aged 16)	3	0	(Korea Football Association) Daegu
2	DF	Kim Min-chan	13 April 2008 (aged 16)	2	1	(Korea Football Association) Ulsan HD
3	DF	Kim Do-yeon	21 February 2008 (aged 17)	2	0	(Korea Football Association) Daejeon Hana Citizen
4	DF	Kim Chan-il	3 July 2008 (aged 16)	0	0	(Korea Football Association) Seongnam
5	DF	So Yoon-woo	10 May 2008 (aged 16)	2	0	(Korea Football Association) Chungnam Asan
6	MF	Lee Su-yoon	13 September 2008 (aged 16)	3	1	(Korea Football Association) Seongnam
7	MF	Kim Ji-sung	12 February 2008 (aged 17)	4	2	(Korea Football Association) Suwon Samsung Bluewings
8	MF	Park Byeong-chan	21 October 2008 (aged 16)	3	3	(Korea Football Association) Daejeon Hana Citizen
9	FW	Jung Hee-jung	17 September 2008 (aged 16)	0	0	(Korea Football Association) Bomulseom Namhae
10	MF	Kim Ye-geon	7 August 2008 (aged 16)	4	0	(Korea Football Association) Jeonbuk Hyundai Motors
11	MF	Jang Woo-sik	10 January 2008 (aged 17)	0	0	(Korea Football Association) Bucheon
12	GK	Heo Jae-won	21 May 2008 (aged 16)	1	0	(Korea Football Association) Jeju SK
13	DF	Lim Ye-chan	29 February 2008 (aged 17)	3	1	(Korea Football Association) Incheon United
14	MF	Kim Ji-hyuk	17 February 2008 (aged 17)	0	0	(Korea Football Association) Seongnam
15	DF	Jung Hui-seop	26 January 2008 (aged 17)	0	0	(Korea Football Association) Jeonbuk Hyundai Motors
16	MF	Oh Haram	12 January 2008 (aged 17)	4	1	(Korea Football Association) Jeonnam Dragons
17	MF	Jeong Hyeon-ung	16 February 2008 (aged 17)	0	0	(Korea Football Association) FC Seoul
18	FW	Park Seo-joon	30 April 2008 (aged 16)	0	0	(Korea Football Association) Daejeon Hana Citizen
19	FW	Kim Eun-seong	17 March 2008 (aged 17)	4	1	(Korea Football Association) Daedong Taxation High School
20	DF	Koo Hyeon-bin	9 December 2008 (aged 16)	4	0	(Korea Football Association) Incheon United
21	GK	Choi Juho	12 January 2008 (aged 17)	0	0	(Korea Football Association) Ulsan HD
22	DF	Ryu Hye-sung	20 February 2008 (aged 17)	2	0	(Korea Football Association) Ulsan HD
23	MF	Jin Geon-young	11 April 2008 (aged 16)	0	0	(Korea Football Association) Ansan Greeners

=== Yemen ===
The final squad was announced on 24 March 2025.

Manager: Samer Mohammed Fadhl Saleh

No.	Pos.	Player	Date of birth (age)	Club
1	GK	Muntaser Ghaleb	1 January 2008 (aged 17)	(Yemen Football Association) Al-Tali'aa Taizz
2	DF	Omar Atwy	25 December 2008 (aged 16)	(Yemen Football Association) Al-Ahli Aden
3	DF	Mohammed Al-Raawi	18 July 2008 (aged 16)	(Yemen Football Association) Shabab Joban
4	DF	Akram Kathei	15 October 2009 (aged 15)	(Yemen Football Association) Al-Shaab Sanaa
5	DF	Mohammed Al-Garash	1 April 2009 (aged 16)	(Yemen Football Association) Al-Ittihad
6	MF	Abdullah Saeed	18 January 2009 (aged 16)	(Yemen Football Association) Al-Ahli Aden
7	MF	Esam Al-Sakkaf	6 July 2010 (aged 14)	(Yemen Football Association) Al-Tilal
8	MF	Aiman Abdulrab	1 January 2008 (aged 17)	(Yemen Football Association) Al-Wehda Aden
9	DF	Karem Abdulatef	17 January 2010 (aged 15)	(Yemen Football Association) Al-Tilal
10	FW	Madyan Al-Ward	15 October 2010 (aged 14)	(Yemen Football Association) Al-Wehda Sanaa
11	FW	Tamer Al-Shaleli	18 November 2009 (aged 15)	(Yemen Football Association) Al-Wehda Sanaa
12	DF	Ahmed Aljledy	30 October 2009 (aged 15)	(Yemen Football Association) Al-Wehda Sanaa
13	MF	Ahmed Saeed	20 October 2009 (aged 15)	(Yemen Football Association) Al-Rasheed Taizz
14	MF	Ahmed Sheikh	9 November 2009 (aged 15)	(Yemen Football Association) Al-Wehda Aden
15	MF	Ali Daleeo	5 February 2008 (aged 17)	(Yemen Football Association) Al-Tilal
16	FW	Amgad Zaid	5 April 2009 (aged 15)	(Yemen Football Association) Al-Ittihad
17	DF	Sailan Sailan	9 February 2010 (aged 15)	(Yemen Football Association) Al-Shaab Sanaa
18	DF	Yunes Sheikh	5 March 2009 (aged 16)	(Yemen Football Association) Al-Jazeera
19	DF	Mohammed Ali Abdullah	17 May 2008 (aged 16)	(Yemen Football Association) Al-Shoulah
20	FW	Saqr Mohammed	16 April 2010 (aged 14)	(Yemen Football Association) Al-Wehda Aden
21	MF	Abdullah Abdullah	14 June 2008 (aged 16)	(Yemen Football Association) Al-Ahli Aden
22	GK	Anas Al-Douh	15 March 2010 (aged 15)	(Yemen Football Association) Al-Shoulah
23	GK	Wesam Al-Asbahi	3 June 2009 (aged 15)	(Yemen Football Association) Al-Ahli Sanaa

== Group D ==
=== Iran ===
Manager: Abbas Chamanyan

No.	Pos.	Player	Date of birth (age)	Club
1	GK	Yasin Zare	27 February 2008 (aged 17)	(Football Federation Islamic Republic of Iran) Persepolis
2	DF	Mohammad Amin Hosseini	30 July 2008 (aged 16)	(Football Federation Islamic Republic of Iran) Foolad
3	DF	Morteza Ali Baledi	9 January 2008 (aged 17)	(Football Federation Islamic Republic of Iran) Foolad
4	DF	Mohammadreza Bani Tamim	1 January 2008 (aged 17)	(Football Federation Islamic Republic of Iran) Foolad
5	DF	Abolfazl Kazemi	6 July 2008 (aged 16)	Unattached
6	MF	Mehdi Sahneh	17 August 2008 (aged 16)	(Football Federation Islamic Republic of Iran) Sepahan
7	MF	Erfan Yousefzadeh	24 March 2008 (aged 17)	(Football Federation Islamic Republic of Iran) Sepahan
8	MF	Mahan Zare	31 July 2008 (aged 16)	(Football Federation Islamic Republic of Iran) Zob Ahan
9	MF	Omid Gharahchomaghloo	27 January 2008 (aged 17)	(Football Federation Islamic Republic of Iran) Pars Borazjan
10	FW	Salman Ghafari	10 June 2008 (aged 16)	(Football Federation Islamic Republic of Iran) Mes Sarcheshmeh
11	FW	Erfan Khodadadian Miri	21 May 2008 (aged 16)	Unattached
12	GK	Mohammadali Moshabeh	1 January 2008 (aged 17)	(Football Federation Islamic Republic of Iran) Pars Borazjan
13	DF	Amirali Ashournezhad	13 May 2008 (aged 16)	(Football Federation Islamic Republic of Iran) Persepolis
14	DF	Morteza Savari	2 January 2008 (aged 17)	(Football Federation Islamic Republic of Iran) Foolad
15	DF	Eilya Hayajani	26 January 2008 (aged 17)	(Football Federation Islamic Republic of Iran) Sepahan
16	MF	Pourya Azadranjbar	24 April 2008 (aged 16)	(Football Federation Islamic Republic of Iran) Persepolis
17	MF	Mahan Alipour	24 December 2008 (aged 16)	(Football Federation Islamic Republic of Iran) Mehr Shiraz
18	DF	Arshia Moradi	29 May 2008 (aged 16)	(Football Federation Islamic Republic of Iran) Persepolis
19	MF	Mahan Beheshti	28 February 2009 (aged 16)	(Football Federation Islamic Republic of Iran) Malavan
20	FW	Ehsan Kheradpisheh	1 April 2008 (aged 17)	(Football Federation Islamic Republic of Iran) Paykan
21	DF	Mohammadreza Yousefi	7 March 2008 (aged 17)	(Football Federation Islamic Republic of Iran) Saad Abad Mashhad
22	GK	Abolfazl Khalilian	10 April 2008 (aged 16)	(Football Federation Islamic Republic of Iran) Sepahan
23	MF	Saber Fallah	1 August 2008 (aged 16)	Unattached

=== North Korea ===
Manager: O Thae-song

No.	Pos.	Player	Date of birth (age)	Club
1	GK	Jong Hyon-ju	9 March 2008 (age 18)	(DPR Korea Football Association) April 25
2	MF	Kang Myong-bom	17 March 2008 (age 18)	(DPR Korea Football Association) Ryomyong
3	DF	Choe Chung-hyok	30 January 2008 (age 18)	(DPR Korea Football Association) April 25
4	FW	Han Chung-guk	17 February 2009 (age 17)	(DPR Korea Football Association) Pyongyang City Football School
5	DF	Choe Song-hun	27 May 2008 (age 18)	(DPR Korea Football Association) April 25
6	MF	An Jin-sok	29 October 2008 (age 17)	(DPR Korea Football Association) Ryomyong
7	FW	Ri Kyong-bong	30 April 2008 (age 18)	(DPR Korea Football Association) April 25
8	MF	Ri Ro-gwon	18 July 2009 (age 17)	(DPR Korea Football Association) Ryomyong
9	MF	Pak Kwang-song	9 March 2008 (age 18)	(DPR Korea Football Association) April 25
10	FW	Kim Yu-jin	2 April 2008 (age 18)	(DPR Korea Football Association) April 25
11	FW	Ri Kang-rim	22 March 2008 (age 18)	(DPR Korea Football Association) Ryomyong
12	DF	Oh Won-mu	7 June 2009 (age 17)	(DPR Korea Football Association) Sobaeksu
13	MF	Ri Tae-myong	8 October 2008 (age 17)	(DPR Korea Football Association) April 25
14	MF	Kwak Tong-myong	30 January 2009 (age 17)	(DPR Korea Football Association) Pyongyang International Football School
15	DF	Kim Se-ung	1 July 2008 (age 18)	(DPR Korea Football Association) Ryomyong
16	MF	Paek Jin-gwang	5 January 2009 (age 17)	(DPR Korea Football Association) Pyongyang International Football School
17	MF	Kim Tae-guk	20 January 2009 (age 17)	(DPR Korea Football Association) April 25
18	GK	Min Chol-gyong	3 June 2008 (age 18)	(DPR Korea Football Association) Hwaebul
19	FW	Pak Ju-won	5 February 2009 (age 17)	(DPR Korea Football Association) Pyongyang International Football School
20	DF	Ri Kang-song	22 February 2008 (age 18)	(DPR Korea Football Association) April 25
21	GK	Jon Yong-un	18 November 2009 (age 16)	(DPR Korea Football Association) April 25
22	MF	Han Il-bok	30 August 2008 (age 18)	(DPR Korea Football Association) Kigwancha
23	DF	Yu Kuk-thae	27 January 2008 (age 18)	(DPR Korea Football Association) April 25

=== Oman ===
The final squad was announced on 30 March 2025.

Manager: Anwar Al Habsi

No.	Pos.	Player	Date of birth (age)	Club
1	GK	Ahmed Al-Rawahi	22 February 2008 (age 18)	(Oman Football Association) Al-Amerat
2	MF	Ebrahim Al-Shamsi	26 March 2008 (age 18)	(Oman Football Association) Fanja
3	MF	Mohammed Saleem	14 July 2008 (age 18)	(Oman Football Association) Salalah
4	DF	Al-Hassan Al-Qassmi	1 December 2008 (age 17)	(Oman Football Association) Muscat
5	DF	Fahad Al-Mashaikhi	7 December 2008 (age 17)	(Oman Football Association) Muscat
6	MF	Mohammed Al-Mashaykhi	14 June 2008 (age 18)	(Oman Football Association) Al-Amerat
7	MF	Mohammed Juma	13 April 2008 (age 18)	(Oman Football Association) Al-Mussanah
8	MF	Abdullah Al-Sadi	19 October 2009 (age 16)	(Oman Football Association) Al-Suwaiq
9	FW	Al-Walid Al-Rashidi	2 March 2008 (age 18)	(Oman Football Association) Nizwa
10	FW	Ahmed Al-Amrani	12 February 2008 (age 18)	(United Arab Emirates Football Association) Al-Ain
11	FW	Al-Yazan Al-Balushi	4 June 2008 (age 18)	(Oman Football Association) Al-Suwaiq
12	GK	Yazan Al-Khaldi	21 July 2008 (age 18)	(Oman Football Association) Al-Suwaiq
13	MF	Al-Waleed Al-Baraidai	30 March 2008 (age 18)	(Oman Football Association) Al-Suwaiq
14	DF	Ibrahim Al-Tamimi	30 March 2008 (age 18)	(Oman Football Association) Bosher
15	MF	Ziyad Al-Faraji	13 January 2008 (age 18)	(Oman Football Association) Bosher
16	MF	Abdullah Al-Wahaibi	24 January 2008 (age 18)	(Oman Football Association) Quriyat
17	MF	Al-Walid Salam	22 July 2008 (age 18)	(Oman Football Association) Saham
18	DF	Riyadh Al-Tarshi	21 July 2008 (age 18)	(Oman Football Association) Al-Mussanah
19	DF	Firas Al-Saadi	3 June 2008 (age 18)	(Oman Football Association) Al-Suwaiq
20	FW	Osama Al-Maamari	12 May 2008 (age 18)	(United Arab Emirates Football Association) Al-Wahda
21	MF	Abdulaziz Al-Balushi	21 July 2008 (age 18)	(Oman Football Association) Al-Khaburah
22	MF	Sulaiman Al-Kharusi	9 February 2008 (age 18)	(Oman Football Association) Bosher
23	GK	Ali Al-Ouweini	23 February 2008 (age 18)	(Oman Football Association) Saham

=== Tajikistan ===
Manager: (San Marino) Marco Ragini

No.	Pos.	Player	Date of birth (age)	Club
1	GK	Muhammadrahim Rahmonov	3 January 2009 (aged 16)	(Tajikistan Football Federation) Dushanbe-83
2	DF	Abdusamad Melikmurodov	24 June 2008 (aged 16)	(Tajikistan Football Federation) Sardor
3	DF	Sadriddin Sattorov	15 June 2009 (aged 15)	(Tajikistan Football Federation) Dushanbe-83
4	DF	Mehrojidin Rozykov	10 December 2008 (aged 16)	(Tajikistan Football Federation) Dushanbe-83
5	DF	Mustafo Hasanbekov	29 January 2009 (aged 16)	(Tajikistan Football Federation) Istiklol
6	MF	Bakhodur Nazarzoda	15 September 2008 (aged 16)	(Tajikistan Football Federation) Dushanbe-83
7	FW	Muhammad Nazriev	23 October 2008 (aged 16)	(Tajikistan Football Federation) Istiklol
8	DF	Ahmadjon Shoev	1 August 2008 (aged 16)	(Tajikistan Football Federation) Istiklol
9	MF	Abdullo Ibragimzoda	20 October 2008 (aged 16)	(Tajikistan Football Federation) Dushanbe-83
10	MF	Ramazon Bakhtaliev	24 October 2008 (aged 16)	(Tajikistan Football Federation) Istiklol
11	MF	Zarif Zarifzoda	13 November 2008 (aged 16)	(Tajikistan Football Federation) Dushanbe-83
12	DF	Shukhrat Nurmatov	13 May 2010 (aged 14)	(Tajikistan Football Federation) TFF Academy
13	MF	Parviz Bobonazarov	4 January 2009 (aged 16)	(Tajikistan Football Federation) Istiklol
14	DF	Muboriz Miskinshoev	23 February 2008 (aged 17)	(Tajikistan Football Federation) Istiklol
15	FW	Abduqayum Fuzailov	14 November 2008 (aged 16)	(Tajikistan Football Federation) Shodmon Ghissar
16	GK	Anushervon Kurbonzoda	11 January 2008 (aged 17)	(Tajikistan Football Federation) Dushanbe-83
17	FW	Nazrullo Ashuralizoda	5 July 2008 (aged 16)	(Tajikistan Football Federation) Dushanbe-83
18	MF	Umed Jafoev	10 October 2008 (aged 16)	Unattached
19	MF	Furqon Rahimzoda	25 August 2009 (aged 15)	(Tajikistan Football Federation) Dushanbe-83
20	MF	Haidarsho Khudoidodov	1 January 2008 (aged 17)	(Tajikistan Football Federation) Eskhata
21	MF	Mehrubon Odilzoda	15 September 2009 (aged 15)	(Tajikistan Football Federation) Istiklol
22	MF	David Maksudov	15 May 2008 (aged 16)	(Tajikistan Football Federation) Mohir
23	GK	Abubakr Rahmonqulov	5 September 2009 (aged 15)	(Tajikistan Football Federation) Dushanbe-83
