= Zhang Hongfu =

Chinese footballer

Personal information
- Date of birth: 22 August 2008 (age 18)
- Place of birth: Changchun, Jilin, China
- Height: 1.90 m (6 ft 3 in)
- Position: Centre-back

Team information
- Current team: Liaoning Tieren
- Number: 34

Youth career
- Evergrande Football School

Senior career*
Years	Team	Apps	(Gls)
2026–	Liaoning Tieren	12	(1)

International career^{‡}
2023–2024	China U16		
Medal record
Representing China
Men's football
EAFF U-15 Championship
Gold medal – first place	2023 China	Team
- * Club domestic league appearances and goals as of 21 July 2026 ‡ National team caps and goals as of 21 July 2026

Zhang Hongfu (simplified Chinese: 张洪福; traditional Chinese: 張洪福; pinyin: Zhāng Hóngfú; born 22 August 2008) is a Chinese professional footballer who plays as a centre-back for Chinese Super League club Liaoning Tieren.

== Early life and youth career ==
Zhang was born on 22 August 2008 in Changchun Jilin, China. His mother is Chinese and his father is Tanzanian. He joined the Evergrande Football School at a young age and progressed through the club's youth academy.

During the 2022–23 season, Zhang was selected for overseas training and registered with Moratalaz Sports School U16B in Spain, competing in the Madrid U16 Regional League (Tier 3). He made 10 appearances, 6 starts, and scored 1 goal. He also played 3 matches (2 starts) for Moratalaz U16A in the Madrid U16 Honor League (Tier 2). In the season break, he won the Madrid Youth Cup (Semana Santa) U16 title with Moratalaz.

In August 2022, Zhang represented Qingyuan in the Guangdong Provincial 16th Games, winning the gold medal in the men's football U14 category.

In October 2023, as captain of the Evergrande Football School U15 team, Zhang led the team to the national final of the China Youth Football League (U15 group), where they lost to Shandong Taishan U15.

== Club career ==
=== Guangzhou ===
In 2024, Zhang was promoted to the first team of Guangzhou F.C. to compete in the China League One. In October 2024, he scored 3 goals in the 2024 Chinese Football Association Youth Football Championship (Professional Club U17 Group), helping Guangzhou U17 finish third, and was voted the tournament's best player by the 16 team head coaches and match supervisors.

In 2025, Zhang won the Chinese Youth Football Elite League (Division U-17) title with Evergrande Football School U17.

=== Liaoning Tieren ===
On 27 February 2026, Liaoning Tieren officially announced the signing of Zhang from Evergrande Football School. The transfer fee was reported to be approximately 1 million yuan.

On 4 July 2026, in the 17th round of the Chinese Super League, Zhang made his professional debut in a 3–1 home victory over Chongqing Tongliang Long, starting and playing the full match.

== International career ==
In August 2023, Zhang was called up to the China U15 national team for the 2023 East Asian Football Federation U15 Men's Football Championship held from 1 to 8 September. On 4 September, he scored two goals in a 23–0 victory over Northern Mariana Islands. On 8 September, in the final against Japan, he scored in the penalty shootout as China won 4–2 to claim the championship. He was named the tournament's best defender.

In May 2024, Zhang was selected for the U-16 national team training camp. In July 2024, he was named in the China U16 squad for the sixth training camp and the Peace Cup international invitational tournament in Shenyang. However, he was subsequently excluded from later U16 national team training camps due to repeated violations of team rules and discipline.

== Career statistics ==
=== Club ===
As of 21 July 2026

Appearances and goals by club, season and competition
Club	Season	League			National Cup		Continental		Other		Total	
Club	Season	Division	Apps	Goals	Apps	Goals	Apps	Goals	Apps	Goals	Apps	Goals
Liaoning Tieren	2026	Chinese Super League	2	0	0	0	—		—		2	0
Career total			2	0	0	0	0	0	0	0	2	0
