= 2023 EAFF U-15 Men's Championship =

EAFF U-15 Men's Championship China 2023

Tournament details
- Host country: China
- Dates: 1–8 September
- Teams: 9 (from 1 sub-confederation)
- Venue: 3 (in 1 host city)

Final positions
- Champions: China (1st title)
- Runners-up: Japan
- Third place: South Korea
- Fourth place: Chinese Taipei

Tournament statistics
- Matches played: 22
- Goals scored: 204 (9.27 per match)
- Top scorer(s): (Chinese Taipei) Jhang Tian-yun (11 goals)
- Best player: (China) Liu Binglin
- Best goalkeeper: (China) Zhang Congxi

The 2023 EAFF U-15 Men's Championship was the inaugural edition of the EAFF U-15 Men's Championship, organised by the East Asian Football Federation (EAFF). The tournament took place from 1 to 8 September in Qingdao, China. A total nine national teams competed in the tournament.

Hosts China won the first title in the tournament, beating Japan on penalties.

== Qualified teams ==
There was no qualification phase, thus all ten available members are allowed to compete. Only North Korea didn't send a team to the tournament.

Team	Association
China	Chinese FA
Chinese Taipei	Chinese Taipei FA
Guam	Guam FA
Hong Kong	Hong Kong FA
Japan	Japan FA
South Korea	Korea FA
Macau	Macau FA
Mongolia	Mongolian FF
Northern Mariana Islands	Northern Mariana Islands FA

Did not enter
North Korea

== Squads ==
A final squad of 20 players (three of whom must be goalkeepers) must be registered one day before the first match of the tournament.

== Venues ==
Qingdao
Qingdao Youth Stadium	Pitch 9 Qingdao Baisha Bay Football Centre	Pitch 2 Qingdao Citizen Fitness Center
Capacity: 50,000	Capacity: 1,000	Capacity: 1,000

== Group stage ==
All times are local, CST (UTC+8).

=== Group A ===
Pos	Team	Pld	W	D	L	GF	GA	GD	Pts	Qualification
1	China (H)	4	3	1	0	43	1	+42	10	Knockout stage
2	South Korea	4	3	1	0	39	1	+38	10	Knockout stage
3	Mongolia	4	2	0	2	9	12	−3	6	
4	Macau	4	1	0	3	5	29	−24	3	
5	Northern Mariana Islands	4	0	0	4	2	55	−53	0	

Source: EAFF
Rules for classification: 1) points; 2) head-to-head; 3) goal difference; 4) goals scored; 5) penalty shoot-out; 6) disciplinary points; 7) drawing of lots.
(H) Hosts
1 September 2023
10:00

Northern Mariana Islands	0–4	Mongolia
	Report	Nandin-Erdene 1'; Turbat 14'; Otgonkhuyag 17'; Khishigjargal 86'

Pitch 9 Qingdao Baisha Bay Football Centre, Qingdao
Attendance: 32
Referee: He Yuhang (China)
1 September 2023
10:00

Macau	0–13	China
	Report	Shang Tianyu 9'; Bunyamin 13'; Wang Yi 17'; Wang Gengrui 86'; Yang Qiandong 34', 47', 73'; Hu Xiwen 65', 75'; Bian Yulang 86'; Du Junhao 88'; Wang Weixuan 90+2'

Pitch 2 Qingdao Citizen Fitness Center, Qingdao
Attendance: 100
Referee: Maher Al-Ali (Lebanon)

2 September 2023
10:00

Mongolia	0–6	South Korea
	Report	Kim Ye-geon 32' (pen.); Jang Yo-han 47', 56'; Battumur 50' (o.g.); Kim Se-bin 82'; Kang Min-jun 90+5'

Pitch 2 Qingdao Citizen Fitness Center, Qingdao
Attendance: 53
Referee: Yang Ping (China)
2 September 2023
15:00

Northern Mariana Islands	2–5	Macau
Lizama 5', 28'	Report	Ung U Hin 13', 56', 69'; Chao Chi Hou 87'; Ng Kuan Hou 89'

Pitch 2 Qingdao Citizen Fitness Center, Qingdao
Attendance: 24
Referee: Xie Jiaqi (China)

3 September 2023
15:00

South Korea	23–0	Northern Mariana Islands
Kang Min-jun 2', 24', 44', 50', 71'; Jang Yo-han 6', 15', 42'; Park Jung-ho 16', 18', 40'; Heo Hwan 20', 61'; Shim Woo-sol 23'; Kim Min-jun 25', 45'; Lee Gang-hyeon 57', 81', 88'; Kim Ye-geon 74', 83', 90+2'; Kim Seung-hyun 76'	Report

Pitch 9 Qingdao Baisha Bay Football Centre, Qingdao
Attendance: 28
Referee: Gao Wenqing (China)
3 September 2023
15:00

China	6–0	Mongolia
Yang Shuo 26'; Yao Junyu 45', 48'; Wang Weixuan 75'; Han Yiheng 89'; Shao Mingzhen 90+5'	Report

Pitch 2 Qingdao Citizen Fitness Center, Qingdao
Attendance: 80
Referee: Nurzatbek Abdykadyrov (Kyrgyzstan)

4 September 2023
10:00

China	23–0	Northern Mariana Islands
Hu Xiwen 3', 4', 11', 48', 63'; Wang Weixuan 6'; Yang Shuo 8'; Yang Qiandong 9', 44', 45+1'; Liu Jiale 16', 39', 42'; Wang Yi 50', 61'; Wang Gengrui 53'; Li Xiang 55', 57'; Zhang Hongfu 73', 90'	Report

Pitch 9 Qingdao Baisha Bay Football Centre, Qingdao
Attendance: 80
Referee: Xie Jiaqi (China)
4 September 2023
15:00

Macau	0–9	South Korea
	Report	Kim Ye-geon 19', 45+3'; Kim Se-bin 23'; Oh Taek-yung 33'; Jang Yo-han 51'; Kim Min-jun 61'; Lee Sang-yeon 64'; Kang Min-jun 79'; Han Jun-hee 84'

Pitch 9 Qingdao Baisha Bay Football Centre, Qingdao
Attendance: 36
Referee: Yang Ping (China)

5 September 2023
15:00

Mongolia	5–0	Macau
Bolorbold 18', 25'; Otgonkhuyag 20'; Baasanjav 47'; Baasandorj 80'	Report

Pitch 9 Qingdao Baisha Bay Football Centre, Qingdao
Attendance: 18
Referee: He Yuhang (China)
5 September 2023
15:00

South Korea	1–1	China
Jang Yo-han 34'	Report	Yang Qiandong 25'

Pitch 2 Qingdao Citizen Fitness Center, Qingdao
Attendance: 85
Referee: Nurzatbek Abdykadyrov (Kyrgyzstan)

=== Group B ===
Pos	Team	Pld	W	D	L	GF	GA	GD	Pts	Qualification
1	Japan	3	3	0	0	38	3	+35	9	Knockout stage
2	Chinese Taipei	3	2	0	1	21	4	+17	6	Knockout stage
3	Hong Kong	3	1	0	2	25	12	+13	3	
4	Guam	3	0	0	3	1	66	−65	0	

Source: EAFF
Rules for classification: 1) points; 2) head-to-head; 3) goal difference; 4) goals scored; 5) penalty shoot-out; 6) disciplinary points; 7) drawing of lots.
1 September 2023
15:00

Hong Kong	1–2	Chinese Taipei
Gao Ming Ho 68'	Report	Jhang Tian-yun 36', 58'

Pitch 9 Qingdao Baisha Bay Football Centre, Qingdao
Attendance: 23
Referee: Yang Can (China)
1 September 2023
15:00

Japan	26–0	Guam
Hara 2', 20', 36', 45+1'; Ogawa 3'; Urakawa 6', 22', 39', 45', 54'; Fushihara 11' (pen.); Sasaki 18' (pen.), 40', 43'; Nagano 47', 65'; Kashu 48'; Yoshida 53', 73'; Nobushige 61', 62', 72', 82', 88'; Taka 78', 85'	Report

Pitch 2 Qingdao Citizen Fitness Center, Qingdao
Attendance: 30
Referee: Yang Yizhou (China)

3 September 2023
10:00

Guam	0–21	Hong Kong
	Report	Fung Tin Wing 3', 11'; Sin Wai Kiu 7'; Yiu Tsz Leong 13', 39', 39', 40', 45', 50', 67', 90+3'; Li Siu Hin 19', 28', 30', 32', 37', 44'; Gao Ming Ho 53'; Verkade 90+2'

Pitch 9 Qingdao Baisha Bay Football Centre, Qingdao
Referee: Yang Yizhou (China)
3 September 2023
10:00

Chinese Taipei	0–2	Japan
	Report	Taka 11'; Nobushige 21'

Pitch 2 Qingdao Citizen Fitness Center, Qingdao
Attendance: 31
Referee: Maher Al-Ali (Lebanon)

5 September 2023
10:00

Japan	10–3	Hong Kong
Taka 34', 43', 45+1' (pen.), 62'; Otake 47', 90+2'; Urakawa 54'; Hara 73'; Sasaki 77', 87'	Report	Chin 10' (pen.); Yiu Tsz Leong 14'; Choi Long Hei 38'

Pitch 9 Qingdao Baisha Bay Football Centre, Qingdao
Attendance: 68
Referee: Maher Al-Ali (Lebanon)
5 September 2023
10:00

Chinese Taipei	19–1	Guam
Lu Yi-hung 2', 25'; Sung Chi-chan 6'; Tai Zih-han 8', 14'; Kao Yuan-yu 11', 45'; Ku Cheng-hao 49'; Jhang Tian-yun 56', 61', 63', 70', 73', 81', 85', 89', 90+2'; Ating 90+4'	Report	Rink 47'

Pitch 2 Qingdao Citizen Fitness Center, Qingdao
Attendance: 50
Referee: Gao Wenqing (China)

== Ranking games ==
The teams that failed to reach the knock-out stage played an additional game to determine their final ranking in the competition.

All times are local CST

=== Seventh place play-off ===
7 September 2023
15:00

Macau	3–0	Guam
Chong Chon Iat 44'; Ng Kuan Hou 49', 53'	Report

Pitch 9 Qingdao Baisha Bay Football Centre, Qingdao
Attendance: 17
Referee: Yang Yizhou (China)

=== Fifth place play-off ===
7 September 2023
15:00

Mongolia	2–3	Hong Kong
Nandin-Erdene 70'; Bolorbold 89'	Report	Chan 44'; Chin 48'; Li Siu Hin 51'

Pitch 2 Qingdao Citizen Fitness Center, Qingdao
Attendance: 60
Referee: Yang Can (China)

== Knockout stage ==
In the knockout stage, the penalty shoot-out was used to decide the winner if necessary.

=== Bracket ===
Semi-finals
7 September – Qingdao (Pitch 9)
China	5
Chinese Taipei	0
7 September – Qingdao (Pitch 2)
Japan	4
South Korea	0

Final
8 September – Qingdao (Youth)
China (p)	0 (4)
Japan	0 (2)
Third Place
8 September – Qingdao (Youth)
Chinese Taipei	0
South Korea	4

=== Semi-finals ===
7 September 2023
10:00

China	5–0	Chinese Taipei
Wang Yi 2'; Yang Shuo 39', 86'; Bunyamin 62' (pen.); Du Junhao 79'	Report

Pitch 9 Qingdao Baisha Bay Football Centre, Qingdao
Attendance: 115
Referee: Nurzatbek Abdykadyrov (Kyrgyzstan)
7 September 2023
10:00

Japan	4–0	South Korea
Watanabe 27'; Hara 33'; Taka 65'; Urakawa 78'	Report

Pitch 2 Qingdao Citizen Fitness Center, Qingdao
Attendance: 17
Referee: Maher Al-Ali (Lebanon)

=== Third place match ===
8 September 2023
10:00

Chinese Taipei	0–4	South Korea
	Report	Lee Dong-geun 55'; Sung Chi-chan 73' (o.g.); Kim Ye-geon 86'; Jang Yo-han 90+1'

Qingdao Youth Stadium, Qingdao
Attendance: 56
Referee: Yang Ping (China)

=== Final ===
8 September 2023
19:00

China	0–0	Japan
	Report
Penalties
Li Xiang (penalty missed); Yao Junyu (penalty scored); Yang Shuo (penalty scored); Zhang Hongfu (penalty scored); Liu Jiale (penalty scored)	4–2	(penalty missed) Ogawa; (penalty scored) Sakaguchi; (penalty scored) Taka; (penalty missed) Urakawa

Qingdao Youth Stadium, Qingdao
Attendance: 500
Referee: Maher Al-Ali (Lebanon)

== Statistics ==
=== Winners ===
2023 EAFF U-15 Men's Championship winners

China
First title

=== Awards ===
Most Valuable Player	Top Scorer Award	Best Goalkeeper Award
(China) Liu Binglin	(Chinese Taipei) Jhang Tian-yun	(China) Zhang Congxi

=== Goalscorers ===
There were 204 goals scored in 22 matches, for an average of 9.27 goals per match.

11 goals

- (Chinese Taipei) Jhang Tian-yun

9 goals

- (Hong Kong) Yiu Tsz Leong

8 goals

- (Japan) Yuto Taka
- (South Korea) Jang Yo-han

7 goals

- (China) Hu Xiwen
- (China) Yang Qiandong
- (Hong Kong) Li Siu Hin
- (Japan) Kei Urakawa
- (South Korea) Kang Min-jun
- (South Korea) Kim Ye-geon

6 goals

- (Japan) Minato Hara
- (Japan) Ryojiro Nobushige

5 goals

- (Japan) Eita Sasaki

4 goals

- (China) Yang Shuo
- (China) Wang Yi

3 goals

- (China) Liu Jiale
- (China) Wang Weixuan
- (Macau) Ng Kuan Hou
- (Macau) Ung U Hin
- (Mongolia) Chiguun Bolorbold
- (South Korea) Kim Min-jun
- (South Korea) Lee Gang-hyeon
- (South Korea) Park Jung-ho

2 goals

- (China) Bunyamin Abdusalam
- (China) Du Junhao
- (China) Han Yiheng
- (China) Li Xiang
- (China) Yao Junyu
- (China) Wang Gengrui
- (China) Zhang Hongfu
- (Chinese Taipei) Kao Kuan-yu
- (Chinese Taipei) Lu Yi-hung
- (Chinese Taipei) Tai Zih-han
- (Hong Kong) Jeffrey Chin
- (Hong Kong) Fung Tin Wing
- (Hong Kong) Gao Ming Ho
- (Japan) Haru Nagano
- (Japan) Rei Otake
- (Japan) Haruto Yoshida
- (Mongolia) Naranbayar Nandin-Erdene
- (Mongolia) Khuslen Otgonkhuyag
- (Northern Mariana Islands) Paul Lizama

1 goal

- (China) Bian Yulang
- (China) Shang Tianyu
- (China) Shao Mingzhen
- (Chinese Taipei) Ating Wilang
- (Chinese Taipei) Ku Cheng-hao
- (Chinese Taipei) Sung Chi-chan
- (Guam) Jadyel Rink
- (Hong Kong) Jay-Marc Chan
- (Hong Kong) Choi Long Hei
- (Hong Kong) Sin Wai Kiu
- (Hong Kong) Tristan Jan Verkade
- (Japan) Riku Fushihara
- (Japan) Keita Kashu
- (Japan) Naoto Ogawa
- (Japan) Haruki Watanabe
- (Macau) Chao Chi Hou
- (Macau) Chong Chon Iat
- (Mongolia) Odbayr Baasandorj
- (Mongolia) Batmend Baasanjav
- (Mongolia) Nergui Khishigjargal
- (Mongolia) Tuvshinbayr Turbat
- (South Korea) Han Jun-hee
- (South Korea) Heo Hwan
- (South Korea) Kim Se-bin
- (South Korea) Kim Seung-hyun
- (South Korea) Lee Dong-geun
- (South Korea) Oh Taek-yung
- (South Korea) Shim Woo-sol

1 own goal

- (Chinese Taipei) Sung Chi-chan (against South Korea)
- (Mongolia) Khangal Battumur (against South Korea)
