= Chinese Youth Football Elite League (Division U-15) =

- Founded: 2024
- Region: China
- Teams: 23 (2025 season)
- Current champions: Evergrande Football School U15 (2025)
- Most championships: Evergrande Football School U15 (2 titles)

The Chinese Youth Football Elite League (Division U-15) (simplified Chinese: 中国足球青少年精英联赛（U15组）; traditional Chinese: 中國足球青少年精英聯賽（U15組）) is a Chinese professional youth football competition for under-15 players, organized by the Chinese Professional Football League (CFL). The tournament was established in 2024 under the name Chinese Football Association Youth Football Championship (Professional Clubs U-15 Division) and was renamed in April 2025.

== History ==
The competition was first held in 2024 as the Chinese Football Association Youth Football Championship (Professional Clubs U-15 Division). On 30 April 2025, the Chinese Football Professional League announced that all professional club youth competitions would be unified under the name Chinese Youth Football Elite League, with the U-15 division becoming the Chinese Youth Football Elite League (Division U-15).

== Format ==
The tournament is open to professional club U-15 teams. According to the 2025 season regulations, clubs competing in the Chinese Super League and China League One are required to participate, while China League Two clubs are encouraged to enter. The 2025 season featured 23 participating teams.

The competition format consists of a preliminary stage and a final stage. In the preliminary stage, teams are divided into southern and northern zones for a single round-robin format. The top teams from each zone advance to the final stage, which is divided into a championship group and a classification group, both playing single round-robin matches.

Players eligible for the U-15 division are those born between 1 January 2010 and 31 December 2011. (for 2025 season) Foreign and Hong Kong, Macao, and Taiwan players are not permitted to register.

== Results ==
=== 2024 season ===
The 2024 season was conducted in three stages. The knockout stage was held from 7 to 17 May in Wuhan and Weifang, with 19 teams divided into four groups. The final first stage took place from 10 to 24 September in Nanjing and Yancheng, featuring 16 teams. The final second stage was held in Zhuhai in November.

On 16 November 2024, Guangzhou Club U-15 defeated Shanghai Shenhua U-15 2–1 in the final to win the championship. Cheng Chenghan and Wang Feiniya scored for Guangzhou, while Zou Yuhan scored for Shanghai Shenhua.

Wang Feiniya of Guangzhou Club was named the tournament's best player after scoring 11 goals. Qin Ziniu of Guangzhou Club was named best goalkeeper. Shuai Weihao of Chengdu Rongcheng was the top scorer with 16 goals.

=== 2025 season ===
The 2025 season preliminary stage was held from 7 to 22 May. The final stage took place from 25 October to 8 November in Beihai and Haikou. The championship group was held in Hainan at the China Football (South) Training Base.

On 5 November 2025, Evergrande Football School U-15 defeated Shanghai Shenhua U-15 3–1 to clinch the title with one round remaining. Yu Jiawei scored the equaliser for Evergrande Football School before the team added two more goals in the second half. Evergrande Football School won all seven matches in the final stage, scoring 14 goals and conceding 3. Shanghai Shenhua U-15 finished as runners-up, Meizhou Hakka U-15 placed third, and Zhejiang Professional FC U-15 finished fourth.

== Champions ==
Season	Champions	Runners-up	Third place	Fourth place	Top scorer
2024 (as CFA Youth Football Championship)	Guangzhou Club U15	Shanghai Shenhua U15	Shandong Taishan U15	Wuhan Three Towns U15	Shuai Weihao (Chengdu Rongcheng U15) 16 goals
2025	Evergrande Football School U15	Shanghai Shenhua U15	Meizhou Hakka U15	Zhejiang Professional FC U15	Chen Jiale (Zhejiang Professional FC U15) 7 goals
2026	TBD				

== See also ==
- Chinese Youth Football Elite League (Division U-17)
- Chinese Youth Football Elite League (Division U-21)
- China Youth Football League
