= Chinese Youth Football Elite League (Division U-17) =

Youth football league in China

Chinese Youth Football Elite League (U17)
- Current season, competition or edition: 2025 season
- Classification: Youth development league
- Sport: Association football
- Founded: 2022 (predecessor tournaments)
- Founder: Chinese Football Association
- No. of teams: 31 (2025 season)
- Country: China
- Confederation: AFC
- Most recent champion: Evergrande Football School U17 (2025)
- Level on pyramid: U17 Echelon

The Chinese Youth Football Elite League (U17 Division) (Chinese: 中国足球青少年精英联赛（U17组）), abbreviated as U17 League, is a professional youth football competition in China organized by the Chinese Professional Football League (CFL) for under-17 players. Established in 2025 through the merger and rebranding of previous tournaments, it represents the highest tier of professional club youth football for the U17 age category in China.

== History ==
=== Origins and rebranding ===
The tournament was officially renamed the Chinese Youth Football Elite League (U17 Division) on 30 April 2025, consolidating the former CFA Youth Football Championship (Professional Club U17 Division) and the China Professional Club U17 League. This restructuring was part of broader reforms following the separation of management and operation between professional leagues and the Football Association in 2025.

The predecessor tournaments date back to 2022, with the Evergrande Football School U17 team winning the championship in 2022 and 2023 under different competition formats.

=== 2025 inaugural season ===
The 2025 season marked the first edition under the new name and format, featuring 31 participating clubs—the highest number in the competition's history. The tournament was conducted in multiple phases: preliminary rounds, and final stage divided into two phases.

The preliminary phase was held across four venues: Yancheng Yufeng Football Training Base, Shandong Luneng Taishan Football School, Yuxi Plateau Football Training Base, and Rizhao International Football Center. The first phase of finals took place from 18 July to 1 August 2025 in Weifang and Tangshan, comprising 7 rounds and 56 matches. The second phase of finals was held from 17 to 31 December 2025 at the Zhuhai Suoka Football Training Base.

== 2025 season ==
=== Participants ===
The 2025 season featured 31 clubs from China's professional league system, including teams from the Chinese Super League, China League One, and China League Two. Notable participants included Shandong Taishan U17, Guangzhou Evergrande Football School U17, Shanghai Shenhua U17, Shanghai Port U17, Changchun Yatai U17, and Beijing Guoan U17.

=== Final standings ===
Evergrande Football School U17 won the championship with a perfect record of six consecutive victories in the final phase, defeating Shandong Taishan U17 A team 2-1 in the decisive match on 29 December 2025 to secure the title one round early. Changchun Yatai U17 finished as runners-up, while Shanghai Shenhua U17 secured third place.

Top goal scorers included Huo Lutong (Changchun Yatai), Ma Xingbo (Liaoning Iron Man U17 B), and Tang Tianyu (Guangzhou U17), each scoring 5 goals.

== Player development ==
The U17 League serves as a critical developmental platform for players transitioning to professional football. Majority called up to the China U-17 national team training camps in 2025 came from clubs participating in this competition.

The league also provides pathways to professional contracts. Following Guangzhou FC's dissolution, Evergrande Football School announced plans to form a professional team based on their U-17 championship squad, potentially entering the Chinese Champions League.

== Future plans ==
The Chinese Football League plans to expand the Elite League system to include U19, U14, and U13 divisions, building a comprehensive youth elite competition structure. The CFL has also established bonus systems to reward clubs that develop players for the national team and professional leagues.

== Champions ==
| Season | Champions | Runners-up | Third place | Notes |
|---|---|---|---|---|
| 2022 | Zhejiang Professional FC U17 A | — | — | Former tournament format |
| 2023 | Zhejiang Professional FC U17 Green | — | — | Former tournament format |
| 2024 | Shanghai Port U17 | Langfang Glory City U17 | Guangzhou FC U17 | As CFA Youth Championship |
| 2025 | Evergrande Football School U17 | Changchun Yatai U17 | Shanghai Shenhua U17 | First season as Elite League |
| 2026 | TBD | | | |

== See also ==
- China Youth Football League
- Chinese Youth Football Elite League (Division U-21)
- Chinese Youth Football Elite League (Division U-15)
- Chinese Football Association
- Chinese Football League
- China national under-17 football team
