= 2025 China Youth Football League =

- Dates: April – November 2025

The 2025 China Youth Football League (CYFL) (Chinese: 中国青少年足球联赛) is the fourth edition of the premier youth football competition in China. Organized by the Chinese Football Association (CFA), the Ministry of Education, and the State General Administration of Sport, it represents China's most comprehensive youth football tournament featuring participants from schools, professional club academies, sports schools, and social institutions.

== History ==
The China Youth Football League was established in 2022 to integrate China's youth football development system and break down barriers between educational and sports systems.

== Qualification ==
The 2025 China Youth Football League (CYFL) introduced a structural change by adding a regional qualification stage for the U13 and U15 men's groups. This new stage was inserted between the local qualifiers and the national finals. The country was divided into six geographic zones for these regional competitions. For the U13 group, 351 teams initially competed in local qualifiers. From these, 84 teams advanced to the regional stage, and finally, 32 teams progressed to the national finals. A similar structure was used for the U15 group, where 446 teams began in the local qualifiers, 81 advanced to the regional competitions, and 32 ultimately qualified for the national finals. This new format is seen as a step towards implementing a more regular home-and-away match system in the future, particularly for the latter stages of the competition like the semi-finals and finals.

== Competition Format ==
The 2025 Men's U15 tournament followes structure involving 18 groups (A through R) with regional qualifiers and national finals.

The 2025 Men's U13 tournament followes structure involving 22 groups (A through V) with regional qualifiers and national finals.

The 2025 Men's U17 tournament followed a two-stage structure involving regional competitions and national finals. The top 12 teams from the 2024 season automatically qualified for the national finals. The competition featured 46 teams in the first stage of finals, divided into 8 groups, with the top three teams from each group advancing to the second stage of finals

== U13 Group Stage Results ==
The following tables represent the complete group stage standings for the 2025 Men's U13 tournament:

=== Group A ===
Group A Standings
Position	Team	P	W	D	L	GF	GA	GD	Pts
1	Dalian Yingbo U13	2	2	0	0	8	1	+7	6
2	Changchun Yatai U13	2	1	0	1	4	3	+1	3
3	Yanji Sports School U13	2	0	0	2	0	8	-8	0

=== Group B ===
Group B Standings
Position	Team	P	W	D	L	GF	GA	GD	Pts
1	Dalian University of Technology Affiliated School Tornado Team U13	2	2	0	0	17	0	+17	6
2	Shenyang Hepingler U13	2	1	0	1	1	6	-5	3
3	Dalian No.21 Middle School Lujin U13	2	0	0	2	1	13	-12	0

=== Group C ===
Group C Standings
Position	Team	P	W	D	L	GF	GA	GD	Pts
1	Beijing No.3 High School U13	3	3	0	0	11	3	+8	9
2	Tianjin Binhai U13	3	2	0	1	6	6	0	6
3	Luneng Football School U13	3	1	0	2	11	6	+5	3
4	Zhengzhou Lishui U13	3	0	0	3	1	14	-13	0

=== Group D ===
Group D Standings
Position	Team	P	W	D	L	GF	GA	GD	Pts
1	Henan U13	3	2	0	1	7	3	+4	6
2	Tianjin Jinmen Tiger U13	3	2	0	1	5	6	-1	6
3	No. 48 Middle School Championship U13	3	1	0	2	4	3	+1	3
4	Beijing Guoan U13	3	1	0	2	4	8	-4	3

=== Group E ===
Group E Standings
Position	Team	P	W	D	L	GF	GA	GD	Pts
1	Shandong Taishan U13	3	3	0	0	22	1	+21	9
2	Beijing Bayi Aoxiang U13	3	2	0	1	12	4	+8	6
3	Pingdingshan Prince U13	3	1	0	2	4	7	-3	3
4	Tianjin Ruilong U13	3	0	0	3	0	26	-26	0

=== Group F ===
Group F Standings
Position	Team	P	W	D	L	GF	GA	GD	Pts
1	Hebi Heteng U13	3	3	0	0	11	4	+7	9
2	Qingdao Hainiu Hainuo U13	3	2	0	1	10	4	+6	6
3	Tsinghua University High School U13	3	1	0	2	4	4	0	3
4	Taiyuan Dongliang U13	3	0	0	3	1	14	-13	0

=== Group G ===
Group G Standings
Position	Team	P	W	D	L	GF	GA	GD	Pts
1	Xi'an Hi-Tech Zone U13	2	2	0	0	8	2	+6	6
2	Shizuishan Experimental Star U13	2	1	0	1	4	2	+2	3
3	Xilin Gol Mongolian Horse U13	2	0	0	2	1	9	-8	0

=== Group H ===
Group H Standings
Position	Team	P	W	D	L	GF	GA	GD	Pts
1	Ordos Manson U13	3	3	0	0	17	6	+11	9
2	Pingluo Middle School Hengli U13	3	2	0	1	8	6	+2	6
3	Xinjiang Dream Leaders U13	3	1	0	2	15	6	+9	3
4	Xi'an Longqi U13	3	0	0	3	3	25	-22	0

=== Group I ===
Group I Standings
Position	Team	P	W	D	L	GF	GA	GD	Pts
1	Shaanxi Normal University Affiliated High School U13	3	3	0	0	23	1	+22	9
2	Yulin Future U13	3	2	0	1	7	7	0	6
3	Yinchuan No.15 Middle School Helan Mountain U13	3	1	0	2	6	13	-7	3
4	Qinghai Kress U13	3	0	0	3	2	17	-15	0

=== Group J ===
Group J Standings
Position	Team	P	W	D	L	GF	GA	GD	Pts
1	Xi'an Qituo U13	2	2	0	0	9	2	+7	6
2	Xi'an Railway No.1 Middle School U13	2	1	0	1	13	4	+9	3
3	Corps Third Division U13	2	0	0	2	0	16	-16	0

=== Group K ===
Group K Standings
Position	Team	P	W	D	L	GF	GA	GD	Pts
1	Changsha Lushan International U13	3	3	0	0	18	0	+18	9
2	Nanjing Yu Junior High School U13	3	2	0	1	5	5	0	6
3	Changning Sports School U13	3	1	0	2	1	9	-8	3
4	Huaibei Sports School U13	3	0	0	3	0	10	-10	0

=== Group L ===
Group L Standings
Position	Team	P	W	D	L	GF	GA	GD	Pts
1	Hunan Football Youth Training Center U13	3	3	0	0	4	2	+2	9
2	Zhejiang U13	3	2	0	1	3	2	+1	6
3	Wuhan Men's U13	3	1	0	2	3	4	-1	3
4	Suzhou Dongwu Xinshi U13	3	0	0	3	4	6	-2	0

=== Group M ===
Group M Standings
Position	Team	P	W	D	L	GF	GA	GD	Pts
1	Shanghai Shenhua U13	3	3	0	0	15	2	+13	9
2	Changsha No.1 Middle School Xinhuadu U13	3	2	0	1	6	5	+1	6
3	Hubei Youth Star U13	3	1	0	2	1	6	-5	3
4	Tongling Liaobang U13	3	0	0	3	2	11	-9	0

=== Group N ===
Group N Standings
Position	Team	P	W	D	L	GF	GA	GD	Pts
1	Hefei Sports School U13	3	3	0	0	9	3	+6	9
2	Zhongya Peicui U13	3	2	0	1	5	3	+2	6
3	Lucky Star Cannes U13	3	1	0	2	7	7	0	3
4	Elite Youth Training Normal University Affiliated High School U13	3	0	0	3	2	10	-8	0

=== Group O ===
Group O Standings
Position	Team	P	W	D	L	GF	GA	GD	Pts
1	Chongqing Nanyu U13	3	3	0	0	11	3	+8	9
2	The Affiliated High School of Southwest University U13	3	2	0	1	7	4	+3	6
3	Zunyi Mengya U13	3	1	0	2	3	9	-6	3
4	Huaxie Club U13	3	0	0	3	1	6	-5	0

=== Group P ===
Group P Standings
Position	Team	P	W	D	L	GF	GA	GD	Pts
1	Zhongbei Middle School Xinxiongqi U13	3	3	0	0	13	2	+11	9
2	Chongqing No.1 Middle School Bilingual U13	3	2	0	1	13	6	+7	6
3	Chengdu Tangwai U13	3	1	0	2	5	9	-4	3
4	Yukun Yuxi U13	3	0	0	3	3	17	-14	0

=== Group Q ===
Group Q Standings
Position	Team	P	W	D	L	GF	GA	GD	Pts
1	Chongqing No.8 Middle School Hongfan U13	3	2	0	1	13	5	+8	6
2	Guiyang No.1 Middle School Li Duanfen U13	3	2	0	1	7	5	+2	6
3	Mianzhong Yingcai U13	3	1	0	2	7	15	-8	3
4	Kunming-Sint-Evans U13	3	1	0	2	4	6	-2	3

=== Group R ===
Group R Standings
Position	Team	P	W	D	L	GF	GA	GD	Pts
1	Chongqing No. 7 Middle School Dongchuan U13	2	2	0	0	10	2	+8	6
2	Guizhou Star Project U13	2	1	0	1	2	5	-3	3
3	No.7 Middle School Wanda U13	2	0	0	2	2	7	-5	0

=== Group S ===
Group S Standings
Position	Team	P	W	D	L	GF	GA	GD	Pts
1	Dingnan Dream U13	3	3	0	0	13	4	+9	9
2	South China Normal University High School U13	3	2	0	1	13	6	+7	6
3	Shenzhen Nanwai Wenhua U13	3	1	0	2	14	8	+6	3
4	Xiamen Dong Fangzhuo U13	3	0	0	3	5	27	-22	0

=== Group T ===
Group T Standings
Position	Team	P	W	D	L	GF	GA	GD	Pts
1	Shenzhen Peng City Cuiyuan U13	3	3	0	0	12	2	+10	9
2	Evergrande Football School U13	3	2	0	1	13	2	+11	6
3	NTU Star Dream U13	3	1	0	2	4	15	-11	3
4	Fuzhou U13	3	0	0	3	4	14	-10	0

=== Group U ===
Group U Standings
Position	Team	P	W	D	L	GF	GA	GD	Pts
1	Guangdong Mingtu U13	3	3	0	0	11	3	+8	9
2	Cuiyuan Experimental U13	3	2	0	1	17	2	+15	6
3	Hainan Zhonghai U13	3	1	0	2	4	13	-9	3
4	Xiamen Jimei Middle School U13	3	0	0	3	4	18	-14	0

=== Group V ===
Group V Standings
Position	Team	P	W	D	L	GF	GA	GD	Pts
1	2028 Li Songli U13	3	3	0	0	17	2	+15	9
2	Guangzhou Yinghua Sili U13	3	2	0	1	11	8	+3	6
3	Nan'an Zhonghui Xingbang U13	3	1	0	2	5	10	-5	3
4	Nanchang No.2 Middle School Hongcheng U13	3	0	0	3	2	15	-13	0

== U15 Group Stage Results ==
The following tables represent the complete group stage standings for the 2025 tournament:

=== Group A ===
Group A Standings
Position	Team	P	W	D	L	GF	GA	GD	Pts
1	Liaoning Haihua Football Club U15	4	4	0	0	12	0	+12	12
2	Changchun YaTai U15	4	3	0	1	14	3	+11	9
3	Dalian No.39 Middle School U15	4	2	0	2	8	6	+2	6
4	Shenyang Xinye Football Club U15	4	1	0	3	5	7	-2	3
5	Heilongjiang U15	4	0	0	4	2	25	-23	0

=== Group B ===
Group B Standings
Position	Team	P	W	D	L	GF	GA	GD	Pts
1	Dalian University of Technology Affiliated School Tornado Team U15	4	3	0	1	15	5	+10	9
2	Dalian Yingbo U15	4	3	0	1	29	5	+24	9
3	Dalian Yingbo U14	4	3	0	1	10	11	-1	9
4	Yanji Sports School U15	4	1	0	3	10	16	-6	3
5	Shenyang Olympic Sports Center U15	4	0	0	4	3	30	-27	0

=== Group C ===
Group C Standings
Position	Team	P	W	D	L	GF	GA	GD	Pts
1	Luneng Football School U14	3	3	0	0	6	3	+3	9
2	Tsinghua University High School U15	3	2	0	1	6	2	+4	6
3	Henan FC U15	3	1	0	2	4	5	-1	3
4	Qingdao Hainiu U15	3	0	0	3	2	8	-6	0

=== Group D ===
Group D Standings
Position	Team	P	W	D	L	GF	GA	GD	Pts
1	Shijiazhuang NO.Forty Middle School Wanbo U15	3	2	0	1	3	8	-5	6
2	Datong Sports School U15	3	2	0	1	5	4	+1	6
3	Haidian Sports School No. 3 High School U15	3	1	0	2	3	3	0	3
4	Zhengzhou Hansen U15	3	1	0	2	8	4	+4	3

=== Group E ===
Group E Standings
Position	Team	P	W	D	L	GF	GA	GD	Pts
1	ShanDong TaiShan FC U15	2	2	0	0	10	1	+9	6
2	Beijing No.3 High School U15	2	1	0	1	8	3	+5	3
3	Tianjin King U15	2	0	0	2	0	14	-14	0

=== Group F ===
Group F Standings
Position	Team	P	W	D	L	GF	GA	GD	Pts
1	Beijing Bayi Aoxiang U15	3	3	0	0	9	2	+7	9
2	Beijing Guoan U15	3	2	0	1	6	1	+5	6
3	Zhengzhou NO.2 Junior High School U15	3	1	0	2	3	6	-3	3
4	Tianjin Pengcheng U15	3	0	0	3	1	10	-9	0

=== Group G ===
Group G Standings
Position	Team	P	W	D	L	GF	GA	GD	Pts
1	Xi'an Shi Tieyi Zhongxue U15	5	4	0	1	25	13	+12	12
2	Shizuishan Hengxing Football Club U15	5	4	0	1	36	6	+30	12
3	Ordos Sports Vocational Middle School U15	5	3	0	2	20	9	+11	9
4	Yulin Future U15	5	2	0	3	7	19	-12	6
5	The High School Affiliated to Shaanxi Normal University U15	5	2	0	3	7	7	0	6
6	Baiyin Jingyuan Sports School U15	5	0	0	5	5	46	-41	0

=== Group H ===
Group H Standings
Position	Team	P	W	D	L	GF	GA	GD	Pts
1	The High School Affiliated to Shaanxi Normal University Football Club U15	5	5	0	0	21	1	+20	15
2	Xi'an Gaoxin NO.2 Middle School Qituo U15	5	4	0	1	14	1	+13	12
3	Lingwu City No. 2 Middle School U15	5	3	0	2	16	6	+10	9
4	Liuba County Teenagers U15	5	2	0	3	6	9	-3	6
5	Xinjiang Production and Construction Corps Eighth Division U15	5	1	0	4	6	23	-17	3
6	Qinghai Keruisi U15	5	0	0	5	2	25	-23	0

=== Group I ===
Group I Standings
Position	Team	P	W	D	L	GF	GA	GD	Pts
1	Wuhan Three Towns U15	3	2	0	1	6	1	+5	6
2	NO.1 High School of Jiangyin Jiangsu U15	3	2	0	1	3	1	+2	6
3	Shanghai Port U15	3	1	0	2	3	7	-4	3
4	Hubei Istar U15	3	1	0	2	4	7	-3	3

=== Group J ===
Group J Standings
Position	Team	P	W	D	L	GF	GA	GD	Pts
1	Shanghai Jiading Huilong U15	3	3	0	0	14	2	+12	9
2	Bozhou Sports School 11th Middle School U15	3	1	0	2	7	11	-4	3
3	Ningbo Sports School U15	3	1	0	2	3	5	-2	3
4	ChangJun Riverside Middle School U15	3	1	0	2	3	9	-6	3

=== Group K ===
Group K Standings
Position	Team	P	W	D	L	GF	GA	GD	Pts
1	Shanghai Shenhua U15	3	3	0	0	11	0	+11	9
2	Zhejiang Professional FC U15	3	2	0	1	6	6	0	6
3	Nanjing Li Star U15	3	1	0	2	4	6	-2	3
4	Bengbu Bengti U15	3	0	0	3	1	10	-9	0

=== Group L ===
Group L Standings
Position	Team	P	W	D	L	GF	GA	GD	Pts
1	Jinhua Wucheng Sports School U15	3	3	0	0	5	3	+2	9
2	Hefei Sports School U15	3	2	0	1	9	5	+4	6
3	Yali Middle School U15	3	1	0	2	6	7	-1	3
4	Shanghai Xingyunxing U15	3	0	0	3	2	7	-5	0

=== Group M ===
Group M Standings
Position	Team	P	W	D	L	GF	GA	GD	Pts
1	Chongqing Fengmingshan High School U15	5	5	0	0	26	6	+20	15
2	Chongqing Nankai U15	5	4	0	1	29	5	+24	12
3	Kunming Fu Zhi Bo U15	5	2	0	3	9	11	-2	6
4	Deyang Olympic Sports School U15	5	2	0	3	7	10	-3	6
5	Mianyang Nanshan Bilingual School U15	5	2	0	3	9	22	-13	6
6	Yunnan Yukun U15	5	0	0	5	2	28	-26	0

=== Group N ===
Group N Standings
Position	Team	P	W	D	L	GF	GA	GD	Pts
1	Chongqing Yangjiaping Middle School U15	5	5	0	0	18	3	+15	15
2	Chengdu Tanghu Foreign languages School U15	5	4	0	1	14	7	+7	12
3	The Middle School attached to the GuiZhou Normal University U15	5	3	0	2	13	8	+5	9
4	Chongqing No. 7 High School U15	5	2	0	3	14	5	+9	6
5	Qujing Ethnic Middle School U15	5	1	0	4	7	22	-15	3
6	Affiliated Middle School of Sichuan University Chengdu No.12 High School U15	5	0	0	5	1	22	-21	0

=== Group O ===
Group O Standings
Position	Team	P	W	D	L	GF	GA	GD	Pts
1	Shenzhen Juniors U15	3	3	0	0	16	4	+12	9
2	Evergrande Football School U15	3	2	0	1	18	2	+16	6
3	Nanning Sports School U15	3	1	0	2	5	26	-21	3
4	Shenzhen Experimental School U15	3	0	0	3	3	10	-7	0

=== Group P ===
Group P Standings
Position	Team	P	W	D	L	GF	GA	GD	Pts
1	Meizhou Hakka U15	3	3	0	0	13	0	+13	9
2	Yichun No.9 Middle School U15	3	2	0	1	4	1	+3	6
3	Shenzhen Cuiyuan Experimental School U15	3	1	0	2	5	5	0	3
4	Fuzhou Golden Harbor Experimental School U15	3	0	0	3	0	16	-16	0

=== Group Q ===
Group Q Standings
Position	Team	P	W	D	L	GF	GA	GD	Pts
1	Guangdong Mingtu A U15	3	3	0	0	11	3	+8	9
2	Shenzhen Longhua Sports School U15	3	2	0	1	12	5	+7	6
3	Guangzhou Leopard Fifth Middle School U15	3	1	0	2	3	11	-8	3
4	Hainan Zhonghai U15	3	0	0	3	3	10	-7	0

=== Group R ===
Group R Standings
Position	Team	P	W	D	L	GF	GA	GD	Pts
1	Guangzhou Yinghuasili U15	3	3	0	0	11	3	+8	9
2	Guangdong Mingtu B U15	3	2	0	1	7	10	-3	6
3	Nanchang No.2 Middle School U15	3	1	0	2	9	6	+3	3
4	Shenzhen 2028 Education U15	3	0	0	3	6	14	-8	0

== U17 Group Stage Results ==
The following tables represent the complete group stage standings for the 2025 Men's U17 tournament:

=== Group A ===
Group A Standings
Position	Team	P	W	D	L	GF	GA	GD	Pts
1	Dalian Yingbo U17	4	4	0	0	17	5	+12	12
2	Shandong Taishan U17	4	3	0	1	28	2	+26	9
3	Changsha Changjun Binjiang Middle School U17	4	1	0	3	8	15	-7	3
4	Shanghai Jiading Huilong U17	4	1	0	3	6	13	-7	3
5	Ningxia Sports Vocational College U17	4	1	0	3	2	26	-24	3

=== Group B ===
Group B Standings
Position	Team	P	W	D	L	GF	GA	GD	Pts
1	Changchun Yatai U17	4	3	0	1	10	0	+10	9
2	Evergrande Football School U17	4	3	0	1	9	0	+9	9
3	Meizhou Hakka U17	4	2	0	2	4	4	0	6
4	Zhengzhou No. 9 Middle School B U17	4	2	0	2	4	3	+1	6
5	Ningxia Pingluo Hengli U17	4	0	0	4	0	20	-20	0

=== Group C ===
Group C Standings
Position	Team	P	W	D	L	GF	GA	GD	Pts
1	Chongqing Nankai U17	5	4	0	1	9	2	+7	12
2	Shanghai Port FC U17	5	4	0	1	16	5	+11	12
3	Chongqing No. 1 Middle School U17	5	3	0	2	4	6	-2	9
4	The Affiliated Middle School of Shandong Normal University U17	5	2	0	3	5	12	-7	6
5	The Affiliated High School of Renmin University of China U17	5	1	0	4	4	9	-5	3
6	Shanghai Lucky Star FC U17	5	1	0	4	2	6	-4	3

=== Group D ===
Group D Standings
Position	Team	P	W	D	L	GF	GA	GD	Pts
1	Henan Experimental Middle School U17	5	4	0	1	11	3	+8	12
2	Ji'nan Licheng No. 2 Middle School U17	5	4	0	1	9	3	+6	12
3	Hefei Luyang Senior High School U17	5	3	0	2	8	8	0	9
4	Hefei No.1 Middle School U17	5	3	0	2	10	9	+1	9
5	Sichuan Yuhui Rende U17	5	1	0	4	8	11	-3	3
6	Yinchuan No. 2 Middle School U17	5	0	0	5	2	14	-12	0

=== Group E ===
Group E Standings
Position	Team	P	W	D	L	GF	GA	GD	Pts
1	Liaoning Tieren U17	5	5	0	0	10	3	+7	15
2	Zhengzhou No. 9 Middle School U17	5	4	0	1	14	6	+8	12
3	Changsha Yali Middle School U17	5	3	0	2	15	7	+8	9
4	Luoyang No. 1 Senior High School U17	5	2	0	3	5	9	-4	6
5	Daguang Sports University Affiliated Middle School U17	5	1	0	4	7	14	-7	3
6	Beijing Guoan U17	5	0	0	5	3	15	-12	0

=== Group F ===
Group F Standings
Position	Team	P	W	D	L	GF	GA	GD	Pts
1	Jiangsu Province Jiangning Football Training Base 1st Team U17	5	4	0	1	8	3	+5	12
2	Shenzhen Pengcheng Shenzhen Second Experimental School U17	5	3	0	2	10	9	+1	9
3	Zhejiang Professional FC U17	5	3	0	2	16	13	+3	9
4	Guangzhou Bao Peizheng Middle School U17	5	2	0	3	10	8	+2	6
5	Evergrande Football School U16	5	2	0	3	8	10	-2	6
6	Nantong Haimen Codion U17	5	1	0	4	6	15	-9	3

=== Group G ===
Group G Standings
Position	Team	P	W	D	L	GF	GA	GD	Pts
1	Tsinghua University High School U17	5	4	0	1	13	5	+8	12
2	Tianjin Sports School U17	5	4	0	1	7	3	+4	12
3	Shenyang Big Ball Center U17	5	3	0	2	12	6	+6	9
4	Shijiazhuang No.2 Middle School Experimental School Team A U17	5	3	0	2	5	7	-2	9
5	Mianyang Nanshan Middle School Bilingual School U17	5	1	0	4	6	7	-1	3
6	Zhengzhou Jingmiao U17	5	0	0	5	0	15	-15	0

=== Group H ===
Group H Standings
Position	Team	P	W	D	L	GF	GA	GD	Pts
1	Dalian Football Association U17	5	4	0	1	14	6	+8	12
2	Changsha Lushan International Experimental School U17	5	4	0	1	10	6	+4	12
3	Shanghai Shenhua U17	5	3	0	2	13	9	+4	9
4	Chongqing Fengmingshan Middle School U17	5	3	0	2	11	7	+4	9
5	Qingdao Hainiu U17	5	1	0	4	5	9	-4	3
6	Dalian No. 13 Middle School U17	5	0	0	5	1	17	-16	0

== 2025 Season ==
=== Events ===
The 2025 season's national finals feature several notable competitions. The women's U16 high school age group completed its second stage in August 2025, with eighteen teams advancing to the third stage after 51 matches. Teams including Jiangsu Lottery U16 Women's Football Team and Sichuan U16 Women's Football Team demonstrated strong performances in their respective groups.

In the U13 age group, intense semi-final matches saw Zhejiang U13 team defeat Changsha Lushan International with a 6-4 aggregate score after two legs (3-2 in each match). Another semi-final featured a closely contested match between Evergrande Football School U13 and Dalian Workers Affiliated School Tornado U13.

The National Five-a-Side Football Youth Championship concluded with Shenzhen Bibo United Football Club winning the U19 men's title after defeating Shunde Shunshang 3-2 in the final. The U13 women's five-a-side title was claimed by Guangzhou Nanwu Middle School, who came from behind to defeat Taizhou Jiaojiang No.5 Middle School Zhongxin Club 3-1.

=== Participation ===
The league maintains an open participation policy, allowing teams from schools, clubs, sports schools, and social institutions to compete without restrictions. This has resulted in participation from over 50,000 players across 30 provinces, including regions such as Tibet and Xinjiang.

== Related Initiatives ==
Parallel to the CYFL, the China Football Development Foundation launched the Social Football Youth Training Quality Improvement Action Plan in 2025. This public welfare project addresses challenges faced by social grass-roots youth training institutions, including low coach salaries, high turnover, and variable coaching standards. The initiative provides funding support for coach training, echelon construction, daily training, and competition participation.

== See also ==
- Football in China
- Chinese Football Association
