= Wang Gengrui =

Chinese footballer (born 2008)

Personal information
- Date of birth: 16 September 2008 (age 18)
- Place of birth: Yancheng, Jiangsu, China
- Height: 1.76 m (5 ft 9 in)
- Position: Left-back

Team information
- Current team: Qingdao West Coast
- Number: 22

Youth career
- 2017–2026: Evergrande Academy

Senior career*
Years	Team	Apps	(Gls)
2026–	Qingdao West Coast	25	(0)

International career^{‡}
2023–2025	China U17		
2026–	China U19	1	(0)
2026–	China	2	(0)
Medal record
Representing China
Men's football
EAFF U-15 Championship
Gold medal – first place	2023 China	Team
- * Club domestic league appearances and goals as of 19 November 2026 ‡ National team caps and goals as of 27 September 2026

Wang Gengrui (Chinese: 王庚睿; pinyin: Wáng Gēngruì; born 16 September 2008) is a Chinese professional footballer who plays as a left-back for Chinese Super League club Qingdao West Coast and the China national team.

== Early life and youth career ==
Wang was born on 16 September 2008. He joined Evergrande Academy in 2017.

== Club career ==
=== Evergrande Academy ===
Wang developed through the youth ranks at Evergrande Academy. In 2023, he was part of the Evergrande Academy U15 team that formed the core of the China U15 national team.

=== Qingdao West Coast ===
On 27 February 2026, Qingdao West Coast officially announced the signing of Wang from Evergrande Academy. The transfer fee was reported as 99,000 euros (approximately 800,000 RMB). He was assigned the squad number 22.

During the 2026 Chinese Super League season, Wang made 10 appearances with 9 starts, accumulating 875 minutes of playing time as of early June 2026. By late May 2026, he had made 7 starts and had become the team's main left-back.

== International career ==
In September 2023, Wang was called up to the China U15 national team for the East Asian Football Federation U15 Men's Football Championship, where he scored and helped China win the championship.

In 2024, Wang was called up to the China U16 national team on multiple occasions. In August 2024, he started for China U16 in the "Peace Cup" international invitational tournament.

In February 2025, Wang was called up to the China U17 national team for training camp ahead of the U-17 Asian Cup. In March 2025, he suffered an injury during training camp in Foshan that was initially feared to jeopardize his participation in the tournament, but medical examinations indicated he would recover within approximately one week.

In January 2026, Wang was called up to the China U19 national team for training camp. In May 2026, he was named in the China U19 squad along with Qingdao West Coast teammates Yang Zhanpeng and Jia Weiwei.

On 24 September 2026, Wang made his debut for the senior China national team in a friendly against the Maldives.

== Career statistics ==
=== Club ===
As of 7 June 2026

Appearances and goals by club, season and competition
Club	Season	League			National Cup		Continental		Other		Total	
Club	Season	Division	Apps	Goals	Apps	Goals	Apps	Goals	Apps	Goals	Apps	Goals
Qingdao West Coast	2026	Chinese Super League	11	0	0	0	—		—		11	0
Career total			11	0	0	0	0	0	0	0	11	0

== Honours ==
China U15

- EAFF U-15 Men's Championship: 2023
