= Liu Jiale =

Chinese footballer (born 2008)

Personal information
- Date of birth: 12 February 2008 (age 18)
- Place of birth: Zhengzhou, Henan, China
- Height: 1.81 m (5 ft 11 in)
- Position: Midfielder

Team information
- Current team: Chongqing Tonglianglong
- Number: 21

Youth career
- 2017–2026: Evergrande Football School

Senior career*
Years	Team	Apps	(Gls)
2026–	Chongqing Tonglianglong	8	(0)

International career^{‡}
2023	China U15		
2024–2025	China U17	1	(0)
2026–	China U19	5	(1)
Medal record
Representing China
Men's football
EAFF U-15 Championship
Gold medal – first place	2023 China	Team
- * Club domestic league appearances and goals as of 19 November 2026 ‡ National team caps and goals as of 12 July 2026

Liu Jiale (simplified Chinese: 刘佳乐; traditional Chinese: 劉佳樂; pinyin: Liú Jiālè; born 12 February 2008) is a Chinese professional footballer who plays as a midfielder for Chinese Super League club Chongqing Tonglianglong.

== Early life and youth career ==
Liu Jiale was born on 12 February 2008. He joined Evergrande Football School in 2017. In August 2022, he participated in the football men's group B competition at the 16th Guangdong Provincial Games.

== Club career ==
=== Evergrande Football School ===
Liu Jiale joined Evergrande Football School in 2017 and played for the school's U17 team.

=== Chongqing Tonglianglong ===
On 25 February 2026, Chongqing Tonglianglong officially announced the signing of Liu Jiale from Evergrande Football School. He was assigned the squad number 21. On 27 June 2026, he was named as a substitute in a Chinese Super League match against Tianjin Jinmen Tiger but did not make an appearance.

== International career ==
In August 2023, Liu Jiale was selected for the China U15 national team for the 2023 EAFF U-15 Men's Championship. On 4 September 2023, he scored a hat-trick in a 23–0 victory over the Northern Mariana Islands. On 8 September 2023, he scored in the penalty shootout as China defeated Japan 4–2 to win the tournament.

In October 2024, Liu Jiale was selected for the China U17 team for the 2025 AFC U-17 Asian Cup qualification. He started in the final group match against South Korea on 27 October 2024, playing in midfield alongside Yan Yuzhe and Yao Junyu as China drew 2–2 and qualified for the final tournament.

In February 2025, Liu Jiale was named in the China U17 squad for the second training camp of 2025 ahead of the 2025 AFC U-17 Asian Cup. In April 2025, he participated in the final tournament in Saudi Arabia, where China was eliminated in the group stage.

On 31 May 2026, Liu Jiale started for the China U19 national team in the opening match of the Toulon Tournament against Saudi Arabia, as China won 1–0. On 5 June 2026, he scored in the 36th second of a 1–0 victory over Colombia.

== Career statistics ==
=== Club ===
As of 12 July 2026

Appearances and goals by club, season and competition
Club	Season	League			National Cup		Continental		Other		Total	
Club	Season	Division	Apps	Goals	Apps	Goals	Apps	Goals	Apps	Goals	Apps	Goals
Chongqing Tonglianglong	2026	Chinese Super League	3	0	0	0	—		—		0	3
Career total			3	0	0	0	0	0	0	0	0	3

== Honours ==
China U15

- EAFF U-15 Men's Championship: 2023
