= Youth football in China =

China has three systems through which youth can participate in organised football: the school system, the National Youth Football Training Centre, and the professional system.

Historically, youth football in China began its modern rise in the early 1980s under Deng Xiaoping, but this excitement died down before the end of the decade. Youth football has recently seen another boom under Xi Jinping, especially with the 2015 Football Reform Plan.

== History ==
=== Ancient ===
The ancient game of cuju was played by both adults and children.

=== Start of modern rise (c. 1980 - 2012) ===
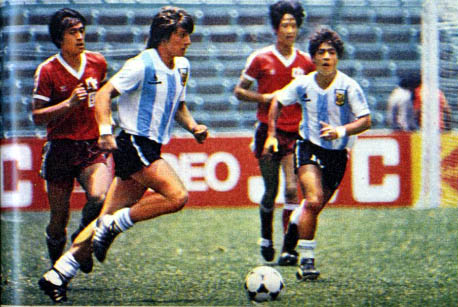
A game between Argentina and China at the 1983 FIFA World Youth Championship

Chinese youth football rose to political prominence under the leadership of Deng Xiaoping, who pursued an open door policy, which allowed for an increase in western influence within the country. Similarly, the introduction of the 5-day work week boosted football interest due to the ensuing activity gap. Officials saw the potential financial gains that were to be made from football as a major international sport, and basic reform began in the 1980s. Concerning youth football, Deng began to push the importance of early education in January 1979, as he took control of the physical education commission. The system was characterized by a traditional pyramid structure that featured specialized sports schools and professional teams but lacked sufficient grassroots initiatives.

Throughout the 1980s, youth football in China saw a huge boom – but this was generally surface-level and short-lived. Initial successes were seen internationally, but this was dampened following suspicion surrounding success in the 1985 FIFA World Youth Championship. The CFA did strict testing of the bone age of youth players and found an excessive number of cases of age fraud within youth football. For example, 120 football players in Wuzhou alone had bone ages exceeding their claimed biological age. Within this time frame, the 5.19 Incident had just taken place when 80,000 football fans rioted in Beijing over China's third loss in the World Cup qualification. Within the context of the one-child policy, poor social security, and subpar education within sports schools, parents became increasingly hesitant to push their children into youth football as a result of the high elimination rate of professional football. Similarly, the initially ambitious U15 Jianlibao youth talent team, founded in 1992, was funded by the CFA to go to Brazil for training but consequently received no training from Brazilian coaches or matches with other teams in their first two years, making the trip futile.

Despite a spike in interest in the 1980s, the number of youth football players in China fell from 650,000 in 1995 to a mere 13,524 in 2008.

=== Xi era (2012 - present) ===
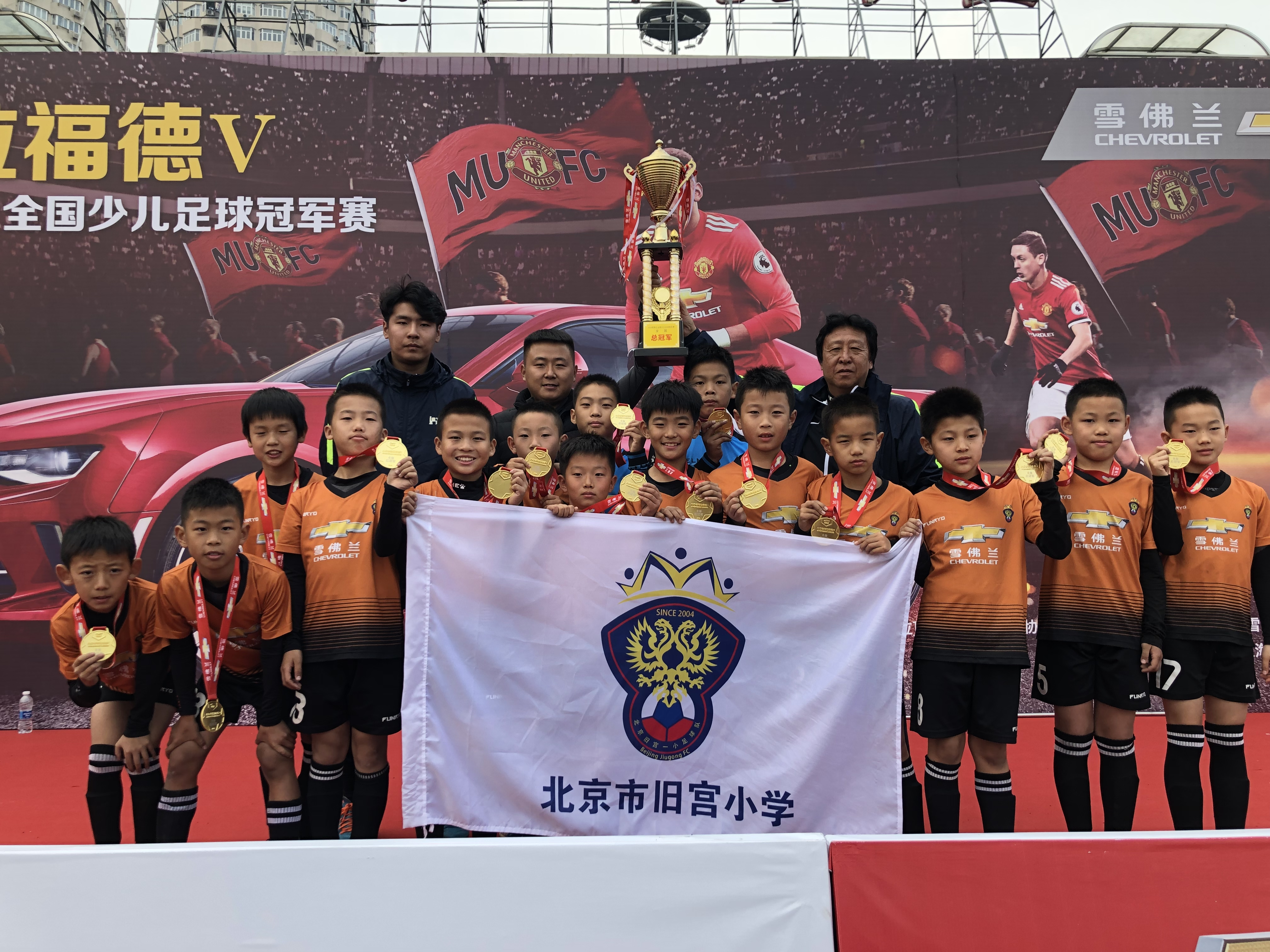
A team of primary school football players holding a trophy in 2018

Xi Jinping has been very vocal about the importance of growing youth football and has been a driver of football reform since he became General Secretary in 2012. Xi is known to be an avid football fan. On a visit to Germany in 2014 to observe a Chinese youth development team, Xi said that "I have confidence in you, in your generation. I hope you will become outstanding football players in the future". Visiting football stadiums and matches has been a common theme of Xi's foreign visits and he views it as an integral part of China's future.

In addition, there has been a selection of policy initiatives implemented by the Chinese government to curtail the influence of foreign players within the CSL. this initiative aims to promote the CSL as an avenue for local Chinese football talent rather than as a commercial project which it has recently been viewed as. Due to the previous system, there has been a lack of depth within professional squads, and this aims to provide a direct avenue for professional football from the youth system.

==== 2015 football reform plan ====
In 2015, the Chinese government introduced the Football Reform Plan. This initiative has three goals:

- By 2020, build 20,000 specialist football schools with 70,000 new football pitches producing between 30-50 million football-playing school children;
- By 2030, the 20,000 schools to become 50,000 schools, with China's men's team becoming one of the highest-ranked teams in Asia and the women's team be one of the highest-ranked in the world;
- By 2050, China will become a football superpower within FIFA's top 20 teams, hosted and won a World Cup.

As a part of the Reform Plan, the set-up of domestic football in China was also changed. The Chinese Football Association (CFA) was reformed and given autonomy by removing the control that the General Administration of Sport (GAS) used to have. In addition, the structure and management model of professional football in China was also reformed, focusing on rooting out corruption and gambling rings that had existed in the past.

A particular focus has been placed on youth football development as the primary way to develop football in China. To facilitate this, the government has enacted specific initiatives targeting the growth of the youth game. Local governments have been instructed to promote the popularization of football on campus. The Ministry of Education has made football compulsory in physical education. Additionally, there has been a focus on the early identification of talent and integration through all game levels.

== The three pathways ==
Youth football in China has 3 pathways that a young person can go through to become a professional player: the school-based system, the national youth football national training center, and through a professional football club system.

=== School-based system ===
The school-based system is whereby students of all ages develop their footballing skills while at school. The plan was to create 20,000 specialized football schools by 2020, with 30 to 50 million schoolkids playing the sport. By 2030 China wants 50,000 specialized football schools. The school-based system has incorporated football teaching into the curriculum plan, which is the first time a sport has been part of the school curriculum. This demonstrates how seriously China is taking youth football development by creating mass participation rather than just focusing on the elite levels. Doing so will help China achieve a healthy and sustainable development of the sport. Football competitions at this level are done at the provincial level amongst children of the same age, with the funding for both these competitions and the training of campus football being raised by the National Lottery and local government.

=== National Youth Football Training Centre ===
The CFA leads the second pathway through the National Youth Football Training Centre, with the support of local associations. By 2020 it had created 12 men's and 14 women's youth training centers. This pathway focuses on finding talent and developing it during training sessions. It differs from the other pathways as the CFA directly leads it, and it also has a focus on training coaches and referees. Training coaches is essential for the long-term development of youth football so that future players can receive even better training sessions.

=== Professional system ===
The professional system involves the most pressure on the players, as being selected for one of these academies is a great honour for them and their families. In 2019 roughly 5,000 youth football players stayed at professional football boarding schools. They are seen as the most significant aspect of developing youth and Chinese football. This is highlighted by the fact that professional clubs are required to develop an academy; for instance, Evergrande created theirs with Real Madrid.

In 2022 the China Youth Football League (CYFL) began for the first time. It was developed by China's Ministry of Education, the General Administration of Sport, and the CFA and is open to youth teams from every pathway, with teams playing in regional matches to qualify for a championship.

There has been an increase in the emphasis on social football within the nation. This has been done through school football cultural festivals. This is a diversion from the "Olympic strategy" which was previously being utilized in the sport, which has proved ineffective in cultivating talent reliably. It's being focused on to foster an organic level of football culture within China, rather than the sport being used solely as a vehicle for national pride. To facilitate this, in late 2025, physical education (PE) was officially mandated as a main subject in schools across China.

== Issues ==
The initiatives to boost youth football in China have had mixed results. Increased expenditure on youth football appears to have increased levels of youth participation. However, social barriers remain to recruit new elite young footballers. Football is often regarded as a hindrance to children's education, especially for children above 13. There is a problem of players having a busy training schedule that comes into conflict with their school obligations. For this reason, many parents prefer their children not to prioritize football. The conflict between education and football training appears to be one of the underlying causes of the shortage of elite football players above the age of 13.

While there has been increased expenditure on youth football, some have also highlighted a lack of skills and knowledge at a grassroots level. Some have stated that finding a coach with the right coaching skills was difficult. Some coaches were regarded as too focused on the short-term goal of achieving elite performance, and others could not communicate with and effectively motivate young players. Football's community-building benefits, as well as its benefits to mental and physical health, have largely been overlooked, failing to create an environment that draws in and motivates young players.

Despite aims to minimize corruption within football in China, there was recently an accusation of match-fixing within an under-15s fixture involving the Evergrande youth football team. This is a continuing issue within Chinese Football since the 1990s, and despite measures and arrests throughout the CFA in the 2010s, it is still pervasive throughout all levels of Chinese football, extending to the youth system.
