= Yao Junyu =

Chinese footballer

Personal information
- Date of birth: 9 January 2008 (age 18)
- Place of birth: Lijiang, Yunnan, China
- Height: 1.73 m (5 ft 8 in)
- Positions: Midfielder; attacking midfielder; winger

Team information
- Current team: Ningbo FC
- Number: 42

Youth career
- 2013–2016: Lijiang Ancient City Football School
- 2018–2026: Shandong Taishan Football School

Senior career*
Years	Team	Apps	(Gls)
2026–	Ningbo FC	8	(0)

International career^{‡}
2023	China U15	5	(2)
2024–2025	China U17		
2026–	China U19		
Medal record
Representing China
Men's football
EAFF U-15 Championship
Gold medal – first place	2023 China	Team
- * Club domestic league appearances and goals as of 23 September 2026 ‡ National team caps and goals as of 23 September 2026

Yao Junyu (Chinese: 姚俊宇; pinyin: Yáo Jùnyǔ; born 9 January 2008) is a Chinese professional footballer who plays as a midfielder, attacking midfielder, or winger for China League One club Ningbo FC.

== Early life and youth career ==
Yao Junyu was born on 9 January 2008 in Lijiang, Yunnan, China. He is of Naxi ethnicity.

From 2013 to 2016, Yao trained at Lijiang Ancient City Football School and represented both the school and Lijiang Yuanheng Football Club in various youth competitions within Yunnan Province. In 2018, at the age of 10, he entered the Shandong Luneng Taishan youth academy.

== Club career ==
=== Ningbo Professional ===
On 12 July 2026, China League One club Ningbo Professional officially announced the signing of Yao Junyu. He was given the squad number 42.

On 13 July 2026, in the 14th round of the China League One, Ningbo defeated Foshan Nanshi 1–0. Yao Junyu came on as a substitute in the 81st minute, making his professional league debut. It was reported that he joined the club as a free agent after his youth training agreement with Shandong Taishan expired, and Ningbo paid Shandong Taishan the corresponding youth training compensation.

On 22 August 2026, in the 20th round of the China League One, Ningbo faced Yanbian Longding at home, and Yao Junyu received his first starting opportunity for the club. In the match, he delivered a cross from the right flank that created a threat and later had a chance that was close to a one-on-one opportunity.

On 30 August 2026, in the 21st round of the China League One, Ningbo drew 1–1 with Meizhou Hakka. In the 17th minute, Yao Junyu received the ball on the left side and quickly sent a cross into the box, which Yao Diran headed in to give Ningbo the lead.

As of 18 September 2026, Yao Junyu had made 8 appearances and contributed 1 assist for Ningbo Professional.

== International career ==
In September 2023, Yao Junyu was selected for the China U15 national team to participate in the 2023 EAFF U15 Boys' Football Championship held in Qingdao. During the tournament, he made 5 appearances, scored 2 goals, and provided 1 assist, helping the team win the championship. In the final against Japan U15, which ended 0–0 in regular time, China won 4–2 on penalties, and Yao Junyu scored his penalty in the shootout.

In 2024, Yao Junyu was called up to the China U16 national team and traveled with the team to Germany for a training camp. During this camp, he performed well and earned the opportunity to train with a Bundesliga youth team. He and Yang Qiandong were selected to stay for an additional week of integrated training with the Bayer Leverkusen U16 team.

In October 2024, Yao Junyu was included in the China U17 national team squad for the U17 Asian Cup qualifiers. On 27 October 2024, in the final group match against South Korea U16, he scored the equalizing goal in the 45th minute, helping China draw 2–2 and qualify for the 2025 AFC U-17 Asian Cup. For his performances throughout the year, he was nominated for the 2024 China Golden Boy Award (U17).

In April 2025, Yao Junyu participated in the 2025 AFC U-17 Asian Cup with the China U17 team. In the first group match against Saudi Arabia U17 on 4 April 2025, he started the match and in the 11th minute nearly intercepted the opponent's goalkeeper but was unable to get a shot away.

On 18 September 2026, the Chinese Football Association announced the U19 national team's fourth training camp list for 2026, and Yao Junyu was selected.

== Career statistics ==
=== Club ===
As of 23 September 2026

Appearances and goals by club, season and competition
Club	Season	League			National Cup		Continental		Other		Total	
Club	Season	Division	Apps	Goals	Apps	Goals	Apps	Goals	Apps	Goals	Apps	Goals
Ningbo Professional	2026	China League One	8	0	0	0	—		—		8	0
Career total			8	0	0	0	0	0	0	0	8	0

== Honours ==
China U15

- EAFF U-15 Men's Championship: 2023
