= Wei Zijian =

Chinese professional footballer

Personal information
- Full name: 魏子健
- Date of birth: 11 March 2008 (age 18)
- Place of birth: Ma'anshan, Anhui, China
- Height: 1.80 m (5 ft 11 in)
- Position: Forward

Team information
- Current team: Zhejiang U20
- Number: 87

Youth career
- Zhejiang Youth

Senior career*
Years	Team	Apps	(Gls)
2025–	Zhejiang U20	8	(2)

International career^{‡}
2025	China U17	3	(0)
2026–	China U19		
- * Club domestic league appearances and goals as of 12 November 2026 ‡ National team caps and goals as of 12 November 2026

Wei Zijian (Chinese: 魏子健; pinyin: Wèi Zǐjiàn; born 11 March 2008) is a Chinese professional footballer who plays as a forward for Zhejiang U20.

== Early life and youth career ==
Wei Zijian was born on 11 March 2008. He was registered with Zhejiang Youth before transferring to Zhejiang U20 on 1 July 2025.

== Club career ==
=== Zhejiang U20 ===
On 15 July 2026, Wei scored twice in a 3–2 win over Shaanxi United U20 in the Chinese Youth Football League U20, including a header in the 25th minute and a stoppage-time winner. On 11 November 2026, Wei started in the China Youth Football League (Men's U-20) final for Zhejiang U20 against Shanghai Shenhua U20. In the 87th minute, his penalty was saved by the goalkeeper, but he converted the rebound to reduce the deficit to 1–2. The match ended 2–2 after extra time, and Zhejiang U20 won 4–3 on penalties.

== International career ==
In February 2025, Wei was named in the China U17 squad for the second training camp of 2025, in preparation for the 2025 AFC U-17 Asian Cup. In April 2025, he started in China U17's 2–0 win over Thailand U17 in the final group match of the tournament and was replaced by Bunyamin at half-time.

In November 2026, Wei was called up to the China U19 training camp after his performances for Zhejiang U20.

== Career statistics ==
=== Club ===
As of 12 November 2026

Appearances and goals by club, season and competition
Club	Season	League			National Cup		Continental		Other		Total	
Club	Season	Division	Apps	Goals	Apps	Goals	Apps	Goals	Apps	Goals	Apps	Goals
Zhejiang U20	2025	U20 League	2	1	—		—		—		2	1
Zhejiang U20	2025	U20 League	6	1	—		—		—		6	1
Career total			8	2	0	0	0	0	0	0	8	2

== Honours ==
Zhejiang U20

- Chinese Youth Football League U20: 2026
