= China Youth Football League (Men's U-20) =

Youth football league in China

CFA U21 League
- Current season, competition or edition: 2026 season
- Classification: Youth development league
- Sport: Association football
- Founded: 2014
- Founder: Chinese Football Association
- No. of teams: 19 (2025 season)
- Country: China
- Confederation: AFC
- Most recent champion: Dalian Yingbo (2025)
- Level on pyramid: U21 Echelon

The CFA U21 League is an under-21 echelon competition organized by the Chinese Football Association (CFA). Established in 2014, it serves as a high-level competition platform for young Chinese players and a crucial talent pipeline for Chinese football. Starting from 2025, the league has been integrated into the China Football Youth Elite League as part of a broader restructuring of China's youth football competition system.

== History ==
=== Early years (2014–2020) ===
The U21 League was founded by the Chinese Football Association in 2014. Its primary objectives were to provide competitive playing opportunities for young players from professional clubs and to identify and develop talent for the national team. The initial scale of the competition was relatively small, primarily involving the U21 echelons of professional clubs.

=== Reform and development (2021–2024) ===
The league was restarted in 2021 after a hiatus caused by the COVID-19 pandemic. Significant reforms were implemented for the 2022 season, leading to improvements in the competition structure. A major incentive was introduced in the 2023 season: the champion and runner-up of the U21 League earned direct promotion to the following season's China League Two (the third tier of Chinese football), which significantly enhanced the league's competitiveness and appeal.

=== Integration and improvement (2025) ===
On April 30, 2025, the China Football Professional League Federation officially announced the integration of U21, U17, and U15 echelon events under the unified banner of the "China Football Youth Elite League". The U21 League became a core component of this new structure, marking a significant step in the further development of China's youth football competition system.

=== Restructuring and reform (2026–present) ===
In 2026, the China Football Professional League Federation (CFL) announced the creation of a new U20 League, merging the previous under-19 and U21 competitions under the China Youth Football League. The CFL stated it would no longer require Chinese Super League clubs to enter teams, and the competition was opened to social institutions and school teams alongside professional club academies. The inaugural U20 League season featured 28 teams, including 13 Chinese Super League academy sides, five from China League One, five from China League Two, two from the China Amateur Football League, two social academies, and one school team.

The competition adopted a three-stage format. The first stage consisted of two ranking rounds held in Tangshan, Kunming, and Meizhou from 24 April to 21 May, using a snake arrangement to divide the 28 teams based on weighted results from the previous season's U21, U19, and U17 leagues. Following the ranking stage, teams were divided into four tiers: Group A (1st–6th), Group B (7th–12th), Group C (13th–18th), and Group D (19th–24th).

The second and third stages introduced a home-and-away double round-robin format for Groups A and B, comprising 10 rounds each, while Groups C and D continued with tournament-based single round-robin matches of five rounds. A promotion and relegation mechanism was established between the tiers. The bottom teams in higher groups faced the top teams of lower groups in single-match playoffs, while the lowest team in Group C and the highest team in Group D exchanged positions automatically.

The second stage commenced on 13 June 2026. Group A comprised Shanghai Shenhua, Zhejiang, Tianjin Jinmen Tiger, Shenzhen Xinpengcheng, Shaanxi Union, and Guangdong Guangzhou Leopard. Group B consisted of Henan, Beijing Guoan, Shandong Taishan, Shanghai Port, Ningbo, and Hubei Youth Star. Matches were broadcast on Douyin, Football Channel APP, Leisu Sports, and Live Bar.

Player eligibility rules were adjusted for the U20 League. Eligible players were required to be born on or after 1 January 2006, with each team permitted to register a maximum of six over-age players aged 21 to 23 (with no more than two aged 23), and no more than three over-age players allowed on the pitch simultaneously. Teams could also register up to 12 under-age players aged 16 to 17.

The qualification pathway to professional football was modified. The U20 League champion earned the right to compete in a promotion playoff against the fourth-placed team of the China Amateur Football League (CMCL) for a single berth in the following season's China League Two, representing 0.5 of a promotion place. This represented a reduction from the previous two direct promotion spots available to the U21 League. Additionally, the 2026 season rules stipulated that clubs with B-teams already competing in China League Two were not required to enter the U20 League, and that B-teams relegated from China League Two would drop into the U20 League rather than the CMCL.

The championship was determined through a potential playoff between the Group A leaders of the second and third stages; if the same team topped both stages, it was crowned champion automatically.

On 10 April 2026, the CFL and the Premier League co-hosted a youth development exchange conference in Beijing, ahead of the U20 League launch. The event brought together 49 representatives from Chinese Super League, China League One, and China League Two clubs, including investors, general managers, youth development heads, technical directors, and coaches, to discuss youth development systems and player pathways with Premier League experts. The CFL indicated that the U20 League structure could evolve toward a tiered system with separate super and first divisions in future seasons, with the top tier operating a full home-and-away schedule.

== Competition format (2025) ==
The tournament format combines knockout and double round-robin stages, culminating in a total of 312 matches per season.

The league is structured in four main phases:

- Group Stage: Held in mid-to-late April, played in a home-and-away format.
- Preliminary Stage: Takes place in mid-to-early May, mid-to-early July, and mid-August.
- Promotion Stage: Held in mid-to-late September.
- Final Stage: Scheduled from late November to early December.

=== Eligibility and registration ===
- Participation is mandatory for Chinese Super League clubs. Chinese League one and Chinese League Two clubs are eligible to enter teams.
- A club's B team that has already qualified for China League Two may voluntarily choose to register.
- Each team must register a minimum of 18 and a maximum of 30 players at the start of the season, including at least two goalkeepers.
- The core playing squad consists of players born between January 1, 2004, and December 31, 2005.
- A maximum of 2 overage players (over U21) and a maximum of 15 younger players (under U21) can be registered.
- Foreign players, non-Chinese naturalized players, and players from Hong Kong, Macau, and Taiwan are not permitted to register.
- During matches, no more than 3 overage players are allowed on the field simultaneously.

=== Promotion policy ===
In the 2024 season the champion and runner-up of the U21 League obtain qualification to compete in the following season's China League Two, providing a direct pathway for young players to enter the professional league pyramid.

== Past champions ==
Season	Champion	Runner-up	Third Place	Remarks
2021/22	Beijing Guoan	—	—	Won the championship with an undefeated record
2023	Shandong Taishan	Shanghai Port	—	Champion and runner-up promoted to China League Two
2024	Wuhan Three Towns	Chengdu Rongcheng	Shanghai Shenhua	Champion and runner-up promoted
2025	Dalian Yingbo	Zhejiang	Shanghai Shenhua	Champion promoted to 2026 China League Two after playoff victory
2026	Zhejiang	Shanghai Shenhua		

== Development and impact ==
=== Talent production ===
The league has become a vital talent pool for China's national youth teams. In the past two selection cycles, 14 players from the U21 League have been called up to the Chinese U19 national team, including notable prospects such as Liu Chengyu, Wang Yifan, and Wang Yudong.

== Recent events ==
- November 12, 2025: The draw for the 2025 Chinese Champions League-U21 League play-offs was held in Beijing. The winners of these play-offs will secure the final spot for the 2026 China League Two season.
- November 2025: Promising young player Wang Yudong is reportedly scheduled to join the Zhejiang U21 team for the final stage of the U21 League to aid their push for a high finish.
- The 2024 season highlighted a significant competitive gap, with lopsided results such as Shanghai Shenhua U21's 6–0 victory over Cangzhou Lions U21, while the bottom-placed team remained on single-digit points, sparking debate about competitive balance.

== See also ==
- Chinese Football Association
- Chinese Super League
- China League One
- China League Two
- China Youth Football League
- Chinese Youth Football Elite League (Division U-17)
- Chinese Youth Football Elite League (Division U-15)
- Chinese football league system
