= Taito Kanda =

Japanese footballer (born 2004)

Personal information
- Date of birth: 7 May 2008 (age 18)
- Place of birth: Gunma Prefecture, Japan
- Height: 1.80 m (5 ft 11 in)
- Position: Midfielder

Team information
- Current team: RB Leipzig (on loan from RB Omiya Ardija)

Youth career
- RB Omiya Ardija
- 2026–: → RB Leipzig (loan)

Senior career*
Years	Team	Apps	(Gls)
2026–	RB Omiya Ardija	3	(0)
2026–	→ RB Leipzig (loan)	0	(0)

International career^{‡}
2024	Japan U16	6	(1)
2025	Japan U17	7	(0)
2026–	Japan U19	4	(0)
- * Club domestic league appearances and goals ‡ National team caps and goals as of 11 June 2026

Taito Kanda (神田 泰斗, Kanda Taito; born 4 June 2004), is a Japanese professional footballer who plays as a midfielder for RB Leipzig on loan from RB Omiya Ardija.

== Early life ==
Kanda was born on 4 June 2004 in Gunma Prefecture, Japan. Growing up, he regarded Japan international Shunsuke Nakamura as his football idol.

== Club career ==
As a youth player, Kanda joined the youth academy of RB Omiya Ardija. In 2025, he signed his first professional contract with the club at the age of seventeen.

On 3 April 2026, he debuted for their senior team during a 3–0 home win over FC Gifu in the league. Ahead of the 2026–27 season, he was sent on loan to the youth academy of German Bundesliga side RB Leipzig, where he played in the UEFA Youth League.

== International career ==
Kanda is a Japan youth international and has represented the country internationally at under-16, under-17 and under-19 levels. Altogether, he made six appearances and scored one goal while playing for the Japan national under-16 football team and made seven appearances and scored zero goals while playing for the Japan national under-17 football team.

On 19 February 2025, he debuted for the Japan national under-17 football team during a 3–2 away friendly win over the Paraguay national under-17 football team. During the spring of 2025, he played for the Japan national under-17 football team at the 2025 AFC U-17 Asian Cup.

== Style of play ==
Kanda plays as a midfielder and is left-footed. Japanese news website FOOTBALL ZONE wrote in that he "plays as a defensive midfielder, is a skilled playmaker who can call for passes from teammates in the gaps between opponents and distribute attacking passes. His accurate left foot is also a weapon in set pieces".
