= Bunyamin Abdusalam =

Chinese footballer (born 2008)

Personal information
- Date of birth: 9 April 2008 (age 18)
- Place of birth: Shawan County, Xinjiang, China
- Height: 1.83 m (6 ft 0 in)
- Position: Winger

Team information
- Current team: Yunnan Yukun
- Number: 39

Youth career
- –2025: Evergrande Football School

Senior career*
Years	Team	Apps	(Gls)
2026–	Yunnan Yukun	21	(5)

International career^{‡}
2024–2025	China U17	6	(1)
2026–	China U19	2	(0)
2026–	China	6	(0)
- * Club domestic league appearances and goals as of 19 November 2026 ‡ National team caps and goals as of 2 October 2026

Bunyamin Abdusalam (Chinese: 布尼亚明·阿不都沙拉木; born 9 April 2008) is a Chinese professional footballer who plays as a forward or left winger for Chinese Super League club Yunnan Yukun and the China national team.

== Early life ==
Bunyamin was born on 9 April 2008 in Tacheng, Xinjiang, China. Growing up, he started playing football at the age of three. In 2017, he joined Evergrande Football School.

In 2025, Bunyamin won a bronze medal for football at the under-18 level with Guangdong.

== Club career ==
=== Yunnan Yukun ===
On 13 February 2026, Bunyamin transferred to Chinese Super League club Yunnan Yukun after negotiations between the player, Evergrande Football School, and Yunnan Yukun. The transfer fee was reported to be 1 million yuan, with a clause for Evergrande Football School to receive a percentage of any future transfer fees.

== International career ==
Bunyamin has been called up to the China U15, U16, U17, U18, U19, and U22 national teams.

In May 2025, Bunyamin was called up to the China U22 national team along with teammate Wei Xiangxin. The squad trained in Dalian, Liaoning Province, from 23 May to 10 June 2025, and visited Belarus for friendly matches in preparation for the 2026 AFC U23 Asian Cup and the Nagoya Asian Games.

In November 2025, Bunyamin was named in the China U18 national team training camp.

=== U17 Asian Cup ===
Bunyamin represented China at the 2025 AFC U-17 Asian Cup. He featured in all three group stage matches and scored one goal during the tournament. In the third group match against Thailand on 10 April 2025, he came on as a substitute in the 46th minute, won and converted a penalty in the 56th minute, and provided an assist for Jiang Zhiqin three minutes later in a 2–0 victory.

=== Senior team ===
On 24 September 2026, Bunyamin made his debut for the senior China national team in a friendly against the Maldives.

== Honours ==
Guangdong U18

- National Games of China bronze medal: 2025

== Career statistics ==
=== Club ===
As of 14 June 2026

Appearances and goals by club, season and competition
Club	Season	League			National Cup		Continental		Other		Total	
Club	Season	Division	Apps	Goals	Apps	Goals	Apps	Goals	Apps	Goals	Apps	Goals
Yunnan Yukun	2026	Chinese Super League	14	1	0	0	—		—		14	1
Career total			14	1	0	0	0	0	0	0	14	1
