= 2022 China Youth Football League =

The 1st China Youth Football League is the first national youth football league distinguished by its integration of sports and education. It is organized under the guidance of the Ministry of Education and the General Administration of Sports of China and sponsored by the Chinese Football Association.

== History ==
The league was officially launched on July 10, 2022, at the Huanglong Sports Center in Hangzhou, Zhejiang Province. The launching ceremony was attended by notable figures including Deputy Minister of Education Zhong Denghua, deputy director of the General Administration of Sports of the People's Republic of China Li Jianming, Vice Governor of Zhejiang Province Cheng Yue Chong, and Chairman of the Chinese Football Association Chen Xuyuan. Over 3,000 teachers, students, and parents from 10 schools in Hangzhou participated in the event. The league was officially announced by Chen Xuyuan.

== Competition structure ==
The 1st China Youth Football League National Finals for the Men's Junior High School Age Group (U13/U15 Group) commenced on August 1, 2022. The U13 competition was held in Changchun City and Longjing City, Jilin Province, lasting 10 days and divided into 8 groups with a single round-robin format. The top two teams from each group advanced to the knockout round, which took place in Longjing City from August 13 to 22. The U15 competition followed a similar structure, with group stages held in Shenyang, Langfang, Tangshan, and Fushun, and the knockout rounds in Changchun.

=== Notable matches ===
- U13 Group Round 1:
  - Changchun Yatai First Team defeated Zunyi Football School 5–1.
  - Changchun Yatai Second Team defeated Shaanxi Normal University High School 5–1.
  - Beijing Tongxing lost 0–1 to Hubei Xinghui.
  - Shenzhen Luohu Cuiyuan Shenzu defeated Dalian 2–1.
  - Guangzhou City Affiliated High School defeated Nanning Runhua 6–0.
- U15 Group Round 1:
  - Shanghai Port defeated Xinjiang Yining No. 2 Middle School 5–0.
  - Beijing Guoan defeated Datong Sports School No. 3 Middle School 2–1.
  - Shandong Taishan defeated Shenzhen Experimental School 4–1.
  - Wuhan Three Towns defeated Shenzhen Dingsheng 6–0.
  - Zhejiang Zheneng Greentown defeated Kunming Zheng 4–1.

=== Key events ===
- August 5, 2022: Hainan Qiongzhong Men's Football U15 team won their fourth consecutive group stage match in Tangshan Nanhu Football Park, securing the top position in Group D.
- August 15, 2022: In the 1/8 finals, Changchun Yatai U15 team advanced to the quarterfinals by defeating Jiangyin Lizhong Kaisheng U15 team 3–1.
- September 3, 2022: Ürümqi Senior High School team won the first phase of the Men's High School Age Group (U17 Group) with a record of 4 wins.
- September 4, 2022: Ürümqi Senior High School team won the championship in the first phase and advanced to the national finals.
- September 9, 2022: The Women's U15 Group National Finals kicked off at Suzhou Taihu Base, with Hainan Qiongzhong Women's Football U15 defeating Hohhot Mengxiao Women's Football Team 4–0.
- September 19, 2022: The quarterfinals of the Women's U15 Group were held, with Hainan Qiongzhong U15 team competing against Sichuan U15 team.
- October 3, 2022: The Women's U13 Group completed the group stage in Suzhou, Jiangsu, with Hainan Qiongzhong Women's Football team advancing to the round of 16 knockouts.
- October 2022: The U13 Women's Group concluded, with Hainan Qiongzhong Women's Football Team securing the 13th place.

=== U17 and U19 group finals ===
- November 16, 2022: The Chinese Football Association announced the schedule for the first China Youth League Men's High School Age U17 Group National Finals and the final stage of the Men's High School Age U19 Group National Finals. The Soka Sports Training Base in Zhuhai won the qualification to host the 1st to 8th qualifying matches in the U17 group and the 1st to 6th qualifying matches in the U19 group.
- November 18, 2022: The competition started in the Beihai Division with the first leg of the 17th-24
