= Kim Ye-geon =

South Korean footballer (born 2008)

Personal information
- Full name: Kim Ye-geon
- Date of birth: 7 August 2008 (age 18)
- Place of birth: Jeonju, South Korea
- Height: 1.70 m (5 ft 7 in)
- Positions: Midfielder; winger

Team information
- Current team: Red Star Belgrade
- Number: 19

Youth career
- –2020: Cheongju FCK
- 2021–2025: Jeonbuk Hyundai Motors

Senior career*
Years	Team	Apps	(Gls)
2026	Jeonbuk Hyundai Motors B	12	(3)
2026	Jeonbuk Hyundai Motors	8	(1)
2026–	Red Star Belgrade	3	(0)

International career^{‡}
2023	South Korea U15	6	(7)
2024	South Korea U16	6	(0)
2024–2025	South Korea U17	3	(0)
- * Club domestic league appearances and goals as of 20 September 2026 ‡ National team caps and goals as of 15 November 2025

Kim Ye-geon (Korean: 김예건; born 7 August 2008) is a South Korean footballer who plays as a midfielder or winger for Red Star Belgrade.

== Early life ==
Kim was born on 7 August 2008 in South Korea. Growing up, he attended Geumsan Middle School in South Korea. Subsequently, he attended Jeonju Youngsaeng High School in South Korea.

== Club career ==
As a youth player, Kim joined the youth academy of Cheongju FCK. Following his stint there, he joined the youth academy of Jeonbuk Hyundai Motors ahead of the 2021 season and was promoted to the club's senior team in 2026, where he made eight league appearances and scored one goal.

On 4 July 2026, he debuted for the club during a 1–2 home loss to Gangwon FC in the league. On 11 July 2026, he scored his first goal for them during a 3–1 away win over Ulsan HD FC in the league, becoming the youngest player to win K League Goal of the Month. Subsequently, he signed for Serbian side Red Star Belgrade in 2026.

== International career ==
Kim is a South Korea youth international and has represented the country internationally at under-15, under-16 and under-17 level. Altogether, he made six appearances and scored seven goals while playing for the South Korea national under-15 football team and six appearances and scored zero goals while playing for the South Korea national under-16 football team.

During the spring of 2025, he played for the South Korea national under-17 football team at the 2025 AFC U-17 Asian Cup. The same year, he played for the South Korea national under-17 football team at the 2025 FIFA U-17 World Cup.

== Style of play ==
Kim plays as a midfielder or winger and is right-footed. South Korean news website Football Asian wrote in 2026 that he is a "player evaluated as possessing well-rounded technical skills, game understanding, and attacking development abilities".
