= EAFF U-15 Men's Championship =

East Asian association football tournament for men's national youth teams

- Organiser(s): EAFF
- Region: East Asia
- Teams: 9
- Current champions: China (1st title)
- Website: eaff.com
- 2023 EAFF U-15 Men's Championship

EAFF U15 Men's Championship is a men's international youth football competition in East Asia for member nations of the East Asian Football Federation (EAFF). There is a separate competition for men and women.

The inaugural edition was held in China in 2018, but its champions were not decided under its rule. China became the inaugural champions at the second edition in 2023.

== Results ==
| Edition | Year | Hosts | Champions | Runners-up | Third place | Fourth place |
|---|---|---|---|---|---|---|
| 1 | 2018 | China | Not decided | | | |
| 2 | 2023 | China | China | Japan | South Korea | Chinese Taipei |
| 3 | 2025 | China | Japan | South Korea | China | Hong Kong |

== See also ==
- EAFF E-1 Football Championship
