= China Youth Football League =

National youth football league in China

China Youth Football League 中国青少年足球联赛
- Organising body: Ministry of Education, State General Administration of Sport, Chinese Football Association
- Founded: 2022
- First season: 2022
- Country: China
- Confederation: AFC
- Divisions: Primary school (U8–U12); Junior high school (U13–U15); High school (U16–U17); University (U18–U19)
- Level on pyramid: Youth development pyramid
- Current champions: Shandong Taishan U19 (2024 U19组)
- Most championships: Shandong Taishan (5 titles across age groups)
- Broadcaster(s): CCTV-5, regional sports networks
- Website: 中国青少年足球联赛官网
- Current: 2026

China Youth Football League (CYFL) (simplified Chinese: 中国青少年足球联赛; traditional Chinese: 中國青少年足球聯賽; pinyin: Zhōngguó Qīngshàonián Zúqiú Liánsài) is a national youth football league in China, established in 2022 by the Ministry of Education, the General Administration of Sports of the People's Republic of China, and the Chinese Football Association. The league aims to promote football development among young people in China, improve youth football, and cultivate future talents for the national teams.

== League structure ==
=== The CYFL is divided into four age groups ===
- Primary school (U8-U12)
- Junior high school (U13-U15)
- High school (U16-U17)
- University (U18-U19)

== History ==
On February 8, 2022, the Ministry of Education announced that they will hold the first China Youth Football League in 2022.

On July 10, the launching ceremony of the first China Youth Football League was held at the Huanglong Sports Center in Hangzhou.

On August 1, the first China Youth Football League National Finals officially opened, gathering 59 U13 teams and 60 U15 teams in Changchun, Longjing, Shenyang, Langfang, Tangshan and Fushun to sound the rallying call for the group stage.

On November 30, 2023, the Chinese Football Association released the logo of the China Youth Football League.

In February 2023, in the preliminaries of the 2022 China Youth Football League (Shanghai Division) and the 3rd Shanghai Youth Football Club League, Jiading Huilong U15 defeated Jing'an U15 with a score of 4:0 and won the U15 group championship with 7 games, 5 wins, 1 draw and 1 loss.

On February 26, 2022, the first China Youth Football League (Chongqing Division) and Chongqing Youth Football Championship U9 and U11 groups were matched, and the Liangjiang Education Football Team was in the U11 group8 games, 7 wins and 1 draw won the championship. The U9 group of Liangjiang Education Football Team won the runner-up with 8 wins, 2 draws and 1 loss.

In March, the 2023 2nd China Youth Football League (Men's High School Age U17 Group) Southern Qualifiers kicked off in the Duyun Division, and 21 teams from southern China competed for the next level of competition through six days of competition.

== The age group of the event ==
The competition composition of the China Youth Football League is divided into four parts according to the participating age groups, with a total of 18 groups for men and women, including 10 groups for boys and girls in the primary school age group U8 and U12; Boys' junior high school age group U13 and U15 group, boys' high school age group U17 group; U13, U15, U17 groups for girls' junior and senior high school age groups; Men's U19 and Women's U19 at the college/university level.
