= Evergrande Football School =

Football school in Guangdong, China

- 恒大足球学校
- Qingyuan, Guangdong Province; China

Information
- Type: Football academy
- Motto: "Revitalize Chinese Football, Cultivate Football Stars"
- Established: September 2012
- Founder: Xu Jiayin (Evergrande Group)
- President: Liu Qian (since 2023)
- Staff: Approximately 100 (as of 2023)
- Enrollment: Approximately 400 (as of 2023)
- Campus size: 1,880 mu (approximately 1.25 km^{2})
- Affiliation: Guangzhou FC (formerly)

Evergrande Football School (Chinese: 恒大足球学校) is a football school located in Qingyuan, Guangdong, China. Owned by the Evergrande Group, it is a full-time boarding primary and secondary football school. It is the largest football academy in the world.

== History ==
=== Establishment and Early Years (2012–2017) ===
Evergrande Football School opened in September 2012 following an initial investment of 1.9 billion yuan by the Evergrande Group. The school was established during a period when China's youth football development faced significant challenges, with the number of traditional football schools having declined from over 4,000 to approximately 20 nationwide.

The school's cultural education curriculum was developed in partnership with the High School Affiliated to Renmin University of China (RDFZ), while football training was initially overseen by coaches hired by the Spanish company SOXNA, who were certified by Real Madrid Foundation. In October 2014, the school established a Spanish branch in Madrid under the direct development of SOXNA, sending 25 students annually to receive training in Spain.

During its first five years, the school focused on expanding China's football population and building a talent foundation. The student body reached its peak of 3,500 students during the 2016–2017 period, of which 2,800 were regular students paying tuition fees.

=== Transition to Elite-Only Model (2018–2020) ===
In 2017, Evergrande Group chairman Xu Jiayin announced that Guangzhou FC would transition to an "all-Chinese" squad by 2020, shifting investment focus from the senior team to youth development. This led to significant changes at the football school.

In 2018, the school implemented an "all-elite, all-free" policy under the leadership of its second president, Wang Yajun. Regular fee-paying students were phased out, and the school retained only elite players who received free tuition, accommodation, meals, and training. The student population was reduced from 3,500 to 1,200, and teaching staff was cut from 500 to approximately 100.

By 2019, the school had 63 players selected for various age-group national teams, setting a record at the time. The annual cost to train each elite student was approximately 250,000 yuan, significantly higher than the 100,000-yuan average at other football schools.

=== Financial Crisis and Independence (2021–present) ===
In 2021, the Evergrande Group's financial crisis affected the football school, with reports indicating that no funding was provided by the group that year. The school faced potential closure but managed to continue operations through cost-cutting measures and commercial initiatives.

In May 2023, Liu Qian became the school's third president and announced that the school had become fully independent from the Evergrande Group. By October 2023, the school reported achieving financial self-sufficiency, with revenue of 82 million yuan in 2022 and a small surplus.

Following the dissolution of Guangzhou FC in January 2025, the school lost its primary pathway for graduates to enter professional football. The school subsequently established partnerships with other clubs, including an agreement with Guangzhou Dandelion FC in January 2025 to provide players for the club's 2025 season.

== Facilities ==
The school occupies 1,880 mu (approximately 1.25 square kilometers) of land in Qingyuan, Guangdong Province. The campus includes 50 football pitches, including seven high-quality natural grass fields (two with floodlights) and one FIFA-certified artificial turf pitch.

Additional facilities include a 6,000-square-meter football center building, a 2,000-square-meter international-standard physical training center, a 3,000-square-meter gymnasium, a 1,500-square-meter library, an 1,800-square-meter auditorium, and student dormitories covering 21,000 square meters.

== Academic and Training Programs ==
The school operates a "5+5" training model, with students aged 9–13 receiving domestic training at the Qingyuan campus, followed by five years of overseas development for selected elite players at the Spanish branch.

As of 2025, the school offers enrollment for football elite students (born 2009–2017), football and sports specialty students (grades 3–12), and senior high school students. Tuition fees range from 16,500 yuan per semester for primary school to 23,500 yuan per semester for high school, with accommodation costing 3,000 yuan per academic year. Elite students continue to receive full scholarships covering all expenses.
