= 2026 Maurice Revello Tournament squads =

International association football tournament

The 2026 Maurice Revello Tournament was an international association football tournament held in Var, France. The ten national teams involved in the tournament were required to register a squad of players; only players in these squads were eligible to take part in the tournament.

== Group A ==
=== Saudi Arabia ===
Head coach: TBC

No.	Pos.	Player	Date of birth (age)	Club
1		Yazan Al-Ruwaili	19 May 2005 (aged 21)	(Saudi Arabian Football Federation) Al-Hazem
2		Sultan Al-Essa	30 June 2005 (aged 20)	(Saudi Arabian Football Federation) Al-Najma
3		Abdulaziz Al-Suwailem	24 April 2006 (aged 20)	(Saudi Arabian Football Federation) Al-Fateh
4		Samer Ahmed Al-Marwani	13 May 2006 (aged 20)	(Saudi Arabian Football Federation) Al-Raed
5		Mohammed Ali Barnawi	7 August 2005 (aged 20)	(Saudi Arabian Football Federation) Al-Hilal
6		Awad Dahal	23 February 2005 (aged 21)	(Saudi Arabian Football Federation) Al-Ettifaq
7		Khalid Abduljawad	10 February 2005 (aged 21)	(Saudi Arabian Football Federation) Al-Hazem
8		Rakan Al-Ghamdi	6 September 2005 (aged 20)	(Royal Dutch Football Association) NEC
9		Saad Haqawi	8 October 2005 (aged 20)	(Saudi Arabian Football Federation) Al-Nassr
10		Sabri Dahal	29 February 2008 (aged 18)	(Saudi Arabian Football Federation) Al-Fayha
11		Thamer Al-Khaibri	3 December 2005 (aged 20)	(Saudi Arabian Football Federation) Al-Khaleej
12		Eyad Housa	21 November 2006 (aged 19)	(Saudi Arabian Football Federation) Al-Qadsiah
13		Bassam Hazazi	29 March 2005 (aged 21)	(Saudi Arabian Football Federation) Al-Nassr
14		Saad Al-Mutairi	6 December 2006 (aged 19)	(Saudi Arabian Football Federation) Al-Hilal
15		Abdul Aziz Al-Fawaz	28 March 2008 (aged 18)	(Saudi Arabian Football Federation) Al-Fateh
16		Ali Alhussain Boulahrech	4 June 2005 (aged 20)	(Saudi Arabian Football Federation) Al-Fayha
17		Suhayb Al-Hawsawi	6 May 2007 (aged 19)	(Saudi Arabian Football Federation) Al-Ittihad
18		Aseel Abdulrazaq	28 November 2006 (aged 19)	(Saudi Arabian Football Federation) Al-Ula
19		Awad Aman	16 January 2005 (aged 21)	(Saudi Arabian Football Federation) Al-Nassr
20		Adnan Al-Bishri	22 April 2006 (aged 20)	(Saudi Arabian Football Federation) Al-Ittihad
21		Abdulrahman Al-Ghamdi	13 February 2006 (aged 20)	(Saudi Arabian Football Federation) Al-Arabi
22		Hamed Al-Shanqity	20 April 2005 (aged 21)	(Saudi Arabian Football Federation) Al-Ittihad
23		Yazan Madani	7 September 2005 (aged 20)	(Saudi Arabian Football Federation) Al-Ahli
24		Jalal Al-Salem	12 June 2005 (aged 20)	(Saudi Arabian Football Federation) Al-Ettifaq
25		Saud Haroun	19 July 2005 (aged 20)	(Saudi Arabian Football Federation) Al-Hilal
26		Ahmed Al-Siyahi	20 February 2005 (aged 21)	(Saudi Arabian Football Federation) Al-Riyadh
27		Turki Al-Ghumayl	2 February 2005 (aged 21)	(Saudi Arabian Football Federation) Al-Hilal
28		Amar Hamed Alyuhaybi	3 March 2006 (aged 20)	(Saudi Arabian Football Federation) Al-Qadsiah

=== China ===
Head coach: (Serbia) Dejan Đurđević

No.	Pos.	Player	Date of birth (age)	Club
1		Ihsen Ilham	8 August 2008 (aged 17)	(Chinese Football Association) Shandong Taishan
2		Chen Zihan	30 November 2007 (aged 18)	(Chinese Football Association) Shandong Taishan
4		Elnizar Lohman	30 November 2007 (aged 18)	(Chinese Football Association) Evergrande Football School
5		Yue Ruijie	20 November 2007 (aged 18)	(Chinese Football Association) Chongqing Tonglianglong
7		Yang Mingrui	5 April 2007 (aged 19)	(Chinese Football Association) Dalian Yingbo
8		Zhang Jiaming	7 March 2007 (aged 19)	(Football Association of Serbia) Voždovac
9		Wei Xiangxin	5 March 2008 (aged 18)	(Chinese Football Association) Meizhou Hakka
10		Jia Weiwei	22 February 2007 (aged 19)	(Chinese Football Association) Qingdao West Coast
11		Miao Rundong	22 May 2007 (aged 19)	(Chinese Football Association) Jiangsu Changjin
12		Fan Mengtong	21 March 2007 (aged 19)	(Chinese Football Association) Guangzhou Dandelion
13		Huang Shenghao	1 August 2007 (aged 18)	(Chinese Football Association) Guangdong GZ-Power
14		Liu Jiale	12 February 2008 (aged 18)	(Chinese Football Association) Chongqing Tonglianglong
15		Guo Wuyue	8 May 2007 (aged 19)	(Chinese Football Association) Shaanxi Union
16		Wu Zhicheng	15 September 2007 (aged 18)	(Chinese Football Association) Changchun Yatai
17		Bunyamin Abdusalam	9 April 2008 (aged 18)	(Chinese Football Association) Yunnan Yukun
18		Alexander Chujun Xie	5 May 2007 (aged 19)	(German Football Association) Stuttgart
19		Deng Jiefu	28 June 2007 (aged 18)	(Chinese Football Association) Beijing Guoan
20		Jiang Yixiang	20 January 2008 (aged 18)	(Chinese Football Association) Jiangxi Dingnan United
21		Ye Wenjie	19 June 2007 (aged 18)	(Chinese Football Association) Jiangsu Changjin
23		An Zhicheng	15 January 2007 (aged 19)	(Chinese Football Association) Changchun Yatai
24		Zhang Tongrui Zhang	31 December 2007 (aged 18)	(Chinese Football Association) Jiangsu Changjin
26		Zhu Xinyu	7 May 2008 (aged 18)	(Chinese Football Association) Guangdong Mingtu
27		Song Hengda	28 June 2007 (aged 18)	(Chinese Football Association) Jiangsu Changjin
28		Peng Shunjie	3 July 2007 (aged 18)	(Chinese Football Association) Dalian Yingbo
30		Yang Zhanpeng	5 March 2007 (aged 19)	(Chinese Football Association) Qingdao West Coast
31		Wang Gengrui	16 September 2008 (aged 17)	(Chinese Football Association) Qingdao West Coast

=== Colombia ===
Head coach: César Torres

No.	Pos.	Player	Date of birth (age)	Club
1	GK	Juan Covilla	21 September 2008 (aged 17)	(Colombian Football Federation) Deportes Tolima
2	DF	Antonio Simancas	12 April 2007 (aged 19)	(Colombian Football Federation) Alianza Valledupar
3	DF	Leandro Solarte	9 March 2007 (aged 19)	(Argentine Football Association) Racing Club
4	DF	Jhon Tenorio	17 August 2007 (aged 18)	(Colombian Football Federation) Independiente Santa Fe
5	DF	Carlos Pérez	7 September 2007 (aged 18)	(Colombian Football Federation) Junior FC
6	MF	Edmilson Herazo	19 September 2008 (aged 17)	(Colombian Football Federation) Barranquilla FC
7	FW	Duvan Mina Aponza	10 October 2008 (aged 17)	(Colombian Football Federation) América de Cali
8	MF	Juan David Aponza	24 May 2008 (aged 18)	(Colombian Football Federation) América de Cali
9	FW	Jesús Chinchia	3 March 2007 (aged 19)	(Colombian Football Federation) Atlético Nacional
10	MF	Juan Rosa	4 July 2007 (aged 18)	(Colombian Football Federation) Atlético Nacional
11	FW	Cristian Uribe	7 October 2007 (aged 18)	(Colombian Football Federation) Atlético Nacional
12	GK	Matías Lozano	23 June 2007 (aged 18)	(Colombian Football Federation) Atlético Nacional
13	DF	Santiago Arrechea Cardenas	20 January 2007 (aged 19)	(Colombian Football Federation) Orsomarso
14	MF	Robinho Quinto	20 November 2007 (aged 18)	(Argentine Football Association) River Plate
15	DF	Jaidinson Córdoba	12 December 2007 (aged 18)	(Colombian Football Federation) Deportivo Independiente Medellín
15	FW	Geronimo Mancilla	29 December 2008 (aged 17)	(Colombian Football Federation) Deportivo Independiente Medellín
16	MF	Matias Orozco	1 December 2007 (aged 18)	(Colombian Football Federation) Deportivo Cali
17	MF	Carlos Londoño	10 January 2007 (aged 19)	(Colombian Football Federation) Águilas Doradas
18	MF	Jimmy Martínez	20 March 2007 (aged 19)	(Colombian Football Federation) Independiente Santa Fe
19	FW	Alan García	8 August 2007 (aged 18)	(Colombian Football Federation) Independiente Yumbo
20	MF	Juan Palacios	10 October 2007 (aged 18)	(Colombian Football Federation) Independiente Yumbo
21	DF	Miguel Solarte	11 January 2008 (aged 18)	(Football Association of the Czech Republic) Slavia Prague
22	DF	Junior Mosquera	26 March 2007 (aged 19)	(Colombian Football Federation) Internacional de Palmira

=== DR Congo ===
Head coach: TBC

No.	Pos.	Player	Date of birth (age)	Club
1		Steve Tchokokam	23 January 2005 (aged 21)	(Italian Football Federation) Obermais
2		Kyllian Kolela	23 July 2006 (aged 19)	(Portuguese Football Federation) SC Braga
3		Filozofe Mabete	14 March 2005 (aged 21)	(The Football Association) Swindon Town
4		Prince Mbatshi	11 January 2006 (aged 20)	(French Football Federation) Lyon
5		Ethan Kena Kabeya	22 July 2006 (aged 19)	(French Football Federation) Villefranche
6		Jules Ahoka	8 May 2006 (aged 20)	(Royal Belgian Football Association) Royal Antwerp
7		Arthur Spadoni	25 June 2007 (aged 18)	(Italian Football Federation) Torino
8		Josue Kimboma	24 April 2006 (aged 20)	(French Football Federation) Caen
10		Messy Mubundu	5 January 2006 (aged 20)	(French Football Federation) Amiens
13		Ludovick Wola	3 September 2006 (aged 19)	(Royal Belgian Football Association) RSCA Futures
13		Jordi Kuange Makala	9 September 2005 (aged 20)	(French Football Federation) Nantes
13		Kiton Ekoli	10 November 2006 (aged 19)	(Portuguese Football Federation) SC Braga
14		Honoré Bayanginisa	27 January 2005 (aged 21)	(French Football Federation) Sochaux
15		Manoel Verhaeghe	25 March 2008 (aged 18)	(Royal Belgian Football Association) RWDM Brussels
16		Lény Roland	9 March 2006 (aged 20)	(Royal Belgian Football Association) Royal Aywaille
19		Nehemie Lurika	26 August 2007 (aged 18)	(French Football Federation) Lyon
20		Oscar Kabwit	5 May 2005 (aged 21)	(Swiss Football Association) FC Lucerne
21		Ryan Tutu	1 April 2005 (aged 21)	(French Football Federation) Caen
22		David Furst	3 April 2007 (aged 19)	(German Football Association) FC Köln
22		Nathan Mulumba	2 February 2005 (aged 21)	Unattached
25		Joel Kana Katoto	5 August 2006 (aged 19)	(Royal Belgian Football Association) RSCA Futures
26		Noah Makanza	14 January 2005 (aged 21)	(Royal Dutch Football Association) Helmond Sport
27		Joe Balumuene	2 April 2005 (aged 21)	(Gibraltar Football Association) Glacis United
43		Daniel Tshilanda	27 April 2006 (aged 20)	(Royal Belgian Football Association) Sporting Hasselt

=== Tunisia ===
Head coach: TBC

No.	Pos.	Player	Date of birth (age)	Club
0		Rayane Rehimi	31 December 2005 (aged 20)	(Tunisian Football Federation) CA Bizertin
1	GK	Anas Khardani	2 January 2006 (aged 20)	(Qatar Football Association) Muaither SC
2		Mohamed Rayen Rhimi	31 December 2005 (aged 20)	(Tunisian Football Federation) CA Bizertin
3		Youssef Herch	2 November 2005 (aged 20)	(Tunisian Football Federation) US Monastirienne
4		Mohamed Iyadh Riahi	21 December 2005 (aged 20)	(Tunisian Football Federation) Stade Tunisien
5		Mohamed Amine Allala	1 January 2005 (aged 21)	(Tunisian Football Federation) CA Bizertin
6		Haythem Dhaou	12 January 2005 (aged 21)	(Tunisian Football Federation) Espérance de Tunis
7		Zinedine Kada	1 August 2005 (aged 20)	(Tunisian Football Federation) US Ben Guerdane
8		Amanallah Maherzi	24 October 2005 (aged 20)	(Qatar Football Association) Al Bidda SC
9		Omar Ben Ali	22 April 2005 (aged 21)	(Tunisian Football Federation) CS Sfaxien
10		Mohamed Sadok Mahmoud	10 November 2005 (aged 20)	(Tunisian Football Federation) Club Africain
11		Dhirar Brik	13 October 2007 (aged 18)	(Italian Football Federation) FC Südtirol
12		Amine-Elias Gröller-Belouafa	25 October 2005 (aged 20)	(Austrian Football Association) Rapid Wien
13		Said Remadnia	27 March 2009 (aged 17)	(French Football Federation) Marseille
14		Fares Bousnina	13 February 2006 (aged 20)	(Italian Football Federation) Bologna
15		Joseph Taieb	6 August 2005 (aged 20)	(Austrian Football Association) FAC Wien
16		Moatez Hanzouli	7 September 2005 (aged 20)	(Tunisian Football Federation) CA Bizertin
17		Mohamed Rayane Anene	15 August 2006 (aged 19)	(Tunisian Football Federation) Etoile du Sahel
18		Nacim Dendani	30 April 2006 (aged 20)	(Monégasque Football Federation) Monaco
19		Louay Trayi	20 January 2005 (aged 21)	(United Arab Emirates Football Association) Al-Wahda SC
20		Zayon Chtai Telamio	14 October 2006 (aged 19)	(French Football Federation) Paris Saint-Germain
21		Walid Dhouib	1 August 2006 (aged 19)	(Lithuanian Football Federation) FK Sūduva
22		Rayane Besbes	4 August 2005 (aged 20)	(Tunisian Football Federation) US Monastirienne
23		Rayane Boukadida	23 January 2007 (aged 19)	(French Football Federation) Le Mans
24		Anis Doubal	29 October 2006 (aged 19)	(French Football Federation) Marseille
25		Selim Khadhraoui	27 September 2006 (aged 19)	(Tunisian Football Federation) Etoile du Sahel

== Group B ==
=== Canada ===
Head coach: (Canada) Andrew Olivieri

No.	Pos.	Player	Date of birth (age)	Club
1	GK	Nathaniel Abraham	23 April 2007 (aged 19)	(United States Soccer Federation) Louisville Cardinals
2	DF	Aleksandr Guboglo	20 March 2007 (aged 19)	(Canadian Soccer Association) CF Montreal
3	DF	Clovis Archange	1 July 2008 (aged 17)	(United States Soccer Federation) Orlando City
4	MF	Dylan Judelson	5 June 2008 (aged 17)	(United States Soccer Federation) Orlando City
5	DF	Kilian Michelbach	1 July 2008 (aged 17)	(German Football Association) Ingolstadt
6	DF	Felix Samson	26 October 2007 (aged 18)	(United States Soccer Federation) Cincinnati
7	FW	Shola Jimoh	8 April 2008 (aged 18)	(Canadian Soccer Association) Inter Toronto FC
8	MF	Emrick Fotsing	27 September 2007 (aged 18)	(Canadian Soccer Association) Vancouver FC
9	FW	Owen Graham-Roache	11 February 2008 (aged 18)	(Canadian Soccer Association) CF Montreal
10	MF	Liam Mackenzie	15 March 2007 (aged 19)	(Canadian Soccer Association) Vancouver Whitecaps
11	FW	Antoni Klukowski	2 April 2007 (aged 19)	(Polish Football Association) Polonia Warszawa
12	GK	Jonathan Ransom	8 January 2008 (aged 18)	(United States Soccer Federation) Atlanta United
13	DF	Max Vogele	27 March 2007 (aged 19)	(Swedish Football Association) IFK Stocksund
14	MF	Timothy Fortier	22 December 2008 (aged 17)	(Canadian Soccer Association) Toronto FC
15	FW	Evan Brown	9 June 2007 (aged 18)	(German Football Association) SSV Ulm 1846
16	DF	Sergei Kozlovskiy	18 June 2008 (aged 17)	(Canadian Soccer Association) Atlético Ottawa
17	DF	Sahil Deo	7 April 2008 (aged 18)	(Canadian Soccer Association) Vancouver Whitecaps
18	MF	Valter Sedin	28 February 2007 (aged 19)	(Swedish Football Association) Hammarby
19	FW	Marius Aiyenero	23 May 2008 (aged 18)	(United States Soccer Federation) LAFC
20	FW	Aiden Evans	1 November 2008 (aged 17)	(The Football Association) Fulham
21	GK	Izan Server	2 February 2007 (aged 19)	(Royal Spanish Football Federation) Celta Vigo
22	MF	Jesse Saputo	9 July 2007 (aged 18)	(Italian Football Federation) Bologna
23	DF	Elijah Roche	28 January 2008 (aged 18)	(Austrian Football Association) Sturm Graz
24	DF	Anyole Peter	18 June 2007 (aged 18)	(Canadian Soccer Association) Whitecaps FC Academy

=== Ivory Coast ===
Head coach: TBC

No.	Pos.	Player	Date of birth (age)	Club
1	GK	Yvann Konan	16 January 2007 (aged 19)	(French Football Federation) Lyon
2	DF	Goudousse Bamba	7 October 2005 (aged 20)	(Ivorian Football Federation) FC San Pédro
3	DF	Ismail Ramadan Diaby	9 November 2005 (aged 20)	(Ivorian Football Federation) CO Korhogo
4	MF	Emmanuel Kakou	30 June 2005 (aged 20)	(Royal Belgian Football Association) Cercle Bruges
5	DF	Mamadou Sidibe	12 November 2005 (aged 20)	(Ivorian Football Federation) SOA FC
6	MF	Abdoulaye Kanté	9 July 2005 (aged 20)	(French Football Federation) Saint-Etienne
7	FW	Malick Yalcouyé	18 November 2005 (aged 20)	(Football Association of Wales) Swansea
8	MF	Patrick Zabi	24 September 2006 (aged 19)	(French Football Federation) Reims
9	FW	Oumar Konate	5 May 2007 (aged 19)	(Ivorian Football Federation) SOL FC
10	MF	Jocelin Ta Bi	9 February 2005 (aged 21)	(The Football Association) Sunderland
11	FW	Jaures Loukou	15 June 2005 (aged 20)	(Moldovan Football Federation) Sheriff Tiraspol
12	GK	Christ Tape	2 March 2006 (aged 20)	(Ivorian Football Federation) CO Korhogo
13	DF	Rodolphe Ekou N'Guetta	14 May 2005 (aged 21)	(Latvian Football Federation) FK Liepaja
14	FW	Moussa Kone	25 August 2008 (aged 17)	(Ivorian Football Federation) FC San Pédro
15	MF	Mohamed Dao	2 February 2007 (aged 19)	(French Football Federation) Paris FC
16	GK	Zigui Yoro	1 January 2006 (aged 20)	(Ivorian Football Federation) Stella Club d'Adjamé
17	FW	Elie N'Gatta	15 February 2006 (aged 20)	(French Football Federation) Sochaux
18	DF	Dramane Kamagate	1 May 2005 (aged 21)	(Algerian Football Federation) USM Alger
19	MF	Eddy Doué	11 December 2005 (aged 20)	(Portuguese Football Federation) CF Estrela Amadora
20	FW	Luck Zogbé	24 March 2005 (aged 21)	(French Football Federation) Brest
21	DF	Eric Junior Simpore	8 October 2006 (aged 19)	(Ivorian Football Federation) SOA FC

=== Japan ===
Head coach: TBC

No.	Pos.	Player	Date of birth (age)	Club
1	GK	Hikaru Ogawa	24 June 2007 (aged 18)	(Japan Football Association) Sanfrecce Hiroshima
2	DF	Kanaru Matsumoto	19 January 2007 (aged 19)	(Japan Football Association) Shonan Bellmare
3	DF	Jui Hata	1 May 2007 (aged 19)	(Japan Football Association) Yokohama FC
4	MF	Harumu Kubo	18 June 2007 (aged 18)	(Japan Football Association) Nagoya Grampus
5	DF	Kei Murakami	11 April 2007 (aged 19)	(Japan Football Association) Yokohama F. Marinos
6	MF	Yuta Sugawara	7 September 2007 (aged 18)	(Japan Football Association) FC Tokyo
7	FW	Taito Kanda	7 May 2008 (aged 18)	(Japan Football Association) RB Omiya Ardija
8	MF	Ryosuke Iwasaki	30 January 2008 (aged 18)	(Japan Football Association) Yokohama FC
9	FW	Ritsu Onishi	29 May 2007 (aged 19)	(Japan Football Association) Waseda University
11	FW	Hiroto Asada	16 January 2008 (aged 18)	(Japan Football Association) Yokohama F. Marinos
12	GK	Pinto Amato Noguchi	18 April 2007 (aged 19)	(Japan Football Association) Tsukuba University
13	DF	Naru Nakatsumi	19 December 2007 (aged 18)	(Japan Football Association) Gamba Osaka
15	MF	Masato Araki	2 August 2007 (aged 18)	(Japan Football Association) Iwaki FC
16	MF	Matthew Edward	21 July 2008 (aged 17)	(Japan Football Association) RB Omiya Ardija
17	FW	Kaiki Kato	25 February 2008 (aged 18)	(Japan Football Association) Tsukuba University
18	MF	Taiga Nagai	19 November 2007 (aged 18)	(Japan Football Association) Vegalta Sendai
19	FW	Sunao Kidera	12 September 2008 (aged 17)	(Japan Football Association) RB Omiya Ardija
20	DF	Hajime Hidaka	13 November 2007 (aged 18)	(Japan Football Association) RB Omiya Ardija
21	FW	Jelani Mcghee	24 December 2008 (aged 17)	(Japan Football Association) RB Omiya Ardija
22	GK	Noriharu Kan	11 April 2007 (aged 19)	(Japan Football Association) Kawasaki Frontale
23	DF	Hiroto Matsuura	21 September 2008 (aged 17)	(Japan Football Association) Albirex Niigata

=== Portugal ===
Head coach: TBC

No.	Pos.	Player	Date of birth (age)	Club
0	GK	Tiago Andrade	21 October 2005 (aged 20)	(Portuguese Football Federation) Porto
0	MF	Flávio Gonçalves	30 May 2007 (aged 19)	(Portuguese Football Federation) Sporting CP
1	GK	Francisco Silva	20 November 2005 (aged 20)	(Portuguese Football Federation) Sporting CP
2	DF	José Silva	20 August 2005 (aged 20)	(Portuguese Football Federation) Arouca
3	DF	Miguel Alves	30 December 2005 (aged 20)	(Portuguese Football Federation) Sporting CP
4	DF	José Sampaio	4 January 2005 (aged 21)	(Portuguese Football Federation) Vizela
5	DF	Tiago Parente	12 June 2006 (aged 19)	(Portuguese Football Federation) Benfica
6	MF	Mathys De Carvalho	1 May 2005 (aged 21)	(French Football Federation) Lyon
7	FW	Mauro Couro	15 November 2005 (aged 20)	(Portuguese Football Federation) Sporting CP
8	MF	Manuel Mendonça	24 March 2005 (aged 21)	(Portuguese Football Federation) Sporting CP
9	FW	Rafael Nel	3 April 2005 (aged 21)	(Portuguese Football Federation) Sporting CP
10	MF	João Rego	20 June 2005 (aged 20)	(Portuguese Football Federation) Benfica
11	FW	Fabio Baldé	20 July 2005 (aged 20)	(German Football Association) Hamburg
12	GK	João Afonso	30 April 2007 (aged 19)	(Portuguese Football Federation) Santa Clara
13	DF	Gustavo Costa	15 September 2005 (aged 20)	(Portuguese Football Federation) Académico Viseu
14	MF	Luis Gomes	13 April 2005 (aged 21)	(Portuguese Football Federation) Porto
15	DF	Jonatas Noro	9 July 2005 (aged 20)	(Portuguese Football Federation) Braga
17	MF	Afonso Assis	15 May 2006 (aged 20)	(Portuguese Football Federation) Moreirense
19	FW	Tiago Freitas	17 August 2006 (aged 19)	(Portuguese Football Federation) Benfica
20	DF	Miguel Nogueira	25 February 2005 (aged 21)	(Portuguese Football Federation) Vitória SC
21	MF	Martim Ferreira	26 January 2006 (aged 20)	(Portuguese Football Federation) Benfica
22	DF	Diogo Fernandes	17 February 2005 (aged 21)	(Portuguese Football Federation) Porto
23	FW	Leandro Santos	28 September 2005 (aged 20)	(Portuguese Football Federation) Moreirense

=== Venezuela ===
Head coach: TBC

No.	Pos.	Player	Date of birth (age)	Club
1	GK	Diego Ochoa	11 February 2007 (aged 19)	(Venezuelan Football Federation) UCV FC
2	DF	Victor Fung	13 August 2007 (aged 18)	(United States Soccer Federation) Stanford University
3	DF	Ricardo Rincones	10 November 2008 (aged 17)	(Venezuelan Football Federation) Monagas
4	DF	Marcos Maitan	18 April 2008 (aged 18)	(Venezuelan Football Federation) Monagas
5	DF	John Mancilla	19 November 2008 (aged 17)	(Venezuelan Football Federation) Monagas
6	MF	Sebastian Hernandez	13 January 2007 (aged 19)	(Venezuelan Football Federation) UCV FC
7	FW	Santos Torrealba	2 May 2007 (aged 19)	(Venezuelan Football Federation) Zamora
9	MF	Marco Morigi	19 March 2007 (aged 19)	(United States Soccer Federation) New York Red Bulls II
9	FW	Diego Claut	3 January 2008 (aged 18)	(Venezuelan Football Federation) Deportivo Miranda
10	MF	Yerwin Sulbaran	3 March 2008 (aged 18)	(Austrian Football Association) RB Salzburg
11	FW	Charly Vegas	20 March 2007 (aged 19)	(Venezuelan Football Federation) Caracas
12	GK	Erickson Lira	15 June 2007 (aged 18)	(Venezuelan Football Federation) Caracas
13	DF	Roman Davis	8 January 2008 (aged 18)	(Venezuelan Football Federation) UCV FC
14	MF	Aytor Herrera	31 October 2007 (aged 18)	(Venezuelan Football Federation) Caracas
15	MF	Juan Uribe	18 April 2008 (aged 18)	(Venezuelan Football Federation) Caracas
16	FW	Gustavo Caraballo	29 August 2008 (aged 17)	(United States Soccer Federation) Orlando City
17	FW	Gustavo Lozano	25 May 2007 (aged 19)	(Venezuelan Football Federation) Deportivo Tachira
18	MF	Aquiles Zamora	3 March 2007 (aged 19)	(Mexican Football Federation) Necaxa
19	FW	Yimvert Berroterán	4 May 2008 (aged 18)	(Venezuelan Football Federation) UCV FC
20	DF	Henrry Diaz	3 March 2008 (aged 18)	(Venezuelan Football Federation) Monagas
21	GK	David Rodriguez	2 September 2008 (aged 17)	(Venezuelan Football Federation) Academia Puerto Caballo
22	MF	Alan Vazquez	10 May 2008 (aged 18)	(Venezuelan Football Federation) Metropolitanos
23	DF	Luis Carrero	14 March 2007 (aged 19)	(Football Association of Slovenia) Maribor
24	FW	José Rivas	3 May 2007 (aged 19)	(Brazilian Football Confederation) Barra FC
