= An Zhicheng =

Chinese footballer

Personal information
- Date of birth: 15 January 2007 (age 19)
- Place of birth: Yanji, Jilin, China
- Height: 1.87 m (6 ft 2 in)
- Position: Goalkeeper

Team information
- Current team: Changchun Yatai
- Number: 1

Youth career
- Changchun Yatai

Senior career*
Years	Team	Apps	(Gls)
2025–	Changchun Yatai	3	(0)

International career^{‡}
2025–	China U19	3	(0)
- * Club domestic league appearances and goals as of 9 July 2026 ‡ National team caps and goals as of 9 July 2026

An Zhicheng (simplified Chinese: 安智诚; traditional Chinese: 安智誠; pinyin: Ān Zhìchéng; born 15 January 2007) is a Chinese professional footballer who plays as a goalkeeper for China League One club Changchun Yatai.

== Early life and youth career ==
An Zhicheng was born on 15 January 2007 in Yanji, Jilin. He is a product of the Changchun Yatai youth academy.

In July 2022, An was selected for the Chinese Football Association's elite youth player training camp for the 2007 and 2008 age groups, organized from 20 to 26 July 2022 in the Northeast region. In September 2022, he was named among the Changchun Yatai players selected for the CFA national elite youth player training camp (2007 and 2008 age groups) held from 23 September to 4 October 2022.

== Club career ==
=== Changchun Yatai ===
On 18 February 2025, Changchun Yatai announced their squad for the 2025 Chinese Super League season, with An Zhicheng selected as part of the first-team roster. He was assigned the number 1 jersey, traditionally reserved for goalkeepers, and was registered as one of five U21 players in the B list, all products of the Changchun Yatai youth system. At 18 years old, he was the youngest player in the Changchun Yatai squad for the 2025 season.

An made his Chinese Super League debut on 27 September 2025, in a 2–2 home draw against Qingdao Hainiu in the 26th round of the 2025 season. He came on as a substitute in the 8th minute after starting goalkeeper Wang Zhifeng was sent off with a red card for fouling Lankelzé outside the penalty area. During the match, An made a key save in the 37th minute to deny Wellington Silva a clear goal-scoring opportunity.

On 19 October 2025, An made his first start for Changchun Yatai in a 0–2 away loss to Henan in the 27th round of the 2025 Chinese Super League. He completed three saves during the match.

On 22 November 2025, An started in the final match of the 2025 Chinese Super League season, a 0–1 away loss to Qingdao West Coast. He was one of five Changchun Yatai youth academy products in the starting lineup, alongside Xuan Zhijian, He Yiran, Wu Zhicheng, and Jing Boxi. Changchun Yatai finished the 2025 season in 16th place with 4 wins, 7 draws, and 19 losses, accumulating 19 points, and were relegated to China League One alongside Meizhou Hakka.

On 16 May 2026, An started for Changchun Yatai in the 2026 Chinese FA Cup third round match against Shanxi Chongde Ronghai. The match ended 1–1 after extra time, with Changchun Yatai losing 4–5 in the penalty shootout. During the penalty shootout, An saved two penalties, but teammates Jing Boxi, Muhamet, and Feng Zijun all failed to convert their spot-kicks.

For the 2026 season, An remained part of the Changchun Yatai first-team squad competing in China League One.

== International career ==
In August 2025, An was named in the China U18 national team training camp for the first phase of 2025, held from 18 August to 8 September 2025 at the National Football Training Base in Xianghe, Hebei, and Baotou, Inner Mongolia. He was selected as part of the second batch of 31 players, reporting on 28 August 2025.

In November 2025, An was selected for the China U18 national team third training camp of 2025, held from 2 to 7 December 2025 in Shanghai. The camp focused on physical fitness testing in preparation for the 2027 AFC U-20 Asian Cup.

In May 2026, An was named in the China U19 national team squad for training camp and the 52nd Maurice Revello Tournament (Toulon Tournament) in France, from 25 May to 15 June 2026. The camp was held in Shanghai and the Provence-Alpes-Côte d'Azur region of France.

On 31 March 2026, An started in goal for the China U19 national team in a 2–4 loss to Australia U19 in the second match of the 2026 CFA China Team Yiwu International Youth Football Invitational Tournament held at Yiwu Meihu Sports Center Stadium. He replaced Ihsen Ilham, who had started in the first match. In the 30th minute, An saved a low shot from Gabriel Tillo inside the penalty area.

== Career statistics ==
=== Club ===
As of 9 July 2026

Appearances and goals by club, season and competition
Club	Season	League			National Cup		Continental		Other		Total	
Club	Season	Division	Apps	Goals	Apps	Goals	Apps	Goals	Apps	Goals	Apps	Goals
Changchun Yatai	2025	Chinese Super League	3	0	0	0	—		—		3	0
Changchun Yatai	2026	China League One	0	0	1	0	—		—		1	0
Career total			3	0	1	0	0	0	0	0	4	0
