= Wang Xinyou =

Chinese footballer (born 2007)

Personal information
- Full name: 王镡幼
- Date of birth: 12 May 2007 (age 19)
- Place of birth: Shijiazhuang, Hebei, China
- Height: 1.79 m (5 ft 10 in)
- Positions: Forward; wide midfielder

Team information
- Current team: Guangdong Mingtu (on loan from Qingdao West Coast)
- Number: 17

Youth career
- Hebei China Fortune; Shandong Taishan

Senior career*
Years	Team	Apps	(Gls)
2026–	Qingdao West Coast	0	(0)
2026–	→ Guangdong Mingtu (loan)	11	(2)

International career^{‡}
2025–	China U19		
- * Club domestic league appearances and goals as of 25 September 2026 ‡ National team caps and goals as of 25 September 2026

Wang Xinyou (Chinese: 王镡幼; pinyin: Wáng Xīnyòu; born 12 May 2007) is a Chinese professional footballer who plays as a forward or midfielder for China League Two club Guangdong Mingtu, on loan from Chinese Super League club Qingdao West Coast.

== Early life and youth career ==
Wang Xinyou was born on 12 May 2007. He began his youth career at Hebei China Fortune's youth academy, and after the club dissolved, he joined Shandong Taishan's youth system. He attended the Shandong Luneng Taishan Football School. With Shandong Taishan U19, he won the China Youth Championship U19 title as a regular starter. His career honors also include two U19 Chinese Super League titles, a Three Big Ball championship, and a runner-up finish at the National Games.

== Club career ==
=== Qingdao West Coast ===
On 13 February 2026, Wang Xinyou joined Qingdao West Coast on a free transfer from Shandong Luneng Taishan Football School. The club officially announced his signing on 16 February 2026, alongside several other players. He did not make a competitive appearance for the club.

=== Guangdong Mingtu (loan) ===
On 27 June 2026, China League Two club Guangdong Mingtu announced the loan signing of Wang Xinyou from Qingdao West Coast, with the loan lasting until the end of the 2026 season. He made his debut for the club in a 0–0 draw against Guizhou Guiyang Athletic in round 13 of the league season. On 4 July 2026, he scored his first goal for Guangdong Mingtu in a 2–1 away win against Guangzhou Dandelion, opening the scoring in the 2nd minute.

== International career ==
On 7 September 2025, Wang Xinyou scored in a 4–0 friendly win for the China U18 team against Myanmar U18.

== Career statistics ==
=== Club ===
As of 25 September 2026

Appearances and goals by club, season and competition
Club	Season	League			National Cup		Continental		Other		Total	
Club	Season	Division	Apps	Goals	Apps	Goals	Apps	Goals	Apps	Goals	Apps	Goals
Qingdao West Coast	2026	Chinese Super League	0	0	0	0	—		—		0	0
Guangdong Mingtu (loan)	2026	China League Two	11	2	0	0	—		—		11	2
Career total			11	2	0	0	0	0	0	0	11	2

== Honours ==
Shandong Taishan U19

- China Youth Championship U19: 2025
- U19 Chinese Super League: 2 titles

Individual

- Three Big Ball Championship
- National Games runner-up: 2025
