= Li Hao (footballer, born 2004) =

Chinese footballer

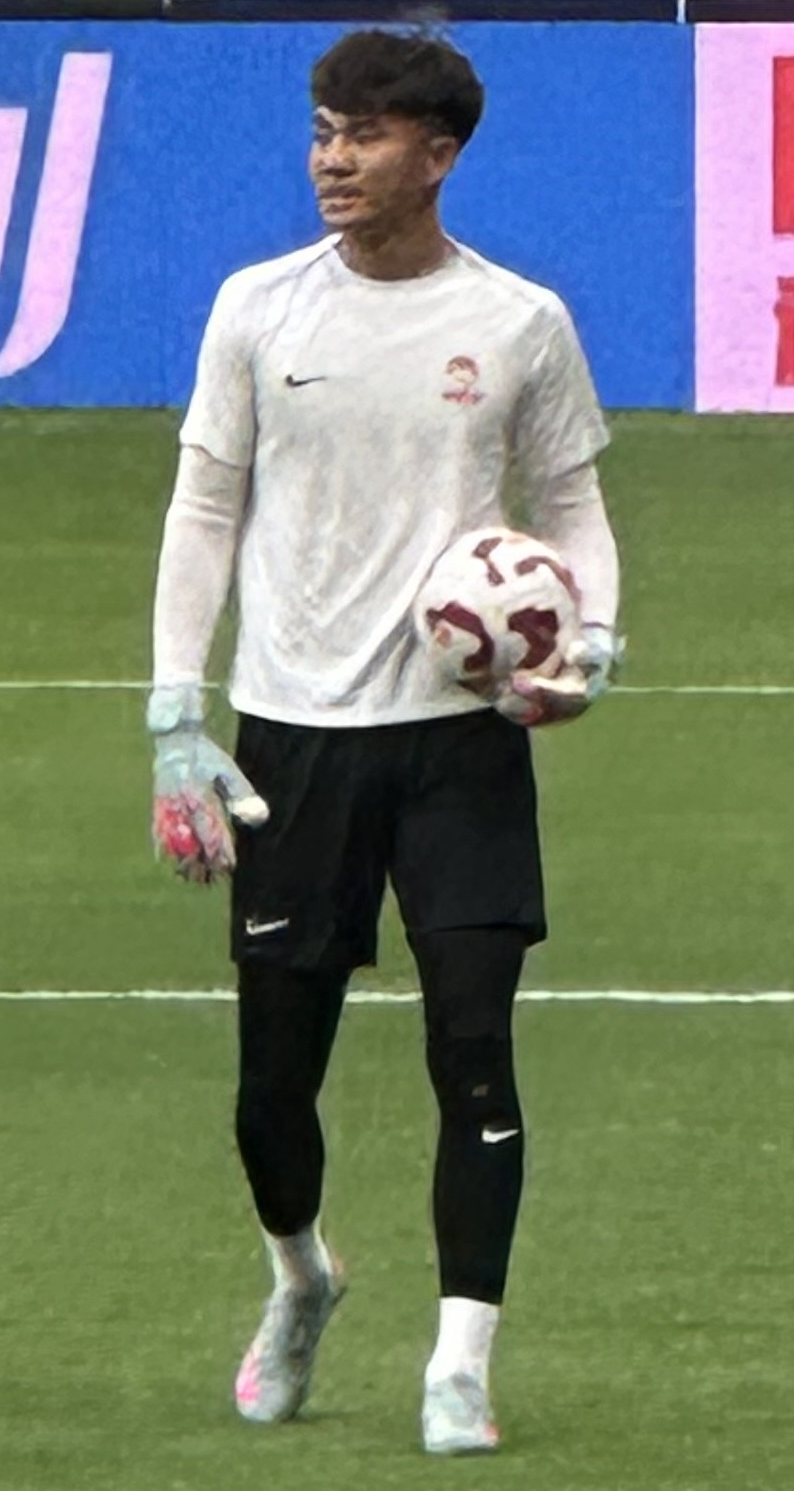
- Li Hao in 2025

Personal information
- Full name: Li Hao
- Date of birth: 6 March 2004 (age 22)
- Place of birth: Nanyang, Henan, China
- Height: 1.88 m (6 ft 2 in)
- Position: Goalkeeper

Team information
- Current team: Qingdao West Coast
- Number: 16

Youth career
- Atlético Madrid
- Beijing Wanda
- Meizhou Hakka
- 2020: Dalian Pro
- 2023–2024: Atlético Madrid

Senior career*
Years	Team	Apps	(Gls)
2023–2024	Atlético Madrid B	0	(0)
2024	→ Cornellà (loan)	2	(0)
2024–2025	Cornellà	2	(0)
2025–	Qingdao West Coast	56	(0)

International career
–2021	China U17		
2022–2023	China U20	8	(0)
2024–2026	China U23	19	(0)
2026–	China	3	(0)
Medal record
Representing China
AFC U-23 Asian Cup
Runner-up	2026 Saudi Arabia	Team
Asian Games
Bronze medal – third place	2026 Aichi–Nagoya	Team
- * Club domestic league appearances and goals as of 19 November 2026

Li Hao (Chinese: 李昊; born 6 March 2004) is a Chinese footballer who plays as a goalkeeper for Chinese Super League club Qingdao West Coast and the China national team.

== Club career ==
Li was selected as one of fifty young Chinese footballers to join the academy of Spanish side Atlético Madrid, as part of Wanda Group's "China Football Hope Star" initiative to encourage the development of young Chinese footballers.

On his return to China, he remained with the Wanda Group, playing for the company's football team, Beijing Wanda. In 2021, he represented the China national under-20 football team in the China League Two, notably producing an impressive performance in the Chinese FA Cup, despite his team losing 2–1 to Dalian Professional.

In February 2023, he returned to Atlético Madrid, joining their academy and becoming the second Chinese player to sign an official contract with the club after Xu Xin.

== International career ==
Li has represented China from under-15 to under-22 level.

He gained attention in the 2023 AFC U-20 Asian Cup, having produced outstanding performances as China reached the quarter-finals, including a shock win over Saudi Arabia at the group stage. Despite China falling to South Korea in extra-time of the quarter-finals, Li Hao was praised for his performances throughout the tournament.

Li made his China debut in a 2-1 friendly victory over Singapore at the Jalan Besar Stadium on 5 June 2026.

== Career statistics ==
=== Club ===
As of 25 February 2023.

Appearances and goals by club, season and competition
Club	Season	League			Cup		Continental		Other		Total	
Club	Season	Division	Apps	Goals	Apps	Goals	Apps	Goals	Apps	Goals	Apps	Goals
China U20	2021	China League Two	6	0	1 (Note: Appearances in the Chinese FA Cup)	0	0	0	0	0	7	0
Career total			6	0	1	0	0	0	0	0	7	0

== Honours ==
China U23

- AFC U-23 Asian Cup runner-up: 2026
