= 2019 Torneo di Viareggio =

2019 Viareggio Cup World Football Tournament Coppa Carnevale
71° Torneo di Viareggio

Tournament details
- Host country: Italy
- City: Viareggio
- Dates: 11 March 2019 – 27 March 2019
- Teams: 40

The 2019 Torneo di Viareggio is the 71st edition of Torneo di Viareggio, an annual youth football tournament held in Viareggio, Tuscany.

== Format ==
The 40 teams are seeded in 10 groups, 5 groups in pool A and 5 groups in pool B. Each team from a group meets the others in a single tie. The winning club from each group and six best runners-up progress to the knockout stage. All matches in the final rounds are single tie. During the round of 16 no extra time will be played in case of a draw, with the match proceeding immediately to penalty kicks. From the quarterfinals on, matches include 30 minutes extra time and penalties to be played if the draw between teams still holds.

== Participating teams ==
40 teams participate in the tournament. The list of the teams are below.

Italian teams

- (Italy) Ascoli
- (Italy) Benevento
- (Italy) Bologna
- (Italy) Cagliari
- (Italy) Carrarese
- (Italy) Empoli
- (Italy) Fiorentina
- (Italy) Genoa
- (Italy) Inter Milan
- (Italy) Livorno
- (Italy) Milan
- (Italy) Parma
- (Italy) Perugia
- (Italy) Pontedera
- (Italy) Rieti
- (Italy) Salernitana
- (Italy) Sassuolo
- (Italy) Serie D Representatives
- (Italy) SPAL
- (Italy) Spezia
- (Italy) Ternana
- (Italy) Torino
- (Italy) Venezia
- (Italy) Viareggio

European teams

- (Belgium) Club Brugge
- (Czech Republic) Dukla Prague
- (Denmark) Nordsjælland
- (Georgia (country)) Norchi Dinamo
- (Latvia) FK RFS
- (Portugal) Braga
- (Russia) Krasnodar

American teams

- (Brazil) Athletico Paranaense
- (Paraguay) Atlántida Juniors
- (United States) LIAC New York
- (United States) UYSS New York
- (United States) Westchester United

African teams

- (Ghana) Berekum Chelsea
- (Ghana) Nania

Asian/Oceanian teams

- (Australia) APIA Leichhardt Tigers
- China U-19

== Group stage ==
=== Pool A ===
==== Group 1 ====
| Team | Pld | W | D | L | GF | GA | GD | Pts |
|---|---|---|---|---|---|---|---|---|
| (Portugal) Braga | 3 | 2 | 1 | 0 | 6 | 1 | +5 | 7 |
| (Italy) Inter Milan | 3 | 2 | 1 | 0 | 5 | 2 | +3 | 7 |
| (Italy) Cagliari | 3 | 1 | 0 | 2 | 2 | 3 | −1 | 3 |
| (Australia) APIA Leichhardt Tigers | 3 | 0 | 0 | 3 | 1 | 8 | −7 | 0 |

==== Group 2 ====
| Team | Pld | W | D | L | GF | GA | GD | Pts |
|---|---|---|---|---|---|---|---|---|
| (Italy) Empoli | 3 | 1 | 2 | 0 | 6 | 3 | +3 | 5 |
| (Denmark) Nordsjælland | 3 | 1 | 1 | 1 | 9 | 6 | +3 | 4 |
| (Italy) Ascoli | 3 | 1 | 1 | 1 | 4 | 5 | −1 | 4 |
| (United States) UYSS New York | 3 | 1 | 0 | 2 | 2 | 7 | −5 | 3 |

==== Group 3 ====
| Team | Pld | W | D | L | GF | GA | GD | Pts |
|---|---|---|---|---|---|---|---|---|
| (Italy) Bologna | 3 | 3 | 0 | 0 | 7 | 2 | +5 | 9 |
| (Belgium) Club Brugge | 3 | 2 | 0 | 1 | 11 | 4 | +7 | 6 |
| (Italy) Viareggio | 3 | 1 | 0 | 2 | 3 | 11 | −8 | 3 |
| (Italy) Ternana | 3 | 0 | 0 | 3 | 3 | 7 | −4 | 0 |

==== Group 4 ====
| Team | Pld | W | D | L | GF | GA | GD | Pts |
|---|---|---|---|---|---|---|---|---|
| (Brazil) Athletico Paranaense | 3 | 3 | 0 | 0 | 9 | 3 | +6 | 9 |
| (Italy) Torino | 3 | 2 | 0 | 1 | 11 | 3 | +8 | 6 |
| (Italy) Rieti | 3 | 1 | 0 | 2 | 6 | 7 | −1 | 3 |
| (Georgia (country)) Norchi Dinamo | 3 | 0 | 0 | 3 | 3 | 16 | −13 | 0 |

==== Group 5 ====
| Team | Pld | W | D | L | GF | GA | GD | Pts |
|---|---|---|---|---|---|---|---|---|
| (Italy) Parma | 3 | 3 | 0 | 0 | 9 | 1 | +8 | 9 |
| (Italy) Venezia | 3 | 2 | 0 | 1 | 9 | 4 | +5 | 6 |
| (Ghana) Nania | 3 | 1 | 0 | 2 | 4 | 5 | −1 | 3 |
| (United States) LIAC New York | 3 | 0 | 0 | 3 | 1 | 13 | −12 | 0 |

=== Pool B ===
==== Group 6 ====
| Team | Pld | W | D | L | GF | GA | GD | Pts |
|---|---|---|---|---|---|---|---|---|
| (Italy) Sassuolo | 3 | 2 | 0 | 1 | 7 | 1 | +6 | 6 |
| (Latvia) FK RFS | 3 | 2 | 0 | 1 | 5 | 3 | +2 | 6 |
| (Italy) Benevento | 3 | 1 | 1 | 1 | 1 | 1 | +0 | 4 |
| (Italy) Pontedera | 3 | 0 | 1 | 2 | 2 | 10 | −8 | 1 |

==== Group 7 ====
| Team | Pld | W | D | L | GF | GA | GD | Pts |
|---|---|---|---|---|---|---|---|---|
| (Italy) Milan | 3 | 3 | 0 | 0 | 7 | 2 | +5 | 9 |
| (Ghana) Berekum Chelsea | 3 | 2 | 0 | 1 | 5 | 2 | +3 | 6 |
| (Italy) Spezia | 3 | 1 | 0 | 2 | 4 | 5 | −1 | 3 |
| (Italy) Carrarese | 3 | 0 | 0 | 3 | 2 | 9 | −7 | 0 |

==== Group 8 ====
| Team | Pld | W | D | L | GF | GA | GD | Pts |
|---|---|---|---|---|---|---|---|---|
| (Italy) Fiorentina | 3 | 2 | 1 | 0 | 7 | 2 | +3 | 7 |
| (Italy) Perugia | 3 | 2 | 0 | 1 | 4 | 4 | +0 | 6 |
| (Russia) Krasnodar | 3 | 1 | 1 | 1 | 9 | 5 | +4 | 4 |
| (United States) Westchester United | 3 | 0 | 0 | 3 | 2 | 1 | -19 | 0 |

==== Group 9 ====
| Team | Pld | W | D | L | GF | GA | GD | Pts |
|---|---|---|---|---|---|---|---|---|
| (Italy) Genoa | 3 | 2 | 1 | 0 | 5 | 3 | +2 | 7 |
| (Czech Republic) Dukla Prague | 3 | 2 | 0 | 1 | 7 | 4 | +3 | 6 |
| (Italy) Livorno | 3 | 1 | 0 | 2 | 3 | 5 | −2 | 3 |
| (Paraguay) Atlántida Juniors | 3 | 0 | 1 | 2 | 2 | 5 | −3 | 1 |

==== Group 10 ====
| Team | Pld | W | D | L | GF | GA | GD | Pts |
|---|---|---|---|---|---|---|---|---|
| (Italy) Serie D Representatives | 3 | 2 | 1 | 0 | 5 | 1 | +4 | 7 |
| (Italy) SPAL | 3 | 2 | 0 | 1 | 4 | 2 | +2 | 6 |
| China U-19 | 3 | 1 | 1 | 1 | 2 | 4 | −2 | 2 |
| (Italy) Salernitana | 3 | 0 | 1 | 2 | 1 | 5 | −4 | 1 |

== Knockout stage ==
Round of 16
19 March
(Italy) Serie D Representatives | 0
(Italy) Inter Milan | 2
19 March
(Italy) Milan | 2 (2)
(Belgium) Club Brugge | 2 (4)
19 March
(Italy) Bologna | 2
(Czech Republic) Dukla Prague | 0
19 March
(Portugal) Braga | 1 (4)
(Italy) Sassuolo | 1 (2)
19 March
(Italy) Genoa | 1
(Italy) Empoli | 0
19 March
(Brazil) Athletico Paranaense | 1 (6)
(Ghana) Berekum Chelsea | 1 (7)
19 March
(Italy) Parma | 2 (4)
(Latvia) FK RFS | 2 (2)
19 March
(Italy) Fiorentina | 4
(Italy) Torino | 2

Quarter-finals
22 March
(Italy) Inter Milan | 0
(Belgium) Club Brugge | 3
22 March
(Italy) Bologna | 1
(Portugal) Braga | 0
22 March
(Italy) Genoa | 1 (4)
(Ghana) Berekum Chelsea | 1 (2)
22 March
(Italy) Parma | 4
(Italy) Fiorentina | 1

Semi-finals
25 March
(Belgium) Club Brugge | 1 (5)
(Italy) Bologna | 1 (6)
25 March
(Italy) Genoa | 3
(Italy) Parma | 2

Final
27 March
(Italy) Bologna | 1 (6)
(Italy) Genoa | 1 (5)
