= Peng Ziming =

Chinese footballer

Personal information
- Full name: 彭子鸣
- Date of birth: 12 November 2008 (age 18)
- Place of birth: Taizhou, Jiangsu, China
- Position: Forward

Team information
- Current team: Shanghai Port B
- Number: 88

Youth career
- Shanghai Genbao

Senior career*
| Years | Team | Apps | (Gls) |
| 2026– | Shanghai Port B | 0 | (0) |

International career^{‡}
| 2024–2025 | China U17 | | |
| 2026– | China U19 | | |
- * Club domestic league appearances and goals as of 30 September 2026 ‡ National team caps and goals as of 30 September 2026

Peng Ziming (simplified Chinese: 彭子鸣; traditional Chinese: 彭子鳴; pinyin: Péng Zǐmíng; born 12 November 2008) is a Chinese professional footballer who plays as a forward for Chinese Football Association club Shanghai Port B and U20 team. in China League Two and Chinese Youth Football League (U20 group).

== Early life and youth career ==
Peng Ziming was born on 12 November 2008. He was a player in the 2008 age group at the Shanghai Genbao Football Base.

On 16 December 2023, Peng scored a hat-trick in a 4–1 friendly win for Shanghai Genbao's 07/08 team against the China U15 elite team.

== Club career ==
=== Shanghai Port U20 ===
On 25 February 2026, Peng moved from the Genbao training base to Shanghai Port U20 on a free transfer.

In the 2026 season, Peng played for Shanghai Port U20 in the Chinese Youth Football League (U20 group). On 22 May 2026, he scored two goals in a 3–0 win against Qingdao Red Lions U20. On 22 June 2026, he scored in a 3–3 draw against Hubei Istar U20. On 16 August 2026, he provided an assist and scored the winning goal in a 2–1 away victory over Beijing Guoan U20.

== International career ==
In November 2024, Peng was called up to the China U16 national team for a training camp held from 1 to 12 December 2024 at the Haigeng base in Kunming, as preparation for the 2025 U17 Asian Cup.

In February 2025, Peng was named in the China U17 training squad for the 2025 U17 Asian Cup, with the team gathering on 6 March 2025 in Foshan, Guangdong, before traveling to the United Arab Emirates and Saudi Arabia for training and the tournament.

In March 2025, Peng was among three players who did not make the final 23-man squad for the 2025 U17 Asian Cup but remained with the team in Saudi Arabia and continued to train with the squad.

In September 2026, Peng was called up to the China U19 national team for the fourth training camp of the year, held from 20 September to 5 October 2026 at the National Football Training Base, as preparation for the 2027 U20 Asian Cup.

== Career statistics ==
=== Club ===
As of 30 September 2026

Appearances and goals by club, season and competition
| Club | Season | League | | | National Cup | | Continental | | Other | | Total | |
| Club | Season | Division | Apps | Goals | Apps | Goals | Apps | Goals | Apps | Goals | Apps | Goals |
|---|---|---|---|---|---|---|---|---|---|---|---|---|
| Shanghai Port B | 2026 | China League Two | 0 | 0 | 0 | 0 | — | | — | | 0 | 0 |
| Shanghai Port U20 | 2026 | U20 League | 0 | 0 | 0 | 0 | — | | — | | 0 | 0 |
| Career total | | | 0 | 0 | 0 | 0 | 0 | 0 | 0 | 0 | 0 | 0 |
