= Wu Zhicheng =

Chinese footballer (born 2007)

Personal information
- Date of birth: 15 September 2007 (age 19)
- Height: 1.83 m (6 ft 0 in)
- Position: Midfielder

Team information
- Current team: Changchun Yatai
- Number: 8

Youth career
- Changchun Yatai

Senior career*
Years	Team	Apps	(Gls)
2025–	Changchun Yatai	10	(0)

International career^{‡}
2025	China U20	3	(0)
- * Club domestic league appearances and goals as of 10 July 2026 ‡ National team caps and goals as of 10 July 2026

Wu Zhicheng (Chinese: 武之程; pinyin: Wǔ Zhīchéng; born 15 September 2007) is a Chinese professional footballer who plays as a midfielder for China League One club Changchun Yatai.

== Early life and youth career ==
Wu was born on 15 September 2007. In July 2021, he was selected for the Chinese Football Association's elite youth player training camp for the 2007 and 2008 age groups.

== Club career ==
=== Changchun Yatai youth ===
In October 2021, Wu represented Changchun Yatai U13 in the finals of the China Youth Football League. On 8 October, in the final round of the U13 group stage, Changchun Yatai U13 defeated Nanjing University of Technology Affiliated Middle School U13 9–0, with Wu scoring a hat-trick. Wu scored 8 goals in total during the group stage, making him the top scorer of the tournament at that stage.

In 2024, Wu represented Changchun Yatai U21 in the U21 League. In June 2024, Changchun Yatai U21 added Wu to their squad for the final stage of the 2024 U21 League. In December 2024, in a U21 League final stage match against Meizhou Hakka, Wu scored twice to help Changchun Yatai win 3–2.

=== Changchun Yatai ===
On 10 July 2025, Wu was promoted to the Changchun Yatai first team by head coach Ricardo Soares. He was assigned the number 80 jersey.

On 27 July 2025, Wu made his Chinese Super League debut as a substitute in the second half in round 18 of the 2025 Chinese Super League season.

In the 2025 season, Wu also represented Taizhou Team in the Jiangsu Football City League. On 1 November 2025, in the final of the 2025 Jiangsu Provincial City Football League, Taizhou Team defeated Nantong Team in a penalty shoot-out to win the championship.

On 12 March 2026, Changchun Yatai officially announced their first-team squad for the 2026 season, with Wu assigned the number 8 jersey.

== International career ==
In August 2025, Wu was called up to the China U18 national team for a selection training camp.

== Career statistics ==
=== Club ===
As of 10 July 2026

Appearances and goals by club, season and competition
Club	Season	League			National Cup		Continental		Other		Total	
Club	Season	Division	Apps	Goals	Apps	Goals	Apps	Goals	Apps	Goals	Apps	Goals
Changchun Yatai	2025	Chinese Super League	2	0	0	0	—		—		2	0
Changchun Yatai	2026	China League One	8	0	0	0	—		—		8	0
Career total			10	0	0	0	0	0	0	0	10	0

== Honours ==
Taizhou Team

- Jiangsu Provincial City Football League: 2025
