= Jia Weiwei =

Chinese footballer (born 2007)

Personal information
- Date of birth: 22 February 2007 (age 19)
- Place of birth: Liaocheng, Shandong, China
- Height: 1.88 m (6 ft 2 in)
- Position: Centre-forward

Team information
- Current team: Qingdao West Coast
- Number: 29

Youth career
- 2019–2023: Heze Caozhou Martial Arts School
- 2024–2025: Shandong Taishan

Senior career*
Years	Team	Apps	(Gls)
2026–	Qingdao West Coast	11	(0)

International career^{‡}
2025–	China U19		
- * Club domestic league appearances and goals as of 19 November 2026 ‡ National team caps and goals as of 28 June 2026

Jia Weiwei (simplified Chinese: 贾伟伟; traditional Chinese: 賈偉偉; pinyin: Jiǎ Wěiwěi; born 22 February 2007) is a Chinese professional footballer who plays as a centre-forward for Chinese Super League club Qingdao West Coast.

== Early life and youth career ==
Jia was born on 22 February 2007 in Liaocheng, Shandong. He began playing football while attending primary school in Liaocheng. In 2019, he entered Heze Caozhou Martial Arts School to receive systematic "martial arts + football" training.

At Caozhou Martial Arts School, Jia won the 2019 National Youth Super League (U13) North China Division championship, consecutive Heze "Mayor's Cup" campus football league titles, and the 2020 National Sports School Cup football tournament third place, personally receiving the "Football Future Star" title. In December 2023, he entered the Shandong men's football team. In August 2024, he joined Shandong Taishan. With Taishan, he won the 2024 Third China Youth Football League (U19 Group) national championship. He also helped Shandong win the 2024 First National Youth Three Major Ball Games football championship.

== Club career ==
=== Shandong Taishan ===
Jia played for Shandong Taishan's youth teams from 2024 to 2026. In October 2025, he helped Shandong U18 reach the final of the National Games U18 football competition, where they lost to Liaoning U18 in a penalty shootout and finished as runners-up.

=== Qingdao West Coast ===
On 14 February 2026, Qingdao West Coast officially announced the signing of Jia Weiwei from Shandong Taishan as a free agent. The club formally unveiled him as part of an eight-player signing announcement on 16 February 2026. He made his Chinese Super League debut as a substitute in the 2026 season. As of 1 June 2026, he had made nine league appearances, all as a substitute, with an average playing time of seven minutes per match.

== International career ==
In November 2025, Jia was called up to the China U18 national team and scored in a 2–1 friendly victory over Kyrgyzstan U18 on 15 November. In early 2026, he was called up to the China U19 national team. On 5 February 2026, he scored the only goal in a 1–0 friendly victory over Uzbekistan U19 in the 7th minute. On 9 February 2026, he played in a 1–1 draw against Uzbekistan U19. In May 2026, Jia was again called up to the China U19 national team alongside Qingdao West Coast teammates Wang Gengrui and Yang Zhanpeng.

== Career statistics ==
=== Club ===
As of 1 June 2026

Appearances and goals by club, season and competition
Club	Season	League			National Cup		Continental		Other		Total	
Club	Season	Division	Apps	Goals	Apps	Goals	Apps	Goals	Apps	Goals	Apps	Goals
Qingdao West Coast	2026	Chinese Super League	9	0	0	0	—		—		9	0
Career total			9	0	0	0	0	0	0	0	9	0

== Honours ==
Shandong Taishan U19

- China Youth Football League (U19): 2024

Shandong U18

- National Youth Three Major Ball Games football: 2024
- National Games of China U18 football: 2025 (runner-up)
