= Alexander Xie =

Chinese association footballer

Personal information
- Full name: Alexander Chujun Xie
- Date of birth: 5 May 2007 (age 19)
- Place of birth: Melbourne, Australia
- Height: 1.80 m (5 ft 11 in)
- Position: Midfielder

Team information
- Current team: Qingdao West Coast
- Number: 31

Youth career
- 2024–2026: VfB Stuttgart

Senior career*
Years	Team	Apps	(Gls)
2026–	Qingdao West Coast	4	(0)

International career^{‡}
2025–	China U19	4	(0)
- * Club domestic league appearances and goals as of 19 November 2026 ‡ National team caps and goals as of 21 October 2026

Alexander Chujun Xie, also known in China as Xie Chujun (Chinese: 谢初筠; pinyin: Xiè Chūjūn; born 5 May 2007) is a Chinese professional footballer who plays as a midfielder for Chinese Super League club Qingdao West Coast.

== Early and personal life ==
Xie was born on 5 May 2007 in Australia, to Chinese-born parents from Shanghai and Shandong. He moved to Germany with his parents at age 11. He grew up in the youth system of FSV Frankfurt before joining VfB Stuttgart in August 2024.

Born in Australia, Xie grew up there until the age of 11, when he moved to Germany with his family. He is fluent in English, German, and Mandarin Chinese.

== Club career ==
=== VfB Stuttgart U19 ===
In August 2024, Xie signed a two-year contract with VfB Stuttgart. During the 2025–26 season, he made 23 league appearances for Stuttgart U19, scoring 2 assists, and was part of the squad that won the German Youth Cup. On 3 June 2026, Stuttgart officially announced that Xie would leave the club upon the expiration of his contract on 30 June 2026.

=== Qingdao West Coast ===
On 9 July 2026, Qingdao West Coast officially announced the signing of Xie. He made his Chinese Super League debut on 2 August 2026, coming on as a late substitute in the Qingdao derby against Qingdao Hainiu. As of 15 October 2026, he had made two substitute appearances in the league, accumulating 11 minutes of playing time.

== International career ==
In November 2025, Xie was called up to the China U18 training squad. In May 2026, he was named in the China U19 squad for the Maurice Revello Tournament. On 31 May 2026, he started and played 85 minutes in China U19's 1–0 victory over Saudi Arabia U21 in the opening match, and was named player of the match. In September 2026, he was again called up to the China U19 squad for a training camp ahead of the 2027 U20 Asian Cup.

== Career statistics ==
=== Club ===
As of 15 October 2026

Appearances and goals by club, season and competition
Club	Season	League			National Cup		Continental		Other		Total	
Club	Season	Division	Apps	Goals	Apps	Goals	Apps	Goals	Apps	Goals	Apps	Goals
Qingdao West Coast	2026	Chinese Super League	2	0	0	0	—		—		2	0
Career total			2	0	0	0	0	0	0	0	2	0

== Honours ==
VfB Stuttgart U19

- German Youth Cup: 2026
