= Fan Mengtong =

Chinese footballer

Personal information
- Date of birth: 21 March 2007 (age 19)
- Place of birth: Baoding, Hebei, China
- Height: 1.90 m (6 ft 3 in)
- Position: Goalkeeper

Team information
- Current team: Guangzhou Dandelion
- Number: 51

Senior career*
Years	Team	Apps	(Gls)
2025–	Guangzhou Dandelion	30	(0)

International career^{‡}
2025–	China U19	1	(0)
- * Club domestic league appearances and goals as of 23 July 2026 ‡ National team caps and goals as of 23 July 2026

Fan Mengtong (simplified Chinese: 范梦桐; traditional Chinese: 范夢桐; pinyin: Fàn Mèngtóng; born 21 March 2007) is a Chinese professional footballer who plays as a goalkeeper for China League Two club Guangzhou Dandelion.

== Club career ==
=== Guangzhou Dandelion ===
On 23 January 2025, Guangzhou Dandelion Football Club announced a cooperation agreement with Qingyuan Football School, with Qingyuan Football School's 2007 age group players to join the club. Fan was among the Qingyuan Football School 2007 age group players who joined Guangzhou Dandelion.

In March 2025, Guangzhou Dandelion announced its squad list for the 2025 season, with Fan assigned the number 51 jersey.

In August 2025, Fan made 12 appearances with 7 goals conceded and 6 clean sheets in the first phase of the 2025 season. During the 2026 season, he made 17 appearances with 14 starts.

== International career ==
In August 2025, Fan was called up to the China U18 national team for a training camp in preparation for the U20 Asian Cup qualifiers training camp. In January 2026, he was called up to the China U19 national team for a training camp in Zhaoqing, Guangdong, from 12 January to 9 February 2026, in preparation for the 2027 U20 Asian Cup. In May 2026, he was called up to the China U19 national team for a training camp in Shanghai and France from 25 May to 15 June 2026, to participate in the 52nd Maurice Revello Tournament (Toulon Tournament). He arrived at the team one day before departure for France.

== Career statistics ==
=== Club ===
As of 2026 season

Appearances and goals by club, season and competition
Club	Season	League			National Cup		Continental		Other		Total	
Club	Season	Division	Apps	Goals	Apps	Goals	Apps	Goals	Apps	Goals	Apps	Goals
Guangzhou Dandelion	2025	China League Two	14	0	0	0	—		—		14	0
Guangzhou Dandelion	2026	China League Two	16	0	0	0	—		—		16	0
Career total			30	0	0	0	0	0	0	0	30	0
