= Marco Morigi =

Venezuelan footballer (born 2007)

Personal information
- Full name: Marco Antonio Morigi Gudiño
- Date of birth: 19 March 2007 (age 19)
- Height: 1.81 m (5 ft 11 in)
- Position: Midfielder

Team information
- Current team: New York Red Bulls II (on loan from Caracas)
- Number: 42

Youth career
- Deportivo Lara
- Caracas

Senior career*
Years	Team	Apps	(Gls)
2024–	Caracas	7	(0)
2026–	→ New York Red Bulls II (loan)	6	(0)

International career^{‡}
2026–	Venezuela U20	1	(0)
- * Club domestic league appearances and goals as of 20:28, 15 November 2026 (UTC) ‡ National team caps and goals as of 16:53, 2 June 2026 (UTC)

Marco Antonio Morigi Gudiño (born 19 March 2007) is a Venezuelan professional footballer who plays as a midfielder for MLS Next Pro club New York Red Bulls II, on loan from Caracas.

== Career ==
Having begun his career with Deportivo Lara, Morigi would go on to debut with Caracas in the 2024 edition of the Venezuelan Primera División against Universidad Central. In July 2025, he was invited by German Bundesliga club Bayern Munich to be part of their World Squad initiative, representing the club in international friendlies. He scored twice against Chinese opposition Zhejiang Professional's under-21 side, before following this up with two more goals against Bayern Munich's under-19 team in the World Squad's final game.

On 19 March 2026, Morigi signed on a one-year loan deal with New York Red Bulls II.

== International career ==
Morigi was called up to the Venezuela national under-20 football team ahead of the 2026 Maurice Revello Tournament.

== Career statistics ==
As of match played 23 August 2026

Appearances and goals by club, season and competition
Club	Season	League			National cup (Note: Includes Copa Venezuela)		Continental		Other		Total	
Club	Season	Division	Apps	Goals	Apps	Goals	Apps	Goals	Apps	Goals	Apps	Goals
Caracas	2024	Venezuelan Primera División	4	0	0	0	0	0	0	0	4	0
Caracas	2025	Venezuelan Primera División	3	0	6	0	1 (Note: Appearance in Copa Sudamericana)	0	0	0	8	0
Caracas	Total		7	0	6	0	1	0	0	0	14	0
New York Red Bulls II (loan)	2026	MLS Next Pro	6	0	—		—		—		6	0
Career total			13	0	6	0	1	0	0	0	20	0
