= Chen Zihan (footballer) =

Chinese footballer

Personal information
- Date of birth: 21 March 2007 (age 19)
- Place of birth: Weifang, Shandong, China
- Height: 1.75 m (5 ft 9 in)
- Position: Defender

Team information
- Current team: Shandong Taishan B
- Number: 46

Youth career
- 2016–2018: Weifang Dongjun
- 2018–2019: Weifang Sports School
- 2019–: Luneng Taishan Football School

Senior career*
Years	Team	Apps	(Gls)
2026–	Shandong Taishan B	7	(0)

International career^{‡}
2026–	China U19	2	(0)
- * Club domestic league appearances and goals as of 8 July 2026 ‡ National team caps and goals as of 8 July 2026

Chen Zihan (simplified Chinese: 陈子涵; traditional Chinese: 陳子涵; pinyin: Chén Zǐhán; born 21 March 2007) is a Chinese professional footballer who plays as a defender for China League Two club Shandong Taishan B.

== Early life and youth career ==
Chen was born on 21 March 2007 in Weifang, Shandong. In 2016, he began systematic football training at Weifang Dongjun Football Club. In 2018, he entered the Weifang Sports School men's football team, and in 2019 he joined the Luneng Taishan Football School youth system. In 2022, he represented Weifang at the 25th Shandong Provincial Games. In 2024, he represented Shandong at the first National Youth Three Major Balls Games and won the championship.

== Club career ==
=== Shandong Taishan B ===
Shandong Taishan B competed in the China League Two in 2025. Chen was assigned the squad number 46 for Shandong Taishan B.

== International career ==
In January 2026, Chen was called up to the China U19 national team for a training camp in Zhaoqing, Guangdong. In March 2026, he served as captain for the China U19 national team in a match against Australia.

In May 2026, he was named in the China U19 squad for the 2026 Toulon Tournament in France. He was listed as a substitute for the group stage match against Colombia on 5 June 2026.

== Career statistics ==
=== Club ===
As of 8 July 2026

Appearances and goals by club, season and competition
Club	Season	League			National Cup		Continental		Other		Total	
Club	Season	Division	Apps	Goals	Apps	Goals	Apps	Goals	Apps	Goals	Apps	Goals
Shandong Taishan B	2026	China League Two	7	0	0	0	—		—		7	0
Career total			7	0	0	0	0	0	0	0	7	0

== Honours ==
Shandong U18

- National Youth Three Major Balls Games: 2024

Shandong U18

- National Games U18: 2025 silver medal
