= Jiang Yixiang =

Personal information
- Date of birth: 20 January 2008 (age 18)
- Place of birth: Dalian, Liaoning, China
- Height: 1.85 m (6 ft 1 in)
- Position: Midfielder

Team information
- Current team: Guangdong Mingtu (on loan from Shanghai Shenhua)
- Number: 5

Youth career
- 2023–2026: Graficar Belgrade

Senior career*
Years	Team	Apps	(Gls)
2026–	Shanghai Shenhua	0	(0)
2026	→ Jiangxi Dingnan United (loan)	2	(0)
2026–	→ Guangdong Mingtu (loan)	3	(0)

International career^{‡}
2024–2025	China U17		
2026–	China U20	5	(0)
- * Club domestic league appearances and goals as of 10 July 2026 ‡ National team caps and goals as of 10 July 2026

Jiang Yixiang (simplified Chinese: 姜轶祥; traditional Chinese: 姜軼祥; pinyin: Jiāng Yìxiáng; born 20 January 2008) is a Chinese professional footballer who plays as a midfielder for China League Two club Guangdong Mingtu, on loan from Chinese Super League club Shanghai Shenhua.

== Early life ==
Jiang was born on 20 January 2008 in Dalian, Liaoning. He began playing football under the influence of his father and received systematic football training at Dalian Dongbei Road Primary School, a school known for producing football talent.

== Club career ==
=== Graficar Belgrade ===
In October 2022, Jiang travelled to Serbia with his family to pursue his football career. After encountering difficulties with unlicensed intermediaries, he eventually secured a trial opportunity with Red Star Belgrade and joined its satellite club Graficar Belgrade. He obtained his registration certificate on 22 February 2024, enabling him to participate in official matches. Jiang began his overseas career in 2023, representing Graficar Belgrade's U17 team. He made 24 appearances and scored 6 goals in the Serbian U17 top division, serving as team captain. Due to his performances, he was promoted to the U19 team, where he made 7 appearances and scored 1 goal. In the following season, he played 6 matches for Graficar Belgrade's U19 team in the Serbian U19 top division.

=== Shanghai Shenhua ===
On 3 March 2026, Shanghai Shenhua officially announced the signing of Jiang. The club announced that he would be loaned to China League One club Jiangxi Dingnan United for the 2026 season to gain match experience.

=== Jiangxi Dingnan United ===
On 3 March 2026, Jiang was officially announced as joining Jiangxi Dingnan United on loan from Shanghai Shenhua. He wore the number 20 jersey for the club.

=== Guangdong Mingtu ===
On 29 June 2026, Guangdong Mingtu officially announced that Jiang had joined the club on loan from Shanghai Shenhua until the end of the 2026 season. The club stated that the signing was intended to strengthen the team's defensive capabilities in the midfield and defensive positions.

== International career ==
In May 2024, Jiang was called up to the China U16 national team for the fourth training camp, held from 22 May to 2 June 2024 at Shanghai Genbao Football Training Base. In February 2025, he was named in the 27-player squad for the U17 national team preparing for the 2025 AFC U-17 Asian Cup. However, he was not included in the final 23-player tournament squad announced on 29 March 2025.

In January 2026, Jiang was selected for the China U19 national team for the first training camp of 2026, held from 12 January to 9 February 2026 in Zhaoqing, Guangdong, as preparation for the 2027 AFC U-20 Asian Cup. In March 2026, he was called up to the U19 national team for the CFA Team China International Youth Competition in Yiwu, where China played two matches against Australia. On 28 March 2026, he started in the first match against Australia U19 in a 1–0 victory. In the second match on 31 March 2026, he was a substitute.

In May 2026, Jiang was named in the 26-player squad for the 2026 Toulon Tournament. On 5 June 2026, he started in the group stage match against Colombia U19.

== Career statistics ==
=== Club ===
As of 10 July 2026

Appearances and goals by club, season and competition
Club	Season	League			National Cup		Continental		Other		Total	
Club	Season	Division	Apps	Goals	Apps	Goals	Apps	Goals	Apps	Goals	Apps	Goals
Jiangxi Dingnan United (loan)	2026	China League One	2	0	0	0	—		—		2	0
Guangdong Mingtu (loan)	2026	China League Two	3	0	0	0	—		—		3	0
Career total			5	0	0	0	0	0	0	0	5	0
