= Elnizar Lohman =

Chinese footballer

Personal information
- Full name: Elnizar Lohman
- Date of birth: 14 April 2008 (age 18)
- Place of birth: Aksu, Xinjiang, China
- Height: 1.90 m (6 ft 3 in)
- Position: Centre-back

Team information
- Current team: Qingdao West Coast
- Number: 4

Youth career
- Evergrande Football School

Senior career*
Years	Team	Apps	(Gls)
2026	Guangdong Chenxing Juli	0	(0)
2026–	Qingdao West Coast	8	(0)

International career^{‡}
2024	China U16	1	(0)
2026–	China U19	2	(0)
- * Club domestic league appearances and goals as of 19 November 2026 ‡ National team caps and goals as of 21 October 2026

Elnizar Lohman (Chinese: 艾力尼扎尔·罗合曼; pinyin: Àilìnízhā'ěr Luōhémàn; born 14 April 2008) is a Chinese professional footballer who plays as a centre-back for Chinese Super League club Qingdao West Coast.

== Early life and youth career ==
Lohman was born on 14 April 2008 in Xayar County, Aksu Prefecture, Xinjiang. He grew up in the Evergrande Football School youth system. At age 11, he went to train at the Xinjiang Football Training Centre.

== Club career ==
=== Early career ===
In March 2026, Lohman joined Guangdong Chenxing Juli from the Evergrande Football School on a free transfer.

=== Qingdao West Coast ===
On 15 July 2026, Qingdao West Coast officially announced the signing of Lohman from Guangdong Chenxing Juli.

On 17 July 2026, Lohman made his debut for Qingdao West Coast in a Chinese Super League match against Chengdu Rongcheng, starting and playing 70 minutes before being substituted. In the match, he recorded one tackle, four clearances, and two successful aerial duels. He was substituted in the 70th minute with Qingdao West Coast leading 1–0; Chengdu Rongcheng equalised six minutes later through Felipe, and the match ended 1–1.

On 25 July 2026, Lohman came on as a substitute in Qingdao West Coast's 1–0 away win against Liaoning Tieren, playing 46 minutes.

== International career ==
Lohman has been called up to various Chinese youth national teams. In November 2024, he was named in the China U16 training camp list.

In February 2025, Lohman was included in the China U17 training camp squad for the 2025 AFC U-17 Asian Cup. He was included in the final squad for the tournament.

On 9 January 2026, Lohman was named in the China U19 training camp list. In June 2026, he started in China U19's 1–0 victory over Colombia U19 at the Maurice Revello Tournament.

== Career statistics ==
=== Club ===
As of 21 October 2026

Appearances and goals by club, season and competition
Club	Season	League			National Cup		Continental		Other		Total	
Club	Season	Division	Apps	Goals	Apps	Goals	Apps	Goals	Apps	Goals	Apps	Goals
Guangdong Chenxing Juli	2026	—	0	0	0	0	—		—		0	0
Qingdao West Coast	2026	Chinese Super League	7	0	1	0	—		—		8	0
Career total			7	0	1	0	0	0	0	0	8	0
