= Yang Mingrui =

Chinese footballer (born 2007)

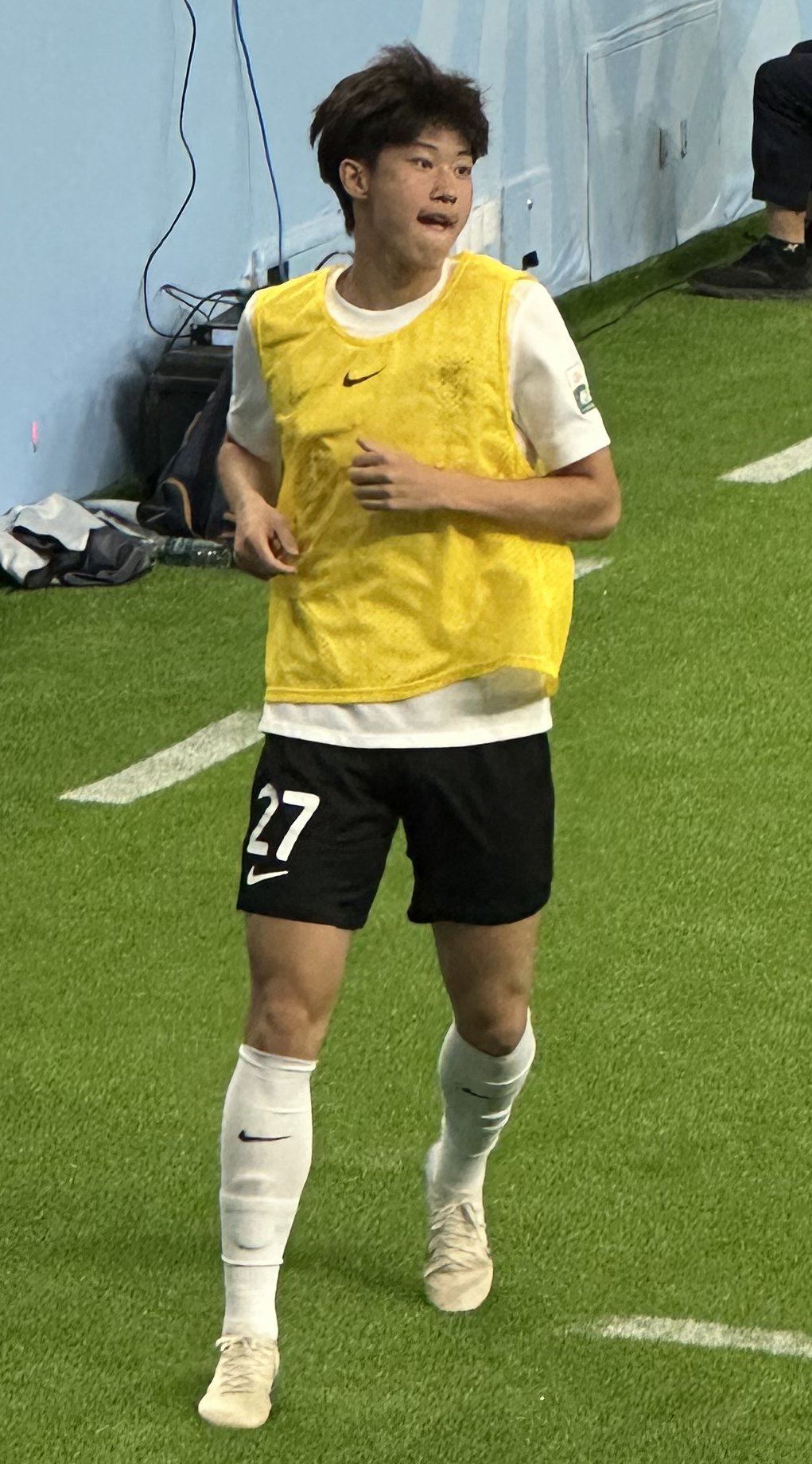
- Yang Mingrui in April 2025

Personal information
- Full name: Yang Mingrui
- Date of birth: 5 April 2007 (age 19)
- Place of birth: Yingkou, Liaoning, China
- Height: 1.80 m (5 ft 11 in)
- Position: Winger

Team information
- Current team: Dalian Yingbo
- Number: 27

Youth career
- 2019–2024: Dalian Pro

Senior career*
Years	Team	Apps	(Gls)
2024–	Dalian Yingbo	47	(3)

International career^{‡}
2023	China U17	3	(0)
2026–	China U19	2	(3)
2026–	China	3	(0)
- * Club domestic league appearances and goals as of 19 November 2026 ‡ National team caps and goals as of 22 November 2025

Yang Mingrui (simplified Chinese: 杨铭锐; traditional Chinese: 楊銘銳; pinyin: Yáng Míngruì; born 5 April 2007) is a Chinese professional footballer who plays as a winger for Chinese Super League club Dalian Yingbo and the China national team.

== Youth career ==
Yang Mingrui was born on 5 April 2007 in Bayuquan District, Yingkou, in the province of Liaoning. He became interested in football after seeing his elder cousin play the sport when Yang was in fourth grade. Over the next two years, his passion for football influenced his parents to eventually move from Yingkou to Dalian, Liaoning, in pursuit of better quality of football training for Yang. In this process, his father resigned from his previous workplace and found a new job in logistics in Dalian. Yang graduated from Dongbei Road Primary School, and joined the youth academy of Dalian Yifang thereafter. He later became the captain of his age group, and competed in the first edition of the China Youth Football League.

In October 2025, Yang Mingrui won a gold medal with the Liaoning U18 at the under-18 men's football event of the 2025 National Games of China, after winning against Shandong U18 in the final.

== Club career ==
=== Dalian Yingbo ===
On 11 July 2024, seven months after the dissolution of Dalian Pro, Yang signed for China League One club Dalian Yingbo. Just two days later, he made his senior debut in a 2–0 league victory over Suzhou Dongwu. During the 2024 China League One season, Dalian Yingbo were promoted to the 2025 Chinese Super League after securing the runner-up position, while Yang made no further appearances for the entire rest of the season.

On 29 March 2025, Yang made his first start for Dalian Yingbo in their 2–0 home win against Changchun Yatai, playing 62 minutes of the match. In featuring for his side in the match, Yang became the first 2007-born footballer to play in the Chinese Super League. On 1 November, he scored his first professional goal, breaking the deadlock in a 2–2 away draw against Meizhou Hakka.

== International career ==
In June 2023, Yang was called up to play in the 2023 AFC U-17 Asian Cup.

In 2025, Yang was involved in training camps of both China U22 and China U18 youth teams.

On 24 September 2026, Yang made his debut for the senior China national team in a friendly against the Maldives.

== Career statistics ==
=== Club ===
As of 22 November 2025

Appearances and goals by club, season, and competition
Club	Season	League			Cup		Continental		Other		Total	
Club	Season	Division	Apps	Goals	Apps	Goals	Apps	Goals	Apps	Goals	Apps	Goals
Dalian Yingbo	2024	China League One	1	0	0	0	–		–		1	0
Dalian Yingbo	2025	Chinese Super League	18	1	1	0	–		–		19	1
Dalian Yingbo	Total		19	1	1	0	0	0	0	0	20	1
Career total			19	1	1	0	0	0	0	0	20	1

== Honours ==
Liaoning U18

- Football at the National Games of China: 2025

Dalian Yingbo

- Chinese Super League: 2026
