= Ihsen Ilham =

Chinese footballer

Personal information
- Date of birth: 8 August 2008 (age 18)
- Place of birth: Kashgar, Xinjiang, China
- Height: 1.87 m (6 ft 2 in)
- Position: Goalkeeper

Team information
- Current team: Shandong Taishan B
- Number: 13

Youth career
- Shandong Luneng Taishan Football School

Senior career*
Years	Team	Apps	(Gls)
2026–	Shandong Taishan B	6	(0)

International career^{‡}
2024–2025	China U17		
2025–	China U19		
- * Club domestic league appearances and goals as of 8 July 2026 ‡ National team caps and goals as of 8 July 2026

Ihsen Ilham (Chinese: 依合散·依拉木; pinyin: Yīhésàn Yīlāmù; born 8 August 2008) is a Chinese professional footballer who plays as a goalkeeper for China League Two club Shandong Taishan B.

== Early life and youth career ==
Ihsen Ilham was born on 8 August 2008 in Xinjiang. He is a native of Kashgar. Ilham said that he was relatively tall from a young age, reaching 155 cm at the age of eight, and his coach arranged for him to play as a goalkeeper. He began his career at the Shandong Luneng Taishan Football School.

== Club career ==
=== Shandong Taishan B ===
In 2026, Ilham played for Shandong Taishan B in China League Two. On 24 June 2026, he started in a 3–1 away win over Beijing Institute of Technology, saving a penalty in the match. As of that match, he had made six appearances in the league for the club during the season.

== International career ==
=== China U16 ===
In August 2024, Ilham was called up to the China U16 national team for the Shenyang Peace Cup international invitational tournament. After the tournament, he wrote on social media: "First time representing the national team, I did not show the best version of myself." He played against Japan U16 in the tournament, and after the match he said: "The second goal conceded yesterday was my responsibility."

=== China U17 ===
On 27 February 2025, Ilham was named in the China U17 training squad for the 2025 U17 AFC Asian Cup. On 29 March 2025, he was selected in the final 23-man squad for the tournament, wearing the number 13 shirt. Before the tournament, Ilham stated: "My own goal is to first advance from the group stage, and to get the best goalkeeper award."

On 4 April 2025, Ilham started in the opening group match against Saudi Arabia at the U17 Asian Cup. In the 11th minute, he slipped while attempting to collect the ball outside the penalty area, conceding an open goal to Mataari as Saudi Arabia took a 1–0 lead. On 6 April 2025, he started in the second group match against Uzbekistan, making several saves as China lost 1–2.

=== China U18 ===
On 16 August 2025, Ilham was named in the first training camp squad of the China U18 national team. On 6 November 2025, he was selected for the second U18 training camp.

=== China U19 ===
On 9 January 2026, Ilham was named in the China U19 training squad. On 22 May 2026, he was selected in the squad for the 2026 Toulon Tournament.

On 5 June 2026, in the third group match against Colombia at the Toulon Tournament, Ilham saved a penalty from Orozco in first-half stoppage time and made eight saves in total as China won 1–0. He was named player of the match.

== Career statistics ==
=== Club ===
As of 25 June 2026

Appearances and goals by club, season and competition
Club	Season	League			National Cup		Continental		Other		Total	
Club	Season	Division	Apps	Goals	Apps	Goals	Apps	Goals	Apps	Goals	Apps	Goals
Shandong Taishan B	2026	China League Two	6	0	0	0	—		—		6	0
Career total			6	0	0	0	—		—		6	0

== Honours ==
Shandong Luneng Taishan U12

- Maryle Cup: 2020
