= Yang Zhanpeng =

Chinese footballer (born 2007)

Personal information
- Date of birth: 5 March 2007 (age 19)
- Place of birth: Guangzhou, Guangdong, China
- Height: 1.76 m (5 ft 9 in)
- Position: Midfielder

Team information
- Current team: Qingdao West Coast
- Number: 30

Youth career
- 2016–2023: Guangzhou City

Senior career*
Years	Team	Apps	(Gls)
2025–	Qingdao West Coast	22	(2)

International career^{‡}
2021	China U16		
2025–	China U20	4	(0)
- * Club domestic league appearances and goals as of 19 November 2026 ‡ National team caps and goals as of 11 July 2026

Yang Zhanpeng (simplified Chinese: 杨展彭; traditional Chinese: 楊展彭; pinyin: Yáng Zhǎnpéng; born 5 March 2007) is a Chinese professional footballer who plays as a midfielder for Chinese Super League club Qingdao West Coast.

== Early life and youth career ==
Yang was born on 5 March 2007. He joined the Guangzhou City youth academy in 2016. In September 2019, Yang participated in the U12 Global Youth Football Challenge Cup in Osaka, Japan, with Guangzhou City's U12 team, scoring 6 goals and winning the tournament's Golden Boot award as the team finished as runners-up.

In November 2021, Yang scored a hat-trick in the final of the Guangdong Provincial Governor's Cup (Men's Group B), helping Guangzhou City's 07 age-group team defeat Guangzhou City Football School's 07 age-group team 4–1 to defend their title.

== Club career ==
=== Guangzhou City ===
Yang came through the Guangzhou City youth system. In August 2023, he appeared in a friendly match for Guangzhou E-Power (then known as Guangzhou Leopards) against Hong Kong U23, starting the match. Guangzhou City ceased operations in 2023.

=== Qingdao West Coast ===
In February 2026, Yang joined Qingdao West Coast as part of the first batch of domestic players for the 2026 season, alongside Peng Xinli, Dong Yu, Liu Shibo, and others. Yang was assigned the squad number 30.

On 8 March 2026, Yang made his professional debut, starting in Qingdao West Coast's Chinese Super League match away against Zhejiang. He was substituted off in the 51st minute.

On 5 May 2026, in a match against Tianjin Jinmen Tiger, Yang was fouled in the penalty area by Chen Zhexuan in the 3rd minute, resulting in a penalty for Qingdao West Coast, which was subsequently saved by goalkeeper Yan Bingliang. In the 85th minute, Yang's shot from outside the penalty area hit the goalpost.

On 10 May 2026, Yang scored his first professional goal in the 23rd minute of a match against Wuhan Three Towns, volleying in a cross from Nélson da Luz to give Qingdao West Coast a 1–0 lead. At 19 years and 66 days old, he became the first player under 20 to score for Qingdao West Coast in the Chinese Super League. He was substituted off after receiving a yellow card.

== International career ==
In May 2021, Yang was called up to the China U16 national team for a training camp held from 16 to 31 May 2021 at the Xianghe National Football Training Base. At 14 years old, he was selected as a "jump-grade" player, being from the 2007 age group while the team was for 2006 age group players.

In 2025, Yang was called up to the China U18 national team.

On 28 March 2026, Yang started for the China U20 team (competing as China U19) in a 1–0 victory over Australia U19.

== Career statistics ==
=== Club ===
As of 11 July 2026

Appearances and goals by club, season and competition
Club	Season	League			National Cup		Continental		Other		Total	
Club	Season	Division	Apps	Goals	Apps	Goals	Apps	Goals	Apps	Goals	Apps	Goals
Qingdao West Coast	2026	Chinese Super League	13	1	1	0	—		—		14	1
Career total			13	1	1	0	0	0	0	0	14	1

== Honours ==
Guangzhou City U12

- U12 Global Youth Football Challenge Cup runner-up: 2019

Guangzhou City 07

- Guangdong Provincial Governor's Cup (Men's Group B): 2021
