= Qingdao West Coast F.C. =

Association football club in China

Qingdao West Coast 青岛西海岸
- Full name: Qingdao West Coast Football Club 青岛西海岸足球俱乐部
- Founded: 20 August 2007; 19 years ago
- Ground: Qingdao West Coast University City Sports Center
- Capacity: 20,000
- Chairman: Shen Jun
- Head coach: Zheng Zhi
- League: Chinese Super League
- 2026: Chinese Super League, 8th of 16
Home colours	Away colours

Qingdao West Coast Football Club (Chinese: 青岛西海岸足球俱乐部; pinyin: Qīngdǎo Xīhǎi'àn Zúqiú Jùlèbù) is a Chinese professional football club based in Qingdao, Shandong, that competes in the Chinese Super League, the top tier of Chinese football. Qingdao West Coast plays its home matches at the Qingdao West Coast University City Sports Center, located within Huangdao District.

== History ==
Qingdao Kangtaiyuan F.C. was founded in 2007 by Qingdao Kangtine Commercial Concrete Co., Ltd. as a company football team for their employees. The club would initially participate in local amateur and futsal tournaments until the 2011 league season when they participated in the Qingdao Football Association Cup and were knocked out in the last sixteen. The following season, they joined the Chinese football league pyramid in the second tier of the Qingdao League or seventh tier overall.

In 2017, after a third-place finish in the Qingdao City League, they changed their name to Qingdao Kangtine and participated in the China Amateur Football League for the first time. They advanced to the national play-offs after finishing first in their group but were eventually eliminated by Qinghai Zhuangbo.

In 2018, they were crowned champions of the Qingdao City League, and participated in the Chinese Champions League for a second time. However, they were eliminated by Taizhou Yuanda in the regional group stage play-offs and failed to advance to the national play-offs.

In 2019, they changed their name to Qingdao Zhongchuang Hengtai. In their third attempt at the highest level of amateur football league, they were eliminated once again by Shandong Wangyue in the group stage play-offs, but were later admitted into the national stage after the withdrawal of Huizhou Huixin. They eventually finished 8th and were promoted to China League Two for the first time in the club's history.

In January 2021, they changed their name to Qingdao Youth Island. They finished 4th this season and entered the promotion-relegation play-offs against Beijing BIT, who finished 17th in the 2021 China League One. Qingdao won 5–4 on penalties after drawing 2–2 on aggregate, gaining promotion to China League One for the first time in the club's history.

== Name history ==
- 2007–2017: Qingdao Kangtaiyuan F.C. (青岛康太源)
- 2017–2018: Qingdao Kangtine F.C. (青岛康太源)
- 2019–2020: Qingdao Zhongchuang Hengtai F.C. (青岛中创恒泰)
- 2021–2022: Qingdao Youth Island F.C. (青岛青春岛)
- 2023–: Qingdao West Coast F.C. (青岛西海岸)

== Players ==
=== Current squad ===
As of July 2026

Note: Flags indicate national team as defined under FIFA eligibility rules; some limited exceptions apply. Players may hold more than one non-FIFA nationality.

No.	Pos.	Nation	Player
2	DF	BRA	Bruno Viana
3	DF	CHN	Zhao Honglüe
4	DF	CHN	Elnizar Lohman
5	DF	BIH	Samir Memišević
6	MF	CHN	Jin Shiming
8	MF	CHN	Zhang Xiuwei
9	FW	GHA	Abdul-Aziz Yakubu
10	FW	ANG	Nelson da Luz
11	FW	BRA	Davidson
15	DF	CHN	Wang Peng
16	GK	CHN	Li Hao
18	MF	HKG	Barak Braunshtain
19	DF	CHN	Dong Yu
20	MF	CHN	He Longhai
21	MF	CHN	Meng Jingchao (on loan from Shanghai Port)
22	MF	CHN	Wang Gengrui

No.	Pos.	Nation	Player
25	MF	CHN	Peng Xinli
26	GK	CHN	Liu Shibo
27	FW	CHN	Afrden Asqer (on loan from Shanghai Port)
28	DF	CHN	Zhang Chengdong
29	FW	CHN	Jia Weiwei
30	MF	CHN	Yang Zhanpeng
31	MF	CHN	Alexander Xie
32	DF	CHN	Ding Haifeng
33	DF	CHN	Liu Zhicheng
35	MF	CHN	Nan Song
36	DF	CHN	Sun Jie
37	GK	CHN	Dong Hang
47	FW	CHN	Zhang Boxuan
57	GK	CHN	Qi Bingyu
60	GK	CHN	Wang Ziquan

=== Reserve squad ===
Note: Flags indicate national team as defined under FIFA eligibility rules; some limited exceptions apply. Players may hold more than one non-FIFA nationality.

No.	Pos.	Nation	Player

=== Out on loan ===
Note: Flags indicate national team as defined under FIFA eligibility rules; some limited exceptions apply. Players may hold more than one non-FIFA nationality.

No.	Pos.	Nation	Player
—	MF	CHN	Mu Zihan (at Foshan Nanshi until 31 December 2026)
—	MF	CHN	Abduhelil Osmanjan (at Qingdao Red Lions until 31 December 2026)

No.	Pos.	Nation	Player
—	MF	CHN	Song Haoyu (at Shijiazhuang Gongfu until 31 December 2026)
—	FW	CHN	Wang Xinyou (at Guangdong Mingtu until 31 December 2026)
—	FW	CHN	Liu Xiaolong (at Shenzhen Juniors until 31 December 2026)

== Coaching staff ==
Position	Staff
Head coach	(China) Zheng Zhi
Assistant coach	(China) Huang Bowen (China) Mei Fang (China) Liu Jian (China) Ge Zhen (Spain) Javi Morillas Jimenez
Goalkeeping coach	(China) Li Leilei
Fitness coach	(Spain) Willam

Source: CFA

== Managerial history ==
- (China) Zhou Xin (2018–2023)
- (Bulgaria) Zoran Janković (interim) (2023)
- (Japan) Hisashi Kurosaki (2024)
- (China) Shao Jiayi (2024–2025)
- (China) Zheng Zhi (2026–)

== Results ==
All-time league rankings

As of the end of 2026 season.

Year	Div	Pld	W	D	L	GF	GA	GD	Pts	Pos.	FA Cup	Super Cup	AFC	Att./G	Stadium
2018	4	3	1	0	2	1	2	-1	N/A^{2}	N/A^{1}	DNQ	DNQ	DNQ		Taixing Sports Center Stadium
2019	4	11	5	3	3	13	14	-1	18	8	DNQ	DNQ	DNQ		
2020	3	9	4	2	3	11	9	2	14^{2}	8	DNQ	DNQ	DNQ		
2021	3	28	13	9	6	44	26	18	48	4	R16	DNQ	DNQ		
2022	2	34	13	9	12	47	44	3	48	8	R1	DNQ	DNQ		
2023	2	30	17	10	3	44	22	22	61	RU	R4	DNQ	DNQ	5,515	Guzhenkou University City Sports Center Stadium
2024	1	30	8	8	14	41	58	-17	32	10	R5	DNQ	DNQ		
2025	1	30	10	10	10	39	43	-4	40	9	QF	DNQ	DNQ		
2026	1	30	8	15	7	32	42	-10	39	8	R5	DNQ	DNQ		

- ^{1} Only include Regional Finals and National Finals.
- ^{2} In group stage.

Key

	China top division
	China second division
	China third division
	China fourth division
W	Winners
RU	Runners-up
3	Third place
	Relegated

- Pld = Played
- W = Games won
- D = Games drawn
- L = Games lost
- F = Goals for
- A = Goals against
- Pts = Points
- Pos = Final position
- DNQ = Did not qualify
- DNE = Did not enter
- NH = Not held
- WD = Withdrawal
- – = Does not exist
- R1 = Round 1
- R2 = Round 2
- R3 = Round 3
- R4 = Round 4
- F = Final
- SF = Semi-finals
- QF = Quarter-finals
- R16 = Round of 16
- Group = Group stage
- GS2 = Second Group stage
- QR1 = First Qualifying Round
- QR2 = Second Qualifying Round
- QR3 = Third Qualifying Round
