= China national under-20 football team =

National association football team

China U-20
- Association: Chinese Football Association
- Confederation: AFC (Asia)
- Head coach: Dejan Đurđević
- Captain: Chen Zihan
- FIFA code: CHN
First colours	Second colours

FIFA U-20 World Cup
- Appearances: 5 (first in 1983)
- Best result: Quarter-finals (1985)

AFC U-20 Asian Cup
- Appearances: 21 (first in 1975)
- Best result: Champions (1985)

The China national under-20 football team, also known as the China Youth Team (国青队), represents the People's Republic of China in international football competitions in the FIFA U-20 World Cup and the AFC U-20 Asian Cup, as well as any other under-20 international football tournaments. It is governed by the Chinese Football Association (CFA).

== History ==
In 2017, the under-20 team began playing in the Regionalliga Südwest, a fourth-division German league, as part of an agreement between the two countries. The team would play friendly matches to fill in for the missing 20th club in the league's schedule. During the team's match on 17 November against TSV Schott Mainz, the display of a Tibetan flag led to the team walking off in protest. In the aftermath, all upcoming friendly matches were cancelled.

On 28 September 2018, China U-19 Yellow (B team) was organised as support for the national under-20 football team. Serbian manager Aleksandar Janković was appointed the first head coach of the team

== Honours ==
- AFC U-20 Asian Cup

Winners (1): 1985
Runners-up (3): 1982, 1996, 2004
Third-places (2): 1966, 2000

- East Asian Games

Winners (1): 2005
Third-places (2): 1993, 1997

== Competition history ==
=== FIFA World Youth Championship / FIFA U-20 World Cup record ===
Year	Result	Pos	P	W	D	L	F	A
1977 to 1981	DNE	–	–	–	–	–	–	–
(Mexico) 1983	First round	12	3	1	0	2	5	8
(Soviet Union) 1985	Quarter-finalist	7	4	2	0	2	5	5
1987 to 1995	DNQ	–	–	–	–	–	–	–
(Malaysia) 1997	First round	18	3	0	2	1	2	3
(Nigeria) 1999	DNQ	–	–	–	–	–	–	–
(Argentina) 2001	Last 16	15	4	1	1	2	2	3
(United Arab Emirates) 2003	DNQ	–	–	–	–	–	–	–
(Netherlands) 2005	Last 16	10	4	3	0	1	11	7
2007 to 2025	DNQ	–	–	–	–	–	–	–
(Azerbaijan) (Uzbekistan) 2027	TBD	–	–	–	–	–	–	–
(Armenia) (Georgia (country)) 2029	TBD	–	–	–	–	–	–	–
Total	–	–	18	7	3	8	25	26

* DNE = Did not enter; DNQ = Did not qualify; Pos = Position; P = Matches played; W = Matches won; D = Matches drawn; L = Matches lost; F = Goals for; A = Goals against.
* Denotes draws include knockout matches decided on penalty kicks.

=== AFC U-19 Championship/AFC U-20 Asian Cup ===
Year	Result	Pld	W	D	L	GF	GA
1959 to 1974	DNP (Note: Nationalist China take part in AFC Youth Championship 1959 to 1974, not China PR.)						
(Kuwait) 1975	Quarterfinals	5	2	2	1	6	3
(Thailand) 1976	Quarterfinals	4	1	2	1	7	8
(Iran) 1977	DNP						
(Bangladesh) 1978	Group Stage	3	1	0	2	3	4
(Thailand) 1980	DNQ	–	–	–	–	–	–
(Thailand) 1982	Runners-up	3	1	2	0	4	3
(United Arab Emirates) 1985	Champions	3	2	1	0	5	3
(Saudi Arabia) 1986	DNQ	–	–	–	–	–	–
(Qatar) 1988	Group Stage	3	0	0	3	3	9
1990 to 1994	DNQ	–	–	–	–	–	–
(South Korea) 1996	Runners-up	6	5	0	1	16	9
(Thailand) 1998	Group Stage	4	1	1	2	7	8
(Iran) 2000	3rd Place	6	3	2	1	7	5
(Qatar) 2002	Quarterfinals	4	1	1	2	7	10
(Malaysia) 2004	Runners-up	6	4	1	1	10	3
(India) 2006	Quarterfinals	4	3	0	1	5	3
(Saudi Arabia) 2008	Quarterfinals	4	2	2	0	9	1
(China) 2010	Quarterfinals	4	2	1	1	6	4
(United Arab Emirates) 2012	Group Stage	3	0	0	3	2	5
(Myanmar) 2014	Quarterfinals	4	1	2	1	5	6
(Bahrain) 2016	Group Stage	3	0	1	2	0	3
(Indonesia) 2018	Group Stage	3	1	0	2	2	2
~~(Uzbekistan) 2020~~	DNQ and cancelled	–	–	–	–	–	–
(Uzbekistan) 2023	Quarterfinals	4	1	1	2	5	6
(China) 2025	Quarterfinals	4	2	0	2	8	6
(China) 2027	Qualified as hosts	–	–	–	–	–	–
(China) 2029	Qualified as hosts	–	–	–	–	–	–
Total	–	80	33	19	28	117	101

- DNP : Did not participate
- DNQ : Did not qualify

=== Toulon Tournament ===
- 1979 Toulon Tournament
- 1980 Toulon Tournament
- 1983 Toulon Tournament as Tianjin
- 1998 Toulon Tournament
- 2002 Toulon Tournament
- 2004 Toulon Tournament
- 2006 Toulon Tournament
- 2007 Toulon Tournament
- 2011 Toulon Tournament
- 2014 Toulon Tournament
- 2015 Toulon Tournament
- 2018 Toulon Tournament
- 2019 Toulon Tournament
- 2026 Maurice Revello Tournament

=== Torneo di Viareggio ===
- 2019 Torneo di Viareggio

== Recent matches ==
The following is a list of match results in the last 12 months, as well as any future matches that have been scheduled.

Legend

Win Draw Loss Fixture

=== 2026 ===
5 February Friendly	China	1–0	Uzbekistan	Zhaoqing, China
16:00 UTC+8	Jia Weiwei 6'			Stadium: Zhaoqing New District Sports Center Stadium; Referee: Liang Songshang (China)

9 February Friendly	China	1–1	Uzbekistan	Zhaoqing, China
16:00 UTC+8	Yang Mingrui 59'		Nurbek Sarsenbaev 30'	Stadium: Zhaoqing New District Sports Center Stadium; Referee: Li Haixin (China)

28 March Yiwu International Tournament	China	1–0	Australia	Yiwu, China
15:00 UTC+8	Yang Mingrui 31'	Report		Stadium: Yiwu Meihu Sports Centre; Attendance: 10,397; Referee: Wang Di (China)

31 March Yiwu International Tournament	China	2–4	Australia	Yiwu, China
19:35 UTC+8	Yang Mingrui 68', 87'		Macallister 48' (pen.); Antoniou 56'; Dobson 76'; Tatu 82'	Stadium: Yiwu Meihu Sports Centre; Attendance: 6,749; Referee: Zhang Lei (China)

31 May Maurice Revello Tournament	China	1–0	Saudi Arabia	Avignon, France
15:00 UTC+2	Dahal 12' (o.g.)	Report		Stadium: Parc des Sports; Referee: Natálie Čampišová (Czech Republic)

2 June Maurice Revello Tournament	China	0–3	DR Congo	Aubagne, France
15:00 UTC+2		Report	Bayanginisa 58'; Makala 62'; Balumuene 83'	Stadium: Stade de Lattre-de-Tassigny; Referee: Natálie Čampišová (Czech Republic)

5 June Maurice Revello Tournament	Colombia	0–1	China	Avignon, France
15:00 UTC+2		Report	Liu Jiale 1'	Stadium: Parc des Sports; Referee: Florian Exner (Germany)

7 June Maurice Revello Tournament	China	0–3	Tunisia	Aubagne, France
18:30 UTC+2		Report	Chtai-Telamio 13'; Dhouib 50'; Dhaou 90+2'	Stadium: Stade de Lattre-de-Tassigny; Referee: Olivia Tschon (Austria)

1 October Friendly	China	2–1	Indonesia	Xianghe, China
15:00 UTC+8	Alexander Xie 21'; Zhu Xinyu 48'	Report	A. Kaka 37'	Stadium: National Football Training Centre

4 October Friendly	China	1–0	Indonesia	Xianghe, China
15:00 UTC+8	Wen Junxiang 47'	Report		Stadium: National Football Training Centre

11 November Panda Cup	China	3–1	Vietnam	Chengdu, China
19:35 UTC+8	Yang Zhanpeng 15', 74' (pen.); Jia Weiwei 90+3'	Report	Moric 79'	Stadium: Shuangliu Sports Centre; Attendance: 3,375; Referee: Huang Yi (China)

14 November Panda Cup	China	1–1	Tajikistan	Chengdu, China
19:35 UTC+8	Peng Ziming 13'	Report	Bakhtaliev 14'	Stadium: Shuangliu Sports Centre; Attendance: 3,893; Referee: Ma Yunkun (China)

17 November Panda Cup	China	2–1	South Korea	Chengdu, China
19:35 UTC+8	Miao Rundong 5'; Yang Mingrui 10' (pen.)	Report	Kim Ji-hyuk 74'	Stadium: Shuangliu Sports Centre; Attendance: 4,082; Referee: Wang Jing (China)

== Squad ==
=== Current coaches ===
Team manager	(China) Chen Kai
Head coach	(Serbia) Dejan Đurđević
Assistant coach	(China) Zang Haili (Serbia) Slobodan Ristić
Goalkeeper coach	(China) Li Shuai
Team doctor	(China) Feng Sheyang

=== Current squad ===
The players below were called up for the 2026 Panda Cup.

No.	Pos.	Player	Date of birth (age)	Club
32	GK	Fan Mengtong	21 March 2007 (aged 19)	(Chinese Football Association) Guangzhou Dandelion
13	GK	Ihsen Ilham	8 August 2008 (aged 18)	(Chinese Football Association) Shandong Taishan B
1	GK	Wu Zitong	27 April 2007 (aged 19)	(Chinese Football Association) Chongqing Tonglianglong
2	DF	Wang Gengrui	16 September 2008 (aged 18)	(Chinese Football Association) Qingdao West Coast
29	DF	Yue Ruijie	16 November 2007 (aged 18)	(Chinese Football Association) Chongqing Tonglianglong
6	DF	Elnizar Lohman	14 April 2008 (aged 18)	(Chinese Football Association) Qingdao West Coast
3	DF	Guo Wuyue	8 May 2007 (aged 19)	(Chinese Football Association) Shaanxi Union
4	DF	Deng Jiefu	28 June 2007 (aged 19)	(Chinese Football Association) Beijing Guoan
15	DF	Zhang Hongfu	22 August 2008 (aged 18)	(Chinese Football Association) Liaoning Tieren
30	DF	Jin Wenxu	4 May 2007 (aged 19)	(Chinese Football Association) Shaanxi Union
26	DF	Zhong Wenze	3 October 2007 (aged 19)	(Chinese Football Association) Guangdong Mingtu
14	DF	Song Hengda	28 June 2007 (aged 19)	(Chinese Football Association) Jiangsu Changjin
16	MF	Peng Ziming	12 November 2008 (aged 17)	(Chinese Football Association) Shanghai Port
18	MF	Liu Jiale	12 February 2008 (aged 18)	(Chinese Football Association) Chongqing Tonglianglong
27	MF	Wu Qipeng	28 February 2007 (aged 19)	(Chinese Football Association) Shanghai Shenhua
22	MF	Zhu Xinyu	7 May 2008 (aged 18)	(Chinese Football Association) Guangdong Mingtu
10	MF	Yang Zhanpeng	5 March 2007 (aged 19)	(Chinese Football Association) Qingdao West Coast
20	MF	Alexander Xie	5 May 2007 (aged 19)	(Chinese Football Association) Qingdao West Coast
8	MF	Jiang Yixiang	20 January 2008 (aged 18)	(Chinese Football Association) Guangdong Mingtu
21	MF	Yang Yang	7 April 2007 (aged 19)	(Chinese Football Association) Shandong Taishan
11	MF	Yang Mingrui	5 April 2007 (aged 19)	(Chinese Football Association) Dalian Yingbo
7	MF	Miao Rundong	22 May 2007 (aged 19)	(Chinese Football Association) Jiangsu Changjin
19	MF	Zhang Tongrui	31 December 2007 (aged 18)	(Chinese Football Association) Jiangsu Changjin
17	MF	Wei Xiangxin	5 March 2008 (aged 18)	(French Football Federation) AJ Auxerre
5	FW	Jia Weiwei	22 February 2007 (aged 19)	(Chinese Football Association) Qingdao West Coast
24	FW	Wei Zijian	11 March 2008 (aged 18)	(Chinese Football Association) Zhejiang FC
12	FW	Zhao Chenwei	29 June 2007 (aged 19)	(Chinese Football Association) Shijiazhuang Gongfu
9	FW	Zhang Jiaming	7 March 2007 (aged 19)	(The Football Association) Burnley

== List of head coaches ==
Manage records only includes International Country results

#	Name	Period	Played	Won	Drawn	Lost	GF	GA	Win %	Achievements
1	(Hungary) A Joseph	1954 – 1955	1	1	0	0	3	2	100%	
2	(China) Nian Weisi	1966 – 1971	13	2	8	3	12	21	15.83%	3rd place at the 1966 AFC Youth Championship
3	(China) Sun Baorong	1972 – 1973	4	2	1	1	12	8	50.00%	
4	(China) Chen Chengda	1974	6	3	1	2	7	9	50.00%	
5	(China) Zhang Honggen	1975 – 1976	9	3	4	2	13	9	33.33%	
6	(China) Xian Dihong	1976	1	0	0	1	2	3	0	
7	(China) Zhang Shixun	1976	0	0	0	0	0	0	–	
8	(China) Chen Jiagen	1977	0	0	0	0	0	0	–	
9	(China) Zhang Honggen	1977	3	2	1	0	4	2	66.67%	
10	(China) Chen Jiagen (2nd time)	1978	6	2	0	4	7	9	33.33%	
11	(China) Zhang Junxiu	1978	6	1	0	5	3	12	16.67%	
12	(China) Xian Dixiong (2nd time)	1979	1	0	0	1	0	1	0	
13	(China) Shao Xiankang	1980	4	1	0	3	1	19	25.00%	
14	(China) Zhang Junxiu (2nd time)	1980	4	2	0	2	13	4	50.00%	
15	(China) Gao Fengwen	1981 – 1983	18	12	3	3	32	17	66.67%	Runners-up of the 1982 AFC Youth Championship first round of the 1983 FIFA World Youth Championship
	(China) Xie Hongjun	1983 (U-19)	4	1	0	3	3	7	25.00%	
	(China) Li Chuanqi	1983 (U-18)	5	1	0	4	3	17	20.00%	
16	(China) Zhang Zhicheng	1984 – 1986	32	18	4	10	63	23	56.25%	Champions of the 1985 AFC Youth Championship; Quarter final of the 1985 FIFA World Youth Championship
17	(China) Liu Minxin	1986 – 1988	21	15	2	4	58	20	71.43%	
18	(China) Chen Xirong	1988 – 1990	23	12	3	8	53	20	52.17%	
19	(China) Zhu Guanghu	1991 – 1992	7	2	3	2	9	9	28.57%	
20	(China) Zhang Zhicheng (2nd time)	1993 – 1994	2	1	0	1	2	2	50.00%	
21	(China) Gai Zengchen	1995 – 1996	0	0	0	0	0	0	–	
22	(China) Tang Pengju	1996 – 1997	14	11	1	2	48	16	78.57%	Runners-up of the 1996 AFC Youth Championship
23	(China) Zhu Guanghu (2nd time)	1997 – 1998	24	7	7	10	30	27	29.17%	First round of the 1997 FIFA World Youth Championship
24	(China) Chen Jingang	1998	4	1	1	2	7	8	25.00%	
25	(England) Keith Blunt	1999	0	0	0	0	0	0	–	
26	(China) Shen Xiangfu	2000 – 2001	27	13	5	9	46	29	48.15%	3rd place at the 2000 AFC Youth Championship; Round of 16 of the 2001 FIFA World Youth Championship
27	(China) Wang Baoshan	2001 – 2002	8	4	2	2	15	13	50.00%	
28	(China) Jia Xiuquan	2003 – 2004	6	5	1	0	17	2	83.33%	
29	(China) Yin Tiesheng	2004 – 2005	18	9	4	5	21	12	50.00%	Runners-up at the 2004 AFC Youth Championship
30	(Germany) Eckhard Krautzun	2005	8	4	1	3	16	13	50.00%	Round of 16 of the 2005 FIFA World Youth Championship
	(China) Jia Xiuquan	2006 (U-21)	5	4	0	1	12	4	80.00%	
31	(China) Jia Xiuquan (2nd time)	2005 – 2006	17	10	3	3	48	19	58.82%	
32	(China) Liu Chunming	2007 – 2008	26	12	7	7	53	20	46.15%	
33	(China) Su Maozhen	2009 – 2011								
34	(Netherlands) Jan Olde Riekerink	2011 – 2012								
35	(Argentina) Luis Manuel Blanco	2012								
36	(China) Li Bing	2013 – 2014								
37	(China) Zheng Xiong (Caretaker)	2014								
38	(China) Li Ming	2015 – 2018								
39	(China) Cheng Yaodong	2018 – 2024								
40	(Serbia) Dejan Đurđević	2024 – Present								

== Head-to-head record ==
The following table shows China's head-to-head record in the FIFA U-20 World Cup.

Opponent	Pld	W	D	L	GF	GA	GD	Win %
Argentina	2	0	0	2	1	7	−6	0.00
Austria	1	1	0	0	3	0	+3	100.00
Chile	1	0	0	1	0	1	−1	0.00
Czech Republic	1	0	0	1	2	3	−1	0.00
England	1	1	0	0	2	0	+2	100.00
Germany	1	0	0	1	2	3	−1	0.00
Ghana	1	0	1	0	1	1	+0	0.00
Mexico	1	0	0	1	1	3	−2	0.00
Panama	1	1	0	0	4	1	+3	100.00
Paraguay	1	1	0	0	2	1	+1	100.00
Republic of Ireland	1	0	1	0	1	1	+0	0.00
Soviet Union	1	0	0	1	0	1	−1	0.00
Turkey	1	1	0	0	2	1	+1	100.00
Ukraine	2	1	1	0	3	2	+1	50.00
United States	2	1	0	1	1	1	+0	50.00
Total	18	7	3	8	25	26	−1	38.89
