= 2026 Shanghai Port F.C. season =

Shanghai Port
2026 season
- Manager: (Australia) Kevin Muscat
- Stadium: Pudong Football Stadium
- Top goalscorer: League: Leonardo (12 goals); All: Leonardo (14 goals)
Home colours	Away colours

The 2026 Shanghai Port F.C. season is the 20th season in the club's history. During this season, the club will participate in the following competitions: Chinese Super League, FA Cup, AFC Champions League Elite & AFC Champions League Elite.

== Squad ==
As of 24 Feb 2025

No.	Name	Nationality	Date of birth (age)	Previous club	Contract since	Contract end
Goalkeepers
1	Yan Junling	(China)	28 January 1991 (age 35)	(China) Genbao Football Academy		
12	Chen Wei	(China)	14 February 1998 (age 28)	(China) Shanghai Port U21		
53	Li Zhiliang	(China)	18 June 2007 (age 19)	(China) Shanghai Port U19		2026
55	Zhang Yuhang	(China)	18 September 2006 (age 20)	(China) Shanghai Port U21		
Defenders
3	Tyias Browning	(China) (England)	27 May 1994 (age 32)	(China) Guangzhou		2026
4	Wang Shenchao	(China)	8 February 1989 (age 37)	(China) Genbao Football Academy		2026
5	Zhang Linpeng	(China)	9 May 1989 (age 37)	(China) Guangzhou		2026
13	Wei Zhen	(China)	12 February 1997 (age 29)	(China) Shanghai Port U21		
19	Wang Zhen'ao	(China)	1 August 1999 (age 27)	(China) Dalian Professional		
22	Alex Yang	(China) (Spain)	13 June 2005 (age 21)	(China) Qingdao West Coast	2026	
23	Fu Huan	(China)	12 July 1993 (age 33)	(China) Nanjing City		
28	Yue Xin	(China)	10 November 1995 (age 31)	(China) Zhejiang		2026
31	Bao Shimeng	(China)	2 July 2003 (age 23)	(China) Suzhou Dongwu		2026
32	Li Shuai	(China)	18 June 1995 (age 31)	(China) Dalian Professional		
40	Umidjan Yusup	(China)	28 February 2004 (age 22)	(China) Wuhan Three Towns		
41	Wang Jinglei	(China)	19 March 2007 (age 19)	(China) Shanghai Port U19		
44	Miguel Campos	(Portugal)	19 August 1996 (age 30)	(Ukraine) Oleksandriya		
54	Wang Dongcheng	(China)	22 November 2007 (age 19)	(China) Shanghai Port U21		
Midfielders
6	Zhang Yuan	(China)	28 January 1997 (age 29)	(China) Beijing Guoan		
8	Kodjo Aziangbe	(Togo)	14 December 2003 (age 22)	(Japan) Yokohama F. Marinos	2026	2026
10	Mateus Vital	(Brazil)	12 February 1998 (age 28)	(Brazil) Cruzeiro		2026
16	Jaume Grau	(Spain)	5 May 1997 (age 29)	(China) Tianjin Jinmen Tiger		
18	Afrden Asqer	(China)	15 September 2003 (age 23)	(China) Guangzhou		
20	Yang Shiyuan	(China)	11 March 1994 (age 32)	(China) Suzhou Dongwu		
38	Lu Yongtao	(China)	12 January 2000 (age 26)	(China) Shandong Taishan		
47	Kuai Jiwen	(China)	28 February 2006 (age 20)	(China) Genbao Football Academy		
Striker
7	Wu Lei	(China)	19 November 1991 (age 35)	(Spain) Espanyol		2026
14	Matt Orr	(Hong Kong) (New Zealand)	1 January 1997 (age 29)	(China) Shenzhen Peng City		
17	Prince Ampem	(Ghana)	13 April 1998 (age 28)	(Turkey) Eyüpspor		
21	Óscar Melendo	(Spain)	23 August 1997 (age 29)	(Spain) Cádiz		2026
26	Liu Ruofan	(China)	28 January 1999 (age 27)	(China) Wuhan Three Towns		2026
33	Liu Zhurun	(China)	6 October 2001 (age 25)	(China) Dalian Yingbo		2026
45	Leonardo	(Brazil)	28 May 1997 (age 29)	(China) Zhejiang		2026
49	Li Xinxiang	(China)	30 November 2005 (age 20)	(China) Shanghai Port U21		
Players who left on loan
51	Wang Yiwei	(China)	20 March 2004 (age 22)	(China) Shanghai Port U21		
52	Meng Jingchao	(China)	9 January 2004 (age 22)	(China) Shanghai Port U21		
Players who left mid-season permanently

== Transfer ==
=== Pre-season ===
==== In ====
Transfers in

Date	Position	Player	Transferred from	Ref
Permanent Transfer
1 January 2026	DF	(China) He Guan	(China) Wuhan Three Towns	End of loan
1 January 2026	DF	(China) Xiang Rongjun	(China) Guangxi Pingguo (C3)	End of loan
1 January 2026	MF	(China) Chen Xuhuang	(China) Meizhou Hakka (C2)	End of loan
1 January 2026	FW	(China) Li Haoran	(China) Nantong Zhiyun (C2)	End of loan
1 January 2026	FW	(China) Liu Xiaolong	(China) Qingdao West Coast	End of loan
1 January 2026	FW	(China) Liu Zhurun	(China) Dalian Yingbo	End of loan
1 January 2026	FW	(China) Afrden Asqer	(China) Changchun Yatai (C2)	End of loan
19 January 2026	DF	(China) Yue Xin	(China) Zhejiang	Free
19 January 2026	MF	(China) Lu Yongtao	(China) Shandong Taishan	Free
19 January 2026	MF	(China) Zhang Yuan	(China) Beijing Guoan	Free
19 January 2026	FW	(Hong Kong) (New Zealand) Matt Orr	(China) Shenzhen Peng City	Free
31 January 2026	FW	(Brazil) Gabrielzinho	(Portugal) Moreirense	Free
5 February 2026	DF	(China) (Spain) Alex Yang	(China) Qingdao West Coast	Free
Loan Transfer
9 January 2026	MF	(Togo) Kodjo Aziangbe	(Japan) Yokohama F. Marinos	Season loan
26 February 2026	MF	(Ghana) Prince Ampem	(Turkey) Eyüpspor	Season loan

==== Out ====
Transfers out

Date	Position	Player	Transferred from	Ref
Permanent Transfer
1 January 2026	DF	(China) Li Ang	(China) Dalian Yingbo	Free
1 January 2026	DF	(China) He Guan	(China) Wuhan Three Towns	Free
1 January 2026	DF	(Hong Kong) (England) (Sweden) Alexander Jojo	(China) Chengdu Rongcheng	Free
1 January 2026	MF	(China) Ablahan Haliq	(China) Henan	Free
5 January 2026	DF	(China) Xu Xin	(China) Yunnan Yukun	Free
7 January 2026	MF	(Brazil) Matheus Jussal	(China) Chengdu Rongcheng	Free
8 January 2026	FW	(China) Li Shenglong	(China) Shanghai Port B	Free
15 January 2026	MF	(China) Chen Xuhuang	(China) Changchun Yatai (C2)	Free
15 January 2026	FW	(China) Li Haoran	(China) Liaoning Tieren (C2)	Undisclosed
16 January 2026	MF	(China) Lü Wenjun	Retired	N.A.
18 January 2026	FW	(China) Feng Jin	(China) Chongqing Tonglianglong	Free
19 February 2026	DF	(China) Ming Tian	(China) Wuhan Three Towns	Undisclosed
20 February 2026	FW	(China) Feng Jin	(China) Dalian Yingbo	Free
21 February 2026	FW	(Brazil) Gustavo	(China) Henan	Free
6 March 2026	DF	(China) Xiang Rongjun	(China) Nanjing City	Undisclosed
Loan Transfer
31 December 2025	FW	(Brazil) Gabrielzinho	(Portugal) Moreirense	End of loan
7 February 2026	GK	(China) Du Jia	(China) Jiangxi Dingnan United	Free
27 February 2026	MF	(China) Meng Jingchao	(China) Qingdao West Coast	Season loan

=== Mid-season ===
==== In ====
Transfers in

Date	Position	Player	Transferred from	Ref
Permanent Transfer
23 July 2026	DF	(Portugal) Miguel Campos	(Ukraine) Oleksandriya	Free
Loan Transfer
23 July 2026	MF	(Spain) Jaume Grau	(China) Tianjin Jinmen Tiger	Season loan

== Friendlies ==
=== Pre-Season Friendly ===
Win Draw Loss

=== Tour of Qatar (11 Jan - 2 Feb) ===
22 January 2025 1	Shanghai Port (China)	1–4	(Russia) Zenit Saint Petersburg	Doha, Qatar
				Stadium: Aspire Stadium

26 January 2025 2	Shanghai Port (China)	0–6	(Russia) Zenit Saint Petersburg	Doha, Qatar
			Andrey Mostovoy 19'; 44'; 51'; 56', 74'; 84'	Stadium: Khalifa Stadium

== Statistics ==
=== Appearances and goals ===
As of 21 November 26

No.	Nat.	Name	Chinese Super League		Chinese FA Cup		Chinese FA Super Cup		2025–26 AFC Champions League		2026–27 AFC Champions League		Total	
No.	Nat.	Name	Apps.	Goals	Apps.	Goals	Apps.	Goals	Apps.	Goals	Apps.	Goals	Apps.	Goals
1	GK	(China) Yan Junling	30	0	2	0	1	0	2	0	4	0	39	0
3	DF	(China) (England) Tyias Browning	12+5	1	2	0	0	0	0	0	3	0	22	1
4	DF	(China) Wang Shenchao	3+12	1	1+1	0	0	0	0	0	0	0	17	1
5	DF	(China) Zhang Linpeng	4+8	0	1+2	1	0	0	0+1	0	1	0	17	1
6	MF	(China) Zhang Yuan	8+6	1	1	0	0	0	0+2	0	0+1	0	18	1
7	FW	(China) Wu Lei	4+20	6	1+1	1	0+1	0	0	0	3	1	30	9
8	MF	(Togo) Kodjo Aziangbe	14+2	2	2+1	1	1	0	2	0	0+3	0	25	3
10	MF	(Brazil) Mateus Vital	29+1	2	3	1	1	0	2	0	3+1	0	40	3
11	FW	(Brazil) Gabrielzinho	5	2	0	0	1	0	1+1	0	0	0	8	2
12	GK	(China) Chen Wei	0	0	2	0	0	0	0	0	0	0	2	0
13	DF	(China) Wei Zhen	29	4	3+1	0	1	0	1	0	3	0	38	4
14	FW	(Hong Kong) (New Zealand) Matt Orr	2+4	1	0	0	1	0	2	0	0	0	9	1
16	MF	(Spain) Jaume Grau	0	0	0	0	0	0	0	0	4	1	4	1
17	FW	(Ghana) Prince Ampem	21+3	7	3	1	1	0	0	0	4	6	32	14
19	DF	(China) Wang Zhen'ao	5+8	0	1+2	0	0	0	0	0	2	0	18	0
20	MF	(China) Yang Shiyuan	0+4	0	0	0	0	0	0	0	0	0	4	0
21	MF	(Spain) Óscar Melendo	15	1	3	0	0	0	1	0	4	0	23	1
22	DF	(China) (Spain) Alex Yang	27+2	2	2+1	1	1	0	1	0	3	0	37	3
23	DF	(China) Fu Huan	4+6	0	0+2	0	0	0	0	0	0	0	12	0
26	FW	(China) Liu Ruofan	2+9	0	1	0	0	0	0	0	0	0	12	0
28	DF	(China) Yue Xin	6+11	1	2+1	0	0	0	0+1	0	1+1	0	23	1
31	DF	(China) Bao Shimeng	4+3	0	0	0	0	0	1	0	0	0	8	0
32	DF	(China) Li Shuai	16+7	1	3	0	1	0	2	0	2+1	0	32	1
33	FW	(China) Liu Zhurun	13+13	3	3+1	2	0+1	0	2	0	0+4	0	37	5
37	MF	(China) Zhang Junyang	0	0	0+1	0	0	0	0	0	0	0	1	0
38	MF	(China) Lu Yongtao	9+6	0	1+1	0	1	0	2	0	0	0	20	0
40	DF	(China) Umidjan Yusup	24+1	0	3	0	1	0	2	0	2+1	0	34	0
44	FW	(Portugal) Miguel Campos	0	0	0	0	0	0	0	0	3+1	1	4	1
45	FW	(Brazil) Leonardo	25+2	14	3	1	0+1	0	0	0	1+3	1	35	16
47	MF	(China) Kuai Jiwen	4+7	1	0+1	0	0+1	0	0+2	0	1	0	16	1
49	DF	(China) Li Xinxiang	14+12	5	0+3	0	0+1	0	0+2	0	0+2	1	34	5
52	MF	(China) Meng Jingchao	0	0	0	0	0	0	0+1	0	0	0	1	0
54	MF	(China) Wang Dongcheng	0	0	0+1	0	0	0	0	0	0	0	1	0
58	MF	(China) Cao Zhezhe	0	0	0+1	0	0	0	0	0	0	0	1	0
Players who have played this season and/or sign for the season but had left the club or on loan to other club

== Competitions ==
=== Chinese Super League ===
7 March 2026 1	Shanghai Port	1–2	Henan	Shanghai
	Gabrielzinho 45+5'; Kuai Jiwen (yellow card) 63'		Zhong Yihao 1'; Iago Maidana 16'; Huang Ruifeng (yellow card) 45+3'	Stadium: Pudong Football Stadium; Referee: Tang Shunqi

15 March 2026 2	Shanghai Port	4–1	Qingdao West Coast	Shanghai
	Kodjo Aziangbe 48'; Leonardo 62'; Wu Lei 72', 79' (yellow card) 90+5'		Fang Haiyang (yellow card) 58'; Ding Haifeng (yellow card) 65'; Wang Peng (yellow card) 85'	Stadium: Pudong Football Stadium; Referee: He Kai

20 March 2026 3	Dalian Yingbo	1–0	Shanghai Port	Dalian
	Frank Acheampong 48'; Bi Jinhao (yellow card) 58'; Lu Zhuoyi (yellow card) 65'	Report	Umidjan Yusup (yellow card) 23'; Liu Zhurun (yellow card) 83'	Stadium: Dalian Suoyuwan Football Stadium; Attendance: 58,337; Referee: Wang Jing

4 April 2026 4	Shanghai Port	2–1	Yunnan Yukun	Shanghai
	Leonardo 36'; Wang Shenchao 90+4' (yellow card) 90+1'; Lu Yongtao (yellow card) 43'; Liu Zhurun (yellow card) 45'		Andrei Burca 62'; Ye Chugui (yellow card) 33'; Zhang Chengliang (yellow card) 77'	Stadium: Pudong Football Stadium; Referee: Huang Yi

11 April 2026 5	Shanghai Shenhua	1–0	Shanghai Port	Shanghai
	Rafael Ratão 52'; Yang Haoyu (yellow card) 66'; Shinichi Chan (yellow card) 90+1'; Yang Zexiang (yellow card) 90+6'		Lu Yongtao (yellow card) 26'; Yang Shiyuan (yellow card) 71'	Stadium: Shanghai Stadium; Referee: Li Hai Xin

17 April 2026 6	Shandong Taishan	1–1	Shanghai Port	Jinan
	Cryzan 73'; Guilherme Madruga (yellow card) 28'; Pedro Alvaro (yellow card) 45+6'; Xie Wenneng (yellow card) 56'		Alex Yang 38'; Mateus Vital (yellow card) 21'; Umidjan Yusup (yellow card) 55'; Lu Yongtao (yellow card) 71'; Li Shuai (yellow card) 81'; Wang Shenchao (yellow card) 88'	Stadium: Jinan Olympic Sports Center Stadium; Referee: Liang Songshang

21 April 2026 7	Shanghai Port	1–2	Chongqing Tonglianglong	Shanghai
	Li Xinxiang 58'; Wang Shenchao (yellow card) 54'; Umidjan Yusup (yellow card) 85'		Michael Ngadeu-Ngadjui 15'; Chen Chunxin 45'; Li Zhenquan (yellow card) 33'; Ibrahim Amadou (yellow card) 60'; Lucão (yellow card) 67'	Stadium: Pudong Football Stadium; Referee: Zhang Lei

25 April 2026 8	Shanghai Port	4–0	Wuhan Three Towns	Shanghai
	Wei Zhen 17'; Prince Ampem 47'; Tyias Browning 59'; Liu Zhurun 78'		Jizheng Xiong (yellow card) 57'	Stadium: Pudong Football Stadium; Referee: Ai Kun

2 May 2026 9	Qingdao Hainiu	3–1	Shanghai Port	Qingdao
	Luo Senwen 9'; Yaw Yeboah 68'; Jin Yonghao 76'; Malcom Edjouma (yellow card) 57'		Alex Yang 48'; Umidjan Yusup (yellow card) 33' (yellow-red card) 64'; Bao Shimeng (yellow card) 54'; Wu Lei (yellow card) 87'	Stadium: Qingdao Youth Football Stadium; Referee: Zhu Wenbin

6 May 2026 10	Shanghai Port	1–1	Shenzhen Peng City	Shanghai
	Liu Zhurun 86'; Prince Ampem (red card) 90+8'		Tim Chow 63'; Jiang Zhipeng (yellow card) 43'	Stadium: Pudong Football Stadium; Referee: Ma Yunkun

10 May 2026 11	Beijing Guoan	2–2	Shanghai Port	Beijing
	Fabio Abreu 49'; Zhang Xizhe 85' (pen.) (yellow card) 90+1'		Mateus Vital 45' (pen.); Leonardo 63' (yellow card) 32'; Li Xinxiang (yellow card) 45+4'; Yuan Zhang (yellow card) 69'; Wang Zhenao (yellow card) 77'	Stadium: Workers' Stadium; Referee: Ma Ning

15 May 2026 12	Shanghai Port	2–2	Zhejiang	Shanghai
	Mateus Vital 21'; Yuan Zhang 80'; Wang Zhenao (yellow card) 12'; Alex Yang (yellow card) 24'; Liu Zhurun (yellow card) 33'		Wang Yudong 27'; Gao Di 55'; Tao Qianglong (yellow card) 68'; Wu Wei (yellow card) 78'; Saul Guarirapa (yellow card) 79'; Lucas (yellow card) 86'	Stadium: Pudong Football Stadium; Referee: Shan Dan'ao

19 May 2026 13	Chengdu Rongcheng	0–1	Shanghai Port	Chengdu
	Egor Sorokin (yellow card) 60'; Wei Shihao (yellow card) 82'; Gan Chao (yellow card) 90+1'		Li Xinxiang 69'; Bao Shimeng (yellow card) 42'; Yan Junling (yellow card) 64'; Lu Yongtao (yellow card) 66'; Wei Zhen (yellow card) 71'; Alex Yang (yellow card) 73'; Yue Xin (yellow card) 76'; Zhang Yuan (yellow card) 90+4'; Yang Shiyuan (yellow card) 90+5'; Li Shuai (yellow card) 90+9'	Stadium: Phoenix Hill Football Stadium; Referee: Li Hai Xin

23 May 2026 14	Shanghai Port	1–1	Tianjin Jinmen Tiger	Shanghai
	Leonardo 52'		Xadas 77' (pen.); Jaume Grau (yellow card) 88'	Stadium: Pudong Football Stadium; Referee: Zhang Cao

29 May 2026 15	Liaoning Tieren	3–2	Shanghai Port	Shenyang
	Takahiro Kunimoto 9'; Guy Mbenza 69'; Jeffinho 85' (yellow card) 1' (yellow-red card)		Li Shuai 19'; Leonardo 84'; Wei Zhen (yellow card) 52'; Yuan Zhang (yellow card) 60'; Lu Yongtao (yellow card) 61'	Stadium: Tiexi Stadium; Referee: Ren Tong

27 June 2026 16	Henan	1–2	Shanghai Port	Zhengzhou
	Bruno Nazario 8'; Yang Yilin (yellow card) 33'; Zhong Yihao (yellow card) 50'		Li Xinxiang 16'; Kodjo Aziangbe 56'; Mateus Vital (yellow card) 26'; Umidjan Yusup (yellow card) 35'	Stadium: Hanghai Stadium

4 July 2026 17	Qingdao West Coast	2–1	Shanghai Port	Qingdao
	Nelson Da Luz 84'; Davidson 90'; Wang Peng (yellow card) 90+10'		Matt Orr 90+10'; Zhang Yuan (red card) 31'; Li Xinxiang (yellow card) 47'; Alex Yang (yellow card) 87'	Stadium: Qingdao West Coast University City Sports Center; Referee: Wan Tao

19 August 2026 18 (Rescheduled)	Shanghai Port	1–1	Dalian Yingbo	Shanghai
	Li Xinxiang 90'; Yan Junling (yellow card) 16'; Wei Zhen (yellow card) 26' (penalty missed) 87		Nicolae Stanciu 22' (pen.); Pedro Delgado (yellow card) 40' (yellow-red card); Song Yue (yellow card) 68'	Stadium: Pudong Football Stadium

17 July 2026 19	Yunnan Yukun	2–2	Shanghai Port	Yuxi
	Oscar Maritu 49'; Bunyamin Abdusalam 53'; Huang Zichang (yellow card) 11'; Wang Kit Tsui (yellow card) 90+3'		Wei Zhen 37'; Xin Yue 40'	Stadium: Yuxi Plateau Sports Center Stadium; Referee: Jin Jingyuan

25 July 2026 20	Shanghai Port	2–0	Shanghai Shenhua	Shanghai
	Leonardo 28'; Li Xinxiang 36'; Kodjo Aziangbe (yellow card) 18'; Wang Zhenao (yellow card) 90+2'		Yang Zexiang (yellow card) 90+3'	Stadium: Pudong Football Stadium

1 August 2026 21	Shanghai Port	0–1	Shandong Taishan	Shanghai
	Mateus Vital (penalty missed) 78; Kodjo Aziangbe (yellow card) 18'; Wei Zhen (yellow card) 45+8'; Umidjan Yusup (yellow card) 85'		Zeca 5'; Chen Pu (yellow card) 15'; Huang Zhengyu (yellow card) 45+7' (yellow-red card)	Stadium: Pudong Football Stadium

9 August 2026 22	Chongqing Tonglianglong	2–3	Shanghai Port	Chongqing
	Xiang Yuwang 19' (pen.) (yellow card) 24'; Michael Ngadeu 45+11'; Li Zhenquan (yellow card) 21'; Wu Yongqiang (yellow card) 90'		Leonardo 29', 51'; Wei Zhen 39'	Stadium: Tongliang Long Stadium

14 August 2026 23	Wuhan Three Towns	2–3	Shanghai Port	Wuhan
	Jhonder Cadiz 3'; Antoine Leautey 75' (yellow card) 71'; Zhang Xiaobin (yellow card) 46'; Li Ang (yellow card) 66'		Wei Zhen 50'; Prince Ampem 55', 59'; Umidjan Yusup (yellow card) 12'; Fu Huan (yellow card) 42'; Leonardo (yellow card) 65'	Stadium: Wuhan Sports Center

23 August 2026 24	Shanghai Port	2–1	Qingdao Hainiu	Shanghai
	Wu Lei 44', 67' (pen.); Oscar Melendo (yellow card) 60'		Carlos Strandberg 17'; Yaw Yeboah (yellow card) 50'; Liu Junshuai (yellow card) 66'; Liu Guobao (yellow card) 90'	Stadium: Pudong Football Stadium

28 August 2026 25	Shenzhen Peng City	0–1	Shanghai Port	Shenzhen
	Gabriel Xavier (yellow card) 43'; Li Ning (yellow card) 90+8'		Kuai Jiwen 81'; Wang Zhenao (yellow card) 8'	Stadium: Shenzhen Sports Center Stadium

5 September 2026 26	Shanghai Port	0–0	Beijing Guo'an	Shanghai
			Yun Wang (yellow card) 35'	Stadium: Pudong Football Stadium

9 October 2026 27	Zhejiang	2–4	Shanghai Port	Hangzhou
	Alex Yang 6' (o.g.); Alexandru Mitrita 72' (pen.) (yellow card) 54'; Marko Tolić (penalty missed) 52 (yellow card) 90+7'; Park Jin-seob (yellow card) 31'		Oscar Melendo 13'; Prince Ampem 18'; Liu Zhurun 47'; Leonardo 56'; Wei Zhen (yellow card) 5'; Alex Yang (yellow card) 50'; Umidjan Yusup (yellow card) 53'; Kevin Muscat (yellow card) 68'	Stadium: Huanglong Sports Center Stadium; Referee: Xin He

18 October 2026 28	Shanghai Port	3–0	Chengdu Rongcheng	Shanghai
	Wang Dongsheng 57' (o.g.); Leonardo 83'; Wu Lei 90+4'; Oscar Melendo (yellow card) 54'; Tyias Browning (yellow card) 55'; Yan Junling (yellow card) 89'; Li Xinxiang (yellow card) 90+4'		Matheus Jussa (yellow card) 59'	Stadium: Pudong Football Stadium

24 October 2026 29	Tianjin Jinmen Tiger	1–3	Shanghai Port	Tianjin
	Sun Ming Him 73'; Xie Weijun (yellow card) 19'; Cristian Salvador (yellow card) 37'		Prince Ampem 45'; Leonardo 53' (pen.), 87' (yellow card) 72'; Alex Yang (yellow card) 43'; Yue Xin (red card) 56'; Liu Zhurun (yellow card) 62'; Wei Zhen (yellow card) 70'	Stadium: TEDA Soccer Stadium

8 November 2026 30	Shanghai Port	6–1	Liaoning Tieren	Shanghai
	Prince Ampem 30', 87'; Leonardo 44', 45+1'; Wu Xi 60' (pen.), 66'		Chen Binbin 72'; Wang Tianai (yellow card) 58'; Takahiro Kunimoto (yellow card) 85'; Jeffinho (yellow card) 86'	Stadium: Pudong Football Stadium

Pos	Team	Pld	W	D	L	GF	GA	GD	Pts
3	Beijing Guoan (Note: Beijing Guoan had 5 points deducted for violation of sports ethics and loss of sportsmanship, engaging in improper transactions to seek illegitimate benefits.)	30	15	10	5	58	36	+22	50
4	Shandong Taishan (Note: Shandong Taishan had 6 points deducted for violation of sports ethics and loss of sportsmanship, engaging in improper transactions to seek illegitimate benefits.)	30	16	5	9	60	49	+11	47
5	Shanghai Port (Note: Shanghai Port had 5 points deducted for violation of sports ethics and loss of sportsmanship, engaging in improper transactions to seek illegitimate benefits.)	30	14	8	8	56	37	+19	45
6	Yunnan Yukun	30	12	7	11	59	61	−2	43
7	Shanghai Shenhua (Note: Shanghai Shenhua had 10 points deducted for violation of sports ethics and loss of sportsmanship, engaging in improper transactions to seek illegitimate benefits.)	30	15	5	10	67	50	+17	40

Source: Soccerway
Rules for classification:
- During season: 1) Points; 2) Head-to-head points; 3) Head-to-head goal difference; 4) Head-to-head goals scored; 5) Goal difference; 6) Goals scored; 7) Rankings in the previous season. (Rules 2 to 4 are only applied when teams concerned have finished both/all the matches against others.)
- After season: 1) Points; 2) Head-to-head points; 3) Head-to-head goal difference; 4) Head-to-head goals scored; 5) Goal difference; 6) Goals scored; 7) Disciplinary points (yellow card = 1 point, red card = 3 points); 8) Drawing of lots.
  Notes:

=== Chinese FA Cup ===
19 June 2026 Round 4	Shanghai Second (3)	1–2	Shanghai Port	Shanghai
15:30 UTC+8	Liu Wenjie 90+7'		Liu Zhurun 59'; Zhang Lingpeng 37'	Stadium: Lingang Football Complex Sports Center

21 July 2026 Round 5	Shanghai Port	1–1 (a.e.t.) (4–3 p)	Shenzhen Peng City	Shanghai
	Jean Claude 45+2'; Umidjan Yusup (yellow card) 83'; Chen Wei (yellow card) 90+1'		Wesley Moraes 57'; Zhang Yufeng (yellow card) 85'; Jiang Zhipeng (red card) 90+4'; Tang Miao (yellow card) 103'	Stadium: Pudong Football Stadium
	Penalties
	Wu Lei (penalty scored); Leonardo (penalty missed); Wei Zhen (penalty scored); Li Xinxiang (penalty scored); Wei Chen (penalty missed); Liu Zhurun (penalty scored)		Tim Chow (penalty missed); Xia Dalong (penalty scored); Li Ning (penalty scored); Zhang Yufeng (penalty missed); Wesley Moraes (penalty scored); Gabriel Xavier (penalty missed)

1 September 2026 Quarter Final	Shandong Taishan	0–3	Shanghai Port	Jinan
	Cryzan (yellow card) 71'		Liu Zhurun 19'; Prince Ampem 22'; Xi Yang 79'	Stadium: Jinan Olympic Sports Center Stadium

20 November 2026 Semi Final	Beijing Guoan	0–2	Shanghai Port	Beijing
	Gang Wang (red card) 29'; Zhang Yuning (yellow card) 33'		Wu Lei 30' (pen.); Mateus Vital 59'; Alex Yang (yellow card) 19'; Yusup Umidjan (yellow card) 45'	Stadium: Workers' Stadium

6 December 2026 Final	Shanghai Port	–	Yunnan Yukun	Suzhou
				Stadium: Suzhou Olympic Sports Centre

=== Chinese FA Super Cup ===
1 March 2026	Shanghai Port	0–2	Beijing Guoan	Nanjing
15:30 UTC+8	Alex Yang (yellow card) 30'; Liu Zhurun (yellow card) 90+3'; Leonardo (yellow card) 90+6'		Dawhan 31'; Cao Yongjing 84'; Abduhamit Abdugheni (yellow card) 20'; Guilherme Ramos (yellow card) 27'; Zhang Yuning (yellow card) 40'; Yang Liyu (yellow card) 60'	Stadium: Nanjing Olympic Sports Centre

=== 2025–26 AFC Champions League Elite ===
==== League stage ====
17 September 2025 MD 1	Shanghai Port (China)	0–3	(Japan) Vissel Kobe	Shanghai, China
	Zhang Linpeng (yellow card) 89'	Report	Erik 19'; Taisei Miyashiro 40'; Yuya Osako 44'	Stadium: Pudong Football Stadium; Attendance: 12,966; Referee: Choi Hyun-jai (South Korea)

30 September 2025 MD 2	Sanfrecce Hiroshima (Japan)	1–1	(China) Shanghai Port	Sanfrecce, Japan
	Hayato Araki 19'; Tsukasa Shiotani (yellow card) 16'; Kim Ju-sung (yellow card) 55'		Gabrielzinho 83'; Alexander Jojo (yellow card) 77'; Gustavo (red card) 90'	Stadium: Edion Peace Wing Hiroshima; Attendance: 7,819; Referee: Alex King (Australia)

21 October 2025 MD 3	Shanghai Port (China)	0–2	(Japan) FC Machida Zelvia	Shanghai, China
	Matheus Jussa (yellow card) 88'	Report	Fu Huan 12' (o.g.); Yuki Soma 25' (yellow card) 48'	Stadium: Pudong Football Stadium; Attendance: 2,018; Referee: Ahmed Issa (United Arab Emirates)

4 November 2025 MD 4	Buriram United (Thailand)	2–0	(China) Shanghai Port	Buriram, Thailand
	Supachai Chaided 15'; Curtis Good 65'	Report		Stadium: Chang Arena; Attendance: 14,161; Referee: Asker Nadjafaliev (Uzbekistan)

25 November 2025 MD 5	Shanghai Port (China)	1–3	(South Korea) FC Seoul	Shanghai, China
	Mateus Vital 61'; Lyu Wenjun (yellow card) 30'; Zhang Linpeng (yellow card) 86'	Report	Jesse Lingard 47', 77' (yellow card) 86'; Lucas Silva 67'; Lee Seung-Mo (yellow card) 56'	Stadium: Pudong Football Stadium; Attendance: 11,501; Referee: Khaled Al-Hoish (Saudi Arabia)

9 December 2025 MD 6	Johor Darul Ta'zim (Malaysia)	0–0	(China) Shanghai Port	Johor, Malaysia
	Antonio Glauder (yellow card) 30'	Report	Yang Shiyuan (yellow card) 47'; Zhang Linpeng (yellow card) 52'; Fu Huan (yellow card) 90+7'	Stadium: Sultan Ibrahim Stadium; Attendance: 19,760; Referee: Shaun Evans (Australia)

11 February 2026 MD 7	Gangwon FC (South Korea)	0–0	(China) Shanghai Port	Gangneung, South Korea
		Report	Umidjan Yusup (yellow card) 26'	Stadium: Gangneung Stadium; Attendance: 2,527; Referee: Ahmed Al-Kaf (Oman)

18 February 2026 MD 8	Shanghai Port (China)	0–0	(South Korea) Ulsan HD FC	Shanghai, China
	Alex Yang (yellow card) 30'	Report	Cho Hyun-taek (yellow card) 70'	Stadium: Pudong Football Stadium; Referee: Adel Al-Naqbi (United Arab Emirates)

Pos	Team	Pld	W	D	L	GF	GA	GD	Pts	Qualification
8	(South Korea) Gangwon FC	8	2	3	3	9	11	−2	9	Advance to round of 16
9	(South Korea) Ulsan HD	8	2	3	3	6	8	−2	9	
10	(China) Chengdu Rongcheng	8	1	3	4	7	11	−4	6	
11	(China) Shanghai Shenhua	8	1	1	6	5	13	−8	4	
12	(China) Shanghai Port	8	0	4	4	2	11	−9	4	

Source: AFC
Rules for classification: 1) points; 2) goal difference; 3) number of goals scored; 4) number of matches won; 5) penalty shoot-out if only two teams remain tied and played each other on the final matchday 6) fair play ranking; 7) drawing of lots

=== 2026–27 AFC Champions League Elite ===
==== League stage ====
Win Draw Loss

Pos	Team	Pld	W	D	L	GF	GA	GD	Pts	Qualification
3	(Japan) Gamba Osaka	4	2	2	0	11	6	+5	8	Advance to round of 16
4	(Japan) Kashiwa Reysol	4	2	1	1	8	3	+5	7	Advance to round of 16
5	(China) Shanghai Port	4	2	1	1	13	10	+3	7	Advance to round of 16
6	(Japan) Kyoto Sanga	4	2	1	1	6	3	+3	7	Advance to round of 16
6	(Malaysia) Johor Darul Ta'zim	4	2	1	1	6	3	+3	7	Advance to round of 16

Updated to match(es) played on 4 November 2026. Source: AFC
Rules for classification: 1) points; 2) goal difference; 3) number of goals scored; 4) number of matches won; 5) penalty shoot-out if only two teams remain tied and played each other on the final matchday 6) fair play ranking; 7) drawing of lots

15 September 2026 1	Ratchaburi (Thailand)	4–6	(China) Shanghai Port	Ratchaburi, Thailand
	Njiva Rakotoharimalala 71', 84', 90+5'; Ekanit Panya 90+6'; Roque Mesa (yellow card) 75'; Thossawat Limwannasathian (yellow card) 77'	Report	Prince Ampem 31', 36', 45+1'; Wu Lei 51'; Jaume Grau 86'; Ekanit Panya 90+7'; Miguel Campos (yellow card) 39'	Stadium: Ratchaburi Stadium; Attendance: 2,974; Referee: Kim Jong-hyeok (South Korea)

13 October 2026 2	Shanghai Port (China)	1–1	(South Korea) Daejeon Hana Citizen	Shanghai, China
	Prince Ampem 49'; Wei Zhen (yellow card) 46'	Report	Diogo de Oliveira 54'; João Victor (yellow card) 45'; Park Kyu-hyun (yellow card) 60'	Stadium: Pudong Football Stadium; Attendance: 12,013; Referee: Mohammed Al-Hoish (Saudi Arabia)

27 October 2026 3	Shanghai Port (China)	2–3	(Vietnam) Công An Hà Nội	Shanghai, China
	Prince Ampem 44'; Miguel Campos 60'; Mateus Vital (penalty missed) 81'	Report	Brayan Perea 35', 69'; Léo Artur 49'; Frans Putros (yellow card) 37'; Stefan Mauk (yellow card) 47'; Lê Văn Đô (yellow card) 57'	Stadium: Pudong Football Stadium; Attendance: 10,399; Referee: Choi Hyun-jai (South Korea)

4 November 2026 4	Newcastle Jets (Australia)	2–4	(China) Shanghai Port	Newcastle, Australia
	Patrick Wood 58' (yellow card) 64'; Xavier Bertoncello 80'		Leonardo 24'; Thomas Aquilina 26' (o.g.); Prince Ampem 51'; Li Xinxiang 86'; Jaume Grau (yellow card) 64'; Li Shuai (yellow card) 75'	Stadium: McDonald Jones Stadium; Attendance: 1,614; Referee: Omar Al-Ali (United Arab Emirates)

24 November 2026 5	Shanghai Port (China)	–	(Thailand) Buriram United	Shanghai, China
				Stadium: Pudong Football Stadium

1 December 2026 6	Pohang Steelers (South Korea)	–	(China) Shanghai Port	Pohang, South Korea
				Stadium: Pohang Steel Yard

9 February 2027 7	Shanghai Port (China)	–	(Thailand) Port	Shanghai, China
				Stadium: Pudong Football Stadium

16 February 2027 8	Jeonbuk Hyundai Motors (South Korea)	–	(China) Shanghai Port	Jeonju, South Korea
				Stadium: Jeonju World Cup Stadium
