= 2025 Shanghai Port F.C. season =

Shanghai Port
2025 season
- Manager: (Australia) Kevin Muscat
- Stadium: Pudong Football Stadium
- Top goalscorer: League: Leonardo (20 goals); All: Leonardo (21 goals)
- Average home league attendance: 19,380
Home colours	Away colours

The 2025 Shanghai Port F.C. season is the 20th season in the club's history. During this season, the club will participate in the following competitions: Chinese Super League, FA Cup, AFC Champions League Elite & AFC Champions League Elite.

== Squad ==
As of 24 Feb 2025

No.	Name	Nationality	Date of birth (age)	Previous club	Contract since	Contract end
Goalkeepers
1	Yan Junling	(China)	28 January 1991 (age 35)	(China) Genbao Football Academy		
12	Chen Wei	(China)	14 February 1998 (age 28)	(China) Shanghai Port U21		
25	Du Jia	(China)	1 May 1993 (age 33)	(China) Tianjin Teda		
53	Li Zhiliang	(China)	18 June 2007 (age 19)	(China) Shanghai Port U18		
Defenders
2	Li Ang	(China)	15 September 1993 (age 33)	(China) Jiangsu Suning		
3	Tyias Browning	(China) (England)	27 May 1994 (age 32)	(China) Guangzhou		
4	Wang Shenchao	(China)	8 February 1989 (age 37)	(China) Genbao Football Academy		
5	Zhang Linpeng	(China)	9 May 1989 (age 37)	(China) Guangzhou		
13	Wei Zhen	(China)	12 February 1997 (age 29)	(China) Shanghai Port U21		
15	Ming Tian	(China)	8 April 1995 (age 31)	(China) Tianjin Teda		
19	Wang Zhen'ao	(China)	1 August 1999 (age 27)	(China) Dalian Professional		
23	Fu Huan	(China)	12 July 1993 (age 33)	(China) Nanjing City		
29	Alexander Jojo	(Hong Kong) (England) (Sweden)	11 February 1999 (age 27)	(Hong Kong) Eastern	2025	2026
32	Li Shuai	(China)	18 June 1995 (age 31)	(China) Dalian Professional		
40	Umidjan Yusup	(China)	28 February 2004 (age 22)	(China) Wuhan Three Towns		
41	Wang Jinglei	(China)	19 March 2007 (age 19)	(China) Shanghai Port U18		
51	Wang Yiwei	(China)	20 March 2004 (age 22)	(China) Shanghai Port U21		
Midfielders
6	Xu Xin	(China)	19 April 1994 (age 32)	(China) Shandong Taishan		
10	Mateus Vital	(Brazil)	12 February 1998 (age 28)	(Brazil) Cruzeiro		
20	Yang Shiyuan	(China)	11 March 1994 (age 32)	(China) Suzhou Dongwu		
22	Matheus Jussa	(Brazil)	22 March 1996 (age 30)	(Brazil) Fortaleza		
36	Ablahan Haliq	(China)	26 April 2001 (age 25)	(China) Wuhan Three Towns		
47	Kuai Jiwen	(China)	28 February 2006 (age 20)	(China) Genbao Football Academy		
52	Meng Jingchao	(China)	9 January 2004 (age 22)	(China) Shanghai Port U21		
Striker
7	Wu Lei	(China)	19 November 1991 (age 34)	(Spain) Espanyol		
9	Gustavo	(Brazil)	29 March 1994 (age 32)	(South Korea) Jeonbuk Hyundai Motors		
11	Lü Wenjun	(China)	11 March 1989 (age 37)	(China) Genbao Football Academy		
14	Li Shenglong	(China)	30 July 1992 (age 34)	(China) Shanghai Zobon		
21	Óscar Melendo	(Spain)	23 August 1997 (age 29)	(Spain) Cádiz		
26	Liu Ruofan	(China)	28 January 1999 (age 27)	(China) Wuhan Three Towns		
27	Feng Jin	(China)	14 August 1993 (age 33)	(China) Qingdao Hainiu		
30	Gabrielzinho	(Brazil)	29 March 1996 (age 30)	(Portugal) Moreirense		
45	Leonardo	(Brazil)	28 May 1997 (age 29)	(China) Zhejiang		
49	Li Xinxiang	(China)	30 November 2005 (age 20)	(China) Shanghai Port U21		
Players who left mid-season on loan
18	Afrden Asqer	(China)	15 September 2003 (age 23)	(China) Guangzhou		
Players who left mid-season permanently
17	Will Donkin	(Chinese Taipei) (England)	26 December 2000 (age 25)	(China) Shenzhen		

== Transfer ==
=== In ===
Pre-Season

Position	Player	Transferred from	Ref
DF	(China) Umidjan Yusup	(China) Wuhan Three Towns	Free
DF	(China) Ming Tian	(China) Tianjin Teda	Free
FW	(China) Afrden Asqer	(China) Guangzhou	Free
FW	(China) Liu Ruofan	(China) Wuhan Three Towns	Free
FW	(Brazil) Mateus Vital	(Brazil) Cruzeiro	Undisclosed
FW	(Brazil) Leonardo	(China) Shandong Taishan	Undisclosed
FW	(Brazil) Gabrielzinho	(Portugal) Moreirense	Season loan

Mid-Season

Position	Player	Transferred from	Ref
DF	(Hong Kong) (England) (Sweden) Alexander Jojo	(Norway) IK Oddevold	Undisclosed
MF	(Spain) Óscar Melendo	(Spain) Cádiz	Free

=== Out ===
Pre-Season

Position	Player	Transferred To	Ref
DF	(China) Li Shenyuan	(China) Changchun Yatai F.C.	Free
MF	(China) Lei Wenjie	(China) Dalian K'un City	Free
FW	(Brazil) Oscar	(Brazil) São Paulo FC	Free
FW	(Argentina) Matías Vargas	(Saudi Arabia) Al Fateh SC	Free

Mid-Season

Position	Player	Transferred To	Ref
MF	(Chinese Taipei) (England) Will Donkin	(China) Wuhan Three Towns	Undisclosed
FW	(China) Afrden Asqer	(China) Changchun Yatai	Season loan

== Friendlies ==
=== Pre-Season Friendly ===
Win Draw Loss

15 January 2025 1	Shanghai Port (China)	0–1	(Romania) FC Rapid București	Dubai, UAE
				Stadium: Jebel Ali Centre of Excellence

20 January 2025 2	Shanghai Port (China)	2–1	(Russia) FC Lokomotiv Moscow	Abu Dhabi, UAE
				Stadium: Zayed Cricket Stadium Pitch 5

== Statistics ==
=== Appearances and goals ===
As of 9 Dec 2025

No.	Nat.	Name	Chinese Super League		Chinese FA Cup		Chinese FA Super Cup		2024–25 AFC Champions League		2025–26 AFC Champions League		Total	
No.	Nat.	Name	Apps.	Goals	Apps.	Goals	Apps.	Goals	Apps.	Goals	Apps.	Goals	Apps.	Goals
1	GK	(China) Yan Junling	27	0	1	0	1	0	4	0	2	0	35	0
2	DF	(China) Li Ang	2	0	0	0	1	0	4	0	0	0	7	0
3	DF	(China) Tyias Browning	21+1	0	2	0	1	0	4	0	3	0	32	0
4	DF	(China) Wang Shenchao	18+9	4	2	0	0	0	1+1	0	4	0	35	4
5	DF	(China) Zhang Linpeng	6+10	1	1	0	0+1	0	1+1	0	3+2	0	24	1
6	MF	(China) Xu Xin	9+7	1	1	0	0	0	4	0	0+2	0	23	1
7	FW	(China) Wu Lei	0+6	1	0	0	0	0	0	0	0	0	6	1
9	FW	(Brazil) Gustavo	10+3	7	1+1	3	1	0	4	0	2	0	22	10
10	MF	(Brazil) Mateus Vital	30	5	1	0	1	0	4	0	6	1	42	6
11	FW	(China) Lü Wenjun	0+5	0	0+1	0	0	0	0+4	0	1+3	0	14	0
12	GK	(China) Chen Wei	3+1	0	1	0	0	0	0	0	4	0	9	0
13	DF	(China) Wei Zhen	15+4	0	0	0	0	0	1	0	6	0	26	0
14	FW	(China) Li Shenglong	0+13	1	0+2	1	0	0	0	0	4	0	19	2
15	DF	(China) Ming Tian	11+2	0	0+2	0	0+1	0	2+1	0	1+1	0	21	0
19	DF	(China) Wang Zhen'ao	4	0	0	0	1	0	2+2	0	0	0	8	0
20	MF	(China) Yang Shiyuan	1+9	0	0+1	0	0	0	1+3	0	1+2	0	18	0
21	MF	(Spain) Óscar Melendo	13	1	0	0	0	0	0	0	5+1	0	19	1
22	MF	(Brazil) Matheus Jussal	28	2	2	1	1	0	3	0	6	0	40	3
23	DF	(China) Fu Huan	3+7	0	0	0	0	0	1	0	3+2	0	16	0
26	FW	(China) Liu Ruofan	19+6	5	0	0	0	0	0+1	0	0+1	0	27	5
27	FW	(China) Feng Jin	5+5	1	0+2	0	0	0	2+2	0	0+2	0	18	1
29	DF	(Hong Kong) (England) (Sweden) Alexander Jojo	0+7	0	0	0	0	0	0	0	4+2	0	13	0
30	FW	(Brazil) Gabrielzinho	24+2	10	2	2	1	2	1	0	1+2	1	32	15
32	DF	(China) Li Shuai	23+2	2	2	0	1	0	3+1	0	2+1	0	35	2
36	MF	(China) Ablahan Haliq	0+2	0	0	0	0	0	0+2	0	0+1	0	5	0
40	DF	(China) Umidjan Yusup	19+2	0	1	0	0	0	0	0	4+1	0	27	0
45	FW	(Brazil) Leonardo	28+2	20	1	0	0	0	4	1	0+2	0	36	21
47	MF	(China) Kuai Jiwen	4+13	0	2	1	0	0	0	0	2+1	0	22	1
49	DF	(China) Li Xinxiang	7+14	6	2	0	0	0	0+1	0	2	0	26	6
52	MF	(China) Meng Jingchao	0	0	0+1	0	0	0	0+1	0	0+1	0	3	0
Players who have played this season and/or sign for the season but had left the club or on loan to other club
17	FW	(Chinese Taipei) (England) Will Donkin	0+1	0	0	0	0	0	0	0	0	0	1	0
18	FW	(China) Afrden Asqer	0+1	0	0	0	0	0	0+2	0	0	0	3	0

== Competitions ==
=== Chinese Super League ===
22 February 2025 1	Shanghai Port	3–1	Shenzhen Peng City	Shanghai
	Matheus Jussal 3'; Gustavo 62', 90+3' (pen.); Wang Zhen'ao (yellow card) 27'; Xu Xin (yellow card) 86'; Wei Zhen (yellow card) 90+9'	Report	Matt Orr 80'; Tiago Leonço (yellow card) 30'; Zhang Xiaobin (yellow card) 76'; Jiang Zhipeng (yellow card) 83'	Stadium: Pudong Football Stadium; Attendance: 13,922; Referee: Ai Kun

28 February 2025 2	Shanghai Port	2–0	Changchun Yatai	Shanghai
	Feng Jin 54'; Leonardo 90+8'; Wang Zhen'ao (yellow card) 14'; Matheus Jussa (yellow card) 20'; Xu Xin (yellow card) 74'; Wei Zhen (yellow card) 90+5'	Report	Zhou Junchen (yellow card) 48'; Piao Taoyu (yellow card) 78'	Stadium: Pudong Football Stadium; Attendance: 11,369; Referee: Jin Jingyuan

28 March 2025 3	Qingdao West Coast	3–3	Shanghai Port	Qingdao
	Matheus Índio 9'; Abdul-Aziz Yakubu 19', 45+1'; Sun Jie (yellow card) 39'; Zhang Xiuwei (yellow card) 61'		Li Xinxiang 25' (yellow card) 52'; Gustavo 56'; Leonardo 83'; Matheus Jussal (yellow card) 31'; Wei Zhen (yellow card) 81'	Stadium: Qingdao West Coast University City Sports Center; Attendance: 12,369; Referee: Tang Shunqi

2 April 2025 4	Shanghai Port	2–1	Meizhou Hakka	Shanghai
	Gustavo 4'; Li Shenglong 44'; Mateus Vital (yellow card) 55'		Wang Shenchao 40' (o.g.); Rodrigo Henrique (yellow card) 13'; Jerome Ngom Mbekeli (yellow card) 50'; Tan Ziyi (yellow card) 53'; Wei Zhiwei (yellow card) 55'	Stadium: Shanghai Stadium; Attendance: 11,369; Referee: Zhang Lei

6 April 2025 5	Shanghai Port	1–1	Shanghai Shenhua	Shanghai
	Liu Ruofan 5'; Li Shuai (yellow card) 69' (yellow-red card); Wei Zhen (yellow card) 90+2'; Yan Junling (yellow card) 90+7'		Yu Hanchao 82'; André Luis (yellow card) 34'; Nico Yennaris (yellow card) 78'	Stadium: Pudong Football Stadium; Attendance: 24,263; Referee: Ma Ning

18 June 2025 6 (Rescheduled)	Henan	1–3	Shanghai Port	Zhengzhou
	Frank Acheampong 70'; Liu Yixin (yellow card) 60'		Li Xinxiang 32'; Gabrielzinho 44'; Leonardo 45'; Feng Jin (yellow card) 74' (yellow-red card); Liu Ruofan (yellow card) 82'; Gustavo (yellow card) 90+7'	Stadium: Hanghai Stadium

16 April 2025 7	Tianjin Jinmen Tiger	1–4	Shanghai Port	Tianjin
	Xadas 83' (pen.); Dun Ba (yellow card) 82'		Gabrielzinho 16'; Xie Weijun 39' (o.g.); Leonardo 43' (yellow card) 90+3'; Wang Shenchao 62'; Li Ang (yellow card) 82'	Stadium: TEDA Soccer Stadium; Attendance: 15,763; Referee: Liu Wei

20 April 2025 8	Shanghai Port	1–3	Chengdu Rongcheng	Shanghai
	Gustavo 31'; Wei Zhen (yellow card) 8'; Umidjan Yusup (yellow card) 28'; Li Shuai (yellow card) 56'; Yan Junling (yellow card) 66'		Rômulo 9'; Wei Shihao 21'; Timo Letschert 74'; Tim Chow (yellow card) 15'; Ming-yang Yang (yellow card) 77'; Liu Dianzuo (yellow card) 90+5'	Stadium: Shanghai Stadium; Attendance: 23,785; Referee: Li Haixin

25 April 2025 9	Yunnan Yukun	2–3	Shanghai Port	Yuxi
	Pedro Henrique 69'; Sun Xuelong 90+1'		Leonardo 20', 73'; Gabrielzinho 48'; Xu Xin (yellow card) 39'	Stadium: Yuxi Plateau Sports Center Stadium; Attendance: 22,136; Referee: Zhen Wei

1 May 2025 10	Shanghai Port	1–2	Beijing Guoan	Shanghai
	Liu Ruofan 40'; Umidjan Yusup (yellow card) 23'; Matheus Jussal (yellow card) 31'		Fábio Abreu 42'; Lin Liangming 55'; Fang Hao (yellow card) 81'	Stadium: Shanghai Stadium; Attendance: 23,785; Referee: Zhang Lei

5 May 2025 11	Wuhan Three Towns	0–2	Shanghai Port	Wuhan
	Gustavo Sauer (yellow card) 57'		Wang Shenchao 12'; Mateus Vital 45'; Zhang Linpeng (yellow card) 85'	Stadium: Wuhan Sports Center; Attendance: 8,697; Referee: Huang Yi

9 May 2025 12	Shanghai Port	3–1	Qingdao Hainiu	Shanghai
	Mateus Vital 13'; Leonardo 54'; Gustavo 88'; Ming Tian (yellow card) 39'; Zhang Linpeng (yellow card) 62'		Filipe Augusto 6' (pen.); Feng Boyuan (yellow card) 22'; Song Long (yellow card) 49'	Stadium: Shanghai Stadium; Attendance: 23,785; Referee: Zhen Wei

17 May 2025 13	Shanghai Port	1–1	Shandong Taishan	Shanghai
	Wu Lei 85' (pen.); Matheus Jussal (yellow card) 17'		Valeri Qazaishvili 57'; Huang Zhengyu (yellow card) 47'; Wang Dalei (yellow card) 65'; Guilherme Madruga (yellow card) 79'	Stadium: Shanghai Stadium; Attendance: 23,785; Referee: Memetjan Ahmat

14 June 2025 14	Zhejiang	2–2	Shanghai Port	Hangzhou
	Tao Qianglong 80'; Franko Andrijašević 90+12'; Tong Lei (yellow card) 20'; Li Tixiang (yellow card) 90+4'		Gabrielzinho 45' (yellow card) 54'; Leonardo 51'; Li Shuai (yellow card) 80'	Stadium: Huanglong Sports Center Stadium; Referee: Wang Jing

26 June 2025 15	Shanghai Port	3–0	Dalian Yingbo	Shanghai
	Gustavo 18'; Li Xinxiang 45+1'; Zhang Linpeng 90+4'		Lü Zhuoyi (yellow card) 77'	Stadium: Shanghai Stadium

30 June 2025 16	Shenzhen Peng City	1–2	Shanghai Port	Shenzhen
	Li Ning 9'; Ji Jiabao (yellow card) 79'; Matt Orr (yellow card) 68'; Umidjan Yusup (yellow card) 85'; Hu Ruibao (yellow card) 90+2'		Li Xinxiang 63'; Leonardo 77' (yellow card) 90+2'; Matheus Jussa (yellow card) 52'; Umidjan Yusup (yellow card) 85'	Stadium: Shenzhen Sports Center Stadium

18 July 2025 17	Changchun Yatai	1–3	Shanghai Port	Changchun
	Ohi Omoijuanfo 81' (pen.); Abduhamit Abdugheni (yellow card) 90+6'		Abduhamit Abdugheni 45+1' (o.g.); Gabrielzinho 71'; Xu Xin 90+12'; Leonardo (yellow card) 58'; Li Xinxiang (yellow card) 80'	Stadium: Changchun Stadium

26 July 2025 18	Shanghai Port	2–2	Qingdao West Coast	Shanghai
	Leonardo 45+12' (penalty missed) 39; Gabrielzinho 62' (pen.); Zhang Linpeng (yellow card) 23'		Nelson Le Luz 60'; Gao Di 86'; Alex Yang (yellow card) 38'; Ding Haifeng (yellow card) 90+11'	Stadium: Shanghai Stadium

2 August 2025 19	Meizhou Hakka	2–4	Shanghai Port	Wuhua
	Zhong Haoran 57'; Rodrigo Henrique 67'; Wang Jianan (yellow card) 45+7'		Gabrielzinho 15' (pen.); Leonardo 20'; Wang Jianan 29' (o.g.); Liu Ruofan 40'; Li Shenglong (yellow card) 89'; Matheus Jussa (yellow card) 90+10'	Stadium: Huitang Stadium

9 August 2025 20	Shanghai Shenhua	1–2	Shanghai Port	Shanghai
	Shinichi Chan 55'; Ibrahim Amadou (yellow card) 41'; Gao Tianyi (yellow card) 49'; Jiang Shenglong (yellow card) 52'; João Carlos Teixeira (yellow card) 85'		Gabrielzinho 27'; Leonardo 42'; Umidjan Yusup (yellow card) 9'; Fu Huan (yellow card) 87'; Li Shenglong (yellow card) 88'; Yan Junling (yellow card) 90+1'; Matheus Jussa (yellow card) 90+12'; Tyias Browning (yellow card) 90+13'	Stadium: Shanghai Stadium

15 August 2025 21	Shanghai Port	4–1	Henan	Shanghai
	Wang Shenchao 21' (yellow card) 66'; Mateus Vital 37'; Leonardo 45+5'; Óscar Melendo 55'; Oliver Gerbig (yellow card) 40'; Tyias Browning (yellow card) 77'; Yang Shiyuan (yellow card) 90+1'		Felippe Cardoso 65' (pen.); He Chao (yellow card) 58'; Frank Acheampong (yellow card) 90+3'	Stadium: Shanghai Stadium

24 August 2025 22	Shanghai Port	1–1	Tianjin Jinmen Tiger	Shanghai
	Gabrielzinho 13' (pen.); Wei Zhen (yellow card) 45+1'; Matheus Jussa (yellow card) 80'; Yang Shiyuan (yellow card) 81'		Alberto Quiles 43'; Juan Antonio Ros (yellow card) 9'; Yang Zihao (yellow card) 19'; Yang Shiyuan (yellow card) 90+1'	Stadium: Shanghai Stadium

30 August 2025 23	Chengdu Rongcheng	4–1	Shanghai Port	Chengdu
	Yahav Gurfinkel 13' (yellow card) 72'; Felipe de Sousa Silva 20', 30' (pen.); Timo Letschert 59'		Li Shuai 35'; Yang Shiyuan (yellow card) 29'; Liu Ruofan (yellow card) 50'; Óscar Melendo (yellow card) 63'; Tyias Browning (yellow card) 87'	Stadium: Phoenix Hill Football Stadium

12 September 2025 24	Shanghai Port	4–2	Yunnan Yukun	Shanghai
	Gabrielzinho (penalty missed) 8; Leonardo 29'; Liu Ruofan 46', 57'; Mateus Vital 54' (pen.) (yellow card) 80'; Matheus Jussa (yellow card) 85'		Oscar Maritu 37'; Tang Miao 63'	Stadium: Shanghai Stadium

21 September 2025 25	Beijing Guoan	2–3	Shanghai Port	Beijing
	Fábio Abreu 45+11' (pen.); Zhang Xizhe 86'		Leonardo 7', 51', 79'; Wang Shenchao (yellow card) 45+10'	Stadium: Workers' Stadium

26 September 2025 26	Shanghai Port	3–2	Wuhan Three Towns	Shanghai
	Li Shuai 37'; Leonardo 85', 90+7'; Matheus Jussa (yellow card) 32'		Zhong Jinbao 77'; Gustavo Sauer 80'	Stadium: Shanghai Stadium

17 October 2025 27	Qingdao Hainiu	3–4	Shanghai Port	Qingdao
	Didier Lamkel Zé 11', 37' (yellow card) 19'; Song Wenjie 90+5'; Liu Junshuai (yellow card) 45+3'; Elvis Sarić (yellow card) 45+6'		Gabrielzinho 14'; Leonardo 31', 40'; Li Xinxiang 89'; Óscar Melendo (yellow card) 27'	Stadium: Qingdao Youth Football Stadium

26 October 2025 28	Shandong Taishan	3–1	Shanghai Port	Jinan
	Valeri Qazaishvili 41', 77'; Liu Yang 62'; Guilherme Madruga (yellow card) 81'		Li Xinxiang 9'	Stadium: Jinan Olympic Sports Center Stadium

31 October 2025 29	Shanghai Port	3–0	Zhejiang	Shanghai
	Liu Haofan 12' (o.g.); Wang Shenchao 50'; Mateus Vital 72'; Lü Wenjun (yellow card) 78'			Stadium: Shanghai Stadium

22 November 2025 30	Dalian Yingbo	0–1	Shanghai Port	Dalian
	Mao Weijie (yellow card) 12'; Isnik Alimi (yellow card) 20'; Zakaria Labyad (yellow card) 68'		Gabrielzinho 4'	Stadium: Dalian Suoyuwan Football Stadium

Pos	Team	Pld	W	D	L	GF	GA	GD	Pts	Qualification or relegation
1	Shanghai Port (C)	30	20	6	4	72	44	+28	66	Qualification for AFC Champions League Elite league stage
2	Shanghai Shenhua	30	19	7	4	67	35	+32	64	Qualification for AFC Champions League Two group stage
3	Chengdu Rongcheng	30	17	9	4	60	28	+32	60	
4	Beijing Guoan	30	17	6	7	69	46	+23	57	Qualification for AFC Champions League Elite league stage (Note: As Chinese FA Cup winners.)
5	Shandong Taishan	30	15	8	7	69	46	+23	53	

Source: Soccerway
Rules for classification:
- During season: 1) Points; 2) Head-to-head points; 3) Head-to-head goal difference; 4) Head-to-head goals scored; 5) Goal difference; 6) Goals scored; 7) Rankings in the previous season. (Rules 2 to 4 are only applied when teams concerned have finished both/all the matches against others.)
- After season: 1) Points; 2) Head-to-head points; 3) Head-to-head goal difference; 4) Head-to-head goals scored; 5) Goal difference; 6) Goals scored; 7) Disciplinary points (yellow card = 1 point, red card = 3 points); 8) Drawing of lots.
  (C) Champions
  Notes:

=== Chinese FA Cup ===
21 May 2025 3rd Round	(2) Suzhou Dongwu	2–6	Shanghai Port	Suzhou
	Ma Fuyu 21'; Wu Junjie 51'; Xu Wu (yellow card) 56'; Chen Ao (yellow card) 84'		Gabrielzinho 23'; Matheus Jussa 48'; Li Shenglong 90+4'; Gustavo 59', 82'; Kuai Jiwen 68'; Ma Fuyu 21'; Ma Fuyu 21'; Xu Xin (yellow card) 15'; Tyias Browning (yellow card) 86'; Yang Shiyuan (yellow card) 90+3'	Stadium: Suzhou Sports Center; Attendance: 10,689; Referee: Niu Minghui

22 June 2025 4th Round	Shanghai Port	2–3	Shanghai Shenhua	Shanghai
	Gabrielzinho 46'; Gustavo 59'; Mateus Vital (yellow card) 47'; Matheus Jussa (yellow card) 90+4'; Li Shuai (yellow card) 90+8'		André Luis 44', 50', 66'; João Carlos Teixeira (yellow card) 22'; Gao Tianyi (yellow card) 45+1'	Stadium: Pudong Football Stadium

=== Chinese FA Super Cup ===
7 February 2025	Shanghai Port	2–3	Shanghai Shenhua	Kunshan
19:35 CST	Gabrielzinho 7', 80'		Amadou 67'; Yu Hanchao 90+4'; André Luis 90+7'	Stadium: Kunshan Olympic Sports Centre; Attendance: 30,927; Referee: Tang Shunqi

=== 2024–25 AFC Champions League Elite ===
Pos	Team	Pld	W	D	L	GF	GA	GD	Pts	Qualification
6	(Thailand) Buriram United	8	3	3	2	7	12	−5	12	Advance to round of 16
7	(China) Shanghai Shenhua	8	3	1	4	13	12	+1	10	Advance to round of 16
8	(China) Shanghai Port	8	2	2	4	10	18	−8	8	Advance to round of 16
9	(South Korea) Pohang Steelers	7	2	0	5	9	17	−8	6	
10	(South Korea) Ulsan HD	7	1	0	6	4	16	−12	3	

Source: Asian Football Confederation
Rules for classification: 1) points; 2) goal difference; 3) number of goals scored; 4) number of matches won; 5) penalty shoot-out if only two teams remain tied and played each other on the final matchday 6) fair play ranking; 7) drawing of lots

Win Draw Loss

==== League phase ====
11 February 2025 Matchday 7	Vissel Kobe (Japan)	4–0	(China) Shanghai Port	Kobe, Japan
	Yoshinori Muto 11'; Yuya Kuwasaki 54'; Koya Yuruki 56'; Yuya Osako 81' (penalty missed) 78; Kakeru Yamauchi (yellow card) 87'	Report	Li Shuai (yellow card) 6'; Matheus Jussa (yellow card) 67'; Yang Shiyuan (yellow card) 90+6'	Stadium: Noevir Stadium Kobe; Attendance: 5,800; Referee: Abdulrahman Al-Jassim (Qatar)

19 February 2025 Matchday 8	Shanghai Port (China)	0–2	(Japan) Yokohama F. Marinos	Shanghai, China
19:00 UTC+9	Matheus Jussa (yellow card) 38'; Wang Zhen'ao (yellow card) 51'	Report	Asahi Uenaka 64'; Jun Amano 69'; Anderson Lopes (yellow card) 40'	Stadium: Pudong Football Stadium; Attendance: 12,398; Referee: Hanna Hattab (Syria)

==== Knockout stage ====
4 March 2025 R16 Leg 1	Shanghai Port (China)	0–1	(Japan) Yokohama F. Marinos	Shanghai, China
	Mateus Vital (yellow card) 14'; Li Ang (yellow card) 28'; Yang Shiyuan (yellow card) 41'; Ablahan Haliq (yellow card) 78'	Report	Anderson Lopes 30'	Stadium: Pudong Football Stadium; Attendance: 10,860; Referee: Kim Jong-hyeok (South Korea)

11 March 2025 R16 Leg 2	Yokohama F. Marinos (Japan)	4–1 (5–1 agg.)	(China) Shanghai Port	Yokohama, Japan
	Daiya Tono 3'; Anderson Lopes 30', 56'; Yan Matheus 44'; Jun Amano (yellow card) 82'; Ryo Miyaichi (yellow card) 84'	Report	Leonardo 35'; Matheus Jussa (yellow card) 45+2'; Xu Xin (yellow card) 48'; Feng Jin (yellow card) 90+1'	Stadium: International Stadium Yokohama; Referee: Khalid Saleh Al-Turais (Saudi Arabia)

=== AFC Champions League Elite ===
==== League stage ====
17 September 2025 MD 1	Shanghai Port (China)	0–3	(Japan) Vissel Kobe	Shanghai, China
	Zhang Linpeng (yellow card) 89'	Report	Erik 19'; Taisei Miyashiro 40'; Yuya Osako 44'	Stadium: Pudong Football Stadium; Attendance: 12,966; Referee: Choi Hyun-jai (South Korea)

30 September 2025 MD 2	Sanfrecce Hiroshima (Japan)	1–1	(China) Shanghai Port	Sanfrecce, Japan
	Hayato Araki 19'; Tsukasa Shiotani (yellow card) 16'; Kim Ju-sung (yellow card) 55'		Gabrielzinho 83'; Alexander Jojo (yellow card) 77'; Gustavo (red card) 90'	Stadium: Edion Peace Wing Hiroshima; Attendance: 7,819; Referee: Alex King (Australia)

21 October 2025 MD 3	Shanghai Port (China)	0–2	(Japan) FC Machida Zelvia	Shanghai, China
	Matheus Jussa (yellow card) 88'	Report	Fu Huan 12' (o.g.); Yuki Soma 25' (yellow card) 48'	Stadium: Pudong Football Stadium; Attendance: 2,018; Referee: Ahmed Issa (United Arab Emirates)

4 November 2025 MD 4	Buriram United (Thailand)	2–0	(China) Shanghai Port	Buriram, Thailand
	Supachai Chaided 15'; Curtis Good 65'	Report		Stadium: Chang Arena; Attendance: 14,161; Referee: Asker Nadjafaliev (Uzbekistan)

25 November 2025 MD 5	Shanghai Port (China)	1–3	(South Korea) FC Seoul	Shanghai, China
	Mateus Vital 61'; Lyu Wenjun (yellow card) 30'; Zhang Linpeng (yellow card) 86'	Report	Jesse Lingard 47', 77' (yellow card) 86'; Lucas Silva 67'; Lee Seung-Mo (yellow card) 56'	Stadium: Pudong Football Stadium; Attendance: 11,501; Referee: Khaled Al-Hoish (Saudi Arabia)

9 December 2025 MD 6	Johor Darul Ta'zim (Malaysia)	0–0	(China) Shanghai Port	Johor, Malaysia
	Antonio Glauder (yellow card) 30'	Report	Yang Shiyuan (yellow card) 47'; Zhang Linpeng (yellow card) 52'; Fu Huan (yellow card) 90+7'	Stadium: Sultan Ibrahim Stadium; Attendance: 19,760; Referee: Shaun Evans (Australia)

11 February 2026 MD 7	Gangwon FC (South Korea)	0–0	(China) Shanghai Port	Gangneung, South Korea
		Report	Umidjan Yusup (yellow card) 26'	Stadium: Gangneung Stadium; Referee: Ahmed Al-Kaf (Oman)

18 February 2026 MD 8	Shanghai Port (China)	0-0	(South Korea) Ulsan HD FC	Shanghai, China
18:00	Alex Yang (yellow card) 26'	Report	Cho Hyun-taek (yellow card) 26'	Stadium: Pudong Football Stadium; Attendance: 15,103; Referee: Adel Ali Al-Naqbi (United Arab Emirates)

Pos	Team	Pld	W	D	L	GF	GA	GD	Pts	Qualification
8	(South Korea) Gangwon FC	8	2	3	3	9	11	−2	9	Advance to round of 16
9	(South Korea) Ulsan HD	8	2	3	3	6	8	−2	9	
10	(China) Chengdu Rongcheng	8	1	3	4	7	11	−4	6	
11	(China) Shanghai Shenhua	8	1	1	6	5	13	−8	4	
12	(China) Shanghai Port	8	0	4	4	2	11	−9	4	

Source: AFC
Rules for classification: 1) points; 2) goal difference; 3) number of goals scored; 4) number of matches won; 5) penalty shoot-out if only two teams remain tied and played each other on the final matchday 6) fair play ranking; 7) drawing of lots
