= 2019 EAFF E-1 Football Championship Final squads =

The following is a list of squads for each nation competing in 2019 EAFF E-1 Football Championship Final in Busan, South Korea. Each nation must submit a squad of 23 players, including 3 goalkeepers.

Age, caps and goals as of the start of the tournament, 10 December 2019.

== China ==
Head coach: Li Tie

No.	Pos.	Player	Date of birth (age)	Caps	Goals	Club
1	GK	Liu Dianzuo	26 June 1990 (aged 29)	0	0	(Chinese Football Association) Guangzhou Evergrande Taobao
14	GK	Zou Dehai	27 February 1993 (aged 26)	0	0	(Chinese Football Association) Beijing Sinobo Guoan
23	GK	Dong Chunyu	25 March 1991 (aged 28)	0	0	(Chinese Football Association) Wuhan Zall
2	DF	Li Ang	15 September 1993 (aged 26)	3	0	(Chinese Football Association) Jiangsu Suning
3	DF	Mei Fang (vice-captain)	14 November 1989 (aged 30)	22	1	(Chinese Football Association) Guangzhou Evergrande Taobao
4	DF	Wang Shenchao	8 February 1989 (aged 30)	7	0	(Chinese Football Association) Shanghai SIPG
5	DF	Yang Fan	28 March 1996 (aged 23)	0	0	(Chinese Football Association) Tianjin TEDA
11	DF	Jiang Zhipeng	6 March 1989 (aged 30)	24	0	(Chinese Football Association) Hebei China Fortune
15	DF	Ming Tian	8 April 1995 (aged 24)	0	0	(Chinese Football Association) Wuhan Zall
22	DF	Yu Dabao (captain)	17 April 1988 (aged 31)	57	19	(Chinese Football Association) Beijing Sinobo Guoan
6	MF	Cai Huikang	10 October 1989 (aged 30)	21	0	(Chinese Football Association) Shanghai SIPG
7	MF	Feng Jin	14 August 1993 (aged 26)	1	0	(Chinese Football Association) Chongqing Dangdai Lifan
10	MF	Zhang Xizhe	23 January 1991 (aged 28)	27	5	(Chinese Football Association) Beijing Sinobo Guoan
12	MF	Ji Xiang	1 March 1990 (aged 29)	9	0	(Chinese Football Association) Jiangsu Suning
13	MF	Mirahmetjan Muzepper	14 January 1991 (aged 28)	7	0	(Chinese Football Association) Tianjin TEDA
16	MF	Cao Yunding	22 November 1989 (aged 30)	2	0	(Chinese Football Association) Shanghai Greenland Shenhua
17	MF	Jin Jingdao	18 January 1992 (aged 27)	10	0	(Chinese Football Association) Shandong Luneng Taishan
20	MF	Li Hang	19 September 1989 (aged 30)	0	0	(Chinese Football Association) Wuhan Zall
21	MF	Wang Shangyuan	2 June 1993 (aged 26)	0	0	(Chinese Football Association) Henan Jianye
8	FW	Tan Long	1 April 1988 (aged 31)	3	0	(Chinese Football Association) Changchun Yatai
9	FW	Dong Xuesheng	22 May 1989 (aged 30)	5	0	(Chinese Football Association) Hebei China Fortune
18	FW	Wang Ziming	5 August 1996 (aged 23)	1	0	(Chinese Football Association) Beijing Sinobo Guoan
19	FW	Wei Shihao	8 April 1995 (aged 24)	13	2	(Chinese Football Association) Guangzhou Evergrande Taobao

== Hong Kong ==
Head coach: (Finland) Mixu Paatelainen

No.	Pos.	Player	Date of birth (age)	Caps	Goals	Club
1	GK	Yapp Hung Fai (vice-captain)	21 March 1990 (age 36)	74	0	(Football Association of Hong Kong, China) Eastern
18	GK	Yuen Ho Chun	19 July 1995 (age 30)	0	0	(Football Association of Hong Kong, China) Lee Man
19	GK	Tse Tak Him	10 February 1985 (age 41)	9	0	(Football Association of Hong Kong, China) Southern
2	DF	Tsui Wang Kit	5 January 1997 (age 29)	8	0	(Chinese Football Association) Meizhou Hakka
3	DF	Law Tsz Chun	2 March 1997 (age 29)	4	0	(Football Association of Hong Kong, China) Kitchee
4	DF	Fung Hing Wa	12 December 1992 (age 33)	0	0	(Football Association of Hong Kong, China) Eastern
5	DF	Hélio	13 January 1986 (age 40)	21	0	(Football Association of Hong Kong, China) Kitchee
12	DF	Leung Nok Hang	14 November 1994 (age 31)	3	0	(Football Association of Hong Kong, China) R&F
13	DF	Li Ngai Hoi	15 October 1994 (age 31)	4	0	(Football Association of Hong Kong, China) Kitchee
15	DF	Roberto	28 May 1983 (age 42)	20	1	(Football Association of Hong Kong, China) R&F
21	DF	Tong Kin Man	10 January 1985 (age 41)	6	0	(Football Association of Hong Kong, China) Kitchee
6	MF	Huang Yang (captain)	19 October 1983 (age 42)	54	1	(Football Association of Hong Kong, China) Kitchee
7	MF	Wong Wai	17 September 1992 (age 33)	24	1	(Football Association of Hong Kong, China) Eastern
8	MF	Chung Wai Keung	21 October 1995 (age 30)	6	1	(Football Association of Hong Kong, China) Eastern
10	MF	Ju Yingzhi	24 July 1987 (age 38)	29	4	(Football Association of Hong Kong, China) Kitchee
11	MF	Cheng Chin Lung	7 January 1998 (age 28)	1	0	(Football Association of Hong Kong, China) Kitchee
16	MF	Tan Chun Lok	5 January 1996 (age 30)	27	2	(Chinese Football Association) Guangzhou R&F
17	MF	Chan Siu Kwan	1 August 1992 (age 33)	1	0	(Football Association of Hong Kong, China) Southern
20	MF	Cheng Siu Kwan	3 November 1997 (age 28)	3	0	(Football Association of Hong Kong, China) Lee Man
9	FW	Sandro	10 March 1987 (age 39)	28	7	(Football Association of Hong Kong, China) Tai Po
14	FW	James Ha	26 December 1992 (age 33)	6	1	(Football Association of Hong Kong, China) Southern
22	FW	Giovane	25 November 1982 (age 43)	4	0	(Football Association of Hong Kong, China) R&F
23	FW	Sun Ming Him	19 June 2000 (age 25)	3	0	(Football Association of Hong Kong, China) Tai Po

== Japan ==
Head coach: Hajime Moriyasu

No.	Pos.	Player	Date of birth (age)	Caps	Goals	Club
1	GK	Kosuke Nakamura	27 February 1995 (aged 24)	4	0	(Japan Football Association) Kashiwa Reysol
12	GK	Ryosuke Kojima	30 January 1997 (aged 22)	0	0	(Japan Football Association) Oita Trinita
23	GK	Keisuke Osako	28 July 1999 (aged 20)	1	0	(Japan Football Association) Sanfrecce Hiroshima
2	DF	Daiki Suga	10 September 1998 (aged 21)	0	0	(Japan Football Association) Hokkaido Consadole Sapporo
4	DF	Shinnosuke Hatanaka	25 August 1995 (aged 24)	4	0	(Japan Football Association) Yokohama F. Marinos
5	DF	Genta Miura	1 March 1995 (aged 24)	8	0	(Japan Football Association) Gamba Osaka
15	DF	Tsuyoshi Watanabe	5 February 1997 (aged 22)	0	0	(Japan Football Association) FC Tokyo
19	DF	Sho Sasaki (captain)	2 October 1989 (aged 30)	7	0	(Japan Football Association) Sanfrecce Hiroshima
21	DF	Taiyo Koga	28 October 1998 (aged 21)	0	0	(Japan Football Association) Kashiwa Reysol
22	DF	Daiki Hashioka	17 May 1999 (aged 20)	0	0	(Japan Football Association) Urawa Red Diamonds
3	MF	Shunta Tanaka	26 May 1997 (aged 22)	0	0	(Japan Football Association) Osaka University
6	MF	Ryota Oshima	23 January 1993 (aged 26)	5	0	(Japan Football Association) Kawasaki Frontale
7	MF	Keita Endo	22 November 1997 (aged 22)	0	0	(Japan Football Association) Yokohama F. Marinos
8	MF	Yosuke Ideguchi	23 August 1996 (aged 23)	13	2	(Japan Football Association) Gamba Osaka
9	MF	Musashi Suzuki	11 February 1994 (aged 25)	5	0	(Japan Football Association) Hokkaido Consadole Sapporo
10	MF	Teruhito Nakagawa	27 July 1992 (aged 27)	0	0	(Japan Football Association) Yokohama F. Marinos
14	MF	Tsukasa Morishima	25 April 1997 (aged 22)	0	0	(Japan Football Association) Sanfrecce Hiroshima
16	MF	Yuki Soma	25 February 1997 (aged 22)	0	0	(Japan Football Association) Kashima Antlers
17	MF	Ao Tanaka	10 September 1998 (aged 21)	0	0	(Japan Football Association) Kawasaki Frontale
18	MF	Kento Hashimoto	16 August 1993 (aged 26)	6	0	(Japan Football Association) FC Tokyo
11	FW	Kyosuke Tagawa	11 February 1999 (aged 20)	0	0	(Japan Football Association) FC Tokyo
13	FW	Ayase Ueda	28 August 1998 (aged 21)	3	0	(Japan Football Association) Kashima Antlers
20	FW	Koki Ogawa	8 August 1997 (aged 22)	0	0	(Japan Football Association) Mito HollyHock

== South Korea ==
Head coach: (Portugal) Paulo Bento

No.	Pos.	Player	Date of birth (age)	Caps	Goals	Club
1	GK	Kim Seung-gyu	30 September 1990 (aged 29)	47	0	(Korea Football Association) Ulsan Hyundai
12	GK	Gu Sung-yun	27 June 1994 (aged 25)	1	0	(Japan Football Association) Hokkaido Consadole Sapporo
21	GK	Jo Hyeon-woo	25 September 1991 (aged 28)	15	0	(Korea Football Association) Daegu FC
2	DF	Kim Tae-hwan	24 July 1989 (aged 30)	5	0	(Korea Football Association) Ulsan Hyundai
3	DF	Kim Jin-su	13 June 1992 (aged 27)	44	1	(Korea Football Association) Jeonbuk Hyundai Motors
4	DF	Kim Min-jae	15 November 1996 (aged 23)	27	2	(Chinese Football Association) Beijing Guoan
6	DF	Park Joo-ho	16 January 1987 (aged 32)	39	1	(Korea Football Association) Ulsan Hyundai
15	DF	Kim Moon-hwan	1 August 1995 (aged 24)	11	0	(Korea Football Association) Busan IPark
19	DF	Kim Young-gwon (captain)	27 February 1990 (aged 29)	76	3	(Japan Football Association) Gamba Osaka
20	DF	Kwon Kyung-won	31 January 1992 (aged 27)	12	1	(Korea Football Association) Jeonbuk Hyundai Motors
23	DF	Park Ji-soo	13 June 1994 (aged 25)	3	0	(Chinese Football Association) Guangzhou Evergrande
5	MF	Son Jun-ho	12 May 1992 (aged 27)	3	0	(Korea Football Association) Jeonbuk Hyundai Motors
7	MF	Kim In-sung	9 September 1989 (aged 30)	0	0	(Korea Football Association) Ulsan Hyundai
8	MF	Ju Se-jong	30 October 1990 (aged 29)	24	1	(Korea Football Association) FC Seoul
10	MF	Kim Bo-kyung	6 October 1989 (aged 30)	37	4	(Korea Football Association) Ulsan Hyundai
11	MF	Moon Seon-min	9 June 1992 (aged 27)	11	2	(Korea Football Association) Jeonbuk Hyundai Motors
13	MF	Han Seung-gyu	28 September 1996 (aged 23)	0	0	(Korea Football Association) Jeonbuk Hyundai Motors
14	MF	Lee Yeong-jae	13 September 1994 (aged 25)	0	0	(Korea Football Association) Gangwon FC
16	MF	Hwang In-beom	20 September 1996 (aged 23)	20	1	(Canadian Soccer Association) Vancouver Whitecaps FC
17	MF	Na Sang-ho	12 August 1996 (aged 23)	10	1	(Japan Football Association) FC Tokyo
22	MF	Yun Il-lok	7 March 1992 (aged 27)	8	1	(Korea Football Association) Jeju United
9	FW	Kim Seung-dae	1 April 1991 (aged 28)	5	1	(Korea Football Association) Jeonbuk Hyundai Motors
18	FW	Lee Jeong-hyeop	24 June 1991 (aged 28)	21	5	(Korea Football Association) Busan IPark
