= Umidjan Yusup =

Chinese footballer (born 2004)

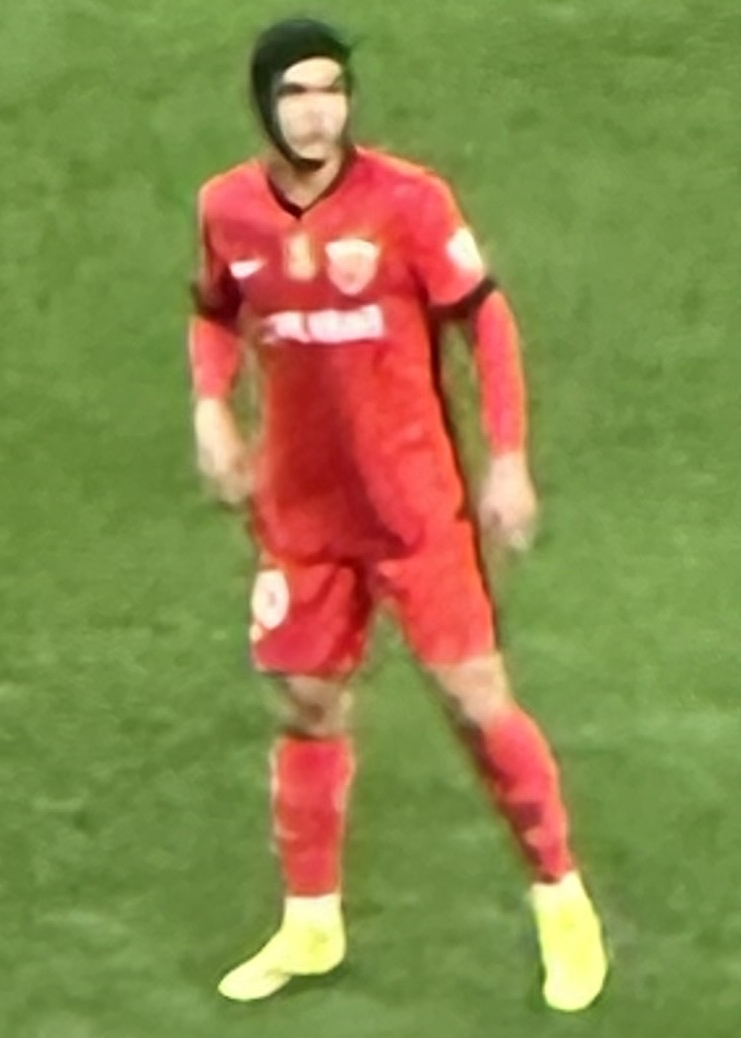
- Umidjan in 2025

Personal information
- Full name: Umidjan Yusup
- Date of birth: 28 February 2004 (age 22)
- Place of birth: Yarkant County, Xinjiang, China
- Height: 1.82 m (6 ft 0 in)
- Position: Centre-back

Team information
- Current team: Shanghai Port
- Number: 40

Youth career
- –2021: Xinjiang Snowland Tiancheng

Senior career*
Years	Team	Apps	(Gls)
2021	Xinjiang Snowland Tiancheng	3	(0)
2022–2024	Wuhan Three Towns	17	(0)
2023	→ Hainan Star (loan)	21	(1)
2025–	Shanghai Port	46	(0)

International career^{‡}
2025–2026	China U23	12	(0)
2025–	China	5	(0)
Medal record
Men's football
Representing China
EAFF Championship
Bronze medal – third place	2025 South Korea	Team
AFC U-23 Asian Cup
Runner-up	2026 Saudi Arabia	Team
- * Club domestic league appearances and goals as of 19 November 2026 ‡ National team caps and goals as of 22 January 2026

Umidjan Yusup (simplified Chinese: 吾米提江·玉苏普; traditional Chinese: 吾米提江·玉蘇普; pinyin: Wúmǐtíjiāng Yùsūpǔ; born 28 February 2004) is an Uygur-Chinese professional footballer who plays as a centre-back for Chinese Super League club Shanghai Port and the China national team.

== Club career ==
=== Early career ===
Born in Yarkant County in southern Xinjiang, Umidjan followed Ürümqi-based club Xinjiang Snowland Tiancheng to compete in the 2021 Chinese Champions League, where the club was eventually knocked out in the semi-finals. The same year, Umidjan represented his home region of Xinjiang in the 2021 National Games of China at the under-18 level.

=== Wuhan Three Towns ===
In 2022, Umidjan joined the reserve team of newly promoted Chinese Super League side Wuhan Three Towns. On 4 January 2023, Umidjan made his senior and professional debut in a 2022 Chinese FA Cup quarter-final tie against Shandong Taishan, when he came on as a second-half substitute for Shewketjan Tayir, fielding the number 48 shirt.

==== Hainan Star loan ====
In April 2023, Umidjan was loaned out to China League Two side Hainan Star. On 5 June 2023, Umidjan scored his first goal for Hainan Star, in a 2–1 away loss to Chongqing Tonglianglong. Throughout the 2023 China League Two season, Umidjan was a consistent starter for the club, making 23 appearances in all competitions.

==== Return from loan ====
On 28 February 2024, Wuhan Three Towns announced that Umidjan was registered in their first-team squad for the 2024 Chinese Super League season, with Umidjan wearing the number 40. On 1 March 2024, Umidjan started in a 3–1 away defeat to defending champions Shanghai Port in his Chinese Super League debut. In a post-match press conference, Wuhan Three Towns manager Ricardo Rodríguez remarked that Umidjan was one of the best-performing players of his side. On 16 August 2024, in a league match against Tianjin Jinmen Tiger, Umidjan suffered a skull fracture after a collision with Tianjin midfielder Xadas.

=== Shanghai Port ===
On 18 February 2025, Umidjan completed a transfer to Chinese Super League's defending champions Shanghai Port for a rumoured ¥6,000,000 transfer fee.

== International career ==
On 27 November 2024, Umidjan was called up to the China U21 national team.

On 3 January 2025, Umidjan received his first call-up to the China senior national team, for a ten-day long training camp in Haikou, being one of three players from Xinjiang selected for the camp.

== Career statistics ==
=== Club ===
As of 25 November 2025

Appearances and goals by club, season, and competition
Club	Season	League			Cup		Continental		Other		Total	
Club	Season	Division	Apps	Goals	Apps	Goals	Apps	Goals	Apps	Goals	Apps	Goals
Xinjiang Snowland Tiancheng	2021	Chinese Champions League	3	0	–		–		–		3	0
Wuhan Three Towns	2022	Chinese Super League	0	0	2	0	–		–		2	0
Wuhan Three Towns	2024	Chinese Super League	17	0	1	0	–		–		18	0
Wuhan Three Towns	Total		17	0	3	0	0	0	0	0	20	0
Hainan Star (loan)	2023	China League Two	21	1	2	0	–		–		23	1
Shanghai Port	2025	Chinese Super League	21	0	1	0	5 (Note: Appearances in AFC Champions League Elite)	0	–		27	0
Career total			62	1	6	0	5	0	0	0	73	1

=== International ===
As of 12 July 2025

Appearances and goals by national team and year
National team	Year	Apps	Goals
China	2025	2	0
China	2026	3	0
Total		5	0

== Honours ==
Shanghai Port

- Chinese Super League: 2025

China U23

- AFC U-23 Asian Cup runner-up: 2026
