= Li Haoran =

Chinese footballer

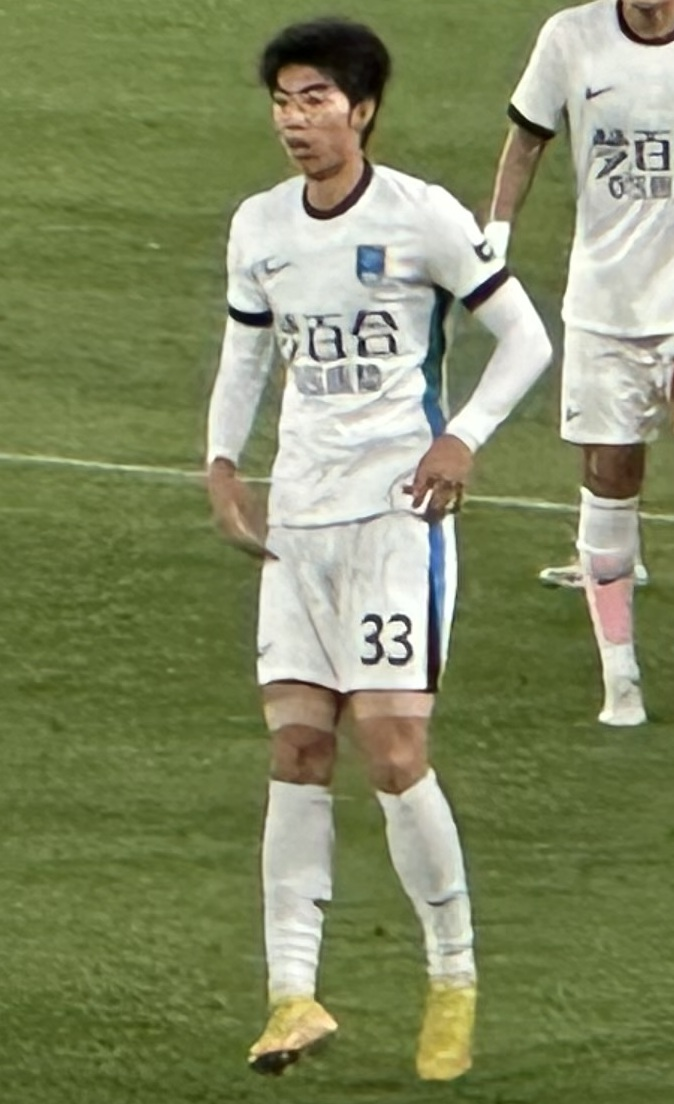
- Li Haoran in May 2025

Personal information
- Date of birth: 5 November 1999 (age 27)
- Place of birth: Changchun, Jilin, China
- Height: 1.92 m (6 ft 4 in)
- Positions: Left-back; left winger

Team information
- Current team: Liaoning Tieren
- Number: 35

Youth career
- 2011–2012: Shenyang Shenbei
- –2018: Shanghai SIPG
- 2018: Anderlecht

Senior career*
Years	Team	Apps	(Gls)
2018–2019	Rudar Velenje	4	(0)
2019–2021	Antwerp	0	(0)
2021	Tianjin Jinmen Tiger	7	(0)
2022–2023	Sesvete	0	(0)
2023–2024	Karlovac 1919	0	(0)
2024–2025	Shanghai Port	0	(0)
2024	→ Shanghai Port B (loan)	28	(1)
2025	→ Nantong Zhiyun (loan)	24	(1)
2026–	Liaoning Tieren	25	(1)
- * Club domestic league appearances and goals as of 22 November 2026

Li Haoran (Chinese: 李浩然; born 5 November 1999) is a Chinese footballer who played as a winger for Liaoning Tieren.

== Club career ==
Li Haoran represented Shanghai SIPG's youth team and was selected to represent Shanghai in the 2017 National Games of China where he was part of the team that won the football at the tournament. He was scouted by Belgian club Anderlecht and was offered a six-month short-term contract with the option of an extension, which was not taken up. On 30 August 2018 he transferred on a free to Slovenian club Rudar Velenje and he made his debut in a league game on 14 April 2019, against Triglav Kranj in a 4-0 victory.

== Career statistics ==
=== Club ===
As of 01 July 2024

Club	Season	League			Cup		Continental		Other		Total	
Club	Season	Division	Apps	Goals	Apps	Goals	Apps	Goals	Apps	Goals	Apps	Goals
Rudar Velenje	2018–19	1. SNL	4	0	0	0	—		0	0	4	0
Antwerp	2019–20	Jupiler Pro League	0	0	0	0	—		0	0	0	0
Antwerp	2020–21	Jupiler Pro League	0	0	0	0	—		0	0	0	0
Antwerp	Total		0	0	0	0	0	0	0	0	0	0
Tianjin Jinmen Tiger	2021	Chinese Super League	7	0	0	0	—		0	0	7	0
Sesvete	2022–23	Druga NL	0	0	—		—		0	0	0	0
Karlovac 1919	2023–24	Druga NL	0	0	3	0	—		0	0	3	0
Shanghai Port B	2024	China League Two	28	1	—		—		0	0	28	1
Career total			39	1	3	0	0	0	0	0	45	1
