= Bao Shimeng =

Chinese footballer (born 2003)

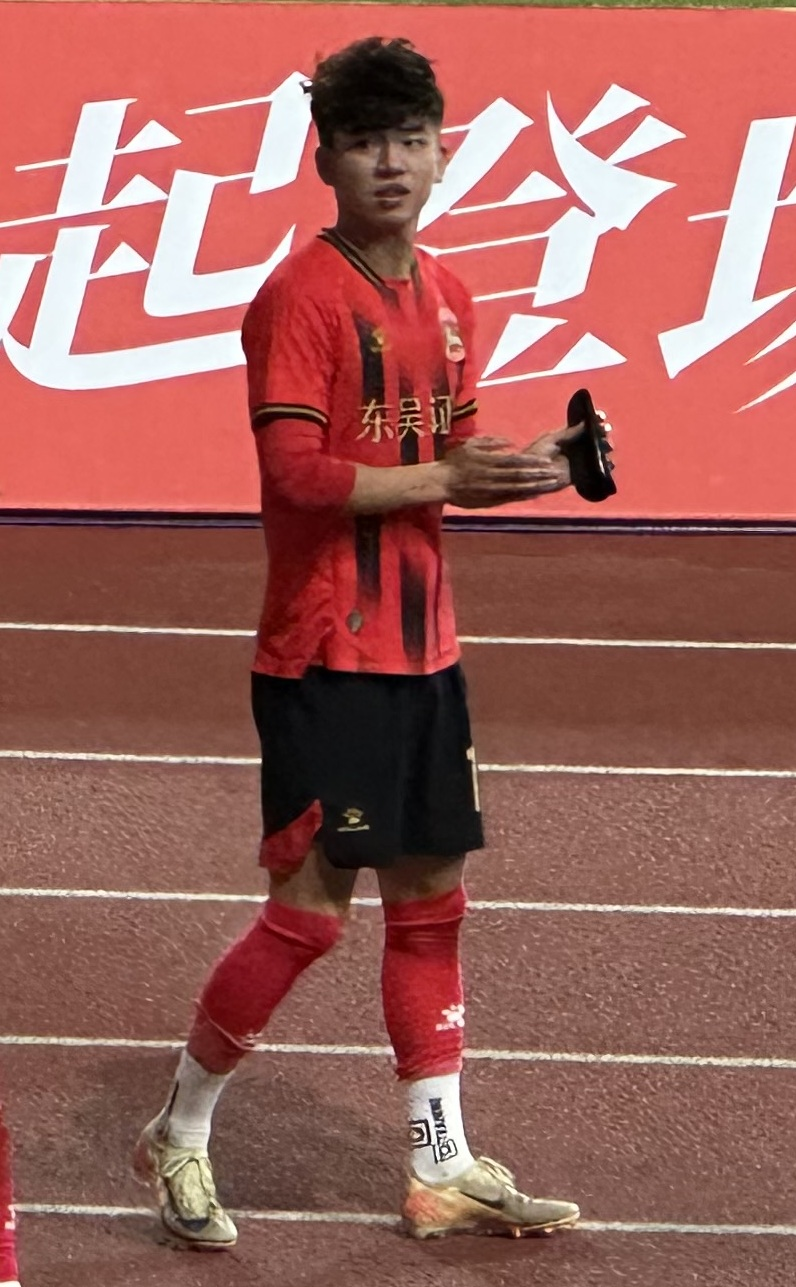
- Bao Shimeng in May 2025

Personal information
- Full name: Bao Shimeng
- Date of birth: 2 July 2003 (age 23)
- Place of birth: Yanshi, Henan, China
- Height: 1.80 m (5 ft 11 in)
- Positions: Left-back; right-back

Team information
- Current team: Shanghai Port
- Number: 31

Youth career
- –2024: Shanghai Port

Senior career*
Years	Team	Apps	(Gls)
2024–	Shanghai Port	18	(0)
2025	→ Suzhou Dongwu (loan)	25	(1)

International career^{‡}
2024–2026	China U23	15	(0)
Medal record
Men's football
Representing China
AFC U-23 Asian Cup
Runner-up	2026 Saudi Arabia	Team
- * Club domestic league appearances and goals as of 19 November 2026 ‡ National team caps and goals as of 4 January 2026

Bao Shimeng (Chinese: 鲍世蒙; pinyin: Bào Shìméng; born 2 July 2003) is a Chinese professional footballer who plays as a defender for Chinese Super League club Shanghai Port.

== Early life and youth career ==
Bao was born in Yanshi District, Luoyang, Henan Province. He began playing football at Dongfang Third Primary School in Jianxi District, Luoyang. In fifth grade, he impressed at a national youth tournament and was selected for trials with a Shanghai-based football school. At age 11, he relocated to Shanghai alone to pursue professional training, eventually joining the Shanghai Port youth academy.

In 2021, Bao represented Shanghai U18 in the National Games of China, making substitute appearances in qualifiers against Fujian and Zhejiang. In October 2021, he scored for Shanghai Port U19 in a 2–0 victory against Meizhou Hakka in the CFA U19 League.

During the 2023 season, Bao was a key player for Shanghai Port U21 in the CFA U21 League, contributing two assists in a 3–1 victory over Tianjin Jinmen Tiger U21 in April 2023 and another assist in the finals against Chengdu Rongcheng U21 in October 2023. The team finished as runners-up, qualifying for China League Two.

== Club career ==
=== Shanghai Port ===
In February 2024, Bao was promoted to the Shanghai Port first team by head coach Kevin Muscat. He had participated in the club's winter training in Guangzhou and Haikou, where he impressed in trial matches playing as a left back.

Bao made his professional debut on 30 March 2024 in the Chinese Super League, made his first start in a 3–1 victory over Henan. During the 2024 season, he made 10 appearances (1 start) across all competitions, winning the 2024 Chinese Super League and the 2024 Chinese FA Cup with the club.

=== Suzhou Dongwu ===
On 24 February 2025, Bao joined China League One club Suzhou Dongwu on loan for the 2025 season. He made 25 league appearances (17 starts) during the season, scoring one goal.

On 20 September 2025, Bao scored the decisive goal in the 3rd minute of a 1–0 victory over Qingdao Red Lions, securing the club's first win in seven matches. On 8 November 2025, he provided an assist in stoppage time for Ayniwar Memet in a 1–0 victory over Jiangxi Dingnan United.

== International career ==
In September 2024, Bao was called up to the China U21 national team for friendly matches against Vietnam and Uzbekistan. He made seven appearances (six starts) for the U21 team in 2024.

In November 2025, Bao represented the China U22 team at the CFA Team China Panda Cup in Chengdu.

In January 2026, Bao was selected for the 2026 AFC U-23 Asian Cup squad in Saudi Arabia. He started the opening match against Iraq but suffered an ankle injury in the 8th minute and was substituted. The injury limited his participation in the tournament, though he remained with the squad as China finished as runners-up.

== Career statistics ==
As of 8 November 2025

Appearances and goals by club, season and competition
Club	Season	League			National Cup		Continental		Other		Total	
Club	Season	Division	Apps	Goals	Apps	Goals	Apps	Goals	Apps	Goals	Apps	Goals
Shanghai Port	2024	Chinese Super League	10	0	0	0	0	0	0	0	10	0
Suzhou Dongwu (loan)	2025	China League One	25	1	—		—		—		25	1
Career total			35	1	0	0	0	0	0	0	35	1

== Honours ==
Shanghai Port

- Chinese Super League: 2024
- Chinese FA Cup: 2024

China U23

- AFC U-23 Asian Cup runner-up: 2026
