= Alex Yang =

Chinese footballer (born 2005)

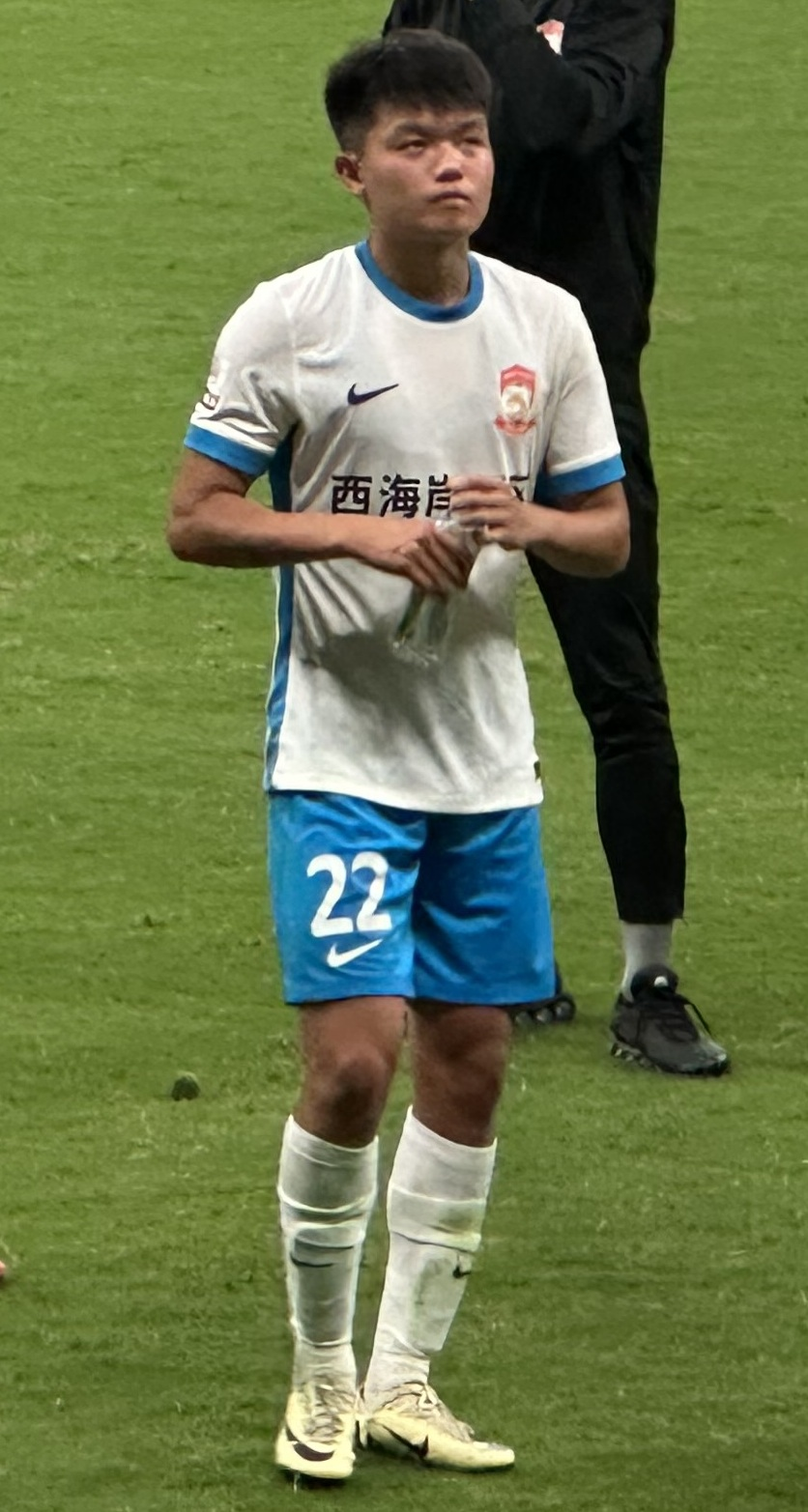
- Yang in June 2025

Personal information
- Full name: Alex Xi Yang
- Date of birth: 13 June 2005 (age 21)
- Place of birth: Barcelona, Spain
- Height: 1.79 m (5 ft 10 in)
- Position: Wing back

Team information
- Current team: Shanghai Port
- Number: 22

Youth career
- 2015–2024: Espanyol

Senior career*
Years	Team	Apps	(Gls)
2022	Espanyol B	15	(0)
2024	L'Hospitalet	7	(1)
2025	Qingdao West Coast	21	(0)
2026–	Shanghai Port	29	(2)

International career^{‡}
2024–2025	China U20	5	(0)
2025–	China U22	5	(0)
2026–	China	6	(0)
Medal record
Representing China
AFC U-23 Asian Cup
Silver medal – second place	2026 Saudi Arabia	Team
Asian Games
Bronze medal – third place	2026 Aichi–Nagoya	Team
- * Club domestic league appearances and goals as of 19 November 2026 ‡ National team caps and goals as of 19:16, 1 April 2026 (UTC)

Alex Xi Yang (Chinese: 杨希; born 13 June 2005) is a professional footballer who plays as a defender for Shanghai Port. Born in Spain, he plays for the China national team.

== Early life ==
Yang was born on 13 June 2005 in Barcelona, Spain to Chinese parents. At the age of twelve, he switched from seven-a-side football to eleven-a-side football.

== Club career ==
As a youth player, Yang joined the youth academy of Spanish side Espanyol and was promoted to the club's reserve team in 2022. In 2024, he signed for Spanish side L'Hospitalet. Ahead of the 2025 season, he signed for Chinese side Qingdao West Coast.

On 5 February 2026, Yang joined the 2025 Chinese Super League winner Shanghai Port.

== Style of play ==
Yang plays as a defender. Right-footed, he is known for his crossing ability and his ability to contribute offensively.

== Honours ==
China U23

- AFC U-23 Asian Cup runner-up: 2026

Hubei U20

- Football at the National Games of China: 2025
