= Ming Tian =

Chinese association football player

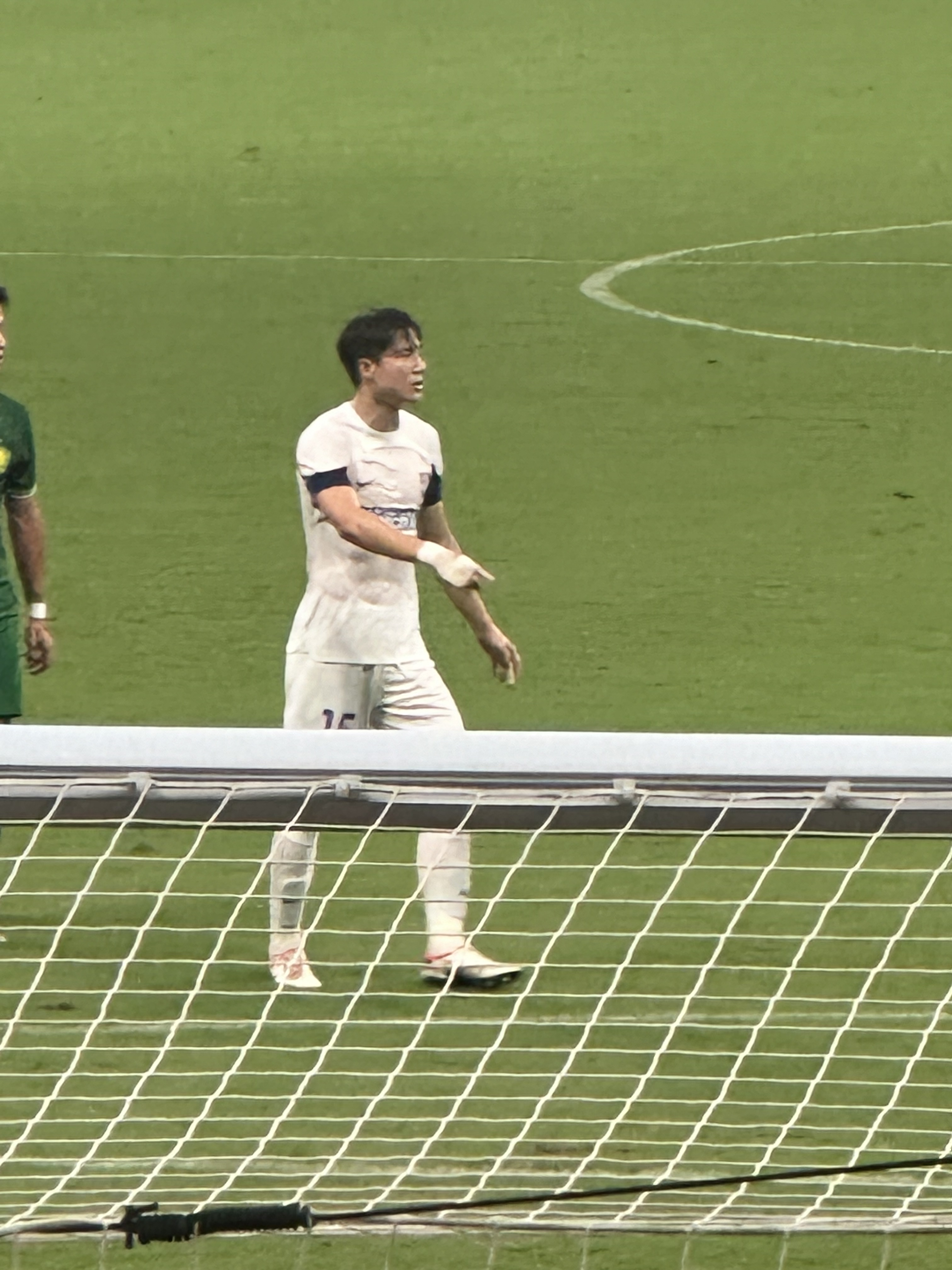
- Ming Tian in July 2024

Personal information
- Date of birth: 8 April 1995 (age 31)
- Place of birth: Wuhan, Hubei, China
- Height: 1.80 m (5 ft 11 in)
- Position: Right-back

Team information
- Current team: Wuhan Three Towns
- Number: 23

Senior career*
Years	Team	Apps	(Gls)
2014–2022	Wuhan Yangtze River	149	(3)
2023–2024	Tianjin Jinmen Tiger	41	(0)
2025	Shanghai Port	14	(0)
2026–	Wuhan Three Towns	26	(0)

International career^{‡}
2014	China U19	3	(0)
2019–	China	5	(0)
Medal record
Representing China
Men's football
EAFF Championship
Bronze medal – third place	2019 South Korea	Team
- * Club domestic league appearances and goals as of 22 November 2026 ‡ National team caps and goals as of 16:41, 11 June 2021 (UTC)

Ming Tian (Chinese: 明天; pinyin: Míng Tiān; born 8 April 1995) is a Chinese professional footballer who currently plays as a right-back for Wuhan Three Towns and the China national team.

== Club career ==
Ming Tian would play for the Wuhan Zall youth team before being sent to France to study with the FC Sochaux-Montbéliard football team for three months. On his return he would be promoted to the senior team and go on to establish himself as regular within the club. He would go on to be an integral member of the team that gained promotion to the top tier for the club by winning the 2018 China League One division. He would make his top tier debut on 1 March 2019 against Beijing Guoan in a league game that ended in a 1–0 defeat. This would be followed by his first goal for the club on 1 June 2019 in a league game against Shenzhen FC that ended in 2–0 victory.

At the end of the 2022 Chinese Super League season, Wuhan were relegated. On 25 January 2023, the club announced that it had dissolved due to financial difficulties. On 7 April 2023, Ming was free to transfer to fellow top tier club Tianjin Jinmen Tiger.

On 27 January 2025, Ming signed Chinese Super League club Shanghai Port.

After the 2025 season, Ming returned to Wuhan and joined former Chinese Super League champion Wuhan Three Towns on 19 February 2026.

== International career ==
On 10 December 2019, Ming would make his senior international debut against Japan in a 2–1 defeat in the EAFF E-1 Football Championship.

== Career statistics ==
=== Club ===
As of 31 December 2022.

Club	Season	League			Cup		Continental		Other		Total	
Club	Season	Division	Apps	Goals	Apps	Goals	Apps	Goals	Apps	Goals	Apps	Goals
Wuhan Zall/ Wuhan FC/ Wuhan Yangtze River	2014	China League One	0	0	0	0	–		–		0	0
Wuhan Zall/ Wuhan FC/ Wuhan Yangtze River	2015	China League One	10	0	0	0	–		–		10	0
Wuhan Zall/ Wuhan FC/ Wuhan Yangtze River	2016	China League One	27	0	0	0	–		–		27	0
Wuhan Zall/ Wuhan FC/ Wuhan Yangtze River	2017	China League One	15	0	0	0	–		–		15	0
Wuhan Zall/ Wuhan FC/ Wuhan Yangtze River	2018	China League One	27	0	0	0	–		–		27	0
Wuhan Zall/ Wuhan FC/ Wuhan Yangtze River	2019	Chinese Super League	28	2	0	0	–		–		28	2
Wuhan Zall/ Wuhan FC/ Wuhan Yangtze River	2020	Chinese Super League	19	0	0	0	–		2 (Note: Appearance(s) in Promotion/Relegation Play-offs)	0	21	0
Wuhan Zall/ Wuhan FC/ Wuhan Yangtze River	2021	Chinese Super League	4	0	0	0	–		–		4	0
Wuhan Zall/ Wuhan FC/ Wuhan Yangtze River	2022	Chinese Super League	19	1	0	0	–		–		19	1
Wuhan Zall/ Wuhan FC/ Wuhan Yangtze River	Total		149	3	0	0	0	0	2	0	151	3
Tianjin Jinmen Tiger	2023	Chinese Super League	0	0	0	0	–		–		0	0
Career total			149	3	0	0	0	0	2	0	151	3

=== International ===
As of matches played 11 June 2021.

National team	Year	Apps	Goals
China	2019	2	0
China	2020	0	0
China	2021	3	0
Total		5	0

== Honours ==
=== Club ===
Wuhan Zall

- China League One: 2018

Shanghai Port

- Chinese Super League: 2025
