= Feng Jin =

Chinese footballer

Feng Jin 冯劲
Personal information
- Date of birth: 14 August 1993 (age 33)
- Place of birth: Chongqing, Sichuan, China
- Height: 1.75 m (5 ft 9 in)
- Position: Winger

Team information
- Current team: Dalian Yingbo (on loan from Shanghai Port)
- Number: 44

Senior career*
Years	Team	Apps	(Gls)
2013–2021	Chongqing Lifan	117	(6)
2022–	Shanghai Port	61	(5)
2023	→ Qingdao Hainiu (loan)	8	(0)
2026–	→ Dalian Yingbo (loan)	8	(1)

International career^{‡}
2019–	China	3	(0)
Medal record
Representing China
Men's football
EAFF Championship
Bronze medal – third place	2019 South Korea	Team
- * Club domestic league appearances and goals as of 19 November 2026 ‡ National team caps and goals as of 15 December 2019

Feng Jin (Chinese: 冯劲; pinyin: Féng Jìn; born 14 August 1993) is a Chinese professional footballer who plays as a winger for Chinese Super League club Dalian Yingbo, on loan from Shanghai Port.

== Club career ==
=== Chongqing Lifan ===
Feng Jin was promoted to Chongqing Lifan's first team squad in 2013 by the head coach Wang Baoshan. He would make his debut in a Chinese FA Cup game against Xinjiang Youth on 24 April 2013 in a 4–1 victory. He would go on to make his league debut against Henan Jianye in a 2–1 defeat on 6 October 2013. The following season Feng was used sparingly throughout the season, however he was part of the squad that went on to win the division championship and promotion back into the top tier.

On 16 May 2015, he made his Super League debut in a 2–1 home win against Changchun Yatai, coming on as a substitute for Zhang Chiming in the 83rd minute. On 24 June 2015, Feng scored his first Chinese Super League goal in a 3–0 away win against Tianjin Teda. Feng established himself as regular within the team until the club was dissolved on 24 May 2022 due to financial difficulties.

=== Shanghai Port ===
On 31 May 2022, Feng joined fellow top-tier club Shanghai Port for the start of the 2022 Chinese Super League campaign. On 4 June 2022, he made his debut for the club in the opening league game of the season against Wuhan Yangtze River that ended in a 1–0 defeat. On 15 June 2022, he scored his first goal for the club in a 1–0 victory against Guangzhou FC

During the 2023 season, Feng fell out of favour under new manager Javier Pereira, and joined fellow Chinese Super League club Qingdao Hainiu on 30 July for the rest of the season. After returning to Shanghai Port in 2024, Feng re-established himself as an integral member of the team and helped the team complete a domestic double. On 28 February 2026, Feng was loaned to Chinese Super League club Dalian Yingbo.

== International career ==
Feng made his debut for China national football team on 7 June 2019 in a 2–0 home win against Philippines in an international friendly game, as a 74th-minute substitute for Li Lei.

== Career statistics ==
=== Club ===
As of match played 19 June 2026

Appearances and goals by club, season and competition
Club	Season	League			National Cup		Continental		Other		Total	
Club	Season	Division	Apps	Goals	Apps	Goals	Apps	Goals	Apps	Goals	Apps	Goals
Chongqing Lifan	2013	China League One	3	0	2	0	–		–		5	0
Chongqing Lifan	2014	China League One	3	0	1	0	–		–		4	0
Chongqing Lifan	2015	Chinese Super League	19	1	1	0	–		–		20	1
Chongqing Lifan	2016	Chinese Super League	15	0	1	0	–		–		16	0
Chongqing Lifan	2017	Chinese Super League	15	1	1	0	–		–		16	1
Chongqing Lifan	2018	Chinese Super League	20	1	2	1	–		–		22	2
Chongqing Lifan	2019	Chinese Super League	27	3	1	0	–		–		28	3
Chongqing Lifan	2020	Chinese Super League	15	0	1	0	–		–		16	3
Chongqing Lifan	2021	Chinese Super League	20	4	0	0	–		–		20	4
Chongqing Lifan	Total		137	10	10	1	0	0	0	0	147	11
Shanghai Port	2022	Chinese Super League	22	2	4	2	–		–		26	4
Shanghai Port	2023	Chinese Super League	3	0	1	0	–		–		4	0
Shanghai Port	2024	Chinese Super League	26	2	5	1	4 (Note: Appearance in AFC Champions League Elite)	0	1 (Note: Appearance in Chinese Super Cup)	0	36	3
Shanghai Port	2025	Chinese Super League	10	1	2	0	5	0	1	0	18	1
Shanghai Port	2026	Chinese Super League	–		–		2	0	–		2	0
Shanghai Port	Total		61	5	12	3	11	0	2	0	86	8
Qingdao Hainiu (loan)	2023	Chinese Super League	8	0	2	0	–		–		10	0
Dalian Yingbo (loan)	2026	Chinese Super League	6	1	1	0	–		–		7	1
Career total			212	16	25	4	11	0	2	0	250	20

=== International ===
Scores and results list China's goal tally first.

No.	Date	Venue	Opponent	Score	Result	Competition

== Honours ==
=== Club ===
Chongqing Lifan

- China League One: 2014.

Shanghai Port

- Chinese Super League: 2023, 2024, 2025
- Chinese FA Cup: 2024

Dalian Yingbo

- Chinese Super League: 2026
