= Ablahan Haliq =

Chinese association football player

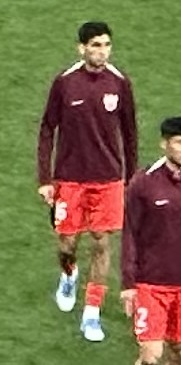
- Ablahan in May 2025

Personal information
- Date of birth: 26 April 2001 (age 25)
- Place of birth: Kashgar, Xinjiang, China
- Height: 1.86 m (6 ft 1 in)
- Position: Midfielder

Team information
- Current team: Henan FC
- Number: 15

Youth career
- –2020: Shaanxi FA
- 2020–2021: Henan Songshan Longmen

Senior career*
Years	Team	Apps	(Gls)
2021–2025	Shanghai Port	25	(1)
2020	→ China U20 (loan)	6	(2)
2024	→ Wuhan Three Towns (loan)	9	(0)
2026–	Henan FC	18	(0)

International career
2023–2024	China U23	6	(0)
- * Club domestic league appearances and goals as of 18 November 2026

Ablahan Haliq (Chinese: 阿布拉汗·哈力克; born 26 April 2001) is a Chinese footballer of Uyghur ethnicity who currently playing as a midfielder for Henan FC.

== Club career ==
On 12 March 2021, Ablahan Haliq would join top tier club Shanghai Port for the start of the 2021 Chinese Super League campaign. He would make his debut for the club in a league game on 22 April 2021 against Tianjin Jinmen Tiger in a 6-1 victory. This would be followed by his first goal for the club, which was on 6 August 2021, in a league game against Dalian Professional in a 5-0 victory.

On 21 February 2026, Ablahan Haliq returned to Henan FC.

== Career statistics ==
As of 31 January 2023.

Club	Season	League			Cup		Continental		Other		Total	
Club	Season	Division	Apps	Goals	Apps	Goals	Apps	Goals	Apps	Goals	Apps	Goals
Shanghai Port	2021	Chinese Super League	17	1	5	0	0	0	–		22	1
Shanghai Port	2022	Chinese Super League	3	0	4	1	–		–		7	1
Career total			20	1	9	1	0	0	0	0	29	2

== Honours ==
Shanghai Port

- Chinese Super League: 2023, 2025
