= Afrden Asqer =

Chinese association football player

Personal information
- Date of birth: 15 September 2003 (age 23)
- Place of birth: Kashgar, Xinjiang, China
- Height: 1.75 m (5 ft 9 in)
- Position: Forward

Team information
- Current team: Qingdao West Coast (on loan from Shanghai Port)
- Number: 27

Youth career
- –2017: Shaanxi Laochenggen
- 2017: Shimizu S-Pulse
- 2017–2018: Kashima Antlers
- 2018–2020: Guangzhou Evergrande

Senior career*
| Years | Team | Apps | (Gls) |
| 2020–2024 | Guangzhou FC | 33 | (3) |
| 2020 | → China U19 (loan) | 8 | (3) |
| 2021 | → China U20 (loan) | 3 | (0) |
| 2021 | → Suzhou Dongwu (loan) | 24 | (2) |
| 2023 | → Mjällby AIF (loan) | 0 | (0) |
| 2024 | → Wuhan Three Towns (loan) | 16 | (0) |
| 2025– | Shanghai Port | 1 | (0) |
| 2025 | → Changchun Yatai (loan) | 11 | (1) |
| 2026– | → Qingdao West Coast (loan) | 8 | (0) |

International career^{‡}
| 2017–2018 | China U16 | 4 | (1) |
| 2019–2023 | China U20 | 10 | (0) |
| 2023–2025 | China U23 | 11 | (2) |
- * Club domestic league appearances and goals as of 19 November 2026 ‡ National team caps and goals as of 14:01, 27 July 2021 (UTC)

Afrden Asqer (Chinese: 艾菲尔丁·艾斯卡尔; Uyghur: أفردن أسقر; born 15 September 2003) is a Chinese professional footballer who plays as a forward for Chinese Super League club Qingdao West Coast, on loan from Shanghai Port.

== Club career ==
=== Early career ===
Born in Kashgar, Xinjiang, trained in Xi'an, Shaanxi, Afrden played for Shaanxi Laochenggen until 2017, when he moved to Japan to sign for Shimizu S-Pulse. While in Japan, he also played for Kashima Antlers.

In 2018, he returned to China to join the youth ranks of Guangzhou FC. Afrden went on to represent the China under-19 and under-20 teams in the China League Two in 2020 and 2021.

=== 2021 season ===
While also representing the China under-20 select in League Two, Afrden also played for Suzhou Dongwu in League One, again on loan from Guangzhou.

In March 2023, Afrden signed for Allsvenskan club Mjällby AIF on loan for the 2023 season with the option to make the move permanent.

=== Shanghai Port ===
On 6 January 2025, Guangzhou FC failed to acquire the entry permission into the 2025 league due to historical debts, all players were released as free agents. On 27 January 2025, Afrden signed Chinese Super League club Shanghai Port.

On 2 March 2026, Afrden was loaned to Qingdao West Coast for the 2026 season.

== Career statistics ==
=== Club ===
As of 27 July 2021.

| Club | Season | League | | | Cup | | Continental | | Other | | Total | |
| Club | Season | Division | Apps | Goals | Apps | Goals | Apps | Goals | Apps | Goals | Apps | Goals |
|---|---|---|---|---|---|---|---|---|---|---|---|---|
| Guangzhou FC | 2020 | Chinese Super League | 0 | 0 | 0 | 0 | – | | 0 | 0 | 0 | 0 |
| Guangzhou FC | 2021 | Chinese Super League | 0 | 0 | 0 | 0 | – | | 0 | 0 | 0 | 0 |
| Guangzhou FC | Total | | 0 | 0 | 0 | 0 | 0 | 0 | 0 | 0 | 0 | 0 |
| China U19 (loan) | 2020 | China League Two | 8 | 3 | 0 | 0 | – | | 0 | 0 | 8 | 3 |
| China U20 (loan) | 2021 | China League Two | 3 | 0 | 0 | 0 | – | | 0 | 0 | 3 | 0 |
| Suzhou Dongwu (loan) | 2021 | China League One | 24 | 2 | 0 | 0 | – | | 0 | 0 | 24 | 2 |
| Career total | | | 35 | 5 | 0 | 0 | 0 | 0 | 0 | 0 | 35 | 5 |
