= Pudong Football Stadium =

Association football stadium in Shanghai, China

Coordinates: 31°14′26″N 121°36′25″E

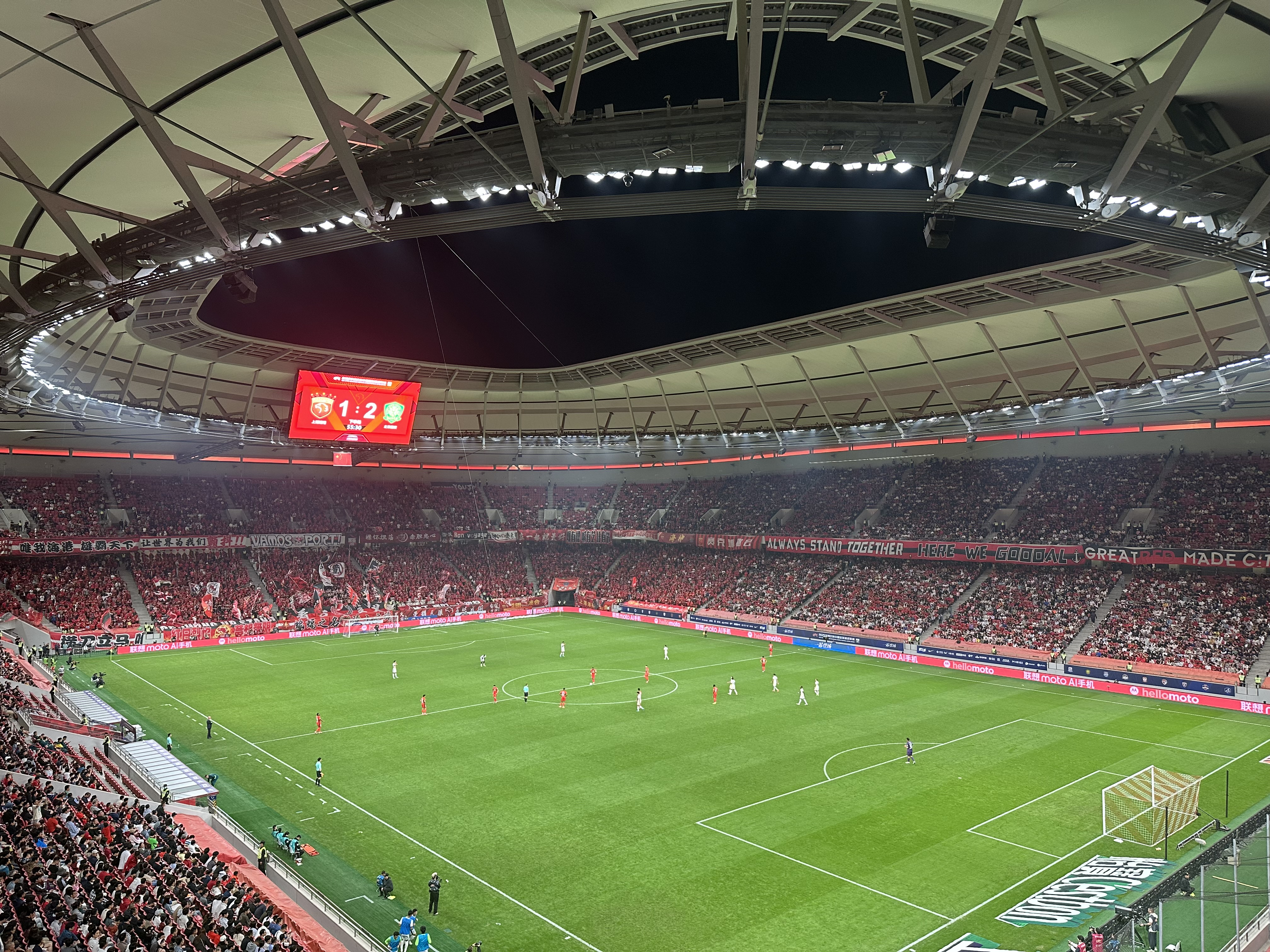
- Pudong Football Stadium in 2025
- Interactive map of Pudong Football Stadium
- Location: Pudong, Shanghai, China
- Owner: Shanghai Sports Bureau
- Capacity: 37,000
- Surface: Grass
- Public transit: 14 at Pudong Football Stadium

Construction
- Groundbreaking: 28 April 2018
- Opened: 31 October 2020
- Architect: HPP Architekten

Tenant
- Shanghai Port (2023–present)

The Pudong Football Stadium, currently named SAIC Motor Pudong Arena due to sponsorship reasons, is a football stadium in Shanghai, China. Completed in October 2020, it is the home of Chinese Super League club Shanghai Port. The stadium has a capacity of 37,000.

== Construction ==
Construction began on 28 April 2018 according to the construction plans of HPP Architekten. The white metal exterior design of the stadium is based on reminiscent of a Chinese porcelain bowl.

Exterior of the stadium

== Events ==
On 4 June 2019, China was announced as the host of the 2023 AFC Asian Cup. It was subsequently reported that the final and one semi-final would be held at the venue. However, in May 2022, China withdrew from hosting the tournament due to the COVID-19 pandemic in China.

On 31 October 2020, the venue hosted the final match of the 2020 League of Legends World Championship, which was also the inaugural event at the stadium.

Preceded by AccorHotels Arena; Paris	League of Legends World Championship; Final Venue; 2020	Succeeded by Laugardalshöll
