= Hunan Football League =

Football league in China

- Founded: 2016; 10 years ago
- First season: 2016
- Country: China
- Divisions: 1
- Number of clubs: 14
- Current champions: Yongzhou (2025)
- Current: 2026

The Hunan Football League (simplified Chinese: 湖南省足球联赛; traditional Chinese: 湖南省足球聯賽; pinyin: Húnán Shěng Zúqiú Liánsài), commonly known as the Xiang Super League or Xiang Chao (simplified Chinese: 湘超联赛; traditional Chinese: 湘超聯賽; pinyin: Xiāng Chāo Liánsài), is a provincial football league organized by the Hunan Provincial Sports Bureau and administered by the Hunan Football Association. The league was officially launched in 2016.

== History ==
=== Club-based era (2016–2023) ===
The inaugural 2016 season was held from June to September, with eight teams competing. Changsha Sihai Louxiaoer won the championship after defeating Hengyang Runfeng 4–0 on 17 September 2016. The team finished the season with 11 wins and 3 draws.

The 2017 season concluded with Hunan Sports Lottery winning the championship, followed by Changsha Sihai as runners-up and Hunan Broadcasting System Mango Ba in third place.

The 2021 season was held from December 2021 to January 2022, with Xiangtan Lingdian winning its first championship after defeating Hunan Muming Junyao 4–3 on penalties following a 1–1 draw in regular time. In the third-place match, Hunan Sports Lottery defeated Hunan Broadcasting System Mango Ba 5–1.

The 2022 season was held from November 2022 to March 2023, with six teams competing in a single round-robin format. Changsha Xiaoxiang Xingcheng won the title with five wins from five matches, earning 15 points.

The 2023 season was held from 30 December 2023 to 20 January 2024, with eight teams competing. Zhongnan Pingjiang Zhixing won the championship after defeating Zhongnan Yaoji 2–0 in the final on 20 January 2024, with Gao Xiang scoring both goals. The team achieved five wins from five matches.

=== City-based era (2025–present) ===
In 2025, the league was restructured to feature teams representing all 14 prefecture-level cities in Hunan Province. According to the competition regulations issued by the Hunan Provincial Sports Bureau, the league's English name is Hunan Football League, abbreviated as HNFL.

On the evening of 7 September 2025, the opening ceremony of the 2025 Hunan Football League was held at Changsha Stadium. Mao Weiming, Deputy Secretary of the Provincial Party Committee and Governor, declared the league open. Provincial leaders Wu Guiying, Zhang Yingchun, Zhang Jianfei, Jiang Difei, Li Min, and Provincial Government Secretary-General Qu Hai attended.

The opening match was between Changsha and Loudi, with Changsha winning 2–0. In the 60th minute, Li Zhangyu of Changsha scored the first goal of the league with a header from a corner kick taken by Yang Ke. In the 87th minute, Yang Ke converted a penalty to seal the victory.

The 2025 season ran from September to December, lasting 17 weeks, with 98 matches played across stadiums in all 14 prefecture-level cities of Hunan. Matches were held on Fridays, Saturdays, and Sundays.

On 27 December 2025, the final was held at Changsha Helong Stadium. Yongzhou defeated Changde 1–0 to win the 2025 Hunan Football League championship. In the 58th minute of the second half, Yongzhou defender Gu Wenjie (#46) scored the winning goal with a header from a corner kick scramble. He Baoxiang, Vice Chairman of the National Committee of the Chinese People's Political Consultative Conference, attended the match, and Governor Mao Weiming presented the championship trophy to Yongzhou. A total of 43,695 spectators attended the final.

According to data released by the organizing committee, the 2025 season covered 4.47 billion person-times of internet users before the final, with over 2.31 million spectators attending matches on-site. The 98 matches of the 2025 season attracted 2.4135 million spectators on-site and directly drove Hunan's cultural and tourism consumption of 136.79 billion yuan.

The 2026 season commenced on 25 July 2026, with Changsha defeating defending champions Yongzhou 4–0 in the opening match at Changsha Helong Stadium. Governor Mao Weiming attended the match.

== Format ==
=== 2025 season ===
The 2025 season adopted a two-stage format of "Regular Season + Knockout Stage". The regular season used a single round-robin format, with 14 teams playing 13 rounds. Each team played either 7 home and 6 away matches or 6 home and 7 away matches, determined by draw. The top eight teams from the regular season advanced to the knockout stage.

The competition regulations stipulated that all registered athletes must be older than 16 and not exceed 40 years of age, with each team allowed to register 1 to 2 overage players. Each team was required to have at least 3 high school student players on the field simultaneously during each match.

=== 2026 season ===
The 2026 season maintained the regular season plus knockout stage format. The quarterfinals and semi-finals were changed to a two-legged format. If the aggregate score was tied, the match would proceed directly to a penalty shootout. The final remained a single-match format.

The 2026 season features 104 matches, with 91 regular season matches and 13 knockout matches. Each team continued to use the "3+1" substitution rule, but the number of substitutes allowed was reduced from 12 to 7. Red and yellow cards accumulated during the regular season did not carry over into the knockout stage.

The league required each team to have at least 20 high school student players and at least 3 high school student players on the field simultaneously during each match.

== Seasons ==
=== Club-based era ===
Hunan Football Association Super League seasons (club-based era)
Season	Teams	Champions	Runners-up	Third place	Fourth place
2016	8	Changsha Sihai Louxiaoer	Hunan Sports Lottery	Hunan Broadcasting System Mango Ba	Chenzhou Shenghe
2017	8	Hunan Sports Lottery	Changsha Sihai	Hunan Broadcasting System Mango Ba	Hunan Boyi Lvyin
2018	8	Hunan Broadcasting System Mango Ba	Changsha Sihai	Hunan Boyi Lvyin	Hunan Sports Lottery
2021	7	Xiangtan Lingdian	Hunan Muming Junyao	Hunan Sports Lottery	Hunan Broadcasting System Mango Ba
2022	6	Changsha Xiaoxiang Xingcheng	Hunan Tianyue Yong Pingjiang Zhixing	Hunan Sports Lottery	Muming Group – Changsha University of Science and Technology
2023	8	Zhongnan Pingjiang Zhixing	Zhongnan Yaoji	Changsha Xiaohe Xingchen	Liling Yuesheng

=== City-based era ===
Hunan Football League seasons (city-based era)
Season	Teams	Champions	Runners-up	Third place	Fourth place
2025	14	Yongzhou	Changde	Changsha	Zhuzhou
2026	14	In progress			

== Media coverage and impact ==
The 2025 season covered 4.47 billion person-times of internet users before the final, with 2.31 million spectators attending matches on-site.

During the 2025 season, Yongzhou's home stadium gained attention for its limited seating capacity, with fans climbing trees or standing on bricks to watch matches.

== See also ==
- Chinese Football Association Member Association Champions League
- Chinese Super League
- Jiangsu Football City League
- Shandong Qilu Football Super League
- Sichuan City Football League
