= 2011 Chinese Super League =

Chinese Super League
- Season: 2011
- Champions: Guangzhou Evergrande (1st title)
- Champions League: Guangzhou Evergrande; Beijing Guoan; Liaoning Whowin (withdrew); Tianjin TEDA (via FA Cup)
- Matches: 240
- Goals: 564 (2.35 per match)
- Top goalscorer: Muriqui (16 goals)
- Biggest home win: Liaoning 6–1 Shenzhen (18 Jun); Guangzhou 5–0 Nanchang (14 Jul)
- Biggest away win: Chengdu 0–4 Liaoning (11 Jun)
- Highest scoring: Liaoning 6–1 Shenzhen (18 Jun); Nanchang 2–5 Shandong (24 Sep); Jiangsu 5–2 Guangzhou (22 Oct)
- Longest winning run: 7 games Guangzhou Evergrande
- Longest unbeaten run: 23 games Guangzhou Evergrande (16W 7D)
- Longest losing run: 5 games Shenzhen Ruby, Shanghai Shenhua
- Highest attendance: 53,375; Beijing vs Guangzhou
- Lowest attendance: 2,011; Qingdao vs Changchun
- Average attendance: 17,651

The 2011 Chinese Super League (also known as Pirelli Chinese Super League for sponsorship reasons) was the eighth season since the establishment of the Chinese Super League, the eighteenth season of a professional association football league and the 50th top-tier league season in China. Guangzhou Evergrande clinched their first ever Chinese Super League title on September 28, 2011.

== Promotion and relegation ==
Teams promoted from 2010 China League One

- Guangzhou Evergrande
- Chengdu Blades

Teams relegated to 2011 China League One

- Chongqing Lifan
- Changsha Ginde (renamed to Shenzhen Phoenix)

== Clubs ==
=== Personnel and locations ===
Club	Head coach	City	Stadium	Capacity	2010 season
Beijing Guoan	(Portugal) Jaime Pacheco	Beijing	Workers' Stadium	66,161	5th
Changchun Yatai	(China) Shen Xiangfu	Changchun, Jilin	Development Area Stadium	25,000	9th
Chengdu Blades ^{P}	(Scotland) Lawrie McKinna	Chengdu, Sichuan	Chengdu Sports Centre	39,225	CL1, 2nd
Dalian Shide	(Portugal) Nelo Vingada	Dalian, Liaoning	Jinzhou Stadium	30,775	6th
Guangzhou Evergrande ^{P}	(South Korea) Lee Jang-soo	Guangzhou, Guangdong	Tianhe Stadium	60,161	CL1, 1st
Hangzhou Greentown	(China) Wu Jingui	Hangzhou, Zhejiang	Meihu Sports Centre (Round 1 to 14); Jiaxing Stadium (Round 17 to 30)	35,260; 35,000	4th
Henan Jianye	(Netherlands) Jo Bonfrère	Zhengzhou, Henan	Hanghai Stadium	28,000	8th
Jiangsu Sainty	(Serbia) Dragan Okuka	Nanjing, Jiangsu	Nanjing Olympic Sports Center	61,443	11th
Liaoning Whowin	(China) Ma Lin	Shenyang, Liaoning	Tiexi New District Sports Center	30,000	7th
Nanchang Hengyuan	(China) Zhu Jiong	Nanchang, Jiangxi	Nanchang Bayi Stadium	26,000	13th
Qingdao Jonoon	(South Korea) Chang Woe-ryong	Qingdao, Shandong	Qingdao Tiantai Stadium	20,525	14th
Shaanxi Renhe	(China) Gao Hongbo	Xi'an, Shaanxi	Shaanxi Province Stadium	47,565	10th
Shandong Luneng ^{TH}	(Portugal) Manuel Barbosa	Jinan, Shandong	Shandong Provincial Stadium	43,700	1st
Shanghai Shenhua	(Croatia) Dražen Besek	Shanghai	Hongkou Stadium	33,060	3rd
Shenzhen Ruby	(France) Philippe Troussier	Shenzhen, Guangdong	Shenzhen Stadium	32,500	12th
Tianjin TEDA	(Netherlands) Arie Haan	Tianjin	TEDA Football Stadium; Tianjin Olympic Center Stadium (Round 24, 26 & 28)	36,390; 60,000	2nd

Location of teams in 2011 Chinese Super League

=== Managerial changes ===
Team	Outgoing manager	Manner of departure	Date of vacancy	Table	Incoming manager	Date of appointment
Henan Jianye	(China) Tang Yaodong	Sacked	11 November 2010	N/A	(South Korea) Kim Hak-bum	27 November 2010
Jiangsu Sainty	(China) Pei Encai	Sacked	30 November 2010	N/A	(Slovakia) Ján Kocian	8 December 2010
Shanghai Shenhua	(Croatia) Miroslav Blažević	End of contract	11 December 2010	N/A	(China) Xi Zhikang	12 December 2010
Beijing Guoan	(China) Wei Kexing	Sacked	21 December 2010	N/A	(Portugal) Jaime Pacheco	4 January 2011
Qingdao Jonoon	(China) Guo Kanfeng	Sacked	29 December 2010	N/A	(South Korea) Chang Woe-ryong	16 January 2011
Shenzhen Ruby	(Cyprus) Siniša Gogić	End of contract	31 December 2010	N/A	(France) Philippe Troussier	22 February 2011
Chengdu Blades	(China) Wang Baoshan	Sacked	31 December 2010	N/A	(Scotland) Lawrie McKinna	19 March 2011
Jiangsu Sainty	(Slovakia) Ján Kocian	Sacked	5 May 2011	15th	(Serbia) Dragan Okuka	10 May 2011
Shandong Luneng	(Croatia) Branko Ivanković	Resigned	5 May 2011	8th	(Croatia) Rajko Magić	5 May 2011
Henan Jianye	(South Korea) Kim Hak-bum	Sacked	5 May 2011	8th	(China) Zhao Wei (caretaker)	23 May 2011
Dalian Shide	(South Korea) Park Sung-hwa	Sacked	29 May 2011	12th	(China) Li Xicai (caretaker)	29 May 2011
Dalian Shide	(China) Li Xicai (caretaker)	Caretaking spell over	31 May 2011	12th	(China) Gai Zengjun (caretaker)	31 May 2011
Henan Jianye	(China) Zhao Wei (caretaker)	Caretaking spell over	29 June 2011	15th	(Netherlands) Jo Bonfrère	29 June 2011
Shaanxi Renhe	(Serbia) Milorad Kosanović	Sacked	19 July 2011	5th	(Serbia) Slobodan Santrač	20 July 2011
Dalian Shide	(China) Gai Zengjun (caretaker)	Caretaking spell over	20 July 2011	12th	(Portugal) Nelo Vingada	20 July 2011
Shanghai Shenhua	(China) Xi Zhikang	Sacked	10 August 2011	9th	(Croatia) Dražen Besek	10 August 2011
Shandong Luneng	(Croatia) Rajko Magić	Resigned	17 September 2011	7th	(Portugal) Manuel Barbosa	17 September 2011
Shaanxi Renhe	(Serbia) Slobodan Santrač	Sacked	24 September 2011	10th	(China) Gao Hongbo	24 September 2011

=== Foreign players ===
The number of foreign players is restricted to five per CSL team, including a slot for a player from AFC countries. A team can use four foreign players on the field in each game, including at least one player from the AFC country. Players from Hong Kong, Macau and Chinese Taipei are deemed to be native players in CSL.

- Players name in **bold** indicates the player was registered during the mid-season transfer window.
- Players in italics were out of the squad or left the club within the season, after the pre-season transfer window, or in the mid-season transfer window, and at least had one appearance.

Club	Player 1	Player 2	Player 3	Player 4	AFC player	Former players
Beijing Guoan	(Croatia) Darko Matić	(Honduras) Walter Martinez	(Senegal) **François**	(Senegal) **Ladji Keita**	(Australia) Joel Griffiths	(Brazil) Davi (Brazil) Roberto
Changchun Yatai	(Brazil) Dori	(Brazil) Nei	(Cameroon) **Modeste M'bami**	(Colombia) **Yovanny Arrechea**	(Uzbekistan) Anzur Ismailov	(Brazil) Sávio (Brazil) Welton (Serbia) Radomir Koković
Chengdu Blades	(Colombia) **Javier Estupiñán**	(Ivory Coast) Jonas Salley	(Malta) **John Hutchinson**		(Australia) **Brendon Santalab**	(Argentina) Bruno Casanova (Australia) Adam Kwasnik
Dalian Shide	(Brazil) **Adriano**	(Bulgaria) Martin Kamburov	(South Korea) Ahn Jung-hwan	(Zambia) James Chamanga	(Uzbekistan) **Murod Kholmukhamedov**	(South Korea) Jeon Kwang-jin (South Korea) Kim Jin-kyu
Guangzhou Evergrande	(Argentina) **Darío Conca**	(Brazil) Cléo	(Brazil) Muriqui	(Brazil) Paulão	(South Korea) Cho Won-hee	(Brazil) Renato Cajá
Hangzhou Greentown	(Honduras) Luis Ramírez	(Honduras) **Randy Diamond**	(Uruguay) Paulo Pezzolano	(Uruguay) Sebastián Vázquez	(Australia) Adam Griffiths	(Uruguay) Matías Masiero
Henan Jianye	(Argentina) **Marcos Flores**	(Brazil) Fabão	(Brazil) Leandro Netto	(Zambia) **Christopher Katongo**	(South Korea) **Lee Jun-yeob**	(Brazil) Rômulo (Brazil) Thiago Potiguar
Jiangsu Sainty	(Brazil) Eleílson	(Peru) Paolo de la Haza	(Romania) Cristian Dănălache	(Serbia) **Aleksandar Jevtić**	(Uzbekistan) **Kamoliddin Tajiev**	(Australia) Alex Wilkinson (Australia) Bruce Djite
Liaoning Whowin	(Australia) Dean Heffernan	(Brazil) Valdo	(Cameroon) Jean Michel N'Lend	(Serbia) Vladimir Bogdanović	(South Korea) Kim Yoo-jin	
Nanchang Hengyuan	(Brazil) **Camilo**	(Brazil) Johnny	(Brazil) **Paulão**	(Brazil) **Paulo Roberto**	(South Korea) Ko Jae-sung	(Brazil) Tozin (Uruguay) Diego Vera (Uruguay) Jonathan Ramis
Qingdao Jonoon	(Brazil) Éber	(Brazil) Léo San	(Nigeria) Gabriel Melkam		(Uzbekistan) **Aziz Ibragimov**	(Uzbekistan) Ildar Magdeev
Shaanxi Renhe	(Brazil) Wilson	(Italy) Fabio Firmani	(Scotland) **Derek Riordan**	(Serbia) Miloš Bajalica	(Bosnia and Herzegovina) Dino Djulbic^{1}	(Slovakia) Tomáš Oravec
Shandong Luneng	(Brazil) **Fabiano**	(Brazil) Obina	(Cape Verde) Ricardo	(Honduras) Julio César de León	(Lebanon) Roda Antar	(Brazil) Renato Silva
Shanghai Shenhua	(Argentina) Facundo Pérez Castro	(Argentina) Luis Salmerón	(Colombia) **Eisner Loboa**	(Colombia) Juan Camilo Angulo		(Colombia) Duvier Riascos (Syria) Abdulkader Dakka
Shenzhen Ruby	(Bolivia) **Ronald Rivero**	(Honduras) **Rony Flores**	(New Zealand) Chris Killen	(Slovenia) Janez Zavrl	(Japan) Takashi Rakuyama	(Colombia) Jair Reinoso (Japan) Seiichiro Maki (Slovenia) Ermin Rakovič
Tianjin TEDA	(Argentina) Luciano Olguín	(Romania) **Marius Bilaşco**	(Serbia) Marko Zorić		(South Korea) Song Chong-gug	(Nigeria) Obiora Odita (South Korea) Kwon Jip

Hong Kong/Chinese Taipei/Macau players (doesn't count on the foreign player slot)

Club	Player 1
Shenzhen Ruby	(Hong Kong) Andy Nägelein

^1 Dino Djulbic has Australian citizenship and therefore was counted as Asian player.

== League table ==
Pos	Team	Pld	W	D	L	GF	GA	GD	Pts	Qualification or relegation
1	Guangzhou Evergrande (C)	30	20	8	2	67	23	+44	68	AFC Champions League group stage
2	Beijing Guoan	30	14	11	5	49	21	+28	53	AFC Champions League group stage
3	Liaoning Whowin	30	14	8	8	38	23	+15	50	AFC Champions League qualifying play-off (Note: Liaoning Whowin qualified for the 2012 AFC Champions League but withdrew from the tournament.)
4	Jiangsu Sainty	30	14	5	11	43	28	+15	47 (Note: Jiangsu, 3 pts, 2–1; Shandong, 3 pts, 1–2)	
5	Shandong Luneng	30	13	8	9	37	31	+6	47	
6	Qingdao Jonoon	30	12	9	9	37	33	+4	45 (Note: Qingdao, 3 pts, 2–1; Changchun, 3 pts, 1–2)	
7	Changchun Yatai	30	11	12	7	33	31	+2	45	
8	Hangzhou Greentown	30	10	9	11	28	32	−4	39	
9	Shaanxi Renhe	30	10	8	12	34	41	−7	38	
10	Tianjin TEDA	30	8	13	9	37	41	−4	37 (Note: Tianjin, 3 pts, 2–2; Shanghai, 3 pts, 2–2)	2012 AFC Champions League Group stage (Note: Tianjin TEDA qualified for the 2012 AFC Champions League by winning the 2011 Chinese FA Cup.)
11	Shanghai Shenhua	30	11	4	15	31	41	−10	37	
12	Dalian Shide	30	7	11	12	27	43	−16	32 (Note: Dalian, 6 pts, 3–1; Henan, 0 pts, 1–3)	
13	Henan Jianye	30	7	11	12	29	35	−6	32	
14	Nanchang Hengyuan	30	8	5	17	20	41	−21	29	
15	Chengdu Blades (R)	30	5	12	13	27	47	−20	27	Relegation to China League One
16	Shenzhen Ruby (R)	30	5	8	17	27	53	−26	23	Relegation to China League One

Updated to match(es) played on 2 November 2011. Source: http://csl.sina.com.cn/statistics/
Rules for classification: 1st points; 2nd head-to-head points; 3rd head-to-head goal difference; 4th head-to-head goals scored; 5th goal difference; 6th goals scored; 7th disciplinary points (1 point for each yellow card, 3 points for each red card). Head-to-Head: used when head-to-head record is used to rank tied teams.
(C) Champions; (R) Relegated

== Positions by round ==
Team ╲ Round	1	2	3	4	5	6	7	8	9	10	11	12	13	14	15	16	17	18	19	20	21	22	23	24	25	26	27	28	29	30
Guangzhou Evergrande	4	5	5	5	2	1	1	1	2	1	1	1	1	1	1	1	1	1	1	1	1	1	1	1	1	1	1	1	1	1
Beijing Guoan	3	7	9	6	3	3	3	3	1	2	2	2	2	2	2	2	2	2	2	2	2	2	2	2	2	2	2	2	2	2
Liaoning Whowin	16	9	4	2	6	4	4	4	5	4	3	4	4	3	3	3	3	4	3	4	3	3	3	4	3	3	3	3	3	3
Jiangsu Sainty	15	16	15	15	15	15	13	14	13	13	11	12	11	11	11	11	11	8	8	6	9	9	6	6	5	5	5	5	4	4
Shandong Luneng	7	3	6	8	8	8	8	9	7	7	6	6	3	4	4	4	4	3	4	3	4	4	7	7	6	6	6	6	5	5
Qingdao Jonoon	9	4	8	11	9	7	7	8	8	9	9	9	9	10	10	10	9	11	11	11	10	10	10	10	9	9	8	7	6	6
Changchun Yatai	5	8	11	9	10	10	11	11	11	11	10	10	10	8	8	9	8	10	7	5	5	6	4	3	4	4	4	4	7	7
Hangzhou Greentown	2	1	1	3	1	2	2	2	4	5	5	5	6	7	7	8	10	6	6	8	8	5	8	8	8	8	7	8	8	8
Shaanxi Renhe	1	2	2	1	5	5	6	5	9	6	7	7	7	5	5	5	6	5	5	7	6	7	9	9	10	10	10	10	10	9
Tianjin TEDA	6	6	3	4	7	9	10	7	6	8	8	8	8	9	9	6	5	7	9	9	7	8	5	5	7	7	9	9	9	10
Shanghai Shenhua	10	11	7	7	4	6	5	6	3	3	4	3	5	6	6	7	7	9	10	10	11	11	11	12	12	12	13	13	11	11
Dalian Shide	13	13	10	10	12	12	12	12	12	12	12	13	13	12	14	12	13	14	13	13	14	13	13	13	13	13	12	12	13	12
Henan Jianye	11	12	13	14	14	14	15	16	15	15	14	15	14	14	12	13	12	12	12	12	12	12	12	11	11	11	11	11	12	13
Nanchang Hengyuan	14	14	14	12	13	13	14	15	14	14	15	16	16	15	13	14	14	13	14	14	15	14	14	14	14	14	14	14	14	14
Chengdu Blades	8	10	12	13	11	11	9	10	10	10	13	11	12	13	15	15	16	16	16	16	16	16	16	16	16	16	16	15	15	15
Shenzhen Ruby	12	15	16	16	16	16	16	13	16	16	16	14	15	16	16	16	15	15	15	15	13	15	15	15	15	15	15	16	16	16

Leader and qualification to AFC Champions League Group stage
Qualification to AFC Champions League Group stage
Qualification to AFC Champions League Qualifying play-off
Relegation to League One

Source: Results by round

== Results ==
Home \ Away	BJ	CC	CD	DL	GZ	HZ	HN	JS	LN	NC	QD	SX	SD	SH	SZ	TJ
Beijing Guoan		4–1	3–1	3–0	1–1	1–3	3–0	2–1	0–0	1–0	2–0	2–3	1–1	3–0	4–0	1–1
Changchun Yatai	2–1		1–1	2–2	2–1	1–1	0–0	1–0	0–0	0–2	0–2	3–0	1–1	0–0	2–1	3–3
Chengdu Blades	0–3	2–2		0–0	2–2	2–0	0–2	0–0	0–4	0–1	0–0	1–3	1–2	2–0	2–2	1–1
Dalian Shide	0–0	1–1	2–0		1–3	1–1	2–1	0–3	1–1	2–1	3–2	1–0	0–3	1–2	0–0	1–1
Guangzhou Evergrande	2–2	1–1	4–0	1–0		3–0	3–1	2–1	2–1	5–0	4–0	2–0	2–0	3–0	4–1	4–0
Hangzhou Greentown	0–0	2–0	1–1	0–0	1–3		1–2	1–0	1–0	2–0	1–0	0–0	1–0	1–0	2–1	1–2
Henan Jianye	1–1	0–1	2–3	0–1	1–1	0–0		0–0	2–1	2–0	4–1	1–0	1–1	1–2	0–0	0–0
Jiangsu Sainty	0–2	1–0	1–0	4–0	5–2	2–0	1–1		0–1	1–0	3–1	1–0	2–0	3–2	3–0	2–2
Liaoning Whowin	0–0	1–0	1–0	3–0	1–1	1–0	2–0	2–4		1–0	0–0	1–0	0–1	1–0	6–1	2–0
Nanchang Hengyuan	0–3	0–1	1–0	1–0	1–1	1–0	0–0	0–1	1–2		0–0	2–3	2–5	0–0	1–0	0–0
Qingdao Jonoon	1–0	0–1	0–0	2–1	0–2	3–1	1–1	1–0	2–0	4–1		0–1	2–0	2–1	2–0	3–0
Shaanxi Renhe	1–1	1–1	0–1	1–3	1–4	2–1	3–2	0–0	2–0	1–3	2–2		2–1	1–0	1–1	1–1
Shandong Luneng	1–1	1–0	3–3	0–0	0–0	1–2	1–0	1–0	2–1	1–0	0–1	2–1		2–0	2–0	1–1
Shanghai Shenhua	1–0	0–2	4–1	1–0	0–2	3–2	1–2	3–2	1–1	0–1	3–3	2–1	1–0		2–0	2–1
Shenzhen Ruby	0–3	1–2	2–2	4–2	0–1	0–0	2–1	2–1	1–1	2–1	1–1	0–1	2–3	2–0		1–2
Tianjin TEDA	0–1	1–2	0–1	2–2	0–1	2–2	3–1	2–1	1–3	3–0	1–1	2–2	3–1	1–0	1–0	

Updated to match(es) played on 2 November 2011. Source: Results on the official site of the Chinese Super League
Legend: Blue = home team win; Yellow = draw; Red = away team win.

== Goalscorers ==
Updated to games played on 2 November 2011.

Rank	Player	Club	Goals
1	(Brazil) Muriqui	Guangzhou Evergrande	16
2	(Brazil) Leandro Netto	Henan Jianye	14
3	(Romania) Cristian Dănălache	Jiangsu Sainty	13
4	(Argentina) Luis Salmerón	Shanghai Shenhua	12
4	(China) Yu Hanchao	Liaoning Whowin	12
6	(Australia) Joel Griffiths	Beijing Guoan	11
6	(China) Gao Lin	Guangzhou Evergrande	11
6	(Serbia) Aleksandar Jevtić	Jiangsu Sainty	11
9	(Brazil) Cléo	Guangzhou Evergrande	10
9	(Brazil) Obina	Shandong Luneng	10
9	(Bulgaria) Martin Kamburov	Dalian Shide	10
9	(Honduras) Walter Martínez	Beijing Guoan	10

== Awards ==
- Chinese Football Association Footballer of the Year: (Brazil) Muriqui (Guangzhou Evergrande)
- Chinese Football Association Young Player of the Year: (China) Song Wenjie (Qingdao Jonoon)
- Chinese Super League Golden Boot Winner: (Brazil) Muriqui (Guangzhou Evergrande)
- Chinese Football Association Manager of the Year: (China) Ma Lin (Liaoning Whowin)
- Chinese Football Association Referee of the Year: (China) Tan Hai (Beijing)
- Chinese Super League Fair Play Award: Henan Jianye, Nanchang Hengyuan, Shandong Luneng, Qingdao Jonoon, Jiangsu Sainty

== Attendances ==
=== League attendance ===
Pos	Team	Total	High	Low	Average	Change
1	Guangzhou Evergrande	684,991	50,389	35,856	45,666	n/a^{†}
2	Beijing Guoan	605,958	53,375	31,267	40,397	+21.2%
3	Shaanxi Renhe	417,538	39,996	11,336	27,836	−0.8%
4	Liaoning Whowin	294,319	25,812	11,917	19,621	+94.3%
5	Tianjin TEDA	273,629	43,986	6,999	18,242	+23.6%
6	Jiangsu Sainty	257,557	31,856	11,576	17,170	+61.0%
7	Dalian Shide	257,214	25,000	3,325	17,148	+39.3%
8	Henan Jianye	245,007	20,688	9,346	16,334	−12.3%
9	Changchun Yatai	207,531	28,669	5,500	13,835	+37.4%
10	Shandong Luneng	181,679	27,815	4,255	12,112	−23.8%
11	Nanchang Hengyuan	156,932	14,562	7,649	10,462	−10.4%
12	Shenzhen Ruby	154,154	24,500	4,118	10,277	−17.4%
13	Shanghai Shenhua	147,416	18,232	4,325	9,828	−24.2%
14	Hangzhou Greentown	128,787	16,786	2,681	8,586	−41.0%
15	Qingdao Jonoon	126,963	15,286	2,011	8,464	+35.5%
16	Chengdu Blades	96,647	20,000	2,465	6,443	n/a^{†}
	League total	4,236,322	53,375	2,011	17,651	+21.1%

Updated to games played on Nov 2, 2011
Source: CSLdata
Notes:
^{†} Team played previous season in CL1.

=== Top 10 attendances ===
Attendance	Round	Date	Home	Score	Away	Venue	Weekday	Time of Day
53,375	18	1 August 2011	Beijing Guoan	1–1	Guangzhou Evergrande	Workers' Stadium	Monday	Night
50,389	15	6 July 2011	Guangzhou Evergrande	4–0	Chengdu Blades	Tianhe Stadium	Wednesday	Night
50,000	1	2 April 2011	Guangzhou Evergrande	1–0	Dalian Shide	Tianhe Stadium	Saturday	Night
49,693	27	16 October 2011	Guangzhou Evergrande	3–0	Shanghai Shenhua	Tianhe Stadium	Sunday	Night
48,920	9	29 May 2011	Guangzhou Evergrande	1–1	Changchun Yatai	Tianhe Stadium	Sunday	Night
48,657	29	29 October 2011	Beijing Guoan	2–3	Shaanxi Chanba	Workers' Stadium	Saturday	Afternoon
48,500	17	14 July 2011	Guangzhou Evergrande	5–0	Nanchang Hengyuan	Tianhe Stadium	Thursday	Night
48,383	25	24 September 2011	Guangzhou Evergrande	4–0	Tianjin TEDA	Tianhe Stadium	Friday	Night
48,312	11	18 June 2011	Guangzhou Evergrande	2–0	Shaanxi Chanba	Tianhe Stadium	Saturday	Night
48,160	19	6 August 2011	Guangzhou Evergrande	4–0	Qingdao Jonoon	Tianhe Stadium	Saturday	Night
