= Suchao =

Suchao may refer to:

- Suchao Nuchnum, a Thai football player
- Jiangsu Football City League (苏超)
