= Li Zhiliang =

Chinese footballer

Personal information
- Date of birth: 18 June 2007 (age 19)
- Height: 1.93 m (6 ft 4 in)
- Position: Goalkeeper

Team information
- Current team: Shanghai Port
- Number: 53

Youth career
- 2013–2016: Sha Municipal Experimental Primary School
- 2016–2022: Hubei Province youth team
- 2022–2023: Dongtai Yanhai Anbeisi
- 2023–2024: Shanghai Port Youth

Senior career*
Years	Team	Apps	(Gls)
2024–2026	Shanghai Port B	34	(0)
2025–	Shanghai Port	0	(0)

International career^{‡}
2025–	China U18		
- * Club domestic league appearances and goals as of 16 October 2026 ‡ National team caps and goals as of 16 October 2026

Li Zhiliang (Chinese: 李智良; pinyin: Lǐ Zhìliáng; born 18 June 2007) is a Chinese professional footballer who plays as a goalkeeper for Chinese Super League club Shanghai Port.

== Early life and youth career ==
Li Zhiliang was born on 18 June 2007. He entered Jingzhou Sha Municipal Experimental Primary School in 2013. In 2016, he was selected for the Hubei Province youth football team.

=== Shanghai Port Youth and B Team ===
In 2023, Li Zhiliang signed with the Shanghai Port youth academy. In 2024, at the age of 16, he made his professional debut for the Shanghai Port B team, starting in a China League Two match against Shandong Taishan B. In 2025, Li Zhiliang was promoted to the Shanghai Port first team. He was given the squad number 53. From the winter training period onwards, he trained with the first team.

=== Loan to Yancheng ===
In 2025, Li Zhiliang was approved by club chairman Sun Xiang to join Jiangsu Yancheng team to participate in the "Su Super" league. He became the team's number one goalkeeper. During the season, his save success rate ranked in the top three of the Su Super league, and his number of clean sheets led the league. On 17 August 2025, he appeared as a starter for Yancheng in their Su Super match against Nanjing. In an interview after a match, Li Zhiliang said: "The goal is not just mine, it also belongs to all the people of Yancheng, we cannot let it down so easily."

== International career ==
In March 2025, Li Zhiliang was called up to the China U18 national youth team squad. On 16 August 2025, he was named in the China U18 squad for a training camp in Baotou and the 33rd China-Japan-Korea Youth Sports Games, preparing for the 2026 AFC U-20 Asian Cup qualifiers. This was his third call-up to the national youth team.

== Career statistics ==
=== Club ===
As of 16 October 2026

Appearances and goals by club, season and competition
Club	Season	League			National Cup		Continental		Other		Total	
Club	Season	Division	Apps	Goals	Apps	Goals	Apps	Goals	Apps	Goals	Apps	Goals
Shanghai Port B	2024	China League Two	1	0	—		—		—		1	0
Shanghai Port B	2025	China League Two	17	0	—		—		—		17	0
Shanghai Port B	2026	China League Two	17	0	—		—		—		17	0
Yancheng (loan)	2025	Su Super	7	0	—		—		—		7	0
Shanghai Port	2025	Chinese Super League	0	0	0	0	0	0	0	0	0	0
Career total			51	0	0	0	0	0	0	0	51	0

== Honours ==
Shanghai Port

- Chinese Super League: 2025
