= He Yiran =

Chinese footballer

He Yiran 贺一然
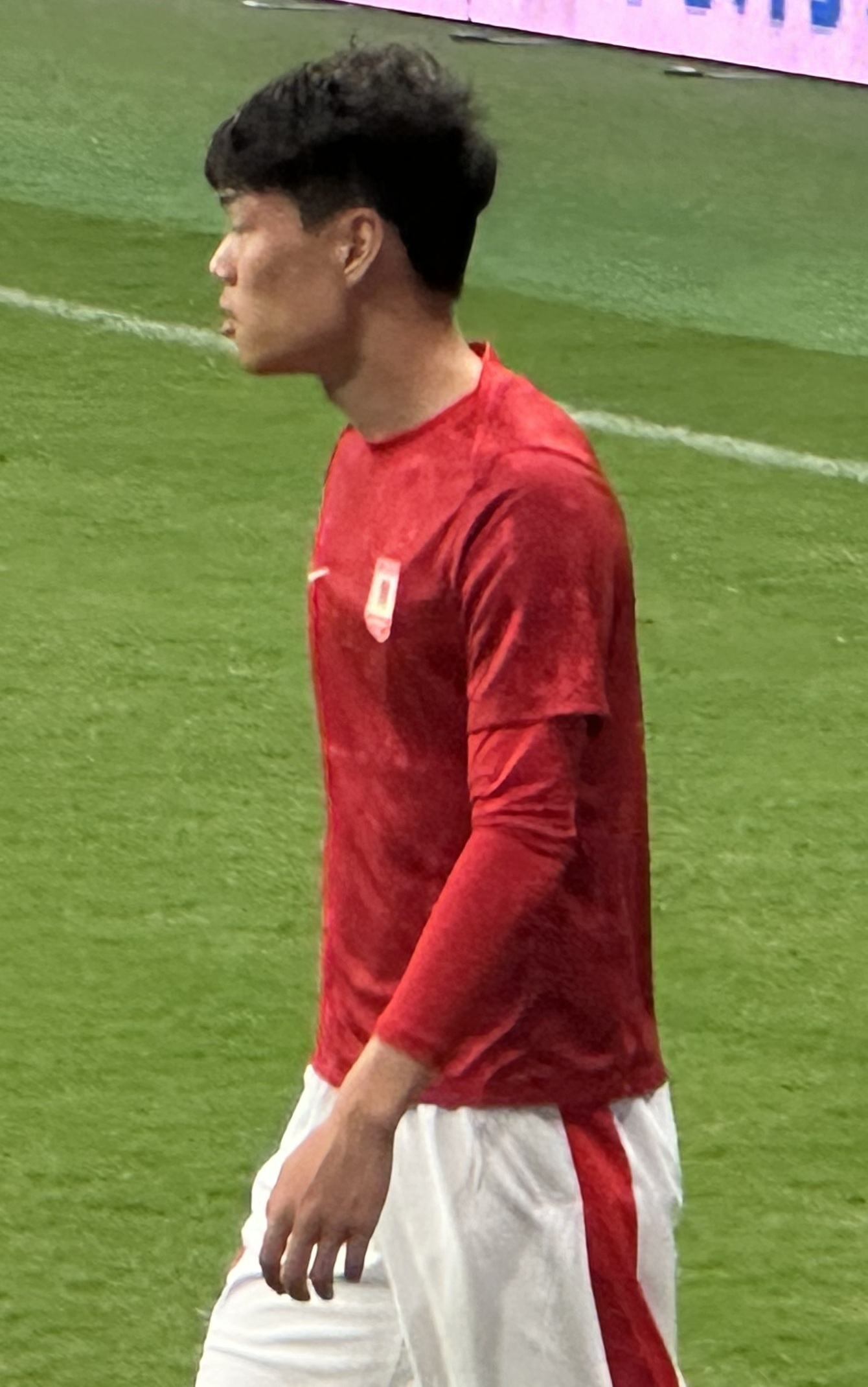
- He Yiran in June 2025

Personal information
- Date of birth: 17 February 2005 (age 21)
- Place of birth: Tianmen, Hubei, China
- Height: 1.84 m (6 ft 1/2 in)
- Position: Defender

Team information
- Current team: Chengdu Rongcheng
- Number: 4

Youth career
- Changchun Yatai

Senior career*
| Years | Team | Apps | (Gls) |
| 2022–2025 | Changchun Yatai | 51 | (0) |
| 2026– | Chengdu Rongcheng | 25 | (2) |

International career
| 2024–2025 | China U20 | 12 | (0) |
| 2025– | China U22 | 7 | (1) |
Medal record
Representing China
AFC U-23 Asian Cup
| Runner-up | 2026 Saudi Arabia | Team |
Asian Games
| Bronze medal – third place | 2026 Aichi–Nagoya | Team |
- * Club domestic league appearances and goals as of 31 August 2026

He Yiran (Chinese: 贺一然; pinyin: Hè Yīrán; born 17 February 2005) is a Chinese professional footballer who plays as a defender for Chinese Super League club Chengdu Rongcheng.

== Club career ==
He Yiran began his career playing for the youth academy of Changchun Yatai. He made his professional debut for the club as a substitute in a 7-1 away victory over Hebei FC in the Chinese Super League on 19 August 2022.

On 14 February 2026, He joined Chinese Super League club Chengdu Rongcheng.

== International career ==
He Yiran has played for China at various youth levels. He was part of the China U20's squad for the 2025 AFC U-20 Asian Cup, making four appearances in the tournament and reaching the Quarter-Finals, losing 1-0 to eventual finalists Saudi Arabia.

His strong performances for his country at Under-20 level earned him a call-up to the China Under-23 squad in March 2025, ahead of the Team China Cup.

He Yiran was also included and featured consistently for the team that reached the 2026 AFC Under-23 Asian Cup Final in Saudi Arabia.

== Career statistics ==
=== Club ===
As of 21 January 2026

| Club | Season | League | | | Cup | | Continental | | Other | | Total | |
| Club | Season | Division | Apps | Goals | Apps | Goals | Apps | Goals | Apps | Goals | Apps | Goals |
|---|---|---|---|---|---|---|---|---|---|---|---|---|
| Changchun Yatai | 2022 | Chinese Super League | 11 | 0 | 1 | 0 | – | | – | | 12 | 0 |
| Changchun Yatai | 2023 | Chinese Super League | 1 | 0 | 1 | 0 | – | | – | | 2 | 0 |
| Changchun Yatai | 2024 | Chinese Super League | 15 | 0 | 1 | 0 | – | | – | | 16 | 0 |
| Changchun Yatai | 2025 | Chinese Super League | 24 | 0 | 1 | 0 | – | | – | | 25 | 0 |
| Changchun Yatai | Total | | 51 | 0 | 4 | 0 | 0 | 0 | 0 | 0 | 55 | 0 |
| Career total | | | 51 | 0 | 4 | 0 | 0 | 0 | 0 | 0 | 55 | 0 |

== Honours ==
China U23

- AFC U-23 Asian Cup runner-up: 2026
