= Shanghai Port F.C. =

Chinese association football club

Shanghai Port 上海海港
- Full name: Shanghai Port Football Club 上海海港足球俱乐部
- Nickname: The Red Eagles (红鹰)
- Founded: 25 December 2005; 20 years ago
- Ground: Pudong Football Stadium
- Capacity: 37,000
- Owner: Shanghai International Port Group
- Chairman: Zhang Min
- Head coach: Kevin Muscat
- League: Chinese Super League
- 2026: Chinese Super League, 5th of 16
- Website: www.fcshanghaiport.com
Home colours	Away colours

Shanghai Port Football Club (Chinese: 上海海港足球俱乐部; pinyin: Shànghǎi Hǎigǎng Zúqiú Jùlèbù) is a Chinese professional football club based in Shanghai that competes in the Chinese Super League, the top tier of Chinese football. Shanghai Port plays its home matches at the Pudong Football Stadium, located within Pudong. Their owners are the Chinese group Shanghai International Port Group (SIPG).

The club was founded on 25 December 2005 as Shanghai East Asia (Chinese: 上海东亚; pinyin: Shànghǎi Dōngyà) by former Chinese international footballer Xu Genbao. The club used graduates from the Genbao Football Base, a football academy also founded by Xu, to form their first team as they made their debut in the third tier of China's football league pyramid in the 2006 league season. They made it to the top tier in the 2013 season and changed their name to Shanghai SIPG (Chinese: 上海上港; pinyin: Shànghǎi Shànggǎng) after SIPG's takeover in December 2014. They finished as league champions for the first time in the 2018 Chinese Super League season, and changed to their current name in 2021. Shanghai Port then won three more league titles in the 2023, 2024 and 2025 seasons.

According to a Forbes report from 2015, Shanghai Port was the third-most valuable football club in China, with a club value of $159 million and an estimated revenue of $37 million. According to the annual report of the parent company, the club had a revenue of CN¥565.7 million in 2015, as well as a net loss of CN¥41.5 million, total assets of CN¥286.8 million, and net assets of CN¥59.7 million.

== History ==
=== 2005–2007: League Two ===
On 16 May 2000, the former Chinese international football coach Xu Genbao founded the Genbao Football Base and enrolled 96 academy members born between 1988 and 1991, who were to be trained in the recently built Genbao Football Base Arena.

Xu Genbao initially had no intention of establishing a professional football club. However, as the youngsters in the Base grew up, the lack of youth football competition in China prompted Xu to set up a football club so that his protégés could earn match experiences in professional football. On 25 December 2005, Shanghai East Asia Football Club was jointly established by Xu Genbao and Shanghai East Asia Sports and Culture Center Co. Ltd, with Xu Genbao being the club chairman. Xu appointed Claude Lowitz, a French youth coach in the Base, as the team manager.

With young players aged between 14 and 17, Shanghai East Asia competed in the 2006 China League Two, the third-tier of the Chinese league system. The team played their home games at Genbao Football Base Arena training ground in Chongming, Shanghai, and eventually finished their first season in seventh place. During the campaign, Xu's players broke a few records during the season, with Cao Yunding being the youngest Chinese goalscorer aged 16 years and 242 days, and Wu Lei the youngest Chinese professional footballer, aged only 14 years and 287 days.

At the end of 2006, Claude Lowitz left the club, and former assistant manager Jiang Bingyao took up the manager position. With lessons learned and experiences gained from their debut season, the young East Asia FC went on to win the division title in 2007, by beating Sichuan in the final, and thus gaining promotion to China League One, the second-tier of the football league.

=== 2008–2012: League One ===
Despite the successful promotion, questions arose as to what would happen to the team, especially given that Xu's previous efforts to create a professional club (Shanghai 02) ended up being sold off to Shanghai Shenhua in 2002 due to financial difficulties. In June 2007, Shanghai government came to Xu's rescue with financial aid, in exchange East Asia FC would represent Shanghai in the 2009 National Games of China.

With the club in a higher division, Shanghai East Asia moved into the 30,000 seater Jinshan Sports Centre in Jinshan District of Shanghai and finished the 2008 China League One division campaign in sixth place. In summer 2009, Shanghai East Asia represented the Shanghai football team and took part in the 2009 National Games. Xu Genbao took up the management post himself and led the team to win gold in the men's football tournament. Meanwhile, in the league, Shanghai East Asia chose the 65,000 seater Shanghai Stadium as their home stadium for their 2009 China League One campaign. They finished the season in fourth place and just missed out on promotion by a single win, but it was still considered quite an achievement because that team was made up of players under 20 years old, and with no foreign imports.

The 2010 league season saw former Chinese international Fan Zhiyi receive his first management job at the club as well as the introduction of their first-ever foreign players in Macedonian Nikola Karçev and Haitian Fabrice Noël. Despite these new signings the club failed to improve upon the previous season's results and finished in fourth place. Failure to gain promotion and financial difficulties caused the club unable to hold onto their rising stars. Before the 2011 season, five of the team's starting players left the club: team captain Wang Jiayu, Chinese international Zhang Linpeng, and Chinese under-23 players Cao Yunding, Jiang Zhipeng, and Gu Chao. In the following 2011 season, Xu Genbao promoted several young players into the first team and the team finished the season in ninth place.

At the beginning of the 2012 season the club sold their team name to sponsor, Zobon Group for 30 million Yuan on a three-year deal, which saw the club change first team's name to Shanghai Tellace on 31 December 2011, while the club's name remains unchanged as Shanghai East Asia. At the end of the season, they won the league title and was promoted to the Chinese Super League.

=== 2013–present: Chinese Super League ===
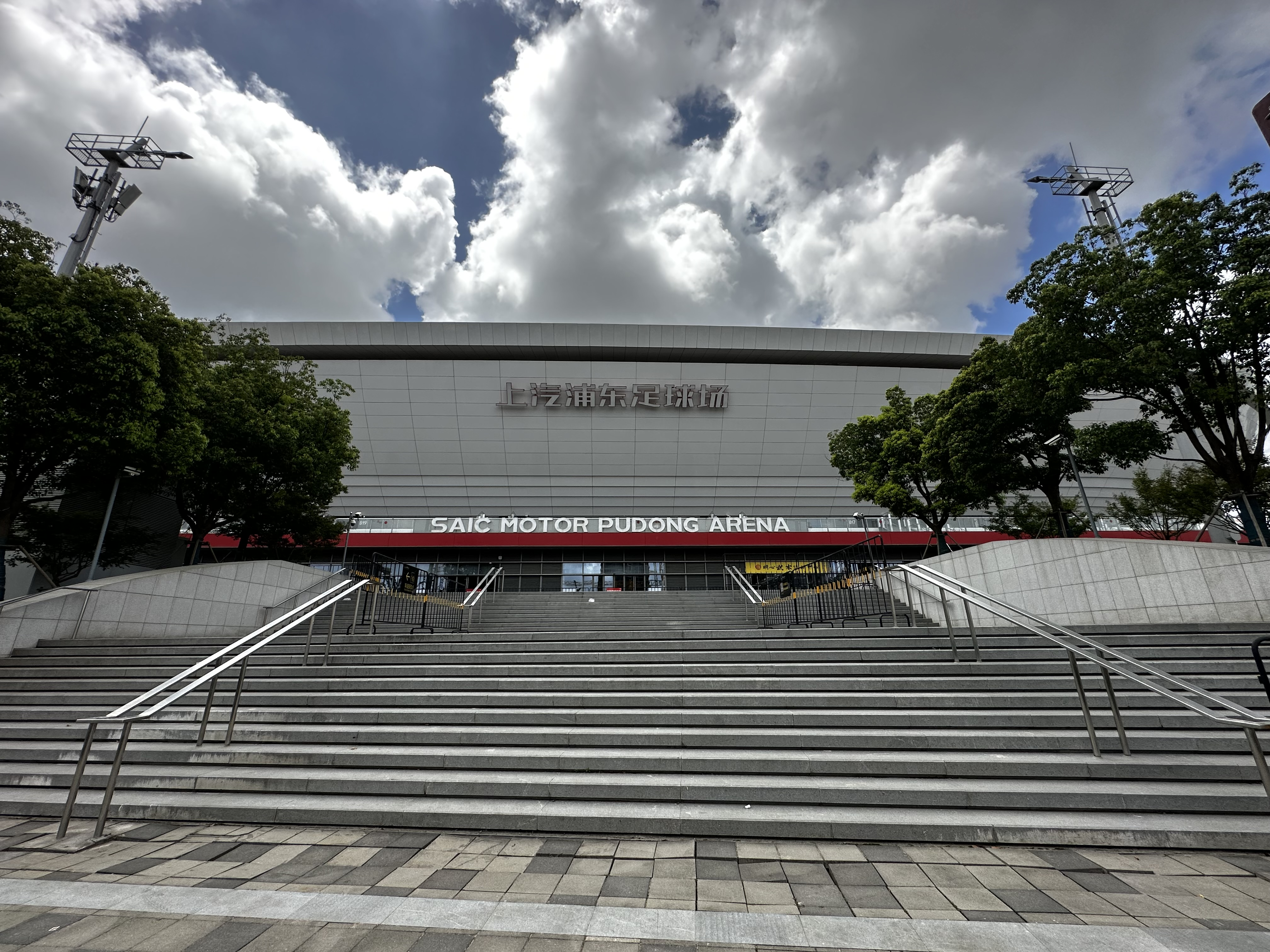
SAIC Motor Pudong Arena, the home ground of Shanghai Port since 2023

On 28 December 2012, Shanghai East Asia changed its first team name again to Port Shanghai F.C., under a 40-million Yuan sponsorship deal with Shanghai International Port. Within the off-season, on 7 January 2013, the club officially acquired another Shanghai-based football club, Shanghai Zobon, which had previously played in the 2012 China League Two division before they were dissolved. Most of its players, born between 1993 and 1994 and graduated from Genbao Football Base, were brought back under Xu Genbao's wing and would become the reserve team of Shanghai East Asia. In the club's debut within the top tier they brought in former Chinese national team manager Gao Hongbo as their head coach and he would go on to guide the club to a ninth-place finish at the end of the 2013 league season. The Shanghai International Port would decide to strengthen their position within the club and officially took over the whole club on 18 November 2014 and immediately appointed Sven-Göran Eriksson as their new head coach.

During the 2015 winter transfer window, Shanghai SIPG signed eight new players to strengthen the squad: Sun Xiang, Davi Rodrigues de Jesus, Dario Conca, Kim Ju-Young, Yang Boyu, Shi Ke, Jean Evrard Kouassi, and Yu Hai – who the club spent 50 million Yuan on. It became the highest transfer record of any Chinese player. The team won the first three games of the season, which creates their best CSL league start in its history. On 9 May, Shanghai SIPG secured a 5–0 victory over their rival Shanghai Greenland Shenhua, and it was their first victory in the Shanghai Derby. The team signed Ghanaian player Asamoah Gyan in the summer transfer window. Jean Evrard Kouassi was dropped into the reserve team due to the registration restriction at that time (4 foreign players + 1 Asian foreign player). Shanghai SIPG finished the season in second place with 65 points – just two points behind the champions Guangzhou Evergrande. It was their best league position in the club's history and they managed to get into the AFC Champions League qualification.

In the beginning of 2016, SAIC Motor Corporation became one of Shanghai SIPG's main sponsors. The club signed former AFC Champions League & CSL golden boot winner Elkeson from Guangzhou Evergrande for €18.5 million. It broke the record of the Chinese transfer market. On 9 February, the team secured a 3–0 victory over Muang Thong United from Thailand in the AFC Champions League qualification round, and successfully went in to the group stage of the ACL. Shanghai SIPG went through the group stage in first place. In the round of 16, Shanghai SIPG faced FC Tokyo. They lost 2–1 away in the first leg, yet thanks to Wu Lei's late 90th-minute goal in the second leg, the team went through the round of 16 with an away goal difference. During the summer transfer window, Shanghai SIPG spent €56 million to sign the Brazilian international Hulk. The team was eliminated in the ACL quarter-finals, and in the CSL, the team ended up in third place with 52 points.

In 2018, Shanghai rode the momentum of Wu Lei, who was the league's top scorer in that year, to win their first-ever CSL title. In 2019, they won the Super Cup for their second top tier trophy.

In 2026, Shanghai Port were deducted five points in the 2026 CSL season following an investigation by the Chinese Football Association into football corruption, gambling and match manipulation.

== Ownership and naming history ==
Logo of Shanghai SIPG F.C. (2015–2020)

Year	Owner	Club name	Sponsored team name
2005–2011	Genbao Football Base; Shanghai East Asia Sports and Culture Center Co. Ltd	Shanghai East Asia Football Club	
2012	Genbao Football Base; Shanghai East Asia Sports and Culture Center Co. Ltd	Shanghai East Asia Football Club	Shanghai Tellace (上海特莱士)
2013–2014	Genbao Football Base; Shanghai East Asia Sports and Culture Center Co. Ltd	Shanghai East Asia Football Club	Shanghai SIPG
2015–present	Shanghai International Port Group	Shanghai SIPG Football Club (2015–2020); Shanghai Port Football Club (2021–present)	

== Rivalries ==
The club's main rival is Shanghai Shenhua, with whom they contest the local Shanghai derby. With the club's founder Xu Genbao having managed Shenhua to the 1995 league title, the Shenhua tie holds a direct personal link between the two teams. On 28 April 2013 the two sides met for the first time in a league game that saw the club defeated 2–1 to Shenhua. The tie against Shanghai Shenxin also holds strong links between the two teams with Jiang Zhipeng and Wang Jiayu both having represented both teams before the two clubs met in their first derby on 2 June 2013, which resulted in a 6–1 victory. The club's geographical location has also opened them up to rivalries with neighbouring clubs Hangzhou Greentown and Jiangsu Guoxin-Sainty with whom they contest the Yangtze Delta Derby.

== Squad ==
=== First-team squad ===
As of 16 September 2026

Note: Flags indicate national team as defined under FIFA eligibility rules; some limited exceptions apply. Players may hold more than one non-FIFA nationality.

No.	Pos.	Nation	Player
1	GK	CHN	Yan Junling
3	DF	CHN	Jiang Guangtai
4	DF	CHN	Wang Shenchao
5	DF	CHN	Zhang Linpeng
6	MF	CHN	Zhang Yuan
7	FW	CHN	Wu Lei
8	MF	TOG	Kodjo Aziangbe (on loan from Yokohama F. Marinos)
10	MF	BRA	Mateus Vital
11	FW	BRA	Gabrielzinho
12	GK	CHN	Chen Wei
13	DF	CHN	Wei Zhen
14	FW	HKG	Matt Orr
16	MF	ESP	Jaume Grau (on loan from Tianjin Jinmen Tiger)
17	FW	GHA	Prince Ampem (on loan from Eyüpspor)
19	DF	CHN	Wang Zhen'ao
20	MF	CHN	Yang Shiyuan
21	MF	ESP	Óscar Melendo
22	DF	CHN	Alex Yang
23	DF	CHN	Fu Huan

No.	Pos.	Nation	Player
24	MF	CHN	Li Ruilong
26	MF	CHN	Liu Ruofan
28	DF	CHN	Yue Xin
31	DF	CHN	Bao Shimeng
32	DF	CHN	Li Shuai
33	FW	CHN	Liu Zhurun
35	FW	CHN	Wen Junxiang
37	FW	CHN	Zhang Junjie
38	MF	CHN	Lu Yongtao
40	DF	CHN	Umidjan Yusup
44	DF	POR	Miguel Campos
45	FW	BRA	Leonardo
46	FW	CHN	Cui Juncheng
47	MF	CHN	Kuai Jiwen
49	FW	CHN	Li Xinxiang
53	GK	CHN	Li Zhiliang
54	DF	CHN	Wang Dongcheng
55	GK	CHN	Zhang Yuhang
58	MF	CHN	Cao Zhezhe

=== B-team squad ===
As of July 2026

Note: Flags indicate national team as defined under FIFA eligibility rules; some limited exceptions apply. Players may hold more than one non-FIFA nationality.

No.	Pos.	Nation	Player
1	GK	CHN	Ren Zihao
2	DF	CHN	Zhang Wei (on loan from Qingdao Hainiu)
3	DF	CHN	Wang Zheng (on loan from Hubei Istar)
5	DF	CHN	Fan Weiyang
7	MF	CHN	Wang Yiwei
8	MF	CHN	Fan Yangyang
9	MF	CHN	Li Deming
10	FW	CHN	Zhang Huiyu
11	FW	CHN	Li Zesheng (on loan from Hubei Istar)
13	MF	CHN	Jiang Tianle
14	FW	CHN	Li Shenglong
16	MF	CHN	Li Jiaqi
18	FW	CHN	Han Yang
20	DF	CHN	Xie Hongyu
21	DF	CHN	Li Ming
23	MF	CHN	Li Yang
24	MF	CHN	Li Ruilong
27	MF	CHN	Ren Xiaohang
29	MF	CHN	Lu Weiyu

No.	Pos.	Nation	Player
30	DF	CHN	Xu Ruixuan
35	FW	CHN	Wen Junxiang
37	MF	CHN	Zhang Junjie
39	FW	CHN	Wang Wenzheng (on loan from Hubei Istar)
43	MF	CHN	Wang Zhaopu
44	MF	CHN	Yang Qiandong
46	MF	CHN	Cui Juncheng
48	MF	CHN	Li Junzhe
50	GK	CHN	Wang Qirong
51	DF	CHN	Liu Tiecheng
52	DF	CHN	Liu Wenqin
53	GK	CHN	Li Zhiliang
54	DF	CHN	Wang Dongcheng
55	GK	CHN	Zhang Yuhang
56	DF	CHN	Jiang Yufei
57	MF	CHN	Liang Jinhong
58	MF	CHN	Cao Zhezhe
59	DF	CHN	Wang Jinlei
60	FW	CHN	Wang Dan

=== Out on loan ===
Note: Flags indicate national team as defined under FIFA eligibility rules; some limited exceptions apply. Players may hold more than one non-FIFA nationality.

No.	Pos.	Nation	Player
—	FW	CHN	Afrden Asqer (at Qingdao West Coast until 31 December 2026)
—	FW	CHN	Feng Jin (at Dalian Yingbo until 31 December 2026)

No.	Pos.	Nation	Player
—	FW	CHN	Huang Yonghai (at Foshan Nanshi until 31 December 2026)

== Coaching staff ==
Position	Staff
Head coach	(Australia) Kevin Muscat
Assistant coaches	(Australia) Vincenzo Ierardo (Australia) Tony Vidmar
Goalkeeping coach	(England) Ian Walker
Head of physical performance	(Australia) Greg King
B-team head coach	(China) Cheng Yaodong
B-team assistant coach	(China) Yu Hai
B-team goalkeeping coach	(China) Guo Wenzhou
B-team goalkeeping coach	(China) Jia Chunhua
B-team fitness coach	(China) Mei Kai

Last updated: 1 May 2026

=== Managerial history ===
List of Shanghai Port managers:

- (France) Claude Lowitz (2006)
- (China) Jiang Bingyao (2007–2009)
- (China) Fan Zhiyi (2010)
- (China) Jiang Bingyao (January 2011 – 20 December 2012)
- (China) Gao Hongbo (27 February 2013 – 7 November 2013)
- (China) Xi Zhikang (4 December 2013 – 17 November 2014)
- (Sweden) Sven-Göran Eriksson (18 November 2014 – 4 November 2016)
- (Portugal) André Villas-Boas (4 November 2016 – 30 November 2017)
- (Portugal) Vítor Pereira (13 December 2017 – 31 December 2020)
- (Croatia) Ivan Leko (1 January 2021 – 1 December 2022)
- (China) Xi Zhikang (1 December 2022 – 28 February 2023)
- (Spain) Javier Pereira (1 March 2023 – 31 December 2023)
- (Australia) Kevin Muscat (1 January 2024 – present)

== Honours ==
=== League ===
- Chinese Super League
  - Winners (4): 2018, 2023, 2024, 2025
  - Runners-up (3): 2015, 2017, 2021
- China League One
  - Winners (1): 2012
- China League Two
  - Winners (1): 2007

=== Cup ===
- Chinese FA Cup
  - Winners (1): 2024
  - Runners-up (2): 2017, 2021
- Chinese FA Super Cup
  - Winners (1): 2019
  - Runners-up (3): 2024, 2025, 2026

== Results ==
=== Season-by-season rankings ===
Year	Div	Pld	W	D	L	GF	GA	GD	Pts.	Pos.	FA Cup	Super Cup	AFC	Stadium
2006	3	16	3	5	8	26	29	−3	14	7^{1}	DNE	NH	DNQ	Genbao Football Base
2007	3	17	11	4	2	35	15	+20	30^{1}	W	NH	NH	DNQ	Genbao Football Base
2008	2	24	7	7	10	26	30	−4	28	6	NH	NH	DNQ	Jinshan Football Stadium
2009	2	24	13	5	6	43	25	+18	44	4	NH	NH	DNQ	Shanghai Stadium
2010	2	24	9	10	5	25	18	+7	37	4	NH	NH	DNQ	Shanghai Stadium
2011	2	26	7	11	8	29	25	+4	32	9	R2	NH	DNQ	Shanghai Stadium
2012	2	30	17	8	5	47	25	+22	59	W	R3	DNQ	DNQ	Shanghai Stadium
2013	1	30	10	7	13	38	35	+3	37	9	R4	DNQ	DNQ	Shanghai Stadium
2014	1	30	12	12	6	47	39	+8	48	5	R3	DNQ	DNQ	Shanghai Stadium
2015	1	30	19	8	3	63	35	+28	65	RU	QF	DNQ	DNQ	Shanghai Stadium
2016	1	30	14	10	6	56	32	+24	52	3	R4	DNQ	Quarter-finals	Shanghai Stadium
2017	1	30	17	7	6	72	39	+33	58	RU	RU	DNQ	Semi-finals	Shanghai Stadium
2018	1	30	21	5	4	77	33	+44	68	W	QF	DNQ	Round of 16	Shanghai Stadium
2019	1	30	20	6	4	62	26	+36	66	3	SF	W	Quarter-finals	Shanghai Stadium
2020	1	14^{2}	10	2	2	26	11	+15	32	4^{3}	R2	NH	Round of 16	Yuanshen Sports Centre Stadium
2021	1	22	13	6	3	42	14	+28	45	RU	RU	NH	Play-off round	Centralised venues
2022	1	34	20	5	9	55	25	+30	65	4	SF	NH	Withdrew^{4}	Dalian Sports Centre Stadium
2023	1	30	19	6	5	61	30	+31	63	W	R4	DNQ	Play-off round	Pudong Football Stadium
2024	1	30	25	3	2	96	30	+66	78	W	W	RU	Round of 16	Pudong Football Stadium
2025	1	30	20	6	4	72	44	+28	66	W	R16	RU	League stage	Pudong Football Stadium
2026	1	30	14	8	8	56	37	+19	45^{5}	5		RU		Pudong Football Stadium

- ^1 In group stage
- ^2 The season was shortened due to the COVID-19 pandemic
- ^3 Lost in the semifinals
- ^4 Withdrew from the competition due to the COVID-19 lockdown measures
- ^5 Shanghai Port received a 5-point deduction

Key

	China top division
	China second division
	China third division
W	Winners
RU	Runners-up

- Div = Division
- Pld = Played
- W = Games won
- D = Games drawn
- L = Games lost
- GF = Goals for
- GA = Goals against
- GD = Goal difference
- Pts. = Points
- Pos. = Final position
- DNQ = Did not qualify
- DNE = Did not enter
- NH = Not held
- R2 = Second round
- R3 = Third round
- R4 = Fourth round
- QF = Quarter-finals
- SF = Semi-finals

=== International results ===
All results list Shanghai's goal tally first.

Season	Competition	Round	Opposition	Home	Away
2016	AFC Champions League	Play-off round	(Thailand) Muangthong United	3–0	
2016	AFC Champions League	Group stage	(Australia) Melbourne Victory	3–1	1–2
2016	AFC Champions League	Group stage	(South Korea) Suwon Samsung Bluewings	2–1	0–3
2016	AFC Champions League	Group stage	(Japan) Gamba Osaka	2–1	2–0
2016	AFC Champions League	Round of 16	(Japan) FC Tokyo	1–0 (a)	1–2
2016	AFC Champions League	Quarter–finals	(South Korea) Jeonbuk Hyundai Motors	0–0	0–5
2017	AFC Champions League	Play-off round	(Thailand) Sukhothai	3–0	
2017	AFC Champions League	Group stage	(South Korea) FC Seoul	4–2	1–0
2017	AFC Champions League	Group stage	(Australia) Western Sydney Wanderers	5–1	2–3
2017	AFC Champions League	Group stage	(Japan) Urawa Red Diamonds	3–2	0–1
2017	AFC Champions League	Round of 16	(China) Jiangsu Suning	2–1	3–2
2017	AFC Champions League	Quarter–finals	(China) Guangzhou Evergrande	4–0	1–5 (a.e.t.) (5–4 p)
2017	AFC Champions League	Semi-finals	(Japan) Urawa Red Diamonds	1–1	0–1
2018	AFC Champions League	Play-off round	(Thailand) Chiangrai United	1–0	
2018	AFC Champions League	Group stage	(Australia) Melbourne Victory	4–1	1–2
2018	AFC Champions League	Group stage	(Japan) Kawasaki Frontale	1–1	1–0
2018	AFC Champions League	Group stage	(South Korea) Ulsan Hyundai	2–2	1–0
2018	AFC Champions League	Round of 16	(Japan) Kashima Antlers	2–1	1–3
2019	AFC Champions League	Group stage	(Japan) Kawasaki Frontale	1–0	2–2
2019	AFC Champions League	Group stage	(South Korea) Ulsan Hyundai	5–0	0–1
2019	AFC Champions League	Group stage	(Australia) Sydney FC	2–2	3–3
2019	AFC Champions League	Round of 16	(South Korea) Jeonbuk Hyundai Motors	1–1	1–1 (a.e.t.) (5–3 p)
2019	AFC Champions League	Quarter–finals	(Japan) Urawa Red Diamonds	2–2	1–1 (a)
2020	AFC Champions League	Play-off round	(Thailand) Buriram United	3–0	
2020	AFC Champions League	Group stage	(Australia) Sydney FC	0–4	2–1
2020	AFC Champions League	Group stage	(South Korea) Jeonbuk Hyundai Motors	0–2	2–1
2020	AFC Champions League	Group stage	(Japan) Yokohama F. Marinos	0–1	2–1
2020	AFC Champions League	Round of 16	(Japan) Vissel Kobe	0–2	
2021	AFC Champions League	Play-off round	(Philippines) Kaya–Iloilo	0–1	
2023–24	AFC Champions League	Play-off round	(Thailand) BG Pathum United	2–3	
2024–25	AFC Champions League Elite	League stage	(Malaysia) Johor Darul Ta'zim	2–2	—N/a
2024–25	AFC Champions League Elite	League stage	(South Korea) Pohang Steelers	—N/a	0–3
2024–25	AFC Champions League Elite	League stage	(Australia) Central Coast Mariners	3–2	—N/a
2024–25	AFC Champions League Elite	League stage	(Japan) Kawasaki Frontale	—N/a	1–3
2024–25	AFC Champions League Elite	League stage	(South Korea) Ulsan HD	—N/a	3–1
2024–25	AFC Champions League Elite	League stage	(South Korea) Gwangju FC	1–1	—N/a
2024–25	AFC Champions League Elite	League stage	(Japan) Vissel Kobe	—N/a	0–4
2024–25	AFC Champions League Elite	League stage	(Japan) Yokohama F. Marinos	0–2	—N/a
2024–25	AFC Champions League Elite	Round of 16	(Japan) Yokohama F. Marinos	0–1	1–4
2025–26	AFC Champions League Elite	League stage	(Japan) Vissel Kobe	0–3	—N/a
2025–26	AFC Champions League Elite	League stage	(Japan) Sanfrecce Hiroshima	—N/a	1–1
2025–26	AFC Champions League Elite	League stage	(Japan) Machida Zelvia	0–2	—N/a
2025–26	AFC Champions League Elite	League stage	(Thailand) Buriram United	—N/a	0–2
2025–26	AFC Champions League Elite	League stage	(South Korea) FC Seoul	1–3	—N/a
2025–26	AFC Champions League Elite	League stage	(Malaysia) Johor Darul Ta'zim	—N/a	0–0
2025–26	AFC Champions League Elite	League stage	(South Korea) Gangwon FC	—N/a	0–0
2025–26	AFC Champions League Elite	League stage	(South Korea) Ulsan HD	0–0	—N/a
2026–27	AFC Champions League Elite	League stage	(Thailand) Ratchaburi	—N/a	6–4
2026–27	AFC Champions League Elite	League stage	(South Korea) Daejeon Hana Citizen	1–1	—N/a
2026–27	AFC Champions League Elite	League stage	(Vietnam) Công An Hà Nội	2–3	—N/a
2026–27	AFC Champions League Elite	League stage	(Australia) Newcastle Jets	—N/a	4–2
2026–27	AFC Champions League Elite	League stage	(Thailand) Buriram United		—N/a
2026–27	AFC Champions League Elite	League stage	(South Korea) Pohang Steelers	—N/a	
2026–27	AFC Champions League Elite	League stage	(Thailand) Port		—N/a
2026–27	AFC Champions League Elite	League stage	(South Korea) Jeonbuk Hyundai Motors	—N/a	
