= Yancheng Olympic Sports Center Stadium =

Sports venue in Jiangsu, China

- 盐城奥体中心体育场
- Location: 287 Jiefang South Road, Yancheng, Jiangsu, China
- Owner: Yancheng Municipal Government
- Capacity: 36,000
- Surface: Grass

Construction
- Groundbreaking: 2011
- Opened: April 2016

Tenant
- Yancheng football team (Jiangsu Super League)

The Yancheng Olympic Sports Center Stadium (Chinese: 盐城奥体中心体育场) is a multi-purpose stadium located in Yancheng, Jiangsu Province, China. It is the main venue of the Yancheng Olympic Sports Center complex and serves as the home ground for the Yancheng football team in the Jiangsu Football City League.

== History and construction ==
The stadium was originally part of the Yancheng South Sports Center (城南体育中心) project. Construction of the complex began in 2011 through a BT (build-transfer) investment model, with a total project investment of approximately 2.4 billion yuan. The stadium was delivered and put into operation in April 2016.

In July 2023, the "Yancheng South Sports Center" was officially renamed to Yancheng Olympic Sports Center (盐城市奥林匹克体育中心), with the stadium becoming known as the Yancheng Olympic Sports Center Stadium.

== Design and facilities ==
The stadium has a total construction area of 55,000 square meters and a seating capacity of 36,000 spectators. The exterior features a curved roof with red accents, evoking the red-crowned crane, a bird associated with Yancheng's wetland environment. The main structure comprises four above-ground floors with a partial underground level.

In 2019, the stadium underwent an upgrade to its signage and wayfinding system, with Panasign winning the bid to provide integrated design and construction services for the stadium's identification, LED displays, and lighting systems.

== Events ==
=== Sports events ===
Since its opening, the stadium has hosted multiple editions of the Yancheng Marathon, serving as both the start and finish point for the race. The 2026 Yancheng Marathon, held on 29 March 2026, was certified as a World Athletics Label Road Race and attracted 42,145 applicants from 21 countries and regions, with 15,000 runners participating.

The stadium also hosted athletics competitions during the 8th Yancheng City Games in 2016.

In 2025, the stadium became one of the home venues for the Jiangsu Football City League, an amateur football competition across Jiangsu Province. On 3 August 2025, the stadium recorded an attendance of 34,209 spectators for the match between Yancheng and Changzhou. The stadium continued to host Yancheng team home matches during the 2026 season.

=== Concerts and entertainment ===
The stadium has been used as a concert venue since its opening. In 2016, it hosted concerts by Jacky Cheung and Yang Kun, drawing approximately 30,000 attendees. Additional concerts by artists including Jeff Chang, Angela Chang, and others have been held at the venue in subsequent years.

== Complex and surrounding facilities ==
The stadium is part of the larger Yancheng Olympic Sports Center complex, which covers 513 mu (approximately 34.2 hectares) with a total building area of 194,000 square meters. The complex includes three additional venues: a comprehensive gymnasium (26,000 square meters, 8,000 seats), a natatorium (43,000 square meters, 2,000 seats), and an art museum (66,000 square meters, 1,225 seats), plus a children's sports park. The natatorium opened in 2023 after interior renovations.

== Transportation ==
The stadium is located at 287 Jiefang South Road in the Yannan High-tech Zone (盐南高新区). The complex is bounded by Jiefang South Road to the east, Xiaqiao Road to the west, Lanhai Road to the south, and Haiyang Road to the north. Public transit access includes multiple bus routes serving the surrounding area, with dedicated shuttle services provided during major events such as the Yancheng Marathon.

== See also ==
- List of football stadiums in China
- Jiangsu Super League
