= Wen Junxiang =

Chinese footballer (born 2007)

Personal information
- Full name: 温钧翔
- Date of birth: 9 September 2007 (age 19)
- Place of birth: Guigang, Guangxi, China
- Height: 1.85 m (6 ft 1 in)
- Position: Forward

Team information
- Current team: Shanghai Port
- Number: 35

Youth career
- 2020–2024: Shanghai Port

Senior career*
Years	Team	Apps	(Gls)
2025–	Shanghai Port B	45	(14)
2026–	Shanghai Port	0	(0)

International career^{‡}
2024	China U17		
2026–	China U19		
- * Club domestic league appearances and goals as of 22 September 2026 ‡ National team caps and goals as of 22 September 2026

Wen Junxiang (simplified Chinese: 温钧翔; traditional Chinese: 溫鈞翔; pinyin: Wēn Jūnxiáng; born 9 September 2007) is a Chinese professional footballer who plays as a forward for Chinese Super League club Shanghai Port.

== Early life ==
Wen was born in 2007 in Guigang, Guangxi. He first played football through a school football program, practicing after class on a sand pitch, and his parents took him to trials in Nanning and Guangzhou. At the age of 11 he passed a selection trial to join the Shanghai Port academy, becoming the only Guangxi-born player of his age group at the club. He entered the club's 2007 age-group academy side in 2020.

== Club career ==
=== Shanghai Port youth ===
In August 2023, representing the club's U15 side at the national finals of the Chinese Youth Football League, Wen scored twice in a 3–1 placement-match win over Suzhou Dongwu U15, and the team beat Liaoning Shenyang City 73rd Middle School 1–0 in the ninth-place play-off. Later that year, playing for the club's U17 side at the Chinese Youth Football League U17 national finals in Duyun, he equalised from a free kick in the 24th minute and scored a second goal in the 62nd minute of a 2–2 draw with Hubei Xinghui, and scored direct free kicks in two consecutive rounds of the competition. In 2023 he recorded three goals and assists in a single U16 league match, and Chinese media nicknamed him "Little Wu Lei".

On 29 June 2024, the Chinese Football Association announced that Wen had been named the best player of round five of the first final stage of the 2024 CFA Youth Football Championship (professional club U17 group), after he played 92 minutes and scored twice against Guangzhou FC to help Shanghai Port win. On 21 October 2024, he was named the best player of round three of the second final stage of the same competition, having played the full match and scored twice in a 3–0 win over Shenzhen Peng City. Shanghai Port won the tournament, and Wen was selected in the competition's best XI as a forward. He scored twice in the final, played in heavy rain, and was named the tournament's MVP, weeping with gratitude to his first coach in a post-match interview. He represented Shanghai at the National Three Major Ball Games.

=== Shanghai Port B ===
On 22 March 2025, Wen made his China League Two debut for Shanghai Port's B team, which competed under the name Shanghai Port Fusheng Jingkai, in the club's season opener against Taian Tiankuang. He came off the bench and scored as the team won 2–1, and at 17 years and six months he became the youngest goalscorer in the B team's history.

On 22 March 2026, in the opening round of the 2026 China League Two season, Wen scored in the 4th minute from a rebound and added a long-range goal in the 20th minute to complete a brace in a 6–1 away win over Shanghai Second, and he was named the best player of the round. On 4 July 2026, the league announced Wen as the best young player of March–April 2026, during which he made six appearances, scoring two goals and providing two assists; by then he had recorded four goals and two assists in 14 appearances for the club in the season. His first-round brace, including a long-range strike, had already earned him that round's MVP award. In an interview published by Dongqiudi on 30 March 2026, Wen said that he hoped to win the League Two title with the team and earn promotion to the first team as soon as possible, naming first-team striker Li Shenglong as his role model.

On 4 July 2026, Wen scored twice—opening the scoring in the 10th minute and converting a penalty he had won in the 71st minute—in a 5–1 home win over Beijing Institute of Technology. After the first 23 rounds of the 2026 season he had scored nine goals, ranking third on the league's scoring chart.

On 14 September 2026, Shanghai Port officially published its squad list for the 2026–27 AFC Champions League Elite, which included Wen as the team's number 35 forward. As of September 2026, he had not yet made a Chinese Super League appearance.

== International career ==
In 2024, Wen was called up to the China U17 national team for the first time.

On 18 September 2026, the Chinese Football Association published a 29-man training camp squad for the China U19 national team, which included Wen. Head coach Dejan Đurđević retained only 13 players from the squad that had competed at the 2026 Toulon Tournament, with the newly called-up players all holding regular playing records in China's professional leagues; Wen's nine goals in the first 23 rounds of China League Two ranked third on the scoring chart. The camp ran from 20 September to 5 October at the National Football Training Base in Xianghe.

== Career statistics ==
=== Club ===
As of 22 September 2026

Appearances and goals by club, season and competition
Club	Season	League			National Cup		Continental		Other		Total	
Club	Season	Division	Apps	Goals	Apps	Goals	Apps	Goals	Apps	Goals	Apps	Goals
Shanghai Port B	2025	China League Two	21	5	0	0	—		—		21	5
Shanghai Port B	2026	China League Two	24	9	0	0	—		—		24	9
Career total			45	14	0	0	0	0	0	0	45	14

== Honours ==
Shanghai Port U17

- Chinese Football Association Youth Football Championship (professional club U17 group): 2024

Individual

- Chinese Football Association Youth Football Championship (professional club U17 group) final first-stage round 5 best player: 2024
- Chinese Football Association Youth Football Championship (professional club U17 group) final second-stage round 3 best player: 2024
- China League Two March–April best young player: 2026
