= Xie Hongyu =

Chinese footballer (born 2002)

Personal information
- Date of birth: 16 April 2002 (age 24)
- Place of birth: Changsha, Hunan, China
- Height: 1.85 m (6 ft 1 in)
- Position: Defender

Team information
- Current team: Shanghai Port B
- Number: 20

Youth career
- 2011–2022: Zhejiang Greentown

Senior career*
Years	Team	Apps	(Gls)
2022	Hangzhou Qiantang		
2023–2024	Quanzhou Yassin	21	(4)
2025	Lanzhou Longyuan Athletic	24	(3)
2026–	Shanghai Port B	19	(1)
- * Club domestic league appearances and goals as of 5 August 2026

Xie Hongyu (simplified Chinese: 谢鸿宇; traditional Chinese: 謝鴻宇; pinyin: Xiè Hóngyǔ; born 16 April 2002) is a Chinese professional footballer who plays as a defender for China League Two club Shanghai Port B.

== Early life and youth career ==
Xie was born on 16 April 2002 in Changsha, Hunan. He began playing football at the age of six at Xinwen School in Liuyang, Hunan. In 2011, he entered Zhejiang Greentown Football School. In September 2021, he represented Zhejiang Province in the 14th National Games football competition (men's under-20 category), winning a gold medal.

== Club career ==
=== Hangzhou Qiantang ===
In 2022, Xie represented Hangzhou Qiantang in the Chinese Champions League.

=== Quanzhou Yassin ===
In 2023, Xie joined Quanzhou Yassin. On 14 July 2024, during the 16th round of the 2024 China League Two preliminary stage, he scored a goal in a 2–3 away loss to Shanghai Port B. On 20 July 2024, during the 17th round, he scored a long-range goal in a 1–0 home victory over Ganzhou Ruishi. On 12 October 2024, during the 27th round of the final stage, he scored in the final moments to secure a 2–1 victory over Hubei Istar.

=== Lanzhou Longyuan Athletic ===
In 2025, Xie transferred to Lanzhou Longyuan Athletic. On 9 April 2025, during the 4th round of the 2025 China League Two preliminary stage, he scored a goal in a 2–0 home victory over Hubei Istar. On 31 May 2025, during the 12th round, he scored a rebound goal in a 3–1 away victory over Hangzhou Linping Wuyue. On 15 June 2025, during the 14th round, he scored a header in a 2–2 away draw against Shandong Taishan B.

=== Shanghai Port B ===
In 2026, Xie transferred to Shanghai Port B. He was assigned the squad number 20. On 15 April 2026, during the 4th round of the 2026 China League Two preliminary stage, he scored a goal in a 2–0 away victory over Beijing Institute of Technology. On 18 July 2026, during the 17th round, he started in a 2–0 away victory over Changchun Xidu. On 5 August 2026, he was named captain in a 0–1 home loss to Shanxi Chongde Ronghai in a rescheduled match of the 16th round.

== Career statistics ==
=== Club ===
As of 5 August 2026

Appearances and goals by club, season and competition
Club	Season	League			National Cup		Continental		Other		Total	
Club	Season	Division	Apps	Goals	Apps	Goals	Apps	Goals	Apps	Goals	Apps	Goals
Quanzhou Yassin	2024	China League Two	21	4	—		—		—		21	4
Lanzhou Longyuan Athletic	2025	China League Two	24	3	—		—		—		24	3
Shanghai Port B	2026	China League Two	19	1	—		—		—		19	1
Career total			64	8	0	0	0	0	0	0	64	8

== Honours ==
Zhejiang Province

- National Games (men's U20): 2021
