= 2025 CFA Team China Cup =

2025 CFA Team China
2025CFA中国之队·盐城国际足球邀请赛

Tournament details
- Host country: China
- City: Yancheng
- Dates: 20–25 March
- Teams: 4 (from 1 confederation)
- Venue: 1

Final positions
- Champions: China (2nd title)
- Runners-up: South Korea
- Third place: Vietnam
- Fourth place: Uzbekistan

Tournament statistics
- Matches played: 6
- Goals scored: 9 (1.5 per match)
- Top scorer(s): 9 players (1 goal each)

The 2025 CFA Team China was the second edition of the under-23 CFA Cup organised by Chinese Football Association (CFA), an invitational under-22 football tournament held in Yancheng, China from 20 to 25 March 2025.

== Format ==
The four invited teams played a round-robin tournament. Points awarded in the group stage followed the formula of three points for a win, one point for a draw, and zero points for a loss. A tie in points was decided by goal differential.

== Venue ==
Yancheng
Yancheng Olympic Sports Center Stadium
Capacity: 37,003

== Teams ==
- China (hosts)
- Vietnam
- Uzbekistan
- South Korea

== Standings ==
Pos	Team	Pld	W	D	L	GF	GA	GD	Pts	
1	China (H, C)	3	1	2	0	2	1	+1	5	Champions
2	South Korea	3	1	1	1	4	3	+1	4	Runners-up
3	Vietnam	3	0	3	0	2	2	0	3	Third place
4	Uzbekistan	3	0	2	1	1	3	−2	2	Fourth place

Rules for classification: 1) points; 2) goal difference; 3) goals scored; 4) head-to-head points; 5) head-to-head goal difference; 6) head-to-head number of goals scored; 7) Disciplinary points (yellow card = 1 point, red card as a result of two yellow cards = 3 points, direct red card = 3 points, yellow card followed by direct red card = 4 points).
(C) Champions; (H) Hosts

== Results ==
All match times are in local time, (UTC+8).

20 March 2025
15:30

South Korea	1–1	Vietnam
Kim Woo-bin 90+5'	Report	Nguyễn Thanh Nhàn 53'

Yancheng Olympic Sports Center Stadium, Yancheng
20 March 2025
19:35

China	0–0	Uzbekistan
	Report

Yancheng Olympic Sports Center Stadium, Yancheng
Attendance: 6,198
Referee: Du Jianxin (China)

23 March 2025
15:30

China	1–0	South Korea
Liu Haofan 86'	Report

Yancheng Olympic Sports Center Stadium, Yancheng
Attendance: 18,985
Referee: Ai Kun (China)
23 March 2025
19:35

Vietnam	0–0	Uzbekistan
	Report

Yancheng Olympic Sports Center Stadium, Yancheng

25 March 2025
15:30

Uzbekistan	1–3	South Korea
Turdimurodov 90+3'	Report	Hwang In-taek 27'; Lee Seung-won 73'; Moon Min-seo 90+6'

Yancheng Olympic Sports Center Stadium, Yancheng
25 March 2025
19:35

China	1–1	Vietnam
Afrden 71' (pen.)	Report	Nguyễn Quốc Việt 31'

Yancheng Olympic Sports Center Stadium, Yancheng
Attendance: 8,628
Referee: Dai Yige (China)

== Goalscorers ==
There were 9 goals scored in 6 matches, for an average of 1.5 goals per match.

1 goal

- (Vietnam) Nguyễn Thanh Nhàn
- (South Korea) Kim Woo-bin
- (China) Liu Haofan
- (Uzbekistan) Rustam Turdimurodov
- (South Korea) Hwang In-taek
- (South Korea) Lee Seung-won
- (South Korea) Moon Min-seo
- (Vietnam) Nguyễn Quốc Việt
- (China) Afrden Asqer
