= Shandong Qilu Football Super League =

- Founded: 2015; 11 years ago
- Country: China
- Province: Shandong
- Number of clubs: 16 (2026 season)
- Current champions: Tai'an Taishan Chengjian (2025)

The Shandong Qilu Football Super League (simplified Chinese: 山东省齐鲁足球超级联赛; traditional Chinese: 山東省齊魯足球超級聯賽; pinyin: Shāndōng Shěng Qílǔ Zúqiú Chāojí Liánsài), commonly known as the Qilu Chao or Lu Chao (Chinese: 齐鲁超赛), is a provincial amateur football league in Shandong, China. Organized by the Shandong Football Association, the league is the highest-level amateur football competition in the province.

== History ==
The league was founded in 2015.

In 2025, the league underwent a major format reform, introducing the "Three Leagues Integration" system that linked the Qilu Super League with the Qingdao City Super League and the Shandong University Super League.

== 2025 season ==
The 2025 season kicked off on 13 September 2025 at the Zibo Sports Center Stadium, with Zibo Qiji United defeating Jinan United 2–0 in the opening match, attracting over 25,000 spectators.

The season featured 18 teams divided into four regional divisions: Northwest Shandong (Lu Xi), Central Shandong (Lu Zhong), Southwest Shandong (Lu Xi'nan), and East Shandong (Lu Dong). The competition used a home-and-away format with matches held on weekends and holidays.

The final was held on 23 November 2025 at the Tai'an Sports Center Stadium, where Tai'an Taishan Chengjian defeated Liaocheng Legend 2–1 on aggregate (0–0 first leg, 2–1 second leg) to win the championship, attracting 22,936 spectators.

== Format ==
Players come from all walks of life, including enterprise employees, college students, and high school students.

== Teams ==
=== 2025 season ===
2025 Shandong Qilu Football Super League teams
Team	City	Division
Zibo Qiji United	Zibo	Central Shandong
Jinan United	Jinan	Central Shandong
Tai'an Taishan Chengjian	Tai'an	Central Shandong
Linyi Hongjian	Linyi	Central Shandong
Liaocheng Legend	Liaocheng	Northwest Shandong
Binzhou	Binzhou	Northwest Shandong
Dongying	Dongying	Northwest Shandong
Dezhou	Dezhou	Northwest Shandong
Jining	Jining	Southwest Shandong
Zaozhuang	Zaozhuang	Southwest Shandong
Heze Linggan	Heze	Southwest Shandong
Linyi Ball Scouts	Linyi	Southwest Shandong
Weihai Weichao	Weihai	East Shandong
Rizhao	Rizhao	East Shandong
Weifang	Weifang	East Shandong
Jinan Quansheng United	Jinan	East Shandong
Yantai Bank	Yantai	East Shandong

== Seasons ==
Shandong Qilu Football Super League seasons
Season	Champions	Runners-up	Opening match host
2025	Tai'an Taishan Chengjian	Liaocheng Legend	Zibo

== See also ==
- Jiangsu Football City League
- Sichuan City Football League
- Hubei City Football League
- Shandong Football Association
