= Xi Zhikang =

Chinese footballer

Xi Zhikang 奚志康
Personal information
- Full name: Xi Zhikang
- Date of birth: 15 November 1956 (age 69)
- Place of birth: Shanghai, China
- Position: Forward

Senior career*
Years	Team	Apps	(Gls)
- Shanghai

International career
- China

Managerial career
- 1995–1996: Shanghai Dashun
- 1998: Shanghai HSBC
- 2000: Shanghai Pudong
- 2011: Shanghai Shenhua
- 2013–2014: Shanghai SIPG
- 2022–2023: Shanghai Port
- * Club domestic league appearances and goals

Xi Zhikang (Chinese: 奚志康; pinyin: Xī Zhìkāng; born 15 November 1956) is a former Chinese footballer. He last managed Shanghai Port.

== Playing career ==
Born in Shanghai, Xi played for the Shanghai team. During Su Yongshun's management of the Chinese national team, Xi received a call-up.

== Managerial career ==
In 1994, following his retirement, Xi entered coaching. Xi's first coaching role was under Hu Zhigang's management of newly formed Shenzhen. Despite winning the Yi League, Xi moved on in 1995 to manage Shanghai Dashun. In 1998, Xi returned to manage the club, now known as Shanghai HSBC. In 2001, after a stint managing Shanghai Pudong, Zhikang joined the coaching staff at Shanghai Shenhua. In December 2011, Xi was announced as Shanghai Shenhua's manager. In 2013, Xi joined the coaching staff at rivals Shanghai SIPG. In December 2013, Xi was appointed manager of Shanghai SIPG for the upcoming 2014 Chinese Super League season.

== Personal life ==
Xi is a member of the Chinese Communist Party.
