= Bruno Casanova (footballer) =

Argentine footballer

Personal information
- Full name: Bruno Óscar Casanova
- Date of birth: 10 August 1984 (age 42)
- Place of birth: Santa Fé, Santa Fe, Argentina
- Height: 1.69 m (5 ft 6 1/2 in)
- Position: Midfielder

Youth career
- Colón

Senior career*
Years	Team	Apps	(Gls)
2005–2009	Unión Santa Fe		
2009–2010	Ironi Bat Yam		
2010–2011	Deportivo Cuenca	11	(0)
2011	Chengdu Blades		
2011–2012	Ferro Carril Oeste	20	(1)
2012–2013	Jorge Wilstermann		
2013–2014	Unión La Calera	4	(0)
2014-XXXX	Temperley	5	(0)
- * Club domestic league appearances and goals as of 29 March 2015

Bruno Óscar Casanova (born 10 August 1984) is an Argentine football midfielder.

== Club career ==
=== Chengdu Blades ===
Casanova transferred to Chinese club Chengdu Blades in March 2011.
