= Sichuan City Football League =

- Founded: 2025; 1 year ago
- Country: China
- Province: Sichuan
- Number of clubs: 21
- Current: 2025–26

The Sichuan City Football League (simplified Chinese: 四川省城市足球联赛; traditional Chinese: 四川省城市足球聯賽; pinyin: Sìchuān Shěng Chéngshì Zúqiú Liánsài), commonly known as the Chuan Super or Chuan Chao (Chinese: 川超), is a provincial amateur football league in Sichuan, China. Organized by the Sichuan Provincial Sports Bureau and the Sichuan Football Association, the league features teams representing the province's 21 prefecture-level cities and autonomous prefectures.

== History ==
The league was established in 2025, inspired by the success of the Jiangsu Football City League (Su Chao). In June 2025, netizens proposed the creation of a Sichuan equivalent through the "Wenzheng Sichuan" platform, prompting the Sichuan Provincial Sports Bureau to begin preparations. On 8 August 2025, the Sichuan Provincial Sports Bureau issued the competition regulations to all cities and prefectures, officially opening team registration.

On 5 September 2025, a pre-season press conference was held in Chengdu, where the league logo, mascot, trophies, and promotional song were unveiled. The league was officially named the "Sichuan Bank 2025/2026 Sichuan City Football League" with Sichuan Bank as the title sponsor.

=== 2025/2026 season ===
The inaugural season kicked off on 20 September 2025 at the Chengdu Shuangliu Sports Center. The opening match featured Chengdu Jincheng defeating Suining Shedegan 6–0, attracting 21,448 spectators.

The preliminary stage ran from September to December 2025, with 21 teams divided into four regional divisions (East, West, South, North) playing a home-and-away double round-robin format over 10 rounds and 90 matches.

The final stage began on 13 March 2026 at the Dazhou Sports Center, with nine teams qualifying: the top three from the East Division and the top two from each of the other three divisions. The opening match of the final stage saw Dazhou Chuanhanzi draw 1–1 with Liangshan Haoyisheng. The final stage consists of 18 rounds and 72 matches, concluding in June 2026, followed by the remaining 20 teams form a combined squad to face the champion.

== Format ==
The league follows a "one city, one team" principle, with each prefecture-level city or autonomous prefecture fielding a single representative team. Teams are named using a "city + local cultural/tourism feature" format.

Players must be between 18 and 45 years old. Active professional players registered with the Chinese Football Association are prohibited from participating, ensuring the league's amateur status.

== Teams ==
2025/26 Sichuan City Football League teams
Team	City/Prefecture	Division
Chengdu Jincheng	Chengdu	East
Suining Shedegan	Suining	East
Nanchong Sichou Yuandian	Nanchong	East
Dazhou Chuanhanzi	Dazhou	East
Guang'an Banman	Guang'an	East
Bazhong Hongye	Bazhong	East
Ya'an Xiongmao	Ya'an	West
Meishan Shetianlang	Meishan	West
Leshan Weidao Feichang	Leshan	West
Panzhihua Pangang Gangtie Yongshi	Panzhihua	West
Liangshan Haoyisheng	Liangshan	West
Zigong Dengcheng Shenlong	Zigong	South
Luzhou Jiaoxiang	Luzhou	South
Yibin Changjiang Shoucheng	Yibin	South
Ziyang Zhongguo Yagu	Ziyang	South
Neijiang Zhonglongjiu	Neijiang	South
Mianyang Jiuzhou Changhong	Mianyang	North
Aba Zhou Guocheng	Aba	North
Guangyuan Jianmen Xiongguan	Guangyuan	North
Deyang Zhongzhuang	Deyang	North
Ganzi Zhou Youji Maoniu	Ganzi	North

== Seasons ==
Sichuan City Football League seasons
Season	Champions	Runners-up	Third place	Finals opener host
2025–26	TBD	TBD	TBD	Dazhou

== See also ==
- Jiangsu Football City League
- Chengdu Rongcheng F.C.
- Shandong Qilu Football Super League
