= Jiangsu Football City League =

Soccer league in Jiangsu Province, China

- Founded: 2025; 1 year ago
- Country: China
- Number of clubs: 13
- Current champions: Wuxi (1st title) (2026 Jiangsu Football City League)
- Most championships: Taizhou (1 title); Wuxi (1 title)
- Broadcasters: Jiangsu Broadcasting Corporation and local TV stations etc. CCTV-5 and CCTV-5+ (for knockout round only)
- Website: jscl.sutisport.com

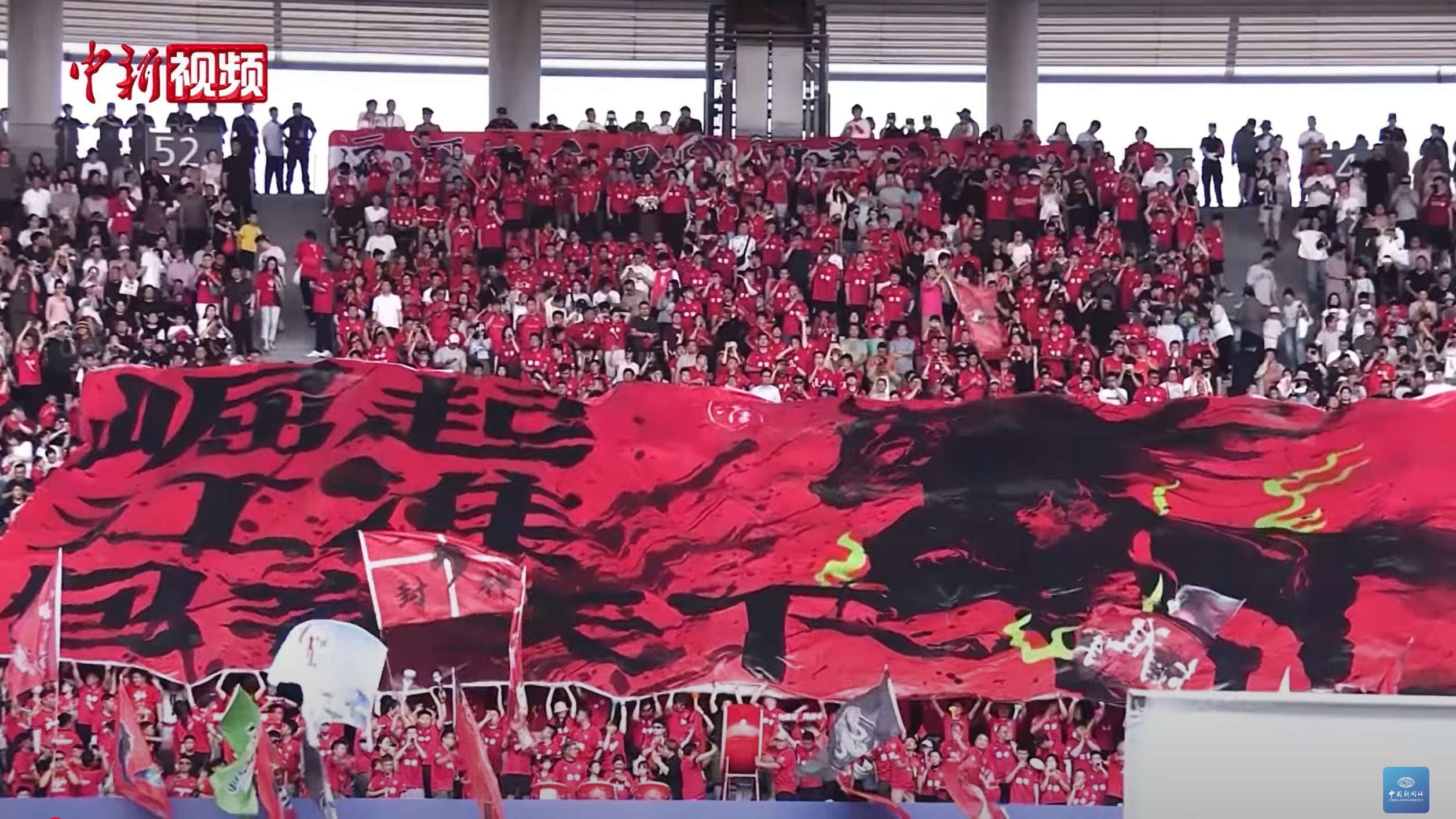
Fans of Huai'an during a match in June 2025.

The Jiangsu Football City League (JSCL; Chinese: 江苏省城市足球联赛), popularly referred to as Suchao (Chinese: 苏超) is a municipal soccer league established by Jiangsu Province in China in 2025. All 13 prefecture-level cities in Jiangsu Province establish teams named after their respective city (e.g., Nantong, Taizhou) to compete in the tournament, which consists of two phases: the regular season and the knockout stage, spanning a total of seven months and comprising 85 matches. The players of these representative teams are predominantly amateur competitors.

Jiangsu Province intends to leverage the Jiangsu Football City League to enhance domestic economic circulation while proactively fostering a consumption-driven economy. As the conventional catalysts of exports and investment wane, consumption has become a crucial factor for sustaining consistent growth. In this setting, Jiangsu is utilizing the catalytic influence of urban football leagues to foster enhanced synergy among culture, tourism, sports, and commerce. Analysts indicate that the focus on consumption-driven growth and event-based stimulation is a proactive measure addressing the necessity for economic transformation.

== History ==
Following the dissolution of Jiangsu Suning Football Club in 2021, the aspirations of local fans for premier local competitions have remained unaddressed. Besides, all 13 prefecture-level cities in Jiangsu (e.g. Nanjing, Wuxi, Xuzhou, Changzhou, Suzhou, Nantong, Lianyungang, Huai'an, Yancheng, Yangzhou, Zhenjiang, Taizhou, Suqian) rank within the top 100 cities in the nation for GDP, making it the sole region in the country characterized by longstanding economic rivalry and cultural diversity among its cities.

In December 2024, the Jiangsu Provincial Sports Bureau organized a match between Nanjing and Suzhou, two pivotal cities for soccer development in Jiangsu Province. The match attracted tens of thousands of fans to both home and away stadiums, and the positive reception prompted Jiangsu Province to propose a league involving 13 cities.

On March 3, 2025, the Jiangsu Provincial Sports Bureau convened a meeting to advance the initiatives of the 2025 Jiangsu Provincial City Football League. On March 28, the draw for the 2025 Jiangsu Provincial City Football League took place in Rugao, Nantong. The inaugural match took place at the Zhenjiang Sports and Exhibition Center on May 10, featuring Zhenjiang and Yangzhou.

To facilitate more attendance at matches and enhance the overall viewing experience, some cities undertook initiatives to modernize their home grounds. Subsequent to the 3rd round of the season, cities including Nanjing, Suzhou, Nantong, and Changzhou concurrently submitted requests to transition to larger, more sophisticated stadiums. Nanjing relocated its home matches from Wutaishan Stadium to Nanjing Olympic Sports Centre; Nantong relocated its location to the Haimen base of the Nantong Football Training Center; Changzhou changed its home venue from the Changzhou Institute of Technology Stadium to the Changzhou Olympic Sports Centre; Suzhou advanced by designating the Kunshan Olympic Sports Center, constructed to FIFA specifications and accommodating roughly 45,000 spectators, as its new home field.

With the beginning of the knockout round of the 2025 season, VAR technology was introduced into the league, allowing for future matches to be more entertaining and precise.

The final was played on 1 November 2025 between Taizhou and Nantong at the Nanjing Olympic Sports Centre. Taizhou won the match after defeating Nantong on penalties.

== Scoreboard ==
=== 2025 Season ===
==== Regular season Phase ====
Pos	Team	Pld	W	D	L	GF	GA	GD	Pts	Qualification
1	Nantong	12	10	2	0	29	6	+23	32	Knockout Round
2	Nanjing	12	7	3	2	25	11	+14	24	Knockout Round
3	Xuzhou	12	6	5	1	17	11	+6	23	Knockout Round
4	Yancheng	12	7	1	4	22	13	+9	22	Knockout Round
5	Wuxi	12	5	4	3	18	12	+6	19	Knockout Round
6	Taizhou	12	5	3	4	16	17	−1	18	Knockout Round
7	Lianyungang	12	5	3	4	15	17	−2	18	Knockout Round
8	Huai'an	12	4	4	4	14	10	+4	16	Knockout Round
9	Suqian	12	4	3	5	14	18	−4	15	
10	Suzhou	12	3	5	4	18	16	+2	14	
11	Yangzhou	12	2	1	9	8	23	−15	7	
12	Changzhou	12	1	2	9	5	24	−19	5	
13	Zhenjiang	12	1	0	11	6	29	−23	3	

Updated to match(es) played on September 27, 2025. Source: Administration of Sport of Jiangsu Province
Rules for classification: 1）Points；2）Points obtained in the matches played between the tied teams；3）Goal difference in the matches played between the tied teams；4）Number of goals scored in the matches played between the tied teams；5）Goal difference in all matches；6）Number of goals scored in all matches；7）Fair play points in all matches；8）Draw

Results
Home \ Away	NT	NJ	XZ	YC	WX	TZ	LYG	HA	SQ	SZ	YZ	CZ	ZJ
Nantong		—	—	2–1	—	—	5–0	1–1	4–0	2–1	—	2–0	—
Nanjing	1–2		1–1	3–2	1–0	—	—	—	4–0	0–0	—	—	—
Xuzhou	1–2	—		1–1	—	—	2–1	—	—	1–0	2–1	—	1–0
Yancheng	—	—	—		0–2	3–0	1–3	1–0	—	—	—	5–0	2–0
Wuxi	1–1	—	3–3	—		—	0–0	1–2	—	1–1	—	2–0	—
Taizhou	0–4	3–0	1–2	—	2–0		—	—	1–0	—	—	1–1	—
Lianyungang	—	0–3	—	—	—	2–3		2–0	—	1–1	1–0	—	1–0
Huai'an	—	1–1	0–0	—	—	3–1	—		—	3–0	—	0–0	4–0
Suqian	—	—	1–1	0–1	0–1	—	2–2	2–0		—	3–1	—	—
Suzhou	—	—	—	2–3	—	1–1	—	—	2–2		3–0	3–2	4–0
Yangzhou	0–1	1–5	—	0–2	0–2	1–1	—	1–0	—	—		—	—
Changzhou	—	0–4	0–2	—	—	—	0–2	—	1–2	—	0–1		1–0
Zhenjiang	0–3	1–2	—	—	2–5	0–2	—	—	0–2	—	3–2	—	

Updated to match(es) played on September 27, 2025. Source: Administration of Sport of Jiangsu Province
Legend: Blue = home team win; Yellow = draw; Red = away team win.

==== Knockout Round ====
Quarter-finals
Oct 4th – Nanjing
Nanjing (p)	1 (4)
Lianyungang	1 (2)
Oct 5th – Xuzhou
Xuzhou	1 (2)
Taizhou (p)	1 (4)
Oct 7th – Nantong
Nantong	5
Huai'an	0
Oct 8th – Yancheng
Yancheng	0
Wuxi	3

Semi-finals
Oct 18th – Nanjing
Nanjing	1 (7)
Taizhou (p)	1 (8)
Oct 19th – Nantong
Nantong (p)	0 (4)
Wuxi	0 (2)

Final
Nov 1st – Nanjing
Taizhou (p)	0 (4)
Nantong	0 (3)

=== 2026 Season ===
The 2026 season will be extended by one month compared to the 2025 season. The regular season will still adopt a single round-robin format, with a total of 78 matches. In the knockout stage, the quarterfinals and semifinals will be adjusted from single-leg to home-and-away two-legged ties, adding six matches compared to the previous year and bringing the total number of matches to 91.

==== Regular season Phase ====
Pos	Team	Pld	W	D	L	GF	GA	GD	Pts	Qualification
1	Wuxi	12	7	4	1	22	10	+12	25	Knockout Round
2	Suqian	12	6	2	4	17	13	+4	20	Knockout Round
3	Changzhou	12	6	2	4	17	13	+4	20	Knockout Round
4	Nantong	12	5	5	2	10	9	+1	20	Knockout Round
5	Taizhou	12	5	4	3	14	13	+1	19	Knockout Round
6	Suzhou	12	4	6	2	12	9	+3	18	Knockout Round
7	Yancheng	12	5	3	4	10	10	0	18	Knockout Round
8	Xuzhou	12	4	5	3	14	9	+5	17	Knockout Round
9	Nanjing	12	4	4	4	10	10	0	16	
10	Huai'an	12	4	2	6	14	16	−2	14	
11	Yangzhou	12	3	3	6	7	13	−6	12	
12	Zhenjiang	12	2	2	8	9	19	−10	8	
13	Lianyungang	12	0	4	8	3	15	−12	4	

Updated to match(es) played on September 19, 2026. Source: Administration of Sport of Jiangsu Province
Rules for classification: 1）Points；2）Points obtained in the matches played between the tied teams；3）Goal difference in the matches played between the tied teams；4）Number of goals scored in the matches played between the tied teams；5）Goal difference in all matches；6）Number of goals scored in all matches；7）Fair play points in all matches；8）Draw

Results
Home \ Away	WX	SQ	CZ	NT	TZ	SZ	YC	XZ	NJ	HA	YZ	ZJ	LYG
Wuxi		2–4	—	—	3–1	—	1–1	—	0–0	—	2–0	3–1	—
Suqian	—		0–3	1–2	0–1	2–2	—	—	2–0	—	—	3–0	—
Changzhou	1–5	—		3–0	0–0	0–0	2–1	—	—	1–2	—	—	—
Nantong	1–1	—	—		0–1	—	—	0–0	0–0	—	1–1	1–0	—
Taizhou	—	—	—	—		1–2	2–0	—	—	1–1	3–1	1–1	1–0
Suzhou	0–1	—	—	2–2	—		—	0–0	1–0	0–1	—	—	2–2
Yancheng	—	1–0	—	0–1	—	0–0		1–1	0–2	—	1–0	—	—
Xuzhou	0–1	1–2	2–0	—	3–0	—	—		1–0	2–3	—	—	—
Nanjing	—	—	2–1	—	2–2	—	—	—		2–1	0–1	2–1	0–0
Huai'an	1–3	1–2	—	0–1	—	—	0–1	—	—		1–1	—	2–0
Yangzhou	—	0–1	1–3	—	—	0–1	—	0–0	—	—		1–0	1–0
Zhenjiang	—	—	0–2	—	—	0–2	1–2	1–1	—	2–1	—		2–0
Lianyungang	0–0	0–0	0–1	0–1	—	—	0–2	1–3	—	—	—	—	

Updated to match(es) played on September 19, 2026. Source: Administration of Sport of Jiangsu Province
Legend: Blue = home team win; Yellow = draw; Red = away team win.

== Cultures ==
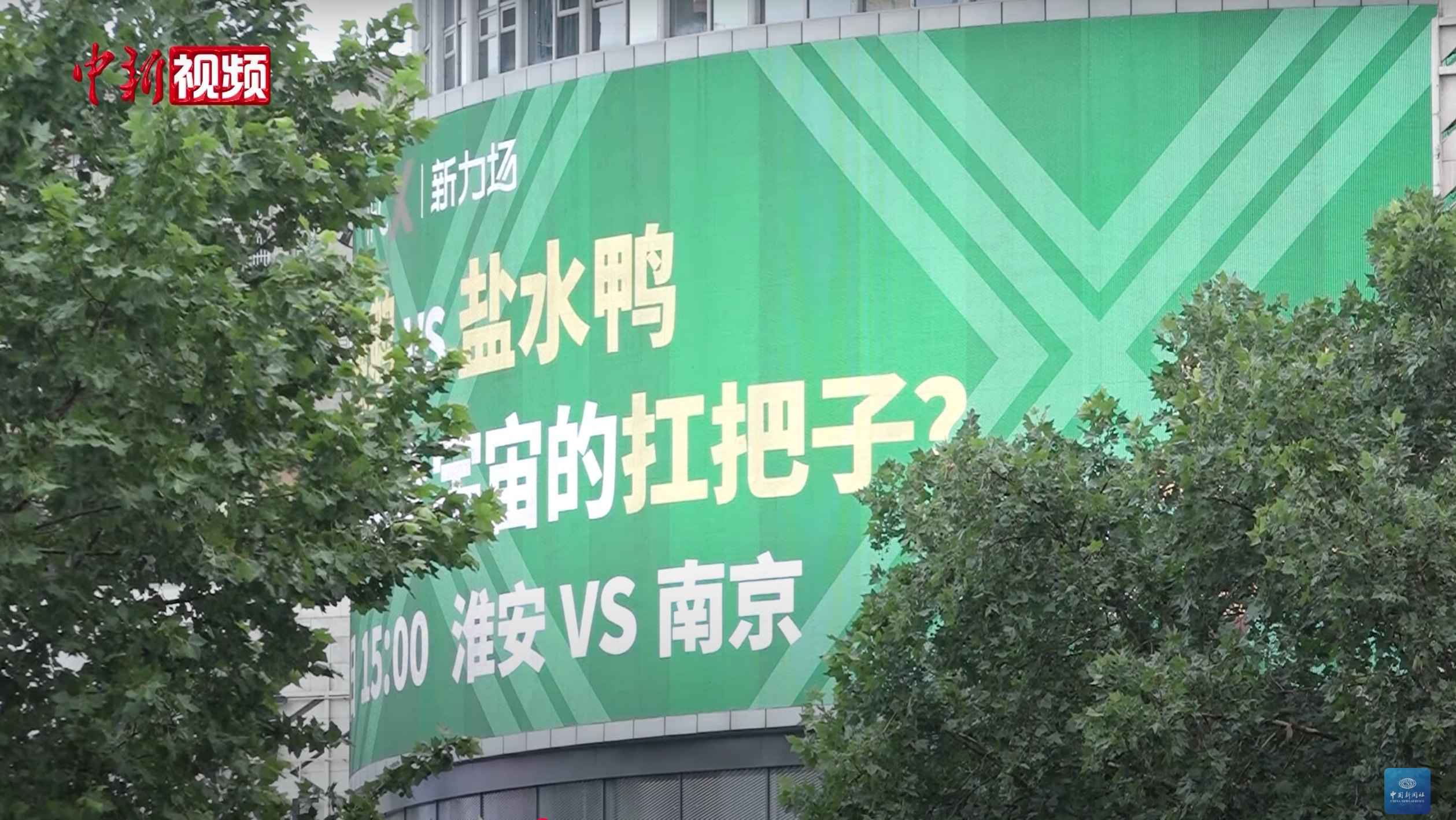
The promotional advertisement for the match between Huai'an and Nanjing teams in June 2025

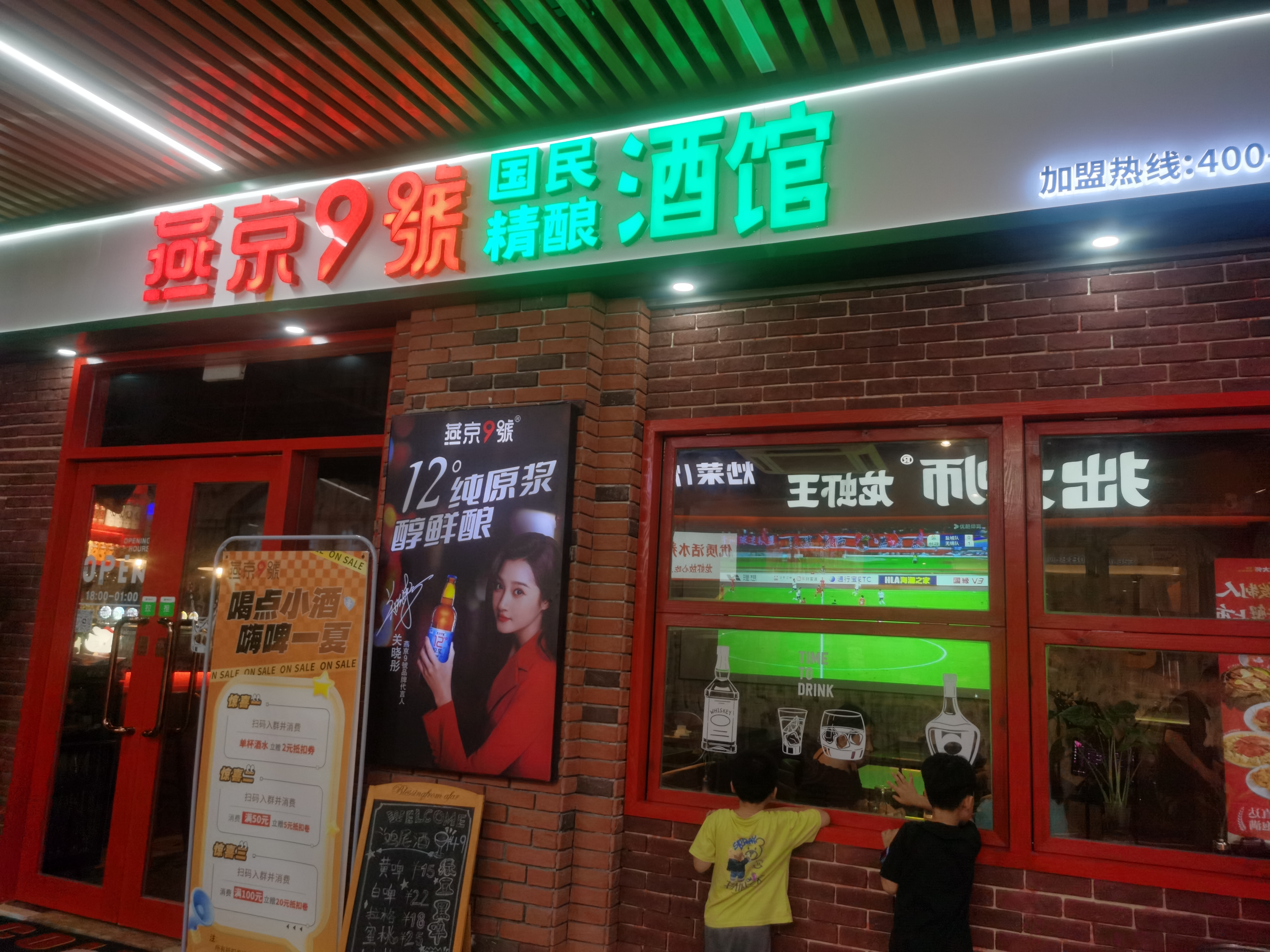
Audiences who watch the match between Yancheng and Wuxi near the bar in Suzhou in August 2025

The commencement of the season coincided with the International Workers' Day and Dragon Boat Festival, offering considerable spare time and markedly enhancing spectators' enthusiasm for attending matches. Favorable weather conditions in Jiangsu during this time encouraged greater in-person attendance from supporters. During the initial round, host towns expressed apprehension regarding insufficient attendance. Some even provided complimentary tickets through web promotions and engaged schools and corporations to populate the audience. Cities initiated tourist packages to entice visitors, exemplified by Changzhou's favored "9.9 RMB match ticket + Changzhou pickled radish + Yangzhou fried rice" combination. Nonetheless, the league's popularity far surpassed projections. Tickets initially priced at 10 RMB escalated to 600 RMB in the resale market, with some asserting they are "even more difficult to obtain than a Jay Chou concert ticket."

Jiangsu, being a prominent province, features five men's professional football clubs in the second division or higher, supported by a robust youth training system and comprehensive sports infrastructure. All 13 participating cities are notably ranked inside China's top 100 cities by GDP; 13 of the 27 cities classed as Tier 2 in Public Finance Status (Chinese: 二级财政城市) are situated in Jiangsu. Geographically compact, cities in Jiangsu are about one to two hours apart by high-speed rail, earning the moniker “weekend backyard.”

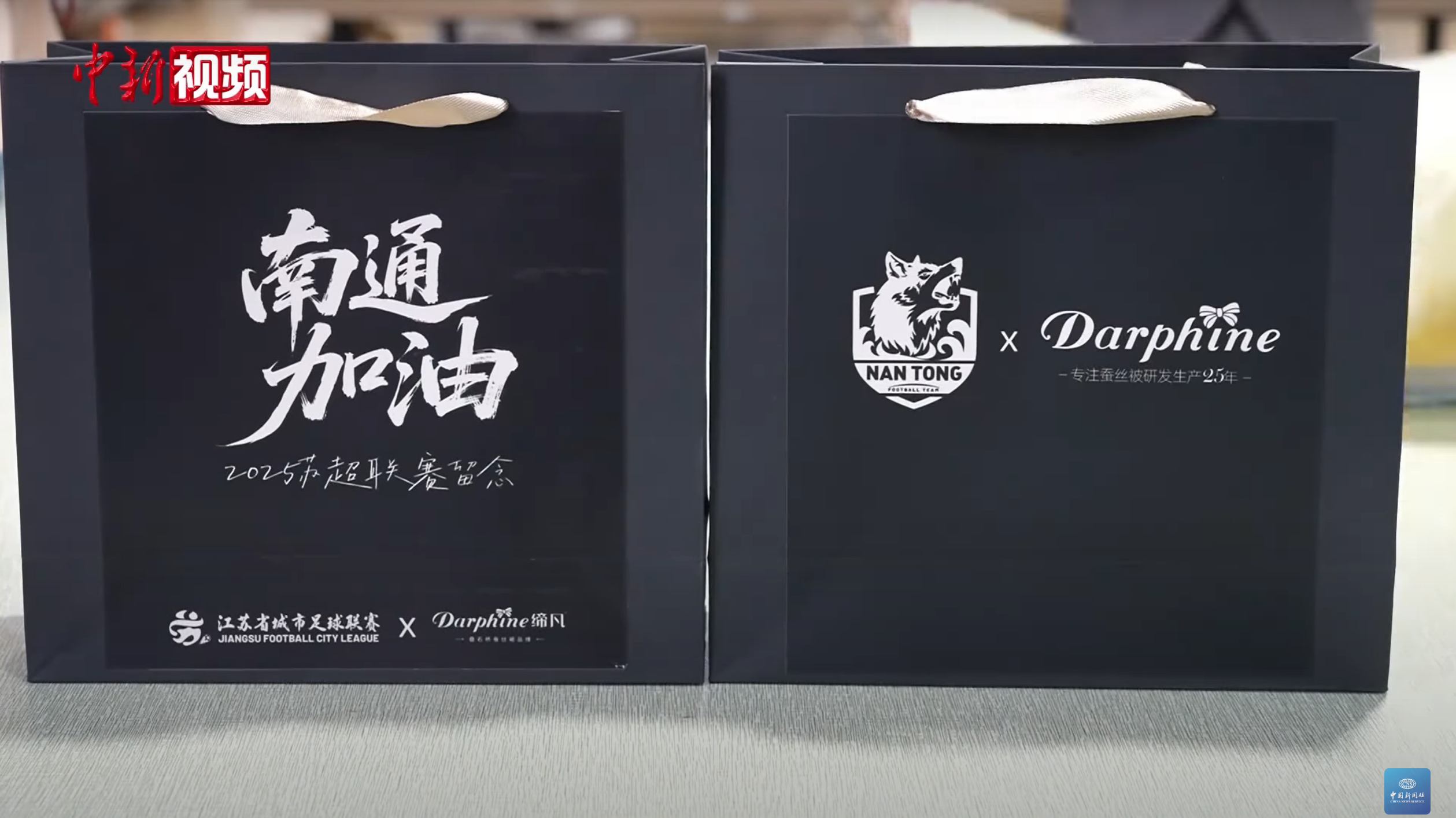
Cultural and creative products made by enterprises in Nantong

Jiangsu's is known for strong local identities and competition among its cities. The province is colloquially referenced as “Fragmented Jiangsu” (Chinese: 散装江苏) and the “Thirteen Champions” (Chinese: 十三太保). Their inner city rivalries has also been reflected in the league, particularly in matches involving the provincial capital Nanjing. The slogan “Victory First, Friendship Fourteenth” circulated online and was also used in municipal social media communications

By weaving together historical ties, culinary culture, and distinctive city personalities, the event created a narrative rich in viral appeal and sparked a vibrant “meme economy.” For example, the "Chu–Han Contention" was reenacted on the pitch between Xuzhou (the hometown of Liu Bang) and Suqian (the hometown of Xiang Yu), where ancient grudges found new expression through football. The “Battle of the Bro Nan” saw fans from Nanjing and Nantong fiercely debate over who the real “Bro Nan” is. Meanwhile, the face-off between Nanjing and Wuxi was dubbed a “food war” by netizens—Salted Duck vs. Honey Peach.

Tourism agencies from many cities promptly emulated this action. During the Dragon Boat Festival, Changzhou declared complimentary access to all A-rated tourist attractions for visitors from Yangzhou, resulting in the viral phrase: “10,000 Yangzhou residents in China Dinosaurs Park.” Football rapidly emerged as a catalyst for urban consumption. In some instances, tourism discounts were also granted to all visitors from rival teams' locations, thereby fully merging sports with cultural and economic interchange. Cities, such as Zhenjiang, Yancheng, and Huai'an, initiated ticket stub programs that integrate match attendance with travel and culinary incentives.

== See also ==
- Chinese Football Association Member Association Champions League
- Hunan Football League
- Chinese Super League
- Shandong Qilu Football Super League
- Sichuan City Football League
